= 2018 South Carolina Gamecocks football team =

American college football season

2018 South Carolina Gamecocks football

Belk Bowl, L 0–28 vs. Virginia
- Conference: Southeastern Conference
- Eastern Division
- Record: 7–6 (4–4 SEC)
- Head coach: Will Muschamp (3rd season)
- Offensive coordinator: Bryan McClendon (3rd season)
- Offensive scheme: Hurry-up, no-huddle spread
- Defensive coordinator: Travaris Robinson (3rd season)
- Base defense: Multiple 4–3
- Home stadium: Williams–Brice Stadium

Uniform
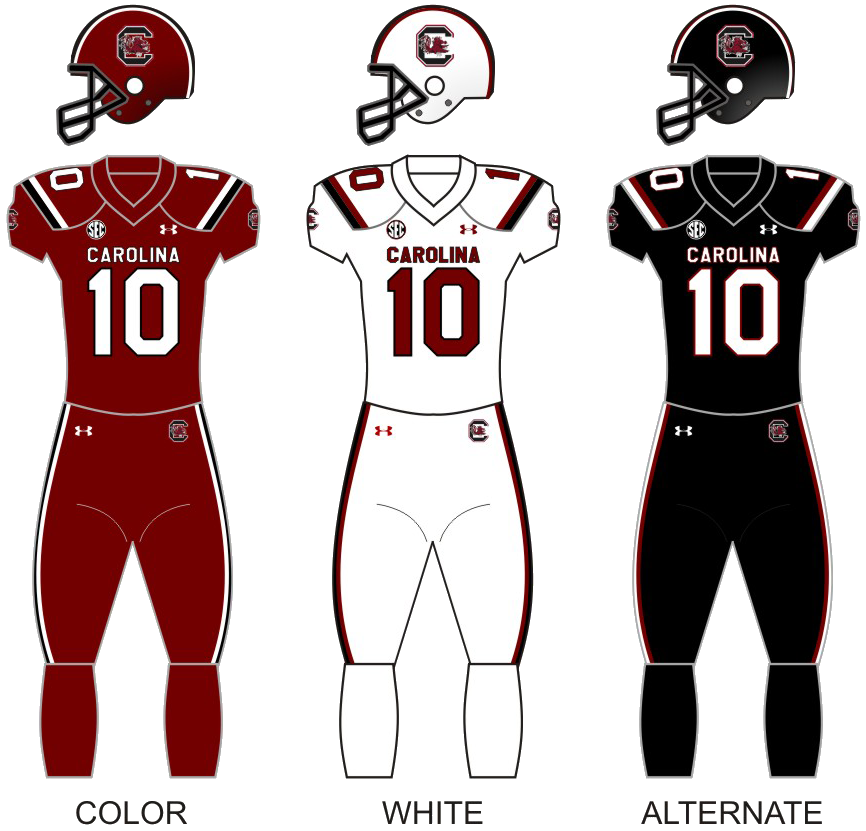

2018 Southeastern Conference football standings
	Conf.			Overall
Team	W		L	W		L
Eastern Division
No. T–7 Georgia x	7	–	1	11	–	3
No. 12 Kentucky	5	–	3	10	–	3
No. T–7 Florida	5	–	3	10	–	3
South Carolina	4	–	4	7	–	6
Missouri	4	–	4	8	–	5
Vanderbilt	3	–	5	6	–	7
Tennessee	2	–	6	5	–	7
Western Division
No. 2 Alabama x$^	8	–	0	14	–	1
No. 16 Texas A&M	5	–	3	9	–	4
No. 6 LSU	5	–	3	10	–	3
Mississippi State*	4	–	4	8	–	5
Auburn	3	–	5	8	–	5
Ole Miss	1	–	7	5	–	7
Arkansas	0	–	8	2	–	10
Championship: Alabama 35, Georgia 28
^ – College Football Playoff participant; $ – Conference champion; x – Division champion/co-champions; * Mississippi State vacated four conference and eight total wins due to NCAA violations.; Rankings from AP Poll

The 2018 South Carolina Gamecocks football team (variously USC, SC, South Carolina, or The Gamecocks) represented the University of South Carolina in the 2018 NCAA Division I FBS football season. This season marked the Gamecocks 125th overall season, 27th as a member of the SEC, and 3rd under head coach Will Muschamp. The Gamecocks played their home games at Williams–Brice Stadium in Columbia, South Carolina and compiled an overall record of 7–6, and 4–4 in SEC play.

South Carolina entered the season with high expectations after overachieving the previous year. The Gamecocks won their season-opener, and entered the AP Top 25 for the first time since 2014. (Note: South Carolina had been ranked in the CFP rankings at the end of the 2017 season, but had not been ranked in the AP Poll since September 2014.) Through the regular season, they defeated every unranked opponent and lost to every ranked opponent. By the end of the regular season, Muschamp had become the first coach in school history to win 22 games and reach three bowl games in his first three seasons. However, the season ended with a "disaster" in the Belk Bowl, and this would be Muschamp's final winning season; it would also be South Carolina's final winning season until 2021.

Gamecock fan Marcus Washington's trap remix of "Sandstorm" also made its debut at Williams–Brice Stadium, and has since become a "staple" at home football games.

== Background ==
=== Offseason departures ===
Name	Number	Pos.	Height	Weight	Year	Hometown	Note
Hayden Hurst	#81	TE	6'5	253	Junior	Jacksonville, FL	Declared for NFL Draft
Skai Moore	#10	LB	6'2	221	RS Senior	Cooper City, FL	Graduated
Jamarcus King	#7	CB	6'1	186	Senior	Eight Mile, AL	Graduated
Dante Sawyer	#95	DE	6'3	265	Senior	Suwanee, GA	Graduated
Chris Lammons	#3	S	5'9	188	Senior	Sunrise, FL	Graduated
Alan Knott	#70	C	6'4	274	RS Senior	Tyrone, GA	Graduated
Taylor Stallworth	#90	DT	6'3	308	Senior	Mobile, AL	Graduated
Ulric Jones	#93	DT	6'6	309	RS Senior	Oxford, AL	Graduated
D.J. Smith	#24	S	5'9	188	Senior	Marietta, GA	Graduated
Corey Helms	#51	OG	6'5	308	RS Senior	Alpharetta, GA	Graduated
D.J. Park	#69	RT	6'5	332	RS Senior	Dillon, SC	Graduated
Kaleb Chalmers	#12	CB	5'10	181	RS Sophomore	Greenwood, SC	Transferred
C.J. Freeman	#36	RB	5'11	204	RS Sophomore	Greensboro, NC	Transferred
Jerad Washington	#9	WR	5'8	171	RS Sophomore	Jacksonville, FL	Transferred
Antoine Wilder	#29	LB	5'10	198	RS Junior	Riverdale, GA	Transferred
Aaron Thompson	#96	DT	6'3	300	RS Sophomore	Fort Lauderdale, FL	Transferred
Terry Googer	#6	WR	6'4	217	RS Junior	Atlanta, GA	Retired
Davonne Bowen	#54	LB	6'1	218	RS Freshman	Simpsonville, SC	Retired

== Preseason ==
=== Returning starters ===
South Carolina will have sixteen returning players on offense, nine on defense and two on special teams that started games in 2017.

==== Offense ====
Player	Class	Position
Jake Bentley	Junior	Quarterback
Deebo Samuel	RS Senior	Wide receiver
Bryan Edwards	Junior	Wide receiver
Zack Bailey	Senior	Offensive tackle
Rico Dowdle	Junior	Running back
Shi Smith	Sophomore	Wide receiver
OrTre Smith	Sophomore	Wide receiver
A.J. Turner	RS Junior	Running back
Ty'Son Williams	RS Junior	Running back
Jacob August	RS Senior	Tight end
Kevin Crosby	RS Senior	Tight end
Malik Young	RS Senior	Offensive tackle
Donell Stanley	RS Senior	Center
Blake Camper	Senior	Offensive tackle
Sadarius Hutcherson	Sophomore	Offensive guard
Randrecous Davis	Sophomore	Wide receiver

==== Defense ====
Player	Class	Position
Bryson Allen-Williams	RS Senior	Linebacker
D. J. Wonnum	Junior	Defensive end
T. J. Brunson	Junior	Linebacker
Rashad Fenton	Senior	Cornerback
Javon Kinlaw	Junior	Defensive tackle
Jamyest Williams	Sophomore	Safety
Sherrod Greene	Junior	Linebacker
Keir Thomas	Junior	Defensive end
Steven Montac	Senior	Defensive back

==== Special teams ====
Player	Class	Position
Parker White	RS Sophomore	Kicker
Joseph Charlton	RS Junior	Punter

=== Award watch lists ===
Listed in the order that they were released

Award	Player	Position	Year
Rimington Trophy	Donell Stanley	C	JR
Chuck Bednarik Award	D. J. Wonnum	DE	JR
Maxwell Award	Jake Bentley	QB	JR
Maxwell Award	Deebo Samuel	WR	SR
Davey O'Brien Award	Jake Bentley	QB	JR
Doak Walker Award	Rico Dowdle	RB	JR
Fred Biletnikoff Award	Deebo Samuel	WR	SR
John Mackey Award	K.C. Crosby	TE	SR
Paul Hornung Award	Deebo Samuel	WR	SR
Wuerffel Trophy	T. J. Brunson	LB	JR
Walter Camp Award	Jake Bentley	QB	JR
Ted Hendricks Award	D. J. Wonnum	DE	JR
Johnny Unitas Golden Arm Award	Jake Bentley	QB	JR
Manning Award	Jake Bentley	QB	JR

=== SEC media poll ===
The SEC media poll was released on July 20, 2018, with the Gamecocks predicted to finish in second place in the East Division.

=== Preseason All-SEC teams ===
The Gamecocks had three players at five positions selected to the preseason all-SEC teams.

Offense

1st team

Deebo Samuel – WR

3rd team

Zack Bailey – OL

Specialists

1st team

Deebo Samuel – RET

Deebo Samuel – all purpose player

2nd team

Joseph Charlton – P

=== Recruiting ===
==== 2018 recruiting class ====
College recruiting (2018)
Name	Hometown	School	Height	Weight	Commit date
Rick Sandidge; DT	Concord, NC	Concord	6 ft 5 in (1.96 m)	290 lb (130 kg)	Feb 7, 2018
Rick Sandidge; DT	Recruit ratings: Scout: Rivals: 247Sports: ESPN: (80)				
Josh Vann; WR	Tucker, GA	Tucker	5 ft 11 in (1.80 m)	177 lb (80 kg)	Aug 19, 2017
Josh Vann; WR	Recruit ratings: Scout: Rivals: 247Sports: ESPN: (82)				
Dylan Wonnum; OT	Tucker, GA	Tucker	6 ft 5 in (1.96 m)	291 lb (132 kg)	Feb 3, 2018
Dylan Wonnum; OT	Recruit ratings: Scout: Rivals: 247Sports: ESPN: (84)				
Dakereon Joyner; QB	North Charleston, SC	Fort Dorchester	6 ft 1 in (1.85 m)	202 lb (92 kg)	Jun 18, 2017
Dakereon Joyner; QB	Recruit ratings: Scout: Rivals: 247Sports: ESPN: (82)				
Jaycee Horn; CB	Alpharetta, GA	Alpharetta	6 ft 0 in (1.83 m)	180 lb (82 kg)	Dec 18, 2017
Jaycee Horn; CB	Recruit ratings: Scout: Rivals: 247Sports: ESPN: (83)				
Kingsley Enagbare; DE	Atlanta, GA	Hapeville Charter	6 ft 5 in (1.96 m)	257 lb (117 kg)	Jul 26, 2017
Kingsley Enagbare; DE	Recruit ratings: Scout: Rivals: 247Sports: ESPN: (80)				
Jovaughn Gwyn; OG	Charlotte, NC	Harding	6 ft 2 in (1.88 m)	294 lb (133 kg)	Dec 20, 2017
Jovaughn Gwyn; OG	Recruit ratings: Scout: Rivals: 247Sports: ESPN: (79)				
Rosendo Louis; ILB	Deerfield Beach, FL	Deerfield Beach	6 ft 2 in (1.88 m)	237 lb (108 kg)	Dec 20, 2017
Rosendo Louis; ILB	Recruit ratings: Scout: Rivals: 247Sports: ESPN: (81)				
Jonathan Gipson; CB	Hoschton, GA	Mill Creek	6 ft 1 in (1.85 m)	183 lb (83 kg)	Jul 31, 2017
Jonathan Gipson; CB	Recruit ratings: Scout: Rivals: 247Sports: ESPN: (81)				
Maxwell Iyama; OT	Murfreesboro, TN	Siegel	6 ft 6 in (1.98 m)	300 lb (140 kg)	Apr 2, 2017
Maxwell Iyama; OT	Recruit ratings: Scout: Rivals: 247Sports: ESPN: (77)				
Deshaun Fenwick; RB	Bradenton, FL	Braden River	6 ft 2 in (1.88 m)	208 lb (94 kg)	May 3, 2017
Deshaun Fenwick; RB	Recruit ratings: Scout: Rivals: 247Sports: ESPN: (79)				
Hank Manos; C	Chapin, SC	Chapin	6 ft 5 in (1.96 m)	270 lb (120 kg)	Mar 28, 2017
Hank Manos; C	Recruit ratings: Scout: Rivals: 247Sports: ESPN: (79)				
Lavonte Valentine; RB	Melbourne, FL	Melbourne Central Catholic	6 ft 1 in (1.85 m)	190 lb (86 kg)	Jul 4, 2017
Lavonte Valentine; RB	Recruit ratings: Scout: Rivals: 247Sports: ESPN: (77)				
Tyquan Johnson; WR	Sylvania, GA	Screven County	6 ft 4 in (1.93 m)	192 lb (87 kg)	Jul 22, 2017
Tyquan Johnson; WR	Recruit ratings: Scout: Rivals: 247Sports: ESPN: (78)				
Jabari Ellis; DT	Santee, SC	Georgia Military College	6 ft 3 in (1.91 m)	285 lb (129 kg)	Jul 4, 2017
Jabari Ellis; DT	Recruit ratings: Scout: Rivals: 247Sports: ESPN: (79)				
Israel Mukuamu; CB	Bossier City, LA	Parkway	6 ft 5 in (1.96 m)	187 lb (85 kg)	Dec 9, 2017
Israel Mukuamu; CB	Recruit ratings: Scout: Rivals: 247Sports: ESPN: (77)				
Jesus Gibbs; OG	Dumfries, VA	Potomic	6 ft 4 in (1.93 m)	270 lb (120 kg)	Jul 22, 2017
Jesus Gibbs; OG	Recruit ratings: Scout: Rivals: 247Sports: ESPN: (79)				
Ernest Jones; OLB	Waycross, GA	Ware County	6 ft 2 in (1.88 m)	215 lb (98 kg)	May 5, 2017
Ernest Jones; OLB	Recruit ratings: Scout: Rivals: 247Sports: ESPN: (76)				
Wyatt Campbell; OT	Lugoff, SC	Lugoff-Elgin	6 ft 7 in (2.01 m)	290 lb (130 kg)	Jun 15, 2017
Wyatt Campbell; OT	Recruit ratings: Scout: Rivals: 247Sports: ESPN: (77)				
Darius Rush; WR	Greeleyville, SC	C.E. Murray	6 ft 2 in (1.88 m)	173 lb (78 kg)	Feb 27, 2017
Darius Rush; WR	Recruit ratings: Scout: Rivals: 247Sports: ESPN: (77)				
R.J. Roderick; S	Summerville, SC	Cane Bay	5 ft 11 in (1.80 m)	205 lb (93 kg)	Jun 3, 2017
R.J. Roderick; S	Recruit ratings: Scout: Rivals: 247Sports: ESPN: (75)				
Overall recruit ranking: Scout: 19 Rivals: 19 247Sports: 19 ESPN: 18
Note: In many cases, Scout, Rivals, 247Sports, On3, and ESPN may conflict in their listings of height and weight.; In these cases, the average was taken. ESPN grades are on a 100-point scale.; Sources: "2018 South Carolina Football Commitment List". Rivals.; "2018 South Carolina Commits". Scout.; "2018 commits". ESPN.; "Scout.com Team Recruiting Rankings". Scout.; "2018 Team Ranking". Rivals.com.; "2018 South Carolina Gamecocks football team". 247Sports.

==== Incoming transfers ====
South Carolina added two grad transfers, and two regular transfers to the 2018 roster.

Name	Pos.	Height	Weight	Year	Hometown	Prev. School
Nick Harvey	CB	5'10"	185	Senior (Grad Transfer)	Richmond, TX	Texas A&M
J.T. Ibe	S	6'0"	190	Senior (Grad Transfer)	Mansfield, TX	Rice
Jamel Cook	S	6'4"	186	RS Sophomore	Miami, FL	Southern Cal
Josh Belk	DT	6'3"	359	Freshman	Richburg, SC	Clemson

== Schedule ==
=== Spring game ===
2018 Garnet and Black Spring game

Team	1	2	3	4	Total
• Black	14	10	10	0	34
Garnet	3	17	0	0	20

- Location: Columbia, South Carolina
- Game start: 12:00 p.m.
- Elapsed time: 2:10
- Game attendance: 25,500
- TV announcers (SECN): Clay Matvick (play-by-play), Gene Chizik (analyst), Matt Stinchcomb (analyst), Laura Rutledge (sidelines)

Scoring summary
Q1	10:14	BLACK	Ty'Son Williams 27 yard run (Parker White kick)	7–0 BLACK
Q1	5:15	GARNET	Parker White 47-yard field goal	7–3 BLACK
Q1	1:54	BLACK	Jacob August 8-yard pass from Jake Bentley (Parker White kick)	14–3 BLACK
Q2	9:20	GARNET	Deshaun Fenwick 1-yard run (Parker White kick)	14–10 BLACK
Q2	6:30	BLACK	Bryan Edwards 19-yard pass from Jake Bentley (Parker White kick)	21–10 BLACK
Q2	5:28	BLACK	Parker White 46-yard field goal	24–10 BLACK
Q2	4:47	GARNET	Alexander Woznick 40-yard field goal	24–13 BLACK
Q2	1:18	GARNET	A.J. Turner 49-yard pass from Scarnecchia (Alexander Woznick kick)	24–20 BLACK
Q3	10:12	BLACK	Alexander Woznick 37-yard field goal	27–20 BLACK
Q3	3:56	BLACK	Deshaun Fenwick 1-yard run (Alexander Woznick kick)	34–20 BLACK

The 2018 South Carolina Gamecocks Garnet and Black spring game took place in Columbia, South Carolina on March 31, at 12:00 p.m. EST. The game was broadcast live on the SEC Network. The Black team defeated the Garnet team by a score of 34–20, QB Jake Bentley completed 15 of 25 passes for 174 yards and 2 TD's.

=== Regular season ===
South Carolina announced its 2018 football schedule on September 19, 2017. The schedule consists of 7 home games and 5 away games for the regular season. The Gamecocks hosted SEC opponents Georgia (rivalry) on September 8, Missouri on October 6, Texas A&M on October 13, and Tennessee, on October 27. South Carolina traveled to four SEC opponents: Vanderbilt, Kentucky, Ole Miss and Florida.

South Carolina's out of conference opponents represent the ACC, MAC, SoCon and Sun Belt conferences. The Gamecocks hosted three non–conference games which are against Coastal Carolina of the Sun Belt, Akron of the MAC and Chattanooga of the SoCon. South Carolina traveled to archrival Clemson of the ACC for 116th annual Palmetto Bowl to finish the regular season. The Gamecocks were originally scheduled to face Conference USA opponent Marshall on September 15, but this game was cancelled due to Hurricane Florence. Akron was then scheduled as a replacement.

Date	Time	Opponent	Rank	Site	TV	Result	Attendance
September 1	12:00 p.m.	Coastal Carolina*		Williams–Brice Stadium; Columbia, SC	SECN	W 49–15	75,126
September 8	3:30 p.m.	No. 3 Georgia	No. 24	Williams–Brice Stadium; Columbia, SC (rivalry / SEC Nation)	CBS	L 17–41	83,140
September 22	4:00 p.m.	at Vanderbilt		Vanderbilt Stadium; Nashville, TN	SECN	W 37–14	26,078
September 29	7:30 p.m.	at No. 17 Kentucky		Kroger Field; Lexington, KY	SECN	L 10–24	63,081
October 6	12:00 p.m.	Missouri		Williams–Brice Stadium; Columbia, SC	SECN	W 37–35	73,393
October 13	3:30 p.m.	No. 22 Texas A&M		Williams–Brice Stadium; Columbia, SC	SECN	L 23–26	76,871
October 27	7:30 p.m.	Tennessee		Williams–Brice Stadium; Columbia, SC (rivalry)	SECN	W 27–24	80,614
November 3	12:00 p.m.	at Ole Miss		Vaught–Hemingway Stadium; Oxford, MS	SECN	W 48–44	56,798
November 10	12:00 p.m.	at No. 19 Florida		Ben Hill Griffin Stadium; Gainesville, FL	ESPN	L 31–35	82,696
November 17	7:30 p.m.	Chattanooga*		Williams–Brice Stadium; Columbia, SC	SECN	W 49–9	72,832
November 24	7:00 p.m.	at No. 2 Clemson*		Memorial Stadium; Clemson, SC (Palmetto Bowl)	ESPN	L 35–56	81,436
December 1^{[a]}	12:00 p.m.	Akron*		Williams–Brice Stadium; Columbia, SC	SECN	W 28–3	53,420
December 29	12:00 p.m.	vs. Virginia*		Bank of America Stadium; Charlotte, NC (Belk Bowl)	ABC	L 0–28	48,263
*Non-conference game; Rankings from AP Poll released prior to the game; All times are in Eastern time

== Personnel ==
=== Coaching staff ===
South Carolina head coach Will Muschamp entered his third-year in 2018. Muschamp led the Gamecocks to 15 wins and 11 losses over his first two years, tying Steve Spurrier, and Joe Morrison for most wins in the first two seasons as a Gamecock head coach. On December 6, Offensive Coordinator Kurt Roper was terminated after offensive struggles. Co-offensive coordinator/wide receivers coach Bryan McClendon served as the offensive coordinator for the Outback Bowl win against Michigan, and was promoted to permanent offensive coordinator to replace Roper. On January 5, Dan Werner accepted the role of quarterbacks coach. Werner has previously been on Ole Miss, Miami, and Alabama's coaching staff.

On January 11, it was announced that former South Carolina star running back Marcus Lattimore would be joining the staff as the director of player development.

Name	Position	Consecutive season
Will Muschamp	Head coach	3rd
Lance Thompson	Assistant head coach and defensive line coach	3rd
Travaris Robinson	Defensive coordinator and defensive backs coach	3rd
Bryan McClendon	Offensive coordinator and wide receivers coach	3rd (1st as OC)
Bobby Bentley	Running backs coach	3rd
Eric Wolford	Offensive line coach	2nd
Coleman Hutzler	Linebackers coach and special teams coordinator	3rd
Mike Peterson	Outside linebackers coach	3rd
Pat Washington	Tight ends coach	3rd
Dan Werner	Quarterbacks coach	1st
Kyle Krantz	Nickelbacks and strong side linebackers coach, assistant special teams coach	1st
Jeff Dillman	Director of Player Strength and Conditioning	3rd
Matthew Lindsey	Director of Player Personnel	2nd
Marcus Lattimore	Director of Player Development	1st

=== Roster ===
2018 South Carolina Gamecocks Football Roster
Quarterback: 4 Darius Douglas – (redshirt) freshman (6'0, 199); 7 Dakereon Joyner – freshman (6'1, 208); 10 Jay Urich – (redshirt) freshman (6'5, 210); 11 Corbett Glick – freshman (6'1, 203); 12 Michael Scarnecchia – (redshirt) senior(6'3, 216); 16 Bailey Hart – (redshirt) sophomore (6'3, 178); 17 Danny Gordon – (redshirt) senior (6'0, 211); 19 Jake Bentley – junior (6'4, 224); Running back: 5 Rico Dowdle – junior (6'0, 215); 14 Deshaun Fenwick – freshman (6'1, 220); 25 A.J. Turner – (redshirt) junior (5'10, 195); 27 Ty'Son Williams – (redshirt) junior (6'0, 219); 31 Lavonte Valentine – freshman (6'0, 190); 32 Caleb Kinlaw – senior (5'10, 198); 33 Slade Carroll – (redshirt) freshman (5'9, 210); 34 Mon Denson – (redshirt) junior (5'10, 212); Wide receiver: 1 Deebo Samuel – (redshirt) senior (6'0, 210); 6 Josh Vann – freshman (5'10, 185); 8 Randrecous Davis – (redshirt) sophomore (5'10, 189); 13 Shi Smith – sophomore (5'10, 187); 18 OrTre Smith – sophomore (6'4, 222); 28 Joe Thomas – freshman (5'9, 183); 80 Shemar Glenn – (redshirt) junior (6'0, 165); 81 Darius Rush – freshman (6'2, 184); 82 Bailey Rogers – junior (5'9, 167); 83 Chavis Dawkins – junior (6'2, 220); 86 Chad Terrell – sophomore (6'3, 219); 89 Bryan Edwards – junior (6'3, 220); Placekicker: 12 Shane Hynes – senior (5'9, 178); 42 Alexander Woznick – (redshirt) sophomore (5'11, 166); 43 Parker White – (redshirt) sophomore (6'5, 200); Punter: 20 Joseph Charlton – (redshirt) junior (6'5, 188); 85 Michael Almond – (redshirt) junior (6'3, 225)	Tight end: 3 K.C. Crosby – (redshirt) senior (6'1, 229); 15 Evan Hinson – (redshirt) junior (6'4, 230); 40 Jacob August – (redshirt) senior (6'6, 252); 41 Caleb Jenerette – (redshirt) freshman (6'2, 221); 46 Patrick Reedy – freshman (6'7, 240); 84 Kyle Markway – (redshirt) junior (6'4, 242); 87 Kiel Pollard – junior (6'1, 235); 88 Will Register – (redshirt) freshman (6'4, 251); Offensive Lineman: 50 Sadarius Hutcherson – (redshirt) sophomore (6'4, 310); 51 Maxwell Iyama – freshman (6'5, 310); 54 Jovaughn Gwyn – freshman (6'2, 296); 55 Christian Pellage – (redshirt) junior (6'7, 305); 60 Chandler Farrell – (redshirt) sophomore (6'3, 290); 61 Cameron Johnson – (redshirt) sophomore (6'6, 289); 63 Blake Camper – senior (6'8, 309); 66 Will Putnam – (redshirt) sophomore (6'5, 297); 68 Wyatt Campbell – freshman (6'6, 305); 70 Hank Manos – freshman (6'4, 289); 71 Eric Douglas – (redshirt) freshman (6'4, 298); 72 Donell Stanley – (redshirt) senior (6'3, 315); 73 Summie Carlay – (redshirt) freshman (6'5, 300); 74 Dennis Daley – senior (6'6, 324); 75 Jordon Carty – (redshirt) freshman (6'7, 315); 76 Jordan Rhodes – (redshirt) freshman (6'4, 325); 77 Malik Young – (redshirt) senior (6'3, 287); 78 Zack Bailey – senior (6'6, 314); 79 Dylan Wonnum – freshman (6'5, 310); Defensive Lineman: 3 Javon Kinlaw – junior (6'6, 305); 5 Keir Thomas – junior (6'2, 276); 8 D. J. Wonnum – junior (6'5, 258); 15 Aaron Sterling – sophomore (6'1, 245); 19 Brad Johnson – sophomore (6'2, 250); 35 Daniel Fennell – (redshirt) junior (6'2, 246); 50 Griffin Gentry – (redshirt) sophomore (6'1, 270); 52 Kingsley Enagbare – freshman (6'4, 285); 57 Jazuun Outlaw – (redshirt) freshman (6'2, 238); 61 Javion Duncan – (redshirt) senior (5'11, 273); 90 Rick Sandidge – freshman (6'5, 285); 91 Shameik Blackshear – (redshirt) junior (6'5, 270); 92 Tyreek Johnson – freshman (6'3, 270); 93 Jesus Gibbs – freshman (6'3, 280); 94 M.J. Webb – (redshirt) freshman (6'3, 288); 95 Kobe Smith – junior (6'2, 295); 96 Josh Belk – freshman (6'3, 359); 99 Jabari Ellis – junior (6'3, 280)	Linebacker: 4 Bryson Allen-Williams – (redshirt) senior (6'1, 230); 6 T. J. Brunson – junior (6'1, 240); 11 Eldridge Thompson – senior (6'1, 229); 30 Damani Staley – sophomore (6'0, 225); 42 Rosendo Louis Jr. – freshman (6'2, 240); 44 Sherrod Greene – sophomore (6'1, 228); 45 Spencer Eason-Riddle – (redshirt) sophomore (6'0, 225); 46 Noah Vincent – freshman (6'0, 209); 48 Sean McGonigal – (redshirt) freshman (6'1, 221); 53 Ernest Jones – freshman (6'2, 235); 59 Alex DeLoach – (redshirt) freshman (6'3, 209); Defensive back: 1 Nick Harvey – (redshirt) senior (5'10, 195); 7 Jaycee Horn – freshman (6'1, 195); 9 Keisean Nixon – senior (5'10, 193); 10 R.J. Roderick – freshman (6'0, 207); 16 Rashad Fenton – senior (5'11, 188); 17 Javon Charleston – (redshirt) junior (6'1, 187); 21 Jamyest Williams – sophomore (5'8, 182); 22 Steven Montac – senior (5'10, 186); 23 Korey Banks – (redshirt) sophomore (5'11, 191); 24 Israel Mukuamu – freshman (6'4, 200); 26 Jaylin Dickerson – (redshirt) freshman (6'1, 191); 28 Tayvn Jackson – (redshirt) freshman (5'9, 185); 29 J.T. Ibe – (redshirt) senior (5'10, 191); 31 Jamel Cook – (redshirt) sophomore (6'4, 186); 32 Kevin Pickens – (redshirt) junior (5'8, 177); 33 Zay Brown – (redshirt) freshman (5'11, 200); 36 Jonathan Gipson – freshman (6'1, 186); 39 Dawson Hoffman – freshman (5'11, 197); 40 Jason Senn – (redshirt) junior (5'8, 186); 47 Jaylan Foster – (redshirt) sophomore (5'10, 184); Long snappers: 45 Ben Asbury – (redshirt) senior (6'0, 199); 49 Matthew Smith – (redshirt) freshman (6'0, 209)
: 2018 South Carolina Gamecocks Football Roster 08/15/18

=== Depth chart ===
Defense

FS
Steven Montac
Jamyest Williams
⋅

WLB	MLB	MLB
Sherrod Greene	T. J. Brunson	Bryson-Allen Williams
⋅	Rosendo Louis Jr.	Daniel Fennell
⋅	⋅	⋅

SS
J.T. Ibe
Nick Harvey
⋅

CB
Keisean Nixon
Jaycee Horn
⋅

DE	DT	DT	DE
D. J. Wonnum	Keir Thomas	Javon Kinlaw	Aaron Sterling
Daniel Fennell	Kingsley Enagbare	Kobe Smith	Shameik Blackshear
Brad Johnson	⋅	⋅	⋅

CB
Rashad Fenton
Israel Mukuamu
⋅

Offense

WR
Deebo Samuel
Josh Vann
⋅

WR
Bryan Edwards
OrTre Smith
⋅

LT	LG	C	RG	RT
Dennis Daley	Zack Bailey	Donnell Stanley	Sadarius Hutcherson	Blake Camper
Malik Young	Jovaughn Gwyn	Chandler Farrell	Jordan Rhodes	Dylan Wonnum
⋅	⋅	⋅	⋅	⋅

TE
Jacob August
K.C. Crosby
Kyle Markway Kiel Pollard

WR
Shi Smith
Randrecous Davis
⋅

QB
Jake Bentley
Michael Scarnecchia
⋅

RB
Rico Dowdle
AJ Turner
Ty'Son Williams Mon Denson

Special teams
PK Parker White
PK Alexander Woznick
P Joseph Charlton
P Michael Almond
KR Deebo Samuel
PR Bryan Edwards
LS Ben Asbury
H Danny Gordon

== Game summaries ==
=== Coastal Carolina ===
Coastal Carolina Chanticleers at South Carolina Gamecocks – Game summary

Quarter	1	2	3	4	Total
Coastal Carolina	0	3	3	9	15
South Carolina	14	14	14	7	49

at Williams–Brice Stadium • Columbia, South Carolina

- Date: September 1, 2018
- Game time: 12:00 p.m.
- Game weather: Temperature: 88 °F (31 °C) • Wind: ESE 3 mph (4.8 km/h) • Weather: Partly Cloudy
- Game attendance: 75,126
- Referee: Marc Curles
- TV announcers (SECN): Taylor Zarzour (play-by-play), Matt Stinchcomb (color), Kris Budden (sideline)

Game information

First Quarter

- (12:02) USC – Dowdle 5 yard TD rush, White kick (USC 7–0)
- (05:02) USC – Pollard 8 yard TD pass from Bentley, White kick (USC 14–0)

Second Quarter

- (12:01) CCU – Biscardi 39 yard FG (USC 14–3)
- (06:03) USC – Edwards 24 yard TD pass from Bentley, White kick (USC 21–3)
- (00:14) USC – Dowdle 22 yard TD pass from Bentley, White kick (USC 28–3)

Third Quarter

- (10:03) CCU – Biscardi 39 yard FG (USC 28–6)
- (06:52) USC – Williams 9 yd TD rush, White kick (USC 35–6)
- (01:02) USC – Samuel 8 yard TD pass from Bentley, White kick (USC 42–6)

Fourth Quarter

- (09:49) CCU – Heiligh 8 yard TD pass from Carpenter (USC 42–12)
- (06:45) USC – Davis 27 yard TD pass from Scarnecchia (USC 49–12)
- (02:54) CCU – Biscardi 27 yard FG (USC 49–15)

Total Yards

- CCU – 238; 112 passing yards, 126 rushing yards
- USC – 557; 294 passing yards, 263 rushing yards

Passing leader

- CCU – Keaton Anderson; 11-13, 91 yards, 0 TD, 0 INT
- USC – Jake Bentley; 22-29, 250 yards, 4 TD, 0 INT

Rushing leader

- CCU – Marcus Outlow; 12 rushes, 59 yards, 0 TD
- USC – Rico Dowdle; 15 rushes, 105 yards, 1 TD

Receiving leader

- CCU – Malcolm Williams; 6 catches, 49 yards, 0 TD
- USC – Deebo Samuel; 7 catches, 56 yards, 1 TD

Defensive leader

- CCU – Silas Kelly; 8 tackles, 1 TFL
- USC – Bryson Allen-Williams; 5 tackles, 3 TFL, 1 sack

=== vs No. 3 Georgia ===
Georgia Bulldogs at South Carolina Gamecocks – Game summary

Quarter	1	2	3	4	Total
No. 3 Georgia	17	3	21	0	41
No. 24 South Carolina	7	3	0	7	17

at Williams–Brice Stadium • Columbia, South Carolina

- Date: September 8, 2018
- Game time: 3:30 p.m.
- Game weather: Temperature: 92 °F (33 °C) • Wind:SE 5 mph (8.0 km/h) • Weather: Sunny
- Game attendance: 83,140
- Referee: Matt Loeffler
- TV announcers (CBS): Brad Nessler (play-by-play), Gary Danielson (color), Jamie Erdahl (sideline)

Game information

First Quarter

- (14:13) UGA – Taylor 0 yard fumble recovery, Blankenship kick (UGA 7–0)
- (11:50) UGA – Swift 17 yard run, Blankenship kick (UGA 14–0)
- (07:18) USC – Edwards 13 yard pass from Samuel, White kick (UGA 14–7)
- (00:30) UGA – Blankenship 45 yard field goal (UGA 17–7)

Second Quarter

- (05:57) USC – White 26 yard field goal (UGA 17–10)
- (00:00) UGA – Blankenship 44 yard field goal (UGA 20–10)

Third Quarter

- (12:55) UGA – Hardman 34 yard pass from Fromm, Blankenship kick (UGA 27–10)
- (09:12) UGA – Holyfield 5 yard run, Blankenship kick (UGA 34–10)
- (03:00) UGA – Herrien 15 yard run, Blankenship kick (UGA 41–10)

Fourth Quarter

- (09:59) USC – Edwards 44 yard pass from Bentley, White kick (UGA 41–17)

Total Yards

- UGA – 473; 202 passing yards, 271 rushing yards
- USC – 336; 282 passing yards, 54 rushing yards

Passing leader

- UGA – Jake Fromm; 15-18, 194 yards, 1 TD, 1 INT
- USC – Jake Bentley; 30-47, 269 yards, 1 TD, 2 INT

Rushing leader

- UGA – Elijah Holyfield; 9 rushes, 79 yards, 1 TD
- USC – Ty'Son Williams; 6 rushes, 26 yards, 0 TD

Receiving leader

- UGA – Mecole Hardman; 6 catches, 103 yards, 1 TD
- USC – Bryan Edwards; 7 catches, 111 yards, 2 TD

Defensive leader

- UGA – Richard LeCounte; 7 tackles
- USC – Steven Montac; 4 tackles

=== At Vanderbilt ===
South Carolina Gamecocks at Vanderbilt Commodores – Game summary

Quarter	1	2	3	4	Total
South Carolina	10	10	10	7	37
Vanderbilt	0	14	0	0	14

at Vanderbilt Stadium • Nashville, Tennessee

- Date: September 22, 2018
- Game time: 4:00 p.m.
- Game weather: Temperature: 72 °F (22 °C) • Wind: NE 11 mph (18 km/h) • Weather: Cloudy
- Game attendance: 26,078
- Referee: Matt Austin
- TV announcers (SECN): Taylor Zarzour (play-by-play), Matt Stinchcomb (color), Kris Budden (sideline)

Game information

First Quarter

- (14:05) SC – Smith 38 yard pass from Bentley, White kick (USC 7–0)
- (05:05) SC – White 33 yard FG (USC 10–0)

Second Quarter

- (11:40) VU – Vaughn 2 yard run, Guay kick (USC 10–7)
- (10:22) SC – Dowdle 2 yard run, White kick (USC 17–7)
- (05:23) VU – Lipscomb 2 yard pass from Shurmur, Guay kick (USC 17–14)
- (00:00) SC – White 35 yard FG (USC 20–14)

Third Quarter

- (10:16) SC – White 36 yard FG (USC 23–14)
- (04:06) SC – Denson 1 yard run, White kick (USC 30–14)

Fourth Quarter

- (02:04) SC – Williams 1 yard run, White kick (USC 37–14)

Total Yards

- SC – 534; 261 passing yards, 273 rushing yards
- VU – 284; 192 passing yards, 92 rushing yards

Passing leader

- SC – Jake Bentley; 19–28, 261 yards, 1 TD, 1 INT
- VU – Kyle Shurmur; 18–38, 180 yards, 1 TD, 1 INT

Rushing leader

- SC – Rico Dowdle; 20 rushes, 112 yards, 1 TD
- VU – Jamauri Wakefield; 14 rushes, 74 yards, 0 TD

Receiving leader

- SC – Shi Smith; 5 catches, 119 yards, 1 TD
- VU – Kalija Lipscomb; 9 catches, 72 yards, 1 TD

Defensive leader

- SC – Javon Kinlaw; 4 tackles, 3 TFL, 2 sacks, 2 FF
- VU – LaDarius Wiley; 4 tackles

=== At Kentucky ===
South Carolina Gamecocks at Kentucky Wildcats – Game summary

Quarter	1	2	3	4	Total
South Carolina	3	0	7	0	10
No. 17 Kentucky	3	21	0	0	24

at Commonwealth Stadium • Lexington, Kentucky

- Date: September 29, 2018
- Game time: 7:30 p.m.
- Game weather: Temperature: 70 °F (21 °C) • Wind: NE 6 mph (9.7 km/h) • Weather: Clear
- Game attendance: 63,081
- Referee: Lee Hedrick
- TV announcers (SECN): Tom Hart (play-by-play), Jordan Rodgers (color), Cole Cubelic (sideline)

Game information

First Quarter

- (10:06) UK – Butler 29 yard FG (UK 3–0)
- (05:07) SC – White 29 yard FG (3–3)

Second Quarter

- (14:21) UK – Wilson 1 yard run, Butler kick (UK 10–3)
- (09:15) UK – Rose 24 yard run, Butler kick (UK 17–3)
- (04:53) UK – Snell 4 yard run, Butler kick (UK 24–3)

Third Quarter

- (05:07) SC – Samuel 58 yard pass from Bentley, White kick (UK 24–10)

Total Yards

- SC – 321; 193 passing yards, 128 rushing yards
- UK – 327; 132 passing yards, 195 rushing yards

Passing leader

- SC – Jake Bentley; 13–28, 148 yards, 1 TD, 3 INT
- UK – Terry Wilson; 13–20, 132 yards, 0 TD, 1 INT

Rushing leader

- SC – Rico Dowdle; 13 rushes, 51 yards, 0 TD
- UK – Benny Snell; 28 rushes, 107 yards, 1 TD

Receiving leader

- SC – Deebo Samuel; 2 catches, 61 yards, 1 TD
- UK – C. J. Conrad; 3 catches, 31 yards, 0 TD

Defensive leader

- SC – T. J. Brunson; 8 total tackles, 2 TFL
- UK – Josh Allen; 8 total tackles, 4 TFL, 3 sacks, 1 FF

=== Missouri ===
Missouri Tigers at South Carolina Gamecocks – Game summary

Quarter	1	2	3	4	Total
Missouri	14	9	0	12	35
South Carolina	7	7	17	6	37

at Williams–Brice Stadium • Columbia, South Carolina

- Date: October 6, 2018
- Game time: 12:00 p.m.
- Game weather: Temperature: 86 °F (30 °C) • Wind: ESE 2 mph (3.2 km/h) • Weather: Partly cloudy
- Game attendance: 73,393
- Referee: David Smith
- TV announcers (SECN): Taylor Zarzour (play-by-play), Matt Stinchcomb (color), Kris Budden (sideline)

Game information

First Quarter

- (11:58) MU – Rountree 1 yard TD run, Tucker kick (MU 7–0)
- (11:02) SC – Edwards 5 yard pass from Scarnecchia, White kick (7–7)
- (04:25) MU – Crockett 1 yard TD run, Tucker kick (MU 14–7)

Second Quarter

- (14:53) MU – McCann 22 yard field goal (MU 17–7)
- (12:57) SC – Edwards 17 yard pass from Scarnecchia, White kick (MU 17–14)
- (06:16) MU – McCann 32 yard field goal (MU 20–14)
- (00:23) MU – McCann 22 yard field goal (MU 23–14)

Third Quarter

- (09:34) SC – Samuel 8 yard pass from Scarnecchia, White kick (MU 23–21)
- (05:15) SC – White 42 yard field goal (SC 24–23)
- (05:00) SC – Greene 12 yard interception, White kick (SC 31–23)

Fourth Quarter

- (13:54) MU – Rountree 2 yard TD run, Lock pass failed (SC 31–29)
- (11:01) MU – McCann 44 yard field goal (MU 32–31)
- (06:23) SC – White 42 yard field goal (SC 34–32)
- (01:18) MU – McCann 57 yard field goal (MU 35–34)
- (00:02) SC – White 33 yard field goal (SC 37–35)

Total Yards

- MU – 490; 204 passing yards, 286 rushing yards
- SC – 377; 249 passing yards, 128 rushing yards

Passing leader

- MU – Drew Lock; 17–36, 204 yards, 0 TD, 2 INT
- SC – Mike Scarnecchia; 20–35, 249 yards, 3 TD, 0 INT

Rushing leader

- MU – Damarea Crockett; 20 rushes, 158 yards, 1 TD
- SC – Rico Dowdle; 21 rushes, 62 yards, 0 TD

Receiving leader

- MU – Jalen Knox; 2 catches, 50 yards, 0 TD
- SC – Deebo Samuel; 4 catches, 88 yards, 1 TD

Defensive leader

- MU – Terez Hall; 11 total tackles, 3 TFL, 1 sack
- SC – Bryson Allen-Williams; 6 total tackles, 3 TFL, 1 sack

=== Texas A&M ===
Texas A&M Aggies at South Carolina Gamecocks – Game summary

Quarter	1	2	3	4	Total
No. 22 Texas A&M	3	10	3	10	26
South Carolina	0	0	16	7	23

at Williams–Brice Stadium • Columbia, South Carolina

- Date: October 13, 2018
- Game time: 3:30 p.m.
- Game weather: Temperature: 76 °F (24 °C) • Wind: NNE 3 mph (4.8 km/h) • Weather: Sunny
- Game attendance: 76,871
- Referee: Hubert Owens
- TV announcers (SECN): Taylor Zarzour (play-by-play), Matt Stinchcomb (color)

Game information

First Quarter

- (00:31) A&M – Small 52 yard FG (A&M 3–0)

Second Quarter

- (04:19) A&M – Sternberger 4 yard pass from Mond, Small kick (A&M 10–0)
- (00:00) A&M – Small 20 yard FG (A&M 13–0)

Third Quarter

- (08:36) A&M – Small 32 yard FG (A&M 16–0)
- (04:54) USC – Smith 22 yard pass from Bentley, Edwards pass (A&M 16–8)
- (00:24) USC – Dawkins 33 yard pass from Bentley, Edwards pass (16–16)

Fourth Quarter

- (09:16) A&M – Small 39 yard FG (A&M 19–16)
- (01:36) A&M – Williams 3 yard run, Small kick (A&M 26–16)
- (00:48) USC – Samuel 6 yard pass from Bentley, White kick (A&M 26–23)

Total Yards

- A&M – 458; 353 passing yards, 105 rushing yards
- USC – 299; 223 passing yards, 76 rushing yards

Passing leader

- A&M – Kellen Mond; 25–37, 353 yards, 1 TD, 0 INT
- USC – Jake Bentley; 17–35, 223 yards, 3 TD, 1 INT

Rushing leader

- A&M – Trayveon Williams; 19 rushes, 82 yards, 1 TD
- USC – Ty'Son Williams; 7 rushes, 51 yards, 0 TD

Receiving leader

- A&M – Jace Sternberger; 7 catches, 145 yards, 1 TD
- USC – Deebo Samuel; 7 catches, 88 yards, 1 TD

Defensive leader

- A&M – Donovan Wilson; 7 total tackles
- USC – Sherrod Greene; 12 total tackles, 1 TFL

=== Tennessee ===
Tennessee Volunteers at South Carolina Gamecocks – Game summary

Quarter	1	2	3	4	Total
Tennessee	7	7	10	0	24
South Carolina	3	6	15	3	27

at Williams–Brice Stadium • Columbia, South Carolina

- Date: October 27, 2018
- Game time: 7:30 p.m.
- Game weather: Temperature: 60 °F (16 °C) • Wind: W 11 mph (18 km/h) • Weather: Partly Cloudy
- Game attendance: 80,614
- Referee: James Carter
- TV announcers (SECN): Tom Hart (play-by-play), Jordan Rodgers (color), Cole Cubelic (sideline)

Game information

First Quarter

- (04:53) UT – Wolf 5 yard pass from Guarantano, Cimaglia kick (UT 7–0)
- (00:37) SC – White 19 yard field goal (UT 7–3)

Second Quarter

- (02:11) UT – Jennings 6 yard pass from Guarantano, Cimaglia kick (UT 14–3)
- (00:49) SC – Samuel 3 yard pass from Bentley (UT 14–9)

Third Quarter

- (10:02) UT – Fils-Aime 14 yard run, Cimaglia kick (UT 21–9)
- (08:05) SC – Dowdle 1 yard run, White kick (UT 21–16)
- (01:47) UT – Cimaglia 45 yard field goal (UT 24–16)
- (00:05) SC – Williams 1 yard run, Bentley rush (24–24)

Fourth Quarter

- (05:52) SC – White 25 yard field goal (SC 27–24)

Total Yards

- UT – 351; 207 passing yards, 144 rushing yards
- SC – 376; 152 passing yards, 224 rushing yards

Passing leader

- UT – Jarrett Guarantano; 27–39, 207 yards, 2 TD, 0 INT
- SC – Jake Bentley; 11–16, 152 yards, 1 TD, 1 INT

Rushing leader

- UT – Tim Jordan; 12 rushes, 63 yards, 0 TD
- SC – Rico Dowdle; 14 rushes, 140 yards, 1 TD

Receiving leader

- UT – Marquez Callaway; 9 catches, 86 yards, 0 TD
- SC – Bryan Edwards; 3 catches, 96 yards, 0 TD

Defensive leader

- UT – Nigel Warrior; 9 total tackles
- SC – T. J. Brunson; 14 total tackles

=== At Ole Miss ===
South Carolina Gamecocks at Ole Miss Rebels – Game summary

Quarter	1	2	3	4	OT	Total
South Carolina	17	10	7	14	0	48
Ole Miss	3	24	10	7	0	44

at Vaught-Hemmingway Stadium • Oxford, Mississippi

- Date: November 3, 2018
- Game time: 12:00 p.m.
- Game weather: Temperature: 66 °F (19 °C) • Wind: • Weather: Sunny
- Game attendance: 56,798
- Referee: Marc Curles
- TV announcers (SECN): Taylor Zarzour (play-by-play), Matt Stinchcomb (color), Kris Budden (sideline)

Game information

First Quarter

- (14:43) USC – Samuel 90 yard kickoff return, White kick (USC 7–0)
- (11:15) MISS – Logan 25 yard field goal (USC 7–3)
- (09:12) USC – Williams 2 yard run, White kick (USC 14–3)
- (02:38) USC – White 20 yard field goal (USC 17–3)

Second Quarter

- (13:46) MISS – Phillips 9 yardd run, Logan kick (USC 17–10)
- (07:52) MISS – Logan 26 yard field goal (USC 17–13)
- (07:41) USC – Edwards 75 yard pass from Bentley, White kick (USC 24–13)
- (06:22) MISS – Ta'amu 17 yard run, Logan kick (USC 24–20)
- (02:01) USC – White 23 yard field goal (USC 27–20)
- (00:10) MISS – Phillips 1 yard run, Logan kick (27–27)

Third Quarter

- (11:56) MISS – Logan 31 yard field goal (MISS 30–27)
- (10:05) USC – Vann 5 yard pass from Bentley, White kick (USC 34–30)
- (02:50) MISS – Phillips 2 yard run, Logan kick (MISS 37–34)

Fourth Quarter

- (14:15) MISS – Woullard 1 yard run (MISS 44–34)
- (11:01) USC – Turner 3 yard run, White kick (MISS 44–41)
- (05:50) USC – Bentley 4 yard run, White kick (USC 48–44)

Total Yards

- USC – 510; 363 passing yards, 147 rushing yards
- MISS – 616; 379 passing yards, 237 rushing yards

Passing leader

- USC – Jake Bentley; 22–32, 363 yards, 2 TD, 0 INT
- MISS – Jordan Ta'amu; 31–46, 379 yards, 0 TD, 0 INT

Rushing leader

- USC – Mon Denson; 12 rushes, 102 yards, 0 TD
- MISS – Scottie Phillips; 21 rushes, 150 yards, 3 TD

Receiving leader

- USC – Bryan Edwards; 4 catches, 109 yards, 1 TD
- MISS – Elijah Moore; 11 catches, 129 yards, 0 TD

Defensive leader

- USC – T. J. Brunson; 15 total tackles, 3.5 TFL, 1.5 sacks
- MISS – Mohamed Sanogo; 11 total tackles, 1 TFL, 1 sack

=== At Florida ===
South Carolina Gamecocks at Florida Gators – Game summary

Quarter	1	2	3	4	Total
South Carolina	14	7	10	0	31
No. 19 Florida	0	14	7	14	35

at Ben Hill Griffin Stadium • Gainesville, Florida

- Date: November 10, 2018
- Game time: 12:00 p.m.
- Game weather: Temperature: 68 °F (20 °C) • Wind: N 8 mph (13 km/h) • Weather: Cloudy
- Game attendance: 82,696
- Referee: David Smith
- TV announcers (ESPN): Dave Pasch (play-by-play), Greg McElroy (color), Tom Luginbill (sideline)

Game information

First Quarter

- (09:17) SC – August 2 yard pass from Bentley, White kick (SC 7–0)
- (04:51) SC – Markway 19 yard pass from Bentley, White kick (SC 14–0)

Second Quarter

- (13:46) UF – Perine 2 yard run, McPherson kick (SC 14–7)
- (08:58) UF – Franks 10 yard run, McPherson kick (14–14)
- (04:21) SC – Bentley 1 yard run, White kick (SC 21–14)

Third Quarter

- (09:19) SC – White 34 yard field goal (SC 24–14)
- (04:41) SC – Dowdle 4 yard run, White kick (SC 31–14)
- (00:56) UF – Toney 18 yard pass from Franks, McPherson kick (SC 31–21)

Fourth Quarter

- (11:03) UF – Perine 23 yard run, McPherson kick (SC 31–28)
- (04:09) UF – Franks 1 yard run, McPherson kick (UF 35–31)

Total Yards

- SC – 386; 239 passing yards, 147 rushing yards
- UF – 528; 161 passing yards, 367 rushing yards

Passing leader

- SC – Jake Bentley; 18–28, 239 yards, 2 TD, 1 INT
- UF – Feleipe Franks; 15–21, 161 yards, 1 TD, 0 INT

Rushing leader

- SC – A.J. Turner; 12 rushes, 84 yards, 0 TD
- UF – Jordan Scarlett; 18 rushes, 159 yards, 0 TD

Receiving leader

- SC – Deebo Samuel; 4 catches, 120 yards, 0 TD
- UF – Josh Hammond; 5 catches, 35 yards, 0 TD

Defensive leader

- SC – T. J. Brunson; 16 total tackles, 3 TFL, 2 sacks, 1 FF
- UF – David Reese; 10 total tackles

=== Chattanooga ===
Chattanooga Mocs at South Carolina Gamecocks – Game summary

Quarter	1	2	3	4	Total
Chattanooga	0	3	0	6	9
South Carolina	14	14	7	14	49

at Williams–Brice Stadium • Columbia, South Carolina

- Date: November 17, 2018
- Game time: 7:30 p.m.
- Game weather: Temperature: 72 °F (22 °C) • Wind: Calm • Weather: Clear
- Game attendance: 72,832
- Referee: Ken Williamson
- TV announcers (SECN): Mike Morgan (play-by-play), Barrett Jones (color), Alyssa Lang (sideline)

Game information

First Quarter

- (09:53) USC – Turner 16 yard pass from Bentley, White kick (USC 7–0)
- (04:16) USC – Turner 6 yard pass from Bentley, White kick (USC 14–0)

Second Quarter

- (14:55) UTC – Ulmo 36 yard field goal (USC 14–3)
- (13:44) USC – Turner 16 yard run, White kick (USC 21–3)
- (00:34) USC – Denson 1 yard run, White kick (USC 28–3)

Third Quarter

- (13:32) USC – Smith 53 yard pass from Bentley, White kick (USC 35–3)

Fourth Quarter

- (14:48) USC – Samuel 61 yard pass from Bentley, White kick (USC 42–3)
- (10:51) USC – Fenwick 2 yard run, Woznick kick (USC 49–3)
- (04:52) UTC – Tiano 2 yard pass from Nunnelly (USC 49–9)

Total Yards

- UTC – 334; 256 passing yards, 78 rushing yards
- USC – 602; 364 passing yards, 238 rushing yards

Passing leader

- UTC – Nick Tiano; 17–36, 254 yards, 0 TD, 1 INT
- USC – Jake Bentley; 25–29, 339 yards, 4 TD, 0 INT

Rushing leader

- UTC – Tyrell Price; 9 rushes, 42 yards, 0 TD
- USC – Deshaun Fenwick; 17 rushes, 115 yards, 1 TD

Receiving leader

- UTC – Bryce Nunnelly; 5 catches, 141 yards, 0 TD
- USC – Deebo Samuel; 5 catches, 112 yards, 1 TD

Defensive leader

- UTC – Tavon Lawson; 11 total tackles, 1 TFL
- USC – Ernest Jones; 5 total tackles, 1 FF

=== At Clemson ===
South Carolina Gamecocks at Clemson Tigers – Game summary

Quarter	1	2	3	4	Total
South Carolina	7	14	0	14	35
No. 2 Clemson	14	14	14	14	56

at Memorial Stadium • Clemson, South Carolina

- Date: November 24, 2018
- Game time: 7:00 p.m.
- Game weather: Temperature: 49 °F (9 °C) • Wind: NNW 2 • Weather: Clear
- Game attendance: 81,406
- Referee: Matt Loeffler
- TV announcers (ESPN): Steve Levy (play-by-play), Brian Griese (color), Todd McShay (sideline)

Game information

First Quarter

- (10:41) SC – Samuel 9 yard pass from Bentley, White kick (SC 7–0)
- (06:17) CU – Choice 1 yard run, Huegel kick (7–7)
- (00:17) CU – Higgins 22 yard pass from Lawrence, Huegel kick (CU 14–7)

Second Quarter

- (07:23) CU – Wilkins 1 yard run, Huegel kick (CU 21–7)
- (06:29) SC – Pollard 67 yard pass from Bentley, White kick (CU 21–14)
- (04:49) CU – Choice 2 yard run, Huegel kick (CU 28–14)
- (04:37) SC – Samuel 75 yard pass from Bentley, White kick (CU 28–21)

Third Quarter

- (10:21) CU – Etienne 2 yard run, Huegel kick (CU 35–21)
- (06:46) CU – Feaster 13 yard run, Huegel kick (CU 42–21)

Fourth Quarter

- (12:05) CU – Choice 15 yard run, Huegel kick (CU 49–21)
- (09:10) SC – Samuel 32 yard pass from Bentley, White kick (CU 49–28)
- (03:37) SC – Smith 20 yard pass from Bentley, White kick (CU 49–35)
- (00:39) CU – Etienne 7 yard run, Huegel kick (CU 56–35)

Total Yards

- SC – 600; 510 passing yards, 90 rushing yards
- CU – 744; 393 passing yards, 351 rushing yards

Passing leader

- SC – Jake Bentley; 32–50, 510 yards, 5 TD, 1 INT
- CU – Trevor Lawrence; 27–36, 393 yards, 1 TD, 0 INT

Rushing leader

- SC – Mon Denson; 17 rushes, 64 yards, 0 TD
- CU – Travis Etienne; 28 rushes, 150 yards, 2 TD

Receiving leader

- SC – Deebo Samuel; 10 catches, 210 yards, 3 TD
- CU – Tee Higgins; 6 catches, 142 yards, 1 TD

Defensive leader

- SC – R. J. Roderick; 10 total tackles
- CU – Isaiah Simmons; 10 total tackles

=== Akron ===
Akron Zips at South Carolina Gamecocks – Game summary

Quarter	1	2	3	4	Total
Akron	3	0	0	0	3
South Carolina	14	14	0	0	28

at Williams–Brice Stadium • Columbia, South Carolina

- Date: December 1, 2018
- Game time: 12:00 p.m.
- Game weather: Temperature: 56 °F (13 °C) • Wind: SE 3 mph (4.8 km/h) • Weather: Showers
- Game attendance: 53,420
- Referee: James Carter
- TV announcers (SECN): Taylor Zarzour (play-by-play), Cole Cublic (color), Dawn Davenport (sideline)

Game information

First Quarter

- (09:29) SC – Samuel 15 yard pass from Bentley, White kick (SC 7–0)
- (03:59) UA – Nick Gasser 45 yard field goal (SC 7–3)
- (03:01) SC – Edwards 70 yard pass from Bentley, White kick (SC 14–3)

Second Quarter

- (08:09) SC – Samuel 0 yard fumble recovery, White kick (SC 21–3)
- (01:33) SC – Samuel 5 yard pass from Bentley, White kick (SC 28–3)

Total Yards

- UA – 260; 178 passing yards, 82 rushing yards
- SC – 384; 199 passing yards, 185 rushing yards

Passing leader

- UA – Kato Nelson; 19–39 178 yards, 0 TD, 0 INT
- SC – Jake Bentley; 14–27, 199 yards, 3 TD, 2 INT

Rushing leader

- UA – Keyondre White; 13 rushes, 57 yards, 0 TD
- SC – Mon Denson; 17 rushes, 113 yards, 0 TD

Receiving leader

- UA – Kwad Smith; 6 catches, 69 yards, 0 TD
- SC – Bryan Edwards; 5 catches, 109 yards, 1 TD

Defensive leader

- UA – Zaire Jacobs ; 8 total tackles, 1 FF
- SC – Kingsley Enagbare; 6 total tackles, 2 TFL, 1 sack

=== Vs. Virginia (Belk Bowl) ===
Virginia Cavaliers vs. South Carolina Gamecocks – Game summary

Quarter	1	2	Total
Virginia			0
South Carolina			0

at Bank of America Stadium • Charlotte, NC

- Date: December 29, 2018
- Game time: 12:00 p.m.
- Game weather: Temperature: • Wind: • Weather:
- TV announcers (ABC): Adam Amin (play-by-play), Anthony Becht (color), Rocky Boiman (color)

Game information

First Quarter

Second Quarter

Third Quarter

Fourth Quarter

Total Yards

- UVA –
- USC –

Passing leader

- UVA –
- USC –

Rushing leader

- UVA –
- USC –

Receiving leader

- UVA –
- USC –

Defensive leader

- UVA –
- USC –

== Rankings ==
Ranking movements Legend: ██ Increase in ranking ██ Decrease in ranking — = Not ranked RV = Received votes
	Week															
Poll	Pre	1	2	3	4	5	6	7	8	9	10	11	12	13	14	Final
AP	RV	24	RV	RV	RV	—	RV	—	—	—	—	—	—	—	—	—
Coaches	RV	24	RV	RV	RV	RV	RV	RV	RV	RV	RV	—	RV	—	—	—
CFP	Not released									—	—	—	—	—	—	Not released

== Players drafted into the NFL ==
Round	Pick	Player	Position	NFL club
2	36	Deebo Samuel	WR	San Francisco 49ers
6	201	Rashad Fenton	CB	Kansas City Chiefs
6	212	Dennis Daley	OT	Carolina Panthers
