= 2016 South Carolina Gamecocks football team =

American college football season

2016 South Carolina Gamecocks football

Birmingham Bowl, L 39–46 ^{OT} vs. South Florida
- Conference: Southeastern Conference
- East Division
- Record: 6–7 (3–5 SEC)
- Head coach: Will Muschamp (1st season)
- Offensive coordinator: Kurt Roper (1st season)
- Co-offensive coordinator: Bryan McClendon (1st season)
- Offensive scheme: Spread
- Defensive coordinator: Travaris Robinson (1st season)
- Base defense: Multiple 4–3
- Home stadium: Williams-Brice Stadium

2016 Southeastern Conference football standings
| | Conf. | | | Overall |
| Team | W | | L | W | | L |
|---|---|---|---|---|---|---|
Eastern Division
| No. 14 Florida x | 6 | – | 2 | 9 | – | 4 |
| No. 22 Tennessee | 4 | – | 4 | 9 | – | 4 |
| Georgia | 4 | – | 4 | 8 | – | 5 |
| Kentucky | 4 | – | 4 | 7 | – | 6 |
| South Carolina | 3 | – | 5 | 6 | – | 7 |
| Vanderbilt | 3 | – | 5 | 6 | – | 7 |
| Missouri* | 2 | – | 6 | 4 | – | 8 |
Western Division
| No. 2 Alabama x$^ | 8 | – | 0 | 14 | – | 1 |
| No. 24 Auburn | 5 | – | 3 | 8 | – | 5 |
| No. 13 LSU | 5 | – | 3 | 8 | – | 4 |
| Texas A&M | 4 | – | 4 | 8 | – | 5 |
| Arkansas | 3 | – | 5 | 7 | – | 6 |
| Mississippi State | 3 | – | 5 | 6 | – | 7 |
| Ole Miss* | 2 | – | 6 | 5 | – | 7 |
Championship: Alabama 54, Florida 16
^ – College Football Playoff participant; $ – Conference champion; x – Division champion/co-champions; * Ole Miss and Missouri vacated all wins due to NCAA violations.; Rankings from AP Poll

The 2016 South Carolina Gamecocks football team represented the University of South Carolina in the 2016 NCAA Division I FBS football season. The Gamecocks played their home games at Williams–Brice Stadium in Columbia, South Carolina and competed in the East Division of the Southeastern Conference (SEC). The Gamecocks' first-year head coach was Will Muschamp, with Kurt Roper as offensive coordinator and Travaris Robinson as defensive coordinator. They finished the season 6–7, 3–5 in SEC play to finish in fifth place in the East Division. They were invited to the Birmingham Bowl, where they lost to No. 25 South Florida in overtime.

Following a 2–4 start, freshman Jake Bentley became the starting quarterback and led the Gamecocks to a 4–3 finish, including an upset over No. 18 Tennessee. South Carolina had a three-win improvement over the previous year and returned to the postseason, but finished with a second consecutive losing season.

== Schedule ==
South Carolina announced its 2016 football schedule on October 29, 2015. The 2016 schedule consisted of seven home and five away games in the regular season. The Gamecocks hosted SEC foes Georgia, Missouri, Tennessee, and Texas A&M, and traveled to Florida, Kentucky, Mississippi State, and Vanderbilt.

For the tenth year, the Gamecocks opened their season on a Thursday. The team hosted three out of four of its non–conference games which were against Clemson (from the ACC), East Carolina (from the American), Massachusetts (from the MAC), and Western Carolina (from the Southern Conference).

| Date | Time | Opponent | Site | TV | Result | Attendance |
|---|---|---|---|---|---|---|
| September 1 | 8:00 p.m. | at Vanderbilt | Vanderbilt Stadium; Nashville, TN | ESPN | W 13–10 | 30,304 |
| September 10 | 7:00 p.m. | at Mississippi State | Davis Wade Stadium; Starkville, MS (SEC Nation) | ESPN2 | L 14–27 | 57,763 |
| September 17 | 4:00 p.m. | East Carolina* | Williams-Brice Stadium; Columbia, SC | SECN | W 20–15 | 80,384 |
| September 24 | 7:30 p.m. | at Kentucky | Commonwealth Stadium; Lexington, KY | SECN | L 10–17 | 51,702 |
| October 1 | 4:00 p.m. | No. 9 Texas A&M | Williams-Brice Stadium; Columbia, SC | SECN | L 13–24 | 78,245 |
| October 9^{[a]} | 2:30 p.m. | Georgia | Williams-Brice Stadium; Columbia, SC (rivalry) | SECN | L 14–28 | 77,221 |
| October 22 | 12:00 p.m. | Massachusetts* | Williams-Brice Stadium; Columbia, SC | SECN | W 34–28 | 73,428 |
| October 29 | 7:15 p.m. | No. 18 Tennessee | Williams-Brice Stadium; Columbia, SC (rivalry) | ESPN2 | W 24–21 | 78,696 |
| November 5 | 4:00 p.m. | Missouri^{†} | Williams-Brice Stadium; Columbia, SC (Mayor's Cup) | SECN | W 31–21 | 73,817 |
| November 12 | 12:00 p.m. | at No. 22 Florida | Ben Hill Griffin Stadium; Gainesville, FL (SEC Nation) | CBS | L 7–20 | 89,614 |
| November 19 | 4:00 p.m. | Western Carolina* | Williams-Brice Stadium; Columbia, SC | SECN | W 44–31 | 76,650 |
| November 26 | 7:30 p.m. | at No. 4 Clemson* | Memorial Stadium; Clemson, SC (Palmetto Bowl) | ESPN | L 7–56 | 81,542 |
| December 29 | 2:00 p.m. | vs. No. 25 South Florida* | Legion Field; Birmingham, AL (Birmingham Bowl) | ESPN | L 39–46 ^{OT} | 31,229 |
*Non-conference game; ^{†}Homecoming; Rankings from AP Poll released prior to game; All times are in Eastern time

^{^[a]}The game between South Carolina and Georgia on October 8, 2016, was postponed due to Hurricane Matthew, and was rescheduled the following day on October 9, 2016.
Schedule source:

== Roster ==
2016 South Carolina Gamecocks football team roster
Players
Coaches
Offense

| Pos. | # | Name | Class |
|---|---|---|---|
| WR | 1 | Deebo Samuel | So |
| WR | 3 | K. C. Crosby | So |
| QB | 4 | Jake Bentley | Fr |
| WR | 5 | Terry Googer | So |
| WR | 8 | Randrecous Davis | Fr |
| WR | 9 | Jerad Washington | Fr |
| QB | 10 | Perry Orth | Sr |
| QB | 11 | Brandon McIlwain | Fr |
| WR | 12 | Korey Banks | Fr |
| QB | 12 | Michael Scarnecchia | So |
| WR | 13 | Shi Smith | Fr |
| WR | 14 | Jamari Smith | Jr |
| WR | 15 | Matrick Belton | Sr |
| QB | 16 | Bailey Hart | Fr |
| QB | 18 | Danny Gordon | So |
| WR | 22 | Montray Feaster | Fr |
| RB | 23 | Rico Dowdle | Fr |
| WR | 24 | Garrett Frederick | Fr |
| RB | 25 | A. J. Turner | Fr |
| RB | 27 | Ty'Son Williams | So |
| RB | 30 | Darius Paulk | Sr |
| RB | 32 | Rod Talley | Jr |
| RB | 33 | David Williams | Jr |
| RB | 34 | Mon Denson | Fr |
| RB | 36 | C. J. Freeman | Fr |
| TE | 39 | Rivers Bedenbaugh | Jr |
| TE | 40 | Jacob August | So |
| RB | 44 | Adrian McGee | Fr |
| OL | 50 | Sadarius Hutcherson | Fr |
| OL | 51 | Cory Helms | Jr |
| OL | 55 | Christian Pellage | So |
| OL | 60 | Chandler Farrell | Fr |
| OL | 61 | Cameron Johnson | Fr |
| OL | 63 | Blake Camper | So |
| OL | 65 | Pika Leota | Fr |
| OL | 66 | Will Putnam | Fr |
| OL | 67 | Ryan Green | So |
| OL | 69 | D. J. Park | Jr |
| OL | 70 | Alan Knott | Jr |
| OL | 71 | Eric Douglas | Fr |
| OL | 72 | Donell Stanley | So |
| OL | 73 | Summie Carlay | Fr |
| OL | 74 | Mason Zandi | Sr |
| OL | 77 | Malik Young | So |
| OL | 78 | Zack Bailey | So |
| OL | 79 | Trey Derouen | Fr |
| WR | 80 | Shemar Glenn | Fr |
| TE | 81 | Hayden Hurst | So |
| TE | 82 | Evan Hinson | Fr |
| WR | 83 | Chavis Dawkins | Fr |
| TE | 84 | Kyle Markway | So |
| WR | 85 | Devin Dingle | Fr |
| TE | 86 | Robert Tucker III | Fr |
| TE | 87 | Kiel Pollard | Fr |
| WR | 88 | Javon Charleston | Fr |
| WR | 89 | Bryan Edwards | Fr |

Defense

| Pos. | # | Name | Class |
|---|---|---|---|
| DB | 3 | Chris Lammons | Jr |
| LB | 4 | Bryson Allen-Williams | Jr |
| DL | 5 | Darius English | Sr |
| LB | 6 | Chris Moody | Sr |
| DB | 7 | Jamarcus King | Jr |
| DL | 8 | Marquavius Lewis | Sr |
| LB | 9 | Sherrod Pittman | Fr |
| LB | 10 | Skai Moore | Sr |
| LB | 11 | T. J. Holloman | Sr |
| DB | 12 | Kaleb Chalmers | So |
| LB | 13 | Jalen Dread | So |
| DB | 16 | Rashad Fenton | So |
| DB | 17 | Chaz Elder | Sr |
| DL | 18 | Keir Thomas | Fr |
| DB | 21 | Antoine Wilder | Fr |
| DB | 22 | Steven Montac | So |
| LB | 23 | Larenz Bryant | Sr |
| DB | 24 | D. J. Smith | Jr |
| DB | 26 | Jasper Sasser | Jr |
| LB | 28 | Jonathan Walton | Sr |
| DB | 30 | Shannon James | Sr |
| DB | 31 | Chris Smith | Fr |
| LB | 32 | Brett Shore | Jr |
| DB | 34 | Scott Grant | So |
| DL | 35 | Daniel Fennell | Fr |
| DB | 36 | Morgan Vest | Fr |
| DB | 39 | Demetrius Smalls | Jr |
| DB | 40 | Jason Senn | Fr |
| LB | 41 | Tyler Ragsdale | Fr |
| DB | 42 | Jordan Diggs | Sr |
| DB | 43 | Benji Russell | Jr |
| LB | 44 | T. J. Brunson | Fr |
| LB | 45 | Spencer Eason-Riddle | Fr |
| LB | 46 | Trey Mitchell | Fr |
| DL | 48 | Dexter Wideman | Fr |
| DL | 49 | Boosie Whitlow | So |
| DL | 50 | Griffin Gentry | Fr |
| DL | 52 | Jajuan Blankenship | Fr |
| LB | 57 | Hassan Belton | So |
| DL | 61 | Javion Duncan | So |
| DL | 90 | Taylor Stallworth | Jr |
| DL | 91 | Shameik Blackshear | Fr |
| DL | 92 | D. J. Wonnum | Fr |
| DL | 93 | Ulric Jones | Jr |
| DL | 94 | Kelsey Griffin | Sr |
| DL | 95 | Dante Sawyer | Jr |
| DL | 96 | Aaron Thompson | Fr |
| DL | 97 | Kobe Smith | Fr |
| DL | 98 | Stephon Taylor | Fr |
| DL | 99 | Abu Lamin | Sr |

Special teams

| Pos. | # | Name | Class |
|---|---|---|---|
| P | 13 | Sean Kelly | Sr |
| K/P | 20 | Joseph Charlton | Fr |
| K | 29 | Elliott Fry | Sr |
| K | 42 | Alexander Woznick | Fr |
| LS | 45 | Ben Asbury | So |
| LS | 46 | Harrison Freeman | Fr |
| LS | 47 | Drew Williams | Sr |
| LS | 48 | Nick McGriff | So |
| LS | 59 | Logan Crane | Fr |
| K/P | 85 | Michael Almond | Fr |
| LS | 90 | Wyman Baxley | Fr |

Head coach

- Will Muschamp

Coordinators/assistant coaches

Legend

- (C) Team captain
- (S) Suspended
- (I) Ineligible
- Injured
- Redshirt

Roster
