= 2018 Belk Bowl =

College football bowl game

- 17th Belk Bowl
South Carolina Gamecocks	Virginia Cavaliers
(7–5)	(7–5)
SEC	ACC
0	28
Head coach: Will Muschamp	Head coach: Bronco Mendenhall
	1	2	3	4	Total
South Carolina	0	0	0	0	0
Virginia	7	7	7	7	28
- Date: December 29, 2018
- Season: 2018
- Stadium: Bank of America Stadium
- Location: Charlotte, North Carolina
- MVP: Olamide Zaccheaus (WR, Virginia)
- Favorite: South Carolina by 3.5
- Referee: Jeff Servinski (Big Ten)
- Attendance: 48,263
- Payout: US$4,506,000

United States TV coverage
- Network: ABC & ESPN Radio
- Announcers: Adam Amin, Anthony Becht and Rocky Boiman (ABC); Taylor Zarzour, Matt Stinchcomb and Kris Budden (ESPN Radio)

The 2018 Belk Bowl was a college football bowl game played on December 29, 2018. It was the 17th edition of the Belk Bowl, and one of the 2018–19 bowl games concluding the 2018 FBS football season. The game was sponsored by the department store chain Belk. With the bowl contested by two nearby public universities, attendance to the game increased by some 15,000 spectators over the previous year and had its highest attendance total since 2011.

Virginia shut out South Carolina, 28–0. This was the largest margin of victory in the history of the Belk Bowl. With the victory, the Virginia Cavaliers became the winningest team all-time in the Belk Bowl, and improved their record in Bank of America Stadium to 3–0 after winning the first two editions of the bowl in 2002 and 2003.

== Teams ==
The game was played between South Carolina from the Southeastern Conference (SEC) and Virginia from the Atlantic Coast Conference (ACC). In prior games between the two programs, South Carolina held a 21–13–1 lead in the series.

=== South Carolina Gamecocks ===
South Carolina received and accepted a bid to the Belk Bowl on December 2. The Gamecocks entered the bowl with a 7–5 record (4–4 in conference).

=== Virginia Cavaliers ===
Virginia received and accepted a bid to the Belk Bowl on December 2. The Cavaliers entered the bowl with a 7–5 record (4–4 in conference).

== Game summary ==
=== Scoring summary ===
Scoring summary

Quarter	Time	Drive			Team	Scoring information	Score	
Quarter	Time	Plays	Yards	TOP	Team	Scoring information	SC	UVA
1	3:30	13	77	6:31	UVA	Olamide Zaccheaus 6-yard touchdown reception from Bryce Perkins, Brian Delaney kick good	0	7
2	0:42	14	90	8:10	UVA	Jordan Ellis 9-yard touchdown run, Brian Delaney kick good	0	14
3	7:14	8	39	4:25	UVA	Olamide Zaccheaus 10-yard touchdown reception from Bryce Perkins, Bryan Delaney kick good	0	21
4	6:54	8	64	5:00	UVA	Olamide Zacchaeus 12-yard touchdown reception from Bryce Perkins, Bryan Delaney kick good	0	28
"TOP" = time of possession. For other American football terms, see Glossary of American football.							0	28

=== Statistics ===
	1	2	3	4	Total
Gamecocks	0	0	0	0	0
Cavaliers	7	7	7	7	28

Statistics	SC	UVA
First downs	12	28
Plays–yards	59–261	79–413
Rushes–yards	19–43	48–205
Passing yards	218	208
Passing: comp–att–int	17–40–2	22–31–0
Time of possession	17:25	42:35

Team	Category	Player	Statistics
South Carolina	Passing	Jake Bentley	17/40, 218 yds, 2 INT
South Carolina	Rushing	Rico Dowdle	6 car, 21 yds
South Carolina	Receiving	Shi Smith	6 rec, 76 yds
Virginia	Passing	Bryce Perkins	22/31, 208 yds, 3 TD
Virginia	Rushing	Jordan Ellis	26 car, 106 yds, 1 TD
Virginia	Receiving	Olamide Zaccheaus	12 rec, 100 yds, 3 TD
