= Rashad Fenton =

American football player (born 1997)

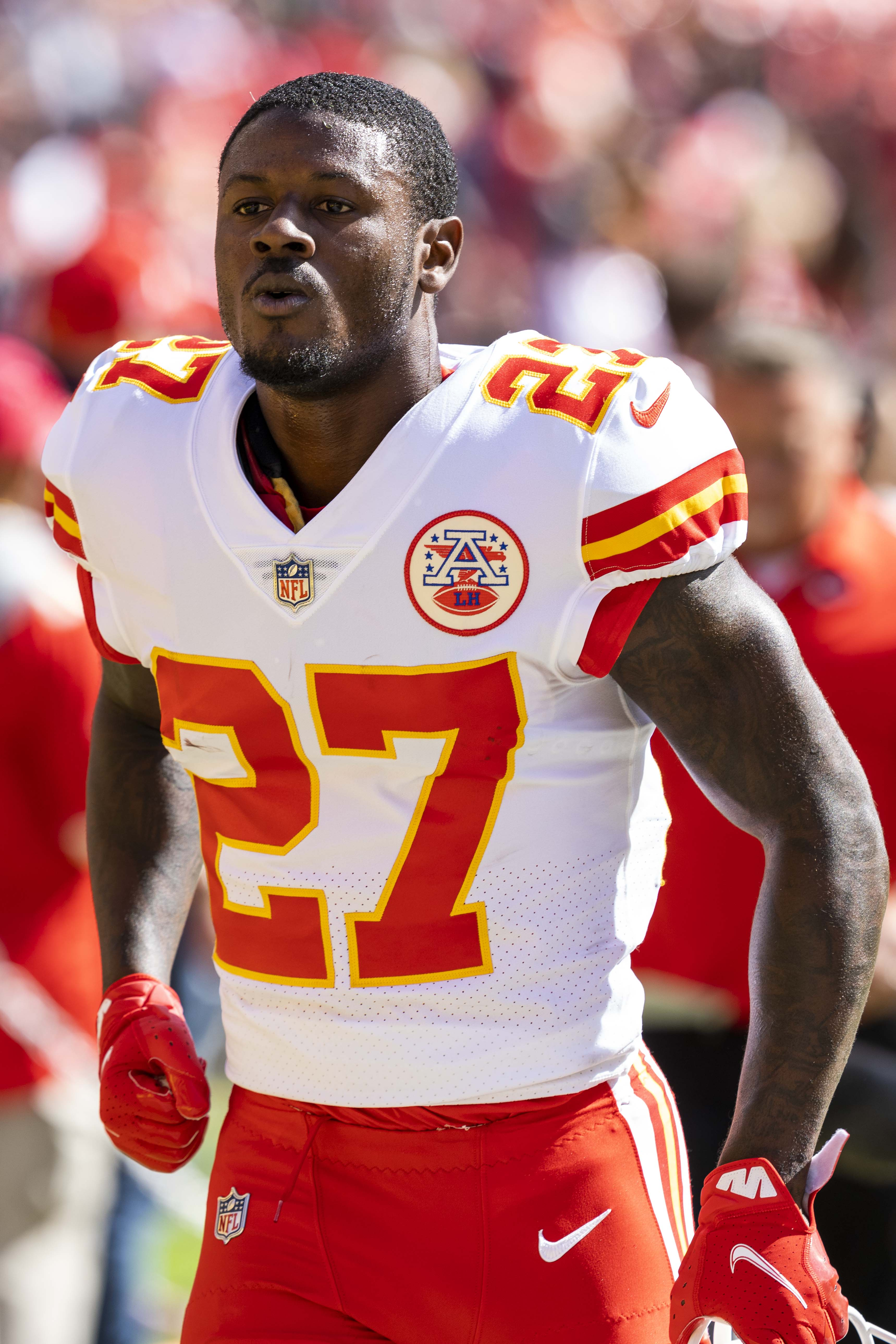
- Fenton with the Kansas City Chiefs in 2021

No. 27, 21
- Position: Cornerback

Personal information
- Born: February 17, 1997 (age 29); Miami, Florida, U.S.
- Listed height: 5 ft 11 in (1.80 m)
- Listed weight: 193 lb (88 kg)

Career information
- High school: Miami Carol City (Miami Gardens, Florida)
- College: South Carolina (2015–2018)
- NFL draft: 2019: 6th round, 201st overall pick

Career history
- Kansas City Chiefs (2019–2022); Atlanta Falcons (2022); Arizona Cardinals (2023)

Awards and highlights
- Super Bowl champion (LIV)

Career NFL statistics
- Total tackles: 127
- Forced fumbles: 2
- Pass deflections: 20
- Interceptions: 2
- Stats at Pro Football Reference

Rashad Khambrell Fenton (born February 17, 1997) is a former American professional football cornerback. He played college football at South Carolina. He was selected by the Kansas City Chiefs in the sixth round of the 2019 NFL draft.

== Early life ==
Fenton played high school football at Miami Carol City in Miami Gardens, Florida, for coach Aubrey Hill, who was coached by Steve Spurrier.

Fenton was ranked as a high end three-star recruit by major recruiting services such as ESPN, 247Sports, and Rivals and held numerous Power 5 offers. Fenton chose South Carolina Gamecocks football over Florida and Louisville.

== College career ==
Fenton played four years of college football at the University of South Carolina. Fenton was a solid cover corner who has appeared in 48 games while making 30 starts. Fenton recorded 122 tackles, five interceptions, 24 passes defended, one forced fumble along with one fumble recovery. Fenton logged a 24.8-yard career kick return average, second in school history, including one kickoff return for a touchdown.

Fenton started off his college football career for the 2015 South Carolina Gamecocks football team as a true freshman seeing limited time and returning kicks. Coach Steve Spurrier resigned mid-season as well.

For the 2016 South Carolina Gamecocks football team as a true sophomore, Fenton appeared in 12 games with seven starts for first year coach Will Muschamp. For the season Fenton logged 38 tackles, 1.5 tackles for loss, a half a sack, one forced fumble, five pass breakups, and one interception

Prior to his senior campaign the 2018 season, Fenton was named to Athlon Sports’ 2018 pre-season fourth-team All-Southeastern Conference (SEC) unit. During his senior season in 2018 he was generally considered the Gamecocks top cover corner. Fenton also split his season playing time at nickel and safety during the 2018 season while starting 12 of 13 games. Fenton recorded 34 tackles with 2.5 tackles for loss, six pass breakups, and 3 interception (tied for seventh in the SEC). In fact, Fenton had interceptions in three consecutive SEC games, picking off Georgia’s Jake Fromm, Vanderbilt’s Kyle Shurmur and Kentucky’s Terry Wilson. Fenton was nominated by his peers and received the “Unselfish Teammate Award” in 2018.

== Professional career ==
Pre-draft measurables
| Height | Weight | Arm length | Hand span | 40-yard dash | 10-yard split | 20-yard split | 20-yard shuttle | Three-cone drill | Vertical jump | Broad jump | Bench press |
|---|---|---|---|---|---|---|---|---|---|---|---|
| 5 ft 11 in (1.80 m) | 193 lb (88 kg) | 30 3/8 in (0.77 m) | 8 3/4 in (0.22 m) | 4.52 s | 1.59 s | 2.65 s | 4.25 s | 7.06 s | 34.0 in (0.86 m) | 9 ft 9 in (2.97 m) | 12 reps |

=== Kansas City Chiefs ===
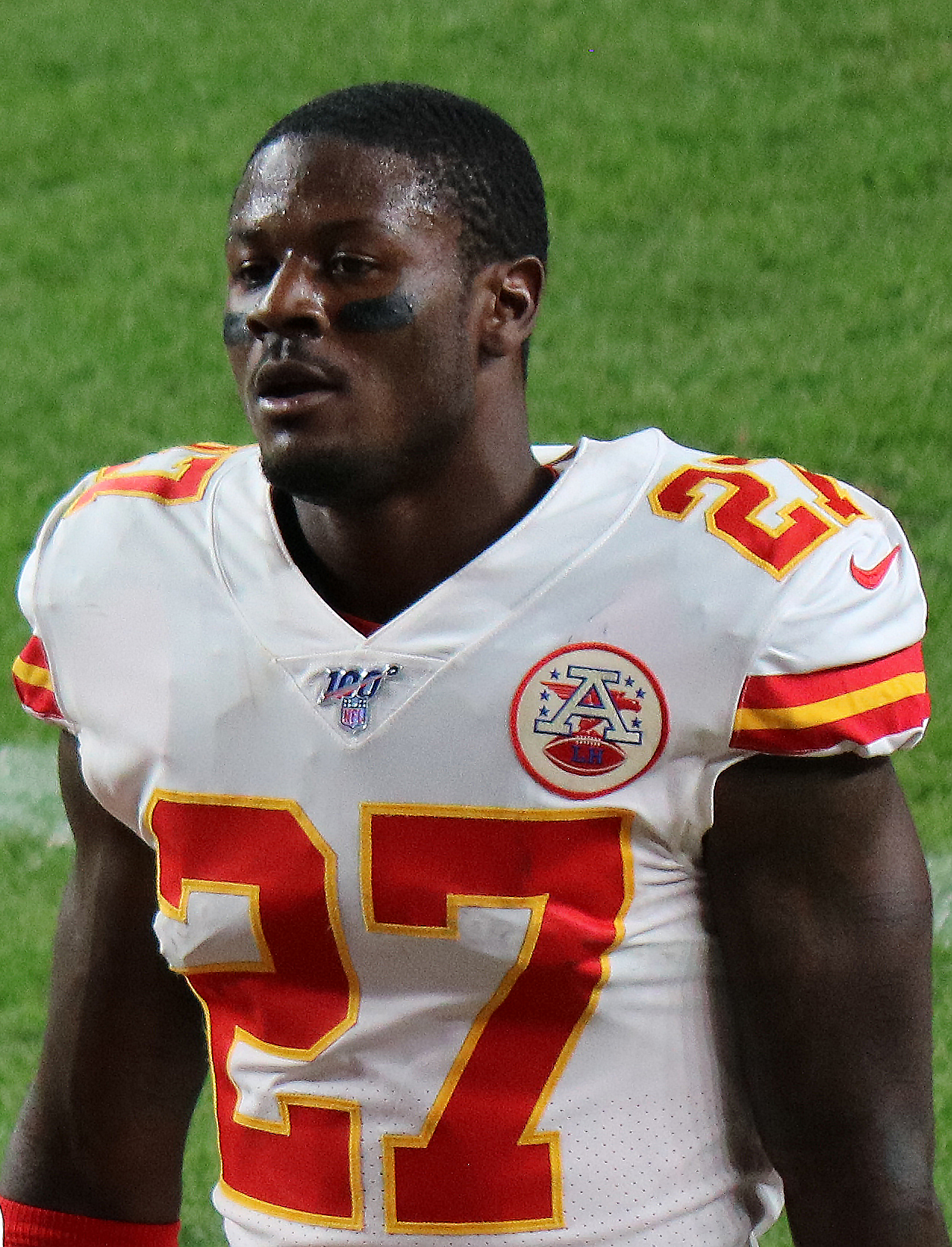
Fenton playing for the Chiefs in the 2019 season.

Fenton was selected by the Kansas City Chiefs in the sixth round with the 201st overall pick in the 2019 NFL draft. In Week 11 against the Los Angeles Chargers on Monday Night Football, Fenton recorded his first career interception off Philip Rivers in the 24–17 win. In Week 13 against the Oakland Raiders, Fenton forced a fumble during a kickoff return on Trevor Davis which was recovered by teammate Dorian O'Daniel in the 40–9 win. In the Divisional Round of the playoffs against the Houston Texans, Fenton recorded a sack on wide receiver Kenny Stills during the 51–31 win. Fenton won Super Bowl LIV with the Chiefs after they defeated the San Francisco 49ers by a score of 31–20.

Fenton appeared in all 16 regular season matchups. In Week 4 against the New England Patriots, Fenton recorded his first interception of the season during the 26–10 win. He injured both of his ankles following the Chiefs' Week 17 loss to the Los Angeles Chargers, causing him to miss the Divisional Round win over the Cleveland Browns. He returned for the 2020 AFC Championship game, where he intercepted Buffalo Bills' quarterback Josh Allen in the red zone off a deflection, and returned it 30 yards to preserve a 16-point fourth quarter lead. It was Allen's first career red zone interception in three seasons of being a starter. The Chiefs would go on to win the game to advance to Super Bowl LV where they would lose 31–9 to the Tampa Bay Buccaneers.

=== Atlanta Falcons ===
Fenton was traded to the Atlanta Falcons on November 1, 2022, in exchange for a conditional seventh-round selection in the 2023 NFL draft.

=== Arizona Cardinals ===
On March 30, 2023, Fenton signed with the Arizona Cardinals. He was placed on injured reserve on August 14, 2023.
