= Keir Thomas =

American football player (born 1998)

Profile
- Position: Outside linebacker

Personal information
- Born: January 25, 1998 (age 28); Miami, Florida, U.S.
- Listed height: 6 ft 2 in (1.88 m)
- Listed weight: 260 lb (118 kg)

Career information
- High school: Miami Central Senior (FL)
- College: South Carolina (2016–2020); Florida State (2021)
- NFL draft: 2022: undrafted

Career history
- Los Angeles Rams (2022–2026)

Awards and highlights
- Third-team All-ACC (2021)

Career NFL statistics as of 2025
- Total tackles: 13
- Stats at Pro Football Reference

Keir S. Thomas II (born January 25, 1998) is an American professional football outside linebacker. He played college football for the South Carolina Gamecocks and Florida State Seminoles.

== Early life ==
Thomas was born on January 25, 1998, in Miami, Florida. He attended Miami Central Senior High School where he played nose guard, defensive end, defensive tackle and linebacker. He was a PrepStar All-American and recorded 71 tackles and 18 sacks as a junior, while making 22 sacks and 83 tackles as a senior. Rivals.com ranked him the 49th-best player in Florida and the 23rd-best strongside defensive end nationally. He was a first-team Class 6A all-state player and was named the Miami Herald 8A-6A defensive player of the year.

== College career ==
Thomas committed to the University of South Carolina and enrolled in January 2016. As a true freshman he appeared in all 13 games and started two, while recording 24 tackles and two sacks. In 2017, as a sophomore, Thomas started 11 out of 13 games and was credited with 38 tackles and two sacks while playing defensive end as well in the interior of the defensive line. His coach described him as being "invaluable" to the team.

As a junior, Thomas played both defensive tackle and defensive end, starting 12 games making 44 tackles along with 1.5 sacks. In the 2019 fall camp, as a senior, Thomas suffered an ankle injury which resulted in an infection, keeping him out for almost the entire season. He appeared in only two games as a redshirt, recording four tackles. After the season finished, he was named one of six winners of the Dr. Harris Pastides Outstanding Student-Athlete Award.

Thomas was one of the Gamecocks' top defensive linemen in the 2020 season, recording 32 tackles along with three sacks despite battling injuries from the prior year. In January 2021, he announced his intention to transfer. He committed to Florida State shortly afterwards. In one season for Florida State, Thomas started all 12 games and made 42 tackles, including 12 for-loss, as well as 6.5 sacks and 15 quarterback hurries. He was named team captain and was selected to the All-Atlantic Coast Conference third-team.

== Professional career ==
Pre-draft measurables
Height	Weight	Arm length	Hand span	Wingspan	40-yard dash	10-yard split	20-yard split	Vertical jump	Broad jump	Bench press
6 ft 1 1/4 in (1.86 m)	255 lb (116 kg)	32 1/2 in (0.83 m)	9 5/8 in (0.24 m)	6 ft 5 1/4 in (1.96 m)	4.97 s	1.65 s	2.80 s	30.5 in (0.77 m)	9 ft 0 in (2.74 m)	19 reps
All values from Pro Day

Thomas was not invited to the NFL Combine and went unselected in the 2022 NFL draft. On May 1, 2022, he was signed by the Los Angeles Rams as an undrafted free agent. He impressed in training camp, and posted a strong performance in the final preseason game which led to him being one of three undrafted rookies to make the Rams' final roster. He made his NFL debut in week one of the regular season, appearing on one defensive snap and 11 special teams snaps in the Rams' 31–10 loss to the Buffalo Bills. He was waived on September 22, and re-signed to the practice squad two days later. He was promoted to the active roster on December 3, 2022.

On August 29, 2023, Thomas was waived by the Rams and re-signed to the practice squad. He was signed to the active roster on November 14.

Thomas was waived by the Rams on August 27, 2024, and re-signed to the practice squad. He signed a reserve/future contract with Los Angeles on January 20, 2025. He was placed on season–ending injured reserve on August 19.

On March 11, 2026, Thomas re-signed with the Rams on a one-year contract. He was placed on injured reserve on August 24 due to a groin injury suffered in the team's preseason matchup against the New Orleans Saints. He was released on October 21.
