= T. J. Brunson =

American football player (born 1997)

T.J. Brunson
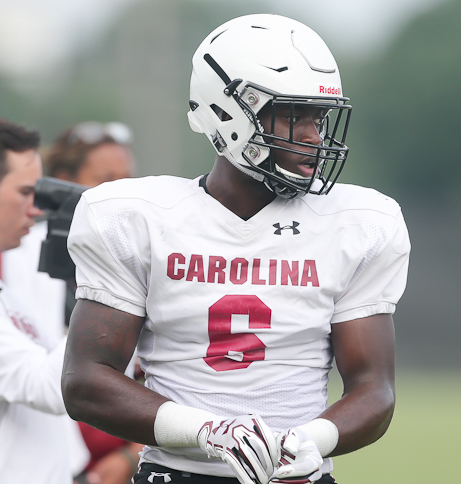
- Brunson with the South Carolina Gamecocks in 2018

No. 35, 47
- Position: Linebacker

Personal information
- Born: December 3, 1997 (age 28); Columbia, South Carolina, U.S.
- Listed height: 6 ft 1 in (1.85 m)
- Listed weight: 230 lb (104 kg)

Career information
- High school: Richland Northeast (Columbia)
- College: South Carolina (2016–2019)
- NFL draft: 2020: 7th round, 238th overall pick

Career history
- New York Giants (2020–2021); Saskatchewan Roughriders (2023)

Career NFL statistics
- Total tackles: 3
- Stats at Pro Football Reference

Tremari Jerelle Brunson (born December 3, 1997) is an American former professional football player who was a linebacker in the National Football League (NFL) and Canadian Football League (CFL). He played college football for the South Carolina Gamecocks.

== Early life ==
Brunson grew up in Columbia, South Carolina, and attended Richland Northeast High School. As a junior, he had 134 tackles and four sacks before suffering a season-ending hip injury. Going into his senior year, he committed to play college football at Louisville over offers from South Carolina, NC State, Georgia Southern, North Carolina, East Carolina, and Appalachian State. He recorded 140 tackles as a senior and helped lead Richland Northeast to the Class 3A state playoffs. He decided to flip his commitment to South Carolina at the end of the season after a recruiting push by then-new head coach Will Muschamp.

== College career ==
Brunson played four seasons with the South Carolina Gamecocks. He played mostly on special teams and occasionally as a reserve linebacker as a true freshman. Brunson was named a starter at linebacker going into his sophomore season and finished the year as South Carolina's second-leading tackler with 88 along with 4.5 tackles for loss and 2 sacks and three fumble recoveries. He was named to ESPN's All-Bowl team after making 13 tackles and his first two career sacks against Michigan in the 2018 Outback Bowl. He led the Gamecocks with 106 tackles and 10.5 tackles for loss with four sacks in his junior season. As a senior, Brunson recorded 77 tackles, six tackles for loss and five passes broken up as a senior. He finished his collegiate career with 283 tackles, six sacks, 21 tackles for loss, and six passes defensed. He graduated with a Bachelor’s in December 2019.

== Professional career ==
=== New York Giants ===
Brunson was selected by the New York Giants with the 238th overall pick in the seventh round of the 2020 NFL draft. Brunson made his NFL debut on October 22, 2020, in a 22–21 loss to the Philadelphia Eagles, making one tackle on special teams. After the first game of the 2021 preseason against the New York Jets, Brunson tore his ACL and was placed on season-ending injured reserve. On June 10, 2022, Brunson was waived.

=== Saskatchewan Roughriders ===
On May 18, 2023, it was announced that Brunson had signed a contract with the Saskatchewan Roughriders of the Canadian Football League (CFL) joining the club's training camp roster. He was released on June 1, 2024.
