= Kyle Markway =

American football player (born 1997)

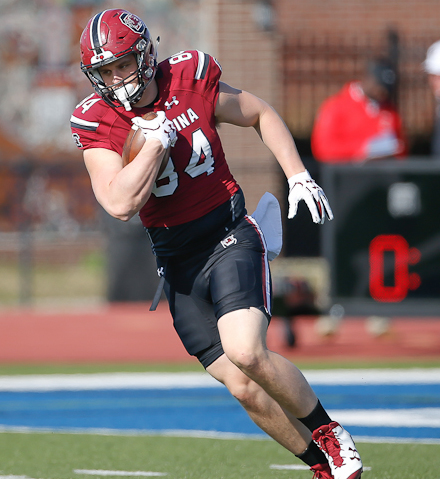
- Markway with South Carolina in 2017

No. 88
- Position: Tight end

Personal information
- Born: March 4, 1997 (age 29); St. Louis, Missouri, U.S.
- Listed height: 6 ft 4 in (1.93 m)
- Listed weight: 250 lb (113 kg)

Career information
- High school: St. John Vianney (Kirkwood, Missouri)
- College: South Carolina
- NFL draft: 2020: undrafted

Career history
- New York Giants (2020)*; Pittsburgh Steelers (2020)*; Cleveland Browns (2020); Los Angeles Rams (2021)*; Cleveland Browns (2021)*; Los Angeles Rams (2021–2022)*; Birmingham Stallions (2023)*; Michigan Panthers (2023)
- * Offseason or practice squad member only

Awards and highlights
- Super Bowl champion (LVI)
- Stats at Pro Football Reference

Kyle Markway (born March 4, 1997) is an American former professional football tight end. He played college football at South Carolina.

== Early life ==
Markway was born in 1997 in St. Louis, Missouri. His uncle Matt played college football for the University of Iowa in the 1990s. He attended high school in Kirkwood, Missouri where he played defensive end and tight end positions with the St. John Vianney Golden Griffins. During his sophomore year as a defensive end, Markway recorded 43 tackles with four sacks. His junior season saw considerable productivity including catching 28 passes, 1 touchdown, 64 tackles with 7 sacks and 18 catches. As a junior, Markway earned all-conference honors and helped the Griffins to a 7-4 season win-loss record. As a senior tight end, Markway helped the Griffins finish with a 7-5 season record. He served the Griffins as team captain and his performance earned him earned Class 5 first-team all-state honors. He was often ranked among the top 50 best players including 10th and 13th best player in the state, 31st best tight end in the country and 17th best tight end by various sports authorities including Rivals.com, Scout.com and 247Sports. Standing 6 ft 5 in (1.96 m), Markway was a two-sport athlete, playing as a forward for the Golden Griffins basketball team. Markway was a three-star recruiting prospect, receiving seven offers including Western Kentucky, Memphis, Iowa, Indiana, Illinois, Cincinnati and South Carolina.

== College career ==
After being recruited by Steve Spurrier Jr. and Joe Robinson, Markway committed to South Carolina. Beginning his true freshman season in 2015, Markway still played in all 12 games. His first and only start of the season was made against The Citadel Bulldogs. The following season in 2016, Markway sat out recovering from a foot injury. Upon his return for the 2017 season as a redshirt sophomore, Markway's tight end duties on special teams came to an abrupt halt after sustaining a rib injury. He left the season having only played in two games. Markway returned for the 2018 season during which he played in all 13 games with one start. He caught three passes and one career touchdown. Returning for his fifth season in 2019, Markway started in all 12 games in which he recorded 3 touchdown catches. His 31 receptions placed him third best on the team. Markway's performance made him a Dr. Harris Pastides Outstanding Student-Athlete Award recipient. He graduated in 2019 with a degree in sport and entertainment management.

== Professional career ==
=== New York Giants ===
After going undrafted in the 2020 NFL draft, Markway signed with the New York Giants as an undrafted free agent on April 26, 2020. He was waived by the Giants on August 11, 2020.

=== Pittsburgh Steelers ===
Markway was signed by the Pittsburgh Steelers on August 22, 2020. Markway was waived by the Steelers on September 5, 2020.

=== Cleveland Browns ===
Markway was signed to the Cleveland Browns' practice squad on September 21, 2020. He was released by the Browns on October 13, 2020, and re-signed to their practice squad on November 10, 2020. Markway was elevated to the Browns' active roster on January 16, 2021, prior to the team's divisional playoff game against the Kansas City Chiefs, and reverted to the practice squad after the game.

Markway signed a reserve/futures contract with the Browns on January 18, 2021. He was waived on May 20, 2021.

=== Los Angeles Rams ===
On July 23, 2021, Markway signed a contract with the Los Angeles Rams. He was waived on August 24, 2021.

=== Cleveland Browns (second stint) ===
On August 25, 2021, Markway was claimed off waivers by the Cleveland Browns. Markway was waived by the Browns on August 31, 2021.

=== Los Angeles Rams (second stint) ===
On December 18, 2021, Markway signed with the Los Angeles Rams practice squad. He was waived three days later.

On December 29, 2021, Markway re-signed with the Los Angeles Rams practice squad. Markway became a Super Bowl champion when the Rams won Super Bowl LVI against the Cincinnati Bengals.

On February 15, 2022, Markway signed a reserve/future contract with the Rams. He was waived with an injury designation on August 4, 2022. He cleared waivers and was placed on injured reserve the next day. He was released off injured reserve on August 8, 2022.

=== Michigan Panthers ===
On December 13, 2022, Markway signed with the Birmingham Stallions of the United States Football League (USFL), but had his playing rights traded to the Michigan Panthers three days later. He was released on October 25, 2023.
