= Zack Bailey =

American football player (born 1995)

Profile
- Position: Offensive guard

Personal information
- Born: November 8, 1995 (age 30); Summerville, South Carolina, U.S.
- Listed height: 6 ft 6 in (1.98 m)
- Listed weight: 315 lb (143 kg)

Career information
- High school: Summerville
- College: South Carolina
- NFL draft: 2019: undrafted

Career history
- Tampa Bay Buccaneers (2019–2020); Minnesota Vikings (2020–2021)*; Indianapolis Colts (2021)*; Washington Football Team / Commanders (2021–2022)*; Los Angeles Chargers (2022–2023); Atlanta Falcons (2024)*; New York Jets (2024); Minnesota Vikings (2025)*
- * Offseason or practice squad member only

Career NFL statistics as of 2024
- Games played: 2
- Stats at Pro Football Reference

Zackary Dalton Bailey (born November 8, 1995) is an American professional football offensive guard. He played college football for the South Carolina Gamecocks and was signed by the Tampa Bay Buccaneers as an undrafted free agent in 2019. He later had stints with the Minnesota Vikings, Indianapolis Colts, and Washington Football Team / Commanders.

== Early life and education ==
Bailey was born on November 8, 1995, and grew up in Summerville, South Carolina. He attended Summerville High School, where he played football for coach John McKissick, the all-time most winningest coach at any level. He played left guard and helped them reach the second round of the playoffs as a senior, being a finalist for the state "Mr. Football" award. Rivals.com ranked him a four-star prospect and the second-best player in the state, as well as the fifth-best offensive guard nationally. He had numerous scholarship offers after graduating in 2015, and decided to enroll at South Carolina.

As a true freshman in 2015, Bailey appeared in 12 games and started five, two of those at left guard and the remaining three as a center. The following year, he was South Carolina's "most consistent and highest performing offensive lineman," starting every game at left guard, several as a team captain, and being named the co-winner of the Offensive Tenacity Award (with Hayden Hurst). He changed his position from interior lineman to right tackle as a junior in 2017.

In 2017, Bailey appeared in nine games, all but one as a starter, missing four after an injury in the third match of the season (against Kentucky). He was selected to the Southeastern Conference (SEC) Fall Academic Honor Roll and was named by the league's coaches a third-team all-conference player. After contemplating whether to enter the NFL draft or return for a senior season, Bailey opted to return to the team in 2018 so he could get a degree, becoming the first member of his family to do so.

As a senior, Bailey returned to his former position of left guard and was named team captain, starting 12 games and being named second-team all-conference by the league's coaches and Associated Press (AP). He was given the Offensive Tenacity Award and was selected to the East–West Shrine All-Star game. In the regular season finale, he suffered a broken right fibula, and as a result missed the Belk Bowl. Bailey graduated in December 2018 with a degree in criminal justice, finishing his college career with 46 games played and 38 starts.

== Professional career ==
Pre-draft measurables
Height	Weight	Arm length	Hand span	40-yard dash	10-yard split	20-yard split	20-yard shuttle	Three-cone drill	Vertical jump	Broad jump	Bench press
6 ft 5 1/8 in (1.96 m)	299 lb (136 kg)	33 in (0.84 m)	9 5/8 in (0.24 m)	5.21 s	1.80 s	3.06 s	4.88 s	7.71 s	28.0 in (0.71 m)	8 ft 7 in (2.62 m)	24 reps
All values from NFL Combine/Pro Day

=== Tampa Bay Buccaneers ===
Bailey was invited to the NFL Scouting Combine, but was only able to participate in three events due to his injury. He went unselected in the 2019 NFL draft, but afterwards was signed as an undrafted free agent by the Tampa Bay Buccaneers. He was the only undrafted rookie to make the final roster, but suffered an injury shortly afterwards and was placed on injured reserve. At the final roster cuts in 2020, Bailey was released, but afterwards re-signed to the practice squad. He was released from the practice squad on November 3.

=== Minnesota Vikings (first stint) ===
While a free agent, Bailey received tryouts from the Baltimore Ravens, New England Patriots, and Minnesota Vikings. He was signed to the Vikings' practice squad on December 8. Bailey was signed to a futures contract in January 2021. He was waived at the final roster cuts in 2021, but was subsequently re-signed to the practice squad. He was released from the Vikings' practice squad on October 13, 2021.

=== Indianapolis Colts ===
Two days after being released by the Vikings, Bailey was signed to the practice squad of the Indianapolis Colts. He was then released on October 26. He received a tryout from the Houston Texans after being released by the Colts.

=== Washington Football Team / Washington Commanders ===
On November 2, 2021, Bailey was signed by the Washington Football Team to the practice squad. He was placed on the COVID-19 reserve list on December 23, and activated one week later. Bailey received a reserve/future contract with the team on January 15, 2022. Bailey was released by Washington on May 16.

=== Los Angeles Chargers ===
On May 17, 2022, Bailey was claimed off waivers by the Los Angeles Chargers. He was waived at the final roster cuts in August, but was afterwards brought back on the practice squad. He received an elevation to the active roster for the Chargers' Week 13 game against the Las Vegas Raiders, and made his NFL debut in the loss, appearing on four special teams snaps. He signed a reserve/future contract on January 17, 2023.

On August 29, 2023, Bailey was waived by the Chargers and re-signed to the practice squad. He was promoted to the active roster on September 23. He was placed on injured reserve on December 9.

=== Atlanta Falcons ===
On July 24, 2024, Bailey was signed by the Atlanta Falcons. He was waived on August 25.

=== New York Jets ===
On November 5, 2024, Bailey was signed to the New York Jets practice squad. He signed a reserve/future contract with New York on January 6, 2025. On June 12, Bailey was waived by the Jets.

=== Minnesota Vikings (second stint) ===
On August 19, 2025, Bailey signed with the Minnesota Vikings. However, Bailey was waived by Minnesota during roster cuts on August 24.
