= Travaris Robinson =

American football player and coach (born 1981)

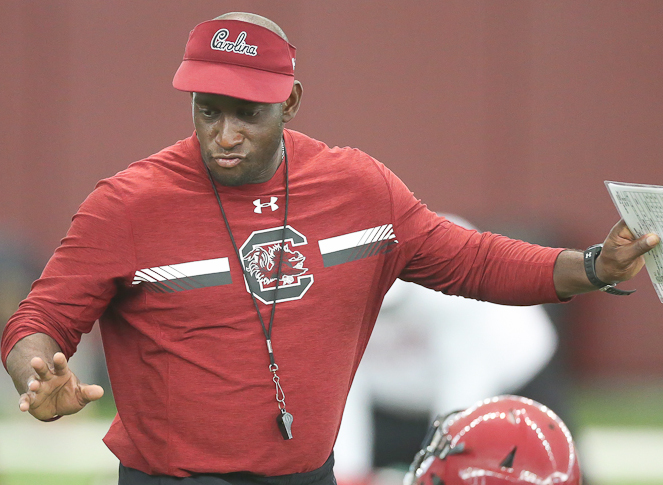
- Robinson with South Carolina in 2018

Georgia Bulldogs
- Title: Co-defensive coordinator/safeties coach

Personal information
- Born: September 21, 1981 (age 45); Miami, Florida, U.S.
- Listed height: 5 ft 10 in (1.78 m)
- Listed weight: 193 lb (88 kg)

Career information
- High school: Miami Coral Park (Miami, Florida)
- College: Auburn
- NFL draft: 2003: undrafted

Career history

Playing
- Atlanta Falcons (2003); Tampa Bay Buccaneers (2003); Atlanta Falcons (2004)

Coaching
- Auburn (2006–2007) Graduate assistant; Western Kentucky (2008) Defensive backs coach; Southern Miss (2009) Cornerbacks coach; Texas Tech (2010) Defensive backs coach; Florida (2011–2014) Defensive backs coach; Auburn (2015) Defensive backs coach; South Carolina (2016–2020) Defensive coordinator & defensive backs coach; Miami (FL) (2021) Defensive backs coach; Alabama (2022–2023) Cornerbacks coach; Georgia (2024–present) Co-defensive coordinator/safeties coach

Awards and highlights
- First-team All-SEC (2002)

Career NFL statistics
- Interceptions: 1
- Passes defended: 2
- Forced fumbles: 1
- Tackles: 12
- Stats at Pro Football Reference

Travaris Jerod Robinson (born September 21, 1981) is an American football coach and former safety who is the co-defensive coordinator and safeties coach at the University of Georgia. Prior to that, he was the cornerbacks coach at the University of Alabama and the defensive backs coach at the University of Miami. He played college football at Auburn. Thereafter, he played professionally for the Atlanta Falcons and the Tampa Bay Buccaneers of the NFL.

== Early life ==
Robinson was born in Miami, Florida. At Coral Park High School in Miami, he played football for four years and earned all-state honors as a defensive back and wide receiver.

== College career ==
At Auburn University, Robinson played for the Auburn Tigers under head coach Tommy Tuberville from 1999 to 2002. As a freshman in 1999, Robinson was a wide receiver and kick returner, with 18 receptions for 174 yards and a touchdown and a team-leading 316 kick return yards.

Robinson moved from wide receiver to defensive back in 2000 while remaining at kick returner. Playing in all 13 games, Robinson had 30 tackles, 10 kickoff returns for 164 yards, two passes deflected, and one interception in a season where Auburn won the Southeastern Conference (SEC) West Division.

In 2001, Robinson played in 11 games on special teams and at cornerback, totaling 27 tackles and three pass deflections. For the second straight year, Robinson was on an Auburn team that won at least a share of the SEC West.

As a senior in 2002, Robinson was a starting free safety and had 92 total tackles, the second most on the team, and four interceptions. Robinson made the all-SEC first team in 2002.

Robinson graduated from Auburn in 2007 with a bachelor's degree in mass communications.

== Professional career ==
Following the 2003 NFL draft, Robinson signed with the Atlanta Falcons as an undrafted free agent. As a rookie with the Falcons, Robinson played in five games with one start, making 10 tackles, one pass defended, and one forced fumble.

The Falcons waived Robinson on October 8, 2003, after which the Tampa Bay Buccaneers immediately signed him off waivers. With the Buccaneers, Robinson played in four games with one start, making four tackles, one interception, and one pass defended. Robinson returned to the Falcons on July 30, 2004 after being waived by the Buccaneers. Prior to the regular season, the Falcons waived Robinson on August 31, 2004.

== Coaching career ==
=== Early coaching career ===
Robinson began his coaching career in 2006 at Auburn under head coach Tommy Tuberville and defensive coordinator Will Muschamp as a defensive graduate assistant and staff assistant. He helped Auburn win back-to-back bowl games, the 2007 Cotton Bowl Classic following the 2006 season and 2007 Chick-fil-A Bowl following the 2007 season.

After two seasons at Auburn, Robinson took his first full-time position with Western Kentucky for one season before becoming cornerbacks coach at Southern Miss in 2009. His former college head coach, Tommy Tuberville, hired Robinson to serve as defensive backs coach at Texas Tech in 2010.

=== Florida ===
On January 2, 2011, the Florida Gators' new head coach, Will Muschamp, announced the hiring of Robinson as the Gators' defensive backs coach. During that time period, Florida played in two bowl games, including a win in the 2011 TicketCity Bowl.

=== Auburn (second stint) ===
On January 3, 2015, Robinson returned to Auburn, this time as cornerbacks coach.

=== South Carolina ===
On December 6, 2015, Robinson was hired as defensive coordinator at South Carolina, following Muschamp's appointment as head coach. The 2017 South Carolina team won the Outback Bowl. However, a lack of subsequent success led South Carolina to fire Muschamp in November 2020 seven games into the season. On December 6, 2020, exactly 5 years after his hiring at UofSC, it was reported that new head coach Shane Beamer will not retain Robinson for the 2021 season.

Robinson played a role in the development of several now-NFL defensive backs, including 2021 first round pick Jaycee Horn.

=== Miami ===
On January 9, 2021, he was hired as the defensive backs coach at the University of Miami.

=== Alabama ===
On January 19, 2022, rumors began to surface that Robinson was taking a position on Nick Saban’s staff at the University of Alabama. On January 21, 2022, Robinson confirmed joining the Alabama staff as DB coach on his Twitter account.

=== Georgia ===
On January 13, 2024, Robinson was named the co-defensive coordinator and safeties coach at the University of Georgia.
