= Ty'Son Williams =

American football player (born 1996)

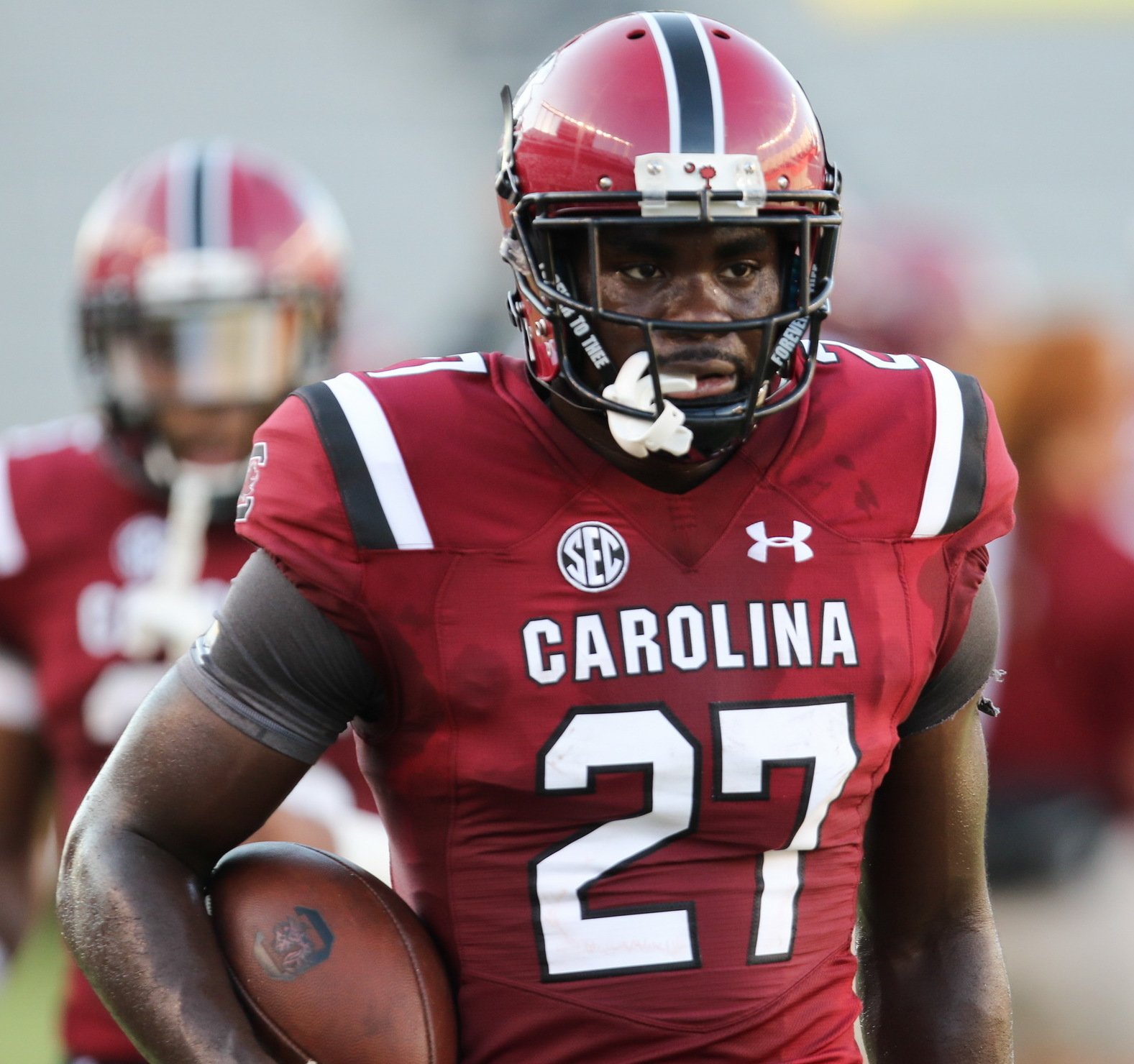
- Williams with South Carolina in 2016

Profile
- Position: Running back

Personal information
- Born: September 4, 1996 (age 30); Macon, Georgia, U.S.
- Listed height: 6 ft 0 in (1.83 m)
- Listed weight: 220 lb (100 kg)

Career information
- High school: Crestwood (Sumter, South Carolina)
- College: North Carolina (2015); South Carolina (2016–2018); BYU (2019)
- NFL draft: 2020: undrafted

Career history
- Baltimore Ravens (2020–2021); Indianapolis Colts (2022)*; Arizona Cardinals (2022)
- * Offseason or practice squad member only

Career NFL statistics
- Rushing yards: 185
- Rushing average: 5.3
- Rushing touchdowns: 1
- Receptions: 9
- Receiving yards: 84
- Stats at Pro Football Reference

Ty'Son Williams (born September 4, 1996) is an American former professional football player who was a running back in the National Football League (NFL). He played college football for the North Carolina Tar Heels, South Carolina Gamecocks and BYU Cougars. He went undrafted in the 2020 NFL draft, and spent two seasons in the league, one with the Baltimore Ravens and one with the Arizona Cardinals.

== College career ==
Regarded as a four-star recruit out of Crestwood High School, Williams signed with North Carolina. He transferred to South Carolina after one year. In two seasons with the Gamecocks, Williams rushed for 799 yards. He entered the transfer portal as a graduate and came to BYU over offers from Fresno State and Marshall. In his first game against Utah, he was named the starting running back and had seven carries for 6.4 yards per carry. The following week, he rushed for 94 yards and was pushed across the goal line by the Cougar offensive line for the game-winning touchdown in a 29–26 double overtime win over Tennessee. Williams played in four games before tearing his ACL against Washington. He tallied 49 carries for 264 yards, an average of 5.4 yards per carry, and three touchdowns in addition to seven receptions for 47 yards.

== Professional career ==
Pre-draft measurables
Height	Weight
5 ft 10 3/4 in (1.80 m)	220 lb (100 kg)
Values from Pro Day

=== Baltimore Ravens ===
The Baltimore Ravens signed Williams on August 28, 2020. He was waived on September 5, 2020, and re-signed to the practice squad the next day. He was elevated to the active roster on December 2 for the team's week 12 game against the Pittsburgh Steelers, and reverted to the practice squad after the game. On January 18, 2021, Williams signed a reserve/futures contract with the Ravens. Originally set to be third on the depth chart, season-ending injuries to J. K. Dobbins, Justice Hill, and Gus Edwards set him up to start in the season opener against the Las Vegas Raiders. In the game, he had nine carries for 65 yards, including 35 yard run for his first professional touchdown, along with three receptions for 29 yards. However, the Ravens lost in overtime 27–33. Williams quickly fell out of favor with the Ravens over the next few weeks and lost his starting role to Latavius Murray.

On March 9, 2022, the Ravens placed an exclusive-rights free agent tender on Williams. However, the Ravens withdrew the tender on May 10, making him a free agent.

=== Indianapolis Colts ===
On May 24, 2022, Williams signed with the Indianapolis Colts. He was waived on August 30, 2022.

=== Arizona Cardinals ===
On October 12, 2022, Williams was signed to the Arizona Cardinals practice squad. He was signed to the active roster on January 7, 2023. On August 29, 2023, Williams was released by the Cardinals as part of final roster cuts before the start of the 2023 season.
