= Kobe Smith =

American football player (born 1998)

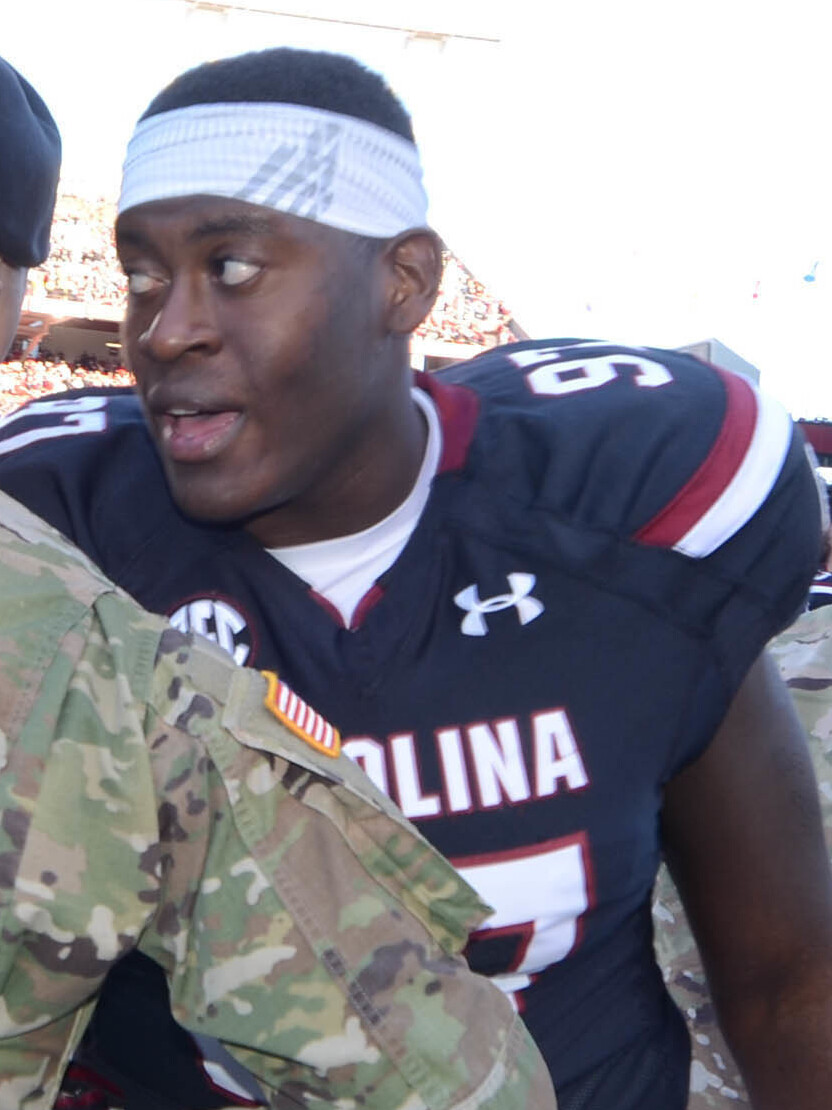
- Smith with South Carolina in 2016

No. 96
- Position: Defensive end

Personal information
- Born: June 23, 1998 (age 28); Lawrenceville, Georgia, U.S.
- Listed height: 6 ft 2 in (1.88 m)
- Listed weight: 312 lb (142 kg)

Career information
- High school: Archer (Lawrenceville)
- College: South Carolina (2016–2019)
- NFL draft: 2020: undrafted

Career history
- Tennessee Titans (2020)*; Tampa Bay Buccaneers (2020–2021); Philadelphia Eagles (2022)*; Atlanta Falcons (2022)*; San Antonio Brahmas (2023); New York Giants (2023)*; St. Louis Battlehawks (2024)
- * Offseason or practice squad member only

Awards and highlights
- Super Bowl champion (LV)
- Stats at Pro Football Reference

Kobe A. Smith (born June 23, 1998) is an American former professional football player who was a defensive end. He played college football for the South Carolina Gamecocks and was signed by the Tennessee Titans of the National Football League (NFL) as an undrafted free agent in 2020.

== Professional career ==
Pre-draft measurables
Height	Weight	Arm length	Hand span
6 ft 2 1/8 in (1.88 m)	312 lb (142 kg)	32 3/4 in (0.83 m)	9 7/8 in (0.25 m)
All values from Pro Day

=== Tennessee Titans ===
After going unselected in the 2020 NFL draft, Smith was signed by the Tennessee Titans as an undrafted free agent on May 7, 2020. He was waived on September 5, 2020, and re-signed to the practice squad. He was released on September 21.

=== Tampa Bay Buccaneers ===
On October 20, 2020, Smith was signed to the Tampa Bay Buccaneers practice squad. He signed a reserve/future contract on February 9, 2021. He was waived on August 31, 2021, and re-signed to the practice squad. He signed a reserve/future contract on January 24, 2022. He was waived on May 16, 2022.

=== Philadelphia Eagles ===
On July 26, 2022, Smith signed with the Philadelphia Eagles. He was waived/injured on August 30, 2022, and placed on injured reserve. He was released on September 8.

=== Atlanta Falcons ===
On October 10, 2022, Smith was signed to the Atlanta Falcons practice squad.

=== San Antonio Brahmas ===
Smith was placed on the reserve list by the San Antonio Brahmas of the XFL on March 29, 2023. He was released from his contract on June 14, 2023.

=== New York Giants ===
On June 15, 2023, Smith signed with the New York Giants. He was released on August 29, 2023.

=== St. Louis Battlehawks ===
On January 19, 2024, Smith signed with the St. Louis Battlehawks of the United Football League (UFL). He re-signed with the team on September 24, 2024. He retired on March 1, 2025.
