= Sadarius Hutcherson =

American football player (born 1998)

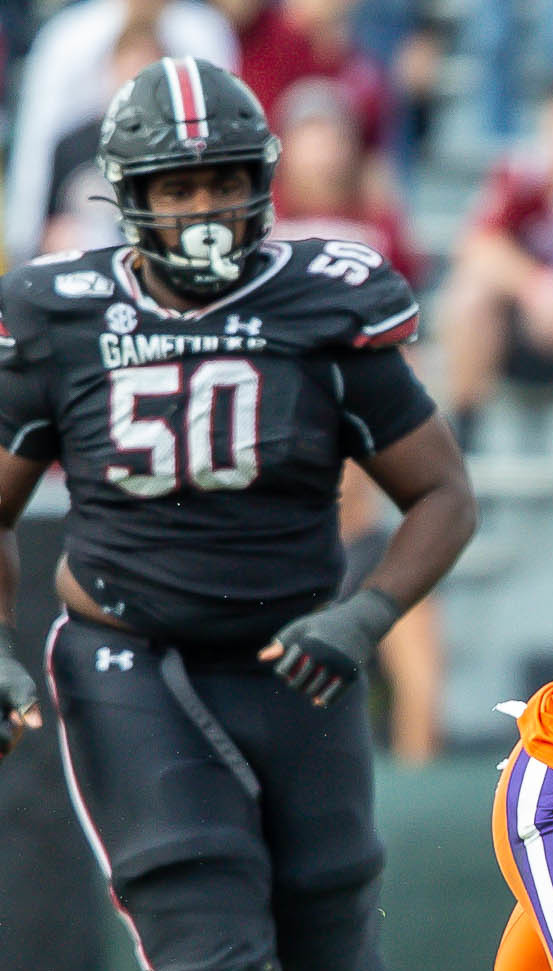
- Hutcherson with South Carolina in 2019

No. 50
- Position: Guard

Personal information
- Born: April 22, 1998 (age 28); Huntingdon, Tennessee, U.S.
- Listed height: 6 ft 4 in (1.93 m)
- Listed weight: 315 lb (143 kg)

Career information
- High school: Huntingdon (Huntingdon, Tennessee)
- College: South Carolina
- NFL draft: 2021: undrafted

Career history
- Tampa Bay Buccaneers (2021); Memphis Showboats (2023); DC Defenders (2024)*; Saskatchewan Roughriders (2024)*
- * Offseason or practice squad member only

Awards and highlights
- Second-team All-SEC (2020)
- Stats at Pro Football Reference

Sadarius Martese Hutcherson (born April 22, 1998) is an American former professional football guard. He played college football at South Carolina.

== Early life ==
Hutcherson grew up in Huntingdon, Tennessee, and attended Huntingdon High School. There he played on both the offensive and defensive lines as well as at tight end. He also played basketball. He was considered a three-star defensive end prospect by 247 Sports coming out of high school.

== College career ==
Hutcherson committed to play at the University of South Carolina on February 3, 2016. Arizona State, Louisville, Memphis, and Middle Tennessee State also offered to Hutcherson. He transitioned into a full time offensive linemen. He was redshirted as a true freshman and played on the scout team but did not see game action.

He entered his second collegiate season as a reserve on the offensive line. He saw his first ever snaps against Louisiana Tech at left guard in relief of Cory Helms. Overall he appeared in ten games, starting four of them.

As a redshirt sophomore Hutcherson was able to start every game. Twelve of them at right guard and one on the left side of the line.

In the 2019 season he again started every game, eleven at left tackle and one at left guard. He was named to the SEC Fall Academic Honor Roll.

In his final season Hutcherson was named a team captain. He started all ten of his team's games at left tackle. Pro Football Focus named Hutcherson to their second-team All-SEC. He ended his college career having appeared in forty-five total games. Following the season, Hutcherson plated in the NFLPA Collegiate Bowl.

== Professional career ==
=== Pre-draft ===
Hutcherson earned an invite to the NFL Scouting Combing, one of fifty-six offensive linemen invited. However, no combine took place due to the COVID-19 pandemic. Hutcherson was viewed as a developmental prospect on the offensive line by many. His experience at multiple positions and versatility was projected to help him secure his spot on an NFL roster.

Pre-draft measurables
| Height | Weight | Arm length | Hand span | 40-yard dash | 10-yard split | 20-yard split | Vertical jump | Broad jump | Bench press |
|---|---|---|---|---|---|---|---|---|---|
| 6 ft 3 3/8 in (1.91 m) | 321 lb (146 kg) | 32 3/8 in (0.82 m) | 9 in (0.23 m) | 4.95 s | 1.75 s | 2.90 s | 31.5 in (0.80 m) | 8 ft 10 in (2.69 m) | 36 reps |
All values from South Carolina Pro Day

=== Tampa Bay Buccaneers ===
Hutcherson went undrafted in the 2021 NFL draft. Following the draft, Hutcherson and the Tampa Bay Buccaneers agreed to a three-year $2,455,000 deal with $130,000 guaranteed. In the team's first preseason game against the Cincinnati Bengals, Hutcherson suffered a torn ACL. He was subsequently placed on season-ending injured reserve.

On August 30, 2022, Hutcherson was waived by the Buccaneers.

=== Memphis Showboats ===
On February 15, 2023, Hutcherson signed with the Memphis Showboats of the United States Football League (USFL). He was transferred to the team's inactive list on March 19, 2023. He was released on October 12, 2023.

=== DC Defenders ===
On January 23, 2024, Hutcherson signed with the DC Defenders of the United Football League (UFL). He was removed from the team's roster on March 21, 2024.

=== Saskatchewan Roughriders ===
On April 3, 2024, Hutcherson signed with the Saskatchewan Roughriders of the Canadian Football League (CFL). He was placed on the reserve/suspended list on May 12, 2024. He was released on February 11, 2025.
