= Joseph Charlton =

American football player (born 1997)

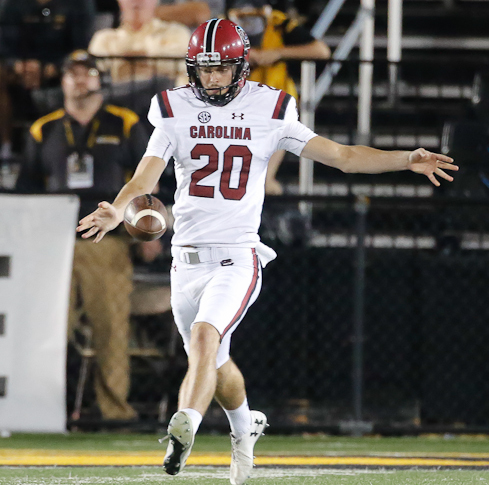
- Charlton with the South Carolina Gamecocks in 2017

No. 3, 19
- Position: Punter

Personal information
- Born: April 7, 1997 (age 29); Columbia, South Carolina, U.S.
- Listed height: 6 ft 5 in (1.96 m)
- Listed weight: 190 lb (86 kg)

Career information
- High school: A.C. Flora (Columbia)
- College: South Carolina (2015–2019)
- NFL draft: 2020: undrafted

Career history
- Carolina Panthers (2020–2021); Kansas City Chiefs (2021)*; Jacksonville Jaguars (2021); Cleveland Browns (2022–2023)*
- * Offseason or practice squad member only

Awards and highlights
- Second-team All-SEC (2018)

Career NFL statistics
- Punts: 69
- Punting yards: 3,055
- Average punt: 45.4
- Inside 20: 29
- Stats at Pro Football Reference

Joseph Charlton (born April 7, 1997) is an American former professional football player who was a punter in the National Football League (NFL). He played college football for the South Carolina Gamecocks.

== College career ==
Charlton was a member of the South Carolina Gamecocks for five seasons, redshirting as a true freshman. He was named South Carolina's starting punter going into his redshirt sophomore year. As a redshirt junior, Charlton set a new school record by averaging 44.8 yards per punt and was named second-team All-Southeastern Conference (SEC) by the league's coaches. He broke his own record in his senior season by averaging 47.7 yards per punt and was named second-team All-SEC and was an honorable mention All-American by Pro Football Focus. Charlton finished his collegiate career averaging 45.5 yards per punt, a school record.

== Professional career ==
Pre-draft measurables
Height	Weight	Arm length	Hand span
6 ft 4 1/2 in (1.94 m)	195 lb (88 kg)	32 3/8 in (0.82 m)	8 1/2 in (0.22 m)
All values from NFL Combine

=== Carolina Panthers ===
Charlton was signed by the Carolina Panthers as an undrafted free agent on July 22, 2020. Charlton was named the Panthers punter at the end of the preseason, beating out Kaare Vedvik. Charlton made his NFL debut on September 13, 2020, in the season opener against the Las Vegas Raiders, punting twice for 120 yards (60.0 average). In Week 9, against the Kansas City Chiefs, he completed a 29-yard pass to Brandon Zylstra on a trick play. In Week 16, Charlton punted five times all inside the 20-yard-line, including a long of 67 yards in a 20–13 win over the Washington Football Team, earning National Football Conference Special Teams Player of the Week. He was placed on injured reserve on October 14, 2021. He was released on November 16, 2021.

=== Kansas City Chiefs ===
On December 24, 2021, Charlton was signed to the practice squad of the Kansas City Chiefs, but was released three days later.

=== Jacksonville Jaguars ===
On December 28, 2021, Charlton was signed to the Jacksonville Jaguars practice squad.

=== Cleveland Browns ===
Charlton signed a reserve/futures contract with the Cleveland Browns on February 1, 2022. He was waived on August 22, 2022. On May 1, 2023, Charlton re-signed with the Browns. He was waived on August 4, 2023.
