= D. J. Wonnum =

American football player (born 1997)

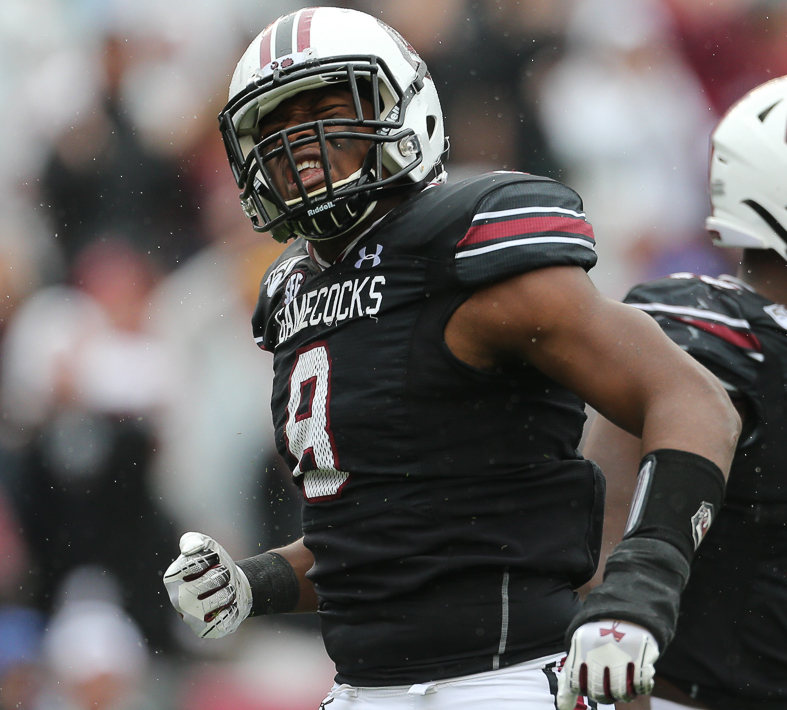
- Wonnum with the South Carolina Gamecocks in 2019

No. 98 – Detroit Lions
- Position: Defensive end
- Roster status: Active

Personal information
- Born: October 31, 1997 (age 29); Stone Mountain, Georgia, U.S.
- Listed height: 6 ft 5 in (1.96 m)
- Listed weight: 258 lb (117 kg)

Career information
- High school: Stephenson (Stone Mountain)
- College: South Carolina (2016–2019)
- NFL draft: 2020: 4th round, 117th overall pick

Career history
- Minnesota Vikings (2020–2023); Carolina Panthers (2024–2025); Detroit Lions (2026–present)

Awards and highlights
- Second-team All-SEC (2019)

Career NFL statistics as of Week 10, 2026
- Total tackles: 269
- Sacks: 36.0
- Forced fumbles: 3
- Fumble recoveries: 3
- Pass deflections: 16
- Interceptions: 1
- Defensive touchdowns: 1
- Stats at Pro Football Reference

Dennis O. "D. J." Wonnum Jr (born October 31, 1997) is an American professional football defensive end for the Detroit Lions of the National Football League (NFL). He played college football for the South Carolina Gamecocks. Wonnum was selected by the Minnesota Vikings in the fourth round of the 2020 NFL draft.

== Early life ==
Wonnum grew up in Stone Mountain, Georgia, and attended Stephenson High School. As a senior, he was named All-Region after recording 38 tackles with 11 tackles for loss and 2.5 sacks. Wonnum initially committed to play college football at Iowa State before de-committing after a coaching change. He subsequently committed to attend Indiana before de-committing a second time and signing to play at South Carolina.

== College career ==
Wonnum played in all of South Carolina's games as a true freshman, recording 32 tackles including 3.5 tackles for loss and 1.5 sacks. Wonnum was named a permanent team captain going into his sophomore year and finished the season with 57 tackles and led the team with 13.0 tackles for loss and 6.0 sacks. He injured his ankle during the Gamecocks' season opener as a junior, and only played in five games. He compiled 11 tackles, 3.5 tackles for loss and two sacks during the injury-shortened season. As a senior, Wonnum recorded 37 tackles with 9.5 tackles for loss and 4.5 sacks with three quarterback hurries, a forced fumble, one blocked kick, and an interception and was named second-team All-Southeastern Conference.

== Professional career ==
Pre-draft measurables
Height	Weight	Arm length	Hand span	Wingspan	40-yard dash	10-yard split	20-yard split	20-yard shuttle	Three-cone drill	Vertical jump	Broad jump	Bench press
6 ft 4 5/8 in (1.95 m)	258 lb (117 kg)	34 1/8 in (0.87 m)	10 1/2 in (0.27 m)	6 ft 11 3/4 in (2.13 m)	4.73 s	1.70 s	2.77 s	4.44 s	7.25 s	34.5 in (0.88 m)	10 ft 3 in (3.12 m)	20 reps
All values from NFL Combine

=== Minnesota Vikings ===
Wonnum was selected by the Minnesota Vikings with the 117th overall pick in the fourth round of the 2020 NFL draft.

In Week 4 against the Houston Texans, Wonnum recorded his first career sack on Deshaun Watson during the 31–23 win. In Week 8 against the Green Bay Packers, Wonnum recorded a strip sack on Aaron Rodgers which was recovered by teammate Eric Wilson late in the fourth quarter to secure a 28–22 Vikings' win. In Week 10 against the Chicago Bears on Monday Night Football, Wonnum recorded a sack on Nick Foles during the 19–13 win.

On December 27, 2023, Wonnum was placed on the injured reserve list after suffering a season-ending torn quadriceps in a week 16 game against the Detroit Lions the previous Sunday.

=== Carolina Panthers ===
On March 14, 2024, Wonnum signed a two-year deal with the Carolina Panthers. He was placed on the reserve/PUP list to start the season. He was activated on November 9.

In 2025, Wonnum played in 16 games with 15 starts, recording 42 tackles, three sacks, three passes defensed, and one interception.

=== Detroit Lions ===
On March 17, 2026, Wonnum signed a one-year contract worth up to $6 million with the Detroit Lions.

Wonnum recorded his first Detroit sack against New York Jets quarterback Geno Smith. In Week 7 against the Green Bay Packers, Wonnum deflected a go-ahead field goal attempt from Trey Smack, allowing the Lions to eke out a 20-17 win and was named NFC Special Teams Player of the Week for his performance.

== NFL career statistics ==
Legend
	Led the league
**Bold**	Career high

=== Regular season ===
Year	Team	Games		Tackles					Interceptions						Fumbles				
Year	Team	GP	GS	Cmb	Solo	Ast	Sck	TFL	Int	Yds	Avg	Lng	TD	PD	FF	Fmb	FR	Yds	TD
2020	MIN	14	2	24	16	8	3.0	5	0	0	0.0	0	0	1	**1**	0	0	0	0
2021	MIN	17	14	47	29	18	**8.0**	**7**	0	0	0.0	0	0	4	**1**	0	0	0	0
2022	MIN	16	1	38	27	11	4.0	5	0	0	0.0	0	0	0	0	0	0	0	0
2023	MIN	15	14	**62**	**33**	**29**	**8.0**	**7**	0	0	0.0	0	0	**6**	0	0	**1**	**51**	**1**
2024	CAR	8	8	37	18	19	4.0	4	0	0	0.0	0	0	1	**1**	0	0	0	0
2025	CAR	16	15	42	19	23	3.0	4	**1**	0	0.0	0	0	3	0	0	**1**	19	0
2026	DET	8	3	19	11	8	6.0	6	0	0	0.0	0	0	1	0	0	**1**	0	0
Career		94	57	269	153	116	36.0	38	1	0	0.0	0	0	16	3	0	3	70	1

=== Postseason ===
Year	Team	Games		Tackles					Interceptions						Fumbles				
Year	Team	GP	GS	Cmb	Solo	Ast	Sck	TFL	Int	Yds	Avg	Lng	TD	PD	FF	Fmb	FR	Yds	TD
2022	MIN	1	0	2	1	1	0.0	0	0	0	0.0	0	0	0	0	0	0	0	0
2025	CAR	1	1	**5**	**2**	**3**	0.0	0	0	0	0.0	0	0	**2**	0	0	0	0	0
Career		2	1	7	3	4	0.0	0	0	0	0.0	0	0	2	0	0	0	0	0

== Personal life ==
Wonnum's younger brother, Dylan, was a starting offensive lineman at South Carolina.
