= Shi Smith =

American football player (born 1998)

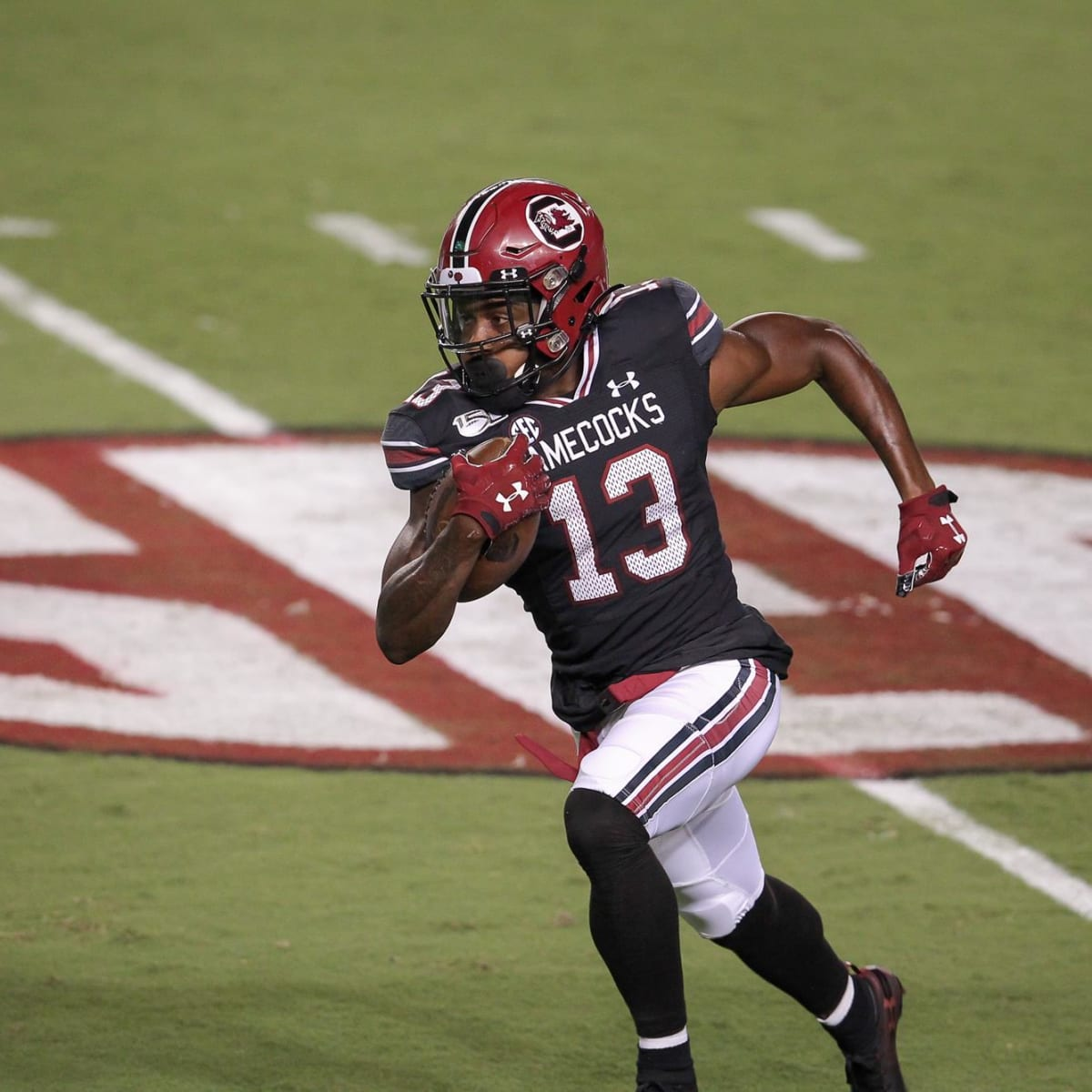
- Smith with the South Carolina Gamecocks

No. 12, 13
- Position: Wide receiver

Personal information
- Born: October 26, 1998 (age 28); Union, South Carolina, U.S.
- Listed height: 5 ft 10 in (1.78 m)
- Listed weight: 190 lb (86 kg)

Career information
- High school: Union County
- College: South Carolina (2017–2020)
- NFL draft: 2021: 6th round, 204th overall pick

Career history
- Carolina Panthers (2021–2022); Tennessee Titans (2023)*; Kansas City Chiefs (2024)*; Birmingham Stallions (2025)*
- * Offseason or practice squad member only

Career NFL statistics
- Receptions: 28
- Receiving yards: 400
- Receiving touchdowns: 2
- Return yards: 167
- Stats at Pro Football Reference

Shiyun M. Smith (born October 26, 1998) is an American former professional football player who was a wide receiver and punt returner in the National Football League (NFL). He played college football for the South Carolina Gamecocks.

== Early life ==
Smith attended Union County High School in Union County, South Carolina. He caught 54 passes for 1,337 yards and 17 touchdowns as a junior and 67 passes for 907 yards and 10 touchdowns as a senior. He committed to the University of South Carolina to play college football as a 4 star recruit.

College recruiting
Name	Hometown	School	Height	Weight	Commit date
Shi Smith; WR	Union, SC	Union	6 ft 0 in (1.83 m)	175 lb (79 kg)	Jun 11, 2016
Shi Smith; WR	Recruit ratings: Rivals: 247Sports: ESPN:				
Overall recruit ranking: Scout: (67 WR) Rivals: 205 (34 WR) 247Sports: 159 (4 ATH) ESPN: 107 (16 WR)
Note: In many cases, Scout, Rivals, 247Sports, On3, and ESPN may conflict in their listings of height and weight.; In these cases, the average was taken. ESPN grades are on a 100-point scale.; Sources: "2017 Team Ranking". Rivals.com.

== College career ==
As a true freshman at South Carolina in 2017, Smith played in 12 games with seven starts and had 29 receptions for 409 yards and three touchdowns. He again started nine of 12 games in 2018, recording 45 receptions for 673 yards and four touchdowns. As a junior in 2019, he started all 10 games he played in missing two due to injury. He finished the season with 43 receptions for 489 yards and two touchdowns. Smith became South Carolina's primary receiving target his senior season in 2020. Smith finished his senior season in 2020 with 57 receptions for 633 yards and 4 touchdowns over the course of 9 games.

Following the conclusion of the 2020 season, Smith announced he was declaring for the 2021 NFL draft.

Smith left South Carolina fourth in program history in total catches and eighth in receiving yards. He also is tied for 13th in the record books for career touchdowns.

== Professional career ==
Pre-draft measurables
Height	Weight	Arm length	Hand span	40-yard dash	10-yard split	20-yard split	20-yard shuttle	Three-cone drill	Vertical jump	Broad jump
5 ft 9 1/2 in (1.77 m)	186 lb (84 kg)	31 7/8 in (0.81 m)	9 1/2 in (0.24 m)	4.43 s	1.60 s	2.62 s	4.22 s	6.83 s	36.0 in (0.91 m)	10 ft 3 in (3.12 m)
All values from Pro Day

=== Carolina Panthers ===
Smith was selected by the Carolina Panthers with the 204th pick in the sixth round of the 2021 NFL draft. On May 13, 2021, Smith signed his four-year rookie contract with Carolina. On December 11, 2022, Smith scored his first career touchdown against the Seattle Seahawks on a 13-yard pass from Sam Darnold.

On August 29, 2023, Smith was waived by the Panthers.

=== Tennessee Titans ===
On September 26, 2023, Smith was signed to the Tennessee Titans' practice squad. His contract expired when the team's season ended January 7, 2024.

=== Kansas City Chiefs ===
On January 17, 2024, Smith signed a reserve/future contract with the Kansas City Chiefs. He was waived by Kansas City on May 4, 2024.

=== Birmingham Stallions ===
On January 13, 2025, Smith signed with the Birmingham Stallions of the United Football League (UFL). He retired from professional football on March 14.

== Personal life ==
On March 25, 2022, Smith was arrested for unlawfully carrying a handgun, drug possession, and speeding in South Carolina.
