= 2019 San Francisco 49ers season =

American football team season

- Owner: Jed York
- General manager: John Lynch
- Head coach: Kyle Shanahan
- Offensive coordinator: Kyle Shanahan (de facto)
- Defensive coordinator: Robert Saleh
- Home stadium: Levi's Stadium

Results
- Record: 13–3
- Division place: 1st NFC West
- Playoffs: Won Divisional Playoffs (vs. Vikings) 27–10; Won NFC Championship (vs. Packers) 37–20; Lost Super Bowl LIV (vs. Chiefs) 20–31
- All-Pros: 3: TE George Kittle (1st team); DT DeForest Buckner (2nd team); CB Richard Sherman (2nd team)
- Pro Bowlers: 4: Selected but did not participate due to participation in Super Bowl LIV: FB Kyle Juszczyk; TE George Kittle; DE Nick Bosa; CB Richard Sherman

Uniform
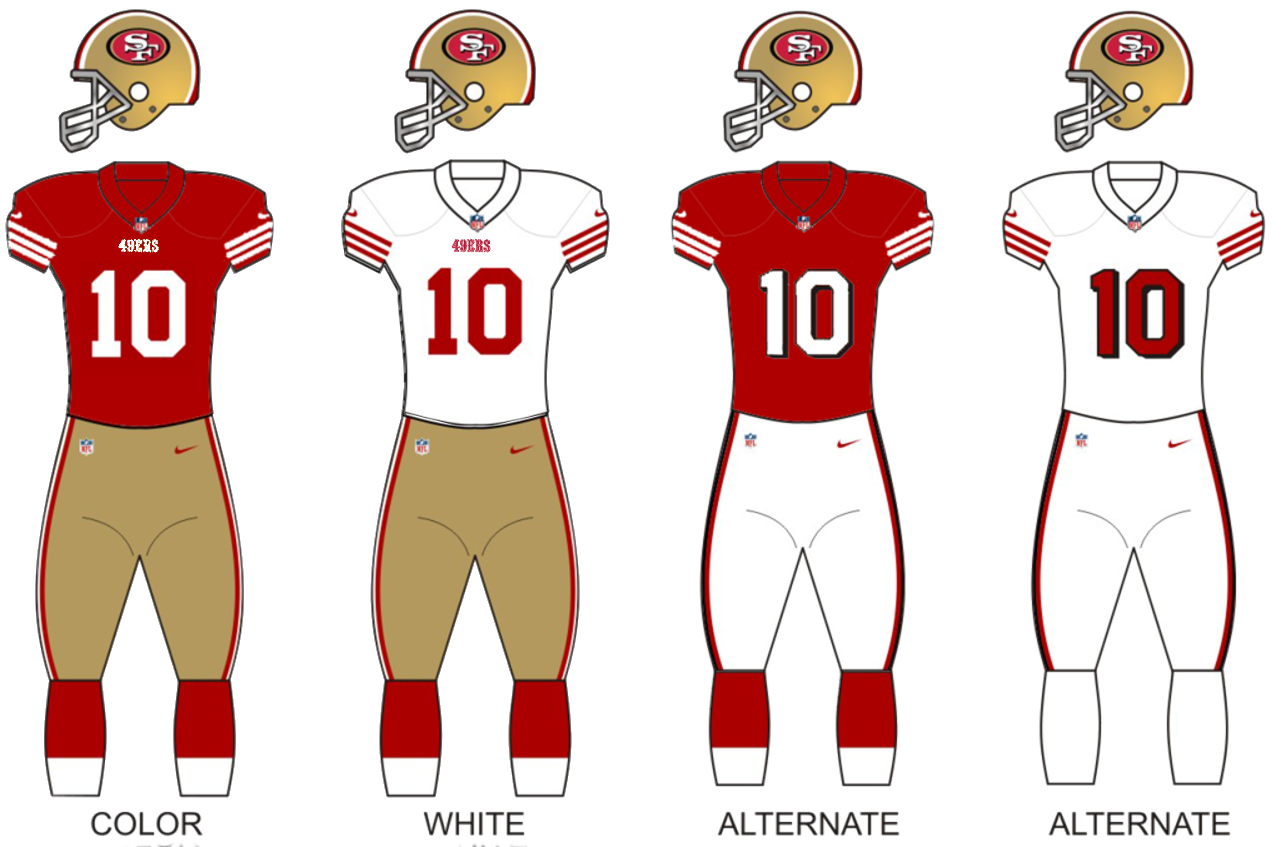

The 2019 season was the San Francisco 49ers' 70th in the National Football League (NFL), their 74th overall and their third under the head coach-general manager tandem of Kyle Shanahan and John Lynch. They finished their 2019 season with a 13–3 record, their best finish since 2011. Starting the season 8–0 for the first time since 1990, the 49ers surpassed their win totals from the 2016, 2017, and 2018 seasons combined. The 49ers were the second straight NFC West team to start 8–0, with the other being the 2018 Rams. With a Week 11 win over the Arizona Cardinals, the 49ers clinched their first winning season since 2013. Despite a loss to the Atlanta Falcons in Week 15, the 49ers clinched a playoff spot for the first time since 2013 with a Los Angeles Rams loss. The 49ers beat the Cardinals for the first time since 2014, won in Seattle for the first time since 2011, and beat the Panthers in the regular season for the first time since 2001.

The 49ers saw significant improvements during the season on both sides of the ball, with some analysts naming it one of the greatest single-season turnarounds in NFL history. Their offense finished second in the league in scoring (479 points, most for the franchise since 1998), second in rushing yards per game (144 yards per game), first in rushing touchdowns (23), and third in point differential (+169). The defense was sixth in the league in forced turnovers (27), second in total defense (281.8 yards per game), first in passing defense (169.2 yards per game), and fourth in sacks (48). This was the first time since 2003 that the 49ers finished in the top 10 in both scoring and yards per game.

The 49ers had the best record in their conference, winning the head-to-head sweep tiebreaker with the Packers and New Orleans Saints. This was the first time the 49ers obtained home-field advantage throughout the playoffs since the 1997 season. In the playoffs, the 49ers defeated the Minnesota Vikings in the Divisional Round and the Packers in the NFC Championship Game, advancing to Super Bowl LIV, their first championship appearance since the 2012 season. However, the 49ers lost Super Bowl LIV to the Kansas City Chiefs 31–20. Despite having a 20–10 lead heading into the fourth quarter, the 49ers suffered their second Super Bowl loss in franchise history. It was the first time the 49ers lost a Super Bowl when leading after the third quarter (previously 4–0). The Niners also failed to join the Pittsburgh Steelers and New England Patriots as the only franchises to win six Super Bowls, or win their first title in 25 years.

== 2019 NFL draft ==
2019 San Francisco 49ers draft
Round	Pick	Player	Position	College	Notes
1	2	Nick Bosa *	DE	Ohio State	
2	36	Deebo Samuel *	WR	South Carolina	
3	67	Jalen Hurd	WR	Baylor	
4	110	Mitch Wishnowsky	P	Utah	
5	148	Dre Greenlaw	LB	Arkansas	
6	176	Kaden Smith	TE	Stanford	
6	183	Justin Skule	OT	Vanderbilt	
6	198	Tim Harris	CB	Virginia	
Made roster * Made at least one Pro Bowl during career

Notes

- The 49ers traded their fifth-round selection to the Detroit Lions in exchange for guard Laken Tomlinson.
- The 49ers conditionally swapped seventh-round selections with the Kansas City Chiefs in a trade in which the 49ers acquired wide receiver Rod Streater from the Chiefs.
- The 49ers traded Kansas City Chiefs seventh-round selection to the Cleveland Browns in exchange for tackle Shon Coleman.
- As the result of a negative differential of free agent signings and departures that the 49ers experienced during the 2018 free agency period, the team has received one six-round compensatory selection for the 2019 draft.

== Staff ==
2019 San Francisco 49ers staff
Front office: Co-chairman – Denise DeBartolo York; Co-chairman – John York; Chief executive officer – Jed York; Co-owner – John M. Sobrato; Co-owner – Mark Wan; Co-owner – Gideon Yu; General manager – John Lynch; President of 49ers Enterprises and EVP of football operations – Paraag Marathe; President – Al Guido; General counsel – Hannah Gordon; Chief investment officer – Brano Perkovich; Chief financial officer – Scott Sabatino; Vice president of player personnel – Adam Peters; Vice president of player personnel – Martin Mayhew; Vice president and senior advisor to the general manager – Keena Turner; Director of pro personnel – Ran Carthon; Director of football administration & analytics – Brian Hampton; Head coaches: Head coach – Kyle Shanahan; Assistant head coach/tight ends – Jon Embree; Offensive coaches: Passing game coordinator – Mike LaFleur; Run game coordinator – Mike McDaniel; Quarterbacks – Shane Day; Running backs – Bobby Turner; Wide receivers – Wes Welker; Offensive line – John Benton; Assistant offensive line – Zach Yenser; Offensive assistant – Bobby Slowik; Offensive assistant – Katie Sowers; Offensive quality control – Miles Austin; Offensive quality control – Taylor Embree	Defensive coaches: Defensive coordinator – Robert Saleh; Defensive line – Kris Kocurek; Run game specialist/outside linebackers – Johnny Holland; Inside linebackers – DeMeco Ryans; Passing game coordinator/defensive backs – Joe Woods; Safeties – Daniel Bullocks; Defensive quality control – Brian Fleury; Pass rush specialist – Chris Kiffin; Special teams coaches: Special teams coordinator – Richard Hightower; Assistant special teams – Michael Clay; Assistant special teams – Stan Kwan; Strength and conditioning: Head strength and conditioning – Dustin Perry; Assistant strength and conditioning – Aaron Hill; Assistant strength and conditioning – Mike Nicolini; Assistant strength and conditioning – Shea Thompson

== Final roster ==
2019 San Francisco 49ers roster
Quarterbacks (QB): 3 C. J. Beathard; 4 Nick Mullens; 10 Jimmy Garoppolo; Running backs (RB): 22 Matt Breida; 26 Tevin Coleman; 44 Kyle Juszczyk FB; 31 Raheem Mostert; 30 Jeff Wilson; Wide receivers (WR): 84 Kendrick Bourne; 13 Richie James; 81 Jordan Matthews; 18 Dante Pettis; 19 Deebo Samuel; 17 Emmanuel Sanders; Tight ends (TE): 82 Ross Dwelley; 43 Daniel Helm; 85 George Kittle; 83 Levine Toilolo	Offensive linemen (OL): 60 Daniel Brunskill T/G; 63 Ben Garland C; 69 Mike McGlinchey T; 68 Mike Person G; 67 Justin Skule T; 74 Joe Staley T; 75 Laken Tomlinson G; Defensive linemen (DL): 91 Arik Armstead DE; 97 Nick Bosa DE; 99 DeForest Buckner DT; 96 Sheldon Day DT; 55 Dee Ford DE; 90 Kevin Givens DT; 95 Kentavius Street DE; 94 Solomon Thomas DT; 92 Anthony Zettel DE	Linebackers (LB): 51 Azeez Al-Shaair OLB; 47 Elijah Lee OLB; 57 Dre Greenlaw OLB; 53 Mark Nzeocha MLB; 54 Fred Warner MLB; Defensive backs (DB): 38 Antone Exum SS; 36 Marcell Harris SS; 35 Dontae Johnson CB; 33 Tarvarius Moore FS; 41 Emmanuel Moseley CB; 32 D. J. Reed CB; 25 Richard Sherman CB; 29 Jaquiski Tartt SS; 20 Jimmie Ward FS; 24 K'Waun Williams CB; 23 Ahkello Witherspoon CB; Special teams (ST): 9 Robbie Gould K; 86 Kyle Nelson LS; 6 Mitch Wishnowsky P	Practice squad: 50 Joey Alfieri OLB; 65 Kofi Amichia G; 78 Alex Barrett DE; 45 Demetrius Flannigan-Fowles OLB (IR); 62 Jaryd Jones-Smith T; 48 Jermaine Kelly CB; 76 Ross Reynolds G; 40 Teez Tabor CB; 46 Jacob Thieneman FS; 89 Chris Thompson WR; Reserve: 56 Kwon Alexander OLB (IR); 98 Ronald Blair DE (IR); 88 Garrett Celek TE (IR); 78 Shon Coleman T (IR); 11 Marquise Goodwin WR (IR); 35 Tim Harris CB (IR); 14 Jalen Hurd WR (IR); 93 D. J. Jones DT (IR); 64 Andrew Lauderdale T (IR); 28 Jerick McKinnon RB (IR); 90 Damontre Moore DE (IR); 1 Shawn Poindexter WR (IR); 58 Weston Richburg C (IR); 77 Jullian Taylor DT (IR); 15 Trent Taylor WR (IR); 27 Jason Verrett CB (IR); Rookies in italics 53 active, 17 reserve, 9 practice squad

== Preseason ==
Week	Date	Opponent	Result	Record	Venue	Recap
1	August 10	Dallas Cowboys	W 17–9	1–0	Levi's Stadium	Recap
2	August 19	at Denver Broncos	W 24–15	2–0	Broncos Stadium at Mile High	Recap
3	August 24	at Kansas City Chiefs	W 27–17	3–0	Arrowhead Stadium	Recap
4	August 29	Los Angeles Chargers	L 24–27	3–1	Levi's Stadium	Recap

== Regular season ==
=== Schedule ===
Week	Date	Opponent	Result	Record	Venue	Recap
1	September 8	at Tampa Bay Buccaneers	**W** 31–17	1–0	Raymond James Stadium	Recap
2	September 15	at Cincinnati Bengals	**W** 41–17	2–0	Paul Brown Stadium	Recap
3	September 22	Pittsburgh Steelers	**W** 24–20	3–0	Levi's Stadium	Recap
4	Bye					
5	October 7	Cleveland Browns	**W** 31–3	4–0	Levi's Stadium	Recap
6	October 13	at **Los Angeles Rams**	**W** 20–7	5–0	Los Angeles Memorial Coliseum	Recap
7	October 20	at Washington Redskins	**W** 9–0	6–0	FedExField	Recap
8	October 27	Carolina Panthers	**W** 51–13	7–0	Levi's Stadium	Recap
9	October 31	at **Arizona Cardinals**	**W** 28–25	8–0	State Farm Stadium	Recap
10	November 11	**Seattle Seahawks**	**L** 24–27 (OT)	8–1	Levi's Stadium	Recap
11	November 17	**Arizona Cardinals**	**W** 36–26	9–1	Levi's Stadium	Recap
12	November 24	Green Bay Packers	**W** 37–8	10–1	Levi's Stadium	Recap
13	December 1	at Baltimore Ravens	**L** 17–20	10–2	M&T Bank Stadium	Recap
14	December 8	at New Orleans Saints	**W** 48–46	11–2	Mercedes-Benz Superdome	Recap
15	December 15	Atlanta Falcons	**L** 22–29	11–3	Levi's Stadium	Recap
16	December 21	**Los Angeles Rams**	**W** 34–31	12–3	Levi's Stadium	Recap
17	December 29	at **Seattle Seahawks**	**W** 26–21	13–3	CenturyLink Field	Recap
Note: Intra-division opponents are in **bold** text.

=== Game summaries ===
==== Week 1: at Tampa Bay Buccaneers ====
Week One: San Francisco 49ers at Tampa Bay Buccaneers – Game summary

Quarter	1	2	3	4	Total
**49ers**	3	3	14	11	**31**
Buccaneers	0	7	7	3	**17**

at Raymond James Stadium, Tampa, Florida

- Date: September 8
- Game time: 4:25 p.m. EDT/1:25 p.m. PDT
- Game weather: Cloudy, 93 °F (34 °C)
- Game attendance: 55,976
- Referee: Alex Kemp
- TV announcers (Fox): Kenny Albert, Ronde Barber and Lindsay Czarniak
- Recap, Game Book

Game information

**First quarter**

- SF – Robbie Gould 29-yard field goal, 11:08. 49ers 3–0. **Drive: 6 plays, 22 yards, 2:20.**

**Second quarter**

- TB – Vernon Hargreaves 15-yard interception return (Matt Gay kick) 8:41. Buccaneers 7–3.
- SF – Robbie Gould 36-yard field goal, 2:55. Buccaneers 7–6. **Drive: 11 plays, 57 yards, 5:46.**

**Third quarter**

- SF – Richie James 39-yard pass from Jimmy Garoppolo (Robbie Gould kick), 12:31. 49ers 13–7. **Drive: 7 plays, 75 yards, 2:29.**
- SF – Richard Sherman 31-yard interception return (Robbie Gould kick) 11:44. 49ers 20–7.
- TB – Chris Godwin 10-yard pass from Jameis Winston (Matt Gay kick), 5:43. 49ers 20–14. **Drive: 11 plays, 75 yards, 6:01.**

**Fourth quarter**

- TB – Matt Gay 31-yard field goal, 4:47. 49ers 20–17. **Drive: 6 plays, 28 yards, 3:34.**
- SF – Robbie Gould 47-yard field goal, 2:17. 49ers 23–17. **Drive: 8 plays, 46 yards, 2:30.**
- SF – Ahkello Witherspoon 25-yard interception return (Jimmy Garoppolo–Deebo Samuel pass), 2:01. 49ers 31–17.

**Top passers**

- SF – Jimmy Garoppolo – 18/27, 166 yards, TD, INT
- TB – Jameis Winston – 20/36, 194 yards, TD, 3 INT

**Top rushers**

- SF – Raheem Mostert – 9 rushes, 40 yards
- TB – Ronald Jones – 13 rushes, 75 yards

**Top receivers**

- SF – George Kittle – 8 receptions, 54 yards
- TB – Chris Godwin – 3 receptions, 53 yards, TD

The revamped 49ers defense put on a show on opening day. Despite an average day by the 49ers offense, the defense dominated the Buccaneers offense. The defense sacked Jameis Winston three times and forced four turnovers, including returning two interceptions for touchdowns. The 49ers three interceptions in this game surpassed all of last year, as they only had two interceptions the entire season in 2018. The opening weekend victory put the 49ers at 1-0 for the first time since 2016

==== Week 2: at Cincinnati Bengals ====
Week Two: San Francisco 49ers at Cincinnati Bengals – Game summary

Quarter	1	2	3	4	Total
**49ers**	14	10	10	7	**41**
Bengals	7	3	0	7	**17**

at Paul Brown Stadium, Cincinnati, Ohio

- Date: September 15
- Game time: 1:00 pm. EDT/10:00 am. PDT
- Game weather: Mostly sunny, 81 °F (27 °C)
- Game attendance: 50,666
- Referee: Tony Corrente
- TV announcers (Fox): Thom Brennaman, Chris Spielman and Shannon Spake
- Recap, Game Book

Game information

**First quarter**

- SF – Marquise Goodwin 38-yard pass from Jimmy Garoppolo (Robbie Gould kick), 11:21. 49ers 7–0. **Drive: 4 plays, 51 yards, 1:44.**
- CIN – Tyler Eifert 1-yard pass from Andy Dalton (Randy Bullock kick), 6:43. Tied 7–7. **Drive: 9 plays, 69 yards, 4:38.**
- SF – Raheem Mostert 39-yard pass from Jimmy Garoppolo (Robbie Gould kick), 2:36. 49ers 14–7. **Drive: 8 plays, 84 yards, 4:07.**

**Second quarter**

- SF – Jeff Wilson 2-yard run (Robbie Gould kick), 10:09. 49ers 21–7. **Drive: 6 plays, 58 yards, 2:40.**
- CIN – Randy Bullock 37-yard field goal, 6:57. 49ers 21–10. **Drive: 10 plays, 61 yards, 3:12.**
- SF – Robbie Gould 33-yard field goal, 0:02. 49ers 24–10. **Drive: 10 plays, 52 yards, 1:12.**

**Third quarter**

- SF – Deebo Samuel 2-yard pass from Jimmy Garoppolo (Robbie Gould kick), 12:10. 49ers 31–10. **Drive: 7 plays, 75 yards, 2:50.**
- SF – Robbie Gould 38-yard field goal, 4:34. 49ers 34–10. **Drive: 8 plays, 49 yards, 4:38.**

**Fourth quarter**

- SF – Jeff Wilson 4-yard run (Robbie Gould kick), 14:56. 49ers 41–10. **Drive: 6 plays, 82 yards, 3:13.**
- CIN – John Ross 66-yard pass from Andy Dalton (Randy Bullock kick), 0:45. 49ers 41–17. **Drive: 4 plays, 72 yards, 1:09.**

**Top passers**

- SF – Jimmy Garoppolo – 17/25, 297 yards, 3 TD, INT
- CIN – Andy Dalton – 26/42, 311 yards, 2 TD, INT

**Top rushers**

- SF – Matt Breida – 12 rushes, 121 yards
- CIN – Joe Mixon – 11 rushes, 17 yards

**Top receivers**

- SF – Deebo Samuel – 5 receptions, 87 yards, TD
- CIN – Tyler Boyd – 10 receptions, 122 yards

The 49ers were the road team for the second consecutive game, and they routed the Bengals 41–17 with their most complete performance in years. The 49ers offense racked up an astounding 571 yards of offense, including 259 yards rushing. They averaged 6.2 yards per rush and 8.4 yards per play during the game. Jimmy Garoppolo finished 17–25 passing with 296 yards and three touchdown passes, while Matt Breida lead the team with 121 yards rushing. The 49ers defense surrendered just 25 yards rushing, along with four sacks and one turnover. The blowout win over the Bengals on the road helped the 49ers to their first 2–0 start since 2012. The 49ers were 0–8 on the road during the 2018 season, but they started the 2019 season 2–0 on the road.

==== Week 3: vs. Pittsburgh Steelers ====
Week Three: Pittsburgh Steelers at San Francisco 49ers – Game summary

Quarter	1	2	3	4	Total
Steelers	6	0	7	7	**20**
**49ers**	0	3	14	7	**24**

at Levi's Stadium, Santa Clara, California

- Date: September 22
- Game time: 1:25 pm. PDT
- Game weather: Partly cloudy, 79 °F (26 °C)
- Game attendance: 69,439
- Referee: Scott Novak
- TV announcers (CBS): Greg Gumbel, Trent Green and Melanie Collins
- Recap, Game Book

Game information

**First quarter**

- PIT – Chris Boswell 46-yard field goal, 11:47. Steelers 3–0. **Drive: 4 plays, 5 yards, 2:00.**
- PIT – Chris Boswell 26-yard field goal, 2:04. Steelers 6–0. **Drive: 6 plays, 16 yards, 2:40.**

**Second quarter**

- SF – Robbie Gould 24-yard field goal, 6:45. Steelers 6–3. **Drive: 9 plays, 43 yards, 3:52.**

**Third quarter**

- SF – Jeff Wilson 1-yard run (Robbie Gould kick), 9:17. 49ers 10–6. **Drive: 8 plays, 38 yards, 4:02.**
- PIT – JuJu Smith-Schuster 76-yard pass from Mason Rudolph (Chris Boswell kick), 5:42. Steelers 13–10. **Drive: 3 plays, 82 yards, 1:31.**
- SF – Jeff Wilson 4-yard run (Robbie Gould kick), 0:56. 49ers 17–13. **Drive: 10 plays, 75 yards, 4:46.**

**Fourth quarter**

- PIT – Diontae Johnson 39-yard pass from Mason Rudolph (Chris Boswell kick), 10:22. Steelers 20–17. **Drive: 2 plays, 81 yards, 0:56.**
- SF – Dante Pettis 5-yard pass from Jimmy Garoppolo (Robbie Gould kick), 1:15. 49ers 24–20. **Drive: 7 plays, 24 yards, 4:14.**

**Top passers**

- PIT – Mason Rudolph – 14/27, 174 yards, 2 TD, INT
- SF – Jimmy Garoppolo – 23/32, 277 yards, TD, 2 INT

**Top rushers**

- PIT – James Conner – 13 rushes, 43 yards
- SF – Raheem Mostert – 12 rushes, 79 yards

**Top receivers**

- PIT – JuJu Smith-Schuster – 3 receptions, 81 yards, TD
- SF – George Kittle – 6 receptions, 57 yards

The 49ers faced adversity for the first time during the 2019 season. Despite outgaining the Steelers in yardage 436–239, the game was close due to the 49ers committing an unprecedented five turnovers, including three fumbles inside the Steelers 25-yard line. The worst of the bunch came with 6:49 left in the game; with the 49ers at third-and-goal from the Pittsburgh 7-yard line, an errant snap hit 49ers running back Jeff Wilson Jr (who was in motion), and was recovered by T. J. Watt of the Steelers. The 49ers defense responded by forcing Steelers James Conner to fumble, giving San Francisco the ball back. From there, Garoppolo hit Dante Pettis for a 5-yard touchdown pass, giving the 49ers the lead with just 1:15 left to play. The 49ers defense then held to give them the 24–20 win. Points off turnovers ended up being the difference; despite the five turnovers given up, the 49ers held Pittsburgh to just six points off them, both coming on Chris Boswell field goals in the first quarter. The close win over the Steelers at home helped the 49ers to their first 3–0 start since 1998 as they went into their bye week.

==== Week 5: vs. Cleveland Browns ====
Week Five: Cleveland Browns at San Francisco 49ers – Game summary

Quarter	1	2	3	4	Total
Browns	0	3	0	0	**3**
**49ers**	14	7	7	3	**31**

at Levi's Stadium, Santa Clara, California

- Date: October 7
- Game time: 5:15 pm. PDT
- Game weather: Clear, 87 °F (31 °C)
- Game attendance: 70,585
- Referee: Jerome Boger
- TV announcers (ESPN): Joe Tessitore, Booger McFarland, Lisa Salters and John Parry
- Recap, Game Book

Game information

**First quarter**

- SF – Matt Breida 83-yard run (Robbie Gould kick), 13:17. 49ers 7–0. **Drive: 1 play, 83 yards, 0:11.**
- SF – Matt Breida 5-yard pass from Jimmy Garoppolo (Robbie Gould kick), 6:26. 49ers 14–0. **Drive: 8 plays, 74 yards, 3:57.**

**Second quarter**

- CLE – Austin Seibert 30-yard field goal, 11:22. 49ers 14–3. **Drive: 10 plays, 51 yards, 4:47.**
- SF – Tevin Coleman 19-yard run (Robbie Gould kick), 1:54. 49ers 21–3. **Drive: 6 plays, 49 yards, 2:51.**

**Third quarter**

- SF – George Kittle 22-yard pass from Jimmy Garoppolo (Robbie Gould kick), 10:37. 49ers 28–3. **Drive: 9 plays, 90 yards, 4:23.**

**Fourth quarter**

- SF – Robbie Gould 44-yard field goal, 5:08. 49ers 31–3. **Drive: 4 plays, 3 yards, 1:54.**

**Top passers**

- CLE – Baker Mayfield – 8/22, 100 yards, 2 INT
- SF – Jimmy Garoppolo – 20/29, 181 yards, 2 TD

**Top rushers**

- CLE – Nick Chubb – 16 rushes, 87 yards
- SF – Matt Breida – 11 rushes, 114 yards, TD

**Top receivers**

- CLE – Jarvis Landry – 4 receptions, 75 yards
- SF – George Kittle – 6 receptions, 70 yards, TD

The blowout win over the Browns at home helped the 49ers to their first 4–0 start since 1990, during the Joe Montana era. Notably, 49ers DE Nick Bosa celebrated a sack of Browns QB Baker Mayfield with a faux flag planting motion, echoing Mayfield's own celebration some years earlier when the two faced off at the NCAA level.

==== Week 6: at Los Angeles Rams ====
Week Six: San Francisco 49ers at Los Angeles Rams – Game summary

Quarter	1	2	3	4	Total
**49ers**	7	0	10	3	**20**
Rams	7	0	0	0	**7**

at Los Angeles Memorial Coliseum, Los Angeles, California

- Date: October 13
- Game time: 1:05 pm. PDT
- Game weather: Sunny, 77 °F (25 °C)
- Game attendance: 75,695
- Referee: Bill Vinovich
- TV announcers (Fox): Dick Stockton, Mark Schlereth and Jennifer Hale
- Recap, Game Book

Game information

**First quarter**

- LAR – Robert Woods 8-yard run (Greg Zuerlein kick), 9:17. Rams 7–0. **Drive: 7 plays, 56 yards, 3:36.**
- SF – Tevin Coleman 2-yard run (Robbie Gould kick), 3:39. Tied 7–7. **Drive: 10 plays, 75 yards, 5:38.**

**Second quarter**

- No scoring plays.

**Third quarter**

- SF – Jimmy Garoppolo 1-yard run (Robbie Gould kick), 12:50. 49ers 14–7. **Drive: 4 plays, 17 yards, 2:01.**
- SF – Robbie Gould 25-yard field goal, 4:58. 49ers 17–7. **Drive: 12 plays, 50 yards, 6:18.**

**Fourth quarter**

- SF – Robbie Gould 34-yard field goal, 12:03. 49ers 20–7. **Drive: 11 plays, 43 yards, 6:38.**

**Top passers**

- SF – Jimmy Garoppolo – 24/33, 243 yards, INT
- LAR – Jared Goff – 13/24, 78 yards

**Top rushers**

- SF – Tevin Coleman – 18 rushes, 45 yards, TD
- LAR – Malcolm Brown – 11 rushes, 40 yards

**Top receivers**

- SF – George Kittle – 8 receptions, 103 yards
- LAR – Tyler Higbee – 3 receptions, 25 yards

This game was the biggest test of the year so far for the 49ers, as they played the defending NFC champion Rams. Multiple sports analysts predicted the Rams to win. The result was the 49ers' best defensive effort in years. They held the high-powered Rams offense to just 157 total yards and seven points, which the Rams scored on their first possession of the game (a Robert Woods 8-yard touchdown run). The Rams were shut out for the remainder of the game. A goal line stand by the 49ers defense in the second quarter, in which Malcolm Brown was stuffed on fourth-and-goal from the 1-yard line and 49ers defensive coordinator Robert Saleh garnered fame for his ebullient reaction to the play, flipped the script in the 49ers' favor. Rams quarterback Jared Goff threw for just 78 yards during the game and was sacked four times. The 49ers had 331 yards of offense and 22 first downs compared to the Rams, who had 157 yards and just 10 first downs.

With the win over the Rams on the road, the 49ers started 5–0 for the first time since 1990.

==== Week 7: at Washington Redskins ====
Week Seven: San Francisco 49ers at Washington Redskins – Game summary

Quarter	1	2	3	4	Total
**49ers**	0	0	3	6	**9**
Redskins	0	0	0	0	**0**

at FedEx Field, Landover, Maryland

- Date: October 20
- Game time: 1:00 pm. EDT/10:00 am. PDT
- Game weather: Rain, 55 °F (13 °C)
- Game attendance: 61,459
- Referee: Clete Blakeman
- TV announcers (Fox): Chris Myers, Daryl Johnston and Laura Okmin
- Recap, Game Book

Game information

**First quarter**

- No scoring plays.

**Second quarter**

- No scoring plays.

**Third quarter**

- SF – Robbie Gould 28-yard field goal, 5:28. 49ers 3–0. **Drive: 8 plays, 67 yards, 4:37.**

**Fourth quarter**

- SF – Robbie Gould 22-yard field goal, 9:03. 49ers 6–0. **Drive: 12 plays, 55 yards, 7:17.**
- SF – Robbie Gould 29-yard field goal, 0:23. 49ers 9–0. **Drive: 11 plays, 56 yards, 6:19.**

**Top passers**

- SF – Jimmy Garoppolo – 12/21, 151 yards, INT
- WAS – Case Keenum – 9/12, 77 yards

**Top rushers**

- SF – Tevin Coleman – 20 rushes, 62 yards
- WAS – Adrian Peterson – 20 rushes, 81 yards

**Top receivers**

- SF – Kendrick Bourne – 3 receptions, 69 yards
- WAS – Trey Quinn – 2 receptions, 30 yards

In a game that was affected by heavy rain and a slippery field, three field goals by 49ers Robbie Gould were the only scores in the game. The 49ers defense again dominated, holding the Redskins to just 154 yards of offense. This was the first shutout win for the 49ers since their 2016 season opener, ironically also against Case Keenum. With the road win over the Redskins, the 49ers started 6–0 for the first time since 1990. Their 9 points scored was the fewest by a winning team all season.

==== Week 8: vs. Carolina Panthers ====
Week Eight: Carolina Panthers at San Francisco 49ers – Game summary

Quarter	1	2	3	4	Total
Panthers	3	0	10	0	**13**
**49ers**	14	13	14	10	**51**

at Levi's Stadium, Santa Clara, California

- Date: October 27
- Game time: 1:05 pm. PDT
- Game weather: Sunny, 66 °F (19 °C)
- Game attendance: 69,083
- Referee: Shawn Smith
- TV announcers (Fox): Dick Stockton, Mark Schlereth and Jennifer Hale
- Recap, Game Book

Game information

**First quarter**

- SF – Emmanuel Sanders 4-yard pass from Jimmy Garoppolo (Robbie Gould kick), 9:14. 49ers 7–0. **Drive: 11 plays, 75 yards, 5:46.**
- CAR – Joey Slye 41-yard field goal, 4:23. 49ers 7–3. **Drive: 6 plays, 18 yards, 2:36.**
- SF – Tevin Coleman 19-yard run (Robbie Gould kick), 1:09. 49ers 14–3. **Drive: 6 plays, 75 yards, 3:14.**

**Second quarter**

- SF – Tevin Coleman 10-yard pass from Jimmy Garoppolo (Robbie Gould kick), 12:43. 49ers 21–3. **Drive: 3 plays, 27 yards, 1:03.**
- SF – Tevin Coleman 48-yard run (pass failed), 1:53. 49ers 27–3. **Drive: 4 plays, 63 yards, 1:55.**

**Third quarter**

- CAR – Bruce Irvin sacks Jimmy Garoppolo in endzone for a safety, 12:43. 49ers 27–5.
- CAR – Christian McCaffrey 40-yard run (Christian McCaffrey run), 11:15. 49ers 27–13. **Drive: 3 plays, 51 yards, 1:28.**
- SF – Deebo Samuel 20-yard run (Robbie Gould kick), 7:15. 49ers 34–13. **Drive: 8 plays, 75 yards, 4:00.**
- SF – Tevin Coleman 1-yard run (Robbie Gould kick), 0:29. 49ers 41–13. **Drive: 3 plays, 10 yards, 1:21.**

**Fourth quarter**

- SF – Robbie Gould 20-yard field goal, 12:52. 49ers 44–13. **Drive: 4 plays, 7 yards, 2:08.**
- SF – Raheem Mostert 41-yard run (Robbie Gould kick), 6:16. 49ers 51–13. **Drive: 1 play, 41 yards, 0:08.**

**Top passers**

- CAR – Kyle Allen – 19/37, 153 yards, 3 INT
- SF – Jimmy Garoppolo – 18/22, 175 yards, 2 TD, INT

**Top rushers**

- CAR – Christian McCaffrey – 14 rushes, 117 yards, TD
- SF – Tevin Coleman – 11 rushes, 105 yards, 3 TD

**Top receivers**

- CAR – Curtis Samuel – 4 receptions, 46 yards
- SF – George Kittle – 6 receptions, 86 yards

With the blowout win over the Panthers at home, the 49ers started 7–0 for the first time since 1990.

==== Week 9: at Arizona Cardinals ====
Week Nine: San Francisco 49ers at Arizona Cardinals – Game summary

Quarter	1	2	3	4	Total
**49ers**	7	14	7	0	**28**
Cardinals	7	0	7	11	**25**

at State Farm Stadium, Glendale, Arizona

- Date: October 31
- Game time: 5:20 p.m. MST & PDT
- Game weather: Sunny, 75 °F (24 °C) (retractable roof open)
- Game attendance: 60,986
- Referee: Brad Rogers
- TV announcers (Fox/NFLN/Amazon Prime): Joe Buck, Troy Aikman, Erin Andrews and Kristina Pink
- Recap, Game Book

Game information

**First quarter**

- ARI – Kenyan Drake 4-yard run (Zane Gonzalez kick), 12:11. Cardinals 7–0. **Drive: 6 plays, 71 yards, 2:49.**
- SF – George Kittle 30-yard pass from Jimmy Garoppolo (Robbie Gould kick), 0:04. Tied 7–7. **Drive: 8 plays, 59 yards, 4:26.**

**Second quarter**

- SF – Kendrick Bourne 7-yard pass from Jimmy Garoppolo (Robbie Gould kick), 8:58. 49ers 14–7. **Drive: 7 plays, 76 yards, 3:30.**
- SF – Emmanuel Sanders 1-yard pass from Jimmy Garoppolo (Robbie Gould kick), 0:00. 49ers 21–7. **Drive: 13 plays, 80 yards, 4:58.**

**Third quarter**

- ARI – KeeSean Johnson 9-yard pass from Kyler Murray (Zane Gonzalez kick), 9:01. 49ers 21–14. **Drive: 7 plays, 83 yards, 2:41.**
- SF – Dante Pettis 21-yard pass from Jimmy Garoppolo (Robbie Gould kick), 5:55. 49ers 28–14. **Drive: 7 plays, 75 yards, 3:06.**

**Fourth quarter**

- ARI – Zane Gonzalez 36-yard field goal, 9:24. 49ers 28–17. **Drive: 13 plays, 75 yards, 6:37.**
- ARI – Andy Isabella 88-yard pass from Kyler Murray (Kyler Murray–Kenyan Drake pass), 4:53. 49ers 28–25. **Drive: 2 plays, 90 yards, 0:35.**

**Top passers**

- SF – Jimmy Garoppolo – 28/37, 317 yards, 4 TD
- ARI – Kyler Murray – 17/24, 241 yards, 2 TD

**Top rushers**

- SF – Matt Breida – 15 rushes, 78 yards
- ARI – Kenyan Drake – 15 rushes, 110 yards, TD

**Top receivers**

- SF – Emmanuel Sanders – 7 receptions, 112 yards, TD
- ARI – Andy Isabella – 1 reception, 88 yards, TD

Coming into the game, the 49ers were on an eight-game winless streak against the Cardinals, having not beaten them since Week 17 of the 2014 season. The usually stout 49ers defense gave up an opening drive touchdown for the first time all year, giving up a 4-yard rushing touchdown to Kenyan Drake. The 49ers tied it just before the close of the first quarter with a 30-yard touchdown pass from Jimmy Garoppolo to George Kittle. The 49ers went into halftime with a 21–7 lead, aided by a blunder by Cardinals coach Kliff Kingsbury; he called a timeout when the 49ers had been stuffed at the goal line on fourth-and-goal. The timeout gave the 49ers another chance, and they converted with an Emmanuel Sanders 1-yard touchdown catch. The 49ers built a 28–14 lead in the third quarter with a 21-yard touchdown catch by Dante Pettis. A furious comeback by the Cardinals made it a three-point game, but the 49ers ended the game with an 11 play drive, including three third down conversions. The last was an 11-yard pass by Garoppolo to Ross Dwelley on third-and-9 to seal the game. Jimmy Garoppolo had his finest game as a 49er, throwing for 317 yards and four touchdown passes, a career high. With the close win over the Cardinals on the road, the 49ers started 8–0 for the first time since 1990, and had their first win against Arizona in five seasons.

==== Week 10: vs. Seattle Seahawks ====
Week Ten: Seattle Seahawks at San Francisco 49ers – Game summary

Quarter	1	2	3	4	OT	Total
**Seahawks**	0	7	14	3	3	**27**
49ers	10	0	0	14	0	**24**

at Levi's Stadium, Santa Clara, California

- Date: November 11
- Game time: 5:15 pm. PST
- Game weather: Mostly clear, 77 °F (25 °C)
- Game attendance: 71,404
- Referee: Alex Kemp
- TV announcers (ESPN): Joe Tessitore, Booger McFarland, Lisa Salters and John Parry
- Recap, Game Book

Game information

**First quarter**

- SF – Chase McLaughlin 43-yard field goal, 8:19. 49ers 3–0. **Drive: 13 plays, 50 yards, 6:41.**
- SF – Kendrick Bourne 10-yard pass from Jimmy Garoppolo (Chase McLaughlin kick), 2:03. 49ers 10–0. **Drive: 7 plays, 83 yards, 4:14.**

**Second quarter**

- SEA – Jadeveon Clowney 10-yard fumble return (Jason Myers kick), 2:51. 49ers 10–7.

**Third quarter**

- SEA – Jacob Hollister 3-yard pass from Russell Wilson (Jason Myers kick), 4:37. Seahawks 14–10. **Drive: 3 plays, 16 yards, 1:30.**
- SEA – Chris Carson 1-yard run (Jason Myers kick), 1:42. Seahawks 21–10. **Drive: 4 plays, 24 yards, 1:57.**

**Fourth quarter**

- SF – DeForest Buckner 12-yard fumble return (Jimmy Garoppolo–Kendrick Bourne pass), 12:01. Seahawks 21–18.
- SF – Chase McLaughlin 39-yard field goal, 6:17. Tied 21–21. **Drive: 8 plays, 48 yards, 4:05.**
- SEA – Jason Myers 46-yard field goal, 1:45. Seahawks 24–21. **Drive: 11 plays, 47 yards, 4:32.**
- SF – Chase McLaughlin 47-yard field goal, 0:01. Tied 24–24. **Drive: 10 plays, 45 yards, 1:44.**

**Overtime**

- SEA – Jason Myers 42-yard field goal, 0:00. Seahawks 27–24. **Drive: 7 plays, 40 yards, 1:25.**

**Top passers**

- SEA – Russell Wilson – 24/34, 234 yards, TD, INT
- SF – Jimmy Garoppolo – 24/46, 248 yards, TD, INT

**Top rushers**

- SEA – Chris Carson – 25 rushes, 89 yards, TD
- SF – Tevin Coleman – 9 rushes, 40 yards

**Top receivers**

- SEA – DK Metcalf – 6 receptions, 70 yards
- SF – Deebo Samuel – 8 receptions, 112 yards

The 49ers welcomed the archrival Seattle Seahawks in a Monday Night Football showdown in a highly anticipated game. The 49ers had a great start, taking a 10–0 lead after a 10-yard touchdown catch by receiver Kendrick Bourne. But after Emmanuel Sanders went out of the game with an injury (the 49ers were also without top tight end George Kittle and kicker Robbie Gould due to injuries), the 49ers offense sputtered for over two quarters, allowing the Seahawks to take control. After falling behind 21–10 in the third quarter, the game changed in the 49ers' favor after a strip sack of Russell Wilson led to a 12-yard fumble recovery touchdown by DeForest Buckner. The 49ers sent it into overtime with a field goal by kicker Chase McLauglin as time expired. In overtime, the Seahawks were able to get to the 49ers' 14-yard line, but Dre Greenlaw intercepted the ball and returned it to the Seattle 49-yard line. With the game on the line, replacement kicker McLaughlin shanked the game-winning field goal, giving Seattle another try. Kicker Jason Myers of Seattle won it as time expired. The two teams combined for seven turnovers (four by Seattle; three by San Francisco). With their first loss of the season, the 49ers fell to 8–1. It also dropped the 49ers' record to 1–11 in the last 12 games against the Seahawks.

==== Week 11: vs. Arizona Cardinals ====
Week Eleven: Arizona Cardinals at San Francisco 49ers – Game summary

Quarter	1	2	3	4	Total
Cardinals	9	7	3	7	**26**
**49ers**	0	10	7	19	**36**

at Levi's Stadium, Santa Clara, California

- Date: November 17
- Game time: 1:05 pm. PST
- Game weather: Sunny, 72 °F (22 °C)
- Game attendance: 69,419
- Referee: Walt Anderson
- TV announcers (Fox): Chris Myers, Daryl Johnston and Laura Okmin
- Recap, Game Book

Game information

**First quarter**

- ARI – Zane Gonzalez 26-yard field goal, 10:31. Cardinals 3–0 **Drive: 10 plays, 67 yards, 4:29.**
- ARI – Larry Fitzgerald 5-yard pass from Kyler Murray (kick failed, wide left), 4:04. Cardinals 9–0. **Drive: 11 plays, 81 yards, 5:08.**

**Second quarter**

- ARI – Pharoh Cooper 5-yard pass from Kyler Murray (Zane Gonzalez kick), 9:03. Cardinals 16–0. **Drive: 9 plays, 57 yards, 5:03.**
- SF – Ross Dwelley 4-yard pass from Jimmy Garoppolo (Chase McLaughlin kick), 7:52. Cardinals 16–7. **Drive: 5 plays, 75 yards, 1:11.**
- SF – Chase McLaughlin 43-yard field goal, 0:00. Cardinals 16–10 **Drive: 11 plays, 55 yards, 4:46.**

**Third quarter**

- SF – Ross Dwelley 5-yard pass from Jimmy Garoppolo (Chase McLaughlin kick), 11:07. 49ers 17–16. **Drive: 6 plays, 84 yards, 3:53.**
- ARI – Zane Gonzalez 43-yard field goal, 2:54. Cardinals 19–17 **Drive: 7 plays, 22 yards, 2:25.**

**Fourth quarter**

- SF – Kendrick Bourne 2-yard pass from Jimmy Garoppolo (pass failed), 12:14. 49ers 23–19. **Drive: 10 plays, 75 yards, 5:40.**
- ARI – Kyler Murray 22-yard run (Zane Gonzalez kick), 6:30. Cardinals 26–23. **Drive: 10 plays, 78 yards, 5:44.**
- SF – Jeff Wilson 25-yard pass from Jimmy Garoppolo (Chase McLaughlin kick), 0:31. 49ers 30–26. **Drive: 8 plays, 65 yards, 1:41.**
- SF – D. J. Reed 4-yard fumble return, 0:00. 49ers 36–26.

**Top passers**

- ARI – Kyler Murray – 23/31, 146 yards, 2 TD
- SF – Jimmy Garoppolo – 34/45, 424 yards, 4 TD, 2 INT

**Top rushers**

- ARI – Kyler Murray – 8 rushes, 67 yards, TD
- SF – Tevin Coleman – 12 rushes, 14 yards

**Top receivers**

- ARI – Christian Kirk – 6 receptions, 41 yards
- SF – Deebo Samuel – 8 reception, 134 yards

A week after their first loss of the season, the 49ers responded by coming out sluggish and uninspired, falling behind 16–0 to the Cardinals. The 49ers rallied to take the lead in the third quarter, only to give up a go-ahead touchdown to fall behind 26–23 with 5:44 left. On the next drive, quarterback Jimmy Garoppolo tossed an interception, all but dooming the 49ers. But the 49ers defense forced a quick three-and-out and got the ball back with 2:02 left in the game. Garoppolo led the 49ers down the field in crunch time and threw a game-winning 25-yard touchdown pass to Jeff Wilson with just 31 seconds left to lead the 49ers to victory. It was Garoppolo's second game-winning touchdown pass this season, the first being in Week 3 against the Steelers. The 49ers tacked on another six points due to a fumble on lateral tries by the Cardinals, which was returned for a touchdown. With the win over the Cardinals, the 49ers improved to 9–1. They clinched their first winning season and swept the season series with the Cardinals for the first time since 2013.

==== Week 12: vs. Green Bay Packers ====
Week Twelve: Green Bay Packers at San Francisco 49ers – Game summary

Quarter	1	2	3	4	Total
Packers	0	0	8	0	**8**
**49ers**	10	13	7	7	**37**

at Levi's Stadium, Santa Clara, California

- Date: November 24
- Game time: 5:20 pm. PST
- Game weather: Clear, 63 °F (17 °C)
- Game attendance: 71,500
- Referee: Carl Cheffers
- TV announcers (NBC): Al Michaels, Cris Collinsworth and Michele Tafoya
- Recap, Game Book

Game information

**First quarter**

- SF – Tevin Coleman 2-yard run (Chase McLaughlin kick), 13:07. 49ers 7–0 **Drive: 1 plays, 2 yards, 0:05.**
- SF – Chase McLaughlin 29-yard field goal, 3:13. 49ers 10–0 **Drive: 7 plays, 40 yards, 3:43.**

**Second quarter**

- SF – Chase McLaughlin 27-yard field goal, 2:55. 49ers 13–0 **Drive: 7 plays, 59 yards, 3:16.**
- SF – Deebo Samuel 42-yard pass from Jimmy Garoppolo (Chase McLaughlin kick), 0:58. 49ers 20–0 **Drive: 3 plays, 61 yards, 0:58.**
- SF – Chase McLaughlin 48-yard field goal, 0:00. 49ers 23–0 **Drive: 4 plays, 22 yards, 0:24.**

**Third quarter**

- GB – Davante Adams 2-yard pass from Aaron Rodgers (Aaron Rodgers–Davante Adams pass) 3:52. 49ers 23–8 **Drive: 13 plays, 65 yards, 8:34.**
- SF – George Kittle 61-yard pass from Jimmy Garoppolo (Chase McLaughlin kick), 2:55. 49ers 30–8 **Drive: 2 plays, 75 yards, 0:57.**

**Fourth quarter**

- SF – Raheem Mostert 15-yard run (Chase McLaughlin kick), 4:58. 49ers 37–8 **Drive: 10 plays, 69 yards, 6:31.**

**Top passers**

- GB – Aaron Rodgers – 20/33, 104 yards, TD
- SF – Jimmy Garoppolo – 14/20, 253 yards, 2 TD

**Top rushers**

- GB – Jamaal Williams – 11 rushes, 45 yards
- SF – Raheem Mostert – 6 rushes, 45 yards, TD

**Top receivers**

- GB – Davante Adams – 7 receptions, 43 yards, TD
- SF – George Kittle – 6 receptions, 129 yards, TD

The 49ers started a tough three-game span with a Sunday Night game against the NFC North Division Leader Packers. The 49ers hammered Green Bay, holding Aaron Rodgers to just 104 yards passing and the entire Green Bay offense to 198 yards. The Packers were also held to just 1.7 yards per pass play, a career low for Aaron Rodgers. On the first possession of the game, the 49ers defense forced a fumble and recovered on the Packers 2-yard line. The next play, Tevin Coleman ran for a 2-yard touchdown, giving the 49ers a 7–0 lead and setting the tone for the rest of the game. Touchdown catches of 42 yards (Deebo Samuel) and 61 yards (George Kittle) were more than enough as the 49ers built a 23–0 halftime lead and never looked back. With the blowout win over the Packers, the 49ers improved to 10–1 and reached 10 wins for the first time since 2013.

==== Week 13: at Baltimore Ravens ====
Week Thirteen: San Francisco 49ers at Baltimore Ravens – Game summary

Quarter	1	2	3	4	Total
49ers	7	7	3	0	**17**
**Ravens**	7	10	0	3	**20**

at M&T Bank Stadium, Baltimore, Maryland

- Date: December 1
- Game time: 1:00 pm. EST/10:00 am. PST
- Game weather: Rain, 40 °F (4 °C)
- Game attendance: 71,029
- Referee: Brad Allen
- TV announcers (Fox): Kevin Burkhardt, Charles Davis and Pam Oliver
- Recap, Game Book

Game information

**First quarter**

- SF – Deebo Samuel 33-yard pass from Jimmy Garoppolo (Robbie Gould kick), 11:53. 49ers 7–0 **Drive: 7 plays, 74 yards, 3:07.**
- BAL – Mark Andrews 20-yard pass from Lamar Jackson (Justin Tucker kick), 5:41. Tied 7–7 **Drive: 2 plays, 23 yards, 0:47.**

**Second quarter**

- BAL – Lamar Jackson 1-yard run (Justin Tucker kick), 12:02. Ravens 14–7 **Drive: 13 plays, 84 yards, 7:15.**
- SF – Raheem Mostert 40-yard run (Robbie Gould kick), 9:22. Tied 14–14 **Drive: 5 plays, 75 yards, 2:46.**
- BAL – Justin Tucker 30-yard field goal, 2:01. Ravens 17–14 **Drive: 13 plays, 63 yards, 7:14.**

**Third quarter**

- SF – Robbie Gould 32-yard field goal, 3:41. Tied 17–17 **Drive: 14 plays, 66 yards, 8:26.**

**Fourth quarter**

- BAL – Justin Tucker 49-yard field goal, 0:03. Ravens 20–17 **Drive: 12 plays, 34 yards, 6:25.**

**Top passers**

- SF – Jimmy Garoppolo – 15/21, 165 yards, TD
- BAL – Lamar Jackson – 14/23, 105 yards, TD

**Top rushers**

- SF – Raheem Mostert – 19 rushes, 146 yards, TD
- BAL – Lamar Jackson – 16 rushes, 101 yards, TD

**Top receivers**

- SF – Kendrick Bourne – 3 receptions, 42 yards
- BAL – Mark Andrews – 3 receptions, 50 yards, TD

The 49ers traveled to Baltimore seeking their eleventh win of the season against a red-hot Baltimore Ravens team. San Francisco opened the game with a seven-play possession culminating in a 33-yard touchdown pass from quarterback Jimmy Garoppolo to Deebo Samuel for a 7–0 lead. In doing so, the 49ers became the first team of the season to score an opening-drive touchdown against the Ravens. Following a Ravens punt, Garoppolo was sacked and fumbled the ball at his own 23, which was recovered by Baltimore. Two plays later the Ravens capitalized on the turnover, tying the game at 7 on a 20-yard Lamar Jackson touchdown pass to Mark Andrews. The 49ers punted on their next possession, after which Jackson orchestrated a 13-play drive culminating with him running the ball in from the 1-yard line for a touchdown and a 14–7 lead. The 49ers leveled the score on the ensuing drive with a 40-yard touchdown run by Raheem Mostert, but the Ravens regained the lead with a 30-yard Justin Tucker field goal, and led 17–14 at halftime. In the opening drive of the second half, the Ravens drove to the San Francisco 20-yard line before 49ers safety Marcell Harris stripped Jackson of the ball. The 49ers then went on a 14-play drive consuming 8:26 of clock time, but the drive stalled at the Baltimore 14 and they had to settle for a 32-yard Robbie Gould field goal, tying the game at 17. The score remained the same until, with 6:28 remaining in the game, Jackson and the Ravens drove the ball down to the San Francisco 31-yard line, where Tucker kicked a 49-yard field as time ran out. The 49ers dropped to 10–2 on the season with their second loss; both of them were decided by last-second field goals.

==== Week 14: at New Orleans Saints ====
Week Fourteen: San Francisco 49ers at New Orleans Saints – Game summary

Quarter	1	2	3	4	Total
**49ers**	7	21	7	13	**48**
Saints	13	14	6	13	**46**

at Mercedes-Benz Superdome, New Orleans, Louisiana

- Date: December 8
- Game time: 12:00 CST/10:00 am. PST
- Game weather: None (indoor stadium)
- Game attendance: 73,038
- Referee: John Hussey
- TV announcers (Fox): Kevin Burkhardt, Charles Davis and Pam Oliver
- Recap, Game Book

Game information

**First quarter**

- NO – Jared Cook 38-yard pass from Drew Brees (Wil Lutz kick), 11:34. Saints 7–0 **Drive: 9 plays, 73 yards, 3:26.**
- SF – Kendrick Bourne 6-yard pass from Jimmy Garoppolo (Robbie Gould kick), 8:26. Tied 7–7 **Drive: 6 plays, 75 yards, 3:08.**
- NO – Jared Cook 26-yard pass from Drew Brees (run failed), 4:51. Saints 13–7 **Drive: 6 plays, 54 yards, 3:35.**

**Second quarter**

- NO – Josh Hill 3-yard pass from Drew Brees (Wil Lutz kick), 14:57. Saints 20–7 **Drive: 5 plays, 29 yards, 2:31.**
- SF – Emmanuel Sanders 75-yard pass from Jimmy Garoppolo (Robbie Gould kick), 14:43. Saints 20–14 **Drive: 1 plays, 75 yards, 0:14.**
- NO – Drew Brees 1-yard run (Wil Lutz kick), 7:29. Saints 27–14 **Drive: 12 plays, 84 yards, 7:14.**
- SF – Raheem Mostert 35-yard pass from Emmanuel Sanders (Robbie Gould kick), 5:59. Saints 27–21 **Drive: 3 plays, 75 yards, 1:30.**
- SF – Raheem Mostert 10-yard run (Robbie Gould kick), 0:42. 49ers 28–27 **Drive: 9 plays, 80 yards, 3:34.**

**Third quarter**

- NO – Wil Lutz 55-yard field goal, 12:36. Saints 30–28 **Drive: 4 plays, 3 yards, 0:54.**
- SF – George Kittle 5-yard pass from Jimmy Garoppolo (Robbie Gould kick), 9:40. 49ers 35–30 **Drive: 2 plays, 20 yards, 0:48.**
- NO – Wil Lutz 48-yard field goal, 4:51. 49ers 35–33 **Drive: 10 plays, 45 yards, 4:49.**

**Fourth quarter**

- SF – Kendrick Bourne 6-yard pass from Jimmy Garoppolo (Robbie Gould kick), 8:59. 49ers 42–33 **Drive: 14 plays, 55 yards, 6:57.**
- NO – Michael Thomas 21-yard pass from Drew Brees (Wil Lutz kick), 6:06. 49ers 42–40 **Drive: 5 plays, 75 yards, 2:53.**
- SF – Robbie Gould 41-yard field goal, 2:23. 49ers 45–40 **Drive: 11 plays, 52 yards, 3:43.**
- NO – Tre'Quan Smith 18-yard pass from Drew Brees (pass failed), 0:53. Saints 46–45 **Drive: 7 plays, 76 yards, 1:30.**
- SF – Robbie Gould 30-yard field goal, 0:00. 49ers 48–46 **Drive: 7 plays, 63 yards, 0:53.**

**Top passers**

- SF – Jimmy Garoppolo – 26/35, 349 yards, 4 TD, INT
- NO – Drew Brees – 29/40, 349 yards, 5 TD

**Top rushers**

- SF – Raheem Mostert – 10 rushes, 69 yards, TD
- NO – Latavius Murray – 7 rushes, 69 yards

**Top receivers**

- SF – Emmanuel Sanders – 7 receptions, 157 yards, TD
- NO – Michael Thomas – 11 receptions, 134 yards, TD

In a game that had huge playoff seeding implications, including deciding the #1 seed, the 49ers prevailed in a back-and-forth affair in a 48–46 win in which both teams combined for 981 yards of offense. The 49ers fell behind 20–7 and 27–14 in the first half, surrendering touchdowns on the first four Saints possessions. But the 49ers rallied, with a trick play touchdown pass by Emmanuel Sanders to Raheem Mostert for 35 yards to cut the lead to 27–21. After forcing a punt, the 49ers went nine plays for 80 yards, with a Mostert 10-yard touchdown run to give the 49ers a 28–27 lead at halftime. The third quarter saw the 49ers outscore the Saints 7–6 to take a 35–33 lead into the final quarter. In the fourth quarter, the Saints scored a touchdown with 53 seconds left in the game to take a 46–45 lead. The following possession, with the 49ers facing a fourth-and-2 from their own 33-yard line with :39 left, Jimmy Garoppolo connected with George Kittle on a 39-yard pass to the New Orleans 28-yard line. A 15-yard face mask penalty by Saints safety Marcus Williams tacked on more yards during the play. Kicker Robbie Gould then connected on a 30-yard field goal as time expired, giving the 49ers the win. This was the second time this season the 49ers rallied from an early double-digit deficit and won. With the close win over the Saints, the 49ers improved to 11–2 on the season and they reached 11 wins for the first time since 2013.

As a result of this game, the 49ers finished the hardest three game stretch (by opponents' win percentage) in the Super Bowl era with a 2–1 record. No team has ever played three straight teams with an .800 or better winning percentage this late in the season.

==== Week 15: vs. Atlanta Falcons ====
Week Fifteen: Atlanta Falcons at San Francisco 49ers – Game summary

Quarter	1	2	3	4	Total
**Falcons**	0	10	0	19	**29**
49ers	0	10	3	9	**22**

at Levi's Stadium, Santa Clara, California

- Date: December 15
- Game time: 1:25 pm. PST
- Game weather: Partly cloudy, 55 °F (13 °C)
- Game attendance: 70,910
- Referee: Craig Wrolstad
- TV announcers (Fox): Chris Myers, Daryl Johnston and Laura Okmin
- Recap, Game Book

Game information

**First quarter**

- No scoring plays.

**Second quarter**

- SF – Raheem Mostert 2-yard run (Robbie Gould kick), 12:55. 49ers 7–0. **Drive: 21 plays, 88 yards, 10:43.**
- ATL – Julio Jones 5-yard pass from Matt Ryan (Younghoe Koo kick), 7:01. Tied 7–7. **Drive: 10 plays, 70 yards, 5:54.**
- ATL – Younghoe Koo 43-yard field goal, 2:36. Falcons 10–7. **Drive: 9 plays, 40 yards, 3:37.**
- SF – Robbie Gould 22-yard field goal, 0:24. Tied 10–10. **Drive: 8 plays, 71 yards, 2:12.**

**Third quarter**

- SF – Robbie Gould 46-yard field goal, 5:14. 49ers 13–10. **Drive: 6 plays, 35 yards, 4:00.**

**Fourth quarter**

- SF – Kyle Juszczyk 2-yard pass from Jimmy Garoppolo (kick failed, wide left), 10:07. 49ers 19–10. **Drive: 2 plays, 1 yard, 0:37.**
- ATL – Qadree Ollison 1-yard run (Younghoe Koo kick), 5:15. 49ers 19–17. **Drive: 9 plays, 75 yards, 4:52.**
- SF – Robbie Gould 43-yard field goal, 1:48. 49ers 22–17. **Drive: 8 plays, 50 yards, 3:27.**
- ATL – Julio Jones 5-yard pass from Matt Ryan (run failed), 0:02. Falcons 23–22. **Drive: 10 plays, 70 yards, 1:46.**
- ATL – Olamide Zaccheaus 0-yard fumble return, 0:00. Falcons 29–22.

**Top passers**

- ATL – Matt Ryan – 25/39, 210 yards, 2 TD
- SF – Jimmy Garoppolo – 22/34, 200 yards, TD

**Top rushers**

- ATL – Devonta Freeman – 12 rushes, 39 yards
- SF – Raheem Mostert – 14 rushes, 54 yards, TD

**Top receivers**

- ATL – Julio Jones – 13 receptions, 134 yards, 2 TD
- SF – George Kittle – 13 receptions, 134 yards

After a tough three-game stretch during which the 49ers became the first team in NFL history to play three straight teams with an .800 or better winning percentage, fears of a trap game loomed ahead of a matchup against an inferior Atlanta squad. Those fears were vindicated as the 49ers were sluggish on both sides of the ball for most of the game. The 49ers were missing multiple starters on defense due to injury and struggled to get off the field, allowing Atlanta to go 7-for-13 on third downs. The Falcons scored a touchdown with :02 left in the game when Julio Jones caught a pass from Matt Ryan and was tackled at the goal line by Jimmie Ward just as the football crossed the plane, to take a 23–22 lead. A fumble on the ensuing kick off due to multiple laterals gave the Falcons another 6 points as time expired. The 49ers lost all three of their games by a combined 13 points, narrowest in the NFL. With the loss, the 49ers dropped to 11–3 on the year and fell to the #5 seed in the NFC with the Seattle Seahawks victory over the Carolina Panthers. Despite the loss, they backed into a playoff berth by virtue of the Los Angeles Rams losing to the Dallas Cowboys, which also allowed the Seattle Seahawks and Green Bay Packers to clinch spots in the playoffs.

==== Week 16: vs. Los Angeles Rams ====
Week Sixteen: Los Angeles Rams at San Francisco 49ers – Game summary

Quarter	1	2	3	4	Total
Rams	7	14	7	3	**31**
**49ers**	3	21	0	10	**34**

at Levi's Stadium, Santa Clara, California

- Date: December 21
- Game time: 5:15 pm. PST
- Game weather: Cloudy, 58 °F (14 °C)
- Game attendance: 70,103
- Referee: Clete Blakeman
- TV announcers (NFLN): Kevin Burkhardt, Charles Davis and Pam Oliver
- Recap, Game Book

Game information

**First quarter**

- LAR – Brandin Cooks 10-yard pass from Jared Goff (Greg Zuerlein kick), 11:08. Rams 7–0. **Drive: 7 plays, 75 yards, 3:52.**
- SF – Robbie Gould 26-yard field goal, 8:35. Rams 7–3. **Drive: 6 plays, 10 yard, 2:23.**

**Second quarter**

- LAR – Todd Gurley 5-yard run (Greg Zuerlein kick), 14:55. Rams 14–3. **Drive: 9 plays, 63 yards, 4:01.**
- SF – Deebo Samuel 19-yard run (Robbie Gould kick), 12:06. Rams 14–10. **Drive: 5 plays, 75 yards, 2:49.**
- LAR – Todd Gurley 1-yard run (Greg Zuerlein kick), 6:47. Rams 21–10. **Drive: 11 plays, 64 yards, 5:19.**
- SF – Raheem Mostert 16-yard run (Robbie Gould kick), 2:21. Rams 21–17. **Drive: 9 plays, 75 yards, 4:26.**
- SF – Fred Warner 46-yard interception return (Robbie Gould kick), 0:46. 49ers 24–21.

**Third quarter**

- LAR – Cooper Kupp 22-yard pass from Jared Goff (Greg Zuerlein kick), 5:06. Rams 28–24. **Drive: 7 plays, 68 yards, 2:43.**

**Fourth quarter**

- SF – George Kittle 7-yard pass from Jimmy Garoppolo (Robbie Gould kick), 6:06. 49ers 31–28. **Drive: 6 plays, 91 yards, 2:48.**
- LAR – Greg Zuerlein 52-yard field goal, 2:30. Tied 31–31. **Drive: 8 plays, 41 yard, 3:36.**
- SF – Robbie Gould 33-yard field goal, 0:00. 49ers 34–31. **Drive: 9 plays, 60 yard, 2:30.**

**Top passers**

- LAR – Jared Goff – 27/46, 323 yards, 2 TD, INT
- SF – Jimmy Garoppolo – 16/27, 248 yards, TD, INT

**Top rushers**

- LAR – Todd Gurley – 15 rushes, 48 yards, 2 TD
- SF – Raheem Mostert – 11 rushes, 53 yards, TD

**Top receivers**

- LAR – Robert Woods – 8 receptions, 117 yards
- SF – George Kittle – 5 receptions, 79 yards, TD

Unlike Week 6 in which there were only 27 combined points between these teams, this game was a shootout. The Rams started out fast, with touchdowns by Brandin Cooks and Todd Gurley to give the Rams a 14–3 lead. Another touchdown by Rams running back Todd Gurley gave the Rams a 21–10 lead in the second quarter. After the 49ers cut the lead to 21–17, 49ers linebacker Fred Warner intercepted a Jared Goff pass and returned it for 46 yards for a touchdown to give the 49ers a 24–21 lead at halftime. In the second half, the 49ers offensive line struggled to protect quarterback Jimmy Garoppolo, giving up six sacks after halftime. This allowed the Rams to control the game and take a 28–24 lead. With 8:41 left in the game, Garoppolo led the 49ers on a 6 play, 91-yard drive that ended with a George Kittle seven-yard touchdown catch to give the 49ers a 31–28 lead. The defense surrendered a field goal to allow the Rams to tie the game at 31 with 2:30 left in regulation. On the following possession, in one of the most clutch performances of the season, Garoppolo led the 49ers down the field in crunch time. This included converting a third-and-16 with an 18-yard pass to receiver Kendrick Bourne, and then another third-and-16 conversion, this time a 46-yard pass to receiver Emmanuel Sanders, who was wide open due to a blown coverage to put the 49ers in field goal range. Kicker Robbie Gould won it as time expired with a 33-yard field goal, giving the 49ers the 34–31 win. This was the third time this season the 49ers trailed by double digits and came back to win the game. This was the fifth game-winning drive of the year for Garoppolo. With the close win over the Rams, the 49ers won 12 games for the first time since 2013. The 49ers swept the season series with the Rams for the first time since 2016 and regained possession of the #1 seed and the NFC West after the Cardinals upset the Seahawks.

==== Week 17: at Seattle Seahawks ====
Week Seventeen: San Francisco 49ers at Seattle Seahawks – Game summary

Quarter	1	2	3	4	Total
**49ers**	10	3	6	7	**26**
Seahawks	0	0	7	14	**21**

at CenturyLink Field, Seattle, Washington

- Date: December 29
- Game time: 5:20 pm. PST
- Game weather: Partly cloudy, 51 °F (11 °C)
- Game attendance: 69,162
- Referee: Tony Corrente
- TV announcers (NBC): Al Michaels, Cris Collinsworth, Michele Tafoya, and Terry McAulay
- Recap, Game Book

Game information

**First quarter**

- SF – Robbie Gould 47-yard field goal, 7:35. 49ers 3–0. **Drive: 10 plays, 50 yards, 6:14.**
- SF – Deebo Samuel 30-yard run (Robbie Gould kick), 0:24. 49ers 10–0. **Drive: 8 plays, 94 yards, 4:32.**

**Second quarter**

- SF – Robbie Gould 30-yard field goal, 5:44. 49ers 13–0. **Drive: 11 plays, 71 yards, 5:43.**

**Third quarter**

- SEA – Tyler Lockett 14-yard pass from Russell Wilson (Jason Myers kick), 5:46. 49ers 13–7. **Drive: 11 plays, 62 yards, 7:07.**
- SF – Raheem Mostert 2-yard run (pass failed) 3:25. 49ers 19–7. **Drive: 5 plays, 75 yards, 2:21.**

**Fourth quarter**

- SEA – Marshawn Lynch 1-yard run (Jason Myers kick), 9:55. 49ers 19–14. **Drive: 14 plays, 75 yards, 8:30.**
- SF – Raheem Mostert 13-yard run (Robbie Gold Kick) 5:51. 49ers 26–14. **Drive: 7 plays, 75 yards, 4:04.**
- SEA – DK Metcalf 14-yard pass from Russell Wilson (Jason Myers kick), 3:36. 49ers 26–21. **Drive: 7 plays, 60 yards, 2:15.**

**Top passers**

- SF – Jimmy Garoppolo – 18/22, 285 yards
- SEA – Russell Wilson – 25/40, 233 yards, 2 TD

**Top rushers**

- SF – Raheem Mostert – 10 rushes, 57 yards, 2 TD
- SEA – Travis Homer – 10 rushes, 62 yards

**Top receivers**

- SF – Deebo Samuel – 5 receptions, 102 yards
- SEA – DK Metcalf – 6 receptions, 81 yards, TD

In the 49ers' biggest game since the 2013 NFC Championship Game, they traveled to Seattle to decide not only who would win the division, but also if the 49ers could capture home-field advantage throughout the NFC playoffs. Prior to this game, the last time the 49ers had won at CenturyLink Field was on December 24, 2011. During that span, the 49ers failed to score twenty points in any of those games (going 0–7 from 2012 to 2018). In the first half, the 49ers dominated every aspect, taking a 13–0 halftime lead, aided by a Deebo Samuel 30-yard touchdown run on a pitch and catch. The 49ers also held Seattle to just 79 yards of total offense, including stuffing running back Marshawn Lynch on a fourth-and-inches attempt from the 49ers 31-yard line, causing a turnover on downs. In the second half, the Seahawks proved resilient, scoring multiple times. The Seahawks never led in this game, however, as the 49ers countered every Seahawks score with one of their own, including a Raheem Mostert 13-yard touchdown run to make it 26–14 with 5:51 left. After Seattle cut the lead to five, a questionable personal foul call against Ben Garland forced a punt, giving them the ball back with 2:27 left. They marched all the way down to the 49ers 1-yard line, but a delay of game penalty pushed them back to the 6-yard line. After three incomplete passes, the Seahawks faced fourth-and-goal. Russell Wilson hit receiver Jacob Hollister with a pass to the 49ers 1-yard line, but Hollister was stopped inches short of the goal line by linebacker Dre Greenlaw, causing a turnover on downs with nine seconds left that sealed the victory in the final game of the 2010s decade.

With the close win over the Seahawks, the 49ers snapped their seven-game losing streak at CenturyLink Field, while obtaining home-field advantage throughout the playoffs. This game also snapped the team's 22-year number one seed drought.

=== Standings ===
==== Division ====
NFC West
	W	L	T	PCT	DIV	CONF	PF	PA	STK
^{(1)} San Francisco 49ers	13	3	0	.813	5–1	10–2	479	310	W2
^{(5)} Seattle Seahawks	11	5	0	.688	3–3	8–4	405	398	L2
Los Angeles Rams	9	7	0	.563	3–3	7–5	394	364	W1
Arizona Cardinals	5	10	1	.344	1–5	3–8–1	361	442	L1

==== Conference ====
NFC
#	Team	Division	W	L	T	PCT	DIV	CONF	SOS	SOV	STK
**Division leaders**
1 (Note: San Francisco finished ahead of Green Bay and New Orleans based on head-to-head sweep, claiming the No. 1 seed.)	San Francisco 49ers	West	13	3	0	.813	5–1	10–2	.504	.466	W2
2 (Note: Green Bay claimed the No. 2 seed over New Orleans based on conference record.)	Green Bay Packers	North	13	3	0	.813	6–0	10–2	.453	.428	W5
3	New Orleans Saints	South	13	3	0	.813	5–1	9–3	.486	.459	W3
4	Philadelphia Eagles	East	9	7	0	.563	5–1	7–5	.455	.417	W4
**Wild Cards**
5	Seattle Seahawks	West	11	5	0	.688	3–3	8–4	.531	.463	L2
6	Minnesota Vikings	North	10	6	0	.625	2–4	7–5	.477	.356	L2
**Did not qualify for the postseason**
7	Los Angeles Rams	West	9	7	0	.563	3–3	7–5	.535	.438	W1
8 (Note: Chicago finished ahead of Dallas based on head-to-head victory.)	Chicago Bears	North	8	8	0	.500	4–2	7–5	.508	.383	W1
9	Dallas Cowboys	East	8	8	0	.500	5–1	7–5	.479	.316	W1
10 (Note: Atlanta finished ahead of Tampa Bay based on division record.)	Atlanta Falcons	South	7	9	0	.438	4–2	6–6	.545	.518	W4
11	Tampa Bay Buccaneers	South	7	9	0	.438	2–4	5–7	.500	.384	L2
12	Arizona Cardinals	West	5	10	1	.344	1–5	3–8–1	.529	.375	L1
13	Carolina Panthers	South	5	11	0	.313	1–5	2–10	.549	.469	L8
14	New York Giants	East	4	12	0	.250	2–4	3–9	.473	.281	L1
15	Detroit Lions	North	3	12	1	.219	0–6	2–9–1	.506	.375	L9
16	Washington Redskins	East	3	13	0	.188	0–6	2–10	.502	.281	L4
**Tiebreakers** (Note: When breaking ties for three or more teams under the NFL's rules, they are first broken within divisions, then comparing only the highest-ranked remaining team from each division.)

== Postseason ==
=== Schedule ===
Round	Date	Opponent (seed)	Result	Record	Venue	Recap
Wild Card	First-round bye					
Divisional	January 11, 2020	Minnesota Vikings (6)	W 27–10	1–0	Levi's Stadium	Recap
NFC Championship	January 19, 2020	Green Bay Packers (2)	W 37–20	2–0	Levi's Stadium	Recap
Super Bowl LIV	February 2, 2020	vs. Kansas City Chiefs (A2)	L 20–31	2–1	Hard Rock Stadium	Recap

=== Game summaries ===
==== NFC Divisional Playoffs: vs. (6) Minnesota Vikings ====
NFC Divisional Playoffs: (6) Minnesota Vikings at (1) San Francisco 49ers – Game summary

Quarter	1	2	3	4	Total
Vikings	7	3	0	0	10
49ers	7	7	10	3	27

at Levi's Stadium, Santa Clara, California

- Date: January 11, 2020
- Game time: 1:35 p.m. PST
- Game weather: Partly cloudy, 56 °F (13 °C)
- Game attendance: 71,649
- Referee: Walt Anderson
- TV announcers (NBC): Al Michaels, Cris Collinsworth, Michele Tafoya and Terry McAulay
- Recap, Game Book

Game information

First quarter

- SF – Kendrick Bourne 3-yard pass from Jimmy Garoppolo (Robbie Gould kick), 9:30. 49ers 7–0. Drive: 8 plays, 61 yards, 4:11.
- MIN – Stefon Diggs 41-yard pass from Kirk Cousins (Dan Bailey kick), 5:23. Tied 7–7. Drive: 7 plays, 79 yards, 4:07.

Second quarter

- SF – Tevin Coleman 1-yard run (Robbie Gould kick), 7:10. 49ers 14–7. Drive: 10 plays, 53 yards, 5:35.
- MIN – Dan Bailey 39-yard field goal, 0:31. 49ers 14–10. Drive: 6 plays, 8 yards, 2:10.

Third quarter

- SF – Robbie Gould 35-yard field goal, 10:42. 49ers 17–10. Drive: 9 plays, 46 yards, 4:18.
- SF – Tevin Coleman 2-yard run (Robbie Gould kick), 4:54. 49ers 24–10. Drive: 8 plays, 44 yards, 4:55.

Fourth quarter

- SF – Robbie Gould 21-yard field goal, 14:13. 49ers 27–10. Drive: 4 plays, 7 yards, 1:52.

Top passers

- MIN – Kirk Cousins – 21/29, 172 yards, TD, INT
- SF – Jimmy Garoppolo – 11/19, 131 yards, TD, INT

Top rushers

- MIN – Dalvin Cook – 9 rushes, 18 yards
- SF – Tevin Coleman – 22 rushes, 105 yards, 2 TD

Top receivers

- MIN – Stefon Diggs – 2 receptions, 57 yards, TD
- SF – Deebo Samuel – 3 receptions, 42 yards

In the first playoff game at Levi's Stadium for the 49ers, they hosted the Minnesota Vikings for the first time since 1997. After winning the coin toss and deferring, they had a great start, forcing a three-and-out on the Vikings offense. They then proceeded to march 61 yards on just eight plays, culminating in a 3-yard touchdown pass from Jimmy Garoppolo to Kendrick Bourne to take a 7–0 lead. Garoppolo went 5-for-6 passing for 49 yards on that drive, silencing criticisms that he might be rattled in his first playoff game. The Vikings tied the game on a 41-yard touchdown pass from Kirk Cousins to Stefon Diggs on their ensuing possession. Later in the game, another three-and-out by the Vikings set the 49ers up with good field position, finished off by a Tevin Coleman 1-yard touchdown run to retake the lead, 14–7. Before halftime, Garoppolo threw an interception to Eric Kendricks to put the Vikings deep in 49ers territory, but the 49ers defense stood tall, forcing the Vikings to kick a field goal, sending the game into halftime with the 49ers leading 14–10. 49ers lead their NFC rival Packers in the NFC Championship Game 37-20. But lost to the Kansas City Chiefs in Super Bowl LIV 31-20.

From there, the 49ers completely dominated the second half, taking a 17–10 lead after a 35-yard Robbie Gould field goal on their opening possession after halftime. Partway through the third quarter, 49ers cornerback Richard Sherman intercepted a pass from Cousins, giving the 49ers great field position at the Vikings 44-yard line. The 49ers went 44 yards on eight successive run plays, and finishing the drive with a 2-yard touchdown run from Coleman to give the 49ers a 24–10 lead. For the rest of the game, the 49ers defense controlled the line of scrimmage and kept the Vikings off the board to give the 49ers their first playoff win since 2013.

The 49ers defense finished the game with six sacks and two forced turnovers, and surrendered just 147 total yards of offense. The Vikings earned just seven first downs on the day and had only 21 rushing yards, the fewest the 49ers had ever given up in a playoff game. On offense, the 49ers rushed for 186 yards on the day, more than the entire Vikings offense managed in the game. 49ers win to their NFC rival Packers in the NFC Championship Game 37-20. But lost to Patrick Mahomes in Super Bowl LIV 31-20.

==== NFC Championship: vs. (2) Green Bay Packers ====
NFC Championship: (2) Green Bay Packers at (1) San Francisco 49ers – Game summary

Quarter	1	2	3	4	Total
Packers	0	0	7	13	20
49ers	7	20	7	3	37

at Levi's Stadium, Santa Clara, California

- Date: January 19, 2020
- Game time: 3:40 p.m. PST
- Game weather: Cloudy, 58 °F (14 °C)
- Game attendance: 72,211
- Referee: John Hussey
- TV announcers (Fox): Joe Buck, Troy Aikman, Erin Andrews, Chris Myers and Mike Pereira
- Recap, Game Book

Game information

First quarter

- SF – Raheem Mostert 36-yard run (Robbie Gould kick), 5:55. 49ers 7–0. Drive: 6 plays, 89 yards, 3:38.

Second quarter

- SF – Robbie Gould 54-yard field goal, 14:55. 49ers 10–0. Drive: 5 plays, 15 yards, 2:21.
- SF – Raheem Mostert 9-yard run (Robbie Gould kick), 9:12. 49ers 17–0. Drive: 6 plays, 37 yards, 3:20.
- SF – Robbie Gould 27-yard field goal, 1:57. 49ers 20–0. Drive: 8 plays, 66 yards, 3:42.
- SF – Raheem Mostert 18-yard run (Robbie Gould kick), 0:45. 49ers 27–0. Drive: 3 plays, 30 yards, 0:16.

Third quarter

- GB – Aaron Jones 9-yard pass from Aaron Rodgers (Mason Crosby kick), 8:44. 49ers 27–7. Drive: 11 plays, 75 yards, 6:16.
- SF – Raheem Mostert 22-yard run (Robbie Gould kick), 4:49. 49ers 34–7. Drive: 7 plays, 79 yards, 3:55.

Fourth quarter

- GB – Aaron Jones 1-yard run (pass failed), 14:35. 49ers 34–13. Drive: 10 plays, 75 yards, 5:14.
- GB – Jace Sternberger 8-yard pass from Aaron Rodgers (Mason Crosby kick), 8:13. 49ers 34–20. Drive: 7 plays, 92 yards, 3:12.
- SF – Robbie Gould 42-yard field goal, 3:31. 49ers 37–20. Drive: 10 plays, 49 yards, 4:42.

Top passers

- GB – Aaron Rodgers – 31/39, 326 yards, 2 TD, 2 INT
- SF – Jimmy Garoppolo – 6/8, 77 yards

Top rushers

- GB – Aaron Jones – 12 rushes, 56 yards, TD
- SF – Raheem Mostert – 29 rushes, 220 yards, 4 TD

Top receivers

- GB – Davante Adams – 9 receptions, 138 yards
- SF – Deebo Samuel – 2 receptions, 46 yards

The 49ers hosted the NFC Championship game for the first time since 2011. 49ers went on to Super Bowl LIV but lost to the Chiefs 31-20.

==== Super Bowl LIV: vs. (A2) Kansas City Chiefs ====
Super Bowl LIV: (N1) San Francisco 49ers vs. (A2) Kansas City Chiefs – Game summary

Quarter	1	2	3	4	Total
49ers	3	7	10	0	20
Chiefs	7	3	0	21	31

at Hard Rock Stadium, Miami, Florida

- Date: February 2, 2020
- Game time: 6:30 p.m. EST/3:30 pm. PST
- Game weather: 64 °F (18 °C)
- Game attendance: 62,417
- Referee: Bill Vinovich
- TV announcers (Fox): Joe Buck, Troy Aikman, Erin Andrews, Chris Myers and Mike Pereira
- Recap, Game Book

Game information

First quarter

- SF – Robbie Gould 38-yard field goal, 7:57. 49ers 3–0. Drive: 10 plays, 62 yards, 5:58.
- KC – Patrick Mahomes 1-yard run (Harrison Butker kick), 0:31. Chiefs 7–3. Drive: 15 plays, 75 yards, 7:26.

Second quarter

- KC – Harrison Butker 31-yard field goal, 9:32. Chiefs 10–3. Drive: 9 plays, 43 yards, 4:36.
- SF – Kyle Juszczyk 15-yard pass from Jimmy Garoppolo (Robbie Gould kick), 5:05. Tied 10–10. Drive: 7 plays, 80 yards, 4:27.

Third quarter

- SF – Robbie Gould 42-yard field goal, 9:29. 49ers 13–10. Drive: 9 plays, 60 yards, 5:31.'
- SF – Raheem Mostert 1-yard run (Robbie Gould kick), 2:35. 49ers 20–10. Drive: 5 plays, 55 yards, 2:48.

Fourth quarter

- KC – Travis Kelce 1-yard pass from Patrick Mahomes (Harrison Butker kick), 6:13. 49ers 20–17. Drive: 10 plays, 83 yards, 2:40.
- KC – Damien Williams 5-yard pass from Patrick Mahomes (Harrison Butker kick), 2:44. Chiefs 24–20. Drive: 5 plays, 55 yards, 2:48.
- KC – Damien Williams 38-yard run (Harrison Butker kick), 1:12. Chiefs 31–20. Drive: 2 plays, 42 yards, 0:13.

Top passers

- SF – Jimmy Garoppolo – 20/31, 219 yards, TD, 2 INT
- KC – Patrick Mahomes – 26/42, 286 yards, 2 TD, 2 INT

Top rushers

- SF – Raheem Mostert – 12 rushes, 58 yards, TD
- KC – Damien Williams – 17 rushes, 104 yards, TD

Top receivers

- SF – Deebo Samuel – 5 receptions, 39 yards
- KC – Tyreek Hill – 9 receptions, 105 yards

49ers 2019 season come to an end and in 2020 missed the playoffs 6-10.
