= 2018 Virginia Cavaliers football team =

American college football season

2018 Virginia Cavaliers football

Belk Bowl champion

Belk Bowl, W 28–0 vs. South Carolina
- Conference: Atlantic Coast Conference
- Coastal DivisionCo-def
- Record: 8–5 (4–4 ACC)
- Head coach: Bronco Mendenhall (3rd season)
- Offensive coordinator: Robert Anae (3rd season)
- Offensive scheme: Multiple
- Defensive coordinator: Nick Howell (3rd season)
- Co-defensive coordinator: Kelly Poppinga (1st season)
- Base defense: 3–4
- Home stadium: Scott Stadium

Uniform
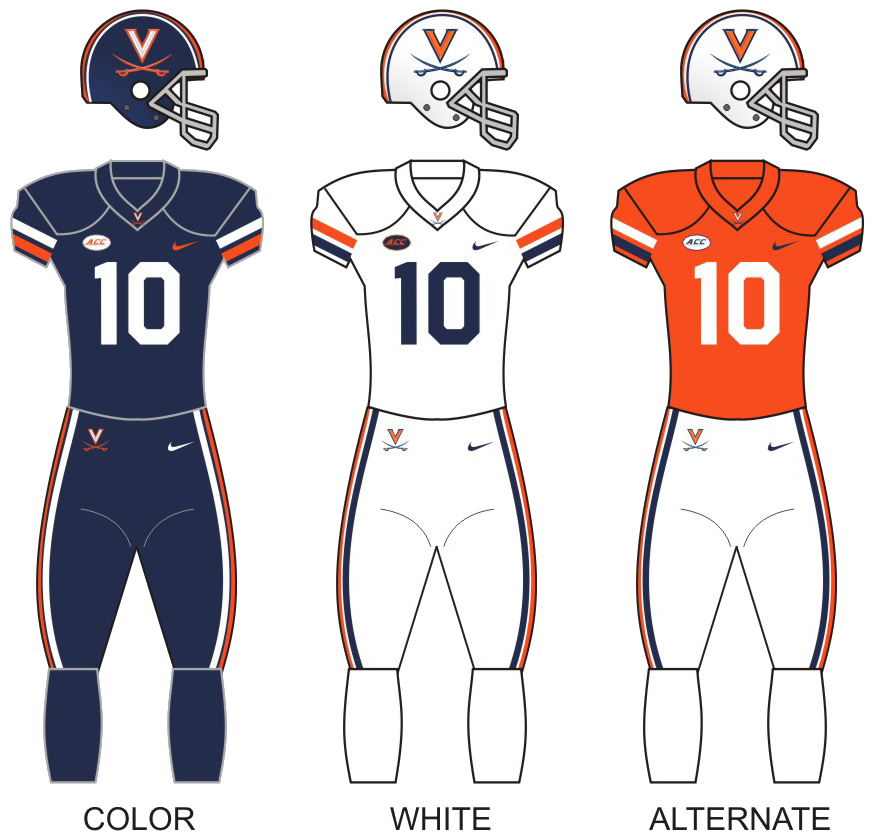

2018 Atlantic Coast Conference football standings
	Conf.			Overall
Team	W		L	W		L
Atlantic Division
No. 1 Clemson x$#^	8	–	0	15	–	0
No. 15 Syracuse	6	–	2	10	–	3
NC State	5	–	3	9	–	4
Boston College	4	–	4	7	–	5
Wake Forest	3	–	5	7	–	6
Florida State	3	–	5	5	–	7
Louisville	0	–	8	2	–	10
Coastal Division
Pittsburgh x	6	–	2	7	–	7
Georgia Tech	5	–	3	7	–	6
Miami (FL)	4	–	4	7	–	6
Virginia	4	–	4	8	–	5
Virginia Tech	4	–	4	6	–	7
Duke	3	–	5	8	–	5
North Carolina	1	–	7	2	–	9
Championship: Clemson 42, Pittsburgh 10
# – College Football Playoff champion; ^ – College Football Playoff participant; $ – Conference champion; x – Division champion/co-champions; Rankings from AP Poll

The 2018 Virginia Cavaliers football team represented the University of Virginia during the 2018 NCAA Division I FBS football season. The Cavaliers were led by third-year head coach Bronco Mendenhall and played their home games at Scott Stadium. They competed as a member of the Coastal Division of the Atlantic Coast Conference (ACC).

== Previous season ==
Virginia ended the 2017 season with a 6–7 overall record, 3–5 in the ACC, to finish in a tie for fourth place in the ACC Coastal Division. They were invited to the Military Bowl, where they were defeated by Navy.

== Preseason ==
=== Award watch lists ===
Listed in the order that they were released

Award	Player	Position	Year
Chuck Bednarik Award	Juan Thornhill	S	SR
Fred Biletnikoff Award	Olamide Zaccheaus	RB	SR
Bronko Nagurski Trophy	Juan Thornhill	S	SR
Paul Hornung Award	Joe Reed	WR/KR	JR
Johnny Unitas Golden Arm Award	Bryce Perkins	QB	JR

=== ACC media poll ===
The ACC media poll was released on July 24, 2018.

Media poll (Coastal)
Predicted finish	Team	Votes (1st place)
1	Miami	998 (122)
2	Virginia Tech	838 (16)
3	Georgia Tech	654 (8)
4	Duke	607 (1)
5	Pittsburgh	420
6	North Carolina	370 (1)
7	Virginia	257

== Schedule ==
Date	Time	Opponent	Rank	Site	TV	Result	Attendance
September 1	6:00 p.m.	Richmond*		Scott Stadium; Charlottesville, VA	ACCN Extra	W 42–13	40,524
September 8	7:30 p.m.	at Indiana*		Memorial Stadium; Bloomington, IN	BTN	L 16–20	35,492
September 15	4:15 p.m.	vs. Ohio*		Vanderbilt Stadium; Nashville, TN (Note: Moved from Scott Stadium in anticipation of Hurricane Florence.)	ESPN2	W 45–31	5,438
September 22	12:30 p.m.	Louisville		Scott Stadium; Charlottesville, VA	ACCRSN	W 27–3	34,446
September 29	12:20 p.m.	at NC State		Carter–Finley Stadium; Raleigh, NC	Raycom	L 21–35	57,600
October 13	7:00 p.m.	No. 16 Miami (FL)^{†}		Scott Stadium; Charlottesville, VA	ESPN2	W 16–13	42,393
October 20	12:30 p.m.	at Duke		Wallace Wade Stadium; Durham, NC	ACCRSN	W 28–14	20,277
October 27	12:20 p.m.	North Carolina		Scott Stadium; Charlottesville, VA (South's Oldest Rivalry)	Raycom	W 31–21	43,000
November 2	7:30 p.m.	Pittsburgh	No. 25	Scott Stadium; Charlottesville, VA	ESPN2	L 13–23	36,256
November 10	3:00 p.m.	Liberty*		Scott Stadium; Charlottesville, VA	ACCRSN	W 45–24	41,485
November 17	3:30 p.m.	at Georgia Tech		Bobby Dodd Stadium; Atlanta, GA	ACCRSN	L 27–30 ^{OT}	37,543
November 23	3:30 p.m.	at Virginia Tech		Lane Stadium; Blacksburg, VA (Commonwealth Cup)	ABC	L 31–34 ^{OT}	60,776
December 29	12:00 p.m.	vs. South Carolina*		Bank of America Stadium; Charlotte, NC (Belk Bowl)	ABC	W 28–0	48,263
*Non-conference game; ^{†}Homecoming; Rankings from AP Poll and CFP Rankings after October 30 released prior to game; All times are in Eastern time

== Roster ==
2018 Virginia Cavaliers football team roster
Players
Coaches
Offense

Pos.	#	Name	Class
C	63	Tyler Fannin	Fr
C, G	77	Jake Fieler	Sr
FB		Dylan Crawford	Fr
FB	10	Jamari Peacock	So
FB	90	Andrew Yavinsky	RFr
HB	80	Billy Kemp	Fr
HB	4	Olamide Zaccheaus	Sr
G	65	Ben Knutson	So
G	78	R.J. Proctor	Jr
OL, LS		Daniel Moore	Fr
OL	71	Marcus Applefield	Sr
OL		Joe Bissinger	Fr
OL	67	Derek Devine	Fr
OL	70	Bobby Haskins	Fr
OL		Jack Keenan	Fr
OL		Micah Mariteragi	Fr
OL		Victor Oluwatimi	RFr
OL	53	Gerrik Vollmer	RFr
OL	66	Martin Weisz	Fr
OT	54	Ryan Nelson	RFr
OT	64	Ben Trent	So
OT	69	Chris Glaser	So
OT	79	Dillon Reinkensmeyer	So
OT	72	Ryan Swoboda	RFr
OT	74	Ryan Bischoff	Jr
QB, LS	99	Joe Spaziani	Sr
QB	98	Brennan Armstrong	Fr
QB		Tristan Hillerich	RFr
QB		T.J. Kitts	RFr
QB		DaJuan Moore	Fr
QB	3	Bryce Perkins	Jr
QB	36	Lindell Stone	So
RB	75	Webster Hill IV	Fr
RB		Chris Jones	Fr
RB	92	Perris Jones	Fr
RB	88	Justin Zollar	Jr
TB	25	Lamont Atkins	So
TB	1	Jordan Ellis	Sr
TB	6	PK Kier	So
TB	31	Chris Sharp	Jr
TB		Wayne Taulapapa	Fr
TE	46	Evan Butts	Sr
TE	44	Tanner Cowley	Jr
WR	85	Cole Blackman	So
WR	82	Riah Burton	RFr
WR	19	Chuck Davis	So
WR	8	Hasise Dubois	Jr
WR		Shane Eilers	RFr
WR	86	Ross Gardner	Sr
WR	18	Ben Hogg	Sr
WR	84	Terrell Jana	So
WR	27	Tavares Kelly	Fr
WR		Zain Khokhar	Sr
WR	83	Hayden Mitchell	RFr
WR	86	Ugo Obasi	Fr
WR		Darnell Pratt	RFr
WR	2	Joe Reed	Jr
WR		Wooby Theork-Youmans	Fr
WR		Brandon White	Fr

Defense

Pos.	#	Name	Class
CB		Jaylon Baker	Fr
CB		Mark Chichester	Fr
CB	41	Germane Crowell (injured)	RFr
CB	20	Nick Grant	So
CB	34	Bryce Hall	Jr
CB	5	Tim Harris	Sr
CB	30	Myles Robinson	Jr
DB	32	Darrius Bratton	So
DB, WR		Josh Clifford	Fr
DB, WR	15	De'Vante Cross	So
DB	14	Donovan Rolle	RFr
DB	23	Shawn Smith	RFr
DB	93	Joseph White	Fr
DE	16	Richard Burney	Jr
DE	91	Mandy Alonso	So
DE	88	Osiris Crutchfield	So
DL	61	Isaac Buell	RFr
DL	50	Tommy Christ	RFr
DL	94	Aaron Faumui	Fr
DL	76	Jordan Redmond	Fr
DL	62	Samson Reed	Fr
DL		Christian Smith	Fr
DL		Trevor Storm	Fr
DL		Dylan Thompson	Fr
DT	58	Eli Hanback	Jr
FS	28	Brenton Nelson	So
FS	29	Joey Blount	So
ILB		Parker Chenault	Fr
ILB	17	Malcolm Cook (injured)	Sr
ILB	45	Reed Kellam	Jr
ILB	37	Jordan Mack	Jr
ILB	55	Mikey McDonald	Sr
ILB	9	Dominic Sheppard (injured)	Jr
ILB	22	Robert Snyder	So
ILB	40	C.J. Stalker	Sr
LB		Evan Clark	Fr
LB	51	Javar Garrett	Fr
LB	57	T.C. Harrison	Fr
LB	52	Grant Misch	Fr
LB	33	Zane Zandier	So
OLB	43	Elliott Brown	So
OLB	59	Dre Bryant	So
OLB	60	Colin Dixon	RFr
OLB	56	Matt Gahm	So
OLB	38	Gladimir Paul	Jr
OLB	13	Chris Peace	Sr
OLB, FS	7	Chris Moore (injured)	Jr
OLB	11	Charles Snowden	So
OLB	42	Noah Taylor	Fr
S		Darren Klein	Fr
S	96	Cole Lytle	Fr
S		Vinnie Vladic	Fr
SS	21	Juan Thornhill	Sr
SS	39	CJ Epps	Jr

Special teams

Pos.	#	Name	Class
K		Jack Collins	Fr
K	26	Brian Delaney	So
PK	95	A.J. Mejia	So
PK	89	Hunter Pearson	Fr
P	47	Lester Coleman	Sr
PK, P	81	Nash Griffin	So
PK, P		Jerry Horng	Fr
LS		Lee Dudley	Fr
LS		Tucker Finkelston	Fr

Head coach

- Bronco Mendenhall (Oregon State)

Coordinators/assistant coaches

- Robert Anae (BYU)
  Offensive coordinator, inside receivers
- Marques Hagans (Virginia)
  Wide receivers
- Mark Atuaia (BYU)
  Running backs
- Garett Tujague (BYU)
  Offensive line
- Jason Beck (BYU)
  Quarterbacks
- Vic So'oto (BYU)
  Defensive line
- Nick Howell (Weber State)
  Defensive coordinator, secondary
- Kelly Poppinga (BYU)
  Co-defensive coordinator, outside linebackers
- Shane Hunter (BYU)
  Inside linebackers
- Rickey Brumfield (Utah State)
  Special teams coordinator
- Patrick Hickman (BYU)
  Director of football operations
- Justin Anderson (BYU)
  Director of player personnel
- Shawn Griswold (Utah State)
  Director of football training & player development
- Matt Edwards (BYU)
  Football analyst
- Krik Garner (Virginia)
  Graduate assistant
- Matt Johns (Virginia)
  Graduate assistant
- Jackson Matteo (Virginia)
  Graduate assistant
- Andrew Meyer (Wisconsin)
  Graduate assistant

Legend

- (C) Team captain
- (S) Suspended
- (I) Ineligible
- Injured
- Redshirt

Roster
Last update: 2018-07-27

=== Depth chart ===
Defense

FS
Joey Blount
De'Vante Cross
⋅

WLB	BLB	MLB	SLB
Chris Peace	Malcolm Cook	Jordan Mack	Charles Snowden
Matt Gahm	Rob Snyder	Zane Zandier	Elliott Brown
⋅	C.J. Stalker	⋅	Noah Taylor

SABRE
Juan Thornhill
Brenton Nelson
⋅

CB
Tim Harris
Darrius Bratton
⋅

DE	NT	DE
Mandy Alonso	Eli Hanback	Aaron Faumui
Aaron Faumui	Jordan Redmond	Tommy Christ
⋅	Dylan Thompson	⋅

CB
Bryce Hall
Nick Grant
⋅

Offense

WR (X)
Joe Reed
Ben Hogg
Cole Blackman

WR
Olamide Zaccheaus
Tavares Kelly
Chuck Davis

LT	LG	C	RG	RT
Ryan Nelson	R.J. Proctor	Dillon Reinkensmeyer	Jake Fieler	Marcus Appliefield
Bobby Haskins	Chris Glaser	Gerrik Vollmer	Ben Knutson	Ryan Swoboda
⋅	⋅	⋅	⋅	⋅

TE
Evan Butts
Tanner Cowley
⋅

WR (Y)
Hasise Dubois
Terrell Jana
Ugo Obasi

QB
Bryce Perkins
Brennan Armstrong
Lindell Stone

Key reserves
KO Brian Delaney
BB Jamari Peacock
BB Chris Sharp

RB
Jordan Ellis
PK Kier
Lamont Atkins

Special teams
PK Brian Delaney
PK Hunter Pearson
P Lester Coleman
KR Joe Reed
KR PK Kier
PR Chuck Davis
PR Tavares Kelly
LS Joe Spaziani
H Nash Griffin

== Game summaries ==
=== Richmond ===
	1	2	3	4	Total
Spiders	10	0	3	0	13
Cavaliers	14	14	7	7	42

=== At Indiana ===
	1	2	3	4	Total
Cavaliers	9	0	7	0	16
Hoosiers	13	7	0	0	20

=== vs Ohio ===
	1	2	3	4	Total
Bobcats	7	14	7	3	31
Cavaliers	21	17	0	7	45

=== Louisville ===
	1	2	3	4	Total
Cardinals	0	0	3	0	3
Cavaliers	0	6	7	14	27

=== At NC State ===
	1	2	3	4	Total
Cavaliers	7	0	7	7	21
Wolfpack	3	17	7	8	35

=== Miami (FL) ===
	1	2	3	4	Total
No. 16 Hurricanes	0	6	0	7	13
Cavaliers	0	13	0	3	16

=== At Duke ===
	1	2	3	4	Total
Cavaliers	7	7	6	8	28
Blue Devils	0	0	7	7	14

=== North Carolina ===
	1	2	3	4	Total
Tar Heels	7	7	0	7	21
Cavaliers	14	3	7	7	31

=== Pittsburgh ===
	1	2	3	4	Total
Panthers	7	0	7	9	23
No. 23 Cavaliers	7	3	0	3	13

=== Liberty ===
	1	2	3	4	Total
Flames	7	10	7	0	24
Cavaliers	14	10	14	7	45

=== At Georgia Tech ===
	1	2	3	4	OT	Total
Cavaliers	14	7	0	6	0	27
Yellow Jackets	13	3	0	11	3	30

=== At Virginia Tech ===
	1	2	3	4	OT	Total
Cavaliers	0	0	14	17	0	31
Hokies	0	14	3	14	3	34

=== Vs. South Carolina (Belk Bowl) ===
	1	2	3	4	Total
Gamecocks	0	0	0	0	0
Cavaliers	7	7	7	7	28

== Rankings ==
Ranking movements Legend: ██ Increase in ranking ██ Decrease in ranking — = Not ranked RV = Received votes
	Week															
Poll	Pre	1	2	3	4	5	6	7	8	9	10	11	12	13	14	Final
AP	—	—	—	—	—	—	—	RV	RV	23	—	—	—	—	—	
Coaches	—	—	—	—	RV	—	—	RV	RV	22	—	RV	RV	—	—	
CFP	Not released									25	—	—	—	—	—	Not released

== 2019 NFL draft ==
Round	Pick	Player	Position	NFL Club
2	63	Juan Thornhill	S	Kansas City Chiefs
6	198	Tim Harris	CB	San Francisco 49ers
