= Deebo Samuel =

American football player (born 1996)

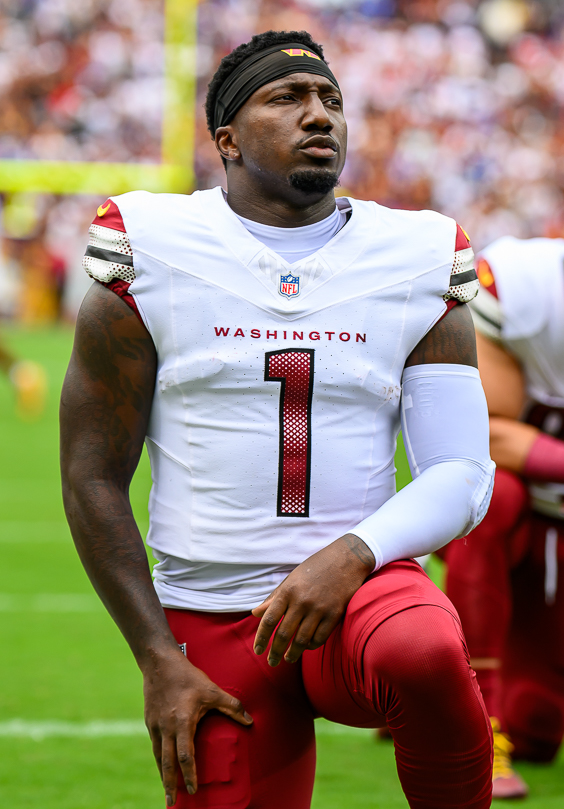
- Samuel with the Washington Commanders in 2025

No. 19 – San Francisco 49ers
- Positions: Wide receiver, kick returner
- Roster status: Active

Personal information
- Born: January 15, 1996 (age 30); Inman, South Carolina, U.S.
- Listed height: 6 ft 0 in (1.83 m)
- Listed weight: 215 lb (98 kg)

Career information
- High school: Chapman (Inman)
- College: South Carolina (2014–2018)
- NFL draft: 2019: 2nd round, 36th overall pick

Career history
- San Francisco 49ers (2019–2024); Washington Commanders (2025); San Francisco 49ers (2026–present)

Awards and highlights
- First-team All-Pro (2021); Pro Bowl (2021); First-team All-American (2018)

Career NFL statistics as of Week 10, 2026
- Receptions: 425
- Receiving yards: 5,756
- Receiving touchdowns: 31
- Rushing yards: 1,374
- Rushing average: 5.9
- Rushing touchdowns: 22
- Stats at Pro Football Reference

Tyshun Raequan "Deebo" Samuel Sr. (born January 15, 1996) is an American professional football wide receiver and kick returner for the San Francisco 49ers of the National Football League (NFL). He played college football for the South Carolina Gamecocks, earning first-team All-American honors in 2018. Samuel was selected by the 49ers in the second round of the 2019 NFL draft. With San Francisco, Samuel received Pro Bowl and first-team All-Pro honors in 2021 after leading the league in average receiving yards. He was traded in 2025 to the Washington Commanders before rejoining the 49ers the following year. Samuel holds the NFL record for rushing touchdowns by a wide receiver and is the only wide receiver in league history to have at least 20 receiving and 20 rushing touchdowns.

== Early life ==
Samuel played football at Chapman High School in Inman, South Carolina. As a senior, he led his team to the semifinals of the AAA playoffs. During his career, Samuel had 166 catches for 2,751 yards and 36 touchdowns; he rushed 133 times for 898 yards and 13 touchdowns. He finished with a school-record 53 career touchdowns, 94 tackles and 12 interceptions. He won the High School Sports Report Class AAA Offensive Player of the Year, and played in the Shrine Bowl of the Carolinas, a high-school all-star game with players from North and South Carolina.

Coming out of high school, Samuel was rated as a three-star recruit in the 2014 college football recruiting class. He committed to the University of South Carolina to play college football for the Gamecocks over offers from Appalachian State, Charlotte, East Carolina, Maryland, NC State, North Carolina, Old Dominion, and Vanderbilt.

== College career ==
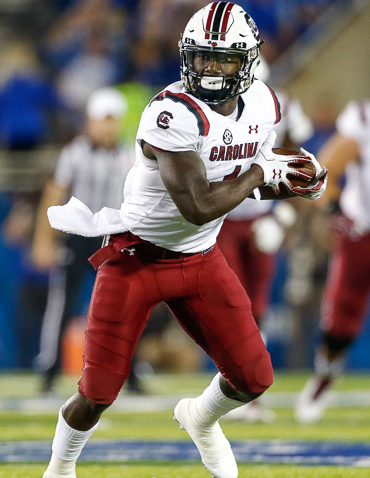
Samuel with the South Carolina Gamecocks in 2018

=== 2014 season ===
Samuel redshirted in his true freshman year of 2014.

=== 2015 season ===
Samuel played in five games, making three starts while struggling with injuries. He suffered a hamstring injury in the season opener against North Carolina. Samuel finished the season with 12 receptions for 161 yards.

=== 2016 season ===
In his sophomore season, Samuel played in 10 games, led the team with 59 receptions for 783 yards, and rushed 15 times for 98 yards and six touchdowns. In the Birmingham Bowl against USF, he had 14 receptions for 190 receiving yards.

=== 2017 season ===
In the first game of the season against NC State, Samuel returned the opening kickoff for a touchdown and had five catches for 83 yards for two touchdowns. In Week 2 against Missouri, Samuel once again returned a kickoff for a touchdown, and finished with five catches for 45 yards, and also ran the ball two times for 30 yards and a touchdown. In Week 3 against Kentucky, on the first play from scrimmage Samuel caught a 68-yard touchdown pass from Gamecock quarterback Jake Bentley. After suffering a season-ending injury later in the game, Samuel would finish the season having not even played three full games, yet accumulated 250 yards receiving for three touchdowns, two carries for 30 yards and a touchdown, and two kickoff returns for two touchdowns for a combined 194 yards.

==== Injury ====
In Week 3 against Kentucky, with 2:27 left in the third quarter, Samuel caught a pass from Jake Bentley and was awkwardly tackled by Derrick Baity Jr. of Kentucky, bending his leg back. It was announced after the game by head coach Will Muschamp that Samuel had broken his right fibula and would miss the rest of the season. Despite the injury, it was announced that Samuel could possibly return later on in the season, but during his rehab he suffered a sprained foot and would not return.

=== 2018 season ===
On November 5, 2017, Samuel announced that he would be returning for his senior season. Samuel finished the 2018 season with 882 yards receiving and 11 touchdowns. His best game of the season came against Clemson, where he caught 10 passes for 210 yards and three touchdowns. He chose not to play in the Gamecocks' bowl game, the 2018 Belk Bowl. He was later selected to play in the 2019 Senior Bowl.

== Professional career ==
Pre-draft measurables
Height	Weight	Arm length	Hand span	Wingspan	40-yard dash	10-yard split	20-yard split	20-yard shuttle	Three-cone drill	Vertical jump	Broad jump	Bench press
5 ft 11 1/4 in (1.81 m)	214 lb (97 kg)	31 3/8 in (0.80 m)	10 in (0.25 m)	6 ft 3 1/8 in (1.91 m)	4.48 s	1.48 s	2.66 s	4.14 s	7.03 s	39.0 in (0.99 m)	10 ft 2 in (3.10 m)	15 reps
All values from NFL Combine

=== San Francisco 49ers (first stint) ===
==== 2019 season ====
Samuel was selected by the San Francisco 49ers in the second round (36th overall) of the 2019 NFL draft. He signed a four-year contract with the 49ers on July 25, 2019.

Samuel made his NFL debut against the Tampa Bay Buccaneers, catching three passes for 17 yards and losing a fumble in the 31–17 road victory. In the next game against the Cincinnati Bengals, he caught five passes for 87 yards and his first NFL touchdown as the 49ers won on the road by a score of 41–17. During Week 8 against the Carolina Panthers, Samuel caught three passes for 19 yards and rushed for 29 yards and a touchdown in a 51–13 victory. Two weeks later against the Seattle Seahawks on Monday Night Football, he caught eight passes for 112 yards in the 27–24 overtime loss. In the next game against the Arizona Cardinals, Samuel caught eight passes for 134 yards in the 36–26 victory. Samuel would have two more touchdown catches over the next two games against the Green Bay Packers and Baltimore Ravens, and would add another rushing score in the Week 16 contest against the Los Angeles Rams. In the regular-season finale against the Seahawks on Sunday Night Football, he caught five passes for 102 yards and rushed twice for 33 yards and a touchdown in the 26–21 road victory.

During Super Bowl LIV against the Kansas City Chiefs, Samuel rushed twice for 53 yards and caught five passes for 39 yards during the 31–20 loss. His 53 rushing yards was the most by a wide receiver in Super Bowl history.

==== 2020 season ====
Samuel was placed on the non-football injury list at the start of training camp on July 28, 2020. He was activated on September 5, but was placed on injured reserve on September 12. He was activated on October 3. He was placed on the reserve/COVID-19 list by the team on November 4, and activated two days later. In Week 12 against the Rams, he had 11 receptions for 133 receiving yards in the 23–20 victory. Samuel finished the 2020 season with 33 receptions for 391 receiving yards and one receiving touchdown.

==== 2021 season ====
During the season-opening 41–33 road victory over the Detroit Lions, Samuel caught nine passes for 189 yards and a touchdown. In Week 8, Samuel had six catches for 171 yards in a 33–22 win over the Bears, earning NFC Offensive Player of the Week. In Week 10, Samuel had five catches for 97 yards and five carries for 36 yards and two total touchdowns in a 31–10 win over the Rams, earning his second NFC Offensive Player of the Week honor of the season.

Over the course of the season, the 49ers increasingly lined Samuel up in the backfield like a traditional running back, roughly 11% of the time, in order to get the ball in his hands more often and take advantage of his play-making ability. Samuel was elected to the Pro Bowl for 2021. Throughout the season, Samuel had more rushing touchdowns of 10+ yards (6) than 23 NFL teams, He also holds the record for the most rushing touchdowns in a single season by a wide receiver in NFL history, with 8. In a must-win Week 18 matchup against the Los Angeles Rams, Samuel threw a 24-yard touchdown pass, ran for a 16-yard touchdown, and totaled 164 yards. Through the air, Samuel finished the regular season with 77 receptions for 1,405 receiving yards and six receiving touchdowns. On the ground, Samuel finished with 59 rushing attempts for 365 rushing yards and eight rushing touchdowns, the most ever by a wide receiver in a season. Samuel also threw for a touchdown. He was named as a first-team All-Pro.

Against the Dallas Cowboys in the Wild Card Round, Samuel caught three passes for 38 yards, and rushed for 72 yards and a touchdown off ten attempts in the 23–17 win.

At the 2022 Pro Bowl, Samuel coined the term "wide back" to refer to his position as a wide receiver that started playing running back midway through the 2021 NFL season. He was ranked 19th by his fellow players on the NFL Top 100 Players of 2022.

==== 2022 season ====
During the 2022 offseason, it was reported that Samuel requested to be traded; however, he reported to training camp and ultimately, on July 31, 2022, signed a three-year, $73.5 million contract extension with $58.1 million guaranteed.

Against the Rams in Week 4, Samuel had six catches for 115 yards and a touchdown on a 57-yard catch-and-run in the 24–9 win. After Week 7 against the Chiefs, Samuel reportedly had a hamstring issue. Head coach Kyle Shanahan called the injury day-to-day. This injury ruled Samuel out for Week 8 against the Rams, but Samuel returned after the team's Week 9 bye. Against the Tampa Bay Buccaneers in Week 14, Samuel had four catches for 43 yards, including 21 rush yards on 4 rush attempts and a rush touchdown on a 17-yard play. However, Samuel injured his ankle and left the game with no return. It was later reported he may have a high ankle sprain. He returned in Week 18. He finished the 2022 season with 56 receptions for 632 receiving yards and two receiving touchdowns to go with 42 rushing attempts for 232 rushing yards and three rushing touchdowns. He played in the 49ers' three postseason games. Samuel recorded six receptions for 133 yards and a receiving touchdown in the Wild Card Round win over the Seahawks. He was ranked 61st by his fellow players on the NFL Top 100 Players of 2023.

==== 2023 season ====
During Week 2 against the Rams. Samuel recorded six receptions for 63 yards, and had five carries on the ground for 38 yards and a touchdown in the 30–23 victory. During Week 3 against the New York Giants, he recorded six receptions for 129 yards and one touchdown, and rushed once for two yards in the 30–12 victory. In Week 13, Samuel had four catches for 116 yards and two touchdowns, along with 22 rushing yards and a touchdown in a 42–19 win over the Philadelphia Eagles, earning NFC Offensive Player of the Week. Prior to the matchup, Samuel was noted for his extensive trash talk to the Philadelphia team on Twitter (most notably calling Eagles' corner James Bradberry “trash”.) This occurred due to the events of the 2023 NFC Championship, where Samuel was held to 3 catches in the 31–7 loss. A month later at the Super Bowl LVIII opening night, when Samuel was asked by reporters if he considers the Eagles and 49ers to be a rivalry, he said “I consider rivalries close games”. In the following game, he had seven receptions for 149 yards to go with a receiving and rushing touchdown in a win over the Seahawks. In the next game, he had two receiving touchdowns in a win over the Cardinals in Week 15. In Week 18, he crossed 1,000 career rushing yards. With this, he became the second player in NFL history to have 4,000 receiving yards and 1,000 rushing yards in their first five seasons (alongside Charley Taylor). He finished the 2023 season with 60 receptions for 892 receiving yards and seven receiving touchdowns to go with 37 rushing attempts for 225 rushing yards and five rushing touchdowns in 15 games. Samuel played in Super Bowl LVIII and caught three passes for 33 yards, but the 49ers lost to the Chiefs 25–22 in overtime. He was ranked 30th by his fellow players on the NFL Top 100 Players of 2024.

==== 2024 season ====
Prior to the 2024 season, Samuel would add multiple changes to his jersey. This included a number change from 19 to 1, and the addition of "Sr." to his last name after his son, Tyshun Samuel Jr., was born. Samuel would score his first touchdown of the season on a 2-yard rush in the Week 1 Monday Night Football victory over the New York Jets. During the Week 5 game against the rival Seattle Seahawks, Samuel scored his first receiving touchdown of the season on a 76-yard pass from quarterback Brock Purdy as part of a 102-yard game. In Week 13 against the Bills, Samuel had six kickoff returns for 208 return yards. He finished the 2024 season with 51 receptions for 670 yards and three receiving touchdowns to go with 42 carries for 136 yards and a rushing touchdown.

=== Washington Commanders ===
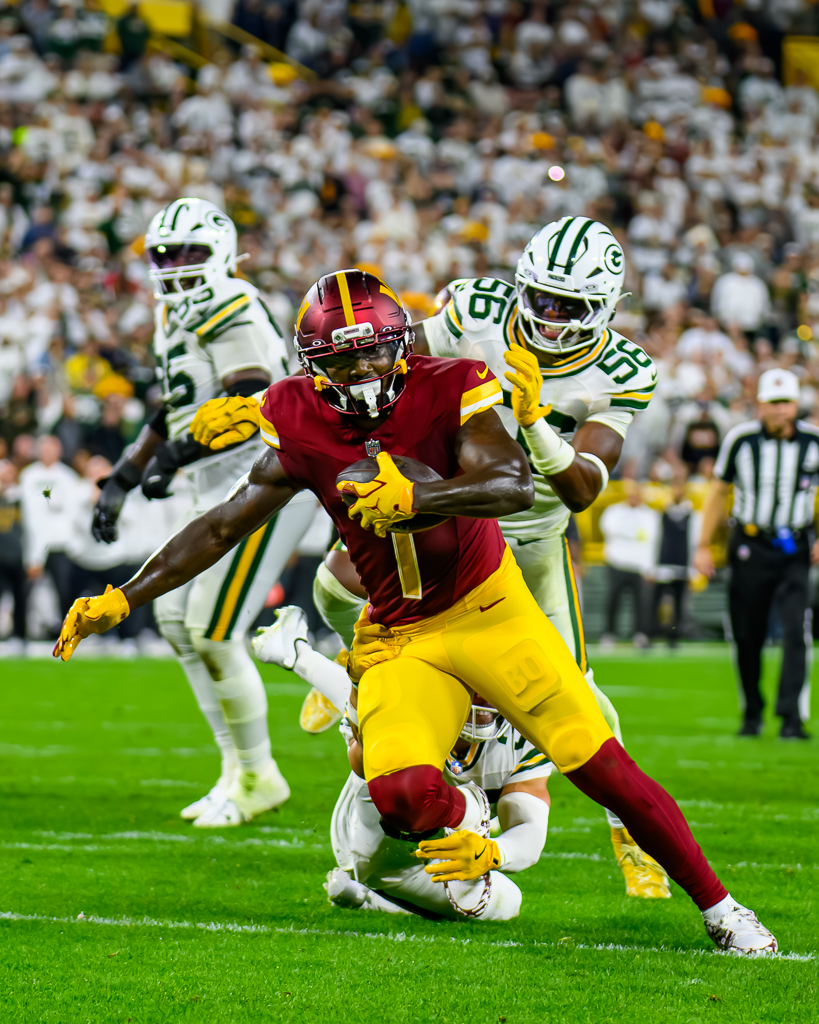
Samuel with the Washington Commanders playing against the Green Bay Packers, 2025

On March 12, 2025, Samuel was traded to the Washington Commanders for a fifth-round selection in the 2025 NFL draft. A week later, the team guaranteed his $17 million base salary for 2024 and included an additional $3 million in incentives. Samuel started his season with a win against the New York Giants in Week 1, a game where his only rushing attempt led to a 19-yard touchdown. He scored another touchdown the following week, though Washington lost 18–27 against the Green Bay Packers. In Week 4, an injury-affected Washington team lost against the Atlanta Falcons, though Samuel was his team's top receiver and scored a touchdown after a pass by backup quarterback Marcus Mariota. Washington beat the Los Angeles Chargers in Week 5 with the returning Jayden Daniels, as Samuel completed the scoring with a late receiving touchdown. Samuel finished the 2025 season with 72 receptions for 727 yards and five receiving touchdowns to go with a rushing touchdown.

=== San Francisco 49ers (second stint) ===
On August 1, 2026, Samuel signed a one-year, $7 million contract with the San Francisco 49ers. He set a NFL record in a Week 3 win over the Arizona Cardinals for most receiving yards on one play without making a reception.

== Career statistics ==
Legend
	Led the league
**Bold**	Career high

=== NFL ===
==== Regular season ====
Year	Team	Games		Receiving					Rushing					Fumbles	
Year	Team	GP	GS	Rec	Yds	Avg	Lng	TD	Att	Yds	Avg	Lng	TD	Fum	Lost
2019	SF	15	11	57	802	14.1	42	3	14	159	**11.4**	31	3	2	1
2020	SF	7	5	33	391	11.8	35	1	8	26	3.3	10	0	0	0
2021	SF	16	15	**77**	**1,405**	**18.2**	**83**	6	**59**	**365**	6.2	49	**8**	**4**	**2**
2022	SF	13	12	56	632	11.3	57	2	42	232	5.5	**51**	3	3	**2**
2023	SF	15	15	60	892	14.9	54	**7**	37	225	6.1	23	5	1	0
2024	SF	15	15	51	670	13.1	76	3	42	136	3.2	13	1	2	1
2025	WAS	16	12	72	727	10.1	41	5	17	75	4.4	29	1	3	0
2026	SF	6	5	19	237	12.5	80	4	12	156	13.0	70	1	2	0
Career		103	90	425	5,756	13.5	83	31	231	1,374	5.9	70	22	17	6

==== Postseason ====
Year	Team	Games		Receiving					Rushing					Fumbles	
Year	Team	GP	GS	Rec	Yds	Avg	Lng	TD	Att	Yds	Avg	Lng	TD	Fum	Lost
2019	SF	3	3	10	127	12.7	30	0	6	102	**17.0**	**32**	0	0	0
2021	SF	3	3	10	154	15.4	44	**1**	**27**	**137**	5.1	26	**1**	0	0
2022	SF	3	3	**13**	**211**	**16.2**	**74**	**1**	13	34	2.6	22	0	**1**	**1**
2023	SF	3	3	**13**	146	11.2	26	0	6	15	2.5	9	0	0	0
Career		12	12	46	638	13.9	74	2	52	288	5.5	32	1	1	1

=== College ===
Season	Team	GP	Receiving				Rushing				Kick returns			
Season	Team	GP	Rec	Yds	Avg	TD	Att	Yds	Avg	TD	Ret	Yds	Avg	TD
2014	South Carolina	0	Redshirt											
2015	South Carolina	5	12	161	13.4	1	0	0	0.0	0	1	24	24.0	0
2016	South Carolina	10	59	783	13.3	1	**15**	**98**	6.5	**6**	16	431	26.9	1
2017	South Carolina	3	15	250	**16.7**	3	2	30	**15.0**	1	2	194	**97.0**	**2**
2018	South Carolina	12	**62**	**882**	14.2	**11**	8	26	3.3	0	**23**	**570**	24.8	1
Career		30	148	2,076	14.0	16	25	154	6.2	7	42	1,219	29.0	4

== Career highlights ==
=== Awards and honors ===
- First-team All-Pro (2021)
- Pro Bowl (2021)
- 3× NFL Top 100 — 19th (2022), 61st (2023), 30th (2024)
- First-team All-American (2018)

=== NFL records ===
- Most rushing touchdowns by a wide receiver all-time: 20
- First wide receiver to record at least 20 rushing touchdowns and 20 receiving touchdowns in a career
- Most rushing touchdowns in a single season by a wide receiver: 8 (2021)

== Personal life ==
Samuel was given the nickname "Deebo" by his father after the character Deebo played by Tiny Lister Jr. from the 1995 film Friday.
