= Cole Blackman =

No. 14 – San Diego Strike Force
- Position: Wide receiver
- Roster status: Active

Personal information
- Born: Glen Allen, Virginia, U.S.
- Listed height: 6 ft 2 in (1.88 m)
- Listed weight: 200 lb (91 kg)

Career information
- High school: Atlee (Mechanicsville, Virginia)
- College: Virginia (2016–2018); Illinois State (2019); William & Mary (2021)

Career history
- BC Lions (2023); Frisco Fighters (2024–2025); Tulsa Oilers (2024–2025); San Diego Strike Force (2025–present)

Cole Blackman is an American football wide receiver for the San Diego Strike Force of the Indoor Football League (IFL). He played college football for the Virginia Cavaliers, the Illinois State Redbirds and the William & Mary Tribe.

== Early life ==
Blackman was born in Glen Allen, Virginia where he played wide receiver with the Raiders football team at Atlee High School. After the 2015 season, Blackman was named a second-team all-state selection at wide receiver for making 25 receptions for 382 yards in seven games. Graduating in 2016, Blackman was rated a three-star recruiting prospect heading into college football.

== College career ==
=== Virginia ===
Blackman enrolled at the University of Virginia where he played wide receiver with the Virginia Cavaliers in 2016. Although he occasionally played on special teams, Blackman only played in four of the 12 games that season. In 2017, Blackman missed the entire season after sustaining an injury. He returned for the 2018 season in which he played in 10 games. While at Virginia, Blackman studied political science.

=== Illinois State ===
Blackman transferred to Illinois State University where he joined the Redbirds as a special teams wide receiver for the 2019 season. During the season, Blackman played in eight games. He finished his only season recording two receptions for 23 yards.

=== William & Mary ===
Following the resumption of public sporting events in 2021, Blackman transferred to the College of William & Mary. In his junior season with the William & Mary Tribe, Blackman started in all three games and led the team in recording 12 pass receptions during the team's spring season. He played his senior season the same year in which he started in 10 of 11 total games and once more led the team in recording 26 receptions. While at William & Mary, Blackman was an honor student during both junior and senior semesters. He received his master's degree in education from William & Mary in 2022.

== Professional career ==
On April 17, 2023, Blackman signed with the BC Lions of the Canadian Football League.

In 2023, Blackman briefly joined the Frisco Fighters of the Indoor Football League (IFL). He was re-signed on October 5, 2023. He played with the Frisco Fighters from March 2024 until August 2025. During the 2024 IFL season, Blackman led the team with 505 receiving yards on 40 receptions with 14 touchdowns.

In August 2024, Blackman was signed to the Tulsa Oilers. While on the team in 2025, Blackman played alongside former Frisco Fighters quarterback and teammate T. J. Edwards.

On December 31, 2025, Blackman signed with the San Diego Strike Force.

== Personal life ==
Outside of his playing career, Blackman also head coached football part-time in the Henrico County, Virginia school system in late 2023. He has also worked for Icon Sports & Entertainment as a seasonal consultant since August 2025.
