= Tim Harris (cornerback) =

American football player (born 1995)

Profile
- Position: Cornerback

Personal information
- Born: July 31, 1995 (age 31); Richmond, Virginia, U.S.
- Listed height: 6 ft 1 in (1.85 m)
- Listed weight: 205 lb (93 kg)

Career information
- High school: Varina (Henrico, Virginia)
- College: Virginia (2013–2018)
- NFL draft: 2019: 6th round, 198th overall pick

Career history
- San Francisco 49ers (2019–2020); Buffalo Bills (2021)*; Cleveland Browns (2021); Buffalo Bills (2021–2022)*; St. Louis BattleHawks (2023–2024)
- * Offseason or practice squad member only

Career NFL statistics
- Total tackles: 2
- Stats at Pro Football Reference

Timothy Harris Jr. (born July 31, 1995) is an American professional football cornerback. He played college football at Virginia.

== Professional career ==
=== San Francisco 49ers ===
Harris was selected by the San Francisco 49ers in the sixth round (198th overall) of the 2019 NFL draft. He was placed on injured reserve on August 26, 2019, with a groin injury.

On September 5, 2020, Harris was waived by the 49ers and signed to the practice squad the next day. He was placed on the practice squad/injured list on September 16, and restored to the practice squad on October 7. He was elevated to the active roster on December 7 and December 25 for the team's weeks 13 and 16 games against the Buffalo Bills and Arizona Cardinals, and reverted to the practice squad after each game. He signed a reserve/future contract on January 4, 2021. On August 4, 2021, Harris was waived/injured by the 49ers and placed on injured reserve. He was released on August 11.

=== Buffalo Bills (first stint) ===
On August 24, 2021, Harris signed a one-year deal with the Bills. He was waived on August 30, 2021.

=== Cleveland Browns ===
Harris was signed to the Cleveland Browns' practice squad on September 2, 2021. The Browns elevated Harris to their active roster on October 30, 2021; he reverted to the practice squad on November 1, 2021. Harris was released from the Browns' practice squad on November 10, 2021.

=== Buffalo Bills (second stint) ===
On November 29, 2021, Harris was signed to the Bills practice squad. After the Bills were eliminated in the Divisional Round of the 2021 playoffs, he signed a reserve/future contract on January 24, 2022. He was released on August 16, 2022.

=== St. Louis BattleHawks ===
Harris was placed on the reserve list by the St. Louis BattleHawks of the XFL on February 20, 2023. He was activated on March 13. He re-signed with the team on January 23, 2024.
