= List of South Carolina Gamecocks in the NFL draft =

This is a list of South Carolina Gamecocks football players in the NFL draft.

== Key ==
B	Back	K	Kicker	NT	Nose tackle
C	Center	LB	Linebacker	FB	Fullback
DB	Defensive back	P	Punter	HB	Halfback
DE	Defensive end	QB	Quarterback	WR	Wide receiver
DT	Defensive tackle	RB	Running back	G	Guard
E	End	T	Offensive tackle	TE	Tight end

== Selections ==
Year	Round	Pick	Player	Team	Position
1939	6	49	Larry Craig	Green Bay Packers	E
1939	14	121	Ed Clary	Pittsburgh Steelers	B
1942	6	49	Joe Krivonak	Green Bay Packers	G
1942	14	129	Bill Applegate	Green Bay Packers	G
1943	6	47	Lou Sossamon	Pittsburgh Steelers	C
1944	8	75	Stan Stasica	Cleveland Rams	B
1944	15	146	Dom Fusci	Philadelphia Eagles	T
1944	24	248	Ed Bauer	Washington Redskins	G
1945	13	123	George McDonald	Brooklyn Dodgers	T
1945	16	156	Skimp Harrison	Brooklyn Dodgers	E
1945	16	160	Dom Fusci	Washington Redskins	T
1945	24	246	Stan Nowak	Cleveland Rams	E
1946	15	138	Pat Thrash	Detroit Lions	E
1947	7	49	Bryant Meeks	Pittsburgh Steelers	C
1947	9	66	Kale Alexander	Detroit Lions	T
1947	28	263	Jim Hunnicutt	Los Angeles Rams	B
1947	29	274	Claude Harrison	New York Giants	B
1947	31	291	James Atwell	Los Angeles Rams	B
1948	26	237	Phil Alexander	Detroit Lions	T
1950	9	108	Roger Wilson	Green Bay Packers	E
1951	6	64	Bishop Strickland	San Francisco 49ers	B
1951	15	173	Dave Sparks	San Francisco 49ers	G
1951	16	195	Ed Pasky	Cleveland Browns	B
1951	20	240	Larry Smith	Chicago Bears	C
1952	3	30	Steve Wadiak	Pittsburgh Steelers	B
1952	7	75	Harry Jabbusch	Chicago Cardinals	C
1952	24	279	John Schuetzner	Green Bay Packers	E
1953	21	245	Don Earley	Pittsburgh Steelers	G
1954	3	28	Clyde Bennett	New York Giants	E
1954	3	29	Jim Kincaid	Los Angeles Rams	B
1954	5	59	Frank Mincevich	San Francisco 49ers	G
1954	11	128	Gene Wilson	Washington Redskins	B
1954	15	176	Hugh Merck	Washington Redskins	T
1954	18	216	Bill Wohrman	Cleveland Browns	B
1954	19	220	Bob King	New York Giants	G
1954	24	288	Johnny Gramling	Cleveland Browns	B
1954	30	357	Tommy Woodlee	Philadelphia Eagles	B
1955	8	90	Leon Cunningham	Detroit Lions	G
1955	13	149	Ed Adams	Green Bay Packers	B
1955	28	336	Harry Lovell	Detroit Lions	G
1956	10	110	Joe Silas	Detroit Lions	DE
1957	2	23	Sam DeLuca	New York Giants	T
1957	15	181	Julius Derrick	New York Giants	E
1957	20	237	Buddy Frick	Washington Redskins	E
1957	20	239	Alex Lazzarino	Detroit Lions	T
1957	28	337	Corky Gaines	New York Giants	G
1958	12	141	Tom Addison	Baltimore Colts	G
1958	22	265	Buddy Nidiffer	Detroit Lions	E
1958	23	267	Jack Ashton	Green Bay Packers	G
1958	23	277	Frank Destino	Detroit Lions	B
1958	28	337	Jack Pitt	Detroit Lions	E
1959	2	13	Alex Hawkins	Green Bay Packers	B
1959	7	74	Don Rogers	San Francisco 49ers	T
1959	8	85	Buddy Mayfield	Green Bay Packers	E
1959	13	155	John Kompara	New York Giants	T
1959	27	317	Bill Jerry	Detroit Lions	T
1960	7	77	Kirk Phares	Green Bay Packers	G
1960	11	126	Ed Pitts	San Francisco 49ers	T
1960	13	154	Jim Nemeth	Baltimore Colts	C
1960	17	197	Joe Gomes	Green Bay Packers	B
1961	11	145	Sam Fewell	Chicago Bears	T
1962	14	183	Jim Costen	Washington Redskins	RB
1962	20	278	Jim Moss	New York Giants	T
1963	7	86	Jim Moss	St. Louis Cardinals	T
1963	14	196	James Holler	Green Bay Packers	LB
1964	6	79	Tom Gibson	Pittsburgh Steelers	G
1965	12	157	Steve Cox	Chicago Bears	T
1965	13	171	J. R. Wilburn	Pittsburgh Steelers	WR
1965	19	262	Len Sears	Green Bay Packers	T
1966	13	186	Bob Collins	Atlanta Falcons	T
1966	13	190	Ron Lamb	Dallas Cowboys	RB
1967	7	167	Bobby Bryant	Minnesota Vikings	DB
1967	12	294	Stan Juk	Miami Dolphins	LB
1967	16	407	Paul Phillips	San Diego Chargers	T
1968	17	444	Bob Cole	Pittsburgh Steelers	LB
1969	14	352	Roy Reeves	Houston Oilers	DB
1970	15	377	Warren Muir	New York Giants	RB
1971	11	279	Jim Poston	Oakland Raiders	DT
1971	15	370	Dan Dyches	New York Jets	C
1972	5	114	Dickie Harris	New York Jets	DB
1972	5	126	Bob Davies	New Orleans Saints	DB
1972	13	335	Tyler Hellams	Kansas City Chiefs	DB
1973	7	169	Mike Haggard	New York Jets	WR
1973	9	230	Rick Brown	Green Bay Packers	LB
1973	10	259	John LeHeup	Buffalo Bills	LB
1973	15	374	Jackie Brown	Baltimore Colts	DB
1974	7	159	Marty Woolbright	New York Giants	TE
1974	16	404	Darrell Austin	Denver Broncos	T
1975	9	217	Jay Hodgin	Green Bay Packers	RB
1976	8	236	Henry Laws	Dallas Cowboys	DB
1976	11	317	Brian Nemeth	Los Angeles Rams	TE
1976	12	335	Mike McCabe	Detroit Lions	C
1976	17	480	Jeff Grantz	Miami Dolphins	QB
1977	5	124	Clarence Williams	San Diego Chargers	RB
1977	5	125	Steve Courson	Pittsburgh Steelers	G
1977	7	195	Kevin Long	New York Jets	RB
1977	9	232	Bill Currier	Houston Oilers	DB
1979	1	25	Rick Sanford	New England Patriots	DB
1979	8	211	Max Runager	Philadelphia Eagles	P
1980	11	285	Steve Bernish	New York Giants	DE
1981	1	1	George Rogers	New Orleans Saints	RB
1981	1	14	Willie Scott	Kansas City Chiefs	TE
1982	2	54	Emanuel Weaver	Cincinnati Bengals	DT
1982	6	160	DeWayne Chivers	Buffalo Bills	TE
1982	8	198	Chuck Slaughter	New Orleans Saints	T
1982	12	307	Johnnie Wright	Baltimore Colts	RB
1983	3	75	Andrew Provence	Atlanta Falcons	DT
1984	3	60	Rusty Russell	Philadelphia Eagles	T
1984	4	86	Rickey Hagood	Seattle Seahawks	DT
1985	8	210	Ira Hillary	Kansas City Chiefs	WR
1985	9	236	Earl Johnson	New Orleans Saints	DB
1985	9	240	Frank Wright	New York Giants	DT
1985	11	282	James Seawright	Buffalo Bills	LB
1986	3	77	Leonard Burton	Buffalo Bills	C
1986	6	141	Kent Hagood	Kansas City Chiefs	RB
1986	11	301	Thomas Dendy	Denver Broncos	RB
1987	10	259	Raynard Brown	Detroit Lions	WR
1988	1	7	Sterling Sharpe	Green Bay Packers	WR
1988	2	54	Brad Edwards	Minnesota Vikings	DB
1988	6	158	Roy Hart	Seattle Seahawks	DT
1988	11	296	Norman Floyd	Minnesota Vikings	DB
1988	12	323	Brendan McCormack	New York Giants	DT
1988s	5	0	Ryan Bethea	Minnesota Vikings	WR
1989	6	154	Derrick Little	Tampa Bay Buccaneers	LB
1989	7	179	Kevin Hendrix	Washington Redskins	LB
1990	2	38	Harold Green	Cincinnati Bengals	RB
1990	9	247	Todd Ellis	Denver Broncos	QB
1991	3	56	Calvin Stephens	New England Patriots	G
1991	6	167	Corey Miller	New York Giants	LB
1991	8	211	Mike Dingle	Cincinnati Bengals	RB
1991	12	324	Ike Harris	Seattle Seahawks	G
1992	3	62	Robert Brooks	Green Bay Packers	WR
1992	3	78	Gerald Dixon	Cleveland Browns	LB
1992	9	225	Eddie Miller	Indianapolis Colts	WR
1993	1	18	Ernest Dye	Phoenix Cardinals	T
1994	3	98	Corey Louchiey	Buffalo Bills	T
1996	4	118	Stanley Pritchett	Miami Dolphins	RB
1996	5	137	James Dexter	Arizona Cardinals	T
1997	3	71	Duce Staley	Philadelphia Eagles	RB
1997	4	108	Marcus Robinson	Chicago Bears	WR
1998	5	130	Darren Hambrick	Dallas Cowboys	LB
1998	6	168	Lee Wiggins	Tennessee Oilers	DB
2000	1	13	John Abraham	New York Jets	LB
2000	5	152	Arturo Freeman	Miami Dolphins	DB
2002	2	35	Kalimba Edwards	Detroit Lions	DE
2002	2	59	Sheldon Brown	Philadelphia Eagles	DB
2002	3	68	André Goodman	Detroit Lions	DB
2002	3	70	Matt Padgett	New Orleans Saints	K
2002	6	193	John Stamper	Tampa Bay Buccaneers	DE
2003	6	174	Langston Moore	Cincinnati Bengals	DT
2003	6	181	Corey Jenkins	Miami Dolphins	DB
2003	7	229	Andrew Pinnock	San Diego Chargers	RB
2004	1	10	Dunta Robinson	Houston Texans	DB
2004	3	94	Travelle Wharton	Carolina Panthers	T
2004	6	184	Deandre' Eiland	Minnesota Vikings	DB
2005	1	7	Troy Williamson	Minnesota Vikings	WR
2005	7	220	Rod Wilson	Chicago Bears	DB
2005	7	241	Darrell Shropshire	Atlanta Falcons	DT
2006	1	24	Johnathan Joseph	Cincinnati Bengals	DB
2006	4	105	Ko Simpson	Buffalo Bills	DB
2007	2	44	Sidney Rice	Minnesota Vikings	WR
2007	4	123	Fred Bennett	Houston Texans	DB
2008	7	238	Cory Boyd	Tampa Bay Buccaneers	RB
2009	3	89	Jared Cook	Tennessee Titans	TE
2009	5	141	Kenny McKinley	Denver Broncos	WR
2009	5	150	Jasper Brinkley	Minnesota Vikings	LB
2009	5	162	Jamon Meredith	Green Bay Packers	T
2009	7	216	Captain Munnerlyn	Carolina Panthers	DB
2009	7	238	Stoney Woodson	New York Giants	DB
2009	7	256	Ryan Succop	Kansas City Chiefs	K
2010	4	124	Eric Norwood	Carolina Panthers	LB
2010	6	186	Clifton Geathers	Cleveland Browns	TE
2011	3	80	Chris Culliver	San Francisco 49ers	DB
2011	7	230	Cliff Matthews	Atlanta Falcons	DE
2012	1	10	Stephon Gilmore	Buffalo Bills	DB
2012	1	18	Melvin Ingram	San Diego Chargers	DE
2012	2	45	Alshon Jeffery	Chicago Bears	WR
2012	5	150	Rokevious Watkins	St. Louis Rams	T
2012	7	242	Antonio Allen	New York Jets	DB
2012	7	249	Travian Robertson	Atlanta Falcons	DT
2013	2	57	D. J. Swearinger	Houston Texans	DB
2013	4	101	Ace Sanders	Jacksonville Jaguars	WR
2013	4	131	Marcus Lattimore	San Francisco 49ers	RB
2013	4	132	Devin Taylor	Detroit Lions	DE
2013	6	185	DeVonte Holloman	Dallas Cowboys	LB
2013	7	251	T. J. Johnson	Cincinnati Bengals	C
2013	7	254	Justice Cunningham	Indianapolis Colts	TE
2014	1	1	Jadeveon Clowney	Houston Texans	DE
2014	4	106	Bruce Ellington	San Francisco 49ers	WR
2015	3	67	A. J. Cann	Jacksonville Jaguars	G
2015	4	126	Mike Davis	San Francisco 49ers	RB
2015	7	240	Corey Robinson	Detroit Lions	T
2015	7	254	Busta Anderson	San Francisco 49ers	TE
2016	4	117	Pharoh Cooper	Los Angeles Rams	WR
2016	5	158	Brandon Shell	New York Jets	T
2016	6	184	Jerell Adams	New York Giants	TE
2018	1	25	Hayden Hurst	Baltimore Ravens	TE
2019	2	36	Deebo Samuel	San Francisco 49ers	WR
2019	6	201	Rashad Fenton	Kansas City Chiefs	DB
2019	6	212	Dennis Daley	Carolina Panthers	T
2020	1	14	Javon Kinlaw	San Francisco 49ers	DT
2020	3	81	Bryan Edwards	Las Vegas Raiders	WR
2020	4	117	D. J. Wonnum	Minnesota Vikings	DE
2020	7	238	T. J. Brunson	New York Giants	LB
2021	1	8	Jaycee Horn	Carolina Panthers	DB
2021	3	103	Ernest Jones	Los Angeles Rams	LB
2021	6	204	Shi Smith	Carolina Panthers	WR
2021	6	227	Israel Mukuamu	Dallas Cowboys	DB
2022	5	179	Kingsley Enagbare	Green Bay Packers	DE
2022	6	183	Kevin Harris	New England Patriots	RB
2022	7	227	Nick Muse	Minnesota Vikings	TE
2023	2	51	Cam Smith	Miami Dolphins	DB
2023	3	64	Zacch Pickens	Chicago Bears	DT
2023	5	138	Darius Rush	Indianapolis Colts	DB
2023	7	225	Jovaughn Gwyn	Atlanta Falcons	G
2023	7	244	Jalen Brooks	Dallas Cowboys	WR
2024	1	32	Xavier Legette	Carolina Panthers	WR
2024	5	150	Spencer Rattler	New Orleans Saints	QB
2024	6	180	Marcellas Dial	New England Patriots	DB
2024	7	256	Nick Gargiulo	Denver Broncos	C
2025	2	35	Nick Emmanwori	Seattle Seahawks	DB
2025	2	41	T. J. Sanders	Buffalo Bills	DT
2025	2	49	Demetrius Knight	Cincinnati Bengals	LB
2025	4	125	Kyle Kennard	Los Angeles Chargers	DE
2025	4	135	Tonka Hemingway	Las Vegas Raiders	DT
2026	2	35	Brandon Cisse	Green Bay Packers	DB
2026	5	145	Nick Barrett	Los Angeles Chargers	DT
2026	5	167	Jalon Kilgore	Buffalo Bills	DB

== Notable undrafted players ==
Note: No drafts held before 1936

Debut Year	Player	Debut Team	Position	Notes
1971	Rusty Ganas	Baltimore Colts	DT	—
1995	Brandon Bennett	Cleveland Browns	RB	—
1999	Zola Davis	Green Bay Packers	WR	—
1999	Anthony Wright	Pittsburgh Steelers	QB	—
2008	Cory Boyd	Tampa Bay Buccaneers	RB	—
2011	Tori Gurley	Green Bay Packers	WR	—
2014	Connor Shaw	Cleveland Browns	QB	—
2015	Dylan Thompson	San Francisco 49ers	QB	—
2019	Keisean Nixon	Oakland Raiders	CB	—
2023	Nate Adkins	Denver Broncos	TE	—
2023	Dante Miller	New York Giants	RB	—
2024	Ahmarean Brown	Cleveland Browns	WR	—
2024	Tyreek Johnson	New York Jets	DL	—
2024	Trey Knox	Minnesota Vikings	TE	—
2025	Dalevon Campbell	Los Angeles Chargers	WR	–
2025	O'Donnell Fortune	New York Giants	CB	–
2025	Alex Huntley	Miami Dolphins	DT	–
2025	Kai Kroeger	New York Jets	P	–
2025	Gage Larvadain	Cleveland Browns	WR	–
2025	Vershon Lee	Minnesota Vikings	OG	–
2025	Bam Martin-Scott	Carolina Panthers	LB	–
2025	Raheim Sanders	Los Angeles Chargers	RB	–
2026	Bryan Thomas Jr.	Jacksonville Jaguars	DE	—
