= Riverwood International Charter School =

Public high school in Sandy Springs, Georgia, United States

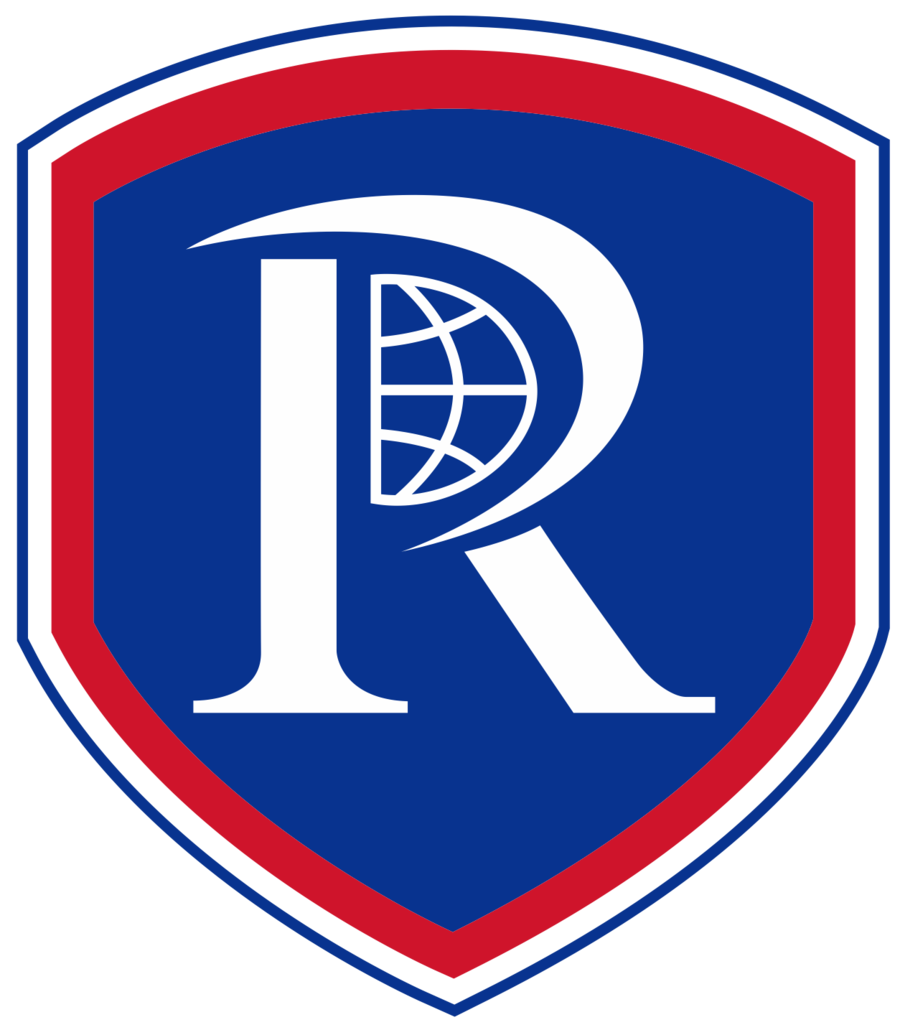

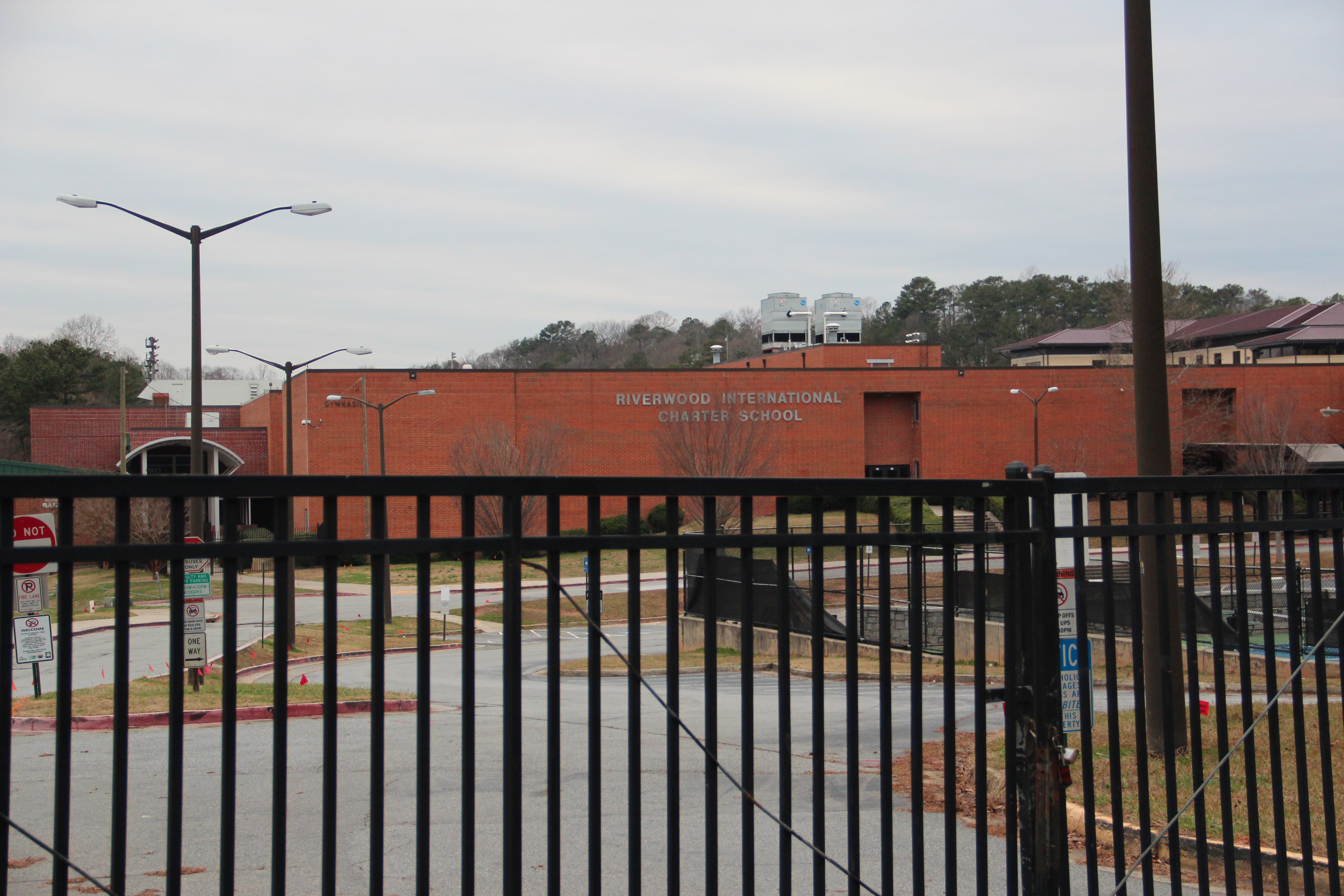
- Riverwood in 2017

Location
- 5900 Raider Drive NW; Sandy Springs, Georgia 30328; United States; 33°55′03″N 84°25′02″W

Information
- Type: Charter school
- Established: 1971
- School district: Fulton County School System
- CEEB code: 110216
- NCES School ID: 130228000987
- Principal: Kindra Smith
- Staff: 106.30 (on an FTE basis)
- Enrollment: 1,716 (2023–2024)
- Student to teacher ratio: 16.14
- Colors: Blue, white and red
- Mascot: Ricky the Raider
- Nickname: Raiders
- Rival: North Springs High School
- Website: riverwood.fultonschools.org

Riverwood International Charter School is a charter school located in Sandy Springs, Georgia, United States. It is one of Fulton County's four magnet sites, offering International Studies and International Baccalaureate programs.

== Notable alumni ==
- Becky Albertalli - novelist known for the YA novel Simon vs. the Homo Sapiens Agenda
- Kate Bedingfield - White House Communications Director
- Jay Busbee - journalist, novelist, sportswriter
- Kyle Kennard - professional football player
- Amaechi Morton - collegiate runner (Stanford University), participated in the 2012 Summer Olympics (Nigeria)
- Deborah Silcox - politician
- Gabriel Sterling - Chief Operating Officer of the Georgia Secretary of State's office
- Tyler Thornburg - professional baseball player
- Daniela Avanzini - member of Katseye
- Erika Mitchell - Politician (Atlanta Board of Education, Board Member and former Board President)
