= South Carolina Gamecocks football =

Football team of the University of South Carolina

2026 South Carolina Gamecocks football team
- First season: 1892; 134 years ago
- Athletic director: Jeremiah Donati
- Head coach: Shane Beamer; 6th season, 39–35 (.527)
- Location: Columbia, South Carolina
- Stadium: Williams–Brice Stadium (capacity: 77,559)
- NCAA division: Division I FBS
- Conference: SEC
- Colors: Garnet and black
- All-time record: 654–630–44 (.509)
- Bowl record: 10–16 (.385)

Conference championships
- SoCon: 1933, 1941 ACC: 1969

Division championships
- SEC East: 2010
- Heisman winners: George Rogers – 1980
- Consensus All-Americans: 5
- Rivalries: Clemson (rivalry); Georgia (rivalry); Missouri (rivalry); Texas A&M (rivalry); North Carolina (rivalry)

Uniforms
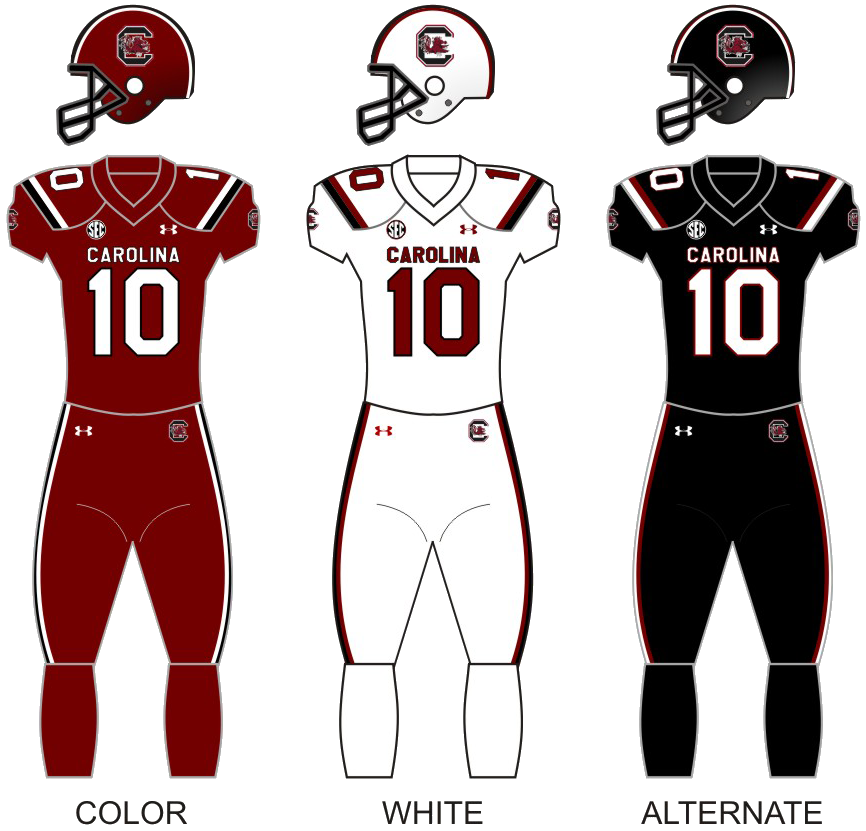
- Fight song: "The Fighting Gamecocks Lead the Way"
- Mascot: Cocky, Sir Big Spur
- Marching band: Mighty Sound of the Southeast
- Website: Gamecocksonline.com

The South Carolina Gamecocks football team represents the University of South Carolina in American football. The Gamecocks compete in the Football Bowl Subdivision of the NCAA and are members of the Southeastern Conference. Shane Beamer is the head coach, and they play home games at Williams-Brice Stadium in Columbia.

From 1953 through 1970, the Gamecocks played in the Atlantic Coast Conference, finishing No. 14 in the 1958 final AP poll and winning the 1969 ACC Championship. From 1971 through 1991, they competed as a major independent, producing 1980 Heisman Trophy winner George Rogers, six bowl appearances, and final AP top-25 rankings in 1984 and 1987 (No. 11 and No. 15). Since 1992, they have competed in the Southeastern Conference, winning the SEC East Division in 2010 and posting eight final top-25 rankings, including three top-10 finishes and one top-5 finish.

South Carolina has produced a National Coach of the Year in Joe Morrison (1984), four SEC coaches of the year in Lou Holtz (2000), Steve Spurrier (2005, 2010), and Shane Beamer (2024), one ACC coach of the year in Paul Dietzel (1969), and two overall #1 NFL Draft picks in George Rogers (1981) and Jadeveon Clowney (2014). They also have five members of the College Football Hall of Fame in former players George Rogers and Sterling Sharpe, and former coaches Holtz and Spurrier as well as former Athletic Director Mike McGee.

== History ==
=== Early history (1892–1965) ===
Carolina fielded its first football team on Christmas Eve, in Charleston, South Carolina, in 1892 versus Furman. At that time the football team was not sanctioned by the university. They provided their own uniforms and paid their own train fare in order to participate in the game. They were nicknamed the "College Boys" by The News and Courier and their supporters wore garnet and black.

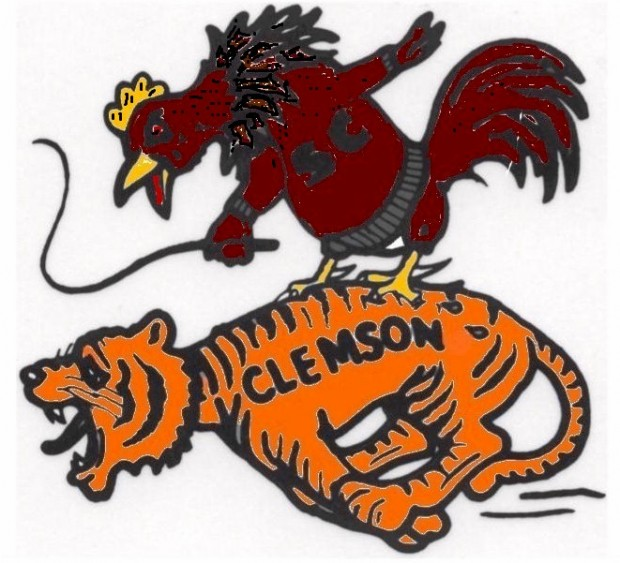
Cartoon about a South Carolina v Clemson game of 1902: the cock subdues the tiger

USC won its first game in its third season, on November 2, 1895, against Columbia AA. The squad designated their first head coach, W. H. "Dixie" Whaley, the following year. The 1896 season also saw the inaugural game against arch-rival Clemson on November 12, which Carolina won 12–6. From 1902 to 1903, coach Bob Williams led the Gamecocks to a 14–3 record. In 1902, South Carolina beat Clemson, coached by John Heisman, for the first time since 1896, the first year of the rivalry. "The Carolina fans that week were carrying around a poster with the image of a tiger with a gamecock standing on top of it, holding the tiger's tail as if he was steering the tiger by the tail", Jay McCormick said. "Naturally, the Clemson guys didn't take too kindly to that, and on Wednesday and again on Thursday, there were sporadic fistfights involving brass knuckles and other objects and so forth, some of which resulted, according to the newspapers, in blood being spilled and persons having to seek medical assistance. After the game on Thursday, the Clemson guys frankly told the Carolina students that if you bring this poster, which is insulting to us, to the big parade on Friday, you're going to be in trouble. And naturally, of course, the Carolina students brought the poster to the parade. If you give someone an ultimatum and they're your rival, they're going to do exactly what you told them not to do."

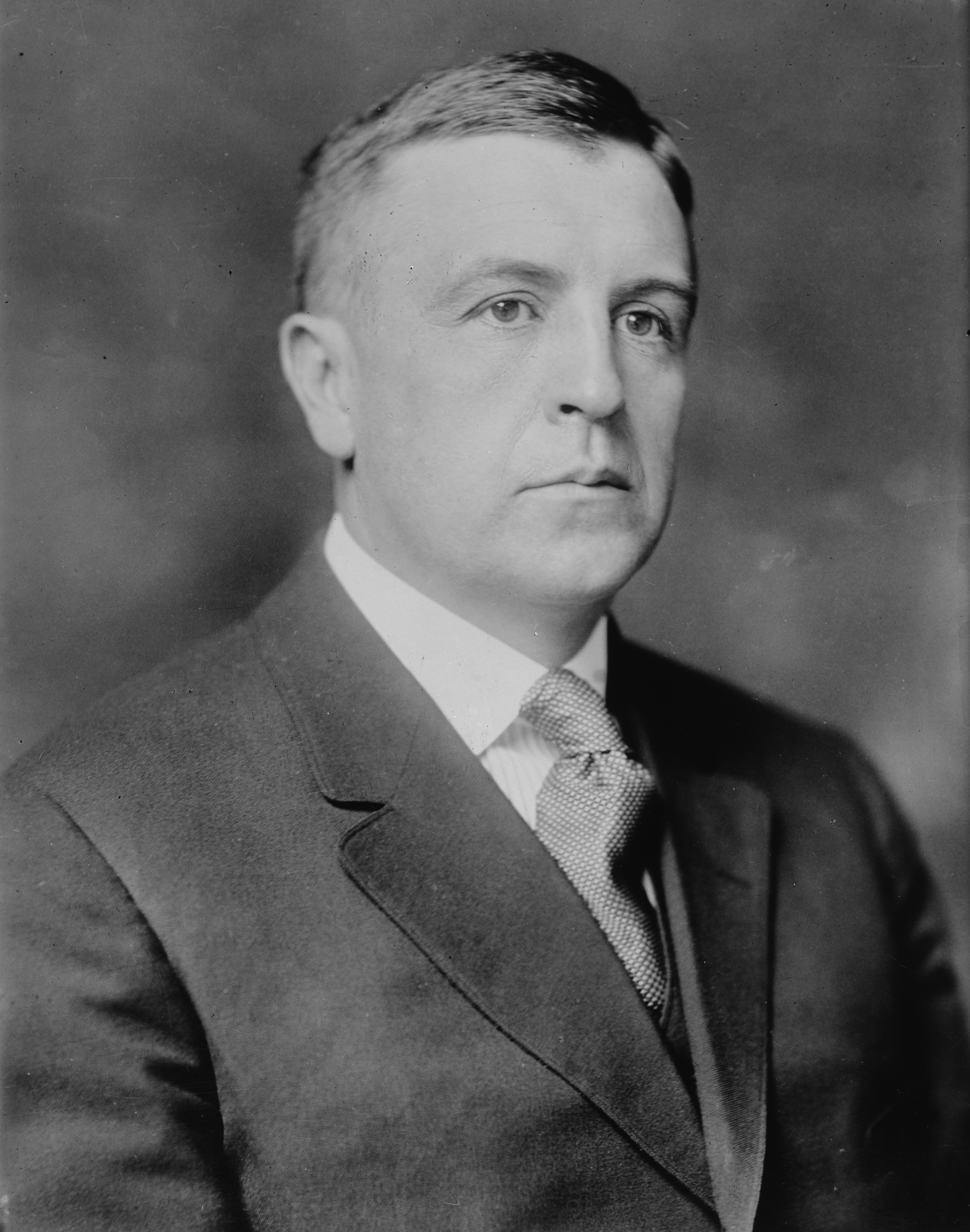
Senator Christie Benet played football at South Carolina

As expected, another brawl broke out before both sides agreed to mutually burn the poster in an effort to defuse tensions. The immediate aftermath resulted in the stoppage of the rivalry until 1909. 1903 also heralded the program's first 8-win season with an overall record of 8–2. Future senator and former star player for South Carolina and UVA, Christie Benet led the Gamecocks from 1904 to 1905 and 1908 to 1909. 1904's captain Gene Oliver played against Georgia with a broken jaw.

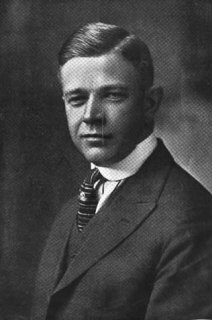
Sol Metzger served as coach during 1920–24

The Board of Trustees banned participation in football for the 1906 season after the faculty complained that the coarseness of chants and cheers, yelled by the students at football games, were not gentlemanly in nature. Within months The Board of Trustees reversed their decision after hearing pleas, and receiving petitions, from students and alumni alike. Play was allowed to resume in 1907. A hastily assembled football team, coached by Board of Trustees member Douglas McKay, competed in an abbreviated season that same year, and the squad won all three games. In 1910, South Carolina hired John Neff from UVA. Norman B. Edgerton coached the team from 1912 to 1915. A. B. Stoney played on the team. Yet another UVA grad, W. Rice Warren coached the 1916 team. Frank Dobson led the war-torn 1918 team to a 2–1–1 record. Coach Sol Metzger led the 1921 team to a 5–1–2 record, losing only to Billy Laval's Furman. Branch Bocock coached the 1925 and 1926 teams.

Billy Laval, a Columbia native, came to USC from Furman. Laval accepted a three-year contract worth $8,000 per year to coach the Gamecocks, which made him the highest-paid coach in the state. From 1928 to 1934, he led the Gamecocks to seven consecutive winning seasons and a 39–26–6 overall record, which included a perfect 3–0 Southern Conference campaign in 1933. Laval is one of only two South Carolina football coaches to have produced seven consecutive winning seasons (Steve Spurrier is the other, from 2008 to 2014). In 2009, The State called him "the greatest collegiate coach" in the history of South Carolina. Laval left USC after six seasons to coach multiple sports at Emory and Henry College, partly due to differences over his contract with the USC athletics department. 1934 was the first season that Williams–Brice Stadium was used. Prior to this, South Carolina played its home games on the school's campus. Don McCallister led the Gamecocks for three seasons before being replaced. His final record is 13–20–1.

Under coach Rex Enright, who came to USC from his post as an assistant coach at Georgia, the Gamecocks produced another undefeated Southern Conference season, (4–0–1), in 1941. After the 1942 season, Enright joined the United States Navy serving as a lieutenant and working mostly in their athletic program in the United States. After three head coaches (James P. Moran, Williams Newton, John D. McMillan) who had gone 10–10–5 combined in four years with one bowl appearance, Enright returned to the Gamecocks in 1946 as head football coach, and remained until 1955 when he resigned for health reasons. He hired Warren Giese as his successor, and continued as athletic director until 1960. The Rex Enright Athletic Center on the South Carolina campus was named for him and the Rex Enright Award (also known as the Captain's Cup) given to the football captains of the previous season. Enright gave-up his coaching duties in 1955 due to reasons related to poor health. Enright retired with the distinction of being the head coach with the most wins and losses in school history (64–69–7), and he still retains the record for most school losses and is 2nd in wins. Warren Giese, who was previously an assistant coach at Maryland, was hired as head coach in 1956, and he led the Gamecocks to a 28–21–1 overall record in his 5-year tenure. Giese employed a conservative, run-first game strategy, but he enthusiastically adopted the two-point conversion when it was made legal in 1958. That year, he also correctly predicted the rise of special teams after the NCAA relaxed its player substitution rules. The Giese era included two 7–3 campaigns (1956 and 1958), an 18–15–1 ACC record, and a 27–21 victory over Darrell Royal's 1957 Texas squad in Austin. Griese was replaced after a 3–6 season in 1960. Marvin Bass was hired away from Georgia Tech, where he served as defensive coordinator, as the Gamecocks head football coach. He posted a 17–29–4 record in his four-year tenure and was replaced after five seasons due to the team's struggles and low fan support.

=== Paul Dietzel era (1966–1974) ===
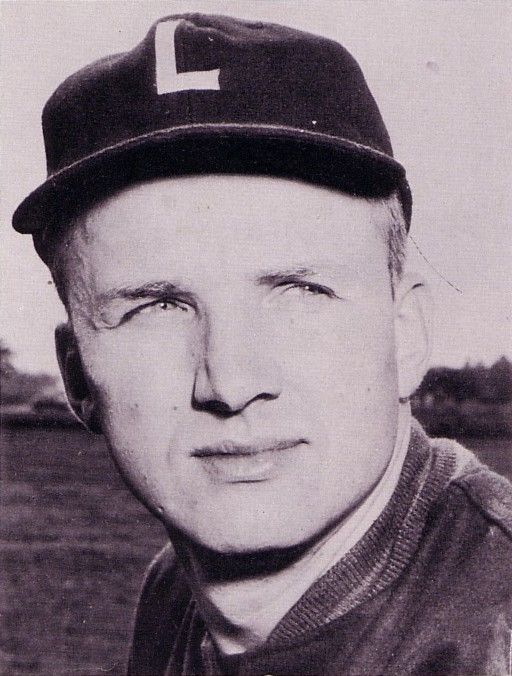
Coach Dietzel

Paul Dietzel arrived in Columbia prior to the 1966 season, having previously coached at LSU, where he won a national championship, and Army.

In 1969, he led the Gamecocks to an ACC championship and an appearance in the Peach Bowl. As a result, Dietzel was named ACC Coach of the Year that season. Soon after, South Carolina left the ACC and became an Independent program prior to the 1971 season. Dietzel finished his USC tenure with a 42–53–1 overall record (18–10–1 ACC). In addition to the 1969 ACC title, Dietzel's legacies at Carolina include his improvement of athletic facilities and his penning of a new fight song, which is still used to this day ("The Fighting Gamecocks Lead the Way"). Amid growing fan unrest after an upset loss to Duke, Dietzel announced that he would resign at the end of the season, which ended in a 4–7 record.

=== Jim Carlen era (1975–1981) ===
Jim Carlen, previously head football coach at Texas Tech and West Virginia, took over as coach in 1975. Under his leadership the program achieved a measure of national prominence. Carlen led the Gamecocks to three bowl games, coached 1980 Heisman Trophy winner George Rogers, and produced a 45–36–1 record during his tenure. The Carlen Era included consecutive 8–4 finishes (1979–1980) and only one losing season in seven years. The 1980 season was headlined by senior running back George Rogers, who led the nation in rushing with 1,894 yards. For his efforts, the Downtown Athletic Club named Rogers the winner of the 1980 Heisman Trophy award. Rogers beat out a strong group of players, including Georgia running back Herschel Walker. Behind the Rogers-led rushing attack, the Gamecocks went 8–4 overall and earned an appearance in the Gator Bowl. In addition, the 1980 Gamecocks defeated a heavily favored Michigan squad coached by the legendary Bo Schembechler. The 17–14 victory in Ann Arbor, which made Rogers a household name, was one of the biggest wins in both the Carlen Era and the program's history. Carlen retired from coaching after seven seasons at USC.

=== Joe Morrison era (1983–1988) ===
Del Wilkes

Joe Morrison was hired in 1983 following a one-year stint by Richard Bell. After a 5–6 mark in his first year, the "Man in Black" led South Carolina to a 10–2 record, No. 11 final AP Poll ranking, and a Gator Bowl appearance in 1984. It was also before the 1984 season began that the team removed the Astroturf that had been in place at Williams–Brice Stadium since the early 1970s and reinstalled the natural grass that remains today. The 1984 season included victories over Georgia, Pittsburgh, Notre Dame, Florida State, and Clemson. The 1984 defense was called the "Fire Ant" defense. In 1987, the Gamecocks posted an 8–4 record, No. 15 Final AP Poll ranking, and another Gator Bowl trip. The 1987 Gamecocks were led by the "Black Death" defense, which held seven opponents to 10 or fewer points and yielded just 141 points in 12 games played. Morrison coached his last game in the 1988 Liberty Bowl, as he died of a heart attack on February 5, 1989, at the age of 51. He finished his USC tenure with a 39–28–2 overall record, three bowl appearances, and three seasons with 8 or more wins. Due to his on-field success and "Black Magic" image (he traditionally wore all black on the sideline and introduced black uniforms into the team's rotation), Morrison remains a popular figure in Gamecock lore. Morrison also began the tradition at Carolina, with his first game in 1983, of the pre-game entrance of the football team being the beginning of Also sprach Zarathustra, the theme from the film 2001: A Space Odyssey. This is still part of the Carolina football game day experience over 40 years later.

=== Sparky Woods era (1989–1993) ===
Following Morrison's death, Sparky Woods was hired away from Appalachian State as head coach in 1989 and coached the Gamecocks until the end of the 1993 season. He posted winning seasons in 1989 and 1990, but could not produce another winning campaign during his tenure. Woods led the USC football program through the transition to the SEC and has the distinction of being South Carolina's first head coach in SEC play, as the Gamecocks entered the conference in 1992. Woods' overall record at South Carolina was 25–27–3.

=== Brad Scott era (1994–1998) ===
Brad Scott left his post as offensive coordinator at Florida State and took over as the Gamecocks head coach in December 1993. Despite modest preseason expectations, he led USC to a 7–5 record and a Carquest Bowl victory over West Virginia in his first season. The bowl win was the first post-season victory in the program's long history. However, Scott was unable to capitalize on his early success. USC only had one non-losing record in SEC play during his tenure, only one other winning overall record, and won only six games in his final two seasons. Scott was fired by athletics director Mike McGee after a 1–10 season in 1998 in which the Gamecocks lost their final ten games of the season. Scott's final record at South Carolina was 23–32–1 in five seasons.

=== Lou Holtz era (1999–2004) ===
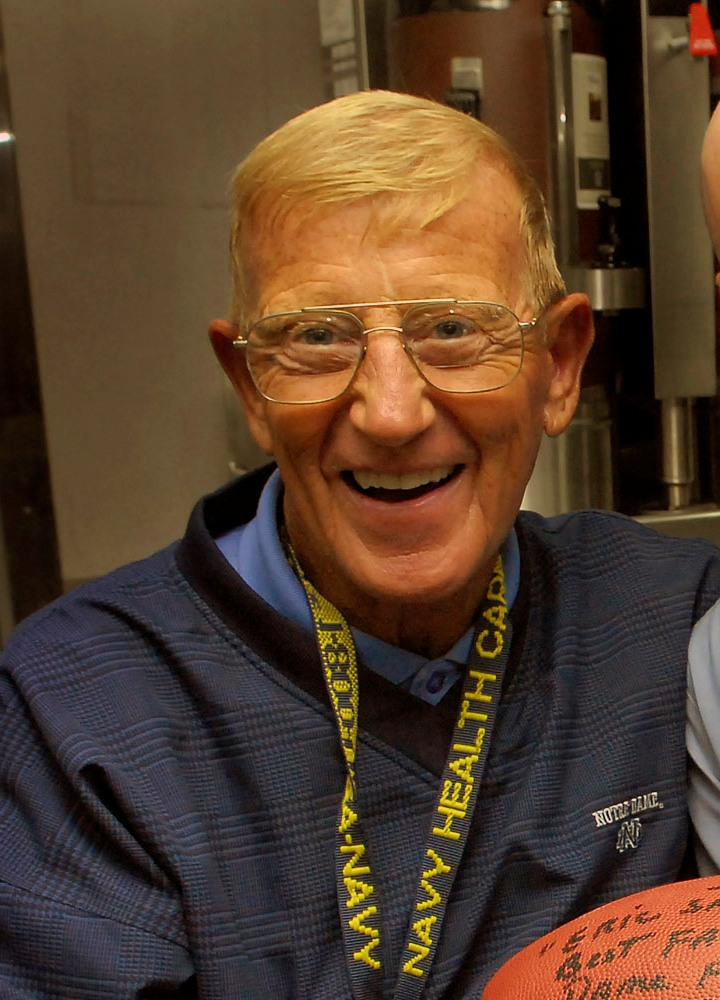
Lou Holtz

Former Notre Dame head coach Lou Holtz came out of retirement and was hired as USC's head coach in 1999. He inherited a relatively young SEC program (joined in 1992) that posted only three winning seasons from 1990 to 1998. USC won just a single game the year before Holtz's arrival and, subsequently, went 0–11 in his inaugural campaign.

It didn't take long for Holtz to improve the Gamecocks' fortunes, however, as he engineered 8–4 and 9–3 records in the 2000 and 2001 seasons. In addition, USC won consecutive Outback Bowls over Ohio State and produced the most successful two-year run in program history (at the time), going 17–7 overall and 10–6 in SEC play. The 2000 and 2001 campaigns also saw USC's return to the polls, as the Gamecocks turned in No. 19 and No. 13 rankings in the Final AP ballots for those years. After consecutive 5–7 finishes in 2002 and 2003 (in which the team was ranked in the Top 25 during both seasons), Holtz ended his USC tenure on a winning note with a 6–5 record in 2004 before retiring again. Holtz finished with a 33–37 overall record at South Carolina.

In 2005, USC was placed on 3 years probation by the NCAA for actions during the coaching tenure of Lou Holtz, all of which were self-reported by the school. Five of these actions were considered major violations, and included such activities as impermissible tutoring and non-voluntary summer workouts as well as a "lack of institutional control". Coach Holtz pointed out following the close of the investigation, "There was no money involved. No athletes were paid. There were no recruiting inducements. No cars. No jobs offered. No ticket scandal, etc."

=== Steve Spurrier era (2005–2015) ===
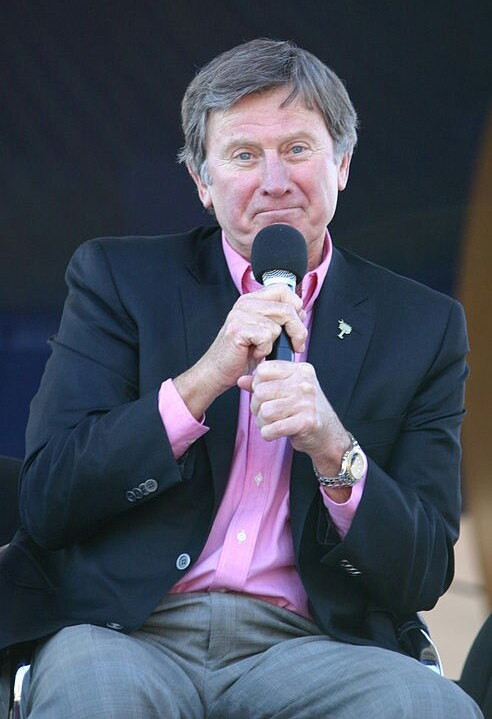
Steve Spurrier

Former Washington Redskins and Florida head coach Steve Spurrier was hired in 2005 to replace the retiring Lou Holtz. Spurrier led the Gamecocks to a 7–5 record and Independence Bowl appearance in his first season. As a result, Spurrier was named the 2005 SEC Coach of the Year. The 2006 season saw an 8–5 record and a victory over Houston in the Liberty Bowl. In 2007, the Gamecocks started the season 6–1, but would lose all of their next five games. South Carolina posted consecutive 7–6 records in 2008 and 2009, returning to postseason play with appearances in the Outback Bowl and PapaJohns.com Bowl. They also defeated a Top 5 opponent for the first time ever in 2009 when they upset then-No. 4 Ole Miss 16–10 at home on a Thursday night.

In 2010, Spurrier scored another first with the first SEC Eastern Division Championship in school history and the program's first win over a No. 1 team in program history, with a 35–21 victory over top-ranked, defending national champion Alabama. In 2011, Spurrier led USC to its most successful season in program history. The Gamecocks posted an 11–2 overall record, went 6–2 in SEC play, and defeated No. 20 Nebraska in the Capital One Bowl to earn Final Top 10 rankings in the AP and Coaches' Polls (No. 9 and No. 8, respectively). The University of South Carolina was investigated in 2011–12 by the NCAA regarding an estimated $59,000 in impermissible benefits provided to student-athletes including football players including discounted living expenses at a local hotel. The school imposed its own punishment, paying $18,500 in fines and cutting three football scholarships in each of the 2013 and 2014 seasons, and reduction in official recruiting visits for the 2012–13 year. The NCAA accepted these self-imposed punishments.

In 2012 Steve Spurrier, once again, led his South Carolina football team to double-digit wins during the course of the regular season campaign. The 2012 regular season culminated with the annual season-ending game against arch-rival Clemson at Clemson's Memorial Stadium. In 2013, Spurrier and the Gamecocks finished with another extremely successful 11–2 season capped by a 34–22 victory over the No. 19 Wisconsin in the 2014 Capital One Bowl. South Carolina finished with the highest ranking in school history in the AP poll, ranked at No. 4 in the country.

On October 12, 2015, after a 2–4 start to the season, Spurrier announced to his team that he would be resigning, effective immediately. Offensive line coach/co-offensive coordinator Shawn Elliott was named the team's interim head coach. Elliott led the Gamecocks to victory the following week against Vanderbilt but lost the final five games of the season. Many of South Carolina's most successful seasons came during the Steve Spurrier era, including a SEC East Division championship in 2010 and three consecutive eleven win seasons (2011–13). Spurrier also boasted a 6–4 record against the school's in-state rival, Clemson, including five consecutive wins during the 2009–2013 seasons.

=== Will Muschamp era (2016–2020) ===
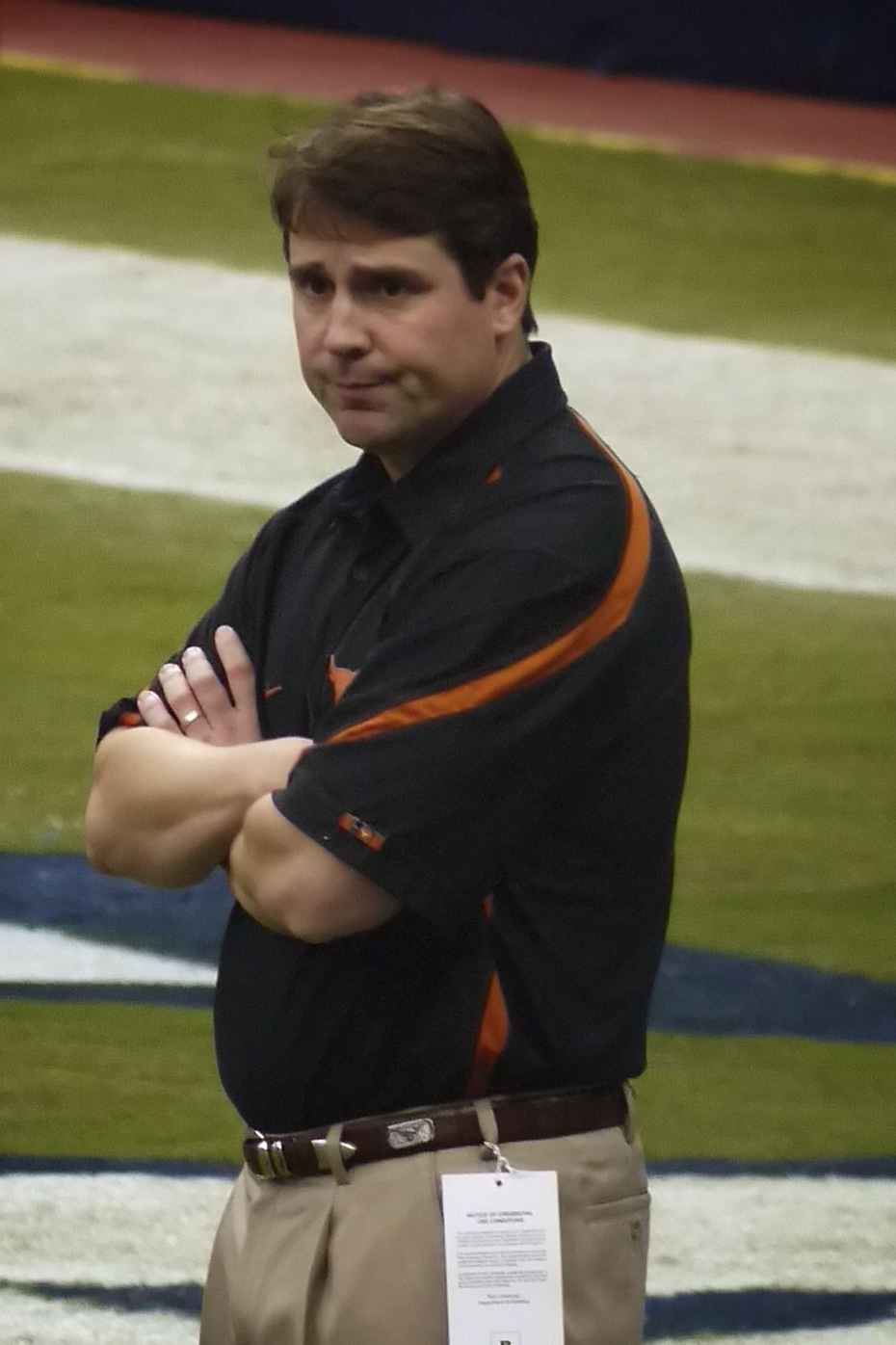
Will Muschamp

Auburn defensive coordinator and former Florida head coach Will Muschamp was named as South Carolina's new head coach on December 6, 2015.

The Will Muschamp era began with a victory over Vanderbilt by a score of 13–10. After a 2–4 start, Carolina won four of their final six regular season contests, including a 24–21 victory over 18th-ranked Tennessee. The Gamecocks' 2016 campaign ended with a 46–39 overtime loss to South Florida in the 2016 Birmingham Bowl. In 2017 Muschamp led the Gamecocks to a 9–4 season. The season started with a neutral site win against NC State in the Belk Kickoff Game in Charlotte, North Carolina. In conference play South Carolina defeated five SEC schools: Florida, Tennessee, Missouri, Vanderbilt, and Arkansas, finishing second in the SEC East. They finished the season with a 26–19 victory over Michigan in the Outback Bowl. The 2018 season saw Muschamp and the Gamecocks finish with a 7–5 regular season finish and a 28–0 loss to Virginia in the Belk Bowl in Charlotte, NC. South Carolina finished the 2019 season with a mark of 4–8, highlighted by a road upset over Georgia.

The 2020 season was played with a conference-only schedule, due to the ongoing COVID-19 pandemic. The Gamecocks started off the season 2-2, with a win over then No. 15 Auburn. The Gamecocks then lost three straight, allowing 159 points in the process. Muschamp was dismissed as head coach on November 15, 2020, after starting the 2020 season with a 2–5 record with Mike Bobo being named interim head coach for the rest of the season.

=== Shane Beamer era (2021–present) ===
On December 6, 2020, University of South Carolina athletic director Ray Tanner announced that the school had hired Oklahoma associate head coach/tight ends coach Shane Beamer as its head coach. Beamer, the son of legendary Virginia Tech head coach Frank Beamer, led the 2021 Gamecocks to a 7–6 record, including a 38–21 win in the Duke's Mayo Bowl over North Carolina.

The Gamecocks' 2022 season displayed significant growth under Shane Beamer's leadership in his second year as head coach. Despite inconsistent offensive line play and a lackluster rush defense throughout the season, the Gamecocks finished on a high note, posting an 8–5 record and finishing the season ranked at No. 23 in both the Coaches and AP poll, their first top 25 finish since the 2013 season. Additionally, Shane Beamer became the first coach in program history to win back-to-back games against top ten opponents after beating #5 Tennessee and their in-state rival #8 Clemson in weeks 12 and 13, respectively. South Carolina's dominant 63–38 victory against Tennessee set the record for most points scored by an unranked team against a top-five team in college football history. During that game, South Carolina quarterback Spencer Rattler gave a legendary performance, throwing for 438 passing yards, six touchdowns, and zero interceptions, breaking the school record for most touchdown passes in a single game. The Gamecocks were invited to play against the #21 Notre Dame Fighting Irish in the TaxSlayer Gator Bowl. Although South Carolina played a competitive game with a relatively depleted roster, they ultimately lost to the Irish by a score of 45–38.

The 2023 season saw a setback in the trajectory of the program. Despite quarterback Spencer Rattler and wide receiver Xavier Legette having two of the best individual seasons in school history in their final college year, the team was noted by the media for being heavily affected by injuries, particularly from the offensive line. South Carolina finished sixth in the final SEC East, with an overall record of 5–7, missing a bowl game for the first time since 2020.

In 2024, despite media outlets projecting a 13th place finish in the SEC and a middling 3-3 start, the team reeled off six straight wins - its first 6-game win streak since 2013 - to finish the regular season with a 9-3 record, and the first winning record in conference play since 2017. Season highlights included a dominant 44-20 victory against No. 10 Texas A&M at home, a thrilling 4-point victory over No. 23 Missouri at home, and a 17-14 road victory against their archrival, No. 12 Clemson. At the conclusion of the year, Beamer was awarded SEC Coach of the year by the Associated Press and USA Today.

== Conference affiliations ==
South Carolina joined the Southeastern Conference in 1992.

South Carolina has affiliated with three conferences and twice been an independent.

- Independent (1892–1921)
- Southern Conference (1922–1952)
- Atlantic Coast Conference (1953–1970)
- Independent (1971–1991)
- Southeastern Conference (1992–present)

== Head coaches ==
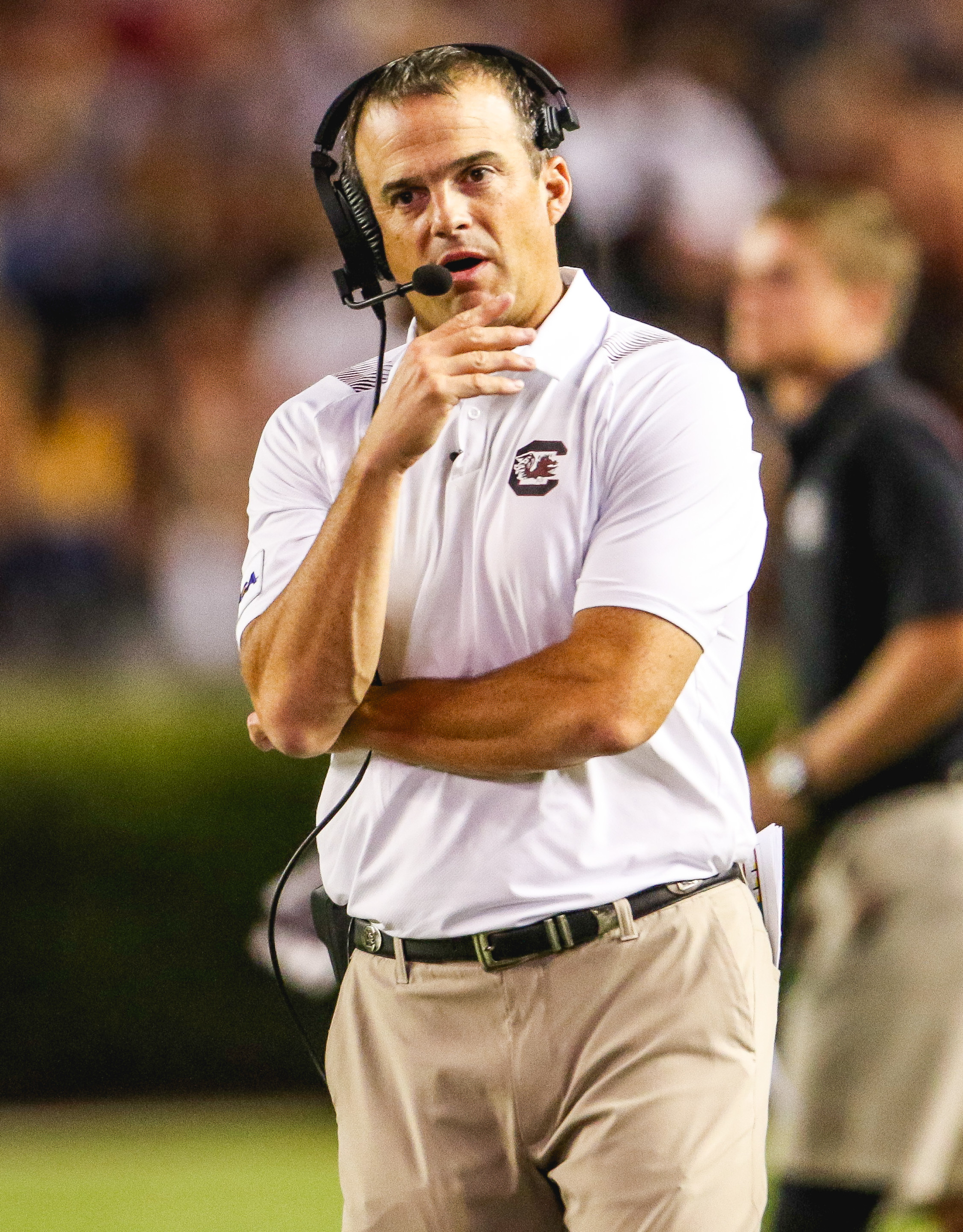
Current Gamecock head coach Shane Beamer

South Carolina has had 36 head coaches. Shane Beamer became head coach in 2020.

Coach	Years	Season	Record	Pct.
No coach	1892–1895	4	2–4	.333
Richard S. Whaley	1896	1	1–3	.250
Frederick M. Murphy	1897	1	0–3	.000
Bill Wertenbaker	1898	1	1–2	.333
Irving O. Hunt	1899–1900	2	6–6	.500
Byron W. Dickson	1901	1	3–4	.429
Bob Williams	1902–1903	2	14–3	.824
Christie Benet	1904–1905, 1908–1909	4	13–16–3	.453
No team	1906			
Douglas McKay	1907	1	3–0	1.000
John Neff	1910–1911	2	5–8–2	.400
Norman B. Edgerton	1912–1915	4	19–13–3	.586
W. Rice Warren	1916	1	2–7	.222
Dixon Foster	1917, 1919	2	4–12–1	.265
Frank Dobson	1918	1	2–1–1	.625
Sol Metzger	1920–1924	5	26–18–2	.587
Branch Bocock	1925–1926	2	13–7	.650
Harry Lightsey	1927	1	4–5	.500
Billy Laval	1928–1934	7	39–26–6	.592
Don McCallister	1935–1937	3	13–20–1	.397
Rex Enright	1938–1942, 1946–1955	5, 10	64–69–7	.482
James Moran Sr.	1943	1	5–2	.714
Williams Newton	1944	1	3–4–2	.444
John D. McMillan	1945	1	2–4–3	.389
Warren Giese	1956–1960	5	28–21–1	.570
Marvin Bass	1961–1965	5	17–29–4	.380
Paul Dietzel	1966–1974	9	42–53–1	.443
Jim Carlen	1975–1981	7	45–36–1	.555
Richard Bell	1982	1	4–7	.364
Joe Morrison	1983–1988	6	39–28–2	.580
Sparky Woods	1989–1993	5	24–28–3	.464
Brad Scott	1994–1998	5	23–32–1	.420
Lou Holtz	1999–2004	6	33–37	.471
Steve Spurrier	2005–2015	11	86–49	.637
Shawn Elliott †	2015	1	1–5	.167
Will Muschamp	2016–2020	5	28–30	.483
Mike Bobo †	2020	1	0–3	.000
Shane Beamer	2021–present	5	33–30	.524

† Interim

== Championships ==
=== Conference championships ===
South Carolina has won four conference championships. However, the SoCon does not recognize South Carolina as having won the league in 1933 and 1941. The 1965 team won the ACC on the field but due to sanctions that saw them forfeit four ACC wins.

Season	Conference	Coach	Overall Record	Conference Record
1933§	SoCon	Billy Laval	6–3-1	3–0
1941§	SoCon	Rex Enright	4–4-1	4–0-1
1965§	ACC	Marvin Bass	5-5	4-2
1969	ACC	Paul Dietzel	7–4	6–0

=== Division championships ===
The SEC was split into two divisions from 1992 to 2023, with the Gamecocks competing in the SEC East in that time.

Season	Division	Opponent	SEC CG Result
2010	SEC East	Auburn	L 17–56

== Bowl games ==
South Carolina has 26 bowl appearances, with a 10–16 record overall.

No.	Season	Coach	Bowl	Opponent	Result
1	1945	John D. McMillan	Gator Bowl	Wake Forest	L 14–26
2	1969	Paul Dietzel	Peach Bowl	West Virginia	L 3–14
3	1975	Jim Carlen	Tangerine Bowl	Miami (OH)	L 7–20
4	1979	Jim Carlen	Hall of Fame Classic	Missouri	L 14–24
5	1980	Jim Carlen	Gator Bowl (2)	Pittsburgh	L 9–37
6	1984	Joe Morrison	Gator Bowl (3)	Oklahoma State	L 14–21
7	1987	Joe Morrison	Gator Bowl (4)	LSU	L 13–30
8	1988	Joe Morrison	Liberty Bowl	Indiana	L 10–34
9	1994	Brad Scott	Carquest Bowl	West Virginia (2)	W 24–21
10	2000	Lou Holtz	Outback Bowl	Ohio State	W 24–7
11	2001	Lou Holtz	Outback Bowl (2)	Ohio State (2)	W 31–28
12	2005	Steve Spurrier	Independence Bowl	Missouri (2)	L 31–38
13	2006	Steve Spurrier	Liberty Bowl (2)	Houston	W 44–36
14	2008	Steve Spurrier	Outback Bowl (3)	Iowa	L 10–31
15	2009	Steve Spurrier	PapaJohns.com Bowl	Connecticut	L 7–20
16	2010	Steve Spurrier	Chick-fil-A Bowl (2)	Florida State	L 17–26
17	2011	Steve Spurrier	Capital One Bowl (2)	Nebraska	W 30–13
18	2012	Steve Spurrier	Outback Bowl (4)	Michigan	W 33–28
19	2013	Steve Spurrier	Capital One Bowl (3)	Wisconsin	W 34–24
20	2014	Steve Spurrier	Independence Bowl (2)	Miami (FL)	W 24–21
21	2016	Will Muschamp	Birmingham Bowl (2)	South Florida	L 39–46 ^{OT}
22	2017	Will Muschamp	Outback Bowl (5)	Michigan (2)	W 26–19
23	2018	Will Muschamp	Belk Bowl	Virginia	L 0–28
24	2021	Shane Beamer	Duke's Mayo Bowl (2)	North Carolina	W 38–21
25	2022	Shane Beamer	Gator Bowl (5)	Notre Dame	L 38–45
26	2024	Shane Beamer	Citrus Bowl (4)	Illinois	L 17–21

== Rivalries ==
=== Clemson ===
The rivalry is the largest annual sporting event by ticket sales in the state of South Carolina. From 1896 to 1959, the Carolina-Clemson game was played on the fairgrounds in Columbia, South Carolina, and was referred to as "Big Thursday." In 1960, an alternating-site format was implemented utilizing both teams' home stadiums. The annual game has since been officially designated "The Palmetto Bowl". It is the 21st most played college football rivalry at 120 meetings. The Gamecocks won 5 in a row against Clemson between 2009 and 2013, Clemson then won 7 straight, but failed to extend their win streak in the series with a 31–30 loss in 2022. Clemson holds a 73–44-4 all-time lead in the series as of the conclusion of the 2024 season. The South Carolina Gamecocks did not play the Clemson Tigers in 2020 due to COVID-19 restrictions.

=== Georgia ===
A "border rivalry" dating to 1894, the Gamecocks and Bulldogs have met 76 times on the gridiron. The 1980 game was between future Heisman Trophy winners George Rogers and Herschel Walker. Led by Walker's 219 rushing yards, Georgia won 13–10 and would go on to capture the National Championship. Rogers turned in 168 rushing yards during the course of the battle, setting the stage for a successful finish to his senior season and eventual Heisman Trophy award. The matchup has been televised yearly since 1997. The series has been far more competitive since USC joined the SEC in 1992. Georgia holds a 55–19–2 overall lead in the series as of the 2023 season.

=== Missouri ===
The "Mayor's Cup" is a budding rivalry between the two schools located in cities named Columbia. The Tigers lead the all-time series 10–6. Although Missouri is the only school to beat the Gamecocks in multiple bowl games, the rivalry began in 2012, when Missouri joined South Carolina in the SEC East. A Mayor's Cup trophy is awarded to the winner of the annual game by the mayors of Columbia, South Carolina and Columbia, Missouri.

=== Florida ===
Though South Carolina was the first team in today's Southeastern Conference that Florida ever played, the two teams only played intermittently from 1911 through 1939. The Gators and Gamecocks eventually became annual opponents when South Carolina joined the SEC in 1992. Slowly, a rivalry developed as the Gamecocks made a habit of hiring former Florida coaches to lead their program, first with Steve Spurrier from 2005–2015, and then again with Will Muschamp from 2016–2020. Despite Florida holding a commanding 31–11-3 all time series lead, this matchup has nevertheless produced many unforgettable games, the first of which featured Spurrier's Gamecocks denying Florida an SEC East Championship in 2005 with a 30-22 upset. The following year, Florida needed to block Ryan Succop's potential game-winning field goal to keep their BCS Championship hopes alive, and the year after that, Florida's Tim Tebow accounted for seven touchdowns in a game that helped him win the Heisman Trophy. In 2010, Spurrier again led the Gamecocks past his former team to deny them a trip to the SEC Championship Game, this time claiming the SEC East themselves with the program's first ever win in Gainesville. More recent memorable games include South Carolina blocking a field goal and then a punt to force overtime before winning 23–20 in 2014, Florida erasing a 31–14 third-quarter deficit in a shocking 35–31 comeback win in 2018, and Florida storming back from 37–27 down with ten minutes to go and winning 41–39 on a touchdown pass from Graham Mertz to Ricky Pearsall in the final minute in 2023.

=== Kentucky ===
South Carolina and Kentucky have played each other 38 times, with the Gamecocks holding a 22–15-1 lead in the rivalry. The series has been played for 35 consecutive seasons, dating back to 1992 when South Carolina joined the SEC. Both programs were members of the SEC's East Division, and they have continued to be yearly opponents following the conference's disbanding of division play. The series has been marked by a large number of close contests, dating back to the 1990's.

=== North Carolina ===
The rivalry began in 1903. While no longer a conference rivalry, since South Carolina left the ACC in 1971, the teams still meet occasionally. In the 2010s, the series had been played primarily on a Thursday. It was announced in September 2015 that USC and UNC will play every four years in 2019 and 2023. While North Carolina leads the all-time series 36–20–4 and won the most recent matchup, the Gamecocks have led the series 10-8 since 1971, when the Gamecocks left the ACC.

=== NC State ===
The NC State–South Carolina football rivalry is an American college football rivalry between the NC State Wolfpack and South Carolina Gamecocks. South Carolina leads the series 28–26–4. Both schools were in the Atlantic Coast Conference (ACC) until 1971; they met annually from 1923 to 1935 and 1956 to 1991 (they didn't meet in 1967), when South Carolina was invited to the SEC. Since South Carolina joined the SEC, they have met only four times.

=== Texas A&M ===
The "Bonham Trophy" rivalry between South Carolina and Texas A&M has been played every year since 2014, with the Aggies holding a 9–2 lead. The trophy is named after South Carolina native James Butler Bonham, who attended the University of South Carolina from 1824–1827 (known then as South Carolina College) and died at the Battle of the Alamo.

== Notable seasons ==
=== 1933 – Undefeated in the Southern Conference ===
In 1933, under the direction of the legendary Billy Laval, the Gamecocks went undefeated in conference play. However, Duke would finish with a better conference record by one win and was awarded the championship.

=== 1969 – ACC champions ===
In 1969, the Gamecocks won the ACC Championship by going undefeated in conference play. In its six ACC matchups, USC outscored its opponents by a 130–61 margin. The squad posted a 7–4 overall record with a Peach Bowl appearance against West Virginia to close the season (14–3 loss). Two years later, South Carolina left the ACC and competed as an Independent for two decades before joining the SEC in 1992.

=== 1980 – Heisman Trophy ===
In 1980, the Gamecocks had a successful season led by running back George Rogers, who won the prestigious Heisman Trophy and was chosen #1 overall in the 1981 NFL draft. The team finished 8–4, with the biggest win coming against the eventual Big Ten champion Michigan Wolverines in front of a crowd of over 104,000 at Michigan Stadium.

=== 1984 – "Black Magic" ===
Led by Coach Morrison, the 1984 Gamecocks became the first team in school history to win 10 games (10–2 record) and were ranked as high as No. 2 in the polls before losing to an unranked Navy team 38–21 in the 10th game of the season. The Gamecocks finished No. 11 in the final AP Poll. Along the way, they defeated Georgia, Pittsburgh, Notre Dame, Florida State, and Clemson to earn an appearance in the Gator Bowl against Oklahoma State (21–14 loss). At the time, the No. 11 final ranking was the highest ever achieved by South Carolina. The team was nicknamed "Black Magic" due to their success and their distinctive black jerseys.

=== 2000 – Winless to Top 25 ===
South Carolina made one of the biggest turnarounds in college football history, going from a winless season in 1999 to an eight-win campaign in 2000. Their first win of the season, against New Mexico State, came two years to the day after their previous win, against Ball State on September 2, 1998. South Carolina's turnaround in conference play was also one of the biggest in SEC history, going from 0–8 in 1999, to 5–3 in 2000 including a victory against a heavily favored Georgia team that ended the Gamecocks' SEC losing streak. South Carolina fans tore down the goalposts at Williams-Brice Stadium on both occasions in celebration. On New Year's Day 2001, the Gamecocks defeated Ohio State in the Outback Bowl in Tampa, Florida. South Carolina finished the season ranked #19 in the AP Poll and #21 in the Coaches Poll.

=== 2010 – SEC East champions ===
In 2010, the Gamecocks won their first SEC Eastern Division Championship, going 5–3 in conference play. For the first time in school history, they defeated the No. 1 ranked team in the country (Alabama) and won at Florida in the division-clinching game. The season also included victories over division foes Georgia, Tennessee, and Vanderbilt as well as instate Atlantic Coast Conference rival Clemson. In their first appearance in the SEC Championship Game, the Gamecocks lost to No. 1 Auburn, 56–17.

=== 2011 – First 11-Win Season ===
Led by Coach Spurrier, the 2011 Gamecocks achieved its most wins in a single season and finished in the Top 10 for the first time in program history. USC posted an 11–2 overall record, went 6–2 in SEC play, and won the Capital One Bowl to finish No. 9/8 in the final AP and Coaches' Polls (respectively). Along the way, USC defeated Georgia, Tennessee, Florida, and Clemson to extend its winning streak over its biggest rivals to 3 games. This was also the first season that USC posted a 5–0 record against their SEC Eastern Division opponents.

=== 2012 – Back-to-Back 11-Win Seasons ===
Spurrier's 2012 Gamecocks went 11–2, with their only losses coming at LSU and at Florida in consecutive weeks. USC defeated rival Clemson 27–17 in Death Valley to end the regular season. They then defeated Michigan 33–28 in the 2013 Outback Bowl with the game decided by a 28-yard touchdown pass from Dylan Thompson to Bruce Ellington with under a minute to go. The Gamecocks finished the season ranked No. 8/7 in the final AP and Coaches' Polls respectively.

=== 2013 – 3 in a Row 11-Win Seasons ===
Again led by Coach Spurrier, the 2013 Gamecocks went 11–2, with their losses coming at Georgia and at Tennessee. Notable wins included Vanderbilt, UCF, and Missouri all of which finished ranked in the top 25. USC finished the regular season by defeating rival Clemson 31–17, marking Carolina's fifth straight win over their in-state rival. This was also the first Palmetto Bowl between top ten teams, with Carolina and Clemson ranked No. 10 and No. 6 respectively. South Carolina also completed their second consecutive season with an undefeated record on their home field, Williams–Brice Stadium. The Gamecocks' 18 game home win streak, dating back to the 2011 season, was good for the longest home winning streak in the nation at the time. The team ended the season with a 34–24 victory over Wisconsin in the 2014 Capital One Bowl. The Gamecocks finished the season ranked No. 4 in both the final AP and Coaches' polls, marking the first top five finish in program history.

=== 2022 – Return to the Top 25 ===
The Gamecocks posted an 8–5 record and finished the season ranked at No. 23 in both the Coaches and AP poll, their first top 25 finish since the 2013 season. Shane Beamer became the first coach in program history to win back-to-back games against top ten opponents after beating #5 Tennessee and their in-state rival #8 Clemson. South Carolina's dominant 63–38 victory against Tennessee set the record for most points scored by an unranked team against a top-five team in college football history.

=== 2024 – SEC Coach of the Year ===
Predicted to win five games and finish thirteenth in the SEC, South Carolina achieved the eighth nine-win season in program history, finishing 4th in the conference. The Gamecocks recorded their first 5–3 conference record since 2017 and the first of Beamer's tenure. They defeated three conference opponents on the road for the first time since 2011. Shane Beamer broke the record for most wins in the first four seasons by a Gamecock head coach, and was named the SEC Coach of the Year.

Following a disappointing and controversial first half of the season, which saw close losses to LSU and Alabama as well as a blowout loss to Ole Miss, the Gamecocks won the last six games in the regular season. In this stretch, South Carolina defeated four straight conference opponents for the first time since 2005; (Note: The last time South Carolina defeated four consecutive conference opponents in nonconsecutive weeks was 2012. However, the last time South Carolina defeated four consecutive conference opponents in consecutive weeks (not counting bye weeks) was 2005, when they defeated five in a row.) they also defeated four ranked teams and won all three trophy games for the first time in program history. Two of those trophy games were decided by late-game touchdowns. The winning streak earned South Carolina consideration for the College Football Playoff, but they were instead selected to play Illinois in the Citrus Bowl, where they lost.

The Gamecocks were led by redshirt freshman quarterback LaNorris Sellers as well as a defense ranked among the best in the nation and school history. Senior Edge Rusher Kyle Kennard won the Bronko Nagurski Trophy, honoring him as the top defensive player in college football, and was a finalist for the Lombardi Award. Dylan Stewart was named a finalist for the Shaun Alexander Freshman of the Year Award. Following the regular season, Sellers received consideration as one of the best players in the country.

== Award winners & Finalists ==
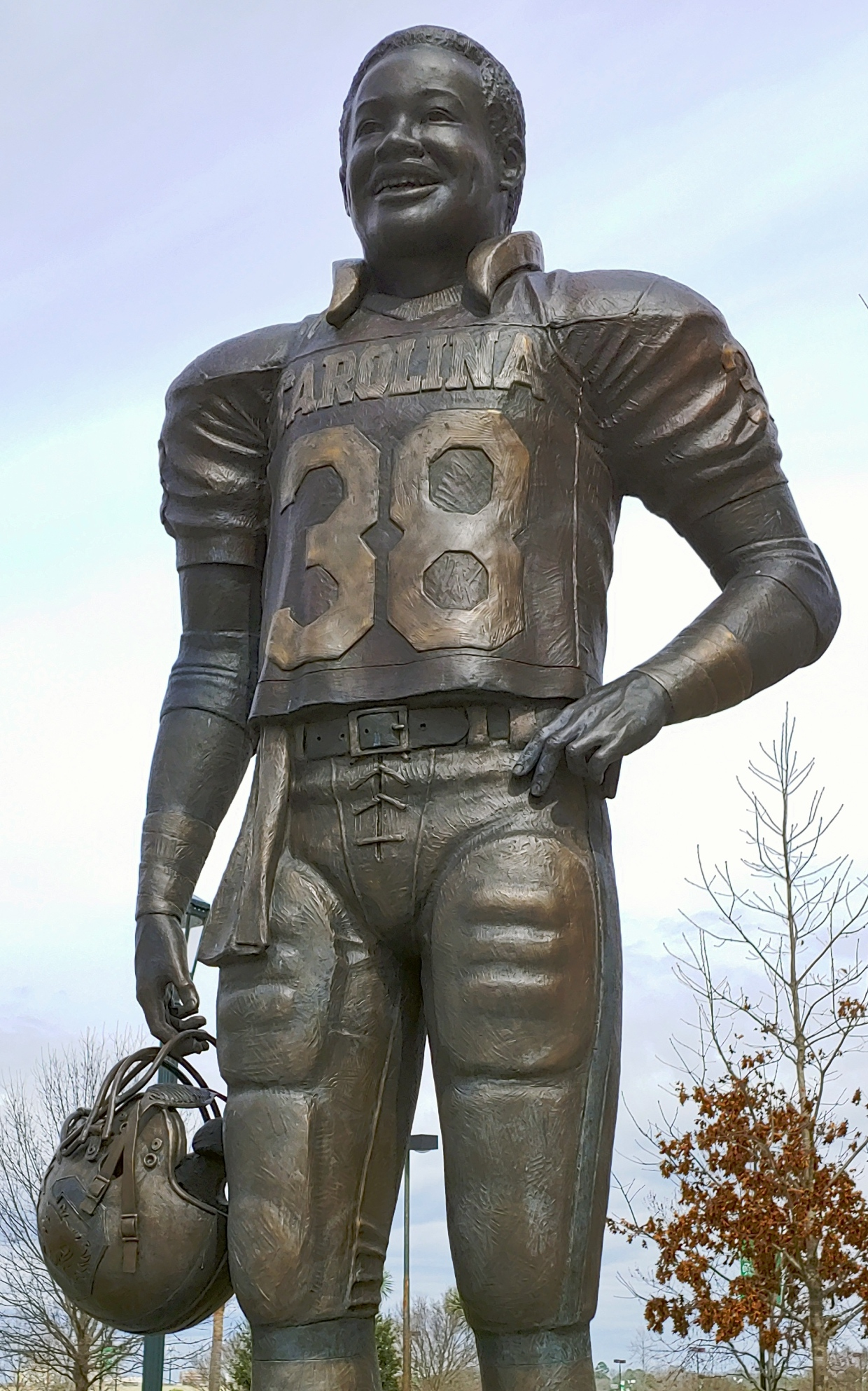
Statue of 1980 Heisman Trophy winner George Rogers

- Heisman Trophy
  - George Rogers – 1980 (Winner)
  - Jadeveon Clowney – 2012 (Finished 6th in Heisman Voting)
  - Sterling Sharpe – 1987 (Received Votes)
- Consensus All-Americans
  - George Rogers – 1980
  - Del Wilkes – 1984
  - Melvin Ingram – 2011
  - Jadeveon Clowney – 2012
  - Kyle Kennard - 2024
- All-Americans - 47
- Chic Harley Award
  - George Rogers – 1980
- Walter Camp Coach of the Year Award
  - Joe Morrison – 1984
- Southern Conference Player of the Year
  - Steve Wadiak – 1950
- Atlantic Coast Conference Coach of the Year
  - Paul Dietzel – 1969
- Independent Coach of the Year
  - Joe Morrison – 1987
- Atlantic Coast Conference Player of the Year
  - Alex Hawkins – 1958
  - Billy Gambrell – 1962
- Southeastern Conference Coach of the Year
  - Lou Holtz – 2000
  - Steve Spurrier – 2005, 2010
  - Shane Beamer – 2024
- Walter Camp Alumni of the Year
  - George Rogers – 2004
- Disney Spirit Award
  - Tim Frisby – 2004
- Sporting News Freshman of the Year
  - Marcus Lattimore – 2010
- Southeastern Conference Freshman of the Year
  - Steve Taneyhill – 1992
  - Ko Simpson – 2004
  - Marcus Lattimore – 2010
  - Jadeveon Clowney – 2011
  - LaNorris Sellers – 2024
- Southeastern Conference Defensive Player of the Year
  - Jadeveon Clowney - 2012
  - Kyle Kennard - 2024
- Southeastern Conference Special Teams Player of the Year
  - Ace Sanders - 2012
- Ted Hendricks Award
  - Jadeveon Clowney – 2012
- AT&T ESPN All-America Player of the Year
  - Jadeveon Clowney – 2012
- South Carolina Football Hall of Fame Blanchard-Rogers Trophy
  - Kevin Harris – 2021
- ESPY Award for Best Play
  - Jadeveon Clowney – 2013
- FWAA First-Year Coach of the Year
  - Steve Spurrier – 2005
  - Shane Beamer – 2021
- Bronko Nagurski Award
  - Kyle Kennard - 2024
- National Freshman Offensive Player of the Year (FWAA)
  - LaNorris Sellers – 2024
- National Comeback Player of the Year
  - Raheim Sanders – 2024

== College Football Hall of Famers ==
Inductee	Position	Class	Year(s)	Ref.
George Rogers	RB	1997	1977–1980	
Lou Holtz	Head coach	2008	1999–2004	
Sterling Sharpe	WR	2014	1983–1987	
Steve Spurrier	Head coach	2017	2005–2015	

== Pro Football Hall of Famers ==
Inductee	Position	Class	Year(s)	Ref.
Sterling Sharpe	WR	2025	1983–1987	

== Syvelle Newton joins the "600 Club" ==
From 2003 to 2006, Syvelle Newton played multiple positions for the Gamecocks and left his mark on the national record books in the process. He became one of only four players in college football history to record 600+ yards passing, rushing, and receiving (each) in a collegiate career. In Newton's four seasons, he posted 2,474 passing yards (20 TD, 13 INT), 786 rushing yards (10 TD), and 673 receiving yards (3 TD). He also returned 6 kickoffs for 115 yards (19.2 average) and made 18 tackles and an assisted sack in limited defensive action.

== Traditions ==
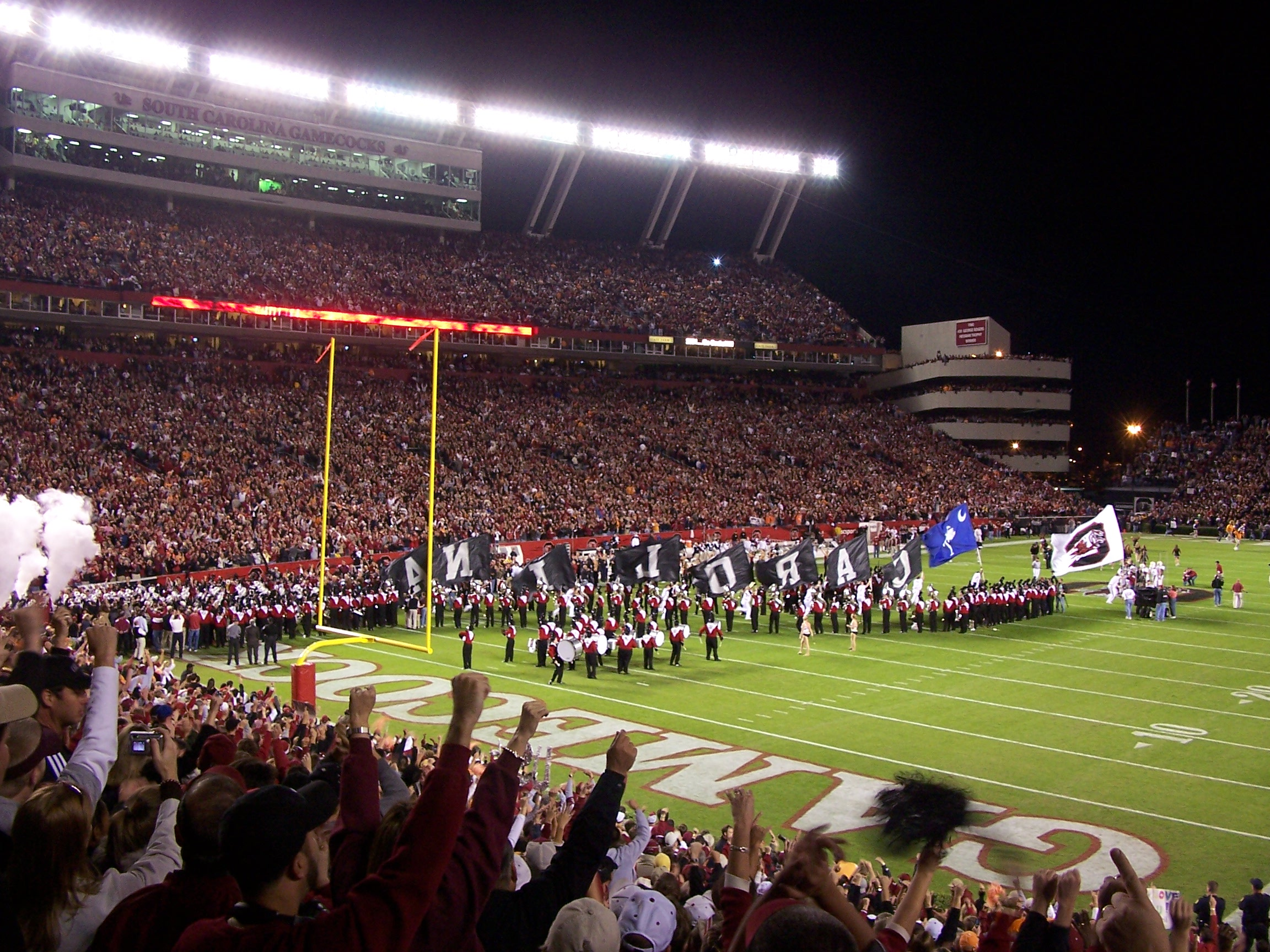
South Carolina entering the stadium

- "2001" Entrance – The Gamecocks enter Williams–Brice Stadium to the introduction of Also sprach Zarathustra, popularly known from the film 2001: A Space Odyssey. This tradition was started by Coach Joe Morrison with his first game in 1983. It is often considered one of the best entrances in college football.
- Cockaboose Railroad – In 1990, cabooses renovated in Gamecock colors and decor became part of the USC tailgate scene. They sit on a dormant railroad track near Williams–Brice Stadium.
- "If It Ain't Swayin', Then We Ain't Playin" – Originating from a Joe Morrison comment about the reported "swaying" of the Williams–Brice Stadium upper deck during a 38–14 win over Southern California in 1983, "if it ain't swayin', we ain't playin'" became a catchphrase for Carolina fans, even after the East Upper Deck of Williams–Brice Stadium had additional supports added to reduce the swaying.
- Sir Big Spur – Sir Big Spur (originally called Cocky Doodle Lou), the university's official live gamecock, attends USC football games.
- Cocky – Cocky has been the USC mascot since 1980. Cocky is the four-time "national champion", five-time "All-American" mascot & 2003 winner of the Capital One National Mascot of the Year for the Gamecocks. The "son" of Carolina's original mascot Big Spur, Cocky appears at every USC home football contest, making a "magical" appearance at the climax of the 2001 opening sequence.
- "Sandstorm" – Embraced by students in 2009, the song "Sandstorm" by Darude is played before South Carolina starts the game and after South Carolina is kicking the ball to the opposing team after a score; the song is stopped when the kicker makes contact with the football. As the song is played, fans wave white rally towels over their heads, make up-and-down motions and chant "USC" in rhythm. The song has been referred to as South Carolina's "unofficial anthem" and "second fight song".
- Tiger Burn – Before facing off their archrival Clemson, South Carolina holds the "Tiger Burn", a pep rally where a tiger statue built by students is burned down. This tradition began in 1902.
- Orange Crush – From 1993 to 2000, USC's final three regular season games were against Tennessee, Florida, and Clemson in that order. The term "Orange Crush" was used to describe this final stretch as all three teams wear orange and for its reputation as the most difficult portion of the season. Changes to schedule structure after 2000 meant that teams besides Tennessee and Florida were often the last two opponents before Clemson, slowly leading to the term's decline in usage. The term was revived and embraced by Shane Beamer in the 2022 season with the Gamecocks' final stretch against Florida, Tennessee, and Clemson. Though they failed to beat Florida, they ended their season on back-to-back upsets against Tennessee and Clemson, both of which were top 10 teams.

== Logos and uniforms ==
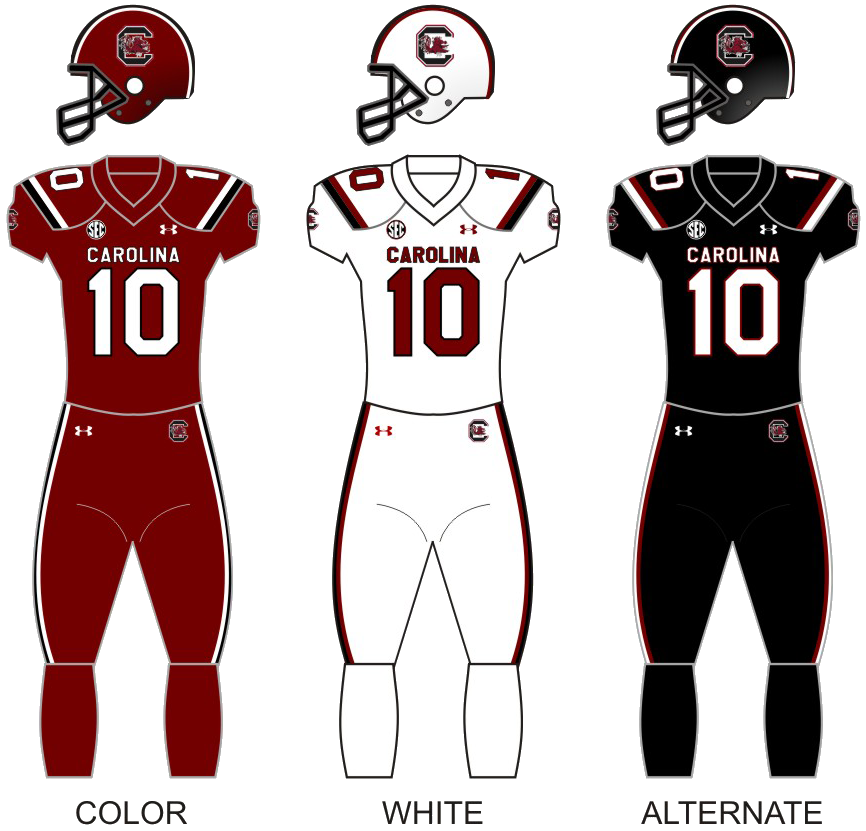

Garnet and black have been South Carolina's uniform colors of choice throughout the program's history. The gamecock first appeared on South Carolina's helmet in 1966, and has remained on the helmet in some form since 1969. Since 1975, South Carolina has used the 'Block C' primary logo on its helmets, and has intermittently featured the script "Carolina" and "Gamecocks" on the front of its jerseys. While the jersey used "Gamecocks" for much of the 1980s and early 1990s, it has solely used "Carolina" on its jersey since the late 1990s. Also, as South Carolina's flagship university, USC prominently displays the state flag, and imagery derived from it.

Since 2007, South Carolina has partnered with Under Armour as its official uniform supplier, replacing Russell Athletic. Under Armour has modified the Gamecocks' look several times, with altered piping, varying font sizes, et cetera. For example, before the 2013 season, a new uniform was unveiled with eleven total stripes, the same number of buildings on The Horseshoe, the most famous part of the South Carolina campus and a national historic landmark. In 2016, South Carolina signed a ten-year extension with Under Armour, which at the time was reportedly the second-most valuable deal in the SEC and seventh-most valuable in the nation. This deal will expire on June 30, 2026.

In support of the Wounded Warrior Project, USC wore a special uniform against Florida in 2009, against Auburn in 2011, and against LSU in 2012.

In several seasons, South Carolina has worn "throwback" uniforms, including homages to the 1980s in 2019, and to the 1980 season in 2024.

== Retired numbers ==
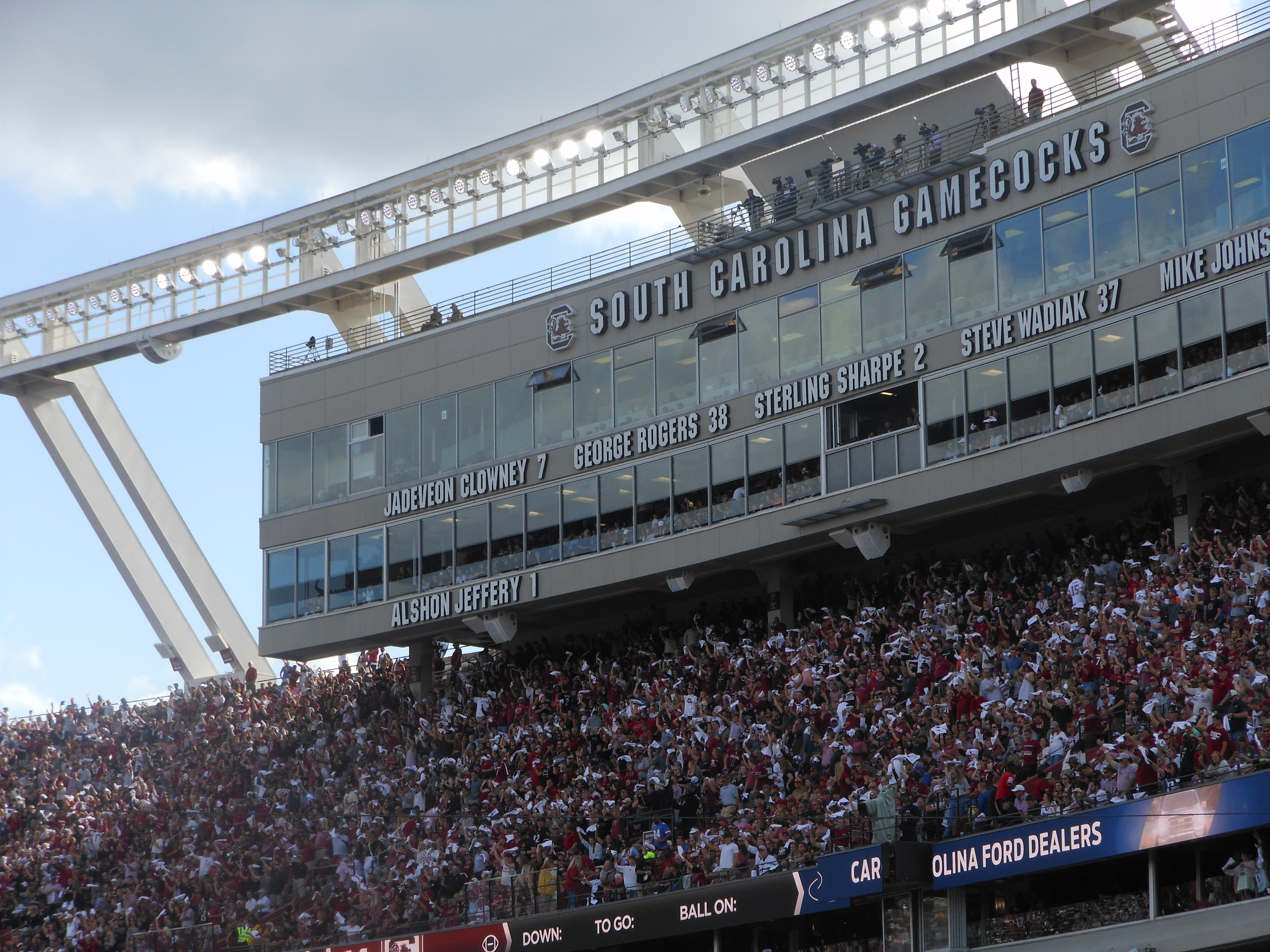
The press box at Williams-Brice Stadium with the names and numbers of players whose jerseys have been retired.

The University of South Carolina makes a distinction between retired jerseys and retired numbers. Since 2007, the current athletics department policy states that the school retires jerseys, not numbers. Numbers retired prior to 2007 will continue to be in a retired state, while current and future student-athletes can wear numbers that were affiliated with jersey retirements after 2007.

Four player numbers have been retired, while an additional two player jerseys have been retired.

South Carolina Gamecocks retired numbers
No.	Player	Pos.	Tenure	No. ret.	Ref.
2	Sterling Sharpe	WR	1984–1987	1987	
37	Steve Wadiak	HB	1948–1951	1951	
38	George Rogers	HB	1977–1980	1980	
56	Mike Johnson	C	1964	1965	

=== Retired jerseys ===
South Carolina Gamecocks retired jerseys
No.	Player	Pos.	Tenure	No. ret.	Ref.
1	Alshon Jeffery	WR	2009–2011	2023	
7	Jadeveon Clowney	DE	2011–2013	2022	

== Gamecocks in the NFL ==
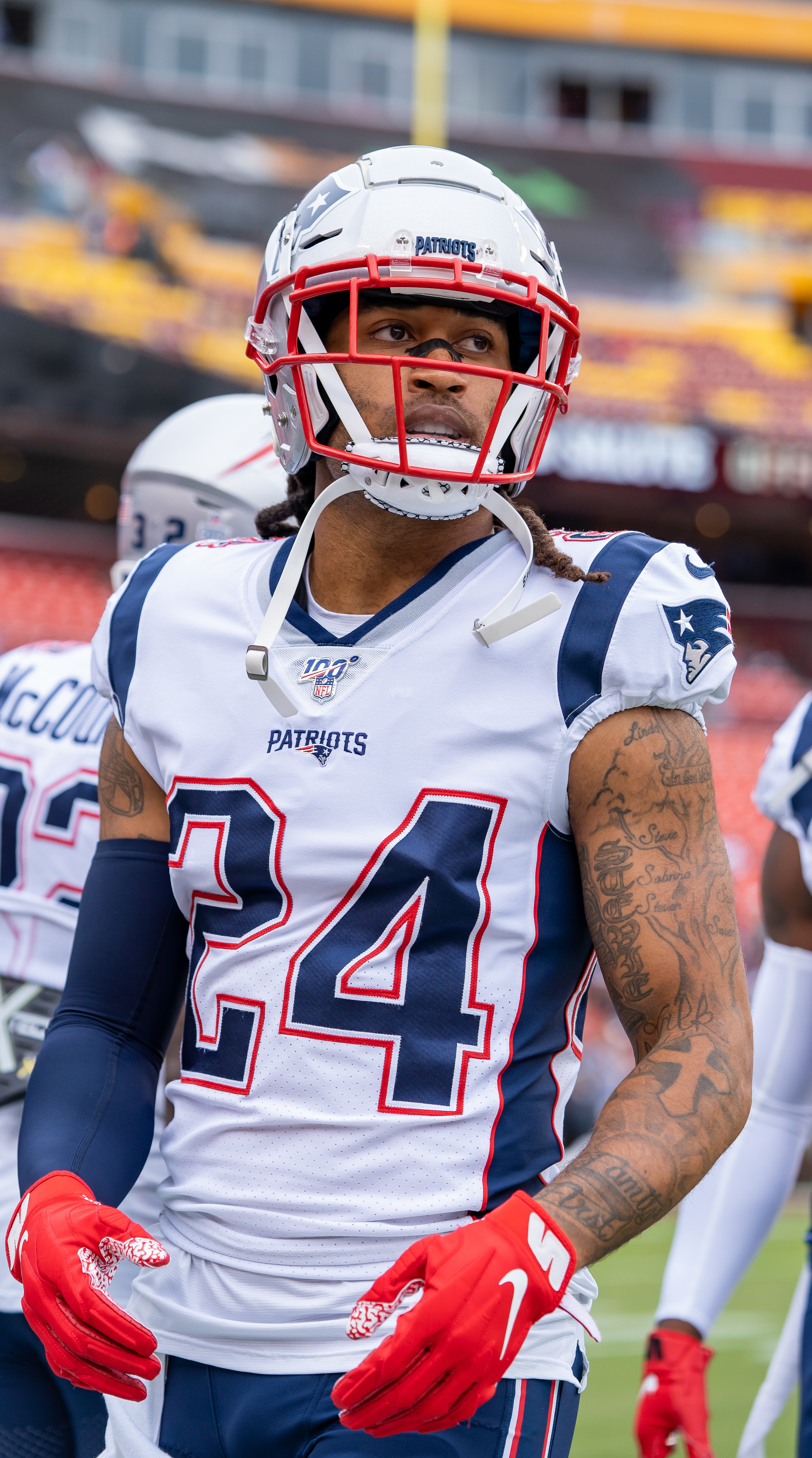
Stephon Gilmore is a Super Bowl champion and was named the 2019 Defensive Player of the Year

As of September 2023, South Carolina had 21 players on active rosters in the NFL, which ranked tied for 21st in the country.

The following is a list of Gamecock players in the NFL in any capacity (active rosters, practice squads, reserve lists, et cetera), as of September 2024.

- Nate Adkins, TE – Denver Broncos
- Jalen Brooks, WR – Dallas Cowboys
- Ahmarean Brown, WR – Buffalo Bills
- Jadeveon Clowney, LB – Carolina Panthers
- Marcellas Dial, CB – New England Patriots
- Rico Dowdle, RB – Carolina Panthers
- Kingsley Enagbare, OLB – Green Bay Packers
- Nick Gargiulo, OL – Denver Broncos
- Stephon Gilmore, CB – Minnesota Vikings
- Jovaughn Gwyn, G – Atlanta Falcons
- Kevin Harris, RB – New England Patriots
- Jaycee Horn, CB – Carolina Panthers
- Hayden Hurst, TE – Los Angeles Chargers
- Ernest Jones, LB – Seattle Seahawks
- Javon Kinlaw, DT – New York Jets
- Chris Lammons, CB – Indianapolis Colts
- Xavier Legette, WR – Carolina Panthers
- Dante Miller, RB – New York Giants
- Israel Mukuamu, S – Dallas Cowboys
- Nick Muse, TE – Minnesota Vikings
- Keisean Nixon, CB – Green Bay Packers
- Zacch Pickens, DT – Chicago Bears
- Adam Prentice, FB – New Orleans Saints
- Spencer Rattler, QB – New Orleans Saints
- Darius Rush, CB – Pittsburgh Steelers
- Deebo Samuel, WR – San Francisco 49ers
- Brandon Shell, OT – Buffalo Bills (Note: Shell retired from the NFL in 2023, but remains on the Bills' reserve/retired list, so the team retains his rights under the player's contract if he wishes to return.)
- Cam Smith, DB – Miami Dolphins
- D. J. Wonnum, DE – Carolina Panthers

=== List of Gamecock first-round draft picks ===
Sixteen Gamecock players have been selected in the first round of the NFL draft, which is 44th in the nation, as of 2024.

1. 1979: Rick Sanford, DB – New England Patriots
2. 1981: George Rogers, RB – New Orleans Saints
3. 1981: Willie Scott, TE – Kansas City Chiefs
4. 1988: Sterling Sharpe, WR – Green Bay Packers
5. 1993: Ernest Dye, T – Phoenix Cardinals
6. 2000: John Abraham, LB – New York Jets
7. 2004: Dunta Robinson, DB – Houston Texans
8. 2005: Troy Williamson, WR – Minnesota Vikings
9. 2006: Johnathan Joseph, DB – Cincinnati Bengals
10. 2012: Stephon Gilmore, DB – Buffalo Bills
11. 2012: Melvin Ingram, DE – San Diego Chargers
12. 2014: Jadeveon Clowney, DE – Houston Texans
13. 2018: Hayden Hurst, TE – Baltimore Ravens
14. 2020: Javon Kinlaw, DT – San Francisco 49ers
15. 2021: Jaycee Horn, DB – Carolina Panthers
16. 2024: Xavier Legette, WR – Carolina Panthers

== Future opponents ==
=== Conference opponents ===
From 1992 to 2023, South Carolina played in the East Division of the SEC and played each opponent in the division each year along with several teams from the West Division. The SEC expanded the conference to 16 teams and eliminated its two divisions in 2024, causing a new scheduling format for the Gamecocks to play against the other members of the conference. Only the 2024 conference schedule was announced on June 14, 2023, while the conference still considers a new format for the future.

==== 2024 conference schedule ====
Opponent	Site	Result
at Alabama	Bryant–Denny Stadium; Tuscaloosa, AL	L 25–27
at Kentucky	Kroger Field; Lexington, KY	W 31–6
LSU	Williams–Brice Stadium; Columbia, SC	L 33–36
Missouri	Williams–Brice Stadium; Columbia, SC (Mayor's Cup)	W 34–30
at Oklahoma	Gaylord Family Oklahoma Memorial Stadium; Norman, OK	W 35–9
Ole Miss	Williams–Brice Stadium; Columbia, SC	L 3–27
Texas A&M	Williams–Brice Stadium; Columbia, SC	W 44–20
at Vanderbilt	FirstBank Stadium; Nashville, TN	W 28–7

=== Non-conference opponents ===
Announced schedules as of May 22, 2026.

2026	2027	2028	2029	2030	2031	2032	2033	2034	2035	2036	2037
Kent State	Furman	Bowling Green		East Carolina			at Appalachian State	Appalachian State			
Towson	Appalachian State	Wofford	Appalachian State								
at Clemson	Clemson	at Clemson	Clemson	at Clemson	Clemson	at Clemson	Clemson	at Clemson	Clemson	at Clemson	Clemson
