= Darius Rush =

American football player (born 2000)

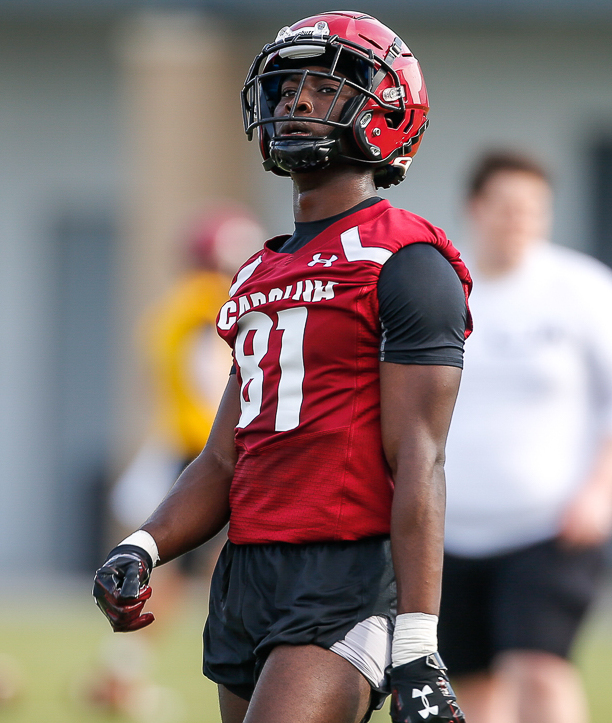
- Rush with the South Carolina Gamecocks in 2019

No. 38 – Pittsburgh Steelers
- Position: Cornerback
- Roster status: Practice squad

Personal information
- Born: February 22, 2000 (age 26); Kingstree, South Carolina, U.S.
- Listed height: 6 ft 2 in (1.88 m)
- Listed weight: 198 lb (90 kg)

Career information
- High school: C. E. Murray (Greeleyville, South Carolina)
- College: South Carolina (2018–2022)
- NFL draft: 2023: 5th round, 138th overall pick

Career history
- Indianapolis Colts (2023)*; Kansas City Chiefs (2023); Pittsburgh Steelers (2023–2024); Kansas City Chiefs (2024)*; Cleveland Browns (2025)*; Washington Commanders (2025–2026); Pittsburgh Steelers (2026–present)*
- * Offseason or practice squad member only

Career NFL statistics as of 2025
- Tackles: 3
- Pass deflections: 1
- Stats at Pro Football Reference

Darius Jaloyd Rush (born February 22, 2000) is an American professional football cornerback for the Pittsburgh Steelers of the National Football League (NFL). He played college football for the South Carolina Gamecocks.

== Early life ==
Rush was born on February 22, 2000, in Kingstree, South Carolina. He attended C. E. Murray High School, where he played wide receiver and defensive back on their football team. As a senior, he caught 47 passes for 863 yards and 17 touchdowns and rushed for 125 yards and one touchdown. Rush committed to play college football at South Carolina over offers from Charlotte and Miami-Ohio.

== College career ==
Rush redshirted his true freshman season at South Carolina. He played mostly special teams during his redshirt freshman season while he also moved from wide receiver to cornerback. Rush became a starter entering his junior season and finished the year with 25 tackles, eight passes broken up, and one interception. He had 38 tackles with seven passes broken up, two interceptions and one forced fumble as a redshirt senior. Rush graduated with a degree in sport and entertainment management and declared for the 2023 NFL draft following the 2022 season.

== Professional career ==
Pre-draft measurables
Height	Weight	Arm length	Hand span	Wingspan	40-yard dash	10-yard split	20-yard split	Vertical jump	Broad jump
6 ft 1 7/8 in (1.88 m)	198 lb (90 kg)	33 3/8 in (0.85 m)	9 1/2 in (0.24 m)	6 ft 7 5/8 in (2.02 m)	4.36 s	1.51 s	2.52 s	35.0 in (0.89 m)	10 ft 1 in (3.07 m)
All values from the NFL Combine

=== Indianapolis Colts ===
Rush was selected by the Indianapolis Colts in the fifth round, 138th overall, in the 2023 NFL Draft. He was waived by the Colts on August 29, 2023.

=== Kansas City Chiefs ===
On August 30, 2023, Rush was claimed off waivers by the Kansas City Chiefs. He was waived on September 16, and re-signed to the practice squad.

=== Pittsburgh Steelers ===
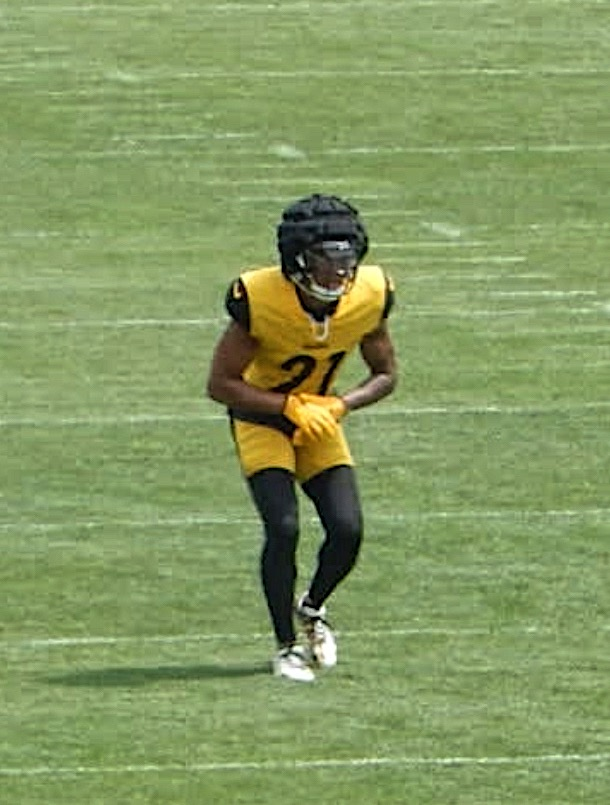
Rush with the Pittsburgh Steelers in 2023

On October 18, 2023, the Pittsburgh Steelers signed Rush off of the Chiefs' practice squad. Rush was waived by Pittsburgh on October 1, 2024.

=== Kansas City Chiefs (second stint) ===
On October 4, 2024, Rush signed with the Kansas City Chiefs' practice squad. He signed a reserve/future contract with the team on February 11, 2025. On August 1, Rush was waived by the Chiefs with an injury designation.

=== Cleveland Browns ===
On August 11, 2025, Rush signed with the Cleveland Browns. He was waived by Cleveland on August 24.

=== Washington Commanders ===
On August 28, 2025, Rush signed with the Washington Commanders' practice squad. Rush was elevated from the practice squad to the active roster for the Commanders Week 15 game against the New York Giants. On January 5, 2026, he signed a reserve/futures contract with the Commanders. Rush was released by Washington as a part of final roster cuts on August 30; he was re-signed to their practice squad the following day. He was released by the Commanders on September 15.

=== Pittsburgh Steelers (second stint) ===
On September 22, 2026, Rush signed with the Pittsburgh Steelers' practice squad.
