= Kyle Kennard =

American football player (born 2001)

No. 53 – Washington Commanders
- Position: Outside linebacker
- Roster status: Practice squad

Personal information
- Born: December 12, 2001 (age 24); Flint, Michigan, U.S.
- Listed height: 6 ft 4 in (1.93 m)
- Listed weight: 254 lb (115 kg)

Career information
- High school: Riverwood (Sandy Springs, Georgia)
- College: Georgia Tech (2020–2023); South Carolina (2024)
- NFL draft: 2025: 4th round, 125th overall pick

Career history
- Los Angeles Chargers (2025); Washington Commanders (2026–present)*
- * Offseason or practice squad member only

Awards and highlights
- Bronko Nagurski Trophy (2024); Consensus All-American (2024); SEC Defensive Player of the Year (2024); First-team All-SEC (2024)

Career NFL statistics as of 2025
- Total tackles: 2
- Stats at Pro Football Reference

Kyle M. Kennard (born December 12, 2001) is an American professional football outside linebacker for the Washington Commanders of the National Football League (NFL). Kennard played college football for the Georgia Tech Yellow Jackets and South Carolina Gamecocks. Kennard was selected by the Los Angeles Chargers in the fourth round of the 2025 NFL draft.

== Early life ==
Kennard was born on December 12, 2001 in Flint, Michigan. Kennard's family moved to Georgia when he was 9 and he attended Riverwood International Charter School in Sandy Springs, Georgia. Coming out of high school, he was rated as a three-star recruit and committed to play college football for the Georgia Tech Yellow Jackets.

== College career ==
=== Georgia Tech ===
In his first two seasons in 2020 and 2021, Kennard recorded 25 tackles with six being for a loss and four and a half sacks. During the 2022 season, Kennard played in twelve games for the Yellow Jackets while making nine starts, where he totaled 36 tackles with four and a half being for a loss, and two sacks. In week two of the 2023 season, Kennard was named the Atlantic Coast Conference (ACC) defensive lineman of the week after notching five tackles with half of one being for a loss, a forced fumble, a fumble recovery, and an interception, in a win over the South Carolina State Bulldogs. In week four, he would once again be named the ACC defensive lineman of the week after recording four sacks and a forced fumble versus Wake Forest. Kennard finished the 2023 season tallying 54 tackles with 11 being for a loss, six sacks, two forced fumbles, two fumble recoveries, and an interception. After the conclusion of the 2023 season, Kennard entered the NCAA transfer portal.

=== South Carolina ===
Kennard transferred to play for the South Carolina Gamecocks. In his first game as a Gamecock in week one of the 2024 season, he notched five tackles, two and a half sacks, and two forced fumbles, as he helped South Carolina to a win over Old Dominion. He also holds the #2 spot for program single season sacks with 11.5, trailing only Jadeveon Clowney who recorded 13 in 2012. Kennard was named the Bronko Nagurski Trophy winner as the top defensive player in college football.

=== College statistics ===
Year	Team	GP	Tackles				Fumbles				Interceptions			
Year	Team	GP	Cmb	Solo	Ast	Sck	FF	FR	Yds	TD	Int	Yds	TD	PD
2020	Georgia Tech	6	10	8	2	2.5	0	0	0	0	0	0	0	0
2021	Georgia Tech	12	15	5	10	2.0	0	0	0	0	0	0	0	0
2022	Georgia Tech	12	36	19	17	2.0	0	0	0	0	0	0	0	0
2023	Georgia Tech	12	54	32	22	6.0	2	2	0	0	1	12	0	0
2024	South Carolina	12	28	20	8	11.5	3	2	0	0	0	0	0	1
Career		54	143	84	59	24.0	5	4	0	0	1	12	0	1

== Professional career ==
Pre-draft measurables
Height	Weight	Arm length	Hand span	Wingspan	40-yard dash	10-yard split	20-yard split	Bench press
6 ft 4 in (1.93 m)	254 lb (115 kg)	34 in (0.86 m)	9 3/4 in (0.25 m)	6 ft 9 1/2 in (2.07 m)	4.73 s	1.63 s	2.74 s	23 reps
All values from NFL Combine

=== Los Angeles Chargers ===
Kennard was selected with the 125th pick by the Los Angeles Chargers, in the fourth round of the 2025 NFL draft.

On August 30, 2026, Kennard was waived/injured by the Chargers. On September 5, Kennard was released.

=== Washington Commanders ===
On October 28, 2026, Kennard signed with the Washington Commanders' practice squad.
