= Ernest Dye =

American football player (born 1971)

No. 65
- Positions: Tackle, guard

Personal information
- Born: July 15, 1971 (age 55); Greenwood, South Carolina, U.S.
- Listed height: 6 ft 6 in (1.98 m)
- Listed weight: 330 lb (150 kg)

Career information
- High school: Greenwood
- College: South Carolina
- NFL draft: 1993: 1st round, 18th overall pick

Career history
- Phoenix/Arizona Cardinals (1993–1996); St. Louis Rams (1997); Arizona Cardinals (1999)

Awards and highlights
- First-team All-SEC (1992)

Career NFL statistics
- Games played: 50
- Games started: 23
- Fumble recoveries: 1
- Stats at Pro Football Reference

Ernest Dye (born July 15, 1971) is an American former professional football player who was an offensive guard in the National Football League (NFL). He was selected by the Phoenix Cardinals in the first round of the 1993 NFL draft.

In August 1999, Dye along with teammates Carl Simpson and Lester Holmes, was involved in a severe car crash that cost Dye the use of his right arm, ending his career.
