= Steve Wadiak =

American football running back

No. 37
- Position: Running back

Personal information
- Born: January 8, 1926; Chicago, Illinois, U.S.
- Died: March 9, 1952 (aged 26); Augusta, Georgia, U.S.
- Listed height: 5 ft 9 in (1.75 m)
- Listed weight: 185 lb (84 kg)

Career information
- High school: Fenger Academy (1939–1940); Chicago Vocational (1941–1943)
- College: South Carolina (1948–1951)

Awards and highlights
- Southern Conference Player of the Year (1950); South Carolina Athletics Hall of Fame (1967); South Carolina Gamecocks No. 37 retired

Stephan Wadiak (January 8, 1926 – March 9, 1952), nicknamed "The Cadillac", was an American football running back. He was a star college football player for the South Carolina Gamecocks, being named the Southern Conference Player of the Year in 1950. He was selected in the third round (30th overall) of the 1952 NFL draft by the Pittsburgh Steelers, but was killed in a car crash before his first season. Wadiak's number is retired by the school, having been the first to receive the honor.
