= 2019 South Carolina Gamecocks football team =

American college football season

2019 South Carolina Gamecocks football
- Conference: Southeastern Conference
- East
- Record: 4–8 (3–5 SEC)
- Head coach: Will Muschamp (4th season)
- Offensive coordinator: Bryan McClendon (4th season)
- Offensive scheme: Hurry-up, no-huddle spread
- Defensive coordinator: Travaris Robinson (4th season)
- Base defense: Multiple 4–3
- Home stadium: Williams–Brice Stadium

Uniform
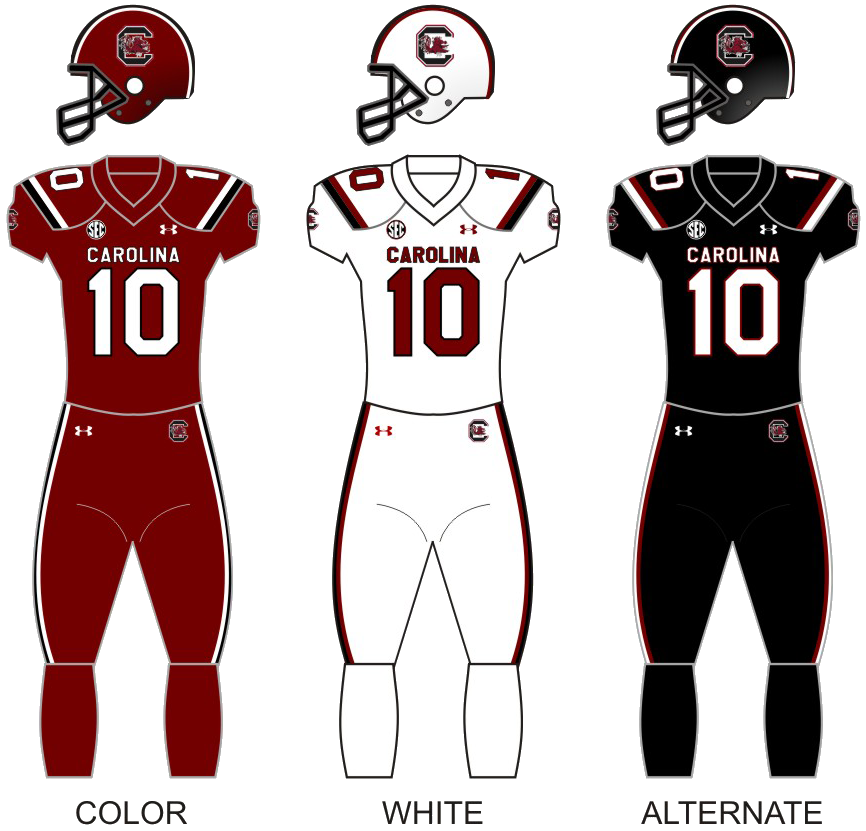

2019 Southeastern Conference football standings
	Conf.			Overall
Team	W		L	W		L
Eastern Division
No. 4 Georgia x	7	–	1	12	–	2
No. 6 Florida	6	–	2	11	–	2
Tennessee *	5	–	3	8	–	5
Kentucky	3	–	5	8	–	5
Missouri *	3	–	5	6	–	6
South Carolina	3	–	5	4	–	8
Vanderbilt	1	–	7	3	–	9
Western Division
No. 1 LSU x$#^	8	–	0	15	–	0
No. 8 Alabama	6	–	2	11	–	2
No. 14 Auburn	5	–	3	9	–	4
Texas A&M	4	–	4	8	–	5
Mississippi State	3	–	5	6	–	7
Ole Miss	2	–	6	4	–	8
Arkansas	0	–	8	2	–	10
Championship: LSU 37, Georgia 10
# – College Football Playoff champion; ^ – College Football Playoff participant; $ – Conference champion; x – Division champion/co-champions; * – Tennessee vacated all wins due to NCAA violations. Missouri was ineligible for postseason due to NCAA sanctions.; Rankings from AP Poll

The 2019 South Carolina Gamecocks football team (variously South Carolina, USC, SC, or The Gamecocks) represented the University of South Carolina in the 2019 NCAA Division I FBS football season. This season marked the Gamecocks 126th overall season, 28th as a member of the SEC East Division. The Gamecocks played their home games at Williams–Brice Stadium in Columbia, South Carolina, and were led by fourth-year head coach Will Muschamp.

In 2019, South Carolina finished with a final record of 4–8. The highlight of the season was the upset over No. 3 Georgia, on the road in double overtime, with the Gamecocks being 24.5-point underdogs. It was South Carolina's first win over a ranked opponent since 2016.

== Preseason ==
=== 2019 recruiting class ===
South Carolina jumped out to a fast start for recruiting the 2019 class with early commitments from 4 star Defensive Lineman Rodricus Fitten, and 3 star Offensive tackle Jaylen Nichols. In January 2018 the Gamecocks received commitments from 4 star OT Mark Fox out of Miami, and 3 star JUCO DE Devontae Davis from Georgia Military College. USC also picked up 3 star center, Vincent Murphy from St. Thomas Aquinas High School in Florida.

On April 4, 2018, 4 star QB Ryan Hilinski out of Orange Lutheran High School in Orange, California committed to South Carolina. Ryan is the brother of the former Washington State QB Tyler Hilinski. Also in April, 4 star TE Traevon Kenion committed to the Gamecocks.

On May 25, 5 star defensive end Zacch Pickens committed to South Carolina.

College recruiting (2019)
Name	Hometown	School	Height	Weight	Commit date
Zacch Pickens; DE	Anderson, SC	T. L. Hanna	6 ft 5 in (1.96 m)	268 lb (122 kg)	May 25, 2018
Zacch Pickens; DE	Recruit ratings: Scout: Rivals: 247Sports: ESPN: (86)				
Ryan Hilinski; QB	Orange, CA	Orange Lutheran	6 ft 4 in (1.93 m)	222 lb (101 kg)	Apr 4, 2018
Ryan Hilinski; QB	Recruit ratings: Scout: Rivals: 247Sports: ESPN: (87)				
Jaquaze Sorrells; DT	Winter Park, FL	Winter Park	6 ft 3 in (1.91 m)	310 lb (140 kg)	Feb 6, 2019
Jaquaze Sorrells; DT	Recruit ratings: Scout: Rivals: 247Sports: ESPN: (86)				
Joseph Anderson; DE	Murfreesboro, TN	Siegal	6 ft 4 in (1.93 m)	260 lb (120 kg)	Jun 1, 2018
Joseph Anderson; DE	Recruit ratings: Scout: Rivals: 247Sports: ESPN: (81)				
Traevon Kenion; TE	Monroe, NC	Monroe	6 ft 4 in (1.93 m)	220 lb (100 kg)	Apr 29, 2018
Traevon Kenion; TE	Recruit ratings: Scout: Rivals: 247Sports: ESPN: (80)				
Cam Smith; CB	Blythewood, SC	Westwood	6 ft 1 in (1.85 m)	170 lb (77 kg)	Aug 17, 2018
Cam Smith; CB	Recruit ratings: Scout: Rivals: 247Sports: ESPN: (80)				
Keveon Mullins; WR	Memphis, TN	Whitehaven	6 ft 2 in (1.88 m)	207 lb (94 kg)	Jun 28, 2018
Keveon Mullins; WR	Recruit ratings: Scout: Rivals: 247Sports: ESPN: (79)				
Rodricus Fitten; DE	Atlanta, GA	Washington	6 ft 3 in (1.91 m)	335 lb (152 kg)	Sep 13, 2017
Rodricus Fitten; DE	Recruit ratings: Scout: Rivals: 247Sports: ESPN: (80)				
Shilo Sanders; CB	Cedar Hill, TX	Trinity Christian School	6 ft 0 in (1.83 m)	185 lb (84 kg)	Jan 22, 2019
Shilo Sanders; CB	Recruit ratings: Scout: Rivals: 247Sports: ESPN: (80)				
Jammie Robinson; CB	Leesburg, GA	Lee County High School	5 ft 11 in (1.80 m)	185 lb (84 kg)	Feb 6, 2019
Jammie Robinson; CB	Recruit ratings: Scout: Rivals: 247Sports: ESPN: (80)				
Mark Fox; OT	Miami, FL	Northwestern	6 ft 4 in (1.93 m)	290 lb (130 kg)	Jan 24, 2018
Mark Fox; OT	Recruit ratings: Scout: Rivals: 247Sports: ESPN: (78)				
Derek Boykins; LB	Concord, NC	Central Cabarrus	6 ft 1 in (1.85 m)	224 lb (102 kg)	Jun 2, 2018
Derek Boykins; LB	Recruit ratings: Scout: Rivals: 247Sports: ESPN: (79)				
Jahmar Brown; LB	Opa Locka, FL	St. Thomas Aquinas	6 ft 1 in (1.85 m)	200 lb (91 kg)	May 24, 2018
Jahmar Brown; LB	Recruit ratings: Scout: Rivals: 247Sports: ESPN: (79)				
Vincent Murphy; C	Fort Lauderdale, FL	St. Thomas Aquinas	6 ft 3 in (1.91 m)	285 lb (129 kg)	Feb 3, 2018
Vincent Murphy; C	Recruit ratings: Scout: Rivals: 247Sports: ESPN: (79)				
Devontae Davis; DE	Milledgeville, GA	Georgia Military College	6 ft 5 in (1.96 m)	250 lb (110 kg)	Jan 24, 2018
Devontae Davis; DE	Recruit ratings: Scout: Rivals: 247Sports: ESPN: (80)				
John Dixon; CB	Griffin, GA	Chamberlin	6 ft 0 in (1.83 m)	170 lb (77 kg)	Dec 19, 2018
John Dixon; CB	Recruit ratings: Scout: Rivals: 247Sports: ESPN: (78)				
Kevin Harris; RB	Hinesville, GA	Bradwell Institute	5 ft 11 in (1.80 m)	229 lb (104 kg)	Jun 5, 2018
Kevin Harris; RB	Recruit ratings: Scout: Rivals: 247Sports: ESPN: (77)				
Jaylen Nichols; OT	Charlotte, NC	Myers Park	6 ft 5 in (1.96 m)	300 lb (140 kg)	Dec 11, 2017
Jaylen Nichols; OT	Recruit ratings: Scout: Rivals: 247Sports: ESPN: (77)				
Keshawn Toney; TE	Williston, SC	Williston Elko	6 ft 3 in (1.91 m)	240 lb (110 kg)	Mar 4, 2018
Keshawn Toney; TE	Recruit ratings: Scout: Rivals: 247Sports: ESPN: (79)				
Overall recruit ranking: Scout: 17 Rivals: 17 247Sports: 19 ESPN: 17
Note: In many cases, Scout, Rivals, 247Sports, On3, and ESPN may conflict in their listings of height and weight.; In these cases, the average was taken. ESPN grades are on a 100-point scale.; Sources: "2019 South Carolina Football Commitment List". Rivals.; "2019 South Carolina Commits". Scout.; "2019 commits". ESPN.; "Scout.com Team Recruiting Rankings". Scout.; "2019 Team Ranking". Rivals.com.; "2019 South Carolina Gamecocks football team". 247Sports.

=== SEC media poll ===
The 2019 SEC Media Days were held July 15–18 in Birmingham, Alabama. In the preseason media poll, South Carolina was projected to finish in fourth in the East Division.

=== Preseason All-SEC teams ===
The Gamecocks had two players selected to the preseason all-SEC teams.

Offense

3rd team

Bryan Edwards – WR

Defense

2nd team

Javon Kinlaw – DL

== Schedule ==
South Carolina announced its 2019 football schedule on September 18, 2018. The 2019 schedule consists of 7 home and 4 away games along with one neutral site game in the regular season. The Gamecocks hosted SEC foes; Alabama, Kentucky, Florida, and Vanderbilt. They traveled to face; Missouri, Georgia, Tennessee, and Texas A&M. South Carolina's nonconference schedule features teams from the ACC, Big South, and Sun Belt. They faced North Carolina in neutral site game in Charlotte, NC, and hosted Charleston Southern (Big South), Appalachian State (Sun Belt), and Clemson (ACC).

According to ESPN and other outlets, South Carolina had the toughest schedule in the country.

ESPN analyst Paul Finebaum described the toughness of the Gamecocks schedule. “I don’t think anyone could argue against the following statement that South Carolina has the hardest schedule in the country, it is absolutely brutal. There is just no getting around it. So knowing that you have Alabama, knowing that you have Georgia and Clemson. By almost everyone’s projections, those are the No. 1, 2 and 3 schools in the country."

Date	Time	Opponent	Site	TV	Result	Attendance
August 31	3:30 p.m.	vs. North Carolina*	Bank of America Stadium; Charlotte, NC (Belk Kickoff Game / Battle of the Carolinas)	ESPN	L 20–24	52,183
September 7	12:00 p.m.	Charleston Southern*	Williams–Brice Stadium; Columbia, SC	SECN	W 72–10	70,698
September 14	3:30 p.m.	No. 2 Alabama	Williams–Brice Stadium; Columbia, SC	CBS	L 23–47	81,954
September 21	4:00 p.m.	at Missouri	Faurot Field; Columbia, MO	SECN Alt.	L 14–34	52,012
September 28	7:30 p.m.	Kentucky	Williams–Brice Stadium; Columbia, SC	SECN	W 24–7	80,828
October 12	12:00 p.m.	at No. 3 Georgia	Sanford Stadium; Athens, GA (rivalry / SEC Nation)	ESPN	W 20–17 ^{2OT}	92,746
October 19	12:00 p.m.	No. 9 Florida	Williams–Brice Stadium; Columbia, SC	ESPN	L 27–38	78,883
October 26	4:00 p.m.	at Tennessee	Neyland Stadium; Knoxville, TN (rivalry)	SECN	L 21–41 ‡	87,397
November 2	7:30 p.m.	Vanderbilt^{†}	Williams–Brice Stadium; Columbia, SC	SECN	W 24–7	71,945
November 9	7:00 p.m.	Appalachian State*	Williams–Brice Stadium; Columbia, SC	ESPN2	L 15–20	80,849
November 16	7:30 p.m.	at Texas A&M	Kyle Field; College Station, TX	SECN	L 6–30	104,957
November 30	12:00 p.m.	No. 3 Clemson*	Williams–Brice Stadium; Columbia, SC (Palmetto Bowl)	ESPN	L 3–38	80,580
*Non-conference game; ^{†}Homecoming; Rankings from AP Poll and CFP Rankings after November 5 released prior to game; All times are in Eastern time

‡ As part of their penalty for NCAA violations, Tennessee has retroactively vacated its 2019 victory over South Carolina. However, the penalty to vacate victories does not result in a loss (or forfeiture) of the affected game or award a victory to the opponent, therefore South Carolina still considers the game a loss in their official records.

== Personnel ==
=== Coaching staff ===
Name	Position	Consecutive season
Will Muschamp	Head coach	4th
Bobby Bentley	Tight ends coach	4th
Travaris Robinson	Defensive coordinator and defensive backs coach	4th
Bryan McClendon	Offensive coordinator and wide receivers coach	4th
Thomas Brown	Running backs coach	1st
John Scott Jr.	Defensive line coach	1st
Eric Wolford	Offensive line coach	3rd
Coleman Hutzler	Linebackers coach and special teams coordinator	4th
Mike Peterson	Outside linebackers coach	3rd
Dan Werner	Quarterbacks coach	2nd
Kyle Krantz	Nickelbacks and strong side linebackers coach, assistant special teams coach	2nd
Jeff Dillman	Director of Player Strength and Conditioning	4th
Matthew Lindsey	Director of Player Personnel	3rd
Marcus Lattimore	Director of Player Development	2nd

=== Roster ===
2019 South Carolina Gamecocks Football Roster
Quarterback: 3 Ryan Hilinski – freshman (6'3, 230); 7 Dakereon Joyner – sophomore (6'1, 205); 10 Jay Urich – (redshirt) sophomore (6'5, 210); 11 Corbett Glick – (redshirt) freshman (6'1, 203); 14 Connor Jordan – freshman (6'4, 197); 19 Jake Bentley – senior (6'4, 220); Running back: 4 Tavien Feaster – senior (6'0, 221); 5 Rico Dowdle – senior (6'0, 215); 14 Deshaun Fenwick – (redshirt) freshman (6'1, 230); 20 Kevin Harris – freshman (5'10, 225); 27 Zachariah Doe – freshman (6'0, 202); 32 Caleb Kinlaw – (redshirt) senior (5'10, 202); 33 Slade Carroll – (redshirt) junior (5'9, 205); 34 Mon Denson – (redshirt) senior (5'10, 215); Wide receiver: 6 Josh Vann – sophomore (5'10, 185); 8 Randrecous Davis – (redshirt) junior (5'10, 190); 13 Shi Smith – junior (5'10, 190); 16 Bailey Hart – (redshirt) junior (6'3, 185); 17 Xavier Legette – freshman (6'0, 205); 18 OrTre Smith – (redshirt) sophomore (6'4, 220); 35 Trey Adkins – (redshirt) freshman (5'11, 170); 80 Kevin Mullins – freshman (6'1, 220); 83 Chavis Dawkins – senior (6'2, 225); 85 Tyquan Johnson – freshman (6'3, 180); 86 Chad Terrell – (redshirt) sophomore (6'3, 220); 89 Bryan Edwards – senior (6'3, 215); Placekicker: 40 Eddie Buckhouse – (redshirt) freshman (5'8, 159); 42 Alexander Woznick – (redshirt) junior (5'11, 165); 43 Parker White – (redshirt) junior (6'5, 200); 47 Cole Hanna – (redshirt) junior (6'5, 200); 48 Will Tommie – (redshirt) senior (5'10, 170); Punter: 20 Joseph Charlton – (redshirt) senior (6'5, 190); 36 Christian Kinsley – (redshirt) junior (6'2, 225); 45 Alex Herrera – freshman (5'11, 186); 85 Michael Almond – (redshirt) senior (6'3, 223)	Tight end: 9 Nick Muse – junior (6'3, 234); 12 Traveon Kenion – freshman (6'3, 235); 31 Chandler Farrell – (redshirt) junior (6'3, 295); 41 Caleb Jenerette – (redshirt) sophomore (6'2, 227); 46 Patrick Reedy – (redshirt) freshman (6'7, 250); 82 KeShawn Toney – freshman (6'2, 240); 84 Kyle Markway – (redshirt) senior (6'4, 250); 88 Will Register – (redshirt) sophomore (6'4, 245); Offensive Lineman: 50 Sadarius Hutcherson – (redshirt) junior (6'4, 320); 52 Jaylen Nichols – freshman (6'5, 320); 54 Jovaughn Gwyn – (redshirt) freshman (6'2, 305); 55 Jakai Moore – freshman (6'5, 295); 61 Cameron Johnson – (redshirt) sophomore (6'6, 289); 67 Gavin Bennett – freshman (6'2, 250); 68 Wyatt Campbell – (redshirt) freshman (6'6, 308); 69 John Kanaan – freshman (6'4, 260); 70 Hank Manos – (redshirt) freshman (6'4, 290); 71 Eric Douglas – (redshirt) sophomore (6'4, 315); 72 Donell Stanley – (redshirt) senior (6'3, 322); 73 Summie Carlay – (redshirt) sophomore (6'5, 295); 74 Vincent Murphy – freshman (6'2, 290); 75 Jordon Carty – (redshirt) sophomore (6'7, 310); 76 Jordan Rhodes – (redshirt) sophomore (6'4, 330); 78 M.J. Webb – (redshirt) sophomore (6'3, 290); 79 Dylan Wonnum – sophomore (6'5, 310); Defensive Lineman: 3 Javon Kinlaw – senior (6'6, 310); 5 Keir Thomas – senior (6'2, 275); 8 D. J. Wonnum – senior (6'5, 260); 15 Aaron Sterling – junior (6'1, 250); 16 Rodricus Fitten – freshman (6'1, 245); 19 Brad Johnson – junior (6'2, 250); 26 Zacch Pickens – freshman (6'3, 300); 35 Daniel Fennell – (redshirt) senior (6'2, 255); 50 Griffin Gentry – (redshirt) junior (6'1, 275); 51 Donovan Witt – (redshirt) junior (6'2, 242); 52 Kingsley Enagbare – sophomore (6'4, 260); 57 Jazuun Outlaw – (redshirt) sophomore (6'2, 235); 59 Alex DeLoach – (redshirt) sophomore (6'3, 212); 90 Rick Sandidge – sophomore (6'5, 300); 91 Jaquaze Sorrells – freshman (6'2, 314); 92 Tyreek Johnson – (redshirt) freshman (6'3, 270); 93 Joseph Anderson – freshman (6'3, 280); 95 Kobe Smith – senior (6'2, 300); 96 Devontae Davis – junior (6'3, 300); 99 Jabari Ellis – (redshirt) junior (6'3, 280)	Linebacker: 6 T. J. Brunson – senior (6'1, 230); 11 Eldridge Thompson – (redshirt) senior (6'1, 225); 23 Derek Boykins-Brooks – freshman (6'1, 226); 30 Damani Staley – junior (6'0, 235); 40 Jahmar Brown – freshman (6'1, 205); 42 Rosendo Louis Jr. – sophomore (6'2, 250); 44 Sherrod Greene – junior (6'1, 230); 45 Spencer Eason-Riddle – (redshirt) junior (6'0, 230); 46 Noah Vincent – (redshirt) freshman (6'1, 215); 48 Sean McGonigal – (redshirt) sophomore (6'1, 225); 53 Ernest Jones – sophomore (6'2, 235); Defensive back: 1 Jaycee Horn – sophomore (6'1, 200); 4 Jaylin Dickerson – (redshirt) sophomore (6'1, 195); 7 Jammie Robinson – freshman (5'11, 200); 9 Cam Smith – freshman (6'0, 185); 10 R.J. Roderick – sophomore (6'0, 200); 12 Shilo Sanders – freshman (6'0, 190); 21 Jamyest Williams – junior (5'8, 180); 22 John Dixon – freshman (6'0, 190); 24 Israel Mukuamu – sophomore (6'4, 205); 25 A.J. Turner – (redshirt) senior (5'10, 190); 28 Darius Rush – (redshirt) freshman (6'2, 195); 29 J.T. Ibe – (redshirt) senior (5'10, 195); 31 Jamel Cook – (redshirt) junior (6'4, 200); 39 Dawson Hoffman – (redshirt) freshman (5'11, 200); 41 James Bartholomew – (redshirt) sophomore (5'9, 170); 43 Jaylon Dubose – freshman (6'2, 197); 47 Jordan Villafane – (redshirt) sophomore (5'10, 175); 49 Jaylan Foster – (redshirt) junior (5'10, 184); Long snappers: 59 Matthew Bailey – freshman (6'2, 185)
: 2019 South Carolina Gamecocks Football Roster 08/27/19

=== Depth chart ===
Defense

FS
J.T. Ibe
Jammie Robinson

WLB	MLB	SLB
T. J. Brunson	Ernest Jones	Sherrod Greene
⋅	Rosendo Louis Jr.	Jahmar Brown

SS
Jamyest Williams
R.J. Roderick

CB
Jaycee Horn
John Dixon

DE	DT	DT	DE
D. J. Wonnum	Javon Kinlaw	Kobe Smith	Aaron Sterling
Daniel Fennell	Zacch Pickens	Keir Thomas	Kingsley Enagbare

CB
Israel Mukuamu
A.J. Turner

Offense

WR
Bryan Edwards
Chavis Dawkins

WR
Josh Vann
OrTre Smith

LT	LG	C	RG	RT
Sadarius Hutcherson	Donnell Stanley	Hank Manos	Jovaughn Gwyn	Dylan Wonnum
Jakai Moore	Jordan Rhodes	Vincent Murphy	Eric Douglas	Eric Douglas

TE
Kyle Markway
KeyShawn Toney

WR
Shi Smith
Randrecous Davis

QB
Ryan Hilinski
Dakereon Joyner

RB
Rico Dowdle
Tavien Feaster

Special teams
PK Parker White
PK Will Tommie
P Joseph Charlton
P Michael Almond
KR A.J. Turner
PR Bryan Edwards
LS Matt Oliveira
H Joseph Charlton

== Game summaries ==
=== Vs. North Carolina ===
South Carolina Gamecocks vs North Carolina Tar Heels – Game summary

Quarter	1	2	3	4	Total
South Carolina	10	3	7	0	20
North Carolina	3	3	3	15	24

at Bank of America Stadium • Charlotte, North Carolina

- Date: August 31, 2019
- Game time: 3:30 p.m.
- Game weather: Temperature: • Wind: • Weather:
- Game attendance: 52,183
- Referee: James Carter
- TV announcers (ESPN): Bob Wischusen (play-by-play), Dan Orlovsky (color), Allison Williams (sideline)

Game information

First Quarter

Second Quarter

Third Quarter

Fourth Quarter

Total Yards

- USC – 270
- UNC – 483

Passing leader

- USC – Jake Bentley – 16/30, 142 yards, TD, 2 INT
- UNC – Sam Howell – 15/24, 245 yards, 2 TD

Rushing leader

- USC – Tavien Feaster – 13 carries, 72 yards, TD
- UNC – Javonte Williams – 18 carries, 102 yards

Receiving leader

- USC – Shi Smith – 5 receptions, 55 yards
- UNC – Dazz Newsome – 4 receptions, 74 yards

Defensive leader

- USC – Ernest Jones – 12 tackles
- UNC – Chazz Surratt – 12 tackles, 1 sack

=== Charleston Southern ===
Charleston Southern Buccaneers at South Carolina Gamecocks – Game summary

Quarter	1	2	3	4	Total
Charleston Southern	3	0	0	7	10
South Carolina	21	23	7	21	72

at Williams–Brice Stadium • Columbia, South Carolina

- Date: September 7, 2019
- Game time: 12:00 p.m.
- Game weather: Temperature: • Wind:• Weather:
- TV: SECN

Game information

First Quarter

Second Quarter

Third Quarter

Fourth Quarter

Total Yards

- CSU –
- USC –

Passing leader

- CSU –
- USC –

Rushing leader

- CSU –
- USC –

Receiving leader

- CSU –
- USC –

Defensive leader

- CSU –
- USC –

=== Alabama ===
Alabama Crimson Tide at South Carolina Gamecocks – Game summary

Quarter	1	2	3	4	Total
No. 2 Alabama	14	10	10	13	47
South Carolina	10	0	3	10	23

at Williams-Brice Stadium • Columbia, SC

- Date: September 14, 2019
- Game time: 3:30 p.m.
- Game weather: Temperature: • Wind: • Weather:
- TV announcers (CBS): Brad Nessler (play-by-play), Gary Danielson (color), Jamie Erdahl (sideline)

Game information

First Quarter

Second Quarter

Third Quarter

Fourth Quarter

Total Yards

- ALA –
- USC –

Passing leader

- ALA –
- USC –

Rushing leader

- ALA –
- USC –

Receiving leader

- ALA –
- USC –

Defensive leader

- ALA –
- USC –

=== At Missouri ===
South Carolina Gamecocks at Missouri Tigers – Game summary

Quarter	1	2	3	4	Total
South Carolina	0	7	7	0	14
Missouri	7	10	14	3	34

at Faurot Field • Columbia, MO

- Date: September 21, 2019
- Game time: 4:00 p.m. EST
- Game weather: Temperature: • Wind: • Weather:

Game information

First Quarter

Second Quarter

Third Quarter

Total Yards

- SC –
- MU –

Passing leader

- SC –
- MU –

Rushing leader

- SC –
- MU –

Receiving leader

- SC –
- MU –

Defensive leader

- SC –
- MU –

=== Kentucky ===
Kentucky Wildcats at South Carolina Gamecocks – Game summary

Quarter	1	2	3	4	Total
Kentucky	0	0	0	7	7
South Carolina	7	3	7	7	24

at Williams–Brice Stadium • Columbia, South Carolina

- Date: September 28, 2019
- Game time: TBD
- Game weather: Temperature: • Wind: • Weather:

Game information

First Quarter

Second Quarter

Third Quarter

Fourth Quarter

Total Yards

- UK –
- SC –

Passing leader

- UK –
- SC –

Rushing leader

- UK –
- SC –

Receiving leader

- UK –
- SC –

Defensive leader

- UK –
- SC –

=== At Georgia ===
South Carolina Gamecocks at Georgia Bulldogs – Game summary

Quarter	1	2	3	4	OT	2OT	Total
South Carolina	7	10	0	0	0	3	20
No. 3 Georgia	3	7	0	7	0	0	17

at Sanford Stadium • Athens, Georgia

- Date: October 12, 2019
- Game time: 12:00 p.m.
- Game weather: Temperature: 80 °F (27 °C) • Wind: SW 7 mph • Weather: Sunny
- Game attendance: 92,746
- Referee: Ken Williamson
- TV announcers (ESPN): Bob Wischusen and Dan Orlovsky

Game information

First Quarter

- (10:15) UGA – Rodrigo Blankenship 50-yard field goal (Drive: 9 plays, 42 yards, 4:45; Georgia 3–0)
- (1:58) USC – Bryan Edwards 46-yard pass from Ryan Hilinski, Parker White kick (Drive: 9 plays, 93 yards, 3:59; South Carolina 7–3)

Second Quarter

- (13:35) UGA – D'Andre Swift 1-yard run, Rodrigo Blankenship kick (Drive: 9 plays, 75 yards, 3:23; Georgia 10–7)
- (3:00) USC – Parker White 49-yard field goal (Drive: 7 plays, 30 yards, 2:31; Tied 10–10)
- (1:00) USC – Israel Mukuamu 53-yard interception, Parker White kick (South Carolina 17–10)

Third Quarter

No scoring plays

Fourth Quarter

- (1:48) UGA – Demetris Robertson 6-yard pass from Jake Fromm, Rodrigo Blankenship kick (Drive: 13 plays, 96 yards, 4:38; Tied 17–17)

First overtime

No scoring plays

Second overtime

- (0:00) USC – Parker White 24-yard field goal (Drive: 8 plays, 19 yards, 0:00; South Carolina 20–17)

Total Yards

- USC – 297 yards
- UGA – 468 yards

Passing leader

- USC – Ryan Hilinski – 15/20, 116 yards, TD
- UGA – Jake Fromm – 28/51, 295 yards, TD, 3 INT

Rushing leader

- USC – Rico Dowdle – 21 rushes, 79 yards
- UGA – D'Andre Swift – 23 rushes, 113 yards, TD

Receiving leader

- USC – Bryan Edwards – 6 receptions, 78 yards, TD
- UGA – George Pickens – 7 receptions, 98 yards

Defensive leader

- USC – Ernest Jones – 12 tackles
- UGA – Tae Crowder – 12 tackles

=== Florida ===
Florida Gators at South Carolina Gamecocks – Game summary

Quarter	1	2	3	4	Total
No. 9 Florida	3	7	7	21	38
South Carolina	7	3	10	7	27

at Williams–Brice Stadium • Columbia, South Carolina

- Date: October 19, 2019
- Game time: TBD
- Game weather: Temperature: • Wind: • Weather:

Game information

First Quarter

Second Quarter

Third Quarter

Fourth Quarter

Total Yards

- UF –
- SC –

Passing leader

- UF –
- SC –

Rushing leader

- UF –
- SC –

Receiving leader

- UF –
- SC –

Defensive leader

- UF –
- SC –

=== At Tennessee ===
South Carolina Gamecocks at Tennessee Volunteers – Game summary

Quarter	1	2	3	4	Total
South Carolina	7	14	0	0	21
Tennessee	3	14	14	10	41

at Neyland Stadium • Knoxville, Tennessee

- Date: October 26, 2019
- Game time: TBD
- Game weather: Temperature: • Wind: • Weather

Game information

First Quarter

Second Quarter

Third Quarter

Fourth Quarter

Total Yards

- SC –
- UT –

Passing leader

- SC –
- UT –

Rushing leader

- SC –
- UT –

Receiving leader

- SC –
- UT –

Defensive leader

- SC –
- UT –

=== Vanderbilt ===
Vanderbilt Commodores at South Carolina Gamecocks – Game summary

Quarter	1	2	3	4	Total
Vanderbilt	7	0	0	0	7
South Carolina	0	14	0	10	24

at Williams–Brice Stadium • Columbia, South Carolina

- Date: November 2, 2010
- Game time: TBD
- Game weather: Temperature: • Wind: • Weather:

Game information

First Quarter

Second Quarter

Third Quarter

Fourth Quarter

Total Yards

- VU –
- SC –

Passing leader

- VU –
- SC –

Rushing leader

- VU –
- SC –

Receiving leader

- VU –
- SC –

Defensive leader

- VU –
- SC –

=== Appalachian State ===
2019 Appalachian State Mountaineers at South Carolina Gamecocks – Game summary

Quarter	1	2	3	4	Total
Appalachian State	3	10	7	0	20
South Carolina	6	0	3	6	15

at Williams–Brice Stadium • Columbia, South Carolina

- Date: November 9, 2019
- Game time: TBD
- Game weather: Temperature: • Wind: • Weather:

Game information

First Quarter

Second Quarter

Third Quarter

Fourth Quarter

Total Yards

- ASU –
- USC –

Passing leader

- ASU –
- USC –

Rushing leader

- ASU –
- USC –

Receiving leader

- ASU –
- USC –

Defensive leader

- ASU –
- USC –

=== At Texas A&M ===
South Carolina Gamecocks at Texas A&M Aggies – Game summary

Quarter	1	2	3	4	Total
South Carolina	3	0	0	3	6
Texas A&M	3	10	0	17	30

at Kyle Field • College Station, Texas

- Date: November 16, 2019
- Game time: TBD
- Game weather: Temperature: • Wind: • Weather:

Game information

First Quarter

Second Quarter

Third Quarter

Fourth Quarter

Total Yards

- USC –
- A&M –

Passing leader

- USC –
- A&M –

Rushing leader

- USC –
- A&M –

Receiving leader

- USC –
- A&M –

Defensive leader

- USC –
- A&M –

=== Clemson ===
Clemson Tigers at South Carolina Gamecocks – Game summary

Quarter	1	2	3	4	Total
No. 3 Clemson	14	10	7	7	38
South Carolina	0	3	0	0	3

at Williams–Brice Stadium • Columbia, South Carolina

- Date: November 30, 2019
- Game time: 12:00 p.m.
- Game weather: Temperature: • Wind: • Weather:

Game information

First Quarter

Second Quarter

Third Quarter

Fourth Quarter

Total Yards

- CU –
- SC –

Passing leader

- CU –
- SC –

Rushing leader

- CU –
- SC –

Receiving leader

- CU –
- SC –

Defensive leader

- CU –
- SC –

Schedule source:

== Rankings ==
Ranking movements Legend: ██ Increase in ranking ██ Decrease in ranking — = Not ranked RV = Received votes
	Week																
Poll	Pre	1	2	3	4	5	6	7	8	9	10	11	12	13	14	15	Final
AP	RV	—	—	—	—	—	—	RV	—	—	—	—	—	—	—		
Coaches	RV	—	—	—	—	—	—	RV	—	—	—	—	—	—	—		
CFP	Not released										—	—	—	—	—		Not released

== Players drafted into the NFL ==
Round	Pick	Player	Position	NFL club
1	14	Javon Kinlaw	DT	San Francisco 49ers
3	81	Bryan Edwards	WR	Las Vegas Raiders
4	117	D. J. Wonnum	DE	Minnesota Vikings
7	238	T. J. Brunson	ILB	New York Giants
