= Everett Dawkins =

American football player (born 1990)

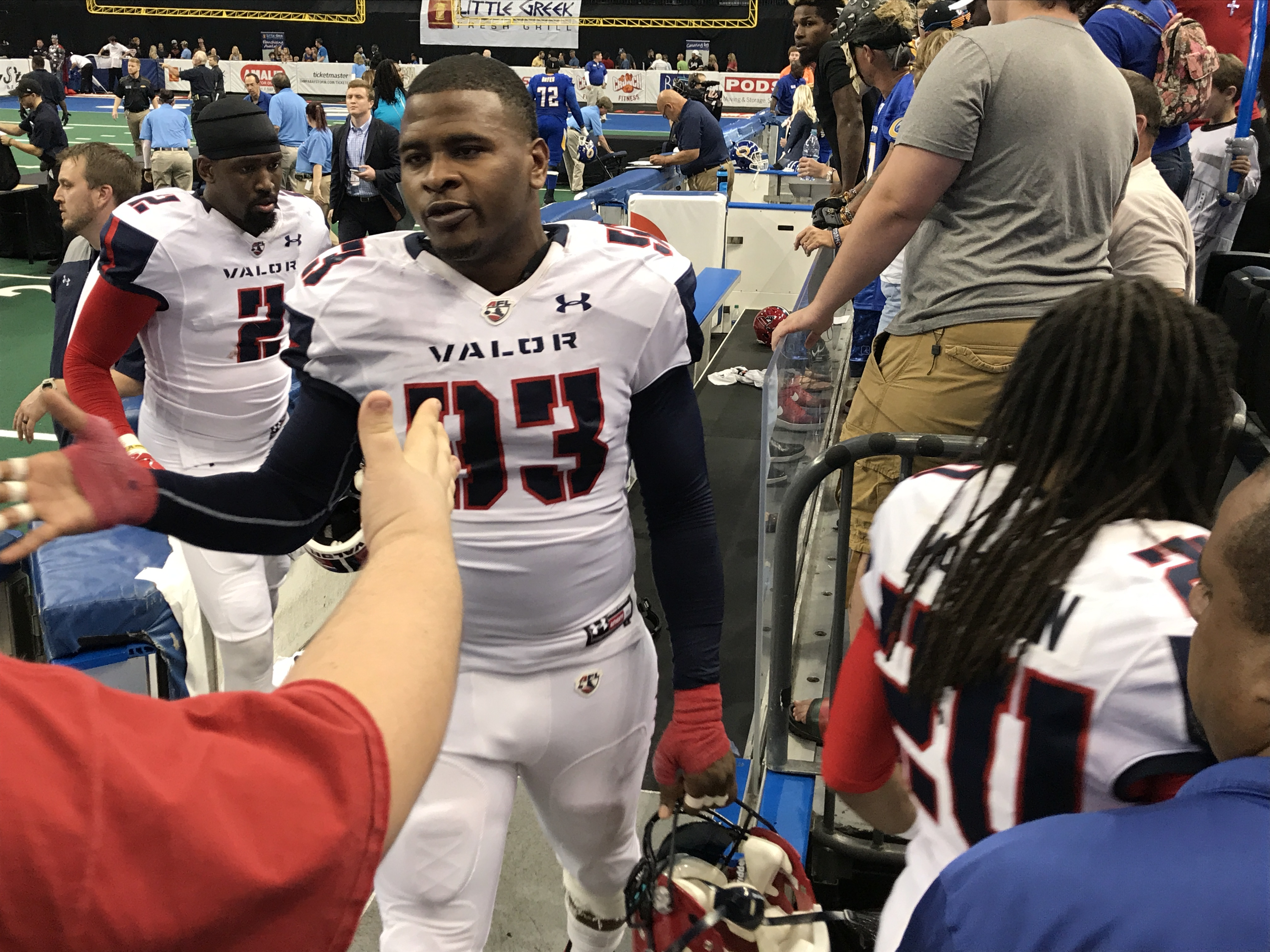
- Dawkins with the Washington Valor in 2017

No. 93, 90
- Position: Defensive tackle

Personal information
- Born: June 13, 1990 (age 36); Spartanburg, South Carolina, U.S.
- Listed height: 6 ft 2 in (1.88 m)
- Listed weight: 300 lb (136 kg)

Career information
- High school: Byrnes (Duncan, South Carolina)
- College: Florida State
- NFL draft: 2013: 7th round, 229th overall pick

Career history
- Minnesota Vikings (2013)*; Dallas Cowboys (2013); Tampa Bay Buccaneers (2013–2014)*; New York Giants (2014)*; Tampa Bay Storm (2015–2016); Brooklyn Bolts (2015); Washington Valor (2017)
- * Offseason or practice squad member only

Awards and highlights
- Second-team All-ACC (2012)

Career AFL statistics
- Total tackles: 41
- Sacks: 5.5
- Forced fumbles: 4
- Fumble recoveries: 3
- Stats at ArenaFan.com
- Stats at Pro Football Reference

Everett Dawkins (born June 13, 1990) is an American former professional football player who was a defensive tackle in the National Football League (NFL). He was selected by the Minnesota Vikings in the seventh round of the 2013 NFL draft. He played college football for the Florida State Seminoles. Dawkins was also a member of the Dallas Cowboys, Tampa Bay Buccaneers, New York Giants, Tampa Bay Storm, Brooklyn Bolts, and Washington Valor.

== Early life ==
A native of Spartanburg, South Carolina, Dawkins attended James F. Byrnes High School in Duncan, where he was an All-State defensive lineman. Driven by an offense that included running back Marcus Lattimore, the Rebels capped a 15–0 season with a state championship in 2007. From his defensive end position, Dawkins contributed 115 tackles, including 14 sacks and five fumble recoveries. After his senior season concluded, he was invited to Max Emfinger's All-American Bowl Classic in Jackson, Mississippi, where he recorded five sacks and double-digit tackles, and to the 71st annual Shrine Bowl game.

Regarded as a four-star recruit by Rivals.com, Dawkins was ranked as the No. 8 weakside defensive end prospects in his class. With offers also from South Carolina, Illinois, Michigan State, Tennessee, and Virginia Tech, Dawkins committed to the Seminoles on November 17, 2007.

== College career ==
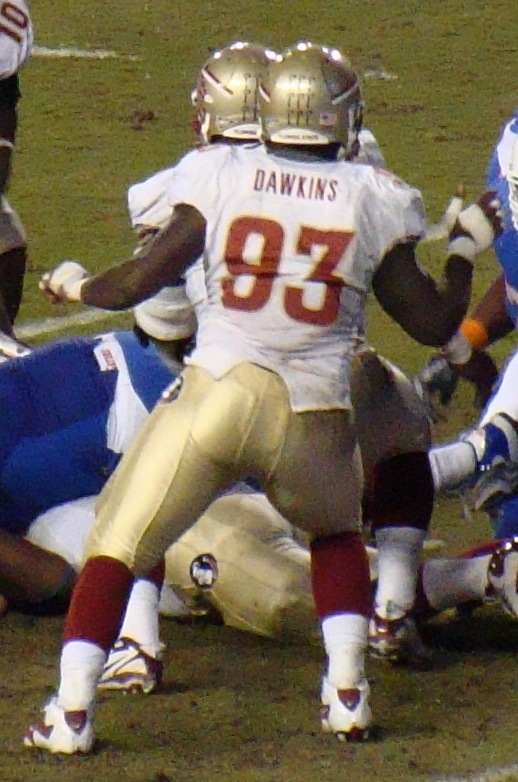
Dawkins with Florida State in 2009

Dawkins was a two-year starter at defensive tackle for Florida State.

== Professional career ==
Pre-draft measurables
Height	Weight	40-yard dash	10-yard split	20-yard split	20-yard shuttle	Three-cone drill	Vertical jump	Broad jump	Bench press
6 ft 2 in (1.88 m)	292 lb (132 kg)	5.01 s	1.75 s	2.85 s	4.88 s	7.61 s	30 in (0.76 m)	8 ft 7 in (2.62 m)	23 reps
All values from NFL Combine

=== Minnesota Vikings ===
Dawkins was released by the Vikings on August 31, 2013 (along with 18 others) to get to a 53-man roster and signed to the practice squad the next day.

=== Dallas Cowboys ===
On November 6, 2013, Dawkins was signed off of Minnesota's practice squad by the Dallas Cowboys. He was released on November 26, 2013.

=== Tampa Bay Buccaneers ===
On June 13, 2014, Dawkins was released by the Buccaneers.

=== New York Giants ===
On August 26, 2014, Dawkins was cut by the Giants.

=== Washington Valor ===
Dawkins was assigned to the Washington Valor on January 9, 2017.
