= Jake Bentley =

American football player (born 1997)

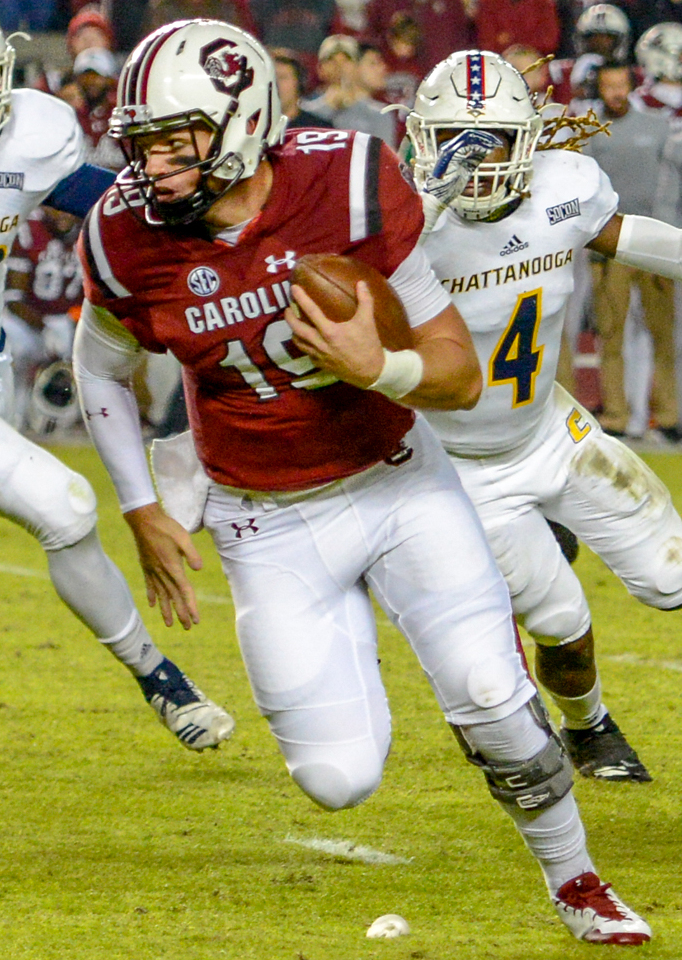
- Bentley with South Carolina in 2018

Current position
- Title: Head coach
- Team: Nation Ford HS (SC)
- Record: 0–0

Biographical details
- Born: November 23, 1997 (age 28); Duncan, South Carolina, U.S.
- Education: Byrnes (Duncan, South Carolina)

Playing career
- 2016–2019: South Carolina
- 2020: Utah
- 2021: South Alabama
- Position: Quarterback

Coaching career (HC unless noted)
- 2022: Florida Atlantic (GA)
- 2023: North Alabama (QB)
- 2024: Rock Hill HS (SC) (QB/co-OC/PGC)
- 2025–present: Nation Ford HS (SC)

Head coaching record
- Overall: 0–0 (high school)

Jacob Lane Bentley (born November 23, 1997) is an American football coach and former player who is currently serving as the head coach at Nation Ford High School in Fort Mill, South Carolina. Bentley played college football for the South Carolina Gamecocks, the Utah Utes, and the South Alabama Jaguars.

== Early years ==
Bentley attended James F. Byrnes High School in Duncan, South Carolina as a freshman, where his father, Bobby Bentley, had been the head coach. He transferred to Opelika High School in Opelika, Alabama, after his father took a coaching role with the Auburn Tigers. As a junior, he passed for 2,834 yards and 28 touchdowns. Bentley reclassified and graduated early after his junior season after his father became a coach for the South Carolina Gamecocks. He committed to the University of South Carolina to play college football.

== College career ==
=== South Carolina ===
==== 2016 season ====
Bentley entered his true freshman year at South Carolina in 2016 as a redshirt behind starters Perry Orth and Brandon Mcllwain. After the Gamecocks started the season with a 2–4 record, Bentley's redshirt was removed. He made his first career start against UMass. The following week he led the Gamecocks to an upset victory over nationally ranked Tennessee and retained the starting quarterback position after that. He finished the season completing 125 of 190 passes for 1,420 yards, nine touchdowns and four interceptions.

==== 2017 ====
In 2017, Bentley started every game at quarterback for the Gamecocks, leading the team to a 9–4 record, including a come-from-behind victory over Michigan in the Outback Bowl on January 1, 2018. Bentley finished the season with 2,794 yards passing, throwing for 18 touchdowns and rushing for 6.

==== 2018 ====
Bentley started the first four games for the Gamecocks in 2018, compiling a 2–2 record with seven touchdowns and six interceptions. On October 6, 2018, Bentley missed his first start since his freshman year after sustaining a knee sprain in the previous week's loss to Kentucky. Senior Michael Scarnecchia started in his place, leading the Gamecocks to a 37–35 win over Missouri. Bentley's roommate Parker White kicked the game-winning field goal with two seconds left.

On November 24, 2018, Bentley set the South Carolina single-game passing record when he threw for 510 yards in a 56–35 loss to undefeated, second-ranked, and eventual National Champion Clemson at Death Valley.

==== 2019 ====
Bentley was named starting quarterback for the 2019 season, but suffered a foot injury in the first game of the season, the 2019 Belk Kickoff Game against North Carolina. As a result, he was benched and freshman quarterback Ryan Hilinski was named the starting quarterback. On September 8, 2019, it was reported that Bentley would have season-ending surgery on his foot. At the end of the 2019 season, Bentley announced he would be transferring schools for his last year of eligibility. On December 9, Bentley announced that he would be transferring to the University of Utah for the 2020 season.

=== Utah ===
==== 2020 ====
Bentley was originally announced as the backup quarterback for the 2020 season, behind Texas transfer Cameron Rising, but after Rising was injured in the season opener against USC, Bentley was named the starter for the remaining games. Bentley completed 62 percent of his passes in his season with the Utes.

Following the season finale against Washington State, in which Bentley threw an interception in the second quarter and was benched in favor of walk-on Drew Lisk, Bentley, for the second time in his collegiate career, entered the NCAA Transfer Portal.

=== South Alabama ===
==== 2021 ====
On January 7, 2021, Bentley announced that he would be playing his final season at the University of South Alabama. He appeared in ten games for the Jaguars, throwing for 2,476 yards, 17 touchdowns, and 8 interceptions.

=== Statistics ===
Year	Team	Games		Passing						
Year	Team	G	GS	Cmp	Att	Pct	Yards	TD	Int	Rtg
2016	South Carolina	7	7	125	190	65.8	1,420	9	4	140.0
2017	South Carolina	13	13	245	394	62.4	2,794	18	12	130.7
2018	South Carolina	12	12	240	388	61.9	3,171	27	14	146.3
2019	South Carolina	1	1	16	30	53.3	142	1	2	90.8
2020	Utah	5	4	77	124	62.1	882	6	6	128.1
2021	South Alabama	10	10	212	303	70.0	2,476	17	8	151.8
Career		48	47	915	1429	64.0	10885	78	46	131.3

== Coaching career ==
=== Florida Atlantic ===
In early 2022, it was announced that Bentley was joining the Florida Atlantic football program as a graduate assistant, working with head coach Willie Taggart.

=== North Alabama ===
On December 8, 2022, he was announced as the quarterbacks coach at North Alabama.

=== Rock Hill High School (SC) ===
On May 3, 2024, Bentley was hired by Rock Hill High School in South Carolina as their quarterbacks coach, co-offensive coordinator and passing game coordinator.

=== Nation Ford High School (SC) ===
On January 8, 2025, Bentley was hired as the head coach at Nation Ford High School in Fort Mill, South Carolina.

==== Head coaching record ====
Year	Team	Overall	Conference	Standing	Bowl/playoffs
Nation Ford Falcons (South Carolina 5A-Region 3) (2025–present)
2025	Nation Ford	4–7	1–5		
Nation Ford:		4–7	1–5		
Total:		4–7			

== Personal life ==
His stepbrother, Chas Dodd, played quarterback at Rutgers and is now a graduate assistant strength and conditioning coach at the University of Miami.
