= Steve Durham (American football) =

American football player (born 1958)

No. 72
- Position: Defensive end

Personal information
- Born: October 11, 1958; Greer, South Carolina, U.S.
- Died: April 30, 2010 (aged 51); Woodruff, South Carolina, U.S.
- Listed height: 6 ft 5 in (1.96 m)
- Listed weight: 256 lb (116 kg)

Career information
- High school: James F. Byrnes (Duncan, South Carolina)
- College: Clemson (1977–1980)
- NFL draft: 1981: 6th round, 140th overall pick

Career history
- Seattle Seahawks (1981)*; Dallas Cowboys (1982)*; Baltimore Colts (1982); San Francisco 49ers (1984)*
- * Offseason or practice squad member only

Awards and highlights
- First-team All-ACC (1979)
- Stats at Pro Football Reference

Steven Allen Durham (October 11, 1958 – April 30, 2010) was an American professional football player who was a defensive end for one season with the Baltimore Colts of the National Football League (NFL). He played college football for the Clemson Tigers and was selected by the Seattle Seahawks in the sixth round of the 1981 NFL draft. He was also an offseason member of the Dallas Cowboys and San Francisco 49ers.

== Early life and college ==
Steven Allen Durham was born on October 11, 1958, in Greer, South Carolina. He attended James F. Byrnes High School in Duncan, South Carolina.

Durham lettered for the Clemson Tigers from 1977 to 1980. He was a backup tight end in 1977 and caught one pass for 12 yards. He moved to defensive tackle in 1978 and posted 24 tackles as a backup. He recorded 96 tackles and ten sacks during the 1979 season, earning first-team All-ACC honors. Durham totaled 73 tackles and five sacks his senior year in 1980.

== Professional career ==
Durham was selected by the Seattle Seahawks in the sixth round, with the 140th overall pick, of the 1981 NFL draft. He signed with the Seahawks but was later released on August 31, 1981.

Durham signed with the Dallas Cowboys on March 20, 1982. He was released on August 23, 1982.

Durham was signed by the Baltimore Colts on August 25, 1982. He played in eight games for the Colts during the 1982 season and was listed as a defensive end. He was released on July 25, 1983.

Durham signed with the San Francisco 49ers on May 18, 1984, but was later released.

== Death ==
Durham died due to kidney failure on April 30, 2010, in Woodruff, South Carolina.
