= Prince Miller =

American football player (born 1988)

No. 38, 31, 14
- Position: Cornerback / Punt returner

Personal information
- Born: January 14, 1988 (age 38); Duncan, South Carolina, U.S.
- Listed height: 5 ft 9 in (1.75 m)
- Listed weight: 207 lb (94 kg)

Career information
- College: Georgia
- NFL draft: 2010: undrafted

Career history
- Baltimore Ravens (2010)*; New England Patriots (2010)*; Baltimore Ravens (2010); Detroit Lions (2010); Indianapolis Colts (2011); Buffalo Bills (2011–2012)*; Jacksonville Jaguars (2012)*; Cleveland Browns (2012); Saskatchewan Roughriders (2013)
- * Offseason or practice squad member only

Career NFL statistics
- Total tackles: 7
- Pass deflections: 1
- Stats at Pro Football Reference

Prince Miller (born January 14, 1988) is an American former professional football player who was a cornerback in the National Football League (NFL) and Canadian Football League (CFL). He played for the Saskatchewan Roughriders of the CFL. He played college football for the Georgia Bulldogs.

== Early life ==
Miller attended James F. Byrnes High School in Duncan, South Carolina, where he played football as a cornerback. He was named team MVP his junior and senior seasons, recording 43 tackles, five interceptions, and three punt returns touchdowns as a junior. As a senior, Miller had four interceptions, three forced fumbles, gained over 2,000 yards total offense, and had 16 total touchdowns and was named an Associated Press South Carolina All-State defensive back. He was named the 2005 South Carolina Mr. Football at the SCADA North-South All-Star game, and played in the 2005 Shrine Bowl of the Carolinas.

Miller was also named Gatorade State Football Player of the Year, the Orlando Sentinel South Carolina Player of the Year, and was named to the Atlanta Journal-Constitutions Super Southern 100. As named to the 2005 FSN South Countdown to Signing Day All-South second-team. He was rated by Rivals.com as the No. 26 best athlete, by ESPN.com as the 11th best cornerback in the nation, and by Scout.com as one of the top 20 cornerback prospects in the country.

== College career ==
After graduating from high school, Miller attended the University of Georgia. As a true freshman in 2006, Miller played in every game and was named the team's Special Teams Newcomer of the Year, blocking a punt against UAB which was returned for a touchdown by teammate C. J. Byrd. In 2007, Miller appeared in 13 games, making eight starts at cornerback, finishing the season with 24 tackles, one interception, and seven pass break-ups. As a junior in 2008, Miller appeared in 13 games and made 10 starts, recording 50 tackles and returning nine punts for 191 yards and one touchdown, returned 92 yards against Alabama. In 2009, his senior season, Miller was named a special teams captain and started all 13 games, making 42 tackles, including five for a loss, and returning 19 punts for 226 yards.

== Professional career ==
=== Baltimore Ravens (first stint) ===
After going undrafted in the 2010 NFL draft, Miller signed with the Baltimore Ravens on May 7, 2010. He was waived one day after final cuts by the Ravens on September 5, 2010.

=== New England Patriots ===
The New England Patriots signed Miller to their practice squad on September 7, 2010.

=== Baltimore Ravens (second stint) ===
The Ravens signed Miller off the Patriots' practice squad on September 15, 2010 to their active roster. He was waived on October 5, 2010, and re-signed to their practice squad two days later, October 7, 2010.

=== Detroit Lions ===
The Lions signed Miller off the Ravens' practice squad on December 8, 2010 to their active roster.

=== Jacksonville Jaguars ===
Miller was signed to the Jaguars practice squad on October 18, 2012. He was released on October 30.

=== Saskatchewan Roughriders ===
In 2013, Miller signed with the Saskatchewan Roughriders
