= Chas Dodd =

American football player and coach (born 1992)

Rutgers Scarlet Knights
- Title: Assistant strength & conditioning coach

Personal information
- Born: March 17, 1992 (age 34); Lyman, South Carolina, U.S.
- Listed height: 6 ft 1 in (1.85 m)
- Listed weight: 200 lb (91 kg)

Career information
- High school: Byrnes (Duncan, South Carolina)
- College: Rutgers (2010–2013)
- NFL draft: 2014: undrafted

Career history

Playing
- Lazio Marines (2015)

Coaching
- Opelika HS (AL) (2015) Strength & conditioning coach; South Carolina (2016–2018) Graduate Assistant; Miami (FL) (2020) Assistant strength & conditioning coach; Rutgers Scarlet Knights (2021–present) Assistant strength & conditioning coach

Brandon Chas Dodd (born March 17, 1992) is an American former football quarterback. He played college football at Rutgers University for the Scarlet Knights. He was the starting quarterback for Rutgers as a true freshman. He played professionally overseas in the Italian Football League.

== Early life ==
Dodd attended Byrnes High School and was the starting quarterback for three years there (2007 to 2009). During his sophomore campaign, his first as a starter, he threw for 3,202 passing yards and 32 touchdowns. He set the school record for most passing yards in a game on October 5, 2007, when he had 462 against Hillcrest. In his junior year, Dodd passed for 2,927 yards and 28 touchdowns. In his senior year, he established a Byrnes HS record with 4,163 passing yards during the season, while completing 252 of 391 passes (64.4%) with 51 touchdowns.

Overall, Dodd threw for 10,640 yards in his high school career, which was the highest total in school history. He had a 42–3 record as a starter and led his team to two state championships.

== College career ==
Dodd committed to Rutgers University in July 2009. As a true freshman in 2010, Dodd did not play much during the first few games of the season. On October 8, however, he made his first career college start against Connecticut, as fellow quarterback Tom Savage was injured. In that game, Dodd threw for 322 yards and two touchdowns, and Rutgers came back in the fourth quarter to defeat the Huskies 27–24. Dodd was named Big East Offensive Player of the Week. During the next game, against Army, Dodd directed another fourth-quarter comeback. He had 251 passing yards and two touchdowns; Rutgers won in overtime. The victory against Army was most notable as the game where Rutgers defensive lineman Eric LeGrand was injured on a kickoff coverage play, resulting in him becoming a quadriplegic.

Dodd saw most of the action at quarterback during the last six games of the season, but Rutgers finished with six consecutive losses. On November 20, he threw for a season-high 335 yards and four touchdowns against Cincinnati in a 69–38 defeat. The four touchdowns set a Rutgers single-game record for a true freshman. For the year, Dodd had 1,637 passing yards, 11 touchdowns, and seven interceptions, and he led the team in all three categories.

Dodd started 8 games at quarterback for Rutgers during the 2011 season, however as the season went on Freshman Gary Nova started taking on a greater role at the position He finished the season with 1574 passing yards, 10 touchdowns, and 7 interceptions

During the 2012 season Dodd performed in a backup role to Nova, playing a total of 3 games and throwing a total of one pass. Despite the lack of playing time he was named to the Big East All-Academic Football Team which recognized players who excel in the classroom as well as on the field.

== Professional career ==
Dodd has continued playing football professionally signing a contract to play for the Lazio Marines of the Italian Football League (IFL). He was one of two Americans permitted to play on the team per IFL regulations. The team failed to reach the IFL playoffs in 2015.

== Personal life ==
Chas's father Bobby Bentley is an analyst for the UCF Knights and was previously an assistant coach for the South Florida Bulls. His mother is Paulette Bentley. He has three brothers, Shuler, Jake, and Brooks, who also play the quarterback position, and a sister Emily.
