= Bobby Bentley =

American football player and coach (born 1968)

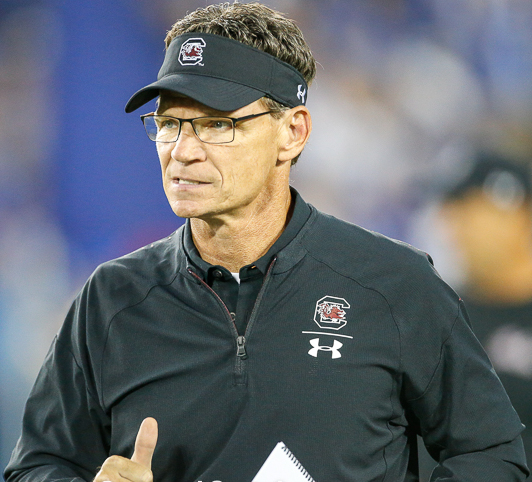
- Bentley with South Carolina in 2018

Current position
- Title: Head coach
- Team: Battle Ground Academy (TN)

Biographical details
- Born: August 30, 1968 (age 58); Duncan, South Carolina, U.S.

Playing career
- 1986–1989: Presbyterian
- Position: Quarterback

Coaching career (HC unless noted)
- 1990–1994: James F. Byrnes HS (SC) (assistant)
- 1995–2006: James F. Byrnes HS (SC)
- 2007–2008: Presbyterian
- 2013: James F. Byrnes HS (SC)
- 2014–2015: Auburn (off. analyst)
- 2016–2018: South Carolina (RB)
- 2019–2020: South Carolina (TE)
- 2021–2022: South Florida (WR/PGC)
- 2023: UCF (analyst)
- 2024–present: Battle Ground Academy (TN)

Administrative career (AD unless noted)
- 2009–2012: James F. Byrnes HS (SC)

Head coaching record
- Overall: 10–13 (college)

Accomplishments and honors

Championships
- 4 South Carolina AAAA Division II state (2002–2005)

Awards
- Nike National HS Coach of Year (2005); South Carolina HS Coach of Year (2006)

Bobby Bentley (born August 30, 1968) is an American football coach and former player. He currently serves as the head coach for college-preparatory school Battle Ground Academy. He was one of the most successful high school coaches in the country before going to his first collegiate head coaching job at Presbyterian.

== Playing career ==
Bentley played football at Presbyterian College before graduating in 1990.

== Coaching career ==
Bentley was head coach for 11 seasons at James F. Byrnes High School in Duncan, South Carolina after serving five years as an assistant coach. During that tenure at Byrnes, he led the school to four consecutive AAAA Division II state championships from 2002 to 2005.

In January 2007, Bentley was named head coach at Presbyterian College (PC). Returning to his alma mater to lead the school in its transition from Division II to Division Football Championship Subdivision, Bentley's team compiled a 6–5 record in his first season followed by a 4–8 season in 2008.

Bentley returned to Byrnes for one season in 2013 as an assistant to head coach Chris Miller. The Rebels earned a 12-2 record and Region II-4A title.

In February 2014, he again left Byrnes to become an offensive analyst at Auburn University. After a year in that position, in December 2015, Bentley accepted a coaching position with the University of South Carolina as the running backs coach.

Bentley was running backs coach from 2016-2018 before becoming the tight ends coach from 2019-2020.

In December 2020, Bentley was replaced as tight ends coach by Erik Kimrey. In January 2021, he was announced as the wide receivers coach and pass game coordinator at South Florida.

On July 26, 2023, he was announced to return as an analyst for Gus Malzahn at UCF.

== Personal life ==
Bentley has five children: Chas, Shuler, Jake, Brooks, and Emily.

== Head coaching record ==
=== College ===
Year	Team	Overall	Conference	Standing	Bowl/playoffs
Presbyterian Blue Hose (NCAA Division I FCS independent) (2007–2008)
2007	Presbyterian	6–5			
Presbyterian Blue Hose (Big South Conference) (2008)
2008	Presbyterian	4–8	1–4	T–5th	
Presbyterian:		10–13	1–4		
Total:		10-13			
