= Georgia–South Carolina football rivalry =

American college football rivalry

- Georgia Bulldogs South Carolina Gamecocks
- First meeting: November 3, 1894; Georgia, 40–0
- Latest meeting: November 21, 2026; Georgia, 34–6
- Next meeting: 2027

Statistics
- Total meetings: 76
- All-time series: Georgia leads 56–19–2
- Largest victory: Georgia, 48–7 (2022)
- Longest win streak: Georgia, 10 (1908–1941, 1966–1977)
- Current win streak: Georgia, 5 (2020–present)

Locations of Georgia and South Carolina

The Georgia–South Carolina football rivalry is an American college football rivalry between the Georgia Bulldogs and South Carolina Gamecocks. The series started in 1894 and was played intermittently over the next several decades. The series then became much more frequent, being played almost every year from 1958 to 1989. After the Gamecocks joined the Southeastern Conference (SEC), the rivalry was played annually from 1992 to 2023. There was a brief hiatus due to SEC expansion, (Note: The addition of Texas and Oklahoma to the SEC caused changes to the conference's scheduling in 2024. In 2025, the conference scheduling was the same as the year before, except for game sites changing to the other team's home stadium.) but the two teams became annual rivals again in 2026. Georgia leads the series 56–19–2.

Both of these SEC members coincidentally are flagship universities of their respective state systems, and are classified by the Carnegie Classification of Institutions of Higher Education as a Research I university, the same designation as their sibling science, technology, engineering, and mathematics schools from the ACC — with which they also have intense rivalries: Georgia's Clean, Old-Fashioned Hate rivalry with the Georgia Tech Yellow Jackets, and South Carolina's Palmetto Bowl game against the Clemson Tigers.

It has been described as South Carolina's "only true rivalry game" in the SEC, as well as a game that "may not have always had national significance, but always mattered in the South". The two programs are also rivals in recruiting, often pursuing many of the same players.

== Emergence of the rivalry ==
Traditionally, Georgia has had three main rivals: Georgia Tech, Auburn, and Florida.

- The two schools played periodically until South Carolina's entrance into the SEC in 1992.
- Recruiting battles have always existed between the two, but intensified due to South Carolina's success under head coach Steve Spurrier.
- Georgia's fan base has disliked former South Carolina football coach, Steve Spurrier, since his days as head coach at the University of Florida.
- The series between the two schools became especially competitive during the Steve Spurrier years, with Spurrier's Gamecocks holding an almost perfectly even 5–6 record against Georgia.
- The game has traditionally been nationally televised to a large audience (dating back to 1996, either on CBS, ESPN or ESPN2 except in 2016 and 2020).

They’ve got more rivals than almost anybody I know. They really do. Traditionally, we’ve only had Clemson because we haven’t beaten anybody enough to have any more rivals. Georgia, I’ve always said, is our biggest conference rival since they’re closest to us, I think, than any other school.

— Steve Spurrier, former South Carolina Head Coach, October 3, 2012

== Notable games ==
- 1980: One of the most memorable games was the 1980 game between Heisman Trophy hopefuls George Rogers and Herschel Walker. Led by Walker's 219 rushing yards, Georgia won 13–10 and went on to win the national title. Rogers turned in 168 rushing yards in the contest, setting the stage for a successful finish to his Heisman Trophy campaign. Walker, on the other hand, would finish 3rd in the Heisman Trophy voting and go on to win the award in 1982.
- 1984: This game was a memorable upset. Before the season began, Mike Hold, South Carolina's backup quarterback, was thinking about transferring to Arizona State. Offensive coordinator Frank Sadler had told Hold that as long as he was offensive coordinator, he would never play. Hold called his dad and announced he was transferring, but his dad told him to stay one more week for the Georgia game. Starting quarterback Allen Mitchell was injured, and Hold had a 66-yard quick kick and a 62-yard pass to Ira Hillary that set up the game-winning touchdown, which he scored on a two-yard run. The result was a 17–10 upset over #12 Georgia that jump started a 10–1 season. Hold later stayed and said that it "was the best decision I've ever made in my life."
- 1993: South Carolina defeated #14 Georgia in Athens 23–21 when running back Brandon Bennett dove over the pile into the end zone with two seconds left to give South Carolina just their 10th victory ever against Georgia.
- 2000: South Carolina's defense intercepted Heisman Trophy hopeful Quincy Carter five times in a 21–10 upset of the #10 Bulldogs in Columbia. The victory broke an 18-game SEC losing streak for the Gamecocks.
- 2002: Georgia linebacker David Pollack batted down and intercepted a pass from South Carolina quarterback Corey Jenkins in the South Carolina end zone. This memorable play jump-started a quiet Georgia team, leading to a 13–7 victory.
- 2004: Georgia fell down early 16–0 thanks to a pick-six and an amazing touchdown catch and run by Troy Williamson. However, David Greene led a second-half comeback, complete with a deep touchdown pass to Reggie Brown late in the fourth. Georgia won 20–16 and kept their SEC hopes alive.
- 2005: D. J. Shockley's first SEC start after being named the player of the week by the SEC for the opener against Boise State. The Heisman campaign by Shockley came crashing down against South Carolina as the Gamecocks stifled the Georgia offense. Georgia would survive and win 17–15.
- 2006: Georgia entered the game ranked #12 in what many believed (and later proved) to be a rebuilding year for the program. Joe Tereshinski started the game but was injured early on and Georgia was forced into playing the #1 QB recruit in true freshman Matthew Stafford. Stafford showed off his arm strength on a few throws, but ended up having a very freshman-like performance, throwing 3 interceptions. The Bulldogs relied on a stingy defense, that held South Carolina to only 35 yards on the ground in 22 attempts in the 18–0 win. Just a day prior, former UGA defensive coordinator Erk Russell had died. In a fitting tribute to a Georgia great, the Georgia defense posted their first shutout in three years and only the second shutout of Spurrier's coaching career.
- 2007: South Carolina's second win against Georgia in the Richt era. The Gamecocks won 16–12, holding off a late drive by Georgia and recording an interception to end the game. This game would go on to cost Georgia the SEC East and a chance at an SEC and even national title as Georgia's only other loss would be to Tennessee, who would go on to win the East because of a tiebreaker over Georgia. South Carolina would finish the year 6–6 after a 6–1 start and Georgia would beat Hawaii in the Sugar Bowl to finish ranked #2 in the AP Poll.
- 2008: The second-ranked Bulldogs won a low scoring game on particularly hot and humid day in Williams-Brice Stadium. A goal-line fumble forced by Rennie Curran and a late game interception from Reshad Jones preserved an otherwise unimpressive 14–7 victory.
- 2009: Considered an instant classic, South Carolina jumped all over the Bulldogs, taking an early 17–7 lead, but #21 Georgia stormed back and won a shootout, 41–37, sealed by a batted pass in the end zone by linebacker Rennie Curran.
- 2010: The matchup in Columbia highlighted the archetype of the rivalry – a low scoring defensive shootout. #24 South Carolina defeated #22 Georgia 17–6, pulling away late in the game. Freshman running back Marcus Lattimore ran for 182 yards on 37 carries in his SEC debut. This victory set the stage for South Carolina's run to the SEC Eastern division.
- 2011: The 2011 game proved to be almost identical to the 2009 game. The #12 Gamecocks defeated the unranked Bulldogs in Athens 45–42. South Carolina defensive end Melvin Ingram became the third player since 2006 to score a touchdown both on offense and defense in the same game, a 68-yard run on a fake punt and a 5-yard fumble return. He also recovered an onside kick late in the game to seal the victory for the Gamecocks. South Carolina was the division leader for the majority of the season until the Gamecocks lost to the Arkansas Razorbacks, resulting in a Bulldog berth in the championship game.
- 2012: #6 South Carolina defeated #5 Georgia 35–7 in front of a record crowd (85,199) at Williams-Brice Stadium, the highest-ranked matchup of the teams in series history and the first time the Gamecocks have won three in a row over the Bulldogs. It remains the largest margin of victory in the series for the Gamecocks.
- 2013: #11 Georgia snapped #6 South Carolina's three game win streak against the Bulldogs and got a 41–30 win. A career day by Georgia quarterback Aaron Murray who had 309 passing yards and 4 touchdowns to go along with 132 rushing yards and touchdown by running back Todd Gurley led the Georgia win.
- 2014 : #6 Georgia was favored to defeat #24 South Carolina. However, SC had other ideas, and took a 24–13 lead at the half thanks to 3 touchdowns passing from Dylan Thompson. South Carolina extended the lead to 31–20 with a short TD run from Thompson. Feeling pressure, Georgia QB Hutson Mason threw a TD to Jay Rome. The Dawgs got the 2-point conversion, and trailed 31–28. Brandon Wilds then ran for a TD to put the Gamecocks up 38–28. Georgia scored again to cut it to 38–35, and Dylan Thompson was intercepted in his own red-zone. Georgia couldn't move the ball and settled for a Marshall Morgan field goal. The kick went just right of the uprights and was no good. On the ensuing drive South Carolina converted a fourth and inches near midfield that allowed them to kneel the rest of the clock out, winning 38–35. The Gamecocks reached #13 two weeks later, but a loss to Missouri sent them out of the rankings and to a 7–6 finish. Georgia went 10–3 and narrowly missed out on an SEC East Title.
- 2016: This game was postponed to Sunday due to Hurricane Matthew and South Carolina and Georgia both had two new coaches in Will Muschamp and Kirby Smart (both of which had served as assistants under Nick Saban). Georgia won 28–14.
- 2017 : Led by freshman Jake Fromm (who took over for former 5-star Jacob Eason when he got hurt in the season opener) Georgia had reached #1 in the CFP poll, entering November with an 8–0 record. They were closely tested against a 6–2 South Carolina team, as Georgia led just 14–7 at halftime. Ultimately, Georgia hung on for a 24–10 win. Fromm went 16/22 for 196 yards and 2 TDS for Georgia.
- 2019 : Undefeated, No. 3 Georgia came into the game as a 24.5-point favorite at home against unranked South Carolina. South Carolina had lost 3 games, including one to North Carolina, who had previously gone 2–9 in 2018. Shockingly, South Carolina upset Georgia 20–17 in double overtime behind Israel Mukuamu's 3 interceptions, including one returned for a touchdown late in the second quarter. South Carolina would only win one more game after this against Vanderbilt and finish 4–8. Georgia would go on to finish 12–2 and lose the SEC Championship to LSU, but would rebound by defeating Baylor in the Sugar Bowl.

== Schedule change ==
In most years (with some exceptions post 2012 conerence expansion), since the Gamecocks joined the SEC in 1991, the game was the first conference game on the schedule for both teams. The game was typically held during the second week of the season with a non-conference game being played prior. The SEC eliminated divisions beginning with the 2024 season. As part of a two-year bridge agreement, the schools paused their annual series for 2024 and 2025. Beginning with the 2026 season, Georgia and South Carolina will once again meet every season as one of each schools' three annual opponents with the games held in Columbia in even numbered years and in Athens in odd-numbered years.

== Game results ==
Georgia victories	South Carolina victories	Tie games

No.	Date	Location	Winning team		Losing team	
1	October 3, 1894	Columbia, SC	Georgia	40	South Carolina	0
2	October 20, 1900	Athens, GA	Georgia	5	South Carolina	0
3	October 12, 1901	Augusta, GA	Georgia	10	South Carolina	5
4	October 17, 1903	Athens, GA	South Carolina	17	Georgia	0
5	October 26, 1904	Columbia, SC	South Carolina	2	Georgia	0
6	October 17, 1908	Athens, GA	Georgia	29	South Carolina	6
7	October 7, 1911	Athens, GA	Georgia	38	South Carolina	0
8	October 11, 1919	Athens, GA	Georgia	14	South Carolina	0
9	October 9, 1920	Columbia, SC	Georgia	37	South Carolina	0
10	October 4, 1924	Athens, GA	Georgia	18	South Carolina	0
11	October 2, 1937	Columbia, SC	Georgia	13	South Carolina	7
12	October 1, 1938	Columbia, SC	Georgia	7	South Carolina	6
13	November 18, 1939	Athens, GA	Georgia	33	South Carolina	7
14	October 5, 1940	Columbia, SC	Georgia	33	South Carolina	2
15	October 4, 1941	Athens, GA	Georgia	34	South Carolina	6
16	October 4, 1958	Athens, GA	South Carolina	24	Georgia	14
17	October 3, 1959	Columbia, SC	#16 South Carolina	30	#13 Georgia	14
18	October 1, 1960	Athens, GA	Georgia	38	South Carolina	6
19	October 7, 1961	Athens, GA	Georgia	17	South Carolina	14
20	October 6, 1962	Columbia, SC	Tie	7	Tie	7
21	October 5, 1963	Athens, GA	Georgia	27	South Carolina	7
22	October 3, 1964	Columbia, SC	Tie	7	Tie	7
23	October 1, 1966	Columbia, SC	Georgia	7	South Carolina	0
24	October 7, 1967	Athens, GA	#5 Georgia	21	South Carolina	0
25	October 5, 1968	Columbia, SC	#16 Georgia	21	South Carolina	20
26	October 4, 1969	Athens, GA	#7 Georgia	41	South Carolina	16
27	October 31, 1970	Athens, GA	Georgia	52	South Carolina	34
28	October 30, 1971	Columbia, SC	#7 Georgia	24	South Carolina	0
29	September 28, 1974	Athens, GA	Georgia	52	South Carolina	14
30	September 27, 1975	Columbia, SC	Georgia	28	South Carolina	20
31	September 25, 1976	Athens, GA	#7 Georgia	20	South Carolina	12
32	September 24, 1977	Columbia, SC	Georgia	15	South Carolina	13
33	September 30, 1978	Columbia, SC	South Carolina	27	#19 Georgia	10
34	September 29, 1979	Athens, GA	South Carolina	27	Georgia	20
35	November 1, 1980	Athens, GA	#4 Georgia	13	#14 South Carolina	10
36	September 26, 1981	Athens, GA	#17 Georgia	24	South Carolina	0
37	September 25, 1982	Columbia, SC	#7 Georgia	34	South Carolina	18
38	September 24, 1983	Athens, GA	#14 Georgia	31	South Carolina	13
39	September 29, 1984	Columbia, SC	South Carolina	17	#12 Georgia	10

No.	Date	Location	Winning team		Losing team	
40	September 28, 1985	Athens, GA	Georgia	35	South Carolina	21
41	September 27, 1986	Columbia, SC	Georgia	31	South Carolina	26
42	September 26, 1987	Athens, GA	Georgia	13	South Carolina	6
43	September 24, 1988	Columbia, SC	#14 South Carolina	23	#6 Georgia	10
44	September 30, 1989	Athens, GA	South Carolina	24	#23 Georgia	20
45	September 5, 1992	Columbia, SC	#14 Georgia	28	South Carolina	6
46	September 4, 1993	Athens, GA	South Carolina	23	#14 Georgia	21
47	September 3, 1994	Columbia, SC	Georgia	24	South Carolina	21
48	September 2, 1995	Athens, GA	Georgia	42	South Carolina	23
49	September 14, 1996	Columbia, SC	South Carolina	23	Georgia	14
50	September 13, 1997	Athens, GA	#25 Georgia	31	South Carolina	15
51	September 12, 1998	Columbia, SC	#13 Georgia	17	South Carolina	3
52	September 11, 1999	Athens, GA	#12 Georgia	24	South Carolina	9
53	September 9, 2000	Columbia, SC	South Carolina	21	#10 Georgia	10
54	September 8, 2001	Athens, GA	#21 South Carolina	14	#25 Georgia	9
55	September 14, 2002	Columbia, SC	#10 Georgia	13	South Carolina	7
56	September 13, 2003	Athens, GA	#8 Georgia	31	#25 South Carolina	7
57	September 11, 2004	Columbia, SC	#4 Georgia	20	South Carolina	16
58	September 10, 2005	Athens, GA	#9 Georgia	17	South Carolina	15
59	September 9, 2006	Columbia, SC	#12 Georgia	18	South Carolina	0
60	September 8, 2007	Athens, GA	South Carolina	16	#11 Georgia	12
61	September 13, 2008	Columbia, SC	#2 Georgia	14	South Carolina	7
62	September 12, 2009	Athens, GA	#21 Georgia	41	South Carolina	37
63	September 11, 2010	Columbia, SC	#24 South Carolina	17	#22 Georgia	6
64	September 10, 2011	Athens, GA	#12 South Carolina	45	Georgia	42
65	October 6, 2012	Columbia, SC	#6 South Carolina	35	#5 Georgia	7
66	September 7, 2013	Athens, GA	#11 Georgia	41	#6 South Carolina	30
67	September 13, 2014	Columbia, SC	#24 South Carolina	38	#6 Georgia	35
68	September 19, 2015	Athens, GA	#7 Georgia	52	South Carolina	20
69	October 9, 2016	Columbia, SC	Georgia	28	South Carolina	14
70	November 4, 2017	Athens, GA	#1 Georgia	24	South Carolina	10
71	September 8, 2018	Columbia, SC	#3 Georgia	41	#24 South Carolina	17
72	October 12, 2019	Athens, GA	South Carolina	20	#3 Georgia	17 ^{2OT}
73	November 28, 2020	Columbia, SC	#9 Georgia	45	South Carolina	16
74	September 18, 2021	Athens, GA	#2 Georgia	40	South Carolina	13
75	September 17, 2022	Columbia, SC	#1 Georgia	48	South Carolina	7
76	September 16, 2023	Athens, GA	#1 Georgia	24	South Carolina	14
77	November 21, 2026	Columbia, SC	#1 Georgia	34	#21 South Carolina	6
Series: Georgia leads 56–19–2

== Border Bash ==
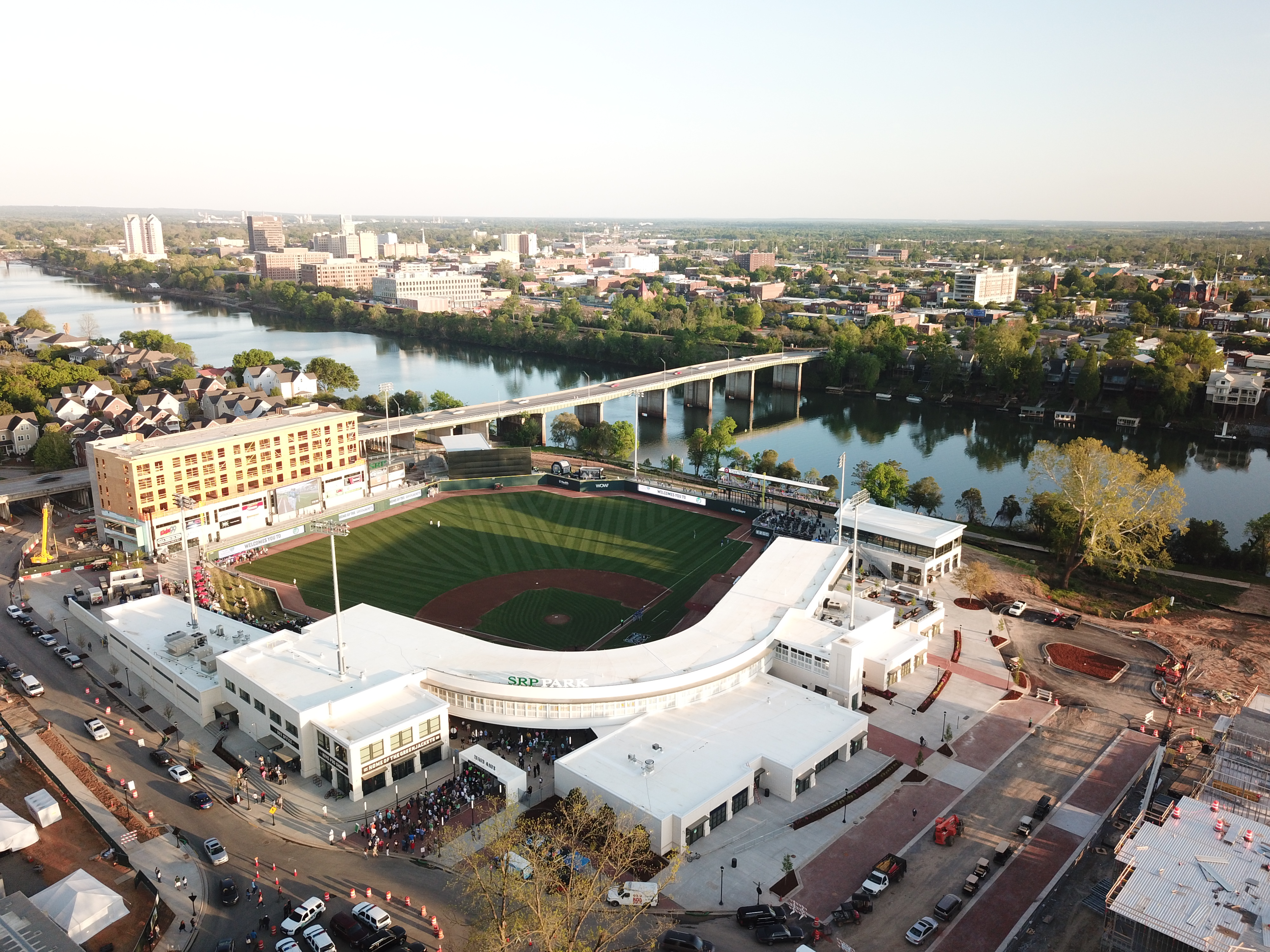
The last Border Bash in 2023 was held in SRP Park in North Augusta, South Carolina

Since 1994, the "Border Bash" has been held as a charity tailgate event in the Augusta metropolitan area before every Georgia–South Carolina football game. For decades, it was only held in Georgia (Augusta), but it was held in South Carolina (North Augusta) for the first time in 2017. The event is supported by numerous business and private sponsors from both sides of the Savannah River. The evening event draws thousands of fans from both fan-bases, and proceeds are used to support numerous children's charities from around the CSRA through the Border Bash Foundation. Both mascots, as well as each program's cheerleaders, represent their programs at the event along with various dignitaries from the schools themselves. Neither the football coaches or the ballplayers attend due to conflicts with their pregame preparations.

== See also ==
- List of NCAA college football rivalry games

== Additional sources ==
- The Tuscaloosa News – Google News Archive Search
- Waycross Journal-Herald – Google News Archive Search
- No rivalry in area tops Bulldogs vs. Gamecocks | The Augusta Chronicle
