= Johnny Dixon (American football) =

American football player (born 2001)

Profile
- Position: Cornerback

Personal information
- Born: January 3, 2001 (age 25); Tampa, Florida, U.S.
- Listed height: 5 ft 11 in (1.80 m)
- Listed weight: 192 lb (87 kg)

Career information
- High school: Chamberlain (Tampa)
- College: Penn State (2021–2023), South Carolina (2019–2020)
- NFL draft: 2024: undrafted

Career history
- BC Lions (2025)*
- * Offseason or practice squad member only

John J. Dixon (born January 3, 2001) is an American football free agent cornerback. He previously played for the Penn State Nittany Lions and the South Carolina Gamecocks.

== Early life ==
Dixon attended George D. Chamberlain High School in Tampa, Florida. He committed to the University of South Carolina to play college football.

== College career ==
Dixon played at South Carolina in 2019 and 2020. In two seasons, he had 37 tackles and an interception. Dixon transferred to Penn State University in 2021. In his first season at Penn State, he played in 12 games and had 10 tackles. In 2022, he played in 13 games with six starts and recorded 23 tackles, two interceptions and three sacks. As a senior in 2023, Dixon had 26 tackles, one interception and 4.5 sacks. He was selected to play in the 2024 Senior Bowl.

== Professional career ==
Pre-draft measurables
Height	Weight	Arm length	Hand span	Wingspan
5 ft 10 3/4 in (1.80 m)	188 lb (85 kg)	29 1/2 in (0.75 m)	8 5/8 in (0.22 m)	6 ft 0 in (1.83 m)
All values from NFL Combine

Dixon went undrafted in the 2024 NFL Draft. He did not sign with a professional team during the 2024 offseason as he rehabilitated a hip injury which he sustained during the 2024 Senior Bowl.

=== BC Lions ===
On March 12, 2025, Dixon signed as a defensive back with the BC Lions of the Canadian Football League (CFL). On May 11, 2025, Dixon was suspended by the CFL. On May 14, 2025, Dixon's suspension was lifted and he was reinstated on the Lions' active roster. He was released on June 1, 2025.
