= James F. Byrnes High School =

Public high school in Duncan, South Carolina

Location
- 150 East Main Street; Duncan, South Carolina 29334; United States; 34°56′2″N 82°7′39″W

Information
- School type: Public, secondary
- Motto: Discere est Vincere (To learn is to conquer)
- Established: 1955
- School district: Spartanburg County School District 5
- Superintendent: Randall Gary
- CEEB code: 410670
- Principal: Erin Greenway
- Teaching staff: 123.61 (FTE)
- Grades: 9–12
- Gender: Co-educational
- Enrollment: 2,315 (2023–2024)
- Student to teacher ratio: 18.73
- Campus type: Suburban
- Colors: Royal blue and gray
- Mascot: Rebel
- Newspaper: The Spotlight
- Website: spart5.net/bhs

James F. Byrnes High School is a public high school located in Duncan, South Carolina. A part of Spartanburg County School District 5, it is named after the former Governor of South Carolina and U.S. Secretary of State, James F. Byrnes. The current principal is Erin Greenway.

The James F. Byrnes Freshman Academy is situated at the former location of D. R. Hill Middle School.

== History ==
- James F. Byrnes high school was established in 1955 in Duncan, SC, named after former Governor of South Carolina and U.S. Secretary of State, James F. Byrnes
- The opening year there were 21 teachers and 500 students in grades 9–12. The school population has had trends of significant growth since then. In 1969, students in grades 10-12 attended Byrnes high and all ninth-grade students attended Florence Chapel School. In 1971, the ninth grade moved back to Byrnes High School. In 2007, the ninth grade moved to Byrnes Freshman Academy. Presently there are 2315 students and 124 faculty and staff. There are approximately 850 students and 50 staff members at the Byrnes Freshman Academy.

== Campus Additions & renovations ==
- The Byrnes High School campus has undergone many additions and renovations and is currently undergoing construction. The new expansion is the most extensive of all the projects in Spartanburg County District Five's growth plan. The new construction and renovations aimed to modernize the campus, and replace the schools original wing, which has stood since the 1950s. Construction included 127,401 square foot additions consisting of 42 additional classrooms and science labs. The addition added a brand new, state of the art media center and new administration and guidance wing. The three-story building features collaborative work spaces for students and staff, a satellite food service station to assist in feeding students, and enhanced storage space to house the district's technology needs. Construction began on Phase 2 of the Byrnes project in July 2022, And finished near the start of the 2024–25 school year.

=== New Athletic Facilities ===
- In March 2024 Members of the District Five board voted on a bond referendum (no referendum money was spent) to demolish the old facility at Nixon Field, and construct a new state of the art facility at the site, including a new stadium with seating for over 8,000 people, a larger parking lot accommodating at least 100 more vehicles than what the current stadium parking lot can handle, a spectator entrance plaza, upgraded concession and ticket stands, a turf field rotated 90 degrees from the original, track and field storage shed, new locker room facilities and a security room, just a few of the amenities featured in the presentation. In the summer the board gave approval and on June 5, 2024, Demolition began on the old site. On July 29, 2024, a ground-breaking ceremony was held where construction began. And in August 2025 the project was completed.

== Notable alumni ==
- Bobby Bentley, University of South Florida Football staff 2021–Present, University of South Carolina Football staff 2016–2021, Auburn University Football staff 2014–2016, and former Presbyterian College Head Football Coach
- Scott Cooper, Wofford College Philadelphia Phillies (1994) pitcher. minor league system. Career ending shoulder injury in 1995.
- Everett Dawkins, Tampa Bay Buccaneers and former Florida State University defensive tackle
- Chas Dodd, former Rutgers University quarterback, All-Big East Freshman Team
- Steven Duggar, (born 1993), Major League Baseball player for the San Francisco Giants
- Daniel Gossett, Major League Baseball pitcher for the Oakland Athletics
- Willy Korn, Coastal Carolina University co-offensive coordinator and quarterbacks coach, and former Clemson University and North Greenville University quarterback
- Marcus Lattimore, San Francisco 49ers and former University of South Carolina running back, National Freshman of the Year, 2009 SC Mr. Football
- Samuel J. Locklear, US Navy 4-star admiral
- Prince Miller, Saskatchewan Roughriders and former Detroit Lions and University of Georgia cornerback, 2005 SC Mr. Football
- Bradley Robinson, Edmonton Eskimos and former Middle Tennessee State University cornerback

== See also ==
- List of high schools in South Carolina
