= Marcus Lattimore =

American football player (born 1991)

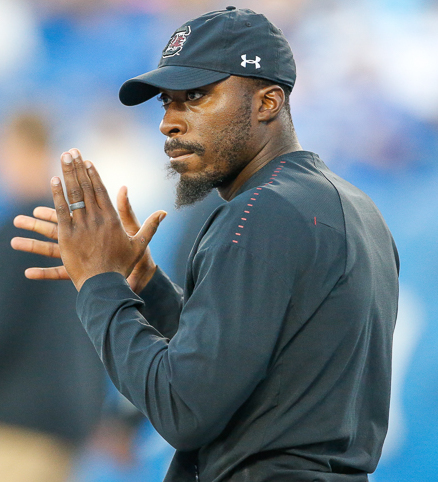
- Lattimore in 2018

No. 38
- Position: Running back

Personal information
- Born: October 29, 1991 (age 35); Duncan, South Carolina, U.S.
- Listed height: 5 ft 11 in (1.80 m)
- Listed weight: 221 lb (100 kg)

Career information
- High school: Byrnes (Duncan)
- College: South Carolina (2010–2012)
- NFL draft: 2013: 4th round, 131st overall pick

Career history

Playing
- San Francisco 49ers (2013–2014)

Coaching
- Columbia (SC) Heathwood Hall Episcopal HS (2016) Running backs coach; Columbia (SC) Heathwood Hall Episcopal HS (2017) Head coach; South Carolina (2018–2020) Director of player development; Lewis & Clark College (2020–present) Running backs coach

Awards and highlights
- Second-team All-American (2010); First-team All-SEC (2010); Second-team All-SEC (2011); SN Freshman of the Year (2010); SEC Freshman of the Year (2010)
- Stats at Pro Football Reference

Marcus Lattimore (born October 29, 1991) is an American former professional football player who was a running back for the San Francisco 49ers of the National Football League (NFL). He played college football for the South Carolina Gamecocks, where he holds the career record for rushing touchdowns (38). He rushed for 1,197 yards as a starter during his freshman year, earning All-American honors. His sophomore and junior years were truncated by severe knee injuries. He opted to forgo his senior year and was selected by San Francisco in the fourth round of the 2013 NFL draft. He never played a game for the 49ers and retired from playing football at the age of 23. In 2016, he was named head football coach at Heathwood Hall prep school in Columbia, South Carolina. He served as the Director of Player Development for the South Carolina Gamecocks from 2018 to 2019.

== Early life ==
Lattimore was born in Duncan, South Carolina. He attended Florence Chapel Middle School and James F. Byrnes High School in Duncan, and played high school football for the Byrnes Rebels. One of the most decorated players in South Carolina high school football history, Lattimore was ESPN RISE National High School Junior Football Player of the Year in 2008. In his senior year, he earned USA Today high school All-American honors, was named South Carolina's Mr. Football, and played in the 2010 U.S. Army All-American Bowl. He chose South Carolina over Auburn on National Signing Day.

== College career ==
Lattimore enrolled in the University of South Carolina, where he played for coach Steve Spurrier's South Carolina Gamecocks football team from 2010 to 2012. A highly sought-after college recruit, he made an immediate impact for the Gamecocks as a freshman.

=== 2010 ===
On September 11, 2010, in just his second career college football game, Lattimore broke 42 tackles on 37 carries, rushing for 182 yards and two touchdowns against the Georgia Bulldogs. On October 9, 2010, against the then #1 ranked Alabama Crimson Tide, Lattimore had 23 carries for 93 yards, two rushing touchdowns, and caught one receiving touchdown from quarterback Stephen Garcia. On October 16, 2010, Lattimore scored two touchdowns in a road loss to the Kentucky Wildcats before missing the rest of the game with an ankle injury. On October 30, 2010, against the Tennessee Volunteers, Lattimore had 29 carries for 184 yards and one rushing touchdown. On November 13, 2010, against the Florida Gators in Gainesville, Lattimore had 40 carries for 212 yards and three rushing touchdowns, to defeat the Gators and clinch the SEC East for the Gamecocks.

On December 4, 2010, in the 2010 SEC Championship Game, Lattimore had 16 carries for 84 yards for the Gamecocks in the 56–17 loss to the Auburn Tigers. In December 2010, Lattimore was named the NCAA Freshman of the Year, headlining the All-Freshman Team, by The Sporting News. On December 31, 2010, in the 2010 Chick-fil-A Bowl, Lattimore had one carry that went for a one-yard loss and caught three passes for 48 yards, before sustaining a concussion in the first quarter on a pass reception in which he lost a fumble in a 26–17 loss to Florida State.

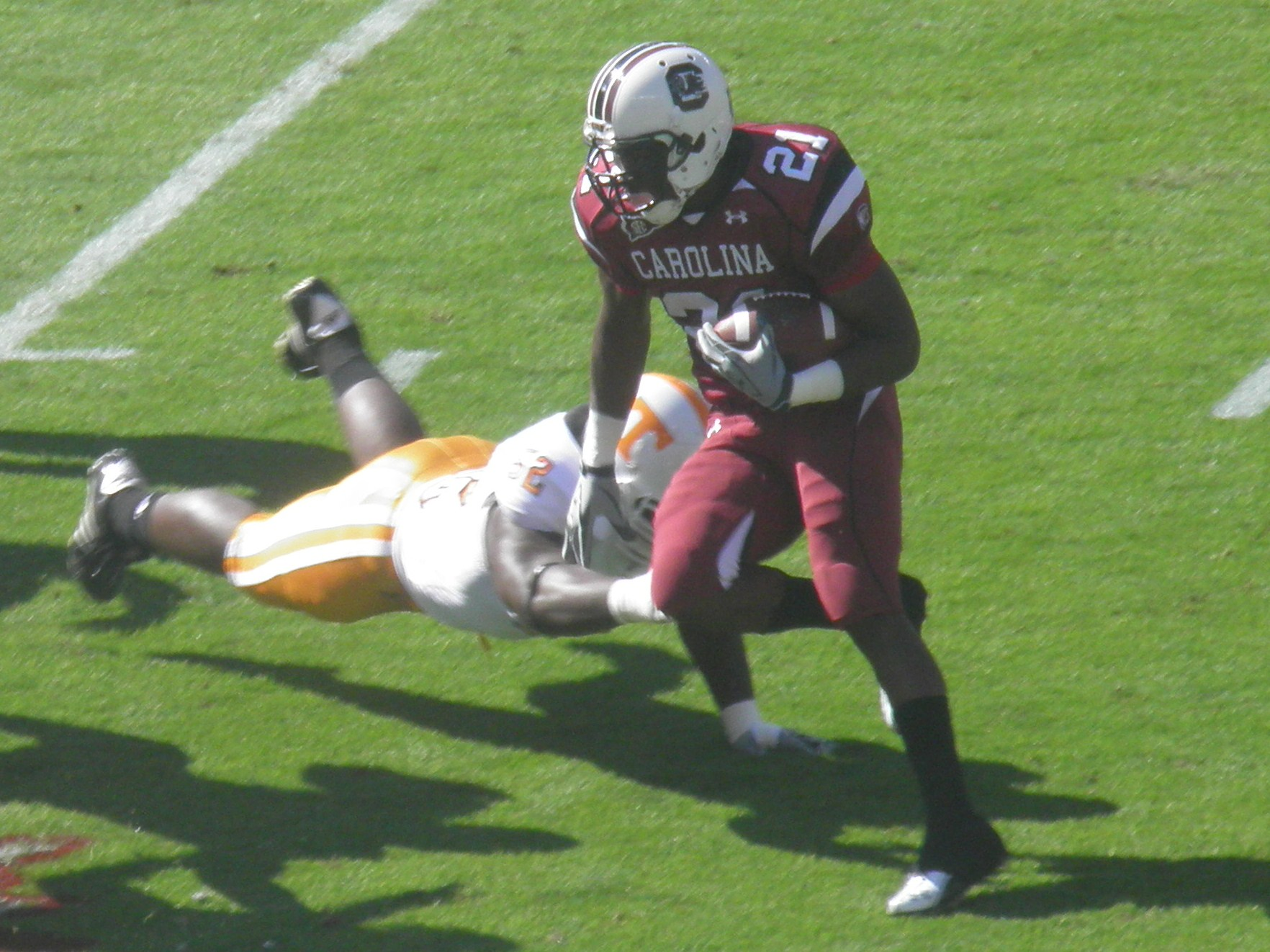
Lattimore with South Carolina in 2010.

=== 2011 ===
South Carolina began their 2011 season at the Bank of America Stadium in Charlotte on September 3, 2011, against East Carolina. He rushed for 112 yards on 23 carries and added three touchdowns as the Gamecocks battled back to win 56–37. Lattimore also caught three passes for 33 yards.

The Gamecocks traveled to Athens on September 10 to play SEC East rivals Georgia. Lattimore carried the ball on 27 occasions for 176 yards and one touchdown.

South Carolina then played a home game against the Naval Academy, and in a 24–21 game Lattimore ran 246 yards, and also scored three touchdowns in the game. The following weekend, South Carolina played host to SEC East foe Vanderbilt. Lattimore had his first sub-100-yard rushing game of the season, running for just 77 yards on 20 carries but was able to add a 22-yard touchdown. He also caught three passes for 73 yards, scoring on a 52-yard reception, leading his team to a 21–3 win and a 4–0 start. He tore a knee ligament on October 15 against the Mississippi State Bulldogs and it was announced that Lattimore would miss the remainder of the 2011 season due to the injury.

=== 2012 ===
In Lattimore's first game back following his knee ligament injury, he rushed for 110 yards and two touchdowns on 23 carries as the Gamecocks topped Vanderbilt, 17–13. In the Gamecocks' 49–6 victory over UAB on September 15, Lattimore rushed for 85 yards and one touchdown, his 34th touchdown at South Carolina, surpassing George Rogers's school record of 33 career touchdowns. Lattimore turned in his best performance of the season against the Kentucky Wildcats, rushing for 120 yards and two touchdowns in a 38–17 win on September 29.

On October 6, the Gamecocks played host to the Georgia Bulldogs in a top ten showdown for which ESPN College Gameday was in town. Lattimore ran for 109 yards and a score as the Gamecocks crushed No. 5 Georgia, 35–7, and posted two school records, three straight wins over Georgia and ten straight victories in all.

On October 27, Lattimore suffered a major injury to his right knee during a game against the Tennessee Volunteers. South Carolina football head coach Steve Spurrier stated that Lattimore had dislocated his right knee and torn every ligament, while also suffering nerve damage. Lattimore's knee was surgically repaired by Dr. James Andrews.

On December 10, Lattimore declared himself eligible for the 2013 NFL Draft.

=== College statistics ===
Season	Team	GP	Rushing				Receiving			
Season	Team	GP	Att	Yds	Avg	TD	Rec	Yds	Avg	TD
2010	South Carolina	13	249	1,197	4.8	17	29	412	14.2	2
2011	South Carolina	7	163	818	5.0	10	19	182	9.6	1
2012	South Carolina	9	143	662	4.6	11	26	173	6.7	0
Career		29	555	2,677	4.8	38	74	767	10.4	3

=== College awards and honors ===
- Second-team All-SEC (2011)
- First-team All-SEC (2010)
- Second-team All-American (2010)
- SN Freshman of the Year (2010)
- SEC Freshman of the Year (2010)

== Professional career ==
Pre-draft measurables
Height	Weight	Arm length	Hand span
5 ft 11 1/4 in (1.81 m)	221 lb (100 kg)	32 1/2 in (0.83 m)	9 7/8 in (0.25 m)
All values from NFL Combine

On December 12, 2012, Lattimore confirmed in a press conference that he would enter the 2013 NFL draft. On April 27, 2013, he was selected in the fourth round, with the 131st overall pick, by the San Francisco 49ers. On May 31, the 49ers signed Lattimore to a 4-year deal worth $2,460,584 including a signing bonus of $300,584. On August 27, he was placed on the reserve/non-football injury list.

On November 5, 2014, Lattimore announced his retirement from the NFL.

== Coaching career ==
In mid-December 2015, Lattimore announced that he would join the staff of newly appointed South Carolina head coach Will Muschamp. Lattimore would not be a coach, but would talk to the players about life off the field, similar to his work at his leadership academies through his foundation. However, in April 2016, the NCAA indicated that the university would gain an unfair recruiting advantage by hiring Lattimore, due to his work with high school kids through his foundation. Lattimore indicated that the NCAA ruling was fair, and that he would not be joining South Carolina's staff. On May 6, 2016, it was announced that Lattimore would be joining the football staff at Heathwood Hall Episcopal School in Columbia, South Carolina. Lattimore was named head football coach at Heathwood on November 14, 2016. On January 11, 2018, it was announced that Lattimore would be joining Will Muschamp's coaching staff at South Carolina as Director of Player Development. He left this position on January 10, 2020. As of summer 2020, Lattimore serves as running backs coach at Lewis and Clark College.

== Personal life ==
On December 19, 2015, Lattimore married his high school sweetheart Miranda Bailey. He is a Christian.
