= 2020 South Carolina Gamecocks football team =

American college football season

2020 South Carolina Gamecocks football
- Conference: Southeastern Conference
- East Division
- Record: 2–8 (2–8 SEC)
- Head coach: Will Muschamp (5th season; first 7 games); Mike Bobo (interim; remainder of the year)
- Offensive coordinator: Mike Bobo (1st season)
- Offensive scheme: Pro-style
- Defensive coordinator: Travaris Robinson (5th season)
- Base defense: Multiple 4–3
- Home stadium: Williams–Brice Stadium

Uniform
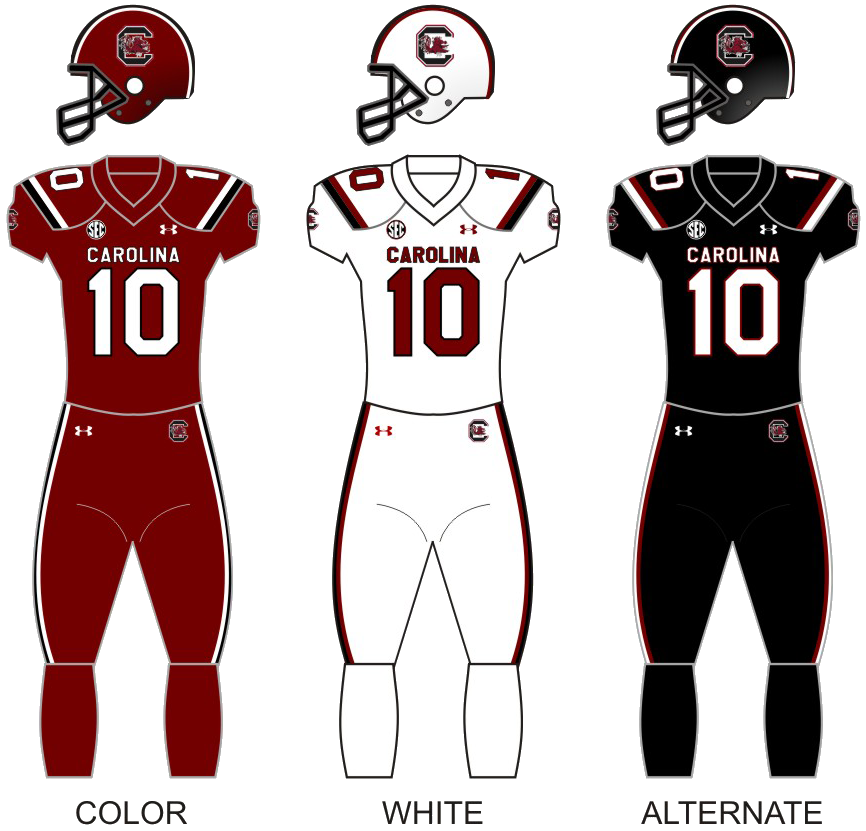

2020 Southeastern Conference football standings
	Conf.			Overall
Team	W		L	W		L
Eastern Division
No. 13 Florida x	8	–	2	8	–	4
No. 7 Georgia	7	–	2	8	–	2
Missouri	5	–	5	5	–	5
Kentucky	4	–	6	5	–	6
Tennessee*	3	–	7	3	–	7
South Carolina	2	–	8	2	–	8
Vanderbilt	0	–	9	0	–	9
Western Division
No. 1 Alabama x$#^	10	–	0	13	–	0
No. 4 Texas A&M	8	–	1	9	–	1
Auburn	6	–	4	6	–	5
LSU*	5	–	5	5	–	5
Ole Miss	4	–	5	5	–	5
Arkansas	3	–	7	3	–	7
Mississippi State	3	–	7	4	–	7
Championship: Alabama 52, Florida 46
# – College Football Playoff champion; ^ – College Football Playoff participant; $ – Conference champion; x – Division champion/co-champions; * – Tennessee vacated all wins due to NCAA violations. LSU was ineligible for postseason due to self imposed ban. Note: Due to COVID-19, the SEC played a conference-only schedule.; Rankings from AP Poll.

The 2020 South Carolina Gamecocks football team (variously South Carolina, USC, SC, or The Gamecocks) represented the University of South Carolina in the 2020 NCAA Division I FBS football season. The season marked the Gamecocks' 127th overall season, and 29th as a member of the SEC East Division. The Gamecocks played their home games at Williams–Brice Stadium in Columbia, South Carolina, and were led by head coach Will Muschamp until his firing on November 15. Mike Bobo, the team's offensive coordinator and quarterbacks coach, was named interim head coach for the remainder of the season.

Due to the COVID-19 pandemic, South Carolina played a ten-game all-conference schedule in 2020. The Gamecocks did not play their archrival Clemson for the first time since 1908. Home games were extremely regulated, limited to approximately 15,000 season ticket holders and a small number of other spectators, all required to wear masks. The Gamecocks compiled a 2–8 record, their fourth losing season in six years. The team accepted a bid to the Gasparilla Bowl, as the NCAA had waived bowl eligibility requirements for the season. The Gamecocks were slated to play UAB, but had to withdraw on December 22 due to COVID-19 issues within the program.

== Preseason ==
=== 2020 recruiting class ===
College recruiting
Name	Hometown	School	Height	Weight	Commit date
Jordan Burch; DE	Columbia, SC	Hammond	6 ft 5 in (1.96 m)	275 lb (125 kg)	Dec 18, 2019
Jordan Burch; DE	Recruit ratings: Scout: Rivals: 247Sports: ESPN: (91)				
MarShawn Lloyd; RB	Hyattsville, MD	DeMatha	5 ft 9 in (1.75 m)	211 lb (96 kg)	May 27, 2019
MarShawn Lloyd; RB	Recruit ratings: Scout: Rivals: 247Sports: ESPN: (85)				
Luke Doty; QB	Myrtle Beach, SC	Myrtle Beach	6 ft 1 in (1.85 m)	185 lb (84 kg)	Jul 31, 2018
Luke Doty; QB	Recruit ratings: Scout: Rivals: 247Sports: ESPN: (84)				
Tonka Hemingway; DT	Conway, SC	Conway	6 ft 2 in (1.88 m)	259 lb (117 kg)	Aug 15, 2019
Tonka Hemingway; DT	Recruit ratings: Scout: Rivals: 247Sports: ESPN: (82)				
Mike Wyman; WR	Greensboro, NC	Dudley	6 ft 2 in (1.88 m)	188 lb (85 kg)	Apr 16, 2019
Mike Wyman; WR	Recruit ratings: Scout: Rivals: 247Sports: ESPN: (82)				
Alex Huntley; DT	Columbia, SC	Hammond	6 ft 3 in (1.91 m)	279 lb (127 kg)	Jun 8, 2019
Alex Huntley; DT	Recruit ratings: Scout: Rivals: 247Sports: ESPN: (81)				
Mohamed Kaba; LB	Clinton, NC	Clinton	6 ft 2 in (1.88 m)	212 lb (96 kg)	May 9, 2019
Mohamed Kaba; LB	Recruit ratings: Scout: Rivals: 247Sports: ESPN: (81)				
Tyshawn Wannamaker; OG	Saint Matthews, SC	Calhoun County	6 ft 3 in (1.91 m)	315 lb (143 kg)	Apr 21, 2018
Tyshawn Wannamaker; OG	Recruit ratings: Scout: Rivals: 247Sports: ESPN: (81)				
Rico Powers; WR	Atlanta, GA	Hapeville Charter	6 ft 1 in (1.85 m)	183 lb (83 kg)	Sep 17, 2019
Rico Powers; WR	Recruit ratings: Scout: Rivals: 247Sports: ESPN: (80)				
Jaheim Bell; WR	Valdosta, GA	Valdosta	6 ft 2 in (1.88 m)	210 lb (95 kg)	Dec 18, 2019
Jaheim Bell; WR	Recruit ratings: Scout: Rivals: 247Sports: ESPN: (80)				
Eric Shaw; TE	Notasulga, AL	Reeltown	6 ft 4 in (1.93 m)	205 lb (93 kg)	Aug 15, 2019
Eric Shaw; TE	Recruit ratings: Scout: Rivals: 247Sports: ESPN: (80)				
Joey Hunter; CB	Tyrone, GA	Sandy Creek	6 ft 1 in (1.85 m)	185 lb (84 kg)	Jul 2, 2019
Joey Hunter; CB	Recruit ratings: Scout: Rivals: 247Sports: ESPN: (78)				
ZaQuandre White; RB	North Fort Myers, FL	Iowa Western CC	6 ft 2 in (1.88 m)	210 lb (95 kg)	Feb 5, 2020
ZaQuandre White; RB	Recruit ratings: Scout: Rivals: 247Sports: ESPN: (78)				
Vershon Lee; OG	Woodbridge, VA	Freedom	6 ft 3 in (1.91 m)	300 lb (140 kg)	Jun 18, 2019
Vershon Lee; OG	Recruit ratings: Scout: Rivals: 247Sports: ESPN: (77)				
Ger-Cari Caldwell; WR	Rock Hill, SC	Northwestern	6 ft 4 in (1.93 m)	185 lb (84 kg)	Feb 5, 2020
Ger-Cari Caldwell; WR	Recruit ratings: Scout: Rivals: 247Sports: ESPN: (76)				
Jazston Turnetine; OT	Hutchinson, KS	Hutchinson CC	6 ft 8 in (2.03 m)	340 lb (150 kg)	Jun 2, 2019
Jazston Turnetine; OT	Recruit ratings: Scout: Rivals: 247Sports: ESPN: (76)				
O'Donnell Fortune; CB	Sumter, SC	Sumter	6 ft 2 in (1.88 m)	175 lb (79 kg)	Jun 7, 2019
O'Donnell Fortune; CB	Recruit ratings: Scout: Rivals: 247Sports: ESPN: (75)				
Dominick Hill; ATH	Orlando, FL	Jones	6 ft 1 in (1.85 m)	176 lb (80 kg)	Jun 20, 2019
Dominick Hill; ATH	Recruit ratings: Scout: Rivals: 247Sports: ESPN: (75)				
Makius Scott; DT	Gainesville, GA	Gainesville	6 ft 3 in (1.91 m)	305 lb (138 kg)	Jun 7, 2019
Makius Scott; DT	Recruit ratings: Scout: Rivals: 247Sports: ESPN: (75)				
Kai Kroeger; K	Lake Forest, IL	Lake Forest	6 ft 3 in (1.91 m)	190 lb (86 kg)	Jul 30, 2019
Kai Kroeger; K	Recruit ratings: Scout: Rivals: 247Sports: ESPN: (75)				
Trai Jones; OG	Abbeville, SC	Abbeville	6 ft 2 in (1.88 m)	265 lb (120 kg)	Jun 8, 2019
Trai Jones; OG	Recruit ratings: Scout: Rivals: 247Sports: ESPN: (74)				
Gilber Edmond; DE	Fort Pierce, FL	Fort Pierce Westwood	6 ft 4 in (1.93 m)	215 lb (98 kg)	Feb 5, 2020
Gilber Edmond; DE	Recruit ratings: Scout: Rivals: 247Sports: ESPN: (74)				
Mitch Jeter; K	Concord, NC	Cannon School	5 ft 11 in (1.80 m)	175 lb (79 kg)	Dec 14, 2019
Mitch Jeter; K	Recruit ratings: Scout: Rivals: 247Sports: ESPN: (74)				
Rashad Amos; RB	Tyrone, GA	Sandy Creek	6 ft 0 in (1.83 m)	205 lb (93 kg)	Nov 12, 2019
Rashad Amos; RB	Recruit ratings: Scout: Rivals: 247Sports: ESPN: (72)				
Overall recruit ranking: Scout: 18 Rivals: 17 247Sports: 13 ESPN: 20
Note: In many cases, Scout, Rivals, 247Sports, On3, and ESPN may conflict in their listings of height and weight.; In these cases, the average was taken. ESPN grades are on a 100-point scale.; Sources: "2020 South Carolina Football Commitment List". Rivals.; "2020 South Carolina Commits". Scout.; "2020 commits". ESPN.; "Scout.com Team Recruiting Rankings". Scout.; "2020 Team Ranking". Rivals.com.; "2020 South Carolina Gamecocks football team". 247Sports.

=== Offseason departures ===
2020 South Carolina offseason departures
Name	Number	Pos.	Height	Weight	Year	Hometown	Notes
Javon Kinlaw	#3	DT	6'5	319	Senior	Goose Creek, SC	Declared for 2020 NFL draft
Bryan Edwards	#89	WR	6'3	212	Senior	Conway, SC	Declared for 2020 NFL draft
D. J. Wonnum	#8	DE	6'5	260	Senior	Stone Mountain, GA	Declared for 2020 NFL draft
T. J. Brunson	#6	LB	6'1	229	Senior	Columbia, SC	Declared for 2020 NFL draft
Rico Dowdle	#5	HB	5'11	213	Senior	Asheville, NC	Graduated
Tavien Feaster	#4	HB	6'0	221	Senior	Spartanburg, SC	Graduated
Kyle Markway	#84	TE	6'4	250	RS Senior	St. Louis, MO	Graduated
Donell Stanley	#72	OL	6'3	322	RS Senior	Floydale, SC	Graduated
Joseph Charlton	#20	P	6'5	190	RS Senior	Columbia, SC	Graduated
Mon Denson	#34	HB	5'10	215	RS Senior	LaGrange, GA	Graduated
Kobe Smith	#95	DL	6'2	300	Senior	Lawrenceville, GA	Graduated
Daniel Fennell	#35	DL	6'2	255	RS Senior	Loganville, GA	Graduated
Chavis Dawkins	#83	WR	6'2	225	Senior	Duncan, SC	Graduated

=== SEC Media Days ===
In the preseason media poll, South Carolina was predicted to finish in fifth place in the East Division.

Media poll (East Division)
Predicted finish	Team	Votes (1st place)
1	Florida	624 (53)
2	Georgia	613 (43)
3	Tennessee	434
4	Kentucky	405
5	South Carolina	287
6	Missouri	224
7	Vanderbilt	101

== Personnel ==
=== Coaching staff ===
Name	Position	Consecutive season
Will Muschamp	Head coach (first seven games)	5th
Mike Bobo	Offensive coordinator and quarterbacks coach, interim head coach (final three games)	1st
Travaris Robinson	Defensive coordinator and defensive backs coach	5th
Tracy Rocker	Defensive line coach	1st
Bobby Bentley	Tight ends coach	5th
Joe Cox	Wide receivers coach	1st
Eric Wolford	Offensive line coach	4th
Connor Shaw	Director of Player Development and quarterbacks coach (final three games)	1st
Rod Wilson	Linebackers coach	1st
Mike Peterson	Outside linebackers coach	4th
Desmond Kitchings	Running backs coach	1st
Kyle Krantz	Special teams coordinator and assistant defensive backs coach	3rd
Paul Jackson	Director of Football Strength and Conditioning	1st
Drew Hughes	Director of Player Personnel	1st

=== Roster ===
2020 South Carolina Gamecocks Football Roster

Quarterback

- 3 Ryan Hilinski – sophomore (6'3, 225)
- 4 Luke Doty – freshman (6'1, 210)
- 10 Jay Urich – (redshirt) junior (6'5, 215)
- 15 Collin Hill – graduate (6'4, 222)
- 18 Connor Jordan – (redshirt) freshman (6'3, 205)

Running back

- 1 MarShawn Lloyd - Freshman (5'9, 210)
- 11 Zaquandre White – junior (6'1, 200)
- 14 Deshaun Fenwick – (redshirt) sophomore (6'1, 220)
- 20 Kevin Harris – sophomore (5'10, 225)
- 22 Bruce Staley – freshman (5'9, 200)
- 25 Rashad Amos – freshman (6'2, 215)
- 33 Slade Carroll – (redshirt) senior (5'9, 205)

Fullback

- 32 Bradley Dunn – freshman (5'9, 222)
- 46 Adam Prentice – graduate (6'0, 245)
- 48 Sean McGonigal – (redshirt) junior (6'1, 240)

Wide receiver

- 5 Dakereon Joyner – (redshirt) sophomore (6'1, 202)
- 6 Josh Vann – junior (5'10, 190)
- 8 Randrecous Davis – (redshirt) senior (5'10, 190)
- 13 Shi Smith – senior (5'10, 190)
- 16 Trey Adkins – (redshirt) sophomore (5'11, 178)
- 17 Xavier Legette – sophomore (6'0, 210)
- 18 OrTre Smith – (redshirt) junior (6'4, 222)
- 19 Ben Rollins – freshman (5'8, 160)
- 26 Elisha Brooks – (redshirt) freshman (6'0, 185)
- 27 Payton Mangrum – freshman (6'0, 188)
- 28 Deon Eaddy – freshman (6'2, 190)
- 29 Brandon Edwards – freshman (6'0, 200)
- 81 Jalen Brooks – junior (6'3, 190)
- 84 Rico Powers – freshman (6'2, 195)
- 86 Chad Terrell – (redshirt) sophomore (6'3, 215)
- 87 Mike Wyman – freshman (6'2, 200)
- 89 Ger-Cari Caldwell – freshman (6'5, 205)

Placekicker

- 43 Parker White – (redshirt) senior (6'5, 195)
- 45 Alex Herrera – freshman (5'9, 182)
- 47 Cole Hanna – (redshirt) senior (5'7, 180)
- 98 Mitch Jeter – freshman (5'10, 190)

Punter

- 36 Christian Kinsley – (redshirt) senior (6'2, 220)
- 39 Kai Kroeger – freshman (6'3, 195)

Tight end

- 9 Nick Muse – (redshirt) senior (6'4, 250)
- 12 Traveon Kenion – (redshirt) freshman (6'3, 240)
- 23 Jaheim Bell – freshman (6'2, 230)
- 35 Eric Shaw – freshman (6'4, 220)
- 80 Keveon Mullins – (redshirt) freshman (6'1, 245)
- 82 KeShawn Toney – (redshirt) freshman (6'2, 248)
- 83 Patrick Reedy – (redshirt) sophomore (6'7, 265)
- 88 Will Register – (redshirt) junior (6'4, 245)
- 90 Jessie Sanders – freshman (6'3, 235)
- 91 Dawson Coleman – freshman (6'5, 215)

Offensive Lineman

- 50 Sadarius Hutcherson – (redshirt) senior (6'4, 320)
- 52 Jaylen Nichols – sophomore (6'5, 315)
- 54 Jovaughn Gwyn – (redshirt) sophomore (6'2, 295)
- 55 Jakai Moore – (redshirt) freshman (6'5, 305)
- 57 Will Rogers – (redshirt) freshman (6'3, 305)
- 58 Mark Fox – (redshirt) freshman (6'4, 297)
- 62 Tyshon Wannamaker – freshman (6'3, 335)
- 65 Chuck Strickland – freshman (6'1, 254)
- 66 Dylan Seabuck – freshman (6'4, 310)
- 67 Gavin Bennett – (redshirt) freshman (6'3, 290)
- 68 Wyatt Campbell – (redshirt) sophomore (6'6, 305)
- 70 Hank Manos – (redshirt) sophomore (6'4, 305)
- 71 Eric Douglas – (redshirt) junior (6'4, 315)
- 72 Trai Jones – freshman (6'2, 300)
- 73 James Reedy – freshman (6'4, 315)
- 74 Vincent Murphy – (redshirt) freshman (6'2, 300)
- 75 Jazton Turnetine – junior (6'7, 330)
- 76 Jordan Rhodes – (redshirt) junior (6'4, 325)
- 77 Vershon Lee Freshman (6'3, 313)
- 79 Dylan Wonnum – junior (6'5, 310)

Defensive Lineman

- 5 Keir Thomas – (redshirt) senior (6'2, 275)
- 6 Zacch Pickens – sophomore (6'3, 300)
- 15 Aaron Sterling – senior (6'1, 245)
- 31 Chandler Farrell – (redshirt) senior (6'3, 278)
- 52 Kingsley Enagbare – junior (6'4, 270)
- 90 Rick Sandidge – junior (6'5, 295)
- 92 Tyreek Johnson – (redshirt) sophomore (6'3, 265)
- 93 Joseph Anderson – (redshirt) freshman (6'3, 275)
- 94 M.J. Webb – (redshirt) junior (6'3, 295)
- 95 Alex Huntley – freshman (6'4, 295)
- 96 Makius Scott – freshman (6'4, 305)
- 97 Devontae Davis – (redshirt) junior (6'3, 290)
- 99 Jabari Ellis – (redshirt) senior (6'3, 285)

BUCK

- 3 Jordan Burch – freshman (6'6, 275)
- 16 Rodricus Fitten – (redshirt) freshman (6'1, 255)
- 19 Brad Johnson – (redshirt) junior (6'2, 235)
- 55 Gilber Edmond – freshman (6'5, 230)
- 91 Tonka Hemingway – freshman (6'3, 265)

Linebacker

- 8 Jahmar Brown – sophomore (6'1, 215)
- 30 Damani Staley – senior (6'0, 235)
- 32 Mohamed Kaba – freshman (6'2, 227)
- 41 Darryle Ware – freshman (6'1, 225)
- 42 Rosendo Louis Jr. – (redshirt) sophomore (6'2, 245)
- 44 Sherrod Greene – senior (6'1, 230)
- 45 Spencer Eason-Riddle – (redshirt) senior (6'0, 225)
- 46 Noah Vincent – (redshirt) sophomore (6'1, 210)
- 53 Ernest Jones – junior (6'2, 230)

Defensive back

- 1 Jaycee Horn – junior (6'1, 205)
- 4 Jaylin Dickerson – (redshirt) junior (6'1, 195)
- 7 Jammie Robinson – sophomore (5'11, 195)
- 9 Cam Smith – (redshirt) freshman (6'0, 185)
- 10 R.J. Roderick – junior (6'0, 205)
- 11 Dominick Hill – freshman (6'0, 195)
- 14 Joey Hunter – freshman (6'0, 200)
- 21 Shilo Sanders – (redshirt) freshman (6'0, 195)
- 22 John Dixon – sophomore (6'0, 185)
- 23 Fabian Goodman – freshman (5'10, 170)
- 24 Israel Mukuamu – junior (6'4, 205)
- 25 O'Donnell Fortune – freshman (6'1, 175)
- 26 Landon Grier – freshman (5'9, 175)
- 27 Jaylan Foster – (redshirt) senior (5'10, 190)
- 28 Darius Rush – (redshirt) sophomore (6'2, 190)
- 31 McKay Melnick – freshman (5'9, 185)

Long snappers

- 59 Matthew Bailey – (redshirt) freshman (6'1, 200)

Defensive Specialists

- 49 Matthew Bailey – freshman (6'1, 198)
- 78 Hunter Rogers – freshman (6'1, 185)

- : 2020 South Carolina Gamecocks Football Roster 09/22/20

=== Depth chart ===
Defense

FS
Jamie Robinson
Jaylin Dickerson

WLB	MLB	SLB
Sherrod Greene	Ernest Jones	Brad Johnson
⋅	Damani Staley	Spencer Eason-Riddle

SS
R.J. Roderick
Shilo Sanders

CB
Jaycee Horn
John Dixon

DE	DT	DT	DE
Kingsley Enagbare	Keir Thomas	Jabari Ellis	Aaron Sterling
Jordan Burch	Zacch Pickens	Rick Sandidge	Tonka Hemingway

CB
Israel Mukuamu
Cam Smith

Offense

WR
Shi Smith
Luke Doty

LT	LG	C	RG	RT
Dylan Wonnum	Sadarius Hutcherson	Eric Douglas	Jovaughn Gwyn	Jaylen Nichols
Jazston Turntine	Jordan Rhodes	Vincent Murphy	Wyatt Campbell	Vershon Lee

TE
Nick Muse
Will Register

WR
Xavier Leggette
Rico Powers

QB
Collin Hill
Ryan Hilinski

RB
Kevin Harris
Deshaun Fenwick

FB
Adam Prentice
⋅

Special teams
PK Parker White
P Kai Kroeger
KR Shi Smith
PR Shi Smith
LS Matthew Bailey

== Schedule ==
South Carolina had games scheduled against Clemson, Coastal Carolina, East Carolina, and Wofford, which were all canceled due to the COVID-19 pandemic. This was the first season since 1908 that the Gamecocks did not play Clemson.

Date	Time	Opponent	Site	TV	Result	Attendance
September 26	7:30 p.m.	No. 16 Tennessee	Williams–Brice Stadium; Columbia, SC (rivalry)	SECN	L 27–31 ‡	15,009
October 3	12:00 p.m.	at No. 3 Florida	Ben Hill Griffin Stadium; Gainesville, FL	ESPN	L 24–38	15,120
October 10	12:00 p.m.	at Vanderbilt	Vanderbilt Stadium; Nashville, TN	SECN	W 41–7	1,288
October 17	12:00 p.m.	No. 15 Auburn	Williams–Brice Stadium; Columbia, SC	ESPN	W 30–22	15,766
October 24	7:00 p.m.	at LSU	Tiger Stadium; Baton Rouge, LA	ESPN	L 24–52	21,855
November 7	7:00 p.m.	No. 7 Texas A&M	Williams–Brice Stadium; Columbia, SC	ESPN	L 3–48	16,253
November 14	7:30 p.m.	at Ole Miss	Vaught–Hemingway Stadium; Oxford, MS	SECN	L 42–59	13,596
November 21	7:30 p.m.	Missouri	Williams–Brice Stadium; Columbia, SC (Mayor's Cup)	SECN Alt.	L 10–17	13,603
November 28	7:30 p.m.	No. 9 Georgia	Williams–Brice Stadium; Columbia, SC (rivalry)	SECN	L 16–45	16,444
December 5	7:30 p.m.	at Kentucky	Kroger Field; Lexington, KY	SECN	L 18–41	12,000
Rankings from AP Poll and CFP Rankings (after November 24) released prior to game; All times are in Eastern time

‡ As part of their penalty for NCAA violations, Tennessee has retroactively vacated its 2020 victory over South Carolina. However, the penalty to vacate victories does not result in a loss (or forfeiture) of the affected game or award a victory to the opponent, therefore South Carolina still considers the game a loss in their official records.

== Game summaries ==
=== Tennessee ===
Tennessee Volunteers (0–0) at South Carolina Gamecocks (0–0)

Quarter	1	2	3	4	Total
No. 16 Volunteers	7	7	10	7	31
Gamecocks	7	0	14	6	27

at Williams–Brice Stadium • Columbia, SC

- Date: September 26, 2020
- Game time: 7:30 p.m.
- Game weather: Temperature: 70 °F (21 °C) • Wind:NNW 3 mph (4.8 km/h) • Weather: Cloudy
- Game attendance: 15,009
- Referee: Ken Williamson
- TV announcers (SECN): Taylor Zarzour (play-by-play), Matt Stinchcomb (color) and Alyssa Lang (sidelines)

Game information

First Quarter

- (09:59) SC – Harris 3 yard run, White kick (SC 7–0)
- (03:07) UT – Guarantano 1 yard run, Cimaglia kick (7–7)

Second Quarter

- (13:22) UT – To'oTo'o 32 yard interception, Cimaglia kick (UT 14–7)

Third Quarter

- (12:28) UT – Gray 12 yard run, Cimaglia kick (UT 21–7)
- (10:27) SC – Smith 29 yard pass from Hill, White kick (UT 21–14)
- (04:32) SC – Hill 1 yard run, White kick (21–21)
- (02:18) UT – Cimaglia 27 yard field goal (UT 24–21)

Fourth Quarter

- (10:48) SC – White 35 yard field goal (24–24)
- (09:35) UT – Palmer 32 yard pass from Guarantano, Cimaglia kick (UT 31–24)
- (03:16) SC – White 45 yard field goal (UT 31–27)

Statistics	TENN	SC
First downs	21	22
Total yards	394	379
Rushes/yards	33–133	35–89
Passing yards	261	290
Passing: Comp–Att–Int	20–32–0	25–39–1
Time of possession	25:10	34:50

Team	Category	Player	Statistics
Tennessee	Passing	Jarrett Guarantano	19–31, 259 yards, 1 TD
Tennessee	Rushing	Ty Chandler	13 rushes, 86 yards, 0 TD
Tennessee	Receiving	Josh Palmer	6 catches, 85 yards, 1 TD
South Carolina	Passing	Collin Hill	25–39, 290 yards, 1 TD, 1 INT
South Carolina	Rushing	Kevin Harris	13 rushes, 55 yards, 1 TD
South Carolina	Receiving	Shi Smith	10 catches, 140 yards, 1 TD

=== At Florida ===
South Carolina Gamecocks (0–1) at No. 3 Florida Gators (1–0)

Quarter	1	2	3	4	Total
Gamecocks	7	7	3	7	24
No. 3 Gators	14	10	14	0	38

at Ben Hill Griffin Stadium • Gainesville, FL

- Date: October 3, 2020
- Game time: 12:00 p.m.
- Game weather: Temperature: 76 °F (24 °C) • Wind:N 9 mph (14 km/h) • Weather: Partly Cloudy
- Game attendance: 15,120
- Referee: Lee Hedrick
- TV announcers (ESPN): Mark Jones, Dusty Dvoracek, and Marty Smith

Game information

First Quarter

- (08:04) SC – Harris 2 yard run, White kick (SC 7–0)
- (03:45) UF – Pierce 2 yard run, McPherson kick (7–7)
- (00:06) UF – Pitts 13 yard pass from Trask, McPherson kick (UF 14–7)

Second Quarter

- (09:31) SC – Smith 4 yard pass from Hill, White kick (14–14)
- (08:04) UF – McPherson 26 yard field goal (UF 17–14)
- (01:22) UF – Pitts 4 yard pass from Trask, McPherson kick (UF 24–14)

Third Quarter

- (07:47) UF – Whittemore 4 yard pass from Trask, McPherson kick (UF 31–14)
- (04:44) UF – Toney 57 yard pass from Trask, McPherson kick (UF 38–14)
- (00:28) SC – White 45 yard field goal (UF 38–17)

Fourth Quarter

- (10:21) SC – Harris 9 yard pass from Hill, White kick (UF 38–24)

Statistics	SC	FLA
First downs	25	18
Total yards	329	348
Rushes/yards	36–117	24–80
Passing yards	212	268
Passing: Comp–Att–Int	28–47–0	21–29–1
Time of possession	36:23	23:37

Team	Category	Player	Statistics
South Carolina	Passing	Collin Hill	28–47, 212 yards, 2 TD
South Carolina	Rushing	Kevin Harris	22 rushes, 100 yards, 1 TD
South Carolina	Receiving	Shi Smith	12 catches, 85 yards, 1 TD
Florida	Passing	Kyle Trask	21–29, 268 yards, 4 TD, 1 INT
Florida	Rushing	Dameon Pierce	9 rushes, 51 yards, 1 TD
Florida	Receiving	Kadarius Toney	6 catches, 86 yards, 1 TD

=== At Vanderbilt ===
South Carolina Gamecocks (0–2) at Vanderbilt Commodores (0–2)

Quarter	1	2	3	4	Total
Gamecocks	3	7	17	14	41
Commodores	0	0	7	0	7

at Vanderbilt Stadium • Nashville, TN

- Date: October 10, 2020
- Game time: 12:00 p.m.
- Game weather: Temperature: 76 °F (24 °C) • Wind:N 9 mph (14 km/h) • Weather: Partly Cloudy
- Game attendance: 1,288
- Referee: Alex Moore
- TV: SECN

Game information

First Quarter

- (05:19) SC – White 42 yard field goal (SC 3–0)

Second Quarter

- (02:09) SC – Hill 1 yard run, White kick (SC 10–0)

Third Quarter

- (13:00) SC – Harris 25 yard run, White kick (SC 17–0)
- (09:01) VU – Johnson 22 yard pass from Seals, Cooke kick (SC 17–7)
- (04:22) SC – Hill 10 yard run, White kick (SC 24–7)
- (00:21) SC – White 40 yard field goal (SC 27–7)

Fourth Quarter

- (13:07) SC – Harris 88 yard run, White kick (SC 34–7)
- (10:21) SC – Joyner 47 yard run, White kick (SC 41–7)

Statistics	SC	VAN
First downs	18	15
Total yards	485	249
Rushes/yards	39–289	33–76
Passing yards	196	173
Passing: Comp–Att–Int	16–24–0	18–27–1
Time of possession	31:27	28:33

Team	Category	Player	Statistics
South Carolina	Passing	Collin Hill	16–24, 196 yards, 0 TD
South Carolina	Rushing	Kevin Harris	21 rushes, 177 yards, 2 TD
South Carolina	Receiving	Nick Muse	5 catches, 85 yards, 0 TD
Vanderbilt	Passing	Ken Seals	17–24, 148 yards, 1 TD
Vanderbilt	Rushing	Keyon Henry–Brooks	13 rushes, 75 yards, 0 TD
Vanderbilt	Receiving	Amir Abdur–Rahman	2 catches, 46 yards, 0 TD

=== Auburn ===
Auburn Tigers (2–1) at South Carolina Gamecocks (1-2)

Quarter	1	2	3	4	Total
No. 15 Tigers	9	7	3	3	22
Gamecocks	0	14	13	3	30

at Williams–Brice Stadium • Columbia, SC

- Date: October 17, 2020
- Game time: 12:00 p.m.
- Game weather: • Temperature: 62 °F (17 °C) • Wind:NE 10 mph (16 km/h) • Weather: Sunny
- Game attendance: 15,766
- Referee: Steve Marlowe
- TV announcers (ESPN): Dave Pasch (play-by-play), Greg McElroy (analyst), Holly Rowe (sideline reporter)

Game information

First Quarter

- (08:32) AU – Carlson 35 yard field goal (AU 3–0)
- (04:33) AU – Stove 11 yard pass from Nix, Carlson kick (AU 9–0)

Second Quarter

- (12:49) SC – Harris 3 yard run, White kick (AU 9–7)
- (10:24) AU – Bigsby 4 yard run, Carlson kick (AU 16–7)
- (00:35) SC – Hill 1 yard run, White kick (AU 16–14)

Third Quarter

- (10:22) AU – Carlson 38 yard field goal (AU 19–14)
- (06:31) SC – Smith 19 yard pass from Hill, White kick (SC 20–19)
- (00:54) SC – Harris 8 yard run, White kick (SC 27–19)

Fourth Quarter

- (09:13) SC – White 39 yard field goal (SC 30–19)
- (06:39) AU – Carlson 22 yard field goal (SC 30–22)

Statistics	AU	SC
First downs	27	20
Total yards	481	297
Rushes/yards	36–289	43–183
Passing yards	272	144
Passing: Comp–Att–Int	24–47–3	15–24–1
Time of possession	28:43	31:17

Team	Category	Player	Statistics
Auburn	Passing	Bo Nix	24–47, 272 yards, 1 TD, 3 INT
Auburn	Rushing	Tank Bigsby	16 rushes, 111 yards, 1 TD
Auburn	Receiving	Seth Williams	4 catches, 74 yards, 0 TD
South Carolina	Passing	Collin Hill	15–24, 144 yards, 1 TD, 1 INT
South Carolina	Rushing	Kevin Harris	25 rushes, 185 yards, 2 TD
South Carolina	Receiving	Shi Smith	8 catches, 76 yards, 1 TD

=== At LSU ===
South Carolina Gamecocks (2-2) at LSU Tigers (1-2)

Quarter	1	2	3	4	Total
Gamecocks	7	3	7	7	24
Tigers	10	21	14	7	52

at Tiger Stadium • Baton Rouge, LA

- Date: October 24, 2020
- Game time: 7:30pm
- Game attendance: 21,855
- TV: ESPN

Game information

First Quarter

- (7:34) LSU - Finley 1 yard run, York kick (LSU 7-0)
- (6:40) SC - Harris 45 yard run, White kick (7-7)
- (2:05) LSU- York 27 yard field goal (LSU 10-7)

Second Quarter

- (11:14) LSU - Marshall 7 yard pass from Finley, York kick (LSU 17-7)
- (5:22) SC - White 45 yard field goal (LSU 17-10)
- (3:43) LSU - Marshall 51 yard pass from Finley, York kick (LSU 24-10)
- (2:43) LSU - Ricks 45 yard interception return, York kick (LSU 31-10)

Third Quarter

- (11:17) SC - Harris 1 yard run, White kick (LSU 31-17)
- (11:00) LSU - Palmer 93 yard kickoff return, York kick (LSU 38-17)
- (4:12) LSU - Davis-Price 4 yard run, York kick (LSU 45-17)

Fourth Quarter

- (9:44) LSU - Emery Jr. 3 yard run, York kick (LSU 52-17)
- (7:39) SC - Vann 5 yard pass from Hill, White kick (LSU 52-24)

Statistics	SC	LSU
First downs	17	29
Total yards	403	541
Rushes/yards	29-169	54-276
Passing yards	234	265
Passing: Comp–Att–Int	12-22-1	17–21–1
Time of possession	22:26	37:34

Team	Category	Player	Statistics
South Carolina	Passing	Collin Hill	12–22, 234 yards, 1 TD, 1 INT
South Carolina	Rushing	Kevin Harris	12 carries, 126 yards, 2 TD
South Carolina	Receiving	Keveon Mullins	2 receptions, 101 yards
LSU	Passing	T. J. Finley	17–21, 265 yards, 2 TD, 1 INT
LSU	Rushing	Tyrion Davis-Price	22 carries, 135 yards, 1 TD
LSU	Receiving	Terrace Marshall Jr.	6 receptions, 88 yards, 2 TD

=== Texas A&M ===
Texas A&M Aggies (4–1) at South Carolina Gamecocks (2–3)

Quarter	1	2	3	4	Total
No. 7 Aggies	7	14	13	14	48
Gamecocks	0	0	0	3	3

at Williams–Brice Stadium • Columbia, SC

- Date: November 7, 2020
- Game time: 7:00 p.m. EDT
- Game attendance: 16,253
- TV: ESPN

Game information

First Quarter

- (4:04) TAMU - Smith 3 yard pass from Mond (Small kick) (TAMU 7-0)

Second Quarter

- (9:05) TAMU - Wydermeyer 15 yard pass from Mond (Small kick) (TAMU 14-0)
- (0:14) TAMU - Wydermeyer 7 yard pass from Mond (Small kick) (TAMU 21-0)

Third Quarter

- (11:04) TAMU - Mond 15 yard run (Small PAT failed) (TAMU 27-0)
- (6:55) TAMU - Achane 52 yard pass from Mond (Small kick) (TAMU 34-0)

Fourth Quarter

- (12:01) TAMU - Achane 3 yard run (Small kick) (TAMU 41-0)
- (5:55) SC - White 48 yard field goal (TAMU 41-3)
- (1:02) TAMU - Wright 42 yard pass from King (Small kick) (TAMU 48-3)

Statistics	TA&M	SC
First downs	26	9
Total yards	530	150
Rushes/yards	45/264	25/50
Passing yards	266	100
Passing: Comp–Att–Int	17-27-0	12–28–2
Time of possession	38:21	21:39

Team	Category	Player	Statistics
Texas A&M	Passing	Kellen Mond	16–26, 224 yards, 4 TD
Texas A&M	Rushing	Isaiah Spiller	18 carries, 131 yards
Texas A&M	Receiving	De’Von Achane	2 receptions, 70 yards, 1 TD
South Carolina	Passing	Collin Hill	8-21, 66 yards, 2 INT
South Carolina	Rushing	Kevin Harris	13 carries, 39 yards
South Carolina	Receiving	Shi Smith	7 receptions, 64 yards

=== At Ole Miss ===
South Carolina Gamecocks (2–4) at Ole Miss Rebels (2–4)

Quarter	1	2	3	4	Total
Gamecocks	7	14	14	7	42
Rebels	14	10	14	21	59

at Vaught–Hemingway Stadium • Oxford, MS

- Date: November 14, 2020
- Game time: 7:30 p.m. EDT
- Game weather: Clear • Temperature: 68 °F (20 °C)
- Game attendance: 13,596
- Referee: David Smith
- TV announcers (SECN): Tom Hart (play-by-play), Jordan Rodgers (color) and Cole Cubelic (sideline)

Game information

First Quarter

- (9:24) SC – Shi Smith 11 yard pass from Collin Hill, Parker White kick South Carolina 7–0; 10 plays, 75 yards, 5:36
- (4:45) MISS – Dontario Drummond 3 yard pass from Matt Corral, Luke Logan kick Tied 7–7; 14 plays, 57 yards, 4:32
- (0:47) MISS – Matt Corral 3 yard rush, Luke Logan kick Ole Miss 14–7; 8 plays, 63 yards, 3:20

Second Quarter

- (14:18) SC – Kevin Harris 46 yard rush, Parker White kick Tied 14–14; 4 plays, 75 yards, 1:29
- (9:38) MISS – Jerrion Ealy 15 yard pass from Matt Corral, Luke Logan kick Ole Miss 21–14; 11 plays, 57 yards, 4:40
- (3:36) SC – Kevin Harris 1 yard rush, Parker White kick Tied 21–21; 10 plays, 79 yards, 5:54
- (0:01) MISS – Luke Logan 22 yard kick Ole Miss 24–21; 5 plays, 57 yards, 0:44

Third Quarter

- (10:34) MISS – Snoop Conner 2 yard rush, Luke Logan kick Ole Miss 31–21; 12 plays, 75 yards, 4:26
- (5:39) SC – Kevin Harris 1 yard rush, Parker White kick Ole Miss 31–28; 10 plays, 75 yards, 4:50
- (2:59) SC – Kevin Harris 44 yard rush, Parker White kick South Carolina 35–31; 2 plays, 76 yards, 0:55
- (1:11) MISS – Jerrion Ealy 12 yard rush, Luke Logan kick Ole Miss 38–35; 4 plays, 75 yards, 1:48

Fourth Quarter

- (12:50) SC – Kevin Harris 12 yard rush, Parker White kick South Carolina 42–38; 7 plays, 75 yards, 3:21
- (12:02) MISS – Elijah Moore 91 yard pass from Matt Corral, Luke Logan kick Ole Miss 45–42; 2 plays, 94 yards, 0:45
- (6:09) MISS – Jerrion Ealy 5 yard rush, Luke Logan kick Ole Miss 52–42; 8 plays, 80 yards, 3:08
- (3:40) MISS – Elijah Moore 25 yard pass from Matt Corral, Casey Griffith kick Ole Miss 59–42; 4 plays, 24 yards, 1:40

Statistics	SC	MS
First downs	27	31
Total yards	548	708
Rushes/yards	39/318	48/195
Passing yards	230	513
Passing: Comp–Att–Int	17-29-1	28-32-0
Time of possession	29:19	30:41

Team	Category	Player	Statistics
South Carolina	Passing	Collin Hill	17–28, 230 yards, 1 TD, 1 INT
South Carolina	Rushing	Kevin Harris	25 carries, 243 yards, 5 TD
South Carolina	Receiving	Shi Smith	10 receptions, 117 yards, 1 TD
Ole Miss	Passing	Matt Corral	28–32, 513 yards, 4 TD
Ole Miss	Rushing	Jerrion Ealy	17 carries, 84 yards, 2 TD
Ole Miss	Receiving	Elijah Moore	13 receptions, 225 yards, 2 TD

=== Missouri ===
Missouri Tigers (2–3) at South Carolina Gamecocks (2–5)

Quarter	1	2	3	4	Total
Tigers	7	10	0	0	17
Gamecocks	0	0	3	7	10

at Williams–Brice Stadium • Columbia, SC

- Date: November 21, 2020
- Game time: 7:30 p.m. EDT
- Game weather: • Temperature:
- Game attendance: 13,603
- TV: SECN Alt.

Game information

First Quarter

Second Quarter

Third Quarter

Fourth Quarter

Statistics	MIZ	SC
First downs	19	18
Total yards	301	283
Rushes/yards	34/98	36/114
Passing yards	203	169
Passing: Comp–Att–Int	21-33-1	20–33–1
Time of possession	28:34	31:26

Team	Category	Player	Statistics
Missouri	Passing	Connor Bazelak	21–33, 203 yards, 1 TD, 1 INT
Missouri	Rushing	Larry Rountree III	21 carries, 58 yards, 1 TD
Missouri	Receiving	Keke Chism	6 receptions, 57 yards
South Carolina	Passing	Luke Doty	14–23, 130 yards, 1 INT
South Carolina	Rushing	Luke Doty	11 carries, 59 yards
South Carolina	Receiving	Nick Muse	6 receptions, 67 yards

=== No. 9 Georgia ===
No. 9 Georgia Bulldogs (5–2) at South Carolina Gamecocks (2–6)

Quarter	1	2	3	4	Total
No. 9 Bulldogs	21	7	10	7	45
Gamecocks	0	10	0	6	16

at Williams–Brice Stadium • Columbia, SC

- Date: November 28, 2020
- Game time: 7:30 p.m. EDT
- Game weather: • Temperature:
- Game attendance: 16,444

Game information

First Quarter

Second Quarter

Third Quarter

Fourth Quarter

Statistics	UGA	SC
First downs	24	16
Total yards	471	273
Rushes/yards	46/332	43/83
Passing yards	139	190
Passing: Comp–Att–Int	10-16-1	18-22-1
Time of possession	31:09	28:51

Team	Category	Player	Statistics
Georgia	Passing	JT Daniels	10–16, 139 yards, 2 TD, 1 INT
Georgia	Rushing	James Cook	6 carries, 104 yards, 2 TD
Georgia	Receiving	Tre' McKitty	2 receptions, 46 yards, 1 TD
South Carolina	Passing	Luke Doty	18–22, 190 yards, 1 TD, 1 INT
South Carolina	Rushing	Kevin Harris	17 carries, 53 yards, 1 TD
South Carolina	Receiving	Nick Muse	8 receptions, 131 yards, 1 TD

=== At Kentucky ===
South Carolina Gamecocks (2–7) at Kentucky Wildcats (3–6)

Quarter	1	2	3	4	Total
Gamecocks	3	0	7	8	18
Wildcats	10	17	7	7	41

at Kroger Field • Lexington, KY

- Date: December 5, 2020
- Game time: 7:30 p.m. EDT
- Game weather: Clear • Temperature: 35 °F (2 °C) • Wind: 4 NW mph
- Game attendance: 12,000
- Referee: Marc Curles
- TV: SECN

Game information

First Quarter

- (5:41) UK – Matt Ruffolo 22-yard field goal (Drive: 12 plays, 75 yards, 5:20; Kentucky 3–0)
- (4:19) UK – Chris Rodriguez Jr. 1-yard run, Matt Ruffolo kick (Drive: 2 plays, 26 yards, 0:28; Kentucky 10–0)
- (1:45) SC – Parker White 47-yard field goal (Drive: 6 plays, 10 yards, 2:25; Kentucky 10–3)

Second Quarter

- (10:30) UK – Asim Rose Jr. 8-yard run, Matt Ruffolo kick (Drive: 5 plays, 81 yards, 2:01; Kentucky 17–3)
- (1:14) UK – Chris Rodriguez Jr. 2-yard run, Matt Ruffolo kick (Drive: 7 plays, 39 yards, 3:26; Kentucky 24–3)
- (0:00) UK – Matt Ruffolo 41-yard field goal (Drive: 4 plays, 10 yards, 0:42; Kentucky 27–3)

Third Quarter

- (7:28) UK – Terry Wilson 1-yard run, Matt Ruffolo kick (Drive: 13 plays, 75 yards, 7:32; Kentucky 34–3)
- (5:21) SC – Kevin Harris 15-yard run, Parker White kick (Drive: 7 plays, 86 yards, 2:03; Kentucky 34–10)

Fourth Quarter

- (5:12) SC – Dakereon Joyner 30-yard pass from Luke Doty, Luke Doty pass to Nick Muse for two-point conversion (Drive: 9 plays, 90 yards, 3:27; Kentucky 34–18)
- (4:56) UK – Chris Rodriguez Jr. 79-yard run, Matt Ruffolo kick (Drive: 1 play, 79 yards, 0:12; Kentucky 41–18)

Statistics	SC	UK
First downs	21	24
Total yards	404	492
Rushes/yards	44/297	45/291
Passing yards	107	201
Passing: Comp–Att–Int	12-27-1	17–26–0
Time of possession	25:49	34:11

Team	Category	Player	Statistics
South Carolina	Passing	Luke Doty	11–25, 85 yards, 1 TD, 1 INT
South Carolina	Rushing	Kevin Harris	21 carries, 210 yards, 1 TD
South Carolina	Receiving	Dakereon Joyner	4 receptions, 43 yards, 1 TD
Kentucky	Passing	Terry Wilson	17–26, 201 yards
Kentucky	Rushing	Chris Rodriguez Jr.	14 carries, 139 yards, 3 TD
Kentucky	Receiving	Justin Rigg	3 receptions, 72 yards

== Rankings ==
Ranking movements Legend: — = Not ranked RV = Received votes
	Week															
Poll	Pre	1	2	3	4	5	6	7	8	9	10	11	12	13	14	Final
AP	—															
Coaches	—		RV													
CFP	Not released															Not released

== Players drafted into the NFL ==
Round	Pick	Player	Position	NFL Club
1	8	Jaycee Horn	CB	Carolina Panthers
3	103	Ernest Jones	ILB	Los Angeles Rams
6	204	Shi Smith	WR	Carolina Panthers
6	227	Israel Mukuamu	CB	Dallas Cowboys
