= George P. Hoffman House =

Historic house in South Carolina, United States

- U.S. National Register of Historic Places
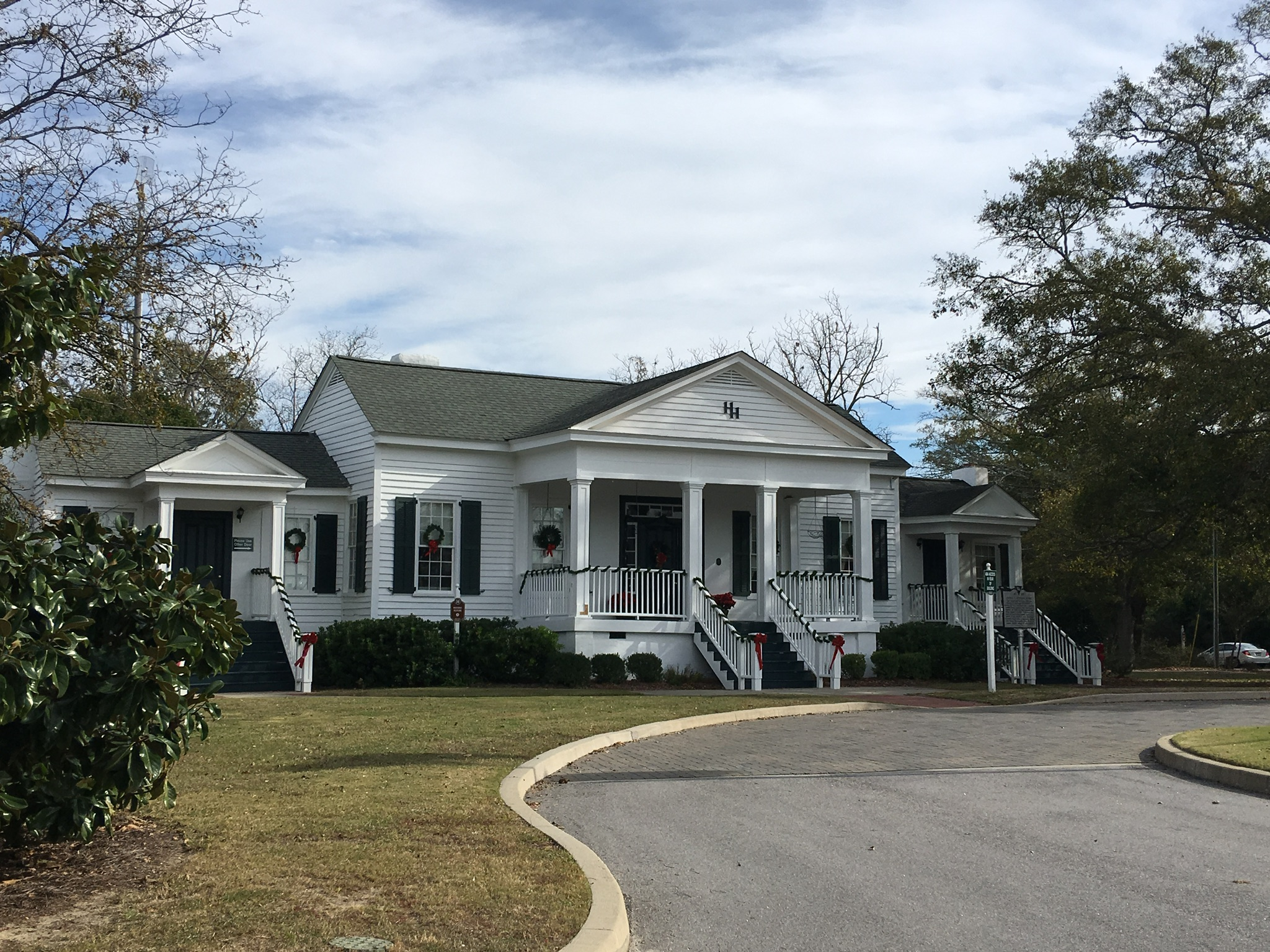

- Location within South Carolina Location within the United States
- Location: N of CR 54, Blythewood, South Carolina
- Coordinates: 34°12′53″N 80°58′19″W
- Area: less than one acre
- Built: c. 1855
- Architectural style: Greek Revival
- NRHP reference No.: 86000586
- Added to NRHP: March 27, 1986

George P. Hoffman House is a historic home located at Blythewood, Richland County, South Carolina. It was built about 1855, and is a one-story, braced-frame Greek Revival style residence. The house consists of a central, five-bay block, flanked by three-bay wings. It features a pedimented porch that spans the three central bays of the façade. Today it serves as the Town Hall for Blythewood. It was added to the National Register of Historic Places in 1986.
