= Amaré Barno =

American football player (born 1999)

Profile
- Position: Linebacker

Personal information
- Born: April 26, 1999 (age 27); Blythewood, South Carolina, U.S.
- Listed height: 6 ft 6 in (1.98 m)
- Listed weight: 245 lb (111 kg)

Career information
- High school: Westwood (Blythewood)
- College: Butler CC (2017–2018); Virginia Tech (2019–2021)
- NFL draft: 2022: 6th round, 189th overall pick

Career history
- Carolina Panthers (2022–2024); Columbus Aviators (2026)*
- * Offseason or practice squad member only

Career NFL statistics
- Total tackles: 37
- Sacks: 3.0
- Stats at Pro Football Reference

Amaré Barno (born April 26, 1999) is an American professional football linebacker. He played college football at Butler (KS) before transferring to Virginia Tech. Barno was drafted by the Panthers in the sixth round of the 2022 NFL draft.

== Early life ==
Barno grew up in Blythewood, South Carolina and attended Westwood High School. He played the safety position in high school. Barno failed to qualify academically to play Division I football and enrolled at Butler Community College.

== College career ==
Barno began his college career at Butler Community College, where coaches moved him from safety to linebacker. As a sophomore, he recorded 66 tackles, 14 tackles for loss and 4.5 sacks. In 2018, Barno committed to transfer to Virginia Tech for his remaining eligibility.

Barno played in three games in his first season at Virginia Tech in 2019 as an outside linebacker before redshirting the rest of the season. Going into his redshirt junior season, he was again moved to a different position and played defensive end. Barno finished the season a team-high 6.5 sacks and led the Atlantic Coast Conference with 16 tackles for loss. Barno recorded 5.5 tackles for loss with 3.5 sacks in 2021. Following the end of the season, Barno declared that he would be entering the 2022 NFL draft, and ran a 4.37 40-yard dash at the NFL Combine, faster than any linebacker or defensive lineman that year.

== Professional career ==
Pre-draft measurables
Height	Weight	Arm length	Hand span	Wingspan	40-yard dash	10-yard split	20-yard split	20-yard shuttle	Vertical jump	Broad jump	Bench press
6 ft 4 5/8 in (1.95 m)	246 lb (112 kg)	34 in (0.86 m)	9 in (0.23 m)	6 ft 8 5/8 in (2.05 m)	4.36 s	1.54 s	2.50 s	4.45 s	37.0 in (0.94 m)	10 ft 11 in (3.33 m)	18 reps
All values from NFL Combine/Pro Day

=== Carolina Panthers ===
At the 2022 NFL Combine, Barno tied Odafe Oweh for the fastest 40-yard dash time by a defensive lineman at 4.36; Oweh had recorded that time at the NFL Combine the year prior. Barno was drafted by the Carolina Panthers in the sixth round (189th overall) in the 2022 NFL Draft. He finished his rookie season with nine tackles and two sacks in nine games played. In the 2023 season, he finished with 21 total tackles in 15 games and one start.

Barno began the 2024 season on the reserve/physically unable to perform list. He was activated on November 30. He was waived on July 25, 2025.

=== Columbus Aviators ===
On January 14, 2026, Barno was selected by the Columbus Aviators of the United Football League (UFL).
