= Blythewood, South Carolina =

- Town
- Location in Richland County and the state of South Carolina.
- Coordinates: 34°13′45″N 81°00′10″W
- Country: United States
- State: South Carolina
- Counties: Richland, Fairfield

Government
  - Type: Mayor–council government

Area
  - Total: 10.71 sq mi (27.74 km^{2})
  - Land: 10.63 sq mi (27.53 km^{2})
  - Water: 0.085 sq mi (0.22 km^{2})
- Elevation: 525 ft (160 m)

Population (2020)
  - Total: 4,772
  - Density: 449.0/sq mi (173.35/km^{2})
- Time zone: UTC-5 (EST)
  - Summer (DST): UTC-4 (EDT)
- ZIP code: 29016
- Area codes: 803, 839
- FIPS code: 45-07255
- GNIS feature ID: 2405291
- Website: www.townofblythewoodsc.gov

Blythewood is a town in Richland and Fairfield counties, South Carolina, United States; and a suburb of Columbia. As of the 2020 United States census, the population of the town was 4,772.

== History ==
Blythewood was originally named "Doko", a Native American term for a watering place. The town was named after Doko Depot, which was a stop along the railroad that ran between Charlotte and Columbia. In 1865, this railroad was destroyed by General Sherman. The town was rebuilt, and changed its name to Blythewood in 1877, after a local school called The Blythewood Female Institute. The school was later renamed "Blythewood Academy".

The George P. Hoffman House, built in 1855, is the oldest extant house in Blythewood and is used as the city hall. It was added to the National Register of Historic Places in 1986.

== Geography ==
Blythewood is located in the Piedmont region of South Carolina.

According to the United States Census Bureau, the town has a total area of 9.8 square miles (25.3 km^{2}), of which 9.7 square miles (25.1 km^{2}) is land and 0.077 square miles (0.2 km^{2}), or 0.79%. is water.

=== Climate ===
Climate is characterized by warm temperatures and moderate precipitation throughout the year. The Köppen Climate Classification subtype for this climate is "Cfa" (Humid Subtropical Climate).

Climate data for Blythewood
Month	Jan	Feb	Mar	Apr	May	Jun	Jul	Aug	Sep	Oct	Nov	Dec	Year
Mean daily maximum °C (°F)	12 (54)	14 (58)	19 (66)	24 (75)	28 (82)	31 (88)	33 (91)	32 (89)	29 (84)	24 (75)	19 (66)	14 (57)	23 (74)
Mean daily minimum °C (°F)	0 (32)	2 (35)	6 (42)	10 (50)	15 (59)	19 (66)	21 (70)	21 (69)	17 (63)	11 (52)	6 (43)	2 (35)	11 (51)
Average precipitation mm (inches)	110 (4.2)	94 (3.7)	120 (4.6)	79 (3.1)	84 (3.3)	120 (4.6)	130 (5.2)	110 (4.5)	94 (3.7)	81 (3.2)	74 (2.9)	86 (3.4)	1,180 (46.4)
Average precipitation days	10	9	9	8	8	9	10	9	8	6	7	9	103
Source: Weatherbase

== Demographics ==
Historical population
Census	Pop.	Note	%±
1980	92		—
1990	164		78.3%
2000	170		3.7%
2010	2,034		1,096.5%
2020	4,772		134.6%
2025 (est.)	7,233	▲	51.6%
U.S. Decennial Census

Blythewood is part of the Columbia, South Carolina, Metropolitan Statistical Area.

=== Racial and ethnic composition ===
Blythewood, South Carolina – Racial and ethnic composition Note: the US Census treats Hispanic/Latino as an ethnic category. This table excludes Latinos from the racial categories and assigns them to a separate category. Hispanics/Latinos may be of any race.
Race / Ethnicity (NH = Non-Hispanic)	Pop 2000	Pop 2010	Pop 2020	% 2000	% 2010	2020
White alone (NH)	135	1,383	2,333	79.41%	67.99%	48.89%
Black or African American alone (NH)	31	540	1,851	18.24%	26.55%	38.79%
Native American or Alaska Native alone (NH)	0	8	13	0.00%	0.39%	0.27%
Asian alone (NH)	0	20	115	0.00%	0.98%	2.41%
Native Hawaiian or Pacific Islander alone (NH)	0	1	6	0.00%	0.05%	0.13%
Other race alone (NH)	0	2	29	0.00%	0.10%	0.61%
Mixed race or Multiracial (NH)	0	23	201	0.00%	1.13%	4.21%
Hispanic or Latino (any race)	4	57	224	2.35%	2.80%	4.69%
Total	170	2,034	4,772	100.00%	100.00%	100.00%

=== 2020 census ===
As of the 2020 census, Blythewood had a population of 4,772. The median age was 40.9 years. 25.5% of residents were under the age of 18 and 14.1% of residents were 65 years of age or older. For every 100 females there were 93.0 males, and for every 100 females age 18 and over there were 89.6 males age 18 and over.

88.3% of residents lived in urban areas, while 11.7% lived in rural areas.

There were 1,661 households in Blythewood, of which 42.1% had children under the age of 18 living in them. There were also 920 families residing in the town. Of all households, 69.0% were married-couple households, 8.9% were households with a male householder and no spouse or partner present, and 19.0% were households with a female householder and no spouse or partner present. About 12.3% of all households were made up of individuals and 3.7% had someone living alone who was 65 years of age or older.

There were 1,760 housing units, of which 5.6% were vacant. The homeowner vacancy rate was 2.6% and the rental vacancy rate was 9.6%.

=== 2010 census ===
As of the census of 2010, there were 3,148 people, 996 households residing in the town. The population density was 209.7 inhabitants per square mile (81.0/km^{2}). The average median age was 39.3 The racial makeup of the town was 55% White, 41% African American, and 1.0% Asian. Hispanic or Latino of any race were 3.0% of the population.

There were 723 households, out of which 42.5% had children under the age of 18 living with them, 71.0% were headed by married couples living together, 9.4% had a female householder with no husband present, and 15.9% were non-families. 13.4% of all households were made up of individuals, and 4.6% were someone living alone who was 65 years of age or older. The average household size was 2.81 and the average family size was 3.08.

In the town, the population was spread out, with 28% below the age of 19, 15% from 20 to 29, 8% 30-39, 16% 40-49, 18% 50-59 and 15% who were 60 years of age or older. The median age was 39.3 years. 49% male and 51% female.

=== Income and poverty ===
The estimated median annual income for a household in the town was $90,444. The per capita income for the town was $38,077. About 1.4% of the population were below the poverty line, including 0.0% of those under the age of 18.

== Economy ==
The US Headquarters for Spirax-Sarco Engineering is headquartered in Blythewood.

A $2 billion Scout Motors electric vehicle plant is planned. The Volkswagen subsidiary plans to build a 1,100-acre site that will employ 4,000 people and produce 200,000 vehicles annually by the end of 2026.

== Education ==
Blythewood has a public library, a branch of the Richland County Library.

The schools in Richland County School District Two located directly in Blythewood are as follows:

- Blythewood High School
- Westwood High School
- Blythewood Middle School
- Muller Road Middle School
- Bethel-Hanberry Elementary School
- Round Top Elementary School
- Langford Elementary School
- Kelly Mill Middle School

== Infrastructure ==
=== Roads ===
Blythewood Road is one of the main thoroughfares, intersecting Interstate 77 at Exit 27.

U.S. Route 21 also goes through Blythewood, intersecting Interstate 77 at exit 24.

== Notable people ==
- Amaré Barno - outside linebacker for the Carolina Panthers
- Justin Bethel - former defensive back and special teams player for the Miami Dolphins
- Elizabeth Hawley Gasque - first woman from South Carolina elected to the United States Congress
- Alex Huntley - an American football defensive tackle for the Miami Dolphins
- Cam Smith - an American football cornerback for the Miami Dolphins
- Brandon Wilds - former NFL running back
- Grayson Greiner - former MLB catcher
