= Alex Huntley =

American football player (born 2001)

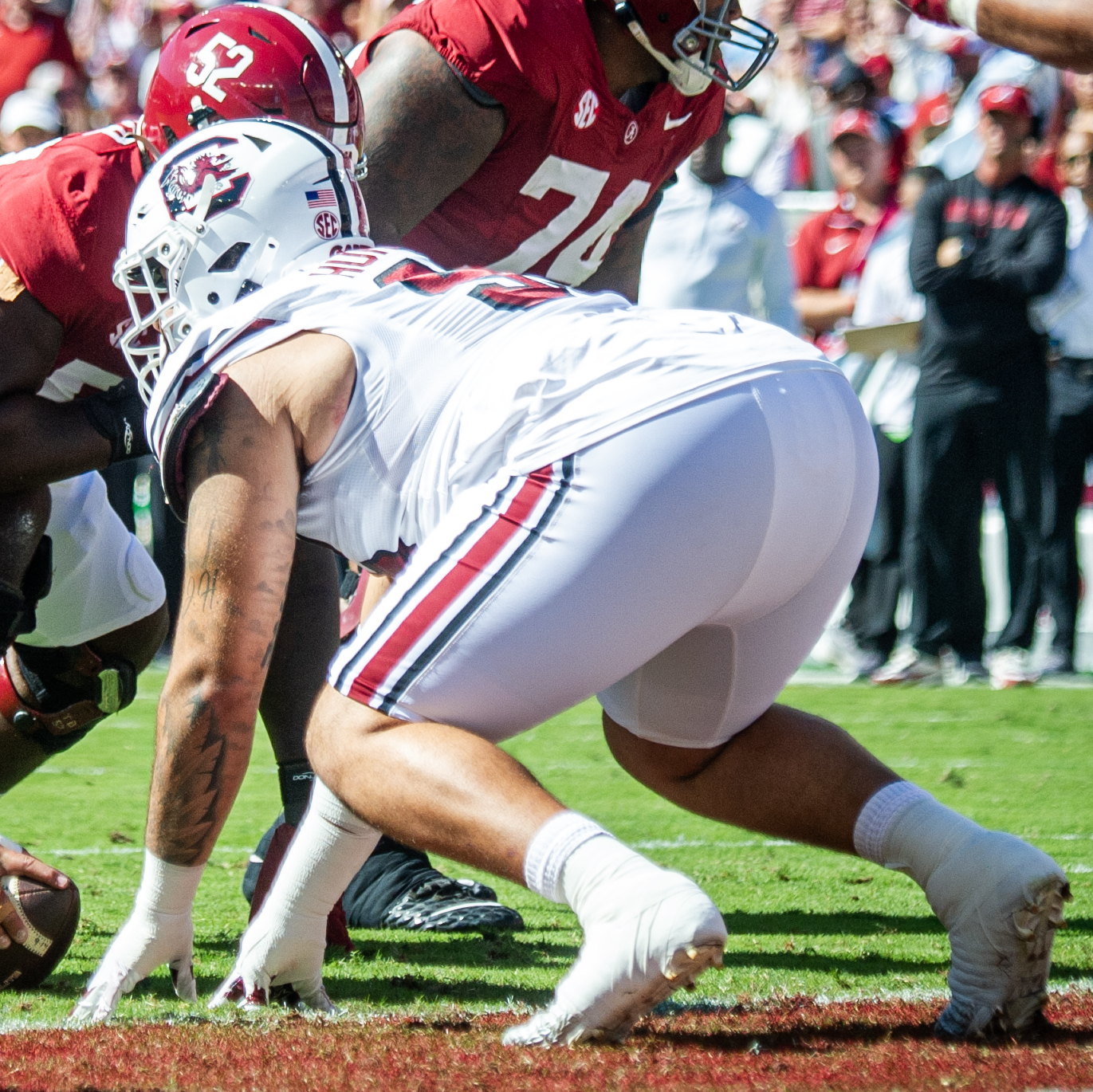
- Huntley with South Carolina in 2024

Profile
- Position: Defensive tackle

Personal information
- Born: October 8, 2001 (age 25); Blythewood, South Carolina, U.S.
- Listed height: 6 ft 4 in (1.93 m)
- Listed weight: 298 lb (135 kg)

Career information
- High school: Hammond School (Columbia, South Carolina)
- College: South Carolina (2020–2024)
- NFL draft: 2025: undrafted

Career history
- Miami Dolphins (2025)*
- * Offseason or practice squad member only
- Stats at Pro Football Reference

Alexander J. Huntley (born October 8, 2001) is an American professional football defensive tackle. He played college football for the South Carolina Gamecocks.

== Early life ==
Alexander Huntley was born on October 8, 2001, in Blythewood, South Carolina. He attended the private Hammond school, and played Skyhawk basketball, lacrosse, track & field, and football. In football, he played on both offense and defense on a team that won three straight South Carolina Independent School Association AAA titles. He also won state championships in shot put and lacrosse, and was elected the student body president. In his senior year, Hutley played in the Army All-American Bowl, and 247 sports ranked him as the 20th best defensive tackle in the country and the 4th best player in South Carolina, rating him as a four star prospect. After offers from multiple schools, Huntley accepted a scholarship to the University of South Carolina on February 5, 2020.

== College career ==
Huntley began studying and playing at the University of South Carolina in 2020. He red-shirted his first year, only playing in one game with only one recorded tackle.

== Professional career ==
Pre-draft measurables
Height	Weight	Arm length	Hand span	Wingspan	40-yard dash	10-yard split	20-yard split	20-yard shuttle	Three-cone drill	Vertical jump	Broad jump	Bench press
6 ft 3 in (1.91 m)	294 lb (133 kg)	33 in (0.84 m)	9 5/8 in (0.24 m)	6 ft 8 3/8 in (2.04 m)	5.12 s	1.70 s	2.93 s	4.81 s	7.78 s	27.5 in (0.70 m)	8 ft 9 in (2.67 m)	22 reps
All values from Pro Day

On April 26, 2025, Huntley was signed by the Miami Dolphins as an undrafted free agent to a 3-year contract worth $2.965 million. He was waived on August 26 as part of final roster cuts and re-signed to the practice squad the next day. Huntley signed a reserve/future contract with Miami on January 6, 2026. On August 29, Huntley was waived by the Dolphins.
