= Jordan Burch =

American football player (born 2001)

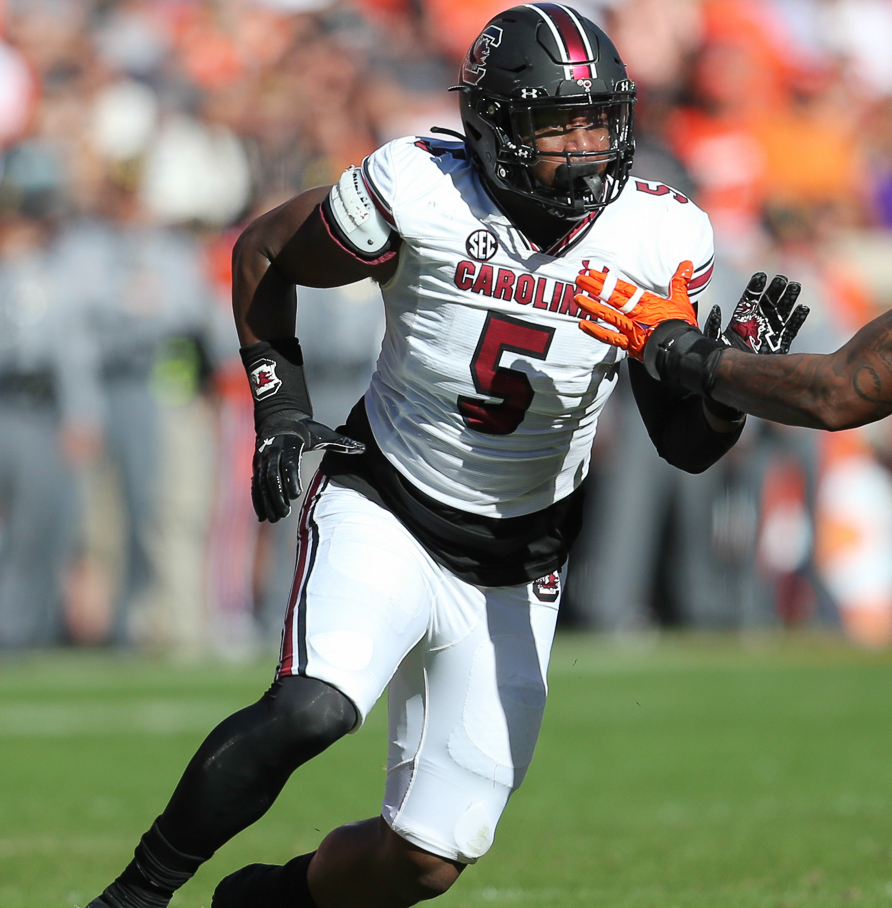
- Burch with the South Carolina Gamecocks in 2022

No. 52 – Arizona Cardinals
- Position: Outside linebacker
- Roster status: Injured reserve

Personal information
- Born: October 10, 2001 (age 25); Florence, South Carolina, U.S.
- Listed height: 6 ft 4 in (1.93 m)
- Listed weight: 280 lb (127 kg)

Career information
- High school: Hammond (Columbia, South Carolina)
- College: South Carolina (2020–2022); Oregon (2023–2024)
- NFL draft: 2025: 3rd round, 78th overall pick

Career history
- Arizona Cardinals (2025–present)

Awards and highlights
- Third-team All-Big Ten (2024)

Career NFL statistics as of Week 5, 2026
- Tackles: 33
- Sacks: 2.0
- Pass deflections: 3
- Stats at Pro Football Reference

Jordan Isaiah Askew-Burch (born October 10, 2001) is an American professional football outside linebacker for the Arizona Cardinals of the National Football League (NFL). He played college football for the South Carolina Gamecocks and Oregon Ducks. Burch was selected by the Cardinals in the third round of the 2025 NFL draft.

== Early life ==
Burch attended Wilson High School in Florence, South Carolina, as a freshman, before transferring to the Hammond School in Columbia, South Carolina for the remainder of his high school career. He was selected to the play in the 2020 Under Armour All-America Game, where he was selected as a captain. A five-star recruit, Burch committed to play college football at the University of South Carolina.

== College career ==
Burch played in eight games as a true freshman at South Carolina in 2020 and had 10 tackles. In 2021, he started one of 13 games, recording 26 tackles, one sack and one interception he returned 61 yards for a touchdown. In 2022, started all 13 games and finished with 60 tackles and 3.5 sacks. After the season, Burch entered the transfer portal and transferred to the University of Oregon.

== Professional career ==
Pre-draft measurables
Height	Weight	Arm length	Hand span	Wingspan	40-yard dash	10-yard split	20-yard split
6 ft 4 1/8 in (1.93 m)	279 lb (127 kg)	33 in (0.84 m)	9 1/2 in (0.24 m)	6 ft 7 3/8 in (2.02 m)	4.67 s	1.66 s	2.75 s
All values from NFL Combine

Burch was selected by the Arizona Cardinals in the third round, 78th overall, of the 2025 NFL draft.
