= Hammond School (South Carolina) =

Private school in Columbia, South Carolina, US

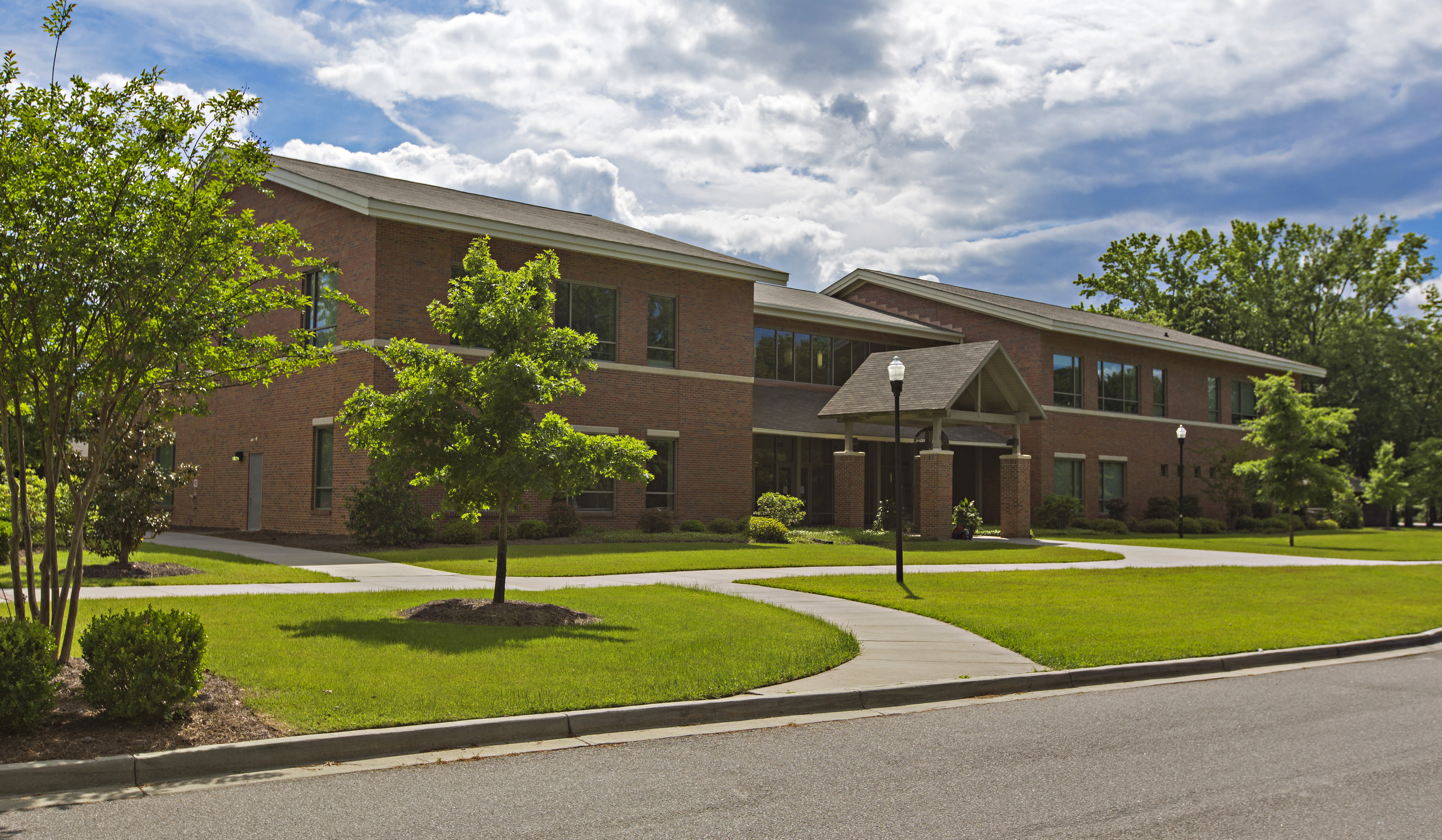

Location
- 854 Galway Lane; Columbia, South Carolina 29209; United States; 33°57′49″N 80°57′58″W

Information
- Type: Private school
- Established: 1966 (60 years ago)
- Head of school: Andrew M. North
- Grades: Pre-K–12
- Enrollment: 999
- Campus type: Non-residential
- Colors: Red and royal blue
- Mascot: Skyhawk
- Endowment: $1.93 million
- Website: www.hammondschool.org

Hammond School, originally James H. Hammond Academy, is a pre-K through 12 private school in Columbia, South Carolina, with 1008 total students as of 2025. The school was founded in 1966 as a segregation academy. Hammond School's leader is Andy North. It is accredited by the South Carolina Independent School Association (SCISA) and the National Association of Independent Schools (NAIS). The school's namesake, James Henry Hammond – a brutal slaveholder known for his sexual exploitation of enslaved women and of his four teenage nieces – has been a source of enduring controversy.

== History ==
We're far better off without Negroes.

— Hammond school administrator in 1976

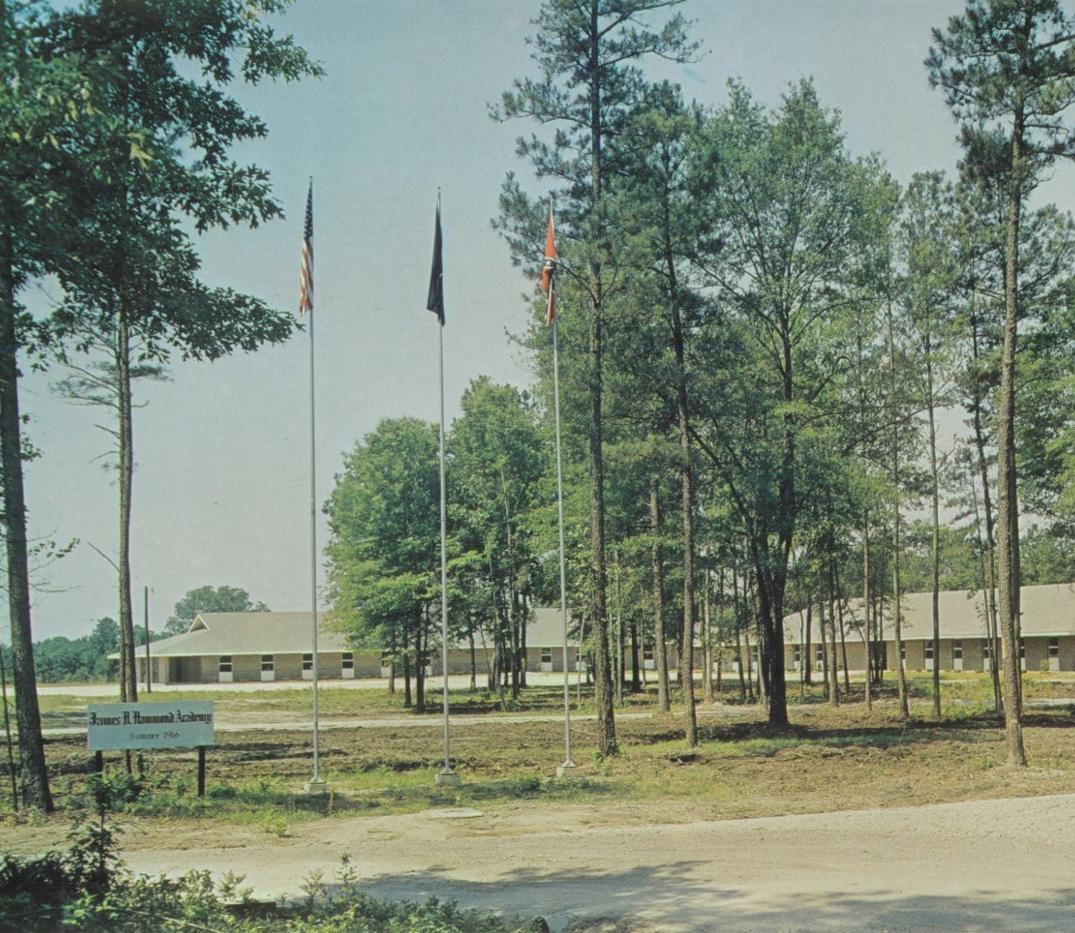
The Hammond School campus in 1966. Like many segregation academies, the school flew the Confederate flag.

The school was founded in 1966 as a segregation academy in response to the court ordered racial integration of public schools. It is named for James Henry Hammond, a particularly brutal and outspoken proponent of slavery. Like other segregation academies, Hammond Academy's name was chosen to buttress the lost cause myth in support of historical revisionism. Tom Turnipseed commented Hammond's "name was chosen because his grandson contributed significant money to the school's founding, and Confederate big-wigs were favored as names for white-flight private schools started as part of the backlash to impending racial desegregation of public schools."

The school's enrollment surged in 1968 when details of the public school desegregation busing plan were released. One parent told the Los Angeles Times that she enrolled her children at Hammond Academy because "integration had turned the public schools upside down"

In 1972, Hammond Academy's tax exemption was revoked by the IRS when it refused to document that it had a racially nondiscriminatory admissions policy. In 1976, a school administrator told John Egerton the school did not want the tax exemption because the school was "better off without negroes". The administrator further opined that "segregation is coming back to this country" because it is a "more natural condition."

The school initially eschewed extracurricular activities in order to emphasize education in "basic subjects".

The school quickly grew to 1,200 students, but in the 1980s enrollment dwindled so low that policy changes were required. In the 1980s, under headmaster Nick Hagerman, Hammond Academy moved away from its segregationist roots. The school stopped flying the Confederate flag in 1984 and began recruiting minority students with scholarships. By 1988, the Hammond School had regained its tax-exempt status. By the 1990s, the resulting admission of more than just a token number of minority students moved Hammond into what Jason Kreutner described as class-based segregation.

In 1989, the board of trustees voted to change the school's name to Hammond School. The school says the name change was "to adopt a global purpose". According to Tom Turnipseed, the name was changed in order to "moderate the shameful sensuality and radical racism of its namesake."

In 2020, although several alumni asked the school to discontinue the use of Hammond's name because of his history of incest, pedophilia and sexual abuse, the board of trustees retained the name. NBA player Alex English, who sent his children to Hammond, said they experienced racism at the school, including from other parents who ostracized white students for dating black classmates. English transferred some of his children out of Hammond.

== Demographics ==
For the 2018–2019 school year, the Hammond School's student body was 76.9% white and 23.1% minority races. The student/teacher ratio is 8:1. The grades are relatively evenly split with 31% of the student body in high school, 31% in middle school, and 38% in elementary school.

For the 2024-2025 school year, Hammond School's student body was made up of 1008 students and 158 faculty and staff. The student to teacher ratio was relatively low at 9:1. The gender break down of students is evenly split, with 51% male and 49% female.

Hammond School claims that 20% of students are minority races in 2025. The National Center for Education Statistics breaks down the number of students representing each race for the 2023-2024 school year based on 1,007 total students :

	American Indian/ Alaska Native	Asian	Black	Hispanic	White	Native Hawaiian/ Pacific Islander	Two or More Races
Number of Students	0	33	102	23	737	4	45
Percentage of Total	0%	3.28%	10.13%	2.28%	73.19%	0.40%	4.47%

Class of 2025 educational statistics:

- Average SAT score: 1214
- Average ACT score: 27.5
- Total AP courses taken: 69 students completed 396 AP and Post AP courses
- Total scholarships offered: Total college scholarships was in excess of $16 million, with $10.6 million for academic scholarships and $5.4 million in athletic scholarships

== Accreditation ==
Hammond School is accredited by the South Carolina Independent School Association, which was founded in 1965 to support segregation academies, as well as the Southern Association of Colleges and Schools.

== Athletics ==
Hammond school places an emphasis on athletics, with 93% of Middle and Upper school students participating in a team sport. As of 2023, the school has won 161 cumulative state championships. Cheerleading, football, and Lacrosse brought home state championships in 2023.

In 2024, the school won the SCISA class 3A football championship. Since 2024, the Hammond School has won 22 football championships, including 6 consecutive championships from 2006 to 2011 and 8 consecutive championships from 2014 to 2024.

The Skyhawks won the Cheerleading SCISA class 3A state championship in 2023, the team's 6th state championship.

The Skyhawks won the boys' basketball SCISA class 3A championship in 2015.

The Skyhawks won the girls' basketball SCISA class 3A championship in 2018, the 11th title but the first since 1993, the last of four consecutive championships.

The Skyhawks won the boys' baseball SCISA class 3A championship in 2021, the 6th title for the school. It was the second title under Coach Braciszewski, who joined the Skyhawks staff in 2016 and was named head coach in 2018.

In 2022, the Skyhawks claimed their sixth-straight SCISA Football championship, with a shut out against Laurence Manning, 52-0.

== Campus ==
The Hammond School is located in the Woodland Estates neighborhood in eastern Columbia, SC. The campus is 110 acres, including a 112 acres (45 ha) farm. The school has 19 buildings, 85 classrooms, four art studios, three music studios, two dining halls, two gymnasiums, a golf short course, nature cabin, Wonder Lab, Innovation Center, Tennis courts, and multiple fields. The farm has hosted equestrian competitions.

In 2017, the city of Columbia approved a plan to add 26,000 square feet (2,400 m^{2}) of buildings to the campus, including an enlarged gym and new classroom building. In 2019, the new classroom building titled "The Innovation Center" was completed. The building is 30,000 square feet and is designed to enable students to learn through hands on learning. The building features a 24 ft SciDome, a saltwater aquarium, and a STEM lab to promote creativity and student engagement.

== Notable alumni ==
- Jordan Burch – football player
- Kelsey Chow – actor
- Alex Huntley – football player
- Jody Lumpkin – basketball player and coach
- Jeff Scott – American football coach, former head coach at University of South Florida
- Seventh Woods – basketball player
- Charlie Todd – comedian
