= 2021 Citrus Bowl =

Postseason college football bowl game

2021 Vrbo Citrus Bowl
- 75th Citrus Bowl
Auburn Tigers	Northwestern Wildcats
(6–4)	(6–2)
SEC	Big Ten
19	35
Head coach: Kevin Steele (interim)	Head coach: Pat Fitzgerald
	AP / Coaches / CFP; 15 / 13 / 14
	1	2	3	4	Total
Auburn	0	6	7	6	19
Northwestern	14	0	7	14	35
- Date: January 1, 2021
- Season: 2020
- Stadium: Camping World Stadium
- Location: Orlando, Florida
- MVP: Peyton Ramsey (QB, Northwestern)
- Favorite: Northwestern by 3.5
- Referee: Jerry Magallanes (ACC)

United States TV coverage
- Network: ABC
- Announcers: Dave Flemming (play-by-play); Rod Gilmore (analyst); Paul Carcaterra (sideline)

The 2021 Citrus Bowl was a college football bowl game played on January 1, 2021, with kickoff at 1:00 p.m. EST on ABC. It was the 75th edition of the Citrus Bowl, and was one of the 2020–21 bowl games concluding the 2020 FBS football season. Sponsored by Vrbo, a vacation rental marketplace owned by the HomeAway division of Expedia, the game was officially known as the Vrbo Citrus Bowl.

== Teams ==
The game featured the Auburn Tigers of the Southeastern Conference (SEC) and the Northwestern Wildcats of the Big Ten Conference. This was the second meeting between the two programs, and first since the 2010 Outback Bowl, won by Auburn, 38–35.

=== Auburn Tigers ===
Auburn entered the game with a 6–4 record, unranked in the AP Poll. They finished in third place in the SEC's West Division. The Tigers faced four ranked teams during the season, losing to Georgia, Alabama, and Texas A&M while defeating Kentucky. Their only other loss was to South Carolina. Prior to the Citrus Bowl, Auburn fired head coach Gus Malzahn, who had led the program for eight seasons. Defensive coordinator Kevin Steele served as interim head coach for the Tigers.

=== Northwestern Wildcats ===
Northwestern entered the game with a 6–2 record, ranked 15th in the AP Poll. The Wildcats won the Big Ten's West Division, but fell to Ohio State in the Big Ten Championship Game, 22–10. Their only other loss was to Michigan State. Northwestern faced two ranked opponents, losing to Ohio State and defeating Wisconsin. The Wildcats were led by head coach Pat Fitzgerald, in his 15th season with the program.

== Game summary ==
2021 Vrbo Citrus Bowl

Quarter	1	2	3	4	Total
Auburn	0	6	7	6	19
No. 14 Northwestern	14	0	7	14	35

at Camping World Stadium • Orlando, Florida

- Date: Friday, January 1, 2021
- Game time: 1:00 p.m. EST
- Game weather: Partly sunny • Temperature: 83 °F (28 °C) • Wind: S 15 mph
- Referee: Jerry Magallanes (ACC)
- TV announcers (ABC): Dave Flemming (play-by-play), Rod Gilmore (analyst), and Paul Carcaterra (sideline)
- ESPN game summary

Game information

First quarter

- (11:32) NU – Ramaud Chiaokhiao-Bowman 35 yard pass from Peyton Ramsey, Charlie Kuhbander kick (Drive: 9 plays, 75 yards, 3:28; Northwestern 7–0)
- (3:14) NU – John Raine 6 yard pass from Peyton Ramsey, Charlie Kuhbander kick (Drive: 10 plays, 68 yards, 4:21; Northwestern 14–0)

Second quarter

- (6:03) AUB – Anders Carlson 50 yard field goal (Drive: 8 plays, 20 yards, 2:36; Northwestern 14–3)
- (0:17) AUB – Anders Carlson 27 yard field goal (Drive: 15 plays, 72 yards, 3:45; Northwestern 14–6)

Third quarter

- (8:32) AUB – Elijah Canion 57 yard pass from Bo Nix, Anders Carlson kick (Drive: 6 plays, 75 yards, 2:10; Northwestern 14–13)
- (1:34) NU – Peyton Ramsey 30 yard rush, Charlie Kuhbander kick (Drive: 9 plays, 87 yards, 2:10; Northwestern 21–13)

Fourth quarter

- (12:13) NU – Cam Porter 1 yard rush, Charlie Kuhbander kick (Drive: 7 plays, 50 yards, 2:16; Northwestern 28–13)
- (7:49) NU – Riley Lees 8 yard pass from Peyton Ramsey, Charlie Kuhbander kick (Drive: 6 plays, 24 yards, 3:35; Northwestern 35–13)
- (4:41) AUB – D.J. Williams 2 yard rush, 2-point pass failed (Drive: 10 plays, 75 yards, 3:08; Northwestern 35–19)

=== Statistics ===
Statistics	AUB	NU
First downs	18	25
Plays–yards	69–361	86–457
Rushes–yards	26–61	51–166
Passing yards	300	291
Passing: comp–att–int	26–43–0	24–35–0
Time of possession	24:18	33:47

Team	Category	Player	Statistics
Auburn	Passing	Bo Nix	25/42, 292 yards, 1 TD
Auburn	Rushing	Bo Nix	10 carries, 32 yards
Auburn	Receiving	Elijah Canion	3 receptions, 80 yards, 1 TD
Northwestern	Passing	Peyton Ramsey	24/35, 291 yards, 3 TD
Northwestern	Rushing	Cam Porter	33 carries, 98 yards, 1 TD
Northwestern	Receiving	John Raine	6 receptions, 76 yards, 1 TD

== See also ==
- 2020 Cure Bowl, played at the same venue six days earlier
- 2020 Cheez-It Bowl, played at the same venue three days earlier
