= 2021 Gator Bowl (January) =

Postseason college football bowl game

2021 TaxSlayer Gator Bowl
- 76th Gator Bowl
NC State Wolfpack	Kentucky Wildcats
(8–3)	(4–6)
ACC	SEC
21	23
Head coach: Dave Doeren	Head coach: Mark Stoops
AP / Coaches / CFP; 24 / 22 / 23
	1	2	3	4	Total
NC State	0	0	7	14	21
Kentucky	3	10	0	10	23
- Date: January 2, 2021
- Season: 2020
- Stadium: TIAA Bank Field
- Location: Jacksonville, Florida
- MVP: Asim Rose Jr. (RB, Kentucky) & Zonovan Knight (RB, NC State)
- Favorite: Kentucky by 3
- Referee: Reggie Smith (Big Ten)
- Attendance: 10,422

United States TV coverage
- Network: ESPN
- Announcers: Anish Shroff (play-by-play), Tom Luginbill (analyst) and Lericia Harris (sideline)

The 2021 Gator Bowl was a college football bowl game played on January 2, 2021, with kickoff at noon EST on ESPN. It was the 76th edition of the Gator Bowl, and was one of the 2020–21 bowl games concluding the 2020 FBS football season. Sponsored by financial technology company TaxSlayer, the game was officially known as the TaxSlayer Gator Bowl. Kentucky would go on to win the Taxslayer Gator Bowl against North Carolina State 23–21. This was Kentucky's third straight bowl victory following the 2019 Citrus Bowl and the 2019 Belk Bowl. The last time the Kentucky football program won three straight bowl games was 2006 to 2008, winning back-to-back Music City Bowls and Liberty Bowl.

== Teams ==
The bowl matchup was announced on December 20, featuring the NC State Wolfpack of the Atlantic Coast Conference (ACC) and the Kentucky Wildcats of the Southeastern Conference (SEC), consistent with the bowl's conference tie-ins. The teams had met twice previously—a win by NC State in 1909 and a win by Kentucky in 1970.

=== NC State Wolfpack ===
NC State entered the bowl with an 8–3 record (7–3 in ACC play), ranked 24th in the AP Poll and 23rd in CFP rankings. They also faced five ranked opponents during the season, defeating Pittsburgh and Liberty while falling to Virginia Tech, North Carolina, and Miami (FL). NC State had a 1–3 record in four prior Gator Bowls.

=== Kentucky Wildcats ===
Kentucky entered the bowl with a 4–6 record, all in SEC contests. They were one of a limited number of teams to enter a bowl game with a losing record. The Wildcats were ranked 23rd in the AP Poll in late September. They faced five ranked opponents during the season, defeating Tennessee while losing to Auburn, Georgia, Alabama, and Florida. Kentucky had appeared in one prior Gator Bowl, losing the December 2016 edition.

== Game summary ==
=== 1st quarter ===
Kentucky scored the first points of the bowl game with a twenty-five yard field goal at the 6:00 mark by Kicker Matt Ruffolo after a 9-minute, 68 yard drive. Kentucky had a 3–0 lead at quarter's end.

=== 2nd quarter ===
Kentucky's lead increased to 10–0 at the 6:23 mark via a four-yard touchdown run by Running Back Chris Rodriguez, Jr. Kentucky would again increase the lead to 13–0 at the end of the half with another field goal by Ruffolo for twenty-six yards.

=== 3rd quarter ===
At the 2:56 mark, North Carolina State finally scored its first points to make it 13–7 with a nine-yard touchdown pass to Receiver C.J. Riley from Quarterback Bailey Hockman.

=== 4th quarter ===
Kentucky increased its lead with Ruffolo's third field goal of the game for twenty-yards to make it 16–7 at the 5:45 mark. However, at the 4:46 mark NC State responded with a thirteen-yard touchdown run by Running Back Zonovan Knight to make it 16–14. Kentucky increased its lead again with Running Back Rodriguez, Jr.s' second rushing touchdown of the game for twenty-six yards, making the score 23–14 at the 2:55 mark. At the 1:10 mark, NC State responded again with a two-yard touchdown run by Running Back Jordan Houston to make the score 23–21. Since NC State had used its final timeout at the 1:01 mark, Kentucky was able to run out the clock to seal the victory, winning 23–21. Kentucky Running Back Asim Rose, Jr. was named the Gator Bowl MVP after rushing for 148 yards on only twelve carries, accounting for well more than half of Kentucky's 288 total rushing yards.

=== Scoring summary ===
2021 TaxSlayer Gator Bowl

Quarter	1	2	3	4	Total
No. 23 NC State	0	0	7	14	21
Kentucky	3	10	0	10	23

at TIAA Bank Field • Jacksonville, Florida

- Date: Saturday, January 2, 2021
- Game time: 12:00 p.m. EST
- Game weather: Cloudy • Temperature: 74 °F (23 °C) • Wind: SSW 13 mph
- Game attendance: 10,422
- Referee: Reggie Smith
- TV announcers (ESPN): Anish Shroff (play-by-play), Tom Luginbill (analyst) and Lericia Harris (sideline)
- ESPN game summary

Game information

First quarter

- (6:00) UK – Matt Ruffolo 25 yard field goal (Drive: 16 plays, 68 plays, 9:00; Kentucky 3–0)

Second quarter

- (6:23) UK – Chris Rodriguez 4 yard rush, Matt Ruffolo kick (Drive: 6 plays, 79 yards, 2:39; Kentucky 10–0)
- (0:02) UK – Matt Ruffolo 26 yard field goal (Drive: 7 plays, 69 yards, 1:21; Kentucky 13–0)

Third quarter

- (2:56) NCST – C.J. Riley 9 yard pass from Bailey Hockman, Christopher Dunn kick (Drive: 13 plays, 76 yards, 6:12; Kentucky 13–7)

Fourth quarter

- (5:45) UK – Matt Ruffolo 20 yard field goal (Drive: 7 plays, 40 yards, 3:09; Kentucky 16–7)
- (4:46) NCST – Zonovan Knight 13 yard rush, Christopher Dunn kick (Drive: 3 plays, 37 yards, 0:54; Kentucky 16–14)
- (2:55) UK – Chris Rodriguez 26 yard rush, Matt Ruffolo kick (Drive: 1 play, 26 yards, 0:07; Kentucky 23–14)
- (1:10) NCST – Jordan Houston 2 yard rush, Christopher Dunn kick (Drive: 7 plays, 65 yards, 1:41; Kentucky 23–21)

=== Statistics ===
Statistics	NCST	UK
First downs	19	19
Plays–yards	66–318	68–380
Rushes–yards	26–50	48–281
Passing yards	268	99
Passing: comp–att–int	27–40–3	12–20–0
Time of possession	25:53	34:07

Team	Category	Player	Statistics
NC State	Passing	Bailey Hockman	27/40, 268 yards, 1 TD, 3 INT
NC State	Rushing	Zonovan Knight	12 carries, 52 yards, 1 TD
NC State	Receiving	Thayer Thomas	3 receptions, 46 yards
Kentucky	Passing	Terry Wilson	12/20, 99 yards
Kentucky	Rushing	Asim Rose Jr.	12 carries, 148 yards
Kentucky	Receiving	Keaton Upshaw	2 receptions, 25 yards
