= 2020–21 NCAA football bowl games =

Series of college football bowl games following the 2020 season

- Season: 2020
- Regular season: September 3, 2020 – December 19, 2020
- Number of bowls: 26 (Note: Bowl count includes the National Championship game.)
- All-star games: 3
- Bowl games: December 21, 2020 – January 11, 2021 (Note: Dates exclude all-star games.)
- National Championship: 2021 College Football Playoff; National Championship
- Location of Championship: Hard Rock Stadium; Miami Gardens, Florida
- Champions: Alabama Crimson Tide
- Bowl Challenge Cup winner: Big 12
Bowl record by conference
Conference	Bowls	Record	Number of teams in final AP poll
SEC	9	7–2 (0.778)	4
AAC	6	1–5 (0.167)	1
ACC	6	0–6 (0.000)	4
Conference USA	6	0–6 (0.000)	0
Big 12	5	5–0 (1.000)	4
Sun Belt	5	4–1 (0.800)	2
Big Ten	5	3–2 (0.600)	4
Mountain West	3	2–1 (0.667)	1
Independents	3	2–1 (0.667)	2
MAC	2	2–0 (1.000)	2
Pac-12	2	0–2 (0.000)	1

The 2020–21 NCAA football bowl games were a series of post-season games scheduled to complete the 2020 NCAA Division I FBS football season. Team-competitive games began on December 21, 2020, and concluded with the 2021 College Football Playoff National Championship played on January 11, 2021. Three all-star games followed, concluding with the 2021 Hula Bowl, played on January 31, 2021.

The number of bowl games was lower than in recent seasons (25 team-competitive bowls aside from the National Championship Game, and three all-star games), as both the regular season and postseason were impacted by the COVID-19 pandemic. In mid-October 2020, the NCAA waived bowl eligibility requirements for the 2020–21 bowl season, intended "to allow as many student-athletes as possible the opportunity to participate in bowl games this year." This led to nine teams with losing records accepting bids to bowl games, surpassing the six teams with losing records who were deemed bowl eligible (rules not waived) in order to fill the 2016–17 NCAA football bowl games – consistent with the ongoing proliferation of what used to be a limited number of bowl games intended to reward the best teams in college football.

== Schedule ==
The schedule for the 2020–21 bowl games is below. All times are EST (UTC−5). Note that Division II bowls and Division III bowls are not included here.

On October 23, 2020, the Football Bowl Association announced a rebranding as "Bowl Season"; the organization works "with all existing bowls to promote the benefits of the entire bowl system." The organization's logo was visible on the field at some bowl games.

=== College Football Playoff and Championship Game ===
The College Football Playoff (CFP) system is used to determine a national championship of Division I FBS college football. A 13-member committee of experts ranked the top 25 teams in the nation after each of the final five weeks of the regular season. On August 5, 2020, CFP organizers announced that they would move the release of final rankings and semifinal matchups from December 6 to 20, in order to accommodate conferences that had delayed their championship games to mid-December. The top four teams in the final ranking were seeded in a single-elimination semifinal round, with the winners advancing to the National Championship game.

The semifinal games for the 2020–21 season were the Rose Bowl and the Sugar Bowl. Both were played on January 1, 2021, as part of a yearly rotation of three pairs of six bowls, commonly referred to as the New Year's Six bowl games. The Rose Bowl game was relocated to AT&T Stadium in Arlington, Texas, home of the Cotton Bowl Classic, after Governor Gavin Newsom's orders in response to the COVID-19 pandemic in California would have resulted in the game being played behind closed doors without fans. The semifinal winners advanced to the 2021 College Football Playoff National Championship at Hard Rock Stadium in Miami Gardens, Florida, played on January 11, 2021.

In the event of COVID-19 issues within the playoff teams, CFP organizers had identified contingency dates (which did not need to be used) of January 11 and January 12 for the semifinals and January 18 for the championship game.

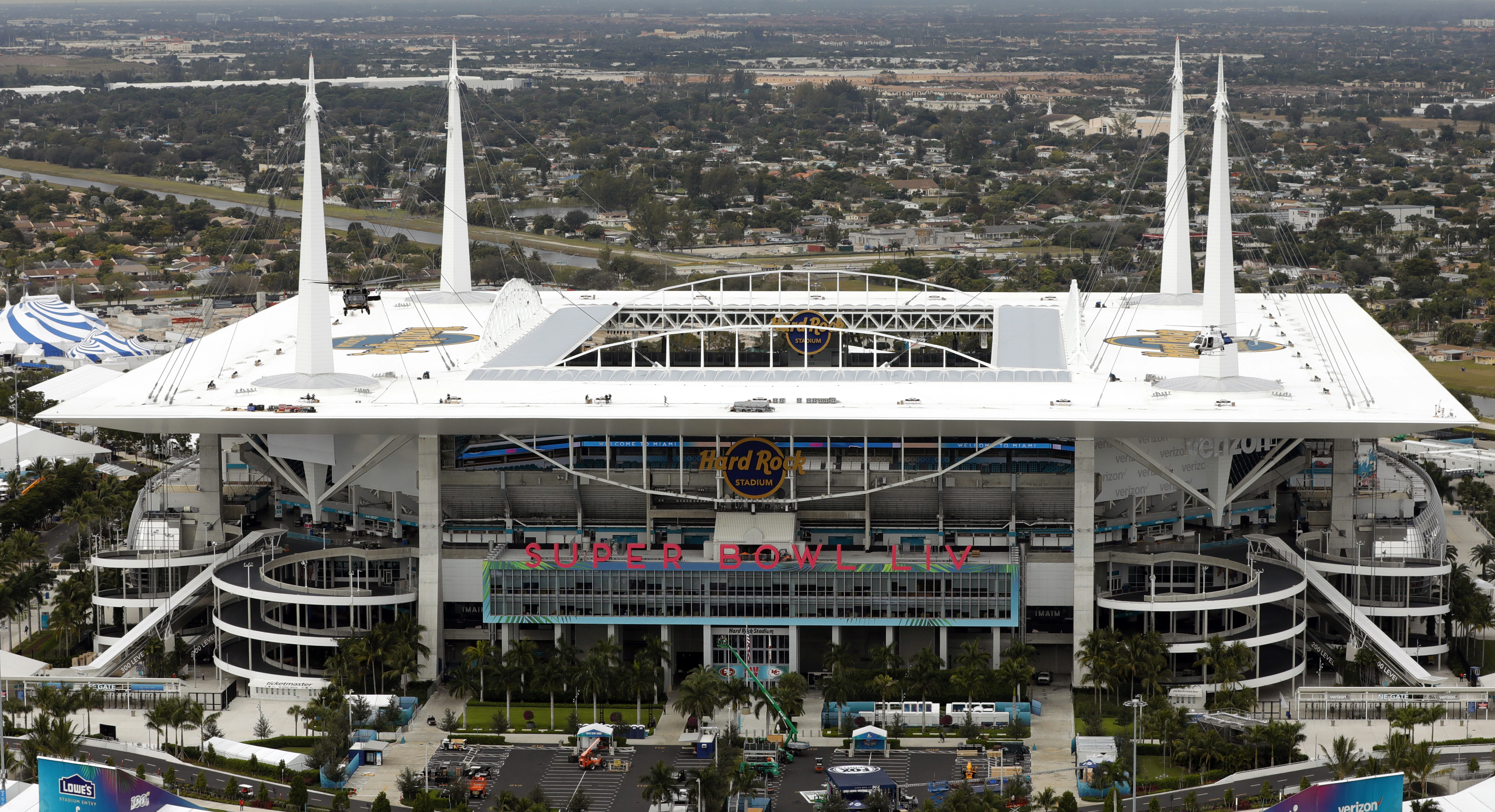
Hard Rock Stadium, site of the National Championship game

Semifinals
January 1 – Rose Bowl AT&T Stadium, Arlington (Note: The 2021 Rose Bowl was moved to AT&T Stadium in Arlington, Texas, due to the COVID-19 pandemic in California.)
1	Alabama	31
4	Notre Dame	14
January 1 – Sugar Bowl Mercedes-Benz Superdome, New Orleans
2	Clemson	28
3	Ohio State	49

Championship
January 11 – National Championship Hard Rock Stadium, Miami Gardens
1	Alabama	52
3	Ohio State	24

Each of the games in the following table was televised by ESPN.

Date	Time (EST)	Game	Site	Teams	Affiliations	Results
Dec. 30	8:00 p.m.	Cotton Bowl Classic	AT&T Stadium; Arlington, Texas	No. 6 Oklahoma Sooners (8–2); No. 7 Florida Gators (8–3)	Big 12; SEC	Oklahoma 55; Florida 20
Jan. 1	12:00 p.m.	Peach Bowl	Mercedes-Benz Stadium; Atlanta, Georgia	No. 9 Georgia Bulldogs (7–2); No. 8 Cincinnati Bearcats (9–0)	SEC; American	Georgia 24; Cincinnati 21
Jan. 1	4:00 p.m.	Rose Bowl (Playoff Semifinal Game)	AT&T Stadium; Arlington, Texas	No. 1 Alabama Crimson Tide (11–0); No. 4 Notre Dame Fighting Irish (10–1)	SEC; ACC	Alabama 31; Notre Dame 14
Jan. 1	8:00 p.m.	Sugar Bowl (Playoff Semifinal Game)	Mercedes-Benz Superdome; New Orleans, Louisiana	No. 3 Ohio State Buckeyes (6–0); No. 2 Clemson Tigers (10–1)	Big Ten; ACC	Ohio State 49; Clemson 28
Jan. 2	4:00 p.m.	Fiesta Bowl	State Farm Stadium; Glendale, Arizona	No. 10 Iowa State Cyclones (8–3); No. 25 Oregon Ducks (4–2)	Big 12; Pac-12	Iowa State 34; Oregon 17
Jan. 2	8:00 p.m.	Orange Bowl	Hard Rock Stadium; Miami Gardens, Florida	No. 5 Texas A&M Aggies (8–1); No. 13 North Carolina Tar Heels (8–3)	SEC; ACC	Texas A&M 41; North Carolina 27
Jan. 11	8:00 p.m.	College Football Playoff National Championship (Rose Bowl Winner vs. Sugar Bowl Winner)	Hard Rock Stadium; Miami Gardens, Florida	No. 1 Alabama Crimson Tide (12–0); No. 3 Ohio State Buckeyes (7–0)	SEC; Big Ten	Alabama 52; Ohio State 24

=== Non-CFP bowl games ===
Due to a sponsorship change, what had been the Camping World Bowl played in Florida was renamed the Cheez-It Bowl, and the former Cheez-It Bowl played in Arizona became the Guaranteed Rate Bowl. Also due to a sponsorship change, what had been the Belk Bowl was renamed as the Duke's Mayo Bowl. Due to the COVID-19 pandemic, the 2020 edition of the New Mexico Bowl was moved to Frisco, Texas.

==== New bowls ====
Three new bowls had planned to debut during the 2020–21 bowl season, although only one was actually played.

- The Fenway Bowl (Boston, Massachusetts) was postponed to the 2021–22 bowl season due to the pandemic.
- The LA Bowl (Inglewood, California) was initially scheduled for December 30, then postponed to the 2021–22 bowl season due to the pandemic.
- The Myrtle Beach Bowl (Conway, South Carolina) was played on December 21.

The Montgomery Bowl was announced as a "substitute of the Fenway Bowl for this season only".

==== Cancelled bowls ====
The following annual bowl games had their 2020 editions canceled (date announced):

- Redbox Bowl (July 31): Although the COVID-19 pandemic was cited as a justification, Levi's Stadium not renewing its agreement to host the game was an additional factor, making the overall future of the bowl unclear.
- Bahamas Bowl and Hawaii Bowl (October 2): Canceled due to travel restrictions related to the pandemic.
- Holiday Bowl (October 22): Organizers cited complications from the pandemic and the demolition of its former home venue, SDCCU Stadium.
- Quick Lane Bowl (October 30): No specific reason was given for the cancellation.
- Pinstripe Bowl (November 27): Canceled due to an increase in COVID-19 cases.
- Sun Bowl (December 1): Canceled due to an increase in COVID-19 cases.
- Las Vegas Bowl (December 2): Canceled due to COVID-19 complications. On December 3, it was announced that the game's new Pac-12 and SEC tie-ins would be transferred to the Armed Forces Bowl (although only an SEC tie-in would be fulfilled, with The American providing an opponent).
- Frisco Bowl (December 15): Canceled due to COVID-19 complications within the SMU program. As a result, UTSA accepted a bid to the First Responder Bowl.
- Independence Bowl, Birmingham Bowl and Guaranteed Rate Bowl (December 20): Canceled due to a lack of available teams to play.
- Military Bowl (December 21): Canceled due to a lack of available teams to play.
- Gasparilla Bowl (December 22): Cancelled after South Carolina dropped out due to COVID issues, leaving UAB with no opponent.
- Music City Bowl (December 27): Cancelled after Missouri dropped out due to COVID issues, leaving Iowa with no opponent.
- Texas Bowl (December 29): Cancelled after TCU dropped out due to COVID issues, leaving Arkansas with no opponent.

On December 14, the NCAA's Football Oversight Committee (FOC) announced that FBS teams would be allowed to schedule an additional game in the event of a bowl game cancellation. Such games would need to be requested not later than December 21, and played not later than December 31. A replacement game would need to be scheduled against an opponent from a conference with a tie-in to the canceled bowl game.

The cancellations, along with the move of the Cure Bowl from CBS Sports Network to ESPN due to its acquisition by ESPN Events, left the Arizona Bowl as the only bowl not televised by the ESPN family of networks. On December 10, it was announced that the Arizona Bowl would be shifted from CBS Sports Network to the main CBS network as a substitute for the Sun Bowl.

==== Bowls played ====
Date	Time (EST)	Game	Site	Television	Teams (Note: Win–loss records are prior to the bowl game being played.)	Affiliations (Note: Reflects actual conferences of participants, for specific teams that are listed. Else, reflects conference tie-ins, which are subject to change as bowl invitations are issued and accepted.)	Results
Dec. 21	2:30 p.m.	Myrtle Beach Bowl	Brooks Stadium; Conway, South Carolina	ESPN	Appalachian State Mountaineers (8–3); North Texas Mean Green (4–5)	Sun Belt; C–USA	Appalachian State 56; North Texas 28
Dec. 22	3:30 p.m.	Famous Idaho Potato Bowl	Albertsons Stadium; Boise, Idaho	ESPN	Nevada Wolf Pack (6–2); Tulane Green Wave (6–5)	MWC; American	Nevada 38; Tulane 27
Dec. 22	7:00 p.m.	Boca Raton Bowl	FAU Stadium; Boca Raton, Florida	ESPN	No. 16 BYU Cougars (10–1); UCF Knights (6–3)	Independent; American	BYU 49; UCF 23
Dec. 23	3:00 p.m.	New Orleans Bowl	Mercedes-Benz Superdome; New Orleans, Louisiana	ESPN	Georgia Southern Eagles (7–5); Louisiana Tech Bulldogs (5–4)	Sun Belt; C–USA	Georgia Southern 38; Louisiana Tech 3
Dec. 23	7:00 p.m.	Montgomery Bowl	Cramton Bowl; Montgomery, Alabama	ESPN	Memphis Tigers (7–3); Florida Atlantic Owls (5–3)	American; C–USA	Memphis 25; Florida Atlantic 10
Dec. 24	3:30 p.m.	New Mexico Bowl	Toyota Stadium; Frisco, Texas	ESPN	Hawaii Rainbow Warriors (4–4); Houston Cougars (3–4)	MWC; American	Hawaii 28; Houston 14
Dec. 25	2:30 p.m.	Camellia Bowl	Cramton Bowl; Montgomery, Alabama	ESPN	Buffalo Bulls (5–1); Marshall Thundering Herd (7–2)	MAC; C–USA	Buffalo 17; Marshall 10
Dec. 26	3:30 p.m.	First Responder Bowl	Gerald J. Ford Stadium; Dallas, Texas	ABC	No. 19 Louisiana Ragin' Cajuns (9–1); UTSA Roadrunners (7–4)	Sun Belt; C–USA	Louisiana 31; UTSA 24
Dec. 26	3:30 p.m.	LendingTree Bowl	Ladd–Peebles Stadium; Mobile, Alabama	ESPN	Georgia State Panthers (5–4); Western Kentucky Hilltoppers (5–6)	Sun Belt; C–USA	Georgia State 39; Western Kentucky 21
Dec. 26	7:30 p.m.	Cure Bowl	Camping World Stadium; Orlando, Florida	ESPN	Liberty Flames (9–1); No. 12 Coastal Carolina Chanticleers (11–0)	Independent; Sun Belt	Liberty 37; Coastal Carolina 34 (OT)
Dec. 29	5:30 p.m.	Cheez-It Bowl	Camping World Stadium; Orlando, Florida	ESPN	No. 21 Oklahoma State Cowboys (7–3); No. 18 Miami (FL) Hurricanes (8–2)	Big 12; ACC	Oklahoma State 37; Miami (FL) 34
Dec. 29	9:00 p.m.	Alamo Bowl	Alamodome; San Antonio, Texas	ESPN	No. 20 Texas Longhorns (6–3); Colorado Buffaloes (4–1)	Big 12; Pac-12	Texas 55; Colorado 23
Dec. 30	12:00 p.m.	Duke's Mayo Bowl	Bank of America Stadium; Charlotte, North Carolina	ESPN	Wisconsin Badgers (3–3); Wake Forest Demon Deacons (4–4)	Big Ten; ACC	Wisconsin 42; Wake Forest 28
Dec. 31	12:00 p.m.	Armed Forces Bowl	Amon G. Carter Stadium; Fort Worth, Texas	ESPN	Mississippi State Bulldogs (3–7); No. 24 Tulsa Golden Hurricane (6–2)	SEC; American	Mississippi State 28; Tulsa 26
Dec. 31	2:00 p.m.	Arizona Bowl	Arizona Stadium; Tucson, Arizona	CBS	Ball State Cardinals (6–1); No. 22 San Jose State Spartans (7–0)	MAC; MWC	Ball State 34; San Jose State 13
Dec. 31	4:00 p.m.	Liberty Bowl	Liberty Bowl Memorial Stadium; Memphis, Tennessee	ESPN	West Virginia Mountaineers (5–4); Army Black Knights (9–2)	Big 12; Independent	West Virginia 24; Army 21
Jan. 1	1:00 p.m.	Citrus Bowl	Camping World Stadium; Orlando, Florida	ABC	No. 14 Northwestern Wildcats (6–2); Auburn Tigers (6–4)	Big Ten; SEC	Northwestern 35; Auburn 19
Jan. 2	12:00 p.m.	Gator Bowl	TIAA Bank Field; Jacksonville, Florida	ESPN	Kentucky Wildcats (4–6); No. 23 NC State Wolfpack (8–3)	SEC; ACC	Kentucky 23; NC State 21
Jan. 2	12:30 p.m.	Outback Bowl	Raymond James Stadium; Tampa, Florida	ABC	Ole Miss Rebels (4–5); No. 11 Indiana Hoosiers (6–1)	SEC; Big Ten	Ole Miss 26; Indiana 20

=== FCS bowl game ===
The Celebration Bowl, held between the champions of the FCS Mid-Eastern Athletic Conference (MEAC) and Southwestern Athletic Conference (SWAC) was canceled, due to both conferences having postponed football to spring 2021 due to COVID-19.

The NCAA has likewise delayed the Division I FCS tournament to April 2021, with the 2021 NCAA Division I Football Championship Game scheduled to occur in May 2021.

=== All-star games ===
The East–West Shrine Bowl and NFLPA Collegiate Bowl were canceled due to COVID-19 concerns.

Date	Time (EST)	Game	Site	Television	Participants	Results
Jan. 17		Tropical Bowl	Celebration High School; Celebration, Florida		National Team; American Team	National 20; American 17
Jan. 30	2:30 p.m.	Senior Bowl	Hancock Whitney Stadium; Mobile, Alabama	NFL Network	National Team; American Team	National 27; American 24
Jan. 31	9:30 p.m.	Hula Bowl	Aloha Stadium; Honolulu, Hawaii	CBS Sports Network	Team Kai; Team Aina	Kai 15; Aina 13

== Team selections ==
In mid-October, the NCAA waived its usual bowl eligibility requirements. In early November, the Pac-12 Conference announced that its teams would need to have at least a .500 record to be considered for a bowl game. Additionally, the Mid-American Conference (MAC) only allowed their top two teams to go to bowl games.

=== Programs removed from bowl consideration ===
Multiple programs opted out of, or were otherwise removed from, bowl consideration in advance of final CFP standings and bowl announcements on December 20. Each program is listed with its win–loss record and the date its removal was announced.

- Middle Tennessee Blue Raiders (3–6), December 5 — ended season.
- LSU Tigers (5–5), December 9 — opted out of bowl consideration as part of a self-imposed one-year postseason ban over Level III sanctions involving former LSU wide receiver Odell Beckham Jr.
- Boston College Eagles (6–5), December 10 — opted out.
- Pittsburgh Panthers (6–5), December 11 — opted out.
- Virginia Cavaliers (5–5), December 13 — opted out.
- Stanford Cardinal (4–2), December 13 — opted out.
- Georgia Tech Yellow Jackets (3–7), December 14 — opted out.
- SMU Mustangs (7–3), December 15 — originally selected to play in the Frisco Bowl, but withdrew due to pandemic concerns within the team, leading to the bowl's cancellation.
- Kansas State Wildcats (4–6), December 16 — opted out.
- Virginia Tech Hokies (5–6), December 16 — opted out. The program had appeared in 27 consecutive bowl games, dating back to the 1993 Independence Bowl. At the time of opting out, this was the longest active bowl appearance streak, and the fourth-longest in college football history.
- Louisville Cardinals (4–7), December 16 — advised by the ACC that "we're not in line for a bowl".
- San Diego State Aztecs (4–4), December 16 — opted out.
- UCLA Bruins (3–4), December 17 — opted out.
- Utah Utes (3–2), December 18 — opted out.
- Washington Huskies (3–1), December 18 — opted out. The Huskies also had to give up their spot in the 2020 Pac-12 Football Championship Game, due to having an insufficient number of players available.
- USC Trojans (5–1), December 19 — opted out.
- Penn State Nittany Lions (4–5), December 19 — opted out.
- Minnesota Golden Gophers (3–4), December 20 — opted out.
- Nebraska Cornhuskers (3–5), December 20 — opted out.
- Michigan State Spartans (2–5), December 20 — opted out.
- Arizona State Sun Devils (2–2), December 20 — opted out.
- Maryland Terrapins (2–3), December 20 — opted out.
- Boise State Broncos (5–2), December 20 — opted out. The program had appeared in 18 consecutive bowl games, dating back to the 2002 Humanitarian Bowl.

The following programs dropped out of their respective bowl games after the pairings were set:

- Tennessee Volunteers (3–7), December 21 — accepted a bid to the Liberty Bowl, but dropped out the next day due to a rise in positive COVID cases within the program. Tennessee was replaced by Army (9–2) in the Liberty Bowl.
- South Carolina Gamecocks (2–8), December 22 — accepted a bid to the Gasparilla Bowl, but dropped out two days later due to a rise in COVID cases.
- Missouri Tigers (5–5), December 27 — accepted a bid to the Music City Bowl but dropped out due to a rise in COVID cases.
- TCU Horned Frogs (6–4), December 29 — accepted a bid to the Texas Bowl but dropped out due to a rise in COVID cases.

=== Bowl teams with losing records ===
Nine teams with losing records received bowl invitations, the first such occurrences since the 2016 season:

- Arkansas Razorbacks (3–7) to the Texas Bowl — cancelled due to a rise of COVID cases within the TCU program.
- Houston Cougars (3–4) to the New Mexico Bowl
- Kentucky Wildcats (4–6) to the Gator Bowl
- Mississippi State Bulldogs (3–7) to the Armed Forces Bowl
- North Texas Mean Green (4–5) to the Myrtle Beach Bowl
- Ole Miss Rebels (4–5) to the Outback Bowl
- South Carolina Gamecocks (2–8) to the Gasparilla Bowl — subsequently withdrew
- Tennessee Volunteers (3–7) to the Liberty Bowl — subsequently withdrew
- Western Kentucky Hilltoppers (5–6) to the LendingTree Bowl

Six of the nine teams played their bowls, recording three wins (Kentucky, Mississippi State, and Ole Miss) and three losses (Houston, North Texas, and Western Kentucky).

=== CFP top 25 standings and bowl games ===
On December 20, 2020, the College Football Playoff selection committee announced its final team rankings for the year.

This was the seventh year of the College Football Playoff era. Of the 28 playoff spots awarded during that time, 22 went to Alabama (6), Clemson (6), Ohio State (4), Oklahoma (4), and Notre Dame (2).

Rank	Team	W–L	Conference and standing	Bowl game
1	Alabama Crimson Tide	11–0	SEC champions	Rose Bowl (CFP semifinal)
2	Clemson Tigers	10–1	ACC champions	Sugar Bowl (CFP semifinal)
3	Ohio State Buckeyes	6–0	Big Ten champions	Sugar Bowl (CFP semifinal)
4	Notre Dame Fighting Irish	10–1	ACC first place	Rose Bowl (CFP semifinal)
5	Texas A&M Aggies	8–1	SEC West Division second place	Orange Bowl (NY6)
6	Oklahoma Sooners	8–2	Big 12 champions	Cotton Bowl (NY6)
7	Florida Gators	8–3	SEC East Division champions	Cotton Bowl (NY6)
8	Cincinnati Bearcats	9–0	American champions	Peach Bowl (NY6)
9	Georgia Bulldogs	7–2	SEC East Division second place	Peach Bowl (NY6)
10	Iowa State Cyclones	8–3	Big 12 first place	Fiesta Bowl (NY6)
11	Indiana Hoosiers	6–1	Big Ten East Division second place	Outback Bowl
12	Coastal Carolina Chanticleers	11–0	Sun Belt co-champions	Cure Bowl
13	North Carolina Tar Heels	8–3	ACC fourth place (tie)	Orange Bowl (NY6)
14	Northwestern Wildcats	6–2	Big Ten West Division champions	Citrus Bowl
15	Iowa Hawkeyes	6–2	Big Ten West Division second place	Music City Bowl (canceled)
16	BYU Cougars	10–1	Independent	Boca Raton Bowl
17	USC Trojans	5–1	Pac-12 South Division champions	none (opted out)
18	Miami (FL) Hurricanes	8–2	ACC third place	Cheez-It Bowl
19	Louisiana Ragin' Cajuns	9–1	Sun Belt co-champions	First Responder Bowl
20	Texas Longhorns	6–3	Big 12 fourth place	Alamo Bowl
21	Oklahoma State Cowboys	7–3	Big 12 third place	Cheez-It Bowl
22	San Jose State Spartans	7–0	Mountain West champions	Arizona Bowl
23	NC State Wolfpack	8–3	ACC fourth place (tie)	Gator Bowl
24	Tulsa Golden Hurricane	6–2	American second place	Armed Forces Bowl
25	Oregon Ducks	4–2	Pac-12 champions	Fiesta Bowl (NY6)

=== Conference champions' bowl games ===
Ranks are per the final CFP rankings, released on December 20, with win–loss records at that time. Two bowls featured a matchup of conference champions—the Arizona Bowl and the Sugar Bowl. Champions of the Power Five conferences were assured of a spot in a New Year's Six bowl game.

Conference	Champion	W–L	Rank	Bowl game
ACC	Clemson Tigers	10–1	2	Sugar Bowl (semifinal)
American	Cincinnati Bearcats	9–0	8	Peach Bowl (NY6)
Big Ten	Ohio State Buckeyes	6–0	3	Sugar Bowl (semifinal)
Big 12	Oklahoma Sooners	8–2	6	Cotton Bowl (NY6)
C-USA	UAB Blazers	6–3	–	Gasparilla Bowl (canceled)
MAC	Ball State Cardinals	6–1	–	Arizona Bowl
Mountain West	San Jose State Spartans	7–0	22	Arizona Bowl
Pac-12	Oregon Ducks	4–2	25	Fiesta Bowl (NY6)
SEC	Alabama Crimson Tide	11–0	1	Rose Bowl (semifinal)
Sun Belt†	Coastal Carolina Chanticleers	11–0	12	Cure Bowl
Sun Belt†	Louisiana Ragin' Cajuns	9–1	19	First Responder Bowl

† The Sun Belt Championship Game was canceled due to COVID-19 issues, resulting in co-champions being declared.

== Television ratings ==
All times Eastern. CFP Rankings.

=== Non-CFP bowl games ===
Rank	Date	Matchup				Network	Viewers (millions)	TV rating	Game	Location
1	January 1, 2021, 12:00 p.m.	No. 9 Georgia	24	No. 8 Cincinnati	21	ESPN	8.7	4.9	Peach Bowl	Mercedes-Benz Stadium, Atlanta, GA
2	January 1, 2021, 8:00 p.m.	No. 13 North Carolina	27	No. 5 Texas A&M	41	ESPN	7.6	4.3	Orange Bowl	Hard Rock Stadium, Miami Gardens, FL
3	January 2, 2021, 4:00 p.m.	No. 25 Oregon	17	No. 10 Iowa State	34	ESPN	6.7	3.8	Fiesta Bowl	State Farm Stadium, Glendale, AZ
4	December 30, 2020, 8:00 p.m.	No. 7 Florida	20	No. 6 Oklahoma	55	ESPN	5.8	3.2	Cotton Bowl Classic	AT&T Stadium, Arlington, TX
5	January 1, 2021, 1:00 p.m.	Auburn	19	No. 14 Northwestern	35	ABC	4.8	2.8	Citrus Bowl	Camping World Stadium, Orlando, FL
6	January 2, 2021, 12:30 p.m.	Ole Miss	26	No. 11 Indiana	20	ABC	4.1	2.5	Outback Bowl	Raymond James Stadium, Tampa, FL
7	December 31, 2020, 4:00 p.m.	West Virginia	24	Army	21	ESPN	3.7	2.2	Liberty Bowl	Liberty Bowl Memorial Stadium, Memphis, TN
8	December 29, 2020, 5:30 p.m.	No. 21 Oklahoma State	37	No. 18 Miami (FL)	34	ESPN	3.2	1.8	Cheez-It Bowl	Camping World Stadium, Orlando, FL
9	December 29, 2020, 9:00 p.m.	No. 20 Texas	55	Colorado	23	ESPN	3.0	1.7	Alamo Bowl	Alamodome, San Antonio, TX
10	January 2, 2021, 12:00 p.m.	No. 23 NC State	21	Kentucky	23	ESPN	2.7	1.7	Gator Bowl	TIAA Bank Field, Jacksonville, FL

=== College Football Playoff ===
Game	Date	Matchup				Network	Viewers (millions)	TV rating	Location
Rose Bowl (semifinal)	January 1, 2021, 4:30 p.m.	No. 4 Notre Dame	14	No. 1 Alabama	31	ESPN	18.9	9.6	AT&T Stadium, Arlington, TX
Sugar Bowl (semifinal)	January 1, 2021, 8:00 p.m.	No. 3 Ohio State	49	No. 2 Clemson	28	ESPN	19.1	9.8	Mercedes-Benz Superdome, New Orleans, LA
National Championship	January 11, 2021, 8:00 p.m.	No. 3 Ohio State	24	No. 1 Alabama	52	ESPN	18.6		Hard Rock Stadium, Miami Gardens, FL
