= 2020 NCAA football bowl games =

In college football, 2020 NCAA football bowl games may refer to:

- 2019–20 NCAA football bowl games, for games played in January 2020 as part of the 2019 season.
- 2020–21 NCAA football bowl games, for games played in December 2020 as part of the 2020 season.
