= 2021 NCAA football bowl games =

In college football, 2021 NCAA football bowl games may refer to:

- 2020–21 NCAA football bowl games, for games played in January 2021 as part of the 2020 season.
- 2021–22 NCAA football bowl games, for games played in December 2021 as part of the 2021 season.
