= Carlo Kemp =

American football player (born 1998)

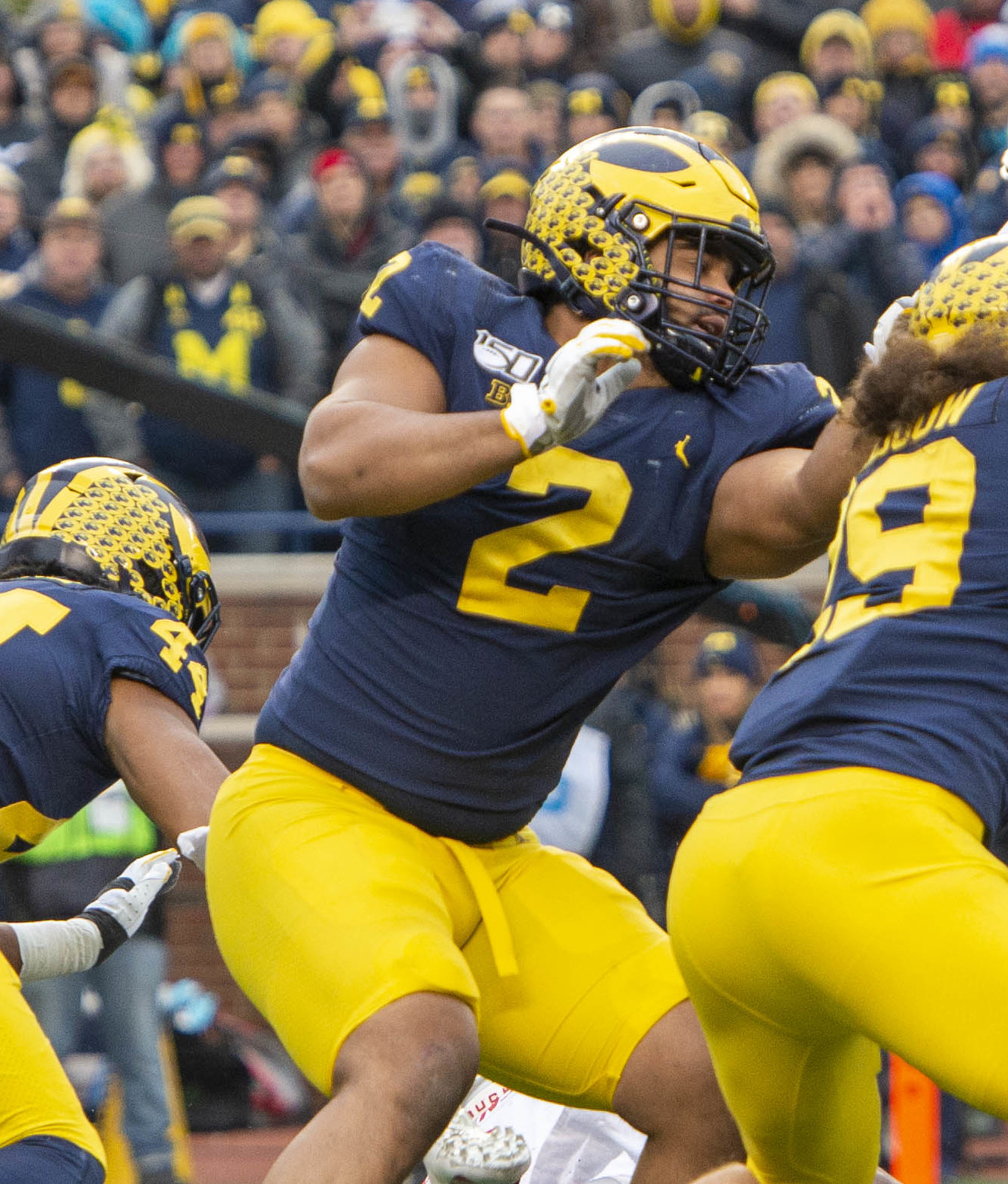
- Kemp with the Michigan Wolverines in 2019

No. 2, 54
- Position: Linebacker

Personal information
- Born: January 1, 1998 (age 28); Boulder, Colorado, U.S.
- Listed height: 6 ft 3 in (1.91 m)
- Listed weight: 281 lb (127 kg)

Career information
- High school: Fairview
- College: Michigan
- NFL draft: 2021: undrafted

Career history
- Green Bay Packers (2021)*; Denver Broncos (2021)*; Pittsburgh Maulers (2022); Los Angeles Chargers (2022–2023)*; Birmingham Stallions (2024)*; Houston Roughnecks (2024)
- * Offseason or practice squad member only
- Stats at Pro Football Reference

Carlo Kemp (born January 1, 1998) is an American former football linebacker. He played professionally for the Pittsburgh Maulers of the United States Football League (USFL). He played college football at Michigan.

== Early life ==
Kemp was a four-year letterman at Fairview High School. He was a second-team All-Conference selection as a freshman. As a sophomore, he was named to the All-State first-team. In his junior season, he recorded 66 tackles, 20 tackles-for-loss, eight sacks and 11 rushing touchdowns. Following the season he again received first-team All-Conference and first-team All-State honors. As a senior he settled into the outside linebacker position, recording 81 tackles, seven tackles-for-loss, four sacks and one blocked field goal. Following the season he again received first-team All-Conference and first-team All-State honors. He also received The Denver Post's Gold Helmet Award, as Colorado's top high school senior football player, for outstanding play, academics and citizenship. He finished his career with 203 tackles, averaging 5.3 tackles per game, 14 career sacks, and one interception.

Kemp was regarded as the best high school prospect out of the state of Colorado. He received scholarship offers from Arizona State, Boise State, Colorado, Colorado State, Michigan, Nebraska, Notre Dame, Kansas State, Oregon, Stanford, UCLA, Washington, Washington State, Wisconsin and Wyoming. After official visits to Colorado, Michigan and Notre Dame, he committed to play for the Michigan Wolverines on November 8, 2015.

== College career ==
Kemp played college football for the Michigan Wolverines football team from 2016 to 2020. During his freshman season in 2016, he made his collegiate debut on September 17, 2016, in a game against Colorado. During his sophomore season in 2017, he played in all 13 games. He began his career as a linebacker, then following the 2017 season, he became a defensive lineman. During his junior season in 2018 he appeared in all 13 games, including 12 starts on the defensive line, and recorded 17 tackles.

On August 21, 2019, he was named captain for the 2019 season. During his senior season in 2019, he started 12 games and recorded 40 tackles, with 4.5 tackles-for-loss. Following the season he was named third-team All-Big Ten by the coaches. During his fifth-year senior season in 2020 he appeared in all six games with five starts on the defensive line, and recorded 21 tackles, and three tackles-for-loss, in a season that was shortened due to the COVID-19 pandemic. Following the season he was named All-Big Ten honorable mention. Kemp participated in the 2021 Hula Bowl, where he was named Team Aina's Defensive MVP for the contest after he recorded four tackles in addition to a pick six.

== Professional career ==
Pre-draft measurables
Height	Weight	Arm length	Hand span	40-yard dash	10-yard split	20-yard split	20-yard shuttle	Three-cone drill	Vertical jump	Broad jump	Bench press
6 ft 2 1/2 in (1.89 m)	281 lb (127 kg)	30 1/8 in (0.77 m)	9 5/8 in (0.24 m)	5.07 s	1.72 s	2.89 s	4.57 s	7.33 s	28.5 in (0.72 m)	8 ft 1 in (2.46 m)	27 reps
All values from Pro Day

=== Green Bay Packers ===
After going undrafted in the 2021 NFL draft, he signed with the Green Bay Packers as an undrafted free agent on May 2, 2021. He was waived by the Packers on August 31, 2021.

=== Denver Broncos ===
On December 31, 2021, Kemp was signed by the Denver Broncos to the practice squad. He was released by the Broncos on January 3, 2022.

=== Pittsburgh Maulers ===
On February 22, 2022, Kemp was drafted 10th overall by the Pittsburgh Maulers in the 2022 USFL draft. He led the Maulers with five sacks during the 2022 USFL season.

=== Los Angeles Chargers ===
On July 21, 2022, Kemp signed with the Los Angeles Chargers of the NFL. He was waived on August 30, 2022, and signed to the practice squad the next day. He signed a reserve/future contract on January 17, 2023. He was waived on August 29, 2023.

=== Birmingham Stallions ===
On December 22, 2023, Kemp signed with the Birmingham Stallions of the United States Football League (USFL). He was waived by the team in March 2024.

=== Houston Roughnecks ===
On March 13, 2024, Kemp was claimed off waivers by the Houston Roughnecks. He retired on April 16, 2024.

== Personal life ==
Kemp is the nephew of former Indianapolis Colts head coach Chuck Pagano and Denver Broncos outside linebackers coach John Pagano. He is the grandson of Sam Pagano, a Colorado Sports Hall of Fame inductee and former head coach at Boulder's Fairview High.
