= 2020 Alamo Bowl =

Postseason college football bowl game

2020 Valero Alamo Bowl
- 28th Alamo Bowl
Texas Longhorns	Colorado Buffaloes
(6–3)	(4–1)
Big 12	Pac-12
55	23
Head coach: Tom Herman	Head coach: Karl Dorrell
AP / Coaches / CFP; 20 / 24 / 20
	1	2	3	4	Total
Texas	14	3	17	21	55
Colorado	0	10	6	7	23
- Date: December 29, 2020
- Season: 2020
- Stadium: Alamodome
- Location: San Antonio, Texas
- MVP: Offense: Bijan Robinson (RB, Texas); Defense: DeMarvion Overshown (LB, Texas)
- Favorite: Texas by 12
- Referee: Marc Curles (SEC)
- Attendance: 10,822

United States TV coverage
- Network: ESPN and ESPN Radio
- Announcers: ESPN: Jason Benetti (play-by-play); Mike Golic Sr. (analyst); Kris Budden (sideline); ESPN Radio: Marc Kestecher (play-by-play); Trevor Matich (analyst)

International TV coverage
- Network: ESPN Deportes

The 2020 Alamo Bowl was a college football bowl game played on December 29, 2020, with kickoff scheduled for 9:00 p.m. EST (8:00 p.m. local CST) on ESPN. It was the 28th edition of the Alamo Bowl, and was one of the 2020–21 bowl games concluding the 2020 FBS football season. Sponsored by Valero Energy, the game was officially known as the Valero Alamo Bowl.

== Teams ==
The game featured Texas of the Big 12 Conference and Colorado of the Pac-12 Conference, consistent with the bowl's conference tie-ins. The programs had previously met 18 times, most recently in 2009, with Texas holding an 11–7 edge. Their prior meetings include one bowl game, the 1975 Astro-Bluebonnet Bowl, won by Texas.

=== Texas Longhorns ===
Texas entered the bowl with a 6–3 record (5–3 in conference), ranked 20th in the AP Poll and CFP rankings. Their losses were to TCU, Oklahoma, and ranked Iowa State. Texas had a 3–1 record in four prior Alamo Bowls, most recently winning the 2019 edition.

=== Colorado Buffaloes ===
Colorado entered the bowl with a 4–1 record (3–1 in conference); their loss was to Utah. Colorado had played in two prior Alamo Bowls, losing the 2002 and 2016 editions.

== Game summary ==
2020 Valero Alamo Bowl

Quarter	1	2	3	4	Total
No. 20 Texas	14	3	17	21	55
Colorado	0	10	6	7	23

at Alamodome • San Antonio, Texas

- Date: Tuesday, December 29, 2020
- Game time: 9:00 p.m. EST (8:00 p.m. CST)
- Game weather: Temperature: 68 °F (20 °C) (domed stadium)
- Referee: Marc Curles (SEC)
- TV announcers (ESPN): Dave Pasch (play-by-play), Mike Golic Sr. (analyst) and Kris Budden (sideline)
- ESPN game summary

Game information

First quarter

- (12:51) TEX – Bijan Robinson 8 yard rush, Cameron Dicker kick (Drive: 4 plays, 74 yards, 0:50; Texas 7–0)
- (5:28) TEX — Bijan Robinson 14 yard pass from Sam Ehlinger, Cameron Dicker kick (Drive: 6 plays, 89 yards, 2:37; Texas 14–0)

Second quarter

- (6:58) COLO — Jarek Broussard 2 yard rush, Evan Price kick (Drive: 10 plays, 50 yards, 5:11; Texas 14–7)
- (2:07) TEX — Cameron Dicker 53 yard field goal (Drive: 6 plays, 58 yards, 1:57; Texas 17–7)
- (0:43) COLO — Evan Price 40 yard field goal (Drive: 8 plays, 53 yards, 1:24; Texas 17–10)

Third quarter

- (14:23) TEX — Joshua Moore 13 yard pass from Casey Thompson, Cameron Dicker kick (Drive: 2 plays, 79 yards, 0:37; Texas 24–10)
- (8:00) TEX — Joshua Moore 25 yard pass from Casey Thompson, Cameron Dicker kick (Drive: 5 plays, 80 yards, 2:10; Texas 31–10)
- (3:33) TEX — Cameron Dicker 35 yard field goal (Drive: 7 plays, 43 yards, 3:19; Texas 34–10)
- (1:46) COLO — Jarek Broussard 3 yard rush, two-point pass incomplete (Drive: 5 plays, 75 yards, 1:47; Texas 34–16)

Fourth quarter

- (14:42) TEX — Bijan Robinson 23 yard pass from Casey Thompson, Cameron Dicker kick (Drive: 5 plays, 75 yards, 2:04; Texas 41–16)
- (11:48) COLO — Brendon Lewis 2 yard rush, Evan Price kick (Drive: 7 plays, 75 yards, 2:54; Texas 41–23)
- (11:01) TEX — Kelvontay Dixon 73 yard pass from Casey Thompson, Cameron Dicker kick (Drive: 2 plays, 75 yards, 0:47; Texas 48–23)
- (7:40) TEX — Roschon Johnson 21 yard rush, Cameron Dicker kick (Drive: 1 plays, 21 yards, 0:15; Texas 55–23)

=== Statistics ===
Statistics	TEX	COLO
First downs	26	20
Plays–yards	68–638	79–378
Rushes–yards	40–303	46–182
Passing yards	335	196
Passing: comp–att–int	19–28–0	14–33–2
Time of possession	29:02	30:58

Team	Category	Player	Statistics
Texas	Passing	Casey Thompson	8-for-10, 170 yards, 4 TD
Texas	Rushing	Bijan Robinson	183 yards on 10 carries, 1 TD
Texas	Receiving	Joshua Moore	86 yards on 5 receptions, 2 TD
Colorado	Passing	Sam Noyer	8-for-23, 101 yards, 2 INT
Colorado	Rushing	Jarek Broussard	82 yards on 27 carries, 2 TD
Colorado	Receiving	Dimitri Stanley	86 yards on 4 receptions
