= 2020 Armed Forces Bowl (December) =

Postseason college football bowl game

2020 Lockheed Martin Armed Forces Bowl
- 18th Armed Forces Bowl
Tulsa Golden Hurricane	Mississippi State Bulldogs
(6–2)	(3–7)
The American	SEC
26	28
Head coach: Philip Montgomery	Head coach: Mike Leach
AP / Coaches / CFP; 22 / 25 / 24
	1	2	3	4	Total
Tulsa	0	6	7	13	26
Mississippi State	7	0	14	7	28
- Date: December 31, 2020
- Season: 2020
- Stadium: Amon G. Carter Stadium
- Location: Fort Worth, Texas
- MVP: Lideatrick Griffin (WR/KR, Miss. State) & Christian Williams (DB, Tulsa)
- Favorite: Tulsa by 2.5
- Referee: Jeff Servinski (Big Ten)
- Attendance: 9,000

United States TV coverage
- Network: ESPN
- Announcers: Chris Cotter (play-by-play); Mark Herzlich (analyst); Ian Fitzsimmons (sideline)

International TV coverage
- Network: ESPN Deportes

The 2020 Armed Forces Bowl was a college football bowl game played on December 31, 2020, with kickoff at noon EST (11:00 a.m. local CST). It was the 18th edition of the Armed Forces Bowl, and was one of the 2020–21 bowl games concluding the 2020 FBS football season. The game was officially named the Lockheed Martin Armed Forces Bowl after its corporate sponsor Lockheed Martin.

== Teams ==
Following the cancellation of the Las Vegas Bowl, it had been announced that the game would feature its tie-ins with the Pac-12 Conference and the Southeastern Conference (SEC). The presence of a Pac-12 team did not come to fruition, with the Tulsa Golden Hurricane of the American Athletic Conference ("The American") accepting a bid for the Armed Forces Bowl instead. This game was the first matchup between the two programs.

=== Mississippi State ===
Mississippi State of the SEC accepted their bid on December 20, 2020. The Bulldogs entered the bowl with an overall record of 3–7; they were ranked at number 16 in the AP Poll early in the season after defeating the defending national champions, LSU. This marked the second time in program history that Mississippi State had entered a bowl game with a losing record (the prior instance being the 2016 St. Petersburg Bowl). This was the Bulldogs' first appearance in the bowl.

=== Tulsa ===
Tulsa of The American accepted their bid on December 20, 2020. The Golden Hurricane entered the bowl with an overall record of 6–2 (6–0 in conference play); they were ranked at number 22 in the AP Poll entering the bowl. Tulsa was 0–2 in prior editions of the bowl, having lost in 2006 and 2011.

== Game summary ==
2020 Lockheed Martin Armed Forces Bowl

Quarter	1	2	3	4	Total
No. 24 Tulsa	0	6	7	13	26
Mississippi State	7	0	14	7	28

at Amon G. Carter Stadium • Fort Worth, Texas

- Date: Thursday, December 31, 2020
- Game time: 12:00 p.m. EST (11:00 a.m. CST)
- Game weather: Rain • Temperature: 37 °F (3 °C) • Wind: NNE 16 mph
- Referee: Jeff Servinski (Big Ten)
- TV announcers (ESPN): Chris Cotter (play-by-play), Mark Herzlich (analyst) and Ian Fitzsimmons (sideline)
- ESPN game summary

Game information

First quarter

- (13:41) MSST – Jo'Quavious Marks 28 yard rush, Jace Christmann kick (Drive: 3 plays, 39 yards, 1:19; Mississippi State 7–0)

Second quarter

- (11:15) TLSA – Zack Long 27 yard field goal (Drive: 11 plays, 72 yards, 4:07; Mississippi State 7–3)
- (2:34) TLSA – Zack Long 33 yard field goal (Drive: 11 plays, 78 yards, 4:51; Mississippi State 7–6)

Third quarter

- (9:04) MSST – Will Rogers 13 yard rush, Jace Christmann kick (Drive: 9 plays, 64 yards, 5:17; Mississippi State 14–6)
- (6:37) TLSA – Deneric Prince 14 yard rush, Zack Long kick (Drive: 7 plays, 75 yards, 2:27; Mississippi State 14–13)
- (3:29) MSST – Emmanuel Forbes 90 yard interception return, Jace Christmann kick (Mississippi State 21–13)

Fourth quarter

- (12:30) TLSA – Corey Taylor II 5 yard rush, 2-point pass failed (Drive: 9 plays, 32 yards, 3:11; Mississippi State 21–19)
- (8:01) MSST – Lideatrick Griffin 13 yard pass from Will Rogers, Jace Christmann kick (Drive: 11 plays, 65 yards, 4:29; Mississippi State 28–19)
- (1:23) TLSA – Keylon Stokes 15 yard pass from Zach Smith, Zack Long kick (Drive: 6 plays, 55 yards, 1:31; Mississippi State 28–26)

=== Statistics ===
Statistics	TLSA	MSST
First downs	27	16
Plays–yards	86–484	60–271
Rushes–yards	40–137	30–123
Passing yards	347	148
Passing: comp–att–int	26–46–2	19–30–0
Turnovers		
Time of possession	31:19	28:41

Team	Category	Player	Statistics
Tulsa	Passing	Zach Smith	26/46, 347 yards, 1 TD, 2 INT
Tulsa	Rushing	Corey Taylor II	20 carries, 85 yards, 1 TD
Tulsa	Receiving	Keylon Stokes	9 receptions, 117 yards, 1 TD
Mississippi State	Passing	Will Rogers	19/30, 148 yards, 1 TD
Mississippi State	Rushing	Jo'Quavious Marks	11 carries, 72 yards, 1 TD
Mississippi State	Receiving	Austin Williams	3 receptions, 42 yards

Emmanuel Forbes, cornerback for Mississippi State, set a school and Armed Forces Bowl record for the longest interception return (90 yards).

== Post-game ==
Following the conclusion of the game, a brawl broke out between the two teams.
