= 2021 Fiesta Bowl =

Postseason college football bowl game

2021 PlayStation Fiesta Bowl
- CFP New Year's Six; 50th Fiesta Bowl
Oregon Ducks	Iowa State Cyclones
(4–2)	(8–3)
Pac-12	Big 12
17	34
Head coach: Mario Cristobal	Head coach: Matt Campbell
AP / Coaches / CFP; 25 / RV / 25	AP / Coaches / CFP; 12 / 12 / 10
	1	2	3	4	Total
Oregon	7	10	0	0	17
Iowa State	7	21	3	3	34
- Date: January 2, 2021
- Season: 2020
- Stadium: State Farm Stadium
- Location: Glendale, Arizona
- MVP: Offense: Brock Purdy (QB, Iowa State) Defense: O'Rien Vance (LB, Iowa State)
- Favorite: Iowa State by 4.5
- Referee: David Smith (SEC)
- Attendance: 0 (family members only)

United States TV coverage
- Network: ESPN and ESPN Radio
- Announcers: ESPN: Dave Pasch (play-by-play); Mike Golic (analyst); Quint Kessenich (sideline); ESPN Radio: Marc Kestecher and Ben Hartsock

The 2021 Fiesta Bowl was a college football bowl game played on January 2, 2021, with kickoff at 4:00 p.m. EST (2:00 p.m. local MST). It was the 50th edition of the Fiesta Bowl, and was one of the 2020–21 bowl games concluding the 2020 FBS football season. Sponsored by video game brand PlayStation, the game was officially known as the PlayStation Fiesta Bowl. The bowl was celebrating its 50th anniversary, having been first played in 1971.

Due to the COVID-19 pandemic in Arizona, it was announced in early December that the game would be played behind closed doors, with only players' family members admitted.

== Teams ==
As one of the New Year's Six bowl games, the participants of the game were determined by the College Football Playoff selection committee. The committee matched Oregon of the Pac-12 Conference and Iowa State of the Big 12 Conference, in the first meeting between the two teams.

=== Oregon ===
Oregon won the Pac-12 title after beating USC in the Pac-12 Championship Game on December 18, and received the conference's automatic bid to a New Year's Six bowl game. The team accepted a berth to the Fiesta Bowl on December 20, which was the program's third-ever Fiesta Bowl, after the 2002 and 2013 editions.

=== Iowa State ===
Iowa State lost to Oklahoma in the Big 12 Championship Game on December 19. They were eligible for an at-large selection to a New Year's Six bowl game, being ranked 10th in the College Football Playoff rankings on December 20, and received and accepted an invitation to the Fiesta Bowl that day. This was both Iowa State's first-ever Fiesta Bowl and New Year's Six bowl appearance.

== Game summary ==
2021 PlayStation Fiesta Bowl

Quarter	1	2	3	4	Total
No. 25 Oregon	7	10	0	0	17
No. 10 Iowa State	7	21	3	3	34

at State Farm Stadium • Glendale, Arizona

- Date: Saturday, January 2, 2021
- Game time: 4:00 p.m. EST (2:00 p.m. MST)
- Game weather: n/a (game played indoors)
- Referee: David Smith (SEC)
- TV announcers (ESPN): Dave Pasch (play-by-play), Mike Golic (analyst), and Quint Kessenich (sideline)
- ESPN game summary

Game information

First quarter

- (7:24) ISU – Breece Hall 1 yard rush, Connor Assalley kick (Drive: 15 plays, 75 yards, 7:36; Iowa State 7–0)
- (4:14) ORE – Anthony Brown 6 yard rush, Henry Katleman kick (Drive: 7 plays, 73 yards, 3:10; Tied 7–7)

Second quarter

- (10:58) ISU – Charlie Kolar 14 yard pass from Brock Purdy, Connor Assalley kick (Drive: 14 plays, 69 yards, 8:09; Iowa State 14–7)
- (3:17) ORE – Anthony Brown 16 yard rush, Henry Katleman kick (Drive: 9 plays, 98 yards, 3:21; Tied 14–14)
- (1:44) ISU – Brock Purdy 1 yard rush, Connor Assalley kick (Drive: 6 plays, 75 yards, 1:33; Iowa State 21–14)
- (1:27) ISU – Breece Hall 1 yard rush, Connor Assalley kick (Drive: 3 plays, 27 yards, 0:17; Iowa State 28–14)
- (0:13) ORE – Henry Katleman 47 yard field goal (Drive: 8 plays, 48 yards, 1:10; Iowa State 28–17)

Third quarter

- (6:30) ISU – Connor Assalley 33 yard field goal (Drive: 4 plays, –2 yards, 1:33; Iowa State 31–17)

Fourth quarter

- (6:11) ISU – Connor Assalley 39 yard field goal (Drive: 13 plays, 55 yards, 7:57; Iowa State 34–17)

=== Statistics ===
Statistics	ORE	ISU
First downs	17	25
Plays–yards	46–312	85–384
Rushes–yards	18–86	56–228
Passing yards	226	156
Passing: comp–att–int	19–28–1	20–29–0
Turnovers		
Time of possession	17:12	42:48

Team	Category	Player	Statistics
Oregon	Passing	Anthony Brown	12/19, 147 yards
Oregon	Rushing	Travis Dye	8 carries, 52 yards
Oregon	Receiving	Johnny Johnson III	4 receptions, 41 yards
Iowa State	Passing	Brock Purdy	20/29, 156 yards, 1 TD
Iowa State	Rushing	Breece Hall	34 carries, 136 yards, 2 TD
Iowa State	Receiving	Charlie Kolar	5 receptions, 53 yards, 1 TD
