= 2020 Arizona Bowl =

Postseason college football bowl game

2020 Offerpad Arizona Bowl
- 6th Arizona Bowl
Ball State Cardinals	San Jose State Spartans
(6–1)	(7–0)
MAC	MWC
34	13
Head coach: Mike Neu	Head coach: Brent Brennan
	AP / Coaches / CFP; 19 / 20 / 22
	1	2	3	4	Total
Ball State	27	0	7	0	34
San Jose State	0	0	13	0	13
- Date: December 31, 2020
- Season: 2020
- Stadium: Arizona Stadium
- Location: Tucson, Arizona
- MVP: Drew Plitt (QB, Ball State) & Bryce Cosby (S, Ball State)
- Favorite: San Jose State by 9
- Referee: Joe Lehring (C-USA)
- Attendance: 0

United States TV coverage
- Network: CBS
- Announcers: Brad Nessler (play–by–play); Rick Neuheisel (analyst); Jenny Dell (sideline)

The 2020 Arizona Bowl was a college football bowl game played on December 31, 2020, with kickoff at 2:00 p.m. EST (12:00 p.m. local MST). It was the sixth edition of the Arizona Bowl, and was one of the 2020–21 bowl games concluding the 2020 FBS football season. On October 30, it was announced that the game would be played behind closed doors without spectators, due to the COVID-19 pandemic in Arizona. Sponsored by real estate agency Offerpad, the game was officially known as the Offerpad Arizona Bowl.

With the cancellation of the Sun Bowl, on December 10 it was announced that television coverage of the Arizona Bowl would be moved from CBS Sports Network to the CBS broadcast network.

== Teams ==
The game was played between teams from the Mid-American Conference (MAC) and the Mountain West Conference (MWC), in the first year of a five-year tie-in for the two conferences with the Arizona Bowl.

=== Ball State ===
Ball State accepted a bid to the Arizona Bowl on December 20, after winning the MAC Championship Game on December 18. The Cardinals entered the contest with a 6–1 record, having won six games in a row after an opening loss to Miami (OH), including a win against Buffalo for the conference championship. Ball State was seeking the first bowl game victory in program history. This contest marked their first appearance in the Arizona Bowl.

=== San Jose State ===
San Jose State accepted a bid to the Arizona Bowl following the Spartans' win in the Mountain West Championship Game on December 19. The Spartans entered the bowl with a 7–0 record and ranked No. 19 in the AP Poll, having won each of their six regular season games before defeating Boise State in the conference championship game. The Spartans were looking to complete their first undefeated season since 1939. This was the first Arizona Bowl appearance by the Spartans, and their first game against Ball State.

== Game summary ==
2020 Offerpad Arizona Bowl

Quarter	1	2	3	4	Total
Ball State	27	0	7	0	34
No. 22 San Jose State	0	0	13	0	13

at Arizona Stadium • Tucson, Arizona

- Date: Thursday, December 31, 2020
- Game time: 2:00 p.m. EST (12:00 p.m. MST)
- Game weather: Partly cloudy • Temperature: 55 °F (13 °C) • Wind: ESE 8 mph
- Referee: Joe Lehring (Conference USA)
- TV announcers (CBS): Brad Nessler (play–by–play), Rick Neuheisel (analyst) and Jenny Dell (sideline)
- ESPN game summary

Game information

First quarter

- (12:41) BALL – Antonio Phillips 53 yard interception return, kick failed (Ball State 6–0)
- (10:00) BALL – Will Jones 3 yard rush, Jacob Lewis kick (Drive: 6 plays, 50 yards, 1:50; Ball State 13–0)
- (5:15) BALL – Tye Evans 3 yard rush, Jacob Lewis kick (Drive: 8 plays, 67 yards, 2:41; Ball State 20–0)
- (1:04) BALL – Drew Plitt 1 yard rush, Jacob Lewis kick (Drive: 6 plays, 35 yards, 1:52; Ball State 27–0)

Second quarter
No scoring plays
Third quarter

- (9:42) BALL – Yo'Heinz Tyler 48 yard pass from Drew Plitt, Jacob Lewis kick (Drive: 3 plays, 49 yards, 1:12; Ball State 34–0)
- (9:28) SJSU – Charlie Bostic 99 yard kickoff return, 2-point pass failed (Ball State 34–6)
- (0:01) SJSU – Jermai Braddock 8 yard pass from Nick Starkel, Matt Mercurio kick (Drive: 8 plays, 67 yards, 3:08; Ball State 34–13)

Fourth quarter
No scoring plays

=== Statistics ===
Statistics	BALL	SJSU
First downs	21	18
Plays–yards	70–402	68–347
Rushes–yards	51–185	22–69
Passing yards	217	278
Passing: comp–att–int	12–19–0	26–46–4
Turnovers		
Time of possession	31:17	28:43

Team	Category	Player	Statistics
Ball State	Passing	Drew Plitt	12-for-19, 217 yards, 1 TD
Ball State	Rushing	Will Jones	89 yards on 22 carries, 1 TD
Ball State	Receiving	Yo'Heinz Tyler	103 yards on 4 receptions, 1 TD
San Jose State	Passing	Nick Starkel	25-for-42, 268 yards, 1 TD, 3 INT
San Jose State	Rushing	Tyler Nevens	37 yards on 7 carries
San Jose State	Receiving	Tre Walker	81 yards on 7 receptions
