= 2020 Cheez-It Bowl =

American college football game

- 31st Cheez-It Bowl
Oklahoma State Cowboys	Miami Hurricanes
(7–3)	(8–2)
Big 12	ACC
37	34
Head coach: Mike Gundy	Head coach: Manny Diaz
AP / Coaches / CFP; RV / 21 / 21	AP / Coaches / CFP; 18 / 18 / 18
	1	2	3	4	Total
Oklahoma State	21	0	3	13	37
Miami	0	10	9	15	34
- Date: December 29, 2020
- Season: 2020
- Stadium: Camping World Stadium
- Location: Orlando, Florida
- MVP: Spencer Sanders (QB, Oklahoma State)
- Favorite: Oklahoma State by 1
- Referee: Steve Marlowe (SEC)
- Attendance: 0 (Note: Due to the COVID-19 pandemic, there was no reported attendance at the game.)

United States TV coverage
- Network: ESPN and ESPN Radio
- Announcers: ESPN: Dave O'Brien (play-by-play), Tim Hasselbeck (analyst) and Katie George (sideline); ESPN Radio: Sean Kelley (play-by-play) and Barrett Jones (analyst)

International TV coverage
- Network: ESPN Deportes

The 2020 Cheez-It Bowl was a college football bowl game played on December 29, 2020, with kickoff at 5:30 p.m. EST on ESPN. It was the 31st edition of the Cheez-It Bowl, (Note: Originally known as the Blockbuster Bowl, the bowl has had several different names; the prior three editions were staged as the Camping World Bowl.) and was one of the 2020–21 bowl games concluding the 2020 FBS football season. Food manufacturing company Kellogg Company was the title sponsor of the game, through its Cheez-It brand.

== Teams ==
The game featured Oklahoma State of the Big 12 Conference and Miami of the Atlantic Coast Conference (ACC). The teams had previously met once, in a 1991 contest won by Miami, 40–3.

=== Oklahoma State Cowboys ===
Oklahoma State entered the game with a 7–3 record (6–3 in conference), 21st in CFP rankings. The Cowboys' losses came against Texas, TCU, and ranked Oklahoma. Oklahoma State had played in one prior edition of the Cheez-It Bowl, winning the 2017 Camping World Bowl when it was known by that name.

=== Miami Hurricanes ===
Miami entered the game with an 8–2 record (7–2 in conference), 18th in the AP Poll and CFP rankings. The Hurricanes' two losses were to ranked teams; Clemson and North Carolina. Miami had played in five prior Cheez-It Bowls, when the bowl was known by other names, compiling a 3–2 record.

== Game summary ==
2020 Cheez-It Bowl

Quarter	1	2	3	4	Total
No. 21 Oklahoma State	21	0	3	13	37
No. 18 Miami	0	10	9	15	34

at Camping World Stadium • Orlando, Florida

- Date: Tuesday, December 29, 2020
- Game time: 5:30 p.m. EST
- Game weather: Sunny • Temperature: 70 °F (21 °C) • Wind: ENE 12 mph
- Game attendance: 0
- Referee: Steve Marlowe (SEC)
- TV announcers (ESPN): Dave O'Brien (play-by-play), Tim Hasselbeck (analyst) and Katie George (sideline)
- ESPN game summary

Game information

First quarter

- (11:39) OKST – Brennan Presley 30 yard pass from Spencer Sanders, Brady Pohl kick (Drive: 10 plays, 75 yards, 3:21; Oklahoma State 7–0)
- (5:25) OKST – LD Brown 2 yard rush, Brady Pohl kick (Drive: 8 plays, 82 yards, 3:49; Oklahoma State 14–0)
- (0:56) OKST – Brennan Presley 32 yard pass from Spencer Sanders, Brady Pohl kick (Drive: 6 plays, 49 yards, 2:17; Oklahoma State 21–0)

Second quarter

- (14:14) MIA – Brevin Jordan 10 yard pass from D'Eriq King, José Borregales kick (Drive: 5 plays, 68 yards, 1:42; Oklahoma State 21–7)
- (3:55) MIA – José Borregales 22 yard field goal (Drive: 14 plays, 75 yards, 4:46; Oklahoma State 21–10)

Third quarter

- (13:25) MIA – José Borregales 40 yard field goal (Drive: 8 plays, 41 yards, 1:35; Oklahoma State 21–13)
- (8:45) MIA – Cam'Ron Harris 42 yard rush, 2-point pass failed (Drive: 8 plays, 80 yards, 2:56; Oklahoma State 21–19)
- (2:57) OKST – Brady Pohl 26 yard field goal (Drive: 17 plays, 71 yards, 5:48; Oklahoma State 24–19)

Fourth quarter

- (14:19) OKST — Dillon Stoner 5 yard pass from Spencer Sanders, Brady Pohl kick (Drive: 7 plays, 45 yards, 2:43; Oklahoma State 31–19)
- (12:03) MIA — Brevin Jordan 1 yard pass from N'Kosi Perry, José Borregales kick (Drive: 7 plays, 80 yards, 2:16; Oklahoma State 31–26)
- (9:55) OKST — Brennan Presley 16 yard pass from Spencer Sanders, kick missed (Drive: 7 plays, 75 yards, 2:08; Oklahoma State 37–26)
- (5:39) MIA — Mike Harley 5 yard pass from N'Kosi Perry, Marshall Few 2-point conversion rush (Drive: 10 plays, 75 yards, 4:16; Oklahoma State 37–34)

=== Statistics ===
Statistics	OKST	MIA
First downs	29	27
Plays–yards	83–418	78–512
Rushes–yards	43–113	30–156
Passing yards	305	356
Passing: comp–att–int	27–40–0	30–48–0
Time of possession	33:46	26:14

Team	Category	Player	Statistics
Oklahoma State	Passing	Spencer Sanders	27-for-40, 305 yards, 4 TD
Oklahoma State	Rushing	Spencer Sanders	45 yards on 13 carries
Oklahoma State	Receiving	Brennan Presley	118 yards on 6 receptions, 3 TD
Miami	Passing	N'Kosi Perry	19-for-34, 228 yards, 2 TD
Miami	Rushing	Cam'Ron Harris	52 yards on 6 carries, 1 TD
Miami	Receiving	Brevin Jordan	96 yards on 8 receptions, 2 TD

== See also ==
- 2021 Citrus Bowl, played at the same venue three days later
- 2020 Cure Bowl, played at the same venue three days earlier
- 2019 Cheez-It Bowl, the prior so-named bowl game, played at Chase Field in Phoenix, Arizona
