= 2021 Hula Bowl =

American college football all-star game

- 75th Hula Bowl
Team Aina	Team Kai
13	15
Head coach: Mike Singletary	Head coach: Rex Ryan
	1	2	3	4	Total
Team Aina	7	0	0	6	13
Team Kai	0	6	9	0	15
- Date: January 31, 2021
- Season: 2020
- Stadium: Aloha Stadium
- Location: Honolulu, Hawaii
- MVP: See #Awards
- National anthem: Sabrina McKenna
- Referee: Steve Strimling (Pac-12)
- Halftime show: Halau Manaola
- Attendance: 0

United States TV coverage
- Network: CBS Sports Network
- Announcers: Kanoa Leahy (play-by-play), Brian Baldinger (color), Ian Scheuring & Kainoa Carlson (sidelines)

The 2021 Hula Bowl was a post-season college football all-star game played on January 31, 2021, with kickoff at 4:30 p.m. HST (9:30 p.m. EST), at Aloha Stadium in Honolulu, Hawaii. The game was the last of the 2020–21 bowl games and, while not restricted to FBS players, the final game of the 2020 FBS football season. Television coverage was provided by CBS Sports Network. The game was played without fans in attendance, as Aloha Stadium was "deemed unsafe to hold crowds" in December 2020.

On January 22, organizers announced that Rex Ryan would coach the Kai team, and Mike Singletary would coach the Aina team; both have served as head coaches in the National Football League (NFL). They named as their offensive coordinators former NFL quarterback Mark Sanchez for Kai and former NFL quarterback and head coach Jim Zorn for Aina. For team KAI Ronnie Jones was selected to be the Defensive Coordinator Coach and for team AINA former NFL player Abe Elimimian was selected to be the Defensive Back Coach.

== Players ==
Player invitations were determined by the Hula Bowl Selection Committee, primarily based on "potential to make a professional Football team roster". Players were expected from "several levels of the NCAA as well as athletes from Japan, Canada, Australia, and Polynesia."

A list of accepted invites was maintained on the bowl's website. Notable players included K. J. Costello (QB, Mississippi State) and Brady White (QB, Memphis).

== Game ==
Team Aina was uniformed in red, and Team Kai in blue. The game utilized NFL rules, with some modifications—for example, all kicks and punts were fielded only via fair catch. Due to the fair catch requirement, no onside kick could be attempted, but in its place the "kicking" team could attempt essentially a 4th-and-15 from their own 30-yard-line. This occurred once in the game, late in the 4th quarter after Team Aina scored on a pick six, but the attempt did not result in a first down.

=== Awards ===
An offensive and defensive MVP were named for each team. For Team Aina, the MVPs were running back Mekhi Sargent (Iowa) and defensive end Carlo Kemp (Michigan). For Team Kai, the MVPs were running back C. J. Marable (Coastal Carolina) and cornerback Nick McCloud (Notre Dame). Offensively, Sargent had 61 yards on six rushes plus an 18-yard reception, while Marable had five carries for 17 yards including a touchdown; defensively, Kemp had four tackles and returned an interception for a touchdown, while McCloud had two interceptions with 34 return yards.

2021 Hula Bowl

Quarter	1	2	3	4	Total
Aina	7	0	0	6	13
Kai	0	6	9	0	15

at Aloha Stadium • Honolulu, Hawaii

- Date: Sunday, January 31, 2021
- Game time: 9:30 p.m. EST (4:30 p.m. HST)
- Game weather: Mostly clear • Temperature: 79 °F (26 °C) • Wind 14 mph (23 km/h)
- Game attendance: 0
- Referee: Steve Strimling (Pac-12)
- TV: CBS Sports Network

Game information

First quarter

- (1:06) AINA — David Moore (Central Michigan) 1-yard rush, Chris Naggar (SMU) kick (Drive: 11 plays, 90 yards, 7:53; Aina 7–0)

Second quarter

- (10:52) KAI — David Cote (Laval, Quebec) 32-yard field goal (Drive: 11 plays, 62 yards, 5:17; Aina 7–3)
- (2:35) KAI — David Cote 33-yard field goal (Drive: 5 plays, 22 yards, 2:19; Aina 7–6)

Third quarter

- (9:12) KAI — C. J. Marable (Coastal Carolina) 2-yard rush, David Cote kick hit upright (Drive: 6 plays, 67 yards, 3:22; Kai 12–7)
- (3:22) KAI — David Cote 24-yard field goal (Kai 15–7)

Fourth quarter

- (1:48) AINA — Carlo Kemp (Michigan) 64-yard interception return; 2-point conversion pass incomplete (Kai 15–13)

== See also ==
- 2021 NFL draft
