= 2020 Tulsa Golden Hurricane football team =

American college football season

2020 Tulsa Golden Hurricane football

AAC Championship Game, L 24–27 vs. Cincinnati

Armed Forces Bowl, L 26–28 vs. Mississippi State
- Conference: American Athletic Conference
- West Division
- Record: 6–3 (6–0 AAC)
- Head coach: Philip Montgomery (6th season)
- Offensive scheme: Veer and shoot
- Defensive coordinator: Joe Gillespie (2nd season)
- Base defense: 3–3–5
- Home stadium: Skelly Field at H. A. Chapman Stadium

2020 American Athletic Conference football standings
	Conf.			Overall
Team	W		L	W		L
No. 8 Cincinnati y$	6	–	0	9	–	1
Tulsa y	6	–	0	6	–	3
Memphis	5	–	3	8	–	3
UCF	5	–	3	6	–	4
SMU	4	–	3	7	–	3
Houston	3	–	3	3	–	5
Navy	3	–	4	3	–	7
Tulane	3	–	5	6	–	6
East Carolina	3	–	5	3	–	6
Temple	1	–	6	1	–	6
South Florida	0	–	7	1	–	8
Championship: Cincinnati 27, Tulsa 24
$ – Conference champion; y – Championship game participant; Rankings from AP Poll.

The 2020 Tulsa Golden Hurricane football team represented the University of Tulsa in the 2020 NCAA Division I FBS football season. The Golden Hurricane played their home games at Skelly Field at H. A. Chapman Stadium in Tulsa, Oklahoma, and competed in the American Athletic Conference. They were led by sixth-year head coach Philip Montgomery.

== Schedule ==
The Golden Hurricane had games scheduled against Toledo, Northwestern State, Arkansas State, and Houston, which were canceled due to the COVID-19 pandemic. The game between Tulsa and Cincinnati was originally scheduled to take place on October 17, however, due to COVID-19 management requirements in response to positive tests and subsequent quarantine of individuals within the Cincinnati program, the game was rescheduled for December 5. On December 8, 2020 – The American Athletic Conference has announced that the regular-season football game between Cincinnati and Tulsa, scheduled for Saturday, Dec. 12, will not be played due to positive COVID-19 cases at Cincinnati. The regular-season game will not be rescheduled. Cincinnati and Tulsa are scheduled to meet Saturday, Dec. 19, in the American Athletic Conference Championship Game. In the absence of a regular-season head-to-head result to break the tie, the site of the championship game will be the home stadium of the team that is ranked higher in the Dec. 8 College Football Playoff rankings

Date	Time	Opponent	Rank	Site	TV	Result	Attendance
September 19	11:00 a.m.	at No. 11 Oklahoma State*		Boone Pickens Stadium; Stillwater, OK (rivalry)	ESPN	L 7–16	14,668
October 3	6:30 p.m.	at No. 11 UCF		Bounce House; Orlando, FL	ESPN2	W 34–26	8,874
October 23	6:30 p.m.	at South Florida		Raymond James Stadium; Tampa, FL	ESPN	W 42–13	5,142
October 30	8:00 p.m.	East Carolina		Skelly Field at H. A. Chapman Stadium; Tulsa, OK	ESPN2	W 34–30	3,000
November 14	6:00 p.m.	No. 19 SMU		Skelly Field at H. A. Chapman Stadium; Tulsa, OK	ESPN2	W 28–24	3,000
November 19	6:30 p.m.	Tulane	No. 25	Skelly Field at H. A. Chapman Stadium; Tulsa, OK	ESPN	W 30–24 ^{2OT}	3,000
December 5	2:30 p.m.	at Navy	No. 24	Navy–Marine Corps Memorial Stadium; Annapolis, MD	ESPN2	W 19–6	0
December 19	7:00 p.m.	at No. 9 Cincinnati	No. 23	Nippert Stadium; Cincinnati, OH (American Athletic Conference Championship)	ABC	L 24–27	5,831
December 31	11:00 a.m.	vs. Mississippi State*	No. 24	Amon G. Carter Stadium; Fort Worth, TX (Armed Forces Bowl)	ESPN	L 26–28	9,000
*Non-conference game; Rankings from AP Poll and CFP Rankings (after November 24) released prior to game; All times are in Central time

== Game summaries ==
=== At Oklahoma State ===
Tulsa Golden Hurricane (0–0) vs. No. 11 Oklahoma State Cowboys (0–0)

Quarter	1	2	3	4	Total
Tulsa	0	7	0	0	7
No. 11 Oklahoma State	3	0	0	13	16

at Boone Pickens Stadium • Stillwater, OK

- Date: Saturday, September 19, 2020
- Game time: 11:00 a.m. CDT
- Game weather: Sunny Temperature: 65°F
- Game attendance: 14,668
- Referee: Adam Savoie
- TV announcers (ESPN): Sean McDonough (play-by-play), Todd Blackledge (analyst), Todd McShay (sideline), and Kris Budden (sideline)

Game information

First Quarter

- OSU – 05:13 – Alex Hale 27-yard field goal

Second Quarter

- TU – 01:38 – Josh Johnson 16-yard pass from Zach Smith (Tyler Tipton kick)

Third Quarter

- No Scoring

Fourth Quarter

- OSU – 14:56 – Chuba Hubbard 3-yard rush (Hale kick)
- OSU – 04:27 – Hale 40-yard field goal
- OSU – 00:18 – Hale 29-yard field goal

Statistics	TU	OSU
First downs	15	19
Total yards	278	279
Rushing yards	112	141
Passing yards	166	138
Turnovers	1	2
Time of possession	29:27	30:33

Team	Category	Player	Statistics
Tulsa	Passing	Zach Smith	18/28, 166 yards, 1 TD, 1 INT
Tulsa	Rushing	Deneric Prince	14 carries, 82 yards
Tulsa	Receiving	Josh Johnson	5 receptions, 63 yards, 1 TD
Oklahoma State	Passing	Shane Illingworth	4/5, 74 yards
Oklahoma State	Rushing	Chuba Hubbard	27 carries, 93 yards, 1 TD
Oklahoma State	Receiving	Tylan Wallace	4 receptions, 94 yards

=== At UCF ===
Tulsa Golden Hurricane (0–1) vs. No. 11 UCF Knights (2–0)

Quarter	1	2	3	4	Total
Tulsa	2	10	13	9	34
No. 11 UCF	16	7	3	0	26

at Bounce House • Orlando, FL

- Date: Saturday, October 3, 2020
- Game time: 6:30 p.m. CDT
- TV announcers (ESPN2): Jason Benetti (play-by-play), Rod Gilmore (analyst), and Lericia Harris (sideline)

Game information

First Quarter

- UCF – 10:13 – Jacob Harris 12-yard pass from Dillon Gabriel (Daniel Obarski kick)
- UCF – 07:35 – Team Safety
- UCF – 06:58 – Otis Anderson Jr. 49-yard rush (Obarski kick)
- TU – 02:16 – Team Safety

Second Quarter

- TU – 11:41 – Zack Long 20-yard field goal
- UCF – 01:39 – Cole Schneider 1-yard rush (Obarski kick)
- TU – 00:53 – Josh Johnson 48-yard pass from Zach Smith (Long kick)

Third Quarter

- TU – 14:49 – Sam Crawford Jr. 34-yard pass from Smith (Long kick)
- UCF – 11:16 – Obarski 26-yard field goal
- TU – 07:20 – T.K. Wilkerson 2-yard rush (kick failed)

Fourth Quarter

- TU – 12:56 – Keylon Stokes 13-yard pass from Smith (pass failed)
- TU – 01:30 – Long 34-yard field goal

Statistics	TU	UCF
First downs	21	23
Total yards	438	455
Rushing yards	165	125
Passing yards	273	330
Turnovers	3	3
Time of possession	30:34	29:26

Team	Category	Player	Statistics
Tulsa	Passing	Zach Smith	17/29, 273 yards, 3 TD, 1 INT
Tulsa	Rushing	T.K. Wilkerson	22 carries, 86 yards, 1 TD
Tulsa	Receiving	Keylon Stokes	6 receptions, 95 yards, 1 TD
UCF	Passing	Dillon Gabriel	28/51, 330 yards, 1 TD, 1 INT
UCF	Rushing	Otis Anderson Jr.	17 carries, 84 yards, 1 TD
UCF	Receiving	Jaylon Robinson	3 receptions, 111 yards

=== At South Florida ===
Tulsa Golden Hurricane (1–1) vs. South Florida Bulls (1–4)

Quarter	1	2	3	4	Total
Tulsa	7	14	21	0	42
South Florida	6	0	7	0	13

at Raymond James Stadium • Tampa, FL

- Date: Friday, October 23, 2020
- Game time: 6:30 p.m. CDT
- Game attendance: 5,142
- Referee: Charles Lamerti
- TV announcers (ESPN): Jason Benetti (play–by–play), Andre Ware (analyst), and Paul Carcaterra (sideline reporter)

Game information

First Quarter

- TU – 12:10 – JuanCarlos Santana 33-yard pass from Zach Smith (Zack Long kick)
- USF – 09:59 – Jared Sackett 39-yard field goal
- USF – 06:57 – Sackett 25-yard field goal

Second Quarter

- TU – 12:23 – Corey Taylor II 5-yard rush (Long kick)
- TU – 04:54 – Deneric Prince 27-yard rush (Long kick)

Third Quarter

- USF – 08:43 – Bryce Miller 4-yard pass from Noah Johnson (Sackett kick)
- TU – 07:26 – Prince 62-yard rush (Long kick)
- TU – 05:56 – Zaven Collins 38-yard Interception return (Long kick)
- TU – 02:21 – Taylor 1-yard rush (Long kick)

Fourth Quarter

- No Scoring

Statistics	TU	USF
First downs	21	17
Total yards	462	305
Rushing yards	227	122
Passing yards	235	183
Turnovers	1	3
Time of possession	28:33	31:27

Team	Category	Player	Statistics
Tulsa	Passing	Zach Smith	16/24, 233 yards, 1 TD, 1 INT
Tulsa	Rushing	Deneric Prince	15 carries, 109 yards, 2 TD
Tulsa	Receiving	Sam Crawford Jr.	4 receptions, 82 yards
South Florida	Passing	Noah Johnson	18/27, 150 yards, 1 TD, 1 INT
South Florida	Rushing	Cade Fortin	4 carries, 39 yards
South Florida	Receiving	Omarion Dollison	6 receptions, 54 yards

=== East Carolina ===
Tulsa Golden Hurricane (2–1) vs. East Carolina Pirates (1–3)

Quarter	1	2	3	4	Total
East Carolina	7	10	3	10	30
Tulsa	3	0	17	14	34

at Skelly Field at H. A. Chapman Stadium • Tulsa, OK

- Date: Friday, October 30, 2020
- Game time: 8:00 p.m. CDT
- Game weather: 53 °F (12 °C) • Weather: Clear • Wind: SSW 5 MPH
- Game attendance: 0
- Referee: A. Calabarese
- TV announcers (ESPN2): Clay Matvick (play–by–play) and Rocky Boiman (analyst)

Game information

First Quarter

- ECU – 11:08 – Tyler Snead 16-yard pass from Holton Ahlers (Jake Verity kick)
- TU – 03:35 – Zack Long 35-yard field goal

Second Quarter

- ECU – 10:42 – C.J. Johnson 25-yard pass from Ahlers (Verity kick)
- ECU – 01:58 – Verity 46-yard field goal

Third Quarter

- TU – 13:23 – Keylon Stokes 25-yard pass from Zach Smith (Long kick)
- ECU – 09:15 – Verity 22-yard field goal
- TU – 06:19 – T.K. Wilkerson 13-yard rush (Long kick)
- TU – 04:15 – Long 21-yard field goal

Fourth Quarter

- ECU – 12:34 – Verity 38-yard field goal
- TU – 09:14 – JuanCarlos Santana 39-yard pass from Smith (Long kick)
- ECU – 04:24 – Rahjai Harris 4-yard pass from Ahlers (Verity kick)
- TU – 00:29 – Wilkerson 1-yard rush (Long kick)

Statistics	TU	ECU
First downs	25	27
Total yards	428	456
Rushing yards	175	126
Passing yards	253	330
Turnovers	3	3
Time of possession	24:51	35:09

Team	Category	Player	Statistics
Tulsa	Passing	Zach Smith	19/37, 253 yards, 2 TD, 2 INT
Tulsa	Rushing	T.K. Wilkerson	18 carries, 89 yards, 2 TD
Tulsa	Receiving	Keylon Stokes	6 receptions, 90 yards, 1 TD
East Carolina	Passing	Holton Ahlers	38/50, 330 yards, 3 TD, 1 INT
East Carolina	Rushing	Rahjai Harris	21 carries, 118 yards
East Carolina	Receiving	Tyler Snead	16 receptions, 108 yards, 1 TD

=== SMU ===
Tulsa Golden Hurricane (3–1) vs. No. 19 SMU Mustangs (7–1)

Quarter	1	2	3	4	Total
No. 19 SMU	14	10	0	0	24
Tulsa	0	7	7	14	28

at Skelly Field at H. A. Chapman Stadium • Tulsa, OK

- Date: Saturday, November 14, 2020
- Game time: 6:00 p.m. CST
- Game attendance: 3,000
- TV announcers (ESPN2): Anish Shroff (play-by-play), Tom Luginbill (analyst), and Ian Fitzsimmons (sideline)

Game information

First Quarter

- SMU – 10:47 – Brandon Crossley 18-yard Interception return (Chris Naggar kick)
- SMU – 08:19 – Kylen Granson 22-yard pass from Shane Buechele (Naggar kick)

Second Quarter

- SMU – 14:58 – Ulysses Bentley IV 1-yard rush (Naggar kick)
- TU – 06:15 – Josh Johnson 20-yard pass from Zach Smith (Zack Long kick)
- SMU – 02:37 – Naggar 45-yard field goal

Third Quarter

- TU – 02:51 – T.K. Wilkerson 1-yard rush (Long kick)

Fourth Quarter

- TU – 13:31 – Johnson 35-yard pass from Smith (Long kick)
- TU – 02:11 – James Palmer 4-yard pass from Smith (Long kick)

Statistics	TU	SMU
First downs	27	25
Total yards	455	351
Rushing yards	130	151
Passing yards	325	200
Turnovers	2	1
Time of possession	29:18	30:42

Team	Category	Player	Statistics
Tulsa	Passing	Zach Smith	26/38, 325 yards, 3 TD, 1 INT
Tulsa	Rushing	T.K. Wilkerson	21 carries, 94 yards, 1 TD
Tulsa	Receiving	Keylon Stokes	8 receptions, 122 yards
SMU	Passing	Shane Buechele	18/36, 200 yards, 1 TD, 1 INT
SMU	Rushing	Ulysses Bentley IV	26 carries, 103 yards, 1 TD
SMU	Receiving	Danny Gray	8 receptions, 93 yards

=== Tulane ===
No. 25 Tulsa Golden Hurricane (4–1) vs. Tulane Green Wave (5–4)

Quarter	1	2	3	4	OT	2OT	Total
Tulane	0	0	14	7	3	0	24
No. 25 Tulsa	0	0	0	21	3	6	30

at Skelly Field at H. A. Chapman Stadium • Tulsa, OK

- Date: Thursday November 19, 2020
- Game time: 6:30 p.m. CST
- Game weather: 69 °F (21 °C) • Weather: Clear • Wind: S 14 MPH
- Game attendance: 0
- Referee: Edwin Lee
- TV announcers (ESPN): Matt Barrie (play–by–play), Mike Golic Jr. (analyst), and Kris Budden (sideline reporter)

Game information

First Quarter

- No Scoring

Second Quarter

- No Scoring

Third Quarter

- TULANE – 05:25 – Stephon Huderson 5-yard rush (Merek Glover kick)
- TULANE – 03:07 – Will Wallace 27-yard pass from Michael Pratt (Glover kick)

Fourth Quarter

- TULSA – 09:17 – Davis Brin 18-yard rush (Zack Long kick)
- TULSA – 03:16 – Josh Johnson 19-yard pass from Brin (Long kick)
- TULANE – 01:38 – Tyrick James 19-yard pass from Pratt (Glover kick)
- TULSA – 00:00 – JuanCarlos Santana 37-yard pass from Brin (Long kick)

Overtime

- TULSA – Long 27-yard field goal
- TULANE – Glover 39-yard field goal
- TULSA – Zaven Collins 96-yard Interception return

Statistics	TULSA	TULANE
First downs	18	26
Total yards	302	522
Rushing yards	226	179
Passing yards	76	343
Turnovers	1	3
Time of possession	29:20	30:40

Team	Category	Player	Statistics
Tulsa	Passing	Davis Brin	18/28, 266 yards, 2 TD
Tulsa	Rushing	Corey Taylor II	19 carries, 132 yards
Tulsa	Receiving	JuanCarlos Santana	8 receptions, 138 yards, 1 TD
Tulane	Passing	Michael Pratt	8/17, 76 yards, 2 TD, 1 INT
Tulane	Rushing	Stephon Huderson	24 carries, 98 yards, 1 TD
Tulane	Receiving	Will Wallace	2 receptions, 34 yards, 1 TD

=== At Navy ===
No. 24 Tulsa Golden Hurricane (5–1) vs. Navy Midshipmen (3–5)

Quarter	1	2	3	4	Total
No. 24 Tulsa	0	6	7	6	19
Navy	0	3	3	0	6

at Navy–Marine Corps Memorial Stadium • Annapolis, MD

- Date: Saturday, December 5, 2020
- Game time: 2:30 p.m. CST
- Game weather: Temperature: 48 °F (9 °C) • Wind: NW 15–20 mph • Weather: Overcast, Breezy
- Game attendance: 0
- Referee: Henry Johns
- TV announcers (ESPN2): Anish Shroff (play-by-play), Tom Luginbill (analyst), and Alex Chappell (sideline)
- ESPN – No. 24 Tulsa Golden Hurricane at Navy Midshipmen

Game information

First Quarter

- No Scoring

Second Quarter

- TU – 11:58 – Zack Long 48-yard field goal
- TU – 03:22 – Long 25-yard field goal
- NAVY – 00:00 – Bijan Nichols 34-yard field goal

Third Quarter

- NAVY – 07:08 – Nichols 32-yard field goal
- TU – 01:33 – Josh Johnson 66-yard pass from Zach Smith (Long kick)

Fourth Quarter

- TU – 10:58 – Long 37-yard field goal
- TU – 02:54 – Long 36-yard field goal

Statistics	TU	Navy
First downs	15	13
Total yards	296	153
Rushing yards	128	126
Passing yards	168	27
Turnovers	1	1
Time of possession	27:40	32:20

Team	Category	Player	Statistics
Tulsa	Passing	Zach Smith	10/25, 168 yards, 1 TD
Tulsa	Rushing	Corey Taylor II	19 carries, 69 yards
Tulsa	Receiving	Josh Johnson	3 receptions, 76 yards, 1 TD
Navy	Passing	Xavier Arline	4/8, 27 yards
Navy	Rushing	Xavier Arline	27 carries, 60 yards
Navy	Receiving	Mark Walker	3 receptions, 29 yards

=== At Cincinnati (AAC Championship Game) ===
2020 American Athletic Conference Football Championship Game

Quarter	1	2	3	4	Total
#23 Tulsa	0	10	7	7	24
#9 Cincinnati	10	7	7	3	27

at Nippert Stadium
Cincinnati, OH

- Date: Saturday, December 19, 2020
- Game time: 7:00 p.m. CST
- Game weather: 41 °F (5 °C) • Weather: Drizzling • Wind: S 6 mph
- Game attendance: 5,831
- Referee: Charles Lamertina
- TV announcers (ABC;): Joe Tessitore (play-by-play), Greg McElroy (analyst), and Holly Rowe (sideline)

Game information

First Quarter

- UC – 08:56 – Jerome Ford 42-yard rush (Cole Smith kick)
- UC – 00:05 – Smith 25-yard field goal

Second Quarter

- TU – 11:08 – Zack Long 43-yard field goal
- TU – 08:36 – Corey Taylor II 10-yard rush (Long kick)
- UC – 03:17 – Alec Pierce 36-yard pass from Desmond Ridder (Smith kick)

Third Quarter

- TU – 10:05 – Deneric Prince 8-yard rush (Long kick)
- UC – 07:14 – Ridder 10-yard rush (Smith kick)

Fourth Quarter

- TU – 03:41 – JuanCarlos Santana 13-yard pass from Zach Smith (Long kick)
- UC – 00:00 – Smith 34-yard field goal

Statistics	TU	UC
First downs	22	17
Total yards	365	420
Rushing yards	199	151
Passing yards	166	269
Turnovers	2	2
Time of possession	26:03	33:57

Team	Category	Player	Statistics
Tulsa	Passing	Zach Smith	13/30, 166 yards, 1 TD, 2 INT
Tulsa	Rushing	Corey Taylor II	22 carries, 102 yards, 1 TD
Tulsa	Receiving	Sam Crawford Jr.	3 receptions, 79 yards
Cincinnati	Passing	Desmond Ridder	19/29, 269 yards, 1 TD
Cincinnati	Rushing	Desmond Ridder	16 carries, 83 yards, 1 TD
Cincinnati	Receiving	Alec Pierce	5 receptions, 146 yards, 1 TD

=== Vs. Mississippi State (Armed Forces Bowl) ===
2020 Lockheed Martin Armed Forces Bowl

Quarter	1	2	3	4	Total
#24 Tulsa	0	6	7	13	26
Mississippi State	7	0	14	7	28

at Amon G. Carter Stadium • Fort Worth, Texas

- Date: Thursday, December 31, 2020
- Game time: 12:00 p.m. EST (11:00 a.m. CST)
- Game weather: Rain • Temperature: 37 °F (3 °C) • Wind: NNE 16 mph
- Referee: Jeff Servinski (Big Ten)
- TV announcers (ESPN/1stTm): Chris Cotter (play-by-play), Mark Herzlich (analyst), and Ian Fitzsimmons (sideline)/Brian Estridge (play-by-play) and Elvis Gallegos (analyst)
- ESPN game summary

Game information

First quarter

- (13:41) MSST – Jo'Quavious Marks 28 yard rush, Jace Christmann kick (Drive: 3 plays, 39 yards, 1:19; Mississippi State 7–0)

Second quarter

- (11:15) TLSA – Zack Long 27 yard field goal (Drive: 11 plays, 72 yards, 4:07; Mississippi State 7–3)
- (2:34) TLSA – Zack Long 33 yard field goal (Drive: 11 plays, 78 yards, 4:51; Mississippi State 7–6)

Third quarter

- (9:04) MSST – Will Rogers 13 yard rush, Jace Christmann kick (Drive: 9 plays, 64 yards, 5:17; Mississippi State 14–6)
- (6:37) TLSA – Deneric Prince 14 yard rush, Zack Long kick (Drive: 7 plays, 75 yards, 2:27; Mississippi State 14–13)
- (3:29) MSST – Emmanuel Forbes 90 yard interception return, Jace Christmann kick (Mississippi State 21–13)

Fourth quarter

- (12:30) TLSA – Corey Taylor II 5 yard rush, 2-point pass failed (Drive: 9 plays, 32 yards, 3:11; Mississippi State 21–19)
- (8:01) MSST – Lideatrick Griffin 13 yard pass from Will Rogers, Jace Christmann kick (Drive: 11 plays, 65 yards, 4:29; Mississippi State 28–19)
- (1:23) TLSA – Keylon Stokes 15 yard pass from Zach Smith, Zack Long kick (Drive: 6 plays, 55 yards, 1:31; Mississippi State 28–26)

==== Statistics ====
Statistics	TLSA	MSST
First downs	27	16
Plays–yards	86–484	60–271
Rushes–yards	40–137	30–123
Passing yards	347	148
Passing: comp–att–int	26–46–2	19–30–0
Time of possession	31:19	28:41

Team	Category	Player	Statistics
Tulsa	Passing	Zach Smith	26/46, 347 yards, 1 TD, 2 INT
Tulsa	Rushing	Corey Taylor II	20 carries, 85 yards, 1 TD
Tulsa	Receiving	Keylon Stokes	9 receptions, 117 yards, 1 TD
Mississippi State	Passing	Will Rogers	19/30, 148 yards, 1 TD
Mississippi State	Rushing	Jo'Quavious Marks	11 carries, 72 yards, 1 TD
Mississippi State	Receiving	Austin Williams	3 receptions, 42 yards

== Roster ==
2020 Tulsa Golden Hurricane football team roster
Players
Coaches
Offense

Pos.	#	Name	Class
WR	1	Josh Stewart	RSr
WR	2	Keylon Stokes	Sr
RB	3	Shamari Brooks	Sr
WR	4	Jalen Paxton	Fr
WR	5	JuanCarlos Santana	RJr
RB	6	Christian Lovick	RFr
QB	7	Davis Brin	RSo
RB	8	Deneric Prince	RSo
WR	9	Sam Crawford Jr.	RJr
QB	10	Roman Fuller	Fr
QB	11	Zach Smith	RSr
QB	12	Seth Boomer	RJr
WR	13	Josh Johnson	RJr
QB	15	Brandon Marquardt	RJr
QB	16	Carson Collins	RFr
WR	18	La'Darrion Florez	RFr
TE	19	Grayson Boomer	RFr
WR	20	Cannon Montgomery	RJr
RB	21	T.K. Wilkerson	RSo
WR	22	Malachai Jones	Fr
RB	23	Anthony Watkins	RFr
RB	24	Corey Taylor II	RSr
WR	25	Dhailon Phillips	RJr
WR	28	Corbin Daniels	Fr
TE	32	James Palmer	RSo
WR	35	Hanan Jones	RFr
TE	38	Abe Anderson	RJr
WR	44	Dillon McCoy	Fr
TE	47	Ethan Hall	RFr
OL	50	Gabe Cantu	Fr
OL	52	James Middleton	Jr
OL	56	Tyler Smith	RFr
OL	60	Isaiah Wright	RFr
C	66	Gerard Wheeler	RJr
OL	68	Tiller Bucktrot	RSr
OL	71	Chris Paul	RJr
OL	72	Dillon Wade	Fr
OL	73	Dylan Couch	RSr
OL	74	Jeremy Jones	RFr
OL	75	Dante Bivens	RJr
OL	76	Chester Baah	RFr
OL	77	Bryce Bray	So
OL	79	Jaden Muskrat	Fr
TE	80	Bayne Tryon	Fr
WR	82	Joseph Breedlove III	RJr
WR	84	Malik Rodgers	RSo
TE	85	JD Crowder	RFr
WR	86	Kamdyn Benjamin	RFr
TE	87	Jacob Kainer	Jr
WR	88	Kemani Brown	Fr
WR	89	Tyler Burton	Fr

Defense

Pos.	#	Name	Class
CB	0	Tyon Davis	RJr
S	1	Kendarin Ray	RSo
S	3	Cristian Williams	RSr
LB	4	Robert Revels III	RSr
CB	5	Ryan Nixon	RSo
S	7	TieNeal Martin	RSr
LB	8	Brian Johnson	RSo
S	10	Sean O'Keefe	Fr
LB	11	Treyvon Reeves	RSr
CB	12	Allie Green IV	Sr
S	13	Lamar Mullins	RJr
CB	15	Reggie Ellis	RFr
LB	16	Deante Betts	Fr
S	18	Brad Hensley	RFr
LB	19	Grant Sawyer	Jr
S	20	LJ Wallace	RSo
S	21	Bryson Powers	RJr
LB	23	Zaven Collins	RJr
CB	24	Damarco Williams	Fr
S	25	Jaise Oliver	RFr
CB	26	Akayleb Evans	RJr
S	27	Daiquain Jackson	RJr
S	28	Jett Hendrix	RSo
S	29	Mike Garrett Jr.	RJr
LB	30	Justin Wright	RSo
S	32	Rico Windham	Fr
CB	34	Kaylon Washington	Fr
LB	35	Yohance Burnett	RSr
S	37	Hunter Rangel	RFr
S	38	Lawson Howard	RFr
LB	40	Mitchell Kulkin	RSo
LB	41	Dorian Hopkins	RFr
DL	44	Joseph Anderson	RSo
LB	46	Bershard Glaspie	RFr
LB	47	Daniel Giddens II	Fr
LB	49	Xander Redar	Fr
LB	53	Sam Clayton	RFr
LB	54	Trevor Reh	RFr
DL	58	Deven Lamp	RJr
DL	88	RaQuan Thompson	RFr
DL	90	Jaxon Player	Jr
DL	91	Cullen Wick	RSr
DL	92	Darrias Murdock	RFr
DL	93	Bryce Alonso	Jr
DL	94	Anthony Goodlow	RSo
DL	95	Cooper Laake	RFr
DL	96	Vincent Ume-Ezeoke	RFr
DL	97	Tyarise Stevenson	RSr
DL	98	Haydon Grant	Fr
DL	99	Everitt Rogers	Fr

Special teams

Pos.	#	Name	Class
P	37	Lachlan Wilson	RFr
LS	42	Adam Higuera	Sr
K	43	Tyler Tipton	Fr
K	90	Zack Long	Sr
K	95	Alex Haight	Fr
K	98	Kevin Neitzke	RSr

Head coach

- Philip Montgomery (Tarleton State)

Coordinators/assistant coaches

- Joseph Gillespie (Angelo State)
  Defensive coordinator, linebackers
- Jermial Ashley (Kansas)
  Defensive line coach
- Carlton Buckels (LSU)
  Safeties coach
- Aaron Fletcher (East Texas A&M)
  Cornerbacks coach
- Zach Hanson (Houston)
  Offensive line coach
- Justin Hill (Rice)
  Running backs coach
- Calvin Lowry (Penn State)
  Receivers coach
- Luke Olson (Southern Nazarene)
  Nickel safeties coach
- Jordan Najvar (Baylor)
  Tight ends coach
- Beau Trahan (Texas)
  Quarterbacks coach
- Grant Lester (Oklahoma)
  Offensive quality control
- Craig Suits (Tulsa)
  Defensive quality control
- Brody Trahan (Baylor)
  Quality control special teams & recruiting
- Mookie Carlile
  Defensive graduate assistant
- Nick Franey
  Offensive graduate assistant
- Ravi Savitala (UC Santa Cruz)
  Co-director of football operations/external
- Diane McPheeters (Baylor)
  Co-director of football operations/internal
- Dan Bitson (Tulsa)
  Director of player personnel & development
- Keith Smith (Shepherd University)
  Director of football video operations
- Tom Ososkie
  Director of scouting
- Sam Lazarus (Tulsa)
  Director of creative media

Legend

- (C) Team captain
- (S) Suspended
- (I) Ineligible
- Injured
- Redshirt

Roster

== Players drafted into the NFL ==
The following Golden Hurricane player was selected in the 2021 NFL draft following the season.

Round	Pick	Player	Position	NFL club
1	16	Zaven Collins	Linebacker	Arizona Cardinals

== Media ==
99.5 Big Country is the Official Flagship Station of the University of Tulsa Golden Hurricane football team.

Radio affiliates

- KXBL – 99.5 FM | Tulsa
- KRIG – 104.9 FM | Bartlesville
- KWON – 1400 AM | Bartlesville!
- KCRC – 1390 AM | Enid
- KTMC – 1400 AM/96.7 FM | McAlester
- KOKL – 1240 AM | Okmulgee

! Coaches show
