= 2020 Kentucky Wildcats football team =

American college football season

2020 Kentucky Wildcats football

Gator Bowl champion

Gator Bowl, W 23–21 vs. NC State
- Conference: Southeastern Conference
- Eastern Division
- Record: 5–6 (4–6 SEC)
- Head coach: Mark Stoops (8th season)
- Offensive coordinator: Eddie Gran (5th season)
- Co-offensive coordinator: Darin Hinshaw (5th season)
- Offensive scheme: Spread
- Defensive coordinator: Brad White (2nd season)
- Base defense: 3–4 or 4–3
- Home stadium: Kroger Field

2020 Southeastern Conference football standings
	Conf.			Overall
Team	W		L	W		L
Eastern Division
No. 13 Florida x	8	–	2	8	–	4
No. 7 Georgia	7	–	2	8	–	2
Missouri	5	–	5	5	–	5
Kentucky	4	–	6	5	–	6
Tennessee*	3	–	7	3	–	7
South Carolina	2	–	8	2	–	8
Vanderbilt	0	–	9	0	–	9
Western Division
No. 1 Alabama x$#^	10	–	0	13	–	0
No. 4 Texas A&M	8	–	1	9	–	1
Auburn	6	–	4	6	–	5
LSU*	5	–	5	5	–	5
Ole Miss	4	–	5	5	–	5
Arkansas	3	–	7	3	–	7
Mississippi State	3	–	7	4	–	7
Championship: Alabama 52, Florida 46
# – College Football Playoff champion; ^ – College Football Playoff participant; $ – Conference champion; x – Division champion/co-champions; * – Tennessee vacated all wins due to NCAA violations. LSU was ineligible for postseason due to self imposed ban. Note: Due to COVID-19, the SEC played a conference-only schedule.; Rankings from AP Poll.

The 2020 Kentucky Wildcats football team represented the University of Kentucky in the 2020 NCAA Division I FBS football season. The Wildcats played their home games at Kroger Field in Lexington, Kentucky, and competed in the East Division of the Southeastern Conference (SEC). They were led by eighth-year head coach Mark Stoops.

== Preseason ==
=== SEC Media Days ===
In the preseason media poll, Kentucky was predicted to finish in fourth place in the East Division.

== Schedule ==
Kentucky had games scheduled against Eastern Illinois, Eastern Michigan, Kent State, and Louisville, which were all canceled due to the COVID-19 pandemic. This was the first season since 1993 that the Wildcats did not play Louisville. As of on October 16, 2020, the SEC swapped two teams and the dates of when they played the Wildcats. This is because of an outbreak of COVID-19 among other competing SEC football teams. Missouri was rescheduled to be an away game on October 24, instead of an away game on the 31st, and Georgia at home on October 31 instead of the 24th.

Date	Time	Opponent	Rank	Site	TV	Result	Attendance
September 26	12:00 p.m.	at No. 8 Auburn	No. 23	Jordan–Hare Stadium; Auburn, AL	SECN	L 13–29	17,490
October 3	4:00 p.m.	Ole Miss		Kroger Field; Lexington, KY	SECN	L 41–42 ^{OT}	12,000
October 10	7:30 p.m.	Mississippi State		Kroger Field; Lexington, KY	SECN	W 24–2	12,000
October 17	12:00 p.m.	at No. 18 Tennessee		Neyland Stadium; Knoxville, TN (rivalry)	SECN	W 34–7	22,519
October 24	4:00 p.m.	at Missouri		Faurot Field; Columbia, MO	SECN	L 10–20	11,738
October 31	12:00 p.m.	No. 5 Georgia		Kroger Field; Lexington, KY	SECN	L 3–14	12,000
November 14	12:00 p.m.	Vanderbilt		Kroger Field; Lexington, KY (rivalry)	SECN	W 38–35	12,000
November 21	4:00 p.m.	at No. 1 Alabama		Bryant–Denny Stadium; Tuscaloosa, AL	SECN	L 3–63	19,424
November 28	12:00 p.m.	at No. 6 Florida		Ben Hill Griffin Stadium; Gainesville, FL (rivalry)	ESPN	L 10–34	14,453
December 5	7:30 p.m.	South Carolina		Kroger Field; Lexington, KY	SECN	W 41–18	12,000
January 2, 2021	12:00 p.m.	vs. No. 23 NC State*		TIAA Bank Field; Jacksonville, FL (Gator Bowl)	ESPN	W 23–21	10,422
*Non-conference game; Rankings from AP Poll and CFP Rankings (after November 24) released prior to game; All times are in Central time

== Rankings ==
Ranking movements Legend: ██ Increase in ranking ██ Decrease in ranking RV = Received votes
	Week															
Poll	Pre	1	2	3	4	5	6	7	8	9	10	11	12	13	14	Final
AP	RV	RV*	23	23	RV											
Coaches	RV	RV*	20	RV	RV											
CFP	Not released															Not released

== Game summaries ==
=== At Auburn ===
No. 23 Kentucky vs. No. 8 Auburn

Quarter	1	2	3	4	Total
No. 23 Wildcats	7	0	6	0	13
No. 8 Tigers	8	0	7	14	29

at Jordan-Hare Stadium, Auburn, AL

- Date: September 26, 2020
- Game time: 12:00 p.m. EST
- Game weather: Cloudy • Temperature: 75 °F (24 °C) • Wind: 5 mph W
- Game attendance: 17,490
- Referee: Steve Marlowe
- TV announcers (SECN): Tom Hart (play-by-play), Jordan Rodgers (analyst), Cole Cubelic (sideline reporter)
- ESPN

Game information

First quarter

- (6:44) UK – Kavosiey Smoke 35 yd rush, Matt Ruffolo kick (Drive: 11 plays, 93 yds, 6:23; Kentucky 7–0)
- (4:30) AUB – D. J. Williams 1 yd rush, John Samuel Shenker pass (Drive: 7 plays, 70 yds, 2:07; Auburn 8–7)

Second quarter

No scoring

Third quarter

- (5:42) AUB – Seth Williams 11 yd pass from Bo Nix, Anders Carlson kick (Drive: 9 plays, 76 yds, 4:19; Auburn 15–7)
- (1:00) UK – Akeem Hayes 8 yd pass from Terry Wilson, Terry Wilson pass failed (Drive: 11 plays, 73 yds, 4:34; Auburn 15–13)

Fourth quarter

- (10:21) AUB – Seth Williams 4 yd pass from Bo Nix, Anders Carlson kick (Drive: 5 plays, 23 yds, 2:13; Auburn 22–13)
- (8:17) AUB – Eli Stove 21 yd pass from Bo Nix, Anders Carlson kick (Drive: 2 plays, 27 yds, 0:50; Auburn 29–13)

Statistics	UK	AUB
First downs	21	16
Plays–yards	78–384	57–324
Rushes–yards	40–145	30–91
Passing yards	239	233
Passing: comp–att–int	24–38–1	16–27–0
Time of possession	36:29	23:31

Team	Category	Player	Statistics
Kentucky	Passing	Terry Wilson	24/37, 239 yds, 1 TD, 1 INT
Kentucky	Rushing	Kavosiey Smoke	7 carries, 62 yds, 1 TD
Kentucky	Receiving	Josh Ali	9 receptions, 98 yds
Auburn	Passing	Bo Nix	16/27, 233 yds, 3 TD
Auburn	Rushing	Bo Nix	5 carries, 34 yds
Auburn	Receiving	Seth Williams	6 receptions, 112 yds, 2 TD

=== Ole Miss ===
Ole Miss vs. Kentucky

Quarter	1	2	3	4	Total
Rebels	7	7	7	21	42
Wildcats	14	7	7	13	41

at Kroger Field, Lexington, KY

- Date: October 3, 2020
- Game time: 4:00 p.m. EST
- Game weather: Sunny • Temperature: 64 °F (18 °C)
- Game attendance: 12,000
- Referee: David Smith
- TV announcers (SECN): Taylor Zarzour (play-by-play), Matt Stinchcomb (color), Taylor McGregor (sideline)

Game information

First Quarter

- (12:38) MISS – Jerrion Ealy 1 yard rush, Luke Logan kick
  Ole Miss 7–0; 8 plays, 75 yards, 2:22
- (7:36) UK – Terry Wilson 4 yard rush, Matt Ruffolo kick
  Tied 7–7; 4 plays, 29 yards, 1:54
- (1:33) UK – A. J. Rose 2 yard rush, Matt Ruffolo kick
  Kentucky 14–7; 8 plays, 80 yards, 4:25

Second Quarter

- (13:19) MISS – Kenny Yeboah 14 yard pass from Matt Corral, Luke Logan kick
  Tied 14–14; 10 plays, 75 yards, 3:14
- (0:29) UK – Terry Wilson 22 yard rush, Matt Ruffolo kick
  Kentucky 21–14; 9 plays, 83 yards, 3:25

Third Quarter

- (10:41) UK – Chris Rodriguez Jr. 22 yard rush, Matt Ruffolo kick
  Kentucky 28–14; 10 plays, 75 yards, 4:19
- (9:17) MISS – Jonathan Mingo 24 yard pass from Matt Corral, Luke Logan kick
  Kentucky 28–21; 4 plays, 75 yards, 1:24

Fourth Quarter

- (13:37) MISS – Jonathan Mingo 16 yard pass from Matt Corral, Luke Logan kick
  Tied 28–28; 5 plays, 54 yards, 1:30
- (8:23) MISS – Snoop Conner 1 yard rush, Luke Logan kick
  Ole Miss 35–28; 3 plays, 53 yards, 0:47
- (2:04) UK – Chris Rodriguez Jr. 1 yard rush, Matt Ruffolo kick
  Tied 35–35; 12 plays, 75 yards, 6:19

Overtime

- UK – Terry Wilson 10 yard rush, PAT missed
  Kentucky 41–35; 3 plays, 25 yards
- MISS – Elijah Moore 3 yard pass from Matt Corral, Luke Logan kick
  Ole Miss 42–41; 4 plays, 25 yards

Statistics	MISS	UK
First downs	26	26
Total yards	459	559
Passing yards	320	151
Rushing yards	139	408
Penalties	5–33	8–81
Turnovers	0	1
Time of possession	23:55	36:05

Team	Category	Player	Statistics
Ole Miss	Passing	Matt Corral	24/29, 320 yards, 4 TD
Ole Miss	Rushing	Matt Corral	13 carries, 51 yards
Ole Miss	Receiving	Jonathan Mingo	8 receptions, 128 yards, 2 TD
Kentucky	Passing	Terry Wilson	14/18, 151 yards
Kentucky	Rushing	Chris Rodriguez Jr.	17 carries, 133 yards, 2 TD
Kentucky	Receiving	Josh Ali	7 receptions, 88 yards

=== Mississippi State ===
Mississippi State vs. Kentucky

Quarter	1	2	3	4	Total
Bulldogs	0	0	2	0	2
Wildcats	0	14	0	10	24

at Kroger Field, Lexington, KY

- Date: October 10, 2020
- Game time: 7:30 p.m. EST
- Game weather: Cloudy • Temperature: 67 °F (19 °C) • Wind: 5 SE mph
- Game attendance: 12,000
- Referee: Ken Williamson
- TV: SECN

Statistics	MSST	UK
First downs	18	10
Total yards	295	157
Rushing yards	20	84
Passing yards	275	73
Turnovers	6	1
Time of possession	34:49	25:11

Team	Category	Player	Statistics
Mississippi State	Passing	K. J. Costello	36–55, 232 yards, 4 INT
Mississippi State	Rushing	Kylin Hill	7 rushes, 17 yards
Mississippi State	Receiving	Kylin Hill	15 receptions, 79 yards
Kentucky	Passing	Terry Wilson	8–20, 73 yards, TD
Kentucky	Rushing	Terry Wilson	13 rushes, 50 yards
Kentucky	Receiving	Josh Ali	2 receptions, 22 yards

=== At Tennessee ===
Kentucky vs. No. 21 Tennessee

Quarter	1	2	3	4	Total
Wildcats	0	17	10	7	34
No. 21 Volunteers	0	7	0	0	7

at Neyland Stadium, Knoxville, TN

- Date: October 17, 2020
- Game time: 12:00 p.m. EST
- Game weather: Sunny, Temperature: 85 °F (29 °C)
- Game attendance: 22,519
- Referee: Marc Curles
- TV announcers (SECN): Tom Hart (play-by-play), Jordan Rodgers (color), Cole Cubelic (sidelines)

Statistics	UK	UTK
First downs	18	18
Total yards	294	287
Rushing yards	187	175
Passing yards	107	112
Turnovers	1	4
Time of possession	33:59	26:01

Team	Category	Player	Statistics
Kentucky	Passing	Terry Wilson	12/15, 101 yards, TD
Kentucky	Rushing	Chris Rodriguez Jr.	13 carries, 73 yards, TD
Kentucky	Receiving	Josh Ali	4 receptions, 38 yards
Tennessee	Passing	Jarrett Guarantano	14/21, 88 yards, 2 INT
Tennessee	Rushing	Eric Gray	24 carries, 129 yards
Tennessee	Receiving	Brandon Johnson	4 receptions, 37 yards

=== At Missouri ===
Kentucky vs. Missouri

Quarter	1	2	3	4	Total
Wildcats	0	3	0	7	10
Tigers	7	3	7	3	20

at Faurot Field, Columbia, MO

- Date: October 24, 2020
- Game time: 4:00 p.m. EST
- Game weather: Cloudy • Temperature: 48 °F (9 °C) • Wind: NW 12-17mph
- Game attendance: 11,738
- Referee: Lee Hedrick
- TV: SECN

Statistics	UK	MIZ
First downs	8	26
Total yards	145	421
Rushing yards	95	220
Passing yards	50	201
Turnovers	1	0
Time of possession	16:50	43:10

Team	Category	Player	Statistics
Kentucky	Passing	Terry Wilson	4/11, 38 yards, TD
Kentucky	Rushing	Chris Rodriguez Jr.	9 carries, 48 yards
Kentucky	Receiving	Josh Ali	4 receptions, 47 yards, TD
Missouri	Passing	Connor Bazelak	21/30, 201 yards
Missouri	Rushing	Larry Rountree III	37 carries, 126 yards, 2 TD
Missouri	Receiving	Jalen Knox	5 receptions, 60 yards

=== Georgia ===
No. 5 Georgia vs. Kentucky

Quarter	1	2	3	4	Total
No. 5 Bulldogs	7	0	7	0	14
Wildcats	0	3	0	0	3

at Kroger Field, Lexington, KY

- Date: October 31, 2020
- Game time: 12:00 p.m. EST
- Game weather: Mostly Sunny • Temperature: 54 °F (12 °C) • Wind: 5 SE mph
- Game attendance: 12,000
- Referee: Matt Loeffler
- TV announcers (SECN): Tom Hart (play-by-play), Jordan Rodgers (analyst) and Cole Cubelic (sideline)

Game information

First quarter

- (6:07) UGA - Stetson Bennett 2-yard Run (Jack Podlesny Kick) (Drive: 12 plays, 86 yards, 5:06; Georgia 7-0)

Second Quarter

- (2:44) UK - Matt Ruffolo 34-yard Field Goal (Drive: 19 plays, 77 yards, 10:28; Georgia 7-3)

Third Quarter

- (11:38) Zamir White 22-yard Run (Jack Podlesny Kick) (Drive: 7 plays, 75 yards, 3:22; Georgia 14-3)

Statistics	UGA	UK
First downs	20	15
Plays–yards	58-346	65-229
Rushes–yards	43-215	39-138
Passing yards	131	91
Passing: comp–att–int	9-14-2	15-25-0
Time of possession	25:00	35:00

Team	Category	Player	Statistics
Georgia	Passing	Stetson Bennett	9/13, 131 yds, 2 INT
Georgia	Rushing	Zamir White	26 carries, 136 yds, 1 TD
Georgia	Receiving	James Cook	4 receptions, 62 yds,
Kentucky	Passing	Joey Gatewood	15-25, 91 yds
Kentucky	Rushing	Chris Rodriguez	20 carries, 108 yds
Kentucky	Receiving	Josh Ali	5 receptions, 35 yds

=== Vanderbilt ===
Vanderbilt vs. Kentucky

Quarter	1	2	3	4	Total
Commodores	0	14	7	14	35
Wildcats	14	10	7	7	38

at Kroger Field, Lexington, KY

- Date: November 14, 2020
- Game time: 12:00 p.m. EST
- Game weather: Cloudy • Temperature: 57 °F (14 °C) • Wind: 7 SE mph
- Game attendance: 12,000
- Referee: Alex Moore
- TV: SECN

Statistics	VAN	UK
First downs	29	23
Total yards	407	458
Rushing yards	180	308
Passing yards	227	150
Turnovers	0	0
Time of possession	32:26	27:34

Team	Category	Player	Statistics
Vanderbilt	Passing	Ken Seals	21/32, 225 yards, 2 TD
Vanderbilt	Rushing	Keyon Henry-Brooks	29 rushes, 121 yards
Vanderbilt	Receiving	Amir Abdur-Rahman	7 receptions, 89 yards
Kentucky	Passing	Terry Wilson	13/15, 110 yards, 2 TD
Kentucky	Rushing	Chris Rodriguez Jr.	13 rushes, 149 yards, 2 TD
Kentucky	Receiving	Keaton Upshaw	2 receptions, 41 yards, TD

=== At Alabama ===
Kentucky vs. No. 1 Alabama

Quarter	1	2	3	4	Total
Wildcats	3	0	0	0	3
No. 1 Crimson Tide	7	21	21	14	63

at Bryant–Denny Stadium, Tuscaloosa, AL

- Date: November 21, 2020
- Game time: 4:00 p.m. EST
- Game weather: Partly Cloudy • Temperature: 73 °F (23 °C) • Wind: ESE 3mph
- Game attendance: 19,424
- Referee: Ken Williamson
- TV announcers (SECN): Tom Hart (play-by-play), Jordan Rodgers (color), Cole Cubelic (sideline)

Statistics	Kentucky	Alabama
First downs	12	29
Total yards	179	509
Rushing yards	59	226
Passing yards	120	283
Turnovers	1	1
Time of possession	28:55	31:05

Team	Category	Player	Statistics
Kentucky	Passing	Terry Wilson	10–19, 120 yards, 1 INT
Kentucky	Rushing	A. J. Rose	10 carries, 68 yards
Kentucky	Receiving	Josh Ali	4 receptions, 52 yards
Alabama	Passing	Mac Jones	16–24, 230 yards, 2 TD's, 1 INT
Alabama	Rushing	Jase McClellan	10 carries, 99 yards, 1 TD
Alabama	Receiving	DeVonta Smith	9 receptions, 144 yards, 2 TD's

=== At Florida ===
Kentucky vs. Florida

Quarter	1	2	3	4	Total
Wildcats	0	10	0	0	10
Gators	7	7	17	3	34

at Ben Hill Griffin Stadium, Gainesville, FL

- Date: November 28, 2020
- Game time: 12:00 p.m. EST
- Game weather: Partly Cloudy • Temperature: 75 °F (24 °C) • Wind: NE 8mph
- Game attendance: 14,453
- Referee: David Smith
- TV announcers (ESPN): Mark Jones, Dusty Dvoracek, and Marty Smith

Game information

First quarter

- Florida – Kyle Pitts 56-yard pass from Kyle Trask (Evan McPherson kick), 6:03

Second quarter

- Kentucky – Keaton Upshaw 4-yard pass from Terry Wilson (Matt Ruffolo kick), 11:18
- Kentucky – Matt Ruffolo 22-yard field goal, 2:13
- Florida – Kadarius Toney 50-yard punt return (Evan McPherson kick), 0:42

Third quarter

- Florida – Kyle Pitts 2-yard pass from Kyle Trask (Evan McPherson kick), 12:35
- Florida – Evan McPherson 34-yard field goal, 5:58
- Florida – Kyle Pitts 7-yard pass from Kyle Trask (Evan McPherson kick), 3:36

Fourth quarter

- Florida – Evan McPherson 40-yard field goal, 8:18

Statistics	UTK	FLA
First downs	15	21
Total yards	221	418
Rushing yards	159	104
Passing yards	62	314
Turnovers	3	2
Time of possession	33:19	26:41

Team	Category	Player	Statistics
Kentucky	Passing	Terry Wilson	10/18, 62 yards, TD, 2 INT
Kentucky	Rushing	A. J. Rose	15 carries, 58 yards
Kentucky	Receiving	Josh Ali	6 receptions, 32 yards
Florida	Passing	Kyle Trask	21/27, 256 yards, 3 TD
Florida	Rushing	Dameon Pierce	8 carries, 67 yards
Florida	Receiving	Kyle Pitts	5 receptions, 99 yards, 3 TD

=== South Carolina ===
South Carolina vs. Kentucky

Quarter	1	2	3	4	Total
Gamecocks	3	0	7	8	18
Wildcats	10	17	7	7	41

at Kroger Field, Lexington, KY

- Date: December 5, 2020
- Game time: 7:30 p.m. EST
- Game weather: Clear • Temperature: 35 °F (2 °C) • Wind: 4 NW mph
- Game attendance: 12,000
- Referee: Marc Curles
- TV: SECN
- • Box Score

Game information

First Quarter

- (5:41) UK – Matt Ruffolo 22-yard field goal (Drive: 12 plays, 75 yards, 5:20; Kentucky 3–0)
- (4:19) UK – Chris Rodriguez Jr. 1-yard run, Matt Ruffolo kick (Drive: 2 plays, 26 yards, 0:28; Kentucky 10–0)
- (1:45) SC – Parker White 47-yard field goal (Drive: 6 plays, 10 yards, 2:25; Kentucky 10–3)

Second Quarter

- (10:30) UK – Asim Rose Jr. 8-yard run, Matt Ruffolo kick (Drive: 5 plays, 81 yards, 2:01; Kentucky 17–3)
- (1:14) UK – Chris Rodriguez Jr. 2-yard run, Matt Ruffolo kick (Drive: 7 plays, 39 yards, 3:26; Kentucky 24–3)
- (0:00) UK – Matt Ruffolo 41-yard field goal (Drive: 4 plays, 10 yards, 0:42; Kentucky 27–3)

Third Quarter

- (7:28) UK – Terry Wilson 1-yard run, Matt Ruffolo kick (Drive: 13 plays, 75 yards, 7:32; Kentucky 34–3)
- (5:21) SC – Kevin Harris 15-yard run, Parker White kick (Drive: 7 plays, 86 yards, 2:03; Kentucky 34–10)

Fourth Quarter

- (5:12) SC – Dakereon Joyner 30-yard pass from Luke Doty, Luke Doty pass to Nick Muse for two-point conversion (Drive: 9 plays, 90 yards, 3:27; Kentucky 34–18)
- (4:56) UK – Chris Rodriguez Jr. 79-yard run, Matt Ruffolo kick (Drive: 1 play, 79 yards, 0:12; Kentucky 41–18)

Statistics	SC	UK
First downs	21	24
Total yards	404	492
Rushes/yards	44/297	45/291
Passing yards	107	201
Passing: Comp–Att–Int	12-27-1	17-26-0
Time of possession	25:49	34:11

Team	Category	Player	Statistics
South Carolina	Passing	Luke Doty	11–25, 85 yards, 1 TD, 1 INT
South Carolina	Rushing	Kevin Harris	21 carries, 210 yards, 1 TD
South Carolina	Receiving	Dakereon Joyner	4 receptions, 43 yards, 1 TD
Kentucky	Passing	Terry Wilson	17–26, 201 yards
Kentucky	Rushing	Chris Rodriguez Jr.	14 carries, 139 yards, 3 TD
Kentucky	Receiving	Justin Rigg	3 receptions, 72 yards

=== Vs. NC State (Gator Bowl) ===
Kentucky vs. Florida (2021 TaxSlayer Gator Bowl)

Quarter	1	2	3	4	Total
No. 23 NC State	0	0	7	14	21
Kentucky	3	10	0	10	23

at TIAA Bank Field • Jacksonville, Florida

- Date: Saturday, January 2, 2021
- Game time: 12:00 p.m. EST
- Game weather: Cloudy • Temperature: 74 °F (23 °C) • Wind: SSW 13 mph
- Game attendance: 10,422
- Referee: Reggie Smith
- TV announcers (ESPN): Anish Shroff (play-by-play), Tom Luginbill (analyst) and Lericia Harris (sideline)
- ESPN game summary

Game information

First quarter

- (6:00) UK – Matt Ruffolo 25 yard field goal (Drive: 16 plays, 68 plays, 9:00; Kentucky 3–0)

Second quarter

- (6:23) UK – Chris Rodriguez 4 yard rush, Matt Ruffolo kick (Drive: 6 plays, 79 yards, 2:39; Kentucky 10–0)
- (0:02) UK – Matt Ruffolo 26 yard field goal (Drive: 7 plays, 69 yards, 1:21; Kentucky 13–0)

Third quarter

- (2:56) NCST – C.J. Riley 9 yard pass from Bailey Hockman, Christopher Dunn kick (Drive: 13 plays, 76 yards, 6:12; Kentucky 13–7)

Fourth quarter

- (5:45) UK – Matt Ruffolo 20 yard field goal (Drive: 7 plays, 40 yards, 3:09; Kentucky 16–7)
- (4:46) NCST – Zonovan Knight 13 yard rush, Christopher Dunn kick (Drive: 3 plays, 37 yards, 0:54; Kentucky 16–14)
- (2:55) UK – Chris Rodriguez 26 yard rush, Matt Ruffolo kick (Drive: 1 play, 26 yards, 0:07; Kentucky 23–14)
- (1:10) NCST – Jordan Houston 2 yard rush, Christopher Dunn kick (Drive: 7 plays, 65 yards, 1:41; Kentucky 23–21)

Statistics	NCST	UK
First downs	19	19
Plays–yards	66–318	68–380
Rushes–yards	26–50	48–281
Passing yards	268	99
Passing: comp–att–int	27–40–3	12–20–0
Time of possession	25:53	34:07

Team	Category	Player	Statistics
NC State	Passing	Bailey Hockman	27/40, 268 yards, 1 TD, 3 INT
NC State	Rushing	Zonovan Knight	12 carries, 52 yards, 1 TD
NC State	Receiving	Thayer Thomas	3 receptions, 46 yards
Kentucky	Passing	Terry Wilson	12/20, 99 yards
Kentucky	Rushing	Asim Rose Jr.	12 carries, 148 yards
Kentucky	Receiving	Keaton Upshaw	2 receptions, 25 yards

== Players drafted into the NFL ==
Round	Pick	Player	Position	NFL Club
1	19	Jamin Davis	LB	Washington Football Team
2	44	Kelvin Joseph	CB	Dallas Cowboys
6	192	Quinton Bohanna	DT	Dallas Cowboys
6	200	Brandin Echols	CB	New York Jets
6	206	Landon Young	OT	New Orleans Saints
7	232	Phil Hoskins	DT	Carolina Panthers
