= 2020 Ball State Cardinals football team =

American college football season

2020 Ball State Cardinals football

MAC champion MAC West Division champion Arizona Bowl champion

MAC Championship Game, W 38–28 vs. Buffalo

Arizona Bowl, W 34–13 vs. San Jose State
- Conference: Mid-American Conference
- West Division

Ranking
- Coaches: No. 23
- AP: No. 23
- Record: 7–1 (5–1 MAC)
- Head coach: Mike Neu (5th season)
- Offensive coordinator: Kevin Lynch (1st season)
- Offensive scheme: Multiple
- Defensive coordinator: Tyler Stockton (2nd season)
- Base defense: 3–4
- Home stadium: Scheumann Stadium

2020 Mid-American Conference football standings
	Conf.			Overall
Team	W		L	W		L
East Division
No. 25 Buffalo xy	5	–	0	6	–	1
Kent State	3	–	1	3	–	1
Ohio	2	–	1	2	–	1
Miami (OH)	2	–	1	2	–	1
Akron	1	–	5	1	–	5
Bowling Green	0	–	5	0	–	5
West Division
No. 23 Ball State xy$	5	–	1	7	–	1
Western Michigan	4	–	2	4	–	2
Toledo	4	–	2	4	–	2
Central Michigan	3	–	3	3	–	3
Eastern Michigan	2	–	4	2	–	4
Northern Illinois	0	–	6	0	–	6
Championship: Ball State 38, Buffalo 28
$ – Conference champion; x – Division champion/co-champions; y – Championship game participant; Note: Due to COVID-19, the Mid-American suspended the season on August 8, but later decided to begin play on November 4.; Rankings from AP Poll.

The 2020 Ball State Cardinals football team represented Ball State University during the 2020 NCAA Division I FBS football season. The Cardinals were led by fifth-year head coach Mike Neu and played their home games at Scheumann Stadium in Muncie, Indiana. They competed as members of the West Division of the Mid-American Conference.

In a season impacted by the COVID-19 pandemic, the Cardinals played to a 5–1 record in a limited regular-season schedule. The team then defeated Buffalo in the conference championship game. The season ended with a victory over San Jose State in the Arizona Bowl for the first bowl game victory in program history.

== Schedule ==
Ball State had games scheduled against Indiana, Maine, and Michigan, which were canceled due to the COVID-19 pandemic. On July 28, it was announced that Ball State had added Iowa State to the schedule. Soon after, the MAC decided to cancel its season, followed by the same announcements from the Big Ten Conference, Pac-12 Conference, and Mountain West Conference.

On September 25, the Mid-American Conference changed course, playing a six-week scheduled football season starting the week of November 4.

Date	Time	Opponent	Site	TV	Result	Attendance	Source
November 4	7:00 p.m.	at Miami (OH)	Yager Stadium; Oxford, OH	CBSSN	L 31–38	0	
November 11	7:00 p.m.	Eastern Michigan	Scheumann Stadium; Muncie, IN	CBSSN	W 38–31	1,183	
November 18	7:00 p.m.	Northern Illinois	Scheumann Stadium; Muncie, IN (Bronze Stalk Trophy)	ESPNews	W 31–25	0	
November 28	12:00 p.m.	at Toledo	Glass Bowl; Toledo, OH	ESPN3	W 27–24	0	
December 5	5:30 p.m.	at Central Michigan	Kelly/Shorts Stadium; Mount Pleasant, MI	ESPNU	W 45–20	0	
December 12	12:00 p.m.	Western Michigan	Scheumann Stadium; Muncie, IN	ESPN+	W 30–27	823	
December 18	7:30 p.m.	vs. Buffalo	Ford Field; Detroit, MI (MAC Championship Game)	ESPN	W 38–28	0	
December 31	2:00 p.m.	vs. No. 22 San Jose State*	Arizona Stadium; Tucson, AZ (Arizona Bowl)	CBS	W 34–13	0	
*Non-conference game; Rankings from AP Poll and CFP Rankings after November 24 released prior to game; All times are in Eastern time

== Game summaries ==
=== Miami ===
Red Bird Rivalry

Team	1	2	3	4	Total
Cardinals	7	7	7	10	31
• RedHawks	0	10	14	14	38

- Date: November 4, 2020
- Location: Yager Stadium
  Oxford, OH
- Game start: 7:02 p.m. EST
- Elapsed time: 3 hours and 42 minutes
- Game weather: Temperature: 58 °F (14 °C) • Weather: Clear Skies • Wind: 4 miles per hour (6.4 km/h), SW
- Referee: J. Valentine
- TV announcers (CBSSN): John Sadak (play–by–play), Ross Tucker (analyst)

=== Eastern Michigan ===
Ball State vs. Eastern Michigan

Team	1	2	3	4	Total
Eagles	14	7	3	7	31
• Cardinals	7	6	8	17	38

- Date: November 11, 2020
- Location: Scheumann Stadium
  Muncie, IN
- Game start: 7:02 p.m. EST
- Elapsed time: 3 hours and 39 minutes
- Game attendance: 1,183
- Game weather: 38 °F (3 °C) • Weather: Clear • Wind: 5 miles per hour (8.0 km/h), N
- Referee: Greg Sujack
- TV announcers (CBSSN): Ben Holden (play–by–play), Ross Tucker (analyst)

=== Northern Illinois ===
Bronze Stalk Trophy

Team	1	2	3	4	Total
Huskies	7	7	0	11	25
• Cardinals	0	14	6	11	31

- Date: November 18, 2020
- Location: Scheumann Stadium
  Muncie, IN
- Game start: 7:02 p.m. EST
- Elapsed time: 3 hours and 22 minutes
- Game attendance: 859
- Game weather: 45 °F (7 °C) • Weather: Clear • Wind: 12 miles per hour (19 km/h)
- Referee: Ron Hudson
- TV announcers (ESPNews): Clay Matvick (play–by–play), Rocky Boiman (analyst)

=== Toledo ===
Ball State vs. Toledo

Team	1	2	3	4	Total
• Cardinals	14	3	7	3	27
Rockets	0	3	6	15	24

- Date: November 28, 2020
- Location: Glass Bowl
  Toledo, OH
- Game start: 12:05 p.m. EST
- Elapsed time: 3 hours and 43 minutes
- Game attendance: 0
- Game weather: 41 °F (5 °C) • Weather: Sunny skies • Wind: 9 miles per hour (14 km/h) W
- Referee: Bryan Banks
- TV announcers (ESPN3): Michael Reghi (play–by–play), Devin Gardner (analyst)

=== Central Michigan ===
Ball State vs. Central Michigan

Team	1	2	3	4	Total
• Cardinals	10	14	14	7	45
Chippewas	0	7	7	6	20

- Date: December 5, 2020
- Location: Kelly/Shorts Stadium
  Mount Pleasant, MI
- Game start: 2:02 p.m. EST
- Elapsed time: 3 hours and 13 minutes
- Game attendance: 0
- Game weather: 34 °F (1 °C) • Weather: Sunny • Wind: 5 miles per hour (8.0 km/h) W
- Referee: Tom Stapleton
- TV announcers (ESPNU): Clay Matvick, Rocky Boiman

=== Western Michigan ===
Ball State vs. Western Michigan

Team	1	2	3	4	Total
Broncos	3	17	7	0	27
• Cardinals	6	7	0	17	30

- Date: December 12, 2020
- Location: Scheumann Stadium
  Muncie, IN
- Game start: 12:05 p.m. EST
- Elapsed time: 3 hours and 33 minutes
- Game attendance: 823
- Game weather: 57 °F (14 °C) • Weather: Mostly sunny • Wind: 20 miles per hour (32 km/h) SW
- Referee: Ron Hudson
- TV announcers (ESPN+): Joel Godett, Jay Walker

=== Buffalo (MAC Championship Game) ===
Ball State vs. Buffalo
MAC Championship Game

Team	1	2	3	4	Total
• Cardinals	7	28	3	0	38
Bulls	14	7	7	0	28

- Date: December 18, 2020
- Location: Ford Field
  Detroit, MI
- Game start: 7:31 p.m. EST
- Elapsed time: 3 hours and 25 minutes
- Game attendance: 0
- Game weather: n/a (indoor stadium)
- Referee: Tom Stapleton
- TV announcers (ESPN): Clay Matvick (play-by-play), Rocky Boiman (analyst) and Katie George (sideline)

=== San Jose State (Arizona Bowl) ===
Ball State vs. San Jose State
Arizona Bowl

Team	1	2	3	4	Total
• Cardinals	27	0	7	0	34
No. 22 Spartans	0	0	13	0	13

- Date: December 31, 2020
- Location: Arizona Stadium • Tucson, AZ
- Game start: 2:13 p.m. EST
- Elapsed time: 3 hours and 31 minutes
- Game attendance: 0
- Game weather: 54 °F (12 °C) • Weather: Scattered clouds • Wind: 8 miles per hour (13 km/h) ESE
- Referee: Joe Lehring
- TV announcers (CBS): Brad Nessler (play-by-play), Rick Neuheisel (analyst) and Jenny Dell (sideline)
