= A. J. Rose =

American football player (born 1997)

Profile
- Position: Running back

Personal information
- Born: October 14, 1997 (age 29); Cleveland, Ohio, U.S.
- Listed height: 6 ft 1 in (1.85 m)
- Listed weight: 212 lb (96 kg)

Career information
- High school: Garfield Heights (Garfield Heights, Ohio)
- College: Kentucky
- NFL draft: 2021: undrafted

Career history
- Minnesota Vikings (2021–2022)*; Los Angeles Rams (2022)*; Montreal Alouettes (2023)*
- * Offseason or practice squad member only
- Stats at Pro Football Reference

Asim Rose Jr. (born October 14, 1997) is an American professional football running back. He played college football at Kentucky.

== Early life ==
Rose grew up in Cleveland, Ohio and attended Garfield Heights High School in Garfield Heights, Ohio. As a senior, he became Garfield Heights' starting quarterback after an injury to the starter and passed for 616 yards and 10 touchdowns while rushing 94 times for 770 yards and 12 touchdowns.

== College career ==
Rose was a member of the Kentucky Wildcats for five seasons, redshirting his true freshman year. Rose began to see significant playing time as a redshirt sophomore as the backup to Benny Snell and finished the season with 479 rushing yards with five touchdowns on 86 carries. He rushed 149 times for 826 yards and six touchdowns during his junior season. As a senior, Rose rushed for 666 yards and two touchdowns on 106 carries. Rose finished his collegiate career with 1,971 rushing yards and 13 rushing touchdowns with 30 receptions for 233 yards and one touchdown.

== Professional career ==
=== Minnesota Vikings ===
Rose signed with the Minnesota Vikings as an undrafted free agent on May 4, 2021. He was waived as part of final roster cuts on August 31, 2021, and re-signed to the practice squad. Rose was cut by the Vikings on December 21 after being activated from the COVID-19 injured list, but re-signed with the team on December 23. He signed a reserve/future contract with the Vikings on January 10, 2022. He was waived on June 1, 2022.

=== Los Angeles Rams ===
On June 15, 2022, Rose signed with the Los Angeles Rams. He was waived on August 20.

=== Montreal Alouettes ===
Rose signed with the Montreal Alouettes of the Canadian Football League (CFL) on February 13, 2023. On June 3, 2023, Rose was released by the Alouettes.
