= 2020 Southeastern Conference football season =

- League: NCAA Division I FBS football season
- Sport: Football
- Duration: September 26, 2020 through January 2021
- Teams: 14
- TV partner(s): CBS Sports Family (CBS, CBSSN), ESPN Family (ESPN, ESPN2, ESPN3, ESPNU, SEC Network, ABC, ESPN+)

2021 NFL Draft
- Top draft pick: Kyle Pitts (Florida)
- Picked by: Atlanta Falcons, 4th overall

Regular season
- East champions: Florida
- East runners-up: Georgia
- West champions: Alabama

SEC Championship Game
- Date: December 19, 2020
- Venue: Mercedes-Benz Stadium, Atlanta, Georgia
- Champions: Alabama
- Runners-up: Florida
- Finals MVP: Najee Harris, RB

Football seasons
- 2019 2021

2020 Southeastern Conference football standings
	Conf.			Overall
Team	W		L	W		L
Eastern Division
No. 13 Florida x	8	–	2	8	–	4
No. 7 Georgia	7	–	2	8	–	2
Missouri	5	–	5	5	–	5
Kentucky	4	–	6	5	–	6
Tennessee*	3	–	7	3	–	7
South Carolina	2	–	8	2	–	8
Vanderbilt	0	–	9	0	–	9
Western Division
No. 1 Alabama x$#^	10	–	0	13	–	0
No. 4 Texas A&M	8	–	1	9	–	1
Auburn	6	–	4	6	–	5
LSU*	5	–	5	5	–	5
Ole Miss	4	–	5	5	–	5
Arkansas	3	–	7	3	–	7
Mississippi State	3	–	7	4	–	7
Championship: Alabama 52, Florida 46
# – College Football Playoff champion; ^ – College Football Playoff participant; $ – Conference champion; x – Division champion/co-champions; * – Tennessee vacated all wins due to NCAA violations. LSU was ineligible for postseason due to self imposed ban. Note: Due to COVID-19, the SEC played a conference-only schedule.; Rankings from AP Poll.

The 2020 Southeastern Conference football season was the 88th season of SEC football taking place during the 2020 NCAA Division I FBS football season. The season was scheduled to begin on September 3, 2020 and end with the 2020 SEC Championship Game on December 5, 2020. The SEC is a Power Five conference under the College Football Playoff. The entire schedule was originally released on August 7, 2019. However, the 2020 season had to be shortened due to complications from the COVID-19 pandemic, resulting in the season beginning September 26 and ending with the 2020 SEC Championship Game on December 19.

== Preseason ==
=== SEC media days ===
The 2020 SEC Media days were scheduled to take place at the College Football Hall of Fame in Atlanta, Georgia in July 2020. The event was canceled due to the COVID-19 pandemic

== Head coaches ==
Four Coaches were fired after the 2019 season.

Arkansas Head Coach Chad Morris was fired after almost two seasons at the school on November 10, 2019. Barry Lunney Jr. was named interim head coach for the final two games of the season and was replaced by Georgia Offensive Line Coach and associate Head Coach Sam Pittman on December 7, 2019.

On November 30, 2019, Missouri Head Coach Barry Odom was fired and Replaced by Appalachian State Head Coach Eliah Drinkwitz on December 8, 2019.

On December 1, 2019, Ole Miss Coach Matt Luke was fired and replaced by former FAU Head Coach Lane Kiffin.

On December 7, 2019, Mississippi State Head Coach Joe Moorhead was fired. On January 3, 2020, he was replaced by former Washington State head coach Mike Leach.

School	Coach	Year
Alabama	Nick Saban	14th
Arkansas	Sam Pittman	1st
Auburn	Gus Malzahn	8th
Florida	Dan Mullen	3rd
Georgia	Kirby Smart	5th
Kentucky	Mark Stoops	8th
LSU	Ed Orgeron	4th
Mississippi State	Mike Leach	1st
Missouri	Eliah Drinkwitz	1st
Ole Miss	Lane Kiffin	1st
South Carolina	Will Muschamp	5th
Tennessee	Jeremy Pruitt	3rd
Texas A&M	Jimbo Fisher	3rd
Vanderbilt	Derek Mason	7th

== Rankings ==
		Pre	Wk 1 (n/a)	Wk 2	Wk 3	Wk 4	Wk 5	Wk 6	Wk 7	Wk 8	Wk 9	Wk 10	Wk 11	Wk 12	Wk 13	Wk 14	Wk 15	Wk 16	Final
Alabama	AP	3 (2)		2	2 (1)	2 (3)	2 (8)	2 (2)	2 (8)	2 (10)	2 (29)	1 (59)	1 (60)	1 (62)	1 (62)	1 (62)	1 (62)	1 (62)	1 (61)
Alabama	C	3 (4)		2 (1)	2 (1)	2 (4)	2 (14)	2 (5)	2 (8)	2 (8)	2 (17)	1 (55)	1 (56)	1 (59)	1 (59)	1 (59)	1 (60)	1 (61)	1 (60)
Alabama	CFP	Not released												1	1	1	1	1	
Arkansas	AP						RV		RV	RV									
Arkansas	C						RV	RV	RV	RV	RV	RV	RV						
Arkansas	CFP	Not released																	
Auburn	AP	11		8	8т	7	13	15	RV	RV	24	24	23	22	RV	RV	RV		
Auburn	C	11		9	8	7	13	14	RV	RV	21	21	21	19	RV	RV	RV	RV	RV
Auburn	CFP	Not released												22					
Florida	AP	8		5	5	3	4	10	10	10	8	6	6	6	6	6	11	10	13
Florida	C	8		6	6	3	3т	9	8	9	8	5	5	5	5	6	11	10	12
Florida	CFP	Not released												6	6	6	7	7	
Georgia	AP	4		4	4	4	3	3 (1)	4	5	5	12	13	13	11	12	10	11	7
Georgia	C	4		4	3т	4	3т	3	4	5	5	11	11	10	10	10	9	9	7
Georgia	CFP	Not released												9	8	9	8	9	
Kentucky	AP	RV		23т	23	RV			RV										
Kentucky	C	RV		20	RV	RV	RV	RV	RV		RV	RV	RV						RV
Kentucky	CFP	Not released																	
LSU	AP	6 (1)		6 (1)	6 (1)	20	17	RV											
LSU	C	5		5 (3)	5 (1)	17	16	RV	RV	RV				RV					
LSU	CFP	Not released																	
Mississippi State	AP	RV		RV	RV	16	RV												
Mississippi State	C	RV		RV	RV	14	RV	RV											
Mississippi State	CFP	Not released																	
Missouri	AP	RV		RV				RV								RV			
Missouri	C			RV				RV	RV	RV	RV	RV	RV	RV	RV	RV	RV		RV
Missouri	CFP	Not released														25			
Ole Miss	AP			RV	RV		RV	RV											
Ole Miss	C			RV	RV	RV	RV	RV							RV				
Ole Miss	CFP	Not released																	
South Carolina	AP								RV										
South Carolina	C			RV	RV	RV			RV		RV								
South Carolina	CFP	Not released																	
Tennessee	AP	25		15	16	21	14	18	RV										
Tennessee	C	RV		17	21	20	12	17	RV	RV	RV	RV	RV						
Tennessee	CFP	Not released																	
Texas A&M	AP	13		10	10	13	21	11	7	8	7	5	5	5	5	5	5	5	4
Texas A&M	C	13		10	11	13	20	11	9	8	7	6	6	6	6	5	5	5	4
Texas A&M	CFP	Not released												5	5	5	5	5	
Vanderbilt	AP																		
Vanderbilt	C																		
Vanderbilt	CFP	Not released																	

Legend
	Improvement in ranking
	Drop in ranking
	Not ranked previous week
	No change in ranking from previous week
RV	Received votes but were not ranked in Top 25 of poll
т	Tied with team above or below also with this symbol

== Schedule ==
=== Regular season ===
The Schedule was released on August 7, 2019. The season was scheduled to begin on September 3, 2020 and end on December 5, 2020. The SEC Championship Game was scheduled for December 12, 2020. The regular-season schedule was severely impacted by the COVID-19 pandemic. On July 10, 2020, the Pac-12 announced it was going to compete in a conference-only season, thus cancelling the non-conference games of Alabama vs. USC and Texas A&M vs. Colorado. On July 30, 2020, The SEC announced that it would play a 10-game, conference only schedule beginning on September 26 with the SEC Championship game to be played on December 19. The revised 2020 SEC schedule was released on August 17, 2020.

==== Week One ====
Date	Time	Visiting team	Home team	Site	TV	Result	Attendance	Ref.
September 26	12:00 p.m.	No. 5 Florida	Ole Miss	Vaught–Hemingway Stadium • Oxford, MS	ESPN	FLA 51–35	13,926	
September 26	12:00 p.m.	No. 23 Kentucky	No. 8 Auburn	Jordan–Hare Stadium • Auburn, AL	SECN	AUB 29–13	17,490	
September 26	3:30 p.m.	Mississippi State	No. 6 LSU	Tiger Stadium • Baton Rouge, LA (rivalry)	CBS	MISS ST 44–34	21,124	
September 26	4:00 p.m.	No. 4 Georgia	Arkansas	Donald W. Reynolds Razorback Stadium • Fayetteville, AR	SECN	UGA 37–10	16,500	
September 26	7:00 p.m.	No. 2 Alabama	Missouri	Faurot Field • Columbia, MO	ESPN	ALA 38–19	11,738	
September 26	7:30 p.m.	No. 16 Tennessee	South Carolina	Williams–Brice Stadium • Columbia, SC	SECN	TENN 31–27	15,009	
September 26	7:30 p.m.	Vanderbilt	Texas A&M	Kyle Field • College Station, TX	SECN	TAMU 17–12	24,073	
^{#}Rankings from AP Poll released prior to game. All times are in Eastern Time.

==== Week Two ====
Date	Time	Visiting team	Home team	Site	TV	Result	Attendance	Ref.
October 3	12:00 p.m.	South Carolina	No. 3 Florida	Ben Hill Griffin Stadium • Gainesville, FL	ESPN	FLA 38–24	15,120	
October 3	12:00 p.m.	Missouri	No. 21 Tennessee	Neyland Stadium • Knoxville, TN	SECN	TENN 35–12	21,159	
October 3	3:30 p.m.	No. 13 Texas A&M	No. 2 Alabama	Bryant–Denny Stadium • Tuscaloosa, AL	CBS	ALA 52–24	19,424	
October 3	4:00 p.m.	Ole Miss	Kentucky	Kroger Field • Lexington, KY	SECN	MISS 42–41 ^{OT}	12,000	
October 3	7:30 p.m.	No. 7 Auburn	No. 4 Georgia	Sanford Stadium • Athens, GA (Deep South's Oldest Rivalry)	ESPN	UGA 27–6	20,524	
October 3	7:30 p.m.	No. 20 LSU	Vanderbilt	Vanderbilt Stadium • Nashville, TN	SECN	LSU 41–7	2,000	
October 3	7:30 p.m.	Arkansas	No. 16 Mississippi State	Davis Wade Stadium • Starkville, MS	SECN	ARK 21–14	13,564	
^{#}Rankings from AP Poll released prior to game. All times are in Eastern Time.

==== Week Three ====
Date	Time	Visiting team	Home team	Site	TV	Result	Attendance	Ref.
October 10	12:00 p.m.	No. 4 Florida	No. 21 Texas A&M	Kyle Field • College Station, TX	ESPN	TAMU 41–38	24,709	
October 10	12:00 p.m.	South Carolina	Vanderbilt	Vanderbilt Stadium • Nashville, TN	SECN	SCAR 41–7	1,288	
October 10	12:00 p.m.	Missouri	No. 17 LSU	Faurot Field • Columbia, MO^{[a]}	SECN	MIZZOU 45–41	10,013	
October 10	3:30 p.m.	No. 14 Tennessee	No. 3 Georgia	Sanford Stadium • Athens, GA (rivalry)	CBS	UGA 44–21	20,524	
October 10	4:00 p.m.	Arkansas	No. 13 Auburn	Jordan–Hare Stadium • Auburn, AL	ESPN	AUB 30–28	17,490	
October 10	7:30 p.m.	No. 2 Alabama	Ole Miss	Vaught–Hemingway Stadium • Oxford, MS (rivalry)	ESPN	ALA 63–48	14,419	
October 10	7:30 p.m.	Mississippi State	Kentucky	Kroger Field • Lexington, KY	SECN	UK 24–2	12,000	
^{#}Rankings from AP Poll released prior to game. All times are in Eastern Time.

^{^[a]}The game between LSU and Missouri was originally scheduled to take place in Baton Rouge, Louisiana. However, in light of Hurricane Delta, the game was moved to Columbia, Missouri.

==== Week Four ====
Date	Time	Visiting team	Home team	Site	TV	Result	Attendance	Ref.
October 17	12:00 p.m.	No. 14 Auburn	South Carolina	Williams–Brice Stadium • Columbia, SC	ESPN	SCAR 30–22	15,766	
October 17	12:00 p.m.	Kentucky	No. 18 Tennessee	Neyland Stadium • Knoxville, TN (rivalry)	SECN	UK 34–7	22,519	
October 17	3:30 p.m.	Ole Miss	Arkansas	Donald W. Reynolds Razorback Stadium • Fayetteville, AR (rivalry)	SECN	ARK 33–21	16,500	
October 17	4:00 p.m.	No. 11 Texas A&M	Mississippi State	Davis Wade Stadium • Starkville, MS	ESPN	TAMU 28–14	13,142	
October 17	8:00 p.m.	No. 3 Georgia	No. 2 Alabama	Bryant–Denny Stadium • Tuscaloosa, AL (rivalry)	CBS	ALA 41–24	19,424	
^{#}Rankings from AP Poll released prior to game. All times are in Eastern Time.

Date	Bye Week			
October 17	Florida	LSU	Missouri	Vanderbilt

==== Week Five ====
Date	Time	Visiting team	Home team	Site	TV	Result	Attendance	Ref.
October 24	12:00 p.m.	Auburn	Ole Miss	Vaught–Hemingway Stadium • Oxford, MS (rivalry)	SECN	AUB 35–28	15,037	
October 24	3:30 p.m.	Alabama	Tennessee	Neyland Stadium • Knoxville, TN (Third Saturday in October)	CBS	ALA 48–17	23,394	
October 24^{[b]}	4:00 p.m.	Kentucky	Missouri	Faurot Field • Columbia, MO	SECN	MIZZOU 20–10	11,738	
October 24	7:00 p.m.	South Carolina	LSU	Tiger Stadium • Baton Rouge, LA	ESPN	LSU 52–24	21,855	
^{#}Rankings from AP Poll released prior to game. All times are in Eastern Time.

^{^[b]}The game between Kentucky and Missouri was originally scheduled to take place on October 31. However, schedule adjustments stemming from the COVID-19 outbreak in the Florida program caused it to be rescheduled for October 24.

Date	Bye Week					
October 24	Arkansas	Florida	Georgia	Mississippi State	Texas A&M	Vanderbilt

==== Week Six ====
Date	Time	Visiting team	Home team	Site	TV	Result	Attendance	Ref.
October 31^{[c]}	12:00 p.m.	No. 5 Georgia	Kentucky	Kroger Field • Lexington, KY	SECN	UGA 14–3	12,000	
October 31	3:30 p.m.	LSU	Auburn	Jordan–Hare Stadium • Auburn, AL (Tiger Bowl)	CBS	AUB 48–11	17,490	
October 31	4:00 p.m.	Ole Miss	Vanderbilt	Vanderbilt Stadium • Nashville, TN (rivalry)	SECN	MISS 54–21	840	
October 31	7:00 p.m.	Mississippi State	No. 2 Alabama	Bryant–Denny Stadium • Tuscaloosa, AL (rivalry)	ESPN	ALA 41–0	19,424	
October 31	7:30 p.m.	Arkansas	No. 8 Texas A&M	Kyle Field • College Station, TX (Southwest Classic)	SECN	TAMU 42–31	27,114	
October 31^{[c]}	7:30 p.m.	Missouri	No. 10 Florida	Ben Hill Griffin Stadium • Gainesville, FL	SECN	FLA 41–17	12,049	
^{#}Rankings from AP Poll released prior to game. All times are in Eastern Time.

^{^[c]}The games between Georgia and Kentucky and Missouri and Florida were originally scheduled to take place on October 24. However, schedule adjustments stemming from the COVID-19 outbreak in the Florida program caused it to be rescheduled for October 31.

Date	Bye Week	
October 31	South Carolina	Tennessee

==== Week Seven ====
Date	Time	Visiting team	Home team	Site	TV	Result	Attendance	Ref.
November 7	3:30 p.m.	No. 8 Florida	No. 5 Georgia	TIAA Bank Field • Jacksonville, FL (rivalry)	CBS	FLA 44–28	19,210	
November 7	4:00 p.m.	Vanderbilt	Mississippi State	Davis Wade Stadium • Starkville, MS	SECN	MISS ST 24–17	12,888	
November 7	7:00 p.m.	No. 7 Texas A&M	South Carolina	Williams–Brice Stadium • Columbia, SC	ESPN	TAMU 48–3	16,253	
November 7	7:30 p.m.	Tennessee	Arkansas	Donald W. Reynolds Razorback Stadium • Fayetteville, AR	SECN	ARK 24–13	16,500	
^{#}Rankings from AP Poll released prior to game. All times are in Eastern Time.

Date	Bye Week					
November 7	Alabama	Auburn	Kentucky	LSU	Ole Miss	Missouri

==== Week Eight ====
Date	Time	Visiting team	Home team	Site	TV	Result	Attendance	Ref.
November 14	12:00 p.m.	Vanderbilt	Kentucky	Kroger Field • Lexington, KY (rivalry)	SECN	UK 38–35	12,000	
November 14	7:00 p.m.	Arkansas	No. 6 Florida	Ben Hill Griffin Stadium • Gainesville, FL	ESPN	FLA 63–35	16,116	
November 14	7:30 p.m.	South Carolina	Ole Miss	Vaught–Hemingway Stadium • Oxford, MS	SECN	MISS 59–42	13,596	
^{#}Rankings from AP Poll released prior to game. All times are in Eastern Time.

Date	Bye Week							
November 14	Alabama	Auburn	Georgia	LSU	Mississippi State	Missouri	Tennessee	Texas A&M

==== Week Nine ====
Date	Time	Visiting team	Home team	Site	TV	Result	Attendance	Ref.
November 21	12:00 p.m.	No. 6 Florida	Vanderbilt	Vanderbilt Stadium • Nashville, TN	ABC	FLA 38–17	1,147	
November 21	12:00 p.m.	LSU	Arkansas	Donald W. Reynolds Razorback Stadium • Fayetteville, AR (Battle for the Golden Boot)	SECN	LSU 27–24	16,500	
November 21	4:00 p.m.	Kentucky	No. 1 Alabama	Bryant–Denny Stadium • Tuscaloosa, AL	SECN	ALA 63–3	19,424	
November 21	7:00 p.m.	Tennessee	No. 23 Auburn	Jordan–Hare Stadium • Auburn, AL (rivalry)	ESPN	AUB 30–17	17,490	
November 21	7:30 p.m.	Mississippi State	No. 13 Georgia	Sanford Stadium • Athens, GA	SECN	UGA 31–24	20,524	
November 21	7:30 p.m.	Missouri	South Carolina	Williams–Brice Stadium • Columbia, SC	SECN	MIZZOU 17–10	13,603	
^{#}Rankings from AP Poll released prior to game. All times are in Eastern Time.

Date	Bye Week	
November 21	Ole Miss	Texas A&M

==== Week Ten ====
Date	Time	Visiting team	Home team	Site	TV	Result	Attendance	Ref.
November 28	12:00 p.m.	Kentucky	No. 6 Florida	Ben Hill Griffin Stadium • Gainesville, FL	ESPN	FLA 34–10	14,453	
November 28^{[d]}	12:00 p.m.	Vanderbilt	Missouri	Faurot Field • Columbia, MO	SECN	MIZZOU 41–0	11,053	
November 28	3:30 p.m.	No. 22 Auburn	No. 1 Alabama	Bryant–Denny Stadium • Tuscaloosa, AL (Iron Bowl)	CBS	ALA 42–13	19,424	
November 28	4:00 p.m.	Mississippi State	Ole Miss	Vaught–Hemingway Stadium • Oxford, MS (Egg Bowl)	SECN	MISS 31–24	16,218	
November 28	7:00 p.m.	LSU	No. 5 Texas A&M	Kyle Field • College Station, TX (rivalry)	ESPN	TAMU 20–7	23,607	
November 28	7:30 p.m.	No. 9 Georgia	South Carolina	Williams–Brice Stadium • Columbia, SC (rivalry)	SECN	UGA 45–16	16,444	
^{#}Rankings from College Football Playoff. All times are in Eastern Time.

^{^[d]}The game between Vanderbilt and Missouri was originally scheduled to take place on October 17. However, due to COVID-19 management requirements in response to positive tests and subsequent quarantine of individuals within the Vanderbilt program, the game was rescheduled for December 12. The game was again rescheduled for November 28 due to scheduling adjustments stemming from positive tests and subsequent quarantining of individuals within the Arkansas football program. The Arkansas–Missouri and Tennessee–Vanderbilt games originally scheduled for November 28 were postponed.

Date	Bye Week	
November 28	Arkansas	Tennessee

==== Week Eleven ====
Date	Time	Visiting team	Home team	Site	TV	Result	Attendance	Ref.
December 5	12:00 p.m.	No. 5 Texas A&M	Auburn	Jordan Hare Stadium • Auburn, AL	ESPN	TAMU 31–20	17,490	
December 5^{[e]}	12:00 p.m.	Arkansas	Missouri	Faurot Field • Columbia, MO (Battle Line Rivalry)	SECN	MIZZOU 50–48	11,378	
December 5	3:30 p.m.	No. 6 Florida	Tennessee	Neyland Stadium • Knoxville, TN (rivalry)	CBS	FLA 31–19	22,943	
December 5	7:30 p.m.	South Carolina	Kentucky	Kroger Field • Lexington, KY	SECN	KEN 41–18	12,000	
December 5^{[f]}	8:00 p.m.	No. 1 Alabama	LSU	Tiger Stadium • Baton Rouge, LA (rivalry)	CBS	ALA 55–17	22,349	
^{#}Rankings from College Football Playoff. All times are in Eastern Time.

Date	Bye Week			
December 5	Georgia	Mississippi State	Ole Miss	Vanderbilt

^{^[e]}The game between Arkansas and Missouri was originally scheduled to take place on November 28. However, due to COVID-19 management requirements in response to positive tests and subsequent quarantine of individuals within the Arkansas program, the game was rescheduled for December 5.
^{^[f]}The game between Alabama and LSU was originally scheduled to take place on November 14. However, due to COVID-19 management requirements in response to positive tests and subsequent quarantine of individuals within the LSU program, the game was rescheduled for December 5.

==== Week Twelve ====
Date	Time	Visiting team	Home team	Site	TV	Result	Attendance	Ref.
December 12^{[g]}	12:00 p.m.	No. 1 Alabama	Arkansas	Donald W. Reynolds Razorback Stadium • Fayetteville, AR	ESPN	ALA 52–3	16,500	
December 12^{[h]}	12:00 p.m.	No. 9 Georgia	No. 25 Missouri	Faurot Field • Columbia, MO	SECN	UGA 49–14	10,830	
December 12^{[i]}	4:00 p.m.	Tennessee	Vanderbilt	Vanderbilt Stadium • Nashville, TN (rivalry)	SECN	TENN 42–17	849	
December 12^{[j]}	7:00 p.m.	LSU	No. 6 Florida	Ben Hill Griffin Stadium • Gainesville, FL (rivalry)	ESPN	LSU 37–34	16,610	
December 12^{[k]}	7:30 p.m.	Auburn	Mississippi State	Davis Wade Stadium • Starkville, MS	SECN	AUB 24–10	12,986	
~~December 12~~^{[l]}	~~8:00 p.m.~~	~~Ole Miss~~	~~No. 5 Texas A&M~~	~~Kyle Field~~ • ~~College Station, TX~~	~~CBS~~	CANCELED		
^{#}Rankings from College Football Playoff. All times are in Eastern Time.

^{^[g]}The game between Alabama and Arkansas was originally scheduled to take place on December 5. However, schedule adjustments stemming from the COVID-19 outbreak in the LSU program caused it to be rescheduled for December 12.
^{^[h]}The game between Georgia and Missouri was originally scheduled to take place on November 14. However, due to COVID-19 management requirements in response to positive tests and subsequent quarantine of individuals within the Missouri program, the game was rescheduled for December 12.
^{^[i]}The game between Tennessee and Vanderbilt was originally scheduled to take place on November 28. However, schedule adjustments stemming from the COVID-19 outbreak in the Arkansas program caused it to be rescheduled for December 12.
^{^[j]}The game between LSU and Florida was originally scheduled to take place on October 17. However, due to COVID-19 management requirements in response to positive tests and subsequent quarantine of individuals within the Florida program, the game was rescheduled for December 12.
^{^[k]}The game between Auburn and Mississippi State was originally scheduled to take place on November 14. However, due to COVID-19 management requirements in response to positive tests and subsequent quarantine of individuals within the Mississippi State program, the game was rescheduled for December 12.
^{^[l]}The game between Ole Miss and Texas A&M was originally scheduled to take place on November 21. However, due to COVID-19 management requirements in response to positive tests and subsequent quarantine of individuals within the Texas A&M program, the game was rescheduled for December 12. On December 7, the game was again postponed, this time due to a combination of positive tests, contact tracing and subsequent quarantining of individuals within the Ole Miss program. Because both teams had games already scheduled for December 19, the game was declared a no-contest.

==== Week Thirteen ====
Date	Time	Visiting team	Home team	Site	TV	Result	Attendance	Ref.
December 19^{[m]}	12:00 p.m.	No. 5 Texas A&M	Tennessee	Neyland Stadium • Knoxville, TN	ESPN	TAMU 34–13	22,645	
December 19^{[n]}	3:30 p.m.	Ole Miss	LSU	Tiger Stadium • Baton Rouge, LA (Magnolia Bowl)	SECN	LSU 53–48	21,905	
December 19^{[o]}	3:30 p.m.	Missouri	Mississippi State	Davis Wade Stadium • Starkville, MS	SECN	MISS ST 51–32	11,748	
~~December 19~~^{[p]}	~~12:00 p.m.~~	~~Vanderbilt~~	~~No. 8 Georgia~~	~~Sanford Stadium~~ • ~~Athens, GA~~ (~~rivalry~~)	~~SECN~~	CANCELED		
^{#}Rankings from College Football Playoff. All times are in Eastern Time.

^{^[m]}The game between Texas A&M and Tennessee was originally scheduled to take place on November 14. However, due to COVID-19 management requirements in response to positive tests and subsequent quarantine of individuals within the Texas A&M program, the game was rescheduled for December 12. The game was again rescheduled for December 19 due to scheduling adjustments stemming from multiple game postponements.
^{^[n]}The game between Ole Miss and LSU was originally scheduled to take place on December 5. However, schedule adjustments stemming from the COVID-19 outbreak in the LSU program caused it to be rescheduled for December 19.
^{^[o]}The game between Missouri and Mississippi State was originally scheduled to take place on December 5. However, schedule adjustments stemming from the COVID-19 outbreak in the Arkansas program caused it to be rescheduled for December 19.
^{^[p]}The game between Vanderbilt and Georgia was originally scheduled to take place on December 5. However, due to COVID-19 management requirements in response to Vanderbilt's football squad size and position availability falling below roster minimum requirements, the game was rescheduled for December 19. On December 14, the game was declared a no-contest, again due to COVID-19 management requirements in response to Vanderbilt's football squad size and position availability falling below roster minimum requirements.

=== Championship game ===
Date	Time	Visiting team	Home team	Site	TV	Result	Attendance	Ref.
December 19	8:00 p.m.	No. 1 Alabama	No. 7 Florida	Mercedes-Benz Stadium • Atlanta, GA (rivalry)	CBS	ALA 52–46	16,000	
^{#}Rankings from College Football Playoff. All times are in Eastern Time.

== Postseason ==
=== Bowl Games ===
Legend
SEC win
SEC loss

Bowl game	Date	Site	Television	Time (EST)	SEC team	Opponent	Score	Attendance
Armed Forces Bowl	December 31	Amon G. Carter Stadium • Fort Worth, TX	ESPN	12:00 p.m.	Mississippi State	No. 24 Tulsa	W 28–26	9,000
Citrus Bowl	January 1	Camping World Stadium • Orlando, FL	ABC	1:00 p.m.	Auburn	No. 14 Northwestern	L 19–35	15,698
Gator Bowl	January 2	TIAA Bank Field • Jacksonville, FL	ESPN	12:00 p.m.	Kentucky	No. 23 NC State	W 23–21	10,422
Outback Bowl	January 2	Raymond James Stadium • Tampa, FL	ABC	12:30 p.m.	Ole Miss	No. 11 Indiana	W 26–20	11,025
New Year's Six bowl games
Cotton Bowl Classic	December 30	AT&T Stadium • Arlington, TX	ESPN	8:00 p.m.	No. 7 Florida	No. 6 Oklahoma	L 20–55	17,323
Peach Bowl	January 1	Mercedes-Benz Stadium • Atlanta, GA	ESPN	12:00 p.m.	No. 9 Georgia	No. 8 Cincinnati	W 24–21	15,301
Orange Bowl	January 2	Hard Rock Stadium • Miami Gardens, FL	ESPN	8:00 p.m.	No. 5 Texas A&M	No. 13 North Carolina	W 41–27	13,737
College Football Playoff bowl games
Rose Bowl (CFP Semifinal)	January 1	AT&T Stadium • Arlington, TX	ESPN	4:00 p.m.	No. 1 Alabama	No. 4 Notre Dame	W 31–14	18,373
College Football Playoff National Championship	January 11	Hard Rock Stadium • Miami Gardens, FL	ESPN	8:00 p.m.	No. 1 Alabama	No. 3 Ohio State	W 52–24	14,926

== Head to head matchups ==
Head to head
Team	Alabama	Arkansas	Auburn	Florida	Georgia	LSU	Kentucky	Missouri	Mississippi State	Ole Miss	South Carolina	Tennessee	Texas A&M	Vanderbilt
Alabama	—	0-1	0-1	0-1	0-1	0-1	0-1	0-1	0-1	0-1		0-1	0-1	
Arkansas	1-0	—	1-0	1-0	1-0	1-0		1-0	0-1	0-1		0-1	1-0	
Auburn	1-0	0-1	—		1-0	0-1	0-1		0-1	0-1	1-0	0-1	1-0	
Florida	1-0	0-1		—	0-1	1-0	0-1	0-1		0-1	0-1	0-1	1-0	0-1
Georgia	1-0	0-1	0-1	1-0	—		0-1	0-1	0-1		0-1	0-1		
LSU	1-0	0-1	1-0	0-1		—		1-0	1-0	0-1	0-1		1-0	0-1
Kentucky	1-0		1-0	1-0	1-0		—	1-0	0-1	1-0	0-1	0-1		0-1
Missouri	1-0	0-1		1-0	1-0	0-1	0-1	—	1-0		0-1	1-0		0-1
Mississippi State	1-0	1-0	1-0		1-0	0-1	1-0	0-1	—	1-0			1-0	0-1
Ole Miss	1-0	1-0	1-0	1-0		1-0	0-1		0-1	—	0-1			0-1
South Carolina			0-1	1-0	1-0	1-0	1-0	1-0		1-0	—	1-0	1-0	0-1
Tennessee	1-0	1-0	1-0	1-0	1-0		1-0	0-1			0-1	—	1-0	0-1
Texas A&M	1-0	0-1	0-1	0-1		0-1			0-1		0-1	0-1	—	0-1
Vanderbilt				1-0		1-0	1-0	1-0	1-0	1-0	1-0	1-0	1-0	—

Updated with the results of all games through December 4, 2020.

== SEC records vs Other Conferences ==
2019–2020 records against non-conference foes:

=== SEC vs Power Five Matchups ===
Date	Conference	Visitor	Home	Site	Score
Canceled	Big 12	Baylor	Ole Miss	NRG Stadium • Houston, TX	
Canceled	ACC	Virginia	Georgia	Mercedes-Benz Stadium • Atlanta, GA	
Canceled	ACC	North Carolina	Auburn	Mercedes-Benz Stadium • Atlanta, GA	
Canceled	Big 12	Texas	LSU	Tiger Stadium • Baton Rouge, LA	
Canceled	ACC	Mississippi State	NC State	Carter–Finley Stadium • Raleigh, NC	
Canceled	Big 12	Tennessee	Oklahoma	Gaylord Family Oklahoma Memorial Stadium • Norman, OK	
Canceled	ACC	Arkansas	Notre Dame	Notre Dame Stadium • Notre Dame, IN	
Canceled	Big 12	Vanderbilt	Kansas State	Bill Snyder Family Football Stadium • Manhattan, KS	
Canceled	Independent	Missouri	BYU	LaVell Edwards Stadium • Provo, UT	
Canceled	ACC	Florida	Florida State	Doak Campbell Stadium • Tallahassee, FL	
Canceled	ACC	Georgia Tech	Georgia	Sanford Stadium • Athens, GA	
Canceled	ACC	Kentucky	Louisville	Cardinal Stadium • Louisville, KY	
Canceled	ACC	South Carolina	Clemson	Memorial Stadium • Clemson, SC	

=== SEC vs Group of Five Matchups ===
Date	Conference	Visitor	Home	Site	Score
Canceled	Mountain West	Nevada	Arkansas	Donald W. Reynolds Razorback Stadium • Fayetteville, AR	
Canceled	MAC	Eastern Michigan	Kentucky	Kroger Field • Lexington, KY	
Canceled	C-USA	UTSA	LSU	Tiger Stadium • Baton Rouge, LA	
Canceled	Mountain West	New Mexico	Mississippi State	Davis Wade Stadium • Starkville, MS	
Canceled	Sun Belt	Coastal Carolina	South Carolina	Williams–Brice Stadium • Columbia, SC	
Canceled	C-USA	Charlotte	Tennessee	Neyland Stadium • Knoxville, TN	
Canceled	American	East Carolina	South Carolina	Williams–Brice Stadium • Columbia, SC	
Canceled	C-USA	North Texas	Texas A&M	Kyle Field • College Station, TX	
Canceled	Sun Belt	Georgia State	Alabama	Bryant–Denny Stadium • Tuscaloosa, AL	
Canceled	Sun Belt	South Alabama	Florida	Ben Hill Griffin Stadium • Gainesville, FL	
Canceled	MAC	Kent State	Kentucky	Kroger Field • Lexington, KY	
Canceled	C-USA	LSU	Rice	NRG Stadium • Houston, TX	
Canceled	MAC	Kent State	Alabama	Bryant–Denny Stadium • Tuscaloosa, AL	
Canceled	C-USA	Southern Miss	Auburn	Jordan–Hare Stadium • Auburn, AL	
Canceled	Sun Belt	Louisiana–Monroe	Georgia	Sanford Stadium • Athens, GA	
Canceled	American	Tulane	Mississippi State	Davis Wade Stadium • Starkville, MS	
Canceled	MAC	Eastern Michigan	Missouri	Faurot Field • Columbia, MO	
Canceled	Mountain West	Colorado State	Vanderbilt	Vanderbilt Stadium • Nashville, TN	
Canceled	Mountain West	Fresno State	Texas A&M	Kyle Field • College Station, TX	
Canceled	Sun Belt	Georgia Southern	Ole Miss	Vaught–Hemingway Stadium • Oxford, MS	
Canceled	Sun Belt	Louisiana–Monroe	Arkansas	Donald W. Reynolds Razorback Stadium • Fayetteville, AR	
Canceled	Sun Belt	Louisiana	Missouri	Faurot Field • Columbia, MO	
Canceled	Sun Belt	Troy	Tennessee	Neyland Stadium • Knoxville, TN	
Canceled	C-USA	Louisiana Tech	Vanderbilt	Vanderbilt Stadium • Nashville, TN	

=== SEC vs FBS Independents matchups ===
(Excluding BYU)

Date	Visitor	Home	Site	Score
Canceled	UConn	Ole Miss	Vaught–Hemingway Stadium • Oxford, MS	
Canceled	UMass	Auburn	Jordan–Hare Stadium • Auburn, AL	
Canceled	New Mexico State	Florida	Ben Hill Griffin Stadium • Gainesville, FL	

== Awards and honors ==
=== Player of the week honors ===
Week	Offensive			Defensive			Offensive Line			Defensive Line			Specialist			Freshman		
Week	Player	Team	Position	Player	Team	Position	Player	Team	Position	Player	Team	Position	Player	Team	Position	Player	Team	Position
Week 1 (Sept. 28)	K. J. Costello	Mississippi State	QB	Ventrell Miller	Florida	LB	Brett Heggie	Florida	C	Deandre Johnson	Tennessee	DE	Jake Camarda	Georgia	P	Jaylin Simpson	Auburn	DB
Week 2 (Oct. 5)	Mac Jones	Alabama	QB	Bumper Pool; Joe Foucha	Arkansas	LB; DB	Ben Cleveland	Georgia	OG	Zachary Carter	Florida	DL	Mac Brown	Ole Miss	P	Malachi Moore	Alabama	DB
Week 3 (Oct. 12)	Kellen Mond; Najee Harris	Texas A&M; Alabama	QB; RB	Jordan Wright	Kentucky	LB	Sadarius Hutcherson	South Carolina	OG	Azeez Ojulari	Georgia	DL	Max Duffy	Kentucky	P	Connor Bazelak	Missouri	QB
Week 4 (Oct. 19)	Mac Jones	Alabama	QB	Grant Morgan; Jaycee Horn	Arkansas; South Carolina	LB; DB	Landon Young	Kentucky	OT	Jayden Peevy	Texas A&M	DT	Kai Kroeger	South Carolina	P	Hudson Clark	Arkansas	DB
Week 5 (Oct. 26)	Mac Jones; Seth Williams	Alabama; Auburn	QB; WR	Nick Bolton	Missouri	LB	Case Cook	Missouri	OL	BJ Ojulari	LSU	DE	Trey Palmer	LSU	RS	Tank Bigsby	Auburn	RB/RS
Week 6 (Nov. 2)	Matt Corral	Ole Miss	QB	Richard LeCounte	Georgia	S	Carson Green	Texas A&M	OT	Derick Hall	Auburn	DL	Jake Camarda	Georgia	P	Malachi Moore	DB	Alabama
Week 7 (Nov. 9)	Kyle Trask	Florida	QB	Jalen Catalon	Arkansas	DB	Dan Moore	Texas A&M	OT	Marquiss Spencer	Mississippi State	DT	Evan McPherson	Florida	K	De’Von Achane	Texas A&M	RB
Week 8 (Nov. 16)	Kyle Trask; Matt Corral	Florida; Ole Miss	QB	Jamin Davis	Kentucky	LB	Landon Young; Nick Broeker	Kentucky; Ole Miss	OT; OL	Zachary Carter	Florida	DL	Chance Poore	Kentucky	K	J. J. Weaver	Kentucky	LB
Week 9 (Nov. 23)	DeVonta Smith; J. T. Daniels	Alabama; Georgia	WR; QB	Smoke Monday	Auburn	DB	Nick Brahms	Auburn	OL	Andre Anthony; Kyree Campbell	LSU; Florida	DE	Grant McKinniss	Missouri	P	Jermaine Burton	Georgia	WR
Week 10 (Nov. 30)	Mac Jones; Matt Corral	Alabama; Ole Miss	QB	Buddy Johnson	Texas A&M	LB	Ben Cleveland	Georgia	OG	DeMarvin Leal	Texas A&M	DL/DE	Kadarius Toney; Sarah Fuller	Florida; Vanderbilt	PR; K	Connor Bazelak	Missouri	QB
Week 11 (Dec. 7)	DeVonta Smith	Alabama	WR	Ventrell Miller	Florida	LB	Ryan McCollum	Texas A&M	C	Phil Hoskins	Kentucky	DT	Harrison Mevis	Missouri	K	Connor Bazelak	Missouri	QB
Week 12 (Dec. 14)	Max Johnson	LSU	QB	Bryce Thompson; Eric Stokes	Tennessee; Georgia	S DB	Alex Leatherwood	Alabama	LT	Derick Hall	Auburn	DL	Cade York; DeVonta Smith	LSU; Alabama	K WR/RS	Tank Bigsby	Auburn	RB

=== SEC Individual awards ===
The following individuals received postseason honors as voted by the Southeastern Conference football coaches at the end of the season

Award	Player	School
Offensive Player of the Year	DeVonta Smith, WR, Sr.	Alabama
Defensive Player of the Year	Patrick Surtain II, CB, Jr.	Alabama
Special Teams Player of the Year	Jake Camarda, P, Jr.	Georgia
Freshman of the Year	Connor Bazelak, QB; Tank Bigsby, RB	Missouri; Auburn
Jacobs Blocking Trophy	Landon Dickerson, OL, R-Sr. Alex Leatherwood, OL, Sr.	Alabama
Scholar Athlete of the Year	Mac Jones, QB, Jr.	Alabama
Coach of the Year	Nick Saban	Alabama

=== All-conference teams ===
Position	Player	Team
First Team Offense
WR	DeVonta Smith	Alabama
WR	Elijah Moore	Ole Miss
OL	Alex Leatherwood	Alabama
OL	Landon Young	Kentucky
OL	Ben Cleveland	Georgia
OL	Trey Smith	Tennessee
OL	Deonte Brown	Alabama
C	Landon Dickerson	Alabama
TE	Kyle Pitts	Florida
QB	Mac Jones	Alabama
RB	Najee Harris	Alabama
RB	Isaiah Spiller	Texas A&M
AP	Kadarius Toney	Florida
First Team Defense
DL	Christian Barmore	Alabama
DL	Kingsley Enagbare	South Carolina
DL	Trajan Jeffcoat	Missouri
DL	Bobby Brown III	Texas A&M
LB	Nick Bolton	Missouri
LB	Dylan Moses	Alabama
LB	Grant Morgan	Arkansas
DB	Patrick Surtain II	Alabama
DB	Kaiir Elam	Florida
DB	Richard LeCounte	Georgia
DB	Derek Stingley Jr.	LSU
First Team Special Teams
K	Cade York	LSU
P	Jake Camarda	Georgia
RS	Kadarius Toney	Florida

Position	Player	Team
Second Team Offense
WR	Kadarius Toney	Florida
WR	Treylon Burks	Arkansas
OL	Darian Kinnard	Kentucky
OL	Kenyon Green	Texas A&M
OL	Dan Moore	Texas A&M
OL	Carson Green	Texas A&M
C	Drake Jackson	Kentucky
TE	Jalen Wydermyer	Texas A&M
QB	Kyle Trask	Florida
RB	Kevin Harris	South Carolina
RB	Larry Rountree III	Missouri
AP	Jerrion Ealy	Ole Miss
Second Team Defense
DL	Big Kat Bryant	Auburn
DL	Jordan Davis	Georgia
DL	Dayo Odeyingbo	Vanderbilt
DL	Ali Gaye	LSU
LB	Azeez Ojulari	Georgia
LB	Bumper Pool	Arkansas
LB	Christopher Allen	Alabama
DB	Eric Stokes	Georgia
DB	Malachi Moore	Alabama
DB	Jalen Catalon	Arkansas
DB	Jaycee Horn	South Carolina
Second Team Special Teams
K	Anders Carlson	Auburn
P	Zach Von Rosenberg	LSU
RS	Jaylen Waddle	Alabama

=== All-Americans ===
The 2020 College Football All-America Teams are composed of the following College Football All-American first teams chosen by the following selector organizations: Associated Press (AP), Football Writers Association of America (FWAA), American Football Coaches Association (AFCA), Walter Camp Foundation (WCFF), The Sporting News (TSN), Sports Illustrated (SI), USA Today (USAT) ESPN, CBS Sports (CBS), FOX Sports (FOX) College Football News (CFN), Bleacher Report (BR), Scout.com, Phil Steele (PS), SB Nation (SB), Athlon Sports, Pro Football Focus (PFF) and Yahoo! Sports (Yahoo!).

Currently, the NCAA compiles consensus all-America teams in the sports of Division I-FBS football and Division I men's basketball using a point system computed from All-America teams named by coaches associations or media sources. The system consists of three points for a first-team honor, two points for second-team honor, and one point for third-team honor. Honorable mention and fourth team or lower recognitions are not accorded any points. Football consensus teams are compiled by position and the player accumulating the most points at each position is named first team consensus all-American. Currently, the NCAA recognizes All-Americans selected by the AP, AFCA, FWAA, TSN, and the WCFF to determine Consensus and Unanimous All-Americans. Any player named to the First Team by all five of the NCAA-recognized selectors is deemed a Unanimous All-American.

Position	Player	School	Selector	Unanimous	Consensus
First Team All-Americans
QB	Mac Jones	Alabama	AFCA, AP, Athletic, ESPN, TSN, USAT, WCFF		*
QB	Kyle Trask	Florida	CBS		
RB	Najee Harris	Alabama	AFCA, AP, CBS, ESPN, FWAA, PS, TSN, WCFF	*	*
WR	Elijah Moore	Ole Miss	AFCA, AP, Athletic, CBS, PS, TSN, WCFF		*
WR	DeVonta Smith	Alabama	AFCA, AP, Athletic, CBS, ESPN, FWAA, PS, TSN, WCFF, USAT	*	*
TE	Kyle Pitts	Florida	AFCA, AP, Athletic, CBS, ESPN, FWAA, PS, TSN, WCFF, USAT	*	*
OL	Landon Dickerson	Alabama	AFCA, AP, CBS, ESPN, FWAA, PS, TSN, WCFF	*	*
OL	Kenyon Green	Texas A&M	Athletic, FWAA, PS, TSN		*
OL	Alex Leatherwood	Alabama	AFCA, AP, Athletic, CBS, ESPN, FWAA, PS, TSN, WCFF, USAT	*	*
DL	Christian Barmore	Alabama	CBS		
LB	Dylan Moses	Alabama	AFCA		
DB	Derek Stingley Jr.	LSU	AFCA		
DB	Eric Stokes	Georgia	CBS		
DB	Patrick Surtain II	Alabama	AFCA, AP, Athletic, CBS, ESPN, FWAA, PS, TSN, WCFF, USAT	*	*
K	Will Reichard	Alabama	CBS		
P	Zach Von Rosenberg	LSU	Athletic		
AP/RS	DeVonta Smith	Alabama	CBS		
AP/RS	Kadarius Toney	Florida	Athletic		
LS	Thomas Fletcher	Alabama	PS		

Position	Player	School	Selector	Unanimous	Consensus
Second Team All-Americans
QB	Mac Jones	Alabama	CBS, FWAA, PS		
QB	Kyle Trask	Florida	AP, TSN, USAT		
RB	Najee Harris	Alabama	USAT		
WR	Elijah Moore	Ole Miss	USAT		
OL	Trey Smith	Tennessee	AFCA, FWAA, PS		
OL	Kenyon Green	Texas A&M	AFCA, AP, WCFF		
OL	Darian Kinnard	Kentucky	CBS, TSN		
OL	Landon Dickerson	Alabama	USAT		
DL	Jordan Davis	Georgia	AFCA		
DL	Christian Barmore	Alabama	USAT		
LB	Nick Bolton	Missouri	AFCA, AP, CBS, FWAA, PS, WCFF		
LB	Grant Morgan	Arkansas	AFCA, WCFF		
LB	Dylan Moses	Alabama	CBS		
DB	Derek Stingley Jr.	LSU	TSN		
K	Anders Carlson	Auburn	AFCA		
K	Cade York	LSU	FWAA, PS		
K	Will Reichard	Alabama	TSN		
P	Jake Camarda	Georgia	AFCA, FWAA, PS, WCFF		
AP/RS	Kadarius Toney	Florida	AP, CBS		

Position	Player	School	Selector	Unanimous	Consensus
Third Team All-Americans
QB	Kyle Trask	Florida	PS		
OL	Darian Kinnard	Kentucky	AP		
OL	Ben Cleveland	Georgia	AP		
OL	Jalen Wydermyer	Texas A&M	PS		
DL	Christian Barmore	Alabama	AP		
LB	Dylan Moses	Alabama	AP, PS		
LB	Grant Morgan	Arkansas	PS		
DB	Eli Ricks	LSU	AP		
S	Jalen Catalon	Arkansas	PS		
P	Jake Camarda	Georgia	AP		

Position	Player	School	Selector	Unanimous	Consensus
Fourth Team All-Americans
RB	Isaiah Spiller	Texas A&M	PS		
OL	Darian Kinnard	Kentucky	PS		
DL	DeMarvin Leal	Texas A&M	PS		
DL	Christian Barmore	Alabama	PS		
LB	Azeez Ojulari	Georgia	PS		
DB	Derek Stingley Jr.	LSU	PS		
DB	Eric Stokes	Georgia	PS		
K	Will Reichard	Alabama	PS		
AP	Kadarius Toney	Florida	PS		

=== National award winners ===
Landon Dickerson

- Rimington Trophy

Thomas Fletcher

- Patrick Mannelly Award

Najee Harris

- Doak Walker Award

Mac Jones

- Davey O'Brien Award
- Johnny Unitas Golden Arm Award
- Manning Award

Alex Leatherwood

- Outland Trophy

Kyle Pitts

- John Mackey Award

DeVonta Smith

- AP Player of the Year
- Fred Biletnikoff Award
- Heisman Trophy
- Maxwell Award
- Paul Hornung Award
- Sporting News Player of the Year
- Walter Camp Award

== NFL draft ==
A total of 65 SEC players were drafted in the 2021 NFL Draft, the most of any conference that year.

Team	Round 1	Round 2	Round 3	Round 4	Round 5	Round 6	Round 7	Total
Alabama	6	2	–	–	–	2	–	10
Arkansas	–	–	–	–	–	1	–	1
Auburn	–	–	1	–	2	1	–	4
Florida	2	1	–	1	3	1	–	8
Georgia	1	2	3	–	1	1	1	9
Kentucky	1	1	–	–	–	3	1	6
LSU	1	1	–	2	–	2	1	7
Mississippi State	–	–	–	–	–	–	2	2
Missouri	–	1	–	1	1	2	–	5
Ole Miss	–	1	–	1	–	–	–	2
South Carolina	1	–	1	–	–	2	–	4
Tennessee	–	–	1	–	–	1	–	2
Texas A&M	–	–	1	3	–	–	–	4
Vanderbilt	–	1	–	–	–	–	–	1

The following list includes all SEC players drafted in the 2021 NFL draft:

Round #	Pick #	NFL team	Player	Position	College
1	4	Atlanta Falcons	Kyle Pitts	TE	Florida
1	5	Cincinnati Bengals	Ja'Marr Chase	WR	LSU
1	6	Miami Dolphins	Jaylen Waddle	WR	Alabama
1	8	Carolina Panthers	Jaycee Horn	CB	South Carolina
1	9	Denver Broncos	Patrick Surtain II	CB	Alabama
1	10	Philadelphia Eagles	DeVonta Smith	WR	Alabama
1	15	New England Patriots	Mac Jones	QB	Alabama
1	17	Las Vegas Raiders	Alex Leatherwood	OT	Alabama
1	19	Washington Football Team	Jamin Davis	LB	Kentucky
1	20	New York Giants	Kadarius Toney	WR	Florida
1	24	Pittsburgh Steelers	Najee Harris	RB	Alabama
1	29	Green Bay Packers	Eric Stokes	CB	Georgia
2	33	Jacksonville Jaguars	Tyson Campbell	CB	Georgia
2	34	New York Jets	Elijah Moore	WR	Ole Miss
2	37	Philadelphia Eagles	Landon Dickerson	C	Alabama
2	38	New England Patriots	Christian Barmore	DT	Alabama
2	44	Dallas Cowboys	Kelvin Joseph	CB	Kentucky
2	50	New York Giants	Azeez Ojulari	OLB	Georgia
2	54	Indianapolis Colts	Dayo Odeyingbo	DE	Vanderbilt
2	58	Kansas City Chiefs	Nick Bolton	ILB	Missouri
2	59	Carolina Panthers	Terrace Marshall Jr.	WR	LSU
2	64	Tampa Bay Buccaneers	Kyle Trask	QB	Florida
3	66	Minnesota Vikings	Kellen Mond	QB	Texas A&M
3	77	Los Angeles Chargers	Josh Palmer	WR	Tennessee
3	91	Cleveland Browns	Anthony Schwartz	WR	Auburn
3	92	Tennessee Titans	Monty Rice	ILB	Georgia
3	94	Baltimore Ravens	Ben Cleveland	OG	Georgia
3	97	Los Angeles Chargers	Tre' McKitty	TE	Georgia
3	103	Los Angeles Rams	Ernest Jones	ILB	South Carolina
4	115	Dallas Cowboys	Jabril Cox	ILB	LSU
4	117	Los Angeles Rams	Bobby Brown III	DT	Texas A&M
4	122	Cincinnati Bengals	Tyler Shelvin	DT	LSU
4	128	Pittsburgh Steelers	Dan Moore	OT	Texas A&M
4	136	Arizona Cardinals	Marco Wilson	CB	Florida
4	140	Pittsburgh Steelers	Buddy Johnson	ILB	Texas A&M
4	142	Green Bay Packers	Royce Newman	OG	Ole Miss
4	143	Las Vegas Raiders	Tyree Gillespie	S	Missouri
5	146	New York Jets	Jamien Sherwood	S	Auburn
5	149	Cincinnati Bengals	Evan McPherson	K	Florida
5	151	Chicago Bears	Larry Borom	OT	Missouri
5	165	Indianapolis Colts	Shawn Davis	S	Florida
5	169	Cleveland Browns	Richard LeCounte	S	Georgia
5	173	Green Bay Packers	Tedarrell Slaton	DT	Florida
5	176	Tampa Bay Buccaneers	K. J. Britt	ILB	Auburn
6	188	New England Patriots	Joshuah Bledsoe	S	Missouri
6	190	Cincinnati Bengals	Trey Hill	C	Georgia
6	192	Dallas Cowboys	Quinton Bohanna	DT	Kentucky
6	193	Carolina Panthers	Deonte Brown	OG	Alabama
6	198	Los Angeles Chargers	Larry Rountree III	RB	Missouri
6	200	New York Jets	Brandin Echols	CB	Kentucky
6	204	Carolina Panthers	Shi Smith	WR	South Carolina
6	205	Tennessee Titans	Racey McMath	WR	LSU
6	206	New Orleans Saints	Landon Young	OT	Kentucky
6	207	New York Jets	Jonathan Marshall	DT	Arkansas
6	208	Seattle Seahawks	Stone Forsythe	OT	Florida
6	219	Denver Broncos	Seth Williams	WR	Auburn
6	222	Carolina Panthers	Thomas Fletcher	LS	Alabama
6	224	Philadelphia Eagles	JaCoby Stevens	S	LSU
6	226	Kansas City Chiefs	Trey Smith	OG	Tennessee
6	227	Dallas Cowboys	Israel Mukuamu	CB	South Carolina
7	232	Carolina Panthers	Phil Hoskins	DT	Kentucky
7	237	Denver Broncos	Kary Vincent Jr.	CB	LSU
7	241	Los Angeles Chargers	Mark Webb	S	Georgia
7	253	Denver Broncos	Marquiss Spencer	DE	Mississippi State
7	256	Green Bay Packers	Kylin Hill	RB	Mississippi State
