= 2020 All-SEC football team =

American college football all-star team

The 2020 All-SEC football team consists of American football players selected to the All-Southeastern Conference (SEC) chosen by the Associated Press (AP) and the conference coaches for the 2020 Southeastern Conference football season.

Alabama won the conference, beating Florida 52–46 in the SEC Championship.

Alabama wide receiver DeVonta Smith was voted the SEC Offensive Player of the Year (AP and Coaches). Alabama defensive back Patrick Surtain II was voted the SEC Defensive Player of the Year (AP and Coaches). Georgia punter Jake Camarda was voted SEC Special Teams Player of the Year (Coaches). Auburn running back Tank Bigsby was voted SEC Newcomer/Freshman of the Year (AP and Coaches), with Missouri quarterback Connor Bazelak sharing the honor from the Coaches vote. Nick Saban of Alabama was voted SEC Coach of the Year (AP and Coaches) for the fifth time.

== Offensive selections ==
=== Quarterbacks ===
- Mac Jones, Alabama (AP-1, Coaches-1)
- Kyle Trask, Florida (AP-2, Coaches-2)

=== Running backs ===
- Najee Harris, Alabama (AP-1, Coaches-1)
- Kevin Harris, South Carolina (AP-1, Coaches-2)
- Isaiah Spiller, Texas A&M (AP-2, Coaches-1)
- Larry Rountree III, Missouri (Coaches-2)
- Tank Bigsby, Auburn (AP-2)

=== Wide receivers ===
- Elijah Moore, Ole Miss (AP-1, Coaches-1)
- DeVonta Smith, Alabama (AP-1, Coaches-1)
- Treylon Burks, Arkansas (AP-2, Coaches-2)
- Kadarius Toney, Florida (AP-2, Coaches-2)

=== Centers ===
- Landon Dickerson, Alabama (AP-1, Coaches-1)
- Drake Jackson, Kentucky (AP-2, Coaches-2)

=== Guards ===
- Ben Cleveland, Georgia (AP-1, Coaches-1)
- Trey Smith, Tennessee (AP-1, Coaches-1)
- Deonte Brown, Alabama (AP-2, Coaches-1)
- Kenyon Green, Texas A&M (AP-2, Coaches-2)

=== Tackles ===
- Alex Leatherwood, Alabama (AP-1, Coaches-1)
- Darian Kinnard, Kentucky (AP-1, Coaches-2)
- Carson Green, Texas A&M (AP-2, Coaches-2)
- Dan Moore Jr., Texas A&M (Coaches-2)
- Landon Young, Kentucky (AP-2, Coaches-1)

=== Tight ends ===
- Kyle Pitts, Florida (AP-1, Coaches-1)
- Jalen Wydermyer, Texas A&M (AP-2, Coaches-2)

== Defensive selections ==
=== Defensive ends ===
- Trajan Jeffcoat, Missouri (AP-1, Coaches-1)
- Dayo Odeyingbo, Vanderbilt (AP-1, Coaches-2)
- Ali Gaye, LSU (AP-2, Coaches-2)
- Brenton Cox Jr., Florida (AP-2)

=== Defensive tackles ===
- Christian Barmore, Alabama (AP-1, Coaches-1)
- Bobby Brown III, Texas A&M (AP-1, Coaches-1)
- Kingsley Enagbare, South Carolina (AP-2, Coaches-1)
- Big Kat Bryant, Auburn (Coaches-2)
- Jordan Davis, Georgia (Coaches-2)
- Jonathan Marshall, Arkansas (AP-2)

=== Linebackers ===
- Nick Bolton, Missouri (AP-1, Coaches-1)
- Grant Morgan, Arkansas (AP-1, Coaches-1)
- Dylan Moses, Alabama (Coaches-1)
- Monty Rice, Georgia (AP-1)
- Azeez Ojulari, Georgia (AP-2, Coaches-2)
- Christopher Allen, Alabama (Coaches-2)
- Will Anderson Jr., Alabama (AP-2)
- Henry To'oTo'o, Tennessee (AP-2)
- Bumper Pool, Arkansas (Coaches-2)

=== Cornerbacks ===
- Patrick Surtain II, Alabama (AP-1, Coaches-1)
- Eric Stokes, Georgia (AP-1, Coaches-2)
- Derek Stingley Jr., LSU (Coaches-1)
- Kaiir Elam, Florida (AP-2)
- Eli Ricks, LSU (AP-2)

=== Safeties ===
- Richard LeCounte, Georgia (AP-1, Coaches-1)
- Jalen Catalon, Arkansas (AP-1, Coaches-2)
- Malachi Moore, Alabama (AP-2, Coaches-2)
- Smoke Monday, Auburn (AP-2)

== Special teams ==
=== Kickers ===
- Anders Carlson, Auburn (AP-1, Coaches-2)
- Cade York, LSU (AP-2, Coaches-1)

=== Punters ===
- Jake Camarda, Georgia (AP-1, Coaches-1)
- Max Duffy, Kentucky (AP-2)
- Zach Von Rosenberg, LSU (Coaches-2)

=== All purpose/return specialist ===
- Kadarius Toney, Florida (AP-1, Coaches-1)
- Jerrion Ealy, Ole Miss (AP-2, Coaches-2)
- Jaylen Waddle, Alabama (Coaches-2)

== Key ==
Bold = Consensus first-team selection by both the coaches and AP

AP = Associated Press

Coaches = Selected by the SEC coaches

== See also ==
- 2020 Southeastern Conference football season
- 2020 College Football All-America Team
- Southeastern Conference football individual awards
