= 2020 Mississippi State Bulldogs football team =

American college football season

2020 Mississippi State Bulldogs football

Armed Forces Bowl champion

Armed Forces Bowl, W 28–26 vs. Tulsa
- Conference: Southeastern Conference
- Western Division
- Record: 4–7 (3–7 SEC)
- Head coach: Mike Leach (1st season)
- Offensive scheme: Air raid
- Defensive coordinator: Zach Arnett (1st season)
- Base defense: 3–3–5
- Home stadium: Davis Wade Stadium

2020 Southeastern Conference football standings
	Conf.			Overall
Team	W		L	W		L
Eastern Division
No. 13 Florida x	8	–	2	8	–	4
No. 7 Georgia	7	–	2	8	–	2
Missouri	5	–	5	5	–	5
Kentucky	4	–	6	5	–	6
Tennessee*	3	–	7	3	–	7
South Carolina	2	–	8	2	–	8
Vanderbilt	0	–	9	0	–	9
Western Division
No. 1 Alabama x$#^	10	–	0	13	–	0
No. 4 Texas A&M	8	–	1	9	–	1
Auburn	6	–	4	6	–	5
LSU*	5	–	5	5	–	5
Ole Miss	4	–	5	5	–	5
Arkansas	3	–	7	3	–	7
Mississippi State	3	–	7	4	–	7
Championship: Alabama 52, Florida 46
# – College Football Playoff champion; ^ – College Football Playoff participant; $ – Conference champion; x – Division champion/co-champions; * – Tennessee vacated all wins due to NCAA violations. LSU was ineligible for postseason due to self imposed ban. Note: Due to COVID-19, the SEC played a conference-only schedule.; Rankings from AP Poll.

The 2020 Mississippi State Bulldogs football team represented Mississippi State University in the 2020 NCAA Division I FBS football season. The Bulldogs played their home games at Davis Wade Stadium in Starkville, Mississippi, and competed in the Western Division of the Southeastern Conference (SEC). They were led by first-year head coach Mike Leach.

In a season impacted by the COVID-19 pandemic, the Bulldogs compiled a 3–7 record in a 10-game all-SEC schedule. As the NCAA had waived bowl eligibility requirements for the season, the Bulldogs received an invitation to the Armed Forces Bowl where they defeated Tulsa, becoming one of the few bowl teams with a losing record to record a bowl victory and set the record for the worst winning percentage for a team that won a bowl game.

== SEC Media Days ==
In the preseason media poll, Mississippi State was predicted to finish in a tie for fifth place in the West Division.

== Schedule ==
Mississippi State announced its 2020 football schedule on August 7, 2019. The 2020 schedule consisted of 7 home and 5 away games in the regular season.

The Bulldogs had games scheduled against Alabama A&M, New Mexico, NC State, and Tulane, but were canceled due to the COVID-19 pandemic.

Date	Time	Opponent	Rank	Site	TV	Result	Attendance
September 26	2:30 p.m.	at No. 6 LSU		Tiger Stadium; Baton Rouge, LA (rivalry)	CBS	W 44–34	21,124
October 3	6:30 p.m.	Arkansas	No. 16	Davis Wade Stadium; Starkville, MS	SECN Alt.	L 14–21	13,564
October 10	6:30 p.m.	at Kentucky		Kroger Field; Lexington, KY	SECN	L 2–24	12,000
October 17	3:00 p.m.	No. 11 Texas A&M		Davis Wade Stadium; Starkville, MS	ESPN	L 14–28	13,142
October 31	6:00 p.m.	at No. 2 Alabama		Bryant–Denny Stadium; Tuscaloosa, AL (rivalry)	ESPN	L 0–41	19,424
November 7	2:30 p.m.	Vanderbilt^{†}		Davis Wade Stadium; Starkville, MS	SECN	W 24–17	12,888
November 21	6:30 p.m.	at No. 13 Georgia		Sanford Stadium; Athens, GA	SECN	L 24–31	20,524
November 28	3:00 p.m.	at Ole Miss		Vaught–Hemingway Stadium; Oxford, MS (Egg Bowl)	SECN	L 24–31	16,218
December 12^{[a]}	6:30 p.m.	Auburn		Davis Wade Stadium; Starkville, MS	SECN	L 10–24	12,986
December 19	2:30 p.m.	Missouri		Davis Wade Stadium; Starkville, MS	SECN Alt.	W 51–32	11,748
December 31	11:00 a.m.	vs. No. 24 Tulsa*		Amon G. Carter Stadium; Fort Worth, TX (Armed Forces Bowl)	ESPN	W 28–26	9,000
*Non-conference game; ^{†}Homecoming; Rankings from AP Poll and CFP Rankings (after November 24) released prior to game; All times are in Central time

^{^[a]}The game between Auburn and Mississippi State was postponed due to an outbreak of COVID-19 on the Mississippi State team. The game was originally scheduled for November 14.
Schedule source:

== Rankings ==
Ranking movements Legend: ██ Increase in ranking ██ Decrease in ranking — = Not ranked RV = Received votes
	Week																
Poll	Pre	1	2	3	4	5	6	7	8	9	10	11	12	13	14	15	Final
AP	RV	RV	RV	RV	16	RV	RV	—									
Coaches	RV	RV	RV	RV	14	RV	RV	—									
CFP	Not released																Not released

== Game summaries ==
=== At No. 6 LSU ===
Team	1	2	3	4	Total
• Bulldogs	3	14	10	17	44
No. 6 Tigers	0	14	10	10	34

- Date: September 26
- Location: Baton Rouge, LA
- Game start: 2:30 p.m.
- Game attendance: 21,124
- Game weather: 85, Sunny, Wind NW @ 5 mph
- Referee: Jason Autrey
- TV announcers (CBS): Brad Nessler (play-by-play), Gary Danielson (color), Jamie Erdahl (sideline)

Statistics	MSST	LSU
First downs	24	25
Total yards	632	425
Rushing yards	9	80
Passing yards	623	345
Turnovers	4	2
Time of possession	30:28	29:32

Team	Category	Player	Statistics
Mississippi State	Passing	K. J. Costello	36/60, 623 yards, 5 TD, 2 INT
Mississippi State	Rushing	Kylin Hill	7 carries, 34 yards
Mississippi State	Receiving	Osirus Mitchell	7 receptions, 183 yards, 2 TD
LSU	Passing	Myles Brennan	27/46, 345 yards, 3 TD, 2 INT
LSU	Rushing	Chris Curry	9 carries, 47 yards
LSU	Receiving	Terrace Marshall Jr.	8 receptions, 122 yards, 2 TD

=== Arkansas ===
	1	2	3	4	Total
Razorbacks	7	7	7	0	21
No. 16 Bulldogs	7	0	7	0	14

Statistics	ARK	MSST
First downs	17	24
Total yards	275	400
Rushing yards	63	87
Passing yards	212	313
Turnovers	2	4
Time of possession	23:40	36:20

Team	Category	Player	Statistics
Arkansas	Passing	Feleipe Franks	20/28, 212 yards, 2 TD
Arkansas	Rushing	Trelon Smith	14 rushes, 48 yards
Arkansas	Receiving	De'Vion Warren	4 receptions, 100 yards, TD
Mississippi State	Passing	K. J. Costello	43/59, 313 yards, TD, 3 INT
Mississippi State	Rushing	Dillon Johnson	9 rushes, 39 yards, TD
Mississippi State	Receiving	Osirus Mitchell	5 receptions, 61 yards

=== At Kentucky ===
	1	2	3	4	Total
Bulldogs	0	0	2	0	2
Wildcats	0	14	0	10	24

Statistics	MSST	UK
First downs	18	10
Total yards	295	157
Rushing yards	20	84
Passing yards	275	73
Turnovers	6	1
Time of possession	34:49	25:11

Team	Category	Player	Statistics
Mississippi State	Passing	K. J. Costello	36/55, 232 yards, 4 INT
Mississippi State	Rushing	Kylin Hill	7 rushes, 17 yards
Mississippi State	Receiving	Kylin Hill	15 receptions, 79 yards
Kentucky	Passing	Terry Wilson	8/20, 73 yards, TD
Kentucky	Rushing	Terry Wilson	13 rushes, 50 yards
Kentucky	Receiving	Josh Ali	2 receptions, 22 yards

=== No. 11 Texas A&M ===
	1	2	3	4	Total
No. 11 Aggies	0	14	14	0	28
Bulldogs	0	0	7	7	14

Statistics	TAMU	MSST
First downs	17	15
Total yards	325	217
Rushing yards	186	-2
Passing yards	139	219
Turnovers	1	2
Time of possession	30:32	29:28

Team	Category	Player	Statistics
Texas A&M	Passing	Kellen Mond	13/23, 139 yards, 2 TD, INT
Texas A&M	Rushing	Isaiah Spiller	18 rushes, 114 yards, 2 TD
Texas A&M	Receiving	Chase Lane	2 receptions, 70 yards, TD
Mississippi State	Passing	Will Rogers	15/18, 120 yards, TD
Mississippi State	Rushing	Jo'Quavious Marks	7 rushes, 25 yards
Mississippi State	Receiving	Malik Heath	5 receptions, 57 yards, TD

=== At No. 2 Alabama ===
Team	1	2	3	4	Total
Bulldogs	0	0	0	0	0
• No. 2 Crimson Tide	17	10	0	14	41

- Date: October 31
- Location: Bryant–Denny Stadium, Tuscaloosa, AL
- Game start: 6:05 p.m.
- Game attendance: 19,424
- Game weather: 66, Partly cloudy skies, Wind ESE @ 6 mph
- Referee: Jason Autrey
- TV announcers (ESPN): Sean McDonough (play-by-play), Todd Blackledge (color), Todd McShay and Molly McGrath (sideline)

Statistics

Statistics	MSST	ALA
First downs	12	26
Total yards	200	499
Rushing yards	37	208
Passing yards	163	291
Turnovers	3	1
Time of possession	28:18	31:42

Team	Category	Player	Statistics
Mississippi State	Passing	Will Rogers	24/37, 147 yards, 2 INT
Mississippi State	Rushing	Jo'Quavious Marks	9 rushes, 32 yards
Mississippi State	Receiving	Jo'Quavious Marks	8 receptions, 38 yards
Alabama	Passing	Mac Jones	24/31, 291 yards, 4 TD
Alabama	Rushing	Najee Harris	21 rushes, 119 yards
Alabama	Receiving	DeVonta Smith	11 receptions, 203 yards, 4 TD

=== Vanderbilt ===
	1	2	3	4	Total
Commodores	0	0	7	10	17
Bulldogs	14	3	0	7	24

Statistics	VAN	MSST
First downs	30	14
Total yards	478	204
Rushing yards	142	-22
Passing yards	336	226
Turnovers	5	0
Time of possession	32:10	27:50

Team	Category	Player	Statistics
Vanderbilt	Passing	Ken Seals	31/46, 336 yards, TD, 3 INT
Vanderbilt	Rushing	Keyon Henry-Brooks	20 rushes, 115 yards, TD
Vanderbilt	Receiving	Cam Johnson	10 receptions, 114 yards
Mississippi State	Passing	Will Rogers	35/46, 226 yards, TD
Mississippi State	Rushing	Jo'Quavious Marks	6 rushes, 10 yards, TD
Mississippi State	Receiving	Malik Heath	9 receptions, 79 yards

=== At No. 13 Georgia ===
	1	2	3	4	Total
Bulldogs	3	14	7	0	24
No. 13 Bulldogs	0	17	7	7	31

Statistics

Statistics	MSST	UGA
First downs	20	18
Total yards	358	409
Rushing yards	22	8
Passing yards	336	401
Turnovers	0	0
Time of possession	32:07	27:53

Team	Category	Player	Statistics
Mississippi State	Passing	Will Rogers	41–52, 336 yards, TD
Mississippi State	Rushing	Dillon Johnson	8 rushes, 19 yards, 2 TD
Mississippi State	Receiving	Jaden Walley	7 receptions, 115 yards, TD
Georgia	Passing	J. T. Daniels	28–38, 401 yards, 4 TD
Georgia	Rushing	Zamir White	11 rushes, 21 yards
Georgia	Receiving	Jermaine Burton	8 receptions, 197 yards, 2 TD

=== At Ole Miss ===
	1	2	3	4	Total
Bulldogs	0	14	0	10	24
Rebels	14	7	0	10	31

Statistics

Statistics	MSST	MISS
First downs	23	24
Total yards	479	550
Rushing yards	39	163
Passing yards	440	387
Turnovers	1	0
Time of possession	32:27	27:33

Team	Category	Player	Statistics
Mississippi State	Passing	Will Rogers	45–61, 440 yards, 3 TD
Mississippi State	Rushing	Will Rogers	4 rushes, 26 yards
Mississippi State	Receiving	Jaden Walley	9 receptions, 176 yards
Ole Miss	Passing	Matt Corral	24–36, 385 yards, 2 TD
Ole Miss	Rushing	Jerrion Ealy	18 rushes, 93 yards, TD
Ole Miss	Receiving	Elijah Moore	12 receptions, 139 yards

=== Auburn ===
	1	2	3	4	Total
Tigers	3	3	3	15	24
Bulldogs	0	3	0	7	10

Statistics

Statistics	AUB	MSST
First downs	19	17
Total yards	343	240
Rushing yards	218	19
Passing yards	125	221
Turnovers	0	2
Time of possession	30:56	29:04

Team	Category	Player	Statistics
Auburn	Passing	Bo Nix	15–32, 125 yards, TD
Auburn	Rushing	Tank Bigsby	26 rushes, 192 yards
Auburn	Receiving	Seth Williams	3 receptions, 57 yards, TD
Mississippi State	Passing	Will Rogers	30–51, 221 yards, TD, 2 INT
Mississippi State	Rushing	Dillon Johnson	5 rushes, 30 yards
Mississippi State	Receiving	Jaden Walley	8 receptions, 100 yards

=== Missouri ===
	1	2	3	4	Total
Tigers	7	3	8	14	32
Bulldogs	14	13	7	17	51

Statistics

Statistics	MIZ	MSST
First downs	22	24
Total yards	342	446
Rushing yards	101	151
Passing yards	241	295
Turnovers	4	3
Time of possession	28:57	31:03

Team	Category	Player	Statistics
Missouri	Passing	Connor Bazelak	22–38, 225 yards, 2 TD, 3 INT
Missouri	Rushing	Larry Rountree III	25 rushes, 121 yards, 2 TD
Missouri	Receiving	Keke Chism	6 receptions, 64 yards, TD
Mississippi State	Passing	Will Rogers	21–36, 295 yards, 3 TD, INT
Mississippi State	Rushing	Jo'Quavious Marks	12 rushes, 70 yards, TD
Mississippi State	Receiving	Jaden Walley	5 receptions, 129 yards, TD

=== Vs. No. 24 Tulsa (Armed Forces Bowl) ===
	1	2	3	4	Total
No. 24 Golden Hurricane	0	6	7	13	26
Bulldogs	7	0	14	7	28

Statistics

Statistics	TLSA	MSST
First downs	27	16
Total yards	484	271
Rushing yards	137	123
Passing yards	347	148
Turnovers	2	0
Time of possession	31:19	28:41

Team	Category	Player	Statistics
Tulsa	Passing	Zach Smith	26–46, 347 yards, TD, 2 INT
Tulsa	Rushing	Corey Taylor II	20 rushes, 80 yards, TD
Tulsa	Receiving	Keylon Stokes	9 receptions, 117 yards, TD
Mississippi State	Passing	Will Rogers	19–30, 148 yards, TD
Mississippi State	Rushing	Jo'Quavious Marks	11 rushes, 72 yards, TD
Mississippi State	Receiving	Austin Williams	3 receptions, 42 yards

== Players drafted into the NFL ==
Round	Pick	Player	Position	NFL Club
7	253	Marquiss Spencer	DE	Denver Broncos
7	256	Kylin Hill	RB	Green Bay Packers
