= 2020 Vanderbilt Commodores football team =

American college football season

2020 Vanderbilt Commodores football
- Conference: Southeastern Conference
- Eastern Division
- Record: 0–9 (0–9 SEC)
- Head coach: Derek Mason (7th season; first 8 games); Todd Fitch (interim; final game)
- Offensive coordinator: Todd Fitch (1st season)
- Offensive scheme: Multiple
- Defensive coordinator: Ted Roof (1st season)
- Base defense: 4–3
- Home stadium: Vanderbilt Stadium

2020 Southeastern Conference football standings
	Conf.			Overall
Team	W		L	W		L
Eastern Division
No. 13 Florida x	8	–	2	8	–	4
No. 7 Georgia	7	–	2	8	–	2
Missouri	5	–	5	5	–	5
Kentucky	4	–	6	5	–	6
Tennessee*	3	–	7	3	–	7
South Carolina	2	–	8	2	–	8
Vanderbilt	0	–	9	0	–	9
Western Division
No. 1 Alabama x$#^	10	–	0	13	–	0
No. 4 Texas A&M	8	–	1	9	–	1
Auburn	6	–	4	6	–	5
LSU*	5	–	5	5	–	5
Ole Miss	4	–	5	5	–	5
Arkansas	3	–	7	3	–	7
Mississippi State	3	–	7	4	–	7
Championship: Alabama 52, Florida 46
# – College Football Playoff champion; ^ – College Football Playoff participant; $ – Conference champion; x – Division champion/co-champions; * – Tennessee vacated all wins due to NCAA violations. LSU was ineligible for postseason due to self imposed ban. Note: Due to COVID-19, the SEC played a conference-only schedule.; Rankings from AP Poll.

The 2020 Vanderbilt Commodores football team represented Vanderbilt University in the 2020 NCAA Division I FBS football season. The Commodores played their home games at Vanderbilt Stadium in Nashville, Tennessee, and competed in the Eastern Division of the Southeastern Conference (SEC). They were led by interim head coach Todd Fitch, who replaced Derek Mason after his firing on November 29, 2020. On December 14, 2020, Clark Lea was hired as head coach.

On November 28, in their game against Missouri, Vanderbilt's Sarah Fuller became the first woman to play in a Power Five conference game by delivering the opening kickoff for the second half. Fuller, the Commodores' goalkeeper on the school's SEC championship women's soccer team, was added to the football roster after the team's regular kicking specialists had to be quarantined due to COVID-19 protocols. The following game, against Tennessee in the season finale, Fuller would become the first woman to score in a Power Five game, going a perfect 2/2 on extra point attempts.

== Preseason ==
=== Award watch lists ===
Listed in the order that they were released

=== SEC Media Days ===
In the preseason media poll, Vanderbilt was predicted to finish in last place in the East Division.

== Schedule ==
Vanderbilt had games scheduled against Colorado State, Kansas State, Louisiana Tech and Mercer, which were all canceled due to the COVID-19 pandemic.

Date	Time	Opponent	Site	TV	Result	Attendance
September 26	6:30 p.m.	at No. 10 Texas A&M	Kyle Field; College Station, TX	SECN Alt.	L 12–17	24,073
October 3	6:30 p.m.	No. 20 LSU	Vanderbilt Stadium; Nashville, TN	SECN	L 7–41	2,000
October 10	11:00 a.m.	South Carolina	Vanderbilt Stadium; Nashville, TN	SECN	L 7–41	1,288
October 31	3:00 p.m.	Ole Miss	Vanderbilt Stadium; Nashville, TN (rivalry)	SECN	L 21–54	840
November 7	2:30 p.m.	at Mississippi State	Davis Wade Stadium; Starkville, MS	SECN	L 17–24	12,888
November 14	11:00 a.m.	at Kentucky	Kroger Field; Lexington, KY (rivalry)	SECN	L 35–38	12,000
November 21	11:00 a.m.	No. 6 Florida^{†}	Vanderbilt Stadium; Nashville, TN	ABC	L 17–38	1,147
November 28^{[a]}	11:00 a.m.	at Missouri	Faurot Field; Columbia, MO	SECN	L 0–41	11,053
December 12	3:00 p.m.	Tennessee	Vanderbilt Stadium; Nashville, TN (rivalry)	SECN	L 17–42	849
^{†}Homecoming; Rankings from AP Poll and CFP Rankings (after November 24) released prior to game; All times are in Central time

^{^[a]}The game between Vanderbilt and Missouri was originally scheduled to take place on October 17. However, due to COVID-19 management requirements in response to positive tests and subsequent quarantine of individuals within the Vanderbilt program, the game was rescheduled for December 12. The SEC postponed Tennessee vs. Vanderbilt to facilitate the rescheduling of the Vanderbilt–Missouri game. The shuffling allows for the opportunity for all 14 SEC teams to play 10 regular-season games.

== Personnel ==
2020 Vanderbilt Commodores football team roster
Players
Coaches
Offense

Pos.	#	Name	Class
WR	2	Amir Abdur-Rahman	Jr
RB	3	Ja'Veon Marlow	Jr
WR	4	James Bostic III	Sr
QB	5	Mike Wright	Fr
QB	6	Jeremy Moussa	Jr
WR	7	Camron Johnson	Jr
QB	8	Ken Seals	Fr
RB	9	Rocko Griffin	Fr
TE	10	Gavin Schoenwald	Jr
WR	11	Tyrell Alexander	GS
WR	13	Jackson Winrow	GS
WR	14	Devin Boddie Jr.	So
QB	15	Danny Clark	Jr
WR	16	Mac Hereford	GS
WR	17	Keithan Starling Jr.	Sr
WR	18	Logan Kyle	Fr
WR	19	Chris Pierce Jr.	Sr
RB	21	Keyon Henry-Brooks	So
RB	25	Mitchell Pryor	Jr
RB	32	Jamauri Wakefield	GS
TE	35	Kyle White	Jr
FB	51	Luke Blanton	Jr
OL	52	Kevo Wesley	Fr
OL	54	Tyler Steen	Jr
OL	57	Drew Birchmeier	GS
OL	61	Jonah Buchanan	Sr
OL	62	Julian Hernandez	So
OL	63	Grant Miller	Sr
OL	64	Stephen Spanellis	GS
OL	65	Michael Warden	Jr
OL	67	Trent Weaver	Fr
OL	68	Jason Brooks Jr.	Fr
OL	70	Bradley Ashmore	Fr
OL	71	Donald Fitzgerald	So
OL	72	Dan Dawkins	Jr
OL	73	Jonathan Stewart	Sr
OL	74	Cole Clemens	Sr
OL	75	Ben Cox	Fr
OL	76	Connor Mignone	GS
OL	78	Bryce Bailey	Sr
WR	81	Will Sheppard	Fr
TE	84	Justin Ball	So
TE	85	Joel DeCoursey	So
TE	86	Ben Bresnahan	Jr
WR	88	Jayden Harrison	So
TE	89	Diego LaMonica	Fr

Defense

Pos.	#	Name	Class
DB	1	Donovan Kaufman	Fr
CB	4	Randall Haynie	Sr
CB	6	Gabe Jeudy-Lally	So
DL	8	Alex Williams	So
DL	9	Daevion Davis	So
DL	10	Dayo Odeyingbo	Sr
S	11	Justin Harris	So
LB	12	Brayden DeVault-Smith	Sr
S	13	Brendon Harris	Jr
S	14	Maxwell Worship	Jr
CB	15	Elijah Hamilton	GS
CB	16	B. J. Anderson	Sr
LB	17	Feleti Afemui	Sr
LB	21	Kenny Herbert	Sr
S	22	Chase Lloyd	Fr
DB	23	Jaylen Mahoney	So
LB	24	Alston Orji	Jr
LB	26	Anfernee Orji	So
CB	27	Ryan McCord	Fr
CB	28	Allan George	Sr
S, LB	29	Jack Barton	Fr
S	30	De'Rickey Wright	Fr
LB	31	A. J. Walsh	Fr
S	33	Dashaun Jerkins	Jr
DL	41	Elijah McAllister	Jr
S	42	Camden Coleman	Jr
LB	43	Tré Brown	So
DL	44	Christian James	So
LB	45	Griffin Lampton	Fr
DL	46	Michael Spencer	Fr
LB	48	Andre Mintze	GS
LB	50	Ethan Barr	Fr
STAR	52	Alex Brown	Jr
LB	53	Tommy Eckels	Fr
DL	57	Drew Birchmeier	GS
DL	66	Cameron Robinson	Sr
DL	69	Brayden Bapst	So
DE, LB	88	Michael Owusu	Sr
DL	90	Cameron Tidd	GS
DL	92	Derek Green	So
DL	93	Tolu Thomas-Ailara	So
DL	94	Rutger Reitmaier	Jr
DL	95	Raashaan Wilkins Jr.	Jr
DE	96	Nate Clifton	So
DL	97	Lorenza Surgers	Jr
DL	99	Malik Langham	Jr

Special teams

Pos.	#	Name	Class
K	32	Sarah Fuller	Sr
P	36	Jared Wheatley	So
K, P	37	Pierson Cooke	Jr
K	38	Oren Milstein	GS
K	39	Javan Rice	Jr
K	47	Wes Farley	Jr
LS	49	Zach Drevno	Jr
LS	58	Wesley Schelling	Fr
LS	59	Scott Meyer	GS
P	95	Harrison Smith	Jr

Head coach

- Derek Mason
- Todd Fitch
  Interim head coach/Offensive coordinator

Coordinators/assistant coaches

- Ted Roof
  Defensive coordinator
- Devin Fitzsimmons
  Special teams coordinator/Tight ends
- Tony Ball
  Wide receivers
- Aaron Henry
  Cornerbacks
- Tim Horton
  Running backs
- Marc Mattioli
  Defensive backs
- Jovan Haye
  Defensive ends
- Kenechi Udeze
  Linebackers
- Bret Ingalls
  Senior offensive analyst
- Jeff Imamura
  Defensive analyst
- Caden Thomson
  Defensive analyst

Legend

- (C) Team captain
- (S) Suspended
- (I) Ineligible
- Injured
- Redshirt

Roster
Last update: November 30, 2023

== Game summaries ==
=== At No. 10 Texas A&M ===
	1	2	3	4	Total
Commodores	3	2	7	0	12
No. 10 Aggies	7	0	7	3	17

Statistics	VAN	TAMU
First downs	17	17
Total yards	255	372
Rushing yards	105	183
Passing yards	150	189
Turnovers	2	3
Time of possession	33:59	26:01

Team	Category	Player	Statistics
Vanderbilt	Passing	Ken Seals	20/29, 150 yards, TD, 2 INT
Vanderbilt	Rushing	Ja'Veon Marlow	16 rushes, 65 yards
Vanderbilt	Receiving	Amir Abdur-Rahman	5 receptions, 72 yards, TD
Texas A&M	Passing	Kellen Mond	17/28, 189 yards, TD
Texas A&M	Rushing	Isaiah Spiller	8 rushes, 117 yards
Texas A&M	Receiving	Caleb Chapman	4 receptions, 40 yards, TD

=== No. 20 LSU ===
	1	2	3	4	Total
No. 20 Tigers	7	14	13	7	41
Commodores	0	7	0	0	7

Statistics	LSU	VAN
First downs	28	17
Total yards	498	266
Rushing yards	161	153
Passing yards	337	113
Turnovers	1	2
Time of possession	29:13	30:47

Team	Category	Player	Statistics
LSU	Passing	Myles Brennan	23/37, 337 yards, 4 TD, INT
LSU	Rushing	John Emery Jr.	12 rushes, 103 yards, T
LSU	Receiving	Terrace Marshall Jr.	2 receptions, 67 yards, 2 TD
Vanderbilt	Passing	Ken Seals	11/25, 113 yards, TD, 2 INT
Vanderbilt	Rushing	Ja'Veon Marlow	17 rushes, 83 yards
Vanderbilt	Receiving	Camron Johnson	3 receptions, 63 yards

=== South Carolina ===
	1	2	3	4	Total
Gamecocks	3	7	17	14	41
Commodores	0	0	7	0	7

Statistics	SC	VAN
First downs	18	15
Total yards	485	249
Rushing yards	289	76
Passing yards	196	173
Turnovers	1	2
Time of possession	31:27	28:33

Team	Category	Player	Statistics
South Carolina	Passing	Collin Hill	16/24, 196 yards
South Carolina	Rushing	Kevin Harris	21 rushes, 171 yards, 2 TD
South Carolina	Receiving	Nick Muse	5 receptions, 85 yards
Vanderbilt	Passing	Ken Seals	17/24, 148 yards, TD
Vanderbilt	Rushing	Keyon Henry-Brooks	13 rushes, 72 yards
Vanderbilt	Receiving	Amir Abdur-Rahman	2 receptions, 46 yards

=== Ole Miss ===
	1	2	3	4	Total
Rebels	21	12	21	0	54
Commodores	0	14	0	7	21

Statistics	MISS	VAN
First downs	35	24
Total yards	641	421
Rushing yards	192	102
Passing yards	449	319
Turnovers	1	3
Time of possession	29:52	30:08

Team	Category	Player	Statistics
Ole Miss	Passing	Matt Corral	31/34, 412 yards, 6 TD
Ole Miss	Rushing	Jerrion Ealy	15 rushes, 95 yards
Ole Miss	Receiving	Elijah Moore	14 receptions, 238 yards, 3 TD
Vanderbilt	Passing	Ken Seals	31/40, 319 yards, 2 TD, INT
Vanderbilt	Rushing	Keyon Henry-Brooks	23 rushes, 66 yards, TD
Vanderbilt	Receiving	Camron Johnson	14 receptions, 97 yards

=== At Mississippi State ===
	1	2	3	4	Total
Commodores	0	0	7	10	17
Bulldogs	14	3	0	7	24

Statistics	VAN	MSST
First downs	30	14
Total yards	478	204
Rushing yards	142	-22
Passing yards	336	226
Turnovers	5	0
Time of possession	32:10	27:50

Team	Category	Player	Statistics
Vanderbilt	Passing	Ken Seals	31/46, 336 yards, TD, 3 INT
Vanderbilt	Rushing	Keyon Henry-Brooks	20 rushes, 115 yards, TD
Vanderbilt	Receiving	Camron Johnson	10 receptions, 114 yards
Mississippi State	Passing	Will Rogers	35/46, 226 yards, TD
Mississippi State	Rushing	Woody Marks	6 rushes, 10 yards, TD
Mississippi State	Receiving	Malik Heath	9 receptions, 79 yards

=== At Kentucky ===
	1	2	3	4	Total
Commodores	0	14	7	14	35
Wildcats	14	10	7	7	38

Statistics	VAN	UK
First downs	29	23
Total yards	407	458
Rushing yards	180	308
Passing yards	227	150
Turnovers	0	0
Time of possession	32:26	27:34

Team	Category	Player	Statistics
Vanderbilt	Passing	Ken Seals	21/32, 225 yards, 2 TD
Vanderbilt	Rushing	Keyon Henry-Brooks	29 rushes, 121 yards
Vanderbilt	Receiving	Amir Abdur-Rahman	7 receptions, 89 yards
Kentucky	Passing	Terry Wilson	13/15, 110 yards, 2 TD
Kentucky	Rushing	Chris Rodriguez Jr.	13 rushes, 149 yards, 2 TD
Kentucky	Receiving	Keaton Upshaw	2 receptions, 41 yards, TD

=== No. 6 Florida ===
	1	2	3	4	Total
No. 6 Gators	7	10	14	7	38
Commodores	10	0	7	0	17

Statistics	FLA	VAN
First downs	29	21
Total yards	586	406
Rushing yards	173	87
Passing yards	413	319
Turnovers	1	1
Time of possession	34:17	25:43

Team	Category	Player	Statistics
Florida	Passing	Kyle Trask	26/35, 383 yards, 3 TD
Florida	Rushing	Dameon Pierce	11 rushes, 55 yards, TD
Florida	Receiving	Kadarius Toney	6 receptions, 107 yards, TD
Vanderbilt	Passing	Ken Seals	22/34, 319 yards, 2 TD, INT
Vanderbilt	Rushing	Mitchell Pryor	13 rushes, 44 yards
Vanderbilt	Receiving	Chris Pierce Jr.	4 receptions, 97 yards, 2 TD

=== At Missouri ===
	1	2	3	4	Total
Commodores	0	0	0	0	0
Tigers	7	14	6	14	41

Statistics	VAN	MIZ
First downs	13	31
Total yards	185	603
Rushing yards	82	223
Passing yards	103	380
Turnovers	1	0
Time of possession	27:10	32:50

Team	Category	Player	Statistics
Vanderbilt	Passing	Ken Seals	11/18, 79 yards
Vanderbilt	Rushing	Keyon Henry-Brooks	15 rushes, 64 yards
Vanderbilt	Receiving	Camron Johnson	5 receptions, 33 yards
Missouri	Passing	Connor Bazelak	30/37, 318 yards
Missouri	Rushing	Larry Rountree III	21 rushes, 160 yards, 3 TD
Missouri	Receiving	Tyler Badie	7 receptions, 102 yards

=== Tennessee ===
	1	2	3	4	Total
Volunteers	7	21	7	7	42
Commodores	7	3	0	7	17

Statistics	TENN	VAN
First downs	24	16
Total yards	540	292
Rushing yards	212	53
Passing yards	328	239
Turnovers	2	1
Time of possession	33:37	26:23

Team	Category	Player	Statistics
Tennessee	Passing	Harrison Bailey	14/18, 207 yards, 2 TD
Tennessee	Rushing	Eric Gray	13 rushes, 74 yards
Tennessee	Receiving	Velus Jones Jr.	7 receptions, 125 yards, 2 TD
Vanderbilt	Passing	Ken Seals	22/39, 239 yards, 2 TD, INT
Vanderbilt	Rushing	Keyon Henry-Brooks	20 rushes, 56 yards
Vanderbilt	Receiving	Amir Abdur-Rahman	3 receptions, 69 yards

== Players drafted into the NFL ==
Round	Pick	Player	Position	NFL Club
2	54	Dayo Odeyingbo	DE	Indianapolis Colts
