= 2020 Tennessee Volunteers football team =

American college football season

2020 Tennessee Volunteers football
- Conference: Southeastern Conference
- Eastern Division
- Record: 0–7, 3 wins vacated (0–7 SEC, 3 wins vacated)
- Head coach: Jeremy Pruitt (3rd season)
- Offensive coordinator: Jim Chaney (6th season)
- Offensive scheme: Pro-style
- Defensive coordinator: Derrick Ansley (2nd season)
- Base defense: 3–4
- Home stadium: Neyland Stadium

2020 Southeastern Conference football standings
	Conf.			Overall
Team	W		L	W		L
Eastern Division
No. 13 Florida x	8	–	2	8	–	4
No. 7 Georgia	7	–	2	8	–	2
Missouri	5	–	5	5	–	5
Kentucky	4	–	6	5	–	6
Tennessee*	3	–	7	3	–	7
South Carolina	2	–	8	2	–	8
Vanderbilt	0	–	9	0	–	9
Western Division
No. 1 Alabama x$#^	10	–	0	13	–	0
No. 4 Texas A&M	8	–	1	9	–	1
Auburn	6	–	4	6	–	5
LSU*	5	–	5	5	–	5
Ole Miss	4	–	5	5	–	5
Arkansas	3	–	7	3	–	7
Mississippi State	3	–	7	4	–	7
Championship: Alabama 52, Florida 46
# – College Football Playoff champion; ^ – College Football Playoff participant; $ – Conference champion; x – Division champion/co-champions; * – Tennessee vacated all wins due to NCAA violations. LSU was ineligible for postseason due to self imposed ban. Note: Due to COVID-19, the SEC played a conference-only schedule.; Rankings from AP Poll.

The 2020 Tennessee Volunteers football team represented the University of Tennessee in the 2020 NCAA Division I FBS football season. The Volunteers played their home games at Neyland Stadium in Knoxville, Tennessee, and competed in the Eastern Division of the Southeastern Conference (SEC). The Volunteers were led by third-year head coach Jeremy Pruitt.

In a season initially questioned whether it would be played because of the COVID-19 pandemic, the Southeastern Conference ultimately decided to go through with the season, the Volunteers compiled a 3–7 record, all in conference games. While the team did not have a winning record, the NCAA had waived bowl eligibility requirement for the season, and the Volunteers accepted a bid to the Liberty Bowl. However, the team had to withdraw on December 21 after several players and coaches, including Pruitt, tested positive for COVID-19.

Pruitt was fired for cause in January 2021 following an NCAA investigation into recruiting violations. He left Knoxville with a 16–19 overall record. However, in July 2023, all Tennessee wins for the 2019 and 2020 seasons were vacated due to the recruiting violations. Thus, the 2020 Volunteers are credited with an official record of 0–7.

== Preseason ==
=== SEC Media Days ===
In the preseason media poll, Tennessee was predicted to finish in third place in the East Division.

== Schedule ==
Tennessee had games scheduled against Charlotte, Furman, Oklahoma, and Troy, which were all canceled due to the COVID-19 pandemic.

Date	Time	Opponent	Rank	Site	TV	Result	Attendance
September 26	7:30 p.m.	at South Carolina	No. 16	Williams–Brice Stadium; Columbia, SC (rivalry)	SECN	W 31–27 (vacated)	15,009
October 3	12:00 p.m.	Missouri	No. 21	Neyland Stadium; Knoxville, TN	SECN	W 35–12 (vacated)	21,159
October 10	3:30 p.m.	at No. 3 Georgia	No. 14	Sanford Stadium; Athens, GA (rivalry)	CBS	L 21–44	20,524
October 17	12:00 p.m.	Kentucky^{†}	No. 18	Neyland Stadium; Knoxville, TN (rivalry)	SECN	L 7–34	22,519
October 24	3:30 p.m.	No. 2 Alabama		Neyland Stadium; Knoxville, TN (Third Saturday in October)	CBS	L 17–48	23,394
November 7	7:30 p.m.	at Arkansas		Donald W. Reynolds Razorback Stadium; Fayetteville, AR	SECN	L 13–24	16,500
November 21	7:00 p.m.	at No. 23 Auburn		Jordan–Hare Stadium; Auburn, AL (rivalry)	ESPN	L 17–30	17,490
December 5	3:30 p.m.	No. 6 Florida		Neyland Stadium; Knoxville, TN (rivalry)	CBS	L 19–31	22,943
December 12	4:00 p.m.	at Vanderbilt		Vanderbilt Stadium; Nashville, TN (rivalry)	SECN	W 42–17 (vacated)	849
December 19	11:00	No. 5 Texas A&M		Neyland Stadium; Knoxville, TN	ESPN	L 13–34	22,232
^{†}Homecoming; Rankings from AP Poll and CFP Rankings (after November 24) released prior to game; All times are in Eastern time

The SEC postponed Tennessee vs. Vanderbilt to facilitate the rescheduling of the Vanderbilt-Missouri game. The shuffling allows for the opportunity for all 14 SEC teams to play 10 regular-season games.

Tennessee accepted an invitation to play in the Auto Zone Liberty Bowl in Memphis, TN held on December 31, 2020, but was forced to withdraw due to Coach Pruitt and several players testing positive for COVID-19.

== Game summaries ==
=== At South Carolina ===
Tennessee at South Carolina

Quarter	1	2	3	4	Total
#16 Tennessee	7	7	10	7	31
South Carolina	7	0	14	6	27

at Williams–Brice Stadium, Columbia, SC

- Date: September 26
- Game time: 7:30 p.m.
- Game weather: Cloudy, 79 °F (26 °C)
- Game attendance: 15,009
- Referee: Ken Williamson
- TV announcers (SECN): Taylor Zarzour (play-by-play), Matt Stinchcomb (color) and Alyssa Lang (sidelines)

=== Missouri ===
Missouri at Tennessee

Quarter	1	2	3	4	Total
Missouri	0	6	6	0	12
#21 Tennessee	7	14	7	7	35

at Neyland Stadium, Knoxville, TN

- Date: October 3
- Game time: 12:00 p.m.
- Game weather: Sunny, 55 °F (13 °C)
- Game attendance: 21,159
- Referee: Steve Marlow
- TV announcers (SECN): Dave Neal (play-by-play), D. J. Shockley (color), and Dawn Davenport (sidelines)

=== At #3 Georgia ===
Tennessee at Georgia

Quarter	1	2	3	4	Total
#14 Tennessee	7	14	0	0	21
#3 Georgia	7	10	14	14	45

at Sanford Stadium, Athens, GA

- Date: October 10
- Game time: 3:30 p.m.
- Game weather: Cloudy, 79 °F (26 °C)
- Game attendance: 20,524
- Referee: David Smith
- TV announcers (CBS): Brad Nessler (play-by-play), Gary Danielson (color), and Dawn Davenport (sidelines)

=== Kentucky ===
Kentucky at Tennessee

Quarter	1	2	3	4	Total
Kentucky	0	17	10	7	34
#21 Tennessee	0	7	0	0	7

at Neyland Stadium, Knoxville, TN

- Date: October 17
- Game time: 12:00 p.m.
- Game weather: Sunny, 85 °F (29 °C)
- Game attendance: 22,519
- Referee: Marc Curles
- TV announcers (SECN): Tom Hart (play-by-play), Jordan Rodgers (color), Cole Cubelic (sidelines)

=== #2 Alabama ===
Alabama at Tennessee

Quarter	1	2	3	4	Total
#2 Alabama	14	14	14	6	48
Tennessee	0	10	7	0	17

at Neyland Stadium, Knoxville, TN

- Date: October 24
- Game time: 3:30 p.m.
- Game weather: Cloudy, 72 °F (22 °C)
- Game attendance: 23,394
- Referee: Alex Moore
- TV announcers (CBS): Brad Nessler (play-by-play), Gary Danielson (color), Jamie Erdahl (sidelines)

=== At Arkansas ===
Tennessee at Arkansas

Quarter	1	2	3	4	Total
Tennessee	3	10	0	0	13
Arkansas	0	0	24	0	24

at Donald W. Reynolds Razorback Stadium, Fayetteville, AR

- Date: November 7
- Game time: 6:30 p.m.
- Game weather: Clear, 57 °F (14 °C)
- Game attendance: 16,500
- Referee: Mark Loeffler
- TV announcers (SECN): Tom Hart (play-by-play), Jordan Rodgers (color), Cole Cubelic (sidelines)

=== At #23 Auburn ===
Tennessee at Auburn

Quarter	1	2	3	4	Total
Tennessee	7	3	0	7	17
#23 Auburn	0	10	10	10	30

at Jordan–Hare Stadium, Auburn, AL

- Date: November 21
- Game time: 6:00 p.m.
- Game weather: Clear, 61 °F (16 °C)
- Game attendance: 17,490
- Referee: David Smith
- TV announcers (ESPN): Joe Tessitore (play-by-play), Greg McElroy (color), Allison Williams (sidelines)

=== #6 Florida ===
Florida at Tennessee

Quarter	1	2	3	4	Total
#6 Florida	3	14	7	7	31
Tennessee	0	7	0	12	19

at Neyland Stadium, Knoxville, TN

- Date: December 5
- Game time: 3:30 p.m.
- Game weather: Clear, 51 °F (11 °C)
- Game attendance: 22,943
- Referee: Steve Marlowe
- TV announcers (CBS): Carter Blackburn (play-by-play), Aaron Murray (color), Jenny Dell (sidelines)

=== At Vanderbilt ===
Tennessee at Vanderbilt

Quarter	1	2	3	4	Total
Tennessee	7	21	7	7	42
Vanderbilt	7	3	0	7	17

at Vanderbilt Stadium, Nashville, TN

- Date: December 12
- Game time: 3:00 p.m.
- Game weather: Partly cloudy, 66 °F (19 °C)
- Game attendance: 849
- Referee: Marc Curles
- TV announcers (SECN): Taylor Zarzour (play-by-play), Matt Stinchcomb (color) and Dawn Davenport (sidelines)

=== Texas A&M ===
Texas A&M at Tennessee

Quarter	1	2	3	4	Total
Aggies	7	17	0	10	34
Volunteers	7	6	0	0	13

at Neyland Stadium, Knoxville, TN

- Date: December 19
- Game time: 12:00 p.m.
- Game weather: Cloudy, 38 °F (3 °C)
- Game attendance: 22,645
- Referee: James Carter
- TV announcers (ESPN): Bob Wischusen (play-by-play), Dusty Dvoracek (color) and Quint Kessenich (sideline)

== Rankings ==
Ranking movements Legend: ██ Increase in ranking ██ Decrease in ranking RV = Received votes
	Week															
Poll	Pre	1	2	3	4	5	6	7	8	9	10	11	12	13	14	Final
AP	25	25*	15	16	21	14	18	RV								
Coaches	RV	RV*	17	21	20	12	17	RV								
CFP	Not released															Not released

== Players drafted into the NFL ==
Tennessee had two players selected in the 2021 NFL draft.

Round	Pick	Player	Position	NFL Club
3	77	Josh Palmer	WR	Los Angeles Chargers
6	226	Trey Smith	OG	Kansas City Chiefs
