= Jonathan Marshall (American football) =

American football player (born 1997)

Profile
- Position: Defensive tackle

Personal information
- Born: September 16, 1997 (age 29); Shepherd, Texas, U.S.
- Listed height: 6 ft 3 in (1.91 m)
- Listed weight: 310 lb (141 kg)

Career information
- High school: Shepherd (TX)
- College: Arkansas (2016–2020)
- NFL draft: 2021: 6th round, 207th overall pick

Career history
- New York Jets (2021–2022); Pittsburgh Steelers (2022–2023); Jacksonville Jaguars (2024)*
- * Offseason or practice squad member only

Awards and highlights
- Second-team All-SEC (2020)

Career NFL statistics as of 2023
- Total tackles: 2
- Stats at Pro Football Reference

Jonathan Marshall (born September 16, 1997) is an American professional football defensive tackle. He played college football for the Arkansas Razorbacks, and has previously played in the NFL for the New York Jets.

== Professional career ==
Pre-draft measurables
Height	Weight	Arm length	Hand span	40-yard dash	10-yard split	20-yard split	Vertical jump	Broad jump	Bench press
6 ft 3 1/8 in (1.91 m)	310 lb (141 kg)	32 1/4 in (0.82 m)	9 1/2 in (0.24 m)	4.88 s	1.67 s	2.70 s	32.0 in (0.81 m)	9 ft 6 in (2.90 m)	36 reps
All values from Pro Day

=== New York Jets ===
Marshall was drafted by the New York Jets of the National Football League (NFL) in the sixth round, 207th overall, of the 2021 NFL draft. On May 7, 2021, Marshall officially signed with the Jets.

On August 30, 2022, Marshall was waived by the Jets and signed to the practice squad the next day.

=== Pittsburgh Steelers ===
On December 14, 2022, the Pittsburgh Steelers signed Marshall off the Jets practice squad to their active roster. He was waived on August 29, 2023, and re-signed to the practice squad. On January 17, 2024, he signed a reserve/futures contract with the Steelers. Marshall was released on July 31.

=== Jacksonville Jaguars ===
On August 6, 2024, Marshall signed with the Jacksonville Jaguars. He was waived on August 25.

== Personal life ==
His cousin, Cedric Reed, is a former NFL player. He is also related to Cedrick Hardman, who played in the NFL for the San Francisco 49ers and Oakland Raiders from 1970 to 1981, winning Super Bowl XV with the Raiders in 1981.
