= Buddy Johnson (American football) =

American football player (born 1999)

No. 47 – Chicago Bears
- Position: Linebacker
- Roster status: Practice squad

Personal information
- Born: February 27, 1999 (age 27); Dallas, Texas, U.S.
- Listed height: 6 ft 1 in (1.85 m)
- Listed weight: 229 lb (104 kg)

Career information
- High school: Kimball (Dallas)
- College: Texas A&M (2017–2020)
- NFL draft: 2021: 4th round, 140th overall pick

Career history
- Pittsburgh Steelers (2021); San Francisco 49ers (2022)*; Houston Texans (2022)*; Chicago Bears (2023)*; Dallas Cowboys (2023–2025); Indianapolis Colts (2025); Las Vegas Raiders (2026)*; Chicago Bears (2026–present)
- * Offseason or practice squad member only

Career NFL statistics as of 2026
- Total tackles: 33
- Stats at Pro Football Reference

Devodrick "Buddy" Johnson (born February 27, 1999) is an American professional football linebacker for the Chicago Bears of the National Football League (NFL). He was selected by the Pittsburgh Steelers in the fourth round of the 2021 NFL draft. He played college football at Texas A&M University. He was selected by the Pittsburgh Steelers in the fourth round of the 2021 NFL draft.

== Early life ==
Johnson attended Justin F. Kimball High School. He was a two-way player at quarterback and outside linebacker. As a junior, he received second-team All-district honors at quarterback.

As a senior in 2016, he led the team with 472 rushing yards and 446 receiving yards. He also had 268 passing yards. He received All-district honors at linebacker.

== College career ==
Johnson accepted a football scholarship from Texas A&M University. As a true freshman, he appeared in 12 games, compiling 20 tackles, one sack and 3 quarterback pressures. He had 9 tackles (1.5 for loss) and one sack against Louisiana State University.

As a sophomore, he appeared in 12 games, tallying 27 tackles, 5.0 sacks and one fumble recovery. He had 7 tackles and assisted on a tackle for a loss against Mississippi State University.

As a junior, he started all 13 games, collecting 77 tackles (led the team) and 9.5 tackles for loss. He had 11 tackles against the University of Alabama. He made 11 tackles and recovered one fumble, returning it 62 yards for a touchdown against the University of Mississippi, while receiving SEC Defensive Player of the Week honors.

As a senior in 2020, the schedule was reduced to 10 games because of the COVID-19 pandemic. He started in all contests and was a part of the SEC top ranked defense (ninth nationally). He led the team with 86 tackles, 8.5 tackles for loss and 2 forced fumbles. He was second on the team with 4 sacks. He had 12 tackles, two pasess defensed and one forced fumble against the University of Georgia. He tied his career-high of 12 tackles, including two tackles-for-loss and one sack against the University of Arkansas.

He finished his college career after appearing in 47 games, with 210 tackles (24.5 tackles for loss), 6.5 sacks, five passes defensed, 3 forced fumbles, 2 fumble recoveries and one interception.

== Professional career ==
Pre-draft measurables
Height	Weight	Arm length	Hand span	Wingspan	40-yard dash	10-yard split	20-yard split	20-yard shuttle	Three-cone drill	Vertical jump	Broad jump
6 ft 0 1/2 in (1.84 m)	229 lb (104 kg)	31 1/2 in (0.80 m)	9 7/8 in (0.25 m)	6 ft 5 5/8 in (1.97 m)	4.58 s	1.62 s	2.63 s	4.07 s	7.09 s	38.5 in (0.98 m)	10 ft 8 in (3.25 m)
All values from Pro Day

=== Pittsburgh Steelers ===
Johnson was selected by the Pittsburgh Steelers in the fourth round (140th overall) of the 2021 NFL draft. On May 18, 2021, he signed a four-year rookie contract. He appeared in four games playing mostly on special teams and had two special teams tackles.

On August 30, 2022, Johnson was waived by the Steelers.

=== San Francisco 49ers ===
On September 5, 2022, Johnson signed with the practice squad of the San Francisco 49ers. He was released by San Francisco on October 18.

=== Houston Texans ===
On November 1, 2022, Johnson was signed to the Houston Texans' practice squad.

=== Chicago Bears ===
On July 25, 2023, Johnson signed as a free agent with the Chicago Bears. He was waived/injured on August 17, and reverted to the Bears' injured reserve list the next day, after failing to be claimed off the waiver wire. Johnson was released by the Bears on October 3.

=== Dallas Cowboys ===
On October 24, 2023, Johnson was signed to the Dallas Cowboys' practice squad. He was elevated for two games, where he had two special teams tackles and two tackles on defense. Johnson made his postseason debut on special teams in the Wild Card game against the Green Bay Packers.

Johnson signed a reserve/future contract with Dallas on January 15, 2024. He was declared inactive in the first three games, before appearing in each of the final 14 contests of the season. Johnson played mostly on special teams, making a career-high eight special teams tackles. He had a career-high three special teams tackles against the Atlanta Falcons.

On August 26, 2025, Johnson was released by the Cowboys as part of final roster cuts and was re-signed to the practice squad the next day.

=== Indianapolis Colts ===
On September 30, 2025, Johnson was signed by the Indianapolis Colts off of the Cowboys' practice squad.

=== Las Vegas Raiders ===
On July 27, 2026, Johnson signed with the Las Vegas Raiders. He was released by the Raiders as a part of final roster cuts on August 30.

=== Chicago Bears (second stint) ===
On September 1, 2026, Johnson was signed to the Chicago Bears' practice squad. On October 17, 2026, he was elevated to the active roster, and reverted to the practice squad six days later.
