= Richard LeCounte =

American football player (born 1998)

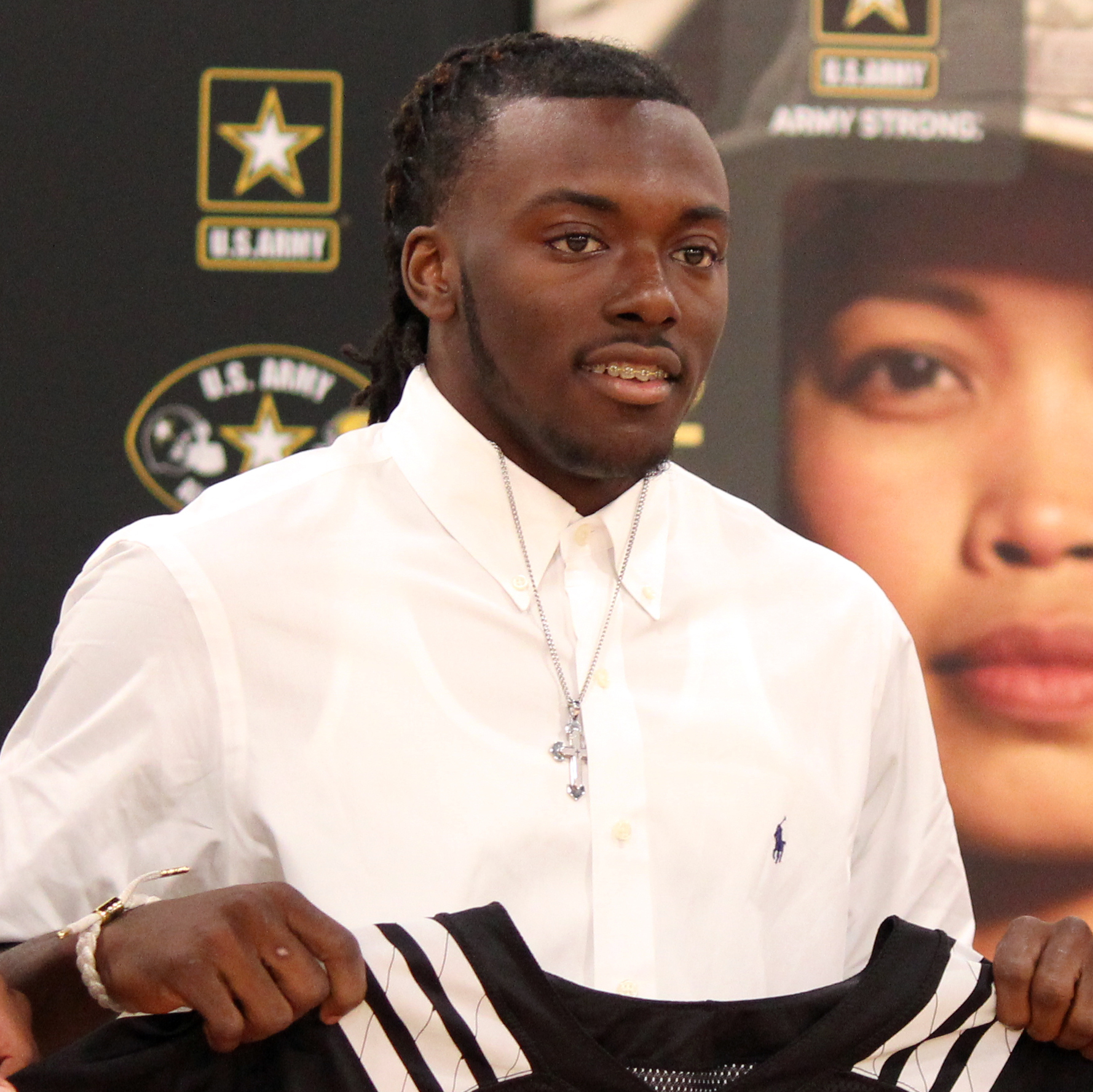
- LeCounte at Liberty County High School in 2016

Profile
- Position: Safety

Personal information
- Born: September 11, 1998 (age 28); Riceboro, Georgia, U.S.
- Listed height: 5 ft 11 in (1.80 m)
- Listed weight: 196 lb (89 kg)

Career information
- High school: Liberty County (Hinesville, Georgia)
- College: Georgia (2017–2020)
- NFL draft: 2021: 5th round, 169th overall pick

Career history
- Cleveland Browns (2021–2022); Los Angeles Rams (2022–2023)*; Tampa Bay Buccaneers (2023)*
- * Offseason or practice squad member only

Awards and highlights
- USA Today All-American (2016); First-team All-SEC (2020)

Career NFL statistics
- Total tackles: 3
- Stats at Pro Football Reference

Richard Lee LeCounte III (born September 11, 1998) is an American former professional football player who was a safety in the National Football League (NFL). He played college football for the Georgia Bulldogs.

== Early life ==
LeCounte attended Liberty County High School in Hinesville, Georgia. As a senior, he was named the 2016 Savannah Morning News Male Athlete of the Year and Football Defensive Player of the Year. LeCounte played in the 2017 U.S. Army All-American Bowl. A five star recruit, he committed to the University of Georgia to play college football. LeCounte was the very first recruit to commit to Kirby Smart after Smart took the job as the head coach of his alma mater.

== College career ==
As a true freshman at Georgia in 2017, LeCounte played in 10 games and had 15 tackles. As a sophomore in 2018, he started 13 of 14 games and led the team with 74 tackles and one interception. As a junior in 2019, LeCounte started all 14 and had 61 tackles and four interceptions. He returned to Georgia for his senior year in 2020, rather than enter the 2020 NFL draft.

== Professional career ==
Pre-draft measurables
Height	Weight	Arm length	Hand span	40-yard dash	10-yard split	20-yard split	20-yard shuttle	Three-cone drill	Vertical jump	Broad jump
5 ft 10 1/2 in (1.79 m)	196 lb (89 kg)	31 5/8 in (0.80 m)	9 in (0.23 m)	4.79 s	1.69 s	2.81 s	4.49 s	7.44 s	32.5 in (0.83 m)	10 ft 8 in (3.25 m)
All values from Pro Day

=== Cleveland Browns ===
On May 1, 2021, LeCounte was selected by the Cleveland Browns with the 169th overall pick in the 2021 NFL draft. He signed his four-year rookie contract on May 13, 2021.

On October 3, 2022, LeCounte was waived by the Browns and re-signed to the practice squad. He was released on October 19.

=== Los Angeles Rams ===
On December 14, 2022, LeCounte signed with the practice squad of the Los Angeles Rams. He signed a reserve/futures contract on January 9, 2023. He was waived on August 14, 2023.

=== Tampa Bay Buccaneers ===
On August 22, 2023, LeCounte signed with the Tampa Bay Buccaneers. He was waived by the Buccaneers on August 29, and was re-signed to the team's practice squad.

LeCounte signed a reserve/future contract with Tampa Bay on January 23, 2024. He was waived by the Buccaneers on April 24.
