= Landon Young =

American football player (born 1997)

Profile
- Position: Offensive tackle

Personal information
- Born: August 21, 1997 (age 29); Caneyville, Kentucky, U.S.
- Listed height: 6 ft 7 in (2.01 m)
- Listed weight: 321 lb (146 kg)

Career information
- High school: Lafayette (Lexington, Kentucky)
- College: Kentucky (2016–2020)
- NFL draft: 2021: 6th round, 206th overall pick

Career history
- New Orleans Saints (2021–2025); New York Jets (2026)*
- * Offseason or practice squad member only

Awards and highlights
- First-team All-SEC (2020)

Career NFL statistics as of 2025
- Games played: 56
- Games started: 12
- Stats at Pro Football Reference

Landon Young (born August 21, 1997) is an American professional football offensive tackle. He played college football for the Kentucky Wildcats and was selected by the New Orleans Saints in the sixth round of the 2021 NFL draft.

== College career ==
Young was ranked as a five–star recruit by 247Sports.com coming out of Lafayette High School in Lexington, Kentucky. He committed to Kentucky on June 14, 2013. Young would become a captain his senior year of high school for his football team.

== Professional career ==
Pre-draft measurables
Height	Weight	Arm length	Hand span	Wingspan	40-yard dash	10-yard split	20-yard split	20-yard shuttle	Three-cone drill	Vertical jump	Broad jump	Bench press
6 ft 6 1/8 in (1.98 m)	310 lb (141 kg)	33 3/4 in (0.86 m)	10 1/8 in (0.26 m)	6 ft 9 3/4 in (2.08 m)	5.00 s	1.72 s	2.94 s	4.89 s	7.70 s	30.5 in (0.77 m)	9 ft 0 in (2.74 m)	34 reps
All values from Pro Day

=== New Orleans Saints ===
Young was drafted by the New Orleans Saints with the 206th pick in the sixth round of the 2021 NFL draft on May 1, 2021. He signed his four-year rookie contract with New Orleans on June 8. Young was placed on injured reserve on November 23.

On March 18, 2025, Young was re-signed by the Saints to a one-year contract.

=== New York Jets ===
On May 10, 2026, Young signed a contract with the New York Jets after participating in the team's rookie minicamp. He was released by New York as a part of final roster cuts on August 30.
