= Ben Cleveland =

American football player (born 1998)

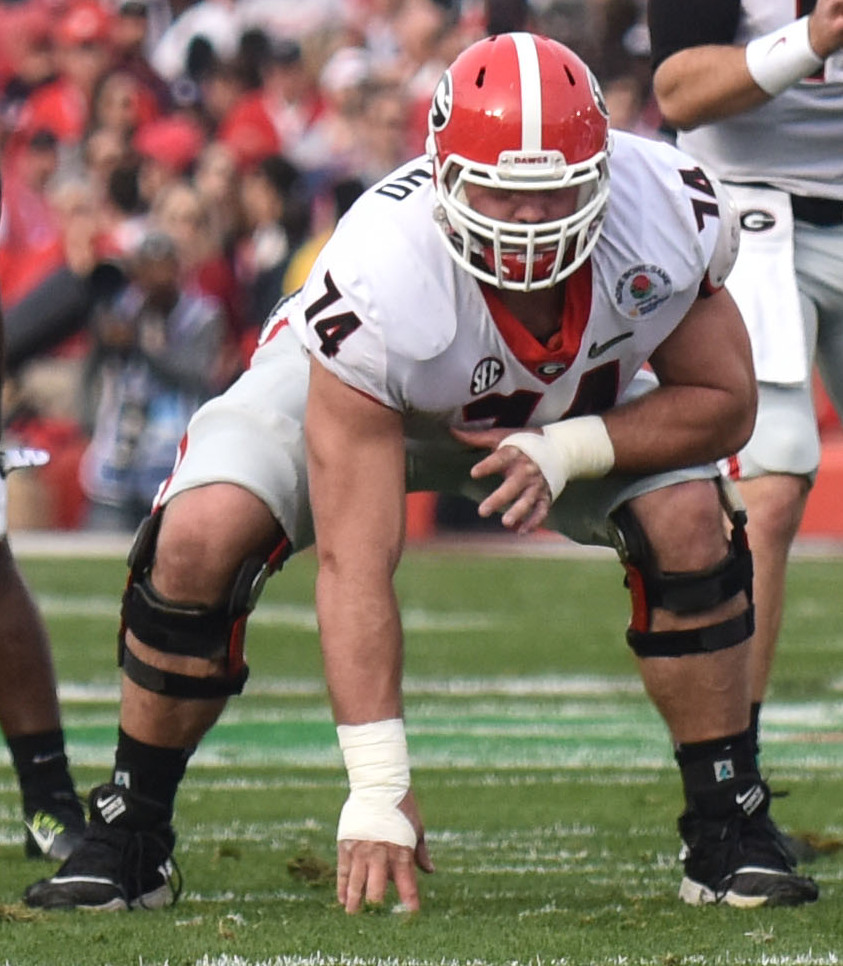
- Cleveland with Georgia at the 2018 Rose Bowl

Profile
- Position: Guard

Personal information
- Born: August 25, 1998 (age 28); Toccoa, Georgia, U.S.
- Listed height: 6 ft 6 in (1.98 m)
- Listed weight: 357 lb (162 kg)

Career information
- High school: Stephens County
- College: Georgia (2016–2020)
- NFL draft: 2021: 3rd round, 94th overall pick

Career history
- Baltimore Ravens (2021–2025); Los Angeles Chargers (2025)*
- * Offseason or practice squad member only

Awards and highlights
- Third-team All-American (2020); First-team All-SEC (2020)

Career NFL statistics as of 2025
- Games played: 64
- Games started: 7
- Stats at Pro Football Reference

Benjamin Keith Cleveland (born August 25, 1998) is an American professional football guard. He played college football for the Georgia Bulldogs and was drafted by the Baltimore Ravens in the third round of the 2021 NFL draft.

== Early life ==
Cleveland grew up in Toccoa, Georgia, and attended Stephens County High School, where he played baseball and football. He was rated a four star recruit and committed to play college football at Georgia during the summer before his junior season.

== College career ==
Cleveland redshirted his true freshman season. He played in all 15 of Georgia's games as a redshirt freshman and started the final five, including the 2018 College Football Playoff National Championship game. Cleveland started eight games with six games missed due to an injury in his redshirt sophomore season. He played in 13 games with seven starts at right guard as a redshirt junior. Cleveland returned to being a full-time starter at right guard in his final season at Georgia and was named first-team All-Southeastern Conference and a third-team All-American by the Associated Press after starting nine games in the COVID-19 shortened 2020 season.

== Professional career ==
Pre-draft measurables
Height	Weight	Arm length	Hand span	Wingspan	40-yard dash	10-yard split	20-yard split	20-yard shuttle	Vertical jump	Broad jump	Bench press
6 ft 6 1/4 in (1.99 m)	343 lb (156 kg)	33 3/4 in (0.86 m)	9 7/8 in (0.25 m)	6 ft 8 7/8 in (2.05 m)	5.01 s	1.77 s	2.91 s	4.88 s	28.0 in (0.71 m)	8 ft 6 in (2.59 m)	30 reps
All values from Pro Day

=== Baltimore Ravens ===
Cleveland was selected in the third round with the 94th overall pick of the 2021 NFL draft by the Baltimore Ravens. The Ravens obtained the 94th overall pick as part of the trade that sent Orlando Brown Jr. to the Kansas City Chiefs. On July 20, 2021, Cleveland signed his four-year rookie contract worth $4.8 million. He was placed on the active/non-football injury list at the start of training camp on July 21. On October 12, Cleveland suffered a knee injury in Week 5 against the Indianapolis Colts and was placed on injured reserve. On November 20, Cleveland was activated to the active roster from injured reserve.

In Week 6 of the 2024 season against the Washington Commanders, Cleveland blocked a field goal attempt by Austin Seibert. The Ravens went on to win the game 30–23.

On March 15, 2025, Cleveland re-signed with the Ravens. On December 8, Cleveland was suspended for three games for violating the NFL's substance abuse policy. On January 1, 2026, Cleveland was waived by the Ravens following his suspension.

=== Los Angeles Chargers ===
On January 5, 2026, Cleveland was signed to the Los Angeles Chargers' practice squad. He signed a reserve/future contract with Los Angeles on January 14. On July 27, Cleveland was released by the Chargers.

== Personal life ==
On February 12, 2025, Cleveland was arrested by the Baldwin County Sheriff’s Office for DUI and failure to maintain lane. According to authorities, Cleveland blew a .178 on a breathalyzer test.
