= Elijah Moore =

American football player (born 2000)

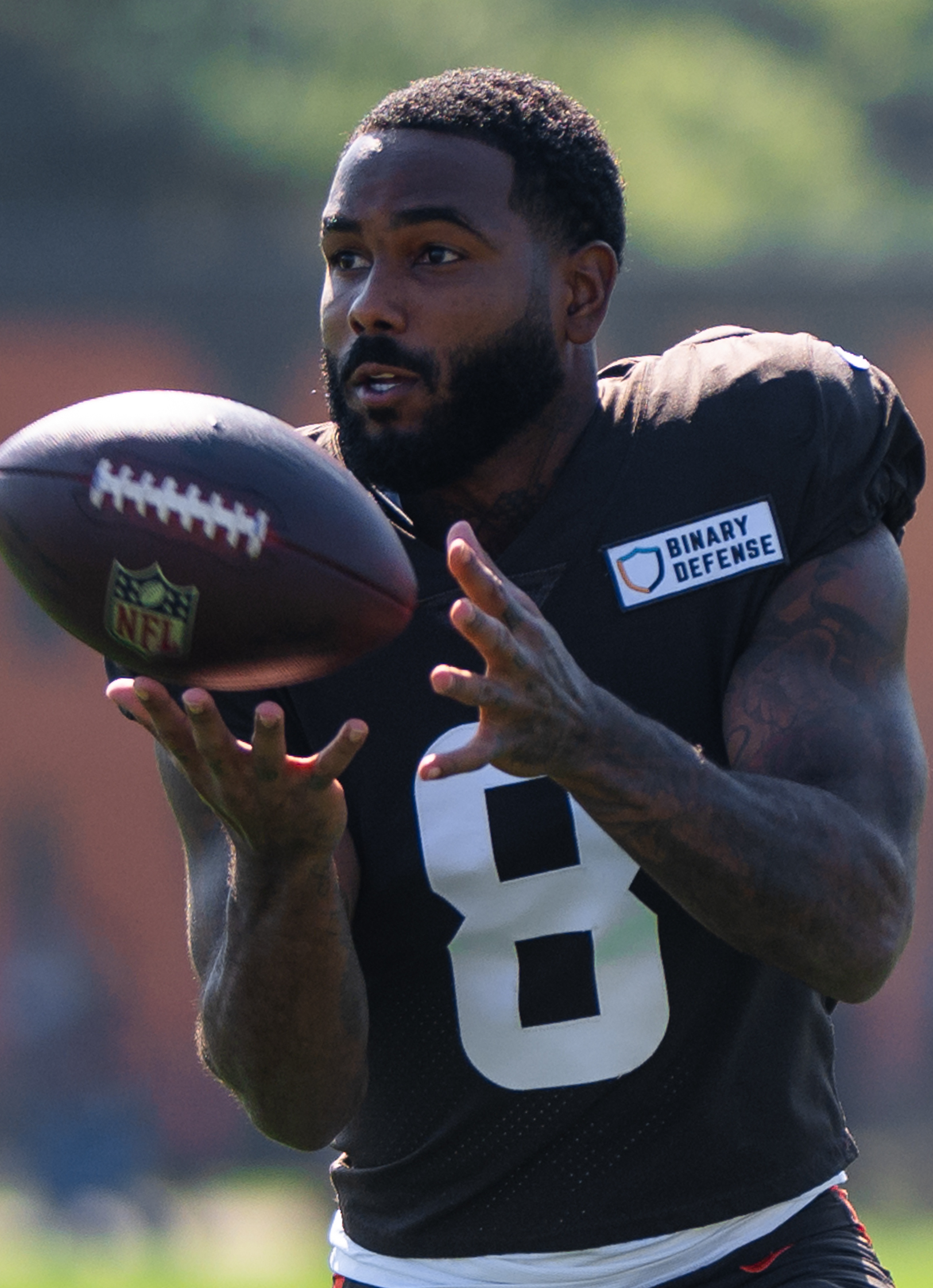
- Moore with the Cleveland Browns in 2023

No. 19 – Philadelphia Eagles
- Position: Wide receiver
- Roster status: Active

Personal information
- Born: March 27, 2000 (age 26); Sunrise, Florida, U.S.
- Listed height: 5 ft 10 in (1.78 m)
- Listed weight: 178 lb (81 kg)

Career information
- High school: St. Thomas Aquinas (Fort Lauderdale, Florida)
- College: Ole Miss (2018–2020)
- NFL draft: 2021: 2nd round, 34th overall pick

Career history
- New York Jets (2021–2022); Cleveland Browns (2023–2024); Buffalo Bills (2025); Denver Broncos (2025); Philadelphia Eagles (2026–present)

Awards and highlights
- Consensus All-American (2020); First-team All-SEC (2020); Conerly Trophy (2020)

Career NFL statistics as of Week 9, 2026
- Receptions: 213
- Receiving yards: 2,291
- Receiving touchdowns: 9
- Rushing yards: 95
- Rushing average: 3.7
- Rushing touchdowns: 2
- Stats at Pro Football Reference

Elijah Danilo Moore (born March 27, 2000) is an American professional football wide receiver for the Philadelphia Eagles of the National Football League (NFL). He played college football for the Ole Miss Rebels and was selected by the New York Jets in the second round of the 2021 NFL draft. He has also played for the Cleveland Browns, Buffalo Bills, and Denver Broncos.

== Early life ==
Moore grew up in Fort Lauderdale, Florida, and attended Western High School before transferring to St. Thomas Aquinas High School. As a senior, Moore caught 28 passes for 407 yards and five touchdowns and was named an Under Armour All-American. He was rated a four-star recruit and originally committed to play college football at Georgia over 33 other scholarship offers. Moore changed his commitment to Ole Miss in December of his senior year.

== College career ==
As a true freshman at the University of Mississippi, Moore caught 36 passes for 398 yards and two touchdowns. As a sophomore, he led the Rebels with 67 receptions, 850 receiving yards and six touchdown catches. In the 2019 Egg Bowl against Mississippi State, Moore drew a 15-yard unsportsmanlike conduct penalty for pretending to be a dog urinating in the end zone following a touchdown that drew Ole Miss to within one point. As a result, the extra point attempt went from being a 20-yard attempt to a 35-yard attempt, which was missed as Ole Miss lost 21–20. The loss led Ole Miss to fire head coach Matt Luke.

Moore entered his junior season on the watchlist for the Biletnikoff Award. In the season opener against Florida, Moore caught ten passes for 227 yards, the second most in a game in school history. He set a new school record for receiving yards in a game with 238 while also tying the Ole Miss game records for receptions with 14 and touchdown catches with three on October 31, 2020, in a 54–21 win over Vanderbilt. Moore finished the season with a school-record 86 receptions for 1,193 yards and eight touchdowns in eight games played before opting out before the Rebels' final regular season game in order to begin preparing for the 2021 NFL draft. Moore was named first-team All-SEC and was a consensus first-team All-America selection as well a finalist for the Biletnikoff Award.

== Professional career ==
Pre-draft measurables
Height	Weight	Arm length	Hand span	Wingspan	40-yard dash	10-yard split	20-yard split	20-yard shuttle	Three-cone drill	Vertical jump	Broad jump	Bench press
5 ft 9 1/2 in (1.77 m)	178 lb (81 kg)	30 1/8 in (0.77 m)	9 3/8 in (0.24 m)	5 ft 11 3/4 in (1.82 m)	4.35 s	1.57 s	2.57 s	4.00 s	6.67 s	36.0 in (0.91 m)	10 ft 1 in (3.07 m)	17 reps
All values from Pro Day

=== New York Jets ===
Moore was selected by the New York Jets in the second round (34th overall) of the 2021 NFL draft. On July 21, 2021, Moore signed his four-year rookie contract with the Jets, worth $8.94 million.

Moore entered his rookie season as a starting wide receiver. He scored his first career touchdown in a breakout game in Week 9 against the Indianapolis Colts, recording seven catches for 84 yards and two touchdowns. In Week 11, he had eight catches for 141 yards and a touchdown. He suffered a quad injury in Week 13 and was placed on injured reserve on December 11, 2021. He finished his rookie season with 43 receptions for 538 receiving yards and five receiving touchdowns and one rushing touchdown.

On October 20, 2022, Moore requested a trade from the Jets, citing frustration with his lack of involvement in the offense. In the 2022 season, Moore finished with 37 receptions for 446 receiving yards and one receiving touchdown in 16 games.

=== Cleveland Browns ===
On March 22, 2023, Moore and a third round pick were traded to the Cleveland Browns for a second-round pick.

Moore began the 2023 season as the Browns second option at wide receiver behind teammate Amari Cooper. Moore's best performance on the season came on week 17 against his former team the New York Jets where he caught 5 of 6 targets for 61 yards and a receiving touchdown. Moore's week 17 performance was helped by both him and teammate David Njoku receiving an increased target share due to Cooper being listed on the Browns inactive list with a heel injury. Moore finished his 2023 campaign with 59 receptions for 640 yards and two touchdowns. In Week 13 of the 2024 season, he had eight receptions for 111 yards against the Denver Broncos. He finished the 2024 season with 61 receptions for 538 yards and one touchdown.

On April 28, 2025, the Browns applied the unrestricted free agent tender to Moore following his visit with the Buffalo Bills.

=== Buffalo Bills ===
On April 30, 2025, the Buffalo Bills signed Moore to a one-year contract worth up to $5 million. He made nine appearances (two starts) for Buffalo, recording nine receptions for 112 yards; he also rushed six times for 24 yards and one touchdown. Moore was waived by Buffalo on November 26, following the signing of Brandin Cooks.

=== Denver Broncos ===
On December 2, 2025, Moore signed with the Denver Broncos' practice squad after visiting with them the previous day. He was elevated to the active roster for the AFC Championship Game, making one reception for four yards.

=== Philadelphia Eagles ===
On March 25, 2026, Moore signed with the Philadelphia Eagles on a one-year contract.

== Career statistics ==
=== NFL ===
==== Regular season ====
Year	Team	Games		Receiving					Rushing					Fumbles	
Year	Team	GP	GS	Rec	Yds	Avg	Lng	TD	Att	Yds	Avg	Lng	TD	Fum	Lost
2021	NYJ	11	6	43	538	12.5	62	5	5	54	10.8	19	1	0	0
2022	NYJ	16	9	37	446	12.1	42	1	5	5	1.0	10	0	1	0
2023	CLE	17	12	59	640	10.8	42	2	9	11	1.2	19	0	2	2
2024	CLE	17	13	61	538	8.8	44	1	1	1	1.0	1	0	0	0
2025	BUF	9	2	9	112	12.4	31	0	6	24	4.0	11	1	0	0
2026	PHI	7	2	4	17	4.3	14	0	0	0	0.0	0	0	0	0
Career		77	44	213	2,291	10.8	62	9	26	95	3.7	19	2	3	2

==== Postseason ====
Year	Team	Games		Receiving					Fumbles	
Year	Team	GP	GS	Rec	Yds	Avg	Lng	TD	Fum	Lost
2023	CLE	1	1	2	12	6.0	7	0	0	0
2025	DEN	1	0	1	4	4.0	4	0	0	0
Career		2	1	3	16	5.3	7	0	0	0

=== College ===
Year	Team	GP	Receiving			
Year	Team	GP	Rec	Yds	Avg	TD
2018	Ole Miss	11	36	398	11.1	2
2019	Ole Miss	12	67	850	12.7	6
2020	Ole Miss	8	86	1,193	13.9	8
Career		31	189	2,441	12.9	16
