= Marquiss Spencer =

American football player (born 1997)

Profile
- Position: Defensive end

Personal information
- Born: July 16, 1997 (age 29); Greenwood, Mississippi, U.S.
- Listed height: 6 ft 4 in (1.93 m)
- Listed weight: 300 lb (136 kg)

Career information
- High school: Greenwood
- College: Mississippi State (2016–2020)
- NFL draft: 2021: 7th round, 253rd overall pick

Career history
- Denver Broncos (2021); New York Jets (2022–2024)*; Pittsburgh Steelers (2024)*
- * Offseason or practice squad member only

Career NFL statistics
- Total tackles: 1
- Stats at Pro Football Reference

Marquiss A'kil James Spencer (born July 16, 1997) is an American professional football defensive end. He played college football for the Mississippi State Bulldogs and was selected by the Denver Broncos in the seventh round, 253rd overall, in the 2021 NFL draft.

== Professional career ==
Pre-draft measurables
Height	Weight	Arm length	Hand span	40-yard dash	10-yard split	20-yard split	20-yard shuttle	Three-cone drill	Vertical jump	Broad jump	Bench press
6 ft 3 5/8 in (1.92 m)	301 lb (137 kg)	33 1/8 in (0.84 m)	9 1/2 in (0.24 m)	4.85 s	1.76 s	2.78 s	4.51 s	7.28 s	31.5 in (0.80 m)	9 ft 3 in (2.82 m)	12 reps
All values from Pro Day

=== Denver Broncos ===
Spencer was drafted by the Denver Broncos in the seventh round, 253rd overall, of the 2021 NFL draft. He signed his four-year rookie contract on May 13, 2021. He was waived on August 31, 2021, and re-signed to the practice squad the next day. On January 2, 2022, Spencer made his NFL debut in the team's week 17 game against the Los Angeles Chargers, collecting a tackle in the 34–13 loss. He signed a reserve/future contract with the Broncos on January 11, 2022.

Spencer was waived on August 22, 2022.

=== New York Jets ===
On November 22, 2022, Spencer was signed to the New York Jets practice squad. He signed a reserve/future contract on January 9, 2023.

On August 29, 2023, Spencer was waived by the Jets and re-signed to the practice squad. He signed a reserve/future contract on January 8, 2024. He was waived on May 13.

=== Pittsburgh Steelers ===
On August 10, 2024, Spencer signed with the Pittsburgh Steelers following a season-ending injury to Breiden Fehoko. He was waived on August 26.
