= Kadarius Toney =

American football player (born 1999)

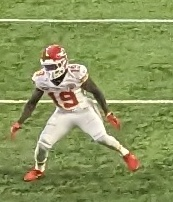
- Toney with the Kansas City Chiefs in 2023

No. 19, 87, 89
- Position: Wide receiver

Personal information
- Born: January 27, 1999 (age 27); Mobile, Alabama, U.S.
- Listed height: 6 ft 0 in (1.83 m)
- Listed weight: 193 lb (88 kg)

Career information
- High school: Blount (Eight Mile, Alabama)
- College: Florida (2017–2020)
- NFL draft: 2021: 1st round, 20th overall pick

Career history
- New York Giants (2021–2022); Kansas City Chiefs (2022–2023); Cleveland Browns (2024)

Awards and highlights
- 2× Super Bowl champion (LVII, LVIII); Second-team All-American (2020); First-team All-SEC (2020); NFL record: Longest Super Bowl punt return: 65 yards (LVII)

Career NFL statistics
- Receptions: 82
- Receiving yards: 760
- Touchdowns: 4
- Stats at Pro Football Reference

Kadarius Toney (born January 27, 1999) is an American former professional football player who was a wide receiver and running back in the National Football League (NFL). He played college football for the Florida Gators and was selected by the New York Giants in the first round of the 2021 NFL draft. He has also played in the NFL for the Kansas City Chiefs and Cleveland Browns.

After being traded by the Giants to the Kansas City Chiefs midway through his second season, Toney helped the Chiefs win Super Bowl LVII with his play on special teams, setting a record for the longest punt return in Super Bowl history in the 38–35 victory over the Philadelphia Eagles. However, due to off-field struggles the following year, he was released prior to the 2024 NFL season. Toney has since also played for the Cleveland Browns.

== Early life ==
Toney was born on January 27, 1999, in Mobile, Alabama. He attended Blount High School in Eight Mile, Alabama, where he was the starting quarterback for the last two years of his high school football career as a dual-threat quarterback.

As a junior, Toney threw for 3,604 yards while rushing for 896 and having 53 touchdowns (37 passing, 16 rushing). He was named Alabama 6A second-team all state selection, was selected to the AL.com Coastal Alabama first-team. As a senior, Toney threw for 2,984 yards while rushing for 894 yards and having 47 touchdowns (32 passing, 15 rushing). He was labeled as Alabama 6A Back of the Year, made the 2016 AL.com Super All-State Team, named Offensive MVP of the 2016 AL.com All-Coastal Alabama team, and played in the Alabama-Mississippi All Star Classic. He finished his high school career with a 20–5 record as a starter.

== College career ==
Toney was a consensus three-star recruit as a versatile athlete. He received scholarship offers from South Carolina, Georgia Tech, South Alabama, Alabama, and Florida. Toney eventually chose the Florida Gators.

During his freshman, sophomore and junior seasons, Toney was a reserve player for the Gators at wide receiver, running back, wildcat quarterback and special teams. As a senior in 2020, however, Toney's production increased dramatically. He led the Gators' potent offense with 70 receptions for 984 yards (14.1 average) while scoring 10 touchdowns. In 11 starts he also contributed as a runner (19 carries, 161 yards, 8.5 yards per carry, one touchdown) and returner (seven kick returns, 155 yards, 22.1 average, 11 punt returns, 139 yards, 12.6 average, one touchdown). The Associated Press voted him second-team All-America as an all-purpose player while the SEC league coaches voted him first-team all-conference. Toney was also a finalist for the 2020 Paul Hornung Award, given to the most versatile player in college football.

== Professional career ==
Pre-draft measurables
| Height | Weight | Arm length | Hand span | Wingspan | 40-yard dash | 10-yard split | 20-yard split | 20-yard shuttle | Three-cone drill | Vertical jump | Broad jump | Bench press |
|---|---|---|---|---|---|---|---|---|---|---|---|---|
| 5 ft 11 5/8 in (1.82 m) | 193 lb (88 kg) | 31 1/4 in (0.79 m) | 9 1/4 in (0.23 m) | 6 ft 2 1/2 in (1.89 m) | 4.37 s | 1.54 s | 2.51 s | 4.23 s | 6.88 s | 39.5 in (1.00 m) | 11 ft 4 in (3.45 m) | 9 reps |
All values from NFL Combine

=== New York Giants ===
Toney was selected by the New York Giants in the first round with the 20th overall pick in the 2021 NFL draft. He signed a four-year contract worth $13.7 million, on June 4, 2021. Toney was placed on the team's COVID-19 reserve list at the start of training camp. Toney started off slow, having only four receptions through the first three games. In Week 4 against the New Orleans Saints, Toney recorded six catches for 78 yards in the 27–21 overtime win. In Week 5 against the Dallas Cowboys, Toney had the best performance of his young career, recording 10 catches for 189 yards, breaking Odell Beckham Jr.'s Giants receiving record for a rookie, but was ejected for throwing a punch at Cowboys safety Damontae Kazee during the 44–20 loss. Toney missed four weeks of the season due to an oblique injury. On December 13, Toney was again placed on reserve/COVID-19 list. Despite appearing in only 10 games, Toney finished the season with the second-most receiving yards on the Giants with 420 on 39 receptions.

Toney injured his hamstring in Week 2 of the 2022 season. The injury caused him to miss five games for the Giants. Before being traded, he only recorded two receptions for zero yards (one reception was for 2 yards, the other was for −2) and no touchdowns.

=== Kansas City Chiefs ===
==== 2022 season ====
Kadarius Toney was traded to the Kansas City Chiefs on October 27, 2022, in exchange for a third (which was later traded to the Las Vegas Raiders in exchange for Darren Waller) and a sixth round pick in the 2023 NFL draft. In Week 10 against the Jacksonville Jaguars, Toney scored his first NFL touchdown. In the 2022 season, Toney appeared in nine regular season games and recorded 16 receptions for 171 yards and two touchdowns.

In Super Bowl LVII, Toney set a Super Bowl record by recording a 65-yard punt return in the fourth quarter, surpassing Jordan Norwood's record of a 61-yard punt return in Super Bowl 50. Toney caught a fourth quarter touchdown, the first of two successful Corn Dog plays, which helped put the Chiefs ahead for the first time all game. The Chiefs defeated the Philadelphia Eagles 38–35.

==== 2023 season ====
In July, Toney underwent knee surgery for a torn meniscus that he suffered during the first practice of training camp. However, he was able to return for the season opener against the Detroit Lions. Against the Lions, Toney had 1 reception for a single yard, as well as 1 carry for −1 yard in the 21–20 loss. He had four drops in the game including dropping two crucial passes: the first drop bounced to Lions safety Brian Branch and went for a pick-six, while the second drop would've allowed the Chiefs to make room for a game-winning field goal if caught. Toney acknowledged full blame for the mistakes after the game ended.

In Week 12, Toney missed his first game of the 2023 season with an injury designation of hip/ankle. In a Week 14 game against the Buffalo Bills, Toney was called for an offside penalty late in the fourth quarter, negating a play in which Travis Kelce made a cross-field lateral to Toney for what would have been the go-ahead touchdown with 1:12 remaining. The Chiefs went on to lose the game, 20–17. Chiefs quarterback Patrick Mahomes and head coach Andy Reid disagreed with the call after the game, while NFL referee Carl Cheffers told reporters that while players are sometimes warned before being penalized about incorrect alignment at the line of scrimmage, Toney's alignment was "beyond warning," and that "certainly, no warning is required, especially if they are lined up so far offsides where they're actually blocking our view of the ball."

In a Week 15 matchup against the New England Patriots, Toney once again made headlines for bobbling a pass which resulted in an interception during the 4th quarter. The blunder overshadowed the Chiefs 27–17 victory with most headlines focused in on Toney's poor season-long performance. When asked for his thoughts on Toney, head coach Andy Reid came out in defense of Toney stating he "wasn't down on him." Week 15 was the last game of the regular season Toney would play for the Chiefs, missing Weeks 16, 17, and 18 being designated with hip and ankle injuries. He continued to not play during the playoffs, missing the wild card, divisional and championship rounds where he was again listed with an injury designation, with the championship round additionally carrying the "personal reasons" designation.

On January 28, 2024, Toney courted controversy during an Instagram live broadcast in which he claimed he was not injured and that the Chiefs were falsely placing him on the injury report. He later apologised but did not retract the remarks. After being listed as inactive for the Super Bowl he finished the 2023 season having appeared in 13 games and starting two. Toney finished with 27 receptions on 38 targets for 169 yards and one touchdown. He earned a second Super Bowl title after the Chiefs defeated the San Francisco 49ers 25–22 in Super Bowl LVIII.

==== 2024 season ====
On May 2, 2024, the Chiefs declined the fifth-year option on Toney's contract, making him a free agent after the 2024 season.

On August 27, Toney was released by the Chiefs.

=== Cleveland Browns ===
On September 9, 2024, Toney signed with the Cleveland Browns' practice squad. On December 7, he was promoted to the active roster. Following his performance in Week 14 against the Pittsburgh Steelers where he muffed a punt and had a taunting penalty, Toney was released on December 10.

In 2025, Toney announced his retirement on an Instagram live. He stated on that live that he would retire from the sport entirely to pursue his rapping career.

== Legal issues ==
On August 1st, 2018, Toney was arrested in Florida because police found a loaded AR-15 in the back of his car during a traffic stop. According to him he was carrying it around for "protection from locals".

On February 6, 2025, Toney was arrested in Georgia on one count of aggravated assault and one count of obstructing 911 calls. Toney had allegedly strangled a woman in Georgia on January 14, 2025. A warrant was issued for his arrest on January 15, and his bail was set at $25,000 for each count. The day of his arrest, he was released after paying a $50,000 bail.

== Career statistics ==
Legend
| | Won the Super Bowl |
| **Bold** | Career high |

=== NFL ===
==== Regular season ====
| Year | Team | Games | | Receiving | | | | | Rushing | | | | | Fumbles | |
| Year | Team | GP | GS | Rec | Yds | Avg | Lng | TD | Att | Yds | Avg | Lng | TD | Fum | Lost |
|---|---|---|---|---|---|---|---|---|---|---|---|---|---|---|---|
| 2021 | NYG | 10 | 4 | **39** | **420** | 10.8 | **38** | 0 | 3 | 6 | 2.0 | 7 | 0 | 0 | – |
| 2022 | NYG | 2 | 1 | 2 | 0 | 0.0 | 2 | 0 | 2 | 23 | 11.5 | 19 | 0 | 0 | – |
| 2022 | KC | 7 | 3 | 14 | 171 | **12.2** | **38** | **2** | 5 | **59** | **11.8** | **32** | **1** | **1** | **1** |
| 2023 | KC | 13 | 2 | 27 | 169 | 6.3 | 18 | 1 | **11** | 31 | 2.8 | 14 | 0 | **1** | 0 |
| 2024 | CLE | 1 | 0 | 0 | – | – | – | – | 1 | -7 | -7.0 | -7 | 0 | 0 | – |
| Total | | 33 | 10 | 82 | 760 | 9.3 | 38 | 3 | 22 | 112 | 5.1 | 32 | 1 | 2 | 1 |

==== Postseason ====
| Year | Team | Games | | Receiving | | | | | Rushing | | | | | Fumbles | |
| Year | Team | GP | GS | Rec | Yds | Avg | Lng | TD | Att | Yds | Avg | Lng | TD | Fum | Lost |
|---|---|---|---|---|---|---|---|---|---|---|---|---|---|---|---|
| 2022 | KC | 3 | 1 | 7 | 50 | 7.1 | 9 | 1 | 1 | 14 | 14.0 | 14 | 0 | 0 | 0 |
| 2023 | KC | Did not play | | | | | | | | | | | | | |
| Total | | 3 | 1 | 7 | 50 | 7.1 | 9 | 1 | 1 | 14 | 14.0 | 14 | 0 | 0 | 0 |

=== College ===
| Year | Team | G | Receiving | | | | Rushing | | | |
| Year | Team | G | Rec | Yds | Avg | TD | Att | Yds | Avg | TD |
|---|---|---|---|---|---|---|---|---|---|---|
| 2017 | Florida | 8 | 15 | 152 | 10.1 | 0 | 14 | 120 | 8.6 | **1** |
| 2018 | Florida | 12 | 25 | 260 | 10.4 | 1 | **21** | **240** | **11.4** | 0 |
| 2019 | Florida | 7 | 10 | 194 | **19.4** | 1 | 12 | 59 | 4.9 | 0 |
| 2020 | Florida | 11 | **70** | **984** | 14.1 | **10** | 19 | 161 | 8.5 | **1** |
| Career | | **38** | **120** | **1,590** | **13.3** | **12** | **66** | **580** | **8.8** | **2** |
