= 2020 Florida Gators football team =

American college football season

2020 Florida Gators football

SEC Eastern Division champion

SEC Championship Game, L 46–52 vs. Alabama

Cotton Bowl Classic, L 20–55 vs. Oklahoma
- Conference: Southeastern Conference
- Eastern Division

Ranking
- Coaches: No. 12
- AP: No. 13
- Record: 8–4 (8–2 SEC)
- Head coach: Dan Mullen (3rd season)
- Offensive coordinator: Brian Johnson (1st season)
- Offensive scheme: Spread
- Defensive coordinator: Todd Grantham (3rd season)
- Base defense: 3–4
- Home stadium: Ben Hill Griffin Stadium

2020 Southeastern Conference football standings
	Conf.			Overall
Team	W		L	W		L
Eastern Division
No. 13 Florida x	8	–	2	8	–	4
No. 7 Georgia	7	–	2	8	–	2
Missouri	5	–	5	5	–	5
Kentucky	4	–	6	5	–	6
Tennessee*	3	–	7	3	–	7
South Carolina	2	–	8	2	–	8
Vanderbilt	0	–	9	0	–	9
Western Division
No. 1 Alabama x$#^	10	–	0	13	–	0
No. 4 Texas A&M	8	–	1	9	–	1
Auburn	6	–	4	6	–	5
LSU*	5	–	5	5	–	5
Ole Miss	4	–	5	5	–	5
Arkansas	3	–	7	3	–	7
Mississippi State	3	–	7	4	–	7
Championship: Alabama 52, Florida 46
# – College Football Playoff champion; ^ – College Football Playoff participant; $ – Conference champion; x – Division champion/co-champions; * – Tennessee vacated all wins due to NCAA violations. LSU was ineligible for postseason due to self imposed ban. Note: Due to COVID-19, the SEC played a conference-only schedule.; Rankings from AP Poll.

The 2020 Florida Gators football team represented the University of Florida in the 2020 NCAA Division I FBS football season. The Gators played their home games at Ben Hill Griffin Stadium in Gainesville, Florida, and competed in the Eastern Division of the Southeastern Conference (SEC). They were led by third-year head coach Dan Mullen and quarterback Kyle Trask.

Florida reached No. 3 in the AP Poll, their highest ranking since 2012, and won the SEC East for the first time since 2016. They lost to Alabama in the SEC Championship Game and to Oklahoma in the Cotton Bowl, finishing the season with a 8–4 record and ranked No. 13 in the AP Poll.

== Preseason ==
=== SEC Media Days ===
In the preseason media poll, Florida was predicted to win the East Division. Florida received the fourth-most votes to win the SEC Championship Game.

== Schedule ==
Due to the COVID-19 pandemic, the 2020 college football season was postponed, and there was some question if the season would be played at all. On July 31, the Southeastern Conference announced that its teams would play a ten-game conference-only season beginning in late September. Florida's previously scheduled games against non-conference opponents Eastern Washington, New Mexico State, and South Alabama were all canceled due to the scheduling change, as was the annual rivalry game against Florida State, breaking a streak of annual meetings that began in 1957. Conference games against Texas A&M and Arkansas were added to increase the usual eight-game SEC schedule to ten. On March 24, 2021, the game against Eastern Washington was rescheduled for 2022.

Attendance at all college football games was restricted during the 2020 season due to COVID-19 social distancing considerations. The University of Florida limited home attendance to 20% of capacity at Florida Field. All road games along with the SEC Championship Game and the Cotton Bowl Classic were played with similar attendance caps.

Date	Time	Opponent	Rank	Site	TV	Result	Attendance
September 26	12:00 p.m.	at Ole Miss	No. 5	Vaught–Hemingway Stadium; Oxford, MS	ESPN	W 51–35	13,926
October 3	12:00 p.m.	South Carolina	No. 3	Ben Hill Griffin Stadium; Gainesville, FL	ESPN	W 38–24	15,120
October 10	12:00 p.m.	at No. 21 Texas A&M	No. 4	Kyle Field; College Station, TX	ESPN	L 38–41	24,709
October 31^{[a]}	7:30 p.m.	Missouri^{†}	No. 10	Ben Hill Griffin Stadium; Gainesville, FL	SECN Alt.	W 41–17	12,049
November 7	3:30 p.m.	vs. No. 5 Georgia	No. 8	TIAA Bank Field; Jacksonville, FL (rivalry)	CBS	W 44–28	19,210
November 14	7:00 p.m.	Arkansas	No. 6	Ben Hill Griffin Stadium; Gainesville, FL	ESPN	W 63–35	16,116
November 21	12:00 p.m.	at Vanderbilt	No. 6	Vanderbilt Stadium; Nashville, TN	ABC	W 38–17	1,147
November 28	12:00 p.m.	Kentucky	No. 6	Ben Hill Griffin Stadium; Gainesville, FL (rivalry)	ESPN	W 34–10	14,453
December 5	3:30 p.m.	at Tennessee	No. 6	Neyland Stadium; Knoxville, TN (rivalry)	CBS	W 31–19	22,943
December 12^{[b]}	7:00 p.m.	LSU	No. 6	Ben Hill Griffin Stadium; Gainesville, FL (rivalry)	ESPN	L 34–37	16,610
December 19	8:00 p.m.	vs. No. 1 Alabama	No. 7	Mercedes-Benz Stadium; Atlanta, GA (SEC Championship Game / rivalry)	CBS	L 46–52	16,520
December 30	8:00 p.m.	vs. No. 6 Oklahoma*	No. 7	AT&T Stadium; Arlington, TX (Cotton Bowl Classic)	ESPN	L 20–55	17,323
*Non-conference game; ^{†}Homecoming; Rankings from AP Poll and CFP Rankings (after November 24) released prior to game; All times are in Eastern time

^{^[a]}Due to COVID-19 management requirements in response to positive tests and subsequent quarantine of individuals within the Florida program, the Missouri game was moved from October 24 to 31.
^{^[b]}Due to COVID-19 management requirements in response to positive tests and subsequent quarantine of individuals within the Florida program, the LSU game was moved from October 17 to December 12.

== Rankings ==
Ranking movements Legend: ██ Increase in ranking ██ Decrease in ranking т = Tied with team above or below
	Week																	
Poll	Pre	1	2	3	4	5	6	7	8	9	10	11	12	13	14	15	16	Final
AP	8	8*	5	5	3	4	10	10	10	8	6	6	6	6	6	11	10	13
Coaches	8	8*	6	6	3	3т	9	8	9	8	5	5	5	5	5	11	10	12
CFP	Not released												6	6	6	7	7	Not released

== Game summaries ==
=== Ole Miss ===
Florida Gators at Ole Miss Rebels – Game summary

Quarter	1	2	3	4	Total
No. 5 Florida	14	14	13	10	51
Ole Miss	7	7	7	14	35

at Vaught–Hemingway Stadium • Oxford, MS

- Date: September 26, 2020
- Game time: 12:00 p.m.
- Game weather: Temperature: 70 °F (21 °C) • Weather: Cloudy
- Game attendance: 13,926
- Referee: Marc Curles
- TV announcers (ESPN): Joe Tessitore, Greg McElroy and Marty Smith
- Boxscore

Game information

First Quarter

- Florida – Kyle Pitts 1 yard pass from Kyle Trask (Evan McPherson kick), 5:48
- Ole Miss – Dontario Drummond 46-yard pass from Matt Corral (Luke Logan kick), 3:43
- Florida – Trevon Grimes 22-yard pass from Kyle Trask (Evan McPherson kick), 0:50

Second quarter

- Ole Miss – Dontario Drummond 14-yard pass from Matt Corral (Luke Logan kick), 12:04
- Florida – Kadarius Toney 16-yard pass from Kyle Trask (Evan McPherson kick), 3:10
- Florida – Kyle Pitts 16-yard pass from Kyle Trask (Evan McPherson kick), 0:05

Third quarter

- Florida – Kyle Pitts 71-yard pass from Kyle Trask (Evan McPherson kick), 14:19
- Ole Miss – Jerrion Ealy 18-yard run (Luke Logan kick), 13:43
- Florida – Evan McPherson 55-yard field goal, 9:30
- Florida – Evan McPherson 37-yard field goal, 5:11

Fourth quarter

- Florida – Evan McPherson 23-yard field goal, 12:54
- Ole Miss – Kenny Yeboah 8-yard run (Matt Corral pass to Jonathan Mingo), 11:00
- Florida – Kyle Pitts 17-yard pass from Kyle Trask (Evan McPherson kick), 5:14
- Ole Miss – Snoop Conner 1 yard run, 0:58

Passing leaders

- FLA – Kyle Trask – 30/42, 416 yards, 6 touchdowns
- MISS – Matt Corral – 22/31, 395 yards, 3 touchdowns, 1 interception

Rushing leaders

- FLA – Kadarius Toney – 2 carries, 55 yards
- MISS – Jerrion Ealy – 16 carries, 79 yards, 1 touchdown

Receiving leaders

- FLA – Kyle Pitts – 8 receptions, 170 yards, 4 touchdowns
- MISS – Elijah Moore – 10 receptions, 227 yards

Tackling leaders

- FLA – Ventrell Miller – 15 tackles
- MISS – Keidron Smith – 12 tackles

Uniform Combination
Helmet	Jersey	Pants

=== South Carolina ===
South Carolina Gamecocks at Florida Gators – Game summary

Quarter	1	2	3	4	Total
South Carolina	7	7	3	7	24
No. 3 Florida	14	10	14	0	38

at Ben Hill Griffin Stadium • Gainesville, FL

- Date: October 3, 2020
- Game time: 12:00 p.m.
- Game weather: Temperature: 76 °F (24 °C) • Wind: N at 6 miles per hour (9.7 km/h) • Weather: Partly cloudy
- Game attendance: 15,120
- Referee: Lee Hedrick
- TV announcers (ESPN): Mark Jones, Dusty Dvoracek, and Marty Smith
- Boxscore

Game information

First quarter

- South Carolina – Kevin Harris 2-yard run (Parker White kick), 8:04
- Florida – Dameon Pierce 2-yard run (Evan McPherson kick), 3:45
- Florida – Kyle Pitts 13-yard pass from Kyle Trask (Evan McPherson kick), 0:06

Second quarter

- South Carolina – Shi Smith 4-yard pass from Collin Hill (Parker White kick), 9:31
- Florida – Evan McPherson 26-yard field goal, 3:31
- Florida – Kyle Pitts 4-yard pass from Kyle Trask (Evan McPherson kick), 1:22

Third quarter

- Florida – Trent Whittemore 4-yard pass from Kyle Trask (Evan McPherson kick), 7:47
- Florida – Kadarius Toney 56-yard pass from Kyle Trask (Evan McPherson kick), 4:44
- South Carolina – Parker White 45-yard field goal, 0:28

Fourth quarter

- South Carolina – Kevin Harris 9-yard pass from Collin Hill (Parker White kick), 10:21

Passing leaders

- SCAR – Collin Hill – 28/47, 212 yards, 2 touchdowns
- FLA – Kyle Trask – 21/29, 268 yards, 4 touchdowns, 1 interception

Rushing leaders

- SCAR – Kevin Harris – 22 carries, 100 yards, 1 touchdown
- FLA – Dameon Pierce – 9 carries, 51 yards, 1 touchdown

Receiving leaders

- SCAR – Shi Smith – 12 receptions, 85 yards, 1 touchdown
- FLA – Kadarius Toney – 6 receptions, 86 yards, 1 touchdown

Tackling leaders

- SCAR – Jammie Robinson and Keir Thomas – 6 tackles
- FLA – Zachary Carter, Shawn Davis, and Kaiir Elam – 8 tackles

Uniform Combination
Helmet	Jersey	Pants

=== Texas A&M ===
Florida Gators at Texas A&M Aggies – Game summary

Quarter	1	2	3	4	Total
No. 4 Florida	14	7	7	10	38
No. 21 Texas A&M	7	10	7	17	41

at Kyle Field • College Station, TX

- Date: October 10, 2020
- Game time: 12:00 p.m.
- Game weather: Temperature: 72 °F (22 °C) • Wind: Calm
- Game attendance: 24,709
- Referee: Steve Marlowe
- TV announcers (ESPN): Dave Pasch, Greg McElroy, Holly Rowe
- Boxscore

Game information

First quarter

- Florida – Kyle Pitts 5-yard pass from Kyle Trask (Evan McPherson kick), 7:32
- Texas A&M – Chase Lane 11-yard pass from Kellen Mond (Seth Small kick), 3:59
- Florida – Kadarius Toney 11-yard pass from Kyle Trask (Evan McPherson kick), 1:42

Second quarter

- Texas A&M – Caleb Chapman 2-yard pass from Kellen Mond (Seth Small kick), 9:33
- Florida – Nay'Quan Wright 1 yard run (Evan McPherson kick), 4:14
- Texas A&M – Seth Small 19-yard field goal, 0:00

Third quarter

- Florida – Kadarius Toney 37-yard pass from Kyle Trask (Evan McPherson kick), 9:38
- Texas A&M – Isaiah Spiller 3-yard run (Seth Small kick), 4:14

Fourth quarter

- Texas A&M – Isaiah Spiller 19-yard run (Seth Small kick), 12:35
- Florida – Evan McPherson 53-yard field goal, 9:54
- Florida – Dameon Pierce 1 yard pass from Kyle Trask (Evan McPherson kick), 6:14
- Texas A&M – Caleb Chapman 51-yard pass from Kellen Mond (Seth Small kick), 4:30
- Texas A&M – Seth Small 26-yard field goal, 0:00

Passing leaders

- FLA – Kyle Trask – 23/32, 314 yards, 4 touchdowns
- TAMU – Kellen Mond – 25/35, 338 yards, 3 touchdowns

Rushing leaders

- FLA – Nay'Quan Wright – 6 carries, 31 yards, 1 touchdown
- TAMU – Isaiah Spiller – 27 carries, 174 yards, 2 touchdowns

Receiving leaders

- FLA – Kadarius Toney – 7 receptions, 92 yards, 2 touchdowns
- TAMU – Caleb Chapman – 9 receptions, 151 yards, 2 touchdowns

Tackling leaders

- FLA – Shawn Davis – 12 tackles
- TAMU – Buddy Johnson – 11 tackles, 1 forced fumble

Uniform Combination
Helmet	Jersey	Pants

=== Missouri ===
Missouri Tigers at Florida Gators – Game summary

Quarter	1	2	3	4	Total
Missouri	0	7	0	10	17
No. 10 Florida	6	14	14	7	41

at Ben Hill Griffin Stadium • Gainesville, FL

- Date: October 31, 2020
- Game time: 7:30 p.m.
- Game weather: Temperature: 76 °F (24 °C) • Wind: NE at 5 miles per hour (8.0 km/h) • Weather: Clear
- Game attendance: 12,049
- Referee: David Smith
- TV announcers (SECN Alt.): Mike Morgan, Hutson Mason, Taylor Davis
- Boxscore

Game information

First quarter

- Florida – Chris Howard 28-yard field goal, 9:07
- Florida – Chris Howard 32-yard field goal, 2:10

Second quarter

- Missouri – Jarvis Ware 59-yard interception return (Harrison Mevis kick), 12:54
- Florida – Kadarius Toney 18-yard pass from Kyle Trask (Chris Howard kick), 1:41
- Florida – Kadarius Toney 30-yard pass from Kyle Trask (Chris Howard kick), 1:08

Third quarter

- Florida – Kadarius Toney 16-yard run (Chris Howard kick), 10:36
- Florida – Justin Shorter 2-yard pass from Kyle Trask (Chris Howard kick), 0:22

Fourth quarter

- Missouri – Harrison Mevis 29-yard field goal, 10:56
- Florida – Trevon Grimes 18-yard pass from Kyle Trask (Chris Howard kick), 7:50
- Missouri – Larry Rountree III 5-yard run (Harrison Mevis kick), 3:18

Passing leaders

- MIZZ – Connor Bazelak – 26/40, 208 yards
- FLA – Kyle Trask – 21/36, 345 yards, 4 touchdowns, 1 interception

Rushing leaders

- MIZZ – Larry Rountree III – 14 carries, 36 yards, 1 touchdown
- FLA – Kyle Trask – 6 carries, 47 yards

Receiving leaders

- MIZZ – Keke Chism – 5 receptions, 68 yards
- FLA – Kyle Pitts – 5 receptions, 81 yards

Tackling leaders

- MIZZ – Devin Nicholson – 13 tackles
- FLA – Jeremiah Moon and Brad Stewart – 6 tackles

Uniform Combination*
Helmet	Jersey	Pants

- For homecoming, the Gators wore throwback uniforms featuring blue helmets and jerseys based on those worn in the mid-1960s.

=== Georgia ===
Florida Gators vs. Georgia Bulldogs – Game summary

Quarter	1	2	3	4	Total
No. 8 Florida	14	24	3	3	44
No. 5 Georgia	14	7	7	0	28

at TIAA Bank Field • Jacksonville, FL

- Date: November 7, 2020
- Game time: 3:30 p.m.
- Game weather: Temperature: 79 °F (26 °C) • Wind: ENE at 15 miles per hour (24 km/h) • Weather: Partly cloudy
- Game attendance: 19,210
- Referee: James Carter
- TV announcers (CBS): Brad Nessler, Gary Danielson, Jamie Erdahl
- Boxscore

Game information

First quarter

- Georgia – Zamir White 75-yard run (Jack Podlesny kick), 14:48
- Georgia – Marcus Rosemy-Jacksaint 32-yard pass from Stetson Bennett (Jack Podlesny kick), 11:44
- Florida – Justin Shorter 14-yard pass from Kyle Trask (Evan McPherson kick), 8:20
- Florida – Dameon Pierce 2-yard run (Evan McPherson kick), 1:43

Second quarter

- Georgia – Eric Stokes 37-yard interception return (Jack Podlesny kick), 12:17
- Florida – Kyle Pitts 25-yard pass from Kyle Trask (Evan McPherson kick), 11:38
- Florida – Kemore Gamble 24-yard pass from Kyle Trask (Evan McPherson kick), 7:44
- Florida – Evan McPherson 50-yard field goal, 1:44
- Florida – Trevon Grimes 14-yard pass from Kyle Trask (Evan McPherson kick), 0:11

Third quarter

- Florida – Evan McPherson 51-yard field goal, 11:48
- Georgia – Kearis Jackson 25-yard pass from D'Wan Mathis (Jack Podlesny kick), 0:41

Fourth quarter

- Florida – Evan McPherson 34-yard field goal, 1:19

Passing leaders

- FLA – Kyle Trask – 30/43, 474 yards, 4 touchdowns, 1 interception
- UGA – Stetson Bennett – 5/16, 78 yards, 1 touchdown, 1 interception

Rushing leaders

- FLA – Dameon Pierce – 15 carries, 52 yards, 1 touchdown
- UGA – Zamir White – 7 carries, 107 yards, 1 touchdown

Receiving leaders

- FLA – Malik Davis – 5 receptions, 100 yards, 1 touchdown
- UGA – Kearis Jackson – 3 receptions, 48 yards, 1 touchdown

Tackling leaders

- FLA – Tedarrell Slaton – 5 tackles
- UGA – Nakobe Dean – 15 tackles

Uniform Combination
Helmet	Jersey	Pants

=== Arkansas ===
Arkansas Razorbacks at Florida Gators – Game summary

Quarter	1	2	3	4	Total
Arkansas	7	7	7	14	35
No. 6 Florida	7	28	7	21	63

at Ben Hill Griffin Stadium • Gainesville, FL

- Date: November 14, 2020
- Game time: 7:00 p.m.
- Game weather: Temperature: 68 °F (20 °C) • Wind: ESE at 4 miles per hour (6.4 km/h) • Weather: Pleasant
- Game attendance: 16,116
- Referee: Steve Marlowe
- TV announcers (ESPN): Bob Wischusen, Dan Orlovsky, Allison Williams
- Boxscore

Game information

First quarter

- Florida – Trevon Grimes 9-yard pass from Kyle Trask (Evan McPherson kick), 7:36
- Arkansas – Michael Woods II 47-yard pass from Feleipe Franks (AJ Reed kick), 6:03

Second quarter

- Florida – Trevon Grimes 23-yard pass from Kyle Trask (Evan McPherson kick), 10:03
- Florida – Justin Shorter 21-yard pass from Kyle Trask (Evan McPherson kick), 7:17
- Arkansas – Trelon Smith 83-yard run (AJ Reed kick), 6:55
- Florida – Jacob Copeland 33-yard pass from Kyle Trask (Evan McPherson kick), 4:33
- Florida – Keon Zipperer 5-yard pass from Kyle Trask (Evan McPherson kick), 0:17

Third quarter

- Arkansas – Rakeem Boyd 12-yard run (AJ Reed kick), 12:00
- Florida – Emory Jones 1 yard run (Evan McPherson kick), 3:01

Fourth quarter

- Florida – Keon Zipperer 11-yard pass from Kyle Trask (Evan McPherson kick), 13:08
- Florida – Zachary Carter 35-yard fumble recovery (Evan McPherson kick), 12:17
- Arkansas – Michael Woods II 82-yard pass from Feleipe Franks (AJ Reed kick), 11:51
- Florida – Xzavier Henderson 9-yard pass from Emory Jones (Evan McPherson kick), 5:41
- Arkansas – KJ Jefferson 12-yard run (AJ Reed kick), 0:40

Passing leaders

- ARK – Feleipe Franks – 15/19, 250 yards, 2 touchdowns
- FLA – Kyle Trask – 23/29, 356 yards, 6 touchdowns

Rushing leaders

- ARK – Trelon Smith – 8 carries, 118 yards, 1 touchdown
- FLA – Dameon Pierce – 12 carries, 69 yards

Receiving leaders

- ARK – Michael Woods II – 2 receptions, 129 yards, 2 touchdowns
- FLA – Trevon Grimes – 6 receptions, 109 yards, 2 touchdowns

Tackling leaders

- ARK – Grant Morgan – 15 tackles
- FLA – Mohamoud Diabate – 7 tackles

Uniform Combination*
Helmet	Jersey	Pants

=== Vanderbilt ===
Florida Gators at Vanderbilt Commodores – Game summary

Quarter	1	2	3	4	Total
No. 6 Florida	7	10	14	7	38
Vanderbilt	10	0	7	0	17

at Vanderbilt Stadium • Nashville, TN

- Date: November 21, 2020
- Game time: 12:00 p.m.
- Game weather: Temperature: 67 °F (19 °C) • Wind: SSE at 2 miles per hour (3.2 km/h) • Weather: Sunny
- Game attendance: 1,147
- Referee: Lee Hedrick
- TV announcers (ABC): Bob Wischusen, Dan Orlovsky, Paul Carcaterra
- Boxscore

Game information

First quarter

- Vanderbilt – Chris Pierce Jr. 16-yard pass from Ken Seals (Pierson Cooke kick), 10:50
- Florida – Kadarius Toney 27-yard pass from Kyle Trask (Evan McPherson kick), 7:47
- Vanderbilt – Pierson Cooke 25-yard field goal, 2:45

Second quarter

- Florida – Evan McPherson 33-yard field goal, 4:12
- Florida – Trevon Grimes 34-yard pass from Kyle Trask (Evan McPherson kick), 0:49

Third quarter

- Florida – Dameon Pierce 1 yard run (Evan McPherson kick), 9:47
- Florida – Kemore Gamble 1 yard pass from Kyle Trask (Evan McPherson kick), 2:55
- Vanderbilt – Chris Pierce Jr. 58-yard pass from Ken Seals (Pierson Cooke kick), 2:01

Fourth quarter

- Florida – Kemore Gamble 30-yard pass from Emory Jones (Evan McPherson kick), 6:46

Passing leaders

- FLA – Kyle Trask – 26/35, 383 yards, 3 touchdowns
- VAN – Ken Seals – 22/34, 319 yards, 2 touchdowns, 1 interception

Rushing leaders

- FLA – Dameon Pierce – 11 carries, 55 yards, 1 touchdown
- VAN – Mitchell Pryor – 13 carries, 44 yards

Receiving leaders

- FLA – Kadarius Toney – 6 receptions, 107 yards, 1 touchdown
- VAN – Chris Pierce Jr. – 4 receptions, 97 yards, 2 touchdowns

Tackling leaders

- FLA – Kyree Campbell – 9 tackles
- VAN – Anfernee Orji – 9 tackles

Uniform Combination
Helmet	Jersey	Pants

=== Kentucky ===
Kentucky Wildcats at Florida Gators – Game summary

Quarter	1	2	3	4	Total
Kentucky	0	10	0	0	10
No. 6 Florida	7	7	17	3	34

at Ben Hill Griffin Stadium • Gainesville, FL

- Date: November 28, 2020
- Game time: 12:00 p.m.
- Game weather: Temperature: 75 °F (24 °C) • Wind: NE at 8 miles per hour (13 km/h) • Weather: Partly cloudy
- Game attendance: 14,453
- Referee: David Smith
- TV announcers (ESPN): Mark Jones, Dusty Dvoracek, and Marty Smith
- Boxscore

Game information

First quarter

- Florida – Kyle Pitts 56-yard pass from Kyle Trask (Evan McPherson kick), 6:03

Second quarter

- Kentucky – Keaton Upshaw 4-yard pass from Terry Wilson (Matt Ruffolo kick), 11:18
- Kentucky – Matt Ruffolo 22-yard field goal, 2:13
- Florida – Kadarius Toney 50-yard punt return (Evan McPherson kick), 0:42

Third quarter

- Florida – Kyle Pitts 2-yard pass from Kyle Trask (Evan McPherson kick), 12:35
- Florida – Evan McPherson 34-yard field goal, 5:58
- Florida – Kyle Pitts 7-yard pass from Kyle Trask (Evan McPherson kick), 3:36

Fourth quarter

- Florida – Evan McPherson 40-yard field goal, 8:18

Passing leaders

- KEN – Terry Wilson – 10/18, 62 yards, 1 touchdown, 2 interceptions
- FLA – Kyle Trask – 21/27, 256 yards, 3 touchdowns

Rushing leaders

- KEN – A. J. Rose – 15 carries, 58 yards
- FLA – Dameon Pierce – 8 carries, 67 yards

Receiving leaders

- KEN – Josh Ali – 6 receptions, 32 yards
- FLA – Kyle Pitts – 5 receptions, 99 yards, 3 touchdowns

Tackling leaders

- KEN – Yusuf Corker – 8 tackles, 1 forced fumble
- FLA – James Houston – 8 tackles

Uniform Combination
Helmet	Jersey	Pants

=== Tennessee ===
Florida Gators at Tennessee Volunteers – Game summary

Quarter	1	2	3	4	Total
No. 6 Florida	3	14	7	7	31
Tennessee	0	7	0	12	19

at Neyland Stadium • Knoxville, TN

- Date: December 5, 2020
- Game time: 3:30 p.m.
- Game weather: Temperature: 51 °F (11 °C) • Wind: W at 7 miles per hour (11 km/h) • Weather: Sunny and clear
- Game attendance: 22,943
- Referee: Steve Marlowe
- TV announcers (CBS): Carter Blackburn, Aaron Murray, Jenny Dell
- Boxscore

Game information

First quarter

- Florida – Evan McPherson 30-yard field goal, 9:19

Second quarter

- Tennessee – Eric Gray 15-yard pass from Harrison Bailey (Brent Cimaglia kick), 9:59
- Florida – Trevon Grimes 4-yard pass from Kyle Trask (Evan McPherson kick), 7:53
- Florida – Kadarius Toney 2-yard pass from Kyle Trask (Evan McPherson kick), 0:33

Third quarter

- Florida – Trevon Grimes 8-yard from Kyle Trask (Evan McPherson kick), 13:31

Fourth quarter

- Florida – Jacob Copeland 12-yard pass from Kyle Trask (Evan McPherson kick), 11:21
- Tennessee – Ty Chandler 7-yard run, 5:33
- Tennessee – Velus Jones Jr. 22-yard pass from J.T. Shrout, 0:27

Passing leaders

- FLA – Kyle Trask – 35/49, 433 yards, 4 touchdowns
- TEN – J. T. Shrout – 12/14, 121 yards, 1 touchdown

Rushing leaders

- FLA – Jacob Copeland – 1 carry, 17 yards
- TEN – Ty Chandler – 12 carries, 49 yards, 1 touchdown

Receiving leaders

- FLA – Kyle Pitts – 7 receptions, 128 yards
- TEN – Velus Jones Jr. – 4 receptions, 70 yards, 1 touchdown

Tackling leaders

- FLA – Ventrell Miller – 12 tackles
- TEN – Warren Burrell and Henry To'oTo'o – 8 tackles

Uniform Combination
Helmet	Jersey	Pants

=== LSU ===
LSU Tigers at Florida Gators – Game summary

Quarter	1	2	3	4	Total
LSU	7	17	3	10	37
No. 6 Florida	7	10	14	3	34

at Ben Hill Griffin Stadium • Gainesville, FL

- Date: December 12, 2020
- Game time: 7:00 p.m.
- Game weather: Temperature: 64 °F (18 °C) • Wind: NW at 2 miles per hour (3.2 km/h) • Weather: cloudy, 97% humidity
- Game attendance: 16,610
- Referee: James Carter
- TV announcers (ESPN): Sean McDonough, Todd Blackledge, Todd McShay
- Boxscore

Game information

First quarter

- Florida – Kyle Trask 1 yard run (Evan McPherson kick), 8:01
- LSU – Jaray Jenkins 5-yard pass from Max Johnson (Cade York kick), 4:21

Second quarter

- LSU – Eli Ricks 68-yard interception return (Cade York kick), 12:59
- Florida – Evan McPherson 23-yard field goal, 6:25
- Florida – Jacob Copeland 19-yard pass from Kyle Trask (Evan McPherson kick), 2:25
- LSU – Kayshon Boutte 34-yard pass from Max Johnson (Cade York kick), 0:33
- LSU – Cade York 39-yard field goal, 0:00

Third quarter

- LSU – Cade York 30-yard field goal, 8:29
- Florida – Kyle Trask 1 yard run (Evan McPherson kick), 6:52
- Florida – Kadarius Toney 9-yard pass from Kyle Trask (Evan McPherson kick), 3:11

Fourth quarter

- LSU – Tre Bradford 4-yard pass from Max Johnson (Cade York kick), 13:14
- Florida – Evan McPherson 31-yard field goal, 2:51
- LSU – Cade York 57-yard field goal, 0:23

Passing leaders

- LSU – Max Johnson – 21/36, 239 yards, 3 touchdowns
- FLA – Kyle Trask – 29/47, 474 yards, 2 touchdowns, 2 interceptions

Rushing leaders

- LSU – Chris Curry – 17 carries, 64 yards
- FLA – Malik Davis – 7 carries, 81 yards

Receiving leaders

- LSU – Kayshon Boutte – 5 receptions, 108 yards, 1 touchdown
- FLA – Kadarius Toney – 9 receptions, 182 yards, 1 touchdown

Tackling leaders

- LSU – Damone Clark – 9 tackles
- FLA – Ventrell Miller – 16 tackles

Uniform Combination
Helmet	Jersey	Pants

=== Alabama ===
Alabama Crimson Tide vs. Florida Gators – Game summary

Quarter	1	2	3	4	Total
No. 1 Alabama	14	21	0	17	52
No. 7 Florida	10	7	14	15	46

at Mercedes-Benz Stadium • Atlanta, GA

- Date: December 19, 2020
- Game time: 8:00 p.m. EST
- Game weather: Game indoors
- Game attendance: 16,520
- Referee: Matt Loeffler
- TV announcers (CBS): Brad Nessler, Gary Danielson, Jamie Erdahl
- Boxscore

Game information

First quarter

- Alabama – Najee Harris 8-yard run (Will Reichard kick), 12:20
- Florida – Kadarius Toney 51-yard pass from Kyle Trask (Evan McPherson kick), 10:05
- Alabama – DeVonta Smith 31-yard pass from Mac Jones (Will Reichard kick), 6:07
- Florida – Evan McPherson 40-yard field goal, 1:57

Second quarter

- Alabama – Najee Harris 7-yard pass from Mac Jones (Will Reichard kick), 11:27
- Alabama – Najee Harris 23-yard pass from Mac Jones (Will Reichard kick), 2:28
- Florida – Kyle Trask 1 yard run (Evan McPherson kick), 1:09
- Alabama – Najee Harris 17-yard pass from Mac Jones (Will Reichard kick), 0:06

Third quarter

- Florida – Trevon Grimes 50-yard pass from Kyle Trask (Evan McPherson kick), 13:25
- Florida – Nay'Quan Wright 3-yard run (Evan McPherson kick), 0:18

Fourth quarter

- Alabama - Najee Harris 1-yard run (Will Reichard kick), 11:29
- Alabama – Will Reichard 20-yard field goal, 9:53
- Florida – Dameon Pierce 1 yard run (Evan McPherson kick), 6:33
- Alabama – DeVonta Smith 15-yard pass from Mac Jones (Will Reichard kick), 4:59
- Florida – Kyle Pitts 22-yard pass from Kyle Trask (Kyle Trask rush), 2:07

Passing leaders

- ALA – Mac Jones – 33/43, 418 yards, 5 touchdowns, 1 interception
- FLA – Kyle Trask – 26/40, 408 yards, 3 touchdowns

Rushing leaders

- ALA – Najee Harris – 31 carries, 178 yards, 2 touchdowns
- FLA – Emory Jones – 2 carries, 24 yards

Receiving leaders

- ALA – DeVonta Smith – 15 receptions, 184 yards, 2 touchdowns
- FLA – Kadarius Toney – 8 receptions, 153 yards, 1 touchdown

Tackling leaders

- ALA – Will Anderson Jr., Jordan Battle, Dylan Moses, Daniel Wright – 6 tackles
- FLA – Amari Burney and Mohamoud Diabate – 10 tackles

Uniform Combination
Helmet	Jersey	Pants

=== Oklahoma ===
Florida Gators vs. Oklahoma Sooners – Game summary

Quarter	1	2	3	4	Total
No. 7 Florida	3	10	0	7	20
No. 6 Oklahoma	17	14	10	14	55

at AT&T Stadium • Arlington, TX

- Date: December 30, 2020
- Game time: 8:00 p.m. EST
- Game weather: Game indoors
- Game attendance: 17,323
- Referee: Chris Coyte
- TV announcers (ESPN): Joe Tessitore, Dusty Dvoracek, Holly Rowe
- Boxscore

Game information

First quarter

- Oklahoma – Marvin Mims 27-yard pass from Spencer Rattler (Gabe Brkic kick), 12:59
- Oklahoma – Tre Norwood 45-yard interception return (Gabe Brkic kick), 12:22
- Oklahoma – Gabe Brkic 43-yard field goal
- Florida – Evan McPherson 21-yard field goal

Second quarter

- Florida – Emory Jones 1 yard run (Evan McPherson kick), 8:08
- Florida – Evan McPherson 35-yard field goal, 6:05
- Oklahoma – Theo Wease 36-yard pass from Spencer Rattler (Gabe Brkic kick), 4:08
- Oklahoma – Spencer Rattler 1 yard run (Gabe Brkic kick), 0:16

Third quarter

- Oklahoma – Gabe Brkic 20-yard field goal, 7:51
- Oklahoma – Rhamondre Stevenson 15-yard run (Gabe Brkic kick), 7:51

Fourth quarter

- Oklahoma – Charleston Rambo 20-yard pass from Spencer Rattler (Gabe Brkic kick), 10:30
- Oklahoma – Marcus Major 46-yard run (Gabe Brkic kick), 6:11
- Florida – Jordan Pouncey 27-yard pass from Anthony Richardson (Chris Howard kick), 3:18

Passing leaders

- FLA – Kyle Trask – 16/28, 158 yards, 3 interceptions
- OKLA – Spencer Rattler – 14/23, 247 yards, 3 touchdowns

Rushing leaders

- FLA – Emory Jones – 10 carries, 60 yards, 1 touchdown
- OKLA – Rhamondre Stevenson – 18 carries, 186 yards, 1 touchdown

Receiving leaders

- FLA – Trent Whittemore – 2 receptions, 47 yards
- OKLA – Seth McGowan – 3 receptions, 70 yards

Tackling leaders

- FLA – Amari Burney – 7 tackles
- OKLA – Pat Fields – 7 tackles

== Personnel ==
=== Roster ===
As of January 24, 2021

2020 Florida Gators roster
Quarterbacks: 2 Anthony Richardson – Freshman; 5 Emory Jones – (redshirt) Sophomore; 7 Luke Matthews – (redshirt) Freshman; 11 Kyle Trask – (redshirt) Senior; Running backs: 6 Nay'Quan Wright – (redshirt) Freshman; 20 Malik Davis – (redshirt) Junior; 21 Lorenzo Lingard – (redshirt) Sophomore; 24 Iverson Clement – (redshirt) Sophomore; 27 Dameon Pierce – Junior; 39 Michael Weir – (redshirt) Senior; Wide receivers: 0 Ja'Quavion Fraziars – Freshman; 1 Kadarius Toney – Senior; 3 Xzavier Henderson – Freshman; 8 Trevon Grimes – Junior; 12 Rick Wells – (redshirt) Senior; 15 Jacob Copeland – (redshirt) Sophomore; 80 Trent Whittemore – (redshirt) Freshman; 82 Ja'Markis Weston – (redshirt) Freshman; 86 Jordan Pouncey – (redshirt) Junior; 89 Justin Shorter – (redshirt) Sophomore; Tight ends: 9 Keon Zipperer – Sophomore; 45 Clifford Taylor IV – Senior; 84 Kyle Pitts – Junior; 87 Jonathan Odom – Freshman; 88 Kemore Gamble – (redshirt) Junior; Offensive line: 51 Stewart Reese – (redshirt) Senior; 54 Gerald Mincey – Freshman; 55 Hayden Knighton – Freshman; 56 Jean DeLance – (redshirt) Senior; 61 Brett Heggie – (redshirt) Senior; 62 Griffin McDowell – (redshirt) Sophomore; 64 Riley Simonds – (redshirt) Freshman; 65 Kingsley Eguakun – (redshirt) Freshman; 67 Richie Leonard – Freshman; 70 Michael Tarquin – (redshirt) Freshman; 72 Stone Forsythe – (redshirt) Senior; 73 Mark Pitts – Freshman; 74 Will Harrod – (redshirt) Freshman; 75 T.J. Moore – (redshirt) Junior; 76 Richard Gouraige – (redshirt) Sophomore; 77 Ethan White – Sophomore; 78 Josh Braun – Freshman	Defensive line: 9 Gervon Dexter – Freshman; 17 Zachary Carter – (redshirt) Junior; 33 Princely Umanmielen – Freshman; 54 Lamar Goods – Freshman; 55 Kyree Campbell – Senior; 56 Tedarrell Slaton – Senior; 66 Jaelin Humphries – Sophomore; 81 Dante Lang – (redshirt) Sophomore; 91 Marlon Dunlap Jr. – (redshirt) Senior; 92 Jalen Lee – Freshman; 95 Lucas Alonso – Freshman; Linebackers: 1 Brenton Cox Jr. – (redshirt) Sophomore; 4 David Reese – (redshirt) Sophomore; 7 Jeremiah Moon – (redshirt) Senior; 8 Khris Bogle – Sophomore; 10 Andrew Chatfield Jr. – (redshirt) Sophomore; 11 Mohamoud Diabate – Sophomore; 15 Derek Wingo – Freshman; 28 Ty'Ron Hopper – (redshirt) Freshman; 30 Amari Burney – Junior; 34 Lacedrick Brunson – (redshirt) Junior; 40 Jesiah Pierre – (redshirt) Freshman; 41 James Houston – (redshirt) Junior; 48 Noah Keeter – (redshirt) Freshman; 51 Ventrell Miller – (redshirt) Junior; 52 Antwaun Powell – Freshman; 99 Lloyd Summerall III – (redshirt) Freshman; Defensive backs: 0 Trey Dean – Junior; 2 Brad Stewart Jr. – Senior; 3 Marco Wilson – (redshirt) Junior; 5 Kaiir Elam – Sophomore; 6 Shawn Davis – Senior; 12 C.J. McWilliams – (redshirt) Senior; 13 Donovan Stiner – Senior; 14 Quincy Lenton – (redshirt) Senior; 16 Tre'Vez Johnson – Freshman; 21 Ethan Pouncey – Freshman; 22 Rashad Torrence II – Freshman; 23 Jaydon Hill – Sophomore; 24 Avery Helm – Freshman; 25 Chester Kimbrough – Sophomore; 26 Kamar Wilcoxson – Freshman; 27 Jahari Rogers – Freshman; 32 Mordecai McDaniel – Freshman; 38 Nick Oelrich – (redshirt) Senior; 39 Fenley Graham – Freshman; 43 Nicolas Sutton – (redshirt) Senior	Punters: 18 Jacob Finn – (redshirt) Senior; 26 Jeremy Crawshaw – Freshman; Placekickers: 19 Evan McPherson – Junior; 36 Zack Sessa – Freshman; 71 Chris Howard – (redshirt) Junior; Long snappers: 44 Brandon Becar – Graduate; 45 Marco Ortiz – (redshirt) Sophomore; 48 Brett DioGuardi – (redshirt) Senior; Athletes: 13 Kyle Engel – (redshirt) Freshman; 17 Kahleil Jackson – Freshman; 18 Jack Anders – (redshirt) Freshman; 19 Jack Ruskell – (redshirt) Junior; 25 Erik Askeland – (redshirt) Junior; 29 Khamal Ellison – (redshirt) Junior; 29 Isaac Ricks – (redshirt) Junior; 31 Chase DeMichele – (redshirt) Sophomore; 32 N'Jhari Jackson – (redshirt) Freshman; 33 Daniel Cross – (redshirt) Sophomore; 35 William Sawyer – (redshirt) Freshman; 36 Trey Thompson – (redshirt) Junior; 37 Patrick Moorer – (redshirt) Junior; 37 Tyler Waxman – (redshirt) Freshman; 42 Quaylin Crum – (redshirt) Junior; 42 Jaylin Jackson – (redshirt) Sophomore; 43 Nicolas Sutton – (redshirt) Junior; 46 John Brady – (redshirt) Freshman; 47 Justin Pelic – (redshirt) Freshman; 47 Austin Perry – (redshirt) Junior; 53 Chase Whitfield – (redshirt) Freshman; 57 Coleman Crozier – (redshirt) Sophomore; 83 Joshua Tse – (redshirt) Junior; 85 Kevin Johnson – (redshirt) Sophomore; 96 Travis Freeman – (redshirt) Freshman

- Redshirt
- Injury

=== Coaching staff ===
Name	Position	Joined staff
Dan Mullen	Head coach	2018
Todd Grantham	Defensive coordinator	2018
Brian Johnson	Offensive coordinator / quarterbacks	2018
Tim Brewster	Assistant head coach / Tight ends	2020
John Hevesy	Running game coordinator / offensive line	2018
Billy Gonzales	Passing game coordinator / Wide receivers	2018
Greg Knox	Running backs / Special teams coordinator	2018
Ron English	Safeties	2018
Torrian Gray	Cornerbacks	2019
David Turner	Defensive line	2019
Christian Robinson	Linebackers	2018
Nick Savage	Director of strength and conditioning	2018
Stephen Adegoke	Graduate assistant	2019

== Players drafted into the NFL ==
Round	Pick	Player	Position	NFL club
1	4	Kyle Pitts	TE	Atlanta Falcons
1	20	Kadarius Toney	WR	New York Giants
2	64	Kyle Trask	QB	Tampa Bay Buccaneers
4	136	Marco Wilson	CB	Arizona Cardinals
5	149	Evan McPherson	K	Cincinnati Bengals
5	165	Shawn Davis	S	Indianapolis Colts
5	173	Tedarrell Slaton	DT	Green Bay Packers
6	208	Stone Forsythe	OT	Seattle Seahawks
