= 2020 SEC Championship Game =

- Conference Championship
Alabama Crimson Tide	Florida Gators
(10–0)	(8–2)
52	46
Head coach: Nick Saban	Head coach: Dan Mullen
AP / Coaches / CFP; 1 / 1 / 1	AP / Coaches / CFP; 11 / 11 / 7
	1	2	3	4	Total
Alabama	14	21	0	17	52
Florida	10	7	14	15	46
- Date: December 19, 2020
- Season: 2020
- Stadium: Mercedes-Benz Stadium
- Location: Atlanta, Georgia
- MVP: Najee Harris (RB, Alabama)
- Favorite: Alabama by 16.5
- Referee: Matt Loeffler
- Halftime show: Dr. Pepper Tuition Giveaway featuring Dude Perfect
- Attendance: 16,520

United States TV coverage
- Network: CBS
- Announcers: Brad Nessler (play-by-play), Gary Danielson (color commentator), Jamie Erdahl (sideline reporter), Gene Steratore (rules analyst)

2020 Southeastern Conference football standings
	Conf.			Overall
Team	W		L	W		L
Eastern Division
No. 13 Florida x	8	–	2	8	–	4
No. 7 Georgia	7	–	2	8	–	2
Missouri	5	–	5	5	–	5
Kentucky	4	–	6	5	–	6
Tennessee*	3	–	7	3	–	7
South Carolina	2	–	8	2	–	8
Vanderbilt	0	–	9	0	–	9
Western Division
No. 1 Alabama x$#^	10	–	0	13	–	0
No. 4 Texas A&M	8	–	1	9	–	1
Auburn	6	–	4	6	–	5
LSU*	5	–	5	5	–	5
Ole Miss	4	–	5	5	–	5
Arkansas	3	–	7	3	–	7
Mississippi State	3	–	7	4	–	7
Championship: Alabama 52, Florida 46
# – College Football Playoff champion; ^ – College Football Playoff participant; $ – Conference champion; x – Division champion/co-champions; * – Tennessee vacated all wins due to NCAA violations. LSU was ineligible for postseason due to self imposed ban. Note: Due to COVID-19, the SEC played a conference-only schedule.; Rankings from AP Poll.

The 2020 SEC Championship Game presented by Dr. Pepper was a college football game played on Saturday, December 19, 2020, at Mercedes-Benz Stadium in Atlanta. The game determined the 2020 champion of the Southeastern Conference (SEC). The game, the 29th SEC Championship, featured the Florida Gators, champions of the East division, and the Alabama Crimson Tide, champions of the West division.

Alabama defeated Florida with a final score of 52–46, winning their seventh conference championship in twelve seasons.

== Teams ==
=== Florida ===
Florida entered the championship game with a record of 8–2, all in conference play. Their losses came against Texas A&M and LSU, each by three points. Florida compiled a record of 7–5 in prior SEC Championship Games, having last appeared in 2016 and having last won in 2008.

=== Alabama ===
Alabama entered the championship game with a record of 10–0, all in conference play. The scored at least 38 points in each of their regular season games, and won each contest by at least 15 points. Alabama compiled a record of 8–4 in prior SEC Championship Games; after last losing in 2008, they won each of their next six appearances (2009, 2012, 2014, 2015, 2016, and 2018).

== Game summary ==
2020 SEC Championship Game

Quarter	1	2	3	4	Total
No. 1 Alabama	14	21	0	17	52
No. 7 Florida	10	7	14	15	46

at Mercedes-Benz Stadium, Atlanta, Georgia

- Date: Saturday, December 19, 2020
- Game time: 8:00 p.m. EST
- Game weather: n/a (game played indoors)
- Referee: Matt Loeffler
- TV announcers (CBS): Brad Nessler (play-by-play), Gary Danielson (analyst), Jamie Erdahl (sideline)

Game information

First quarter

- (12:20) BAMA – Najee Harris 8 yard rush, Will Reichard kick (Drive: 9 plays, 70 yards, 2:40; Alabama 7–0)
- (10:05) FLA – Kadarius Toney 51 yard pass from Kyle Trask, Evan McPherson kick (Drive: 6 plays, 73 yards, 2:09; Tied 7–7)
- (6:07) BAMA – DeVonta Smith 31 yard pass from Mac Jones, Will Reichard kick (Drive: 1 play, 31 yards, 0:14; Alabama 14–7)
- (1:57) FLA – Evan McPherson 40 yard field goal (Drive: 10 plays, 56 yards, 4:04; Alabama 14–10)

Second quarter

- (11:27) BAMA – Najee Harris 7 yard pass from Mac Jones, Will Reichard kick (Drive: 12 plays, 73 yards, 5:23; Alabama 21–10)
- (2:28) BAMA – Najee Harris 23 yard pass from Mac Jones, Will Reichard kick (Drive: 13 plays, 70 yards, 5:59; Alabama 28–10)
- (1:09) FLA – Kyle Trask 1 yard rush, Evan McPherson kick (Drive: 4 plays, 75 yards, 1:19; Alabama 28–17)
- (0:06) BAMA – Najee Harris 17 yard pass from Mac Jones, Will Reichard kick (Drive: 8 plays, 78 yards, 0:58; Alabama 35–17)

Third quarter

- (13:25) FLA – Trevon Grimes 50 yard pass from Kyle Trask, Evan McPherson kick (Drive: 4 plays, 75 yards, 1:35; Alabama 35–24)
- (0:18) FLA – Nay'Quan Wright 3 yard rush, Evan McPherson kick (Drive: 12 plays, 80 yards, 4:58; Alabama 35–31)

Fourth quarter

- (11:29) BAMA – Najee Harris 1 yard rush, Will Reichard kick (Drive: 10 plays, 75 yards, 3:49; Alabama 42–31)
- (9:53) BAMA – Will Reichard 20 yard field goal (Drive: 4 plays, 8 yards, 1:28; Alabama 45–31)
- (6:33) FLA – Dameon Pierce 1 yard rush, Evan McPherson kick (Drive: 9 plays, 75 yards, 3:20; Alabama 45–38)
- (4:59) BAMA – DeVonta Smith 15 yard pass from Mac Jones, Will Reichard kick (Drive: 4 plays, 66 yards, 1:31; Alabama 52–38)
- (2:07) FLA – Kyle Pitts 22 yard pass from Kyle Trask, 2-point rush good (Drive: 10 plays, 75 yards, 2:52; Alabama 52–46)

=== Statistics ===
Statistics	BAMA	FLA
First downs	33	26
Plays–yards	83–605	66–462
Rushes–yards	40–187	26–54
Passing yards	418	408
Passing: comp–att–int	33–43–1	26–40–0
Time of possession	34:21	25:39

Team	Category	Player	Statistics
Alabama	Passing	Mac Jones	33/43, 418 yards, 5 TD, 1 INT
Alabama	Rushing	Najee Harris	31 carries, 178 yards, 2 TD
Alabama	Receiving	DeVonta Smith	15 receptions, 184 yards, 2 TD
Florida	Passing	Kyle Trask	26/40, 408 yards, 3 TD
Florida	Rushing	Emory Jones	2 carries, 24 yards
Florida	Receiving	Kadarius Toney	8 receptions, 153 yards, 1 TD
