= 2020 Missouri Tigers football team =

American college football season

2020 Missouri Tigers football

Music City Bowl, No Contest vs. Iowa
- Conference: Southeastern Conference
- Eastern Division
- Record: 5–5 (5–5 SEC)
- Head coach: Eliah Drinkwitz (1st season)
- Offensive scheme: Multiple
- Defensive coordinator: Ryan Walters (5th season)
- Base defense: 4–3
- Home stadium: Faurot Field

2020 Southeastern Conference football standings
	Conf.			Overall
Team	W		L	W		L
Eastern Division
No. 13 Florida x	8	–	2	8	–	4
No. 7 Georgia	7	–	2	8	–	2
Missouri	5	–	5	5	–	5
Kentucky	4	–	6	5	–	6
Tennessee*	3	–	7	3	–	7
South Carolina	2	–	8	2	–	8
Vanderbilt	0	–	9	0	–	9
Western Division
No. 1 Alabama x$#^	10	–	0	13	–	0
No. 4 Texas A&M	8	–	1	9	–	1
Auburn	6	–	4	6	–	5
LSU*	5	–	5	5	–	5
Ole Miss	4	–	5	5	–	5
Arkansas	3	–	7	3	–	7
Mississippi State	3	–	7	4	–	7
Championship: Alabama 52, Florida 46
# – College Football Playoff champion; ^ – College Football Playoff participant; $ – Conference champion; x – Division champion/co-champions; * – Tennessee vacated all wins due to NCAA violations. LSU was ineligible for postseason due to self imposed ban. Note: Due to COVID-19, the SEC played a conference-only schedule.; Rankings from AP Poll.

The 2020 Missouri Tigers football team represented the University of Missouri in the 2020 NCAA Division I FBS football season. The Tigers played their home games at Faurot Field in Columbia, Missouri, and competed in the Eastern Division of the Southeastern Conference (SEC). They were led by first-year head coach Eliah Drinkwitz.

In a season impacted by the COVID-19 pandemic, the Tigers compiled a 5–5 record, all in conference games. The team was set to face Iowa in the Music City Bowl, but had to withdraw due to COVID-19 issues. Missouri would face Iowa in the same bowl game four years later.

== Preseason ==
=== Award watch lists ===
Listed in the order that they were released

=== SEC Media Days ===
In the preseason media poll, Missouri was predicted to finish in sixth place in the East Division.

== Personnel ==
=== Staff ===
Name	Position	Seasons at Missouri	Alma mater
Eliah Drinkwitz	Head coach	1	Arkansas Tech (2004)
Charlie Harbison	Associate head coach / defensive backs	1	Gardner–Webb (1982)
Ryan Walters	Defensive coordinator / safeties	6	Colorado (2008)
Erik Link	Special teams coordinator	1	Drake (2003)
Brick Haley	Defensive line	4	Alabama A&M (1988)
Bush Hamdan	Wide receivers / quarterbacks	1	Boise State (2008)
Casey Woods	Tight ends / recruiting coordinator	1	Tennessee (2006)
David Gibbs	Secondary	2	Colorado (1990)
Marcus Johnson	Offensive line	1	Ole Miss (2004)
Curtis Luper	Running backs	1	Stephen F. Austin (1996)
D. J. Smith	Linebackers	1	Appalachian State (2010)
Andy Lutz	Director of football operations	1	Pacific (1991)
Zac Woodfin	Director of Athletic Performance	1	UAB (2004)

=== Roster ===
2020 Missouri Tigers football team roster
Players
Coaches
Offense

Pos.	#	Name	Class
RB	1	Tyler Badie	Jr
WR	2	Micah Wilson	Sr
QB	3	Shawn Robinson	Jr
RB	4	Elijah Young	Fr
WR	6	Keke Chism	GS
WR	7	Damon Hazelton	GS
QB	8	Connor Bazelak	Fr
WR	9	Jalen Knox	Jr
WR	11	Barrett Banister	Jr
QB	12	Brady Cook	Fr
WR	13	Javian Hester	Fr
WR	14	Dominic Gicinto	Jr
WR	15	Kris Abrams-Draine	Fr
QB	16	Jack Samsel	So
WR	18	Chance Luper	Fr
WR	19	Jay Maclin	Fr
RB	20	Simi Bakare	Jr
WR	26	Jaden Nash	Fr
RB	28	Dawson Downing	Sr
WR	31	D'Ionte Smith	Jr
RB	34	Larry Rountree III	Sr
RB	35	Michael Cox	Fr
RB	43	Jerney Jones	Sr
TE	45	Kibet Chepyator	Fr
TE	48	Niko Hea	So
OL	50	Hyrin White	Jr
OL	51	Zeke Powell	Jr
OL	54	Luke Griffin	Fr
OL	55	Michael Maietti	GS
OL	57	Steven Hardy	So
OL	59	Case Cook	Jr
OL	61	Richard Taylor	So
OL	64	Bobby Lawrence	So
OL	65	Trenton Sederwall	Fr
OL	69	Drake Heismeyer	Fr
OL	70	Dylan Spencer	Fr
OL	71	D.J. Bullard	Fr
OL	72	Xavier Delgado	So
OL	73	Mike Ruth	So
OL	75	Mitchell Walters	Fr
OL	76	Javon Foster	So
OL	79	Larry Borom	Jr
TE	80	Messiah Swinson	So
TE	81	Shawn Hendershot	Fr
TE	82	Daniel Parker Jr.	Jr
WR	86	Tauskie Dove	So
WR	87	Cade Musser	So
TE	88	Logan Christopherson	Jr
TE	89	Brendan Scales	Sr

Defense

Pos.	#	Name	Class
LB	0	Tre Williams	Sr
S	1	Joshuah Bledsoe	Sr
DB	2	Ennis Rakestraw Jr.	Fr
S	3	Martez Manuel	So
S	4	Jalani Williams	Fr
DL	6	Darius Robinson	So
DB	7	Stacy Brown	So
DB	8	Jarvis Ware	Jr
S	9	Tyree Gillespie	Sr
DB	10	Chris Mills	So
LB	11	Devin Nicholson	So
DB	14	Adam Sparks	Sr
LB	15	Johnny Walker Jr.	Fr
LB	16	Gerald Nathan Jr.	So
DB	17	Jaylon Carlies	Fr
DL	18	Trajan Jeffcoat	So
DB	21	Tyler Jones	Fr
DB	24	Ishmael Burdine	Fr
LB	25	Jamal Brooks	Sr
DB	26	Aidan Harrison	So
LB	28	Jatorian Hansford	Jr
LB	29	Jamie Pettway	Fr
DB	30	Zion Sales	Jr
LB	32	Nick Bolton	Jr
LB	33	Chad Bailey	So
DB	35	Mason Pack	Sr
LB	36	Joe Britton	Jr
LB	38	Bryson Clayton	So
DL	39	Chris Turner	Sr
LB	40	Cameron Wilkins	Jr
LB	41	Chance May	Jr
DB	43	Brandon Gregory Jr.	Fr
DB	45	Daval Torres	Fr
DB	46	Justin Efebera	Fr
LB	49	Marti Jr.	Sr
DL	52	Myles Eaddy	Sr
LB	53	Will Norris	Fr
DL	78	Kobie Whiteside	Sr
DL	90	Markell Utsey	Sr
LB	92	Z'Core Brooks	Fr
DL	93	Andrew Serrano	Fr
DL	95	Ben Key	Jr
DL	96	Cannon York	So
DL	97	Akial Byers	Sr
DL	98	Keion Willis	So
DL	99	Isaiah McGuire	So

Special teams

Pos.	#	Name	Class
P	19	Grant McKinniss	GS
LS	31	Drew Wise	Jr
LS	47	Daniel Hawthorne	Fr
LS	49	Jake Hoffman	So
PK	90	Sean Koetting	Jr
P	91	Josh Dodge	So
PK	92	Harrison Mevis	Fr
PK	93	Luke Bauer	Fr
PK	94	Aaron Rodriguez	Fr
PK	98	Logan Brock	Fr

Head coach

- Eliah Drinkwitz

Coordinators/assistant coaches

- Charlie Harbison – Associate head coach/defensive backs
- Ryan Walters – Defensive coordinator/safeties
- Erik Link – Special teams coordinator
- Brick Haley – Defensive line
- Bush Hamdan – Wide receivers/quarterbacks
- Casey Woods – Tight ends/recruiting coordinator
- David Gibbs – Secondary
- Marcus Johnson – Offensive line
- Curtis Luper – Running backs
- D. J. Smith – Linebackers

Legend

- (C) Team captain
- (S) Suspended
- (I) Ineligible
- Injured
- Redshirt

Roster
Last update: October 11, 2020

== Schedule ==
Missouri had games scheduled against BYU, Central Arkansas, Eastern Michigan, and Louisiana, which were all canceled due to the COVID-19 pandemic.

Date	Time	Opponent	Rank	Site	TV	Result	Attendance
September 26	6:00 p.m.	No. 2 Alabama		Faurot Field; Columbia, MO	ESPN	L 19–38	11,738
October 3	11:00 a.m.	at No. 21 Tennessee		Neyland Stadium; Knoxville, TN	SECN	L 12–35	21,159
October 10	11:00 a.m.	at No. 17 LSU		Faurot Field; Columbia, MO^{[a]}	SECN Alt.	W 45–41	10,013
October 24	3:00 p.m.	Kentucky^{†}		Faurot Field; Columbia, MO	SECN	W 20–10	11,738
October 31	6:30 p.m.	at No. 10 Florida		Ben Hill Griffin Stadium; Gainesville, FL	SECN Alt.	L 17–41	12,049
November 21	6:30 p.m.	at South Carolina		Williams–Brice Stadium; Columbia, SC	SECN Alt.	W 17–10	13,603
November 28^{[b]}	11:00 a.m.	Vanderbilt		Faurot Field; Columbia, MO	SECN	W 41–0	11,053
December 5	11:00 a.m.	Arkansas		Faurot Field; Columbia, MO (Battle Line Rivalry)	SECN	W 50–48	11,378
December 12	11:00 a.m.	No. 9 Georgia	No. 25	Faurot Field; Columbia, MO	SECN	L 14–49	10,830
December 19	2:30 p.m.	at Mississippi State		Davis Wade Stadium; Starkville, MS	SECN Alt.	L 32–51	11,748
December 30	3:00 p.m.	Iowa		Nissan Stadium; Nashville, TN	ESPN	No Contest	
^{†}Homecoming; Rankings from AP Poll and CFP Rankings (after November 24) released prior to game; All times are in Central time

^{^[a]}The game between Missouri and LSU was originally scheduled to take place in Baton Rouge, Louisiana. However, in light of Hurricane Delta, the game was moved to Columbia.
^{^[b]}The game between Vanderbilt and Missouri was originally scheduled to take place on October 17. However, due to COVID-19 management requirements in response to positive tests and subsequent quarantine of individuals within the Vanderbilt program, the game was rescheduled for December 12. The SEC postponed Tennessee vs. Vanderbilt to facilitate the rescheduling of the Vanderbilt-Missouri game. The shuffling allows for the opportunity for all 14 SEC teams to play 10 regular-season games.

== Games Summaries ==
=== No. 2 Alabama ===
Team	1	2	3	4	Total
• No. 2 Alabama	14	14	7	3	38
Missouri	0	3	3	13	19

- Date: September 26
- Location: Columbia, MO
- Game start: 6:10 p.m.
- Game attendance: 11,738
- Game weather: 79, Clear, Wind S @ 9 mph
- Referee: Alex Moore
- TV announcers (ESPN): Sean McDonough (play-by-play), Todd Blackledge (color), Allison Williams and Todd McShay (sideline)

Statistics	Alabama	Missouri
First downs	22	20
Total yards	414	322
Rushing yards	111	69
Passing yards	303	253
Turnovers	1	2
Time of possession	31:25	28:35

Team	Category	Player	Statistics
Alabama	Passing	Mac Jones	18–24, 249 yards, 2 TDs
Alabama	Rushing	Najee Harris	17 carries, 98 yards, 3 TDs
Alabama	Receiving	Jaylen Waddle	8 receptions, 134 yards, 2 TDs
Missouri	Passing	Shawn Robinson	19–25, 185 yards, 1 TD
Missouri	Rushing	Larry Rountree III	14 carries, 67 yards
Missouri	Receiving	Jalen Knox	5 receptions, 63 yards

=== At No. 21 Tennessee ===
Missouri at Tennessee

Quarter	1	2	3	4	Total
Missouri	0	6	6	0	12
No. 21 Tennessee	7	14	7	7	35

at Neyland Stadium, Knoxville, TN

- Date: October 3
- Game time: 12:00 p.m.
- Game weather: Sunny, 55 °F (13 °C)
- Game attendance: 21,159
- Referee: Steve Marlow
- TV announcers (SECN): Dave Neal (play-by-play), D. J. Shockley (color), and Dawn Davenport (sidelines)

=== No. 17 LSU ===
	1	2	3	4	Total
No. 17 LSU	14	10	17	0	41
Missouri	14	10	14	7	45

=== Kentucky ===
Kentucky vs. Missouri

Quarter	1	2	3	4	Total
Wildcats	0	3	0	7	10
Tigers	7	3	7	3	20

at Faurot Field, Columbia, MO

- Date: October 24, 2020
- Game time: 4:00 p.m. EST
- Game weather: Cloudy • Temperature: 48 °F (9 °C) • Wind: NW 12-17mph
- Game attendance: 11,738
- Referee: Lee Hedrick
- TV: SECN

Statistics	UK	MIZ
First downs	8	26
Total yards	145	421
Rushing yards	95	220
Passing yards	50	201
Turnovers	1	0
Time of possession	16:50	43:10

Team	Category	Player	Statistics
Kentucky	Passing	Terry Wilson	4/11, 38 yards, TD
Kentucky	Rushing	Chris Rodriguez Jr.	9 carries, 48 yards
Kentucky	Receiving	Josh Ali	4 receptions, 47 yards, TD
Missouri	Passing	Connor Bazelak	21/30, 201 yards
Missouri	Rushing	Larry Rountree III	37 carries, 126 yards, 2 TD
Missouri	Receiving	Jalen Knox	5 receptions, 60 yards

=== At No. 10 Florida ===
Missouri Tigers at No. 10 Florida Gators – Game summary

Quarter	1	2	3	4	Total
Missouri	0	7	0	10	17
No. 10 Florida	6	14	14	7	41

at Ben Hill Griffin Stadium • Gainesville, FL

- Date: October 31, 2020
- Game time: 7:30 p.m.
- Game weather: Temperature: 76 °F (24 °C) • Wind: NE at 5 miles per hour (8.0 km/h) • Weather: Clear
- Game attendance: 12,049
- Referee: David Smith
- TV announcers (SECN Alt.): Mike Morgan, Hutson Mason, Taylor Davis
- Boxscore

Game information

First quarter

- Florida – Chris Howard 28-yard field goal, 9:07
- Florida – Chris Howard 32-yard field goal, 2:10

Second quarter

- Missouri – Jarvis Ware 59-yard interception return (Harrison Mevis kick), 12:54
- Florida – Kadarius Toney 18-yard pass from Kyle Trask (Chris Howard kick), 1:41
- Florida – Kadarius Toney 30-yard pass from Kyle Trask (Chris Howard kick), 1:08

Third quarter

- Florida – Kadarius Toney 16-yard run (Chris Howard kick), 10:36
- Florida – Justin Shorter 2-yard pass from Kyle Trask (Chris Howard kick), 0:22

Fourth quarter

- Missouri – Harrison Mevis 29-yard field goal, 10:56
- Florida – Trevon Grimes 18-yard pass from Kyle Trask (Chris Howard kick), 7:50
- Missouri – Larry Rountree III 5-yard run (Harrison Mevis kick), 3:18

Passing leaders

- MIZZ – Connor Bazelak – 26/40, 208 yards
- FLA – Kyle Trask – 21/36, 345 yards, 4 touchdowns, 1 interception

Rushing leaders

- MIZZ – Larry Rountree III – 14 carries, 36 yards, 1 touchdown
- FLA – Kyle Trask – 6 carries, 47 yards

Receiving leaders

- MIZZ – Keke Chism – 5 receptions, 68 yards
- FLA – Kyle Pitts – 5 receptions, 81 yards

Tackling leaders

- MIZZ – Devin Nicholson – 13 tackles
- FLA – Jeremiah Moon and Brad Stewart – 6 tackles

=== At South Carolina ===
Missouri Tigers (2–3) at South Carolina Gamecocks (2–5)

Quarter	1	2	3	4	Total
Tigers	7	10	0	0	17
Gamecocks	0	0	3	7	10

at Williams–Brice Stadium • Columbia, SC

- Date: November 21, 2020
- Game time: 6:30 p.m. CDT
- Game weather: • Temperature:
- Game attendance: 13,603
- TV: SECN Alt.

Game information

First Quarter

Second Quarter

Third Quarter

Fourth Quarter

Statistics	MIZ	SC
First downs	19	18
Total yards	301	283
Rushes/yards	34/98	36/114
Passing yards	203	169
Passing: Comp–Att–Int	21-33-1	20-33-1
Time of possession	28:34	31:26

Team	Category	Player	Statistics
Missouri	Passing	Connor Bazelak	21-33, 203 yards, 1 TD, 1 INT
Missouri	Rushing	Larry Rountree III	21 carries, 58 yards, 1 TD
Missouri	Receiving	Keke Chism	6 receptions, 57 yards
South Carolina	Passing	Luke Doty	14-23, 130 yards, 1 INT
South Carolina	Rushing	Luke Doty	11 carries, 59 yards
South Carolina	Receiving	Nick Muse	6 receptions, 67 yards

=== Vanderbilt ===
	1	2	3	4	Total
Commodores	0	0	0	0	0
Tigers	7	14	6	14	41

Statistics

Statistics	VAN	MIZ
First downs	13	31
Total yards	185	603
Rushing yards	82	223
Passing yards	103	380
Turnovers	1	0
Time of possession	27:10	32:50

Team	Category	Player	Statistics
Vanderbilt	Passing	Ken Seals	11/18, 79 yards
Vanderbilt	Rushing	Keyon Henry-Brooks	15 rushes, 64 yards
Vanderbilt	Receiving	Camron Johnson	5 receptions, 33 yards
Missouri	Passing	Connor Bazelak	30/37, 318 yards
Missouri	Rushing	Larry Rountree III	21 rushes, 160 yards, 3 TD
Missouri	Receiving	Tyler Badie	7 receptions, 102 yards

=== Arkansas ===
Game Eight – Arkansas Razorbacks (3–5) vs. Missouri Tigers (4–3)

Quarter	1	2	3	4	Total
Razorbacks	6	21	6	15	48
Tigers	10	10	3	27	50

at Faurot Field • Columbia, Missouri

- Date: Saturday, December 5, 2020
- Game time: 11:00 a.m. CST
- Game weather: Clear • Temperature: 52 °F (11 °C) • Wind: W 3 mph
- Game attendance: 11,738
- Referee: Lee Hedrick
- TV announcers (SEC Network): Dave Neal (play-by-play), D. J. Shockley (analyst), Dawn Davenport (sideline)

Game information

First quarter

- (12:12) MIZ – Harrison Mevis 51 yard field goal (Drive: 7 plays, 37 yards, 2:48; Missouri 3–0)
- (6:17) MIZ – Larry Rountree 2 yard rush, Harrison Mevis kick (Drive: 12 plays, 69 yards, 5:19; Missouri 10–0)
- (1:48) ARK – Blake Kern 2 yard pass from KJ Jefferson, kick failed (Drive: 12 plays, 75 yards, 4:29; Missouri 10–6)

Second quarter

- (11:56) MIZ – Harrison Mevis 29 yard field goal (Drive: 12 plays, 63 yards, 4:52; Missouri 13–6)
- (11:16) ARK – Treylon Burks 68 yard pass from KJ Jefferson, A.J. Reed kick (Drive: 3 plays, 89 yards, 0:35; Tied 13–13)
- (7:45) MIZ – Larry Rountree 6 yard rush, Harrison Mevis kick (Drive: 8 plays, 75 yards, 3:31; Missouri 20–13)
- (3:39) ARK – Trelon Smith 8 yard rush, A.J. Reed kick (Drive: 13 plays, 75 yards, 4:06; Tied 20–20)
- (0:20) ARK – KJ Jefferson 1 yard rush, A.J. Reed kick (Drive: 9 plays, 70 yards, 1:50; Arkansas 27–20)

Third quarter

- (10:23) MIZ – Harrison Mevis 37 yard field goal (Drive: 6 plays, 60 yards, 3:07; Arkansas 27–23)
- (8:18) ARK – Trelon Smith 15 yard rush, kick failed (Drive: 8 plays, 75 yards, 2:05; Arkansas 33–23)

Fourth quarter

- (14:51) MIZ – Harrison Mevis 40 yard field goal (Drive: 14 plays, 61 yards, 5:34; Arkansas 33–26)
- (13:15) ARK – Trelon Smith 16 yard rush, A.J. Reed kick (Drive: 7 plays, 75 yards, 1:35; Arkansas 40–26)
- (12:41) MIZ – Tyler Badie 46 yard rush, Harrison Mevis kick (Drive: 2 plays, 75 yards, 0:34; Arkansas 40–33)
- (7:46) MIZ – Larry Rountree 9 yard rush, Harrison Mevis kick (Drive: 8 plays, 82 yards, 2:07; Tied 40–40)
- (4:47) MIZ – Tyler Badie 25 yard rush, Harrison Mevis kick (Drive: 4 plays, 80 yards, 1:26; Missouri 47–40)
- (0:43) ARK – Michael Woods II 14 yard pass from KJ Jefferson, 2-point pass good (Drive: 13 plays, 75 yards, 4:04; Arkansas 48–47)
- (0:00) MIZ – Harrison Mevis 32 yard field goal (Drive: 7 plays, 60 yards, 0:43; Missouri 50–48)

Statistics	ARK	MIZ
First downs	34	37
Plays–yards	84–566	87–653
Rushes–yards	50–292	38–273
Passing yards	274	380
Passing: comp–att–int	18–34–0	32–49–0
Time of possession	26:28	33:32

Team	Category	Player	Statistics
Arkansas	Passing	KJ Jefferson	18/33, 274 yards, 3 TD
Arkansas	Rushing	Trelon Smith	26 carries, 172 yards, 3 TD
Arkansas	Receiving	Treylon Burks	10 receptions, 206 yards, 1 TD
Missouri	Passing	Connor Bazelak	32/49, 380 yards
Missouri	Rushing	Larry Rountree III	27 carries, 185 yards, 3 TD
Missouri	Receiving	Keke Chism	6 receptions, 113 yards

=== No. 9 Georgia ===
	1	2	3	4	Total
No. 9 Georgia	14	7	21	7	49
No. 25 Missouri	0	14	0	0	14

=== At Mississippi State ===
	1	2	3	4	Total
Tigers	7	3	8	14	32
Bulldogs	14	13	7	17	51

Statistics

Statistics	MIZ	MSST
First downs	22	24
Total yards	342	446
Rushing yards	101	151
Passing yards	241	295
Turnovers	4	3
Time of possession	28:57	31:03

Team	Category	Player	Statistics
Missouri	Passing	Connor Bazelak	22–38, 225 yards, 2 TD, 3 INT
Missouri	Rushing	Larry Rountree III	25 rushes, 121 yards, 2 TD
Missouri	Receiving	Keke Chism	6 receptions, 64 yards, TD
Mississippi State	Passing	Will Rogers	21–36, 295 yards, 3 TD, INT
Mississippi State	Rushing	Jo'Quavious Marks	12 rushes, 70 yards, TD
Mississippi State	Receiving	Jaden Walley	5 receptions, 129 yards, TD

== Rankings ==
Ranking movements Legend: ██ Increase in ranking ██ Decrease in ranking — = Not ranked RV = Received votes
	Week																	
Poll	Pre	1	2	3	4	5	6	7	8	9	10	11	12	13	14	15	16	Final
AP	—	—*	RV	RV	—	—	—	RV	—	—	—	—	—	—	—	RV	—	—
Coaches	—	—*	—	—	—	—	—	RV	RV	RV	RV	RV	RV	RV	RV	RV	RV	—
CFP	Not released										—	—	—	—	—	25	—	Not released

== Players drafted into the NFL ==
Round	Pick	Player	Position	NFL club
2	58	Nick Bolton	ILB	Kansas City Chiefs
4	143	Tyree Gillespie	S	Las Vegas Raiders
5	151	Larry Borom	OT	Chicago Bears
6	188	Joshuah Bledsoe	S	New England Patriots
6	198	Larry Rountree III	RB	Los Angeles Chargers
