= 2020 Texas A&M Aggies football team =

American college football season

2020 Texas A&M Aggies football

Orange Bowl champion

Orange Bowl, W 41–27 vs. North Carolina
- Conference: Southeastern Conference
- Western Division

Ranking
- Coaches: No. 4
- AP: No. 4
- Record: 9–1 (8–1 SEC)
- Head coach: Jimbo Fisher (3rd season)
- Offensive coordinator: Darrell Dickey (3rd season)
- Offensive scheme: Pro-style
- Defensive coordinator: Mike Elko (3rd season)
- Base defense: 4–2–5
- Home stadium: Kyle Field

2020 Southeastern Conference football standings
	Conf.			Overall
Team	W		L	W		L
Eastern Division
No. 13 Florida x	8	–	2	8	–	4
No. 7 Georgia	7	–	2	8	–	2
Missouri	5	–	5	5	–	5
Kentucky	4	–	6	5	–	6
Tennessee*	3	–	7	3	–	7
South Carolina	2	–	8	2	–	8
Vanderbilt	0	–	9	0	–	9
Western Division
No. 1 Alabama x$#^	10	–	0	13	–	0
No. 4 Texas A&M	8	–	1	9	–	1
Auburn	6	–	4	6	–	5
LSU*	5	–	5	5	–	5
Ole Miss	4	–	5	5	–	5
Arkansas	3	–	7	3	–	7
Mississippi State	3	–	7	4	–	7
Championship: Alabama 52, Florida 46
# – College Football Playoff champion; ^ – College Football Playoff participant; $ – Conference champion; x – Division champion/co-champions; * – Tennessee vacated all wins due to NCAA violations. LSU was ineligible for postseason due to self imposed ban. Note: Due to COVID-19, the SEC played a conference-only schedule.; Rankings from AP Poll.

The 2020 Texas A&M Aggies football team represented Texas A&M University in the 2020 NCAA Division I FBS football season. The Aggies played their home games at Kyle Field in College Station, Texas, and competed in the Western Division of the Southeastern Conference (SEC). They were led by third-year head coach Jimbo Fisher. The Aggies finished the season 9–1 with a final ranking of #4 in both the AP and the Coaches poll.

== Preseason ==
=== SEC Media Days ===
In the preseason media poll, Texas A&M was predicted to finish in fourth in the West Division.

== Coaching staff ==
Name	Position	Season at Texas A&M
Jimbo Fisher	Head coach	3rd
Darrell Dickey	Offensive coordinator and Quarterbacks coach	3rd
Tommie Robinson	Running backs coach	1st
James Coley	Tight ends coach	1st
Dameyune Craig	Wide receivers coach	3rd
Josh Henson	Offensive line coach	2nd
Mike Elko	Defensive coordinator and safeties coach	3rd
T. J. Rushing	Defensive backs coach	1st
Terry Price	Defensive ends coach	9th
Elijah Robinson	Defensive line coach	3rd
Tyler Santucci	Linebackers coach	1st
Luke Huard	Offensive analyst	2nd
Jerry Schmidt	Strength and Conditioning Coach	3rd

== Schedule ==
Texas A&M announced its 2020 football schedule on August 7, 2019. The 2020 schedule consisted of 7 home, 4 away, and 1 neutral game in the regular season.

The Aggies had games scheduled against Abilene Christian, Fresno State, Colorado, and North Texas, which were canceled due to the COVID-19 pandemic. In place of the canceled games, Florida and Tennessee were added to the Aggies' schedule to fill out the 10-game, conference only format.

Date	Time	Opponent	Rank	Site	TV	Result	Attendance
September 26	6:30 p.m.	Vanderbilt	No. 10	Kyle Field; College Station, TX	SECN Alt.	W 17–12	24,073
October 3	2:30 p.m.	at No. 2 Alabama	No. 13	Bryant–Denny Stadium; Tuscaloosa, AL	CBS	L 24–52	19,424
October 10	11:00 a.m.	No. 4 Florida	No. 21	Kyle Field; College Station, TX	ESPN	W 41–38	24,709
October 17	3:00 p.m.	at Mississippi State	No. 11	Davis Wade Stadium; Starkville, MS	ESPN	W 28–14	13,142
October 31	6:30 p.m.	Arkansas	No. 8	Kyle Field; College Station, TX (rivalry)	SECN	W 42–31	27,114
November 7	6:00 p.m.	at South Carolina	No. 7	Williams–Brice Stadium; Columbia, SC	ESPN	W 48–3	16,253
November 28	6:00 p.m.	LSU	No. 5	Kyle Field; College Station, TX (rivalry)	ESPN	W 20–7	23,607
December 5	11:00 a.m.	at Auburn	No. 5	Jordan–Hare Stadium; Auburn, AL	ESPN	W 31–20	18,297
December 19	11:00 a.m.	at Tennessee	No. 5	Neyland Stadium; Knoxville, TN	ESPN	W 34–13	22,645
January 2, 2021	7:00 p.m.	vs. No. 13 North Carolina*	No. 5	Hard Rock Stadium; Miami Gardens, FL (Orange Bowl)	ESPN	W 41–27	13,737
*Non-conference game; Rankings from AP Poll and CFP Rankings (after November 24) released prior to game; All times are in Central time

== Rankings ==
Ranking movements Legend: ██ Increase in ranking ██ Decrease in ranking
	Week																	
Poll	Pre	1	2	3	4	5	6	7	8	9	10	11	12	13	14	15	16	Final
AP	13	13*	10	10	13	21	11	7	8	7	5	5	5	5	5	5	5	4
Coaches	13	13*	10	11	13	20	11	9	8	7	6	6	6	6	5	5	5	4
CFP	Not released												5	5	5	5	5	Not released

== Personnel ==
2020 Texas A&M Aggies football team roster
Players
Coaches
Offense

Pos.	#	Name	Class
RB	0	Ainias Smith	So
WR	1	Demond Demas	Fr
WR	2	Chase Lane	Fr
WR	3	Devin Price	Fr
WR	4	Dylan Wright	Fr
WR	5	Jalen Preston	So
RB	6	De'Von Achane	Fr
WR	7	Moose Muhammad III	Fr
RB	8	Connor Blumrick	Jr
WR	9	Hezekiah Jones	Jr
QB	10	Zach Calzada	Fr
QB	11	Kellen Mond	Sr
QB	13	Haynes King	Fr
WR	14	Camron Buckley	Sr
QB	15	Logan Fisher	Fr
WR	16	Kenyon Jackson	Fr
RB	17	A. J. Sanders	Sr
QB	19	Colton Taylor	GS

Defense

Pos.	#	Name	Class
DB	0	Myles Jones	Sr
LB	1	Buddy Johnson	Sr
DL	2	Michael Clemons	GS
DL	3	Tyree Johnson	Jr
DB	4	Erick Young	So
DL	5	Bobby Brown III	Jr
DL	6	Derick Hunter Jr.	Fr
DB	7	Devin Morris	Jr
DL	8	DeMarvin Leal	So
DB	9	Leon O'Neal Jr.	Jr
DL	10	Fadil Diggs	Fr
DB	11	Travon Fuller	GS
LB	12	Braden White	GS
DB	13	Brian Williams	So
DB	14	Keldrick Carper	GS
DL	15	Jeremiah Martin	Jr
DB	16	Brian George	Jr
DB	17	Jaylon Jones	Fr
DL	18	Donnell Harris Jr.	Fr

Special teams

Pos.	#	Name	Class
K	36	Caden Davis	Fr
K	38	Drew Riethman	GS
DS	39	Jake Pagel	Jr
DS	40	Connor Choate	So
K	47	Seth Small	Jr
DS	48	Jacob Graham	Fr
P, K	48	Alan Guerrieri	Fr
DS	58	Garrett Townsend	Fr
K	94	Drake Bhatia	Fr
P	95	Nik Constantinou	Fr

Head coach

- Jimbo Fisher

Coordinators/assistant coaches

- Darrell Dickey
  Offensive coordinator/quarterbacks
- Mike Elko
  Defensive coordinator/safeties
- James Coley
  Tight ends
- Dameyune Craig
  Wide receivers
- Josh Henson
  Offensive line
- Terry Price
  Defensive ends
- Elijah Robinson
  Defensive line
- Tommie Robinson
  Running backs
- T. J. Rushing
  Defensive backs
- Tyler Santucci
  Linebackers

Legend

- (C) Team captain
- (S) Suspended
- (I) Ineligible
- Injured
- Redshirt

Roster
Last update: May 28, 2026

== Game summaries ==
=== Vanderbilt ===
Vanderbilt Commodores at No. 10 Texas A&M Aggies – Game summary

Quarter	1	2	3	4	Total
Commodores	3	2	7	0	12
No. 10 Aggies	7	0	7	3	17

at Kyle Field, College Station, Texas

- Date: September 26
- Game time: 6:30 p.m. CDT
- Game weather: 88 °F (31 °C)
- Game attendance: 24,073
- Referee: James Carter
- TV announcers (SECN Alt.): Mike Morgan and Andre Ware
- Box score, Recap

Game information
First quarter
- VAN – Pierson Cooke 33-yard field goal, 8:58. Commodores 3–0. Drive: 13 plays, 60 yards, 6:02.
- TAMU – Ainias Smith 25-yard run (Seth Small kick), 3:33. Aggies 7–3. Drive: 7 plays, 75 yards, 3:25.

Second quarter

- VAN – Texas A&M personal foul penalty in own end zone, 7:23. Aggies 7–5.

Third quarter

- TAMU – Caleb Chapman 17-yard pass from Kellen Mond (Seth Small kick), 13:20. Aggies 14–5. Drive: 3 plays, 75 yards, 1:40.
- VAN – Amir Abdur-Rahman 7-yard pass from Ken Seals (Pierson Cooke kick), 2:45. Aggies 14–12. Drive: 9 plays, 43 yards, 4:22.

Fourth quarter

- TAMU – Seth Small 24-yard field goal, 14:00. Aggies 17–12. Drive: 9 plays, 68 yards, 3:45.

Statistics	VAN	TAMU
First downs	17	17
Total yards	255	372
Rushing yards	105	183
Passing yards	150	189
Turnovers	2	3
Time of possession	33:59	26:01

Team	Category	Player	Statistics
Vanderbilt	Passing	Ken Seals	20/29, 150 yards, TD, 2 INT
Vanderbilt	Rushing	Ja'Veon Marlow	16 rushes, 65 yards
Vanderbilt	Receiving	Amir Abdur-Rahman	5 receptions, 72 yards, TD
Texas A&M	Passing	Kellen Mond	17/28, 189 yards, TD
Texas A&M	Rushing	Isaiah Spiller	8 rushes, 117 yards
Texas A&M	Receiving	Caleb Chapman	4 receptions, 40 yards, TD

=== At No. 2 Alabama ===
No. 13 Texas A&M Aggies at No. 2 Alabama Crimson Tide – Game summary

Quarter	1	2	3	4	Total
No. 13 Aggies	7	7	3	7	24
No. 2 Crimson Tide	14	21	7	10	52

at Bryant–Denny Stadium, Tuscaloosa, Alabama

- Date: October 3
- Game time: 2:30 p.m. CDT
- Game weather: Sunny, 73 °F (23 °C)
- Game attendance: 19,424
- Referee: Jason Autrey
- TV announcers (CBS): Brad Nessler, Gary Danielson, and Jamie Erdahl
- Box score, Recap

Game information
First quarter
- ALA – John Metchie III 78-yard pass from Mac Jones (Will Reichard kick), 9:19. Crimson Tide 7–0. Drive: 3 plays, 80 yards, 1:18.
- ALA – Najee Harris 6-yard run (Will Reichard kick), 3:58. Crimson Tide 14–0. Drive: 7 plays, 66 yards, 3:14.
- TAMU – Ainias Smith 47-yard pass from Kellen Mond (Seth Small kick), 1:13. Crimson Tide 14–7. Drive: 5 plays, 75 yards, 2:45.

Second quarter

- TAMU – Ryan Renick 17-yard pass from Kellen Mond (Seth Small kick), 14:44. Tied 14–14. Drive: 1 play, 17 yards, 0:06.
- ALA – Najee Harris 2-yard run (Will Reichard kick), 9:07. Crimson Tide 21–14. Drive: 7 plays, 66 yards, 2:34.
- ALA – Daniel Wright 47-yard interception return (Will Reichard kick), 6:19. Crimson Tide 28–14.
- ALA – DeVonta Smith 2-yard pass from Mac Jones (Will Reichard kick), 0:22. Crimson Tide 35–14. Drive: 8 plays, 64 yards, 0:59.

Third quarter

- TAMU – Seth Small 29-yard field goal, 9:03. Crimson Tide 35–17. Drive: 12 plays, 40 yards, 4:59.
- ALA – Jaylen Waddle 87-yard pass from Mac Jones (Will Reichard kick), 7:24. Crimson Tide 42–17. Drive: 3 plays, 75 yards, 1:39.

Fourth quarter

- ALA – Will Reichard 27-yard field goal, 10:14. Crimson Tide 45–17. Drive: 10 plays, 68 yards, 5:32.
- TAMU – Ainias Smith 14-yard pass from Kellen Mond (Seth Small kick), 7:25. Crimson Tide 45–24. Drive: 7 plays, 75 yards, 2:49.
- ALA – John Metchie III 63-yard pass from Mac Jones (Will Reichard kick), 5:33. Crimson Tide 52–24. Drive: 4 plays, 75 yards, 1:52.

Statistics	TAMU	ALA
First downs	25	22
Total yards	450	544
Rushing yards	115	109
Passing yards	335	435
Turnovers	2	1
Time of possession	37:42	22:18

Team	Category	Player	Statistics
Texas A&M	Passing	Kellen Mond	25/44, 318 yards, 3 TD, INT
Texas A&M	Rushing	Haynes King	5 rushes, 43 yards
Texas A&M	Receiving	Ainias Smith	6 receptions, 123 yards, 2 TD
Alabama	Passing	Mac Jones	20/27, 435 yards, 4 TD, INT
Alabama	Rushing	Brian Robinson Jr.	10 rushes, 60 yards
Alabama	Receiving	John Metchie III	5 receptions, 181 yards, 2 TD

=== No. 4 Florida ===
No. 4 Florida Gators at No. 21 Texas A&M Aggies – Game summary

Quarter	1	2	3	4	Total
No. 4 Gators	14	7	7	10	38
No. 21 Aggies	7	10	7	7	31

at Kyle Field, College Station, Texas

- Date: October 10
- Game time: 11:00 a.m. CDT
- Game weather: 72 °F (22 °C)
- Game attendance: 24,709
- Referee: Steve Marlowe
- TV announcers (ESPN): Dave Pasch, Greg McElroy, and Holly Rowe
- Box score, Recap

Game information
First quarter
- FLA – Kyle Pitts 5-yard pass from Kyle Trask (Evan McPherson kick), 7:32. Gators 7–0. Drive: 17 plays, 75 yards, 7:28.
- TAMU – Chase Lane 11-yard pass from Kellen Mond (Seth Small kick), 3:59. Tied 7–7. Drive: 7 plays, 75 yards, 3:33.
- FLA – Kadarius Toney 11-yard pass from Kyle Trask (Evan McPherson kick), 1:42. Gators 14–7. Drive: 5 plays, 75 yards, 2:17.

Second quarter

- TAMU – Caleb Chapman 2-yard pass from Kellen Mond (Seth Small kick), 9:33. Tied 14–14. Drive: 14 plays, 94 yards, 7:09.
- FLA – Nay'Quan Wright 1-yard run (Evan McPherson kick), 4:14. Gators 21–14. Drive: 11 plays, 75 yards, 5:19.
- TAMU – Seth Small 19-yard field goal, 0:00. Gators 21–17. Drive: 14 plays, 73 yards, 4:14.

Third quarter

- FLA – Kadarius Toney 37-yard pass from Kyle Trask (Evan McPherson kick), 9:38. Gators 28–17. Drive: 6 plays, 90 yards, 3:35.
- TAMU – Isaiah Spiller 3-yard run (Seth Small kick), 4:18. Gators 28–24. Drive: 10 plays, 75 yards, 5:20.

Fourth quarter

- TAMU – Isaiah Spiller 19-yard run (Seth Small kick), 12:35. Aggies 31–28. Drive: 10 plays, 66 yards, 5:42.
- FLA – Evan McPherson 53-yard field goal, 9:54. Tied 31–31. Drive: 7 plays, 40 yards, 2:41.
- FLA – Dameon Pierce 1-yard pass from Kyle Trask (Evan McPherson kick), 6:14. Gators 38–31. Drive: 5 plays, 37 yards, 2:12.
- TAMU – Caleb Chapman 51-yard pass from Kellen Mond (Seth Small kick), 4:30. Tied 38–38. Drive: 4 plays, 75 yards, 1:44.
- TAMU – Seth Small 26-yard field goal, 0:00. Aggies 41–38. Drive: 8 plays, 40 yards, 3:40.

Statistics	FLA	TAMU
First downs	22	32
Total yards	402	543
Rushing yards	90	205
Passing yards	312	338
Turnovers	1	1
Time of possession	25:23	34:37

Team	Category	Player	Statistics
Florida	Passing	Kyle Trask	23/32, 312 yards, 4 TD
Florida	Rushing	Nay'Quan Wright	6 rushes, 31 yards, TD
Florida	Receiving	Kadarius Toney	7 receptions, 92 yards, 2 TD
Texas A&M	Passing	Kellen Mond	25/35, 338 yards, 3 TD
Texas A&M	Rushing	Isaiah Spiller	27 rushes, 174 yards, 2 TD
Texas A&M	Receiving	Caleb Chapman	9 receptions, 151 yards, 2 TD

=== At Mississippi State ===
No. 11 Texas A&M Aggies at Mississippi State Bulldogs – Game summary

Quarter	1	2	3	4	Total
No. 11 Aggies	0	14	14	0	28
Bulldogs	0	0	7	7	14

at Davis Wade Stadium, Starkville, Mississippi

- Date: October 17
- Game time: 3:00 p.m. CDT
- Game weather: Clear, 68 °F (20 °C)
- Game attendance: 13,142
- Referee: Lee Hedrick
- TV announcers (ESPN): Dave Neal and D. J. Shockley
- Box score, Recap

Game information
First quarter
- No scoring plays

Second quarter

- TAMU – Isaiah Spiller 3-yard run (Seth Small kick), 14:57. Aggies 7–0. Drive: 8 plays, 66 yards, 4:16.
- TAMU – Isaiah Spiller 1-yard run (Seth Small kick), 13:27. Aggies 14–0. Drive: 1 play, 1 yard, 0:04.

Third quarter

- MSST – Emmanuel Forbes 60-yard interception return (Brandon Ruiz kick), 11:38. Aggies 14–7.
- TAMU – Chase Lane 51-yard pass from Kellen Mond (Seth Small kick), 10:05. Aggies 21–7. Drive: 4 plays, 75 yards, 1:33.
- TAMU – Ainias Smith 6-yard pass from Kellen Mond (Seth Small kick), 8:39. Aggies 28–7. Drive: 2 plays, 8 yards, 0:46.

Fourth quarter

- MSST – Malik Heath 32-yard pass from Will Rogers (Brandon Ruiz kick), 11:11. Aggies 28–14. Drive: 13 plays, 89 yards, 6:00.

Statistics	TAMU	MSST
First downs	17	15
Total yards	325	217
Rushing yards	186	-2
Passing yards	139	219
Turnovers	1	2
Time of possession	30:32	29:28

Team	Category	Player	Statistics
Texas A&M	Passing	Kellen Mond	13/23, 139 yards, 2 TD, INT
Texas A&M	Rushing	Isaiah Spiller	18 rushes, 114 yards, 2 TD
Texas A&M	Receiving	Chase Lane	2 receptions, 70 yards, TD
Mississippi State	Passing	Will Rogers	15/18, 120 yards, TD
Mississippi State	Rushing	Jo'Quavious Marks	7 rushes, 25 yards
Mississippi State	Receiving	Malik Heath	5 receptions, 57 yards, TD

=== Arkansas ===
Arkansas Razorbacks at No. 8 Texas A&M Aggies – Game summary

Quarter	1	2	3	4	Total
Razorbacks	7	7	3	14	31
No. 8 Aggies	14	14	14	0	42

at Kyle Field, College Station, Texas

- Date: October 31
- Game time: 6:30 p.m. CDT
- Game weather: 70 °F (21 °C)
- Game attendance: 27,114
- Referee: Marc Curles
- TV announcers (SECN): Taylor Zarzour and Matt Stinchcomb
- Box score, Recap

Game information
First quarter
- ARK – Treylon Burks 6-yard pass from Felipe Franks (A. J. Reed kick), 8:09. Razorbacks 7–0. Drive: 12 plays, 87 yards, 4:49.
- TAMU – Ainias Smith 35-yard pass from Kellen Mond (Seth Small kick), 3:57. Tied 7–7. Drive: 8 plays, 75 yards, 4:12.
- TAMU – Ainias Smith 15-yard run (Seth Small kick), 0:34. Aggies 14–7. Drive: 4 plays, 58 yards, 2:22.

Second quarter

- TAMU – Jalen Wydermyer 6-yard pass from Kellen Mond (Seth Small kick), 6:43. Aggies 21–7. Drive: 11 plays, 69 yards, 5:35.
- ARK – Tyson Morris 1-yard pass from Felipe Franks (A. J. Reed kick), 4:13. Aggies 21–14. Drive: 8 plays, 75 yards, 2:30.
- TAMU – Isaiah Spiller 6-yard run (Seth Small kick), 1:13. Aggies 28–14. Drive: 7 plays, 74 yards, 3:00.

Third quarter

- ARK – A. J. Reed 34-yard field goal, 10:22. Aggies 28–17. Drive: 11 plays, 58 yards, 4:38.
- TAMU – Jalen Wydermyer 15-yard pass from Kellen Mond (Seth Small kick), 5:22. Aggies 35–17. Drive: 9 plays, 75 yards, 5:00.
- TAMU – Devon Achane 30-yard run (Seth Small kick), 0:56. Aggies 42–17. Drive: 6 plays, 68 yards, 2:36.

Fourth quarter

- ARK – Treylon Burks 16-yard pass from Felipe Franks (A. J. Reed kick), 13:09. Aggies 42–24. Drive: 8 plays, 75 yards, 2:47.
- ARK – Rakeem Boyd 14-yard run (A. J. Reed kick), 0:36. Aggies 42–31. Drive: 6 plays, 69 yards, 1:29.

Statistics	ARK	TAMU
First downs	29	25
Total yards	461	442
Rushing yards	222	182
Passing yards	239	260
Turnovers	0	0
Time of possession	27:01	32:59

Team	Category	Player	Statistics
Arkansas	Passing	Feleipe Franks	23/31, 239 yards, 3 TD
Arkansas	Rushing	Rakeem Boyd	18 rushes, 100 yards, TD
Arkansas	Receiving	Treylon Burks	7 receptions, 112 yards, 2 TD
Texas A&M	Passing	Kellen Mond	21/26, 260 yards, 3 TD
Texas A&M	Rushing	Isaiah Spiller	21 rushes, 82 yards, TD
Texas A&M	Receiving	Jalen Wydermyer	6 receptions, 92 yards, 2 TD

=== At South Carolina ===
No. 7 Texas A&M Aggies at South Carolina Gamecocks – Game summary

Quarter	1	2	3	4	Total
No. 7 Aggies	7	14	13	14	48
Gamecocks	0	0	0	3	3

at Williams–Brice Stadium, Columbia, South Carolina

- Date: November 7
- Game time: 6:00 p.m. CST/7:00 p.m. EST
- Game weather: Clear, 72 °F (22 °C)
- Game attendance: 16,253
- Referee: Ken Williamson
- TV announcers (ESPN): Mark Jones and Dusty Dvoracek
- Box score, Recap

Game information
First quarter
- TAMU – Ainias Smith 3-yard pass from Kellen Mond (Seth Small kick), 4:04. Aggies 7–0. Drive: 12 plays, 52 yards, 5:57.

Second quarter

- TAMU – Jalen Wydermyer 15-yard pass from Kellen Mond (Seth Small kick), 9:05. Aggies 14–0. Drive: 10 plays, 70 yards, 5:47.
- TAMU – Jalen Wydermyer 7-yard pass from Kellen Mond (Seth Small kick), 0:14. Aggies 21–0. Drive: 6 plays, 73 yards, 2:51.

Third quarter

- TAMU – Kellen Mond 15-yard run (kick failed), 11:04. Aggies 27–0. Drive: 7 plays, 75 yards, 3:56.
- TAMU – De’Von Achane 52-yard pass from Kellen Mond (Seth Small kick), 6:55. Aggies 34–0. Drive: 1 play, 52 yards, 0:09.

Fourth quarter

- TAMU – De’Von Achane 3-yard run (Seth Small kick), 12:01. Aggies 41–0. Drive: 15 plays, 80 yards, 8:02.
- SC – Parker White 48-yard field goal, 5:55. Aggies 41–3. Drive: 13 plays, 43 yards, 6:06.
- TAMU – Max Wright 42-yard pass from Haynes King (Seth Small kick), 1:02. Aggies 48–3. Drive: 8 plays, 75 yards, 4:53.

Statistics	TAMU	SC
First downs	26	9
Total yards	530	150
Rushing yards	264	50
Passing yards	266	100
Turnovers	0	2
Time of possession	38:21	21:39

Team	Category	Player	Statistics
Texas A&M	Passing	Kellen Mond	16/26, 224 yards, 4 TD
Texas A&M	Rushing	Isaiah Spiller	18 rushes, 131 yards
Texas A&M	Receiving	De’Von Achane	2 receptions, 70 yards, TD
South Carolina	Passing	Collin Hill	8/21, 66 yards, 2 INT
South Carolina	Rushing	Kevin Harris	13 rushes, 39 yards
South Carolina	Receiving	Shi Smith	7 receptions, 64 yards

=== LSU ===
LSU Tigers at No. 5 Texas A&M Aggies – Game summary

Quarter	1	2	3	4	Total
Tigers	0	0	0	7	7
No. 5 Aggies	10	3	7	0	20

at Kyle Field, College Station, Texas

- Date: November 28
- Game time: 6:00 p.m. CST
- Game weather: Rain, 57 °F (14 °C)
- Game attendance: 23,607
- Referee: Ken Williamson
- TV announcers (ESPN): Bob Wischusen and Dan Orlovsky
- Box score, Recap

Game information
First quarter
- TAMU – Seth Small 41-yard field goal, 9:10. Aggies 3–0. Drive: 7 plays, 41 yards, 2:16.
- TAMU – Isaiah Spiller 52-yard run (Seth Small kick), 0:16. Aggies 10–0. Drive: 2 plays, 54 yards, 0:50.

Second quarter

- TAMU – Seth Small 40-yard field goal, 0:00. Aggies 13–0. Drive: 8 plays, 44 yards, 0:43.

Third quarter

- TAMU – Buddy Johnson 15-yard interception return (Seth Small kick), 4:36. Aggies 20–0.

Fourth quarter

- LSU – Terrace Marshall Jr. 3-yard pass from Max Johnson (Cade York kick), 0:38. Aggies 20–7. Drive: 14 plays, 81 yards, 4:31.

Statistics	LSU	TAMU
First downs	14	16
Total yards	267	267
Rushing yards	36	162
Passing yards	231	105
Turnovers	3	0
Time of possession	26:28	33:32

Team	Category	Player	Statistics
LSU	Passing	T. J. Finley	9/25, 118 yards, 2 INT
LSU	Rushing	Tyrion Davis-Price	11 rushes, 18 yards
LSU	Receiving	Terrace Marshall Jr.	10 receptions, 134 yards, TD
Texas A&M	Passing	Kellen Mond	11/34, 105 yards
Texas A&M	Rushing	Isaiah Spiller	28 rushes, 134 yards, TD
Texas A&M	Receiving	Ainias Smith	3 receptions, 36 yards

=== At Auburn ===
No. 5 Texas A&M Aggies at Auburn Tigers – Game summary

Quarter	1	2	3	4	Total
No. 5 Aggies	7	7	0	17	31
Tigers	0	10	10	0	20

at Jordan–Hare Stadium, Auburn, Alabama

- Date: December 5
- Game time: 11:00 a.m. CST
- Game weather: Sunny, 52 °F (11 °C)
- Game attendance: 18,297
- Referee: James Carter
- TV announcers (ESPN): Sean McDonough, Todd Blackledge, and Todd McShay
- Box score, Recap

Game information
First quarter
- TAMU – Jalen Wydermyer 10-yard pass from Kellen Mond (Seth Small kick), 8:42. Aggies 7–0. Drive: 11 plays, 75 yards, 6:18.

Second quarter

- AUB – Anders Carlson 37-yard field goal, 14:11. Aggies 7–3. Drive: 12 plays, 71 yards, 4:17.
- AUB – Bo Nix 5-yard run (Anders Carlson kick), 3:36. Tigers 10–7. Drive: 9 plays, 80 yards, 4:33.
- TAMU – Kellen Mond 1-yard run (Seth Small kick), 0:24. Aggies 14–10. Drive: 8 plays, 75 yards, 3:12.

Third quarter

- AUB – Bo Nix 3-yard run (Anders Carlson kick), 10:36. Tigers 17–14. Drive: 9 plays, 75 yards, 4:24.
- AUB – Anders Carlson 24-yard field goal, 4:16. Tigers 20–14. Drive: 8 plays, 72 yards, 3:38.

Fourth quarter

- TAMU – Jalen Wydermyer 20-yard pass from Kellen Mond (Seth Small kick), 13:31. Aggies 21–20. Drive: 11 plays, 75 yards, 5:45.
- TAMU – Ainias Smith 4-yard run (Seth Small kick), 8:12. Aggies 28–20. Drive: 7 plays, 77 yards, 3:42.
- TAMU – Seth Small 32-yard field goal, 1:09. Aggies 31–20. Drive: 12 plays, 55 yards, 5:32.

Statistics	TAMU	AUB
First downs	29	16
Total yards	509	340
Rushing yards	313	196
Passing yards	196	144
Turnovers	0	0
Time of possession	38:00	22:00

Team	Category	Player	Statistics
Texas A&M	Passing	Kellen Mond	18/23, 196 yards, 2 TD
Texas A&M	Rushing	Isaiah Spiller	20 rushes, 120 yards
Texas A&M	Receiving	Jalen Wydermyer	8 receptions, 89 yards, 2 TD
Auburn	Passing	Bo Nix	15/23, 144 yards
Auburn	Rushing	Tank Bigsby	9 rushes, 76 yards
Auburn	Receiving	Seth Williams	3 receptions, 51 yards

=== At Tennessee ===
No. 5 Texas A&M Aggies at Tennessee Volunteers – Game summary

Quarter	1	2	3	4	Total
No. 5 Aggies	7	17	0	10	34
Volunteers	7	6	0	0	13

at Neyland Stadium, Knoxville, Tennessee

- Date: December 19
- Game time: 11:00 a.m. CST/12:00 p.m. EST
- Game weather: Mostly cloudy, 38 °F (3 °C)
- Game attendance: 22,645
- Referee: James Carter
- TV announcers (ESPN): Bob Wischusen and Dan Orlovsky
- Box score, Recap

Game information
First quarter
- TENN – Jacob Warren 33-yard pass from Harrison Bailey (Toby Wilson kick), 12:28. Volunteers 7–0. Drive: 5 plays, 75 yards, 2:32.
- TAMU – Kellen Mond 5-yard run (Seth Small kick), 6:32. Tied 7–7. Drive: 10 plays, 75 yards, 5:56.

Second quarter

- TAMU – Isaiah Spiller 3-yard run (Seth Small kick), 13:17. Aggies 14–7. Drive: 12 plays, 69 yards, 6:12.
- TAMU – Seth Small 23-yard field goal, 5:52. Aggies 17–7. Drive: 9 plays, 33 yards, 5:30.
- TENN – Cedrick Tillman 46-yard pass from J. T. Shrout (kick failed), 4:08. Aggies 17–13. Drive: 4 plays, 75 yards, 1:44.
- TAMU – Ainias Smith 4-yard pass from Kellen Mond (Seth Small kick), 0:18. Aggies 24–13. Drive: 11 plays, 75 yards, 3:53.

Third quarter

- No scoring plays

Fourth quarter

- TAMU – Ainias Smith 1-yard run (Seth Small kick), 9:02. Aggies 31–13. Drive: 13 plays, 88 yards, 7:06.
- TAMU – Seth Small 21-yard field goal, 1:16. Aggies 34–13. Drive: 8 plays, 68 yards, 5:19.

Statistics	TAMU	TENN
First downs	28	13
Total yards	497	213
Rushing yards	216	24
Passing yards	281	189
Turnovers	1	2
Time of possession	44:09	15:51

Team	Category	Player	Statistics
Texas A&M	Passing	Kellen Mond	26/32, 281 yards, TD, INT
Texas A&M	Rushing	Isaiah Spiller	26 rushes, 89 yards, TD
Texas A&M	Receiving	Jalen Wydermyer	5 receptions, 71 yards
Tennessee	Passing	J. T. Shrout	6/14, 104 yards, TD, INT
Tennessee	Rushing	Ty Chandler	7 rushes, 31 yards
Tennessee	Receiving	Cedric Tillman	2 receptions, 61 yards, TD

=== Vs. No. 13 North Carolina (Orange Bowl) ===
2021 Orange Bowl
No. 5 Texas A&M Aggies vs. No. 13 North Carolina Tar Heels – Game summary

Quarter	1	2	3	4	Total
No. 5 Aggies	7	10	0	24	41
No. 13 Tar Heels	3	10	7	7	27

at Hard Rock Stadium, Miami Gardens, Florida

- Date: January 2, 2021
- Game time: 7:00 p.m. CST/8:00 p.m. EST
- Game weather: Clear, 73 °F (23 °C)
- Game attendance: 13,737
- Referee: Larry Smith
- TV announcers (ESPN): Bob Wischusen and Dan Orlovsky
- Box score, Recap

Game information
First quarter
- TAMU – Isaiah Spiller 9-yard run (Seth Small kick), 9:11. Aggies 7–0. Drive: 7 plays, 28 yards, 3:31.
- UNC – Grayson Atkins 29-yard field goal, 4:31. Aggies 7–3. Drive: 11 plays, 63 yards, 4:40.

Second quarter

- UNC – Grayson Atkins 32-yard field goal, 11:09. Aggies 7–6. Drive: 11 plays, 36 yards, 5:48.
- TAMU – Seth Small 25-yard field goal, 7:40. Aggies 10–6. Drive: 7 plays, 68 yards, 3:29.
- UNC – Dazz Newsome 28-yard pass from Sam Howell (Grayson Atkins kick), 4:56. Tar Heels 13–10. Drive: 8 plays, 75 yards, 2:44.
- TAMU – Isaiah Spiller 3-yard run (Seth Small kick), 0:20. Aggies 17–13. Drive: 8 plays, 75 yards, 4:36.

Third quarter

- UNC – Josh Downs 10-yard pass from Sam Howell (Grayson Atkins kick), 8:01. Tar Heels 20–17. Drive: 9 plays, 66 yards, 3:25.

Fourth quarter

- TAMU – Seth Small 23-yard field goal, 14:02. Tied 20–20. Drive: 12 plays, 74 yards, 5:31.
- UNC – Josh Downs 75-yard pass from Sam Howell (Grayson Atkins kick), 13:51. Tar Heels 27–20. Drive: 1 play, 75 yards, 0:11.
- TAMU – Kellen Mond 4-yard run (Seth Small kick), 10:11. Tied 27–27. Drive: 7 plays, 75 yards, 3:40.
- TAMU – De’Von Achane 76-yard run (Seth Small kick), 3:44. Aggies 34–27. Drive: 3 plays, 87 yards, 1:23.
- TAMU – De’Von Achane 1-yard run (Seth Small kick), 1:34. Aggies 41–27. Drive: 3 plays, 34 yards, 0:50.

Statistics	TAMU	UNC
First downs	19	18
Total yards	457	324
Rushing yards	225	90
Passing yards	232	234
Turnovers	0	1
Time of possession	32:13	27:47

Team	Category	Player	Statistics
Texas A&M	Passing	Kellen Mond	16/26, 232 yards
Texas A&M	Rushing	De’Von Achane	12 rushes, 140 yards, 2 TD
Texas A&M	Receiving	Ainias Smith	6 receptions, 125 yards
North Carolina	Passing	Sam Howell	18/31, 234 yards, 3 TD, INT
North Carolina	Rushing	British Brooks	15 rushes, 53 yards
North Carolina	Receiving	Josh Downs	4 receptions, 91 yards, TD

== Players drafted into the NFL ==
Round	Pick	Player	Position	NFL Club
3	66	Kellen Mond	QB	Minnesota Vikings
4	117	Bobby Brown III	DT	Los Angeles Rams
4	128	Dan Moore	OT	Pittsburgh Steelers
4	140	Buddy Johnson	ILB	Pittsburgh Steelers
