= Shawn Davis (American football) =

American football player (born 1997)

No. 30
- Position: Safety

Personal information
- Born: December 24, 1997 (age 28); Miami, Florida, U.S.
- Listed height: 6 ft 0 in (1.83 m)
- Listed weight: 206 lb (93 kg)

Career information
- High school: Miami Southridge
- College: Florida (2017–2020)
- NFL draft: 2021: 5th round, 165th overall pick

Career history
- Indianapolis Colts (2021)*; Green Bay Packers (2021)
- * Offseason or practice squad member only

Career NFL statistics
- Games played: 1
- Total tackles: 1
- Stats at Pro Football Reference

Shawn Davis (born December 24, 1997) is an American former professional football player who was a safety for the Green Bay Packers of the National Football League (NFL). He played college football for the Florida Gators and was selected by the Indianapolis Colts in the fifth round of the 2021 NFL draft.

== Early life ==
Davis grew up in Miami, Florida, and attended Miami Southridge High School. Davis committed to play college football at Florida over an offer from Miami.

== College career ==
Davis played mostly as a reserve and on special teams as a true freshman. Davis missed the first month of his sophomore season due to injury and finished the year with 22 tackles, two tackles for loss and five passes broken up. As a junior, he recorded 51 tackles, one tackle for loss, three passes defended, and three interceptions. He was named Southeastern Conference player of the Week after making a one-handed interception against Auburn, which he returned for 41 yards. Davis was ejected from Florida's season opener during his senior season for targeting.

== Professional career ==
Pre-draft measurables
Height	Weight	Arm length	Hand span	40-yard dash	Vertical jump	Broad jump	Bench press
5 ft 10 5/8 in (1.79 m)	202 lb (92 kg)	31 7/8 in (0.81 m)	9 1/2 in (0.24 m)	4.55 s	39.5 in (1.00 m)	10 ft 8 in (3.25 m)	17 reps
All values from Pro Day

Davis was selected by the Indianapolis Colts in the fifth round, 165th overall, of the 2021 NFL draft. On May 6, 2021, Davis officially signed with the Colts. He was waived on August 31, 2021, and re-signed to the practice squad the next day. On September 16, 2021, Davis was released from the practice squad.

On September 21, 2021, Davis signed with the Green Bay Packers practice squad. On December 18, he was signed to the active roster. On December 25, Davis made his NFL debut in the Packers' week 16 game against the Cleveland Browns, logging an assisted tackle in the 24–22 victory. He was waived/injured on August 30, 2022 and placed on injured reserve. He was released on September 8.

== NFL career statistics ==
=== Regular season ===
Year	Team	Games		Tackles					Interceptions						Fumbles	
Year	Team	GP	GS	Cmb	Solo	Ast	Sck	Sfty	PD	Int	Yds	Avg	Lng	TD	FF	FR
2021	GB	1	0	1	0	1	0.0	0	0	0	0	0	0	0	0	0
Career		1	0	1	0	1	0	0	0	0	0	0	0	0	0	0
Source: pro-football-reference.com
