= 2020 NCAA Division I FBS football rankings =

- Season: 2020
- Bowl season: 2020–21 bowl games
- Preseason No. 1: Clemson
- End of season champions: Alabama
- Conference with most teams in final AP poll: SEC, ACC, Big Ten, Big 12 (4)

Two human polls and a committee's selections comprise the 2020 National Collegiate Athletic Association (NCAA) Division I Football Bowl Subdivision (FBS) football rankings, in addition to various publications' preseason polls. Unlike most sports, college football's governing body, the NCAA, does not bestow a national championship at the FBS level. Instead, that title is bestowed by one or more different polling agencies. There are two main weekly polls that begin in the preseason—the AP Poll and the Coaches Poll. One additional poll, the College Football Playoff (CFP) ranking, is usually released starting midway through the season. The CFP rankings determine who makes the four-team playoff that determines the College Football Playoff National Champion. Due to scheduling impact from the COVID-19 pandemic, release of CFP rankings during the 2020 season was adjusted to have the first rankings issued on November 24 and the final rankings issued on December 20.

== Legend ==
	Increase in ranking
	Decrease in ranking
	Not ranked previous week
	Selected for College Football Playoff
(#–#)	Win–loss record
(Italics)	Number of first place votes
т	Tied with team above or below also with this symbol

== AP Poll ==
	Preseason Aug 24	Week 1 N/A (Note: No Rankings were announced, the top 25 rankings from the preseason remained the same.)	Week 2 Sep 13	Week 3 Sep 20	Week 4 Sep 27	Week 5 Oct 4	Week 6 Oct 11	Week 7 Oct 18	Week 8 Oct 25	Week 9 Nov 1	Week 10 Nov 8	Week 11 Nov 15	Week 12 Nov 22	Week 13 Nov 29	Week 14 Dec 6	Week 15 Dec 13	Week 16 Dec 20	Week 17 (Final) Jan 11	
1.	Clemson (38)		Clemson (1–0) (60)	Clemson (2–0) (59)	Clemson (2–0) (55)	Clemson (3–0) (52)	Clemson (4–0) (59)	Clemson (5–0) (54)	Clemson (6–0) (52)	Clemson (7–0) (33)	Alabama (6–0) (59)	Alabama (6–0) (60)	Alabama (7–0) (62)	Alabama (8–0) (62)	Alabama (9–0) (62)	Alabama (10–0) (62)	Alabama (11–0) (62)	Alabama (13–0) (61)	1.
2.	Ohio State* (21)		Alabama (0–0)	Alabama (0–0) (1)	Alabama (1–0) (3)	Alabama (2–0) (8)	Alabama (3–0) (2)	Alabama (4–0) (8)	Alabama (5–0) (10)	Alabama (6–0) (29)	Notre Dame (7–0) (2)	Notre Dame (8–0) (1)	Notre Dame (8–0)	Notre Dame (9–0)	Notre Dame (10–0)	Notre Dame (10–0)	Clemson (10–1)	Ohio State (7–1)	2.
3.	Alabama (2)		Oklahoma (1–0)	Oklahoma (1–0)	Florida (1–0)	Georgia (2–0)	Georgia (3–0) (1)	Notre Dame (4–0)	Ohio State (1–0)	Ohio State (2–0)	Ohio State (3–0)	Ohio State (3–0) (1)	Ohio State (4–0)	Ohio State (4–0)	Ohio State (5–0)	Ohio State (5–0)	Ohio State (6–0)	Clemson (10–2)	3.
4.	Georgia		Georgia (0–0)	Georgia (0–0)	Georgia (1–0)	Florida (2–0)	Notre Dame (3–0)	Georgia (3–1)	Notre Dame (5–0)	Notre Dame (6–0)	Clemson (7–1)	Clemson (7–1)	Clemson (7–1)	Clemson (8–1)	Clemson (9–1)	Clemson (9–1)	Notre Dame (10–1)	Texas A&M (9–1)	4.
5.	Oklahoma		Florida (0–0)	Florida (0–0)	Notre Dame (2–0)	Notre Dame (2–0)	North Carolina (3–0)	Ohio State (0–0)	Georgia (3–1)	Georgia (4–1)	Texas A&M (5–1)	Texas A&M (5–1)	Texas A&M (5–1)	Texas A&M (6–1)	Texas A&M (7–1)	Texas A&M (7–1)	Texas A&M (8–1)	Notre Dame (10–2)	5.
6.	LSU (1)		LSU (0–0) (1)	LSU (0–0) (1)	Ohio State (0–0) (4)	Ohio State (0–0) (2)	Ohio State (0–0)	Oklahoma State (3–0)	Oklahoma State (4–0)	Cincinnati (5–0)	Florida (4–1)	Florida (5–1)	Florida (6–1)	Florida (7–1)	Florida (8–1)	Cincinnati (8–0)	Cincinnati (9–0)	Oklahoma (9–2)	6.
7.	Penn State*		Notre Dame (1–0)	Notre Dame (2–0)	Auburn (1–0)	Miami (FL) (3–0)	Oklahoma State (3–0)	Texas A&M (3–1)	Cincinnati (4–0)	Texas A&M (4–1)	Cincinnati (6–0)	Cincinnati (7–0)	Cincinnati (8–0)	Cincinnati (8–0)	Cincinnati (8–0)	Indiana (6–1)	Indiana (6–1)	Georgia (8–2)	7.
8.	Florida		Auburn (0–0)	Auburn (0–0) т	Miami (FL) (3–0)	North Carolina (2–0)	Cincinnati (3–0)	Penn State (0–0)	Texas A&M (3–1)	Florida (3–1)	BYU (8–0)	BYU (8–0)	BYU (9–0)	BYU (9–0)	Indiana (6–1)	Iowa State (8–2)	Oklahoma (8–2)	Cincinnati (9–1)	8.
9.	Oregon*		Texas (1–0)	Texas (1–0) т	Texas (2–0)	Penn State (0–0)	Penn State (0–0)	Cincinnati (3–0)	Wisconsin (1–0)	BYU (7–0)	Miami (FL) (6–1)	Indiana (4–0)	Oregon (3–0)	Miami (FL) (7–1)	Miami (FL) (8–1)	Coastal Carolina (11–0)	Coastal Carolina (11–0)	Iowa State (9–3)	9.
10.	Notre Dame		Texas A&M (0–0)	Texas A&M (0–0)	Penn State (0–0)	Oklahoma State (3–0)	Florida (2–1)	Florida (2–1)	Florida (2–1)	Wisconsin (1–0)	Indiana (3–0)	Wisconsin (2–0)	Miami (FL) (7–1)	Indiana (5–1)	Iowa State (8–2)	Georgia (7–2)	Florida (8–3)	Northwestern (7–2)	10.
11.	Auburn		Oklahoma State (0–0)	North Carolina (1–0)	UCF (2–0)	Cincinnati (3–0)	Texas A&M (2–1)	Miami (FL) (4–1)	BYU (6–0)	Miami (FL) (5–1)	Oregon (1–0)	Oregon (2–0)	Northwestern (5–0)	Georgia (6–2)	Coastal Carolina (10–0)	Florida (8–2)	Georgia (7–2)	BYU (11–1)	11.
12.	Wisconsin*		North Carolina (1–0)	Miami (FL) (2–0)	North Carolina (1–0)	Oregon (0–0)	Oregon (0–0)	BYU (5–0)	Miami (FL) (4–1)	Oregon (0–0)	Georgia (4–2)	Miami (FL) (7–1)	Indiana (4–1)	Iowa State (7–2)	Georgia (6–2)	Oklahoma (7–2)	Iowa State (8–3)	Indiana (6–2)	12.
13.	Texas A&M		Cincinnati (0–0)	UCF (1–0)	Texas A&M (1–0)	Auburn (1–1)	Miami (FL) (3–1)	Oregon (0–0)	Michigan (1–0)	Indiana (2–0)	Wisconsin (1–0)	Georgia (4–2)	Georgia (5–2)	Oklahoma (6–2)	Oklahoma (7–2)	USC (5–0)	BYU (10–1)	Florida (8–4)	13.
14.	Texas		UCF (0–0)	Cincinnati (1–0)	Oregon (0–0)	Tennessee (2–0)	BYU (4–0)	North Carolina (3–1) т	Oregon (0–0)	Oklahoma State (4–1)	Oklahoma State (5–1)	Oklahoma State (5–1)	Oklahoma (6–2)	Coastal Carolina (9–0)	BYU (9–1)	BYU (10–1)	North Carolina (8–3)	Coastal Carolina (11–1)	14.
15.	Oklahoma State		Tennessee (0–0)	Oklahoma State (1–0)	Cincinnati (2–0)	BYU (3–0)	Auburn (2–1)	Wisconsin (0–0) т	North Carolina (4–1)	Coastal Carolina (6–0)	Coastal Carolina (7–0)	Coastal Carolina (7–0) т	Iowa State (6–2)	Marshall (7–0)	Northwestern (5–1)	Northwestern (6–1)	Northwestern (6–2)	Louisiana (10–1)	15.
16.	Michigan*		Memphis (1–0)	Tennessee (0–0)	Mississippi State (1–0)	Wisconsin (0–0)	Wisconsin (0–0)	SMU (5–0)	Kansas State (4–1)	Marshall (5–0)	Marshall (6–0)	Marshall (7–0) т	Coastal Carolina (8–0)	Northwestern (5–1)	USC (3–0)	North Carolina (8–3)	Louisiana (9–1)	Iowa (6–2)	16.
17.	USC*		Miami (FL) (1–0)	Memphis (1–0)	Oklahoma State (2–0)	LSU (1–1)	SMU (4–0)	Iowa State (3–1)	Indiana (1–0)	Iowa State (4–2)	Iowa State (5–2)	Iowa State (5–2)	Marshall (7–0)	USC (3–0)	Louisiana (9–1)	Louisiana (9–1)	Iowa (6–2)	Liberty (10–1)	17.
18.	North Carolina		Louisville (1–0)	BYU (1–0)	Oklahoma (1–1)	SMU (4–0)	Tennessee (2–1)	Michigan (0–0)	Penn State (0–1)	SMU (6–1)	Oklahoma (5–2)	Oklahoma (5–2)	Wisconsin (2–1)	Wisconsin (2–1)	Tulsa (6–1)	Iowa (6–2)	Miami (FL) (8–2)	North Carolina (8–4)	18.
19.	Minnesota*		Louisiana (1–0)	Louisiana (2–0)	Wisconsin (0–0)	Virginia Tech (2–0)	Michigan (0–0)	Virginia Tech (3–1)	Marshall (5–0)	Oklahoma (4–2)	SMU (7–1)	Northwestern (4–0)	USC (3–0)	Oklahoma State (6–2)	Iowa (5–2)	Miami (FL) (8–2)	San Jose State (7–0)	Texas (7–3)	19.
20.	Cincinnati		Virginia Tech (0–0)	Virginia Tech (0–0)	LSU (0–1)	Michigan (0–0)	Iowa State (3–1)	Kansas State (3–1)	Coastal Carolina (5–0)	USC (0–0)	USC (1–0)	USC (2–0)	Texas (5–2)	Louisiana (8–1)	North Carolina (7–3)	Tulsa (6–1)	Texas (6–3)	Oklahoma State (8–3)	20.
21.	UCF		BYU (1–0)	Pittsburgh (2–0)	Tennessee (1–0)	Texas A&M (1–1)	Louisiana (3–0)	Minnesota (0–0)	USC (0–0)	Boise State (2–0)	Texas (5–2)	Liberty (8–0)	Oklahoma State (5–2)	Oregon (3–1)	Colorado (4–0)	Texas (6–3)	USC (5–1)	USC (5–1)	21.
22.	Utah*		Army (2–0)	Army (2–0)	BYU (2–0)	Texas (2–1)	Kansas State (3–1)	Marshall (4–0)	SMU (5–1)	Texas (4–2)	Liberty (7–0)	Texas (5–2)	Auburn (5–2)	Tulsa (5–1)	Liberty (9–1)	Liberty (9–1)	Tulsa (6–2)	Miami (FL) (8–3)	22.
23.	Iowa State		Kentucky (0–0) т	Kentucky (0–0)	Michigan (0–0)	Louisiana (3–0)	Virginia Tech (2–1)	NC State (4–1)	Iowa State (3–2)	Michigan (1–1)	Northwestern (3–0)	Auburn (4–2)	Louisiana (7–1)	Washington (3–0)	Texas (6–3)	Buffalo (5–0)	Liberty (9–1)	Ball State (7–1)	23.
24.	Iowa*		Appalachian State (1–0) т	Louisville (1–1)	Pittsburgh (3–0)	Iowa State (2–1)	Minnesota (0–0)	USC (0–0)	Oklahoma (3–2)	Auburn (4–2)	Auburn (4–2)	Louisiana (7–1)	Tulsa (5–1)	Iowa (4–2)	Buffalo (4–0)	NC State (8–3)	NC State (8–3)	San Jose State (7–1)	24.
25.	Tennessee		Pittsburgh (1–0)	Marshall (2–0)	Memphis (1–0)	Minnesota (0–0)	USC (0–0)	Coastal Carolina (4–0)	Boise State (1–0)	Liberty (6–0)	Louisiana (6–1)	Tulsa (4–1)	North Carolina (6–2)	Liberty (9–1)	Wisconsin (2–2)	San Jose State (6–0)	Oregon (4–2)	Buffalo (6–1)	25.
	Preseason Aug 24	Week 1 N/A (Note: No Rankings were announced, the top 25 rankings from the preseason remained the same.)	Week 2 Sep 13	Week 3 Sep 20	Week 4 Sep 27	Week 5 Oct 4	Week 6 Oct 11	Week 7 Oct 18	Week 8 Oct 25	Week 9 Nov 1	Week 10 Nov 8	Week 11 Nov 15	Week 12 Nov 22	Week 13 Nov 29	Week 14 Dec 6	Week 15 Dec 13	Week 16 Dec 20	Week 17 (Final) Jan 11	
		None	Dropped: Ohio State; Penn State; Oregon; Wisconsin; Michigan; USC; Minnesota; Utah; Iowa State; Iowa	Dropped: Appalachian State	Dropped: Louisiana; Virginia Tech; Army; Kentucky; Louisville; Marshall	Dropped: Oklahoma; UCF; Mississippi State; Pittsburgh; Memphis	Dropped: LSU; Texas	Dropped: Auburn; Tennessee; Louisiana	Dropped: Virginia Tech; Minnesota; NC State	Dropped: North Carolina; Kansas State; Penn State	Dropped: Boise State; Michigan	Dropped: SMU	Dropped: Liberty	Dropped: Texas; Auburn; North Carolina	Dropped: Marshall; Oklahoma State; Oregon; Washington	Dropped: Colorado; Wisconsin	Dropped: Buffalo	Dropped: Tulsa; NC State; Oregon	

*Teams whose season had been suspended were still ranked in the preseason poll; such teams were not considered after Week 1.

== Coaches Poll ==
	Preseason Aug 6	Week 1 N/A (Note: No Rankings were announced, the top 25 rankings from the preseason remained the same.)	Week 2 Sep 13	Week 3 Sep 20	Week 4 Sep 27	Week 5 Oct 4	Week 6 Oct 11	Week 7 Oct 18	Week 8 Oct 25	Week 9 Nov 1	Week 10 Nov 8	Week 11 Nov 15	Week 12 Nov 22	Week 13 Nov 29	Week 14 Dec 6	Week 15 Dec 13	Week 16 Dec 20	Week 17 (Final) Jan 12	
1.	Clemson (38)		Clemson (1–0) (37)	Clemson (2–0) (44)	Clemson (2–0) (42)	Clemson (3–0) (46)	Clemson (4–0) (55)	Clemson (5–0) (52)	Clemson (6–0) (52)	Clemson (7–0) (43)	Alabama (6–0) (55)	Alabama (6–0) (56)	Alabama (7–0) (59)	Alabama (8–0) (59)	Alabama (9–0) (59)	Alabama (10–0) (60)	Alabama (11–0) (61)	Alabama (13–0) (60)	1.
2.	Ohio State (17)		Alabama (0–0) (1)	Alabama (0–0) (1)	Alabama (1–0) (4)	Alabama (2–0) (14)	Alabama (3–0) (5)	Alabama (4–0) (8)	Alabama (5–0) (8)	Alabama (6–0) (17)	Notre Dame (7–0) (4)	Notre Dame (8–0) (3)	Notre Dame (8–0) (2)	Notre Dame (9–0) (2)	Notre Dame (10–0) (2)	Notre Dame (10–0) (2)	Clemson (10–1)	Ohio State (7–1)	2.
3.	Alabama (4)		Oklahoma (1–0)	Oklahoma (1–0) т	Florida (1–0)	Georgia (2–0) т	Georgia (3–0)	Notre Dame (4–0)	Ohio State (1–0) (2)	Ohio State (2–0) (2)	Ohio State (3–0) (3)	Ohio State (3–0) (2)	Ohio State (4–0) (1)	Clemson (8–1)	Clemson (9–1)	Clemson (9–1)	Ohio State (6–0)	Clemson (10–2)	3.
4.	Georgia		Georgia (0–0)	Georgia (0–0) т	Georgia (1–0)	Florida (2–0) т	Notre Dame (3–0)	Georgia (3–1)	Notre Dame (5–0)	Notre Dame (6–0)	Clemson (7–1)	Clemson (7–1)	Clemson (7–1)	Ohio State (4–0) (1)	Ohio State (5–0)	Ohio State (5–0)	Notre Dame (10–1)	Texas A&M (9–1)	4.
5.	LSU		LSU (0–0) (3)	LSU (0–0) (1)	Notre Dame (2–0)	Notre Dame (2–0)	Ohio State (0–0) (2)	Ohio State (0–0) (2)	Georgia (3–1)	Georgia (4–1)	Florida (4–1)	Florida (5–1)	Florida (6–1)	Florida (7–1)	Texas A&M (7–1)	Texas A&M (7–1)	Texas A&M (8–1)	Notre Dame (10–2)	5.
6.	Oklahoma		Florida (0–0)	Florida (0–0)	Ohio State (0–0) (2)	Ohio State (0–0) (2)	North Carolina (3–0)	Oklahoma State (3–0)	Oklahoma State (4–0)	Cincinnati (5–0)	Texas A&M (5–1)	Texas A&M (5–1)	Texas A&M (5–1)	Texas A&M (6–1)	Florida (8–1)	Cincinnati (8–0)	Cincinnati (9–0)	Oklahoma (9–2)	6.
7.	Penn State		Notre Dame (1–0)	Notre Dame (0–0)	Auburn (1–0)	Miami (FL) (3–0)	Oklahoma State (3–0)	Penn State (0–0)	Cincinnati (4–0)	Texas A&M (4–1)	Cincinnati (6–0)	Cincinnati (7–0)	Cincinnati (8–0)	Cincinnati (8–0)	Cincinnati (8–0)	Indiana (6–1)	Oklahoma (8–2)	Georgia (8–2)	7.
8.	Florida		Texas (1–0)	Auburn (0–0)	Miami (FL) (3–0)	Penn State (0–0)	Penn State (0–0)	Florida (2–1)	Texas A&M (3–1)	Florida (3–1)	BYU (8–0)	BYU (8–0)	BYU (9–0)	BYU (9–0)	Miami (FL) (8–1)	Iowa State (8–2)	Indiana (6–1)	Cincinnati (9–1)	8.
9.	Oregon		Auburn (0–0)	Texas (1–0)	Texas (2–0)	North Carolina (2–0)	Florida (2–1)	Texas A&M (3–1)	Florida (2–1)	BYU (7–0)	Miami (FL) (6–1)	Miami (FL) (7–1)	Miami (FL) (7–1)	Miami (FL) (7–1)	Indiana (6–1)	Georgia (7–2)	Georgia (7–2)	Iowa State (9–3)	9.
10.	Notre Dame		Texas A&M (0–0)	Ohio State (0–0) (2)	Penn State (0–0)	Oklahoma State (3–0)	Cincinnati (3–0)	Cincinnati (3–0)	BYU (6–0)	Miami (FL) (5–1)	Indiana (3–0)	Indiana (4–0)	Georgia (5–2)	Georgia (6–2)	Georgia (6–2)	Oklahoma (7–2)	Florida (8–3)	Northwestern (7–2)	10.
11.	Auburn		North Carolina (1–0)	Texas A&M (0–0)	North Carolina (1–0)	Cincinnati (3–0)	Texas A&M (2–1)	Miami (FL) (4–1) т	Wisconsin (1–0)	Wisconsin (1–0)	Georgia (4–2)	Georgia (4–2)	Oregon (3–0)	Indiana (5–1)	Iowa State (8–2)	Florida (8–2)	Coastal Carolina (11–0)	BYU (11–1)	11.
12.	Wisconsin		Oklahoma State (0–0)	North Carolina (1–0)	UCF (2–0)	Tennessee (2–0)	Miami (FL) (3–1)	BYU (5–0) т	Miami (FL) (5–1)	Oklahoma State (4–1)	Oregon (1–0)	Wisconsin (2–0)	Indiana (4–1)	Iowa State (7–2)	Oklahoma (7–2)	Coastal Carolina (11–0)	Iowa State (8–3)	Florida (8–4)	12.
13.	Texas A&M		UCF (0–0)	Penn State (0–0)	Texas A&M (1–0)	Auburn (1–1)	BYU (4–0)	North Carolina (3–1)	North Carolina (4–1)	Indiana (2–0)	Oklahoma State (5–1)	Oregon (2–0)	Northwestern (5–0)	Oklahoma (6–2)	Coastal Carolina (10–0)	USC (5–0)	Northwestern (6–2)	Indiana (6–2)	13.
14.	Texas		Cincinnati (0–0)	Miami (FL) (2–0)	Mississippi State (1–0)	Wisconsin (0–0)	Auburn (2–1)	Wisconsin (0–0)	Michigan (1–0)	Oregon (0–0)	Wisconsin (1–0)	Oklahoma State (5–1)	Oklahoma (6–2)	Coastal Carolina (9–0)	Northwestern (5–1)	Northwestern (6–1)	North Carolina (8–3)	Coastal Carolina (11–1)	14.
15.	Michigan		Memphis (1–0)	UCF (1–0)	Cincinnati (2–0)	BYU (3–0)	Wisconsin (0–0)	Oregon (0–0)	Oregon (0–0)	Marshall (5–0)	Marshall (6–0)	Marshall (7–0)	Iowa State (6–2)	Marshall (7–0)	USC (3–0)	North Carolina (8–3)	BYU (10–1)	Iowa (6–2)	15.
16.	Oklahoma State		Louisville (1–0)	Cincinnati (1–0)	Oklahoma (1–1)	LSU (1–1)	Oregon (0–0)	SMU (5–0)	Kansas State (4–1)	Coastal Carolina (6–0)	Iowa State (5–2)	Iowa State (5–2)	Marshall (7–0)	USC (3–0)	BYU (9–1)	BYU (10–1)	Iowa (6–2)	Louisiana (10–1)	16.
17.	USC		Tennessee (0–0)	Wisconsin (0–0)	LSU (0–1)	Oregon (0–0)	Tennessee (2–1)	Michigan (0–0)	Penn State (0–1)	Iowa State (4–2)	Coastal Carolina (7–0)	Oklahoma (5–2)	Coastal Carolina (8–0)	Northwestern (5–1)	Louisiana (9–1)	Iowa (6–2)	Louisiana (9–1)	North Carolina (8–4)	17.
18.	Minnesota		Miami (FL) (1–0)	Oklahoma State (1–0)	Wisconsin (0–0)	Virginia Tech (2–0)	SMU (4–0)	Iowa State (3–1)	Marshall (5–0)	SMU (6–1)	Oklahoma (5–2)	Coastal Carolina (7–0)	USC (3–0)	Oklahoma State (6–2)	Iowa (5–2)	Louisiana (9–1)	Miami (FL) (8–2)	Liberty (10–1)	18.
19.	North Carolina		Virginia Tech (0–0)	Michigan (0–0)	Oklahoma State (2–0)	Michigan (0–0)	Michigan (0–0)	Kansas State (3–1)	Indiana (1–0)	Oklahoma (4–2)	SMU (7–1)	USC (2–0)	Auburn (5–2)	Wisconsin (2–1)	Tulsa (6–1)	Miami (FL) (8–2)	USC (5–1)	Oklahoma State (8–3)	19.
20.	Utah		Kentucky (0–0)	Memphis (1–0)	Tennessee (1–0)	Texas A&M (1–1)	Iowa State (3–1)	Virginia Tech (3–1)	USC (0–0)	USC (0–0)	USC (1–0)	Northwestern (4–0)	Wisconsin (2–1)	Oregon (3–1)	North Carolina (7–3)	Tulsa (6–1)	San Jose State (7–0)	Texas (7–3)	20.
21.	UCF		Louisiana (1–0)	Tennessee (0–0)	Michigan (0–0)	SMU (4–0)	Louisiana (3–0)	Minnesota (0–0)	Coastal Carolina (5–0)	Auburn (4–2)	Auburn (4–2)	Auburn (4–2)	Texas (5–2)	Louisiana (8–1)	Liberty (9–1)	Liberty (9–1)	Oklahoma State (7–3)	USC (5–1)	21.
22.	Cincinnati		BYU (1–0)	Minnesota (0–0)	BYU (2–0)	Texas (2–1)	Kansas State (3–1)	NC State (4–1)	Iowa State (3–2)	Army (6–1)	Liberty (7–0)	Liberty (8–0)	Oklahoma State (5–2)	Tulsa (5–1)	Colorado (4–0)	Oklahoma State (7–3)	NC State (8–3)	Miami (FL) (8–3)	22.
23.	Iowa		Appalachian State (1–0)	BYU (1–0)	Virginia Tech (1–0)	Louisiana (3–0)	Virginia Tech (2–1)	USC (0–0)	SMU (5–1)	Boise State (2–0)	Northwestern (3–0)	Texas (5–2)	North Carolina (6–2)	Washington (3–0)	Texas (6–3)	NC State (8–3)	Liberty (9–1)	Ball State (7–1)	23.
24.	Virginia Tech		Baylor (0–0)	Virginia Tech (0–0)	Memphis (1–0)	Iowa State (2–1)	USC (0–0)	Coastal Carolina (4–0)	Oklahoma (3–2)	North Carolina (4–2)	Texas (5–2)	North Carolina (6–2)	Louisiana (7–1)	Iowa (4–2)	NC State (8–3)	Texas (6–3)	Texas (6–3)	San Jose State (7–1)	24.
25.	Iowa State		Army (2–0)	Louisiana (2–0)	Pittsburgh (3–0)	UCF (2–1)	Minnesota (0–0)	Marshall (4–0)	Army (6–1)	Michigan (1–1)	Army (6–1)	Louisiana (7–1)	Tulsa (5–1)	Liberty (9–1)	Wisconsin (2–2)	San Jose State (6–0)	Tulsa (6–2)	Buffalo (6–1)	25.
	Preseason Aug 6	Week 1 N/A (Note: No Rankings were announced, the top 25 rankings from the preseason remained the same.)	Week 2 Sep 13	Week 3 Sep 20	Week 4 Sep 27	Week 5 Oct 4	Week 6 Oct 11	Week 7 Oct 18	Week 8 Oct 25	Week 9 Nov 1	Week 10 Nov 8	Week 11 Nov 15	Week 12 Nov 22	Week 13 Nov 29	Week 14 Dec 6	Week 15 Dec 13	Week 16 Dec 20	Week 17 (Final) Jan 12	
		None	Dropped: Ohio State; Penn State; Oregon; Wisconsin; Michigan; USC; Minnesota; Utah; Iowa; Iowa State	Dropped: Louisville; Kentucky; Appalachian State; Baylor; Army	Dropped: Minnesota; Louisiana	Dropped: Mississippi State; Oklahoma; Memphis; Pittsburgh	Dropped: LSU; Texas; UCF	Dropped: Auburn; Tennessee; Louisiana	Dropped: Virginia Tech; Minnesota; NC State	Dropped: Kansas State; Penn State	Dropped: Boise State; North Carolina; Michigan	Dropped: SMU; Army	Dropped: Liberty	Dropped: Auburn; Texas; North Carolina	Dropped: Marshall; Oklahoma State; Oregon; Washington	Dropped: Colorado; Wisconsin	None	Dropped: NC State; Tulsa	

== CFP rankings ==
The initial 2020 College Football Playoff rankings were released on Tuesday, November 24, 2020.

	Week 12 Nov 24	Week 13 Dec 1	Week 14 Dec 8	Week 15 Dec 15	Week 16 (Final) Dec 20	
1.	Alabama (7–0)	Alabama (8–0)	Alabama (9–0)	Alabama (10–0)	Alabama (11–0)	1.
2.	Notre Dame (8–0)	Notre Dame (9–0)	Notre Dame (10–0)	Notre Dame (10–0)	Clemson (10–1)	2.
3.	Clemson (7–1)	Clemson (8–1)	Clemson (9–1)	Clemson (9–1)	Ohio State (6–0)	3.
4.	Ohio State (4–0)	Ohio State (4–0)	Ohio State (5–0)	Ohio State (5–0)	Notre Dame (10–1)	4.
5.	Texas A&M (5–1)	Texas A&M (6–1)	Texas A&M (7–1)	Texas A&M (7–1)	Texas A&M (8–1)	5.
6.	Florida (6–1)	Florida (7–1)	Florida (8–1)	Iowa State (8–2)	Oklahoma (8–2)	6.
7.	Cincinnati (8–0)	Cincinnati (8–0)	Iowa State (8–2)	Florida (8–2)	Florida (8–3)	7.
8.	Northwestern (5–0)	Georgia (6–2)	Cincinnati (8–0)	Georgia (7–2)	Cincinnati (9–0)	8.
9.	Georgia (5–2)	Iowa State (7–2)	Georgia (6–2)	Cincinnati (8–0)	Georgia (7–2)	9.
10.	Miami (FL) (7–1)	Miami (FL) (7–1)	Miami (FL) (8–1)	Oklahoma (7–2)	Iowa State (8–3)	10.
11.	Oklahoma (6–2)	Oklahoma (6–2)	Oklahoma (7–2)	Indiana (6–1)	Indiana (6–1)	11.
12.	Indiana (4–1)	Indiana (5–1)	Indiana (6–1)	Coastal Carolina (11–0)	Coastal Carolina (11–0)	12.
13.	Iowa State (6–2)	BYU (9–0)	Coastal Carolina (10–0)	USC (5–0)	North Carolina (8–3)	13.
14.	BYU (9–0)	Northwestern (5–1)	Northwestern (5–1)	Northwestern (6–1)	Northwestern (6–2)	14.
15.	Oregon (3–0)	Oklahoma State (6–2)	USC (4–0)	North Carolina (8–3)	Iowa (6–2)	15.
16.	Wisconsin (2–1)	Wisconsin (2–1)	Iowa (5–2)	Iowa (6–2)	BYU (10–1)	16.
17.	Texas (5–2)	North Carolina (6–3)	North Carolina (7–3)	BYU (10–1)	USC (5–1)	17.
18.	USC (3–0)	Coastal Carolina (9–0)	BYU (9–1)	Miami (FL) (8–2)	Miami (FL) (8–2)	18.
19.	North Carolina (6–2)	Iowa (4–2)	Louisiana (9–1)	Louisiana (9–1)	Louisiana (9–1)	19.
20.	Coastal Carolina (8–0)	USC (3–0)	Texas (6–3)	Texas (6–3)	Texas (6–3)	20.
21.	Marshall (7–0)	Marshall (7–0)	Colorado (4–0)	Oklahoma State (7–3)	Oklahoma State (7–3)	21.
22.	Auburn (5–2)	Washington (3–0)	Oklahoma State (6–3)	NC State (8–3)	San Jose State (7–0)	22.
23.	Oklahoma State (5–2)	Oregon (3–1)	NC State (8–3)	Tulsa (6–1)	NC State (8–3)	23.
24.	Iowa (3–2)	Tulsa (5–1)	Tulsa (6–1)	San Jose State (6–0)	Tulsa (6–2)	24.
25.	Tulsa (5–1)	Louisiana (8–1)	Missouri (5–3)	Colorado (4–1)	Oregon (4–2)	25.
	Week 12 Nov 24	Week 13 Dec 1	Week 14 Dec 8	Week 15 Dec 15	Week 16 (Final) Dec 20	
		Dropped: Texas; Auburn	Dropped: Wisconsin; Marshall; Washington; Oregon	Dropped: Missouri	Dropped: Colorado	

=== Criticism ===
In the Week 15 CFP rankings, the committee was widely criticized for dropping the Florida Gators only one spot from No. 6 to No. 7 following their home loss to a losing–record, unranked LSU Tigers team that was starting a freshman quarterback for the first time. Some also criticized the committee for undervaluing the undefeated Cincinnati Bearcats (dropped from No. 8 to No. 9 behind three two–loss teams) and for overvaluing the two–loss Iowa State Cyclones (rose from No. 7 to No. 6 despite two losses, including being defeated by the one-loss, No. 19-ranked Louisiana Ragin' Cajuns, 31–14).
