= Jeremiah Moon =

American football player (born 1998)

Profile
- Position: Linebacker

Personal information
- Born: August 18, 1998 (age 28); Hoover, Alabama, U.S.
- Listed height: 6 ft 5 in (1.96 m)
- Listed weight: 247 lb (112 kg)

Career information
- High school: Hoover
- College: Florida (2016–2021)
- NFL draft: 2022: undrafted

Career history
- Baltimore Ravens (2022–2023); Pittsburgh Steelers (2024); Carolina Panthers (2025); Pittsburgh Steelers (2025); Carolina Panthers (2026)

Career NFL statistics as of 2025
- Total tackles: 23
- Forced fumbles: 2
- Stats at Pro Football Reference

Jeremiah Moon (born August 18, 1998) is an American professional football linebacker. He played college football for the Florida Gators.

== Early life ==
Moon was born bowlegged and spent time wearing leg braces. He attended Hoover High School.

== College career ==
Moon played college football for the Florida Gators from 2016 to 2021. His freshman season was cut short after two games due to a season ending injury, leading him to redshirt for the rest of his season. After recovering, he started in five games in 2017 and 13 games in 2018. However, more injuries caused him to sit out for both the 2019 and 2020 season. Thanks to his three injury-shortended season and the extra year of eligibility, due to COVID-19, he returned for a sixth year in 2021.

== Professional career ==
Pre-draft measurables
Height	Weight	Arm length	Hand span	Wingspan	40-yard dash	10-yard split	20-yard split	20-yard shuttle	Three-cone drill	Vertical jump	Broad jump
6 ft 4 3/4 in (1.95 m)	249 lb (113 kg)	35 in (0.89 m)	10 1/8 in (0.26 m)	6 ft 11 5/8 in (2.12 m)	4.76 s	1.62 s	2.73 s	4.55 s	7.09 s	40.5 in (1.03 m)	11 ft 1 in (3.38 m)
All values from the NFL Combine

=== Baltimore Ravens ===
Moon went undrafted in the 2022 NFL draft. He eventually signed with the Baltimore Ravens as an undrafted free agent. Moon played in a few preseason games before being assigned to the practice squad for the 2022 season. He was signed to a future/reserve contract on January 17, 2023.

On August 29, 2023, Moon was waived by the Ravens and re-signed to the practice squad. He was promoted to the active roster on September 23. Moon was waived on October 26, and re-signed to the practice squad. He was signed to the active roster on January 5, 2024. Moon was waived by Baltimore on January 25.

=== Pittsburgh Steelers ===
On January 26, 2024, Moon was claimed off waivers by the Pittsburgh Steelers. He was placed on injured reserve on August 27. He was activated on October 5.

On March 28, 2025, Moon re-signed with the Steelers on a one-year contract. On July 29, 2025, Moon was waived with a calf injury. On August 1, he was released with an injury settlement.

=== Carolina Panthers ===
On October 21, 2025, Moon was signed to the Carolina Panthers' practice squad. He appeared in one game for the Panthers.

=== Pittsburgh Steelers (second stint) ===
On December 18, 2025, the Pittsburgh Steelers signed Moon off Carolina's practice squad.

=== Carolina Panthers (second stint) ===
On August 9, 2026, Moon signed with the Carolina Panthers. He was released by Carolina on August 30 as a part of final roster cuts. On September 9, Moon was re–signed to Carolina's practice squad. He was released on October 6.
