= Trevon Grimes =

American football player (born 1998)

Profile
- Position: Wide receiver

Personal information
- Born: November 28, 1998 (age 27); Fort Lauderdale, Florida, U.S.
- Listed height: 6 ft 4 in (1.93 m)
- Listed weight: 218 lb (99 kg)

Career information
- High school: St. Thomas Aquinas (Fort Lauderdale, Florida)
- College: Florida
- NFL draft: 2021: undrafted

Career history
- Philadelphia Eagles (2021)*
- * Offseason or practice squad member only
- Stats at Pro Football Reference

Trevon Grimes (born November 28, 1998) is an American former football wide receiver. He played college football for the Florida Gators.

== Early life ==
Grimes grew up in Fort Lauderdale, Florida and attended St. Thomas Aquinas High School, where he played football and ran track. Over the course of his high school career he had 42 receptions for 770 yards and 11 touchdowns and was a two time state champion in the 300 meter hurdles.

== College career ==
Grimes began his collegiate career at Ohio State. He played in two games as a freshman and caught three passes for 20 yards. He left the program in December and announced his intention to transfer, ultimately committing to Florida.

In his first year at Florida, Grimes caught 26 passes for 364 yards and two touchdowns. As a junior, Grimes had 33 catches for 491 yards and three touchdowns.

In his senior season, Grimes opted out of the 2020 Cotton Bowl Classic, in order to prepare for the 2021 NFL draft.

== Professional career ==
Pre-draft measurables
Height	Weight	Arm length	Hand span	40-yard dash	10-yard split	20-yard split	20-yard shuttle	Three-cone drill	Vertical jump	Broad jump	Bench press
6 ft 4 in (1.93 m)	220 lb (100 kg)	31 3/8 in (0.80 m)	9 3/8 in (0.24 m)	4.50 s	1.57 s	2.63 s	4.26 s	7.00 s	35.0 in (0.89 m)	9 ft 10 in (3.00 m)	15 reps
All values from Pro Day

Grimes signed with the Philadelphia Eagles as an undrafted free agent on May 14, 2021. He was waived/injured on June 9, and reverted to the injured reserve list the next day. He was waived from injured reserve with an injury settlement on June 21, 2021.
