= 2020 Georgia Bulldogs football team =

American college football season

2020 Georgia Bulldogs football

Peach Bowl champion

Peach Bowl, W 24–21 vs. Cincinnati
- Conference: Southeastern Conference
- Eastern Division

Ranking
- Coaches: No. 7
- AP: No. 7
- Record: 8–2 (7–2 SEC)
- Head coach: Kirby Smart (5th season)
- Offensive coordinator: Todd Monken (1st season)
- Offensive scheme: Pro spread
- Defensive coordinator: Dan Lanning (2nd season)
- Co-defensive coordinator: Glenn Schumann (2nd season)
- Base defense: 3–4
- Home stadium: Sanford Stadium

Uniform
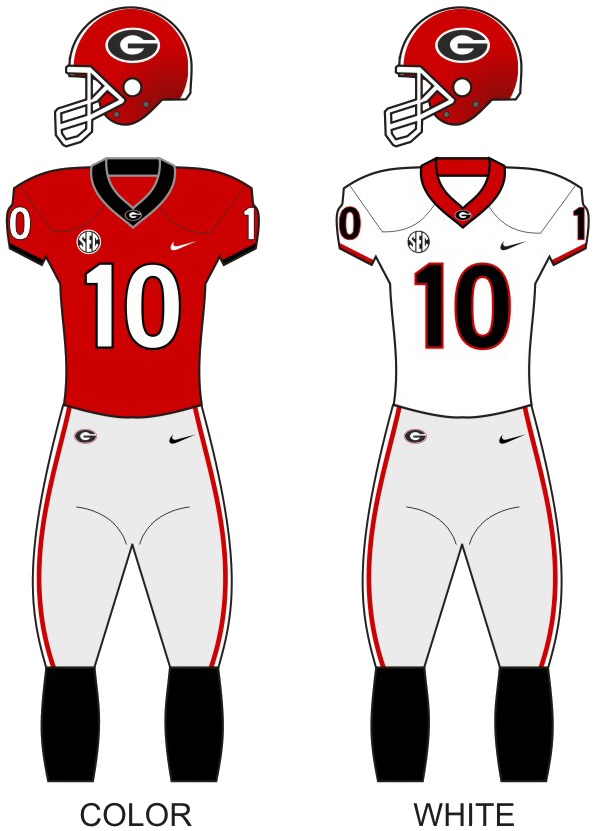

2020 Southeastern Conference football standings
	Conf.			Overall
Team	W		L	W		L
Eastern Division
No. 13 Florida x	8	–	2	8	–	4
No. 7 Georgia	7	–	2	8	–	2
Missouri	5	–	5	5	–	5
Kentucky	4	–	6	5	–	6
Tennessee*	3	–	7	3	–	7
South Carolina	2	–	8	2	–	8
Vanderbilt	0	–	9	0	–	9
Western Division
No. 1 Alabama x$#^	10	–	0	13	–	0
No. 4 Texas A&M	8	–	1	9	–	1
Auburn	6	–	4	6	–	5
LSU*	5	–	5	5	–	5
Ole Miss	4	–	5	5	–	5
Arkansas	3	–	7	3	–	7
Mississippi State	3	–	7	4	–	7
Championship: Alabama 52, Florida 46
# – College Football Playoff champion; ^ – College Football Playoff participant; $ – Conference champion; x – Division champion/co-champions; * – Tennessee vacated all wins due to NCAA violations. LSU was ineligible for postseason due to self imposed ban. Note: Due to COVID-19, the SEC played a conference-only schedule.; Rankings from AP Poll.

The 2020 Georgia Bulldogs football team represented the University of Georgia in the 2020 NCAA Division I FBS football season. The Bulldogs played their home games at Sanford Stadium in Athens, Georgia and were led by fifth-year head coach Kirby Smart. For the first time since 2016, the Bulldogs did not win the Eastern Division of the Southeastern Conference (SEC), finishing second behind rival Florida.

== Preseason ==
=== SEC Media Days ===
In the preseason media poll, Georgia was predicted to finish in second in the East Division behind Florida. Georgia received the second-most votes (tied with LSU) to win the SEC Championship Game.

=== Recruiting ===
Georgia's 2020 college football recruiting class was rated as the best in the country by Rivals.com, 247Sports, and On3. Highly-rated recruits included cornerback Kelee Ringo, defensive tackle Jalen Carter, offensive tackle Broderick Jones and Tate Ratledge, linebacker Mekhail Sherman, and tight end Darnell Washington.

== Schedule ==
Georgia announced its 2020 football schedule on August 7, 2019.

The Bulldogs had games scheduled against East Tennessee State, Georgia Tech, Louisiana–Monroe and Virginia, which were all canceled due to the COVID-19 pandemic. This was the first season since 1924 that the Bulldogs did not play Georgia Tech.

Georgia played two additional SEC West opponents this season: Arkansas and Mississippi State. The game scheduled against SEC East opponent Vanderbilt was postponed and eventually canceled.

Date	Time	Opponent	Rank	Site	TV	Result	Attendance
September 26	4:00 p.m.	at Arkansas	No. 4	Donald W. Reynolds Razorback Stadium; Fayetteville, AR	SECN	W 37–10	16,500
October 3	7:30 p.m.	No. 7 Auburn^{†}	No. 4	Sanford Stadium; Athens, GA (College GameDay / Deep South's Oldest Rivalry)	ESPN	W 27–6	20,524
October 10	3:30 p.m.	No. 14 Tennessee	No. 3	Sanford Stadium; Athens, GA (rivalry)	CBS	W 44–21	20,524
October 17	8:00 p.m.	at No. 2 Alabama	No. 3	Bryant–Denny Stadium; Tuscaloosa, AL (College GameDay / rivalry)	CBS	L 24–41	19,424
October 31	12:00 p.m.	at Kentucky	No. 5	Kroger Field; Lexington, KY	SECN	W 14–3	12,000
November 7	3:30 p.m.	vs. No. 8 Florida	No. 5	TIAA Bank Field; Jacksonville, FL (rivalry)	CBS	L 28–44	19,210
November 21	7:30 p.m.	Mississippi State	No. 13	Sanford Stadium; Athens, Georgia	SECN	W 31–24	20,524
November 28	7:30 p.m.	at South Carolina	No. 9	Williams–Brice Stadium; Columbia, SC (rivalry)	SECN	W 45–16	16,444
December 12	12:00 p.m.	at No. 25 Missouri	No. 9	Faurot Field; Columbia, MO	SECN	W 49–14	10,830
January 1	12:00 p.m.	vs. No. 8 Cincinnati*	No. 9	Mercedes-Benz Stadium; Atlanta, GA (Peach Bowl)	ESPN	W 24–21	15,301
*Non-conference game; ^{†}Homecoming; Rankings from AP Poll and CFP Rankings (after November 24) released prior to game; All times are in Eastern time

Schedule source:

== Roster ==
2020 Georgia Bulldogs football team roster
Players
Coaches
Offense

Pos.	#	Name	Class
TE	0	Darnell Washington	Fr
WR	1	George Pickens	So
RB	3	Zamir White	So
RB	4	James Cook	Jr
WR	5	Matt Landers	Jr
RB	6	Kenny McIntosh	So
WR	7	Jermaine Burton	Fr
WR	8	Dominick Blaylock	So
WR	10	Kearis Jackson	So
WR	11	Arian Smith	Fr
WR	12	Tommy Bush	So
QB	13	Stetson Bennett	Jr
WR	14	Trey Blount	Jr
QB	15	Carson Beck	Fr
WR	16	Demetris Robertson	Sr
WR	17	Justin Robinson	Fr
QB	18	JT Daniels	So
TE	18	Brett Seither	Fr
RB	20	Sevaughn Clark	Fr
RB	22	Kendall Milton	Fr
WR	23	Jaylen Johnson	So
QB	24	Nathan Priestley	Fr
QB	26	Jackson Muschamp	Fr
QB	27	Austin Kirksey	Fr
WR	31	Reid Tulowitzky	Jr
RB	33	Daijun Edwards	Fr
RB	36	Garrett Jones	So
WR	37	Patrick Bond	So
WR	38	Brady Tindall	Jr
RB	39	K. J. McCoy	Jr
TE	42	Mitchell Werntz	Jr
TE	43	Chase Harof	Jr
TE	44	Michael Hagerty	Fr
RB	45	Kirk Knisely	Fr
WR	46	George Vining	Fr
OL	50	Warren Ericson	So
OL	51	Tate Ratledge	Fr
OL	52	Cameron Kinnie	Fr
OL	54	Justin Shaffer	Sr
OL	55	Trey Hill	Jr
OL	57	Daniel Gothard	Sr
OL	58	Austin Blaske	Fr
OL	59	Broderick Jones	Fr
OL	60	Clay Webb	Fr
OL	61	Blake Watson	So
OL	63	Sedrick Van Pran-Granger	Fr
OL	64	David Vann	Fr
OL	66	Dalton Perry	Fr
OL	68	Chris Brown	Fr
OL	69	Jamaree Salyer	Jr
OL	70	Warren McClendon	Fr
OL	73	Xavier Truss	Fr
OL	74	Ben Cleveland	Sr
OL	75	Owen Condon	So
OL	76	Miles Johnson	Fr
OL	77	Devin Willock	Fr
OL	78	Chad Lindberg	Fr
OL	79	Weston Wallace	Fr
WR	81	Marcus Rosemy-Jacksaint	Fr
WR	83	Kaustov Chakrabarti	Fr
WR	84	Ladd McConkey	Fr
WR	85	Cameron Moore	Jr
TE	86	John FitzPatrick	So
TE	87	Tre' McKitty	GS
TE	88	Ryland Goede	Fr
WR	89	Braxton Hicks	Fr

Defense

Pos.	#	Name	Class
DB	2	Richard LeCounte	Sr
DB	3	Tyson Campbell	Jr
LB	4	Nolan Smith	So
DB	5	Kelee Ringo	Fr
DB	6	Jalen Kimber	Fr
DB	7	Tyrique Stevenson	So
OLB	8	M. J. Sherman	Fr
DB	9	Ameer Speed	Jr
DL	10	Malik Herring	Sr
LB	11	Jermaine Johnson II	Sr
LB	12	Rian Davis	Fr
OLB	13	Azeez Ojulari	So
DB	14	D. J. Daniel	Sr
ILB	15	Trezmen Marshall	So
DB	16	Lewis Cine	So
LB	17	Nakobe Dean	So
LB	19	Adam Anderson	Jr
DB	20	Major Burns	Fr
ILB	22	Nate McBride	Sr
DB	23	Mark Webb	Sr
DB	24	Prather Hudson	GS
LB	25	Quay Walker	Jr
DB	26	Daran Branch	Fr
DB	27	Eric Stokes	Jr
DB	29	Chris Smith II	Jr
LB	30	Tae Crowder	Sr
DB	31	William Poole	Jr
ILB	32	Monty Rice	Sr
OLB	33	Robert Beal Jr.	Jr
DB	36	Latavious Brini	Jr
DB	38	Patrick Taylor	Fr
DB	39	Hugh Nelson	So
ILB	41	Channing Tindall	Jr
LB	42	Matthew Brown	So
DB	43	Jehlen Cannady	Fr
DL	44	Travon Walker	So
DL	45	Bill Norton	Fr
DB	47	Dan Jackson	Fr
DL	54	Cade Brock	Fr
DL	78	Nazir Stackhouse	Fr
OLB	84	Walter Grant	Sr
DL	88	Jalen Carter	Fr
DL	90	Tramel Walthour	So
DL	91	Tymon Mitchell	Fr
DL	92	Julian Rochester	Sr
DL	95	Devonte Wyatt	Sr
DL	96	Zion Logue	Fr
DL	97	Warren Brinson	Fr
DL	99	Jordan Davis	Jr

Special teams

Pos.	#	Name	Class
LS	47	Payne Walker	So
LS	56	William Mote	Fr
K/P	90	Jake Camarda	Jr
P	93	Bill Rubright	Jr
P	95	Noah Chumley	Fr
K	96	Jack Podlesny	So
K	97	Brooks Buce	Jr
K	99	Jared Zirkel	Fr

Head coach

- Kirby Smart

Coordinators/assistant coaches

- Todd Monken – Offensive coordinator/quarterbacks
- Dan Lanning – Defensive coordinator/outside linebackers
- Glenn Schumann – Co-defensive coordinator/inside linebackers
- Scott Cochran – Special teams coordinator
- Dell McGee – Run game coordinator/running backs
- Cortez Hankton– Pass game coordinator/wide receivers
- Tray Scott – Defensive line
- Matt Luke – Offensive line/assistant head coach
- Todd Hartley – Tight ends
- Scott Sinclair – Director, strength and conditioning
- Rodney Prince – Assistant, strength and conditioning
- Maurice Sims – Assistant, strength and conditioning
- Ben Sowders – Assistant, strength and conditioning
- Tersoo Uhaa – Assistant, strength and conditioning
- Buster Faulkner – Quality control, offense
- Jacob Russell – Quality control, offense
- Duece Schwartz – Quality control, offense
- Montgomery VanGorder – Quality control, offense
- Luke Moore – Quality control, defense
- Roderick Ojong – Quality control, defense
- Dan O'Brien – Quality control, defense
- Matt Godwin – Player personnel coordinator
- Jay Chapman – Director of football management
- Anna Courson – Assistant, football operations
- Neyland Raper – Assistant, football operations
- Jonas Jennings – Director, player development
- Austin Chambers – Assistant director, player development
- Mike Cavan – Director of football administration
- Ann Hunt – Administrative associate to the head coach
- Christina Harris – Director, recruiting administration
- Katie Turner – Director, recruiting operations
- Angela Kirkpatrick – Assistant, recruiting
- Cameron Lemons – Assistant, recruiting
- Logen Reed – Assistant, recruiting
- Bryant Gantt – Director, player support and operations
- John Meshad – Director, player equipment
- Jake Stroot – Director, football technology
- Collier Madaleno – Director, football performance nutrition
- Meaghan Turcotte – Assistant director, football performance nutrition
- Greg Meyer – Special teams analyst
- Eric Black – Co-director, football creative design
- Chandler Eldridge – Co-director, football creative design
- Frank Martin – Co-director, football creative design

Legend

- (C) Team captain
- (S) Suspended
- (I) Ineligible
- Injured
- Redshirt

Roster
Last update: 9/1/21

== Rankings ==
Ranking movements Legend: ██ Increase in ranking ██ Decrease in ranking т = Tied with team above or below ( ) = First-place votes
	Week																	
Poll	Pre	1	2	3	4	5	6	7	8	9	10	11	12	13	14	15	16	Final
AP	4	4*	4	4	4	3	3 (1)	4	5	5	12	13	13	11	12	10	11	7
Coaches	4	4*	4	3T	4	3T	3	4	5	5	11	11	10	10	10	9	9	7
CFP	Not released												9	8	9	8	9	Not released

== Game summaries ==
=== At Arkansas ===
Game One – No. 4 Georgia Bulldogs (0–0) at Arkansas Razorbacks (0–0)

Quarter	1	2	3	4	Total
No. 4 Bulldogs	0	5	22	10	37
Razorbacks	7	0	3	0	10

at Donald W. Reynolds Razorback Stadium • Fayetteville, Arkansas

- Date: Saturday, September 26, 2020
- Game time: 3:00 p.m. CDT
- Game weather: Clear • Temperature: 80 °F (27 °C) • Wind: S 11 mph
- Game attendance: 16,500
- TV announcers (SEC Network): Dave Neal (play-by-play), D. J. Shockley (analyst) and Tera Talmadge (sideline)

Game information

First quarter

- (8:48) ARK – Treylon Burks 49 yard pass from Feleipe Franks, A.J. Reed kick (Drive: 7 plays, 91 yards, 2:17; Arkansas 7–0)

Second quarter

- (14:30) UGA – Arkansas fumble through the back of the end zone, safety (Arkansas 7–2)
- (0:00) UGA – Jack Podlesny 38 yard field goal (Drive: 8 plays, 59 yards, 1:00; Arkansas 7–5)

Third quarter

- (8:23) ARK – A.J. Reed 25 yard field goal (Drive: 11 plays, 43 yards, 4:15; Arkansas 10–5)
- (6:00) UGA – George Pickens 19 yard pass from Stetson Bennett, 2-point run good (Drive: 6 plays, 57 yards, 2:23; Georgia 13–10)
- (3:20) UGA – John FitzPatrick 7 yard pass from Stetson Bennett, Jack Podlesny kick (Drive: 4 plays, 24 yards, 1:11; Georgia 20–10)
- (2:53) UGA – Eric Stokes 30 yard interception return, Jack Podlesny kick (Georgia 27–10)

Fourth quarter

- (11:15) UGA – Zamir White 6 yard rush, Jack Podlesny kick (Drive: 13 plays, 81 yards, 5:38; Georgia 34–10)
- (1:23) UGA – Jack Podlesny 38 yard field goal (Drive: 6 plays, 22 yards, 2:36; Georgia 37–10)

Statistics	UGA	ARK
First downs	19	15
Plays–yards	89–387	67–280
Rushes–yards	42–121	28–77
Passing yards	266	203
Passing: comp–att–int	28–47–1	20–39–3
Time of possession	35:46	24:14

Team	Category	Player	Statistics
Georgia	Passing	Stetson Bennett	20/29, 211 yards, 2 TD
Georgia	Rushing	Zamir White	13 carries, 71 yards, 1 TD
Georgia	Receiving	Kearis Jackson	6 receptions, 62 yards
Arkansas	Passing	Feleipe Franks	19/36, 200 yards, 1 TD, 2 INT
Arkansas	Rushing	Trelon Smith	6 carries, 38 yards
Arkansas	Receiving	Treylon Burks	7 receptions, 102 yards, 1 TD

=== No. 7 Auburn ===
Game Two – No. 7 Auburn Tigers (1–0) at No. 4 Georgia Bulldogs (1–0)

Quarter	1	2	3	4	Total
No. 7 Tigers	0	3	3	0	6
No. 4 Bulldogs	10	14	3	0	27

at Sanford Stadium • Athens, Georgia

- Date: Saturday, October 3, 2020
- Game time: 6:38 p.m. CDT
- Game weather: Fair • Temperature: 64 °F (18 °C) • Wind: 5 mph E
- Game attendance: 20,524
- Referee: James Carter
- TV announcers (ESPN): Chris Fowler (play-by-play), Kirk Herbstreit (analyst), Allison Williams (sideline reporter)

Game information

First quarter

- (9:31) UGA – Zamir White 1 yd rush, Jack Podlesny kick (Drive: 10 plays, 43 yds, 2:56; Georgia 7–0)
- (4:00) UGA – Jack Podlesny 21 yd field goal (Drive: 11 plays, 59 yds, 3:56; Georgia 10–0)

Second quarter

- (11:08) UGA – George Pickens 21 yd pass from Stetson Bennett, Jack Podlesny kick (Drive: 11 plays, 84 yds, 5:26; Georgia 17–0)
- (6:26) UGA – Zamir White 1 yd rush, Jack Podlesny kick (Drive: 6 plays, 72 yds, 3:27; Georgia 24–0)
- (1:38) AUB – Anders Carlson 20 yd field goal (Drive: 12 plays, 65 yds, 4:40; Georgia 24–3)

Third quarter

- (10:09) AUB – Anders Carlson 45 yd field goal (Drive: 15 plays, 54 yds, 4:46; Georgia 24–6)
- (5:51) UGA – Jack Podlesny 25 yd field goal (Drive: 10 plays, 67 yds, 4:18; Georgia 27–6)

Fourth quarter

No scoring

Statistics	AUB	UGA
First downs	15	25
Plays–yards	63–216	73–442
Rushes–yards	22–39	45–202
Passing yards	177	240
Passing: comp–att–int	21–41–1	17–28–0
Time of possession	25:56	34:04

Team	Category	Player	Statistics
Auburn	Passing	Bo Nix	21/41, 177 yds, 1 INT
Auburn	Rushing	Tank Bigsby	8 carries, 31 yds
Auburn	Receiving	Anthony Schwartz	8 receptions, 57 yds
Georgia	Passing	Stetson Bennett	17/28, 240 yds, 1 TD
Georgia	Rushing	Zamir White	19 carries, 88 yds, 2 TD
Georgia	Receiving	Kearis Jackson	9 receptions, 147 yds

=== No. 14 Tennessee ===
Game Three – No. 14 Tennessee Volunteers (2–0) at No. 3 Georgia Bulldogs (2–0)

Quarter	1	2	3	4	Total
No. 14 Volunteers	7	14	0	0	21
No. 3 Bulldogs	7	10	13	14	44

at Sanford Stadium • Athens, Georgia

- Date: Saturday, October 10, 2020
- Game time: 2:30 p.m. EDT
- Game weather: Cloudy, 79 °F (26 °C)
- Game attendance: 20,524
- Referee: David Smith
- TV announcers (CBS): Brad Nessler (play-by-play), Gary Danielson (color), and Dawn Davenport (sidelines)

Game information

First quarter

- (14:17) UT - Kivon Bennett 0-yard Fumble Return (Brent Cimaglia Kick) (Drive: 2 plays, -25 yards, 0:43; Tennessee 7-0)
- (6:38) UGA - Zamir White 1-yard Run (Jack Podlesny Kick) (Drive: 5 plays, 63 yards, 2:29; Tied 7-7)

Second Quarter

- (11:42) UGA - Stetson Bennett 8-yard Run (Jack Podlesny Kick) (Drive: 12 plays, 95 yards, 6:15; Georgia 14-7)
- (6:40) UT - Josh Palmer 36-yard pass from Jarrett Guarantano (Brent Cimaglia Kick) (Drive: 1 play, 36 yards, 0:09; Tied 14-14)
- (4:49) UGA - Jack Podlesny 47-yard Field Goal (Drive: 5 plays, 46 yards, 1:51; Georgia 17-14)
- (3:08) UT - Josh Palmer 27-yard pass from Jarrett Guarantano (Brent Cimaglia Kick) (Drive: 6 plays, 67 yards, 1:41; Tennessee 21-17)

Third Quarter

- (12:00) UGA - Jack Podlesny 34-yard Field Goal (Drive: 4 plays, -1 yard, 2:13; Tennessee 21-20)
- (10:11) UGA - Jack Podlesny 51-yard Field Goal (Drive: 4 plays, 3 yards, 0:53; Georgia 23-21)
- (0:35) UGA - Kearis Jackson 21-yard pass from Stetson Bennett (Jack Podlesny Kick) (Drive: 8 plays, 62 yards, 3:53; Georgia 30-21)

Fourth Quarter

- (10:31) UGA - Jalen Carter 1-yard pass from Stetson Bennett (Jack Podlesny Kick) (Drive: 8 plays, 66 yards, 3:45; Georgia 37-21)
- (9:56) UGA - Monty Rice 20-yard Fumble Return (Jack Podlesny Kick) (Drive: 3 plays, -5 yards, 0:35; Georgia 44-21)

Statistics	TENN	UGA
First downs	13	24
Plays–yards	63-214	77-431
Rushes–yards	27-(-1)	50-193
Passing yards	215	238
Passing: comp–att–int	23-36-1	16-27-0
Time of possession	23:22	26:38

Team	Category	Player	Statistics
Tennessee	Passing	Jarrett Guarantano	23/36, 215 yds, 1 INT
Tennessee	Rushing	Eric Gray	8 carries, 25 yds
Tennessee	Receiving	Joshua Palmer	4 receptions, 71 yds
Georgia	Passing	Stetson Bennett	16/27, 238 yds, 2 TD
Georgia	Rushing	Kendall Milton	8 carries, 56 yds
Georgia	Receiving	Kearis Jackson	4 receptions, 91 yds, 1 TD

=== At No. 2 Alabama ===
Game Four – No 3. Georgia Bulldogs (3-0) at No. 2 Alabama Crimson Tide (3-0)

Quarter	1	2	3	4	Total
No. 3 Bulldogs	7	17	0	0	24
No. 2 Crimson Tide	7	13	14	7	41

at Bryant-Denny Stadium • Tuscaloosa, Alabama

- Date: Saturday, October 17, 2020
- Game time: 7:00 p.m. EDT
- Game weather: Clear skies • Temperature: 61 °F (16 °C) • Wind: ESE 4 mph
- Game attendance: 19,424
- Referee: Ken Williamson
- TV announcers (CBS): Brad Nessler (play-by-play), Gary Danielson (color) and Jamie Erdahl (sideline)

Game information

First quarter

- (13:16) UA - John Metchie III 40-yard pass from Mac Jones (Will Reichard Kick) (Drive: 3 plays, 58 yards, 0:52; Alabama 7-0)
- (1:53) UGA - Zamir White 10-yard Run (Jack Podlesny Kick) (Drive: 8 plays, 57 yards, 2:40; Tied 7-7)

Second Quarter

- (14:49) UGA - James Cook 82-yard pass from Stetson Bennett (Jack Podlesny Kick) (Drive: 2 plays, 86 yards, 0:13; Georgia 14-7)
- (9:00) UA - Will Reichard 33-yard Field Goal (Drive: 13 plays, 60 yards, 5:49; Georgia 14-10)
- (5:42) UGA - Jack Podlesny 50-yard Field Goal (Drive: 10 plays, 44 yards, 3:18; Georgia 17-10)
- (3:06) UA - DeVonta Smith 17-yard pass from Mac Jones (Will Reichard Kick) (Drive: 6 plays, 75 yards, 2:36; Tied 17-17)
- (0:23) UGA - Jermaine Burton 5-yard pass from Stetson Bennett (Jack Podlesny Kick) (Drive: 12 plays, 66 yards, 2:43; Georgia 24-17)
- (0:00) UA - Will Reichard 52-yard Field Goal (Drive: 5 plays, 41 yards, 0:23; Georgia 24-20)

Third Quarter

- (4:00) Jaylen Waddle 90-yard pass from Mac Jones (Will Reichard Kick) (Drive: 2 plays, 91 yards, 0:49; Alabama 27-24)
- (0:51) Najee Harris 2-yardd Run (Will Reichard Kick) (Drive: 5 plays, 56 yards, 1:58; Alabama 34-24)

Fourth Quarter

- (9:32) DeVonta Smith 13-yardd pass from Mac Jones (Will Reichard Kick) (Drive: 10 plays, 45 yards, 5:16, Alabama 41-24)

24 41

Statistics	UGA	ALA
First downs	20	33
Plays–yards	48-414	67-564
Rushes–yards	30-145	43-147
Passing yards	269	417
Passing: comp–att–int	18-40-3	24-33-1
Time of possession	26:01	33:59

Team	Category	Player	Statistics
Georgia	Passing	Stetson Bennett	18/40, 269 yds, 2 TD, 3 INT
Georgia	Rushing	Zamir White	10 carries, 57 yds, 1 TD
Georgia	Receiving	James Cook	4 receptions, 101 yds, 1 TD
Alabama	Passing	Mac Jones	24-32, 417 yds, 4 TD, 1 INT
Alabama	Rushing	Najee Harris	31 carries, 152 yds, 1 TD
Alabama	Receiving	DeVonta Smith	11 receptions, 167 yds, 2 TD

=== At Kentucky ===
Game Five – No 5. Georgia Bulldogs (3–1) at Kentucky Wildcats (2–3)

Quarter	1	2	3	4	Total
No. 5 Bulldogs	7	0	7	0	14
Wildcats	0	3	0	0	3

at Kroger Field • Lexington, Kentucky

- Date: Saturday, October 31, 2020
- Game time: 12:00 p.m. EDT
- Game weather: Mostly Sunny • Temperature: 54 °F (12 °C) • Wind: 5 SE mph
- Game attendance: 12,000
- Referee: Matt Loeffler
- TV announcers (SECN): Tom Hart (play-by-play), Jordan Rodgers (analyst) and Cole Cubelic (sideline)

Game information

First quarter

- (6:07) UGA - Stetson Bennett 2-yard Run (Jack Podlesny Kick) (Drive: 12 plays, 86 yards, 5:06; Georgia 7-0)

Second Quarter

- (2:44) UK - Matt Ruffolo 34-yard Field Goal (Drive: 19 plays, 77 yards, 10:28; Georgia 7-3)

Third Quarter

- (11:38) Zamir White 22-yard Run (Jack Podlesny Kick) (Drive: 7 plays, 75 yards, 3:22; Georgia 14-3)

Statistics	UGA	UK
First downs	20	15
Plays–yards	58-346	65-229
Rushes–yards	43-215	39-138
Passing yards	131	91
Passing: comp–att–int	9-14-2	15-25-0
Time of possession	25:00	35:00

Team	Category	Player	Statistics
Georgia	Passing	Stetson Bennett	9/13, 131 yds, 2 INT
Georgia	Rushing	Zamir White	26 carries, 136 yds, 1 TD
Georgia	Receiving	James Cook	4 receptions, 62 yds,
Kentucky	Passing	Joey Gatewood	15-25, 91 yds
Kentucky	Rushing	Chris Rodriguez	20 carries, 108 yds
Kentucky	Receiving	Josh Ali	5 receptions, 35 yds

=== Vs. No. 8 Florida ===
Game Six – No. 8 Florida Gators (3–1) vs. No. 5 Georgia Bulldogs (4–1)

Quarter	1	2	3	4	Total
No. 8 Florida	14	24	3	3	44
No. 5 Georgia	14	7	7	0	28

at TIAA Bank Field • Jacksonville, FL

- Date: November 7, 2020
- Game time: 3:30 p.m.
- Game weather: Temperature: 79 °F (26 °C) • Wind: ENE at 15 miles per hour (24 km/h) • Weather: Partly cloudy
- Game attendance: 19,210
- Referee: James Carter
- TV announcers (CBS): Brad Nessler, Gary Danielson, Jamie Erdahl
- Boxscore

Game information

First quarter

- Georgia – Zamir White 75-yard run (Jack Podlesny kick), 14:48
- Georgia – Marcus Rosemy-Jacksaint 32-yard pass from Stetson Bennett (Jack Podlesny kick), 11:44
- Florida – Justin Shorter 14-yard pass from Kyle Trask (Evan McPherson kick), 8:20
- Florida – Dameon Pierce 2-yard run (Evan McPherson kick), 1:43

Second quarter

- Georgia – Eric Stokes 37-yard interception return (Jack Podlesny kick), 12:17
- Florida – Kyle Pitts 25-yard pass from Kyle Trask (Evan McPherson kick), 11:38
- Florida – Kemore Gamble 24-yard pass from Kyle Trask (Evan McPherson kick), 7:44
- Florida – Evan McPherson 50-yard field goal, 1:44
- Florida – Trevon Grimes 14-yard pass from Kyle Trask (Evan McPherson kick), 0:11

Third quarter

- Florida – Evan McPherson 51-yard field goal, 11:48
- Georgia – Kearis Jackson 25-yard pass from D'Wan Mathis (Jack Podlesny kick), 0:41

Fourth quarter

- Florida – Evan McPherson 34-yard field goal, 1:19

Statistics	UGA	FLA
First downs	12	29
Plays–yards	58-277	80-577
Rushes–yards	29-165	37-97
Passing yards	112	474
Passing: comp–att–int	9-29-3	30-42-1
Time of possession	22:34	37:26

Team	Category	Player	Statistics
Georgia	Passing	Stetson Bennett	5/16, 78 yds, 1 TD, 1 INT
Georgia	Rushing	Zamir White	7 carries, 107 yds, 1 TD
Georgia	Receiving	Kearis Jackson	3 receptions, 48 yds, 1 TD
Florida	Passing	Kyle Trask	30-43, 474 yds, 4 TDs, 1 INT
Florida	Rushing	Dameon Pierce	15 carries, 52 yds, 1 TD
Florida	Receiving	Malik Davis	5 receptions, 100 yds, 1 TD

=== Mississippi State ===
	1	2	3	4	Total
Bulldogs	3	14	7	0	24
No. 13 Bulldogs	0	17	7	7	31

Statistics

Statistics	MSST	UGA
First downs	20	18
Total yards	358	409
Rushing yards	22	8
Passing yards	336	401
Turnovers	0	0
Time of possession	32:07	27:53

Team	Category	Player	Statistics
Mississippi State	Passing	Will Rogers	41–52, 336 yards, TD
Mississippi State	Rushing	Dillon Johnson	8 rushes, 19 yards, 2 TD
Mississippi State	Receiving	Jaden Walley	7 receptions, 115 yards, TD
Georgia	Passing	JT Daniels	28–38, 401 yards, 4 TD
Georgia	Rushing	Zamir White	11 rushes, 21 yards
Georgia	Receiving	Jermaine Burton	8 receptions, 197 yards, 2 TD

=== At South Carolina ===
Game Eight – No. 9 Georgia Bulldogs (5–2) at South Carolina Gamecocks (2–6)

Quarter	1	2	3	4	Total
No. 9 Bulldogs	21	7	10	7	45
Gamecocks	0	10	0	6	16

at Williams–Brice Stadium • Columbia, SC

- Date: November 28, 2020
- Game time: 7:30 p.m. EDT
- Game weather: • Temperature:
- Game attendance: 16,444
- TV: SECN

Game information

First Quarter

Second Quarter

Third Quarter

Fourth Quarter

Statistics	UGA	SC
First downs	24	16
Total yards	471	273
Rushes/yards	46/332	43/83
Passing yards	139	190
Passing: Comp–Att–Int	10-16-1	18-22-1
Time of possession	31:09	28:51

Team	Category	Player	Statistics
Georgia	Passing	JT Daniels	10-16, 139 yards, 2 TD, 1 INT
Georgia	Rushing	James Cook	6 carries, 104 yards, 2 TD
Georgia	Receiving	Tre' McKitty	2 receptions, 46 yards, 1 TD
South Carolina	Passing	Luke Doty	18-22, 190 yards, 1 TD, 1 INT
South Carolina	Rushing	Kevin Harris	17 carries, 53 yards, 1 TD
South Carolina	Receiving	Nick Muse	8 receptions, 131 yards, 1 TD

=== At No. 25 Missouri ===
	1	2	3	4	Total
No. 9 Georgia	14	7	21	7	49
No. 25 Missouri	0	14	0	0	14

=== Vs. No. 8 Cincinnati ===
No. 9 Georgia Bulldogs (7–2) vs. No. 8 Cincinnati Bearcats (9–0) (2021 Chick-fil-A Peach Bowl)

Quarter	1	2	3	4	Total
No. 9 Bulldogs	7	3	0	14	24
No. 8 Bearcats	7	7	7	0	21

at Mercedes-Benz Stadium • Atlanta, Georgia

- Date: Friday, January 1, 2021
- Game time: 12:00 p.m. EST
- Game weather: Temperature: 66 °F (19 °C) • Stadium Roof Closed
- Referee: Jeff Flanagan (ACC)
- TV announcers (ESPN): Mark Jones (play-by-play), Dusty Dvoracek (analyst), and Kris Budden (sideline)
- ESPN game summary

Game information

First quarter

- (4:38) CIN – Alec Pierce 14 yard pass from Desmond Ridder, Cole Smith kick (Drive: 7 plays, 42 yards, 3:45; Cincinnati 7–0)
- (0:29) UGA – George Pickens 16 yard pass from JT Daniels, Jack Podlesny kick (Drive: 5 plays, 44 yards, 2:07; Tied 7–7)

Second quarter

- (3:46) UGA – Jack Podlesny 38 yard field goal (Drive: 6 plays, 60 yards, 2:51; Georgia 10–7)
- (0:06) CIN – Josh Whyle 11 yard pass from Desmond Ridder, Cole Smith kick (Drive: 9 plays, 75 yards, 3:40; Cincinnati 14–10)

Third quarter

- (14:11) CIN – Jerome Ford 79 yard rush, Cole Smith kick (Drive: 2 plays, 75 yards, 0:49; Cincinnati 21–10)

Fourth quarter

- (13:20) UGA – Zamir White 9 yard rush, JT Daniels pass failed (Drive: 2 plays, 25 yards, 0:41; Cincinnati 21–16)
- (6:43) UGA – Jack Podlesny 32 yard field goal (Drive: 6 plays, 61 yards, 2:16; Cincinnati 21–19)
- (0:03) UGA – Jack Podlesny 53 yard field goal (Drive: 8 plays, 44 yards, 1:25; Georgia 22–21)
- (0:00) UGA – Azeez Ojulari tackled Desmond Ridder in the end zone for a safety (Georgia 24–21)

Statistics	UGA	CIN
First downs	19	16
Plays–yards	63–449	64–305
Rushes–yards	24–45	27–99
Passing yards	404	206
Passing: comp–att–int	27–39–1	24–37–0
Time of possession	28:36	31:24

Team	Category	Player	Statistics
Georgia	Passing	JT Daniels	26/38, 392 yards, 1 TD, 1 INT
Georgia	Rushing	Zamir White	11 carries, 41 yards, 1 TD
Georgia	Receiving	George Pickens	7 receptions, 135 yards, 1 TD
Cincinnati	Passing	Desmond Ridder	24/37, 206 yards, 2 TD
Cincinnati	Rushing	Jerome Ford	8 carries, 98 yards, 1 TD
Cincinnati	Receiving	Michael Young Jr.	4 receptions, 59 yards

== Players drafted into the NFL ==
Georgia had nine players selected in the 2021 NFL draft.

Round	Pick	Player	Position	NFL Club
1	29	Eric Stokes	CB	Green Bay Packers
2	33	Tyson Campbell	CB	Jacksonville Jaguars
2	50	Azeez Ojulari	OLB	New York Giants
3	92	Monty Rice	ILB	Tennessee Titans
3	94	Ben Cleveland	OG	Baltimore Ravens
3	97	Tre' McKitty	TE	Los Angeles Chargers
5	169	Richard LeCounte	S	Cleveland Browns
6	190	Trey Hill	C	Cincinnati Bengals

== Coaching staff ==
Name	Position	Consecutive season at Georgia in current position
Kirby Smart	Head coach	5th
Todd Monken	Offensive coordinator/Quarterbacks Coach	1st
Matt Luke	Associate head coach / Offensive line coach	1st
Scott Cochran	Special teams coordinator	1st
Dan Lanning	Defensive coordinator/Outside linebackers coach	2nd
Glenn Schumann	Co-defensive coordinator/Inside linebackers coach	2nd
Cortez Hankton	Pass Game coordinator/Wide receivers coach	3rd
Dell McGee	Run Game coordinator/Running backs coach	2nd
Todd Hartley	Tight ends coach	2nd
Tray Scott	Defensive line coach	4th
