= Old Clinch County Jail =

- Clinch County Jail
- U.S. National Register of Historic Places
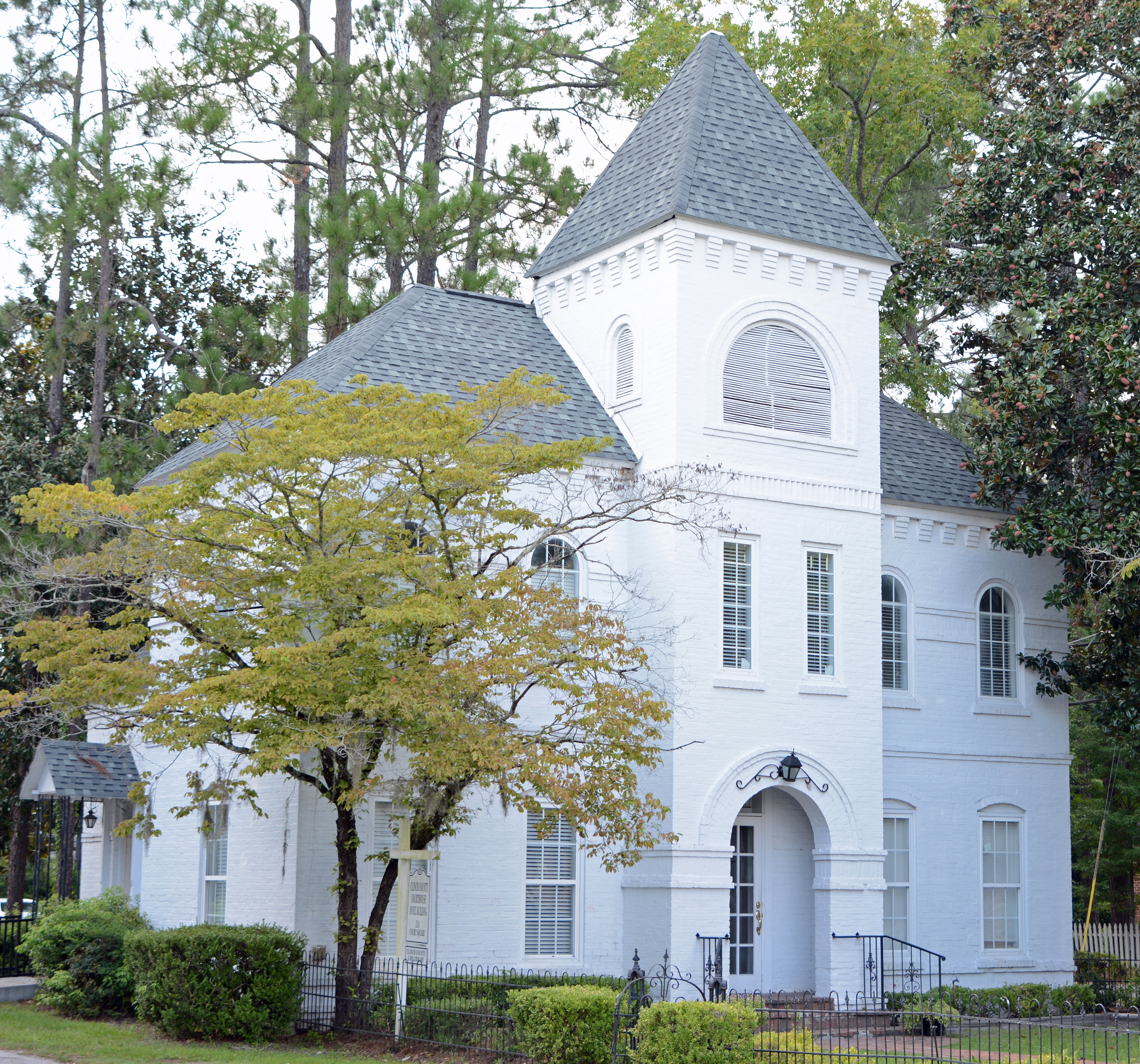

- Location within Georgia
- Location: Court Sq., Homerville, Georgia
- Coordinates: 31.03723°N 82.74875°W
- Area: less than one acre
- Built: 1893-94
- Built by: Manly Jail Works
- Architect: Thomas F. Lockwood
- NRHP reference No.: 80000994
- Added to NRHP: January 11, 1980

The Old Clinch County Jail is a historic jail in Homerville, Georgia, Clinch County, Georgia, located in Court Square. It is a two-story brick building 35 feet by 32 feet in size and was built in 1893. It was completed in 1894 at a cost of $3,175 and was the county's jail for 33 years, until 1927.

Some work was done on the building in 1936 as part of the Works Progress Administration. In 1927 the local Woman's Club saved the building from destruction and, as of 1979, they had a long-term lease.

It replaced the county's wooden jail that had been built in 1872.

It was added to the National Register of Historic Places on January 11, 1980.

The jail was deemed significant for its fireproof construction, designed by a Georgia architect with construction by Dalton, Georgia's Manly Iron Jail Works, a company that still existed in 1979. Thomas Firth Lockwood (1868-1920) of Columbus, Georgia was the architect.

== See also ==
- Clinch County Courthouse
- National Register of Historic Places listings in Clinch County, Georgia
