= 2020 college football recruiting class =

Recruiting of students for US college football

The college football recruiting class of 2020 refers to the recruiting of high school athletes to play college football starting in the fall of 2020. The scope of this article covers: (a) the colleges and universities with recruiting classes ranking among the top 20 in the country as assessed by at least one of the major media companies, and (b) the individual recruits ranking among the top 20 in the country as assessed by at least one of the major media companies.

Georgia, led by head coach Kirby Smart, had the top recruiting class according to Rivals.com, 247Sports, and On3. CBS Sports rated Alabama as the No. 1 class of 2020.

Defensive tackle Bryan Bresee was selected as the No. 1 recruit in the country by Rivals.com, USA Today, and 247Sports. Wide receiver Julian Fleming was selected by ESPN as the No. 1 recruit. Other notable players in the 2020 recruiting class included 2021 Heisman Trophy winner Bryce Young, who was rated as the No. 2 recruit by both Rivals.com and 247Sports.

== Top ranked classes ==
School	Rivals	247	CBS	On3
Georgia	1	1	4	1
Alabama	3	2	1	2
Clemson	2	3	5	3
LSU	4	4	3	4
Ohio State	5	5	2	5
Texas A&M	6	6	8	6
Auburn	10	7		7
Texas	14	8		9
Florida	7	9		8
Michigan	11	10		10
Tennessee	8	11		11
Oregon	9	12	6	12
Oklahoma	16	13	10	13
North Carolina	12	14		16
Penn State	15	15		14
Miami	13	17		17
Nebraska	17	20		20
South Carolina	18	19		19
Washington	19	16		15
Florida State	20	22		21
USC	71	NR	7	NR
Notre Dame	22	18	9	18

== Top ranked recruits ==
Player	Position	School	ESPN	Rivals	USA Today	247Sports
Bryan Bresee	Defensive tackle	Clemson	3	1	1	1
Julian Fleming	Wide receiver	Ohio State	1	14	5	3
Bryce Young	Quarterback	Alabama	5	2	11	2
Desmond Evans	Defensive end	North Carolina	2	77	13	6
Jordan Burch	Defensive end	South Carolina	4	17	2	8
Arik Gilbert	Tight end	LSU	6	9	15	5
Chris Braswell	Defensive end	Alabama	7	25	20	19
Kelee Ringo	Cornerback	Georgia	8	7	12	4
Broderick Jones	Offensive tackle	Georgia	9	5	NR	11
Justin Flowe	Linebacker	Oregon	10	8	4	6
DJ Uiagalelei	Quarterback	Clemson	43	3	3	10
Paris Johnson Jr.	Offensive tackle	Ohio State	11	21	10	9
Jalen Carter	Defensive tackle	Georgia	12	50	NR	18
Myles Murphy	Defensive end	Clemson	13	4	7	7
Noah Sewell	Linebacker	Oregon	27	10	25	13
Tate Ratledge	Offensive tackle	Georgia	74	12	22	38
Myles Hinton	Offensive tackle	Stanford	14	26	NR	
Eli Ricks	Cornerback	LSU	39	6	9	14
Michael Mayer	Tight end	Notre Dame	81	37	14	32
Sav'ell Smalls	Linebacker	Washington	15	49	8	30
Demond Demas	Wide receiver	Texas A&M	47	15	NR	25
Bijan Robinson	Running back	Texas	21	18	21	15
Zach Evans	Running back	TCU (Ole Miss transfer)	16	13	6	16
Gervon Dexter	Defensive tackle	Florida	17	23	NR	12
Will Anderson Jr.	Defensive end	Alabama	49	22		17
Mekhail Sherman	Linebacker	Georgia	18	40		33
Justin Rogers	Tackle	Kentucky	123	16	18	NR
Darnell Washington	Tight end	Georgia	19	33	16	23
Rakim Jarrett	Wide receiver	Maryland	22	19		27
C. J. Stroud	Quarterback	Ohio State	104	52	19	42
Tank Bigsby	Running back	Auburn	20	46		40
Jaxon Smith-Njigba	Wide receiver	Ohio State	91	20		29
Demarkcus Bowman	Running back	Clemson	23	27	17	20
