= Magnolia, Georgia =

Unincorporated community in Georgia, U.S.

Coordinates: 30°53′17.76″N 82°43′56.50″W

Magnolia is an unincorporated community in Clinch County, in the U.S. state of Georgia.

== History ==
An old variant name was "Polk". A post office called Polk was established in 1851, the name was changed to Magnolia in 1852, and the post office closed in 1861. The present name is after a grove of magnolia trees near the original town site.

The Georgia General Assembly incorporated Magnolia as a town in 1854; the town's municipal charter was repealed in 1995.

Magnolia once held the county seat, a courthouse having built at the site in 1852. The courthouse burned to the ground in 1856, at which time the county seat was transferred to Homerville.
