= Clinch County High School =

Public high school in Georgia, United States

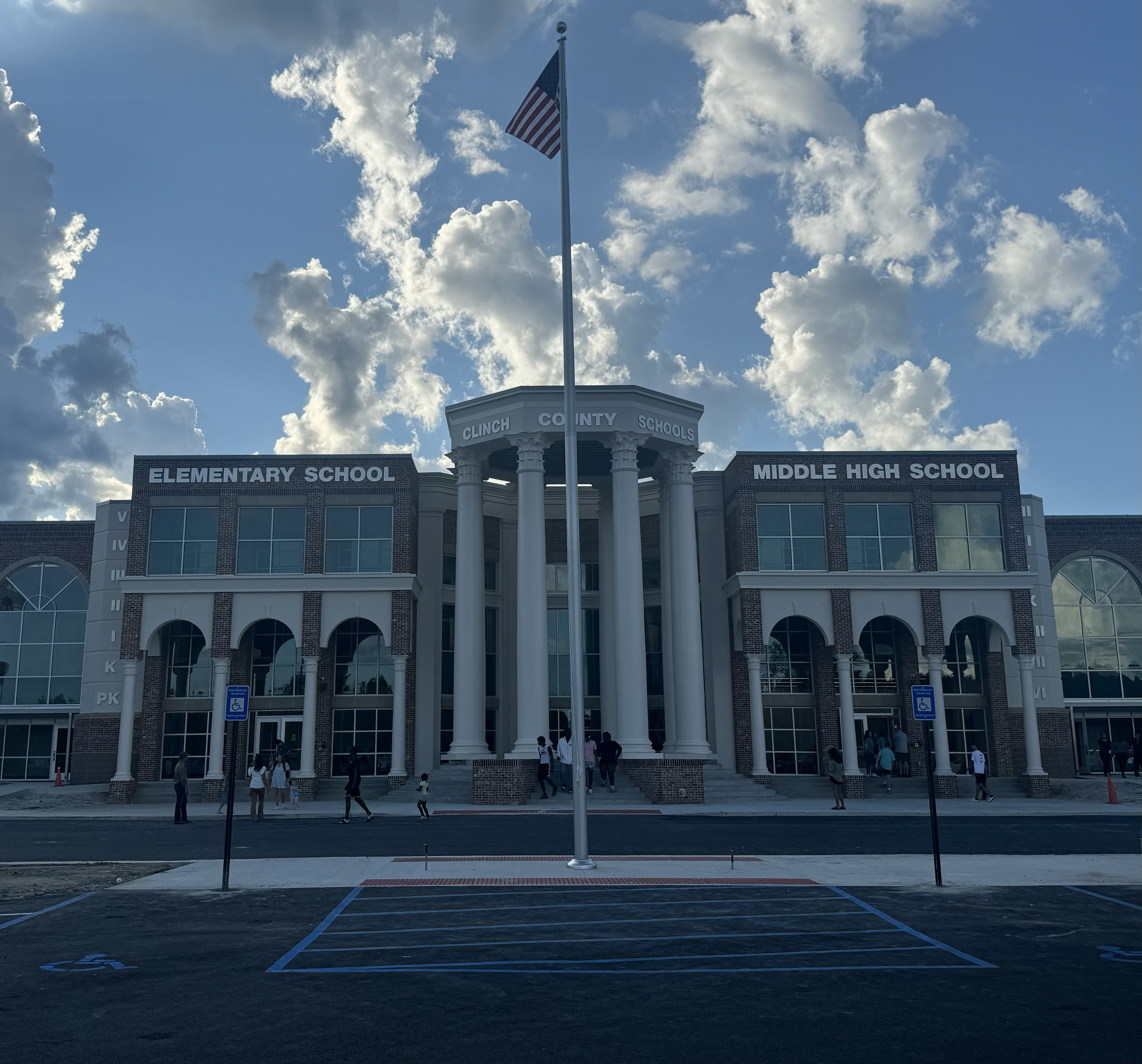

Location
- 1 Panther Way; Homerville, Georgia 31634; United States; 31°2′56″N 82°45′0″W

Information
- School type: Public high school
- Motto: “Failure is Not an Option”
- School board: Clinch County Board of Education
- School district: Clinch County School District
- Superintendent: Lori James
- Principal: Jerri Lynn Spivey
- Teaching staff: 27.30 (FTE)
- Grades: 9 – 12
- Gender: Co-ed
- Student to teacher ratio: 12.27
- Colors: Red and white
- Slogan: Roll Red Roll!
- Athletics conference: GHSA Class A - Region 2
- Mascot: Panther
- Team name: Clinch County Panthers
- Rival: Charlton County High School, Lanier County High School, Atkinson County High School
- Accreditation: Southern Association of Colleges and Schools
- Website: cchs.clinchcounty.com

Clinch County High School is a public high school located in unincorporated Clinch County, Georgia, United States, with a Homerville postal address. It is part of the Clinch County School District.

== Athletics ==
CCHS won the "Triple Crown" in the 1988–89 school year by winning state titles in football, boys' basketball, and baseball in one academic school year.

=== Football ===
CCHS has won eight state football championships (1988, 1991, 2002, 2004, 2010, 2015, 2017, 2018). The CCHS football team holds the high-school record for least yards rushing (117) allowed in a 15-game season. The teams’ wins in 2017 and 2018 gave the school its first back-to-back state football titles.

=== Baseball ===
CCHS has six state championships in baseball (1986, 1987, 1989, 1991, 1992, 2003).

=== Boys’ & Girls’ Basketball ===
The CCHS basketball teams have three state championships in boys' basketball (1987, 1989, 2026), and five state championships in girls' basketball (1976, 1987, 1991, 1993, 2023).

=== Other Sports ===
CCHS also competes in other sports including girls’ softball, girls’ volleyball, boys’ and girls’ track, and boys’ and girls’ tennis.

== Notable alumni ==
- Boris Lee - football player
- Trezmen Marshall - linebacker for the Alabama Crimson Tide
- Jonathan Smith - NFL player
- Tara Williams - American basketball player
