= National Register of Historic Places listings in Clinch County, Georgia =

This is a list of properties and districts in Clinch County, Georgia that are listed on the National Register of Historic Places (NRHP).

This National Park Service list is complete through NPS recent listings posted March 21, 2025.

== Current listings ==
	Name on the Register	Image	Date listed	Location	City or town	Description
1	Clinch County Courthouse	Clinch County Courthouse	September 18, 1980 (#80000993)	U.S. 84; 31°02′13″N 82°44′55″W	Homerville	Built in 1895
2	Clinch County Jail	Clinch County Jail	January 11, 1980 (#80000994)	Court Sq. 31°02′14″N 82°44′56″W	Homerville	Built in 1894
