= Clinch County Courthouse =

Historic courthouse in Georgia, US

- U.S. National Register of Historic Places
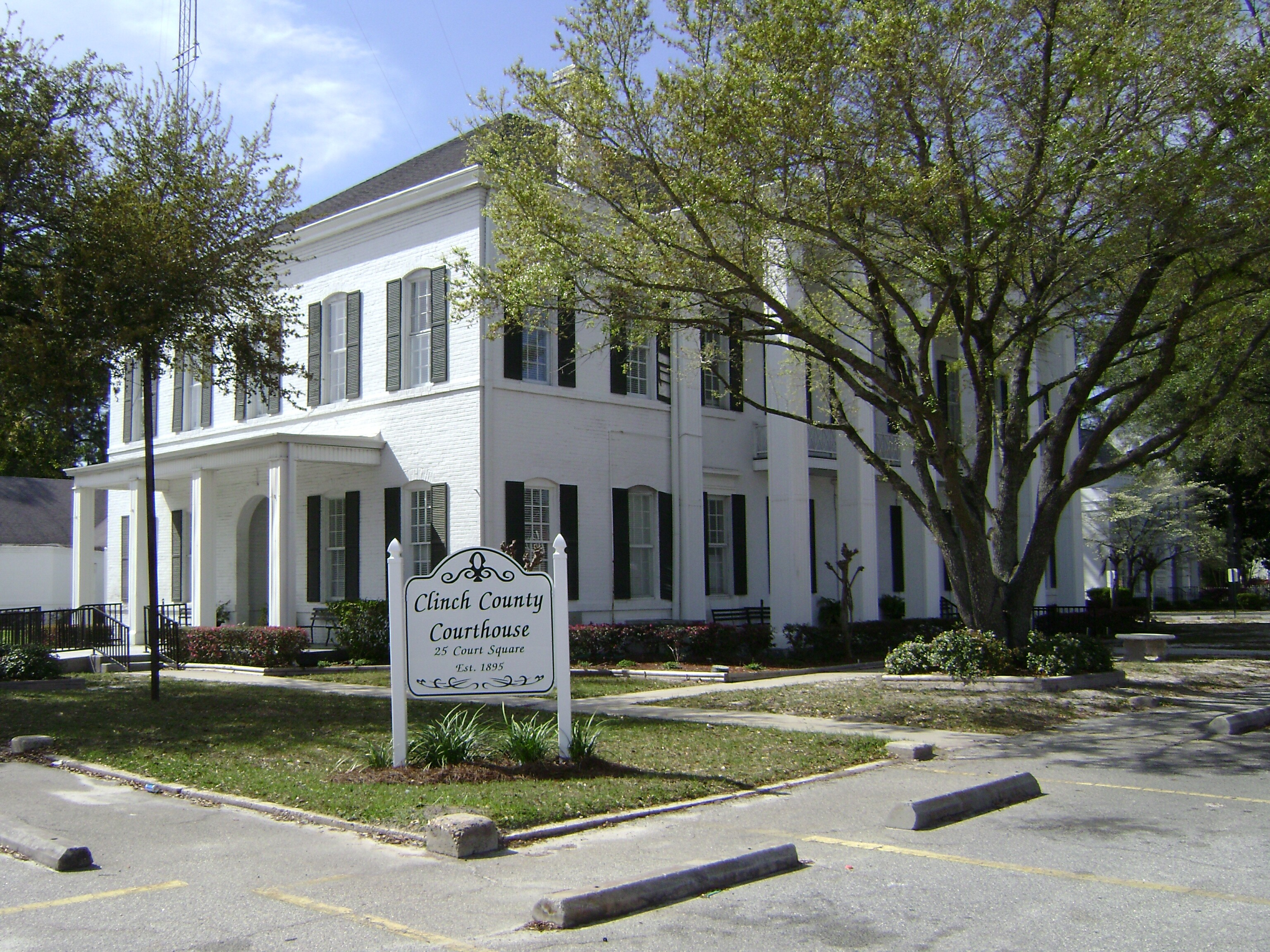

- Location within Georgia Location within the United States
- Interactive map showing the location of Clinch County Courthouse
- Location: 100 Court St; Homerville, GA 31634
- Coordinates: 31.03690°N 82.74854°W
- Built: 1896
- Architectural style: Victorian (original building); Neoclassical (1936 addition)
- NRHP reference No.: 80000993
- Added to NRHP: September 18, 1980

The Clinch County Courthouse is the county courthouse of Clinch County, Georgia, in the United States. Located in the county seat of Homerville, the building was built in 1896 and was added to the National Register of Historic Places in 1980. It is one of two National Register of Historic Places-listed sites in Clinch County, the other being the Old Clinch County Jail, which also was added to the Register in 1980.

The courthouse is designed in the Victorian functional style, with Classical Revival additions.

There is a historical marker at the intersection of Georgia State Route 37 and North Cemetery Road west of Homerville describing the first courthouse site from 1850, a private residence.

== History ==
Clinch County was created by an 1850 act of the Georgia General Assembly, from portions of Lowndes and Ware counties. The act established a commission of five members responsible for choosing a county seat and building a county courthouse and provided that until the courthouse of build, elections and court sessions be held at the home of Jonathan Knight.

In 1852, the first courthouse was built. It was destroyed by fire in 1856. A second courthouse was built in 1859, but this too burned in a fire, in 1867. The third and current courthouse was completed in 1896. A 1936 Works Progress Administration project rehabilitated the courthouse and added an addition.

== Photos ==
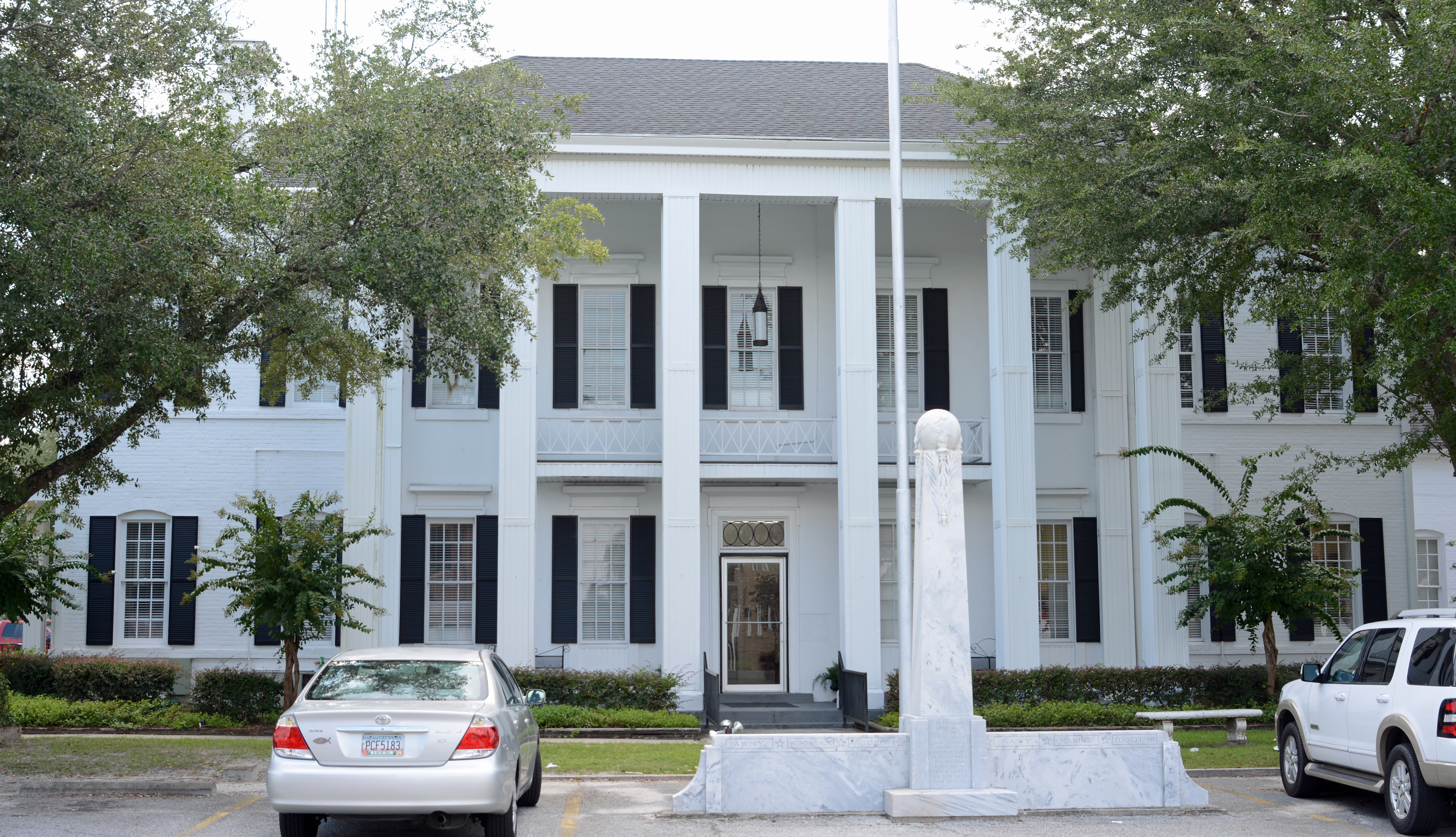
Courthouse in 2015

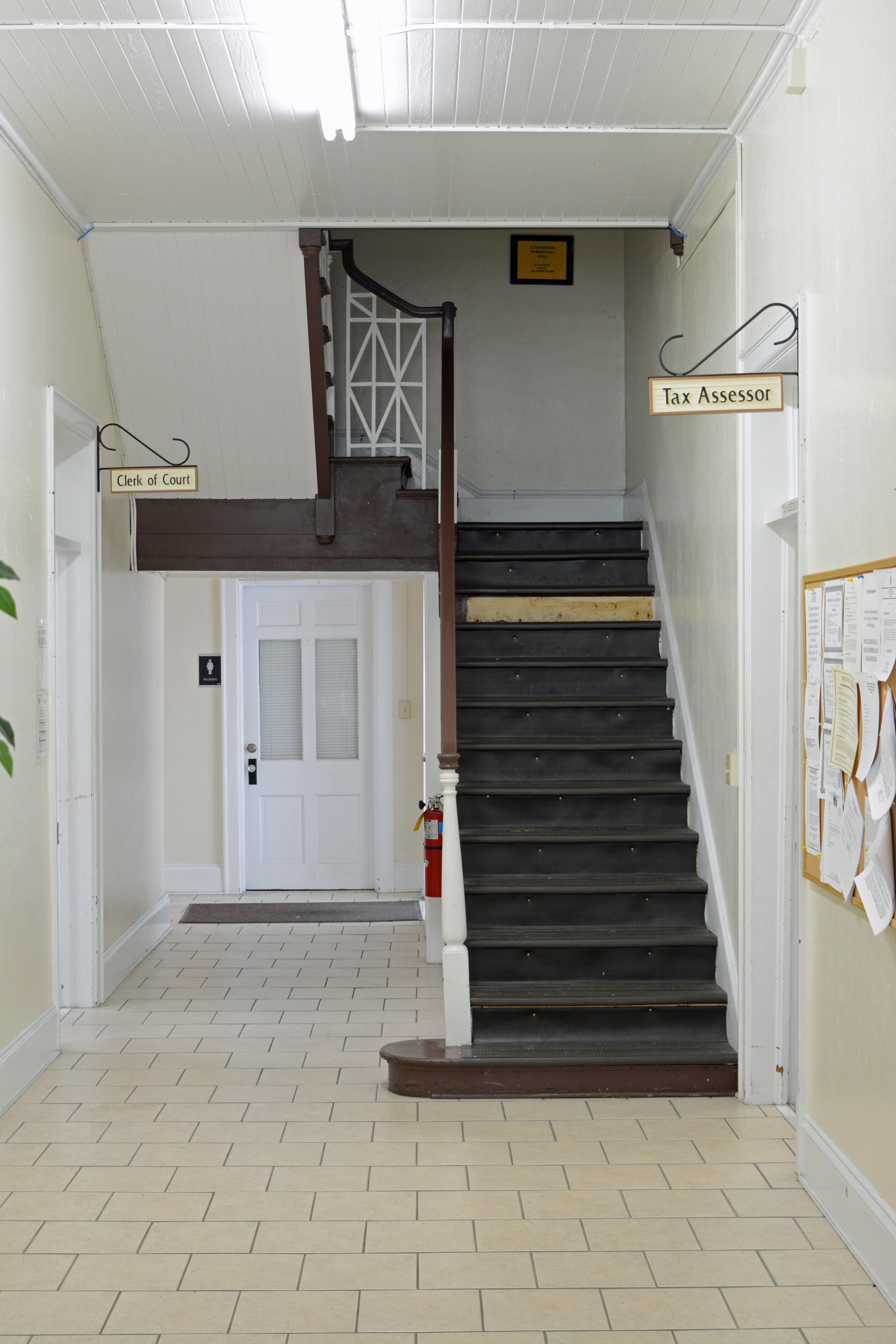
inside

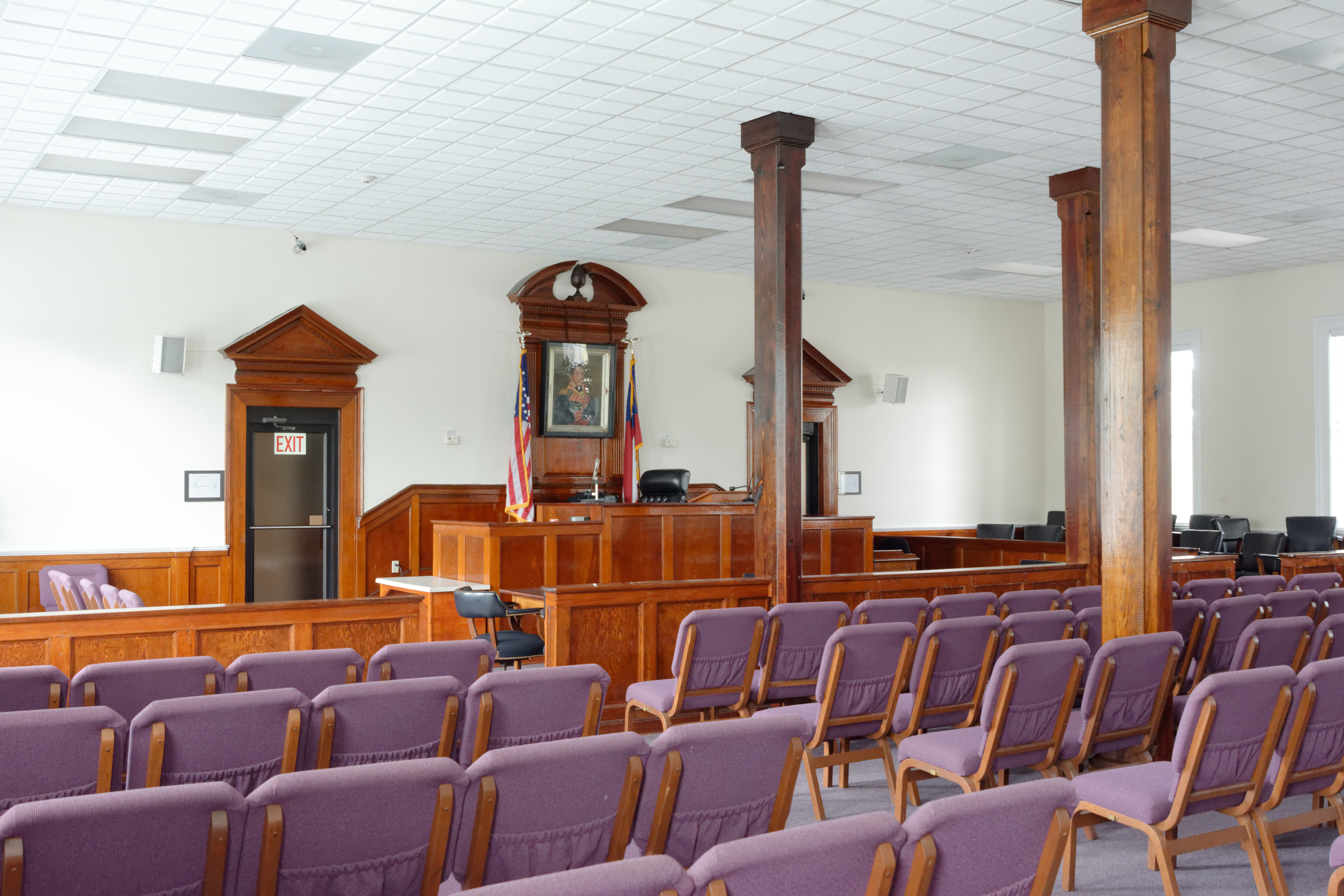
Courtroom

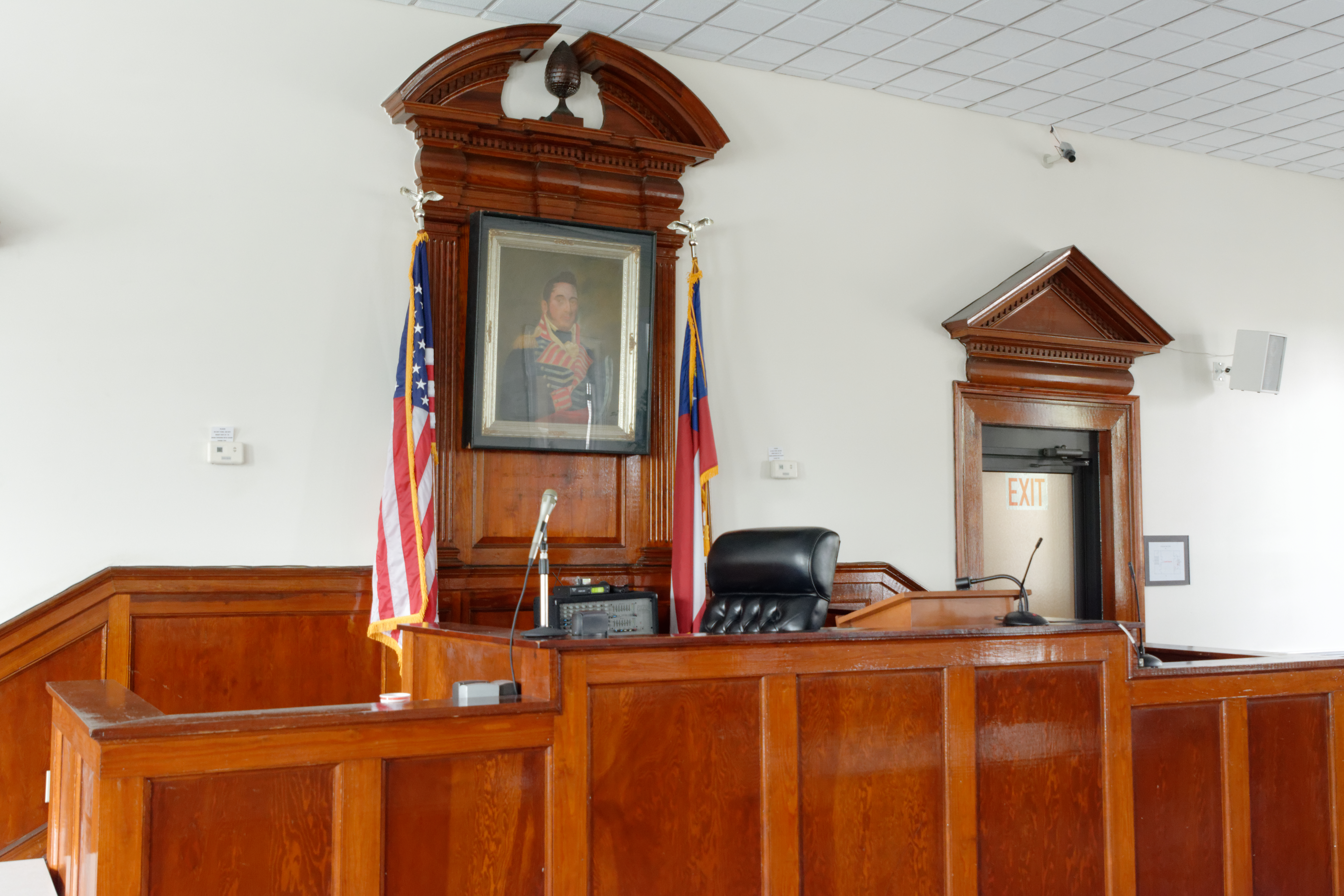
Bench

== See also ==
- Old Clinch County Jail
