= Clinch County School District =

School district in Georgia (U.S. state)

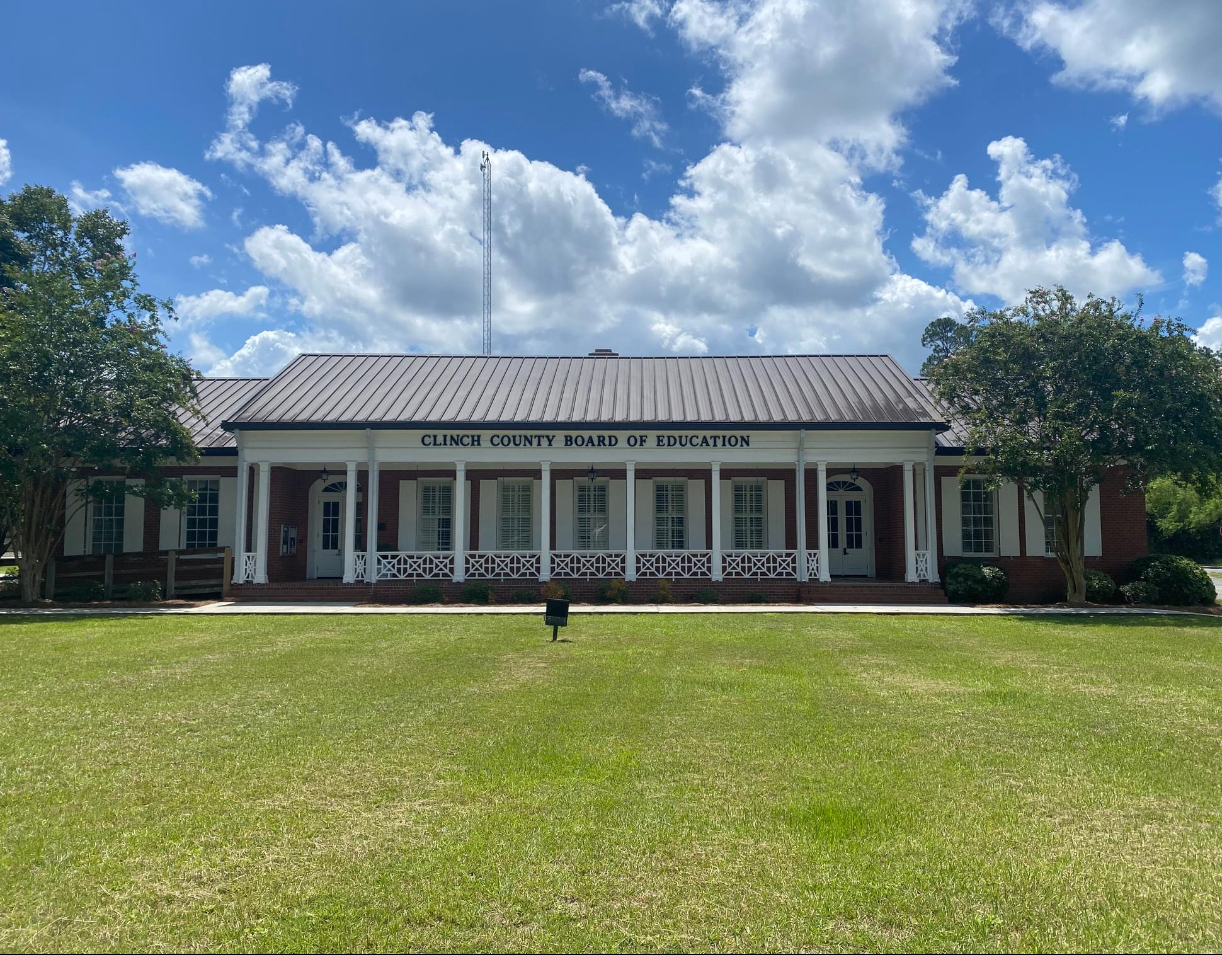

Address
- 46 S College Street Homerville, Clinch County, Georgia, 31634-3401; United States

District information
- Grades: Pre-school - 12
- Superintendent: Lori James
- Accreditations: Southern Association of Colleges and Schools; Georgia Accrediting Commission

Students and staff
- Enrollment: 1,251 (2022-2023)
- Faculty: 96

Other information
- Telephone: (912) 487-5321
- Fax: (912) 487-5068
- Website: www.clinchcounty.com

The Clinch County School District is a public school district in Clinch County, Georgia based in Homerville, Georgia. It serves the communities of Argyle, Du Pont, Fargo, and Homerville.

== Schools ==
The Clinch County School District recently has merged their Elementary school with their Middle/High school. Making it a K-12 school, and the only school in the county.

=== Clinch County Schools ===
- Clinch County Elementary School
- Clinch County Middle School
- Clinch County High School
