= Council, Georgia =

Unincorporated community in Georgia, U.S.

Coordinates: 30°36′51″N 82°30′39″W

Council is an unincorporated community in Clinch County, in the U.S. state of Georgia.

== History ==
A post office called Council was established in 1909, and remained in operation until 1958. The community was named after C. C. and John M. Council, proprietors of a local sawmill.
