= Trezmen Marshall =

American football player (born 2000)

Profile
- Position: Linebacker

Personal information
- Born: February 17, 2000 (age 26)

Career information
- High school: Clinch County (Homerville, Georgia)
- College: Georgia (2019–2022); Alabama (2023)
- NFL draft: 2024: undrafted

Career history
- Montreal Alouettes (2025)*
- * Offseason or practice squad member only

Awards and highlights
- 2× CFP national champion (2021, 2022)
- Stats at CFL.ca

Trezmen Marshall (born February 17, 2000) is an American professional football linebacker. He was most recently a member of the Montreal Alouettes of the Canadian Football League (CFL). He played college football for the Georgia Bulldogs and Alabama Crimson Tide.

== Early life ==
Marshall attended Clinch County High School in Homerville, Georgia. He was ranked as a four-star recruit and committed to play college football for the Georgia Bulldogs.

== College career ==
=== Georgia ===
As a freshman in 2019, Marshall notched five tackles in three games. In the 2020 COVID-19 shortened season, he appeared in ten games recording no statistics. In the 2021 season, Marshall played in four games recording seven tackles before suffering a season ending knee injury. In week 3 of the 2022 season, he notched four tackles and his first career interception against South Carolina. Marshall finished the 2022 season with 19 tackles with four and a half going for a loss, a sack, and an interception. After the season, Marshall entered the NCAA transfer portal.

Marshall finished his career for the Georgia Bulldogs with 30 tackles with four and a half being for a loss, a sack, a pass deflection, and an interception. He won the 2022 SEC Championship and two National Championships in 2021 and 2022.

=== Alabama ===
Marshall transferred to Alabama to finish out his collegiate career. In week 5 of the 2023 season, Marshall recorded nine tackles along with a sack and a half in a win versus Mississippi State. He won the SEC Championship Game with Alabama in 2023 against his former team and coach, the Georgia Bulldogs and head coach Kirby Smart, with the score of 27–24. Marshall and 4th ranked Alabama ended their season with an 27–20 overtime loss to Michigan in the CFP.

== Professional career ==
Pre-draft measurables
Height	Weight	Arm length	Hand span	40-yard dash	10-yard split	20-yard split	20-yard shuttle	Three-cone drill	Vertical jump	Broad jump	Bench press
6 ft 0 1/2 in (1.84 m)	225 lb (102 kg)	30 5/8 in (0.78 m)	9 in (0.23 m)	4.77 s	1.61 s	2.81 s	4.46 s	7.26 s	28.5 in (0.72 m)	9 ft 6 in (2.90 m)	18 reps
All values from Pro Day

Marshall went undrafted in the 2024 NFL draft. He signed with the Montreal Alouettes on December 2, 2024. However, he was part of the final cuts on May 31, 2025.
