= Edith, Georgia =

- Unincorporated community
- Location within the state of Georgia Edith, Georgia (the United States)
- Coordinates: 30°40′43″N 82°33′04″W
- Country: United States
- State: Georgia
- County: Clinch
- Elevation: 115 ft (35 m)
- Time zone: UTC-5 (Eastern (EST))
  - Summer (DST): UTC-4 (EDT)
- Area code: 912
- GNIS ID: 331636

Edith is an unincorporated community in Clinch County, Georgia, United States.
