= Glenn Schumann =

American football coach (born 1990)

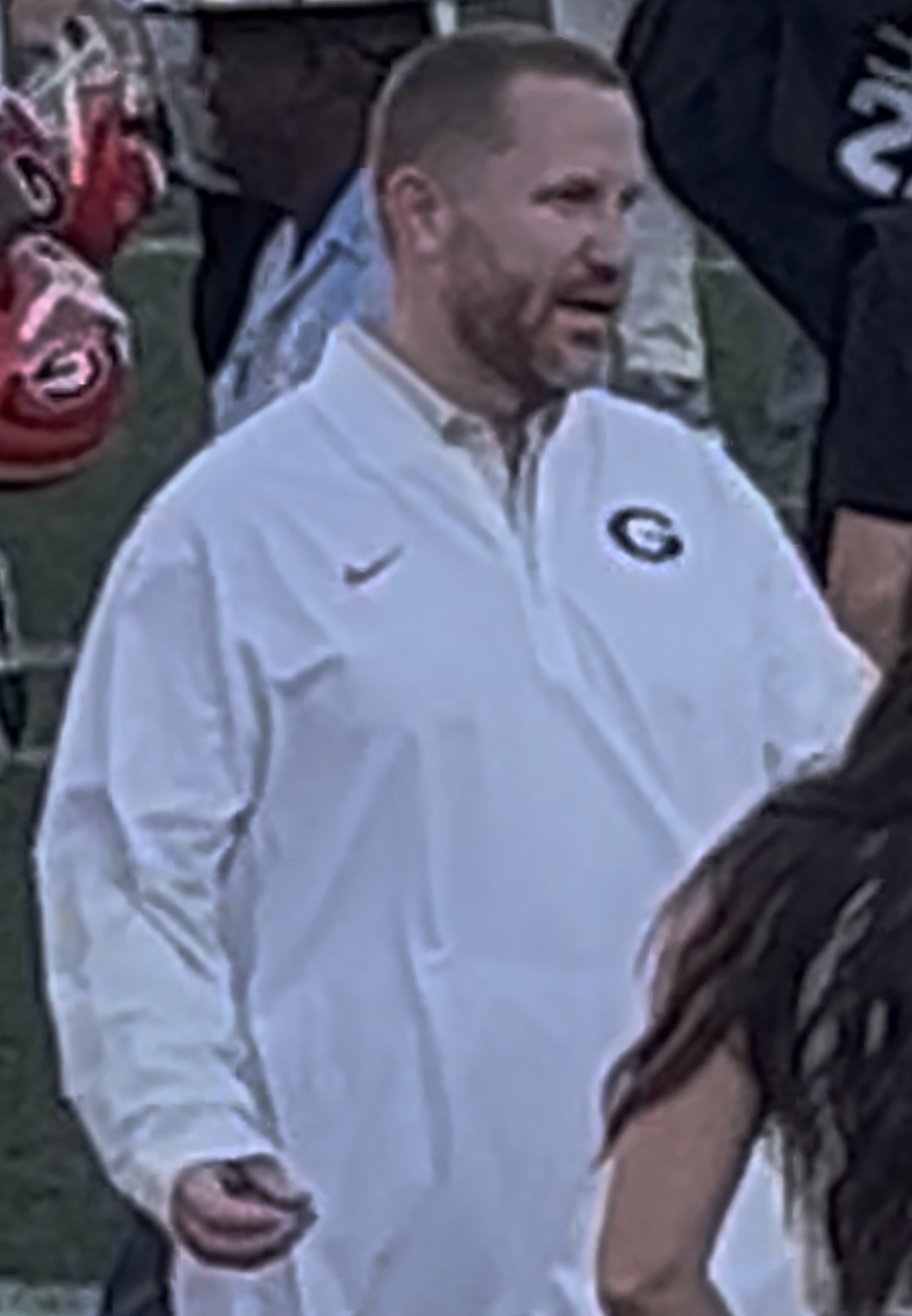
- Schumann in 2025

Current position
- Title: Defensive coordinator
- Team: Georgia
- Conference: SEC

Biographical details
- Born: March 29, 1990 (age 36); Valdosta, Georgia, U.S.
- Education: Alabama (2011)

Coaching career (HC unless noted)
- 2008–2011: Alabama (SA)
- 2011–2014: Alabama (GA)
- 2016–2018: Georgia (ILB)
- 2019–2023: Georgia (co-DC/ILB)
- 2024–present: Georgia (DC/ILB)

Administrative career (AD unless noted)
- 2014–2015: Alabama (Director of football operations)

Accomplishments and honors

Championships
- Assistant, administrator, coach, or coordinator for National Champions in 2009, 2011, 2012, 2015, 2021, 2022; Assistant, administrator, coach, or coordinator for SEC Championships in 2009, 2012, 2014, 2015, 2017, 2022, 2024, 2025

Glenn Schumann (born March 29, 1990) is an American college football coach who is currently the defensive coordinator for the Georgia Bulldogs.

== Early life ==
Schumann was born on March 29, 1990, in Valdosta, Georgia to Eric Schumann, a former college football coach and player, and Sherry Schumann, a college athletic director. During his childhood, he moved all over the country because of his father's coaching stops, living in Georgia, Tennessee, Louisiana and Texas. He played both football and basketball at McKinney Boyd High School in McKinney, Texas, where he lettered in both sports. He was part of McKinney Boyd's first ever graduating class.

== Coaching career ==
=== Alabama ===
Unlike most collegiate coaches, Schumann did not play college football. Instead, after graduating high school in Texas, Schumann enrolled at Alabama, his father's alma mater, to be a student assistant under legendary coach Nick Saban in 2008. Reflecting on his time as a student assistant, he said that being a student assistant was, “doing anything that was asked of me.” He graduated from Alabama in 2011 with a Bachelor of Arts degree and earned a Master's Degree in sports management in 2013.

He served as a student assistant from 2008 to 2011, when he graduated. During his time as a student assistant, Alabama won one SEC Championship and one National Championship. After he graduated, he became a graduate assistant under Saban. During his time as an on-field assistant, he worked closely with Saban and defensive coordinator Kirby Smart in installing the defensive gameplan every week. He worked with the outside linebackers during the early part of his stint and switched to working with the secondary for the latter part of his tenure as graduate assistant.

In 2014, he became the director of football operations. His responsibilities at this position included off-the-field activities, player development, helping student-athletes balance athletics and academics, and organizing recruiting efforts.

=== Georgia ===
When Kirby Smart was hired away from Alabama to become the head coach at Georgia, he made Schumann his first coaching hire. Speaking about the relationship between Smart and Schumann at Alabama, Smart said Schumann “was my right-hand for four or five years over there.” He was hired as the inside linebackers coach there. This hire also made him the youngest on-field coaching assistant in the SEC. When Roquan Smith, an inside linebacker for Georgia at the time, asked Alabama players about Schumann, the Alabama players, “were talking about how much of a guru he was,” Smith said. “Then when I met him and was watching film with him, I was like, ‘Wow, this guy is really that.’”

Schumann coached the aforementioned Smith to winning the Butkus Award, which goes to the nation's best linebacker in 2017. Also in 2017, Georgia won their first SEC Championship since 2005 and advanced to the National Championship, only to lose to his former boss, Nick Saban, and Alabama.

Prior to the 2019 season, defensive coordinator Mel Tucker left to become the head coach at Colorado, so Smart promoted Schumann and outside linebackers coach Dan Lanning to co-defensive coordinators. Georgia's defense in 2019 had the best team defense in the nation, allowing only 12.6 points per game and 276 yards per game. He was part of the Bulldogs' coaching staff that won the National Championship over Alabama in the 2021 season. He won his second championship with Georgia, and sixth overall, when they defeated TCU in the National Championship.

In February 2023, Schumann interviewed for the Philadelphia Eagles' defensive coordinator job. He ultimately decided to remain at Georgia.

== Personal life ==
Schumann and his wife Lauren were married in 2015. They have three children.
