= Broderick Jones =

American football player (born 2001)

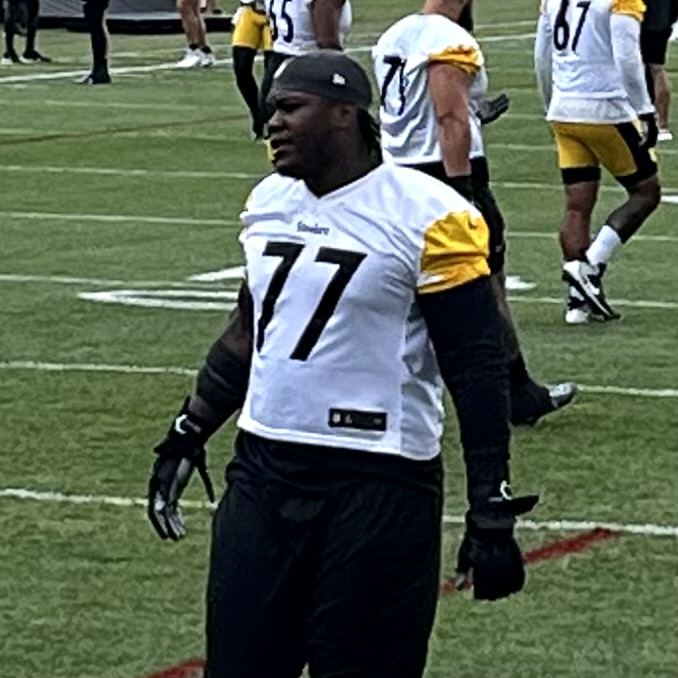
- Jones with the Pittsburgh Steelers in 2023

No. 77 – Dallas Cowboys
- Position: Offensive tackle
- Roster status: Active

Personal information
- Born: May 16, 2001 (age 25); Lithonia, Georgia, U.S.
- Listed height: 6 ft 5 in (1.96 m)
- Listed weight: 311 lb (141 kg)

Career information
- High school: Lithonia (Stonecrest, Georgia)
- College: Georgia (2020–2022)
- NFL draft: 2023: 1st round, 14th overall pick

Career history
- Pittsburgh Steelers (2023–2025); Dallas Cowboys (2026–present)

Awards and highlights
- 2× CFP national champion (2021, 2022); First-team All-SEC (2022)

Career NFL statistics as of Week 10, 2026
- Games played: 55
- Games started: 39
- Stats at Pro Football Reference

Broderick Bernard Jones (born May 16, 2001) is an American professional football offensive tackle for the Dallas Cowboys of the National Football League (NFL). He played college football for the Georgia Bulldogs, winning the CFP national championship twice before being selected by the Pittsburgh Steelers in the first round of the 2023 NFL draft.

== Early life ==
Jones attended Lithonia High School in Stonecrest, Georgia. He received his first athletic scholarship offer while he was a ninth grade high school student from Alabama. As a senior, he was considered one of the best offensive lineman in the class of 2020 and was a part of the Under Armour All-American Game. A five star recruit, Jones committed to play college football at the University of Georgia.

== College career ==
As a freshman in 2020, Jones was a redshirt player. In 2021, his production increased and he made four starts in relief for Jamaree Salyer, who was injured. He was named to the 2021 SEC All-Freshman Team.

== Professional career ==
Pre-draft measurables
Height	Weight	Arm length	Hand span	Wingspan	40-yard dash	10-yard split	20-yard split	Vertical jump	Broad jump
6 ft 5 3/8 in (1.97 m)	311 lb (141 kg)	34 3/4 in (0.88 m)	10 5/8 in (0.27 m)	6 ft 10 3/4 in (2.10 m)	4.97 s	1.74 s	2.82 s	30.0 in (0.76 m)	9 ft 0 in (2.74 m)
All values from the NFL Combine

=== Pittsburgh Steelers ===
==== 2023 season ====
The Pittsburgh Steelers selected Jones in the first round with the 14th overall pick in the 2023 NFL draft. On October 8, 2023, Jones made his first career start against the Baltimore Ravens in week 5. In his first start, he was able to record 37 pass block reps against the Ravens defense, allowing no sacks and only allowing one pressure. In week 9 against the Tennessee Titans, Jones relieved Chukwuma Okorafor at right tackle. He remained the starter for the rest of the 2023 season. He finished the season starting in 11 games, playing in all 17. Jones made his first postseason appearance in the Steelers' 17–31 loss to the Buffalo Bills during the AFC Wild Card round.

==== 2024 season ====
Prior to the 2024 season, Jones was named the team's starting right tackle. He made his first start in the Steelers' week 1 victory over the Atlanta Falcons. During week 2 against the Denver Broncos, Jones struggled with multiple penalties, committing three in the span of six plays. All three penalties were costly for the Steelers as one negated a 51-yard pass from Justin Fields to George Pickens. After the third penalty, Jones was benched in favor of Troy Fautanu for the remainder of the game. When Fautanu was injured during a practice prior to week 3's win over the Los Angeles Chargers, Jones was reinstated as the starter. Fautanu was placed on the injured reserve list the following week, permanently placing Jones in the starting position for the remainder of the season.

Jones would have one of the best games of his career thus far during week 10's 28–27 Steelers win over the Washington Commanders. Earning a PFF grade of 74.0, he allowed no pressures, sacks, quarterback hurries or hits on snaps in which he was on the line. He finished the season appearing in all 17 games, starting 16 of them as the Steelers finished 10–7, giving Jones a second consecutive playoff berth. Jones made his final appearance of the season in the Steelers' 28–14 loss to the Baltimore Ravens.

==== 2025 season ====
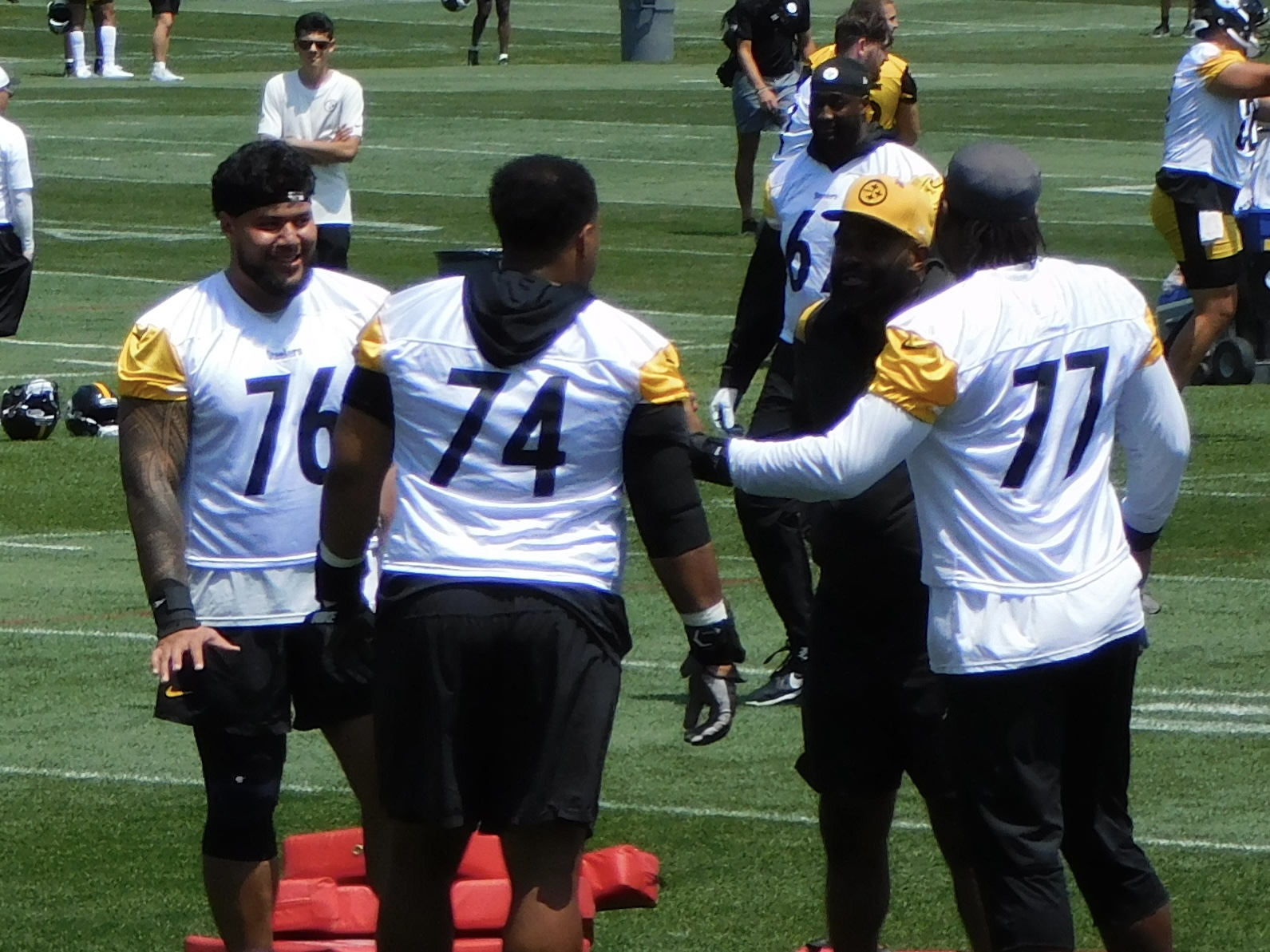
Jones (77) during a Steelers practice in 2025

In the 2025 offseason, it was revealed Jones was to start the regular season as the team's starting left tackle.

Jones faced criticism for his performances through the beginning of the season. In Week 1 against the New York Jets, Jones gave up three sacks on quarterback Aaron Rodgers. However, he would rebound and continue to improve, allowing only 3 sacks total from Week 2 to Week 10. On November 29, 2025, Jones was placed on injured reserve after suffering a neck injury in Week 12 against the Chicago Bears. The next day, it was announced that he would miss the remainder of the season due to the injury. On April 30, 2026, the Steelers declined the fifth-year option of Jones' contract making him a free agent following the 2026 season.

=== Dallas Cowboys ===
==== 2026 season ====
On August 29, 2026, Jones, along with a 2027 fourth-round pick, was traded to the Dallas Cowboys in exchange for 2027 third- and sixth-round picks.

== Personal life ==
Jones wears the number 77 in honor of former Georgia teammate Devin Willock, who died in a car crash in January 2023.
