= Azeez Ojulari =

American football player (born 2000)

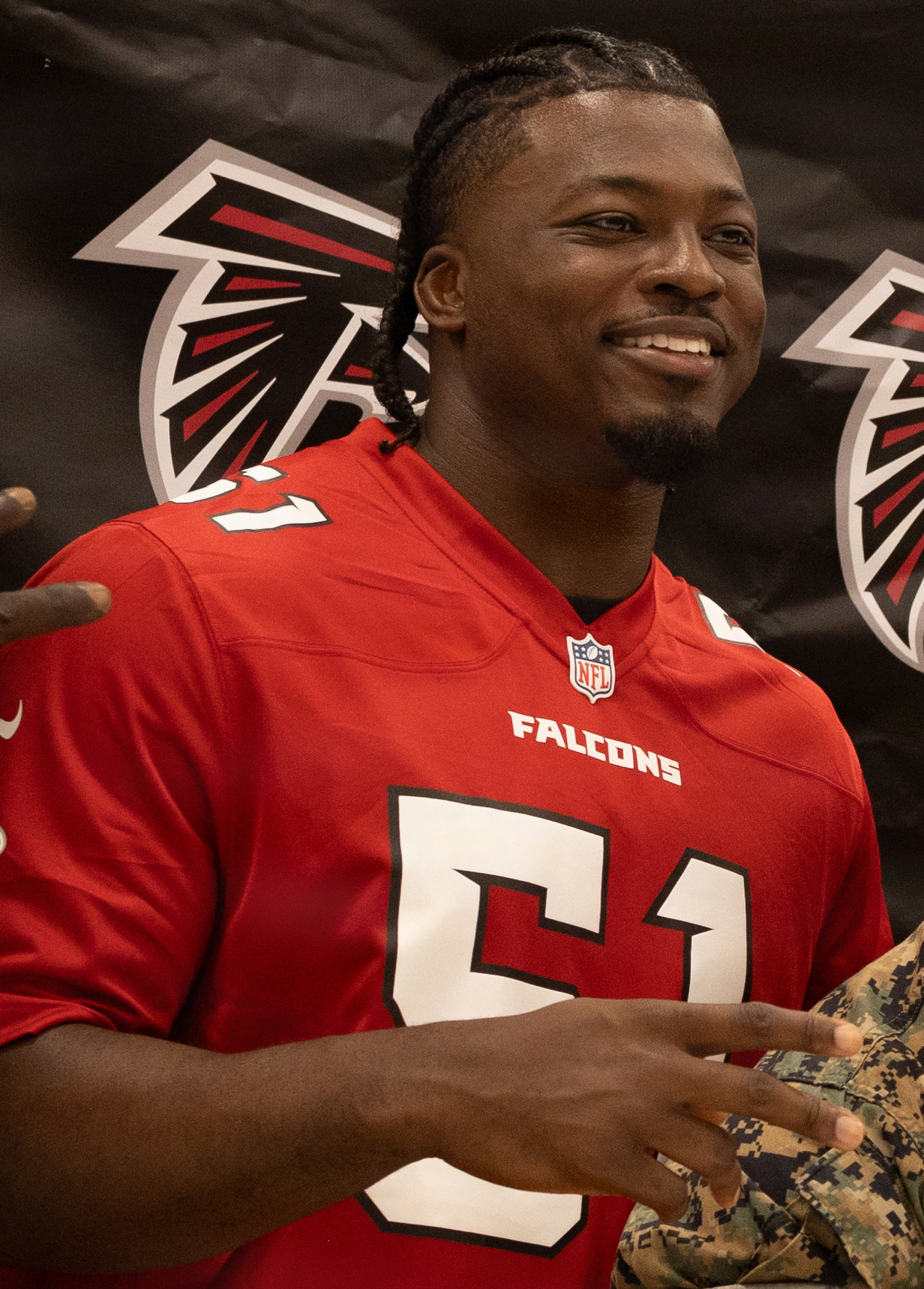
- Ojulari with the Atlanta Falcons in 2026

No. 52 – Las Vegas Raiders
- Position: Defensive end
- Roster status: Practice squad

Personal information
- Born: June 16, 2000 (age 26); Austell, Georgia, U.S.
- Listed height: 6 ft 3 in (1.91 m)
- Listed weight: 240 lb (109 kg)

Career information
- High school: Marietta (Marietta, Georgia)
- College: Georgia (2018–2020)
- NFL draft: 2021: 2nd round, 50th overall pick

Career history
- New York Giants (2021–2024); Philadelphia Eagles (2025); Atlanta Falcons (2026)*; Las Vegas Raiders (2026–present)*
- * Offseason or practice squad member only

Awards and highlights
- Second-team All-SEC (2020)

Career NFL statistics as of 2025
- Total tackles: 113
- Sacks: 22
- Forced fumbles: 4
- Fumble recoveries: 3
- Pass deflections: 3
- Stats at Pro Football Reference

Azeez O. Ojulari (born June 16, 2000) is an American professional football defensive end for the Las Vegas Raiders of the National Football League (NFL). He played college football for the Georgia Bulldogs and was selected by the New York Giants in the second round of the 2021 NFL draft.

== Early life ==
Ojulari was born on June 16, 2000, in Austell, Georgia to Nigerian parents, and attended Marietta High School in Marietta, Georgia. As a senior, he had 118 tackles and 11 sacks before suffering a torn ACL. He was selected to the 2018 U.S. Army All-American Bowl. He committed to the University of Georgia to play college football.

== College career ==
After recovering from the torn ACL he suffered his senior season of high school, Ojulari played in two games his first year at Georgia in 2018 and took a redshirt. As a redshirt freshman in 2019, he played in all 14 games and made 13 starts. He recorded 36 tackles and 5.5 sacks. Ojulari returned to Georgia in 2020 as a starter. During the 2020 season Ojulari was named second-team All-SEC and was the defensive MVP of the 2021 Peach Bowl.

== Professional career ==
Pre-draft measurables
Height	Weight	Arm length	Hand span	Wingspan	40-yard dash	10-yard split	20-yard split	20-yard shuttle	Three-cone drill	Vertical jump	Broad jump	Bench press
6 ft 2 1/4 in (1.89 m)	249 lb (113 kg)	34 1/2 in (0.88 m)	10 1/2 in (0.27 m)	6 ft 10 1/2 in (2.10 m)	4.61 s	1.60 s	2.70 s	4.34 s	7.27 s	30.0 in (0.76 m)	10 ft 7 in (3.23 m)	26 reps
All values from Pro Day

=== New York Giants ===
Ojulari was selected by the New York Giants in the second round (50th overall) of the 2021 NFL draft. He signed his four-year rookie contract on May 13, 2021. Ojulari finished the season with 8 sacks which set an all-time Giants record for sacks by a rookie, surpassing B. J. Hill, who recorded 5.5 sacks in 2018.

On October 22, 2022, Ojulari was placed on injured reserve. On December 3, he was activated from injured reserve. He finished the 2022 season with 5.5 sacks, ending the season second on the team behind nose tackle Dexter Lawrence in sacks.

On October 14, 2023, Ojulari was placed on injured reserve. On November 11, the Giants reactivated him back on their active roster.

=== Philadelphia Eagles ===
On March 19, 2025, the Philadelphia Eagles signed Ojulari to a one-year deal worth $4 million. He was placed on injured reserve on November 1, due to a hamstring injury.

=== Atlanta Falcons ===
On March 11, 2026, the Atlanta Falcons signed Ojulari to a one-year, $1.4 million contract. On August 30, Ojulari was waived by the Falcons as a part of final roster cuts.

=== Las Vegas Raiders ===
On September 3, 2026, Ojulari was signed to the Las Vegas Raiders' practice squad.

== Personal life ==
Ojulari was born the son of Nigerian immigrants; his maternal grandfather was the late Yoruban artist and musician Twins Seven Seven. His younger brother, BJ Ojulari, played college football at LSU and was drafted by the Arizona Cardinals in the 2023 NFL draft.
