= Tre' McKitty =

American football player (born 1999)

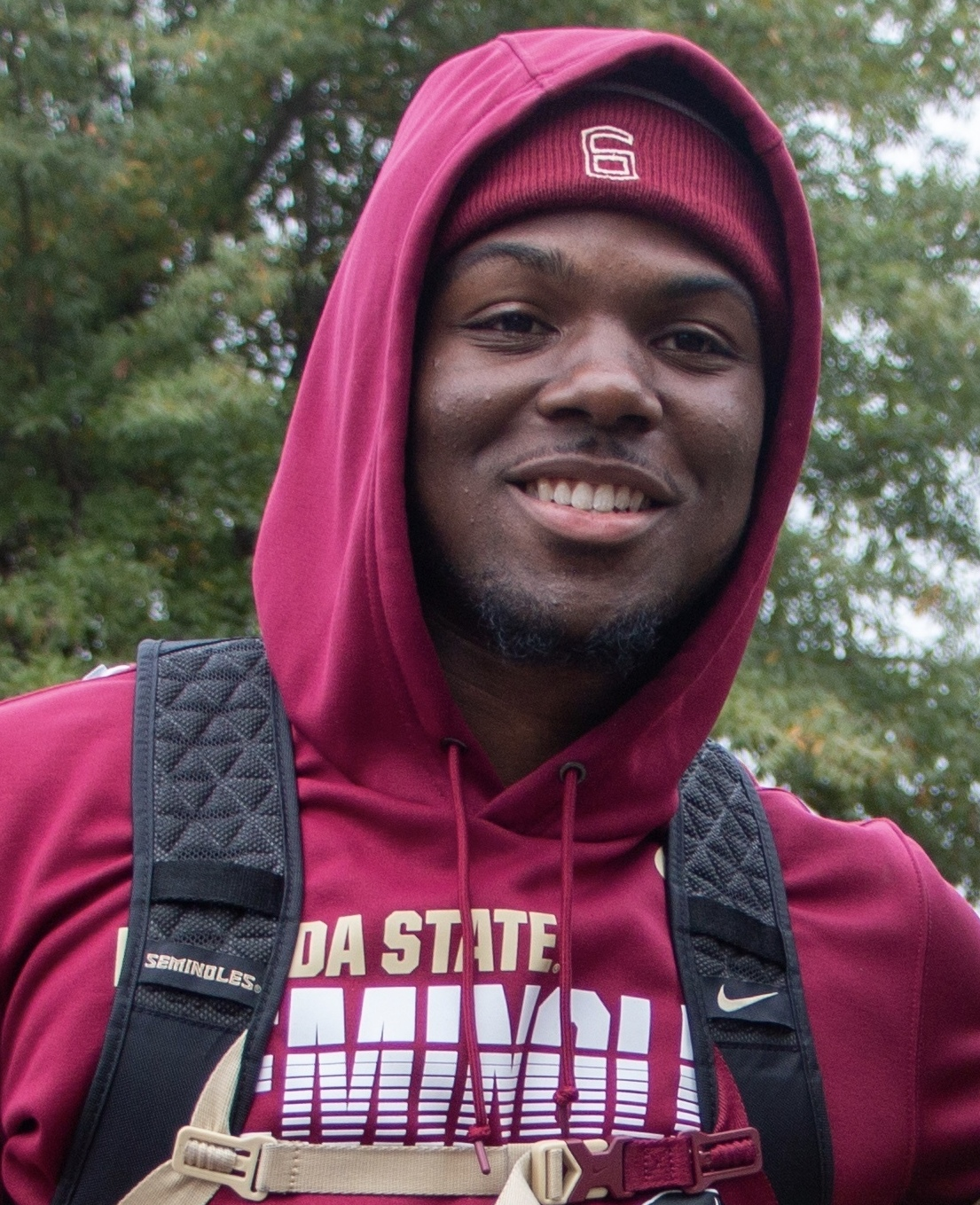
- McKitty at Florida State in 2019

Profile
- Position: Tight end

Personal information
- Born: January 12, 1999 (age 27); Wesley Chapel, Florida, U.S.
- Listed height: 6 ft 4 in (1.93 m)
- Listed weight: 246 lb (112 kg)

Career information
- High school: IMG Academy (Bradenton, Florida)
- College: Florida State (2017–2019); Georgia (2020)
- NFL draft: 2021: 3rd round, 97th overall pick

Career history
- Los Angeles Chargers (2021–2023); Buffalo Bills (2023)*; Cleveland Browns (2024)*; Houston Texans (2025)*; Louisville Kings (2026); Washington Commanders (2026)*
- * Offseason or practice squad member only

Awards and highlights
- UFL champion (2026)

Career NFL statistics as of 2025
- Receptions: 16
- Receiving yards: 117
- Stats at Pro Football Reference

Tre' Roosevelt McKitty (born January 12, 1999) is an American professional football tight end. He played college football for the Georgia Bulldogs and Florida State Seminoles. He was selected by the Los Angeles Chargers in the third round of the 2021 NFL draft.

== Early life ==
McKitty grew up in Wesley Chapel, Florida. He attended Wesley Chapel High School before transferring to IMG Academy in Bradenton, Florida after his freshman year. As a senior, McKitty caught 25 passes for 341 yards and four touchdowns. He initially committed to play college football at Oregon over an offer from Auburn. McKitty eventually decommitted from Oregon and committed to play at Florida State. He is of Jamaican descent.

== College career ==
McKitty was a member of the Florida State Seminoles for three seasons. McKitty played in 11 games with one reception for 23 yards during his freshman year. As a sophomore, he caught 26 passes for 256 yards and two touchdowns. McKitty finished his junior season with 23 receptions for 241 yards and graduated a year early. Following the season, he entered the transfer portal.

McKitty joined the Georgia Bulldogs and was eligible to play immediately as a graduate transfer. He became a starter for Georgia three games into the 2020 season and finished the year with six receptions for 108 yards and a touchdown.

== Professional career ==
Pre-draft measurables
Height	Weight	Arm length	Hand span	Wingspan	40-yard dash	10-yard split	20-yard split	20-yard shuttle	Three-cone drill	Vertical jump	Broad jump	Bench press
6 ft 4 1/4 in (1.94 m)	246 lb (112 kg)	32 3/4 in (0.83 m)	10 3/4 in (0.27 m)	6 ft 7 3/8 in (2.02 m)	4.70 s	1.65 s	2.81 s	4.34 s	7.38 s	30.0 in (0.76 m)	9 ft 11 in (3.02 m)	23 reps
All values from Pro Day

=== Los Angeles Chargers ===
McKitty was selected by the Los Angeles Chargers in the 3rd round, 97th overall, of the 2021 NFL draft. McKitty signed his four-year rookie contract with the Chargers on July 27, 2021.

On October 31, 2023, McKitty was released by the Chargers.

=== Buffalo Bills ===
On November 7, 2023, McKitty was signed by the Buffalo Bills to their practice squad. He signed a reserve/future contract with Buffalo on January 22, 2024.

On August 27, 2024, McKitty was released by the Bills as part of final roster cuts.

=== Cleveland Browns ===
On December 11, 2024, the Cleveland Browns signed McKitty to their practice squad. He signed a reserve/future contract with Cleveland on January 6, 2025.

On June 19, 2025, McKitty was waived by the Browns.

=== Houston Texans ===
On August 13, 2025, McKitty signed with the Houston Texans. He was waived by the Texans on August 20.

=== Louisville Kings ===
On January 14, 2026, McKitty was selected by the Louisville Kings of the United Football League (UFL).

=== Washington Commanders ===
On August 18, 2026, McKitty signed with the Washington Commanders. On August 30, he was waived by the Commanders as a part of final roster cuts before the start of the regular season.
