= Kelee Ringo =

American football player (born 2002)

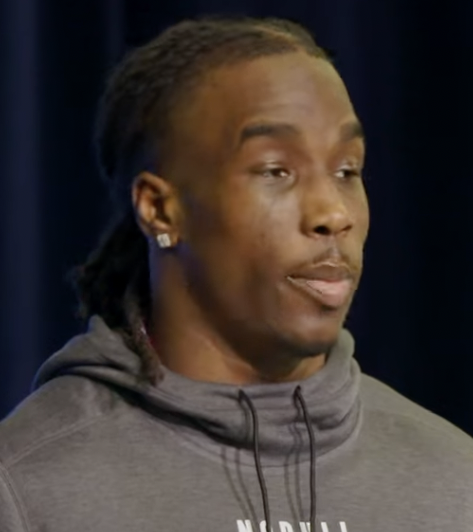
- Ringo at the 2023 NFL Combine

No. 7 – Philadelphia Eagles
- Position: Cornerback
- Roster status: Active

Personal information
- Born: June 27, 2002 (age 24); Tacoma, Washington, U.S.
- Listed height: 6 ft 2 in (1.88 m)
- Listed weight: 207 lb (94 kg)

Career information
- High school: Saguaro (Scottsdale, Arizona)
- College: Georgia (2020–2022)
- NFL draft: 2023: 4th round, 105th overall pick

Career history
- Philadelphia Eagles (2023–present)

Awards and highlights
- Super Bowl champion (LIX); 2× CFP national champion (2021, 2022); Second-team All-SEC (2022)

Career NFL statistics as of 2025
- Total tackles: 73
- Sacks: 1
- Forced fumbles: 2
- Fumble recoveries: 3
- Pass deflections: 5
- Interceptions: 1
- Stats at Pro Football Reference

Kelee Jahare-Hale Ringo (/ˈkiːli/ KEE-lee; born June 27, 2002) is an American professional football cornerback for the Philadelphia Eagles of the National Football League (NFL). He played college football for the Georgia Bulldogs. He was a two-time CFP national champion with the Bulldogs, winning in 2021 and 2022.

== Early life ==
Ringo attended Bellarmine Preparatory High School in Tacoma, WA before transferring to Saguaro High School in Scottsdale, Arizona. He was selected to the 2020 All-American Bowl. The number one ranked cornerback of his class, Ringo committed to play college football at the University of Georgia. Ringo also ran track in high school.

== College career ==
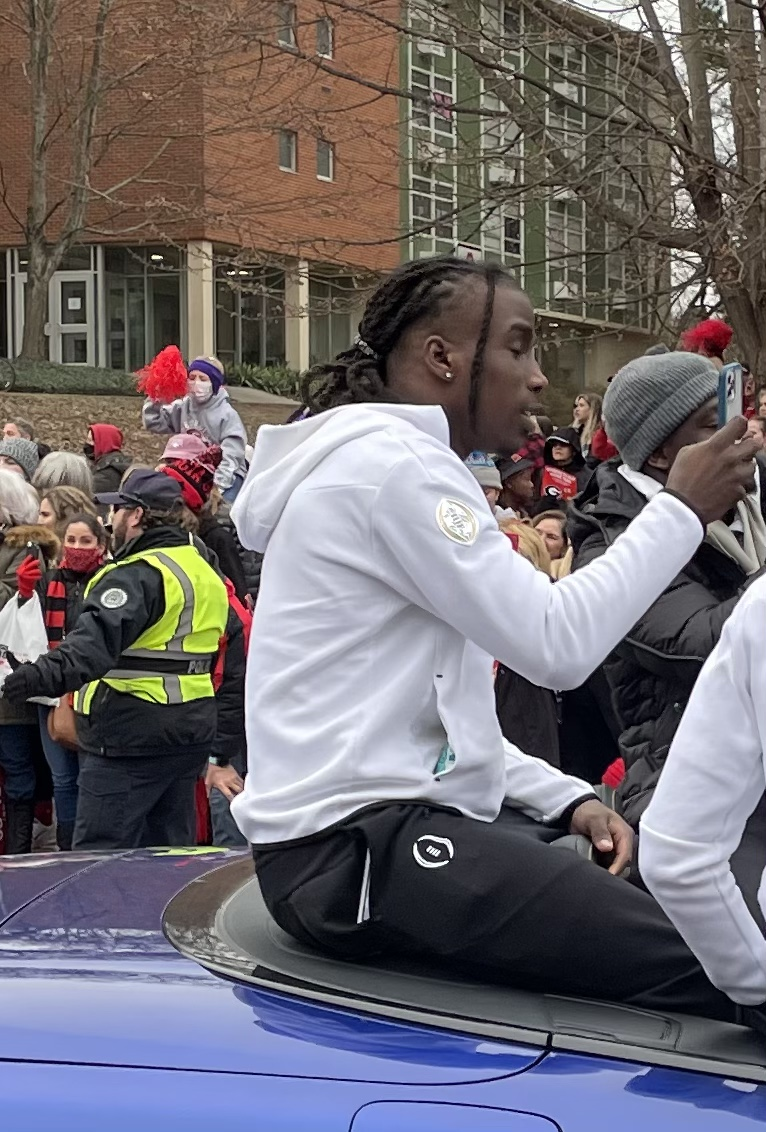
Ringo at Georgia's 2022 Championship parade

Ringo missed his first season at Georgia in 2020 due to a labrum injury and took a redshirt. He became a starter during his redshirt freshman season in 2021. He returned an interception for a touchdown late in Georgia's 2022 College Football Playoff National Championship win.

== Professional career ==
Pre-draft measurables
Height	Weight	Arm length	Hand span	Wingspan	40-yard dash	10-yard split	20-yard split	20-yard shuttle	Three-cone drill	Vertical jump	Broad jump	Bench press
6 ft 1 3/4 in (1.87 m)	207 lb (94 kg)	31 1/4 in (0.79 m)	8 1/2 in (0.22 m)	6 ft 2 1/8 in (1.88 m)	4.36 s	1.54 s	2.53 s	4.26 s	7.21 s	33.5 in (0.85 m)	10 ft 2 in (3.10 m)	10 reps
All values from NFL Combine/Pro Day

Ringo was selected by the Philadelphia Eagles in the fourth round, 105th overall, of the 2023 NFL draft. On December 18, 2023, Ringo started his first game against the Seattle Seahawks on Monday Night Football. The following week against the New York Giants, Ringo recorded his first career interception when he intercepted a potential game-tying touchdown pass off Tyrod Taylor in the end zone as time expired, sealing a narrow 33–25 victory for the Eagles. Ringo won a Super Bowl championship when the Eagles defeated the Kansas City Chiefs 40–22 in Super Bowl LIX.

== NFL career statistics ==
Legend
	Won the Super Bowl
**Bold**	Career high

=== Regular season ===
Year	Team	Games		Tackles					Interceptions						Fumbles				Scoring
Year	Team	GP	GS	Comb	Solo	Ast	Sck	TFL	PD	Int	Yds	Avg	Lng	TD	FF	FR	Yds	TD	D2P
2023	PHI	17	4	21	17	4	**1.0**	0	**2**	**1**	0	0.0	0	0	0	**1**	0	0	0
2024	PHI	17	1	15	12	3	0.0	0	1	0	0	0.0	0	0	**1**	**1**	0	0	**1**
2025	PHI	17	3	**37**	**29**	**8**	0.0	**1**	**2**	0	0	0.0	0	0	**1**	**1**	0	0	0
Career		51	8	73	58	15	1.0	1	5	1	0	0.0	0	0	2	3	0	0	1

=== Postseason ===
Year	Team	Games		Tackles					Interceptions						Fumbles			
Year	Team	GP	GS	Comb	Solo	Ast	Sck	TFL	PD	Int	Yds	Avg	Lng	TD	FF	FR	Yds	TD
2023	PHI	1	0	**2**	**1**	**1**	0.0	0	0	0	0	0.0	0	0	0	0	0	0
2024	PHI	4	0	0	0	0	0.0	0	0	0	0	0.0	0	0	0	0	0	0
2025	PHI	1	0	0	0	0	0.0	0	0	0	0	0.0	0	0	0	0	0	0
Career		6	0	2	1	1	0.0	0	0	0	0	0.0	0	0	0	0	0	0
