= Clinch County, Georgia =

County in Georgia, United States

- County
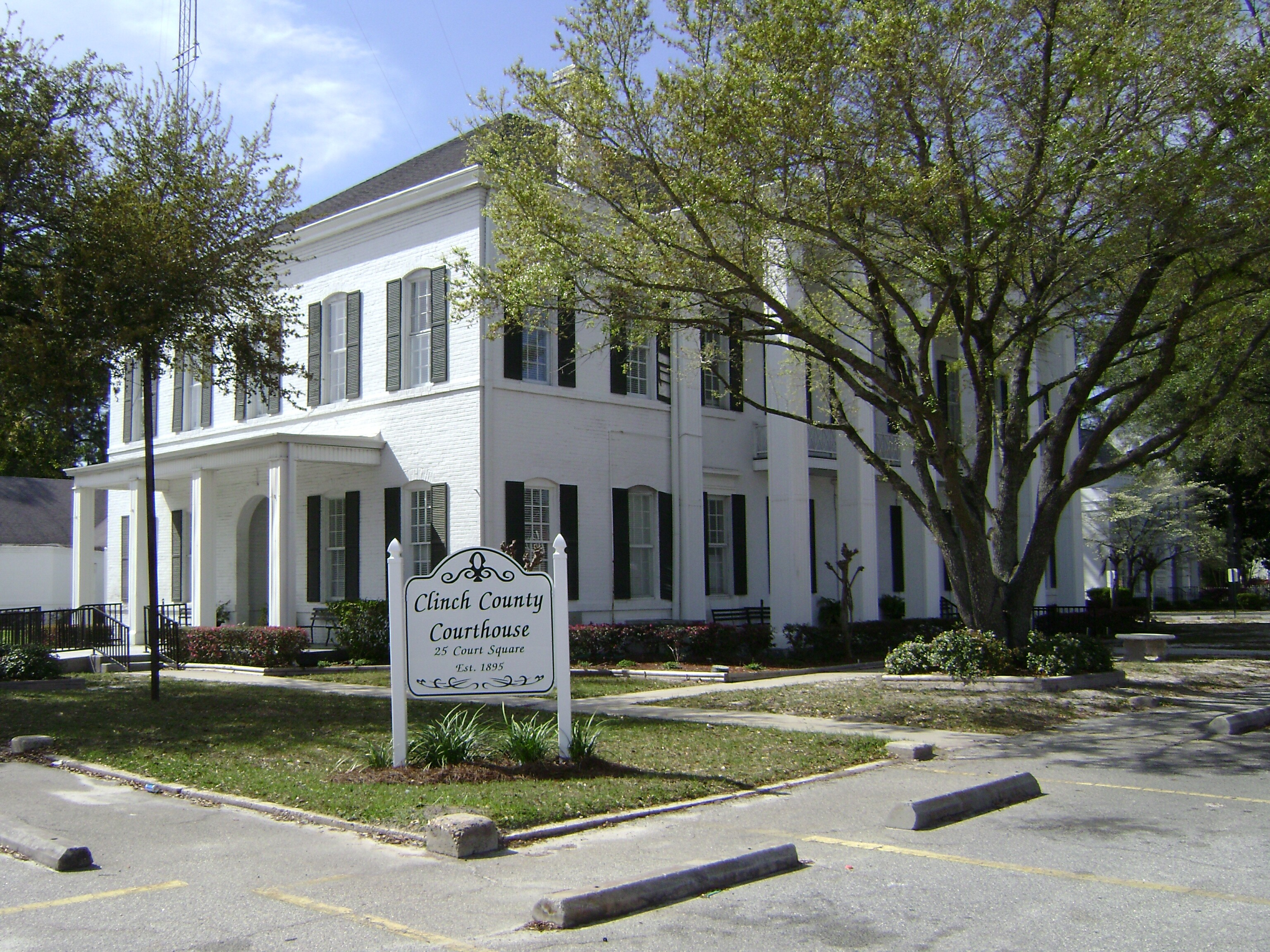
- Clinch County Courthouse in Homerville

- Seal

- Location within the U.S. state of Georgia
- Coordinates: 30°55′N 82°42′W
- Country: United States
- State: Georgia
- Founded: 1850; 176 years ago
- Named for: Duncan Lamont Clinch
- Seat: Homerville
- Largest city: Homerville

Area
  - Total: 824 sq mi (2,130 km^{2})
  - Land: 800 sq mi (2,100 km^{2})
  - Water: 24 sq mi (62 km^{2}) 2.9%

Population (2020)
  - Total: 6,749
  - Estimate (2025): 6,847 ▲
  - Density: 8.4/sq mi (3.2/km^{2})
- Time zone: UTC−5 (Eastern)
  - Summer (DST): UTC−4 (EDT)
- Congressional district: 8th
- Website: clinchcountyga.gov

Clinch County is a county located in the southeastern part of the U.S. state of Georgia. As of the 2020 census, the population was 6,749. The county seat is Homerville. The county was created on February 14, 1850, named in honor of Duncan Lamont Clinch.

== Geography ==
According to the U.S. Census Bureau, the county has a total area of 824 square miles (2,130 km^{2}), of which 800 square miles (2,100 km^{2}) is land and 24 square miles (62 km^{2}) (2.9%) is water. It is the fourth-largest county in Georgia by land area and third-largest by total area. Eastern and southeastern portions of the county lie within the Okefenokee Swamp and its federally protected areas.

The vast majority of Clinch County is located in the Upper Suwannee River sub-basin of the Suwannee River basin, with just a portion of the western and northwestern edge of the county, southwest and well northwest of Du Pont, located in the Alapaha River sub-basin of the same Suwannee River basin.

=== Major highways ===
- U.S. Route 84 / State Route 38
- U.S. Route 221 / State Route 31
- U.S. Route 441 / State Route 89
- State Route 37
- State Route 94
- State Route 122
- State Route 168
- State Route 177
- State Route 187

=== Adjacent counties ===
- Atkinson County (north)
- Ware County (east)
- Columbia County, Florida (south)
- Baker County, Florida (south)
- Echols County (southwest)
- Lanier County (west)

=== National protected area ===
- Okefenokee National Wildlife Refuge (part)

=== Cities ===
- Fargo
- Homerville

=== Towns ===
- Argyle
- Du Pont

=== Census-designated place ===
- Cogdell

=== Unincorporated communities ===
- Travisville
- Fivemile Still
- Edith
- Council

== Demographics ==
Historical population
| Census | Pop. | Note | %± |
|---|---|---|---|
| 1850 | 637 | | — |
| 1860 | 3,063 | | 380.8% |
| 1870 | 3,945 | | 28.8% |
| 1880 | 4,138 | | 4.9% |
| 1890 | 6,652 | | 60.8% |
| 1900 | 8,732 | | 31.3% |
| 1910 | 8,424 | | −3.5% |
| 1920 | 7,984 | | −5.2% |
| 1930 | 7,015 | | −12.1% |
| 1940 | 6,437 | | −8.2% |
| 1950 | 6,007 | | −6.7% |
| 1960 | 6,545 | | 9.0% |
| 1970 | 6,405 | | −2.1% |
| 1980 | 6,660 | | 4.0% |
| 1990 | 6,160 | | −7.5% |
| 2000 | 6,878 | | 11.7% |
| 2010 | 6,798 | | −1.2% |
| 2020 | 6,749 | | −0.7% |
| 2025 (est.) | 6,847 | ▲ | 1.5% |
U.S. Decennial Census; 1790-1880 1890-1910; 1920-1930 1930-1940; 1940-1950 1960-1980; 1980-2000 2010 2020

=== Racial and ethnic composition ===
Clinch County, Georgia – Racial and ethnic composition Note: the US Census treats Hispanic/Latino as an ethnic category. This table excludes Latinos from the racial categories and assigns them to a separate category. Hispanics/Latinos may be of any race.
| Race / Ethnicity (NH = Non-Hispanic) | Pop 1980 | Pop 1990 | Pop 2000 | Pop 2010 | Pop 2020 | % 1980 | % 1990 | % 2000 | % 2010 | % 2020 |
|---|---|---|---|---|---|---|---|---|---|---|
| White alone (NH) | 4,641 | 4,410 | 4,713 | 4,536 | 4,256 | 69.68% | 71.59% | 68.52% | 66.73% | 63.06% |
| Black or African American alone (NH) | 1,937 | 1,676 | 2,019 | 1,876 | 1,950 | 29.08% | 27.21% | 29.35% | 27.60% | 28.89% |
| Native American or Alaska Native alone (NH) | 18 | 8 | 27 | 38 | 30 | 0.27% | 0.13% | 0.39% | 0.56% | 0.44% |
| Asian alone (NH) | 6 | 6 | 8 | 13 | 22 | 0.09% | 0.10% | 0.12% | 0.19% | 0.33% |
| Native Hawaiian or Pacific Islander alone (NH) | x | x | 0 | 4 | 7 | x | x | 0.00% | 0.06% | 0.10% |
| Other race alone (NH) | 0 | 0 | 3 | 16 | 31 | 0.00% | 0.00% | 0.04% | 0.24% | 0.46% |
| Mixed race or Multiracial (NH) | x | x | 54 | 79 | 200 | x | x | 0.79% | 1.16% | 2.96% |
| Hispanic or Latino (any race) | 58 | 60 | 54 | 236 | 253 | 0.87% | 0.97% | 0.79% | 3.47% | 3.75% |
| Total | 6,660 | 6,160 | 6,878 | 6,798 | 6,749 | 100.00% | 100.00% | 100.00% | 100.00% | 100.00% |

=== 2020 census ===
As of the 2020 census, the county had a population of 6,749. Of the residents, 25.4% were under the age of 18 and 17.9% were 65 years of age or older; the median age was 39.8 years. For every 100 females there were 94.4 males, and for every 100 females age 18 and over there were 93.2 males. 0.0% of residents lived in urban areas and 100.0% lived in rural areas.

The racial makeup of the county was 63.8% White, 29.1% Black or African American, 0.4% American Indian and Alaska Native, 0.3% Asian, 0.2% Native Hawaiian and Pacific Islander, 2.1% from some other race, and 3.9% from two or more races. Hispanic or Latino residents of any race comprised 3.7% of the population.

There were 2,587 households in the county, of which 33.8% had children under the age of 18 living with them and 30.5% had a female householder with no spouse or partner present. About 27.3% of all households were made up of individuals and 13.0% had someone living alone who was 65 years of age or older. There were 1,639 families residing in the county.

There were 3,025 housing units, of which 14.5% were vacant. Among occupied housing units, 67.1% were owner-occupied and 32.9% were renter-occupied. The homeowner vacancy rate was 0.9% and the rental vacancy rate was 6.1%.

== Politics ==
As of the 2020s, Clinch County is a Republican stronghold, voting 78% for Donald Trump in 2024. For elections to the United States House of Representatives, Clinch County is part of Georgia's 8th congressional district, currently represented by Austin Scott. For elections to the Georgia State Senate, Clinch County is part of District 8. For elections to the Georgia House of Representatives, Clinch County is part of District 174.

United States presidential election results for Clinch County, Georgia
| Year | Republican | | Democratic | | Third party(ies) | |
| Year | No. | % | No. | % | No. | % |
|---|---|---|---|---|---|---|
| 1912 | 9 | 2.65% | 283 | 83.24% | 48 | 14.12% |
| 1916 | 8 | 1.84% | 374 | 85.98% | 53 | 12.18% |
| 1920 | 77 | 20.75% | 294 | 79.25% | 0 | 0.00% |
| 1924 | 13 | 4.91% | 235 | 88.68% | 17 | 6.42% |
| 1928 | 143 | 16.63% | 717 | 83.37% | 0 | 0.00% |
| 1932 | 11 | 2.32% | 461 | 97.26% | 2 | 0.42% |
| 1936 | 71 | 6.60% | 1,002 | 93.21% | 2 | 0.19% |
| 1940 | 63 | 5.67% | 1,049 | 94.33% | 0 | 0.00% |
| 1944 | 64 | 9.91% | 582 | 90.09% | 0 | 0.00% |
| 1948 | 168 | 9.63% | 1,283 | 73.57% | 293 | 16.80% |
| 1952 | 350 | 23.06% | 1,168 | 76.94% | 0 | 0.00% |
| 1956 | 518 | 24.73% | 1,577 | 75.27% | 0 | 0.00% |
| 1960 | 397 | 30.66% | 898 | 69.34% | 0 | 0.00% |
| 1964 | 1,084 | 60.56% | 706 | 39.44% | 0 | 0.00% |
| 1968 | 304 | 17.08% | 334 | 18.76% | 1,142 | 64.16% |
| 1972 | 1,127 | 82.50% | 239 | 17.50% | 0 | 0.00% |
| 1976 | 383 | 21.31% | 1,414 | 78.69% | 0 | 0.00% |
| 1980 | 513 | 27.52% | 1,325 | 71.08% | 26 | 1.39% |
| 1984 | 862 | 57.97% | 625 | 42.03% | 0 | 0.00% |
| 1988 | 863 | 58.91% | 594 | 40.55% | 8 | 0.55% |
| 1992 | 790 | 43.00% | 759 | 41.32% | 288 | 15.68% |
| 1996 | 789 | 40.42% | 973 | 49.85% | 190 | 9.73% |
| 2000 | 1,091 | 56.56% | 816 | 42.30% | 22 | 1.14% |
| 2004 | 1,501 | 66.18% | 750 | 33.07% | 17 | 0.75% |
| 2008 | 1,678 | 62.10% | 989 | 36.60% | 35 | 1.30% |
| 2012 | 1,598 | 64.57% | 852 | 34.42% | 25 | 1.01% |
| 2016 | 1,727 | 70.09% | 686 | 27.84% | 51 | 2.07% |
| 2020 | 2,105 | 73.55% | 744 | 26.00% | 13 | 0.45% |
| 2024 | 2,201 | 75.69% | 702 | 24.14% | 5 | 0.17% |

United States Senate election results for Clinch County, Georgia2
| Year | Republican | | Democratic | | Third party(ies) | |
| Year | No. | % | No. | % | No. | % |
|---|---|---|---|---|---|---|
| 2020 | 2,083 | 74.47% | 660 | 23.60% | 54 | 1.93% |
| 2020 | 1,839 | 74.94% | 615 | 25.06% | 0 | 0.00% |

United States Senate election results for Clinch County, Georgia3
| Year | Republican | | Democratic | | Third party(ies) | |
| Year | No. | % | No. | % | No. | % |
|---|---|---|---|---|---|---|
| 2020 | 1,066 | 39.48% | 239 | 8.85% | 1,395 | 51.67% |
| 2020 | 1,839 | 74.91% | 616 | 25.09% | 0 | 0.00% |
| 2022 | 1,630 | 77.47% | 439 | 20.87% | 35 | 1.66% |
| 2022 | 1,514 | 76.58% | 463 | 23.42% | 0 | 0.00% |

Georgia Gubernatorial election results for Clinch County
| Year | Republican | | Democratic | | Third party(ies) | |
| Year | No. | % | No. | % | No. | % |
|---|---|---|---|---|---|---|
| 2022 | 1,668 | 78.90% | 433 | 20.48% | 13 | 0.61% |

== Notable people ==
- Ossie Davis, actor
- Matthew Lintz, actor
- Iris Faircloth Blitch, politician, only woman to sign Southern Manifesto
- W. Benjamin Gibbs, politician
- William Chester Lankford, politician
- Jonathan Smith, NFL Player
- Tara Williams, WNBA Player

== See also ==
- National Register of Historic Places listings in Clinch County, Georgia
- List of counties in Georgia
