= Homerville, Georgia =

City in Georgia, United States

- City
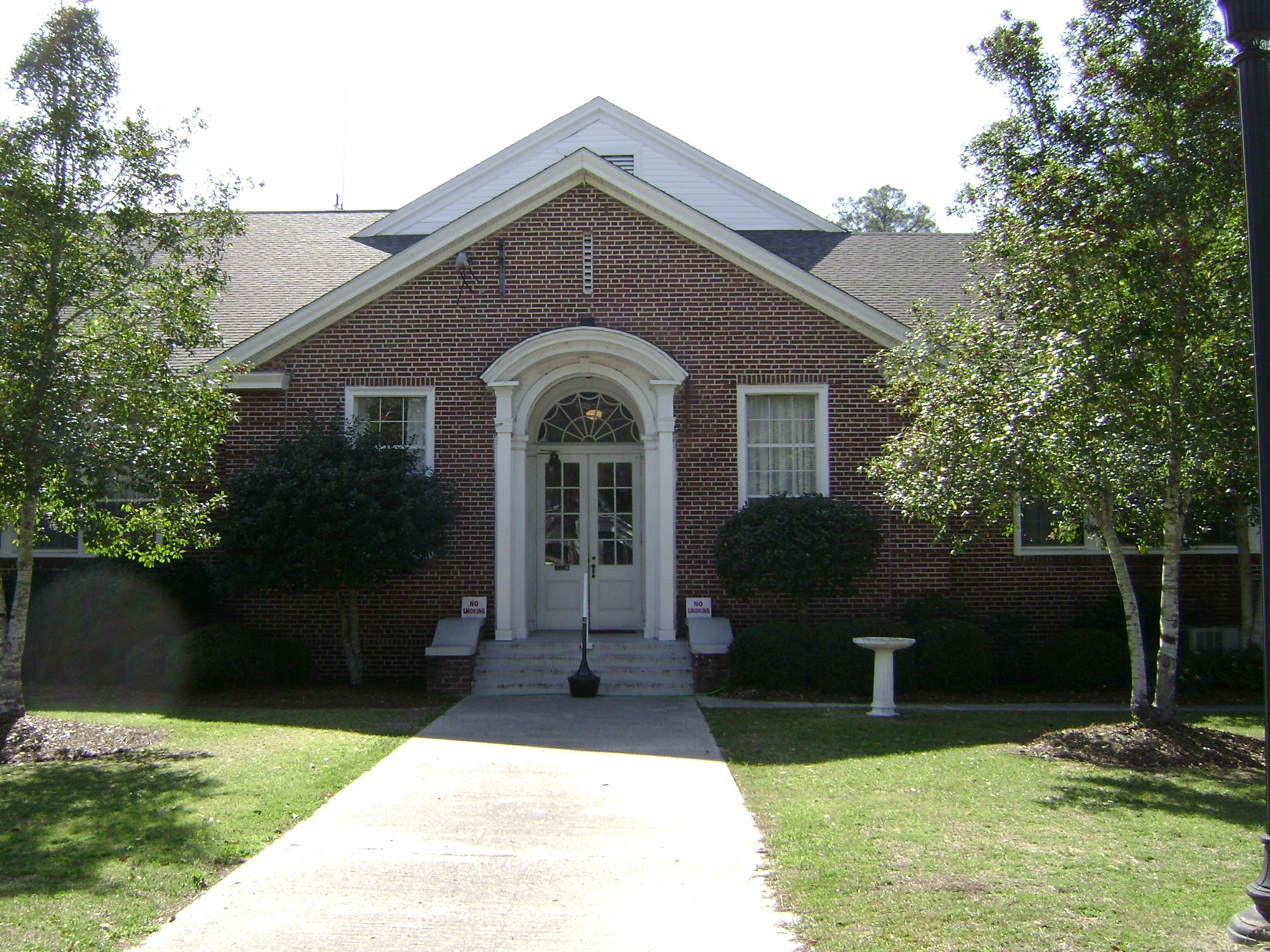
- Homerville City Hall in 2012

- Logo

- Location in Clinch County and the state of Georgia
- Coordinates: 31°2′13″N 82°45′5″W
- Country: United States
- State: Georgia
- County: Clinch

Area
  - Total: 3.51 sq mi (9.09 km^{2})
  - Land: 3.49 sq mi (9.05 km^{2})
  - Water: 0.015 sq mi (0.04 km^{2})
- Elevation: 177 ft (54 m)

Population (2020)
  - Total: 2,344
  - Density: 671/sq mi (259.1/km^{2})
- Time zone: UTC-5 (Eastern (EST))
  - Summer (DST): UTC-4 (EDT)
- ZIP code: 31634
- Area code: 912
- FIPS code: 13-39748
- GNIS feature ID: 0356319
- Website: cityofhomerville.com

Homerville is a city and the county seat of Clinch County, Georgia, United States. As of the 2020 census, Homerville had a population of 2,344. It was incorporated February 15, 1869.

== History ==
Clinch County was created on February 14, 1850, by an act of the Georgia General Assembly, and was named for General Duncan Lamont Clinch, a decorated United States brigadier general and Georgia congressman who had recently died. Clinch, Georgia's 95th county, was formed from land originally inhabited by the Oconee people and consolidated portions of Ware County and Lowndes County. The act creating the county named Elijah Mattox, Simon W. Nichol, Timothy Kirkland, Benjamin Sirmans, and John J. Johnson as commissioners charged with selecting a county seat and constructing a courthouse.

The designated commissioners quickly settled on a site just southwest of the present-day Homerville, and in memory of President James K. Polk decided to name the county seat "Polk". Two years later, however, the Georgia General Assembly inexplicably changed the name of the county seat to "Magnolia", just as the county's first courthouse was completed. The first courthouse was quite small and was destroyed in 1856 when a citizen, presumably dissatisfied with legal proceedings brought against him, decided to destroy the courthouse by fire.

In February 1853, Dr. John Homer Mattox and his family moved from their former home on the Suwannee River and settled on a tract of land adjacent to the Magnolia stage route. In recognition of his family name, he called the settlement Homersville. Shortly thereafter the Atlantic and Gulf Railroad expansion replaced the stage route, and Mattox's settlement was simply known as "Station No.11".

Over time the settlement grew, and in 1860 approximately 275 citizens of Clinch County petitioned the Georgia General Assembly to move the county seat from the nearby Magnolia to Mattox's settlement. Later the same year, the legislature relented and officially named Station No. 11 the county seat of Clinch County. By 1863, the town of Homersville was known as Forest. It would take approximately nine more years for the legislature to officially recognize the name Homerville and incorporate the city; however, Homerville shows up as the name of the county seat in newspapers by March 1864.

Dr. John Homer Mattox's original dwelling is now the home of the Clinch County Chamber of Commerce and Welcome Center. The home recently underwent an extensive restoration that not only restored many of the rooms to their former glory but also added modern plumbing and central heat and air for the convenience of visitors. The structure now holds the administrative offices of the chamber and a museum dedicated to the early days of Clinch County.

== Geography ==
Homerville is located in north-central Clinch County at 31°2′13″N 82°45′5″W (31.036832, -82.751302). U.S. Routes 84 and 441 cross in the center of town. US 84 leads east 27 miles (43 km) to Waycross and west 35 miles (56 km) to Valdosta, while US 441 leads north 35 miles (56 km) to Douglas, Georgia, and south 67 miles (108 km) to Lake City, Florida.

According to the United States Census Bureau, the city has a total area of 3.5 square miles (9.1 km^{2}), of which 0.02 square miles (0.04 km^{2}), or 0.50%, is water. Wooded areas and swampy marshes surround the city.

=== Climate ===
Homerville has a humid subtropical climate (Köppen: Cfa) with long, hot summers and short, mild winters.

Climate data for Homerville, Georgia (normals 1991–2020, extremes 1892–1948, 1956–2018, 2024–present)
Month	Jan	Feb	Mar	Apr	May	Jun	Jul	Aug	Sep	Oct	Nov	Dec	Year
Record high °F (°C)	85 (29)	88 (31)	94 (34)	95 (35)	100 (38)	104 (40)	103 (39)	103 (39)	102 (39)	97 (36)	89 (32)	86 (30)	104 (40)
Mean maximum °F (°C)	77.1 (25.1)	80.3 (26.8)	84.0 (28.9)	88.9 (31.6)	93.6 (34.2)	96.8 (36.0)	97.9 (36.6)	96.8 (36.0)	93.8 (34.3)	88.4 (31.3)	83.4 (28.6)	79.2 (26.2)	98.5 (36.9)
Mean daily maximum °F (°C)	61.8 (16.6)	66.0 (18.9)	72.3 (22.4)	79.0 (26.1)	85.8 (29.9)	90.2 (32.3)	92.1 (33.4)	90.9 (32.7)	87.4 (30.8)	79.8 (26.6)	70.8 (21.6)	64.0 (17.8)	78.3 (25.8)
Daily mean °F (°C)	49.7 (9.8)	53.2 (11.8)	59.3 (15.2)	65.3 (18.5)	72.5 (22.5)	78.8 (26.0)	81.0 (27.2)	80.5 (26.9)	76.7 (24.8)	67.6 (19.8)	57.8 (14.3)	51.8 (11.0)	66.2 (19.0)
Mean daily minimum °F (°C)	37.5 (3.1)	40.4 (4.7)	46.4 (8.0)	51.5 (10.8)	59.1 (15.1)	67.3 (19.6)	70.0 (21.1)	70.1 (21.2)	66.0 (18.9)	55.3 (12.9)	44.8 (7.1)	39.6 (4.2)	54.0 (12.2)
Mean minimum °F (°C)	20.2 (−6.6)	23.4 (−4.8)	29.4 (−1.4)	36.4 (2.4)	44.9 (7.2)	58.0 (14.4)	64.4 (18.0)	63.4 (17.4)	54.7 (12.6)	38.2 (3.4)	27.4 (−2.6)	23.4 (−4.8)	18.3 (−7.6)
Record low °F (°C)	3 (−16)	8 (−13)	19 (−7)	27 (−3)	32 (0)	45 (7)	54 (12)	56 (13)	40 (4)	27 (−3)	17 (−8)	7 (−14)	3 (−16)
Average precipitation inches (mm)	4.64 (118)	3.60 (91)	4.29 (109)	3.27 (83)	3.28 (83)	5.68 (144)	5.67 (144)	5.84 (148)	4.01 (102)	3.16 (80)	2.60 (66)	3.23 (82)	49.27 (1,250)
Average snowfall inches (cm)	0.0 (0.0)	0.0 (0.0)	0.0 (0.0)	0.0 (0.0)	0.0 (0.0)	0.0 (0.0)	0.0 (0.0)	0.0 (0.0)	0.0 (0.0)	0.0 (0.0)	0.0 (0.0)	0.0 (0.0)	0 (0)
Average precipitation days (≥ 0.1 in)	6.5	5.8	5.8	4.2	5.2	8.8	10.0	8.8	6.3	4.4	3.7	4.9	74.4
Source: NOAA

== Demographics ==
Historical population
Census	Pop.	Note	%±
1880	201		—
1900	434		—
1910	437		0.7%
1920	627		43.5%
1930	1,150		83.4%
1940	1,522		32.3%
1950	1,787		17.4%
1960	2,634		47.4%
1970	3,025		14.8%
1980	3,112		2.9%
1990	2,560		−17.7%
2000	2,803		9.5%
2010	2,456		−12.4%
2020	2,344		−4.6%
U.S. Decennial Census; 1850-1870 1870-1880; 1890-1910 1920-1930; 1940 1950 1960; 1970 1980 1990; 2000 2010

=== 2020 census ===
As of the 2020 census, Homerville had a population of 2,344. The median age was 36.8 years. 28.6% of residents were under the age of 18 and 17.9% were 65 years of age or older. For every 100 females there were 91.5 males, and for every 100 females age 18 and over there were 88.5 males age 18 and over.

0.0% of residents lived in urban areas, while 100.0% lived in rural areas.

There were 905 households in Homerville. About 35.2% of households had children under the age of 18, and 610 families resided in the city. Of all households, 32.9% were married-couple households, 22.0% were households with a male householder and no spouse or partner present, and 39.2% were households with a female householder and no spouse or partner present. About 32.9% of all households were made up of individuals, and 14.4% had someone living alone who was 65 years of age or older.

There were 1,072 housing units, of which 15.6% were vacant. The homeowner vacancy rate was 1.2% and the rental vacancy rate was 4.1%.

Homerville racial composition as of 2020
Race	Num.	Perc.
White (non-Hispanic)	1,067	45.52%
Black or African American (non-Hispanic)	1,086	46.33%
Native American	11	0.47%
Asian	17	0.73%
Pacific Islander	4	0.17%
Other/Mixed	81	3.46%
Hispanic or Latino	78	3.33%

== Education ==
=== Clinch County School District ===
The Clinch County School District holds pre-school to grade twelve, and consists of a headstart, elementary/middle school, and a high school.

The district has 96 full-time teachers and over 1,499 students.

- Clinch County Elementary School
- Clinch County Middle School
- Clinch County High School
