= List of Mississippi State Bulldogs football seasons =

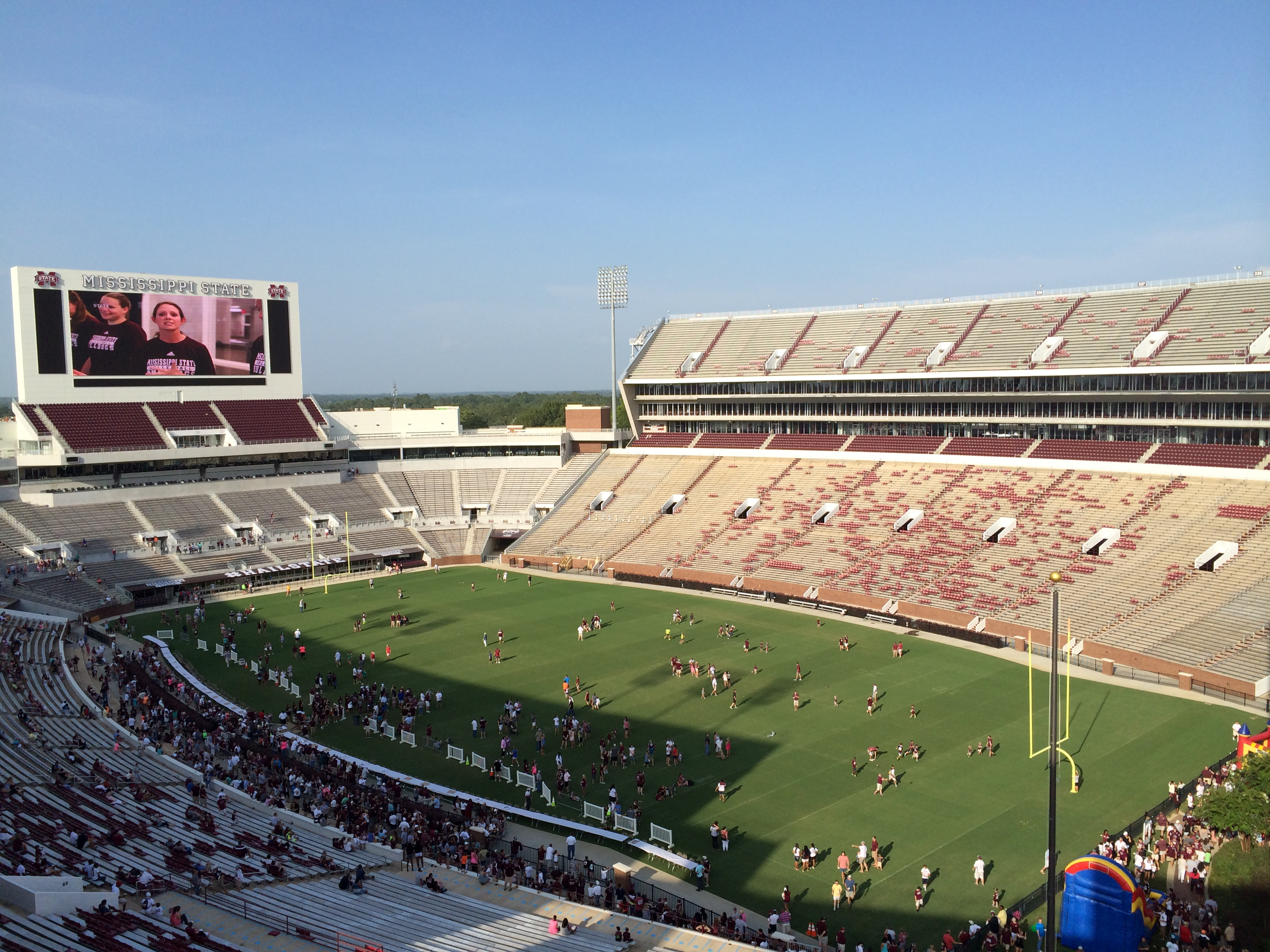
Davis Wade Stadium is the second-oldest stadium in the FBS.

This is a list of seasons completed by the Mississippi State Bulldogs football team. Representing Mississippi State University, the Bulldogs compete in the Southeastern Conference West Division in the NCAA Division I FBS. Since 1914, Mississippi State has played its home games out of 61,337-seat Davis Wade Stadium in Starkville, Mississippi. Initially known as the Mississippi A&M Aggies, the program began play in 1895 as an independent before joining the Southern Intercollegiate Athletic Association the following season. The school did not field a football program from 1897 to 1900. In 1921, Mississippi A&M joined the Southern Conference, where they competed for twelve seasons before joining the SEC where they currently reside.

The Bulldogs won their first and only SEC championship in 1941, and captured a division title in 1998. As of the end of the 2017 season, Mississippi State has played in 24 bowl games, compiling a 14–10 record. They have played in a bowl game in eleven consecutive seasons dating back to 2010. The team is currently led by head coach Jeff Lebby.

== Seasons ==
Legend

†National Champions
^{†} Conference champions
^{‡} Division champions
^Bowl game berth/Playoff Result

List of Mississippi State Bulldogs football seasons
| Season | Team | Head coach | Conference | Division | Regular season results | | | | | | | Postseason results | Final ranking | |
| Season | Team | Head coach | Conference | Division | Overall | | | Conference | | | | Bowl game/Playoff result | AP Poll | Coaches' Poll |
| Season | Team | Head coach | Conference | Division | Win | Loss | Tie | Win | Loss | Tie | Finish | Bowl game/Playoff result | AP Poll | Coaches' Poll |
|---|---|---|---|---|---|---|---|---|---|---|---|---|---|---|
Mississippi A&M Aggies
| 1895 | 1895 | W. M. Matthews | Independent | — | 0 | 2 | 0 | | | | — | — | — | — |
| 1896 | 1896 | J. B. Hildebrand | SIAA | — | 0 | 4 | 0 | | | | — | — | — | — |
| 1901 | 1901 | L. B. Harvey | SIAA | — | 2 | 2 | 1 | | | | — | — | — | — |
| 1902 | 1902 | L. Gwinn | SIAA | — | 1 | 4 | 1 | | | | — | — | — | — |
| 1903 | 1903 | Dan Martin | SIAA | — | 3 | 0 | 2 | | | | — | — | — | — |
| 1904 | 1904 | Dan Martin | SIAA | — | 2 | 5 | 0 | | | | — | — | — | — |
| 1905 | 1905 | Dan Martin | SIAA | — | 3 | 4 | 0 | | | | — | — | — | — |
| 1906 | 1906 | Dan Martin | SIAA | — | 2 | 2 | 1 | | | | — | — | — | — |
| 1907 | 1907 | Fred Furman | SIAA | — | 6 | 3 | 0 | | | | — | — | — | — |
| 1908 | 1908 | Fred Furman | SIAA | — | 3 | 4 | 0 | | | | — | — | — | — |
| 1909 | 1909 | W. D. Chadwick | SIAA | — | 5 | 4 | 0 | | | | — | — | — | — |
| 1910 | 1910 | W. D. Chadwick | SIAA | — | 7 | 2 | 0 | | | | — | — | — | — |
| 1911 | 1911 | W. D. Chadwick | SIAA | — | 7 | 2 | 1 | | | | — | — | — | — |
| 1912 | 1912 | W. D. Chadwick | SIAA | — | 4 | 3 | 0 | | | | — | — | — | — |
| 1913 | 1913 | W. D. Chadwick | SIAA | — | 6 | 1 | 1 | | | | — | — | — | — |
| 1914 | 1914 | Earle C. Hayes | SIAA | — | 6 | 2 | 0 | | | | — | — | — | — |
| 1915 | 1915 | Earle C. Hayes | SIAA | — | 5 | 2 | 1 | | | | — | — | — | — |
| 1916 | 1916 | Earle C. Hayes | SIAA | — | 4 | 4 | 1 | | | | — | — | — | — |
| 1917 | 1917 | Sid Robinson | SIAA | — | 6 | 1 | 0 | | | | — | — | — | — |
| 1918 | 1918 | Sid Robinson | SIAA | — | 3 | 2 | 0 | | | | — | — | — | — |
| 1919 | 1919 | Sid Robinson | SIAA | — | 6 | 2 | 0 | | | | — | — | — | — |
| 1920 | 1920 | Fred Holtkamp | SIAA | — | 5 | 3 | 0 | | | | — | — | — | — |
| 1921 | 1921 | Fred Holtkamp | Southern | — | 4 | 4 | 1 | | | | — | — | — | — |
| 1922 | 1922 | Dudy Noble | Southern | — | 3 | 4 | 2 | | | | — | — | — | — |
| 1923 | 1923 | Earl Abell | Southern | — | 5 | 2 | 2 | | | | — | — | — | — |
| 1924 | 1924 | Earl Abell | Southern | — | 5 | 4 | 0 | | | | — | — | — | — |
| 1925 | 1925 | Bernie Bierman | Southern | — | 3 | 4 | 1 | | | | — | — | — | — |
| 1926 | 1926 | Bernie Bierman | Southern | — | 5 | 4 | 0 | | | | — | — | — | — |
| 1927 | 1927 | John W. Hancock | Southern | — | 5 | 3 | 0 | | | | — | — | — | — |
| 1928 | 1928 | John W. Hancock | Southern | — | 2 | 4 | 2 | | | | — | — | — | — |
| 1929 | 1929 | John W. Hancock | Southern | — | 1 | 5 | 2 | | | | — | — | — | — |
| 1930 | 1930 | Chris Cagle | Southern | — | 2 | 7 | 0 | | | | — | — | — | — |
| 1931 | 1931 | Ray Dauber | Southern | — | 2 | 6 | 0 | | | | — | — | — | — |
Mississippi State Maroons
| 1932 | 1932 | Ray Dauber | Southern | — | 3 | 5 | 0 | | | | — | — | — | — |
| 1933 | 1933 | Ross McKechnie | SEC | — | 3 | 6 | 1 | 1 | 5 | 1 | 12th | — | — | — |
| 1934 | 1934 | Ross McKechnie | SEC | — | 4 | 6 | 0 | 0 | 5 | 0 | 12th | — | — | — |
| 1935 | 1935 | Ralph Sasse | SEC | — | 8 | 3 | 0 | 2 | 3 | 0 | T–9th | — | — | — |
| 1936 | 1936 | Ralph Sasse | SEC | — | 7 | 3 | 1 | 3 | 2 | 0 | 5th | Lost 1937 Orange Bowl against Duquesne, 12–13 | — | — |
| 1937 | 1937 | Ralph Sasse | SEC | — | 5 | 4 | 1 | 3 | 2 | 0 | 5th | — | — | — |
| 1938 | 1938 | Spike Nelson | SEC | — | 4 | 6 | 0 | 1 | 4 | 0 | 11th | — | — | — |
| 1939 | 1939 | Allyn McKeen | SEC | — | 8 | 2 | 0 | 3 | 2 | 0 | 4th | — | — | — |
| 1940 | 1940 | Allyn McKeen | SEC | — | 10 | 0 | 1 | 4 | 0 | 1 | 2nd | Won 1941 Orange Bowl against Georgetown, 14–7 | 9 | — |
| 1941 | 1941^{†} | Allyn McKeen | SEC | — | 8 | 1 | 1 | 4 | 0 | 1 | 1st^{†} | — | 16 | — |
| 1942 | 1942 | Allyn McKeen | SEC | — | 8 | 2 | 0 | 5 | 2 | 0 | 4th | — | 18 | — |
| 1943 | 1943 | Allyn McKeen | SEC | — | Season cancelled due to World War II. | | | | | | | | | |
| 1944 | 1944 | Allyn McKeen | SEC | — | 6 | 2 | 0 | 3 | 2 | 0 | 5th | — | — | — |
| 1945 | 1945 | Allyn McKeen | SEC | — | 6 | 3 | 0 | 2 | 3 | 0 | T–7th | — | — | — |
| 1946 | 1946 | Allyn McKeen | SEC | — | 8 | 2 | 0 | 3 | 2 | 0 | 5th | — | — | — |
| 1947 | 1947 | Allyn McKeen | SEC | — | 7 | 3 | 0 | 2 | 2 | 0 | 4th | — | — | — |
| 1948 | 1948 | Allyn McKeen | SEC | — | 4 | 4 | 1 | 3 | 3 | 0 | 7th | — | — | — |
| 1949 | 1949 | Arthur Morton | SEC | — | 0 | 8 | 1 | 0 | 6 | 0 | 12th | — | — | — |
| 1950 | 1950 | Arthur Morton | SEC | — | 4 | 5 | 0 | 3 | 4 | 0 | 7th | — | — | — |
| 1951 | 1951 | Arthur Morton | SEC | — | 4 | 5 | 0 | 2 | 5 | 0 | 11th | — | — | — |
| 1952 | 1952 | Murray Warmath | SEC | — | 5 | 4 | 0 | 3 | 4 | 0 | 7th | — | — | — |
| 1953 | 1953 | Murray Warmath | SEC | — | 5 | 2 | 3 | 3 | 1 | 3 | 6th | — | — | — |
| 1954 | 1954 | Darrell Royal | SEC | — | 6 | 4 | 0 | 3 | 3 | 0 | T–6th | — | — | — |
| 1955 | 1955 | Darrell Royal | SEC | — | 6 | 4 | 0 | 4 | 4 | 0 | 6th | — | — | — |
| 1956 | 1956 | Wade Walker | SEC | — | 4 | 6 | 0 | 2 | 5 | 0 | T–8th | — | — | — |
| 1957 | 1957 | Wade Walker | SEC | — | 6 | 2 | 1 | 4 | 2 | 1 | T–3rd | — | 14 | — |
| 1958 | 1958 | Wade Walker | SEC | — | 3 | 6 | 0 | 1 | 6 | 0 | 12th | — | — | — |
| 1959 | 1959 | Wade Walker | SEC | — | 2 | 7 | 0 | 0 | 7 | 0 | 12th | — | — | — |
| 1960 | 1960 | Wade Walker | SEC | — | 2 | 6 | 1 | 0 | 5 | 1 | 11th | — | — | — |
Mississippi State Bulldogs
| 1961 | 1961 | Wade Walker | SEC | — | 5 | 5 | 0 | 1 | 5 | 0 | T–10th | — | — | — |
| 1962 | 1962 | Paul E. Davis | SEC | — | 3 | 6 | 0 | 2 | 5 | 0 | 9th | — | — | — |
| 1963 | 1963 | Paul E. Davis | SEC | — | 7 | 2 | 2 | 4 | 1 | 2 | 4th | Won 1963 Liberty Bowl against NC State, 16–12 | — | 11 |
| 1964 | 1964 | Paul E. Davis | SEC | — | 4 | 6 | 0 | 2 | 5 | 0 | 8th | — | — | — |
| 1965 | 1965 | Paul E. Davis | SEC | — | 4 | 6 | 0 | 1 | 5 | 0 | T–9th | — | — | — |
| 1966 | 1966 | Paul E. Davis | SEC | — | 2 | 8 | 0 | 0 | 6 | 0 | T–9th | — | — | — |
| 1967 | 1967 | Charles Shira | SEC | — | 1 | 9 | 0 | 0 | 6 | 0 | T–9th | — | — | — |
| 1968 | 1968 | Charles Shira | SEC | — | 0 | 8 | 2 | 0 | 4 | 2 | 9th | — | — | — |
| 1969 | 1969 | Charles Shira | SEC | — | 3 | 7 | 0 | 0 | 5 | 0 | 10th | — | — | — |
| 1970 | 1970 | Charles Shira | SEC | — | 6 | 5 | 0 | 3 | 4 | 0 | T–7th | — | — | — |
| 1971 | 1971 | Charles Shira | SEC | — | 2 | 9 | 0 | 1 | 7 | 0 | 10th | — | — | — |
| 1972 | 1972 | Charles Shira | SEC | — | 4 | 7 | 0 | 1 | 6 | 0 | 9th | — | — | — |
| 1973 | 1973 | Bob Tyler | SEC | — | 4 | 5 | 2 | 2 | 5 | 0 | T–8th | — | — | — |
| 1974 | 1974 | Bob Tyler | SEC | — | 9 | 3 | 0 | 3 | 3 | 0 | T–4th | Won 1974 Sun Bowl against North Carolina, 26–24 | 17 | 17 |
| 1975 | 1975 (Note: All wins from 1975 to 1977 were forfeited by the NCAA, except for the 1975 victories over Memphis and North Texas State.) | Bob Tyler | SEC | — | 2 | 9 | 0 | 0 | 6 | 0 | T–9th | — | — | — |
| 1976 | 1976 | Bob Tyler | SEC | — | 0 | 11 | 0 | 0 | 6 | 0 | T–9th | — | 20 | — |
| 1977 | 1977 | Bob Tyler | SEC | — | 0 | 11 | 0 | 0 | 6 | 0 | T–9th | — | — | — |
| 1978 | 1978 | Bob Tyler | SEC | — | 6 | 5 | 0 | 2 | 4 | 0 | 7th | — | — | — |
| 1979 | 1979 | Emory Bellard | SEC | — | 3 | 8 | 0 | 2 | 4 | 0 | 8th | — | — | — |
| 1980 | 1980 | Emory Bellard | SEC | — | 9 | 3 | 0 | 5 | 1 | 0 | T–2nd | Lost 1980 Sun Bowl against Nebraska, 17–31 | 19 | — |
| 1981 | 1981 | Emory Bellard | SEC | — | 8 | 4 | 0 | 4 | 2 | 0 | 3rd | Won 1981 Hall of Fame Classic against Kansas, 10–0 | — | 17 |
| 1982 | 1982 | Emory Bellard | SEC | — | 5 | 6 | 0 | 2 | 4 | 0 | 8th | — | — | — |
| 1983 | 1983 | Emory Bellard | SEC | — | 3 | 8 | 0 | 1 | 5 | 0 | 8th | — | — | — |
| 1984 | 1984 | Emory Bellard | SEC | — | 4 | 7 | 0 | 1 | 5 | 0 | T–9th | — | — | — |
| 1985 | 1985 | Emory Bellard | SEC | — | 5 | 6 | 0 | 0 | 6 | 0 | 9th | — | — | — |
| 1986 | 1986 | Rockey Felker | SEC | — | 6 | 5 | 0 | 2 | 4 | 0 | T–7th | — | — | — |
| 1987 | 1987 | Rockey Felker | SEC | — | 4 | 7 | 0 | 1 | 5 | 0 | T–7th | — | — | — |
| 1988 | 1988 | Rockey Felker | SEC | — | 1 | 10 | 0 | 0 | 7 | 0 | 10th | — | — | — |
| 1989 | 1989 | Rockey Felker | SEC | — | 5 | 6 | 0 | 1 | 6 | 0 | 9th | — | — | — |
| 1990 | 1990 | Rockey Felker | SEC | — | 5 | 6 | 0 | 1 | 6 | 0 | T–8th | — | — | — |
| 1991 | 1991 | Jackie Sherrill | SEC | — | 7 | 5 | 0 | 4 | 3 | 0 | T–4th | Lost 1991 Liberty Bowl against Air Force, 15–38 | — | — |
| 1992 | 1992 | Jackie Sherrill | SEC | West | 7 | 5 | 0 | 4 | 4 | 0 | 3rd | Lost 1993 Peach Bowl against North Carolina, 17–21 | 23 | — |
| 1993 | 1993 | Jackie Sherrill | SEC | West | 4 | 5 | 2 | 3 | 4 | 1 | 4th | — | — | — |
| 1994 | 1994 | Jackie Sherrill | SEC | West | 8 | 4 | 0 | 5 | 3 | 0 | 2nd | Lost 1995 Peach Bowl against NC State, 24–28 | 24 | 25 |
| 1995 | 1995 | Jackie Sherrill | SEC | West | 3 | 8 | 0 | 1 | 7 | 0 | 4th | — | — | — |
| 1996 (Note: Overtime rules were added to college football in 1996, thereby eliminating ties.) | 1996 | Jackie Sherrill | SEC | West | 5 | 6 | | 3 | 5 | | 4th | — | — | — |
| 1997 | 1997 | Jackie Sherrill | SEC | West | 7 | 4 | | 4 | 4 | | T–3rd | — | — | — |
| 1998 | 1998^{‡} | Jackie Sherrill | SEC | West | 8 | 5 | | 6 | 2 | | T–1st^{‡} | Lost 1999 Cotton Bowl Classic against Texas, 11–38 | — | — |
| 1999 | 1999 | Jackie Sherrill | SEC | West | 10 | 2 | | 6 | 2 | | 2nd | Won 1999 Peach Bowl against Clemson, 17–7 | 13 | 12 |
| 2000 | 2000 | Jackie Sherrill | SEC | West | 8 | 4 | | 4 | 4 | | T–3rd | Won 2000 Independence Bowl against Texas A&M, 43–41 (OT) | 24 | 22 |
| 2001 | 2001 | Jackie Sherrill | SEC | West | 3 | 8 | | 2 | 6 | | 6th | — | — | — |
| 2002 | 2002 | Jackie Sherrill | SEC | West | 3 | 9 | | 0 | 8 | | 5th | — | — | — |
| 2003 | 2003 | Jackie Sherrill | SEC | West | 2 | 10 | | 1 | 7 | | 5th | — | — | — |
| 2004 | 2004 | Sylvester Croom | SEC | West | 3 | 8 | | 2 | 6 | | 6th | — | — | — |
| 2005 | 2005 | Sylvester Croom | SEC | West | 3 | 8 | | 1 | 7 | | 5th | — | — | — |
| 2006 | 2006 | Sylvester Croom | SEC | West | 3 | 9 | | 1 | 7 | | 6th | — | — | — |
| 2007 | 2007 | Sylvester Croom | SEC | West | 8 | 5 | | 4 | 4 | | T–3rd | Won 2007 Liberty Bowl against UCF, 10–3 | — | — |
| 2008 | 2008 | Sylvester Croom | SEC | West | 4 | 8 | | 2 | 6 | | T–4th | — | — | — |
| 2009 | 2009 | Dan Mullen | SEC | West | 5 | 7 | | 3 | 5 | | T–4th | — | — | — |
| 2010 | 2010 | Dan Mullen | SEC | West | 9 | 4 | | 4 | 4 | | 5th | Won 2011 Gator Bowl against Michigan, 52–14 | 15 | 17 |
| 2011 | 2011 | Dan Mullen | SEC | West | 7 | 6 | | 2 | 6 | | 5th | Won 2011 Music City Bowl against Wake Forest, 23–17 | — | — |
| 2012 | 2012 | Dan Mullen | SEC | West | 8 | 5 | | 4 | 4 | | 4th | Lost 2013 Gator Bowl against Northwestern, 20–34 | — | — |
| 2013 | 2013 | Dan Mullen | SEC | West | 7 | 6 | | 3 | 5 | | 5th | Won 2013 Liberty Bowl against Rice, 44–7 | — | — |
| 2014 | 2014 | Dan Mullen | SEC | West | 10 | 3 | | 6 | 2 | | 2nd | Lost 2014 Orange Bowl against Georgia Tech, 34–49 | 11 | 12 |
| 2015 | 2015 | Dan Mullen | SEC | West | 9 | 4 | | 4 | 4 | | T–5th | Won 2015 Belk Bowl against NC State, 51–28 | — | — |
| 2016 | 2016 | Dan Mullen | SEC | West | 6 | 7 | | 3 | 5 | | T–5th | Won 2016 St. Petersburg Bowl against Miami (OH), 17–16 | — | — |
| 2017 | 2017 | Dan Mullen / Greg Knox (interim) | SEC | West | 9 | 4 | | 4 | 4 | | T–5th | Won 2017 TaxSlayer Bowl against Louisville, 31–27 | 19 | 20 |
| 2018 | 2018 (Note: 8 wins vacated by NCAA Committee on Infractions (8/2019)) | Joe Moorhead | SEC | West | 0 | 5 | | 0 | 4 | | 4th | Lost 2019 Outback Bowl against Iowa, 22–27 | — | 25 |
| 2019 | 2019 | Joe Moorhead | SEC | West | 6 | 7 | | 3 | 5 | | 5th | Lost 2019 Music City Bowl against Louisville, 28–38 | — | — |
| 2020 | 2020 | Mike Leach | SEC | West | 4 | 7 | | 3 | 7 | | T–6th | Won 2020 Armed Forces Bowl against Tulsa, 28–26 | — | — |
| 2021 | 2021 | Mike Leach | SEC | West | 7 | 6 | | 4 | 4 | | T–3rd | Lost 2021 Liberty Bowl against Texas Tech, 7–34 | — | — |
| 2022 | 2022 | Mike Leach / Zach Arnett | SEC | West | 9 | 4 | | 4 | 4 | | T–3rd | Won 2023 ReliaQuest Bowl against Illinois, 19–10 | 20 | 19 |
| 2023 | 2023 | Zach Arnett / Greg Knox (interim) | SEC | West | 5 | 7 | | 1 | 7 | | T–6th | — | — | – |
| 2024 | 2024 | Jeff Lebby | SEC | – | 2 | 10 | | 0 | 8 | | 16th | – | – | – |
| 2025 | 2025 | Jeff Lebby | SEC | – | 5 | 8 | | 1 | 7 | | T–13th | Lost 2026 Duke's Mayo Bowl against Wake Forest, 29–43 | – | – |
| 2026 | 2026 | Jeff Lebby | SEC | – | 0 | 0 | | 0 | 0 | | – | – | – | – |
| Totals | | | | | All-time: 593–627–39 (.486) | | | Conference: 212–409–13 (.345) | | | — | Postseason: 15–12 (.556) | — | — |
