= 2021 Florida Gators football team =

American college football season

2021 Florida Gators football

Gasparilla Bowl, L 17–29 vs. UCF
- Conference: Southeastern Conference
- Eastern Division
- Record: 6–7 (2–6 SEC)
- Head coach: Dan Mullen (4th season; first 11 games); Greg Knox (interim)
- Offensive scheme: Spread
- Defensive coordinator: Todd Grantham (4th season; first 9 games); Christian Robinson (interim)
- Base defense: 3–4
- Home stadium: Ben Hill Griffin Stadium

2021 Southeastern Conference football standings
| | Conf. | | | Overall |
| Team | W | | L | W | | L |
|---|---|---|---|---|---|---|
Eastern Division
| No. 1 Georgia x#^ | 8 | – | 0 | 14 | – | 1 |
| No. 18 Kentucky* | 5 | – | 3 | 10 | – | 3 |
| Tennessee | 4 | – | 4 | 7 | – | 6 |
| Missouri | 3 | – | 5 | 6 | – | 7 |
| South Carolina | 3 | – | 5 | 7 | – | 6 |
| Florida | 2 | – | 6 | 6 | – | 7 |
| Vanderbilt | 0 | – | 8 | 2 | – | 10 |
Western Division
| No. 2 Alabama x$^ | 7 | – | 1 | 13 | – | 2 |
| No. 11 Ole Miss | 6 | – | 2 | 10 | – | 3 |
| No. 21 Arkansas | 4 | – | 4 | 9 | – | 4 |
| Mississippi State | 4 | – | 4 | 7 | – | 6 |
| Texas A&M | 4 | – | 4 | 8 | – | 4 |
| Auburn | 3 | – | 5 | 6 | – | 7 |
| LSU | 3 | – | 5 | 6 | – | 7 |
Championship: Alabama 41, Georgia 24
# – College Football Playoff champion; ^ – College Football Playoff participant; $ – Conference champion; x – Division champion/co-champions; * – Kentucky vacated all wins due to NCAA violations.; Rankings from AP Poll

The 2021 Florida Gators football team represented the University of Florida in the 2021 NCAA Division I FBS football season. The Gators played their home games at Ben Hill Griffin Stadium in Gainesville, Florida, and competed in the Eastern Division of the Southeastern Conference (SEC). They were led by fourth-year head coach Dan Mullen, who was fired on November 21, and were then led by interim head coach Greg Knox.

== Schedule ==
| Date | Time | Opponent | Rank | Site | TV | Result | Attendance |
|---|---|---|---|---|---|---|---|
| September 4 | 7:30 p.m. | Florida Atlantic* | No. 13 | Ben Hill Griffin Stadium; Gainesville, FL | SECN | W 35–14 | 86,840 |
| September 11 | 1:00 p.m. | at South Florida* | No. 13 | Raymond James Stadium; Tampa, FL | ABC | W 42–20 | 66,646 |
| September 18 | 3:30 p.m. | No. 1 Alabama | No. 11 | Ben Hill Griffin Stadium; Gainesville, FL (rivalry, SEC Nation) | CBS | L 29–31 | 90,887 |
| September 25 | 7:00 p.m. | Tennessee | No. 11 | Ben Hill Griffin Stadium; Gainesville, FL (rivalry) | ESPN | W 38–14 | 88,478 |
| October 2 | 6:00 p.m. | at Kentucky | No. 10 | Kroger Field; Lexington, KY (rivalry) | ESPN | L 13–20 | 61,632 |
| October 9 | 12:00 p.m. | Vanderbilt^{†} | No. 20 | Ben Hill Griffin Stadium; Gainesville, FL | SECN | W 42–0 | 86,258 |
| October 16 | 12:00 p.m. | at LSU | No. 20 | Tiger Stadium; Baton Rouge, LA (rivalry) | ESPN | L 42–49 | 96,012 |
| October 30 | 3:30 p.m. | vs. No. 1 Georgia | | TIAA Bank Field; Jacksonville, FL (rivalry, SEC Nation) | CBS | L 7–34 | 76,141 |
| November 6 | 7:30 p.m. | at South Carolina | | Williams–Brice Stadium; Columbia, SC | SECN | L 17–40 | 70,131 |
| November 13 | 12:00 p.m. | Samford* | | Ben Hill Griffin Stadium; Gainesville, FL | ESPN+/SECN+ | W 70–52 | 70,098 |
| November 20 | 4:00 p.m. | at Missouri | | Faurot Field; Columbia, MO | SECN | L 23–24 ^{OT} | 47,818 |
| November 27 | 12:00 p.m. | Florida State* | | Ben Hill Griffin Stadium; Gainesville, FL (rivalry) | ESPN | W 24–21 | 88,491 |
| December 23 | 7:00 p.m. | vs. UCF* | | Raymond James Stadium; Tampa, FL (Gasparilla Bowl) | ESPN | L 17–29 | 63,669 |
*Non-conference game; ^{†}Homecoming; Rankings from AP Poll released prior to the game; All times are in Eastern time

== Rankings ==
Ranking movements Legend: ██ Increase in ranking ██ Decrease in ranking — = Not ranked RV = Received votes
| | Week | | | | | | | | | | | | | | | |
| Poll | Pre | 1 | 2 | 3 | 4 | 5 | 6 | 7 | 8 | 9 | 10 | 11 | 12 | 13 | 14 | Final |
|---|---|---|---|---|---|---|---|---|---|---|---|---|---|---|---|---|
| AP | 13 | 13 | 11 | 11 | 10 | 20 | 20 | RV | RV | — | — | — | — | — | — | — |
| Coaches | 11 | 9 | 9 | 11 | 9 | 18 | 17 | RV | RV | — | — | — | — | — | — | — |
| CFP | Not released | | | | | | | | | — | — | — | — | — | — | Not released |

== Game summaries ==
=== Florida Atlantic ===
Florida Atlantic at No. 13 Florida Gators – Game summary

| Quarter | 1 | 2 | 3 | 4 | Total |
|---|---|---|---|---|---|
| Florida Atlantic | 0 | 0 | 0 | 14 | 14 |
| No. 13 Florida | 14 | 0 | 7 | 14 | 35 |

at Ben Hill Griffin Stadium • Gainesville, Florida

- Date: September 4, 2021
- Game time: 7:30 p.m. EDT
- Game weather: Temperature: 81 °F (27 °C) • Weather: Sunny • Wind: NE at 3 mph (4.8 km/h)
- Game attendance: 86,840
- Referee: Matt Loeffler
- TV announcers (SECN): Tom Hart (play-by-play), Jordan Rodgers (color) and Cole Cubelic (sideline reporter)
- Boxscore

Game information

First quarter

- Florida – Dameon Pierce 2-yard run (Chris Howard kick), 11:27
- Florida – Rick Wells 9-yard pass from Emory Jones (Chris Howard kick), 1:52

Third quarter

- Florida – Dameon Pierce 3-yard run (Chris Howard kick), 6:47

Fourth quarter

- Florida – Malik Davis 1-yard run (Chris Howard kick), 7:42
- Florida atlantic – Johnny Ford 2-yard run (Aaron Shahriari kick), 4:27
- Florida – Anthony Richardson 73-yard run (Jace Christmann kick), 3:43
- Florida atlantic – Brandon Robinson 13-yard pass from N'Kosi Perry (Aaron Shahriari kick), 1:37

Passing leaders

- FAU – N'Kosi Perry – 19/33, 261 yards, TD
- FLA – Emory Jones – 17/27, 113 yards, TD, 2 INT

Rushing leaders

- FAU – Johnny Ford – 10 carries, 52 yards, TD
- FLA – Anthony Richardson – 7 carries, 160 yards, TD

Receiving leaders

- FAU – D'Marcus Adams – 2 receptions, 85 yards
- FLA – Ja'Markis Weston – 3 receptions, 44 yards

Tackling leaders

- FAU – Jordan Helm – 11 tackles
- FLA – Ventrell Miller – 7 tackles

=== South Florida ===
No. 13 Florida Gators at South Florida Bulls – Game summary

| Quarter | 1 | 2 | 3 | 4 | Total |
|---|---|---|---|---|---|
| No. 13 Florida | 14 | 21 | 0 | 7 | 42 |
| South Florida | 3 | 0 | 10 | 7 | 20 |

at Raymond James Stadium • Tampa, Florida

- Date: September 11, 2021
- Game time: 1:00 p.m. EDT
- Game weather: Temperature: 82 °F (28 °C) • Weather: Cloudy
- Game attendance: 66,646
- Referee: Hank Johns
- TV announcers (ABC): Bob Wischusen (play-by-play), Dan Orlovsky (color) and Kris Budden (sideline reporter)
- Boxscore

Game information

First quarter

- Florida – Dameon Pierce 7-yard run, (Chris Howard kick), 11:06
- South florida – Spencer Shrader 25-yard field goal, 4:45
- Florida – Jacob Copeland 75-yard pass from Anthony Richardson, (Chris Howard kick), 4:34

Second quarter

- Florida – Xzavier Henderson 35-yard pass from Emory Jones, (Chris Howard kick), 12:36
- Florida – Jacob Copeland 41-yard pass from Anthony Richardson, (Chris Howard kick), 9:18
- Florida – Emory Jones 33-yard run, (Chris Howard kick), 6:41

Third quarter

- South florida – Spencer Shrader 32-yard field goal, 9:18
- South florida – Jaren Mangham 1-yard run, (Spencer Shrader kick), 4:41

Fourth quarter

- Florida – Anthony Richardson 80-yard run, (Chris Howard kick), 10:29
- South florida – Jaren Mangham 2-yard run, (Spencer Shrader kick), 4:22

Passing leaders

- FLA – Anthony Richardson – 3/3, 152 yards, 2 TD
- USF – Cade Fortin – 12/18, 91 yards, TD

Rushing leaders

- FLA – Anthony Richardson – 4 carries, 115 yards, TD
- USF – Darrian Felix – 13 carries, 40 yards

Receiving leaders

- FLA – Jacob Copeland – 5 receptions, 175 yards, 2 TD
- USF – Xavier Weaver – 2 receptions, 68 yards

Tackling leaders

- FLA – Mohamoud Diabate – 7 tackles
- USF – Vincent Davis – 8 tackles

=== No. 1 Alabama ===
No. 1 Alabama Crimson Tide at No. 11 Florida Gators – Game summary

| Quarter | 1 | 2 | 3 | 4 | Total |
|---|---|---|---|---|---|
| No. 1 Alabama | 21 | 0 | 7 | 3 | 31 |
| No. 11 Florida | 3 | 6 | 14 | 6 | 29 |

at Ben Hill Griffin Stadium • Gainesville, Florida

- Date: September 18, 2021
- Game time: 3:30 p.m. EDT
- Game weather: Temperature: 87 °F (31 °C) • Wind: E at 3 mph (4.8 km/h) • Weather: Cloudy
- Game attendance: 90,887
- Referee: Alex Moore
- TV announcers (CBS): Brad Nessler (play-by-play), Gary Danielson (color) and Jamie Erdahl (sideline reporter)
- Boxscore

Game information

First quarter

- Alabama – Jase McClellan 7-yard pass from Bryce Young, (Will Reichard kick), 11:21
- Florida – Chris Howard 25-yard field goal, 7:08
- Alabama – Jahleel Billingsley 26-yard pass from Bryce Young, (Will Reichard kick), 4:14
- Alabama – Brian Robinson Jr. 7-yard pass from Bryce Young, (Will Reichard kick), 0:48

Second quarter

- Florida – Malik Davis 26-yard run, 6:34

Third quarter

- Florida – Dameon Pierce 3-yard run, (Chris Howard kick), 10:20
- Alabama – Brian Robinson Jr. 3-yard run, (Will Reichard kick), 4:33
- Florida – Emory Jones 5-yard run, (Chris Howard kick), 00:29

Fourth quarter

- Alabama – Will Reichard 24-yard field goal, 9:30
- Florida – Dameon Pierce 17-yard run, 3:10

Passing leaders

- ALA – Bryce Young – 22/35, 233 yards, 3 TD
- FLA – Emory Jones – 17/27, 181 yards, INT

Rushing leaders

- ALA – Brian Robinson Jr. – 14 carries, 76 yards, TD
- FLA – Malik Davis – 10 attempts, 99 yards, TD

Receiving leaders

- ALA – Jameson Williams – 4 receptions, 61 yards
- FLA – Keon Zipperer – 4 receptions, 51 yards

Tackling leaders

- ALA – DeMarcco Hellams, 11 tackles
- FLA – Trey Dean, Gervon Dexter, Mohamoud Diabate, Rashad Torrence – 8 tackles

=== Tennessee ===
Tennessee Volunteers at No. 11 Florida Gators – Game summary

| Quarter | 1 | 2 | 3 | 4 | Total |
|---|---|---|---|---|---|
| Tennessee | 7 | 7 | 0 | 0 | 14 |
| No. 11 Florida | 10 | 7 | 14 | 7 | 38 |

at Ben Hill Griffin Stadium • Gainesville, Florida

- Date: September 25, 2021
- Game time: 7:00 p.m. EDT
- Game weather: Temperature: 80 °F (27 °C) • Wind: N at 2 mph (3.2 km/h) • Weather: Cloudy
- Game attendance: 88,478
- Referee: Matt Loeffler
- TV announcers (ESPN): Joe Tessitore (play-by-play), Greg McElroy (analyst) and Katie George (sideline)
- Boxscore

Game information

First quarter

- Florida – Malik Davis 4-yard pass from Emory Jones, (Jace Christmann kick) 9:20
- Tennessee – Tiyon Evans 47-yard pass from Hendon Hooker, (Chase McGrath kick), 7:05
- Florida – Jace Christmann 47-yard field goal, 1:07

Second quarter

- Tennessee – JaVonta Payton 75-yard pass from Hendon Hooker, (Chase McGrath kick), 11:31
- Florida – Nay'Quan Wright 23-yard run, (Jace Christmann kick), 4:15

Third quarter

- Florida – Kemore Gamble 13-yard pass from Trent Whittemore, (Jace Christmann kick), 12:21
- Florida – Rick Wells 9-yard pass from Emory Jones, (Jace Christmann kick), 2:04

Fourth quarter

- Florida – Malik Davis 9-yard run, (Jace Christmann kick), 1:39

Passing leaders

- TEN – Hendon Hooker – 13/23, 221 yards, 2 TD
- FLA – Emory Jones – 21/27, 209 yards, 2 TD

Rushing leaders

- TEN – Jabari Smith – 11 carries, 60 yards
- FLA – Emory Jones – 15 carries, 147 yards

Receiving leaders

- TEN – JaVonta Payton – 2 receptions, 82 yards, TD
- FLA – Justin Shorter – 3 receptions, 54 yards

Tackling leaders

- TEN – Trevon Flowers, 15 tackles
- FLA – Trey Dean, 11 tackles

=== Kentucky ===
No. 10 Florida Gators at Kentucky Wildcats – Game summary

| Quarter | 1 | 2 | 3 | 4 | Total |
|---|---|---|---|---|---|
| No. 10 Florida | 7 | 3 | 0 | 3 | 13 |
| Kentucky | 7 | 0 | 6 | 7 | 20 |

at Kroger Field • Lexington, Kentucky

- Date: October 2, 2021
- Game time: 6:00 p.m. EDT
- Game weather: Temperature: 75 °F (24 °C) • Wind: SW at 6 mph (9.7 km/h) • Weather: Cloudy
- Game attendance: 61,632
- Referee: Marc Curles
- TV announcers (ESPN): Bob Wischusen (play-by-play), Dan Orlovsky (color) and Kris Budden (sideline reporter)
- Boxscore

Game information

First quarter

- Florida – Ja'Quavion Fraziars 7-yard pass from Emory Jones, (Jace Christmann kick) 7:57
- Kentucky – Wan'Dale Robinson 41-yard pass from Will Levis, (Matt Ruffolo kick) 5:19

Second quarter

- Florida – Jace Christmann 51-yard field goal, 5:32

Third quarter

- Kentucky – Trevin Wallace 76-yard blocked field goal return, 6:36

Fourth quarter

- Kentucky – Chris Rodriguez Jr. 9-yard run, (Matt Ruffolo kick) 11:32
- Florida – Jace Christmann 33-yard field goal, 6:23

Passing leaders

- FLA – Emory Jones – 23/31, 203 yards, TD
- KEN – Will Levis – 7/17, 87 yards, TD

Rushing leaders

- FLA – Emory Jones – 13 carries, 63 yards
- KEN – Chris Rodriguez Jr. – 19 carries, 99 yards, TD

Receiving leaders

- FLA – Jacob Copeland – 6 receptions, 59 yards
- KEN – Wan'Dale Robinson – 4 receptions, 65 yards, TD

Tackling leaders

- FLA – Mohamoud Diabate, 11 tackles
- KEN – DeAndre Square, 13 tackles

=== Vanderbilt ===
Vanderbilt Commodores at No. 20 Florida Gators – Game summary

| Quarter | 1 | 2 | 3 | 4 | Total |
|---|---|---|---|---|---|
| Vanderbilt | 0 | 0 | 0 | 0 | 0 |
| No. 20 Florida | 14 | 7 | 21 | 0 | 42 |

at Ben Hill Griffin Stadium • Gainesville, Florida

- Date: October 9, 2021
- Game time: 12:00 p.m. EDT
- Game weather: Temperature: 77 °F (25 °C) • Wind: NW at 5 mph (8.0 km/h) • Weather: Cloudy
- Game attendance: 86,258
- Referee: Steve Marlowe
- TV announcers (SECN): Dave Neal (play-by-play), Matt Stinchcomb (analyst) and Taylor Davis (sideline)
- Boxscore

Game information

First quarter

- Florida – Dameon Pierce 1-yard run, (Jace Christmann kick) 11:16
- Florida – Ja'Quavion Fraziars 5-yard pass from Emory Jones, (Jace Christmann kick) 5:23

Second quarter

- Florida – Trent Whittemore 9-yard pass from Emory Jones, (Jace Christmann kick) 3:55

Third quarter

- Florida – Dameon Pierce 61-yard pass from Emory Jones, (Jace Christmann kick) 12:07
- Florida – Jacob Copeland 25-yard pass from Emory Jones, (Jace Christmann kick) 10:26
- Florida – Dameon Pierce 1-yard run, (Jace Christmann kick) 8:46

Passing leaders

- VAN – Ken Seals – 22/43, 192 yards
- FLA – Emory Jones – 14/22, 273 yards, 4 TD

Rushing leaders

- VAN – Patrick Smith – 17 carries, 76 yards
- FLA – Nay'Quan Wright – 7 carries, 46 yards

Receiving leaders

- VAN – Cam Johnson – 4 receptions, 49 yards
- FLA – Jacob Copeland – 5 receptions, 79 yards, TD

Tackling leaders

- VAN – Anfernee Orji, 7 tackles
- FLA – Rashad Torrence, 15 tackles

=== LSU ===
No. 20 Florida Gators at LSU Tigers – Game summary

| Quarter | 1 | 2 | 3 | 4 | Total |
|---|---|---|---|---|---|
| No. 20 Florida | 6 | 7 | 22 | 7 | 42 |
| LSU | 0 | 21 | 14 | 14 | 49 |

at Tiger Stadium • Baton Rouge, Louisiana

- Date: October 16, 2021
- Game time: 12:00 p.m. EDT
- Game weather: Temperature: 66 °F (19 °C) • Wind: NE at 14 mph (23 km/h) • Weather: Sunny
- Game attendance: 96,012
- Referee: Alex Moore
- TV announcers (ESPN): Sean McDonough (play-by-play), Todd Blackledge (analyst) and Molly McGrath (sideline)
- Boxscore

Game information

First quarter

- Florida – Dameon Pierce 7-yard run, 7:55

Second quarter

- LSU – Tyrion Davis-Price 18-yard run (Cade York kick), 14:29
- LSU – Jaray Jenkins 27-yard pass from Max Johnson (Cade York kick), 8:31
- LSU – Jaray Jenkins 5-yard pass from Max Johnson (Cade York kick), 6:51
- Florida – Justin Shorter 42-yard pass from Emory Jones (Jace Christmann kick), 0:00

Third quarter

- LSU – Dwight McGlothern 37-yard interception return (Cade York kick), 14:12
- Florida – Anthony Richardson 5-yard run (Anthony Richardson rush), 11:01
- LSU – Tyrion Davis-Price 40-yard run (Cade York kick), 10:08
- Florida – Justin Shorter 5-yard pass from Anthony Richardson (Jace Christmann kick), 7:59
- Florida – Dameon Pierce 11-yard pass from Anthony Richardson (Jace Christmann kick), 3:45

Fourth quarter

- LSU – Tyrion Davis-Price 25-yard run (Cade York kick), 14:27
- Florida – Jacob Copeland 33-yard pass from Anthony Richardson (Jace Christmann kick), 9:14
- LSU – Jaray Jenkins 1 yard pass from Max Johnson (Cade York kick), 3:30

Passing leaders

- FLA – Anthony Richardson – 10/19, 167 yards, 3 TD, 2 INT
- LSU – Max Johnson – 14/24, 133 yards, 3 TD

Rushing leaders

- FLA – Anthony Richardson – 7 carries, 37 yards, TD
- LSU – Tyrion Davis-Price – 36 carries, 287 yards, 3 TD

Receiving leaders

- FLA – Justin Shorter – 6 receptions, 113 yards, 2 TD
- LSU – Jaray Jenkins – 4 receptions, 50 yards, 3 TD

Tackling leaders

- FLA – Mohamoud Diabate – 9 tackles
- LSU – Damone Clark – 11 tackles

=== No. 1 Georgia ===
No. 1 Georgia Bulldogs vs. Florida Gators – Game summary

| Quarter | 1 | 2 | 3 | 4 | Total |
|---|---|---|---|---|---|
| No. 1 Georgia | 0 | 24 | 3 | 7 | 34 |
| Florida | 0 | 0 | 0 | 7 | 7 |

at TIAA Bank Field • Jacksonville, Florida

- Date: October 30, 2021
- Game time: 3:30 p.m. EDT
- Game weather: Temperature: 67 °F (19 °C) • Wind: W at 16 mph (26 km/h) • Weather: Cloudy
- Game attendance: 76,141
- Referee: David Smith
- TV announcers (CBS): Brad Nessler (play-by-play), Gary Danielson (color), Jamie Erdahl (sideline reporter)
- Boxscore

Game information

Second quarter

- Georgia – Jack Podlesny 21-yard field goal, 8:38
- Georgia – James Cook 11-yard run (Jack Podlesny kick), 2:16
- Georgia – Kearis Jackson 36-yard pass from Stetson Bennett (Jack Podlesny kick), 1:35
- Georgia – Nakobe Dean 50-yard interception return (Jack Podlesny kick), 0:07

Third quarter

- Georgia – Jack Podlesny 42-yard field goal, 1:15

Fourth quarter

- Florida – Emory Jones 2-yard run (Chris Howard kick), 2:49
- Georgia – Zamir White 42-yard run (Jack Podlesny kick), 1:57

Passing leaders

- UGA – Stetson Bennett – 10/19, 161 yards, 1 TD, 2 INT
- FLA – Emory Jones – 10/14, 112 yards

Rushing leaders

- UGA – Zamir White – 14 carries, 105 yards, TD
- FLA – Dameon Pierce – 9 carries, 69 yards

Receiving leaders

- UGA – Kearis Jackson – 3 receptions, 59 yards, TD
- FLA – Justin Shorter – 4 receptions, 50 yards

Tackling leaders

- UGA – Quay Walker – 13 tackles
- FLA – Trey Dean – 8 tackles

=== South Carolina ===
Florida Gators at South Carolina Gamecocks – Game summary

| Quarter | 1 | 2 | 3 | 4 | Total |
|---|---|---|---|---|---|
| Florida | 7 | 3 | 0 | 7 | 17 |
| South Carolina | 10 | 20 | 10 | 0 | 40 |

at Williams-Brice Stadium • Columbia, South Carolina

- Date: November 6, 2021
- Game time: 7:30 p.m. EDT
- Game weather: Temperature: 55 °F (13 °C) • Wind: NE at 9 mph (14 km/h) • Weather: Cloudy
- Game attendance: 70,131
- Referee: Alex Moore
- TV announcers (SECN): Taylor Zarzour (play-by-play), Matt Stinchcomb (analyst), Alyssa Lang (sideline)
- Boxscore

Game information

First quarter

- South Carolina – Parker White 39-yard field goal, 6:19
- Florida – Xzavier Henderson 12-yard pass from Emory Jones (Chris Howard kick), 4:47
- South Carolina – Juju McDowell 2-yard run (Parker White kick), 2:39

Second quarter

- Florida – Chris Howard 30-yard field goal, 14:52
- South Carolina – Parker White 35-yard field goal, 11:31
- South Carolina – Josh Vann 24-yard pass from Jason Brown (Parker White kick), 8:02
- South Carolina – Parker White 40-yard field goal, 1:13
- South Carolina – Jabari Ellis 18-yard fumble recovery (Parker White kick), 0:46

Third quarter

- South Carolina – Parker White 39-yard field goal, 8:04
- South Carolina – Jaheim Bell 8-yard pass from Jason Brown (Parker White kick), 2:53

Fourth quarter

- Florida – Rick Wells 9-yard pass from Emory Jones (Chris Howard kick), 14:14

Passing leaders

- FLA – Emory Jones – 17/30, 258 yards, 2 TD, INT
- SCAR – Jason Brown – 14/24, 175 yards, 2 TD

Rushing leaders

- FLA – Dameon Pierce – 6 carries, 39 yards
- SCAR – Kevin Harris – 16 carries, 128 yards

Receiving leaders

- FLA – Justin Shorter – 5 receptions, 92 yards
- SCAR – Josh Vann – 7 receptions, 111 yards, TD

Tackling leaders

- FLA – Mohamoud Diabate – 12 tackles
- SCAR – Jaylan Foster – 8 tackles

=== Samford ===
Samford Bulldogs at Florida Gators – Game summary

| Quarter | 1 | 2 | 3 | 4 | Total |
|---|---|---|---|---|---|
| Samford | 21 | 21 | 0 | 10 | 52 |
| Florida | 14 | 21 | 21 | 14 | 70 |

at Ben Hill Griffin Stadium • Gainesville, Florida

- Date: November 13, 2021
- Game time: 12:00 p.m. EST
- Game weather: Temperature: 64 °F (18 °C) • Wind: SW at 5 mph (8.0 km/h) • Weather: Rain
- Game attendance: 70,098
- Referee: Lee Hedrick
- TV announcers (ESPN+ and SECN+): Mike Couzens (play-by-play), Dustin Fox (analyst)
- Boxscore

Game information

First quarter

- Samford – Montrell Washington 1 yard pass from Liam Welch (Zach Williams kick), 10:26
- Florida – Malik Davis 6-yard run (Chris Howard kick), 6:56
- Samford – Michael Vice 58-yard pass from Liam Welch (Zach Williams kick), 4:53
- Florida – Ja'Markis Weston 9-yard pass from Emory Jones (Chris Howard kick), 4:02
- Samford – Jay Stanton 40-yard pass from Liam Welch (Zach Williams kick), 1:25

Second quarter

- Florida – Emory Jones 31-yard run (Chris Howard kick), 14:19
- Samford – Liam Welch 4-yard run (Zach Williams kick), 10:02
- Florida – Dameon Pierce 1 yard run (Chris Howard kick), 8:10
- Samford – Montrell Washington 98-yard kickoff return (Zach Williams kick), 7:55
- Samford – Liam Welch 10-yard run (Zach Williams kick), 3:17
- Florida – Nay'Quan Wright 45-yard pass from Emory Jones (Chris Howard kick), 1:03

Third quarter

- Florida – Malik Davis 48-yard pass from Emory Jones (Chris Howard kick), 12:34
- Florida – Kemore Gamble 7-yard pass from Emory Jones (Chris Howard kick), 6:12
- Florida – Dameon Pierce 13-yard pass from Emory Jones (Chris Howard kick), 1:24

Fourth quarter

- Samford – Montrell Washington 23-yard pass from Liam Welch (Zach Williams kick), 13:59
- Samford – Zach Williams 33-yard field goal, 11:59
- Florida – Kemore Gamble 18-yard pass from Emory Jones (Chris Howard kick), 9:03
- Florida – Dameon Pierce 24-yard run (Chris Howard kick), 5:37

Passing leaders

- SAM – Liam Welch – 33/52, 400 yards, 3 TD, INT
- FLA – Emory Jones – 28/34, 464 yards, 6 TD

Rushing leaders

- SAM – Liam Welch – 16 carries, 65 yards, 2 TD
- FLA – Emory Jones – 10 carries, 86 yards, TD

Receiving leaders

- SAM – Montrell Washington – 10 receptions, 124 yards, TD
- FLA – Kemore Gamble – 6 receptions, 122 yards, 2 TD

Tackling leaders

- SAM – Nathan East – 9 tackles
- FLA – Rashad Torrance – 12 tackles

=== Missouri ===
Florida Gators at Missouri Tigers – Game summary

| Quarter | 1 | 2 | 3 | 4 | OT | Total |
|---|---|---|---|---|---|---|
| Florida | 3 | 3 | 7 | 3 | 7 | 23 |
| Missouri | 3 | 6 | 0 | 7 | 8 | 24 |

at Faurot Field • Columbia, Missouri

- Date: November 20, 2021
- Game time: 4:00 p.m. EST
- Game weather: Temperature: 60 °F (16 °C) • Wind: S at 5 mph (8.0 km/h) • Weather: Sunny
- Game attendance: 47,818
- Referee: James Carter
- TV announcers (SECN): Dave Neal (play-by-play), Deuce McAllister (analyst), Andraya Carter (sideline)
- Boxscore

Game information

First quarter

- Florida – Chris Howard 42-yard field goal, 9:49
- Missouri – Harrison Mevis 39-yard field goal, 2:40

Second quarter

- Florida – Chris Howard 26-yard field goal, 9:35
- Missouri – Harrison Mevis 46-yard field goal, 6:56
- Missouri – Harrison Mevis 31-yard field goal, 1:34

Third quarter

- Florida – Dameon Pierce 2-yard run (Chris Howard kick), 12:52

Fourth quarter

- Missouri – Niko Hea 41-yard pass from Connor Bazelak (Harrison Mevis kick), 11:53
- Florida – Chris Howard 33-yard field goal, 8:30

Overtime

- Florida – Emory Jones 6-yard pass from Trent Whittemore (Chris Howard kick)
- Missouri – Tyler Badie 13-yard run (Connor Bazelak pass to Daniel Parker, Jr.)

Passing leaders

- FLA – Emory Jones – 20/32, 261 yards
- MIZZ – Connor Bazelak – 15/26, 165 yards, TD

Rushing leaders

- FLA – Emory Jones – 17 carries, 45 yards
- MIZZ – Tyler Badie – 27 carries, 146 yards, TD

Receiving leaders

- FLA – Jacob Copeland – 8 receptions, 102 yards
- MIZZ – Tauskie Dove – 2 receptions, 72 yards

Tackling leaders

- FLA – Ty'Ron Hopper – 12 tackles
- MIZZ – Chad Bailey – 9 tackles

=== Florida State ===
Florida State Seminoles at Florida Gators – Game summary

| Quarter | 1 | 2 | 3 | 4 | Total |
|---|---|---|---|---|---|
| Florida State | 0 | 7 | 0 | 14 | 21 |
| Florida | 7 | 0 | 10 | 7 | 24 |

at Ben Hill Griffin Stadium • Gainesville, Florida

- Date: November 27, 2021
- Game time: 12:00 p.m. EST
- Game weather: Temperature: 60 °F (16 °C) • Wind: 4 mph (6.4 km/h) • Weather: Sunny
- Game attendance: 88,491
- Referee: Stuart Mullins
- TV announcers (ESPN): Mark Jones (play-by-play), Robert Griffin III (analyst), Quint Kessenich (sideline)
- Boxscore

Game information

First quarter

- Florida – Kemore Gamble 47-yard pass from Emory Jones (Chris Howard kick), 10:54

Second quarter

- Florida State – Jordan Travis 9-yard run (Ryan Fitzgerald kick), 6:45

Third quarter

- Florida – Chris Howard 36-yard field goal, 11:09
- Florida – Justin Shorter 5-yard pass from Anthony Richardson (Chris Howard kick), 2:09

Fourth quarter

- Florida – Dameon Pierce 3-yard run (Chris Howard kick), 12:36
- Florida State – Treshaun Ward 19-yard run (Ryan Fitzgerald kick), 9:46
- Florida state – Ontaria Wilson 8-yard pass from Jordan Travis (Ryan Fitzgerald kick), 0:49

Passing leaders

- FSU – Jordan Travis – 18/29, 202 yards, TD
- FLA – Emory Jones – 16/24, 163 yards, TD

Rushing leaders

- FSU – Jordan Travis – 17 carries, 133 yards, TD
- FLA – Dameon Pierce – 12 carries, 62 yards, TD

Receiving leaders

- FSU – Andrew Parchment – 5 receptions, 53 yards
- FLA – Kemore Gamble – 3 receptions, 80 yards, TD

Tackling leaders

- FSU – Jammie Robinson – 18 tackles
- FLA – Trey Dean, Ty'Ron Hopper – 9 tackles

=== UCF (Gasparilla Bowl) ===
UCF Knights vs. Florida Gators – Game summary

| Quarter | 1 | 2 | 3 | 4 | Total |
|---|---|---|---|---|---|
| UCF | 0 | 9 | 17 | 3 | 29 |
| Florida | 7 | 3 | 7 | 0 | 17 |

at Raymond James Stadium • Tampa, Florida

- Date: December 23, 2021
- Game time: 7:00 p.m. EST
- Game weather: Temperature: 57 °F (14 °C) • Wind: SE at 3 mph (4.8 km/h) • Weather: Sunny
- Game attendance: 63,669
- Referee: Mark Duddy
- TV announcers (ESPN): Wes Durham (play-by-play), Roddy Jones (analyst), Taylor Davis (sideline)
- Boxscore

Game information

First quarter

- Florida – Dameon Pierce 2-yard run (Chris Howard kick), 1:22

Second quarter

- UCF – Isaiah Bowser 3-yard run, 12:29
- UCF – Daniel Obarski 34-yard field goal, 6:16
- Florida – Chris Howard 26-yard field goal, 1:36

Third quarter

- UCF – Isaiah Bowser 4-yard run (Daniel Obarski kick), 10:00
- Florida – Malik Davis 19-yard run (Chris Howard kick), 7:57
- UCF – Daniel Obarski 21-yard field goal, 3:04
- UCF – Ryan O'Keefe 54-yard pass from Mikey Keene (Daniel Obarski kick), 1:08

Fourth quarter

- UCF – Daniel Obarski 33-yard field goal, 2:41

Passing leaders

- UCF – Mikey Keene – 14/22, 144 yards, TD
- FLA – Emory Jones – 14/36, 171 yards

Rushing leaders

- UCF – Isaiah Bowser – 35 carries, 155 yards, 2 TD
- FLA – Malik Davis – 7 carries, 86 yards, TD

Receiving leaders

- UCF – Ryan O'Keefe – 7 receptions, 85 yards, TD
- FLA – Justin Shorter – 3 receptions, 54 yards

Tackling leaders

- UCF – Tatum Bethune and Divaad Wilson – 7 tackles
- FLA – Gervon Dexter – 9 tackles

== Personnel ==
=== Roster ===
As of September 11, 2021

2021 Florida Gators roster
| Quarterbacks: 5 Emory Jones – (redshirt) Junior; 8 Carlos Del Rio-Wilson – Freshman; 11 Jalen Kitna – Freshman; 15 Anthony Richardson – (redshirt) Freshman; Running backs: 6 Nay'Quan Wright – (redshirt) Sophomore; 20 Malik Davis – (redshirt) Senior; 21 Lorenzo Lingard – (redshirt) Junior; 23 Demarkcus Bowman – (redshirt) Freshman; 27 Dameon Pierce – Senior; 38 Carlson Joseph – (redshirt) Freshman; Wide receivers: 0 Ja'Quavion Fraziars – Sophomore; 1 Jacob Copeland – (redshirt) Junior; 3 Xzavier Henderson – Sophomore; 4 Justin Shorter – (redshirt) Junior; 12 Rick Wells – (redshirt) Senior; 14 Trent Whittemore – (redshirt) Sophomore; 81 Daejon Reynolds – Freshman; 82 Ja'Markis Weston – (redshirt) Sophomore; 86 Jordan Pouncey – (redshirt) Senior; 88 Marcus Burke – Freshman; Tight ends: 2 Kemore Gamble – (redshirt) Senior; 9 Keon Zipperer – Junior; 80 Gage Wilcox – Freshman; 84 Nick Elksnis – Freshman; 87 Jonathan Odom – (redshirt) Freshman; Offensive line: 50 Kaleb Boateng – (redshirt) Sophomore; 51 Stewart Reese – Graduate; 54 Gerald Mincey – (redshirt) Freshman; 56 Jean DeLance – (redshirt) Senior; 58 Austin Barber – Freshman; 64 Riley Simonds – (redshirt) Sophomore; 65 Kingsley Eguakun – (redshirt) Sophomore; 66 Jake Slaughter – Freshman; 67 Richie Leonard – (redshirt) Freshman; 70 Michael Tarquin – (redshirt) Sophomore; 72 Josh Braun – Sophomore; 73 Mark Pitts – (redshirt) Freshman; 74 Will Harrod – (redshirt) Sophomore; 76 Richard Gouraige – (redshirt) Junior; 77 Ethan White – Junior; 78 Yousef Mugharbil – Freshman; 79 Hayden Clem – Freshman | Defensive line: 6 Zachary Carter – (redshirt) Senior; 9 Gervon Dexter – Sophomore; 18 Dante Zanders – (redshirt) Junior; 21 Desmond Watson – Freshman; 33 Princely Umanmielen – Sophomore; 44 Daquan Newkirk – (redshirt) Senior; 54 Lamar Goods – (redshirt) Freshman; 55 Antonio Valentino – (redshirt) Senior; 66 Jaelin Humphries – (redshirt) Sophomore; 90 Chris Thomas Jr. – Freshman; 91 Justus Boone – Freshman; 92 Jalen Lee – Sophomore; 94 Tyreak Sapp – Freshman; 95 Tyrone Truesdell – Graduate; 97 Griffin McDowell – (redshirt) Junior; Outside linebackers: 1 Brenton Cox Jr. – (redshirt) Junior; 4 David Reese – (redshirt) Junior; 7 Jeremiah Moon – (redshirt) Senior; 8 Khris Bogle – Junior; 10 Andrew Chatfield Jr. – (redshirt) Junior; 48 Noah Keeter – (redshirt) Sophomore; 52 Antwaun Powell – (redshirt) Freshman; 93 Dylan Meeks – (redshirt) Senior; 99 Lloyd Summerall III – (redshirt) Sophomore; Linebackers: 2 Amari Burney – Senior; 11 Mohamoud Diabate – Junior; 15 Derek Wingo – Sophomore; 17 Scooby Williams – Freshman; 28 Ty'Ron Hopper – (redshirt) Sophomore; 30 Diwun Black – Junior; 34 Lacedrick Brunson – (redshirt) Senior; 36 Chief Borders – Freshman; 51 Ventrell Miller – (redshirt) Senior; Cornerbacks: 3 Jason Marshall Jr. – Freshman; 5 Kaiir Elam – Junior; 23 Jaydon Hill – Junior; 24 Avery Helm – (redshirt) Freshman; 25 Ethan Pouncey – (redshirt) Freshman; 27 Jadarrius Perkins – Junior; 31 Jordan Young – Freshman; 37 Patrick Moorer – (redshirt) Senior; Safeties: 0 Trey Dean – Senior; 13 Donovan McMillon – Freshman; 16 Tre'Vez Johnson – Sophomore; 20 Corey Collier Jr. – Freshman; 22 Rashad Torrence II – Sophomore; 26 Kamar Wilcoxson – (redshirt) Freshman; 32 Mordecai McDaniel – Sophomore; 39 Fenley Graham – (redshirt) Freshman; Defensive backs: 19 Elijah Blades – Graduate; 35 Dakota Mitchell – Freshman; 43 Nicolas Sutton – (redshirt) Senior | Kickers: 47 Jace Christmann – Graduate; 71 Chris Howard – (redshirt) Senior; Punters: 26 Jeremy Crawshaw – (redshirt) Freshman; 40 Jacob Watkins – (redshirt) Senior; Long snappers: 42 Rocco Underwood – Freshman; 45 Marco Ortiz – (redshirt) Junior; Athletes: 13 Kyle Engel – (redshirt) Sophomore; 18 Jack Anders – (redshirt) Sophomore; 22 Kahleil Jackson – (redshirt) Freshman; 29 Khamal Ellison – (redshirt) Senior; 29 Isaac Ricks – (redshirt) Senior; 30 Taylor Spierto – Freshman; 31 Chase DeMichele – (redshirt) Junior; 33 Daniel Cross – (redshirt) Junior; 35 William Sawyer – (redshirt) Sophomore; 36 Cornelius Barnes – Freshman; 37 Tyler Waxman – (redshirt) Sophomore; 38 Cahron Rackley – Freshman; 44 Brandon Becar – (redshirt) Senior; 46 John Brady – (redshirt) Sophomore; 47 Justin Pelic – (redshirt) Sophomore; 49 Adam Mihalek – Freshman; 53 Chase Whitfield – (redshirt) Sophomore; 57 Coleman Crozier – (redshirt) Junior; 83 Joshua Tse – (redshirt) Senior; 85 Kevin Johnson – (redshirt) Junior; 96 Travis Freeman – (redshirt) Sophomore |

- Redshirt
- Injury

== Coaching staff ==
| Name | Position | Joined staff |
|---|---|---|
| Dan Mullen | Head coach (until Nov. 21) | 2018 |
| Greg Knox | Interim head coach (after Nov. 21) / Running backs / special teams coordinator | 2018 |
| Todd Grantham | Defensive coordinator (until Nov. 7) | 2018 |
| Christian Robinson | Interim defensive coordinator (after Nov. 7) / linebackers | 2018 |
| Tim Brewster | Assistant head coach / tight ends | 2020 |
| John Hevesy | Running game coordinator / offensive line | 2018 |
| Billy Gonzales | Passing game coordinator / wide receivers | 2018 |
| Garrick McGee | Quarterbacks | 2020 |
| Wesley McGriff | Secondary | 2021 |
| Jules Montinar | Cornerbacks | 2021 |
| David Turner | Defensive line | 2019 |
| Nick Savage | Director of strength and conditioning | 2018 |

== Players drafted into the NFL ==
| Round | Pick | Player | Position | NFL Club |
|---|---|---|---|---|
| 1 | 23 | Kaiir Elam | CB | Buffalo Bills |
| 3 | 95 | Zachary Carter | DT | Cincinnati Bengals |
| 4 | 107 | Dameon Pierce | RB | Houston Texans |
