= List of Mississippi State Bulldogs head football coaches =

The Mississippi State Bulldogs college football team represents Mississippi State University in the West Division of the Southeastern Conference (SEC). The Bulldogs compete as part of the NCAA Division I Football Bowl Subdivision. The program has had 36 head coaches since it began play during the 1895 season. Since November 2023, Jeff Lebby has served as Mississippi State's head coach.

Twelve coaches have led the Bulldogs in postseason bowl games: Ralph Sasse, Allyn McKeen, Paul E. Davis, Bob Tyler, Emory Bellard, Jackie Sherrill, Sylvester Croom, Dan Mullen, Joe Moorhead, Mike Leach, Zach Arnett, and Lebby. McKeen led the Bulldogs to their lone conference championship as a member of the SEC in 1941.

Sherrill is the leader in seasons coached and games won, with 75 victories during his 13 years with the program. McKeen has the highest winning percentage of those who have coached more than one game, with .764. W.M. Matthews and J.B. Hildebrand have the lowest winning percentage of those who have coached more than one game, with .000. Of the 36 different head coaches who have led the Bulldogs, Bernie Bierman, McKeen and Darrell Royal have been inducted as head coaches into the College Football Hall of Fame in South Bend, Indiana.

== Key ==
Key to symbols in coaches list
General		Overall		Conference		Postseason (Note: Although the first Rose Bowl Game was played in 1902, it has been continuously played since the 1916 game, and is recognized as the oldest bowl game by the NCAA. "—" indicates any season prior to 1916 when postseason games were not played.)	
No.	Order of coaches (Note: A running total of the number of head coaches, with coaches who served separate tenures being counted only once. Interim head coaches are represented with "Int" and are not counted in the running total. "—" indicates the team played but either without a coach or no coach is on record. "X" indicates an interim year without play.)	GC	Games coached	CW	Conference wins	PW	Postseason wins
DC	Division championships	OW	Overall wins	CL	Conference losses	PL	Postseason losses
CC	Conference championships	OL	Overall losses	CT	Conference ties	PT	Postseason ties
NC	National championships	OT	Overall ties (Note: Overtime rules in college football were introduced in 1996, making ties impossible in the period since.)	C%	Conference winning percentage		
†	Elected to the College Football Hall of Fame	O%	Overall winning percentage (Note: When computing the win–loss percentage, a tie counts as half a win and half a loss.)				

== Coaches ==
List of head football coaches showing season(s) coached, overall records, conference records, postseason records, championships and selected awards (Note: Statistics correct as of the end of the 2025 NCAA Division I FBS football season.)
No.	Name	Term (Note: Mississippi State did not field teams between the 1897–1900 seasons and again for the 1943 season due to World War II.)	Season(s)	GC	OW	OL	OT	O%	CW	CL	CT	C%	PW	PL	PT	DC (Note: Divisional champions have advanced to the SEC Championship Game since the institution of divisional play beginning in the 1992 season. Since that time, Mississippi State has competed as a member of the West Division of the SEC.)	CC	NC	Awards
1	W. M. Matthews	1895	1	2	0	2	0	.000	—	—	—	—	—	—	—	—	—	0	—
2	J. B. Hildebrand	1896	1	4	0	4	0	.000	0	2	0	.000	—	—	—	—	0	0	—
3	L. B. Harvey	1901	1	5	2	2	1	0.500	1	2	0	0.333	—	—	—	—	0	0	—
4	L. Gwinn	1902	1	6	1	4	1	0.250	0	4	1	0.100	—	—	—	—	0	0	—
5	Daniel S. Martin	1903–1906	1	24	10	11	3	0.479	5	9	3	0.382	—	—	—	—	0	0	—
6	Fred Furman	1907–1908	2	16	9	7	0	0.563	5	6	0	0.455	—	—	—	—	0	0	—
7	W. D. Chadwick	1909–1913	5	43	29	12	2	0.698	19	12	2	0.606	1	—	—	—	0	0	—
8	Earl C. Hayes	1914–1916	3	25	15	8	2	0.640	10	8	0	0.556	—	—	—	—	0	0	—
9	Stanley L. Robinson	1917–1919	3	21	16	5	0	0.762	11	3	0	0.786	0	0	0	—	0	0	—
10	Fred Holtkamp	1920–1921	2	17	9	7	1	0.559	7	5	1	0.577	0	0	0	—	0	0	—
11	Dudy Noble	1922	1	9	3	4	2	0.444	2	3	0	0.400	0	0	0	—	0	0	—
12	Earl Abell	1923–1924	2	18	10	6	2	0.611	5	3	2	0.545	0	0	0	—	0	0	—
13	Bernie Bierman^{†}	1925–1926	2	17	8	8	1	0.500	3	7	0	0.300	0	0	0	—	0	0	—
14	John W. Hancock	1927–1929	3	24	8	12	4	0.412	3	9	1	0.269	0	0	0	—	0	0	—
15	Chris Cagle	1930	1	9	2	7	0	0.222	2	1	0	0.666	0	0	0	—	0	0	—
16	Ray G. Dauber	1931–1932	2	16	5	11	0	0.313	0	9	0	.000	0	0	0	—	0	0	—
17	Ross McKechnie	1933–1934	2	20	7	12	1	0.375	1	10	1	0.125	0	0	0	—	0	0	—
18	Ralph Sasse	1935–1937	3	32	20	10	2	0.656	8	7	0	0.533	0	1	0	—	0	0	—
19	Spike Nelson	1938	1	10	4	6	0	0.400	1	4	0	0.200	0	0	0	—	0	0	—
20	Allyn McKeen^{†}	1939–1942; 1944–1948	4, 5	87	65	19	3	0.764	29	16	2	0.638	1	0	0	—	1	0	—
21	Arthur Morton	1949–1951	3	27	8	18	1	0.315	5	15	0	0.250	0	0	0	—	0	0	—
22	Murray Warmath	1952–1953	2	19	10	6	3	0.605	6	5	3	0.536	0	0	0	—	0	0	—
23	Darrell Royal^{†}	1954–1955	2	20	12	8	0	0.600	7	7	0	0.500	0	0	0	—	0	0	—
24	Wade Walker	1956–1961	6	56	22	32	2	0.411	8	30	2	0.225	0	0	0	—	0	0	—
25	Paul E. Davis	1962–1966	5	50	20	28	2	0.420	9	22	2	0.303	1	0	0	—	0	0	AP SEC Coach of the Year (1963)
26	Charles Shira	1967–1972	6	63	16	45	2	0.270	5	32	2	0.154	0	0	0	—	0	0	AP SEC Coach of the Year (1970)
27	Bob Tyler (Note: Tyler's record on-the-field in 1975 was six wins and four losses and one tie (6–4–1, 1–4–1 SEC), nine wins and two losses (9–2, 4–2 SEC) in 1976 and five wins and six losses (5–6, 2–4 SEC) in 1977. In May 1978, the NCAA ruled that Mississippi State must forfeit 19 victories due to playing an ineligible player. As a result of this penalty, the official NCAA record for these years are 2–9, 0–11 and 0–11 respectively.)	1973–1978	6	67	21	44	2	0.328	7	30	0	0.189	1	0	0	—	0	0	—
28	Emory Bellard	1979–1985	7	79	37	42	0	0.468	15	27	0	0.357	1	1	0	—	0	0	—
29	Rockey Felker	1986–1990	5	55	21	34	0	0.382	5	28	0	0.151	0	0	0	—	0	0	—
30	Jackie Sherrill	1991–2003	13	152	75	75	2	0.500	43	59	1	0.422	2	4	0	1	0	0	—
31	Sylvester Croom	2004–2008	5	59	21	38	—	0.356	10	30	—	0.250	1	0	—	0	0	0	AP SEC Coach of the Year (2007); SEC Coach of the Year (2007)
32	Dan Mullen	2009–2017	9	115	69	46	—	0.600	33	39	—	0.458	5	2	—	0	0	0	AP SEC Coach of the Year (2014)
Int	Greg Knox	2017	1	1	1	0	—	1.000	0	0	—	—	1	0	—	0	0	0	—
33	Joe Moorhead	2018–2019	2	26	14	12	—	0.538	7	9	—	0.438	0	2	—	0	0	0	—
34	Mike Leach	2020–2022	3	35	19	16	—	0.543	11	14	—	0.440	1	1	—	0	0	0	—
35	Zach Arnett	2022–2023	2	11	5	6	—	0.455	1	6	—	0.143	1	0	—	0	0	0	—
Int	Greg Knox	2023	1	2	1	1	—	0.500	0	1	—	.000	0	0	—	0	0	0	—
36	Jeff Lebby	2024–present	2	25	7	18	—	0.280	1	15	—	0.063	0	1	—	0	0	0	—
