= Jaire Alexander =

American former football player (born 1997)

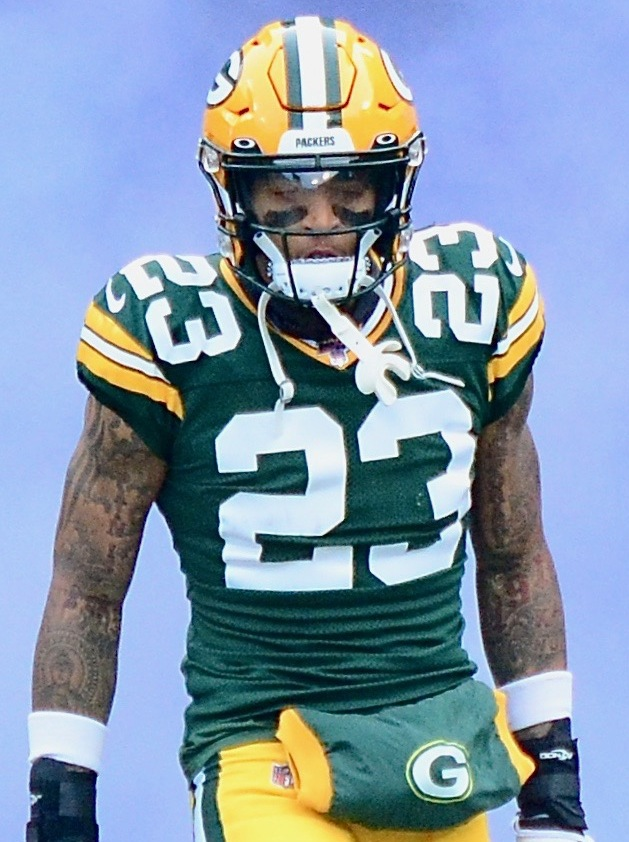
- Alexander with the Green Bay Packers in 2019

No. 23
- Position: Cornerback

Personal information
- Born: February 9, 1997 (age 29); Philadelphia, Pennsylvania, U.S.
- Listed height: 5 ft 10 in (1.78 m)
- Listed weight: 196 lb (89 kg)

Career information
- High school: Rocky River (Mint Hill, North Carolina)
- College: Louisville (2015–2017)
- NFL draft: 2018: 1st round, 18th overall pick

Career history
- Green Bay Packers (2018–2024); Baltimore Ravens (2025); Philadelphia Eagles (2025)

Awards and highlights
- 2× Second-team All-Pro (2020, 2022); 2× Pro Bowl (2020, 2022); PFWA All-Rookie Team (2018); Second team All-ACC (2016)

Career NFL statistics
- Total tackles: 292
- Sacks: 1.5
- Forced fumbles: 3
- Fumble recoveries: 4
- Pass deflections: 70
- Interceptions: 12
- Defensive touchdowns: 1
- Stats at Pro Football Reference

Jaire Zakar Alexander (born February 9, 1997) is an American former professional football player who was a cornerback for eight seasons in the National Football League (NFL). He played college football for the Louisville Cardinals, and was selected by the Green Bay Packers in the first round of the 2018 NFL draft, where he spent seven seasons. He signed with the Baltimore Ravens in 2025 before being traded to the Philadelphia Eagles midseason and announced his retirement from football ten days after being traded.

== Early life ==
Alexander was born in Philadelphia, before moving to the Charlotte area as a toddler. Alexander attended Rocky River High School in Mint Hill, North Carolina. While there, he played high school football for the Ravens. He originally committed to the University of South Carolina to play college football but changed his commitment to the University of Louisville.

== College career ==
Alexander played at Louisville from 2015 to 2017 under head coach Bobby Petrino. During his career, he had 77 tackles and seven interceptions. For the 2016 season, he was named Second-team All-Atlantic Coast Conference. After his junior season in 2017, he decided to forgo his senior year and enter the 2018 NFL draft. He decided not to play in the 2017 TaxSlayer Bowl with the rest of the Louisville team due to persistent injury issues during the season.

== Professional career ==
=== Pre-draft ===
On December 22, 2017, Alexander announced his decision to forgo his remaining eligibility and enter the 2018 NFL Draft. As a result of his decision, he chose not to play in the TaxSlayer Bowl. He attended the NFL Scouting Combine in Indianapolis and completed all of the combine and positional drills. Among cornerbacks, Alexander finished third in the short shuttle, finished fifth in the three-cone drill, finished sixth in the 40-yard dash, and tied for fourth in the broad jump. On March 29, 2018, Alexander participated at Louisville's pro day, but opted to stand on his combine numbers and only performed positional drills. At the conclusion of the pre-draft process, Alexander was projected to be a first-round pick by NFL draft experts and scouts. He was ranked as the top cornerback prospect in the draft by NFL analyst Mike Mayock and was ranked the third best cornerback by DraftScout.com.

External videos
- Jaire Alexander's NFL Combine workout
- Alexander runs a 4.38s 40-yard dash

Pre-draft measurables
Height	Weight	Arm length	Hand span	Wingspan	40-yard dash	10-yard split	20-yard split	20-yard shuttle	Three-cone drill	Vertical jump	Broad jump	Bench press
5 ft 10 1/4 in (1.78 m)	196 lb (89 kg)	31 1/8 in (0.79 m)	9 1/2 in (0.24 m)	6 ft 2 3/4 in (1.90 m)	4.38 s	1.47 s	2.55 s	3.98 s	6.71 s	35 in (0.89 m)	10 ft 7 in (3.23 m)	14 reps
All values are from NFL Combine

External videos
- Packer draft Jaire Alexander 18th overall

=== Green Bay Packers ===
==== 2018 ====
The Green Bay Packers selected Alexander in the first round (18th overall) of the 2018 NFL draft. The Green Bay Packers decided to orchestrate a trade in order to acquire the 18th overall pick from the Seattle Seahawks, and agreed to trade their 2018 first- (27th overall), third- (76th overall), and sixth-round picks (186th overall) to the Seahawks in exchange for the first-round pick (18th overall) the Packers used to draft Alexander and also received a seventh-round pick (248th overall).

On May 15, 2018, the Packers signed Alexander to a fully guaranteed four–year, $12.05 million contract that included an initial signing bonus of $6.84 million.

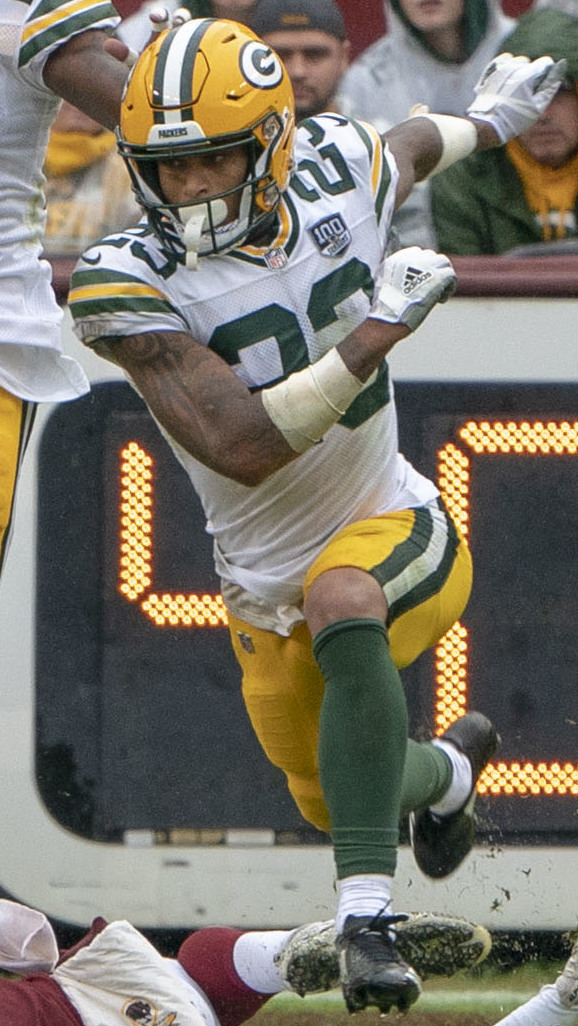
Alexander in 2018

Throughout training camp, Alexander competed to be a starting cornerback against Davon House, Tramon Williams, Kevin King, and Josh Jackson. Head coach Mike McCarthy listed Alexander the fourth cornerback on the depth chart to start the regular season, behind Davon House, Kevin King, and Tramon Williams.

On September 9, 2018, Alexander made his professional regular season debut in the Green Bay Packers' season-opener against the Chicago Bears and recorded three solo tackles during their 24–23 victory. On September 16, 2018, Alexander recorded eight combined tackles and was credited with half a sack during a 29–29 tie with the Minnesota Vikings in a Week 2. During the fourth quarter, Alexander intercepted a pass by Vikings quarterback Kirk Cousins, but the play was negated due to a roughing the passer call on teammate Clay Matthews III. On September 30, 2018, Alexander made one solo tackle, broke up a pass, and made his first career interception off a pass thrown by Bills' quarterback Josh Allen, that was intended for wide receiver Zay Jones, before he sustained an injury and subsequently exited in the fourth quarter of a 22–0 win against the Buffalo Bills. He was diagnosed with a groin injury and was inactive for two games (Weeks 5–6). In Week 8, he produced seven solo tackles and a career-high five pass deflections as the Packers lost 27–25 at the Los Angeles Rams. On December 2, 2018, the Green Bay Packers fired long-time head coach Mike McCarthy after amounting a 4–7–1 record and named offensive coordinator Joe Philbin the interim head coach for the last four games. He was inactive for the Packers' Week 17 loss to the Detroit Lions after reaggravating his groin injury. He finished with a total 66 combined tackles (61 solo), 11 pass deflections, one interception, and was credited with half a sack in 13 games and 11 starts. He was named to the PFWA All-Rookie Team.

==== 2019 ====
On January 8, 2019, the Green Bay Packers announced the official hiring of Tennessee Titans' offensive coordinator Matt LaFleur as the new head coach. During training camp, he competed against Kevin King and Tramon Williams to be the No. 1 starting cornerback following the departures of Davon House and Bashaud Breeland. Defensive coordinator Mike Pettine named Alexander and Kevin King the starting cornerbacks to begin the season.

On October 6, 2019, Alexander made two solo tackles, a season–high three pass deflections, and intercepted a pass thrown by Dak Prescott to wide receiver Amari Cooper during a 34–24 win at the Dallas Cowboys. In Week 15, Alexander recorded a season–high eight solo tackles, made two pass deflections, and intercepted a pass thrown by Mitch Trubisky during a 21–13 win against the Chicago Bears. He started in all 16 regular season games and recorded 51 combined tackles (45 solo), 17 passes defended, two interceptions, and one forced fumble.

The Green Bay Packers finished the 2019 NFL season first in the NFC North with a record of 13–3 and clinched a first-round bye. On January 12, 2020, Alexander started in the first playoff game of his career and recorded nine combined tackles (seven solo) and made one pass deflection as the Packers defeated the Seattle Seahawks 28–23 in the Divisional Round. On January 19, 2020, he was limited to three solo tackles during a 20–37 loss at the San Francisco 49ers in the NFC Championship Game.

==== 2020 ====
He returned as the Packers' No. 1 starting cornerback in 2020 and was again paired with Kevin King. On September 13, 2020, Alexander started in the Green Bay Packers' season–opener at the Minnesota Vikings and recorded five combined tackles (four solo), made his first career solo sack for the first safety of his career, and had his only interception of the season on a pass thrown by Kirk Cousins to Adam Thielen during a 43–34 victory. He had his first career safety early in the second quarter, after blitzing and tackling Kirk Cousins for a four–yard loss in the end–zone. On November 5, 2020, Alexander made a tackle on running back Jamycal Hasty in the second quarter and immediately exited the game while he was evaluated for a concussion as the Packers won 34–17 at the San Francisco 49ers. He was diagnosed with a concussion and remained in concussion protocol as the Packers defeated the Jacksonville Jaguars 24–20 in Week 10. He returned the following week and tied his season–high of six combined tackles (four solo) and had two pass deflections during a 31–34 overtime loss at the Indianapolis Colts in Week 11. In Week 16, he made two combined tackles (one solo) and set a season–high with three pass deflections as the Packers routed the Tennessee Titans 40–14. He finished the season with 51 combined tackles (40 solo), 13 passes defended, one interception, one sack, a forced fumble, and a safety in 15 games and 15 starts. On January 8, 2021, he made the 2020 All-Pro Team second-team and was also named to the Pro Bowl for the first time of his career and was invited to represent the NFC in the 2021 Pro Bowl. He received an overall grade of 90.5 from Pro Football Focus in 2020, which ranked first amongst all qualifying cornerbacks.

The Green Bay Packers finished with a 13–3 record during the 2020 NFL season and repeated finishing first in the NFC North to clinch a first–round bye. On January 16, 2021, Alexander started in the Divisional Round against the Los Angeles Rams and made one solo tackle while becoming the only cornerback since 2006 to end a game with his opponent finishing with negative yards in a playoff game (−3 yards) as the Packers won 32–18. On January 24, 2021, he started in the NFC Championship against the Tampa Bay Buccaneers and made three combined tackles (two solo), led the team with three pass deflections, and also had a team-leading two interceptions on passes thrown by Tom Brady during the Packers' 31–26 loss, eliminating them from the playoffs. He was ranked 41st by his fellow players on the NFL Top 100 Players of 2021.

==== 2021 ====
On February 8, 2021, the Green Bay Packers announced the hiring of Los Angeles Rams' linebackers coach Joe Barry as their new defensive coordinator after they chose not to renew Mike Pettine's contract. On April 30, 2021, the Green Bay Packers exercised the fifth–year option on Alexander's rookie contract, for a one–year contract worth a guaranteed $13.32 million for the 2022 season.

Throughout training camp, he competed to maintain his role as the No. 1 starting cornerback against Kevin King, rookie first-round pick Eric Stokes, and Chandon Sullivan. Head coach Matt LaFleur named him the No. 1 starting cornerback to start the season, alongside Kevin King.

On September 26, 2021, Alexander collected a season–high five combined tackles (four solo), a season–high three pass deflections, and had his only interception of the season on a pass by Jimmy Garoppolo to tight end George Kittle during a 30–28 win at the San Francisco 49ers. The following week, he exited in the first quarter of a 27–17 win against the Pittsburgh Steelers after injuring his shoulder. On October 9, 2021, the Green Bay Packers officially placed him on injured reserve with the hopes he could heal naturally and avoid undergoing surgery and missing the entire season. On December 8, 2021, the Packers announced that Alexander would be designated to return to practice. On December 29, 2021, he was officially removed from injured reserve and returned to the active roster. On January 2, 2022, the Green Bay Packers placed Alexander on the COVID-19/reserve list. On January 7, 2022, he was activated off the COVID-19/reserve list, but would miss the last game of the season as he missed 13 games (Weeks 5–18). He was limited to 13 combined tackles (nine solo), three pass deflections, and one interception in four games and four starts.

The Green Bay Packers finished the 2021 NFL season with a 13–4 record and finished a top the NFC North for the third consecutive season, earning a first-round bye. On January 22, 2022, Alexander appeared in the Packers' 10–13 loss to the San Francisco 49ers in the Divisional Round, but did not record a stat.

==== 2022 ====
On May 18, 2022, the Green Bay Packers signed Alexander to a four–year, $84 million contract extension that included an initial signing bonus of $30 million and would keep him under contract throughout the 2026 NFL season. He entered training camp slated as the No. 1 cornerback. Head coach Matt LaFleur named Alexander and Eric Stokes the starting cornerbacks to begin the season.

On October 30, 2022, Alexander made one tackle, a career–high four pass deflections, and intercepted a pass by Josh Allen to wide receiver Gabriel Davis during a 17–27 loss at the Buffalo Bills. The following week, he had two solo tackles, one pass break-up, and intercepted a pass by Jared Goff for his second consecutive game with an interception during the Packers' 9–15 loss at the Detroit Lions. In Week 10, he collected a season–high nine combined tackles (seven solo) and broke up a pass during a 31–28 overtime win against the Dallas Cowboys. In Week 16, he made four solo tackles, a pass deflection, and set a career–high with his fifth interception of the season on a pass thrown by Tua Tagovailoa to wide receiver Tyreek Hill during a 26–20 win at the Miami Dolphins. On December 19, 2022, he was named to the 2023 Pro Bowl. He finished the 2022 NFL season with a total of 56 combined tackles (43 solo), 14 passes defended, and a career–high five interceptions in 16 appearances and starts. He was ranked 26th by his fellow players on the NFL Top 100 Players of 2023.

==== 2023 ====
Head coach Matt LaFleur named Alexander and Rasul Douglas the starting cornerback duo to begin the regular season. A back injury kept Alexander sidelined for three games (Weeks 3–4, 7). On November 5, 2023, Alexander collected a season–high seven combined tackles (six solo) and a season–high two pass deflections during a 20–3 win against the Los Angeles Rams. He injured his shoulder and was sidelined for six consecutive games (Weeks 10–15). On December 24, 2023, Alexander, who was not designated as a team captain during their Week 16 matchup against the Carolina Panthers, participated in the coin toss, called the toss, and incorrectly told the referee he elected for the Packers to be on defense, potentially forcing Green Bay to kick off. A captain may only select to receive or kick, which goal to defend, or, in the absence of a choice, defer to choose in the second half. The Green Bay Packers suspended him for conduct detrimental to the team and missed their Week 17 win at the Minnesota Vikings. He finished the season with only 27 combined tackles (23 solo) and five pass deflections in seven games and seven starts.

The Green Bay Packers finished the 2023 NFL season second in the NFC North with a 9–8 record and received a Wildcard berth. On January 14, 2024, Alexander started in the NFC Wildcard Game and made seven combined tackles (three solo), one pass deflection, and intercepted a pass thrown by Dak Prescott to wide receiver Brandin Cooks during a 48–32 win at the Dallas Cowboys. The following week, he recorded five combined tackles (four solo) as the Packers lost the Divisional Game 21–24 at the San Francisco 49ers.

==== 2024 ====
On January 31, 2024, the Green Bay Packers hired former Boston College head coach Jeff Hafley as their new defensive coordinator, after firing Joe Barry. Hafley retained Alexander and Eric Stokes as the starting cornerbacks to start the season.

On September 6, 2024, Alexander started in the Green Bay Packers' season-opener at the Philadelphia Eagles and recorded four solo tackles, a season-high two pass deflections, and intercepted a pass by Jalen Hurts to A. J. Brown during a 29–34 loss. On September 22, 2024, he collected a season-high five combined tackles (four solo), broke up a pass, and returned an interception thrown by Will Levis to wide receiver DeAndre Hopkins 34–yards for his first career touchdown during the first quarter of a 30–14 win at the Tennessee Titans. He injured his quadriceps and missed two games (Weeks 4–5). In Week 8, he made one solo tackle and two pass deflections before exiting a 30–27 win at the Jacksonville Jaguars after suffering a knee injury in the closing minutes of the game. It was revealed that Alexander had injured his posterior cruciate ligament and he subsequently missed a Week 9 loss to the Detroit Lions. He would go on to play 10 snaps in their Week 11 matchup against the Chicago Bears but exited and would not return for the rest of the game. After practicing on and off for a month and a half, head coach Matt LaFleur said that Alexander had swelling in his knee and he subsequently missed the last seven consecutive games of the season (Weeks 11–18). On January 1, 2025, it was announced that Alexander had undergone an arthroscopic surgery on his knee, likely ending his season. On January 4, 2025, the Green Bay Packers officially placed him on injured reserve. He finished the 2024 NFL season with only 16 combined tackles (15 solo), seven pass deflections, two interceptions, a fumble recovery, and a touchdown in seven games and seven starts. He received an overall grade of 75.2 from Pro Football Focus, which ranked 24th among 223 qualifying cornerbacks in 2024.

On June 9, 2025, the Green Bay Packers released Alexander.

=== Baltimore Ravens ===
On June 18, 2025, Alexander signed a one-year deal with the Baltimore Ravens worth up to $6 million including incentives. Alexander appeared in only two games with the Ravens designating him as a healthy inactive for five games.

=== Philadelphia Eagles ===
On November 1, 2025, the Ravens traded Alexander along with a 2027 seventh-round pick to the Philadelphia Eagles in exchange for a 2026 sixth-round pick. On November 11, Alexander announced he would be stepping away from football to focus on his physical and mental health. He was placed on the reserve/retired list the following day.

== Career statistics ==
=== NFL ===
==== Regular season ====
Year	Team	Games		Tackles					Interceptions						Fumbles	
Year	Team	GP	GS	Cmb	Solo	Ast	Sck	Sfty	PD	Int	Yds	Avg	Lng	TD	FF	FR
2018	GB	13	11	66	61	5	0.5	0	11	1	27	27.0	27	0	0	2
2019	GB	16	16	58	50	8	0.0	0	17	2	37	18.5	37	0	1	1
2020	GB	15	15	51	40	11	1.0	1	13	1	−4	−4.0	−4	0	1	0
2021	GB	4	4	13	9	4	0.0	0	3	1	30	30.0	30	0	0	0
2022	GB	16	16	56	43	13	0.0	0	14	5	59	11.8	29	0	0	0
2023	GB	7	7	27	23	4	0.0	0	5	0	–	–	–	–	1	0
2024	GB	7	7	16	15	1	0.0	0	7	2	52	26.0	35	1	0	1
2025	BAL	2	0	5	4	1	0.0	0	0	0	–	–	–	–	0	0
2025	PHI	0	0	DNP												
Career		80	76	292	245	47	1.5	1	70	12	201	16.8	37	1	3	4

==== Postseason ====
Year	Team	Games		Tackles				Interceptions						Fumbles	
Year	Team	GP	GS	Cmb	Solo	Ast	Sck	PD	Int	Yds	Avg	Lng	TDs	FF	FR
2019	GB	2	2	12	10	2	0.0	1	0	–	–	–	–	0	0
2020	GB	2	2	4	3	1	0.0	3	2	16	8.0	16	0	0	0
2021	GB	1	0	0	–	–	–	0	0	–	–	–	–	0	0
2023	GB	2	2	12	7	5	0.0	1	1	0	0.0	0	0	0	0
2024	GB	0	0	Did not play due to injury											
Career		7	6	28	20	8	0.0	5	3	16	5.3	16	0	0	0

=== College ===
Season	GP	Tackles					Interceptions					Fumbles	
Season	GP	Solo	Ast	Cmb	TfL	Sck	Int	Yds	Avg	TD	PD	FR	FF
2015	10	14	5	19	0.0	0.0	1	5	5.0	0	2	0	0
2016	13	31	8	39	1.0	0.0	5	37	7.4	0	9	1	1
2017	6	30	6	19	1.0	0.0	1	0	0.0	0	4	0	0
Career	29	58	19	77	2.0	0.0	7	42	6.0	0	15	1	1
Source: sports-reference.com
