= 2017 Mississippi State Bulldogs football team =

American college football season

2017 Mississippi State Bulldogs football

TaxSlayer Bowl champion

TaxSlayer Bowl, W 31–27 vs. Louisville
- Conference: Southeastern Conference
- Western Division

Ranking
- Coaches: No. 20
- AP: No. 19
- Record: 9–4 (4–4 SEC)
- Head coach: Dan Mullen (9th season; regular season); Greg Knox (interim; bowl game)
- Co-offensive coordinators: Billy Gonzales (4th season); John Hevesy (4th season)
- Offensive scheme: Spread
- Defensive coordinator: Todd Grantham (1st season)
- Base defense: 3–4
- Home stadium: Davis Wade Stadium (Capacity: 61,337)

2017 Southeastern Conference football standings
	Conf.			Overall
Team	W		L	W		L
Eastern Division
No. 2 Georgia x$^	7	–	1	13	–	2
South Carolina	5	–	3	9	–	4
Kentucky	4	–	4	7	–	6
Missouri	4	–	4	7	–	6
Florida	3	–	5	4	–	7
Vanderbilt	1	–	7	5	–	7
Tennessee	0	–	8	4	–	8
Western Division
No. 10 Auburn xy	7	–	1	10	–	4
No. 1 Alabama x#^	7	–	1	13	–	1
No. 18 LSU	6	–	2	9	–	4
No. 19 Mississippi State	4	–	4	9	–	4
Texas A&M	4	–	4	7	–	6
Ole Miss*	3	–	5	6	–	6
Arkansas	1	–	7	4	–	8
Championship: Georgia 28, Auburn 7
# – College Football Playoff champion; ^ – College Football Playoff participant; $ – Conference champion; x – Division champion/co-champions; y – Championship game participant; * Ole Miss ineligible for postseason due to NCAA sanctions; Rankings from AP Poll

The 2017 Mississippi State Bulldogs football team represented Mississippi State University in the 2017 NCAA Division I FBS football season. The Bulldogs played their home games at Davis Wade Stadium in Starkville, Mississippi and competed in the Western Division of the Southeastern Conference (SEC). They were led by ninth-year head coach Dan Mullen. They finished the season 9–4, 4–4 in SEC play to finish in a tie for fourth place in the Western Division. They were invited to the TaxSlayer Bowl where they beat Louisville.

Head coach Dan Mullen resigned at the end of the regular season to become the head coach at Florida. Running backs coach Greg Knox served as interim head coach for the TaxSlayer Bowl. On November 28, Penn State offensive coordinator Joe Moorhead was hired as their new head coach, beginning in the 2018 season.

== Rankings ==
Ranking movements Legend: ██ Increase in ranking ██ Decrease in ranking — = Not ranked RV = Received votes
	Week															
Poll	Pre	1	2	3	4	5	6	7	8	9	10	11	12	13	14	Final
AP	—	RV	RV	17	24	—	—	RV	RV	21	18	17	16	24	24	19
Coaches	RV	RV	RV	19	24	RV	RV	RV	RV	22	18	19	17	24	23	20
CFP	Not released									16	16	16	14	23	23	Not released

== Schedule ==
Mississippi State announced its 2017 football schedule on September 13, 2016. The 2017 schedule consists of 7 home and 5 away games in the regular season. The Bulldogs will host SEC foes Alabama, Kentucky, LSU, and Ole Miss, and will travel to Arkansas, Auburn, Georgia, and Texas A&M.

The Bulldogs will host three of the four non-conference opponents, BYU, UMass both are football independent schools and Charleston Southern from the Big South Conference and travel to Louisiana Tech of Conference USA.

Date	Time	Opponent	Rank	Site	TV	Result	Attendance
September 2	3:00 p.m.	No. 14 (FCS) Charleston Southern*		Davis Wade Stadium; Starkville, MS	SECN	W 49–0	54,215
September 9	6:30 p.m.	at Louisiana Tech*		Joe Aillet Stadium; Ruston, LA	CBSSN	W 57–21	28,100
September 16	6:00 p.m.	No. 12 LSU		Davis Wade Stadium; Starkville, MS (rivalry)	ESPN	W 37–7	60,596
September 23	6:00 p.m.	at No. 11 Georgia	No. 17	Sanford Stadium; Athens, GA	ESPN	L 3–31	92,746
September 30	5:00 p.m.	at No. 13 Auburn	No. 24	Jordan–Hare Stadium; Auburn, AL	ESPN	L 10–49	86,901
October 14	11:00 a.m.	BYU*		Davis Wade Stadium; Starkville, MS	SECN	W 35–10	54,866
October 21	3:00 p.m.	Kentucky^{†}		Davis Wade Stadium; Starkville, MS	SECN	W 45–7	58,963
October 28	6:15 p.m.	at Texas A&M		Kyle Field; College Station, TX	ESPN	W 35–14	96,128
November 4	11:00 a.m.	UMass*	No. 16	Davis Wade Stadium; Starkville, MS	SECN	W 34–23	57,374
November 11	6:00 p.m.	No. 2 Alabama	No. 16	Davis Wade Stadium; Starkville, MS (rivalry)	ESPN	L 24–31	61,344
November 18	11:00 a.m.	at Arkansas	No. 16	Donald W. Reynolds Razorback Stadium; Fayetteville, AR	CBS	W 28–21	64,153
November 23	6:30 p.m.	Ole Miss	No. 14	Davis Wade Stadium; Starkville, MS (Egg Bowl)	ESPN	L 28–31	59,345
December 30	11:00 a.m.	vs. Louisville*	No. 23	EverBank Field; Jacksonville, FL (TaxSlayer Bowl)	ESPN	W 31–27	41,310
*Non-conference game; ^{†}Homecoming; Rankings from AP Poll and CFP Rankings after October 31 released prior to game; All times are in Central time

Schedule source:

== Game summaries ==
=== Charleston Southern ===
	1	2	3	4	Total
No. 14 (FCS) Buccaneers	0	0	0	0	0
Bulldogs	23	12	7	7	49

=== At Louisiana Tech ===
	1	2	3	4	Total
MSU Bulldogs	16	20	21	0	57
LTU Bulldogs	9	5	0	7	21

=== LSU ===
	1	2	3	4	Total
No.12 Tigers	0	7	0	0	7
Bulldogs	0	17	13	7	37

=== At Georgia ===
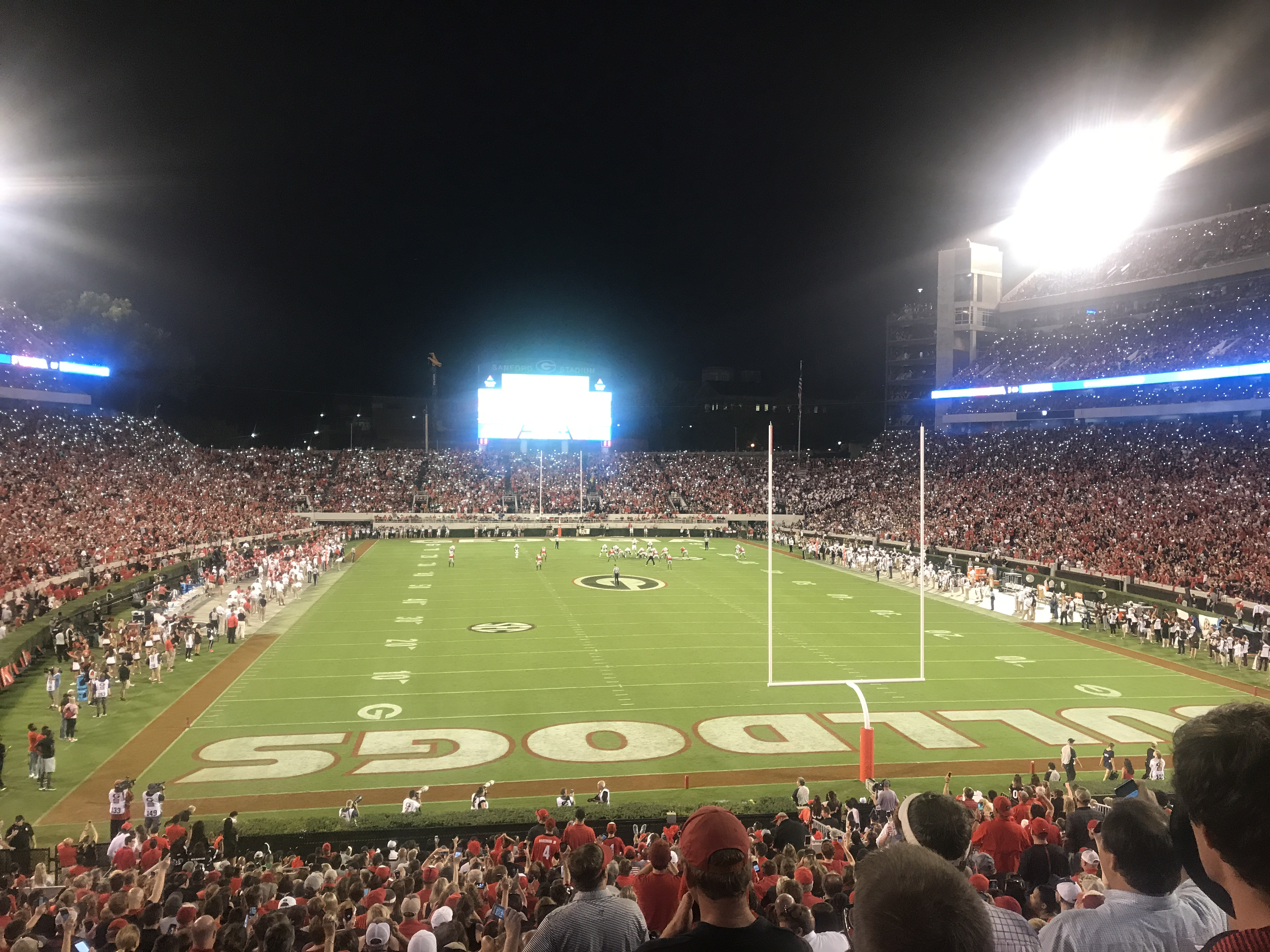
Georgia vs Mississippi State, September 23, 2017

	1	2	3	4	Total
No.17 MSU Bulldogs	0	3	0	0	3
No.11 UGA Bulldogs	14	0	17	0	31

=== At Auburn ===
	1	2	3	4	Total
No. 24 Bulldogs	3	7	0	0	10
No. 13 Tigers	14	7	7	21	49

=== BYU ===
	1	2	3	4	Total
Cougars	0	3	7	0	10
Bulldogs	7	14	7	7	35

=== Kentucky ===
	1	2	3	4	Total
Wildcats	0	7	0	0	7
Bulldogs	7	10	7	21	45

=== At Texas A&M ===
	1	2	3	4	Total
Bulldogs	7	7	14	7	35
Aggies	0	0	7	7	14

=== UMass ===
	1	2	3	4	Total
Minutemen	3	17	0	3	23
Bulldogs	10	3	14	7	34

=== Alabama ===
	1	2	3	4	Total
No. 1 Crimson Tide	7	7	3	14	31
Bulldogs	7	7	7	3	24

=== At Arkansas ===
	1	2	3	4	Total
Bulldogs	0	14	0	14	28
Razorbacks	14	0	7	0	21

=== Ole Miss ===
	1	2	3	4	Total
Rebels	7	3	14	7	31
Bulldogs	0	6	0	22	28

=== vs Louisville–TaxSlayer Bowl ===
	1	2	3	4	Total
Cardinals	7	14	3	3	27
Bulldogs	14	3	0	14	31
