= Billy Gonzales =

American football player and coach (born 1971)

Current position
- Title: Analyst
- Team: Texas
- Conference: SEC

Biographical details
- Born: July 18, 1971 (age 55); Thornton, Colorado, U.S.

Playing career
- 1989–1992: Colorado State
- Position: Wide receiver

Coaching career (HC unless noted)
- 1994: MacMurray (WR)
- 1995–2001: Kent State (WR/RB)
- 2001–2002: Bowling Green (WR)
- 2003–2004: Utah (STC/WR)
- 2005–2007: Florida (WR)
- 2008–2009: Florida (RC/WR)
- 2010–2011: LSU (PGC/WR)
- 2012: Illinois (co-OC/WR)
- 2013: Mississippi State (WR)
- 2014–2017: Mississippi State (co-OC/WR)
- 2018–2019: Florida (co-OC/WR)
- 2020–2021: Florida (PGC/WR)
- 2022: Florida Atlantic (WR)
- 2023–2025: Florida (WR)
- 2025: Florida (interim HC/WR)
- 2026–present: Texas (OA)

Billy Gonzales (born July 18, 1971) is an American college football coach and former player who is serving as an offensive analyst for the Texas Longhorns. He was most recently the interim head coach and wide receivers coach at the University of Florida. He played wide receiver at Colorado State University from 1990 to 1994.

== Playing career ==
In 1989, Gonzales joined the Colorado State football team. He played for former Ohio State coach Earle Bruce. While he was there, he was mainly a returner, returning 24 punts for 265 yards in 1990 and 16 punts for 330 yards in 1991.

== Coaching career ==
After his playing career, Gonzales started his coaching career at small Division-III MacMurray as their wide receivers coach, which he has coached his entire career. He moved on to Kent State in the same role.

Gonzales stayed in the Mid-American Conference for his next role at Bowling Green under Urban Meyer, where he met Dan Mullen and John Hevesy, two assistant coaches who Gonzales would coach with many times throughout his career. He moved on to Utah in 2003 with Meyer, Mullen, and Hevesy. He moved with them again to Florida in 2005. After three years as the wide receivers coach, he was promoted to recruiting coordinator in 2008.

Gonzales moved on from Florida in 2010 to serve as LSU's passing game coordinator and wide receivers coach under Les Miles. Under his guidance, Rueben Randle had 53 catches for 917 yards in 2011.

In 2012, Gonzales became the co-offensive coordinator at Illinois. His offense was an abysmal 122nd out of 124th in total offense, which led to him leaving for Mississippi State, reuniting with Mullen and Hevesy. He was promoted to co-offensive coordinator prior to the 2014. His offense was 17th, 33rd, 56th, and 41st in total offense from 2014–2017. He went with Mullen and Hevesy to Florida in 2018 in the same role.

In 2022, after Florida head coach Dan Mullen was fired, Gonzales joined Willie Taggart's staff at Florida Atlantic University (FAU) as a wide receivers coach. He returned to Florida before the 2023 season.

Gonzales was named interim head coach of the Gators during the 2025 season after Billy Napier was fired.

== Head coaching record ==
Year	Team	Overall	Conference	Standing	Bowl/playoffs
Florida Gators (Southeastern Conference) (2025)
2025	Florida	1–4	0–4	T–11th (Note: Gonzalez replaced Billy Napier with five games remaining)	
Florida:		1–4	0–4		
Total:		1–4			
