= 2017 Louisville Cardinals football team =

American college football season

2017 Louisville Cardinals football

TaxSlayer Bowl, L 27–31 vs. Mississippi State
- Conference: Atlantic Coast Conference
- Atlantic Division
- Record: 8–5 (4–4 ACC)
- Head coach: Bobby Petrino (8th season)
- Co-offensive coordinators: Lonnie Galloway (2nd season); Mike Summers (1st season)
- Offensive scheme: Multiple
- Defensive coordinator: Peter Sirmon (1st season)
- Base defense: 3–4
- Home stadium: Papa John's Cardinal Stadium

Uniform
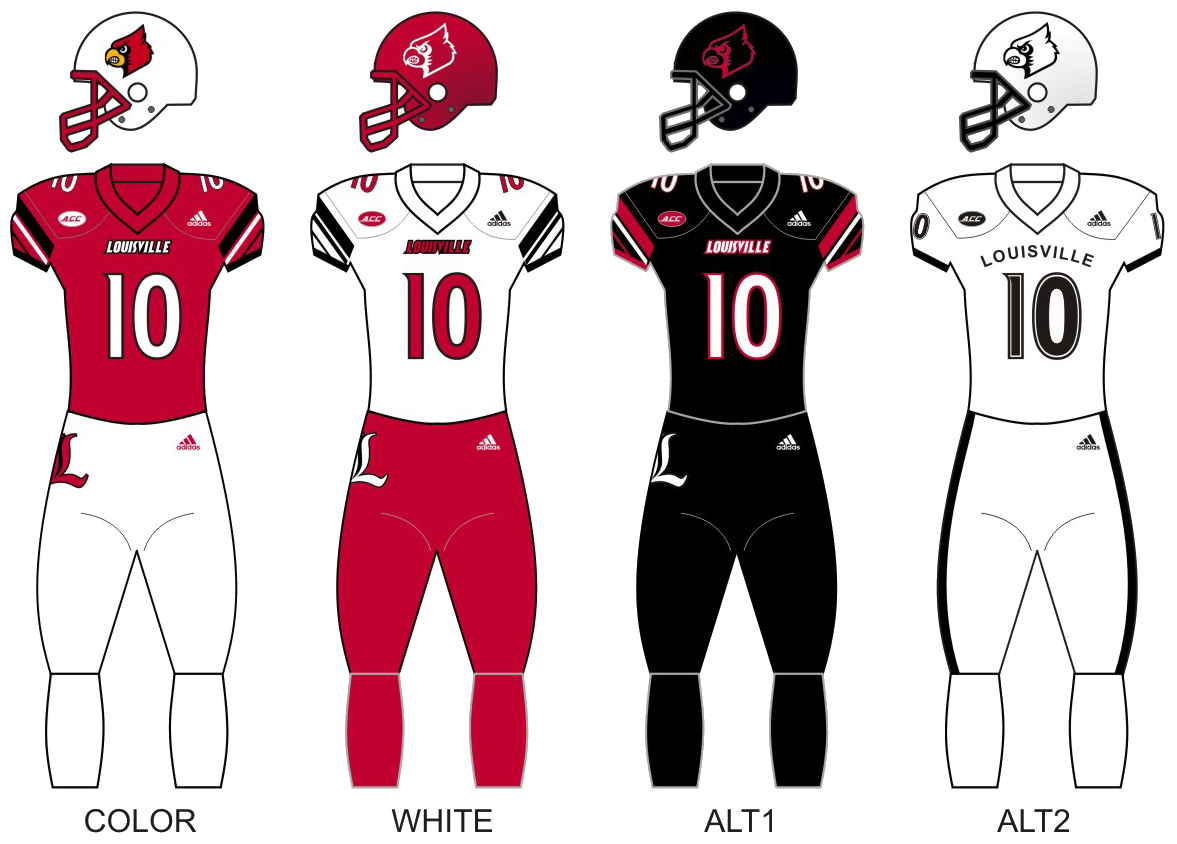

2017 Atlantic Coast Conference football standings
	Conf.			Overall
Team	W		L	W		L
Atlantic Division
No. 4 Clemson xy$^	7	–	1	12	–	2
No. 23 NC State	6	–	2	9	–	4
Wake Forest	4	–	4	8	–	5
Louisville	4	–	4	8	–	5
Boston College	4	–	4	7	–	6
Florida State	3	–	5	7	–	6
Syracuse	2	–	6	4	–	8
Coastal Division
No. 13 Miami (FL) xy	7	–	1	10	–	3
No. 24 Virginia Tech	5	–	3	9	–	4
Georgia Tech	4	–	4	5	–	6
Virginia	3	–	5	6	–	7
Pittsburgh	3	–	5	5	–	7
Duke	3	–	5	7	–	6
North Carolina	1	–	7	3	–	9
Championship: Clemson 38, Miami 3
^ – College Football Playoff participant; $ – Conference champion; x – Division champion/co-champions; y – Championship game participant; Rankings from AP Poll

The 2017 Louisville Cardinals football team represented the University of Louisville in the sport of American football during the 2017 NCAA Division I FBS football season. The Cardinals competed in the Atlantic Division of the Atlantic Coast Conference and were led by fourth-year head coach Bobby Petrino, who began his second stint at Louisville in 2014 after eight years away. Home games were played at Papa John's Cardinal Stadium in Louisville, Kentucky. The team finished the season with an 8–5 overall record and a 4–4 record against opponents in ACC. The Cardinals were in a three-way tie for third place in the Atlantic Division and were invited to the TaxSlayer Bowl, where they lost 31–27 to Mississippi State.

== Schedule ==
Date	Time	Opponent	Rank	Site	TV	Result	Attendance
September 2	7:30 p.m.	vs. Purdue*	No. 16	Lucas Oil Stadium; Indianapolis, IN (Ally Classic)	FOX	W 35–28	37,394
September 9	12:00 p.m.	at North Carolina	No. 17	Kenan Memorial Stadium; Chapel Hill, NC	ESPN	W 47–35	47,000
September 16	8:00 p.m.	No. 3 Clemson	No. 14	Papa John's Cardinal Stadium; Louisville, KY (College GameDay)	ABC	L 21–47	55,588
September 23	12:00 p.m.	Kent State*	No. 19	Papa John's Cardinal Stadium; Louisville, KY	ACCRSN	W 42–3	47,812
September 30	3:30 p.m.	Murray State*	No. 17	Papa John's Cardinal Stadium; Louisville, KY	ACCRSN	W 55–10	47,826
October 5	8:00 p.m.	at No. 24 NC State	No. 17	Carter–Finley Stadium; Raleigh, NC	ESPN	L 25–39	56,107
October 14	12:20 p.m	Boston College^{†}		Papa John's Cardinal Stadium; Louisville, KY	ACCN	L 42–45	44,679
October 21	12:00 p.m.	at Florida State		Doak Campbell Stadium; Tallahassee, FL	ESPN	W 31–28	72,764
October 28	12:20 p.m.	at Wake Forest		BB&T Field; Winston-Salem, NC	ACCN	L 32–42	29,593
November 11	3:30 p.m.	Virginia		Papa John's Cardinal Stadium; Louisville, KY	ESPNU	W 38–21	46,787
November 18	3:30 p.m.	Syracuse		Papa John's Cardinal Stadium; Louisville, KY	ESPNU	W 56–10	34,265
November 25	12:00 p.m.	at Kentucky*		Kroger Field; Lexington, KY (rivalry)	SECN	W 44–17	56,186
December 30	12:00 p.m.	vs. No. 24 Mississippi State*		EverBank Field; Jacksonville, FL (TaxSlayer Bowl)	ESPN	L 27–31	41,310
*Non-conference game; ^{†}Homecoming; Rankings from AP Poll released prior to the game; All times are in Eastern time

== Game summaries ==
=== vs Purdue ===
	1	2	3	4	Total
No. 16 Cardinals	7	3	15	10	35
Boilermakers	7	7	7	7	28

=== At North Carolina ===
	1	2	3	4	Total
No. 17 Cardinals	10	10	7	20	47
Tar Heels	7	7	14	7	35

=== Clemson ===
	1	2	3	4	Total
No. 3 Tigers	7	12	14	14	47
No. 14 Cardinals	7	0	0	14	21

=== Kent State ===
	1	2	3	4	Total
Golden Flashes	0	3	0	0	3
No. 19 Cardinals	21	7	14	0	42

=== Murray State ===
	1	2	3	4	Total
Racers	3	0	7	0	10
No. 17 Cardinals	14	21	10	10	55

=== At NC State ===
	1	2	3	4	Total
No. 17 Cardinals	0	10	3	12	25
No. 24 Wolfpack	0	17	7	15	39

=== Boston College ===
	1	2	3	4	Total
Eagles	7	7	14	17	45
Cardinals	14	7	0	21	42

=== At Florida State ===
	1	2	3	4	Total
Cardinals	7	7	14	3	31
Seminoles	7	7	0	14	28

=== At Wake Forest ===
	1	2	3	4	Total
Cardinals	3	7	7	15	32
Demon Deacons	14	14	7	7	42

=== Virginia ===
	1	2	3	4	Total
Cavaliers	7	7	0	7	21
Cardinals	7	10	14	7	38

=== Syracuse ===
	1	2	3	4	Total
Orange	3	0	0	7	10
Cardinals	7	28	14	7	56

=== At Kentucky ===
	1	2	3	4	Total
Cardinals	17	14	3	10	44
Wildcats	7	3	0	7	17

=== vs Mississippi State–Tax Slayer Bowl ===
	1	2	3	4	Total
Cardinals	7	14	3	3	27
Bulldogs	14	3	0	14	31

== Rankings ==
Ranking movements Legend: ██ Increase in ranking ██ Decrease in ranking — = Not ranked RV = Received votes
	Week															
Poll	Pre	1	2	3	4	5	6	7	8	9	10	11	12	13	14	Final
AP	16	17	14	19	17	17	RV	—	—	—	—	—	—	RV	RV	—
Coaches	17	16	14	20	18	17	RV	—	—	—	—	—	—	RV	RV	—
CFP	Not released									—	—	—	—	—	—	Not released

== Roster ==
2017 Louisville Cardinals football team roster
Players
Coaches
Offense

Pos.	#	Name	Class
WR	1	Traveon Samuel	Jr
WR	2	Corey Reed	Fr
QB	3	Malik Cunningham	Fr
WR	3	Cornelius Sturghill	So
QB	4	Jawon Pass	Fr
WR	5	Seth Dawkins	So
RB	7	Reggie Bonnafon	Sr
QB	8	Lamar Jackson	Jr
WR	9	Jaylen Smith	Jr
WR	10	Rodjay Burns	So
TE	11	Kemari Averett	Fr
RB	12	Trey Smith	So
QB	15	Clay Bolin	Fr
QB	15	Sean McCormack	Fr
WR	18	Justin Marshall	Fr
RB	22	Harry Trotter	So
WR	23	Jovel Smith	So
RB	25	Dae Williams	So
WR	26	Chris Taylor-Yamanoha	Fr
WR	27	Collin Miller	Fr
RB	29	Malik Williams	Sr
WR	30	Jeffrey Banks	So
WR	31	Jack Duane	Sr
RB	33	Colin Wilson	Fr
RB	34	Jeremy Smith	Sr
RB	36	Maurice Burkley	Fr
FB	38	Vince Lococo	Fr
TE	42	Tyler Polston	Sr
RB	43	Jovan Smith	Fr
FB	49	Tobias Little	So
OL	60	Tyler Haycraft	Jr
OL	61	Caleb Chandler	Fr
OL	63	Nate Scheler	Jr
OL	65	Ronald Rudd	Jr
OL	66	Cole Bentley	Fr
OL	67	Thomas Nauert	Jr
OL	68	Danny Burns	Jr
OL	69	Chaz Ray	Jr
OL	70	Toriano Roundtrree	Jr
OL	71	Toryque Bateman	Fr
OL	72	Lukayus McNeil	Jr
OL	73	Mekhi Becton	Fr
OL	74	Geron Christian	Jr
OL	75	Robbie Bell	Fr
OL	77	Linwood Foy	Jr
OL	78	Max Martin	Fr
OL	79	Kenny Thomas	Jr
TE	80	Charles Stanberry	Sr
WR	81	Emonee Spence	So
WR	82	Keion Wakefield	Fr
TE	83	Micky Crum	Jr
WR	84	Josh Johnson	Fr
TE	85	Jordan Davis	So
WR	86	Devantee Peete	Jr
WR	87	Dez Fitzpatrick	Fr
WR	88	Javonte Bagley	Sr
WR	89	Jordan Thomas	Fr

Defense

Pos.	#	Name	Class
CB	1	P. J. Mbanasor	So
S	4	TreSean Smith	Fr
CB	5	Russ Yeast	Fr
S	9	C. J. Avery	Fr
CB	10	Jaire Alexander	Jr
CB	10	Rodjay Burns	So
S	11	Dee Smith	Jr
S	12	Rodney Owens	Fr
S	13	P. J. Blue	Fr
DL	14	Drew Bailey	Sr
CB	15	Trumaine Washington	Sr
LB	17	Dorian Etheridge	Fr
CB	20	Ronald Walker	Sr
LB	21	London Iakopo	Jr
S	22	Chucky Williams	Sr
S	23	Lyn Strange	Fr
DB	24	Zykiese Cannon	Sr
CB	27	Anthonoy Johnson	Fr
LB	31	Malik Staples	So
LB	32	Stacy Thomas	Sr
DB	35	Lamarques Thomas	So
S	38	Jack Fagot	Fr
CB	39	Aaron Floyd	Jr
S	40	Kaheem Roach	Fr
LB	42	Issac Stewart	Jr
LB	43	Damien Smith	So
LB	48	Colin Demetrakis	Fr
DL	49	Boosie Whitlow	So
DL	50	Jacob Pierce	Fr
LB	53	Amonte Caban	So
LB	55	Isaac Martin	Fr
LB	56	Kam Jones	Fr
DE	57	Dayna Overton	Fr
LB	58	Jon Greenard	So
DL	59	Caleb Tillman	Fr
DL	62	Derek Dorsey	Fr
DL	64	Tyler Robertson	So
LB	76	Luke Massad	So
DE	90	De'Asian Richardson	Sr
LB	91	Trevon Young	Sr
LB	92	Malik Clark	Fr
LB	93	Gary McCrae	Jr
DT	94	G. G. Robinson	So
DL	96	Henry Famurewa	Jr
LB	97	Nick Okeke	Fr
LB	98	Tabarius Peterson	Fr
LB	99	James Hearns	Sr

Special teams

Pos.	#	Name	Class
P	28	Mason King	So
K	36	Evan O'Hara	So
LS	41	Ryan Betlach	Sr
K	45	Blanton Creque	So
LS	46	Brendan Lowery	So
P	47	Austin Johnson	Fr
LS	52	Mitch Hall	Fr

Head coach

- Bobby Petrino

Coordinators/assistant coaches

- Lorenzo Ward (Associate head coach/secondary)
- Lonnie Galloway (Co-offensive coordinator/wide receivers)
- Mike Summers (Co-offensive coordinator/offensive line)
- Peter Sirmon (defensive coordinator)
- Cort Dennison (Inside Linebackers/recruiting coordinator)
- Chris Klenakis (Tight Ends)
- Nick Petrino (quarterbacks)
- L. D. Scott (defensive line)
- Kolby Smith (running backs)

Legend

- (C) Team captain
- (S) Suspended
- (I) Ineligible
- Injured
- Redshirt

Roster
Last update: October 2, 2017

== 2018 NFL draft ==
The Cardinals had four players selected in the 2018 NFL draft.

Player	Team	Round	Pick #	Position
Jaire Alexander	Green Bay Packers	1st	18th	CB
Lamar Jackson	Baltimore Ravens	1st	32nd	QB
Geron Christian	Washington Redskins	3rd	74th	OT
Trevon Young	Los Angeles Rams	6th	205th	DE
