= John Hevesy =

American football player and coach (born 1971)

Biographical details
- Born: May 2, 1971 (age 55); Madison, Connecticut, U.S.

Playing career
- 1991–1993: Maine
- Position: Offensive tackle

Coaching career (HC unless noted)
- 1994–1995: Trinity (OL)
- 1996: Brown (TE/OT)
- 1997: Syracuse (GA)
- 1998–2000: Brown (OL)
- 2001–2002: Bowling Green (TE/OT)
- 2003–2004: Utah (OL)
- 2005–2007: Florida (AOL)
- 2008: Florida (TE/AOL)
- 2009–2013: Mississippi State (RGC/OL)
- 2014–2017: Mississippi State (co-OC/RGC/OL)
- 2018–2019: Florida (co-OC/OL)
- 2020–2021: Florida (RGC/OL)

Accomplishments and honors

Championships
- 2× BCS National Champion (2006, 2008)

John Hevesy (born May 2, 1971) is an American football coach and former player. A Dan Mullen protégé, he had been a coach under him and with him since 2001. He was most recently the running game coordinator at Florida.

== Playing career ==
Hevesy played high school football at Daniel Hand High School in Connecticut. He played college football at Maine under Jack Cosgrove where he was a three-year starter from 1991 to 1993.

== Coaching career ==
After Hevesy's junior year at Maine, he spent the summer with the Hand High School football team. Then-Hand baseball coach Steve Filippone saw Hevesy hanging around during the team's practices and told him that his interest in watching and assisting the team could lead him to becoming a future coach.

He started his coaching career at Division—III Trinity as their offensive line coach. He had two stints at Brown as an offensive line coach and tight ends coach and a graduate assistant job at Syracuse before 2001.

In 2001, he was hired by Urban Meyer to be the offensive line coach at Bowling Green. This was his first stint with Meyer, Dan Mullen, and Billy Gonzales. He would be with Meyer from 2001 to 2008, with stints after Bowling Green at Utah and Florida.

In 2009, Mullen became the head coach at Mississippi State. Hevesy and Gonzales followed him where Hevesy would become the offensive line coach and running game coordinator. In 2013, Hevesy received a promotion to co-offensive coordinator. During the years that he was the co-offensive coordinator at Mississippi State, the total rushing yards per season went up from 38th in the country with 2,279 yards in 2012 (the first season before his promotion), to 11th in the country with 3,272 yards.

Hevesy took the same position with Mullen when he left for Florida. He controlled the running game of the offense, and Gonzales, who also came to Florida, controlled the passing game.
