= Greg Knox =

American football player and coach (born 1963)

Current position
- Title: Director of career & professional development
- Team: Mississippi State
- Conference: SEC

Biographical details
- Born: September 10, 1963 (age 63); Rosebud, Texas, U.S.

Playing career
- 1984: Ranger CC
- 1985–1987: Northeastern State
- Position: Quarterback

Coaching career (HC unless noted)
- 1989–1990: Northeastern State (GA)
- 1990–1991: TCU (GA)
- 1992–1994: Stephen F. Austin (WR/ST)
- 1995: Ole Miss (WR)
- 1996–1998: Ole Miss (WR/RC)
- 1999–2008: Auburn (WR/RC)
- 2009–2013: Mississippi State (RB)
- 2014–2017: Mississippi State (RB/ST)
- 2017: Mississippi State (interim HC)
- 2018–2021: Florida (RB/ST)
- 2021: Florida (interim HC)
- 2022: Buffalo (RB/AST)
- 2023: Mississippi State (SOA)
- 2023: Mississippi State (interim HC)

Head coaching record
- Overall: 3–2
- Bowls: 1–1

Gregory L. Knox (born September 10, 1963) is an American college football coach. He is the director of career and professional development for Mississippi State University, a position he has held since 2024. He previously was the Interim Head Coach at Mississippi State University. Knox served as interim head football coach at Mississippi State for the final game of the 2017 and at the University of Florida for the final two games in 2021. From 2009 to 2021, he was Dan Mullen's running backs coach, first at Mississippi State and then at Florida.

== Playing career ==
Knox attended Rosebud-Lott High School in Travis, Texas. Jim Wacker recruited him to Southwest Texas State University. Following the 1982 national championship-winning season, Wacker left to take the head coaching job at Texas Christian University, and Knox transferred to Ranger College in Ranger, Texas. After a year at Ranger, Knox transferred to Northeastern State University in Tahlequah, Oklahoma, for the 1985 season. Knox graduated from Northeastern State with a bachelor's degree in 1986 and a master's in 1990.

== Coaching career ==
Although Knox was due to follow Mullen to Florida, he served as interim coach of the Mississippi State Bulldogs in their victory at the 2017 TaxSlayer Bowl. He served as the interim head coach for the Florida Gators after Mullen was dismissed in the 2021 season, Knox led the Gators to a win over the Florida State in the regular season finale and a loss against UCF in the 2021 Gasparilla Bowl.

Knox became interim coach a second time in November 2023 when Mississippi State fired Zach Arnett. In his first week as coach, Knox rode an ATV in the Mississippi State locker room to motivate his players, and later rode the ATV on to the field at the Egg Bowl.

== Head coaching record ==
Year	Team	Overall	Conference	Standing	Bowl/playoffs	Coaches^{#}	AP^{°}
Mississippi State Bulldogs (Southeastern Conference) (2017)
2017	Mississippi State	1–0 (Note: Knox coached the bowl game after Mullen left for Florida)	0–0		W TaxSlayer	20	19
Florida Gators (Southeastern Conference) (2021)
2021	Florida	1–1 (Note: Knox coached the final two games of the season after Florida fired Mullen)	0–0		L Gasparilla		
Florida:		1–1	0–0				
Mississippi State Bulldogs (Southeastern Conference) (2023)
2023	Mississippi State	1–1 (Note: Knox coached the final two games of the season after Mississippi State fired Arnett)	0–1	T–6th (West)			
Mississippi State:		2–1	0–1				
Total:		3–2					
