= 2017 TaxSlayer Bowl =

- 73rd Gator Bowl
Louisville Cardinals	Mississippi State Bulldogs
(8–4)	(8–4)
ACC	SEC
27	31
Head coach: Bobby Petrino	Head coach: Greg Knox (interim)
	AP / Coaches / CFP; 24 / 24 / 23
	1	2	3	4	Total
Louisville	7	14	3	3	27
Mississippi State	14	3	0	14	31
- Date: December 30, 2017
- Season: 2017
- Stadium: EverBank Field
- Location: Jacksonville, Florida
- MVP: Mark McLaurin (S, Mississippi State) & Lamar Jackson (QB, Louisville)
- Favorite: Louisville by 7.5
- Referee: Jerry McGinn (Big Ten)
- Attendance: 41,310

United States TV coverage
- Network: ESPN
- Announcers: Tom Hart, Jordan Rodgers, Cole Cubelic

The 2017 TaxSlayer Bowl was a post-season American college football bowl game played on December 31, 2017, at EverBank Field in Jacksonville, Florida. The 73rd edition of the Gator Bowl featured the Louisville Cardinals of the Atlantic Coast Conference against the Mississippi State Bulldogs of the Southeastern Conference. It was one of the 2017–18 bowl games that concluded the 2017 NCAA Division I FBS football season. The game's naming rights sponsor was tax preparation software company TaxSlayer, and for sponsorship reasons was officially known as the TaxSlayer Bowl.

== Game summary ==
=== Scoring summary ===
Scoring summary

Quarter	Time	Drive			Team	Scoring information	Score	
Quarter	Time	Plays	Yards	TOP	Team	Scoring information	UL	MSST
1	10:47	6	56	2:07	MSST	Aeris Williams 5-yard touchdown run, Jace Christmann kick good	0	7
1	6:35	8	51	4:12	UL	Charles Standberry 5-yard touchdown reception from Lamar Jackson, Blanton Creque kick good	7	7
1	3:11	9	79	3:24	MSST	Keytaon Thompson 14-yard touchdown run, Jace Christmann kick good	7	14
2	10:29	5	74	1:38	UL	Lamar Jackson 13-yard touchdown run, Blanton Creque kick good	14	14
2	4:21	7	14	3:24	MSST	23-yard field goal by Jace Christmann	14	17
2	0:19	3	88	0:45	UL	Jaylen Smith 11-yard touchdown reception from Lamar Jackson, Blanton Creque kick good	21	17
3	3:14	6	27	2:38	UL	23-yard field goal by Blanton Creque	24	17
4	13:22	4	22	0:58	MSST	Keytaon Thompson 2-yard touchdown run, Jace Christmann kick good	24	24
4	7:38	13	61	5:54	UL	31-yard field goal by Blanton Creque	27	24
4	3:39	11	65	3:59	MSST	Keytaon Thompson 1-yard touchdown run, Jace Christmann kick good	27	31
"TOP" = time of possession. For other American football terms, see Glossary of American football.							27	31

=== Statistics ===
	1	2	3	4	Total
Cardinals	7	14	3	3	27
Bulldogs	14	3	0	14	31

Statistics	UL	MSST
First downs	20	23
Plays–yards	70–358	75–404
Rushes–yards	39–187	55–287
Passing yards	171	127
Passing: Comp–Att–Int	13–31–4	11–20–1
Time of possession	30:21	29:39

Team	Category	Player	Statistics
UL	Passing	Lamar Jackson	13/31, 171 yds, 2 TD, 4 INT
UL	Rushing	Lamar Jackson	24 car, 158 yds, 1 TD
UL	Receiving	Jaylen Smith	7 rec, 107 yds, 1 TD
MSST	Passing	Keytaon Thompson	11/20, 127 yds, 1 INT
MSST	Rushing	Keytaon Thompson	27 car, 147 yds, 3 TD
MSST	Receiving	Jesse Jackson	3 rec, 38 yds
