= Dan Mullen =

American football coach (born 1972)

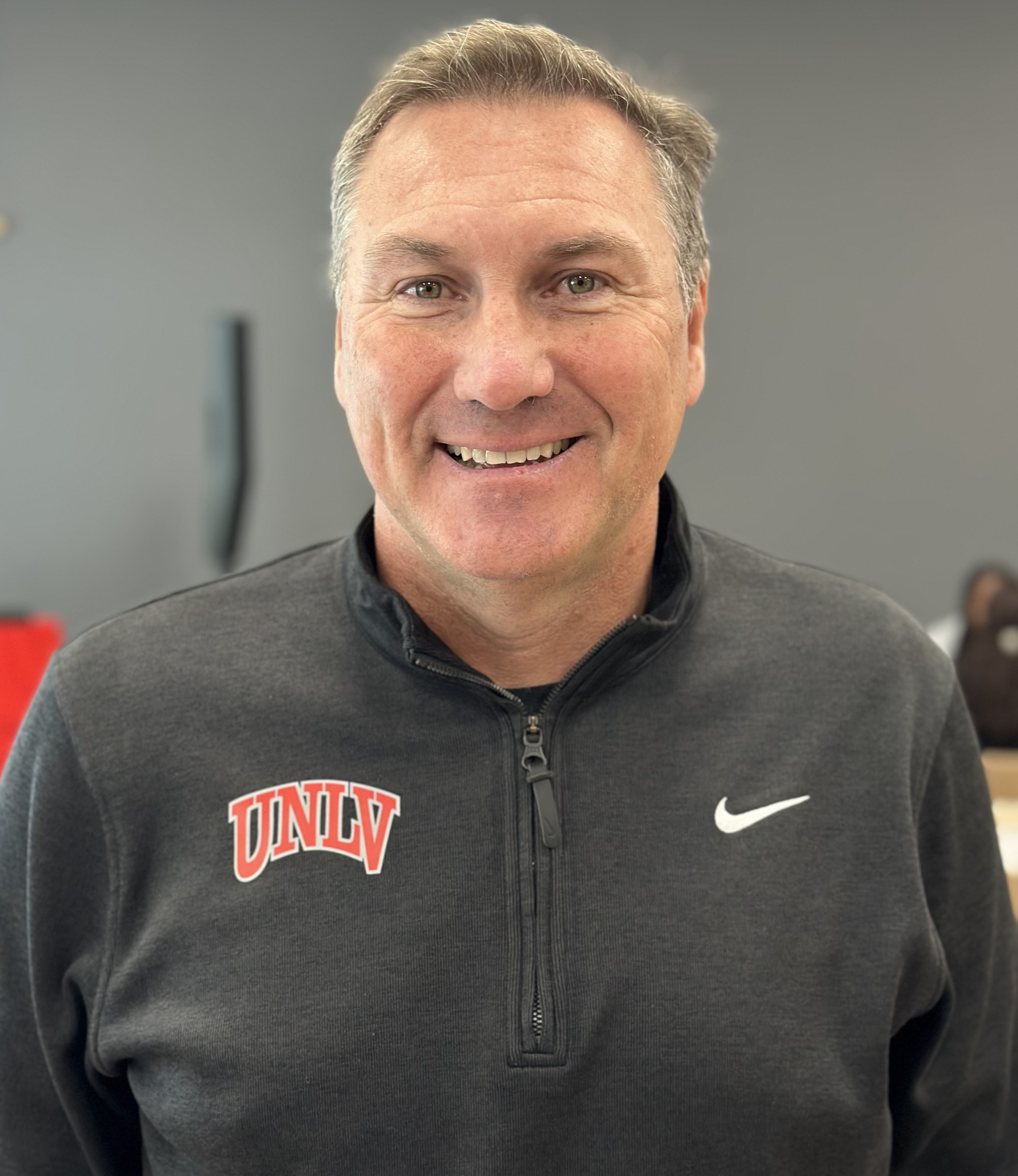
- Mullen in 2025

Current position
- Title: Head coach
- Team: UNLV
- Conference: MW
- Record: 17–8

Biographical details
- Born: April 27, 1972 (age 54); Drexel Hill, Pennsylvania, U.S.
- Education: Ursinus College (B.S.); Wagner College (M.S.)

Playing career
- 1992–1993: Ursinus
- Position: Tight end

Coaching career (HC unless noted)
- 1994–1995: Wagner (WR)
- 1996–1997: Columbia (WR)
- 1998: Syracuse (GA)
- 1999–2000: Notre Dame (GA)
- 2001–2002: Bowling Green (QB)
- 2003–2004: Utah (QB)
- 2005–2008: Florida (OC/QB)
- 2009–2017: Mississippi State
- 2018–2021: Florida
- 2025–present: UNLV

Head coaching record
- Overall: 120–69
- Bowls: 7–4

Accomplishments and honors

Championships
- 1 SEC Eastern Division (2020)

Awards
- George Munger Award (2014); SEC Coach of the Year (2014)

Daniel Mullen (born April 27, 1972) is an American college football coach who is currently the head coach at the University of Nevada, Las Vegas (UNLV). He served as the head football coach at Mississippi State University from 2009 to 2017 and the University of Florida from 2018 to 2021. From 2022 until 2024 he worked as a studio analyst and color commentator for ABC and ESPN.

== Early life ==
Mullen attended Trinity High School of Manchester, New Hampshire, where he helped lead the Pioneers to the state championship in 1988.

== College career ==
Mullen attended Ursinus College in Collegeville, Pennsylvania, where he lettered for two years playing tight end and was a first-team All-Centennial Conference selection his senior year. He graduated in 1994 with a bachelor's degree in education. He went on to Wagner College, where he coached wide receivers and earned a master's degree in education in 1996.

== Coaching career ==
After serving as a graduate assistant at Syracuse and Notre Dame, Mullen was hired by Urban Meyer to coach QBs at Bowling Green from 2001 to 2002. Mullen would stay in the same position with Meyer after the latter was hired by Utah where they both stayed for the 2003 and 2004 seasons. During his tenure at Utah, he also recruited and briefly coached Brian Johnson, a quarterback who led Utah to 13–0 and a Sugar Bowl victory for the 2008-2009 season.

Following an undefeated 2004 season which led to Utes QB Alex Smith being the first overall pick in the draft Meyer was hired by the University of Florida. Mullen served as interim offensive coordinator for the 2005 Fiesta Bowl and led the team to a 35–7 win over the Pittsburgh Panthers. After the victory Mullen would join Meyer's staff at Florida as offensive coordinator and QB coach.

As a coach, Mullen has coached several notable players, including quarterbacks Alex Smith (Utah), Heisman Trophy-winner Tim Tebow (Florida), Dak Prescott (Mississippi State), and Kyle Trask (Florida).

Mullen, along with former Philadelphia Eagles and San Francisco 49ers head coach Chip Kelly, and former Winnipeg Blue Bombers offensive coordinator Gary Crowton, are part of the so-called "New Hampshire mafia" as they all have strong connections to New Hampshire.

=== Mississippi State ===
On December 11, 2008, Mullen was hired as the head coach of Mississippi State by former athletic director Greg Byrne.

Mullen's first recruiting class at Mississippi State was ranked 19th in the nation by Scout.com. and his 2012 recruiting class was ranked 18th in the nation. In his first season as head coach at Mississippi State in 2009, his team went 5–7 against the toughest schedule in the nation.

In 2010, his Bulldog team went 9–4 overall and 4–4 in the SEC including victories over Georgia, Florida, Kentucky, and Mississippi; the four losses came to teams ranked in the top 12. Mississippi State capped off the 2010 season by defeating traditional power Michigan in the 2011 Gator Bowl, 52–14, and achieved a number-15 ranking in the final AP poll.

In 2011, Mullen's Bulldogs entered the year ranked number 19 in the nation. A loss to Auburn in the first SEC game of the year hurt the Bulldogs, and they went into the game vs Ole Miss with a 5–6 record. They defeated the Rebels, 31–3, and defeated Wake Forest, 23–17, in the Music City Bowl to finish 7–6 on the year.

In 2012, Mississippi State opened with a win over Jackson State and a win over Auburn, the first time the Bulldogs defeated the Tigers since 2007. Mississippi State had a 7–0 record, and a number 13 ranking, entering a game vs number 1, undefeated Alabama. MSU lost, 38–7, and lost two more, to number 16 Texas A&M and number 9 LSU. MSU defeated Arkansas, and was looking for a fourth straight win over Ole Miss, who was 5–6 going into the game, similar to MSU the year before. The Bulldogs lost, 41–24, and then lost to Northwestern, 34–20, in the Gator Bowl to finish 8–5.

Mississippi State started the 2013 season against number 13 Oklahoma State, losing, 21–3. They defeated Alcorn State, but lost to Auburn, 24–20. They defeated Troy, Kentucky, and Bowling Green, and lost to LSU, South Carolina, Texas A&M, and Alabama, to drop to 4–6, traveling to Little Rock, Arkansas, to battle Arkansas. MSU won, 24–17, in overtime, and was 5–6 entering the Ole Miss game. MSU missed a game-winning field goal to send the game into overtime, and Dak Prescott got a 3-yard touchdown run on 4th and 2, giving Ole Miss the ball up 17–10. Bo Wallace fumbled in the end zone, giving MSU the 17–10 victory, and for the first time in school history, a fourth straight bowl berth. MSU defeated Rice, 44–7, in the Liberty Bowl to finish 7–6.

In 2014, Mullen led the Bulldogs to one of the greatest seasons in school history. He claimed his first Top 10 win at Mississippi State, as the Bulldogs knocked off #8 LSU, 34–29, at Death Valley, allowing them to enter the polls at #12. He followed that up by beating #6 Texas A&M, 48–31, in Starkville, vaulting them to third in the nation. A week later, they beat #2 Auburn, 38–23, which propelled them to the top spot in both major polls (as well as the inaugural College Football Playoff Top 25) — the highest ranking in Mississippi State's history, and the highest that any FBS team in Mississippi had been ranked at that late date in almost half a century. Losses to Alabama and Mississippi ended any hope of a national championship. The Bulldogs finished 10–2 – only the third 10-win season in school history. This netted them an appearance in the Orange Bowl, where they lost to Georgia Tech, 49–34, the third major bowl appearance in school history, after the 1937 Orange Bowl and the 1941 Orange Bowl.

On December 26, 2016, Mullen made SEC history when he became the first football coach in conference history to win a bowl game and still finish with a losing record on the season; Mississippi State finished the season with a 6–7 mark.

On February 27, 2017, Mississippi State Athletic Director John Cohen announced a four-year extension for Mullen through February 2021.

Primarily on the strength of his sterling 2014 season, Mullen was already the third-winningest coach in Mississippi State history, behind only Jackie Sherrill and Allyn McKeen. On October 14, the Bulldogs defeated Kentucky 45–7, giving Mullen his 66th win with the Bulldogs and vaulting him past McKeen to become the second-winningest coach in school history.

=== Florida ===
On November 26, 2017, Mullen signed a six-year, $36.6 million contract to become the new head coach of the Florida Gators football team. ESPN ranked Mullen's first recruiting class at Florida at 13, an increase of six from the previous season. After a 4–7 campaign the previous year under coach Jim McElwain, Mullen's first Gator squad went 10–3 and finished ranked No. 7 in the AP Poll after a 41–15 victory over then-No. 8 Michigan in the Peach Bowl. He led the Gators to an 11–2 record the following year including a 36–28 win over Virginia in the Orange Bowl.

In his third season at Florida, Mullen's Gators began the season 8-1 and were ranked as high as #4 as quarterback Kyle Trask put up record-breaking numbers, including a nation-high 4,125 passing yards and 43 passing touchdowns, the latter of which set a school single-season record. However, they lost their last three games while giving up 144 points, including a 55-20 loss to Oklahoma in Florida's first ever trip to the Cotton Bowl Classic. Though the offense performed well, Mullen drew increasing criticism for his seeming disinterest in the bowl game, his struggle to recruit elite players to Florida, and the Gators' porous defense, which gave up more points per game than any Florida squad in over a century. Though many fans and observers called for Mullen to fire defensive coordinator Todd Grantham and shake up his defensive staff, he decided to keep Grantham and limited staff changes to two defensive assistant coaches.

The Gators were 3–1 and ranked No. 10 at the end of September during the 2021 season, but a series of upset losses saw Florida's record slip below .500. After blowout losses to arch-rival Georgia and 18.5-point underdog South Carolina in October, Mullen fired defensive coordinator Todd Grantham. After an overtime loss to underdog Missouri, Mullen was fired as the head coach of the Florida Gators on November 21, with the Gators' record at 5–6, Mullen having posted a 2-9 record in his last 11 P5 games at UF.

=== Lake Oconee Academy ===
On May 14, 2022, Mullen began volunteering as a "contributing resource" for the Lake Oconee Academy Titans by AD Chris Ingle. Rumors flared days before this was released that he would be the offensive coordinator; however, GHSA By-Law #2.51 states "An athletic coach must be a professional teacher meeting the teaching requirements and be employed by only one board of education or similar governing authority." Mullen had no intention of teaching, thus the given title "contributing resource".

=== UNLV ===
On December 12, 2024, Mullen was named the head coach at UNLV.

== Broadcasting career ==
In 2022, Mullen became a TV broadcaster. He worked as a studio analyst and color commentator, covering college football for ABC and ESPN until 2024 when he reentered coaching.

== Personal life ==
Mullen married his wife, Megan, in 2005. Together, they have two children. Mullen also has a son from a previous relationship.

== Head coaching record ==
Year	Team	Overall	Conference	Standing	Bowl/playoffs	Coaches^{#}	AP^{°}
Mississippi State Bulldogs (Southeastern Conference) (2009–2017)
2009	Mississippi State	5–7	3–5	T–4th (Western)			
2010	Mississippi State	9–4	4–4	5th (Western)	W Gator	17	15
2011	Mississippi State	7–6	2–6	5th (Western)	W Music City		
2012	Mississippi State	8–5	4–4	4th (Western)	L Gator		
2013	Mississippi State	7–6	3–5	T–5th (Western)	W Liberty		
2014	Mississippi State	10–3	6–2	2nd (Western)	L Orange^{†}	12	11
2015	Mississippi State	9–4	4–4	T–5th (Western)	W Belk		
2016	Mississippi State	6–7	3–5	T–5th (Western)	W St. Petersburg		
2017	Mississippi State	8–4	4–4	T–4th (Western)	TaxSlayer (Note: Mullen left for Florida before the bowl game)	23	24
Mississippi State:		69–46	33–39				
Florida Gators (Southeastern Conference) (2018–2021)
2018	Florida	10–3	5–3	T–2nd (Eastern)	W Peach^{†}	6	7
2019	Florida	11–2	6–2	2nd (Eastern)	W Orange^{†}	7	6
2020	Florida	8–4	8–2	1st (Eastern)	L Cotton^{†}	12	13
2021	Florida	5–6 (Note: Mullen was dismissed before the final regular-season game, a non-conference game)	2–6	6th (Eastern)			
Florida:		34–15	21–13				
UNLV Rebels (Mountain West Conference) (2025–present)
2025	UNLV	10–4	6–2	T–1st	L Frisco		
2026	UNLV	7–4	5–2				
UNLV:		17–8	11–4				
Total:		120–69					
National championship Conference title Conference division title or championship game berth
^{†}Indicates CFP / New Years' Six bowl.; ^{#}Rankings from final Coaches Poll.; ^{°}Rankings from final AP Poll.
