= Mississippi State Bulldogs =

Intercollegiate sports teams of the Mississippi State University

- University: Mississippi State University
- Conference: Southeastern Conference
- NCAA: Division I (FBS)
- Athletic director: Zac Selmon
- Location: Starkville, Mississippi
- Varsity teams: 16
- Football stadium: Davis Wade Stadium
- Basketball arena: Humphrey Coliseum
- Baseball stadium: Dudy Noble Field
- Softball stadium: Nusz Park
- Volleyball arena: Newell–Grissom Building
- Mascot: Bully
- Nickname: Bulldogs
- Fight song: Hail State
- Colors: Maroon and white
- Website: hailstate.com

SEC logo in Mississippi State's colors

Mississippi State Bulldogs is the name given to the athletic teams of Mississippi State University, in Mississippi State, Mississippi. The university is a founding member of the Southeastern Conference and competes in NCAA Division I.

== Sports sponsored ==
Men's sports	Women's sports
Baseball	Basketball
Basketball	Cross country
Football	Golf
Golf	Soccer
Tennis	Softball
Track & field^{†}	Tennis
	Track & field^{†}
	Volleyball
† – Track and field includes both indoor and outdoor.

Mississippi State sponsors teams in seven men's and nine women's NCAA sanctioned sports. Mississippi State won its first team National Championship in 2021, defeating Vanderbilt in the 2021 College World Series.

=== Baseball ===
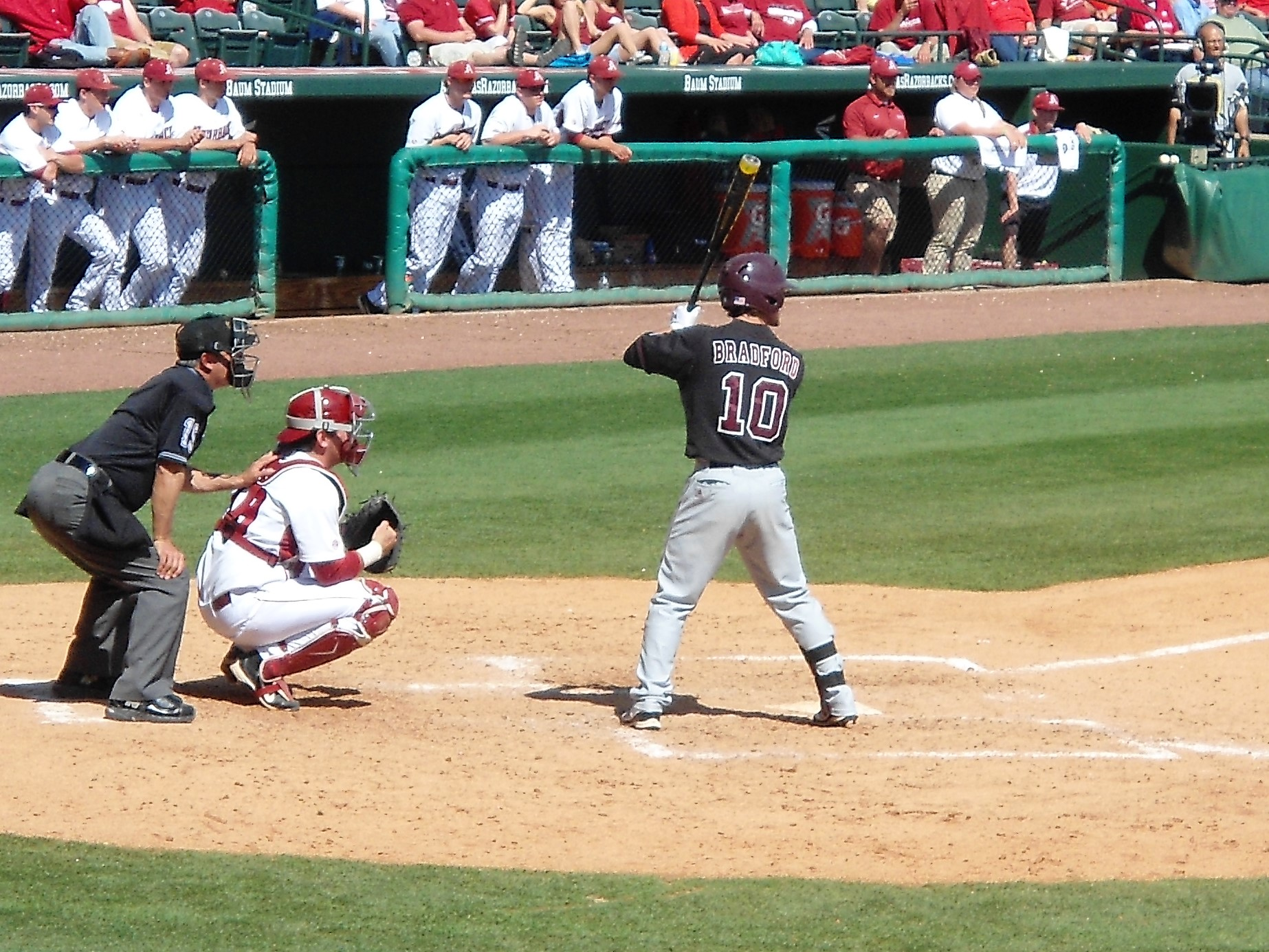
C.T. Bradford bats for the Bulldogs against Arkansas

The program is a member of the West Division of the Southeastern Conference (SEC). The current head coach is Brian O'Connor. They have appeared in the College World Series 12 times, winning their first national championship in their most recent appearance in 2021.

Mississippi State has won 11 SEC Championships in 1948, 1949, 1965, 1966, 1970, 1971, 1979, 1985, 1987, 1989, and 2016. The first six were won in a playoff series (with the first two being best-of-five while the rest were a best-of-three series). Since the formation of the SEC Tournament in 1977, the Bulldogs have won it seven times, in 1979, 1985, 1987, 1990, 2001, 2005, and 2012. The seven tournament championships and six playoff championships are a total of 13 SEC postseason championships, the most of any school.

=== Men's basketball ===
Throughout its history, Mississippi State has been a competitive force in men's basketball. The Bulldogs have accumulated 10 conference regular season championships, four conference tournament championships, seven divisional championships, and 10 NCAA Tournament appearances, including three trips to the Sweet Sixteen and a Final Four appearance in 1996. Mississippi State has also made seven appearances in the National Invitation Tournament (NIT).

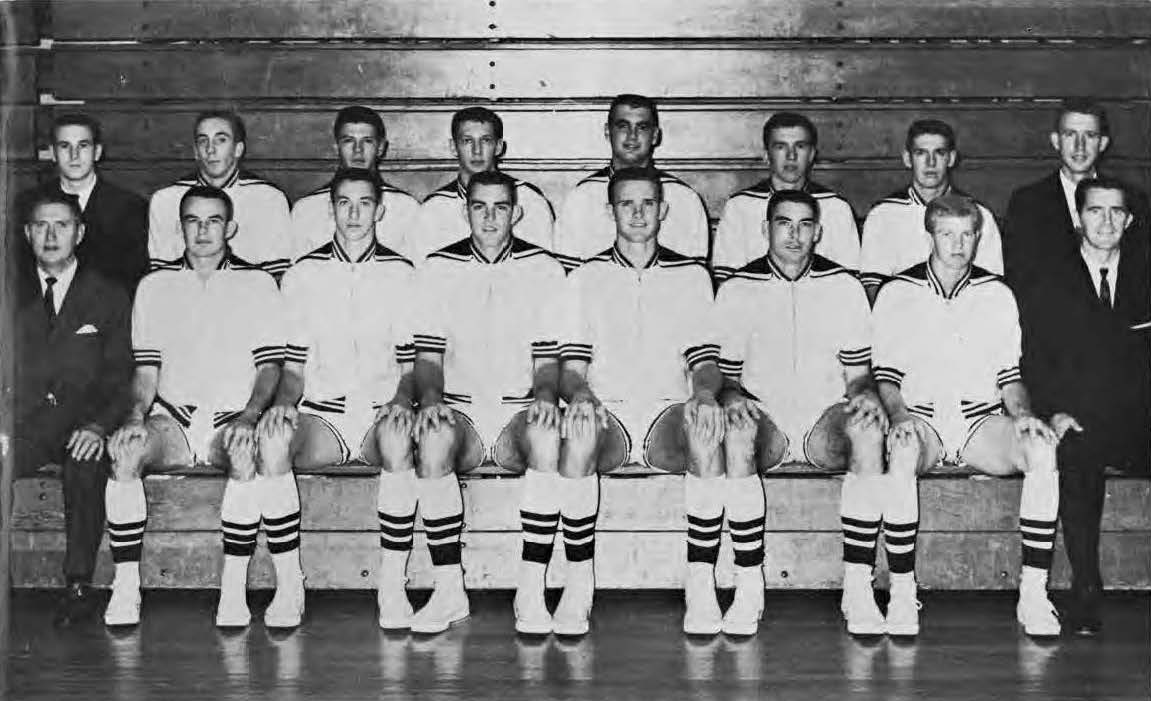
1963 Mississippi State team

In 1963, the team made history by defying an order from then-Governor of Mississippi Ross Barnett not to play in the NCAA tournament, because the team they faced, Loyola University of Chicago, had African-Americans on its squad (four of them were starters). (The Jackson Daily News also tried to intimidate the Bulldogs against playing the Ramblers by prominently featuring pictures of the four black players on the front page of the paper.) Coach Babe McCarthy sneaked the team out of Starkville to travel to East Lansing, Michigan, to face Loyola University Chicago, only to lose to the Ramblers, who went on to win the title that year. Known as the "Game of Change", this was one of the first times that an all-white Deep South school faced a team with black members, and it is considered to be a watershed moment in the Civil Rights era.

Boston Celtics great Bailey Howell played at Mississippi State and is the only MSU player to be in the Naismith Memorial Basketball Hall of Fame.

The 1995–96 team reached a pinnacle in MSU's basketball history, winning a second-straight SEC Western Division title, claiming a first-ever SEC Tournament Championship over top-ranked and eventual national champion Kentucky, and gaining a berth in the NCAA's national championship Final Four. That team earned its national championship ticket with impressive regional wins over No. 1 seed Connecticut and No. 2 seed Cincinnati. State's 26 wins that season were the most in school history at the time.

Mississippi State's Humphrey Coliseum ("the Hump") is the largest on-campus basketball arena in the state of Mississippi. Opened in 1975, Humphrey Coliseum remains one of the premier basketball venues in the Southeastern Conference, with a seating capacity of 10,500. On February 16, 2010, a crowd of 10,788 fans watched the Bulldogs play host to #2 Kentucky, breaking the coliseum's attendance record. In 2011, The Mize Pavilion, a new basketball practice facility and atrium entrance, opened in front of the coliseum. The Bulldogs have sold out of season tickets for the fourth year in a row.

=== Women's basketball ===
The Bulldogs have shown marked improvement over the last decade. Nine Bulldogs have made the All-SEC team 16 times, and even more impressive, the women have earned 28 SEC honor roll memberships since 1990. The program is notable for ending the UConn Huskies record 111-game winning streak by beating them 66–64 in overtime in the Final Four of the 2017 NCAA Tournament. The buzzer-beater shot that put the Bulldogs in front of the Huskies came from the smallest player on the court, the 5-foot-5 inch junior, Morgan William.

=== Football ===
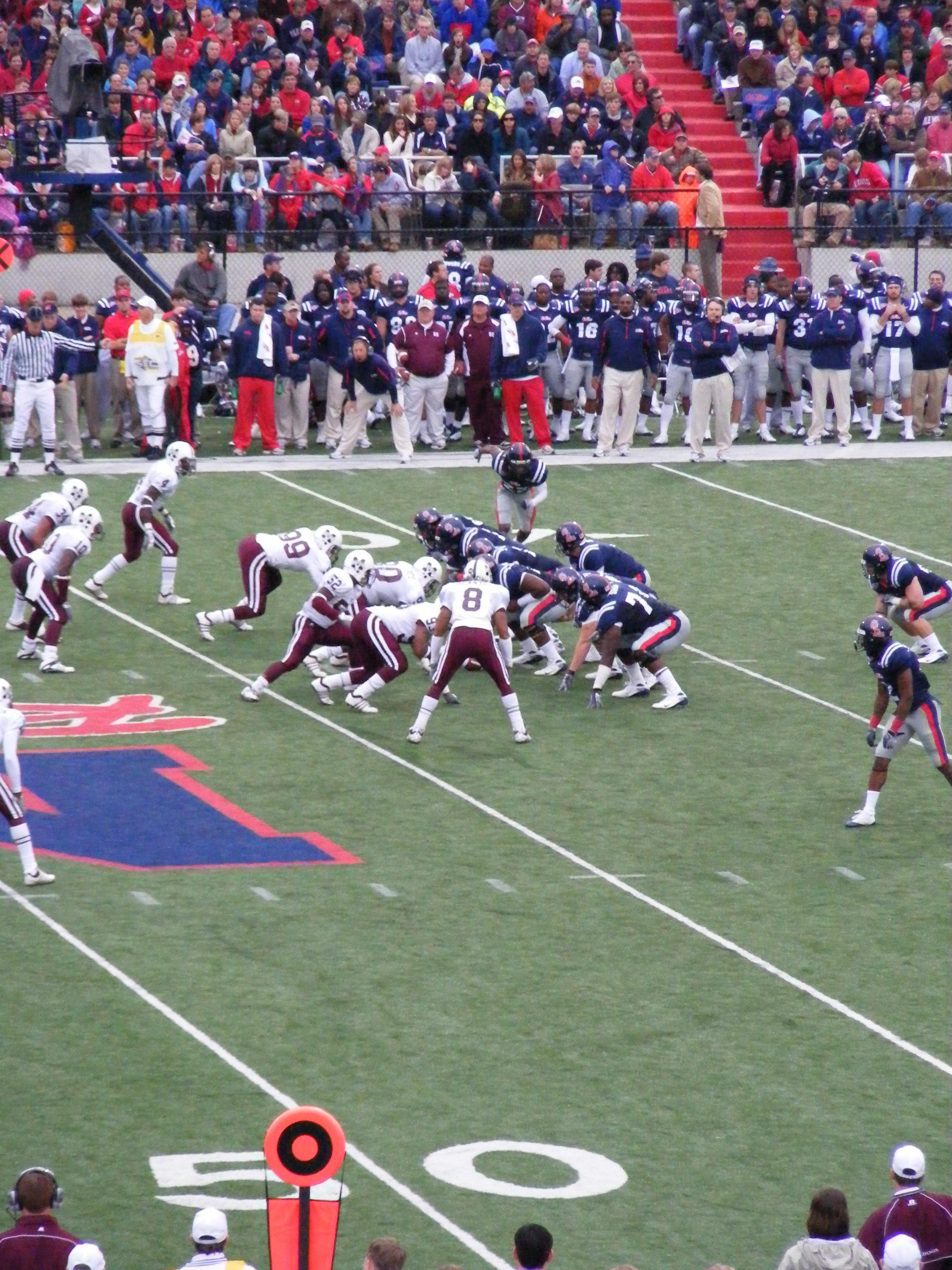
Mississippi State v Ole Miss at the 2008 Egg Bowl

Mississippi State University, then Mississippi A&M, began playing football in 1895 under the nickname "Maroons". The sport continues to be a favorite among the Bulldog faithful. Home games are played at Davis Wade Stadium at Scott Field, the second oldest football stadium in NCAA Division I-FBS, which has a seating capacity of 61,337. The largest crowd in attendance was 62,945 when No. 3 MSU beat No. 2 Auburn on October 11, 2014. After this game, the Bulldogs took over as AP number 1 in the AP rankings.

Over its history, Mississippi State has produced an SEC championship team in 1941 and a divisional championship team in 1998, along with 16 postseason bowl appearances. The Bulldogs represented the SEC Western Division in the 1998 SEC Championship Game, falling to #1 Tennessee 14–24. Jackie Sherrill, who was the head coach of the Bulldogs from 1991 to 2003, is MSU's all-time winningest coach. Sherrill led MSU to 6 postseason bowl games and an appearance in the SEC Championship Game in 1998. Allyn McKeen, who led the Bulldogs to its first and only SEC championship in 1941, has the highest winning percentage (.764). Some also credit McKeen with a national championship in 1940. The Bulldogs finished off a 9–0–1 season with a tenth victory over Georgetown 14–7 in the Orange Bowl, and finished at no. 9 in the AP poll, although some gave national title recognition to MSU. The university does not claim nor acknowledge this feat.

In 2003, MSU became the first school to hire an African-American head football coach in the SEC. In 2007, Croom led the Bulldogs to regular season wins over Auburn, Alabama, and Ole Miss before defeating C-USA Champion UCF 10–3 in the Liberty Bowl. Croom was also named the 2007 SEC Coach of the Year. The 2014 Bulldogs spent five weeks as the #1 team in the nation. They were #1 in the first ever College Football Playoff poll. During this season, the Bulldogs had three consecutive top 10 wins at LSU, vs. Texas A&M, and vs. Auburn to become the fastest team to ever go from unranked to #1.

Overall, Mississippi State has produced 38 All-Americans, 171 All-SEC selections, and 124 NFL players, including 11 first-round draft picks. Mississippi State competes in the annual Battle for the Golden Egg against in-state archrival Ole Miss, while also maintaining rivalries with Alabama and Kentucky.

The team was previously coached by Dan Mullen, former Florida offensive coordinator, who led the 2006 and 2008 Gators to national championships. During his time at MSU, Mullen led the Bulldogs to five bowl victories in, and five wins over in-state rival Ole Miss since his hiring. Mississippi State hired Joe Moorhead as its head coach after Mullen accepted the HC job at the University of Florida. In 2020, Mississippi State fired Moorhead after losing the Music City Bowl amid disciplinary issues. Washington State head coach Mike Leach was hired to replace Moorhead.

=== Tennis ===
One of the greatest Bulldog success stories since 1990 has been a tennis program firmly established among the nation's elite. The program has finished in the final top 25 rankings 12 times in that stretch (1990–2001) and in the top 10 seven times in that span.

Under the guidance of former Bulldog and current head coach Sylvain Guichard the past three seasons, State's netmen have continued that steadfastness in the national title hunt, making their 12th, 13th, and 14th straight appearances in the NCAA Championship, one of only seven schools nationally to have done so. State has made the round of 16 or better in the tournament in 10 of those 14 seasons, one of only nine schools nationally to do so.

State has also claimed one SEC title (1993), two regular season league championships and an SEC tournament crown (1996) during the past decade and a half. The Bulldogs made school-best NCAA semifinal appearances in 1994 and 1998 and have been national quarterfinalists five times. The netmen have won nearly 70% of their matches since 1991, scored the third-most SEC wins by any SEC member since 1990, and have been ranked as high as third in the country.

Individually, Bulldogs have been fixtures in the national rankings. Four State players have been ranked No. 1 in the nation in singles—Daniel Courcol in 1992–93, Laurent Orsini in 1993–94, Thomas Dupré in 1996–97, and Marco Baron in 2000–01. Dupré was the National Player of the Year following the 1997 season, and he and Baron were SEC Players of the Year in '97 and '01, respectively. Laurent Miquelard and Joc Simmons captured the 1994 NCAA doubles championship. From 2015 to 2019 Nuno Borges broke the State records having been NCAA singles runner-up in 2019, Intercollegiate Tennis Association National Player of the Year in 2019, and won the SEC Player of the Year Award three times (2017, 2018, 2019), and having ranked #1 in both singles and doubles at the national level.

== Club sports ==
Mississippi State University through the University Rec Sports office also fields several club sports which compete against several other SEC universities. MSU Club Sports include rugby, cricket, men's ice hockey, lacrosse, disc golf (Club Team acquired first national championship in school history), fencing, tactical airsoft, paintball, men's soccer, women's soccer, women's and men's volleyball, ultimate, ballroom dance, table tennis, aikido, and yoga.

Notable Club Sports accomplishments have come from the Men's Soccer club, Men's Cricket club and Men's Disc Golf club. The soccer club received a bid to the 2006 National Intramural Recreational Sports Association's national tournament. MSU cricket club beat Vanderbilt University to win the mega event of 3rd annual Bulldawg Championship Trophy 2008, held at Mississippi State University. The disc golf club won the 2009 National Championship at the Collegiate Disc Golf Championship in Augusta, Ga., winning by seven strokes over runner-up Arkansas.

Certain club sports, such as men's ice hockey, have a significant fan base. In 2008 the ice hockey club garnered more than 1,200 fans at their first ever home games in Tupelo, Mississippi at the BancorpSouth Arena, and followed in 2009 with nearly 5,000 in attendance for a series with Ole Miss.

Founded in 1977, the Mississippi State rugby team plays in the Southeastern Collegiate Rugby Conference against traditional SEC rivals such as Ole Miss. The Bulldogs are led by head coach Randy Pannell.

== Championships ==
=== Conference championships ===
Since 1895, Mississippi State has been affiliated with three different athletic conferences, including the Southern Intercollegiate Athletic Association, the Southern Conference, and the Southeastern Conference. Overall, the Bulldogs have won 31 conference regular season championships and 12 tournament championships.

==== Regular season team championships ====
- Southern Intercollegiate Athletic Association: (7):
  - Baseball (3) - 1909, 1911, 1918
  - Men's basketball (4) - 1912, 1913, 1914, 1916
- Southern Conference: (3):
  - Baseball (3) - 1921, 1922, 1924
- Southeastern Conference: (21):
  - Baseball (11) - 1948, 1949, 1965, 1966, 1970, 1971, 1979, 1985, 1987, 1989, 2016
  - Men's basketball (6) - 1959, 1961, 1962, 1963, 1991, 2004
  - Women's basketball (2) - 2018, 2019
  - Football (1) - 1941
  - Men's tennis (1) - 1993
  - Women's soccer (1) - 2024

==== Tournament team championships ====
- Southern Conference: (1):
  - Men's basketball (1) - 1923
- Southeastern Conference: (12):
  - Baseball (7) - 1979, 1985, 1987, 1990, 2001, 2005, 2012
  - Men's basketball (3) - 1996, 2002, 2009
  - Men's tennis (3) - 1996, 2018, 2019
  - Women's basketball (1) - 2019
  - Women's golf (1) - 2024

=== NCAA national championships ===
Team national championships

- Baseball (1): 2021

==== Individual national championships ====
- Men's outdoor track (7)
  - 2025 Peyton Bair Decathlon
  - 2018 Anderson Peters Javelin
  - 2014 Brandon McBride 800m
  - 1988 Lorenzo Daniel 200m
  - 1987 Garry Frank shot put
  - 1982 Michael Hadley, Daryl Jones, Michael Moore, and George Washington 1600m Relay
  - 1923 C.S. Cochran 440yd
  - 1922 C.S. Cochran 440yd
- Men's indoor track (5)
  - 2025 Peyton Bair Heptathlon
  - 2014 Brandon McBride 800m
  - 2013 D'Angelo Cherry 60m
  - 2003 Pierre Browne 60m
  - 1976 Evis Jennings 440yd
  - 1972 Dale Gibson 800yd
- Women's outdoor track (4)
  - 2016 Marta Freitas 1500m
  - 2015 Rhianwedd Price 1500m
  - 2004 Tiffany McWilliams 1500m
  - 2003 Tiffany McWilliams 1500m
- Women's indoor track (2)
  - 2013 Erica Bougard pentathlon
  - 2003 Tiffany McWilliams mile
- Boxing (1)
  - 1937 Harry Mullins Heavyweight Class
- Men's tennis(1)
  - 1994 Laurent Miquelard and Joc Simmons, Doubles
- Women's tennis (1)
  - 1989 Jackie Holden and Claire Pollard, Doubles

== Rivals ==
In football, Mississippi State and Mississippi meet each year in the Egg Bowl. The game was first played in 1901, with the Rebels currently leading the all-time series 64–47–6. In basketball, Mississippi State leads the series over Mississippi 152-120.

In baseball, Mississippi State leads the series 266–212–5.

Other rivalries include LSU in baseball, and Alabama in men's basketball.

== Traditions ==
The school colors are maroon and white.

The first teams representing Mississippi A&M, forerunner of Mississippi State, were called the Aggies. When the school officially became Mississippi State College in 1932, they were nicknamed the Maroons. The nickname officially became "Bulldogs" in 1961. However, "Bulldogs" had been used unofficially since at least 1905, when Mississippi A&M shut out Ole Miss 11–0, and the cadets ceremonially buried Ole Miss' "athletic spirit" with a bulldog pup placed on top of the coffin. Later, newspaper accounts of the victory reported that the Aggies had played with a "bulldog" style of play. Since then, "Bulldogs" had been used interchangeably with "Aggies" and "Maroons." Since 1935, the mascot has been a registered English bulldog with the nickname "Bully," which is also used for the costumed mascot.

Cowbells are a significant part of any Mississippi State University experience. The tradition began after a jersey cow wandered onto the football field in the early 1900s, disrupting a game. Subsequently, State won the football game, and the cow became a symbol of good luck. Eventually, the cow was replaced with just the cowbell. Handles were welded onto the bells to ease ringing, and cowbells are now manufactured and sold specifically as athletic noisemakers. Clanging cowbells rung by many of the State fans is a part of the tradition of MSU football games, despite the SEC banning "artificial noise-makers" at conference games–a rule aimed at Mississippi State–from 1974 to 2010. That rule was finally lifted at the beginning of the 2010 season, initially on a trial basis, with cowbells only permitted to ring during halftime, timeouts, and after touchdowns. Bulldog fans complied with these rules, and cowbells have been allowed every season ever since.

The school's fight song is "Hail State" and the alma mater is "Maroon and White", both of which are played by the Famous Maroon Band.

== Hall of Fame ==
MSU has honored many athletes with induction to its Mississippi State University Sports Hall of Fame.

== Notable people ==
- Jack Cristil – Legendary radio broadcaster
- Chris Jans – Men's Basketball Coach
- Jeff Lebby – Football Coach
- Chris Lemonis - National Championship Baseball Coach
- Sam Purcell -Women's Basketball Coach

== See also ==
- List of college athletic programs in Mississippi
