= Mississippi State Bulldogs football =

Football team representing Mississippi State University

2026 Mississippi State Bulldogs football team
- First season: 1895; 131 years ago
- Athletic director: Zac Selmon
- General manager: Marc Votteler
- Head coach: Jeff Lebby; 3rd season, 12–24 (.333)
- Location: Starkville, Mississippi
- Stadium: Davis Wade Stadium (capacity: 60,311)
- Field: Scott Field
- NCAA division: Division I FBS
- Conference: SEC
- Colors: Maroon and white
- All-time record: 598–633–39 (.486)
- Bowl record: 15–12 (.556)

Conference championships
- SEC: 1941

Division championships
- SEC West: 1998
- Consensus All-Americans: 3
- Rivalries: Ole Miss (rivalry); Alabama (rivalry); LSU (rivalry)

Uniforms
- Fight song: Hail State
- Mascot: Bully
- Marching band: Famous Maroon Band
- Outfitter: Adidas
- Website: HailState.com

The Mississippi State Bulldogs football program represents Mississippi State University in the sport of American football. The Bulldogs compete in the Football Bowl Subdivision (FBS) of the National Collegiate Athletic Association (NCAA) as well as the Southeastern Conference (SEC). They also have won one SEC championship in 1941 and a division championship in 1998. The Bulldogs have 27 postseason bowl appearances. The program has produced 38 All-Americans (three consensus), 171 All-SEC selections, and 124 NFL players (11 first-round draft picks). The Bulldogs’ home stadium, Davis Wade Stadium at Scott Field, is the second oldest in the NCAA Division I FBS.

== History ==
=== Early history (1895–1966) ===
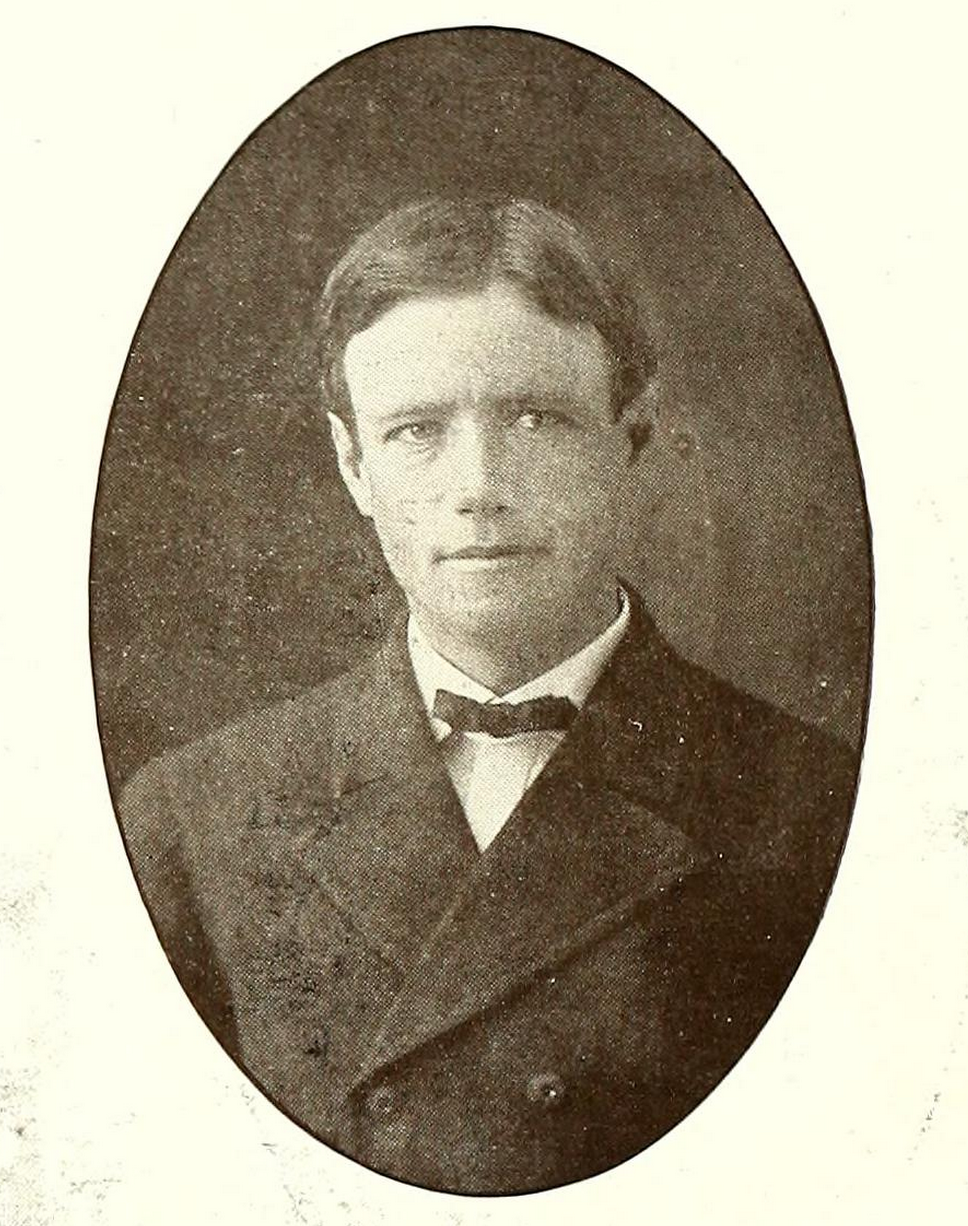
Dan Martin, coach 1903–06

Mississippi State (then known as the Mississippi A&M Aggies) first fielded a football team in 1895. The team was coached by W. M. Matthews. During his one-season tenure, Matthews posted an overall record of zero wins and two losses (0–2). He is also credited with the selection of what became the official school colors, maroon and white, prior to the Aggies first game ever played at Union University.

Daniel S. Martin left rival Ole Miss and served as the Aggies' head football coach from 1903–1906. His final record in Starkville was 10–11–3. W. D. Chadwick led the Aggies from 1909–1913. His final record was 29–12–2. During his five-season tenure, Mississippi A&M appeared in and won its first bowl game, the 1911 Bacardi Bowl in Havana, Cuba. Fullback Dutch Reule was selected All-Southern. The 1911 team was also referred to as 'The Bull Dogs'. Earl C. Hayes replaced Chadwick and led Mississippi A&M to 15–8–2 record from 1914–1916. Hunter Kimball received the most votes of any All-Southern halfback in 1914. The Mississippi Legislature renamed Mississippi A&M as "Mississippi State College" in 1925 and the mascot was changed from Aggies to Maroons in 1932. Ralph Sasse enjoyed success as Mississippi State's head football coach. After leading Mississippi State to a 20–10–2 record in three years and an appearance in the 1937 Orange Bowl, a loss, Sasse stunned the students and players by resigning from his head coach's duties, following a doctor's orders after a sudden nervous breakdown. Allyn McKeen left Memphis to become head football coach at Mississippi State, where he compiled a 65–19–3 record in ten seasons. In 1940, he was named Southeastern Conference Coach of the Year after leading Mississippi State to its only undefeated season in school history and its second Orange Bowl appearance, a victory. The following year, 1941, his Maroons squad captured the first and only Southeastern Conference championship in program history. McKeen retired from coaching in 1948 after being fired by Athletic Director Dudy Noble because of a 4–4–1 season. He was inducted into the College Football Hall of Fame as a coach in 1991. Mississippi State did not field a football team in 1943. Arthur Morton left VMI to become MSU's head football coach after McKeen's retirement. Morton's Maroons posted struggling records of 0–8–1, 4–5 and 4–5 for a cumulative record of 8–18–1 before Morton's firing. Murray Warmath came to Mississippi State from his post as line coach at Army and posted records of 5–4 and 5–2–3 for a cumulative two-season record of 10–6–3. Having coached only two seasons in Starkville, Warmath resigned after the 1953 season to take the job of University of Minnesota head coach. Darrell Royal came to Mississippi State from the CFL's Edmonton Eskimos and put up back-to-back 6–4 records in his two seasons as the Maroons head football coach. Royal resigned after the 1955 season to accept the head football coach position at Washington.

Wade Walker was promoted from line coach to head coach following Royal's departure. Walker compiled a 22–32–2 record over his 6-season tenure. In 1958 the Legislature renamed the university as Mississippi State University. The Mississippi State Maroons posted a lackluster 2–7–1 record in 1959. The following year, Walker's Maroons improved to 5–5, but students, fans and alumni demanded his ouster. University president Dean W. Colvard relented and fired Walker as football coach, but kept him on as athletic director, a post he kept until 1966. Mississippi State changed its mascot from Maroons to Bulldogs in 1960. However, "Bulldogs" had been used unofficially since at least 1905, and the nickname had long been interchangeable with "Maroons." Paul Davis was promoted from assistant coach to head coach following Walker's firing. His teams went 20–38–2 overall and 9–22–2 in the Southeastern Conference in Davis' five seasons. The Bulldogs had a 7–2–2 record in 1963, earning its first postseason bowl game since 1939. The team finished the season with a 16–12 victory over North Carolina State in front of 8,309 fans at the 1963 Liberty Bowl played in a bitter cold Philadelphia. Mississippi State was able to convert two botched North Carolina State punts into touchdowns, and a 13–0 lead at the first quarter. United Press International named Davis the SEC Coach of the Year for the 1963 season. After a lackluster 2–8 record in 1966, MSU terminated Davis, as well as athletic director Wade Walker.

=== Charles Shira era (1967–1972) ===
Charles Shira, who had been defensive coordinator at the University of Texas under former Bulldogs head coach Darrell Royal, was appointed both head football coach and athletic director at Mississippi State in January 1967. His first two teams went 2–8 (1967) and 0–8–2 (1968), followed by 3–7 in 1969; that December he coached the Gray squad in the Blue–Gray Classic.

Mississippi State posted a 6–5 campaign in 1970, highlighted by an upset of No. 10 Ole Miss; Shira was subsequently named the SEC Coach of the Year. Shira also oversaw the program’s racial integration when defensive back Frank Dowsing joined the team in 1969.

After 2–9 (1971) and 4–7 (1972) seasons, Shira stepped down as head coach to concentrate on his athletic director role; his six-year coaching record at MSU was 16–45–2 (5–32–2 SEC).

=== Bob Tyler era (1973–1978) ===
Bob Tyler was promoted from offensive coordinator (1972) to head coach following Charles Shira’s resignation, later also serving concurrently as Mississippi State’s athletic director from 1976 to 1979.

In his second season, Tyler guided Mississippi State to a 9–3 record and a Sun Bowl victory over North Carolina; that year included conference wins over Georgia and LSU, and a top‑20 finish in the final polls.

The Bulldogs finished 6–4–1 in 1975 and 9–2 in 1976 (No. 20 AP), followed by 5–6 in 1977 and 6–5 in 1978; NCAA probation related to alleged improper benefits led to the forfeiture of multiple wins from the 1975–1977 seasons in post‑facto NCAA action.

Tyler’s Mississippi State tenure included four winning seasons and two nine‑win campaigns; after the 1978 season, he departed the head coaching post while having also held the director of athletics role during part of his tenure.

=== Emory Bellard era (1979–1985) ===
Emory Bellard, who had resigned as head coach of Texas A&M during the 1978 season after only six games, was hired to serve as head football coach at Mississippi State beginning with the next (1979) season. He was head coach from 1979 until 1985. He was considered to have had one of the most innovative offensive minds in football and is credited for inventing the wishbone formation. Bellard spent seven seasons as head coach at MSU. His best years as the Bulldogs head coach were in 1980 and 1981, when his team finished 9–3 and 8–4, respectively. Also, Bellard was the coach when Mississippi State defeated number 1, undefeated Alabama 6–3 in Jackson, Mississippi, in 1980. However, the Bulldogs significantly regressed after 1981. In the next five seasons, he only won a total of five games in SEC play. Before the 1985 season, Bellard boldly predicted that the Bulldogs would rebound and win their first SEC title since 1941. They not only failed to do so, but went winless in SEC play. Bellard was fired after the season. He would, however, return in 1988 to coach at the high school level in Texas.

=== Rockey Felker era (1986–1990) ===
Rockey Felker returned to his alma mater, which was coming off four consecutive losing seasons, from his post as wide receivers coach at Alabama. At 33, Felker was the youngest coach in the country and the first Mississippi State coach in 30 years to start his career as MSU head football coach with a winning record (6–5). However, the Bulldogs never recovered from four consecutive blowout losses at the end of the 1986 season, during which they scored a total of nine points, including a 24–3 loss to Ole Miss. Felker suffered through four losing seasons (4–7, 1–10, 5–6, 5–6) between 1987 and 1990, and only won a total of five games in SEC play. He was only 1–4 vs. Ole Miss. He resigned under pressure at the end of the 1990 season, but would be brought back by his successor, Jackie Sherrill, as running backs coach for two seasons and in a non-coaching position in the football program, where he serves to this day.

=== Jackie Sherrill era (1991–2003) ===
After three years away from the game, former Washington State, Pittsburgh and Texas A&M head coach Jackie Sherrill was hired as head football coach at Mississippi State in 1991. He took over a program that hadn't had a winning season since 1986 (and had won a total of 14 games in that stretch) and hadn't had a winning record in Southeastern Conference play since 1981. Sherrill began his Mississippi State career with an upset victory over a familiar foe from his A&M days, the Texas Longhorns (who were the defending Southwest Conference champions). In thirteen seasons in Starkville, Sherrill coached the Bulldogs to a record of 75–75–2. His 75 wins are the most in school history. He led the team to an SEC West title in 1998, and a berth in the Cotton Bowl Classic. A year later, he notched a 10–2 record and No. 12 final ranking. That No. 12 ranking was the highest final ranking achieved by any NCAA Division I-A school in Mississippi in over 30 years. Sherrill, along with Bill Snyder of Kansas State, were among the first to use the rich JUCO systems of their respective states to help their programs progress. Although Sherrill won only eight games in his last three seasons, he built Mississippi State into a consistent winner despite playing in the same division as powerhouses like Alabama, Auburn and LSU. He also finished with a winning record against in-state rival Ole Miss (7–6). Under Sherrill, the Bulldogs went to six bowl games; before his arrival they'd only been to seven bowls in 96 years of play. Sherrill also achieved notoriety by having his team observe the castration of a bull as a motivational technique prior to a game versus Texas. Unranked Mississippi State subsequently beat the No. 13 ranked Longhorns. Sherrill retired after the 2003 season, which was followed by the NCAA levying probation for four years on the program. Despite a prolonged 3-year investigation by the NCAA, Mississippi State was not found guilty of any major violations, and Sherrill was never personally found guilty of any NCAA rules violations at either Mississippi State or Texas A&M.

=== Sylvester Croom era (2004–2008) ===
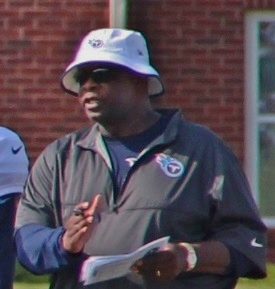
Head coach Sylvester Croom

Sylvester Croom, a longtime assistant in the NFL and a former player for Bear Bryant at Alabama, was hired to replace Jackie Sherrill. Croom's hiring was significant, because he is not only the first African American head coach in Mississippi State football history, but also in the history of the Southeastern Conference (SEC). As of May 2024, Croom is one of only five black head coaches (excluding interims) in the history of the SEC. When Croom was hired at Mississippi State, he inherited a program that was riddled with NCAA sanctions and had not won consistently since the 1990s. Croom led the Bulldogs to a 3–8 (2–6 SEC) record in 2004. State began the season with a victory over Tulane, then lost five straight, to No. 18 Auburn, Maine, No. 13 LSU, Vanderbilt and UAB. The next week, State upset No. 20 Florida in what turned out to be the game that got Florida head coach Ron Zook fired. The next game saw State beat Kentucky. State then lost their final three games of the season to Alabama, Arkansas and Ole Miss. In 2005, State again finished 3–8. After defeating Murray State in the season opener, State lost to Auburn then beat Tulane in Shreveport, Louisiana. State then lost seven consecutive games, starting with No. 7 Georgia, then No. 4 LSU, No. 13 Florida, Houston, Kentucky, No. 4 Alabama and Arkansas. State defeated Ole Miss in the Egg Bowl to finish the season.

Mississippi State struggled to a 3–9 record in 2006. State lost its first three games of the season to South Carolina, No. 4 Auburn, Tulane, State beat UAB to get its first win of the year in the fourth game. Losses to No 9 LSU and No. 4 West Virginia followed, then State defeated Jacksonville State to snap the two-game skid. State then lost to Georgia and Kentucky. MSST then upset Alabama in Alabama before losing to No. 5 Arkansas and Ole Miss. During the 2007 season, during which his team won eight games, including the Liberty Bowl, Croom garnered Coach of the Year awards from three organizations. On December 4, 2007, Croom was named coach of the year by the American Football Coaches Association for region two. The AFCA has five regional coaches of the year and announces a national coach of the year each January. That same year, on December 5, Croom was named SEC Coach of the Year twice, once as voted by the other SEC coaches and once as voted by The Associated Press. It was the first time a Mississippi State coach received the AP honor since Charley Shira in 1970 and the first time a Mississippi State coach received the coaches award since Wade Walker in 1957. After a 4–8 record in 2008, a season marred by lackluster offensive performances culminating with a 45–0 blowout loss to rival No. 25 Ole Miss, Croom was pressured by school officials to resign as head coach of the Bulldogs.

=== Dan Mullen era (2009–2017) ===
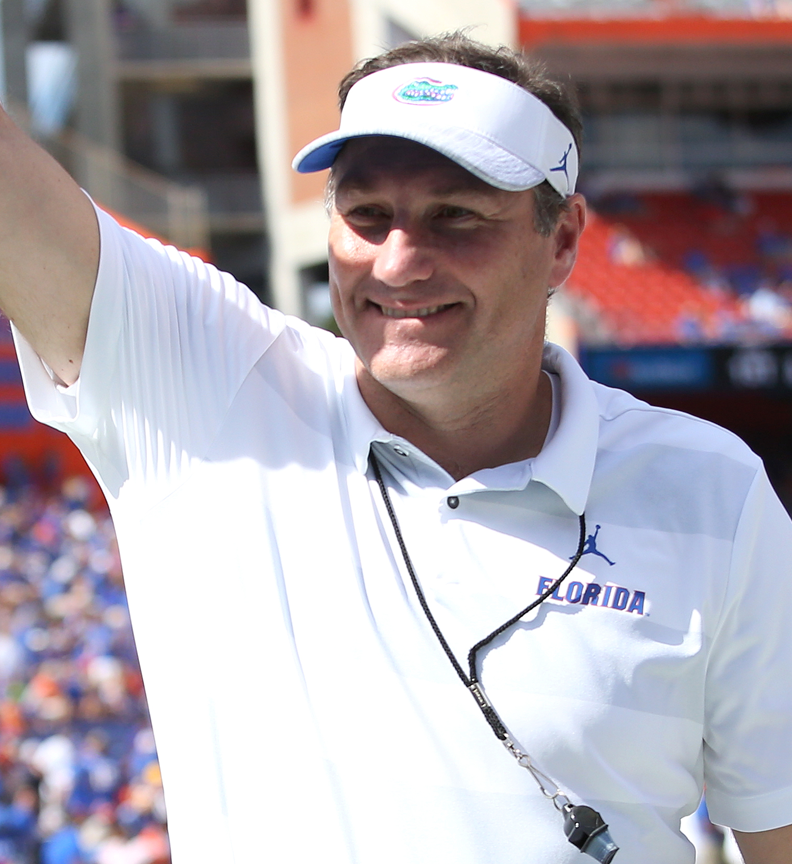
Coach Dan Mullen

On December 10, 2008, Florida offensive coordinator Dan Mullen was hired as Mississippi State's head coach. Despite having no prior head coaching experience, Mullen arrived in Starkville with an explosive offensive track record and a reputation as a "quarterback whisperer", having tutored Alex Smith, Chris Leak and Tim Tebow during his career as an assistant coach. Serving under head coach Urban Meyer, Mullen oversaw a spread offense at Florida that was one of the most explosive in the country, helped the Gators capture the 2006 and 2008 national championships and sent many players into the National Football League. When he was hired by Mississippi State, Mullen signed a four-year contract worth $1.2 million annually excluding incentives. As soon as he arrived, Dan Mullen overhauled Sylvester Croom's more run-heavy, ball control offense in favor of the spread offensive attack that worked so well at Florida.

In Mullen's first season, the Bulldogs finished 5–7, ending upbeat with a 41–27 victory over No. 20 Ole Miss in the Egg Bowl. In 2010, they started 1–2, and then they had a 6-game winning streak to make their record 7–2 before losing to Alabama and Arkansas, but defeated Ole Miss. The team participated in a bowl game for the first time since 2007, soundly defeating Michigan in the Gator Bowl 52–14. In 2011, the Bulldogs entered the season ranked No. 19 in the country, and they started 1–0, before losing to the defending national champion Auburn 41–34. Mississippi State entered the Ole Miss game in Starkville needing a win to qualify for a bowl bid for a second straight season. The Bulldogs won 31–3, earning Mullen the distinction as the first coach to beat Ole Miss in his first three tries since Allyn McKeen in 1941. The Bulldogs capped off the season with a Music City Bowl win over Wake Forest in Nashville, Tennessee. In 2012, Mississippi State defeated Tennessee 41–31 in their sixth game of the season to become bowl eligible. After a 7–0 start the team won only one of its remaining five games to finish 8–5, including a 41–24 loss at Ole Miss and a 34–20 loss to the No. 21 Northwestern in the Gator Bowl. This was the first time Mississippi State appeared in a bowl three straight years since 2000. In 2013, MSST under Mullen became bowl eligible for the fourth consecutive year following a 17–10 overtime win over Ole Miss. MSST defeated Rice in the Liberty Bowl December 31, 2013, in Memphis, Tennessee, by a score of 44–7. It was MSST's third bowl win in the last four years.

2014 turned out to be the most historic season for the team. Led by quarterback Dak Prescott, the Bulldogs reached a No. 1 national ranking for the first time ever, doing so in both the Amway Coaches Poll and the AP Poll, after beating 3 consecutive top-10 teams (No. 8 LSU Tigers, No. 6 Texas A&M Aggies, and No. 2 Auburn Tigers). As a result, the Bulldogs became the fastest team in AP Poll's history to reach the No. 1 ranking, from being unranked, in only 5 weeks. They also became the first team to be ranked No. 1 in the new FBS Playoff Football Poll and held the top ranking for the first three weeks of the poll before losing to Alabama. However, at the end of the season, only one of the three teams remained ranked. Auburn finished 8–5 (4–4 SEC) and ranked No. 22, and lost to Wisconsin in the Outback Bowl, Texas A&M finished 7–5 (3–5 SEC) and beat West Virginia in the Liberty Bowl, and LSU, finished 8–4 (4–4 SEC) and lost to Notre Dame in the Music City Bowl. The Bulldogs couldn't sustain that momentum, and lost two of their last three regular season games, first to No. 5 Alabama 25–20 and then two weeks later to No. 18 Ole Miss 31–17. That loss knocked the Bulldogs out of playoff contention, leaving them 10–2 and ranked No. 7 by the College Football Playoff Committee in their final rankings. As a result, they were awarded a trip to the Orange Bowl against No. 10 Georgia Tech on December 31, 2014. Thanks to the Bulldogs’ inability to stop Georgia Tech's heavy use of the triple option, State lost that contest 49–34. Mississippi State finished the season 10–3 and were ranked No. 11 in the final AP Poll. In 2015, the Bulldogs went 4–4 in the SEC and finished the regular season with an 8–4 record and went on to play in the 2015 Belk Bowl against the NC State Wolfpack, winning 51–28. Dak Prescott was named the game MVP after throwing 4 touchdowns. Prescott finished his college career with 38 school records, and is the most decorated player in school history.

2016 saw the Bulldogs stumble to a 5–7 regular season record. The season included 3 losses on the final play of games against South Alabama, BYU, and Kentucky. The Bulldogs were able to finish the season on a high note defeating in-state rival Ole Miss 55–20 in the 2016 Egg Bowl. Due to a shortage of 6-win teams and MSU's Academic Progress Rate, they made their seventh consecutive bowl appearance in the St. Petersburg Bowl against Miami (OH) on December 26. The Bulldogs won the game thanks to a blocked extra point and a blocked field goal, edging Miami (Ohio) 17–16. On February 27, 2017, Mississippi State athletic director John Cohen announced a four-year contract extension for Coach Mullen through February 2021. On November 26, 2017, after an 8–4 regular season, Dan Mullen left Mississippi State University to become the head coach at the University of Florida. Ironically, the athletics director who hired him at Florida was Scott Stricklin who had previously worked with Mullen as the athletics director at Mississippi State from 2010 to 2016.

=== Joe Moorhead era (2018–2019) ===
After Dan Mullen’s departure, Mississippi State hired Penn State offensive coordinator Joe Moorhead as the program's 33rd head coach. Despite no prior ties to the southern United States, Moorhead arrived in Starkville with a reputation as an outstanding offensive mind who believed in the spread offense, turning around a struggling FCS program in Fordham as the head coach before moving to Penn State as offensive coordinator where his potent offenses set school records. The Mississippi State University administration signed Moorhead to a four-year contract worth a total of $11 million over the course of the deal.

Moorhead led the Bulldogs to an 8–4 record in 2018, tied for the most wins for a first-year coach in school history. However, his second season got off to a rough start when it emerged that 10 players allowed a tutor to take tests and complete coursework for them. The players were all suspended for eight games, severely limiting the Bulldogs' depth. Fans were also angered by a pedestrian offense and upsets by Kansas State and Tennessee. There was also concern that he didn't really fit in with Mississippi State's culture, even though he'd taken the podium ringing a cowbell when he was formally introduced as head coach.

According to ESPN, Mississippi State officials intended to fire Moorhead if he didn't defeat Ole Miss in the 2019 Egg Bowl. However, the Bulldogs won that game 21–20 to become bowl-eligible, making Moorhead only the third Bulldog coach to win his first two Egg Bowls. At an emotional press conference the following day, Moorhead tried to knock down the rumors about his job security, saying, "This is my school, this is my team, this is my program," and that anyone who thought otherwise could "pound sand and kick rocks." He added, "You'll have to drag my Yankee ass out of here." However, on January 3, 2020, Moorhead was fired after finishing 6–7 following a 38–28 loss to Louisville in the Music City Bowl. Besides the Bulldogs' lackluster performance in that game, athletic director John Cohen and other school officials were angered when they learned quarterback Garrett Shrader had suffered an eye injury during a fight in practice, an incident that appeared to show a lack of discipline within the program under Moorhead's watch. Shrader had missed the game with what Moorhead initially described as an "upper body injury." On January 3, 2020, after failing to energize the offense, and several off field issues, Mississippi State announced Moorhead's firing.

=== Mike Leach era (2020–2022) ===
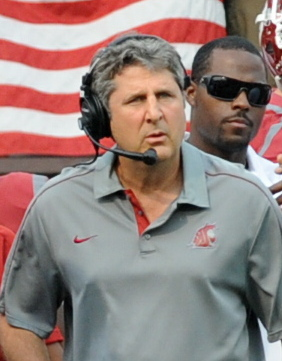
Coach Leach

On January 9, 2020, Mississippi State athletic director John Cohen announced the hiring of then-Washington State and former Texas Tech head coach Mike Leach to the vacant head coaching position. Leach arrived with a reputation as a great offensive mind and installed a pass-heavy, up-tempo offensive attack known as the air raid that he has utilized throughout his coaching career. During Leach's introductory press conference, John Cohen also stated that one of the other reasons for Leach's hiring was his record and reputation as a disciplinarian, something that appeared to be missing in the Mississippi State football program under Joe Moorhead. Mike Leach also had prior coaching experience in the Southeastern Conference, serving as offensive coordinator at Kentucky under Hal Mumme for two seasons in 1997 and 1998. Leach signed a four-year contract with Mississippi State worth $20 million excluding incentives.

The 2020 season started with a 44–34 upset victory over no. 6 LSU, who had won the CFP National Championship the previous season. However, Leach's Bulldogs struggled the rest of the season, winning only two more games, 24–17 over Vanderbilt and 51–32 over Missouri, finishing the regular season at 3–7. Despite the losing record, the Bulldogs were invited to the Armed Forces Bowl, as the NCAA waived bowl eligibility requirements due to the COVID-19 pandemic. Mississippi State faced off against no. 24 Tulsa, defeating the Golden Hurricane 28–26 to finish with an overall record of 4–7. Leach led the Bulldogs to a 7–5 record in the 2021 regular season. The season was highlighted with ranked victories over Texas A&M, Kentucky, and Auburn. They qualified for the Liberty Bowl, where they lost 34–7 to Texas Tech. On June 30, 2022, Mississippi State and Mike Leach agreed to terms on a contract extension that would keep the coach in Starkville through the completion of the 2025 season and raise his annual pay to $5.5 million.

Continuing the program's upward trajectory, Leach led the Bulldogs to an 8–4 record in the 2022 regular season. Notably, the Bulldogs recorded victories over ranked opponents Texas A&M and Ole Miss. However, Leach died in a Jackson, Mississippi hospital on December 12, 2022 after a suffering a heart attack at home. Defensive coordinator Zach Arnett led the team in its bowl game, a 19–10 victory over Illinois in the ReliaQuest Bowl. Leach's passing resulted in an outpouring of grief, sympathy and sadness from across the country.

=== Zach Arnett era (2022–2023) ===
On December 15, 2022, Zach Arnett was named the 35th head coach of the Bulldogs. Prior to Mike Leach's death, Arnett had been appointed interim head coach after Leach had been hospitalized. Arnett was fired on November 13, 2023, after beginning the season with a 4–6 record. Along with the losing record, athletics director Zac Selmon was concerned about Arnett's complete overhaul of Leach's air raid offense in favor of a more balanced, traditional offensive attack, coordinated by Kevin Barbay. The offensive statistics in Arnett's lone season as head coach greatly fell from the team's 2022 offensive production under Leach, who was steadily making strides with the team's offense with the SEC's all-time leader in completions Will Rogers at quarterback. For Arnett's buyout, Mississippi State had to pay the fired coach $4.5 million.

=== Jeff Lebby era (2024–present) ===
On November 26, 2023, Oklahoma offensive coordinator Jeff Lebby was named Mississippi State's 36th head coach. Mississippi State is Lebby's first head coaching position after several years as an assistant coach. Lebby signed a four-year contract worth $4.51 million annually. Lebby also had prior ties to the state of Mississippi and the Southeastern Conference from his time as offensive coordinator at Ole Miss under Lane Kiffin from 2020 to 2021.

== Conference affiliations ==
Mississippi State has been a member of the Southeastern Conference since its founding in 1932.

- Independent (1895)
- Southern Intercollegiate Athletic Association (1896–1921).
- Southern Conference (1922–1932)
- Southeastern Conference (1932–present)

== Championship ==
=== Conference championship ===
The 1941 Mississippi State Bulldogs finished the year with an 8–1–1 record, and won the Southeastern Conference championship. The season included wins over Florida, Alabama, Auburn, and Ole Miss. The Bulldogs tied with LSU and were defeated by Duquesne.

Season	Conference	Coach	Overall record	Conference record
1941	SEC	Allyn McKeen	8–1–1	4–0–1

=== Division championship ===
The SEC was split into two divisions from the 1992 season to the 2023 season with Mississippi State competing in the SEC West during that time. In 1998, MSU finished the regular season with a 26–14 win over Alabama, a 22–21 win over Arkansas, and a 28–6 win over Ole Miss in Oxford, Mississippi. At the end of the regular season, both MSU and Arkansas finished with 6–2 conference records, but by virtue of MSU's head-to-head win over Arkansas, MSU earned the right to represent the SEC West in the SEC Championship Game. In that game, MSU led eventual national champion Tennessee in the fourth quarter before falling 14–24 in the Georgia Dome. They continued on to play in the Cotton Bowl Classic in Dallas, Texas, against the 20th-ranked Texas Longhorns. The Bulldogs lost the game 11–38 on 24 unanswered Longhorn points in the 3rd quarter.

Season	Division	Coach	Opponent	SEC CG result
1998†	SEC West	Jackie Sherrill	Tennessee	L 14–24

† Co-champions

== Bowl games ==
Mississippi State has played in 27 bowl games, compiling a record of 15–12 through the 2025 season. Memorable highlights include wins in the 1941 Orange Bowl, the 1963 Liberty Bowl, the 1999 Peach Bowl, and the 2011 Gator Bowl.

Mississippi State's first bowl game was against the Havana Athletic Club in the Bacardi Bowl on January 1, 1912, in Havana, Cuba. Known as the Mississippi A&M Aggies at that time, the Bulldogs won by a final score of 12–0. Mississippi State does not count the victory against the athletic club among its bowl games and bowl wins.

From 1999 to 2011 Mississippi State had a 5-game winning streak in bowls. The streak ended against the Northwestern Wildcats in the 2013 Gator Bowl. The Bulldogs appeared in 13 straight bowl games for the first time in school history from 2010 to 2022.

Date	Coach	Bowl	Opponent	Result
1936	Ralph Sasse	Orange Bowl	Duquesne	L 12–13
1940	Allyn McKeen	Orange Bowl	Georgetown	W 14–7
1963	Paul E. Davis	Liberty Bowl	NC State	W 16–12
1974	Bob Tyler	Sun Bowl	North Carolina	W 26–24
1980	Emory Bellard	Sun Bowl	Nebraska	L 17–31
1981	Emory Bellard	Hall of Fame Classic	Kansas	W 10–0
1991	Jackie Sherrill	Liberty Bowl	Air Force	L 15–38
1992	Jackie Sherrill	Peach Bowl	North Carolina	L 17–21
1994	Jackie Sherrill	Peach Bowl	NC State	L 24–28
1998	Jackie Sherrill	Cotton Bowl Classic	Texas	L 11–38
1999	Jackie Sherrill	Peach Bowl	Clemson	W 17–7
2000	Jackie Sherrill	Independence Bowl	Texas A&M	W 43–41 ^{OT}
2007	Sylvester Croom	Liberty Bowl	UCF	W 10–3
2010	Dan Mullen	Gator Bowl	Michigan	W 52–14
2011	Dan Mullen	Music City Bowl	Wake Forest	W 23–17
2012	Dan Mullen	Gator Bowl	Northwestern	L 20–34
2013	Dan Mullen	Liberty Bowl	Rice	W 44–7
2014	Dan Mullen	Orange Bowl †	Georgia Tech	L 34–49
2015	Dan Mullen	Belk Bowl	NC State	W 51–28
2016	Dan Mullen	St. Petersburg Bowl	Miami (OH)	W 17–16
2017	Greg Knox (interim)	TaxSlayer Bowl	Louisville	W 31–27
2018	Joe Moorhead	Outback Bowl	Iowa	L 22–27
2019	Joe Moorhead	Music City Bowl	Louisville	L 28–38
2020	Mike Leach	Armed Forces Bowl	Tulsa	W 28–26
2021	Mike Leach	Liberty Bowl	Texas Tech	L 7–34
2022	Zach Arnett	ReliaQuest Bowl	Illinois	W 19–10
2025	Jeff Lebby	Duke's Mayo Bowl	Wake Forest	L 29–43

† New Year's Six bowl game

== Rivalries ==
=== Alabama ===
The Alabama–Mississippi State rivalry, sometimes referred to as the 90 Mile Drive or the Battle for Highway 82, is an annual football game between the Alabama Crimson Tide and the Mississippi State Bulldogs. Both universities are founding members of the Southeastern Conference in 1933, as well as the league's Western Division in 1992. The two campuses are located approximately 90 miles apart, and are the closest SEC schools in terms of proximity. With 108 games played as of the completion of the 2023 football season, Alabama–Mississippi State is one of the SEC's longest-running series, dating back to 1896. It is Alabama's most-played football series in its history and Mississippi State's third (behind only Ole Miss and LSU). With the SEC eliminating divisions after the 2023 season, the Bulldogs and Crimson Tide were not scheduled to play each other in 2024 while the conference determines a permanent scheduling format for 2025 and beyond. Barring a meeting in the 2024 SEC Championship Game, it will be the first season since 1947 that Alabama and Mississippi State won't meet on the football field.

=== LSU ===
The LSU–Mississippi State rivalry is an annual football game between the LSU Tigers and Mississippi State. In recent years, the rivalry has taken on the unofficial nickname of "Cajuns vs Cowbells". Both universities are founding members of the Southeastern Conference, as well as the Western Division. Played 117 times as of the completion of the 2023 season, this rivalry is LSU's most-played football series in its history and Mississippi State's second behind only Ole Miss. Mississippi State's 34–29 victory on September 20, 2014, was the Bulldogs' first over LSU since 1999, their first in Baton Rouge since 1991, and just their fourth overall since 1985. The 1976 game was won on the field by Mississippi State but later deemed by the NCAA to have been forfeited, therefore lost, by the Bulldogs. With the Southeastern Conference ending divisional play after the 2023 season, the Tigers and Bulldogs were not selected to play each other in the 2024 regular season, marking the first time since 1943 the teams did not play in a full season. LSU and MSU are also not scheduled to play in 2025 and can only meet in the SEC championship game.

=== Ole Miss ===
Mississippi State's biggest rival and most-played opponent in its history is in-state opponent Ole Miss. Known officially as the Egg Bowl since 1979, and also known prior to 1979 as the Battle for the Golden Egg, the Mississippi State–Ole Miss football rivalry is one of the fiercest in the Southeastern Conference. It was first played in 1901 and has been played every year since 1915 (with the exception of the 1943 season when neither school fielded teams due to World War II), making it the tenth-longest uninterrupted series in the United States. The game became "The Battle for the Golden Egg" in 1927 when a traveling trophy was added. Although through the years the game has been played primarily in three locations—Starkville (38 times), Oxford (36 times), and Jackson (29 times)—there have been a few meetings in other locations including Tupelo three times, Greenwood twice, Clarksdale once, and Columbus once. Through 2021, the two squads have met 118 times with Ole Miss holding a 64–45–6 lead in the series. The teams are founding members of the SEC and were both placed in the conference's Western Division in 1992 when the league split into divisions. The teams were selected to meet in 2024 and will play on the game's traditional Thanksgiving weekend date while the SEC determines a scheduling format for 2025 and beyond.

== All-time record vs. SEC teams ==
Opponent	Won	Lost	Tied	Percentage	Streak	First	Last
Alabama	18	87	3	.181	Lost 17	1896	2026
Arkansas	15	19	1	.443	Won 1	1916	2025
Auburn	29	67	3	.308	Lost 2	1905	2026
Florida	19	36	2	.351	Lost 3	1923	2025
Georgia	6	22	0	.214	Lost 6	1914	2025
Kentucky	25	26	0	.490	Lost 2	1914	2023
LSU	36	79	3	.318	Lost 4	1896	2026
Missouri	3	4	0	.429	Won 1	1981	2026
Ole Miss	47	67	6	.417	Lost 3	1901	2025
Oklahoma	0	1	0	.000	Lost 1	2026	2026
South Carolina	8	10	0	.444	Won 1	1992	2026
Tennessee	16	31	1	.344	Lost 3	1907	2025
Texas	2	5	0	.286	Lost 4	1921	2026
Texas A&M	9	10	0	.474	Lost 3	1912	2025
Vanderbilt	15	8	2	.640	Lost 1	1904	2026
Totals	247	472	21	.348			

== Ring of Honor Inductees ==
Inductee	Position	Number	Years played	Induction year
Johnie Cooks	Linebacker	99	1979-1982	2011
DD Lewis	Linebacker	53	1965-1967	2011
Jackie Parker	Quarterback	12	1952-1953	2011
Jack Cristil	Announcer		1953-2011	2011
Kent Hull	Center	58	1979-1982	2012
Tom "Shorty" McWilliams	Halfback	41	1944, 1946-1948	2014
Joe Fortunato	Linebacker	31	1950-1952	2017
Art Davis	Halfback	22	1952-1955	2018
Walt Harris	Cornerback	2	1992-1995	2018

== Traditions ==
=== The Cowbell ===
The cowbell is a long‑standing symbol and sound of Mississippi State athletics, and the tradition has persisted despite periodic attempts by opponents and authorities to curtail artificial noisemakers at games.

The precise origin is unclear; MSU’s official tradition materials note that the best records show cowbells gradually appearing at games in the late 1930s and early 1940s, coinciding with a pre‑WWII “golden age” of Mississippi State football. A popular legend holds that a wandering jersey cow walked onto the field during a home game against Ole Miss, after which State won and students began bringing the cow, and then just its bell, for luck—an origin story MSU records acknowledge as tradition even if not documentary fact.

By the 1950s cowbells were common at games, and by the 1960s they were established as a special symbol of Mississippi State; two MSU professors, Earl W. Terrell and Ralph L. Reeves, began welding handles to bells to make them easier to ring, after which student groups and the MSU Bookstore scaled up the handled‑bell supply and sales in the early 1960s. Today, multiple styles are sold in Starkville and beyond, and cowbells are commonly kept and passed down by Mississippi State fans and alumni.

In 1974 the SEC adopted a rule banning all artificial noisemakers at football and basketball games, a move often linked in contemporary and retrospective accounts to complaints from Auburn coach Shug Jordan and the 1974 Auburn–Mississippi State game atmosphere. Additional reporting recounts Jordan instructing his quarterback to pause a play amid crowd noise, other schools’ attempts to troll Auburn with cowbells, and even a Mississippi State faculty lawsuit over a confiscated bell—illustrating the tradition’s notoriety during the ban era.

In 2010, the SEC allowed cowbells back into Davis Wade Stadium on a one‑year trial with specific “ring responsibly” restrictions (e.g., pregame, timeouts, halftime, and after scores) and later permitted their continued use subject to those conditions, recognizing their role in MSU tradition.

=== Maroon and white ===
Maroon and White are the distinctive colors of Mississippi State University athletic teams, dating back over a century to the very first football game ever played by the school's student-athletes.

On November 15, 1895, the first Mississippi A&M football team was preparing for a road trip to Jackson, Tennessee., to play Southern Baptist University (now called Union University) the following day. Since every college was supposed to have its own uniform colors, the A&M student body requested that the school's team select a suitable combination.

Considering making this choice an honor, the inaugural State team gave the privilege to team captain W.M. Matthews. Accounts report that without hesitation Matthews chose Maroon and White.

== Recruiting ==
This table summarizes Mississippi State’s high‑school recruiting classes by 247Sports Composite team rank (Class/Rank/Commits) and lists the class’s highest‑rated commit as “Top Commit” (per 247Sports). Note: rankings and “top commit” designations can differ across services (e.g., On3/ESPN).

Class	Rank	Commits	Top Commit
2021	26	23	Sawyer Robertson
2020	27	23	Jo'Quavious Marks
2019	24	21	Charles Cross
2018	27	23	Devonta Jason
2017	24	25	Willie Gay
2016	28	20	Jeffery Simmons
2015	18	27	Jamal Peters
2014	36	24	Jamoral Graham
2013	24	21	Chris Jones
2012	22	28	Denico Autry
2011	41	23	Dee Arrington
2010	36	27	Damien Robinson
2009	18	28	Chad Bumphis
2008	43	15	Charles Mitchell
2007	25	32	Robert Elliott

== First-round NFL Draft picks ==
Mississippi State has had 16 players selected in the first round of the National Football League Draft.

- 1949 – Harper Davis
- 1956 – Art Davis
- 1959 – Billy Stacy
- 1975 – Jimmy Webb
- 1982 – Glen Collins and Johnie Cooks
- 1983 – Michael Haddix
- 1996 – Eric Moulds and Walt Harris
- 2011 – Derek Sherrod
- 2012 – Fletcher Cox
- 2019 – Jeffery Simmons, Montez Sweat and Johnathan Abram
- 2022 – Charles Cross
- 2023 – Emmanuel Forbes

== Coaching staff ==
=== Head coaches ===
The program has had 35 head coaches since it began play during the 1895 season, and has played more than 1,050 games over 111 seasons. From December 2008 though November 2017, Dan Mullen served as Mississippi State's head coach. Mike Leach was the head coach at Mississippi State from January 9, 2020, until his sudden death from heart complications on December 12, 2022. Defensive coordinator Zach Arnett was promoted to head coach on December 14, 2022 but was fired with two games remaining in the 2023 season.

=== Historic coaching hire ===
Mississippi State made history on December 1, 2003, when it hired Sylvester Croom as its head football coach. Croom was the first African-American named to such a position in the history of the Southeastern Conference (SEC).

== Future opponents ==
=== Conference opponents ===
On September 23, 2025, the SEC announced the conference opponents for Mississippi State from 2026 thru the 2029 seasons. The SEC earlier in 2025, announced the number of conference games will increase to 9 games instead of 8, starting with the 2026 season. This created a new conference schedule format whereas each team had been designated 3 permanent conference opponents each season and rotating the remaining 12 opponents in the four year period. Mississippi State's 3 permanent opponents is Alabama, Ole Miss and Vanderbilt.

2026	2027	2028	2029
Alabama	at Alabama	Alabama	at Alabama
Auburn	Arkansas	at Auburn	at Arkansas
at LSU	Florida	LSU	at Florida
Missouri	at Georgia	at Missouri	Georgia
at Ole Miss	at Kentucky	at Ole Miss	Kentucky
Oklahoma	Ole Miss	at Oklahoma	Ole Miss
at South Carolina	at Tennessee	South Carolina	Tennessee
at Texas	Texas A&M	Texas	at Texas A&M
Vanderbilt	at Vanderbilt	Vanderbilt	at Vanderbilt

=== Non-conference opponents ===
Announced schedules as of October 14, 2026. With the SEC new scheduling format, the conference requires each team to schedule a Power 4 team as one of its non-conference opponents.

2026	2027	2028	2029	2030	2031	2032	2033	2034
Louisiana–Monroe	Missouri State	North Alabama	West Georgia	at Oklahoma State	Arkansas State	Tulane	Chattanooga	Memphis
at Minnesota	Minnesota	Louisiana Tech	Southern Miss	Troy	Oklahoma State			
Tennessee Tech	Chattanooga							
