= Bully (mascot) =

Mascot of Mississippi State University

- Bully I
- University: Mississippi State University
- Conference: SEC
- Description: English Bulldog
- First seen: Unofficial – 1905; Official – 1935 (Ptolemy & Bully I)

Bully is the official mascot of the Mississippi State University Bulldogs in Starkville, Mississippi, and the name is given to both the costumed mascot and the live bulldog that appears at State games. The live mascot Bully is an American Kennel Club registered English Bulldog, and each dog is given the inherited title of "Bully". The name "Bully" is traditionally considered a title and not the official name of the specific dog that holds it.

== Association with the Bulldog ==
Mississippi State's athletics teams have had a variety of different nicknames throughout the years. The teams were called the "Aggies," as a reference to the school's agricultural roots as Mississippi A&M College. When the school officially became Mississippi State College in 1932, the teams adopted the nickname "Maroons," as that was the color of their uniforms. "Bulldogs" became the official nickname for State teams in 1961 after the school had been granted university status a few years prior, but use of the nickname dates back to at least 1905.

== Ptolemy ==
In 1935, Mississippi State head football coach Major Ralph Sasse acquired an English Bulldog in an effort to inspire his team. The dog was named "Ptolemy" (after the Greek mathematician and astronomer Claudius Ptolemy), and was affectionately nicknamed "Tol." The dog was "rented" from the Edgar Webster family in Memphis to serve as the team's mascot.

After Tol's arrival, Mississippi State defeated both Army (a college football powerhouse during that era) and Alabama. After the team posted an 8–3 record, State fans agreed that bringing on a mascot had been a good move, so Joe Rice Dockery (an alumnus and the proprietor of Dockery Farms), bought a bulldog named "Bully," a littermate of Ptolemy, and presented him to the school as a gift.

== Bully ==
Ptolemy's littermate became the first mascot called "Bully" shortly after Sasse's team beat mighty Army 13–7 at West Point that same year, perhaps the greatest victory in MSU football history. But Bully (retroactively named "Bully I") earned other fame the hard way, in November 1939 when he was struck and killed by a campus bus. The students held a funeral for Bully so elaborate that it was covered by LIFE magazine. Bully I was buried under the bench at the Scott Field 50-yard line.

Mascot	Name	Tenure
Bully I	"Bully"	1935–1939
Bully II	"Beau Legg"	1939–1940
Bully III	(unknown)	1942
Bully IV	"Big Dog on Campus" ("BDog")	1942–?
Bully V	(unknown)	1945–1947
Bully VI-A	"Big Dog on Campus" ("BDOC")	1947–1951
Bully VI-B	(unknown)	1947–1952
Bully VII	"Mr. Muggs"	1953–1956
Bully VIII	(unknown)	1957–1964
Bully IX	"Joker"	1964–1966
Bully X	"Sergeant Mac"	1967–1972
Bully XI	"Rebel"	1972
Bully XII	"Teeway's Romeo" ("Romeo")	1972
Bully XIII-A	"Trajan"	1974–1975
Bully XIII-B	"Sissy"	1974–1975
Bully XIV	"Champion Bully of MSU" ("Champ")	1976–1982
Bully XIV-B	(unknown)	1985–1991
Bully XV	"Little Bully"	1991–1992
Bully XVI	"Replica of Corker" ("Corker")	1992–1994
Bully XVII	"Lucky Be Happy" ("Lucky")	1995–1998
Bully XVIII	"Dontae"	1998–1999
Bully XIX	"Mississippi's TaTonka Gold" ("Tonka")	2001–2009
Bully XX	"TaTonka's Golden Sun" ("Champ")	2009–2015
Bully XXI	"Cristil's Golden Prince" ("Jak")	2015–2023
Bully XXII	"Dak"	2023–Present

Bully II ("Beau Legg", 1939–1940) was donated by Jayn Legg of Gulfport and served as mascot from 1939 until 1940, even presiding over an Orange Bowl win during his tenure, until he too met a tragic end after being struck by a bus. An elaborate funeral was also held in his honor, and he was interred at Hull Hall facing College Drive.

Bully III (1942) was donated to Mississippi State by J.W. Parker of West Point in March 1942, but little information exists as to his tenure as mascot, as he is never mentioned again after the July 1942 edition of The Reflector.

Bully IV ("Big Dog on Campus," 1942–?), called "B-Dog" for short, was purchased from Webster Kennels (the same kennel that bred Ptolemy and Bully I) in August 1942, but no record exists as to how long he served as mascot.

Bully V was a brindle bulldog purchased in July 1945 from a Greenwood resident by then-student body president David L. Cline. Despite his mascot status, the student newspaper was running advertisements to find him a home by January 1946. He served as mascot through March 1947 and died in 1951 due to "lack of exercise." He ended his tenure with a 14-5 (.736) overall record.

Bully VI was represented by two dogs. Mississippi State Athletics purchased one of the dogs ("Bully VI-A") from Sid Parker of West Point in September 1947 to serve as the mascot for the varsity football team. Similarly to Bully IV, he was named "Big Dog on Campus," but was affectionately known as "BDOC" for short. He was the first Mississippi State bulldog mascot to be "dog-napped"; prior to their game in October 1951, University of Georgia students dognapped Bully, but Mississippi State would persevere and win the football game 6–0. Photos from the Reveille yearbook show this Bully pulling on his leash, lunging toward opponent mascots including LSU's Mike the Tiger, the Baylor bear, and Alabama's live elephant Alamite. The other dog representing Bully VI ("Bully VI-B") was bought from Oklahoma City Kennels and given to the school as a gift in November 1947. This Bully served as the freshman team's mascot until BDOC's death in 1951, at which point Bully VI-B took over mascot duties for both the freshman and varsity teams through May 1952. The overall record for Bully VI (for both dogs) was a combined 19-25-2 (.431).

Bully VII ("Mr. Muggs") was a white bulldog provided in September 1953 by student Billy Underwood, who lived in Philadelphia. Due to repeated dog-nappings by students from rival schools Ole Miss and Southern Miss, he was allowed to return to Philadelphia with Underwood on the weekends as a protective measure. He served as mascot until November 1956.

Bully VIII was a dark brindle bulldog donated to Mississippi State by Alex Dittler of Atlanta through the Mack Trucks company. According to the Reveille, he is said to have lived the "longest, most neglected life of all Bullys." He was dognapped in 1958 by Ole Miss students, who painted him in red and blue lead-based paint and turned him loose at the Ole Miss-Mississippi State basketball game in Oxford. He almost died after being exposed to the lead paint, but he would survive and serve as mascot through 1964. He also presided over the team when Mississippi State College became "Mississippi State University," as well as when the teams officially became known as the "Bulldogs," in 1961. He also presided over the Bulldogs' 1963 Liberty Bowl victory over North Carolina State, which was also the first nationally televised game in school history. Upon his death, he was buried by the MSU Band Hall.

Bully IX ("Joker") was purchased by Lambda Chi Alpha in 1964. After it had been discovered that predecessor Bully VIII suffered a history of neglect, the fraternity assumed responsibility in taking care of the mascot and would oversee these duties until 1974. Joker served as mascot from 1964 to 1966.

Bully X ("Sergeant Mac") was the second mascot to serve under the care of the MSU Lambdas. This brindle bulldog served from 1967 until 1972, when he was fatally struck by a car on University Drive just before 1972 Homecoming.

Bully XI ("Rebel") was borrowed from a MSU alumnus to serve for a few games in 1972 after Bully X's death.

Bully XII ("Teeway's Romeo"), nicknamed "Romeo," was purchased by Lambda Chi Alpha shortly after Bully X's death, but he was "murdered" following the 1972 season. The perpetrators were never identified.

Bully XIII was also served by two dogs, a mother and son duo, both purchased in 1974 in Jackson. Bully XIII-A, named "Trajan," was the son, and he served from 1974 to 1975. He was once dognapped by Ole Miss students, but he was returned unharmed when the UM students discovered that he was undergoing treatment for stomach cancer. He would sire Bully XIV. Bully XIII-B, "Sissy," was Trajan's mother and the only female Bully in Mississippi State history. She too was dognapped by Ole Miss students, but was recovered when a female UM student tried to smuggle her into the Egg Bowl. Sissy served as mascot from 1974 to 1975, but would continue making infrequent appearances on the sideline with her grandson, Champ ("Bully XIV"), through 1977. The dogs that represented Bully XIII presided over State's 1974 Sun Bowl win over North Carolina.

Bully XIV ("Champion Bully of MSU"), called "Champ," was a piebald bulldog sired by Trajan through Molly, a bulldog owned by Mrs. Frazier Thompson, Jr. of Bentonia. He served as mascot from 1976 through 1982. A second bulldog, Bully XIV-B, served from 1985 to 1991. He presided over an upset of then-#1 ranked Alabama in 1980, a trip to the Sun Bowl, and a victory in the 1981 Hall of Fame Classic against the Kansas Jayhawks.

Bully XV ("Little Bully") served during the 1991 and 1992 seasons. He was bred by Dr. Joe G. Martin, owner and veterinarian at Martin Kennels of Ripley. Retired in 1992, Little Bully died in 1994 and was cremated. His ashes were scattered at Scott Field.

Bully XVI ("Replica of Corker"), known as "Corker," was a piebald brindle bulldog bred by Whitley Wilson of Eupora and served as mascot from 1992 to 1994. This bulldog sired the present-day line of Bully mascots.

Bully XVII ("Lucky Be Happy"), called "Lucky," was a fawn-colored bulldog that was sired by Corker and served as mascot from 1995 to 1998.

Bully XVIII ("Dontae") was donated by alumnus Greg Daly of Flowood in 1998. Dontae served as mascot from 1998 until 1999.

=== Bully XIX ("Tonka") ===
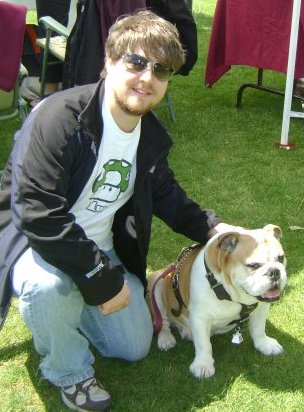
Bully XIX (Tonka) with student on the Drill Field

"Tonka" was the 19th English bulldog to assume the role of official mascot. Born in Waynesboro in 2000, Tonka is a descendant of Bully XVI ("Corker") and Bully XVII ("Lucky") and was registered by the American Kennel Club as "Mississippi's TaTonka Gold." Unlike his predecessors, Tonka was the first bulldog mascot owned by the university and trained into the role from the time he was 8 weeks old.

In 2006, he sired Bully XX ("Champ"), who took over his father's duties as MSU's mascot in September 2009 and served until April 18, 2015. Tonka died on June 28, 2011, at the age of 11.

=== Bully XX ("Champ") ===
"Champ" was the 20th English bulldog to serve as the official mascot of Mississippi State University. Champ was sired by TaTonka Gold (Bully XIX) on September 24, 2006. He was registered by the American Kennel Club under the name "TaTonka's Golden Sun." In October 2014, Champ sired the next Mississippi State mascot, Bully XXI (Jak), who assumed mascot duties following the Maroon and White Spring Game on April 18, 2015. Champ retired with an overall record of 46-31 (.597), featuring wins in the Gator Bowl, Music City Bowl, and Liberty Bowl during his tenure, as well as a trip to the Orange Bowl and the first #1 poll ranking ever achieved by Mississippi State football. Champ died on August 21, 2016.

=== Bully XXI ("Jak") ===
Jak was the 21st English Bulldog to serve as the official mascot of Mississippi State University. His formal name is "Cristil's Golden Prince" named in honor of the long-time radio voice Jack Cristil. Jak was sired by "Champ" (Bully XX) in October 2014. He took over for Champ on Saturday, April 18, 2015, at the Maroon and White spring football game.

=== Bully XXII ("Dak") ===
Dak is the 22nd English Bulldog to serve as the official mascot of Mississippi State University. His formal name is "Mississippi State Gold N Son Prescott", nicknamed, "Dak". In late March 2023, Mississippi State University announced the next English Bulldog in the line of live mascots. Taking his name from previous Mississippi State quarterback & current Dallas Cowboys quarterback Dak Prescott, "Dak" (Bully XXII) took over mascot duties from the current mascot "Jak" (Bully XXI) on April 15, 2023, at halftime of the 2023 Spring Football game during Super Bulldog Weekend. The ceremony included the "passing of the harness" and blessing ceremony. "Dak" was born March 1, 2021 and is owned by Julie & Bruce Martin of Meridian, MS. "He is very playful. He wants to be around other people," said Julie Martin, his owner. "He will exhaust himself, actually, to just go to every single person." Whether roaming the sidelines at Davis Wade Stadium, soaking in the sights and sounds at The Dude, or guarding the baseline at The Hump, “Dak” looks forward to looking out onto the sea of maroon and white for MSU sporting events, living out any Bulldog’s dream. He is proud to represent Mississippi State University and one of the Bulldogs’ greatest football players by continuing one of MSU’s greatest traditions.

== Costumed Bully ==
Bully & Belle at a 2026 football game.

The first costumed mascot appeared at Mississippi State during the 1964–1965 school year. By 1971, a more professional costume was created and the character was, like the live bulldog, called "Bully." Throughout the early 1970s, Bully was a white bulldog with a brindled patch around one of his eyes and a spiked collar around his neck.

By the mid-1970s, Bully's look changed again so that he had dark brown fur and no collar. In 1980, a more cartoonish Bully graced the sidelines at Mississippi State games, one that looks similar to the one seen in the present day. During the early 1980s, he typically wore a tank top and/or maroon or white shorts if wearing any clothes at all, but as years passed, he more frequently wore Mississippi State's uniform for whatever sport he was appearing at.

Today, Bully's team consists of six students plus an alternate. Each Bully receives $800 per semester scholarship for their first year and $1,000 per semester scholarship for each additional year as a team member, as well as camp clothes, camp fees, mascot uniforms and travel expenses.

Beginning the 2008–2009 school year, Mississippi State added a Bully mascot to its Meridian campus. The Meridian campus Bully also attends UCA College Mascot camp and receives camp clothes, a mascot uniform, and a $150 per semester scholarship.

Bully gained national attention in 2013 after being struck by an ESPN cart during that season's Egg Bowl game between Mississippi State and Ole Miss. The student wearing the suit had to be carted off the field on a stretcher and subsequently underwent two surgeries for a compound fracture. The student later sued ESPN and Mississippi State for more than $75,000 in damages, claiming negligence on the part of ESPN and the university.

== See also ==
- List of individual dogs
