= 1994 US Open – Men's doubles =

Men's doubles
- 1994 US Open

Final
- Champion: (Netherlands) Jacco Eltingh (Netherlands) Paul Haarhuis
- Runner-up: (Australia) Todd Woodbridge (Australia) Mark Woodforde
- Score: 6–3, 7–6^{(7–1)}

Details
- Draw: 64
- Seeds: 16

Events
Singles	men	women		boys	girls
Doubles	men	women	mixed	boys	girls
WC Singles	men	women	quad
WC Doubles	men	women	quad
Legends	men	women	mixed
- US Open

The 1994 US Open was a tennis tournament played on outdoor hard courts at the USTA National Tennis Center in New York City in New York in the United States. It was the 114th edition of the US Open and was held from August 29 to September 11, 1994.

== Seeds ==
Champion seeds are indicated in bold text while text in italics indicates the round in which those seeds were eliminated.

1. (Zimbabwe) Byron Black / (United States) Jonathan Stark (third round)
2. (Canada) Grant Connell / (United States) Patrick Galbraith (first round)
3. (Netherlands) **Jacco Eltingh** / (Netherlands) **Paul Haarhuis (champions)**
4. (Australia) Todd Woodbridge / (Australia) Mark Woodforde (final)
5. (South Africa) David Adams / (Russia) Andrei Olhovskiy (quarterfinals)
6. (Sweden) Jan Apell / (Sweden) Jonas Björkman (first round)
7. (United States) Patrick McEnroe / (United States) Jared Palmer (quarterfinals)
8. (Netherlands) Tom Nijssen / (Czech Republic) Cyril Suk (quarterfinals)
9. (Russia) Yevgeny Kafelnikov / (Czech Republic) David Rikl (first round)
10. (United States) Scott Melville / (South Africa) Piet Norval (first round)
11. (Sweden) Henrik Holm / (Sweden) Anders Järryd (first round)
12. Unknown (withdrew)
13. (Spain) Sergio Casal / (Spain) Emilio Sánchez (second round)
14. (United States) Alex O'Brien / (Australia) Sandon Stolle (third round)
15. (Netherlands) Menno Oosting / (Czech Republic) Daniel Vacek (first round)
16. (South Africa) Wayne Ferreira / (The Bahamas) Mark Knowles (semifinals)

== Draw ==
Key

- Q = Qualifier
- WC = Wild card
- LL = Lucky loser
- Alt = Alternate
- ITF = ITF entry
- PR = Protected ranking
- SR = Special ranking
- SE = Special exempt
- JE = Junior exempt
- JR = Junior Accelerator Programme entrant
- CO = College Accelerator Programme entrant
- NG = Next Gen Accelerator Program entrant
- w/o = Walkover
- r = Retired
- d = Defaulted

=== Finals ===
Quarterfinals
(Sweden) **Nicklas Kulti** **(Sweden) Magnus Larsson**	**6**	**6**
7	(United States) Patrick McEnroe (United States) Jared Palmer	4	4
4	(Australia) **Todd Woodbridge** **(Australia) Mark Woodforde**	**6**	**7**
(Czech Republic) Martin Damm (Czech Republic) Karel Nováček	3	6
5	(South Africa) David Adams (Russia) Andrei Olhovskiy	6	**7**	6
3	(Netherlands) **Jacco Eltingh** **(Netherlands) Paul Haarhuis**	**7**	5	**7**
8	(Netherlands) Tom Nijssen (Czech Republic) Cyril Suk	3	4
16	(South Africa) **Wayne Ferreira** **(The Bahamas) Mark Knowles**	**6**	**6**

Semifinals
4	(Australia) **Todd Woodbridge** **(Australia) Mark Woodforde**	**6**	**7**
(Sweden) Nicklas Kulti (Sweden) Magnus Larsson	3	6
16	(South Africa) Wayne Ferreira (The Bahamas) Mark Knowles	3	5
3	(Netherlands) **Jacco Eltingh** **(Netherlands) Paul Haarhuis**	**6**	**7**

Final
4	(Australia) Todd Woodbridge (Australia) Mark Woodforde	3	6
3	(Netherlands) **Jacco Eltingh** **(Netherlands) Paul Haarhuis**	**6**	**7**

=== Top half ===
==== Section 1 ====
First round
1	(Zimbabwe) **B Black** **(United States) J Stark**	**6**	**7**
(United States) B Devening (Zimbabwe) K Ullyett	1	5
(Australia) **D Cahill** **(Australia) J Fitzgerald**	**6**	**7**
(Italy) D Nargiso (Sweden) P Nyborg	3	6
(United States) **D Johnson** **(United States) K Thorne**	**7**	**6**
(United States) K Kinnear (United States) D Wheaton	6	4
(Sweden) **N Kulti** **(Sweden) M Larsson**	**6**	6	**6**
15	(Netherlands) M Oosting (Czech Republic) D Vacek	2	**7**	3
(United States) **L Jensen** **(United States) M Jensen**	**6**	**7**
10	(United States) S Melville (South Africa) P Norval	2	6
(Australia) **P Rafter** **(United States) B Shelton**	**6**	**6**
(Belgium) L Pimek (United States) J Waite	3	2
(Canada) **S Lareau** **(India) L Paes**	2	**6**	**7**
(South Africa) M Ondruska (South Africa) B Talbot	**6**	3	6
7	(United States) **P McEnroe** **(United States) J Palmer**	**6**	**6**
(United States) D Flach (United States) K Flach	2	2

Second round
1	(Zimbabwe) **B Black** **(United States) J Stark**	**6**	**6**
(Australia) D Cahill (Australia) J Fitzgerald	1	3
(United States) D Johnson (United States) K Thorne	**7**	2	3
(Sweden) **N Kulti** **(Sweden) M Larsson**	5	**6**	**6**
(United States) **L Jensen** **(United States) M Jensen**	**6**	**6**
(Australia) P Rafter (United States) B Shelton	3	2
(Canada) S Lareau (India) L Paes	2	4
7	(United States) **P McEnroe** **(United States) J Palmer**	**6**	**6**

Third round
1	(Zimbabwe) B Black (United States) J Stark	5	3
(Sweden) **N Kulti** **(Sweden) M Larsson**	**7**	**6**
(United States) L Jensen (United States) M Jensen	1	2
7	(United States) **P McEnroe** **(United States) J Palmer**	**6**	**6**

Quarterfinals
(Sweden) **N Kulti** **(Sweden) M Larsson**	**6**	**6**
7	(United States) P McEnroe (United States) J Palmer	4	4

==== Section 2 ====
First round
4	(Australia) **T Woodbridge** **(Australia) M Woodforde**	**6**	**6**
(United States) B Garnett (Mexico) J Lozano	3	2
(Spain) **T Carbonell** **(Spain) F Roig**	**6**	**6**
(South Africa) S Kruger (United States) B Pearce	4	2
(South Africa) **E Ferreira** **(United States) D Randall**	1	**6**	**6**
(The Bahamas) M Merklein (United States) V Spadea	**6**	4	4
14	(United States) **A O'Brien** **(Australia) S Stolle**	**6**	**6**
(United States) J Grabb (United States) R Reneberg	3	4
(Czech Republic) **M Damm** **(Czech Republic) K Nováček**	**6**	**6**
(Canada) B Gyetko (South Africa) D Nainkin	4	4
(Austria) **A Antonitsch** **(Sweden) L-A Wahlgren**	**6**	**6**
(France) J-P Fleurian (France) S Simian	4	4
(United States) **R Leach** **(South Africa) D Visser**	**6**	**6**
(France) L Miquelard (United States) J Simmons	0	1
(South Africa) **L Bale** **(New Zealand) B Steven**	2	**7**	**6**
6	(Sweden) J Apell (Sweden) J Björkman	**6**	5	3

Second round
4	(Australia) **T Woodbridge** **(Australia) M Woodforde**	w/o
(Spain) T Carbonell (Spain) F Roig
(South Africa) E Ferreira (United States) D Randall	1	**6**	0
14	(United States) **A O'Brien** **(Australia) S Stolle**	**6**	3	**6**
(Czech Republic) **M Damm** **(Czech Republic) K Nováček**	**6**	**7**
(Austria) A Antonitsch (Sweden) L-A Wahlgren	3	;5
(United States) R Leach (South Africa) D Visser	**6**	3	4
(South Africa) **L Bale** **(New Zealand) B Steven**	2	**6**	**6**

Third round
4	(Australia) **T Woodbridge** **(Australia) M Woodforde**	**6**	**6**
14	(United States) A O'Brien (Australia) S Stolle	4	4
(Czech Republic) **M Damm** **(Czech Republic) K Nováček**	**6**	0	**7**
(South Africa) L Bale (New Zealand) B Steven	2	**6**	6

Quarterfinals
4	(Australia) **T Woodbridge** **(Australia) M Woodforde**	**6**	**7**
(Czech Republic) M Damm (Czech Republic) K Nováček	3	6

=== Bottom half ===
==== Section 3 ====
First round
5	(South Africa) **D Adams** **(Russia) A Olhovskiy**	**6**	**6**
(Argentina) J-I Garat (Netherlands) J Siemerink	3	3
(France) **O Delaître** **(France) G Forget**	**6**	4	**7**
(United Kingdom) N Broad (United States) G Van Emburgh	4	**6**	6
(United States) **S Davis** **(United States) D Pate**	**6**	**6**
(Netherlands) HJ Davids (Netherlands) S Noteboom	2	3
(United States) **P Annacone** **(United States) S Cannon**	**7**	2	**6**
11	(Sweden) H Holm (Sweden) A Järryd	6	**6**	1
13	(Spain) **S Casal** **(Spain) E Sánchez**	**7**	**6**
(United States) F Montana (United States) J Pugh	6	2
(South Africa) **J-L de Jager** **(South Africa) G Stafford**	3	**6**	**6**
(Argentina) P Albano (Venezuela) M Ruah	**6**	4	4
(United States) **B MacPhie** **(United States) D Witt**	**7**	**7**
(Australia) A Florent (Australia) P Kilderry	5	6
3	(Netherlands) **J Eltingh** **(Netherlands) P Haarhuis**	**7**	**6**
(United States) P Goldstein (United States) S Humphries	6	4

Second round
5	(South Africa) **D Adams** **(Russia) A Olhovskiy**	**7**	6	**6**
(France) O Delaître (France) G Forget	5	**7**	3
(United States) S Davis (United States) D Pate	4	**7**	2
(United States) **P Annacone** **(United States) S Cannon**	**6**	5	**6**
13	(Spain) S Casal (Spain) E Sánchez	2	4
(South Africa) **J-L de Jager** **(South Africa) G Stafford**	**6**	**6**
(United States) B MacPhie (United States) D Witt	**6**	6	5
3	(Netherlands) **J Eltingh** **(Netherlands) P Haarhuis**	1	**7**	**7**

Third round
5	(South Africa) **D Adams** **(Russia) A Olhovskiy**	**6**	**6**
(United States) P Annacone (United States) S Cannon	1	4
(South Africa) J-L de Jager (South Africa) G Stafford	1	2
3	(Netherlands) **J Eltingh** **(Netherlands) P Haarhuis**	**6**	**6**

Quarterfinals
5	(South Africa) D Adams (Russia) A Olhovskiy	6	**7**	6
3	(Netherlands) **J Eltingh** **(Netherlands) P Haarhuis**	**7**	5	**7**

==== Section 4 ====
First round
8	(Netherlands) **T Nijssen** **(Czech Republic) C Suk**	6	**6**	**6**
(Venezuela) N Pereira (Spain) J Sánchez	**7**	3	2
(South Africa) **M Barnard** **(South Africa) B Haygarth**	**6**	**6**
(Italy) C Brandi (Italy) F Mordegan	4	3
(United States) **W McGuire** **(United States) J Tarango**	**6**	**6**
(United States) M Bauer (Germany) A Mronz	3	4
(Sweden) **R Bergh** **(United States) M Keil**	**6**	**6**
9	(Russia) Y Kafelnikov (Czech Republic) D Rikl	4	4
16	(South Africa) **W Ferreira** **(The Bahamas) M Knowles**	**6**	3	**7**
(Australia) A Kratzmann (Australia) M Kratzmann	4	**6**	6
(United States) **T Kronemann** **(Australia) D Macpherson**	**6**	**6**
(Morocco) K Alami (United States) T Nelson	4	4
(Canada) **D Nestor** **(United Kingdom) G Rusedski**	**6**	**6**
(United States) I Baron (United States) M Blackman	4	1
(United States) **K Jones** **(United States) M Lucena**	**6**	**6**
2	(Canada) G Connell (United States) P Galbraith	4	4

Second round
8	(Netherlands) **T Nijssen** **(Czech Republic) C Suk**	**6**	**6**
(South Africa) M Barnard (South Africa) B Haygarth	3	4
(United States) W McGuire (United States) J Tarango	5	6
(Sweden) **R Bergh** **(United States) M Keil**	**7**	**7**
16	(South Africa) **W Ferreira** **(The Bahamas) M Knowles**	**6**	6	**6**
(United States) T Kronemann (Australia) D Macpherson	3	**7**	3
(Canada) D Nestor (United Kingdom) G Rusedski	3	4
(United States) **K Jones** **(United States) M Lucena**	**6**	**6**

Third round
8	(Netherlands) **T Nijssen** **(Czech Republic) C Suk**	6	**6**	**6**
(Sweden) R Bergh (United States) M Keil	**7**	4	3
16	(South Africa) **W Ferreira** **(The Bahamas) M Knowles**	**6**	4	**7**
(United States) K Jones (United States) M Lucena	3	**6**	6

Quarterfinals
8	(Netherlands) T Nijssen (Czech Republic) C Suk	3	4
16	(South Africa) **W Ferreira** **(The Bahamas) M Knowles**	**6**	**6**
