= Paul E. Davis =

American football player and coach (1922–2009)

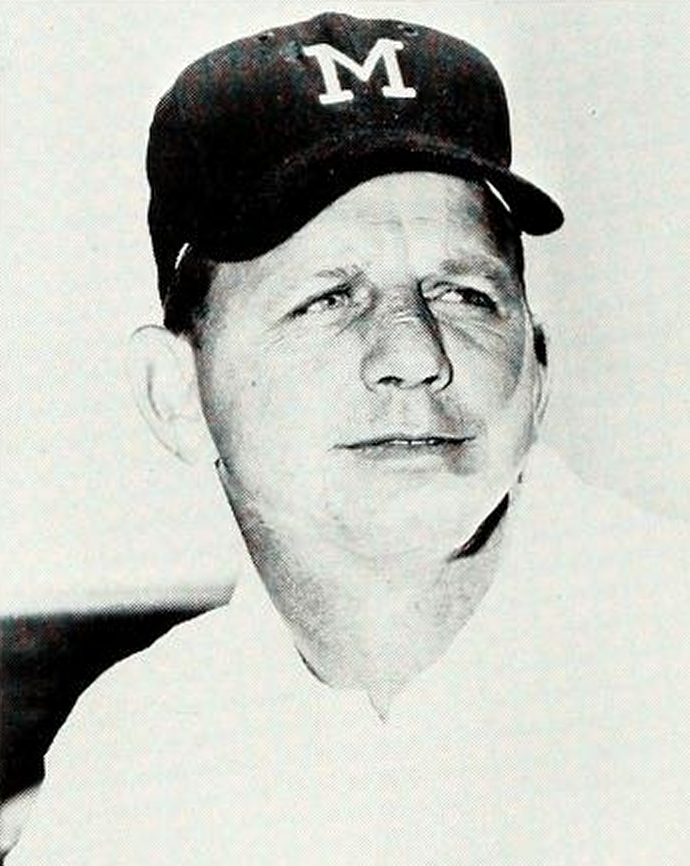
- Davis pictured in Reveille 1963, Mississippi State yearbook

Biographical details
- Born: February 3, 1922
- Died: March 31, 2009 (aged 87); Auburn, Alabama, U.S.

Playing career
- 1942: Ole Miss
- 1946: Ole Miss
- Position: Center

Coaching career (HC unless noted)
- 1950–1954: Jones County
- 1960–1961: Mississippi State (assistant)
- 1962–1966: Mississippi State
- 1967–1980: Auburn (assistant)
- 1981–1982: Alabama (recruiting)
- 1983–1985: Temple (assistant)
- 1987–1990: Auburn (assistant)

Head coaching record
- Overall: 20–28–2 (college); 34–11–3 (junior college)
- Bowls: 1–0

Accomplishments and honors

Awards
- SEC Coach of the Year (1963)

Paul E. Davis (February 3, 1922 – March 31, 2009) was an American college football player and coach. He served as the head football coach at Mississippi State University from 1962 to 1966, compiling a record of 20–28–2.

== Playing career ==
Davis grew up in Knoxville, Tennessee, and attended Young High School there, where he was selected as caption of the school's football team in both 1940 and 1941. During World War II, he served in the United States Army in Europe. He played college football at the University of Mississippi after completing his military service.

== Coaching career ==
Davis was head coach at New Albany High School in New Albany, Mississippi, before taking the reins of the Jones County Junior College football team, leading the Bobcats to a 9–0–1 mark and a state championship in 1951. He compiled a 34–11–3 record while coaching the team at Jones County Junior College from 1950 to 1954. He left to take a position as coach at Memphis State University, among other schools, before heading to Mississippi State University under head coach Wade Walker.

He was the head coach of the Mississippi State Bulldogs football team from 1962 until 1966, with his teams going 20–38–2 overall and 9–22–2 in the Southeastern Conference in those five seasons. The team had a 7–2–2 record in 1963, earning its first postseason bowl game since 1939. The team finished the season with a 16–12 victory over North Carolina State in front of 8,309 fans at the 1963 Liberty Bowl played in a bitter cold Philadelphia. Mississippi State was able to convert two botched North Carolina State punts into touchdowns, and a 13–0 lead at the first quarter. United Press International named Davis the SEC Coach of the Year for the 1963 season. After a 2–8 record in the 1966 season, Mississippi State dismissed Davis, as well as athletic director Wade Walker. Charles Shira, who had been defensive coach for the University of Texas, was named to fill both vacant positions.

He was defensive coordinator and assistant head coach, among other positions, for the Auburn Tigers football team under Ralph Jordan (1967 to 1975), Doug Barfield (1976 to 1980) and Pat Dye (1987 to 1990), spending a total of 17 years with the team.

== Death ==
Davis died at age 87 on March 31, 2009, at a hospice in Auburn, Alabama. He was survived by two children and two grandchildren.

== Head coaching record ==
=== College ===
Year	Team	Overall	Conference	Standing	Bowl/playoffs	Coaches^{#}
Mississippi State Bulldogs (Southeastern Conference) (1962–1966)
1962	Mississippi State	3–6	2–5	9th		
1963	Mississippi State	7–2–2	4–1–2	4th	W Liberty	11
1964	Mississippi State	4–6	2–5	8th		
1965	Mississippi State	4–6	1–5	T–9th		
1966	Mississippi State	2–8	0–6	T–9th		
Mississippi State:		20–28–2	9–22–2			
Total:		20–28–2				
^{#}Rankings from final Coaches Poll.
