= Mississippi State Bulldogs women's volleyball =

Women's volleyball team of Mississippi State Bulldogs

- Founded: 1975
- University: Mississippi State University
- Head coach: Julie Darty Dennis (9th season)
- Conference: SEC
- Location: Starkville
- Home arena: Newell–Grissom Building (capacity: 2,000)
- Nickname: Bulldogs
- Colors: Maroon and white

AIAW/NCAA tournament appearance
- 2021

The Mississippi State Bulldogs women's volleyball is the official team who represents Mississippi State University in intercollegiate women's volleyball competition. Mississippi State competed at the NCAA Division I level as a member of the Southeastern Conference (SEC). The Bulldogs have been led by head coach Julie Darty Dennis since the 2018 season.

== History ==
The program became an official varsity sport in 1975, and has been to the NCAA Division I women's volleyball tournament once. As of 2025, 13 players have earned All-SEC honors, 11 have earned American Volleyball Coaches Association (AVCA) All-Region and four have been named All-Americans.

Year	Head Coach	Overall Record	Conference Record	Conference Standing	Postseason
(Mississippi Association for Intercollegiate Athletics (MAIAW)) (1975–1980)
1975	Ginger Hale	12–13	-	-	-
1976	Ginger Hale	22–12	-	-	-
1977	Lize Dye	8–12	-	-	-
1978	Lize Dye	12–17	-	-	-
1979	Gina Jacobellis	14–22	-	-	-
1980	Gina Jacobellis	21–16	-	-	-
(SEC) (1981–present)
1981	Lynn Keiser	6–22	-	-	-
1982	Lynn Keiser	7–33	-	-	-
1983	Vivian Langley	7–29	0–5	6th	-
1984	Vivian Langley	18–20	1–5	T-5th	-
1985	Vivian Langley	9–29	0–6	7th	-
1986	Mike Tucker	15–23	0–6	7th	-
1987	Mike Tucker	12–26	0–7	8th	-
1988	Mike Tucker	17–19	0–7	8th	-
1989	Mike Tucker	20–14	1–7	8th	-
1990	Mike Tucker	17–13	1–7	8th	-
1991	Mike Tucker	15–20	3–11	9th	-
1992	Mike Tucker	17–16	0–14	10th	-
1993	Mike Tucker	15–19	4–10	T-7th	-
1994	Samye Johnson	12–20	3–12	10th	-
1995	Samye Johnson	16–18	3–12	10th	-
1996	Samye Johnson	18–19	3–12	10th	-
1997	Brenda Bowlin	12–22	4–11	9th	-
1998	Brenda Bowlin	9–20	5–10	T-8th	-
1999	Brenda Bowlin	11–16	2–13	10th	-
2000	Brenda Bowlin	16–14	3–12	T-10th	-
2001	Brenda Bowlin	8–17	3–12	T-9th	-
2002	Brenda Bowlin	10–20	1–15	10th	-
2003	Brenda Bowlin	3–23	2–14	10th	-
2004	Tina Seals	14–16	5–11	T-8th	-
2005	Tina Seals	15–12	6–10	7th	-
2006	Tina Seals	17–13	8–12	T-8th	-
2007	Tina Seals	12–17	7–13	T-8th	-
2008	Tina Seals	6–25	1–19	T-10th	-
2009	Jenny Hazelwood	9–22	5–15	T-9th	-
2010	Jenny Hazelwood	11–20	3–17	T-10th	-
2011	Jenny Hazelwood	12–17	7–13	t6th	-
2012	Jenny Hazelwood	4–25	0–20	13th	-
2013	Jenny Hazelwood	12–20	3–15	T-11th	-
2014	Jenny Hazelwood	7–26	2–16	12th	-
2015	David McFatrich	17–15	6–12	10th	-
2016	David McFatrich	14–18	6–12	11th	-
2017	David McFatrich	10–23	1–17	13th	-
2018	Julie Darty Dennis	5–26	1–17	13th	-
2019	Julie Darty Dennis	13–17	2–16	12th	-
2020	Julie Darty Dennis	5–15	5–15	11th	-
2021	Julie Darty Dennis	25–6	16–2	2nd	NCAA 1st Round
2022	Julie Darty Dennis	15–13	8–10	8th	-
2023	Julie Darty Dennis	13–15	6–12	9th	-
2024	Julie Darty Dennis	11–14	5–11	13th	-
2025	Julie Darty Dennis	16–10	6–9	T-10th	-
Total		642–949	148–502		

== See also ==
- List of NCAA Division I women's volleyball programs
