= Zac Selmon =

American sports administrator (born 1985)

Current position
- Title: Athletic director
- Team: Mississippi State
- Conference: SEC

Biographical details
- Born: November 23, 1984 (age 41); Norman, Oklahoma, U.S.
- Education: Wake Forest University (BA); University of Oklahoma (MEd)

Playing career
- 2003–2007: Wake Forest
- Position: Tight end

Administrative career (AD unless noted)
- 2009–2011: Oklahoma (assistant director of athletics development)
- 2011–2014: Oklahoma (associate director of athletics development)
- 2014–2015: North Carolina (associate athletic director/special assistant to the AD)
- 2015–2017: Oklahoma (senior associate athletic director/chief of operations)
- 2017–2021: Oklahoma (senior associate athletic director for administration and development)
- 2021–2023: Oklahoma (deputy athletic director for external engagement and advancement)
- 2023–present: Mississippi State

Zac Selmon (born November 23, 1985) is the current athletic director for the Mississippi State University Bulldogs.

== Playing career ==
Selmon was a tight end for the Wake Forest Demon Deacons football team from 2003 to 2007, starting four years after redshirting in 2003. Wake Forest won their second ACC championship in school history in 2006.

== Administrative career ==
Selmon filled various assistant athletic positions at Oklahoma, and a brief stint at North Carolina before returning to Oklahoma, prior to his appointment as athletic director at Mississippi State.

== Personal life ==
A native of Norman, Oklahoma, Selmon attended Norman High School. He is the son of Dewey Selmon and the nephew of first overall NFL draft pick Lee Roy Selmon and Lucious Selmon, who combined to form the defensive line at Oklahoma during their college years.
