= Famous Maroon Band =

Marching band of Mississippi State University

- School: Mississippi State University
- Location: Starkville, Mississippi
- Conference: SEC
- Founded: 1902
- Director: Elva Kaye Lance
- Assistant Directors: Clifton Taylor and Craig Aarhus
- Members: 430 (2026)
- Fight song: "Hail State"

The Famous Maroon Band is a marching band at Mississippi State University in Starkville, Mississippi. The Famous Maroon Band plays at all Mississippi State home football games and sends at least a pep band to a majority of the football away games (except for ones that are too far to travel to, such as when Mississippi State played at Arizona in 2022). Typically, the full band also travels to bowl games, the Egg Bowl against the University of Mississippi, and at least one other away game per season. The band was formally established in 1902 at what was then called Mississippi A&M College and was a military band, as was the college at the time. The Famous Maroon Band was awarded the Sudler Trophy in 2026.

== "Famous" name ==
The name "Famous Maroon Band" was coined in the 1930s after an incident that led to the 40 members of the band being called the "Famous Forty". At the time of an A&M vs. Alabama football game, the bands participated in a band contest with the winner taking home a trophy. Unbeknownst to the Alabama band, the A&M band had brand new non-military themed uniforms and after the A&M band performed first to thunderous applause the Alabama band refused to play. The band still has the trophy on display in the band room and the forty members of the band were thenceforth nicknamed the "Famous Forty". Later on in the 1930s a sportswriter referred to the band as the "Famous Maroon Band" and the name stuck.

Listen to "Hail State"
Famous Maroon Band
Download Now

== Traditions ==
=== The Junction ===
In the university's new Junction area outside Davis Wade Stadium, the Famous Maroon Band performs and cheers on the crowds and the team at Dawg Walk. The MSU Drumline also performs in exhibition in front of the Leo Seal M Club Centre two hours before kickoff. One hour before the game begins, the band parades through the Junction into Davis Wade Stadium.

Watch Pregame Performances
Famous Maroon Band
Watch Now

=== Pregame ===
Before kickoff at Davis Wade Stadium, the band performs its annual pregame show. An entrance video is shown on the video board while the percussion section takes the field. The band then runs onto the field to the pregame cadence, followed by the MSU Fanfare. The band scatters into the MSU spellout and plays the MSU 2K cheer, followed by Hail State and Madelon, the original fight song for Mississippi State. The band then plays a patriotic song that is changed every few years, currently American Celebration (You're a Grand Ole Flag), during the presentation of the colors, which is followed by the Star Spangled Banner. The band then scatters into the STATE spellout while Davis Wade Stadium erupts with ringing cowbells. The Go State cheer is played, followed by Hail State and The Hey Song, which concludes the performance. As the team enters, Hail State is played one more time before exiting the field.

Watch the 2006 "Salute to America"
Famous Maroon Band
Watch Now

=== Halftime ===
During halftime, the band performs selected songs which all have a specific theme and style. The band also features special performances, like High School Band Day, the Alumni Band, and the annual "Salute to America" patriotic spectacular, which honors veterans and current men and women serving in the armed forces. After each performance, the band plays some form of cheer (usually Go State or Hail State) before exiting the field.
