= Hail State =

Fight song at the Mississippi State University

"Hail State" is the fight song and rally cry of Mississippi State University. The lyrics and music was written by Joseph Burleson Peavey in 1939. The title of the song was adopted as the official domain name for Mississippi State athletics along with all social media platforms owned by the athletic department in 2014.

== Rally Cry ==
Hail State, as the rally cry of the athletic program at Mississippi State, began to rise in popularity around 2010. With the rise in prominence of the football team under Coach Dan Mullen and a major marketing push from the Athletic Department, the phrase began making its way into the everyday lexicon of the Mississippi State fan base.

== Social media ==
Hail State became the official hashtag of Mississippi State Athletics and Academics around the 2010 football season. It has trended nationally and internationally at different momentous moments in the recent athletic history of the university.

Mississippi State was the first university to paint a hashtag (#hailstate) onto a playing surface. The football program painted #hailstate in the north end zone at Davis-Wade Stadium. This act and future hashtags was later banned by the NCAA for all institutions.

== Use in football games ==
Hail State is played by the Famous Maroon Band at the start of each home game and after each time the team scores. There are several abbreviated versions that are played as stand tunes or in combination with the full theme.

== Lyrics ==
Hail dear ol' State! Fight for that victory today. Hit that line and tote that ball, Cross the goal before you fall! And then we'll yell, yell, yell, yell! For dear ol' State we'll yell like H-E-L-L! Fight for Mis-sis-sip-pi State, Win that game today!

== Alternate last line ==
Many Mississippi State fans replace the last line "Win the game today!" with "Go to hell Ole Miss!", a tongue-in-cheek jab at their rivals. Fans have also been known to shout this at the end of the U.S. National Anthem, regardless of the game, sport or team playing.
