= Joc Simmons =

American tennis player

- Country (sports): United States

Doubles
- Career record: 0–1
- Highest ranking: No. 680 (Aug 21, 1995)

Grand Slam doubles results
- US Open: 1R (1994)

Joc Simmons is an American former professional tennis player.

Raised in Tulsa, Oklahoma, Simmons played two seasons of collegiate tennis at the University of Oklahoma and won a Big Eight title both years. Transferring to Mississippi State, he partnered with Laurent Miquelard to win the 1994 NCAA doubles championship. The pair received a place in the doubles main draw of the 1994 US Open.
