= Davis Wade Stadium =

Stadium at Mississippi State University

Davis Wade Stadium at Scott Field
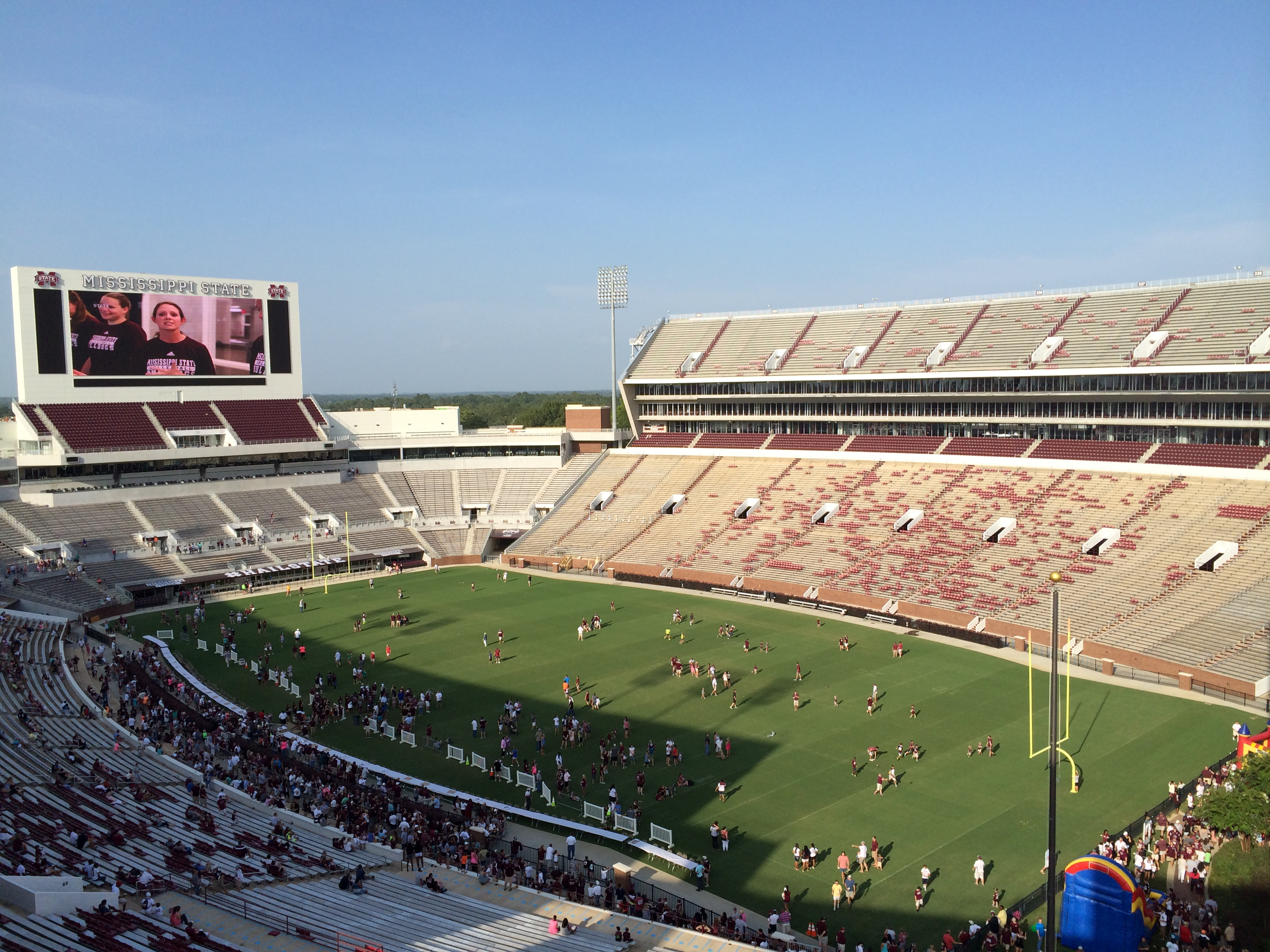
- The stadium as seen after its 2014 expansion

- Location in Mississippi Location in the United States
- Former names: New Athletic Field (1914–1920); Scott Field (1920–2000)
- Location: 90 BS Hood Drive, Mississippi State, MS 39762
- Coordinates: 33°27′23″N 88°47′37″W
- Owner: Mississippi State University
- Operator: Mississippi State University
- Capacity: 60,311 (2022–present) Former capacity: List: Unknown (1914–1927); c. 6,000 (1928–1935); 20,000 (1936–1947); 35,000 (1948–1982); 32,000 (1983–1985); 40,656 (1986–2000); 45,286 (2001); 52,884 (2002); 55,082 (2003–2013); 61,337 (2014–2021)
- Surface: Latitude 36 Bermudagrass
- Record attendance: 62,945 (October 11, 2014 vs Auburn)

Construction
- Opened: 1914
- Renovated: 1928, 1982, 2002, 2014
- Expanded: 1936, 1948, 1986, 2002, 2014
- Cost: Original Unknown $15,000 (1928 renovation) $7.2 million (1986 expansion) $21 million (2002 renovation) $75 million (2014 renovation)
- Architects: Original Unknown; W.P.A (1936 expansion); Warren, Knight, & Davis, Ltd. Architects (1986 expansion); Foil Wyatt Architects (2002 expansion); LPK Architects & 360 Architecture (2014 expansion/renovation)

Tenant
- Mississippi State Bulldogs football (NCAA) (1914–present)

Website
- hailstate.com/davis-wade-stadium

Davis Wade Stadium, officially known as Davis Wade Stadium at Scott Field is the home venue for the Mississippi State Bulldogs football team. Originally constructed in 1914 as New Athletic Field, it is the second-oldest stadium in the Football Bowl Subdivision behind Georgia Tech's Bobby Dodd Stadium, and the fourth oldest in all of college football behind Penn's Franklin Field, Harvard Stadium, and Bobby Dodd Stadium. As of 2022, it has a seating capacity of 60,311 people.

== History ==
The stadium was built in 1914, as a replacement for Hardy Field, and was called New Athletic Field. The first game it hosted was a Mississippi State win over Marion (Ala.) Military Institute, 54–0, on Oct. 3, 1914. In 1920 the student body adopted a resolution to name the field Scott Field in honor of Donald Scott, an Olympic middle-distance runner and one of the university's football stars from 1915 to 1916. Prior to the 2001 season the stadium was named Davis Wade Stadium in honor of longtime MSU supporter Floyd Davis Wade Sr., co-founder of Aflac, because of a large financial contribution he made toward stadium expansion. The playing surface retained the name Scott Field and the official name of the facility is "Davis Wade Stadium at Scott Field".

=== Renovations and expansions ===
In 1928 permanent seating for 3,000 was built on the west side—the lower level of the current facility's west grandstand. In addition, there were portable stands with a similar capacity bringing the seating total to around 6,000. In 1936, with the use of WPA labor, concrete stands seating 8,000 people were added to the west sidelines and steel bleachers were built on the east sideline and end zones. This brought the total capacity to 20,000. 1948 saw the stadium enlarged once again with the expansion of the west sideline structure and the addition of 12,000 concrete seats and stands in both end zones to bring the total capacity to 35,000. In 1983, the end zone seating was removed, reducing the capacity to 32,000. A 1986 expansion costing $7.2 million, raised without state budget appropriations, added almost 9,000 seats, consisting primarily of a 5,500-seat upper deck as well as permanent lighting and a computerized scoreboard which was replaced in 1997 with a Sony JumboTron. The Frank Turman Fieldhouse received an additional floor to its facility in 1990. Named Leo W. Seal M-Club Centre in honor of Leo W. Seal Sr., a 2-year letter winner at State, it is a meeting place for the letterman organization, the M-Club.

In 1999, the Turman Fieldhouse underwent numerous changes, including remodeled dressing rooms for both teams, and an all-new recruiting lounge, and the stadium began a $50 million expansion and renovation partially funded by Floyd Davis Wade Sr.. The expansion was completed in 2002 bringing the total capacity to 55,082, including 50 skyboxes, 1,700 club-level seats and a second upper deck seating 7,000.

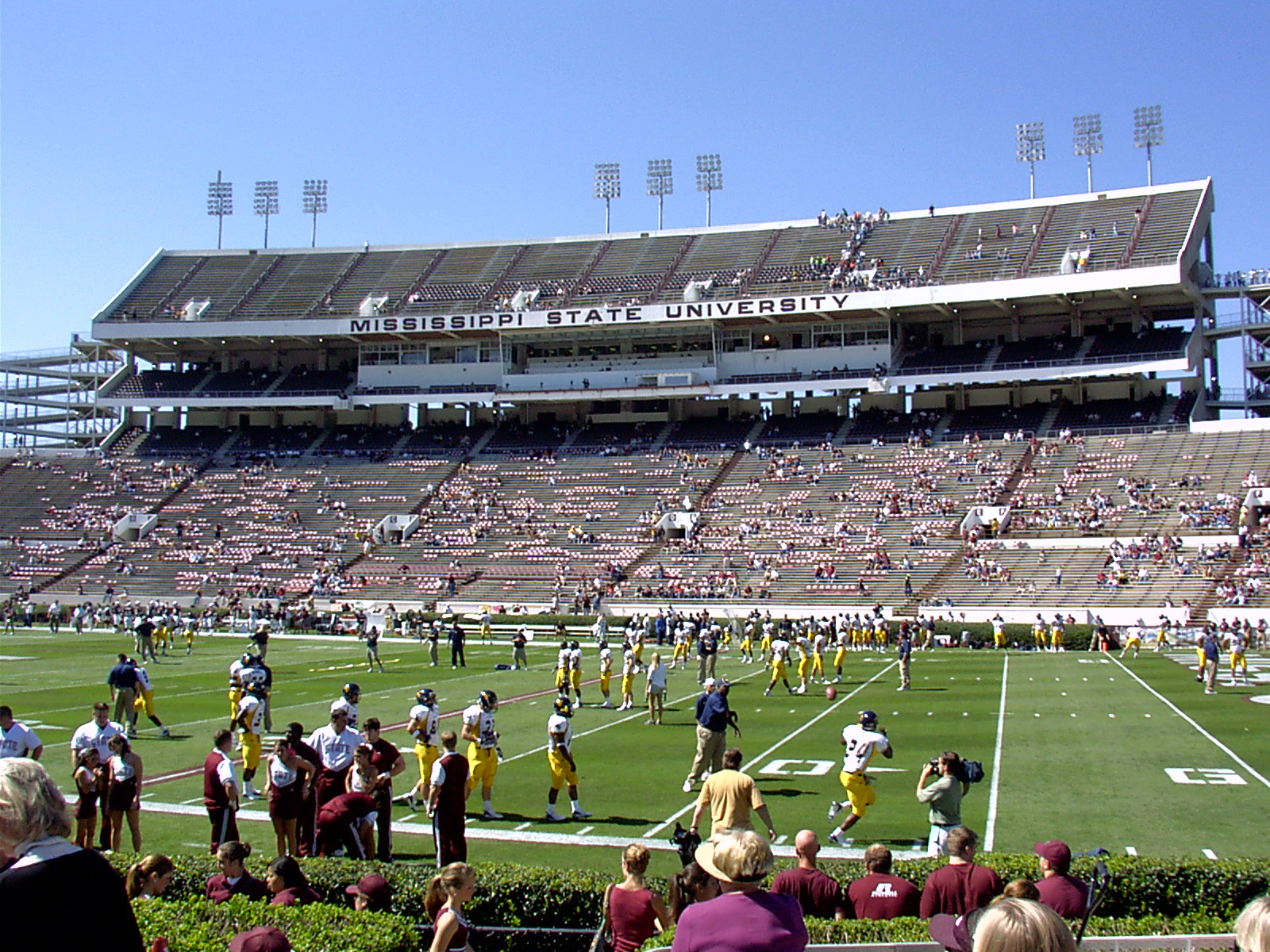
The stadium during a game in 2006

In the fall of 2008 construction was completed on an all-new $6.1 million 112 ft (34 m) wide by 48 ft (15 m) tall HD video display board in the south end zone above the Leo Seal M-Club Center. The LED video system is the tenth largest high-definition video board in college football. The new board was used for the first time on November 1, 2008, during the Mississippi State Bulldogs vs. Kentucky Wildcats football game. The main video display is complemented with two HD LED advertising boards on each side of the main board, as well as an HD LED "ribbon ticker" which spans the width of the structure below the main board. Therefore, the total video board square footage (on one structure) is 6,896 square feet (640.7 m^{2}). To complement the all-new video system, a new state-of-the-art sound system has been installed by Pro Sound, headquartered in Miami, Florida.

A $75 million expansion, completed in August 2014, increased the capacity of the stadium to 61,337, created new concessions and restrooms, and created a new west side concourse. Part of the expansion included sealing off the north end zone and installing a large HD video board, similar to the one in the south end zone which replaced the JumboTron that was installed there in 1997.

On June 22, 2022, MSU unveiled a renovation plan called "Balconies at Davis Wade Stadium". The new concept replaces seats on the west side of the upper deck with tiered open-air boxes. The idea behind the renovation is to provide fans with children and those hoping for a more social gameday experience to have the ability to walk around and socialize with fellow fans without having to leave the seating area. The balconies are each 9 feet, 6 inches deep with the exception of the top balconies which are 12 feet deep, and each balcony is equipped with a drink rail in the front. Fans will be able to come in the day before gameday to service their balcony by bringing supplies, chairs, fans, etc. in preparation for the game the following day. Sections 301, 302, 312, 313, along with parts of sections 303 and 311 will have their current bleacher seats removed and be replaced with the new boxes. The renovation is expected to reduce the total seating capacity of Davis Wade Stadium by almost 2,000 seats and is estimated to cost $2.5 million. Currently, the balconies are expected to be completed by mid-August and in operation by the first home game of the season against Memphis on September 3, 2022.

== Attendance records ==
Davis Wade Stadium attendance records
Rank	Attendance	Date	Game Result
1	62,945	10-11-2014	No. 3 Mississippi State 38, No. 2 Auburn 23
2	62,531	09-13-2015	No. 14 LSU 21, No. 25 Mississippi State 19
3	62,435	11-14-2015	No. 3 Alabama 31, No. 20 Mississippi State 6
4	62,307	11-01-2014	No. 1 Mississippi State 17, Arkansas 10
5	62,265	11-28-2015	No. 19 Ole Miss 38, No. 23 Mississippi State 27
6	61,889	08-30-2014	Mississippi State 49, Southern Miss 0
7	61,651	10-17-2015	Mississippi State 45, Louisiana Tech 20
8	61,574	09-19-2015	Mississippi State 62, Northwestern State 13
9	61,421	11-08-2014	No. 1 Mississippi State 45, Tennessee-Martin 16
10	61,406	09-29-2018	Florida 13, No. 23 Mississippi State 6

== Traditions ==
Davis Wade Stadium on the Mississippi State University campus

The Junction on a home football game day on the campus of Mississippi State University

- The Junction, located on the south side of the stadium, is a grassy park where Bulldog fans tailgate under tents during sports weekends. It is named The Junction for the railroad that ran through the tailgating area in the campus' past. It also replaced "Malfunction Junction", a set of adjacent intersections where 5 different streets converged on campus. The streets were rerouted around the area and a pedestrian park was built on the site. While many Bulldog fans tailgate in other places on campus, The Junction is unique in that it allows thousands of fans to tailgate under tents directly in front of the stadium without cars or traffic. The Junction has been referred to as the “premier tailgate experience” by the Birmingham-based firm contracted for its design and development.
- The "Dawg Walk" is held approximately 2 hours before each home game. This is where the team and coaches walk through The Junction to the stadium with the Famous Maroon Band performing and thousands of Bulldog fans lining the walk, cheering the players on.
- Beginning with the first game of the 2014 season Mississippi State started a new tradition when then head coach Dan Mullen asked the DJ at Davis Wade Stadium to play "Don't Stop Believin'" between the third and fourth quarters of each Bulldog home game. MSU fans took to the song and began to sway and ring their cowbells in sync with the beat while singing along and have done so at every home contest since.
- One of the Bulldogs' proudest and longest traditions is the ringing of cowbells. From 1977 to 2009, "artificial noisemakers" were banned by the SEC, including cowbells, but fans continued to bring them in even though administrators encouraged fans not to use cowbells and security guards "searched" them upon entry. There could be as many as 40,000 cowbells in the stadium during a big game. In the 2010 season, a compromise was reached on a trial basis allowing fans to legally bring cowbells under SEC rules to games at Davis Wade Stadium as long as the cowbells were only used at sanctioned times: Pregame, quarter breaks and halftime, timeouts, and when Mississippi State scores. Prior to the 2014 season the SEC adopted a new stadium sound policy that gave MSU fans even more leeway to use the cowbells. The new policy "allows schools to play music and use their sound systems at any time during a game, except from the time the center stands over the football to when the ensuing play is whistled dead. The new rule also includes traditional institutional noisemakers, including MSU fans' cowbells."

== Facts ==
- Between October 2009 and September 2014, Davis Wade Stadium hosted 31 consecutive sellouts. That stretch included 9 of the top 10 crowds to attend a game at the stadium. The streak ended with a contest against the University of Alabama at Birmingham (the crowd was one of the top 10 in stadium history but was not enough to keep the sellout streak alive in the newly expanded stadium).
- The original Bulldog mascot, Bully I, is buried on the 50 yard-line under the players bench.
- The high definition video board is currently the 4th largest video board in the SEC and the 10th largest on-campus video board in the nation.
- The entire concourse area underneath the East Upper Deck is sealed and climate-controlled.
- Davis Wade Stadium is one of the locations of the Egg Bowl, the annual rivalry match up between the Mississippi State Bulldogs and the Ole Miss Rebels of the University of Mississippi. The game alternates between Davis Wade Stadium and Vaught–Hemingway Stadium on the Ole Miss campus. The 100th game between the teams was played at Davis Wade Stadium. Because of the way the locations alternate from year to year, Mississippi State hosts on the odd-numbered years and Ole Miss hosts on the even-numbered years.
- The first Division I-A college football game played after the September 11 attacks was at Davis Wade Stadium between Mississippi State and the South Carolina Gamecocks on September 20, 2001, and broadcast on ESPN.
- Mississippi State is credited with being the first to use the song Who Let The Dogs Out? at a sporting event. MSU used the version recorded by Chuck Smooth rather than the Baha Men version. It was played before and during Mississippi State football games and was used for the Dawg Pound Rock once it was moved from the field to the sidelines. Although put on hiatus during Sylvester Croom's tenure as Mississippi State head coach, the Dawg Pound Rock and the song made a popular return in the 2009 season.
- In 2011 Bleacher Report called it one of college football's top 50 stadiums to see before you die.

== Gallery ==
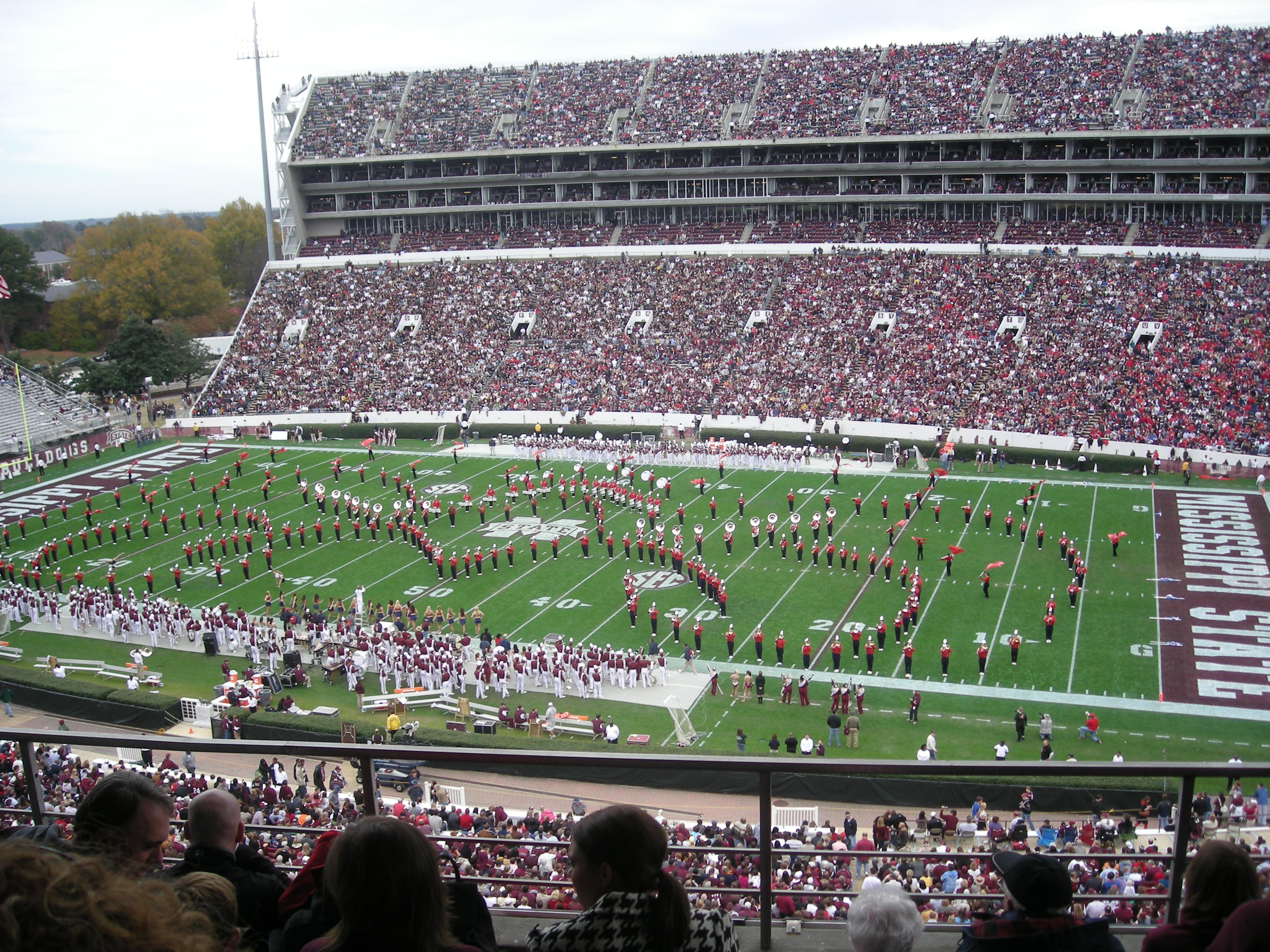
Halftime, Egg Bowl 2009

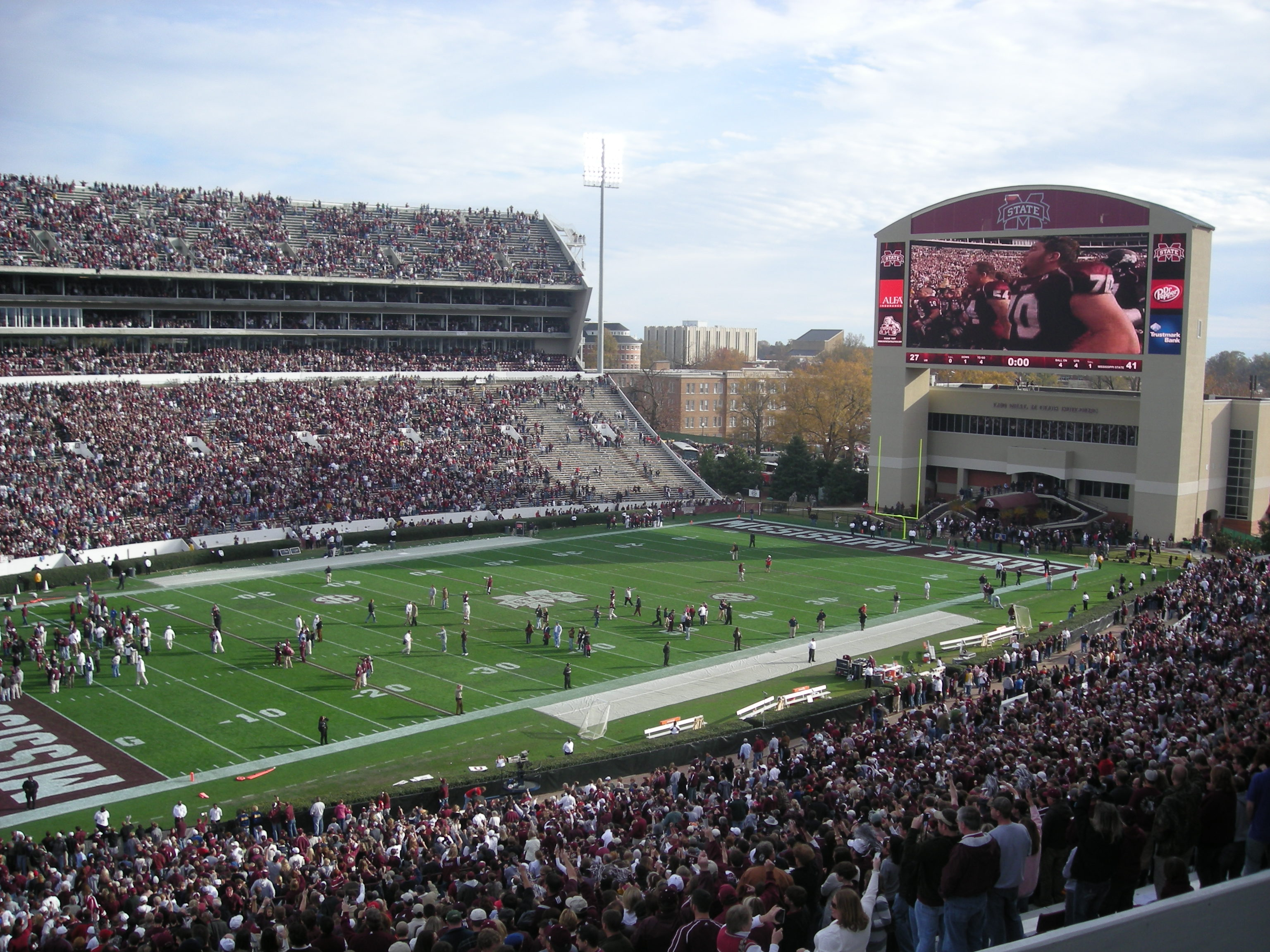
Egg Bowl 2009

== See also ==
- List of NCAA Division I FBS football stadiums
- List of American football stadiums by capacity
- Lists of stadiums
