= Laurent Miquelard =

French tennis player

- Country (sports): France
- Born: 1970 (age 54–55)

Doubles
- Career record: 0–1
- Highest ranking: No. 1130 (22 May 1995)

Grand Slam doubles results
- US Open: 1R (1994)

Laurent Miquelard (born 1970) is a French former tennis player.

Miquelard, a Paris native, was a collegiate tennis player for Mississippi State University in the early 1990s. He was one of several French players in the Mississippi State side during this time, including his doubles partner Daniel Courcol.

In 1994 he won the NCAA doubles championships with Joc Simmons, over USC's Wayne Black and Jon Leach. The pair then featured together in the doubles main draw of the 1994 US Open.
