= Newell–Grissom Building =

Indoor arena at the Mississippi State University

- The Barn
- Interactive map of Newell–Grissom Building
- Former names: Animal Husbandry Service Building
- Location: 100 Old Bully Blvd; Starkville, Mississippi
- Coordinates: 33.45455°N 88.79668°W
- Owner: Mississippi State University
- Operator: Mississippi State University
- Capacity: 2,000

Construction
- Opened: 1953
- Architect: James T. Canizaro

Tenant
- Mississippi State Bulldogs women's volleyball

The Newell–Grissom Building is 2,000 seat indoor arena on the Mississippi State University in Starkville, Mississippi. It has been the home of Mississippi State Bulldogs women's volleyball since 1997.

The building was designed primarily as a facility for rodeos, livestock shows and equestrian competitions. In 1978, the arena was formally named in honor of two longtime leaders in MSU’s animal science department, Paul F. Newell (1910) and E.E. Grissom (1932). It is also used for concerts and other university events.

Before the 1995 renovation, the building was used as a practice facility for the men's and women's basketball teams as well as the volleyball team. Before moving the Newell-Grissom, the volleyball team previously played at McCarthy Gymnasium and Humphrey Coliseum.

The building has been a Mississippi historic landmark since 2019.
