= 1963 Liberty Bowl =

American college football game

- 5th Liberty Bowl
Mississippi State Bulldogs	NC State Wolfpack
(6–2–2)	(8–2)
SEC	ACC
16	12
Head coach: Paul E. Davis	Head coach: Earle Edwards
AP / Coaches; NR / 11
	1	2	3	4	Total
Mississippi State	13	3	0	0	16
NC State	0	6	0	6	12
- Date: December 21, 1963
- Season: 1963
- Stadium: Philadelphia Municipal Stadium
- Location: Philadelphia, Pennsylvania
- MVP: Ode Burrell (HB, Mississippi State)
- Attendance: 8,309

The 1963 Liberty Bowl was a college football bowl game played at Philadelphia Stadium in Philadelphia, on December 21, 1963. The fifth edition of the Liberty Bowl was played between the Mississippi State Bulldogs and the North Carolina State Wolfpack before a crowd of 8,309 fans in brutally cold weather. Coach Paul E. Davis led Mississippi State to victory, but the significant dropoff in attendance from prior games led organizers to relocate the 1964 edition of the bowl to the Atlantic City Convention Hall (now known as Boardwalk Hall) in Atlantic City, New Jersey, as the first college bowl game ever played indoors.

== Teams ==
Led by head coach Paul E. Davis, Mississippi State came into the game with a 6–2–2 record, having lost to both Memphis and Alabama, while defeating bowl-bound teams from Auburn and LSU and tying Ole Miss. The Bulldogs were ranked 11th in the Coaches Poll, and were favored to win the game by the Associated Press. The NC State Wolfpack entered the game with a record of 8–2, under head coach Earle Edwards.

== Game summary ==
The game was played at 1:00 PM Eastern Standard Time and was broadcast by NBC. The two teams from the South played in bitter cold weather, with a temperature of 22 °F (−6 °C) at the kickoff, dropping to 15 °F (−9 °C) by the end of the game. There was also a very strong wind which amplified the effect of the low temperatures, making it nearly unbearable. 8,309 fans were in attendance, 8,000 fewer than the lowest previous attendance at a Liberty Bowl and a marked drop off from the 100,000 who attended the Army–Navy Game two weeks earlier in the 102,000-capacity stadium.

Mississippi State's Bill McGuire blocked a punt by North Carolina State's Dave Houtz, which was recovered by the Bulldogs' Tommy Inman at the 11-yard line and returned for a touchdown to give Mississippi State a 7-0 lead six minutes into the first quarter. NC State was forced to punt on their next possession from their own 15-yard line, with Mississippi State taking over on the NC State 47-yard-line. On the eighth play of the drive, quarterback Sonny Fisher scored on a wide left-end roll out from the 3-yard-line to give the Bulldogs a 13–0 lead after the extra point attempt failed. Mississippi State took possession on the NC State 49-yard-line after another short punt and Justin Canale kicked a 43-yard field goal at the start of the second quarter that just cleared the crossbar, giving the Bulldogs a 16–0 lead, and the last points the team would score in the game. North Carolina State scored on a quarterback sneak by Jim Rossi in the second period, but with the two-point conversion failing, the Wolfpack trailed 13–6 at halftime. In the fourth quarter, the final score of the game came on a four-yard pass from Rossi to Ray Barlow; The score was 16–12 after the two-point conversion failed again. NC State attempted an onside kick which went to the Bulldogs after the Wolfpack was called for touching the ball before it had traveled ten yards, and Mississippi State was able to hold on to the margin of victory.

The Bulldogs' Hoyle Granger, who later played professionally for the Houston Oilers, led all players with 94 yards rushing. Ode Burrell of Mississippi State, who was drafted by the Green Bay Packers but also played for the Oilers in the American Football League, rushed for 69 yards and was voted the game's most valuable player. The Wolfpack's Rossi was 5 for 12 on passing and gained 67 yards on the ground, earning recognition as the game's outstanding back.

== Aftermath ==
The Liberty Bowl was played for its initial five editions outdoors in Philadelphia Stadium, often in temperatures below freezing. The inaugural Liberty Bowl in 1959 saw Penn State beat Alabama by a score of 7–0 in front of 38,000 fans. But it was downhill from there, and fewer than 10,000 were in attendance to watch the 1963 edition, with the organizers taking a loss of $40,000. The frigid temperatures at year-end in the Northeast led to the game being called the "Deep Freeze Bowl". Bud Dudley, organizer of the Liberty Bowl, was ready for a change and he was receptive to an offer from a group of Atlantic City businessmen who were trying to help revive the fading Jersey Shore resort that included a $25,000 guarantee.

The 1964 edition, between West Virginia and Utah, was the first major bowl game ever played indoors, with a comfortable temperature of 60 °F (16 °C). The 1964 Liberty Bowl would be the last edition played in the Northeastern United States, as the bowl was moved to Memphis, Tennessee, for the 1965 edition, and has remained there since.
