= 2022 Mississippi State Bulldogs football team =

American college football season

2022 Mississippi State Bulldogs football

ReliaQuest Bowl champion

ReliaQuest Bowl, W 19–10 vs. Illinois
- Conference: Southeastern Conference
- Western Division

Ranking
- Coaches: No. 19
- AP: No. 20
- Record: 9–4 (4–4 SEC)
- Head coach: Mike Leach (3rd season; regular season); Zach Arnett (bowl game)
- Offensive scheme: Air Raid
- Defensive coordinator: Zach Arnett (3rd season)
- Base defense: 3–3–5
- Home stadium: Davis Wade Stadium

2022 Southeastern Conference football standings
	Conf.			Overall
Team	W		L	W		L
Eastern Division
No. 1 Georgia xy$#^	8	–	0	15	–	0
No. 6 Tennessee	6	–	2	11	–	2
No. 23 South Carolina	4	–	4	8	–	5
Kentucky	3	–	5	7	–	6
Florida	3	–	5	6	–	7
Missouri	3	–	5	6	–	7
Vanderbilt	2	–	6	5	–	7
Western Division
No. 16 LSU xy	6	–	2	10	–	4
No. 5 Alabama x	6	–	2	11	–	2
No. 20 Mississippi State	4	–	4	9	–	4
Ole Miss	4	–	4	8	–	5
Arkansas	3	–	5	7	–	6
Auburn	2	–	6	5	–	7
Texas A&M	2	–	6	5	–	7
Championship: Georgia 50, LSU 30
# – College Football Playoff champion; ^ – College Football Playoff participant; $ – Conference champion; x – Division champion/co-champions; y – Championship game participant; Rankings from AP Poll

The 2022 Mississippi State Bulldogs football team represented Mississippi State University in the 2022 NCAA Division I FBS football season. The Bulldogs played their home games at Davis Wade Stadium in Starkville, Mississippi, and compete in the Western Division of the Southeastern Conference (SEC). They were led by third-year head coach Mike Leach through the regular season, with Zach Arnett taking over for the team’s bowl appearance after Leach's death in December 2022.

In October 2022, 19-year-old freshman offensive lineman Samuel Westmoreland, from Tupelo, Mississippi, died by suicide. Mississippi State honored Westmoreland with helmet stickers and by painting his initials and number on Scott Field.

On December 11, Leach was hospitalized in critical condition, and Arnett was elevated to interim head coach. Practice for the Bulldogs ahead of the 2023 ReliaQuest Bowl and recruiting, was scheduled to continue as normal. Leach died in the evening of December 12, with Mississippi State announcing the news in a statement the following morning. Following the death of Leach, Arnett was made the permanent head coach.

== Schedule ==
Mississippi State and the SEC announced the 2022 football schedule on September 21, 2021.

Date	Time	Opponent	Rank	Site	TV	Result	Attendance
September 3	6:30 p.m.	Memphis*		Davis Wade Stadium; Starkville, MS	ESPNU	W 49–23	54,360
September 10	10:00 p.m.	at Arizona*		Arizona Stadium; Tucson, AZ	FS1	W 39–17	46,275
September 17	5:00 p.m.	at LSU		Tiger Stadium; Baton Rouge, LA (rivalry)	ESPN	L 16–31	98,520
September 24	11:00 a.m.	Bowling Green*		Davis Wade Stadium; Starkville, MS	SECN	W 45–14	48,376
October 1	3:00 p.m.	No. 17 Texas A&M		Davis Wade Stadium; Starkville, MS	SECN	W 42–24	51,930
October 8	11:00 a.m.	Arkansas^{†}	No. 23	Davis Wade Stadium; Starkville, MS (SEC Nation)	SECN	W 40–17	57,849
October 15	6:30 p.m.	at No. 22 Kentucky	No. 16	Kroger Field; Lexington, KY	SECN	L 17–27	61,451
October 22	6:00 p.m.	at No. 6 Alabama	No. 24	Bryant–Denny Stadium; Tuscaloosa, AL (rivalry)	ESPN	L 6–30	100,077
November 5	6:30 p.m.	Auburn		Davis Wade Stadium; Starkville, MS	ESPN2	W 39–33 ^{OT}	57,769
November 12	6:00 p.m.	No. 1 Georgia		Davis Wade Stadium; Starkville, MS	ESPN	L 19–45	60,352
November 19	11:00 a.m.	East Tennessee State*		Davis Wade Stadium; Starkville, MS	ESPN+/SECN+	W 56–7	49,117
November 24	6:00 p.m.	at No. 20 Ole Miss		Vaught–Hemingway Stadium; Oxford, MS (Egg Bowl)	ESPN	W 24–22	62,487
January 2, 2023	11:00 a.m.	vs. Illinois*	No. 22	Raymond James Stadium; Tampa, FL (ReliaQuest Bowl)	ESPN2	W 19–10	35,797
*Non-conference game; ^{†}Homecoming; Rankings from AP Poll (and CFP Rankings, after November 1) - Released prior to game; All times are in Central time

== Rankings ==
Ranking movements Legend: ██ Increase in ranking ██ Decrease in ranking — = Not ranked RV = Received votes
	Week															
Poll	Pre	1	2	3	4	5	6	7	8	9	10	11	12	13	14	Final
AP	RV	RV	RV	—	—	23	16	24	RV	RV	RV	—	RV	25	24	20
Coaches	RV	RV	RV	RV	RV	23	17	24	RV	RV	RV	—	RV	25	23	19
CFP	Not released									—	—	—	—	24	22	Not released

== Roster ==
2022 Mississippi State Bulldogs football team roster
Players
Coaches
Offense

Pos.	#	Name	Class
WR	0	Rara Thomas	So
QB	2	Will Rogers	Jr
QB	3	Daniel Greek	RFr
WR	4	Caleb Ducking	RSr
WR	5	Lideatrick Griffin	Jr
WR	6	Jamire Calvin	GS
RB	7	Jo'Quavious Marks	Jr
WR	8	Jordan Mosley	RFr
QB	9	Chance Lovertich	GS
WR	11	Jaden Walley	Jr
QB	12	Sawyer Robertson	RFr
QB	15	Jake Weir	RFr
QB	16	Braedyn Locke	Fr
WR	18	Justin Robinson	RSo
RB	21	Ke'Travion Hargrove	RFr
RB	22	Simeon Price	RFr
RB	23	Dillon Johnson	Jr
WR	24	Scoobie Ford	RSr
RB	28	Brinston Williams	Fr
WR	29	Kaydin Pope	Fr
RB	32	J.J. Jernighan	GS
RB	34	Kione Roberson	Fr
RB	35	Javaris Bufford	RFr
RB	38	Ashtanyrein Duncan	RSo
OL	51	Reed Buys	RJr
OL	52	Grant Jackson	RSo
OL	54	Jackson Cannon	Fr
OL	56	Wesley Davis	Fr
OL	57	Cole Smith	RSr
OL	58	Kameron Jones	RSr
OL	63	LaQuinston Sharp	GS
OL	64	Steven Losoya III	RJr
OL	65	JT Zakkak	RSo
OL	66	Nick Jones	RJr
OL	68	Gabe Cavazos Jr.	RFr
OL	69	Kwatrivous Johnson	RSr
OL	70	Hastings Carruth	Fr
OL	71	Jim Riley	RFr
OL	72	Canon Boone	RFr
OL	75	Percy Lewis	Jr
OL	76	Albert Reese IV	RFr
OL	77	Lucas Taylor	Fr
OL	78	Sam Westmoreland	Fr
OL	79	Jakson LaHue	Fr
WR	80	Kade Kolka	RJr
WR	81	Antonio Harmon	RFr
WR	82	Rufus Harvey	RSo
WR	83	Marquez Dortch	Fr
WR	84	Jarnorris Hopson	Fr
WR	85	Austin Williams	GS
WR	86	Braden Coffey	Fr
WR	87	Zavion Thomas	Fr
WR	88	Nick Lauderdale	Sr
WR	89	Andrew Berquist	RFr

Defense

Pos.	#	Name	Class
S	0	Jalen Green	GS
CB	1	Marcus Banks	Sr
LB	2	Tyrus Wheat	GS
CB	3	Decamerion Richardson	Jr
CB	4	DeCarlos Nicholson	Jr
DE	5	Randy Charlton	GS
DE	6	Jordan Davis	GS
S	8	Jackie Matthews	GS
DE	9	De'Monte Russell	RJr
S	10	Corey Ellington	So
S	12	Shawn Preston Jr.	RSr
CB	13	Emmanuel Forbes	Jr
LB	14	Nathaniel Watson	RSr
DE	15	Jack Harris	RJr
LB	16	DeShawn Page	RJr
S	17	Jordan Morant	RSo
S	19	Collin Duncan	Sr
CB	20	Alexander Shaw	Sr
S	21	Hunter Washington	RFr
DT	22	Nathan Pickering	Sr
DL	23	Trevion Williams	Fr
S	24	Dylan Lawrence	RJr
S	25	Wesley Miller	Fr
LB	26	JP Purvis	RJr
CB	27	Esaias Furdge	GS
S	28	Tanner Johnson	Fr
CB	30	Nicholas Bargains	Fr
LB	31	Javae Gilmore	Fr
CB	32	Audavion Collins	Fr
S	33	Trent Singleton	Fr
LB	34	Sherman Timbs	GS
DL	35	Kalvin Dinkins	Fr
DL	36	Donterry Russell	Fr
LB	37	John Lewis	RFr
LB	39	Avery Sledge	Fr
LB	40	Nic Mitchell	RFr
S	41	Cody Swanson	RJr
LB	44	Jett Johnson	GS
LB	45	Ty Cooper	So
CB	46	William Hardrick	RFr
DL	50	Matai Mata'afa	RFr
LB	52	Khalid Moore	Fr
LB	55	Michael Robinson	RFr
DL	73	Max Ryan	RFr
DE	91	Deonte Anderson	RFr
DE	92	Jevon Banks	RSo
DT	93	Cameron Young	RSr
DT	94	Jaden Crumedy	GS
DL	96	Gavin Nelson	Fr
DL	99	Jacarius Clayton	Fr

Special teams

Pos.	#	Name	Class
K	29	Massimo Biscardi	GS
LS	41	Manny Hillman	Jr
LS	43	Hayes Hammond	RSo
K	49	Marlon Hauck	Fr
LS	55	Rex Robich	RFr
P	56	Archer Trafford	RSr
P	88	George Georgopoulos	GS
K	89	Ben Raybon	GS
K	90	Hudson Hollenbeck	Fr
K	98	Jordan Kennedy	Fr

Head coach

- Mike Leach

Coordinators/assistant coaches

- Tony Hughes – Associate Football Head Coach (Nickelbacks)
- Zach Arnett – Assistant Football Coach (Defensive Coordinator/Safeties)
- Matt Brock – Assistant Football Coach (Linebackers)
- Drew Hollingshead – Assistant Football Coach (Inside Receivers)
- Darcel McBath – Assistant Football Coach (Cornerbacks)
- Eric Mele – Assistant Football Coach (Special Teams Coordinator)
- Mason Miller – Assistant Football Coach (Offensive Line/Run Game Coordinator)
- Jeff Phelps – Assistant Football Coach (Defensive Line)
- Steve Spurrier Jr. – Assistant Football Coach (Outside Receivers/Pass Game Coordinator)
- Jason Washington – Assistant Football Coach (Running Backs)
- Brett Dewhurst – Senior Defensive Analyst
- Carson Cramer – Offensive Quality Control
- Adam Shaker – Offensive Quality Control
- Trey Tinsley – Offensive Quality Control
- Shane Gallant – Special Teams Quality Control
- Brittany Thackery – Associate A.D./Football Administration
- David Wilczewski – Associate A.D./Football Operations
- Juliana Prezelski – Assistant Director/Football Operations
- Matt Dudek – Associate A.D./Football Player Personnel
- Jay Hopson – Director of High School Relations
- Rod Gibson – Director of Football Recruiting Communications
- Andrea Hollis – Director of On-Campus Recruiting
- Carly Greer – Coordinator of Recruiting Operations
- Kyle Schexnayder – Football Recruiting Specialist
- Seth Swinney – Graphic Designer
- Chris Zuccaro – Director of Football Technology
- Taylor Hart – Assistant Director of Football Technology
- Alex Hunt – Football Video Fellow
- Tyson Brown – Head Strength & Conditioning Coach
- Dan Kistler Jr. – Assistant Strength & Conditioning Coach
- Chad Traver – Assistant Strength & Conditioning Coach

Legend

- (C) Team captain
- (S) Suspended
- (I) Ineligible
- Injured
- Redshirt

Roster

== Players drafted into the NFL ==
Round	Pick	Player	Position	NFL club
1	16	Emmanuel Forbes	CB	Washington Commanders
4	123	Cameron Young	DT	Seattle Seahawks
