= 2024 Seattle Seahawks season =

American football team season

- Owner: Estate of Paul Allen
- General manager: John Schneider
- Head coach: Mike Macdonald
- Home stadium: Lumen Field

Results
- Record: 10–7
- Division place: 2nd NFC West
- Playoffs: Did not qualify
- Pro Bowlers: CB Devon Witherspoon; DT Leonard Williams; WR Jaxon Smith-Njigba

Uniform
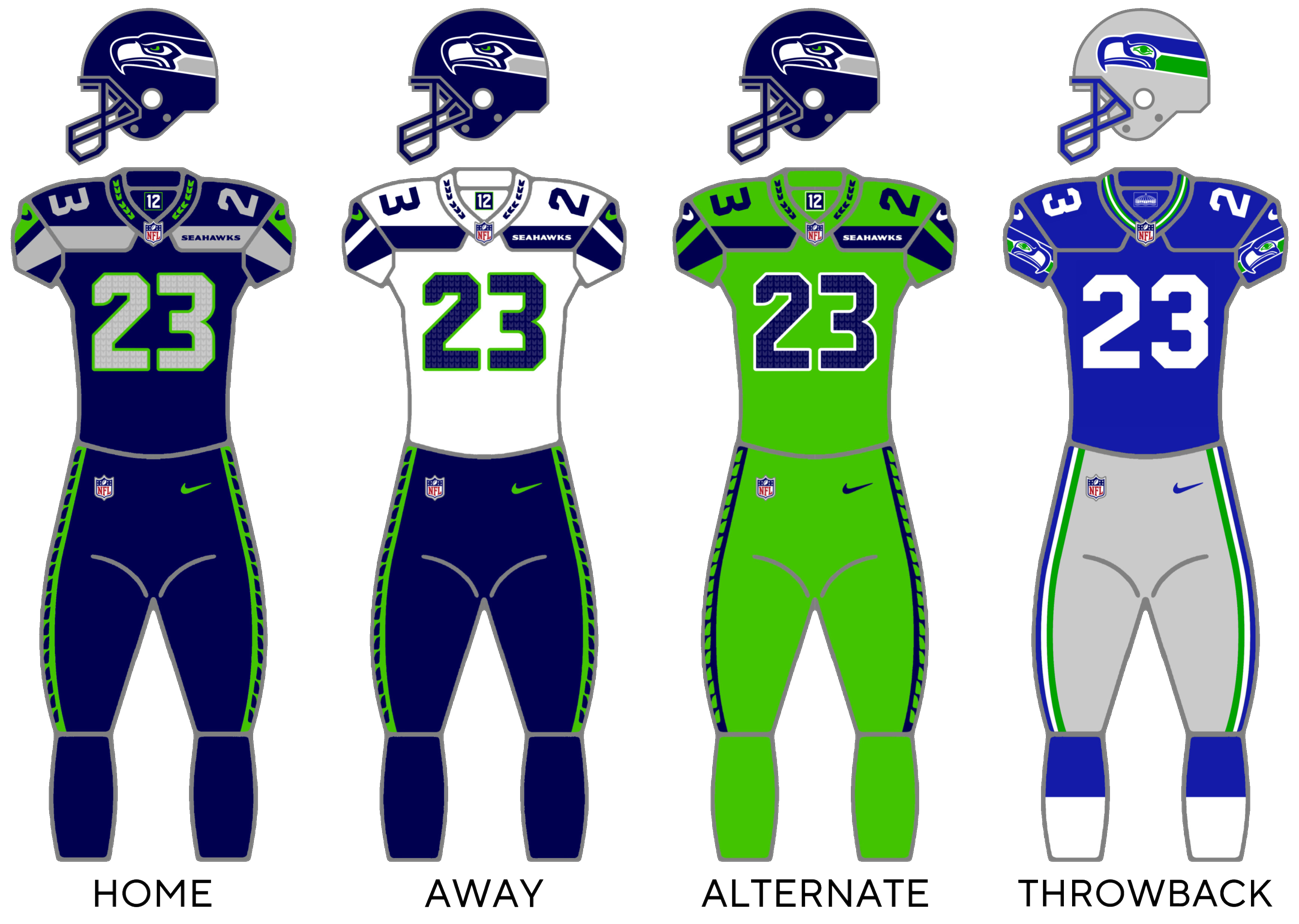

The 2024 season was the Seattle Seahawks' 49th in the National Football League (NFL), their 15th under general manager John Schneider and their first under head coach Mike Macdonald. The team improved their win records from the previous two seasons; however, the Seahawks missed the playoffs in consecutive seasons for the first time since 2008–2009. The Seahawks finished tied with the Los Angeles Rams for the NFC West division title, but the Rams won the division based on the strength of victory tiebreaker. This was also the second straight season the Seahawks missed a playoff spot by the strength of victory tiebreaker. They were the first team since the 2020 Miami Dolphins to miss the playoffs despite having double-digit wins, and the first to do so since the NFL expanded to 17 games. This was their first season since 2009 without Pete Carroll as head coach of the team, as he and the Seahawks mutually agreed to part ways three days after the end of the 2023 season.

Despite a strong 8-5 start, they suffered back-to-back critical losses against the Green Bay Packers and Minnesota Vikings which significantly decreased their playoff hopes in the season.

The Seahawks notably struggled at home during the season, going 3–6, their worst home record since 2008. Conversely, they went 7–1 on the road, which included sweeping their road division games.

This would be the last season with wide receivers Tyler Lockett and DK Metcalf, and quarterback Geno Smith on the roster. Lockett was released after the season on March 5, 2025, ending his ten-year stint with the team, while Smith and Metcalf would be traded eight days later to the Raiders and Steelers, respectively.

== Draft ==
2024 Seattle Seahawks draft selections
Round	Selection	Player	Position	College	Notes
1	16	Byron Murphy II	DT	Texas	
2	47	Traded to the New York Giants (Note: The Seahawks traded a second-round selection (47th overall) and a 2025 fifth-round selection to the New York Giants in exchange for DL Leonard Williams.)			
3	78	Traded to the Washington Commanders (Note: The Seahawks traded third- and fifth-round selections (78th and 152nd overall) to Washington in exchange for fourth- and sixth-round selections (102nd and 179th overall), and QB Sam Howell.)			
3	81	Christian Haynes	G	UConn	From Saints via Broncos (Note: The Seahawks traded a 2023 third-round selection (83rd overall) to the Denver Broncos in exchange for a third-round selection (81st overall) and a 2023 fourth-round selection (108th overall).)
4	102	Traded to the Denver Broncos (Note: The Seahawks traded fourth- and seventh-round selections (102nd and 235th overall) to the Denver Broncos in exchange for fourth-, fifth- and sixth-round selections (121st, 136th and 207th overall).)			From Commanders
4	118	Tyrice Knight	LB	UTEP	
4	121	AJ Barner	TE	Michigan	From Dolphins via Broncos
5	136	Nehemiah Pritchett	CB	Auburn	From Panthers via Browns and Broncos
5	152	Traded to the Washington Commanders			
6	179	Sataoa Laumea	G	Utah	From Commanders
6	192	D. J. James	CB	Auburn	
6	207	Michael Jerrell	OT	Findlay	From Broncos
7	235	Traded to the Denver Broncos			

2024 Seattle Seahawks undrafted free agents
Name	Position	College	Ref.
Sunny Anderson	LB	Grambling State	
Nelson Ceaser	LB	Houston	
Chevan Cordeiro	QB	San José State	
Easton Gibbs	LB	Wyoming	
Garret Greenfield	OT	South Dakota State	
Hayden Hatten	WR	Idaho	
George Holani	RB	Boise State	
Carlton Johnson	CB	Fresno State	
DeVere Levelston	DE	SMU	
Kobe Lewis	RB	Florida Atlantic	
Mike Novitsky	C	Kansas	
Ro Torrence	CB	Arizona State	
Jack Westover	TE	Washington	
Dee Williams	WR	Tennessee	
Rason Williams II	LB	Louisiana Tech	
TaMerik Williams	RB	North Dakota State	
Buddha Jones	NT	Troy	
Nathan Pickering	DE	Mississippi State	
Devin Richardson	LB	Washington State	
Jalen Sundell	OT	North Dakota State	
Jamie Sheriff	OLB	South Alabama	

Draft trades

== Personnel ==
=== Staff ===
2024 Seattle Seahawks staff
Front office: Owning entity – Paul Allen estate; Chairwoman/trustee – Jody Allen; Vice chairman – Bert Kolde; President – Chuck Arnold; President of football operations/general manager – John Schneider; Assistant general manager – Nolan Teasley; Vice president of football administration – Joey Laine; Vice president of player personnel – Trent Kirchner; Senior Director of player personnel – Matt Berry; Director of college scouting – Aaron Hineline; Director of pro personnel – Willie Schneider; Assistant director of college scouting – Jason Barnes; Assistant director of pro personnel – Armani Perez; Head coaches: Head coach – Mike Macdonald; Assistant head coach – Leslie Frazier; Offensive coaches: Offensive coordinator – Ryan Grubb; Passing game coordinator – Jake Peetz; Quarterbacks – Charles London; Running backs – Kennedy Polamalu; Wide receivers – Frisman Jackson; Assistant wide receivers – Tyson Prince; Tight ends – Mack Brown; Offensive line – Scott Huff; Assistant offensive line – Brendan Nugent; Offensive assistant/quality control-offensive line – Quinshon Odom; Offensive assistant/quality control – Zak Hill	Defensive coaches: Defensive coordinator – Aden Durde; Defensive line – Justin Hinds; Outside linebackers – Chris Partridge; Inside linebackers – Kirk Olivadotti; Passing game coordinator/defensive backs – Karl Scott; Safeties – Jeff Howard; Defensive assistant/linebackers – Josh Bynes; Defensive quality control – Nick Perry; Defensive intern – Rob Caprice; Special teams coaches: Special teams coordinator – Jay Harbaugh; Assistant special teams – Devin Fitzsimmons; Strength and conditioning: Head strength and conditioning – Ivan Lewis; Assistant strength and conditioning – Thomas Garcia; Assistant strength and conditioning – Mark Philipp; Assistant strength and conditioning – Grant Steen; Assistant strength and conditioning – Danny Van Dijk; Assistant strength and conditioning – Jamie Yanchar

=== Final roster ===
2024 Seattle Seahawks roster
Quarterbacks (QB): 15 Jaren Hall; 6 Sam Howell; 17 John Rhys Plumlee; 7 Geno Smith; Running backs (RB): 26 Zach Charbonnet; 36 George Holani; 25 Kenny McIntosh; Wide receivers (WR): 19 Jake Bobo; 1 Jaelon Darden; 16 Tyler Lockett; 14 DK Metcalf; 11 Jaxon Smith-Njigba; 82 Cody White; 83 Dareke Young; Tight ends (TE): 88 AJ Barner; 86 Pharaoh Brown; 87 Noah Fant	Offensive linemen (OL): 67 Charles Cross LT; 78 Stone Forsythe RT; 64 Christian Haynes RG; 65 Michael Jerrell RT; 63 Sataoa Laumea LG; 51 Olu Oluwatimi C; 61 Jalen Sundell C; 70 Laken Tomlinson LG; Defensive linemen (DL): 97 Johnathan Hankins DT; 55 Dre'Mont Jones DE; 94 Mike Morris DE; 91 Byron Murphy II DT; 76 Brandon Pili NT; 90 Jarran Reed NT; 98 Roy Robertson-Harris DT; 99 Leonard Williams DE	Linebackers (LB): 58 Derick Hall OLB; 13 Ernest Jones ILB; 48 Tyrice Knight ILB; 53 Boye Mafe OLB; 10 Uchenna Nwosu OLB; 52 Patrick O'Connell ILB; 18 Josh Ross LB; 42 Drake Thomas ILB; Defensive backs (DB): 22 Tre Brown CB; 8 Coby Bryant FS; 23 Artie Burns CB; 30 A. J. Finley SS; 2 Rayshawn Jenkins SS; 20 Julian Love FS; 28 Nehemiah Pritchett CB; 21 Devon Witherspoon CB; 27 Riq Woolen CB; Special teams (ST): 4 Michael Dickson P; 5 Jason Myers K; 41 Chris Stoll LS	Practice squad: 92 Quinton Bohanna DT; 81 Miles Boykin WR; 34 Brittain Brown RB; 35 Bump Cooper Jr. CB; 66 McClendon Curtis RT; 46 Michael Dowell LB; 33 Tyler Hall CB; 85 Tyler Mabry TE; 60 Mike Novitsky C; 77 Kenneth Odumegwu OLB (IPP); 39 Ty Okada FS; 73 Jason Peters LT (PS/I); 0 Cornell Powell WR; 44 Jamie Sheriff OLB (PS/I); 59 Tyreke Smith OLB; 37 Damarion Williams CB; Reserve: 75 Anthony Bradford RG (IR); 74 George Fant RT (IR); 50 Trevis Gipson OLB (IR); 29 Josh Jobe CB (IR); 72 Abraham Lucas RT (IR); 49 Joshua Onujiogu OLB (IR); 32 Jerrick Reed II FS (IR); 38 Brady Russell TE (IR); 9 Kenneth Walker III RB (IR); 24 K'Von Wallace SS (IR); 93 Cameron Young NT (IR); Rookies in italics 53 active, 11 reserve, 13 practice squad (3 exempt)

== Preseason ==
Week	Date	Opponent	Result	Record	Venue	Recap
1	August 10	at Los Angeles Chargers	W 16–3	1–0	SoFi Stadium	Recap
2	August 17	at Tennessee Titans	L 15–16	1–1	Nissan Stadium	Recap
3	August 24	Cleveland Browns	W 37–33	2–1	Lumen Field	Recap

== Regular season ==
=== Schedule ===
In addition to their home and away matchups against each of their NFC West division rivals, the Seahawks played against the teams from the NFC North and the AFC East. They also played against the teams that finished in third place in the NFC East, NFC South and AFC West.

Week	Date	Opponent	Result	Record	Venue	Recap
1	September 8	Denver Broncos	**W** 26–20	1–0	Lumen Field	Recap
2	September 15	at New England Patriots	**W** 23–20 (OT)	2–0	Gillette Stadium	Recap
3	September 22	Miami Dolphins	**W** 24–3	3–0	Lumen Field	Recap
4	September 30	at Detroit Lions	**L** 29–42	3–1	Ford Field	Recap
5	October 6	New York Giants	**L** 20–29	3–2	Lumen Field	Recap
6	October 10	**San Francisco 49ers**	**L** 24–36	3–3	Lumen Field	Recap
7	October 20	at Atlanta Falcons	**W** 34–14	4–3	Mercedes-Benz Stadium	Recap
8	October 27	Buffalo Bills	**L** 10–31	4–4	Lumen Field	Recap
9	November 3	**Los Angeles Rams**	**L** 20–26 (OT)	4–5	Lumen Field	Recap
10	Bye					
11	November 17	at **San Francisco 49ers**	**W** 20–17	5–5	Levi's Stadium	Recap
12	November 24	**Arizona Cardinals**	**W** 16–6	6–5	Lumen Field	Recap
13	December 1	at New York Jets	**W** 26–21	7–5	MetLife Stadium	Recap
14	December 8	at **Arizona Cardinals**	**W** 30–18	8–5	State Farm Stadium	Recap
15	December 15	Green Bay Packers	**L** 13–30	8–6	Lumen Field	Recap
16	December 22	Minnesota Vikings	**L** 24–27	8–7	Lumen Field	Recap
17	December 26	at Chicago Bears	**W** 6–3	9–7	Soldier Field	Recap
18	January 5	at **Los Angeles Rams**	**W** 30–25	10–7	SoFi Stadium	Recap

Note: Intra-division opponents are in bold text.

=== Game summaries ===
==== Week 1: vs. Denver Broncos ====
Week 1: Denver Broncos at Seattle Seahawks – Game summary

Quarter	1	2	3	4	Total
Broncos	3	10	0	7	**20**
**Seahawks**	3	6	10	7	**26**

at Lumen Field, Seattle, Washington

- Date: September 8
- Game time: 1:05 p.m. PDT
- Game weather: Mostly cloudy, 73 °F (23 °C)
- Game attendance: 68,714
- Referee: Brad Allen
- TV announcers (CBS): Spero Dedes, Adam Archuleta and Aditi Kinkhabwala
- Recap, Game Book

Game information

**First quarter**

- DEN – Wil Lutz 35-yard field goal, 12:36. Broncos 3–0. **Drive: 4 plays, 3 yards, 1:36.**
- SEA – Jason Myers 50-yard field goal, 2:41. Tied 3–3. **Drive: 7 plays, 46 yards, 2:57.**

**Second quarter**

- DEN – Penalty on Anthony Bradford enforced in the end zone for a safety, 11:22. Broncos 5–3.
- DEN – Wil Lutz 30-yard field goal, 8:45. Broncos 8–3. **Drive: 4 plays, −2 yards, 1:30.**
- SEA – Geno Smith 34-yard run (pass failed), 5:55. Seahawks 9–8. **Drive: 5 plays, 70 yards, 2:50.**
- DEN – Zach Charbonnet tackled in the end zone by Zach Allen and Jonathon Cooper for a safety, 4:24. Broncos 10–9.
- DEN – Wil Lutz 45-yard field goal, 0:02. Broncos 13–9. **Drive: 5 plays, 26 yards, 0:29.**

**Third quarter**

- SEA – Kenneth Walker III 23-yard run (Jason Myers kick), 10:44. Seahawks 16–13. **Drive: 6 plays, 61 yards, 2:47.**
- SEA – Jason Myers 28-yard field goal, 4:09. Seahawks 19–13. **Drive: 10 plays, 37 yards, 3:54.**

**Fourth quarter**

- SEA – Zach Charbonnet 30-yard pass from Geno Smith (Jason Myers kick), 14:54. Seahawks 26–13. **Drive: 6 plays, 80 yards, 2:43.**
- DEN – Bo Nix 4-yard run (Wil Lutz kick), 2:09. Seahawks 26–20. **Drive: 7 plays, 54 yards, 2:19.**

**Top passers**

- DEN – Bo Nix – 26/42, 138 yards, 2 INT
- SEA – Geno Smith – 18/25, 171 yards, TD, INT

**Top rushers**

- DEN – Bo Nix – 5 rushes, 35 yards, TD
- SEA – Kenneth Walker III – 20 rushes, 103 yards, TD

**Top receivers**

- DEN – Josh Reynolds – 5 receptions, 45 yards
- SEA – Tyler Lockett – 6 receptions, 77 yards

==== Week 2: at New England Patriots ====
Week 2: Seattle Seahawks at New England Patriots – Game summary

Quarter	1	2	3	4	OT	Total
**Seahawks**	7	10	0	3	3	**23**
Patriots	7	6	0	7	0	**20**

at Gillette Stadium, Foxborough, Massachusetts

- Date: September 15
- Game time: 1:00 p.m. EDT/10:00 a.m. PDT
- Game weather: Sunny, 77 °F (25 °C)
- Game attendance: 64,686
- Referee: Carl Cheffers
- TV announcers (Fox): Kenny Albert, Jonathan Vilma and Megan Olivi
- Recap, Game Book

Game information

**First quarter**

- NE – Ja'Lynn Polk 5-yard pass from Jacoby Brissett (Joey Slye kick), 4:56. Patriots 7–0. **Drive: 8 plays, 60 yards, 4:53.**
- SEA – DK Metcalf 56-yard pass from Geno Smith (Jason Myers kick), 2:50. Tied 7–7. **Drive: 4 plays, 72 yards, 2:06.**

**Second quarter**

- NE – Joey Slye 29-yard field goal, 11:05. Patriots 10–7. **Drive: 15 plays, 59 yards, 6:45.**
- SEA – Zach Charbonnet 1-yard run (Jason Myers kick), 5:47. Seahawks 14–10. **Drive: 11 plays, 70 yards, 5:18.**
- NE – Joey Slye 28-yard field goal, 2:31. Seahawks 14–13. **Drive: 9 plays, 60 yards, 3:16.**
- SEA – Jason Myers 44-yard field goal, 0:00. Seahawks 17–13. **Drive: 6 plays, 26 yards, 0:35.**

**Third quarter**

- No scoring plays.

**Fourth quarter**

- NE – Rhamondre Stevenson 1-yard run (Joey Slye kick), 12:43. Patriots 20–17. **Drive: 11 plays, 66 yards, 6:20.**
- SEA – Jason Myers 38-yard field goal, 0:55. Tied 20–20. **Drive: 9 plays, 42 yards, 2:59.**

**Overtime**

- SEA – Jason Myers 31-yard field goal, 4:37. Seahawks 23–20. **Drive: 8 plays, 71 yards, 3:35.**

**Top passers**

- SEA – Geno Smith – 33/44, 327 yards, TD
- NE – Jacoby Brissett – 15/27, 149 yards, TD

**Top rushers**

- SEA – Zach Charbonnet – 14 rushes, 38 yards, TD
- NE – Antonio Gibson – 11 rushes, 96 yards

**Top receivers**

- SEA – DK Metcalf – 10 receptions, 129 yards, TD
- NE – Hunter Henry – 8 receptions, 109 yards

==== Week 3: vs. Miami Dolphins ====
Week 3: Miami Dolphins at Seattle Seahawks – Game summary

Quarter	1	2	3	4	Total
Dolphins	3	0	0	0	**3**
**Seahawks**	17	0	0	7	**24**

at Lumen Field, Seattle, Washington

- Date: September 22
- Game time: 1:05 p.m. PDT
- Game weather: Cloudy, 64 °F (18 °C)
- Game attendance: 68,658
- Referee: Land Clark
- TV announcers (CBS): Kevin Harlan, Trent Green and Melanie Collins
- Recap, Game Book

Game information

**First quarter**

- SEA – Jason Myers 56-yard field goal, 10:49. Seahawks 3–0. **Drive: 7 plays, 28 yards, 4:11.**
- SEA – Zach Charbonnet 4-yard run (Jason Myers kick), 6:44. Seahawks 10–0. **Drive: 5 plays, 53 yards, 1:53.**
- MIA – Jason Sanders 23-yard field goal, 0:11. Seahawks 10–3. **Drive: 4 plays, 2 yards, 2:10.**
- SEA – DK Metcalf 71-yard pass from Geno Smith (Jason Myers kick), 0:00. Seahawks 17–3. **Drive: 1 play, 71 yards, 0:11.**

**Second quarter**

- No scoring plays.

**Third quarter**

- No scoring plays.

**Fourth quarter**

- SEA – Zach Charbonnet 10-yard run (Jason Myers kick), 4:55. Seahawks 24–3. **Drive: 11 plays, 98 yards, 5:27.**

**Top passers**

- MIA – Skylar Thompson – 13/19, 107 yards
- SEA – Geno Smith – 26/34, 289 yards, TD, 2 INT

**Top rushers**

- MIA – De'Von Achane – 11 rushes, 30 yards
- SEA – Zach Charbonnet – 18 rushes, 91 yards, 2 TD

**Top receivers**

- MIA – Tyreek Hill – 3 receptions, 40 yards
- SEA – DK Metcalf – 4 receptions, 104 yards, TD

==== Week 4: at Detroit Lions ====
Week 4: Seattle Seahawks at Detroit Lions – Game summary

Quarter	1	2	3	4	Total
Seahawks	0	7	13	9	**29**
**Lions**	7	14	14	7	**42**

at Ford Field, Detroit, Michigan

- Date: September 30
- Game time: 8:15 p.m. EDT/5:15 p.m. PDT
- Game weather: None (indoor stadium)
- Game attendance: 66,658
- Referee: Alex Kemp
- TV announcers (ABC): Joe Buck, Troy Aikman and Lisa Salters
- Recap, Game Book

Game information

**First quarter**

- DET – David Montgomery 1-yard run (Jake Bates kick), 3:11. Lions 7–0. **Drive: 12 plays, 93 yards, 7:21.**

**Second quarter**

- DET – Jahmyr Gibbs 3-yard run (Jake Bates kick), 14:58. Lions 14–0. **Drive: 3 plays, 14 yards, 0:53.**
- SEA – Kenneth Walker III 1-yard run (Jason Myers kick), 10:08. Lions 14–7. **Drive: 10 plays, 70 yards, 4:50.**
- DET – Jahmyr Gibbs 1-yard run (Jake Bates kick), 5:11. Lions 21–7. **Drive: 9 plays, 70 yards, 4:57.**

**Third quarter**

- SEA – AJ Barner 9-yard pass from Geno Smith (Jason Myers kick), 9:46. Lions 21–14. **Drive: 10 plays, 75 yards, 5:14.**
- DET – Amon-Ra St. Brown 7-yard pass from Jared Goff (Jake Bates kick), 6:57. Lions 28–14. **Drive: 5 plays, 70 yards, 2:49.**
- SEA – Kenneth Walker III 1-yard run (pass failed), 3:03. Lions 28–20. **Drive: 8 plays, 80 yards, 3:54.**
- DET – Jameson Williams 70-yard pass from Jared Goff (Jake Bates kick), 2:52. Lions 35–20. **Drive: 1 play, 70 yards, 0:11.**

**Fourth quarter**

- SEA – Kenneth Walker III 21-yard run (Jason Myers kick), 14:48. Lions 35–27. **Drive: 7 plays, 70 yards, 3:04.**
- DET – Amon-Ra St. Brown 8-yard pass from Jared Goff (Jake Bates kick), 5:23. Lions 42–27. **Drive: 7 plays, 80 yards, 3:34.**
- SEA – Jared Goff sacked in the end zone for a safety, 2:05. Lions 42–29.

**Top passers**

- SEA – Geno Smith – 38/56, 395 yards, TD, INT
- DET – Jared Goff – 18/18, 292 yards, TD

**Top rushers**

- SEA – Kenneth Walker III – 12 rushes, 80 yards, 3 TD
- DET – Jahmyr Gibbs – 14 rushes, 78 yards, TD

**Top receivers**

- SEA – DK Metcalf – 7 receptions, 104 yards
- DET – Jameson Williams – 2 receptions, 80 yards, TD

==== Week 5: vs. New York Giants ====
Week 5: New York Giants at Seattle Seahawks – Game summary

Quarter	1	2	3	4	Total
**Giants**	0	10	10	9	**29**
Seahawks	7	3	3	7	**20**

at Lumen Field, Seattle, Washington

- Date: October 6
- Game time: 1:25 p.m. PDT
- Game weather: Mostly Sunny, 61 °F (16 °C)
- Game attendance: 68,306
- Referee: Shawn Smith
- TV announcers (CBS): Andrew Catalon, Tiki Barber, Jason McCourty and A.J Ross
- Recap, Game Book

Game information

**First quarter**

- SEA – Rayshawn Jenkins 102 yard fumble return for touchdown (Jason Myers kick), 2:33. Seahawks 7–0. **Drive: 16 plays, 79 yards, 10:01.**

**Second quarter**

- NYG – Wan'Dale Robinson 7-yard pass from Daniel Jones (Greg Joseph kick), 9:09. Tied 7–7. **Drive: 8 plays, 81 yards, 4:26.**
- NYG – Greg Joseph 38-yard field goal, 0:22. Giants 10–7. **Drive: 12 plays, 58 yards, 5:12.**
- SEA – Jason Myers 43-yard field goal, 0:02. Tied 10–10. **Drive: 3 plays, 45 yards, 0:20.**

**Third quarter**

- NYG – Darius Slayton 30-yard pass from Daniel Jones (Greg Joseph kick), 10:41. Giants 17–10. **Drive: 4 plays, 77 yards, 1:30.**
- SEA – Jason Myers 48-yard field goal, 6:33. Giants 17–13. **Drive: 8 plays, 41 yards, 4:08.**
- NYG – Greg Joseph 31-yard field goal, 0:46. Giants 20–13. **Drive: 11 plays, 60 yards, 5:47.**

**Fourth quarter**

- NYG – Greg Joseph 24-yard field goal, 11:54. Giants 23–13. **Drive: 6 plays, 21 yards, 2:15.**
- SEA – Jaxon Smith-Njigba 5-yard pass from Geno Smith (Jason Myers kick), 2:09. Giants 23–20. **Drive: 14 plays, 95 yards, 3:44.**
- NYG – Blocked field goal returned 60 yards by Bryce Ford-Wheaton, 0:55. Giants 29–20.

**Top passers**

- NYG – Daniel Jones – 23/34, 257 yards, 2 TD
- SEA – Geno Smith – 28/40, 284 yards, TD

**Top rushers**

- NYG – Tyrone Tracy Jr. – 18 rushes, 129 yards
- SEA – Geno Smith – 4 rushes, 72 yards

**Top receivers**

- NYG – Darius Slayton – 8 receptions, 122 yards, TD
- SEA – Tyler Lockett – 4 receptions, 75 yards

==== Week 6: vs. San Francisco 49ers ====
Week 6: San Francisco 49ers at Seattle Seahawks – Game summary

Quarter	1	2	3	4	Total
**49ers**	3	13	7	13	**36**
Seahawks	0	3	14	7	**24**

at Lumen Field, Seattle, Washington

- Date: October 10
- Game time: 5:15 p.m. PDT
- Game weather: Mostly sunny, 59 °F (15 °C)
- Game attendance: 68,768
- Referee: Craig Wrolstad
- TV announcers (KCPQ/Prime Video): Al Michaels, Kirk Herbstreit and Kaylee Hartung
  Game exclusive to KCPQ through syndication. Out of market on Prime Video.
- Recap, Game Book

Game information

**First quarter**

- SF – Matthew Wright 25-yard field goal, 3:58. 49ers 3–0. **Drive: 13 plays, 90 yards, 7:28.**

**Second quarter**

- SF – Deebo Samuel 76-yard pass from Brock Purdy (Matthew Wright kick), 13:30. 49ers 10–0. **Drive: 1 play, 76 yards, 0:12.**
- SF – Matthew Wright 41-yard field goal, 11:47. 49ers 13–0. **Drive: 4 plays, 6 yards, 1:36.**
- SF – Matthew Wright 35-yard field goal, 2:33. 49ers 16–0. **Drive: 14 plays, 77 yards, 7:43.**
- SEA – Jason Myers 20-yard field goal, 0:00. 49ers 16–3. **Drive: 11 plays, 69 yards, 2:33.**

**Third quarter**

- SF – George Kittle 10-yard pass from Brock Purdy (Matthew Wright kick), 10:07. 49ers 23–3. **Drive: 9 plays, 70 yards, 4:53.**
- SEA – Laviska Shenault Jr. 97-yard kick return (Jason Myers kick), 9:54. 49ers 23–10.
- SEA – Kenneth Walker III 1-yard run (Jason Myers kick), 1:24. 49ers 23–17. **Drive: 13 plays, 94 yards, 5:38.**

**Fourth quarter**

- SF – George Kittle 9-yard pass from Brock Purdy (run failed), 6:20. 49ers 29–17. **Drive: 3 plays, 15 yards, 1:26.**
- SEA – Tyler Lockett 9-yard pass from Geno Smith (Jason Myers kick), 1:44. 49ers 29–24. **Drive: 15 plays, 70 yards, 4:36.**
- SF – Kyle Juszczyk 6-yard run (Matthew Wright kick), 1:17. 49ers 36–24. **Drive: 3 plays, 81 yards, 0:27.**

**Top passers**

- SF – Brock Purdy – 18/28, 255 yards, 3 TD
- SEA – Geno Smith – 30/52, 312 yards, TD, 2 INT

**Top rushers**

- SF – Isaac Guerendo – 10 rushes, 99 yards
- SEA – Kenneth Walker III – 14 rushes, 32 yards, TD

**Top receivers**

- SF – Deebo Samuel – 3 receptions, 102 yards, TD
- SEA – Tyler Lockett – 4 receptions, 65 yards, TD

==== Week 7: at Atlanta Falcons ====
Week 7: Seattle Seahawks at Atlanta Falcons – Game summary

Quarter	1	2	3	4	Total
**Seahawks**	3	14	7	10	**34**
Falcons	0	7	7	0	**14**

at Mercedes-Benz Stadium, Atlanta, Georgia

- Date: October 20
- Game time: 1:00 p.m. EDT/10:00 a.m. PDT
- Game weather: Sunny, 72 °F (22 °C) (retractable roof open)
- Game attendance: 70,691
- Referee: Bill Vinovich
- TV announcers (Fox): Kenny Albert, Jonathan Vilma and Megan Olivi
- Recap, Game Book

Game information

**First quarter**

- SEA – Jason Myers 38-yard field goal, 10:05. Seahawks 3–0. **Drive: 11 plays, 56 yards, 4:55.**

**Second quarter**

- SEA – Kenneth Walker III 20-yard run (Jason Myers kick), 9:52. Seahawks 10–0. **Drive: 5 plays, 56 yards, 2:51.**
- ATL – Bijan Robinson 5-yard run (Younghoe Koo kick), 5:18. Seahawks 10–7. **Drive: 9 plays, 70 yards, 4:34.**
- SEA – DK Metcalf 31-yard pass Geno Smith (Jason Myers kick), 0:04. Seahawks 17–7. **Drive: 6 plays, 68 yards, 1:03.**

**Third quarter**

- ATL – Drake London 5-yard pass from Kirk Cousins (Younghoe Koo kick), 7:43. Seahawks 17–14. **Drive: 14 plays, 79 yards, 7:17.**
- SEA – Kenneth Walker III 17-yard pass from Geno Smith (Jason Myers kick), 3:18. Seahawks 24–14. **Drive: 9 plays, 63 yards, 4:25.**

**Fourth quarter**

- SEA – Derick Hall 64-yard fumble return (Jason Myers kick), 12:46. Seahawks 31–14. **Drive: 7 plays, 29 yards, 2:24.**
- SEA – Jason Myers 59-yard field goal, 7:10. Seahawks 34–14. **Drive: 7 plays, 19 yards, 3:45.**

**Top passers**

- SEA – Geno Smith – 18/28, 207 yards, 2 TD
- ATL – Kirk Cousins – 24/35, 232 yards, TD, 2 INT

**Top rushers**

- SEA – Kenneth Walker III – 14 rushes, 69 yards, TD
- ATL – Bijan Robinson – 21 rushes, 103 yards, TD

**Top receivers**

- SEA – DK Metcalf – 4 receptions, 99 yards, TD
- ATL – Kyle Pitts – 7 receptions, 65 yards

==== Week 8: vs. Buffalo Bills ====
Week 8: Buffalo Bills at Seattle Seahawks – Game summary

Quarter	1	2	3	4	Total
**Bills**	7	7	10	7	**31**
Seahawks	0	3	0	7	**10**

at Lumen Field, Seattle, Washington

- Date: October 27
- Game time: 1:05 p.m. PDT
- Game weather: Mostly cloudy, 55 °F (13 °C)
- Game attendance: 68,704
- Referee: Ronald Torbert
- TV announcers (Fox): Kevin Burkhardt, Tom Brady, Erin Andrews and Tom Rinaldi
- Recap, Game Book

Game information

**First quarter**

- BUF – Keon Coleman 2-yard pass from Josh Allen (Tyler Bass kick), 4:51. Bills 7–0. **Drive: 14 plays, 90 yards, 9:07.**

**Second quarter**

- SEA – Jason Myers 38-yard field goal, 8:14. Bills 7–3. **Drive: 13 plays, 71 yards, 7:04.**
- BUF – Dalton Kincaid 12-yard pass from Josh Allen (Tyler Bass kick), 0:18. Bills 14–3. 'Drive: 12 plays, 93 yards, 4:26

**Third quarter**

- BUF – Tyler Bass 27-yard field goal, 8:31. Bills 17–3. **Drive: 11 plays, 69 yards, 6:29.**
- BUF – James Cook 2-yard run (Tyler Bass kick), 1:57. Bills 24–3. **Drive: 7 plays, 51 yards, 4:02.**

**Fourth quarter**

- BUF – James Cook 7-yard run (Tyler Bass kick), 11:19. Bills 31–3. **Drive: 7 plays, 73 yards, 3:44.**
- SEA – Zach Charbonnet 1-yard run (Jason Myers kick), 8:02. Bills 31–10. **Drive: 9 plays, 70 yards, 3:17.**

**Top passers**

- BUF – Josh Allen – 24/34, 283 yards, 2 TD, INT
- SEA – Geno Smith – 21/29, 212 yards, INT

**Top rushers**

- BUF – James Cook – 17 rushes, 111 yards, 2 TD
- SEA – Geno Smith – 5 rushes, 16 yards

**Top receivers**

- BUF – Khalil Shakir – 9 receptions, 107 yards
- SEA – Jaxon Smith-Njigba – 6 receptions, 69 yards

==== Week 9: vs. Los Angeles Rams ====
Week 9: Los Angeles Rams at Seattle Seahawks – Game summary

Quarter	1	2	3	4	OT	Total
**Rams**	0	3	10	7	6	**26**
Seahawks	0	13	0	7	0	**20**

at Lumen Field, Seattle, Washington

- Date: November 3
- Game time: 1:25 p.m. PST
- Game weather: Cloudy, 52 °F (11 °C)
- Game attendance: 68,632
- Referee: Clay Martin
- TV announcers (Fox): Kenny Albert, Jonathan Vilma and Megan Olivi
- Recap, Game Book

Game information

**First quarter**

- No scoring plays.

**Second quarter**

- LAR – Joshua Karty 38-yard field goal, 3:31. Rams 3–0. **Drive: 11 plays, 43 yards, 5:54.**
- SEA – Tyler Lockett 30-yard pass from Geno Smith (kick blocked), 0:51. Seahawks 6–3. **Drive: 9 plays, 70 yards, 2:40.**
- SEA – Jaxon Smith-Njigba 24-yard pass from Geno Smith (Jason Myers kick), 0:05. Seahawks 13–3. **Drive: 3 plays, 60 yards, 0:22.**

**Third quarter**

- LAR – Demarcus Robinson 1-yard pass from Matthew Stafford (Joshua Karty kick), 8:28. Seahawks 13–10. **Drive: 11 plays, 75 yards, 6:32.**
- LAR – Joshua Karty 21-yard field goal, 0:27. Tied 13–13. **Drive: 12 plays, 62 yards, 5:39.**

**Fourth quarter**

- LAR – Kamren Kinchens 103-yard interception return (Joshua Karty kick), 10:59. Rams 20–13.
- SEA – Jaxon Smith-Njigba 14-yard pass from Geno Smith (Jason Myers kick), 0:51. Tied 20–20. **Drive: 8 plays, 73 yards, 1:03.**

**Overtime**

- LAR – Demarcus Robinson 39-yard pass from Matthew Stafford, 4:57. Rams 26–20. **Drive: 4 plays, 83 yards, 2:22.**

**Top passers**

- LAR – Matthew Stafford – 25/44, 298 yards, 2 TD, INT
- SEA – Geno Smith – 21/34, 363 yards, 3 TD, 3 INT

**Top rushers**

- LAR – Kyren Williams – 22 rushes, 69 yards
- SEA – Kenneth Walker III – 25 rushes, 83 yards

**Top receivers**

- LAR – Cooper Kupp – 11 receptions, 104 yards
- SEA – Jaxon Smith-Njigba – 7 receptions, 180 yards, 2 TD

==== Week 11: at San Francisco 49ers ====
Week 11: Seattle Seahawks at San Francisco 49ers – Game summary

Quarter	1	2	3	4	Total
**Seahawks**	3	3	7	7	**20**
49ers	7	0	3	7	**17**

at Levi's Stadium, Santa Clara, California

- Date: November 17
- Game time: 1:05 p.m. PST
- Game weather: Cloudy, 59 °F (15 °C)
- Game attendance: 71,751
- Referee: Brad Rogers
- TV announcers (Fox): Joe Davis, Greg Olsen and Pam Oliver
- Recap, Game Book

Game information

**First quarter**

- SEA – Jason Myers 52-yard field goal, 8:13. Seahawks 3–0. **Drive: 9 plays, 44 yards, 4:33.**
- SF – Brock Purdy 10-yard run (Jake Moody kick), 0:10. 49ers 7–3. **Drive: 12 plays, 71 yards, 8:03.**

**Second quarter**

- SEA – Jason Myers 57-yard field goal, 8:41. 49ers 7–6. **Drive: 4 plays, −10 yards, 1:28.**

**Third quarter**

- SF – Jake Moody 33-yard field goal, 9:26. 49ers 10–6. **Drive: 7 plays, 12 yards, 4:31.**
- SEA – Kenneth Walker III 1-yard run (Jason Myers kick), 3:25. Seahawks 13–10. **Drive: 11 plays, 70 yards, 6:01.**

**Fourth quarter**

- SF – Jauan Jennings 3-yard pass from Brock Purdy (Jake Moody kick), 9:33. 49ers 17–13. **Drive: 14 plays, 70 yards, 8:52.**
- SEA – Geno Smith 13-yard run (Jason Myers kick), 0:12. Seahawks 20–17. **Drive: 11 plays, 80 yards, 2:26.**

**Top passers**

- SEA – Geno Smith – 25/32, 221 yards, INT
- SF – Brock Purdy – 21/28, 159 yards, TD, INT

**Top rushers**

- SEA – Kenneth Walker III – 14 rushes, 54 yards, TD
- SF – Christian McCaffrey – 19 rushes, 79 yards

**Top receivers**

- SEA – Jaxon Smith-Njigba – 10 receptions, 110 yards
- SF – Jauan Jennings – 10 receptions, 91 yards, TD

==== Week 12: vs. Arizona Cardinals ====
Week 12: Arizona Cardinals at Seattle Seahawks – Game summary

Quarter	1	2	3	4	Total
Cardinals	0	3	0	3	**6**
**Seahawks**	0	7	6	3	**16**

at Lumen Field, Seattle, Washington

- Date: November 24
- Game time: 1:25 p.m. PST
- Game weather: Cloudy, 45 °F (7 °C)
- Game attendance: 68,649
- Referee: Scott Novak
- TV announcers (Fox): Adam Amin, Mark Sanchez and Kristina Pink
- Recap, Game Book

Game information

**First quarter**

- No scoring plays.

**Second quarter**

- ARI – Chad Ryland 35-yard field goal, 9:43. Cardinals 3–0. **Drive: 6 plays, 33 yards, 2:55.**
- SEA – Jaxon Smith-Njigba 3-yard pass from Geno Smith (Jason Myers kick), 1:14. Seahawks 7–3. **Drive: 7 plays, 61 yards, 3:25.**

**Third quarter**

- SEA – Coby Bryant 69-yard interception return (kick failed, wide left), 7:12. Seahawks 13–3.

**Fourth quarter**

- ARI – Chad Ryland 22-yard field goal, 10:08. Seahawks 13–6. **Drive: 11 plays, 76 yards, 4:43.**
- SEA – Jason Myers 50-yard field goal, 1:56. Seahawks 16–6. **Drive: 13 plays, 49 yards, 8:12.**

**Top passers**

- ARI – Kyler Murray – 24/37, 285 yards, INT
- SEA – Geno Smith – 22/31, 254 yards, TD, INT

**Top rushers**

- ARI – Trey Benson – 4 rushes, 18 yards
- SEA – Kenneth Walker III – 16 rushes, 41 yards

**Top receivers**

- ARI – Trey McBride – 12 receptions, 133 yards
- SEA – Jaxon Smith-Njigba – 6 receptions, 77 yards, TD

==== Week 13: at New York Jets ====
Week 13: Seattle Seahawks at New York Jets – Game summary

Quarter	1	2	3	4	Total
**Seahawks**	0	16	0	10	**26**
Jets	14	7	0	0	**21**

at MetLife Stadium, East Rutherford, New Jersey

- Date: December 1
- Game time: 1:00 p.m. EST/10:00 a.m. PST
- Game weather: Sunny, 37 °F (3 °C)
- Game attendance: 81,084
- Referee: Carl Cheffers
- TV announcers (Fox): Adam Amin, Mark Sanchez and Kristina Pink
- Recap, Game Book

Game information

**First quarter**

- NYJ – Davante Adams 8-yard pass from Aaron Rodgers (kick blocked), 3:25. Jets 6–0. **Drive: 11 plays, 80 yards, 6:01.**
- NYJ – Isaiah Davis 4-yard pass from Aaron Rodgers (Breece Hall run), 1:47. Jets 14–0. **Drive: 4 plays, 27 yards, 1:31.**

**Second quarter**

- SEA – AJ Barner 12-yard pass from Geno Smith (Jason Myers kick), 10:53. Jets 14–7. **Drive: 10 plays, 88 yards, 5:54.**
- NYJ – Kene Nwangwu 99-yard kickoff return (Anders Carlson kick), 10:40. Jets 21–7.
- SEA – Leonard Williams 92-yard interception return (kick blocked), 7:39. Jets 21–13.
- SEA – Jason Myers 54-yard field goal, 4:15. Jets 21–16. **Drive: 5 plays, 16 yards, 1:42.**

**Third quarter**

- No scoring plays.

**Fourth quarter**

- SEA – Jason Myers 43-yard field goal, 13:11. Jets 21–19. **Drive: 10 plays, 34 yards, 5:05.**
- SEA – Zach Charbonnet 3-yard run (Jason Myers kick), 5:34. Seahawks 26–21. **Drive: 9 plays, 71 yards, 6:03.**

**Top passers**

- SEA – Geno Smith – 20/31, 206 yards, TD
- NYJ – Aaron Rodgers – 21/39, 185 yards, 2 TD, INT

**Top rushers**

- SEA – Kenneth Walker III – 16 rushes, 49 yards
- NYJ – Breece Hall – 12 rushes, 60 yards

**Top receivers**

- SEA – Jaxon Smith-Njigba – 4 receptions, 74 yards
- NYJ – Davante Adams – 5 receptions, 66 yards, TD

==== Week 14: at Arizona Cardinals ====
Week 14: Seattle Seahawks at Arizona Cardinals – Game summary

Quarter	1	2	3	4	Total
**Seahawks**	17	7	3	3	**30**
Cardinals	7	3	8	0	**18**

at State Farm Stadium, Glendale, Arizona

- Date: December 8
- Game time: 2:05 p.m. MST/1:05 p.m. PST
- Game weather: Sunny, 71 °F (22 °C) (retractable roof open)
- Game attendance: 64,533
- Referee: Clay Martin
- TV announcers (CBS): Ian Eagle, Charles Davis and Evan Washburn
- Recap, Game Book

Game information

**First quarter**

- ARI – Michael Wilson 41-yard pass from Kyler Murray (Chad Ryland kick), 11:53. Cardinals 7–0. **Drive: 6 plays, 70 yards, 3:07.**
- SEA – Jason Myers 20-yard field goal, 4:41. Cardinals 7–3. **Drive: 13 plays, 71 yards, 7:12.**
- SEA – Jaxon Smith-Njigba 19-yard pass from Geno Smith (Jason Myers kick), 3:25. Seahawks 10–7. **Drive: 1 play, 19 yards, 0:06.**
- SEA – Zach Charbonnet 1-yard run (Jason Myers kick), 0:16. Seahawks 17–7. **Drive: 5 plays, 46 yards, 2:28.**

**Second quarter**

- ARI – Chad Ryland 28-yard field goal, 10:53. Seahawks 17–10. **Drive: 10 plays, 61 yards, 4:23.**
- SEA – Zach Charbonnet 51-yard run (Jason Myers kick), 2:36. Seahawks 24–10. **Drive: 5 plays, 80 yards, 3:15.**

**Third quarter**

- SEA – Jason Myers 36-yard field goal, 5:29. Seahawks 27–10. **Drive: 10 plays, 45 yards, 5:30.**
- ARI – James Conner 2-yard pass from Kyler Murray (Kyler Murray run), 1:05. Seahawks 27–18. **Drive: 12 plays, 70 yards, 4:24.**

**Fourth quarter**

- SEA – Jason Myers 35-yard field goal, 1:56. Seahawks 30–18. **Drive: 12 plays, 53 yards, 5:20.**

**Top passers**

- SEA – Geno Smith – 24/30, 233 yards, TD
- ARI – Kyler Murray – 25/38, 259 yards, 2 TD, 2 INT

**Top rushers**

- SEA – Zach Charbonnet – 22 rushes, 134 yards, 2 TD
- ARI – James Conner – 18 rushes, 90 yards

**Top receivers**

- SEA – Jaxon Smith-Njigba – 5 receptions, 82 yards, TD
- ARI – Trey McBride – 7 receptions, 70 yards

==== Week 15: vs. Green Bay Packers ====
Week 15: Green Bay Packers at Seattle Seahawks – Game summary

Quarter	1	2	3	4	Total
**Packers**	14	6	3	7	**30**
Seahawks	0	3	3	7	**13**

at Lumen Field, Seattle, Washington

- Date: December 15
- Game time: 5:20 p.m. PST
- Game weather: Cloudy, 43 °F (6 °C)
- Game attendance: 68,766
- Referee: Clete Blakeman
- TV announcers (NBC): Mike Tirico, Cris Collinsworth and Melissa Stark
- Recap, Game Book

Game information

**First quarter**

- GB – Josh Jacobs 1-yard run (Brandon McManus kick), 9:19. Packers 7–0. **Drive: 10 plays, 63 yards, 5:41.**
- GB – Romeo Doubs 13-yard pass from Jordan Love (Brandon McManus kick), 1:54. Packers 14–0. **Drive: 8 plays, 80 yards, 4:49.**

**Second quarter**

- SEA – Jason Myers 48-yard field goal, 12:59. Packers 14–3. **Drive: 7 plays, 40 yards, 3:55.**
- GB – Brandon McManus 39-yard field goal, 9:21. Packers 17–3. **Drive: 8 plays, 51 yards, 3:38.**
- GB – Brandon McManus 21-yard field goal, 0:00. Packers 20–3. **Drive: 7 plays, 83 yards, 2:54.**

**Third quarter**

- SEA – Jason Myers 45-yard field goal, 6:20. Packers 20–6. **Drive: 5 plays, 20 yards, 1:26.**
- GB – Brandon McManus 23-yard field goal, 1:36. Packers 23–6. **Drive: 7 plays, 65 yards, 4:44.**

**Fourth quarter**

- SEA – Zach Charbonnet 24-yard run (Jason Myers kick), 11:16. Packers 23–13. **Drive: 5 plays, 45 yards, 1:28.**
- GB – Romeo Doubs 22-yard pass from Jordan Love (Brandon McManus kick), 4:59. Packers 30–13. **Drive: 3 plays, 27 yards, 0:18.**

**Top passers**

- GB – Jordan Love – 20/27, 229 yards, 2 TD
- SEA – Geno Smith – 15/19, 149 yards, INT

**Top rushers**

- GB – Josh Jacobs – 26 rushes, 94 yards, TD
- SEA – Zach Charbonnet – 8 rushes, 54 yards, TD

**Top receivers**

- GB – Christian Watson – 3 receptions, 56 yards
- SEA – Jaxon Smith-Njigba – 10 receptions, 83 yards

==== Week 16: vs. Minnesota Vikings ====
Week 16: Minnesota Vikings at Seattle Seahawks – Game summary

Quarter	1	2	3	4	Total
**Vikings**	7	10	3	7	**27**
Seahawks	0	14	3	7	**24**

at Lumen Field, Seattle, Washington

- Date: December 22
- Game time: 1:05 p.m. PST
- Game weather: Rain, 48 °F (9 °C)
- Game attendance: 68,748
- Referee: Craig Wrolstad
- TV announcers (Fox): Adam Amin, Mark Sanchez and Kristina Pink
- Recap, Game Book

Game information

**First quarter**

- MIN – Jordan Addison 5-yard pass from Sam Darnold (Will Reichard kick), 8:06. Vikings 7–0. **Drive: 12 plays, 70 yards, 6:54.**

**Second quarter**

- SEA – DK Metcalf 25-yard pass from Geno Smith (Jason Myers kick), 13:35. Tied 7–7. **Drive: 7 plays, 87 yards, 4:03.**
- MIN – Justin Jefferson 14-yard pass from Sam Darnold (Will Reichard kick), 5:50. Vikings 14–7. **Drive: 8 plays, 67 yards, 4:39.**
- MIN – Will Reichard 52-yard field goal, 3:33. Vikings 17–7. **Drive: 4 plays, −3 yards, 2:09.**
- SEA – Jaxon Smith-Njigba 18-yard pass from Geno Smith (Jason Myers kick), 0:20. Vikings 17–14. **Drive: 5 plays, 88 yards, 1:05.**

**Third quarter**

- SEA – Jason Myers 43-yard field goal, 10:37. Tied 17–17. **Drive: 8 plays, 40 yards, 4:23.**
- MIN – Will Reichard 48-yard field goal, 6:25. Vikings 20–17. **Drive: 8 plays, 40 yards, 4:12.**

**Fourth quarter**

- SEA – AJ Barner 4-yard pass from Geno Smith (Jason Myers kick), 4:21. Seahawks 24–20. **Drive: 11 plays, 68 yards, 6:16.**
- MIN – Justin Jefferson 39-yard pass from Sam Darnold (Will Reichard kick), 3:51. Vikings 27–24. **Drive: 4 plays, 70 yards, 0:30.**

**Top passers**

- MIN – Sam Darnold – 22/35, 246 yards, 3 TD
- SEA – Geno Smith – 31/43, 315 yards, 3 TD, 2 INT

**Top rushers**

- MIN – Aaron Jones – 18 rushes, 67 yards
- SEA – Kenneth Walker III – 8 rushes, 31 yards

**Top receivers**

- MIN – Justin Jefferson – 10 receptions, 144 yards, 2 TD
- SEA – Jaxon Smith-Njigba – 8 receptions, 95 yards, TD

==== Week 17: at Chicago Bears ====
Week 17: Seattle Seahawks at Chicago Bears – Game summary

Quarter	1	2	3	4	Total
**Seahawks**	3	3	0	0	**6**
Bears	0	3	0	0	**3**

at Soldier Field, Chicago, Illinois

- Date: December 26
- Game time: 7:15 p.m. CST/5:15 p.m. PST
- Game weather: Mostly cloudy, 47 °F (8 °C)
- Game attendance: 56,346
- Referee: Scott Novak
- TV announcers (KCPQ/Prime Video): Al Michaels, Kirk Herbstreit and Kaylee Hartung
  Game exclusive to KCPQ through syndication. Out of market on Prime Video.
- Recap, Game Book

Game information

**First quarter**

- SEA – Jason Myers 27-yard field goal, 8:59. Seahawks 3–0. **Drive: 11 plays, 71 yards, 6:01.**

**Second quarter**

- CHI – Cairo Santos 42-yard field goal, 2:32. Tied 3–3. **Drive: 13 plays, 67 yards, 7:47.**
- SEA – Jason Myers 50-yard field goal, 0:21. Seahawks 6–3. **Drive: 8 plays, 38 yards, 2:11.**

**Third quarter**

- No scoring plays.

**Fourth quarter**

- No scoring plays.

**Top passers**

- SEA – Geno Smith – 17/23, 160 yards
- CHI – Caleb Williams – 16/28, 122 yards, INT

**Top rushers**

- SEA – Zach Charbonnet – 15 rushes, 57 yards
- CHI – D'Andre Swift – 12 rushes, 53 yards

**Top receivers**

- SEA – Noah Fant – 4 receptions, 43 yards
- CHI – D. J. Moore – 6 receptions, 54 yards

Despite winning the game, the Seahawks were later eliminated from playoff contention after the Rams defeated the Cardinals and clinched the Strength of Victory tiebreaker over the Seahawks with wins by the Bengals, Bills, Vikings and Commanders.

==== Week 18: at Los Angeles Rams ====
Week 18: Seattle Seahawks at Los Angeles Rams – Game summary

Quarter	1	2	3	4	Total
**Seahawks**	7	10	7	6	**30**
Rams	3	10	3	9	**25**

at SoFi Stadium, Inglewood, California

- Date: January 5
- Game time: 1:25 p.m. PST
- Game weather: Sunny, 76 °F (24 °C) (fixed roof)
- Game attendance: 72,610
- Referee: Bill Vinovich
- TV announcers (Fox): Kenny Albert, Jonathan Vilma and Megan Olivi
- Recap, Game Book

Game information

**First quarter**

- SEA – Jake Bobo 4-yard pass from Geno Smith (Jason Myers kick), 5:21. Seahawks 7–0. **Drive: 5 plays, 55 yards, 3:11.**
- LAR – Joshua Karty 37-yard field goal, 0:37. Seahawks 7–3. **Drive: 9 plays, 44 yards, 4:44.**

**Second quarter**

- SEA – DK Metcalf 20-yard pass from Geno Smith (Jason Myers kick), 12:48. Seahawks 14–3. **Drive: 7 plays, 70 yards, 2:49.**
- LAR – Tyler Higbee 6-yard pass from Jimmy Garoppolo (Joshua Karty kick), 8:47. Seahawks 14–10. **Drive: 8 plays, 78 yards, 4:01.**
- SEA – Jason Myers 56-yard field goal, 3:21. Seahawks 17–10. **Drive: 9 plays, 35 yards, 5:26.**
- LAR – Joshua Karty 58-yard field goal, 0:00. Seahawks 17–13. **Drive: 5 plays, 40 yards, 0:53.**

**Third quarter**

- LAR – Joshua Karty 57-yard field goal, 7:54. Seahawks 17–16. **Drive: 9 plays, 40 yards, 5:28.**
- SEA – AJ Barner 4-yard pass from Geno Smith (Jason Myers kick), 3:00. Seahawks 24–16. **Drive: 10 plays, 70 yards, 4:54.**

**Fourth quarter**

- LAR – Tyler Johnson 4-yard pass from Jimmy Garoppolo (pass failed), 12:43. Seahawks 24–22. **Drive: 9 plays, 70 yards, 5:17.**
- LAR – Joshua Karty 38-yard field goal, 7:29. Rams 25–24. **Drive: 7 plays, 58 yards, 3:42.**
- SEA – Noah Fant 16-yard pass from Geno Smith (pass failed), 3:19. Seahawks 30–25. **Drive: 8 plays, 70 yards, 4:10.**

**Top passers**

- SEA – Geno Smith – 20/27, 223 yards, 4 TD
- LAR – Jimmy Garoppolo – 27/41, 334 yards, 2 TD, INT

**Top rushers**

- SEA – Zach Charbonnet – 14 rushes, 59 yards
- LAR – Ronnie Rivers – 12 rushes, 48 yards

**Top receivers**

- SEA – Noah Fant – 5 receptions, 63 yards, TD
- LAR – Jordan Whittington – 3 receptions, 86 yards

=== Standings ===
==== Division ====
NFC West
	W	L	T	PCT	DIV	CONF	PF	PA	STK
^{(4)} Los Angeles Rams	10	7	0	.588	4–2	6–6	367	386	L1
Seattle Seahawks	10	7	0	.588	4–2	6–6	375	368	W2
Arizona Cardinals	8	9	0	.471	3–3	4–8	400	379	W1
San Francisco 49ers	6	11	0	.353	1–5	4–8	389	436	L4

==== Conference ====
NFC
Seed	Team	Division	W	L	T	PCT	DIV	CONF	SOS	SOV	STK
**Division leaders**
1	Detroit Lions	North	15	2	0	.882	6–0	11–1	.516	.494	W3
2	Philadelphia Eagles	East	14	3	0	.824	5–1	9–3	.453	.424	W2
3 (Note: Tampa Bay clinched the #3 seed over Los Angeles based on conference record. (Tampa Bay 8–4 to Los Angeles 6–6))	Tampa Bay Buccaneers	South	10	7	0	.588	4–2	8–4	.502	.465	W2
4 (Note: Los Angeles clinched the NFC West and #4 seed over Seattle based on strength of victory. (Los Angeles .441 to Seattle .424))	Los Angeles Rams	West	10	7	0	.588	4–2	6–6	.505	.441	L1
**Wild cards**
5	Minnesota Vikings	North	14	3	0	.824	4–2	9–3	.474	.408	L1
6	Washington Commanders	East	12	5	0	.706	4–2	9–3	.436	.358	W5
7	Green Bay Packers	North	11	6	0	.647	1–5	6–6	.533	.412	L2
**Did not qualify for the postseason**
8	Seattle Seahawks	West	10	7	0	.588	4–2	6–6	.498	.424	W2
9 (Note: Atlanta finished ahead of Arizona based on conference record. (Atlanta 7–5 to Arizona 4–8))	Atlanta Falcons	South	8	9	0	.471	4–2	7–5	.519	.426	L2
10	Arizona Cardinals	West	8	9	0	.471	3–3	4–8	.536	.404	W1
11	Dallas Cowboys	East	7	10	0	.412	3–3	5–7	.522	.387	L2
12	San Francisco 49ers	West	6	11	0	.353	1–5	4–8	.564	.402	L4
13 (Note: Chicago finished ahead of Carolina based on head-to-head victory.)	Chicago Bears	North	5	12	0	.294	1–5	3–9	.554	.388	W1
14 (Note: Carolina finished ahead of New Orleans based on strength of victory. (Carolina .329 to New Orleans .306))	Carolina Panthers	South	5	12	0	.294	2–4	4–8	.498	.329	W1
15	New Orleans Saints	South	5	12	0	.294	2–4	4–8	.505	.306	L4
16	New York Giants	East	3	14	0	.176	0–6	1–11	.554	.412	L1
**Tiebreakers** (Note: When breaking ties for three or more teams under the NFL's rules, they are first broken within divisions, then comparing only the highest ranked remaining team from each division.)
