= Antonio Harmon =

American football player (born 2002)

No. 8 – Marshall Thundering Herd
- Position: Wide receiver
- Class: Redshirt Junior

Personal information
- Born: June 5, 2002 (age 24)
- Listed height: 6 ft 3 in (1.91 m)
- Listed weight: 200 lb (91 kg)

Career information
- High school: Kosciusko (Kosciusko, Mississippi)
- College: Mississippi State (2021–2024); Marshall (2025–present)
- Stats at ESPN

Antonio Cordarius Harmon (born June 5, 2002) is an American college football wide receiver for the Marshall Thundering Herd. He previously played for the Mississippi State Bulldogs.

== Early life ==
Harmon grew up in Kosciusko, Mississippi and attended Kosciusko High School where he lettered in football and basketball. In his high school career, Harmon made 17 carries for 86 yards and two touchdowns. Harmon would also hauling in 66 receptions for 1,280 yards and 14 touchdowns. Harmon was a three-star rated recruit and would decide to commit to play college football at Mississippi State University over offers from Georgia, Louisville, LSU, Ole Miss, Oregon, SMU, Southern Miss, Texas, Tulane and Virginia.

== College career ==
During Harmon's true freshman season in 2021, he appeared in two games, playing against Tennessee State and Texas Tech during the 2021 Liberty Bowl and would ultimately be redshirted. During the 2022 season, he appeared in five games, finishing the season with five receptions for 61 yards. During the 2023 season, he appeared in all 12 games and started one of them as a tight end, finishing the season with 14 receptions for 98 yards and a touchdown. He also made one kick return attempt for three yards and one solo tackle.

On December 5, 2024, Harmon announced that he would enter the NCAA transfer portal.

=== Marshall ===
On December 23, 2024, Harmon announced that he would transfer to Marshall.
