= Central Mississippi College =

American school (1893–?)

- Kosciusko, Attala County, Mississippi, U.S.

Information
- School type: Private Black grammar school, high school, normal school, junior college
- Established: 1893
- Newspaper: Central Mississippi College Gazette

Central Mississippi College was a segregated school for African American students established in 1893 by Baptist associations in Kosciusko, Mississippi, U.S. The school served in many capacities, including in its early history as a grammar school, a high school, and a normal school; and in later history it was a junior college (college extension school).

== History ==
Central Mississippi College opened in 1893. The school curriculum included tailoring, dressmaking, milinary, gardening, photography, typography, printmaking, and music. The educational journal, the Central Mississippi College Gazette was published by the school.

In 1908, school attendance was 336 students, with 8 teachers. By 1913, the school attendance was 158 students. William Avery Singleton served as the school president in c. 1910–1913. S. S. Lynch was school president in c. 1949–1953.

Kosciusko Industrial Institute was a different Baptist school for African Americans, also located in Kosciusko, Mississippi.

== See also ==
- List of historically black colleges and universities
