= 2023 ReliaQuest Bowl =

Postseason college football bowl game

- 37th ReliaQuest Bowl
Mississippi State Bulldogs	Illinois Fighting Illini
(8–4)	(8–4)
SEC	Big Ten
19	10
Head coach: Zach Arnett	Head coach: Bret Bielema
AP / Coaches / CFP; 24 / 23 / 22
	1	2	3	4	Total
Mississippi State	0	3	0	16	19
Illinois	0	7	3	0	10
- Date: January 2, 2023
- Season: 2022
- Stadium: Raymond James Stadium
- Location: Tampa, Florida
- MVP: Justin Robinson (WR, Mississippi State)
- Favorite: Illinois by 1
- Referee: Adam Savoie (ACC)
- Attendance: 35,797
- Payout: US$6,666,667

United States TV coverage
- Network: ESPN2
- Announcers: Dave Flemming (play-by-play), Rod Gilmore (analyst), and Tiffany Blackmon (sideline) (ESPN2)

The 2023 ReliaQuest Bowl was a college football bowl game played on January 2, 2023, at Raymond James Stadium in Tampa, Florida. The 37th annual ReliaQuest Bowl (previously known as the Outback Bowl from 1996 through 2022), the game featured the Mississippi State Bulldogs from the Southeastern Conference and the Illinois Fighting Illini from the Big Ten Conference. The game began at 12:03 p.m. EST and was aired on ESPN2. It was one of the 2022–23 bowl games concluding the 2022 FBS football season. Cybersecurity company ReliaQuest was the game's title sponsor.

== Teams ==
Consistent with conference tie-ins, the game featured teams from the Big Ten Conference and the Southeastern Conference (SEC). The bowl also has a tie-in with the Atlantic Coast Conference (ACC) when the ACC's opponent in the Orange Bowl is a Big Ten team, in which case an ACC team is selected for the ReliaQuest Bowl.

This was the third meeting between the two teams; in their two prior matchups, Illinois won in 1923 and Mississippi State won in 1980.

=== Mississippi State Bulldogs ===
Mississippi State compiled an 8–4 record during the regular season, finishing with a 24–22 win over rival Ole Miss in the Egg Bowl. In five games against ranked opponents, the Bulldogs defeated Texas A&M and Ole Miss while losing to Kentucky, Alabama, and Georgia. The team was coached during the regular season by Mike Leach. Following Leach's death on December 12, Zach Arnett was elevated to head coach, including for the team's bowl game.

=== Illinois Fighting Illini ===
Illinois finished the regular season with an 8–4 record, losing three of their final four games. Their only contest against a ranked FBS opponent was a loss to Michigan.

== Game summary ==
2023 ReliaQuest Bowl

Quarter	1	2	3	4	Total
No. 22 Mississippi State	0	3	0	16	19
Illinois	0	7	3	0	10

at Raymond James Stadium • Tampa, Florida

- Date: Monday, January 2, 2023
- Game time: 12:00 p.m. EST
- Game weather: Sunny • Temperature: 76 °F (24 °C) • Wind: 6 mph (9.7 km/h) west
- Game attendance: 35,797
- TV announcers (ESPN2): Dave Flemming (play-by-play), Rod Gilmore (analyst), and Tiffany Blackmon (sideline)
- Box score

Scoring summary

Quarter	Time	Drive			Team	Scoring information	Score	
Quarter	Time	Plays	Yards	TOP	Team	Scoring information	Mississippi State	Illinois
2	2:49	10	77	4:45	Illinois	Tommy DeVito 2-yard touchdown run, Caleb Griffin kick good	0	7
2	0:09	8	55	2:40	Miss. State	38-yard field goal by Massimo Biscardi	3	7
3	6:57	11	45	5:13	Illinois	52-yard field goal by Caleb Griffin	3	10
4	14:54	13	75	7:03	Miss. State	Justin Robinson 8-yard touchdown reception from Will Rogers, Massimo Biscardi kick good	10	10
4	0:04	9	68	1:46	Miss. State	27-yard field goal by Massimo Biscardi	13	10
4	0:00				Miss. State	Fumble recovery returned 60 yards for touchdown by Marcus Banks, kick not attempted	19	10
"TOP" = time of possession. For other American football terms, see Glossary of American football.							19	10

The final play of the game, a desperation lateral pass play by Illinois, resulted in Mississippi State intercepting a lateral for the game-clinching touchdown. This play was compared to a similar play between the New England Patriots and Las Vegas Raiders during the NFL's regular season that year and was noted to benefit bettors who had picked Mississippi State to cover the spread.

== Statistics ==
Team statistical comparison
Statistic	Mississippi State	Illinois
First downs	21	19
First downs rushing	4	7
First downs passing	17	9
First downs penalty	0	3
Third down efficiency	6–14	3–11
Fourth down efficiency	1–1	0–0
Total plays–net yards	67–390	62–215
Rushing attempts–net yards	22–116	28–22
Yards per rush	5.3	0.8
Yards passing	274	193
Pass completions–attempts	30–45	23–34
Interceptions thrown	2	0
Punt returns–total yards	2–10	2–10
Kickoff returns–total yards	0–0	4–70
Punts–average yardage	5–42.0	6–47.7
Fumbles–lost	1–0	1–1
Penalties–yards	6–55	3–25
Time of possession	28:11	31:49

Mississippi State statistics
Bulldogs passing
	C–A	Yds	TD–INT
Will Rogers	29–44	261	1–2
Jaden Walley	1–1	13	0–0
Bulldogs rushing
	Car	Yds	TD
Simeon Price	7	68	0
Jo'Quavious Marks	10	50	0
Will Rogers	3	7	0
Team	2	-9	0
Bulldogs receiving
	Rec	Yds	TD
Justin Robinson	7	81	1
Lideatrick Griffin	5	53	0
Jaden Walley	5	43	0
Rufus Harvey	3	33	0
Austin Williams	2	22	0
Jo'quavious Marks	3	14	0
Will Rogers	1	13	0
Caleb Ducking	2	10	0
Simeon Price	1	5	0
J.J. Jernighan	1	0	0

Illinois statistics
Fighting Illini passing
	C–A	Yds	TD–INT
Tommy DeVito	23–34	253	0–0
Fighting Illini rushing
	Car	Yds	TD
Reggie Love III	12	53	0
Josh McCray	7	17	0
Tommy DeVito	10	-35	1
Fighting Illini receiving
	Rec	Yds	TD
Isaiah Williams	9	114	0
Casey Washington	8	74	0
Tip Reiman	2	18	0
Griffin Moore	1	17	0
Michael Marchese	2	10	0
Reggie Love III	1	7	0
Tommy DeVito	0 †	-47	0

† Tommy DeVito's receiving yardage occurred on the final play of the game, following an initial pass from DeVito to Casey Washington. After several laterals, DeVito fumbled the ball, which was returned by Mississippi State for a touchdown. Statbroadcast credits DeVito with -47 receiving yards, while ESPN credits DeVito with 13 receiving yards.

== See also ==
- 2022 Gasparilla Bowl, contested at the same venue on December 23
