= Eugene A. Ford =

American Engineer (1866-1948)

- Born: May 21, 1866; Kosciusko, Mississippi
- Died: September 4, 1948 (aged 82); New York City, NY
- Occupations: First Chief Engineer, IBM
- Spouse: Sarah Imogene Sayles
- Parent(s): John Nicholas Ford & Elizabeth Boyd

Eugene Amzi Ford (May 21, 1866 - September 4, 1948) was an inventor who was instrumental in the development of the Hollerith punch card machines and became the first chief engineer for IBM. Even though he had no formal technical training, he made lasting contributions to the development of machines that could count large volumes of data at scale, marking the key link between the Industrial Revolution and the computing era. As the first head of research and development, the long line of inventors and distinguished engineers from IBM can trace their corporate lineage back to Eugene Ford.

== Early life ==
Eugene A. Ford was born and raised in Kosciusko, Mississippi, to John Nicholas Ford and Elizabeth Boyd. Details of his early life are not clear, but it appears he was part of the Mississippi branch of the Ford family, unrelated to the Michigan Ford family, which produced Henry Ford.

== Career ==
Accounts of his early career indicate he was the inventor of a device to measure the distance of land without the need for a chain. The device used pegs on a wheel to connect with a counting device that would incrementally keep track of the distance each time the peg connected with the counter. This idea appeared to spring from his own work as a "chain man" on a Texas surveying crew.

Later, he invented the first aluminum, front striking typewriter, the Ford Typewriter. While not a commercial success, it led him to a relationship with the Taft-Peirce manufacturing company of Woonsocket, Rhode Island.

Through this relationship, he met his wife, Sarah Imogene Sayles, from nearby Uxbridge, Massachusetts, where he settled and started a family.

Also through his contact with Taft-Peirce, he became acquainted with Herman Hollerith, who had invented early punch card systems. The two began a working relationship where Ford would work to refine and improve the designs, and provide the technical oversight for the manufacture of these early machines at the Taft-Peirce factory in Woonsocket. To facilitate his work, Ford kept a lab in Uxbridge.

Over time, as Hollerith's business grew, it was acquired with other businesses to form what eventually became IBM. Ford stayed on through the acquisition and merger, with special permission to continue to work from Uxbridge, where he kept his lab running. Effectively, this became the first research and development lab for IBM. He continued to run the lab from Uxbridge until IBM eventually moved him and his family to New York City in 1914 at the request of IBM CEO Thomas J. Watson.

== Patents ==
Ford continued to refine and invent equipment for IBM through his career. In total, 89 patents were granted to Ford. Notable examples include:

- Type writing machine (1893)
- Friction Clutch (1913)
- Balanced internal-combustion motor (1915)
- Perforation-reading device for sorting machines (1927)
- Counter for Tabulating Machines (1932)
- Printing Counter for Sorting Machines (1933)
