= Magnolia Bible College =

Defunct Christian college in Kosciusko, Mississippi, U.S.

Coordinates: 33.047436°N 89.583193°W

- Other name: MBC
- Motto: "Preparing Preachers and Training Teachers"
- Type: Private
- Active: 1976–December 17, 2009
- Affiliations: Churches of Christ
- Location: Kosciusko, Mississippi, USA

Magnolia Bible College (abbrev. MBC) was a private Christian Bible college, in Mississippi. Founded in 1976, it was affiliated with the Churches of Christ. The founding church was the South Huntington Church of Christ, with an aim for training preachers and teachers for service within churches of Christ. The college was located in Kosciusko, Mississippi, USA, and offered the B.A., the B.S., and the B.Th. degrees in Bible. The degrees awarded by MBC were available to both men and women, regardless of religious affiliation.

The college was accredited by the Commission on Colleges of the Southern Association of Colleges and Schools and offered general education courses which were fully transferable to other institutions of higher learning.

Due to stringent financial hardships, Magnolia Bible College closed on December 17, 2009. Its sister-school, Freed-Hardeman University, now serves as MBC's retainer (e.g. official records, transcript requests).

== Presidents ==
The college was served by six presidents during its existence. Rod Tate served from 1976 – ?. William T. Lambert succeeded Tate, and served as interim President until May 1980. Cecil May, Jr. served from May 1980 until December 1997. Gary W. Kirkendall was president from January 1997 to 2001. Les Ferguson Sr. served from 2001 to August 1, 2005. Garvis Semore served from July 2005 until he was hired by Freed-Hardeman University, just a few months before the Board announced their intentions to close the college.
