= Steve Spurrier Jr. =

American football coach (born 1971)

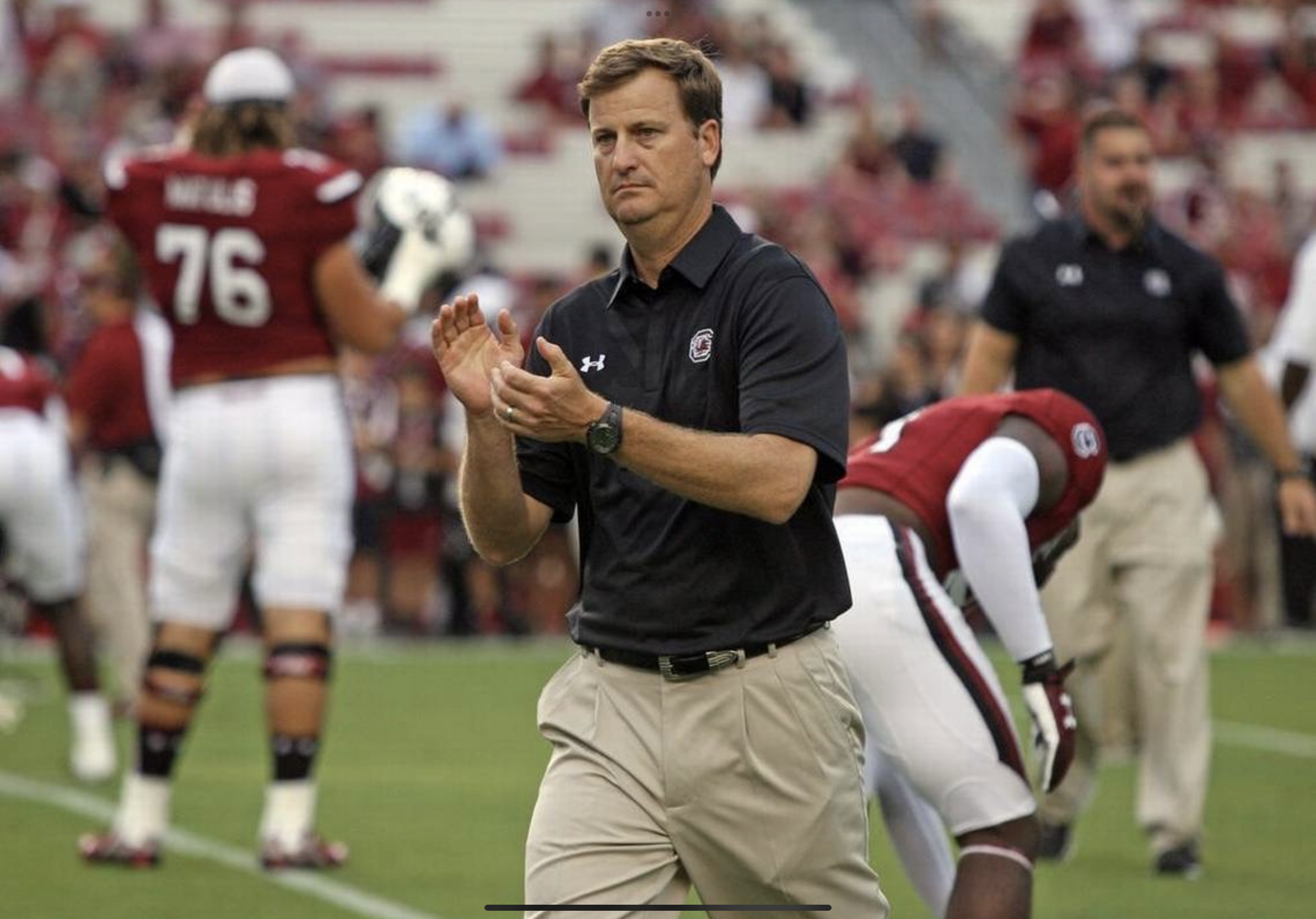
- Spurrier Jr. on field during pregame

Current position
- Title: Offensive Analyst
- Team: Florida
- Conference: SEC

Biographical details
- Born: September 26, 1971 (age 55); Palo Alto, California, U.S.
- Education: Duke University (BA); University of Florida (MA)

Playing career
- 1989–1993: Duke
- Position: Wide receiver

Coaching career (HC unless noted)
- 1994–1998: Florida (GA)
- 1999–2001: Oklahoma (WR)
- 2002–2003: Washington Redskins (WR)
- 2004: Arizona (OA)
- 2005–2008: South Carolina (WR)
- 2009–2010: South Carolina (PGC/WR)
- 2011: South Carolina (PGC/WR/RC)
- 2012–2015: South Carolina (co-OC/PGC/WR/RC)
- 2016: Oklahoma (OA)
- 2017: Western Kentucky (AHC/QB)
- 2018–2019: Washington State (WR)
- 2020–2022: Mississippi State (outside WR)
- 2023: Tulsa (OC/QB)
- 2024: Tulsa (AHC/OC/RB)
- 2025–present: Florida (OA)

Steve Spurrier Jr. (born September 26, 1971) is an American football coach. He is an Offensive Analyst at Florida, a position he has held since 2025. He previously served as the wide receivers coach at Mississippi State University from 2020 to 2022.

Spurrier played college football at the Duke University as a wide receiver from 1989 to 1993. Prior to his tenure at Mississippi State, he held various assistant coaching positions at Washington State University, Western Kentucky University, the University of Oklahoma, the University of South Carolina, the University of Arizona, the Washington Redskins of the National Football League (NFL), and the University of Florida.

Spurrier's coaching career includes 22 postseason bowl games, including the Sugar Bowl, Fiesta Bowl, Cotton Bowl, and Orange Bowl. Spurrier was also part of five conference championships (three SEC; two Big 12) and two national championships (Oklahoma, 2000; Florida, 1996).

== Coaching career ==
=== Florida (1994–1998) ===
Spurrier served as a graduate assistant at the University of Florida from 1994 to 1996. In 1997, Spurrier took on the role of football video assistant. In 1998, Spurrier was elevated to special teams coach.

=== Oklahoma (1999–2001) ===
Prior to the 1999 season, Spurrier was hired as wide receivers coach by University of Oklahoma Head Coach, Bob Stoops. Spurrier stayed on Stoops’ staff, holding the same position, through the 2001 season.

=== Washington Redskins (2002–2003) ===
Spurrier was the wide receivers coach for the Washington Redskins in 2002 & 2003, where his father Steve Spurrier, served as Head Coach.

=== Arizona (2004) ===
In May 2004, Spurrier was hired as tight ends coach at the University of Arizona under head coach Mike Stoops.

=== South Carolina (2005–2015) ===
Spurrier Jr. joined his father's staff at the University of South Carolina in 2005. At different times in his 11 seasons at South Carolina, Spurrier served as wide receivers coach, passing game coordinator, recruiting coordinator, and co-offensive coordinator. Alshon Jeffery, Deebo Samuel, Pharoh Cooper, Sidney Rice, & Kenny McKinnley are amongst some of the receivers that Spurrier coached, who played in the NFL.

=== Oklahoma (2016) ===
In March 2016, University of Oklahoma Head Coach Bob Stoops, announced that Spurrier would be returning to Oklahoma as an offensive specialist & director of high school recruiting. Spurrier spent much of the 2016 season working closely with then Oklahoma offensive coordinator and current University of Southern California head coach, Lincoln Riley.

=== Western Kentucky (2017) ===
In December 2017, Spurrier was hired as assistant head coach/quarterbacks coach at Western Kentucky University under head coach Mike Sanford. As quarterback coach, Spurrier continued the development of Mike White, currently an NFL quarterback for the New York Jets.

=== Washington State (2018–2019) ===
In 2018, Spurrier was hired as the wide receivers coach at Washington State University under head coach Mike Leach.

Spurrier played a part quarterback Gardner Minshew's record-setting season in 2018. Minshew season as the Pac-12 Conference single-season passing leader for yards and completions.

=== Mississippi State (2020–2022) ===
On February 4, 2020, Spurrier was hired as the wide receivers coach and passing game coordinator at Mississippi State University following head coach Mike Leach.

On December 21, 2022, Mississippi State Head Coach Zach Arnett, announced that Spurrier would call the offensive plays vs. the University of Illinois in the RelaQuest Bowl.

Spurrier took over offensive play calling duties and helped Mississippi State defeat the University of Illinois, 19–10 in the RelaQuest Bowl.

=== Tulsa (2023–2024) ===
On January 6, 2023, Brett McMurphy of ESPN reported that Spurrier had been hired as the offensive coordinator and quarterbacks coach at the University of Tulsa. In 2024, he added the role of associate head coach and transitioned from quarterbacks coach to running backs coach.

=== Florida (since 2025) ===
On February 26, 2025, it was reported that Spurrier had been hired as an offensive analyst for the Florida Gators.

== Personal life ==
Spurrier and wife Melissa, have been married 26 years (July 19, 1997), and are the parents of triplets, Luke, Gavin, and Emmaline; Nolan; twins, Palmer and Hayden; and McKinley.

Two of Spurrier's sons, Gavin and Luke, attended their father's alma mater, Duke University. Gavin was a former walk-on quarterback for the football team, while brother Luke ran cross country.

Spurrier's father, is two-time College Football Hall of Famer, Steve Spurrier.
