= Jason Washington =

American football player and coach (born 1979)

Current position
- Title: Co-defensive coordinator & cornerbacks coach
- Team: South Alabama
- Conference: Sun Belt

Biographical details
- Born: September 16, 1979 (age 47)
- Education: Texas State University (2002, 2004)

Playing career

Football
- 1998–2001: Texas State

Baseball
- 1999–2002: Texas State
- Positions: Defensive back, Center fielder

Coaching career (HC unless noted)
- 2004–2006: Texas State (CB)
- 2007–2010: Rice (CB)
- 2011–2013: Texas State (CB)
- 2014: Texas State (secondary)
- 2015–2016: Houston (STC/CB)
- 2017–2019: Texas (RC/CB)
- 2020–2021: Mississippi State (S)
- 2022: Mississippi State (RB)
- 2025–present: South Alabama (Co-DC/CB)

Administrative career (AD unless noted)
- 2023–2024: Mississippi State (DPD)

Jason Washington (born September 16, 1979) is an American college football coach and former player. He is the co-defensive coordinator and cornerbacks coach for the University of South Alabama, positions he has held since 2025.

== High school career ==
Washington attended Douglas MacArthur High School in San Antonio, Texas where he was a three-year letterman as a quarterback, wide receiver and defensive back.

== Playing career ==
Washington was a four-year letterman at Texas State for both the football and baseball teams. He started as a defensive back for football and played as a center fielder for the baseball team before graduating in 2002. San Antonio area sportswriters named him the Defensive MVP in the area and was listed among the Top 100 players in Texas.

== Coaching career ==
=== Texas State ===
Washington started his coaching career at his alma mater, Texas State as the cornerbacks coach from 2004 to 2006.

=== Rice ===
In 2007, Washington was hired as the cornerbacks coach at Rice. He would coach five All-Conference USA defensive backs and one member of the 2009 C-USA All-Freshman team.

=== Texas State (second stint) ===
Washington rejoined the Bobcats as the cornerbacks coach on February 5, 2011.

In 2014, Washington was named a secondary coach.

=== Houston ===
In 2015, Washington was hired as the special teams coordinator and cornerbacks coach at Houston.

=== Texas ===
On November 27, 2016, Washington was named the recruiting coordinator and cornerbacks coach at Texas, joining Tom Herman's new coaching staff.

On January 10, 2020, it was announced that Texas would not retain Washington.

=== Mississippi State ===
On February 1, 2020, Washington was hired as the safeties coach for Mississippi State.

In 2022, Washington was promoted as the running backs coach.

In January 2023, Washington was named the director of player development.

On December 5, 2023, Washington was named as the Director of Life Skills and NFL Liaison by coach Jeff Lebby.

=== South Alabama ===
On January 15, 2025, Washington was hired as the co-defensive coordinator and cornerbacks coach at South Alabama.

== Personal life ==
Washington proposed to his girlfriend, Mary Cameron "MC" Yeomans, on January 2, 2023, after winning the 2023 ReliaQuest Bowl which honored late coach Mike Leach's influence on the couple. They would marry on July 8, 2023.
