= Marc Woodard =

American football player (born 1970)

No. 57
- Position: Linebacker

Personal information
- Born: February 21, 1970 (age 56); Kosciusko, Mississippi, U.S.
- Listed height: 6 ft 0 in (1.83 m)
- Listed weight: 238 lb (108 kg)

Career information
- High school: Kosciusko (Mississippi)
- College: Mississippi State
- NFL draft: 1993: 5th round, 140th overall pick

Career history
- Pittsburgh Steelers (1993)*; Philadelphia Eagles (1993–1996)
- * Offseason or practice squad member only

Career NFL statistics
- Tackles: 34
- Sacks: 1.5
- Fumble recoveries: 1
- Stats at Pro Football Reference

Marc Fionn Woodard (born February 21, 1970) is an American former professional football player who was a linebacker for three seasons with the Philadelphia Eagles of the National Football League (NFL). He was selected by the Pittsburgh Steelers in the fifth round of the 1993 NFL draft after playing college football for the Mississippi State Bulldogs.

== Early life and college ==
Marc Fionn Woodard was born on February 21, 1970, in Kosciusko, Mississippi. He attended Kosciusko High School in Kosciusko.

Woodard played college football for the Bulldogs of Mississippi State University. He recorded three interceptions in 1989.

== Professional career ==
Woodard was selected by the Pittsburgh Steelers in the fifth round, with the 140th overall pick, of the 1993 NFL draft. He officially signed with the team on July 26. He was released on August 30, 1993.

Woodard was signed to the practice squad of the Philadelphia Eagles on October 1, 1993. He became a free agent after the season and re-signed with the team, on April 6, 1994. He played in all 16 games for the Eagles in 1994 and posted 27 special teams tackles. Woodard appeared in all 16 games for the second consecutive season in 1995, totaling 12 solo tackles on defense, two assisted tackles, and 1.5 sacks. He also played in two playoff games that year, recording six solo tackles on defense. He played in all 16 games for the third straight season, starting two, in 1996, totaling 16 solo tackles on defense, four assisted tackles, and one fumble recovery. Woodard also started one postseason game for the Eagles in 1996, recording five solo tackles and one assisted tackle. He became a free after the 1996 season.
