= Ford Typewriter =

Type of typewriter

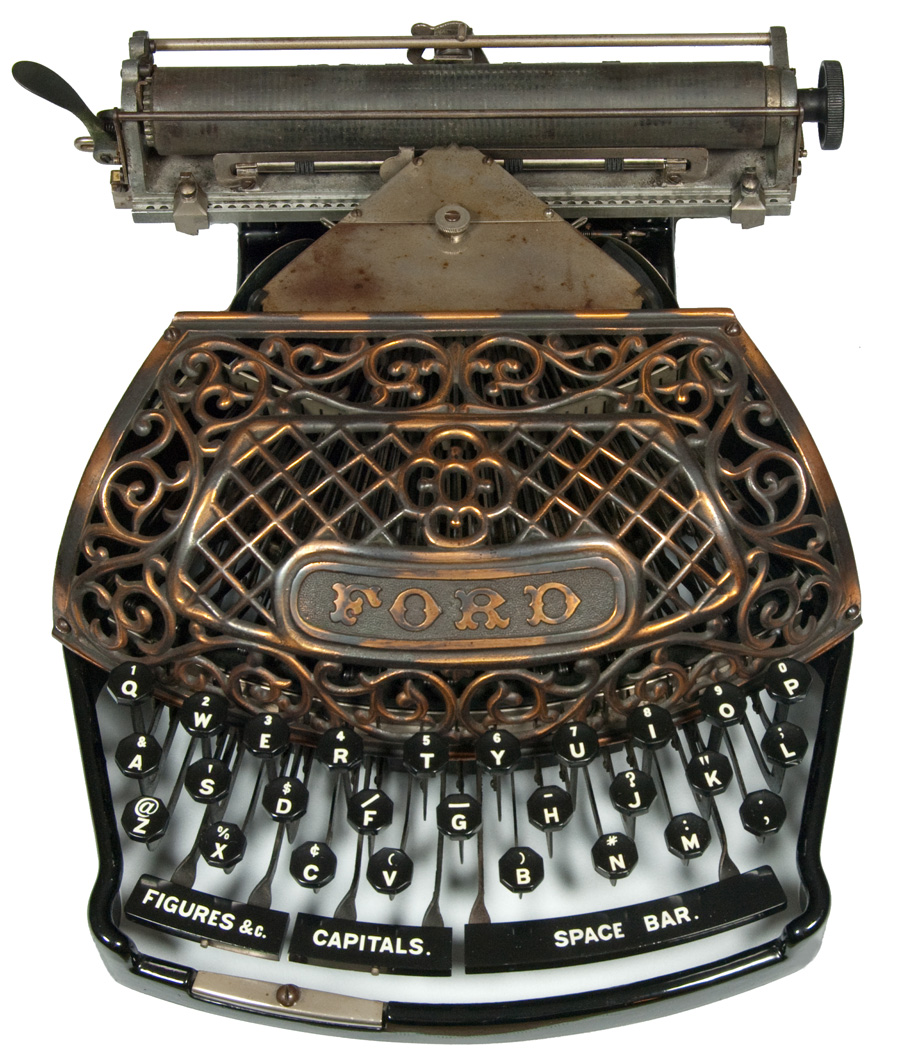
Ford typewriter, 1895

The Ford Typewriter was introduced in 1895 by Eugene A. Ford, who later became the chief development engineer at IBM (no relation to Henry Ford, who founded the Ford Motor Company). The Ford Typewriter is notable for its forward-striking mechanism and innovative use of aluminum in its construction.

== Design and Features ==
Unlike many competing typewriters of its time, the Ford Typewriter was a forward-striking machine. This means the type-bars moved forward against the paper, which was held against the platen. This design allowed the typist to see the text as it was being typed, a feature not commonly available in other typewriters of that era.

The Ford Typewriter was the first to use aluminum in its construction, making it lighter and more portable compared to other typewriters made primarily of iron or steel. This innovative use of aluminum was a significant advancement in typewriter design, showcasing the potential for new materials in manufacturing processes.

== Production and Market Impact ==
Despite its innovative features, the Ford Typewriter was produced in limited numbers and did not achieve widespread commercial success. The limited production run may have been due to the higher costs associated with using aluminum and the relatively new forward-striking mechanism. However, the machine gained recognition in the collector's market, where it is sought after for its unique design and historical significance. Collectors and historians value the Ford Typewriter as a symbol of early technological innovation and its influence on later typewriter designs.

== Legacy ==
The Ford Typewriter represents an important step in the evolution of typewriters, particularly with its forward-striking mechanism and use of lightweight materials. While it did not become a mainstream product, its design principles influenced the development of later typewriters, contributing to the eventual standardization of visible typing.

Today, surviving Ford Typewriters are rare and considered valuable collector's items. They are often featured in museum exhibits on the history of technology and are prized by typewriter enthusiasts for their contribution to the development of office equipment.
