= Kosciusko School District =

Public school district in Mississippi, United States

Kosciusko Senior High School

Location
- 415 Veterans Memorial Drive; Kosciusko, (Attala County), Mississippi 39090; United States
- Coordinates: 33.053502°N 89.568383°W

Information
- Type: Public high school
- Principal: Henry Coats
- Staff: 39.60 (FTE)
- Enrollment: 588 (2023-24)
- Student to teacher ratio: 14.85
- Colors: Maroon and white
- Nickname: Whippets
- Website: Kosciusko Senior High School

The Kosciusko School District is a public school district based in Kosciusko, Mississippi.

== Schools ==
- Kosciusko Senior High School (Grades 9–12). Football player Marc Woodard went on to Mississippi State University and became a player on the Philadelphia Eagles team. Whippets are the school mascot. Maroon and white are the school colors.
- Kosciusko Junior High School (Grades 6–8)
- Kosciusko Upper Elementary School (Grades 4–5)
- Kosciusko Middle Elementary School (Grades 2–3)
- Kosciusko Lower Elementary School (Grades K-1)
- Kosciusko PreSchool School (Grades Preschool)

== Demographics ==
=== 2006-07 school year ===
There were a total of 2,169 students enrolled in the Kosciusko School District during the 2006–2007 school year. The gender makeup of the district was 48% female and 52% male. The racial makeup of the district was 47.26% African American, 50.62% White, 1.57% Hispanic, 0.51% Asian, and 0.05% Native American. 50.9% of the district's students were eligible to receive free lunch.

=== Previous school years ===
School Year	Enrollment	Gender Makeup		Racial Makeup				
School Year	Enrollment	Female	Male	Asian	African American	Hispanic	Native American	White
2005-06	2,120	48%	52%	0.52%	49.39%	1.42%	0.09%	48.58%
2004-05	2,091	47%	53%	0.48%	47.58%	1.00%	0.05%	50.88%
2003-04	2,085	48%	52%	0.38%	49.35%	0.82%	0.05%	49.40%
2002-03	2,089	48%	52%	0.38%	48.59%	1.10%	0.05%	49.88%

== Accountability statistics ==
	2006-07	2005-06	2004-05	2003-04	2002-03
District Accreditation Status	Accredited	Accredited	Accredited	Accredited	Accredited
School Performance Classifications
Level 5 (Superior Performing) Schools	3	4	4	3	3
Level 4 (Exemplary) Schools	1	0	0	1	1
Level 3 (Successful) Schools	0	0	0	0	0
Level 2 (Under Performing) Schools	0	0	0	0	0
Level 1 (Low Performing) Schools	0	0	0	0	0
Not Assigned	1	1	1	1	1

== See also ==
- List of school districts in Mississippi
