= Jamie Sheriff =

American football player (born 2000)

No. 50 – Seattle Seahawks
- Position: Outside linebacker
- Roster status: Practice squad

Personal information
- Born: August 18, 2000 (age 26); Jackson, Mississippi, U.S.
- Listed height: 6 ft 1 in (1.85 m)
- Listed weight: 254 lb (115 kg)

Career information
- High school: Terry (Terry, Mississippi)
- College: Mississippi Gulf Coast CC (2018–2019); South Alabama (2020–2023)
- NFL draft: 2024: undrafted

Career history
- Seattle Seahawks (2024)*; Carolina Panthers (2024); Seattle Seahawks (2024–2025); Los Angeles Rams (2026)*; Seattle Seahawks (2026–present)*
- * Offseason or practice squad member only

Awards and highlights
- Super Bowl champion (LX)

Career NFL statistics as of 2025
- Tackles: 1
- Stats at Pro Football Reference

Jamie Lee Sheriff II (born August 18, 2000) is an American professional football outside linebacker for the Seattle Seahawks of the National Football League (NFL). He played college football for the Mississippi Gulf Coast Bulldogs and South Alabama Jaguars and was signed by the Seattle Seahawks as an undrafted free agent in 2024.

== Early life ==
Sheriff was born on August 18, 2000, in Jackson, Mississippi. He grew up in Terry, Mississippi, a small town with a population of about 1,300. He attended Terry High School and played for the football team, recording 60 tackles, seven tackles-for-loss (TFLs), five sacks and three safeties as a senior. He received little attention as a recruit and walk-on to play college football for the Mississippi Gulf Coast Bulldogs, a junior college team.

== College career ==
Sheriff recorded 26 tackles and six sacks as a freshman at Mississippi Gulf Coast in 2018. In 2019, he helped the school compile an undefeated 12–0 record while winning the national championship. He made 50 stops, 12 TFLs and eight sacks, being named second-team All-Mississippi Association of Community and Junior Colleges (MACJC) while being ranked a three-star junior college prospect and a top 25 strongside defensive end nationally.

Sheriff transferred to the South Alabama Jaguars for the rest of his collegiate career. In his first season with the Jaguars, 2020, he appeared in all 11 games, six as a starter, and recorded 21 tackles and a sack. He missed the entire 2021 season due to injury. He returned in 2022 and appeared in 13 games, posting 34 tackles, 7.5 TFLs and six sacks. Using an extra year of eligibility granted to all players due to the COVID-19 pandemic, Sheriff opted to return for a final season in 2023. In his last season, Sheriff totaled 45 tackles, 8.5 TFLs and three sacks; he was named the Defensive MVP in his final game, as he helped South Alabama to a win in the 2023 68 Ventures Bowl, the program's first-ever bowl game win.

== Professional career ==
Pre-draft measurables
Height	Weight	Arm length	Hand span	Wingspan	40-yard dash	10-yard split	20-yard split	20-yard shuttle	Three-cone drill	Vertical jump	Broad jump	Bench press
6 ft 1 3/8 in (1.86 m)	254 lb (115 kg)	31 1/4 in (0.79 m)	9 1/2 in (0.24 m)	6 ft 3 3/4 in (1.92 m)	4.73 s	1.63 s	2.70 s	4.49 s	7.19 s	33 in (0.84 m)	9 ft 10 in (3.00 m)	27 reps
All values from Pro Day

=== Seattle Seahawks (first stint) ===
After going unselected in the 2024 NFL draft, Sheriff attended the rookie minicamp of the Seattle Seahawks, but was not signed. While a free agent, he worked as a beer deliveryman in Ridgeland, Mississippi. He quit his job on August 4, and on August 6, he signed with the Seahawks as an undrafted free agent. Although signed late into the offseason, Sheriff was a standout in preseason, recording eight tackles, three sacks and five quarterback hits in three preseason games. He was waived on August 27.

=== Carolina Panthers ===
On August 28, 2024, one day after being waived by the Seahawks, Sheriff was claimed off waivers by the Carolina Panthers. Sheriff played 17 snaps in the Panthers' 47-10 Week 1 loss to the New Orleans Saints. He was waived to clear roster space for veteran pass rusher Charles Harris on September 10.

=== Seattle Seahawks (second stint) ===
On September 13, 2024, Sheriff was signed to the Seattle Seahawks' practice squad. He signed a reserve/future contract with Seattle on January 6, 2025.

On August 26, 2025, Sheriff was waived by the Seahawks as part of final roster cuts, and was re-signed to the practice squad the following day On February 12, 2026, he signed a reserve/futures contract with the Seahawks. On August 30, Sheriff was waived by Seattle as a part of final roster cuts.

=== Los Angeles Rams ===
On September 3, 2026, Sheriff was signed to the Los Angeles Rams' practice squad. On October 14, he was released.

=== Seattle Seahawks (third stint) ===
On November 4, 2026, Sheriff signed with the Seattle Seahawks' practice squad.
