= Kosciusko, Mississippi =

- City
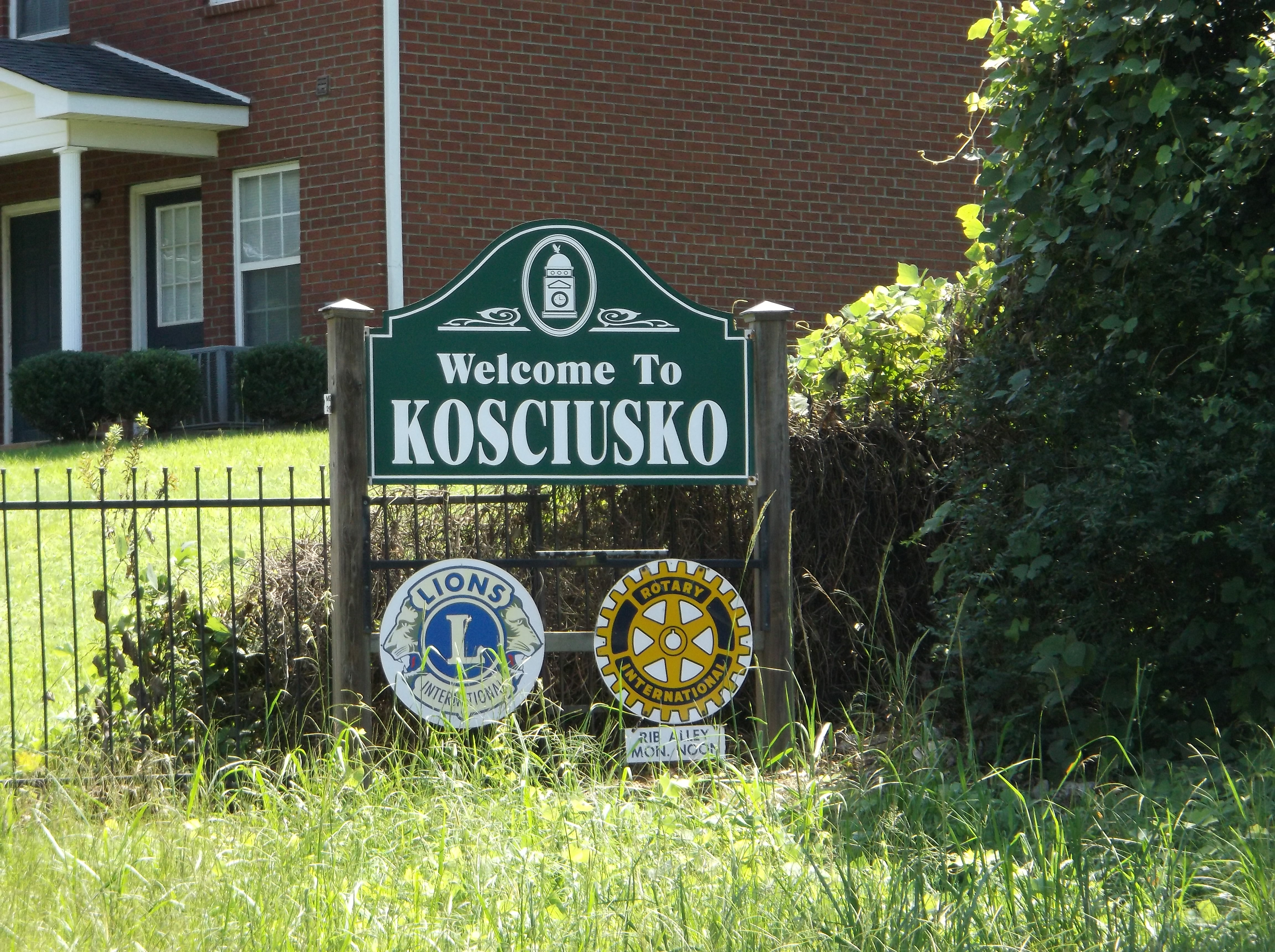
- Welcome sign located on Mississippi Highway 12

- Flag Logo

- Location of Kosciusko, Mississippi
- Coordinates: 33°3′29″N 89°35′18″W
- Country: United States
- State: Mississippi
- County: Attala
- Named for: Tadeusz Kościuszko

Government
  - Mayor: Tim Kyle (I)

Area
  - Total: 7.55 sq mi (19.56 km^{2})
  - Land: 7.54 sq mi (19.53 km^{2})
  - Water: 0.0077 sq mi (0.02 km^{2})
- Elevation: 479 ft (146 m)

Population (2020)
  - Total: 7,114
  - Density: 943.3/sq mi (364.22/km^{2})
- Time zone: UTC-6 (Central (CST))
  - Summer (DST): UTC-5 (CDT)
- ZIP code: 39090
- Area code: 662
- FIPS code: 28-38320
- GNIS feature ID: 0672213
- Website: kosciusko.ms

Kosciusko (/ˌkɒziˈɛskoʊ/ KOZ-ee-ESK-oh) is a city in and the county seat of Attala County, Mississippi, United States. As of the 2020 census, Kosciusko had a population of 7,114.

== History ==
Shortly before the War of 1812, David Choate, a French trader along with his wife, a Choctaw, opened the Choate Stand, an inn along the Natchez Trace. They chose a location near the intersection of the trace and a cross path that led to the Creek Indian Nation, where there was a natural spring to provide fresh water, at the approximate location of the current town square. Journals from the war of 1812 indicate that Andrew Jackson received supplies at Choate Stand. In 1850, the Choate family was forcibly removed to Indian Territory in Oklahoma by the Indian Removal Act, signed by Andrew Jackson. In 2017 Kosciusko inaugurated an annual Return to Redbud Springs Festival to honor this history.

The settlement was at one time named Red Bud Springs for a natural spring that was present in the city. Later, Redbud Springs was renamed Kosciusko, for General Tadeusz Kościuszko, a Polish officer who served with the Continental Army and assisted its military efforts during the American Revolution. His name has been anglicized as 'Kosciusko'.

Throughout the 19th century, cotton was the predominant crop, and remains important in the area.

In 1893, Central Mississippi College opened in Kosciusko; it was a private segregated school for African American students established by the local Baptist associations. Kosciusko was the location of Magnolia Bible College from 1976 to 2008.

== Geography ==
Kosciusko is located along the Yockanookany River, 62 mi (100 km) northeast of Jackson.

According to the United States Census Bureau, the city has a total area of 7.6 square miles (20 km^{2}), of which 7.5 square miles (19 km^{2}) is land and 0.13% is water.

=== Climate ===
The climate is characterized by hot, humid summers and generally mild to cool winters. According to the Köppen Climate Classification system, Kosciusko has a humid subtropical climate, abbreviated "Cfa" on climate maps.

Climate data for Kosciusko, Mississippi (1991–2020 normals, extremes 1893–2020)
Month	Jan	Feb	Mar	Apr	May	Jun	Jul	Aug	Sep	Oct	Nov	Dec	Year
Record high °F (°C)	85 (29)	85 (29)	92 (33)	98 (37)	102 (39)	109 (43)	108 (42)	109 (43)	109 (43)	98 (37)	89 (32)	84 (29)	109 (43)
Mean maximum °F (°C)	72.7 (22.6)	75.7 (24.3)	82.7 (28.2)	85.9 (29.9)	90.6 (32.6)	94.4 (34.7)	96.7 (35.9)	97.1 (36.2)	94.0 (34.4)	87.4 (30.8)	79.4 (26.3)	73.9 (23.3)	98.2 (36.8)
Mean daily maximum °F (°C)	54.3 (12.4)	58.8 (14.9)	66.8 (19.3)	74.3 (23.5)	81.2 (27.3)	87.5 (30.8)	90.0 (32.2)	89.9 (32.2)	85.3 (29.6)	74.5 (23.6)	63.8 (17.7)	56.1 (13.4)	73.5 (23.1)
Daily mean °F (°C)	43.7 (6.5)	47.3 (8.5)	54.8 (12.7)	62.6 (17.0)	70.7 (21.5)	77.7 (25.4)	80.5 (26.9)	80.0 (26.7)	74.4 (23.6)	63.2 (17.3)	52.5 (11.4)	46.0 (7.8)	62.8 (17.1)
Mean daily minimum °F (°C)	33.0 (0.6)	35.9 (2.2)	42.8 (6.0)	50.9 (10.5)	60.1 (15.6)	67.8 (19.9)	70.9 (21.6)	70.0 (21.1)	63.6 (17.6)	51.8 (11.0)	41.1 (5.1)	35.8 (2.1)	52.0 (11.1)
Mean minimum °F (°C)	16.6 (−8.6)	22.3 (−5.4)	26.3 (−3.2)	35.2 (1.8)	45.8 (7.7)	57.7 (14.3)	63.8 (17.7)	62.6 (17.0)	50.4 (10.2)	35.4 (1.9)	26.2 (−3.2)	22.0 (−5.6)	14.7 (−9.6)
Record low °F (°C)	−14 (−26)	−9 (−23)	10 (−12)	24 (−4)	36 (2)	41 (5)	53 (12)	50 (10)	37 (3)	20 (−7)	12 (−11)	0 (−18)	−14 (−26)
Average precipitation inches (mm)	5.79 (147)	5.97 (152)	5.88 (149)	6.75 (171)	4.83 (123)	4.17 (106)	5.85 (149)	3.74 (95)	4.45 (113)	4.49 (114)	4.76 (121)	5.84 (148)	62.52 (1,588)
Average snowfall inches (cm)	0.6 (1.5)	0.2 (0.51)	0.0 (0.0)	0.0 (0.0)	0.0 (0.0)	0.0 (0.0)	0.0 (0.0)	0.0 (0.0)	0.0 (0.0)	0.0 (0.0)	0.0 (0.0)	0.5 (1.3)	1.3 (3.31)
Average precipitation days (≥ 0.01 in)	8.7	8.8	9.4	7.1	8.5	8.5	9.7	7.6	5.7	6.0	6.7	9.2	95.9
Average snowy days (≥ 0.1 in)	0.3	0.3	0.0	0.0	0.0	0.0	0.0	0.0	0.0	0.0	0.0	0.2	0.8
Source: NOAA

== Demographics ==
Historical population
Census	Pop.	Note	%±
1890	1,394		—
1900	2,078		49.1%
1910	2,385		14.8%
1920	2,258		−5.3%
1930	3,237		43.4%
1940	4,291		32.6%
1950	6,753		57.4%
1960	6,800		0.7%
1970	7,266		6.9%
1980	7,415		2.1%
1990	6,986		−5.8%
2000	7,372		5.5%
2010	7,402		0.4%
2020	7,114		−3.9%
U.S. Decennial Census

=== 2020 census ===
As of the 2020 census, Kosciusko had a population of 7,114. The median age was 36.0 years. 28.9% of residents were under the age of 18 and 18.6% of residents were 65 years of age or older. For every 100 females there were 84.4 males, and for every 100 females age 18 and over there were 80.1 males age 18 and over.

93.5% of residents lived in urban areas, while 6.5% lived in rural areas.

There were 2,653 households in Kosciusko, and there were 1,720 families. Of all households, 38.0% had children under the age of 18 living in them. Of all households, 33.4% were married-couple households, 16.4% were households with a male householder and no spouse or partner present, and 44.4% were households with a female householder and no spouse or partner present. About 28.2% of all households were made up of individuals and 13.5% had someone living alone who was 65 years of age or older.

There were 3,056 housing units, of which 13.2% were vacant. The homeowner vacancy rate was 2.0% and the rental vacancy rate was 7.2%.

Racial composition as of the 2020 census
Race	Number	Percent
White	2,683	37.7%
Black or African American	4,027	56.6%
American Indian and Alaska Native	14	0.2%
Asian	50	0.7%
Native Hawaiian and Other Pacific Islander	1	0.0%
Some other race	157	2.2%
Two or more races	182	2.6%
Hispanic or Latino (of any race)	198	2.8%

=== 2000 census ===
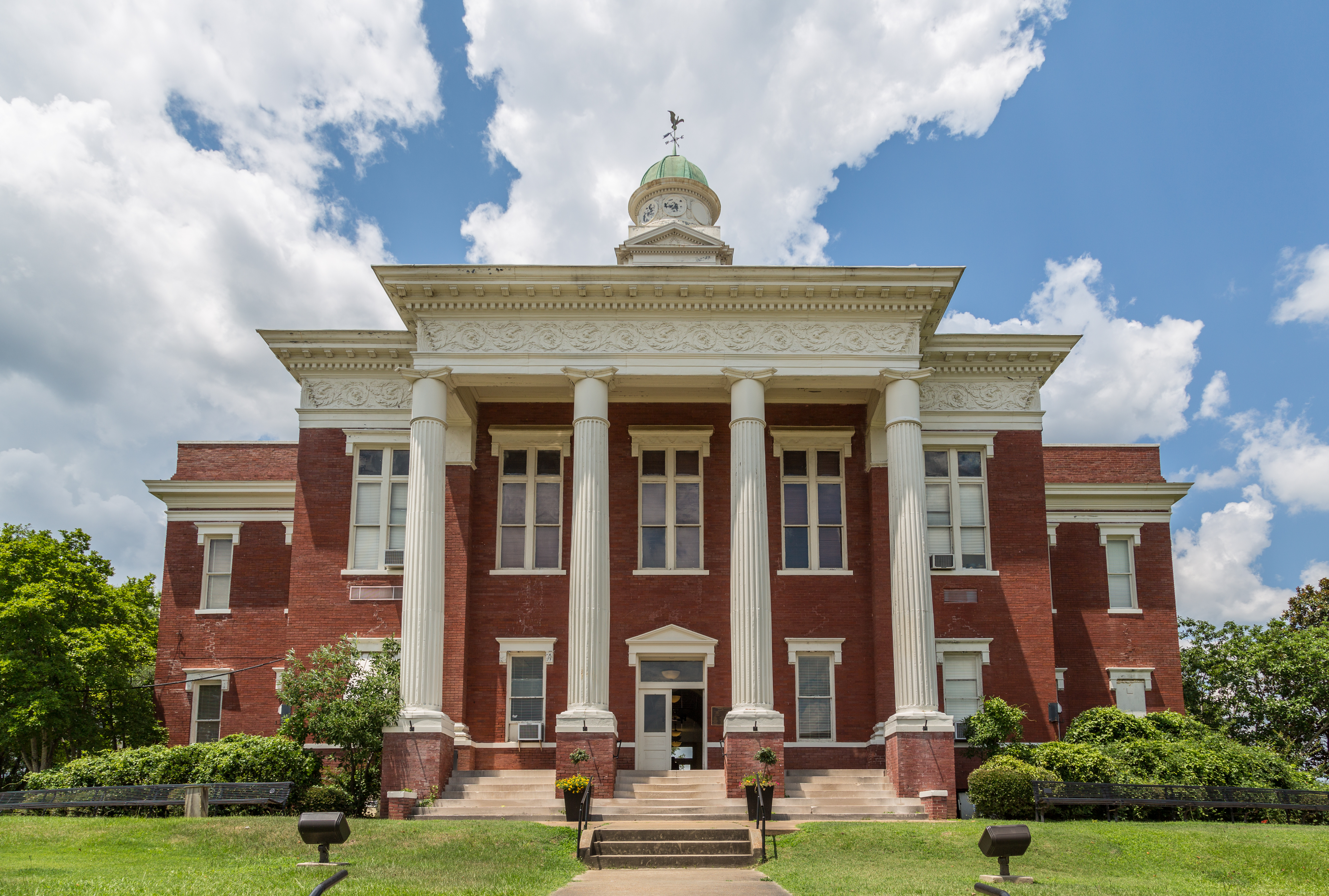
Attala County Courthouse

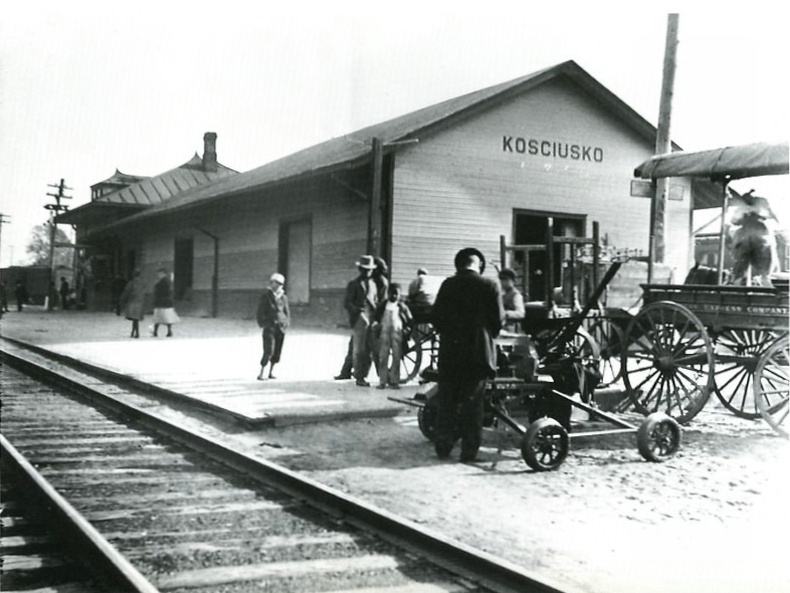
Illinois Central Depot in Kosciusko, 1920

As of the census of 2000, there were 7,372 people, 2,885 households, and 1,906 families residing in the city. The population density was 977.8 inhabitants per square mile (377.5/km^{2}). There were 3,174 housing units at an average density of 421.0 per square mile (162.5/km^{2}). The racial makeup of the city was 53.66% White, 44.57% African American, 0.16% Native American, 0.46% Asian, 0.60% from other races, and 0.54% from two or more races. Hispanic or Latino of any race were 1.06% of the population.

There were 2,885 households, out of which 31.7% had children under the age of 18 living with them, 40.2% were married couples living together, 21.9% had a female householder with no husband present, and 33.9% were non-families. 31.2% of all households were made up of individuals, and 17.5% had someone living alone who was 65 years of age or older. The average household size was 2.43 and the average family size was 3.04.

In the city, the population was spread out, with 26.2% under the age of 18, 9.5% from 18 to 24, 23.9% from 25 to 44, 19.8% from 45 to 64, and 20.6% who were 65 years of age or older. The median age was 37 years. For every 100 females, there were 82.7 males. For every 100 females age 18 and over, there were 77.1 males.

The median income for a household in the city was $21,737, and the median income for a family was $29,000. Males had a median income of $27,423 versus $16,487 for females. The per capita income for the city was $13,478. About 20.9% of families and 24.2% of the population were below the poverty line, including 31.9% of those under age 18 and 20.1% of those age 65 or over.

== Government ==
In 2025, incumbent mayor Tim Kyle, a Democrat-turned-Independent, was reelected Mayor of Kosciusko after defeating Democrat Marvin Myles Jr. He has served as Mayor since July 1, 2021.

== Arts and culture ==
Kosciusko has hosted the Central Mississippi Fair for over 100 years.

Kosciusko has been featured as part of the Mississippi Blues Trail since 2009.

Kosciusko is home to the Skipworth Performing Arts Center.

Kosciusko is home to The Guitar Academy.

== Education ==
The city of Kosciusko is served by the Kosciusko School District and includes Kosciusko Senior High School.

== Notable people ==
- Dave Barnes, singer-songwriter and musician for Razor & Tie
- Billy Ray Bates, professional basketball player
- Sheri Biggs, U.S. representative for South Carolina
- Eva Webb Dodd, Anna Boyd Ellington, and Mary Comfort Leonard, founders of the Delta Gamma fraternity
- Eugene A. Ford, First Chief Engineer for IBM was born and raised here.
- Clarence Harmon, former NFL running back for the Washington Redskins
- James Meredith, civil rights figure
- William Hughes Miller, Professor Emeritus of Chemistry at UC Berkeley
- Charlie Musselwhite, blues harmonica player and band leader
- Jason Niles, lawyer, newspaper editor, and politician
- Topher Payne, playwright
- Blanche Colton Williams, author, editor, department head and professor of English literature, and pioneer in women's higher education
- Oprah Winfrey, entertainer and entrepreneur
- Marc Woodard, former NFL linebacker for the Philadelphia Eagles
