= Zach Arnett =

American football coach (born 1986)

Current position
- Title: Defensive Coordinator
- Team: Mississippi State

Biographical details
- Born: September 10, 1986 (age 40); Albuquerque, New Mexico, U.S.

Playing career
- 2005–2008: New Mexico
- Position: Linebacker

Coaching career (HC unless noted)
- 2011–2013: San Diego State (GA)
- 2014–2017: San Diego State (LB)
- 2018–2019: San Diego State (DC/LB)
- 2020: Mississippi State (DC/LB)
- 2021–2022: Mississippi State (DC/S)
- 2023: Mississippi State
- 2024: Ole Miss (analyst)
- 2025: Florida State (analyst)
- 2026–present: Mississippi State (DC)

Head coaching record
- Overall: 5–6
- Bowls: 1–0

Zachary Arnett (born September 10, 1986) is an American football coach who is the defensive coordinator at Mississippi State. He served as the head coach at Mississippi State in 2023 and previous stint as the defensive coordinator at Mississippi State from 2020 to 2022. He also briefly served as the defensive coordinator at the University of Nevada, Las Vegas (UNLV) from December 2024 until his resignation in April 2025.

Arnett played college football at the University of New Mexico as a linebacker from 2005 to 2008. Prior to his tenure at Mississippi State, he held various assistant coaching positions at San Diego State University from 2011 to 2019.

== Playing career ==
Arnett attended La Cueva High School in Albuquerque, New Mexico and was a two-sport athlete in football and baseball. He originally accepted an offer to play for the New Mexico Lobos baseball team, but he earned a scholarship to the football team in the summer of 2005. He excelled on the field and in the classroom during his college career, earning six forced fumbles and was a first-team Academic All-American in 2008.

== Coaching career ==
=== San Diego State ===
After being away from football for two years, he became a graduate assistant at San Diego State under his New Mexico head coach Rocky Long. Within three years, he was promoted to linebackers coach. His linebacker unit produced five different All-Mountain West selections, including 3-time All-Mountain West selection Calvin Munson. In 2018, he was promoted again, this time to defensive coordinator. Under him, San Diego State ranked 32nd in total defense in 2018 and 2nd in 2019, which was a 30-place gain from the year before.

=== Mississippi State ===
On January 11, 2020, Arnett was named the new defensive coordinator at Syracuse. However, the stint with Syracuse was short-lived, as he was hired as the defensive coordinator and linebackers coach by Mississippi State on January 22, 2020.

Arnett was named interim head coach at Mississippi State after Mike Leach was hospitalized on December 11, 2022. After Leach's death, Mississippi State removed the interim tag from Arnett's title and named him the 35th full-time head coach in school history on December 15, 2022. Mississippi State fired Arnett on November 13, 2023, with two games left in the regular season.

=== Ole Miss ===
In 2024, Arnett joined the University of Mississippi (Ole Miss) as an analyst under head coach Lane Kiffin.

=== UNLV ===
On December 30, 2024, Arnett was hired as the defensive coordinator and linebackers coach at the University of Nevada, Las Vegas (UNLV) under head coach Dan Mullen. However, he resigned for personal reasons on April 7, 2025.

== Personal life ==
Arnett is married with two children.

== Head coaching record ==
=== College ===
Year	Team	Overall	Conference	Standing	Bowl/playoffs	Coaches^{#}	AP^{°}
Mississippi State Bulldogs (Southeastern Conference) (2022–2023)
2022	Mississippi State	1–0	0–0		W ReliaQuest (Note: Arnett coached the Bulldogs in the ReliaQuest Bowl following the death of head coach Mike Leach on December 12, 2022.)	19	20
2023	Mississippi State	4–6 (Note: Mississippi State fired Arnett with two games remaining.)	1–6				
Mississippi State:		5–6	1–6				
Total:		5–6					
