= Marcus Banks (American football) =

American football player (born 2000)

Profile
- Position: Safety

Personal information
- Born: October 8, 2000 (age 26); Houston, Texas, U.S.
- Listed height: 6 ft 0 in (1.83 m)
- Listed weight: 190 lb (86 kg)

Career information
- High school: Dekaney (Harris County, Texas)
- College: Alabama (2019–2021); Mississippi State (2022–2023)
- NFL draft: 2024: undrafted

Career history
- Tampa Bay Buccaneers (2024–2025)

Awards and highlights
- CFP national champion (2020)

Career NFL statistics as of 2025
- Games played: 3
- Stats at Pro Football Reference

Marcus Banks (born October 8, 2000) is an American professional football safety. He played college football for the Alabama Crimson Tide and Mississippi State Bulldogs.

== Early life ==
Banks attended Dekaney High School located in Harris County, Texas. Coming out of high school, he initially committed to play college football for the LSU Tigers, but he would later decommit. Ultimately, Banks would commit to play for the Alabama Crimson Tide.

== College career ==
=== Alabama ===
During his three seasons at Alabama from 2019 through 2021, he recorded eight tackles and an interception against Mercer during the 2021 season. After the conclusion of the 2021 season, Banks decided to enter his name into the NCAA transfer portal.

=== Mississippi State ===
Banks transferred to play for the Mississippi State. During his two seasons at Mississippi State in 2023 and 2024, he played in 25 games, recording 65 tackles, five pass deflections, a fumble recovery, and a touchdown.

== Professional career ==
Pre-draft measurables
Height	Weight	Arm length	Hand span	Wingspan	40-yard dash	10-yard split	20-yard split	20-yard shuttle	Three-cone drill	Vertical jump	Broad jump	Bench press
6 ft 0 3/8 in (1.84 m)	190 lb (86 kg)	29 in (0.74 m)	9 in (0.23 m)	5 ft 11 7/8 in (1.83 m)	4.45 s	1.57 s	2.57 s	4.21 s	6.90 s	36.5 in (0.93 m)	10 ft 5 in (3.18 m)	17 reps
All values from Pro Day

After not being selected in the 2024 NFL draft, Banks signed with the Tampa Bay Buccaneers as an undrafted free agent. During final roster cuts before the start of the 2024 season, he was released but signed to the team's practice squad. After spending the entire 2024 season on the Buccaneers' practice squad, Banks re-signed with the team on a futures contract.

On July 31, 2025, Banks was released with an injury settlement. On November 18, he once again was re-signed to Tampa Bay's practice squad. Heading into the team's Week 12 matchup, Banks was elevated from the practice squad. On January 8, 2026, he signed a reserve/futures contract with the Buccaneers.

On August 20, 2026, Banks was waived by the Buccaneers with an injury settlement.
