= Nathan Pickering =

American football player (born 2000)

Profile
- Position: Defensive end

Personal information
- Born: November 18, 2000 (age 25); Mount Olive, Mississippi, U.S.
- Listed height: 6 ft 4 in (1.93 m)
- Listed weight: 314 lb (142 kg)

Career information
- High school: Seminary (Seminary, Mississippi)
- College: Mississippi State (2019–2023)
- NFL draft: 2024: undrafted

Career history
- Seattle Seahawks (2024)*; Saskatchewan Roughriders (2026)*
- * Offseason or practice squad member only
- Stats at Pro Football Reference

Nathan Immanuel Treshawn Pickering (born November 18, 2000) is an American professional football defensive end. He played college football at Mississippi State and was signed by the Seattle Seahawks as an undrafted free agent in 2024.

== College career ==
Pickering played college football at Mississippi State. He played 51 games, where he had 124 total tackles, one pass deflection and a fumble recovery.

== Professional career ==
Pre-draft measurables
Height	Weight	Arm length	Hand span	20-yard shuttle	Three-cone drill	Vertical jump	Broad jump	Bench press
6 ft 3 3/4 in (1.92 m)	314 lb (142 kg)	33 1/8 in (0.84 m)	10 1/8 in (0.26 m)	4.70 s	7.81 s	24.5 in (0.62 m)	8 ft 4 in (2.54 m)	18 reps
All values from Pro Day

=== Seattle Seahawks ===
After going undrafted in the 2024 NFL draft, on May 3, 2024, Pickering signed a three-year, $2.83 million contract with the Seattle Seahawks. He was waived with an injury designation on August 14.

=== Saskatchewan Roughriders ===
On May 4, 2026, Pickering signed with the Saskatchewan Roughriders of the Canadian Football League (CFL). He was released six days later.
