= Cameron Young (American football) =

American football player (born 2000)

Profile
- Position: Defensive tackle

Personal information
- Born: June 8, 2000 (age 26); Crosby, Mississippi, U.S.
- Listed height: 6 ft 3 in (1.91 m)
- Listed weight: 304 lb (138 kg)

Career information
- High school: Franklin County (Meadville, Mississippi)
- College: Mississippi State (2018–2022)
- NFL draft: 2023: 4th round, 123rd overall pick

Career history
- Seattle Seahawks (2023–2024); Green Bay Packers (2025)*
- * Offseason or practice squad member only

Career NFL statistics as of 2024
- Total tackles: 18
- Pass deflections: 1
- Stats at Pro Football Reference

Cameron Colette Young II (born June 8, 2000) is an American professional football defensive tackle. He played college football for the Mississippi State Bulldogs and was selected by the Seattle Seahawks in the fourth round of the 2023 NFL draft.

== Early life ==
Young grew up in Crosby, Mississippi and attended Franklin County High School. He initially planned on playing junior college football, but signed to play at Mississippi State after receiving a late offer from the school.

== College career ==
Young played in one game during his true freshman season before redshirting the year. He began seeing significant playing time as a redshirt junior and made 51 tackles with 2.5 tackles for loss, three pass deflections, and one interception. Young made 37 tackles with three tackles for loss and one sack during his redshirt senior season.

== Professional career ==
Pre-draft measurables
Height	Weight	Arm length	Hand span	40-yard dash	10-yard split	20-yard split	20-yard shuttle	Three-cone drill	Vertical jump	Broad jump
6 ft 3 3/8 in (1.91 m)	304 lb (138 kg)	34 1/2 in (0.88 m)	10 in (0.25 m)	5.10 s	1.80 s	2.94 s	4.82 s	7.97 s	28.5 in (0.72 m)	9 ft 0 in (2.74 m)
All values from NFL Combine/Pro Day

=== Seattle Seahawks ===
Young was selected by the Seattle Seahawks with the 123rd overall pick in the fourth round of the 2023 NFL draft.

On July 18, 2024, Young was placed on the active/physically unable to perform (PUP) list, and was placed on reserves to begin the season. He was activated on October 10, 2024. Young was waived by Seattle on April 23, 2025.

=== Green Bay Packers ===
On June 10, 2025, Young signed with the Green Bay Packers. He was released by Green Bay on July 18, 2025.

=== Birmingham Stallions ===
On January 14, 2026, Young was selected by the Birmingham Stallions of the United Football League (UFL).
