= Lideatrick Griffin =

American football player (born 2001)

Profile
- Position: Wide receiver

Personal information
- Born: January 23, 2001 (age 25)
- Listed height: 5 ft 10 in (1.78 m)
- Listed weight: 181 lb (82 kg)

Career information
- High school: Philadelphia (Philadelphia, Mississippi)
- College: Mississippi State (2020–2023)
- NFL draft: 2024: undrafted

Career history
- Las Vegas Raiders (2024)*; Cleveland Browns (2024)*; Green Bay Packers (2025)*; St. Louis Battlehawks (2026)*
- * Offseason or practice squad member only

Awards and highlights
- First-team All-American (2022); First-team All-SEC (2022)
- Stats at Pro Football Reference

Lideatrick "Tulu" Griffin (born January 23, 2001) is an American former professional football wide receiver. He played college football for the Mississippi State Bulldogs.

== Early life ==
Griffin attended Philadelphia High School in Philadelphia, Mississippi, where he played on both sides of the ball for the football team. On offense he caught 117 passes for 1,968 yards and 17 touchdowns, while also adding 1,035 yards and nine touchdowns on the ground, and one passing touchdown. On defense he totalled 38 tackles with two being for a loss, two pass deflections, and four interceptions. Griffin committed to play college football at Mississippi State over other schools such as Auburn, Tennessee, and Memphis.

== College career ==
In the 2020 Armed Forces Bowl against Tulsa, Griffin returned four kicks for 138 yards, including a 57-yard return on the opening kickoff, and caught two passes for 17 yards and the game-winning touchdown, earning game MVP honors. He finished the 2020 season with ten receptions for 61 yards and a touchdown, and seven kick returns for 261 yards. In week 2 of the 2021 season, Griffin returned the opening kickoff 100 yards for a touchdown in a win over NC State. He finished the 2021 season with 26 receptions for 269 yards and returned 15 kicks for 459 yards and a touchdown.

In week 4 of the 2022 season, Griffin caught a nine-yard touchdown reception in a win over Bowling Green. In week 10, he returned a kickoff 92 yards for a touchdown and hauled in a 57-yard reception in a 39–33 overtime win over Auburn, earning co-SEC special teams player of the week honors. In week 12, Griffin hauled in four receptions for 53 yards and two touchdowns in a 56–7 blowout of East Tennessee State 56–7. He finished the 2022 season with 42 receptions for 502 yards and four touchdowns, while also returning 19 kicks for 613 yards and a touchdown. Griffin was named first-team all-SEC as a returner and first-team All-American as a returner by FWAA.

Ahead of the 2023 season, Griffin was named preseason second-team all-SEC as an all-purpose back and third-team as a returner, as well as a preseason All-American. He was also named to the Paul Hornung Award watchlist.

== Professional career ==
Pre-draft measurables
Height	Weight	Arm length	Hand span	40-yard dash	10-yard split	20-yard split	20-yard shuttle	Three-cone drill	Vertical jump	Broad jump
5 ft 10 in (1.78 m)	181 lb (82 kg)	30 5/8 in (0.78 m)	9 1/8 in (0.23 m)	4.43 s	1.55 s	2.58 s	4.32 s	7.00 s	35.5 in (0.90 m)	10 ft 4 in (3.15 m)
All values from NFL Combine/Pro Day

=== Las Vegas Raiders ===
Griffin signed with the Las Vegas Raiders as an undrafted free agent on April 27, 2024. He was also selected by the San Antonio Brahmas in the sixth round of the 2024 UFL draft on July 17, 2024. He was waived on August 27, 2024.

=== Cleveland Browns ===
On August 29, 2024, Griffin was signed to the Cleveland Browns practice squad. He was released on September 10, 2024.

=== Green Bay Packers ===
On January 14, 2025, Griffin signed a reserve/futures contract with the Green Bay Packers. He was released by the Packers on May 5, 2025.

=== St. Louis Battlehawks ===
On January 14, 2026, Griffin was selected by the St. Louis Battlehawks of the United Football League (UFL). He retired on February 23.
