= Mississippi State Bulldogs football statistical leaders =

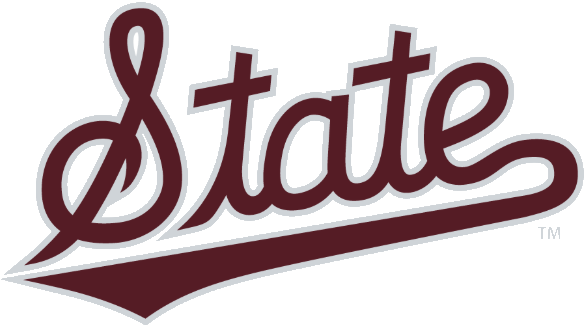

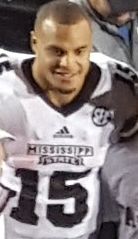
Dak Prescott held all of the Bulldogs' career, single-season, and single-game passing records when he graduated.

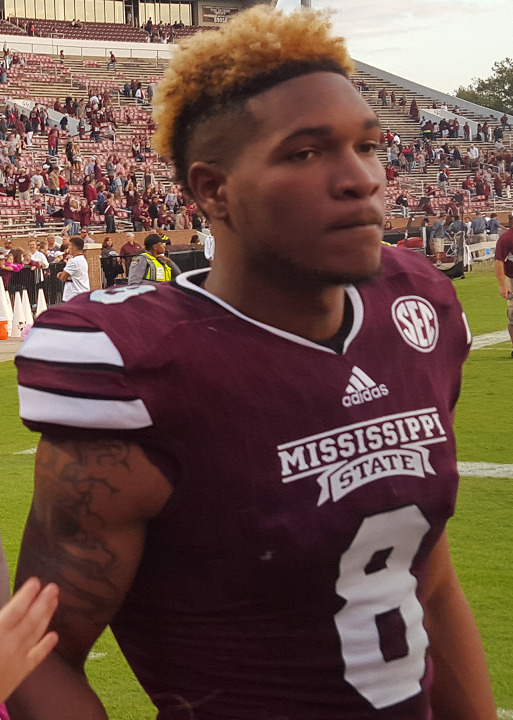
Fred Ross is the Bulldogs' career leader in receiving yards.

The Mississippi State Bulldogs football statistical leaders are individual statistical leaders of the Mississippi State Bulldogs football program in various categories, including passing, rushing, total offense, all-purpose yardage, receiving, defensive stats, and kicking. Within those areas, the lists identify single-game, single-season and career leaders. The Bulldogs represent Mississippi State University in the NCAA's Southeastern Conference.

Although Mississippi State began competing in intercollegiate football in 1895, the school's official record book considers the "modern era" to have begun in the 1940s. Records from before this year are often incomplete and inconsistent, and they are generally not included in these lists, although on some lists records from the 1930s or even the 1900s appear.

These lists are dominated by more recent players for several reasons:

- Since 1955, seasons have increased from 10 games to 11 and then 12 games in length.
- The NCAA did not allow freshmen to play varsity football until 1972 (with the exception of the World War II years), allowing players to have four-year careers.
- Bowl games only began counting toward single-season and career statistics in 2002. The Bulldogs have played in 14 bowl games since then.
- As of the 2022 season, recent head coach Dan Mullen, who used a spread offensive system, had eight of his nine seasons at Mississippi State (2009–17) in the Bulldogs' ten highest in total offensive yardage, the other two belonging to Mike Leach in 2021 and 2022. During the Mike Leach Era (2020–22), the Bulldogs ran an air raid offense, leading to all three seasons being in the five highest in total passing yards with two seasons in the ten highest in total offensive yardage.

These lists are updated through the end of the 2025 season.

== Passing ==
=== Completions ===
Career
Rank	Player	Comp	Years
1	Will Rogers	1,301	2020 2021 2022 2023
2	Dak Prescott	734	2012 2013 2014 2015
3	Nick Fitzgerald	511	2015 2016 2017 2018
4	Wayne Madkin	462	1998 1999 2000 2001
5	Kevin Fant	461	2000 2001 2002 2003
6	Tyler Russell	410	2010 2011 2012 2013
7	Derrick Taite	362	1993 1994 1995 1996
8	Tony Shell	349	1988 1989 1990
9	Don Smith	342	1983 1984 1985 1986
10	Tommy Pharr	339	1967 1968 1969

Single season
Rank	Player	Comp	Year
1	Will Rogers	505	2021
2	Will Rogers	415	2022
3	Dak Prescott	316	2015
4	Dak Prescott	244	2014
5	Will Rogers	239	2020
6	Tyler Russell	231	2012
7	Nick Fitzgerald	196	2016
8	Blake Shapen	195	2025
9	Kevin Fant	186	2003
10	Tommy Pharr	173	1968

Single game
Rank	Player	Comp	Year	Opponent
1	Will Rogers	50	2021	Memphis
2	Will Rogers	47	2021	LSU
3	Will Rogers	46	2021	Texas A&M
4	Will Rogers	45	2020	Ole Miss
5	Will Rogers	44	2021	Auburn
6	K. J. Costello	43	2020	Arkansas
7	Will Rogers	42	2022	Auburn
8	Will Rogers	41	2020	Georgia
	Will Rogers	41	2021	Vanderbilt
10	Will Rogers	39	2021	Louisiana Tech
	Will Rogers	39	2022	Arizona
	Will Rogers	39	2022	Bowling Green

=== Passing yards ===
Career
Rank	Player	Yards	Years
1	Will Rogers	12,315	2020 2021 2022 2023
2	Dak Prescott	9,376	2012 2013 2014 2015
3	Wayne Madkin	6,336	1998 1999 2000 2001
4	Nick Fitzgerald	6,207	2015 2016 2017 2018
5	Kevin Fant	5,631	2000 2001 2002 2003
6	Tyler Russell	5,441	2010 2011 2012 2013
7	Derrick Taite	5,232	1993 1994 1995 1996
8	Don Smith	5,229	1983 1984 1985 1986
9	John Bond	4,621	1980 1981 1982 1983
10	Tony Shell	4,292	1988 1989 1990

Single season
Rank	Player	Yards	Year
1	Will Rogers	4,739	2021
2	Will Rogers	3,974	2022
3	Dak Prescott	3,793	2015
4	Dak Prescott	3,449	2014
5	Tyler Russell	2,897	2012
6	Blake Shapen	2,433	2025
7	Dave Marler	2,422	1978
8	Nick Fitzgerald	2,413	2016
9	Don Smith	2,332	1985
10	Derrick Taite	2,241	1995

Single game
Rank	Player	Yards	Year	Opponent
1	K. J. Costello	623	2020	LSU
2	Dak Prescott	508	2015	Arkansas
3	Will Rogers	487	2023	South Carolina
4	Derrick Taite	466	1994	Tulane
5	Dak Prescott	453	2014	Georgia Tech (Orange Bowl)
6	Will Rogers	450	2022	Memphis
7	Will Rogers	440	2020	Ole Miss
8	Dave Marler	429	1978	Alabama
9	Wesley Carroll	421	2007	Arkansas
10	Will Rogers	419	2021	Memphis

=== Passing touchdowns ===
Career
Rank	Player	TDs	Years
1	Will Rogers	94	2020 2021 2022 2023
2	Dak Prescott	70	2012 2013 2014 2015
3	Nick Fitzgerald	55	2015 2016 2017 2018
4	Tyler Russell	42	2010 2011 2012 2013
5	Derrick Taite	38	1993 1994 1995 1996
6	Wayne Madkin	34	1998 1999 2000 2001
7	Kevin Fant	33	2000 2001 2002 2003
8	Don Smith	31	1983 1984 1985 1986
9	Chris Relf	28	2008 2009 2010 2011
10	Tony Shell	25	1988 1989 1990

Single season
Rank	Player	TDs	Year
1	Will Rogers	36	2021
2	Will Rogers	35	2022
3	Dak Prescott	29	2015
4	Dak Prescott	27	2014
5	Tyler Russell	24	2012
6	Nick Fitzgerald	21	2016
7	Kamario Taylor	17	2026
8	Derrick Taite	16	1995
	Nick Fitzgerald	16	2018
10	Don Smith	15	1985
	Nick Fitzgerald	15	2017
	Blake Shapen	15	2025

Single game
Rank	Player	TDs	Year	Opponent
1	Will Rogers	6	2021	Auburn
	Will Rogers	6	2022	Bowling Green
3	Dak Prescott	5	2015	Arkansas
	Nick Fitzgerald	5	2016	Samford
	Keytaon Thompson	5	2018	Stephen F. Austin
	K. J. Costello	5	2020	LSU
	Will Rogers	5	2021	Tennessee State
	Will Rogers	5	2022	Memphis
	Will Rogers	5	2022	East Tennessee State
10	Tony Shell	4	1988	Georgia
	Tony Shell	4	1988	Alabama
	Derrick Taite	4	1994	Tulane
	Derrick Taite	4	1995	Memphis
	Omarr Conner	4	2005	Murray State
	Wesley Carroll	4	2007	Arkansas
	Tyler Russell	4	2010	Memphis
	Tyler Russell	4	2012	Arkansas
	Dak Prescott	4	2014	Southern Miss
	Dak Prescott	4	2014	UAB
	Dak Prescott	4	2015	Missouri
	Dak Prescott	4	2015	NC State (Belk Bowl)
	Nick Fitzgerald	4	2018	Louisiana Tech
	Nick Fitzgerald	4	2018	Arkansas
	Will Rogers	4	2021	Vanderbilt
	Will Rogers	4	2021	Arkansas
	Will Rogers	4	2022	Arizona
	Blake Shapen	4	2025	Texas
	Kamario Taylor	4	2026	UL Monroe
	Kamario Taylor	4	2026	South Carolina

== Rushing ==
=== Rushing yards ===
Career
Rank	Player	Yards	Years
1	Anthony Dixon	3,994	2006 2007 2008 2009
2	Nick Fitzgerald	3,607	2015 2016 2017 2018
3	Jerious Norwood	3,212	2002 2003 2004 2005
4	Walter Packer	2,820	1973 1974 1975 1976
5	Michael Davis	2,721	1991 1992 1993 1994
6	Michael Haddix	2,558	1979 1980 1981 1982
7	Aeris Williams	2,557	2015 2016 2017 2018
8	LaDarius Perkins	2,554	2010 2011 2012 2013
9	Kylin Hill	2,535	2017 2018 2019 2020
10	Dak Prescott	2,521	2012 2013 2014 2015

Single season
Rank	Player	Yards	Year
1	Anthony Dixon	1,391	2009
2	Nick Fitzgerald	1,385	2016
3	J.J. Johnson	1,383	1998
4	Kylin Hill	1,350	2019
5	Josh Robinson	1,203	2014
6	Wayne Jones	1,193	1973
7	Vick Ballard	1,189	2011
8	Jerious Norwood	1,126	2005
9	Nick Fitzgerald	1,121	2018
10	Aeris Williams	1,107	2017

Single game
Rank	Player	Yards	Year	Opponent
1	Nick Fitzgerald	258	2016	Ole Miss
2	Anthony Dixon	252	2009	Kentucky
3	Jerious Norwood	247	2005	Houston
4	J.J. Johnson	237	1998	Alabama
5	Kylin Hill	234	2019	Arkansas
6	Kevin Bouie	217	1994	Kentucky
7	Kylin Hill	211	2018	Kansas State
8	J.J. Johnson	209	1998	Kentucky
9	Jerious Norwood	204	2005	Ole Miss
10	Jerious Norwood	201	2004	UAB

=== Rushing touchdowns ===
Career
Rank	Player	TDs	Years
1	Nick Fitzgerald	46	2015 2016 2017 2018
2	Anthony Dixon	42	2006 2007 2008 2009
3	Dak Prescott	41	2012 2013 2014 2015
4	Vick Ballard	29	2010 2011
5	Michael Davis	27	1991 1992 1993 1994
6	Jackie Parker	24	1952 1953
	John Bond	24	1980 1981 1983 1983
	J.J. Johnson	24	1997 1998
9	Dontae Walker	22	1999 2000 2001 2002
	Jo'Quavious Marks	22	2020 2021 2022 2023

Single season
Rank	Player	TDs	Year
1	Vick Ballard	19	2010
2	Jackie Parker	16	1952
	Nick Fitzgerald	16	2016
4	Anthony Dixon	14	2007
	Dak Prescott	14	2014
	Nick Fitzgerald	14	2017
7	John Bond	13	1983
	Keffer McGee	13	1995
	Dak Prescott	13	2013
	Nick Fitzgerald	13	2018

Single game
Rank	Player	TDs	Year	Opponent
1	Harry Furman	7	1907	Southern Baptist
	Harry Furman	7	1907	Mercer
	Harry McArthur	7	1914	Cumberland
4	Jackie Parker	4	1952	Arkansas State
	Art Davis	4	1954	LSU
	James Jones	4	1978	Memphis State
	John Bond	4	1983	LSU
	Keffer McGee	4	1995	Northeast Louisiana
	J.J. Johnson	4	1997	UCF
	Nick Fitzgerald	4	2016	Arkansas
	Nick Fitzgerald	4	2018	Louisiana–Lafayette

== Receiving ==
=== Receptions ===
Career
Rank	Player	Rec	Years
1	Jo'Quavious Marks	214	2020 2021 2022 2023
2	Fred Ross	199	2013 2014 2015 2016
3	David Smith	162	1968 1969 1970
4	Chad Bumphis	159	2009 2010 2011 2012
5	Austin Williams	150	2018 2019 2020 2021 2022
6	Dillon Johnson	149	2020 2021 2022
7	Sammy Milner	146	1968 1969 1970
	Jaden Walley	146	2020 2021 2022 2023 2024
9	Anthony Evans III	140	2025 2026
10	Justin Jenkins	139	2000 2001 2002 2003

Single season
Rank	Player	Rec	Year
1	Makai Polk	105	2021
2	Fred Ross	88	2015
3	Jo'Quavious Marks	83	2021
4	David Smith	74	1970
	Kevin Coleman	74	2024
6	Anthony Evans III	73	2026
7	Fred Ross	72	2016
8	Anthony Evans III	67	2025
9	Dillon Johnson	65	2021
10	Sammy Milner	64	1968
	Sammy Milner	64	1969
	Jameon Lewis	64	2013

Single game
Rank	Player	Rec	Year	Opponent
1	Eric Moulds	15	1995	Tennessee
	Kylin Hill	15	2020	Kentucky
3	David Smith	14	1969	Ole Miss
4	Makai Polk	13	2021	Texas A&M
5	Sammy Milner	12	1968	Texas Tech
	David Smith	12	1970	Auburn
	Fred Ross	12	2015	Ole Miss
	Anthony Evans III	12	2026	Alabama
9	Bobby Gossett	11	1968	Richmond
	David Smith	11	1969	Florida State
	Fred Ross	11	2015	Texas A&M
	Fred Ross	11	2015	Missouri
	Makai Polk	11	2021	Memphis
	Jo'Quavious Marks	11	2022	Arkansas
	Anthony Evans III	11	2025	Florida

=== Receiving yards ===
Career
Rank	Player	Yards	Years
1	Fred Ross	2,528	2013 2014 2015 2016
2	Chad Bumphis	2,270	2009 2010 2011 2012
3	Mardye McDole	2,214	1977 1978 1979 1980
4	David Smith	2,168	1968 1969 1970
5	Eric Moulds	2,022	1993 1994 1995
6	Justin Jenkins	1,974	2000 2001 2002 2003
7	De'Runnya Wilson	1,949	2013 2014 2015
8	Sammy Milner	1,806	1968 1969 1970
9	Danny Knight	1,773	1980 1981 1982 1983
10	Anthony Evans III	1,760	2025 2026

Single season
Rank	Player	Yards	Year
1	Brenen Thompson	1,054	2025
2	Makai Polk	1,046	2021
3	Mardye McDole	1,035	1978
4	Fred Ross	1,007	2015
5	David Smith	987	1970
6	Kevin Coleman	932	2024
7	Anthony Evans III	929	2026
8	Danny Knight	924	1982
9	Jameon Lewis	923	2013
10	Chad Bumphis	922	2012

Single game
Rank	Player	Yards	Year	Opponent
1	Lideatrick Griffin	256	2023	South Carolina
2	Jameon Lewis	220	2013	Rice (Liberty Bowl)
3	David Smith	215	1970	Texas Tech
4	Sammy Milner	208	1968	Texas Tech
	Danny Knight	208	1982	Florida
	Jamayel Smith	208	2007	Arkansas
7	Donald Gray	207	2016	Samford
8	David Smith	194	1969	Ole Miss
9	Tony Burks	192	2006	Kentucky
10	Eric Moulds	183	1995	Tennessee
	Osirus Mitchell	183	2020	LSU

=== Receiving touchdowns ===
Career
Rank	Player	TDs	Years
1	Chad Bumphis	24	2009 2010 2011 2012
2	De'Runnya Wilson	22	2013 2014 2015
	Fred Ross	22	2013 2014 2015 2016
4	Eric Moulds	17	1993 1994 1995
	Justin Jenkins	17	2000 2001 2002 2003
	Austin Williams	17	2018 2019 2020 2021 2022
7	Bill Buckley	14	1971 1972 1973
	Osirus Mitchell	14	2017 2018 2019 2020
9	Mardye McDole	13	1977 1978 1979 1980
	Jerry Bouldin	13	1987 1988 1989 1990

Single season
Rank	Player	TDs	Year
1	Chad Bumphis	12	2012
	Fred Ross	12	2016
3	De'Runnya Wilson	10	2015
4	Justin Jenkins	9	2003
	De'Runnya Wilson	9	2014
	Makai Polk	9	2021
7	Justin Jenkins	8	2001
	Caleb Ducking	8	2022
9	Bill Buckley	7	1973
	Mardye McDole	7	1978
	Danny Knight	7	1982
	Eric Moulds	7	1994
	Rara Thomas	7	2022

Single game
Rank	Player	TDs	Year	Opponent
1	Sammy Milner	3	1969	Florida
	Chad Bumphis	3	2012	Troy
	Donald Gray	3	2016	Samford
	Austin Williams	3	2021	Tennessee State

== Total offense ==
Total offense is the sum of passing and rushing statistics. It does not include receiving or returns.

=== Total offense yards ===
Career
Rank	Player	Yards	Years
1	Will Rogers	11,999	2020 2021 2022 2023
2	Dak Prescott	11,897	2012 2013 2014 2015
3	Nick Fitzgerald	9,814	2015 2016 2017 2018
4	Don Smith	7,097	1983 1984 1985 1986
5	John Bond	6,901	1980 1981 1982 1983
6	Wayne Madkin	6,482	1998 1999 2000 2001
7	Tyler Russell	5,558	2010 2011 2012 2013
8	Kevin Fant	5,424	2000 2001 2002 2003
9	Derrick Taite	5,405	1993 1994 1995 1996
10	Chris Relf	4,872	2008 2009 2010 2011

Single season
Rank	Player	Yards	Year
1	Will Rogers	4,642	2021
2	Dak Prescott	4,435	2014
3	Dak Prescott	4,381	2015
4	Will Rogers	3,809	2022
5	Nick Fitzgerald	3,798	2016
6	Tyler Russell	2,892	2012
7	Nick Fitzgerald	2,888	2018
8	Don Smith	2,886	1985
9	Dak Prescott	2,769	2013
10	Nick Fitzgerald	2,738	2017

Single game
Rank	Player	Yards	Year	Opponent
1	K. J. Costello	585	2020	LSU
2	Dak Prescott	554	2015	Arkansas
3	Nick Fitzgerald	536	2016	Samford
4	Dak Prescott	500	2014	Georgia Tech (Orange Bowl)
5	Will Rogers	487	2023	South Carolina
6	Keytaon Thompson	473	2018	Stephen F. Austin
7	Derrick Taite	468	1994	Tulane
8	Will Rogers	466	2020	Ole Miss
9	Dak Prescott	465	2015	Kentucky
10	Nick Fitzgerald	459	2016	Arkansas

=== Touchdowns responsible for ===
"Touchdowns responsible for" is the NCAA's official term for combined passing and rushing touchdowns.

Career
Rank	Player	TDs	Years
1	Dak Prescott	111	2012 2013 2014 2015
2	Nick Fitzgerald	101	2015 2016 2017 2018
3	Will Rogers	96	2020 2021 2022 2023
4	Don Smith	52	1983 1984 1985 1986
5	Tyler Russell	45	2010 2011 2012 2013
6	John Bond	42	1980 1981 1982 1983
	Anthony Dixon	42	2006 2007 2008 2009
8	Wayne Madkin	41	1998 1999 2000 2001
9	Derrick Taite	40	1993 1994 1995 1996
10	Chris Relf	37	2008 2009 2010 2011

Single season
Rank	Player	TDs	Year
1	Dak Prescott	41	2014
2	Dak Prescott	39	2015
3	Nick Fitzgerald	37	2016
4	Will Rogers	37	2021
5	Will Rogers	35	2022
6	Nick Fitzgerald	29	2017
	Nick Fitzgerald	29	2018
8	Tyler Russell	26	2012
9	Jackie Parker	24	1952
10	Dak Prescott	23	2013

Single game
Rank	Player	TDs	Year	Opponent
1	Dak Prescott	7	2015	Arkansas
	Nick Fitzgerald	7	2016	Samford
	Keytaon Thompson	7	2018	Stephen F. Austin
4	Jackie Parker	6	1952	Auburn
	Dak Prescott	6	2015	Kentucky
	Nick Fitzgerald	6	2016	Arkansas
	Nick Fitzgerald	6	2018	Louisiana–Lafayette
	Will Rogers	6	2021	Auburn
	Will Rogers	6	2022	Bowling Green
10	John Bond	5	1983	LSU
	Dak Prescott	5	2013	Rice (Liberty Bowl)
	Dak Prescott	5	2014	UAB
	Dak Prescott	5	2014	Texas A&M
	Nick Fitzgerald	5	2016	Ole Miss
	Nick Fitzgerald	5	2017	Louisiana Tech
	Nick Fitzgerald	5	2018	Arkansas
	K. J. Costello	5	2020	LSU
	Will Rogers	5	2021	Tennessee State
	Will Rogers	5	2022	Memphis
	Will Rogers	5	2022	East Tennessee State
	Kamario Taylor	5	2026	UL Monroe

== All-purpose yardage ==
All-purpose yardage is the sum of all yards credited to a player who is in possession of the ball. It includes rushing, receiving, and all types of returns, but does not include passing.

Career
Rank	Player	Yards	Years
1	Anthony Dixon	4,443	2006 2007 2008 2009
2	LaDarius Perkins	4,253	2010 2011 2012 2013
3	Walter Packer	4,169	1973 1974 1975 1976
4	Tony James	3,973	1989 1990 1991 1992
5	Jerious Norwood	3,750	2002 2003 2004 2005
6	Nick Fitzgerald	3,616	2015 2016 2017 2018
7	David Smith	3,572	1968 1969 1970
8	Derek Pegues	3,531	2005 2006 2007 2008
9	Chad Bumphis	3,380	2009 2010 2011 2012
10	Mardye McDole	3,353	1977 1978 1979 1980

Single season
Rank	Player	Yards	Year
1	Nick Turner	1,664	2003
2	Josh Robinson	1,573	2014
3	Kevin Prentiss	1,546	1998
4	Jameon Lewis	1,537	2013
5	Kylin Hill	1,530	2019
6	Anthony Dixon	1,514	2009
7	Dicenzo Miller	1,513	2000
8	LaDarius Perkins	1,509	2012
9	James Johnson	1,481	1998
10	Nick Fitzgerald	1,384	2016

Single game
Rank	Player	Yards	Year	Opponent
1	Nick Turner	344	2003	Tennessee
2	LaDarius Perkins	319	2010	Ole Miss
3	James Johnson	312	1998	Alabama
4	Jameon Lewis	267	2013	Rice (Liberty Bowl)
5	Anthony Dixon	266	2009	Kentucky
6	David Smith	265	1969	LSU
	Jerious Norwood	265	2005	Houston
	Lideatrick Griffin	265	2023	South Carolina
9	LaDarius Perkins	261	2012	Troy
10	Eric Moulds	258	1994	LSU
	Nick Fitzgerald	258	2016	Ole Miss

== Defense ==
Defensive stats are as shown below.

=== Interceptions ===
Career
Rank	Player	Ints	Years
1	Walt Harris	16	1992 1993 1994 1995
	Johnthan Banks	16	2009 2010 2011 2012
3	Nickoe Whitley	15	2010 2011 2012 2013
4	Emmanuel Forbes	14	2020 2021 2022
5	Izell McGill	12	1994 1995 1996 1997
	Derek Pegues	12	2005 2006 2007 2008
7	Henry Davison	11	1974 1975 1976 1977
	Kenny Johnson	11	1976 1977 1978 1979
9	Frank Dowsing	10	1970 1971 1972
	Steve Freeman	10	1972 1973 1974
	Kelvin Knight	10	1990 1991 1992 1993
	Fred Smoot	10	1999 2000
	Corey Broomfield	10	2009 2010 2011 2012

Single season
Rank	Player	Ints	Year
1	Bobby Bethune	6	1960
	Bill Crick	6	1969
	Walt Harris	6	1993
	Walt Harris	6	1994
	Izell McGill	6	1997
	Corey Broomfield	6	2009
	Mark McLaurin	6	2017
	Emmanuel Forbes	6	2022

Single game–Modern Era
Rank	Player	Ints	Year	Opponent
1	Jack Nix	3	1939	Arkansas
	Billy Murphy	3	1946	Ole Miss
	Billy Stacy	3	1958	Ole Miss
	Henry Davison	3	1976	Auburn
	Darren Williams	3	2002	Troy
	Jeramie Johnson	3	2005	Ole Miss
	Richie Brown	3	2014	Texas A&M
	Mark McLaurin	3	2017	Louisville (TaxSlayer Bowl)

=== Tackles ===
Career
Rank	Player	Tackles	Years
1	Ray Costict	467	1973 1974 1975 1976
2	Harvey Hull	454	1973 1974 1975 1976
3	James Williams	448	1986 1987 1988 1989
4	Reggie Stewart	442	1987 1988 1989 1990
5	Johnie Cooks	392	1977 1978 1980 1981
6	Dwayne Curry	391	1993 1994 1995 1996
7	Nathaniel Watson	379	2018 2019 2020 2021 2022 2023
8	Billy Jackson	360	1980 1981 1982 1983
9	Mario Haggan	359	1999 2000 2001 2002
10	Cedric Corse	355	1984 1985 1986 1987

Single season
Rank	Player	Tackles	Year
1	Calvin Zanders	186	1983
2	Billy Jackson	180	1983
3	Reggie Stewart	179	1990
4	John Miller	164	1982
5	James Williams	163	1988
6	James Williams	157	1989
7	Ray Costict	156	1974
	Ray Costict	156	1976
9	Ray Costict	155	1975
10	Aaron Pearson	148	1984

Single game
Rank	Player	Tackles	Year	Opponent
1	Ray Costict	29	1976	Kentucky

=== Sacks ===
Career
Rank	Player	Sacks	Years
1	Billy Jackson	49.0	1980 1981 1982 1983
2	Tyrone Keys	26.0	1977 1978 1979 1980
3	Willie Evans	24.5	2002 2003 2004 2005
4	Johnie Cooks	24.0	1977 1978 1980 1981
5	Mike McEnany	22.0	1979 1980 1981 1982
	Montez Sweat	22.0	2017 2018
7	Nathaniel Watson	21.0	2018 2019 2020 2021 2022 2023
8	Greg Favors	19.5	1994 1995 1996 1997
9	Titus Brown	18.5	2004 2005 2006 2007
10	Tyrus Wheat	18.0	2020 2021 2022

Single season
Rank	Player	Sacks	Year
1	Billy Jackson	17.0	1980
2	Billy Jackson	15.0	1981
	Willie Evans	15.0	2005
4	Greg Favors	13.0	1996
5	Mike McEnany	12.5	1981
6	Edward Smith	12.0	1998
7	Montez Sweat	11.5	2018
8	Montez Sweat	10.5	2017
9	Tyrone Keys	10.0	1980
	Robert Young	10.0	1989
	Nathaniel Watson	10.0	2023

Single game
Rank	Player	Sacks	Year	Opponent
1	Greg Favors	5.5	1996	Ole Miss

== Kicking ==
=== Field goals made ===
Career
Rank	Player	FGs	Years
1	Artie Cosby	48	1983 1984 1985 1986
2	Kyle Ferrie	45	2023 2024 2025 2026
3	Brian Hazelwood	43	1995 1996 1997 1998
4	Joel Logan	41	1987 1988 1989 1990
5	Dana Moore	34	1979 1980 1981 1982
6	Derek DePasquale	32	2009 2010 2011
7	Jace Christmann	32	2017 2018 2019 2020
8	Scott Westerfield	30	1999 2000
9	Evan Sobiesk	27	2013 2014 2015
10	Westin Graves	26	2014 2015 2016

Single season
Rank	Player	FGs	Year
1	Scott Westerfield	18	1999
2	Tom Burke	17	1993
	Kyle Ferrie	17	2025
4	Brian Hazelwood	16	1997
	Brent Smith	16	2002
	Kyle Ferrie	16	2023
7	Chris Gardner	15	1992
	Brian Hazelwood	15	1998
	Westin Graves	15	2015
10	Devon Bell	14	2012

Single game
Rank	Player	FGs	Year	Opponent
1	Tim Rogers	5	1994	NC State (Peach Bowl)
	Brian Hazelwood	5	1998	Arkansas
	Derek DePasquale	5	2010	UAB

=== Field goal percentage ===
Career
Rank	Player	FG%	Years
1	Kyle Ferrie	80.4%	2023 2024 2025 2026
2	Brent Smith	80.0%	2002 2003
	Jace Christmann	80.0%	2017 2018 2019 2020
4	Derek DePasquale	76.2%	2009 2010 2011
5	Scott Westerfield	71.4%	1999 2000
6	Westin Graves	68.4%	2014 2015 2016
7	Joel Logan	67.2%	1987 1988 1989 1990
8	Dana Moore	66.7%	1979 1980 1981 1982
9	Adam Carlson	59.5%	2005 2006 2007 2008
10	Artie Cosby	59.3%	1983 1984 1985 1986

Single season
Rank	Player	FG%	Year
1	Evan Sobiesk	85.7%	2014
	Jace Christmann	85.7%	2017
3	Kyle Ferrie	85.0%	2025
4	Derek DePasquale	83.3%	2009
	Derek DePasquale	83.3%	2010
	Westin Graves	83.3%	2015
	Brandon Ruiz	83.3%	2020
	Kyle Ferrie	83.3%	2024
9	Dana Moore	81.3%	1982
10	Brent Smith	80.0%	2002
	Brent Smith	80.0%	2003
	Jace Christmann	80.0%	2019
	Massimo Biscardi	80.0%	2022

== See also ==
- Mississippi State Bulldogs men's basketball statistical leaders
- Mississippi State Bulldogs women's basketball statistical leaders
