= 2014 Orange Bowl =

2014 Orange Bowl can refer to:

- 2014 Orange Bowl (January), played as part of the 2013–14 college football bowl season between the Clemson Tigers and the Ohio State Buckeyes
- 2014 Orange Bowl (December), played as part of the 2014–15 college football bowl season between the Georgia Tech Yellow Jackets and the Mississippi State Bulldogs
