= Wayne Madkin =

American football player (born 1979)

No. 9
- Position: Quarterback

Personal information
- Born: August 11, 1979 (age 47); Huntsville, Alabama, U.S.

Career information
- High school: Huntsville (AL) J. O. Johnson
- College: Mississippi State (1998–2001)

Wayne Madkin (born August 11, 1979) is an American former football quarterback who played for the Mississippi State Bulldogs in 1998, 1999, 2000, and 2001.

Madkin graduated as Mississippi State's all-time leading passer with 6,336 yards and held the record until it was broken by Dak Prescott in 2015. Madkin led the Bulldogs to three consecutive bowl games following the 1998–2000 seasons and to the 1998 SEC Championship Game. The Bulldogs were 2–1 in the bowl games that Madkin started, losing the 1999 Cotton Bowl to Texas and winning the 1999 Peach Bowl over Clemson and the 2000 Independence Bowl over Texas A&M.

No quarterback in State history won as many games as Madkin, who led the Bulldogs to 25 victories as a starter from 1998 to 2001. At the time he set school career records for passing attempts, completions, and passing yards. He guided MSU to three consecutive bowl games and a SEC Western Division Championship as a starter, including the 1998 SEC Championship Game, 1998 Cotton Bowl, 1999 Peach Bowl and the 2000 Independence Bowl.

A native of Huntsville, Alabama, Madkin was named to MSU's All Century Team and earned an undergraduate degree from Mississippi State in 2001 and a Master of Business Administration from the University of North Alabama in 2006.
