= Chad Bumphis =

American football player and coach (born 1989)

Utah Utes
- Title: Wide receivers coach

Personal information
- Born: October 18, 1989 (age 37); Tupelo, Mississippi, U.S.
- Listed height: 5 ft 10 in (1.78 m)
- Listed weight: 200 lb (91 kg)

Career information
- High school: Tupelo (MS)
- College: Mississippi State (2009–2012)
- NFL draft: 2013: undrafted

Career history

Playing
- Miami Dolphins (2013)*; Denver Broncos (2013)*; Jacksonville Jaguars (2013–2014)*; Edmonton Eskimos (2014–2015)*
- * Offseason or practice squad member only

Coaching
- Iowa Wesleyan (2016) Wide receivers coach; Buffalo (2017) Graduate assistant; Utah (2018) Graduate assistant; Austin Peay (2019–2020) Wide receivers coach; Utah (2021–2022) Wide receivers coach; Mississippi State (2023–2025) Wide receivers coach; Utah (2026–present) Wide receivers coach

Awards and highlights
- Second-team All-SEC (2012)
- Stats at Pro Football Reference

Chad Lemar Bumphis (born October 18, 1989) is an American college football coach and former professional wide receiver. He is the wide receivers coach for the University of Utah, a position he has held since 2026.

Bumphis was signed as an undrafted free agent by the Miami Dolphins in 2013. He played college football at Mississippi State University, where he holds the school record for career receiving touchdowns. He also held the school record for receiving yards until he was passed by Fred Ross.

== Professional career ==
=== Miami Dolphins ===
He was signed by the Miami Dolphins on May 3, 2013. He was waived on August 31, 2013.

=== Denver Broncos ===
He was signed to the Denver Broncos' practice squad on October 22, 2013. He was waived on November 28, 2013.

=== Jacksonville Jaguars ===
He was signed to the Jacksonville Jaguars' practice squad on December 9, 2013. He was signed to the active roster at the conclusion of the 2013 regular season. The Jaguars released Bumphis on August 29, 2014.

=== Edmonton Eskimos ===
Bumphis was signed by the Edmonton Eskimos to their practice roster on October 9, 2014.
