= Derrick Taite =

American football player

Profile
- Position: Quarterback

Personal information
- Born: Moss Point, Mississippi, U.S.
- Listed height: 6 ft 4 in (1.93 m)
- Listed weight: 200 lb (91 kg)

Career information
- High school: Moss Point
- College: Mississippi State (1992–1996)
- NFL draft: 1997: undrafted

Career history
- Montreal Alouettes (1998)*; Mississippi Fire Dogs (1999); Tennessee Valley Vipers (2000); Mississippi Fire Dogs (2000–2001); Florida Firecats (2002); Beaumont Drillers (2003)
- * Offseason or practice squad member only

Derrick Taite is an American former football quarterback. He ended his college football career as the all-time passing leader for the Mississippi State Bulldogs. He later played professionally in several indoor football leagues.

== Early life ==
Derrick Taite was born in Moss Point, Mississippi. He played high school football at Moss Point High School, throwing for over 3,000 yards in his last three seasons from 1988 to 1990. He threw for 19 touchdowns and over 1,500 yards as a junior in 1989, earning all-state honors. Taite scored a passing touchdown and a rushing touchdown in the 1991 Mississippi-Alabama High School All-Star Game.

== College career ==
Taite enrolled at Mississippi State University to play college football for the Bulldogs. He redshirted the 1992 season and was a four-year letterman from 1993 to 1996. He backed up Todd Jordan in 1993, completing 12 of 34 passes (35.3%) for 176 yards, two touchdowns, and one interception while also rushing for one touchdown. Taite was arrested on November 7, 1993, and a charged with attempted rape after an incident at a party. In February 1994, a jury failed to indict him. Taite took over as starter in 1994. On October 22, 1994, against Tulane, he threw for a school record 466 yards. He finished the year completing 110 of 220 passes (50.0%) for 1,806 yards, 14 touchdowns, and eight interceptions while also scoring a rushing touchdown. His 16.4 yards-per-completion was the highest in the Southeastern Conference (SEC).

In 1995, Taite recorded 165 completions on 309 attempts (53.4%) for 2,241 yards, 16 touchdowns, and 11 interceptions. His 16 passing touchdowns were the most in school history although he also had the most interceptions in the SEC. In August 1996, he was one of three Mississippi State football players charged with malicious mischief after allegedly breaking a car window. The charges were dropped due to lack of evidence. In 1996, due to inconsistent play, Taite split time with redshirt freshman Matt Wyatt. On November 16, 1996, Taite led Mississippi State to a 17–16 victory over No. 8 Alabama, their third-straight victory over Alabama. He played in 39 games overall, starting 32, during his college career, completing 362 of 734 passes (49.3%) for 5,232 yards, 38 touchdowns, and 25 interceptions. He set school career records in completions, passing yards, and passing touchdowns. In March 1997, Taite was arrested for marijuana possession but cleared a month later. In August 1997, it was reported that Mississippi State head coach Jackie Sherrill had paid two private investigator $5,000 a piece to help fight Taite's 1993 attempted rape charge. The Connecticut Post reported that it was unclear if this violated any NCAA rules.

== Professional career ==
Taite signed with the Montreal Alouettes of the Canadian Football League in 1998. He was released on June 20, 1998, after the first of two preseason games.

In December 1998, Taite was drafted by the Mississippi Pride of the upstart Regional Football League. He did not report to training camp on March 22, 1999, instead signing with the Mississippi Fire Dogs of the Indoor Professional Football League. He started three games for the Firedogs in 1999 before suffering a season-ending injury.

On December 15, 1999, Taite was signed by the af2's Tennessee Valley Vipers for the 2000 season. He was a backup for the Vipers in 2000 after being beat out for the starting job by Bryan Snyder. Taite was released on May 1, 2000, after the fifth game of the season.

Taite rejoined the Fire Dogs in May 2000 as the backup to John Fourcade. Taite started some for the Fire Dogs in 2001, who were now members of the National Indoor Football League (NIFL).

Taite began the 2002 af2 season as the starting quarterback for the Florida Firecats. However, he was benched for Bryan Sparacino during the sixth game after completing less than 50% of his passes and only averaging 106.5 passing yards-per-game.

Taite began the 2003 season as the starting quarterback for the NIFL's Beaumont Drillers but later left the team.

== Post-playing career ==
Taite was in jail from October 7, 2004, until January 2, 2009, after being sentenced on a marijuana trafficking conspiracy conviction. In the 2010s, he founded youth nonprofit groups named "Fatherless Sons" and "Moss Point’s 100 Men."

== See also ==
- Mississippi State Bulldogs football statistical leaders
