= Fred Ross (American football) =

American football player (born 1995)

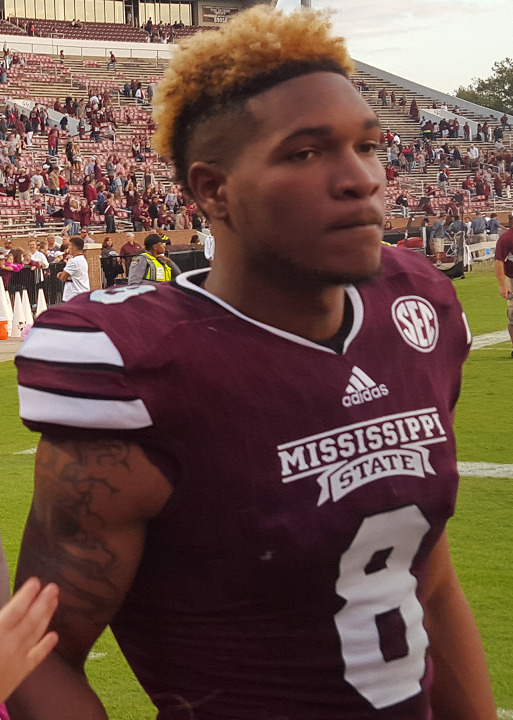
- Ross with Mississippi State

No. 2, 1
- Position: Wide receiver

Personal information
- Born: May 19, 1995 (age 31); Tyler, Texas, U.S.
- Listed height: 6 ft 2 in (1.88 m)
- Listed weight: 205 lb (93 kg)

Career information
- High school: John Tyler (Tyler, Texas)
- College: Mississippi State
- NFL draft: 2017: undrafted

Career history
- Carolina Panthers (2017–2018); Seattle Dragons (2020)*
- * Offseason or practice squad member only

Awards and highlights
- 2× First-team All-SEC (2015, 2016)
- Stats at Pro Football Reference

Frederick Darrell Ross Jr., (born May 19, 1995) is an American former football wide receiver. He played college football at Mississippi State.

== Early life ==
Ross attended John Tyler High School in Tyler, Texas, where he caught over 200 passes and was named a First-team Parade All-American.

Ross was rated as a four-star recruit by 247sports.com, ESPN, Rivals.com, and Scout.com. Ross received scholarship offers from Baylor, Memphis, Missouri, Texas Tech, Rice, and West Virginia, but committed to Oklahoma State on February 25, 2012.

A year later, Ross decided to instead sign with Mississippi State.

== College career ==
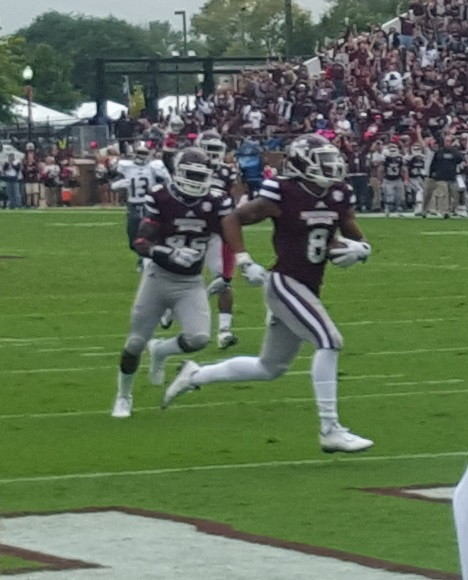
Ross scores a touchdown in a 2015 game against Troy.

=== Freshman season (2013) ===
Ross played as a true freshman and made his debut in the first game of the 2013 season, catching a pass in a 21–3 loss to Oklahoma State in the AdvoCare Texas Kickoff. Ross finished the season with nine catches for 115 yards.

=== Sophomore season (2014) ===
Ross played in every game for the Bulldogs in 2014. He caught his first two touchdowns in a 49–0 rout of Southern Miss. Ross came on strong in the second half of the season, with 24 catches for 382 yards over the last 7 games. This included a 107-yard performance against Arkansas and 102 yards in the Orange Bowl against Georgia Tech. Ross also saw limited action at punt returner in 2014.

=== Junior season (2015) ===
Ross has had a breakout season in 2015, leading the team in receptions. Highlights include nine receptions in a 21–19 loss to LSU, 11 receptions against Texas A&M, and a two-touchdown game (one receiving, one on a punt return) against Troy. Ross had 10 receptions in a 51–50 thriller over Arkansas and 12 receptions in an Egg Bowl loss to Ole Miss. Ross finished the season with a rushing touchdown and a receiving touchdown in the Belk Bowl against NC State.

Ross finished the season with a school-record 88 receptions (which was also the highest total in the SEC), and became the second receiver in MSU history to post a 1,000-yard season.

=== Senior season (2016) ===
Ross missed Spring practice before the 2016 season with a groin injury. On October 22 in a game against Kentucky, Ross became the Bulldogs' career leader in receptions.

=== Career statistics ===
			Receiving				Rushing				Punt returns			
Year	Team	Games	Rec	Yds	Long	TD	Att	Yds	Long	TD	Ret	Yds	Long	TD
2013	Mississippi State	11	9	115	23	0	0	0		0	0	0		0
2014	Mississippi State	13	30	489	69	5	2	6	7	0	7	75	34	0
2015	Mississippi State	13	88	1,007	59	5	2	42	33	1	17	155	77	1
2016	Mississippi State	13	72	917	60	12	2	39	60	0	14	78	16	0
Career		50	199	2,528	69	22	6	87	46	1	36	293	77	1

== Professional career ==
=== Carolina Panthers ===
Ross was not drafted in the 2017 NFL draft but signed with the Carolina Panthers following the draft. On September 1, 2017, he was placed on injured reserve after suffering a high ankle sprain.

On August 19, 2018, Ross was waived/injured by the Panthers with a hip injury and was placed on injured reserve. He was released on September 25, 2018.

=== Seattle Dragons ===
Ross was drafted by the Seattle Dragons 3rd round of the 2020 XFL Draft. The XFL is set to begin in February 2020. He was waived during final roster cuts on January 22, 2020.
