= Mardye McDole =

American football player (1959–2023)

No. 88
- Position: Wide receiver

Personal information
- Born: May 1, 1959; Pensacola, Florida, U.S.
- Died: March 28, 2023 (aged 63)
- Listed height: 5 ft 11 in (1.80 m)
- Listed weight: 198 lb (90 kg)

Career information
- High school: Murphy (Mobile, Alabama)
- College: Mississippi State
- NFL draft: 1981: 2nd round, 39th overall pick

Career history
- Minnesota Vikings (1981–1983)

Awards and highlights
- 2× First-team All-SEC (1978, 1980); Second-team All-SEC (1979)

Career NFL statistics
- Receptions: 3
- Receiving yards: 29
- Return yards: 196
- Stats at Pro Football Reference

Mardye McDole (May 1, 1959 – March 28, 2023) was an American professional football player who was a wide receiver for the Minnesota Vikings of the National Football League (NFL). McDole was selected by the Vikings in the second round of the 1981 NFL draft out of Mississippi State University. He was a physical education teacher and the varsity wide receiver coach at Murphy High School in Mobile, Alabama.

McDole was the first receiver in Mississippi State Bulldogs history to have had a 1,000-yard season.

McDole died on March 28, 2023, at the age of 63.
