= Tyler Russell =

American gridiron football player (born 1990)

No. 17
- Position: Quarterback

Personal information
- Born: December 6, 1990 (age 35); Meridian, Mississippi, U.S.
- Listed height: 6 ft 4 in (1.93 m)
- Listed weight: 221 lb (100 kg)

Career information
- High school: Meridian
- College: Mississippi State (2009–2013)
- NFL draft: 2014: undrafted

Career history
- Winnipeg Blue Bombers (2015)*
- * Offseason or practice squad member only

Tyler Ryan Russell (born December 6, 1990) is an American former football quarterback. He had played college football from 2010 to 2013 for the Mississippi State Bulldogs, ranking fifth on the Bulldogs' career passing list with 5,441 passing yards, and third on the career passing touchdowns list with 42.

== Early life ==
Russell attended Meridian High School, located in Meridian, Mississippi. As a senior in 2008, he led his team to the Mississippi 5A State Championship, where they snapped South Panola's 89-game winning streak dating back to 2003. Russell was named 2008's Mr. Football by The Clarion-Ledger. He was also named a Parade All-American.

Russell was rated as a four-star recruit by 247sports.com, Rivals.com, and Scout.com. He chose to attend Mississippi State over offers from Alabama and South Carolina.

== College career ==
=== Redshirt freshman season (2009) ===
Russell redshirted in 2009. First-year Mississippi State head coach Dan Mullen almost inserted him in the Bulldogs' loss to Houston but decided against it, preserving Russell's eligibility.

=== True freshman season (2010) ===
Russell appeared in 9 games in 2010, serving as the primary backup to quarterback Chris Relf. In his debut, he threw for 256 yards and a school record-tying 4 touchdown passes in a 49–7 rout of Memphis. His performance even earned him one vote in ESPN's Heisman Watch list. However, as the backup, he played sporadically over the season, only throwing for over 100 yards one more time, in a 49–16 defeat of Alcorn State.

=== Sophomore season (2011) ===
Russell began the 2011 season again serving as Relf's backup and only appeared in two of the Bulldogs' first five games. However, after the Bulldogs went into halftime down 3–0 to UAB, Russell played quarterback in the second half, throwing three touchdown passes and leading the Bulldogs to a 21–3 victory. Russell played the entire game the next week, a 14–12 loss to South Carolina, and split time with Relf over the rest of the season.

=== Junior season (2012) ===
Russell won the starting job in 2012 and played the majority of snaps in all 13 games. The season saw the Bulldogs start out 7–0 before limping to an 8–5 finish. Russell threw for a career-high 295 yards in a loss at LSU and again tied the school record with 4 touchdown passes in a 45–14 win over Arkansas. Over the 2012 season, Russell threw for 2,897 yards and 24 touchdowns, both of which were school records until Dak Prescott broke both in 2014.

=== Senior season (2013) ===
Russell was named one of the captains for the Bulldogs' 2013 season. He began the season as the starting quarterback, but left the opener against Oklahoma State after a concussion. He was replaced by Dak Prescott and only played sporadically for most of the rest of the season, although he did start late-season games against Alabama and Arkansas after Prescott was sidelined with a shoulder injury. Russell left the Arkansas game after injuring his shoulder and did not appear in any more games during the season.

=== Statistics ===
Year	Team	GP	Passing					
Year	Team	GP	Cmp	Att	Pct	Yds	TD	Int
2010	Mississippi State	9	39	67	58.2	635	5	6
2011	Mississippi State	9	69	129	53.5	1,034	8	4
2012	Mississippi State	13	231	394	58.6	2,897	24	10
2013	Mississippi State	7	71	109	65.1	875	5	3
Totals		38	410	699	58.7	5,441	42	23

== Professional career ==
Russell was signed to the Winnipeg Blue Bombers practice roster on August 19, 2015.
