= 2015 Belk Bowl =

- 14th Belk Bowl
NC State Wolfpack	Mississippi State Bulldogs
(7−5)	(8−4)
ACC	SEC
28	51
Head coach: Dave Doeren	Head coach: Dan Mullen
	1	2	3	4	Total
NC State	0	14	7	7	28
Mississippi State	14	17	6	14	51
- Date: December 30, 2015
- Season: 2015
- Stadium: Bank of America Stadium
- Location: Charlotte, North Carolina
- MVP: Dak Prescott (QB, Mississippi State)
- Favorite: Miss. State by 5
- Referee: Michael Batlan (Pac-12)
- Attendance: 46,423

United States TV coverage
- Network: ESPN/ESPN Radio
- Announcers: Clay Matvick, John Congemi, & Dawn Davenport (ESPN); Taylor Zarzour, Charles Arbuckle, & Quint Kessenich (ESPN Radio)

The 2015 Belk Bowl a college football bowl game that was played on December 30, 2015 at Bank of America Stadium in Charlotte, North Carolina in the United States. The fourteenth annual Belk Bowl, it matched the NC State Wolfpack and the Mississippi State Bulldogs. The game started at approximately 3:30 p.m. ET and was nationally televised by ESPN. It was one of the 2015–16 bowl games that concluded the 2015 season. It was sponsored by Charlotte-based department store Belk.

== Game summary ==
=== Scoring summary ===
Scoring summary

Quarter	Time	Drive			Team	Scoring information	Score	
Quarter	Time	Plays	Yards	TOP	Team	Scoring information	ST	MS
1	13:33	5	26	1:23	MS	Fred Ross 14-yard touchdown reception from Dak Prescott, Westin Graves kick good	0	7
1	3:31	4	68	1:46	MS	De'Runnya Wilson 28-yard touchdown run, Westin Graves kick good	0	14
2	12:17	2	67	0:18	MS	Fred Ross 33-yard touchdown run, Westin Graves kick good	0	21
2	11:16	2	76	0:55	NCST	Pharoah McKever 82-yard touchdown reception from Jacoby Brissett, Kyle Bambard kick good	7	21
2	6:43	4	57	1:07	NCST	Jaylen Samuels 48-yard touchdown run, Kyle Bambard kick good	14	21
2	3:18	9	74	3:19	MS	Justin Malone recovers fumble in the end zone for a touchdown, Westin Graves kick good	14	28
2	0:14	7	33	1:25	MS	39-yard field goal by Westin Graves	14	31
3	7:20	7	65	1:35	NCST	Jacoby Brissett 3-yard touchdown run, Kyle Bambard kick good	21	31
3	1:16	15	74	5:58	MS	Brandon Holloway 10-yard touchdown reception from Dak Prescott, Westin Graves kick failed	21	37
4	9:50	2	56	0:42	MS	Brandon Holloway 55-yard touchdown reception from Dak Prescott, Westin Graves kick good	21	44
4	5:38	5	51	1:49	MS	Aeris Williams 33-yard touchdown run, Westin Graves kick good	21	51
4	0:45	17	65	4:45	NCST	Jaylen Samuels 1-yard touchdown run, Kyle Bambard kick good	28	51
"TOP" = time of possession. For other American football terms, see Glossary of American football.							28	51

=== Statistics ===
Statistics	NCST	MSU
First downs	20	26
Total offense, plays – yards	79–424	77–569
Rushes-yards (net)	51–210	35–189
Passing yards (net)	214	380
Passes, Comp-Att-Int	12–28–2	25–42–1
Time of Possession	32:05	27:55
