= De'Runnya Wilson =

American football player (1994–2020)

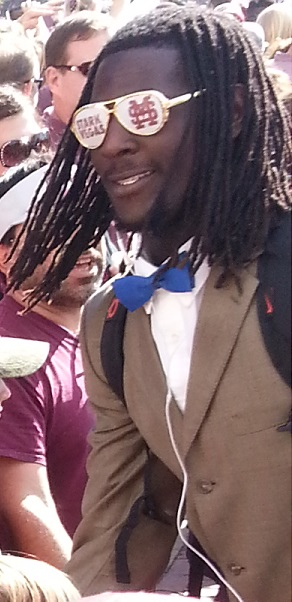
- Wilson in 2014

No. 1, 81
- Position: Wide receiver

Personal information
- Born: September 14, 1994; Birmingham, Alabama, U.S.
- Died: January 21, 2020 (aged 25); Birmingham, Alabama, U.S.
- Listed height: 6 ft 5 in (1.96 m)
- Listed weight: 218 lb (99 kg)

Career information
- High school: Wenonah (Birmingham)
- College: Mississippi State
- NFL draft: 2016: undrafted

Career history
- Albany Empire (2018)*
- * Offseason or practice squad member only

Awards and highlights
- Second-team All-SEC (2015)
- Stats at Pro Football Reference

De’Runnya S. Wilson (September 14, 1994 – January 21, 2020) was an American football wide receiver. He played college football for the Mississippi State Bulldogs.

== Early life ==
Wilson attended Wenonah High School in Birmingham, Alabama, where he was primarily a basketball star, earning first-team Parade All-American honors in 2013. He joined the football team in his senior season, when he caught 31 passes for 682 yards and helped lead the Dragons to a 10–2 season.

On the hardwood, he helped lead the Dragons to three consecutive state championships and was named the 2013 Alabama Mr. Basketball.

Wilson was rated as a three-star football recruit by 247sports.com, Rivals.com, and Scout.com. He chose to attend Mississippi State over offers from Auburn, Cincinnati, Colorado State, Louisville, Tennessee, and UAB.

== College career ==
=== Freshman season (2013) ===
Wilson made his debut in the first game of the 2013 season, catching 2 passes for 17 yards in a 21–3 loss to Oklahoma State in the AdvoCare Texas Kickoff. Wilson's first touchdown came on a 59-yard pass from Tyler Russell against LSU. Wilson had a breakout game against Texas A&M, catching 7 passes for 75 yards and 2 touchdowns.

After the football season ended, Wilson played on the Bulldogs men's basketball team. He appeared in 7 games, scoring 6 points and grabbing 11 rebounds.

=== Sophomore season (2014) ===
Wilson started every game at receiver for the Bulldogs in 2014. He had four catches and a touchdown in each of the Bulldogs' wins over top 10 teams LSU, Texas A&M, and Auburn, helping lead the Bulldogs to the #1 ranking. Wilson came on strong at the end of the season, having 8 catches each in losses to Alabama and Ole Miss. He followed it up with 9 catches and 2 touchdowns in the Orange Bowl. Wilson was the 2014 Bulldogs' leading receiver in receptions, yards, and touchdowns.

Wilson was listed on the 2014–15 men's basketball roster, but did not appear in any games. Wilson's career as a basketball player was over, as it turned out later.

=== Junior season (2015) ===
Wilson had 8 catches and a touchdown in a 21–19 loss to LSU. He had 102 yards and 2 touchdowns in a rainy 31–13 win over Missouri and a career-high 10 receptions in a 51–50 thriller over Arkansas.

Wilson ranks 5th in school history with 133 receptions, 6th with 1,949 yards, and 2nd with 22 touchdowns.

=== College statistics ===
Season	Team	GP	Receiving				
Season	Team	GP	Rec	Yds	Avg	Lng	TD
2013	Mississippi State	13	26	351	13.5	59	3
2014	Mississippi State	13	47	680	14.5	44	9
2015	Mississippi State	13	60	918	15.3	48	10
Career		39	133	1,949	14.7	59	22

== Professional career ==
On January 1, 2016, Wilson declared for the 2016 NFL draft. He had drawn comparisons to Detroit Lions receiver Calvin Johnson, Carolina Panthers receiver Kelvin Benjamin, and Baltimore Ravens tight end Darren Waller. Wilson participated in the NFL Scouting Combine but went undrafted, gaining only a workout with the Chicago Bears in October of that year.

On March 20, 2018, Wilson joined the Albany Empire of the Arena Football League as a free agent, but never played a game as the team placed him on recallable reassignment a week later.

== Death ==
On January 21, 2020, Wilson was found shot to death inside his Birmingham, Alabama home. He was 25 years old. Wilson was the father of five children.
