= Nick Fitzgerald (American football) =

American football player (born 1996)

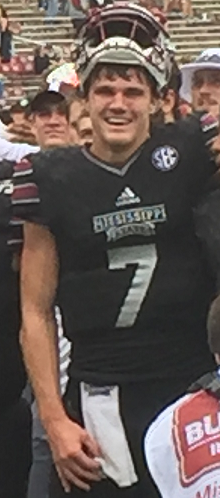
- Fitzgerald with Mississippi State in 2017

No. 7, 4
- Position: Quarterback

Personal information
- Born: January 14, 1996 (age 30); Richmond Hill, Georgia, U.S.
- Listed height: 6 ft 5 in (1.96 m)
- Listed weight: 226 lb (103 kg)

Career information
- High school: Richmond Hill
- College: Mississippi State (2014–2018)
- NFL draft: 2019: undrafted

Career history
- Tampa Bay Buccaneers (2019)*; St. Louis BattleHawks (2020); TSL Sea Lions (2021)
- * Offseason or practice squad member only
- Stats at Pro Football Reference

Nicholas Dylan Fitzgerald (born January 14, 1996) is an American former football quarterback. He played college football for the Mississippi State Bulldogs.

== Early life ==
Fitzgerald attended Richmond Hill High School in Richmond Hill, Georgia, where he played in a triple option system. Fitzgerald was rated as a three-star recruit by 247sports.com, and ESPN. He committed to Mississippi State on June 23, 2013.

== College career ==
=== Freshman season ===
Fitzgerald enrolled at Mississippi State University in January 2014 and sat out the 2014 season as a redshirt. In 2015, Fitzgerald served as the primary backup for Dak Prescott, appearing in eight games and throwing and running for three touchdowns each.

Fitzgerald saw his first action of the year in a 34–16 win over Southern Miss and accounted for three touchdowns in mop-up duty in a 62–13 blowout win over Northwestern State. After Prescott was sidelined with an illness, Fitzgerald played most of the game in a 45–17 win over Troy, accounting for three more touchdowns.

=== Sophomore season ===
Fitzgerald played sparingly in the Bulldogs' 2016 season opener against South Alabama, which they lost. Fitzgerald was named the starter for the Bulldogs' second game against South Carolina, this time playing the whole game and leading the Bulldogs to a 27–14 victory, running for 195 yards in the process. Against UMass, he threw for 299 yards and also ran for 110, leading the Bulldogs to a 47–35 win. Fitzgerald had a breakout game against Samford, throwing for 417 yards and 5 touchdowns, while rushing for 119 yards and 2 touchdowns. The 5 passing touchdowns and 7 total touchdowns tied school records set by Dak Prescott, and his 536 yards of total offense were the second most in school history. The following week, Fitzgerald led the Bulldogs to an upset win over No. 4 Texas A&M, recording 391 yards of total offense and scoring 4 total touchdowns, including a 74-yard touchdown run on the Bulldogs' first offensive play. In the Egg Bowl, the Bulldogs' annual season finale against in state rival Ole Miss, Fitzgerald led Mississippi State to a 55–20 victory and accounted for 5 total touchdowns (3 passing 2 rushing) while setting a Mississippi State single game rushing record with 258 yards.

=== Junior season ===
Fitzgerald was 159 of 286 passing for 1782 yards and 15 passing touchdowns in the 2017 season. Fitzgerald had 162 carries for 984 yards and 14 rushing touchdowns. In the 2017 Egg Bowl on November 23rd, with 9:08 remaining in the first quarter, Fitzgerald suffered an ankle injury ending his 2017 season.

=== Senior season ===
Fitzgerald started the 2018 season with 313 yards of total offense against Kansas State and 350 yards and six touchdowns against Louisiana–Lafayette. In an October 6, 2018 game against Auburn, Fitzgerald became the all time leader in rushing yards by an SEC QB gaining 195 yards on 28 carries. Late in the 4th quarter of a victory over Texas A&M on October 27, 2018, Fitzgerald tied Anthony Dixon for the school record with his 42nd career rushing touchdown. He was also named the SEC player of the week for a school record sixth time.

=== College statistics ===
Year	Team	G	Passing						Rushing				Receiving				Total offense	
Year	Team	G	Cmp	Att	Pct	Yds	TD	Int	Att	Yds	Avg	TD	Rec	Yds	Avg	TD	TOFF	TDR
2015	Mississippi State	8	11	14	78.6	235	3	0	23	127	5.5	3	0	0	0	0	362	6
2016	Mississippi State	13	196	361	54.3	2,423	21	10	195	1,385	7.1	16	1	9	9	0	3,798	37
2017	Mississippi State	12	159	286	55.6	1,782	15	11	162	984	6.1	14	0	0	0	0	2,766	29
2018	Mississippi State	12	145	281	51.6	1,767	16	9	221	1,121	5.1	13	0	0	0	0	2,633	27
Career		43	497	910	54.6	6,055	54	28	581	3,504	6.0	46	1	9	9	0	9,559	99

== Professional career ==
Pre-draft measurables
Height	Weight	Arm length	Hand span	40-yard dash	10-yard split	20-yard split	20-yard shuttle	Three-cone drill	Vertical jump	Broad jump
6 ft 4 5/8 in (1.95 m)	226 lb (103 kg)	31 7/8 in (0.81 m)	9 3/4 in (0.25 m)	4.64 s	1.62 s	2.73 s	4.56 s	7.42 s	29.5 in (0.75 m)	9 ft 7 in (2.92 m)
All values from NFL Combine/Pro Day

Fitzgerald signed with the Tampa Bay Buccaneers as an undrafted free agent following the 2019 NFL draft. On August 31, 2019, Fitzgerald was waived by the Buccaneers and was signed to the practice squad the next day. He was released on October 8, 2019.

Fitzgerald signed with the St. Louis BattleHawks of the XFL on January 18, 2020. He had his contract terminated when the league suspended operations on April 10, 2020.

Fitzgerald signed with the Sea Lions of The Spring League in 2021.

== See also ==
- Mississippi State Bulldogs football statistical leaders
