= John Bond (quarterback) =

American gridiron football player (born 1961)

No. 13
- Position: Quarterback

Personal information
- Born: March 19, 1961 (age 65)

Career information
- High school: Valdosta (Valdosta, Georgia)
- College: Mississippi State
- Supplemental draft: 1984: 3rd round, 77th overall pick

Career history
- Saskatchewan Roughriders (1984)*; Cleveland Browns (1984)*
- * Offseason or practice squad member only

Awards and highlights
- 1980 Sun Bowl (L 17–31); 1981 Hall of Fame Classic MVP (W 10–0)

Andrew John Bond II (born March 19, 1961) is an American former football quarterback. He played college football as the starting quarterback for the Mississippi State Bulldogs in 1980, 1981, 1982, and 1983. He played in the wishbone offense under head coach Emory Bellard.

== College career ==
Bond's college career at Mississippi State University included a 6–3 win over Alabama in 1980, a game considered by some Bulldog fans to be one of the greatest in school history. In addition, Bond is the only quarterback in college football history to beat LSU four times., and he was also named the MVP of the 1981 Hall of Fame Bowl.

Bond is fourth in total offense on the Bulldogs' career list with 6,901 (4,621 passing and 2,280 rushing). Bond's career rushing total was an SEC record for a quarterback until 2004, when it was eclipsed by Matt Jones of Arkansas.

=== College statistics ===
Year	Team	G	Passing							Rushing			Total offense	
Year	Team	G	CMP	ATT	CMP%	YDS	TD	INT	RAT	ATT	YDS	TD	TOFF	TDR
1980	Mississippi State	11	59	133	44.4	849	5	6	101.4	131	720	5	1,569	10
1981	Mississippi State	12	65	144	45.1	875	4	8	94.2	133	339	2	1,214	6
1982	Mississippi State	11	91	183	49.7	1,591	7	11	123.4	144	609	4	2,200	11
1983	Mississippi State	11	92	205	44.9	1,306	2	12	89.9	164	612	13	1,918	15
Totals		45	307	665	46.2	4,621	18	37	102.3	572	2,280	24	6,901	42

== Professional career ==
After college, Bond signed with the Saskatchewan Roughriders in 1984 but did not appear in any games. He was then drafted by the Cleveland Browns in the third round of the 1984 NFL Supplemental Draft of USFL and CFL players.

== Later life ==
In 2010, Bond played a role in the Cam Newton eligibility controversy. Bond reported that in 2009, former Mississippi State player Kenny Rogers told him that it would take $120,000 to $180,000 to have Newton commit to the Bulldogs. Bond reported this information to the Mississippi State athletic department, who reported it to the SEC. Newton eventually signed with Auburn

In May 2018 he was named head football coach at St. Joseph Catholic School in Madison, Mississippi. He remained in the position for four seasons, earning an overall won-loss record of 17–29; his stint as a head coach ended soon after the 2021 season.
