= Jameon Lewis =

American football player (born 1991)

No. 4, 16
- Position: Wide receiver

Personal information
- Born: November 26, 1991 (age 34)
- Listed height: 5 ft 9 in (1.75 m)
- Listed weight: 187 lb (85 kg)

Career information
- High school: Tylertown (MS)
- College: Mississippi State
- NFL draft: 2015: undrafted

Career history
- Toronto Argonauts (2016); Albany Empire (2018)*; Arizona Rattlers (2019)*
- * Offseason or practice squad member only

Jameon Kalchevis Lewis (born November 26, 1991) is an American former football wide receiver. He played college football at Mississippi State.

== Early life ==
Lewis attended Tylertown High School in Tylertown, Mississippi, where he helped lead his team to the Mississippi 3A State Championship. As the starting quarterback, Lewis only lost 4 games from his sophomore to senior year. Lewis led the chiefs to back to back State Championships appearance, winning his final year.

Lewis was rated as a three-star recruit by 247sports.com and Rivals.com.He was also rated no. 24 top prospects in MS regardless of position. Listed on the Jackson (Miss.) Clarion Ledger's 40 most wanted recruits. One of the two quarterbacks chosen for the Mississippi-Alabama all star game roster.

== College career ==
=== Freshman and sophomore seasons ===
After redshirting in 2010 season, Lewis caught 4 passes for 113 yards in his first college game, a 59–14 over Memphis. He caught only three more passes in the 2011 season. Lewis would play in all 13 games in 2012, recording 10 catches.

=== Junior season (2013) ===
Lewis had a breakout year in 2013. In a 62–7 win over Troy, he recorded a passing, rushing, and receiving touchdown. He had his first 100-yard receiving game in 59–26 loss to LSU, and also recorded touchdown passes in games against Kentucky (a game in which he repeated the feat of throwing, catching, and running in a touchdown) and Texas A&M.

In the 2013 Liberty Bowl against Rice, Lewis set a school single-game record with 220 receiving yards, bringing his season total to 923, the fourth-most single-season yards by a receiver in school history.

=== Senior season (2014) ===
Lewis threw his fourth career pass (also his fourth career touchdown pass) against South Alabama. He missed several games during the season with a leg injury but caught enough passes to rank 8th on the Bulldogs' career leaderboards in receptions and 10th in yards at the time.

=== Statistics ===
			Receiving					Passing			Rushing			Punt returns			Kickoff returns		
Year	Games	Team	Rec	Yds	Avg	Lng	TD	C-A	Yds	TD	Att	Yds	TD	PR	Yds	TD	KR	Yds	TD
2011	Mississippi State	13	7	143	20.4	80	1	0-0	0	0	11	86	1	4	10	0	22	386	0
2012	Mississippi State	13	10	108	10.8	21	0	0-0	0	0	5	21	0	2	11	0	20	517	1
2013	Mississippi State	13	64	923	14.4	65	5	3-3	84	3	13	117	3	23	51	0	20	446	0
2014	Mississippi State	9	32	380	11.9	74	2	1-1	24	1	7	56	0	2	5	0	3	65	0
Career		48	113	1,554	13.8	74	8	4-4	108	4	36	280	4	31	77	0	65	1,414	1

== Professional career ==
Lewis was signed to the Toronto Argonauts practice squad in October 2016. He was re-signed by the team in December. Lewis was waived after mini-camp in 2017.

On March 22, 2018, Lewis was assigned to the Albany Empire. On April 7, 2018, he was placed on reassignment.
