= Richie Brown =

American football player (born 1994)

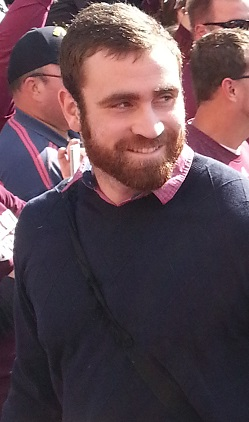
- Brown in 2014

No. 39, 44
- Position: Linebacker

Personal information
- Born: April 15, 1994 (age 32); Long Beach, Mississippi, U.S.
- Listed height: 6 ft 2 in (1.88 m)
- Listed weight: 225 lb (102 kg)

Career information
- High school: Long Beach (Long Beach, Mississippi)
- College: Mississippi State
- NFL draft: 2017: undrafted

Career history
- Tampa Bay Buccaneers (2017)*; Carolina Panthers (2017–2018)*; Atlanta Falcons (2018–2019)
- * Offseason or practice squad member only
- B/BrowRy00.htm Stats at Pro Football Reference

Richard Brown, Jr. (born April 15, 1994) is an American former football linebacker. He played college football for Mississippi State, leading the team in tackles as the starting middle linebacker in 2015 and 2016.

== Professional career ==
=== Tampa Bay Buccaneers ===
Brown was signed by the Tampa Bay Buccaneers as an undrafted free agent on May 1, 2017. He was waived on September 2, 2017.

=== Carolina Panthers ===
On December 5, 2017, Brown was signed to the Carolina Panthers' practice squad. He signed a reserve/future contract with the Panthers on January 8, 2018.

On August 31, 2018, Brown was waived by the Panthers.

=== Atlanta Falcons ===
On September 25, 2018, Brown was signed to the Atlanta Falcons' practice squad. He was released on October 18, 2018.

On July 26, 2019, Brown was re-signed by the Falcons. He was waived/injured on August 31, 2019 and placed on injured reserve. He was released on December 20, 2019.
