= 2011 Gator Bowl =

2011 Progressive Gator Bowl
- 66th Gator Bowl
Mississippi State Bulldogs	Michigan Wolverines
(8–4)	(7–5)
SEC	Big Ten
52	14
Head coach: Dan Mullen	Head coach: Rich Rodriguez
AP / Coaches / BCS; 21 / 22 / 21
	1	2	3	4	Total
Mississippi State	10	21	14	7	52
Michigan	14	0	0	0	14
- Date: January 1, 2011
- Season: 2010
- Stadium: EverBank Field
- Location: Jacksonville, Florida
- MVP: Chris Relf (QB, Mississippi State) & Denard Robinson (QB, Michigan)
- Favorite: Miss. St. by 5
- Referee: Jerry McGinn (Big East)
- Attendance: 77,497
- Payout: US$2.75 million

United States TV coverage
- Network: ESPN2
- Announcers: Mike Patrick (play-by-play); Craig James (analyst); Todd Harris (sideline)

The 2011 Gator Bowl game was a post-season college football bowl game between the Mississippi State Bulldogs of the SEC and Michigan Wolverines of the Big Ten, and was played on January 1, 2011 (1:30 p.m. ET), at EverBank Field in Jacksonville, Florida. It was the 66th edition of the bowl game and was broadcast by ESPN2. It was the first time these two teams have ever met. After the game started fairly close, Mississippi State ultimately pulled away and routed Michigan 52–14. It was the most points ever scored by one team in the Gator Bowl, and the worst loss Michigan has ever suffered in any bowl game in its long history. Rich Rodriguez was fired by Michigan after the game, marking the beginning of the "Brady Hoke Era," as Hoke would be named Rodriguez's replacement as Michigan head coach.

Konica Minolta ended its sponsorship after the 2010 Gator Bowl game. On December 14, 2010, the Gator Bowl Association announced that Progressive Insurance would become the title sponsor for the 2011 Gator Bowl.

== Teams ==
=== Mississippi State ===
Mississippi State, like their opponent, returned to a bowl game for the first time since following the 2007 season. The Bulldogs brought the nation's 16th ranked rushing offense to the contest.

=== Michigan ===
Michigan brought its high-powered offense into the Gator Bowl along with its 7–5 record. The Wolverines were led by quarterback Denard Robinson. The sophomore helped guide an offense that ranked sixth in the FBS with an average of 500.9 yards, and he set the NCAA record for most rushing yards by a quarterback with 1,643. Robinson was named the Big Ten's Offensive MVP for his efforts. Michigan returned to a bowl game after not appearing in the postseason in 2008 and 2009. This was the Wolverines' third appearance in the Gator Bowl and first since 1991. They were 1–1 in prior Gator Bowls.

== Game summary ==
The game began as a seesaw affair between the two teams. Michigan struck first with Denard Robinson throwing a 10-yard pass to Roy Roundtree for a touchdown on the game's first drive. Mississippi State responded with a 4-yard touchdown pass from Chris Relf to Arceto Clark and a 42-yard field goal by Derek DePasquale. The field goal was the direct result of a blocked punt by Mississippi State. Michigan responded with a 27-yard touchdown reception by Martavious Odoms. After the first quarter ended, Michigan lead 14–10, but would not score any more points during the game. Mississippi State blew the game wide open in the second quarter with twenty-one points. Vick Ballard and Chris Relf both had rushing touchdowns, of two yards and one yard respectively, while Ricco Sanders also had a 15-yard touchdown reception for Mississippi State. By halftime, Mississippi State led 31–14 and showed no signs of slowing down. On the opening drive of the third quarter, Michigan's defense finally forced its first three and out, but on the subsequent drive, Brendan Gibbons missed a 35-yard field goal. The Bulldogs finished the game with twenty-one second half points. Fourteen of these came in the third quarter on two rushing touchdowns by Ballard of seven yards and one yard, while the final touchdown that made the score worse than the 1968 Ohio State-Michigan game came via a Relf 31-yard pass to Michael Carr in the fourth quarter.

The game broke several Gator Bowl records, as well as Michigan records. The twenty-four points scored in the first quarter broke the previous Gator Bowl record for most points in the first quarter, which was set in 2005 between West Virginia and Florida State. Denard Robinson finished the season with 4,272 yards of total offense, a Michigan single-season record. The game was also Michigan's worst loss in Michigan's history in a bowl game, with the previous record being a 45–17 loss to Tennessee in the 2002 Citrus Bowl. This was also Michigan's worst loss since losing 40–0 to Minnesota in 1935.

=== Scoring summary ===
Scoring summary

Quarter	Time	Drive			Team	Scoring information	Score	
Quarter	Time	Plays	Yards	TOP	Team	Scoring information	MSST	MICH
1	10:56	10	78	4:04	MICH	Roy Roundtree 10-yard touchdown reception from Denard Robinson, Brendan Gibbons kick good	0	7
1	5:31	11	79	5:25	MSST	Arceto Clark 4-yard touchdown reception from Chris Relf, Derek Depasquale kick good	7	7
1	2:23	4	4	1:22	MSST	42-yard field goal by Derek DePasquale	10	7
1	0:34	5	72	1:49	MICH	Martavious Odoms 27-yard touchdown reception from Denard Robinson, Brendan Gibbons kick good	10	14
2	11:38	10	77	3:56	MSST	Vick Ballard 2-yard touchdown run, Derek Depasquale kick good	17	14
2	6:35	12	43	4:24	MSST	Chris Relf 1-yard touchdown run, Derek Depasquale kick good	24	14
2	0:25	11	68	3:01	MSST	Ricco Sanders 15-yard touchdown reception from Chris Relf, Derek Depasquale kick good	31	14
3	6:19	14	80	5:27	MSST	Vick Ballard 1-yard touchdown run, Derek Depasquale kick good	38	14
3	0:10	2	88	5:27	MSST	Vick Ballard 7-yard touchdown run, Derek Depasquale kick good	45	14
4	10:31	5	44	2:40	MSST	Michael Carr 31-yard touchdown reception from Chris Relf, Derek Depasquale kick good	52	14
"TOP" = time of possession. For other American football terms, see Glossary of American football.							52	14

=== Statistics ===
Statistics	M-STATE	MICH
First downs	26	17
Total offense, plays - yards	81-485	66-342
Rushes-yards (net)	58-204	25-88
Passing yards (net)	281	254
Passes, Att-Comp-Int	23-18-1	41-27-1
Time of Possession	35:15	24:45
