= Willie Teal =

American football player (born 1957)

No. 37, 20
- Position: Cornerback

Personal information
- Born: December 20, 1957 (age 68); Texarkana, Texas, U.S.
- Listed height: 5 ft 10 in (1.78 m)
- Listed weight: 195 lb (88 kg)

Career information
- High school: Liberty-Eylau
- College: LSU
- NFL draft: 1980: 2nd round, 30th overall pick

Career history
- Minnesota Vikings (1980–1986); Los Angeles Raiders (1987)

Awards and highlights
- First-team All-SEC (1979); Second-team All-SEC (1978)

Career NFL statistics
- Interceptions: 15
- Fumble recoveries: 5
- Touchdowns: 2
- Stats at Pro Football Reference

Willie Teal Jr. (born December 20, 1957) is an American former professional football player who was a cornerback in the National Football League (NFL). He was selected by the Minnesota Vikings in the second round of the 1980 NFL draft. He played college football for the LSU Tigers. Teal also played for the Los Angeles Raiders.
