= Will Rogers (American football) =

American football player (born 2001)

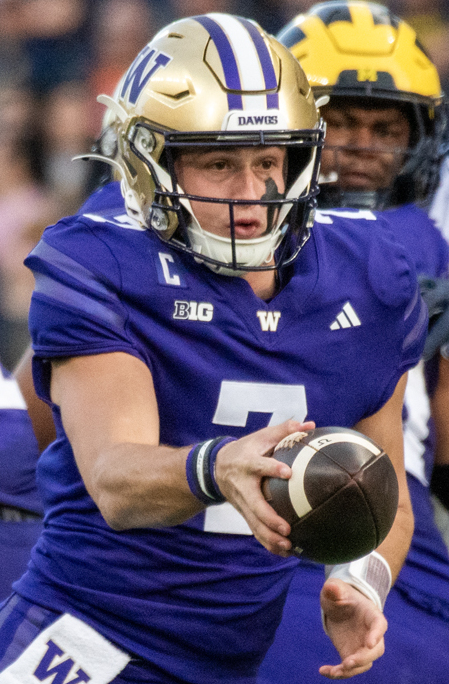
- Rogers with the Washington Huskies in 2024

Oklahoma State Cowboys
- Title: Offensive analyst

Personal information
- Born: August 19, 2001 (age 25); Louisville, Mississippi, U.S.
- Listed height: 6 ft 2 in (1.88 m)
- Listed weight: 207 lb (94 kg)

Career information
- High school: Brandon (Brandon, Mississippi)
- College: Mississippi State (2020–2023); Washington (2024)
- NFL draft: 2025: undrafted

Career history
- Oklahoma State Cowboys (2026–present) Offensive analyst
- Stats at Pro Football Reference

William Wyatt Rogers III (born August 19, 2001) is an American former professional football quarterback who is currently an offensive analyst for the Oklahoma State Cowboys. He played college football for the Washington Huskies and the Mississippi State Bulldogs. He holds Mississippi State program records in nearly every major passing category and Southeastern Conference (SEC) records for single season and career completions.

== Early life ==
Rogers was born on August 19, 2001, in Louisville, Mississippi. He spent his early years in Louisville before his family moved to Brandon, Mississippi, when he was in the seventh grade. The second of three children, his mother Judy attended the University of Alabama while his father Wyatt, a football coach, attended the University of Mississippi (Ole Miss). His paternal grandfather Bill Rogers also attended Ole Miss, playing on the school's baseball team with Archie Manning. Rogers grew up an avid fan of the Ole Miss Rebels football team, idolizing quarterbacks Eli Manning and Bo Wallace. A strong athlete, he played a variety of sports growing up, including baseball and soccer. However, he was the most passionate about football, where in elementary school he ran drills with his father's high school players. While in middle school, Rogers would be mentored by future National Football League (NFL) quarterback Gardner Minshew, whom his father coached in high school, with the two forming a bond that continued even after Minshew had left Brandon to play college football.

Rogers attended Brandon High School, where he played football under his father who served as the team's offensive coordinator. He became the team's starting quarterback as a sophomore, throwing for 2,476 yards and 18 touchdowns. In his second season as a starter, Rogers threw for 3,009 yards and 23 touchdowns, 14 of which were caught by future 2nd round draft pick Jonathan Mingo, and helped Brandon reach the state semifinals. As a senior, Rogers threw for 3,572 yards and 38 touchdowns and was named a member of the Mississippi All–Star Team.

Rogers was a 3 star prospect coming out of high school, ranked by 247Sports as the 29th best pro–style quarterback of his class. There was little mutual interest between Rogers and his childhood team of Ole Miss, as the Rebels had hired Rich Rodriguez as their offensive coordinator, whose read option offense typically utilizes a dual–threat quarterback rather than a pro–style quarterback. Rogers instead committed to play college football at Mississippi State University over an offer from Washington State, citing his relationship with Mississippi State head coach Joe Moorhead and the team's playing style as the reasons for his commitment.

College recruiting
Name	Hometown	School	Height	Weight	40^{‡}	Commit date
Will Rogers; QB	Brandon, MS	Brandon High School	6 ft 2 in (1.88 m)	200 lb (91 kg)	N/A	Jan 23, 2018
Will Rogers; QB	Recruit ratings: Rivals: 247Sports: (77)					
Overall recruit ranking:
‡ Refers to 40-yard dash; Note: In many cases, Scout, Rivals, 247Sports, On3, and ESPN may conflict in their listings of height, weight and 40 time.; In these cases, the average was taken. ESPN grades are on a 100-point scale.; Sources: "2020 Team Ranking". Rivals.com.

== College career ==
=== 2020 ===
Soon after Rogers enrolled at Mississippi State, the Bulldogs fired head coach Joe Moorhead in favor of Mike Leach, who had unsuccessfully recruited Rogers while at Washington State. In the offseason, Rogers and K. J. Costello battled to become the team's starting quarterback, with Leach ultimately deciding to start Costello for the season's first game.

Rogers made his collegiate appearance against Kentucky, replacing a largely struggling Costello. Rogers was unimpressive in his debut, throwing two interceptions, in which a 24–2 loss saw the Bulldogs throw six interceptions combined. The following week, Rogers was once again put in to relieve a struggling Costello, and threw for his first career touchdown in 28–14 loss to Texas A&M. Against the eventual national champion Alabama, Rogers replaced Costello for the third week in a row mid–game, this time due to Costello suffering a concussion. Rogers had a mediocre statistical performance against Alabama, but was praised by coach Mike Leach.

Rogers made his first career start the following week, throwing for 224 yards and a touchdown in a 24–17 win over Vanderbilt. Rogers served as the Bulldogs starter for the remainder of the season, recording a 3–3 record. His best performance of the season came in the teams Egg Bowl rivalry game against Ole Miss, throwing for a then career–high 440 yards and 3 touchdowns in a 31–24 loss.

=== 2021 ===
Rogers entered the Bulldogs 2022 campaign as the team's starting quarterback, beating out transfer Chance Lovertich for the position. In the season opener against Louisiana Tech, the Bulldogs fell behind 31–14 in the 4th quarter before Rogers led the team to three straight touchdown drives to win the game 35–34, in what was then the largest comeback in program history. Two weeks later, he threw for a season–high 419 yards on a school–record 50 completions in a 31–29 loss to Memphis. On October 2, he recorded his second 400 yard game of the season in a 26–22 upset victory over Texas A&M. For his performance against Texas A&M; he was named the SEC offensive player of the week. The following week against top five ranked Alabama, Rogers suffered an AC joint sprain but remained in the game, throwing for 300 yards, but would post his only sub–100 passer rating of the year in a 49–9 loss. On October 30, he completed 36/39 passes in a 31–17 victory over Kentucky, setting an SEC record for single game completion percentage. The following week, he once again threw for 400 yards as well as four touchdowns in a 31–28 loss to Arkansas. On November 13, Rogers would have a historic performance on the road against Auburn. After falling behind 28–3, Rogers threw for six touchdowns, setting a school record for single–game passing touchdowns and leading the Bulldog's to their largest comeback in school history, ultimately winning 43–34. In the Bulldog's final game of the regular season against Ole Miss, Rogers threw for 336 yards but the team fell to their in–state rival for the second year in a row. Rogers finished the season having thrown an SEC record 505 completions and set program records with 4,738 passing yards and 36 touchdowns.

=== 2022 ===
Rogers got off to a strong start in 2022, throwing for 450 yards and five touchdowns in the Bulldogs opening game victory over Memphis. Three weeks later he threw for 409 yards and 6 touchdowns in a blowout win against Bowling Green. On October 8, Rogers had his third 400–yard performance of the season, and broke the Southeastern Conference career completions record. In doing so he eclipsed the 921 completion mark set by Aaron Murray, despite playing in 24 fewer games than Murray. Following losses to Alabama and Kentucky, Rogers bounced back by throwing for three touchdowns in a 39–33 win over Auburn. Two weeks later, he posted a 194.0 passer rating, his highest of the season, in a blowout win over East Tennessee State. In the Bulldog's final game of the season against Ole Miss, Rogers earned his first victory against his childhood team in a 24–22 victory. Two weeks prior to the Bulldogs bowl game against the Illinois Fighting Illini, coach Mike Leach died after suffering a heart attack. Rogers would lead the Bulldogs to an emotional victory in their bowl, 19–10 dedicating the win to Leach in a postgame interview. He finished the season with 3,713 passing yards and 34 touchdowns.

=== 2023 ===
Entering the 2023 season, Rogers held Mississippi State records in career passing yards, completions and touchdowns. He started 8 games that season, going 4–4 (0–4 in the SEC), including a 487 yard performance against South Carolina. He suffered a shoulder injury that caused him to miss the other 4 games in a game against the Western Michigan Broncos, where backup QBs Mike Wright and Chris Parson would go 1–3. Rogers entered the transfer portal on November 24, 2023. On December 15, he announced that he would be transferring to Washington. On January 12, 2024, he announced he was decommiting due to Kalen DeBoer becoming the head coach at Alabama, but he later chose to remain at Washington after former Arizona head coach Jedd Fisch was hired as the head coach.

=== 2024 ===
Will Rogers would start 11 games for the Washington Huskies in 2024, throwing for 2,458 yards on 220 completions and 311 attempts, 14 touchdowns, and 7 interceptions, posting the best passer rating in his career, 147.5, his second best completion percentage, 70.7%, and his best yards per attempt, 7.9. Among these games was an upset over #10 ranked Michigan Wolverines in Week 6, where the Huskies would prevail, 27–17. He did not start in the Huskies' 2 remaining games, a loss to the Oregon Ducks in the last week of the regular season, and a loss to the Louisville Cardinals in the Sun Bowl.

=== College statistics ===
Legend
	Led NCAA Division I FBS
**Bold**	Career high

Season	Team	Games			Passing								Rushing			
Season	Team	GP	GS	Record	Cmp	Att	Pct	Yds	Avg	TD	Int	Rtg	Att	Yds	Avg	TD
2020	Mississippi State	9	6	3–3	239	346	69.1	1,976	5.7	11	7	123.5	30	−41	−1.4	**1**
2021	Mississippi State	**13**	**13**	7–6	**505**	**683**	**73.9**	**4,739**	6.9	**36**	**9**	147.0	**62**	−97	−1.6	0
2022	Mississippi State	**13**	**13**	**9–4**	415	610	68.0	3,974	6.5	35	8	139.1	44	−165	−3.8	0
2023	Mississippi State	8	8	4–4	142	237	59.9	1,626	6.9	12	4	130.9	29	**-13**	**-0.4**	**1**
2024	Washington	11	11	6–5	220	311	70.7	2,458	**7.9**	14	7	**147.5**	34	−79	−2.3	0
Career		54	51	29–22	1,521	2,187	69.5	14,773	6.8	108	35	139.4	199	-395	-2.0	2

== Professional career ==
Pre-draft measurables
Height	Weight	Arm length	Hand span	40-yard dash	10-yard split	20-yard split	20-yard shuttle	Three-cone drill	Vertical jump	Broad jump
6 ft 2 in (1.88 m)	207 lb (94 kg)	31 3/8 in (0.80 m)	8 5/8 in (0.22 m)	4.96 s	1.68 s	2.87 s	4.39 s	6.97 s	33.5 in (0.85 m)	9 ft 5 in (2.87 m)
All values from Pro Day
