= Keytaon Thompson =

American football player (born 1998)

Profile
- Position: Wide receiver

Personal information
- Born: October 23, 1998 (age 28); New Orleans, Louisiana, U.S.
- Listed height: 6 ft 4 in (1.93 m)
- Listed weight: 217 lb (98 kg)

Career information
- High school: Landry-Walker (New Orleans)
- College: Mississippi State (2017–2019); Virginia (2020–2022)
- NFL draft: 2023: undrafted

Career history
- Detroit Lions (2023)*; Orlando Guardians (2024)*; Winnipeg Blue Bombers (2024)*
- * Offseason or practice squad member only

Awards and highlights
- Second-team All-ACC (2021); Third-team All-ACC (2022)
- Stats at Pro Football Reference

Keytaon Kaylen Thompson (born October 23, 1998) is an American former professional football wide receiver. He played college football at Virginia. He previously played quarterback at Mississippi State.

== Early life ==
Thompson attended L.B. Landry College and Career Preparatory High School in New Orleans, Louisiana. He played quarterback in high school. As a senior, he was the Gatorade Football Player of the Year for Louisiana after passing for 3,825 yards with 46 touchdowns and 1,434 rushing yards with 26 touchdowns. For his career, Thompson had 10,737 yards of total offense and 149 total touchdowns. He committed to Mississippi State University to play college football.

== College career ==
Thompson played quarterback at Mississippi State from 2017 to 2019. As a true freshman in 2017, he spent the year as a backup to Nick Fitzgerald. He made his first career start in the 2017 TaxSlayer Bowl in place of an injured Fitzgerald. He led the team to victory against Louisville, completing 11 of 20 passes for 127 and rushing for 147 yards with three touchdowns. He played in nine games as a backup to Fitzgerald in 2018 and made one start. In 2019, he played in one game and took a redshirt.

Thompson transferred to the University of Virginia in 2020. He played wide receiver at Virginia. In nine games in 2020, he had seven receptions for 98 yards and three touchdowns. In 2021, Thompson started 10 of 12 games and led the team with 78 receptions for 990 yards and two touchdowns.

== Professional career ==
Pre-draft measurables
Height	Weight	Arm length	Hand span	40-yard dash	10-yard split	20-yard split	20-yard shuttle	Three-cone drill	Vertical jump	Broad jump
6 ft 3 7/8 in (1.93 m)	218 lb (99 kg)	33 3/8 in (0.85 m)	10 1/4 in (0.26 m)	4.66 s	1.66 s	2.63 s	4.35 s	7.12 s	34.5 in (0.88 m)	10 ft 0 in (3.05 m)
All values from Pro Day

=== Detroit Lions ===
Thompson was signed by the Detroit Lions as an undrafted free agent on May 12, 2023. Thompson was waived by the Lions on May 25, following the acquisition of Riley Patterson.

=== Orlando Guardians ===
The Orlando Guardians acquired Thompson's XFL playing rights on August 3, 2023. He signed with the team on October 30. The Guardians folded when the XFL and USFL merged to create the United Football League (UFL).

=== Winnipeg Blue Bombers ===
On January 30, 2024, Thompson signed with the Winnipeg Blue Bombers of the Canadian Football League (CFL). He was released on May 12, 2024.
