= 1978 All-SEC football team =

American college football all-star team

The 1978 All-SEC football team consists of American football players selected to the All-Southeastern Conference (SEC) chosen by various selectors for the 1978 NCAA Division I-A football season.

== Offensive selections ==
=== Receivers ===
- Cris Collinsworth, Florida (AP-1, UPI-1)
- Mardye McDole, Miss. St. (AP-1, UPI-1)
- Martin Cox, Vanderbilt (AP-2)

=== Tight Ends ===
- Reggie Harper, Tennessee (AP-2)

=== Tackles ===
- Robert Dugas, LSU (AP-1, UPI-1)
- Mike Barrow, Auburn (AP-1)
- Jim Bunch, Alabama (UPI-1)
- Don Swafford, Florida (AP-2)
- Tom Woodroof, Vanderbilt (AP-2)

=== Guards ===
- Mike Brock, Alabama (AP-1)
- Mack Guest, Georgia (AP-1)
- Matt Braswell, Georgia (AP-2, UPI-1)
- Dan Fowler, Kentucky (UPI-1)
- Tom Kearns, Kentucky (AP-2)

=== Centers ===
- Dwight Stephenson, Alabama (AP-1, UPI-1)
- Robert Shaw, Tennessee (AP-1)
- Jay Whitley, LSU (AP-2)

=== Quarterbacks ===
- Dave Marler, Miss. St. (AP-1, UPI-1)
- Jeff Rutledge, Alabama (AP-2)

=== Halfbacks ===
- Willie McClendon, Georgia (AP-1, UPI-1)
- Charles Alexander, LSU (College Football Hall of Fame) (AP-1, UPI-1)
- Tony Nathan, Alabama (AP-2)
- Frank Mordica, Vanderbilt (AP-2)
- James Jones, Miss. St. (AP-2)

=== Fullbacks ===
- Joe Cribbs, Auburn (AP-1, UPI-1)

== Defensive selections ==
=== Ends ===
- John Adams, LSU (AP-1, UPI-1)
- E. J. Junior, Alabama (AP-1)
- Wayne Hamilton, Alabama (UPI-1)
- Michael DuPree, Florida (AP-2)
- Lyman White, LSU (AP-2)

=== Tackles ===
- Marty Lyons, Alabama (AP-1, UPI-1)
- Frank Warren, Auburn (AP-1)
- Charlie Cage, Ole Miss (UPI-1)
- Tyrone Keys, Miss. St. (AP-2)
- George Atiyeh, LSU (AP-2)

=== Middle guards ===
- Richard Jaffe, Kentucky (AP-2, UPI-1)

=== Linebackers ===
- Barry Krauss, Alabama (AP-1, UPI-1)
- Jim Kovach, Kentucky (AP-1, UPI-1)
- Scot Brantley, Florida (AP-1, UPI-1)
- Ricky McBride, Georgia (AP-1)
- Johnie Cooks, Miss. St. (AP-2)
- David Little, Florida (AP-2)
- Randy Sittason, Vanderbilt (AP-2)

=== Backs ===
- Roland James, Tennessee (AP-1, UPI-1)
- Chris Williams, LSU (AP-1, UPI-1)
- Murray Legg, Alabama (AP-1)
- James McKinney, Auburn (UPI-1)
- Willie Teal, LSU (AP-2)
- Larry Carter, Kentucky (AP-2)
- Cliff Toney, Auburn (AP-2)

== Special teams ==
=== Kickers ===
- Berj Yepremian, Florida (AP-1)
- Rex Robinson, Georgia (AP-2, UPI-1)

=== Punters ===
- Jim Miller, Ole Miss (AP-1, UPI-1)
- Skip Johnston, Auburn (AP-2)

== Key ==
AP = Associated Press

UPI = United Press International

Bold = Consensus first-team selection by both AP and UPI

== See also ==
- 1978 College Football All-America Team
