= James Jones (running back, born 1958) =

American football player (born 1958)

No. 23
- Position: Running back

Personal information
- Born: December 6, 1958; Vicksburg, Mississippi, U.S.
- Listed height: 5 ft 10 in (1.78 m)
- Listed weight: 201 lb (91 kg)

Career information
- High school: Vicksburg
- College: Mississippi State
- NFL draft: 1980: 3rd round, 80th overall pick

Career history
- Dallas Cowboys (1980–1985)

Awards and highlights
- Second-team All-SEC (1978)

Career NFL statistics
- Rushing yards: 331
- Rushing average: 3.9
- Receptions: 42
- Receiving yards: 312
- Touchdowns: 2
- Stats at Pro Football Reference

James Jones, Jr. (born December 6, 1958) is an American former professional football player who was a running back and kick returner for the Dallas Cowboys of the National Football League (NFL). He played college football at Mississippi State Bulldogs.

== Early life ==
Jones attended Vicksburg High School, before moving on to Mississippi State University. He was a three-year starter and had a junior year to remember, when he was one of the nation's scoring leaders and received second-team All-SEC honors.

In 1978, while playing in a pass-oriented offense, he led the team in rushing with 687 yards (5.3 yards per carry) and 10 rushing touchdowns, 24 receptions for 237 yards, and 3 receiving touchdowns, completed 2 passes for 63 yards and 2 touchdowns, and had 3 two-point conversions. He was the nation's seventh leading scorer with 13 touchdowns for 78 points. Against Memphis State University, he rushed for 114 yards on 10 carries (including a 72-yard run) and scored 4 touchdowns. Against Louisiana State University, he registered 162 rushing yards (third in school history) on 30 carries.

In 1979, he was lost for the last 7 games of the year after suffering a knee injury during a 28-9 victory against the University of Tennessee.

== Professional career ==
Jones was selected by the Dallas Cowboys in the third round (80th overall) of the 1980 NFL draft. As one of Tony Dorsett's backups, he served the role of an all-purpose running back and the team's primary return specialist.

As a rookie, he set franchise records for punt returns (54) and punt return yardage (548), breaking Butch Johnson's previous marks. His 10.1-yard punt return average ranked fifth in the NFL and fourth in the NFC. It also made him the second-leading punt returner in team history. His 22 5-yard kickoff ranked sixth in the NFC.

In 1981, he had 34 carries for 183 yards and a 5.4-yard average. In 1982, he suffered a serious left knee injury that cost him 11 games, all of the next year and forced him to start the 1984 season on the Physically Unable to Perform list, after having multiple operations.

In 1984 and 1985 he returned as a situational player. He retired before the start of the 1986 training camp.

Jones totaled 1,444 kickoff return yards (20.6 average) and 736 punt return yards (8.5 average) during his career. He registered 331 rushing yards, 312 receiving yards, and 1 touchdown pass.
