= Makai Polk =

American giridion football player (born 2001)

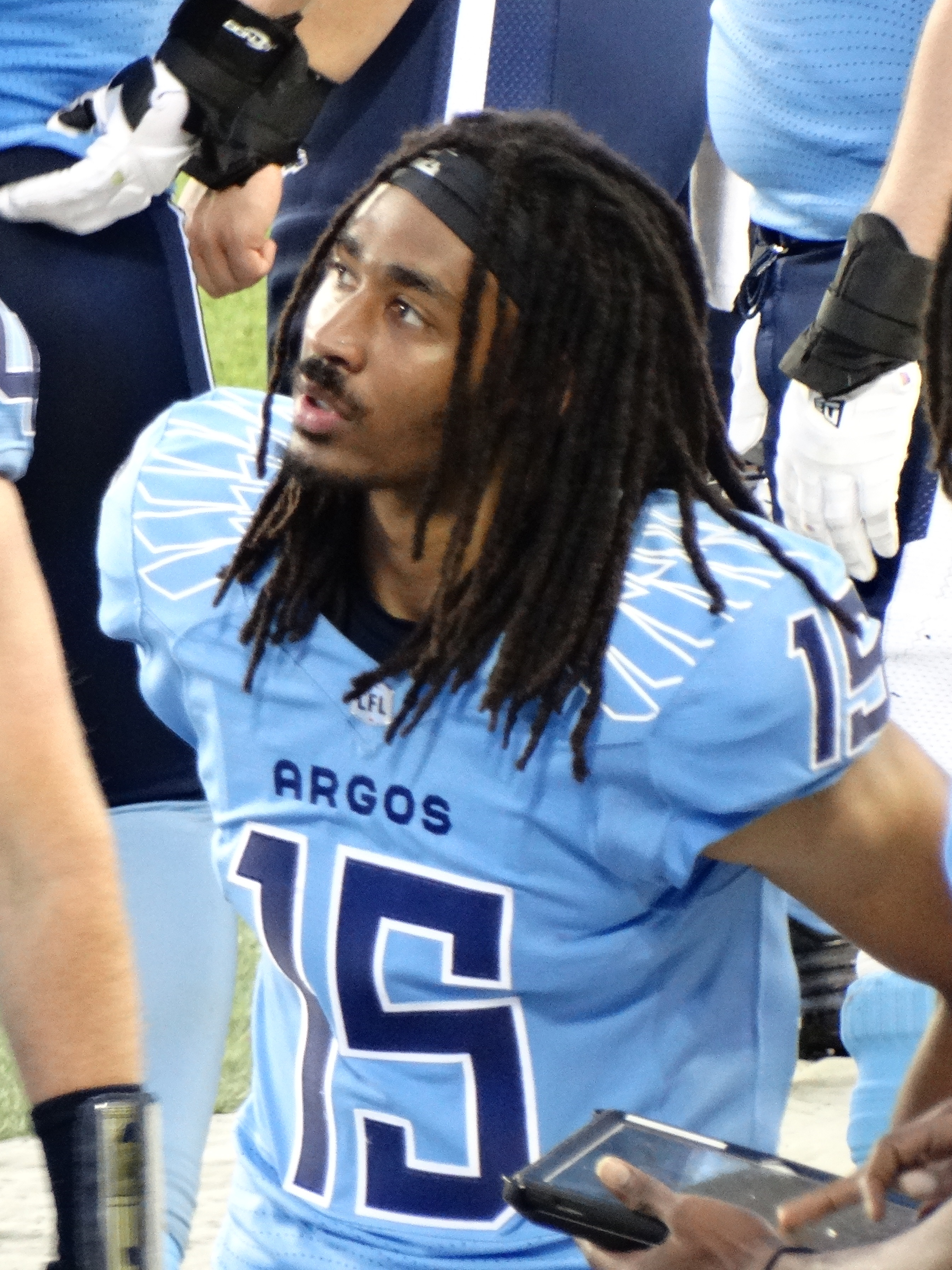
- Polk with the Toronto Argonauts in 2024

No. 15 – Toronto Argonauts
- Position: Wide receiver
- Roster status: Active
- CFL status: American

Personal information
- Born: August 4, 2001 (age 25); Richmond, California, U.S.
- Listed height: 6 ft 3 in (1.91 m)
- Listed weight: 197 lb (89 kg)

Career information
- High school: El Cerrito (El Cerrito, California)
- College: California (2019–2020); Mississippi State (2021)
- NFL draft: 2022: undrafted

Career history
- Baltimore Ravens (2022)*; New York Giants (2022–2023)*; Baltimore Ravens (2023)*; Toronto Argonauts (2024); Atlanta Falcons (2025)*; Toronto Argonauts (2025–present)
- * Offseason or practice squad member only

Awards and highlights
- Grey Cup champion (2024); CFL East All-Star (2024)

Career CFL statistics as of 2026
- Receptions: 143
- Receiving yards: 2,068
- Receiving touchdowns: 14
- Stats at CFL.ca
- Stats at Pro Football Reference

Makai Polk (born August 4, 2001) is an American professional football wide receiver for the Toronto Argonauts of the Canadian Football League (CFL). He is a Grey Cup champion after winning with the Argonauts in the 2024. He played college football for the California Golden Bears before transferring to the Mississippi State Bulldogs.

== Early life ==
Polk grew up in Richmond, California and initially attended Susan Miller Dorsey High School before transferring to El Cerrito High School before his senior year.

== College career ==
Polk began his collegiate career at the University of California, Berkeley, with the California Golden Bears. He finished his freshman season with 19 receptions for 295 yards and 2 touchdowns. Polk played in four games in the Golden Bears' COVID-19-shortened 2020 season and caught 17 passes for 183 yards and one touchdown. After the end of the season, Polk entered the transfer portal.

Polk ultimately transferred to Mississippi State University. He was named a starter going into his first season with the Bulldogs and led the Southeastern Conference with 105 receptions for 1,048 yards and nine touchdowns. Following the end of the season, he declared that he would forgo his remaining collegiate eligibility and enter the 2022 NFL draft.

== Professional career ==
Pre-draft measurables
Height	Weight	Arm length	Hand span	Wingspan	40-yard dash	10-yard split	20-yard split	20-yard shuttle	Three-cone drill	Vertical jump	Broad jump	Bench press
6 ft 3 1/8 in (1.91 m)	195 lb (88 kg)	32 1/4 in (0.82 m)	9 1/2 in (0.24 m)	6 ft 5 7/8 in (1.98 m)	4.59 s	1.55 s	2.59 s	4.34 s	7.06 s	32.5 in (0.83 m)	10 ft 0 in (3.05 m)	6 reps
All values from NFL Combine/Pro Day

=== Baltimore Ravens ===
Polk was signed as a free agent out of college by the Baltimore Ravens in May 2022, after going undrafted. He was waived on August 30, and was re-signed to the team's practice squad the following day. Polk was waived by Baltimore on September 27.

=== New York Giants ===
On September 28, 2022, Polk was signed to the practice squad of the New York Giants. He signed a reserve/future contract with New York on January 22, 2023. Polk was waived by the Giants on July 24.

=== Baltimore Ravens (second stint) ===
Polk was claimed off waivers by the Baltimore Ravens on July 25, 2023. He was waived by the Ravens on August 10.

=== Toronto Argonauts ===
On May 20, 2024, it was announced that Polk had signed with the Toronto Argonauts of the Canadian Football League. Following training camp, he made the team's Opening Day lineup, where he played and started in his first professional game on June 9 against the BC Lions; in the game, he recorded three receptions for 40 yards. Polk scored his first touchdown on June 28, against the Montreal Alouettes, on a 40-yard pass from Bryan Scott.

After being sent to the practice roster in Week 5, Polk returned to the starting lineup in the following week. He had his first 100-yard receiving game against the Ottawa Redblacks on September 7, where he had seven catches for 105 yards. He finished the season with five 100-yard games in the last seven regular season games to finish as the team's leading receiver. In 2024, Polk played in 17 regular season games where he had 61 receptions for 1,024 yards and five touchdowns. For his strong season, he was named to the East Division All-CFL team. He also played in all three post-season games registering 14 receptions for 272 yards & a touchdown, including the 111th Grey Cup where he had four receptions for 42 yards in the Argonauts' 41–24 victory over the Winnipeg Blue Bombers.

=== Atlanta Falcons ===
On January 7, 2025, Polk signed a reserve/futures contract with the Atlanta Falcons. Polk was released by the Falcons during training camp on July 31.

=== Toronto Argonauts (second stint) ===
On August 26, 2025, it was announced that Polk had signed again with the Toronto Argonauts.
