= Chris Relf =

American football player (born 1989)

No. 14
- Position: Quarterback

Personal information
- Born: May 26, 1989 (age 37); Montgomery, Alabama, U.S.
- Listed height: 6 ft 4 in (1.93 m)
- Listed weight: 240 lb (109 kg)

Career information
- High school: Carver (Montgomery)
- College: Mississippi State (2007–2011)

Awards and highlights
- 2011 Gator Bowl MVP
- Stats at ESPN

Christopher L. Relf (born May 26, 1989) is an American former college football quarterback who played for the Mississippi State Bulldogs.

== Early life ==
Relf passed for 1,400 yards and 13 touchdowns at Carver High School in Montgomery, Alabama, as a junior.

== College career ==
Had a breakout performance against Ole Miss in the season finale of the 2009 season. In the 2011 Progressive Gator Bowl against the University of Michigan Wolverines, Relf completed 18 of his 23 passes for 281 yards and 3 touchdowns. He also ran for 49 yards and 1 touchdown and was named the MVP of the game. As a senior, he led Mississippi State to the Music City Bowl where they defeated Wake Forest 23–17, marking the first back to back bowl appearances for the Bulldogs since the 1999–2000 seasons.

Relf's 3,297 passing yards are 10th in school history. His 28 passing touchdowns place him 7th.

=== Statistics ===
Season	Team	GP	Passing					Rushing		
Season	Team	GP	Cmp	Att	Yds	TD	Int	Att	Yds	TD
2007	Mississippi State	0	Redshirted							
2008	Mississippi State	2	2	9	13	0	0	7	−13	0
2009	Mississippi State	10	22	41	283	5	3	76	500	2
2010	Mississippi State	13	129	220	1,789	13	6	194	732	5
2011	Mississippi State	13	114	190	1,212	10	9	123	375	2
Career		38	267	460	3,297	28	18	401	1,578	9
