= Josh Robinson (running back) =

American football player (born 1992)

No. 34
- Position: Running back

Personal information
- Born: August 24, 1992 (age 34); Bogalusa, Louisiana, U.S.
- Listed height: 5 ft 8 in (1.73 m)
- Listed weight: 215 lb (98 kg)

Career information
- High school: Franklinton (Franklinton, Louisiana)
- College: Mississippi State (2011–2014)
- NFL draft: 2015: 6th round, 205th overall pick

Career history
- Indianapolis Colts (2015); Saskatchewan Roughriders (2016)*; The Spring League (2017); Montreal Alouettes (2018)*; Porvoon Butchers (2019)*; FCF Zappers (2022); Tulsa Oilers (2023)
- * Offseason or practice squad member only

Awards and highlights
- Second-team All-SEC (2014)

Career NFL statistics
- Rushing attempts: 17
- Rushing yards: 39
- Receptions: 6
- Receiving yards: 33
- Stats at Pro Football Reference

Joshua Devonte Robinson Sr. (born August 24, 1992) is an American former professional football player who was a running back in the National Football League (NFL). He played college football for the Mississippi State Bulldogs, and was selected by the Indianapolis Colts in the sixth round of the 2015 NFL draft.

== Early life ==
Robinson attended Franklinton High School in Franklinton, Louisiana, where he was a two-sport athlete in both football and track. He helped lead his team to the Louisiana 4A State Championship. He was picked by Louisiana Sports Writers Association to the First-team All-State 4A squad. He was named Honorable Mention on the Baton Rouge Advocate's statewide 2011 Super Dozen. As a junior, the Demons went 14–1 and fell one game short of the state championship, losing to Neville High School in the finals. He rushed for 1,315 yards and scored 22 touchdowns, while also adding 11 catches for 205 yards with five more touchdowns. He ran for 1,105 yards during his senior season with 20 touchdowns, and also caught 22 passes for 558 yards and seven more scores. Robinson also participated in varsity track, where he posted a personal-best time of 11.23 seconds in the 100-meter dash.

Considered a three-star recruit by Rivals.com, Robinson was listed as the No. 49 running back in the nation in 2011.

== College career ==
With Vick Ballard and LaDarius Perkins already established as the Bulldogs' primary running backs, Robinson redshirted the 2011 season.

In 2012, Robinson, as the primary backup to Perkins, appeared in 12 games, rushing 55 times for 335 yards and a touchdown. His biggest game was a 7-rush, 91 yard day against Northwestern in the Gator Bowl.

Robinson again backed up Perkins in 2013, appearing in all 13 games and rushing 78 times for 459 yards and 3 touchdowns. He had his first 100-yard game in the Bulldogs' 24–17 overtime win against Arkansas.

Robinson was the Bulldogs' starting running back in 2014. He rushed for a career-high 124 yards in a 47–34 win over UAB. He then eclipsed that total with 197 rushing yards in a 34–29 win over LSU, and again with 198 yards in a win over Kentucky., which is tied for the 8th most single-game rushing yards in school history. Robinson had a career-high 6 receptions and 110 receiving yards as the Bulldogs escaped an upset bid from Arkansas. Although overshadowed by teammate, Dak Prescott, Robinson was listed as a darkhorse Heisman candidate by various media outlets.

On December 31, 2014, Robinson announced he would forgo his senior season and enter the 2015 NFL draft. He completed his tenure at Mississippi State by rushing for 75 yards on 13 carries in the Bulldogs' 49–34 loss to Georgia Tech in the Orange Bowl.

== Professional career ==
Pre-draft measurables
Height	Weight	Arm length	Hand span	Wingspan	40-yard dash	10-yard split	20-yard split	20-yard shuttle	Three-cone drill	Vertical jump	Broad jump	Bench press
5 ft 7 7/8 in (1.72 m)	217 lb (98 kg)	29 3/4 in (0.76 m)	10 1/8 in (0.26 m)	5 ft 11 5/8 in (1.82 m)	4.62 s	1.66 s	2.72 s	4.58 s	7.24 s	32 in (0.81 m)	9 ft 5 in (2.87 m)	21 reps
All values from NFL Combine/Pro Day

=== Indianapolis Colts ===
Robinson was selected in the sixth round (205th overall) of the 2015 NFL draft by the Indianapolis Colts. He agreed to terms with the Colts on May 6. On November 12, 2015, Robinson was waived by the Colts due to a preseason herniated disk in his neck that interfered with his production. He was signed to the practice squad on November 13. He became a free agent after the season.

=== Saskatchewan Roughriders ===
Robinson was signed to the practice roster for the Saskatchewan Roughriders of the Canadian Football League (CFL) on September 14, 2016, but was released at the beginning of October.

=== The Spring League ===
In April 2017, Robinson participated in The Spring League, a showcase for NFL and CFL scouts during the instructional league's inaugural season. Robinson returned for the League's Summer Showcase game on July 15, during which Robinson caught a 63-yard touchdown thrown by Casey Pachall. Several days before the game, Robinson had claimed that the San Francisco 49ers would sign him soon, a transaction which did not occur. Robinson participated in a workout with the Detroit Lions in August.

=== Montreal Alouettes ===
On January 22, 2018, Robinson signed with the Montreal Alouettes of the CFL. Robinson was released before the regular season, on June 7.

=== Porvoon Butchers ===
In January 2019 Robinson signed a one-year contract to play for the Porvoon Butchers of Finland's Maple League; however, Robinson failed to show up for preseason training camp, and was cut.

=== FCF Zappers ===
Robinson played for the FCF Zappers of Fan Controlled Football in 2022.

=== Tulsa Oilers ===
On December 22, 2022, Robinson was signed by the Tulsa Oilers of the Indoor Football League. He was released on July 13, 2023.

== Career statistics ==
=== NFL ===
Year	Team	Games		Rushing					Receiving					Fumbles	
Year	Team	GP	GS	Att	Yds	Avg	Lng	TD	Rec	Yds	Avg	Lng	TD	Fum	Lost
2015	IND	5	0	17	39	2.3	8	0	6	33	5.5	9	0	1	1
Career		5	0	17	39	2.3	8	0	6	33	5.5	9	0	1	1

=== College ===
Season	Team	GP	Rushing					Receiving		
Season	Team	GP	Att	Yds	Avg	Lng	TD	Rec	Yds	TD
2012	Mississippi State	12	55	335	6.1	59	1	3	8	0
2013	Mississippi State	13	78	459	5.9	51	3	12	115	0
2014	Mississippi State	13	190	1,203	6.3	73	11	28	370	1
Career		38	323	1,997	6.2	73	15	43	493	1
