= 2014 Orange Bowl (December) =

2014 Capital One Orange Bowl
- CFP New Year's Six; 81st Orange Bowl
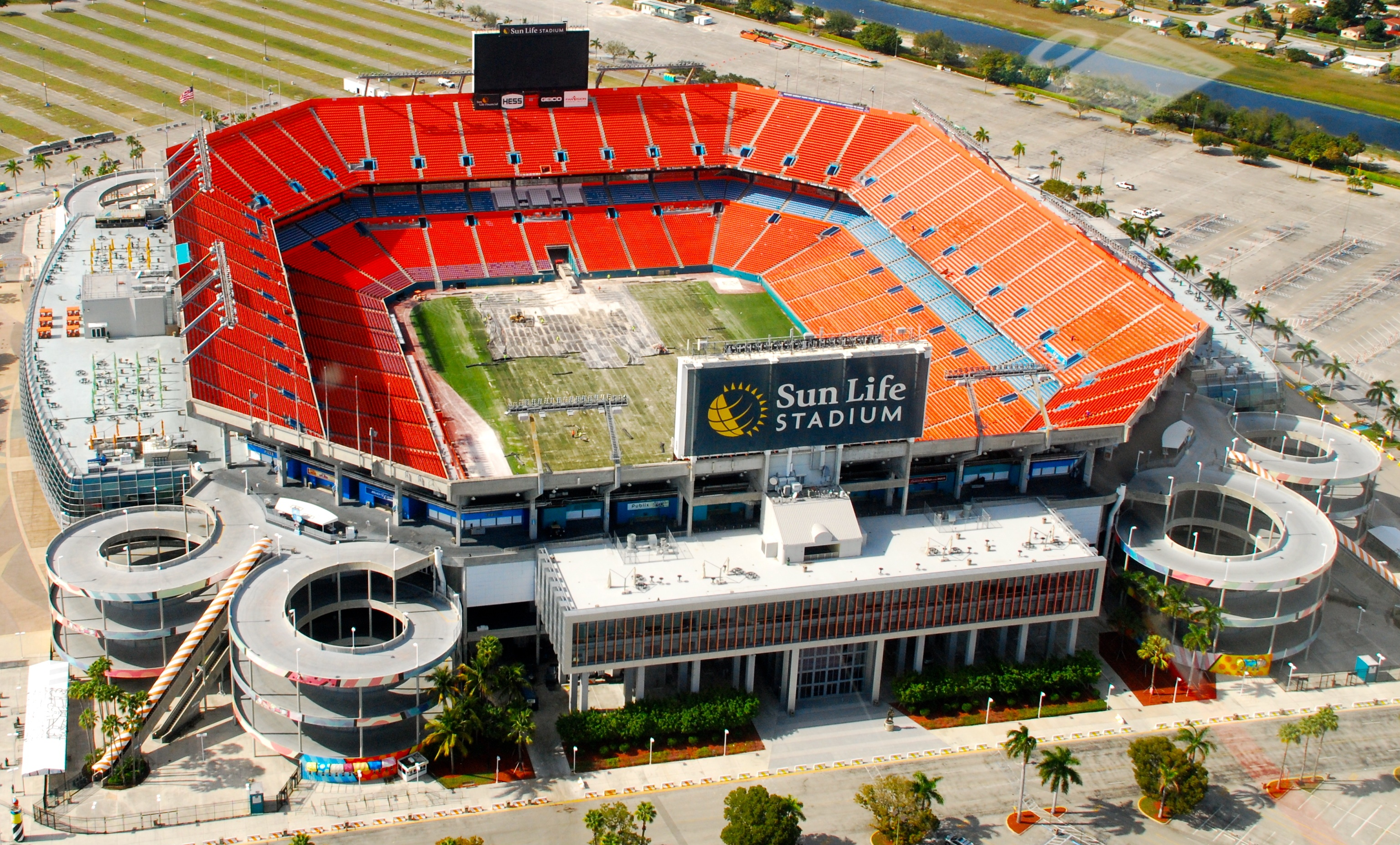
- Sun Life Stadium in Miami Gardens, Florida, hosted the Orange Bowl.
Mississippi State Bulldogs	Georgia Tech Yellow Jackets
(10–2)	(10–3)
SEC	ACC
34	49
Head coach: Dan Mullen	Head coach: Paul Johnson
AP / Coaches / CFP; 8 / 8 / 7	AP / Coaches / CFP; 10 / 9 / 12
	1	2	3	4	Total
Mississippi State	0	20	0	14	34
Georgia Tech	14	7	21	7	49
- Date: December 31, 2014
- Season: 2014
- Stadium: Sun Life Stadium
- Location: Miami Gardens, Florida
- MVP: Justin Thomas (QB, Georgia Tech)
- Favorite: Mississippi State by 6 (60)
- National anthem: Christina Grimmie
- Referee: Daniel Capron (Big Ten)
- Halftime show: Little Big Town
- Attendance: 58,211
- Payout: US$17 million (2014)

United States TV coverage
- Network: ESPN/ESPN Radio
- Announcers: Brent Musburger, Jesse Palmer, and Maria Taylor/Bill Rosinski, David Norrie, and Joe Schad

The 2014 Orange Bowl was a college football bowl game that was played on December 31, 2014, at Sun Life Stadium in Miami Gardens, Florida. The 81st Orange Bowl is a "New Year's Six Bowl" of the College Football Playoff. It was one of the 2014–15 bowl games that concluded the 2014 FBS football season.

The game was televised on ESPN and ESPN Deportes, and broadcast on ESPN Radio and XM Satellite Radio, with the kickoff time set for 8:00 p.m. ET. The game is sponsored by the Capital One financial services company and is officially named the Capital One Orange Bowl.

The Yellow Jackets defeated the Bulldogs 49–34. Georgia Tech quarterback Justin Thomas, who accounted for 4 total touchdowns, was named the game's most valuable player.

== Teams ==
The two participants for the game were the Georgia Tech Yellow Jackets vs. Mississippi State Bulldogs. Georgia Tech was ACC Coastal Division champion, whereas Mississippi State was SEC Western Division runner-up.

=== Georgia Tech ===
Georgia Tech was led by head coach Paul Johnson. Georgia Tech entered the game with a 10–3 (6–2 conference) record. Georgia Tech began the season unranked in the AP Poll and was predicted to finish 5th in the Coastal Division in the ACC Preseason Poll. The Yellow Jackets began the season 5–0 before losing back-to-back games to Duke and North Carolina. Georgia Tech ended the regular season with five straight victories, including a 30–24 overtime victory over in-state rivals Georgia, to finish first in the Coastal Division and earn a berth to the 2014 ACC Championship Game. The Yellow Jackets would lose the ACC Championship Game 35-37 to Florida State.

Georgia Tech's offense was led by quarterback Justin Thomas, who entered the game with 1594 passing yards, 965 rushing yards and 22 total touchdowns. As a team, Georgia Tech averaged 333.6 rushing yards and 135.2 passing yards per game.

This was the Yellow Jackets' seventh Orange Bowl; they had previously lost the 2010 game against Iowa, 14–24. The 2014 Orange Bowl also marked Georgia Tech's 18th consecutive bowl game appearance.

=== Mississippi State ===
Mississippi State was led by head coach Dan Mullen. Mississippi State entered the game with a 10–2 (6–2 conference) record. Mississippi State began the season unranked in the AP Poll and was predicted to finish 5th in the SEC West division. Despite starting the season unranked, the Bulldogs quickly rose to #1 on the AP Poll after victories over LSU, Texas A&M and Auburn. The Bulldogs were also ranked #1 in the first ever College Football Playoff poll. After winning their first nine games, Mississippi State suffered their first loss of the season in a 20–25 defeat to Alabama. The Bulldogs finished the regular season with a 10–2 record, losing 17–31 to their in-state rivals Mississippi in the regular season finale.

Mississippi State's offense was led by quarterback Dak Prescott, who entered the game with 2996 passing yards, 939 rushing yards and 38 total touchdowns. The Bulldogs' offense was also led by running back Josh Robinson, who entered the game with 1128 rushing yards and 11 rushing touchdowns. As a team, Mississippi State averaged 239.8 rushing yards and 266.3 passing yards per game.

This was the Bulldogs' third Orange Bowl; they had previously won the 1941 game over Georgetown 14–7. The 2014 Orange Bowl also marked Mississippi State's 5th consecutive bowl game appearance.

== Game summary ==
=== First quarter ===
The opening kickoff went for a touchback, thus Mississippi State began its opening drive at its 25-yard line. On Mississippi State's third play of the game, Dak Prescott's pass was intercepted by Chris Milton at MSU's 36-yard line. Georgia Tech took advantage of the interception, scoring first to go up 7–0 on a 3-yard touchdown run by Synjyn Days. The next Bulldogs drive, MSU was able to drive into Georgia Tech territory. However, the Bulldogs came up empty after being unable to convert a 4th and 4 at Georgia Tech's 32-yard line. After the Yellow Jackets and Bulldogs exchanged punts, Georgia Tech went up 14–0 on a 41-yard touchdown pass from Justin Thomas to Darren Waller.

=== Second quarter ===
Mississippi State finally got on the board early in the second quarter with a 32-yard field goal from Evan Sobiesk to make it a 14–3 game. After forcing Georgia Tech to punt, Mississippi State scored on a 5-yard touchdown run by Dak Prescott to make it a 14–10 game. On the following Yellow Jackets drive, Georgia Tech was able to drive into MSU's territory. However, the Yellow Jackets turned the ball over when Justin Thomas' pass was intercepted by Beniquez Brown. The Bulldogs took advantage of the interception, driving deep into Georgia Tech territory. However, Mississippi State was forced to settle for a 30-yard field goal by Evan Sobiesk to make it a 14–13 game in Georgia Tech's favor. On the ensuing Georgia Tech drive, the Yellow Jackets went up 21–13 on a 13-yard touchdown run by Justin Thomas with 29 seconds remaining in the second quarter. On the ensuing Bulldogs possession, Mississippi State was able to quickly drive to Georgia Tech's 42-yard line. On the final play of the first half, Dak Prescott completed a 42-yard Hail Mary touchdown pass to Fred Ross to make it a 21–20 game going into the half.

=== Third quarter ===
Georgia Tech scored on the second play of the second half on 69-yard touchdown run from Synjyn Days, making it a 28–20 game. After Mississippi State turned the ball over on downs, Georgia Tech went up 35–20 on a 35-yard touchdown run from Justin Thomas. On the ensuing Mississippi State drive, Dak Prescott fumbled at Georgia Tech's 48-yard line. Georgia Tech took advantage of Prescott's fumble, going up 42–20 on a 15-yard touchdown run from Justin Thomas.

=== Fourth quarter ===
Mississippi State opened the fourth quarter with a 7-yard touchdown pass from Dak Prescott to De'Runnya Wilson to make it a 42–27 game. The Bulldogs then attempted an onside kick on the ensuing kickoff. However, MSU was unable to recover the onside kick, giving Georgia Tech the ball at MSU's 46-yard line. Georgia Tech took advantage of the good field position, going up 49–27 on a 4-yard touchdown run by Synjyn Days. On the ensuing Mississippi State drive, the Bulldogs were able to drive to Georgia Tech's 5-yard line. However, the Bulldogs were unable to score when Dak Prescott's pass fell incomplete on fourth down. On the ensuing Georgia Tech possession, the Yellow Jackets went on a 9 yard play, 32-yard drive that took 5 minutes and 50 seconds off the clock. After forcing Georgia Tech to punt, Mississippi State cut into Georgia Tech's lead on a 12-yard touchdown pass from Dak Prescott to De'Runnya Wilson with 2:20 remaining in the game. Mississippi State was unable to recover their onside kick, however, and Georgia Tech was able to run out the clock.

== Scoring summary ==
Scoring summary

Quarter	Time	Drive			Team	Scoring information	Score	
Quarter	Time	Plays	Yards	TOP	Team	Scoring information	MSST	GT
1	12:38	4	36	1:27	GT	Synjyn Days 3-yard touchdown run, Harrison Butker kick good	0	7
1	1:37	9	88	1:27	GT	Darren Waller 41-yard touchdown reception from Justin Thomas, Harrison Butker kick good	0	14
2	12:57	13	60	3:40	MSST	32-yard field goal by Evan Sobiesk	3	14
2	9:53	4	55	1:07	MSST	Dak Prescott 5-yard touchdown run, Evan Sobiesk kick good	10	14
2	5:12	8	62	2:01	MSST	30-yard field goal by Evan Sobiesk	13	14
2	0:29	12	82	4:43	GT	Justin Thomas 13-yard touchdown run, Harrison Butker kick good	13	21
2	0:00	5	72	0:29	MSST	Fred Ross 42-yard touchdown reception from Dak Prescott, Evan Sobiesk kick good	20	21
3	14:05	2	75	0:55	GT	Synjyn Days 69-yard touchdown run, Harrison Butker kick good	20	28
3	7:58	7	81	3:05	GT	Justin Thomas 32-yard touchdown run, Harrison Butker kick good	20	35
3	4:17	6	52	2:24	GT	Justin Thomas 15-yard touchdown run, Harrison Butker kick good	20	42
4	14:53	13	85	4:24	MSST	De'Runnya Wilson 7-yard touchdown reception from Dak Prescott, Evan Sobiesk kick good	27	42
4	11:54	7	46	2:59	GT	Synjyn Days 4-yard touchdown run, Harrison Butker kick good	27	49
4	2:20	6	52	1:38	MSST	De'Runnya Wilson 12-yard touchdown reception from Dak Prescott, Evan Sobiesk kick good	34	49
"TOP" = time of possession. For other American football terms, see Glossary of American football.							34	49

== Statistics ==
Statistics	MSST	GT
First downs	33	26
Plays–yards	84–605	72–577
Rushes–yards	33–152	61–452
Passing yards	453	125
Passing: Comp–Att–Int	33–51–1	7–12–1
Time of possession	25:13	34:47

Georgia Tech quarterback Justin Thomas was named the game's most valuable player. Thomas completed 7 of his 12 passes for 1 touchdown, 1 interception and 125 yards. Thomas also had 121 rushing yards for 3 touchdowns.

Mississippi State outgained Georgia Tech in total yardage 605–577. Mississippi State committed 2 turnovers while Georgia Tech committed 1 turnover. The Yellow Jackets were more efficient in third down conversions; Georgia Tech converted 9 out of 13 attempts while MSU converted 6 out of 15 attempts.

Synjyn Days was Georgia Tech's leading rusher, rushing for 171 yards and 3 touchdowns. Justin Thomas was Georgia Tech's second leading rusher, rushing for 121 yards and 3 touchdowns. As a team, Georgia Tech rushed for 452 yards, an Orange Bowl record. Darren Waller was Georgia Tech's leading receiver, catching 5 passes for 114 yards and 1 touchdown.

Mississippi State quarterback Dak Prescott completed 33 of his 51 passes for 453 yards, 3 touchdowns and 1 interception. Prescott set the Orange Bowl record for passing yards with his performance. Josh Robinson was the Bulldogs' leading rusher, rushing 75 yards on 13 carries. Joe Morrow was Mississippi State's leading receiver, catching 6 passes for 117 yards. De'Runnya Wilson was MSU's second leading receiver, catching 9 passes for 105 yards and 2 touchdowns.

== Game notes ==
- The Easton Area High School Marching Band performed at the Orange Bowl as part of the pre-game show. They were the only high school performing.
- Little Big Town performed at halftime of the game.
