= Dave Marler =

American gridiron football player (born 1955)

Profile
- Position: Quarterback

Personal information
- Born: December 20, 1955 (age 70)

Career information
- College: Mississippi State
- NFL draft: 1979: 10th round, 253rd overall pick

Career history
- 1979–1982: Hamilton Tiger-Cats
- 1984: Ottawa Rough Riders

Awards and highlights
- First-team All-SEC (1978)

Career CFL statistics
- TD–INT: 16–38
- Passing yards: 3,154

David Marler (born December 20, 1955) is an American former professional football quarterback in the Canadian Football League (CFL). He played for the Hamilton Tiger-Cats and Ottawa Rough Riders. Marler played college football at Mississippi State. He was drafted by the Buffalo Bills in the 10th round of the 1979 NFL draft, but was released.

Marler started for the Tiger-Cats in the 68th Grey Cup.
