= Tommy Pharr =

American football player (born 1947)

No. 27
- Position: Defensive back

Personal information
- Born: July 31, 1947 (age 79); Canton, Georgia, U.S.
- Listed height: 5 ft 10 in (1.78 m)
- Listed weight: 187 lb (85 kg)

Career information
- High school: Cherokee (GA)
- College: Mississippi State
- NFL draft: 1970: undrafted

Career history
- Buffalo Bills (1970)

Awards and highlights
- First-team All-SEC (1968)

Career NFL statistics
- Games played: 10
- Punt returns: 23
- Return yards: 190
- Stats at Pro Football Reference

Tommy Lee Pharr (born July 31, 1947) is an American former professional football player who was a defensive back and quarterback for the Buffalo Bills of the National Football League (NFL) in 1970 and the Winnipeg Blue Bombers of the Canadian Football League from 1972 to 1974. Pharr played college football as a quarterback for the Mississippi State Bulldogs.
