= 2001 Mississippi State Bulldogs football team =

American college football season

2001 Mississippi State Bulldogs football
- Conference: Southeastern Conference
- Western Division
- Record: 3–8 (2–6 SEC)
- Head coach: Jackie Sherrill (11th season)
- Offensive coordinator: Sparky Woods (3rd season)
- Offensive scheme: Multiple I formation
- Defensive coordinator: Joe Lee Dunn (6th season)
- Base defense: 3–3 stack
- Home stadium: Davis Wade Stadium

2001 Southeastern Conference football standings
	Conf.			Overall
Team	W		L	W		L
Eastern Division
No. 4 Tennessee x	7	–	1	11	–	2
No. 3 Florida %	6	–	2	10	–	2
No. 13 South Carolina	5	–	3	9	–	3
No. 22 Georgia	5	–	3	8	–	4
Kentucky	1	–	7	2	–	9
Vanderbilt	0	–	8	2	–	9
Western Division
No. 7 LSU xy$	5	–	3	10	–	3
Auburn x	5	–	3	7	–	5
Ole Miss	4	–	4	7	–	4
Alabama	4	–	4	7	–	5
Arkansas	4	–	4	7	–	5
Mississippi State	2	–	6	3	–	8
Championship: LSU 31, Tennessee 20
$ – BCS representative as conference champion; % – BCS at-large representative; x – Division champion/co-champions; y – Championship game participant; Rankings from AP Poll

The 2001 Mississippi State Bulldogs football team represented Mississippi State University as a member of the Western Division of the Southern Conference (SEC) during the 2001 NCAA Division I-A football season. Led by 11th-year head coach Jackie Sherrill, the Bulldogs compiled an overall record of 3–8 with a mark of 2–6 in conference play, placing last out of six teams in the SEC's Western Division. Mississippi State played home games at Davis Wade Stadium in Starkville, Mississippi.

== Schedule ==
Date	Time	Opponent	Rank	Site	TV	Result	Attendance
September 3	6:00 pm	Memphis*	No. 20	Davis Wade Stadium; Starkville, MS	ESPN2	W 30–10	45,662
September 20	6:30 pm	No. 18 South Carolina	No. 17	Davis Wade Stadium; Starkville, MS	ESPN	L 14–16	43,579
September 29	2:30 pm	at No. 2 Florida	No. 21	Ben Hill Griffin Stadium; Gainesville, FL	CBS	L 0–52	85,579
October 6	6:00 pm	at Auburn		Jordan-Hare Stadium; Auburn, AL	ESPN2	L 14–16	86,063
October 13	1:30 pm	Troy State*^{†}		Davis Wade Stadium; Starkville, MS		L 9–21	26,000
October 20	8:00 pm	LSU		Davis Wade Stadium; Starkville, MS (rivalry)	ESPN2	L 0–42	45,514
November 3	1:30 pm	Kentucky		Davis Wade Stadium; Starkville, MS		W 17–14	41,433
November 10	11:30 am	at Alabama		Bryant–Denny Stadium; Tuscaloosa, AL (rivalry)	JPS	L 17–24	83,818
November 17	1:00 pm	at Arkansas		Razorback Stadium; Fayetteville, AR		L 21–24	67,314
November 22	6:30 pm	Ole Miss		Davis Wade Stadium; Starkville, MS (Egg Bowl)	ESPN	W 36–28	51,112
December 1	7:00 pm	No. 10 BYU*		Davis Wade Stadium; Starkville, MS	ESPN2	L 38–41	43,156
*Non-conference game; ^{†}Homecoming; Rankings from AP Poll released prior to the game; All times are in Central time
