= 2016 Mississippi State Bulldogs football team =

American college football season

2016 Mississippi State Bulldogs football

St. Petersburg Bowl champion

St. Petersburg Bowl, W 17–16 vs. Miami (OH)
- Conference: Southeastern Conference
- Western Division
- Record: 6–7 (3–5 SEC)
- Head coach: Dan Mullen (8th season)
- Co-offensive coordinators: Billy Gonzales (3rd season); John Hevesy (3rd season)
- Offensive scheme: Spread
- Defensive coordinator: Peter Sirmon (1st season)
- Base defense: Multiple
- Home stadium: Davis Wade Stadium

2016 Southeastern Conference football standings
	Conf.			Overall
Team	W		L	W		L
Eastern Division
No. 14 Florida x	6	–	2	9	–	4
No. 22 Tennessee	4	–	4	9	–	4
Georgia	4	–	4	8	–	5
Kentucky	4	–	4	7	–	6
South Carolina	3	–	5	6	–	7
Vanderbilt	3	–	5	6	–	7
Missouri*	2	–	6	4	–	8
Western Division
No. 2 Alabama x$^	8	–	0	14	–	1
No. 24 Auburn	5	–	3	8	–	5
No. 13 LSU	5	–	3	8	–	4
Texas A&M	4	–	4	8	–	5
Arkansas	3	–	5	7	–	6
Mississippi State	3	–	5	6	–	7
Ole Miss*	2	–	6	5	–	7
Championship: Alabama 54, Florida 16
^ – College Football Playoff participant; $ – Conference champion; x – Division champion/co-champions; * Ole Miss and Missouri vacated all wins due to NCAA violations.; Rankings from AP Poll

The 2016 Mississippi State Bulldogs football team represented Mississippi State University in the 2016 NCAA Division I FBS football season. The Bulldogs played their home games at Davis Wade Stadium in Starkville, Mississippi and competed in the Western Division of the Southeastern Conference (SEC). They were led by eighth-year head coach Dan Mullen. Despite having a 5–7 record, the first losing season since 2009, Mississippi State qualified for a bowl bid due to their high APR score. Mississippi State beat the Miami RedHawks in the St. Petersburg Bowl to finish the season at 6–7.

== Schedule ==
Mississippi State announced its 2016 football schedule on October 29, 2015. The 2016 schedule consists of six home and six away games in the regular season. The Bulldogs will host SEC foes Arkansas, Auburn, South Carolina, and Texas A&M, and will travel to Alabama, Kentucky, LSU, and Ole Miss.

The Bulldogs hosted the South Carolina Gamecocks for the first time since 2011. The team traveled to two independent schools, UMass for the first time and to BYU for the first time since 2000. Mississippi State hosted the other two non–conference games against Samford of the Southern Conference and South Alabama of the Sun Belt Conference.

Date	Time	Opponent	Site	TV	Result	Attendance
September 3	11:00 a.m.	South Alabama*	Davis Wade Stadium; Starkville, MS	SECN	L 20–21	57,075
September 10	6:00 p.m.	South Carolina	Davis Wade Stadium; Starkville, MS (SEC Nation)	ESPN2	W 27–14	57,763
September 17	6:00 p.m.	at No. 20 LSU	Tiger Stadium; Baton Rouge, LA (rivalry)	ESPN2	L 20–23	99,910
September 24	2:30 p.m.	at UMass*	Gillette Stadium; Foxborough, MA	ASN	W 47–35	13,074
October 8	11:00 a.m.	Auburn	Davis Wade Stadium; Starkville, MS	ESPN	L 14–38	60,102
October 14	9:15 p.m.	at BYU*	LaVell Edwards Stadium; Provo, UT	ESPN	L 21–28 ^{2OT}	62,184
October 22	7:30 p.m.	at Kentucky	Commonwealth Stadium; Lexington, KY (SEC Nation)	SECN	L 38–40	50,414
October 29	2:30 p.m.	No. 20 (FCS) Samford*^{†}	Davis Wade Stadium; Starkville, MS	SECN	W 56–41	58,019
November 5	11:00 a.m.	No. 7 Texas A&M	Davis Wade Stadium; Starkville, MS	SECN	W 35–28	58,407
November 12	11:00 a.m.	at No. 1 Alabama	Bryant–Denny Stadium; Tuscaloosa, AL (rivalry)	ESPN	L 3–51	101,821
November 19	6:00 p.m.	Arkansas	Davis Wade Stadium; Starkville, MS	ESPNU	L 42–58	58,538
November 26	2:30 p.m.	at Ole Miss	Vaught–Hemingway Stadium; Oxford, MS (Egg Bowl)	SECN	W 55–20	66,038
December 26	10:00 a.m.	vs. Miami (OH)*	Tropicana Field; St. Petersburg, FL (St. Petersburg Bowl)	ESPN	W 17–16	15,717
*Non-conference game; ^{†}Homecoming; Rankings from AP Poll released prior to game; All times are in Central time

Schedule source:

== Game summaries ==
=== South Alabama ===
South Alabama at Mississippi State

Team	1	2	3	4	Total
• Jaguars	0	0	7	14	21
Bulldogs	7	10	3	0	20

- Date: September 3rd
- Location: Starkville, Mississippi
- TV announcers (SECN): Dave Neal (play-by-play), Matt Stinchcomb (analyst), Olivia Harlan (sidelines)

=== South Carolina ===
South Carolina at Mississippi State

Team	1	2	3	4	Total
Gamecocks	0	0	7	7	14
• Bulldogs	7	17	0	3	27

- Date: September 10th
- Location: Starkville, Mississippi
- TV announcers (ESPN2): Mike Patrick (play-by-play), Ed Cunningham (analyst), Laura Rutledge (sidelines)

=== Louisiana State ===
Mississippi State at #20 LSU

Team	1	2	3	4	Total
Bulldogs	0	3	3	14	20
• Tigers	14	9	0	0	23

- Date: September 17th
- Location: Baton Rouge, Louisiana
- Television network: ESPN2

=== UMass ===
Mississippi State at UMass

Team	1	2	3	4	Total
• Bulldogs	3	10	28	6	47
Minutemen	7	7	7	14	35

- Date: September 24th
- Location: Foxborough, Massachusetts
- Television network: ASN

=== Auburn ===
Auburn at Mississippi State

Team	1	2	3	4	Total
• Tigers	14	21	0	3	38
Bulldogs	0	0	7	7	14

- Date: October 8th
- Location: Starkville, Mississippi
- Television network: ESPN

=== BYU ===
Mississippi State at BYU

Team	1	2	3	4	OT	Total
Bulldogs	7	7	0	0	7	21
• Cougars	7	0	0	7	14	28

- Date: October 14th
- Location: LaVell Edwards Stadium
  Provo, Utah
- Game start: 8:21 p.m. MDT
- Elapsed time: 3:47
- Game attendance: 62,184
- Game weather: 69 °F (21 °C), Cloudy, winds 12 mph SSE
- Referee: Hubert Owens • Umpire: Walt Hill • Linesman: Chad Green • Line judge: Chuck Rice • Back judge: Martin Hankins • Field judge: Greg Thomas • Side judge: Chad Hill • Center judge: Steve Marlowe
- TV announcers (ESPN/BYUtv): Tom Hart, Andre Ware, Cole Cubelic (ESPN)
  Dave McCann, Blaine Fowler, Lauren Francom (BYUtv)

=== Kentucky ===
Mississippi State at Kentucky

Team	1	2	3	4	Total
Bulldogs	0	14	10	14	38
• Wildcats	0	6	21	13	40

- Date: October 22nd
- Location: Lexington, Kentucky
- Television network: SECN

=== Samford ===
#20 (FCS) Samford at Mississippi State

Team	1	2	3	4	Total
Samford	13	7	13	8	41
• MSU	21	7	21	7	56

- Date: October 29th
- Location: Starkville, Mississippi
- Television network: SECN

=== Texas A&M ===
#7 Texas A&M at Mississippi State

Team	1	2	3	4	Total
Aggies	7	7	0	14	28
• Bulldogs	14	14	0	7	35

- Date: November 5th
- Location: Starkville, Mississippi
- Television network: SECN

=== Miami (OH) ===
2016 St. Petersburg Bowl Miami (OH) vs Mississippi State

Team	1	2	3	4	Total
RedHawks	3	6	7	0	16
• Bulldogs	0	7	7	3	17

- Date: December 26th
- Location: St. Petersburg, Florida
- Television network: ESPN
