= 2021 South Carolina Gamecocks football team =

American college football season

2021 South Carolina Gamecocks football

Duke's Mayo Bowl champion

Duke's Mayo Bowl, W 38–21 vs. North Carolina
- Conference: Southeastern Conference
- East Division
- Record: 7–6 (3–5 SEC)
- Head coach: Shane Beamer (1st season)
- Offensive coordinator: Marcus Satterfield (1st season)
- Offensive scheme: Spread
- Defensive coordinator: Clayton White (1st season)
- Base defense: 4–2–5
- Home stadium: Williams–Brice Stadium

Uniform
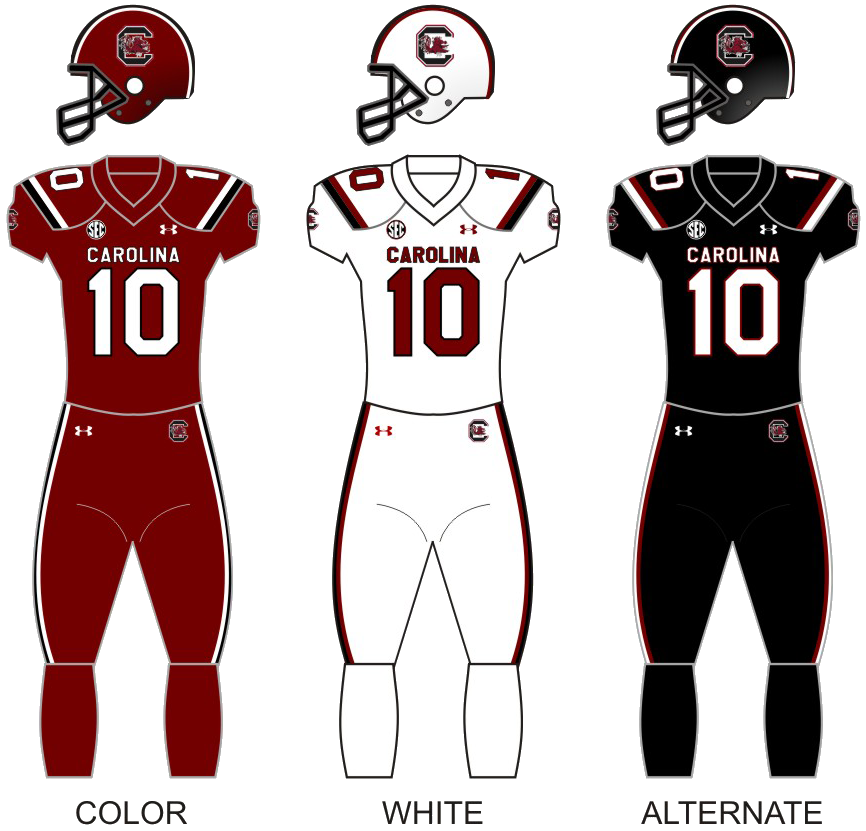

2021 Southeastern Conference football standings
	Conf.			Overall
Team	W		L	W		L
Eastern Division
No. 1 Georgia x#^	8	–	0	14	–	1
No. 18 Kentucky*	5	–	3	10	–	3
Tennessee	4	–	4	7	–	6
Missouri	3	–	5	6	–	7
South Carolina	3	–	5	7	–	6
Florida	2	–	6	6	–	7
Vanderbilt	0	–	8	2	–	10
Western Division
No. 2 Alabama x$^	7	–	1	13	–	2
No. 11 Ole Miss	6	–	2	10	–	3
No. 21 Arkansas	4	–	4	9	–	4
Mississippi State	4	–	4	7	–	6
Texas A&M	4	–	4	8	–	4
Auburn	3	–	5	6	–	7
LSU	3	–	5	6	–	7
Championship: Alabama 41, Georgia 24
# – College Football Playoff champion; ^ – College Football Playoff participant; $ – Conference champion; x – Division champion/co-champions; * – Kentucky vacated all wins due to NCAA violations.; Rankings from AP Poll

The 2021 South Carolina Gamecocks football team represented the University of South Carolina in the 2021 NCAA Division I FBS football season. The season marked the Gamecocks' 128th overall season, and 30th as a member of the SEC East Division. The Gamecocks played their home games at Williams–Brice Stadium in Columbia, South Carolina, and were led by first-year head coach Shane Beamer.

In what was later deemed 2021's best season by a first-year head coach, South Carolina compiled a record of 7–6. The Gamecocks played in their first bowl game since 2018 and won their first bowl game since 2017, defeating North Carolina in the Duke's Mayo Bowl 38–21. Home games also returned to full capacity, though that capacity was now slightly reduced due to renovations.

== Background ==
=== New head coach announced ===
On December 6, 2020, Oklahoma assistant head coach Shane Beamer was announced as the Gamecocks 36th head coach. A former Gamecock assistant coach and recruiting coordinator under Steve Spurrier from 2007 to 2010, he is also the son of long time Virginia Tech Head coach Frank Beamer. Beamer was born in Charleston, South Carolina, after graduating from Virginia Tech, he was a graduate assistant at Georgia Tech, and Tennessee, before becoming an assistant coach at Mississippi State. Beamers other stops as an assistant included Virginia Tech and Georgia. Notable recruits signed during Beamer's time as recruiting coordinator at South Carolina included Alshon Jeffery, Stephon Gilmore, and D. J. Swearinger.

Beamer cleaned out the staff from the Muschamp era, hiring Marcus Satterfield from the Carolina Panthers as Offensive coordinator and quarterbacks coach, Clayton White from NC State as Defensive coordinator and inside linebackers coach, and a slew of other hires including Pete Lembo as Associate head coach/special teams coordinator and Hammond coach and former Gamecock QB Erik Kimrey as Tight ends coach. Defensive backs coach Torrian Gray was hired away from Florida, and Wide receivers coach Justin Stepp was hired away from Arkansas.

== Preseason ==
=== Offseason departures ===
Name	Number	Pos.	Height	Weight	Year	Hometown	Note
Jaycee Horn	#1	CB	6'1	205	Junior	Alpharetta, Georgia	Declared for NFL Draft
Ernest Jones	#53	LB	6'2	230	Junior	Waycross, Georgia	Declared for NFL Draft
Shi Smith	#13	WR	5'10	190	Senior	Union, South Carolina	Declared for NFL Draft
Israel Mukuamu	#24	CB	6'4	205	Junior	Bossier City, Louisiana	Declared for NFL Draft
Ryan Hilinski	#3	QB	6'3	225	Sophomore	Orange, California	Transferred
Jay Urich	#10	QB	6'5	215	RS Junior	Greenville, South Carolina	Graduated
Collin Hill	#15	QB	6'4	222	Graduate	Moore, South Carolina	Graduated
Deshaun Fenwick	#14	RB	6'1	220	RS Sophomore	Bradenton, Florida	Transferred
Slade Carroll	#33	RB	5'9	205	RS Senior	Lexington, South Carolina	Graduated
Adam Prentice	#46	FB	6'0	245	Graduate	Fresno, California	Graduated
Christian Kinsley	#36	P	6'2	220	RS Senior	Lexington, South Carolina	Graduated
KeShawn Toney	#82	TE	6'2	248	RS Freshman	Williston, South Carolina	Transferred
Will Register	#88	TE	6'4	245	RS Junior	Chapin, South Carolina	Graduated
Sadarius Hutcherson	#50	OL	6'4	320	RS Senior	Huntingdon, Tennessee	Graduated
Keir Thomas	#5	DL	6'2	275	RS Senior	Miami, Florida	Transferred
Chandler Farrell	#31	TE	6'3	278	RS Senior	Summerville, South Carolina	Graduated
Jammie Robinson	#7	DB	5'11	195	Sophomore	Leesburg, Georgia	Transferred
Shilo Sanders	#21	DB	6'0	195	RS Freshman	Cedar Hill, Texas	Transferred
John Dixon	#22	DB	6'0	185	Sophomore	Tampa, Florida	Transferred

== Personnel ==
=== Coaching staff ===
Name	Position	Consecutive season
Shane Beamer	Head coach	1st
Marcus Satterfield	Offensive coordinator and quarterbacks coach	1st
Clayton White	Defensive coordinator and inside linebackers coach	1st
Pete Lembo	Associate head coach/special teams coordinator	1st
Torrian Gray	Defensive backs coach	1st
Montario Hardesty	Running backs coach	1st
Greg Adkins	Offensive line coach	1st
Justin Stepp	Wide receivers coach	1st
Erik Kimrey	Tight ends coach	1st
Mike Peterson	Outside linebackers coach	5th
Jimmy Lindsey	Defensive line coach	1st

=== Notable support staff ===
Name	Position	Consecutive season
Luke Day	Head strength and conditioning coach	1st
Connor Shaw	Director of football relations	1st (2nd overall)
Derrick Moore	Executive director of character and player development	1st

=== Roster ===
2021 South Carolina Gamecocks Football Roster
Quarterback: 4 Luke Doty – sophomore (6'1, 210); 8 Zeb Noland – graduate (6'2, 232); 10 Colton Gauthier – freshman (6'3, 217); 14 Connor Jordan – (redshirt) sophomore (6'4, 208); 15 Jason Brown – (redshirt) senior (6'3, 229); 28 Jake Helfrich – freshman (6'0, 190); Running back: 1 MarShawn Lloyd – (redshirt) freshman (5'9, 215); 11 ZaQuandre White – (redshirt) senior (6'1, 215); 20 Kevin Harris – sophomore (5'10, 220); 21 JuJu McDowell – freshman (5'9, 177); 22 Bruce Staley – (redshirt) freshman (5'9, 210); 23 Rashad Amos – (redshirt) freshman (6'2, 224); 26 Nathan Harris-Waynick – freshman (5'10, 210); 32 Bradley Dunn – (redshirt) freshman (5'9, 210); Wide receiver: 3 Jalen Brooks – senior (6'2, 202); 5 Dakereon Joyner – (redshirt) junior (6'1, 207); 6 Josh Vann – senior (5'11, 190); 7 Ahmarean Brown – junior (5'9, 165); 8 Randrecous Davis – (redshirt) senior (5'10, 197); 13 EJ Jenkins – (redshirt) senior (6'7, 243); 16 Trey Adkins – (redshirt) junior (5'11, 182); 17 Xavier Legette – junior (6'1, 217); 18 OrTre Smith – (redshirt) senior (6'4, 227); 19 Ben Rollins – (redshirt) freshman (5'9, 163); 24 Eriq Rice – freshman (6'1, 187); 31 O'Mega Blake – freshman (6'3, 182); 33 Sam Reynolds – freshman (5'8, 185); 48 James Bartholomew – (redshirt) senior (5'9, 180); 81 Aaron Morton – freshman (5'8, 175); 84 Rico Powers – sophomore (6'2, 187); 85 Payton Mangrum – (redshirt) freshman (6'0, 195); 86 Chad Terrell – (redshirt) senior (6'3, 222); 89 Ger-Cari Caldwell – sophomore (6'5, 200); Placekicker: 43 Parker White – (redshirt) senior (6'5, 205); 45 Alex Herrera – (redshirt) sophomore (6'0, 187); 47 Cole Hanna – (redshirt) junior (5'8, 183); 98 Mitch Jeter – sophomore (5'11, 190); Punter: 39 Kai Kroeger – sophomore (6'4, 195); 40 William Joyce – freshman (6'3, 220)	Tight end: 0 Jaheim Bell – sophomore (6'3, 230); 9 Nick Muse - Fifth Year (6'5, 249); 12 Traveon Kenion – (redshirt) sophomore (6'4, 245); 49 Dave Adams – (redshirt) freshman (6'2, 230); 80 Keveon Mullins – (redshirt) sophomore (6'3, 234); 82 Eric Shaw – sophomore (6'5, 212); 87 Patrick Reedy – (redshirt) junior (6'7, 260); 88 Jesse Sanders – (redshirt) freshman (6'3, 242); Offensive Lineman: 52 Jaylen Nichols – junior (6'5, 327); 53 Vershon Lee Sophomore (6'4, 307); 54 Jovaughn Gwyn – (redshirt) junior (6'3, 300); 55 Jakai Moore – (redshirt) sophomore (6'6, 312); 58 Mark Fox – (redshirt) sophomore (6'4, 305); 60 Jordan Davis – freshman (6'5, 302); 61 Collin Heinrich – freshman (6'3, 305); 62 Tyshon Wannamaker – (redshirt) freshman (6'4, 314); 64 JonDarius Morgan – freshman (6'3, 320); 65 Chuck Strickland – (redshirt) freshman (6'2, 267); 68 Wyatt Campbell – (redshirt) junior (6'6, 305); 70 Hank Manos – (redshirt) junior (6'4, 300); 71 Eric Douglas – (redshirt) senior (6'4, 308); 72 Trai Jones – (redshirt) freshman (6'3, 305); 74 Vincent Murphy – (redshirt) sophomore (6'2, 312); 75 Jazton Turnetine – senior (6'7, 342); 79 Dylan Wonnum – senior (6'5, 308); Defensive Lineman: 5 Rick Sandidge – senior (6'5, 302); 6 Zacch Pickens – junior (6'4, 305); 11 Keem Green – (redshirt) senior (6'4, 312); 57 Will Rogers – (redshirt) sophomore (6'4, 300); 90 T. J. Sanders – freshman (6'5, 300); 91 Tonka Hemingway – sophomore (6'3, 300); 93 Nick Barrett – freshman (6'3, 312); 94 M.J. Webb – (redshirt) senior (6'3, 310); 95 Alex Huntley – (redshirt) freshman (6'4, 305); 97 Devontae Davis – (redshirt) senior (6'4, 300); 99 Jabari Ellis – (redshirt) senior (6'3, 278)	EDGE: 1 Kingsley Enagbare – senior (6'4, 265); 3 Jordan Burch – sophomore (6'6, 268); 7 Jordan Strachan – (redshirt) senior (6'5, 250); 13 Gilber Edmond – (redshirt) freshman (6'5, 250); 15 Aaron Sterling - Fifth Year (6'2, 250); 16 Hot Rod Fitten – (redshirt) sophomore (6'2, 251); 92 Tyreek Johnson – (redshirt) sophomore (6'4, 270); Linebacker: 0 Debo Williams – (redshirt) freshman (6'1, 235); 19 Brad Johnson – (redshirt) senior (6'3, 240); 30 Damani Staley - Fifth Year (6'1, 240); 31 Bam Martin-Scott – junior (6'2, 230); 32 Mohamed Kaba – sophomore (6'2, 235); 33 Kolbe Fields – freshman (6'1, 225); 35 K.J. Scott – freshman (6'1, 220); 40 Ronnie Porter – freshman (6'1, 250); 41 Darryle Ware – freshman (6'1, 217); 42 Rosendo Louis Jr. – (redshirt) junior (6'2, 240); 44 Sherrod Greene – (redshirt) senior (6'1, 230); 45 Spencer Eason-Riddle – (redshirt) senior (6'0, 230); 48 Sean McGonigal – (redshirt) junior (6'2, 240); Defensive back: 4 Jaylin Dickerson – (redshirt) junior (6'1, 197); 8 Jahmar Brown – (redshirt) sophomore (6'1, 208); 9 Cam Smith – (redshirt) sophomore (6'1, 187); 10 R.J. Roderick – senior (6'0, 207); 12 Jaylan Foster – (redshirt) senior (5'10, 195); 14 Joey Hunter – sophomore (6'1, 200); 17 La'Dareyen Craig – freshman (6'1, 172); 18 Dominick Hill – sophomore (6'2, 200); 20 Tyrese Ross – (redshirt) junior (6'0, 200); 21 Carlins Platel – graduate (6'1, 205); 24 Marcellas Dial – (redshirt) sophomore (6'0, 190); 25 O'Donnell Fortune – (redshirt) freshman (6'1, 180); 26 Landon Grier – (redshirt) freshman (5'9, 170); 27 Isaiah Norris – junior (6'0, 170); 28 Darius Rush – (redshirt) junior (6'2, 195); 29 David Spaulding – (redshirt) sophomore (6'1, 195); 34 Cam Hardy – freshman (6'1, 190); 36 B.J. Gipson – (redshirt) sophomore (6'4, 209); 43 Joseph Byrnes – freshman (6'0, 183); 47 King-Demenian Ford – (redshirt) freshman (6'2, 207); Long snappers: 36 Hunter Rogers – (redshirt) sophomore (6'1, 197); 46 Cole Rasmussen – (redshirt) sophomore (5'11, 210); 59 Matthew Bailey – (redshirt) freshman (6'2, 210)
: 2021 South Carolina Gamecocks Football Roster 08/29/21

== Schedule ==
Date	Time	Opponent	Site	TV	Result	Attendance
September 4	7:00 p.m.	Eastern Illinois*	Williams–Brice Stadium; Columbia, SC	ESPN+/SECN+	W 46–0	64,868
September 11	12:00 p.m.	at East Carolina*	Dowdy–Ficklen Stadium; Greenville, NC	ESPN2	W 20–17	40,816
September 18	7:00 p.m.	at No. 2 Georgia	Sanford Stadium; Athens, GA (rivalry)	ESPN	L 13–40	92,746
September 25	7:00 p.m.	Kentucky	Williams–Brice Stadium; Columbia, SC (SEC Nation)	ESPN2	L 10–16 ‡	77,559
October 2	3:30 p.m.	Troy*	Williams–Brice Stadium; Columbia, SC	SECN	W 23–14	60,686
October 9	12:00 p.m.	at Tennessee	Neyland Stadium; Knoxville, TN (rivalry)	ESPN2	L 20–45	89,437
October 16	4:00 p.m.	Vanderbilt	Williams–Brice Stadium; Columbia, SC	SECN	W 21–20	64,695
October 23	7:30 p.m.	at No. 17 Texas A&M	Kyle Field; College Station, TX	SECN	L 14–44	103,889
November 6	7:30 p.m.	Florida	Williams–Brice Stadium; Columbia, SC	SECN	W 40–17	70,131
November 13	4:00 p.m.	at Missouri	Faurot Field; Columbia, MO (Mayor's Cup)	SECN	L 28–31	44,092
November 20	7:00 p.m.	Auburn	Williams–Brice Stadium; Columbia, SC	ESPN	W 21–17	70,299
November 27	7:30 p.m.	No. 23 Clemson*	Williams–Brice Stadium; Columbia, SC (rivalry)	SECN	L 0–30	79,897
December 30	11:30 a.m.	vs. North Carolina*	Bank of America Stadium; Charlotte, NC (Duke’s Mayo Bowl) (rivalry)	ESPN	W 38–21	45,520
*Non-conference game; Rankings from AP Poll released prior to the game; All times are in Eastern time

‡ As part of their penalty for NCAA violations, Kentucky has retroactively vacated its 2021 victory over South Carolina. However, the penalty to vacate victories does not result in a loss (or forfeiture) of the affected game or award a victory to the opponent, therefore South Carolina still considers the game a loss in their official records.

== Game summaries ==
=== Vs. Eastern Illinois ===
Game One – Eastern Illinois Panthers (0-1) at South Carolina Gamecocks

Quarter	1	2	3	4	Total
Eastern Illinois	0	0	0	0	0
South Carolina	15	14	3	14	46

at Williams-Brice Stadium • Columbia, South Carolina

- Date: Saturday, September 4, 2021
- Game time: 7:00 p.m. EST
- Game weather: Clear • Temperature -
- Game attendance: 64,868
- TV announcers (SECN+): Unknown
- Box Score

Game information

First quarter

- (10:23) SC – Nick Muse 4-yard pass from Zeb Noland (Nick Muse 2PT Run). South Carolina 8-0. Drive: 7 plays, 27 yards, 3:33.
- (3:25) SC – Jaheim Bell 3-yard pass from Zeb Noland (Parker White Kick). South Carolina 15-0. Drive: 10 plays, 43 yards, 5:04.

Second quarter

- (11:49) SC – Josh Vann 12-yard pass from Zeb Noland (Parker White Kick). South Carolina 22-0. Drive: 8 plays, 38 yards, 4:00.
- (0:34) SC – ZaQuandre White 10-yard pass from Zeb Noland (Parker White Kick). South Carolina 29-0. Drive: 6 plays, 52 yards, 0:59.

Third quarter

- (3:10) SC – Parker White 36-yard field goal. South Carolina 32-0. Drive: 15 plays, 66 yards, 6:12.

Fourth quarter

- (10:24) SC – ZaQuandre White 63-yard run (Mitch Jeter Kick). South Carolina 39-0. Drive: 4 plays, 86 yards, 1:51.
- (7:44) SC – Jordan Burch 61-yard interception return (Mitch Jeter Kick). South Carolina 46-0.

Statistics	EIU	SC
First downs	9	22
Plays–yards	44–109	74–439
Rushes–yards	31	254
Passing yards	78	185
Passing: comp–att–int	13–22–2	18–27–0
Turnovers		
Time of possession	25:20	34:40

Team	Category	Player	Statistics
EIU	Passing	Chris Katrenick	13/22, 78 yards, 2 INT
EIU	Rushing	Harrison Bey-Bule	5 carries, 12 yards
EIU	Receiving	Tyler Hamilton	5 receptions, 32 yards
SC	Passing	Zeb Noland	13/21, 121 yards, 4 TD
SC	Rushing	ZaQuandre White	12 carries, 128 yards, TD
SC	Receiving	ZaQuandre White	4 receptions, 39 yards, TD

=== At East Carolina ===
Game Two – South Carolina Gamecocks (1–0) at East Carolina Pirates (0-1)

Quarter	1	2	3	4	Total
South Carolina	0	7	7	6	20
East Carolina	7	7	0	3	17

at Dowdy-Ficklen Stadium • Greenville, North Carolina

- Date: Saturday, September 11, 2021
- Game time: 12:00 p.m. EST
- Game weather: Sunny • Temperature - 78 °F (26 °C)
- Game attendance: 40,816
- Referee: Alex Moore
- TV announcers (ESPN2): Brian Custer (play-by-play), Kelly Stouffer (color) and Lauren Sisler (sideline)
- Box Score

Game information

First quarter

- (14:49) ECU – Jsi Hatfield 75-yard pass from Tyler Snead (Owen Daffer Kick). East Carolina 7-0. Drive: 1 play, 75 yards, 0:11.

Second quarter

- (11:53) ECU – Holton Ahlers 3-yard run (Owen Daffer Kick). East Carolina 14-0. Drive: 2 plays, 13 yards, 0:45.
- (1:00) SC – Damani Staley 63-yard interception return (Parker White Kick). East Carolina 14-7.

Third quarter

- (0:46) SC – Dakereon Joyner 13-yard pass from Zeb Noland (Parker White Kick). Tied 14-14. Drive: 5 plays, 72 yards, 1:14.

Fourth quarter

- (8:46) ECU – Owen Daffer 26-yard field goal. East Carolina 17-14. Drive: 14 plays, 67 yards, 7:00.
- (6:46) SC – Parker White 39-yard field goal. Tied 17-17. Drive: 5 plays, 12 yards, 2:00.
- (0:00) SC – Parker White 36-yard field goal. South Carolina 20-17. Drive: 10 plays, 54 yards, 4:54.

Statistics	SC	ECU
First downs	15	12
Plays–yards	63–325	63–268
Rushes–yards	100	116
Passing yards	225	152
Passing: comp–att–int	13–24–1	12–25–2
Turnovers		
Time of possession	18:57	41:03

Team	Category	Player	Statistics
SC	Passing	Zeb Noland	13/24, 225 yards, 1 TD, 1 INT
SC	Rushing	JuJu McDowell	11 carries, 71 yards
SC	Receiving	Josh Vann	5 receptions, 127 yards
ECU	Passing	Holton Ahlers	11/24, 77 yards, 2 INT
ECU	Rushing	Rahjai Harris	14 carries, 70 yards
ECU	Receiving	Jsi Hatfield	2 receptions, 90 yards, 1 TD

=== At #2 Georgia ===
Quay Walker, linebacker with the University of Georgia Bulldogs, attempts to sack quarterback Luke Doty during a game against the South Carolina Gamecocks on September 18, 2021.

Game Three – South Carolina Gamecocks (2–0) at No. 2 Georgia Bulldogs (2–0)

Quarter	1	2	3	4	Total
South Carolina	6	0	0	7	13
No. 2 Georgia	14	12	14	0	40

at Sanford Stadium • Athens, Georgia

- Date: Saturday, September 18, 2021
- Game time: 7:10 p.m. EST
- Game weather: Mostly Cloudy • Temperature - 77 °F (25 °C) • Wind - SSE at 5MPH
- Game attendance: 92,746
- TV announcers (ESPN): Sean McDonough (play-by-play), Todd Blackledge (color) and Molly McGrath (sideline)
- Box Score

Game information

First quarter

- (12:21) UGA – James Cook 23-yard run (Jack Podlesny Kick). Georgia 7-0. Drive: 6 plays, 75 yards, 2:39.
- (8:51) SC – Parker White 37-yard field goal. Georgia 7–3. Drive: 7 plays, 56 yards, 3:30.
- (7:00) UGA – Jermaine Burton 43-yard pass from JT Daniels (Jack Podlesny Kick). Georgia 14–3. Drive: 6 plays, 75 yards, 1:51.
- (1:34) SC – Parker White 27-yard field goal. Georgia 14–6. Drive: 4 plays, 3 yards, 1:39.

Second quarter

- (6:06) UGA – Adonai Mitchell 38-yard pass from JT Daniels (Jack Podlesny Kick). Georgia 21–6. Drive: 11 plays, 90 yards, 4:36.
- (0:24) UGA – Team Safety. Georgia 23–6. Drive: 1 play, -1 yard, 0:08.
- (0:01) UGA – Jack Podlesny 36-yard field goal. Georgia 26–6. Drive: 5 plays, 39 yards, 0:24.

Third quarter

- (13:57) UGA – Zamir White 5-yard run (Jack Podlesny Kick). Georgia 33–6. Drive: 2 plays, 20 yards, 0:16.
- (7:37) UGA – James Cook 4-yard pass from JT Daniels (Jack Podlesny Kick). Georgia 40–6. Drive: 8 plays, 53 yards, 3:04.

Fourth quarter

- (10:55) SC – Josh Vann 36-yard pass from Luke Doty (Parker White Kick). Georgia 40–13. Drive: 5 plays, 46 yards, 2:01.

Statistics	SC	UGA
First downs	13	26
Plays–yards	63–296	66–491
Rushes–yards	82	184
Passing yards	214	307
Passing: comp–att–int	24–29–1	24–35–2
Turnovers		
Time of possession	31:58	28:02

Team	Category	Player	Statistics
SC	Passing	Luke Doty	13/26, 153 yards, 1 TD, 1 INT
SC	Rushing	ZaQuandre White	5 carries, 31 yards
SC	Receiving	Josh Vann	3 receptions, 128 yards, 1 TD
UGA	Passing	JT Daniels	23/31, 303 yards, 3 TD
UGA	Rushing	Kendall Milton	10 carries, 66 yards
UGA	Receiving	Adonai Mitchell	4 receptions, 77 yards, 1 TD

=== Vs. Kentucky ===
Game Four – Kentucky Wildcats (3-0) at South Carolina Gamecocks (2-1)

Quarter	1	2	3	4	Total
Kentucky	7	3	3	3	16
South Carolina	0	0	7	3	10

at Williams-Brice Stadium • Columbia, South Carolina

- Date: Saturday, September 25, 2021
- Game time: 7:00 p.m. EST
- Game weather: Sunny • Temperature - 74°F
- Game attendance: 77,559
- Referee: Justin Autrey
- TV announcers (ESPN2): Brian Custer (play-by-play), Kelly Stouffer (color) and Lauren Sisler (sideline)
- Box Score

Game information

First quarter

- (8:27) UK – Kavosiey Smoke 15-yard run (Matt Ruffolo Kick). Kentucky 7-0. Drive: 12 plays, 75 yards, 6:33.

Second quarter

- (0:00) UK – Matt Ruffolo 43-yard field goal. Kentucky 10-0. Drive: 10 plays, 57 yards, 4:39.

Third quarter

- (10:52) SC – Jalen Brooks 5-yard pass from Luke Doty (Parker White Kick). Kentucky 10-7. Drive: 10 plays, 75 yards, 4:08.
- (3:43) UK – Matt Ruffolo 21-yard field goal. Kentucky 13-7. Drive: 13 plays, 72 yards, 7:09.

Fourth quarter

- (4:26) UK – Matt Ruffolo 27-yard field goal. Kentucky 16-7. Drive: 9 plays, 51 yards, 5:17.
- (2:31) SC – Parker White 54-yard field goal. Kentucky 16-10. Drive: 5 plays, 39 yards, 1:55.

Statistics	UK	SC
First downs	22	12
Plays–yards	66–332	51–216
Rushes–yards	230	58
Passing yards	102	158
Passing: comp–att–int	15–22–1	17–25–0
Turnovers		
Time of possession	35:36	24:24

Team	Category	Player	Statistics
UK	Passing	Will Levis	15/22, 102 yards, INT
UK	Rushing	Chris Rodriguez Jr.	26 carries, 144 yards
UK	Receiving	Wan'Dale Robinson	7 receptions, 65 yards
SC	Passing	Luke Doty	17/25, 158 yards, TD
SC	Rushing	Kevin Harris	12 carries, 38 yards
SC	Receiving	Jalen Brooks	4 receptions, 63 yards, TD

=== Vs. Troy ===
Game Five – Troy Trojans (2-2) at South Carolina Gamecocks (2-2)

Quarter	1	2	3	4	Total
Troy	0	7	7	0	14
South Carolina	3	14	3	3	23

at Williams-Brice Stadium • Columbia, South Carolina

- Date: Saturday, October 2, 2021
- Game time: 3:30 p.m. EST
- Game weather: Sunny • Temperature - 84°F
- Game attendance: 60,866
- Referee: Alex Moore
- TV announcers (SEC Network): Taylor Zarzour (play-by-play), Matt Stinchcomb (color analyst), and Alyssa Lang (sideline)
- Box Score

Game information

First quarter

- (8:52) SC – Parker White 23-yard field goal. South Carolina 3-0. Drive: 15 plays, 70 yards, 6:08.

Second quarter

- (14:30) TROY – B.J. Smith 35-yard run (Brooks Buce Kick). Troy 7-3. Drive: 8 plays, 67 yards, 3:36.
- (4:12) SC – E.J. Jenkins 16-yard pass from Luke Doty (Parker White Kick). South Carolina 10-7. Drive: 10 plays, 77 yards, 4:07.
- (0:28) SC – David Spaulding 74-yard interception return (Parker White Kick). South Carolina 17-7.

Third quarter

- (11:25) TROY – Jamontez Woods 1-yard run (Brooks Buce Kick). South Carolina 17-14. Drive: 8 plays, 75 yards, 3:29.
- (4:43) SC – Parker White 48-yard field goal. South Carolina 20-14. Drive: 4 plays, -7 yards, 1:35.

Fourth quarter

- (2:20) SC – Parker White 37-yard field goal. South Carolina 23-14. Drive: 12 plays, 53 yards, 5:57.

Statistics	TROY	SC
First downs	21	19
Plays–yards	69–308	62–356
Rushes–yards	145	101
Passing yards	163	255
Passing: comp–att–int	22–38–2	20–34–0
Turnovers		
Time of possession	29:22	30:38

Team	Category	Player	Statistics
TROY	Passing	Taylor Powell	22/38, 163 yards, 2 INT
TROY	Rushing	B.J. Smith	19 carries, 102 yards, TD
TROY	Receiving	Tez Johnson	6 receptions, 49 yards
SC	Passing	Luke Doty	20/34, 255 yards, TD
SC	Rushing	Josh Vann	2 carries, 52 yards
SC	Receiving	Kevin Harris	2 receptions, 49 yards

=== At Tennessee ===
Game Six – South Carolina Gamecocks (3-2) at Tennessee Volunteers (3-2)

Quarter	1	2	3	4	Total
South Carolina	0	7	7	6	20
Tennessee	28	10	0	7	45

at Neyland Stadium • Knoxville, Tennessee

- Date: Saturday, October 9, 2021
- Game time: 12:00 p.m.. EST
- Game weather: Sunny • Temperature - 70°F
- Game attendance: 89,437
- Referee: James Carter
- TV announcers (ESPN2): Anish Shroff (play-by-play), Mike Golic Jr. (color) and Taylor McGregor (sideline)
- Box Score

Game information

First quarter

- (9:18) TENN – Jalin Hyatt 3-yard pass from Hendon Hooker (Chase McGrath Kick). Tennessee 7-0. Drive: 14 plays, 66 yards, 4:29.
- (6:46) TENN – JaVonta Payton 39-yard pass from Hendon Hooker (Chase McGrath Kick). Tennessee 14-0. Drive: 3 plays, 57 yards, 0:35.
- (0:58) TENN – Hendon Hooker 11-yard run (Chase McGrath Kick). Tennessee 21-0. Drive: 5 plays, 80 yards, 1:18.
- (0:12) TENN – Velus Jones Jr. 21-yard pass from Hendon Hooker (Chase McGrath Kick). Tennessee 28-0. Drive: 3 plays, 24 yards, 0:33.

Second quarter

- (5:40) TENN – Tiyon Evans 45-yard run (Chase McGrath Kick). Tennessee 35-0. Drive: 5 plays, 76 yards, 1:43.
- (2:04) SC – Kevin Harris 6-yard run (Parker White Kick). Tennessee 35-7. Drive: 7 plays, 75 yards, 3:36.
- (0:00) TENN – Chase McGrath 25-yard field goal. Tennessee 38-7. Drive: 11 plays, 64 yards, 2:04.

Third quarter

- (7:15) SC – Payton Mangrum 44-yard pass from Kai Kroeger (Parker White Kick). Tennessee 38-14. Drive: 7 plays, 59 yards, 3:18.

Fourth quarter

- (12:18) SC – Kevin Harris 1-yard run (2PT Pass Failed). Tennessee 38-20. Drive: 15 plays, 80 yards, 7:04.
- (4:45) TENN – Len'Neth Whitehead 2-yard run (Chase McGrath Kick). Tennessee 45-20. Drive: 6 plays, 41 yards, 3:06.

Statistics	SC	TENN
First downs	22	24
Plays–yards	75–370	72–472
Rushes–yards	153	247
Passing yards	217	225
Passing: comp–att–int	21–34–1	17–23–0
Turnovers		
Time of possession	33:55	26:05

Team	Category	Player	Statistics
SC	Passing	Luke Doty	19/31, 167 yards
SC	Rushing	Kevin Harris	16 carries, 61 yards, 2 TD
SC	Receiving	Payton Mangrum	1 reception, 44 yards, TD
TENN	Passing	Hendon Hooker	17/23, 225 yards, 3 TD
TENN	Rushing	Tiyon Evans	16 carries, 119 yards, TD
TENN	Receiving	Velus Jones Jr.	6 receptions, 103 yards, TD

=== Vs. Vanderbilt ===
Game Seven – Vanderbilt Commodores (2–4) at South Carolina Gamecocks (3-3)

Quarter	1	2	3	4	Total
Vanderbilt	3	7	7	3	20
South Carolina	14	0	0	7	21

at Williams-Brice Stadium • Columbia, South Carolina

- Date: Saturday, October 16, 2021
- Game time: 4:00 p.m. EST
- Game weather: Sunny • Temperature - 83°F • Wind: SW 14 mph
- Game attendance: 64,695
- Referee: Jason Autrey
- TV announcers (SEC Network): Dave Neal (play-by-play), Deuce McAllister (analyst) and Andraya Carter (sideline)
- Box Score

Game information

First quarter

- (9:49) SC – Nick Muse 2-yard pass from Luke Doty (Parker White Kick). South Carolina 7-0. Drive: 12 plays, 75 yards, 5:11.
- (6:03) VAN – Joseph Bulovas 42-yard field goal. South Carolina 7-3. Drive: 7 plays, 51 yards, 3:46.
- (5:07) SC – Jaheim Bell 82-yard pass from Luke Doty (Parker White Kick). South Carolina 14-3. Drive: 2 plays, 75 yards, 0:56.

Second quarter

- (2:53) VAN – Rocko Griffin 1-yard run (Joseph Bulovas Kick). South Carolina 14-10. Drive: 3 plays, 14 yards, 1:31.

Third quarter

- (5:17) VAN – Will Sheppard 52-yard pass from Mike Wright (Joseph Bulovas Kick). Vanderbilt 17-14. Drive: 8 plays, 89 yards, 3:39.

Fourth quarter

- (1:36) VAN – Joseph Bulovas 28-yard field goal. Vanderbilt 20-14. Drive: 8 plays, 38 yards, 3:32.
- (0:37) SC – Xavier Legette 9-yard pass from Zeb Noland (Parker White Kick). South Carolina 21-20. Drive: 8 plays, 75 yards, 0:59.

Statistics	VAN	SC
First downs	15	17
Plays–yards	60–312	67–434
Rushes–yards	39–106	32–117
Passing yards	206	317
Passing: comp–att–int	11–21–1	22–35–2
Turnovers		
Time of possession	31:13	28:47

Team	Category	Player	Statistics
VAN	Passing	Mike Wright	11/21, 206 yards, TD, INT
VAN	Rushing	Rocko Griffin	18 carries, 57 yards, TD
VAN	Receiving	Will Sheppard	8 receptions, 120 yards, TD
SC	Passing	Luke Doty	17/26, 242 yards, 2 TD, 2 INT
SC	Rushing	ZaQuandre White	12 carries, 65 yards
SC	Receiving	Jaheim Bell	6 receptions, 136 yards, TD

=== At No. 17 Texas A&M ===
Game Eight – South Carolina Gamecocks (4-3) at No. 17 Texas A&M Aggies (5-2)

Quarter	1	2	3	4	Total
South Carolina	0	0	0	14	14
No. 17 Texas A&M	14	17	10	3	44

at Kyle Field • College Station, Texas

- Date: Saturday, October 23, 2021
- Game time: 7:30 p.m.. EST
- Game weather: Sunny
- Game attendance: 103,889
- Referee: Steve Marlowe
- TV announcers (SEC Network): Tom Hart (play-by-play), Jordan Rodgers (analyst) and Cole Cubelic (sideline)
- Box Score

Game information

First quarter

- (12:30) TAMU – Ainias Smith 95-yard punt return (Seth Small Kick). Texas A&M 7–0.
- (0:57) TAMU – Jalen Wydermyer 25-yard pass from Zach Calzada (Seth Small Kick). Texas A&M 14–0. Drive: 10 plays, 90 yards, 4:44.

Second quarter

- (10:36) TAMU – Jalen Wydermyer 28-yard pass from Zach Calzada (Seth Small Kick). Texas A&M 21–0. Drive: 9 plays, 73 yards, 4:12.
- (8:36) TAMU – Isaiah Spiller 1-yard run (Seth Small Kick). Texas A&M 28–0. Drive: 3 plays, 6 yards, 0:40.
- (0:00) TAMU – Seth Small 32-yard field goal. Texas A&M 31–0. Drive: 14 plays, 79 yards, 7:05.

Third quarter

- (12:03) TAMU – Seth Small 28-yard field goal. Texas A&M 34–0. Drive: 9 plays, 64 yards, 2:57.
- (3:01) TAMU – De'Von Achane 35-yard run (Seth Small Kick). Texas A&M 41–0. Drive: 5 plays, 74 yards, 2:23.

Fourth quarter

- (14:54) TAMU – Seth Small 31-yard field goal. Texas A&M 44–0. Drive: 5 plays, 20 yards, 1:21.
- (12:07) SC – MarShawn Lloyd 9-yard run (Parker White Kick). Texas A&M 44–7. Drive: 7 plays, 75 yards, 2:47.
- (0:12) SC – Traevon Kenion 12-yard pass from Jason Brown (Parker White Kick). Texas A&M 44–14. Drive: 9 plays, 59 yards, 1:45.

Statistics	SC	TAMU
First downs	14	26
Plays–yards	57–185	79–477
Rushes–yards	31–71	53–290
Passing yards	114	187
Passing: comp–att–int	15–26–2	12–26–1
Turnovers		
Time of possession	24:30	35:30

Team	Category	Player	Statistics
SC	Passing	Jason Brown	8/14, 84 yards, TD, 2 INT
SC	Rushing	ZaQuandre White	8 carries, 59 yards,
SC	Receiving	Josh Vann	2 receptions, 32 yards
TAMU	Passing	Zach Calzada	12/24, 187 yards, 2 TD, INT
TAMU	Rushing	De'Von Achane	20 carries, 154 yards, TD
TAMU	Receiving	Jalen Wydermyer	4 receptions, 75 yards, 2 TD

=== Vs. Florida ===
Game Nine – Florida Gators (4–4) at South Carolina Gamecocks (4–4)

Quarter	1	2	3	4	Total
Florida	7	3	0	7	17
South Carolina	10	20	10	0	40

at Williams-Brice Stadium • Columbia, South Carolina

- Date: Saturday, November 6, 2021
- Game time: 7:30 p.m. EST
- Game weather: Cloudy • Temperature - 55°F • Wind: NE 9 mph
- Game attendance: 70,131
- Referee: Alex Moore
- TV announcers (SEC Network): Taylor Zarzour (play-by-play), Matt Stinchcomb (analyst) and Alyssa Lang (sideline)
- Box Score

Game information

First quarter

- (6:19) SC – Parker White 39-yard field goal. South Carolina 3–0. Drive: 13 plays, 65 yards, 7:02.
- (4:47) FLA – Xzavier Henderson 12-yard pass from Emory Jones (Chris Howard Kick). Florida 7–3. Drive: 5 plays, 75 yards, 1:32.
- (2:39) SC – Juju McDowell 2-yard run (Parker White Kick). South Carolina 10–7. Drive: 5 plays, 75 yards, 2:08.

Second quarter

- (14:52) FLA – Chris Howard 30-yard field goal. Tied 10–10. Drive: 6 plays, 62 yards, 2:47.
- (11:31) SC – Parker White 35-yard field goal. South Carolina 13–10. Drive: 8 plays, 58 yards, 3:15.
- (8:02) SC – Josh Vann 24-yard pass from Jason Brown (Parker White Kick). South Carolina 20–10. Drive: 4 plays, 76 yards, 2:15.
- (1:13) SC – Parker White 40-yard field goal. South Carolina 23–10. Drive: 8 plays, 62 yards, 3:47.
- (0:46) SC – Jabari Ellis 18-yard fumble recovery (Parker White Kick). South Carolina 30–10.

Third quarter

- (8:04) SC – Parker White 39-yard field goal. South Carolina 33–10. Drive: 6 plays, 46 yards, 2:15.
- (2:53) SC – Jaheim Bell 8-yard pass from Jason Brown (Parker White Kick). South Carolina 40–10. Drive: 6 plays, 32 yards, 3:08.

Fourth quarter

- (14:14) FLA – Rick Wells 9-yard pass from Emory Jones (Chris Howard Kick). South Carolina 40–17. Drive: 8 plays, 75 yards, 3:39.

Statistics	FLA	SC
First downs	13	21
Plays–yards	56–340	66–459
Rushes–yards	26–82	42–284
Passing yards	258	175
Passing: comp–att–int	17–30–1	14–24–0
Turnovers		
Time of possession	23:42	36:18

Team	Category	Player	Statistics
FLA	Passing	Emory Jones	17/30, 258 yards, 2 TD, INT
FLA	Rushing	Dameon Pierce	6 carries, 39 yards
FLA	Receiving	Justin Shorter	5 receptions, 92 yards
SC	Passing	Jason Brown	14/24, 175 yards, 2 TD
SC	Rushing	Kevin Harris	16 carries, 128 yards
SC	Receiving	Josh Vann	7 receptions, 111 yards, TD

== Rankings ==
Ranking movements Legend: — = Not ranked
	Week															
Poll	Pre	1	2	3	4	5	6	7	8	9	10	11	12	13	14	Final
AP	—	—	—	—	—	—	—	—	—	—	—	—	—	—	—	—
Coaches	—	—	—	—	—	—	—	—	—	—	—	—	—	—	—	—
CFP	Not released									—	—	—	—	—	—	Not released
