= 2021 Tennessee Volunteers football team =

American college football season

2021 Tennessee Volunteers football

Music City Bowl, L 45–48 ^{OT} vs. Purdue
- Conference: Southeastern Conference
- East Division
- Record: 7–6 (4–4 SEC)
- Head coach: Josh Heupel (1st season)
- Offensive coordinator: Alex Golesh (1st season)
- Offensive scheme: Veer and shoot
- Defensive coordinator: Tim Banks (1st season)
- Base defense: Multiple 4–3
- Home stadium: Neyland Stadium

2021 Southeastern Conference football standings
| | Conf. | | | Overall |
| Team | W | | L | W | | L |
|---|---|---|---|---|---|---|
Eastern Division
| No. 1 Georgia x#^ | 8 | – | 0 | 14 | – | 1 |
| No. 18 Kentucky* | 5 | – | 3 | 10 | – | 3 |
| Tennessee | 4 | – | 4 | 7 | – | 6 |
| Missouri | 3 | – | 5 | 6 | – | 7 |
| South Carolina | 3 | – | 5 | 7 | – | 6 |
| Florida | 2 | – | 6 | 6 | – | 7 |
| Vanderbilt | 0 | – | 8 | 2 | – | 10 |
Western Division
| No. 2 Alabama x$^ | 7 | – | 1 | 13 | – | 2 |
| No. 11 Ole Miss | 6 | – | 2 | 10 | – | 3 |
| No. 21 Arkansas | 4 | – | 4 | 9 | – | 4 |
| Mississippi State | 4 | – | 4 | 7 | – | 6 |
| Texas A&M | 4 | – | 4 | 8 | – | 4 |
| Auburn | 3 | – | 5 | 6 | – | 7 |
| LSU | 3 | – | 5 | 6 | – | 7 |
Championship: Alabama 41, Georgia 24
# – College Football Playoff champion; ^ – College Football Playoff participant; $ – Conference champion; x – Division champion/co-champions; * – Kentucky vacated all wins due to NCAA violations.; Rankings from AP Poll

The 2021 Tennessee Volunteers football team represented the University of Tennessee in the 2021 NCAA Division I FBS football season. The Volunteers played their home games at Neyland Stadium in Knoxville, Tennessee, and competed in the Eastern Division of the Southeastern Conference (SEC). They were led by first-year coach Josh Heupel.

== Recruiting class ==
| Ranking | Position | Name | Home State |
|---|---|---|---|
| ★★★★ | OT | Addison Nichols | Georgia |
| ★★★★ | QB | Tayven Jackson | Indiana |
| ★★★★ | WR | Cameron Miller | Tennessee |
| ★★★ | EDGE | Joshua Josephs | Georgia |
| ★★★ | TE | Brody Foley | Ohio |
| ★★★ | WR | Marquarius (Squirrel) White | Alabama |
| ★★★ | WR | Chas Nimrod | Arkansas |
| ★★★ | RB | Dylan Sampson | Louisiana |
| ★★★ | OG | Mo Clipper Jr. | Georgia |
| ★★★ | OT | Brian Grant | Florida |
| ★★★ | OG | Masai Reddick | Michigan |
| ★★★ | DT | Jordan Phillips | Florida |
| ★★★ | LB | Elijah Herring | Tennessee |
| ★★★ | LB | Kalib Perry | Kentucky |

== Coaching staff ==
| Name | Position | Joined staff |
|---|---|---|
| Josh Heupel | Head coach | 2021 |
| Tim Banks | Defensive coordinator | 2021 |
| Kodi Burns | Wide receivers | 2021 |
| Mike Ekeler | outside linebackers / Special teams coordinator | 2021 |
| Glen Elarbee | offensive line | 2021 |
| Rodney Garner | Defensive line | 2021 |
| Alex Golesh | Offensive coordinator / Tight Ends | 2021 |
| Joey Halzle | Quarterbacks | 2021 |
| Brian Jean-Mary | Linebackers | 2021 |
| Jerry Mack | Running Backs | 2021 |
| Willie Martinez | Secondary | 2021 |

== Schedule ==
| Date | Time | Opponent | Site | TV | Result | Attendance |
|---|---|---|---|---|---|---|
| September 2 | 8:00 p.m. | Bowling Green* | Neyland Stadium; Knoxville, TN | SECN | W 38–6 | 84,314 |
| September 11 | Noon | Pittsburgh* | Neyland Stadium; Knoxville, TN | ESPN | L 34–41 | 82,203 |
| September 18 | Noon | Tennessee Tech* | Neyland Stadium; Knoxville, TN | ESPN+/SECN+ | W 56–0 | 80,053 |
| September 25 | 7:00 p.m. | at No. 11 Florida | Ben Hill Griffin Stadium; Gainesville, FL (rivalry) | ESPN | L 14–38 | 88,478 |
| October 2 | Noon | at Missouri | Faurot Field; Columbia, MO | SECN | W 62–24 | 45,655 |
| October 9 | Noon | South Carolina | Neyland Stadium; Knoxville, TN (rivalry) | ESPN2 | W 45–20 | 89,437 |
| October 16 | 7:30 p.m. | No. 13 Ole Miss | Neyland Stadium; Knoxville, TN (rivalry) | SECN | L 26–31 | 102,455 |
| October 23 | 7:00 p.m. | at No. 4 Alabama | Bryant–Denny Stadium; Tuscaloosa, AL (Third Saturday in October) | ESPN | L 24–52 | 100,077 |
| November 6 | 7:00 p.m. | at No. 18 Kentucky | Kroger Field; Lexington, KY (rivalry) | ESPN2 | W 45–42 | 61,690 |
| November 13 | 3:30 p.m. | No. 1 Georgia^{†} | Neyland Stadium; Knoxville, TN (rivalry) | CBS | L 17–41 | 100,074 |
| November 20 | 7:30 p.m. | South Alabama* | Neyland Stadium; Knoxville, TN | ESPNU | W 60–14 | 75,203 |
| November 27 | 3:45 p.m. | Vanderbilt | Neyland Stadium; Knoxville, TN (rivalry) | SECN | W 45–21 | 77,349 |
| December 30 | 3:00 p.m. | vs. Purdue* | Nissan Stadium; Nashville, TN (Music City Bowl) | ESPN | L 45–48^{OT} | 69,489 |
*Non-conference game; ^{†}Homecoming; Rankings from AP and CFP Rankings after November 2; All times are in Eastern time

== Game summaries ==
=== Bowling Green ===
Bowling Green at Tennessee

| Quarter | 1 | 2 | 3 | 4 | Total |
|---|---|---|---|---|---|
| Bowling Green | 0 | 6 | 0 | 0 | 6 |
| Tennessee | 14 | 0 | 14 | 10 | 38 |

at Neyland Stadium, Knoxville, TN

- Date: September 2
- Game time: 8:00 p.m.
- Game weather: Sunny, 77 °F (25 °C)
- Game attendance: 84,314
- Referee: Steve Marlowe
- TV announcers (SECN): Tom Hart (play-by-play), Jordan Rodgers (color) and Cole Cubelic (sidelines)

=== Pittsburgh ===
Pittsburgh at Tennessee

| Quarter | 1 | 2 | 3 | 4 | Total |
|---|---|---|---|---|---|
| Pittsburgh | 0 | 27 | 7 | 7 | 41 |
| Tennessee | 10 | 10 | 7 | 7 | 34 |

at Neyland Stadium, Knoxville, TN

- Date: September 11
- Game time: Noon
- Game weather: Sunny, 71 °F (22 °C)
- Game attendance: 82,203
- Referee: Stuart Mullins
- TV announcers (ESPN): Dave Pasch (play-by-play), Dusty Dvoracek (color) and Tom Luginbill (sidelines)

=== Tennessee Tech ===
Tennessee Tech at Tennessee

| Quarter | 1 | 2 | 3 | 4 | Total |
|---|---|---|---|---|---|
| Tennessee Tech | 0 | 0 | 0 | 0 | 0 |
| Tennessee | 14 | 14 | 21 | 7 | 56 |

at Neyland Stadium, Knoxville, TN

- Date: September 18
- Game time: Noon
- Game weather: Sunny, 75 °F (24 °C)
- Game attendance: 80,053
- Referee: Kyle Olson
- TV announcers (SECN+/ESPN+): Kevin Brown (play-by-play), Hutson Mason (color) and Abby Labar (sidelines)

=== At No. 11 Florida ===
Tennessee at No. 11 Florida

| Quarter | 1 | 2 | 3 | 4 | Total |
|---|---|---|---|---|---|
| Tennessee | 7 | 7 | 0 | 0 | 14 |
| No. 11 Florida | 10 | 7 | 14 | 7 | 38 |

at Ben Hill Griffin Stadium, Gainesville, FL

- Date: September 25
- Game time: 7:00 p.m.
- Game weather: Cloudy, 80 °F (27 °C)
- Game attendance: 88,478
- Referee: Matt Loeffler
- TV announcers (ESPN): Joe Tessitore (play-by-play), Greg McElroy (color), and Katie George (sidelines)

Game information

First quarter

- Florida – Malik Davis 4-yard pass from Emory Jones, (Jace Christmann kick) 9:20
- Tennessee – Tiyon Evans 47-yard pass from Hendon Hooker, (Chase McGrath kick), 7:05
- Florida – Jace Christmann 47-yard field goal, 1:07

Second quarter

- Tennessee – JaVonta Payton 75-yard pass from Hendon Hooker, (Chase McGrath kick), 11:31
- Florida – Nay'Quan Wright 23-yard run, (Jace Christmann kick), 4:15

Third quarter

- Florida – Kemore Gamble 13-yard pass from Trent Whittemore, (Jace Christmann kick), 12:21
- Florida – Rick Wells 9-yard pass from Emory Jones, (Jace Christmann kick), 2:04

Fourth quarter

- Florida – Malik Davis 9-yard run, (Jace Christmann kick), 1:39

Passing leaders

- TEN – Hendon Hooker – 13/23, 221 yards, 2 touchdowns
- FLA – Emory Jones – 21/27, 209 yards, 2 touchdowns

Rushing leaders

- TEN – Jabari Smith – 11 carries, 60 yards
- FLA – Emory Jones – 15 carries, 147 yards

Receiving leaders

- TEN – JaVonta Payton – 2 receptions, 82 yards, 1 touchdown
- FLA – Justin Shorter – 3 receptions, 54 yards

Tackling leaders

- TEN – Trevon Flowers, 15 tackles
- FLA – Trey Dean, 11 tackles

=== At Missouri ===
Tennessee at Missouri

| Quarter | 1 | 2 | 3 | 4 | Total |
|---|---|---|---|---|---|
| Tennessee | 28 | 17 | 10 | 7 | 62 |
| Missouri | 3 | 7 | 7 | 7 | 24 |

at Faurot Field, Columbia, MO

- Date: October 2
- Game time: Noon
- Game weather: Rain, 72 °F (22 °C)
- Game attendance: 45,655
- Referee: David Smith
- TV announcers (SECN): Dave Neal (play-by-play), Deuce McAllister (color), and Andraya Carter (sidelines)

=== Vs. South Carolina ===
South Carolina at Tennessee

| Quarter | 1 | 2 | 3 | 4 | Total |
|---|---|---|---|---|---|
| South Carolina | 0 | 7 | 7 | 6 | 20 |
| Tennessee | 28 | 10 | 0 | 7 | 45 |

at Neyland Stadium • Knoxville, Tennessee

- Date: Saturday, October 9, 2021
- Game time: 12:00 p.m.. EST
- Game weather: Sunny • Temperature – 70°F
- Game attendance: 89,437
- Referee: James Carter
- TV announcers (ESPN2): Anish Shroff (play-by-play), Mike Golic Jr. (color) and Taylor McGregor (sideline)
- Box Score

Game information

First quarter

- (9:18) TENN – Jalin Hyatt 3-yard pass from Hendon Hooker (Chase McGrath Kick). Tennessee 7–0. Drive: 14 plays, 66 yards, 4:29.
- (6:46) TENN – JaVonta Payton 39-yard pass from Hendon Hooker (Chase McGrath Kick). Tennessee 14–0. Drive: 3 plays, 57 yards, 0:35.
- (0:58) TENN – Hendon Hooker 11-yard run (Chase McGrath Kick). Tennessee 21–0. Drive: 5 plays, 80 yards, 1:18.
- (0:12) TENN – Velus Jones Jr. 21-yard pass from Hendon Hooker (Chase McGrath Kick). Tennessee 28–0. Drive: 3 plays, 24 yards, 0:33.

Second quarter

- (5:40) TENN – Tiyon Evans 45-yard run (Chase McGrath Kick). Tennessee 35–0. Drive: 5 plays, 76 yards, 1:43.
- (2:04) SC – Kevin Harris 6-yard run (Parker White Kick). Tennessee 35–7. Drive: 7 plays, 75 yards, 3:36.
- (0:00) TENN – Chase McGrath 25-yard field goal. Tennessee 38–7. Drive: 11 plays, 64 yards, 2:04.

Third quarter

- (7:15) SC – Payton Mangrum 44-yard pass from Kai Kroeger (Parker White Kick). Tennessee 38–14. Drive: 7 plays, 59 yards, 3:18.

Fourth quarter

- (12:18) SC – Kevin Harris 1-yard run (2PT Pass Failed). Tennessee 38–20. Drive: 15 plays, 80 yards, 7:04.
- (4:45) TENN – Len'Neth Whitehead 2-yard run (Chase McGrath Kick). Tennessee 45–20. Drive: 6 plays, 41 yards, 3:06.

| Statistics | SC | TENN |
|---|---|---|
| First downs | 22 | 24 |
| Plays–yards | 75–370 | 72–472 |
| Rushes–yards | 153 | 247 |
| Passing yards | 217 | 225 |
| Passing: comp–att–int | 21–34–1 | 17–23–0 |
| Time of possession | 33:55 | 26:05 |

| Team | Category | Player | Statistics |
|---|---|---|---|
| SC | Passing | Luke Doty | 19/31, 167 yards |
| SC | Rushing | Kevin Harris | 16 carries, 61 yards, 2 TD |
| SC | Receiving | Payton Mangrum | 1 reception, 44 yards, TD |
| TENN | Passing | Hendon Hooker | 17/23, 225 yards, 3 TD |
| TENN | Rushing | Tiyon Evans | 16 carries, 119 yards, TD |
| TENN | Receiving | Velus Jones Jr. | 6 receptions, 103 yards, TD |

=== No. 13 Ole Miss ===
No. 13 Ole Miss at Tennessee

| Quarter | 1 | 2 | 3 | 4 | Total |
|---|---|---|---|---|---|
| No. 13 Ole Miss | 10 | 14 | 7 | 0 | 31 |
| Tennessee | 9 | 3 | 7 | 7 | 26 |

at Neyland Stadium, Knoxville, TN

- Date: October 16
- Game time: 7:30 pm
- Game weather: Sunny, 59 °F (15 °C)
- Game attendance: 102,455
- Referee: Marc Curles
- TV announcers (SECN): Tom Hart (play-by-play), Jordan Rodgers (color) and Cole Cubelic (sidelines)

Game information

First Quarter

- (9:50) MISS – Snoop Conner 1 yard rush, Caden Costa kick Ole Miss 7–0; 4 plays, 11 yards, 0:58
- (4:35) TENN – Matt Corral intentional grounding in end zone Ole Miss 7–2
- (3:51) TENN – Cedric Tillman 16 yard pass from Hendon Hooker, Chase McGrath kick Tennessee 9–7; 3 plays, 49 yards, 0:37
- (0:44) MISS – Caden Costa 30 yard field goal Ole Miss 10–9; 11 plays, 57 yards, 3:01

Second Quarter

- (11:27) MISS – Dannis Jackson 33 yard pass from Matt Corral, Caden Costa kick Ole Miss 17–9; 8 plays, 54 yards, 2:30
- (5:30) MISS – Snoop Conner 1 yard rush, Caden Costa kick Ole Miss 24–9; 12 plays, 91 yards, 3:37
- (0:00) TENN – Chase McGrath 39 yard field goal Ole Miss 24–12; 6 plays, 62 yards, 0:53

Third Quarter

- (12:38) TENN – Jabari Small 1 yard rush, Chase McGrath kick Ole Miss 24–19; 8 plays, 77 yards, 2:18
- (2:04) MISS – Dontario Drummond 16 yard pass from Matt Corral, Caden Costa kick Ole Miss 31–19; 8 plays, 68 yards, 3:02

Fourth Quarter

- (13:41) TENN – Hendon Hooker 5 yard rush, Chase McGrath kick Ole Miss 31–26; 9 plays, 88 yards, 3:14

| Statistics | MISS | TENN |
|---|---|---|
| First downs | 29 | 29 |
| Total yards | 510 | 467 |
| Passing yards | 231 | 245 |
| Rushing yards | 279 | 222 |
| Penalties | 10–75 | 6–48 |
| Turnovers | 1 | 1 |
| Time of possession | 34:09 | 25:51 |

| Team | Category | Player | Statistics |
|---|---|---|---|
| Ole Miss | Passing | Matt Corral | 21/38, 231 yards, 2 TD, 1 INT |
| Ole Miss | Rushing | Matt Corral | 30 carries, 195 yards |
| Ole Miss | Receiving | Dontario Drummond | 2 receptions, 66 yards, 1 TD |
| Tennessee | Passing | Hendon Hooker | 17/26, 233 yards, 1 TD |
| Tennessee | Rushing | Hendon Hooker | 23 carries, 108 yards, 1 TD |
| Tennessee | Receiving | Velus Jones Jr. | 6 receptions, 93 yards |

The game was delayed for nearly 20 minutes in the 4th quarter as some Tennessee fans started to throw objects onto the field, including a golf ball that hit Ole Miss head coach Lane Kiffin in the leg. The eruption occurred after officials ruled that Tennessee tight end Jacob Warren was short on 4th-and-24 with just under a minute left to play. On the Monday following the game, SEC commissioner Greg Sankey announced that Tennessee would be fined $250,000 due to the fans' actions.

=== At No. 4 Alabama ===
Tennessee at No. 4 Alabama

| Quarter | 1 | 2 | 3 | 4 | Total |
|---|---|---|---|---|---|
| Tennessee | 14 | 0 | 3 | 7 | 24 |
| No. 4 Alabama | 7 | 14 | 3 | 28 | 52 |

at Bryant-Denny Stadium, Tuscaloosa, AL

- Date: October 23
- Game time: 7:00 pm
- Game weather: Sunny, 72 °F (22 °C)
- Game attendance: 100,077
- Referee: Alex Moore
- TV announcers (ESPN): Jason Benetti (play-by-play), Greg McElroy (color), and Katie George (sidelines)

| Statistics | Tennessee | Alabama |
|---|---|---|
| First downs | 10 | 32 |
| Total yards | 346 | 574 |
| Rushing yards | 64 | 203 |
| Passing yards | 282 | 371 |
| Turnovers | 1 | 1 |
| Time of possession | 19:34 | 40:26 |

| Team | Category | Player | Statistics |
|---|---|---|---|
| Tennessee | Passing | Hendon Hooker | 19/28, 282 yards, 3 TD's, 1 INT |
| Tennessee | Rushing | Tiyon Evans | 7 carries, 30 yards |
| Tennessee | Receiving | Cedric Tillman | 7 receptions, 152 yards, 1 TD |
| Alabama | Passing | Bryce Young | 31/43, 371 yards, 2 TD's |
| Alabama | Rushing | Brian Robinson Jr. | 26 carries, 107 yards, 3 TD's |
| Alabama | Receiving | Jameson Williams | 6 receptions, 123 yards |

=== At No. 18 Kentucky ===
Tennessee at No. 16 Kentucky

| Quarter | 1 | 2 | 3 | 4 | Total |
|---|---|---|---|---|---|
| Tennessee | 14 | 10 | 14 | 7 | 45 |
| No. 18 Kentucky | 7 | 14 | 14 | 7 | 42 |

at Kroger Field, Lexington, KY

- Date: November 6
- Game time: 7:00 pm
- Game weather: Sunny, 46 °F (8 °C)
- Game attendance: 61,690
- Referee: Steve Marlowe
- TV announcers (ESPN2): Beth Mowins (play-by-play), Kirk Morrison (color), and Dawn Davenport (sidelines)

| Statistics | Tennessee | Kentucky |
|---|---|---|
| First downs | 17 | 35 |
| Total yards | 461 | 612 |
| Rushing yards | 145 | 225 |
| Passing yards | 316 | 387 |
| Turnovers | 1 | 1 |
| Time of possession | 13:52 | 46:08 |

| Team | Category | Player | Statistics |
|---|---|---|---|
| Tennessee | Passing | Hendon Hooker | 15/20, 316 yards, 4 TD’s |
| Tennessee | Rushing | Jabari Small | 4 carries, 55 yards, 1 TD |
| Tennessee | Receiving | Velus Jones Jr. | 5 receptions, 100 yards, 1 TD |
| Kentucky | Passing | Will Levis | 31/49, 372 yards, 3 TD’s, 1 INT |
| Kentucky | Rushing | Chris Rodriguez Jr. | 22 carries, 109 yards |
| Kentucky | Receiving | Wan'Dale Robinson | 13 receptions, 166 yards, 1 TD |

=== No. 1 Georgia ===
No. 1 Georgia at Tennessee

| Quarter | 1 | 2 | 3 | 4 | Total |
|---|---|---|---|---|---|
| No. 1 Georgia | 7 | 17 | 3 | 14 | 41 |
| Tennessee | 10 | 0 | 0 | 7 | 17 |

at Neyland Stadium, Knoxville, TN

- Date: November 13
- Game time: 3:30 p.m. EST
- Game weather: Sunny, 49 °F (9 °C)
- Game attendance: 100,074
- Referee: James Carter
- TV announcers (CBS): Brad Nessler (play-by-play), Gary Danielson (color) and Jamie Erdahl (sidelines)
- ESPN

Game information

First quarter

- (11:43) TENN – Velus Jones Jr. 9 Yd pass from Hendon Hooker (Chase McGrath Kick) (Tennessee 7–0)
- (9:11) UGA – James Cook 39 Yd Run (Jack Podlesny Kick) (Tied 7–7)
- (1:39) TENN – Chase McGrath 24 Yd Field Goal (Tennessee 10–7)

Second quarter

- (9:42) UGA – Jack Podlesny 40 Yd Field Goal (Tied 10–10)
- (7:24) UGA – Stetson Bennett 9 Yd Run (Jack Podlesny Kick) (Georgia 17–10)
- (0:37) UGA – James Cook 23 Yd pass from Stetson Bennett (Jack Podlesny Kick) (Georgia 24–10)

Third quarter

- (4:41) UGA – Jack Podlesny 26 Yd Field Goal (Georgia 27–10)

Fourth quarter

- (13:14) UGA – James Cook 5 Yd Run (Jack Podlesny Kick) (Georgia 34–10)
- (7:03) UGA – Kenny McIntosh 5 Yd Run (Jack Podlesny Kick) (Georgia 41–10)
- (3:38) TENN – Cedric Tillman 12 Yd pass from Joe Milton (Chase McGrath Kick) (Georgia 41–17)

| Statistics | UGA | TENN |
|---|---|---|
| First downs | 26 | 22 |
| Plays–yards | 70–487 | 84–387 |
| Rushes–yards | 41–274 | 36–55 |
| Passing yards | 213 | 332 |
| Passing: comp–att–int | 17–29–0 | 30–48–1 |
| Time of possession | 32:40 | 27:20 |

| Team | Category | Player | Statistics |
|---|---|---|---|
| UGA | Passing | Stetson Bennett | 17/29, 213 yards, 1 TD |
| UGA | Rushing | James Cook | 10 carries, 104 yards, 2 TD |
| UGA | Receiving | Adonai Mitchell | 5 receptions, 65 yards |
| TENN | Passing | Hendon Hooker | 24/37, 244 yards, 1TD, 1 INT |
| TENN | Rushing | Jabari Small | 12 carries, 49 yards |
| TENN | Receiving | Cedric Tillman | 10 receptions, 200 yards, 1 TD |

=== South Alabama ===
South Alabama at Tennessee

| Quarter | 1 | 2 | 3 | 4 | Total |
|---|---|---|---|---|---|
| South Alabama | 0 | 7 | 0 | 7 | 14 |
| Tennessee | 14 | 21 | 14 | 11 | 60 |

at Neyland Stadium, Knoxville, TN

- Date: November 20
- Game time: 7:30 pm
- Game weather: Cloudy, 46 °F (8 °C)
- Game attendance: 75,203
- Referee: Jason Autrey
- TV announcers (ESPNU): Clay Matvick (play-by-play) and Rocky Boiman (color)

Game information

First quarter

- (11:13) TENN – Jabari Small 1-yard rush (Chase McGrath Kick). Tennessee 7–0. Drive: 11 plays, 62 yards, 2:00.
- (6:46) TENN – Jaylen Wright 17-yard rush (Chase McGrath Kick). Tennessee 14–0. Drive: 9 plays, 88 yards, 1:57.

Second quarter

- (10:37) TENN – Cedric Tillman 27-yard pass from Hendon Hooker (Chase McGrath Kick). Tennessee 21–0. Drive: 8 plays, 87 yards, 2:38.
- (6:41) TENN – Princeton Fant 24-yard pass from Hendon Hooker (Chase McGrath Kick). Tennessee 28–0. Drive: 3 plays, 36 yards, 0:55.
- (1:36) USA – Lincoln Sefcik 3-yard pass from Desmond Trotter (Diego Guajardo Kick). Tennessee 28–7. Drive: 10 plays, 75 yards, 5:05.
- (1:18) TENN – Velus Jones Jr. 96-yard kickoff return (Chase McGrath Kick). Tennessee 35–7. Drive: 3 plays, 2 yards, 1:04.

Third quarter

- (12:06) TENN – Jabari Small 3-yard rush (Chase McGrath Kick). Tennessee 42–7. Drive: 7 plays, 84 yards, 1:54.
- (7:29) TENN – Hendon Hooker 6-yard rush (Chase McGrath Kick). Tennessee 49–7. Drive: 8 plays, 64 yards, 2:57.

Fourth quarter

- (12:50) TENN – Len'Neth Whitehead 5-yard rush (Chase McGrath Kick). Tennessee 56–7. Drive: 6 plays, 80 yards, 2:06.
- (11:02) USA – Jalen Tolbert 68-yard pass from Desmond Trotter (Diego Guajardo Kick). Tennessee 56–14. Drive: 4 plays, 75 yards, 1:48.
- (6:37) TENN – Team Safety. Tennessee 58–14. Drive: 3 plays, −9 yards, 1:40.
- (2:43) TENN – Team Safety. Tennessee 60–14. Drive: 6 plays, 26 yards, 2:18.

| Statistics | South Alabama | Tennessee |
|---|---|---|
| First downs | 13 | 28 |
| Total yards | 285 | 561 |
| Rushing yards | 69 | 250 |
| Passing yards | 216 | 311 |
| Turnovers | 0 | 0 |
| Time of possession | 37:00 | 23:00 |

| Team | Category | Player | Statistics |
|---|---|---|---|
| South Alabama | Passing | Desmond Trotter | 19/32, 216 yards, 2 TDs |
| South Alabama | Rushing | Kareem Walker | 7 carries, 29 yards |
| South Alabama | Receiving | Jalen Tolbert | 7 receptions, 143 yards, 1 TD |
| Tennessee | Passing | Hendon Hooker | 17/20, 273 yards, 2 TDs |
| Tennessee | Rushing | Jaylen Wright | 13 carries, 83 yards, 1 TD |
| Tennessee | Receiving | Velus Jones Jr. | 6 receptions, 103 yards |

=== Vanderbilt ===
Vanderbilt at Tennessee

| Quarter | 1 | 2 | 3 | 4 | Total |
|---|---|---|---|---|---|
| Vanderbilt | 0 | 7 | 6 | 8 | 21 |
| Tennessee | 7 | 17 | 14 | 7 | 45 |

at Neyland Stadium, Knoxville, TN

- Date: November 27
- Game time: 3:45 pm
- Game weather: Sunny, 46 °F (8 °C)
- Game attendance: 77,349
- Referee: David Smith
- TV announcers (SECN): Dave Neal (play-by-play), Deuce McAllister (color), and Andraya Carter (sidelines)

| Statistics | VAN | TENN |
|---|---|---|
| First downs | 18 | 25 |
| Total yards | 321 | 441 |
| Rushing yards | 115 | 285 |
| Passing yards | 206 | 156 |
| Turnovers | 1 | 1 |
| Time of possession | 38:16 | 21:44 |

| Team | Category | Player | Statistics |
|---|---|---|---|
| Vanderbilt | Passing | Mike Wright | 16/31, 198 yards, TD, INT |
| Vanderbilt | Rushing | Rocko Griffin | 30 carries, 104 yards, TD |
| Vanderbilt | Receiving | Will Sheppard | 5 receptions, 98 yards, TD |
| Tennessee | Passing | Hendon Hooker | 10/18, 156 yards, 2 TD |
| Tennessee | Rushing | Jaylen Wright | 15 carries, 112 yards, TD |
| Tennessee | Receiving | Cedric Tillman | 6 receptions, 106 yards, 2 TD |

=== Purdue ===
2021 TransPerfect Music City Bowl

| Quarter | 1 | 2 | 3 | 4 | OT | Total |
|---|---|---|---|---|---|---|
| Tennessee | 21 | 0 | 10 | 14 | 0 | 45 |
| Purdue | 7 | 16 | 7 | 15 | 3 | 48 |

at Nissan Stadium, Nashville, Tennessee

- Date: December 30
- Game time: 3:00 p.m.
- Game weather: Cloudy, 57 °F (14 °C)
- Game attendance: 69,489
- Referee: Jerry Magallanes
- TV announcers (ESPN): Tom Hart (play-by-play), Jordan Rodgers (color), and Cole Cubelic (sidelines)

== Players drafted into the NFL ==
Tennessee had five players selected in the 2022 NFL draft.

| Round | Pick | Player | Position | NFL club |
|---|---|---|---|---|
| 2 | 49 | Alontae Taylor | CB | New Orleans Saints |
| 3 | 71 | Velus Jones Jr | WR | Chicago Bears |
| 5 | 175 | Matthew Butler | DT | Las Vegas Raiders |
| 6 | 199 | Cade Mays | OG | Carolina Panthers |
| 6 | 204 | Theo Jackson | S | Tennessee Titans |
