= 2021 Vanderbilt Commodores football team =

American college football season

2021 Vanderbilt Commodores football
- Conference: Southeastern Conference
- Eastern Division
- Record: 2–10 (0–8 SEC)
- Head coach: Clark Lea (1st season)
- Offensive coordinator: David Raih (1st season)
- Offensive scheme: Pro spread
- Defensive coordinator: Jesse Minter (1st season)
- Base defense: 4–2–5
- Home stadium: Vanderbilt Stadium

2021 Southeastern Conference football standings
	Conf.			Overall
Team	W		L	W		L
Eastern Division
No. 1 Georgia x#^	8	–	0	14	–	1
No. 18 Kentucky*	5	–	3	10	–	3
Tennessee	4	–	4	7	–	6
Missouri	3	–	5	6	–	7
South Carolina	3	–	5	7	–	6
Florida	2	–	6	6	–	7
Vanderbilt	0	–	8	2	–	10
Western Division
No. 2 Alabama x$^	7	–	1	13	–	2
No. 11 Ole Miss	6	–	2	10	–	3
No. 21 Arkansas	4	–	4	9	–	4
Mississippi State	4	–	4	7	–	6
Texas A&M	4	–	4	8	–	4
Auburn	3	–	5	6	–	7
LSU	3	–	5	6	–	7
Championship: Alabama 41, Georgia 24
# – College Football Playoff champion; ^ – College Football Playoff participant; $ – Conference champion; x – Division champion/co-champions; * – Kentucky vacated all wins due to NCAA violations.; Rankings from AP Poll

The 2021 Vanderbilt Commodores football team represented Vanderbilt University in the 2021 NCAA Division I FBS football season. The Commodores played their home games at Vanderbilt Stadium in Nashville, Tennessee and competed in the Eastern Division of the Southeastern Conference (SEC). They were led by first-year head coach Clark Lea.

== Staff ==
Name	Position	Consecutive season at Vanderbilt in current position
Clark Lea	Head coach	1st
David Raih	Offensive coordinator/wide receivers	1st
Jesse Minter	Defensive coordinator/safeties coach	1st
Justin Lustig	Special teams coordinator/ tight ends coach	1st
Joey Lynch	Pass game coordinator/quarterbacks coach	1st
AJ Blazek	Offensive line coach	1st
Norval McKenzie	Run game coordinator/running backs coach	1st
Jovan Haye	Defensive ends coach	1st
Inoke Breckterfield	Defensive tackles Coach	1st
John Egorugwu	Linebackers coach	1st
Lamar Morgan	Cornerbacks coach	1st

== Schedule ==
Date	Time	Opponent	Site	TV	Result	Attendance
September 4	7:00 p.m.	East Tennessee State*	Vanderbilt Stadium; Nashville, TN	ESPN+/SECN+	L 3–23	22,029
September 11	9:00 p.m.	at Colorado State*	Canvas Stadium; Fort Collins, CO	CBSSN	W 24–21	27,233
September 18	7:00 p.m.	Stanford*	Vanderbilt Stadium; Nashville, TN	ESPNU	L 23–41	21,124
September 25	11:00 a.m.	No. 2 Georgia	Vanderbilt Stadium; Nashville, TN (rivalry)	SECN	L 0–62	32,178
October 2	6:30 p.m.	UConn*	Vanderbilt Stadium; Nashville, TN	ESPNU	W 30–28	21,218
October 9	11:00 a.m.	at No. 20 Florida	Ben Hill Griffin Stadium; Gainesville, FL	SECN	L 0–42	86,258
October 16	3:00 p.m.	at South Carolina	Williams–Brice Stadium; Columbia, SC	SECN	L 20–21	64,695
October 23	3:00 p.m.	Mississippi State	Vanderbilt Stadium; Nashville, TN	SECN	L 6–45	22,036
October 30	2:00 p.m.	Missouri	Vanderbilt Stadium; Nashville, TN	SECN	L 28–37	19,821
November 13	6:00 p.m.	Kentucky	Vanderbilt Stadium; Nashville, TN (rivalry)	ESPN2	L 17–34	25,798
November 20	6:30 p.m.	at No. 12 Ole Miss	Vaught–Hemingway Stadium; Oxford, MS (rivalry)	SECN	L 17–31	50,819
November 27	2:45 p.m.	at Tennessee	Neyland Stadium; Knoxville, TN (rivalry)	SECN	L 21–45	77,349
*Non-conference game; Rankings from AP Poll (and CFP Rankings, after November 2) - Released prior to game; All times are in Central time

== Rankings ==
Ranking movements Legend: — = Not ranked
	Week																
Poll	Pre	1	2	3	4	5	6	7	8	9	10	11	12	13	14	15	Final
AP	—	—	—	—	—	—	—	—	—	—	—	—	—	—	—	—	—
Coaches	—	—	—	—	—	—	—	—	—	—	—	—	—	—	—	—	—
CFP	Not released										—	—	—	—	—	—	Not released

== Roster ==
2021 Vanderbilt Commodores Football Roster
Quarterbacks: 5 Mike Wright – sophomore (6'4, 190); 8 Ken Seals – sophomore (6'3, 220); 18 Jeremy Moussa – senior (6'3, 225); 38 Wilson Long – sophomore (6'0, 197); 39 Blake Jarrett – freshman (6'2, 186); Running backs: 6 Re'Mahn Davis – junior (5'9, 205); 24 Rocko Griffin – sophomore (5'9, 203); 42 Patrick Smith – freshman (5'10, 180); 43 James Ziglor III – freshman (5'11, 190); 45 Dylan Betts-Pauley – freshman (5'11, 240); Fullback: 34 Luke Blanton – senior (6'2, 240); Wide receivers: 2 Amir Abdur-Rahman – senior (6'4, 215); 7 Cam Johnson – senior (6'0, 200); 14 Will Sheppard – sophomore (6'3, 200); 19 Chris Pierce Jr. – (redshirt) senior (6'4, 235); 46 Ezra McAllister – freshman (6'0, 183); 81 Tyrell Alexander – (redshirt) senior (6'1, 195); 82 Devin Boddie Jr. – junior (5'11, 180); 83 Gamarion Carter – freshman (6'2, 195); 87 Quincy Skinner Jr. – freshman (6'1, 200); 89 Logan Kyle – sophomore (6'3, 209); Tight ends: 10 Gavin Schoenwald – senior (6'4, 243); 84 Justin Ball – junior (6'6, 245); 85 Joel DeCoursey – junior (6'4, 235); 86 Ben Bresnahan – senior (6'4, 235); 93 Thomas Smith – (redshirt) senior (6'1, 226); 96 Brayden Bapst – junior (6'8, 280); Long snappers: 47 Wesley Schelling – sophomore (6'5, 235); 49 Zach Drevino – senior (6'0, 209); Punters: 30 Jared Wheatley – junior (6'1, 205); 58 Jared Elstein – senior (6'2, 185); 59 Pierson Cooke – senior (6'0, 209); 95 Harrison Smith – senior (5'10, 183)	Offensive linemen: 52 Kevo Wesley – sophomore (6'4, 290); 54 Tyler Steen – senior (6'5, 315); 60 Gunner Hansen – freshman (6'5, 317); 62 Julian Hernandez – junior (6'4, 304); 63 Delfin Xavier Castillo – freshman (6'5, 330); 65 Michael Warden – senior (6'2, 286); 66 Charlie Clark – freshman (6'7, 284); 67 Jake Ketschek – freshman (6'4, 305); 68 Jason Brooks Jr. – sophomore (6'4, 295); 70 Bradley Ashmore – sophomore (6'6, 290); 71 Gage Pitchford – freshman (6'6, 300); 72 Dan Dawkins – senior (6'3, 304); 74 Cole Clemens – (redshirt) senior (6'6, 335); 75 Ben Cox – sophomore (6'5, 310); 76 Jonathan Stewart – (redshirt) senior (6'7, 340); 77 Junior Uzebu – junior (6'6, 326); 78 Bryce Bailey – (redshirt) senior (6'5, 304); 79 Trent Weaver – sophomore (6'3, 299); Defensive linemen: 9 Daevion Davis – junior (6'2, 285); 35 Malik Langham – senior (6'5, 296); 55 Devin Lee – freshman (6'3, 277); 57 Tyler Bence – freshman (6'3, 255); 64 Derek Green – junior (6'5, 318); 80 Alex Williams – junior (6'6, 265); 90 Nate Clifton – junior (6'5, 280); 91 Christian James – junior (6'4, 275); 92 Marcus Bradley – freshman (6'3, 275); 94 Raashaan Wilkins Jr. – senior (6'3, 310); 96 Jacques Hunter – freshman (6'4, 230); 97 Terion Sugick – freshman (6'2, 305); 99 Lorenza Surgers – senior (6'5, 265); Placekickers: 16 Jack Cardillo – (redshirt) senior (6'1, 180); 36 Joseph Bulovas – (redshirt) senior (6'0, 210); 58 Jared Elstein – senior (6'2, 185); 59 Pierson Cooke – senior (6'0, 209); 61 Will Faris – freshman (5'11, 166)	Linebackers: 0 Anfernee Orji – junior (6'2, 230); 1 Elijah McAllister – senior (6'6, 261); 12 Brayden DeVault-Smith – (redshirt) senior (6'3, 227); 17 Feleti Afemui – (redshirt) senior (6'3, 245); 20 Jack Barton – sophomore (6'1, 215); 29 Miles Capers – freshman (6'5, 230); 31 Michael Spencer – sophomore (6'4, 260); 32 Ethan Barr – sophomore (6'3, 244); 40 Tommy Eckels – sophomore (6'2, 225); 50 Errington Truesdell – freshman (6'1, 224); 51 Michael Mincey – freshman (6'1, 232); 53 Alston Orji – senior (6'2, 236); 56 Alex Brown – senior (6'2, 242); 88 Michael Owusu – (redshirt) senior (6'5, 231); 98 Daniel Gaw – freshman (6'3, 230); Cornerbacks: 13 Gabe Jeudy-Lally – junior (6'1, 186); 22 John Howse IV – freshman (6'2, 190); 23 Jaylen Mahoney – junior (5'11, 191); 25 Ryan McCord – sophomore (6'1, 190); 26 B. J. Anderson – senior (6'1, 195); 28 Allan George – (redshirt) senior (6'1, 195); 41 Tyson Russell – freshman (5'11, 180); Defensive backs: 4 Chase Lloyd – sophomore (6'2, 203); 15 Camden Coleman – senior (6'1, 215); 33 De'Rickey Wright – sophomore (6'4, 230); 37 Marlem Sewell – freshman (6'1, 185); 43 James Ziglor III – freshman (5'11, 190); 44 Alan Wright – freshman (6'0, 181); 48 C. J. Taylor – freshman (6'1, 206); Safeties: 3 Deshaun Jerkins – senior (6'0, 200); 11 Justin Harris – junior (6'1, 195); 20 Jack Barton – sophomore (6'1, 215); 21 Maxwell Worship – senior (6'1, 210); 27 Brendon Harris – senior (6'1, 214)

== Game summaries ==
=== East Tennessee State ===
	1	2	3	4	Total
Buccaneers	0	10	3	10	23
Commodores	3	0	0	0	3

Statistics

Statistics	ETSU	VAN
First downs	13	23
Total yards	314	321
Rushing yards	179	85
Passing yards	135	236
Turnovers	0	3
Time of possession	32:47	27:13

Team	Category	Player	Statistics
East Tennessee State	Passing	Tyler Riddell	13/22, 135 yards, TD
East Tennessee State	Rushing	Quay Holmes	23 rushes, 149 yards
East Tennessee State	Receiving	Will Huzzie	4 receptions, 62 yards
Vanderbilt	Passing	Ken Seals	20/35, 195 yards, 2 INT
Vanderbilt	Rushing	Re'Mahn Davis	15 rushes, 58 yards
Vanderbilt	Receiving	Will Sheppard	9 receptions, 84 yards

=== At Colorado State ===
	1	2	3	4	Total
Commodores	0	7	14	3	24
Rams	7	7	0	7	21

Statistics

Statistics	VAN	CSU
First downs	21	20
Total yards	342	445
Rushing yards	104	207
Passing yards	238	238
Turnovers	1	1
Time of possession	35:27	24:33

Team	Category	Player	Statistics
Vanderbilt	Passing	Ken Seals	27/42, 238 yards, 2 TD
Vanderbilt	Rushing	Re'Mahn Davis	17 rushes, 77 yards
Vanderbilt	Receiving	Chris Pierce Jr.	4 receptions, 76 yards, TD
Colorado State	Passing	Todd Centeio	20/38, 238 yards, 2 TD, INT
Colorado State	Rushing	David Bailey	15 rushes, 80 yards, TD
Colorado State	Receiving	Trey McBride	8 receptions, 114 yards, TD

=== Stanford ===
	1	2	3	4	Total
Cardinal	14	13	7	7	41
Commodores	7	7	3	6	23

Statistics

Statistics	STAN	VAN
First downs	20	23
Total yards	422	398
Rushing yards	204	247
Passing yards	218	151
Turnovers	0	1
Time of possession	28:38	31:22

Team	Category	Player	Statistics
Stanford	Passing	Tanner McKee	19/29, 218 yards, 2 TD
Stanford	Rushing	Austin Jones	7 rushes, 80 yards
Stanford	Receiving	Brycen Tremayne	5 receptions, 54 yards TD
Vanderbilt	Passing	Ken Seals	16/37, 120 yards, TD, INT
Vanderbilt	Rushing	Rocko Griffin	19 rushes, 107 yards
Vanderbilt	Receiving	Chris Pierce Jr.	6 receptions, 52 yards

=== No. 2 Georgia ===
	1	2	3	4	Total
No. 2 Bulldogs	35	3	17	7	62
Commodores	0	0	0	0	0

Statistics

Statistics	UGA	VAN
First downs	28	4
Total yards	532	77
Rushing yards	241	53
Passing yards	291	24
Turnovers	1	3
Time of possession	37:16	22:44

Team	Category	Player	Statistics
Georgia	Passing	Stetson Bennett	11/15, 151 yards, TD, INT
Georgia	Rushing	Zamir White	9 rushes, 48 yards, TD
Georgia	Receiving	Brock Bowers	4 receptions, 69 yards, 2 TD
Vanderbilt	Passing	Mike Wright	3/9, 16 yards, INT
Vanderbilt	Rushing	Mike Wright	8 rushes, 41 yards
Vanderbilt	Receiving	Cam Johnson	1 reception, 10 yards

=== UConn ===
	1	2	3	4	Total
Huskies	6	10	0	12	28
Commodores	3	14	0	13	30

Statistics

Statistics	CONN	VAN
First downs	24	23
Total yards	523	439
Rushing yards	192	106
Passing yards	331	333
Turnovers	2	2
Time of possession	28:10	31:50

Team	Category	Player	Statistics
UConn	Passing	Steven Krajewski	18/34, 264 yards, 2 TD, 2 INT
UConn	Rushing	Nate Carter	24 rushes, 123 yards
UConn	Receiving	Keelan Marion	4 receptions, 102 yards, TD
Vanderbilt	Passing	Ken Seals	27/40, 333 yards, 2 TD, INT
Vanderbilt	Rushing	Rocko Griffin	19 rushes, 77 yards, TD
Vanderbilt	Receiving	Will Sheppard	8 receptions, 119 yards, 2 TD

=== At No. 20 Florida ===
	1	2	3	4	Total
Commodores	0	0	0	0	0
No. 20 Gators	14	7	21	0	42

Statistics

Statistics	VAN	FLA
First downs	18	18
Total yards	287	479
Rushing yards	88	181
Passing yards	199	298
Turnovers	2	2
Time of possession	36:10	23:50

Team	Category	Player	Statistics
Vanderbilt	Passing	Ken Seals	22/43, 192 yards, 2 INT
Vanderbilt	Rushing	Patrick Smith	17 rushes, 75 yards
Vanderbilt	Receiving	Cam Johnson	4 receptions, 49 yards
Florida	Passing	Emory Jones	14/22, 273 yards, 4 TD, INT
Florida	Rushing	Nay'Quan Wright	7 rushes, 46 yards
Florida	Receiving	Jacob Copeland	5 receptions, 79 yards, TD

=== At South Carolina ===
	1	2	3	4	Total
Commodores	3	7	7	3	20
Gamecocks	14	0	0	7	21

Statistics

Statistics	VAN	SC
First downs	15	17
Total yards	312	434
Rushing yards	106	117
Passing yards	206	317
Turnovers	2	4
Time of possession	31:13	28:47

Team	Category	Player	Statistics
Vanderbilt	Passing	Mike Wright	11/21, 206 yards, TD, INT
Vanderbilt	Rushing	Rocko Griffin	18 rushes, 57 yards, TD
Vanderbilt	Receiving	Will Sheppard	3 receptions, 120 yards, TD
South Carolina	Passing	Luke Doty	17/27, 242 yards, 2 TD, 2 INT
South Carolina	Rushing	ZaQuandre White	12 rushes, 65 yards
South Carolina	Receiving	Jaheim Bell	6 receptions, 136 yards, TD

=== Mississippi State ===
	1	2	3	4	Total
Bulldogs	10	14	7	14	45
Commodores	0	3	3	0	6

Statistics

Statistics	MSST	VAN
First downs	29	5
Total yards	522	155
Rushing yards	61	9
Passing yards	461	146
Turnovers	2	1
Time of possession	39:02	20:58

Team	Category	Player	Statistics
Mississippi State	Passing	Will Rogers	41/57, 384 yards, 4 TD, 2 INT
Mississippi State	Rushing	Dillon Johnson	7 carries, 34 yards
Mississippi State	Receiving	Jaden Walley	5 receptions, 72 yards
Vanderbilt	Passing	Mike Wright	12/17, 122 yards, 1 INT
Vanderbilt	Rushing	Rocko Griffin	7 carries, 12 yards
Vanderbilt	Receiving	Devin Boddie Jr.	4 receptions, 69 yards

=== Missouri ===
	1	2	3	4	Total
Tigers	10	7	7	13	37
Commodores	7	7	7	7	28

Statistics

Statistics	MIZ	VAN
First downs	23	20
Total yards	502	380
Rushing yards	284	258
Passing yards	218	122
Turnovers	1	1
Time of possession	33:45	26:15

Team	Category	Player	Statistics
Missouri	Passing	Connor Bazelak	22/28, 218 yards, TD, INT
Missouri	Rushing	Tyler Badie	31 carries, 254 yards, 2 TD
Missouri	Receiving	Keke Chism	4 receptions, 95 yards, TD
Vanderbilt	Passing	Mike Wright	14/28, 122 yards, 3 TD, INT
Vanderbilt	Rushing	Mike Wright	14 carries, 152 yards
Vanderbilt	Receiving	Chris Pierce Jr.	4 receptions, 54 yards

=== Kentucky ===
	1	2	3	4	Total
Wildcats	7	24	0	3	34
Commodores	3	0	8	6	17

Statistics

Statistics	UK	VAN
First downs	21	16
Total yards	413	266
Rushing yards	236	96
Passing yards	177	170
Turnovers	1	1
Time of possession	29:46	30:14

Team	Category	Player	Statistics
Kentucky	Passing	Will Levis	14/22, 177 yards, 2 TD’s, 1 INT
Kentucky	Rushing	Chris Rodriguez Jr.	16 carries, 144 yards, 1 TD
Kentucky	Receiving	Wan'Dale Robinson	6 receptions, 75 yards, 1 TD
Vanderbilt	Passing	Ken Seals	12/17, 87 yards, 1 INT
Vanderbilt	Rushing	Patrick Smith	18 carries, 84 yards
Vanderbilt	Receiving	Chris Pierce Jr	6 receptions, 69 yards, 1 TD

=== At No. 12 Ole Miss ===
	1	2	3	4	Total
Commodores	3	6	0	8	17
No. 12 Rebels	10	14	0	7	31

Statistics

Statistics	VAN	MISS
First downs	25	23
Total yards	454	470
Rushing yards	241	326
Passing yards	213	144
Turnovers	1	1
Time of possession	38:57	21:03

Team	Category	Player	Statistics
Vanderbilt	Passing	Mike Wright	22/44, 242 yards, 1 INT
Vanderbilt	Rushing	Rocko Griffin	26 carries, 117 yards, 1 TD
Vanderbilt	Receiving	Chris Pierce Jr.	10 receptions, 113 yards
Ole Miss	Passing	Matt Corral	27/36, 326 yards, 2 TD, 1 INT
Ole Miss	Rushing	Jerrion Ealy	9 carries, 55 yards, 1 TD
Ole Miss	Receiving	Jahcour Pearson	4 receptions, 101 yards

=== At Tennessee ===
	1	2	3	4	Total
Commodores	0	7	6	8	21
Volunteers	7	17	14	7	45

Statistics

Statistics	VAN	TENN
First downs	18	25
Total yards	321	441
Rushing yards	115	285
Passing yards	206	156
Turnovers	1	1
Time of possession	38:16	21:44

Team	Category	Player	Statistics
Vanderbilt	Passing	Mike Wright	16/31, 198 yards, TD, INT
Vanderbilt	Rushing	Rocko Griffin	30 carries, 104 yards, TD
Vanderbilt	Receiving	Will Sheppard	5 receptions, 98 yards, TD
Tennessee	Passing	Hendon Hooker	10/18, 156 yards, 2 TD
Tennessee	Rushing	Jaylen Wright	15 carries, 112 yards, TD
Tennessee	Receiving	Cedric Tillman	6 receptions, 106 yards, 2 TD
