= Zeb Noland =

American football player and coach (born 1997)

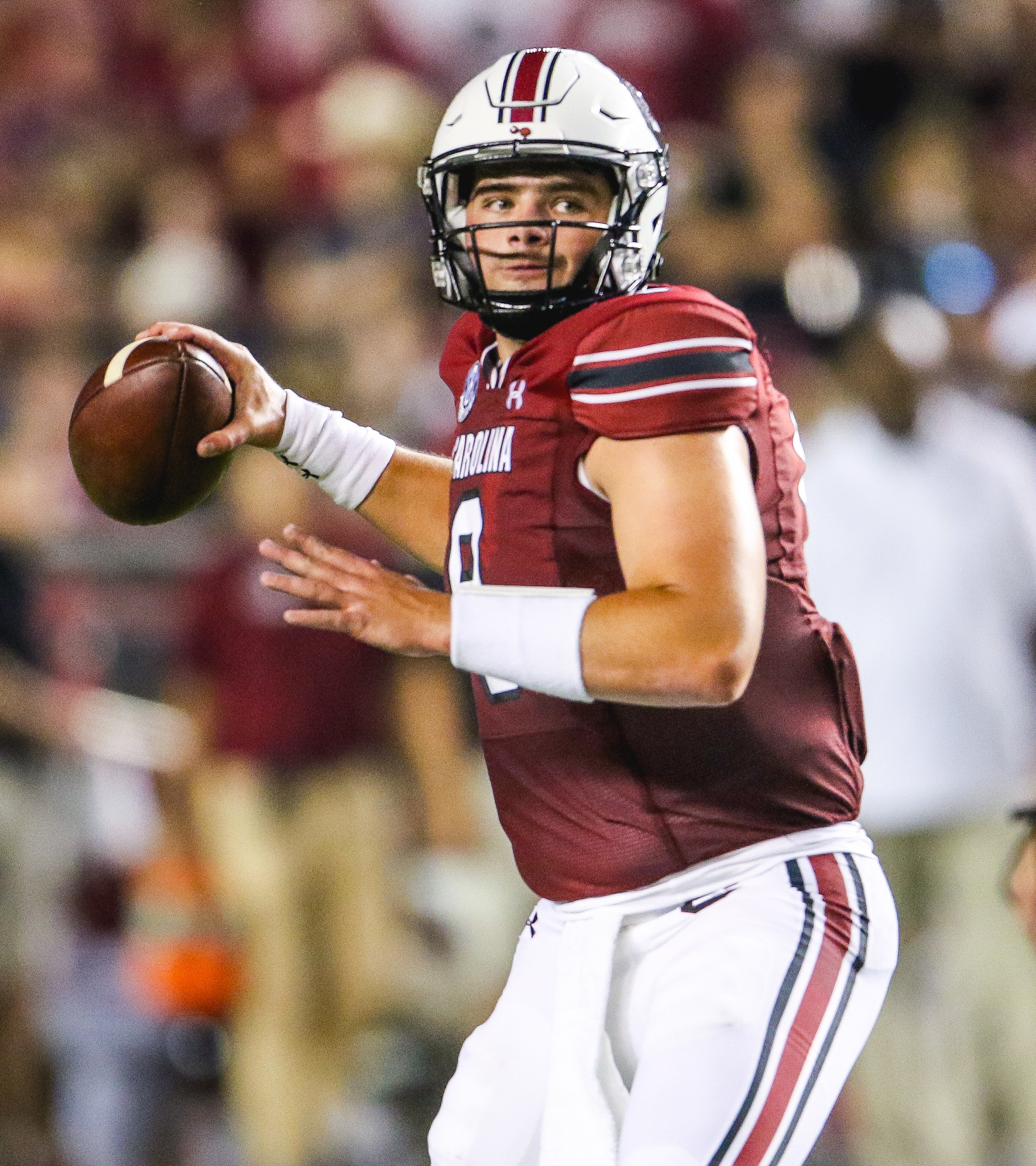
- Noland with South Carolina in 2021

Current position
- Title: Quarterbacks coach
- Team: Murray State
- Conference: MVFC

Biographical details
- Born: August 16, 1997 (age 29)

Playing career
- 2016–2018: Iowa State
- 2019–2020: North Dakota State
- 2021: South Carolina
- Position: Quarterback

Coaching career (HC unless noted)
- 2021–2022: South Carolina (GA)
- 2023: Jefferson HS (GA) (OC)
- 2024–present: Murray State (QB)

Zebuliah Noland (born August 16, 1997) is an American college football coach and former quarterback. He is the quarterbacks coach for Murray State University, a position he has held since 2024. He played college football for the Iowa State Cyclones, North Dakota State Bison, and South Carolina Gamecocks. He drew media attention upon being added to the Gamecocks roster, where he was named their starting quarterback, despite being a graduate assistant with the team.

== Early life ==
Noland, the son of Travis and Julie Noland. He played high school football at Oconee County High School in Watkinsville, Georgia under his father, a former Appalachian State quarterback. He earned all-region honors twice, and led the team to their first regional championship since 2004. Rated the No. 60 pro-style quarterback in his class by 247Sports, Noland received offers from Toledo, Middle Tennessee, Colorado State, Richmond, FIU, and Appalachian State. He ultimately committed to Appalachian State University on June 6, 2015, but later rescinded that commitment upon receiving an offer from Iowa State University. He signed a letter of intent and committed to Iowa State on December 21, 2015, and formally enrolled less than a month later.

== College career ==
=== Iowa State ===
After sitting out as a redshirt freshman in 2016, Noland saw his first action at Iowa State the following year. He played in four contests for the Cyclones in 2017, including a start in the Cyclones' win against the Baylor Bears. He saw further game time in 2018, playing in five games for Iowa State. Following the conclusion of the season, Noland transferred to North Dakota State University.

=== North Dakota State ===
Arriving in Fargo as a redshirt junior, Noland competed for the starting role with Trey Lance and Noah Sanders, ultimately earning the second spot on the depth chart behind Lance. He made eight appearances for the North Dakota State Bison in 2019; North Dakota State would go on to win the national championship that season. Following Lance's departure for the National Football League (NFL), Noland ascended to the starting role, and made seven starts for North Dakota State in the spring 2021 season (delayed from fall 2020 due to the COVID-19 pandemic). He led the team in total offense and finished with a 5–2 record as a starter for the Bison.

Head coach Matt Entz announced Noland's departure from the program on April 25, 2021, with Noland reported to have taken a Power Five coaching job.

=== South Carolina ===
In May 2021, Noland was hired as a graduate assistant coach at the University of South Carolina. He received media attention after being added to the roster and promoted to the starting quarterback position, despite being a member of the coaching staff, following an injury to starter Luke Doty in practice. He made his debut for the Gamecocks on September 4, 2021, throwing for 121 yards and four touchdowns in a 46–0 season-opening win against the Eastern Illinois Panthers. On September 18, against the Georgia Bulldogs, Noland suffered a hand injury on the Gamecocks' first possession and was replaced by Doty in what was a 40–13 blowout for Georgia. On October 16, against the Vanderbilt Commodores, Noland replaced Doty and led the Gamecocks on a game-winning drive in a 21–20 win. Noland was named the starter again, after it was confirmed that Doty had reinjured his foot, ending his season. On October 23, against the Texas A&M Aggies, Noland was benched in the fourth quarter for Jason Brown, and it was later revealed that he would undergo surgery to repair a torn meniscus in his right knee. Although he hoped to make it in time to start against the Florida Gators, Noland missed the next three games, and replaced Jason Brown in the fourth quarter of a shutout loss to the Clemson Tigers. Noland made his final appearance for the Gamecocks at the 2021 Duke's Mayo Bowl and completed three passes for 82 yards and a touchdown.

=== Statistics ===
Season	Team	Games			Passing								Rushing			
Season	Team	GP	GS	Record (Note: Accounts for only GS as a QB. On 12/30/21 Noland started at WR.)	Cmp	Att	Pct	Yds	Y/A	TD	Int	Rtg	Att	Yds	Avg	TD
2016	Iowa State	0	0	—	Redshirted (redshirt)											
2017	Iowa State	4	1	1–0	36	66	54.5	533	8.1	2	1	129.4	1	−9	−9.0	0
2018	Iowa State	5	4	2–2	70	110	63.6	722	6.6	4	1	129.0	7	−13	−1.9	0
2019	North Dakota State	8	0	—	9	14	64.3	120	8.6	1	0	159.9	1	−2	−2.0	0
2020	North Dakota State	7	7	5–2	51	100	51.0	721	7.2	5	6	116.1	16	19	1.2	1
2021	South Carolina	7	5	2–2	53	95	55.8	690	7.3	7	1	139.0	19	−34	−1.8	0
Career		31	17	10–6	219	385	56.9	2,786	7.2	19	9	129.3	43	–30	–0.7	1

== Coaching career ==
In 2022, Noland returned to his previous role as a graduate assistant coach.

For the 2023 season, Noland was the offensive coordinator for the Jefferson High School, coaching with his father, Travis Noland. He was part of the coaching staff for five star linebacker and Clemson commit Sammy Brown. Noland was also part of the coaching staff for all-state selection Gavin Markey and lineman Brian Senter.

On February 9, 2024, Noland was named the quarterbacks coach at Murray State University, as he had worked alongside Jody Wright at the University of South Carolina.

== Personal life ==
Noland holds a degree in university studies from North Dakota State University, graduating in December 2019.
