= List of South Carolina Gamecocks football seasons =

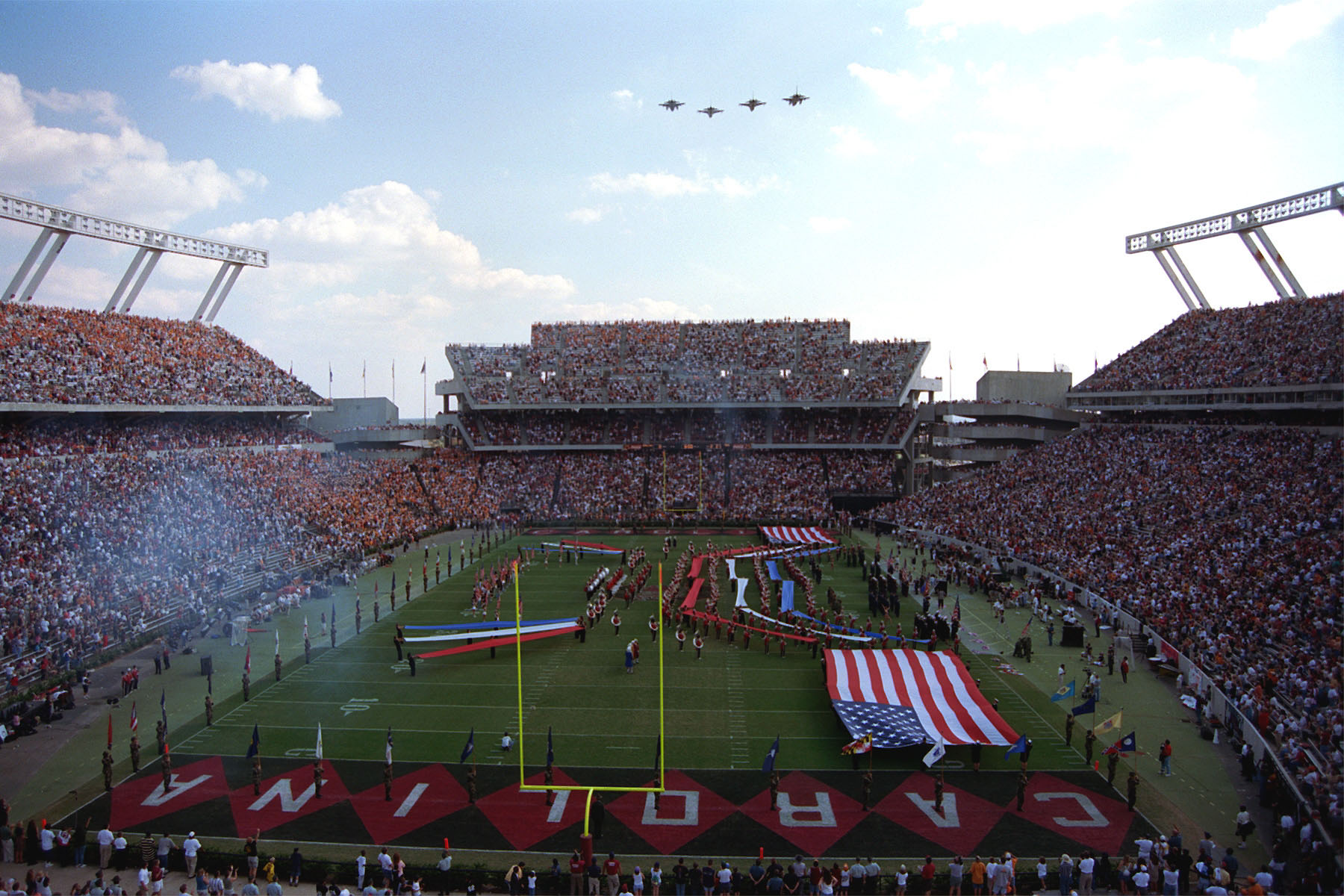
Williams-Brice Stadium, home field of the Gamecocks since 1934

This is a list of seasons completed by the South Carolina Gamecocks football team of the National Collegiate Athletic Association (NCAA) Division I Football Bowl Subdivision (FBS). Since the team's creation in 1892, the Gamecocks have participated in 1,309 officially sanctioned games, including 25 bowl games.

The Gamecocks have been a member of several athletic conferences. From 1892 to 1932, South Carolina competed as a football independent. From 1933 through 1952, the Gamecocks were part of the Southern Conference. In 1953, South Carolina became one of the original members of the Atlantic Coast Conference, where it remained through 1970. The Gamecocks competed as an independent again from 1971 to 1991. In 1992, South Carolina joined the Southeastern Conference's East Division, where it won a division title in 2010.

== Seasons ==
Year	Coach	Overall	Conference	Standing	Bowl/playoffs	Coaches^{#}	AP^{°}
Independent (1892–1895)
1892	South Carolina	0-1					
1893	No team						
1894	South Carolina	0–2					
1895	South Carolina	2–1					
Richard S. Whaley (Independent) (1896)
1896	South Carolina	1–3					
Frederick M. Murphy (Independent) (1897)
1897	South Carolina	0–3					
Bill Wertenbaker (Independent) (1898)
1898	South Carolina	1–2					
Irving O. Hunt (Independent) (1899–1900)
1899	South Carolina	2–3					
1900	South Carolina	4–3					
Byron W. Dickson (Independent) (1901)
1901	South Carolina	3–4					
Bob Williams (Independent) (1902–1903)
1902	South Carolina	6–1					
1903	South Carolina	8–2					
Christie Benet (Independent) (1904–1905)
1904	South Carolina	4–3–1					
1905	South Carolina	4–2–1					
1906	No team						
Douglas McKay (Independent) (1907)
1907	South Carolina	3–0					
Christie Benet (Independent) (1908–1909)
1908	South Carolina	3–5–1					
1909	South Carolina	2–6					
John Neff) (Independent) (1910–1911)
1910	South Carolina	4–4					
1911	South Carolina	1–4–2					
Norman B. Edgerton (Independent) (1912–1914)
1912	South Carolina	5–2–1					
1913	South Carolina	4–3					
1914	South Carolina	5–5–1					
Norman B. Edgerton (Southern Intercollegiate Athletic Association) (1915)
1915	South Carolina	5–3–1	1–1–1	T–13th			
W. Rice Warren (Southern Intercollegiate Athletic Association) (1916)
1916	South Carolina	2–7	2–4				
Dixon Foster (Southern Intercollegiate Athletic Association) (1917)
1917	South Carolina	3–5	2–3	T–9th			
Frank Dobson (Southern Intercollegiate Athletic Association) (1918)
1918	South Carolina	2–1–1	2–1–1	5th			
Dixon Foster (Southern Intercollegiate Athletic Association) (1919)
1919	South Carolina	1–7–1	0–4–1	20th			
Sol Metzger (Southern Intercollegiate Athletic Association) (1920–1921)
1920	South Carolina	5–4	3–1	T–6th			
1921	South Carolina	5–1–2	2–1–1	T–10th			
Sol Metzger (Southern Conference) (1922–1924)
1922	South Carolina	5–4	0–2	T–18th			
1923	South Carolina	4–6	0–4	T–19th			
1924	South Carolina	7–3	3–2	T–6th			
Branch Bocock (Southern Conference) (1925–1926)
1925	South Carolina	7–3	2–2	T–10th			
1926	South Carolina	6–4	4–2	T–4th			
Harry Lightsey (Southern Conference) (1927)
1927	South Carolina	4–5	2–4	T–16th			
Billy Laval (Southern Conference) (1928–1934)
1928	South Carolina	6–2–2	2–2–1	T–10th			
1929	South Carolina	6–5	2–5	15th			
1930	South Carolina	6–4	4–3	T–11th			
1931	South Carolina	5–4–2	3–3–1	T–8th			
1932	South Carolina	5–4–2	2–2–2	T–10th			
1933	South Carolina	6–3–1	3–0	T–1st			
1934	South Carolina	5–4	2–3	7th			
Don McCallister (Southern Conference) (1935–1937)
1935	South Carolina	3–7	1–4	T–8th			
1936	South Carolina	5–7	2–5	12th			
1937	South Carolina	5–6–1	2–2–1	7th			
Rex Enright (Southern Conference) (1938–1942)
1938	South Carolina	6–4–1	2–2	T–6th			
1939	South Carolina	3–6–1	1–3	T–11th			
1940	South Carolina	3–6	1–3	T–12th			
1941	South Carolina	4–4–1	4–0–1	2nd			
1942	South Carolina	1–7–1	1–4	14th			
James Moran Sr. (Southern Conference) (1943)
1943	South Carolina	5–2	2–1	3rd			
Williams Newton (Southern Conference) (1944)
1944	South Carolina	3–4–2	1–3	7th			
John D. McMillan (Southern Conference) (1945)
1945	South Carolina	2–4–3	0–3–2	10th	L Gator		
Rex Enright (Southern Conference) (1946–1952)
1946	South Carolina	5–3	4–2	4th			
1947	South Carolina	6–2–1	4–1–1	3rd			
1948	South Carolina	3–5	1–3	13th			
1949	South Carolina	4–6	3–3	T–7th			
1950	South Carolina	3–4–2	2–4–1	12th			
1951	South Carolina	5–4	5–3	T–7th			
1952	South Carolina	5–5	2–4	T–10th			
Rex Enright (Atlantic Coast Conference) (1953–1955)
1953	South Carolina	7–3	2–3	T–3rd			
1954	South Carolina	6–4	3–3	4th			
1955	South Carolina	3–6	1–5	T–6th			
Warren Giese (Atlantic Coast Conference) (1956–1960)
1956	South Carolina	7–3	5–2	3rd			
1957	South Carolina	5–5	2–5	7th			
1958	South Carolina	7–3	5–2	2nd			15
1959	South Carolina	6–4	4–3	5th			
1960	South Carolina	3–6	3–3	5th			
Marvin Bass (Atlantic Coast Conference) (1961–1965)
1961	South Carolina	4–6	3–4	T–5th			
1962	South Carolina	4–5–1	3–4	T–4th			
1963	South Carolina	1–8–1	1–5–1	6th			
1964	South Carolina	3–5–2	2–3–1	6th			
1965	South Carolina	5–5 (Note: The Gamecocks finished the season with an overall record of 5–5 with a mark of 4–2 in conference play, sharing the ACC title with Duke. In July 1966, the ACC ruled that South Carolina had used two ineligible players during the 1965 season and required the Gamecocks to forfeit their four conference victories and share of the conference title. Clemson and NC State, who both lost to South Carolina, had finished tied for third in the ACC with 4–3 records. After the forfeits from South Carolina, Clemson and NC State improved to 5–2 in conference play and were declared ACC co-champions. Duke dropped to third place. NCAA and South Carolina records still reflect the Gamecocks' original win–loss marks prior to the forfeits.)	4–2	1st			
Paul Dietzel (Atlantic Coast Conference) (1966–1970)
1966	South Carolina	1–9	1–3	7th			
1967	South Carolina	5–5	4–2	3rd			
1968	South Carolina	4–6	4–3	4th			
1969	South Carolina	7–4	6–0	1st	L Peach		
1970	South Carolina	4–6–1	3–2–1	4th			
Paul Dietzel (Independent) (1971–1974)
1971	South Carolina	6–5					
1972	South Carolina	4–7					
1973	South Carolina	7–4					
1974	South Carolina	4–7					
Jim Carlen (Independent) (1975–1981)
1975	South Carolina	7–5			L Tangerine		
1976	South Carolina	6–5					
1977	South Carolina	5–7					
1978	South Carolina	5–5–1					
1979	South Carolina	8–4			L Hall of Fame Classic		
1980	South Carolina	8–4			L Gator		
1981	South Carolina	6–6					
Richard Bell (Independent) (1982)
1982	South Carolina	4–7					
Joe Morrison (Independent) (1983–1988)
1983	South Carolina	5–6					
1984	South Carolina	10–2			L Gator	13	11
1985	South Carolina	5–6					
1986	South Carolina	3–6–2					
1987	South Carolina	8–4			L Gator	15	15
1988	South Carolina	8–4			L Liberty		
Sparky Woods (Independent) (1989–1991)
1989	South Carolina	6–4–1					
1990	South Carolina	6–5					
1991	South Carolina	3–6–2					
Sparky Woods (Southeastern Conference) (1992–1993)
1992	South Carolina	5–6	3–5	4th (Eastern)			
1993	South Carolina	5–6	2–6	T–4th (Eastern)			
Brad Scott (Southeastern Conference) (1994–1998)
1994	South Carolina	7–5	4–4	3rd (Eastern)	W Carquest		
1995	South Carolina	4–6–1	2–5–1	4th (Eastern)			
1996	South Carolina	6–5	4–4	3rd (Eastern)			
1997	South Carolina	5–6	3–5	4th (Eastern)			
1998	South Carolina	1–10	0–8	6th (Eastern)			
Lou Holtz (Southeastern Conference) (1999–2004)
1999	South Carolina	0–11	0–8	6th (Eastern)			
2000	South Carolina	8–4	5–3	2nd (Eastern)	W Outback	21	19
2001	South Carolina	9–3	5–3	3rd (Eastern)	W Outback	13	13
2002	South Carolina	5–7	3–5	4th (Eastern)			
2003	South Carolina	5–7	2–6	4th (Eastern)			
2004	South Carolina	6–5	4–4	3rd (Eastern)			
Steve Spurrier (Southeastern Conference) (2005–2015)
2005	South Carolina	7–5	5–3	T–2nd (Eastern)	L Independence		
2006	South Carolina	8–5	3–5	5th (Eastern)	W Liberty		
2007	South Carolina	6–6	3–5	T–4th (Eastern)			
2008	South Carolina	7–6	4–4	T–3rd (Eastern)	L Outback		
2009	South Carolina	7–6	3–5	T–4th (Eastern)	L PapaJohns.com		
2010	South Carolina	9–5	5–3	1st (Eastern)	L Chick-fil-A	22	22
2011	South Carolina	11–2	6–2	2nd (Eastern)	W Capital One	8	9
2012	South Carolina	11–2	6–2	3rd (Eastern)	W Outback	7	8
2013	South Carolina	11–2	6–2	2nd (Eastern)	W Capital One	4	4
2014	South Carolina	7–6	3–5	T–4th (Eastern)	W Independence		
2015	South Carolina (Note: On October 13, 2015, Steve Spurrier officially announced his resignation as head football coach, and co-offensive coordinator Shawn Elliott was named interim head coach for the remaining games of the season.)	3–9	1–7	T–6th (Eastern)			
Will Muschamp (Southeastern Conference) (2016–2020)
2016	South Carolina	6–7	3–5	T–5th (Eastern)	L Birmingham		
2017	South Carolina	9–4	5–3	2nd (Eastern)	W Outback		
2018	South Carolina	7–6	4–4	T–4th (Eastern)	L Belk		
2019	South Carolina	4–8	3–5	T–4th (Eastern)			
2020	South Carolina (Note: Muschamp was fired with three games remaining; Mike Bobo finished out the season.)	2–8	2–8	6th (Eastern)			
Shane Beamer (Southeastern Conference) (2021–present)
2021	South Carolina	7–6	3–5	T-4th (Eastern)	W Duke's Mayo		
2022	South Carolina	8–5	4–4	3rd (Eastern)	L Gator	23	23
2023	South Carolina	5–7	3–5	T–4th (Eastern)			
2024	South Carolina	9–4	5–3	T–4th	L Citrus	19	19
2025	South Carolina	4–8	1–7	T–13th			
Total:		653–621–44					
National championship Conference title Conference division title or championship game berth
^{†}Indicates Bowl Coalition, Bowl Alliance, BCS, or CFP / New Years' Six bowl.; ^{#}Rankings from final Coaches Poll.
