= North Carolina–South Carolina football rivalry =

American college football rivalry

Battle of the Carolinas
- North Carolina Tar Heels South Carolina Gamecocks
- First meeting: October 10, 1903; North Carolina, 17–0
- Latest meeting: September 2, 2023; North Carolina, 31–17

Statistics
- Total meetings: 60
- All-time series: North Carolina leads, 36–20–4
- Largest victory: North Carolina, 48–0 (1914)
- Longest win streak: North Carolina, 5 (1903–1911); South Carolina, 5 (1967–1974)
- Current win streak: North Carolina, 1 (2023)

Locations of North Carolina and South Carolina.

The North Carolina–South Carolina football rivalry, also known as the Battle of the Carolinas, is an American college football rivalry between the North Carolina Tar Heels football team of the University of North Carolina at Chapel Hill and South Carolina Gamecocks football team of the University of South Carolina. North Carolina leads the series 36–20–4 through the 2023 season.

== Series history ==
The series started in 1903 with a win for North Carolina in Columbia, South Carolina. This began the Tarheels' longest win streak which ended in 1911, tied with South Carolina for five games. The Gamecocks' longest win streak began in 1967 and ended in 1974, after which South Carolina leads the matchup with the majority of North Carolina’s wins in this series coming from the earlier decades of the matchup. The teams most met most recently in 2023 in Charlotte, North Carolina for College GameDay with North Carolina winning 31–17. Both schools announced a home and home series for the years 2028 and 2029. The Tar Heels will travel to Columbia, South Carolina in 2028, and The Gamecocks will play in Chapel Hill, North Carolina the following year. On May 22, 2026, both schools announced the cancellation of the home and home series that was scheduled for 2028 and 2029.

== Geography ==
Being close geographically, both teams compete for recruits on an annual basis. North Carolina has pulled players such as Robert Quinn and Quinshad Davis out of South Carolina in recent years. South Carolina has done the same by recruiting Larenz Bryant and Connor Mitch from North Carolina. Proximity also plays a role because in some areas of the two states there are significant populations of fans for each team. For example, Charlotte, North Carolina is closer to Columbia than Chapel Hill. Location can lead to ". . .families with Gamecocks and Tar Heels split down the middle. Couples where the man bleeds Carolina Blue, and the woman is all about the Garnet and Black. The fight, when it is present, is very real."

== The usage of "Carolina" ==
Both North and South Carolina make use of "Carolina" as a moniker. From 1999 to 2004, North Carolina had "Carolina Tar Heels" written on its interlocking N and C logo. South Carolina uses only a "C", which is used to start the title "Carolina". The official color of UNC is "Carolina Blue", which is an officially licensed color. Both schools use end zones painted with the title "Carolina" and "Tar Heels" or "Gamecocks" across them. Both schools use the script "Carolina" on a number of their sports uniforms. Both have the moniker trademarked.

North Carolina fans argue that it was the first public university in America, and claimed the nickname first. Also, the Province of Carolina was founded in what is modern day North Carolina.

South Carolina fans argue that after Carolina split, South Carolina became a state first as well as the fact that the principal seat of government of the Province of Carolina was located in Charles Town, now modern day Charleston, South Carolina.

Both schools have referred to themselves as simply "Carolina", even when playing each other.

== Gamecocks leave the ACC ==
North Carolina and South Carolina spent 49 years in the same athletic conferences, first in the Southern Conference and later in the Atlantic Coast Conference, until the Gamecocks left the ACC to become independent in 1971. The reason for South Carolina's departure was the academic standards the ACC held. Particularly the 800 rule, which mandated applicants score an 800 on the SAT. USC wanted a lower academic eligibility standard to help with recruiting and eligibility. USC also didn’t like was how much control and influence UNC and the other North Carolina schools had on the ACC and former North Carolina turned Gamecock basketball coach Frank McGuire's displeasure with conference officials who he felt were biased in favor of the "Tobacco Road" schools.

== Game results ==
North Carolina victories	South Carolina victories	Tie games

No.	Date	Location	Winning team		Losing team	
1	October 10, 1903	Columbia, SC	North Carolina	17	South Carolina	0
2	October 15, 1904	Chapel Hill, NC	North Carolina	27	South Carolina	0
3	November 18, 1908	Chapel Hill, NC	North Carolina	22	South Carolina	0
4	November 19, 1910	Durham, NC	North Carolina	27	South Carolina	6
5	November 11, 1911	Chapel Hill, NC	North Carolina	21	South Carolina	0
6	November 9, 1912	Chapel Hill, NC	Tie	6	Tie	6
7	October 10, 1913	Columbia, SC	North Carolina	13	South Carolina	3
8	October 12, 1914	Chapel Hill, NC	North Carolina	48	South Carolina	0
9	October 16, 1920	Chapel Hill, NC	North Carolina	7	South Carolina	0
10	October 15, 1921	Columbia, SC	Tie	7	Tie	7
11	October 14, 1922	Chapel Hill, NC	North Carolina	10	South Carolina	7
12	November 3, 1923	Columbia, SC	North Carolina	13	South Carolina	0
13	November 1, 1924	Columbia, SC	South Carolina	10	North Carolina	7
14	October 3, 1925	Chapel Hill, NC	North Carolina	7	South Carolina	0
15	October 9, 1926	Chapel Hill, NC	North Carolina	7	South Carolina	0
16	October 15, 1927	Chapel Hill, NC	South Carolina	14	North Carolina	6
17	November 10, 1928	Columbia, SC	Tie	0	Tie	0
18	November 19, 1929	Chapel Hill, NC	North Carolina	40	South Carolina	0
19	November 21, 1936	Columbia, SC	North Carolina	14	South Carolina	0
20	September 25, 1937	Chapel Hill, NC	Tie	13	Tie	13
21	September 27, 1941	Chapel Hill, NC	South Carolina	13	North Carolina	7
22	October 3, 1942	Columbia, SC	North Carolina	13	South Carolina	7
23	November 6, 1943	Chapel Hill, NC	North Carolina	21	South Carolina	6
24	November 4, 1944	Columbia, SC	South Carolina	6	North Carolina	0
25	October 8, 1949	Chapel Hill, NC	#6 North Carolina	28	South Carolina	13
26	November 18, 1950	Columbia, SC	North Carolina	14	South Carolina	7
27	October 13, 1951	Chapel Hill, NC	North Carolina	21	South Carolina	6
28	November 15, 1952	Columbia, SC	North Carolina	27	South Carolina	19
29	November 7, 1953	Columbia, SC	South Carolina	18	North Carolina	0
30	November 6, 1954	Columbia, SC	North Carolina	21	South Carolina	19
31	November 5, 1955	Norfolk, VA	North Carolina	32	South Carolina	14

No.	Date	Location	Winning team		Losing team	
32	October 6, 1956	Columbia, SC	South Carolina	14	North Carolina	0
33	November 9, 1957	Columbia, SC	North Carolina	28	South Carolina	6
34	October 11, 1958	Chapel Hill, NC	North Carolina	6	South Carolina	0
35	October 10, 1959	Chapel Hill, NC	North Carolina	19	#11 South Carolina	6
36	October 22, 1960	Columbia, SC	South Carolina	22	North Carolina	6
37	October 21, 1961	Chapel Hill, NC	North Carolina	17	South Carolina	0
38	October 20, 1962	Columbia, SC	North Carolina	19	South Carolina	14
39	October 26, 1963	Chapel Hill, NC	North Carolina	7	South Carolina	0
40	October 24, 1964	Columbia, SC	North Carolina	24	South Carolina	6
41	September 23, 1967	Chapel Hill, NC	South Carolina	16	North Carolina	10
42	September 28, 1968	Columbia, SC	South Carolina	32	North Carolina	27
43	September 27, 1969	Chapel Hill, NC	South Carolina	14	North Carolina	6
44	October 10, 1970	Chapel Hill, NC	South Carolina	35	#18 North Carolina	21
45	October 26, 1974	Columbia, SC	South Carolina	31	North Carolina	23
46	October 22, 1977	Chapel Hill, NC	North Carolina	17	South Carolina	0
47	October 28, 1978	Columbia, SC	North Carolina	24	South Carolina	22
48	September 8, 1979	Chapel Hill, NC	North Carolina	28	South Carolina	0
49	October 24, 1981	Chapel Hill, NC	South Carolina	31	#3 North Carolina	13
50	September 3, 1983	Columbia, SC	#11 North Carolina	24	South Carolina	8
51	September 3, 1988	Columbia, SC	#19 South Carolina	31	North Carolina	10
52	November 11, 1989	Chapel Hill, NC	South Carolina	27	North Carolina	20
53	September 8, 1990	Columbia, SC	South Carolina	27	North Carolina	5
54	November 16, 1991	Chapel Hill, NC	North Carolina	21	South Carolina	17
55	October 3, 2007	Chapel Hill, NC	#7 South Carolina	21	North Carolina	15
56	August 29, 2013	Columbia, SC	#6 South Carolina	27	North Carolina	10
57	September 3, 2015	Charlotte, NC	South Carolina	17	North Carolina	13
58	August 31, 2019	Charlotte, NC	North Carolina	24	South Carolina	20
59	December 30, 2021	Charlotte, NC	South Carolina	38	North Carolina	21
60	September 2, 2023	Charlotte, NC	#21 North Carolina	31	South Carolina	17
Series: North Carolina leads 36–20–4

== See also ==
- List of NCAA college football rivalry games
