= Tiyon Evans =

American football player (born 2001)

Profile
- Position: Running back

Personal information
- Born: June 17, 2001 (age 25); Hartsville, South Carolina, U.S.
- Listed height: 5 ft 11 in (1.80 m)
- Listed weight: 225 lb (102 kg)

Career information
- High school: Hartsville (Hartsville, South Carolina)
- College: Hutchinson (2019–2020); Tennessee (2021); Louisville (2022)
- NFL draft: 2023: undrafted

Career history
- Los Angeles Rams (2023)*; Carolina Panthers (2023)*; Houston Roughnecks (2024); Calgary Stampeders (2025)*; Massachusetts Pirates (2025); Montreal Alouettes (2025)
- * Offseason or practice squad member only

Career CFL statistics as of 2025
- Rushing yards: 31
- Receptions: 2
- Receiving yards: 9
- Stats at CFL.ca
- Stats at Pro Football Reference

Tiyon Evans Jr. (born March 13, 2001) is an American professional football running back. He played college football for the Hutchinson Blue Dragons, Tennessee Volunteers and the Louisville Cardinals. Evans has been a member of the Calgary Stampeders. He has also spent time with the Los Angeles Rams and the Carolina Panthers of the National Football League (NFL), the Houston Roughnecks of the United Football League (UFL) and the Massachusetts Pirates of the Indoor Football League (IFL).

== College career ==
Evans played college football for the Hutchinson Blue Dragons in 2019, Tennessee Volunteers in 2021 and the Louisville Cardinals in 2022. He played in 12 games for Hutchinson, rushing for 538 yards, nine touchdowns and adding four receptions for 43 yards and a receiving touchdown. Evans was also the primary kick returner with 608 total yards and two kicks returned for touchdowns.

On November 20, 2020, Evans committed to University of Tennessee. He was limited for most of spring practice but despite this, he rushed for 525 yards and scored six rushing touchdowns as well as four catches for 74 yards and one score, before he was shut down due to an injury. On November 26, 2021, he entered the transfer portal for a second time. On December 6, 2021, Evans committed to University of Louisville.

Evans played in eight games for Louisville, rushing for 525 yards and six touchdowns. He also had six catches for 13 yards. Following the 2022 season, Evans opted to enter the 2023 NFL draft.

=== College statistics ===
Legend
**Bold**	Career high

Year	Team	Games		Rushing				Receiving			
Year	Team	GP	GS	Att	Yds	Avg	TD	Rec	Yds	Avg	TD
2019	Hutchinson	12	—	61	538	8.8	9	4	43	10.8	1
2020	Hutchinson	Season cancelled									
2021	Tennessee	7	2	81	525	6.5	6	4	74	18.5	1
2022	Louisville	8	6	83	525	6.3	6	6	13	2.2	0
NJCAA Career		12	—	61	538	8.8	9	4	43	10.8	1
FBS Career		15	8	164	1,050	6.4	12	10	87	8.7	1

== Professional career ==
Pre-draft measurables
Height	Weight	Arm length	Hand span	40-yard dash	10-yard split	20-yard split	Vertical jump	Broad jump	Bench press
5 ft 9 1/2 in (1.77 m)	225 lb (102 kg)	30 3/8 in (0.77 m)	8 1/2 in (0.22 m)	4.52 s	1.59 s	2.50 s	30.5 in (0.77 m)	9 ft 5 in (2.87 m)	20 reps
All values from NFL Combine/Pro Day

=== Los Angeles Rams ===
After not being selected in the 2023 NFL draft, Evans signed with the Los Angeles Rams as an undrafted free agent. He was waived on June 7, 2023.

=== Carolina Panthers ===
On June 8, 2023, Evans was claimed off waived by the Carolina Panthers. He was released on July 28, 2023.

=== Houston Roughnecks ===
On December 22, 2023, Evans signed with the Houston Roughnecks of the newly merged United Football League (UFL). He played in four games, rushing for five yards and catching two passes for 34 yards. Evans was released on May 20, 2024.

=== Calgary Stampeders ===
Evans signed with the Calgary Stampeders of the Canadian Football League (CFL) on March 19, 2025. He was released on June 1, 2025, as part of final roster cuts.

=== Massachusetts Pirates ===
On June 11, 2025, Evans signed with Massachusetts Pirates of the Indoor Football League (IFL). He played one game against the Iowa Barnstormers, rushing for 66 yards, one touchdown and one reception for eight yards and a touchdown.

=== Montreal Alouettes ===
On September 16, 2025, Evans was signed to the Montreal Alouettes practice roster. He was activated on October 24, 2025, and made his first start the following day against the Winnipeg Blue Bombers. Evans rushed seven times for 31 yards and caught two passes for nine yards. He was placed back on the practice roster on October 30, 2025. He became a free agent after the 2025 season.
