= 2021 Duke's Mayo Bowl =

Postseason college football bowl game

- 20th Duke's Mayo Bowl
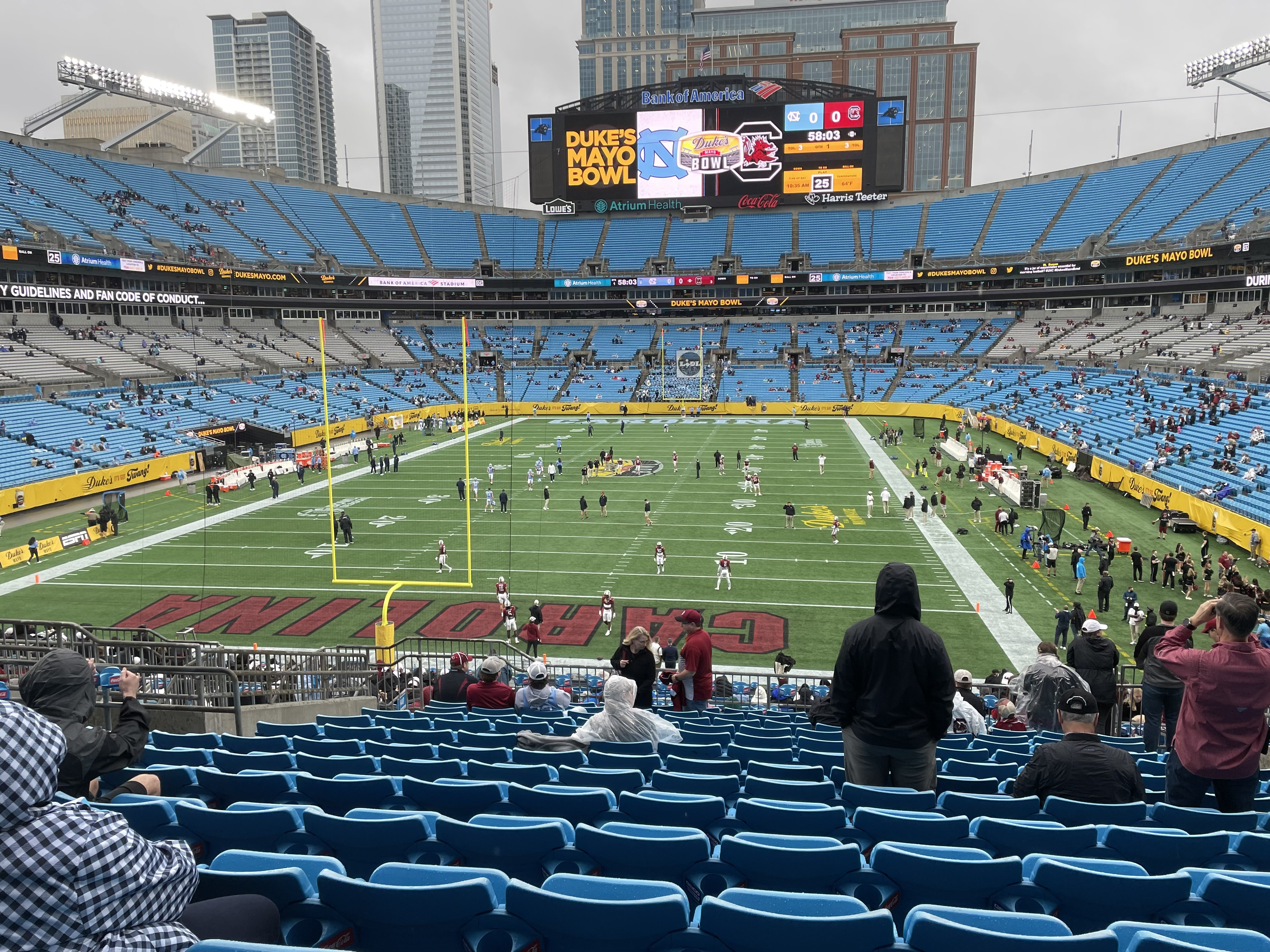
- Both teams warming up on the field before the game
North Carolina Tar Heels	South Carolina Gamecocks
(6–6)	(6–6)
ACC	SEC
21	38
Head coach: Mack Brown	Head coach: Shane Beamer
	1	2	3	4	Total
North Carolina	0	13	8	0	21
South Carolina	18	7	7	6	38
- Date: December 30, 2021
- Season: 2021
- Stadium: Bank of America Stadium
- Location: Charlotte, North Carolina
- MVP: Dakereon Joyner (WR, South Carolina)
- Favorite: North Carolina by 7
- Referee: Reggie Smith (Big Ten)
- Attendance: 45,520

United States TV coverage
- Network: ESPN
- Announcers: Anish Shroff (play-by-play), Mike Golic Jr. (analyst), and Taylor McGregor (sideline)

The 2021 Duke's Mayo Bowl was a college football bowl game played on December 30, 2021, at Bank of America Stadium in Charlotte, North Carolina. The 20th edition of the Duke's Mayo Bowl, and the second under its current name, the contest featured the North Carolina Tar Heels of the Atlantic Coast Conference and the South Carolina Gamecocks of the Southeastern Conference. The game began at 11:30 a.m. EST and was televised on ESPN. It was one of the 2021–22 bowl games concluding the 2021 FBS football season. Duke's Mayonnaise served as the game's title sponsor.

South Carolina defeated North Carolina with a final score of 38–21, winning its first bowl game since 2017. South Carolina kicker Parker White became the program’s all-time leader in points.

== Teams ==
This was the 20th edition of the game, though only the second under its current name; the bowl had previously gone by three other names since its inauguration in 2002. Consistent with conference tie-ins, the game featured the North Carolina Tar Heels from the Atlantic Coast Conference (ACC) and the South Carolina Gamecocks from the Southeastern Conference (SEC). This was the 59th meeting between North Carolina and South Carolina, who spent 1953 to 1970 in the ACC together; entering the game, the Tar Heels led the all-time series, 35–19–4. The teams' last met in a pair of season-opening contests in 2015, won by South Carolina, and 2019, won by North Carolina; both games were also played at Bank of America Stadium in Charlotte. Additionally, the teams are scheduled to meet again in Charlotte in 2023 and have scheduled a home-and-home series for 2028 and 2029. This was North Carolina's 36th overall bowl game appearance and their fifth in this particular game, having competed in 2004, 2008, 2009 and 2013. South Carolina made their 24th overall bowl game appearance and their second in this particular game, with their lone previous appearance coming in 2018.

=== North Carolina Tar Heels ===
North Carolina finished their regular season with an overall 6–6 record, 3–5 in ACC games. After starting with two wins in their first three games, the team alternated losses and wins for the rest of the season. The Tar Heels played four ranked teams, losing to Notre Dame, Pittsburgh, and NC State while defeating Wake Forest.

=== South Carolina Gamecocks ===
South Carolina also finished their regular season with an overall 6–6 record, 3–5 in SEC games. After starting with two wins followed by two losses, the team alternated wins and losses for the rest of the season. The Gamecocks played three ranked teams, losing to Georgia, Texas A&M, and Clemson.

== Game summary ==
2021 Duke's Mayo Bowl

Quarter	1	2	3	4	Total
North Carolina	0	13	8	0	21
South Carolina	18	7	7	6	38

at Bank of America Stadium • Charlotte, North Carolina

- Date: Thursday, December 30, 2021
- Game time: 11:30 a.m. EST
- Game weather: Rain • Temperature: 68 °F (20 °C) • Wind: SW 7 mph
- Referee: Reggie Smith
- TV announcers (ESPN): Anish Shroff (play-by-play), Mike Golic Jr. (analyst), and Taylor McGregor (sideline)
- Box score

Scoring summary

Quarter	Time	Drive			Team	Scoring information	Score	
Quarter	Time	Plays	Yards	TOP	Team	Scoring information	North Carolina	South Carolina
1	10:15	3	93	1:46	South Carolina	Jaheim Bell 69-yard touchdown reception from Dakereon Joyner, Parker White kick good	0	7
1	7:45	3	78	1:24	South Carolina	Jaheim Bell 66-yard touchdown reception from Zeb Noland, 2-point pass good	0	15
1	0:27	9	54	5:14	South Carolina	30-yard field goal by Parker White	0	18
2	13:11	6	75	2:16	North Carolina	British Brooks 63-yard touchdown run, Grayson Atkins kick good	7	18
2	5:44	8	50	3:30	North Carolina	40-yard field goal by Grayson Atkins	10	18
2	2:27	6	75	3:17	South Carolina	Juju McDowell 35-yard touchdown run, Parker White kick good	10	25
2	0:44	8	56	1:43	North Carolina	36-yard field goal by Grayson Atkins	13	25
3	9:53	9	75	5:07	South Carolina	Kevin Harris 1-yard touchdown run, Parker White kick good	13	32
3	7:24	6	75	2:29	North Carolina	Garrett Walston 37-yard touchdown reception from Sam Howell, 2-point run good	21	32
4	7:44	11	77	6:20	South Carolina	22-yard field goal by Parker White	21	35
4	0:50	10	61	5:02	South Carolina	33-yard field goal by Parker White	21	38
"TOP" = time of possession. For other American football terms, see Glossary of American football.							21	38

== Statistics ==
=== Team statistics ===
Team statistical comparison
Statistic	North Carolina	South Carolina
First downs	14	27
First downs rushing	5	17
First downs passing	9	9
First downs penalty	0	1
Third down efficiency	1–10	6–11
Fourth down efficiency	1–1	0–0
Total plays–net yards	50–333	66–543
Rushing attempts–net yards	29–128	51–301
Yards per rush	4.4	5.9
Yards passing	205	242
Pass completions–attempts	12–21	12–15
Interceptions thrown	0	0
Punt returns–total yards	0–0	1–(−7)
Kickoff returns–total yards	1–16	0–0
Punts–average yardage	5–46.6	2–41.5
Fumbles–lost	1–0	1–0
Penalties–yards	4–37	4–20
Time of possession	20:58	39:02

=== Individual statistics ===
North Carolina statistics
Tar Heels passing
	C–A	Yds	TD–INT
Sam Howell	12–20	205	1–0
Drake Maye	0–1	0	0–0
Tar Heels rushing
	Car	Yds	TD
British Brooks	5	72	1
Ty Chandler	9	29	0
Drake Maye	2	24	0
Sam Howell	13	3	0
Tar Heels receiving
	Rec	Yds	TD
Antoine Green	4	73	0
Josh Downs	3	62	0
Garrett Walston	1	37	1
Bryson Nesbit	2	29	0
Stephen Gosnell	1	3	0
Ty Chandler	1	1	0

South Carolina statistics
Gamecocks passing
	C–A	Yds	TD–INT
Dakereon Joyner	9–9	160	1–0
Zeb Noland	3–6	82	1–0
Gamecocks rushing
	Car	Yds	TD
Kevin Harris	31	182	1
Dakereon Joyner	10	64	0
Juju McDowell	5	52	1
Jaheim Bell	3	21	0
Zeb Noland	1	−9	0
O'Mega Blake	1	−9	0
Gamecocks receiving
	Rec	Yds	TD
Jaheim Bell	5	159	2
Ahmarean Brown	4	61	0
Juju McDowell	1	8	0
E. J. Jenkins	1	7	0
Xavier Legette	1	7	0

== See also ==
- North Carolina–South Carolina football rivalry
