= Luke Doty =

American football player (born 2001)

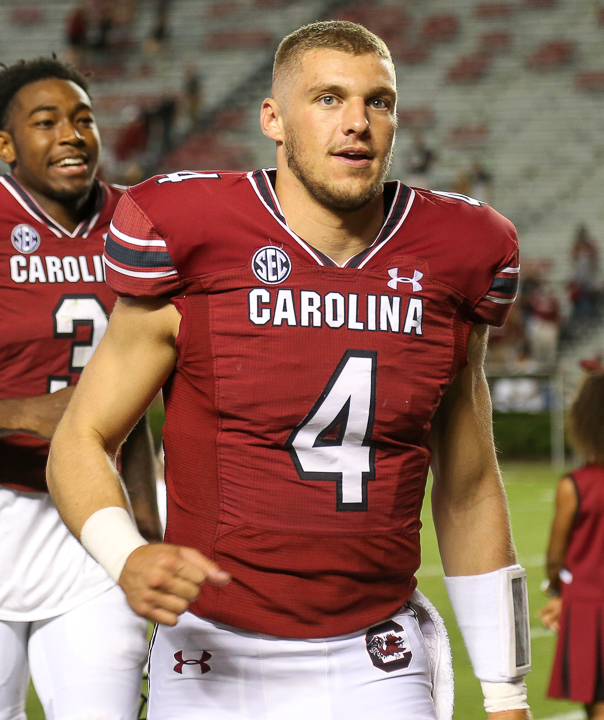
- Doty with the South Carolina Gamecocks in 2021

South Carolina Gamecocks
- Position: Defensive assistant / defensive backs coach

Personal information
- Born: October 26, 2001 (age 25)
- Listed height: 6 ft 1 in (1.85 m)
- Listed weight: 210 lb (95 kg)

Career information
- High school: Myrtle Beach (Myrtle Beach, South Carolina)
- College: South Carolina (2020–2025)
- Stats at ESPN

Lucas Robinson Doty (born October 26, 2001) is an American college football coach and former wide receiver and quarterback for the South Carolina Gamecocks.

== Early life ==
Doty attended Myrtle Beach High School where he was named South Carolina's Mr. Football in 2019. In his senior year, he totaled 1,876 passing yards and 25 passing touchdowns, with an additional 408 rushing yards and 4 rushing touchdowns.

Doty committed to South Carolina after receiving 19 offers, including offers from Auburn and North Carolina.

College recruiting
Name	Hometown	School	Height	Weight	Commit date
Luke Doty; QB	Myrtle Beach, SC	Myrtle Beach	6 ft 1 in (1.85 m)	210 lb (95 kg)	Jul 31, 2018
Luke Doty; QB	Recruit ratings: Scout: Rivals: 247Sports: ESPN: (84)				
Overall recruit ranking: Scout: 4 (dual-threat quarterback) Rivals: 2 (pro-style QB) 247Sports: 4 (pro-style QB) ESPN: 4 (dual-threat quarterback)
Note: In many cases, Scout, Rivals, 247Sports, On3, and ESPN may conflict in their listings of height and weight.; In these cases, the average was taken. ESPN grades are on a 100-point scale.; Sources: "South Carolina Football Commitments". Rivals.; "2020 South Carolina Football Commits". Scout.; "ESPN". ESPN.; "Scout.com Team Recruiting Rankings". Scout.; "2020 Team Ranking". Rivals.com.

== College career ==
=== 2020 ===
Doty appeared in 7 games. He completed 43 of 71 passes for 2 touchdowns and 3 interceptions. He also rushed for 91 yards.

Doty originally only appeared in a specific package of plays designed for him, but took over as the starter for the final two games of the 2020 season.

=== 2021 ===
Doty injured his foot in the offseason, so he did not play in the first two games, instead serving as a backup to Zeb Noland. Doty later took over during the game against Georgia. He started the next four games, but then suffered a season-ending injury. Noland, Jason Brown, and Dakereon Joyner would start at quarterback the remainder of the 2021 season.

=== 2022 ===
Doty appeared sparingly in 2022, serving as the primary backup to transfer Spencer Rattler. He appeared in a relief role in three games.

=== 2023 ===
Doty also served as backup to Rattler in 2023 while contributing 1 rushing touchdown and 1 receiving touchdown. Doty transitioned during the season to wide receiver catching 13 passes for 123 yards and 1 touchdown.

=== 2024 ===
Doty contributed primarily as a receiver during the 2024 season.

=== 2025 ===
Doty is currently competing for the backup quarterback role to starter LaNorris Sellers during spring 2025.

=== Statistics ===
Season	Team	Games			Passing								Rushing				Receiving			
Season	Team	GP	GS	Record (Note: Accounts for only GS as a QB. In 2023 and 2024, Doty started games at WR.)	Cmp	Att	Pct	Yds	Y/A	TD	Int	Rtg	Att	Yds	Avg	TD	Rec	Yds	Avg	TD
2020	South Carolina	8	2	0–2	43	71	60.6	405	5.7	2	3	109.3	41	91	2.2	0				
2021	South Carolina	6	4	2–2	86	143	60.1	975	6.8	5	3	124.8	34	19	0.6	0				
2022	South Carolina	5	0	—	10	14	71.4	146	10.4	2	2	177.6	5	63	12.6	1				
2023	South Carolina	12	2	—	2	4	50.0	17	4.3	0	0	85.7	2	0	0.0	1	13	123	9.5	1
2024	South Carolina	11	1	—	Did not record pass or run attempt												3	17	5.7	0
2025	South Carolina	4	0	—	18	28	64.3	148	5.3	0	1	101.5	9	20	2.2	0	0	0	0.0	0
Career		46	9	2–4	159	260	61.2	1,691	6.5	9	9	120.3	91	193	2.1	2	16	140	8.8	1

== Personal life ==
Doty was born to Bobby and Melanie Doty. Both of his parents were athletes at Erskine College.

Doty also has a younger brother, Jake, who graduated from Myrtle Beach High School in 2022.
