= Will Sheppard =

American football player (born 2002)

No. 81 – Miami Dolphins
- Position: Wide receiver
- Roster status: Practice squad

Personal information
- Born: February 11, 2002 (age 24); Ruston, Louisiana, U.S.
- Listed height: 6 ft 3 in (1.91 m)
- Listed weight: 196 lb (89 kg)

Career information
- High school: Mandeville (Mandeville, Louisiana)
- College: Vanderbilt (2020–2023); Colorado (2024)
- NFL draft: 2025: undrafted

Career history
- Green Bay Packers (2025); Miami Dolphins (2026–present)*
- * Offseason or practice squad member only

Awards and highlights
- Second-team All-SEC (2022)
- Stats at Pro Football Reference

William Miles Sheppard (born February 11, 2002) is an American professional football wide receiver for the Miami Dolphins of the National Football League (NFL). He played college football for the Vanderbilt Commodores and Colorado Buffaloes.

== Early life ==
Sheppard was born in Ruston, Louisiana, and attended Mandeville High School. In Sheppard's high school career, he hauled in 126 receptions for 2,252 yards, and 33 touchdowns. Sheppard committed to play college football at Vanderbilt.

== College career ==
=== Vanderbilt ===
In Sheppard's first season in 2020, he caught two passes for 30 yards. In week 5 of the 2021 season, he racked up eight receptions for 119 yards and two touchdowns in a 30–28 win over UConn. Sheppard took a step up in the 2021 season, finishing the year with 43 receptions for 577 yards and four touchdowns. In week 3 of the 2022 season, he tallied ten receptions for 171 yards and two touchdowns in a win over Northern Illinois. Sheppard finished his breakout 2022 season with 60 receptions for 776 yards and nine touchdowns, earning second-team all-SEC honors.

Ahead of the 2023 season, Sheppard was named preseason second-team all-SEC and a member of the Fred Biletnikoff Award watchlist. In the season opener, he hauled in six passes for 68 yards and two touchdowns in a 35–28 win over Hawaii. On December 3, 2023, Sheppard announced that he would be entering the transfer portal.

=== Colorado ===
On December 14, 2023, Sheppard announced that he would be transferring to Colorado.

== Professional career ==
Pre-draft measurables
Height	Weight	Arm length	Hand span	40-yard dash	10-yard split	20-yard split	20-yard shuttle	Vertical jump	Broad jump
6 ft 2 3/4 in (1.90 m)	203 lb (92 kg)	32 in (0.81 m)	10 in (0.25 m)	4.59 s	1.58 s	2.64 s	4.31 s	40.5 in (1.03 m)	10 ft 6 in (3.20 m)
All values from Pro Day

After going unselected in the 2025 NFL draft, Sheppard was originally set to sign with the Tampa Bay Buccaneers as an undrafted free agent. However, his contract offer was rescinded following a failed physical on May 9, 2025. Sheppard would later participate as a rookie tryout in the Denver Broncos minicamp, but was not signed.

=== Green Bay Packers ===
On July 21, 2025, Sheppard signed with the Green Bay Packers. He was released on August 26 as part of final roster cuts and signed to the practice squad the next day. He was promoted to the active roster on November 26 and waived five days later. On December 3, Sheppard was re-signed to the practice squad. He signed a reserve/future contract with Green Bay on January 12, 2026.

On August 30, 2026, Sheppard was released by the Packers as a part of final roster cuts.

=== Miami Dolphins ===
On September 1, 2026, Sheppard signed with the Miami Dolphins practice squad.

== Personal life ==
Sheppard's younger brother Nate is a college football running back for the Duke Blue Devils.
