= 2021 Southeastern Conference football season =

- League: NCAA Division I FBS football season
- Sport: Football
- Duration: September 2 – December 4, 2021
- Games: 8
- Teams: 14
- TV partner(s): CBS, ESPN Family (ESPN, ESPN2, ESPNU, SEC Network, ESPN+)

2022 NFL draft
- Top draft pick: Travon Walker (Georgia)
- Picked by: Jacksonville Jaguars, 1st overall

Regular season
- East champions: Georgia
- West champions: Alabama

SEC Championship Game
- Date: December 4, 2021
- Venue: Mercedes-Benz Stadium, Atlanta, Georgia
- Champions: Alabama
- Runners-up: Georgia
- Finals MVP: Bryce Young, QB

SEC seasons
- 2020 2022

2021 Southeastern Conference football standings
	Conf.			Overall
Team	W		L	W		L
Eastern Division
No. 1 Georgia x#^	8	–	0	14	–	1
No. 18 Kentucky*	5	–	3	10	–	3
Tennessee	4	–	4	7	–	6
Missouri	3	–	5	6	–	7
South Carolina	3	–	5	7	–	6
Florida	2	–	6	6	–	7
Vanderbilt	0	–	8	2	–	10
Western Division
No. 2 Alabama x$^	7	–	1	13	–	2
No. 11 Ole Miss	6	–	2	10	–	3
No. 21 Arkansas	4	–	4	9	–	4
Mississippi State	4	–	4	7	–	6
Texas A&M	4	–	4	8	–	4
Auburn	3	–	5	6	–	7
LSU	3	–	5	6	–	7
Championship: Alabama 41, Georgia 24
# – College Football Playoff champion; ^ – College Football Playoff participant; $ – Conference champion; x – Division champion/co-champions; * – Kentucky vacated all wins due to NCAA violations.; Rankings from AP Poll

The 2021 Southeastern Conference football season was the 89th season of Southeastern Conference (SEC) football, taking place during the 2021 NCAA Division I FBS football season. The season began on September 2, 2021, and ended with the 2021 SEC Championship Game on December 4, 2021. The SEC is a Power Five conference under the College Football Playoff. The season schedule was released on January 27, 2021.

== Preseason ==
=== Recruiting classes ===
National rankings
Team	ESPN	Rivals	Scout & 24/7	Total signees
Alabama	#1	#2	#1	27
Arkansas	#26	#20	#23	25
Auburn	#9	#13	#11	21
Florida	#13	#8	#9	25
Georgia	#3	#2	#2	24
Kentucky	#30	#30	#34	22
LSU	#7	#3	#5	25
Ole Miss	#21	#22	#22	31
Mississippi State	#24	#24	#24	21
Missouri	#54	#48	#40	24
South Carolina	#19	#16	#21	24
Tennessee	#15	#12	#12	23
Texas A&M	#11	#6	#4	27
Vanderbilt	#60	#57	#69	20

=== SEC Media Days ===
The 2021 SEC Media days were held July 19–22, 2021 at the Hyatt Regency Birmingham – the Wynfrey Hotel in Hoover, Alabama. The Preseason Polls was released on July 23, 2021. Each team had their head coach available to talk to the media at the event. Coverage of the event was televised on SEC Network and ESPN.

==== Preseason media polls ====
East
Predicted finish	Team	Votes (1st place)
1	Georgia	923 (124)
2	Florida	784 (7)
3	Kentucky	624 (2)
4	Missouri	555
5	Tennessee	362
6	South Carolina	355 (1)
7	Vanderbilt	149

West
Predicted finish	Team	Votes (1st place)
1	Alabama	932 (130)
2	Texas A&M	760 (1)
3	LSU	633 (1)
4	Ole Miss	529 (1)
5	Auburn	440
6	Arkansas	241 (1)
7	Mississippi State	217

Media poll (SEC Championship)
Rank	Team	Votes
1	Alabama	84
2	Georgia	45
3	Ole Miss	1

=== Preseason awards ===
==== All−American Teams ====
	AP 1st Team	AP 2nd Team	WCFF 1st Team	WCFF 2nd Team	TSN 1st Team	TSN 2nd Team	ESPN	CBS 1st Team	CBS 2nd Team	CFN 1st Team	CFN 2nd Team	CFN HM	PFF 1st Team	PFF 3rd Team	PFF HM
Christopher Allen, LB, Alabama												✓			
Will Anderson Jr., LB, Alabama												✓			
Jordan Battle, DB, Alabama												✓			
Tank Bigsby, RB, Auburn												✓			
Treylon Burks, WR, Arkansas												✓			
Jake Camarda, P, Georgia												✓			
Anders Carlson, K, Auburn												✓			
Jalen Catalon, DB, Arkansas												✓			
Jordan Davis, DT, Georgia											✓				
Jerrion Ealy, RB, Ole Miss												✓			
Emil Ekiyor Jr., OL, Alabama												✓			
Kaiir Elam, CB, Florida										✓					
Kenyon Green, RB, Texas A&M															✓
Darian Kinnard, OT, Kentucky				✓					✓						
DeMarvin Leal, DL, Texas A&M															✓
John Metchie III, WR, Alabama												✓			
Arik Gilbert, TE, Georgia												✓		✓	
Christian Harris, LB, Alabama												✓			
Kevin Harris, RB, South Carolina												✓			
Josh Jobe, CB, Alabama										✓					
Mike Jones Jr., DL, LSU												✓			
Malachi Moore, DB, Alabama												✓			
Evan Neal, OT, Alabama												✓			
George Pickens, WR, Georgia											✓				
Will Reichard, K, Alabama	✓		✓		✓		✓	✓		✓			✓		
Eli Ricks, CB, LSU												✓			
Brian Robinson Jr., RB, Alabama												✓			
Jamaree Salyer, OT, Georgia						✓							✓		
Tykee Smith, DB, Georgia												✓			✓
Derek Stingley Jr., CB, LSU												✓			
Kobie Whiteside, DL, Missouri												✓			
Jalen Wydermyer, TE, Texas A&M												✓			
Cade York, K, LSU												✓			

==== Individual awards ====
Award	Head coach/player	School	Position	Link
Lott Trophy	Josh Jobe	Alabama	CB	
Dodd Trophy	Nick Saban	Alabama	HC	
Maxwell Award	Brian Robinson Jr.	Alabama	RB	
Maxwell Award	John Metchie III	Alabama	WR	
Maxwell Award	Bo Nix	Auburn	QB	
Maxwell Award	Tank Bigsby	Auburn	RB	
Maxwell Award	Chris Rodriguez Jr.	Kentucky	RB	
Maxwell Award	Kayshon Boutte	LSU	WR	
Maxwell Award	Matt Corral	Ole Miss	QB	
Maxwell Award	Jerrion Ealy	Ole Miss	RB	
Maxwell Award	Isaiah Spiller	Texas A&M	RB	
Bednarik Award	Will Anderson Jr.	Alabama	LB	
Bednarik Award	Josh Jobe	Alabama	CB	
Bednarik Award	Zakoby McClain	Auburn	LB	
Bednarik Award	Jordan Davis	Georgia	DT	
Bednarik Award	Nakobe Dean	Georgia	LB	
Bednarik Award	Derek Stingley Jr.	LSU	CB	
Bednarik Award	Eli Ricks	LSU	CB	
Bednarik Award	Emmanuel Forbes	Mississippi State	CB	
Bednarik Award	Trajan Jeffcoat	Missouri	DE	
Bednarik Award	DeMarvin Leal	Texas A&M	DL	
Bednarik Award	Anfernee Orji	Vanderbilt	LB	
Davey O'Brien Award	JT Daniels	Georgia	QB	
Davey O'Brien Award	Connor Bazelak	Missouri	QB	
Davey O'Brien Award	Matt Corral	Ole Miss	QB	
Doak Walker Award	Brian Robinson Jr.	Alabama	RB	
Doak Walker Award	Trelon Smith	Arkansas	RB	
Doak Walker Award	Tank Bigsby	Auburn	RB	
Doak Walker Award	Zamir White	Georgia	RB	
Doak Walker Award	Chris Rodriguez Jr.	Kentucky	RB	
Doak Walker Award	Dillon Johnson	Mississippi State	RB	
Doak Walker Award	Jo'Quavious Marks	Mississippi State	RB	
Doak Walker Award	Kevin Harris	South Carolina	RB	
Doak Walker Award	Jabari Small	Tennessee	RB	
Doak Walker Award	Isaiah Spiller	Texas A&M	RB	
Fred Biletnikoff Award	John Metchie III	Alabama	WR	
Fred Biletnikoff Award	Treylon Burks	Arkansas	WR	
Fred Biletnikoff Award	Kayshon Boutte	LSU	WR	
Fred Biletnikoff Award	Jaden Walley	Mississippi State	WR	
Fred Biletnikoff Award	Jalen Wydermyer	Texas A&M	TE	
John Mackey Award	Jahleel Billingsley	Alabama	TE	
John Mackey Award	Hudson Henry	Arkansas	TE	
John Mackey Award	John Samuel Shenker	Auburn	TE	
John Mackey Award	Keon Zipperer	Florida	TE	
John Mackey Award	Arik Gilbert	Georgia	TE	
John Mackey Award	Darnell Washington	Georgia	TE	
John Mackey Award	Nick Muse	South Carolina	TE	
John Mackey Award	Jalen Wydermyer	Texas A&M	TE	
Rimington Trophy	Ricky Stromberg	Arkansas	OL	
Rimington Trophy	Nick Brahms	Auburn	OL	
Rimington Trophy	Warren Ericson	Georgia	OL	
Rimington Trophy	Liam Shanahan	LSU	OL	
Rimington Trophy	Michael Maietti	Missouri	OL	
Butkus Award	Christopher Allen	Alabama	LB	
Butkus Award	Christian Harris	Alabama	LB	
Butkus Award	Will Anderson Jr.	Alabama	LB	
Butkus Award	Bumper Pool	Arkansas	LB	
Butkus Award	Ventrell Miller	Florida	LB	
Butkus Award	Adam Anderson	Georgia	LB	
Butkus Award	Nakobe Dean	Georgia	LB	
Butkus Award	Quay Walker	Georgia	LB	
Butkus Award	Damone Clark	LSU	LB	
Butkus Award	Lakia Henry	Ole Miss	LB	
Butkus Award	Sam Williams	Ole Miss	LB	
Butkus Award	Blaze Alldredge	Missouri	LB	
Butkus Award	Jordan Strachan	South Carolina	LB	
Butkus Award	Aaron Hansford	Texas A&M	LB	
Butkus Award	Anfernee Orji	Vanderbilt	LB	
Bronko Nagurski Trophy	Christian Harris	Alabama	LB	
Bronko Nagurski Trophy	D. J. Dale	Alabama	DL	
Bronko Nagurski Trophy	Josh Jobe	Alabama	CB	
Bronko Nagurski Trophy	Malachi Moore	Alabama	DB	
Bronko Nagurski Trophy	Phidarian Mathis	Alabama	DL	
Bronko Nagurski Trophy	Will Anderson Jr.	Alabama	LB	
Bronko Nagurski Trophy	Jalen Catalon	Arkansas	DB	
Bronko Nagurski Trophy	Grant Morgan	Arkansas	LB	
Bronko Nagurski Trophy	Zakoby McClain	Auburn	LB	
Bronko Nagurski Trophy	Smoke Monday	Auburn	DB	
Bronko Nagurski Trophy	Kaiir Elam	Florida	CB	
Bronko Nagurski Trophy	Jordan Davis	Georgia	DT	
Bronko Nagurski Trophy	Nakobe Dean	Georgia	LB	
Bronko Nagurski Trophy	Tykee Smith	Georgia	DB	
Bronko Nagurski Trophy	Derek Stingley Jr.	LSU	CB	
Bronko Nagurski Trophy	Eli Ricks	LSU	CB	
Bronko Nagurski Trophy	Blaze Alldredge	Missouri	LB	
Bronko Nagurski Trophy	Trajan Jeffcoat	Missouri	DE	
Bronko Nagurski Trophy	Kingsley Enagbare	South Carolina	DE	
Bronko Nagurski Trophy	DeMarvin Leal	Texas A&M	DE	
Outland Trophy	Phidarian Mathis	Alabama	DT	
Outland Trophy	Evan Neal	Alabama	OT	
Outland Trophy	Nick Brahms	Auburn	C	
Outland Trophy	Jamaree Salyer	Georgia	OT	
Outland Trophy	Jordan Davis	Georgia	DT	
Outland Trophy	Justin Shaffer	Georgia	OL	
Outland Trophy	Darian Kinnard	Kentucky	OT	
Outland Trophy	Ed Ingram	LSU	OL	
Outland Trophy	Nick Broeker	Ole Miss	T	
Outland Trophy	Kenyon Green	Texas A&M	OT	
Outland Trophy	McKinnley Jackson	Texas A&M	DT	
Lou Groza Award	Will Reichard	Alabama	PK	
Lou Groza Award	Anders Carlson	Auburn	PK	
Lou Groza Award	Jace Christmann	Florida	PK	
Lou Groza Award	Jack Podlesny	Georgia	PK	
Lou Groza Award	Matt Ruffolo	Kentucky	PK	
Lou Groza Award	Cade York	LSU	PK	
Lou Groza Award	Harrison Mevis	Missouri	PK	
Lou Groza Award	Chase McGrath	Tennessee	PK	
Paul Hornung Award	Tank Bigsby	Auburn	RB	
Paul Hornung Award	Wan'Dale Robinson	Kentucky	WR	
Paul Hornung Award	Derek Stingley Jr.	LSU	CB	
Paul Hornung Award	Tyler Badie	Missouri	RB	
Paul Hornung Award	Jerrion Ealy	Ole Miss	RB	
Paul Hornung Award	Velus Jones Jr.	Tennessee	WR	
Paul Hornung Award	Ainias Smith	Texas A&M	WR	
Wuerffel Trophy	Chris Owens	Alabama	OL	
Wuerffel Trophy	Jordan Silver	Arkansas	LS	
Wuerffel Trophy	Nick Brahms	Auburn	OL	
Wuerffel Trophy	Zachary Carter	Florida	DL	
Wuerffel Trophy	Nakobe Dean	Georgia	LB	
Wuerffel Trophy	Kenneth Horsey	Kentucky	OL	
Wuerffel Trophy	Damone Clark	LSU	LB	
Wuerffel Trophy	Tyler Badie	Missouri	RB	
Wuerffel Trophy	Mac Brown	Ole Miss	P	
Wuerffel Trophy	Spencer Eason-Riddle	South Carolina	LB	
Wuerffel Trophy	Matthew Butler	Tennessee	DL	
Wuerffel Trophy	Keldrick Carper	Texas A&M	DB	
Wuerffel Trophy	Elijah McAllister	Vanderbilt	LB	
Walter Camp Award	John Metchie III	Alabama	WR	
Walter Camp Award	Will Anderson Jr.	Alabama	LB	
Walter Camp Award	Treylon Burks	Arkansas	WR	
Walter Camp Award	Tank Bigsby	Auburn	RB	
Walter Camp Award	JT Daniels	Georgia	QB	
Walter Camp Award	Matt Corral	Ole Miss	QB	
Walter Camp Award	DeMarvin Leal	Texas A&M	DL	
Rotary Lombardi Award	Christian Harris	Alabama	LB	
Rotary Lombardi Award	Emil Ekiyor Jr.	Alabama	OL	
Rotary Lombardi Award	Evan Neal	Alabama	OL	
Rotary Lombardi Award	Henry To'oTo'o	Alabama	LB	
Rotary Lombardi Award	Phidarian Mathis	Alabama	DL	
Rotary Lombardi Award	Will Anderson Jr.	Alabama	LB	
Rotary Lombardi Award	Jamaree Salyer	Georgia	OL	
Rotary Lombardi Award	Justin Shaffer	Georgia	OL	
Rotary Lombardi Award	Darian Kinnard	Kentucky	OT	
Rotary Lombardi Award	Mike Jones Jr.	LSU	DL	
Rotary Lombardi Award	O'Cyrus Torrence	LSU	OL	
Rotary Lombardi Award	Kenyon Green	Texas A&M	RB	
Rotary Lombardi Award	DeMarvin Leal	Texas A&M	DL	
Rotary Lombardi Award	Jalen Wydermyer	Texas A&M	TE	
Manning Award	Bo Nix	Auburn	QB	
Manning Award	JT Daniels	Georgia	QB	
Manning Award	Matt Corral	Ole Miss	QB	
Earl Campbell Tyler Rose Award	Trelon Smith	Arkansas	RB	
Earl Campbell Tyler Rose Award	Keke Chism	Missouri	WR	
Earl Campbell Tyler Rose Award	Isaiah Spiller	Texas A&M	RB	
Earl Campbell Tyler Rose Award	Ken Seals	Vanderbilt	QB	
Ray Guy Award	Jake Camarda	Georgia	P	
Ray Guy Award	Tucker Day	Mississippi State	P	
Ray Guy Award	Grant McKinniss	Missouri	P	
Ray Guy Award	Mac Brown	Ole Miss	P	
Ray Guy Award	Nik Constantinou	Texas A&M	P	
Polynesian College Football Player of the Year Award	Henry To'oTo'o	Alabama	LB	
Polynesian College Football Player of the Year Award	Cameron Latu	Alabama	TE	
Polynesian College Football Player of the Year Award	Feleti Afemui	Vanderbilt	LB	
Johnny Unitas Golden Arm Award	Bo Nix	Auburn	QB	
Johnny Unitas Golden Arm Award	Emory Jones	Florida	QB	
Johnny Unitas Golden Arm Award	JT Daniels	Georgia	QB	
Johnny Unitas Golden Arm Award	Connor Bazelak	Missouri	QB	
Johnny Unitas Golden Arm Award	Matt Corral	Ole Miss	QB	
Johnny Unitas Golden Arm Award	Hendon Hooker	Tennessee	QB	

==== Preseason All-SEC media ====
First Team offense
Position	Player	Class	Team
QB	Matt Corral	JR	Ole Miss
RB	Tank Bigsby	SO	Auburn
RB	Isaiah Spiller	JR	Texas A&M
WR	John Metchie III	JR	Alabama
WR	Treylon Burks	JR	Arkansas
TE	Jalen Wydermyer	JR	Texas A&M
OL	Evan Neal	JR	Alabama
OL	Darian Kinnard	SR	Kentucky
OL	Kenyon Green	JR	Texas A&M
OL	Cade Mays	SR	Tennessee
C	Nick Brahms	SR	Auburn

First Team defense
Position	Player	Class	Team
DL	Jordan Davis	JR	Georgia
DL	Phidarian Mathis	RS SR	Alabama
DL	Kingsley Enagbare	SR	South Carolina
DL	Zachary Carter	RS SR	Florida
DL	DeMarvin Leal	JR	Texas A&M
LB	Henry To'oTo'o	JR	Alabama
LB	Christian Harris	JR	Alabama
DB	Derek Stingley Jr.	JR	LSU
DB	Josh Jobe	SR	Alabama
DB	Malachi Moore	SO	Alabama
DB	Kaiir Elam	JR	Florida

First Team Special Teams
Position	Player	Class	Team
P	Jake Camarda	SR	Georgia
K	Cade York	JR	LSU
RS	Jerrion Ealy	SO	Ole Miss
AP	Jerrion Ealy	SO	Ole Miss

Second Team offense
Position	Player	Class	Team
QB	JT Daniels	JR	Georgia
RB	Kevin Harris	JR	South Carolina
RB	Zamir White	JR	Georgia
WR	Kayshon Boutte	SO	LSU
WR	George Pickens	JR	Georgia
TE	Jahleel Billingsley	JR	Alabama
OL	Jamaree Salyer	SR	Georgia
OL	Emil Ekiyor Jr.	RS JR	Alabama
OL	Ed Ingram	SR	LSU
OL	Austin Deculus	RS SO	LSU
C	Ricky Stromberg	JR	Arkansas

Second Team defense
Position	Player	Class	Team
DL	Josh Paschal	SR	Kentucky
DL	LaBryan Ray	SR	Alabama
DL	Ali Gaye	SR	LSU
DL	Trajan Jeffcoat	RS JR	Missouri
LB	Grant Morgan	RS SR	Arkansas
LB	Ventrell Miller	RS SR	Florida
LB	Zakoby McClain	SR	Auburn
DB	Smoke Monday	SR	Auburn
DB	Jordan Battle	JR	Alabama
DB	Jalen Catalon	RS SO	Arkansas
DB	Eli Ricks	SO	LSU

Second Team Special Teams
Position	Player	Class	Team
K	Will Reichard	JR	Alabama
P	Paxton Brooks	SR	Tennessee
RS	Ainias Smith	SO	Texas A&M
AP	Tank Bigsby	JR	Auburn

Third Team offense
Position	Player	Class	Team
QB	Bo Nix	JR	Auburn
RB	Brian Robinson Jr.	GS	Alabama
RB	Chris Rodriguez Jr.	JR	Kentucky
WR	Ainias Smith	SO	Texas A&M
WR	Jacob Copeland	RS JR	Florida
TE	Nick Muse	GS	South Carolina
OL	Charles Cross	RS SO	Mississippi State
OL	Nick Broeker	JR	Ole Miss
OL	Myron Cunningham	RS SR	Arkansas
OL	Luke Fortner	GS	Kentucky
C	Michael Maietti	GS	Missouri
C	Ben Brown	RS SR	Ole Miss

Third Team defense
Position	Player	Class	Team
DL	D. J. Dale	JR	Alabama
DL	Jayden Peevy	SR	Texas A&M
DL	Travon Walker	JR	Georgia
DL	Derick Hall	JR	Auburn
LB	Owen Pappoe	JR	Auburn
LB	Nakobe Dean	JR	Georgia
LB	Christopher Allen	RS SR	Alabama
DB	Roger McCreary	SR	Auburn
DB	Lewis Cine	JR	Georgia
DB	Alontae Taylor	SR	Tennessee
DB	Yusuf Corker	SR	Kentucky

Third Team Special Teams
Position	Player	Class	Team
P	Mac Brown	SR	Ole Miss
K	Anders Carlson	SR	Auburn
RS	Kearis Jackson	JR	Georgia
AP	Ainias Smith	SO	Texas A&M

==== Preseason All-SEC coaches ====
First Team offense
Position	Player	Class	Team
QB	Matt Corral	JR	Ole Miss
RB	Tank Bigsby	SO	Auburn
RB	Isaiah Spiller	JR	Texas A&M
WR	John Metchie III	JR	Alabama
WR	Treylon Burks	JR	Arkansas
TE	Jalen Wydermyer	JR	Texas A&M
OL	Evan Neal	JR	Alabama
OL	Darian Kinnard	SR	Kentucky
OL	Kenyon Green	JR	Texas A&M
OL	Cade Mays	SR	Tennessee
C	Ricky Stromberg	JR	Arkansas

First Team defense
Position	Player	Class	Team
DL	Jordan Davis	JR	Georgia
DL	Phidarian Mathis	RS SR	Alabama
DL	Kingsley Enagbare	SR	South Carolina
DL	Zachary Carter	RS SR	Florida
LB	Christian Harris	JR	Alabama
LB	Grant Morgan	RS SR	Arkansas
LB	Will Anderson Jr.	SO	Alabama
DB	Derek Stingley Jr.	JR	LSU
DB	Josh Jobe	SR	Alabama
DB	Malachi Moore	SO	Alabama
DB	Kaiir Elam	JR	Florida

First Team Special Teams
Position	Player	Class	Team
P	Jake Camarda	SR	Georgia
K	Cade York	JR	LSU
RS	Jerrion Ealy	SO	Ole Miss

Second Team offense
Position	Player	Class	Team
QB	JT Daniels	JR	Georgia
RB	Kevin Harris	JR	South Carolina
RB	Zamir White	JR	Georgia
WR	Kayshon Boutte	SO	LSU
WR	George Pickens	JR	Georgia
TE	Jahleel Billingsley	JR	Alabama
OL	Jamaree Salyer	SR	Georgia
OL	Emil Ekiyor Jr.	RS JR	Alabama
OL	Ed Ingram	SR	LSU
OL	Charles Cross	RS SO	Mississippi State
C	Nick Brahms	SR	Auburn
AP	Tank Bigsby	SO	Auburn

Second Team defense
Position	Player	Class	Team
DL	DeMarvin Leal	JR	Texas A&M
DL	Josh Paschal	SR	Kentucky
DL	Ali Gaye	SR	LSU
DL	Trajan Jeffcoat	RS JR	Missouri
LB	Henry To'oTo'o	JR	Alabama
LB	Ventrell Miller	RS SR	Florida
LB	Zakoby McClain	SR	Auburn
DB	Smoke Monday	SR	Auburn
DB	Jordan Battle	JR	Alabama
DB	Jalen Catalon	RS SO	Arkansas
DB	Eli Ricks	SO	LSU

Second Team Special Teams
Position	Player	Class	Team
K	Anders Carlson	SR	Auburn
P	Paxton Brooks	SR	Tennessee
P	Mac Brown	SR	Ole Miss
RS	Ainias Smith	SO	Texas A&M

Third Team offense
Position	Player	Class	Team
QB	Bo Nix	JR	Auburn
QB	Connor Bazelak	RS SO	Missouri
RB	Brian Robinson Jr.	GS	Alabama
RB	Chris Rodriguez Jr.	JR	Kentucky
RB	Jerrion Ealy	SO	Ole Miss
WR	Ainias Smith	SO	Texas A&M
WR	Jacob Copeland	RS JR	Florida
WR	Jermaine Burton	SO	Georgia
TE	Nick Muse	GS	South Carolina
OL	Austin Deculus	RS SO	LSU
OL	Nick Broeker	JR	Ole Miss
OL	Myron Cunningham	RS SR	Arkansas
OL	Luke Fortner	GS	Kentucky
OL	Brodarius Hamm	SR	Auburn
OL	Ty Clary	RS SR	Arkansas
C	Michael Maietti	GS	Missouri
AP	Ainias Smith	SO	Texas A&M

Third Team defense
Position	Player	Class	Team
DL	LaBryan Ray	SR	Alabama
DL	Jayden Peevy	SR	Texas A&M
DL	Travon Walker	JR	Georgia
DL	Zacch Pickens	JR	South Carolina
LB	Owen Pappoe	JR	Auburn
LB	Nakobe Dean	JR	Georgia
LB	Christopher Allen	RS SR	Alabama
DB	Roger McCreary	SR	Auburn
DB	Lewis Cine	JR	Georgia
DB	Leon O'Neal Jr.	SR	Texas A&M
DB	Alontae Taylor	SR	Tennessee
DB	Yusuf Corker	SR	Kentucky

Third Team Special Teams
Position	Player	Class	Team
K	Will Reichard	JR	Alabama
P	Grant McKinniss	GS	Missouri
RS	Kearis Jackson	JR	Georgia

== Head coaches ==
Three coaches were fired after the 2020 season.

Auburn Head Coach Gus Malzahn was fired after eight seasons at the school on December 13, 2020. Boise State Bryan Harsin was named head coach on December 22, 2020.

On November 15, 2020, South Carolina Head Coach Will Muschamp was fired. Offensive coordinator Mike Bobo replaced him as interim head coach with three games left in the season. Oklahoma Assistant Head Coach Shane Beamer replaced him on December 6, 2020.

On January 18, 2021, Tennessee Coach Jeremy Pruitt was fired and replaced by former UCF Head Coach Josh Heupel on January 27, 2021.

School	Coach	Year
Alabama	Nick Saban	15th
Arkansas	Sam Pittman	2nd
Auburn	Bryan Harsin	1st
Florida	Dan Mullen	4th
Georgia	Kirby Smart	6th
Kentucky	Mark Stoops	9th
LSU	Ed Orgeron	(5th full season; 6th overall season)
Mississippi State	Mike Leach	2nd
Missouri	Eliah Drinkwitz	2nd
Ole Miss	Lane Kiffin	2nd
South Carolina	Shane Beamer	1st
Tennessee	Josh Heupel	1st
Texas A&M	Jimbo Fisher	4th
Vanderbilt	Clark Lea	1st

== Rankings ==
		Pre	Wk 1	Wk 2	Wk 3	Wk 4	Wk 5	Wk 6	Wk 7	Wk 8	Wk 9	Wk 10	Wk 11	Wk 12	Wk 13	Wk 14	Final
Alabama	AP	1 (47)	1 (59)	1 (60)	1 (59)	1 (58)	1 (53)	5	4	3	3	3	2	3	4	1 (50)	2
Alabama	C	1 (63)	1 (64)	1 (64)	1 (64)	1 (64)	1 (63)	5	4	3	3	2	2	2	2	1 (54)	2
Alabama	CFP	Not released									2	2	2	3	3	1	
Arkansas	AP			20	16	8	13	17	RV	RV	RV	RV	21	25	23	22	21
Arkansas	C	RV	RV	24	18	11	16	19	RV	RV	RV	RV	22	RV	25	24	20
Arkansas	CFP	Not released										25	21	25	22	21	
Auburn	AP	RV	25	22	23	22	18	RV	19	18	12	16	RV				
Auburn	C	RV	RV	20	23	22	19	RV	22	21	14	20	RV				
Auburn	CFP	Not released									13	17					
Florida	AP	13	13	11	11	10	20	20	RV	RV							
Florida	C	11	9	9	11	9	18	17	RV	RV							
Florida	CFP	Not released															
Georgia	AP	5 (3)	2 (4)	2 (3)	2 (3)	2 (4)	2 (9)	1 (62)	1 (63)	1 (63)	1 (63)	1 (63)	1 (63)	1 (62)	1 (62)	3	1 (61)
Georgia	C	5	2 (1)	2 (1)	2 (1)	2 (1)	2 (2)	1 (64)	1 (65)	1 (64)	1 (64)	1 (64)	1 (64)	1 (62)	1 (62)	3	1 (62)
Georgia	CFP	Not released									1	1	1	1	1	3	
Kentucky	AP	RV	RV	RV	RV	RV	16	11	15	12	18	RV	RV	RV	25	25	18
Kentucky	C	RV	RV	RV	RV	23	14	11	14	12	17	RV	RV	25	22	20	15
Kentucky	CFP	Not released									18				23	22	
LSU	AP	16	RV	RV	RV	RV			RV								
LSU	C	13	RV	RV	RV	RV			RV								
LSU	CFP	Not released															
Mississippi State	AP						RV	RV			RV	RV	RV	RV	RV	RV	
Mississippi State	C	RV		RV			RV	RV			RV		RV	RV	RV	RV	
Mississippi State	CFP	Not released									17		25				
Missouri	AP																
Missouri	C	RV															
Missouri	CFP	Not released															
Ole Miss	AP	RV	20	17	13	12	17	13	12	10	15	12	10	8	8	8	11
Ole Miss	C	25	20	16	13	12	17	14	12	9	15	12	10	8	8	8	11
Ole Miss	CFP	Not released									16	15	12	9	8	8	
South Carolina	AP																
South Carolina	C																
South Carolina	CFP	Not released															
Tennessee	AP																
Tennessee	C				RV			RV				RV					
Tennessee	CFP	Not released															
Texas A&M	AP	6	5	7	7	15	RV	21	17	14	13	11	16	14	24	23	RV
Texas A&M	C	6	5	5	5	13	RV	18	17	14	12	11	16	14	23	23	25
Texas A&M	CFP	Not released									14	11	16	15	25	25	
Vanderbilt	AP																
Vanderbilt	C																
Vanderbilt	CFP	Not released															

Legend
	Improvement in ranking
	Drop in ranking
	Not ranked previous week
	No change in ranking from previous week
RV	Received votes but were not ranked in Top 25 of poll
т	Tied with team above or below also with this symbol

== Regular season ==
The schedule was released on January 27, 2021. The season began on September 2, 2021, and ended with the SEC Championship Game on December 4, 2021.

=== Week One ===
Date	Time	Visiting team	Home team	Site	TV	Result	Attendance	Ref.
September 2	7:00 p.m.	Bowling Green	Tennessee	Neyland Stadium • Knoxville, TN	SECN	W 6–38	84,314	
September 4	11:00 a.m.	Louisiana–Monroe	Kentucky	Kroger Field • Lexington, KY	SECN	W 10–45	47,693	
September 4	1:00 p.m.	Rice	Arkansas	Donald W. Reynolds Razorback Stadium • Fayetteville, AR	ESPN+	W 17–38	64,065	
September 4	2:30 p.m.	No. 1 Alabama	No. 14 Miami	Mercedes-Benz Stadium • Atlanta, GA (SEC Nation) (Chick-fil-A Kickoff Game)	ABC	W 44–13	71,829	
September 4	3:00 p.m.	Central Michigan	Missouri	Faurot Field • Columbia, MO	SECN	W 24–34	46,237	
September 4	3:00 p.m.	Louisiana Tech	Mississippi State	Davis Wade Stadium • Starkville, MS	ESPNU	W 34–35	44,669	
September 4	6:00 p.m.	Akron	Auburn	Jordan-Hare Stadium • Auburn, AL	ESPN+	W 10–60	83,821	
September 4	6:00 p.m.	Eastern Illinois	South Carolina	Williams-Brice Stadium • Columbia, SC	ESPN+	W 0–46	64,868	
September 4	6:30 p.m.	No. 5 Georgia	No. 3 Clemson	Bank of America Stadium • Charlotte, NC College GameDay (Duke's Mayo Classic/rivalry)	ABC	W 10–3	74,187	
September 4	6:30 p.m.	Florida Atlantic	No. 13 Florida	Ben Hill Griffin Stadium • Gainesville, FL	SECN	W 14–35	86,840	
September 4	7:00 p.m.	East Tennessee State	Vanderbilt	Vanderbilt Stadium • Nashville, TN	ESPN+	L 23–3	22,029	
September 4	7:00 p.m.	Kent State	No. 6 Texas A&M	Kyle Field • College Station, TX	ESPNU	W 10–41	97,339	
September 4	7:30 p.m.	No. 16 LSU	UCLA	Rose Bowl • Pasadena, CA	FOX	L 27–38	68,123	
September 6	7:00 p.m.	Louisville	Ole Miss	Mercedes Benz Stadium • Atlanta, GA (Chick-fil-A Kickoff Classic)	ESPN	W 24–43	30,709	
^{#}Rankings from AP Poll released prior to game. All times are in Central Time.

=== Week Two ===
Date	Time	Visiting team	Home team	Site	TV	Result	Attendance	Ref.
September 11	11:00 a.m.	Alabama State	No. 25 Auburn	Jordan–Hare Stadium • Auburn, AL	SEC Network	W 0–62	82,745	
September 11	11:00 a.m.	South Carolina	East Carolina	Dowdy–Ficklen Stadium • Greenville, NC	ESPN2	W 20–17	40,816	
September 11	11:00 a.m.	Pittsburgh	Tennessee	Neyland Stadium • Knoxville, TN	ESPN	L 41–34	82,203	
September 11	12:00 p.m.	No. 13 Florida	South Florida	Raymond James Stadium • Tampa, FL	ABC	W 42–20	66,646	
September 11	2:30 p.m.	UAB	No. 2 Georgia	Sanford Stadium • Athens, GA	ESPN2	W 7–56	92,746	
September 11	2:30 p.m.	No. 5 Texas A&M	Colorado	Empower Field at Mile High • Denver, CO	FOX	W 10–7	61,203	
September 11	3:00 p.m.	Mercer	No. 1 Alabama	Bryant Denny Stadium • Tuscaloosa, AL	SEC Network	W 14–48	95,396	
September 11	6:00 p.m.	No. 15 Texas	Arkansas	Razorback Stadium • Fayetteville, AR (SEC Nation) (rivalry)	ESPN	W 21–40	74,531	
September 11	6:00 p.m.	NC State	Mississippi State	Davis Wade Stadium • Starkville, MS	ESPN2	W 10–24	45,834	
September 11	6:30 p.m.	No. 17 (FCS) Austin Peay	No. 20 Ole Miss	Vaught–Hemingway Stadium • Oxford, MS	ESPN+	W 17–54	47,848	
September 11	6:30 p.m.	Missouri	Kentucky	Kroger Field • Lexington, KY	SEC Network	UK 28–35	58,437	
September 11	7:00 p.m.	McNeese State	LSU	Tiger Stadium • Baton Rouge, LA	ESPN+	W 7–34	94,220	
September 11	9:00 p.m.	Vanderbilt	Colorado State	Canvas Stadium • Fort Collins, CO	CBSSN	W 24–21	27,233	
^{#}Rankings from AP Poll released prior to game. All times are in Central Time.

=== Week Three ===
Date	Time	Visiting team	Home team	Site	TV	Result	Attendance	Ref.
September 18	11:00 a.m.	Tennessee Tech	Tennessee	Neyland Stadium • Knoxville, TN	ESPN+	W 0–56	80,053	
September 18	11:00 a.m.	New Mexico	No. 7 Texas A&M	Kyle Field • College Station, TX	SEC Network	W 0-34	84,748	
September 18	11:00 a.m.	Chattanooga	Kentucky	Kroger Field • Lexington, KY	ESPN+	W 23–28	55,214	
September 18	11:00 a.m.	Southeast Missouri State	Missouri	Faurot Field • Columbia, MO	ESPN+	W 28–59	46,598	
September 18	2:30 p.m.	No. 1 Alabama	No. 11 Florida	Ben Hill Griffin Stadium • Gainesville, FL (SEC Nation) (rivalry)	CBS	ALA 31–29	90,887	
September 18	3:00 p.m.	Georgia Southern	No. 20 Arkansas	Razorback Stadium • Fayetteville, AR	SEC Network	W 10–45	66,311	
September 18	3:00 p.m.	Mississippi State	Memphis	Liberty Bowl Memorial Stadium • Memphis, TN	ESPN2	L 29–31	43,461	
September 18	6:00 p.m.	South Carolina	No. 2 Georgia	Sanford Stadium • Athens, GA	ESPN	UGA 13–40	92,746	
September 18	6:30 p.m.	No. 22 Auburn	No. 10 Penn State	Beaver Stadium • State College, PA College GameDay	ABC	L 20–28	109,958	
September 18	6:30 p.m.	Central Michigan	LSU	Tiger Stadium • Baton Rouge, LA	SEC Network	W 21–49	92,547	
September 18	7:00 p.m.	Tulane	No. 17 Ole Miss	Vaught–Hemingway Stadium • Oxford, MS (rivalry)	ESPN2	W 21–61	54,198	
September 18	7:00 p.m.	Stanford	Vanderbilt	Vanderbilt Stadium • Nashville, TN	ESPNU	L 41–23	21,124	
^{#}Rankings from AP Poll released prior to game. All times are in Central Time.

=== Week Four ===
Date	Time	Visiting team	Home team	Site	TV	Result	Attendance	Ref.
September 25	11:00 a.m.	No. 2 Georgia	Vanderbilt	Vanderbilt Stadium • Nashville, TN	SECN	UGA 62–0	32,178	
September 25	11:00 a.m.	LSU	Mississippi State	Davis Wade Stadium • Starkville, MS (rivalry)	ESPN	LSU 28–25	50,298	
September 25	11:00 a.m.	Missouri	Boston College	Alumni Stadium • Chestnut Hill, MA	ESPN2	L 34–41 ^{OT}	44,500	
September 25	2:30 p.m.	No. 7 Texas A&M	No. 16 Arkansas	AT&T Stadium • Arlington, TX (Southwest Classic)	CBS	ARK 10–20	57,992	
September 25	3:00 p.m.	Georgia State	No. 23 Auburn	Jordan-Hare Stadium • Auburn, AL	SECN	W 24–34	86,650	
September 25	6:00 p.m.	Tennessee	No. 11 Florida	Ben Hill Griffin Stadium • Gainesville, FL (rivalry)	ESPN	FLA 14–38	88,478	
September 25	6:00 p.m.	Kentucky	South Carolina	Williams-Brice Stadium • Columbia, SC (SEC Nation)	ESPN2	UK 16–10	77,559	
September 25	6:30 p.m.	Southern Miss	No. 1 Alabama	Bryant Denny Stadium • Tuscaloosa, AL	SECN	W 14–63	100,077	
^{#}Rankings from AP Poll released prior to game. All times are in Central Time.

=== Week Five ===
Date	Time	Visiting team	Home team	Site	TV	Result	Attendance	Ref.
October 2	11:00 a.m.	Tennessee	Missouri	Faurot Field • Columbia, MO	SECN	TENN 62–24	45,655	
October 2	11:00 a.m.	No. 8 Arkansas	No. 2 Georgia	Sanford Stadium • Athens, GA College GameDay	ESPN	UGA 0-37	92,746	
October 2	2:30 p.m.	No. 12 Ole Miss	No. 1 Alabama	Bryant Denny Stadium • Tuscaloosa, AL (SEC Nation)	CBS	ALA 21–42	100,077	
October 2	2:30 p.m.	Troy	South Carolina	Williams-Brice Stadium • Columbia, SC	SECN	W 14–23	60,686	
October 2	5:00 p.m.	No. 10 Florida	Kentucky	Kroger Field • Lexington, KY	ESPN	UK 13–20	61,632	
October 2	6:00 p.m.	Mississippi State	No. 15 Texas A&M	Kyle Field • College Station, TX	SECN	MISS ST 26–22	87,973	
October 2	6:30 p.m.	UConn	Vanderbilt	Vanderbilt Stadium • Nashville, TN	ESPNU	W 28–30	21,218	
October 2	8:00 p.m.	No. 22 Auburn	LSU	Tiger Stadium • Baton Rouge, LA (Tiger Bowl)	ESPN	AUB 24–19	97,717	
^{#}Rankings from AP Poll released prior to game. All times are in Central Time.

=== Week Six ===
Date	Time	Visiting team	Home team	Site	TV	Result	Attendance	Ref.
October 9	11:00 a.m.	Vanderbilt	No. 20 Florida	Ben Hill Griffin Stadium • Gainesville, FL	SECN	FLA 0-42	86,258	
October 9	11:00 a.m.	South Carolina	Tennessee	Neyland Stadium • Knoxville, TN	ESPN2	TENN 20–45	89,437	
October 9	11:00 a.m.	No. 13 Arkansas	No. 17 Ole Miss	Vaught-Hemingway Stadium • Oxford, MS (rivalry)	ESPN	MISS 51–52	60,256	
October 9	2:30 p.m.	No. 2 Georgia	No. 18 Auburn	Jordan–Hare Stadium • Auburn, AL (Deep South's Oldest Rivalry)	CBS	UGA 34–10	87,451	
October 9	3:00 p.m.	North Texas	Missouri	Faurot Field • Columbia, MO	SECN	W 35–48	46,985	
October 9	6:30 p.m.	LSU	No. 16 Kentucky	Kroger Field • Lexington, KY (SEC Nation)	SECN	UK 21–42	61,690	
October 9	7:00 p.m.	No. 1 Alabama	Texas A&M	Kyle Field • College Station, TX	CBS	TAMU 38–41	106,815	
^{#}Rankings from AP Poll released prior to game. All times are in Central Time.

=== Week Seven ===
Date	Time	Visiting team	Home team	Site	TV	Result	Attendance	Ref.
October 16	11:00 a.m.	Auburn	No. 17 Arkansas	Razorback Stadium • Fayetteville, AR	CBS	AUB 38–23	73,370	
October 16	11:00 a.m.	No. 20 Florida	LSU	Tiger Stadium • Baton Rouge, LA (rivalry)	ESPN	LSU 42–49	96,012	
October 16	11:00 a.m.	No. 21 Texas A&M	Missouri	Faurot Field • Columbia, MO	SECN	TAMU 35–14	48,139	
October 16	2:30 p.m.	No. 11 Kentucky	No. 1 Georgia	Sanford Stadium • Athens, GA (SEC Nation) College GameDay	CBS	UGA 13–30	92,746	
October 16	3:00 p.m.	Vanderbilt	South Carolina	Williams-Brice Stadium • Columbia, SC	SECN	SCAR 20–21	64,695	
October 16	6:00 p.m.	No. 5 Alabama	Mississippi State	Davis Wade Stadium • Starkville, MS (rivalry)	ESPN	ALA 49–9	53,796	
October 16	6:30 p.m.	No. 13 Ole Miss	Tennessee	Neyland Stadium • Knoxville, TN	SECN	MISS 31–26	102,455	
^{#}Rankings from AP Poll released prior to game. All times are in Central Time.

=== Week Eight ===
Date	Time	Visiting team	Home team	Site	TV	Result	Attendance	Ref.
October 23	11:00 a.m.	Arkansas–Pine Bluff	Arkansas	War Memorial Stadium • Little Rock, AR	SECN	W 3–45	42,576	
October 23	2:30 p.m.	LSU	No. 12 Ole Miss	Vaught-Hemingway Stadium • Oxford, MS (SEC Nation) (Magnolia Bowl)	CBS	MISS 17–31	64,523	
October 23	3:00 p.m.	Mississippi State	Vanderbilt	Vanderbilt Stadium • Nashville, TN	SECN	MISS ST 44–6	22,036	
October 23	6:00 p.m.	Tennessee	No. 4 Alabama	Bryant–Denny Stadium • Tuscaloosa, AL (Third Saturday in October)	ESPN	ALA 24–52	100,077	
October 23	6:30 p.m.	South Carolina	No. 17 Texas A&M	Kyle Field • College Station, TX	SECN	TAMU 14–44	103,889	
^{#}Rankings from AP Poll released prior to game. All times are in Central Time.

=== Week Nine ===
Date	Time	Visiting team	Home team	Site	TV	Result	Attendance	Ref.
October 30	2:00 p.m.	Missouri	Vanderbilt	Vanderbilt Stadium • Nashville, TN	SECN	MIZZOU 37–28	19,821	
October 30	2:30 p.m.	No. 1 Georgia	Florida	TIAA Bank Field • Jacksonville, FL (SEC Nation) (rivalry)	CBS	UGA 34–7	76,141	
October 30	6:00 p.m.	No. 12 Kentucky	Mississippi State	Davis Wade Stadium • Starkville, MS	SECN	MISS ST 17–31	49,487	
October 30	6:00 p.m.	No. 10 Ole Miss	No. 18 Auburn	Jordan-Hare Stadium • Auburn, AL (rivalry)	ESPN	AUB 20–31	87,451	
^{#}Rankings from AP Poll released prior to game. All times are in Central Time.

=== Week Ten ===
Date	Time	Visiting team	Home team	Site	TV	Result	Attendance	Ref.
November 6	11:00 a.m.	Missouri	No. 1 Georgia	Sanford Stadium • Athens, GA	ESPN	UGA 6–43	92,746	
November 6	11:00 a.m.	Liberty	No. 16 Ole Miss	Vaught-Hemingway Stadium • Oxford, MS	SECN	W 14–27	53,235	
November 6	2:30 p.m.	No. 13 Auburn	No. 14 Texas A&M	Kyle Field • College Station, TX (SEC Nation)	CBS	TAMU 3–20	109,835	
November 6	3:00 p.m.	No. 17 Mississippi State	Arkansas	Razorback Stadium • Fayetteville, AR	SECN	ARK 28–31	68,818	
November 6	6:00 p.m.	LSU	No. 2 Alabama	Bryant-Denny Stadium • Tuscaloosa, AL (rivalry)	ESPN	ALA 14–20	100,077	
November 6	6:00 p.m.	Tennessee	No. 18 Kentucky	Kroger Field • Lexington, KY (rivalry)	ESPN2	TENN 45–42	61,690	
November 6	6:30 p.m.	Florida	South Carolina	Williams-Brice Stadium • Columbia, SC	SECN	SCAR 17–40	70,131	
^{#}Rankings from College Football Playoff. All times are in Central Time.

=== Week Eleven ===
Date	Time	Visiting team	Home team	Site	TV	Result	Attendance	Ref.
November 13	11:00 a.m.	Mississippi State	No. 17 Auburn	Jordan-Hare Stadium • Auburn, AL	ESPN	MISS ST 43–34	87,451	
November 13	11:00 a.m.	New Mexico State	No. 2 Alabama	Bryant-Denny Stadium • Tuscaloosa, AL	SECN	W 3–59	97,011	
November 13	11:00 a.m.	Samford	Florida	Ben Hill Griffin Stadium • Gainesville, FL	SECN+/ESPN+	W 52–70	70,098	
November 13	2:30 p.m.	No. 1 Georgia	Tennessee	Neyland Stadium • Knoxville, TN (SEC Nation) (rivalry)	CBS	UGA 41–17	100,074	
November 13	3:00 p.m.	South Carolina	Missouri	Faurot Field • Columbia, MO	SECN	MIZZOU 28–31	44,092	
November 13	6:00 p.m.	No. 11 Texas A&M	No. 15 Ole Miss	Vaught-Hemingway Stadium • Oxford, MS College GameDay	ESPN	MISS 19–29	64,425	
November 13	6:00 p.m.	Kentucky	Vanderbilt	Vanderbilt Stadium • Nashville, TN (rivalry)	ESPN2	UK 34–17	25,798	
November 13	6:30 p.m.	No. 25 Arkansas	LSU	Tiger Stadium • Baton Rouge, LA (rivalry)	SECN	ARK 16–13 ^{OT}	98,772	
^{#}Rankings from College Football Playoff. All times are in Central Time.

=== Week Twelve ===
Date	Time	Visiting team	Home team	Site	TV	Result	Attendance	Ref.
November 20	11:00 a.m.	New Mexico State	Kentucky	Kroger Field • Lexington, KY	SECN	W 16–56	47,749	
November 20	11:00 a.m.	Charleston Southern	No. 1 Georgia	Sanford Stadium • Athens, GA	SECN+/ESPN+	W 7–56	92,746	
November 20	11:00 a.m.	Tennessee State	No. 25 Mississippi State	Davis Wade Stadium • Starkville, MS	SECN+/ESPN+	W 10–55	46,770	
November 20	11:00 a.m.	Prairie View A&M	No. 16 Texas A&M	Kyle Field • College Station, TX	SECN+/ESPN+	W 3–52	98,251	
November 20	2:30 p.m.	No. 21 Arkansas	No. 2 Alabama	Bryant-Denny Stadium • Tuscaloosa, AL (SEC Nation)	CBS	ALA 35–42	98,323	
November 20	3:00 p.m.	Florida	Missouri	Faurot Field • Columbia, MO	SECN	MIZZOU 23–24 ^{OT}	47,818	
November 20	6:00 p.m.	Auburn	South Carolina	Williams-Brice Stadium • Columbia, SC	ESPN	SCAR 17–21	70,299	
November 20	6:30 p.m.	Vanderbilt	No. 12 Ole Miss	Vaught–Hemingway Stadium • Oxford, MS (rivalry)	SECN	MISS 17–31	-	
November 20	6:30 p.m.	South Alabama	Tennessee	Neyland Stadium • Knoxville, TN	ESPNU	W 14–60	75,203	
November 20	8:00 p.m.	Louisiana–Monroe	LSU	Tiger Stadium • Baton Rouge, LA	ESPN2	W 14–27	-	
^{#}Rankings from College Football Playoff. All times are in Central Time.

=== Week Thirteen ===
Date	Time	Visiting team	Home team	Site	TV	Result	Attendance	Ref.
November 25	6:30 p.m.	No. 9 Ole Miss	Mississippi State	Davis Wade Stadium • Starkville, MS (Egg Bowl)	ESPN	MISS 31–21	55,601	
November 26	2:30 p.m.	Missouri	No. 25 Arkansas	Razorback Stadium • Fayetteville, AR (Battle Line Rivalry)	CBS	ARK 17-34	67,320	
November 27	11:00 a.m.	Florida State	Florida	Ben Hill Griffin Stadium • Gainesville, FL (rivalry)	ESPN	W 21–24	88,491	
November 27	11:00 a.m.	No. 1 Georgia	Georgia Tech	Bobby Dodd Stadium • Atlanta, GA (Clean, Old-Fashioned Hate)	ABC	W 45–0	52,806	
November 27	2:30 p.m.	No. 3 Alabama	Auburn	Jordan–Hare Stadium • Auburn, AL (Iron Bowl / SEC Nation)	CBS	ALA 24–22 ^{4OT}	87,451	
November 27	2:45 p.m.	Vanderbilt	Tennessee	Neyland Stadium • Knoxville, TN (rivalry)	SECN	TENN 21–45	77,349	
November 27	6:00 p.m.	No. 15 Texas A&M	LSU	Tiger Stadium • Baton Rouge, LA (rivalry)	ESPN	LSU 24–27	91,595	
November 27	6:30 p.m.	Kentucky	Louisville	Cardinal Stadium • Louisville, KY (Governor's Cup)	ESPN2	W 52–21	55,018	
November 27	6:30 p.m.	No. 23 Clemson	South Carolina	Williams-Brice Stadium • Columbia, SC (rivalry)	SECN	L 30-0	79,897	
^{#}Rankings from College Football Playoff. All times are in Central Time.

== Championship Game ==
Date	Time	Visiting team	Home team	Site	TV	Result	Attendance	Ref.
December 4	3:00 p.m.	No. 1 Georgia	No. 3 Alabama	Mercedes-Benz Stadium • Atlanta, GA (SEC Nation)	CBS	ALA 24–41	78,030	
^{#}Rankings from College Football Playoff. All times are in Central Time.

== Postseason ==
=== Bowl games ===
For the 2020–2025 bowl cycle, the SEC had eight appearances annually in the following bowls: Sugar Bowl and Peach Bowl (unless they are selected for playoffs filled by a Big 12 and at-large team if champion is in the playoffs), Citrus Bowl, Duke's Mayo Bowl, Gator Bowl, Liberty Bowl, Music City Bowl, Outback Bowl and Texas Bowl. The SEC teams go to a New Year's Six bowl if a team finishes higher than the champions of Power Five conferences in the final College Football Playoff rankings. The SEC champion are also eligible for the College Football Playoff if they are among the top four teams in the final CFP ranking.

Legend
SEC win
SEC loss

Bowl game	Date	Site	Television	Time (CST)	SEC team	Opponent	Score	Attendance
Armed Forces Bowl	December 22, 2021	Amon G. Carter Stadium • Fort Worth, TX	ESPN	7:00 p.m.	Missouri	Army	L 22–24	34,888
Gasparilla Bowl	December 23, 2021	Raymond James Stadium • Tampa, FL	ESPN	6:00 p.m.	Florida	UCF	L 17–29	63,669
Birmingham Bowl	December 28, 2021	Protective Stadium • Birmingham, AL	ESPN	12:00 p.m.	Auburn	No. 20 Houston	L 13–17	47,100
Liberty Bowl	December 28, 2021	Liberty Bowl • Memphis, TN	ESPN	5:45 p.m.	Mississippi State	Texas Tech	L 7–34	48,615
Duke's Mayo Bowl	December 30, 2021	Bank of America Stadium • Charlotte, NC	ESPN	10:30 a.m.	South Carolina	North Carolina	W 38–21	45,520
Music City Bowl	December 30, 2021	Nissan Stadium • Nashville, TN	ESPN	2:00 p.m.	Tennessee	Purdue	L 45–48 OT	69,489
Outback Bowl	January 1, 2022	Raymond James Stadium • Tampa, FL	ESPN2	11:00 a.m.	No. 21 Arkansas	Penn State	W 24–10	46,577
Citrus Bowl	January 1, 2022	Camping World Stadium • Orlando, FL	ABC	12:00 p.m.	No. 22 Kentucky	No. 15 Iowa	W 20–17	50,769
Texas Bowl	January 4, 2022	NRG Stadium • Houston, TX	ESPN	8:00 p.m.	LSU	Kansas State	L 20–42	52,207
New Year's Six Bowls
Sugar Bowl	January 1, 2022	Caesars Superdome • New Orleans, LA	ESPN	7:45 p.m.	No. 8 Ole Miss	No. 7 Baylor	L 7–21	66,479
College Football Playoff bowl games
Cotton Bowl Classic	December 31, 2021	AT&T Stadium • Arlington, Texas	ESPN	2:30 p.m.	No. 1 Alabama	No. 4 Cincinnati	W 27–6	76,313
Orange Bowl	December 31, 2021	Hard Rock Stadium • Miami Gardens, FL	ESPN	6:30 p.m.	No. 3 Georgia	No. 2 Michigan	W 34–11	66,839
CFP National Championship Game	January 10, 2022	Lucas Oil Stadium • Indianapolis, IN	ESPN	7:00 p.m.	No. 1 Alabama	No. 3 Georgia	UGA 33–18	68,311

Rankings are from Final CFP rankings. All times Central Time Zone.

== Head to head matchups ==
Head to head
Team	Alabama	Arkansas	Auburn	Florida	Georgia	LSU	Kentucky	Missouri	Mississippi State	Ole Miss	South Carolina	Tennessee	Texas A&M	Vanderbilt
Alabama	—	1-0	1-0	1-0	1-1	1-0	N/A	N/A	1-0	1-0	N/A	1-0	0-1	N/A
Arkansas	0-1	—	0-1	N/A	0-1	1-0	N/A	1-0	1-0	0-1	N/A	N/A	1-0	N/A
Auburn	0-1	1-0	—	N/A	0-1	1-0	N/A	N/A	0-1	1-0	0-1	N/A	0-1	N/A
Florida	0-1	N/A	N/A	—	0-1	0-1	0-1	0-1	N/A	N/A	0-1	1-0	N/A	1-0
Georgia	1-1	1-0	1-0	1-0	—	N/A	1-0	1-0	N/A	N/A	1-0	1-0	N/A	1-0
LSU	0-1	0-1	0-1	1-0	N/A	—	0-1	N/A	1-0	0-1	N/A	N/A	1-0	N/A
Kentucky	N/A	N/A	N/A	1-0	0-1	1-0	—	1-0	0-1	N/A	1-0	0-1	N/A	1-0
Missouri	N/A	0-1	N/A	1-0	0-1	N/A	0-1	—	N/A	N/A	1-0	0-1	0-1	1-0
Mississippi State	0-1	0-1	1-0	N/A	N/A	0-1	1-0	N/A	—	0-1	N/A	N/A	1-0	1-0
Ole Miss	0-1	1-0	0-1	N/A	N/A	1-0	N/A	N/A	1-0	—	N/A	1-0	1-0	1-0
South Carolina	N/A	N/A	1-0	1-0	0-1	N/A	0-1	0-1	N/A	N/A	—	0-1	0-1	1-0
Tennessee	0-1	N/A	N/A	0-1	0-1	N/A	1-0	1-0	N/A	0-1	1-0	—	N/A	1-0
Texas A&M	1-0	0-1	1-0	N/A	N/A	0-1	N/A	1-0	0-1	0-1	1-0	N/A	—	N/A
Vanderbilt	N/A	N/A	N/A	1-0	0-1	N/A	0-1	0-1	0-1	0-1	0-1	0-1	N/A	—

Updated with the results of all games through December 4, 2021.

=== SEC vs Power Five matchups ===
The following games include SEC teams competing against Power Five conferences teams from the (ACC, Big Ten, Big 12, BYU/Notre Dame and Pac-12). All rankings are from the AP Poll at the time of the game.

Date	Conference	Visitor	Home	Site	Score
September 4	ACC	No. 5 Georgia	No. 3 Clemson	Bank of America Stadium • Charlotte, NC (Duke's Mayo Classic/rivalry)	UGA 10-3
September 4	Pac-12	No. 16 LSU	UCLA	Rose Bowl • Pasadena, CA	UCLA 38–27
September 4	ACC	No. 14 Miami	No. 1 Alabama	Mercedes Benz Stadium • Atlanta, GA (Chick-fil-A Kickoff Game)	ALA 44-13
September 6	ACC	Louisville	Ole Miss	Mercedes Benz Stadium • Atlanta, GA (Chick-fil-A Kickoff Game)	MISS 43–24
September 11	Big 12	No. 15 Texas	Arkansas	Razorback Stadium • Fayetteville, AR	ARK 40—21
September 11	ACC	NC State	Mississippi State	Davis Wade Stadium • Starkville, MS	MSSU 24—10
September 11	ACC	Pittsburgh	Tennessee	Neyland Stadium • Knoxville, TN	PITT 41—34
September 11	Pac-12	No. 5 Texas A&M	Colorado	Empower Field at Mile High • Denver, CO	TAMU 10—7
September 18	Big Ten	No. 22 Auburn	No. 10 Penn State	Beaver Stadium • State College, PA	PSU 28—20
September 18	Pac-12	Stanford	Vanderbilt	Vanderbilt Stadium • Nashville, TN	STAN 41—23
September 25	ACC	Missouri	Boston College	Alumni Stadium • Chestnut Hill, MA	BC 41—34 (OT)
November 27	ACC	Florida State	Florida	Ben Hill Griffin Stadium • Gainesville, FL (rivalry)	UF 24—21
November 27	ACC	Georgia	Georgia Tech	Bobby Dodd Stadium • Atlanta, GA (rivalry)	UGA 45—0
November 27	ACC	Kentucky	Louisville	Cardinal Stadium • Louisville, KY (Governor's Cup)	UK 52—21
November 27	ACC	Clemson	South Carolina	Williams–Brice Stadium • Columbia, SC (rivalry)	CLEM 30—0

=== SEC vs Group of Five matchups ===
The following games include SEC teams competing against "Group of Five" teams from the American, C-USA, MAC, Mountain West and Sun Belt.

Date	Conference	Visitor	Home	Site	Score
September 2	MAC	Bowling Green	Tennessee	Neyland Stadium • Knoxville, TN	UT 38–6
September 4	C-USA	Rice	Arkansas	Razorback Stadium • Fayetteville, AR	ARK 38-17
September 4	C-USA	Florida Atlantic	No. 13 Florida	Ben Hill Griffin Stadium • Gainesville, FL	FLA 35–14
September 4	Sun Belt	Louisiana Monroe	Kentucky	Kroger Field • Lexington, KY	UK 45–10
September 4	MAC	Akron	Auburn	Jordan-Hare Stadium • Auburn, AL	AU 60-10
September 4	MAC	Kent State	No. 6 Texas A&M	Kyle Field • College Station, TX	TAMU 41–10
September 4	C-USA	Louisiana Tech	Mississippi State	Davis Wade Stadium • Starkville, MS	MSSU 35–34
September 4	MAC	Central Michigan	Missouri	Faurot Field • Columbia, MO	MIZZOU 34–24
September 11	Mountain West	Vanderbilt	Colorado State	Canvas Stadium • Fort Collins, CO	VANDY 24–21
September 11	C-USA	UAB	No. 2 Georgia	Sanford Stadium • Athens, GA	UGA 56–7
September 11	American	No. 13 Florida	South Florida	Raymond James Stadium • Tampa, FL	UF 42–0
September 11	American	South Carolina	East Carolina	Dowdy–Ficklen Stadium • Greenville, NC	USC 20–17
September 18	American	Mississippi State	Memphis	Liberty Bowl Memorial Stadium • Memphis, TN	MEM 31–29
September 18	MAC	Central Michigan	LSU	Tiger Stadium • Baton Rouge, LA	LSU 49–21
September 18	American	Tulane	No. 17 Ole Miss	Vaught-Hemingway Stadium • Oxford, MS	MISS 61–21
September 18	Mountain West	New Mexico	No. 7 Texas A&M	Kyle Field • College Station, TX	TAMU 34—0
September 18	Sun Belt	Georgia Southern	No. 20 Arkansas	Razorback Stadium • Fayetteville, AR	ARK 45–10
September 25	C-USA	Southern Miss	No. 1 Alabama	Bryant Denny Stadium • Tuscaloosa, AL	ALA 63–14
September 25	Sun Belt	Georgia State	No. 23 Auburn	Jordan-Hare Stadium • Auburn, AL	AUB 34–24
October 2	Sun Belt	Troy	South Carolina	Williams-Brice Stadium • Columbia, SC	USC 23–14
October 9	C-USA	North Texas	Missouri	Faurot Field • Columbia, MO	MIZZOU 48–35
November 20	Sun Belt	Louisiana Monroe	LSU	Tiger Stadium • Baton Rouge, LA	LSU 27–14
November 20	Sun Belt	South Alabama	Tennessee	Neyland Stadium • Knoxville, TN	TENN 60—14

=== SEC vs FBS independents matchups ===
The following games include SEC teams competing against FBS Independents, which includes Army, Liberty, New Mexico State, UConn or UMass.

Date	Visitor	Home	Site	Score
October 2	UConn	Vanderbilt	Vanderbilt Stadium • Nashville, TN	VAN 30–28
November 6	Liberty	Ole Miss	Vaught-Hemingway Stadium • Oxford, MS	MISS 27–14
November 13	New Mexico State	No. 2 Alabama	Bryant Denny Stadium • Tuscaloosa, AL	UA 59–3
November 20	New Mexico State	Kentucky	Kroger Field • Lexington, KY	UK 56–16

=== SEC vs FCS matchups ===
The Football Championship Subdivision comprises 13 conferences and two independent programs.

Date	Visitor	Home	Site	Score
September 4	Eastern Illinois	South Carolina	Williams-Brice Stadium • Columbia, SC	USC 46—0
September 4	East Tennessee State	Vanderbilt	Vanderbilt Stadium • Nashville, TN	ETSU 23—3
September 11	Mercer	No. 1 Alabama	Bryant Denny Stadium • Tuscaloosa, AL	ALA 48-14
September 11	Alabama State	No. 25 Auburn	Jordan-Hare Stadium • Auburn, AL	AUB 62–0
September 11	McNeese State	LSU	Tiger Stadium • Baton Rouge, LA	LSU 34–7
September 11	Austin Peay	No. 20 Ole Miss	Vaught-Hemingway Stadium • Oxford, MS	MISS 54—17
September 18	Chattanooga	Kentucky	Kroger Field • Lexington, KY	UK 28–23
September 18	Southeast Missouri State	Missouri	Farout Field • Columbia, MO	MIZZOU 59—28
September 18	Tennessee Tech	Tennessee	Neyland Stadium • Knoxville, TN	TENN 56—0
October 23	Arkansas-Pine Bluff	Arkansas	War Memorial Stadium • Little Rock, AR	ARK 45—3
November 13	Samford	Florida	Ben Hill Griffin Stadium • Gainesville, FL	UF 70—52
November 20	Charleston Southern	Georgia	Sanford Stadium • Athens, GA	UGA 56—7
November 20	Tennessee State	Mississippi State	Davis Wade Stadium • Starkville, MS	MISS ST 55—10
November 20	Prairie View A&M	Texas A&M	Kyle Field • College Station, TX	TAMU 52—3

=== SEC records against other conferences ===
2021–2022 records against non-conference foes:

Regular season

Power Conferences 5	Record
ACC	7–3
Big 12	1–0
Big Ten	0–1
BYU/Notre Dame	0–0
Pac-12	1–2
Power 5 total	9–6
Other FBS conferences	Record
American	3–1
C–USA	6–0
Independents (excluding BYU/Notre Dame)	4–0
MAC	5–0
Mountain West	2–0
Sun Belt	6–0
Other FBS total	26–1
FCS opponents	Record
Football Championship Subdivision	13–1
Total non-conference record	48–8

Post season

Power Conferences 5	Record
ACC	1–0
Big Ten	2–1
Big 12	0–2
BYU/Notre Dame	0-0
Pac-12	0–0
Power 5 total	3–3
Other FBS conferences	Record
American	1–2
C–USA	0–0
Independents (excluding BYU/Notre Dame)	0–1
MAC	0–0
Mountain West	0–0
Sun Belt	0-0
Other FBS total	1–3
Total bowl record	4–6

== Awards and honors ==
=== SEC individual season awards ===
The following individuals received postseason honors as voted by the SEC Conference football coaches at the end of the season

Award	Winner	Pos.	Team
Offensive Player of the Year	Bryce Young, So.	QB	Alabama
Defensive Player of the Year	Will Anderson Jr. So.	LB	Alabama
Special Teams Player of the Year	Jameson Williams, Jr.	WR	Alabama
Special Teams Player of the Year	Velus Jones Jr., GS.	WR	Tennessee
Freshman of the Year	Brock Bowers, Fr.	TE	Georgia
Jacobs Blocking Trophy	Darian Kinnard, Sr.	OL	Kentucky
Scholar Athlete of the Year	Tyler Badie, Sr.	RB	Missouri
Coach of the Year	Kirby Smart	HC	Georgia

=== All-conference teams ===
The following players earned First Team All-SEC honors. Any teams showing (_) following their name are indicating the number of All-SEC Conference Honors awarded to that university for 1st team and 2nd team respectively.

Offense

Position	Player	Class	Team
QB	Bryce Young	So.	Alabama
RB	Tyler Badie	Sr.	Missouri
RB	Brian Robinson Jr.	GS	Alabama (2)
WR	Jameson Williams	Jr.	Alabama (3)
WR	Treylon Burks	Jr.	Arkansas
TE	Brock Bowers	Fr.	Georgia
OL	Darian Kinnard	Sr.	Kentucky
OL	Evan Neal	Jr.	Alabama (4)
OL	Kenyon Green	Jr.	Texas A&M
OL	Charles Cross	(redshirt) So.	Mississippi State
OL	Luke Fortner	GS	Kentucky (2)

Defense

Position	Player	Class	Team
DL	Jordan Davis	Sr.	Georgia (2)
DL	Sam Williams	Sr.	Ole Miss
DL	DeMarvin Leal	Jr.	Texas A&M (2)
DL	Devonte Wyatt	Sr.	Georgia (3)
LB	Will Anderson Jr.	So.	Alabama (5)
LB	Nakobe Dean	Jr.	Georgia (4)
LB	Damone Clark	Sr.	LSU
DB	Roger McCreary	Sr.	Auburn
DB	Jordan Battle	So.	Alabama (6)
DB	Jaylan Foster	GS	South Carolina
DB	Montaric Brown	GS	Arkansas (2)

Special teams

Position	Player	Class	Team
PK	Harrison Mevis	So.	Missouri (2)
P	Jake Camarda	Sr.	Georgia (5)
RT	Velus Jones Jr.	GS	Tennessee
AP	Velus Jones Jr.	GS	Tennessee (2)

Notes:

- RS = Return specialist
- AP/ST = All-purpose/Special Teams player (not a kicker or returner)
- † Two-time first team selection
- ‡ Three-time first team selection

Honorable mentions

- Alabama:
- Arkansas:
- Auburn:
- Florida:
- Georgia:
- Kentucky:
- LSU:
- Mississippi State:
- Missouri:
- Ole Miss:
- South Carolina:
- Tennessee:
- Texas A&M:
- Vanderbilt:

=== Players of the week ===
Week	Offensive Player of the Week	Defensive Player of the Week	Special Teams Player of the Week	Offensive Line Player of the Week	Defensive Line Player of the Week	Freshman Player of the Week
1	Bryce Young QB (Alabama)	Christopher Smith II S (Georgia)	Will Reichard PK (Alabama)	Kenyon Green OL (Texas A&M) Luke Fortner OL (Kentucky)	Jordan Davis DL (Georgia) Zachary Carter DL (Florida)	Debo Williams LB (South Carolina) Caden Costa PK (Ole Miss)
2	Chris Rodriguez Jr. RB (Kentucky) Stetson Bennett QB (Georgia)	Hayden Henry LB (Arkansas)	Parker White PK (South Carolina) Joseph Bulovas PK (Vanderbilt)	Charles Cross OL (Mississippi State)	Jayden Peevy DL (Texas A&M)	Cam Little PK (Arkansas)
3	Matt Corral QB (Ole Miss)	Will Anderson Jr. LB (Alabama) Nolan Smith OLB (Georgia)	Nik Constantinou P (Texas A&M)	Jeremy James OL (Ole Miss) Ricky Stromberg OL (Arkansas)	BJ Ojulari DE (LSU)	Adonai Mitchell WR (Georgia)
4	Emory Jones QB (Florida) Treylon Burks WR (Arkansas)	Damone Clark LB (LSU)	Jameson Williams WR/KR (Alabama)	Luke Fortner OL (Kentucky)	Tre Williams DE (Arkansas)	Brock Bowers TE (Georgia)
5	Brian Robinson Jr. RB (Alabama) Will Rogers QB (Auburn) Bo Nix QB (Mississippi State)	Jacquez Jones LB (Kentucky) Will Anderson Jr. LB (Alabama)	Joseph Bulovas PK (Vanderbilt) Josh Paschal DE (Kentucky)	Cade Mays OL (Tennessee)	Devonte Wyatt DL (Georgia)	Len'Neth Whitehead RB (Tennessee) Jarquez Hunter RB (Auburn)
6	Zach Calzada QB (Texas A&M)	Brandon Turnage DB (Tennessee)	De’Von Achane RB/KR (Texas A&M)	Nick Broeker OL (Ole Miss) Eli Cox OL (Kentucky)	Tyree Johnson DL (Texas A&M) Octavious Oxendine DL (Kentucky)	Ladd McConkey WR (Georgia)
7	Tyrion Davis-Price RB (LSU) Matt Corral QB (Ole Miss)	Will Anderson Jr. LB (Alabama)	Kai Kroeger P (South Carolina)	Kenyon Green OL (Texas A&M)	Colby Wooden DL (Auburn) Jalen Carter DL (Georgia)	Brock Bowers TE (Georgia)
8	Bryce Young QB (Alabama)	Chance Campbell LB (Ole Miss)	Ainias Smith RB/WR/PR (Texas A&M)	Kenyon Green OL (Texas A&M) Charles Cross OL (Mississippi State)	Sam Williams DL (Ole Miss) Tyree Johnson DL (Texas A&M)	RaRa Thomas WR (Mississippi State)
9	Will Rogers QB (Mississippi State) Tyler Badie RB (Missouri)	Zakoby McClain LB (Auburn) Nolan Smith LB (Georgia)	Harrison Mevis PK (Missouri)	LaQuinston Sharp OL (Mississippi State)	Colby Wooden DL (Auburn)	Trevin Wallace LB (Kentucky)
10	Hendon Hooker QB (Tennessee)	Will Anderson Jr. LB (Alabama)	Seth Small PK (Texas A&M) Parker White PK (South Carolina)	Cade Mays OL (Tennessee)	Tyree Johnson DL (Texas A&M)	Cam Little PK (Arkansas)
11	Will Rogers QB (Mississippi State)	Channing Tindall LB (Georgia)	Cam Little PK (Arkansas)	Caleb Warren OL (Ole Miss) Darian Kinnard OL (Kentucky)	Isaiah McGuire DL (Missouri)	Caden Costa PK (Ole Miss)
12	Bryce Young QB (Alabama)	Henry To'oTo'o LB (Alabama)	Velus Jones Jr. WR/KR (Tennessee) Harrison Mevis PK (Missouri)	Caleb Warren OL (Ole Miss) Jovaughn Gwyn OL (South Carolina)	Trajan Jeffcoat DL (Missouri)	Trai Jones FB (South Carolina)
13	Treylon Burks WR (Arkansas)	Will Anderson Jr. LB (Alabama) Damone Clark LB (LSU)	Cade York PK (LSU)	Darian Kinnard OL (Kentucky)	Sam Williams DL (Ole Miss)	Jaylen Wright RB (Tennessee)

== Home game attendance ==
Team	Stadium	Capacity	Game 1	Game 2	Game 3	Game 4	Game 5	Game 6	Game 7	Game 8	Total	Average	% of Capacity
Alabama	Bryant–Denny Stadium	101,821	95,396	100,077	100,077	100,077	100,077	97,011	98,323	-	395,627	98,907	97.14%
Arkansas	Donald W. Reynolds Razorback Stadium	76,212	64,065	74,531	66,311	73,370	42,576 ^{A}	68,818	67,320	-	211,966	70,655	92.71%
Auburn	Jordan–Hare Stadium	87,451	83,821	82,745	86,650	87,451+	87,451+	87,451+	87,451+	-	428,118	85,624	97.91%
Florida	Ben Hill Griffin Stadium	88,548	86,840	90,887	88,478	86,258	70,098	88,491	-	-	352,463	88,113	99.51%
Georgia	Sanford Stadium	92,746	92,746	92,746	92,746	92,746	92,746	92,746	-	-	370,984	92,746	100%
Kentucky	Kroger Field	61,000	47,693	58,437	55,214	61,632+	61,690+	61,690+	47,749	-	222,976	55,744	91.38%
LSU	Tiger Stadium	102,321	94,220	92,547	97,717	96,012	98,772	92,790	91,595	-	380,496	95,124	92.97%
Mississippi State	Davis Wade Stadium	61,337	44,669	45,834	50,298	53,796	49,487	46,770	55,601	-	244,084	48,817	79.59%
Missouri	Faurot Field	71,168	46,327	46,598	45,655	46,985	48,139	44,092	47,818	-	186,629	46,657	65.56%
Ole Miss	Vaught–Hemingway Stadium	64,038	47,848	54,198	60,256	64,523+	53,235	64,425+	50,819	-	226,825	56,706	88.55%
South Carolina	Williams–Brice Stadium	80,250	64,868	77,559	60,866	64,695	70,131	70,299	79,897	-	267,988	66,997	83.49%
Tennessee	Neyland Stadium	102,455	84,314	82,203	80,053	89,437	102,455+	100,074	75,203	77,349	349,025	87,256	85.17%
Texas A&M	Kyle Field	102,733	97,339	84,748	87,973	106,815+	103,889+	109,835+	98,251	-	376,875	94,219	91.71%
Vanderbilt	Vanderbilt Stadium	40,550	22,029	21,124	32,178	21,218	22,036	19,821	25,798	-	116,370	23,274	57.4%

^A Game played at Arkansas' secondary home stadium War Memorial Stadium, capacity: 54,120.

== NFL draft ==
=== Total picks by school ===
Team	Round 1	Round 2	Round 3	Round 4	Round 5	Round 6	Round 7	Total
Alabama	2	2	2	1	–	–	–	7
Arkansas	1	–	–	–	1	–	1	3
Auburn	–	1	–	–	–	–	–	1
Florida	1	–	1	1	–	–	–	3
Georgia	5	2	2	2	–	4	–	15
Kentucky	–	2	1	–	1	–	–	4
LSU	1	1	2	2	1	2	1	10
Mississippi State	1	–	1	–	–	–	–	2
Missouri	–	–	–	1	–	1	–	2
Ole Miss	–	1	1	–	1	1	2	6
South Carolina	–	–	–	–	1	1	1	3
Tennessee	–	1	1	–	1	2	–	5
Texas A&M	1	–	1	2	–	–	–	4
Vanderbilt	–	–	–	–	–	–	–	0
Total	12	10	12	9	6	11	5	65

=== List of selections ===
The following list includes all SEC players drafted in the 2022 NFL draft:

Player	Position	School	Draft round	Round pick	Overall pick	Team
Travon Walker	DE	Georgia	1	1	1	Jacksonville Jaguars
Derek Stingley Jr.	CB	LSU	1	3	3	Houston Texans
Evan Neal	OT	Alabama	1	7	7	New York Giants
Charles Cross	OT	Mississippi State	1	9	9	Seattle Seahawks
Jameson Williams	WR	Alabama	1	12	12	Detroit Lions
Jordan Davis	DT	Georgia	1	13	13	Philadelphia Eagles
Kenyon Green	OG	Texas A&M	1	15	15	Houston Texans
Treylon Burks	WR	Arkansas	1	18	18	Tennessee Titans
Quay Walker	LB	Georgia	1	22	22	Green Bay Packers
Kaiir Elam	CB	Florida	1	23	23	Buffalo Bills
Devonte Wyatt	DT	Georgia	1	28	28	Green Bay Packers
Lewis Cine	S	Georgia	1	32	32	Minnesota Vikings
Roger McCreary	CB	Auburn	2	3	35	Tennessee Titans
Wan'Dale Robinson	WR	Kentucky	2	11	43	New York Giants
John Metchie III	WR	Alabama	2	12	44	Houston Texans
Josh Paschal	DE	Kentucky	2	14	46	Detroit Lions
Phidarian Mathis	DT	Alabama	2	15	47	Washington Commanders
Alontae Taylor	CB	Tennessee	2	17	49	New Orleans Saints
George Pickens	WR	Georgia	2	20	52	Pittsburgh Steelers
Sam Williams	DE	Ole Miss	2	24	56	Dallas Cowboys
Ed Ingram	OG	LSU	2	27	59	Minnesota Vikings
James Cook	RB	Georgia	2	31	63	Buffalo Bills
Luke Fortner	C	Kentucky	3	1	65	Jacksonville Jaguars
Martin Emerson	CB	Mississippi State	3	4	68	Cleveland Browns
Velus Jones Jr.	WR	Tennessee	3	7	71	Chicago Bears
Christian Harris	LB	Alabama	3	11	75	Houston Texans
Cordale Flott	CB	LSU	3	17	81	New York Giants
Nakobe Dean	LB	Georgia	3	19	83	Philadelphia Eagles
DeMarvin Leal	DE	Texas A&M	3	20	84	Pittsburgh Steelers
Tyrion Davis-Price	RB	LSU	3	29	93	San Francisco 49ers
Matt Corral	QB	Ole Miss	3	30	94	Carolina Panthers
Zachary Carter	DT	Florida	3	31	95	Cincinnati Bengals
Brian Robinson Jr.	RB	Alabama	3	34	98	Washington Commanders
Channing Tindall	LB	Georgia	3	38	102	Miami Dolphins
Dameon Pierce	RB	Florida	4	2	107	Houston Texans
Micheal Clemons	DE	Texas A&M	4	12	117	New York Jets
Akayleb Evans	CB	Missouri	4	13	118	Minnesota Vikings
Jalyn Armour-Davis	CB	Alabama	4	14	119	Baltimore Ravens
Zamir White	RB	Georgia	4	17	122	Las Vegas Raiders
Isaiah Spiller	RB	Texas A&M	4	18	123	Los Angeles Chargers
Cade York	K	LSU	4	19	124	Cleveland Browns
Neil Farrell Jr.	DT	LSU	4	21	126	Las Vegas Raiders
Jake Camarda	P	Georgia	4	28	133	Tampa Bay Buccaneers
Darian Kinnard	OT	Kentucky	5	2	145	Kansas City Chiefs
Snoop Conner	RB	Ole Miss	5	11	154	Jacksonville Jaguars
Matthew Butler	DT	Tennessee	5	32	175	Las Vegas Raiders
Damone Clark	LB	LSU	5	33	176	Dallas Cowboys
John Ridgeway III	DT	Arkansas	5	35	178	Dallas Cowboys
Kingsley Enagbare	DE	South Carolina	5	36	179	Green Bay Packers
Kevin Harris	RB	South Carolina	6	4	183	New England Patriots
Justin Shaffer	OG	Georgia	6	11	190	Atlanta Falcons
Jamaree Salyer	OG	Georgia	6	16	195	Los Angeles Chargers
Tyler Badie	RB	Missouri	6	17	196	Baltimore Ravens
Cade Mays	OG	Tennessee	6	20	199	Carolina Panthers
Theo Jackson	S	Tennessee	6	25	204	Tennessee Titans
Austin Deculus	OT	LSU	6	26	205	Houston Texans
Chasen Hines	OG	LSU	6	31	210	New England Patriots
Derion Kendrick	CB	Georgia	6	33	212	Los Angeles Rams
John FitzPatrick	TE	Georgia	6	34	213	Atlanta Falcons
Chance Campbell	LB	Ole Miss	6	40	219	Tennessee Titans
Montaric Brown	CB	Arkansas	7	1	222	Jacksonville Jaguars
Mark Robinson	LB	Ole Miss	7	4	225	Pittsburgh Steelers
Nick Muse	TE	South Carolina	7	6	227	Minnesota Vikings
Deane Leonard	CB	Ole Miss	7	15	236	Los Angeles Chargers
Andre Anthony	DE	LSU	7	27	248	Tampa Bay Buccaneers
