= 2019 college football recruiting class =

Recruiting of students for US college football

The college football recruiting class of 2019 refers to the recruiting of high school athletes to play college football starting in the fall of 2019. The scope of this article covers: (a) the colleges and universities with recruiting classes ranking among the top 20 in the country as assessed by at least one of the major media companies, and (b) the individual recruits ranking among the top 20 in the country as assessed by at least one of the major media companies.

== Top ranked classes ==
School	247	Rivals	On3
Alabama	1	2	1
Georgia	2	1	2
Texas	3	4	3
Texas A&M	4	6	4
LSU	5	3	5
Oklahoma	6	5	6
Oregon	7	7	8
Michigan	8	10	7
Florida	9	8	11
Clemson	10	9	9
Auburn	11	12	12
Penn State	12	11	10
Tennessee	13	13	13
Ohio State	14	21	16
Notre Dame	15	14	15
Washington	16	16	14
Nebraska	17	15	17
Florida State	18	17	20
Stanford	19	24	24
USC	20	18	21
South Carolina	21	19	23
Arkansas	23	20	18
Ole Miss	22	22	19

== Top ranked recruits ==
Player	Position	School	Rivals	247Sports	USA Today	ESPN
Derek Stingley Jr.	Cornerback	LSU	1	3	3	18
Nolan Smith	Linebacker	Georgia	2	1	1	2
Trey Sanders	Running back	Alabama	3	6	6	16
Jadon Haselwood	Wide receiver	Oklahoma	4	4	4	6
Antonio Alfano	Defensive tackle	Alabama	5	5	5	28
Kayvon Thibodeaux	Defensive end	Oregon	6	2	2	1
George Pickens	Wide receiver	Georgia	7	24	23	54
Evan Neal	Offensive tackle	Alabama	8	7	14	4
Zacch Pickens	Defensive end	South Carolina	9	8	11	20
DeMarvin Leal	Defensive end	Texas A&M	10	16	20	60
Theo Wease	Wide receiver	Oklahoma	11	21	15	33
Bru McCoy	Athlete	Texas	12	9	9	27
Spencer Rattler	Quarterback	Oklahoma	13	11	10	29
Andrew Booth Jr.	Cornerback	Clemson	14	23	28	34
Chris Hinton	Defensive tackle	Michigan	15	31	31	48
Darnell Wright	Offensive tackle	Tennessee	16	10	7	5
Charles Cross	Offensive tackle	Mississippi State	17	27	27	84
Marcel Brooks	Linebacker	LSU	18	32	33	86
Chris Steele	Cornerback	Florida	19	42	41	95
Trey Palmer	Wide receiver	LSU	20	112	109	133
Zach Harrison	Defensive end	Ohio State	23	12	8	10
John Emery Jr.	Running back	LSU	36	13	17	11
Daxton Hill	Safety	Michigan	24	14	11	13
Kenyon Green	Offensive tackle	Texas A&M	22	15	13	3
Logan Brown	Offensive tackle	Wisconsin	47	17	15	15
Brandon Smith	Linebacker	Penn State	39	18	20	22
Nakobe Dean	Linebacker	Georgia	31	19	19	24
Garrett Wilson	Wide receiver	Ohio State	32	20	18	17
Pierce Quick	Offensive tackle	Alabama	82	40	40	7
Owen Pappoe	Linebacker	Auburn	59	25	24	8
Wanya Morris	Offensive tackle	Tennessee	41	28	20	9
Devontae Dobbs	Offensive tackle	Michigan State	122	51	44	12
Clay Webb	Center	Georgia	28	26	25	14
Jerrion Ealy	Running back	Ole Miss	58	29	29	19
