= Ed Ingram =

American football player (born 1999)

No. 69 – Houston Texans
- Position: Guard
- Roster status: Active

Personal information
- Born: February 11, 1999 (age 27); DeSoto, Texas, U.S.
- Listed height: 6 ft 3 in (1.91 m)
- Listed weight: 307 lb (139 kg)

Career information
- High school: DeSoto
- College: LSU (2017–2021)
- NFL draft: 2022: 2nd round, 59th overall pick

Career history
- Minnesota Vikings (2022–2024); Houston Texans (2025–present)

Awards and highlights
- CFP national champion (2019); Second-team All-SEC (2021)

Career NFL statistics as of Week 5, 2026
- Games played: 65
- Games started: 58
- Stats at Pro Football Reference

Edward Ingram (born February 11, 1999) is an American professional football guard for the Houston Texans of the National Football League (NFL). He played college football for the LSU Tigers and was drafted in the second round of the 2022 NFL draft by the Minnesota Vikings.

== Early life ==
Ingram attended DeSoto High School in DeSoto, Texas.

== College career ==
Ingram played guard for the LSU Tigers of Louisiana State University.

== Professional career ==
Pre-draft measurables
Height	Weight	Arm length	Hand span	Wingspan	40-yard dash	10-yard split	20-yard split	20-yard shuttle	Three-cone drill	Vertical jump	Broad jump
6 ft 3 1/4 in (1.91 m)	307 lb (139 kg)	33 5/8 in (0.85 m)	10 in (0.25 m)	6 ft 9 7/8 in (2.08 m)	5.02 s	1.73 s	2.88 s	4.76 s	7.81 s	20.5 in (0.52 m)	8 ft 6 in (2.59 m)
All values from NFL Combine

=== Minnesota Vikings ===
Ingram was drafted by the Minnesota Vikings with the 59th pick in the second round of the 2022 NFL draft. As a rookie, he appeared in and started all 17 games.

=== Houston Texans ===
On March 13, 2025, Ingram was traded to the Houston Texans for a 2026 sixth-round pick. He was the starting right guard for the majority of the 2025 season, starting 14 games.

On March 10, 2026, Ingram signed a three-year, $37.5 million contract extension with the Texans.

== Personal life ==
In August 2018, Ingram was arrested on two counts of aggravated sexual assault of a minor, stemming from events that occurred in 2015. After charges were dismissed in September 2019, Ingram was reinstated to the team from his indefinite suspension.
