= Jalen Wydermyer =

American football player (born 2000)

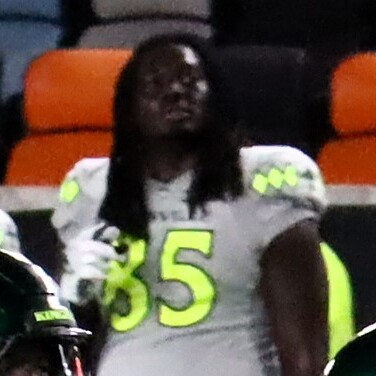
- Wydermyer with the Louisville Kings in 2026

No. 85 – Louisville Kings
- Position: Tight end
- Roster status: Active

Personal information
- Born: December 20, 2000 (age 25); Dickinson, Texas, U.S.
- Listed height: 6 ft 4 in (1.93 m)
- Listed weight: 257 lb (117 kg)

Career information
- High school: Dickinson (Dickinson, Texas)
- College: Texas A&M (2019–2021)
- NFL draft: 2022: undrafted

Career history
- Buffalo Bills (2022)*; New England Patriots (2022)*; Indianapolis Colts (2022)*; Michigan Panthers (2025); Louisville Kings (2026–present)
- * Offseason or practice squad member only

Awards and highlights
- UFL champion (2026); 3× Second-team All-SEC (2019–2021)
- Stats at Pro Football Reference

Jalen Wydermyer (born December 20, 2000) is an American professional football tight end for the Louisville Kings of the United Football League (UFL). He played college football at Texas A&M, where he was a three-time all-SEC second-team selection.

== Early life ==
Wydermyer grew up in Dickinson, Texas and attended Dickinson High School. As senior, he caught 42 passes for 875 yards with 10 touchdowns. Rated a four star recruit, Wydermyer committed to play college football at Texas A&M over Miami.

== College career ==
As a freshman, Wydermyer had larger role in Texas A&M's offense than originally expected after fellow freshman Baylor Cupp suffered a season ending injury towards the end of training camp. Wydermyer finished the season with 32 catches for 447 yards and six touchdowns and was named the Southeastern Conference (SEC) All-Freshman team and second-team All-SEC by the Associated Press. Wydermyer was named preseason All-SEC and to the Mackey Award watchlist going into his sophomore season. Wydermyer received second-team all-SEC honors in 2020.

During the 2021 season, Wydermyer recorded 40 receptions for 515 yards. He was named a finalist for the John Mackey Award for the second time, but the 2021 award was ultimately given to Trey McBride.

Wydermyer decided to forgo his final year of eligibility to enter the 2022 NFL draft. He holds the school record among tight ends in career receptions, receiving yards and touchdown catches.

=== College statistics ===
Jalen Wydermyer		Receiving			
Year	G	Rec	Yds	Avg	TD
2019	13	32	447	14.0	6
2020	10	46	506	11.0	6
2021	12	40	515	12.9	4
Career	35	118	1,468	12.4	16

== Professional career ==
Pre-draft measurables
Height	Weight	Arm length	Hand span	Wingspan	40-yard dash	10-yard split	20-yard split	Vertical jump	Broad jump
6 ft 3 7/8 in (1.93 m)	255 lb (116 kg)	33 1/8 in (0.84 m)	9 3/4 in (0.25 m)	6 ft 9 in (2.06 m)	5.02 s	1.78 s	2.89 s	25.5 in (0.65 m)	9 ft 1 in (2.77 m)
All values from NFL Combine/Pro Day

=== Buffalo Bills ===
Wydermyer signed with the Buffalo Bills as an undrafted free agent on May 13, 2022. He was waived by Buffalo on August 14.

=== New England Patriots ===
Wydermyer signed with the New England Patriots on August 18, 2022. He was waived on August 30, and re-signed to the practice squad the next day. Wydermyer was released on September 20.

=== Indianapolis Colts ===
Wydermyer was signed to the Indianapolis Colts practice squad on October 17, 2022. He was waived on May 4, 2023.

=== Michigan Panthers ===
On January 13, 2025, Wydermyer signed with the Michigan Panthers of the United Football League (UFL).

On July 4, 2025, Wydermyer re-signed with the Panthers.

=== Louisville Kings ===
On January 13, 2026, Wydermyer was selected by the Louisville Kings in the 2026 UFL draft.
