= Zakoby McClain =

American football player (born 2000)

Profile
- Position: Linebacker

Personal information
- Born: March 7, 2000 (age 26); Valdosta, Georgia, U.S.
- Listed height: 6 ft 0 in (1.83 m)
- Listed weight: 230 lb (104 kg)

Career information
- High school: Valdosta
- College: Auburn (2018–2021)
- NFL draft: 2022: undrafted

Career history
- Baltimore Ravens (2022)*; New Orleans Breakers (2023); Saskatchewan Roughriders (2024)
- * Offseason or practice squad member only

Awards and highlights
- Second-team All-SEC (2021)

Zakoby McClain (born March 7, 2000) is an American former football linebacker. He played college football at Auburn.

== Early life ==
McClain attended Valdosta High School in Valdosta, Georgia. Coming out of high school, McClain was a 4-star prospect. He was ranked the 13th best outside linebacker prospect and 24th best prospect from the state of Georgia. McClain committed to Auburn over LSU, Tennessee and many other programs.

== College career ==
McClain played very little his freshman season. As a sophomore, McClain became a full time starter, and in the 2019 Iron Bowl against rival Alabama, he had a 99-yard Pick Six that helped propel the Tigers to a 48–45 upset. In his junior season, McClain led the nation in total tackles with 113. In his senior season, McClain was named to the Second-team All-SEC Team. On December 27, McClain announced he would skip Auburn's bowl game and enter the NFL draft.

== Professional career ==
Pre-draft measurables
Height	Weight	Arm length	Hand span	Wingspan	40-yard dash	10-yard split	20-yard split	20-yard shuttle	Three-cone drill	Vertical jump	Broad jump	Bench press
5 ft 11 3/8 in (1.81 m)	228 lb (103 kg)	31 3/4 in (0.81 m)	9 1/4 in (0.23 m)	6 ft 3 1/4 in (1.91 m)	4.65 s	1.63 s	2.75 s	4.59 s	7.40 s	33.0 in (0.84 m)	9 ft 9 in (2.97 m)	21 reps
All values from NFL Combine/Pro Day

McClain signed with the Baltimore Ravens after going undrafted in the 2022 NFL draft. He was waived on August 30.

McClain signed with the New Orleans Breakers on January 7, 2023. The Breakers folded when the XFL and USFL merged to create the United Football League (UFL).

On January 30, 2024, McClain signed with the Saskatchewan Roughriders of the Canadian Football League (CFL). He was released on August 15, 2024.

== See also ==
- List of NCAA major college football yearly tackles leaders
