= Austin Deculus =

American football player (born 1999)

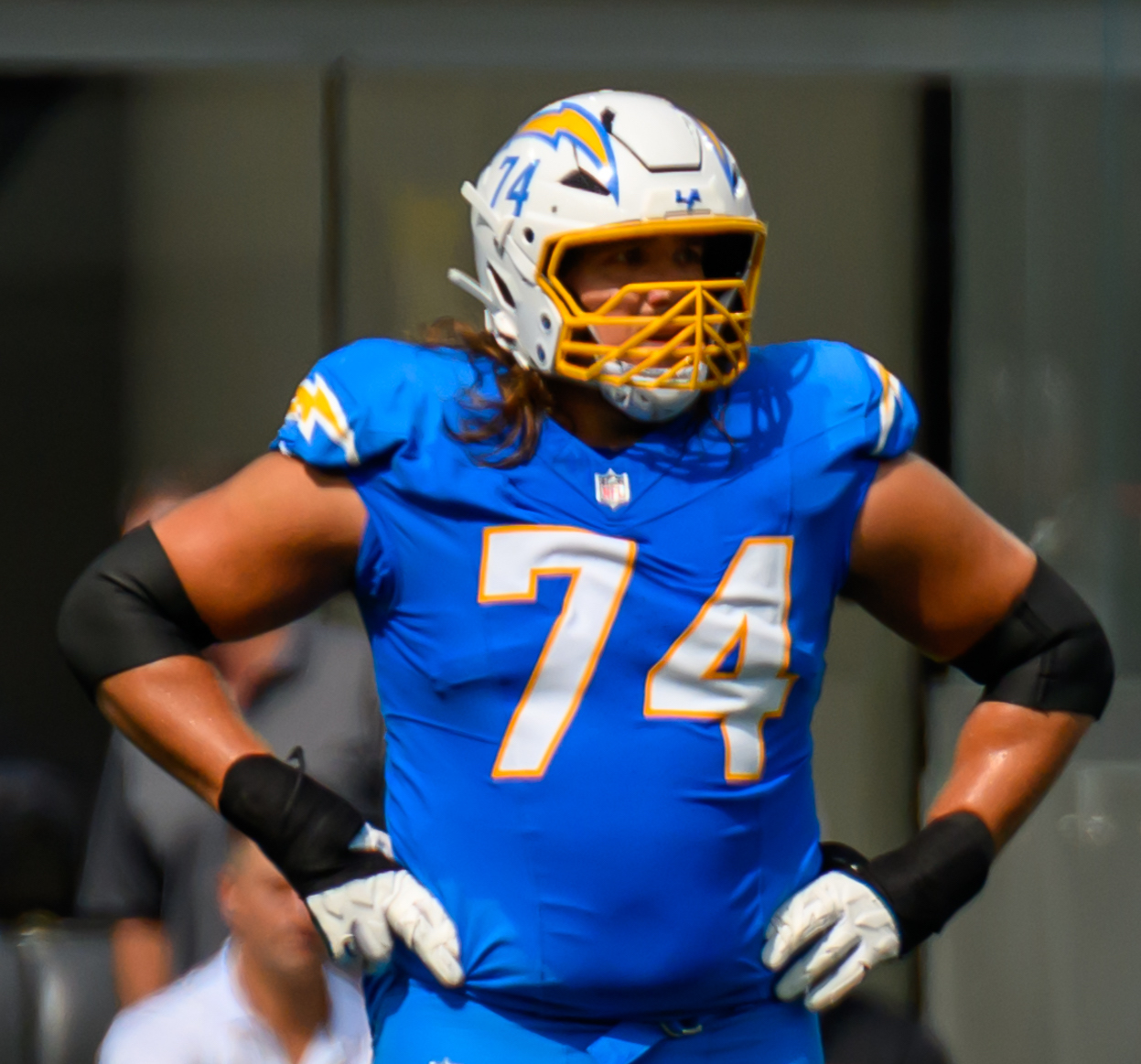
- Deculus with the Los Angeles Chargers in 2025

No. 75 – Arizona Cardinals
- Position: Offensive tackle
- Roster status: Practice squad

Personal information
- Born: March 12, 1999 (age 27); Mamou, Louisiana, U.S.
- Listed height: 6 ft 5 in (1.96 m)
- Listed weight: 330 lb (150 kg)

Career information
- High school: Cy-Fair (Cypress, Texas)
- College: LSU (2017–2021)
- NFL draft: 2022: 6th round, 205th overall pick

Career history
- Houston Texans (2022–2023); New York Jets (2023); New Orleans Saints (2024); Houston Texans (2024); Los Angeles Chargers (2025); Tennessee Titans (2026)*; Arizona Cardinals (2026–present)*
- * Offseason or practice squad member only

Awards and highlights
- CFP national champion (2019)

Career NFL statistics as of 2025
- Games played: 26
- Games started: 6
- Stats at Pro Football Reference

Austin Deculus (born March 12, 1999) is an American professional football offensive tackle for the Arizona Cardinals of the National Football League (NFL). He played college football for the LSU Tigers.

== Early life ==
Deculus was born in Mamou, Louisiana, but grew up in Cypress, Texas, where he attended Cy-Fair High School. He was highly regarded as an offensive line prospect coming out of high school, being ranked the No. 5 offensive tackle prospect by ESPN.

== College career ==
In his freshman season at LSU in 2017, Deculus played in all 13 games on special teams, appearing only twice on the offensive line due to injuries to the team's starters.

In the second week of his sophomore season in 2018, Deculus had his first start at left tackle in a game against Southeastern Louisiana. He shifted to right tackle the following week and started there for the remainder of the season. He finished the year with a total of 827 snaps played, including all 86 snaps in the Fiesta Bowl.

Deculus was considered the "most improved" offensive lineman at LSU in 2019 and started 13 games, missing two due to injury. He played every snap in the Tigers' national championship win over Clemson, totaling 885 snaps over the whole season.

Deculus started all ten games at right tackle in 2020, and was named to the 2020 Southeastern Conference Academic Honor Roll.

Deculus took advantage of an extra year of eligibility due to the COVID-19 pandemic as he entered his fifth year playing for the Tigers. In 12 games in 2021, he played a total of 829 snaps, and recorded his only college football tackle in a game against UCLA.

== Professional career ==
Pre-draft measurables
Height	Weight	Arm length	Hand span	Wingspan	40-yard dash	10-yard split	20-yard split	20-yard shuttle	Vertical jump	Broad jump	Bench press
6 ft 5 in (1.96 m)	321 lb (146 kg)	34 3/8 in (0.87 m)	9 1/4 in (0.23 m)	6 ft 10 1/2 in (2.10 m)	5.06 s	1.75 s	2.81 s	4.99 s	28.5 in (0.72 m)	9 ft 1 in (2.77 m)	24 reps
All values from NFL Combine/Pro Day

=== Houston Texans (first stint) ===
Deculus was selected in the sixth round of the 2022 NFL draft by the Houston Texans with the 205th pick overall. The Texans had previously selected his LSU teammate Derek Stingley Jr. in the first round of the draft.

On August 29, 2023, Deculus was waived by the Texans and re-signed to the practice squad. He was promoted to the active roster on September 30. He was waived on November 11.

=== New York Jets ===
On November 13, 2023, Deculus was claimed off waivers by the New York Jets.

On August 27, 2024, Deculus was waived by the Jets as part of final roster cuts.

=== New Orleans Saints ===
On August 29, 2024, Deculus was signed to the New Orleans Saints' practice squad. He was elevated for the Saints' Week 17 game against the Las Vegas Raiders, but did not play any snaps.

=== Houston Texans (second stint) ===
On December 31, 2024, the Deculus was signed off the Saints' practice squad by the Houston Texans.

=== Los Angeles Chargers ===
On August 26, 2025, Deculus was traded to the Los Angeles Chargers in exchange for a conditional 2027 seventh round pick.

=== Tennessee Titans ===
On March 18, 2026, Deculus signed with the Tennessee Titans. He was waived by the Titans on August 31.

=== Arizona Cardinals ===
On October 6, 2026, Deculus signed with the Arizona Cardinals practice squad. He was released on October 22 and re-signed five days later.

== Personal life ==
Deculus is a Christian.

Deculus married Sydney Taylor on April 18, 2025.
