= Isaiah Spiller =

American football player (born 2001)

Profile
- Position: Running back

Personal information
- Born: August 9, 2001 (age 25); Spring, Texas, U.S.
- Listed height: 6 ft 0 in (1.83 m)
- Listed weight: 217 lb (98 kg)

Career information
- High school: Klein Collins (Spring)
- College: Texas A&M (2019–2021)
- NFL draft: 2022: 4th round, 123rd overall pick

Career history
- Los Angeles Chargers (2022–2023); Las Vegas Raiders (2024)*
- * Offseason or practice squad member only

Awards and highlights
- First-team All-SEC (2020); Second-team All-SEC (2021)

Career NFL statistics as of 2024
- Rushing yards: 137
- Rushing average: 2.5
- Receptions: 9
- Receiving yards: 47
- Stats at Pro Football Reference

Isaiah Spiller (born August 9, 2001) is an American professional football running back. He played college football for the Texas A&M Aggies, and was selected by the Los Angeles Chargers in the fourth round of the 2022 NFL draft.

== Early life ==
Spiller attended Klein Collins High School in Spring, Texas. During his career he had 3,587 yards from scrimmage and 53 touchdowns. Spiller played in the 2019 Under Armour All-America Game. He committed to Texas A&M University to play college football.

Spiller wears #28 as a tribute to former NFL running back CJ Spiller, who played for five teams over eight seasons. The two are not related, but Isaiah would often watch C. J.'s highlights and imagine himself in the NFL.

== College career ==
As a true freshman at Texas A&M in 2019, Spiller started nine of the 13 games. He was named freshman All-SEC after rushing for 946 yards on 174 carries with 10 touchdowns. He returned as the starter his sophomore year in 2020. During the 2020 season, in which he rushed 188 times for 1,036 yards and 9 touchdowns, Spiller was named to the all-SEC Coaches' first team. On December 14, 2021, after a season in which he rushed 179 times for 1,011 yards and 6 touchdowns, Spiller announced that he would be declaring for the 2022 NFL draft and skipping the 2021 Gator Bowl.

== Professional career ==
Pre-draft measurables
Height	Weight	Arm length	Hand span	Wingspan	40-yard dash	10-yard split	20-yard split	20-yard shuttle	Vertical jump	Broad jump
6 ft 0 3/8 in (1.84 m)	217 lb (98 kg)	31 3/4 in (0.81 m)	8 5/8 in (0.22 m)	6 ft 2 1/8 in (1.88 m)	4.64 s	1.59 s	2.65 s	4.27 s	33.0 in (0.84 m)	9 ft 6 in (2.90 m)
All values from NFL Combine/Pro Day

=== Los Angeles Chargers ===
Spiller was drafted by the Los Angeles Chargers in the fourth round, 123rd overall, of the 2022 NFL Draft.

On August 27, 2024, Spiller was waived by the Chargers and re-signed to the practice squad, but released days later.

=== Las Vegas Raiders ===
On December 18, 2024, Spiller was signed to the Las Vegas Raiders practice squad. He signed a reserve/future contract with the team on January 6, 2025. On April 25, Spiller was waived by the Raiders.

=== Dallas Renegades ===
On January 13, 2026, Spiller was selected by the Dallas Renegades in the 2026 UFL Draft.
