= Darian Kinnard =

American football player (born 1999)

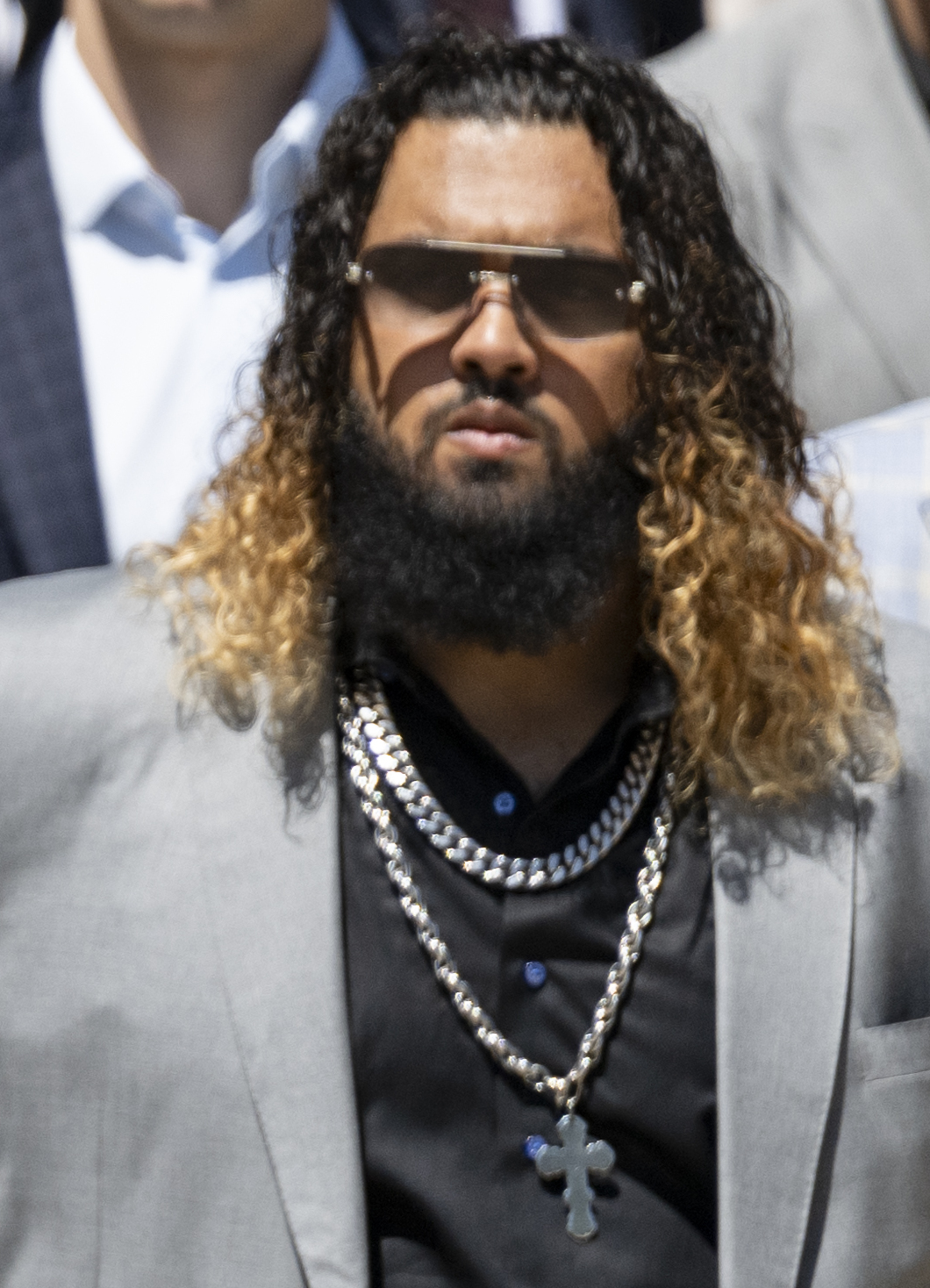
- Kinnard in 2025

Profile
- Position: Offensive tackle

Personal information
- Born: December 29, 1999 (age 26); Youngstown, Ohio, U.S.
- Listed height: 6 ft 5 in (1.96 m)
- Listed weight: 322 lb (146 kg)

Career information
- High school: Saint Ignatius (Cleveland, Ohio)
- College: Kentucky (2018–2021)
- NFL draft: 2022: 5th round, 145th overall pick

Career history
- Kansas City Chiefs (2022–2023); Philadelphia Eagles (2024); Green Bay Packers (2025); New York Giants (2026)*; Las Vegas Raiders (2026)*
- * Offseason or practice squad member only

Awards and highlights
- 3× Super Bowl champion (LVII, LVIII, LIX); Consensus All-American (2021); 2× First-team All-SEC (2020, 2021); Jacobs Blocking Trophy (2021)

Career NFL statistics as of 2025
- Games played: 20
- Games started: 5
- Stats at Pro Football Reference

Darian Kinnard (born December 29, 1999) is an American professional football offensive tackle. He played college football for the Kentucky Wildcats. Kinnard has previously played for the Green Bay Packers, Philadelphia Eagles, and Kansas City Chiefs.

Kinnard is notable as one of only two players (along with Ken Norton Jr.) to win three consecutive Super Bowls as a player, which he accomplished with wins in Super Bowls LVII, LVIII (as a member of the Kansas City Chiefs), and LIX (as a member of the Eagles).

Kinnard is related to country music legend Dolly Parton — his aunt Ginger is Parton's first cousin, and the two women grew up on the same street in Tennessee.

== Early life ==
Kinnard was born in Youngstown, Ohio, and grew up in Knoxville, Tennessee, and then Kingsport, Tennessee, where he attended Dobyns-Bennett High School. He moved to Cleveland, Ohio, after his freshman year and enrolled at Saint Ignatius High School. Kinnard played in the 2018 All-American Bowl. Kinnard committed to play college football at Kentucky over offers from Penn State, UCLA and Tennessee.

== College career ==
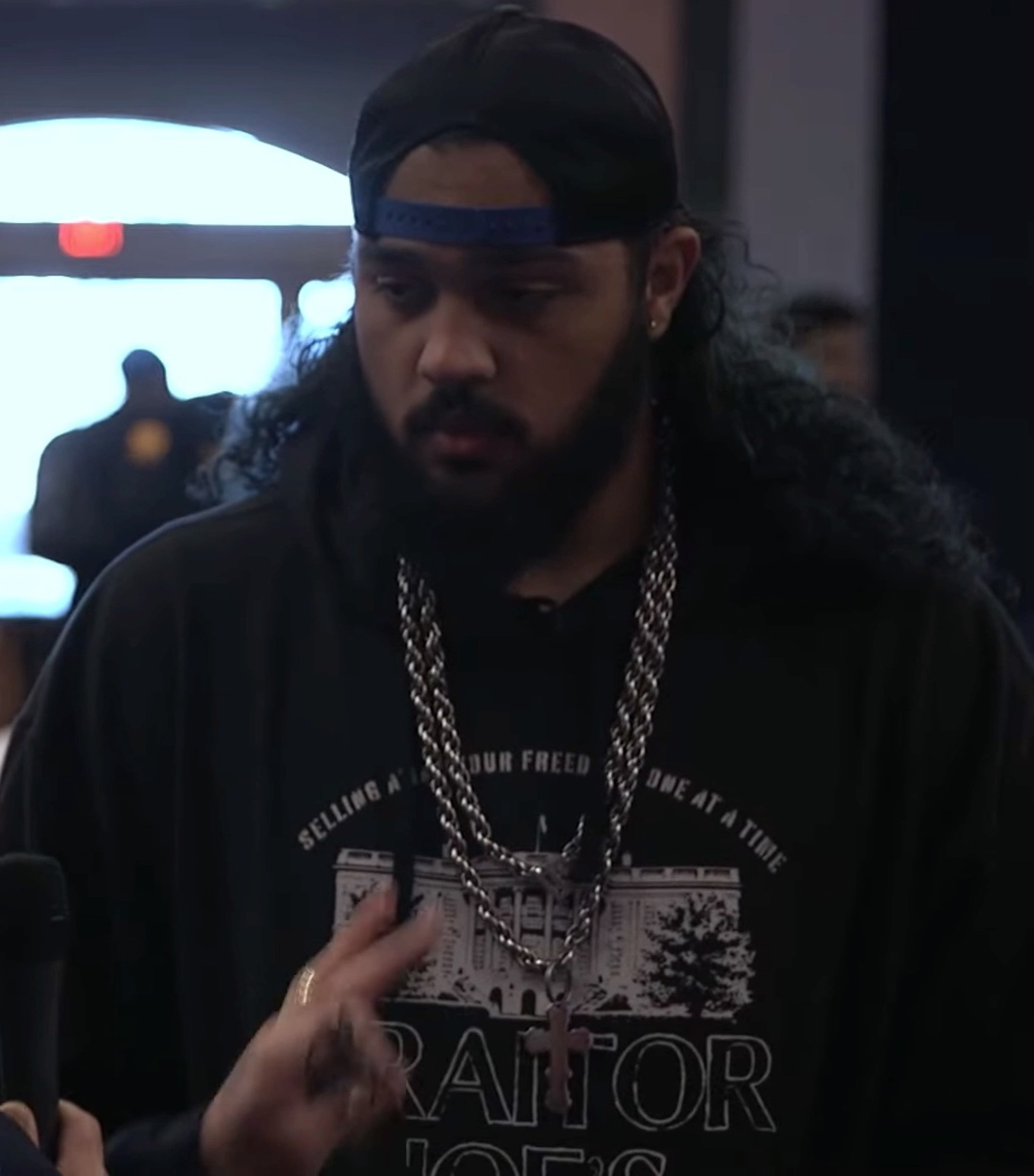
Kinnard in 2022

Kinnard played in nine games and started two games as a true freshman. He started all 13 of the Wildcats games at right tackle in his sophomore season. He was named preseason All-Southeastern Conference as well as a preseason All-American by CBS Sports going into his junior season. Overall, he played in 46 career games with 39 consecutive starts and was awarded the 2021 Jacobs Blocking Trophy.

== Professional career ==
Pre-draft measurables
Height	Weight	Arm length	Hand span	Wingspan	40-yard dash	10-yard split	20-yard split	20-yard shuttle	Three-cone drill	Vertical jump	Broad jump	Bench press
6 ft 5 3/8 in (1.97 m)	322 lb (146 kg)	35 in (0.89 m)	11 1/4 in (0.29 m)	6 ft 11 1/4 in (2.11 m)	5.31 s	1.82 s	3.03 s	4.96 s	8.11 s	25.0 in (0.64 m)	8 ft 3 in (2.51 m)	20 reps
All values from NFL Combine/Pro Day

=== Kansas City Chiefs ===
Kinnard was selected by the Kansas City Chiefs in the fifth round, 145th overall, of the 2022 NFL draft. Kinnard won Super Bowl LVII when the Chiefs defeated the Philadelphia Eagles.

On August 29, 2023, Kinnard was waived by the Chiefs and re-signed to the practice squad. Kinnard won his second straight Super Bowl when the Chiefs defeated the San Francisco 49ers in Super Bowl LVIII.

=== Philadelphia Eagles ===
On February 20, 2024, Kinnard signed with the Philadelphia Eagles. He made his first career start in the final week of the season against the Giants as the Eagles rested their usual starters in preparation for the playoffs. Kinnard won his third straight Super Bowl when the Eagles defeated the Kansas City Chiefs in Super Bowl LIX. He became the second player (after Ken Norton Jr.) in NFL history to win three consecutive Super Bowls as a player.

=== Green Bay Packers ===
On August 24, 2025, the Eagles traded Kinnard to the Green Bay Packers for a 2027 sixth-round pick. He appeared in all 17 games (starting four) for Green Bay during the regular season.

On March 10, 2026, Kinnard re-signed with the Packers. On August 30, he was released by Green Bay as a part of final roster cuts.

=== New York Giants ===
On September 1, 2026, Kinnard signed to the New York Giants' practice squad. Kinnard reunites with his former offensive coordinator, Matt Nagy. On October 2, Kinnard was released.

=== Las Vegas Raiders ===
On October 19, 2026, Kinnard was signed to the Las Vegas Raiders practice squad. On November 3, he was released.
