= Josh Jobe =

American football player (born 1998)

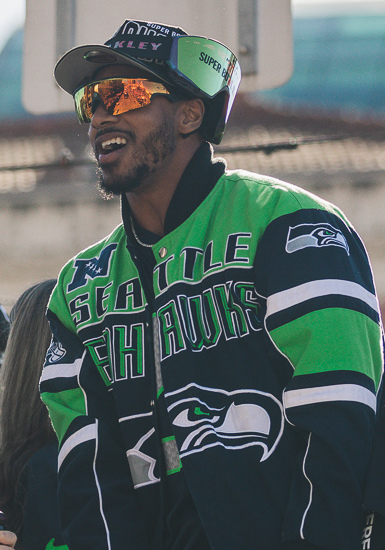
- Jobe at the Super Bowl LX parade

No. 29 – Seattle Seahawks
- Position: Cornerback
- Roster status: Active

Personal information
- Born: April 9, 1998 (age 28); Miami, Florida, U.S.
- Listed height: 5 ft 11 in (1.80 m)
- Listed weight: 190 lb (86 kg)

Career information
- High school: Cheshire Academy (Cheshire, Connecticut)
- College: Alabama (2018–2021)
- NFL draft: 2022: undrafted

Career history
- Philadelphia Eagles (2022–2023); Seattle Seahawks (2024–present)

Awards and highlights
- Super Bowl champion (LX); CFP national champion (2020)

Career NFL statistics as of Week 1, 2026
- Total tackles: 120
- Sacks: 0.5
- Forced fumbles: 1
- Pass deflections: 24
- Interceptions: 3
- Stats at Pro Football Reference

Joshua Jobe (born April 9, 1998) is an American professional football cornerback for the Seattle Seahawks of the National Football League (NFL). He played college football for the Alabama Crimson Tide, winning a national championship in 2020.

== Early life ==
Jobe grew up in Miami, Florida and attended Christopher Columbus High School. He was rated a four star recruit and initially committed to play college football at the University of Miami. Jobe transferred to Cheshire Academy in Cheshire, Connecticut before his senior year due being ruled too old to play high school in Florida. Jobe also re-opened his recruitment and ultimately flipped his commitment to Alabama in December 2017.

== College career ==
Jobe played in 14 games as a reserve defensive back as a true freshman, making eight total tackles. He played in 12 games with two starts, one of which was the 2020 Citrus Bowl, in his sophomore season and recorded 28 tackles, one interception and three passes broken up. Jobe was named a starter at cornerback going into his junior season.

=== College statistics ===
Alabama
Season	GP	Tackles					Interceptions					Fumbles		
Season	GP	Solo	Ast	Cmb	TfL	Sck	Int	Yds	Avg	TD	PD	FR	FF	TD
2018	4	7	1	8	0.0	0.0	0	0.0	0.0	0	1	0	0	0
2019	10	21	7	28	0.0	0.0	1	0.0	0.0	0	3	1	0	0
2020	13	39	16	55	2.5	2.0	0	0.0	0.0	0	11	0	2	0
2021	12	28	10	38	1.0	0.0	2	6.0	3.0	0	4	0	0	0
Career	39	95	34	129	3.5	2.0	3	6.0	2.0	0	19	1	2	0

== Professional career ==
Pre-draft measurables
Height	Weight	Arm length	Hand span	Wingspan
5 ft 11 1/2 in (1.82 m)	182 lb (83 kg)	32 5/8 in (0.83 m)	9 1/4 in (0.23 m)	6 ft 4 3/8 in (1.94 m)
All values from NFL Combine

=== Philadelphia Eagles ===
After going unselected in the 2022 NFL draft, Jobe was signed by the Philadelphia Eagles as an undrafted free agent on April 30. He was one of three 2022 undrafted players to make the Eagles' final roster, along with Josh Sills and Reed Blankenship.

Jobe was waived by the Eagles on August 27, 2024.

=== Seattle Seahawks ===
On August 29, 2024, the Seattle Seahawks signed Jobe to their practice squad. He was promoted to the active roster on November 11. In 10 games (6 starts) for Seattle, Jobe recorded 1 interception, 7 pass deflections, and 37 combined tackles.

On March 6, 2025, Jobe re-signed with the Seahawks. In Super Bowl LX, Jobe had seven total tackles in the game as the Seahawks defeated the New England Patriots 29–13.

On March 10, 2026, Jobe signed a three-year, $24 million contract extension with the Seahawks. In the opening game of the 2026 season against the New England Patriots, Jobe made a game-winning, toe-tapping interception against Drake Maye in the end zone, creating a touchback, with 21 seconds remaining in the fourth quarter, sealing a 13–10 win.

Nicknames

- Book of Jobe

== NFL career statistics ==
Legend
	Won the Super Bowl
**Bold**	Career High

=== Regular season ===
Year	Team	Games		Tackles						Interceptions						Fumbles				
Year	Team	GP	GS	Cmb	Solo	Ast	TFL	Sck	Sfty	PD	Int	Yds	Avg	Lng	TD	FF	FR	Yds	Avg	TD
2022	PHI	11	0	1	0	1	0	0.0	0	0	0	-	-	-	-	0	0	-	-	-
2023	PHI	17	3	22	20	2	0	0.0	0	4	0	-	-	-	-	**1**	0	-	-	-
2024	SEA	10	6	37	29	8	0	0.0	0	7	**1**	**33**	**33.0**	**33**	0	0	0	-	-	-
2025	SEA	16	15	**54**	**41**	**13**	0	**0.5**	0	**12**	**1**	0	0.0	0	0	0	0	-	-	-
2026	SEA	9	9	34	26	8	**1**	0.0	0	1	**1**	0	0.0	0	0	0	1			
Career		63	33	148	116	32	1	0.5	0	24	3	33	11.0	33	0	1	1	0	0.0	0

=== Postseason ===
Year	Team	Games		Tackles						Interceptions						Fumbles				
Year	Team	GP	GS	Cmb	Solo	Ast	TFL	Sck	Sfty	PD	Int	Yds	Avg	Lng	TD	FF	FR	Yds	Avg	TD
2022	PHI	3	0	1	1	0	0	0.0	0	0	0	0	0.0	0	0	0	0	-	-	-
2023	PHI	1	0	0	0	0	0	0.0	0	0	0	0	0.0	0	0	0	0	-	-	-
2025	SEA	3	3	**11**	**9**	**2**	**1**	0.0	0	**1**	0	0	0.0	0	0	**1**	0	-	-	-
Career		7	3	12	10	2	1	0.0	0	1	0	0	0.0	0	0	1	0	0	0	0
