= Phidarian Mathis =

American football player (born 1998)

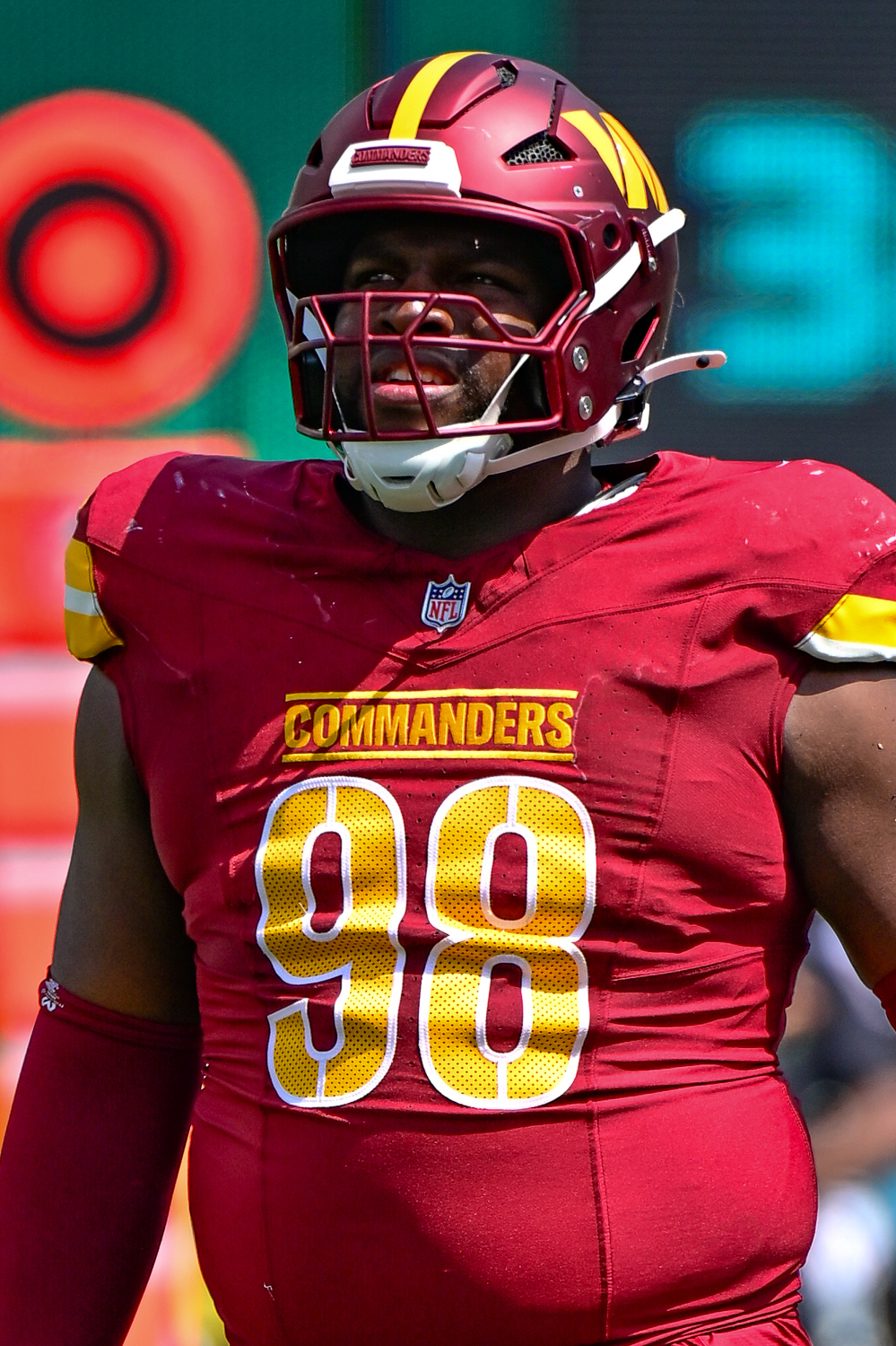
- Mathis with the Washington Commanders in 2024

No. 72 – Buffalo Bills
- Position: Defensive tackle
- Roster status: Practice squad

Personal information
- Born: April 26, 1998 (age 28); Wisner, Louisiana, U.S.
- Listed height: 6 ft 4 in (1.93 m)
- Listed weight: 312 lb (142 kg)

Career information
- High school: Neville (Monroe, Louisiana)
- College: Alabama (2017–2021)
- NFL draft: 2022: 2nd round, 47th overall pick

Career history
- Washington Commanders (2022–2024); New York Jets (2024); Buffalo Bills (2025–present)

Awards and highlights
- CFP national champion (2020); Second-team All-SEC (2021)

Career NFL statistics as of 2025
- Total tackles: 38
- Fumble recoveries: 1
- Pass deflections: 1
- Stats at Pro Football Reference

Phidarian "Phil" Mathis (born April 26, 1998) is an American professional football defensive tackle for the Buffalo Bills of the National Football League (NFL). He played college football for the Alabama Crimson Tide and was selected by the Washington Commanders in the second round of the 2022 NFL draft.

== Early life ==
Mathis was born on April 26, 1998, in Wisner, Louisiana. He attended Franklin Parish High School prior to moving after his sophomore year to Monroe, Louisiana, where he enrolled at Neville High School. As a senior, he had 41 tackles and seven sacks. Mathis was rated a four-star recruit and committed to play college football at Alabama over offers from LSU and TCU.

== College career ==
Mathis redshirted his freshman season at Alabama. He played in all 15 of the Crimson Tide's games as a redshirt freshman and was named to the Southeastern Conference (SEC) All-Freshman team. Mathis had 31 tackles, five tackles for loss and 1.5 sacks with a forced fumble as the Crimson Tide won the 2021 College Football Playoff National Championship. Mathis declared for the 2022 NFL draft following the season.

== Professional career ==
Pre-draft measurables
Height	Weight	Arm length	Hand span	Wingspan	20-yard shuttle	Vertical jump	Broad jump
6 ft 4 1/4 in (1.94 m)	310 lb (141 kg)	34 5/8 in (0.88 m)	10 3/8 in (0.26 m)	6 ft 11 7/8 in (2.13 m)	4.91 s	23.5 in (0.60 m)	9 ft 1 in (2.77 m)
All values from NFL Combine

=== Washington Commanders ===
Mathis was selected by the Washington Commanders in the second round (47th overall) of the 2022 NFL Draft. He signed his four-year rookie contract on June 21, 2022. In his NFL debut, Mathis tore the meniscus in his left knee and was placed on injured reserve.

On August 31, 2023, Mathis was placed on injured reserve due to a calf injury. He was activated on October 28.

Mathis made 12 appearances for Washington in 2024, recording one pass deflection and 17 tackles, prior to being waived on December 28, 2024.

=== New York Jets ===
On December 30, 2024, the New York Jets claimed Mathis off waivers.

On August 21, 2025, Mathis was released by the Jets.

=== Buffalo Bills ===
On September 10, 2025, Mathis signed with the Buffalo Bills' practice squad. After being elevated twice, Mathis was signed to the active roster on November 5.

On February 23, 2026, Mathis re-signed with the Bills on a one-year contract. On August 14, Mathis was suspended three games for violating the league's substance abuse policy. He was released on September 29, and re-signed to the practice squad.

== Personal life ==
Mathis goes by the nickname of Phil.
