= Jerrion Ealy =

American football player (born 2000)

Profile
- Positions: Running back, wide receiver

Personal information
- Born: August 19, 2000 (age 26); Walnut Grove, Mississippi, U.S.
- Listed height: 5 ft 8 in (1.73 m)
- Listed weight: 187 lb (85 kg)

Career information
- High school: Jackson Prep (Flowood, Mississippi)
- College: Ole Miss (2019–2021)
- NFL draft: 2022: undrafted

Career history
- Kansas City Chiefs (2022–2023)*
- * Offseason or practice squad member only

Awards and highlights
- Super Bowl champion (LVII); 3× Second-team All-SEC (2019–2021)
- Stats at Pro Football Reference

Jerrion Zawasky Ealy (born August 19, 2000) is an American former professional football wide receiver and running back. He played college football at Ole Miss, and was signed to the Kansas City Chiefs after going unselected in the 2022 NFL draft.

== Early life ==
Ealy attended Jackson Preparatory School in Flowood, Mississippi. During his career, he rushed for over 5,000 yards with 84 touchdowns. He was the MVP of the 2019 Under Armour All-American Game after rushing for a game record 116 yards and two touchdowns. A five-star recruit, Ealy committed to play college football and college baseball at the University of Mississippi (Ole Miss).

Also a top baseball recruit, Ealy played in the 2018 Under Armour All-America Baseball Game. He was drafted by the Arizona Diamondbacks in the 31st round of the 2019 Major League Baseball draft, but did not sign and attended Ole Miss.

== College career ==
As a true freshman in football at Ole Miss in 2019, Ealy played in all 12 games. Against Southeastern Louisiana University, he set a school record for all-purpose yards (273) in a game. Overall, he rushed for 722 yards over 104 carries with eight total touchdowns. As a freshman baseball player in 2020, Ealy played in 13 games before the season was suspended due to the COVID-19 pandemic.

== Professional career ==
Pre-draft measurables
Height	Weight	Arm length	Hand span	Wingspan	40-yard dash	10-yard split	20-yard split	20-yard shuttle	Three-cone drill	Vertical jump	Broad jump	Bench press
5 ft 8 1/8 in (1.73 m)	189 lb (86 kg)	29 1/8 in (0.74 m)	8 1/2 in (0.22 m)	6 ft 0 1/4 in (1.84 m)	4.52 s	1.55 s	2.60 s	4.35 s	7.07 s	34.5 in (0.88 m)	10 ft 8 in (3.25 m)	15 reps
All values from NFL Combine/Pro Day

=== Kansas City Chiefs ===
Ealy was signed by the Kansas City Chiefs as an undrafted free agent following the 2022 NFL draft. On August 30, 2022, he was waived by the Chiefs and re-signed to the practice squad the following day. On October 3, he was suspended for six games for a PED violation. On January 12, 2023, Ealy was released by the Chiefs following the signing of Phil Hoskins. Five days later, Ealy was re–signed to fill the vacancy created by the release of Daniel Wise. He was waived once more on January 28 after the team signed La'Mical Perine, and re–signed to the practice squad two days later. Ealy won his first Super Bowl ring when the Chiefs defeated the Philadelphia Eagles in Super Bowl LVII. He signed a reserve/future contract on February 15.

On August 29, 2023, Ealy was waived by the Chiefs as part of final roster cuts.
