= DeMarvin Leal =

American football player (born 2000)

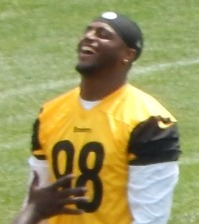
- Leal with the Pittsburgh Steelers in 2023

Profile
- Position: Defensive end

Personal information
- Born: July 1, 2000 (age 26); San Antonio, Texas, U.S.
- Listed height: 6 ft 4 in (1.93 m)
- Listed weight: 290 lb (132 kg)

Career information
- High school: Judson (Converse, Texas)
- College: Texas A&M (2019–2021)
- NFL draft: 2022: 3rd round, 84th overall pick

Career history
- Pittsburgh Steelers (2022–2025); New York Giants (2026)*
- * Offseason or practice squad member only

Awards and highlights
- Consensus All-American (2021); First-team All-SEC (2021)

Career NFL statistics as of 2025
- Total tackles: 35
- Sacks: 1
- Pass deflections: 4
- Stats at Pro Football Reference

DeMarvin Leal (born July 1, 2000) is an American professional football defensive end. He played college football for the Texas A&M Aggies. He was named a consensus All-American as a junior in 2021.

== Early life ==
Leal attended Judson High School in Converse, Texas. He played in the 2019 U.S. Army All-American Game. He committed to Texas A&M University to play college football.

== College career ==
As a true freshman at Texas A&M in 2019, Leal played in all 13 games and had seven starts. He recorded 38 tackles and two sacks. He returned as a starter his sophomore year in 2020. He started all nine games, recording 37 tackles, 2.5 sacks, and an interception.

During the 2021 season, he was named a midseason All-American by the Sporting News, Associated Press, and The Athletic. Leal completed the season with 58 tackles, 12.5 tackles for loss and eight sacks, and was named a consensus All-American. Leal decided to forgo his final year of eligibility and enter the 2022 NFL draft.

=== Statistics ===
| Season | GP | Defense | | | | |
| Season | GP | Tckl | TFL | Sck | Int | FF |
|---|---|---|---|---|---|---|
| 2019 | 12 | 38 | 5.5 | 2.0 | 0 | 0 |
| 2020 | 10 | 37 | 7.0 | 2.5 | 1 | 1 |
| 2021 | 11 | 58 | 12.5 | 8.5 | 0 | 1 |
| Career | 33 | 133 | 25.0 | 13.0 | 1 | 2 |

== Professional career ==
Pre-draft measurables
| Height | Weight | Arm length | Hand span | Wingspan | 40-yard dash | 10-yard split | 20-yard split | 20-yard shuttle | Three-cone drill | Vertical jump | Broad jump | Bench press |
|---|---|---|---|---|---|---|---|---|---|---|---|---|
| 6 ft 3 7/8 in (1.93 m) | 283 lb (128 kg) | 33 1/4 in (0.84 m) | 9 1/2 in (0.24 m) | 6 ft 8 3/8 in (2.04 m) | 5.00 s | 1.72 s | 2.90 s | 4.49 s | 7.20 s | 30.5 in (0.77 m) | 9 ft 2 in (2.79 m) | 17 reps |
All values from NFL Combine/Pro Day

=== Pittsburgh Steelers ===
Leal was selected by the Pittsburgh Steelers in the third round, 84th overall, of the 2022 NFL draft. He made his NFL debut in Week 1 against the Cincinnati Bengals. He recorded his first start in Week 5 against the Buffalo Bills. He was placed on injured reserve on October 15, 2022. He returned in Week 13. He finished his rookie season with two starts in 11 appearances. He had 14 total tackles and three passes defensed.

On August 26, 2025, Leal was waived by the Steelers as part of final roster cuts, and re-signed to the practice squad. He was promoted to the active roster on September 17. On November 6, Leal was waived and re-signed to the practice squad two days later. He was released on January 12, 2026.

=== New York Giants ===
On January 22, 2026, Leal signed a reserve/futures contract with the New York Giants. He was released by the Giants on April 27.
