= Kenyon Green =

American football player (born 2001)

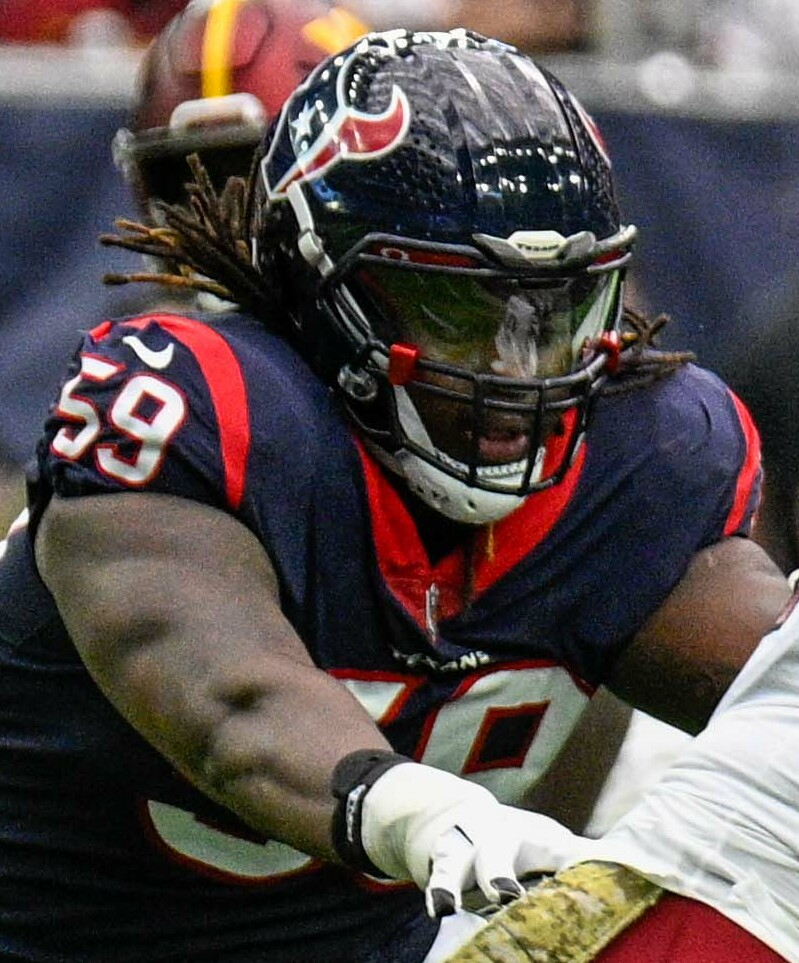
- Green with the Houston Texans in 2022

Profile
- Position: Guard

Personal information
- Born: March 15, 2001 (age 25); Humble, Texas, U.S.
- Listed height: 6 ft 4 in (1.93 m)
- Listed weight: 323 lb (147 kg)

Career information
- High school: Atascocita (Humble)
- College: Texas A&M (2019–2021)
- NFL draft: 2022: 1st round, 15th overall pick

Career history
- Houston Texans (2022–2024); Philadelphia Eagles (2025); Baltimore Ravens (2025)*
- * Offseason or practice squad member only

Awards and highlights
- 2× Consensus All-American (2020, 2021); First-team All-SEC (2021); Second-team All-SEC (2020)

Career NFL statistics as of 2025
- Games played: 27
- Games started: 23
- Stats at Pro Football Reference

Kenyon Green (born March 15, 2001) is an American professional football guard. He played college football for the Texas A&M Aggies, where he was a two-time consensus All-American. Green was selected by the Houston Texans in the first round of the 2022 NFL draft.

== Early life ==
Green grew up in Humble, Texas and attended Atascocita High School. Green was rated a five-star recruit and originally committed to play college football at LSU during his sophomore year before decommitting as a junior and choosing to enroll at Texas A&M.

== College career ==
Green was named Texas A&M's starting right guard going into his freshman season. He started all 13 of the team's games and was named to the Southeastern Conference All-Freshman Team. As a sophomore, Green moved to left guard and started all nine of the Aggies games and was named a first-team All-American by Sporting News and the Football Writers Association of America and was a second-team selection by the Associated Press, the American Football Coaches Association, and the Walter Camp Foundation, tying him with BYU's Brady Christensen for a consensus All-American selection. He moved to offensive tackle for the 2021 season.

As a junior, Green received first-team All-America honors from Sporting News, the Associated Press, CBS Sports, and USA Today. He was named a second-team All-American by the Walter Camp Football Foundation, The Athletic, the American Football Coaches Association, and the Football Writers Association of America. He was also a finalist for the Lombardi Award, which was ultimately awarded to Michigan's Aidan Hutchinson.

Green decided to forgo his final year of eligibility to enter the 2022 NFL draft.

== Professional career ==
Pre-draft measurables
Height	Weight	Arm length	Hand span	Wingspan	40-yard dash	10-yard split	20-yard split	20-yard shuttle	Vertical jump	Broad jump	Bench press
6 ft 3 7/8 in (1.93 m)	323 lb (147 kg)	34 1/8 in (0.87 m)	10 3/8 in (0.26 m)	6 ft 11 3/8 in (2.12 m)	5.24 s	1.76 s	3.01 s	5.03 s	28.5 in (0.72 m)	8 ft 6 in (2.59 m)	20 reps
All values from NFL Combine/Pro Day

=== Houston Texans ===
Green was selected with the 15th overall pick by the Houston Texans in the 2022 NFL Draft. As a rookie, he appeared in 15 games and started 14. Green achieved a PFF grade of 37.7, which positioned him at the 77th spot out of 77 graded guards. His performance included allowing 47 quarterback pressures, including four sacks and 12 quarterback hits. Furthermore, he committed 12 penalties, tying for the second-highest count in the league.

On August 29, 2023, Green was placed on injured reserve after suffering a shoulder injury in the final preseason game. He was activated on December 20.

=== Philadelphia Eagles ===
On March 12, 2025, Green and a 2025 fifth-round draft pick were traded to the Philadelphia Eagles in exchange for safety C. J. Gardner-Johnson and a 2026 sixth-round draft pick. He was waived on August 25 and re-signed to the practice squad two days later. On August 31, Green was signed to the active roster. On September 6, he was waived by the Eagles. On September 17, Green again re-signed with Philadelphia, but was waived on September 23.

=== Baltimore Ravens ===
On September 30, 2025, Green signed with the Baltimore Ravens' practice squad.
