= 2021 Arkansas Razorbacks football team =

American college football season

2021 Arkansas Razorbacks football

Outback Bowl champion

Outback Bowl, W 24–10 vs. Penn State
- Conference: Southeastern Conference
- Western Division

Ranking
- Coaches: No. 20
- AP: No. 21
- Record: 9–4 (4–4 SEC)
- Head coach: Sam Pittman (2nd season)
- Offensive coordinator: Kendal Briles (2nd season)
- Offensive scheme: Hurry-up, no-huddle spread
- Defensive coordinator: Barry Odom (2nd season)
- Base defense: 3–2–6
- Captains: Jalen Catalon; Myron Cunningham; Joe Foucha; KJ Jefferson; Grant Morgan
- Home stadium: Donald W. Reynolds Razorback Stadium; War Memorial Stadium

2021 Southeastern Conference football standings
| | Conf. | | | Overall |
| Team | W | | L | W | | L |
|---|---|---|---|---|---|---|
Eastern Division
| No. 1 Georgia x#^ | 8 | – | 0 | 14 | – | 1 |
| No. 18 Kentucky* | 5 | – | 3 | 10 | – | 3 |
| Tennessee | 4 | – | 4 | 7 | – | 6 |
| Missouri | 3 | – | 5 | 6 | – | 7 |
| South Carolina | 3 | – | 5 | 7 | – | 6 |
| Florida | 2 | – | 6 | 6 | – | 7 |
| Vanderbilt | 0 | – | 8 | 2 | – | 10 |
Western Division
| No. 2 Alabama x$^ | 7 | – | 1 | 13 | – | 2 |
| No. 11 Ole Miss | 6 | – | 2 | 10 | – | 3 |
| No. 21 Arkansas | 4 | – | 4 | 9 | – | 4 |
| Mississippi State | 4 | – | 4 | 7 | – | 6 |
| Texas A&M | 4 | – | 4 | 8 | – | 4 |
| Auburn | 3 | – | 5 | 6 | – | 7 |
| LSU | 3 | – | 5 | 6 | – | 7 |
Championship: Alabama 41, Georgia 24
# – College Football Playoff champion; ^ – College Football Playoff participant; $ – Conference champion; x – Division champion/co-champions; * – Kentucky vacated all wins due to NCAA violations.; Rankings from AP Poll

The 2021 Arkansas Razorbacks football team represented the University of Arkansas as a member of the Southeastern Conference (SEC) during the 2021 NCAA Division I FBS football season. Led by second-year head coach Sam Pittman, the Razorbacks compiled an overall record of 9–4 with a mark of 4–4 in conference play, placing in a three-way tie for third in the SEC's Western Division. Arkansas was invited to the Outback Bowl, where the Razorbacks defeated Penn State. The team played home games at Donald W. Reynolds Razorback Stadium in Fayetteville, Arkansas. The team played six home games at Donald W. Reynolds Razorback Stadium in Fayetteville, Arkansas and one home game at War Memorial Stadium in Little Rock, Arkansas.

The win over Penn State was Arkansas' first bowl game victory on New Year's Day since beating the Texas Longhorns in the 2000 Cotton Bowl Classic. The bowl win was also Arkansas' first over a Big Ten Conference opponent. Arkansas' victory over Texas on September 11 was the Razorbacks first win over the Longhorns in Fayetteville since 1981. For the first time in program history, the Razorbacks won all three rivalry trophy games in the same season, beating Texas A&M in Arlington, Texas for the Southwest Classic Trophy, LSU to win the Golden Boot, and Missouri to win the Battle Line Trophy. Arkansas also ended losing streaks of nine games versus Texas A&M, five games versus LSU, and five games versus Missouri.

== Schedule ==
The Razorbacks' 2021 schedule was released on January 27, 2021, and consisted of seven home games, four away games, and one neutral site game in the regular season.

| Date | Time | Opponent | Rank | Site | TV | Result | Attendance |
|---|---|---|---|---|---|---|---|
| September 4 | 1:00 p.m. | Rice* | | Donald W. Reynolds Razorback Stadium; Fayetteville, AR | ESPN+, SECN+ | W 38–17 | 64,065 |
| September 11 | 6:00 p.m. | No. 15 Texas* | | Donald W. Reynolds Razorback Stadium; Fayetteville, AR (rivalry, SEC Nation) | ESPN | W 40–21 | 74,531 |
| September 18 | 3:00 p.m. | Georgia Southern* | No. 20 | Donald W. Reynolds Razorback Stadium; Fayetteville, AR | SECN | W 45–10 | 66,311 |
| September 25 | 2:30 p.m. | vs. No. 7 Texas A&M | No. 16 | AT&T Stadium; Arlington, TX (rivalry) | CBS | W 20–10 | 57,992 |
| October 2 | 11:00 a.m. | at No. 2 Georgia | No. 8 | Sanford Stadium; Athens, GA (College GameDay) | ESPN | L 0–37 | 92,746 |
| October 9 | 11:00 a.m. | at No. 17 Ole Miss | No. 13 | Vaught–Hemingway Stadium; Oxford, MS (rivalry) | ESPN | L 51–52 | 60,256 |
| October 16 | 11:00 a.m. | Auburn^{†} | No. 17 | Donald W. Reynolds Razorback Stadium; Fayetteville, AR | CBS | L 23–38 | 73,370 |
| October 23 | 11:00 a.m. | Arkansas–Pine Bluff* | | War Memorial Stadium; Little Rock, AR | SECN | W 45–3 | 42,576 |
| November 6 | 3:00 p.m. | No. 17 Mississippi State | | Donald W. Reynolds Razorback Stadium; Fayetteville, AR | SECN | W 31–28 | 68,818 |
| November 13 | 6:30 p.m. | at LSU | No. 25 | Tiger Stadium; Baton Rouge, LA (rivalry) | SECN | W 16–13^{OT} | 98,772 |
| November 20 | 2:30 p.m. | at No. 2 Alabama | No. 21 | Bryant–Denny Stadium; Tuscaloosa, AL (SEC Nation) | CBS | L 35–42 | 98,323 |
| November 26 | 2:30 p.m. | Missouri | No. 25 | Donald W. Reynolds Razorback Stadium; Fayetteville, AR (Battle Line Rivalry) | CBS | W 34–17 | 67,320 |
| January 1, 2022 | 11:00 a.m. | vs. Penn State* | No. 21 | Raymond James Stadium; Tampa, FL (Outback Bowl) | ESPN2 | W 24–10 | 46,577 |
*Non-conference game; ^{†}Homecoming; Rankings from AP Poll (and CFP Rankings, after November 2) – Released prior to game; All times are in Central time

== Rankings ==
Ranking movements Legend: ██ Increase in ranking ██ Decrease in ranking — = Not ranked RV = Received votes
| | Week | | | | | | | | | | | | | | | |
| Poll | Pre | 1 | 2 | 3 | 4 | 5 | 6 | 7 | 8 | 9 | 10 | 11 | 12 | 13 | 14 | Final |
|---|---|---|---|---|---|---|---|---|---|---|---|---|---|---|---|---|
| AP | — | — | 20 | 16 | 8 | 13 | 17 | RV | RV | RV | RV | 21 | 25 | 23 | 22 | 21 |
| Coaches | RV | RV | 24 | 18 | 11 | 16 | 19 | RV | RV | RV | RV | 22 | RV | 25 | 24 | 20 |
| CFP | Not released | | | | | | | | | — | 25 | 21 | 25 | 22 | 21 | Not released |

== Preseason ==
=== SEC Media Days ===
The 2021 SEC Media Days were held July 19–22, 2021, at the Hyatt Regency Birmingham – The Wynfrey Hotel in Hoover, Alabama. The preseason polls were released on July 23, 2021. Arkansas placed sixth in the West Division in the preseason media poll, and five Arkansas players were selected to the all-SEC media teams.

==== Preseason all-SEC teams ====
Offense

1st team

Treylon Burks – WR

2nd team

Ricky Stromberg – C

3rd team

Myron Cunningham – OL

Defense

2nd team

Grant Morgan – LB

Jalen Catalon – DB

== Game summaries ==
=== Rice ===
Game One – Rice Owls (0–0) at Arkansas Razorbacks (0–0)

| Quarter | 1 | 2 | 3 | 4 | Total |
|---|---|---|---|---|---|
| Owls | 0 | 10 | 7 | 0 | 17 |
| Razorbacks | 7 | 0 | 10 | 21 | 38 |

at Donald W. Reynolds Razorback Stadium • Fayetteville, Arkansas

- Date: Saturday, September 4, 2021
- Game time: 1:00 p.m. CST
- Game weather: Partly cloudy • Temperature: 89 °F (32 °C) • Wind: NE 12 mph
- Referee: Lee Hedrick
- TV announcers (SEC Network+): Mike Couzens (play-by-play), Dustin Fox (analyst), and Tera Talmadge (sideline)
- ESPN

Game information

First quarter

- (8:23) Arkansas – KJ Jefferson 34 yard rush, Cam Little kick (Drive: 8 plays, 80 yards, 2:32; Arkansas 7–0)

Second quarter

- (11:55) Rice – Collin Riccitelli 25 yard field goal (Drive: 6 plays, 14 yards, 2:59; Arkansas 7–3)
- (4:19) Rice – Jordan Myers 1 yard rush, Collin Riccitelli kick (Drive: 8 plays, 41 yards, 2:21; Rice 10–7)

Third quarter

- (10:28) Rice – August Pitre III 41 yard pass from Wiley Green, Collin Riccitelli kick (Drive: 2 plays, 56 yards, 0:48; Rice 17–7)
- (8:11) Arkansas – KJ Jefferson 5 yard rush, Cam Little kick (Drive: 6 plays, 57 yards, 2:10; Rice 17–14)
- (0:18) Arkansas – Cam Little 34 yard field goal (Drive: 11 plays, 65 yards, 4:24; Tied 17–17)

Fourth quarter

- (12:44) Arkansas – Trelon Smith 2 yard rush, Cam Little kick (Drive: 3 plays, 9 yards, 1:07; Arkansas 24–17)
- (4:07) Arkansas – Tyson Morris 9 yard pass from KJ Jefferson, Cam Little kick (Drive: 3 plays, 40 yards, 1:47; Arkansas 31–17)
- (0:58) Arkansas – Dominique Johnson 3 yard rush, Cam Little kick (Drive: 4 plays, 16 yards, 1:39; Arkansas 38–17)

| Statistics | RICE | ARK |
|---|---|---|
| First downs | 21 | 18 |
| Plays–yards | 74–308 | 64–335 |
| Rushes–yards | 39–81 | 43–207 |
| Passing yards | 227 | 128 |
| Passing: comp–att–int | 17–35–3 | 12–21–1 |
| Time of possession | 31:00 | 25:00 |

| Team | Category | Player | Statistics |
|---|---|---|---|
| Rice | Passing | Wiley Green | 12/25, 152 yards, 1 TD, 3 INT |
| Rice | Rushing | Khalan Griffin | 13 carries, 35 yards |
| Rice | Receiving | August Pitre III | 4 receptions, 97 yards, 1 TD |
| Arkansas | Passing | KJ Jefferson | 12/21, 128 yards, 1 TD, 1 INT |
| Arkansas | Rushing | Trelon Smith | 22 carries, 102 yards, 1 TD |
| Arkansas | Receiving | Treylon Burks | 5 receptions, 42 yards |

=== No. 15 Texas ===
Game Two – No. 15 Texas Longhorns (1–0) at Arkansas Razorbacks (1–0)

| Quarter | 1 | 2 | 3 | 4 | Total |
|---|---|---|---|---|---|
| No. 15 Longhorns | 0 | 0 | 7 | 14 | 21 |
| Razorbacks | 3 | 13 | 17 | 7 | 40 |

at Donald W. Reynolds Razorback Stadium • Fayetteville, Arkansas

- Date: Saturday, September 11, 2021
- Game time: 6:00 p.m. CST
- Game weather: Clear • Temperature: 85 °F (29 °C) • Wind: S 8 mph
- Referee: Brandon Cruse
- TV announcers (ESPN): Joe Tessitore (play-by-play), Greg McElroy (analyst), and Katie George (sideline)
- ESPN

Game information

First quarter

- (2:03) Arkansas – Cam Little 24 yard field goal (Drive: 12 plays, 57 yards, 5:29; Arkansas 3–0)

Second quarter

- (10:55) Arkansas – Dominique Johnson 5 yard rush, Cam Little kick (Drive: 7 plays, 66 yards, 2:48; Arkansas 10–0)
- (7:34) Arkansas – Cam Little 24 yard field goal (Drive: 4 plays, 8 yards, 1:15; Arkansas 13–0)
- (3:00) Arkansas – Cam Little 44 yard field goal (Drive: 7 plays, 53 yards, 3:02; Arkansas 16–0)

Third quarter

- (10:17) Texas – Bijan Robinson 1 yard rush, Cameron Dicker kick (Drive: 6 plays, 26 yards, 2:31; Arkansas 16–7)
- (8:16) Arkansas – Trelon Smith 1 yard rush, Cam Little kick (Drive: 6 plays, 81 yards, 1:56; Arkansas 23–7)
- (2:08) Arkansas – Cam Little 22 yard field goal (Drive: 10 plays, 38 yards, 4:05; Arkansas 26–7)
- (1:50) Arkansas – Raheim Sanders 26 yard rush, Cam Little kick (Drive: 1 play, 26 yards, 0:10; Arkansas 33–7)

Fourth quarter

- (13:33) Texas – Casey Thompson 5 yard rush, Cameron Dicker kick (Drive: 10 plays, 75 yards, 3:17; Arkansas 33–14)
- (8:27) Arkansas – AJ Green 30 yard rush, Cam Little kick (Drive: 8 plays, 75 yards, 5:06; Arkansas 40–14)
- (4:57) Texas – Casey Thompson 2 yard rush, Cameron Dicker kick (Drive: 14 plays, 75 yards, 6:01; Arkansas 40–21)

| Statistics | TEX | ARK |
|---|---|---|
| First downs | 15 | 20 |
| Plays–yards | 64–256 | 66–471 |
| Rushes–yards | 41–138 | 47–333 |
| Passing yards | 118 | 138 |
| Passing: comp–att–int | 13–23–0 | 14–19–1 |
| Time of possession | 29:00 | 31:00 |

| Team | Category | Player | Statistics |
|---|---|---|---|
| Texas | Passing | Hudson Card | 8/15, 61 yards |
| Texas | Rushing | Bijan Robinson | 19 carries, 69 yards, 1 TD |
| Texas | Receiving | Xavier Worthy | 2 receptions, 41 yards |
| Arkansas | Passing | KJ Jefferson | 14/19, 138 yards, 1 INT |
| Arkansas | Rushing | Trelon Smith | 12 carries, 75 yards, 1 TD |
| Arkansas | Receiving | Tyson Morris | 1 reception, 45 yards |

=== Georgia Southern ===
Game Three – Georgia Southern Eagles (1–1) at No. 20 Arkansas Razorbacks (2–0)

| Quarter | 1 | 2 | 3 | 4 | Total |
|---|---|---|---|---|---|
| Eagles | 0 | 10 | 0 | 0 | 10 |
| No. 20 Razorbacks | 14 | 10 | 14 | 7 | 45 |

at Donald W. Reynolds Razorback Stadium • Fayetteville, Arkansas

- Date: Saturday, September 18, 2021
- Game time: 3:00 p.m. CST
- Game weather: Fair • Temperature: 89 °F (32 °C) • Wind: SW 8 mph
- Referee: Matt Loeffler
- TV announcers (SEC Network): Dave Neal (play-by-play), Deuce McAllister (analyst), Andraya Carter (sideline)
- ESPN

Game information

First quarter

- (12:07) Arkansas – Trelon Smith 13 yard rush, Cam Little kick (Drive: 4 plays, 73 yards, 1:12; Arkansas 7–0)
- (3:31) Arkansas – Dominique Johnson 11 yard rush, Cam Little kick (Drive: 15 plays, 94 yards, 6:30; Arkansas 14–0)

Second quarter

- (8:42) Arkansas – Tyson Morris 14 yard pass from KJ Jefferson, Cam Little kick (Drive: 7 plays, 99 yards, 1:56; Arkansas 21–0)
- (7:22) Georgia Southern – Justin Tomlin 76 yard rush, Alex Raynor kick (Drive: 3 plays, 75 yards, 1:20; Arkansas 21–7)
- (2:23) Arkansas – Cam Little 25 yard field goal (Drive: 7 plays, 73 yards, 2:48; Arkansas 24–7)
- (0:00) Georgia Southern – Alex Raynor 32 yard field goal (Drive: 12 plays, 60 yards, 2:23; Arkansas 24–10)

Third quarter

- (13:26) Arkansas – Warren Thompson 60 yard pass from KJ Jefferson, Cam Little kick (Drive: 4 plays, 80 yards, 1:27; Arkansas 31–10)
- (11:18) Arkansas – Treylon Burks 91 yard pass from KJ Jefferson, Cam Little kick (Drive: 1 play, 91 yards, 0:14; Arkansas 38–10)

Fourth quarter

- (8:22) Arkansas – Malik Hornsby 6 yard rush, Cam Little kick (Drive: 12 plays, 66 yards, 7:01; Arkansas 45–10)

| Statistics | GASO | ARK |
|---|---|---|
| First downs | 11 | 28 |
| Plays–yards | 63–233 | 73–633 |
| Rushes–yards | 35–152 | 48–269 |
| Passing yards | 81 | 364 |
| Passing: comp–att–int | 13–28–0 | 14–25–0 |
| Time of possession | 27:00 | 33:00 |

| Team | Category | Player | Statistics |
|---|---|---|---|
| Georgia Southern | Passing | Justin Tomlin | 11/23, 65 yards |
| Georgia Southern | Rushing | Justin Tomlin | 10 carries, 65 yards, 1 TD |
| Georgia Southern | Receiving | Khaleb Hood | 6 receptions, 42 yards |
| Arkansas | Passing | KJ Jefferson | 13/23, 366 yards, 3 TD |
| Arkansas | Rushing | Dominique Johnson | 5 carries, 72 yards, 1 TD |
| Arkansas | Receiving | Treylon Burks | 3 receptions, 127 yards, 1 TD |

=== Vs. No. 7 Texas A&M ===
Game Four – No. 7 Texas A&M Aggies (3–0) vs. No. 16 Arkansas Razorbacks (3–0)

| Quarter | 1 | 2 | 3 | 4 | Total |
|---|---|---|---|---|---|
| No. 7 Aggies | 0 | 3 | 7 | 0 | 10 |
| No. 16 Razorbacks | 10 | 7 | 0 | 3 | 20 |

at AT&T Stadium • Arlington, Texas

- Date: Saturday, September 25, 2021
- Game time: 2:30 p.m. CST
- Game weather: n/a (game played indoors)
- Referee: Steve Marlowe
- TV announcers (CBS): Brad Nessler (play-by-play), Gary Danielson (analyst), Jamie Erdahl (sideline)
- ESPN

Game information

First quarter

- (8:20) Arkansas – Cam Little 46 yard field goal (Drive: 8 plays, 57 yards, 3:17; Arkansas 3–0)
- (2:27) Arkansas – Treylon Burks 85 yard pass from KJ Jefferson, Cam Little kick (Drive: 1 play, 80 yards, 0:11; Arkansas 10–0)

Second quarter

- (13:55) Arkansas – AJ Green 48 yard pass from KJ Jefferson, Cam Little kick (Drive: 4 plays, 82 yards, 1:22; Arkansas 17–0)
- (0:21) Texas A&M – Seth Small 49 yard field goal (Drive: 9 plays, 46 yards, 2:08; Arkansas 17–3)

Third quarter

- (7:51) Texas A&M – Isaiah Spiller 67 yard rush, Seth Small kick (Drive: 3 plays, 75 yards, 1:16; Arkansas 17–10)

Fourth quarter

- (8:39) Arkansas – Cam Little 24 yard field goal (Drive: 9 plays, 42 yards, 3:21; Arkansas 20–10)

| Statistics | TAMU | ARK |
|---|---|---|
| First downs | 15 | 20 |
| Plays–yards | 59–272 | 68–443 |
| Rushes–yards | 23–121 | 49–197 |
| Passing yards | 151 | 246 |
| Passing: comp–att–int | 20–36–1 | 9–19–0 |
| Time of possession | 29:10 | 30:50 |

| Team | Category | Player | Statistics |
|---|---|---|---|
| Texas A&M | Passing | Zach Calzada | 20/36, 151 yards, 1 INT |
| Texas A&M | Rushing | Isaiah Spiller | 12 carries, 95 yards, 1 TD |
| Texas A&M | Receiving | Ainias Smith | 2 receptions, 35 yards |
| Arkansas | Passing | KJ Jefferson | 7/15, 212 yards, 2 TD |
| Arkansas | Rushing | Trelon Smith | 17 carries, 82 yards |
| Arkansas | Receiving | Treylon Burks | 6 receptions, 167 yards, 1 TD |

=== At No. 2 Georgia ===
Game Five – No. 8 Arkansas Razorbacks (4–0) at No. 2 Georgia Bulldogs (4–0)

| Quarter | 1 | 2 | 3 | 4 | Total |
|---|---|---|---|---|---|
| No. 8 Razorbacks | 0 | 0 | 0 | 0 | 0 |
| No. 2 Bulldogs | 21 | 3 | 3 | 10 | 37 |

at Sanford Stadium • Athens, Georgia

- Date: Saturday, October 2, 2021
- Game time: 11:00 a.m. CST
- Game weather: Mostly cloudy • Temperature: 76 °F (24 °C) • Wind: SSW 3 mph
- Game attendance: 92,746
- Referee: Jason Autrey
- TV announcers (ESPN): Chris Fowler (play-by-play), Kirk Herbstreit (analyst), Holly Rowe (sideline)
- ESPN

Game information

First quarter

- (10:46) Georgia – Zamir White 4 yard rush, Jack Podlesny kick (Drive: 9 plays, 75 yards, 4:14; Georgia 7–0)
- (4:34) Georgia – Kendall Milton 1 yard rush, Jack Podlesny kick (Drive: 10 plays, 56 yards, 4:46; Georgia 14–0)
- (2:17) Georgia – Zamir White recovered blocked punt in end zone, Jack Podlesny kick (Georgia 21–0)

Second quarter

- (7:38) Georgia – Jack Podlesny 46 yard field goal (Drive: 9 plays, 51 yards, 4:39; Georgia 24–0)

Third quarter

- (10:05) Georgia – Jack Podlesny 30 yard field goal (Drive: 10 plays, 33 yards, 4:27; Georgia 27–0)

Fourth quarter

- (12:12) Georgia – Zamir White 15 yard rush, Jack Podlesny kick (Drive: 11 plays, 93 yards, 5:50; Georgia 34–0)
- (3:46) Georgia – Jack Podlesny 37 yard field goal (Drive: 10 plays, 42 yards, 6:40; Georgia 37–0)

| Statistics | ARK | UGA |
|---|---|---|
| First downs | 9 | 22 |
| Plays–yards | 45–162 | 68–345 |
| Rushes–yards | 29–75 | 57–273 |
| Passing yards | 87 | 72 |
| Passing: comp–att–int | 10–16–0 | 7–11–0 |
| Time of possession | 23:18 | 36:42 |

| Team | Category | Player | Statistics |
|---|---|---|---|
| Arkansas | Passing | KJ Jefferson | 8/13, 65 yards |
| Arkansas | Rushing | AJ Green | 6 carries, 28 yards |
| Arkansas | Receiving | Raheim Sanders | 1 reception, 22 yards |
| Georgia | Passing | Stetson Bennett | 7/11, 72 yards |
| Georgia | Rushing | James Cook | 12 carries, 87 yards |
| Georgia | Receiving | Ladd McConkey | 3 receptions, 27 yards |

=== At No. 17 Ole Miss ===
Game Six – No. 13 Arkansas Razorbacks (4–1) at No. 17 Ole Miss Rebels (3–1)

| Quarter | 1 | 2 | 3 | 4 | Total |
|---|---|---|---|---|---|
| No. 13 Razorbacks | 7 | 7 | 17 | 20 | 51 |
| No. 17 Rebels | 0 | 21 | 10 | 21 | 52 |

at Vaught–Hemingway Stadium • Oxford, Mississippi

- Date: Saturday, October 9, 2021
- Game time: 11:00 a.m. CST
- Game weather: Sunny • Temperature: 77 °F (25 °C) • Wind: WSW 6 mph
- Referee: Alex Moore
- TV announcers (ESPN): Joe Tessitore (play-by-play), Greg McElroy (analyst), Katie George (sideline)
- ESPN

Game information

First quarter

- (4:17) Arkansas – KJ Jefferson 5 yard rush, Cam Little kick (Drive: 15 plays, 82 yards, 6:55; Arkansas 7–0)

Second quarter

- (13:35) Ole Miss – Matt Corral 5 yard rush, kick failed (Drive: 17 plays, 75 yards, 5:42; Arkansas 7–6)
- (10:32) Arkansas – Trelon Smith 14 yard rush, Cam Little kick (Drive: 9 plays, 75 yards, 3:03; Arkansas 14–6)
- (9:53) Ole Miss – Dontario Drummond 67 yard pass from Matt Corral, 2-point rush good (Drive: 2 plays, 83 yards, 0:33; Tied 14–14)
- (0:42) Ole Miss – Matt Corral 7 yard rush, Caden Costa kick (Drive: 9 plays, 68 yards, 2:39; Ole Miss 21–14)

Third quarter

- (11:38) Ole Miss – Caden Costa 50 yard field goal (Drive: 8 plays, 42 yards, 3:22; Ole Miss 24–14)
- (7:30) Arkansas – Trey Knox 3 yard pass from KJ Jefferson, Cam Little kick (Drive: 9 plays, 75 yards, 4:00; Ole Miss 24–21)
- (4:24) Arkansas – Cam Little 31 yard field goal (Drive: 5 plays, 20 yards, 1:53; Tied 24–24)
- (3:34) Ole Miss – Snoop Conner 51 yard rush, Caden Costa kick (Drive: 3 plays, 79 yards, 0:44; Ole Miss 31–24)
- (1:42) Arkansas – KJ Jefferson 6 yard rush, Cam Little kick (Drive: 4 plays, 75 yards, 1:52; Tied 31–31)

Fourth quarter

- (13:13) Ole Miss – Snoop Conner 34 yard rush, Caden Costa kick (Drive: 10 plays, 75 yards, 3:29; Ole Miss 38–31)
- (11:12) Arkansas – Treylon Burks 20 yard pass from KJ Jefferson, Cam Little kick (Drive: 4 plays, 86 yards, 1:52; Tied 38–38)
- (9:01) Ole Miss – Snoop Conner 1 yard rush, Caden Costa kick (Drive: 7 plays, 75 yards, 2:11; Ole Miss 45–38)
- (1:22) Arkansas – KJ Jefferson 10 yard rush, Cam Little kick (Drive: 8 plays, 65 yards, 2:37; Tied 45–45)
- (1:07) Ole Miss – Braylon Sanders 68 yard pass from Matt Corral, Caden Costa kick (Drive: 2 plays, 75 yards, 0:15; Ole Miss 52–45)
- (0:00) Arkansas – Warren Thompson 9 yard pass from KJ Jefferson, 2-point pass failed (Drive: 9 plays, 75 yards, 1:07; Ole Miss 52–51)

| Statistics | ARK | MISS |
|---|---|---|
| First downs | 39 | 22 |
| Plays–yards | 93–676 | 70–611 |
| Rushes–yards | 58–350 | 49–324 |
| Passing yards | 326 | 287 |
| Passing: comp–att–int | 25–35–1 | 14–21–0 |
| Time of possession | 35:35 | 24:25 |

| Team | Category | Player | Statistics |
|---|---|---|---|
| Arkansas | Passing | KJ Jefferson | 25/35, 326 yards, 3 TD, 1 INT |
| Arkansas | Rushing | Raheim Sanders | 17 carries, 139 yards |
| Arkansas | Receiving | Treylon Burks | 7 receptions, 136 yards, 1 TD |
| Ole Miss | Passing | Matt Corral | 14/21, 287 yards, 2 TD |
| Ole Miss | Rushing | Henry Parrish Jr. | 18 carries, 111 yards |
| Ole Miss | Receiving | Braylon Sanders | 2 receptions, 127 yards, 1 TD |

=== Auburn ===
Game Seven – Auburn Tigers (4–2) at No. 17 Arkansas Razorbacks (4–2)

| Quarter | 1 | 2 | 3 | 4 | Total |
|---|---|---|---|---|---|
| Tigers | 7 | 7 | 14 | 10 | 38 |
| No. 17 Razorbacks | 3 | 7 | 13 | 0 | 23 |

at Donald W. Reynolds Razorback Stadium • Fayetteville, Arkansas

- Date: Saturday, October 16, 2021
- Game time: 11:00 a.m. CST
- Game weather: Sunny • Temperature: 56 °F (13 °C) • Wind: SE 5 mph
- Referee: Lee Hedrick
- TV announcers (CBS): Noah Eagle (play-by-play), Aaron Murray and Rick Neuheisel (analysts), Jenny Dell (sideline)
- ESPN

Game information

First quarter

- (12:16) Auburn – Ja'Varrius Johnson 39 yard pass from Bo Nix, Anders Carlson kick (Drive: 6 plays, 75 yards, 2:44; Auburn 7–0)
- (7:37) Arkansas – Cam Little 44 yard field goal (Drive: 11 plays, 49 yards, 4:39; Auburn 7–3)

Second quarter

- (9:59) Auburn – Tank Bigsby 1 yard rush, Anders Carlson kick (Drive: 9 plays, 65 yards, 4:18; Auburn 14–3)
- (0:18) Arkansas – Treylon Burks 11 yard pass from KJ Jefferson, Cam Little kick (Drive: 12 plays, 84 yards, 2:35; Auburn 14–10)

Third quarter

- (12:30) Arkansas – Treylon Burks 30 yard pass from KJ Jefferson, Cam Little kick (Drive: 6 plays, 75 yards, 2:30; Arkansas 17–14)
- (7:19) Auburn – Marcus Harris recovered fumble in end zone, Anders Carlson kick (Auburn 21–17)
- (4:16) Auburn – Demetris Robertson 71 yard pass from Bo Nix, Anders Carlson kick (Drive: 1 play, 71 yards, 0:11; Auburn 28–17)
- (0:00) Arkansas – Dominique Johnson 10 yard rush, 2-point pass failed (Drive: 13 plays, 75 yards, 4:16; Auburn 28–23)

Fourth quarter

- (10:35) Auburn – Anders Carlson 29 yard field goal (Drive: 9 plays, 63 yards, 4:25; Auburn 31–23)
- (2:30) Auburn – Bo Nix 23 yard rush, Anders Carlson kick (Drive: 12 plays, 75 yards, 6:11; Auburn 38–23)

| Statistics | AUB | ARK |
|---|---|---|
| First downs | 20 | 29 |
| Plays–yards | 61–427 | 89–460 |
| Rushes–yards | 35–135 | 54–232 |
| Passing yards | 292 | 228 |
| Passing: comp–att–int | 21–26–1 | 21–35–0 |
| Time of possession | 30:03 | 29:57 |

| Team | Category | Player | Statistics |
|---|---|---|---|
| Auburn | Passing | Bo Nix | 21/26, 292 yards, 2 TD, 1 INT |
| Auburn | Rushing | Tank Bigsby | 18 carries, 68 yards, 1 TD |
| Auburn | Receiving | Shedrick Jackson | 5 receptions, 61 yards |
| Arkansas | Passing | KJ Jefferson | 21/35, 228 yards, 2 TD |
| Arkansas | Rushing | KJ Jefferson | 18 carries, 66 yards |
| Arkansas | Receiving | Treylon Burks | 9 receptions, 109 yards, 2 TD |

=== Arkansas–Pine Bluff ===
Game Eight – Arkansas–Pine Bluff Golden Lions (1–5) at Arkansas Razorbacks (4–3)

| Quarter | 1 | 2 | 3 | 4 | Total |
|---|---|---|---|---|---|
| Golden Lions | 0 | 0 | 0 | 3 | 3 |
| Razorbacks | 17 | 28 | 0 | 0 | 45 |

at War Memorial Stadium • Little Rock, Arkansas

- Date: Saturday, October 23, 2021
- Game time: 11:00 a.m. CST
- Game weather: Clear • Temperature: 72 °F (22 °C) • Wind: S 7 mph
- Referee: Matt Loeffler
- TV announcers (SEC Network): Dave Neal (play-by-play), Deuce McAllister (analyst), Andraya Carter (sideline)
- ESPN

Game information

First quarter

- (13:38) Arkansas – Blake Kern 18 yard pass from KJ Jefferson, Cam Little kick (Drive: 6 plays, 65 yards, 1:22; Arkansas 7–0)
- (12:16) Arkansas – Treylon Burks 49 yard rush, Cam Little kick (Drive: 1 play, 49 yards, 0:09; Arkansas 14–0)
- (1:12) Arkansas – Cam Little 31 yard field goal (Drive: 12 plays, 71 yards, 3:21; Arkansas 17–0)

Second quarter

- (8:51) Arkansas – Treylon Burks 18 yard pass from KJ Jefferson, Cam Little kick (Drive: 7 plays, 95 yards, 1:44; Arkansas 24–0)
- (6:50) Arkansas – Nathan Parodi 80 yard punt return, Cam Little kick (Arkansas 31–0)
- (2:59) Arkansas – Ketron Jackson 29 yard pass from KJ Jefferson, Cam Little kick (Drive: 3 plays, 68 yards, 0:47; Arkansas 38–0)
- (1:00) Arkansas – Treylon Burks 39 yard pass from KJ Jefferson, Cam Little kick (Drive: 4 plays, 45 yards, 0:46; Arkansas 45–0)

Third quarter
No scoring plays
Fourth quarter

- (6:34) Arkansas–Pine Bluff – Zack Piwniczka 32 yard field goal (Drive: 9 plays, 61 yards, 5:19; Arkansas 45–3)

| Statistics | UAPB | ARK |
|---|---|---|
| First downs | 13 | 25 |
| Plays–yards | 59–223 | 63–504 |
| Rushes–yards | 37–111 | 41–291 |
| Passing yards | 112 | 213 |
| Passing: comp–att–int | 8–22–2 | 11–22–0 |
| Time of possession | 36:18 | 23:42 |

| Team | Category | Player | Statistics |
|---|---|---|---|
| Arkansas–Pine Bluff | Passing | Skyler Perry | 7/18, 107 yards, 1 INT |
| Arkansas–Pine Bluff | Rushing | Kierre Crossley | 13 carries, 39 yards |
| Arkansas–Pine Bluff | Receiving | Daemon Dawkins | 2 receptions, 49 yards |
| Arkansas | Passing | KJ Jefferson | 10/17, 194 yards, 4 TD |
| Arkansas | Rushing | Dominique Johnson | 6 carries, 91 yards |
| Arkansas | Receiving | Treylon Burks | 4 receptions, 89 yards, 2 TD |

=== No. 17 Mississippi State ===
Game Nine – No. 17 Mississippi State Bulldogs (5–3) at Arkansas Razorbacks (5–3)

| Quarter | 1 | 2 | 3 | 4 | Total |
|---|---|---|---|---|---|
| No. 17 Bulldogs | 0 | 7 | 7 | 14 | 28 |
| Razorbacks | 10 | 3 | 3 | 15 | 31 |

at Donald W. Reynolds Razorback Stadium • Fayetteville, Arkansas

- Date: Saturday, November 6, 2021
- Game time: 3:00 p.m. CST
- Game weather: Sunny • Temperature: 62 °F (17 °C) • Wind: NE 3 mph
- Game attendance: 68,818
- Referee: Jason Autrey
- TV announcers (SEC Network): Tom Hart (play-by-play), Jordan Rodgers (analyst), Cole Cubelic (sideline)
- ESPN

Game information

First quarter

- (7:52) Arkansas – Cam Little 46 yard field goal (Drive: 9 plays, 40 yards, 3:31; Arkansas 3–0)
- (3:56) Arkansas – Dominique Johnson 1 yard rush, Cam Little kick (Drive: 7 plays, 52 yards, 2:58; Arkansas 10–0)

Second quarter

- (3:21) Arkansas – Cam Little 48 yard field goal (Drive: 9 plays, 50 yards, 3:48; Arkansas 13–0)
- (0:07) Mississippi State – Jaden Walley 3 yard pass from Will Rogers, Brandon Ruiz kick (Drive: 11 plays, 74 yards, 3:08; Arkansas 13–7)

Third quarter

- (8:15) Mississippi State – RaRa Thomas 6 yard pass from Will Rogers, Brandon Ruiz kick (Drive: 13 plays, 66 yards, 6:36; Mississippi State 14–13)
- (4:38) Arkansas – Cam Little 51 yard field goal (Drive: 10 plays, 42 yards, 3:37; Arkansas 16–14)

Fourth quarter

- (14:10) Arkansas – Treylon Burks 14 yard pass from KJ Jefferson, Cam Little kick (Drive: 9 plays, 72 yards, 3:00; Arkansas 23–14)
- (11:41) Mississippi State – RaRa Thomas 37 yard pass from Will Rogers, Brandon Ruiz kick (Drive: 7 plays, 75 yards, 2:29; Arkansas 23–21)
- (2:22) Mississippi State – Jo'quavious Marks 15 yard pass from Will Rogers, Brandon Ruiz kick (Drive: 9 plays, 76 yards, 5:05; Mississippi State 28–23)
- (0:21) Arkansas – Dominique Johnson 4 yard rush, 2-point rush good (Drive: 10 plays, 75 yards, 2:01; Arkansas 31–28)

| Statistics | MSST | ARK |
|---|---|---|
| First downs | 29 | 23 |
| Plays–yards | 74–486 | 70–393 |
| Rushes–yards | 26–69 | 45–202 |
| Passing yards | 417 | 191 |
| Passing: comp–att–int | 36–48–1 | 19–25–0 |
| Time of possession | 32:14 | 27:46 |

| Team | Category | Player | Statistics |
|---|---|---|---|
| Mississippi State | Passing | Will Rogers | 36/48, 417 yards, 4 TD, 1 INT |
| Mississippi State | Rushing | Jo'Quavious Marks | 11 carries, 40 yards |
| Mississippi State | Receiving | Makai Polk | 8 receptions, 117 yards |
| Arkansas | Passing | KJ Jefferson | 19/23, 191 yards, 1 TD |
| Arkansas | Rushing | Dominique Johnson | 17 carries, 107 yards, 2 TD |
| Arkansas | Receiving | Treylon Burks | 6 receptions, 82 yards, 1 TD |

=== At LSU ===
Game Ten – No. 25 Arkansas Razorbacks (6–3) at LSU Tigers (4–5)

| Quarter | 1 | 2 | 3 | 4 | OT | Total |
|---|---|---|---|---|---|---|
| No. 25 Razorbacks | 3 | 0 | 10 | 0 | 3 | 16 |
| Tigers | 3 | 7 | 0 | 3 | 0 | 13 |

at Tiger Stadium • Baton Rouge, Louisiana

- Date: Saturday, November 13, 2021
- Game time: 6:30 p.m. CST
- Game weather: Clear • Temperature: 51 °F (11 °C) • Wind: SE 3 mph
- Referee: Alex Moore
- TV announcers (SEC Network): Tom Hart (play-by-play), Cole Cubelic (analyst), Tera Talmadge (sideline)
- ESPN

Game information

First quarter

- (11:59) Arkansas – Cam Little 48 yard field goal (Drive: 5 plays, 23 yards, 1:36; Arkansas 3–0)
- (1:47) LSU – Cade York 34 yard field goal (Drive: 9 plays, 28 yards, 3:04; Tied 3–3)

Second quarter

- (14:52) LSU – Jack Bech 29 yard pass from Garrett Nussmeier, Cade York kick (Drive: 3 plays, 40 yards, 0:20; LSU 10–3)

Third quarter

- (6:01) Arkansas – Dominique Johnson 43 yard pass from KJ Jefferson, Cam Little kick (Drive: 5 plays, 63 yards, 2:22; Tied 10–10)
- (0:37) Arkansas – Cam Little 27 yard field goal (Drive: 9 plays, 53 yards, 4:07; Arkansas 13–10)

Fourth quarter

- (10:53) LSU – Cade York 45 yard field goal (Drive: 12 plays, 48, yards, 4:44; Tied 13–13)

Overtime

- Arkansas – Cam Little 37 yard field goal (Drive: 4 plays, 6 yards; Arkansas 16–13)

| Statistics | ARK | LSU |
|---|---|---|
| First downs | 13 | 20 |
| Plays–yards | 66–281 | 79–308 |
| Rushes–yards | 40–139 | 42–108 |
| Passing yards | 142 | 200 |
| Passing: comp–att–int | 18–26–0 | 21–37–2 |
| Time of possession | 27:20 | 32:40 |

| Team | Category | Player | Statistics |
|---|---|---|---|
| Arkansas | Passing | KJ Jefferson | 18/25, 142 yards, 1 TD |
| Arkansas | Rushing | KJ Jefferson | 15 carries, 41 yards |
| Arkansas | Receiving | Dominique Johnson | 2 receptions, 40 yards, 1 TD |
| LSU | Passing | Garrett Nussmeier | 18/31, 179 yards, 1 TD, 2 INT |
| LSU | Rushing | Tyrion Davis-Price | 28 carries, 106 yards |
| LSU | Receiving | Jack Bech | 4 receptions, 66 yards, 1 TD |

=== At No. 2 Alabama ===
Game Eleven – No. 21 Arkansas Razorbacks (7–3) at No. 2 Alabama Crimson Tide (9–1)

| Quarter | 1 | 2 | 3 | 4 | Total |
|---|---|---|---|---|---|
| No. 21 Razorbacks | 0 | 14 | 7 | 14 | 35 |
| No. 2 Crimson Tide | 3 | 21 | 10 | 8 | 42 |

at Bryant–Denny Stadium • Tuscaloosa, Alabama

- Date: Saturday, November 20, 2021
- Game time: 2:30 p.m. CST
- Game weather: Fair • Temperature: 64 °F (18 °C) • Wind: NW 1 mph
- Referee: Lee Hedrick
- TV announcers (CBS): Brad Nessler (play-by-play), Gary Danielson (analyst), Jamie Erdahl (sideline)
- ESPN

Game information

First quarter

- (7:41) Alabama – Will Reichard 48 yard field goal (Drive: 4 plays, 2 yards, 0:46; Alabama 3–0)

Second quarter

- (14:54) Alabama – John Metchie III 20 yard pass from Bryce Young, Will Reichard kick (Drive: 9 plays, 98 yards, 3:36; Alabama 10–0)
- (6:06) Arkansas – Treylon Burks 21 yard pass from KJ Jefferson, Cam Little kick (Drive: 13 plays, 96 yards, 5:05; Alabama 10–7)
- (5:21) Alabama – Jameson Williams 79 yard pass from Bryce Young, Will Reichard kick (Drive: 2 plays, 75 yards, 0:45; Alabama 17–7)
- (3:40) Arkansas – Dominique Johnson 1 yard rush, Cam Little kick (Drive: 7 plays, 75 yards, 2:09; Alabama 17–14)
- (1:44) Alabama – Jameson Williams 32 yard pass from Bryce Young, Will Reichard kick (Drive: 6 plays, 75 yards, 1:56; Alabama 24–14)

Third quarter

- (11:31) Alabama – Christian Leary 11 yard pass from Bryce Young, Will Reichard kick (Drive: 9 plays, 75 yards, 3:29; Alabama 31–14)
- (10:09) Arkansas – Treylon Burks 66 yard pass from KJ Jefferson, Cam Little kick (Drive: 3 plays, 75 yards, 1:22; Alabama 31–21)
- (1:09) Alabama – Will Reichard 30 yard field goal (Drive: 9 plays, 63 yards, 3:06; Alabama 34–21)

Fourth quarter

- (11:24) Arkansas – Blake Kern 32 yard pass from Reid Bauer, Cam Little kick (Drive: 10 plays, 75 yards, 4:45; Alabama 34–28)
- (5:39) Alabama – Jameson Williams 40 yard pass from Bryce Young, 2-point rush good (Drive: 4 plays, 55 yards, 1:51; Alabama 42–28)
- (1:02) Arkansas – Raheim Sanders 17 yard pass from KJ Jefferson, Cam Little kick (Drive: 12 plays, 75 yards, 4:37; Alabama 42–35)

| Statistics | ARK | BAMA |
|---|---|---|
| First downs | 21 | 29 |
| Plays–yards | 73–468 | 76–671 |
| Rushes–yards | 42–110 | 36–112 |
| Passing yards | 358 | 559 |
| Passing: comp–att–int | 23–31–0 | 31–40–0 |
| Time of possession | 29:30 | 30:30 |

| Team | Category | Player | Statistics |
|---|---|---|---|
| Arkansas | Passing | KJ Jefferson | 22/30, 326 yards, 3 TD |
| Arkansas | Rushing | Trelon Smith | 9 carries, 42 yards |
| Arkansas | Receiving | Treylon Burks | 8 receptions, 179 yards, 2 TD |
| Alabama | Passing | Bryce Young | 31/40, 559 yards, 5 TD |
| Alabama | Rushing | Brian Robinson Jr. | 27 carries, 122 yards |
| Alabama | Receiving | Jameson Williams | 8 receptions, 190 yards, 3 TD |

=== Missouri ===
Game Twelve – Missouri Tigers (6–5) at No. 25 Arkansas Razorbacks (7–4)

| Quarter | 1 | 2 | 3 | 4 | Total |
|---|---|---|---|---|---|
| Tigers | 0 | 6 | 3 | 8 | 17 |
| No. 25 Razorbacks | 3 | 7 | 14 | 10 | 34 |

at Donald W. Reynolds Razorback Stadium • Fayetteville, Arkansas

- Date: Friday, November 26, 2021
- Game time: 2:30 p.m. CST
- Game weather: Sunny • Temperature: 54 °F (12 °C) • Wind: NE 12 mph
- Game attendance: 67,320
- Referee: Steve Marlowe
- TV announcers (CBS): Noah Eagle (play-by-play), Aaron Murray and Rick Neuheisel (analysts), Jenny Dell (sideline)
- ESPN

Game information

First quarter

- (10:01) Arkansas – Cam Little 36 yard field goal (Drive: 8 plays, 67 yards, 3:22; Arkansas 3–0)

Second quarter

- (13:27) Missouri – Harrison Mevis 45 yard field goal (Drive: 7 plays, 11 yards, 3:53; Tied 3–3)
- (5:53) Arkansas – Raheim Sanders 1 yard rush, Cam Little kick (Drive: 8 plays, 76 yards, 2:50; Arkansas 10–3)
- (3:02) Missouri – Harrison Mevis 49 yard field goal (Drive: 8 plays, 44 yards, 2:51; Arkansas 10–6)

Third quarter

- (11:13) Arkansas – Trelon Smith 4 yard rush, Cam Little kick (Drive: 3 plays, 61 yards, 1:11; Arkansas 17–6)
- (9:49) Arkansas – Treylon Burks 52 yard pass from KJ Jefferson, Cam Little kick (Drive: 2 plays, 52 yards, 0:16; Arkansas 24–6)
- (2:03) Missouri – Harrison Mevis 41 yard field goal (Drive: 14 plays, 51 yards, 7:45; Arkansas 24–9)

Fourth quarter

- (11:44) Arkansas – Cam Little 23 yard field goal (Drive: 11 plays, 70 yards, 5:19; Arkansas 27–9)
- (9:52) Arkansas – Raheim Sanders 7 yard rush, Cam Little kick (Drive: 4 plays, 47 yards, 1:45; Arkansas 34–9)
- (1:25) Missouri – Tyler Badie 5 yard rush, 2-point pass good (Drive: 11 plays, 58 yards, 4:22; Arkansas 34–17)

| Statistics | MIZ | ARK |
|---|---|---|
| First downs | 19 | 14 |
| Plays–yards | 76–316 | 53–425 |
| Rushes–yards | 50–251 | 33–163 |
| Passing yards | 65 | 262 |
| Passing: comp–att–int | 10–26–1 | 15–20–0 |
| Time of possession | 35:11 | 24:49 |

| Team | Category | Player | Statistics |
|---|---|---|---|
| Missouri | Passing | Connor Bazelak | 10/26, 65 yards, 1 INT |
| Missouri | Rushing | Tyler Badie | 41 carries, 219 yards, 1 TD |
| Missouri | Receiving | Keke Chism | 3 receptions, 37 yards |
| Arkansas | Passing | KJ Jefferson | 15/19, 262 yards, 1 TD |
| Arkansas | Rushing | KJ Jefferson | 6 carries, 58 yards |
| Arkansas | Receiving | Treylon Burks | 7 receptions, 129 yards, 1 TD |

=== Vs. Penn State—Outback Bowl ===
Game Thirteen – No. 21 Arkansas Razorbacks (8–4) vs. Penn State Nittany Lions (7–5)

| Quarter | 1 | 2 | 3 | 4 | Total |
|---|---|---|---|---|---|
| Nittany Lions | 0 | 10 | 0 | 0 | 10 |
| No. 21 Razorbacks | 7 | 0 | 17 | 0 | 24 |

at Raymond James Stadium • Tampa, Florida

- Date: Saturday, January 1
- Game time: 11:00 a.m. CST
- Game attendance: 46577
- TV announcers (ESPN2): Dave Flemming (play-by-play), Rod Gilmore (analyst), Stormy Buonantony (sideline)

Game information

First quarter

- (0:00) ARK – Raheim Sanders 3 yard rush, Cam Little kick (Drive: 12 plays, 61 yards, 5:42; Arkansas 7–0)

Second quarter

- (10:53) PSU – KeAndre Lambert-Smith 42 yard pass from Sean Clifford, Jake Pinegar kick (Drive: 1 play, 42 yards, 0:07; Tied 7–7)
- (5:19) PSU – Jake Pinegar 33 yard field goal (Drive: 7 plays, 56 yards, 2:40; PSU 10–7)

Third quarter

- (12:42) ARK – KJ Jefferson 8 yard rush, Cam Little kick (Drive: 7 plays, 75 yards, 2:18; Arkansas 14–10)
- (5:19) ARK – Cam Little 36 yard field goal (Drive: 10 plays, 45 yards, 4:32; Arkansas 17–10)
- (2:08) ARK – Raheim Sanders 1 yard rush, Cam Little kick (Drive: 4 plays, 79 yards, 1:38; Arkansas 24–10)

Fourth quarter

Outback Bowl MVP – Arkansas QB K. J. Jefferson

| Statistics | PSU | ARK |
|---|---|---|
| First downs | 18 | 25 |
| Plays–yards | 63–323 | 78–451 |
| Rushes–yards | 28–125 | 58–353 |
| Passing yards | 198 | 98 |
| Passing: comp–att–int | 15–35–2 | 14–20–2 |
| Time of possession | 24:13 | 35:21 |

| Team | Category | Player | Statistics |
|---|---|---|---|
| Penn State | Passing | Sean Clifford | 14/32, 195 yards, 1 TD |
| Penn State | Rushing | Sean Clifford | 12 carries, 46 yards |
| Penn State | Receiving | Parker Washington | 7 catches, 98 yards |
| Arkansas | Passing | KJ Jefferson | 14/19, 98 yards |
| Arkansas | Rushing | KJ Jefferson | 20 carries, 110 yards, 1 TD |
| Arkansas | Receiving | De'Vion Warren | 3 catches, 33 yards |

== Personnel ==
=== Coaching staff ===
Arkansas Razorbacks coaches
| Sam Pittman | Head coach | 2nd |
| Kendal Briles | Offensive coordinator/quarterbacks coach | 2nd |
| Barry Odom | Defensive coordinator/Safeties coach | 2nd |
| Scott Fountain | Assistant head coach/Special teams coordinator | 2nd |
| Dowell Loggains | Tight ends coach | 1st |
| Cody Kennedy | Offensive line coach | 1st |
| Kenny Guiton | Wide receivers coach | 1st |
| Jimmy Smith | Running backs coach | 2nd |
| Michael Scherer | Linebackers coach | 1st |
| Jermial Ashley | Defensive line coach | 1st |
| Sam Carter | Cornerbacks coach | 2nd |
| Jamil Walker | Strength and conditioning coach | 2nd |

=== Roster ===
2021 Arkansas Razorbacks football team roster
Players
Coaches
Offense

| Pos. | # | Name | Class |
|---|---|---|---|
| RB | 0 | AJ Green | Fr |
| QB | 1 | KJ Jefferson (C) | So |
| WR | 2 | Ketron Jackson Jr. | Fr |
| QB | 3 | Lucas Coley | Fr |
| QB | 4 | Malik Hornsby | Fr |
| RB | 5 | Raheim Sanders | Fr |
| WR | 6 | Kendall Catalon | Sr |
| WR | 7 | Trey Knox | Jr |
| QB | 9 | John Stephen Jones | Jr |
| WR | 10 | De'Vion Warren | Sr |
| WR | 11 | Jaquayln Crawford | Jr |
| WR | 13 | Jaedon Wilson | Fr |
| WR | 14 | Bryce Stephens | Fr |
| TE | 15 | Landon Rogers | Fr |
| WR | 16 | Treylon Burks | Jr |
| WR | 17 | John David White | So |
| QB | 18 | Kade Renfro | Fr |
| WR | 19 | Tyson Morris | Sr |
| RB | 20 | Dominique Johnson | So |
| RB | 21 | Javion Hunt | Fr |
| RB | 22 | Trelon Smith | Jr |
| RB | 23 | Josh Oglesby | Jr |
| RB | 26 | Donte Buckner | Fr |
| RB | 32 | Reid Turner | So |
| TE | 36 | Erin Outley | Fr |
| TE | 39 | Nathan Johnson | Fr |
| RB | 41 | T.J. Hammonds | Sr |
| TE | 42 | Zach Lee | Fr |
| OL | 50 | Cole Carson | Fr |
| OL | 51 | Ricky Stromberg | Jr |
| OL | 53 | Ty'Kieast Crawford | So |
| OL | 54 | Austin Nix | Jr |
| OL | 55 | Beaux Limmer | So |
| OL | 56 | Marcus Henderson | So |
| OL | 57 | Shane Clenin | Sr |
| OL | 62 | Brady Latham | So |
| OL | 63 | Terry Wells | Fr |
| OL | 65 | Devon Manuel | Fr |
| OL | 66 | Ty Clary | Sr |
| OL | 67 | Josh Street | Fr |
| OL | 70 | Luke Jones | Jr |
| OL | 71 | Ryan Winkel | Jr |
| OL | 72 | Drew Vest | So |
| OL | 74 | Jalen St. John | Fr |
| OL | 75 | Ray Curry Jr. | Fr |
| OL | 76 | Myron Cunningham (C) | Sr |
| OL | 78 | Dalton Wagner | Sr |
| OL | 79 | Dalton Rathcke | So |
| TE | 80 | Collin Sutherland | Fr |
| WR | 81 | Darin Turner | Fr |
| TE | 82 | Hudson Henry | So |
| WR | 83 | Chris Harris | Fr |
| WR | 84 | Warren Thompson | Jr |
| WR | 85 | Harper Cole | Fr |
| TE | 87 | Blake Kern | Sr |
| TE | 89 | Nathan Bax | So |

Defense

| Pos. | # | Name | Class |
|---|---|---|---|
| DL | 0 | Markell Utsey | Sr |
| DB | 1 | Jalen Catalon (C) | So |
| DB | 2 | Myles Slusher | So |
| DB | 3 | Nick Turner | Fr |
| DB | 4 | Malik Chavis | So |
| DL | 5 | Dorian Gerald | Sr |
| DB | 6 | Jacorrei Turner | Fr |
| DB | 7 | Joe Foucha (C) | Sr |
| DB | 8 | Jayden Johnson | Fr |
| DB | 9 | Greg Brooks Jr. | Jr |
| LB | 10 | Bumper Pool | Sr |
| DL | 11 | Mataio Soli | Jr |
| DB | 14 | Nathan Parodi | Jr |
| DB | 15 | Simeon Blair | Jr |
| DB | 16 | Keuan Parker | Fr |
| DB | 17 | Hudson Clark | So |
| DB | 18 | Trent Gordon | Jr |
| DB | 19 | Khari Johnson | So |
| LB | 20 | Zach Zimos | So |
| DB | 21 | Montaric Brown | Sr |
| LB | 22 | Deon Edwards | Sr |
| DB | 23 | Devin Bush | So |
| DB | 24 | LaDarrius Bishop | Jr |
| LB | 25 | Marco Avant | Fr |
| DB | 26 | Kevin Compton | Fr |
| LB | 27 | Hayden Henry | Sr |
| LB | 28 | Andrew Parker | Jr |
| DB | 29 | Cade Pearson | Jr |
| LB | 31 | Grant Morgan (C) | Sr |
| DB | 32 | Chase Lowery | Fr |
| LB | 33 | Kelin Burrle | Fr |
| LB | 34 | J.T. Towers | Fr |
| LB | 35 | Jake Yurachek | Jr |
| DB | 36 | Jermaine Hamilton-Jordan | Fr |
| DL | 37 | Eric Thomas Jr. | So |
| DB | 38 | Jon Conley | So |
| LB | 40 | Chris Paul Jr. | Fr |
| LB | 43 | Brooks Both | Fr |
| DL | 44 | Andy Boykin | Fr |
| LB | 45 | Jackson Woodard | Fr |
| LB | 47 | Jordan Hanna | Fr |
| LB | 49 | McKinley Williams | Jr |
| DL | 50 | Eric Gregory | So |
| DL | 52 | Solomon Wright | Fr |
| DL | 55 | Tre Williams | Sr |
| DL | 56 | Zach Williams | Jr |
| DL | 58 | Jashaud Stewart | So |
| DL | 90 | Marcus Miller | So |
| DL | 91 | Taurean Carter | So |
| DL | 92 | Cameron Ball | Fr |
| DL | 93 | Isaiah Nichols | Jr |
| DL | 94 | Jon Hill | Fr |
| DL | 95 | Morgan Hanna | So |
| DL | 97 | Jalen Williams | Jr |
| DL | 99 | John Ridgeway III | Sr |

Special teams

| Pos. | # | Name | Class |
|---|---|---|---|
| K/P | 29 | Cam Little | Fr |
| P | 30 | Reid Bauer | Jr |
| P | 42 | Sam Loy | Sr |
| LS | 46 | Francisco Castro | Fr |
| LS | 48 | Jordan Silver | Sr |
| LS | 52 | John Oehrlein | So |
| K/P | 80 | Matthew Phillips | Jr |
| K | 90 | Vito Calvaruso | So |
| P | 94 | Patrick Foley | Fr |

Head coach

- Sam Pittman

Coordinators/assistant coaches

- Kendal Briles (OC)
- Barry Odom (DC)
- Michael Scherer (LB)

Legend

- (C) Team captain
- (S) Suspended
- (I) Ineligible
- Injured
- Redshirt

Roster
Last update: August 24, 2021

=== Recruits ===
Arkansas signed 22 recruits for the 2021 class, 21 from high school and one from junior college.

College recruiting information (2021)
| Name | Hometown | School | Height | Weight | Commit date |
|---|---|---|---|---|---|
| Ketron Jackson; WR | Royse City, Texas | | 6 ft 2 in (1.88 m) | 186 lb (84 kg) | |
| Ketron Jackson; WR | Recruit ratings: Rivals: 247Sports: ESPN: | | | | |
| A. J. Green; RB | Tulsa, Oklahoma | Union | 5 ft 11 in (1.80 m) | 194 lb (88 kg) | |
| A. J. Green; RB | Recruit ratings: Rivals: 247Sports: ESPN: | | | | |
| Raheim Sanders; ATH | Rockledge, Florida | | 6 ft 2 in (1.88 m) | 210 lb (95 kg) | |
| Raheim Sanders; ATH | Recruit ratings: Rivals: 247Sports: ESPN: | | | | |
| Javion Hunt; RB | Oklahoma City, Oklahoma | Carl Albert | 6 ft 0 in (1.83 m) | 205 lb (93 kg) | |
| Javion Hunt; RB | Recruit ratings: Rivals: 247Sports: ESPN: | | | | |
| Lucas Coley; QB | San Antonio, Texas | Cornerstone Christian | 6 ft 2 in (1.88 m) | 203 lb (92 kg) | |
| Lucas Coley; QB | Recruit ratings: Rivals: 247Sports: ESPN: | | | | |
| Terry Wells; OL | Wynne, Arkansas | | 6 ft 4 in (1.93 m) | 306 lb (139 kg) | |
| Terry Wells; OL | Recruit ratings: Rivals: 247Sports: ESPN: | | | | |
| Cameron Ball; DL | Atlanta, Georgia | Tri-Cities | 6 ft 5 in (1.96 m) | 300 lb (140 kg) | |
| Cameron Ball; DL | Recruit ratings: Rivals: 247Sports: ESPN: | | | | |
| Jalen Williams; DT | Tylertown, Mississippi | Jones Jr. College, MS. | 6 ft 3 in (1.91 m) | 310 lb (140 kg) | |
| Jalen Williams; DT | Recruit ratings: Rivals: 247Sports: ESPN: | | | | |
| Keaun Parker; CB | Tulsa, Oklahoma | Washington | 5 ft 11 in (1.80 m) | 174 lb (79 kg) | |
| Keaun Parker; CB | Recruit ratings: Rivals: 247Sports: ESPN: | | | | |
| Cole Carson; OL | Bogata, Texas | Rivercrest | 6 ft 5 in (1.96 m) | 285 lb (129 kg) | |
| Cole Carson; OL | Recruit ratings: Rivals: 247Sports: ESPN: | | | | |
| Bryce Stephens; WR | Oklahoma City, Oklahoma | John Marshall | 6 ft 0 in (1.83 m) | 170 lb (77 kg) | |
| Bryce Stephens; WR | Recruit ratings: Rivals: 247Sports: ESPN: | | | | |
| Jayden Johnson; S | Cedartown, Georgia | | 6 ft 2 in (1.88 m) | 200 lb (91 kg) | |
| Jayden Johnson; S | Recruit ratings: Rivals: 247Sports: ESPN: | | | | |
| Jaedon Wilson; WR | DeSoto, Texas | | 6 ft 3 in (1.91 m) | 172 lb (78 kg) | |
| Jaedon Wilson; WR | Recruit ratings: Rivals: 247Sports: ESPN: | | | | |
| Solomon Wright; DL | Vian, Oklahoma | | 6 ft 1 in (1.85 m) | 275 lb (125 kg) | |
| Solomon Wright; DL | Recruit ratings: Rivals: 247Sports: ESPN: | | | | |
| Christopher Paul; LB | Cordele, Georgia | Crisp County | 6 ft 1 in (1.85 m) | 235 lb (107 kg) | |
| Christopher Paul; LB | Recruit ratings: Rivals: 247Sports: ESPN: | | | | |
| Chase Lowery; CB | Frisco, Texas | | 6 ft 0 in (1.83 m) | 180 lb (82 kg) | |
| Chase Lowery; CB | Recruit ratings: Rivals: 247Sports: ESPN: | | | | |
| Marco Avant; LB | Jonesboro, Arkansas | | 6 ft 3 in (1.91 m) | 212 lb (96 kg) | |
| Marco Avant; LB | Recruit ratings: Rivals: 247Sports: ESPN: | | | | |
| Jermaine Hamilton-Jordan; S | Kansas City, Missouri | Lincoln College Prep | 6 ft 1 in (1.85 m) | 195 lb (88 kg) | |
| Jermaine Hamilton-Jordan; S | Recruit ratings: Rivals: 247Sports: ESPN: | | | | |
| Erin Outley; TE | Little Rock, Arkansas | Parkview | 6 ft 4 in (1.93 m) | 255 lb (116 kg) | |
| Erin Outley; TE | Recruit ratings: Rivals: 247Sports: ESPN: | | | | |
| Landon Rogers; QB | Little Rock, Arkansas | Parkview | 6 ft 4 in (1.93 m) | 215 lb (98 kg) | |
| Landon Rogers; QB | Recruit ratings: Rivals: 247Sports: ESPN: | | | | |
| Devon Manuel; OL | Arnaudville, Louisiana | Beau Chene | 6 ft 8 in (2.03 m) | 300 lb (140 kg) | |
| Devon Manuel; OL | Recruit ratings: Rivals: 247Sports: ESPN: | | | | |
| Cameron Little; PK | Moore, Oklahoma | Southmoore | 6 ft 2 in (1.88 m) | 170 lb (77 kg) | |
| Cameron Little; PK | Recruit ratings: Rivals: 247Sports: ESPN: | | | | |
Overall recruit ranking:
Note: In many cases, Scout, Rivals, 247Sports, On3, and ESPN may conflict in their listings of height and weight.; In these cases, the average was taken. ESPN grades are on a 100-point scale.; Sources: "Arkansas Football Commitments". Rivals.; "2021 Team Ranking". Rivals.com.

=== Transfers ===
Arkansas signed six players from the transfer portal for the 2021 class.

| Position | Player | Height | Weight | Hometown | Rating | Year | Previous school |
|---|---|---|---|---|---|---|---|
| QB | Kade Renfro | 6 feet 3 inches (1.91 m) | 208 pounds (94 kg) | Stephenville, Texas | 3 stars | Redshirt freshman | Ole Miss |
| OL | Ty'Kieast Crawford | 6 feet 5 inches (1.96 m) | 355 pounds (161 kg) | Carthage, Texas | 4 stars | Sophomore | Charlotte |
| CB | Trent Gordon | 5 feet 11 inches (1.80 m) | 195 pounds (88 kg) | Manvel, Texas | 3 stars | Junior | Penn State |
| DL | John Ridgeway III | 6 feet 6 inches (1.98 m) | 325 pounds (147 kg) | Bloomington, Illinois | 2 stars | Senior | Illinois State |
| DL | Markell Utsey | 6 feet 4 inches (1.93 m) | 300 pounds (140 kg) | Little Rock, Arkansas | 3 stars | Senior | Missouri |
| DE | Tre Williams | 6 feet 5 inches (1.96 m) | 260 pounds (120 kg) | Columbia, Missouri | 3 stars | Senior | Missouri |

== Awards and honors ==
WR Treylon Burks – AP and Coaches 1st Team All-SEC

CB Montaric Brown – Coaches 1st Team All-SEC

LB Bumper Pool – AP and Coaches 2nd Team All-SEC

C Ricky Stromberg – AP 2nd Team All-SEC

RB Raheim Sanders – SEC All-Freshman Team

PK Cam Little – SEC All-Freshman Team; Freshman All-American

LB Grant Morgan – 2021 Burlsworth Trophy winner

P/H Reid Bauer – 2021 Peter Mortell Holder of the Year Award winner

QB KJ Jefferson – Outback Bowl MVP

HC Sam Pittman – AFCA Region 2 Coach of the Year

== Statistics ==
=== Team ===
==== Scores by quarter ====
| | 1 | 2 | 3 | 4 | OT | Total |
|---|---|---|---|---|---|---|
| Arkansas | 84 | 96 | 122 | 97 | 3 | 402 |
| All opponents | 34 | 105 | 68 | 91 | 0 | 298 |

== Players drafted in the NFL ==
Arkansas had three players selected in the 2022 NFL draft.

| Round | Pick | Player | Position | NFL club |
|---|---|---|---|---|
| 1 | 18 | Treylon Burks | WR | Tennessee Titans |
| 5 | 178 | John Ridgeway III | DT | Dallas Cowboys |
| 7 | 222 | Montaric Brown | CB | Jacksonville Jaguars |
