= 2021 Auburn Tigers football team =

American college football season

2021 Auburn Tigers football

Birmingham Bowl, L 13–17 vs. Houston
- Conference: Southeastern Conference
- Western Division
- Record: 6–7 (3–5 SEC)
- Head coach: Bryan Harsin (1st season)
- Offensive coordinator: Mike Bobo (1st season)
- Offensive scheme: Singleback
- Defensive coordinator: Derek Mason (1st season)
- Base defense: 3–4
- Home stadium: Jordan–Hare Stadium

2021 Southeastern Conference football standings
	Conf.			Overall
Team	W		L	W		L
Eastern Division
No. 1 Georgia x#^	8	–	0	14	–	1
No. 18 Kentucky*	5	–	3	10	–	3
Tennessee	4	–	4	7	–	6
Missouri	3	–	5	6	–	7
South Carolina	3	–	5	7	–	6
Florida	2	–	6	6	–	7
Vanderbilt	0	–	8	2	–	10
Western Division
No. 2 Alabama x$^	7	–	1	13	–	2
No. 11 Ole Miss	6	–	2	10	–	3
No. 21 Arkansas	4	–	4	9	–	4
Mississippi State	4	–	4	7	–	6
Texas A&M	4	–	4	8	–	4
Auburn	3	–	5	6	–	7
LSU	3	–	5	6	–	7
Championship: Alabama 41, Georgia 24
# – College Football Playoff champion; ^ – College Football Playoff participant; $ – Conference champion; x – Division champion/co-champions; * – Kentucky vacated all wins due to NCAA violations.; Rankings from AP Poll

The 2021 Auburn Tigers football team represented Auburn University in the 2021 NCAA Division I FBS football season. The Tigers played their home games at Jordan–Hare Stadium in Auburn, Alabama, and competed in the Western Division of the Southeastern Conference (SEC). They were led by first-year head coach Bryan Harsin. They finished the season at 6–7, the program's first season finishing below .500 since 2012.

== Preseason ==
=== Spring game ===
The A-Day spring game was held on Saturday, April 17. Team Auburn defeated Team Tigers 17–3. Running back Tank Bigsby was named Offensive MVP, cornerback Trey Elston was named Defensive MVP, and kicker Anders Carlson was named Special Teams MVP.

2021 Auburn A-Day Game

Quarter	1	2	3	4	Total
Tigers	0	3	0	0	3
Auburn	0	17	0	0	17

at Jordan-Hare Stadium • Auburn, Alabama

- Date: April 17, 2021
- Game time: 1:02 p.m. CDT
- Game weather: Partly Cloudy • Temperature: 70 °F (21 °C) • Wind: 4 mph SW
- Game attendance: 25,210
- Referee: Marc Curles
- TV announcers (SEC Network+): Dave Neal (play-by-play), Matt Stinchcomb (analyst), Dawn Davenport (sideline reporter)

=== Award watch lists ===
Listed in the order that they were released

Award	Player	Position	Year
Lott Trophy	Zakoby McClain	LB	Sr.
Maxwell Award	Bo Nix	QB	Jr.
Maxwell Award	Tank Bigsby	RB	So.
Bednarik Award	Zakoby McClain	LB	Sr.
Doak Walker Award	Tank Bigsby	RB	So.
John Mackey Award	John Samuel Shenker	TE	Sr.
Jim Thorpe Award	Smoke Monday	DB	Sr.
Butkus Award	Zakoby McClain	LB	Sr.
Outland Trophy	Nick Brahms	OL	Sr.
Bronko Nagurski Trophy	Zakoby McClain	LB	Sr.
Bronko Nagurski Trophy	Smoke Monday	DB	Sr.
Lou Groza Award	Anders Carlson	K	Sr.
Wuerffel Trophy	Nick Brahms	OL	Sr.
Walter Camp Award	Tank Bigsby	RB	So.

=== SEC media days ===
The SEC Media Days were held July 19–22, 2021 at the Hyatt Regency Birmingham – The Wynfrey Hotel in Hoover, Alabama. Coach Bryan Harsin, quarterback Bo Nix, and linebacker Owen Pappoe spoke on Thursday, July 22.

Media poll (West Division)
Predicted finish	Team	Votes (1st place)
1	Alabama	932 (130)
2	Texas A&M	760 (1)
3	LSU	633 (1)
4	Ole Miss	529 (1)
5	Auburn	440
6	Arkansas	241 (1)
7	Mississippi State	217

Media poll (SEC Championship)
Rank	Team	Votes
1	Alabama	84
2	Georgia	45
3	Ole Miss	1

=== Preseason All-SEC teams ===
Offense

1st team

Tank Bigsby – RB

Nick Brahms – C

3rd team

Bo Nix – QB

Defense

2nd team

Zakoby McClain – LB

Smoke Monday – DB

3rd team

Derick Hall – DL

Owen Pappoe – LB

Roger McCreary – DB

Specialists

2nd team

Tank Bigsby – AP

3rd team

Anders Carlson – PK

== Staff ==
Name	Position	Consecutive season at Auburn in current position
Bryan Harsin	Head coach	1st
Mike Bobo	Offensive coordinator/quarterbacks	1st
Derek Mason	Defensive coordinator	1st
Brad Bedell	Tight ends coach	1st
Eric Kiesau	Wide receivers coach	1st
Will Friend	Offensive line coach	1st
Cadillac Williams	Running backs coach	3rd
Nick Eason	Defensive line coach	1st
Jeff Schmedding	Inside Linebackers Coach	1st
Bert Watts	Special Teams & Outside Linebackers Coach	1st
Zac Etheridge	Cornerbacks coach	1st

- Cornelius Williams was fired as wide receivers coach after 4 games.
- Mike Bobo was fired as Offensive coordinator/quarterbacks coach on November 29, 2021.

== Schedule ==
Date	Time	Opponent	Rank	Site	TV	Result	Attendance
September 4	6:00 p.m.	Akron*		Jordan–Hare Stadium; Auburn, AL	ESPN+/SECN+	W 60–10	83,821
September 11	11:00 a.m.	Alabama State*	No. 25	Jordan–Hare Stadium; Auburn, AL	SECN	W 62–0	82,745
September 18	6:30 p.m.	at No. 10 Penn State*	No. 22	Beaver Stadium; State College, PA (College GameDay/White Out)	ABC	L 20–28	109,958
September 25	3:00 p.m.	Georgia State*^{†}	No. 23	Jordan–Hare Stadium; Auburn, AL	SECN	W 34–24	86,650
October 2	8:00 p.m.	at LSU	No. 22	Tiger Stadium; Baton Rouge, LA (Tiger Bowl)	ESPN	W 24–19	97,717
October 9	2:30 p.m.	No. 2 Georgia	No. 18	Jordan–Hare Stadium; Auburn, AL (Deep South's Oldest Rivalry)	CBS	L 10–34	87,451
October 16	11:00 a.m.	at No. 17 Arkansas		Donald W. Reynolds Razorback Stadium; Fayetteville, AR	CBS	W 38–23	73,370
October 30	6:00 p.m.	No. 10 Ole Miss	No. 18	Jordan–Hare Stadium; Auburn, AL (rivalry)	ESPN	W 31–20	87,451
November 6	2:30 p.m.	at No. 14 Texas A&M	No. 13	Kyle Field; College Station, TX (SEC Nation)	CBS	L 3–20	109,835
November 13	11:00 a.m.	Mississippi State	No. 17	Jordan–Hare Stadium; Auburn, AL	ESPN	L 34–43	87,451
November 20	6:00 p.m.	at South Carolina		Williams–Brice Stadium; Columbia, SC	ESPN	L 17–21	70,299
November 27	2:30 p.m.	No. 3 Alabama		Jordan–Hare Stadium; Auburn, AL (Iron Bowl / SEC Nation)	CBS	L 22–24 ^{4OT}	87,451
December 28	11:00 a.m.	vs. No. 20 Houston*		Protective Stadium; Birmingham, AL (Birmingham Bowl)	ESPN	L 13–17	47,100
*Non-conference game; ^{†}Homecoming; Rankings from AP Poll (and CFP Rankings, after November 2) - Released prior to game; All times are in Central time

Schedule source:

== Game summaries ==
=== Akron ===
Game One – Akron Zips (0–0) at Auburn Tigers (0–0)

Quarter	1	2	3	4	Total
Zips	0	0	0	10	10
Tigers	13	24	16	7	60

at Jordan–Hare Stadium • Auburn, Alabama

- Date: Saturday, September 4, 2021
- Game time: 6:05 p.m. CDT
- Game weather: Sunny • Temperature: 85 °F (29 °C) • Wind: NE 5 mph
- Game attendance: 83,821
- Referee: Ken Williamson
- TV announcers (ESPN+/SEC Network+): Mike Corey (play-by-play), Ben Hartsock (analyst), Taylor Davis (sideline reporter)
- Box Score

Statistics	AKR	AUB
First downs	12	28
Plays–yards	63–188	58–613
Rushes–yards	36–−3	31–316
Passing yards	191	297
Passing: comp–att–int	22–27–0	22–27–0
Turnovers		
Time of possession	35:44	24:16

Team	Category	Player	Statistics
Akron	Passing	DJ Irons	13/13, 129 yds, 1 TD
Akron	Rushing	Jonzell Norrils	12 carries, 22 yds
Akron	Receiving	Michael Mathison	7 receptions, 68 yds
Auburn	Passing	Bo Nix	20/22, 375 yds, 3 TD
Auburn	Rushing	Tank Bigsby	13 carries, 119 yds, 2 TD
Auburn	Receiving	Shedrick Jackson	5 receptions, 79 yds

Scoring summary

Quarter	Time	Drive			Team	Scoring information	Score	
Quarter	Time	Plays	Yards	TOP	Team	Scoring information	Akron	Auburn
1	6:55	6	65	2:28	AUB	Tank Bigsby 32-yard touchdown run, Anders Carlson kick failed	0	6
1	1:14	7	66	3:18	AUB	Shaun Shivers 19-yard touchdown reception from Bo Nix, Anders Carlson kick good	0	13
2	14:54	1	34	0:08	AUB	Ja'Varrius Johnson 34-yard touchdown reception from Bo Nix, Anders Carlson kick good	0	20
2	9:44	6	92	2:52	AUB	Kobe Hudson 28-yard touchdown reception from Bo Nix, Anders Carlson kick good	0	27
2	3:13	9	45	3:52	AUB	Tank Bigsby 1-yard touchdown run, Anders Carlson kick good	0	34
2	0:02	8	65	1:04	AUB	44-yard field goal by Anders Carlson	0	37
3	12:49	5	75	2:11	AUB	Shaun Shivers 26-yard touchdown run, Anders Carlson kick good	0	44
3	11:06	—	—	—	AUB	0 yd safety	0	46
3	8:01	5	62	2:18	AUB	T. J. Finley 1-yard touchdown run, Anders Carlson kick good	0	53
4	13:28	11	80	6:30	AKR	Jonzell Norrils 4-yard touchdown reception from DJ Irons, Cory Smigel kick good	7	53
4	2:48	13	40	8:55	AKR	40-yard field goal by Cory Smigel	10	53
4	0:28	5	65	2:10	AUB	Jarquez Hunter 9-yard touchdown run, Anders Carlson kick good	10	60
"TOP" = time of possession. For other American football terms, see Glossary of American football.							10	60

=== Alabama State ===
Game Two – Alabama State Hornets (1–0) at No. 25 Auburn Tigers (1–0)

Quarter	1	2	3	4	Total
Hornets	0	0	0	0	0
No. 25 Tigers	6	14	35	7	62

at Jordan–Hare Stadium • Auburn, Alabama

- Date: Saturday, September 11, 2021
- Game time: 11:03 a.m. CDT
- Game weather: Sunny • Temperature: 83 °F (28 °C) • Wind: SE 7 mph
- Game attendance: 82,745
- Referee: Steve Marlowe
- TV announcers (SEC Network): Dave Neal (play-by-play), Deuce McAllister (analyst), Andraya Carter (sideline reporter)
- Box Score

Statistics	ASU	AUB
First downs	11	22
Plays–yards	58–176	58–538
Rushes–yards	29–46	39–364
Passing yards	130	174
Passing: comp–att–int	19–29–1	11–19–0
Turnovers		
Time of possession	32:51	27:09

Team	Category	Player	Statistics
Alabama State	Passing	Ryan Nettles	19/27, 130 yds, 1 INT
Alabama State	Rushing	Jacory Merritt	10 carries, 17 yds
Alabama State	Receiving	Jeremiah Hixon	4 receptions, 46 yds
Auburn	Passing	Bo Nix	9/17, 108 yds, 2 TD
Auburn	Rushing	Jarquez Hunter	8 carries, 147 yds, 1 TD
Auburn	Receiving	Demetris Robertson	3 receptions, 61 yds, 2 TD

Scoring summary

Quarter	Time	Drive			Team	Scoring information	Score	
Quarter	Time	Plays	Yards	TOP	Team	Scoring information	Alabama State	Auburn
1	10:18	10	63	3:46	AUB	34-yard field goal by Anders Carlson	0	3
1	2:39	7	19	3:38	AUB	23-yard field goal by Anders Carlson	0	6
2	11:31	11	68	3:57	AUB	Demetris Robertson 28-yard touchdown reception from Bo Nix, Anders Carlson kick good	0	13
2	6:14	—	—	—	AUB	Nehemiah Pritchett 80 yd blocked field goal recovery, Anders Carlson kick good	0	20
3	12:01	4	90	2:09	AUB	Demetris Robertson 28-yard touchdown reception from Bo Nix, Anders Carlson kick good	0	27
3	9:07	1	36	0:17	AUB	Demetris Robertson 36-yard touchdown run, Anders Carlson kick good	0	34
3	6:25	—	—	—	AUB	Interception returned 35 yards for touchdown by Roger McCreary, Anders Carlson kick good	0	41
3	2:59	2	74	0:40	AUB	Malcolm Johnson Jr. 49-yard touchdown reception from T. J. Finley, Anders Carlson kick good	0	48
3	0:33	1	94	0:14	AUB	Jarquez Hunter 94-yard touchdown run, Anders Carlson kick good	0	55
4	5:44	13	63	7:42	AUB	Sean Jackson 4-yard touchdown run, Ben Patton kick good	0	62
"TOP" = time of possession. For other American football terms, see Glossary of American football.							0	62

=== At No. 10 Penn State ===
Game Three – No. 22 Auburn Tigers (2–0) at No. 10 Penn State Nittany Lions (2–0)

Quarter	1	2	3	4	Total
No. 22 Tigers	3	7	7	3	20
No. 10 Nittany Lions	7	7	7	7	28

at Beaver Stadium • State College, Pennsylvania

- Date: Saturday, September 18, 2021
- Game time: 6:45 p.m. CDT
- Game weather: Sunny • Temperature: 76 °F (24 °C) • Wind: NW 4 mph
- Game attendance: 109,958
- Referee: James Carter
- TV announcers (ABC): Chris Fowler (play-by-play), Kirk Herbstreit (analyst), Holly Rowe (sideline reporter)
- Box Score

Statistics	AUB	PSU
First downs	24	22
Plays–yards	79–367	66–396
Rushes–yards	182	94
Passing yards	185	302
Passing: comp–att–int	21–39–0	29–33–1
Turnovers		
Time of possession	31:42	28:18

Team	Category	Player	Statistics
Auburn	Passing	Bo Nix	21/37, 185 yds
Auburn	Rushing	Tank Bigsby	23 carries, 102 yds, 2 TD
Auburn	Receiving	Kobe Hudson	4 receptions, 66 yds
Penn State	Passing	Sean Clifford	28/32, 280 yds, 2 TD, 1 INT
Penn State	Rushing	Noah Cain	19 carries, 45 yds, 1 TD
Penn State	Receiving	Jahan Dotson	10 receptions, 78 yds, 1 TD

Scoring summary

Quarter	Time	Drive			Team	Scoring information	Score	
Quarter	Time	Plays	Yards	TOP	Team	Scoring information	Auburn	Penn State
1	9:37	6	28	2:37	AUB	45-yard field goal by Anders Carlson	3	0
1	2:24	6	88	2:33	PSU	Jahan Dotson 4-yard touchdown reception from Sean Clifford, Jordan Stout kick good	3	7
2	12:28	11	75	4:56	AUB	Tank Bigsby 4-yard touchdown run, Anders Carlson kick good	10	7
2	1:23	14	91	6:49	PSU	Brenton Strange 2-yard touchdown reception from Sean Clifford, Jordan Stout kick good	10	14
3	13:06	4	20	1:46	PSU	Tyler Warren 2-yard touchdown run, Jordan Stout kick good	10	21
3	5:52	15	75	7:14	AUB	Tank Bigsby 6-yard touchdown run, Anders Carlson kick good	17	21
4	14:55	9	31	3:02	AUB	43-yard field goal by Anders Carlson	20	21
4	10:48	9	75	4:07	PSU	Noah Cain 3-yard touchdown run, Jordan Stout kick good	20	28
"TOP" = time of possession. For other American football terms, see Glossary of American football.							20	28

=== Georgia State ===
Game Four – Georgia State Panthers (1–2) at No. 23 Auburn Tigers (2–1)

Quarter	1	2	3	4	Total
Panthers	3	21	0	0	24
No. 23 Tigers	6	6	7	15	34

at Jordan–Hare Stadium • Auburn, Alabama

- Date: Saturday, September 25, 2021
- Game time: 3:01 p.m. CDT
- Game weather: Sunny • Temperature: 79 °F (26 °C) • Wind: NW 6 mph
- Game attendance: 86,650
- Referee: Marc Curles
- TV announcers (SEC Network): Dave Neal (play-by-play), Deuce McAllister (analyst), Andraya Carter (sideline reporter)
- Box Score

Statistics	GSU	AUB
First downs	20	21
Plays–yards	71–384	78–419
Rushes–yards	47–267	35–166
Passing yards	117	253
Passing: comp–att–int	12–24–1	22–43–0
Turnovers		
Time of possession	29:37	30:23

Team	Category	Player	Statistics
Georgia State	Passing	Darren Grainger	12/24, 117 yds, 2 TD, 1 INT
Georgia State	Rushing	Tucker Gregg	12 carries, 150 yds, 1 TD
Georgia State	Receiving	Roger Carter	4 receptions, 51 yds, 1 TD
Auburn	Passing	Bo Nix	13/27, 156 yds
Auburn	Rushing	Jarquez Hunter	10 carries, 62 yds
Auburn	Receiving	Kobe Hudson	5 receptions, 76 yds

Scoring summary

Quarter	Time	Drive			Team	Scoring information	Score	
Quarter	Time	Plays	Yards	TOP	Team	Scoring information	Georgia State	Auburn
1	8:34	6	58	2:40	GSU	32-yard field goal by Noel Ruiz	3	0
1	7:34	4	5	0:50	AUB	40-yard field goal by Anders Carlson	3	3
1	2:57	10	65	3:50	AUB	23-yard field goal by Anders Carlson	3	6
2	12:45	15	75	5:12	GSU	Jamari Thrash 12-yard touchdown reception from Darren Grainger, Noel Ruiz kick good	10	6
2	9:00	9	66	3:39	AUB	27-yard field goal by Anders Carlson	10	9
2	7:29	5	75	1:31	GSU	Roger Carter 7-yard touchdown reception from Darren Grainger, Noel Ruiz kick good	17	9
2	2:54	11	49	4:27	AUB	45-yard field goal by Anders Carlson	17	12
2	1:56	4	60	0:58	GSU	Tucker Gregg 50-yard touchdown run, Noel Ruiz kick good	24	12
3	4:44	—	—	—	AUB	Barton Lester 0 yd blocked punt recovery, Anders Carlson kick good	24	19
4	0:45	13	98	2:38	AUB	Shedrick Jackson 10-yard touchdown reception from T. J. Finley, 2-point T. J. Finley pass to Kobe Hudson good	24	27
4	0:31	—	—	—	AUB	Interception returned 36 yards for touchdown by Smoke Monday, Anders Carlson kick good	24	34
"TOP" = time of possession. For other American football terms, see Glossary of American football.							24	34

=== At LSU ===
Game Five – No. 22 Auburn Tigers (3–1) at LSU Tigers (3–1)

Quarter	1	2	3	4	Total
No. 22 Auburn Tigers	0	10	0	14	24
LSU Tigers	7	6	6	0	19

at Tiger Stadium • Baton Rouge, Louisiana

- Date: Saturday, October 2, 2021
- Game time: 8:10 p.m. CDT
- Game weather: Sunny • Temperature: 72 °F (22 °C) • Wind: NE 3 mph
- Game attendance: 97,717
- Referee: Matt Loeffler
- TV announcers (ESPN): Joe Tessitore (play-by-play), Greg McElroy (analyst), Katie George (sideline reporter)
- Box Score

Statistics	AUB	LSU
First downs	23	19
Plays–yards	76–433	70–354
Rushes–yards	29–178	24–29
Passing yards	255	325
Passing: comp–att–int	23–47–0	26–46–1
Turnovers		
Time of possession	28:46	31:14

Team	Category	Player	Statistics
Auburn	Passing	Bo Nix	23/44, 255 yds, 1 TD
Auburn	Rushing	Jarquez Hunter	6 carries, 80 yds, 1 TD
Auburn	Receiving	Demetris Robertson	6 receptions, 60 yds
LSU	Passing	Max Johnson	26/46, 325 yds, 1 TD
LSU	Rushing	Corey Kiner	5 carries, 22 yds
LSU	Receiving	Jack Bech	7 receptions, 84 yds

Scoring summary

Quarter	Time	Drive			Team	Scoring information	Score	
Quarter	Time	Plays	Yards	TOP	Team	Scoring information	Auburn	LSU
1	6:33	8	91	5:25	LSU	Kayshon Boutte 31-yard touchdown reception from Max Johnson, Cade York kick good	0	7
2	13:35	10	52	3:37	LSU	33-yard field goal by Cade York	0	10
2	8:38	8	51	3:26	LSU	26-yard field goal by Cade York	0	13
2	4:53	10	75	3:45	AUB	Tyler Fromm 24-yard touchdown reception from Bo Nix, Anders Carlson kick good	7	13
2	0:14	13	62	3:05	AUB	49-yard field goal by Anders Carlson	10	13
3	11:00	11	40	4:00	LSU	22-yard field goal by Cade York	10	16
3	3:26	11	29	5:42	LSU	51-yard field goal by Cade York	10	19
4	14:16	9	75	4:10	AUB	Bo Nix 5-yard touchdown run, Anders Carlson kick good	17	19
4	3:11	11	92	3:55	AUB	Jarquez Hunter 1-yard touchdown run, Anders Carlson kick good	24	19
"TOP" = time of possession. For other American football terms, see Glossary of American football.							24	19

=== No. 2 Georgia ===
Game Six – No. 2 Georgia Bulldogs (5–0) at No. 18 Auburn Tigers (4–1)

Quarter	1	2	3	4	Total
No. 2 Bulldogs	3	14	7	10	34
No. 18 Tigers	3	0	7	0	10

at Jordan–Hare Stadium • Auburn, Alabama

- Date: Saturday, October 9, 2021
- Game time: 2:39 p.m. CDT
- Game weather: Sunny • Temperature: 81 °F (27 °C) • Wind: NE 6 mph
- Game attendance: 87,451
- Referee: Ken Williamson
- TV announcers (CBS): Noah Eagle (play-by-play), Rick Neuheisel and Aaron Murray (analysts), Jenny Dell (sideline reporter)
- Box Score

Statistics	UGA	AUB
First downs	22	17
Plays–yards	70–432	72–318
Rushes–yards	49–201	29–46
Passing yards	231	272
Passing: comp–att–int	14—21—0	24–43–1
Turnovers		
Time of possession	33:06	26:54

Team	Category	Player	Statistics
Georgia	Passing	Stetson Bennett	14/21, 231 yds, 2 Td
Georgia	Rushing	Zamir White	18 carries, 79 yds, 2 TD
Georgia	Receiving	Ladd McConkey	5 receptions, 135 yds, 1 TD
Auburn	Passing	Bo Nix	21/38, 217 yds
Auburn	Rushing	Tank Bigsby	10 carries, 28 yds, 1 TD
Auburn	Receiving	Kobe Hudson	5 receptions, 50 yds

Scoring summary

Quarter	Time	Drive			Team	Scoring information	Score	
Quarter	Time	Plays	Yards	TOP	Team	Scoring information	Georgia	Auburn
1	8:19	17	68	6:41	AUB	24-yard field goal by Anders Carlson	0	3
1	2:55	6	21	2:19	UGA	23-yard field goal by Jack Podlesny	3	3
2	14:39	7	70	1:35	UGA	Zamir White 1-yard touchdown run, Jack Podlesny kick good	10	3
2	9:10	6	78	2:50	UGA	Adonai Mitchell 3-yard touchdown reception from Stetson Bennett, Jack Podlesny kick good	17	3
3	6:01	1	60	0:09	UGA	Ladd McConkey 60-yard touchdown reception from Stetson Bennett, Jack Podlesny kick good	24	3
3	4:01	6	78	1:53	AUB	Tank Bigsby 6-yard touchdown run, Anders Carlson kick good	24	10
4	14:52	10	71	4:09	UGA	21-yard field goal by Jack Podlesny	27	10
4	7:11	10	64	5:46	UGA	Zamir White 10-yard touchdown run, Jack Podlesny kick good	34	10
"TOP" = time of possession. For other American football terms, see Glossary of American football.							34	10

=== At No. 17 Arkansas ===
Game Seven – Auburn Tigers (4–2) at No. 17 Arkansas Razorbacks (4–2)

Quarter	1	2	3	4	Total
Tigers	7	7	14	10	38
No. 17 Razorbacks	3	7	13	0	23

at Donald W. Reynolds Razorback Stadium • Fayetteville, Arkansas

- Date: Saturday, October 16, 2021
- Game time: 11:08 a.m. CDT
- Game weather: Sunny • Temperature: 53 °F (12 °C) • Wind: NW 5 mph
- Game attendance: 73,370
- Referee: Lee Hedrick
- TV announcers (CBS): Noah Eagle (play-by-play), Rick Neuheisel and Aaron Murray (analysts), Jenny Dell (sideline reporter)
- Box Score

Statistics	AUB	ARK
First downs	20	29
Plays–yards	61–427	89–460
Rushes–yards	35–135	54–232
Passing yards	292	228
Passing: comp–att–int	21–26–1	21–35–0
Turnovers		
Time of possession	30:03	29:57

Team	Category	Player	Statistics
Auburn	Passing	Bo Nix	21/26, 292 yds, 2 TD, 1 INT
Auburn	Rushing	Tank Bigsby	18 carries, 68 yds, 1 TD
Auburn	Receiving	Shedrick Jackson	5 receptions, 61 yds
Arkansas	Passing	KJ Jefferson	21/35, 228 yds, 2 TD
Arkansas	Rushing	KJ Jefferson	18 carries, 66 yds
Arkansas	Receiving	Treylon Burks	9 receptions, 109 yds, 2 TD

Scoring summary

Quarter	Time	Drive			Team	Scoring information	Score	
Quarter	Time	Plays	Yards	TOP	Team	Scoring information	Auburn	Arkansas
1	12:16	6	75	2:44	AUB	Ja'Varrius Johnson 39-yard touchdown reception from Bo Nix, Anders Carlson kick good	7	0
1	7:37	11	49	4:39	ARK	44-yard field goal by Cam Little	7	3
2	9:59	9	65	4:18	AUB	Tank Bigsby 1-yard touchdown run, Anders Carlson kick good	14	3
2	0:18	12	84	2:35	ARK	Treylon Burks 11-yard touchdown reception from KJ Jefferson, Cam Little kick good	14	10
3	12:30	6	75	2:30	ARK	Treylon Burks 30-yard touchdown reception from KJ Jefferson, Cam Little kick good	14	17
3	7:19	–	–	–	AUB	Marcus Harris 0 yd fumble recovery, Anders Carlson kick good	21	17
3	4:16	1	71	0:11	AUB	Demetris Robertson 71-yard touchdown reception from Bo Nix, Anders Carlson kick good	28	17
3	0:00	13	75	4:16	ARK	Dominique Johnson 10-yard touchdown run, 2-point pass by KJ Jefferson failed	28	23
4	10:35	9	63	4:25	AUB	29-yard field goal by Anders Carlson	31	23
4	2:30	12	75	6:11	AUB	Bo Nix 23-yard touchdown run, Anders Carlson kick good	38	23
"TOP" = time of possession. For other American football terms, see Glossary of American football.							38	23

=== No. 10 Ole Miss ===
Game Eight – No. 10 Ole Miss Rebels (6–1) at No. 18 Auburn Tigers (5–2)

Quarter	1	2	3	4	Total
No. 10 Rebels	3	14	3	0	20
No. 18 Tigers	14	14	0	3	31

at Jordan–Hare Stadium • Auburn, Alabama

- Date: Saturday, October 30, 2021
- Game time: 6:05 p.m. CDT
- Game weather: Cloudy • Temperature: 55 °F (13 °C) • Wind: W 9 mph
- Game attendance: 87,451
- Referee: Ken Williamson
- TV announcers (ESPN): Sean McDonough (play-by-play), Todd Blackledge (analyst), Molly McGrath (sideline reporter)
- Box Score

Statistics	MISS	AUB
First downs	26	30
Plays–yards	81–464	77–483
Rushes–yards	39–157	46–207
Passing yards	307	276
Passing: comp–att–int	26–42–1	22–31–0
Turnovers		
Time of possession	26:35	33:25

Team	Category	Player	Statistics
Ole Miss	Passing	Matt Corral	21/37, 289 yds, 1 INT
Ole Miss	Rushing	Henry Parrish Jr.	12 carries, 57 yds
Ole Miss	Receiving	Jahcour Pearson	7 receptions, 135 yds
Auburn	Passing	Bo Nix	22/30, 276 yds, 1 TD
Auburn	Rushing	Tank Bigsby	23 carries, 140 yds, 1 TD
Auburn	Receiving	Kobe Hudson	6 receptions, 79 yds

Scoring summary

Quarter	Time	Drive			Team	Scoring information	Score	
Quarter	Time	Plays	Yards	TOP	Team	Scoring information	Ole Miss	Auburn
1	10:11	11	82	4:45	AUB	Bo Nix 11-yard touchdown run, Anders Carlson kick good	0	7
1	6:31	12	61	3:35	MISS	29-yard field goal by Caden Costa	3	7
1	1:49	10	72	4:37	AUB	Tank Bigsby 1-yard touchdown run, Anders Carlson kick good	3	14
2	8:19	15	8	5:25	MISS	Snoop Conner 13-yard touchdown run, Caden Costa kick good	10	14
2	6:20	5	77	1:49	AUB	Bo Nix 7-yard touchdown run, Anders Carlson kick good	10	21
2	2:42	10	75	3:38	MISS	Matt Corral 11-yard touchdown run, Caden Costa kick good	17	21
2	0:11	11	69	2:22	AUB	Jarquez Hunter 9-yard touchdown reception from Bo Nix, Anders Carlson kick good	17	28
3	6:31	7	42	1:28	MISS	49-yard field goal by Caden Costa	20	28
4	10:52	11	76	5:16	AUB	28-yard field goal by Anders Carlson	20	31
"TOP" = time of possession. For other American football terms, see Glossary of American football.							20	31

=== At No. 14 Texas A&M ===
Game Nine – No. 13 Auburn Tigers (6–2) at No. 14 Texas A&M Aggies (6–2)

Quarter	1	2	3	4	Total
No. 13 Tigers	3	0	0	0	3
No. 14 Aggies	3	0	3	14	20

at Kyle Field • College Station, Texas

- Date: Saturday, November 6, 2021
- Game time: 2:39 p.m. CDT
- Game weather: Sunny • Temperature: • Wind: N 6 mph
- Game attendance: 109,835
- Referee: James Carter
- TV announcers (CBS): Brad Nessler (play-by-play), Gary Danielson (analyst), Jamie Erdahl (sideline reporter)
- Box Score

Statistics	AUB	TA&M
First downs	17	18
Plays–yards	70—226	64—409
Rushes–yards	29—73	35—217
Passing yards	153	192
Passing: comp–att–int	20—41—1	15—29—0
Turnovers		
Time of possession	29:56	30:00

Team	Category	Player	Statistics
Auburn	Passing	Bo Nix	20/41, 153 yds, 1 INT
Auburn	Rushing	Tank Bigsby	15 carries, 69 yds
Auburn	Receiving	Shaun Shivers	6 receptions, 40 yds
Texas A&M	Passing	Zach Calzada	15/29, 192 yds
Texas A&M	Rushing	Isaiah Spiller	21 carries, 112 yds
Texas A&M	Receiving	Jalen Wydermyer	5 receptions, 53 yds

Scoring summary

Quarter	Time	Drive			Team	Scoring information	Score	
Quarter	Time	Plays	Yards	TOP	Team	Scoring information	Auburn	Texas A&M
1	7:12	14	80	5:21	TA&M	21-yard field goal by Seth Small	0	3
1	0:20	14	60	6:52	AUB	32-yard field goal by Anders Carlson	3	3
3	3:39	10	68	5:37	TA&M	29-yard field goal by Seth Small	3	6
4	13:40	9	58	3:18	TA&M	47-yard field goal by Seth Small	3	9
4	13:04	—	—	—	TA&M	Micheal Clemons 24 yd fumble return, 2-point pass to Ainias Smith good	3	17
4	3:15	7	26	3:35	TA&M	37-yard field goal by Seth Small	3	20
"TOP" = time of possession. For other American football terms, see Glossary of American football.							3	20

=== Mississippi State ===
Game Ten – Mississippi State Bulldogs (5–4) at No. 17 Auburn Tigers (6–3)

Quarter	1	2	3	4	Total
Bulldogs	3	7	13	20	43
No. 17 Tigers	14	14	0	6	34

at Jordan–Hare Stadium • Auburn, Alabama

- Date: Saturday, November 13, 2021
- Game time: 11:07 a.m. CST
- Game weather: Sunny • Temperature: 55 °F (13 °C) • Wind: NW 10 mph
- Game attendance: 87,451
- Referee: Steve Marlowe
- TV announcers (ESPN): Bob Wischusen (play-by-play), Jordan Rodgers (analyst), Kris Budden (sideline reporter)
- Box Score

Statistics	MSU	AUB
First downs	31	22
Plays–yards	75—487	70—483
Rushes–yards	19—72	27—106
Passing yards	415	377
Passing: comp–att–int	44—56—0	27—43—0
Turnovers		
Time of possession	35:01	24:59

Team	Category	Player	Statistics
Mississippi State	Passing	Will Rogers	44/55, 415 yds, 6 TD
Mississippi State	Rushing	Dillon Johnson	8 carries, 62 yds
Mississippi State	Receiving	Jaden Walley	7 receptions, 87 yds
Auburn	Passing	Bo Nix	27/41, 377 yds, 2 TD
Auburn	Rushing	Ja'Varrius Johnson	1 carry, 57 yds, 1 TD
Auburn	Receiving	Kobe Hudson	8 receptions, 107 yds, 1 TD

Scoring summary

Quarter	Time	Drive			Team	Scoring information	Score	
Quarter	Time	Plays	Yards	TOP	Team	Scoring information	Mississippi State	Auburn
1	12:37	5	67	2:17	AUB	Tank Bigsby 5-yard touchdown run, Anders Carlson kick good	0	7
1	7:21	14	49	5:16	MSU	34-yard field goal by Nolan McCord	3	7
1	4:26	6	82	2:47	AUB	Ja'Varrius Johnson 57-yard touchdown run, Anders Carlson kick good	3	14
2	11:59	11	66	4:38	AUB	Luke Deal 4-yard touchdown reception from Bo Nix, Anders Carlson kick good	3	21
2	6:10	8	68	3:37	AUB	Kobe Hudson 15-yard touchdown reception from Bo Nix, Anders Carlson kick good	3	28
2	1:55	10	75	4:15	MSU	Makai Polk 4-yard touchdown reception from Will Rogers, Nolan McCord kick good	10	28
3	11:25	7	75	3:35	MSU	Jamire Calvin 3-yard touchdown reception from Will Rogers, Nolan McCord kick good	17	28
3	4:28	10	98	5:06	MSU	Dillon Johnson 3-yard touchdown reception from Will Rogers, 2-point pass failed	23	28
4	13:28	6	72	2:45	MSU	Makai Polk 6-yard touchdown reception from Will Rogers, 2-point run failed	29	28
4	9:35	5	55	2:30	MSU	Jamire Calvin 3-yard touchdown reception from Will Rogers, Nolan McCord kick good	36	28
4	5:31	4	45	2:59	MSU	Malik Heath 6-yard touchdown reception from Will Rogers, Nolan McCord kick good	43	28
4	3:37	9	90	1:47	AUB	Tank Bigsby 1-yard touchdown run, 2-point pass failed	43	34
"TOP" = time of possession. For other American football terms, see Glossary of American football.							43	34

=== At South Carolina ===
Game Eleven – Auburn Tigers (6–4) at South Carolina Gamecocks (5–5)

Quarter	1	2	3	4	Total
Tigers	14	0	3	0	17
Gamecocks	0	14	7	0	21

at Williams–Brice Stadium • Columbia, South Carolina

- Date: Saturday, November 20, 2021
- Game time: 6:06 p.m. CST
- Game weather: Sunny • Temperature: 48 °F (9 °C) • Wind: NE 2 mph
- Game attendance: 70,299
- Referee: Ken Williamson
- TV announcers (ESPN): Mark Jones (play-by-play), Robert Griffin III (analyst), Quint Kessenich (sideline reporter)
- Box Score

Statistics	AUB	SC
First downs	27	20
Plays–yards	65—379	56—306
Rushes–yards	33—191	41—149
Passing yards	188	157
Passing: comp–att–int	17—32—0	10—15—1
Turnovers		
Time of possession	29:25	30:35

Team	Category	Player	Statistics
Auburn	Passing	T. J. Finley	17/32, 188 yds, 1 TD
Auburn	Rushing	Tank Bigsby	22 carries, 164 yds, 1 TD
Auburn	Receiving	Shedrick Jackson	7 receptions, 111 yds
South Carolina	Passing	Jason Brown	10/15, 157 yds, 3 TD, 1 INT
South Carolina	Rushing	ZaQuandre White	16 carries, 99 yds
South Carolina	Receiving	ZaQuandre White	3 receptions, 69 yds, 1 TD

Scoring summary

Quarter	Time	Drive			Team	Scoring information	Score	
Quarter	Time	Plays	Yards	TOP	Team	Scoring information	Auburn	South Carolina
1	8:45	6	49	2:25	AUB	Demetris Robertson 10-yard touchdown reception from T. J. Finley, Ben Patton kick good	7	0
1	2:37	7	61	3:18	AUB	Tank Bigsby 7-yard touchdown run, Ben Patton kick good	14	0
2	6:15	10	67	5:06	SC	ZaQuandre White 7-yard touchdown reception from Jason Brown, Parker White kick good	14	7
2	0:24	6	35	2:37	SC	Trai Jones 3-yard touchdown reception from Jason Brown, Parker White kick good	14	14
3	8:40	9	63	4:17	AUB	37-yard field goal by Ben Patton	17	14
3	4:57	6	67	3:37	SC	Josh Vann 7-yard touchdown reception from Jason Brown, Parker White kick good	17	21
"TOP" = time of possession. For other American football terms, see Glossary of American football.								

=== No. 3 Alabama ===
Game Twelve – No. 3 Alabama Crimson Tide (10-1) at Auburn Tigers (6-5)

Quarter	1	2	3	4	OT	2OT	3OT	4OT	Total
No. 3 Crimson Tide	0	0	0	10	7	3	2	2	24
Tigers	0	7	3	0	7	3	2	0	22

at Jordan–Hare Stadium • Auburn, Alabama

- Date: Saturday, November 27, 2021
- Game time: 2:39 p.m. CST
- Game weather: Sunny • Temperature: 63 °F (17 °C) • Wind: SW 4 mph
- Game attendance: 87,451
- Referee: Alex Moore
- TV announcers (CBS): Brad Nessler (play-by-play), Gary Danielson (analyst), Jamie Erdahl (sideline reporter)
- Box Score

Statistics	ALA	AUB
First downs	18	12
Plays–yards	89—388	66—159
Rushes–yards	37—71	40—22
Passing yards	317	137
Passing: comp–att–int	25—52—1	17—26—1
Turnovers		
Time of possession	29:24	30:36

Team	Category	Player	Statistics
Alabama	Passing	Bryce Young	25/51, 317 yds, 2 TD, 1 INT
Alabama	Rushing	Brian Robinson Jr.	16 carries, 71 yds
Alabama	Receiving	John Metchie III	13 receptions, 150 yds
Auburn	Passing	T. J. Finley	17/26, 137 yds, 2 TD, 1 INT
Auburn	Rushing	Tank Bigsby	29 carries, 63 yds
Auburn	Receiving	Demetris Robertson	3 receptions, 39 yds

Scoring summary

Quarter	Time	Drive			Team	Scoring information	Score	
Quarter	Time	Plays	Yards	TOP	Team	Scoring information	Alabama	Auburn
2	6:50	4	39	2:12	AUB	Kobe Hudson 15-yard touchdown reception from T. J. Finley, Ben Patton kick good	0	7
3	11:43	4	5	1:30	AUB	33-yard field goal by Ben Patton	0	10
4	8:44	7	46	3:06	ALA	30-yard field goal by Will Reichard	3	10
4	0:24	12	97	1:11	ALA	Ja'Corey Brooks 28-yard touchdown reception from Bryce Young, Will Reichard kick good	10	10
OT		5	25		ALA	Slade Bolden 6-yard touchdown reception from Bryce Young, Will Reichard kick good	17	10
OT		6	25		AUB	Landen King 5-yard touchdown reception from T. J. Finley, Ben Patton kick good	17	17
2OT		4	-7		AUB	49-yard field goal by Ben Patton	17	20
2OT		4	5		ALA	38-yard field goal by Will Reichard	20	20
3OT		0	0		ALA	John Metchie 2-point pass reception from Bryce Young good	22	20
3OT		0	0		AUB	John Samuel Shenker 2-point pass reception from T. J. Finley good	22	22
4OT		0	0		ALA	John Metchie 2-point pass reception from Bryce Young good	24	22
"TOP" = time of possession. For other American football terms, see Glossary of American football.							24	22

=== No. 20 Houston (Birmingham Bowl) ===
Birmingham Bowl – Auburn Tigers (6-6) vs. No. 20 Houston Cougars (11-2)

Quarter	1	2	3	4	Total
No. 20 Cougars	7	3	0	7	17
Tigers	0	3	10	0	13

at Protective Stadium • Birmingham, Alabama

- Date: Tuesday, December 28, 2021
- Game time: 11:04 a.m. CST
- Game weather: Sunny • Temperature: 65 °F (18 °C)
- Game attendance: 47,100
- Referee: Michael Mothershed
- TV announcers (ESPN): Taylor Zarzour (play-by-play), Eric Mac Lain (analyst), and Taylor Davis (sideline)
- Box Score

Statistics	HOU	AUB
First downs	19	15
Plays–yards	67—398	66—352
Rushes–yards	26—115	29—125
Passing yards	283	227
Passing: comp–att–int	26—41—2	19—37—0
Turnovers		
Time of possession	29:50	30:10

Team	Category	Player	Statistics
Houston	Passing	Clayton Tune	26/40, 283 yds, 2 TD, 1 INT
Houston	Rushing	Alton McCaskill	14 carries, 78 yds
Houston	Receiving	Nathaniel Dell	10 receptions, 150 yds
Auburn	Passing	T. J. Finley	19/37, 227 yds, 1 TD
Auburn	Rushing	Tank Bigsby	16 carries, 96 yds
Auburn	Receiving	Tank Bigsby	5 receptions, 68 yds

Scoring summary

Quarter	Time	Drive			Team	Scoring information	Score	
Quarter	Time	Plays	Yards	TOP	Team	Scoring information	Houston	Auburn
1	8:46	12	87	6:11	HOU	Alton McCaskill 5-yard touchdown reception from Clayton Tune, Dalton Witherspoon kick good	7	0
2	6:58	9	45	4:10	HOU	52-yard field goal by Dalton Witherspoon	10	0
2	3:10	8	67	3:42	AUB	27-yard field goal by Ben Patton	10	3
3	12:12	7	57	2:48	AUB	35-yard field goal by Ben Patton	10	6
3	3:52	11	78	6:20	AUB	Kobe Hudson 12-yard touchdown reception from T. J. Finley, Ben Patton kick good	10	13
4	3:27	8	80	3:20	HOU	Jake Herslow 26-yard touchdown reception from Clayton Tune, Dalton Witherspoon kick good	17	13
"TOP" = time of possession. For other American football terms, see Glossary of American football.							17	13

== Rankings ==
Ranking movements Legend: ██ Increase in ranking ██ Decrease in ranking — = Not ranked RV = Received votes
	Week															
Poll	Pre	1	2	3	4	5	6	7	8	9	10	11	12	13	14	Final
AP	RV	25	22	23	22	18	RV	19	18	12	16	RV	—	—	—	
Coaches	RV	RV	20	23	22	19	RV	22	21	14	20	RV	—	—	—	
CFP	Not released									13	17	—	—	—	—	Not released
