= Reid Bauer =

American football player (born 1999)

No. 30
- Position: Punter

Personal information
- Born: September 7, 1999 (age 27); Magnolia, Texas, U.S.
- Listed height: 5 ft 11 in (1.80 m)
- Listed weight: 206 lb (93 kg)

Career information
- High school: Magnolia (Magnolia, Texas)
- College: Arkansas (2018–2022); Memphis (2023)

Awards and highlights
- Peter Mortell Holder of the Year Award (2021)
- Stats at ESPN

Reid Bauer (born September 7, 1999) is an American former college football punter. He played for the Arkansas Razorbacks and the Memphis Tigers. He was awarded the college football 2021 Peter Mortell Holder of the Year Award.

== Early life ==
Bauer attended Magnolia High School in Magnolia, Texas. He averaged 41.3 yards per punt during his senior year while being named All State Honorable Mention Punter. He also played outside linebacker, achieving 83 total tackles over his high school career. He earned a five-star rating by Kohl's Kicking and was ranked as the number 14 punter in the nation. Bauer committed to the University of Arkansas as a preferred walk-on to play college football.

== College career ==
=== Arkansas ===
During Bauer's true freshman season in 2018, he played in all 12 games and finished the season with punting 56 times for 2,176 yards, averaging 38.9 yards per punt, which was the highest yardage by a Razorback specialist since 2016. As a sophomore in 2019, Bauer played in two games and finished the season with punting three times for 110 yards, averaging 36.7 yards per punt, allowing him to gain a redshirt. As a redshirt sophomore in 2020, Bauer played in nine games and finished the season with punting a team-high 39 times with 1,698 yards, averaging 43.5 yards per punt.

As a redshirt junior in 2021, Bauer played in all 13 games. This time while also serving as the holder while still performing his punting duties. He finished the season with averaging 43.3 yards per punt on 58 punts for 2,510 yards. Against LSU on November 13, Bauer had a 23 yard run for a first down on a fake field goal attempt. The next week, against top-ranked Alabama, Bauer completed a 32-yard touchdown pass on a fake field goal. He was awarded the Peter Mortell Holder of the Year Award, given to the nation's top holder voted on a by a committee that includes Peter Mortell, who the award is named after. The winner of the award helps endorse a charity of his choosing. For this, Bauer chose to endorse Boys & Girls Club of Northwest Arkansas.

As a redshirt senior in 2022, Bauer played in 12 games and finished the season with punting 23 times for 1,025 yards, averaging 44.6 yards per punt. He continued to serve as the team's primary holder.

Using his extra year of eligibility, Bauer decided to transfer from Arkansas. On December 19, 2022, Bauer committed to play football for the Memphis Tigers.

=== Memphis ===
Prior to the 2023 season, Bauer was named to the Ray Guy Award Preseason Watchlist. During the season, he punted 40 times for 1,755 yards, averaging 43.9 yards per punt.
