= The New Schools at Carver =

High school in Georgia, United States

Coordinates: 33°43′07″N 84°23′23″W

Location
- 55 McDonough Blvd; Atlanta, Georgia

Information
- Type: Public
- School district: Atlanta Public Schools
- NCES District ID: 130012003540
- Teaching staff: 56.60 FTE (2024-2025)
- Grades: 9 to 12
- Enrollment: 514 (2024-2025)
- Student to teacher ratio: 9.08 (2024-2025)
- Website: carver.atlantapublicschools.us

Carver Early College (formerly The New Schools at Carver) is a high school in Atlanta, Georgia, United States. It was established as George Washington Carver Comprehensive High School and is part of Atlanta Public Schools. Carver has four smaller academic programs: Early College, Technology, Performing Arts, Entrepreneurship, and Health Science and Research.

The main building on the campus is Leete Hall designed by Alexander Hamilton and Henry White Jr. In 1922 it was the campus of Clark University and Gammon College. The colleges moved out of South Atlanta in 1941. In 2005, the school reopened under the current format.

== Notable alumni ==
- Otis Grant (1979), former NFL wide receiver
- Christopher Bailey (2018), track and field athlete
- Smoke Monday (2018), former NFL safety
- Woody Marks (2020), running back for the Houston Texans
