= Otis Grant (American football) =

American football player (1961–2011)

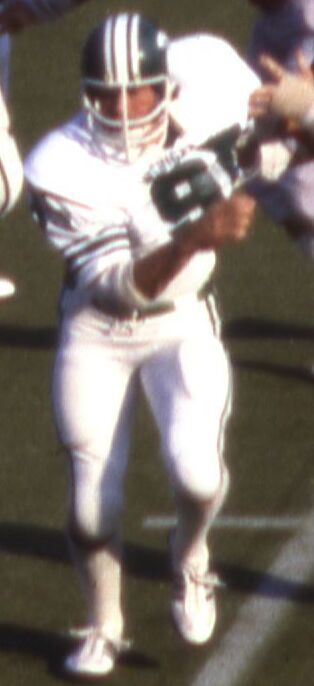
- Grant playing for the Michigan State Spartans in 1979

No. 82, 81
- Position: Wide receiver

Personal information
- Born: August 13, 1961; Atlanta, Georgia, U.S.
- Died: May 29, 2011 (aged 49); Roswell, Georgia, U.S.
- Listed height: 6 ft 3 in (1.91 m)
- Listed weight: 197 lb (89 kg)

Career information
- High school: Carver (Atlanta)
- College: Michigan State
- NFL draft: 1983: 5th round, 134th overall pick

Career history
- Los Angeles Rams (1983–1985); Detroit Lions (1986)*; New York Jets (1987)*; Philadelphia Eagles (1987)
- * Offseason or practice squad member only

Career NFL statistics
- Receptions: 37
- Receiving yards: 565
- Touchdowns: 1
- Stats at Pro Football Reference

Otis Grant (August 13, 1961 – May 29, 2011) was an American professional football wide receiver who played three seasons in the National Football League (NFL). He played college football for the Michigan State Spartans and was selected by the Los Angeles Rams in the fifth round of the 1983 NFL draft. He also played for the Philadelphia Eagles.

== Biography ==
Otis Grant was born on August 13, 1961, in Atlanta, Georgia. He attended George Washington Carver High School in Atlanta. Grant played for the Michigan State Spartans from 1979 to 1982, recording 1,358 yards and twelve touchdowns on 79 receptions.

Grant was selected in the fifth round by the Los Angeles Rams with the 134th overall pick in the 1983 NFL draft. He played in 30 games, starting three, for the Rams from 1983 to 1984. He was released by the Rams on August 27, 1985.

Grant played in three games, all starts, as a replacement player for the Philadelphia Eagles during the 1987 NFL players' strike. Grant worked in various areas, including security and as a marketing manager, after retiring from football.
