= Peter Mortell Holder of the Year Award =

Informal college football award

- Awarded for: Best holder in college football.
- Presented by: HOTY Foundation (2015–2022)

The Peter Mortell Holder of the Year Award (or HOTY) was a tongue-in-cheek, informal award given to the top holder in college football in the United States.

== History ==
The award was created in 2015 by its first recipient, Peter Mortell. At the time, Mortell was a punter in his senior year for the Minnesota Golden Gophers. During his career at Minnesota, Mortell handled all punting and holding duties over three seasons. His career included 203 punts with an average of 44 yards (40 m) per punt, ranking him first in team history. Off the field, Mortell, as well as other specialists at Minnesota and around the Big Ten Conference, was known for his sense of humor, which contributed to the award's parodic nature. The comedic nature of the award garnered national attention, and his acceptance video was included by ESPN in its annual award show for college football position awards.

== Winners ==
Each year's finalists and winner were selected by the award's foundation, which was run by Mortell. For the winner, a foundation is set up to help raise money for a charity of his choosing. As the inaugural winner, Mortell raised approximately $30,000 for the University of Minnesota Children's Hospital. Additionally, each winner recorded a comedic acceptance video which was shown during ESPN's award show.

Year	Winner	Position	Team	Charity	Ref.
2015	Peter Mortell	P, H	Minnesota	UMN Children's Hospital	
2016	Garrett Moores	QB, H	Michigan	VA of Ann Arbor	
2017	Connor McGinnis	QB, H	Oklahoma	Fields & Futures Foundation (OKC)	
2018	Mac Loudermilk	P, H	UCF	St. Jude Children's Research Hospital	
2019	Preston Brady	LS, H	Memphis	St. Jude Children's Research Hospital	
2020	Spencer Jones	WR, H	Oklahoma	Boys & Girls Club of Norman	
2021	Reid Bauer	P, H	Arkansas	Boys & Girls Club of Northwest Arkansas	
2022	Noah White	H	Louisiana Tech	Project 319	
