= Holder (gridiron football) =

American football position

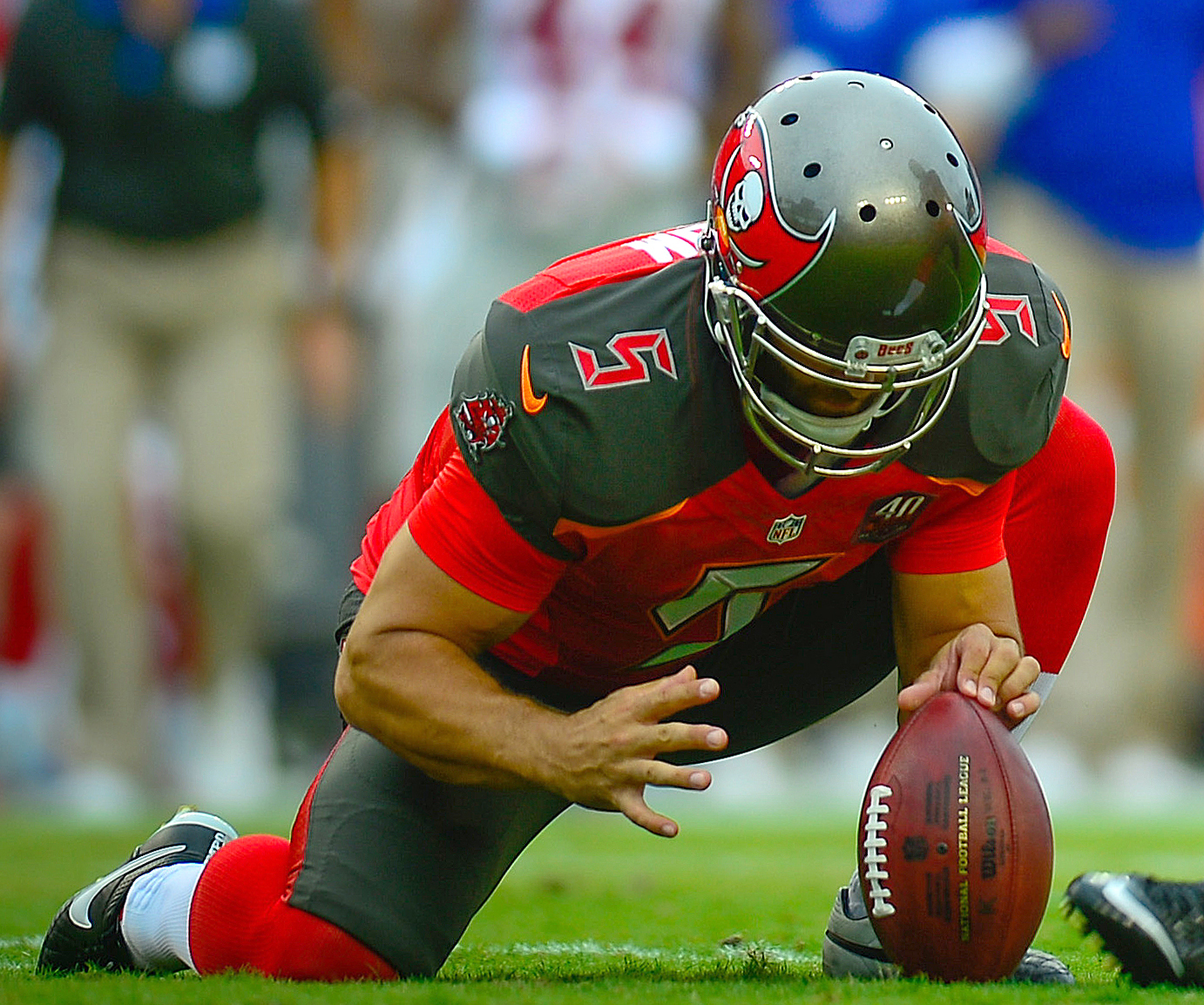
Jake Schum of the Tampa Bay Buccaneers holding for a field goal attempt in 2015.

In gridiron football, the holder is the player who receives the snap from the long snapper during field goal or extra point attempts made by the placekicker. The holder is set on one knee seven yards behind the line-of-scrimmage. Before the play begins, the holder places the hand which is closest to the placekicker on the ground in a location designated by the kicker's foot, with their forward hand ready to receive the snap (in high school games, the holder/kicker combo is responsible for a kicking block, which lifts the ball off the turf). After receiving the snap, the holder will place the football on the turf, or block, ideally with the laces facing the uprights and the ball accurately placed where the backhand was initially, then balancing the ball with one or two fingers until the ball is kicked.

For the kick to be successful, the holder needs to do more than just place the ball on the ground. Before the snap, the kicker will approach and will mark a certain spot, and will then take steps backward to prepare for the kick. When the ball snaps, the holder is responsible for making sure that the ball is placed directly on that spot, the laces of the football are facing outward to produce better contact with the football, and that it is leaning in the direction that the kicker has specified.

The holder, like the placekicker and the long snapper, is protected from intentional contact from the opposing team. The penalty for roughing the holder is 15 yards and an automatic first down.

== Depth chart position ==
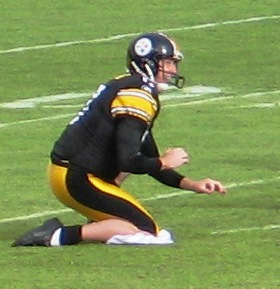
Mitch Berger as a holder with the snap on the way

Compared to other American football positions, the holder is one of the most trivial positions, requiring precision in the receipt of a snap and placement of a ball in a short time, but requiring far less physical talent than a skill position and much less bulk or strength than a lineman. Each NFL team is only allowed to have 53 players active on their roster (only 46 active on the gameday roster). Because of this, it is exceptionally rare for a team to reserve a roster spot solely for a placekick holder; most teams will instead use a player who plays another position to double as the holder. One notable exception was Patricia Palinkas, the first woman to have played American football professionally in a predominantly male league; Palinkas played holder (and no other position) during her short time as a pro player.

On most teams, the holder is either the team's punter or the backup quarterback. Some high school football teams will place a wide receiver or running back at the holder position because of their good hands (this is not unheard of at other levels; Steve Tasker, a wide receiver and punt gunner, also played holder at various times in his NFL career, as does his son Luke Tasker, also a wide receiver. Others include tight end Jay Novacek, and safeties Paul Krause and Keith Lyle).

=== Punter ===
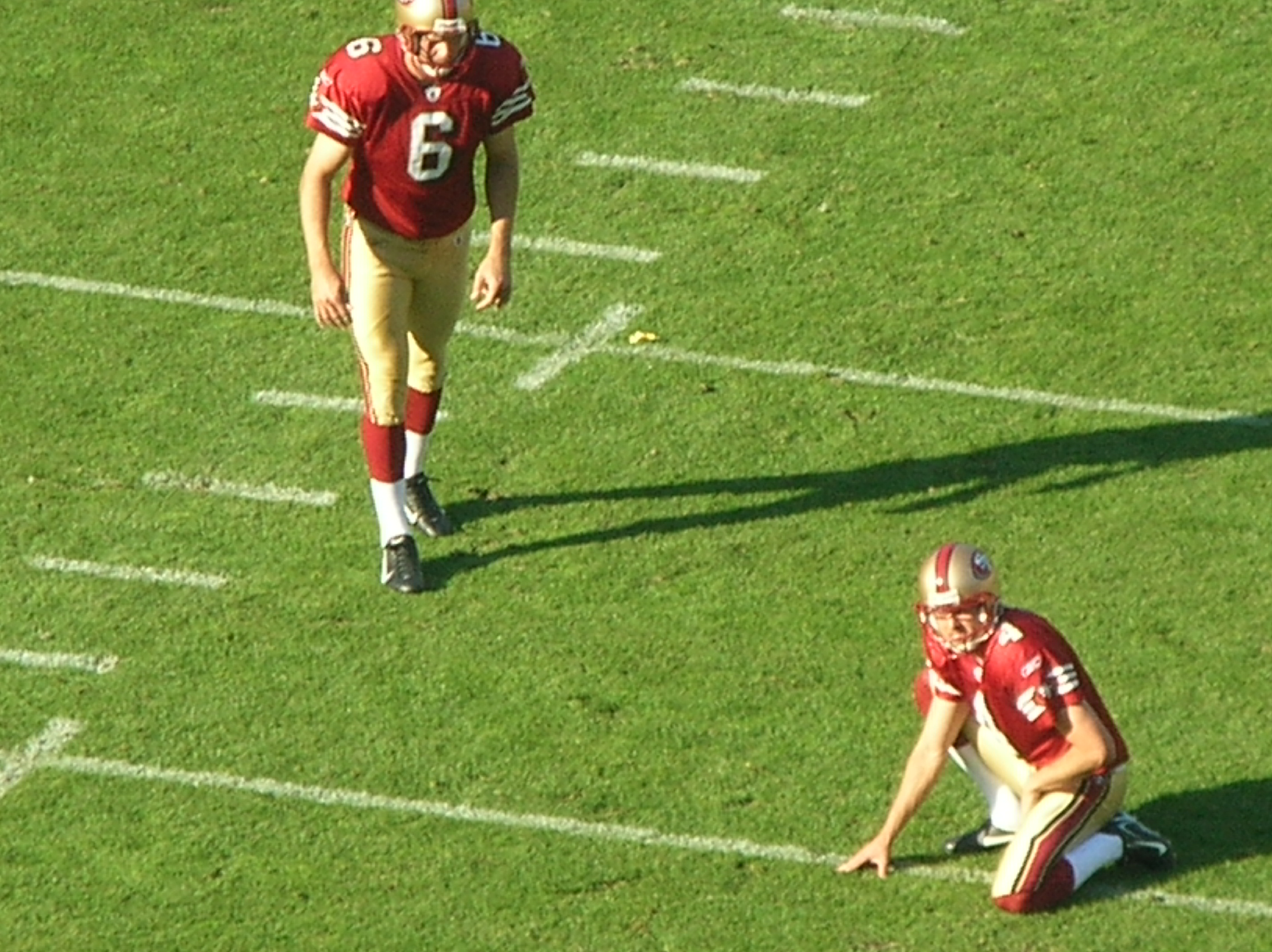
San Francisco 49ers kicker Joe Nedney prepares to kick an extra point with punter Andy Lee as the holder, 2008

In today's NFL, most teams use their punter as a holder. New England Patriots' head coach Bill Belichick explained that punters are generally holders for the reason that punters and kickers usually have more time together to game plan, watch film, and are able to have more reps during practice than a player who has to play another position. Additionally, punters are already accustomed to handling snaps from the long snapper.

=== Backup quarterback ===
The rationale for having a backup quarterback holding is that the quarterback is accustomed to receiving snaps from the center and long snaps from the shotgun formation. The quarterback also provides a threat for a fake field goal since the quarterback can throw a pass on such plays. Additionally, in the event of a bad snap and an aborted kick attempt, the holder might have to become the quarterback for the play, so having an actual quarterback helps in that regard. Before the 2010s, in the NFL, backup quarterbacks generally held for field goal kicks. However, such usage has remained rather common in collegiate football. Many times a quarterback who was a redshirt freshman will serve as the holder their sophomore year. It is also common in other professional leagues such as the Arena Football League (where there is no punting and are thus no punters) or the Canadian Football League, where roster size restrictions generally result in one person serving as both placekicker and punter.

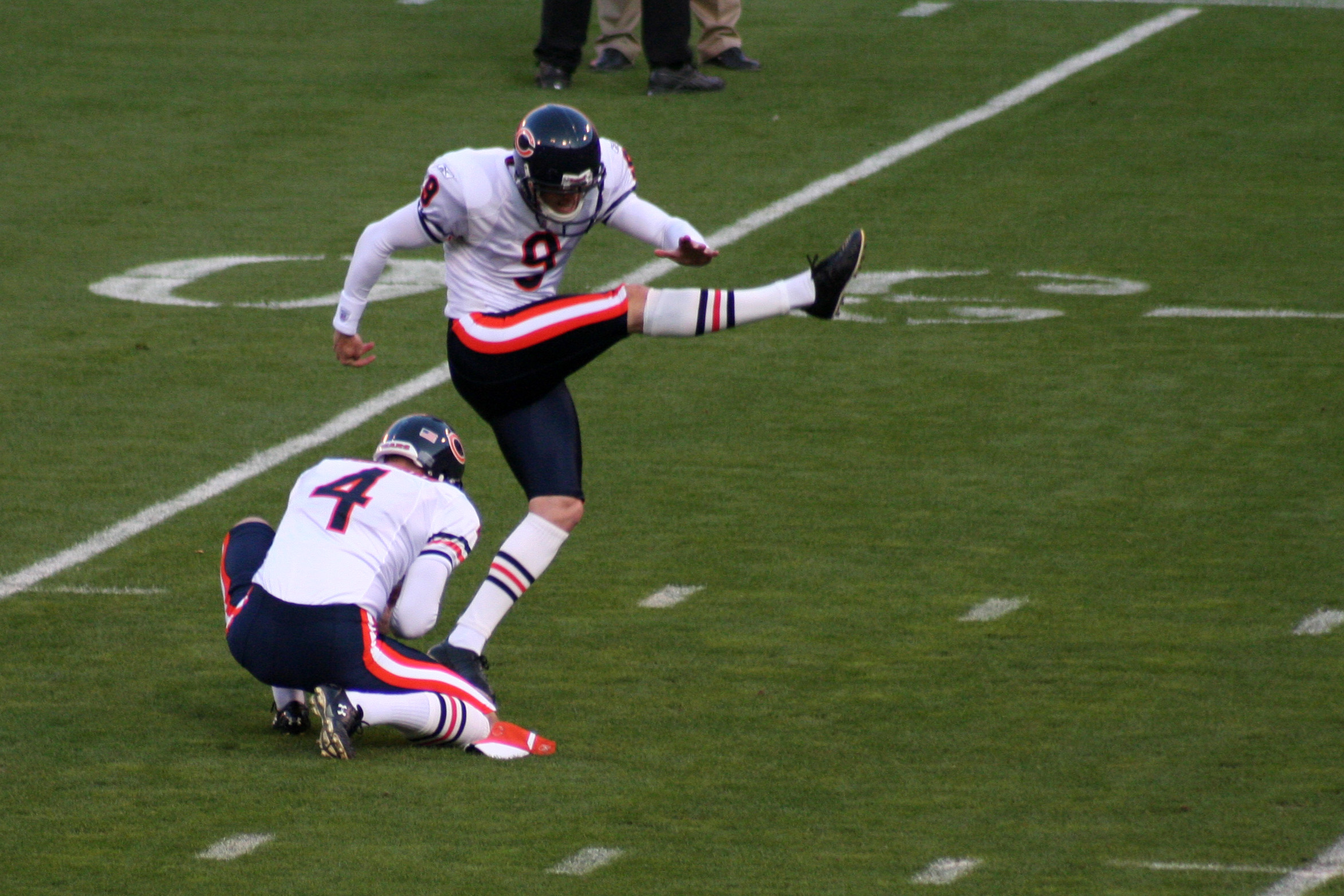
Chicago Bears punter Brad Maynard (#4) holds for placekicker Robbie Gould.

==== Exceptions ====
There are a few NFL teams that still use a quarterback as their holder.

New Orleans Saints – The Saints tend to run more fake field goals than any other team, and due to that they generally keep a backup in as their holder (this keeps opposing defenses in more of a zone coverage, and also helps to prevent blocked field goals). Their holders for a period were quarterback Luke McCown and punter Thomas Morstead. In 1970, Saints kicker Tom Dempsey kicked a 63-yard field goal, which for many years thereafter was the all-time record. Dempsey's holder was a defensive back named Joe Scarpati. There has been an urban myth going around during the intervening decades that the holder on this legendary kick was the team's colorful starting quarterback, Billy Kilmer.

Dallas Cowboys – When Tony Romo was signed by the Dallas Cowboys, he was their backup quarterback, and as the backup quarterback, part of his job was to be the team's holder. Romo was replaced by the punter in 2010, but due to many mishandled snaps, which resulted in missed field goals, Romo returned as the team's official holder. The Cowboys hired a more experienced holder, Brian Moorman, in 2012; Moorman left the team at the end of the season. Throughout the 1990s, starting tight end Jay Novacek was the usual holder on kicks. During their first two Super Bowl seasons (1970 and 1971), reserve running back Dan Reeves, who was also an assistant coach, was the Cowboys' holder. Safety Charlie Waters was the holder during the Cowboys' runs to Super Bowl XII and Super Bowl XIII in 1977 and 1978. Danny White, who was both a quarterback and a punter for many seasons in the 1970s and 1980s, also served as the holder on occasion.

Las Vegas Raiders – The Raiders' Matt Schaub was used as the holder during the 2014 season. Previously, Daryle Lamonica (1967–69) and Ken Stabler (1970–75) held for George Blanda; when Blanda retired in 1976, the holding duties were assumed by punter Ray Guy, who continued to do so through his retirement following the 1986 season.

Denver Broncos – The Broncos used to have former starting quarterback Jake Plummer as their holder and continued to do so even after he was benched in favor of Jay Cutler. When Plummer retired, the Broncos started to use their punter as their holder.

Washington Commanders – Starting quarterback Joe Theismann held for Mark Moseley from the mid-1970s until he suffered his career-ending broken leg during a 1985 Monday Night Football game vs. the New York Giants. The injury did not happen during a field goal attempt: Theismann was sacked while attempting a pass.

Seattle Seahawks – Steve Largent, a wide receiver, was the kick holder, and in 1985, he ran in a muffed snap for an extra point.

Los Angeles Rams -- Safety Nolan Cromwell, a wishbone quarterback at Kansas, was also a holder for most of his 11-year career (1977–87). During a December 1979 game vs. the Minnesota Vikings, he scored touchdown on a fake field goal in overtime to give the Rams a 27–21 victory which clinched the NFC West championship.

== Other responsibilities ==
During a "fake field goal" attempt, the holder may pick the ball up and either throw a forward pass or run with the ball (i.e., act as the quarterback would on a standard play). In addition, the holder may attempt a run or pass if the snap is botched and a successful kick is unlikely. However, this rarely succeeds; the holder is usually tackled promptly. One example in which a botched play still led to points occurred when Brad Wing dropped the ball prior to placing it on the ground, preventing his kicker from making an attempt and creating a "fire drill" situation. Wing stood up with the ball and took a step to the left before turning to the right, allowing him to see Matt Spaeth. Spaeth, a tight end at the end of the blocking line, took advantage of defenders having fallen while attempting to block the non-existent kick, releasing to his right into open space and catching a short pass from Wing to complete a two-point conversion. This made Wing the first Australian to throw for a score in the NFL.

There can also be a holder during kickoffs and free kicks, but this is reserved for when the ball tee cannot keep the ball upright on its own, usually due to wind. In such cases, the holder can be of any position and, because kickoffs involve a higher risk of being involved in a tackling play, is usually a defensive player.

== Awards ==
Given the trivial nature of the position, no award for holders existed until 2015 when Peter Mortell, then a senior punter and holder for the Minnesota Golden Gophers and known for his humor, created a tongue-in-cheek "Holder of the Year" Award for the best holder in college football, named it after himself, and made himself its first recipient. ESPN recognized the award at their yearly ESPY Awards ceremony (alongside more serious, major position awards), with Mortell accepting via pre-recorded video. The award subsequently continued and was awarded in 2016 to senior quarterback/holder Garrett Moores of Michigan. In 2017, the award was given to Connor McGinnis of Oklahoma.
