= Smoke Monday =

American football player (born 2000)

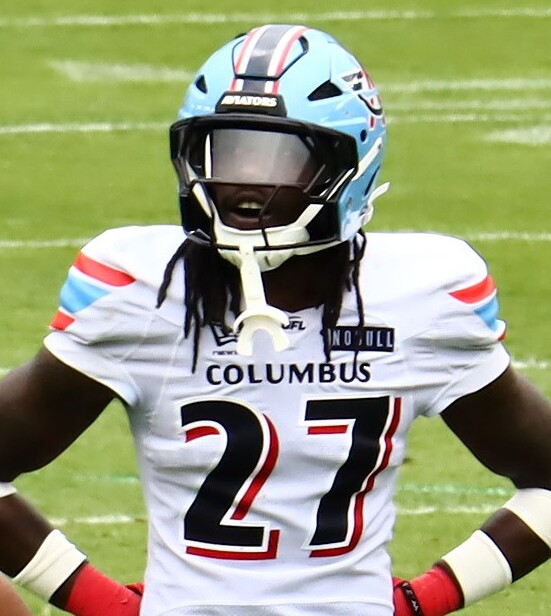
- Monday in 2026

No. 27 – Columbus Aviators
- Position: Safety
- Roster status: Active

Personal information
- Born: February 19, 2000 (age 26); Atlanta, Georgia, U.S.
- Listed height: 6 ft 2 in (1.88 m)
- Listed weight: 206 lb (93 kg)

Career information
- High school: Carver (Atlanta)
- College: Auburn (2018–2021)
- NFL draft: 2022: undrafted

Career history
- New Orleans Saints (2022)*; Montreal Alouettes (2024)*; Massachusetts Pirates (2025); Columbus Aviators (2026–present)
- * Offseason or practice squad member only

Awards and highlights
- Second-team All-SEC (2020)
- Stats at Pro Football Reference

Quindarious "Smoke" Monday (born February 19, 2000) is an American professional football safety for the Columbus Aviators of the United Football League (UFL). He played college football at Auburn.

== Early life ==
Monday attended Carver High School in Atlanta, Georgia. Monday was a four-star recruit and the sixth ranked athlete in the class of 2018. Monday decided to attend Auburn University over various Power 5 offers.

== College career ==
As a freshman, Monday totaled 13 tackles, two sacks, and one interception. Monday's first career start was against Ole Miss, where he was almost ejected for targeting. In his sophomore season, Monday recorded 20 tackles, one sack, and one interception that was returned for a touchdown in the 2019 Iron Bowl. Monday played in all 11 of Auburn's games in 2020 and recorded 64 tackles, one sack, one forced-fumble, and two interceptions. He had a 100-yard interception return for a touchdown in a 30–17 victory over Tennessee. He was named to the Second-team All-Southeastern Conference (SEC). In Monday's senior season, he tallied 58 tackles, two sacks, and one interception. The interception was a pick six tying Monday for the Auburn record for most interceptions returned for a touchdown in Auburn history with three. At the regular season's end, Monday announced he would declare for the 2022 NFL draft following the Tiger's bowl game. In his final collegiate game, Monday recorded five tackles before being ejected for targeting.

== Professional career ==
Pre-draft measurables
Height	Weight	Arm length	Hand span	Wingspan	40-yard dash	10-yard split	20-yard split	20-yard shuttle	Three-cone drill	Vertical jump	Broad jump	Bench press
6 ft 1 3/4 in (1.87 m)	207 lb (94 kg)	32 1/2 in (0.83 m)	9 1/8 in (0.23 m)	6 ft 6 3/4 in (2.00 m)	4.52 s	1.54 s	2.63 s	4.42 s	6.87 s	30.0 in (0.76 m)	10 ft 4 in (3.15 m)	10 reps
All values from NFL Combine/Pro Day

=== New Orleans Saints ===
Monday signed with the New Orleans Saints as an undrafted free agent on April 30, 2022. On August 2, Monday suffered a torn ACL during practice, which prematurely ended his season. He was placed on injured reserve on August 5.

On August 28, 2023, Monday was released by New Orleans.

=== Montreal Alouettes ===
On January 30, 2024, Monday signed with the Montreal Alouettes of the Canadian Football League. He was released on June 2.

=== Massachusetts Pirates ===
On June 5, 2025, Monday signed with the Massachusetts Pirates of the Indoor Football League (IFL). He started all five of his appearances for the Pirates, logging 20 tackles and one interception.

On December 6, 2025, Monday re-signed with the team, now rebranded as the Orlando Pirates.

=== Columbus Aviators ===
On January 26, 2025, Monday signed with the Columbus Aviators of the United Football League (UFL). He was released on March 19, but was re-signed on April 2.
