= 2020 Arkansas Razorbacks football team =

American college football season

2020 Arkansas Razorbacks football
- Conference: Southeastern Conference
- Western Division
- Record: 3–7 (3–7 SEC)
- Head coach: Sam Pittman (1st season)
- Offensive coordinator: Kendal Briles (1st season)
- Offensive scheme: Hurry-up, no-huddle spread
- Defensive coordinator: Barry Odom (1st season)
- Base defense: 3–2–6
- Captains: Rakeem Boyd; Feleipe Franks; Jonathan Marshall; Grant Morgan
- Home stadium: Donald W. Reynolds Razorback Stadium

2020 Southeastern Conference football standings
	Conf.			Overall
Team	W		L	W		L
Eastern Division
No. 13 Florida x	8	–	2	8	–	4
No. 7 Georgia	7	–	2	8	–	2
Missouri	5	–	5	5	–	5
Kentucky	4	–	6	5	–	6
Tennessee*	3	–	7	3	–	7
South Carolina	2	–	8	2	–	8
Vanderbilt	0	–	9	0	–	9
Western Division
No. 1 Alabama x$#^	10	–	0	13	–	0
No. 4 Texas A&M	8	–	1	9	–	1
Auburn	6	–	4	6	–	5
LSU*	5	–	5	5	–	5
Ole Miss	4	–	5	5	–	5
Arkansas	3	–	7	3	–	7
Mississippi State	3	–	7	4	–	7
Championship: Alabama 52, Florida 46
# – College Football Playoff champion; ^ – College Football Playoff participant; $ – Conference champion; x – Division champion/co-champions; * – Tennessee vacated all wins due to NCAA violations. LSU was ineligible for postseason due to self imposed ban. Note: Due to COVID-19, the SEC played a conference-only schedule.; Rankings from AP Poll.

The 2020 Arkansas Razorbacks football team represented the University of Arkansas as a member of the Southeastern Conference (SEC) during the 2020 NCAA Division I FBS football season. Led by first-year head coach Sam Pittman, the Razorbacks compiled an overall record of 3–7 with an identical mark in conference play, tying for sixth place at the bottom of the standings in the SEC's Western Division. The team played home games at Donald W. Reynolds Razorback Stadium in Fayetteville, Arkansas.

This was the first season since War Memorial Stadium in Little Rock opened that the Razorbacks did not play at least one home game in the stadium. Arkansas was scheduled to play the annual Red/White spring game at War Memorial in April at the conclusion of spring practice, but the SEC did not approve those plans.

On October 3, Arkansas defeated No. 16 Mississippi State, 21–14, snapping a 20-game SEC losing streak. The win was the Razorbacks' first conference win since October 2017, their first win against a ranked team since November 2016, and their first road win against a ranked SEC team since November 2015. After the regular season, the Razorbacks accepted a bid to the Texas Bowl. Slated to face TCU, the bowl was canceled when TCU withdrew due to COVID-19 issues within their program.

== Schedule ==
Arkansas had non-conference games scheduled against Charleston Southern, Louisiana–Monroe, Nevada, and Notre Dame that were canceled due to the COVID-19 pandemic. In August 2020, the SEC revealed a revised ten-game conference schedule, consisting of the eight conference games previously scheduled plus an additional two interdivisional games, one home and one away, for each team. After Arkansas was scheduled to play Georgia and Florida, the top two teams in the SEC's Eastern Division in 2019, athletic director Hunter Yurachek stated that Arkansas had "the most challenging schedule in the history of college football." Arkansas' full ten-game schedule, consisting of five home games and five away games, was released by the conference on August 17.

On November 23, Arkansas' game against Missouri was postponed due to an increase in COVID-19 cases within the Arkansas program. On November 27, the SEC revised the schedules of multiple teams, moving the Arkansas–Missouri contest to December 5 and the Arkansas–Alabama game to a date to be determined, later scheduled for December 12. The Razorbacks were selected to participate in the 2020 Texas Bowl against TCU, but the game was canceled two days beforehand because of COVID-19 concerns in the Horned Frogs' program.

Date	Time	Opponent	Site	TV	Result	Attendance	Source
September 26	3:00 p.m.	No. 4 Georgia	Donald W. Reynolds Razorback Stadium; Fayetteville, AR	SECN	L 10–37	16,500	
October 3	6:30 p.m.	at No. 16 Mississippi State	Davis Wade Stadium; Starkville, MS	SECN Alt.	W 21–14	13,564	
October 10	3:00 p.m.	at No. 13 Auburn	Jordan–Hare Stadium; Auburn, AL	ESPN	L 28–30	17,490	
October 17	2:30 p.m.	Ole Miss^{†}	Donald W. Reynolds Razorback Stadium; Fayetteville, AR (rivalry)	SECN	W 33–21	16,500	
October 31	6:30 p.m.	at No. 8 Texas A&M	Kyle Field; College Station, TX (rivalry)	SECN	L 31–42	27,114	
November 7	6:30 p.m.	Tennessee	Donald W. Reynolds Razorback Stadium; Fayetteville, AR	SECN	W 24–13	16,500	
November 14	6:00 p.m.	at No. 6 Florida	Ben Hill Griffin Stadium; Gainesville, FL	ESPN	L 35–63	16,116	
November 21	11:00 a.m.	LSU	Donald W. Reynolds Razorback Stadium; Fayetteville, AR (rivalry)	SECN	L 24–27	16,500	
December 5	11:00 a.m.	at Missouri	Faurot Field; Columbia, MO (Battle Line Rivalry)	SECN	L 48–50	11,738	
December 12	11:00 a.m.	No. 1 Alabama	Donald W. Reynolds Razorback Stadium; Fayetteville, AR	ESPN	L 3–52	16,500	
December 31	7:00 p.m.	vs. TCU*	NRG Stadium; Houston, TX (Texas Bowl)	ESPN	Cancelled		
*Non-conference game; ^{†}Homecoming; Rankings from AP Poll and CFP Rankings (after November 24) released prior to game; All times are in Central time

== Rankings ==
Ranking movements Legend: ██ Increase in ranking ██ Decrease in ranking — = Not ranked RV = Received votes
	Week															
Poll	Pre	1	2	3	4	5	6	7	8	9	10	11	12	13	14	Final
AP	—	—*	—	—	—	RV	—	RV	RV	—	—	—	—	—		
Coaches	—	—*	—	—	—	RV	RV	RV	RV	RV	RV	RV	—	—		
CFP	Not released												—	—		Not released

*Poll not released week 1.

== Preseason ==
=== SEC Media Days ===
In the preseason media poll, Arkansas was predicted to finish in last place in the West Division.

=== Preseason All-SEC teams ===
The Razorbacks had one player selected to the preseason all-SEC teams, released on September 17, 2020.

Offense

2nd team

Rakeem Boyd – RB

== Game summaries ==
=== No. 4 Georgia ===
Game One – No. 4 Georgia Bulldogs (0–0) at Arkansas Razorbacks (0–0)

Quarter	1	2	3	4	Total
No. 4 Bulldogs	0	5	22	10	37
Razorbacks	7	0	3	0	10

at Donald W. Reynolds Razorback Stadium • Fayetteville, Arkansas

- Date: Saturday, September 26, 2020
- Game time: 3:00 p.m. CDT
- Game weather: Clear • Temperature: 80 °F (27 °C) • Wind: S 11 mph
- Game attendance: 16,500
- Referee: Lee Hendrick
- TV announcers (SEC Network): Dave Neal (play-by-play), D. J. Shockley (analyst) and Tera Talmadge (sideline)
- ESPN

Game information

First quarter

- (8:48) ARK – Treylon Burks 49 yard pass from Feleipe Franks, A.J. Reed kick (Drive: 7 plays, 91 yards, 2:17; Arkansas 7–0)

Second quarter

- (14:30) UGA – Arkansas fumble through the back of the end zone, safety (Arkansas 7–2)
- (0:00) UGA – Jack Podlesny 38 yard field goal (Drive: 8 plays, 59 yards, 1:00; Arkansas 7–5)

Third quarter

- (8:23) ARK – A.J. Reed 25 yard field goal (Drive: 11 plays, 43 yards, 4:15; Arkansas 10–5)
- (6:00) UGA – George Pickens 19 yard pass from Stetson Bennett, 2-point run good (Drive: 6 plays, 57 yards, 2:23; Georgia 13–10)
- (3:20) UGA – John FitzPatrick 7 yard pass from Stetson Bennett, Jack Podlesny kick (Drive: 4 plays, 24 yards, 1:11; Georgia 20–10)
- (2:53) UGA – Eric Stokes 30 yard interception return, Jack Podlesny kick (Georgia 27–10)

Fourth quarter

- (11:15) UGA – Zamir White 6 yard rush, Jack Podlesny kick (Drive: 13 plays, 81 yards, 5:38; Georgia 34–10)
- (1:23) UGA – Jack Podlesny 38 yard field goal (Drive: 6 plays, 22 yards, 2:36; Georgia 37–10)

Statistics	UGA	ARK
First downs	19	15
Plays–yards	89–387	67–280
Rushes–yards	42–121	28–77
Passing yards	266	203
Passing: comp–att–int	28–47–1	20–39–3
Time of possession	35:46	24:14

Team	Category	Player	Statistics
Georgia	Passing	Stetson Bennett	20/29, 211 yards, 2 TD
Georgia	Rushing	Zamir White	13 carries, 71 yards, 1 TD
Georgia	Receiving	Kearis Jackson	6 receptions, 62 yards
Arkansas	Passing	Feleipe Franks	19/36, 200 yards, 1 TD, 2 INT
Arkansas	Rushing	Trelon Smith	6 carries, 38 yards
Arkansas	Receiving	Treylon Burks	7 receptions, 102 yards, 1 TD

=== At No. 16 Mississippi State ===
Game Two – Arkansas Razorbacks (0–1) at No. 16 Mississippi State Bulldogs (1–0)

Quarter	1	2	3	4	Total
Razorbacks	7	7	7	0	21
No. 16 Bulldogs	7	0	7	0	14

at Davis Wade Stadium • Starkville, Mississippi

- Date: Saturday, October 3, 2020
- Game time: 6:30 p.m. CDT
- Game weather: Clear • Temperature: 64 °F (18 °C) • Wind: Calm
- Game attendance: 13,564
- Referee: Matt Loeffler
- TV announcers (SEC Network): Roy Philpott (play-by-play), Kelly Stouffer (analyst), Tera Talmadge (sideline)
- ESPN

Game information

First quarter

- (11:44) ARK – Greg Brooks Jr. 69 yard interception return, A.J. Reed kick (Arkansas 7–0)
- (4:10) MSST – JaVonta Payton 17 yard pass from K. J. Costello, Brandon Ruiz kick (Drive: 15 plays, 75 yards, 7:45; Tied 7–7)

Second quarter

- (5:27) ARK – De'Vion Warren 19 yard pass from Feleipe Franks, A.J. Reed kick (Drive: 8 plays, 69 yards, 2:33; Arkansas 14–7)

Third quarter

- (11:21) ARK – Hudson Henry 12 yard pass from Feleipe Franks, A.J. Reed kick (Drive: 11 plays, 75 yards, 3:39; Arkansas 21–7)
- (3:50) MSST – Dillon Johnson 6 yard rush, Brandon Ruiz kick (Drive: 14 plays, 76 yards, 7:21; Arkansas 21–14)

Fourth quarter
No scoring plays

Statistics	ARK	MSST
First downs	17	24
Plays–yards	65–275	84–400
Rushes–yards	37–63	24–87
Passing yards	212	313
Passing: comp–att–int	20–28–0	43–60–3
Time of possession	23:40	36:20

Team	Category	Player	Statistics
Arkansas	Passing	Feleipe Franks	20/28, 212 yards, 2 TD
Arkansas	Rushing	Trelon Smith	14 carries, 48 yards
Arkansas	Receiving	De'Vion Warren	4 receptions, 100 yards, 1 TD
Mississippi State	Passing	K. J. Costello	43/59, 313 yards, 1 TD, 3 INT
Mississippi State	Rushing	Dillon Johnson	9 carries, 39 yards, 1 TD
Mississippi State	Receiving	Osirus Mitchell	5 receptions, 61 yards

=== At No. 13 Auburn ===
Game Three – Arkansas Razorbacks (1–1) at No. 13 Auburn Tigers (1–1)

Quarter	1	2	3	4	Total
Razorbacks	0	12	6	10	28
No. 13 Tigers	10	10	0	10	30

at Jordan–Hare Stadium • Auburn, Alabama

- Date: Saturday, October 10, 2020
- Game time: 3:00 p.m. CDT
- Game weather: Rain • Temperature: 75 °F (24 °C) • Wind: SE 9 mph
- Game attendance: 17,490
- Referee: Jason Autrey
- TV announcers (ESPN): Taylor Zarzour (play-by-play), Matt Stinchcomb (analyst), Lauren Sisler (sideline)
- ESPN

Game information

First quarter

- (4:32) AUB – Blocked punt recovered by Barton Lester in the end zone, Anders Carlson kick (Auburn 7–0)
- (0:36) AUB – Anders Carlson 47 yard field goal (Drive: 5 plays, 47 yards, 2:34; Auburn 10–0)

Second quarter

- (9:22) AUB – Bo Nix 15 yard rush, Anders Carlson kick (Drive: 10 plays, 80 yards, 4:49; Auburn 17–0)
- (6:24) ARK – Michael Woods II 4 yard pass from Feleipe Franks, kick failed (Drive: 8 plays, 65 yards, 2:58; Auburn 17–6)
- (2:15) ARK – De'Vion Warren 7 yard pass from Feleipe Franks, 2-point pass failed (Drive: 6 plays, 75 yards, 2:00; Auburn 17–12)
- (0:38) AUB – Anders Carlson 25 yard field goal (Drive: 6 plays, 57 yards, 1:37; Auburn 20–12)

Third quarter

- (4:14) ARK – Trelon Smith 5 yard pass from Feleipe Franks, 2-point pass failed (Drive: 13 plays, 85 yards, 5:30; Auburn 20–18)

Fourth quarter

- (14:51) AUB – Anthony Schwartz 17 yard pass from Bo Nix, Anders Carlson kick (Drive: 9 plays, 64 yards, 4:23; Auburn 27–18)
- (11:37) ARK – A.J. Reed 23 yard field goal (Drive: 10 plays, 70 yards, 4:50; Auburn 27–21)
- (5:29) ARK – De'Vion Warren 30 yard pass from Feleipe Franks, A.J. Reed kick (Drive: 10 plays, 70 yards, 4:50; Arkansas 28–27)
- (0:07) AUB – Anders Carlson 39 yard field goal (Drive: 7 plays, 23 yards, 1:59; Auburn 30–28)

Statistics	ARK	AUB
First downs	22	24
Plays–yards	72–437	70–446
Rushes–yards	42–119	41–259
Passing yards	318	187
Passing: comp–att–int	22–30–0	18–29–0
Time of possession	27:42	32:18

Team	Category	Player	Statistics
Arkansas	Passing	Feleipe Franks	22/30, 318 yards, 4 TD
Arkansas	Rushing	Trelon Smith	21 carries, 81 yards
Arkansas	Receiving	De'Vion Warren	5 receptions, 95 yards, 2 TD
Auburn	Passing	Bo Nix	17/28, 187 yards, 1 TD
Auburn	Rushing	Tank Bigsby	20 carries, 146 yards
Auburn	Receiving	Anthony Schwartz	10 receptions, 100 yards, 1 TD

=== Ole Miss ===
Game Four – Ole Miss Rebels (1–2) at Arkansas Razorbacks (1–2)

Quarter	1	2	3	4	Total
Rebels	0	0	7	14	21
Razorbacks	7	13	0	13	33

at Donald W. Reynolds Razorback Stadium • Fayetteville, Arkansas

- Date: Saturday, October 17, 2020
- Game time: 2:30 p.m. CDT
- Game weather: Clear • Temperature: 69 °F (21 °C) • Wind: S 20 mph
- Game attendance: 16,500
- Referee: James Carter
- TV announcers (SEC Network): Dave Flemming (play-by-play), Rod Gilmore (analyst), Tera Talmadge (sideline)
- ESPN

Game information

First quarter

- (5:47) ARK – Rakeem Boyd 1 yard rush, A.J. Reed kick (Drive: 11 plays, 95 yards, 4:11; Arkansas 7–0)

Second quarter

- (10:50) ARK – A.J. Reed 23 yard field goal (Drive: 7 plays, 42 yards, 2:25; Arkansas 10–0)
- (10:40) ARK – Jalen Catalon 35 yard interception return, A.J. Reed kick (Arkansas 17–0)
- (1:41) ARK – A.J. Reed 32 yard field goal (Drive: 12 plays, 50 yards, 3:21; Arkansas 20–0)

Third quarter

- (4:35) MISS – Elijah Moore 7 yard pass from Matt Corral, Luke Logan kick (Drive: 10 plays, 56 yards, 4:07; Arkansas 20–7)

Fourth quarter

- (12:06) MISS – Jonathan Mingo 21 yard pass from Matt Corral, Luke Logan kick (Drive: 8 plays, 66 yards, 2:34; Arkansas 20–14)
- (7:36) ARK – Treylon Burks 7 yard pass from Feleipe Franks, 2-point rush failed (Drive: 11 plays, 70 yards, 4:30; Arkansas 26–14)
- (5:30) MISS – Jerrion Ealy 1 yard rush, Luke Logan kick (Drive: 7 plays, 73 yards, 2:06; Arkansas 26–21)
- (3:07) ARK – Grant Morgan 23 yard interception return, A.J. Reed kick (Arkansas 33–21)

Statistics	MISS	ARK
First downs	23	24
Plays–yards	91–442	82–394
Rushes–yards	53–242	48–150
Passing yards	200	244
Passing: comp–att–int	20–38–6	21–34–1
Time of possession	29:31	30:29

Team	Category	Player	Statistics
Ole Miss	Passing	Matt Corral	20/38, 200 yards, 2 TD, 6 INT
Ole Miss	Rushing	Jerrion Ealy	23 carries, 112 yards, 1 TD
Ole Miss	Receiving	Elijah Moore	11 receptions, 113 yards, 1 TD
Arkansas	Passing	Feleipe Franks	21/34, 244 yards, 1 TD, 1 INT
Arkansas	Rushing	Trelon Smith	15 carries, 54 yards
Arkansas	Receiving	Treylon Burks	11 receptions, 137 yards, 1 TD

=== At No. 8 Texas A&M ===
Game Five – Arkansas Razorbacks (2–2) at No. 8 Texas A&M Aggies (3–1)

Quarter	1	2	3	4	Total
Razorbacks	7	7	3	14	31
No. 8 Aggies	14	14	14	0	42

at Kyle Field • College Station, Texas

- Date: Saturday, October 31, 2020
- Game time: 6:30 p.m. CDT
- Game weather: Clear • Temperature: 70 °F (21 °C) • Wind: SSE 9 mph
- Game attendance: 27,114
- Referee: Marc Curles
- TV announcers (SEC Network): Taylor Zarzour (play-by-play), Matt Stinchcomb (analyst), Lauren Sisler (sideline)
- ESPN

Game information

First quarter

- (8:09) ARK – Treylon Burks 6 yard pass from Feleipe Franks, A.J. Reed kick (Drive: 12 plays, 87 yards, 4:49; Arkansas 7–0)
- (3:57) TAMU – Ainias Smith 35 yard pass from Kellen Mond, Seth Small kick (Drive: 8 plays, 75 yards, 4:12; Tied 7–7)
- (0:34) TAMU – Ainias Smith 15 yard rush, Seth Small kick (Drive: 4 plays, 58 yards, 2:22; Texas A&M 14–7)

Second quarter

- (6:43) TAMU – Jalen Wydermyer 6 yard pass from Kellen Mond, Seth Small kick (Drive: 11 plays, 69 yards, 5:35; Texas A&M 21–7)
- (4:13) ARK – Tyson Morris 1 yard pass from Feleipe Franks, A.J. Reed kick (Drive: 8 plays, 75 yards, 2:30; Texas A&M 21–14)
- (1:13) TAMU – Isaiah Spiller 6 yard rush, Seth Small kick (Drive: 7 plays, 74 yards, 3:00; Texas A&M 28–14)

Third quarter

- (10:22) ARK – A.J. Reed 34 yard field goal (Drive: 11 plays, 58 yards, 4:38; Texas A&M 28–17)
- (5:22) TAMU – Jalen Wydermyer 15 yard pass from Kellen Mond, Seth Small kick (Drive: 9 plays, 75 yards, 5:00; Texas A&M 35–17)
- (0:56) TAMU – De'Von Achane 30 yard rush, Seth Small kick (Drive: 6 plays, 68 yards, 2:36; Texas A&M 42–17)

Fourth quarter

- (13:09) ARK – Treylon Burks 16 yard pass from Feleipe Franks, A.J. Reed kick (Drive: 8 plays, 75 yards, 2:47; Texas A&M 42–24)
- (0:36) ARK – Rakeem Boyd 14 yard rush, A.J. Reed kick (Drive: 6 plays, 69 yards, 1:29; Texas A&M 42–31)

Statistics	ARK	TAMU
First downs	29	25
Plays–yards	74–461	62–442
Rushes–yards	42–222	36–182
Passing yards	239	260
Passing: comp–att–int	23–32–0	21–26–0
Time of possession	27:01	32:59

Team	Category	Player	Statistics
Arkansas	Passing	Feleipe Franks	23/31, 239 yards, 3 TD
Arkansas	Rushing	Rakeem Boyd	18 carries, 100 yards, 1 TD
Arkansas	Receiving	Treylon Burks	7 receptions, 117 yards, 2 TD
Texas A&M	Passing	Kellen Mond	21/26, 260 yards, 3 TD
Texas A&M	Rushing	Isaiah Spiller	21 carries, 82 yards, 1 TD
Texas A&M	Receiving	Jalen Wydermyer	6 receptions, 92 yards, 2 TD

=== Tennessee ===
Game Six – Tennessee Volunteers (2–3) at Arkansas Razorbacks (2–3)

Quarter	1	2	3	4	Total
Volunteers	3	10	0	0	13
Razorbacks	0	0	24	0	24

at Donald W. Reynolds Razorback Stadium • Fayetteville, Arkansas

- Date: Saturday, November 7, 2020
- Game time: 6:30 p.m. CST
- Game weather: Clear • Temperature: 62 °F (17 °C) • Wind: SE 6 mph
- Game attendance: 16,500
- Referee: Mark Loeffler
- TV announcers (SEC Network): Tom Hart (play-by-play), Jordan Rodgers (analyst), Cole Cubelic (sideline)
- ESPN

Game information

First quarter

- (9:25) TENN – Brent Cimaglia 50 yard field goal (Drive: 12 plays, 42 yards, 5:35; Tennessee 3–0)

Second quarter

- (13:35) TENN – Eric Gray 1 yard rush, Brent Cimaglia kick (Drive: 16 plays, 81 yards, 8:29; Tennessee 10–0)
- (1:57) TENN – Brent Cimaglia 48 yard field goal (Drive: 8 plays, 49 yards, 3:53; Tennessee 13–0)

Third quarter

- (9:46) ARK – Michael Woods II 1 yard pass from Feleipe Franks, A.J. Reed kick (Drive: 17 plays, 75 yards, 5:14; Tennessee 13–7)
- (6:35) ARK – Blake Kern 6 yard pass from Feleipe Franks, A.J. Reed kick (Drive: 3 plays, 67 yards, 1:00; Arkansas 14–13)
- (4:13) ARK – Treylon Burks 59 yard pass from Feleipe Franks, A.J. Reed kick (Drive: 2 yards, 81 yards, 0:29; Arkansas 21–13)
- (0:07) ARK – A.J. Reed 48 yard field goal (Drive: 7 plays, 49 yards, 3:04; Arkansas 24–13)

Fourth quarter
No scoring plays

Statistics	TENN	ARK
First downs	19	21
Plays–yards	71–292	70–413
Rushes–yards	50–185	45–198
Passing yards	107	215
Passing: comp–att–int	11–21–2	18–25–0
Time of possession	32:59	27:01

Team	Category	Player	Statistics
Tennessee	Passing	Harrison Bailey	6/9, 65 yards, 2 INT
Tennessee	Rushing	Eric Gray	31 carries, 123 yards, 1 TD
Tennessee	Receiving	Josh Palmer	2 receptions, 28 yards
Arkansas	Passing	Feleipe Franks	18/24, 215 yards, 3 TD
Arkansas	Rushing	Trelon Smith	9 carries, 72 yards
Arkansas	Receiving	Treylon Burks	5 receptions, 95 yards, 1 TD

=== At No. 6 Florida ===
Game Seven – Arkansas Razorbacks (3–3) at No. 6 Florida Gators (4–1)

Quarter	1	2	3	4	Total
Razorbacks	7	7	7	14	35
No. 6 Gators	7	28	7	21	63

at Ben Hill Griffin Stadium • Gainesville, Florida

- Date: Saturday, November 14, 2020
- Game time: 6:00 p.m. CST
- Game weather: Clear • Temperature: 68 °F (20 °C) • Wind: NW 4 mph
- Game attendance: 16,116
- Referee: Steve Marlowe
- TV announcers (ESPN): Bob Wischusen (play-by-play), Dan Orlovsky (analyst), Allison Williams (sideline)
- ESPN

Game information

First quarter

- (7:36) FLA – Trevon Grimes 9 yard pass from Kyle Trask, Evan McPherson kick (Drive: 14 plays, 75 yards, 7:24; Florida 7–0)
- (6:03) ARK – Michael Woods II 47 yard pass from Feleipe Franks, A.J. Reed kick (Drive: 5 plays, 75 yards, 1:33; Tied 7–7)

Second quarter

- (10:03) FLA – Trevon Grimes 23 yard pass from Kyle Trask, Evan McPherson kick (Drive: 9 plays, 49 yards, 4:53; Florida 14–7)
- (7:17) FLA – Justin Shorter 21 yard pass from Kyle Trask, Evan McPherson kick (Drive: 4 plays, 74 yards, 1:11; Florida 21–7)
- (6:55) ARK – Trelon Smith 83 yard rush, A.J Reed kick (Drive: 1 play, 83 yards, 0:11; Florida 21–14)
- (4:33) FLA – Jacob Copeland 33 yard pass from Kyle Trask, Evan McPherson kick (Drive: 5 plays, 65 yards, 2:22; Florida 28–14)
- (0:17) FLA – Ken Zipperer 5 yard pass from Kyle Trask, Evan McPherson kick (Drive: 7 plays, 53 yards, 2:40; Florida 35–14)

Third quarter

- (12:00) ARK – Rakeem Boyd 12 yard rush, A.J. Reed kick (Drive: 9 plays, 75 yards, 3:00; Florida 35–21)
- (3:01) FLA – Emory Jones 1 yard rush, Evan McPherson kick (Drive: 8 plays, 83 yards, 4:06; Florida 42–21)

Fourth quarter

- (13:08) FLA – Ken Zipperer 11 yard pass from Kyle Trask, Evan McPherson kick (Drive: 8 plays, 76 yards, 2:31; Florida 49–21)
- (12:17) FLA – Zachary Carter 35 yard fumble return, Evan McPherson kick (Florida 56–21)
- (11:51) ARK – Michael Woods II 82 yard pass from Feleipe Franks, A.J. Reed kick (Drive: 1 play, 82 yards, 0:17; Florida 56–28)
- (5:41) FLA – Xzavier Henderson 9 yard pass from Emory Jones, Evan McPherson kick (Drive: 12 plays, 75 yards, 6:10; Florida 63–28)
- (0:40) ARK – K.J. Jefferson 12 yard rush, A.J. Reed kick (Drive: 4 plays, 23 yards, 1:25; Florida 63–35)

Statistics	ARK	FLA
First downs	18	36
Plays–yards	51–458	83–593
Rushes–yards	32–208	45–208
Passing yards	250	385
Passing: comp–att–int	15–19–0	27–38–1
Time of possession	21:12	38:48

Team	Category	Player	Statistics
Arkansas	Passing	Feleipe Franks	15/19, 250 yards, 2 TD
Arkansas	Rushing	Trelon Smith	8 carries, 118 yards, 1 TD
Arkansas	Receiving	Michael Woods II	2 receptions, 129 yards, 2 TD
Florida	Passing	Kyle Trask	23/29, 356 yards, 6 TD
Florida	Rushing	Dameon Pierce	12 carries, 69 yards
Florida	Receiving	Trevon Grimes	6 receptions, 109 yards, 2 TD

=== LSU ===
Game Eight – LSU Tigers (2–3) at Arkansas Razorbacks (3–4)

Quarter	1	2	3	4	Total
Tigers	3	17	0	7	27
Razorbacks	7	7	7	3	24

at Donald W. Reynolds Razorback Stadium • Fayetteville, Arkansas

- Date: Saturday, November 21, 2020
- Game time: 11:00 a.m. CST
- Game weather: Cloudy • Temperature: 63 °F (17 °C) • Wind: N 2 mph
- Game attendance: 16,500
- Referee: Marc Curles
- TV announcers (SEC Network): Taylor Zarzour (play-by-play), Matt Stinchcomb (analyst), Tera Talmadge (reporter)
- ESPN

Game information

First quarter

- (7:37) LSU – Cade York 49 yard field goal (Drive: 8 plays, 51 yards, 2:16; LSU 3–0)
- (3:40) ARK – Treylon Burks 65 yard pass from Feleipe Franks, A.J. Reed kick (Drive: 4 plays, 92 yards, 1:05; Arkansas 7–3)

Second quarter

- (13:54) LSU – Racey McMath 30 yard pass from T. J. Finley, Cade York kick (Drive: 10 plays, 75 yards, 4:46; LSU 10–7)
- (4:21) LSU – Tyrion Davis-Price 1 yard rush, Cade York kick (Drive: 1 play, 1 yard, 0:03; LSU 17–7)
- (3:44) ARK – Feleipe Franks 10 yard rush, A.J. Reed kick (Drive: 3 plays, 75 yards, 0:37; LSU 17–14)
- (0:00) LSU – Cade York 24 yard field goal (Drive: 14 plays, 69 yards, 3:44; LSU 20–14)

Third quarter

- (1:04) ARK – Trelon Smith 1 yard rush, A.J. Reed kick (Drive: 6 plays, 95 yards, 1:30; Arkansas 21–20)

Fourth quarter

- (12:42) ARK – A.J. Reed 22 yard field goal (Drive: 7 plays, 88 yards, 2:24; Arkansas 24–20)
- (3:59) LSU – Jaray Jenkins 13 yard pass from T. J. Finley, Cade York kick (Drive: 10 plays, 67 yards, 3:31; LSU 27–24)

Statistics	LSU	ARK
First downs	24	14
Plays–yards	91–419	53–443
Rushes–yards	49–148	27–104
Passing yards	271	339
Passing: comp–att–int	27–42–0	17–26–1
Time of possession	41:43	18:17

Team	Category	Player	Statistics
LSU	Passing	T. J. Finley	27/42, 271 yards, 2 TD
LSU	Rushing	Tyrion Davis-Price	24 carries, 104 yards, 1 TD
LSU	Receiving	Terrace Marshall Jr.	7 receptions, 57 yards
Arkansas	Passing	Feleipe Franks	17/26, 339 yards, 1 TD, 1 INT
Arkansas	Rushing	Feleipe Franks	14 carries, 43 yards, 1 TD
Arkansas	Receiving	Michael Woods II	4 receptions, 140 yards

=== At Missouri ===
Game Nine – Arkansas Razorbacks (3–5) vs. Missouri Tigers (4–3)

Quarter	1	2	3	4	Total
Razorbacks	6	21	6	15	48
Tigers	10	10	3	27	50

at Faurot Field • Columbia, Missouri

- Date: Saturday, December 5, 2020
- Game time: 11:00 a.m. CST
- Game weather: Clear • Temperature: 52 °F (11 °C) • Wind: W 3 mph
- Game attendance: 11,738
- Referee: Lee Hedrick
- TV announcers (SEC Network): Dave Neal (play-by-play), D. J. Shockley (analyst), Dawn Davenport (sideline)

Game information

First quarter

- (12:12) MIZ – Harrison Mevis 51 yard field goal (Drive: 7 plays, 37 yards, 2:48; Missouri 3–0)
- (6:17) MIZ – Larry Rountree 2 yard rush, Harrison Mevis kick (Drive: 12 plays, 69 yards, 5:19; Missouri 10–0)
- (1:48) ARK – Blake Kern 2 yard pass from KJ Jefferson, kick failed (Drive: 12 plays, 75 yards, 4:29; Missouri 10–6)

Second quarter

- (11:56) MIZ – Harrison Mevis 29 yard field goal (Drive: 12 plays, 63 yards, 4:52; Missouri 13–6)
- (11:16) ARK – Treylon Burks 68 yard pass from KJ Jefferson, A.J. Reed kick (Drive: 3 plays, 89 yards, 0:35; Tied 13–13)
- (7:45) MIZ – Larry Rountree 6 yard rush, Harrison Mevis kick (Drive: 8 plays, 75 yards, 3:31; Missouri 20–13)
- (3:39) ARK – Trelon Smith 8 yard rush, A.J. Reed kick (Drive: 13 plays, 75 yards, 4:06; Tied 20–20)
- (0:20) ARK – KJ Jefferson 1 yard rush, A.J. Reed kick (Drive: 9 plays, 70 yards, 1:50; Arkansas 27–20)

Third quarter

- (10:23) MIZ – Harrison Mevis 37 yard field goal (Drive: 6 plays, 60 yards, 3:07; Arkansas 27–23)
- (8:18) ARK – Trelon Smith 15 yard rush, kick failed (Drive: 8 plays, 75 yards, 2:05; Arkansas 33–23)

Fourth quarter

- (14:51) MIZ – Harrison Mevis 40 yard field goal (Drive: 14 plays, 61 yards, 5:34; Arkansas 33–26)
- (13:15) ARK – Trelon Smith 16 yard rush, A.J. Reed kick (Drive: 7 plays, 75 yards, 1:35; Arkansas 40–26)
- (12:41) MIZ – Tyler Badie 46 yard rush, Harrison Mevis kick (Drive: 2 plays, 75 yards, 0:34; Arkansas 40–33)
- (7:46) MIZ – Larry Rountree 9 yard rush, Harrison Mevis kick (Drive: 8 plays, 82 yards, 2:07; Tied 40–40)
- (4:47) MIZ – Tyler Badie 25 yard rush, Harrison Mevis kick (Drive: 4 plays, 80 yards, 1:26; Missouri 47–40)
- (0:43) ARK – Michael Woods II 14 yard pass from KJ Jefferson, 2-point pass good (Drive: 13 plays, 75 yards, 4:04; Arkansas 48–47)
- (0:00) MIZ – Harrison Mevis 32 yard field goal (Drive: 7 plays, 60 yards, 0:43; Missouri 50–48)

Statistics	ARK	MIZ
First downs	34	37
Plays–yards	84–566	87–653
Rushes–yards	50–292	38–273
Passing yards	274	380
Passing: comp–att–int	18–34–0	32–49–0
Time of possession	26:28	33:32

Team	Category	Player	Statistics
Arkansas	Passing	KJ Jefferson	18/33, 274 yards, 3 TD
Arkansas	Rushing	Trelon Smith	26 carries, 172 yards, 3 TD
Arkansas	Receiving	Treylon Burks	10 receptions, 206 yards, 1 TD
Missouri	Passing	Connor Bazelak	32/49, 380 yards
Missouri	Rushing	Larry Rountree III	27 carries, 185 yards, 3 TD
Missouri	Receiving	Keke Chism	6 receptions, 113 yards

=== No. 1 Alabama ===
Game Ten – No. 1 Alabama Crimson Tide (9–0) at Arkansas Razorbacks (3–6)

Quarter	1	2	3	4	Total
No. 1 Crimson Tide	10	28	7	7	52
Razorbacks	3	0	0	0	3

at Donald W. Reynolds Razorback Stadium • Fayetteville, Arkansas

- Date: Saturday, December 12, 2020
- Game time: 11:00 a.m. CST
- Game weather: Cloudy • Temperature: 38 °F (3 °C) • Wind: SE 10 mph
- Referee: Ken Williamson
- TV announcers (ESPN): Bob Wischusen (play-by-play), Dan Orlovsky (analyst), Kris Budden (sideline)

Game information

First quarter

- (10:54) BAMA – Will Reichard 45 yard field goal (Drive: 7 plays, 19 yards, 2:22; Alabama 3–0)
- (7:18) ARK – Matthew Phillips 26 yard field goal (Drive: 11 plays, 66 yards, 3:36; Tied 3–3)
- (2:36) BAMA – DeVonta Smith 84 yard punt return, Will Reichard kick (Alabama 10–3)

Second quarter

- (12:04) BAMA – Najee Harris 1 yard rush, Will Reichard kick (Drive: 8 plays, 49 yards, 3:52; Alabama 17–3)
- (11:50) BAMA – Najee Harris 5 yard rush, Will Reichard kick (Drive: 1 play, 5 yards, 0:04; Alabama 24–3)
- (6:43) BAMA – Brian Robinson Jr. 1 yard rush, Will Reichard kick (Drive: 8 plays, 72 yards, 3:45; Alabama 31–3)
- (0:33) BAMA – Brian Robinson Jr. 4 yard rush, Will Reichard kick (Drive: 13 plays, 70 yards, 4:31; Alabama 38–3)

Third quarter

- (7:24) BAMA – Brian Robinson Jr. 4 yard rush, Will Reichard kick (Drive: 14 plays, 89 yards, 7:36; Alabama 45–3)

Fourth quarter

- (1:51) BAMA – Jase McClellan 80 yard rush, Will Reichard kick (Drive: 1 play, 80 yards, 0:13; Alabama 52–3)

Statistics	BAMA	ARK
First downs	24	13
Plays–yards	71–443	60–188
Rushes–yards	38–216	43–80
Passing yards	227	108
Passing: comp–att–int	27–33–0	9–17–1
Time of possession	33:15	26:45

Team	Category	Player	Statistics
Alabama	Passing	Mac Jones	24/29, 208 yards
Alabama	Rushing	Jase McClellan	6 carries, 95 yards
Alabama	Receiving	John Metchie III	5 receptions, 72 yards
Arkansas	Passing	Feleipe Franks	8/10, 90 yards
Arkansas	Rushing	Trelon Smith	19 carries, 69 yards
Arkansas	Receiving	Michael Woods II	3 receptions, 43 yards

== Statistics ==
=== Team ===
==== Scores by quarter ====
	1	2	3	4	Total
Arkansas	55	74	63	69	261
All opponents	64	122	67	93	346

== Personnel ==
=== Coaching staff ===
Arkansas Razorbacks coaches
Sam Pittman	Head coach	1st
Kendal Briles	Offensive coordinator/quarterbacks coach	1st
Barry Odom	Defensive coordinator/Safeties coach	1st
Scott Fountain	Assistant head coach/Special teams coordinator	1st
Jimmy Smith	Running backs coach	1st
Justin Stepp	Wide receivers coach	3rd
Brad Davis	Offensive line coach	1st
Jon Cooper	Tight ends coach	1st
Rion Rhoades	Linebackers coach	1st
Derrick LeBlanc	Defensive line coach	1st
Sam Carter	Cornerbacks coach	1st
Jamil Walker	Strength and conditioning coach	1st

=== Roster ===
2020 Arkansas Razorbacks football team roster
Players
Coaches
Offense

Pos.	#	Name	Class
QB	1	KJ Jefferson	Fr
QB	2	Malik Hornsby	Fr
RB	3	A'Montae Spivey	Fr
WR	4	Koilan Jackson	Jr
WR	4	Shamar Nash	Fr
RB	5	Rakeem Boyd (C)	Sr
WR	6	Kendall Catalon	Jr
WR	7	Trey Knox	So
WR	8	Michael Woods II	Jr
QB	9	John Stephen Jones	So
WR	10	De'Vion Warren	Sr
WR	11	Jaquayln Crawford	So
QB	13	Feleipe Franks (C)	Sr
QB	14	Cade Pearson	So
QB	15	Braden Bratcher	Fr
WR	16	Treylon Burks	So
WR	17	John David White	Fr
QB	18	Jack Lindsey	Sr
WR	19	Tyson Morris	Sr
RB	20	Dominique Johnson	Fr
RB	22	Trelon Smith	Jr
RB	23	Josh Oglesby	So
RB	32	Reid Turner	Fr
WR	33	Karch Gardiner	Fr
WR	41	T.J. Hammonds	Sr
TE	46	Nathan Bax	Fr
OL	50	Chibueze Nwanna	Sr
OL	51	Ricky Stromberg	So
OL	54	Austin Nix	So
OL	55	Beaux Limmer	Fr
OL	57	Shane Clenin	Jr
OL	59	Griffin Hunt	So
OL	62	Brady Latham	Fr
OL	66	Ty Clary	Sr
OL	67	Payton Simpson	Fr
OL	70	Luke Jones	So
OL	71	Ryan Winkel	So
OL	72	Drew Vest	Fr
OL	73	Noah Gatlin	So
OL	74	Jalen St. John	Fr
OL	75	Ray Curry Jr.	Fr
OL	76	Myron Cunningham	Sr
OL	78	Dalton Wagner	Jr
OL	79	Dylan Rathcke	Fr
TE	80	Collin Sutherland	Fr
WR	81	Darin Turner	Fr
TE	82	Hudson Henry	Fr
TE	83	Marcus Henderson	Fr
WR	85	Harper Cole	Fr
WR	86	Kevin Compton	Fr
TE	87	Blake Kern	Sr
TE	89	Blayne Toll	Fr

Defense

Pos.	#	Name	Class
DB	0	Jerry Jacobs	Sr
DB	1	Jalen Catalon	Fr
DB	2	Myles Slusher	Fr
DB	3	Nick Turner	Fr
DB	4	Malik Chavis	Fr
DB	4	Jarques McClellion	Jr
DL	5	Dorian Gerald	Sr
DB	6	Jacorrei Turner	Fr
DB	7	Joe Foucha	Jr
DB	9	Greg Brooks Jr.	So
LB	10	Bumper Pool	Jr
DL	11	Mataio Soli	So
DL	13	Julius Coates	Jr
DB	14	Nathan Parodi	So
DB	15	Simeon Blair	So
DB	17	Hudson Clark	Fr
DB	18	Myles Mason	Jr
DB	19	Khari Johnson	Fr
DB	20	Jordon Curtis	Jr
DB	21	Montaric Brown	Jr
DB	23	Devin Bush	Fr
DB	24	LaDarrius Bishop	So
LB	25	Zach Zimos	Fr
DB	26	Micahh Smith	Sr
LB	27	Hayden Henry	Sr
LB	28	Andrew Parker	So
LB	29	Asa Shearin	Fr
LB	30	Levi Draper	Jr
LB	31	Grant Morgan (C)	Sr
LB	32	Deon Edwards	Sr
LB	33	Kelin Burrle	Fr
DB	34	Martaveous Brown	Jr
LB	35	Jake Yurachek	So
LB	37	Eric Thomas Jr.	Fr
DB	38	Jon Conley	Fr
DL	42	Jonathan Marshall (C)	Sr
LB	43	Brooks Both	Fr
DL	44	Andy Boykin	Fr
DB	44	Cameron Vail	So
LB	45	Jackson Woodard	Fr
LB	47	Cedric Johnson	So
DL	48	Nicholas Fulwider	So
LB	49	McKinley Williams	So
DL	50	Eric Gregory	Fr
LB	52	J.T. Towers	Fr
DL	56	Zach Williams	So
DL	58	Jashaud Stewart	Fr
DL	90	Marcus Miller	Fr
DL	91	Taurean Carter	Fr
DL	92	Elias Hale	Sr
DL	93	Isaiah Nichols	So
DL	94	David Porter	Jr
DL	95	Morgan Hanna	Fr
DL	97	Xavier Kelly	Sr
DL	99	Enoch Jackson Jr.	Fr

Special teams

Pos.	#	Name	Class
P	28	Reid Bauer	So
K	35	A.J. Reed	Sr
LS	39	H.T. Fountain	Sr
P	40	George Caratan	Jr
P	43	Sam Loy	Sr
LS	48	Jordan Silver	Jr
LS	53	Eli Chism	Fr
LS	53	John Oehrlein	Fr
K/P	80	Matthew Phillips	So
K	90	Vito Calvaruso	Fr

Head coach

- Sam Pittman

Coordinators/assistant coaches

- Barry Odom (AHC/DC/S)
- Scott Fountain (AHC/ST)
- Kendal Briles (OC/QB)
- Sam Carter (CB)
- Jon Cooper (TE)
- Brad Davis (OL)
- Derrick LeBlanc (DL)
- Rion Rhoades (LB)
- Jimmy Smith (RB)
- Justin Stepp (WR)
- Michael Scherer (DA)

Legend

- (C) Team captain
- (S) Suspended
- (I) Ineligible
- Injured
- Redshirt

Roster
Last update: October 7, 2020

=== Recruits ===
The Razorbacks signed a total of 19 recruits from high school and junior college.

College recruiting information
Name	Hometown	School	Height	Weight	Commit date
Myles Slusher; S	Broken Arrow, OK		6 ft 0 in (1.83 m)	180 lb (82 kg)	Dec 18, 2019
Myles Slusher; S	Recruit ratings: Rivals: 247Sports: ESPN:				
Malik Hornsby; QB	Missouri City, TX	Thurgood Marshall	6 ft 2 in (1.88 m)	180 lb (82 kg)	Feb 5, 2020
Malik Hornsby; QB	Recruit ratings: Rivals: 247Sports: ESPN:				
Darin Turner; WR	Memphis, TN	Central	6 ft 3 in (1.91 m)	205 lb (93 kg)	Dec 19, 2019
Darin Turner; WR	Recruit ratings: Rivals: 247Sports: ESPN:				
Jalen St. John; OL	St. Louis, MO	Trinity Catholic	6 ft 5 in (1.96 m)	325 lb (147 kg)	Feb 5, 2020
Jalen St. John; OL	Recruit ratings: Rivals: 247Sports: ESPN:				
Marcus Henderson; OL	Memphis, TN	Memphis University School	6 ft 5 in (1.96 m)	310 lb (140 kg)	Feb 5, 2020
Marcus Henderson; OL	Recruit ratings: Rivals: 247Sports: ESPN:				
Blayne Toll; DE	Hazen, AR		6 ft 5 in (1.96 m)	245 lb (111 kg)	Jun 28, 2019
Blayne Toll; DE	Recruit ratings: Rivals: 247Sports: ESPN:				
Andy Boykin; DT	LaGrange, GA	Troup County	6 ft 3 in (1.91 m)	300 lb (140 kg)	Feb 2, 2020
Andy Boykin; DT	Recruit ratings: Rivals: 247Sports: ESPN:				
Ray Curry; OL	Memphis, TN	White Station	6 ft 6 in (1.98 m)	315 lb (143 kg)	Dec 18, 2019
Ray Curry; OL	Recruit ratings: Rivals: 247Sports: ESPN:				
Jashaud Stewart; LB	Jonesboro, AR		6 ft 2 in (1.88 m)	225 lb (102 kg)	Mar 9, 2019
Jashaud Stewart; LB	Recruit ratings: Rivals: 247Sports: ESPN:				
Kelin Burrle; LB	Harvey, LA	Helen Cox	6 ft 0 in (1.83 m)	205 lb (93 kg)	Dec 18, 2019
Kelin Burrle; LB	Recruit ratings: Rivals: 247Sports: ESPN:				
Julius Coates; DE	Rockford, IL	East Mississippi C.C.	6 ft 6 in (1.98 m)	270 lb (120 kg)	Dec 19, 2019
Julius Coates; DE	Recruit ratings: Rivals: 247Sports: ESPN:				
Nick Turner; S	New Orleans, LA	Brother Martin	5 ft 11 in (1.80 m)	180 lb (82 kg)	Jan 3, 2020
Nick Turner; S	Recruit ratings: Rivals: 247Sports: ESPN:				
Eric Thomas; DE	Pensacola, FL	Booker T. Washington	6 ft 3 in (1.91 m)	230 lb (100 kg)	Jan 18, 2020
Eric Thomas; DE	Recruit ratings: Rivals: 247Sports: ESPN:				
Jacorrei Turner; LB	Atlanta, GA	Woodward Academy	6 ft 2 in (1.88 m)	205 lb (93 kg)	Jan 18, 2020
Jacorrei Turner; LB	Recruit ratings: Rivals: 247Sports: ESPN:				
Jaqualin McGhee; DE	Fort Valley, GA	Peach County	6 ft 4 in (1.93 m)	255 lb (116 kg)	Dec 28, 2019
Jaqualin McGhee; DE	Recruit ratings: Rivals: 247Sports: ESPN:				
Dominique Johnson; RB	Crowley, TX		6 ft 1 in (1.85 m)	230 lb (100 kg)	Dec 18, 2019
Dominique Johnson; RB	Recruit ratings: Rivals: 247Sports: ESPN:				
J.T. Towers; LB	Little Rock, AR	Joe T. Robinson	6 ft 4 in (1.93 m)	210 lb (95 kg)	Jan 6, 2020
J.T. Towers; LB	Recruit ratings: Rivals: 247Sports: ESPN:				
Collin Sutherland; TE	Flower Mound, TX	Edward S. Marcus	6 ft 5 in (1.96 m)	235 lb (107 kg)	Feb 4, 2020
Collin Sutherland; TE	Recruit ratings: Rivals: 247Sports: ESPN:				
Khari Johnson; CB	Suffield, CT	Suffield Academy	6 ft 0 in (1.83 m)	185 lb (84 kg)	Jan 18, 2020
Khari Johnson; CB	Recruit ratings: Rivals: 247Sports: ESPN:				
Overall recruit ranking:
Note: In many cases, Scout, Rivals, 247Sports, On3, and ESPN may conflict in their listings of height and weight.; In these cases, the average was taken. ESPN grades are on a 100-point scale.; Sources: "Arkansas Football Commitments". Rivals.; "2020 Team Ranking". Rivals.com.

=== Transfers ===
Arkansas signed six transfers in 2020.

Pos.	Player	Former school	Year	Source
QB	Feleipe Franks	Florida	Senior	
LB	Levi Draper	Oklahoma	(redshirt) Junior	
DT	Xavier Kelly	Clemson	Senior	
CB	Jerry Jacobs	Arkansas State	(redshirt) Junior	
PK	A.J. Reed	Duke	Senior	
P	George Caratan	Michigan	(redshirt) Sophomore	

== Players drafted into the NFL ==
Round	Pick	Player	Position	NFL club
6	207	Jonathan Marshall	DT	New York Jets
