= 2020 Ole Miss Rebels football team =

American college football season

2020 Ole Miss Rebels football

Outback Bowl champion

Outback Bowl, W 26–20 vs. Indiana
- Conference: Southeastern Conference
- Western Division
- Record: 5–5 (4–5 SEC)
- Head coach: Lane Kiffin (1st season)
- Offensive coordinator: Jeff Lebby (1st season)
- Offensive scheme: Veer and shoot
- Co-defensive coordinators: D. J. Durkin (1st season); Chris Partridge (1st season)
- Base defense: 4–3
- Home stadium: Vaught–Hemingway Stadium

2020 Southeastern Conference football standings
	Conf.			Overall
Team	W		L	W		L
Eastern Division
No. 13 Florida x	8	–	2	8	–	4
No. 7 Georgia	7	–	2	8	–	2
Missouri	5	–	5	5	–	5
Kentucky	4	–	6	5	–	6
Tennessee*	3	–	7	3	–	7
South Carolina	2	–	8	2	–	8
Vanderbilt	0	–	9	0	–	9
Western Division
No. 1 Alabama x$#^	10	–	0	13	–	0
No. 4 Texas A&M	8	–	1	9	–	1
Auburn	6	–	4	6	–	5
LSU*	5	–	5	5	–	5
Ole Miss	4	–	5	5	–	5
Arkansas	3	–	7	3	–	7
Mississippi State	3	–	7	4	–	7
Championship: Alabama 52, Florida 46
# – College Football Playoff champion; ^ – College Football Playoff participant; $ – Conference champion; x – Division champion/co-champions; * – Tennessee vacated all wins due to NCAA violations. LSU was ineligible for postseason due to self imposed ban. Note: Due to COVID-19, the SEC played a conference-only schedule.; Rankings from AP Poll.

The 2020 Ole Miss Rebels football team represented the University of Mississippi in the 2020 NCAA Division I FBS football season. The Rebels played their home games at Vaught–Hemingway Stadium in Oxford, Mississippi, and competed in the Western Division of the Southeastern Conference (SEC). They were led by first-year head coach Lane Kiffin.

== Preseason ==
=== Award watch lists ===
Listed in the order that they were released

=== SEC Media Days ===
In the preseason media poll, Ole Miss was predicted to finish in a tie for fifth place in the West Division.

=== Recruiting ===
College recruiting information (2020)
Name	Hometown	School	Height	Weight	Commit date
Demon Clowney; DE	Baltimore, MD	St. Frances Academy	6 ft 4 in (1.93 m)	225 lb (102 kg)	Jan 20, 2020
Demon Clowney; DE	Recruit ratings: Scout: Rivals: 247Sports: ESPN:				
Henry Parrish; RB	Miami, FL	Columbus	5 ft 10 in (1.78 m)	183 lb (83 kg)	Jan 19, 2020
Henry Parrish; RB	Recruit ratings: Scout: Rivals: 247Sports: ESPN:				
Marc Britt; ATH	Miami, FL	Miami Christian School	6 ft 2 in (1.88 m)	190 lb (86 kg)	Feb 20, 2020
Marc Britt; ATH	Recruit ratings: Scout: Rivals: 247Sports: ESPN:				
Jakivuan Brown; OLB	Horn Lake, MS	Horn Lake	6 ft 3 in (1.91 m)	235 lb (107 kg)	Aug 1, 2019
Jakivuan Brown; OLB	Recruit ratings: Scout: Rivals: 247Sports: ESPN:				
Eli Acker; OT	Columbus, MS	Heritage Academy	6 ft 6 in (1.98 m)	285 lb (129 kg)	May 5, 2018
Eli Acker; OT	Recruit ratings: Scout: Rivals: 247Sports: ESPN:				
Kentrel Bullock; RB	Columbia, MS	Columbia	5 ft 10 in (1.78 m)	195 lb (88 kg)	Dec 16, 2019
Kentrel Bullock; RB	Recruit ratings: Scout: Rivals: 247Sports: ESPN:				
Derek Bermudez; S	Jacksonville, FL	Sandalwood	6 ft 1 in (1.85 m)	180 lb (82 kg)	Dec 18, 2019
Derek Bermudez; S	Recruit ratings: Scout: Rivals: 247Sports: ESPN:				
Lakevias Daniel; CB	Louisville, MS	Jones County JC	6 ft 0 in (1.83 m)	177 lb (80 kg)	Dec 18, 2019
Lakevias Daniel; CB	Recruit ratings: Scout: Rivals: 247Sports: ESPN:				
Austin Keys; ILB	Seminary, MS	Seminary	6 ft 2 in (1.88 m)	241 lb (109 kg)	Mar 24, 2019
Austin Keys; ILB	Recruit ratings: Scout: Rivals: 247Sports: ESPN:				
Tobias Braun; OT	Freiburg im Breisgau, Germany	Salisbury School	6 ft 7 in (2.01 m)	306 lb (139 kg)	Dec 18, 2019
Tobias Braun; OT	Recruit ratings: Scout: Rivals: 247Sports: ESPN:				
DeSanto Rollins; DT	Baton Rouge, LA	Parkview Baptist	6 ft 4 in (1.93 m)	282 lb (128 kg)	Jun 18, 2019
DeSanto Rollins; DT	Recruit ratings: Scout: Rivals: 247Sports: ESPN:				
DaMarcus Thomas; TE	Saraland, AL	Saraland	6 ft 2 in (1.88 m)	228 lb (103 kg)	Jun 7, 2019
DaMarcus Thomas; TE	Recruit ratings: Scout: Rivals: 247Sports: ESPN:				
Cedric Johnson; DE	Mobile, AL	Davidson	6 ft 3 in (1.91 m)	225 lb (102 kg)	Jun 15, 2019
Cedric Johnson; DE	Recruit ratings: Scout: Rivals: 247Sports: ESPN:				
Luke Shouse; OT	Brentwood, TN	Ravenwood	6 ft 6 in (1.98 m)	255 lb (116 kg)	Jun 9, 2019
Luke Shouse; OT	Recruit ratings: Scout: Rivals: 247Sports: ESPN:				
Kade Renfro; QB	Stephenville, TX	Stephenville	6 ft 4 in (1.93 m)	189 lb (86 kg)	Dec 15, 2019
Kade Renfro; QB	Recruit ratings: Scout: Rivals: 247Sports: ESPN:				
Daylen Gill; S	Louisville, MS	Jones County JC	6 ft 0 in (1.83 m)	234 lb (106 kg)	Dec 9, 2019
Daylen Gill; S	Recruit ratings: Scout: Rivals: 247Sports: ESPN:				
Cedric Melton; OT	Houston, TX	Klein Cain	6 ft 4 in (1.93 m)	189 lb (86 kg)	Feb 5, 2020
Cedric Melton; OT	Recruit ratings: Scout: Rivals: 247Sports: ESPN:				
Overall recruit ranking:
Note: In many cases, Scout, Rivals, 247Sports, On3, and ESPN may conflict in their listings of height and weight.; In these cases, the average was taken. ESPN grades are on a 100-point scale.; Sources: "2020 Team Ranking". Rivals.com.

==== Incoming transfers ====
Name	Pos.	Year	Hometown	Previous School
Otis Reese	DB	Junior	Leesburg, GA	Georgia, redshirted first seven games during 2020 season.
Tavius Robinson	DL	Junior	Guelph, ON	Guelph, will be eligible to play in 2020 since U Sports canceled their 2020 season.
Kenny Yeboah	TE	RS Senior	Allentown, PA	Temple, will be eligible to play in 2020 since Yeboah graduated from Temple University.
Jacob Springer	LB	Senior	Kansas City, MO	Navy, will redshirt during 2020 season.
Deane Leonard	DB	Senior	Calgary, AB	Calgary, will be eligible to play in 2020 since U Sports canceled their 2020 season.

== Schedule ==
Ole Miss had games scheduled against Baylor (Texas Kickoff), Georgia Southern, Southeast Missouri State, and UConn, but were canceled due to the response to the COVID-19 pandemic.

Date	Time	Opponent	Site	TV	Result	Attendance
September 26	11:00 a.m.	No. 5 Florida	Vaught–Hemingway Stadium; Oxford, MS	ESPN	L 35–51	13,926
October 3	3:00 p.m.	at Kentucky	Kroger Field; Lexington, KY	SECN	W 42–41 ^{OT}	12,000
October 10	6:30 p.m.	No. 2 Alabama	Vaught–Hemingway Stadium; Oxford, MS (rivalry)	ESPN	L 48–63	14,419
October 17	2:30 p.m.	at Arkansas	Donald W. Reynolds Razorback Stadium; Fayetteville, AR (rivalry)	SECN	L 21–33	16,500
October 24	11:00 a.m.	Auburn	Vaught–Hemingway Stadium; Oxford, MS (rivalry)	SECN	L 28–35	15,037
October 31	3:00 p.m.	at Vanderbilt	Vanderbilt Stadium; Nashville, TN (rivalry)	SECN	W 54–21	840
November 14	6:30 p.m.	South Carolina	Vaught–Hemingway Stadium; Oxford, MS	SECN	W 59–42	13,596
November 28	3:00 p.m.	Mississippi State	Vaught–Hemingway Stadium; Oxford, MS (Egg Bowl)	SECN	W 31–24	16,218
December 19	2:30 p.m.	at LSU	Tiger Stadium; Baton Rouge, LA (Magnolia Bowl)	SECN	L 48–53	21,905
January 2, 2021	11:30 a.m.	vs. No. 11 Indiana*	Raymond James Stadium; Tampa, FL (Outback Bowl)	ABC	W 26–20	11,025
*Non-conference game; Rankings from AP Poll and CFP Rankings (after November 24) released prior to game; All times are in Central time

Schedule source:

== Game summaries ==
=== No. 5 Florida ===
Uniform Combination
Helmet	Jersey	Pants

No. 5 Florida Gators (0–0) at Ole Miss Rebels (0–0)

Quarter	1	2	3	4	Total
No. 5 Gators	14	14	13	10	51
Rebels	7	7	7	14	35

at Vaught–Hemingway Stadium • Oxford, MS

- Date: Saturday, September 26, 2020
- Game time: 11:00 a.m. CST
- Game weather: Overcast • Temperature: 70 °F (21 °C)
- Game attendance: 13,926
- Referee: Marc Curles
- TV announcers (ESPN):
  Joe Tessitore (play-by-play)
  Greg McElroy (color)
  Marty Smith (sideline)

Game information

First Quarter

- (5:48) FLA – Kyle Pitts 1 yard pass from Kyle Trask, Evan McPherson kick
  Florida 7–0; 13 plays, 77 yards, 4:48
- (3:43) MISS – Dontario Drummond 46 yard pass from Matt Corral, Luke Logan kick
  Tied 7–7; 7 plays, 75 yards, 2:05
- (5:48) FLA – Trevon Grimes 22 yard pass from Kyle Trask, Evan McPherson kick
  Florida 14–7; 4 plays, 82 yards, 1:36

Second Quarter

- (12:04) MISS – Dontario Drummond 14 yard pass from Matt Corral, Luke Logan kick
  Tied 14–14; 11 plays, 75 yards, 3:46
- (3:10) FLA – Kadarius Toney 16 yard pass from Kyle Trask, Evan McPherson kick
  Florida 21–14; 9 plays, 78 yards, 4:19
- (0:05) FLA – Kyle Pitts 16 yard pass from Kyle Trask, Evan McPherson kick
  Florida 28–14; 8 plays, 81 yards, 1:49

Third Quarter

- (14:19) FLA – Kyle Pitts 71 yard pass from Kyle Trask, Evan McPherson kick
  Florida 35–14; 2 plays, 75 yards, 0:41
- (13:43) MISS – Jerrion Ealy 18 yard rush, Luke Logan kick
  Florida 35–21; 2 plays, 75 yards, 0:36
- (9:30) FLA – Evan McPherson 55 yard field goal
  Florida 38–21; 8 plays, 38 yards, 4:13
- (5:06) FLA – Evan McPherson 37 yard field goal
  Florida 41–21; 6 plays, 56 yards, 2:15

Fourth Quarter

- (12:54) FLA – Evan McPherson 23 yard field goal
  Florida 44–21; 11 plays, 66 yards, 5:04
- (11:00) MISS – Kenny Yeboah 8 yard pass from Matt Corral, Two-point conversion
  Florida 44–29; 5 plays, 81 yards, 1:54
- (5:14) FLA – Kyle Pitts 17 yard pass from Kyle Trask, Evan McPherson kick
  Florida 51–29; 10 plays, 75 yards, 5:46
- (0:58) MISS – Snoop Conner 1 yard rush, Two-point conversion failed
  Florida 51–35; 16 plays, 75 yards, 4:16

Statistics	FLA	MISS
First downs	32	29
Total yards	642	613
Passing yards	446	443
Rushing yards	196	170
Penalties	4–40	4–45
Turnovers	1	1
Time of possession	33:29	26:31

Team	Category	Player	Statistics
Florida	Passing	Kyle Trask	30/42, 416 yards, 6 TD
Florida	Rushing	Kadarius Toney	2 carries, 55 yards
Florida	Receiving	Kyle Pitts	8 receptions, 170 yards, 4 TD
Ole Miss	Passing	Matt Corral	22/31, 395 yards, 3 TD, 1 INT
Ole Miss	Rushing	Jerrion Ealy	16 carries, 79 yards, 1 TD
Ole Miss	Receiving	Elijah Moore	10 receptions, 227 yards

=== At Kentucky ===
Uniform Combination
Helmet	Jersey	Pants

Ole Miss Rebels (0–1) at Kentucky Wildcats (0–1)

Quarter	1	2	3	4	OT	Total
Rebels	7	7	7	14	7	42
Wildcats	14	7	7	7	6	41

at Kroger Field • Lexington, KY

- Date: Saturday, October 3, 2020
- Game time: 3:00 p.m. CST (4:00 p.m. local EST)
- Game weather: Sunny • Temperature: 64 °F (18 °C)
- Game attendance: 12,000
- Referee: David Smith
- TV announcers (SECN):
  Taylor Zarzour (play-by-play)
  Matt Stinchcomb (color)
  Taylor McGregor (sideline)

Game information

First Quarter

- (12:38) MISS – Jerrion Ealy 1 yard rush, Luke Logan kick
  Ole Miss 7–0; 8 plays, 75 yards, 2:22
- (7:36) UK – Terry Wilson 4 yard rush, Matt Ruffolo kick
  Tied 7–7; 4 plays, 29 yards, 1:54
- (1:33) UK – A. J. Rose 2 yard rush, Matt Ruffolo kick
  Kentucky 14–7; 8 plays, 80 yards, 4:25

Second Quarter

- (13:19) MISS – Kenny Yeboah 14 yard pass from Matt Corral, Luke Logan kick
  Tied 14–14; 10 plays, 75 yards, 3:14
- (0:29) UK – Terry Wilson 22 yard rush, Matt Ruffolo kick
  Kentucky 21–14; 9 plays, 83 yards, 3:25

Third Quarter

- (10:41) UK – Chris Rodriguez Jr. 22 yard rush, Matt Ruffolo kick
  Kentucky 28–14; 10 plays, 75 yards, 4:19
- (9:17) MISS – Jonathan Mingo 24 yard pass from Matt Corral, Luke Logan kick
  Kentucky 28–21; 4 plays, 75 yards, 1:24

Fourth Quarter

- (13:37) MISS – Jonathan Mingo 16 yard pass from Matt Corral, Luke Logan kick
  Tied 28–28; 5 plays, 54 yards, 1:30
- (8:23) MISS – Snoop Conner 1 yard rush, Luke Logan kick
  Ole Miss 35–28; 3 plays, 53 yards, 0:47
- (2:04) UK – Chris Rodriguez Jr. 1 yard rush, Matt Ruffolo kick
  Tied 35–35; 12 plays, 75 yards, 6:19

Overtime

- UK – Terry Wilson 10 yard rush, PAT missed
  Kentucky 41–35; 3 plays, 25 yards
- MISS – Elijah Moore 3 yard pass from Matt Corral, Luke Logan kick
  Ole Miss 42–41; 4 plays, 25 yards

Statistics	MISS	UK
First downs	26	26
Total yards	459	559
Passing yards	320	151
Rushing yards	139	408
Penalties	5–33	8–81
Turnovers	0	1
Time of possession	23:55	36:05

Team	Category	Player	Statistics
Ole Miss	Passing	Matt Corral	24/29, 320 yards, 4 TD
Ole Miss	Rushing	Matt Corral	13 carries, 51 yards
Ole Miss	Receiving	Jonathan Mingo	8 receptions, 128 yards, 2 TD
Kentucky	Passing	Terry Wilson	14/18, 151 yards
Kentucky	Rushing	Chris Rodriguez Jr.	17 carries, 133 yards, 2 TD
Kentucky	Receiving	Josh Ali	7 receptions, 88 yards

=== No. 2 Alabama ===
Uniform Combination
Helmet	Jersey	Pants

No. 2 Alabama Crimson Tide (2–0) at Ole Miss Rebels (1–1)

Quarter	1	2	3	4	Total
No. 2 Crimson Tide	7	14	21	21	63
Rebels	7	14	14	13	48

at Vaught–Hemingway Stadium • Oxford, MS

- Date: Saturday, October 10, 2020
- Game time: 6:30 p.m. CST
- Game weather: Clear Skies • Temperature: 68 °F (20 °C)
- Game attendance: 14,419
- Referee: Matt Loeffler
- TV announcers (ESPN):
  Sean McDonough (play-by-play)
  Todd Blackledge (color)
  Todd McShay (sideline)
  Molly McGrath (sideline)

Game information

First Quarter

- (14:06) MISS – Kenny Yeboah 6 yard pass from Matt Corral, Luke Logan kick
  Ole Miss 7–0; 4 plays, 75 yards, 0:54
- (9:29) ALA – DeVonta Smith 14 yard pass from Mac Jones, Will Reichard kick
  Tied 7–7; 10 plays, 85 yards, 4:37

Second Quarter

- (13:31) MISS – Jerrion Ealy 3 yard rush, Luke Logan kick
  Ole Miss 14–7; 10 plays, 93 yards, 3:45
- (6:51) ALA – Brian Robinson Jr. 1 yard rush, Will Reichard kick
  Tied 14–14; 6 plays, 72 yards, 2:31
- (3:15) MISS – Snoop Conner 3 yard rush, Luke Logan kick
  Ole Miss 21–14; 11 plays, 75 yards, 3:36
- (1:00) ALA – Najee Harris 5 yard rush, Will Reichard kick
  Tied 21–21; 8 plays, 75 yards, 2:15

Third Quarter

- (13:45) ALA – Najee Harris 33 yard rush, Will Reichard kick
  Alabama 28–21; 4 plays, 85 yards, 1:15
- (12:47) MISS – Kenny Yeboah 68 yard pass from Matt Corral, Luke Logan kick
  Tied 28–28; 3 plays, 79 yards, 0:58
- (10:19) ALA – Miller Forristall 3 yard pass from Mac Jones, Will Reichard kick
  Alabama 35–28; 6 plays, 52 yards, 2:28
- (6:19) MISS – Jerrion Ealy 9 yard rush, Luke Logan kick
  Tied 35–35; 10 plays, 75 yards, 4:00
- (2:39) ALA – Najee Harris 3 yard rush, Will Reichard kick
  Alabama 42–35; 7 plays, 72 yards, 3:40

Fourth Quarter

- (11:31) MISS – Snoop Conner 1 yard rush, Luke Logan kick
  Tied 42–42; 16 plays, 75 yards, 6:08
- (10:00) ALA – Najee Harris 16 yard rush, Will Reichard kick
  Alabama 49–42; 4 plays, 44 yards, 1:31
- (7:01) MISS – Luke Logan 39 yard kick
  Alabama 49–45; 8 plays, 54 yards, 2:59
- (3:16) ALA – DeVonta Smith 14 yard rush, Will Reichard kick
  Alabama 56–45; 8 plays, 90 yards, 3:45
- (1:29) MISS – Luke Logan 29 yard kick
  Alabama 56–48; 7 plays, 64 yards, 1:47
- (1:09) ALA – Najee Harris 39 yard rush, Will Reichard kick
  Alabama 63–48; 3 plays, 44 yards, 0:20

Statistics	ALA	MISS
First downs	37	31
Total yards	723	*647
Passing yards	417	379
Rushing yards	306	268
Penalties	8–76	6–67
Turnovers	1	0
Time of possession	28:45	31:15

Team	Category	Player	Statistics
Alabama	Passing	Mac Jones	28/32, 417 yards, 2 TD
Alabama	Rushing	Najee Harris	23 carries, 206 yards, 5 TD
Alabama	Receiving	DeVonta Smith	13 receptions, 164 yards, 1 TD
Ole Miss	Passing	Matt Corral	21/28, 365 yards, 2 TD
Ole Miss	Rushing	Snoop Conner	21 carries, 128 yards, 2 TD
Ole Miss	Receiving	Kenny Yeboah	7 receptions, 181 yards, 2 TD

*The most total yards ever to be gained against an Alabama football team in team history

=== At Arkansas ===
Uniform Combination
Helmet	Jersey	Pants

Ole Miss Rebels (1–2) at Arkansas Razorbacks (1–2)

Quarter	1	2	3	4	Total
Rebels	0	0	7	14	21
Razorbacks	7	13	0	13	33

at Donald W. Reynolds Razorback Stadium • Fayetteville, AR

- Date: Saturday, October 17, 2020
- Game time: 2:30 p.m. CST
- Game weather: Fair • Temperature: 67 °F (19 °C)
- Game attendance: 16,500
- Referee: James Carter
- TV announcers (SECN):
  Dave Flemming (play-by-play)
  Rod Gilmore (color)
  Tera Talmadge (sideline)

Game information

First Quarter

- (5:47) ARK – Rakeem Boyd 1 yard rush, A. J. Reed kick
  Arkansas 7–0; 11 plays, 95 yards, 4:11

Second Quarter

- (10:50) ARK – A. J. Reed 23 yard kick
  Arkansas 10–0; 7 plays, 42 yards, 2:25
- (10:40) ARK – Jalen Catalon 35 yard interception return, A. J. Reed kick
  Arkansas 17–0
- (1:41) ARK – A. J. Reed 32 yard kick
  Arkansas 20–0; 12 plays, 50 yards, 3:21

Third Quarter

- (4:35) MISS – Elijah Moore 7 yard pass from Matt Corral, Luke Logan kick
  Arkansas 20–7; 10 plays, 56 yards, 4:07

Fourth Quarter

- (12:06) MISS – Jonathan Mingo 21 yard pass from Matt Corral, Luke Logan kick
  Arkansas 20–14; 8 plays, 66 yards, 2:34
- (7:36) ARK – Treylon Burks 7 yard pass from Feleipe Franks, Two-point conversion failed
  Arkansas 26–14; 11 plays, 70 yards, 4:30
- (5:30) MISS – Jerrion Ealy 1 yard rush, Luke Logan kick
  Arkansas 26–21; 7 plays, 73 yards, 2:06
- (3:07) ARK – Grant Morgan 23 yard interception return, A. J. Reed kick
  Arkansas 33–21

Statistics	MISS	ARK
First downs	23	24
Total yards	442	394
Passing yards	200	244
Rushing yards	242	150
Penalties	6–35	3–15
Turnovers	7	2
Time of possession	29:31	30:29

Team	Category	Player	Statistics
Ole Miss	Passing	Matt Corral	20/38, 200 yards, 2 TD, 6 INT
Ole Miss	Rushing	Jerrion Ealy	23 carries, 112 yards, 1 TD
Ole Miss	Receiving	Elijah Moore	11 receptions, 113 yards, 1 TD
Arkansas	Passing	Feleipe Franks	21/34, 244 yards, 1 TD, 1 INT
Arkansas	Rushing	Trelon Smith	15 carries, 54 yards
Arkansas	Receiving	Treylon Burks	11 receptions, 137 yards, 1 TD

=== Auburn ===
Uniform Combination
Helmet	Jersey	Pants

Auburn Tigers (2–2) at Ole Miss Rebels (1–3)

Quarter	1	2	3	4	Total
Tigers	7	7	7	14	35
Rebels	0	14	7	7	28

at Vaught–Hemingway Stadium • Oxford, MS

- Date: Saturday, October 24, 2020
- Game time: 11:00 a.m. CST
- Game weather: Cloudy • Temperature: 52 °F (11 °C)
- Game attendance: 15,037
- Referee: Marc Curles
- TV announcers (SECN):
  Tom Hart (play-by-play)
  Jordan Rodgers (color)
  Cole Cubelic (sideline)

Game information

First Quarter

- (2:17) AUB – Tank Bigsby 4 yard rush, Anders Carlson kick
  Auburn 7–0; 14 plays, 95 yards, 5:53

Second Quarter

- (13:46) MISS – Elijah Moore 6 yard pass from Matt Corral, Luke Logan kick
  Tied 7–7; 10 plays, 75 yards, 3:31
- (9:11) AUB – Bo Nix 4 yard rush, Anders Carlson kick
  Auburn 14–7; 10 plays, 79 yards, 4:28
- (3:35) MISS – Matt Corral 5 yard rush, Luke Logan kick
  Tied 14–14; 16 plays, 78 yards, 5:31

Third Quarter

- (7:09) MISS – Matt Corral 10 yard rush, Luke Logan kick
  Ole Miss 21–14; 3 plays, 89 yards, 0:34
- (2:57) AUB – Shaun Shivers 1 yard rush, Anders Carlson kick
  Tied 21–21; 10 plays, 88 yards, 4:04

Fourth Quarter

- (10:12) AUB – Tank Bigsby 18 yard rush, PAT failed
  Auburn 27–21; 11 plays, 80 yards, 5:08
- (5:43) MISS – Jerrion Ealy 5 yard rush, Luke Logan kick
  Ole Miss 28–27; 13 plays, 77 yards, 4:21
- (1:11) AUB – Seth Williams 58 yard pass from Bo Nix, Two-point conversion
  Auburn 35–28; 6 plays, 80 yards, 1:14

Statistics	AUB	MISS
First downs	26	25
Total yards	462	444
Passing yards	238	161
Rushing yards	224	283
Penalties	3–35	1–5
Turnovers	0	2
Time of possession	31:48	28:12

Team	Category	Player	Statistics
Auburn	Passing	Bo Nix	23/30, 238 yards, 1 TD
Auburn	Rushing	Tank Bigsby	24 carries, 129 yards, 2 TD
Auburn	Receiving	Seth Williams	8 receptions, 150 yards, 1 TD
Ole Miss	Passing	Matt Corral	16/27, 154 yards, 1 TD, 2 INT
Ole Miss	Rushing	Matt Corral	10 carries, 88 yards, 2 TD
Ole Miss	Receiving	Kenny Yeboah	4 receptions, 83 yards

=== At Vanderbilt ===
Uniform Combination
Helmet	Jersey	Pants

Ole Miss Rebels (1–4) at Vanderbilt Commodores (0–3)

Quarter	1	2	3	4	Total
Rebels	21	12	21	0	54
Commodores	0	14	0	7	21

at Vanderbilt Stadium • Nashville, TN

- Date: Saturday, October 31, 2020
- Game time: 3:00 p.m. CST (4:00 p.m. local EST)
- Game weather: Sunny • Temperature: 66 °F (19 °C)
- Game attendance: 840
- Referee: Steve Marlowe
- TV announcers (SECN):
  Dave Neal (play-by-play)
  D.J. Shockley (color)
  Tera Talmadge (sideline)

Game information

First Quarter

- (11:41) MISS – Snoop Conner 1 yard rush, Luke Logan kick
  Ole Miss 7–0; 10 plays, 71 yards, 3:19
- (2:49) MISS – Kenny Yeboah 9 yard pass from Matt Corral, Luke Logan kick
  Ole Miss 14–0; 11 plays, 93 yards, 4:13
- (0:49) MISS – Elijah Moore 36 yard pass from Matt Corral, Luke Logan kick
  Ole Miss 21–0; 1 play, 36 yards, 0:09

Second Quarter

- (12:08) VAN – Ben Bresnahan 43 yard pass from Ken Seals, Wes Farley kick
  Ole Miss 21–7; 8 plays, 92 yards, 3:35
- (8:26) MISS – Elijah Moore 1 yard pass from Matt Corral, kick failed
  Ole Miss 27–7; 8 plays, 77 yards, 3:34
- (1:58) MISS – Elijah Moore 28 yard pass from Matt Corral, Two-point conversion failed
  Ole Miss 33–7; 11 plays, 88 yards, 3:55
- (0:23) VAN – Chris Pierce 16 yard pass from Ken Seals, Wes Farley kick
  Ole Miss 33–14; 8 plays, 75 yards, 1:35

Third Quarter

- (8:49) MISS – Dontario Drummond 14 yard pass from Matt Corral, Two-point conversion
  Ole Miss 41–14; 8 plays, 91 yards, 2:42
- (7:06) MISS – Kenny Yeboah 9 yard pass from Matt Corral, Luke Logan kick
  Ole Miss 48–14; 4 plays, 21 yards, 1:34
- (0:37) MISS – Braylon Sanders 37 yard pass from John Rhys Plumlee, kick failed
  Ole Miss 54–14; 9 plays, 88 yards, 3:24

Fourth Quarter

- (4:28) VAN – Keyon Henry-Brooks 1 yard rush, Wes Farley kick
  Ole Miss 54–21; 16 plays, 75 yards, 5:22

Statistics	MISS	VAN
First downs	35	24
Total yards	645	421
Passing yards	449	319
Rushing yards	196	102
Penalties	8–75	6–50
Turnovers	1	3
Time of possession	29:52	30:08

Team	Category	Player	Statistics
Ole Miss	Passing	Matt Corral	31/34, 412 yards, 6 TD
Ole Miss	Rushing	Jerrion Ealy	15 carries, 95 yards
Ole Miss	Receiving	Elijah Moore	14 receptions, 238 yards, 3 TD
Vanderbilt	Passing	Ken Seals	31/40, 319 yards, 2 TD, 1 INT
Vanderbilt	Rushing	Keyon Henry-Brooks	23 carries, 66 yards, 1 TD
Vanderbilt	Receiving	Cam Johnson	14 receptions, 97 yards

=== South Carolina ===
Uniform Combination
Helmet	Jersey	Pants

South Carolina Gamecocks (2–4) at Ole Miss Rebels (2–4)

Quarter	1	2	3	4	Total
Gamecocks	7	14	14	7	42
Rebels	14	10	14	21	59

at Vaught–Hemingway Stadium • Oxford, MS

- Date: Saturday, November 14, 2020
- Game time: 6:30 p.m. CST
- Game weather: Clear • Temperature: 68 °F (20 °C)
- Game attendance: 13,596
- Referee: David Smith
- TV announcers (SECN):
  Tom Hart (play-by-play)
  Jordan Rodgers (color)
  Cole Cubelic (sideline)

Game information

First Quarter

- (9:24) SC – Shi Smith 11 yard pass from Collin Hill, Parker White kick
  South Carolina 7–0; 10 plays, 75 yards, 5:36
- (4:45) MISS – Dontario Drummond 3 yard pass from Matt Corral, Luke Logan kick
  Tied 7–7; 14 plays, 57 yards, 4:32
- (0:47) MISS – Matt Corral 3 yard rush, Luke Logan kick
  Ole Miss 14–7; 8 plays, 63 yards, 3:20

Second Quarter

- (14:18) SC – Kevin Harris 46 yard rush, Parker White kick
  Tied 14–14; 4 plays, 75 yards, 1:29
- (9:38) MISS – Jerrion Ealy 15 yard pass from Matt Corral, Luke Logan kick
  Ole Miss 21–14; 11 plays, 57 yards, 4:40
- (3:36) SC – Kevin Harris 1 yard rush, Parker White kick
  Tied 21–21; 10 plays, 79 yards, 5:54
- (0:01) MISS – Luke Logan 22 yard kick
  Ole Miss 24–21; 5 plays, 57 yards, 0:44

Third Quarter

- (10:34) MISS – Snoop Conner 2 yard rush, Luke Logan kick
  Ole Miss 31–21; 12 plays, 75 yards, 4:26
- (5:39) SC – Kevin Harris 1 yard rush, Parker White kick
  Ole Miss 31–28; 10 plays, 75 yards, 4:50
- (2:59) SC – Kevin Harris 44 yard rush, Parker White kick
  South Carolina 35–31; 2 plays, 76 yards, 0:55
- (1:11) MISS – Jerrion Ealy 12 yard rush, Luke Logan kick
  Ole Miss 38–35; 4 plays, 75 yards, 1:48

Fourth Quarter

- (12:50) SC – Kevin Harris 12 yard rush, Parker White kick
  South Carolina 42–38; 7 plays, 75 yards, 3:21
- (12:02) MISS – Elijah Moore 91 yard pass from Matt Corral, Luke Logan kick
  Ole Miss 45–42; 2 plays, 94 yards, 0:45
- (6:09) MISS – Jerrion Ealy 5 yard rush, Luke Logan kick
  Ole Miss 52–42; 8 plays, 80 yards, 3:08
- (3:40) MISS – Elijah Moore 25 yard pass from Matt Corral, Casey Griffith kick
  Ole Miss 59–42; 4 plays, 24 yards, 1:40

Statistics	SC	MISS
First downs	27	31
Total yards	548	708
Passing yards	230	513
Rushing yards	318	195
Penalties	4–53	6–45
Turnovers	1	1
Time of possession	29:19	30:41

Team	Category	Player	Statistics
South Carolina	Passing	Collin Hill	17/28, 230 yards, 1 TD, 1 INT
South Carolina	Rushing	Kevin Harris	25 carries, 243 yards, 5 TD
South Carolina	Receiving	Shi Smith	10 receptions, 117 yards, 1 TD
Ole Miss	Passing	Matt Corral	28/32, 513 yards, 4 TD
Ole Miss	Rushing	Jerrion Ealy	17 carries, 84 yards, 2 TD
Ole Miss	Receiving	Elijah Moore	13 receptions, 225 yards, 2 TD

=== Mississippi State ===
Uniform Combination
Helmet	Jersey	Pants

Mississippi State Bulldogs (2–5) at Ole Miss Rebels (3–4)

Quarter	1	2	3	4	Total
Bulldogs	0	14	0	10	24
Rebels	14	7	0	10	31

at Vaught–Hemingway Stadium • Oxford, MS

- Date: Saturday, November 28, 2020
- Game time: 3:00 p.m. CST
- Game weather: Fair • Temperature: 55 °F (13 °C)
- Game attendance: 16,218
- Referee: Matt Loeffler
- TV announcers (SECN):
  Tom Hart (play-by-play)
  Jordan Rodgers (color)
  Cole Cubelic (sideline)

Game information

First Quarter

- (6:03) MISS – Dontario Drummond 48 yard pass from Matt Corral, Luke Logan kick
  Ole Miss 7–0; 5 plays, 54 yards, 1:53
- (0:16) MISS – Snoop Conner 1 yard rush, Luke Logan kick
  Ole Miss 14–0; 5 plays, 16 yards, 1:59

Second Quarter

- (13:37) MSST – Malik Heath 6 yard pass from Will Rogers, Brandon Ruiz kick
  Ole Miss 14–7; 4 plays, 75 yards, 1:39
- (9:44) MISS – Braylon Sanders 81 yard pass from Matt Corral, Luke Logan kick
  Ole Miss 21–7; 3 plays, 73 yards, 1:07
- (0:06) MSST – Malik Heath 11 yard pass from Will Rogers, Brandon Ruiz kick
  Ole Miss 21–14; 13 plays, 93 yards, 3:09

Third Quarter

- No scoring plays

Fourth Quarter

- (13:40) MISS – Luke Logan 26 yard kick
  Ole Miss 24–14; 13 plays, 58 yards, 4:46
- (7:51) MSST – Austin Williams 7 yard pass from Will Rogers, Brandon Ruiz kick
  Ole Miss 24–21; 10 plays, 75 yards, 5:49
- (4:48) MISS – Jerrion Ealy 8 yard rush, Luke Logan kick
  Ole Miss 31–21; 9 plays, 77 yards, 2:58
- (2:08) MSST – Brandon Ruiz 25 yard kick
  Ole Miss 31–24; 12 plays, 68 yards, 2:40

Statistics	MSST	MISS
First downs	23	24
Total yards	479	550
Passing yards	440	387
Rushing yards	39	163
Penalties	5–47	10–81
Turnovers	1	0
Time of possession	32:27	27:33

Team	Category	Player	Statistics
Mississippi State	Passing	Will Rogers	45/61, 440 yards, 3 TD
Mississippi State	Rushing	Will Rogers	4 carries, 26 yards
Mississippi State	Receiving	Jaden Walley	9 receptions, 176 yards
Ole Miss	Passing	Matt Corral	24/36, 385 yards, 2 TD
Ole Miss	Rushing	Jerrion Ealy	18 carries, 93 yards, 1 TD
Ole Miss	Receiving	Elijah Moore	12 receptions, 139 yards

=== At LSU ===
Uniform Combination
Helmet	Jersey	Pants

Ole Miss Rebels (4–5) at LSU Tigers (4–5)

Quarter	1	2	3	4	Total
Rebels	7	14	13	14	48
Tigers	10	24	6	13	53

at Tiger Stadium • Baton Rouge, LA

- Date: Saturday, December 19, 2020
- Game time: 2:30 p.m. CST
- Game weather: Cloudy • Temperature: 68 °F (20 °C)
- Game attendance: 21,905
- Referee: Jason Autrey
- TV announcers (SECN):
  Taylor Zarzour (play-by-play)
  Matt Stinchcomb (color)
  Cole Cubelic (sideline)

Game information

First Quarter

- (11:18) MISS – Braylon Sanders 20 pass from Matt Corral, Luke Logan kick
  Ole Miss 7–0; 6 plays, 85 yards, 2:13
- (5:35) LSU – Cade York 34 yard kick
  Ole Miss 7–3; 7 plays, 15 yards, 2:09
- (5:26) LSU – Jay Ward 31 yard interception return, Cade York kick
  LSU 10–7

Second Quarter

- (12:17) LSU – Max Johnson 1 yard rush, Cade York kick
  LSU 17–7; 9 plays, 86 yards, 3:33
- (12:03) MISS – Jerrion Ealy 100 yard kickoff return, Luke Logan kick
  LSU 17–14
- (4:50) LSU – Kayshon Boutte 32 pass from Max Johnson, Cade York kick
  LSU 24–14; 4 plays, 40 yards, 1:22
- (3:07) MISS – Henry Parrish Jr. 1 yard rush, Luke Logan kick
  LSU 24–21; 6 plays, 61 yards, 1:33
- (0:58) LSU – Kayshon Boutte 18 pass from Max Johnson, Cade York kick
  LSU 31–21; 9 plays, 755 yards, 2:09
- (0:02) LSU – Cade York 34 yard kick
  LSU 34–21; 4 plays, 3 yards, 0:21

Third Quarter

- (9:50) LSU – Cade York 23 yard kick
  LSU 37–21; 11 plays, 39 yards, 4:19
- (8:11) MISS – Henry Parrish Jr. 10 yard rush, two-point conversion failed
  LSU 37–27; 5 plays, 65 yards, 1:39
- (4:03) MISS – Dontario Drummond 5 yard pass from Matt Corral, Luke Logan kick
  LSU 37–34; 8 plays, 77 yards, 2:44
- (2:16) LSU – Cade York 50 yard kick
  LSU 40–34; 6 plays, 48 yards, 1:45

Fourth Quarter

- (14:53) MISS – Braylon Sanders 25 yard pass from Matt Corral, Luke Logan kick
  Ole Miss 41–40; 6 plays, 67 yards, 2:15
- (8:43) MISS – Matt Corral 2 yard rush, Luke Logan kick
  Ole Miss 48–40; 11 plays, 80 yards, 3:52
- (5:31) LSU – Max Johnson 1 yard rush, two-point conversion failed
  Ole Miss 48–46; 10 plays, 75 yards, 3:03
- (1:34) LSU – Kayshon Boutte 45 yard pass from Max Johnson, Cade York kick
  LSU 53–48; 3 plays, 56 yards, 1:02

Statistics	MISS	LSU
First downs	25	29
Total yards	558	593
Passing yards	251	435
Rushing yards	307	158
Penalties	6-51	4-39
Turnovers	6	1
Time of possession	26:45	33:15

Team	Category	Player	Statistics
Ole Miss	Passing	Matt Corral	15/27, 251 yards, 3 TD, 5 INT
Ole Miss	Rushing	Matt Corral	17 carries, 158 yards, 1 TD
Ole Miss	Receiving	Braylon Sanders	4 receptions, 70 yards, 2 TD
LSU	Passing	Max Johnson	27/51, 435 yards, 3 TD, 1 INT
LSU	Rushing	Josh Williams	12 carries, 55 yards
LSU	Receiving	Kayshon Boutte	14 receptions, 308 yards, 3 TD

=== Vs. Indiana (Outback Bowl) ===
Uniform Combination
Helmet	Jersey	Pants

Ole Miss Rebels (4–5) vs. No. 11 Indiana Hoosiers (6–1)

Quarter	1	2	3	4	Total
Rebels	6	7	7	6	26
No. 11 Hoosiers	3	0	3	14	20

at Raymond James Stadium • Tampa, FL

- Date: Saturday, January 2, 2021
- Game time: 11:30 a.m. CST (12:30 p.m. local EST)
- Game weather: Cloudy • Temperature: 78 °F (26 °C)
- Game attendance: 11,025
- Referee: Gary Patterson
- TV announcers (ABC):
  Tom Hart (play-by-play)
  Jordan Rodgers (color)
  Cole Cubelic (sideline)

Game information

First Quarter

- (12:56) MISS – Luke Logan 26 yard kick
  Ole Miss 3–0; 7 plays, 57 yards, 2:04
- (2:47) IND – Charles Campbell 50 yard kick
  Tied 3–3; 11 plays, 49 yards, 6:07
- (0:23) MISS – Luke Logan 24 yard kick
  Ole Miss 6–3; 13 plays, 68 yards, 2:24

Second Quarter

- (7:17) MISS – Casey Kelly 5 yard pass from Matt Corral, Luke Logan kick
  Ole Miss 13–3; 18 plays, 76 yards, 6:00

Third Quarter

- (12:53) IND – Charles Campbell 53 yard kick
  Ole Miss 13–6; 8 plays, 40 yards, 2:07
- (9:20) MISS – Snoop Conner 4 yard rush, Luke Logan kick
  Ole Miss 20–6; 12 plays, 87 yards, 3:33

Fourth Quarter

- (14:56) IND – Stevie Scott III 3 yard rush, Charles Campbell kick
  Ole Miss 20–13; 15 plays, 80 yards, 6:45
- (5:58) IND – Stevie Scott III 2 yard rush, Charles Campbell kick
  Tied 20–20; 12 plays, 80 yards, 5:40
- (4:12) MISS – Dontario Drummond 3 yard pass from Matt Corral, PAT missed
  Ole Miss 26–20; 6 plays, 63 yards, 1:46

Statistics	MISS	IND
First downs	27	26
Total yards	493	369
Passing yards	346	201
Rushing yards	147	168
Penalties	8-79	5-50
Turnovers	0	2
Time of possession	24:19	35:41

Team	Category	Player	Statistics
Ole Miss	Passing	Matt Corral	30/44, 342 yards, 2 TD
Ole Miss	Rushing	Henry Parrish Jr.	17 carries, 63 yards
Ole Miss	Receiving	Dontario Drummond	6 receptions, 110 yards, 1 TD
Indiana	Passing	Jack Tuttle	26/45, 201 yards, 1 INT
Indiana	Rushing	Stevie Scott III	19 carries, 99 yards, 2 TD
Indiana	Receiving	Whop Philyor	18 receptions, 81 yards

== Cumulative Season Statistics ==
=== Cumulative Team Statistics ===
Category	Ole Miss	Opponents
First downs - Avg. per game	276 - 27.6	274 - 27.4
Points - Avg. per game	392 - 39.2	383 - 38.3
Total plays/yards - Avg. per game	797/5555 (6.97 yards/play) - 79.7/555.5	778/5190 (6.67 yards/play) - 77.8/519
Passing yards - Avg. per game	3449 - 344.9	3121 - 312.1
Rushes/yards (net) - Avg. per game	462/2106 - 46.2/210.6 (4.56 yards/carry)	391/2069 - 39.1/206.9 (5.29 yards/carry)
Passing (Att-Comp-Int)	335-238-14 (71.04% completion)	387-263-6 (67.96% completion)
Sacks - Avg. per game	16 - 1.6	19 - 1.9
Penalties–yards - Avg. per game	60–516 - 6–51.6	50–486 - 5–48.6
3rd down conversions	70–141 (49.65%)	63–135 (46.67%)
4th down conversions	22–33 (66.67%)	13–18 (72.22%)
Time of possession - Avg. per game	4:38:34 - 27:51	5:21:26 - 32:09

=== Cumulative Player Statistics ===
Category	Player	Statistics - Avg. per game
Leading Passer	Matt Corral	231/326 (70.86% completion), 3337 yards, 29 TD, 14 INT - 23.1/32.6, 333.7 yards, 2.9 TD, 1.4 INT
Leading Rusher	Jerrion Ealy	147 carries, 745 yards, 9 TD - 14.7 carries, 74.5 yards (5.07 yards/carry), 0.9 TD
Leading Receiver	Elijah Moore	86 receptions, 1193 yards, 8 TD - 8.6 receptions, 119.3 yards, 0.8 TD

== Coaching staff ==
Coach	Title	Year at Ole Miss	Previous job
Lane Kiffin	Head Coach	1st	Florida Atlantic
Jeff Lebby	OC/QB	1st	UCF (OC/QB)
D. J. Durkin	Co-DC/LB	1st	Atlanta Falcons (consultant)
Chris Partridge	Co-DC/S	1st	Michigan (S/STC)
Deke Adams	DL	1st	Mississippi State (DL)
Terrell Buckley	CB	1st	Mississippi State (CB)
Randy Clements	OL/RGC	1st	Florida State (OL)
Joe Jon Finley	TE/PGC	1st	Texas A&M (TE)
Blake Gideon	STC	1st	Houston (STC/S)
Derrick Nix	WR	13th	Atlanta Falcons (OA)
Kevin Smith	RB	1st	Florida Atlantic (RB)

== Players drafted into the NFL ==
Round	Pick	Player	Position	NFL Club
2	34	Elijah Moore	WR	New York Jets
4	142	Royce Newman	OG	Green Bay Packers
