= Burlsworth Trophy =

American college football award

- Awarded for: The most outstanding FBS college football player who began his career as a walk-on.
- Location: Crystal Bridges Museum of American Art, Bentonville, Arkansas
- Country: United States
- Presented by: The Brandon Burlsworth Foundation

History
- First award: 2010
- Most recent: North Texas quarterback Drew Mestemaker
- Website: http://burlsworthtrophy.com/

The Burlsworth Trophy is an award given annually to the most outstanding FBS college football player who began his career as a walk-on. It was first awarded for the 2010 season and is a program of the Brandon Burlsworth Foundation. Burlsworth walked on to the Arkansas Razorbacks football program in 1994 and became an All-American. He was killed in a car accident 11 days after being selected by the Indianapolis Colts in the third round of the 1999 NFL draft.

On October 28, 2019, the Burlsworth Trophy became a member of the National College Football Awards Association (NCFAA). It joins the Broyles Award as the only members of the NCFAA originating in Arkansas. The trophy was sculpted and produced by Raymond Gibby of Nobility Bronze in Pea Ridge, Arkansas.

== Winners and finalists ==
Year	Winner	Pos.	School	Other finalists	Ref.
2010	Sean Bedford	C	Georgia Tech	Army LB Josh McNary; Tennessee LB Nick Reveiz; Oklahoma State FB Bryant Ward; Boise State DE Ryan Winterswyk	
2011	Austin Davis	QB	Southern Miss	Houston WR Patrick Edwards; Stanford WR Griff Whalen	
2012	Matt McGloin	QB	Penn State	Michigan S Jordan Kovacs; San José State OT David Quessenberry	
2013	Jared Abbrederis	WR	Wisconsin	Missouri G Max Copeland; Tulsa RB Trey Watts	
2014	Justin Hardy	WR	East Carolina	Mississippi State G Ben Beckwith; Iowa FB Mark Weisman	
2015	Baker Mayfield	QB	Oklahoma	Washington State QB Luke Falk; Penn State DE Carl Nassib	
2016	Baker Mayfield (2)	QB	Oklahoma	Northwestern WR Austin Carr; Washington State QB Luke Falk	
2017	Luke Falk	QB	Washington State	Wisconsin TE Troy Fumagalli; Oklahoma QB Baker Mayfield; Memphis WR Anthony Miller	
2018	Hunter Renfrow	WR	Clemson	California RB Patrick Laird; Wyoming S Marcus Epps	
2019	Kenny Willekes	DE	Michigan State	Georgia K Rodrigo Blankenship; California S/RS Ashtyn Davis	
2020	Jimmy Morrissey	C	Pittsburgh	BYU WR Dax Milne; Arkansas LB Grant Morgan	
2021	Grant Morgan	LB	Arkansas	Georgia QB Stetson Bennett; Troy LB Carlton Martial	
2022	Stetson Bennett	QB	Georgia	Purdue QB Aidan O'Connell; Troy LB Carlton Martial	
2023	Cody Schrader	RB	Missouri	James Madison DT James Carpenter; Oklahoma WR Drake Stoops	
2024	Bryce Boettcher	LB	Oregon	Buffalo LB Shaun Dolac; Indiana DT James Carpenter	
2025	Drew Mestemaker	QB	North Texas	Oklahoma G Febechi Nwaiwu; Texas S Michael Taaffe	
