= Scott Fountain =

American football player and coach (born 1966)

Biographical details
- Born: February 28, 1966 (age 60); East Brewton, Alabama, U.S.
- Education: Samford; Florida State

Playing career
- 1984–1987: Samford
- Position: Offensive lineman

Coaching career (HC unless noted)
- 1988: Flomaton HS (AL) (assistant)
- 1989: W.S. Neal HS (AL) (assistant)
- 1990–1992: Frisco City HS (AL)
- 1993: Monroe County HS (AL)
- 1994–1996: Florida State (GA)
- 1997–2003: UCF (RC/OL)
- 2004–2005: Middle Tennessee (OL)
- 2006: Georgia Southern (OL)
- 2007–2008: Iowa State (TE/RC)
- 2009–2012: Auburn (PPD)
- 2013–2016: Auburn (TE/STC)
- 2017: Georgia (STCA)
- 2018: Mississippi State (STC)
- 2019: Georgia (STC)
- 2020–2025: Arkansas (AHC/STC)

Accomplishments and honors

Championships
- 1× BCS National Champion (2010)

Scott Fountain (born February 28, 1966) is an American college football coach who was the special teams coordinator at the University of Arkansas. Prior to being hired at Arkansas, he was the special teams coordinator at the University of Georgia.

== Early life ==
Fountain was born in East Brewton, Alabama on February 28, 1966, where he grew up and graduated from W.S. Neal High School in 1984. He later went on to play football as an offensive lineman for Samford University from 1984 to 1987.

== Coaching career ==
=== High school coaching ===
Scott began his career in coaching after graduating from Samford at the high school level. He made four stops throughout Alabama high school football, including Flomaton HS 1988 and W.S. Neal HS 1989, his alma mater. He became a head coach for the first time at Frisco City HS 1990-1992 and made his final stop at the high school level in 1993 at Monroe County.

=== Florida State ===
In the beginning of Fountain's collegiate coaching career, he was asked by Bobby Bowden to join the Seminoles as an offensive graduate assistant in 1994 where he remained until the end of the 1996 season

=== UCF ===
Fountain continued his coaching career on the collegiate level when he joined the UCF Golden Knights staff in 1997 as the team's offensive line coach and recruiting coordinator a position he held until the end of the 2003 season.

=== Middle Tennessee ===
For the 2004 and 2005 seasons, Fountain coached at Middle Tennessee State University as the team's offensive line coach

=== Georgia Southern ===
In the 2006 season Scott coached at Georgia Southern as the team's offensive line coach and assistant head coach.

=== Iowa State ===
In 2007 Fountain began coaching at Iowa State as the Cyclones‘ tight ends coach and recruiting coordinator under Gene Chizik. He remained there until after the 2008 season.

=== Auburn ===
In 2009 Scott returned to Alabama, following Chizik over from Iowa State, Fountain was taken off the field and given the title of Director of Player Personnel which allowed him to have a major hand in the team's administrative and recruiting efforts until the completion of the 2012 season. During his time in this position, Fountain helped the "Tigers sign three consecutive Top 10 recruiting classes [in the nation]". Helping the Tigers win the 2011 BCS National Championship over the University of Oregon. After the head coaching change from Gene Chizik to Gus Malzahn, Fountain stepped back out to the field as Special Teams Coordinator/Tight Ends Coach from the 2013 season to the 2016 season. During the first season of Fountain's return to the field, Gus Malzahn led the Tigers to the 2014 BCS National Championship Game game where they came up short to beating Jimbo Fisher's Florida State Seminoles. The Tigers did not come up completely empty handed as many impressive feats occurred during the season for the Tigers. In the 2013 season, the Tigers had "the second biggest turn around in college football" with an overall record of 3–9 in 2012 (0-8 SEC) to an overall record of 12–2 in 2013 (8-1 SEC). Fountain was a major part of that success as special teams for the Tigers was able to return two kick off returns and return one punt return for touchdowns. Another major success of the 2013 special teams was the dubbed, Kick Six. In the 78th Iron Bowl, Chris Davis caught a missed 57-yard field goal by the University of Alabama, and returned the ball for a 109-yard field goal return for a touchdown to clinch the SEC Western Division.

=== Georgia (first stint) ===
In 2017 Scott worked as a special teams analyst for Kirby Smart and the Georgia Bulldogs.

=== Mississippi State ===
In 2018 Fountain worked as the special teams coordinator for Mississippi State.

=== Georgia (second stint) ===
In 2019 returned to Georgia as the team's special teams coordinator.

=== Arkansas ===
For the 2020 season Scott joined Arkansas as the team's assistant head coach and special teams coordinator under Sam Pittman.
