= Grant Morgan (American football) =

American football player and coach (born 1998)

Jacksonville Jaguars
- Title: Defensive assistant

Personal information
- Born: January 23, 1998 (age 28); St. Louis, Missouri, U.S.
- Listed height: 5 ft 11 in (1.80 m)
- Listed weight: 224 lb (102 kg)

Career information
- Position: Linebacker
- High school: Greenwood (Greenwood, Arkansas)
- College: Arkansas (2016–2021)
- NFL draft: 2022: undrafted

Career history

Playing
- Jacksonville Jaguars (2022)*
- * Offseason or practice squad member only

Coaching
- Illinois (2023) Graduate assistant; Illinois (2024) Assistant linebackers; New York Giants (2025) Defensive assistant; Jacksonville Jaguars (2026-present) Defensive assistant

Awards and highlights
- Burlsworth Trophy (2021); Second-team All-American (2020); First-team All-SEC (2020)
- Stats at Pro Football Reference

Grant Morgan (born January 23, 1998) is an American football coach for the Jacksonville Jaguars. He played college football for the Arkansas Razorbacks. Originally a preferred walk-on with the team, he was placed on full scholarship in August 2018. He has since been named to multiple All-America and All-SEC teams, and has served as a team captain for the Razorbacks in 2020 and 2021. He has twice been named a Burlsworth Trophy finalist, and signed a Name, Image and Likeness (NIL) deal with Walk-On's Bistreaux and Bar in August 2021. He has previously served as a coach for the Illinois Fighting Illini.

== Early life ==
Grant Morgan, the son of Matt Morgan and Annie Shaw, was born in St. Louis, Missouri, on January 23, 1998. He was a three-year letterwinner at Greenwood High School, where he was rated the No. 22 prospect in Arkansas and the No. 71 inside linebacker in his class by 247Sports and given an overall three-star rating. During his senior year, he was named Defensive Player of the Year by the Arkansas Democrat-Gazette and Player of the Year by the Southwest Times Record. Greenwood made the second round of the AAA football playoffs in Morgan's junior year and went to the state championship in his senior year.

Morgan accepted a position as a preferred walk-on at Arkansas on January 18, 2016, one day after his unofficial visit to the campus. He chose Arkansas over his other interests, Arkansas State, Auburn, Central Arkansas, Michigan, Missouri, Nebraska, and Tulsa, though he did not receive offers from any of these schools. Morgan formally enrolled at Arkansas on May 31, 2016.

== College career ==
After redshirting during the 2016 season, Morgan saw the field for the first time in 2017. He appeared in all twelve of the Razorbacks' games, recording at least one tackle in each, and a season-high eight in the last game of the season against Missouri. On August 26, 2018, Morgan was placed on full scholarship alongside two other Arkansas players. In 2018 and 2019, Morgan again made appearances in every game for Arkansas, totaling 24 and 39 tackles, respectively, over the course of each season. Prior to the 2020 season, Morgan was voted one of four team captains by his teammates under new head coach Sam Pittman, and garnered nationwide recognition by the end of the season. He was named a second-team All-American by the Walter Camp Football Foundation and the American Football Coaches Association, and earned third-team All-America honors from college football analyst Phil Steele. Morgan was also named first-team all-SEC by the Associated Press and SEC head coaches, the first Razorback to be named by both since Martrell Spaight in 2014. On August 12, 2021, Arkansas announced that Morgan had signed a Name, Image and Likeness (NIL) deal with Walk-On's Bistreaux and Bar. As a senior, Morgan helped Arkansas to an 8–4 regular season, and a bid to the 2022 Outback Bowl against Penn State on New Year's Day. The Razorbacks went on to win the game, 24–10, finishing the 2021 season 9–4 and ranked in the Top 25.

In 2020, Morgan was named a finalist for the Burlsworth Trophy – which is given to the best national player who began their college career as a walk-on – alongside Dax Milne and eventual winner Jimmy Morrissey. Morgan was again named a finalist in 2021, alongside Carlton Martial and Stetson Bennett. The trophy ceremony was held at the Crystal Bridges Museum of American Art on December 6, and Morgan was announced as the winner.

== Professional career ==
Pre-draft measurables
| Height | Weight | Arm length | Hand span | Wingspan | 40-yard dash | 10-yard split | 20-yard split | 20-yard shuttle | Three-cone drill | Vertical jump | Broad jump | Bench press |
|---|---|---|---|---|---|---|---|---|---|---|---|---|
| 5 ft 11 1/8 in (1.81 m) | 224 lb (102 kg) | 30 1/2 in (0.77 m) | 9 5/8 in (0.24 m) | 6 ft 2 5/8 in (1.90 m) | 4.90 s | 1.68 s | 2.79 s | 4.22 s | 7.14 s | 34.5 in (0.88 m) | 9 ft 4 in (2.84 m) | 21 reps |
All values from Pro Day

Morgan signed with the Jacksonville Jaguars as an undrafted free agent on May 2, 2022. He was waived on August 26 and re-signed to the practice squad. He was released off the practice squad on September 12.

== Coaching career ==
In April 2023, Morgan joined the Illinois coaching staff as a graduate assistant. The following season, he was the team's assistant linebackers coach.

On January 30, 2025, the New York Giants announced that they had hired Morgan to be a defensive assistant.

On March 7th, 2026, it was reported that Morgan was rejoining the Jacksonville Jaguars as a defensive assistant.

== Personal life ==
Morgan is the second of seven siblings. He has an older brother – former Arkansas wide receiver Drew Morgan – in addition to four younger sisters and a younger brother. Morgan graduated from the University of Arkansas in 2019 with a Bachelor of Science in kinesiology, and again in 2020 with a Master of Science in operations management. On January 4, 2020, Morgan married his longtime girlfriend, Sydnie, an Arkansas Tech softball player.
