= Jerry Jacobs (American football) =

American football player (born 1997)

No. 39, 23
- Position: Cornerback

Personal information
- Born: September 26, 1997 (age 29); Atlanta, Georgia, U.S.
- Listed height: 5 ft 11 in (1.80 m)
- Listed weight: 203 lb (92 kg)

Career information
- High school: South Cobb (Austell, Georgia)
- College: Hutchinson CC (2016–2018); Arkansas State (2018–2019); Arkansas (2020)
- NFL draft: 2021: undrafted

Career history
- Detroit Lions (2021–2023); Los Angeles Rams (2024)*; Saskatchewan Roughriders (2026)*
- * Offseason or practice squad member only

Awards and highlights
- Second-team All-Sun Belt (2018)

Career NFL statistics
- Total tackles: 131
- Sacks: 1.0
- Forced fumbles: 1
- Fumble recoveries: 1
- Pass deflections: 23
- Interceptions: 4
- Stats at Pro Football Reference

Jerry Jacobs (born September 26, 1997) is an American former professional football player who was a cornerback in the National Football League (NFL). He played college football at Hutchinson Community College, Arkansas State and Arkansas. Jacobs was signed as an undrafted free agent by the Detroit Lions in 2021.

== College career ==
Jacobs began his collegiate career at Hutchinson Community College. He Earned KJCC All-Conference honors with the Blue Dragons and recorded 39 tackles and four interceptions. In the fall of 2018 he transferred to Arkansas State. During the 2018 season he recorded 31 tackles, four interceptions and eight pass breakups in 13 games. Following the season he was named second-team All-Sun Belt Conference. During the 2019 season, he made four starts with 21 tackles, and two pass breakups, before suffering a season-ending ACL tear.

Following the season he transferred to Arkansas. On October 26, 2020, Jacobs opted out of the remaining six games of the season and declared for the 2021 NFL draft. In four games with the Razorbacks, he recorded 17 tackles, including one for a loss. His 249 defensive snaps were the fourth-most on the team.

== Professional career ==
Pre-draft measurables
Height	Weight	Arm length	Hand span	Wingspan	40-yard dash	10-yard split	20-yard split	20-yard shuttle	Three-cone drill	Vertical jump	Broad jump	Bench press
5 ft 10 1/4 in (1.78 m)	208 lb (94 kg)	30 5/8 in (0.78 m)	9 3/8 in (0.24 m)	6 ft 3 1/4 in (1.91 m)	4.53 s	1.64 s	2.63 s	4.33 s	6.95 s	34.5 in (0.88 m)	10 ft 0 in (3.05 m)	20 reps
All values from Pro Day

=== Detroit Lions ===
On May 1, 2021, Jacobs signed with the Detroit Lions as an undrafted free agent. He was named to the Lions' 53-man roster and made his first career start in Week 5. He started the next nine games before suffering a torn ACL in Week 14. He was placed on injured reserve on December 13, 2021.

Jacobs was placed on the reserve/PUP list to start the 2022 season. He was activated on October 22.

Jacobs entered the 2023 season as a starting cornerback for the Lions. In Week 4, he recorded two interceptions on Packers quarterback Jordan Love in a 34–20 win. He finished the season with 55 tackles, eight passes defensed, and three interceptions through 15 games and 12 starts.

=== Los Angeles Rams ===
On July 27, 2024, Jacobs signed with the Los Angeles Rams. He was released by Los Angeles on August 20.

=== Saskatchewan Roughriders ===
On February 26, 2026, Jacobs signed with the Saskatchewan Roughriders of the Canadian Football League (CFL). On May 12, Jacobs announced his retirement from professional football on social media.
