= Rion Rhoades =

American football coach (born 1975)

Biographical details
- Born: January 7, 1975 (age 51); Liberal, Kansas, U.S.
- Education: Northwestern Oklahoma State University (1998)

Playing career
- 1993–1994: Hutchinson
- 1995: Western Illinois
- 1996–1997: NW Oklahoma State
- Position: Linebacker

Coaching career (HC unless noted)
- 1998: Fort Hays State (GA/ILB)
- 1999: Leoti HS (KS)
- 2000–2001: NW Oklahoma State (OL)
- 2002: NW Oklahoma State (AHC/DC)
- 2003: NW Oklahoma State (AHC/co-DC)
- 2004–2005: Coffeyville (DC)
- 2006: Fort Scott
- 2007–2019: Hutchinson
- 2020: Arkansas (LB)
- 2021 (spring): Arkansas (spec. assistant to the HC)

Head coaching record
- Overall: 106–55 (junior college)
- Bowls: 8–2
- Tournaments: 6–7 (KJCCC playoffs)

Accomplishments and honors

Championships
- 1 KJCCC (2014)

Awards
- 2× KJCCC Coach of the Year (2006, 2014)

Rion Rhoades (born January 7, 1975) is an American former college football coach. He was the head football coach for Leoti High School in 1999, Fort Scott Community College in 2006, and Hutchinson Community College from 2007 to 2019. He also coached for Fort Hays State, Northwestern Oklahoma State, Coffeyville, Arkansas. He played college football for Hutchinson, Western Illinois, and Northwestern Oklahoma State as a linebacker.

== Head coaching record ==
=== Junior college ===
Year	Team	Overall	Conference	Standing	Bowl/playoffs	NJCAA^{#}
Fort Scott Greyhounds (Kansas Jayhawk Community College Conference) (2006)
2006	Fort Scott	7–5	5–2	3rd	L KJCCC championship, L C.H.A.M.P.S. Heart of Texas Bowl	12
Fort Scott:		7–5	5–2			
Hutchinson Blue Dragons (Kansas Jayhawk Community College Conference) (2007–2019)
2007	Hutchinson	2–7	2–5	T–5th		
2008	Hutchinson	7–4	4–3	T–3rd	L KJCCC championship	19
2009	Hutchinson	7–4	4–3	4th	L KJCCC semifinal, W Salt City Bowl	13
2010	Hutchinson	10–2	6–1	2nd	L KJCCC championship, W Salt City Bowl	5
2011	Hutchinson	9–3	5–1	2nd	L KJCCC championship, W Salt City Bowl	8
2012	Hutchinson	9–3	6–1	2nd	L KJCCC championship, W Salt City Bowl	12
2013	Hutchinson	8–4	5–2	T–2nd	L KJCCC championship, W Salt City Bowl	17
2014	Hutchinson	11–1	7–0	1st	W Salt City Bowl	4
2015	Hutchinson	5–6	3–4	5th		
2016	Hutchinson	5–6	2–5	T–6th		
2017	Hutchinson	7–5	4–3	4th	L Salt City Bowl	
2018	Hutchinson	9–3	6–1	2nd	W Salt City Bowl	8
2019	Hutchinson	10–2	5–2	T–2nd	W Salt City Bowl	3
Hutchinson:		99–50	59–31			
Total:		106–55				
National championship Conference title Conference division title or championship game berth
