= Jimmy Morrissey =

American football player (born 1998)

No. 65 – New York Jets
- Position: Center
- Roster status: Practice squad

Personal information
- Born: June 9, 1998 (age 28); Huntingdon Valley, Pennsylvania, U.S.
- Listed height: 6 ft 4 in (1.93 m)
- Listed weight: 305 lb (138 kg)

Career information
- High school: La Salle College (Wyndmoor, Pennsylvania)
- College: Pittsburgh (2016–2020)
- NFL draft: 2021: 7th round, 230th overall pick

Career history
- Las Vegas Raiders (2021)*; Houston Texans (2021–2023); New York Giants (2024)*; Indianapolis Colts (2025); New York Jets (2026–present)*
- * Offseason or practice squad member only

Awards and highlights
- Burlsworth Trophy (2020); First-team All-ACC (2019); Second-team All-ACC (2020); Third-team All-ACC (2018)

Career NFL statistics as of 2025
- Games played: 15
- Games started: 4
- Stats at Pro Football Reference

James David Morrissey IV (born June 9, 1998) is an American professional football center for the New York Jets of the National Football League (NFL). He played college football for the Pittsburgh Panthers.

== Early life ==
Morrissey grew up in Huntingdon Valley, Pennsylvania and attended La Salle College High School. He was named All-Philadelphia Catholic League as a junior and as a senior, when he was also named All-City by the Philadelphia Daily News. Morrissey was lightly recruited coming out of high school and received no NCAA Division I Football Bowl Subdivision offers. He chose to enroll at the University of Pittsburgh as a preferred walk-on over offers from Lehigh, Bucknell and Colgate.

== Personal life ==
Morrisey is married to Nicole Scola as of March 2024. She is the daughter of Michael Scola, founder of Boston Sword & Tuna. The two expect their first child in 2025.

== College career ==
Morrissey walked-on to Pittsburgh's football team and redshirted his true freshman season. He was named the Panthers' starting center and awarded a scholarship going into his redshirt freshman season and started all 12 of the team's games. Morrissey started the first 11 games of his redshirt sophomore season before suffering a season-ending injury and was named third-team All-Atlantic Coast Conference (ACC). He was named first-team All-ACC as a redshirt junior. As a redshirt senior, Morrissey started all 11 of Pittsburgh's games, including one at right guard after an injuries to that position, and was named second-team All-ACC and was awarded the Burlsworth Trophy as the best player in Division I football who began his college career as a walk-on.

== Professional career ==
Pre-draft measurables
Height	Weight	Arm length	Hand span	Wingspan	40-yard dash	10-yard split	20-yard split	20-yard shuttle	Three-cone drill	Vertical jump	Broad jump	Bench press
6 ft 3 1/4 in (1.91 m)	303 lb (137 kg)	32 3/4 in (0.83 m)	10 in (0.25 m)	6 ft 6 5/8 in (2.00 m)	5.29 s	1.68 s	3.00 s	4.47 s	7.39 s	31.0 in (0.79 m)	8 ft 9 in (2.67 m)	26 reps
All values from Pro Day

=== Las Vegas Raiders ===
Morrissey was selected by the Las Vegas Raiders in the seventh round, 230th overall, of the 2021 NFL draft. He signed his four-year rookie contract with Las Vegas on May 17. He was waived on August 31, 2021 and re-signed to the practice squad the next day.

=== Houston Texans ===
Morrissey was signed off the Raiders' practice squad by the Houston Texans on October 19, 2021. He made his NFL debut on November 7, as the team's starting center in a 9–17 loss to the Miami Dolphins.

On August 30, 2022, Morrissey was waived by the Texans and signed to the practice squad the next day. He was promoted to the active roster on September 21.

On August 29, 2023, Morrissey was waived by the Texans and re-signed to the practice squad. He was not signed to a reserve/future contract after the season and thus became a free agent when his practice squad contract expired.

=== New York Giants ===
On January 23, 2024, Morrissey signed a reserve/future contract with the New York Giants. He was waived on August 27, and re-signed to the practice squad.

Morrissey signed a reserve/future contract with New York on January 6, 2025. On August 23, Morrissey was waived by the Giants.

=== Indianapolis Colts ===
On September 16, 2025, Morrissey signed with the Indianapolis Colts' practice squad. On December 3, he was released by Indianapolis. Morrissey was re-signed to the practice squad on December 10. He signed a reserve/future contract with Indianapolis on January 5, 2026.

On August 30, 2026, Morrissey was waived by the Colts as a part of final roster cuts.

=== New York Jets ===
On September 29, 2026, Morrissey signed with the New York Jets practice squad.
