= Greg Brooks Jr. =

American disability advocate and former college football player (born 2001)

- Born: August 30, 2001 (age 25); Harvey, Louisiana, U.S.
- Education: University of Arkansas (2019–2021); Louisiana State University (2022–2023)
- Occupations: Former college football player; disability advocate
- Football career

No. 3
- Position: Safety

Career information
- College: Arkansas (2019–2021); LSU (2022–2023)

Greg Brooks Jr. (born August 30, 2001) is an American former college football player and disability advocate who was a member, and later captain, of LSU football from 2022 to 2023.

In 2023, Brooks was diagnosed with medulloblastoma, a form of brain cancer. Due to complications from the surgery, he suffered from paralysis and speech impairment. Subsequent lawsuits from Brooks and his family against LSU alleged abandonment from the coaching staff after the brain tumor surgery.

== Football career ==
Originally from Harvey, Louisiana, he played for West Jefferson High School. Brooks joined the Arkansas Razorbacks in 2019, starting all 12 games for them that season. He joined LSU in 2022, and helped the Tigers to a Citrus Bowl victory that year, and continued with the team for three years.

He was regarded by some as a potential future NFL draft pick.

== Brain tumor diagnosis and disability advocacy ==
In 2023, during his fifth-year senior season, Brooks was diagnosed with medulloblastoma, which was relatively rare for someone of Brooks's age. After the surgery to remove the tumor, the cancer showed no sign of spreading, although he faced significant rehabilitation, including having to re-learn how to eat, write, and speak.

The Atlanta Falcons, led by head coach Raheem Morris and former Arkansas teammate Feleipe Franks, gave Brooks a chance at experiencing life in the NFL.

=== Legal action ===
Brooks filed a lawsuit against LSU and their trainers, alleging neglect from and a lack of qualification of the trainers who initially diagnosed him with vertigo after he had vomited during practice. It also alleges that Brooks suffered multiple seizures during the surgery to remove his tumor, alleged to be the result of malpractice by his surgeon.

It also alleged that head coach Brian Kelly and the coaching staff failed to continue contact with Brooks after his surgery, which Kelly denied. As of 2025, the Brooks family continued their lawsuit against LSU and Our Lady of the Lake Regional Medical Center.

== Personal life ==
Brooks's father, Greg Brooks Sr., was a college football player for the Michigan Wolverines and Southern Miss Golden Eagles. He was later selected in the sixth round of the 2004 NFL draft by the Cincinnati Bengals.

He has also credited his then-girlfriend Kurstin with her assistance in his recovery. They announced their engagement in July 2025.
