= Hunter Yurachek =

American college sports administrator (born 1968)

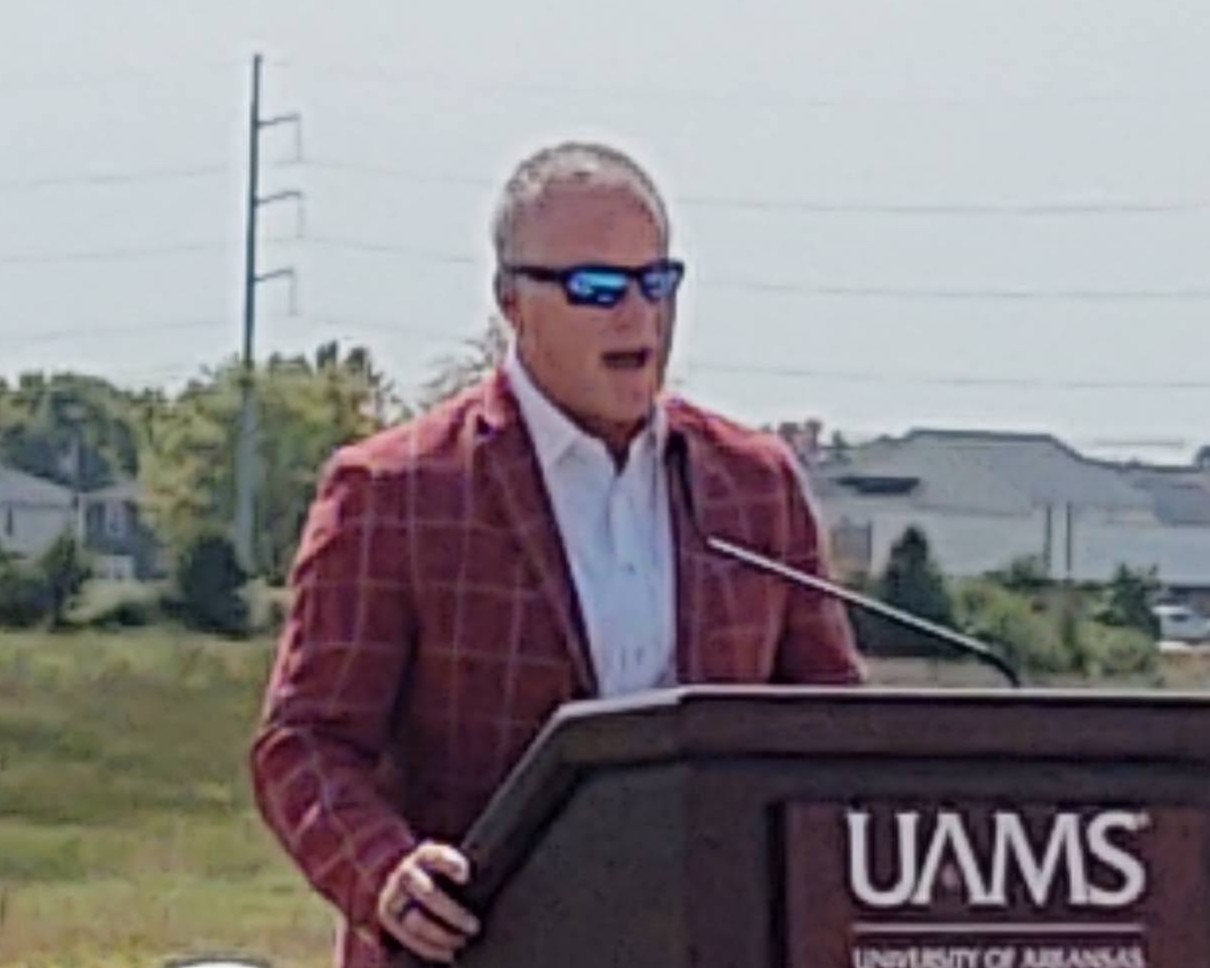
- Yurachek in 2023

Current position
- Title: Athletic director
- Team: Arkansas
- Conference: SEC

Biographical details
- Born: October 21, 1968 (age 58); Richmond, Virginia, U.S.
- Education: Guilford College

Administrative career (AD unless noted)
- 1994–1998: Wake Forest (assistant director of marketing and promotions)
- 1998–2000: Vanderbilt (assistant athletics director)
- 2001–2004: Western Carolina (senior associate athletics director)
- 2004–2006: Virginia (associate athletics director)
- 2006–2010: Akron (executive senior associate athletics director)
- 2010–2015: Coastal Carolina
- 2015–2017: Houston
- 2017–present: Arkansas

Hunter Reid Yurachek (born October 21, 1968) is an American university sports administrator who is the athletic director at the University of Arkansas, and previously for the University of Houston.

== Early life and education ==
Yurachek was born on October 21, 1968, in Richmond, Virginia, and was raised in Charlotte, North Carolina. He lettered four years in basketball and received his bachelor's degree at Guilford College in 1990, and then his master's degree from the University of Richmond in 1994.

He grew up listening to radio broadcasts and was heavily influenced by the evolution of ESPN and SportsCenter.

== Athletic director ==
=== Coastal Carolina ===
After stints at Wake Forest, Vanderbilt, Western Carolina, Virginia, and Akron, Yurachek was named athletic director for Coastal Carolina University. He was named the 2014 FCS Athletic Director of the Year while at Coastal Carolina.

=== Arkansas ===
After a stint at Houston as vice president for athletics, Yurachek once again became an athletic director, this time at the University of Arkansas. Yurachek has helped improve Arkansas both in and out of sports, overseeing Arkansas programs win several SEC and national titles, along with setting a spring term GPA record with an average 3.43 GPA.
