= Jalen Catalon =

American football player (born 2001)

No. 1 – Missouri Tigers
- Position: Defensive back
- Class: Senior

Personal information
- Born: March 15, 2001 (age 25)
- Listed height: 5 ft 11 in (1.80 m)
- Listed weight: 205 lb (93 kg)

Career information
- High school: Mansfield Legacy (Mansfield, Texas)
- College: Arkansas (2019–2022); Texas (2023); UNLV (2024); Missouri (2025–present)

Awards and highlights
- First-team All-MW (2024); First-team All-SEC (2020)
- Stats at ESPN

Jalen Catalon (born March 15, 2001) is an American college football safety and defensive back for the Missouri Tigers. He previously played for the Arkansas Razorbacks, Texas Longhorns and UNLV Rebels.

== Early life ==
Catalon grew up in Mansfield, Texas and attended Mansfield Legacy High School, where he played baseball, basketball, and football. As a sophomore, he recorded 183 total tackles with seven tackles for loss and nine interceptions. Catalon was named the All-Area Defensive Player of the Year by The Dallas Morning News as a junior after recording 101 tackles, three interceptions, six forced fumbles and five fumble recoveries. He also started at quarterback and passed for 1,122 yards and 15 touchdowns with 1,064 yards and 13 touchdowns rushing ad Mansfield Legacy advanced to the 5A Division II state semifinals. Catalon suffered a season-ending knee injury in the first game of his senior season. Catalon was rated a four-star recruit and committed to play college football at Arkansas over offers from Oklahoma, TCU and Texas.

== College career ==
Catalon redshirted his true freshman season at Arkansas after appearing in four games. He became a starter going into his redshirt freshman season and recorded 99 tackles, 3 interceptions, 2 forced fumbles and 7 pass breakups and was named first team All-Southeastern Conference (SEC) by the Associated Press and a freshman All-American by the Football Writers Association of America.

In 2023 he transferred to Texas where he played in 8 games.

On December 4, 2023, Catalon entered the transfer portal for the second time and on January 6, 2024, he transferred to UNLV. At UNLV he played in 14 games and led the Mountain West Conference in interceptions(5), interception yards(95) and interception TDs(1).

In 2025 he entered the transfer portal again, and this time wound up at Missouri.
