= Rakeem Boyd =

American football player (born 1998)

Profile
- Position: Running back

Personal information
- Born: February 18, 1998 (age 28); New Orleans, Louisiana, U.S.
- Listed height: 6 ft 0 in (1.83 m)
- Listed weight: 206 lb (93 kg)

Career information
- High school: Stratford (Houston, Texas)
- College: Texas A&M (2016); Independence CC (2017); Arkansas (2018–2020)
- NFL draft: 2021: undrafted

Career history
- Detroit Lions (2021)*
- * Offseason or practice squad member only
- Stats at Pro Football Reference

Rakeem Boyd (born February 18, 1998) is an American former professional football running back. He played college football for the Texas A&M Aggies and Arkansas Razorbacks. He also played junior college football for the Independence Pirates.

== Early life ==
Boyd attended Stratford High School in Houston, Texas. During his high school career, he rushed for 6,436 yards and 80 touchdowns. He committed to Texas A&M University to play college football.

== College career ==
Boyd spent one year with the Texas A&M Aggies, before transferring to Independence Community College. In his one season for the Independence Pirates, he rushed for 1,211 yards with 14 touchdowns. While at Independence, he was featured in the third season of the Netflix documentary series Last Chance U, where he played under head coach Jason Brown. After the season, he transferred to the University of Arkansas to play for the Arkansas Razorbacks. During his first year at Arkansas in 2018, Boyd played in all 12 games and started the final eight. He finished the season with 734 yards on 123 carries with two touchdowns. As a junior in 2019, he started all 12 games, rushing for 1,133 yards on 184 carries and eight touchdowns. On December 1, 2020, he opted out of the remainder of his senior season and declared for the 2021 NFL draft.

== Professional career ==
Pre-draft measurables
Height	Weight	Arm length	Hand span	40-yard dash	10-yard split	20-yard split	20-yard shuttle	Three-cone drill	Vertical jump	Broad jump	Bench press
5 ft 11 3/8 in (1.81 m)	213 lb (97 kg)	32 1/2 in (0.83 m)	8 5/8 in (0.22 m)	4.68 s	1.60 s	2.69 s	4.38 s	7.22 s	32.5 in (0.83 m)	8 ft 2 in (2.49 m)	6 reps
All values from Pro Day

Boyd signed with the Detroit Lions as an undrafted free agent on May 3, 2021. He was waived with an injury settlement on June 4.
