= 2021 All-SEC football team =

American college football all-star team

The 2021 All-SEC football team consists of American football players selected to the All-Southeastern Conference (SEC) chosen by the Associated Press (AP) and the conference coaches for the 2021 Southeastern Conference football season.

Alabama won the conference, beating Georgia 41–24 in the SEC Championship.

Alabama quarterback Bryce Young was voted the conference's Offensive Player of the Year (AP and Coaches). Alabama outside linebacker Will Anderson Jr. was voted the Defensive Player of the Year (AP and Coaches). Alabama wide receiver Jameson Williams and Tennessee wide receiver Velus Jones Jr. shared SEC Special Teams Player of the Year honors (Coaches). Georgia tight end Brock Bowers was voted SEC Newcomer/Freshman of the Year (AP and Coaches). Kirby Smart of Georgia was voted SEC Coach of the Year (AP and Coaches) for the second time.

== Offensive selections ==
=== Quarterbacks ===
- Bryce Young, Alabama (AP-1, Coaches-1)
- Matt Corral, Ole Miss (AP-2, Coaches-2)

=== Running backs ===
- Tyler Badie, Missouri (AP-1, Coaches-1)
- Brian Robinson Jr., Alabama (AP-2, Coaches-1)
- Chris Rodriguez Jr., Kentucky (AP-1, Coaches-2)
- Isaiah Spiller, Texas A&M (AP-2, Coaches-2)

=== Wide receivers ===
- Jameson Williams, Alabama (AP-1, Coaches-1)
- Treylon Burks, Arkansas (AP-1, Coaches-1)
- John Metchie III, Alabama (AP-2, Coaches-2)
- Wan'Dale Robinson, Kentucky (AP-2, Coaches-2)

=== Centers ===
- Luke Fortner, Kentucky (Coaches-1)
- Michael Maietti, Missouri (AP-1, Coaches-2)
- Ricky Stromberg, Arkansas (AP-2)

=== Offensive line ===
- Charles Cross, Mississippi State (AP-1, Coaches-1)
- Kenyon Green, Texas A&M (AP-1, Coaches-1)
- Darian Kinnard, Kentucky (AP-1, Coaches-1)
- Evan Neal, Alabama (AP-1, Coaches-1)
- Cade Mays, Tennessee (AP-2, Coaches-2)
- Jamaree Salyer, Georgia (AP-2, Coaches-2)
- Justin Shaffer, Georgia (AP-2, Coaches-2)
- Ed Ingram, LSU (Coaches-2)
- Layden Robinson, Texas A&M (AP-2)

=== Tight ends ===
- Brock Bowers, Georgia (AP-1, Coaches-1)
- Jalen Wydermyer, Texas A&M (AP-2, Coaches-2)

== Defensive selections ==
=== Defensive ends ===
- Sam Williams, Ole Miss (AP-1, Coaches-1)
- DeMarvin Leal, Texas A&M, Ole Miss (AP-1, Coaches-1)
- Josh Paschal, Kentucky (AP-1, Coaches-2)
- Derick Hall, Auburn (AP-2, Coaches-2)
- Tyree Johnson, Texas A&M (AP-2)

=== Defensive tackles ===
- Jordan Davis, Georgia (AP-1, Coaches-1)
- Devonte Wyatt, Georgia (AP-2, Coaches-1)
- Jalen Carter, Georgia (Coaches-2)
- Neil Farrell Jr., LSU (AP-2)
- Phidarian Mathis, Alabama (Coaches-2)

=== Linebackers ===
- Will Anderson Jr., Alabama (AP-1, Coaches-1)
- Nakobe Dean, Georgia (AP-1, Coaches-1)
- Damone Clark, LSU (AP-1, Coaches-1)
- Bumper Pool, Arkansas (AP-2, Coaches-2)
- Zakoby McClain, Auburn (AP-2, Coaches-2)
- Channing Tindall, Georgia (AP-2)
- Henry To'oTo'o, Alabama (Coaches-2)

=== Defensive backs ===
- Jordan Battle, Alabama (AP-1, Coaches-1)
- Jaylan Foster, South Carolina (AP-1, Coaches-1)
- Roger McCreary, Auburn (AP-1, Coaches-1)
- Lewis Cine, Georgia (AP-1, Coaches-2)
- Montaric Brown, Arkansas (Coaches-1)
- Derion Kendrick, Georgia (AP-2, Coaches-2)
- Jalyn Armour-Davis, Alabama (Coaches-2)
- A. J. Finley, Ole Miss (AP-2)
- Emmanuel Forbes, Mississippi State (Coaches-2)
- Theo Jackson, Tennessee (Coaches-2)
- Antonio Johnson, Texas A&M (AP-2)
- Cam Smith, South Carolina (AP-2)

== Special teams ==
=== Kickers ===
- Harrison Mevis, Missouri (AP-1, Coaches-1)
- Cade York, LSU (AP-2, Coaches-2)

=== Punters ===
- Jake Camarda, Georgia (AP-2, Coaches-1)
- Nik Constantinou, Texas A&M (AP-1, Coaches-2)

=== All purpose/return specialist ===
- Velus Jones Jr., Tennessee (AP-1, Coaches-1)
- Jameson Williams, Alabama (AP-2, Coaches-2)
- Jerrion Ealy, Ole Miss (Coaches-2)

== Key ==
Bold = Consensus first-team selection by both the coaches and AP

AP = Associated Press

Coaches = Selected by the SEC coaches

== See also ==
- 2021 Southeastern Conference football season
- 2021 College Football All-America Team
- Southeastern Conference football individual awards
