= 2021 Georgia Bulldogs football team =

American college football season

2021 Georgia Bulldogs football

Consensus national champion SEC Eastern Division champion Orange Bowl champion

SEC Championship Game, L 24–41 vs. Alabama

Orange Bowl (CFP semifinal), W 34–11 vs. Michigan CFP National Championship, W 33–18 vs. Alabama
- Conference: Southeastern Conference
- Eastern Division

Ranking
- Coaches: No. 1
- AP: No. 1
- Record: 14–1 (8–0 SEC)
- Head coach: Kirby Smart (6th season)
- Offensive coordinator: Todd Monken (2nd season)
- Offensive scheme: Pro spread
- Co-defensive coordinators: Dan Lanning (3rd season); Glenn Schumann (3rd season)
- Base defense: 3–4
- Home stadium: Sanford Stadium

Uniform
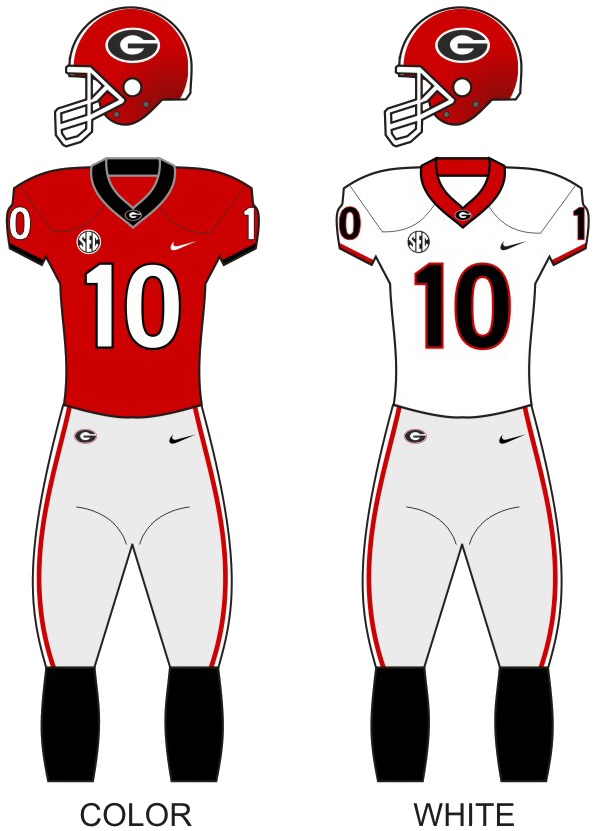

2021 Southeastern Conference football standings
	Conf.			Overall
Team	W		L	W		L
Eastern Division
No. 1 Georgia x#^	8	–	0	14	–	1
No. 18 Kentucky*	5	–	3	10	–	3
Tennessee	4	–	4	7	–	6
Missouri	3	–	5	6	–	7
South Carolina	3	–	5	7	–	6
Florida	2	–	6	6	–	7
Vanderbilt	0	–	8	2	–	10
Western Division
No. 2 Alabama x$^	7	–	1	13	–	2
No. 11 Ole Miss	6	–	2	10	–	3
No. 21 Arkansas	4	–	4	9	–	4
Mississippi State	4	–	4	7	–	6
Texas A&M	4	–	4	8	–	4
Auburn	3	–	5	6	–	7
LSU	3	–	5	6	–	7
Championship: Alabama 41, Georgia 24
# – College Football Playoff champion; ^ – College Football Playoff participant; $ – Conference champion; x – Division champion/co-champions; * – Kentucky vacated all wins due to NCAA violations.; Rankings from AP Poll

The 2021 Georgia Bulldogs football team represented the University of Georgia in the 2021 NCAA Division I FBS football season. The Bulldogs played their home games at Sanford Stadium in Athens, Georgia, and competed in the Eastern Division of the Southeastern Conference (SEC). They were led by sixth-year head coach Kirby Smart. They finished the season with 14 wins and 1 loss (14–1 overall, 8–0 in the SEC). Georgia won the National Championship and was the consensus No. 1 team at the conclusion of the season. The 14 games won by the Bulldogs also set the record for the most wins in a single season in school history until it was broken the following season, where Georgia finished with a 15–0 record.

This season is one of two back-to-back Georgia seasons that won a national championship. In the 2021 season, Georgia won 33–18 against Alabama, and in the 2022 season, Georgia won 65–7 against TCU.

The Bulldogs made it to the College Football Playoff for the first time since 2017. After defeating Michigan in the semifinals, they defeated Alabama to win their first national championship since 1980. This was the first time a No. 3 team has won the CFP National Championship. It also marked the first time in the history of college football, since the Associated Press poll began in 1936, that a college football team had won an AP National Championship after losing their respective conference championship game in the same season. The Bulldogs are also the last team to win the national championship without winning their respective conference championship game until the 2024 Ohio State Buckeyes.

National Championship Celebration at Sanford Stadium in January 2022

Some experts have viewed the 2021 Bulldogs as having one of the greatest defenses in college football history.

== Offseason ==
=== SEC Media Days ===
Media poll (East Division)
Predicted finish	Team	Votes (1st place)
1	Georgia	923 (124)
2	Florida	784 (7)
3	Kentucky	624 (2)
4	Missouri	555
5	Tennessee	362
6	South Carolina	355 (1)
7	Vanderbilt	149

Media poll (SEC Championship)
Place	Team	Votes
1	Alabama	84
2	Georgia	45
3	Ole Miss	1
4	Texas A&M	1
4	Florida	1
4	Kentucky	1
4	South Carolina	1

=== Preseason All-SEC teams ===
The Bulldogs had eleven players selected to the preseason all-SEC teams.

Offense

2nd team

JT Daniels – QB

Zamir White - RB

George Pickens - WR

Jamaree Salyer – OL

3rd team

Jermaine Burton – WR

Defense

1st team

Jordan Davis – DL

3rd team

Travon Walker – DL

Nakobe Dean – LB

Lewis Cine - DB

Specialists

1st team

Jake Camarda – P

3rd team

Kearis Jackson - RS

=== Transfers ===
Outgoing

The Bulldogs lost 13 players via transfer from the 2020 season. They gained 3 players for the 2021 season.

Name	No.	Pos.	Height	Weight	Hometown	Year	New school
Demetris Robertson	#16	WR	6’0	190	Savannah, GA	Sophomore	Auburn
Major Burns	#20	DB	6’2	175	Baton Rouge, LA	Freshman	LSU
Tommy Bush	#12	WR	6’5	195	Schertz, TX	(redshirt) Sophomore	North Texas
John Seter	#16	QB	6’3	180	Athens, Ga	Junior	SMU
Tyrique Stevenson	#7	CB	6’0	202	Miami, Fla	Senior	Miami
Matt Landers	#5	WR	6’5	200	Saint Petersburg, FL	Junior	Toledo
Prather Hudson	#24	DB	5’11	200	Columbus, Ga	Senior	Illinois
Jermaine Johnson II	#11	DL	6’5	262	Eden Prairie, MN	(redshirt) Senior	Florida State
Netori Johnson	#72	DL	6'4	325	Ellenwood, GA	(redshirt) Junior	Middle Tennessee
Makiya Tongue	#19	WR	6’2	223	Baton Rouge, LA	Junior	Oregon State
Trey Blount	#14	WR	6’2	211	Atlanta, GA	Junior	Old Dominion
D'Wan Mathis	#2	QB	6’1	235	Oak Park, Mich	(redshirt) Freshman	Temple
Kolby Wyatt	#82	TE	6’4	240	San Diego, Cal	Senior	Hawaii

Incoming

Name	No.	Pos.	Height	Weight	Year	Hometown	Prev. school
Tykee Smith	#23	CB	5'10"	198	Junior	Philadelphia, PA	West Virginia
Derion Kendrick	#11	CB	6'0"	190	Sophomore	Rock Hill, SC	Clemson
Arik Gilbert	#14	TE	6'5"	248	Sophomore	Marietta, GA	LSU

== Roster ==
2021 Georgia Bulldogs football team roster
Players
Coaches
Offense

Pos.	#	Name	Class
TE	0	Darnell Washington	So
WR	1	George Pickens	Jr
RB	2	Kendall Milton	So
RB	3	Zamir White	Jr
RB	4	James Cook	Sr
WR	5	Adonai Mitchell	Fr
RB	6	Kenny McIntosh	Jr
WR	7	Jermaine Burton	So
WR	8	Dominick Blaylock	So
WR	9	Justin Robinson	Fr
WR	10	Kearis Jackson	Jr
WR	11	Arian Smith	Fr
QB	12	Brock Vandagriff	Fr
QB	13	Stetson Bennett	Sr
WR	14	Arik Gilbert	Jr
QB	14	Jackson Muschamp	Fr
QB	15	Carson Beck	Fr
WR	17	Jackson Meeks	Fr
QB	18	JT Daniels	Jr
TE	19	Brock Bowers	Fr
RB	20	Sevaughn Clark	So
WR	23	Jaylen Johnson	Jr
TE	24	Matthew Brown	Jr
QB	24	Nathan Priestley	So
QB	26	Collin Drake	Fr
RB	28	Anthony Summey	So
RB	32	Cash Jones	Fr
RB	33	Daijun Edwards	So
RB	36	Garrett Jones	Jr
WR	37	Woody Waters	Fr
WR	39	Brady Tindall	Fr
TE	43	Chase Harof	Sr
TE	44	Michael Hagerty	So
RB	45	Kurt Knisely	Fr
RB	49	Gleaton Jones	Fr
OL	50	Warren Ericson	Jr
OL	51	Tate Ratledge	Fr
OL	52	Cameron Kinnie	Fr
OL	53	Dylan Fairchild	Fr
OL	54	Justin Shaffer	Sr
OL	55	Jared Wilson	Fr
OL	56	Micah Morris	Fr
OL	58	Austin Blaske	Fr
OL	59	Broderick Jones	Fr
OL	60	Clay Webb	So
OL	61	Blake Watson	Jr
OL	63	Sedrick Van Pran-Granger	Fr
OL	65	Amarius Mims	Fr
OL	67	John Ferguson	Fr
OL	68	Chris Brown	Fr
OL	69	Jamaree Salyer	Sr
OL	70	Warren McClendon	So
OL	73	Xavier Truss	So
OL	75	Owen Condon	Jr
OL	76	Miles Johnson	Fr
OL	77	Devin Willock	Fr
OL	78	Chad Lindberg	Fr
TE	80	Brett Seither	So
WR	81	Marcus Rosemy-Jacksaint	So
WR	82	Logan Johnson	Fr
WR	84	Ladd McConkey	Fr
TE	85	Drew Sheehan	So
TE	86	John FitzPatrick	Jr
WR	87	Mekhi Mews	Fr
TE	88	Ryland Goede	So
WR	89	Braxton Hicks	Sr

Defense

Pos.	#	Name	Class
LB	0	Rian Davis	So
DB	1	Nylan Green	Fr
LB	2	Smael Mondon Jr.	Fr
DB	3	Kamari Lassiter	Fr
LB	4	Nolan Smith	Jr
DB	5	Kelee Ringo	Fr
CB	6	Jalen Kimber	Fr
ILB	7	Quay Walker	Sr
OLB	8	M. J. Sherman	So
DB	9	Ameer Speed	Sr
LB	10	Jamon Dumas-Johnson	Fr
DB	11	Derion Kendrick	Sr
LB	12	Lovasea Carroll	Fr
DB	14	David Daniel	Fr
ILB	15	Trezmen Marshall	So
DB	16	Lewis Cine	Jr
LB	17	Nakobe Dean	Jr
LB	18	Xavian Sorey Jr.	Fr
OLB	19	Adam Anderson	Sr
DB	22	Javon Bullard	Fr
DB	23	Tykee Smith	Jr
DB	26	Jehlen Cannady	Fr
DB	29	Christopher Smith II	Sr
DB	31	William Poole	Sr
LB	32	Chaz Chambliss	Fr
OLB	33	Robert Beal Jr.	Sr
LB	35	John Staton IV	GS
DB	36	Latavious Brini	Sr
DB	37	Drew Southern	Fr
LB	38	Patrick Taylor	Fr
ILB	41	Channing Tindall	Sr
ILB	42	Graham Collins	Fr
DB	43	Matthew Helow	Fr
DL	44	Travon Walker	Jr
DL	45	Bill Norton	So
DB	46	Payton Bowles	Fr
DB	47	Dan Jackson	So
DB	48	Wesley Potter	Jr
ILB	54	Cade Brock	Fr
DL	45	Marlin Dean	Fr
LB	57	Luke Collins	Fr
DL	78	Nazir Stackhouse	So
DL	88	Jalen Carter	So
DL	89	Malcolm Brown	Fr
DL	90	Tramel Walthour	Jr
DL	91	Tymon Mitchell	So
DL	92	Julian Rochester	Sr
DL	93	Tyrion Ingram-Dawkins	Fr
DL	94	Jonathan Jefferson	Fr
DL	95	Devonte Wyatt	Sr
DL	96	Zion Logue	So
DT	97	Warren Brinson	So
DL	98	Tyler Malakius	So
DL	99	Jordan Davis	Sr

Special teams

Pos.	#	Name	Class
LS	47	Payne Walker	Jr
LS	56	William Mote	So
LS	66	Jonathan Washburn	Fr
K/P	90	Jake Camarda	Sr
P	92	Landon Stratton	Sr
P	95	Noah Chumley	So
K	96	Jack Podlesny	Jr
K/P	97	Matthew Sumlin	Fr
P	98	Noah Jones	Fr
K	99	Jared Zirkel	Fr

Head coach

- Kirby Smart

Coordinators/assistant coaches

- Todd Monken – Offensive coordinator
- Dan Lanning – Defensive coordinator/outside linebackers
- Glenn Schumann – Co-defensive coordinator/inside linebackers
- Scott Cochran – Special teams coordinator
- Dell McGee – Run game coordinator/running backs
- Cortez Hankton– Pass game coordinator/wide receivers
- Tray Scott – Defensive line/assistant head coach
- Matt Luke – Offensive line/associate head coach
- Todd Hartley – Tight ends
- Jahmile Addae – Defensive backs/assistant head coach
- Scott Sinclair – Director, strength and conditioning
- Rodney Price – Assistant, strength and conditioning
- Maurice Sims – Assistant, strength and conditioning
- Ben Sowders – Assistant, strength and conditioning
- Tersoo Uhaa – Assistant, strength and conditioning
- Buster Faulkner – Quality control, offense
- Montgomery Vangorder – Quality control, offense
- Bryant Gross-Armiento – Quality control, defense
- Davis Merritt – Quality control, defense
- Robert Muschamp – Quality control, defense
- Matt Godwin – Player personnel coordinator
- Josh Lee – Director, football operations
- Neyland Raper – Assistant director of football operations
- Anna Courson – Assistant, football operations
- Lewis Freeman – Assistant, football operations
- Jonas Jennings – Director, player development
- Juwan Taylor – Assistant director, player development
- Austin Chambers – Assistant, player development
- Matt Godwin – Director, player personnel
- Ann Hunt – Administrative associate to the head coach
- Katie Turner – Director, recruiting
- Christina Harris – Director, recruiting administration
- Collier Madaleno – Director, football performance nutrition
- Meaghan Turcotte – Football sports nutritionist
- Will Muschamp – Defense analyst
- Rashawn Scott – Intern, offense
- Chandler Eldridge – Director, football creative design
- Eric Black – Director, of football creative design
- Chad Morehead – Co-director, of football creative design

Legend

- (C) Team captain
- (S) Suspended
- (I) Ineligible
- Injured
- Redshirt

Roster
Last update: 10/12/21

== Schedule ==
=== Spring game ===
The Bulldogs held the Georgia football spring game, "G-Day", on April 17. The Red Team beat the Black Team 28–23. Due to COVID-19 the games capacity was limited to just over 20,000 fans.

=== Regular season ===
Georgia announced its 2021 schedule on January 27, 2021. It consisted of six home games, four away games, and two neutral site games. The Bulldogs hosted SEC foes Arkansas, Kentucky, Missouri, and South Carolina. The Bulldogs traveled to face Auburn, Tennessee, and Vanderbilt. Georgia played Florida in Jacksonville, Florida.

Georgia's out of conference opponents represented the ACC, C-USA and Big South. The Bulldogs played four non-conference games which were against UAB from the Conference USA, Charleston Southern from the Big South, Georgia Tech from the ACC, and Clemson from the ACC in Charlotte, North Carolina in the Duke's Mayo Classic.

Date	Time	Opponent	Rank	Site	TV	Result	Attendance
September 4	7:30 p.m.	vs. No. 3 Clemson*	No. 5	Bank of America Stadium; Charlotte, NC (Duke's Mayo Classic / rivalry / College GameDay)	ABC	W 10–3	74,187
September 11	3:30 p.m.	UAB*	No. 2	Sanford Stadium; Athens, GA	ESPN2	W 56–7	92,746
September 18	7:00 p.m.	South Carolina	No. 2	Sanford Stadium; Athens, GA (rivalry)	ESPN	W 40–13	92,746
September 25	12:00 p.m.	at Vanderbilt	No. 2	Vanderbilt Stadium; Nashville, TN (rivalry)	SECN	W 62–0	32,178
October 2	12:00 p.m.	No. 8 Arkansas	No. 2	Sanford Stadium; Athens, GA (College GameDay)	ESPN	W 37–0	92,746
October 9	3:30 p.m.	at No. 18 Auburn	No. 2	Jordan–Hare Stadium; Auburn, AL (Deep South's Oldest Rivalry)	CBS	W 34–10	87,451
October 16	3:30 p.m.	No. 11 Kentucky^{†}	No. 1	Sanford Stadium; Athens, GA (College GameDay / SEC Nation)	CBS	W 30–13	92,746
October 30	3:30 p.m.	vs. Florida	No. 1	TIAA Bank Field; Jacksonville, FL (rivalry / SEC Nation)	CBS	W 34–7	76,141
November 6	12:00 p.m.	Missouri	No. 1	Sanford Stadium; Athens, GA	ESPN	W 43–6	92,746
November 13	3:30 p.m.	at Tennessee	No. 1	Neyland Stadium; Knoxville, TN (rivalry / SEC Nation)	CBS	W 41–17	100,074
November 20	12:00 p.m.	Charleston Southern*	No. 1	Sanford Stadium; Athens, GA	ESPN+/SECN+	W 56–7	92,746
November 27	12:00 p.m.	at Georgia Tech*	No. 1	Bobby Dodd Stadium; Atlanta, GA (Clean, Old-Fashioned Hate)	ABC	W 45–0	52,806
December 4	4:00 p.m.	vs. No. 3 Alabama	No. 1	Mercedes-Benz Stadium; Atlanta, GA (SEC Championship Game / College GameDay / SEC Nation / rivalry)	CBS	L 24–41	78,030
December 31	7:30 p.m.	vs. No. 2 Michigan*	No. 3	Hard Rock Stadium; Miami Gardens, FL (Orange Bowl–CFP Semifinal / College GameDay)	ESPN	W 34–11	66,839
January 10, 2022	8:00 p.m.	vs. No. 1 Alabama	No. 3	Lucas Oil Stadium; Indianapolis, IN (CFP National Championship / College Gameday / SEC Nation / rivalry)	ESPN	W 33–18	68,311
*Non-conference game; ^{†}Homecoming; Rankings from AP Poll (and CFP Rankings, after November 2) - Released prior to game; All times are in Eastern time

== Coaching staff ==
Name	Position	Consecutive season at Georgia in current position
Kirby Smart	Head coach	6th
Todd Monken	Offensive coordinator / quarterbacks coach	2nd
Matt Luke	Associate head coach / Offensive line coach	2nd
Scott Cochran	Special teams coordinator	2nd
Dan Lanning	Defensive coordinator/outside linebackers coach	3rd
Glenn Schumann	Co-defensive coordinator/Inside linebackers coach	3rd
Cortez Hankton	Pass game coordinator/Wide receivers coach	4th
Dell McGee	Run game coordinator/Running backs coach	3rd
Todd Hartley	Tight ends coach	3rd
Jahmile Addae	Defensive backs coach	1st
Tray Scott	Defensive line coach	5th

Analysts

- Will Muschamp

== Game summaries ==
=== vs No. 3 Clemson ===
Nolan Smith (#4, upper right), outside linebacker with the Bulldogs, during a game against the Clemson Tigers on September 4, 2021.

Game One – No. 5 Georgia Bulldogs (0–0) at No. 3 Clemson Tigers (0–0)

Quarter	1	2	3	4	Total
No. 5 Georgia	0	7	3	0	10
No. 3 Clemson	0	0	0	3	3

at Bank of America Stadium • Charlotte, North Carolina

- Date: Saturday, September 4, 2021
- Game time: 7:30 p.m. EST
- Game weather: Clear • Temperature: 73 °F (23 °C) • Wind:
- Game attendance: 74,187
- Referee: Jason Autrey
- TV announcers (ABC): Chris Fowler (play-by-play), Kirk Herbstreit (color) and Holly Rowe (sideline)

Game information

First quarter

no scoring

Second quarter

- (2:58) UGA – Christopher Smith II 74 Yd Interception Return, Jack Podlesny Kick (Georgia 7–0)

Third quarter

- (2:38) UGA – Jack Podlesny 22 Yd Field Goal (Georgia 10–0)

Fourth quarter

- (9:08) CLEM – B. T. Potter 22 Yd Field Goal (Georgia 10–3)

Statistics	UGA	CLEM
First downs	15	14
Plays–yards	61–256	60–180
Rushes–yards	121	2
Passing yards	135	178
Passing: comp–att–int	22–30–1	19–37–1
Turnovers		
Time of possession	31:29	28:31

Team	Category	Player	Statistics
Georgia	Passing	JT Daniels	22/30, 135 yards
Georgia	Rushing	Zamir White	13 carries, 74 yards
Georgia	Receiving	Brock Bowers	6 receptions, 43 yards
Clemson	Passing	DJ Uiagalelei	19/37, 178 yards
Clemson	Rushing	Lyn-J Dixon	1 carry, 10 yards
Clemson	Receiving	Joseph Ngata	6 receptions, 110 yards

=== vs UAB ===
Game Two – UAB Blazers (1–0) at No. 2 Georgia Bulldogs (1–0)

Quarter	1	2	3	4	Total
UAB	0	0	0	7	7
No. 2 Georgia	21	14	14	7	56

at Sanford Stadium • Athens, Georgia

- Date: Saturday, September 11, 2021
- Game time: 3:30 p.m. EST
- Game weather: Partly Cloudy • Temperature - 82 °F (28 °C) • Wind: Variable at 3MPH
- Game attendance: 92,746
- Referee: Lee Hedrick
- TV announcers (ESPN 2): Mark Jones (play-by-play), Robert Griffin III (color) and Quint Kessenich (sideline)

Game information

First quarter

- (14:22) UGA – Jermaine Burton 73 Yd pass from Stetson Bennett (Jack Podlesny Kick) (Georgia 7–0)
- (10:17) UGA – Kenny McIntosh 12 Yd pass from Stetson Bennett (Jack Podlesny Kick) (Georgia 14–0)
- (1:14) UGA – Brock Bowers 89 Yd pass from Stetson Bennett (Jack Podlesny Kick) (Georgia 21–0)

Second quarter

- (14:09) UGA – Arian Smith 61 Yd pass from Stetson Bennett (Jack Podlesny Kick) (Georgia 28–0)
- (1:13) UGA – Brock Bowers 9 Yd pass from Stetson Bennett (Jack Podlesny Kick) (Georgia 35–0)

Third quarter

- (8:42) UGA - James Cook 14 Yd Run (Jack Podlesny Kick) (Georgia 42-0)
- (7:11) UGA - Justin Robinson 12 Yd pass from Carson Beck (Jack Podlesny Kick) (Georgia 49-0)

Fourth quarter

- (10:14) UGA - Jamon Dumas-Johnson 20 Yd Interception Return (Jack Podlesny Kick) (Georgia 56-0)
- (5:02) UAB - Keondre Swoopes 61 Yd Interception Return (Matt Quinn Kick) (Georgia 56-7)

Statistics	UAB	UGA
First downs	11	23
Plays–yards	53-174	60-539
Rushes–yards	127	163
Passing yards	47	376
Passing: comp–att–int	8-17-3	14-22-1
Turnovers		
Time of possession	30:39	29:21

Team	Category	Player	Statistics
UAB	Passing	Tyler Johnson III	6/14, 39 yards, 3 INT
UAB	Rushing	DeWayne McBride	13 carries, 61 yards
UAB	Receiving	Lucious Stanley	1 reception, 17 yards
Georgia	Passing	Stetson Bennett	10/12, 288 yards, 5 TD
Georgia	Rushing	Zamir White	7 carries, 34 yards
Georgia	Receiving	Brock Bowers	3 receptions, 107 yards, 2 TD

=== vs South Carolina ===
Quay Walker, linebacker with the University of Georgia Bulldogs, attempts to sack quarterback Luke Doty during a game against the South Carolina Gamecocks on September 18, 2021.

Game Three – South Carolina Gamecocks (2–0) at No. 2 Georgia Bulldogs (2–0)

Quarter	1	2	3	4	Total
South Carolina	6	0	0	7	13
No. 2 Georgia	14	12	14	0	40

at Sanford Stadium • Athens, Georgia

- Date: Saturday, September 18, 2021
- Game time: 7:10 p.m. EST
- Game weather: Mostly Cloudy • Temperature - 77 °F (25 °C) • Wind - SSE at 5MPH
- Game attendance: 92,746
- Referee: Ken Williamson
- TV announcers (ESPN): Sean McDonough (play-by-play), Todd Blackledge (color) and Molly McGrath (sideline)

Game information

First quarter

- (12:21) UGA – James Cook 23 Yd Run (Jack Podlesny Kick) (Georgia 7–0)
- (8:51) SC – Parker White 37 Yd Field Goal (Georgia 7–3)
- (7:00) UGA – Jermaine Burton 43 Yd pass from JT Daniels (Jack Podlesny Kick) (Georgia 14–3)
- (1:34) SC – Parker White 27 Yd Field Goal) (Georgia 14–6)

Second quarter

- (6:06) UGA – Adonai Mitchell 38 Yd pass from JT Daniels (Jack Podlesny Kick) (Georgia 21–6)
- (0:24) UGA – Team Safety (Georgia 23–6)
- (0:01) UGA – Jack Podlesny 36 Yd Field Goal (Georgia 26–6)

Third quarter

- (13:57) UGA – Zamir White 5 Yd Run (Jack Podlesny Kick) (Georgia 33–6)
- (7:37) UGA – James Cook 4 Yd pass from JT Daniels (Jack Podlesny Kick) (Georgia 40–6)

Fourth quarter

- (10:55) SC – Josh Vann 36 Yd pass from Luke Doty (Parker White Kick) (Georgia 40–13)

Statistics	SC	UGA
First downs	13	26
Plays–yards	63–296	66–491
Rushes–yards	82	184
Passing yards	214	307
Passing: comp–att–int	24–29–1	24–35–2
Turnovers		
Time of possession	31:58	28:02

Team	Category	Player	Statistics
SC	Passing	Luke Doty	13/26, 153 yards, 1 TD, 1 INT
SC	Rushing	ZaQuandre White	5 carries, 31 yards
SC	Receiving	Josh Vann	3 receptions, 128 yards, 1 TD
Georgia	Passing	JT Daniels	23/31, 303 yards, 3 TD
Georgia	Rushing	Kendall Milton	10 carries, 66 yards
Georgia	Receiving	Adonai Mitchell	4 receptions, 77 yards, 1 TD

=== vs Vanderbilt ===
Game Four – No. 2 Georgia Bulldogs (3–0) at Vanderbilt Commodores (1–2)

Quarter	1	2	3	4	Total
No. 2 Georgia	35	3	17	7	62
Vanderbilt	0	0	0	0	0

at Vanderbilt Stadium • Nashville, Tennessee

- Date: Saturday, September 25, 2021
- Game time: 12:00 p.m. EST
- Game weather: Clear • Temperature -
- Game attendance: 32,178
- Referee: David Smith
- TV announcers (SEC Network): Taylor Zarzour (play-by-play), Matt Stinchcomb (color) and Alyssa Lang (sideline)

Game information

First quarter

- (11:21) UGA – Brock Bowers 12 Yd Run (Jack Podlesny Kick) (Georgia 7–0)
- (8:02) UGA – Brock Bowers 25 Yd pass from JT Daniels (Jack Podlesny Kick) (Georgia 14–0)
- (7:11) UGA – Zamir White 1 Yd Run (Jack Podlesny Kick) (Jack Podlesny Kick) (Georgia 21–0)
- (6:42) UGA – Ladd McConkey 12 Yd pass from JT Daniels (Jack Podlesny Kick)) (Georgia 28–0)
- (3:08) UGA – Ladd McConkey 24 Yd Run (Jack Podlesny Kick) (Georgia 35–0)

Second quarter

- (0:15) UGA – Jack Podlesny 31 Yd Field Goal (Georgia 38–0)

Third quarter

- (10:57) UGA - Brock Bowers 29 Yd pass from Stetson Bennett (Jack Podlesny Kick) (Georgia 45-0)
- (8:11) UGA - Kenny McIntosh 4 Yd Run (Jack Podlesny Kick) (Georgia 52-0)
- (4:17) UGA - Jack Podlesny 36 Yd Field Goal (Georgia 55-0)

Fourth quarter

- (13:06) UGA - Daijun Edwards 15 Yd Run (Jack Podlesny Kick) (Georgia 62-0)

Statistics	UGA	VAN
First downs	28	4
Plays–yards	76-532	46-77
Rushes–yards	241	53
Passing yards	291	24
Passing: comp–att–int	21-28-1	5-18-2
Turnovers		
Time of possession	37:16	22:44

Team	Category	Player	Statistics
UGA	Passing	Stetson Bennett	11/15, 151 yards, 1 TD, 1 INT
UGA	Rushing	Zamir White	9 carries, 48 yards, 1 TD
UGA	Receiving	Brock Bowers	4 receptions, 69 yards, 2 TD
VAN	Passing	Mike Wright	3/9, 16 yards, 1 INT
VAN	Rushing	Mike Wright	8 carries, 41 yards
VAN	Receiving	Cam Johnson	1 reception, 10 yards

=== vs No. 8 Arkansas ===
Game Five – No. 8 Arkansas Razorbacks (4–0) at No. 2 Georgia Bulldogs (4–0)

Quarter	1	2	3	4	Total
No. 8 Arkansas	0	0	0	0	0
No. 2 Georgia	21	3	3	10	37

at Sanford Stadium • Athens, Georgia

- Date: Saturday, October 2, 2021
- Game time: 12:00 p.m. EST
- Game weather: Mostly cloudy • Temperature: 76 °F (24 °C) • Wind: SSW 3 mph
- Game attendance: 92,746
- Referee: Jason Autrey
- TV announcers (ESPN): Chris Fowler (play-by-play), Kirk Herbstreit (color) and Holly Rowe (sideline)
- Game summary: ESPN

Game information

First quarter

- (10:46) UGA – Zamir White 3 Yd Run (Jack Podlesny Kick) (Georgia 7–0)
- (4:34) UGA – Kendall Milton 1 Yd Run (Jack Podlesny Kick) (Georgia 14–0)
- (2:17) UGA – Zamir White 0 Yd Return of Blocked Punt (Jack Podlesny Kick) (Georgia 21–0)

Second quarter

- (7:38) UGA – Jack Podlesny 46 Yd Field Goal (Georgia 24–0)

Third quarter

- (10:05) UGA - Jack Podlesny 30 Yd Field Goal (Georgia 27-0)

Fourth quarter

- (12:12) UGA - Zamir White 15 Yd Run (Jack Podlesny Kick) (Georgia 34-0)
- (3:46) UGA - Jack Podlesny 37 Yd Field Goal (Georgia 37-0)

Statistics	ARK	UGA
First downs	10	22
Plays–yards	45–162	68–345
Rushes–yards	29–75	57–273
Passing yards	87	72
Passing: comp–att–int	10–16–0	7–11–0
Turnovers		
Time of possession	23:18	36:42

Team	Category	Player	Statistics
ARK	Passing	KJ Jefferson	8-13, 65 yards
ARK	Rushing	AJ Green	6 carries, 28 yards
ARK	Receiving	Raheim Sanders	1 reception, 17 yards
Georgia	Passing	Stetson Bennett	7/11, 72 yards
Georgia	Rushing	James Cook	12 carries, 87 yards
Georgia	Receiving	Kenny McIntosh	1 reception, 27 yards

=== vs No. 18 Auburn ===
Game Six – No. 2 Georgia Bulldogs (5–0) at No. 18 Auburn Tigers (4–1)

Quarter	1	2	3	4	Total
No. 2 Georgia	3	14	7	10	34
No. 18 Auburn	3	0	7	0	10

at Jordan-Hare Stadium • Auburn, Alabama

- Date: Saturday, October 9, 2021
- Game time: 3:30 p.m. EST
- Game weather: Sunny • Temperature: 81 °F (27 °C) • Wind: NE 6 mph
- Game attendance: 87,451
- Referee: Ken Williamson
- TV announcers (CBS): Noah Eagle (Play by Play), Aaron Murray, (color), Rick Neuheisel (color) and Jenny Dell (sideline)
- Game summary: ESPN

Game information

First quarter

- (8:19) AUB – Anders Carlson 24 Yd Field Goal (Auburn 3–0)
- (2:55) UGA – Jack Podlesny 23 Yd Field Goal (Tied 3–3)

Second quarter

- (14:39) UGA – Zamir White 1 Yd Run (Jack Podlesny Kick) (Georgia 10–3)
- (9:10) UGA – Adonai Mitchell 3 Yd pass from Stetson Bennett (Jack Podlesny Kick) (Georgia 17–3)

Third quarter

- (6:01) UGA - Ladd McConkey 60 Yd pass from Stetson Bennett (Jack Podlesny Kick) (Georgia 24-3)
- (4:01) AUB - Tank Bigsby 6 Yd Run (Anders Carlson Kick) (Georgia 24-10)

Fourth quarter

- (14:52) UGA - Jack Podlesny 21 Yd Field Goal (Georgia 27-10)
- (7:11) UGA - Zamir White 10 Yd Run (Jack Podlesny Kick) (Georgia 34-10)

Statistics	UGA	AUB
First downs	22	17
Plays–yards	70–432	72–318
Rushes–yards	49–201	29–46
Passing yards	231	272
Passing: comp–att–int	14–21–0	24–43–1
Turnovers		
Time of possession	33:06	26:54

Team	Category	Player	Statistics
UGA	Passing	Stetson Bennett	14/21, 231 yards, 2 TD
UGA	Rushing	Zamir White	18 carries, 79 yards, 2 TD
UGA	Receiving	Ladd McConkey	5 receptions, 135 yards, 1 TD
AUB	Passing	Bo Nix	21/38, 217 yards, 1 INT
AUB	Rushing	Tank Bigsby	8 carries, 41 yards
AUB	Receiving	Demetris Robertson	4 receptions, 59 yards

=== vs No. 11 Kentucky ===
Game Seven – No. 11 Kentucky Wildcats (6–0) at No. 1 Georgia Bulldogs (6–0)

Quarter	1	2	3	4	Total
No. 11 Kentucky	0	7	0	6	13
No. 1 Georgia	0	14	10	6	30

at Sanford Stadium • Athens, Georgia

- Date: Saturday, October 16, 2021
- Game time: 3:30 p.m. EST
- Game weather: Clear • Temperature 69 °F (21 °C) • Partly Cloudy: Wind: W @ 15 mph
- Game attendance: 92,746
- Referee: James Carter
- TV announcers (CBS): Brad Nessler (play-by-play), Gary Danielson (color) and Jamie Erdahl (sideline)
- Game summary: ESPN

Game information

First quarter

no scoring

Second quarter

- (14:54) UGA – James Cook 19 Yd pass from Stetson Bennett (Jack Podlesny Kick) (Georgia 7–0)
- (10:35) UGA – Zamir White 24 Yd Run (Jack Podlesny Kick) (Georgia 14–0)
- (3:53) UK – Justin Rigg 1 Yd pass from Will Levis (Matt Ruffolo Kick) (Georgia 14–7)

Third quarter

- (12:13) UGA - Brock Bowers 27 Yd pass from Stetson Bennett (Jack Podlesny Kick) (Georgia 21-7)
- (7:21) UGA - Jack Podlesny 26 Yd Field Goal (Georgia 24-7)

Fourth quarter

- (12:12) UGA - Brock Bowers 20 Yd pass from Stetson Bennett (Jack Podlesny PAT failed) (Georgia 30-7)
- (0:04) UK - Wan'Dale Robinson 1 Yd pass from Will Levis (Matt Ruffolo PAT blocked) (Georgia 30-13)

Statistics	UK	UGA
First downs	16	20
Plays–yards	69-243	47-416
Rushes–yards	27–51	27–166
Passing yards	192	250
Passing: comp–att–int	32-42	14-20
Turnovers		
Time of possession	37:47	22:13

Team	Category	Player	Statistics
UK	Passing	Will Levis	32-42, 192 yards, 2 TD
UK	Rushing	Kavosiey Smoke	5 carries, 14 yards
UK	Receiving	Wan'Dale Robinson	12 receptions, 39 yards, 1 TD
Georgia	Passing	Stetson Bennett	14/20, 250 yards, 3 TD
Georgia	Rushing	James Cook	6 carries, 51 yards
Georgia	Receiving	Brock Bowers	5 receptions, 101 yards, 2 TD

=== vs Florida ===
Game Eight – Florida Gators (4–3) at No. 1 Georgia Bulldogs (7–0)

Quarter	1	2	3	4	Total
Florida	0	0	0	7	7
No. 1 Georgia	0	24	3	7	34

at TIAA Bank Field • Jacksonville, Florida

- Date: Saturday, October 30, 2021
- Game time: 3:30 p.m. EST
- Game weather: Clear • Temperature: 67 °F (19 °C) • Wind: W at 16 mph (26 km/h)
- Game attendance: 76,141
- Referee: David Smith
- TV announcers (CBS): Brad Nessler (play-by-play), Gary Danielson (color) and Jamie Erdahl (sideline)
- Game summary: ESPN

Game information

First quarter

no scoring

Second quarter

- (8:38) UGA – Jack Podlesny 21 Yd Field Goal (Georgia 3–0)
- (2:16) UGA – James Cook 11 Yd Run (Jack Podlesny Kick) (Georgia 10–0)
- (1:35) UGA – Kearis Jackson 36 Yd pass from Stetson Bennett (Jack Podlesny Kick) (Georgia 17–0)
- (0:07) UGA – Nakobe Dean 50 Yd Interception Return (Jack Podlesny Kick) (Georgia 24–0)

Third quarter

- (1:15) UGA – Jack Podlesny 42 Yd Field Goal (Georgia 27–0)

Fourth quarter

- (2:49) FLA – Emory Jones 2 Yd Run (Chris Howard Kick) (Georgia 27–7)
- (1:57) UGA – Zamir White 42 Yd Run (Jack Podlesny Kick) (Georgia 34–7)

Statistics	FLA	UGA
First downs	20	18
Plays–yards	74–355	52–354
Rushes–yards	39–161	33–193
Passing yards	194	161
Passing: comp–att–int	22–35–2	10–19–2
Turnovers		
Time of possession	32:20	27:40

Team	Category	Player	Statistics
FLA	Passing	Emory Jones	10-14, 112 yards
FLA	Rushing	Dameon Pierce	9 carries, 69 yards
FLA	Receiving	Justin Shorter	4 receptions, 50 yards
Georgia	Passing	Stetson Bennett	10/19, 161 yards, 1 TD, 2 INT
Georgia	Rushing	Zamir White	14 carries, 105 yards, 1 TD
Georgia	Receiving	Kearis Jackson	3 receptions, 59 yards, 1 TD

=== vs Missouri ===
Game Nine – Missouri Tigers (4–4) at No. 1 Georgia Bulldogs (8–0)

Quarter	1	2	3	4	Total
Missouri	3	0	0	3	6
No. 1 Georgia	7	19	14	3	43

at Sanford Stadium • Athens, Georgia

- Date: Saturday, November 6, 2021
- Game time: 12:00 p.m. EST
- Game weather: Clear • Temperature -
- Game attendance: 92,746
- Referee: Lee Hedrick
- TV announcers (ESPN): Joe Tessitore (play-by-play), Greg McElroy (color) and Katie George (sideline)
- Game summary: ESPN

Game information

First quarter

- (5:50) MIZ – Harrison Mevis 36 Yd Field Goal (Missouri 3–0)
- (0:42) UGA – Arian Smith 35 Yd pass from Stetson Bennett (Jack Podlesny Kick) (Georgia 7–3)

Second quarter

- (14:12) UGA – G. McKinniss punt blocked by N. Smith for a SAFETY (Georgia 9–3)
- (11:37) UGA – Zamir White 1 Yd Run (Jack Podlesny Kick) (Georgia 16–3)
- (5:05) UGA – Jack Podlesny 20 Yd Field Goal (Georgia 19–3)
- (0:18) UGA – James Cook 1 Yd Run (Jack Podlesny Kick) (Georgia 26–3)

Third quarter

- (12:35) UGA - Jermaine Burton 12 Yd pass from Stetson Bennett (Jack Podlesny Kick) (Georgia 33-3)
- (1:15) UGA - Ladd McConkey 7 Yd pass from JT Daniels (Jack Podlesny Kick) (Georgia 40-3)

Fourth quarter

- (7:58) MIZ - Harrison Mevis 42 Yd Field Goal (Georgia 40-6)
- (2:33) UGA - Jack Podlesny 25 Yd Field Goal (Georgia 43-6)

Statistics	MIZ	UGA
First downs	15	25
Plays–yards	67–273	63–505
Rushes–yards	35–121	33–168
Passing yards	152	337
Passing: comp–att–int	20–32–0	20–30–1
Turnovers		
Time of possession	31:53	28:07

Team	Category	Player	Statistics
MIZ	Passing	Brady Cook	14-19, 78 yards
MIZ	Rushing	Tyler Macon	11 carries, 42 yards
MIZ	Receiving	Tauskie Dove	4 receptions, 84 yards
Georgia	Passing	Stetson Bennett	13/19, 255 yards, 2 TD
Georgia	Rushing	James Cook	9 carries, 41 yards, 1 TD
Georgia	Receiving	Jermaine Burton	3 receptions, 76 yards, 1 TD

=== vs Tennessee ===
Game Ten – No. 1 Georgia Bulldogs (9–0) at Tennessee (5–4)

Quarter	1	2	3	4	Total
No. 1 Georgia	7	17	3	14	41
Tennessee	10	0	0	7	17

at Neyland Stadium • Knoxville, Tennessee

- Date: Saturday, November 13, 2021
- Game time: 3:30 p.m. EST
- Game weather: Clear • Temperature: 49 °F (9 °C)
- Game attendance: 100,074
- Referee: James Carter
- TV announcers (CBS): Brad Nessler (play-by-play), Gary Danielson (color), and Jamie Erdahl (sideline)
- Game summary: ESPN

Game information

First quarter

- (11:43) TENN – Velus Jones Jr. 9 Yd pass from Hendon Hooker (Chase McGrath Kick) (Tennessee 7–0)
- (9:11) UGA – James Cook 39 Yd Run (Jack Podlesny Kick) (Tied 7–7)
- (1:39) TENN – Chase McGrath 24 Yd Field Goal (Tennessee 10–7)

Second quarter

- (9:42) UGA – Jack Podlesny 40 Yd Field Goal (Tied 10–10)
- (7:24) UGA – Stetson Bennett 9 Yd Run (Jack Podlesny Kick) (Georgia 17–10)
- (0:37) UGA – James Cook 23 Yd pass from Stetson Bennett (Jack Podlesny Kick) (Georgia 24–10)

Third quarter

- (4:41) UGA - Jack Podlesny 26 Yd Field Goal (Georgia 27-10)

Fourth quarter

- (13:14) UGA - James Cook 5 Yd Run (Jack Podlesny Kick) (Georgia 34-10)
- (7:03) UGA - Kenny McIntosh 5 Yd Run (Jack Podlesny Kick) (Georgia 41-10)
- (3:38) TENN – Cedric Tillman 12 Yd pass from Joe Milton (Chase McGrath Kick) (Georgia 41–17)

Statistics	UGA	TENN
First downs	26	22
Plays–yards	70–487	84–387
Rushes–yards	41–274	36–55
Passing yards	213	332
Passing: comp–att–int	17–29–0	30–48–1
Turnovers		
Time of possession	32:40	27:20

Team	Category	Player	Statistics
UGA	Passing	Stetson Bennett	17/29, 213 yards, 1 TD
UGA	Rushing	James Cook	10 carries, 104 yards, 2 TD
UGA	Receiving	Adonai Mitchell	5 receptions, 65 yards
TENN	Passing	Hendon Hooker	24/37, 244 yards, 1TD, 1 INT
TENN	Rushing	Jabari Small	12 carries, 49 yards
TENN	Receiving	Cedric Tillman	10 receptions, 200 yards, 1 TD

=== vs Charleston Southern ===
Game Eleven – Charleston Southern Buccaneers (4–5) at No. 1 Georgia Bulldogs (10–0)

Quarter	1	2	3	4	Total
Charleston Southern	0	0	7	0	7
No. 1 Georgia	28	21	7	0	56

at Sanford Stadium • Athens, Georgia

- Date: Saturday, November 20, 2021
- Game time: 12:00 p.m. EST
- Game weather: Clear • Temperature -
- Game attendance: 92,746
- Referee: Matt Loeffler
- TV announcers (ESPN+): Mike Morgan (play-by-play), Charles Arbuckle (color) and Alex Chappell (sideline)
- Game summary: ESPN

Game information

First quarter

- (9:01) UGA – Jordan Davis 1 Yd Run (Jack Podlesny Kick) (Georgia 7–0)
- (5:33) UGA – Kenny McIntosh 32 Yd pass from Stetson Bennett (Jack Podlesny Kick) (Georgia 14–0)
- (4:15) UGA – Zamir White 40 Yd Run (Jack Podlesny Kick) (Georgia 21–0)
- (1:29) UGA – Brock Bowers 4 Yd pass from Stetson Bennett (Jack Podlesny Kick) (Georgia 28–0)

Second quarter

- (13:39) UGA – James Cook 3 Yd Run (Jack Podlesny Kick) (Georgia 35–0)
- (6:40) UGA – Brock Bowers 7 Yd pass from JT Daniels (Jack Podlesny Kick) (Georgia 42–0)
- (1:37) UGA – Daijun Edwards 6 Yd Run (Jack Podlesny Kick) (Georgia 49–0)

Third quarter

- (5:40) CHSO - Garris Schwarting 65 Yd Fumble Return (Sam Babbush Kick) (Georgia 49-7)
- (3:26) UGA - Brett Seither 9 Yd pass from Carson Beck (Jack Podlesny Kick) (Georgia 56-7)

Fourth quarter

no scoring

Statistics	CHSO	UGA
First downs	10	22
Plays–yards	68–126	69–488
Rushes–yards	31–68	32–233
Passing yards	58	255
Passing: comp–att–int	14–37–1	20–37–2
Turnovers		
Time of possession	31:56	28:04

Team	Category	Player	Statistics
CHSO	Passing	Jack Chambers	11/30, 55 yards, 1 INT
CHSO	Rushing	TJ Ruff	14 carries, 46 yards
CHSO	Receiving	Garris Schwarting	3 receptions, 30 yards
Georgia	Passing	Stetson Bennett	8/14, 105 yards, 2 TD, 1 INT
Georgia	Rushing	Zamir White	4 carries, 83 yards, 1 TD
Georgia	Receiving	Brett Seither	2 receptions, 39 yards, 1 TD

=== vs Georgia Tech ===
Game Twelve – No. 1 Georgia Bulldogs (11–0) at Georgia Tech (3–8)

Quarter	1	2	3	4	Total
No. 1 Georgia	10	14	14	7	45
Georgia Tech	0	0	0	0	0

at Bobby Dodd Stadium • Atlanta, Georgia

- Date: Saturday, November 27, 2021
- Game time: 12:00 p.m. EST
- Game weather: Clear • Temperature: 53°F
- Game attendance: 52,806
- Referee: Mike Roche
- TV announcers (ABC): Bob Wischusen (play-by-play), Dan Orlovsky (color), and Kris Budden (sideline)
- Game summary: ESPN

Game information

First quarter

- (10:34) UGA – Jack Podlesny 38 Yd Field Goal (Georgia 3–0)
- (4:38) UGA – Jermaine Burton 25 Yd pass from Stetson Bennett (Jack Podlesny Kick) (Georgia 10–0)

Second quarter

- (13:33) UGA – Ladd McConkey 11 Yd pass from Stetson Bennett (Jack Podlesny Kick) (Georgia 17–0)
- (11:03) UGA – Brock Bowers 77 Yd pass from Stetson Bennett (Jack Podlesny Kick) (Georgia 24–0)

Third quarter

- (9:55) UGA - Brock Bowers 9 Yd pass from Stetson Bennett (Jack Podlesny Kick) (Georgia 31–0)
- (9:55) UGA - Kenny McIntosh 59 Yd Run (Jack Podlesny Kick) (Georgia 38–0)

Fourth quarter

- (13:14) UGA - Daijun Edwards 3 Yd Run (Jack Podlesny Kick) (Georgia 45–0)

Statistics	UGA	GT
First downs	21	9
Plays–yards	51–463	51–166
Rushes–yards	31–208	35–98
Passing yards	255	68
Passing: comp–att–int	14–20–0	8–16–0
Turnovers		
Time of possession	26:52	33:08

Team	Category	Player	Statistics
UGA	Passing	Stetson Bennett	14/20, 255 yards, 4 TD
UGA	Rushing	Kenny McIntosh	2 carries, 66 yards, 1 TD
UGA	Receiving	Brock Bowers	3 receptions, 100 yards, 2 TD
GT	Passing	Jordan Yates	8/16, 68 yards
GT	Rushing	Jordan Mason	14 carries, 59 yards
GT	Receiving	Dylan Leonard	2 receptions, 43 yards

=== vs No. 3 Alabama ===
SEC Championship Game

Quarter	1	2	3	4	Total
No. 1 Georgia	3	14	0	7	24
No. 3 Alabama	0	24	7	10	41

at Mercedes-Benz Stadium • Atlanta, Georgia

- Date: Saturday, December 4, 2021
- Game time: 4:00 p.m. EST
- Game weather: Indoors
- Referee: Ken Williamson
- TV announcers (CBS): Brad Nessler (play-by-play), Gary Danielson (color), Jamie Erdahl (sideline)

Game information

First quarter

- (6:01) UGA – Jack Podlesny 38 yd Field Goal (Georgia 3–0)

Second quarter

- (14:56) UGA – Darnell Washington 5 yd pass from Stetson Bennett (Jack Podlesny Kick) (Georgia 10–0)
- (14:12) ALA – Jameson Williams 67 yd pass from Bryce Young (Will Reichard Kick) (Georgia 10–7)
- (9:46) ALA – John Metchie III 13 yd pass from Bryce Young (Will Reichard Kick) (Alabama 14–10)
- (3:28) ALA – Will Reichard 33 yd Field Goal (Alabama 17–10)
- (2:06) UGA – Ladd McConkey 32 yd pass from Stetson Bennett (Jack Podlesny Kick) (Tied 17–17)
- (0:26) ALA – Bryce Young 11 yd rush (Will Reichard Kick) (Alabama 24–17)

Third quarter

- (13:10) ALA – Jameson Williams 55 yd pass from Bryce Young (Will Reichard Kick) (Alabama 31–17)

Fourth quarter

- (11:59) ALA – Stetson Bennett pass intercepted by Jordan Battle for a 42 yd TD return (Will Reichard KICK) (Alabama 38–17)
- (9:42) UGA – Stetson Bennett pass to Brock Bowers for 18 yds (Jack Podlesny KICK) (Alabama 38–24)

Statistics	ALA	UGA
First downs	25	30
Plays–yards	70-536	78-449
Rushes–yards	115	109
Passing yards	421	340
Passing: comp–att–int	26-44	29-48-2
Turnovers		
Time of possession	25:47	34:13

Team	Category	Player	Statistics
ALA	Passing	Bryce Young	26/44, 421 yards, 3 TD
ALA	Rushing	Brian Robinson Jr.	16 carries, 55 yards, TD
ALA	Receiving	Jameson Williams	7 receptions, 184 yards, 2TD
UGA	Passing	Stetson Bennett	29/48, 340 yards, 3 TD, 2 INT
UGA	Rushing	James Cook	11 carries, 38 yards
UGA	Receiving	Brock Bowers	10 receptions, 139 yards, TD

=== vs No. 2 Michigan ===
.

2021 Orange Bowl

Quarter	1	2	3	4	Total
No. 3 Georgia	14	13	0	7	34
No. 2 Michigan	0	3	0	8	11

at Hard Rock Stadium • Miami Gardens, Florida

- Date: Friday, December 31, 2021
- Game time: 7:30 p.m. EST
- Game weather: Clear • Temperature -
- Game attendance: 66,839
- Referee: Scott Campbell
- TV announcers (ESPN): Chris Fowler (play-by-play), Kirk Herbstreit (color), Holly Rowe (sideline) and Marty Smith (sideline)

Game information

First quarter

- (10:49) UGA – Brock Bowers 9 Yd pass from Stetson Bennett (Jack Podlesny Kick) (Georgia 7–0)
- (4:41) UGA – Adonai Mitchell 18 Yd pass from Kenny McIntosh (Jack Podlesny Kick) (Georgia 14–0)

Second quarter

- (12:26) UGA – Jack Podlesny 43 Yd Field Goal (Georgia 17–0)
- (7:16) MICH – Jake Moody 36 Yd Field Goal (Georgia 17–3)
- (3:50) UGA – Jack Podlesny 28 Yd Field Goal (Georgia 20–3)
- (1:38) UGA – Jermaine Burton 57 Yd pass from Stetson Bennett (Jack Podlesny Kick) (Georgia 27–3)

Third quarter

no scoring

Fourth quarter

- (11:11) UGA - James Cook 39 Yd pass from Stetson Bennett (Jack Podlesny Kick) (Georgia 34-3)
- (4:25) MICH - Andrel Anthony 35 Yd pass from J.J. McCarthy (A. J. Henning Run for Two-Point Conversion) (Georgia 34-11)

Statistics	UGA	MICH
First downs	21	16
Plays–yards	66-521	63-328
Rushes–yards	190	91
Passing yards	331	237
Passing: comp–att–int	21-31	18-36-2
Turnovers		
Time of possession	34:15	25:45

Team	Category	Player	Statistics
UGA	Passing	Stetson Bennett	20/30, 313 yards, 3 TD
UGA	Rushing	Zamir White	12 carries, 54 yards
UGA	Receiving	James Cook	4 receptions, 112 yards, 1 TD
MICH	Passing	J. J. McCarthy	7/17, 131 yards, 1 TD
MICH	Rushing	Hassan Haskins	9 carries, 39 yards
MICH	Receiving	Erick All	4 receptions, 63 yards

=== vs No. 1 Alabama ===
2022 National Championship Game

Quarter	1	2	3	4	Total
No. 3 Georgia	0	6	7	20	33
No. 1 Alabama	3	6	0	9	18

at Lucas Oil Stadium • Indianapolis, Indiana

- Date: Monday, January 10, 2022
- Game time: 8:00 p.m. EST
- Game weather: Clear • Temperature -
- Game attendance: 68,311
- Referee: Duane Heydt
- TV announcers (ESPN): Chris Fowler, (play-by-play), Kirk Herbstreit (color), Holly Rowe (sideline) and Molly McGrath (sideline)

Game information

First quarter

- (9:55) ALA – Will Reichard 37 Yd Field Goal (Alabama 3–0)

Second quarter

- (12:35) UGA – Jack Podlesny 24 Yd Field Goal (Tied 3–3)
- (11:13) ALA – Will Reichard 45 Yd Field Goal (Alabama 6–3)
- (7:07) ALA – Will Reichard 37 Yd Field Goal (Alabama 9–3)
- (3:09) UGA – Jack Podlesny 49 Yd Field Goal (Alabama 9–6)

Third quarter

- (1:20) UGA – Zamir White 1 Yd Run (Jack Podlesny Kick) (Georgia 13–9)

Fourth quarter

- (12:59) ALA – Will Reichard 37 Yd Field Goal (Georgia 13–12)
- (10:14) ALA – Cameron Latu 3 Yd pass from Bryce Young (Two-Point Pass Conversion Failed) (Alabama 18–13)
- (8:09) UGA – Adonai Mitchell 40 Yd pass from Stetson Bennett (Two-Point Run Conversion Failed) (Georgia 19–18)
- (3:33) UGA – Brock Bowers 15 Yd pass from Stetson Bennett (Jack Podlesny Kick) (Georgia 26–18)
- (0:54) UGA – Kelee Ringo 79 Yd Interception Return (Jack Podlesny Kick) (Georgia 33–18)

Statistics	UGA	ALA
First downs	20	22
Plays–yards	66–364	85–399
Rushes–yards	140	30
Passing yards	224	369
Passing: comp–att–int	17–28	35–57–2
Turnovers		
Time of possession	28:29	31:31

Team	Category	Player	Statistics
UGA	Passing	Stetson Bennett	17/26, 224 yards, 2 TD
UGA	Rushing	Zamir White	13 carries, 84 yards, TD
UGA	Receiving	George Pickens	1 reception, 52 yards
ALA	Passing	Bryce Young	35/57, 369 yards, 1 TD, 2 INT
ALA	Rushing	Brian Robinson Jr.	22 carries, 68 yards
ALA	Receiving	Cameron Latu	5 receptions, 102 yards, TD

== Rankings ==
Ranking movements Legend: ██ Increase in ranking ██ Decrease in ranking ( ) = First-place votes
	Week															
Poll	Pre	1	2	3	4	5	6	7	8	9	10	11	12	13	14	Final
AP	5 (3)	2 (4)	2 (3)	2 (3)	2 (4)	2 (9)	1 (62)	1 (63)	1 (63)	1 (63)	1 (63)	1 (62)	1 (62)	1 (62)	3	1 (61)
Coaches	5	2 (1)	2 (1)	2 (1)	2 (1)	2 (2)	1 (64)	1 (65)	1 (64)	1 (64)	1 (64)	1 (62)	1 (62)	1 (62)	3	1 (62)
CFP	Not released									1	1	1	1	1	3	Not released

== Statistics ==
=== Scoring ===
==== Scoring by quarter (non-conference opponents) ====
	1	2	3	4	Total
All opponents	0	3	7	18	28
Georgia	73	69	38	21	201

==== Scoring by quarter (SEC opponents) ====
	1	2	3	4	Total
SEC opponents	25	37	14	49	125
Georgia	90	126	78	84	378

==== Scoring by quarter (all opponents) ====
	1	2	3	4	Total
All opponents	25	40	21	67	153
Georgia	163	195	116	105	579

== Awards and honors ==
Jordan Davis

- Bednarik Award
- Outland Trophy

Nakobe Dean

- Butkus Award

=== Coaches ===
Kirby Smart

- SEC Coach of the Year

=== All-SEC ===
==== First Team ====
TE- Brock Bowers

DT- Jordan Davis

LB- Nakobe Dean

==== Second Team ====
OL- Jamaree Salyer

OL- Justin Shaffer

DT- Devonte Wyatt (AP: 2, Coaches: 1)

DT- Jalen Carter

LB- Channing Tindall

DB- Lewis Cine (AP: 1, Coaches: 2)

DB- Derion Kendrick

P- Jake Camarda (AP: 2, Coaches: 1)

== Players in the NFL draft ==
Fifteen Bulldogs were selected in the 2022 NFL Draft, setting a new record for draft picks from a single school in the seven-round draft era (1994–present).

Player	Position	Team	Round	Pick
Travon Walker	DE	Jacksonville Jaguars	1	1
Jordan Davis	DT	Philadelphia Eagles	1	13
Quay Walker	LB	Green Bay Packers	1	22
Devonte Wyatt	DT	Green Bay Packers	1	28
Lewis Cine	S	Minnesota Vikings	1	32
George Pickens	WR	Pittsburgh Steelers	2	52
James Cook	RB	Buffalo Bills	2	63
Nakobe Dean	LB	Philadelphia Eagles	3	83
Channing Tindall	LB	Miami Dolphins	3	102
Zamir White	RB	Las Vegas Raiders	4	122
Jake Camarda	P	Tampa Bay Buccaneers	4	133
Justin Shaffer	G	Atlanta Falcons	6	190
Jamaree Salyer	G	Los Angeles Chargers	6	195
Derion Kendrick	CB	Los Angeles Rams	6	212
John FitzPatrick	TE	Atlanta Falcons	6	213
