= Jameson Williams =

American football player (born 2001)

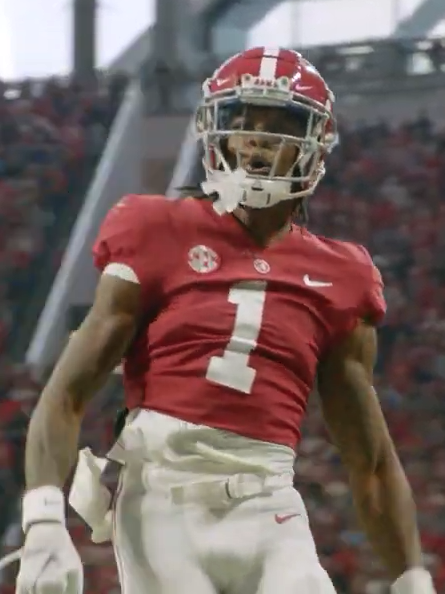
- Williams with the Alabama Crimson Tide in 2021

No. 1 – Detroit Lions
- Position: Wide receiver
- Roster status: Active

Personal information
- Born: March 26, 2001 (age 25); St. Louis, Missouri, U.S.
- Listed height: 6 ft 1 in (1.85 m)
- Listed weight: 184 lb (83 kg)

Career information
- High school: Cardinal Ritter (St. Louis)
- College: Ohio State (2019–2020); Alabama (2021)
- NFL draft: 2022: 1st round, 12th overall pick

Career history
- Detroit Lions (2022–present)

Awards and highlights
- SEC Co-Special Teams Player of the Year (2021); First-team All-American (2021); First-team All-SEC (2021)

Career NFL statistics as of Week 10, 2026
- Receptions: 180
- Receiving yards: 3,031
- Receiving touchdowns: 22
- Rushing yards: 151
- Rushing touchdowns: 2
- Stats at Pro Football Reference

Jameson Demetri Williams (born March 26, 2001), nicknamed "Jamo", is an American professional football wide receiver for the Detroit Lions of the National Football League (NFL). He played college football for the Ohio State Buckeyes before transferring to the Alabama Crimson Tide in 2021, where he was named an All-American. Williams was selected by the Lions in the first round of the 2022 NFL draft.

== Early life ==
Williams was born on March 26, 2001, and grew up in St. Louis, Missouri. He attended Cardinal Ritter College Prep High School and played for their football team. As a junior, Williams caught 36 passes for 1,062 yards and 15 touchdowns and returned three kickoffs for touchdowns. He was named an Under Armour All-American after finishing his senior season with 68 receptions for 1,626 yards and 22 touchdowns. Williams also ran track at Cardinal Ritter and won back-to-back Class 3 state titles in the 300 meter hurdles and set the state record. He was rated a four-star football prospect and committed to play at Ohio State.

Williams has stated that Los Angeles Rams running back Kyren Williams is his first cousin.

== College career ==
=== Ohio State ===
Williams began his collegiate career at Ohio State. He caught six passes for 112 yards and a touchdown in his freshman season. As a sophomore, Williams started six games and had nine receptions for 154 yards and two touchdowns. In the 2021 Sugar Bowl, Williams scored a touchdown on a 45-yard reception against Clemson in the College Football Playoffs Semifinal. After the season, Williams announced that he would transfer to Alabama. Jameson would finish up his Ohio State career winning 2 Big Ten Championships and a college football Playoff Sugar Bowl win. Jameson Williams went on to play in the 2021 National Championship game against Alabama where the Buckeyes went on to lose 52–24.

=== Alabama ===
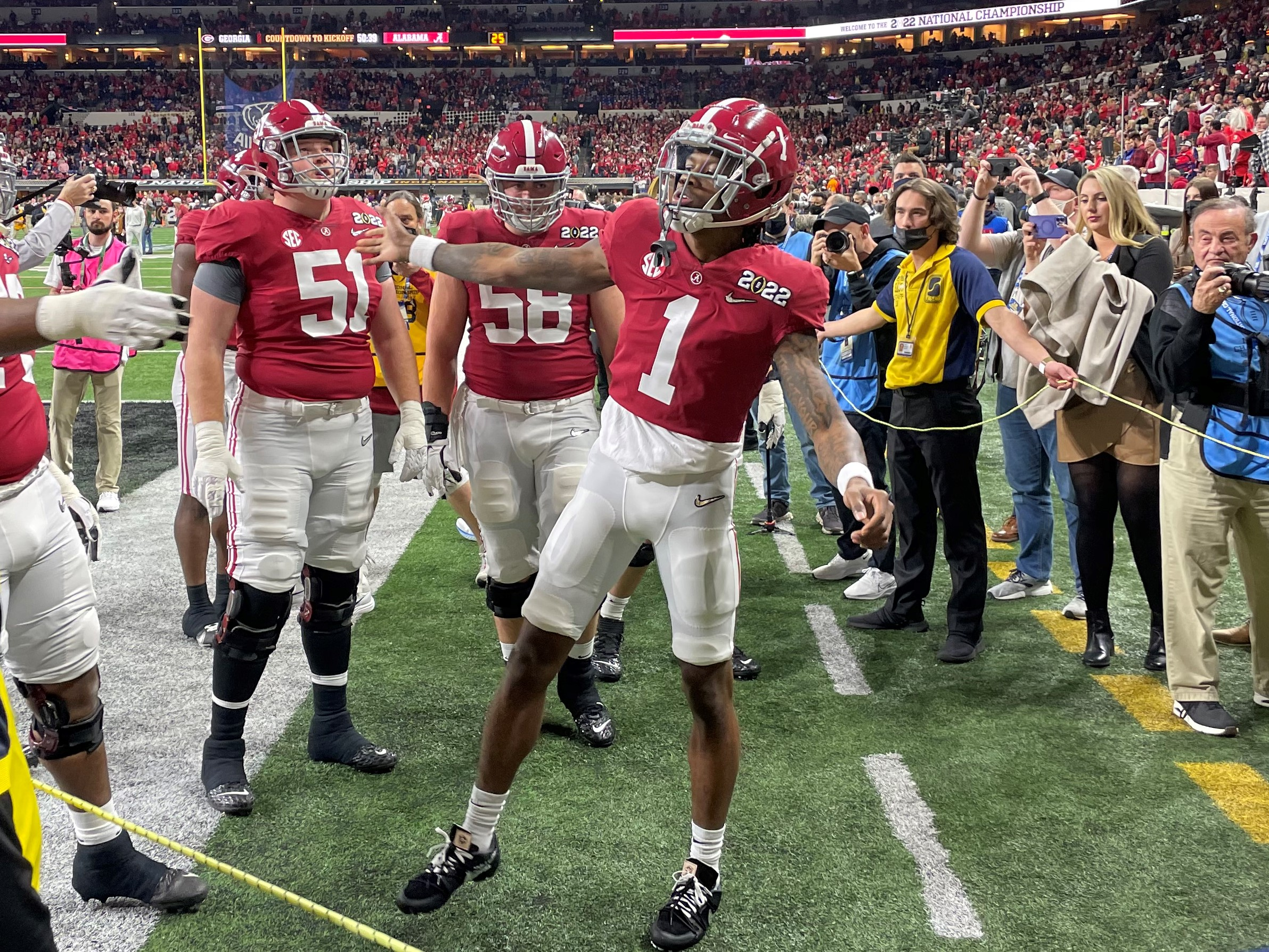
Williams high fives a teammate ahead of the 2022 CFP title game

Williams was named a starter for the Crimson Tide going into his first season with the team. He made an instant impact with four receptions for 126 receiving yards and one touchdown in a 44–13 victory over Miami in the Chick-fil-A Kickoff Game. He was named the Southeastern Conference (SEC) Special Teams Player of the Week for week 4 after returning three kickoffs for 177 yards and two touchdowns and also caught an 81-yard touchdown pass in a 63–14 win over Southern Miss. He had ten receptions for 146 receiving yards and two touchdowns in the 41–38 loss to Texas A&M on October 9. On November 6, he had ten receptions for 160 receiving yards and one touchdown in a 20–14 victory over LSU. One week later, he had six receptions for 158 yards and three touchdowns in a 59–3 victory over New Mexico State. In the following game, against Arkansas, he had eight receptions for 190 receiving yards and three touchdowns in the 42–35 victory. In the SEC Championship, a 41–24 victory over Georgia, he had seven receptions for 184 receiving yards and two touchdowns. Williams was named first-team All-SEC and All-American as well as second-team All-SEC as a return specialist and the conference's co-Special Teams Player of the Year. Williams suffered a torn ACL in the 2022 College Football Playoff National Championship rematch with Georgia. He finished the 2021 season with 79 receptions for 1,572 yards and 15 touchdowns. He led the SEC in receiving yards, yards per reception, and receiving touchdowns. He declared for the 2022 NFL draft following the championship game and began to rehab from the injury. Jameson would finish up his Alabama career with a 2021 SEC Championship and a 2021 Cotton Bowl win.

== Professional career ==
Pre-draft measurables
Height	Weight	Arm length	Hand span	Wingspan
6 ft 1 1/2 in (1.87 m)	179 lb (81 kg)	32 1/8 in (0.82 m)	9 1/4 in (0.23 m)	6 ft 3 7/8 in (1.93 m)
All values from NFL Combine

=== 2022 season ===
Williams was selected by the Detroit Lions in the first round (12th overall) of the 2022 NFL draft. The pick was acquired with a second-round pick (used for Josh Paschal) via a trade with the Minnesota Vikings for Detroit's first, second, and third-round picks.

He was placed on the reserve/non-football injury list to start the season on August 23, 2022, due to the torn ACL suffered in college. Williams returned to practice on November 21, 2022, and was activated on December 3, prior to week 13. He made his debut against the Jacksonville Jaguars, logging zero catches on one target in the Lions 40–14 victory. The next week, his first career reception was a 41-yard receiving touchdown, contributing to a 34–23 victory over the same Minnesota Vikings team who traded his pick away. In week 17, he had a 40-yard rush in a 41–10 victory over the Chicago Bears.

=== 2023 season ===
Williams was one of four Lions players suspended for violating the NFL's gambling policy after an investigation by the league. The announcement was made in an NFL press release on April 21, 2023. The other Lions players were Stanley Berryhill, Quintez Cephus, and C. J. Moore. Cephus and Moore were suspended indefinitely for betting on NFL games, as was Washington Commanders defensive end Shaka Toney. Williams and Berryhill were suspended for six games due to mobile betting on a college football game that occurred at a hotel room during a team road trip, in violation of league rules. Williams' ban was lifted on October 3 after only four games, two weeks shorter than originally announced.

In his season debut in week 5 against the Carolina Panthers, Williams caught two passes for two yards while having a dropped pass as well. In week 6 against the Tampa Bay Buccaneers, Williams caught two of his three targets for 53 yards, which included a 45-yard touchdown catch. In the 2023 season, Williams appeared in 12 games and started ten. He finished with 24 receptions for 354 receiving yards and two receiving touchdowns to go with a rushing touchdown. In the NFC Championship, he had a receiving touchdown and a rushing touchdown in the 34–31 loss to the 49ers.

=== 2024 season ===
In Week One against the Los Angeles Rams, Williams caught a career-high five passes for 121 yards and one touchdown. Williams was suspended for two games on October 21, 2024, for violating the NFL's Performance-Enhancing Substances policy. On the suspension, Williams stated he was disappointed by the suspension but responded that he had "no choice but to take it on the chin." During Week Nine against the Jacksonville Jaguars, Williams caught four passes and set a new career-high of 124 yards and one touchdown. He finished the season with 58 receptions for 1,001 yards and 7 touchdowns, and 11 rushes for 61 yards and a touchdown. In the Divisional Round game against the Washington Commanders, Williams rushed for a 61-yard touchdown, made one 19-yard reception, and threw one interception, ultimately ending in a 31–45 loss.

=== 2025 season ===
The Lions picked up the fifth-year option on Williams' contract. On September 6, 2025, Williams signed a three-year contract extension worth up to $83 million. In Week 10 of the 2025 season, Williams had six receptions for 119 yards and a touchdown in the 44–22 win. In Week 13 against the Packers, he had seven receptions for 144 yards and a touchdown in the 31–24 loss. In Week 15, against the Rams, he had seven receptions for 134 yards and a touchdown in the 41–34 loss. In the 2025 season, he had 65 receptions for 1,117 yards and seven receiving touchdowns.

== Career statistics ==
Legend
**Bold**	Career high

=== NFL ===
==== Regular season ====
Year	Team	Games		Receiving						Rushing					Fumbles	
Year	Team	GP	GS	Tgt	Rec	Yds	Avg	Lng	TD	Att	Yds	Avg	Lng	TD	Fum	Lost
2022	DET	6	0	9	1	41	**41.0**	41	1	1	40	**40.0**	**40**	0	0	0
2023	DET	12	10	42	24	354	14.8	63	2	3	29	9.7	19	**1**	**1**	0
2024	DET	15	11	91	58	1,001	17.3	**82**	**7**	**11**	**61**	5.5	15	**1**	0	0
2025	DET	17	15	**102**	**65**	**1,117**	17.2	64	**7**	6	12	2.0	9	0	0	0
2026	DET	9	9	53	32	518	16.1	49	5	1	9	9.0	9	0	0	0
Career		59	45	297	180	3,031	16.8	82	22	22	151	6.9	40	2	1	0

==== Postseason ====
Year	Team	Games		Receiving						Rushing					Fumbles	
Year	Team	GP	GS	Tgt	Rec	Yds	Avg	Lng	TD	Att	Yds	Avg	Lng	TD	Fum	Lost
2023	DET	3	2	**9**	**6**	**79**	13.2	**24**	**1**	**1**	42	42.0	42	**1**	0	0
2024	DET	1	1	4	1	19	**19**	19	0	**1**	**61**	**61.0**	**61**	**1**	0	0
Career		4	3	13	7	98	14.0	24	1	2	103	51.5	61	2	0	0

=== College ===
Season	Team	GP	Receiving					Rushing				
Season	Team	GP	Rec	Yds	Avg	Lng	TD	Att	Yds	Avg	Lng	TD
2019	Ohio State	4	6	112	18.7	61	1	0	0	0.0	0	0
2020	Ohio State	6	9	154	17.1	45	2	0	0	0.0	0	0
2021	Alabama	15	**79**	**1,572**	**19.9**	**94**	**15**	**3**	**23**	**7.7**	**18**	0
Career		25	94	1,838	19.6	61	18	3	23	7.7	18	0

== Personal life ==
Jameson's cousin Kyren Williams is a running back for the Los Angeles Rams.
