= Jamaree Salyer =

American football player (born 2000)

No. 63 – Arizona Cardinals
- Position: Guard
- Roster status: Practice squad

Personal information
- Born: July 13, 2000 (age 26); Atlanta, Georgia, U.S.
- Listed height: 6 ft 4 in (1.93 m)
- Listed weight: 325 lb (147 kg)

Career information
- High school: Pace (Atlanta)
- College: Georgia (2018–2021)
- NFL draft: 2022: 6th round, 195th overall pick

Career history
- Los Angeles Chargers (2022–2025); Miami Dolphins (2026)*; Arizona Cardinals (2026–present)*
- * Offseason or practice squad member only

Awards and highlights
- CFP national champion (2021); Second-team All-American (2021); Second-team All-SEC (2021)

Career NFL statistics as of 2025
- Games played: 64
- Games started: 40
- Stats at Pro Football Reference

Jamaree Tyreez Salyer (born July 13, 2000) is an American professional football guard for the Arizona Cardinals of the National Football League (NFL). He played college football for the Georgia Bulldogs and was selected by the Los Angeles Chargers in the sixth round of the 2022 NFL draft.

== Early life ==
Salyer grew up in Atlanta, Georgia and attended Pace Academy. Salyer was rated a five-star recruit and committed to play college football at the University of Georgia after considering offers from Alabama, Clemson, and Ohio State.

== College career ==
Salyer played in 13 games as a reserve offensive lineman during his freshman season. He played in 13 games with two starts as a sophomore and started at right tackle in Georgia's 26–14 win over Baylor in the 2020 Sugar Bowl. Salyer was named Georgia's starting left tackle going into his junior season after reporting to preseason training camp 30 pounds lighter than the previous season and putting together a strong performance. He started all of the Bulldogs' regular season games at left tackle and started in the 2021 Peach Bowl at left guard. After considering entering the 2021 NFL draft, he decided to return to Georgia for his senior season. On January 15, 2022, Salyer declared for the 2022 NFL draft.

== Professional career ==
Pre-draft measurables
| Height | Weight | Arm length | Hand span | Wingspan | 20-yard shuttle | Vertical jump | Broad jump | Bench press |
|---|---|---|---|---|---|---|---|---|
| 6 ft 3 in (1.91 m) | 321 lb (146 kg) | 33 5/8 in (0.85 m) | 10 in (0.25 m) | 6 ft 8 1/4 in (2.04 m) | 4.70 s | 24.0 in (0.61 m) | 8 ft 2 in (2.49 m) | 31 reps |
All values from NFL Combine/Pro Day

=== Los Angeles Chargers ===
Salyer was selected by the Los Angeles Chargers in the sixth round, 195th overall, of the 2022 NFL draft. He was thrust into the starting lineup in Week 4 following an injury to left tackle Rashawn Slater, and remained the starter the rest of the season. Salyer started in all 17 games for the Chargers in the 2023 season. In the 2024 season, he appeared in all 17 games and started four.

=== Miami Dolphins ===
On March 13, 2026, Salyer signed with the Miami Dolphins. On August 16, he was placed on injured reserve due to a knee injury, ending his season. Salyer was released by the Dolphins on August 25.

=== Arizona Cardinals ===
On November 11, 2026, Salyer signed with the Arizona Cardinals practice squad.
