= Brock Bowers =

American football player (born 2002)

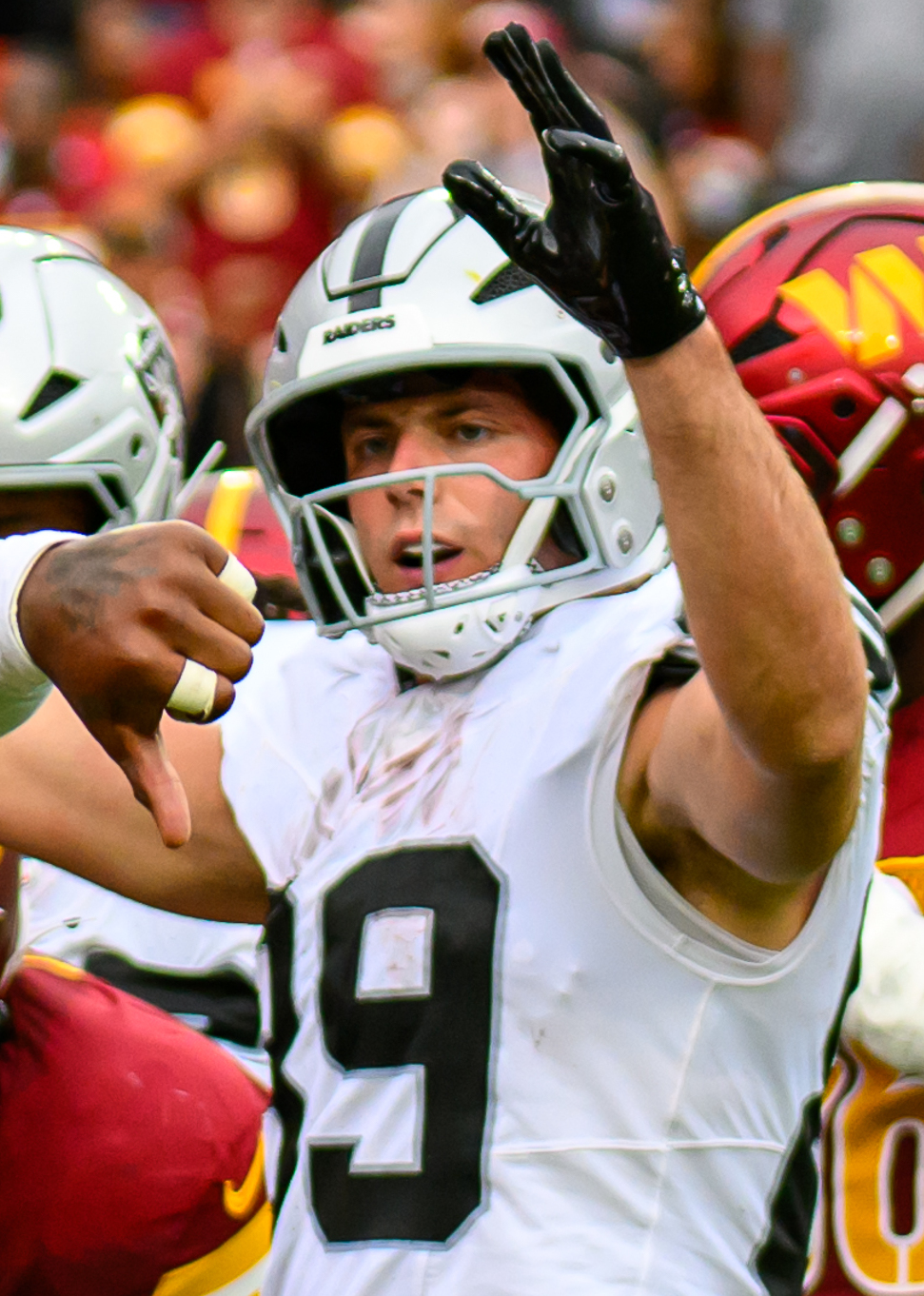
- Bowers with the Las Vegas Raiders in 2025

No. 89 – Las Vegas Raiders
- Position: Tight end
- Roster status: Active

Personal information
- Born: December 13, 2002 (age 23); Napa, California, U.S.
- Listed height: 6 ft 4 in (1.93 m)
- Listed weight: 235 lb (107 kg)

Career information
- High school: Napa
- College: Georgia (2021–2023)
- NFL draft: 2024: 1st round, 13th overall pick

Career history
- Las Vegas Raiders (2024–present)

Awards and highlights
- First-team All-Pro (2024); 2× Pro Bowl (2024, 2025); PFWA All-Rookie Team (2024); 2× CFP national champion (2021, 2022); 2× John Mackey Award (2022, 2023); Unanimous All-American (2023); First-team All-American (2022); Second-team All-American (2021); Shaun Alexander Freshman of the Year (2021); SEC Freshman of the Year (2021); 3× First-team All-SEC (2021–2023); First-team AP All-Time All-American (2024); NFL records: Receptions in a rookie season: 112; Receiving yards in a rookie season by a tight end: 1,194; Career receiving yards per game by a tight end (Note: Minimum 200 career receptions.): 68.9

Career NFL statistics as of Week 10, 2026
- Receptions: 226
- Receiving yards: 2,550
- Receiving touchdowns: 18
- Stats at Pro Football Reference

Brock Allen Bowers (born December 13, 2002) is an American professional football tight end for the Las Vegas Raiders of the National Football League (NFL). Bowers played college football for the Georgia Bulldogs, where he was a three-time All-American, two-time John Mackey Award winner, and won two national championships. He was selected by the Raiders in the first round of the 2024 NFL draft, setting rookie season records for receptions in a season and the most receiving yards by a tight end, earning Pro Bowl and All-Pro honors.

== Early life ==
Bowers was born on December 13, 2002, in Napa, California. His parents met at Utah State University, where his mother was an All-American softball player who was later inducted into the school's athletic Hall of Fame and his father was an All-Big West center on the school's football team. After graduating, his mother became a high school math teacher and softball coach, while his father founded a construction company. His sister plays softball at Sacramento State. Growing up Bowers played a variety of sports including football, basketball, baseball and soccer.

Bowers attended Napa High School, where he played football and basketball. As a freshman he played quarterback for the school's junior varsity team, running the triple option. Bowers joined the varsity team as a sophomore, playing tight end and linebacker, then received his first college offer from Nevada. Following his sophomore season, he attended a Nike camp where his athleticism gained the attention of college scouts and led to him receiving about a dozen offers. As a junior, Bowers accounted for 1,499 all-purpose yards and set a school record with 14 touchdown receptions, helping lead Napa to the state playoffs just one year after the team finished 0–10. For his efforts he was named the Napa County Player of the Year.

Bowers entered his senior season as a preseason All-American but the season was canceled due to COVID-19 restrictions in California. Unable to play or train due to restrictions, he stayed in shape by running up and down the hills of Napa. Despite not playing as a senior, he would still be named to the All-American Bowl.

=== Recruiting ===
Bowers was a highly sought-after prospect, deemed a four-star recruit and the second-ranked tight end of his class by 247Sports, although some programs such as Notre Dame would recruit him as a linebacker. Despite being from the West Coast, Bowers wanted to play college football in the South due to the region's passion for the sport, later stating "It is a little different (in the South) — people just care a lot more about football, it's like a religion out here." He ultimately committed to play college football at the University of Georgia under Kirby Smart, citing his relationship with the team's tight ends coach Todd Hartley and a desire to play as a freshman as additional factors in his commitment.

College recruiting
Name	Hometown	School	Height	Weight	40^{‡}	Commit date
Brock Bowers; TE	Napa, California	Napa High School	6 ft 4 in (1.93 m)	240 lb (110 kg)	N/A	Aug 10, 2020
Brock Bowers; TE	Recruit ratings: Rivals: 247Sports: ESPN: (83)					
Overall recruit ranking: Rivals: 8 (TE) 247Sports: 2 (TE) ESPN: 4 (TE)
Note: In many cases, Scout, Rivals, 247Sports, On3, and ESPN may conflict in their listings of height and weight.; In these cases, the average was taken. ESPN grades are on a 100-point scale.; Sources: "2020 Team Ranking". Rivals.com.

== College career ==
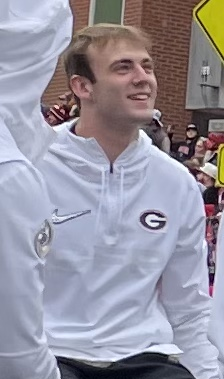
Bowers at Georgia's Championship Parade in 2022

=== 2021 ===
An early enrollee, Bowers arrived at Georgia in January 2021. As a true freshman, he was originally set to share playing time with fellow tights ends Darnell Washington and Arik Gilbert. However, Washington broke his foot and Gilbert stepped away from the team for personal reasons, leaving Bowers as the team's primary option at tight end. In his first career game, Bowers led the Bulldogs in receiving with six catches for 43 yards in a 10–3 win over Clemson. The following week against UAB, he caught his first two touchdowns, including a career-long 89-yard reception, and recorded his first 100-yard performance in a 56–7 win. Two weeks later against Vanderbilt, Bowers caught two touchdowns and rushed for another en route to a 62-0 blowout victory. On October 16, he had another 100-yard performance, catching five passes for 101 yards and two touchdowns in a 30–13 defeat of Kentucky. Bowers had additional multi-touchdown performances against Charleston Southern and rival Georgia Tech. In the SEC Championship Game against Alabama, Bowers caught 10 passes (the most by a tight end in SEC Championship history) for a then career-high 139 yards and a touchdown in the Bulldogs 41–24 loss, their first of the season. Despite the loss to Alabama, Georgia qualified for the College Football Playoff as the third seed. In the Orange Bowl semifinal against Michigan, Bowers made five receptions for 55 yards and a touchdown in a 34–11 win, sending Georgia to the national championship game. In the championship game, Georgia faced off against Alabama, who had handed the Bulldogs their lone loss of the season a month prior. Bowers caught four passes in the game, including a crucial touchdown with just over three minutes remaining which extended the Bulldogs' lead to eight points. Georgia defeated Alabama 33–18, capturing their first national championship since 1980.

At the conclusion of his freshman season, Bowers won the Shaun Alexander Freshman of the Year Award, was named SEC Freshman of the Year, and was selected to the All-SEC first team and All-American second team. He finished the season as Georgia's leading receiver with 56 receptions for 882 yards and a program-record 13 receiving touchdowns. He also had 56 rushing yards and a rushing touchdown.

=== 2022 ===
Following his strong freshman season, Bowers entered the 2022 season with high expectations, and was named a preseason All-American. In the Bulldogs season opener against Oregon, he had two receptions for 38 yards in a 49–3 victory. Two weeks later, against South Carolina, Bowers caught five passes for 121 yards and two touchdowns, while rushing for another touchdown in a 48–7 win. The following week against Kent State, he would have the best game of his career on the ground, rushing for 77 yards and two touchdowns in a 39–22 victory. In the Bulldogs victory over Florida, Bowers recorded a career-high 154 receiving yards on five receptions, including an improbable 73-yard touchdown catch off of a deflection which some media outlets dubbed the "catch of the season". Following a victory over LSU in the SEC Championship, the undefeated Bulldogs advanced to the College Football Playoff as the no. 1 seed. In the Peach Bowl semi-final against Ohio State, Bowers caught four passes for 64 yards, including a crucial fourth down conversion in the final quarter to extend an eventual touchdown drive. Georgia would defeat Ohio State 42–41 to advance to the national championship. In the championship game, he caught a season-high seven passes for 152 yards and a touchdown on his final catch of the year to help Georgia capture their second consecutive national championship in a 65–7 blowout of TCU, the largest margin of victory in championship history.

At the conclusion of his sophomore season, Bowers was named a first team All-American and won the John Mackey Award for the nation's best tight end. He once again finished the season as Georgia's leading receiver with 63 receptions for 942 yards and seven touchdowns as well as 109 rushing yards and three rushing touchdowns.

=== 2023 ===
Bowers missed three games in 2023 due to an ankle injury, catching 56 passes for 714 yards and six touchdowns in 10 games. He still led Georgia in receptions, receiving yards and touchdowns, something he accomplished in all three of his seasons there.

Despite the lost games, Bowers won the John Mackey Award again in 2023, making him the only two-time winner for that award. He declared for the 2024 NFL draft following the 2023 season. A three-time All-American, he has been cited as among the greatest tight ends in college football history.

== Professional career ==
Pre-draft measurables
Height	Weight	Arm length	Hand span	Wingspan
6 ft 3 1/8 in (1.91 m)	243 lb (110 kg)	32 3/4 in (0.83 m)	9 3/4 in (0.25 m)	6 ft 6 1/4 in (1.99 m)
All values from NFL Combine

=== 2024 season ===
Bowers was selected by the Las Vegas Raiders in the first round with the 13th overall pick in the 2024 NFL draft. On May 9, 2024, Bowers signed a four-year fully-guaranteed contract worth $18.1 million. In his NFL debut, he had six receptions for 58 yards in a 22-10 loss to the Los Angeles Chargers in week 1. In a week 2, 26–23 win over the Baltimore Ravens, Bowers had nine receptions for 98 yards. In week 5, Bowers caught a 57-yard pass for his first NFL touchdown as a part of an eight reception, 97 yard game during an 34-18 loss to the Denver Broncos. In week 10, he had 13 receptions for 126 yards and a touchdown in the 34–19 loss to the Miami Dolphins. In week 12, he had ten receptions for 140 yards and a touchdown in the 19–17 loss to the Kansas City Chiefs.

Bowers played all 17 games of the 2024 season and led the team in receptions, receiving yards, and touchdowns, finishing with 112 catches for 1,194 receiving yards and five receiving touchdowns. His receptions and receiving yards were the highest among all tight ends in the league that season.

Bowers was named First-team All-Pro, earned Pro Bowl honors, and set numerous records with his rookie performance. Bowers broke a 63-year record for most receiving yards by a rookie tight end (1,076 yards), set in 1961 by Hall of Famer Mike Ditka. He broke a league record for the most receptions in a season by a rookie (of any position), set the prior year by wide receiver Puka Nacua (105 catches). He also set a franchise record for the most receptions in a season by a Raider, beating out the 107 catches made by Darren Waller in 2020. He was named to the PFWA All-Rookie Team. He was ranked 24th by his fellow players on the NFL Top 100 Players of 2025.

=== 2025 season ===
In Week 1 against the New England Patriots, Bowers had five receptions for 103 yards before being taken out of the game due to a left knee injury. In spite of damage to his PCL and a bone bruise, he played through weeks 2–4. However, he was sidelined through weeks 5–7 to mitigate the chance of aggravating the injury, with head coach Pete Carroll hinting at his return after the Raiders' bye week in Week 8. In Week 9, upon his return, Bowers caught 12 passes for 123 yards and three touchdowns in a loss against the Jacksonville Jaguars. He made 12 total appearances (eight starts) for Las Vegas, recording 64 receptions for 680 yards and seven touchdowns. On December 24, Bowers was placed on season-ending injured reserve due to a knee injury. He earned Pro Bowl honors for the second time.

=== 2026 season ===
On September 9, 2026, it was reported that Bowers suffered an injury in practice that required a meniscus trim, causing him to miss the first two games of the season. Bowers made his season debut in Week 3 against the New Orleans Saints where he posted 116 yards and a touchdown on 10 receptions in the win, earning him AFC Offensive Player of the Week.

== Career statistics ==
Legend
**Bold**	Career high

=== NFL ===
==== Regular season ====
Year	Team	Games		Receiving					Rushing					Fumbles	
Year	Team	GP	GS	Rec	Yds	Avg	Lng	TD	Att	Yds	Avg	Lng	TD	Fum	Loss
2024	LV	**17**	**16**	**112**	**1,194**	10.7	**57**	5	**5**	**13**	**2.6**	**12**	0	0	0
2025	LV	12	8	64	680	10.6	38	**7**	2	2	1.0	6	0	0	0
2026	LV	8	8	50	676	**13.5**	33	6	1	2	2.0	2	0	**2**	**1**
Career		37	32	226	2,550	11.3	57	18	8	17	2.1	12	0	2	1

=== College ===
Season	Team	Games		Receiving				Rushing			
Season	Team	GP	GS	Rec	Yds	Avg	TD	Att	Yds	Avg	TD
2021	Georgia	15	13	56	882	**15.8**	**13**	4	56	**14.0**	1
2022	Georgia	15	15	**63**	**942**	15.0	7	**9**	**109**	12.1	**3**
2023	Georgia	10	10	56	714	12.8	6	6	28	4.7	1
Career		40	38	175	2,538	14.5	26	19	193	10.2	5

== Career highlights ==
=== NFL records ===
- Most receptions in a single season by a rookie: 112 (2024)
- Most receiving yards in a single season by a rookie tight end: 1,194 (2024)
- Most career receiving yards per game by a tight end (minimum 200 career receptions): 68.9

=== Raiders franchise records ===
- Most receptions in a single season: 112 (2024)
