= Jalen Carter =

American football player (born 2001)

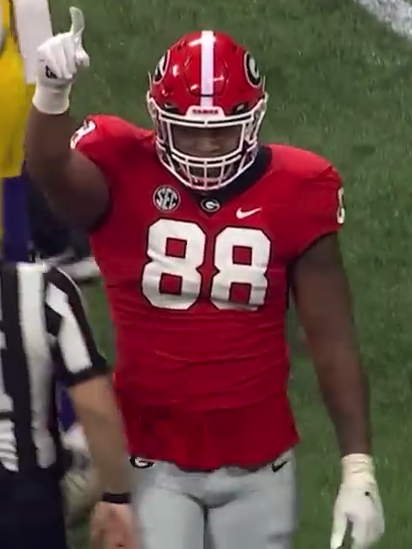
- Carter with Georgia in 2022

No. 98 – Philadelphia Eagles
- Position: Defensive tackle
- Roster status: Active

Personal information
- Born: April 4, 2001 (age 25); Apopka, Florida, U.S.
- Listed height: 6 ft 3 in (1.91 m)
- Listed weight: 314 lb (142 kg)

Career information
- High school: Apopka
- College: Georgia (2020–2022)
- NFL draft: 2023: 1st round, 9th overall pick

Career history
- Philadelphia Eagles (2023–present)

Awards and highlights
- Super Bowl champion (LIX); Second-team All-Pro (2024); 2× Pro Bowl (2024, 2025); PFWA All-Rookie Team (2023); 2× CFP national champion (2021, 2022); Unanimous All-American (2022); First-team All-SEC (2022); Second-team All-SEC (2021)

Career NFL statistics as of Week 5, 2026
- Total tackles: 121
- Sacks: 16.5
- Forced fumbles: 7
- Fumble recoveries: 1
- Pass deflections: 14
- Defensive touchdowns: 1
- Stats at Pro Football Reference

Jalen Da'Quan Carter (born April 4, 2001) is an American professional football defensive tackle for the Philadelphia Eagles of the National Football League (NFL). He played college football for the Georgia Bulldogs, where he was a unanimous All-American in 2022 and a two-time CFP national champion before being selected by the Eagles ninth overall in the 2023 NFL draft. Carter earned second-team All-Pro honors in 2024, and played an instrumental part in helping the Eagles win Super Bowl LIX.

== Early life ==
Jalen Carter was born on April 4, 2001. Carter first played football for the Apopka Raptors, a youth football team in his hometown of Apopka, Florida. Carter was hailed as being a versatile player during his youth football career, he played multiple positions such as running back, cornerback, wide receiver, and outside linebacker. Carter also played quarterback during an AAU 14-under national championship game, where he threw a 70-yard touchdown pass against the Pensacola Browns. In addition to playing football, Carter played basketball for the Raptors Elite AAU team. Carter later attended Apopka High School, where he played tight end, fullback, and punter in addition to defensive tackle. Carter also played multiple sports in high school, including basketball and heavyweight lifting As a senior, he had 12 sacks, 64 tackles, and a touchdown. A five-star recruit ranked the 18th overall prospect in his class, Carter committed to play college football at the University of Georgia.

== College career ==
Carter played in eight games as a freshman, recording 12 tackles and a touchdown reception. In Carter's sophomore season, he tallied 31 tackles and three sacks in 12 games. This performance earned him a spot on the 2021 All-SEC football team. Georgia won the National Championship that year over Alabama. Carter declared for the 2023 NFL draft after the 2023 College Football Playoff National Championship, in which the Bulldogs also won.

== Professional career ==
Pre-draft measurables
Height	Weight	Arm length	Hand span	Wingspan
6 ft 3 in (1.91 m)	314 lb (142 kg)	33 1/2 in (0.85 m)	10 1/4 in (0.26 m)	6 ft 9 in (2.06 m)
All values from the NFL Combine

Carter was selected by the Philadelphia Eagles with the 9th overall pick in the 2023 NFL draft. He signed a four-year, fully guaranteed contract worth approximately $21.8 million, including a signing bonus of $13.2 million. The contract also includes a fifth-year team option for the 2027 season.

=== Philadelphia Eagles ===
==== 2023 season ====
During Carter's first minicamp, he impressed the likes of veteran teammates such as Darius Slay and Lane Johnson, being described by them as a "game changer", and being compared to a "baby Rhino".

Carter made his NFL debut on September 10 against the New England Patriots, and in that same game, he recorded his first career sack on Mac Jones. During the week 14 Sunday Night Football loss to the Dallas Cowboys, defensive tackle Fletcher Cox stripped the ball from quarterback Dak Prescott, and Carter returned the fumble 42 yards for his first NFL touchdown. As a rookie, he appeared in 16 games and made one start. He finished with six sacks, 33 total tackles (20 solo), two forced fumbles, and one fumble recovery. He was named to the PFWA NFL All-Rookie Team. However, Jalen Carter was edged out by Will Anderson Jr. for Defensive Rookie of the Year honors.

==== 2024 season ====
In 2024, Carter was selected to his first Pro Bowl. Following a Week 15 win over the Pittsburgh Steelers, the NFL issued a $11,817 fine on Carter for striking tight end Connor Heyward in the head. In a snowy Divisional Round matchup against the Los Angeles Rams, Carter had a pivotal sack on quarterback Matthew Stafford to force fourth down in the final minute of the fourth quarter. On the next play Carter again got pressure leading to an incompletion which sealed a close 28–22 victory for the Eagles. On February 1, 2025, the league fined Carter $17,445 for the open-handed slap on center Tyler Biadasz that was not flagged in the 2025 NFC Championship win against the Washington Commanders. The Eagles advanced to Super Bowl LIX, where they would defeat the two-time defending champion Kansas City Chiefs 40–22, giving Carter his first Super Bowl title. With the Eagles leading Kansas City 34–0 late in the third quarter, Philadelphia's defensive line received high praise following their dominant performance despite not blitzing a single time, which was widely viewed to be profoundly instrumental to the victory. Carter was one of a dozen Eagles players of the Super Bowl LIX championship team that did not participate in the White House visit in April 2025. Including the postseason, Carter's five forced fumbles since entering the NFL in 2023 are the most of any defensive tackle. He was ranked 43rd by his fellow players on the NFL Top 100 Players of 2025.

==== 2025 season ====
Carter was ejected six seconds into the Eagles' opening night game against the Dallas Cowboys after spitting on Cowboys quarterback Dak Prescott following the opening kickoff. Carter was given an unsportsmanlike conduct penalty, which resulted in disqualification, and was later fined $57,222 by the league. Carter was suspended for one game, though he did not have to serve it, since the league considered his early ejection as a game served.

In Week 17, Carter blocked an extra point attempt that prevented the Buffalo Bills from taking an eight-point lead in the fourth quarter. This later led to a failed game-winning two-point conversion attempt, sealing an Eagles 13-12 win, earning NFC Special Teams Player of the Week.

==== 2026 season ====
On April 27, 2026, the Eagles exercised the fifth-year option on Carter's contract. On July 28, Carter and the Eagles agreed to a four-year contract extension worth $152 million.

== Career statistics ==
Legend
	Won the Super Bowl
	Led the league
**Bold**	Career high

=== NFL ===
==== Regular season ====
Year	Team	Games		Tackles							Fumbles			
Year	Team	GP	GS	Cmb	Solo	Ast	TFL	Sck	Sfty	PD	FF	FR	Yds	TD
2023	PHI	16	1	33	20	13	8	**6.0**	0	0	**2**	**1**	**42**	**1**
2024	PHI	16	15	**42**	**25**	**17**	**12**	4.5	0	6	**2**	0	0	0
2025	PHI	11	11	33	21	12	5	3.0	0	**7**	0	0	0	0
2026	PHI	5	5	13	7	6	5	3.0	0	1	3	0	0	0
Career		48	32	121	73	48	30	16.5	0	14	7	1	42	1

==== Postseason ====
Year	Team	Games		Tackles							Fumbles			
Year	Team	GP	GS	Cmb	Solo	Ast	TFL	Sck	Sfty	PD	FF	FR	Yds	TD
2023	PHI	1	0	2	1	1	0	0.0	0	0	0	0	—	—
2024	PHI	4	4	**9**	**3**	**6**	**2**	**2.0**	0	**3**	**1**	0	—	—
2025	PHI	1	1	3	1	2	1	1.0	0	0	0	0	—	—
Career		6	5	14	5	9	3	3.0	0	3	1	0	0	0

=== College ===
Year	Team	GP	Tackles						Fumbles			
Year	Team	GP	Cmb	Solo	Ast	TFL	Sck	PD	FF	FR	Yds	TD
2020	Georgia	10	14	11	3	3.0	0.0	0	0	0	0	0
2021	Georgia	15	**37**	**17**	**20**	**8.5**	**3.0**	1	0	0	0	0
2022	Georgia	13	32	16	16	7.0	**3.0**	**3**	**2**	0	0	0
Career		38	83	44	39	18.5	6.0	4	2	0	0	0

== Legal issues ==
On January 15, 2023, at approximately 2:45 a.m., a serious car crash occurred resulting in the deaths of University of Georgia staff member Chandler LeCroy and football player Devin Willock. The collision, which occurred in East Athens after the Bulldogs had been celebrating their second consecutive national championship earlier in the evening, was believed by police to have occurred as a result of street racing involving LeCroy, who was driving a 2021 Ford Expedition, and Carter, who was driving a 2021 Jeep Trackhawk. LeCroy, whose blood alcohol content was 0.197, more than twice the legal limit at the time of the crash, veered off the road after failing to make a proper turn at a high speed. She struck at least two utility poles, downing one of them, and trees before the car came to a stop against the door of an apartment building, blocking the resident inside until the wreckage could be cleared away. Willock, who was not wearing his seat belt, was ejected from the vehicle. Two other passengers were injured. It was estimated that both cars reached speeds of more than 100 miles per hour (160 km/h). LeCroy's speedometer indicated she had been traveling at 83 miles per hour (134 km/h) when it broke during the crash. Carter had previously been cited for traffic violations three times during the fall semester, twice by campus authorities and once by Athens police for traveling at 89 miles per hour (143 km/h) in a 45 miles per hour (72 km/h) zone.

On March 1, 2023, an arrest warrant was issued for Carter for his involvement in the accident, with charges brought against him for reckless driving and street racing. That night, Carter turned himself in and was released on a $4,000 bond. He pleaded no contest to the charges on March 16, and was given 12 months of probation, along with a $1,000 fine, and ordered to complete 80 hours of community service and a driving course. On May 10, 2023, Dave Willock Sr., Devin Willock's father, filed a $40 million lawsuit, in which Carter was named a defendant. On July 13, 2023, Victoria Bowles, a former Georgia staffer who survived the car wreck, filed a lawsuit against Carter and the Georgia athletic association.
