= 2021 SEC Championship Game =

- Conference Championship
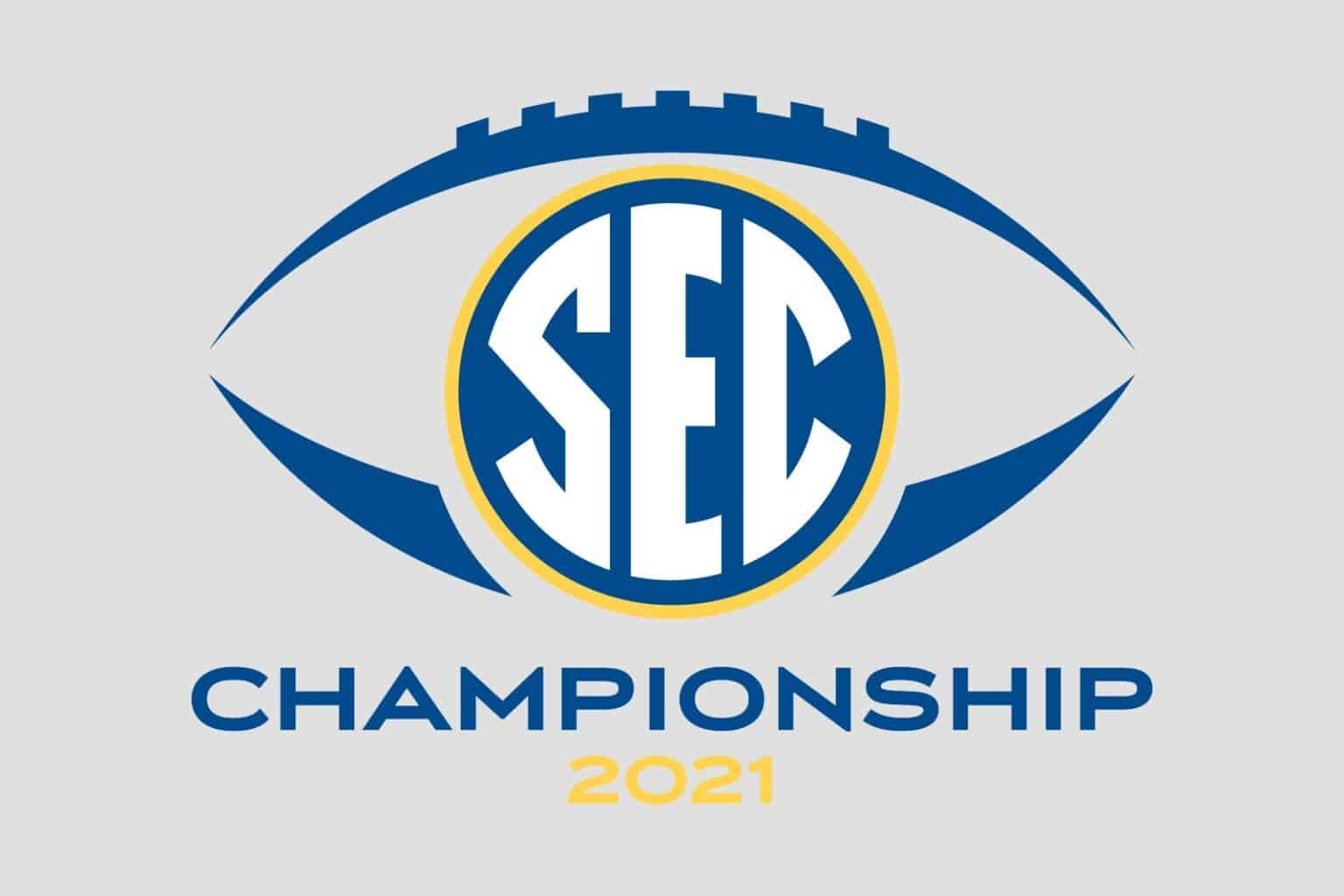
Georgia Bulldogs	Alabama Crimson Tide
(12–0)	(11–1)
24	41
Head coach: Kirby Smart	Head coach: Nick Saban
AP / Coaches / CFP; 1 / 1 / 1	AP / Coaches / CFP; 4 / 2 / 3
	1	2	3	4	Total
Georgia	3	14	0	7	24
Alabama	0	24	7	10	41
- Date: December 4, 2021
- Season: 2021
- Stadium: Mercedes-Benz Stadium
- Location: Atlanta, Georgia
- MVP: Bryce Young, QB, Alabama
- Favorite: Georgia by 6.5
- Referee: Ken Williamson
- Attendance: 78,030

United States TV coverage
- Network: CBS, Westwood One, SEC Radio
- Announcers: Brad Nessler, Gary Danielson, and Jamie Erdahl (CBS); Mike Watts, Derek Rackley and Olivia Harlan (Westwood One); Dave Neal, David Archer and Stephen Hartzell (SEC Radio)

2021 Southeastern Conference football standings
	Conf.			Overall
Team	W		L	W		L
Eastern Division
No. 1 Georgia x#^	8	–	0	14	–	1
No. 18 Kentucky*	5	–	3	10	–	3
Tennessee	4	–	4	7	–	6
Missouri	3	–	5	6	–	7
South Carolina	3	–	5	7	–	6
Florida	2	–	6	6	–	7
Vanderbilt	0	–	8	2	–	10
Western Division
No. 2 Alabama x$^	7	–	1	13	–	2
No. 11 Ole Miss	6	–	2	10	–	3
No. 21 Arkansas	4	–	4	9	–	4
Mississippi State	4	–	4	7	–	6
Texas A&M	4	–	4	8	–	4
Auburn	3	–	5	6	–	7
LSU	3	–	5	6	–	7
Championship: Alabama 41, Georgia 24
# – College Football Playoff champion; ^ – College Football Playoff participant; $ – Conference champion; x – Division champion/co-champions; * – Kentucky vacated all wins due to NCAA violations.; Rankings from AP Poll

The 2021 SEC Championship Game was a college football game that was played on December 4, 2021, at Mercedes-Benz Stadium in Atlanta. It was the 30th edition of the SEC Championship Game and determined the champion of the Southeastern Conference (SEC) for the 2021 season. The game began at 4:00 p.m. EST and was aired on CBS. The contest featured the Georgia Bulldogs, the East Division champions, and the Alabama Crimson Tide, the West Division champions.

== Teams ==
The 2021 SEC Championship Game featured the Georgia Bulldogs, champions of the East Division, and the Alabama Crimson Tide, champions of the West Division. It was the teams' 71st meeting, with Alabama leading the series 41–25–4; they first met in 1895 and played frequently from 1901 to the mid-1970s. Alabama has won the last six meetings between the teams, with Georgia's last victory over the Tide coming in 2007. This was the third time Georgia and Alabama have played for an SEC Championship; the Crimson Tide won each of the previous two meetings, in 2012 and 2018. Alabama entered the game holding a 3–0 postseason advantage over Georgia, having won the 2018 College Football Playoff National Championship in addition to the two aforementioned SEC Championship Games.

This was the ninth SEC title game appearance for Georgia; they first appeared in 2002 and were 3–5 overall in previous appearances, though the Bulldogs have won 13 SEC championships in total, dating back to 1942. Alabama made their 14th SEC championship game appearance, dating back to the inaugural game in 1992; the Crimson Tide entered the game 9–4 in SEC title games in that stretch. Including titles earned before the championship game format, Alabama leads the conference with 28 in total, dating back to 1933. Georgia and Alabama have appeared frequently in recent SEC Championship Games; entering the game, nine of the last ten title games featured at least one of the two teams, with Georgia's last appearance being in 2019, and Alabama returning consecutively after winning the previous year.

=== Georgia ===
Led by sixth-year head coach Kirby Smart, the fifth-ranked Bulldogs began their season with a matchup against No. 3 Clemson in the Duke's Mayo Classic. The game, which hosted College GameDay earlier that morning, played out to a low-scoring 10–3 Georgia win, putting them in the No. 2 spot in the rankings just one week into the season. The Bulldogs put on a dominant performance in their home opener the next week, as they scored eight touchdowns and allowed just one in a victory over UAB, and soundly defeated South Carolina the following week to open SEC play. Back-to-back shutouts followed, as the Bulldogs kept both Vanderbilt and No. 8 Arkansas off the scoreboard, while scoring 62 and 37 points of their own, respectively. Georgia continued their form with two more wins against ranked opponents, as they defeated No. 18 Auburn on the road and No. 11 Kentucky at home; the former game saw Georgia play as the No. 1 team in the nation for the first time this season following Texas A&M's upset of then-No. 1 Alabama, and the latter game was the first in which Georgia allowed more than one touchdown. The Bulldogs returned to neutral site play when they faced Florida following a bye week; they defeated the Gators 34–7, with their three touchdowns in just over three minutes at the end of the game's second quarter contributing to the win. This was also the week that Georgia clinched the SEC East's berth in the championship game, as a result of Kentucky's loss to Mississippi State. The Bulldogs finished their conference season in much the same style as the games before; they defeated Missouri 43–6, and allowed a season-high 17 points to Tennessee, though still managed to win by three possessions. Georgia finished the regular season with a pair of non-conference games, as they routed the Charleston Southern Buccaneers by seven scores and their rivals Georgia Tech by the same number, concluding Georgia's first undefeated regular season since 1982.

=== Alabama ===
Like Georgia, 15th-year head coach Nick Saban and the top-ranked Crimson Tide opened their season with a neutral site kickoff game, as they faced No. 14 Miami (FL) in the Chick-fil-A Kickoff Game. The game ended with an Alabama victory, as the Tide won convincingly to earn a 1–0 start to their national title defense. They opened their home season with a win against FCS Mercer, and followed it with their first SEC contest at No. 11 Florida, which saw Alabama escape an upset bid with a two-point win against the Gators. Alabama would rout Southern Miss the following week, in a game that featured Jameson Williams record three touchdowns of 80 yards or more, before defeating No. 12 Ole Miss by three touchdowns at home to extend their streak to six consecutive wins in that rivalry series. The Tide suffered their first and only regular season setback the following week, when they were upset by Texas A&M in College Station thanks to Seth Small's 28-yard field goal as time expired, which gave the Aggies a three-point victory. This loss snapped a 19-game winning streak for the Tide and dropped Alabama to No. 5 in the AP Poll, though they were able to rebound with impressive wins over Mississippi State and Tennessee to put their record at 7–1 entering their bye week. To begin the month of November, the Crimson Tide hosted LSU, whom they defeated by six points; Alabama then defeated New Mexico State, their final non-conference opponent, by a score of 59–3. The Tide's final home game came against No. 21 Arkansas; Alabama won by only a touchdown despite quarterback Bryce Young's school-record 559 passing yards, and the Tide dropped to No. 3 in the College Football Playoff rankings. With the win, Alabama clinched the SEC West Division title and their spot in the SEC Championship Game. The Crimson Tide concluded their regular season a week later with an Iron Bowl matchup against Auburn; the game went to four overtimes before Alabama came away with a two-point victory; this was the first game in Iron Bowl history to reach overtime.

== Game summary ==
2021 SEC Championship Game

Quarter	1	2	3	4	Total
No. 1 Georgia	3	14	0	7	24
No. 3 Alabama	0	24	7	10	41

at Mercedes-Benz Stadium • Atlanta, Georgia

- Date: December 4, 2021
- Game time: 4:11 p.m. EST
- Game weather: n/a (game played indoors)
- Game attendance: 78,030
- Referee: Ken Williamson
- TV announcers (CBS): Brad Nessler (play-by-play), Gary Danielson (analyst), Jamie Erdahl (sideline)
- Box score

Game information

First quarter

- 6:01 Georgia – Jack Podlesny 38 yd FG – 11 plays, 52 yards, 6:28 (Georgia 3–0)

Second quarter

- 14:56 Georgia – Stetson Bennett pass to Darnell Washington for 5 yds (Jack Podlesny KICK) – 8 plays, 97 yards, 3:36 (Georgia 10–0)
- 14:12 Alabama – Bryce Young pass to Jameson Williams for 67 yds (Will Reichard KICK) – 3 plays, 75 yards, 0:44 (Georgia 10–7)
- 9:46 Alabama – Bryce Young pass to John Metchie III for 13 yds (Will Reichard KICK) – 6 plays, 80 yards, 2:57 (Alabama 14–10)
- 3:28 Alabama – Will Reichard 33 yd FG – 12 plays, 79 yards, 5:13 (Alabama 17–10)
- 2:06 Georgia – Stetson Bennett pass to Ladd McConkey for 32 yds (Jack Podlesny KICK) – 3 plays, 75 yards, 1:22 (Tied 17–17)
- 0:26 Alabama – Bryce Young 11 yd rush (Will Reichard KICK) – 9 plays, 75 yards, 1:40 (Alabama 24–17)

Third quarter

- 13:10 Alabama – Bryce Young pass to Jameson Williams for 55 yds (Will Reichard KICK) – 5 plays, 75 yards, 1:50 (Alabama 31–17)

Fourth quarter

- 11:59 Alabama – Jordan Battle interception return 42 yards for a touchdown (Will Reichard KICK) (Alabama 38–17)
- 9:42 Georgia – Stetson Bennett pass to Brock Bowers for 18 yds (Jack Podlesny KICK) – 7 plays, 75 yards, 2:17 (Alabama 38–24)
- 1:59 Alabama – Will Reichard 41 yd FG – 12 plays, 62 yards, 5:09 (Alabama 41–24)

== Statistics ==
=== Team statistics ===
Team statistical comparison
Statistic	Georgia	Alabama
First downs	30	25
First downs rushing	10	8
First downs passing	15	15
First downs penalty	5	2
Third down efficiency	3–12	7–14
Fourth down efficiency	2–4	0–0
Total plays–net yards	78–449	70–536
Rushing attempts–net yards	30–109	26–115
Yards per rush	3.6	4.4
Yards passing	340	421
Pass completions–attempts	29–48	26–44
Interceptions thrown	2	0
Punt returns–total yards	2–6	0–0
Kickoff returns–total yards	2–45	0–0
Punts–total yardage	4–210	5–219
Fumbles–lost	0–0	0–0
Penalties–yards	6–45	7–85
Time of possession	34:13	25:47

=== Individual statistics ===
Georgia statistics
Bulldogs passing
	C–A	Yds	TD	INT
Stetson Bennett	29–48	340	3	2
Bulldogs rushing
	Car	Yds	TD	Avg
James Cook	11	38	0	3.5
Bulldogs receiving
	Rec	Yds	TD	Avg
Brock Bowers	10	139	1	13.9

Alabama statistics
Crimson Tide passing
	C–A	Yds	TD	INT
Bryce Young	26–44	421	3	0
Crimson Tide rushing
	Car	Yds	TD	Avg
Brian Robinson	16	55	0	3.4
Crimson Tide receiving
	Rec	Yds	TD	Avg
Jameson Williams	7	184	2	26.3

== See also ==
- 2022 College Football Playoff National Championship
