= Josh Paschal =

American football player (born 1999)

Profile
- Position: Defensive end

Personal information
- Born: December 17, 1999 (age 26); Washington, D.C., U.S.
- Listed height: 6 ft 3 in (1.91 m)
- Listed weight: 275 lb (125 kg)

Career information
- High school: Our Lady of Good Counsel (Olney, Maryland)
- College: Kentucky (2017–2021)
- NFL draft: 2022: 2nd round, 46th overall pick

Career history
- Detroit Lions (2022–2025)

Awards and highlights
- First-team All-SEC (2021); Second-team All-American (2021)

Career NFL statistics as of 2025
- Total tackles: 62
- Sacks: 5
- Fumble recoveries: 2
- Pass deflections: 1
- Stats at Pro Football Reference

Joshua Paschal (born December 17, 1999) is an American professional football defensive end. He played college football for the Kentucky Wildcats and was selected by the Detroit Lions in the second round of the 2022 NFL draft.

== Early life ==
Paschal was born in Washington, D.C., and grew up in Prince George's County, Maryland. He attended Our Lady of Good Counsel High School, where he played football and basketball. As a senior, Paschal had 64 tackles, nine tackles for loss, and 5.5 sacks. Paschal was rated a four-star recruit and committed to play college football at Kentucky Wildcats over offers from Maryland, Oklahoma, Notre Dame, Clemson, Ohio State, and USC.

== College career ==
Paschal played in all 13 of Kentucky's games as a freshman and finished the season with 17 tackles, 4.5 tackles for loss, and 3.5 sacks. Before the start of preseason training camp he was diagnosed with melanoma on his left foot. Paschal used a medical redshirt while undergoing treatment, but was able to return for the final three games of Kentucky's season. He recorded 34 tackles, 9.5 tackles for loss, 3.5 sacks, and two forced fumbles in his redshirt sophomore season. Paschal finished his redshirt junior season with 32 tackles, 6.5 tackles for loss, one sack, and one interception. Paschal was named first-team All-Southeastern Conference by the Associated Press as redshirt senior after recording 52 tackles and five sacks.

== Professional career ==
Pre-draft measurables
Height	Weight	Arm length	Hand span	Wingspan	40-yard dash	10-yard split	20-yard split	Vertical jump	Broad jump	Bench press
6 ft 2 5/8 in (1.90 m)	268 lb (122 kg)	32 3/4 in (0.83 m)	9 5/8 in (0.24 m)	6 ft 7 in (2.01 m)	4.77 s	1.57 s	2.71 s	37.5 in (0.95 m)	10 ft 3 in (3.12 m)	30 reps
All values from NFL Combine/Pro Day

Paschal was selected by the Detroit Lions in the second round, 46th overall, in the 2022 NFL draft. He was placed on the reserve/physically unable to perform list to start the season on August 23, 2022. Paschal was activated on October 22.

On September 16, 2023, Paschal was placed on injured reserve. He was activated on October 21.

Prior to the 2025 season, Paschal underwent back surgery to address a disc issue that had plagued him during the 2024 campaign; the malady caused him to begin the season on the NFI List. On November 26, 2025, the Lions elected not to activate Paschal within his return window, ruling him out for the remainder of the year.

On March 11, 2026, Paschal was waived by the Lions.

== Personal life ==
Paschal's older brother, TraVaughn, also played football at Kentucky.
