= M. J. Sherman =

American football player (born 2002)

Profile
- Position: Defensive lineman

Personal information
- Born: February 26, 2002 (age 24); Baltimore, Maryland, U.S.
- Listed height: 6 ft 3 in (1.91 m)
- Listed weight: 245 lb (111 kg)

Career information
- High school: St. John's (Washington, D.C.)
- College: Georgia (2020–2022); Nebraska (2023–2024)
- NFL draft: 2025: undrafted

Career history
- Montreal Alouettes (2025)

Awards and highlights
- 2× CFP national champion (2021, 2022)
- Stats at CFL.ca

Mekhail Jacaques Sherman (born February 26, 2002) is an American professional football defensive lineman. He previously played for the Montreal Alouettes of the Canadian Football League (CFL). He played college football at Georgia and Nebraska as a linebacker.

== Early life ==
Mekhail Jacaques Sherman was born on February 26, 2002, in Baltimore, Maryland. He grew up in a single-parent home in Baltimore with his mother and three siblings. His father Varney Sherman is a politician in Liberia. Mekhail is named after Mikhail Gorbachev.

Sherman played high school football at St. John's College High School in Washington, D.C. As a senior in 2019, he was one of five finalists for the high school Butkus Award, given to the best linebacker in the country. Sherman was selected to play in the 2020 Under Armour All-America Game.

== College career ==
Sherman first played college football for the Georgia Bulldogs of the University of Georgia. He played in nine of ten games during the COVID-19 shortened 2020 season and posted two solo tackles. He played in all 15 games as a backup linebacker and special teams player in 2021, recording one solo tackle, and six assisted tackles, as Georgia won the national championship. Sherman appeared in all 15 games for the second straight year in 2022, totaling four solo tackles, one assisted tackle, and 0.5 sacks, as Georgia won the national championship for the second consecutive season. Sherman majored in exercise and sport science at Georgia.

In January 2023, Sherman transferred to play for the Nebraska Cornhuskers of the University of Nebraska–Lincoln. He played in 12 games, starting five, during the 2023 season, recording seven solo tackles, nine assisted tackles, and 1.5 sacks. He appeared in all 13 games, starting 12, as a senior in 2024, posting 15 solo tackles, 14 assisted tackles, and 3.5 sacks. Sherman majored in child, youth and family studies at Nebraska.

== Professional career ==
After going undrafted in the 2025 NFL draft, Sherman attended rookie minicamp on a tryout basis with the Denver Broncos. He then signed with the Montreal Alouettes of the Canadian Football League (CFL) on May 13, 2025, as a defensive lineman. He was moved to the practice roster on June 1 before the start of the 2025 CFL season. Sherman was promoted to the active roster on June 26, moved back to the practice roster on July 1, promoted to the active roster again on July 23, moved back to the practice roster again on July 31, promoted to the active roster for the third time on September 23, and demoted to the practice roster for the final time on October 11, 2025. He became a free agent after the 2025 season.
