= Nakobe Dean =

American football player (born 2000)

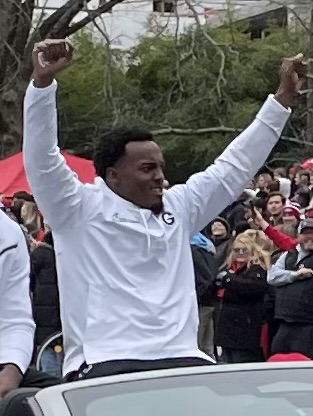
- Dean in 2022

No. 17 – Las Vegas Raiders
- Position: Linebacker
- Roster status: Active

Personal information
- Born: December 13, 2000 (age 25); Horn Lake, Mississippi, U.S.
- Listed height: 5 ft 11 in (1.80 m)
- Listed weight: 230 lb (104 kg)

Career information
- High school: Horn Lake
- College: Georgia (2019–2021)
- NFL draft: 2022: 3rd round, 83rd overall pick

Career history
- Philadelphia Eagles (2022–2025); Las Vegas Raiders (2026–present)

Awards and highlights
- Super Bowl champion (LIX); CFP national champion (2021); Butkus Award (2021); Unanimous All-American (2021)

Career NFL statistics as of Week 10, 2026
- Total tackles: 333
- Sacks: 9.0
- Forced fumbles: 6
- Fumble recoveries: 3
- Pass deflections: 7
- Interceptions: 2
- Stats at Pro Football Reference

Nakobe Rashod Dean (born December 13, 2000) is an American professional football linebacker for the Las Vegas Raiders of the National Football League (NFL). He played college football for the Georgia Bulldogs, winning the 2021 Butkus Award before being selected by the Philadelphia Eagles in the third round of the 2022 NFL draft.

== Early life ==
Dean played high school football at Horn Lake High School. As a senior, he won the High School Butkus Award. As a five-star recruit, Dean committed to Georgia after receiving offers from Ole Miss and Alabama.

== College career ==
As a true freshman for the Georgia Bulldogs football team, Dean recorded 25 total tackles despite battling injuries. In 2021, he won the Butkus Award given annually to college football's best linebacker and finished the season as a key member of the team that won the 2022 College Football Playoff National Championship. On January 15, 2022, Dean declared for the 2022 NFL draft.

== Professional career ==
Dean was invited to the 2022 NFL Scouting Combine. He performed limited positional drills due to an injury (a torn pectoral muscle) that he suffered while training for the NFL draft.

Pre-draft measurables
Height	Weight	Arm length	Hand span	Wingspan
5 ft 11 1/4 in (1.81 m)	229 lb (104 kg)	31 7/8 in (0.81 m)	9 1/8 in (0.23 m)	6 ft 4 1/8 in (1.93 m)
All values from NFL Combine

=== Philadelphia Eagles ===
Dean was selected in the third round (83rd overall) of the 2022 NFL Draft by the Philadelphia Eagles. His draft-day slide was considered surprising, but NFL analyst Ian Rapoport pointed out that teams were reportedly concerned about Dean's size, and his decision to opt against getting surgery to repair his pectoral injury. Dean appeared in all 17 games as a rookie and mainly played on special teams. Dean's rookie season ended with a trip to Super Bowl LVII where the Eagles lost 38–35 to the Kansas City Chiefs.

Dean entered the 2023 season as the Eagles starting middle linebacker. He suffered a foot injury in Week 1 and was placed on injured reserve on September 12, 2023. He was activated on October 14, but placed back on injured reserve on November 16 with a Lisfranc injury.

On November 3, 2024, during a Week 9 matchup against the Jacksonville Jaguars, Dean recorded his first career interception to effectively win the game, 28–23.

On January 12, 2025, Dean tore the patellar tendon in his left knee after tackling Tucker Kraft of the Green Bay Packers in the Wild Card playoff game. Dean was carted off the field and Oren Burks, who forced a fumble on the opening kickoff of the game, subbed in for him. Dean was subsequently placed on injured reserve and was confirmed to be out for the rest of the playoffs. As a result, the Eagles signed Nicholas Morrow to the practice squad on January 14, while Burks replaced Dean as a starter for the rest of the playoffs. Without Dean, the Eagles went on to win Super Bowl LIX, giving Dean his first Super Bowl ring.

On October 9, 2025, Dean was activated from the PUP list ahead of the team's Week 6 matchup against the New York Giants.

=== Las Vegas Raiders ===
On March 11, 2026, the Las Vegas Raiders signed Dean to a three-year, $36 million contract that included $23 million guaranteed and a signing bonus of $5.75 million.

== Career statistics ==
Legend
	Won the Super Bowl
**Bold**	Career high

=== NFL ===
Year	Team	Games		Tackles				Fumbles				Interceptions						
Year	Team	GP	GS	Cmb	Solo	Ast	Sck	FF	FR	Yds	TD	Int	Yds	Avg	Lng	TD	PD	
2022	PHI	17	0	13	9	4	0	0	0	0	0	0	0	0	0	0	0	
2023	PHI	5	4	30	22	8	0.5	0	0	0	0	0	0	0	0	0	0	
2024	PHI	15	15	**128**	**80**	**48**	3.0	1	**2**	0	0	**1**	0	0	0	0	**4**	
2025	PHI	10	8	55	30	25	**4.0**	**2**	0	0	0	0	0	0	0	0	1	
2026	LVR	10	10	107	50	57	1.5	3	1	0	0	0	1	0	0	0	0	2
Career		57	37	333	191	142	9.0	6	3	0	0	2	0	0	0	0	7	

=== College ===
Season	GP	Tackles				Sacks		Interceptions			Fumbles			Scoring
Season	GP	Solo	Ast	Cmb	TfL	Sck	Yds	Int	Yds	PD	FR	Yds	FF	TD
2019	14	14	11	25	1.5	0	0	0	0	2	0	0	1	0
2020	10	**39**	32	71	1.5	1.5	9	0	0	0	0	0	0	0
2021	15	36	**36**	**72**	**10.5**	**6**	**47**	**2**	**50**	**6**	0	0	**2**	**1**
Career	39	89	79	168	14.5	7.5	56	2	50	8	0	0	3	1

== Personal life ==
Dean is a member of Omega Psi Phi fraternity and was initiated while at Georgia. Dean's older brother, Nikolas, played tight end at Ole Miss. In 2022, Dean was named the Arthur Ashe Jr. Male Sports Scholar of the Year by Diverse: Issues In Higher Education.
