= 2021 All-America college football team =

Official list of the best college football players of 2021

The 2021 All-America college football team includes those players of American college football who have been honored by various selector organizations as the best players at their respective positions. The selector organizations award the "All-America" honor annually following the conclusion of the fall college football season. The original All-America team was the 1889 All-America college football team selected by Caspar Whitney. The National Collegiate Athletic Bureau, which is the National Collegiate Athletic Association's (NCAA) service bureau, compiled, in the 1950, the first list of All-Americans including first-team selections on teams created for a national audience that received national circulation with the intent of recognizing selections made from viewpoints that were nationwide. Since 1957, College Sports Information Directors of America (CoSIDA) has bestowed Academic All-American recognition on male and female athletes in Divisions I, II, and III of the NCAA as well as National Association of Intercollegiate Athletics athletes, including all NCAA championship sports.

The 2021 College Football All-America Team is composed of the following College Football All-American first teams chosen by the following selector organizations: Associated Press (AP), Football Writers Association of America (FWAA), American Football Coaches Association (AFCA), Walter Camp Foundation (WCFF), Sporting News (TSN, from its historic name of The Sporting News), Sports Illustrated (SI), The Athletic (Athletic), USA Today (USAT), ESPN, CBS Sports (CBS), College Football News (CFN), Scout.com, Athlon Sports, Phil Steele, and Fox Sports (FOX).

Currently, the NCAA compiles consensus all-America teams in the sports of Division I FBS football and Division I men's basketball using a point system computed from All-America teams named by coaches associations or media sources. Players are chosen against other players playing at their position only. To be selected a consensus All-American, players must be chosen to the first team on at least half of the five official selectors as recognized by the NCAA. Second- and third-team honors are used to break ties. Players named first-team by all five selectors are deemed unanimous All-Americans. Currently, the NCAA recognizes All-Americans selected by the AP, AFCA, FWAA, TSN, and the WCFF to determine consensus and unanimous All-Americans.

Twenty-seven players were recognized as consensus All-Americans for 2021, ten of them unanimously. Unanimous selections are followed by an asterisk (*).

2021 Consensus All-Americans
Name	Position	Year	University
Bryce Young	Quarterback	Sophomore	Alabama
Breece Hall	Running back	Junior	Iowa State
Kenneth Walker III*	Running back	Junior	Michigan State
Jordan Addison	Wide receiver	Sophomore	Pittsburgh
David Bell	Wide receiver	Junior	Purdue
Trey McBride*	Tight end	Senior	Colorado State
Ikem Ekwonu*	Offensive line	Sophomore	NC State
Darian Kinnard	Offensive line	Senior	Kentucky
Kenyon Green	Offensive line	Junior	Texas A&M
Evan Neal	Offensive line	Junior	Alabama
Tyler Linderbaum*	Center	Junior	Iowa
Jordan Davis*	Defensive line	Senior	Georgia
Aidan Hutchinson*	Defensive line	Senior	Michigan
DeMarvin Leal	Defensive line	Junior	Texas A&M
Kayvon Thibodeaux*	Defensive line	Junior	Oregon
Will Anderson Jr.*	Linebacker	Sophomore	Alabama
Nakobe Dean*	Linebacker	Junior	Georgia
Devin Lloyd	Linebacker	Senior	Utah
Sauce Gardner	Defensive back	Junior	Cincinnati
Kyle Hamilton	Defensive back	Junior	Notre Dame
Verone McKinley III	Defensive back	Sophomore	Oregon
Jalen Pitre	Defensive back	Senior	Baylor
Jake Moody	Kicker	Senior	Michigan
Matt Araiza*	Punter	Junior	San Diego State
Marcus Jones	All-purpose/Return specialist	Senior	Houston
Deuce Vaughn	All-purpose/Return specialist	Sophomore	Kansas State

== Offense ==
=== Quarterback ===
- Bryce Young, Alabama (AP, CBS, ESPN, FWAA, The Athletic, TSN, USAT)
- Kenny Pickett, Pittsburgh (AFCA, WCFF)

=== Running back ===
- Breece Hall, Iowa State (AFCA, AP, CBS, The Athletic, USAT, TSN, WCFF)
- Sean Tucker, Syracuse (ESPN, FWAA)
- Kenneth Walker III, Michigan State (AFCA, AP, CBS, ESPN, FWAA, The Athletic, TSN, USAT, WCFF)

=== Wide receiver ===
- Jordan Addison, Pittsburgh (AP, ESPN, FWAA, TSN, USAT, WCFF)
- David Bell, Purdue (AFCA, AP, CBS, ESPN, FWAA, WCFF)
- Chris Olave, Ohio State (AFCA)
- Jameson Williams, Alabama (AP, CBS, The Athletic, TSN, USAT)
- Garrett Wilson, Ohio State (FWAA, The Athletic)

=== Tight end ===
- Brock Bowers, Georgia (CBS, ESPN, The Athletic, USAT)
- Trey McBride, Colorado State (AFCA, AP, FWAA, TSN, WCFF)

=== Offensive line ===
- Charles Cross, Mississippi State (ESPN, TSN)
- Connor Galvin, Baylor (The Athletic)
- Kenyon Green, Texas A&M (AP, ESPN, The Athletic, TSN, USAT)
- Zion Johnson, Boston College (AP, ESPN, USAT, WCFF)
- Darian Kinnard, Kentucky (AFCA, AP, CBS, FWAA, WCFF)
- Thayer Munford, Ohio State (AFCA)
- Evan Neal, Alabama (AFCA, CBS, ESPN, FWAA, The Athletic, TSN, USAT, WCFF)
- Ikem Ekwonu, NC State (AFCA, AP, CBS, FWAA, The Athletic, TSN, USAT, WCFF)
- Nicholas Petit-Frere, Ohio State (CBS, FWAA)

=== Center ===
- Tyler Linderbaum, Iowa (AFCA, AP, CBS, ESPN, FWAA, The Athletic, USAT, TSN, WCFF)

== Defense ==
=== Defensive line ===
- Jordan Davis, Georgia (AFCA, AP, CBS, ESPN, FWAA, The Athletic, TSN, USAT, WCFF)
- Aidan Hutchinson, Michigan (AFCA, AP, CBS, ESPN, FWAA, The Athletic, TSN, USAT, WCFF)
- Jermaine Johnson II, Florida State (CBS, ESPN, USAT, WCFF)
- George Karlaftis, Purdue (AFCA)
- DeMarvin Leal, Texas A&M (AP, CBS, TSN, USAT)
- Will McDonald IV, Iowa State (FWAA)
- Kayvon Thibodeaux, Oregon (AFCA, AP, FWAA, The Athletic, TSN, WCFF)
- Cameron Thomas, San Diego State (ESPN, The Athletic)

=== Linebacker ===
- Will Anderson Jr., Alabama (AFCA, AP, CBS, ESPN, FWAA, The Athletic, TSN, USAT, WCFF)
- Leo Chenal, Wisconsin (AFCA)
- Nakobe Dean, Georgia (AFCA, AP, CBS, ESPN, FWAA, The Athletic, TSN, USAT, WCFF)
- Devin Lloyd, Utah (AP, CBS, ESPN, FWAA, The Athletic, TSN, USAT, WCFF)
- Malcolm Rodriguez, Oklahoma State (ESPN)

=== Defensive back ===
- Jaquan Brisker, Penn State (CBS)
- Coby Bryant, Cincinnati (AFCA, WCFF)
- Lewis Cine, Georgia (TSN)
- Sauce Gardner, Cincinnati (AFCA, AP, CBS, ESPN, FWAA, The Athletic, TSN, USAT)
- Kyle Hamilton, Notre Dame (AFCA, FWAA, The Athletic, WCFF)
- Marcus Jones, Houston (AP)
- Steven Jones Jr., Appalachian State (FWAA)
- Roger McCreary, Auburn (AP, ESPN, The Athletic, USAT)
- Verone McKinley III, Oregon (AP, CBS, ESPN, TSN, USAT, WCFF)
- Riley Moss, Iowa (CBS, TSN)
- Jalen Pitre, Baylor (AFCA, AP, ESPN, FWAA, The Athletic, USAT, WCFF)

== Special teams ==
=== Kicker ===
- Harrison Mevis, Missouri (The Athletic, TSN)
- Jake Moody, Michigan (AFCA, AP, CBS, WCFF)
- Nate Needham, Bowling Green (FWAA)
- Noah Ruggles, Ohio State (ESPN)
- Caleb Shudak, Iowa (USAT)

=== Punter ===
- Matt Araiza, San Diego State (AFCA, AP, CBS, ESPN, FWAA, The Athletic, TSN, USAT, WCFF)

=== Long snapper ===
- Cal Adomitis, Pittsburgh (AFCA)

=== All-purpose / return specialist ===
- Brian Battie, South Florida (FWAA, WCFF)
- Britain Covey, Utah (CBS)
- Marcus Jones, Houston (CBS, ESPN, FWAA, The Athletic, TSN, USAT)
- Zonovan Knight, NC State (CBS)
- Jayden Reed, Michigan State (AFCA)
- Deuce Vaughn, Kansas State (AP, TSN)
- Jameson Williams, Alabama (ESPN)
