= Channing Tindall =

American football player (born 2000)

Profile
- Position: Linebacker

Personal information
- Born: March 28, 2000 (age 26); Columbia, South Carolina, U.S.
- Listed height: 6 ft 2 in (1.88 m)
- Listed weight: 236 lb (107 kg)

Career information
- High school: Spring Valley (Columbia, South Carolina)
- College: Georgia (2018–2021)
- NFL draft: 2022: 3rd round, 102nd overall pick

Career history
- Miami Dolphins (2022–2024); Arizona Cardinals (2025); Atlanta Falcons (2026)*
- * Offseason or practice squad member only

Awards and highlights
- CFP national champion (2021); Second-team All-SEC (2021)

Career NFL statistics as of 2025
- Total tackles: 24
- Stats at Pro Football Reference

Channing D. Tindall (born March 28, 2000) is an American professional football linebacker. He played college football for the Georgia Bulldogs.

== Early life ==
Tindall attended Spring Valley High School in Columbia, South Carolina. He played in the 2018 U.S. Army All-American Bowl. He committed to the University of Georgia to play college football.

== College career ==
As a true freshman at Georgia in 2018, Tindall played in 14 games and had 17 tackles and 2.5 sacks. As a sophomore in 2019, he played in 11 games and had nine tackles and 1.5 sacks. He played in 10 games his junior year in 2020, recording 15 tackles and three sacks. Tindall returned to Georgia for his senior year in 2021.

== Professional career ==
Pre-draft measurables
Height	Weight	Arm length	Hand span	Wingspan	40-yard dash	10-yard split	20-yard split	20-yard shuttle	Three-cone drill	Vertical jump	Broad jump
6 ft 1 7/8 in (1.88 m)	230 lb (104 kg)	32 7/8 in (0.84 m)	10 5/8 in (0.27 m)	6 ft 5 1/8 in (1.96 m)	4.47 s	1.55 s	2.58 s	4.18 s	7.25 s	42.0 in (1.07 m)	10 ft 9 in (3.28 m)
All values from NFL Combine/Pro Day

=== Miami Dolphins ===
Tindall was selected by the Miami Dolphins in the third round, 102nd overall, of the 2022 NFL draft. As a rookie, Tindall appeared in 16 games in the 2022 season. In the 2023 season, Tindall appeared in all 17 games. In the 2024 season, Tindall appeared in 11 games.

On August 26, 2025, Tindall was waived by the Dolphins as part of final roster cuts.

=== Arizona Cardinals ===
On September 10, 2025, Tindall signed with the Arizona Cardinals' practice squad. He was promoted to the active roster on December 6.

=== Atlanta Falcons ===
On March 14, 2026, Tindall signed with the Atlanta Falcons. He was released by the Falcons on August 29.
