= Lewis Cine =

Haitian gridiron football player (born 1999)

Profile
- Position: Safety

Personal information
- Born: 5 October 1999 (age 27); Port-au-Prince, Haiti
- Listed height: 6 ft 2 in (1.88 m)
- Listed weight: 199 lb (90 kg)

Career information
- High school: Trinity Christian (Cedar Hill, Texas, U.S.)
- College: Georgia (2019–2021)
- NFL draft: 2022: 1st round, 32nd overall pick

Career history
- Minnesota Vikings (2022–2023); Buffalo Bills (2024); Philadelphia Eagles (2024–2025)

Awards and highlights
- Super Bowl champion (LIX); CFP national champion (2021); CFP National Championship Game Defensive MVP (2022); First-team All-SEC (2021)

Career NFL statistics
- Total tackles: 1
- Stats at Pro Football Reference

Lewis Tom Cine (/siːn/ SEEN; born 5 October 1999) is a Haitian-American professional football safety. He played college football for the Georgia Bulldogs and was selected by the Minnesota Vikings in the first round of the 2022 NFL draft. He has also been a member of the Buffalo Bills and Philadelphia Eagles.

== Early life ==
Cine was born on 5 October 1999, in Haiti and immigrated to the United States at age four, originally settling with his family in Florida before moving to Everett, Massachusetts. He initially attended Everett High School. As a junior, he was named the Massachusetts Defensive Player of the Year by USA Today after recording 65 tackles, two sacks, two interceptions, two fumble recoveries, and a blocked kick as Everett won a second straight MIAA state championship. After the retirement of Everett's coach at the end of the season, Cine moved to Cedar Hill, Texas, to live with an uncle and enrolled at Trinity Christian School for his senior year. While at Cedar Hill, he was coached by Hall of Fame cornerback Deion Sanders. Cine committed to play college football for the Georgia Bulldogs over offers from Texas, Michigan, Penn State, and Florida.

== College career ==
Cine played in all 14 of Georgia's games during his freshman season and started the final two. He was named a starting safety for the Bulldogs going into his sophomore season. Cine finished the season with 49 tackles and 12 passes broken up over ten starts and was ejected from the team's game against Florida after drawing a targeting penalty. On 15 January 2022, Cine declared for the 2022 NFL draft.

== Professional career ==
Pre-draft measurables
Height	Weight	Arm length	Hand span	Wingspan	40-yard dash	10-yard split	20-yard split	Vertical jump	Broad jump
6 ft 2 1/4 in (1.89 m)	199 lb (90 kg)	32 1/4 in (0.82 m)	9 3/8 in (0.24 m)	6 ft 6 in (1.98 m)	4.37 s	1.45 s	2.48 s	37.0 in (0.94 m)	11 ft 1 in (3.38 m)
All values from NFL Combine/Pro Day

=== Minnesota Vikings ===
Cine was selected in the first round with the 32nd overall pick by the Minnesota Vikings in the 2022 NFL draft. In Week 4 against the New Orleans Saints, Cine suffered a compound fracture injury to his lower left leg during a punt coverage play, which required two surgeries, ending his rookie season.

On August 27, 2024, Cine was released by the Vikings and became a free agent.

=== Buffalo Bills ===
On August 29, 2024, Cine was signed to the Buffalo Bills practice squad.

=== Philadelphia Eagles ===
On January 8, 2025, Cine was signed by the Philadelphia Eagles off the Bills practice squad. He won a Super Bowl championship when the Eagles defeated the Kansas City Chiefs 40–22 in Super Bowl LIX. Cine was waived/injured on August 24.

=== DC Defenders ===
On January 14, 2026, Cine was selected by the DC Defenders of the United Football League (UFL).

== Personal life ==
Cine wore jersey #16 at the University of Georgia to honor his mother, who was 16 years old when he was born. Cine has a daughter named Bella, born in 2017.
