= Todd Hartley =

American football coach (born 1985)

Current position
- Title: Tight ends coach
- Team: Georgia
- Conference: SEC

Biographical details
- Born: September 9, 1985 (age 41); Gray, Georgia, U.S.
- Education: Georgia

Coaching career (HC unless noted)
- 2008: West Virginia (GA)
- 2009–2010: Georgia (GA)
- 2011–2012: Marshall (S)
- 2013–2014: Marshall (TE)
- 2016–2018: Miami (ST/TE)
- 2019–2022: Georgia (TE)
- 2023–present: Georgia (AHC/TE)

Accomplishments and honors

Championships
- 2 National (2021) (2022)

Todd Hartley (born September 9, 1985) is an American football coach who currently serves as the tight ends coach for the Georgia Bulldogs. Hartley was previously the tight ends coach and the special teams coordinator for Miami.

== Early life and education ==
Todd Hartley was born on September 9, 1985, and is a native of Gray, Georgia. Hartley attended Jones County High School in Gray, Georgia. After completing high school, Hartley attended the University of Georgia, where he graduated in 2008 with a bachelor's degree in Health and Physical Education.

== Coaching career ==
Following his graduation from Georgia, Hartley became a student assistant for Georgia for three years, and would later accept a position as a graduate assistant from West Virginia, and then Georgia again. In 2011, Hartley became a position coach for the first time, becoming the tight ends coach for Marshall. Two years later, Hartley would switch from tight ends coach to safeties coach and also become recruiting coordinator for Marshall. After spending 2015 as the director for player personnel at Georgia, Hartley became the special teams coordinator and tight ends coach for Miami. In 2019, Hartley once again rejoined Georgia, becoming the tight ends coach there and winning national championship's as a coach in 2021 and 2022. He was promoted to serve Assistant Head Coach responsibilities in 2023.
