= 2021–22 College Football Playoff =

College football tournament

- Season: 2021
- Dates: December 31, 2021 – January 10, 2022
- Teams invited: (1) Alabama; (2) Michigan; (3) Georgia; (4) Cincinnati
- Venues: AT&T Stadium; Hard Rock Stadium; Lucas Oil Stadium
- Champions: Georgia (1st CFP title, 3rd overall title)

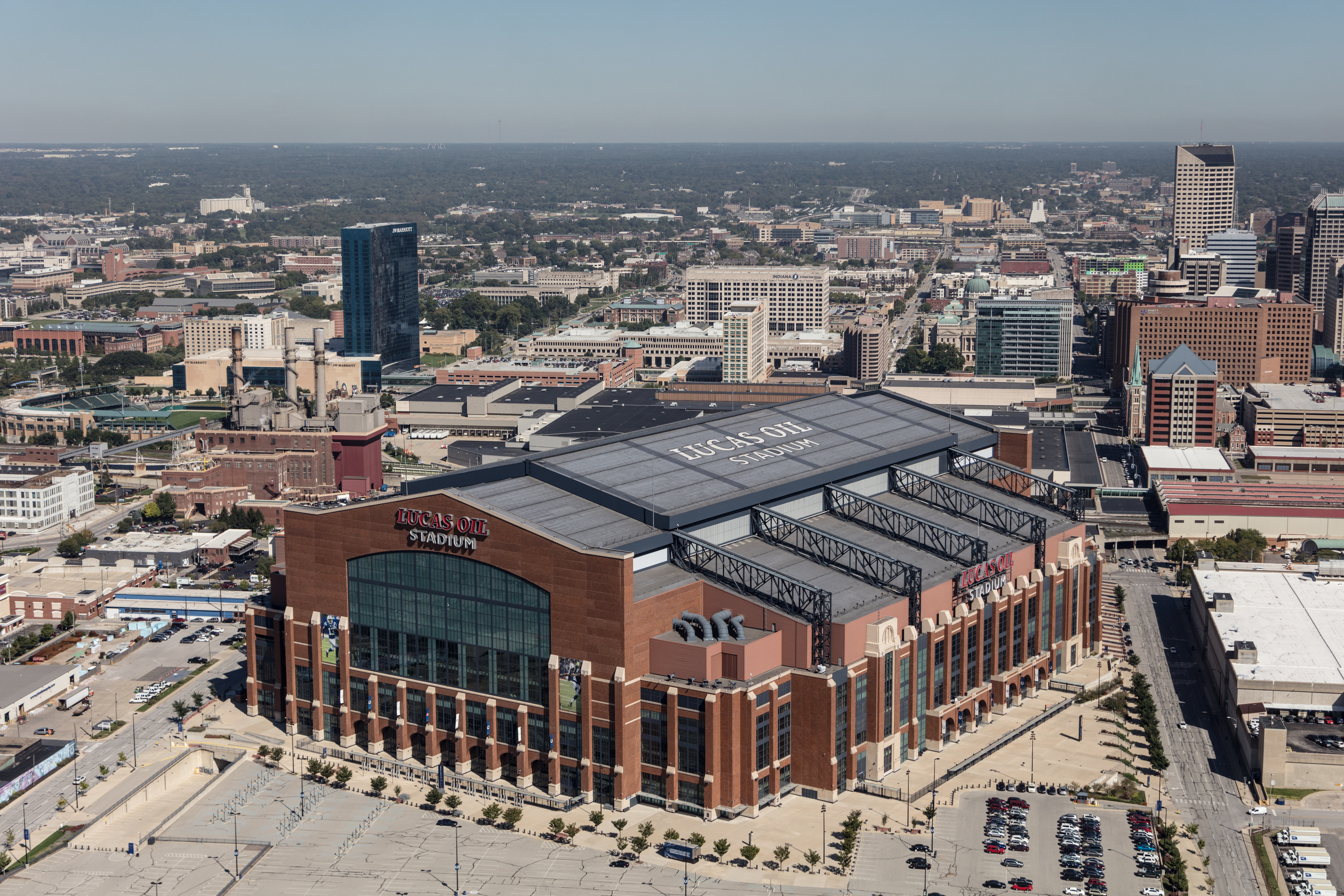
Lucas Oil Stadium in Indianapolis, Indiana, hosted the College Football Playoff National Championship.

The 2021–22 College Football Playoff was a single-elimination postseason tournament that determined the national champion of the 2021 NCAA Division I FBS football season. It was the eighth edition of the College Football Playoff (CFP) and involved the top four teams in the country as ranked by the College Football Playoff poll playing in two semifinals, with the winners of each advancing to the national championship game. The four teams selected to participate in the playoff were No. 1 Alabama from the Southeastern Conference, No. 2 Michigan from the Big Ten Conference, No. 3 Georgia from the Southeastern Conference, and No. 4 Cincinnati from the American Athletic Conference. Georgia was the lone team of the four to not have been champions of their conference, as they lost the SEC Championship to Alabama. Cincinnati's selection made them the first team from any of the Group of Five conferences to appear in the College Football Playoff.

The playoff bracket's semifinal games were held at the Cotton Bowl Classic and the Orange Bowl on New Year's Eve, part of the season's slate of bowl games. The Cotton Bowl semifinal saw Alabama defeat Cincinnati by a twenty-one-point margin, while the Orange Bowl semifinal saw Georgia defeat Michigan, 34–11. By virtue of their victories, Alabama and Georgia advanced to the national championship game, held on January 10 in Indianapolis. The title game was a rematch of the 2018 College Football Playoff National Championship and the SEC Championship played roughly a month prior. In the championship game, Georgia upset Alabama, 33–18, to win their first CFP national championship and their third national championship in school history, the first since 1980.

== Bracket ==
Semifinals
December 31 – Cotton Bowl Classic AT&T Stadium, Arlington
1	Alabama	27
4	Cincinnati	6
December 31 – Orange Bowl Hard Rock Stadium, Miami Gardens
2	Michigan	11
3	Georgia	34

Championship
January 10 – National Championship Lucas Oil Stadium, Indianapolis
1	Alabama	18
3	Georgia	33

== Selection and teams ==
The 2021–22 CFP selection committee was chaired by Iowa athletic director Gary Barta. Its other members were Kentucky athletic director Mitch Barnhart, former The Arizona Republic reporter Paola Boivin, Wyoming athletic director Tom Burman, Georgia State athletic director Charlie Cobb, NC State athletic director Boo Corrigan, Colorado athletic director Rick George, former NFL player Will Shields, Kansas State athletic director Gene Taylor, former head coach Joe Taylor, mathematician and former NFL player John Urschel, former Sugar Bowl president Rod West, and former head coach Tyrone Willingham.

2021 College Football Playoff rankings top six progression
No.	Week 9	Week 10	Week 11	Week 12	Week 13	Final
1	Georgia (8–0)	Georgia (9–0)	Georgia (10–0)	Georgia (11–0)	Georgia (12–0)	Alabama (12–1)
2	Alabama (7–1)	Alabama (8–1)	Alabama (9–1)	Ohio State (10–1)	Michigan (11–1)	Michigan (12–1)
3	Michigan State (8–0)	Oregon (8–1)	Oregon (9–1)	Alabama (10–1)	Alabama (11–1)	Georgia (12–1)
4	Oregon (7–1)	Ohio State (8–1)	Ohio State (9–1)	Cincinnati (11–0)	Cincinnati (12–0)	Cincinnati (13–0)
5	Ohio State (7–1)	Cincinnati (9–0)	Cincinnati (10–0)	Michigan (10–1)	Oklahoma State (11–1)	Notre Dame (11–1)
6	Cincinnati (8–0)	Michigan (8–1)	Michigan (9–1)	Notre Dame (10–1)	Notre Dame (11–1)	Ohio State (10–2)

Key: Team increased ranking from previous week Team decreased ranking from previous week Team selected to College Football Playoff

== Playoff games ==
=== Semifinals ===
==== Cotton Bowl Classic ====
2021 Cotton Bowl Classic

Quarter	1	2	3	4	Total
No. 4 Cincinnati	3	0	3	0	6
No. 1 Alabama	7	10	0	10	27

at AT&T Stadium • Arlington, Texas

- Date: December 31, 2021
- Game time: 2:30 p.m. CST

==== Orange Bowl ====
2021 Orange Bowl

Quarter	1	2	3	4	Total
No. 3 Georgia	14	13	0	7	34
No. 2 Michigan	0	3	0	8	11

at Hard Rock Stadium • Miami Gardens, Florida

- Date: December 31, 2021
- Game time: 7:30 p.m. EST

=== Championship game ===
2022 College Football Playoff National Championship

Quarter	1	2	3	4	Total
No. 3 Georgia	0	6	7	20	33
No. 1 Alabama	3	6	0	9	18

at Lucas Oil Stadium • Indianapolis, Indiana

- Date: January 10, 2022
- Game time: 8:00 p.m. EST
