= College Football Playoff =

Playoff tournament in American college football

- Most recent season: 2025–26 College Football Playoff
- In operation: 2014–present
- Preceded by: Various contemporary and retroactive selectors (1869–1935); National polls (1936–1991); Bowl Coalition (1992–1994); Bowl Alliance (1995–1997); Bowl Championship Series (1998–2013)
- Number of teams: 12 (24 beginning in 2027)
- Championship trophy: College Football Playoff National Championship Trophy
- Television partner(s): ESPN (2014–present); ABC (2024–present); TNT/TBS/TruTV (2024–present; sublicensing agreement with ESPN)
- Most playoff appearances: Alabama (9)
- Most playoff wins: Alabama (10)
- Most playoff championships: Alabama (3)
- Conference with most appearances: SEC (10)
- Conference with most game wins: SEC (14)
- Conference with most championships: SEC (6)
- Last championship game: 2026 College Football Playoff National Championship
- Current champion: Indiana (1st title)
- Executive director: Richard M. Clark
- Website: collegefootballplayoff.com

The College Football Playoff (CFP) is an annual single-elimination tournament held to determine a national champion for the National Collegiate Athletic Association (NCAA) Division I Football Bowl Subdivision (FBS), the highest level of college football competition in the United States. It culminates in the College Football Playoff National Championship game. The inaugural tournament was held at the end of the 2014 NCAA Division I FBS football season under a four-team format. The CFP Board of Managers voted in 2023 to expand the playoff to 12 teams beginning in 2024, an arrangement that will last through the end of the 2026 season. Beginning in 2027, the playoff will further expand to a 24-team playoff through the 2031 season.

As the NCAA does not organize or award an official national championship for FBS football (instead merely recognizing the decisions made by any of a number of independent major championship selectors), the CFP's inception in 2014 marked the first time a major national championship selector in college football was able to determine their champion by using a bracket competition. A 13-member committee has selected and seeded the teams to take part in the CFP. This system differs from the use of polls or computer rankings that had previously been used to select the participants for the Bowl Championship Series (BCS), the title system used in FBS from 1998 to 2013. The CFP format used from 2014 to 2023 was a four-team single-elimination tournament, with participants determined and seeded by the selection committee.

The current 12-team CFP format features, for the first time, a first round of playoffs separated from bowl games. The first round consists of seeds 5 through 12 playing one another at the home stadium of the better seeded teams, or another venue of their choice. Then, the quarter-final and semi-final games consist of the New Year's Six bowl games, with a national championship game after that.

From 2014 through 2023, the two semifinal games rotated among the six New Year's Day bowl games: the Cotton Bowl, Fiesta Bowl, Orange Bowl, Peach Bowl, Rose Bowl, and Sugar Bowl. In addition to the teams selected for the playoff, from 2014 to 2023 the final CFP rankings were used in determining the participants for the four New Year's Six bowls that were not hosting the semifinals that year. Under the original four-team format, the two semifinal games were played on the same day; since the expansion of the CFP in 2024, they are played on back-to-back days. The College Football Playoff National Championship game is then played on the first Monday that is six or more days after the Semifinals. The venue of the championship game is then selected based on bids submitted by cities, similar to the NCAA Final Four.

The winner of the Championship Game is awarded the College Football Playoff National Championship Trophy, which was commissioned to avoid connections with the previous championship systems and their associated trophies. This included the AFCA "crystal football" trophy, which had been presented to the national champion since the 1990s due to the AFCA being contractually obligated to name the BCS champion as the Coaches Poll champion.

While the BCS brand was retired, BCS Properties, LLC still exists and owns all CFP trademarks. The CFP is separately administered by CFP Administration, LLC, which consists of representatives from each of the FBS conferences and the University of Notre Dame.

== Format ==
=== 4-team playoff (2014–2023) ===
From its formation in 2014 to the end of the 2023 season, the College Football Playoff used a four-team knockout bracket to determine the national champion. Six bowl games—the Rose Bowl, Sugar Bowl, Orange Bowl, Cotton Bowl, Fiesta Bowl, and Peach Bowl– rotated as hosts for the semifinals. The rotation was set on a three-year cycle with the following pairings: Rose/Sugar, Orange/Cotton, and Fiesta/Peach. The two semifinal bowls and the other four top-tier bowls were marketed as the New Year's Six. From 2014 to 2025, per contract, the Rose and Sugar Bowls were always on New Year's Day. Originally three games were held on New Year's Eve with the other three on New Year's Day. However, disappointing TV ratings in the first rotation led to games originally planned for New Year's Eve be moved to as early as December 27 in some years. The selection committee seeded the top four teams, and also assigned teams to the at-large bowls (Cotton, Fiesta, and Peach) in years when they did not host semifinals.

The four-team format pitted the No. 1-ranked team against No. 4 and No. 2 against No. 3. The seeding determined the semifinal bowl game assigned to each matchup; the No. 1 seed chose its bowl game to prevent it from playing in a "road" environment. There were no limits on the number of teams per conference, a change from Bowl Championship Series (BCS) rules. However, some non-semifinal bowl selections maintained their conference tie-ins, similarly to the BCS's automatic qualifier berths.

=== 12-team playoff (2024–2026) ===
The CFP expanded to a 12-team format for the 2024 through 2026 seasons.

Features of the 12-team playoff include:

- Guaranteed bids for the top five conference champions in the CFP rankings; no conference has an automatic bid, a conference must have a minimum of eight members for its champion to be eligible for a guaranteed bid.
  - For 2026, this was altered to guarantee each champion of a Power Four conference (ACC, Big Ten, Big 12, and SEC) a bid, along with one Group of Six team. Every Power Four conference champion is guaranteed a bid, regardless of their ranking in comparison to Group of Six conference champions. The Group of Six representative will be the highest-ranked team from that cohort, and does not have to be a conference champion.
- At-large bids for the seven highest-ranked remaining teams, which could include additional conference champions.
  - For 2026, if independent Notre Dame is ranked in the top 12, it is guaranteed an at-large bid. Notre Dame had a similar guarantee with the BCS if ranked in the top eight.
- For the 2024 season, the four highest-ranked conference champions received first-round byes. This was changed for the 2025 and 2026 seasons, with the four highest-ranked teams overall now receiving first-round byes, regardless of conference champion status.
- The remaining teams play each other in the first round at the home fields of the better seeds or an alternate venue of their choosing; match-ups are 5–12, 6–11, 7–10, and 8–9.
- The quarterfinals and semifinals are hosted by the New Year's Six bowl games (Rose, Sugar, Orange, Cotton, Peach, and Fiesta) with the semifinal games being determined on the same rotation as in the previous format, except the Rose Bowl, which will remain on New Year's Day annually and will always be a quarterfinal game.
- The championship game continues to be held at a separately determined neutral site.
- The playoff bracket is not reseeded at any time.
- First round games occur on the third weekend of December (with games being played on Friday night and Saturday), quarterfinal games on or around New Year's Day, semifinal games at least one week later, and the championship game will continue to be played on the first Monday of at least six days after the semifinals.
- The top three seeds will select their quarterfinal bowls in order of seeding, and the top seed will select their potential semifinal bowl.

=== 24-team playoff (beginning 2027) ===
The CFP will expand to a 24-team format beginning with the 2027 season.

Features of the 24-team playoff include:

- Guaranteed bids for each champion of the four power conferences (ACC, Big Ten, Big 12, and SEC). All four conferences have agreed to no longer hold conference championship games.
- Guaranteed bid for the highest-ranked team from the Group of Six conferences (American, CUSA, MAC, MW, Pac-12, and SBC).
- At-large bids for the 19 remaining highest-ranked teams, which could include additional conference champions
  - Independent Notre Dame's prior guarantee of an at-large bid if ranked in the top 12 is removed.
- Seeding will be based on teams ranked 1 to 24, regardless of conference champion status.
- Teams seeded 9–24 play the first round, with the better seed hosting the game on their home field, in this order: 9–24, 10–23, 11–22, 12–21, 13–20, 14–19, 15–18 and 16–17.
- Teams seeded 1–8 receive a first-round bye, and host the winners of the first round on their home fields in the second round.
- The quarterfinals and semifinals continue to be hosted by the New Year's Six bowl games (continuing to be determined by the 12 team format, with the Rose Bowl being on New Years Day and being a quarterfinal game), and the championship game remains at a rotating neutral site.
- First and second round games will occur on the second and third weekends of December, respectively (with games being played on Thursday–Saturday on those weekends). Scheduling of games from the quarterfinals onward will follow the same rules as in the previous format.
- The playoff bracket is not reseeded at any time.

== Venues ==
=== On-campus games ===
The teams seeded 5–12 will play first-round games hosted by the better seed, either at their home stadium or another venue of their choosing.

=== New Year's Six ===
The semifinal and quarterfinal rounds of the playoff are hosted by the New Year's Six: the Rose Bowl, Sugar Bowl, Orange Bowl, Cotton Bowl, Peach Bowl, and Fiesta Bowl. These games are played annually on or around New Year's Day and represent six of the oldest and most prestigious college football bowl games.

During the four-team playoff era, the bowls rotated on a three-year cycle. Two of the six bowls served as the CFP semifinals for any given year with the following pairings: Rose/Sugar, Orange/Cotton, and Fiesta/Peach. The year's four off-cycle bowls hosted bowl games outside of the CFP tournament bracket.

In the 12-team playoff format, four of the six bowls host quarterfinal games on or around New Year's Day. The winners advance to play in the semifinals, held in the two remaining bowls at least one week later. The semifinals are rotated through five of the bowls, with the Rose Bowl always hosting a quarterfinal so it can maintain its traditional New Year's Day game.

=== Championship game ===
Cities around the country bid to host each year's championship game. The playoff group's leaders make a selection from those proposals, in a similar fashion to other large sporting events, such as the NCAA Final Four. Officials say the championship game will be held in a different city each year, and that bids must propose host stadiums with a capacity of at least 65,000 spectators. Under the system, cities cannot host both a semifinal game and the title game in the same year.

In practice, since the inaugural CFP national championship game, every title game up to and including the 2029 season has been played (or is scheduled to be played) in a stadium that hosts at least one National Football League team and has been played indoors or in a warm-weather city.

== Selection process ==
=== Selection committee ===
The College Football Playoff Selection Committee consists of 13 members who generally serve three-year terms, although some initial 2013 selections served two- and four-year terms "to achieve a rotation" of members.

The 2026–27 CFP selection committee members are:

Member	Position	Conference affiliation	Term start
Troy Dannen	Nebraska athletic director	Big Ten	2025–26
Mark Dantonio	Former head coach of Cincinnati and Michigan State	Big Ten	2025–26
Doug Gillin	Appalachian State athletic director	Sun Belt	2026–27
Mark Harlan (Note: Replaced Mack Rhoades after week 2, who stepped down for personal reasons.)	Utah athletic director	Big 12	2025–26
Ivan Maisel	Former Sportswriter	At-large	2026–27
Gus Malzahn	Former head coach of Arkansas State, Auburn and UCF	At-large	2026–27
Chris Massaro	Middle Tennessee athletic director	C-USA	2026–27
Randall McDaniel	Former player for Arizona State	Big 12	2026–27
Mike Riley	Former head coach of Oregon State and Nebraska	At-large	2024–25
Jeff Tedford	Former head coach of California and Fresno State	At-large	2026–27
Wesley Walls	Former player for Ole Miss	At-large	2025–26
Carla Williams	Virginia athletic director	ACC	2024–25
Hunter Yurachek (Note: Chair for 2025–26 after week 2)	Arkansas athletic director	SEC	2024–25

The committee members include one current athletic director from each of the four major conferences—ACC, Big Ten, Big 12, and SEC—also known as the power conferences. Other members are former coaches, players, athletic directors, and administrators, plus a retired member of the media. The goal was for the panel to consist proportionally of current "Power Five" (now "Power Four") athletic directors, former coaches, and a third group of other voters, excluding current conference commissioners, coaches, and media members. During the selection process, organizers said they wanted the committee to be geographically balanced. Conference commissioners submitted lists totaling more than 100 names from which to select the final committee members.

=== Voting procedure ===
The committee releases its top 25 rankings weekly on Tuesdays in the second half of the regular season. During the season, the committee meets and releases rankings six or seven times, depending on the length of the season (the number of games is consistent, but the number of weeks those games are played over can vary from year to year). The group, which meets at the Gaylord Texan hotel in Grapevine, Texas, reportedly meets in person up to 10 total times a year.

A team's strength of schedule is one of the most pertinent considerations for the committee in making its selections. Other factors that the committee weighs are conference championships, team records, and head-to-head results, plus other points such as injuries and weather. Unlike the BCS system, the AP Poll, Coaches' Poll, and the Harris Poll, computer rankings are not used to make the selections. Advanced statistics and metrics are expected to be submitted to the committee, though like other analytics, they have no formal role in the decision. Committee members are not required to attend games.

Long said the panel considered less frequent rankings, but ultimately decided on a weekly release. "That's what the fans have become accustomed to, and we felt it would leave a void in college football without a ranking for several weeks," he said. Long also noted: "Early on there was some talk that we would go into a room at the end of the season and come out with a top four, but that didn't last long." In analyzing this change in thinking, Stewart Mandel of Sports Illustrated commented: "The whole point of the selection committee was to replace the simplistic horse-race nature of Top 25 polls – where teams only move up if someone above them loses – with a more deliberative evaluation method. Now the playoff folks are going to try to do both." Addressing the "pecking order" nature of traditional polls, George Schrodeder of USA Today wrote that "if it actually works as intended, we could see volatile swings" from week to week, with lower-ranked teams moving ahead of higher-ranked teams without either team losing (a rarity in traditional polls). Both Long and Bill Hancock, the CFP executive director, say they expect that to happen.

The committee's voting method uses multiple ballots, similar to the NCAA basketball tournament selection process and the entire process is facilitated through custom software developed by Code Authority in Frisco, Texas. From a large initial pool of teams, the group takes numerous votes on successive tiers of teams, considering six at a time and coming to a consensus on how they should be ranked, then repeating the process with the next tier of teams. Discussion and debate happens at each voting step. All votes are by secret ballot, and committee members do not make their ballots public. Each week's ranking process begins anew, with no weight given to the previous week's selections. In this fashion, the committee selects the teams to compete for the national championship.

Committee members who are currently employed or financially compensated by a school, or have family members who have a current financial relationship (which includes football players), are not allowed to vote for that school. During deliberations about a team's selection, members with such a conflict of interest cannot be present, but can answer factual questions about the institution. All committee members have past ties to certain NCAA institutions, but the committee decided to ignore those ties in the recusal requirements. "We just boiled it down to where we felt this group was fit to its high integrity and would differentiate from those past relationships," Long said. Some football writers, like Dennis Dodd and Mark Schlabach, have said the recusal arrangement isn't transparent or objective, suggesting that members' alma maters and former coaching jobs should be considered disqualifying conflicts of interest.

== History ==
=== Background ===
College football is arguably the oldest organized sport in the United States. It is substantially older than its professional counterpart, the NFL, and its earliest game, in 1869, was occurring at almost the same time professional baseball was getting started. The game developed into a popular sport with its own unique "post-season" of bowl games by the end of the first four decades of the 20th century, the time around which the NCAA began to develop and oversee post-season tournaments in other sports.

The NCAA did eventually come to oversee much of college football. For example, in 1957, the NCAA organized college football into University and College divisions, with larger programs in the University Division, smaller ones in the College Division. In 1973, the NCAA created Division I out of the University Division, and Divisions II and III out of the College Division for smaller programs with scholarships (Div II) and without scholarships (Div III). In 1978, Division I was sub-divided into I-A (largest programs) and I-AA, which would later be renamed FBS (I-A) and FCS (I-AA) respectively. As the smaller divisions and FCS subdivision were created, the NCAA organized post-season playoffs for them.

However, FBS programs resisted making any changes to how its post-season was organized. This was because of the popularity and profitability of bowl games, which had become major TV events in the decades following World War II. Bowl games, which for many years were only exhibition games, became so popular and important within college football that, starting in 1965, the AP (sportswriters) Poll waited until after the bowl games were completed to declare its national champion. The other major poll, UPI (Coaches) began doing so in 1974.

This evolution led the FBS annual "national champion" open to considerable debate and controversy. At times in the past, particularly during the polling era from 1936 to 1997, the term "mythical national championship" was frequently used, and larger programs have often unilaterally declared themselves national champions.

While the NCAA has never officially endorsed a championship team, it has documented the choices of some selectors in its official NCAA Football Bowl Subdivision Records publication. In addition, various analysts have independently published their own choices for each season. These opinions can often diverge with others as well as individual schools' claims to national titles, which may or may not correlate to the selections published elsewhere. Among the most widely recognized national champion selectors has been the Associated Press (AP), which has conducted the AP Poll of sportswriters since the 1936 season. (see also: List of AP Poll national champions). The AP's main competition, United Press International (UPI), created the first Coaches Poll in 1950. (see also: List of Coaches' Poll national champions). The two polls have picked different final national poll leaders at the end of 11 different seasons since then; this situation is referred to as a "split" national championship.

As the years passed, public pressure for a playoff grew, especially following seasons in which there were split national championships in the polls. By the 1990s, the sport underwent several changes that led to a playoff. The 1992 SEC Championship Game was an enormous risk that paid off well for the Southeastern Conference (SEC) that year and in future years and gave a glimpse at what post-season football might look like. Other conferences would follow suit over the next decade. FBS schools also began making changes to bowl games themselves in the 1990s to increase the likelihood of having the top two ranked teams play each other. However, existing bowl tie-ins with conferences made arrangements such as the Bowl Coalition (1992–1994) and then Bowl Alliance (1995–1997) clumsy and incomplete at best. By 1997, public pressure from fans, coaches, and commentators for a true playoff of some kind had grown too great to ignore.

The Bowl Championship Series in 1998 succeeded in finally bringing all major conferences and bowl games into the fold for a combined BCS National Championship Game rotated amongst the four largest, most profitable bowl games – Fiesta, Orange, Rose, and Sugar. BCS rankings originally incorporated the two major polls as well as a number of computer ranking systems to determine the two best teams at the end of the season. Although the BCS era did regularly produce compelling matchups, the winnowing selection of the top two teams resulted in many BCS controversies, most notably 2003's split national championship caused by the BCS rankings leaving USC, No. 1 in both major polls, out of the Sugar Bowl. This controversy ultimately led to the AP Poll withdrawing from the BCS, and additional fine-tuning of the BCS formula. After that, the controversies lessened, but the BCS approach itself had lost the confidence of many within the college football world, and ultimately the pressure for more change led to the development of the College Football Playoff.

=== Establishment ===
In 2014, the College Football Playoff made its debut, facilitating a multi-game single-elimination tournament for the first time in college football history. Four teams are seeded by a 13-member selection committee rather than by existing polls or mathematical rankings. The Cotton and Peach bowls were also brought into the fold. The two semifinal games became rotated among these New Year's Six bowl games, set on a three-year cycle with the following pairings: Rose/Sugar, Orange/Cotton, and Fiesta/Peach. The College Football Playoff National Championship is then played a week later at a separately determined neutral site.

=== Expansion ===
From the beginning of the CFP, many within college football wanted a playoff larger than four teams. The four team playoff seems to have been arrived at through a combination of concerns such as keeping the regular season meaningful, balancing academic schedules, and fear of eroding public support for bowl games.

Several years of the 4-team playoff led to growing calls for expansion. In June 2021, the CFP announced that it would begin studying an expansion to a 12-team playoff. The CFP stated that the starting time of any new format would only be determined after it had been approved.

On February 18, 2022, the CFP rejected the playoff proposal that had seemed to have already won approval, largely through resistance of the Atlantic Coast Conference. This pushed implementation of any changes to the playoff pool to no sooner than the 2026 season. However, that decision was reversed on September 2, 2022, following the announcement by USC and UCLA that they were leaving the Pac-12 for the Big Ten. The "alliance" between the ACC, Pac-12, and Big Ten dissolved, and along with it resistance to playoff expansion. The CFP Board of Managers unanimously voted to expand the playoffs to 12 teams, with the earliest possible change happening in the 2024 season.

Conferences and bowls negotiated early expansion for several months during the fall of 2022. A potential sticking point was the Rose Bowl, which desired to keep its traditional 5:00 p.m. ET/2:00 p.m. PT kickoff on New Year's Day or January 2, even during years it will host the semifinals instead of the quarterfinals. The problem was resolved when the commissioners gave the Rose Bowl an ultimatum to accept no special treatment or be excluded from the new playoffs, with the bowl agreeing to forgo its demands. By the end of 2022, a new 12-team format was approved to be implemented for the 2024 season. Originally, the expanded playoff was to include the top six ranked conference champions and six at-large bids, though it was later changed to five conference champions and seven at-large bids after the 2020s conference realignment resulted in the Pac-12 Conference dropping to two members.

After the expansion to 12 teams, talks soon began to expand the playoff further. In February 2026, ESPN's Pete Thamel reported that the Big Ten had developed a plan to expand to 24 teams, which would be made up of 23 at-large bids and one bid guaranteed to a Group of Six team. Under the Big Ten's plan, the playoff would expand to 16 teams for the 2027 and 2028 seasons, then permanently move to 24 teams in 2029. The expansion plan would also involve the elimination of conference championship games for the four power conferences. The plan was met with opposition, as the SEC instead pushed a 16-team playoff under a "5+11" model (five conference champions and 11 at-large bids). Other opposition was due to concerns over the impact of expansion on the "primetime" window that the Army–Navy Game holds on the second Saturday in December, as no other FBS games are traditionally played on that day. In October 2026, Thamel reported that the CFP was nearing a deal to expand to 24 teams for the 2027 season, which will include the four power conference champions, the highest-ranked Group of Six conference champion, and 19 at-large bids. On November 9, 2026, it was reported that the CFP and ESPN finalized a five-year, $1.9 billion deal to officially expand the playoff to 24 teams and eliminate power conference championship games. Also as part of the agreement, each Power Four team (including Notre Dame, a football independent but otherwise a full ACC member) will be required to play at least 10 games against other teams from that grouping in order to be considered for the CFP. Group conference teams (including UConn, a football independent and full member of the non-football Big East Conference) will have to play at least 10 games against FBS opposition. For the 2027 season only, Oregon State and Washington State, which were left behind when the Pac-12 collapsed in 2024, will be treated as Power Four opponents.

== Impact on scheduling ==
"Strength of schedule will become such an important factor ... that if you want to be under consideration, you need to have a more meaningful schedule than perhaps you've had in previous years."

— Tom Jernstedt, selection committee member

Due to the increased emphasis on strength of schedule, teams have considered playing more challenging opponents during the non-conference portion of their schedules. Some teams have traditionally played three or four "weak" non-conference opponents, but wins against such low-level competition are unlikely to impress the committee. For teams on the cusp of making the playoff four, "I think one of the first things the committee will look at is strength of schedule," said selector Oliver Luck.

Teams in the Big Ten, Big 12 and Pac-12 play nine conference games on their twelve-game schedules and thus only have flexibility in choosing their opponents for the three non-league games. Some programs are opting to increase their schedule strength by scheduling high-profile matchups at neutral sites and on weeknights, garnering primetime TV exclusivity.

In response to the new playoff system, the Southeastern Conference considered increasing its conference schedule from eight to nine games, with Alabama coach Nick Saban a vocal proponent. According to Jon Solomon of the Birmingham News, "The prevailing opinion among SEC athletics directors: The SEC is difficult enough that there's no need for a ninth game." Some in the conference, like Mississippi State athletic director Scott Stricklin, expressed the opinion that a nine-game SEC schedule would result in more teams with two losses. Commissioner Michael Slive and Vanderbilt AD David Williams, among others, supported a stronger out-of-league schedule, which would likely impress the committee. In April 2014, the league voted to mandate that all SEC teams must play a Power Five foe (ACC, Big Ten, Big 12, Pac-12, or independent Notre Dame) in its non-conference slate beginning in 2016. Slive noted this rule "gives us the added strength-of-schedule we were seeking". In 2014, the first year of the College Football Playoff, one team (Georgia) played two opponents from the Power Five, nine of the 14 teams played one Power Five conference opponent and three lower-level opponents (including one FCS school), and four teams did not face a Power Five foe. In the spring of 2015, the SEC decided to count games played against FBS independent BYU and Army toward its Power Five requirement.

The ACC, whose teams also play eight conference games (plus Notre Dame at least once every three years), also considered moving to a nine-game conference schedule. However, the league opted to stay with the eight-plus-Notre Dame model, stipulating instead that teams would have to play one Power Five school in their non-league slates beginning in 2017, which would include the Notre Dame game or other ACC schools, as will games against another FBS independent, BYU. Despite the push to increase schedule strength, some ACC coaches preferred the scheduling flexibility available with fewer permanent fixtures on a team's slate. Opinion was split among league athletic directors on moving to a nine-game schedule prior to the vote. An SEC expansion to a nine-game schedule would limit the ACC's opportunities to play Power Five non-conference opponents.

== Appearances ==
=== Selections by year ===
During the ten seasons of the 4-team era of the College Football Playoff (2014–2023), 32 of the 40 selected teams were conference champions from one of the power conferences. Three 1-loss power conference teams were selected without playing in their conference championship game, and three others were selected after losing their respective conference championship games. One undefeated independent team was selected during this era, as well as one undefeated conference champion from a Group of Five conference. No teams with two or more losses were ever selected by the committee to compete in the 4-team playoff.

Season	Playoff	Format	Selected			Not selected		
Season	Playoff	Format	Power conference champions	Other power conference teams	Group of Five conference champions	Power conference champions	One-loss power conference teams	Ranked Group of Five conference champions
2014	2014–15	4-team	1 Alabama (12–1); 2 Oregon (12–1); 3 Florida State (13–0); 4 Ohio State (12–1)			5 Baylor (11–1); 6 TCU (11–1)		20 Boise State (11–2)
2015	2015–16	4-team	1 Clemson (13–0); 2 Alabama (12–1); 3 Michigan State (12–1); 4 Oklahoma (11–1)			6 Stanford (11–2)	5 Iowa (12–1); 7 Ohio State (11–1)	18 Houston (12–1)
2016	2016–17	4-team	1 Alabama (13–0); 2 Clemson (12–1); 4 Washington (12–1)	3 Ohio State (11–1)		5 Penn State (11–2); 7 Oklahoma (10–2)		15 Western Michigan (13–0); 24 Temple (10–3)
2017	2017–18	4-team	1 Clemson (12–1); 2 Oklahoma (12–1); 3 Georgia (12–1)	4 Alabama (11–1)		5 Ohio State (11–2); 8 USC (11–2)	6 Wisconsin (12–1)	12 UCF (12–0)
2018	2018–19	4-team	1 Alabama (13–0); 2 Clemson (13–0); 4 Oklahoma (12–1)	3 Notre Dame (12–0)		6 Ohio State (12–1); 9 Washington (10–3)		8 UCF (12–0); 21 Fresno State (11–2)
2019	2019–20	4-team	1 LSU (13–0); 2 Ohio State (13–0); 3 Clemson (13–0); 4 Oklahoma (12–1)			6 Oregon (11–2)		17 Memphis (12–1); 19 Boise State (12–1); 20 Appalachian State (12–1)
2020	2020–21	4-team	1 Alabama (11–0); 2 Clemson (10–1); 3 Ohio State (6–0)	4 Notre Dame (10–1)		6 Oklahoma (8–2); 25 Oregon (4–2)	11 Indiana (6–1); 5 Texas A&M (8–1)	8 Cincinnati (9–0); 12 Coastal Carolina (11–0); 19 Louisiana (9–1); 22 San Jose State (7–0)
2021	2021–22	4-team	1 Alabama (12–1); 2 Michigan (12–1)	3 Georgia (12–1)	4 Cincinnati (13–0)	7 Baylor (11–2); 11 Utah (10–3); 12 Pittsburgh (11–2)	5 Notre Dame (11–1)	23 Louisiana (12–1)
2022	2022–23	4-team	1 Georgia (13–0); 2 Michigan (13–0)	3 TCU (12–1); 4 Ohio State (11–1)		7 Clemson (11–2); 8 Utah (10–3); 9 Kansas State (10–3)		16 Tulane (11–2); 24 Troy (11–2); 25 UTSA (11–2)
2023	2023–24	4-team	1 Michigan (13–0); 2 Washington (13–0); 3 Texas (12–1); 4 Alabama (12–1)			5 Florida State (13–0)	6 Georgia (12–1); 7 Ohio State (11–1)	23 Liberty (13–0); 24 SMU (11–2)
2024	2024–25	12-team	1 Oregon (13–0); 2 Georgia (11–2); 12 Arizona State (11–2); 16 Clemson (10–3)	3 Texas (11–2); 4 Penn State (11–2); 5 Notre Dame (11–1); 6 Ohio State (10–2); 7 Tennessee (10–2); 8 Indiana (11–1); 10 SMU (11–2)	9 Boise State (12–1)			22 Army (11–1)
2025	2025–26	12-team	1 Indiana (13–0); 3 Georgia (12–1); 4 Texas Tech (12–1)	2 Ohio State (12–1); 5 Oregon (11–1); 6 Ole Miss (11–1); 7 Texas A&M (11–1); 8 Oklahoma (10–2); 9 Alabama (10–3); 10 Miami (10–2)	20 Tulane (11–2); 24 James Madison (12–1)	Duke (8–5)		

=== Appearances by team ===
==== Summary table ====
- CH National champion
- RU Lost in CFP National Championship
- SF Lost in CFP semifinals
- QF Lost in CFP quarterfinals (2024–present)
- 12 Lost in CFP first round (2024–present)
- Next to each team's result is their seed.

Team	Conference (as of 2026)	#	QF	SF	CG	CH	14	15	16	17	18	19	20	21	22	23	24	25
Alabama	SEC	9	9	8	6	3	¹SF	²CH	¹RU	⁴CH	¹RU		¹CH	¹RU		⁴SF		⁹QF
Clemson	ACC	7	6	6	4	2		¹RU	²CH	¹SF	²CH	³RU	²SF				¹²12	
Ohio State	Big Ten	7	7	6	3	2	⁴CH		³SF			²SF	³RU		⁴SF		⁸CH	²QF
Georgia	SEC	5	5	3	3	2				³RU				³CH	¹CH		²QF	³QF
Michigan	Big Ten	3	3	3	1	1								²SF	²SF	¹CH		
Indiana	Big Ten	2	1	1	1	1											¹⁰12	¹CH
LSU	SEC	1	1	1	1	1						¹CH						
Notre Dame	Independent	3	3	3	1	-					³SF		⁴SF				⁷RU	
Oregon	Big Ten	3	3	2	1	-	²RU										¹QF	⁵SF
Washington	Big Ten	2	2	2	1	-			⁴SF							²RU		
TCU	Big 12	1	1	1	1	-									³RU			
Miami (FL)	ACC	1	1	1	1	-												¹⁰RU
Oklahoma	SEC	5	4	4	-	-		⁴SF		²SF	⁴SF	⁴SF						⁸12
Texas	SEC	2	2	2	-	-										³SF	⁵SF	
Florida State	ACC	1	1	1	-	-	³SF											
Michigan State	Big Ten	1	1	1	-	-		³SF										
Cincinnati	Big 12	1	1	1	-	-								⁴SF				
Penn State	Big Ten	1	1	1	-	-											⁶SF	
Ole Miss	SEC	1	1	1	-	-												⁶SF
Boise State	Pac-12	1	1	-	-	-											³QF	
Arizona State	Big 12	1	1	-	-	-											⁴QF	
Texas Tech	Big 12	1	1	-	-	-												⁴QF
Tennessee	SEC	1	-	-	-	-											⁹12	
SMU	ACC	1	-	-	-	-											¹¹12	
Texas A&M	SEC	1	-	-	-	-												⁷12
Tulane	American	1	-	-	-	-												¹¹12
James Madison	SBC	1	-	-	-	-												¹²12

Teams that have won the CFP National Championship
3, 2, 1

==== Detail ====
Key
Won CFP National Championship

Team	Conf.	Apps.	Champs.	W	L	%	Season	Seed	Results			
Team	Conf.	Apps.	Champs.	W	L	%	Season	Seed	First round	Quarterfinals	Semifinals	Nat'l Champ.
Alabama	SEC	9	3	10	6	.625	2014	1	—N/a	—N/a	L Sugar	—N/a
Alabama	SEC	9	3	10	6	.625	2015	2	—N/a	—N/a	W Cotton	W Nat'l Champ.
Alabama	SEC	9	3	10	6	.625	2016	1	—N/a	—N/a	W Peach	L Nat'l Champ.
Alabama	SEC	9	3	10	6	.625	2017	4	—N/a	—N/a	W Sugar	W Nat'l Champ.
Alabama	SEC	9	3	10	6	.625	2018	1	—N/a	—N/a	W Orange	L Nat'l Champ.
Alabama	SEC	9	3	10	6	.625	2020	1	—N/a	—N/a	W Rose	W Nat'l Champ.
Alabama	SEC	9	3	10	6	.625	2021	1	—N/a	—N/a	W Cotton	L Nat'l Champ.
Alabama	SEC	9	3	10	6	.625	2023	4	—N/a	—N/a	L Rose	—N/a
Alabama	SEC	9	3	10	6	.625	2025	9	W On-campus	L Rose	—N/a	—N/a
Ohio State	Big Ten	7	2	7	5	.583	2014	4	—N/a	—N/a	W Sugar	W Nat'l Champ.
Ohio State	Big Ten	7	2	7	5	.583	2016	3	—N/a	—N/a	L Fiesta	—N/a
Ohio State	Big Ten	7	2	7	5	.583	2019	2	—N/a	—N/a	L Fiesta	—N/a
Ohio State	Big Ten	7	2	7	5	.583	2020	3	—N/a	—N/a	W Sugar	L Nat'l Champ.
Ohio State	Big Ten	7	2	7	5	.583	2022	4	—N/a	—N/a	L Peach	—N/a
Ohio State	Big Ten	7	2	7	5	.583	2024	8	W On-campus	W Rose	W Cotton	W Nat'l Champ.
Ohio State	Big Ten	7	2	7	5	.583	2025	2	Bye	L Cotton	—N/a	—N/a
Clemson	ACC	7	2	6	5	.545	2015	1	—N/a	—N/a	W Orange	L Nat'l Champ.
Clemson	ACC	7	2	6	5	.545	2016	2	—N/a	—N/a	W Fiesta	W Nat'l Champ.
Clemson	ACC	7	2	6	5	.545	2017	1	—N/a	—N/a	L Sugar	—N/a
Clemson	ACC	7	2	6	5	.545	2018	2	—N/a	—N/a	W Cotton	W Nat'l Champ.
Clemson	ACC	7	2	6	5	.545	2019	3	—N/a	—N/a	W Fiesta	L Nat'l Champ.
Clemson	ACC	7	2	6	5	.545	2020	2	—N/a	—N/a	L Sugar	—N/a
Clemson	ACC	7	2	6	5	.545	2024	12	L On-campus	—N/a	—N/a	—N/a
Georgia	SEC	5	2	5	3	.625	2017	3	—N/a	—N/a	W Rose	L Nat'l Champ.
Georgia	SEC	5	2	5	3	.625	2021	3	—N/a	—N/a	W Orange	W Nat'l Champ.
Georgia	SEC	5	2	5	3	.625	2022	1	—N/a	—N/a	W Peach	W Nat'l Champ.
Georgia	SEC	5	2	5	3	.625	2024	2	Bye	L Sugar	—N/a	—N/a
Georgia	SEC	5	2	5	3	.625	2025	3	Bye	L Sugar	—N/a	—N/a
Oklahoma	Big 12	5	0	0	5	.000	2015	4	—N/a	—N/a	L Orange	—N/a
Oklahoma	Big 12	5	0	0	5	.000	2017	2	—N/a	—N/a	L Rose	—N/a
Oklahoma	Big 12	5	0	0	5	.000	2018	4	—N/a	—N/a	L Orange	—N/a
Oklahoma	Big 12	5	0	0	5	.000	2019	4	—N/a	—N/a	L Peach	—N/a
Oklahoma	SEC	5	0	0	5	.000	2025	8	L On-campus	—N/a	—N/a	—N/a
Oregon	Pac-12	3	0	3	3	.500	2014	2	—N/a	—N/a	W Rose	L Nat'l Champ.
Oregon	Big Ten	3	0	3	3	.500	2024	1	Bye	L Rose	—N/a	—N/a
Oregon	Big Ten	3	0	3	3	.500	2025	5	W On-campus	W Orange	L Peach	—N/a
Notre Dame	Independent	3	0	3	3	.500	2018	3	—N/a	—N/a	L Cotton	—N/a
Notre Dame	Independent	3	0	3	3	.500	2020	4	—N/a	—N/a	L Rose	—N/a
Notre Dame	Independent	3	0	3	3	.500	2024	7	W On-campus	W Sugar	W Orange	L Nat'l Champ.
Michigan	Big Ten	3	1	2	2	.500	2021	2	—N/a	—N/a	L Orange	—N/a
Michigan	Big Ten	3	1	2	2	.500	2022	2	—N/a	—N/a	L Fiesta	—N/a
Michigan	Big Ten	3	1	2	2	.500	2023	1	—N/a	—N/a	W Rose	W Nat'l Champ.
Indiana	Big Ten	2	1	3	1	.750	2024	10	L On-campus	—N/a	—N/a	—N/a
Indiana	Big Ten	2	1	3	1	.750	2025	1	Bye	W Rose	W Peach	W Nat'l Champ.
Texas	Big 12	2	0	2	2	.500	2023	3	—N/a	—N/a	L Sugar	—N/a
Texas	SEC	2	0	2	2	.500	2024	5	W On-campus	W Peach	L Cotton	—N/a
Washington	Pac-12	2	0	1	2	.333	2016	4	—N/a	—N/a	L Peach	—N/a
Washington	Pac-12	2	0	1	2	.333	2023	2	—N/a	—N/a	W Sugar	L Nat'l Champ.
LSU	SEC	1	1	2	0	1.000	2019	1	—N/a	—N/a	W Peach	W Nat'l Champ.
Miami (FL)	ACC	1	0	3	1	.750	2025	10	W On-campus	W Cotton	W Fiesta	L Nat'l Champ
Penn State	Big Ten	1	0	2	1	.667	2024	6	W On-campus	W Fiesta	L Orange	—N/a
Ole Miss	SEC	1	0	2	1	.667	2025	6	W On-campus	W Sugar	L Fiesta	—N/a
TCU	Big 12	1	0	1	1	.500	2022	3	—N/a	—N/a	W Fiesta	L Nat'l Champ.
Florida State	ACC	1	0	0	1	.000	2014	3	—N/a	—N/a	L Rose	—N/a
Michigan State	Big Ten	1	0	0	1	.000	2015	3	—N/a	—N/a	L Cotton	—N/a
Cincinnati	AAC	1	0	0	1	.000	2021	4	—N/a	—N/a	L Cotton	—N/a
Boise State	MW	1	0	0	1	.000	2024	3	Bye	L Fiesta	—N/a	—N/a
Arizona State	Big 12	1	0	0	1	.000	2024	4	Bye	L Peach	—N/a	—N/a
Tennessee	SEC	1	0	0	1	.000	2024	9	L On-campus	—N/a	—N/a	—N/a
SMU	ACC	1	0	0	1	.000	2024	11	L On-campus	—N/a	—N/a	—N/a
Texas Tech	Big 12	1	0	0	1	.000	2025	4	Bye	L Orange	—N/a	—N/a
Texas A&M	SEC	1	0	0	1	.000	2025	7	L On-campus	—N/a	—N/a	—N/a
Tulane	American	1	0	0	1	.000	2025	11	L On-campus	—N/a	—N/a	—N/a
James Madison	SBC	1	0	0	1	.000	2025	12	L On-campus	—N/a	—N/a	—N/a

=== Records by round ===
Team	1R	QF	SF	NC	Total
Alabama	1–0	0–1	6–2	3–3	10–6
Ohio State	1–0	1–1	3–3	2–1	7–5
Clemson	0–1	—	4–2	2–2	6–5
Georgia	—	0–2	3–0	2–1	5–3
Indiana	0–1	1–0	1–0	1–0	3–1
Oregon	1–0	1–1	1–1	0–1	3–3
Notre Dame	1–0	1–0	1–2	0–1	3–3
Miami (FL)	1–0	1–0	1–0	0–1	3–1
Michigan	—	—	1–2	1–0	2–2
LSU	—	—	1–0	1–0	2–0
Texas	1–0	1–0	0–2	—	2–2
Penn State	1–0	1–0	0–1	—	2–1
Ole Miss	1–0	1–0	0–1	—	2–1
Washington	—	—	1–1	0–1	1–2
TCU	—	—	1–0	0–1	1–1
Oklahoma	0–1	—	0–4	—	0–5
Florida State	—	—	0–1	—	0–1
Michigan State	—	—	0–1	—	0–1
Cincinnati	—	—	0–1	—	0–1
Arizona State	—	0–1	—	—	0–1
Boise State	—	0–1	—	—	0–1
Texas Tech	—	0–1	—	—	0–1
SMU	0–1	—	—	—	0–1
Tennessee	0–1	—	—	—	0–1
Texas A&M	0–1	—	—	—	0–1
James Madison	0–1	—	—	—	0–1
Tulane	0–1	—	—	—	0–1

=== Appearances by conference ===
Appearances reflect conference affiliations at the time each game was played. For example, Oregon played in 2014 as a member of the Pac-12, and in 2024 as a member of the Big Ten. Notre Dame, an independent school, played the 2020 season as a member of the ACC.

Conf.	Apps.	Champs.	G	W	L	%	Season											
Conf.	Apps.	Champs.	G	W	L	%	2014	2015	2016	2017	2018	2019	2020	2021	2022	2023	2024	2025
SEC	20	6	35	21	14	.600	0–1	2–0	1–1	3–1	1–1	2–0	2–0	3–1	2–0	0–1	2–3	3–5
Big Ten	16	4	28	16	12	.571	2–0	0–1	0–1	—N/a	—N/a	0–1	1–1	0–1	0–2	2–0	6–3	5–2
ACC	10	2	18	9	9	.500	0–1	1–1	2–0	0–1	2–0	1–1	0–2	—N/a	—N/a	—N/a	0–2	3–1
Big 12	8	0	9	1	8	.111	—N/a	0–1	—N/a	0–1	0–1	0–1	—N/a	—N/a	1–1	0–1	0–1	0–1
Pac-12	3	0	5	2	3	.400	1–1	—N/a	0–1	—N/a	—N/a	—N/a	—N/a	—N/a	—N/a	1–1	—N/a	—N/a
American	2	0	2	0	2	.000	—N/a	—N/a	—N/a	—N/a	—N/a	—N/a	—N/a	0–1	—N/a	—N/a	—N/a	0–1
MW	1	0	1	0	1	.000	—N/a	—N/a	—N/a	—N/a	—N/a	—N/a	—N/a	—N/a	—N/a	—N/a	0–1	—N/a
SBC	1	0	1	0	1	.000	—N/a	—N/a	—N/a	—N/a	—N/a	—N/a	—N/a	—N/a	—N/a	—N/a	—N/a	0–1
Independents	2	0	5	3	2	.600	—N/a	—N/a	—N/a	—N/a	0–1	—N/a	—N/a	—N/a	—N/a	—N/a	3–1	—N/a

== Broadcasting ==
=== 4-team playoff ===
In 2013, ESPN acquired the television broadcast rights to all six CFP bowls and the National Championship through the 2025–26 season. ESPN then reached 12-year agreements to retain rights to the Rose Bowl, Orange Bowl, and Sugar Bowl following the dissolution of the Bowl Championship Series. In November of that year, ESPN reached a 12-year deal to broadcast the remaining three bowls, the championship game, as well as shoulder programming such as ranking shows. As a whole, the contract is valued at around $470 million per year, or nearly $5.7 billion for the life of the contract.

=== 12-team playoff ===
On March 19, 2024, ESPN reached a six-year extension, valued at $1.3 billion per year, adding the four new first-round playoff games to their existing rights to the New Year's Six bowls and the National Championship Game. ESPN was also given the right to sublicense a select number of games; in May 2024, TNT Sports signed a five-year sublicensing agreement to broadcast two first-round games per year (including during the two years of the amended contract), and two quarterfinal and one semifinal games per year when the new contract begins (beginning in the 2026–27 season). For 2024–25 and 2025–26, the other two first-round playoff games were simulcast on ABC (in 2026–27 only one first-round playoff game will simulcast on ABC, while the other will be a ESPN exclusive). In addition, when the new contract begins in 2026–27, ESPN will also simulcast the National Championship Game on ABC (marking a return of the game to broadcast television for the first time since 2010), and has the option to simulcast any additional games from the quarterfinal and semifinal rounds (in 2026–27 ABC will simulcast 1 game each from the Quarterfinals and Semifinals), in addition to the first round games that are not sublicensed on TNT Sports (it is expected that at least one game per round will be simulcast on ABC).

=== 24-team playoff ===
In November 2026, ESPN reached a new agreement through the 2031–32 season, extending its rights to include the entire 24-team playoff format when it begins in the 2027–28 season. ESPN will simulcast at least three games from the new first and second round games in addition to one game per round in the quarterfinals and semifinals (along with the championship game) on ABC. ESPN also keeps the rights to sublicense games in addition to its existing agreement with TNT.

=== Ratings ===
The inaugural College Football Playoff games in January 2015 generated larger ratings than previous BCS games. The 2015 College Football Playoff National Championship had an 18.9 Nielsen rating and was watched by approximately 33.4 million people, the largest broadcast audience of all time on American cable television (non-broadcast), according to AdWeek. That was a 31 percent audience increase over the previous year's championship game and a 22 percent increase over the BCS title game's best rating on cable (a 16.1 rating in 2011). The semifinal games, the 2015 Rose Bowl and 2015 Sugar Bowl, saw 28.16 million and 28.27 million viewers, respectively. According to ESPN, these games also set (and briefly held) all-time records for cable TV viewership.

In 2015, the ratings for the two semifinal games were down from the prior season's equivalents, with the Orange Bowl reaching a 9.7 rating (in comparison to 15.5 for the 2015 Rose Bowl) and the Cotton Bowl reaching a 9.9 rating (in comparison to a 15.3 rating for the 2015 Sugar Bowl). On the online WatchESPN streaming service, excluding 2014 FIFA World Cup games, the Cotton Bowl and the Orange Bowl drew the second and third-largest streaming audiences in the service's history, behind the 2015 national championship. The ratings drops were attributed to the New Year's Eve time slot, as fewer people were at home to watch the game. The decline in ratings was a factor in changes for the scheduling of future CFP semi-final games.

== Revenue ==
In 2012, ESPN reportedly agreed to pay about $7.3 billion over 12 years for broadcasting rights to all seven games, an average of about $608 million per year. That includes $215 million per year which was already committed to the Rose, Sugar and Orange bowls, plus $470–475 million annually for the rest of the package. By comparison, the most recent contract with the BCS and the Rose Bowl had paid approximately $155 million per year for five games.

The average revenue to the new system over 12 years is to be about $500 million per year. After $125–150 million in expenses, the Power Five conferences split about 71.5 percent of the remaining money, for an approximate average payout of $250 million a year ($50 million per league) over the life of the contract. The "Group of Five" conferences split 27 percent, about $90 million a year ($18 million per league). Notre Dame receives around one percent, about $3.5–4 million, and other FBS independents get about 0.5 percent of the deal.

Extra revenue goes to conferences in contracts with the Rose, Sugar, and Orange bowls, which split revenue 50/50 between their participating leagues. In non-semifinal years, the Rose Bowl's TV revenue would be divided between the Big Ten and Pac-12 conferences; likewise, the Sugar Bowl and Orange Bowl revenue to its participant conferences. When those bowls are semifinal games, the money is distributed by the playoff system to all FBS conferences. ESPN has paid about $80 million a year each for the Rose and Sugar bowls over 12 years. The Orange Bowl deal is worth $55 million per year. For example, in a non-semifinal year, the Big Ten could receive about $90 million (half of its $80 million Rose Bowl deal plus about $50 million from the playoff system).

Conferences receive an additional $6 million each year for each team it places in the semifinals and $4 million for a team in one of the three at-large bowls; Notre Dame receives the same amount in either scenario. No additional money is awarded for reaching the championship game.

The Power Five conferences and the "Group of Five" have not decided on their respective revenue-sharing formulas, though the SEC initially receives more revenue than the other four Power Five conferences due to its BCS success. Reports say the money is to be divided based on several criteria such as "on-field success, teams' expenses, marketplace factors and academic performance of student-athletes". The playoff system awards academic performance bonuses of $300,000 per school for meeting the NCAA's Academic Progress Rate standard of 930. In a hypothetical 14-team conference, $4.2 million ($300,000 x 14) would be allocated to that league, and if only 12 of the 14 members meet the APR standard, then each of the 12 schools would receive $350,000 ($4.2 million / 12), penalizing schools that fall below the threshold.

== Leadership ==
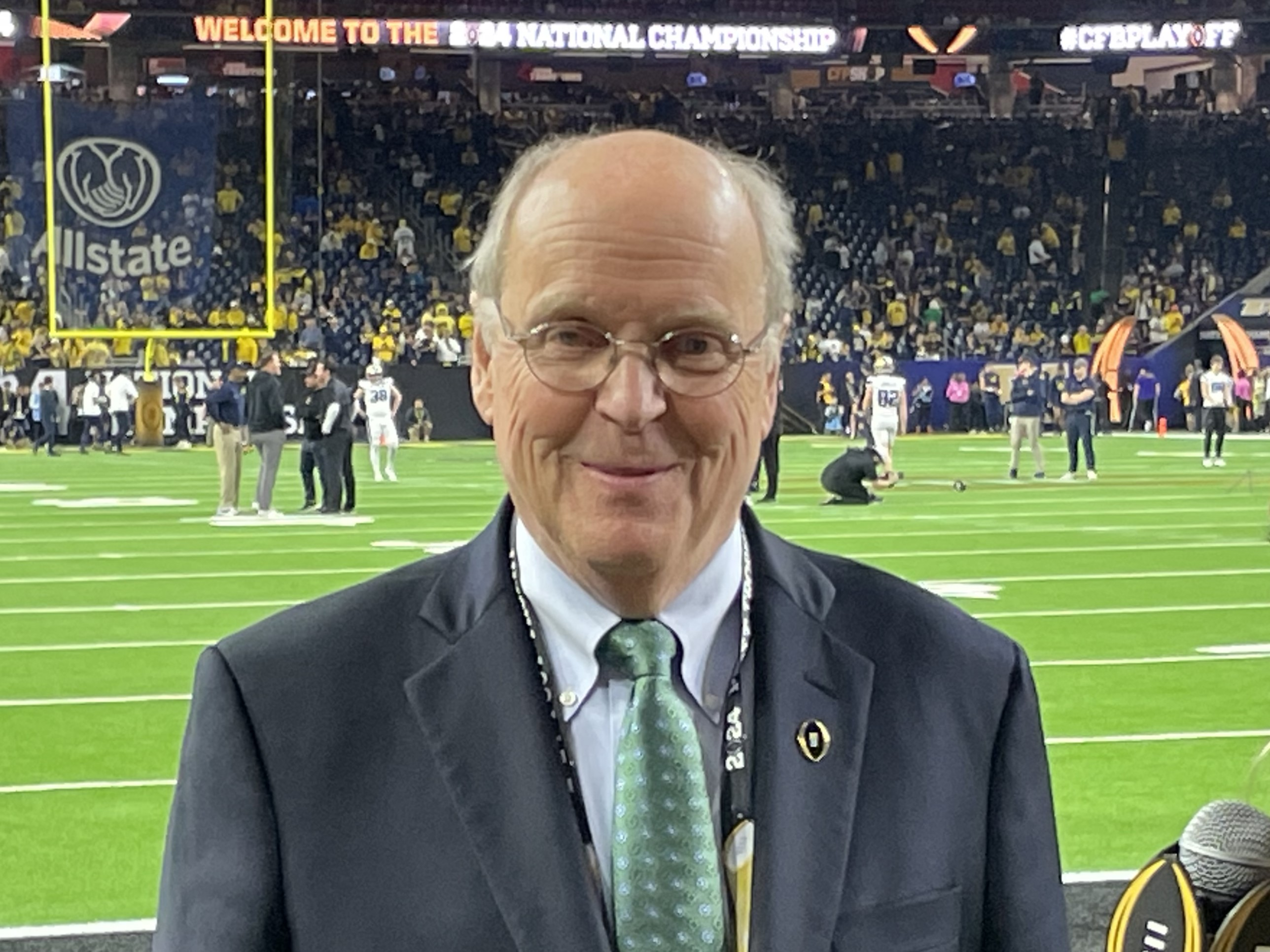
Bill Hancock served as Executive Director of the CFP from its creation in 2014 until his retirement in 2024

BCS Properties, LLC holds all properties related to the College Football Playoff. Previous BCS commissioner Bill Hancock is the executive director of the playoff organization, with former SEC Assistant Commissioner for Championships Byron Hatch as COO. Like the BCS, the playoff system's management committee consists of the conference commissioners from the 10 FBS conferences and Notre Dame's athletic director. The playoff system's headquarters is in Irving, Texas.

=== Board of Managers ===
According to the CFP website, the system's operations are controlled by the Board of Managers, which consists of presidents and chancellors of the playoff group's member universities. The eleven members have sole authority to develop, review and approve annual budgets, policies and operating guidelines. The group also selects the company's officers.

- Eric Barron – President, Penn State (Big Ten)
- Rodney Bennett – President, Southern Miss (C-USA)
- Joe Castro – Chancellor, California State University; former president, Fresno State (Mountain West)
- Gordon Gee – President, West Virginia (Big 12)
- Jack Hawkins – Chancellor, Troy (Sun Belt)
- Rev. John I. Jenkins – President, Notre Dame (Independent)
- Mark Keenum – President, Mississippi State (SEC)
- Kirk Schulz – President, Washington State (Pac-12)
- John Thrasher – President, Florida State (ACC)
- Satish Tripathi – President, Buffalo (MAC)
- R. Gerald Turner – President, SMU (The American)

=== Athletics Directors Advisory Group ===
According to the CFP website, the Athletics Directors Advisory Group is appointed by the management committee to "offer counsel" on the operations of the system. As an advisory board, it has no authority in the management of the CFP.

- Gary Barta, Iowa (Big Ten)
- Tom Bowen, Memphis (The American)
- Tom Burman, Wyoming (Mountain West)
- Joe Castiglione, Oklahoma (SEC)
- Jeremy Foley, Florida (SEC)
- Dan Guerrero, UCLA (Big 10)
- Chris Massaro, Middle Tennessee (C-USA)
- Terry Mohajir, UCF (Big 12)
- Mike O'Brien, Toledo (MAC)
- Stan Wilcox, Florida State (ACC)

== Controversies ==
Although being generally well received, the College Football Playoff has been criticized and subject to controversies, much like its predecessor, the Bowl Championship Series, which had several controversies.

=== Team selection ===
During the four-team playoff era, at least one Power Five champion was left out of the playoffs every season. However, not all teams selected in the four-team playoff were conference winners:

- In 2016, Ohio State (11–1) – who did not qualify for the Big Ten Championship Game – was selected by the committee. Both the Big Ten champions Penn State (11–2) and Big 12 champions Oklahoma (10–2) had worse records; Penn State had advanced to the conference championship game over Ohio State by virtue of a close victory earlier in the season; Oklahoma lost at home to Ohio State early in the season;
- In 2017, Alabama (11–1) – who did not qualify for the SEC Championship Game due to a final-week loss against SEC runner-up Auburn – was selected ahead of the Big Ten's Ohio State (11–2) and Pac-12's USC (11–2);
- In 2021, Georgia (12–1) lost the SEC Championship Game to Alabama (12–1) but was selected over three Power Five conference champions who had multiple losses; the AAC's Cincinnati (13–0) was the first Group of Five team to be selected to the playoff.
- In 2022, TCU (12–1) was selected for the playoff despite losing the Big 12 Championship Game to Kansas State (10–3) in overtime. Ohio State (11–1)—who did not play in the Big Ten Championship Game due to a loss to eventual Big Ten champion Michigan—was also selected, ahead of the ACC's Clemson (11–2) and Pac-12's Utah (10–3).

Some analysts have discussed whether the committee should have selected conference champions only.

Another critique centered around a perceived bias against smaller conferences such as the Big 12 which used to not stage a conference championship game, but reintroduced one for the 2017 season. The American Athletic Conference addressed this issue by enlisting Navy to its ranks for 2015, bringing its membership to 12 teams, which allowed it to stage a conference championship game under then-current NCAA rules. Since the 2016 season, FBS conferences have been allowed to stage football championship games even if they do not have 12 members.

There are opinions labeling the CFP system "just as" or "even more polarizing" than the BCS or the old wire-service poll system. However, most in sports media believe the College Football Playoff Committee got the right foursome for the 2017–18 playoff, for example, for advancing Alabama, a one-loss team excluded from its conference championship on a tiebreaker, instead of Ohio State, a two-loss conference champion.

In 2019, Urban Meyer, head coach of the national champion 2014 Ohio State Buckeyes football team, said that he intentionally ran up the score against Wisconsin in the Big Ten Championship Game to help his team be chosen for the playoff. Criticizing the subjectivity of the selection process, Meyer said that he left the starting lineup in the game despite Ohio State being ahead 45–0 in the third quarter—not resting the starters and risking their health, and poor sportsmanship—because "I don't think the 'eye test' and 'people think' is going to get enough to bump TCU and Baylor". He continued, "I had a job to do, and that was to get Ohio State in the playoff. Do I think that's right? That's wrong", proposing a selection system based on defined criteria.

==== Group of Five controversies ====
Late in the 2020 season, which was heavily impacted by the COVID-19 pandemic, Sports Illustrated writer Pat Forde was strongly critical of the CFP committee for what he considered unfair treatment of teams outside the Power Five conferences; he noted that the Big 12's Iowa State, at 8–2, were ranked No. 7, one spot ahead of the top team from the Group of Five conferences, the American Athletic Conference (AAC)'s then-unbeaten Cincinnati, and twelve spots ahead of the Sun Belt's Louisiana, a team who had beaten Iowa State by 17 points and whose only loss to that point had been in a conference game against unbeaten Coastal Carolina. Michael Aresco, commissioner of the AAC, had equally pointed criticism, accusing the committee of "undermining its credibility with rankings that defy logic and common sense and fairness," and said that he would much prefer the computer-calculated BCS rankings system." No Group of Five team was ranked in the CFP top four until Cincinnati was fourth in the rankings released on November 23, 2021.

==== 2023 exclusion of Florida State ====
The 2023 season saw the tightest playoff race in history, with eight teams in plausible contention before the conference championship weekend. The eventual selection of the one-loss conference champions Alabama (SEC) and Texas (Big 12) was controversial as both teams were selected ahead of unbeaten ACC champion Florida State; prior to 2023, no undefeated Power Five champion had failed to be selected for the playoff. ACC commissioner Jim Phillips called the decision "unfathomable" due to the significance the committee had previously afforded to undefeated conference champions, and Seminoles coach Mike Norvell said he was "disgusted and infuriated" at the decision. CFP committee chair Boo Corrigan cited the late-season injury of Florida State's quarterback Jordan Travis as a reason to rank both Alabama and Texas over Florida State.

Others also criticized the decision to exclude Georgia from the playoff. Georgia entered the conference championship weekend with a 12–0 record and ranked No. 1 in the CFP rankings up to that point. However, after narrowly losing the SEC Championship Game to No. 8 Alabama, Georgia was dropped to No. 6 in the rankings and excluded from the playoff entirely.

==== 2025 Miami–Notre Dame controversy ====
The 2025 season (the second under the 12-team playoff format) saw considerable controversy regarding the final at-large playoff spot. Entering conference championship weekend, the December 2 committee rankings placed Notre Dame at No. 10 and Miami at No. 12, with both teams sharing an identical 10–2 record. The ranking of Notre Dame above Miami was criticized, as Miami had defeated Notre Dame in Week 1 of that season, 27–24. Further controversy ensued when, at the official December 7 reveal of the CFP bracket, Miami was ranked ahead of Notre Dame to claim the final at-large bid despite both teams being idle since the December 2 rankings reveal (Miami failed to qualify for the ACC Championship Game, and Notre Dame is independent). Following the December 7 selection reveal, committee chair Hunter Yurachek explained that because BYU (ranked No. 11 in the December 2 rankings) had lost the Big 12 Championship Game that weekend, it warranted them to switch ranks with Miami. Then, when comparing Miami directly under Notre Dame in the rankings, the decision was made to switch the teams' ranks due to Miami's head-to-head advantage over Notre Dame.

Further controversy ensued when compared to the ranking of Alabama. In both the November 18 and 25 rankings, Notre Dame and Alabama had been ranked No. 9 and No. 10, respectively. In the December 2 rankings, the two teams switched ranks despite both having won the weekend prior and having an identical 10–2 record. Notre Dame head coach Marcus Freeman publicly voiced displeasure about the ranking switch. Alabama went on to qualify for the SEC Championship Game, where they lost to No. 3 Georgia, 28–7. Despite this, Alabama remained at No. 9 in the December 7 rankings and secured the second-to-last at-large bid in the playoff. This was criticized when compared to BYU, who similarly lost their conference championship game and subsequently dropped one spot in the rankings to fall below Miami, who was idle. However, Hunter Yurachek explained that Alabama's highly-ranked strength of schedule and prior win over Georgia in the regular season allowed them to be able to remain in the playoff picture.

=== 24-team format ===
The decision to expand to a 24-team playoff, along with the stipulation that conference championship games in the power conferences would be eliminated, was met with widespread criticism from fans and analysts. Many believe the expanded playoff will diminish the importance of the regular season, and, at the same time, would diminish the importance of being selected to the playoff as a whole. Former coach and ESPN College Gameday analyst Nick Saban criticized the new format, saying "There's not 24 teams in the country that can win the national championship...so, what is the reason to actually do it?" College football commentator Josh Pate called the new format "garbage". In the first edition of ESPN College Gameday following the announcement of a handshake agreement to expand, fans situated behind the stage heavily booed as the analysts discussed the new format. In a press call following the expansion announcement, CFP director Rich Clark stated: "We're aware of the fan sentiment and that many fans aren't in favor of expansion, but that was certainly weighed into the decision...We did take into account their sentiment, and that was rolled into this decision, but we decided to move forward with it."

=== Selection committee ===
The qualifications of selection committee members have also been scrutinized. As an outsider to the sports world, Condoleezza Rice's selection was the focus of some criticism. Former Clemson head coach Tommy Bowden expressed the opinion that the committee's members should be "people who played the game and preferably coached the game". Former Auburn head coach Pat Dye said, "All she knows about football is what somebody told her...or what she read in a book, or what she saw on television. To understand football, you've got to play with your hand in the dirt". Former Big East commissioner Mike Tranghese also gained membership on the selection committee despite having never played football in college. Former sportswriter Steve Weiberg and retired U.S. Air Force General Michael Gould are other committee members without significant football playing, coaching, or administrative experience.

=== Scheduling ===
==== New Year's Eve games ====
The semifinal games for the 2015 season were scheduled for December 31; they were expected to have lower television viewership because the date is not a federal holiday, and because the second game faced heavy competition for television viewers in primetime from New Year's Eve specials (such as New Year's Rockin' Eve, which is aired by ESPN's sister broadcast network ABC). Under television contracts with ESPN that predate the College Football Playoff, both the Rose and Sugar Bowl games are guaranteed exclusive TV time slots on January 1 (or January 2 if New Year's Day falls on a Sunday), regardless of whether they are hosting a semifinal game. In an interview with CBS Sports, CFP commissioner Bill Hancock suggested this scheduling issue would "change the paradigm of what New Year's Eve is all about," opining that "if you're hosting a New Year's Eve party, you better have a bunch of televisions around". Although ESPN proposed moving the Thursday, December 31, 2015, semifinal games to Saturday, January 2, 2016, the idea was rejected. The semifinal games' ratings were ultimately down significantly from those of the previous season.

In an effort to reduce the impact of their New Year's Eve scheduling, the 2016 semifinal games, which fell on a Saturday, had earlier kickoff times, at 3:00 p.m. and 7:00 p.m. ET respectively. The 2016 Orange Bowl was played in primetime on December 30, 2016, rather than in an early afternoon window on New Year's Eve. Hancock considered the earlier start times to be a compromise to reduce the games' intrusion into New Year's Eve festivities, but reiterated that there were no plans to move the semi-final games from New Year's Eve outside of years where they are hosted by the Rose Bowl and Sugar Bowl.

On July 28, 2016, however, Hancock reversed this stance and announced revisions to the scheduling for future College Football Playoff semi-final games. The games were rescheduled so that they will not necessarily be played on New Year's Eve yearly: outside of years when they are hosted by the Rose and Sugar Bowls (where they retain their traditional New Year's Day scheduling), they will now be scheduled primarily on the last Saturday or federally observed holiday of the year. In some years, this date will land on New Year's Eve. In 2021, the games were played on Friday, December 31, because the day was observed as a holiday. Viewership of the 2018 semi-finals were down by 25% over the previous semi-finals, which were played on New Year's Day.

==== Saturday first-round games ====
During the first season of the 12-team format, three of the first-round games were scheduled on Saturday, December 21, 2024, when the National Football League (NFL) traditionally holds late December Saturday games. As part of the NFL's antitrust exemption under the Sports Broadcasting Act of 1961, the league is only restricted from playing Saturday games from the second Saturday in September to the second Saturday in December to avoid competing with college football's regular season. With no such antitrust restriction in place to avoid conflicting with college football's postseason, NFL officials met with CFP officials and conference commissioners to suggest that they hold weeknight doubleheaders instead. Rejecting the NFL's suggestion, a CFP tripleheader was scheduled anyway, with the first two games going head-to-head with an NFL doubleheader. The NFL games, which aired on network TV, drew a larger audience over the CFP games, which aired on cable.

== See also ==
- List of college bowl games
