= 2021 Orange Bowl (December) =

College Football Playoff Semifinal bowl game

2021 Capital One Orange Bowl
- College Football Playoff Semifinal; 88th Orange Bowl
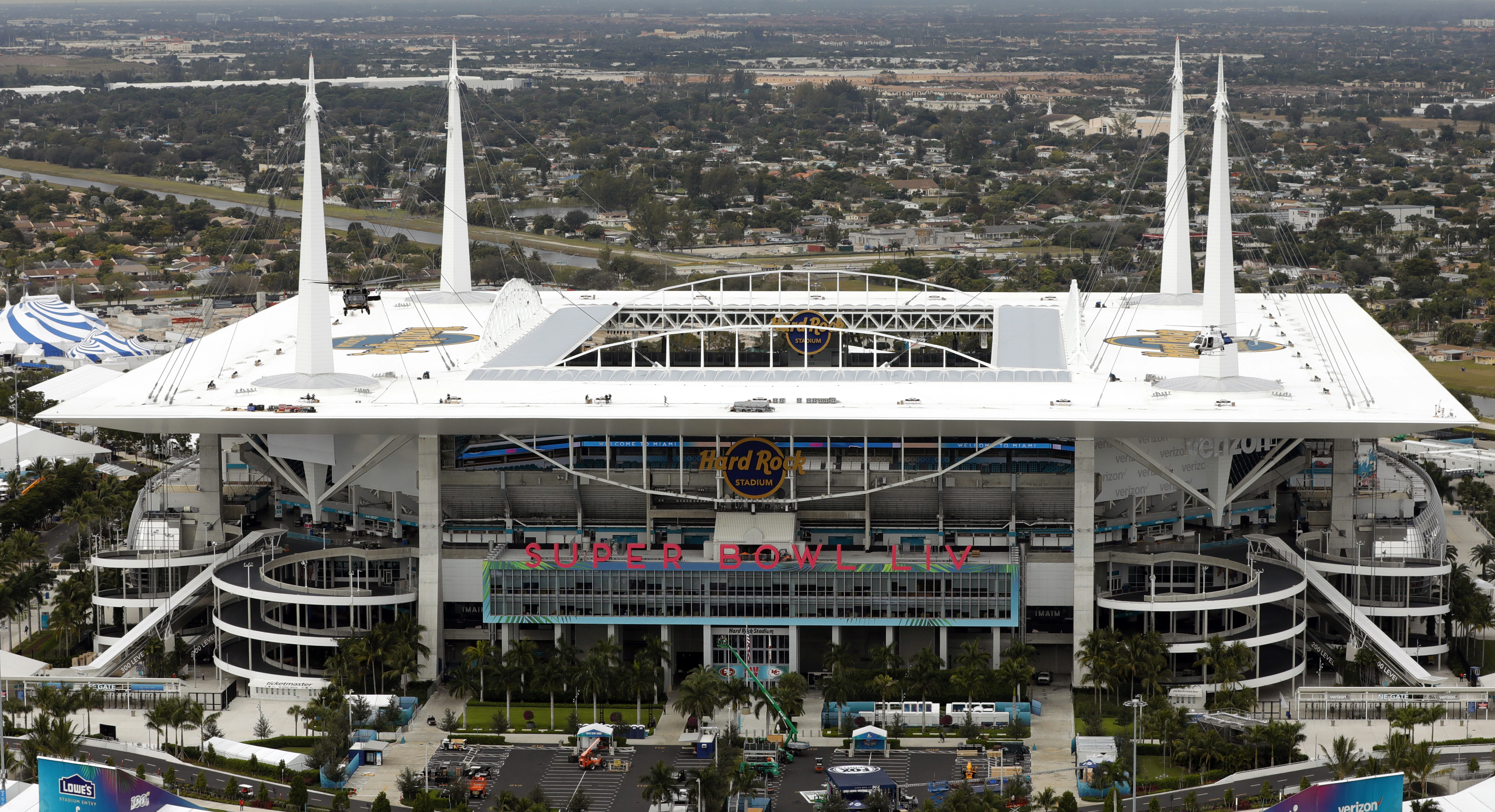
- Hard Rock Stadium in Miami Gardens, Florida, hosted the Orange Bowl.
| Georgia Bulldogs | Michigan Wolverines |
| (12–1) | (12–1) |
| SEC | Big Ten |
| 34 | 11 |
| Head coach: Kirby Smart | Head coach: Jim Harbaugh |
| AP / Coaches / CFP; 3 / 3 / 3 | AP / Coaches / CFP; 2 / 2 / 2 |
| | 1 | 2 | 3 | 4 | Total |
|---|---|---|---|---|---|
| Georgia | 14 | 13 | 0 | 7 | 34 |
| Michigan | 0 | 3 | 0 | 8 | 11 |
- Date: December 31, 2021
- Season: 2021
- Stadium: Hard Rock Stadium
- Location: Miami Gardens, Florida
- MVP: Stetson Bennett (QB, Georgia) & Derion Kendrick (CB, Georgia)
- Favorite: Georgia by 7½
- National anthem: Sgt. Liz Bremer
- Referee: Scott Campbell (Big 12)
- Attendance: 66,839

United States TV coverage
- Network: ESPN; ESPN Radio
- Announcers: ESPN: Chris Fowler (play-by-play), Kirk Herbstreit (analyst), Holly Rowe and Marty Smith (sidelines); ESPN Radio: Mark Jones (play-by-play), Robert Griffin III (analyst), and Quint Kessenich (sideline)
- Nielsen ratings: 17.2 million viewers

The 2021 Orange Bowl was a college football bowl game played on December 31, 2021, at Hard Rock Stadium in Miami Gardens, Florida. It was the 88th edition of the Orange Bowl and the second of two College Football Playoff semifinal games, the game featured two of the four teams selected by the College Football Playoff Selection Committee— The No. 2 Michigan Wolverines from the Big Ten Conference and the No. 3 Georgia Bulldogs from Southeastern Conference, with the winner of the game advancing to face the winner of the Cotton Bowl, Alabama, in the 2022 College Football Playoff National Championship, which is at Lucas Oil Stadium in Indianapolis. The game began at 7:30 p.m. EST and aired on ESPN. The game was one of the 2021–22 bowl games concluding the 2021 FBS football season. Sponsored by bank holding company Capital One, the game was officially known as the College Football Playoff Semifinal at the Capital One Orange Bowl.

== College Football Playoff ==
Semifinals
December 31 – Cotton Bowl Classic AT&T Stadium, Arlington
1 | Alabama | 27
4 | Cincinnati | 6
December 31 – Orange Bowl Hard Rock Stadium, Miami Gardens
2 | Michigan | 11
3 | Georgia | 34

Championship
January 10 – National Championship Lucas Oil Stadium, Indianapolis
1 | Alabama | 18
3 | Georgia | 33

== Teams ==
This was the third meeting between the programs; they had last met in 1965 in a game won by Georgia, 15–7. The series was tied 1–1. After the game, Georgia leads the series 2–1.

=== Georgia Bulldogs ===
Led by sixth-year head coach Kirby Smart, the fifth-ranked Bulldogs began their season with a matchup against No. 3 Clemson in the Duke's Mayo Classic. The game, which hosted College GameDay earlier that morning, played out to a low-scoring 10–3 Georgia win, putting them in the No. 2 spot in the rankings just one week into the season. The Bulldogs put on a dominant performance in their home opener the next week, as they scored eight touchdowns and allowed just one in a victory over UAB, and soundly defeated South Carolina the following week to open SEC play. Back-to-back shutouts followed, as the Bulldogs kept both Vanderbilt and No. 8 Arkansas off the scoreboard, while scoring 62 and 37 points of their own, respectively. Georgia continued their form with two more wins against ranked opponents, as they defeated No. 18 Auburn on the road and No. 11 Kentucky at home; the former game saw Georgia play as the No. 1 team in the nation for the first time this season following Texas A&M's upset of then-No. 1 Alabama, and the latter game was the first in which Georgia allowed more than one touchdown. The Bulldogs returned to neutral site play when they faced Florida following a bye week; they defeated the Gators 34–7, with their three touchdowns in just over three minutes at the end of the game's second quarter contributing to the win. This was also the week that Georgia clinched the SEC East's berth in the championship game, as a result of Kentucky's loss to Mississippi State. The Bulldogs finished their conference season in much the same style as the games before; they defeated Missouri 43–6, and allowed a season-high 17 points to Tennessee, though still managed to win by three possessions. Georgia finished the regular season with a pair of non-conference games, as they routed the Charleston Southern Buccaneers by seven scores and their rivals Georgia Tech by the same number, concluding Georgia's first undefeated regular season since 1982. The Bulldogs would lose their first game of the season in a 41–24 loss to Alabama in the SEC Championship Game, bumping them down to No. 3. They entered the game with a record of 12–1 and a 8–0 mark in conference play.

=== Michigan Wolverines ===
Seventh-year head coach Jim Harbaugh and the Michigan Wolverines began their 2021 season with a series of four straight home games at Michigan Stadium. The first, against Western Michigan, saw the Wolverines defeat the Broncos by nearly five touchdowns, before defeating Washington in a game that drew considerably less hype after the Huskies' upset loss to Montana the week prior. The Wolverines earned a spot at No. 25 in the AP Poll entering their third game, a matchup with Northern Illinois, which they won handily. Michigan then claimed a close decision against Rutgers on homecoming, improving the Wolverines to 4–0 and placing them into the top 15. Entering October, the Wolverines faced their first road conference games; they first faced Wisconsin, whom they defeated by three touchdowns, and then took down Nebraska, though only by three points, thanks to a Jake Moody field goal with under two minutes remaining. This set up the Wolverines for one of the most anticipated matchups of the season so far, a rivalry faceoff between No. 6 Michigan and No. 8 Michigan State, marking the first time since 1964 that the teams had met while each in the top ten. After a back-and-forth game, the Spartans prevailed with a four-point win, handing Michigan their first loss of the season. The Wolverines were able to bounce back, as they began November with a win over Indiana, and followed it up with a road win in State College against the Penn State Nittany Lions. In their season's final road game, Michigan routed Maryland, winning by 41 points. This win put the Wolverines at the No. 5 spot in the College Football Playoff poll entering their home finale against archrivals No. 2 Ohio State. For the first time ever under Harbaugh, and the first time since 2011, the Wolverines defeated the Buckeyes and, with the victory, clinched its spot in the conference championship game with a 8–1 conference record and a head-to-head tiebreaker against Ohio State. As a result of the win, Michigan rose to No. 2 in the College Football Playoff poll entering the Big Ten Championship, behind only No. 1 Georgia. The Wolverines then defeated Iowa in the Big Ten Football Championship Game, and entered the Orange Bowl with a 12–1 record and ranked second in all major polls.

== Game summary ==
=== First half ===
Michigan won the coin toss and elected to defer. Kenny McIntosh returned Jake Moody's 59-yard kickoff for 20 yards to give Georgia the ball on their own 20-yard-line to start their first drive, which was finished with a nine-yard touchdown pass from Stetson Bennett to Brock Bowers. Michigan's first drive started after a touchback from Jake Camarda. Michigan drove into Georgia territory before being stopped on downs. Georgia capped off their next drive with a trick play touchdown, in which running back Kenny McIntosh threw an 18-yard pass to Adonai Mitchell. Michigan once again started their drive after a touchback. After converting on third down, Robert Beal Jr. sacked Cade McNamara and Michigan was forced to punt later. Georgia received the ball back at their own 25-yard-line. A pass to Brock Bowers for a loss of two yards ended the first quarter.

The second quarter started at Georgia's 32-yard-line. Georgia drove down to the Wolverines 26-yard line before being stopped on third down. Jack Podlesny then kicked a 43-yard field goal to give Georgia a 17–0 lead. On the next drive, a 42-yard pass from McNamara to Roman Wilson put the Wolverines back into Georgia territory, and they ended the drive with a Jake Moody 36-yard field goal. Georgia then countered with another field goal from Podlesny, this time from 28 yards. After Georgia's defense forced Michigan into a quick, three-play three-and-out, Bennett found Jermaine Burton for a 57-yard touchdown pass to extend Georgia's lead to 27–3. On the first play of Michigan's next drive, McNamara threw an interception to Derion Kendrick. However, Georgia was unable to capitalize on the turnover, and an incomplete pass intended for Zamir White ended the first half, with Georgia leading 27–3.

=== Scoring summary ===
College Football Playoff Semifinal at the 2021 Capital One Orange Bowl

| Quarter | 1 | 2 | 3 | 4 | Total |
|---|---|---|---|---|---|
| No. 3 Georgia | 14 | 13 | 0 | 7 | 34 |
| No. 2 Michigan | 0 | 3 | 0 | 8 | 11 |

at Hard Rock Stadium • Miami Gardens, Florida

- Date: Friday, December 31, 2021
- Game time: 7:30 p.m. EST
- Game weather: Sunny • Temperature: 77 °F (25 °C) • Wind: 7 mph (11 km/h) SE
- Game attendance: 66,839
- Referee: Scott Campbell
- TV announcers (ESPN): Chris Fowler (play-by-play), Kirk Herbstreit (analyst), Holly Rowe and Marty Smith (sidelines)
- Box score

Scoring summary

| Quarter | Time | Drive | | | Team | Scoring information | Score | |
| Quarter | Time | Plays | Yards | TOP | Team | Scoring information | Georgia | Michigan |
|---|---|---|---|---|---|---|---|---|
| 1 | 10:49 | 7 | 80 | 4:11 | Georgia | Brock Bowers 9-yard touchdown reception from Stetson Bennett, Jack Podlesny kick good | 7 | 0 |
| 1 | 4:41 | 6 | 59 | 3:18 | Georgia | Adonai Mitchell 18-yard touchdown reception from Kenny McIntosh, Jack Podlesny kick good | 14 | 0 |
| 2 | 12:26 | 11 | 49 | 3:44 | Georgia | 43-yard field goal by Jack Podlesny | 17 | 0 |
| 2 | 7:16 | 9 | 57 | 5:10 | Michigan | 36-yard field goal by Jake Moody | 17 | 3 |
| 2 | 3:50 | 7 | 64 | 3:26 | Georgia | 28-yard field goal by Jack Podlesny | 20 | 3 |
| 2 | 1:38 | 3 | 69 | 0:37 | Georgia | Jermaine Burton 57-yard touchdown reception from Stetson Bennett, Jack Podlesny kick good | 27 | 3 |
| 4 | 11:11 | 6 | 59 | 3:35 | Georgia | James Cook 39-yard touchdown reception from Stetson Bennett, Jack Podlesny kick good | 34 | 3 |
| 4 | 4:25 | 2 | 50 | 0:15 | Michigan | Andrel Anthony 35-yard touchdown reception from J. J. McCarthy, 2-point run good | 34 | 11 |
| "TOP" = time of possession. For other American football terms, see Glossary of American football. | | | | | | | 34 | 11 |

== Statistics ==
=== Team statistics ===
Team statistical comparison
| Statistic | Georgia | Michigan |
|---|---|---|
| First downs | 21 | 17 |
| First downs rushing | 12 | 6 |
| First downs passing | 9 | 9 |
| First downs penalty | 0 | 2 |
| Third down efficiency | 10–16 | 8–15 |
| Fourth down efficiency | 1–1 | 0–3 |
| Total plays–net yards | 67–518 | 63–325 |
| Rushing attempts–net yards | 35–190 | 27–88 |
| Yards per rush | 5.4 | 3.3 |
| Yards passing | 328 | 237 |
| Pass completions–attempts | 22–32 | 18–36 |
| Interceptions thrown | 0 | 2 |
| Punt returns–total yards | 0–0 | 1–16 |
| Kickoff returns–total yards | 2–25 | 0–0 |
| Punts–average yardage | 2–45.5 | 2–44.5 |
| Fumbles–lost | 0–0 | 2–1 |
| Penalties–yards | 5–73 | 4–30 |
| Time of possession | 34:15 | 25:45 |

=== Individual statistics ===
Georgia statistics
Bulldogs passing
| | C–A | Yds | TD–INT |
|---|---|---|---|
| Stetson Bennett | 20–30 | 310 | 3–0 |
| Kenny McIntosh | 1–1 | 18 | 1–0 |
Bulldogs rushing
| | Car | Yds | TD |
| Zamir White | 12 | 54 | 0 |
| Daijun Edwards | 4 | 38 | 0 |
| Stetson Bennett | 3 | 32 | 0 |
| James Cook | 6 | 32 | 0 |
| Kendall Milton | 8 | 22 | 0 |
| Ladd McConkey | 1 | 8 | 0 |
| Kenny McIntosh | 1 | 4 | 0 |
Bulldogs receiving
| | Rec | Yds | TD |
| James Cook | 4 | 109 | 1 |
| Jermaine Burton | 1 | 57 | 1 |
| Brock Bowers | 5 | 55 | 1 |
| Adonai Mitchell | 2 | 34 | 1 |
| Kendall Milton | 3 | 32 | 0 |
| Ladd McConkey | 2 | 14 | 0 |
| Zamir White | 2 | 10 | 0 |
| George Pickens | 1 | 9 | 0 |
| Kearis Jackson | 1 | 8 | 0 |

Michigan statistics
Wolverines passing
| | C–A | Yds | TD–INT |
|---|---|---|---|
| J. J. McCarthy | 7–17 | 131 | 1–0 |
| Cade McNamara | 11–19 | 106 | 0–2 |
Wolverines rushing
| | Car | Yds | TD |
| Hassan Haskins | 9 | 39 | 0 |
| J. J. McCarthy | 4 | 24 | 0 |
| Donovan Edwards | 4 | 16 | 0 |
| Blake Corum | 3 | 6 | 0 |
| Cade McNamara | 7 | −1 | 0 |
Wolverines receiving
| | Rec | Yds | TD |
| Erick All | 4 | 63 | 0 |
| Donovan Edwards | 3 | 49 | 0 |
| Roman Wilson | 1 | 42 | 0 |
| Andrel Anthony | 1 | 35 | 1 |
| Cornelius Johnson | 2 | 18 | 0 |
| Hassan Haskins | 2 | 15 | 0 |
| Mike Sainristil | 1 | 10 | 0 |
| Daylen Baldwin | 1 | 6 | 0 |
| A. J. Henning | 1 | 1 | 0 |
| Blake Corum | 2 | −2 | 0 |
