= 2022 College Football Playoff National Championship =

College football national championship game

2022 College Football Playoff National Championship presented by AT&T
- 8th College Football Playoff National Championship
Georgia Bulldogs	Alabama Crimson Tide
(13–1)	(13–1)
SEC	SEC
33	18
Head coach: Kirby Smart	Head coach: Nick Saban
AP / Coaches / CFP; 3 / 3 / 3	AP / Coaches / CFP; 1 / 1 / 1
	1	2	3	4	Total
Georgia	0	6	7	20	33
Alabama	3	6	0	9	18
- Date: January 10, 2022
- Season: 2021
- Stadium: Lucas Oil Stadium
- Location: Indianapolis, Indiana
- MVP: Stetson Bennett (Georgia, QB); Lewis Cine (Georgia, S)
- Favorite: Georgia by 3
- National anthem: Natalie Grant
- Referee: Duane Heydt (ACC)
- Halftime show: see Broadcasting
- Attendance: 68,311

United States TV coverage
- Network: ESPN
- Announcers: Chris Fowler, Kirk Herbstreit, Holly Rowe, and Molly McGrath
- Nielsen ratings: 12.1 (22.6 million viewers)

International TV coverage
- Network: ESPN Deportes; ESPN Brasil
- Announcers: ESPN Deportes: Eduardo Varela, Pablo Viruega, and Rebeca Landa; ESPN Brasil: Matheus Pinheiro, Antony Curti and Weinny Eirado

The 2022 College Football Playoff National Championship was a college football bowl game played on January 10, 2022, at Lucas Oil Stadium in Indianapolis, Indiana. The eighth College Football Playoff National Championship, the game determined the national champion of the NCAA Division I Football Bowl Subdivision (FBS) for the 2021 season. It was the final game of the 2021–22 College Football Playoff (CFP) and, aside from the all star games following after, was the culminating game of the 2021–22 bowl season. The game featured the No. 1 Alabama Crimson Tide (defending national champions and winners of the Cotton Bowl) and the No. 3 Georgia Bulldogs (winners of the Orange Bowl), both of whom represented the Southeastern Conference (SEC). The game began at 8:16 p.m. EST and was broadcast by ESPN. Sponsored by telecommunications company AT&T, the game was officially known as the 2022 College Football Playoff National Championship presented by AT&T. Georgia entered the game seeking its third national championship, while Alabama entered seeking its 19th.

The game started slow offensively, as a field goal on Alabama's opening drive proved to be the only points of the first quarter. After Georgia scored a field goal of their own to tie the game early in the second quarter, the Crimson Tide kicked two more field goals to extend their lead to six points. A Georgia field goal with just over three minutes in the first half narrowed the deficit to three points, and the game went to halftime with Alabama leading 9–6. Looking to reinstate their six-point lead early in the third, Alabama's 48-yard field goal attempt was blocked and Georgia drove down the field to take their first lead by scoring the game's first touchdown. Alabama responded with two drives (one on a recovered fumble) that saw them score a field goal and touchdown to take back the lead. Bennett would throw touchdown passes to Adonai Mitchell and Brock Bowers to give Georgia the lead. Trying to hold on to an eight-point lead with Alabama driving with less than a minute to go, Kelee Ringo intercepted a pass and ran it 79 yards to seal the game for Georgia with a touchdown. The game ended with Georgia defeating Alabama by a score of 33–18 and winning their third national championship in school history, the first since 1980.

== Background ==
This was the third of four consecutive College Football Playoff National Championship games matching the No. 3 seed and the No. 1 seed, with No. 1 LSU defeating the No. 3 Clemson Tigers 42–25 in the 2020 edition, and No. 1 Alabama defeating the No. 3 Ohio State Buckeyes 52–24 in the 2021 edition.

=== Host selection ===
On November 1, 2017, Lucas Oil Stadium in Indianapolis, Indiana, was announced as the site for the eighth College Football Playoff (CFP) National Championship. Indianapolis was the eighth different city, and the first (and to date, only) "cold-weather city", to host the College Football Playoff National Championship (after Arlington, Glendale, Tampa, Atlanta, Santa Clara, New Orleans, and Miami Gardens). Additionally, this was the first time in college football's modern history that the national championship was not won in the South or the West. The city was selected after it was invited by the College Football Playoff to bid for the event, who specifically requested that Indianapolis bid for the 2022 event. The host committee was chaired by Mark Howell, the CEO of the Indianapolis-based company Angie's List (now Angi). While this was the first college football national championship hosted by Lucas Oil Stadium, the venue has been the home stadium for the Indianapolis Colts since 2008 and has hosted the Big Ten Football Championship Game since its inception in 2011, Super Bowl XLVI in 2012, and Final Fours in 2010, 2015, and 2021.

The stadium was "cashless" for the game, as it has been since 2020, and face masks were highly recommended but were not required.

Lucas Oil Stadium arranged for the game.
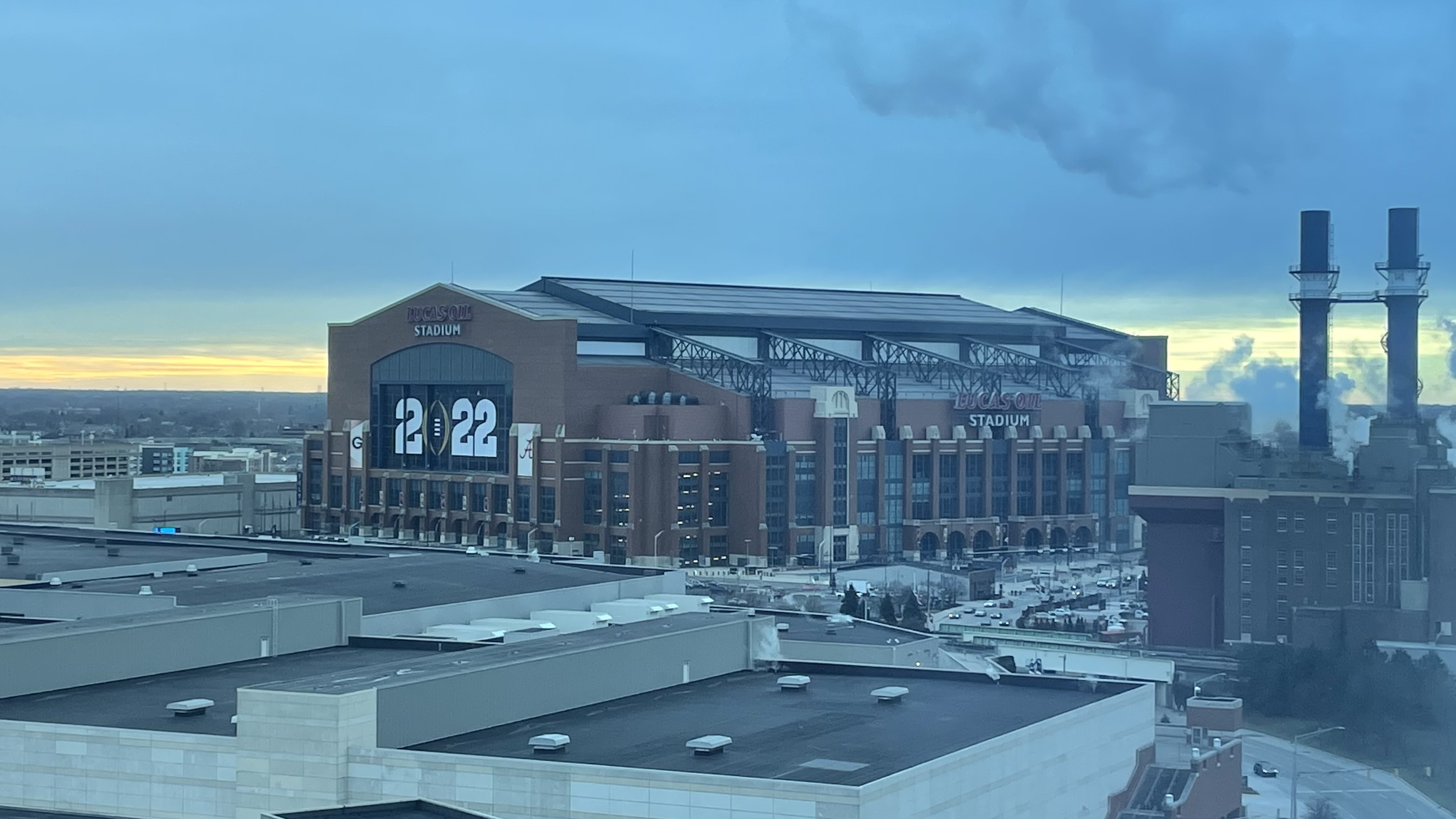
Exterior view on game day.

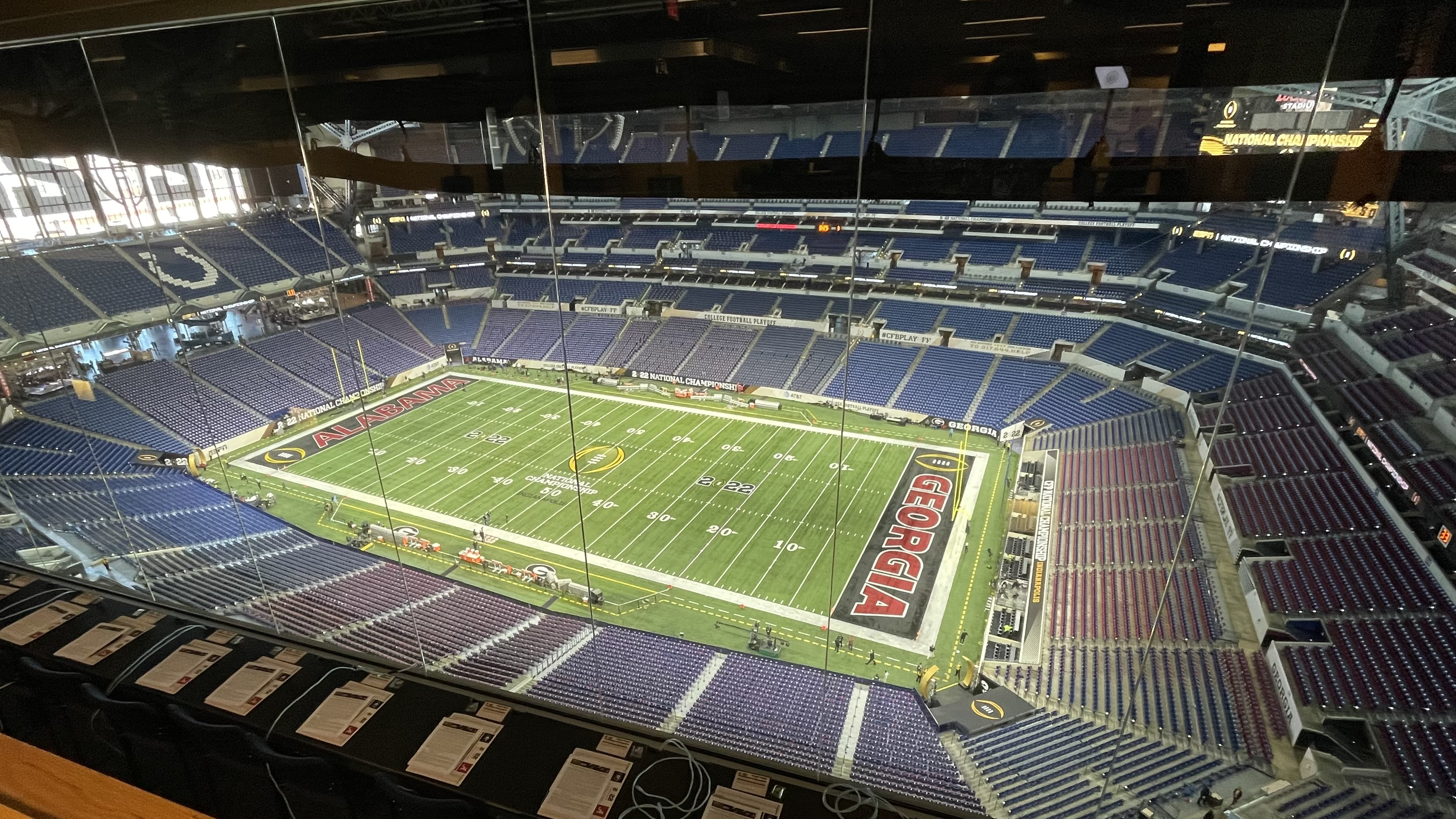
Press box view.

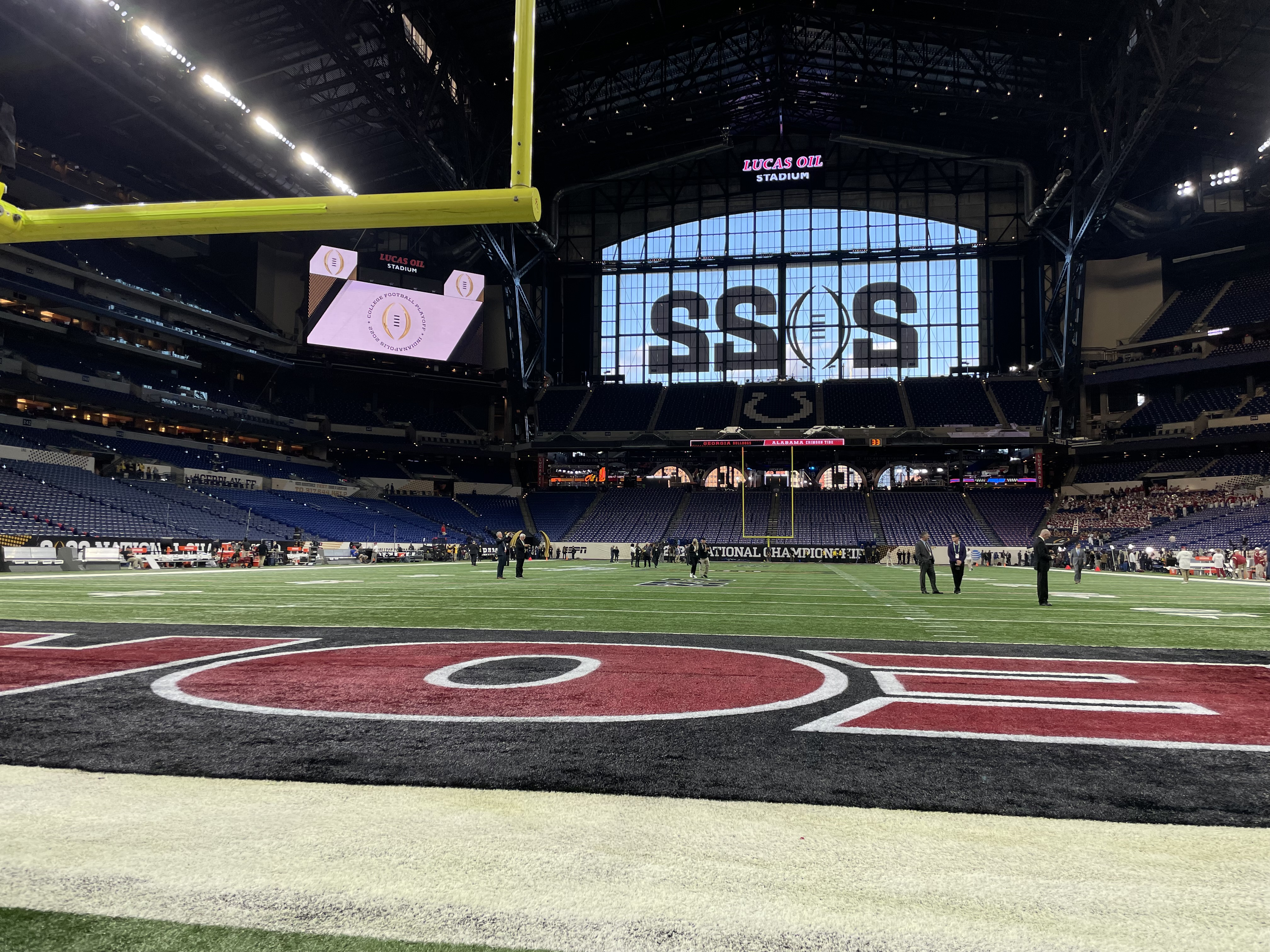
South end zone view.

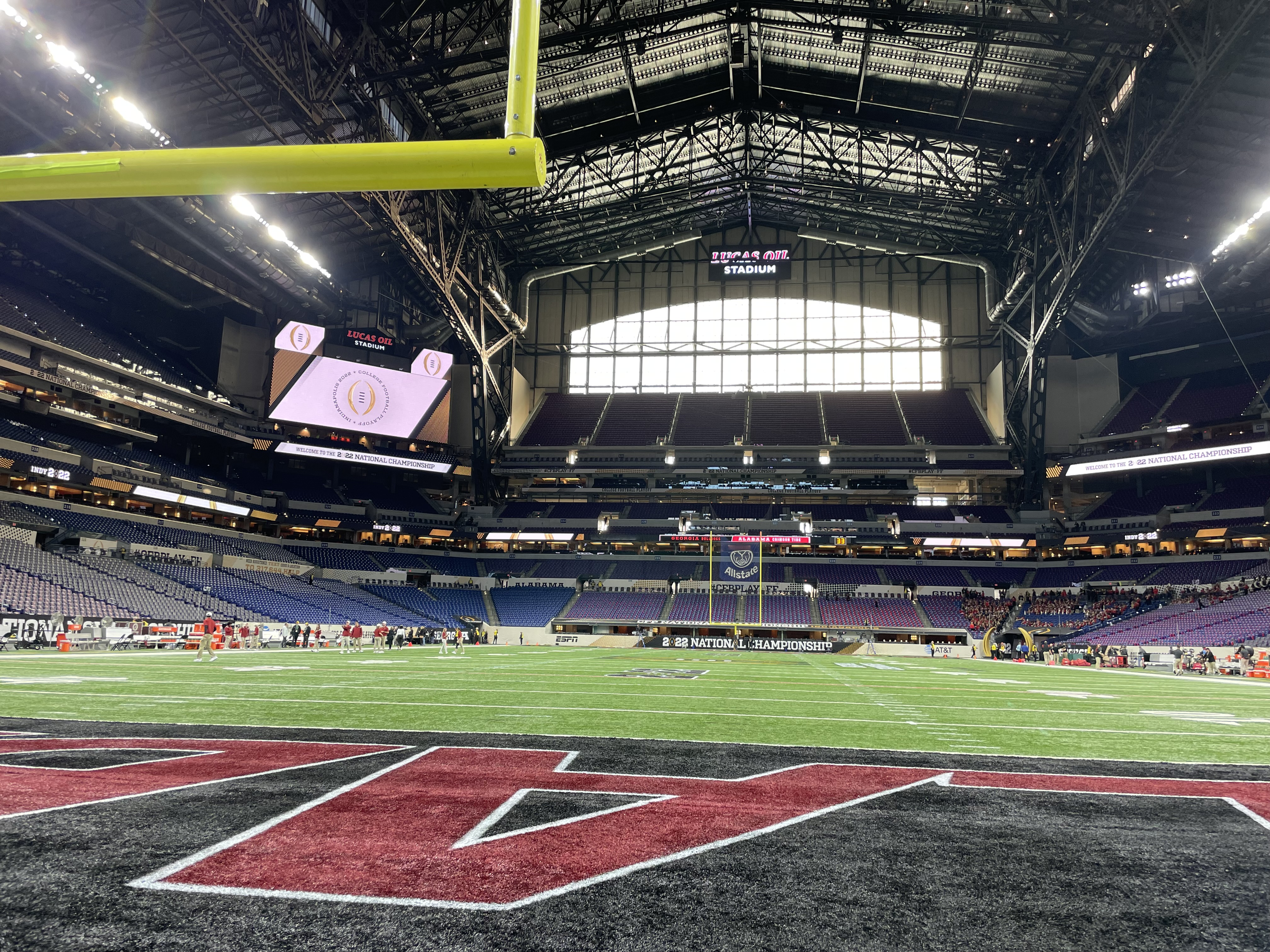
North end zone view.

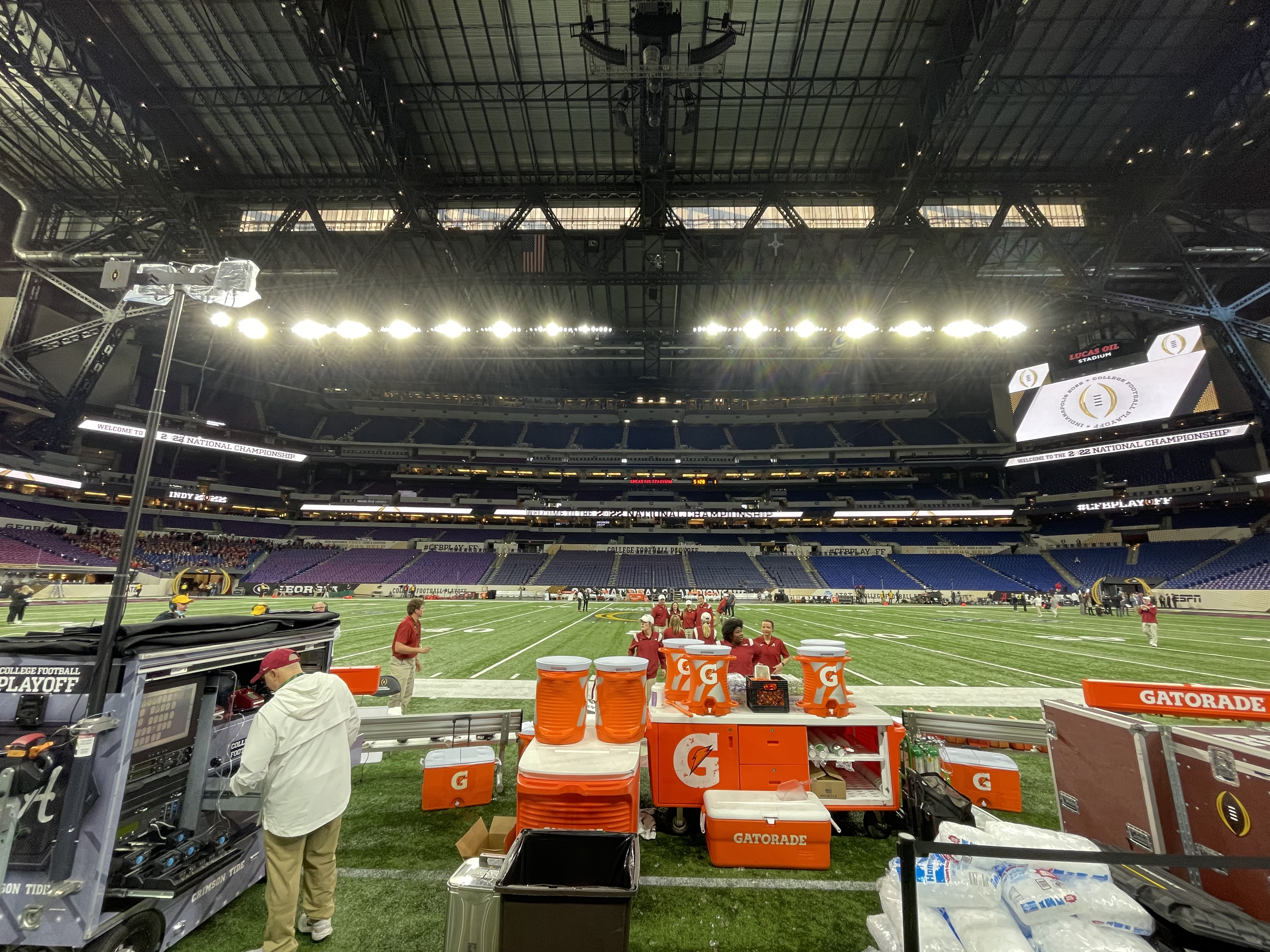
Alabama sideline view.
Photos taken pre-game.

== Teams ==
The 2022 College Football Playoff National Championship featured the No. 1 Alabama Crimson Tide and the No. 3 Georgia Bulldogs. It was the teams' 72nd meeting, with Alabama leading the series 42–25–4; they first met in 1895 and played frequently from 1901 to the mid-1970s. Alabama won the last seven meetings between the teams, with Georgia's last victory over the Tide coming in 2007. Entering the contest, the teams last met just over a month before, as Alabama defeated Georgia, 41–24, in the 2021 SEC Championship Game. This was the second time Georgia and Alabama have played for a national championship; the Crimson Tide defeated the Bulldogs in the 2018 College Football Playoff National Championship, 26–23, in overtime. Alabama entered the game holding a 4–0 postseason advantage over Georgia, having won three SEC Championship games (2012, 2018, and 2021) in addition to the aforementioned national championship game.

This was the second CFP National Championship appearance for Georgia, after losing to Alabama in the 2018 edition. The Bulldogs claimed two national championships overall; in 1942 and 1980. Alabama made their sixth CFP National Championship appearance; the Crimson Tide won titles in 2015, 2017, and 2020, and they appeared in the 2016 and 2018 title games as well. In total, Alabama claims 20 national championships, with the first in 1925.

=== Alabama ===
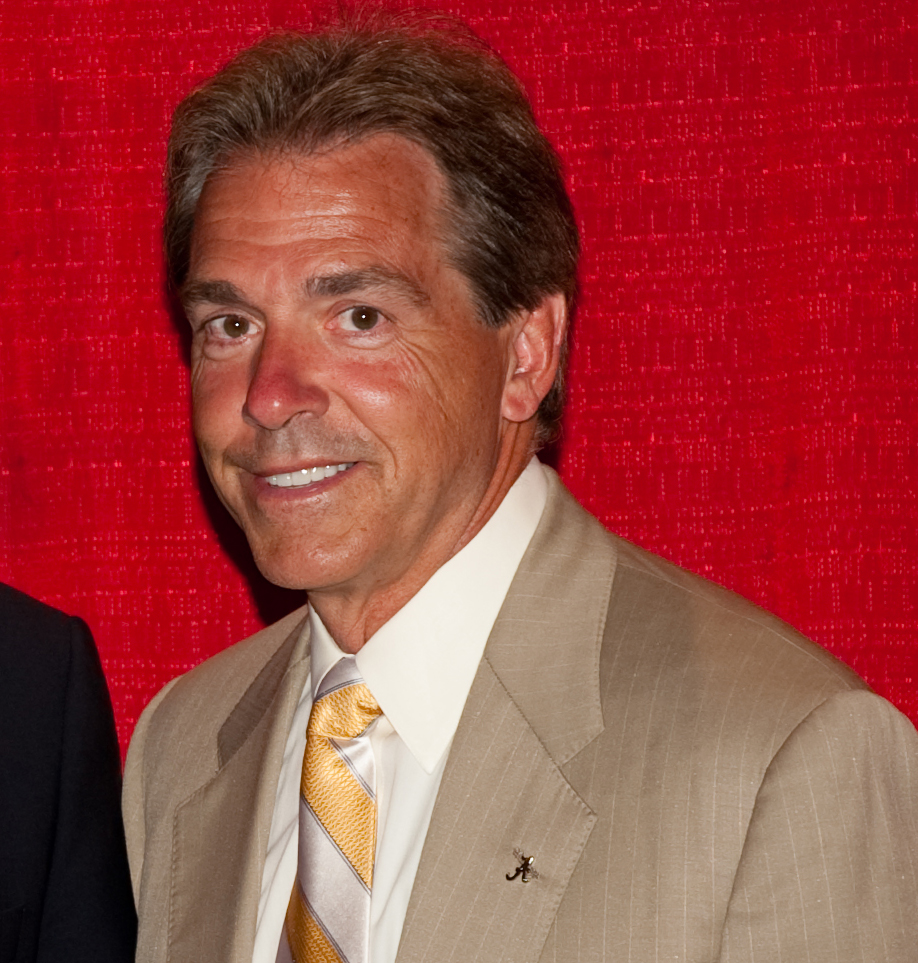
Alabama head coach Nick Saban (pictured in 2009).

The top-ranked Crimson Tide, led by 15th-year head coach Nick Saban, opened their season with a neutral site kickoff game, as they faced No. 14 Miami (FL) in the Chick-fil-A Kickoff Game. The game ended with an Alabama victory, as the Tide won convincingly to earn a 1–0 start to their national title defense. They opened their home season with a win against FCS Mercer, and followed it with their first SEC contest at No. 11 Florida, which saw Alabama escape an upset bid with a two-point win against the Gators. Alabama would rout Southern Miss the following week, in a game that featured Jameson Williams record three touchdowns of 80 yards or more, before defeating No. 12 Ole Miss by three touchdowns at home to extend their streak to six consecutive wins in that rivalry series. The Tide suffered their first and only regular season setback the following week, when they were upset by Texas A&M in College Station thanks to Seth Small's 28-yard field goal as time expired, which gave the Aggies a three-point victory. This loss snapped a 19-game winning streak for the Tide and dropped Alabama to No. 5 in the AP Poll, though they were able to rebound with impressive wins over Mississippi State and Tennessee to put their record at 7–1 entering their bye week. To begin the month of November, the Crimson Tide hosted LSU, whom they defeated by six points; Alabama then defeated New Mexico State, their final non-conference opponent, by a score of 59–3. The Tide's final home game came against No. 21 Arkansas; Alabama won by only a touchdown despite quarterback Bryce Young's school-record 559 passing yards, and the Tide dropped to No. 3 in the College Football Playoff rankings. With the win, Alabama clinched the SEC West Division title and their spot in the SEC Championship Game. The Crimson Tide concluded their regular season a week later with an Iron Bowl matchup against Auburn. The game went to four overtimes before Alabama came away with a two-point victory; this was the first game in Iron Bowl history to reach overtime. The Crimson Tide then defeated No. 1 Georgia in the 2021 SEC Championship Game, bumping them back to No. 1 and earning them a place in the playoff. Alabama defeated No. 4 Cincinnati in their semifinal matchup at the 2021 Cotton Bowl Classic, earning them a championship game berth, and ensuring that no team finishing the season unbeaten. They entered the game with a record of 13–1 and a 7–1 mark in conference play.

=== Georgia ===
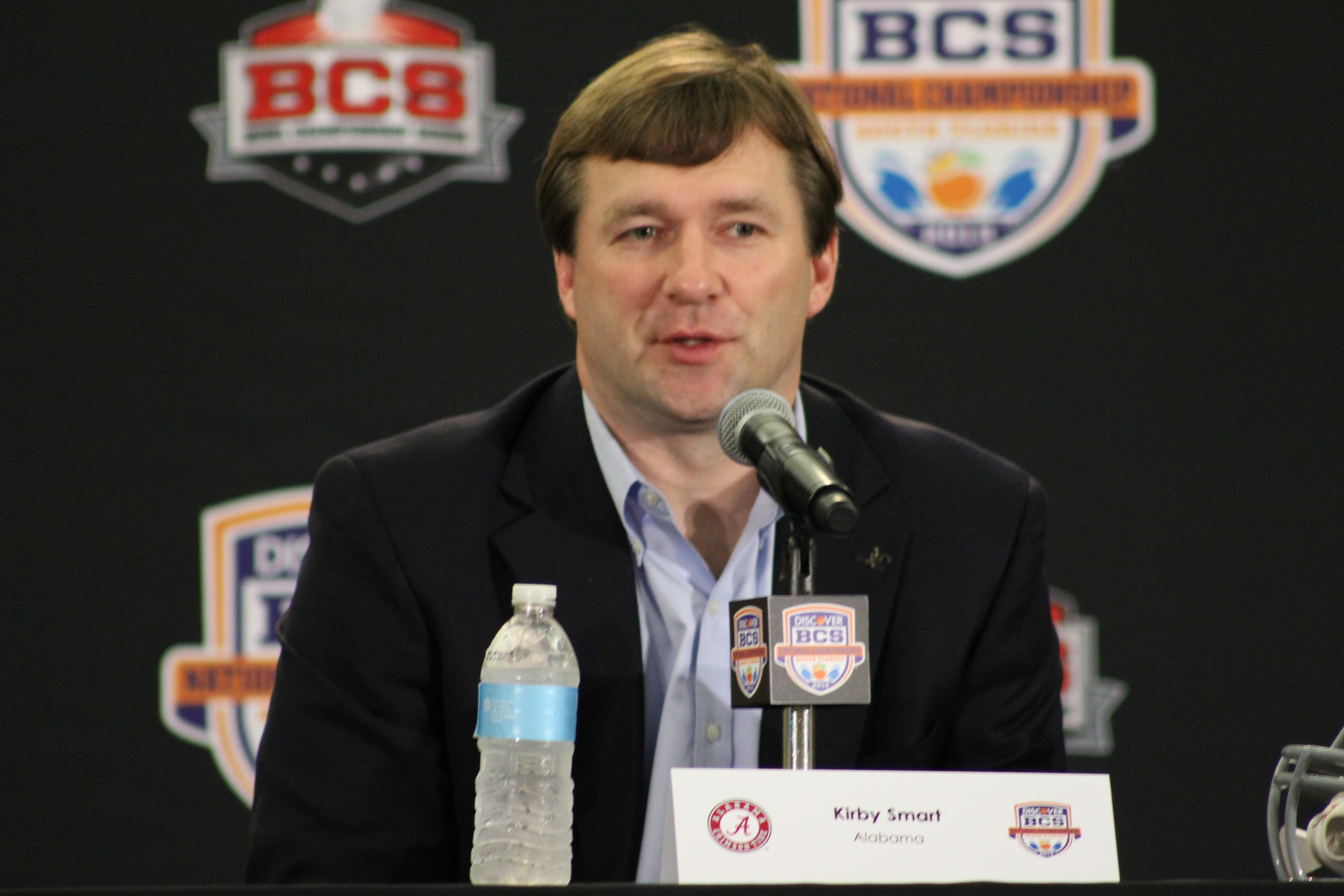
Georgia head coach Kirby Smart (pictured in 2013).

Led by sixth-year head coach Kirby Smart, the fifth-ranked Bulldogs began their season with a matchup against No. 3 Clemson in the Duke's Mayo Classic. The game, which hosted College GameDay earlier that morning, played out to a low-scoring 10–3 Georgia win, putting them in the No. 2 spot in the rankings just one week into the season. The Bulldogs put on a dominant performance in their home opener the next week, as they scored eight touchdowns and allowed just one in a victory over UAB, and soundly defeated South Carolina the following week to open SEC play. Back-to-back shutouts followed, as the Bulldogs kept both Vanderbilt and No. 8 Arkansas off the scoreboard, while scoring 62 and 37 points of their own, respectively. Georgia continued their form with two more wins against ranked opponents, as they defeated No. 18 Auburn on the road and No. 11 Kentucky at home; the former game saw Georgia play as the No. 1 team in the nation for the first time this season following Texas A&M's upset of then-No. 1 Alabama, and the latter game was the first in which Georgia allowed more than one touchdown. The Bulldogs returned to neutral site play when they faced Florida following a bye week; they defeated the Gators 34–7, with their three touchdowns in just over three minutes at the end of the game's second quarter contributing to the win. This was also the week that Georgia clinched the SEC East's berth in the championship game, as a result of Kentucky's loss to Mississippi State. The Bulldogs finished their conference season in much the same style as the games before; they defeated Missouri 43–6, and allowed a season-high 17 points to Tennessee, though still managed to win by three possessions. Georgia finished the regular season with a pair of non-conference games, as they routed the Charleston Southern Buccaneers by seven scores and their rivals Georgia Tech by the same number, concluding Georgia's first undefeated regular season since 1982. The Bulldogs fell to No. 3 Alabama in the SEC Championship Game; Georgia subsequently dropped to No. 3 and were selected for the College Football Playoff. They were picked to face No. 2 Michigan in the Orange Bowl, where they won to earn their spot in the championship game. Georgia entered the contest with a record of 13–1 and an 8–0 mark in SEC play.

== Starting lineups ==
Georgia	Position		Alabama
Offense
Adonai Mitchell 2	WR		† Jameson Williams 1
Jermaine Burton 3	WR		Ja'Corey Brooks
Jamaree Salyer 6	LT		† Evan Neal 1
Justin Shaffer 6	LG		Javion Cohen
Sedrick Van Pran-Granger 5	C		Seth McLaughlin
Warren Ericson	RG		Emil Ekiyor Jr.
Warren McClendon 5	RT		Chris Owens
Darnell Washington 3	TE		Cameron Latu 3
† Brock Bowers 1	TE	WR	Slade Bolden
Stetson Bennett 4	QB		† Bryce Young 1
Zamir White 4	RB		Brian Robinson Jr. 3
Defense
Travon Walker 1	DE		Phidarian Mathis 2
† Jordan Davis 1	NG		D. J. Dale
Devonte Wyatt 1	DT	DE	Byron Young 3
† Nakobe Dean 3	MAC	WILL	Christian Harris 3
Quay Walker 1	MONEY	MIKE	Henry To'oTo'o 5
Nolan Smith 1	JACK		† Will Anderson Jr. 1
Kelee Ringo 4	CB	STAR	Brian Branch 2
William Poole	CB		Kool-Aid McKinstry 2
Christopher Smith 5	SS		Jordan Battle 3
† Lewis Cine 1	FS		DeMarcco Hellams 7
Derion Kendrick 6	CB		Khyree Jackson 4
† 2021 All-American
Selected in an NFL draft (number corresponds to draft round)

== Game summary ==
=== First half ===
Scheduled for an 8:00 p.m. EST start, the game began at 8:16 p.m. with Jake Camarda's opening kickoff resulting in a touchback. As a result, Alabama began their first drive at their own 25-yard-line. Brian Robinson Jr. got each of the game's first two carries, and Bryce Young completed passes to Slade Bolden and Jameson Williams to get first downs on the drive. Driving to the Georgia 19-yard-line, Young's pass was incomplete, forcing a 37-yard field goal attempt for Alabama, which was made by Will Reichard. Alabama's defense proved to be effective on Georgia's first drive of the game, as Christian Harris took down Stetson Bennett for a 14-yard sack; despite a 14-yard rush by Bennett a few plays later, a delay of game penalty doomed the Bulldogs to a three-and-out, and Camarda punted the ball away. The kick was fair caught by Bolden at the Alabama 20-yard line. On the second play of their ensuing drive, Young found Williams for a 15-yard gain and a first down, which would be their only first down of the drive. The Tide offense stalled and James Burnip's punt was fair caught by Kearis Jackson at the Georgia 25-yard-line. Georgia's offense was again unable to move the ball, as they gained one yard on three plays and punted the ball back to Alabama, who took possession at their own 45-yard-line after Ameer Speed was called for a kick catch interference penalty. Alabama also found themselves unable to gain a first down, and they were forced to punt the ball back to the Bulldogs four plays later after their first three-and-out of the game. Burnip's kick was caught by Jackson at the Georgia 8-yard-line. After a personal foul set Georgia back to their own 4-yard-line on their first play, the Bulldogs were able to get a first down for the first time on a 19-yard pass from Bennett to Darnell Washington, which was immediately followed by a 52-yard pass from Bennett to George Pickens, which put Georgia in Alabama territory for the first time. They advanced the ball to the Alabama 23-yard-line before the first quarter came to an end.

Facing a 2nd & 14 to begin the second quarter, the Bulldogs picked up a first down within two plays, and advanced the ball down to the Alabama 5-yard-line before bringing up 4th & Goal. Jack Podlesny's 24-yard field goal attempt was successful, giving Georgia their first points of the contest and tying the game at three points apiece. Alabama began their next drive at their own 25-yard-line following a touchback; their first play was a 40-yard pass from Young to Williams, though Williams went down with a non-contact injury to his left knee and left the game following that play. Young completed several more short passes on the drive but could not pick up another first down, and Alabama retook the lead on a 45-yard Will Reichard field goal with just over eleven minutes to play. Georgia started their next drive at their own 15-yard-line following a false start penalty and was unable to get past their own 22-yard-line; Camarda's punt on 4th & 8 was muffed by Bolden, who then recovered the ball back at the Alabama 26-yard-line. The first play of the drive went for a 5-yard gain, but the following play was a 61-yard completion from Young to Cameron Latu, which put Alabama on the Georgia 8-yard-line. However, Alabama's offense stalled, gaining two yards on the next two plays and then losing 13 on a sack by Channing Tindall, forcing a field goal try. Reichard's 37-yard kick was good, giving Alabama a six-point lead. After getting the ball back with seven minutes to play, Georgia reached Alabama territory in four plays, and converted a third down with a pass from Bennett to Adonai Mitchell on the next play. A sack by Dallas Turner on the following play set Georgia behind the sticks and they were ultimately not able to recover; Jack Podlesny converted a 49-yard field goal on 4th & 6, narrowing the margin to three. Alabama's final possession of the half started on their own 25-yard-line; a 24-yard pass from Young to Agiye Hall put the Tide in Georgia territory, but a pair of incompletions from Young made it fourth down. Burnip was sent back on to punt, and the kick was fair caught at the Georgia 10-yard-line. Looking to run out the clock, Zamir White ran the ball three straight times for a net total of 15 yards, which concluded the second quarter. Alabama entered halftime leading the game, 9–6.

=== Second half ===
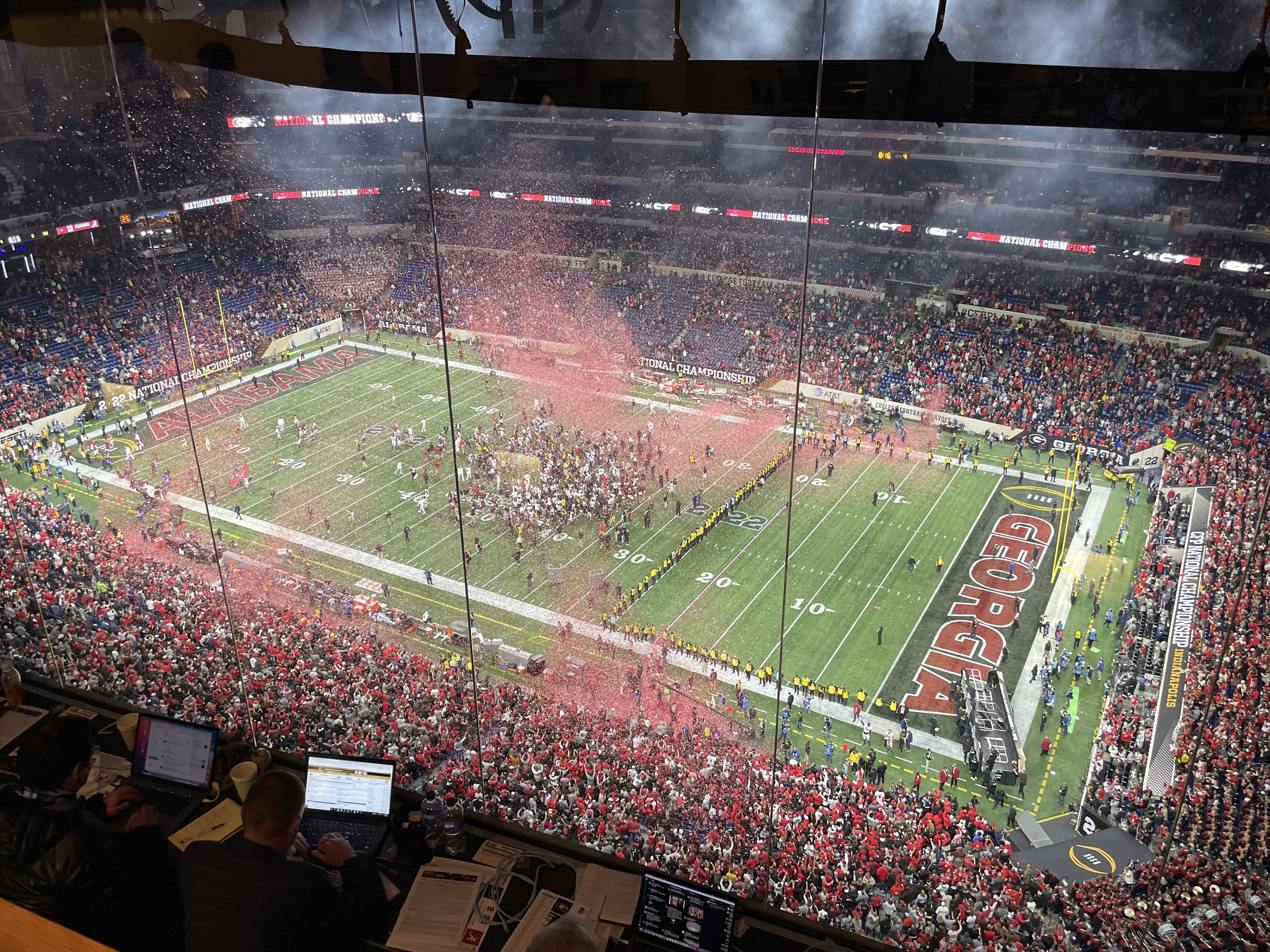
Confetti flies after Georgia finalizes its win in the title game.

Georgia began the third quarter with possession of the ball, with Reichard's kickoff going out for a touchback. Zamir White carried the ball for 11 yards on the half's first play, and then again for 19 yards on the following play, earning a first down each time. An intentional grounding penalty called on Bennett on the next play, a flea flicker, set Georgia back to 2nd & 19, and they were unable to recover. Camarda was brought on to punt on 4th & 8, and his kick was fair caught by Bolden at the Alabama 7-yard-line. Alabama's first possession of the second half was brief; Young's pass was intercepted by Christopher Smith at the Alabama 43-yard-line, giving Georgia possession again. The Bulldogs were not able to capitalize off of this miscue, as they went three-and-out, gaining only three yards. Camarda's punt was downed at the Alabama 2-yard-line. The Crimson Tide escaped the shadow of their own goalposts in a few plays; Robinson's carry for 16 yards on 2nd & 9 advanced the ball to the Alabama 19-yard-line and the Tide had another first down within two more plays. They reached Georgia territory three plays after that and got the ball to the Georgia 30-yard-line before two straight incompletions brought up 4th & 11. Reichard's field goal attempt was the first of the night to be unsuccessful, as the 48-yard try was blocked by Georgia defensive tackle Jalen Carter, giving the Bulldogs possession at their own 20-yard-line. Georgia was quick to capitalize; running back James Cook took the ball inside the Alabama red zone with a 67-yard rush, and a pair of rushes from Bennett and Kenny McIntosh afterwards advanced the ball to the Alabama 1-yard-line. On 1st & Goal, Zamir White scored the game's first touchdown, a one-yard rush, giving Georgia their first lead of the game. Getting possession of the ball back at their own 25-yard-line, Alabama ran three plays to advance to their own 41-yard-line before the end of the third quarter.

Alabama began the fourth quarter with a seven-yard pass from Young to Bolden; a hands to the face penalty called on the Bulldogs' Robert Beal Jr. gave the Tide a first down on the following play and a 28-yard pass from Young to Hall took Alabama all the way down to the Georgia 5-yard-line. Two incompletions and a two-yard rush brought up 4th & Goal, and Reichard was brought on for another field goal attempt; this 21-yard try was good, bringing the Crimson Tide's deficit to one point. Georgia began their next drive at their own 25-yard-line after a touchback, but lost the ball shortly thereafter as a fumble by Bennett on the drive's third play was recovered at the Georgia 16-yard-line by Brian Branch. Alabama, starting their drive inside the red zone, benefitted from a roughing the passer call on second down and scored their first touchdown three plays later, as Young found Latu in the end zone for a three-yard passing touchdown. Young's rush on the two-point conversion attempt was unsuccessful, leaving Alabama's lead at five points. Beginning from a touchback, Georgia took to the passing game to move the ball on their ensuing drive. Bennett completed passes of 18 and 10 yards, with a 15-yard pass interference penalty in between, to move the ball to the Alabama 32-yard-line. Following a sack, Bennett connected with Adonai Mitchell for a 40-yard touchdown pass to the back corner of the end zone to reclaim the lead for the Bulldogs; the two-point rush by James Cook was no good, keeping Georgia's lead at one. Alabama went three-and-out on their next possession, with James Burnip's punt fair caught by Jackson at the Georgia 38-yard-line. Zamir White carried the ball on each of Georgia's next four plays, gaining two first downs, and the Bulldogs got another by virtue of a pass interference call on Kool-Aid McKinstry. Three plays later, Bennett connected with tight end Brock Bowers for a 15-yard touchdown, giving Georgia an eight-point lead. Driving with a chance to tie the game, Alabama gained a pair of first downs and reached Georgia territory in five plays, with just under a minute and a half to play. On 3rd & 10, following two incompletions, Young's pass downfield was intercepted by Kelee Ringo who returned it 79 yards for a touchdown, giving Georgia a lead of fifteen points. Getting the ball back with 54 seconds remaining, Alabama was able to string together a series of first-down passes, as Young found Ja'Corey Brooks for gains of 20 and 11 yards, respectively, but an intentional grounding penalty on Young set them back to their own 43-yard-line. A sack by Robert Beal set Alabama further back to their own 36-yard line, and the game concluded after two further plays. The game ended at 11:57 p.m., after a total of three hours and 41 minutes, with Georgia having defeated Alabama, 33–18, to win the national championship.

=== Scoring summary ===
2022 College Football Playoff National Championship Game

Quarter	1	2	3	4	Total
No. 3 Georgia	0	6	7	20	33
No. 1 Alabama	3	6	0	9	18

at Lucas Oil Stadium • Indianapolis, Indiana

- Date: January 10, 2022
- Game time: 8:16 p.m. EST
- Game weather: n/a (game played indoors)
- Game attendance: 68,311
- Referee: Duane Heydt
- TV announcers (ESPN): Chris Fowler (play-by-play), Kirk Herbstreit (analyst), Holly Rowe and Molly McGrath (sidelines)
- Box score

Scoring summary

Quarter	Time	Drive			Team	Scoring information	Score	
Quarter	Time	Plays	Yards	TOP	Team	Scoring information	Georgia	Alabama
1	9:55	14	56	5:05	Alabama	37-yard field goal by Will Reichard	0	3
2	12:35	11	87	5:51	Georgia	24-yard field goal by Jack Podlesny	3	3
2	11:12	5	47	1:23	Alabama	45-yard field goal by Will Reichard	3	6
2	7:07	6	55	2:29	Alabama	37-yard field goal by Will Reichard	3	9
2	3:09	9	34	3:58	Georgia	49-yard field goal by Jack Podlesny	6	9
3	1:20	4	80	1:58	Georgia	Zamir White 1-yard touchdown run, Jack Podlesny kick good	13	9
4	12:59	10	72	3:21	Alabama	21-yard field goal by Will Reichard	13	12
4	10:14	4	16	1:21	Alabama	Cameron Latu 3-yard touchdown reception from Bryce Young, 2-point Bryce Young run failed	13	18
4	8:09	4	75	2:05	Georgia	Adonai Mitchell 40-yard touchdown reception from Stetson Bennett, 2-point James Cook run failed	19	18
4	3:33	7	62	3:37	Georgia	Brock Bowers 15-yard touchdown reception from Stetson Bennett, Jack Podlesny kick good	26	18
4	0:54				Georgia	Interception returned 79 yards for touchdown by Kelee Ringo, Jack Podlesny kick good	33	18
"TOP" = time of possession. For other American football terms, see Glossary of American football.							33	18

== Statistics ==
Team statistical comparison
Statistic	Georgia	Alabama
First downs	20	22
First downs rushing	7	5
First downs passing	10	15
First downs penalty	3	2
Third down efficiency	4–12	9–20
Fourth down efficiency	0–0	0–1
Total plays–net yards	56–364	85–399
Rushing attempts–net yards	30–140	28–30
Yards per rush	4.7	1.1
Yards passing	224	369
Pass completions–attempts	17–26	35–57
Interceptions thrown	0	2
Punt returns–total yards	0–0	1–(−2)
Kickoff returns–total yards	1–59	0–0
Punts–total yardage	5–44.6	4–37.0
Fumbles–lost	2–1	1–0
Penalties–yards	10–70	7–44
Time of possession	28:29	31:31

Georgia statistics
Bulldogs passing
	C–A	Yds	TD–INT
Stetson Bennett	17–26	224	2–0
Bulldogs rushing
	Car	Yds	TD
Zamir White	13	84	1
James Cook	6	77	0
Kenny McIntosh	2	6	0
Ladd McConkey	1	−3	0
Stetson Bennett	8	−24	0
Bulldogs receiving
	Rec	Yds	TD
George Pickens	1	52	0
Adonai Mitchell	2	50	1
Brock Bowers	4	36	1
Jermaine Burton	2	28	0
Kenny McIntosh	3	23	0
James Cook	2	15	0
Darnell Washington	1	9	0
Kearis Jackson	1	8	0
Ladd McConkey	1	3	0

Alabama statistics
Crimson Tide passing
	C–A	Yds	TD–INT
Bryce Young	35–57	369	1–2
Crimson Tide rushing
	Car	Yds	TD
Brian Robinson Jr.	22	68	0
Trey Sanders	2	5	0
Bryce Young	4	−43	0
Crimson Tide receiving
	Rec	Yds	TD
Cameron Latu	5	102	1
Jameson Williams	4	65	0
Agiye Hall	2	52	0
Ja'Corey Brooks	6	47	0
Slade Bolden	7	44	0
Brian Robinson	4	28	0
Traeshon Holden	6	28	0
Trey Sanders	1	3	0

== Broadcasting ==
The game was televised in the United States by ESPN, with Megacast coverage across other ESPN linear channels and streaming. The network aired a world premiere of the music video for Alesso and Katy Perry's new single "When I'm Gone" during the halftime report—the first time ESPN had ever premiered a music video during live event coverage.

The ESPN Megacast coverage spanned seven networks: the main broadcast of the game was shown on ESPN, a coaches' film room broadcast featuring Texas A&M head coach Jimbo Fisher and members of his staff was broadcast on ESPN2, the "command center" broadcast aired on ESPNU, the skycam feed was broadcast on ESPNews, the Spanish language broadcast was shown on ESPN Deportes, the "hometown radio" broadcast, featuring radio announcers from both Georgia and Alabama, was shown on the SEC Network, and the national radio broadcast was on ESPN Radio. Additionally, the individual "hometown radio" broadcasts, additional skycam feeds, the "all-22" broadcast, and the halftime marching band performances were all streamed on the ESPN app.

The game was televised in Canada by TSN, which aired a simulcast of ESPN's coverage. Megacast coverage was also featured, with Skycast airing on TSN2, Command Center airing on TSN3, and Coaches Film Room airing on TSN Direct.

=== Commentary teams ===
The primary broadcast team from Saturday Night Football, Chris Fowler, Kirk Herbstreit, and Holly Rowe, served as the commentator, analyst, and sideline reporter for the main ESPN broadcast; Molly McGrath also joined the crew as a sideline reporter alongside Rowe. The commentary team on ESPN Deportes consisted of Eduardo Varela, Pablo Viruega, and Rebeca Landa. ESPN Radio's broadcast team consisted of Sean McDonough and Todd Blackledge, who shared the commentary booth for a College Football Playoff National Championship for the sixth time, as well as Ian Fitzsimmons and Kris Budden, who both reported from the sidelines. Two former referees contributed to the broadcasts as rules experts: Bill Lemonnier, a former Big Ten Conference official, was a part of the primary ESPN broadcast, and Matt Austin, a former Southeastern Conference official, contributed to the ESPN Radio broadcast.

The "Hometown Radio" feeds were presented with each team's regular radio commentary teams. The Alabama feed was commentated by Eli Gold, John Parker Wilson, and Rashad Johnson, and broadcast in conjunction with the Alabama Crimson Tide Sports Network. The Georgia feed was commentated by Scott Howard, Eric Zeier, and D. J. Shockley, and was broadcast in conjunction with the Georgia Bulldog Sports Network.

== Aftermath ==
Georgia's win marked their first national championship since 1980, a gap of 41 years. They finished the season with a record of 14–1, while Alabama finished with a 13–2 record. This was the first time a Georgia team had recorded 14 wins in a single season. Georgia quarterback Stetson Bennett, the first walk-on quarterback to defeat a team coached by Nick Saban since 1997, was named the offensive player of the game, while Georgia safety Lewis Cine was named defensive player of the game. The win was the first and only win for Georgia head coach Kirby Smart over Alabama head coach Nick Saban, for whom he worked as an assistant previously. The win was the first for Georgia against Alabama overall since the 2007 season, Saban's first at Alabama. Georgia also became the first No. 3 seed to win the College Football Playoff National Championship.

During the postgame handshake, Saban told Smart, "you guys kicked our ass in the fourth quarter," referring to Georgia's three unanswered touchdowns to conclude the game which propelled them from a five-point deficit to a fifteen-point lead. In return, Smart asked about the condition of Alabama wide receiver Jameson Williams, who left the game with an injury in the second quarter; Saban responded that Williams had likely torn his ACL.

This was the final game for Georgia defensive coordinator Dan Lanning before his departure for the head coaching position at Oregon. He was hired on December 11, 2021, but committed to coaching Georgia through the conclusion of their season. His first game at Oregon was against Georgia.

A total of 68,311 people attended the game, making it one of seven sellouts of the 2021–22 bowl game season. Both of the playoff semifinals were among the list of seven, as were the Gasparilla Bowl, Music City Bowl, Birmingham Bowl, and Rose Bowl.

Georgia went on to record an undefeated 2022 season and beat TCU in the next season's national championship 65–7 to become the first team since the 2012 Alabama Crimson Tide to repeat as national champions. This was the largest margin of victory in any bowl game in the FBS level until Georgia surpassed that the following season in the 2023 Orange Bowl against Florida State, 63–3.

Georgia's victory was the first of a 29-game winning streak, which was bookended by losses to Alabama in the 2021 SEC Championship and the 2023 SEC Championship Game; the latter was the final victory coached by Nick Saban before his retirement at the end of the 2023 college football season.

== See also ==
- Super Bowl XLVI, the NFL championship game contested at the same venue on February 5, 2012
- College football national championships in NCAA Division I FBS
- List of college football post-season games that were rematches of regular season games
