= Jermaine Burton =

American football player (born 2001)

Profile
- Position: Wide receiver

Personal information
- Born: June 28, 2001 (age 25); Atlanta, Georgia, U.S.
- Listed height: 6 ft 0 in (1.83 m)
- Listed weight: 204 lb (93 kg)

Career information
- High school: Calabasas (Calabasas, California)
- College: Georgia (2020–2021); Alabama (2022–2023)
- NFL draft: 2024: 3rd round, 80th overall pick

Career history
- Cincinnati Bengals (2024–2025)

Awards and highlights
- CFP national champion (2021)

Career NFL statistics
- Receptions: 4
- Receiving yards: 107
- Return yards: 378
- Stats at Pro Football Reference

Jermaine Demetrius Burton (born June 28, 2001) is an American professional football wide receiver. He played college football for the Georgia Bulldogs and Alabama Crimson Tide before being selected by the Cincinnati Bengals in the third round of the 2024 NFL draft.

== Early life ==
Burton attended Calabasas High School in Calabasas, California. Burton was selected to play in the 2020 Under Armour All-America Game. A four-star recruit, Burton committed to play college football at the University of Georgia.

== College career ==
As a true freshman at Georgia in 2020, Burton played in 10 games having three touchdowns and 404 yards on 27 receptions. Burton recorded a career high two touchdowns and 197 yards in a 31–24 victory over Mississippi State. As a sophomore in 2021, Burton played in 12 games tallying five touchdowns, 497 yards, and 26 receptions.

In January 2022, Burton announced he was transferring to the University of Alabama to play for the Crimson Tide. At the conclusion of the 2022 game against Tennessee, Burton struck a female Tennessee fan in the head as Tennessee fans rushed the field. He declared for the 2024 NFL Draft after leading Alabama with 798 receiving yards and eight touchdowns.

== Professional career ==
Pre-draft measurables
Height	Weight	Arm length	Hand span	40-yard dash	10-yard split	20-yard split	Vertical jump	Broad jump
6 ft 0 1/4 in (1.84 m)	196 lb (89 kg)	31 in (0.79 m)	9 7/8 in (0.25 m)	4.45 s	1.53 s	2.61 s	38.5 in (0.98 m)	11 ft 1 in (3.38 m)
All values from NFL Combine

=== Cincinnati Bengals ===
==== 2024 season ====
Burton was selected by the Cincinnati Bengals in the third round, 80th overall, of the 2024 NFL draft. He recorded his first NFL catch in the Bengals' Week 2 game against Kansas City Chiefs, for 47 yards. The Bengals would go on to lose the game 26–25. In 14 total games for Cincinnati, Burton compiled 4 receptions for 107 scoreless yards. On January 3, 2025, it was announced that Burton would not be traveling with the team to Pittsburgh to play in their season finale against the Pittsburgh Steelers due to a coach's decision.

==== 2025 season ====
On December 7, 2025, after not appearing in any of the Bengals' regular season games, Burton was suspended by the Bengals hours before their Week 14 game against the Buffalo Bills. A reason for suspension was not stated, and Burton was officially waived by the organization a day later.

== Career statistics ==
College statistics
Year	Team	Games	Receiving			
Year	Team	GP	Rec	Yards	Avg	TD
2020	Georgia	10	27	404	15.0	3
2021	Georgia	14	26	497	19.1	5
2022	Alabama	13	40	677	16.9	7
2023	Alabama	13	39	798	20.5	8
Career		50	132	2,376	18.0	23

== Personal life ==
On December 30, 2024, Burton was allegedly involved in a domestic dispute where he choked and hit his ex-girlfriend after breaking into her home.
