= Tom Burman =

American athletics administrator (born 1966)

Current position
- Title: Athletic director
- Team: Wyoming
- Conference: Mountain West

Biographical details
- Born: January 4, 1966 (age 60)
- Education: University of Wyoming; Robert Morris University

Administrative career (AD unless noted)
- 1995–2000: Wyoming (associate AD)
- 2000–2006: Portland State
- 2006–present: Wyoming

Thomas K. Burman (born January 4, 1966) is an American athletics administrator who is the current director of athletics for the University of Wyoming. He previously served as athletic director for Portland State University, and as associate athletic director for the University of Wyoming. Burman is a graduate of the University of Wyoming and Robert Morris University.
