= 2023 College Football Playoff National Championship =

Postseason college football bowl game

2023 College Football Playoff National Championship presented by AT&T
- 9th College Football Playoff National Championship
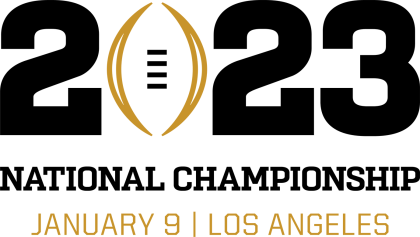
TCU Horned Frogs	Georgia Bulldogs
(13–1)	(14–0)
Big 12	SEC
7	65
Head coach: Sonny Dykes	Head coach: Kirby Smart
AP / Coaches / CFP; 3 / 4 / 3	AP / Coaches / CFP; 1 / 1 / 1
	1	2	3	4	Total
TCU	7	0	0	0	7
Georgia	17	21	14	13	65
- Date: January 9, 2023
- Season: 2022
- Stadium: SoFi Stadium
- Location: Inglewood, California
- MVP: Stetson Bennett (Georgia, QB); Javon Bullard (Georgia, S)
- Favorite: Georgia by 13½
- National anthem: Pentatonix
- Referee: Jeff Heaser (ACC)
- Attendance: 72,628

United States TV coverage
- Network: ESPN
- Announcers: Chris Fowler (play-by-play), Kirk Herbstreit (analyst), Holly Rowe and Molly McGrath (sidelines)
- Nielsen ratings: 4.65 (16.6 million viewers)

International TV coverage
- Network: ESPN Deportes; Brazil: ESPN Brazil/Star+ Canada: TSN1/3/4/5; Latin America: ESPN/Star+ Oceania: ESPN
- Announcers: ESPN Deportes: Eduardo Varela (play-by-play), Pablo Viruega (analyst) and Katia Castorena (sidelines); ESPN Brazil: Matheus Pinheiro (play-by-play), Weinny Eirado (analyst), Deivis Chiodini (analyst) and Giane Pessoa (rules analyst);

The 2023 College Football Playoff National Championship (officially known as the 2023 College Football Playoff National Championship presented by AT&T for sponsorship reasons) was a college football bowl game that was played on January 9, 2023, at SoFi Stadium in Inglewood, California. The ninth College Football Playoff National Championship, the game determined the national champion of the NCAA Division I Football Bowl Subdivision (FBS) for the 2022 season. It was the final game of the 2022–23 College Football Playoff (CFP) and, aside from any all-star games following after, was the culminating game of the 2022–23 bowl season. The game began at approximately 4:45 p.m. PST and was televised by ESPN.

The game featured the defending national champion No. 1 Georgia Bulldogs of the Southeastern Conference (SEC), winners of the Peach Bowl semifinal, and the No. 3 TCU Horned Frogs of the Big 12 Conference, winners of the Fiesta Bowl semifinal.

Georgia defeated TCU, 65–7. The 58-point victory for Georgia was the largest margin of victory in a College Football Playoff National Championship Game and at the time, was the largest margin of victory in any bowl game at the FBS level, until the Bulldogs surpassed that the following season in the 2023 Orange Bowl. Georgia became the first team since the 2012 Alabama Crimson Tide to repeat as national champions. They also became the third FBS team to complete a 15–0 season in the modern era. This was the fourth consecutive national championship won by the Southeastern Conference (SEC). The broadcast of the game on ESPN saw the smallest audience in the game's history, coming at 16.6 million viewers.

== Background ==
This was the fourth consecutive College Football Playoff National Championship matching the No. 3 seed and the No. 1 seed. The first was the 2020 edition, where the top-ranked LSU Tigers beat the third-ranked Clemson Tigers by a score of 42–25 at the Mercedes-Benz Superdome in New Orleans. The second was the 2021 edition, where the top-ranked Alabama beat the third-ranked Ohio State by a score of 52–24 at Hard Rock Stadium in Miami Gardens, Florida. The third was when No. 3 Georgia beat No. 1 Alabama, 33–18, in the 2022 edition at Lucas Oil Stadium in Indianapolis.

=== Host selection ===
On November 1, 2017, SoFi Stadium was selected as host for the ninth edition of the championship, alongside the aforementioned 2021 and 2022 sites and NRG Stadium in Houston for 2024.

=== Venue ===
SoFi Stadium is a 70,240-seat venue in the Los Angeles suburb of Inglewood. Opened in September 2020, the fixed-roof stadium is home to the National Football League (NFL)'s Los Angeles Rams and Los Angeles Chargers, as well as the annual LA Bowl in college football. It had previously hosted Super Bowl LVI on February 13, 2022.

SoFi Stadium arranged for the game.
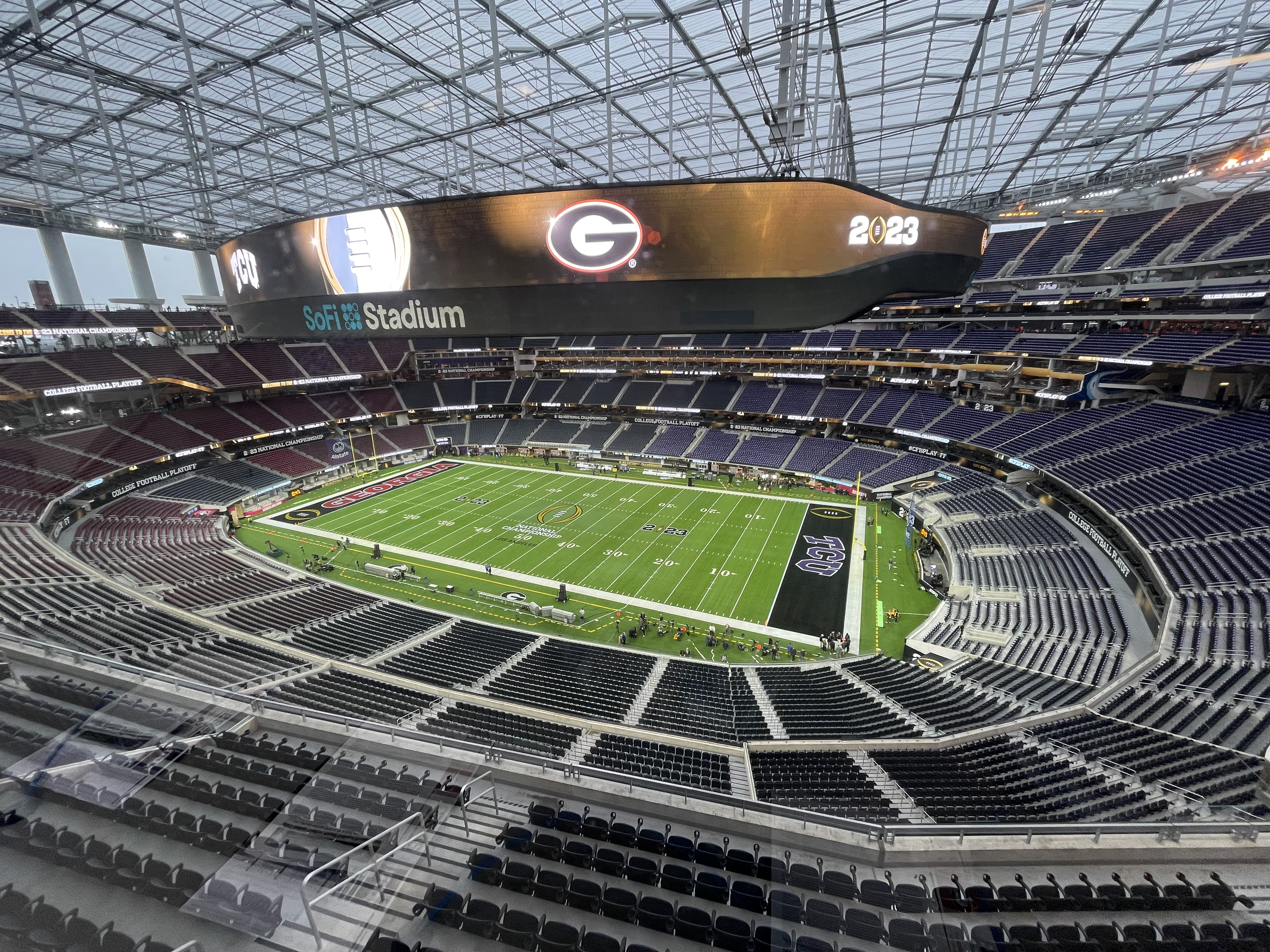
Press box view.

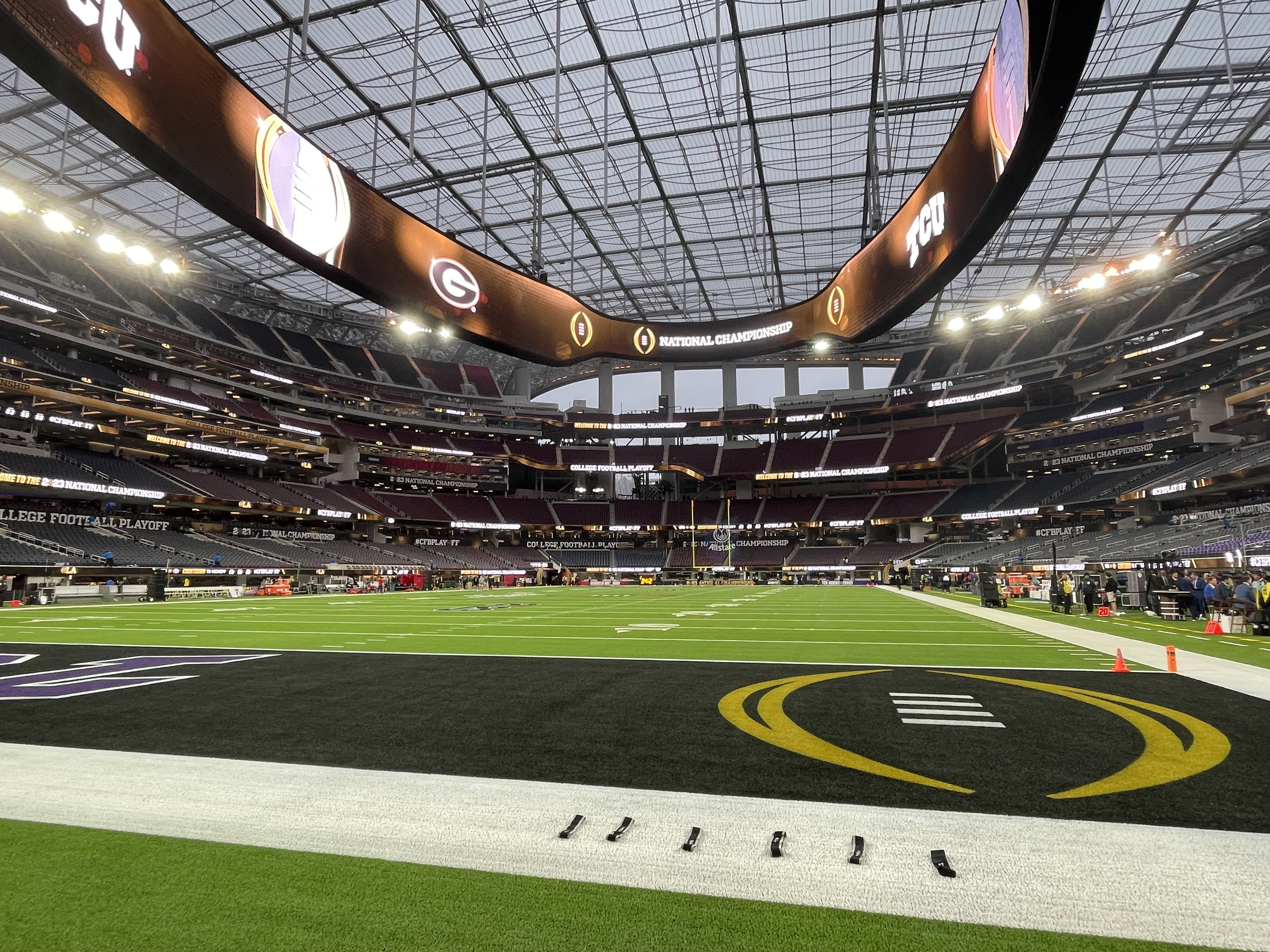
South end zone view.

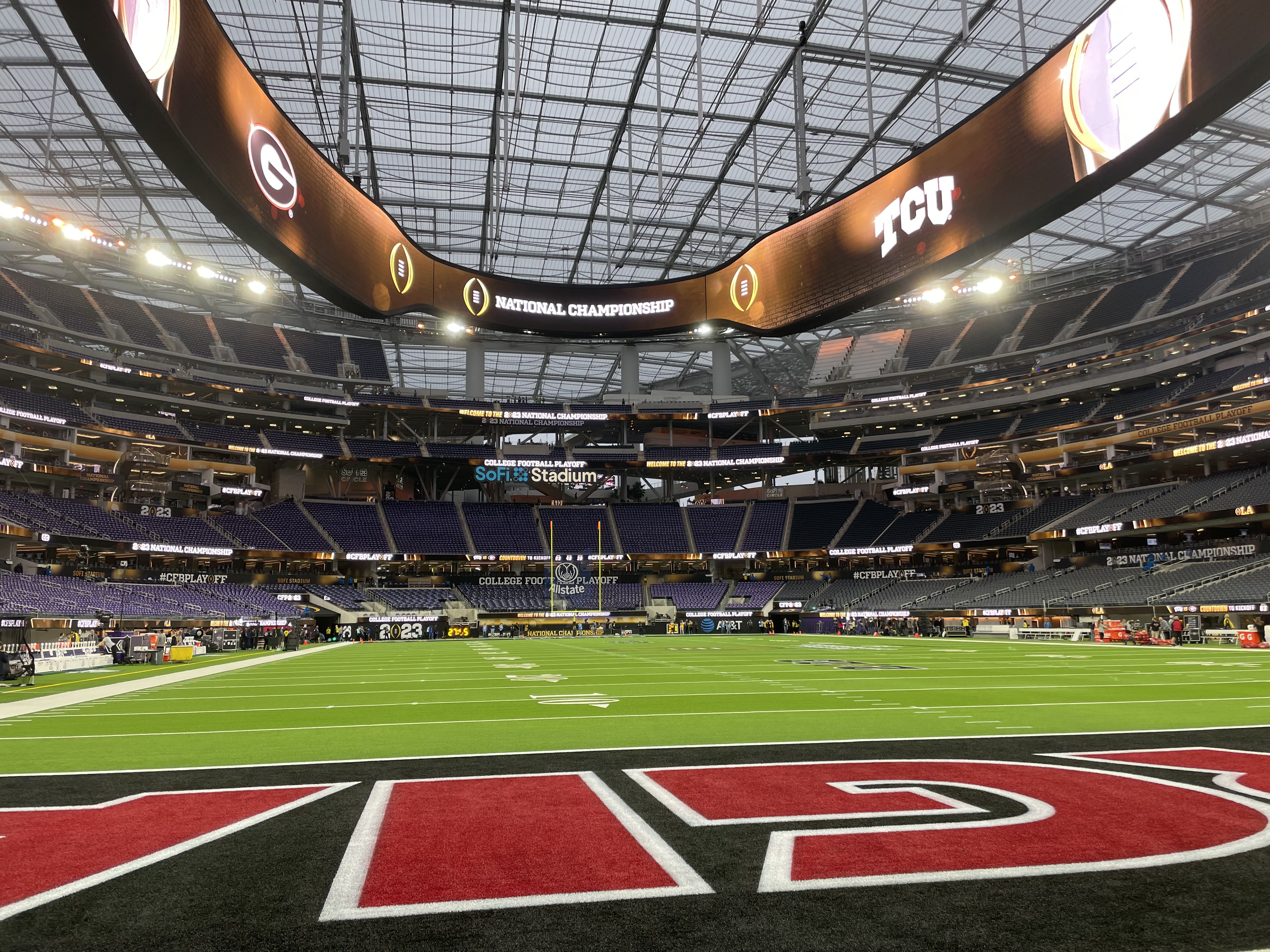
North end zone view.

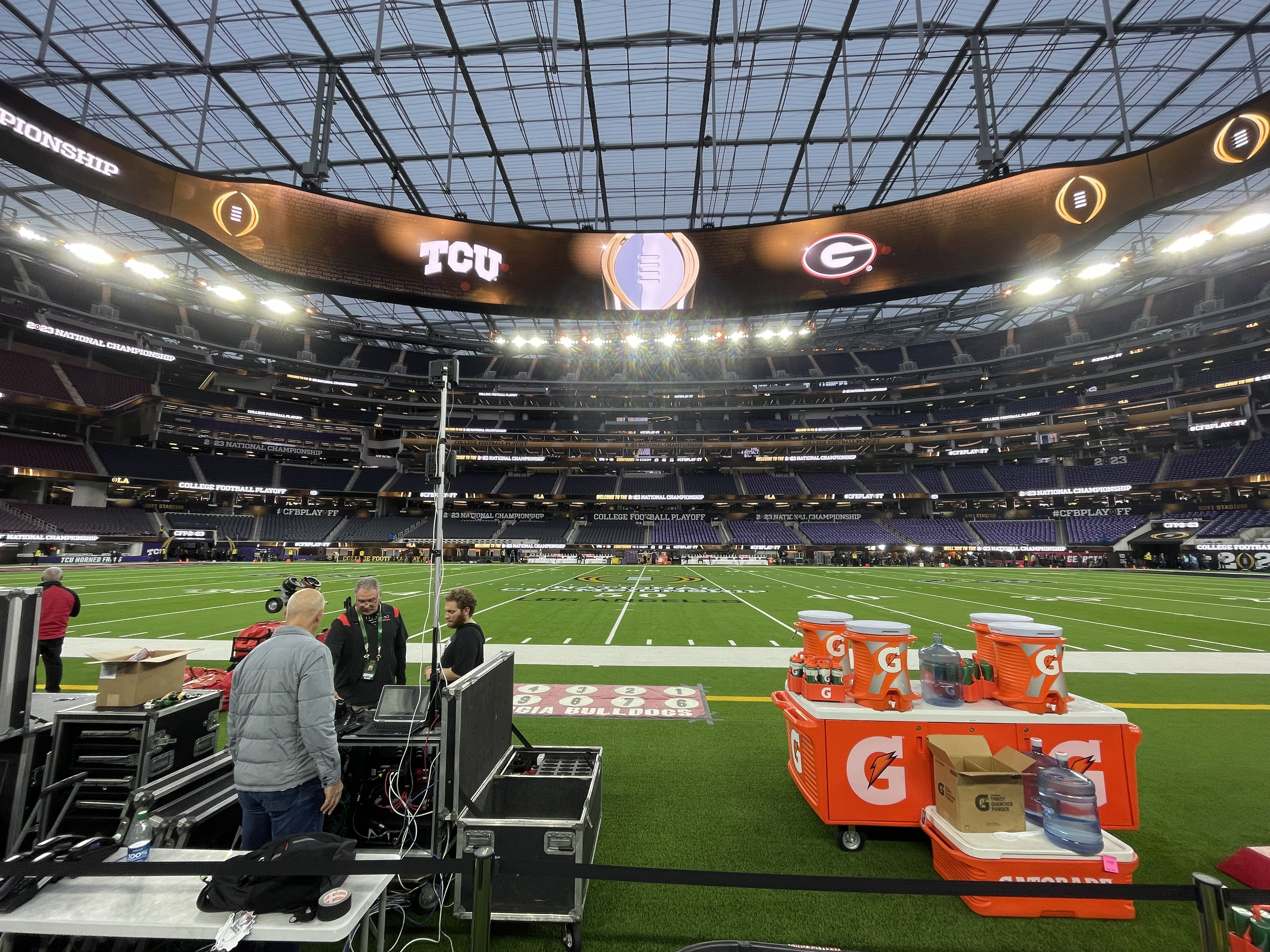
Georgia sideline view.

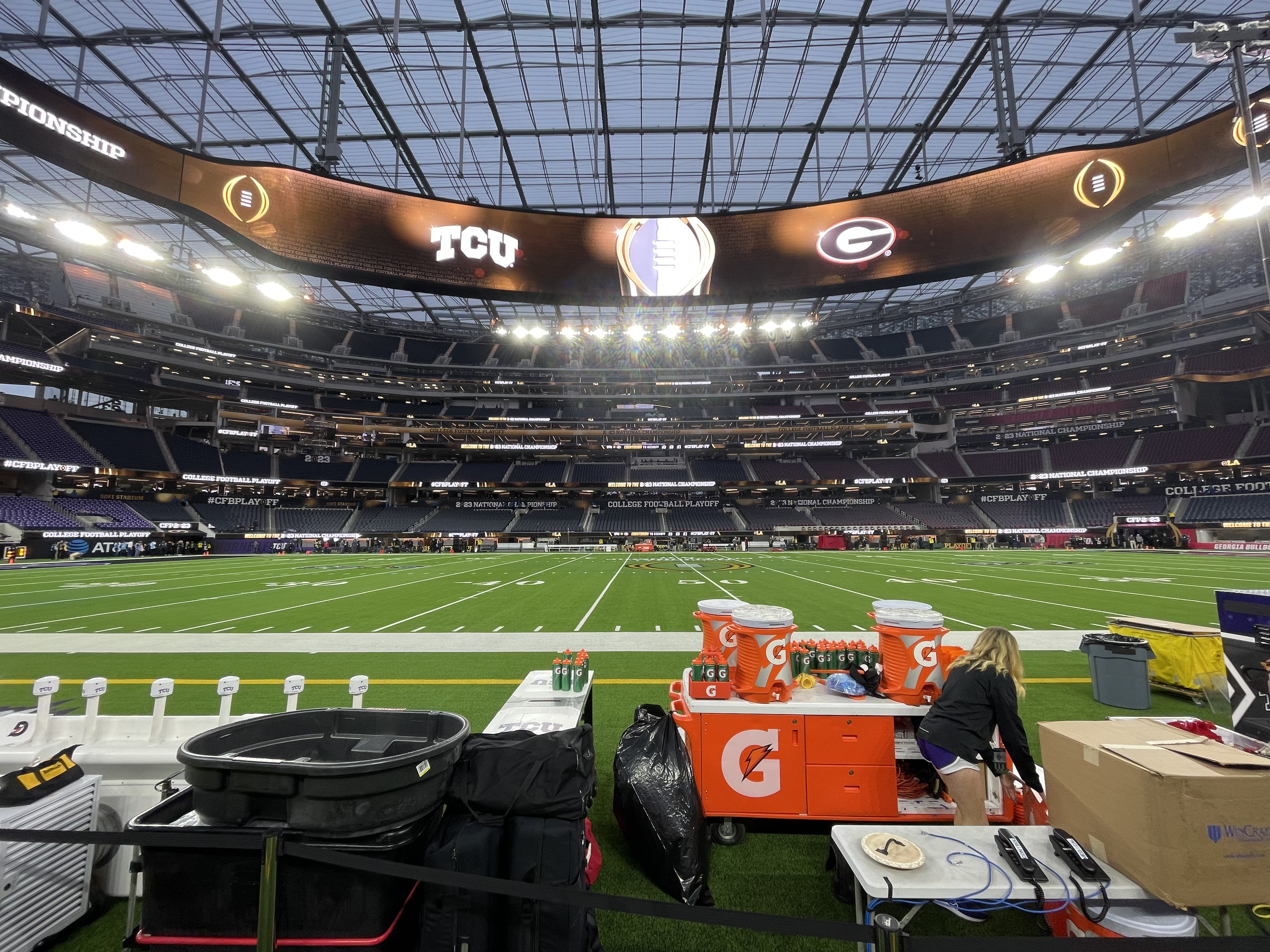
TCU sideline view.
Photos taken pre-game.

== Teams ==
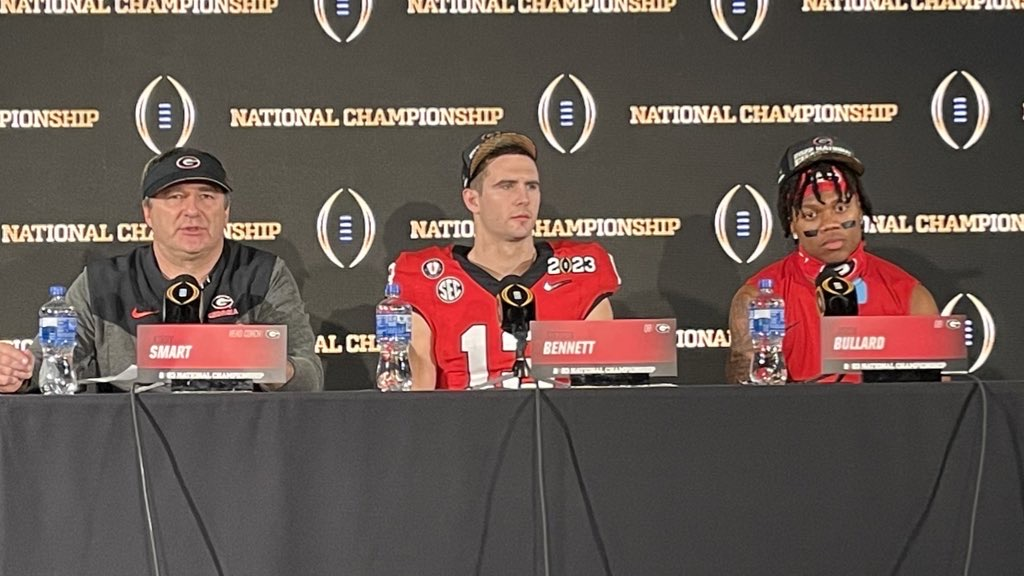
Post-game press conference with Georgia head coach Kirby Smart, quarterback Stetson Bennett (game's Offensive MVP), and defensive back Javon Bullard (game's Defensive MVP).

The championship game matched TCU from the Big 12 Conference and Georgia from the Southeastern Conference (SEC). The programs had previously met four times, most recently in the December 2016 edition of the Liberty Bowl, with Georgia winning each of the prior matchups.

=== TCU ===
The TCU Horned Frogs, under the leadership of first-year head coach Sonny Dykes, finished the regular season with an unblemished 12–0 record and finished Big 12 play at 9–0. That record put them atop the Big 12 and into the conference championship game, where they fell to Kansas State in an upset, leaving TCU with a 12–1 record. It did not impact their No. 3 ranking, as they were selected to that spot in the College Football Playoff (CFP). In the Fiesta Bowl semifinal, the Horned Frogs defeated No. 2 Michigan, 51–45.

This game was the first time a Big 12 team appeared in an FBS championship game since the 2010 BCS National Championship Game; the most recent national championship game won by a Big 12 team was the 2006 Rose Bowl (when the current FBS was still known as Division I-A). In the history of college football national championships at the highest level of competition, TCU has been named a national champion by one or more NCAA-recognized selectors three times: 1935, 1938, and 2010. TCU claims national championships for their 1935 and 1938 teams.

=== Georgia ===
Georgia was undefeated in their 12-game regular season, facing and defeating two ranked FBS teams, Oregon and Tennessee. Their closest victory was by four points, over Missouri; all of their other wins were by at least 10 points. Georgia qualified for the SEC Championship Game, where they defeated LSU, 50–30. Georgia entered the Peach Bowl semifinal with an overall 13–0 record, and were matched with No. 4 Ohio State. After Ohio State held a 38–24 lead in the third quarter, Georgia rallied for a 42–41 win, after Ohio State kicker Noah Ruggles' potential game-winning 50-yard field goal with 3 seconds left in the game sailed wide left.

Georgia became the first team to win back-to-back FBS championships since the 2011 Alabama and 2012 Alabama teams, and the first in the CFP era. In addition to the Bulldogs' 2021 season championship, Georgia claims national championships for their 1942 season and 1980 season.

Georgia's 58-point margin of victory was the largest of any bowl game ever.

== Starting lineups ==
TCU	Position		Georgia
Offense
Quentin Johnston 1	WR		Marcus Rosemy-Jacksaint
Derius Davis 4	WR		Ladd McConkey 2
Brandon Coleman 3	LT		Broderick Jones 1
† Steve Avila 2	LG		Xavier Truss
Alan Ali	C		Sedrick Van Pran-Granger 5
Wes Harris	RG		Tate Ratledge 2
Andrew Coker	RT		Amarius Mims 1
Jared Wiley 4	TE		Darnell Washington 3
Savion Williams 3	WR	TE	Brock Bowers 1
Max Duggan 7	QB		Stetson Bennett 4
Emari Demercado	RB		Kenny McIntosh 7
Defense
Dylan Horton 4	DE		Tramel Walthour
Damonic Williams	NG		Nazir Stackhouse
Terrell Cooper	DE	DT	† Jalen Carter 1
Jamoi Hodge	MLB	MAC	Smael Mondon Jr. 5
Johnny Hodges	WLB	MONEY	Jamon Dumas-Johnson
Dee Winters 6	SLB	OLB	Robert Beal Jr. 5
Tre Tomlinson 6	CB		Kelee Ringo 4
Josh Newton 5	CB		Kamari Lassiter 2
Mark Perry	SS		† Christopher Smith II 5
Bud Clark 2	FS		Malaki Starks 1
Millard Bradfrord	NB	STAR	Javon Bullard 2
† 2022 All-American
Selected in an NFL Draft (number corresponds to draft round)

== Game summary ==
=== First half ===
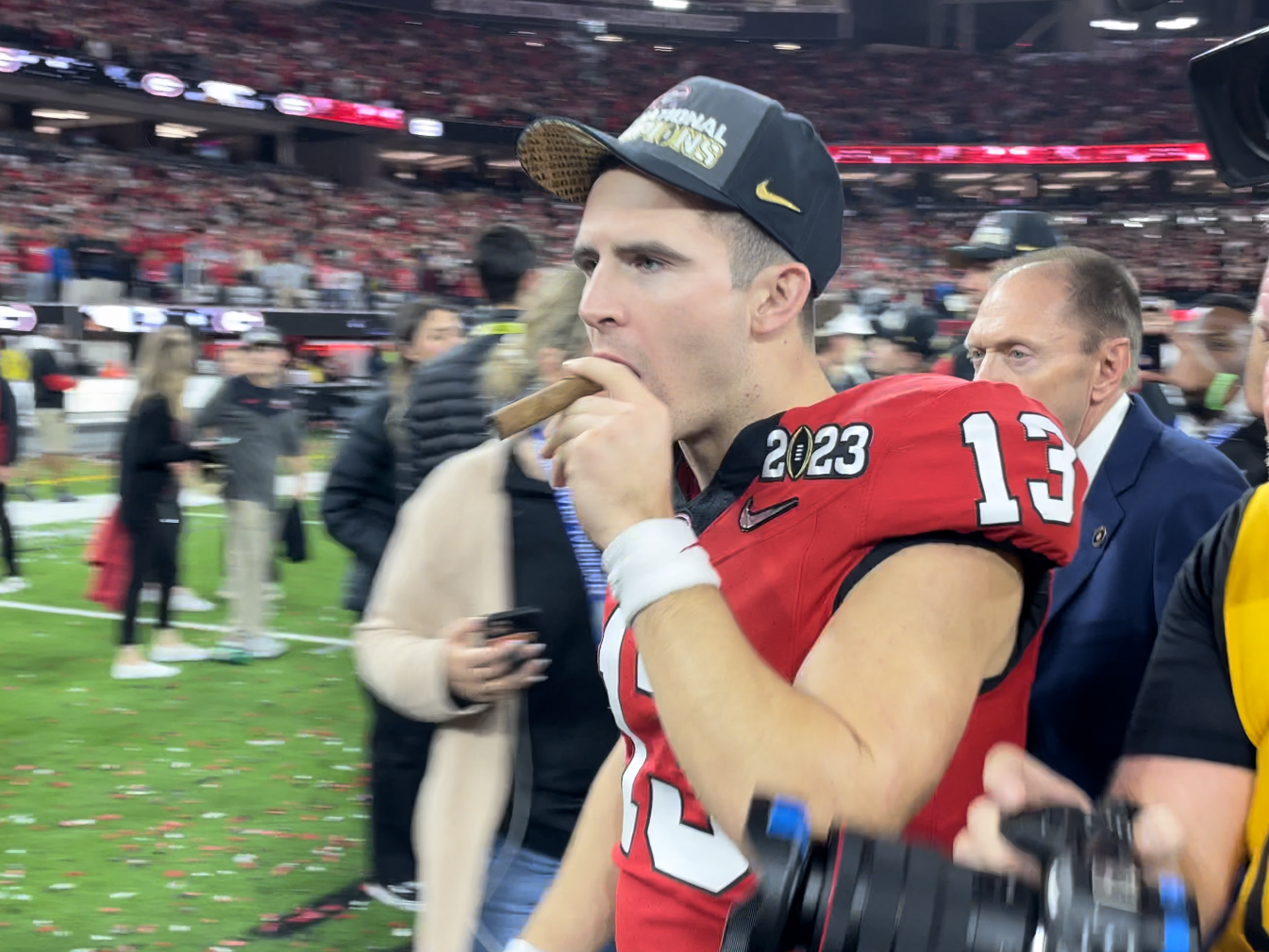
Bennett celebrates with a cigar immediately after the Bulldogs win

Georgia won the toss and elected to defer, and the opening kick by Jack Podlesny was a touchback. A TCU false start penalty by center Steve Avila set them back to the TCU 20 to start the game. This would result in a three-and-out by quarterback Max Duggan. A fair catch by Kearis Jackson started Georgia's drive at their own 43. Xavier Truss would also be called for false start, moving the ball back to their own 38. That did not matter, as 4 quick plays set-up Stetson Bennett's 21 yard touchdown run, and Georgia got the early lead, 7–0. TCU's next drive would be another disaster. Max Duggan got sacked on the first play of the drive for -6 yards. He then connected to Derius Davis for two yards. However, a defensive holding penalty by Javon Bullard would give them a first down. Javon Bullard got right back and recovered the ensuing fumble by Derius Davis. Another five plays would set up Jack Podlesny's 26-yd field goal, to give them a 10–0 lead. A 60-yard pass to Derius Davis on TCU's next drive would set up Max Duggan's 2-yd TD run, to cut the lead to three points, 10–7. It would be their only points of the game. A four play Georgia drive would couple with a wide-open 37-yd TD catch by Ladd McConkey to end the first quarter 17–7. After another TCU punt, and after an 11-play drive, which included a 35-yard pass from Brock Bowers, then setup Stetson Bennett's 6-yd untouched touchdown, to extend their lead by 17 points (24–7). Emari Demercado would run for 3 yards on TCU's next drive, but an offensive holding penalty pushed them back to their own 15. After another play, Javon Bullard would get his first interception of the game. After another 11-play drive, would set up Kendall Milton's 1-yd touchdown run, to extend their lead by 24 points (31–7). It would be the same thing for TCU's next drive, with Javon Bullard's second interception of the game. Stetson Bennett would connect with Adonai Mitchell for a 22-yd touchdown catch to end the first half with a 38–7 lead, coming into the break.

=== Second half ===
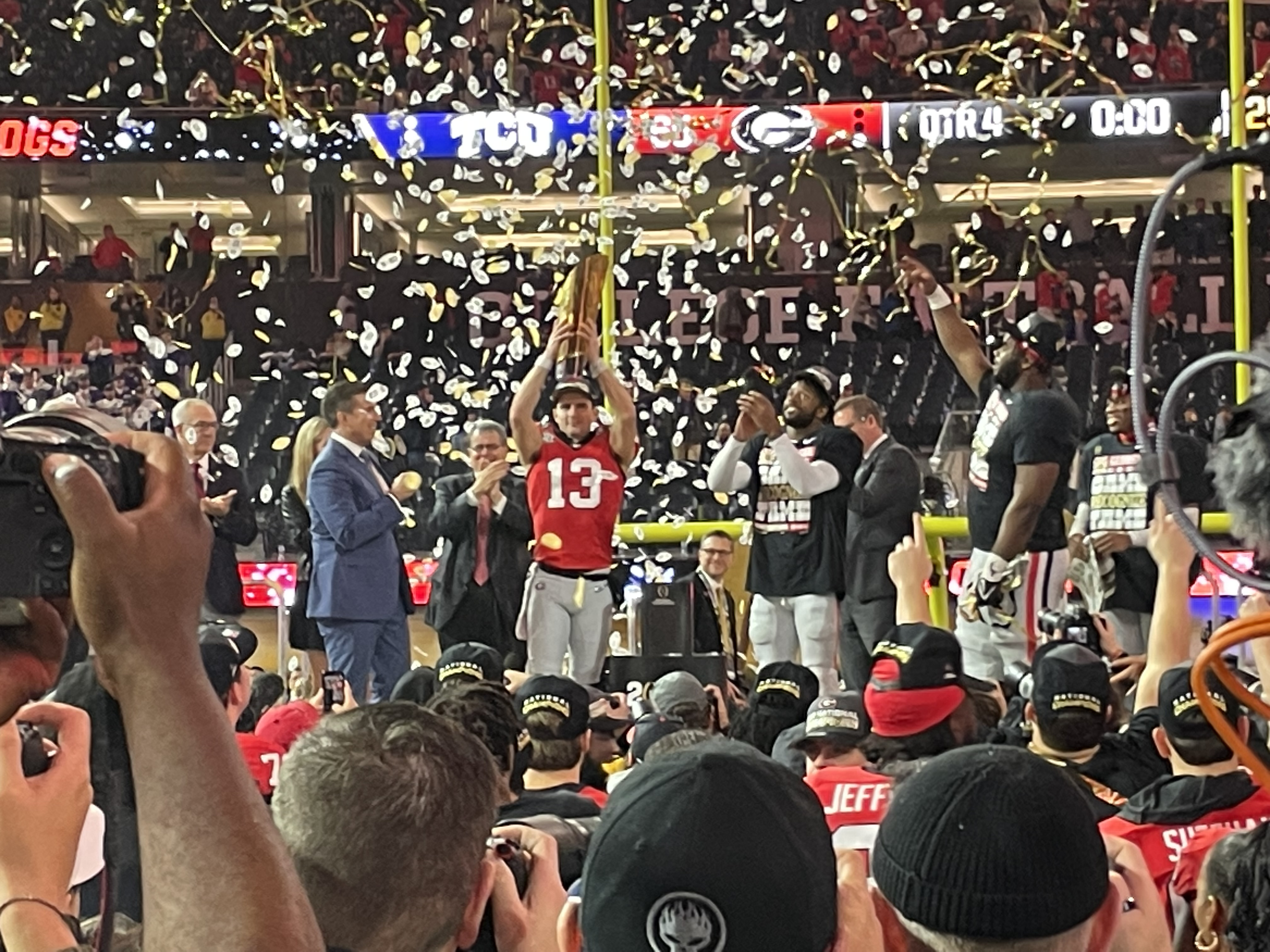
Bennett hoists the CFP Trophy after the game.

Since Georgia elected to defer, they got the ball back to start the second half. After both teams traded punts, and after a 3-play drive for Georgia, Stetson Bennett found Brock Bowers for a 22 yd TD, to make it 45–7. After an offensive holding penalty to start TCU's drive at their own 18, another quick three and out occurred, giving Georgia the ball back at their own 16. This would come with a 9 play, 84 yard drive, which resulted in Ladd McConkey's second touchdown of the game, to make it 52–7. TCU's subsequent drives would both be turnover on downs, with Georgia touchdowns in between them. After Branson Robinson 19 yd TD run, Jack Podlesny's extra point try subsequently missed, making it 65–7. After another TCU punt, Georgia ran out the remaining clock, making the final score 65–7, and repeating as national champions.

=== Scoring summary ===
2023 College Football Playoff National Championship

Quarter	1	2	3	4	Total
No. 3 TCU	7	0	0	0	7
No. 1 Georgia	17	21	14	13	65

at SoFi Stadium • Inglewood, California

- Date: Monday, January 9, 2023
- Game time: 4:45 p.m. PST
- Game weather: Cloudy • Temperature: 60 °F (16 °C) • Wind: 14 mph (23 km/h) southeast
- Game attendance: 72,628
- Referee: Jeff Heaser (ACC)
- TV announcers (ESPN): Chris Fowler (play-by-play), Kirk Herbstreit (analyst), Holly Rowe and Molly McGrath (sidelines)
- Box score

Scoring summary

Quarter	Time	Drive			Team	Scoring information	Score	
Quarter	Time	Plays	Yards	TOP	Team	Scoring information	TCU	Georgia
1	11:01	5	57	2:58	Georgia	Stetson Bennett 21-yard touchdown run, Jack Podlesny kick good	0	7
1	6:51	6	27	2:39	Georgia	24-yard field goal by Jack Podlesny	0	10
1	4:45	5	75	2:08	TCU	Max Duggan 2-yard touchdown run, Griffin Kell kick good	7	10
1	2:43	4	70	2:02	Georgia	Ladd McConkey 37-yard touchdown reception from Stetson Bennett, Jack Podlesny kick good	7	17
2	8:30	11	92	5:43	Georgia	Stetson Bennett 6-yard touchdown run, Jack Podlesny kick good	7	24
2	1:19	11	68	5:15	Georgia	Kendall Milton 1-yard touchdown run, Jack Podlesny kick good	7	31
2	0:26	2	22	0:10	Georgia	Adonai Mitchell 22-yard touchdown reception from Stetson Bennett, Jack Podlesny kick good	7	38
3	10:52	4	55	1:22	Georgia	Brock Bowers 22-yard touchdown reception from Stetson Bennett, Jack Podlesny kick good	7	45
3	2:17	9	84	5:17	Georgia	Ladd McConkey 14-yard touchdown reception from Stetson Bennett, Jack Podlesny kick good	7	52
4	9:24	9	54	4:49	Georgia	Branson Robinson 1-yard touchdown run, Jack Podlesny kick good	7	59
4	7:23	1	19	0:07	Georgia	Branson Robinson 19-yard touchdown run, Jack Podlesny kick failed (wide left)	7	65
"TOP" = time of possession. For other American football terms, see Glossary of American football.							7	65

== Statistics ==
Team statistical comparison
Statistic	TCU	Georgia
First downs	9	32
First downs rushing	4	15
First downs passing	4	16
First downs penalty	1	1
Third down efficiency	2–11	9–13
Fourth down efficiency	0–2	1–1
Total plays–net yards	51–188	72–589
Rushing attempts–net yards	28–36	44–254
Yards per rush	1.3	5.8
Yards passing	152	335
Pass completions–attempts	14–23	20–28
Interceptions thrown	2	0
Punt returns–total yards	0–0	0–0
Kickoff returns–total yards	6–138	1–27
Punts–average yardage	5–37.0	1–48.0
Fumbles–lost	1–1	0–0
Penalties–yards	5–50	4–30
Time of possession	23:01	35:59

TCU statistics
Horned Frogs passing
	C–A	Yds	TD–INT
Max Duggan	14–22	152	0–2
Chandler Morris	0–1	0	0–0
Horned Frogs rushing
	Car	Yds	TD
Emari Demercado	14	59	0
Emani Bailey	2	9	0
Chandler Morris	1	4	0
Derius Davis	1	2	0
Max Duggan	10	-38	1
Horned Frogs receiving
	Rec	Yds	TD
Derius Davis	5	101	0
Blair Conwright	1	15	0
Jared Wiley	2	14	0
Geor'Quarius Spivey	1	10	0
Taye Barber	1	8	0
Quentin Johnston	1	3	0
Emani Bailey	1	2	0
Corey Wren	1	1	0
Emari Demercado	1	-2	0

Georgia statistics
Bulldogs passing
	C–A	Yds	TD–INT
Stetson Bennett	18–25	304	4–0
Carson Beck	2–3	31	0–0
Bulldogs rushing
	Car	Yds	TD
Kenny McIntosh	8	50	0
Branson Robinson	7	42	2
Stetson Bennett	3	39	2
Sevaughn Clark	5	35	0
Kendall Milton	10	33	1
Daijun Edwards	5	30	0
Brock Bowers	2	15	0
Ladd McConkey	1	14	0
Bulldogs receiving
	Rec	Yds	TD
Brock Bowers	7	152	1
Ladd McConkey	5	88	2
Darnell Washington	1	28	0
Adonai Mitchell	1	22	1
Kearis Jackson	1	20	0
Daijun Edwards	2	12	0
Dillon Bell	1	11	0
Arian Smith	1	3	0
Kenny McIntosh	1	-1	0

== Aftermath ==
Georgia went on to an undefeated regular season in 2023, and extended their winning streak to 29 games, heading into the 2023 SEC Championship Game against Alabama. Georgia lost, 27–24, which snapped their 29-game winning streak, and failed to make the College Football Playoff and play for a third consecutive national title. The team also became the first to miss the playoffs after being ranked number one going into the championship weekend. Georgia was invited to the Orange Bowl against Florida State, where they earned a dominating 63–3 win, setting a new record for the largest margin of victory of any bowl game at the FBS level (or its historical predecessors). Meanwhile, TCU had a rough season. With the loss of Duggan, TCU plummeted to No. 17 in the preseason polls. They lost to Colorado in the season opener, 45-42. They then won their next three games, but after that, suffered a collapse, losing six of their last eight games of the regular season to finish 5–7 and missed becoming bowl-eligible.

== Broadcasting ==
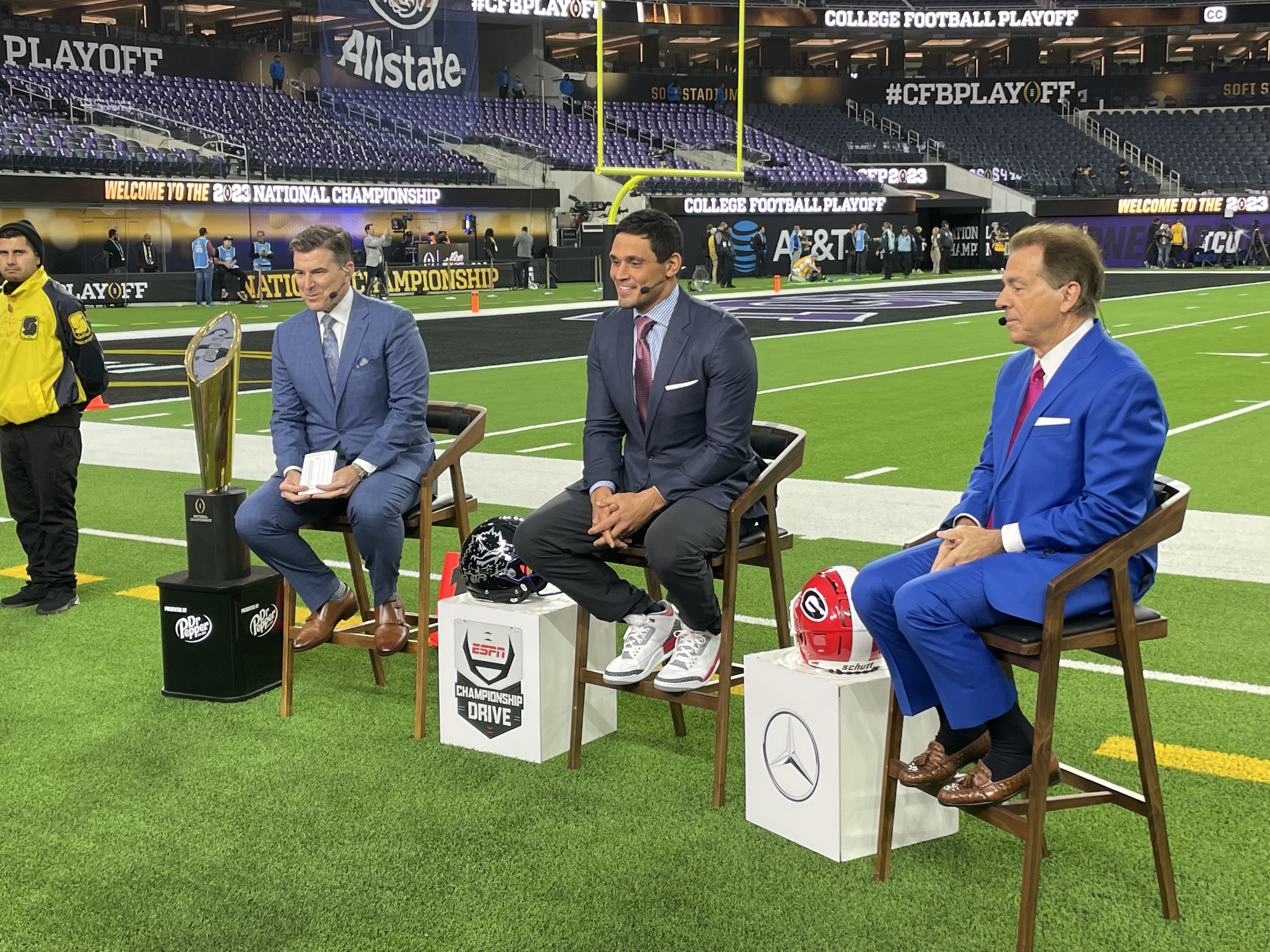
Rece Davis, David Pollack, and Nick Saban give pre-game commentary from the sideline of SoFi Stadium.

This was the ninth consecutive College Football Playoff National Championship game to be televised on ESPN, and offered its MegaCast coverage, which also televised the Playoff semifinals, and the championship game on all of its networks except ABC with alternate broadcasts; the primary telecast aired on ESPN while other channels in the ESPN family of networks aired alternate broadcasts.

=== Commentary teams ===
- ESPN: Chris Fowler (play-by-play), Kirk Herbstreit (analyst), and Holly Rowe and Molly McGrath (sidelines)
- ESPN Radio: Sean McDonough (play-by-play), and Todd Blackledge (analyst), and Ian Fitzsimmons and Kris Budden (sidelines).
- ESPN2: "Field Pass" with The Pat McAfee Show, which featured Pat McAfee along with Robert Griffin III, Taylor Lewan, and A. Q. Shipley.
- ESPNU: Command Center, features the audio from the main telecast.
- ESPNews: SkyCast (branded as AT&T 5G SkyCast for sponsorship reasons, a continuous feed from the skycam), features audio from the main telecast.
- SEC Network: Georgia Hometown Radio, which features Scott Howard (play-by-play), Eric Zeier (analyst), and D. J. Shockley (sideline)
- Additionally, the All-22 broadcast (which aired with audio from the ESPN Radio broadcast), and both teams' Hometown Radio calls and Marching Bands were also available on the ESPN app.

== See also ==
- 2022 LA Bowl, contested at the same venue on December 17, 2022
- Super Bowl LVI, the NFL championship game contested at the same venue on February 13, 2022
- College football national championships in NCAA Division I FBS
