= 2022 NCAA football bowl games =

In college football, 2022 NCAA football bowl games may refer to:

- 2021–22 NCAA football bowl games, for games played in January 2022 as part of the 2021 season.
- 2022–23 NCAA football bowl games, for games played in December 2022 as part of the 2022 season.
