= 2022 Fiesta Bowl (December) =

American college football game

2022 Vrbo Fiesta Bowl
- College Football Playoff Semifinal; 52nd Fiesta Bowl
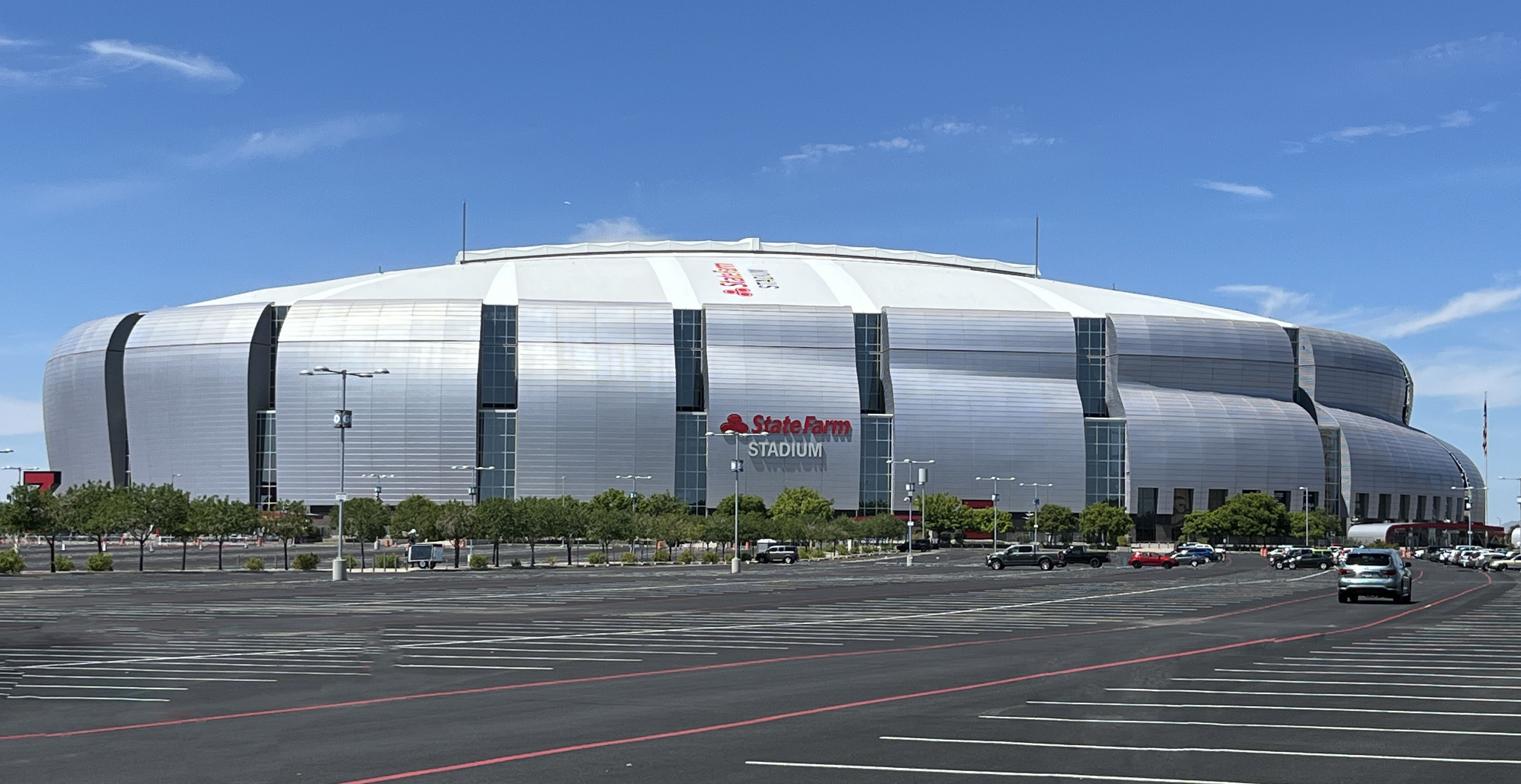
- State Farm Stadium in Glendale, Arizona, hosted the Fiesta Bowl.
TCU Horned Frogs	Michigan Wolverines
(12–1)	(13–0)
Big 12	Big Ten
51	45
Head coach: Sonny Dykes	Head coach: Jim Harbaugh
AP / Coaches / CFP; 3 / 4 / 3	AP / Coaches / CFP; 2 / 2 / 2
	1	2	3	4	Total
TCU	14	7	20	10	51
Michigan	0	6	24	15	45
- Date: December 31, 2022
- Season: 2022
- Stadium: State Farm Stadium
- Location: Glendale, Arizona, US
- MVP: Quentin Johnston (WR, TCU); Dee Winters (LB, TCU)
- Favorite: Michigan by 7½
- National anthem: Boyz II Men
- Referee: Jason Autrey (SEC)
- Attendance: 71,723

United States TV coverage
- Network: ESPN
- Announcers: Sean McDonough (play-by-play), Todd Blackledge (analyst), Molly McGrath, and Tiffany Blackmon (sidelines)
- Nielsen ratings: 10.0 (21.7 million viewers)

International TV coverage
- Network: ESPN Deportes
- Announcers: Ciro Procuna (play-by-play), Ramiro Pruneda (analyst), and Carlos Nava (sidelines)

The 2022 Fiesta Bowl (officially known as the College Football Playoff Semifinal at the Vrbo Fiesta Bowl for sponsorship reasons) was a college football bowl game played on December 31, 2022, at State Farm Stadium in Glendale, Arizona, United States. The game was the 52nd annual playing of the Fiesta Bowl, one of the two semifinals of the 2022–23 College Football Playoff (CFP), and was one of the bowl games concluding the 2022 FBS football season. The game began at approximately 2:00 p.m. MST and aired on ESPN. It featured two of the four teams chosen by the selection committee to participate in the playoff: the TCU Horned Frogs from the Big 12 Conference and the Michigan Wolverines from the Big Ten Conference. The winner qualified for the 2023 College Football Playoff National Championship against the winner of the other semifinal, hosted at the Peach Bowl.

Michigan entered the game with an unbeaten 13–0 record as Big Ten champions following their win over Purdue in the Big Ten Championship, while TCU entered 12–1 in the aftermath of their only loss of the season, to Kansas State in the Big 12 Championship. This game was the first meeting between Michigan and TCU. It marked Michigan's second appearance in the CFP in as many years, following their semifinal loss to Georgia the year prior, and it was TCU's debut in the CFP. Michigan made their first Fiesta Bowl appearance since 1986, while TCU participated in their first Fiesta Bowl since 2010.

TCU scored the game's first points on a pick-six and led 14–0 at the conclusion of the first quarter following a rushing touchdown by quarterback Max Duggan. Michigan's first points came by way of a 42-yard field goal by placekicker Jake Moody; he made another from 59 yards to end the first half though a TCU touchdown by Taye Barber five minutes earlier gave the Horned Frogs a 21–6 advantage at halftime. Michigan began the third quarter with ten straight points, including a touchdown pass from J. J. McCarthy to Ronnie Bell, and TCU countered with two unanswered touchdowns of their own, pushing their lead to eighteen points. The teams alternated touchdowns, Michigan scoring two and TCU scoring one, before the end of the third quarter. Michigan scored a touchdown forty-seven seconds into the fourth quarter and made the two-point conversion, which narrowed their deficit to three points. A 76-yard TCU touchdown, followed by a Horned Frogs field goal four minutes later, extended the lead to thirteen points before a Roman Wilson touchdown made it 51–45. After a TCU punt, Michigan suffered a turnover on downs, and the game concluded with TCU receiving the national championship bid.

== Background ==
The Fiesta Bowl was founded by supporters of the Western Athletic Conference and was held for the first time in December 1971. The game was held at Sun Devil Stadium (now Mountain America Stadium) in Tempe, Arizona, until 2006. The game moved to State Farm Stadium (at the time called University of Phoenix Stadium) in Glendale in 2007, where it has been played since then. The game was a part of the Bowl Alliance and the Bowl Coalition before becoming a part of the Bowl Championship Series (BCS) at the start of the 1998 season. The Fiesta Bowl functioned as the national championship in 1999 and 2003, and it hosted the BCS National Championship Game in 2007 and 2011. Upon the implementation of the College Football Playoff (CFP) for the 2014 season, the Fiesta Bowl hosted playoff semifinal games in 2016 and 2019.

=== College Football Playoff ===
The four teams competing in the Playoff were chosen by the CFP selection committee, whose final rankings were released on December 4, 2022. The committee selected No. 1 Georgia of the Southeastern Conference, No. 2 Michigan of the Big Ten Conference, No. 3 TCU of the Big 12 Conference, and No. 4 Ohio State of the Big Ten Conference. Georgia and Michigan were champions of their respective conferences, while TCU lost in their conference championship game and Ohio State finished second in their division. Georgia and Michigan entered the playoff with undefeated 13–0 records while TCU entered 12–1 and Ohio State entered 11–1.

Semifinals
December 31 – Peach Bowl Mercedes-Benz Stadium, Atlanta
1	Georgia	42
4	Ohio State	41
December 31 – Fiesta Bowl State Farm Stadium, Glendale
2	Michigan	45
3	TCU	51

Championship
January 10 – National Championship SoFi Stadium, Inglewood
1	Georgia	65
3	TCU	7

== Teams ==
The game featured the Michigan Wolverines, champions of the Big Ten Conference, playing against the Big 12 Conference runner-up TCU Horned Frogs. This was the first meeting between the teams.

The Horned Frogs entered the CFP after facing the longest odds of any team to ever do so at 200–1 and entered this game as underdogs by 7.5 points.

=== TCU ===
The TCU Horned Frogs, under the leadership of first-year head coach Sonny Dykes, finished the regular season with an unblemished 12–0 record and finished Big 12 play similarly at 9–0. That record put them atop the Big 12 and into the conference championship game, where they fell to Kansas State in an upset that knocked them to 12–1. It did not impact their No. 3 ranking, as they were selected to that spot in the College Football Playoff (CFP); this was their first CFP appearance and the first appearance by a team from Texas. This was TCU's first Fiesta Bowl appearance since 2010, when they lost to Boise State.

TCU quarterback Max Duggan, who entered the year as the Horned Frogs' backup, led their offense to a successful year in which they averaged over 40 points per game and nearly seven yards per play. Duggan, who finished second in Heisman Trophy voting, entered the game having completed 64.9% of his passes, leading the nation, and sporting a ratio of 30 passing touchdowns to four interceptions. TCU's defense earned praise from analysts as well as cornerbacks Josh Newton and Tre Tomlinson led the team to the second-best pass efficiency defense in the Big 12. Previews cited TCU's positive results in one-score games, five wins and no losses, as a reason that they might have the edge should the game remain close late.

=== Michigan ===
Jim Harbaugh's Michigan team finished the regular season with a perfect 12–0 record and went 9–0 in Big Ten Conference matchups, including a second-straight victory against Ohio State. They earned the first 13-win season in Michigan program history with a win over Purdue in the conference championship. This was Michigan's second consecutive appearance in the CFP following their defeat to Georgia in the 2021 Orange Bowl. It was also Michigan's first appearance in the Fiesta Bowl since 1986, where the Wolverines, led by Harbaugh as quarterback, defeated Nebraska by a 27–23 score. The game was Michigan's 50th bowl game appearance, and they entered with a 21–28 record in prior appearances.

The Michigan rushing offense was cited by analysts as a strong point, even after the Wolverines lost running back Blake Corum during their regular season game against Illinois. Donovan Edwards took his place and had recorded over 800 yards and seven touchdowns in his time as the Wolverines' starter. Michigan's offensive line won the Joe Moore Award as college football's best offensive line unit. Michigan quarterback J. J. McCarthy entered the game ranked second in the Big Ten in quarterback rating and had Ronnie Bell and Cornelius Johnson, the Wolverines' two leading receivers by total receptions, to aid in the passing attack.

== Broadcast ==
The Fiesta Bowl was televised by ESPN, with a commentary team of Sean McDonough on play-by-play, Todd Blackledge providing analysis, and Molly McGrath and Tiffany Blackmon on the Michigan and TCU sidelines, respectively. The ESPN Radio broadcast was commentated by Marc Kestecher, Kelly Stouffer, and Ian Fitzsimmons.

ESPN aired its MegaCast coverage for both College Football Playoff semifinals and the National Championship Game; the primary telecast aired on ESPN while other channels in the ESPN family of networks aired alternate broadcasts. ESPN2 aired "Field Pass" with The Pat McAfee Show, which featured Pat McAfee along with Robert Griffin III, Taylor Lewan, and A. Q. Shipley, among others. Audio from the main telecast was played on both ESPNU, which aired Command Center, and ESPNews, which aired the SkyCast (a continuous feed from the skycam). The All-22 broadcast, on the ESPN app, was paired with audio from the ESPN Radio broadcast. The hometown radio broadcasts from each team was shown on the ESPN app as well; TCU's radio broadcast featured commentators Brian Estridge, John Denton, and Landry Burdine, while Michigan's featured a call from Doug Karsch, Jon Jansen, and Jason Avant. ESPN Deportes carried the Spanish-language broadcast, featuring Ciro Procuna, Ramiro Pruneda, and Carlos Nava.

== Game summary ==
The game's officiating crew, representing the Southeastern Conference, was led by referee Jason Autrey and umpire Brent Sowell. The game was played indoors at State Farm Stadium in Glendale, Arizona, on December 31, 2022, with a start time of 2:11 p.m. MST.

The pregame coin toss was won by TCU, who deferred their choice to the second half, thereby giving Michigan possession of the ball to begin the game.

=== First half ===
Michigan got the ball to begin the game from Luke Laminack's opening kickoff. On their first play from scrimmage, running back Donovan Edwards carried the ball for a 54-yard gain to reach the TCU 21-yard line; that drive ended with a turnover on downs as Michigan failed to convert 4th & Goal from the TCU 2. The Horned Frogs went three-and-out but scored the game's first points when Bud Clark intercepted a McCarthy pass on the first play of Michigan's ensuing drive and returned it 41 yards for a touchdown. The Wolverines punted for the first time on their next drive, giving TCU the ball back. A 21-yard pass from Duggan to Jordan Hudson followed on the next play, and the drive ended with a Max Duggan touchdown rush. The ensuing kickoff went out for a touchback, and the Wolverines offense recovered from a loss of 5 yards on their first play with a 32-yard pass from J. J. McCarthy to Luke Schoonmaker to enter TCU territory. The Wolverines advanced to the TCU 24-yard line before the end of the first quarter.

Michigan's Jake Moody attempted a 42-yard field goal, which he made, on the third play of the second quarter. The Wolverines forced a turnover on TCU's next play, an interception by Rod Moore at the Michigan 49-yard line, but did not score following a fumble by Kalel Mullings at the TCU 1-yard line. After the teams traded punts, TCU extended their lead to 18 points with a touchdown pass from Duggan to Taye Barber. Michigan punted on 4th & 20 on their following drive, giving TCU the ball with 1:20 until halftime. TCU also punted, with 47 seconds remaining, and Michigan began their possession at their own 33-yard line. After a pass interference penalty called against Tre Tomlinson moved the ball to the TCU 41-yard line, Jake Moody made a 59-yard field goal as time expired to narrow Michigan's deficit to 15 points going into halftime.

=== Second half ===
TCU got the ball to begin the second half but punted despite a 14-yard gain on their first play. After reaching midfield in two plays, Michigan drove to the TCU 4-yard line and made a 21-yard field goal. Mike Sainristil ended TCU's next drive early with an interception returned the TCU 45-yard line. Three plays later, McCarthy threw a 34-yard touchdown pass to Ronnie Bell; the extra point brought Michigan within five points. TCU's next drive started with a 46-yard pass from Duggan to Johnston and concluded with a 1-yard touchdown rush by Emari Demercado. TCU further extended their lead, back to an 18-point margin, following an interception return for a touchdown by Dee Winters, though the two-point conversion was unsuccessful. After the ensuing kickoff was returned to the Michigan 31-yard line, the Wolverines offense reached the red zone in two plays and scored one play later on a 20-yard McCarthy rush. The Wolverines attempted a two-point conversion but failed. The teams traded touchdowns for the remainder of the third quarter: Duggan rushed for a one-yard touchdown, and Mullings followed with another one-yard rushing score. A TCU fumble on the last play of the quarter was recovered by Michigan's Mazi Smith, giving the Wolverines possession at the TCU 27-yard line to begin the fourth.

Michigan scored on the second play of the fourth quarter when Roman Wilson rushed for an 18-yard touchdown. The successful two-point conversion, a pass from McCarthy to Bell, narrowed Michigan's deficit to three points. The Horned Frogs scored the game's next ten points; they scored a 76-yard passing touchdown on the third play of their next drive and added a 33-yard field goal after forcing a Michigan punt. After a three-and-out for each team, Michigan scored their final points of the game with 3:18 to play on a 5-yard Wilson touchdown reception. TCU punted on their final full drive; Michigan, trailing by six points, failed to advance past their own 25-yard line and turned the ball over on downs. This allowed TCU to run out the clock and claim a 51–45 victory.

=== Scoring summary ===
College Football Playoff Semifinal at the 2022 Vrbo Fiesta Bowl

Quarter	1	2	3	4	Total
No. 3 TCU	14	7	20	10	51
No. 2 Michigan	0	6	24	15	45

at State Farm Stadium • Glendale, Arizona

- Date: December 31, 2022
- Game time: 2:00 p.m. MST (Kickoff at 2:11 p.m. MST)
- Game weather: n/a (game played indoors)
- Game attendance: 71,723
- Referee: Jason Autrey
- TV announcers (ESPN): Sean McDonough (play-by-play), Todd Blackledge (analyst), Molly McGrath and Tiffany Blackmon (sidelines)
- Box score

Scoring summary

Quarter	Time	Drive			Team	Scoring information	Score	
Quarter	Time	Plays	Yards	TOP	Team	Scoring information	TCU	Michigan
1	9:22				TCU	Interception returned 41 yards for touchdown by Bud Clark, Griffin Kell kick good	7	0
1	2:27	12	76	5:19	TCU	Max Duggan 1-yard touchdown run, Griffin Kell kick good	14	0
2	13:46	8	51	3:41	Michigan	42-yard field goal by Jake Moody	14	3
2	4:56	10	83	4:24	TCU	Taye Barber 6-yard touchdown reception from Max Duggan, Griffin Kell kick good	21	3
2	0:00	5	26	0:47	Michigan	59-yard field goal by Jake Moody	21	6
3	9:29	7	63	4:09	Michigan	21-yard field goal by Jake Moody	21	9
3	6:32	3	45	1:12	Michigan	Ronnie Bell 34-yard touchdown reception from J. J. McCarthy, Jake Moody kick good	21	16
3	4:25	6	75	2:07	TCU	Emari Demercado 1-yard touchdown run, Griffin Kell kick good	28	16
3	2:52				TCU	Interception returned 29 yards for touchdown by Dee Winters, 2-point rush failed	34	16
3	1:47	3	69	0:58	Michigan	J. J. McCarthy 20-yard touchdown run, 2-point rush failed	34	22
3	0:49	3	78	0:52	TCU	Max Duggan 1-yard touchdown run, Griffin Kell kick good	41	22
3	0:03	3	75	0:46	Michigan	Kalel Mullings 1-yard touchdown run, 2-point rush good (J. J. McCarthy run)	41	30
4	14:13	2	27	0:47	Michigan	Roman Wilson 18-yard touchdown run, 2-point pass good (J. J. McCarthy pass to Ronnie Bell)	41	38
4	13:07	3	79	0:59	TCU	Quentin Johnston 76-yard touchdown reception from Max Duggan, Griffin Kell kick good	48	38
4	10:02	4	1	2:07	TCU	33-yard field goal by Griffin Kell	51	38
4	3:18	9	56	3:28	Michigan	Roman Wilson 5-yard touchdown reception from J. J. McCarthy, Jake Moody kick good	51	45
"TOP" = time of possession. For other American football terms, see Glossary of American football.							51	45

== Statistics ==
Team statistical comparison
Statistic	TCU	Michigan
First downs	19	25
First downs rushing	13	7
First downs passing	6	13
First downs penalty	0	5
Third down efficiency	8–16	3–13
Fourth down efficiency	0–0	0–2
Total plays–net yards	70–488	75–528
Rushing attempts–net yards	41–263	40–185
Yards per rush	6.4	4.6
Yards passing	225	342
Pass completions–attempts	14–29	21–35
Interceptions thrown	2	2
Punt returns–total yards	1–31	2–16
Kickoff returns–total yards	4–75	3–78
Punts–average yardage	6–44.5	5–44.6
Fumbles–lost	1–1	2–1
Penalties–yards	7–85	5–28
Time of possession	27:35	32:25

TCU statistics
Horned Frogs passing
	C–A	Yds	TD–INT
Max Duggan	14–29	225	2–2
Horned Frogs rushing
	Car	Yds	TD
Emari Demercado	17	150	1
Max Duggan	15	57	2
Kendre Miller	8	57	0
Horned Frogs receiving
	Rec	Yds	TD
Quentin Johnston	6	163	1
Jordan Hudson	2	34	0
Taye Barber	2	12	1
Derius Davis	2	12	0
Jared Wiley	1	6	0
Emari Demercado	1	−2	0

Michigan statistics
Wolverines passing
	C–A	Yds	TD–INT
J. J. McCarthy	20–34	343	2–2
Donovan Edwards	1–1	−1	0–0
Wolverines rushing
	Car	Yds	TD
Donovan Edwards	23	119	0
J. J. McCarthy	10	52	1
Roman Wilson	1	18	1
Kalel Mullings	5	4	1
Colston Loveland	1	−8	0
Wolverines receiving
	Rec	Yds	TD
Ronnie Bell	6	135	1
Roman Wilson	5	104	1
Colston Loveland	4	36	0
Luke Schoonmaker	1	32	0
Cornelius Johnson	2	30	0
Donovan Edwards	1	8	0
A. J. Henning	2	−3	0

== Aftermath ==
With the win, TCU advanced to the 2023 College Football Playoff National Championship, where they met Peach Bowl champions Georgia. TCU wide receiver Quentin Johnston and linebacker Dee Winters were named the game's offensive and defensive most valuable players.

The game was the second-most-viewed game of the postseason, as it received 21.7 million viewers and a Nielsen rating of 10.0. It finished behind only the other semifinal game between Georgia and Ohio State. It was among the top five most-viewed non-NFL broadcasts of the year and was the third-most-watched CFP semifinal to be played in the afternoon.
