= 2022 Peach Bowl =

College Football Playoff Semifinal bowl game

2022 Chick-fil-A Peach Bowl
- College Football Playoff Semifinal; 55th Peach Bowl
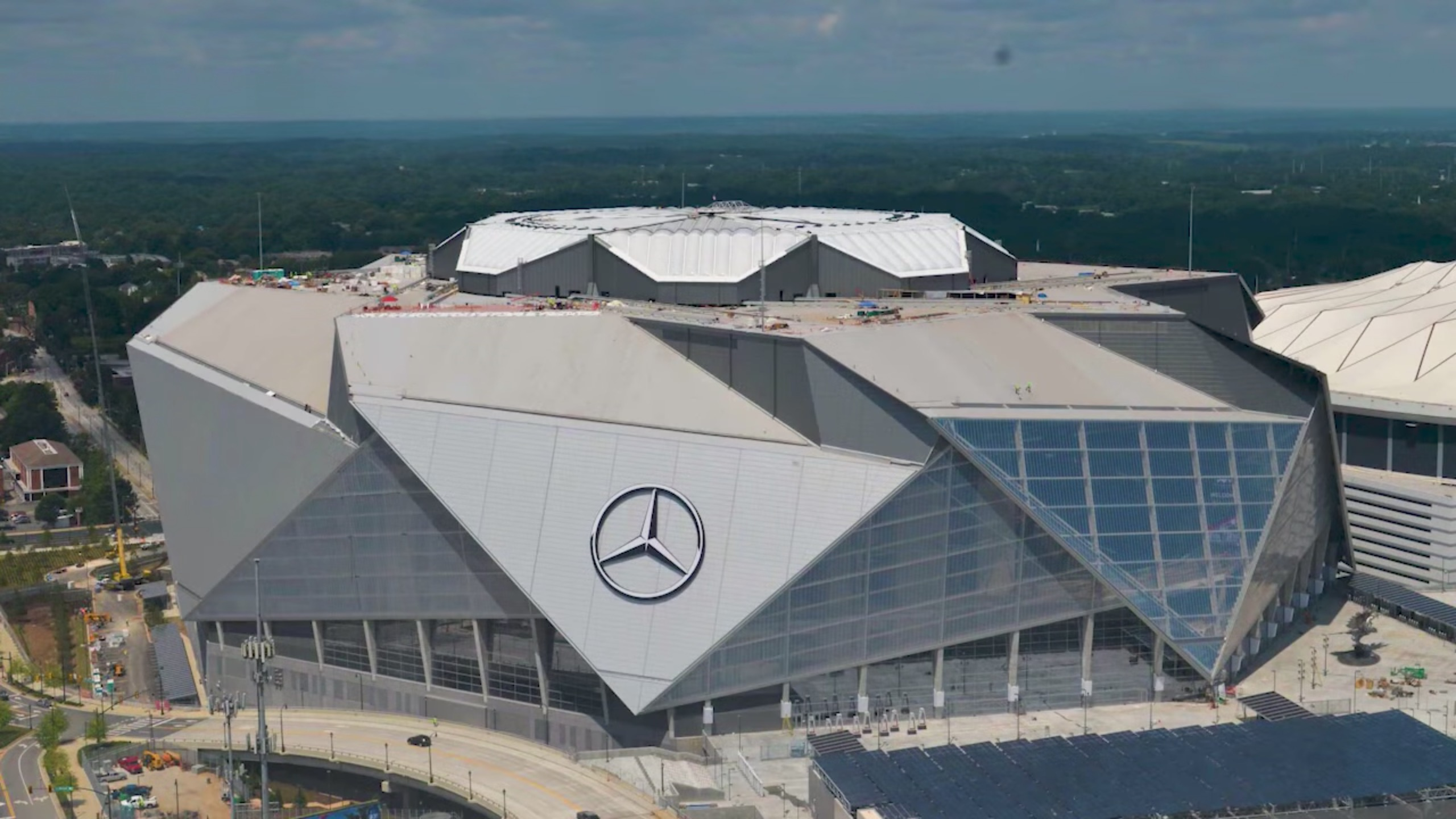
- Mercedes-Benz Stadium in Atlanta, Georgia, hosted the Peach Bowl.
Ohio State Buckeyes	Georgia Bulldogs
(11–1)	(13–0)
Big Ten	SEC
41	42
Head coach: Ryan Day	Head coach: Kirby Smart
AP / Coaches / CFP; 4 / 3 / 4	AP / Coaches / CFP; 1 / 1 / 1
	1	2	3	4	Total
Ohio State	7	21	10	3	41
Georgia	7	17	0	18	42
- Date: December 31, 2022
- Season: 2022
- Stadium: Mercedes-Benz Stadium
- Location: Atlanta, Georgia
- MVP: Stetson Bennett (QB, Georgia); Javon Bullard (S, Georgia)
- Favorite: Georgia by 5.5
- National anthem: Georgia Redcoat Marching Band
- Referee: Chris Coyte (Pac-12)
- Attendance: 79,330

United States TV coverage
- Network: ESPN
- Announcers: Chris Fowler (play-by-play), Kirk Herbstreit (analyst), Holly Rowe, and Laura Rutledge (sidelines)
- Nielsen ratings: (22.4 million viewers)

International TV coverage
- Network: ESPN Deportes
- Announcers: Eduardo Varela (play-by-play), Pablo Viruega (analyst), and Sebastián Christensen (sidelines)

The 2022 Peach Bowl (officially known as the College Football Playoff Semifinal at the Chick-fil-A Peach Bowl for sponsorship reasons) was a college football bowl game played on December 31, 2022, at Mercedes-Benz Stadium in Atlanta, Georgia. The game was the 55th annual playing of the Peach Bowl, one of the two semifinals of the 2022–23 College Football Playoff (CFP), and was one of the bowl games concluding the 2022 FBS football season. The game began at approximately 8:00 p.m. EST and aired on ESPN. It featured two of the four teams chosen by the selection committee to participate in the playoff: the Georgia Bulldogs from the Southeastern Conference (SEC) and the Ohio State Buckeyes from the Big Ten Conference. The winner qualified for the 2023 College Football Playoff National Championship against the winner of the other semifinal, hosted at the Fiesta Bowl.

Georgia entered the game as SEC champions with an undefeated 13–0 record, while Ohio State entered 11–1. The Bulldogs had defeated LSU in the SEC Championship, while Ohio State failed to qualify for the Big Ten title game following their loss to Michigan to conclude the regular season. This was the second meeting between Georgia and Ohio State; the first was a Georgia win in the 1993 Florida Citrus Bowl. The game marked Georgia's second CFP appearance in two years—they entered as the defending national champions after their victory in the 2022 College Football Playoff National Championship—and it was their third appearance overall. Ohio State made their fifth CFP appearance, having won the inaugural CFP national championship game in 2015. The game was Ohio State's debut in the Peach Bowl, while Georgia made their seventh all-time appearance.

In the game's first quarter, each team scored a touchdown, and Ohio State scored two more to begin the second quarter, giving them a 21–7 lead. Seventeen unanswered points by Georgia—two touchdowns and a field goal—gave them a three-point lead, but a 37-yard pass from quarterback C. J. Stroud to wide receiver Xavier Johnson with forty-nine seconds remaining in the second quarter gave Ohio State a 28–24 lead entering halftime. The Buckeyes scored ten unanswered points to begin the second half on an Emeka Egbuka touchdown and a Noah Ruggles field goal; these were the only scoring plays of the third quarter. The fourth quarter began with Georgia scoring eleven unanswered points of their own, bringing them within three; another Ruggles field goal pushed Ohio State's lead to six points with 2:43 remaining in the contest. Georgia retook the lead, 42–41, with fifty-four seconds left on a pass from Stetson Bennett to Adonai Mitchell. Ohio State's ensuing drive resulted in a 50-yard field goal attempt, which was missed wide left. The potential game-winning field goal was missed almost exactly as the new year began, leading many Georgia fans to call it the "Midnight Miracle". The game ended with a quarterback kneel and Georgia won the game, earning them a berth in the national championship where they defeated the TCU Horned Frogs 65–7.

== Background ==
The Peach Bowl was founded as a fundraiser by the Atlanta chapter of the Lions Club in 1968 and played its first game that same year. The game was originally hosted by Georgia Tech at Grant Field before moving to Atlanta–Fulton County Stadium. The Metro Atlanta Chamber of Commerce began organization of the game in 1986, and the location was once again moved to the Georgia Dome beginning in 1992. From 2006 to 2013, the game was known as the "Chick-fil-A Bowl" but resumed its present name in 2014. The game has been played at Mercedes-Benz Stadium in Atlanta since January 2018, following the demolition of the Georgia Dome in 2017. Upon the implementation of the College Football Playoff (CFP) for the 2014 season, the Peach Bowl hosted playoff semifinal games in 2016 and 2019.

=== College Football Playoff ===
The four teams competing in the playoff were chosen by the CFP selection committee, whose final rankings were released on December 4, 2022. The committee selected No. 1 Georgia of the Southeastern Conference, No. 2 Michigan of the Big Ten Conference, No. 3 TCU of the Big 12 Conference, and No. 4 Ohio State of the Big Ten Conference. Georgia and Michigan were champions of their respective conferences, while TCU lost in their conference championship game and Ohio State finished second in their division. Michigan and Georgia entered the playoff with undefeated 13–0 records while TCU entered 12–1 and Ohio State entered 11–1.

Semifinals
December 31 – Peach Bowl Mercedes-Benz Stadium, Atlanta
1	Georgia	42
4	Ohio State	41
December 31 – Fiesta Bowl State Farm Stadium, Glendale
2	Michigan	45
3	TCU	51

Championship
January 10 – National Championship SoFi Stadium, Inglewood
1	Georgia	65
3	TCU	7

== Teams ==
The game featured Georgia, undefeated champion of the SEC, and Ohio State, a one-loss team from the Big Ten selected at-large by the CFP committee. The game followed Georgia's win over LSU in the SEC Championship, while Ohio State did not compete in the Big Ten championship after losing their final regular-season game to Michigan. This was the second meeting between the two programs, with their only prior game resulting in a Georgia victory in the 1993 Florida Citrus Bowl.

=== Georgia ===
Georgia finished the regular season with an undefeated 12–0 record. Their schedule included wins over two ranked teams, Oregon and Tennessee. They clinched the SEC East division championship and a berth in the conference title game with a win over Mississippi State on November 12, and finished the regular season with a win over rivals Georgia Tech two weeks later. After their SEC championship win, they were selected to the CFP as the No. 1 seed.

This was Georgia's third CFP appearance and their second in two years; they entered as the defending national champions following their win in the 2022 College Football Playoff National Championship over Alabama the year prior. Their CFP debut came in the 2017–18 edition when they defeated Oklahoma in the Rose Bowl semifinal.

=== Ohio State ===
Ohio State finished the regular season with a record of 11–1. They defeated No. 5 Notre Dame to open the season and later defeated Penn State, their only other regular season ranked opponent, on the road by thirteen points. Their last regular season contest was a home matchup with No. 3 Michigan, which they lost. This gave Michigan the Big Ten East division championship and a berth in the Big Ten championship game. Despite the loss, and thanks in part to No. 4 USC's loss to No. 11 Utah in the Pac-12 Championship, Ohio State regained their spot in the CFP top four and were selected to the CFP as the No. 4 seed.

Ohio State made their fifth overall CFP appearance and their first since the 2020–21 edition, where they lost to Alabama in the national championship. The Buckeyes made their CFP debut in the inaugural edition of the CFP, in which they ended up winning the national championship over Oregon.

== Broadcast ==
The Peach Bowl was televised by ESPN, with the primary Saturday Night Football commentary team, Chris Fowler on play-by-play, Kirk Herbstreit as analyst, and Holly Rowe and Laura Rutledge on the sidelines. The ESPN Radio broadcast was commentated by Joe Tessitore, Greg McElroy, and Katie George.

ESPN aired its MegaCast coverage for both College Football Playoff semifinals and the National Championship Game; the primary telecast aired on ESPN while other channels in the ESPN family of networks aired alternate broadcasts. ESPN2 aired "Field Pass" with The Pat McAfee Show, which featured Pat McAfee along with Robert Griffin III, Taylor Lewan, and A. Q. Shipley, among others. Audio from the main telecast was played on both ESPNU, which aired Command Center, and ESPNews, which aired the SkyCast (a continuous feed from the skycam). The All-22 broadcast, on the ESPN app, was paired with audio from the ESPN Radio broadcast. The hometown radio broadcasts from each team were shown on the ESPN app as well; Ohio State's radio broadcast was commentated by Paul Keels, Jim Lachey, and Matt Andrews, while Georgia's featured Scott Howard, Eric Zeier, and D.J. Shockley. ESPN Deportes carried the Spanish language-broadcast, featuring Eduardo Varela, Pablo Viruega and Sebastian M. Christensen.

== Game summary ==
The game's officiating crew, representing the Pac-12 Conference, was led by referee Chris Coyte and umpire Greg Adams. The game was played indoors at Mercedes-Benz Stadium in Atlanta, Georgia, and began at 8:21 p.m. EST. Georgia was favored to win the game, with a spread of 6.5 points and an over–under of 62 points. The pregame coin toss was won by Georgia, who deferred their choice to the second half, thereby giving Ohio State possession of the ball to begin the game.

=== First half ===
Georgia placekicker Jack Podlesny began the game with the opening kickoff, which resulted in a touchback. Ohio State began their first offensive possession on their own 25-yard line and completed an 11-yard pass from C. J. Stroud to Marvin Harrison Jr. for a first down. A quarterback sack suffered by the Buckeyes on 3rd & 7 several plays later set up a punt on the next play, giving Georgia the ball for the first time. Like Ohio State, Georgia completed an 11-yard pass for a first down on their first snap, from Stetson Bennett to Adonai Mitchell. Another completion from Bennett to Mitchell moved them into Ohio State territory, and their drive ended on the Ohio State 29-yard line when Podlesny's 47-yard field goal attempt was missed wide to the left. Another Stroud-to-Harrison completion opened Ohio State's second drive, and three plays later, the Buckeyes scored a 31-yard passing touchdown to open the game's scoring. Georgia's second drive began with a loss of seven yards, but the Bulldogs gained back the yardage to gain a first down on their third play. Five plays later, they reached the end zone on a 25-yard touchdown pass from Bennett to Kenny McIntosh to tie the game. Another touchback followed, giving Ohio State the ball at their own 25-yard line. They faced 3rd & 1 early into the drive but converted on a 4-yard rush by Miyan Williams. Shortly after, they converted another 3rd & 1 with a 13-yard pass to Emeka Egbuka to conclude the first quarter.

The Buckeyes reached the red zone on the first play of the second quarter and, after a pass interference penalty was called against Georgia on 3rd & 6, scored their second touchdown to retake the lead. They quickly regained possession after Bennett's pass on the first play of Georgia's drive was intercepted by Steele Chambers and returned to the Georgia 30-yard line. The Buckeyes scored in three plays on a 16-yard pass from Stroud to Harrison, stretching their lead to 21–7. Georgia responded with a quick scoring drive of their own: a 21-yard rush and a 47-yard pass in their first three plays put them on the Ohio State 11-yard line, from where Kendall Milton scored a rushing touchdown. The game was tied a short time later; following the game's first three-and-out by Ohio State, the Bulldogs rushed for 52 yards on the first play of their next drive and scored a touchdown two plays later. Podlesny's extra point with 6:07 remaining tied the game at 21 points apiece. Georgia took the lead with a 32-yard field goal on their next drive following a Buckeye three-and-out. Following a touchback, Ohio State retook possession at their own 25-yard line and reached midfield in two plays. After another two plays, they retook the lead on a 37-yard touchdown pass from Stroud to Xavier Johnson. Georgia threw two incomplete passes before taking a knee to end the first half.

=== Second half ===
Georgia received possession of the ball to begin the second half but went three-and-out and punted just over one minute in. Ohio State completed a 25-yard pass to reach Georgia territory on their first offensive snap of the quarter and scored a touchdown five plays later on a 10-yard pass from Stroud to Egbuka. The extra point was successful, giving Ohio State a 35–24 lead. The game's next three possessions all resulted in punts, with each team recording one three-in-out in the span. Ohio State resumed possession at their own 34-yard line with 3:50 to play in the quarter. After a holding penalty on their first play, they made up the yardage with a pass interference called against Georgia's Kelee Ringo and shortly afterwards reached the red zone with gains of 17 and 27 yards. They concluded the drive with a 25-yard field goal by Noah Ruggles, pushing their lead to fourteen points. Georgia regained the ball with 31 seconds left in the quarter and ran one play, a 17-yard pass from Bennett to McIntosh, before time expired.

Georgia's drive continued as the fourth quarter began; they reached Ohio State territory after two additional plays and entered the red zone the following play after a 26-yard gain. Shortly afterwards, the Bulldogs faced 4th & 6 from the Ohio State 13-yard line, which they converted after Bennett passed to tight end Brock Bowers for a 6-yard gain. A sack on the ensuing second down play set them back to the 13-yard line, from where Podlesny made a 31-yard field goal to narrow his team's deficit to eleven. An Ohio State three-and-out was quickly followed by a 76-yard touchdown pass from Bennett to Arian Smith, narrowing the Ohio State lead to three points. After picking up several first downs on their ensuing drive, the Buckeyes offense faced 3rd & 8 at the Georgia 32-yard line, which they converted with a 9-yard pass. The drive concluded with a 48-yard field goal, which made the score 41–35. The ensuing kickoff was returned by Kearis Jackson to the Georgia 28-yard line, and the Bulldogs' drive began with 2:36 remaining in the contest. Jackson was the receiver of a 35-yard pass completion four plays into the drive, which put Georgia on the Ohio State 15-yard line. Two plays later, Bennett passed to Mitchell for a 10-yard touchdown, and Podlesny's extra point gave Georgia the lead, 42–41. Fifty-four seconds remained when Ohio State retook possession at their own 25-yard line; they reached midfield in three plays. Starting with 1st & 10 at the Georgia 31-yard line, the Buckeyes ran three plays for a net loss of one yard. Ruggles attempted a field goal from 50 yards on fourth down, and the kick was missed wide left with three seconds left. Georgia took a knee on the final play of the game, securing their one-point victory.

=== Scoring summary ===
College Football Playoff Semifinal at the 2022 Chick-fil-A Peach Bowl

Quarter	1	2	3	4	Total
No. 4 Ohio State	7	21	10	3	41
No. 1 Georgia	7	17	0	18	42

at Mercedes-Benz Stadium • Atlanta, Georgia

- Date: December 31, 2022
- Game time: 8:00 p.m. EST (Kickoff at 8:21 p.m. EST)
- Game weather: n/a (game played indoors)
- Game attendance: 79,330
- Referee: Chris Coyte (Pac-12)
- TV announcers (ESPN): Chris Fowler (play-by-play), Kirk Herbstreit (analyst), Holly Rowe and Laura Rutledge (sidelines)
- Box score

Scoring summary

Quarter	Time	Drive			Team	Scoring information	Score	
Quarter	Time	Plays	Yards	TOP	Team	Scoring information	Ohio State	Georgia
1	8:16	4	71	2:15	Ohio State	Marvin Harrison Jr. 31-yard touchdown reception from C. J. Stroud, Noah Ruggles kick good	7	0
1	3:15	8	75	5:01	Georgia	Kenny McIntosh 25-yard touchdown reception from Stetson Bennett, Jack Podlesny kick good	7	7
2	12:30	11	75	5:45	Ohio State	Miyan Williams 2-yard touchdown run, Noah Ruggles kick good	14	7
2	10:56	3	30	1:24	Ohio State	Marvin Harrison Jr. 16-yard touchdown reception from C. J. Stroud, Noah Ruggles kick good	21	7
2	9:16	4	75	1:40	Georgia	Kendall Milton 11-yard touchdown run, Jack Podlesny kick good	21	14
2	6:07	3	62	1:34	Georgia	Stetson Bennett 3-yard touchdown run, Jack Podlesny kick good	21	21
2	1:44	8	53	2:28	Georgia	32-yard field goal by Jack Podlesny	21	24
2	0:49	4	75	0:55	Ohio State	Xavier Johnson 37-yard touchdown reception from C. J. Stroud, Noah Ruggles kick good	28	24
3	10:37	6	70	3:19	Ohio State	Emeka Egbuka 10-yard touchdown reception from C. J. Stroud, Noah Ruggles kick good	35	24
3	0:31	7	59	3:19	Ohio State	32-yard field goal by Noah Ruggles	38	24
4	10:14	12	62	5:17	Georgia	31-yard field goal by Jack Podlesny	38	27
4	8:41	1	76	0:10	Georgia	Arian Smith 76-yard touchdown reception from Stetson Bennett, 2-point pass good (Stetson Bennett to Ladd McConkey)	38	35
4	2:43	11	45	5:58	Ohio State	48-yard field goal by Noah Ruggles	41	35
4	0:54	5	72	1:49	Georgia	Adonai Mitchell 10-yard touchdown reception from Stetson Bennett, Jack Podlesny kick good	41	42
"TOP" = time of possession. For other American football terms, see Glossary of American football.							41	42

== Statistics ==
Team statistical comparison
Statistic	Ohio State	Georgia
First downs	24	22
First downs rushing	5	6
First downs passing	17	15
First downs penalty	2	0
Third down efficiency	4–12	2–10
Fourth down efficiency	0–0	1–1
Total plays–net yards	66–467	60–533
Rushing attempts–net yards	32–119	26–135
Yards per rush	3.7	5.2
Yards passing	348	398
Pass completions–attempts	23–34	23–34
Interceptions thrown	0	1
Punt returns–total yards	0–0	1–22
Kickoff returns–total yards	1–15	2–50
Punts–average yardage	5–43.4	2–44.5
Fumbles–lost	1–0	1–0
Penalties–yards	4–24	4–45
Time of possession	32:36	27:24

Ohio State statistics
Buckeyes passing
	C–A	Yds	TD–INT
C. J. Stroud	23–34	348	4–0
Buckeyes rushing
	Car	Yds	TD
Dallan Hayden	9	43	0
C. J. Stroud	12	34	0
Xavier Johnson	6	28	0
Miyan Williams	3	8	1
Emeka Egbuka	2	6	0
Buckeyes receiving
	Rec	Yds	TD
Emeka Egbuka	8	112	1
Marvin Harrison Jr.	5	106	2
Julian Fleming	5	71	0
Xavier Johnson	3	43	1
Joe Royer	1	9	0
Cade Stover	1	7	0

Georgia statistics
Bulldogs passing
	C–A	Yds	TD–INT
Stetson Bennett	23–34	398	3–1
Bulldogs rushing
	Car	Yds	TD
Kenny McIntosh	5	70	0
Daijun Edwards	8	58	0
Kendall Milton	3	26	1
Brock Bowers	1	1	0
Stetson Bennett	7	−18	1
Bulldogs receiving
	Rec	Yds	TD
Arian Smith	3	129	1
Brock Bowers	4	64	0
Kenny McIntosh	5	56	1
Adonai Mitchell	3	43	1
Kearis Jackson	1	35	0
Marcus Rosemy-Jacksaint	2	34	0
Dominick Blaylock	1	20	0
Daijun Edwards	1	9	0
Darnell Washington	1	9	0
Ladd McConkey	2	−1	0

== Aftermath ==
The win improved Georgia to 14–0, and they advanced to the 2023 College Football Playoff National Championship, where they faced Fiesta Bowl winners TCU. Georgia quarterback Stetson Bennett and safety Javon Bullard were named the game's offensive and defensive most valuable players, respectively. Georgia went on to defeat TCU, 65–7, to win the national championship.

The game recorded 22.5 million viewers. Since the missed field goal at the end of the game was attempted almost exactly at midnight of the new year, the ball landing at almost exactly midnight, the nickname "Midnight Miracle" was used by some Georgia fans to describe the game.

== See also ==
- 2022 Celebration Bowl, contested at the same venue on December 17
