= 2022–23 College Football Playoff =

College football tournament

- Season: 2022
- Dates: December 31, 2022 – January 9, 2023
- Teams invited: (1) Georgia; (2) Michigan; (3) TCU; (4) Ohio State
- Venues: Mercedes-Benz Stadium; SoFi Stadium; State Farm Stadium
- Champions: Georgia (2nd CFP title, 4th overall title)

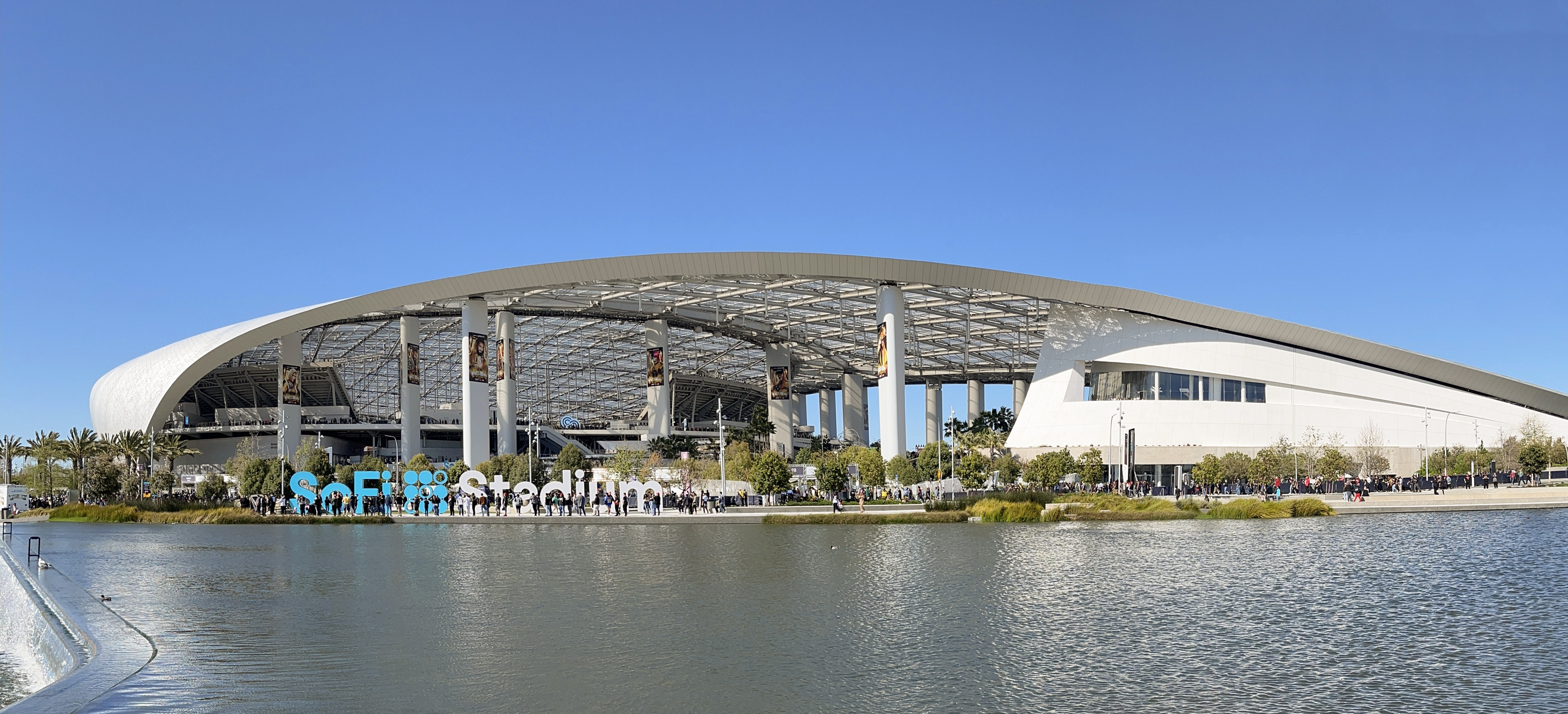
SoFi Stadium in Inglewood, California, hosted the College Football Playoff National Championship.

The 2022–23 College Football Playoff was a single-elimination postseason tournament that determined the national champion of the 2022 college football season. It was the ninth edition of the College Football Playoff (CFP) and involved the top four teams in the country as ranked by the College Football Playoff poll playing in two semifinals, with the winners of each advancing to the national championship game. The four teams invited to participate were No. 1 Georgia from the Southeastern Conference, No. 2 Michigan from the Big Ten Conference, No. 3 TCU from the Big 12 Conference, and No. 4 Ohio State, also from the Big Ten Conference. As of 2025, this is the only edition of the College Football Playoff to feature both Michigan and Ohio State.

The playoff bracket's semifinal games were held at the Peach Bowl and Fiesta Bowl on New Year's Eve, part of the season's slate of bowl games. Georgia defeated Ohio State by one point in the Peach Bowl semifinal and TCU defeated Michigan by six in the Fiesta Bowl game. By virtue of their wins, TCU and Georgia advanced to the national championship game, held on January 9 in Inglewood, California. Georgia's 58-point victory in the title game was the largest win in a CFP National Championship Game, the largest margin of victory in a title game, and at the time, was the largest margin of victory in any bowl game at the FBS level. Georgia became the first team since the 2012 Alabama Crimson Tide to repeat as national champions. They also became the third college football team to complete a 15–0 season in the modern era after the 2018 Clemson Tigers and the 2019 LSU Tigers. This was the fourth consecutive national championship won by a team from the SEC.

== Bracket ==
Semifinals
December 31 – Peach Bowl Mercedes-Benz Stadium, Atlanta
1	Georgia	42
4	Ohio State	41
December 31 – Fiesta Bowl State Farm Stadium, Glendale
2	Michigan	45
3	TCU	51

Championship
January 10 – National Championship SoFi Stadium, Inglewood
1	Georgia	65
3	TCU	7

== Selection and teams ==
The 2022–23 CFP selection committee was chaired by NC State athletic director Boo Corrigan. Its other members were Kentucky athletic director Mitch Barnhart, Wyoming athletic director Tom Burman, Colorado athletic director Rick George, Navy athletic director Chet Gladchuk Jr., former head coach Jim Grobe, Michigan athletic director Warde Manuel, former NFL player Will Shields, Kansas State athletic director Gene Taylor, former head coach Joe Taylor, mathematician and former NFL player John Urschel, former Sugar Bowl president Rod West, and former USA Today reporter Kelly Whiteside.

2022 College Football Playoff rankings top six progression
No.	Week 9	Week 10	Week 11	Week 12	Week 13	Final
1	Tennessee (8–0)	Georgia (9–0)	Georgia (10–0)	Georgia (11–0)	Georgia (12–0)	Georgia (13–0)
2	Ohio State (8–0)	Ohio State (9–0)	Ohio State (10–0)	Ohio State (11–0)	Michigan (12–0)	Michigan (13–0)
3	Georgia (8–0)	Michigan (9–0)	Michigan (10–0)	Michigan (11–0)	TCU (12–0)	TCU (12–1)
4	Clemson (8–0)	TCU (9–0)	TCU (10–0)	TCU (11–0)	USC (11–1)	Ohio State (11–1)
5	Michigan (8–0)	Tennessee (8–1)	Tennessee (9–1)	LSU (9–2)	Ohio State (11–1)	Alabama (10–2)
6	Alabama (7–1)	Oregon (8–1)	LSU (8–2)	USC (10–1)	Alabama (10–2)	Tennessee (10–2)

Key: Team increased ranking from previous week Team decreased ranking from previous week Team selected to College Football Playoff

== Playoff games ==
=== Semifinals ===
==== Fiesta Bowl ====
2022 Fiesta Bowl

Quarter	1	2	3	4	Total
No. 3 TCU	14	7	20	10	51
No. 2 Michigan	0	6	24	15	45

at State Farm Stadium • Glendale, Arizona

- Date: December 31, 2022
- Game time: 2:00 p.m. MST

==== Peach Bowl ====
2022 Peach Bowl

Quarter	1	2	3	4	Total
No. 4 Ohio State	7	21	10	3	41
No. 1 Georgia	7	17	0	18	42

at Mercedes-Benz Stadium • Atlanta, Georgia

- Date: December 31, 2022
- Game time: 8:00 p.m. EST

=== Championship game ===
2023 College Football Playoff National Championship

Quarter	1	2	3	4	Total
No. 3 TCU	7	0	0	0	7
No. 1 Georgia	17	21	14	13	65

at SoFi Stadium • Inglewood, California

- Date: January 9, 2023
- Game time: 4:30 p.m. PST
