= Xavier Johnson (American football) =

American football player (born 1999)

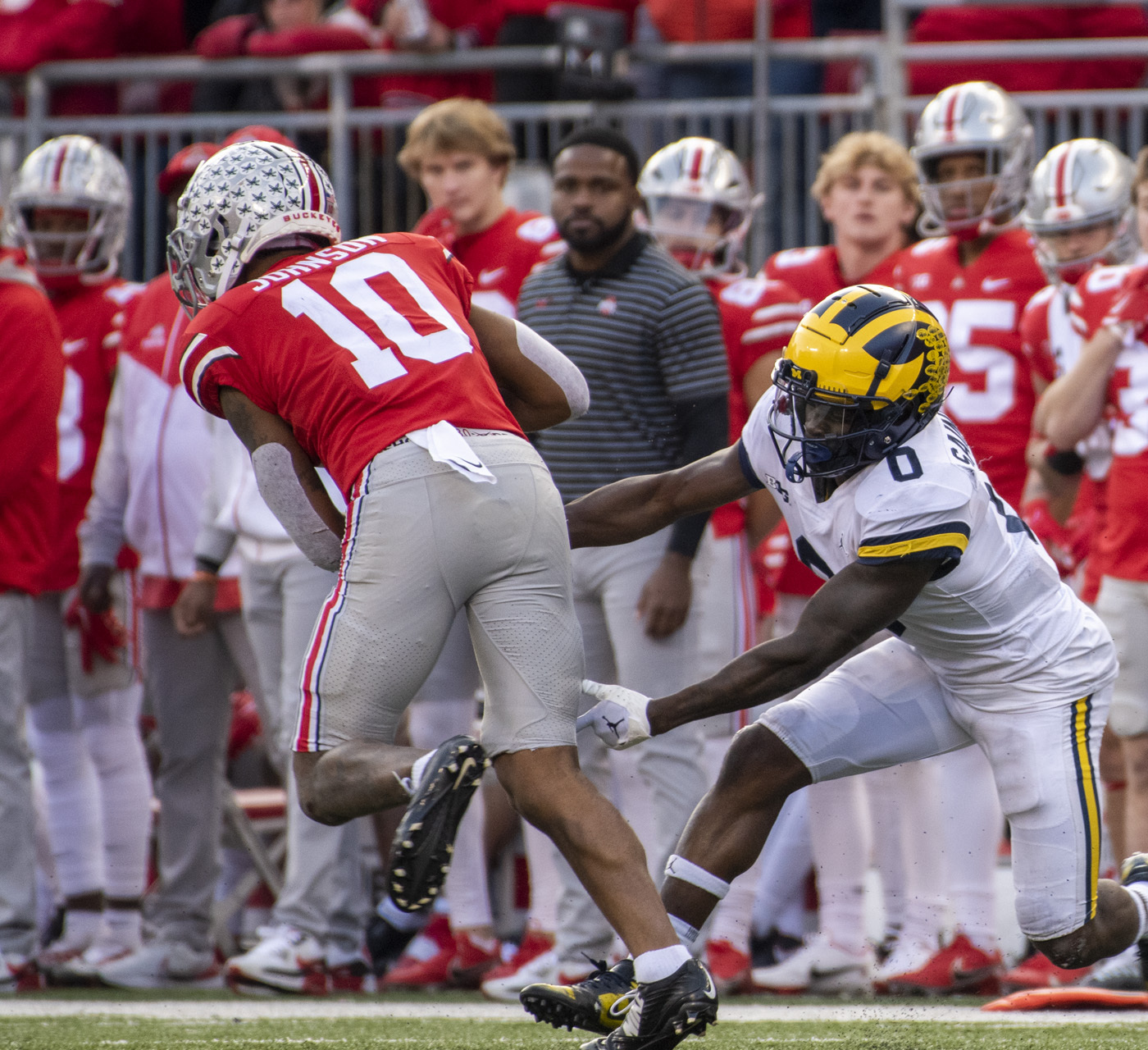

Rhode Island Breakers
- Position: Wide receiver
- Roster status: Unsigned draft pick

Personal information
- Born: May 11, 1999 (age 27); Cincinnati, Ohio, U.S.
- Listed height: 6 ft 1 in (1.85 m)
- Listed weight: 204 lb (93 kg)

Career information
- High school: Summit Country Day School (Cincinnati, Ohio)
- College: Ohio State (2018–2023)
- NFL draft: 2024: undrafted

Career history
- Buffalo Bills (2024)*; Houston Texans (2024)*; Cincinnati Bengals (2025)*; Rhode Island Breakers (2027-present)
- * Offseason or practice squad member only
- Stats at Pro Football Reference

Xavier Johnson (born May 11, 1999) is an American professional football wide receiver. He played college football for the Ohio State Buckeyes and was signed by the Buffalo Bills in 2024 as an undrafted free agent.

== Early life ==
Johnson grew up in Cincinnati, Ohio and attended Summit Country Day School. While at Summit, Johnson had 32 receptions for 766 yards and eight scores and while running the ball, he had 623 yards, 10 touchdowns and an average of 17.3 yards per carry. He was rated a three-star recruit and committed to play college football at Ohio State over offers from Bowling Green, Cincinnati, Iowa State, North Dakota State, and Ohio.

== College career ==
Johnson was recruited as a running back at Ohio State until his junior season when he was moved to wide receiver. During the 2022 season, he scored three touchdowns, one of which was a 24-yard touchdown reception during Ohio State's first game of the season against Notre Dame. During the 2022 Peach Bowl against Georgia, he caught a go-ahead 37-yard touchdown pass giving Ohio State a lead of 28-24 right before the half. On August 19, 2023, Johnson was named the Buckeyes' Block "O" jersey recipient and wore a No. 0 jersey for the 2023 season. In 2023, Johnson caught 13 passes for 178 yards and rushed 28 times for 190 yards.

== Professional career ==
Pre-draft measurables
Height	Weight	Arm length	Hand span	Wingspan	40-yard dash	10-yard split	20-yard split	20-yard shuttle	Three-cone drill	Vertical jump	Bench press
6 ft 0 3/4 in (1.85 m)	202 lb (92 kg)	32 3/8 in (0.82 m)	9 3/8 in (0.24 m)	6 ft 5 5/8 in (1.97 m)	4.64 s	1.59 s	2.68 s	4.33 s	7.00 s	36.0 in (0.91 m)	14 reps
All values from Pro Day

=== Buffalo Bills ===
After not being selected in the 2024 NFL draft, Johnson signed with the Buffalo Bills as an undrafted free agent. He was released as part of final roster cuts on August 27.

=== Houston Texans ===
On August 29, 2024, Johnson signed with the practice squad of the Houston Texans. He signed a reserve/future contract with Houston on January 21, 2025. On August 19, Johnson was waived by the Texans with an injury designation.

=== Cincinnati Bengals ===
On December 10, 2025, Johnson signed with the Cincinnati Bengals' practice squad. He signed a reserve/future contract with Cincinnati on January 5, 2026.

On August 30, 2026, Johnson was waived by the Bengals as a part of final roster cuts.
