= Xavier Truss =

American football player (born 2001)

No. 66 – Cleveland Browns
- Position: Offensive tackle
- Roster status: Practice squad

Personal information
- Born: July 13, 2001 (age 25); West Warwick, Rhode Island, U.S.
- Listed height: 6 ft 7 in (2.01 m)
- Listed weight: 320 lb (145 kg)

Career information
- High school: Bishop Hendricken (Warwick, Rhode Island)
- College: Georgia (2019–2024)
- NFL draft: 2025: undrafted

Career history
- Denver Broncos (2025)*; New Orleans Saints (2025); Cleveland Browns (2026)*; Philadelphia Eagles (2026)*; Cleveland Browns (2026–present)*
- * Offseason or practice squad member only

Awards and highlights
- 2× CFP national champion (2021, 2022); Second-team All-SEC (2023)

Career NFL statistics as of 2025
- Games played: 7
- Stats at Pro Football Reference

Xavier Doyle Truss (born July 13, 2001) is an American professional football offensive tackle for the Cleveland Browns of the National Football League (NFL). He played college football for the Georgia Bulldogs and was signed by the Denver Broncos as an undrafted free agent in 2025. He is the highest rated recruit in Rhode Island high school football history.

== Early life ==
Truss was born on July 13, 2001, in West Warwick, Rhode Island. He played high school football for Bishop Hendricken High School where he was selected to represent the East in the 2019 All-American Bowl, he was also invited to the All-American high school combine in San Antonio. In his junior year he was a Providence First-Team All-State selection, while leading Bishop Hendricken to back-to-back Rhode Island State Super Bowl appearances, winning in 2018.

== College career ==
In 2019, Truss started his freshman year with the Bulldogs by being redshirted; seeing action against Murray State, Arkansas State, and Georgia Tech.

In 2020, as a redshirt freshman, Truss started at tackle in Georgia's Chick-fil-A Peach Bowl win over Cincinnati. He also played as a reserve offensive linemen in games against Arkansas, Auburn, Tennessee, USC, and Missouri.

In 2021, entering his sophomore year, Truss made the transition from tackle to guard. He played in reserve in all fifteen of Georgia's games, playing the most out of his entire career at the time against Tennessee.

In 2022, Truss was projected to battle for a starting spot on the offensive line over the offseason, Truss won the battle ahead of the 2022 season beating redshirt sophomore Devin Willock. Truss started in eleven of twelve games, only missing the team's games against Tennessee due to injury. He started in the team's win over TCU in the 2023 College Football Playoff National Championship at left guard as they went back-to-back.

== Professional career ==
Pre-draft measurables
Height	Weight	Arm length	Hand span	Wingspan	40-yard dash	10-yard split	20-yard split	20-yard shuttle	Three-cone drill	Vertical jump	Broad jump
6 ft 7 1/8 in (2.01 m)	309 lb (140 kg)	33 in (0.84 m)	10 1/2 in (0.27 m)	6 ft 10 7/8 in (2.11 m)	5.24 s	1.82 s	3.02 s	5.01 s	7.82 s	26.0 in (0.66 m)	8 ft 7 in (2.62 m)
All values from NFL Combine/Pro Day

=== Denver Broncos ===
After going unselected in the 2025 NFL draft, Truss signed with the Denver Broncos as an undrafted free agent. On August 25, 2025, Truss was waived by the Broncos.

=== New Orleans Saints ===
On August 27, 2025, Truss was claimed off waivers by the New Orleans Saints. Truss made seven appearances for New Orleans during the regular season.

On August 29, 2026, Truss was waived by the Saints as a part of preliminary roster cuts.

=== Cleveland Browns (first stint) ===
On September 15, 2026, Truss signed with the Cleveland Browns' practice squad. On October 6, he was released.

=== Philadelphia Eagles ===
On October 13, 2026, Truss was signed to the Philadelphia Eagles practice squad. On October 27, he was released.

=== Cleveland Browns (second stint) ===
On November 3, 2026, Truss signed with the Cleveland Browns practice squad again.

== Personal life ==
Truss is the son of Steve and Gina Truss, and has two younger sisters.
