= Kearis Jackson =

American football player (born 1999)

Profile
- Position: Wide receiver

Personal information
- Born: December 9, 1999 (age 26); Fort Valley, Georgia, U.S.
- Listed height: 5 ft 11 in (1.80 m)
- Listed weight: 196 lb (89 kg)

Career information
- High school: Peach County (Fort Valley)
- College: Georgia (2018–2022)
- NFL draft: 2023: undrafted

Career history
- Tennessee Titans (2023); New York Giants (2024)*; Houston Texans (2025)*; Edmonton Elks (2025)
- * Offseason or practice squad member only

Awards and highlights
- 2× CFP national champion (2021, 2022); Second-team All-SEC (2022)

Career NFL statistics
- Return yards: 48
- Stats at Pro Football Reference

Kearis Jamarcus Jackson (born December 9, 1999) is an American professional football wide receiver who is a free agent. He played college football for the Georgia Bulldogs. He has previously played in the National Football League (NFL) for the Tennessee Titans.

== Early life ==
Jackson attended Peach County. In his senior year, Jackson caught 9 touchdowns on 47 receptions for 852 yards. This helped him become a consensus 4-star recruit. His career totals came to 26 receiving touchdowns for 2508 yards with 161 catches. Jackson had offers from Alabama, Auburn, Florida, and Ohio State, but he decided to commit to Georgia.

== College career ==
Jackson would redshirt his first year on campus. He made his first and only appearance in a blowout of Middle Tennessee State where he got 6 yards on a rushing attempt.

Jackson played sparingly in his second season. He appeared in 4 games and caught 5 passes for 79 yards. He had 2 rushing attempts for 10 yards.

In his third season, Jackson's playing time significantly increased. He appeared in every game of the season and had 514 yards on 36 catches, with three of those catches being touchdowns. His best game was against Auburn where he recorded 147 yards on 9 receptions. His first career touchdown came the following week against Tennessee.

In 2021, Jackson was named to the preseason third team All-SEC. During the season, Jackson dealt with injuries and he didn't make his first appearance until senior day against Charleston Southern. Jackson helped lead the Bulldogs to their first National Championship since 1980 with a 33–18 victory over Alabama. At the season's end, Jackson announced he would return for another season.

== Professional career ==
Pre-draft measurables
Height	Weight	Arm length	Hand span	40-yard dash	10-yard split	20-yard split	Broad jump
5 ft 11 3/8 in (1.81 m)	196 lb (89 kg)	31 1/4 in (0.79 m)	9 3/8 in (0.24 m)	4.55 s	1.52 s	2.62 s	10 ft 6 in (3.20 m)
All values from NFL Combine

=== Tennessee Titans ===
Jackson was signed by the Tennessee Titans as an undrafted free agent on May 15, 2023. He made the Titans 53-man roster as the team's punt returner. Jackson suffered an ankle injury in practice and was placed on injured reserve on September 22.

Jackson was waived by Tennessee on August 27, 2024.

=== New York Giants ===
On October 1, 2024, Jackson was signed to the New York Giants' practice squad.

=== Houston Texans ===
On January 24, 2025, Jackson signed a reserve/future contract with the Houston Texans. He was waived by the Texans on March 17.

=== Edmonton Elks ===
The Edmonton Elks announced that they had added Jackson on May 8, 2025. He made two appearances for Edmonton, recording three receptions for 24 yards. On February 16, 2026, it was announced that Jackson had been released by the Elks.

== Career statistics ==
College statistics
Year	Team	GP	Receiving			
Year	Team	GP	Rec	Yds	Avg	TD
2018	Georgia	4	–	–	–	–
2019	Georgia	11	5	79	15.8	0
2020	Georgia	10	36	514	14.3	3
2021	Georgia	15	16	194	12.1	1
2022	Georgia	15	21	320	15.2	0
Career		55	78	1,107	14.2	4
