= 2022–23 NCAA football bowl games =

Series of college football bowl games following the 2022 season

- Season: 2022
- Number of bowls: 43 (Note: 42 FBS bowl games, including the College Football Playoff National Championship Game, and 1 FCS bowl game.)
- All-star games: 6
- Bowl games: December 16, 2022 – January 9, 2023 (Note: Dates exclude all-star games.)
- National Championship: 2023 College Football Playoff; National Championship
- Location of Championship: SoFi Stadium; Inglewood, California
- Champions: Georgia Bulldogs
- Bowl Challenge Cup winner: MAC
Bowl record by conference
Conference	Bowls	Record	Number of teams in final AP poll
ACC	9	5–4 (0.556)	3
American	7	4–3 (0.571)	1
Big 12	9	2–7 (0.222)	3
Big Ten	9	5–4 (0.556)	3
C–USA	6	3–3 (0.500)	0
MAC	6	4–2 (0.667)	0
Mountain West	7	3–4 (0.429)	1
Pac-12	7	3–4 (0.429)	6
SEC	12	7–5 (0.583)	6
Sun Belt	7	3–4 (0.429)	1
Independent	5	3–2 (0.600)	1

The 2022–23 NCAA football bowl games were a series of college football games played to complete the 2022 NCAA Division I FBS football season. Team-competitive games began in mid-December and concluded with the 2023 College Football Playoff National Championship on January 9, 2023, which was won by the Georgia Bulldogs. The all-star portion of the schedule began on January 14 and concluded on February 25, 2023.

== Schedule ==
The schedule for the 2022–23 bowl games is below. All times are EST (UTC−5). Note that Division II bowls and Division III bowls are not included here. The bowl schedule was released May 26, 2022.

=== College Football Playoff and National Championship Game ===
The College Football Playoff system is used to determine a national championship of Division I FBS college football. A 13-member committee of experts ranked the top 25 teams in the nation after each of the last seven weeks of the regular season. The top four teams in the final ranking are then seeded in a single-elimination semifinal round, with the winners advancing to the National Championship game.

The semifinal games for the 2022 season were the Fiesta Bowl and the Peach Bowl. Both were played on December 31, 2022, as part of a yearly rotation of three pairs of two bowls, commonly referred to as the New Year's Six bowl games. The winners advanced to the 2023 College Football Playoff National Championship on January 9, 2023.

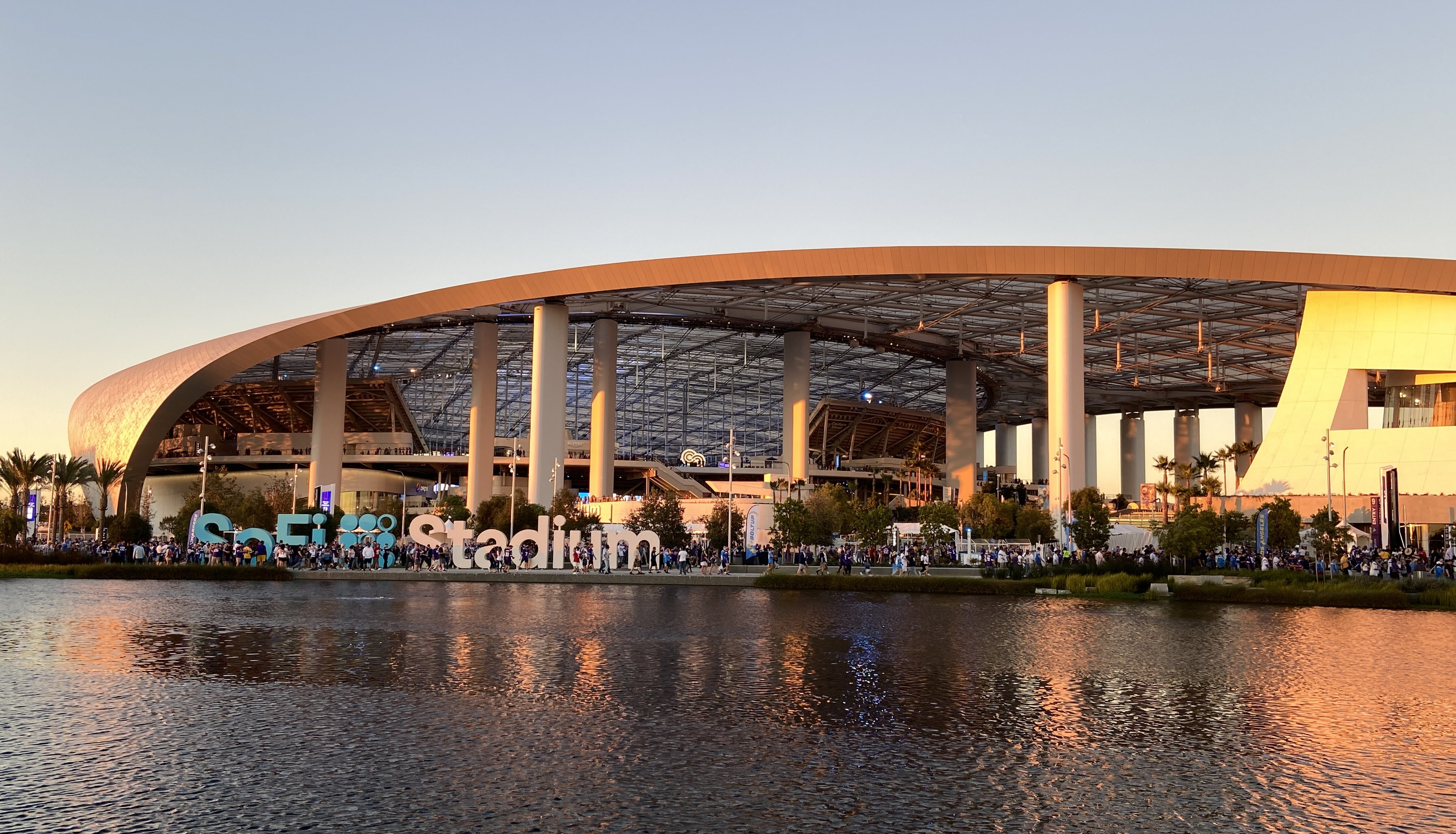
SoFi Stadium, site of the National Championship game

Semifinals
December 31 – Peach Bowl Mercedes-Benz Stadium, Atlanta
1	Georgia	42
4	Ohio State	41
December 31 – Fiesta Bowl State Farm Stadium, Glendale
2	Michigan	45
3	TCU	51

Championship
January 10 – National Championship SoFi Stadium, Inglewood
1	Georgia	65
3	TCU	7

Each of the games in the following table was televised by ESPN.

Date	Time (EST)	Game	Site	Teams	Affiliations	Results
Dec. 30	8:00 p.m.	Orange Bowl	Hard Rock Stadium; Miami Gardens, Florida	No. 6 Tennessee Volunteers (10–2); No. 7 Clemson Tigers (11–2)	SEC; ACC	Tennessee 31; Clemson 14
Dec. 31	12:00 p.m.	Sugar Bowl	Caesars Superdome; New Orleans, Louisiana	No. 5 Alabama Crimson Tide (10–2); No. 9 Kansas State Wildcats (10–3)	SEC; Big 12	Alabama 45; Kansas State 20
Dec. 31	4:00 p.m.	Fiesta Bowl (Playoff Semifinal Game)	State Farm Stadium; Glendale, Arizona	No. 3 TCU Horned Frogs (12–1); No. 2 Michigan Wolverines (13–0)	Big 12; Big Ten	TCU 51; Michigan 45
Dec. 31	8:00 p.m.	Peach Bowl (Playoff Semifinal Game)	Mercedes-Benz Stadium; Atlanta, Georgia	No. 1 Georgia Bulldogs (13–0); No. 4 Ohio State Buckeyes (11–1)	SEC; Big Ten	Georgia 42; Ohio State 41
Jan. 2	1:00 p.m.	Cotton Bowl Classic	AT&T Stadium; Arlington, Texas	No. 16 Tulane Green Wave (11–2); No. 10 USC Trojans (11–2)	American; Pac-12	Tulane 46; USC 45
Jan. 2	5:00 p.m.	Rose Bowl	Rose Bowl; Pasadena, California	No. 11 Penn State Nittany Lions (10–2); No. 8 Utah Utes (10–3)	Big Ten; Pac-12	Penn State 35; Utah 21
Jan. 9	7:30 p.m.	College Football Playoff National Championship (Fiesta Bowl winner vs. Peach Bowl winner)	SoFi Stadium; Inglewood, California	No. 1 Georgia Bulldogs (14–0); No. 3 TCU Horned Frogs (13–1)	SEC; Big 12	Georgia 65; TCU 7

=== Non CFP bowl games ===
==== Bowl changes ====
- The Bahamas Bowl is now sponsored by HomeTown Lenders.
- The game formerly known as the Outback Bowl was renamed as the ReliaQuest Bowl, following the end of sponsorship by Outback Steakhouse.
- The Cure Bowl is now sponsored by Duluth Trading Company.
- The Fiesta Bowl is now sponsored by Vrbo.
- The Pinstripe Bowl is now sponsored by Bad Boy Mowers.
- The Citrus Bowl is now sponsored by Kellogg's through its Cheez-It brand.
- The Frisco Football Classic was not played, as it was a temporary replacement to accommodate all 84 bowl-eligible teams of the 2021 NCAA Division I FBS football season.

==== Bowl schedule ====
Rankings are per the final CFP rankings that were released on December 4.

Date	Time (EST)	Game	Site	Television	Teams	Affiliations	Results
Dec. 16	11:30 a.m.	Bahamas Bowl	Thomas Robinson Stadium; Nassau, Bahamas	ESPN	UAB Blazers (6–6); Miami (OH) RedHawks (6–6)	C–USA; MAC	UAB 24; Miami (OH) 20
Dec. 16	3:00 p.m.	Cure Bowl	Exploria Stadium; Orlando, Florida	ESPN	No. 24 Troy Trojans (11–2); No. 25 UTSA Roadrunners (11–2)	Sun Belt; C–USA	Troy 18; UTSA 12
Dec. 17	11:00 a.m.	Fenway Bowl	Fenway Park; Boston, Massachusetts	ESPN	Louisville Cardinals (7–5); Cincinnati Bearcats (9–3)	ACC; American	Louisville 24; Cincinnati 7
Dec. 17	2:30 p.m.	Las Vegas Bowl	Allegiant Stadium; Paradise, Nevada	ESPN	No. 14 Oregon State Beavers (9–3); Florida Gators (6–6)	Pac-12; SEC	Oregon State 30; Florida 3
Dec. 17	3:30 p.m.	LA Bowl	SoFi Stadium; Inglewood, California	ABC	Fresno State Bulldogs (9–4); Washington State Cougars (7–5)	MWC; Pac-12	Fresno State 29; Washington State 6
Dec. 17	5:45 p.m.	LendingTree Bowl	Hancock Whitney Stadium; Mobile, Alabama	ESPN	Southern Miss Golden Eagles (6–6); Rice Owls (5–7)	Sun Belt; C–USA	Southern Miss 38; Rice 24
Dec. 17	7:30 p.m.	New Mexico Bowl	University Stadium; Albuquerque, New Mexico	ABC	BYU Cougars (7–5); SMU Mustangs (7–5)	Independent; American	BYU 24; SMU 23
Dec. 17	9:15 p.m.	Frisco Bowl	Toyota Stadium; Frisco, Texas	ESPN	Boise State Broncos (9–4); North Texas Mean Green (7–6)	MWC; C–USA	Boise State 35; North Texas 32
Dec. 19	2:30 p.m.	Myrtle Beach Bowl	Brooks Stadium; Conway, South Carolina	ESPN	Marshall Thundering Herd (8–4); UConn Huskies (6–6)	Sun Belt; Independent	Marshall 28; UConn 14
Dec. 20	3:30 p.m.	Famous Idaho Potato Bowl	Albertsons Stadium; Boise, Idaho	ESPN	Eastern Michigan Eagles (8–4); San Jose State Spartans (7–4)	MAC; MWC	Eastern Michigan 41; San Jose State 27
Dec. 20	7:30 p.m.	Boca Raton Bowl	FAU Stadium; Boca Raton, Florida	ESPN	Toledo Rockets (8–5); Liberty Flames (8–4)	MAC; Independent	Toledo 21; Liberty 19
Dec. 21	9:00 p.m.	New Orleans Bowl	Caesars Superdome; New Orleans, Louisiana	ESPN	Western Kentucky Hilltoppers (8–5); South Alabama Jaguars (10–2)	C–USA; Sun Belt	Western Kentucky 44; South Alabama 23
Dec. 22	7:30 p.m.	Armed Forces Bowl	Amon G. Carter Stadium; Fort Worth, Texas	ESPN	Air Force Falcons (9–3); Baylor Bears (6–6)	MWC; Big 12	Air Force 30; Baylor 15
Dec. 23	3:00 p.m.	Independence Bowl	Independence Stadium; Shreveport, Louisiana	ESPN	Houston Cougars (7–5); Louisiana Ragin' Cajuns (6–6)	American; Sun Belt	Houston 23; Louisiana 16
Dec. 23	6:30 p.m.	Gasparilla Bowl	Raymond James Stadium; Tampa, Florida	ESPN	Wake Forest Demon Deacons (7–5); Missouri Tigers (6–6)	ACC; SEC	Wake Forest 27; Missouri 17
Dec. 24	8:00 p.m.	Hawaii Bowl	Clarence T. C. Ching Athletics Complex; Honolulu, Hawaii	ESPN	Middle Tennessee Blue Raiders (7–5); San Diego State Aztecs (7–5)	C–USA; MWC	Middle Tennessee 25; San Diego State 23
Dec. 26	2:30 p.m.	Quick Lane Bowl	Ford Field; Detroit, Michigan	ESPN	New Mexico State Aggies (6–6); Bowling Green Falcons (6–6)	Independent; MAC	New Mexico State 24; Bowling Green 19
Dec. 27	12:00 p.m.	Camellia Bowl	Cramton Bowl; Montgomery, Alabama	ESPN	Buffalo Bulls (6–6); Georgia Southern Eagles (6–6)	MAC; Sun Belt	Buffalo 23; Georgia Southern 21
Dec. 27	3:15 p.m.	First Responder Bowl	Gerald J. Ford Stadium; University Park, Texas	ESPN	Memphis Tigers (6–6); Utah State Aggies (6–6)	American; MWC	Memphis 38; Utah State 10
Dec. 27	6:45 p.m.	Birmingham Bowl	Protective Stadium; Birmingham, Alabama	ESPN	East Carolina Pirates (7–5); Coastal Carolina Chanticleers (9–3)	American; Sun Belt	East Carolina 53; Coastal Carolina 29
Dec. 27	10:15 p.m.	Guaranteed Rate Bowl	Chase Field; Phoenix, Arizona	ESPN	Wisconsin Badgers (6–6); Oklahoma State Cowboys (7–5)	Big Ten; Big 12	Wisconsin 24; Oklahoma State 17
Dec. 28	2:00 p.m.	Military Bowl	Navy–Marine Corps Memorial Stadium; Annapolis, Maryland	ESPN	Duke Blue Devils (8–4); UCF Knights (9–4)	ACC; American	Duke 30; UCF 13
Dec. 28	5:30 p.m.	Liberty Bowl	Simmons Bank Liberty Stadium; Memphis, Tennessee	ESPN	Arkansas Razorbacks (6–6); Kansas Jayhawks (6–6)	SEC; Big 12	Arkansas 55; Kansas 53 (3OT)
Dec. 28	8:00 p.m.	Holiday Bowl	Petco Park; San Diego, California	Fox	No. 15 Oregon Ducks (9–3); North Carolina Tar Heels (9–4)	Pac-12; ACC	Oregon 28; North Carolina 27
Dec. 28	9:00 p.m.	Texas Bowl	NRG Stadium; Houston, Texas	ESPN	Texas Tech Red Raiders (7–5); Ole Miss Rebels (8–4)	Big 12; SEC	Texas Tech 42; Ole Miss 25
Dec. 29	2:00 p.m.	Pinstripe Bowl	Yankee Stadium; The Bronx, New York	ESPN	Minnesota Golden Gophers (8–4); Syracuse Orange (7–5)	Big Ten; ACC	Minnesota 28; Syracuse 20
Dec. 29	5:30 p.m.	Cheez-It Bowl	Camping World Stadium; Orlando, Florida	ESPN	No. 13 Florida State Seminoles (9–3); Oklahoma Sooners (6–6)	ACC; Big 12	Florida State 35; Oklahoma 32
Dec. 29	9:00 p.m.	Alamo Bowl	Alamodome; San Antonio, Texas	ESPN	No. 12 Washington Huskies (10–2); No. 20 Texas Longhorns (8–4)	Pac-12; Big 12	Washington 27; Texas 20
Dec. 30	12:00 p.m.	Duke's Mayo Bowl	Bank of America Stadium; Charlotte, North Carolina	ESPN	Maryland Terrapins (7–5); No. 23 NC State Wolfpack (8–4)	Big Ten; ACC	Maryland 16; NC State 12
Dec. 30	2:00 p.m.	Sun Bowl	Sun Bowl; El Paso, Texas	CBS	Pittsburgh Panthers (8–4); No. 18 UCLA Bruins (9–3)	ACC; Pac-12	Pittsburgh 37; UCLA 35
Dec. 30	3:30 p.m.	Gator Bowl	TIAA Bank Field; Jacksonville, Florida	ESPN	No. 21 Notre Dame Fighting Irish (8–4); No. 19 South Carolina Gamecocks (8–4)	Independent; SEC	Notre Dame 45; South Carolina 38
Dec. 30	4:30 p.m.	Arizona Bowl	Arizona Stadium; Tucson, Arizona	Barstool; Sports	Ohio Bobcats (9–4); Wyoming Cowboys (7–5)	MAC; MWC	Ohio 30; Wyoming 27 (OT)
Dec. 31	12:00 p.m.	Music City Bowl	Nissan Stadium; Nashville, Tennessee	ABC	Iowa Hawkeyes (7–5); Kentucky Wildcats (7–5)	Big Ten; SEC	Iowa 21; Kentucky 0
Jan. 2	12:00 p.m.	ReliaQuest Bowl	Raymond James Stadium; Tampa, Florida	ESPN2	No. 22 Mississippi State Bulldogs (8–4); Illinois Fighting Illini (8–4)	SEC; Big Ten	Mississippi State 19; Illinois 10
Jan. 2	1:00 p.m.	Citrus Bowl	Camping World Stadium; Orlando, Florida	ABC	No. 17 LSU Tigers (9–4); Purdue Boilermakers (8–5)	SEC; Big Ten	LSU 63; Purdue 7

=== FCS bowl game ===
The Football Championship Subdivision (FCS) has one bowl game. The FCS also has a postseason bracket tournament that culminates in the 2023 NCAA Division I Football Championship Game.

Date	Time (EST)	Game	Site	Television	Participants	Affiliations	Results
Dec. 17	12:00 p.m.	Celebration Bowl	Mercedes-Benz Stadium; Atlanta, Georgia	ABC	North Carolina Central Eagles (9–2); Jackson State Tigers (12–0)	MEAC; SWAC	North Carolina Central 41; Jackson State 34 (OT)

=== All-star games ===
Each of these games features college seniors, or players whose college football eligibility is ending, who are individually invited by game organizers. These games are scheduled to follow the team-competitive bowls, to allow players selected from bowl teams to participate. The all-star games may include some players from non-FBS programs.

Date	Time (EST)	Game	Site	Television	Participants	Results	Ref.
Jan. 14	12:00 p.m.	Hula Bowl	FBC Mortgage Stadium; Orlando, Florida	CBS Sports Network	Team Kai; Team Aina	Kai 16; Aina 13	
Jan. 21	4:00 p.m.	Tropical Bowl	Camping World Stadium; Orlando, Florida	Varsity Sports Network	American Team; National Team	American 48; National 10	
Jan. 28	6:00 p.m.	NFLPA Collegiate Bowl	Rose Bowl; Pasadena, California	NFL Network	American Team; National Team	American 19; National 17	
Feb. 2	8:30 p.m.	East–West Shrine Bowl	Allegiant Stadium; Paradise, Nevada	NFL Network	West Team; East Team	West 12; East 3	
Feb. 4	2:30 p.m.	Senior Bowl	Hancock Whitney Stadium; Mobile, Alabama	NFL Network	National Team; American Team	National 27; American 10	
Feb. 25	4:00 p.m.	HBCU Legacy Bowl	Yulman Stadium; New Orleans, Louisiana	NFL Network	Team Robinson; Team Gaither	Robinson 10; Gaither 3	

The HBCU Legacy Bowl features players from historically black colleges and universities (HBCU). Most HBCU football programs compete in the Mid-Eastern Athletic Conference (MEAC) or the Southwestern Athletic Conference (SWAC), which are part of FCS.

== Team selections ==
=== CFP top 25 standings and bowl games ===
The College Football Playoff (CFP) selection committee announced its final team rankings for the season on December 4, 2022. It was the ninth season of the CFP era. It was the first time that two Big Ten teams were in the semifinals, and the first time that neither Alabama nor Clemson were in the semifinals.

Rank	Team	W–L	Conference and standing	Bowl game
1	Georgia Bulldogs	13–0	SEC champions	Peach Bowl (CFP semifinal)
2	Michigan Wolverines	13–0	Big Ten champions	Fiesta Bowl (CFP semifinal)
3	TCU Horned Frogs	12–1	Big 12 first place	Fiesta Bowl (CFP semifinal)
4	Ohio State Buckeyes	11–1	Big Ten East Division second place	Peach Bowl (CFP semifinal)
5	Alabama Crimson Tide	10–2	SEC West Division co-champions	Sugar Bowl (NY6)
6	Tennessee Volunteers	10–2	SEC East Division second place	Orange Bowl (NY6)
7	Clemson Tigers	11–2	ACC champions	Orange Bowl (NY6)
8	Utah Utes	10–3	Pac-12 champions	Rose Bowl (NY6)
9	Kansas State Wildcats	10–3	Big 12 champions	Sugar Bowl (NY6)
10	USC Trojans	11–2	Pac-12 first place	Cotton Bowl (NY6)
11	Penn State Nittany Lions	10–2	Big Ten East Division third place	Rose Bowl (NY6)
12	Washington Huskies	10–2	Pac-12 second place (tie)	Alamo Bowl
13	Florida State Seminoles	9–3	ACC Atlantic Division second place	Cheez-It Bowl
14	Oregon State Beavers	9–3	Pac-12 fifth place (tie)	Las Vegas Bowl
15	Oregon Ducks	9–3	Pac-12 second place (tie)	Holiday Bowl
16	Tulane Green Wave	11–2	AAC champions	Cotton Bowl (NY6)
17	LSU Tigers	9–4	SEC West Division co-champions	Citrus Bowl
18	UCLA Bruins	9–3	Pac-12 fifth place (tie)	Sun Bowl
19	South Carolina Gamecocks	8–4	SEC East Division third place	Gator Bowl
20	Texas Longhorns	8–4	Big 12 third place	Alamo Bowl
21	Notre Dame Fighting Irish	8–4	Independent	Gator Bowl
22	Mississippi State Bulldogs	8–4	SEC West Division third place (tie)	ReliaQuest Bowl
23	NC State Wolfpack	8–4	ACC Atlantic Division third place (tie)	Duke's Mayo Bowl
24	Troy Trojans	11–2	Sun Belt champions	Cure Bowl
25	UTSA Roadrunners	11–2	C–USA champions	Cure Bowl

=== Conference champions' bowl games ===
Ranks are per the final CFP rankings, released on December 4, with win–loss records at that time. One bowl will feature a matchup of conference champions – the Cure Bowl. Champions of the Power Five conferences were assured of a spot in a New Year's Six bowl game.

Conference	Champion	W–L	Rank	Bowl game
ACC	Clemson Tigers	11–2	7	Orange Bowl (NY6)
American	Tulane Green Wave	11–2	16	Cotton Bowl (NY6)
Big 12	Kansas State Wildcats	10–3	9	Sugar Bowl (NY6)
Big Ten	Michigan Wolverines	13–0	2	Fiesta Bowl (semifinal)
C–USA	UTSA Roadrunners	11–2	25	Cure Bowl
MAC	Toledo Rockets	8–5	–	Boca Raton Bowl
Mountain West	Fresno State Bulldogs	9–4	–	LA Bowl
Pac-12	Utah Utes	10–3	8	Rose Bowl (NY6)
SEC	Georgia Bulldogs	13–0	1	Peach Bowl (semifinal)
Sun Belt	Troy Trojans	11–2	24	Cure Bowl

=== Bowl-eligible teams ===
Generally, a team must have at least six wins to be considered bowl eligible, with at least five of those wins being against FBS opponents. The College Football Playoff semifinal games are determined based on the top four seeds in the playoff committee's final rankings. The remainder of the bowl eligible teams are selected by each respective bowl based on conference tie-ins, order of selection, match-up considerations, and other factors.

- ACC (9): Clemson, Duke, Florida State, Louisville, NC State, North Carolina, Pittsburgh, Syracuse, Wake Forest
- American (7): Cincinnati, East Carolina, Houston, Memphis, SMU, Tulane, UCF
- Big Ten (9): Illinois, Iowa, Maryland, Michigan, Minnesota, Ohio State, Penn State, Purdue, Wisconsin
- Big 12 (8): Baylor, Kansas, Kansas State, Oklahoma, Oklahoma State, TCU, Texas, Texas Tech
- C–USA (6): Middle Tennessee, North Texas, Rice, (Note: Despite having a 5–7 record, Rice was bowl-eligible due to having the highest Academic Progress Rate among five-win teams.) UAB, UTSA, Western Kentucky
- MAC (6): Bowling Green, Buffalo, Eastern Michigan, Miami (OH), Ohio, Toledo
- Mountain West (7): Air Force, Boise State, Fresno State, San Diego State, San Jose State, Utah State, Wyoming
- Pac-12 (7): Oregon, Oregon State, UCLA, USC, Utah, Washington, Washington State
- SEC (11): Alabama, Arkansas, Florida, Georgia, Kentucky, LSU, Mississippi State, Missouri, Ole Miss, South Carolina, Tennessee
- Sun Belt (7): Coastal Carolina, Georgia Southern, Louisiana, Marshall, South Alabama, Southern Miss, Troy
- Independent (5): BYU, Liberty, New Mexico State, (Note: Despite having a 6–6 record with 2 wins over FCS teams, the NCAA granted a waiver for New Mexico State to be bowl-eligible due to their canceled game against San Jose State.) Notre Dame, UConn

Number of bowl berths available: 82
Number of bowl-eligible teams: 80
Number of conditional bowl-eligible teams: 1 (New Mexico State)
Number of teams qualified by APR: 1 (Rice)

=== Bowl-ineligible teams ===
- ACC (5): Boston College, Georgia Tech, Miami (FL), Virginia, Virginia Tech
- American (4): Navy, South Florida, Temple, Tulsa
- Big Ten (5): Indiana, Michigan State, Nebraska, Northwestern, Rutgers
- Big 12 (2): Iowa State, West Virginia
- C–USA (5): Charlotte, FIU, Florida Atlantic, Louisiana Tech, UTEP
- MAC (6): Akron, Ball State, Central Michigan, Kent State, Northern Illinois, Western Michigan
- Mountain West (5): Colorado State, Hawaii, Nevada, New Mexico, UNLV
- Pac-12 (5): Arizona, Arizona State, California, Colorado, Stanford
- SEC (3): Auburn, Texas A&M, Vanderbilt
- Sun Belt (7): Appalachian State, (Note: Despite having a 6–6 record, Appalachian State was bowl-ineligible as two of their wins were over FCS teams.) Arkansas State, Georgia State, James Madison, (Note: James Madison was bowl-ineligible due to their transition from FCS to FBS.) Louisiana–Monroe, Old Dominion, Texas State
- Independent (2): Army, (Note: Despite having a 6–6 record, Army was bowl-ineligible as two of their wins were over FCS teams.) UMass

Number of bowl-ineligible teams: 49

== Venues ==
A total of thirty-seven venues will be utilized, with seven of them in particular for the CFP National Championship and New Year's Six (NY6). Prestige and capacity of venues usually increases as the schedule progresses towards to NY6 bowls and the national championship, in large part due to scheduling Top 25 teams late into the bowl games' time frame, while bowl games before Christmas Day typically involve schools in Group of Five conferences and FBS Independents (with the exception of Notre Dame due to being a member of the ACC in all other sports except for men's hockey which competes in the Big Ten). Televising at the venues of bowl games is largely run by ESPN and joint networks (ABC & ESPN2), with only three bowl games run by a non-affiliated network (Holiday Bowl on Fox, Sun Bowl on CBS and Arizona Bowl on Barstool Sports). With the exception of the Bahamas Bowl in The Bahamas, all bowls will be played within the United States.

A map of all hosts of bowl games and their locations in the United States and The Bahamas.
Venues with a number and an x host multiple bowl games.

=== CFP bowls ===
The College Football Playoff committee elected to continue with the six venues for this postseason—including two as the semifinals for the 2023 College Football Playoff National Championship—as outlined below:

- State Farm Stadium in Glendale: Venue for the 2022 Fiesta Bowl that featured one of the semi-final pairings.
- Mercedes-Benz Stadium in Atlanta: Venue for the 2022 Peach Bowl that featured one of the semi-final pairings.
- AT&T Stadium in Arlington: Venue for the 2023 Cotton Bowl Classic (January) that featured two of the four highest non-Top 4 and non-NY6 bid conference affiliated.
- Hard Rock Stadium in Miami Gardens: Venue for the 2022 Orange Bowl that featured two of the four highest non-Top 4 and non-NY6 bid conference affiliated.
- Rose Bowl in Pasadena: Venue for the 2023 Rose Bowl that featured the highest non-top 4 conference finishers from the Big Ten and Pac-12.
- Caesars Superdome in New Orleans: Venue for the 2022 Sugar Bowl that featured the highest non-top 4 conference finishers from the SEC and Big 12.
- SoFi Stadium in Inglewood (Los Angeles): Venue for the 2023 College Football Playoff National Championship that featured the winners of both semi-finals.

Glendale (Phoenix area)	Atlanta	New Orleans
State Farm Stadium	Mercedes-Benz Stadium	Caesars Superdome
Capacity: 78,600	Capacity: 75,000	Capacity: 76,468
Exterior of the stadium, 2006	Near completion in August 2017	The Superdome on July 26, 2021, between removal of Mercedes-Benz branding and installation of Caesars branding.
Pasadena (Los Angeles area)	Venues of the 2022 New Year's Six Bowls Source: College Football Playoff	
Rose Bowl	Venues of the 2022 New Year's Six Bowls Source: College Football Playoff	
Capacity: 92,542	Venues of the 2022 New Year's Six Bowls Source: College Football Playoff	
Aerial view from south in 2018	Venues of the 2022 New Year's Six Bowls Source: College Football Playoff	
Arlington (Dallas/Fort Worth area)	Inglewood (Los Angeles area)^{NC}	Miami Gardens (Miami area)
AT&T Stadium	SoFi Stadium	Hard Rock Stadium
Capacity: 105,000	Capacity: 100,240	Capacity: 64,767
Exterior, June 2020	Aerial photograph of SoFi Stadium (2021).	Exterior view, January 2020

=== Venues hosting multiple bowls ===
The following venues were selected to host more than one bowl game or all-star game:

- Allegiant Stadium (Las Vegas area): Las Vegas Bowl, East–West Shrine Bowl†
- Caesars Superdome (New Orleans): New Orleans Bowl, Sugar Bowl
- Camping World Stadium (Orlando): Cheez-It Bowl, Citrus Bowl, Tropical Bowl†
- Hancock Whitney Stadium (Mobile): LendingTree Bowl, Senior Bowl†
- Mercedes-Benz Stadium (Atlanta): Peach Bowl, Celebration Bowl‡
- Raymond James Stadium (Tampa): Gasparilla Bowl, ReliaQuest Bowl
- Rose Bowl (Pasadena, California): Rose Bowl, NFLPA Collegiate Bowl†
- SoFi Stadium (Los Angeles area): LA Bowl, National Championship

† denotes an all-star game
‡ denotes an FCS bowl game
