= Taye Barber =

American football player (born 1999)

Profile
- Position: Wide receiver

Personal information
- Born: October 24, 1999 (age 27); Cypress, Texas, U.S.
- Listed height: 5 ft 10 in (1.78 m)
- Listed weight: 182 lb (83 kg)

Career information
- High school: Cypress Springs (Cypress, Texas)
- College: TCU (2018–2022)
- NFL draft: 2023: undrafted

Career history
- Tampa Bay Buccaneers (2023)*
- * Offseason or practice squad member only
- Stats at Pro Football Reference

Taye Barber (born October 24, 1999) is an American football wide receiver. He played college football at TCU and was signed by the Buccaneers as an undrafted free agent in 2023.

== Early life and education ==
Barber was born on October 24, 1999, in Cypress, Texas. He attended Cypress Springs High School there, played both quarterback and running back. Barber threw for 3,832 yards and 38 touchdowns while adding 832 yards rushing and 10 scores on the ground his sophomore year, which earned him earned second-team all-district honors. Barber transitioned to a running back as a senior, rushing for 805 yards and seven touchdowns in addition to totaling 10 receptions for 294 yards and a score. Barber was a three-star recruit by 247Sports.com, ranked as the No. 8 athlete in Texas and No. 42 in the nation, rated as the No. 76 overall player in Texas.

Barber had multiple offers from Clemson, Oklahoma State, Stanford and Wisconsin, but ultimately chose TCU over them.

== College career ==
Barber made an immediate impact as a true freshman with 300 receiving yards and a pair of touchdown catches on the season. Barber played in every game of the season for the Horned Frogs and had multiple catches on all but two occasions.

Playing as a senior in 2022, Barber recorded at least one reception in 14 out of 15 games that year.

== Professional career ==
Pre-draft measurables
Height	Weight	Arm length	Hand span	40-yard dash	10-yard split	20-yard split	20-yard shuttle	Three-cone drill	Vertical jump	Broad jump	Bench press
5 ft 9 5/8 in (1.77 m)	180 lb (82 kg)	31 1/4 in (0.79 m)	9 1/8 in (0.23 m)	4.45 s	1.54 s	2.60 s	4.40 s	7.13 s	32.5 in (0.83 m)	9 ft 7 in (2.92 m)	12 reps
All values from Pro Day

Barber was signed by the Tampa Bay Buccaneers as an undrafted free agent on May 12, 2023. He was waived on August 28.
