= 2022 Georgia Bulldogs football team =

American college football season

2022 Georgia Bulldogs football

Consensus national champion SEC champion SEC Eastern Division champion Peach Bowl champion

SEC Championship Game, W 50–30 vs. LSU

Peach Bowl (CFP Semifinal), W 42–41 vs. Ohio State CFP National Championship, W 65–7 vs. TCU
- Conference: Southeastern Conference
- Eastern Division

Ranking
- Coaches: No. 1
- AP: No. 1
- Record: 15–0 (8–0 SEC)
- Head coach: Kirby Smart (7th season)
- Offensive coordinator: Todd Monken (3rd season)
- Offensive scheme: Pro spread
- Co-defensive coordinators: Glenn Schumann (4th season); Will Muschamp (1st season)
- Base defense: 3–4
- Home stadium: Sanford Stadium

Uniform
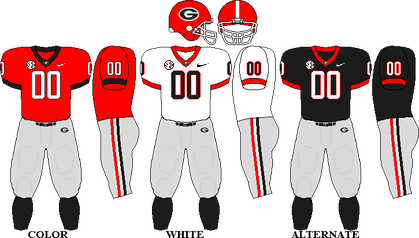

2022 Southeastern Conference football standings
	Conf.			Overall
Team	W		L	W		L
Eastern Division
No. 1 Georgia xy$#^	8	–	0	15	–	0
No. 6 Tennessee	6	–	2	11	–	2
No. 23 South Carolina	4	–	4	8	–	5
Kentucky	3	–	5	7	–	6
Florida	3	–	5	6	–	7
Missouri	3	–	5	6	–	7
Vanderbilt	2	–	6	5	–	7
Western Division
No. 16 LSU xy	6	–	2	10	–	4
No. 5 Alabama x	6	–	2	11	–	2
No. 20 Mississippi State	4	–	4	9	–	4
Ole Miss	4	–	4	8	–	5
Arkansas	3	–	5	7	–	6
Auburn	2	–	6	5	–	7
Texas A&M	2	–	6	5	–	7
Championship: Georgia 50, LSU 30
# – College Football Playoff champion; ^ – College Football Playoff participant; $ – Conference champion; x – Division champion/co-champions; y – Championship game participant; Rankings from AP Poll

The 2022 Georgia Bulldogs football team represented the University of Georgia in the 2022 NCAA Division I FBS football season. The Bulldogs played their home games at Sanford Stadium in Athens, Georgia, and competed in the Eastern Division of the Southeastern Conference (SEC). They were led by seventh-year head coach Kirby Smart. They entered the season as the defending consensus national champions.

This season is one of two back-to-back Georgia seasons that won a national championship. In the 2021 season, Georgia won 33–18 against Alabama, and in the 2022 season, Georgia won 65–7 against TCU.

The Bulldogs finished the regular season 12–0, 8–0 in SEC play to finish first in the conference's Eastern Division. In the SEC Championship Game, the Bulldogs defeated the LSU Tigers 50–30 to win their first SEC title since 2017. They advanced to the College Football Playoff for the second straight year and were selected to play against Ohio State in the Peach Bowl. Georgia mounted the largest 4th-quarter comeback in CFP history to defeat Ohio State by a score of 42–41, after Ohio State missed a potential game-winning 50-yard field goal in the final seconds of the game. As the season's last major team with an undefeated record, the Bulldogs faced off against Texas Christian University (TCU) at SoFi Stadium in Inglewood, California for the 2023 CFP National Championship on January 9, 2023. They dominated TCU 65–7 to become the first team since the 2012 Alabama Crimson Tide to repeat as national champions, along with becoming just the 3rd team to complete a 15–0 season in the modern era, after LSU in 2019 and Clemson in 2018. They would be subsequently joined by Michigan the following year. Their 58-point margin of victory over TCU was the largest of any bowl game result, until next season when Georgia defeated Florida State with a 60-point margin, 63–3, in the 2023 Orange Bowl.

== Offseason ==
=== NFL draft ===
Fifteen Bulldogs were selected in the 2022 NFL Draft, setting a new record for draft picks from a single school in the seven-round draft era (1994–present).

Player	Position	Team	Round	Pick
Travon Walker	DE	Jacksonville Jaguars	1	1
Jordan Davis	DT	Philadelphia Eagles	1	13
Quay Walker	LB	Green Bay Packers	1	22
Devonte Wyatt	DE	Green Bay Packers	1	28
Lewis Cine	S	Minnesota Vikings	1	32
George Pickens	WR	Pittsburgh Steelers	2	52
James Cook	RB	Buffalo Bills	2	63
Nakobe Dean	LB	Philadelphia Eagles	3	83
Channing Tindall	LB	Miami Dolphins	3	102
Zamir White	RB	Las Vegas Raiders	4	122
Jake Camarda	P	Tampa Bay Buccaneers	4	133
Justin Shaffer	G	Atlanta Falcons	6	190
Jamaree Salyer	G	Los Angeles Chargers	6	195
Derion Kendrick	CB	Los Angeles Rams	6	212
John FitzPatrick	TE	Atlanta Falcons	6	213

=== Players ===
2022 Georgia offseason departures
Name	Number	Pos.	Height	Weight	Year	Hometown	Notes
George Pickens	#1	WR	6'3"	200	Junior	Hoover, AL	Declared for the 2022 NFL Draft
Zamir White	#3	RB	6'0"	215	Junior	Laurinburg, NC	Declared for the 2022 NFL Draft
James Cook	#4	RB	5'11"	190	Senior	Miami, FL	Declared for the 2022 NFL Draft
Quay Walker	#7	LB	6'4"	240	Senior	Cordele, GA	Graduated/Declared for the 2022 NFL Draft
Derion Kendrick	#11	DB	6'0"	190	Senior	Rock Hill, SC	Graduated/Declared for the 2022 NFL Draft
Lewis Cine	#16	DB	6'1"	200	Junior	Cedar Hill, TX	Declared for the 2022 NFL Draft
Nakobe Dean	#17	LB	6'0"	225	Junior	Horn Lake, MS	Declared for the 2022 NFL Draft
Adam Anderson	#19	LB	6'5"	230	Senior	Rome, GA	Graduated
John Staton IV	#35	LB	6'1"	225	Grad Student	Atlanta, GA	Graduated
Brady Tindall	#39	WR	5'10"	192	Senior	Atlanta, GA	Graduated
Channing Tindall	#41	LB	6'2"	230	Senior	Columbia, SC	Graduated/Declared for the 2022 NFL Draft
Chase Harof	#43	TE	6'2"	250	Senior	Roswell, GA	Graduated
Travon Walker	#44	DL	6'5"	275	Junior	Thomaston, GA	Declared for the 2022 NFL Draft
Justin Shaffer	#54	OL	6'4"	330	Senior	Ellenwood, GA	Graduated/Declared for the 2022 NFL Draft
Jamaree Salyer	#69	OL	6'4"	325	Senior	Atlanta, GA	Graduated/Declared for the 2022 NFL Draft
John FitzPatrick	#86	TE	6'7"	250	Junior	Atlanta, GA	Declared for the 2022 NFL Draft
Jake Camarda	#90	P/PK	6'2"	180	Senior	Norcross, GA	Declared for the 2022 NFL Draft
Julian Rochester	#92	DL	6'5"	300	Senior	Mableton, GA	Graduated
Devonte Wyatt	#95	DL	6'3"	315	Senior	Decatur, GA	Graduated/Declared for the 2022 NFL Draft
Jordan Davis	#99	DL	6'6"	340	Senior	Charlotte, NC	Graduated/Declared for the 2022 NFL Draft

==== Outgoing transfers ====
Eight players elected to enter the NCAA Transfer Portal during or after the 2021 season.

Name	No.	Pos.	Height	Weight	Year	Hometown	New school
Jalen Kimber	#6	DB	6'0"	170	(redshirt) Freshman	Mansfield, TX	Transferred to Florida
Jermaine Burton	#7	WR	6'0"	200	Sophomore	Calabasas, CA	Transferred to Alabama
Ameer Speed	#9	DB	6'3"	211	Senior	Jacksonville, FL	Transferred to Michigan State
Justin Robinson	#9	WR	6'4"	220	(redshirt) Freshman	McDonough, GA	Transferred to Mississippi State
Lovasea Carroll	#12	DB	6'1"	195	Freshman	Warrenton, GA	Transferred to South Carolina
JT Daniels	#18	QB	6'3"	210	(redshirt) Junior	Irvine, CA	Transferred to West Virginia
Jaylen Johnson	#23	WR	6'2"	192	Junior	Duluth, GA	Transferred to East Carolina
Daran Branch	#26	DB	6'2"	178	Freshman	Amite, LA	Transferred to LSU
Latavious Brini	#36	DB	6'2"	210	Senior	Miami Gardens, FL	Transferred to Arkansas
Clay Webb	#60	OL	6'3"	290	Sophomore	Oxford, AL	Transferred to Jacksonville State
Owen Condon	#75	OL	6'7"	310	Junior	Oklahoma City, OK	Transferred to SMU
Tymon Mitchell	#91	DL	6'3"	300	Junior	Nashville, TN	Transferred to TCU

† Elected to use the extra year of eligibility granted by the NCAA in response to COVID-19.

=== Additions ===
==== Incoming transfers ====
Name	No.	Pos.	Height	Weight	Year	Hometown	Prev. school

==== Recruiting class ====
College recruiting
Name	Hometown	School	Height	Weight	Commit date
Malaki Starks; ATH	Jefferson, GA	Jefferson High School	6 ft 1 in (1.85 m)	195 lb (88 kg)	Mar 24, 2021
Malaki Starks; ATH	Recruit ratings: Rivals: 247Sports: ESPN: (90)				
Jaheim Singletary; CB	Jacksonville, FL	Riverside High School	6 ft 1 in (1.85 m)	175 lb (79 kg)	Nov 21, 2021
Jaheim Singletary; CB	Recruit ratings: Rivals: 247Sports: ESPN: (89)				
Mykel Williams; DT	Columbus, GA	Hardaway High School	6 ft 5 in (1.96 m)	245 lb (111 kg)	Oct 20, 2021
Mykel Williams; DT	Recruit ratings: Rivals: 247Sports: ESPN: (88)				
Branson Robinson; RB	Madison, MS	Germantown High School	5 ft 10 in (1.78 m)	220 lb (100 kg)	Jul 22, 2021
Branson Robinson; RB	Recruit ratings: Rivals: 247Sports: ESPN: (87)				
Jalon Walker; LB	Salisbury, NC	Salisbury High School	6 ft 2 in (1.88 m)	220 lb (100 kg)	Mar 28, 2021
Jalon Walker; LB	Recruit ratings: Rivals: 247Sports: ESPN: (87)				
Daylen Everette; CB	Bradenton, FL	IMG Academy	6 ft 0 in (1.83 m)	175 lb (79 kg)	Dec 14, 2021
Daylen Everette; CB	Recruit ratings: Rivals: 247Sports: ESPN: (86)				
Bear Alexander; DT	Bradenton, FL	IMG Academy	6 ft 4 in (1.93 m)	335 lb (152 kg)	Oct 21, 2021
Bear Alexander; DT	Recruit ratings: Rivals: 247Sports: ESPN: (86)				
Marvin Jones Jr. LB	Plantation, FL	American Heritage High School	6 ft 4 in (1.93 m)	220 lb (100 kg)	Dec 15, 2021
Marvin Jones Jr. LB	Recruit ratings: Rivals: 247Sports: ESPN: (85)				
Earnest Greene III; OT	Bellflower, CA	St. John Bosco High School	6 ft 4 in (1.93 m)	300 lb (140 kg)	Jan 8, 2022
Earnest Greene III; OT	Recruit ratings: Rivals: 247Sports: ESPN: (85)				
C.J. Washington; LB	Cedartown, GA	Cedartown High School	6 ft 1 in (1.85 m)	215 lb (98 kg)	Jul 22, 2020
C.J. Washington; LB	Recruit ratings: Rivals: 247Sports: ESPN: (85)				
Gunner Stockton; QB	Tiger, GA	Rabun County High School	6 ft 1 in (1.85 m)	210 lb (95 kg)	Jan 28, 2021
Gunner Stockton; QB	Recruit ratings: Rivals: 247Sports: ESPN: (83)				
Chandler Smith; WR	Mount Dora, FL	Mount Dora High School	6 ft 3 in (1.91 m)	180 lb (82 kg)	Dec 14, 2021
Chandler Smith; WR	Recruit ratings: Rivals: 247Sports: ESPN: (83)				
Christen Miller; DT	Ellenwood, GA	Cedar Grove High School	6 ft 4 in (1.93 m)	280 lb (130 kg)	Feb 2, 2022
Christen Miller; DT	Recruit ratings: Rivals: 247Sports: ESPN: (83)				
Oscar Delp; TE	Cumming, GA	West Forsyth High School	6 ft 5 in (1.96 m)	220 lb (100 kg)	Oct 13, 2021
Oscar Delp; TE	Recruit ratings: Rivals: 247Sports: ESPN: (83)				
Julian Humphrey; CB	Houston, TX	Clear Lake High School	6 ft 1 in (1.85 m)	185 lb (84 kg)	Nov 12, 2021
Julian Humphrey; CB	Recruit ratings: Rivals: 247Sports: ESPN: (82)				
Darris Smith; DE	Baxley, GA	Appling County High School	6 ft 6 in (1.98 m)	225 lb (102 kg)	Dec 2, 2020
Darris Smith; DE	Recruit ratings: Rivals: 247Sports: ESPN: (82)				
Andrew Paul; RB	Dallas, TX	Parish Episcopal School	5 ft 11 in (1.80 m)	220 lb (100 kg)	Feb 2, 2022
Andrew Paul; RB	Recruit ratings: Rivals: 247Sports: ESPN: (80)				
De'Nylon Morrissette; WR	Kennesaw, GA	North Cobb High School	6 ft 1 in (1.85 m)	200 lb (91 kg)	Apr 30, 2021
De'Nylon Morrissette; WR	Recruit ratings: Rivals: 247Sports: ESPN: (80)				
Shone Washington; DT	New Orleans, LA	Warren Easton High School	6 ft 3 in (1.91 m)	305 lb (138 kg)	Nov 29, 2021
Shone Washington; DT	Recruit ratings: Rivals: 247Sports: ESPN: (80)				
Ja'Corey Thomas; ATH	Orlando, FL	Boone High School	6 ft 1 in (1.85 m)	190 lb (86 kg)	Jun 25, 2021
Ja'Corey Thomas; ATH	Recruit ratings: Rivals: 247Sports: ESPN: (80)				
Cole Speer; WR	Calhoun, GA	Calhoun High School	6 ft 0 in (1.83 m)	185 lb (84 kg)	Aug 12, 2021
Cole Speer; WR	Recruit ratings: Rivals: 247Sports: ESPN: (79)				
Dillon Bell; ATH	Houston, TX	Kinkaid School	6 ft 2 in (1.88 m)	200 lb (91 kg)	Aug 2, 2021
Dillon Bell; ATH	Recruit ratings: Rivals: 247Sports: ESPN: (79)				
Aliou Bah; OT	Bradenton, FL	IMG Academy	6 ft 6 in (1.98 m)	315 lb (143 kg)	Oct 18, 2021
Aliou Bah; OT	Recruit ratings: Rivals: 247Sports: ESPN: (79)				
Jacob Hood; OT	Nashville, TN	Hillsboro High School	6 ft 7 in (2.01 m)	350 lb (160 kg)	Aug 30, 2021
Jacob Hood; OT	Recruit ratings: Rivals: 247Sports: ESPN: (78)				
E.J. Lightsey; LB	Fitzgerald, GA	Fitzgerald High School	6 ft 2 in (1.88 m)	210 lb (95 kg)	Feb 2, 2022
E.J. Lightsey; LB	Recruit ratings: Rivals: 247Sports: ESPN: (78)				
Drew Bobo; OT	Auburn, AL	Auburn High School	6 ft 5 in (1.96 m)	300 lb (140 kg)	Dec 13, 2021
Drew Bobo; OT	Recruit ratings: Rivals: 247Sports: ESPN: (78)				
Carlton Madden; DE	Ellenwood, GA	Cedar Grove High School	6 ft 4 in (1.93 m)	235 lb (107 kg)	Sep 16, 2021
Carlton Madden; DE	Recruit ratings: Rivals: 247Sports: ESPN: (77)				
Griffin Scroggs; OL	Loganville, GA	Grayson High School	6 ft 4 in (1.93 m)	295 lb (134 kg)	Aug 3, 2021
Griffin Scroggs; OL	Recruit ratings: Rivals: 247Sports: ESPN: (77)				
Brett Thorson; K	Melbourne, AUS	ProKick Australia	6 ft 2 in (1.88 m)	205 lb (93 kg)	Apr 1, 2021
Brett Thorson; K	Recruit ratings: Rivals: 247Sports: ESPN: (75)				
Overall recruit ranking: Rivals: #2 247Sports: #3 ESPN: #2
Note: In many cases, Scout, Rivals, 247Sports, On3, and ESPN may conflict in their listings of height and weight.; In these cases, the average was taken. ESPN grades are on a 100-point scale.; Sources: "Rivals commits". Rivals.; "ESPN commits". ESPN.; "2022 Team Ranking". Rivals.com.; "247Sports commits". 247Sports.

*= 247Sports Composite rating; ratings are out of 1.00. (five stars= 1.00–.98, four stars= .97–.90, three stars= .80–.89, two stars= .79–.70, no stars= <70)
†= Despite being rated as a four and five star recruit by ESPN, On3.com, Rivals.com and 247Sports.com, TBD received a four-five star 247Sports Composite rating.
Δ= Left the Georgia program following signing but prior to the 2022 season.

=== Overall class rankings ===
Website	National rank	Conference rank	5 star recruits	4 star recruits	3 star recruits	2 star recruits	1 star recruits	No star ranking
ESPN	#2	#2	1	18	7	0	0	0
On3 Recruits	#3	#3	5	16	6	0	0	0
Rivals	#2	#2	5	15	6	0	0	0
247 Sports	#3	#3	5	15	7	0	0	0

=== Returning starters ===
Offense

Player	Class	Position
Stetson Bennett	Graduate	Quarterback
Kendall Milton	Junior	Running Back
Adonai Mitchell	Sophomore	Wide receiver
Kearis Jackson	Senior	Wide receiver
Ladd McConkey	RS Sophomore	Wide receiver
Warren Ericson	Senior	Offensive Line
Sedrick Van Pran-Granger	RS Sophomore	Offensive Line
Broderick Jones	RS Sophomore	Offensive Line
Brock Bowers	Sophomore	Tight end

Defense

Player	Class	Position
Jalen Carter	Junior	Defensive Line
Nolan Smith	Senior	Linebacker
Kelee Ringo	RS Sophomore	Cornerback
Christopher Smith II	Senior	Defensive Back
William Poole	Graduate	Defensive Back

Special teams

Player	Class	Position
Jack Podlesny	Senior	Kicker
Payne Walker	Senior	Long snapper

† Indicates player was a starter in 2021 but missed all of 2022 due to injury.

== Roster ==
2022 Georgia Bulldogs football team roster
Players
Coaches
Offense

Pos.	#	Name	Class
TE	0	Darnell Washington	Jr
WR	1	Marcus Rosemy-Jacksaint	Jr
RB	2	Kendall Milton	Jr
RB	3	Andrew Paul	Fr
TE	4	Oscar Delp	Fr
WR	5	Adonai Mitchell	So
RB	6	Kenny McIntosh	Sr
WR	8	Dominick Blaylock	Jr
WR	9	Jackson Meeks	So
WR	10	Kearis Jackson	Sr
WR	11	Arian Smith	So
QB	12	Brock Vandagriff	Fr
QB	13	Stetson Bennett	Sr
WR	14	Arik Gilbert	Jr
QB	14	Gunner Stockton	Fr
QB	15	Carson Beck	So
QB	16	Jackson Muschamp	So
WR	18	C. J. Smith	Fr
TE	19	Brock Bowers	So
RB	20	Sevaughn Clark	Jr
RB	22	Branson Robinson	Fr
WR	23	De'Nylon Morrissette	Fr
QB	24	Nathan Priestley	Jr
QB	26	Collin Drake	Fr
WR	28	Luke Bennett	Fr
RB	30	Daijun Edwards	Jr
WR	31	Grant Briscoe	Fr
RB	32	Cash Jones	Fr
WR	36	Randon Jernigan	Sr
WR	38	Brooks Bortle	Fr
WR	39	Parker Jones	Fr
WR	39	Miles Thornton	Fr
TE	43	Davis Day	Sr
TE	44	Cade Brock	So
RB	45	Jacob Hardie	Fr
WR	46	George Vining	Sr
TE	48	Cooper Johnson	Fr
TE	49	Samuel Johnson	So
OL	50	Warren Ericson	Sr
OL	53	Dylan Fairchild	Fr
OL	55	Jared Wilson	Fr
OL	56	Micah Morris	Fr
OL	58	Austin Blaske	So
OL	59	Broderick Jones	So
OL	63	Sedrick Van Pran-Granger	So
OL	64	Jacob Hood	Fr
OL	65	Amarius Mims	So
OL	66	Aliou Bah	Fr
OL	68	Chris Brown	So
OL	69	Tate Ratledge	So
OL	70	Warren McClendon	Jr
OL	71	Earnest Greene III	Fr
OL	72	Griffin Scroggs	Fr
OL	73	Xavier Truss	Jr
OL	74	Drew Bobo	Fr
OL	76	Miles Johnson	So
OL	77	Devin Willock	So
OL	78	Chad Lindberg	So
OL	79	Weston Wallace	So
TE	80	Brett Seither	Jr
WR	82	Logan Johnson	Fr
WR	83	Cole Speer	Fr
WR	84	Ladd McConkey	So
TE	85	Drew Sheehan	Jr
WR	86	Dillon Bell	Fr
WR	87	Mekhi Mews	Fr
TE	88	Ryland Goede	Jr
WR	89	Braxton Hicks	So

Defense

Pos.	#	Name	Class
ILB	0	Rian Davis	Jr
DB	1	Nylan Green	Fr
ILB	2	Smael Mondon Jr.	So
DB	3	Kamari Lassiter	So
OLB	4	Nolan Smith	Sr
DB	5	Kelee Ringo	So
DB	6	Daylen Everette	Fr
OLB	7	Marvin Jones Jr.	Fr
OLB	8	MJ Sherman	Jr
DB	9	Jaheim Singletary	Fr
ILB	10	Jamon Dumas-Johnson	So
ILB	11	Jalon Walker	Fr
DB	12	Julian Humphrey	Fr
DL	13	Mykel Williams	Fr
DB	14	David Daniel-Sisavanh	So
ILB	15	Trezmen Marshall	Jr
DE	16	C. J. Madden	Fr
DB	17	Dan Jackson	Jr
LB	18	Xavian Sorey Jr.	Fr
OLB	19	Darris Smith	Fr
DB	20	JaCorey Thomas	Fr
DB	22	Javon Bullard	So
DB	23	Tykee Smith	Jr
DB	24	Malaki Starks	Fr
ILB	25	E. J. Lightsey	Fr
LB	27	C. J. Washington	Fr
DB	28	Marcus Washington Jr.	Fr
DB	29	Christopher Smith II	Sr
ILB	30	Terrell Foster	Fr
OLB	32	Chaz Chambliss	So
OLB	33	Robert Beal Jr.	Sr
S	35	Jacob Fleming	Fr
DB	36	Colby Smith	So
DB	37	Drew Southern	Fr
DB	38	Patrick Taylor	So
DE	41	Denton Shamburger	Fr
ILB	42	Graham Collins	So
DL	45	Bill Norton	Jr
DB	46	Payton Bowles	So
DB	48	Joseph Daniels	GS
DB	49	Jamier Moten	Fr
DL	52	Christen Miller	Fr
LB	57	Luke Collins	Fr
DL	78	Nazir Stackhouse	Jr
DL	88	Jalen Carter	Jr
DL	90	Tramel Walthour	Sr
DL	93	Tyrion Ingram-Dawkins	Fr
DL	94	Jonathan Jefferson	Fr
DL	95	Shone Washington	Fr
DL	96	Zion Logue	Jr
DL	97	Warren Brinson	Jr
DL	99	Bear Alexander	Fr

Special teams

Pos.	#	Name	Class
LS	47	Payne Walker	Sr
LS	56	William Mote	Jr
LS	66	Jonathan Washburn	Fr
P	92	Brett Thorson	Fr
K	95	Henry Bates	Fr
K	96	Jack Podlesny	Sr
K/P	97	Matthew Sumlin	So
P	98	Noah Jones	Fr
K	99	Jared Zirkel	So

Head coach

- Kirby Smart

Coordinators/assistant coaches

- Todd Monken – Offensive Coordinator/Quarterbacks
- Will Muschamp – Defensive Coordinator
- Glenn Schumann – Defensive Coordinator/Inside Linebackers
- Scott Cochran – Special Teams Coordinator
- Dell McGee – Run Game Coordinator/Running Backs
- Bryan McClendon – Passing Game Coordinator/Wide Receivers
- Tray Scott – Defensive Line/Assistant Head Coach
- Stacy Searels – Offensive Linemen
- Todd Hartley – Tight Ends/Assistant Head Coach
- Fran Brown – Defensive Backs
- Chidera Uzo-Diribe – Outside Linebackers
- Scott Sinclair – Director, Strength and Conditioning
- Jordan Barber – Assistant, Strength and Conditioning
- Lonnie Brown – Assistant, Strength and Conditioning
- Mike Bobo – Quality Control, Offense
- Jacob Russell – Quality Control, Offense
- Jes Sutherland – Quality Control, Offense
- Montgomery Vangorder – Quality Control, Offense
- Kirk Benedict – Quality Control, Special Teams
- Adam Ray – Quality Control, Special Teams
- Neyland Raper – Director, Football Operations
- Hunter Parker – Assistant, Football Operations
- Anna Courson – Assistant, Football Operations
- Michael Cogan – Assistant, Football Operations
- Jonas Jennings – Director, Player Development
- Juwan Taylor – Assistant, Player Development
- Austin Chambers – Assistant, Player Development

Legend

- (C) Team captain
- (S) Suspended
- (I) Ineligible
- Injured
- Redshirt

Roster
Last update: 4/25/23

== Preseason ==
=== Spring game ===
The Bulldogs held spring practices in March and April 2022 with the Georgia football spring game, "G-Day" taking place in Athens, GA on April 16, 2022.

2022 G-Day Spring Game

Quarter	1	2	3	4	Total
UGA Red	7	10	0	6	23
UGA Black	7	10	6	3	26

at Sanford Stadium, Athens, GA

- Date: April 16, 2022
- Game time: 1:00 p.m. EDT
- Game attendance: 68,002
- TV: ESPN2

=== Award watch lists ===
Listed in the order that they were released

Award	Player	Position	Year	Source
Lott Trophy	Jalen Carter	DT	Jr.	
Lott Trophy	Kelee Ringo	CB	RS Jr.	
Dodd Trophy	Kirby Smart	HC	–	
Maxwell Award	Stetson Bennett	QB	GS	
Maxwell Award	Brock Bowers	TE	Jr.	
Davey O'Brien Award	Stetson Bennett	QB	GS	
Biletnikoff Award	Brock Bowers	TE	So.	
John Mackey Award	Arik Gilbert	TE	RS So.	
John Mackey Award	Brock Bowers	TE	So.	
John Mackey Award	Darnell Washington	TE	Jr.	
Rimington Trophy	Sedrick Van Pran-Granger	OL	RS So.	
Butkus Award	Jamon Dumas-Johnson	LB	So.	
Jim Thorpe Award	Christopher Smith II	DB	Sr.	
Jim Thorpe Award	Kelee Ringo	DB	RS So.	
Bronko Nagurski Trophy	Jalen Carter	DT	Jr.	
Bronko Nagurski Trophy	Kelee Ringo	CB	RS So.	
Bronko Nagurski Trophy	Nolan Smith	LB	Sr.	
Outland Trophy	Broderick Jones	OT	RS So.	
Outland Trophy	Jalen Carter	DT	Jr.	
Outland Trophy	Warren Ericson	OL	Sr.	
Lou Groza Award	Jack Podlesny	PK	Sr.	
Wuerffel Trophy	Kearis Jackson	WR/ST	Sr.	
Walter Camp Award	Brock Bowers	TE	So.	
Walter Camp Award	Jalen Carter	DT	Jr.	
Walter Camp Award	Kelee Ringo	CB	RS So.	
Bednarik Award	Jalen Carter	DT	Jr.	
Bednarik Award	Kelee Ringo	CB	RS So.	
Bednarik Award	Nolan Smith	LB	Sr.	
Rotary Lombardi Award	Brock Bowers	TE	So.	
Rotary Lombardi Award	Jalen Carter	DT	Jr.	
Rotary Lombardi Award	Nolan Smith	LB	Sr.	
Manning Award	Stetson Bennett	QB	Sr.	
Johnny Unitas Golden Arm Award	Stetson Bennett	QB	Sr.	
Ted Hendricks Award				

=== SEC media days ===
The 2022 SEC Media days will be held in July 2022. The Preseason Polls will be released in July 2022. Each team had their head coach available to talk to the media at the event. Coverage of the event was televised on SEC Network and ESPN.

Media poll (East Division)
Predicted finish	Team	Votes (1st place)
1	Georgia	1254 (172)
2	Kentucky	932 (4)
3	Tennessee	929 (1)
4	Florida	712
5	South Carolina	662 (3)
6	Missouri	383
7	Vanderbilt	196 (1)

Media poll (SEC Championship)
Rank	Team	Votes
1	Alabama	158
2	Georgia	18
3	South Carolina	3

=== Preseason All-SEC teams ===
==== Media ====
First Team

Position	Player	Class	Team
Offense
TE	Brock Bowers	Sophomore	Georgia
Defense
LB	Nolan Smith	Senior	Georgia
DT	Jalen Carter	Junior	Georgia
CB	Kelee Ringo	RS Sophomore	Georgia
Special teams
WR/ST	Kearis Jackson	Senior	Georgia

Second Team

Position	Player	Class	Team
Offense
OL	Sedrick Van Pran-Granger	RS Sophomore	Georgia
Defense
SS	Christopher Smith II	Senior	Georgia

Third Team

Position	Player	Class	Team
Offense
RB	Kenny McIntosh	Senior	Georgia

==== Coaches ====
First Team

Position	Player	Class	Team
Offense
TE	Brock Bowers	Sophomore	Georgia
OT	Warren McClendon	Junior	Georgia
Defense
DT	Jalen Carter	Junior	Georgia
CB	Kelee Ringo	RS Sophomore	Georgia

Second Team

Position	Player	Class	Team
Offense
QB	Stetson Bennett	Senior	Georgia
OL	Sedrick Van Pran-Granger	RS Sophomore	Georgia
Defense
LB	Nolan Smith	Senior	Georgia
DB	Christopher Smith II	Senior	Georgia
Special teams
WR/ST	Kearis Jackson	Senior	Georgia

Third Team

Position	Player	Class	Team
Offense
WR	Ladd McConkey	Junior	Georgia

== Schedule ==
Georgia and the SEC announced the 2022 football schedule on September 21, 2021.

Date	Time	Opponent	Rank	Site	TV	Result	Attendance
September 3	3:30 p.m.	vs. No. 11 Oregon*	No. 3	Mercedes-Benz Stadium; Atlanta, GA (Chick-fil-A Kickoff Game)	ABC	W 49–3	76,490
September 10	4:00 p.m.	Samford*	No. 2	Sanford Stadium; Athens, GA	SECN	W 33–0	92,746
September 17	12:00 p.m.	at South Carolina	No. 1	Williams–Brice Stadium; Columbia, SC (rivalry)	ESPN	W 48–7	78,212
September 24	12:00 p.m.	Kent State*	No. 1	Sanford Stadium; Athens, GA	SECN+/ESPN+	W 39–22	92,746
October 1	7:30 p.m.	at Missouri	No. 1	Faurot Field; Columbia, MO	SECN	W 26–22	58,165
October 8	3:30 p.m.	Auburn	No. 2	Sanford Stadium; Athens, GA (Deep South's Oldest Rivalry)	CBS	W 42–10	92,746
October 15	3:30 p.m.	Vanderbilt^{†}	No. 1	Sanford Stadium; Athens, GA (rivalry)	SECN	W 55–0	92,746
October 29	3:30 p.m.	vs. Florida	No. 1	TIAA Bank Field; Jacksonville, FL (rivalry / SEC Nation)	CBS	W 42–20	75,868
November 5	3:30 p.m.	No. 1 Tennessee	No. 3	Sanford Stadium; Athens, GA (rivalry / College Gameday / SEC Nation)	CBS	W 27–13	92,746
November 12	7:00 p.m.	at Mississippi State	No. 1	Davis Wade Stadium; Starkville, MS	ESPN	W 45–19	60,352
November 19	3:30 p.m.	at Kentucky	No. 1	Kroger Field; Lexington, KY	CBS	W 16–6	61,022
November 26	12:00 p.m.	Georgia Tech*	No. 1	Sanford Stadium; Athens, GA (Clean, Old-Fashioned Hate)	ESPN	W 37–14	92,746
December 3	4:00 p.m.	vs. No. 14 LSU	No. 1	Mercedes-Benz Stadium; Atlanta, GA (SEC Championship Game)	CBS	W 50–30	74,810
December 31	8:00 p.m.	vs. No. 4 Ohio State*	No. 1	Mercedes-Benz Stadium; Atlanta, GA (Peach Bowl–CFP Semifinal)	ESPN	W 42–41	79,330
January 9, 2023	7:30 p.m.	vs. No. 3 TCU*	No. 1	SoFi Stadium; Inglewood, CA (CFP National Championship)	ESPN	W 65–7	72,628
*Non-conference game; ^{†}Homecoming; Rankings from AP Poll (and CFP Rankings, after November 1) – Released prior to game; All times are in Eastern time

== Game summaries ==
=== vs No. 11 Oregon ===
Game One – No. 3 Georgia Bulldogs (0–0) vs No. 11 Oregon Ducks (0–0)

Quarter	1	2	3	4	Total
No. 11 Oregon	0	0	0	3	3
No. 3 Georgia	7	21	14	7	49

at Mercedes-Benz Stadium • Atlanta, Georgia

- Date: Saturday, September 3, 2022
- Game time: 3:30 p.m. EST
- Game weather: Indoor, 88 °F (31 °C)
- Game attendance: 76,490
- Referee: Mike Roche
- TV announcers (ABC): Sean McDonough (play-by-play), Todd Blackledge (color) and Molly McGrath (sideline)

Game information

First quarter

- (6:15) UGA – Ladd McConkey 9 Yd Run, Jack Podlesny Kick (Georgia 7–0)

Second quarter

- (14:55) UGA – Stetson Bennett 1 Yd Run, Jack Podlesny Kick (Georgia 14–0)
- (8:25) UGA – Kenny McIntosh 1 Yd Run, Jack Podlesny Kick (Georgia 21–0)
- (3:57) ORE – Camden Lewis 35 Yd Field Goal (Georgia 21–3)
- (0:21) UGA – Ladd McConkey 4 Yd Pass, Jack Podlesny Kick (Georgia 28–3)

Third quarter

- (12:17) UGA – Kendall Milton 12 Yd Run, Jack Podlesny Kick (Georgia 35–3)
- (5:20) UGA – Adonai Mitchell 18 Yd Pass, Jack Podlesny Kick (Georgia 42–3)

Fourth quarter

- (14:50) UGA – Kendall Milton 18 Yd Pass, Jack Podlesny Kick (Georgia 49–3)

Statistics	ORE	UGA
First downs	21	26
Plays–yards	68–313	62–571
Rushes–yards	140	132
Passing yards	173	439
Passing: comp–att–int	21–37–2	30–37–0
Turnovers		
Time of possession	28:50	31:10

Team	Category	Player	Statistics
Oregon	Passing	Bo Nix	21/37, 173 yards, 2 INT
Oregon	Rushing	Bo Nix	8 carries, 37 yards
Oregon	Receiving	Terrance Ferguson	4 receptions, 37 yards
Georgia	Passing	Stetson Bennett	25/31, 368 yards, 2 TD
Georgia	Rushing	Kendall Milton	8 carry, 50 yards, 1 TD
Georgia	Receiving	Kenny McIntosh	9 receptions, 117 yards

=== vs No. 25 (FCS) Samford ===
Game Two – No. 2 Georgia Bulldogs (1–0) vs. No. 25 (FCS) Samford Bulldogs (1–0)

Quarter	1	2	3	4	Total
No. 25 (FCS) Samford	0	0	0	0	0
No. 3 Georgia	13	17	0	3	33

at Sanford Stadium • Athens, Georgia

- Date: Saturday, September 10, 2022
- Game time: 4:00 p.m. EST
- Game weather: Clear • Temperature: – • Wind:
- Game attendance: 92,746
- Referee: Wayne Winkler
- TV announcers (SEC Network): Taylor Zarzour (play-by-play), Matt Stinchcomb (color) and Alyssa Lang (sideline)

Game information

First quarter

- (7:51) UGA – Jack Podlesny 27 Yd Field Goal (Georgia 3–0)
- (5:34) UGA – Jack Podlesny 25 Yd Field Goal (Georgia 6–0)
- (14:55) UGA – Stetson Bennett 3 Yd Run (Jack Podlesny Kick) (Georgia 13–0)

Second quarter

- (8:48) UGA – Dillon Bell 3 Yd pass from Stetson Bennett (Jack Podlesny Kick) (Georgia 20–0)
- (5:01) UGA – Jack Podlesny 26 Yd Field Goal (Georgia 23–0)
- (0:55) UGA – Kenny McIntosh 1 Yd Run (Jack Podlesny Kick) (Georgia 30–0)

Third quarter

no scoring

Fourth quarter

- (11:11) UGA – Jack Podlesny 25 Yd Field Goal (Georgia 33–0)

Statistics	SAM	UGA
First downs	3	25
Plays–yards	43–128	75–479
Rushes–yards	19	127
Passing yards	109	352
Passing: comp–att–int	16–26–0	29–43–0
Turnovers		
Time of possession	19:57	40:03

Team	Category	Player	Statistics
Samford	Passing	Michael Hiers	13/21, 62 yards
Samford	Rushing	Jay Stanton	5 carries, 12 yards
Samford	Receiving	Ty King	4 receptions, 52 yards
Georgia	Passing	Stetson Bennett	24/34, 300 yards, 1 TD
Georgia	Rushing	Kendall Milton	10 carry, 85 yards
Georgia	Receiving	Kenny McIntosh	5 receptions, 61 yards

=== vs South Carolina ===
Game Three – No. 1 Georgia Bulldogs (2–0) vs. South Carolina Gamecocks (1–1)

Quarter	1	2	3	4	Total
No. 1 Georgia	14	10	21	3	48
South Carolina	0	0	0	7	7

at Williams-Brice Stadium • Columbia, South Carolina

- Date: Saturday, September 17, 2022
- Game time: 12:00 p.m. EST
- Game weather: Clear • Temperature: – • Wind:
- Game attendance: 78,212
- Referee: Jason Autrey
- TV announcers (ESPN): Sean McDonough (play-by-play), Todd Blackledge (color) and Molly McGrath (sideline)

Game information

First quarter

- (8:20) UGA – Brock Bowers 5-yard run (Jack Podlesny Kick) (Georgia 7–0)
- (4:42) UGA – Kendall Milton 1 Yd Run (Jack Podlesny Kick) (Georgia 14–0)

Second quarter

- (11:25) UGA – Brock Bowers 6 Yd pass from Stetson Bennett (Jack Podlesny Kick) (Georgia 21–0)
- (0:30) UGA – Jack Podlesny 42 Yd Field Goal (Georgia 24–0)

Third quarter

- (13:21) UGA – Brock Bowers 78 Yd pass from Stetson Bennett (Jack Podlesny Kick) (Georgia 31–0)
- (7:13) UGA – Stetson Bennett 11 Yd Run (Jack Podlesny Kick) (Georgia 38–0)
- (6:00) UGA – Oscar Delp 28 Yd pass from Carson Beck (Jack Podlesny Kick) (Georgia 45–0)

Fourth quarter

- (8:57) UGA – Jared Zirkel 21 Yd Field Goal (Georgia 48–0)
- (0:53) SC – Traevon Kenion 13 Yd pass from Luke Doty (Mitch Jeter Kick)(Georgia 48–7)

Statistics	UGA	SC
First downs	30	17
Plays–yards	65–547	64–306
Rushes–yards	208	92
Passing yards	339	214
Passing: comp–att–int	21–30	19–34–3
Turnovers		
Time of possession	30:40	29:20

Team	Category	Player	Statistics
Georgia	Passing	Stetson Bennett	16/23, 284 yards, 2 TD
Georgia	Rushing	Stetson Bennett	3 carries, 36 yards, 1 TD
Georgia	Receiving	Brock Bowers	5 receptions, 121 yards, 2 TD
South Carolina	Passing	Spencer Rattler	13/25, 118 yards, 2 INT
South Carolina	Rushing	Juju McDowell	8 carry, 33 yards
South Carolina	Receiving	Jalen Brooks	5 receptions, 53 yards

=== vs Kent State ===
Game Four – No. 1 Georgia Bulldogs (3–0) vs. Kent State Golden Flashes (1–2)

Quarter	1	2	3	4	Total
Kent State	3	10	3	6	22
No. 1 Georgia	12	14	6	7	39

at Sanford Stadium • Athens, Georgia

- Date: Saturday, September 24, 2022
- Game time: 12:00 p.m. EST
- Game weather: Clear • Temperature: – • Wind:
- Game attendance: 92,746
- Referee: Kyle Olson
- TV announcers (SEC Network+ ESPN+): Taylor Zarzour (play-by-play), Matt Stinchcomb (color) and Alyssa Lang (sideline)

Game information

First quarter

- (14:41) UGA – Brock Bowers 75 Yd Run (Jack Podlesny Kick) (Georgia 7–0)
- (10:55) KENT – Andrew Glass 45 Yd Field Goal (Georgia 7–3)
- (6:51) UGA – Team Safety (Georgia 9–3)
- (1:07) UGA – Jack Podlesny 39 Yd Field Goal (Georgia 12–3)

Second quarter

- (11:30) KENT – Devontez Walker 56 Yd pass from Collin Schlee (Andrew Glass Kick) (Georgia 12–10)
- (8:15) UGA – Brock Bowers 2 Yd Run (Jack Podlesny Kick) (Georgia 19–10)
- (3:39) KENT – Andrew Glass 45 Yd Field Goal (Georgia 19–13)
- (0:08) UGA – Stetson Bennett 1 Yd Run (Jack Podlesny Kick) (Georgia 26–13)

Third quarter

- (10:41) UGA – Jack Podlesny 31 Yd Field Goal (Georgia 29–13)
- (5:12) KENT – Andrew Glass 22 Yd Field Goal (Georgia 29–16)
- (1:44) UGA – Jack Podlesny 32 Yd Field Goal (Georgia 32–16)

Fourth quarter

- (12:13) KENT – Marquez Cooper 1 Yd Run (Two-Point Pass Conversion Failed) (Georgia 32–22)
- (5:30) UGA – Kendall Milton 1 Yd Run (Jack Podlesny Kick) (Georgia 39–22)

Statistics	KENT	UGA
First downs	14	29
Plays–yards	52–281	77–529
Rushes–yards	93	257
Passing yards	188	272
Passing: comp–att–int	15–22–1	27–36–1
Turnovers		
Time of possession	23:00	37:00

Team	Category	Player	Statistics
Kent State	Passing	Collin Schlee	14/21, 174 yards, 1 TD, 1 INT
Kent State	Rushing	Marquez Cooper	21 carries, 90 yards, 1 TD
Kent State	Receiving	Devontez Walker	7 receptions, 106 yards, 1 TD
Georgia	Passing	Stetson Bennett	27/36, 272 yards, 1 INT
Georgia	Rushing	Brock Bowers	2 carry, 77 yards, 2 TD
Georgia	Receiving	Ladd McConkey	6 receptions, 65 yards

=== vs Missouri ===
Game Five – No. 1 Georgia Bulldogs (4–0) vs. Missouri Tigers (2–2)

Quarter	1	2	3	4	Total
No. 1 Georgia	0	6	6	14	26
Missouri	3	13	3	3	22

at Faurot Field • Columbia, Missouri

- Date: Saturday, October 1, 2022
- Game time: 7:30 p.m. EST
- Game weather: Clear • Temperature: – • Wind:
- Game attendance: 58,165
- Referee: Matt Loeffler
- TV announcers (SEC Network): Tom Hart (play-by-play), Jordan Rodgers (color) and Cole Cubelic (sideline)

Game information

First quarter

- (4:11) MIZ – Harrison Mevis 41 Yd Field Goal (Missouri 3–0)

Second quarter

- (12:43) MIZ – Tyler Stephens 10 Yd pass from Brady Cook (Harrison Mevis Kick) (Missouri 10–0)
- (8:53) MIZ – Harrison Mevis 49 Yd Field Goal (Missouri 13–0)
- (6:36) KENT – Jack Podlesny 40 Yd Field Goal (Missouri 13–3)
- (3:16) MIZ – Harrison Mevis 22 Yd Field Goal (Missouri 16–3)
- (0:00) UGA – Jack Podlesny 34 Yd Field Goal (Missouri 16–6)

Third quarter

- (5:53) UGA – Jack Podlesny 28 Yd Field Goal (Missouri 16–9)
- (4:31) MIZ – Harrison Mevis 52 Yd Field Goal (Missouri 19–9)
- (2:15) UGA – Jack Podlesny 29 Yd Field Goal (Missouri 19–12)

Fourth quarter

- (14:09) MIZ – Harrison Mevis 56 Yd Field Goal (Missouri 22–12)
- (9:39) UGA – Kendall Milton 1 Yd Run (Jack Podlesny Kick) (Missouri 22–19)
- (4:03) UGA – Daijun Edwards 1 Yd Run (Jack Podlesny Kick) (Georgia 26–22)

Statistics	UGA	MIZ
First downs	28	14
Plays–yards	79–481	53–294
Rushes–yards	169	102
Passing yards	312	192
Passing: comp–att–int	24–43	20–32
Turnovers		
Time of possession	34:48	25:12

Team	Category	Player	Statistics
Georgia	Passing	Stetson Bennett	24/43, 312 yards
Georgia	Rushing	Kenny McIntosh	11 carries, 65 yards
Georgia	Receiving	Brock Bowers	5 receptions, 66 yards
Missouri	Passing	Brady Cook	20/32, 192 yards, 1 TD
Missouri	Rushing	Cody Schrader	6 carries, 89 yards
Missouri	Receiving	Dominic Lovett	6 receptions, 84 yards

=== vs Auburn ===
Game Six – No. 2 Georgia Bulldogs (5–0) vs. Auburn Tigers (3–2)

Quarter	1	2	3	4	Total
Auburn	0	0	3	7	10
No. 2 Georgia	0	14	7	21	42

at Sanford Stadium • Athens, Georgia

- Date: Saturday, October 8, 2022
- Game time: 3:30 p.m. EST
- Game weather: Clear • Temperature: – • Wind:
- Game attendance: 92,746
- Referee: James Carter
- TV announcers (CBS): Tom McCarthy (play-by-play), Rick Neuheisel (color) and Sherree Burruss (sideline)

Game information

First quarter

no scoring

Second quarter

- (11:42) UGA – Kenny McIntosh 1 Yd Run (Jack Podlesny Kick) (Georgia 7-0)
- (8:45) UGA – Daijun Edwards 1 Yd Run (Jack Podlesny Kick) (Georgia 14-0)

Third quarter

- (11:51) AUB – Anders Carlson 29 Yd Field Goal (Georgia 14–3)
- (7:07) UGA – Daijun Edwards 2 Yd Run (Jack Podlesny Kick) (Georgia 21–3)

Fourth quarter

- (14:49) UGA – Stetson Bennett 64 Yd Run (Jack Podlesny Kick) (Georgia 28–3)
- (11:10) UGA – Daijun Edwards 7 Yd Run (Jack Podlesny Kick) (Georgia 35–3)
- (9:51) AUB – Jarquez Hunter 62 Yd pass from Robby Ashford (Anders Carlson Kick) (Georgia 35–10)
- (4:45) UGA – Branson Robinson 15 Yd Run (Jack Podlesny Kick) (Georgia 42–10)

Statistics	AUB	UGA
First downs	10	22
Plays–yards	63–258	71–500
Rushes–yards	93	292
Passing yards	165	208
Passing: comp–att–int	13–38	22–32
Turnovers		
Time of possession	24:31	35:29

Team	Category	Player	Statistics
Auburn	Passing	Robby Ashford	13/38, 165 yards, 1 TD
Auburn	Rushing	Robby Ashford	9 carries, 52 yards
Auburn	Receiving	Jarquez Hunter	3 receptions, 73 yards, 1 TD
Georgia	Passing	Stetson Bennett	22/32, 208 yards
Georgia	Rushing	Branson Robinson	12 carry, 98 yards, 1 TD
Georgia	Receiving	Ladd McConkey	5 receptions, 47 yards

=== vs Vanderbilt ===
Game Seven – No. 1 Georgia Bulldogs (6–0) vs. Vanderbilt Commodores (3–3)

Quarter	1	2	3	4	Total
Vanderbilt	0	0	0	0	0
No. 1 Georgia	14	14	6	21	55

at Sanford Stadium • Athens, Georgia

- Date: Saturday, October 15, 2022
- Game time: 3:30 p.m. EST
- Game weather: Clear • Temperature: – • Wind:
- Game attendance: 92,746
- Referee: Steve Marlowe
- TV announcers (SEC Network): Taylor Zarzour (play-by-play), Matt Stinchcomb (color) and Alyssa Lang (sideline)

Game information

First quarter

- (10:01) UGA – Kenny McIntosh 11 Yd pass from Stetson Bennett (Jack Podlesny Kick) (Georgia 7-0)
- (1:40) UGA – Kenny McIntosh 7 Yd Run (Jack Podlesny Kick) (Georgia 14-0)

Second quarter

- (9:00) UGA – Daijun Edwards 1 Yd Run (Jack Podlesny Kick) (Georgia 21–0)
- (1:06) UGA – Dominick Blaylock 10 Yd pass from Stetson Bennett (Jack Podlesny Kick) (Georgia 28–0)

Third quarter

- (9:09) UGA – Jack Podlesny 28 Yd Field Goal (Georgia 31–0)
- (1:40) UGA – Jack Podlesny 35 Yd Field Goal (Georgia 34–0)

Fourth quarter

- (14:49) UGA – Dillon Bell 24 Yd pass from Carson Beck (Jack Podlesny Kick) (Georgia 41–0)
- (11:10) UGA – Arik Gilbert 4 Yd pass from Carson Beck (Jack Podlesny Kick) (Georgia 48–0)
- (4:45) UGA – Cash Jones 36 Yd Run (Jack Podlesny Kick) (Georgia 55–0)

Statistics	VAN	UGA
First downs	10	30
Plays–yards	47–150	79–579
Rushes–yards	45	192
Passing yards	105	387
Passing: comp–att–int	12–24	32–41
Turnovers		
Time of possession	21:00	39:00

Team	Category	Player	Statistics
Vanderbilt	Passing	AJ Swann	12/23, 105 yards
Vanderbilt	Rushing	Ray Davis	12 carries, 29 yards
Vanderbilt	Receiving	Will Sheppard	3 receptions, 45 yards
Georgia	Passing	Stetson Bennett	24/30, 289 yards, 2 TD
Georgia	Rushing	Daijun Edwards	10 carry, 49 yards, 1 TD
Georgia	Receiving	Darnell Washington	4 receptions, 78 yards

=== vs Florida ===
Game Eight – No. 1 Georgia Bulldogs (7–0) vs Florida Gators (4–3)

Quarter	1	2	3	4	Total
Florida	0	3	17	0	20
No. 1 Georgia	14	14	7	7	42

at TIAA Bank Field • Jacksonville, Florida

- Date: Saturday, October 29, 2022
- Game time: 3:30 p.m. EST
- Game weather: Clear • Temperature: 68 °F (20 °C) • Wind: NE at 7 miles per hour (11 km/h)
- Game attendance: 75,868
- Referee: Scott Walker
- TV announcers (CBS): Brad Nessler (play-by-play), Gary Danielson (color) and Jenny Dell (sideline)

Game information

First quarter

- (7:15) UGA – Daijun Edwards 1 Yd Run (Jack Podlesny Kick) (Georgia 7–0)
- (1:30) UGA – Kenny McIntosh 2 Yd Run (Jack Podlesny Kick) (Georgia 14–0)

Second quarter

- (12:36) UGA – Brock Bowers 73 Yd pass from Stetson Bennett (Jack Podlesny Kick) (Georgia 21–0)
- (5:35) FLA – Adam Mihalek 52 Yd Field Goal (Georgia 21–3)
- (0:17) UGA – Ladd McConkey 7 Yd pass from Stetson Bennett (Jack Podlesny Kick) (Georgia 28–3)

Third quarter

- (9:34) FLA – Trevor Etienne 3 Yd Run (Adam Mihalek Kick) (Georgia 28–10)
- (6:07) FLA – Adam Mihalek 26 Yd Field Goal (Georgia 28–13)
- (3:31) FLA – Xzavier Henderson 78 Yd pass from Anthony Richardson (Adam Mihalek Kick) (Georgia 28–20)

(0:35) UGA – Daijun Edwards 22 Yd Run (Jack Podlesny Kick) (Georgia 35–20)

Fourth quarter

- (11:44) UGA – Kendall Milton 18 Yd Pass, Jack Podlesny Kick (Georgia 42–20)

Statistics	FLA	UGA
First downs	16	26
Plays–yards	71–371	78–555
Rushes–yards	100	239
Passing yards	271	316
Passing: comp–att–int	18–37–0	19–38–2
Turnovers		
Time of possession	28:43	31:17

Team	Category	Player	Statistics
Florida	Passing	Anthony Richardson	18/37, 271 yards, 1 TD
Florida	Rushing	Trevor Etienne	11 carries, 53 yards, 1 TD
Florida	Receiving	Xzavier Henderson	5 receptions, 110 yards, 1 TD
Georgia	Passing	Stetson Bennett	19/38, 316 yards, 2 TD, 2 INT
Georgia	Rushing	Daijun Edwards	12 carries, 106 yards, 2 TD
Georgia	Receiving	Brock Bowers	5 receptions, 154 yards, 1 TD

=== vs No. 1 Tennessee ===
Game Nine – No. 1 Tennessee Volunteers (8–0) vs No. 3 Georgia Bulldogs (8–0)

Quarter	1	2	3	4	Total
No. 1 Tennessee	3	3	0	7	13
No. 3 Georgia	14	10	3	0	27

at Sanford Stadium • Athens, Georgia

- Date: Saturday, November 5, 2022
- Game time: 3:30 p.m. EST
- Game weather: Clear • Temperature: 76 °F (24 °C) • Wind:
- Game attendance: 92,746
- Referee: Jason Autrey
- TV announcers (CBS): Brad Nessler (play-by-play), Gary Danielson (color) and Jenny Dell (sideline)

Game information

First quarter

- (10:05) TENN – Chase McGrath 47 Yd Field Goal (Tennessee 3–0)
- (8:32) UGA – Stetson Bennett 13 Yd Run (Jack Podlesny Kick) (Georgia 7-3)
- (3:32) UGA - Ladd McConkey 37 Yd pass from Stetson Bennett (Jack Podlesny Kick) (Georgia 14–3)

Second quarter

- (14:17) UGA – Marcus Rosemy-Jacksaint 5 Yd pass from Stetson Bennett (Jack Podlesny Kick) (Georgia 21–3)
- (5:35) TENN – Chase McGrath 36 Yd Field Goal (Georgia 21–6)
- (0:17) UGA – Jack Podlesny 19 Yd Field Goal (Georgia 24–6)

Third quarter

- (9:34) UGA – Jack Podlesny 38 Yd Field Goal (Georgia 27–6)

Fourth quarter

- (11:44) TENN – Jaylen Wright 5 Yd Run (Chase McGrath Kick) (Georgia 27–13)

Statistics	TENN	UGA
First downs	21	18
Plays–yards	75–289	62–387
Rushes–yards	94	130
Passing yards	195	257
Passing: comp–att–int	23–33–1	17–25–0
Turnovers		
Time of possession	29:00	31:00

Team	Category	Player	Statistics
Tennessee	Passing	Hendon Hooker	23/33, 195 yards, INT
Tennessee	Rushing	Jaylen Wright	21 carries, 69 yards, TD
Tennessee	Receiving	Cedric Tillman	7 receptions, 68 yards
Georgia	Passing	Stetson Bennett	17/25, 257 yards, 2 TD
Georgia	Rushing	Kenny McIntosh	10 carries, 52 yards
Georgia	Receiving	Ladd McConkey	5 receptions, 94 yards, 1 TD

=== Vs. Mississippi State ===
Game Ten – No. 1 Georgia Bulldogs (9–0) vs Mississippi State Bulldogs (6–3)

Quarter	1	2	3	4	Total
No. 1 Georgia	7	10	14	14	45
Mississippi State	0	12	7	0	19

at Davis Wade Stadium • Starkville, Mississippi

- Date: Saturday, November 12, 2022
- Game time: 7:00 p.m. EST
- Game weather: Clear • Temperature: – • Wind:
- Game attendance: 60,352
- Referee: Jason Autrey
- TV announcers (ESPN): Sean McDonough (play-by-play), Todd Blackledge (color)

Game information

First quarter

- (9:50) UGA – Brock Bowers 2 Yd pass from Stetson Bennett (Jack Podlesny Kick) (Georgia 7-0)

Second quarter

- (11:57) UGA – Jack Podlesny 28 Yd Field Goal (Georgia 10-0)
- (5:01) MSST – Massimo Biscardi 25 Yd Field Goal (Georgia 10–3)
- (2:29) UGA – Stetson Bennett 4 Yd Run (Jack Podlesny Kick) (Georgia 17–3)
- (0:51) MSST – Massimo Biscardi 36 Yd Field Goal (Georgia 17–6)
- (0:03) MSST – Zavion Thomas 63 Yd Punt Return (2-PT Pass Conversion Failed) (Georgia 17–12)

Third quarter

- (14:13) UGA – Ladd McConkey 70 Yd Run (Jack Podlesny Kick) (Georgia 24–12)
- (9:19) UGA – Ladd McConkey 17 Yd pass from Stetson Bennett (Jack Podlesny Kick) (Georgia 31–12)
- (5:17) MSST – Rufus Harvey 6 Yd pass from Will Rogers (Massimo Biscardi Kick) (Georgia 31–19)

Fourth quarter

- (14:55) UGA – Darnell Washington 2 Yd pass from Stetson Bennett (Jack Podlesny Kick) (Georgia 38–19)
- (2:04) UGA – Kendall Milton 34 Yd Run (Jack Podlesny Kick) (Georgia 45–19)

Statistics	UGA	MSST
First downs	21	18
Plays–yards	70–468	67–308
Rushes–yards	179	47
Passing yards	289	261
Passing: comp–att–int	25–37–2	29–52–0
Turnovers		
Time of possession	31:43	28:17

Team	Category	Player	Statistics
Georgia	Passing	Stetson Bennett	25/37, 289 yards, 3 TD, 2 INT
Georgia	Rushing	Ladd McConkey	1 carry, 70 yards, TD
Georgia	Receiving	Ladd McConkey	5 receptions, 71 yards, TD
Mississippi State	Passing	Will Rogers	29/51, 261 yards, TD
Mississippi State	Rushing	Joquavious Marks	7 carries, 41 yards
Mississippi State	Receiving	Rufus Harvey	6 receptions, 64 yards, TD

=== Vs. Kentucky ===
Game Eleven – No. 1 Georgia Bulldogs (10–0) vs Kentucky Wildcats (6–4)

Quarter	1	2	3	4	Total
No. 1 Georgia	3	6	7	0	16
Kentucky	0	0	0	6	6

at Kroger Field • Lexington, Kentucky

- Date: Saturday, November 19, 2022
- Game time: 3:30 p.m. EST
- Game weather: Clear • Temperature: – • Wind:
- Game attendance: 61,022
- Referee: James Carter
- TV announcers (CBS): Brad Nessler (play-by-play), Gary Danielson (color)

Game information

First quarter

- (2:56) UGA – Jack Podlesny 27 Yd Field Goal (Georgia 3-0)

Second quarter

- (3:40) UGA – Jack Podlesny 24 Yd Field Goal (Georgia 6-0)
- (0:00) UGA – Jack Podlesny 37 Yd Field Goal (Georgia 9-0)

Third quarter

- (6:22) UGA – Kenny McIntosh 9 Yd Run (Jack Podlesny Kick) (Georgia 16–0)

Fourth quarter

- (9:52) UK – Barion Brown 8 Yd pass from Will Levis (2-PT Pass Conversion Failed) (Georgia 16–6)

Statistics	UGA	UK
First downs	20	17
Plays–yards	65–363	56–295
Rushes–yards	247	89
Passing yards	116	206
Passing: comp–att–int	13–19–1	20–31–1
Turnovers		
Time of possession	30:02	29:58

Team	Category	Player	Statistics
Georgia	Passing	Stetson Bennett	13/19, 116 yards, INT
Georgia	Rushing	Kenny McIntosh	19 carries, 143 yards, TD
Georgia	Receiving	Dominick Blaylock	2 receptions, 38 yards
Kentucky	Passing	Will Levis	20/31, 206 yards, TD, INT
Kentucky	Rushing	Chris Rodriguez Jr.	17 carries, 51 yards
Kentucky	Receiving	Barion Brown	10 receptions, 145 yards, TD

=== Vs. Georgia Tech ===
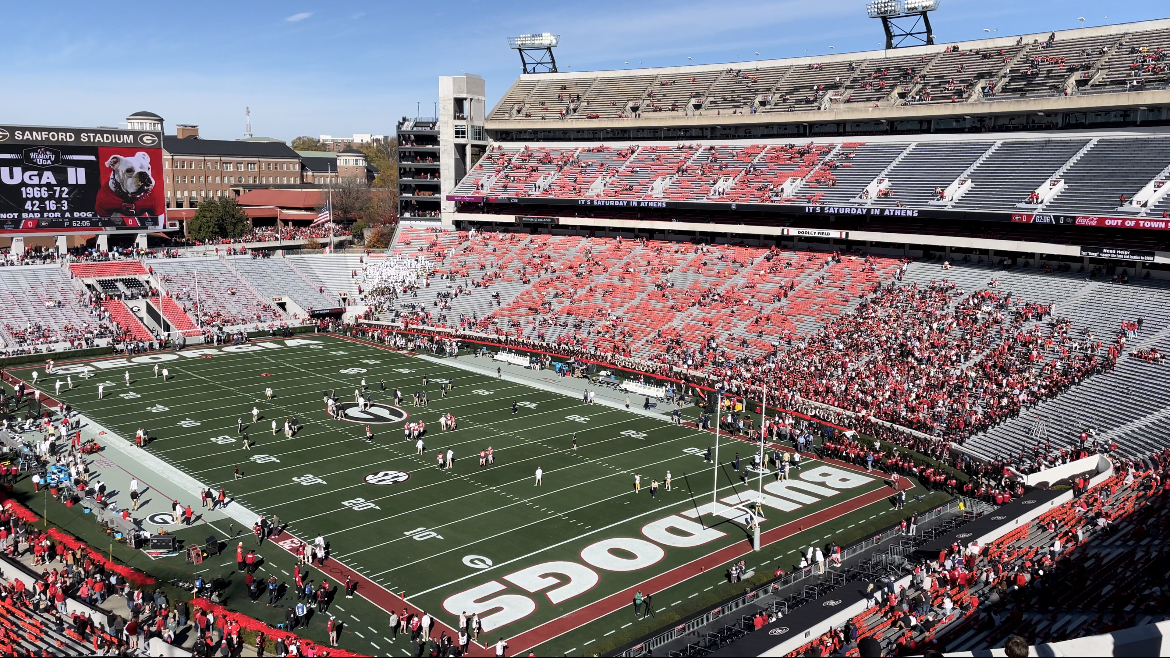
Sanford Stadium on November 26, 2022

Game Twelve – Georgia Tech Yellow Jackets (5–6) vs No. 1 Georgia Bulldogs (11–0)

Quarter	1	2	3	4	Total
Georgia Tech	7	0	0	7	14
No. 1 Georgia	3	7	13	14	37

at Sanford Stadium • Athens, Georgia

- Date: Saturday, November 26, 2022
- Game time: 12:00 p.m. EST
- Game weather: Sunny • Temperature: 62 °F (17 °C) • Wind: E 8 miles per hour (13 km/h)
- Game attendance: 92,746
- Referee: Lee Hedrick
- TV announcers (ESPN): Bob Wischusen (play-by-play), Dan Orlovsky (color)

Game information

First quarter

- (10:43) GT – Taisun Phommachanh 7 Yd Run (Gavin Stewart Kick) (Georgia Tech 7–0)
- (0:18) UGA – Jack Podlesny 30 Yd Field Goal (Georgia Tech 7-3)

Second quarter

- (7:59) UGA – Marcus Rosemy-Jacksaint 5 Yd pass from Stetson Bennett (Jack Podlesny Kick) (Georgia 10–7)

Third quarter

- (10:40) UGA – Jack Podlesny 50 Yd Field Goal (Georgia 13–7)
- (5:51) UGA – Brock Bowers 1 Yd pass from Stetson Bennett (Jack Podlesny Kick) (Georgia 20–7)
- (4:11) UGA – Jack Podlesny 36 Yd Field Goal (Georgia 23–7)

Fourth quarter

- (13:45) UGA – Kenny McIntosh 2 Yd Run (Jack Podlesny Kick) (Georgia 30–7)
- (11:13) UGA – Kendall Milton 44 Yd Run (Jack Podlesny Kick) (Georgia 37–7)
- (2:55) GT – Malachi Carter 24 Yd pass from Dontae Smith (Gavin Stewart Kick) (Georgia 37–14)

Statistics	GT	UGA
First downs	15	16
Plays–yards	64–255	61–407
Rushes–yards	40	264
Passing yards	215	143
Passing: comp–att–int	20–36–0	11–20–0
Turnovers		
Time of possession	28:54	31:06

Team	Category	Player	Statistics
Georgia Tech	Passing	Zach Gibson	19/35, 191 yards
Georgia Tech	Rushing	Dontae Smith	10 carries, 34 yards
Georgia Tech	Receiving	Nate McCollum	6 receptions, 65 yards
Georgia	Passing	Stetson Bennett	10/18, 140 yards, 2 TD
Georgia	Rushing	Kenny McIntosh	12 carries, 86 yards, TD
Georgia	Receiving	Kenny McIntosh	2 receptions, 96 yards

=== Vs. LSU (SEC Championship) ===
SEC Championship – No. 14 LSU Tigers (9–3, 6–2) vs No. 1 Georgia Bulldogs (12–0, 8–0)

Quarter	1	2	3	4	Total
No. 14 LSU	7	3	13	7	30
No. 1 Georgia	14	21	7	8	50

at Mercedes-Benz Stadium • Atlanta, Georgia

- Date: Saturday, December 3, 2022
- Game time: 4:00 p.m. EST
- Game weather: Indoor
- TV announcers (CBS): Brad Nessler (play-by-play), Gary Danielson (color), Jenny Dell (sideline)

Game information

First quarter

- (3:33) UGA - Damian Ramos 32 yd FG BLOCKED by Nazir Stackhouse, Christopher Smith II return for 95 yds for a TD (Jack Podlesny Kick) (Georgia 7-0)
- (2:21) LSU - Kayshon Boutte 53 yd pass from Jayden Daniels (Damian Ramos Kick) (Tied 7–7)
- (0:03) UGA – Brock Bowers 4 yd pass from Stetson Bennett (Jack Podlesny Kick) (Georgia 14–7)

Second quarter

- (14:43) UGA – Ladd McConkey 22 yd pass from Stetson Bennett (Jack Podlesny Kick) (Georgia 21–7)
- (2:48) UGA – Darnell Washington 14 yd pass from Stetson Bennett (Jack Podlesny Kick) (Georgia 28–7)
- (0:32) UGA – Dillon Bell 3 yd pass from Stetson Bennett (Jack Podlesny Kick) (Georgia 35–7)
- (0:01) LSU – Damian Ramos 42 yd Field Goal (Georgia 35–10)

Third quarter

- (10:33) LSU – Malik Nabers 34 yd pass from Garrett Nussmeier (Damian Ramos Kick) (Georgia 35–17)
- (3:32) UGA – Kenny McIntosh 2 yd Run (Jack Podlesny Kick) (Georgia 42–17)
- (1:46) LSU – Noah Cain 1 yd Run (2-PT Pass Conversion Failed) (Georgia 42–23)

Fourth quarter

- (13:13) UGA – Kenny McIntosh 8 yd Run (Adonai Mitchell pass to Darnell Washington for 2-PT Conversion) (Georgia 50–23)
- (7:12) LSU – Jaray Jenkins 33 yd pass from Garrett Nussmeier (Damian Ramos Kick) (Georgia 50–30)

Statistics	LSU	UGA
First downs	23	27
Plays–yards	72–549	73–529
Rushes–yards	47	255
Passing yards	502	274
Passing: comp–att–int	31–52–2	23–29–0
Turnovers		
Time of possession	24:02	35:58

Team	Category	Player	Statistics
LSU	Passing	Garrett Nussmeier	15/27, 294 yards, 2 TD, INT
LSU	Rushing	Josh Williams	6 carries, 55 yards
LSU	Receiving	Malik Nabers	5 receptions, 128 yards, TD
Georgia	Passing	Stetson Bennett	23/29, 274 yards, 4 TD
Georgia	Rushing	Kendall Milton	8 carries, 113 yards
Georgia	Receiving	Brock Bowers	6 receptions, 81 yards, TD

=== Vs. Ohio State (Peach Bowl–CFP Semifinal) ===
No. 4 Ohio State Buckeyes (11–1) vs. No. 1 Georgia Bulldogs (13–0) – Game summary

Quarter	1	2	3	4	Total
No. 4 Ohio State	7	21	10	3	41
No. 1 Georgia	7	17	0	18	42

at Mercedes-Benz Stadium, Atlanta, Georgia

- Date: December 31
- Game time: 8:00 p.m. EST
- Game weather: Indoors
- Game attendance: 79,330
- Referee: Chris Coyte
- TV announcers (ESPN): Chris Fowler (play-by-play), Kirk Herbstreit (analyst), Holly Rowe (sidelines), and Laura Rutledge (sidelines)
- Spread: Georgia −5.5 • Odds to win: Georgia 57.7% •

Game information

First quarter

- (10:56) OSU – Marvin Harrison Jr. 31 yd pass from C. J. Stroud (Noah Ruggles Kick) (Ohio State 7–0)
- (3:15) UGA – Kenny McIntosh 25 yd pass from Stetson Bennett (Jack Podlesny Kick) (Tied 7–7)

Second quarter

- (12:30) OSU – Miyan Williams 2 yd Run (Noah Ruggles Kick) (Ohio State 14–7)
- (10:56) OSU – Marvin Harrison Jr. 16 yd pass from C. J. Stroud (Noah Ruggles Kick) (Ohio State 21–7)
- (9:16) UGA – Kendall Milton 11 yd run (Jack Podlesny Kick) (Ohio State 21–14)
- (6:07) UGA – Stetson Bennett 3 yd run (Tied 21–21)
- (1:44) UGA – Jack Podlesny 32 yd Field Goal (Georgia 21–24)
- (0:49) OSU – Xavier Johnson 37 yd pass from C. J. Stroud (Noah Ruggles Kick) (Ohio State 28–24)

Third quarter

- (10:37) OSU – Emeka Egbuka 10 yd pass from C. J. Stroud (Noah Ruggles Kick) (Ohio State 35–24)
- (0:31) OSU – Noah Ruggles 25 yd Field Goal (Ohio State 38–24)

Fourth quarter

- (10:14) UGA – Jack Podlesny 31 yd Field Goal (Ohio State 38–27)
- (8:41) UGA – Arian Smith 76 Yd pass from Stetson Bennett (Stetson Bennett pass to Ladd McConkey for 2-PT Conversion (Ohio State 38–35)
- (2:43) OSU – Noah Ruggles 48 yd Field Goal (Ohio State 41–35)
- (0:54) UGA – Adonai Mitchell 10 Yd pass from Stetson Bennett (Jack Podlesny Kick) (Georgia 41–42)

Statistics	No. 4 Ohio State	No. 1 Georgia
First downs	24	22
Plays–yards	66–467	60–533
Rushes–yards	32–119	26–135
Passing yards	348	398
Passing: comp–att–int	23–34–0	23–34–1
Turnovers		
Time of possession	32:36	27:24

Team	Category	Player	Statistics
No. 4 Ohio State	Passing	C. J. Stroud	23/34, 348 yards, 4 TD
No. 4 Ohio State	Rushing	Dallan Hayden	9 carries, 43 yards
No. 4 Ohio State	Receiving	Emeka Egbuka	8 receptions, 112 yards, TD
No. 1 Georgia	Passing	Stetson Bennett	23/34, 398 yards, 3 TD, INT
No. 1 Georgia	Rushing	Kenny McIntosh	5 carries, 70 yards
No. 1 Georgia	Receiving	Arian Smith	3 receptions, 129 yards, TD

=== vs No. 3 TCU (National Championship) ===
No. 3 TCU Horned Frogs (13–1) vs No. 1 Georgia Bulldogs (14–0)

Quarter	1	2	3	4	Total
No. 3 Horned Frogs	7	0	0	0	7
No. 1 Bulldogs	17	21	14	13	65

at SoFi Stadium • Los Angeles, California

- Date: January 9
- Game time: 6:45 p.m. CST
- Game weather: Indoors
- Game attendance: 72,628
- Referee: Jeff Heaser
- TV announcers (ESPN): Chris Fowler (play-by-play), Kirk Herbstreit (analysts), Molly McGrath (sideline reporter), Holly Rowe (sideline reporter)
- Box Score

Game information

1st quarter
2nd quarter
3rd quarter
4th quarter

Statistics	No. 3 TCU	No. 1 Georgia
First downs	9	32
Total yards	188	589
Rushes/yards	28–36	44–254
Passing yards	152	335
Passing: Comp–Att–Int	14–23–2	20–28–0
Time of possession	23:01	36:59

Team	Category	Player	Statistics
No. 3 TCU	Passing	Max Duggan	14/22, 152 yards, 2 INT
No. 3 TCU	Rushing	Emari Demercado	14 carries, 59 yards
No. 3 TCU	Receiving	Derius Davis	5 receptions, 101 yards
No. 1 Georgia	Passing	Stetson Bennett	18/25, 304 yards, 4 TD
No. 1 Georgia	Rushing	Kenny McIntosh	8 carries, 50 yards
No. 1 Georgia	Receiving	Brock Bowers	7 receptions, 152 yards, TD

== Rankings ==
Ranking movements Legend: ██ Increase in ranking ██ Decrease in ranking ( ) = First-place votes
	Week															
Poll	Pre	1	2	3	4	5	6	7	8	9	10	11	12	13	14	Final
AP	3 (3)	2 (17)	1 (53)	1 (59)	1 (55)	2 (28)	1 (32)	1 (31)	1 (31)	1 (30)	1 (62)	1 (62)	1 (62)	1 (58)	1 (62)	1 (63)
Coaches	3 (6)	2 (6)	2 (25)	1 (40)	1 (34)	2 (23)	2 (18)	1 (43)	1 (43)	1 (45)	1 (61)	1 (61)	1 (59)	1 (60)	1 (59)	1 (63)
CFP	Not released									3	1	1	1	1	1	Not released

== Personnel ==
=== Coaching staff ===
Name	Position	Consecutive season at Georgia in current position
Kirby Smart	Head coach	7th
Todd Monken	Offensive coordinator / quarterbacks coach	3rd
Stacy Searels	Offensive line coach	1st
Scott Cochran	Special teams coordinator	3rd
Will Muschamp	Defensive coordinator/safeties coach	1st
Glenn Schumann	Co-defensive coordinator/inside linebackers coach	4th
Chidera Uzo-Diribe	Outside linebackers coach	1st
Bryan McClendon	Pass game coordinator/wide receivers coach	1st
Dell McGee	Run game coordinator/running backs coach	4th
Todd Hartley	Tight ends coach	4th
Tray Scott	Defensive line coach	6th
Fran Brown	Defensive back coach	1st
Scott Sinclair	Strength and conditioning coach	2nd

Football support staff

- Eric Black – Director of football creative – football
- Mike Cavan – Director of football administration
- Austin Chambers – Assistant director of player development
- Jay Chapman – Director of football management
- David Cooper – Director of recruiting relations
- Anna Courson – Football operations assistant
- Chandler Eldridge – Co-director of football creative – design
- Hunter Parker – Football operations assistant
- Bryant Gantt – Director of player support and operations
- Matt Godwin – Player personnel coordinator
- Christina Harris – Director of recruiting administration
- Hailey Hughes – Football operations coordinator
- Ann Hunt – Administrative assistant to head coach
- Jonas Jennings – Director of player development
- Angela Kirkpatrick – On-campus recruiting coordinator
- Jeremy Klawsky – Director of football technology
- Collier Madaleno – Director of football performance nutrition
- John Meshad – Director of equipment operations
- Chad Morehead – Co-director of football creative design
- Neyland Raper – Assistant director of football operations & recruiting
- Logen Reed – Assistant recruiting coordinator
- Maurice Sims – Associate director of strength and conditioning
- Juwan Taylor – Player development assistant
- Meaghan Turcotte – Assistant director of football performance nutrition
- Tersoo Uhaa – Assistant strength and sonditioning coach
- Gage Whitten – Director of football equipment and apparel

Graduate assistants

- Garrett Murphy – Defensive assistant
- Adam Ray – Special teams assistant
- Jacob Russell – Offensive assistant
- Rashawn Scott – Offensive assistant

Analysts

- Mike Bobo – Offensive analyst
- Kirk Benedict
- Buster Faulkner
- Davis Merritt
- Rob Muschamp
- Montgomery VanGorder

=== Depth chart ===
Defense

FS
Malaki Starks
Jacorey Thomas
–

Star	Mac	Money	Outside Linebacker
Javon Bullard; OR Tykee Smith	Smael Mondon	Jamon Dumas-Johnson	Robert Beal Jr.
Marcus Washington	Trezmen Marshall	Rian Davis	Chaz Chambliss
–	Xavian Sorey	Jalon Walker	MJ Sherman; OR Marvin Jones Jr. OR Darris Smith; OR C.J. Madden

SS
Christopher Smith II
David Daniel-Sisavanh
–

CB
Kelee Ringo
Nyland Green
Jaheim Singletary

DE	NT	DE
Jalen Carter	Nazir Stackhouse	Tramel Walthour; OR Mykel Williams
Warren Brinson	Zion Logue	Tyrion Ingram-Dawkins
Bill Norton	Bear Alexander	–

CB
Kamari Lassiter
Daylen Everette
Julian Humphrey

Offense

WR-X
Marcus Rosemy-Jacksaint
Adonai Mitchell
Dillon Bell
–

WR-Y / WR-A
Ladd McConkey
Arian Smith
Jackson Meeks
De'Nylon Morrissette

LT	LG	C	RG	RT
Broderick Jones; OR Amarius Mims	Xavier Truss; OR Devin Willock	Sedrick Van Pran-Granger	Tate Ratledge; OR Jared Wilson	Warren McClendon; OR Amarius Mims
Chad Lindberg	Micah Morris	Warren Erickson	Dylan Fairchild	Chad Lindberg
–	–	Austin Blaske	–	–

TE
Brock Bowers
Darnell Washington
Arik Gilbert
Oscar Delp

WR-Z
Kearis Jackson
Dominick Blaylock
Mekhi Mews
–

QB
Stetson Bennett
Carson Beck
Brock Vandagriff

Key reserves
Offense
Defense
Special teams
Out (indefinitely)
Out (season)
Out (suspended)
Out (retired)

RB
Kenny McIntosh
Kendall Milton
Daijun Edwards
Branson Robinson

Special teams
PK Jack Podlesny
PK Jared Zirkel
P Brett Thorson
P Noah Jones
KR Kenny McIntosh
OR Daijun Edwards
OR Kearis Jackson
OR Malaki Starks
OR Cole Speer
PR Kearis Jackson
OR Dominick Blaylock
OR Ladd McConkey
OR Mekhi Mews
LS Payne Walker
OR William Mote
H Stetson Bennett IV

True Freshman

== Statistics ==
=== Team ===
	Georgia	Opp
Scoring	422	64
Points per game	38.4	64
First downs	275	21
Rushing	108	
Passing	152	
Penalty	15	
Rushing yards	2172	140
Avg per play	5.4	
Avg per game	197.5	
Rushing touchdowns	33	
Passing yards	3287	173
Att-comp-int	259–381	
Avg per pass	8.6	4.7
Avg per catch		
Avg per game	298.8	
Passing touchdowns	18	
Total offense	5459	
Avg per play		
Avg per game	496.3	
Fumbles–lost	13–8	
Penalties–yards	48–495	
Avg per game		

	Georgia	Opp
Punts–yards	39.2	
Avg per punt		
Time of possession/game	33:50	
3rd down conversions	81.88	
4th down conversions	81.82	
Touchdowns scored	28	
Field goals–attempts	21–23	
PAT–attempts		
Attendance	92,746	
Games/Avg per game	92,746	
Neutral site		

=== Individual leaders ===
Passing statistics
#	NAME	POS	RAT	CMP	ATT	YDS	AVG/G	CMP%	TD	INT	LONG
13	Stetson Bennett	QB	161.2	310	454	4127	275	68.3	27	7	83
15	Carson Beck	QB	186.4	26	35	310	44.2	74.3	4	0	28
12	Brock Vandagriff	QB	0	0	2	0	0	0	0	0	0
	TOTALS		162.0	336	492	4437	296	68.3%	31	7	83

Rushing statistics
#	NAME	POS	ATT	YDS	AVG	TD	LONG	AVG/G
6	Kenny McIntosh	RB	150	829	5.5	10	52	55
30	Daijun Edwards	RB	140	769	5.5	7	28	51
2	Kendall Milton	RB	85	592	7.0	8	51	45
22	Branson Robinson	RB	68	330	4.9	3	30	27
13	Stetson Bennett	QB	57	205	3.6	10	64	13
84	Ladd McConkey	WR	7	134	19.1	2	70	9
19	Brock Bowers	TE	9	109	12.1	3	75	7
20	Sevaughn Clark	RB	7	44	6.3	0	18	15
32	Cash Jones	RB	2	44	22.0	1	36	4
15	Carson Beck	QB	7	43	6.1	0	20	6
23	De'Nylon Morrissette	WR	1	8	8.0	0	8	0.8
12	Brock Vandagriff	QB	1	7	7.0	0	7	2
10	Kearis Jackson	WR	1	−5	−5.0	0	−5	−0.3
	TOTALS		557	3080	5.5	44	75	205.3

Receiving statistics
#	NAME	POS	CTH	YDS	AVG	TD	LONG	AVG/G
19	Brock Bowers	TE	63	942	15.0	7	78	63
84	Ladd McConkey	WR	58	762	13.1	7	37	51
5	Adonai Mitchell	WR	4	65	16.3	1	27	65
10	Kearis Jackson	WR	3	45	15.0	0	23	45
19	Brock Bowers	TE	2	38	19.0	0	29	38
30	Daijun Edwards	RB	2	34	17.0	0	21	34
0	Darnell Washington	TE	2	33	16.5	0	25	33
2	Kendall Milton	RB	1	18	18.0	1	18	18
1	Marcus Rosemy-Jacksaint	WR	1	12	12.0	0	12	12
20	Sevaughn Clark	RB	1	4	4.0	0	4	4
	TOTALS		30	439	14.6	3	38	439

==== Defense ====
Defense statistics
#	NAME	POS	SOLO	AST	TOT	TFL-YDS	SACK-YDS	INT	BU	QBH	FR	FF	BLK	SAF	TD
–	–	–	–	–	–	–	–	–	–	–	–	–	–	–	–
	TOTAL		-	-	-	-	-	-	-	-	-	-	-	-	-

Key: POS: Position, SOLO: Solo Tackles, AST: Assisted Tackles, TOT: Total Tackles, TFL: Tackles-for-loss, SACK: Quarterback Sacks, INT: Interceptions, BU: Passes Broken Up, PD: Passes Defended, QBH: Quarterback Hits, FR: Fumbles Recovered, FF: Forced Fumbles, BLK: Kicks or Punts Blocked, SAF: Safeties, TD : Touchdown

==== Special teams ====
Kicking statistics
#	NAME	POS	XPM	XPA	XP%	FGM	FGA	FG%	1–19	20–29	30–39	40–49	50+	LNG
96	Jack Podlesny	PK	73	74	98.65%	26	31	83.87%	1/1	11/11	11/11	2/5	1/3	50
99	Jared Zirkel	PK		–	%	1	1	100.00%	0/0	1/1	0/0	0/0	0/0	21
	TOTALS		73	74	98.65%	27	32	84.38%	1/1	12/12	11/11	2/5	1/3	50

Kickoff statistics
#	NAME	POS	KICKS	YDS	AVG	TB	OB
–	–	–	–	–	–	–	–
	TOTALS		-	-	-	-	-

Punting statistics
#	NAME	POS	PUNTS	YDS	AVG	LONG	TB	I–20	50+	BLK
–	–	–	–	–	–	–	–	–	–	–
	TOTALS		-	-	-	-	-	-	-	-

Kick return statistics
#	NAME	POS	RTNS	YDS	AVG	TD	LNG
–	–	–	–	–	–	–	–
	TOTALS		-	-	-	-	-

Punt return statistics
#	NAME	POS	RTNS	YDS	AVG	TD	LONG
–	–	–	–	–	–	–	–
	TOTALS		-	-	-	-	-

=== Scoring ===
Georgia vs non-conference opponents

	1	2	3	4	Total
Georgia	35	59	33	31	158
Opponents	10	13	3	13	39

Georgia vs SEC opponents

	1	2	3	4	Total
Georgia	77	99	71	88	335
Opponents	13	34	43	31	121

Georgia vs all opponents

	1	2	3	4	Total
Georgia	112	158	104	119	493
Opponents	23	47	46	44	160

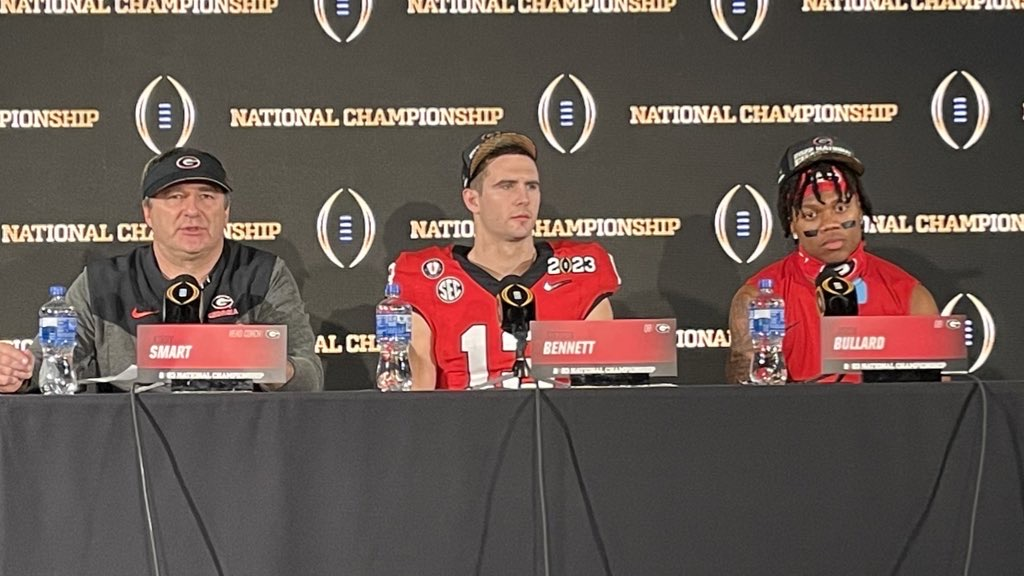

== After the season ==
=== Awards and SEC honors ===
Weekly honors
Recipient	Weekly award (SEC)	Week #	Date awarded	Ref.
Christopher Smith II, S	SEC Defensive Player of the Week	1	September 5, 2022	
Brock Bowers, TE	SEC Offensive Player of the Week	3	September 19, 2022	

Southeastern Conference individual awards
Recipient	Award	Date awarded	Ref.

Individual yearly awards
Recipient	Award	Date awarded	Ref.
Brock Bowers, TE	Mackey Award	December 9, 2022	

=== All-Americans ===
All-SEC
Player	Position	1st/2nd team
HM = Honorable mention. Source:

All-SEC Freshman
Player	Position
HM = Honorable mention. Source:

All-SEC Academic
Player	Position	Class	Major	Ref.
HM = Honorable mention. source:

NCAA recognized All-American Honors
Player	AP	AFCA	FWAA	TSN	WCFF	Designation
The NCAA recognizes a selection to all five of the AP, AFCA, FWAA, TSN and WCFF first teams for unanimous selections and three of five for consensus selections. HM = Honorable mention. source:

Other All-American honors
Player	Athletic	Athlon	BR	CBS Sports	CFN	ESPN	FOX Sports	Phil Steele	SI	USA Today

=== NFL draft ===
The NFL draft was held at Union Station in Kansas City, MO on April 27–29, 2023.

Bulldogs who were picked in the 2023 NFL Draft:

Round	Pick	Player	Position	NFL team
1	9	Jalen Carter	DT	Philadelphia Eagles
1	14	Broderick Jones	OT	Pittsburgh Steelers
1	30	Nolan Smith	LB	Philadelphia Eagles
3	93	Darnell Washington	TE	Pittsburgh Steelers
4	105	Kelee Ringo	CB	Philadelphia Eagles
4	128	Stetson Bennett	QB	Los Angeles Rams
5	170	Christopher Smith II	S	Las Vegas Raiders
5	173	Robert Beal Jr.	LB	San Francisco 49ers
5	174	Warren McClendon	OT	Los Angeles Rams
7	237	Kenny McIntosh	RB	Seattle Seahawks

==== NFL Draft combine ====
No members of the 2022 team were invited to participate in drills at the 2023 NFL scouting combine.

† Top performer

DNP = Did not participate
