= 2022 All-SEC football team =

American college football all-star team

The 2022 All-SEC football team consists of American football players selected to the All-Southeastern Conference (SEC) chosen by the Associated Press (AP) and the conference coaches for the 2022 Southeastern Conference football season.

Georgia won the conference, defeating LSU 50–30 in the SEC Championship.

Tennessee quarterback Hendon Hooker was voted the conference's Offensive Player of the Year (AP and Coaches). Alabama outside linebacker Will Anderson Jr. was voted the Defensive Player of the Year (AP and Coaches) for the second year in a row. Georgia placekicker Jack Podlesny was named the SEC Special Teams Player of the Year. Ole Miss running back Quinshon Judkins was voted SEC Newcomer/Freshman of the Year (AP and Coaches). Kirby Smart of Georgia was voted SEC Coach of the Year (AP and Coaches) for the third time.

== Offensive selections ==
=== Quarterbacks ===
- Hendon Hooker, Tennessee (AP-1, Coaches-1)
- Bryce Young, Alabama (AP-2)
- Stetson Bennett, Georgia (Coaches-2)

=== Running backs ===
- Quinshon Judkins, Ole Miss (AP-1, Coaches-1)
- De’Von Achane, Texas A&M (AP-2, Coaches-1)
- Raheim Sanders, Arkansas (AP-1, Coaches-2)
- Jahmyr Gibbs, Alabama (AP-2, Coaches-2)

=== Wide receivers ===
- Jalin Hyatt, Tennessee (AP-1, Coaches-1)
- Dominic Lovett, Missouri (AP-1, Coaches-2)
- Antwane Wells Jr., South Carolina (AP-2, Coaches-1)
- Ladd McConkey, Georgia (Coaches-2)
- Jonathan Mingo, Ole Miss (Coaches-2)
- Will Sheppard, Vanderbilt (AP-2)

=== Centers ===
- Ricky Stromberg, Arkansas (AP-1, Coaches-1)
- Sedrick Van Pran-Granger, Georgia (AP-2, Coaches-2)

=== Offensive line ===
- O'Cyrus Torrence, Florida (AP-1, Coaches-1)
- Darnell Wright, Tennessee (AP-1, Coaches-1)
- Emil Ekiyor Jr., Alabama (AP-1, Coaches-1)
- Warren McClendon, Georgia (Coaches-1)
- Broderick Jones, Georgia (AP-1)
- Nick Broeker, Ole Miss (Coaches-2)
- Javion Cohen, Alabama (Coaches-2)
- Tyler Steen, Alabama (Coaches-2)
- Jovaughn Gwyn, South Carolina (Coaches-2)
- Will Campbell, LSU (Coaches-2)
- Dalton Wagner, Arkansas (AP-2)
- Javon Foster, Missouri (AP-2)
- Beaux Limmer, Arkansas (AP-2)
- Ethan White, Florida (AP-2)

=== Tight ends ===
- Brock Bowers, Georgia (AP-1, Coaches-1)
- Darnell Washington, Georgia (AP-2, Coaches-2)

== Defensive selections ==
=== Defensive ends ===
- BJ Ojulari, LSU (AP-1, Coaches-1)
- Derick Hall, Auburn (AP-2, Coaches-1)
- Isaiah McGuire, Missouri (AP-1, Coaches-2)
- Byron Young, Tennessee (AP-2, Coaches-1)
- Tyrus Wheat, Mississippi State (Coaches-2)

=== Defensive tackles ===
- Jalen Carter, Georgia (AP-1, Coaches-1)
- Byron Young, Alabama (AP-2)
- Mekhi Wingo, LSU(AP-2, Coaches-2)
- Nazir Stackhouse, Georgia (Coaches-2)
- Deone Walker, Kentucky (AP-2)

=== Linebackers ===
- Will Anderson Jr., Alabama (AP-1, Coaches-1)
- Drew Sanders, Arkansas (AP-1, Coaches-1)
- Henry To'oTo'o, Alabama (Coaches-1)
- Harold Perkins, LSU, (AP-1, Coaches-2)
- Nathaniel Watson, Mississippi State (AP-2, Coaches-2)
- Bumper Pool, Arkansas (Coaches-2)
- Jamon Dumas-Johnson, Georgia (AP-2)
- Ty'Ron Hopper, Missouri (AP-2)

=== Defensive backs ===
- Emmanuel Forbes, Mississippi State (AP-1, Coaches-1)
- Kool-Aid McKinstry, Alabama (AP-1, Coaches-1)
- Christopher Smith II, Georgia (AP-1, Coaches-1)
- Antonio Johnson, Texas A&M (AP-1, Coaches-2)
- Jordan Battle, Alabama (AP-2, Coaches-1)
- Kelee Ringo, Georgia (AP-2, Coaches-2)
- Keidron Smith, Kentucky (Coaches-2)
- Dwight McGlothern, Arkansas (Coaches-2)
- D. J. James, Auburn (AP-2)
- Brian Branch, Alabama (AP-2)

== Special teams ==
=== Kickers ===
- Jack Podlesny, Georgia (AP-1, Coaches-1)
- Will Reichard, Alabama (AP-2, Coaches-2)

=== Punters ===
- Kai Kroeger, South Carolina (AP-1, Coaches-1)
- Nik Constantinou, Texas A&M (AP-2, Coaches-2)

=== All purpose/return specialist ===
- De’Von Achane, Texas A&M (Coaches-1)
- Lideatrick Griffin, Mississippi State (AP-1)
- Jahmyr Gibbs, Alabama (AP-2, Coaches-2)

== Key ==
Bold = Consensus first-team selection by both the coaches and AP

AP = Associated Press

Coaches = Selected by the SEC coaches

== See also ==
- 2022 Southeastern Conference football season
- 2022 College Football All-America Team
- Southeastern Conference football individual awards
