= 2022 SEC Championship Game =

- Conference Championship
| LSU Tigers | Georgia Bulldogs |
| (9–3) | (12–0) |
| 30 | 50 |
| Head coach: Brian Kelly | Head coach: Kirby Smart |
| AP / Coaches / CFP; 11 / 13 / 14 | AP / Coaches / CFP; 1 / 1 / 1 |
| | 1 | 2 | 3 | 4 | Total |
|---|---|---|---|---|---|
| LSU | 7 | 3 | 13 | 7 | 30 |
| Georgia | 14 | 21 | 7 | 8 | 50 |
- Date: December 3, 2022
- Season: 2022
- Stadium: Mercedes-Benz Stadium
- Location: Atlanta, Georgia
- MVP: Stetson Bennett, QB, Georgia
- Favorite: Georgia by 17.5
- Referee: David Smith
- Attendance: 74,810

United States TV coverage
- Network: CBS, Westwood One, SEC Radio
- Announcers: Brad Nessler (play-by-play), Gary Danielson (color), Jenny Dell (sideline) (CBS); Mike Watts, Derek Rackley and Olivia Dekker (Westwood One); Dave Neal, David Archer and Stephen Hartzell (SEC Radio)

2022 Southeastern Conference football standings
| | Conf. | | | Overall |
| Team | W | | L | W | | L |
|---|---|---|---|---|---|---|
Eastern Division
| No. 1 Georgia xy$#^ | 8 | – | 0 | 15 | – | 0 |
| No. 6 Tennessee | 6 | – | 2 | 11 | – | 2 |
| No. 23 South Carolina | 4 | – | 4 | 8 | – | 5 |
| Kentucky | 3 | – | 5 | 7 | – | 6 |
| Florida | 3 | – | 5 | 6 | – | 7 |
| Missouri | 3 | – | 5 | 6 | – | 7 |
| Vanderbilt | 2 | – | 6 | 5 | – | 7 |
Western Division
| No. 16 LSU xy | 6 | – | 2 | 10 | – | 4 |
| No. 5 Alabama x | 6 | – | 2 | 11 | – | 2 |
| No. 20 Mississippi State | 4 | – | 4 | 9 | – | 4 |
| Ole Miss | 4 | – | 4 | 8 | – | 5 |
| Arkansas | 3 | – | 5 | 7 | – | 6 |
| Auburn | 2 | – | 6 | 5 | – | 7 |
| Texas A&M | 2 | – | 6 | 5 | – | 7 |
Championship: Georgia 50, LSU 30
# – College Football Playoff champion; ^ – College Football Playoff participant; $ – Conference champion; x – Division champion/co-champions; y – Championship game participant; Rankings from AP Poll

The 2022 SEC Championship Game was a college football game played on December 3, 2022, at Mercedes-Benz Stadium in Atlanta. It was the 31st edition of the SEC Championship Game and determined the champion of the Southeastern Conference (SEC) for the 2022 season. The game began at 4:00 p.m. EST on CBS. The contest featured the LSU Tigers, the West Division champions and the Georgia Bulldogs of the East Division.

== Teams ==
=== LSU Tigers ===
The Tigers clinched a spot in the game following Alabama's defeat of Ole Miss on November 12. Earlier in the season, LSU had defeated both Alabama and Ole Miss. LSU's last appearance, and victory, in the game was in 2019.

=== Georgia Bulldogs ===
Georgia began the season as the No. 3 ranked team in both the AP and Coaches Polls. In the Chick-Fil-A Kickoff Game, Georgia defeated No. 11 Oregon 49–3. The following week, after jumping to No. 2 in both polls, Georgia defeated No. 25-FCS-ranked Samford 33–0. Georgia would jump to No. 1 in the AP Poll before defeating South Carolina 48–7 on the road. Georgia would return to Athens as the No. 1 team in both polls. Georgia would go on to defeat Kent State 39–22. The following week at Missouri, Georgia would trail 22–12 in the fourth quarter. After 14 unanswered points, Georgia would win the game 26–22. Georgia would return home for a two-game home stretch including victories over rivals Auburn and Vanderbilt before a bye week. Following the bye week, Georgia would defeat Florida 42–20. During the game, Nolan Smith would tear a pectoral muscle, prematurely ending his season. Georgia would remain No. 1 in the AP and Coaches Polls but was ranked No. 3 in the inaugural College Football Playoff rankings. In the game of the century, Georgia defeated Tennessee 27–13. The following week, Georgia clinched a spot in the SEC Championship with a 45–19 victory over Mississippi State.

== Game summary ==
2022 SEC Championship Game

| Quarter | 1 | 2 | 3 | 4 | Total |
|---|---|---|---|---|---|
| No. 14 Tigers | 7 | 3 | 13 | 7 | 30 |
| No. 1 Bulldogs | 14 | 21 | 7 | 8 | 50 |

at Mercedes-Benz Stadium • Atlanta, Georgia

- Date: December 3, 2022
- Game time: 4:00 p.m. EST
- Game weather: Indoor
- Referee: David Smith
- TV announcers (CBS): Brad Nessler (play-by-play), Gary Danielson (analyst), Jenny Dell (sideline)

Game information

First quarter

- (3:33) UGA – Damian Ramos 32 yd FG BLOCKED by Nazir Stackhouse, Christopher Smith return for 95 yds for a TD (Jack Podlesny Kick) (Georgia 7–0)
- (2:21) LSU – Kayshon Boutte 53 yd pass from Jayden Daniels (Damian Ramos Kick) (Tied 7–7)
- (0:03) UGA – Brock Bowers 4 yd pass from Stetson Bennett (Jack Podlesny Kick) (Georgia 14–7)

Second quarter

- (14:43) UGA – Ladd McConkey 22 yd pass from Stetson Bennett (Jack Podlesny Kick) (Georgia 21–7)
- (2:48) UGA – Darnell Washington 14 yd pass from Stetson Bennett (Jack Podlesny Kick) (Georgia 28–7)
- (0:32) UGA – Dillon Bell 3 yd pass from Stetson Bennett (Jack Podlesny Kick) (Georgia 35–7)
- (0:01) LSU – Damian Ramos 42 yd Field Goal (Georgia 35–10)

Third quarter

- (10:33) LSU – Malik Nabers 34 yd pass from Garrett Nussmeier (Damian Ramos Kick) (Georgia 35–17)
- (3:32) UGA – Kenny McIntosh 2 yd Run (Jack Podlesny Kick) (Georgia 42–17)
- (1:46) LSU – Noah Cain 1 yd Run (2-PT Pass Conversion Failed) (Georgia 42–23)

Fourth quarter

- (13:13) UGA – Kenny McIntosh 8 yd Run (Adonai Mitchell pass to Darnell Washington for 2-PT Conversion) (Georgia 50–23)
- (7:12) LSU – Jaray Jenkins 33 yd pass from Garrett Nussmeier (Damian Ramos Kick) (Georgia 50–30)
