= Amarius Mims =

American football player (born 2002)

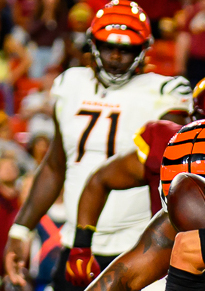
- Mims with the Cincinnati Bengals in 2025

No. 71 – Cincinnati Bengals
- Position: Offensive tackle
- Roster status: Active

Personal information
- Born: October 14, 2002 (age 24); Cochran, Georgia, U.S.
- Listed height: 6 ft 8 in (2.03 m)
- Listed weight: 350 lb (159 kg)

Career information
- High school: Bleckley County (Cochran)
- College: Georgia (2021–2023)
- NFL draft: 2024: 1st round, 18th overall pick

Career history
- Cincinnati Bengals (2024–present)

Awards and highlights
- 2× CFP national champion (2021, 2022)

Career NFL statistics as of 2025
- Games played: 32
- Games started: 30
- Stats at Pro Football Reference

Amarius Tyron Mims (born October 14, 2002) is an American professional football offensive tackle for the Cincinnati Bengals of the National Football League (NFL). He played college football for the Georgia Bulldogs, where he won consecutive national championships in 2021 and 2022. Mims was selected by the Bengals in the first round of the 2024 NFL draft.

== Early life ==
Mims was born on October 14, 2002, in Cochran, Georgia. He played football at Bleckley County High School and was rated a five-star recruit before committing to play college football for the Georgia Bulldogs.

== College career ==
Mims played in seven games as a freshman with the Bulldogs. After the season, He entered the NCAA transfer portal, but ultimately decided to return to Georgia for his sophomore season. Mims played in the first 12 games of his sophomore season as a reserve. Following an injury to starting right tackle Warren McClendon, he started in the 2022 Peach Bowl and the national championship. Mims declared for the 2024 NFL draft following the 2023 season. While he was playing at Georgia, Mims was injured and required treatment at Piedmont Hospital in Atlanta that was featured locally in the Atlanta area.

== Professional career ==
Pre-draft measurables
Height	Weight	Arm length	Hand span	Wingspan	40-yard dash	10-yard split	20-yard split	Vertical jump	Broad jump	Bench press
6 ft 7 3/4 in (2.03 m)	340 lb (154 kg)	36 1/8 in (0.92 m)	11 1/4 in (0.29 m)	7 ft 2 3/4 in (2.20 m)	5.07 s	1.78 s	2.95 s	25.5 in (0.65 m)	9 ft 3 in (2.82 m)	22 reps
All values from NFL Combine/Pro Day

Mims was selected by the Cincinnati Bengals in the first round with the 18th overall pick in the 2024 NFL draft. He made his NFL debut in week 3. He appeared in 15 games and started 13 in the 2024 season.
