= Gluckstadt, Mississippi =

- City
- Nickname: Lucky City
- Location within Mississippi Location within the United States
- Coordinates: 32°31′50″N 90°06′11″W
- Country: United States
- State: Mississippi
- County: Madison

Government
  - Mayor: Walter C. Morrison IV
  - City Clerk: Lindsay Kellum

Area
  - Total: 8.98 sq mi (23.3 km^{2})
  - Land: 8.78 sq mi (22.7 km^{2})
  - Water: 0.20 sq mi (0.52 km^{2})
- Elevation: 279 ft (85 m)

Population (2020)
  - Total: 3,208
- Time zone: UTC-6 (Central (CST))
  - Summer (DST): UTC-5 (CDT)
- ZIP codes: 39110 (Madison); 39046 (Canton)
- Area codes: 601, 769
- GNIS feature ID: 2831207
- FIPS Code: 28-27900
- Website: www.gluckstadtms.org

Gluckstadt is a city in Madison County, Mississippi, United States. It was a census-designated place and unincorporated community until the municipal incorporation of the City of Gluckstadt became effective in June 2021. As of the 2020 census, prior to incorporation, the Gluckstadt CDP had a population of 3,208. The city is located along Interstate 55 in south-central Madison County, between the cities of Madison and Canton. It is part of the Jackson metropolitan area.

== History ==
Gluckstadt was established in June 1905 by several German Catholic families from Klaasville, Lake County, Indiana. The community's name translated into English means "Lucky Town". There is also a town in Germany that has the name Glückstadt. Each year, a German festival is held in Gluckstadt on the grounds of St. Joseph Catholic Church.

In 1964 civil rights workers ran a freedom school in the community. It was firebombed and burned, but the school continued to meet in the ashes of its former location. In the fall of 1964 some of the people who had attended the freedom school in Gluckstadt moved to the one in Canton.

On January 31, 2017, the required two-thirds of qualified electors in the area to be incorporated filed for the incorporation of Gluckstadt. Subsequently, the neighboring city of Canton filed an annexation petition that included some of the territory covered by the incorporation petition of Gluckstadt, putting the incorporation on hold as it worked it way through the courts. In 2021, the Mississippi Supreme Court ruled that Gluckstadt could incorporate into Mississippi's newest city. The new city was initially represented by Mayor Walter Morrison IV and Aldermen Jayce Powell, Lisa Williams, John Taylor, Miya Warfield Bates and Wesley Slay, who were appointed by the Secretary of State of Mississippi. Gluckstadt held its first municipal general election in 2025.

== Geography ==
Gluckstadt is 8 miles (13 km) south of Canton, 5 miles (8 km) north of Madison, and 17 miles (27 km) north of downtown Jackson, the state capital. Interstate 55 passes through the center of Gluckstadt, with access from Exit 112 (Gluckstadt Road). U.S. Route 51 passes through the east side of Gluckstadt, providing a direct route to the centers of Madison and Canton.

According to the U.S. Census Bureau, the city of Gluckstadt has a total area of 9.0 square miles (23.3 km^{2}), of which 8.8 square miles (22.8 km^{2}) are land and 0.2 square miles (0.5 km^{2}), or 2.20%, are water. The city is drained by Bear Creek and its tributaries. Bear Creek flows northeast, then northwest to the Big Black River at the Yazoo County border.

== Demographics ==
Historical population
Census	Pop.	Note	%±
2020	3,208		—
U.S. Decennial Census

Gluckstadt was first listed as a census designated place in the 2020 U.S. census.

=== 2020 census ===
Gluckstadt CDP, Mississippi – Racial and ethnic composition Note: the US Census treats Hispanic/Latino as an ethnic category. This table excludes Latinos from the racial categories and assigns them to a separate category. Hispanics/Latinos may be of any race.
Race / Ethnicity (NH = Non-Hispanic)	Pop 2020	2020
White alone (NH)	1,889	58.88%
Black or African American alone (NH)	1,009	31.45%
Native American or Alaska Native alone (NH)	4	0.12%
Asian alone (NH)	121	3.77%
Native Hawaiian or Pacific Islander alone (NH)	0	0.00%
Other race alone (NH)	15	0.47%
Mixed race or Multiracial (NH)	96	2.99%
Hispanic or Latino (any race)	74	2.31%
Total	3,208	100.00%

As of the 2020 United States Census, there were 3,208 people.

== Education ==
Public education for most of the city is provided by the Madison County School District.

The city is served by two elementary schools (grades K-5): Madison Crossing and Mannsdale, by Germantown Middle School (grades 6–8), and by Germantown High School (grades 9–12). In 2009, Madison County School District granted Gluckstadt a high school when Madison Central became overcrowded. Before the establishment of Germantown High, Madison Crossing Elementary, Mannsdale Elementary, and Germantown Middle were feeder schools to Madison Central.

A section of the city is part of the Canton School District.

== Subdivisions ==
Gluckstadt has 50 subdivisions: 25 for Mannsdale Elementary and 25 for Madison Crossing Elementary.

== Government ==
In 2021, Walter C. Morrison IV became Gluckstadt's first mayor. Lindsay Kellum was hired as City Clerk, the first employee hired for the new municipality.

== Notable people ==
- Branson Robinson, running back for the University of Georgia Bulldogs
- Aaron Shirley, physician and MacArthur Fellow
- Madison Booker, Basketball Player for the University of Texas Longhorns
