= Chris Smith II =

American football player (born 2000)

Profile
- Position: Safety

Personal information
- Born: May 1, 2000 (age 26); Atlanta, Georgia, U.S.
- Listed height: 5 ft 10 in (1.78 m)
- Listed weight: 197 lb (89 kg)

Career information
- High school: Hapeville Charter (Union City, Georgia)
- College: Georgia (2018–2022)
- NFL draft: 2023: 5th round, 170th overall pick

Career history
- Las Vegas Raiders (2023–2025); Los Angeles Rams (2025); New York Jets (2025)

Awards and highlights
- 2× CFP national champion (2021, 2022); Unanimous All-American (2022); First-team All-SEC (2022)

Career NFL statistics as of 2025
- Total tackles: 10
- Stats at Pro Football Reference

Christopher Paul Smith II (born May 1, 2000) is an American professional football safety. He played college football for the Georgia Bulldogs, earning unanimous All-American honors in 2022 and winning two CFP national championships.

== Early life ==
Smith attended Hapeville Charter Career Academy in Union City, Georgia. As a senior, Smith recorded five interceptions and seven pass break-ups with 54 tackles. As a three-star recruit, Smith chose to play college football at the University of Georgia, following teammate William Poole.

== College career ==
Smith played sparingly in his first two seasons at Georgia. Smith would play in all ten games in 2020, and he would increase his production after starter Richard LeCounte got into a motorcycle accident in 2020. In 2021, Smith would become the full time starter. In week one against Clemson, Smith intercepted Clemson quarterback DJ Uiagalelei, and returned it 74 yards for the only touchdown of the game, which resulted in a 10–3 Georgia victory. Over the course of the season, Smith played in 12 games amassing 34 tackles, and recording three interceptions. In the 2022 College Football Playoff National Championship Game, Smith would tally one interception and a career high seven tackles in Georgia's win. Shortly after the game, Smith announced he would return to Georgia using the extra year of eligibility given by the NCAA because of the shortened 2020 season due to the COVID-19 pandemic. In his final season at Georgia, Smith recorded 50 tackles and three interceptions, while being named a unanimous All-American alongside former teammate Jalen Carter. During the 2022 SEC Championship Game, after Nazir Stackhouse blocked a 33-yard field goal attempt, Smith returned the blocked kick 95-yards for a touchdown. Georgia would go on to win the game 50–30, before winning their second National Championship in consecutive years, by a score of 65–7. At the season's end, Smith announced that he would enter the 2023 NFL draft.

== Professional career ==
Pre-draft measurables
Height	Weight	Arm length	Hand span	Wingspan	40-yard dash	10-yard split	20-yard split	20-yard shuttle	Three-cone drill	Vertical jump	Broad jump	Bench press
5 ft 10 5/8 in (1.79 m)	192 lb (87 kg)	31 1/8 in (0.79 m)	9 5/8 in (0.24 m)	6 ft 3 in (1.91 m)	4.62 s	1.56 s	2.62 s	4.41 s	7.45 s	33.0 in (0.84 m)	9 ft 8 in (2.95 m)	15 reps
All values from NFL Combine/Pro Day

=== Las Vegas Raiders ===
Smith was selected by the Las Vegas Raiders in the fifth round with the 170th overall pick in the 2023 NFL draft.

On November 18, 2025, Smith was waived by the Raiders.

=== Los Angeles Rams ===
On November 19, 2025, Smith was claimed off waivers by the Los Angeles Rams. He was waived on December 23.

=== New York Jets ===
On December 24, 2025, Smith was claimed off waivers by the New York Jets. On May 7, 2026, Smith was waived by the Jets.

== NFL career statistics ==
Legend
**Bold**	Career high

=== Regular season ===
Year	Team	Games		Tackles					Interceptions						Fumbles				
Year	Team	GP	GS	Cmb	Solo	Ast	Sck	TFL	Int	Yds	Avg	Lng	TD	PD	FF	Fum	FR	Yds	TD
2023	LV	12	0	1	1	0	0.0	0	0	0	0.0	0	0	0	0	0	0	0	0
2024	LV	**15**	0	**6**	**2**	**4**	0.0	0	0	0	0.0	0	0	0	0	0	0	0	0
2025	LV	9	0	3	1	2	0.0	0	0	0	0.0	0	0	0	0	0	0	0	0
2025	LAR	4	0	0	0	0	0.0	0	0	0	0.0	0	0	0	0	0	0	0	0
2025	NYJ	1	0	0	0	0	0.0	0	0	0	0.0	0	0	0	0	0	0	0	0
Career		41	0	10	4	6	0.0	0	0	0	0.0	0	0	0	0	0	0	0	0
