= Kenny McIntosh =

American football player (born 2000)

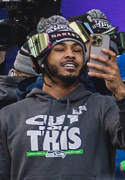
- McIntosh in 2026

Profile
- Position: Running back

Personal information
- Born: March 3, 2000 (age 26); Fort Lauderdale, Florida, U.S.
- Listed height: 6 ft 0 in (1.83 m)
- Listed weight: 204 lb (93 kg)

Career information
- High school: University School (Davie, Florida)
- College: Georgia (2019–2022)
- NFL draft: 2023: 7th round, 237th overall pick

Career history
- Seattle Seahawks (2023–2025)

Awards and highlights
- Super Bowl champion (LX); 2× CFP national champion (2021, 2022)

Career NFL statistics as of 2025
- Rushing yards: 172
- Rushing average: 5.5
- Receptions: 3
- Receiving yards: 22
- Stats at Pro Football Reference

Kenneth McIntosh (born March 3, 2000) is an American professional football running back. He played college football for the Georgia Bulldogs.

== Early life ==
Kenny McIntosh grew up in Fort Lauderdale, Florida, and attended University School in nearby Davie. His older brothers are collegiate running back Deon McIntosh—who played at Notre Dame and Washington State—and NFL defensive end R. J. McIntosh.

== College career ==
At the University of Georgia, McIntosh saw limited playing time as a freshman during the Bulldogs' 2019 season, garnering 174 yards and 2 touchdowns on 25 carries while playing behind fellow running backs D'Andre Swift, Brian Herrien, Zamir White, and James Cook. As a sophomore in the shortened 2020 season, McIntosh rushed for 251 yards (third most behind White and Cook) and 1 touchdown on 47 carries (second most behind White). In 13 games as a junior in 2021 (including the Southeastern Conference Championship and Georgia's two playoff games), McIntosh ran for 328 yards and 3 touchdowns on 58 carries (third most behind White and Cook), adding another 242 yards receiving and 2 touchdown catches.

On December 31, 2021, in the first quarter of the Orange Bowl against Michigan (first round of the College Football Playoff (CFP)), Georgia ran a trick play in which McIntosh took a handoff from quarterback Stetson Bennett, rolled to the right, and completed an 18-yard touchdown pass to receiver Adonai Mitchell, putting Georgia up 14–0. The Bulldogs later won 34–11 and advanced to the 2022 CFP National Championship. In the national championship, McIntosh rushed 2 times for 6 yards and caught 3 passes for 23 yards in the 33–18 win over Alabama.

== Professional career ==
Pre-draft measurables
Height	Weight	Arm length	Hand span	Wingspan	40-yard dash	10-yard split	20-yard split	20-yard shuttle	Three-cone drill	Vertical jump	Broad jump
6 ft 0 1/4 in (1.84 m)	204 lb (93 kg)	30 1/2 in (0.77 m)	9 in (0.23 m)	6 ft 4 3/8 in (1.94 m)	4.62 s	1.54 s	2.60 s	4.69 s	7.69 s	32.5 in (0.83 m)	9 ft 5 in (2.87 m)
All values from NFL Combine/Pro Day

McIntosh was drafted by the Seattle Seahawks in the seventh round (237th overall) of the 2023 NFL draft. He was placed on injured reserve on September 9, 2023. He was activated on November 11.

On July 28, 2025, the Seahawks placed McIntosh on injured reserve after he suffered a torn ACL in training camp. The Seahawks would go on to win Super Bowl LX over the New England Patriots that season, though McIntosh would not play in any game as a result of the injury.

On July 27, 2026, McIntosh was waived by the Seahawks.

== Career statistics ==
College statistics
Year	Team	Games	Rushing				Receiving				Kick returns			
Year	Team	GP	Att	Yards	Avg	TD	Rec	Yards	Avg	TD	Ret	Yards	Avg	TD
2019	Georgia	12	25	174	7.0	2	1	3	3.0	0	0	0	0	0
2020	Georgia	8	47	251	5.3	1	10	111	11.1	0	6	218	36.3	0
2021	Georgia	14	58	328	5.7	3	22	242	11.0	2	8	157	19.6	0
2022	Georgia	15	150	829	5.5	10	43	505	11.7	2	0	0	0.0	0
Career		43	280	1,582	5.7	16	76	861	11.5	4	14	375	26.8	0
