= Jack Podlesny =

American football player (born 2000)

Profile
- Position: Placekicker

Personal information
- Born: March 16, 2000 (age 26); St. Simons Island, Georgia, U.S.
- Listed height: 6 ft 0 in (1.83 m)
- Listed weight: 195 lb (88 kg)

Career information
- High school: Glynn Academy (Brunswick, Georgia)
- College: Georgia (2018–2022)
- NFL draft: 2023: undrafted

Career history
- Minnesota Vikings (2023)*; Green Bay Packers (2024)*
- * Offseason or practice squad member only

Awards and highlights
- 2× CFP national champion (2021, 2022); NCAA scoring leader (2022); SEC Special Teams Player of the Year (2022); First-team All-SEC (2022)
- Stats at Pro Football Reference

Jack Morgan Podlesny (born March 16, 2000) is an American football placekicker. He played college football for the Georgia Bulldogs. Nicknamed "Hot Pod", he was named the SEC Special Teams Player of the Year in 2022.

== Early life ==
Podlesny attended Glynn Academy in Brunswick, Georgia. In his senior year, Podlesny converted on nine of his ten field goal tries, while making 49 of his 51 point-after-tries. Despite offers from schools such as Georgia Tech, North Carolina, and Michigan, Podlesny walked on at the University of Georgia.

== College career ==
In 2018, Podlesny redshirted, and the following year, he was the backup to Rodrigo Blankenship. In 2020, Podlesny became Georgia's starting kicker. During the season, Podlesny made 13 field goals out of 16 attempts, while making all of his 38 point-after-tries. As a result, Podlesny was named a semi-finalist for the Lou Groza Award. During the 2021 Peach Bowl, Podlesny hit a career-long 53-yard go-ahead field goal with 0:03 seconds remaining. The kick was the longest field goal in Peach Bowl history and Podlesny was named the game's MVP for his efforts. After the game, Podlesny was awarded a scholarship. In 2021, Podlesny went 22 of 27 on field goal attempts. During the 2022 College Football Playoff National Championship, Podlesny recorded two field goals including a season-high 49-yard field goal in a 33–18 victory. During Podlesny's redshirt senior season, he converted 23 out of 26 field goals, being named the SEC Special Teams Player of the Year and the All-SEC First-Team.

After Georgia won the 2023 College Football Playoff National Championship, Podlesny played in the 2023 Hula Bowl. He led the NCAA in scoring for the season with 151 points.

=== College statistics ===
Legend
	Led the NCAA
**Bold**	Career high

Year	Team	Kicking							
Year	Team	GP	XPM	XPA	XP%	FGM	FGA	FG%	Pts
2020	Georgia	10	38	38	**100.0**	13	16	81.3	77
2021	Georgia	15	71	72	98.6	21	26	80.8	134
2022	Georgia	15	**73**	**74**	98.6	**26**	**31**	**83.9**	**151**
**Career**		**40**	**182**	**184**	**98.9**	**60**	**73**	**82.2**	**362**

== Professional career ==
Pre-draft measurables
Height	Weight	Arm length	Hand span
6 ft 0 3/8 in (1.84 m)	194 lb (88 kg)	29 5/8 in (0.75 m)	9 1/8 in (0.23 m)
All values from NFL Combine

=== Minnesota Vikings ===
Podlesny signed with the Minnesota Vikings as an undrafted free agent on April 29, 2023. On August 17, 2023, Podlesny was waived by the Vikings.

=== Green Bay Packers ===
On January 24, 2024, Podlesny signed with the Green Bay Packers. On June 19, 2024, Podlesny was released by the Packers.

== Personal life ==
Podlesny is a Christian.
