= Marvin Jones Jr. (linebacker) =

American football player (born 2004)

Dallas Renegades
- Position: Outside linebacker
- Roster status: Unsigned draft pick

Personal information
- Born: June 8, 2004 (age 22); Sunrise, Florida
- Listed height: 6 ft 5 in (1.96 m)
- Listed weight: 245 lb (111 kg)

Career information
- High school: American Heritage Schools (Plantation, Florida)
- College: Georgia (2022–2023); Florida State (2024); Oklahoma (2025)
- NFL draft: 2026: undrafted

Career history
- Seattle Seahawks (2026)*; Washington Commanders (2026)*; Dallas Renegades (2027-present)
- * Offseason or practice squad member only

Awards and highlights
- CFP national champion (2022)
- Stats at Pro Football Reference

Marvin Maurice Jones Jr. (born June 8, 2004) is an American professional football outside linebacker. He played college football for the Florida State Seminoles, Georgia Bulldogs, and Oklahoma Sooners.

== Early life ==
Jones Jr. attended American Heritage Schools in Plantation, Florida. In his final two seasons, he had 101 tackles and 18 sacks. He was rated as a five-star recruit by 247Sports and committed to play college football for the Georgia Bulldogs over offers from other schools such as Alabama, USC, Florida State, Texas A&M, and Oklahoma.

== College career ==
=== Georgia ===
In two years at Georgia in 2022 and 2023, Jones Jr. totaled 16 tackles with five and a half being for a loss, two sacks, a fumble recovery, and a forced fumble in 25 games played, winning back-to-back national championships. After the 2023 season, he entered the NCAA transfer portal.

=== Florida State ===
Jones Jr. transferred to play for the Florida State Seminoles. During his lone season as a Seminole in 2024, he notched 25 tackles with six going for a loss, four sacks, and a forced fumble. After the conclusion of the season, Jones Jr. once again entered the NCAA transfer portal.

=== Oklahoma ===
Jones Jr. transferred to play for the Oklahoma Sooners. He finished the 2025 season with 21 tackles including five for a loss and two sacks.

== Professional career ==
Pre-draft measurables
Height	Weight	Arm length	Hand span	Wingspan	40-yard dash	10-yard split	20-yard split	20-yard shuttle	Three-cone drill	Vertical jump
6 ft 5 in (1.96 m)	245 lb (111 kg)	33 1/8 in (0.84 m)	9 1/4 in (0.23 m)	6 ft 8 7/8 in (2.05 m)	4.69 s	1.65 s	2.73 s	4.42 s	7.44 s	34.5 in (0.88 m)
All values from NFL Combine/Pro Day

=== Seattle Seahawks ===
After not being selected in the 2026 NFL draft, Jones Jr. signed with the Seattle Seahawks as an undrafted free agent. He was waived by the Seahawks on August 30 as a part of final roster cuts, and re-signed a day later to the practice squad. Jones was released from the practice squad on September 5.

=== Washington Commanders ===
On September 16, 2026, the Washington Commanders signed Jones to their practice squad. On September 29, he was placed on practice squad injured list, and released shortly after.

== Personal life ==
Jones Jr. is the son of former NFL linebacker, Marvin Jones.
