= Julian Humphrey =

American football player (born 2003)

No. 6 – Texas A&M Aggies
- Position: Cornerback
- Class: Redshirt Senior

Personal information
- Born: December 20, 2003 (age 22)
- Listed height: 6 ft 1 in (1.85 m)
- Listed weight: 195 lb (88 kg)

Career information
- High school: Clear Lake (Houston, Texas)
- College: Georgia (2022–2024); Texas A&M (2025–present)
- Stats at ESPN

Julian Humphrey (born December 20, 2003) is an American college football cornerback for the Texas A&M Aggies. He previously played for the Georgia Bulldogs.

== Early life ==
Humphrey attended Clear Lake High School in Houston, Texas. He was rated as a four-star recruit and committed to play college football for the Florida Gators over offers from schools such as Georgia, LSU, and Texas A&M. Humphrey later flipped his commitment to play for the Georgia Bulldogs.

== College career ==
=== Georgia ===
In three seasons with the Bulldogs from 2022 through 2024, Humphrey appeared in 23 games where he became a full-time starter in 2024, totaling 21 tackles and five pass deflections, while also winning a National Championship with Georgia during the 2022 season. However after starting the first ten games of the 2024 season, Humphrey entered his name into the NCAA transfer portal, after he was benched in favor for Daniel Harris.

=== Texas A&M ===
On December 15, 2024, Humphrey announced that he would transfer to Texas A&M.
