= Warren McClendon =

American football player (born 2001)

No. 71 – Los Angeles Rams
- Position: Offensive tackle
- Roster status: Active

Personal information
- Born: April 11, 2001 (age 25); Brunswick, Georgia, U.S.
- Listed height: 6 ft 4 in (1.93 m)
- Listed weight: 315 lb (143 kg)

Career information
- High school: Brunswick (GA)
- College: Georgia (2019–2022)
- NFL draft: 2023: 5th round, 174th overall pick

Career history
- Los Angeles Rams (2023–present)

Awards and highlights
- 2× CFP national champion (2021, 2022); First-team All-SEC (2022)

Career NFL statistics as of Week 1, 2026
- Games played: 37
- Games started: 16
- Stats at Pro Football Reference

Warren Christopher McClendon Jr. (born April 11, 2001) is an American professional football offensive tackle for the Los Angeles Rams of the National Football League (NFL). He played college football for the Georgia Bulldogs.

== Early life ==
McClendon grew up in Brunswick, Georgia. He attended Frederica Academy in middle school and then Brunswick High School. He was rated a four-star recruit and committed to play college football at Georgia.

== College career ==
McClendon played during his true freshman season before redshirting the year. As a redshirt freshman, he started nine of Georgia's ten games and was named a Freshman All-American by the Football Writers Association of America. McClendon started all 15 of Georgia's games at right tackle as the Bulldogs won the 2022 College Football Playoff National Championship. He was named first team All-Southeastern Conference (SEC) as a redshirt junior. McClendon suffered a knee injury in the 2022 SEC Championship Game and missed the 2022 Peach Bowl.

== Professional career ==
Pre-draft measurables
Height	Weight	Arm length	Hand span	Wingspan	Bench press
6 ft 4 1/8 in (1.93 m)	306 lb (139 kg)	34 1/2 in (0.88 m)	10 in (0.25 m)	6 ft 10 3/4 in (2.10 m)	20 reps
All values from NFL Combine/Pro Day

McClendon was selected by the Los Angeles Rams in the fifth round, 174th overall, of the 2023 NFL draft. As a rookie, he appeared in six games in the 2023 season.

== Personal life ==
McClendon's uncle, Willie McClendon, played running back at Georgia and in the NFL for the Chicago Bears. His cousin, Bryan McClendon, also played at Georgia and for the Bears and is currently the Tampa Bay Buccaneers wide receivers coach. He was previously the Bulldogs' passing game coordinator and wide receivers coach.
