= Branson Robinson =

American football player (born 2004)

No. 22 – Georgia State Panthers
- Position: Running back
- Class: Redshirt Junior

Personal information
- Born: March 17, 2004 (age 22); Canton, Mississippi, U.S.
- Listed height: 5 ft 11 in (1.80 m)
- Listed weight: 211 lb (96 kg)

Career information
- High school: Germantown (Gluckstadt, Mississippi)
- College: Georgia (2022–2024); Georgia State (2025–present)

Awards and highlights
- CFP national champion (2022)
- Stats at ESPN

Branson Robinson (born March 17, 2004) is an American college football running back for the Georgia State Panthers of the Sun Belt Conference (SBC). He previously played for the Georgia Bulldogs.

== Career ==
Robinson attended Germantown High School in Gluckstadt, Mississippi. A five-star recruit, he played in the 2022 Under Armour All-American Game. Robinson committed to the University of Georgia to play college football.

As a true freshman at Georgia in 2022, Robinson was a backup running back. He was named the SEC freshman of the week after rushing for 98 yards and a touchdown against Auburn.

In April 2025, Robinson entered the NCAA transfer portal. He transferred to Georgia State prior to the beginning of the 2025 season.
