= Sedrick Van Pran-Granger =

American football player (born 2001)

No. 63 – Indianapolis Colts
- Position: Center
- Roster status: Active

Personal information
- Born: October 23, 2001 (age 25); New Orleans, Louisiana, U.S.
- Listed height: 6 ft 4 in (1.93 m)
- Listed weight: 315 lb (143 kg)

Career information
- High school: Warren Easton (New Orleans)
- College: Georgia (2020–2023)
- NFL draft: 2024: 5th round, 141st overall pick

Career history
- Buffalo Bills (2024–2025); Indianapolis Colts (2026–present)

Awards and highlights
- 2× CFP national champion (2021, 2022); Jacobs Blocking Trophy (2023); First-team All-SEC (2023); Second-team All-SEC (2022)

Career NFL statistics as of 2025
- Games played: 31
- Games started: 2
- Stats at Pro Football Reference

Sedrick Sentel Van Pran-Granger (born October 23, 2001) is an American professional football center for the Indianapolis Colts of the National Football League (NFL). He played college football for the Georgia Bulldogs, winning two national championships.

== Early life and college ==
Van Pran-Granger attended Warren Easton Charter High School in New Orleans, Louisiana. He was a four-year starter at center in high school. He committed to the University of Georgia to play college football.

After spending his true freshman year in 2020 as a backup, Van Pran-Granger started all 15 games at center in 2021. He was part of the team that defeated Alabama in the National Championship. He returned to Georgia as the starter in 2022.

== Professional career ==
Pre-draft measurables
Height	Weight	Arm length	Hand span	Wingspan	40-yard dash	10-yard split	20-yard split	20-yard shuttle	Three-cone drill	Bench press
6 ft 4 1/8 in (1.93 m)	298 lb (135 kg)	31 3/8 in (0.80 m)	9 1/2 in (0.24 m)	6 ft 6 5/8 in (2.00 m)	5.20 s	1.77 s	2.98 s	4.82 s	7.46 s	22 reps
All values from NFL Combine/Pro Day

=== Buffalo Bills ===
Van Pran-Granger was selected in the fifth round (141st overall) of the 2024 NFL draft by the Buffalo Bills. As a rookie, he appeared in 16 games and started one.

=== Indianapolis Colts ===
On August 30, 2026, Van Pran-Granger was traded to the Indianapolis Colts for a swap of 2027 sixth- and seventh-round picks.
