= Germantown High School (Mississippi) =

Location
- 409 Calhoun Station Parkway; Gluckstadt, Mississippi 39110; United States
- 32°32′08″N 90°06′16″W

Information
- Other names: GHS; Germantown
- Type: Public high school
- Motto: Mark Of Excellence
- Established: 2011
- School district: Madison County School District
- NCES School ID: 280279001381
- Principal: Cody Zumbro
- Teaching staff: 86.70 (on an FTE basis)
- Grades: 9–12
- Enrollment: 1,389 (2023–2024)
- Student to teacher ratio: 16.02
- Colors: Cardinal red, gold, black, white
- Athletics conference: MHSAA
- Nickname: Mavericks
- Website: ghs.madison-schools.com

Germantown High School (simply referred to as GHS or Germantown) is a public high school in Gluckstadt, Mississippi, United States (with a Madison postal address). It is part of the Madison County School District.

== History ==
The school's name Germantown comes from the history of German settlement in Gluckstadt, the community that it was built in.

Germantown High School is one of five public high schools in Madison County, Mississippi. The school was launched in August 2011 as part of the Madison County School District, one of the fastest-growing school districts in the state of Mississippi.

== Curriculum ==
The school offers a college-preparatory curriculum and includes teams for 18 varsity sports, varsity band and dance programs, and more than 20 school clubs. The school maintains a partnership with Holmes Community College in Ridgeland, Mississippi allowing academically qualified seniors to participate in a dual enrollment program, spending part of their day on each campus and taking college-level courses.

== Athletics ==
Germantown High School, with its teams named the "Mavericks," maintains 18 varsity sports. These include football, baseball, golf, soccer, track and field, cross-country, volleyball, tennis, swimming, bowling and their well-known Band (Marching). The school also has programs in the less-common high school sports of powerlifting and team dance.

== Notable alumni ==
- Zxavian Harris (2022), defensive tackle for the Ole Miss Rebels
- Branson Robinson (2022), running back for the Georgia Bulldogs
- Madison Booker (2023), basketball player for the Texas Longhorns
