= Adonai Mitchell =

American football player (born 2002)

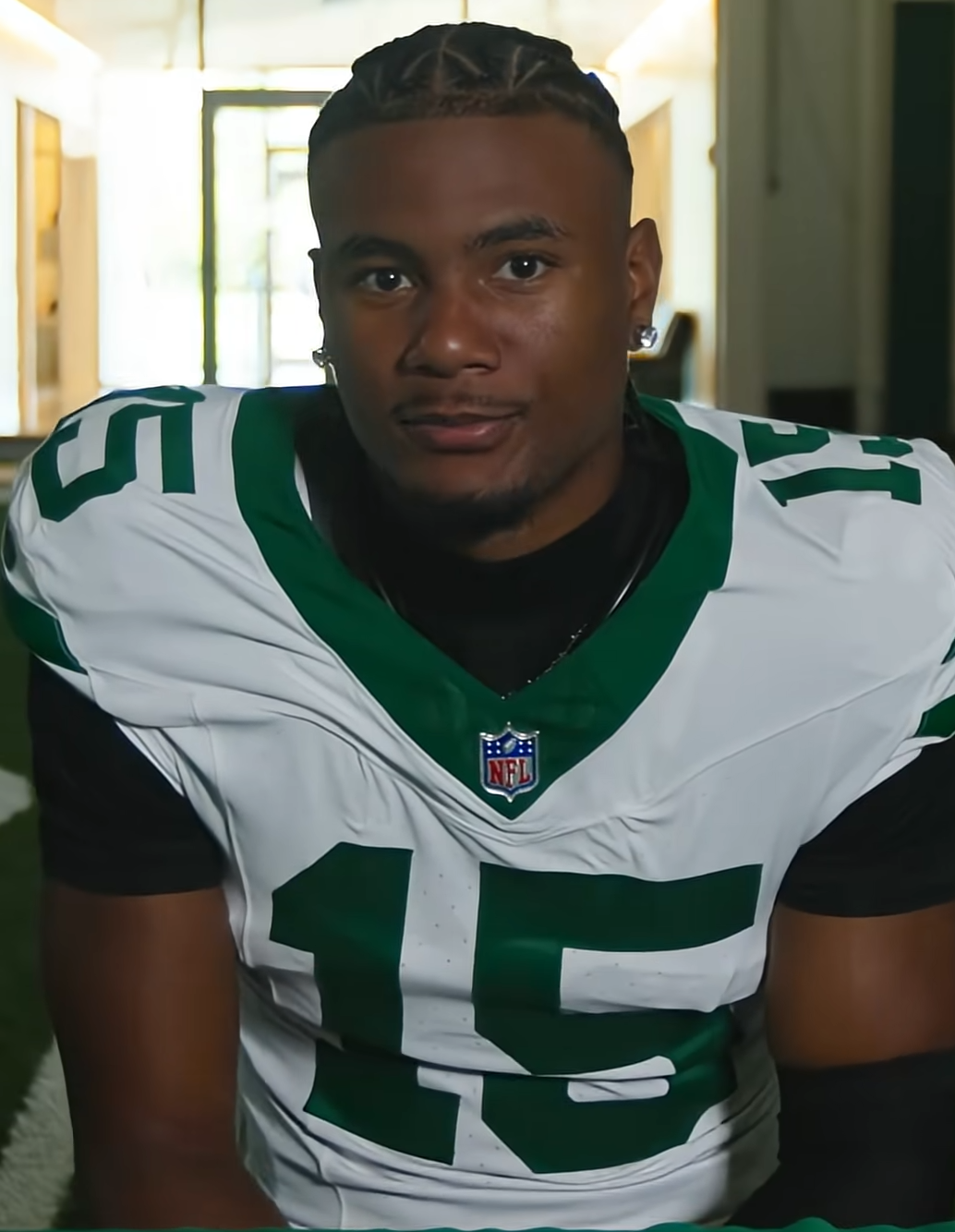
- Mitchell with the New York Jets in 2026

No. 15 – New York Jets
- Position: Wide receiver
- Roster status: Active

Personal information
- Born: October 8, 2002 (age 24); Missouri City, Texas, U.S.
- Listed height: 6 ft 2 in (1.88 m)
- Listed weight: 213 lb (97 kg)

Career information
- High school: Cane Ridge (Nashville, Tennessee)
- College: Georgia (2021–2022); Texas (2023)
- NFL draft: 2024: 2nd round, 52nd overall pick

Career history
- Indianapolis Colts (2024–2025); New York Jets (2025–present)

Awards and highlights
- 2× CFP national champion (2021, 2022); Big 12 Offensive Newcomer of the Year (2023); Second-team All-Big 12 (2023)

Career NFL statistics as of Week 9, 2026
- Receptions: 72
- Receiving yards: 1,030
- Receiving touchdowns: 3
- Rushing yards: 2
- Stats at Pro Football Reference

Adonai Enlil "AD" Mitchell (born October 8, 2002) is an American professional football wide receiver for the New York Jets of the National Football League (NFL). He played college football for the Georgia Bulldogs and Texas Longhorns before being selected by the Indianapolis Colts in the second round of the 2024 NFL draft.

== Early life ==
Mitchell was born on October 8, 2002, in Missouri City, Texas. He attended Cane Ridge High School in Antioch, Tennessee, a neighborhood of Nashville. During his high school career, he had 53 receptions for 795 yards, 8 receiving touchdowns, 373 rushing yards, and 9 rushing touchdowns on 68 attempts.

Mitchell was named the 2019 Tennessean Region 5-6A Athlete of the Year following a season which saw him record 28 receptions for 417 yards and 5 touchdowns in addition to 203 rushing yards and 4 touchdowns on 45 carries, leading his team to a 9–4 overall record and a 6-0 league record. Before the start of the 2020 high school season, he was named to the MaxPreps Preseason Tennessee All-State Second Team Offense.

Prior to his time at Cane Ridge High School, Mitchell attended Ridge Point High School in Missouri City, Texas, where he had 25 receptions totaling 378 yards and 3 touchdowns in addition to 170 rushing yards and 5 touchdowns on 23 carries. Following the season, he was named to the UIL Class 6A District 20 All-District Second Team Offense.

== College career ==
=== Georgia ===
Mitchell, a three-star recruit, enrolled at the University of Georgia in January 2021 after flipping his commitment from Ole Miss from July 2020. This came following his recruitment by top-ranked football programs such as Auburn, Missouri, West Virginia, and Boston College, among others. In the Georgia Bulldogs' spring game in April 2021, he caught 7 of his 13 targets for 105 yards and 1 touchdown. During week three of the 2021 Georgia Bulldogs season, Mitchell was named SEC Freshman of the Week following a performance that saw him record four receptions for 77 yards and one touchdown vs South Carolina.

He was a key part of the 2022 College Football National Championship victory at the end of the 2021 season, catching the go-ahead 40-yard touchdown pass from Stetson Bennett with 8 minutes remaining. During the celebration of the victory, Mitchell was interviewed by CBS Atlanta affiliate, WGCL, where he recounted the catch, "It was amazing to answer that call when it came, be that answer that the team to come through." Mitchell finished the season as the Bulldogs' third-ranked receiver, totaling 29 receptions for 426 yards and four touchdowns.

Mitchell's sophomore 2022 season was hampered by injury — specifically an ankle hurt during the Bulldogs' week 2 game against Samford. The injury lingered throughout the season and he only saw action in 6 games, catching just 9 balls for 134 yards and 3 touchdowns — numbers that would be, by far, the worst of his college career. He missed six games with the injury before making it back for the SEC title game against LSU. In that game, he slipped and fell on a potential touchdown route late in the first quarter, but later managed to make his mark in the box score when he rolled out to his right on a trick two-point conversion pass, zipping a spiral to teammate Darnell Washington for the score.

=== Texas ===
Mitchell transferred to Texas in 2023. He had 55 receptions for 845 yards and 11 touchdowns.

== Professional career ==
Pre-draft measurables
Height	Weight	Arm length	Hand span	Wingspan	40-yard dash	10-yard split	20-yard split	Vertical jump	Broad jump
6 ft 2 1/4 in (1.89 m)	205 lb (93 kg)	32 3/8 in (0.82 m)	9 in (0.23 m)	6 ft 5 5/8 in (1.97 m)	4.34 s	1.52 s	2.50 s	39.5 in (1.00 m)	11 ft 4 in (3.45 m)
All values from NFL Combine

=== Indianapolis Colts ===
Mitchell was selected in the second round, 52nd overall, by the Indianapolis Colts in the 2024 NFL draft. Indianapolis received the pick in a trade with the Carolina Panthers for the 46th overall pick (Jonathon Brooks), the Colts in exchange receiving two fifth-round picks (No. 142: Anthony Gould) (No. 155: the Philadelphia Eagles selected Jeremiah Trotter Jr.) as well.

Mitchell began the 2024 season as a starter for the Colts, on the field for the first snap in four of his first seven contests. During that period, he was targeted 27 times but made just 10 catches for 109 total yards — drawing some attention at one point for dropping the ball in an apparent aversion to forthcoming contact. He was subsequently eased from the starting lineup with the return from injury of second-year player Josh Downs, who suffered a sprained ankle during training camp. Colts receivers coach Reggie Wayne expressed complete confidence in Mitchell, attributing his miscues to normal rookie jitters. "Just keep watching," Wayne urged. Mitchell ended the season with seven starts, 23 receptions, and 312 receiving yards.

In Week 4 of the 2025 season against the Los Angeles Rams, Mitchell dropped the ball at the end zone during his celebration, accidentally leading to a touchback instead of a touchdown. He played a total eight games during the season before being traded.

=== New York Jets ===
On November 4, 2025, the Colts traded Mitchell along with two first round picks (2026 (No. 16) and 2027) to the New York Jets in exchange for cornerback Sauce Gardner.

On November 30, Mitchell recorded his first career touchdown on a 52-yard reception from quarterback Tyrod Taylor in the Jets' 27–24 win over the Atlanta Falcons.

== Career statistics ==
=== NFL ===
Legend
**Bold**	Career High

==== Regular season ====
Year	Team	Games		Receiving					Rushing					Fumbles	
Year	Team	GP	GS	Rec	Yds	Avg	Lng	TD	Att	Yds	Avg	Lng	TD	Fum	Lost
2024	IND	17	7	23	**312**	13.6	36	0	**4**	**6**	**1.5**	**10**	0	**2**	**1**
2025	IND	8	1	9	152	**16.9**	**75**	0	0	0	0.0	0	0	1	**1**
2025	NYJ	8	4	**24**	301	12.5	52	2	1	-4	-4.0	-4	0	0	0
2026	NYJ	2	2	9	123	13.7	40	0	0	0	0.0	0	0	0	0
Career		35	14	65	888	13.7	75	2	5	2	0.4	10	0	3	2

=== College ===
Year	Team	G	Rec	Yds	Avg	TD
2021	Georgia	**15**	29	426	14.7	4
2022	Georgia	6	9	134	14.9	3
2023	Texas	14	**55**	**845**	**15.4**	**11**
Career		35	93	1,405	15.1	18

== Personal life ==
Mitchell is nicknamed "AD" and has a daughter. Mitchell was diagnosed with Type 1 diabetes at age 16.
