= 2022 LSU Tigers football team =

American college football season

2022 LSU Tigers football

SEC Western Division co-champion Citrus Bowl champion

SEC Championship, L 30–50 vs. Georgia

Citrus Bowl, W 63–7 vs. Purdue
- Conference: Southeastern Conference
- Western Division

Ranking
- Coaches: No. 15
- AP: No. 16
- Record: 10–4 (6–2 SEC)
- Head coach: Brian Kelly (1st season)
- Offensive coordinator: Mike Denbrock (1st season)
- Offensive scheme: Multiple
- Defensive coordinator: Matt House (1st season)
- Base defense: 3–4 or 4–3
- Home stadium: Tiger Stadium

2022 Southeastern Conference football standings
	Conf.			Overall
Team	W		L	W		L
Eastern Division
No. 1 Georgia xy$#^	8	–	0	15	–	0
No. 6 Tennessee	6	–	2	11	–	2
No. 23 South Carolina	4	–	4	8	–	5
Kentucky	3	–	5	7	–	6
Florida	3	–	5	6	–	7
Missouri	3	–	5	6	–	7
Vanderbilt	2	–	6	5	–	7
Western Division
No. 16 LSU xy	6	–	2	10	–	4
No. 5 Alabama x	6	–	2	11	–	2
No. 20 Mississippi State	4	–	4	9	–	4
Ole Miss	4	–	4	8	–	5
Arkansas	3	–	5	7	–	6
Auburn	2	–	6	5	–	7
Texas A&M	2	–	6	5	–	7
Championship: Georgia 50, LSU 30
# – College Football Playoff champion; ^ – College Football Playoff participant; $ – Conference champion; x – Division champion/co-champions; y – Championship game participant; Rankings from AP Poll

The 2022 LSU Tigers football team represented Louisiana State University in the 2022 NCAA Division I FBS football season. The Tigers played their home games at Tiger Stadium in Baton Rouge, Louisiana, and competed in the Western Division of the Southeastern Conference (SEC). They were led by first-year head coach Brian Kelly.

The top-ranked recruit in LSU's 2022 recruiting class was linebacker Harold Perkins. The season also saw Arizona State transfer Jayden Daniels start at quarterback.

== Before the season ==
On November 30, 2021, Notre Dame head coach Brian Kelly was named LSU's 33rd head coach. Cincinnati offensive coordinator/quarterbacks coach Mike Denbrock and Kansas City Chiefs linebackers coach Matt House were named as the Tigers' new offensive coordinator and defensive coordinator, respectively.

== SEC media days ==
The 2022 SEC Media days were held in July 2022. The Preseason Polls were released in July 2022. Each team had their head coach available to talk to the media at the event. Coverage of the event was televised on SEC Network and ESPN.

Media poll (West Division)
Predicted finish	Team	Votes (1st place)
1	Alabama	177
2	Texas A&M	3
3	Arkansas	1
4	Ole Miss	
5	LSU	
6	Mississippi State	
7	Auburn	

Media poll (SEC Championship)
Rank	Team	Votes
1	Alabama	158
2	Georgia	18
3	South Carolina	3

== Schedule ==
LSU and the SEC announced the 2022 football schedule on September 21, 2021.

Date	Time	Opponent	Rank	Site	TV	Result	Attendance
September 4	6:30 p.m.	vs. Florida State*		Caesars Superdome; New Orleans, LA (Louisiana Kickoff)	ABC	L 23–24	68,388
September 10	6:30 p.m.	Southern*		Tiger Stadium; Baton Rouge, LA	SECN	W 65–17	102,321
September 17	5:00 p.m.	Mississippi State		Tiger Stadium; Baton Rouge, LA (rivalry)	ESPN	W 31–16	98,520
September 24	6:30 p.m.	New Mexico*		Tiger Stadium; Baton Rouge, LA	ESPN+/SECN+	W 38–0	100,501
October 1	6:00 p.m.	at Auburn		Jordan–Hare Stadium; Auburn, AL (rivalry)	ESPN	W 21–17	87,451
October 8	11:00 a.m.	No. 8 Tennessee	No. 25	Tiger Stadium; Baton Rouge, LA	ESPN	L 13–40	102,321
October 15	6:00 p.m.	at Florida		Ben Hill Griffin Stadium; Gainesville, FL (rivalry)	ESPN	W 45–35	90,585
October 22	2:30 p.m.	No. 7 Ole Miss^{†}		Tiger Stadium; Baton Rouge, LA (Magnolia Bowl, SEC Nation)	CBS	W 45–20	100,821
November 5	6:00 p.m.	No. 6 Alabama	No. 10	Tiger Stadium; Baton Rouge, LA (rivalry)	ESPN	W 32–31 ^{OT}	102,321
November 12	11:00 a.m.	at Arkansas	No. 7	Donald W. Reynolds Razorback Stadium; Fayetteville, AR (rivalry)	ESPN	W 13–10	73,750
November 19	8:00 p.m.	UAB*	No. 6	Tiger Stadium; Baton Rouge, LA	ESPN2	W 41–10	97,367
November 26	6:00 p.m.	at Texas A&M	No. 5	Kyle Field; College Station, TX (rivalry)	ESPN	L 23–38	93,578
December 3	3:00 p.m.	vs. No. 1 Georgia	No. 14	Mercedes-Benz Stadium; Atlanta, GA (SEC Championship)	CBS	L 30–50	74,810
January 2, 2023	12:00 p.m.	vs. Purdue*	No. 17	Camping World Stadium; Orlando, FL (Citrus Bowl)	ABC	W 63–7	42,791
*Non-conference game; ^{†}Homecoming; Rankings from AP Poll (and CFP Rankings, after November 1) - Released prior to game; All times are in Central time

== Roster ==
2022 LSU Tigers football team roster
Players
Coaches
Offense

Pos.	#	Name	Class
WR	2	Kyren Lacy	Jr
RB	4	John Emery Jr.	Sr
QB	5	Jayden Daniels	Jr
WR	7	Kayshon Boutte	Jr
WR	8	Malik Nabers	So
WR	10	Jaray Jenkins	Sr
WR	11	Brian Thomas Jr.	So
QB	12	Tavion Faulk	Fr
QB	13	Garrett Nussmeier	Fr
QB	14	Walker Howard	Fr
QB	15	Matt O'Dowd	Fr
QB	16	George Hamsley	Fr
WR	17	Chris Hilton Jr. (injured)	Fr
RB	21	Noah Cain	Jr
RB	22	Armoni Goodwin (injured)	So
RB	23	Corren Norman	Jr
WR	24	Landon Ibieta	Fr
WR	26	Gregory Clayton Jr.	Jr
RB	27	Josh Williams	Jr
WR	28	Cowinn Helaire	Fr
WR	33	Javen Nicholas	Fr
RB	36	Nick Demas	So
WR	37	R. J. Willis	Fr
RB	38	Malachi Lane	Fr
TE	45	GiVanni Peterson	Fr
TE	48	M. J. Frazier	GS
OL	50	Emery Jones Jr.	Fr
OL	52	Tre'Mond Shorts	Sr
OL	53	Brian Balestra	Fr
OL	55	Kimo Makane'ole	Fr
OL	58	Kardell Thomas	Jr
OL	61	Cameron Wire	Sr
OL	63	Lanson Smith	Fr
OL	64	Joshua Billedeaux	Fr
OL	66	Will Campbell	Fr
OL	67	Bo Bordelon	Fr
OL	69	Charles Turner III	Jr
OL	70	Miles Frazier	So
OL	71	Xavier Hill	So
OL	72	Garrett Dellinger	So
OL	73	Jack McDevitt	Fr
OL	74	Marcus Dumervil	So
OL	75	Anthony Bradford	Jr
OL	77	Marlon Martinez	Jr
WR	80	Jack Bech	So
TE	82	Jack Mashburn	Jr
TE	83	Gabe Leonards	Fr
WR	84	Noah Nash	Fr
TE	85	Nick Storz	GS
TE	86	Mason Taylor	Fr
TE	87	Kole Taylor	Jr
WR	88	Evan Francioni	Sr
WR	89	Jack Rilling	Fr

Defense

Pos.	#	Name	Class
DT	0	Maason Smith (injured)	So
CB	1	Sevyn Banks	GS
CB	2	Mekhi Garner	Jr
S	3	Greg Brooks Jr.	Sr
S	4	Todd Harris Jr.	GS
S	5	Jay Ward	Sr
LB	6	Mike Jones Jr.	Jr
LB	8	Desmond Little	Jr
DE	11	Ali Gaye	Sr
S	12	Derrick Davis Jr.	So
S	13	Joe Foucha	Sr
S	14	Matthew Langlois	So
S	15	Sage Ryan	Fr
CB	16	Quad Wilson	So
DE	17	Zavier Carter	So
DE	18	BJ Ojulari	Jr
S	19	Jordan Allen	Fr
DB	22	Colby Richardson	GS
LB	23	Micah Baskerville	Sr
CB	24	Jarrick Bernard-Converse	Sr
LB	25	Kolbe Fields	Fr
CB	26	Damarius McGhee	So
CB	27	Laterrance Welch	Fr
S	28	Major Burns	So
CB	29	Jaelyn Davis-Robinson	Fr
LB	30	Greg Penn III	So
CB	31	Everett Garard	Fr
LB	32	DeMario Tolan	Fr
LB	33	West Weeks	So
DE	35	Sai'vion Jones	So
CB	36	Dylan Brown	Fr
LB	37	Hunter Faust	Sr
CB	39	Raydarious Jones (S)	Jr
LB	40	Harold Perkins	Fr
CB	41	Ralph Walker	Fr
DE	42	Lane Blue	Fr
LB	43	Matt Jayne	So
S	47	Aristotle Abraham II	Fr
LB	48	Sloan Wright	So
LB	51	Seth Marcione	Fr
DT	56	Deshaun Richardson	Fr
LB	58	Jared Small	Sr
DL	68	Fitzgerald West Jr.	Fr
DT	81	Bryce Langston	Fr
DT	90	Jacobian Guillory	So
DE	91	Kells Bush	Fr
DL	92	Mekhi Wingo	So
DE	93	Quency Wiggins	Fr
DE	94	Princeton Malbrue	Fr
DE	95	Tygee Hill	Fr
DT	98	Wes Woodward	Fr
DT	99	Jaquelin Roy	Jr

Special teams

Pos.	#	Name	Class
P	19	Jay Bramblett	Sr
K	31	Nathan Dibert	Fr
K	34	Damian Ramos	Fr
P	38	Peyton Todd	Fr
K	39	Ezekeal Mata	So
LS	44	Slade Roy	So
LS	47	Jake Davis	Fr
LS	49	Jonathan Ferguson	Fr

Head coach

- Brian Kelly

Coordinators/assistant coaches

- Frank Wilson – Associate head coach/running backs
- Matt House – Defensive coordinator/linebackers
- Mike Denbrock – Offensive coordinator/tight ends
- Brian Polian – Special teams coordinator/recruiting coordinator
- Brad Davis – Offensive line
- Joe Sloan – Quarterbacks
- Kerry Cooks – Safeties
- Robert Steeples – Cornerbacks
- Cortez Hankton – Wide receivers
- Jamar Cain – Defensive line/run game coordinator
- Jake Flint – Director, athletic development
- Antonio Fenelus – Defensive analyst

Legend

- (C) Team captain
- (S) Suspended
- (I) Ineligible
- Injured
- Redshirt

Roster
Last update: 11/12/22

== Game summaries ==
=== Vs. Florida State ===
Florida State Seminoles vs. LSU Tigers – Game summary

Quarter	1	2	3	4	Total
Seminoles	0	7	10	7	24
Tigers	3	0	7	13	23

at Caesars Superdome, New Orleans, Louisiana

- Date: September 4
- Game time: 6:30 p.m. CDT
- Game weather: None (played indoors)
- Game attendance: 68,388
- Referee: Michael Vandervelde
- TV announcers (ABC): Joe Tessitore, Greg McElroy and Katie George
- Box score, Recap

Game information

First quarter

- LSU – Damian Ramos 36-yard field goal, 11:41. Tigers 3–0. Drive: 8 plays, 46 yards, 3:19.

Second quarter

- FSU – Ontaria Wilson 39-yard pass from Jordan Travis (Ryan Fitzgerald kick), 13:00. Seminoles 7–3. Drive: 14 plays, 85 yards, 6:59.

Third quarter

- FSU – Ryan Fitzgerald 25-yard field goal, 8:29. Seminoles 10–3. Drive: 14 plays, 68 yards, 6:31.
- FSU – Ontaria Wilson 27-yard pass from Jordan Travis (Ryan Fitzgerald kick), 4:17. Seminoles 17–3. Drive: 8 plays, 57 yards, 2:46.
- LSU – Noah Cain 1-yard run (Damian Ramos kick), 0:08. Seminoles 17–10. Drive: 10 plays, 82 yards, 4:09.

Fourth quarter

- FSU – D. J. Lundy 1-yard run (Ryan Fitzgerald kick), 9:04. Seminoles 24–10. Drive: 12 plays, 79 yards, 6:04.
- LSU – Jaray Jenkins 22-yard pass from Jayden Daniels (Damian Ramos kick), 4:07. Seminoles 24–17. Drive: 15 plays, 75 yards, 4:57.
- LSU – Jaray Jenkins 2-yard pass from Jayden Daniels (kick blocked), 0:00. Seminoles 24–23. Drive: 11 plays, 99 yards, 1:20.

Top passers

- FSU – Jordan Travis – 20/33, 260 yards, 2 TD
- LSU – Jayden Daniels – 25/34, 209 yards, 2 TD

Top rushers

- FSU – Treshaun Ward – 16 rushes, 49 yards
- LSU – Jayden Daniels – 16 rushes, 114 yards

Top receivers

- FSU – Ontaria Wilson – 7 receptions, 102 yards, 2 TD
- LSU – Jaray Jenkins – 5 receptions, 46 yards, 2 TD

=== Southern ===
Southern Jaguars at LSU Tigers – Game summary

Quarter	1	2	3	4	Total
Jaguars	0	0	7	10	17
Tigers	37	14	7	7	65

at Tiger Stadium, Baton Rouge, Louisiana

- Date: September 10
- Game time: 6:30 p.m. CDT
- Game weather: Sunny, 86 °F (30 °C)
- Game attendance: 102,321
- Referee: Scott Walker
- TV announcers (SECN): Tom Hart, Jordan Rodgers and Cole Cubelic
- Box score, Recap

Game information

First quarter

- LSU – Jayden Daniels 18-yard run (Damian Ramos kick), 13:25. Tigers 7–0. Drive: 3 plays, 21 yards, 1:29.
- LSU – Josh Williams 5-yard run (Damian Ramos kick), 11:46. Tigers 14–0. Drive: 4 plays, 62 yards, 1:13.
- LSU – Jack Bech 17-yard pass from Jayden Daniels (Damian Ramos kick), 7:16. Tigers 21–0. Drive: 5 plays, 71 yards, 2:52.
- LSU – Micah Baskerville 29-yard interception return (Damian Ramos kick), 7:07. Tigers 28–0.
- LSU – Malik Nabers 5-yard pass from Jayden Daniels (Damian Ramos kick), 4:44. Tigers 35–0. Drive: 4 plays, 24 yards, 0:59.
- LSU – Micah Baskerville blocked punt for a safety, 1:31. Tigers 37–0.

Second quarter

- LSU – Brian Thomas Jr. 44-yard pass from Jayden Daniels (Damian Ramos kick), 14:20. Tigers 44–0. Drive: 5 plays, 65 yards, 2:04.
- LSU – Noah Cain 2-yard run (Damian Ramos kick), 1:06. Tigers 51–0. Drive: 6 plays, 80 yards, 1:28.

Third quarter

- LSU – Armoni Goodwin 2-yard run (Damian Ramos kick), 8:42. Tigers 58–0. Drive: 8 plays, 59 yards, 3:26.
- SOU – Benny McCray 94-yard interception return (Luke Jackson kick), 3:45. Tigers 58–7.

Fourth quarter

- LSU – Armoni Goodwin 1-yard run (Damian Ramos kick), 14:01. Tigers 65–7. Drive: 10 plays, 75 yards, 4:44.
- SOU – Karl Ligon 1-yard run (Luke Jackson kick), 8:15. Tigers 65–14. Drive: 11 plays, 79 yards, 5:35.
- SOU – Luke Jackson 29-yard field goal, 0:00. Tigers 65–17. Drive: 8 plays, 59 yards, 3:25.

Top passers

- SOU – BeSean McCray – 9/16, 61 yards, INT
- LSU – Garrett Nussmeier – 13/23, 183 yards, 2 INT

Top rushers

- SOU – Jerrod Sims – 15 rushes, 79 yards
- LSU – Armoni Goodwin – 12 rushes, 85 yards, TD

Top receivers

- SOU – Cornelius Dyson – 1 reception, 29 yards
- LSU – Malik Nabers – 3 receptions, 81 yards, TD

=== Mississippi State ===
Mississippi State Bulldogs at LSU Tigers – Game summary

Quarter	1	2	3	4	Total
Bulldogs	6	7	3	0	16
Tigers	0	7	3	21	31

at Tiger Stadium, Baton Rouge, Louisiana

- Date: September 17
- Game time: 5:00 p.m. CDT
- Game weather: Sunny, 89 °F (32 °C)
- Game attendance: 98,520
- Referee: James Carter
- TV announcers (ESPN): Joe Tessitore, Greg McElroy and Katie George
- Box score, Recap

Game information

First quarter

- MSST – Jo'Quavious Marks 37-yard run (kick failed), 7:30. Bulldogs 6–0. Drive: 9 plays, 87 yards, 4:55.

Second quarter

- MSST – RaRa Thomas 13-yard pass from Will Rogers (Ben Raybon kick), 2:14. Bulldogs 13–0. Drive: 3 plays, 48 yards, 0:54.
- LSU – Jaray Jenkins 8-yard pass from Jayden Daniels (Damian Ramos kick), 0:46. Bulldogs 13–7. Drive: 7 plays, 75 yards, 1:28.

Third quarter

- LSU – Damian Ramos 35-yard field goal, 10:56. Bulldogs 13–10. Drive: 9 plays, 69 yards, 2:33.
- MSST – Ben Raybon 45-yard field goal, 6:31. Bulldogs 16–10. Drive: 10 plays, 34 yards, 4:25.

Fourth quarter

- LSU – Jayden Daniels 3-yard run (Damian Ramos kick), 14:11. Tigers 17–16. Drive: 3 plays, 9 yards, 1:22.
- LSU – Josh Williams 7-yard run (Damian Ramos kick), 6:53. Tigers 24–16. Drive: 14 plays, 85 yards, 6:01.
- LSU – Armoni Goodwin 47-yard run (Damian Ramos kick), 4:50. Tigers 31–16. Drive: 4 plays, 59 yards, 1:28.

Top passers

- MSST – Will Rogers – 24/42, 214 yards, TD, INT
- LSU – Jayden Daniels – 22/37, 210 yards, TD

Top rushers

- MSST – Jo'Quavious Marks – 9 rushes, 50 yards, TD
- LSU – Jayden Daniels – 16 rushes, 93 yards, TD

Top receivers

- MSST – RaRa Thomas – 4 receptions, 67 yards, TD
- LSU – Malik Nabers – 6 receptions, 76 yards

=== New Mexico ===
New Mexico Lobos at LSU Tigers – Game summary

Quarter	1	2	3	4	Total
Lobos	0	0	0	0	0
Tigers	10	7	14	7	38

at Tiger Stadium, Baton Rouge, Louisiana

- Date: September 24
- Game time: 6:30 p.m. CDT
- Game weather: Sunny, 93 °F (34 °C)
- Game attendance: 100,501
- Referee: Ted Pitts
- TV announcers (ESPN+/SECN+): Mike Corey, Dave Steckel and Jalyn Johnson
- Box score, Recap

Game information

First quarter

- LSU – Armoni Goodwin 5-yard run (Damian Ramos kick), 9:52. Tigers 7–0. Drive: 8 plays, 57 yards, 2:49.
- LSU – Damian Ramos 31-yard field goal, 2:23. Tigers 10–0. Drive: 7 plays, 71 yards, 3:11.

Second quarter

- LSU – Armoni Goodwin 1-yard run (Damian Ramos kick), 0:23. Tigers 17–0. Drive: 15 plays, 88 yards, 5:44.

Third quarter

- LSU – Noah Cain 1-yard run (Damian Ramos kick), 5:27. Tigers 24–0. Drive: 11 plays, 80 yards, 5:44.
- LSU – Noah Cain 49-yard run (Damian Ramos kick), 1:45. Tigers 31–0. Drive: 4 plays, 74 yards, 1:26.

Fourth quarter

- LSU – Brian Thomas Jr. 57-yard pass from Garrett Nussmeier (Damian Ramos kick), 13:14. Tigers 38–0. Drive: 4 plays, 73 yards, 1:33.

Top passers

- UNM – Miles Kendrick – 4/6, 51 yards
- LSU – Jayden Daniels – 24/29, 279 yards

Top rushers

- UNM – Nathaniel Jones – 8 rushes, 33 yards
- LSU – Noah Cain – 11 rushes, 94 yards, 2 TD

Top receivers

- UNM – Jaden Hullaby – 1 reception, 38 yards
- LSU – Brian Thomas Jr. – 2 receptions, 65 yards, TD

=== At Auburn ===
LSU Tigers at Auburn Tigers – Game summary

Quarter	1	2	3	4	Total
LSU Tigers	0	14	7	0	21
Auburn Tigers	7	10	0	0	17

at Jordan–Hare Stadium, Auburn, Alabama

- Date: October 1
- Game time: 6:00 p.m. CDT
- Game weather: Clear
- Game attendance: 87,451
- Referee: Lee Hedrick
- TV announcers (ESPN): Joe Tessitore, Greg McElroy and Katie George
- Box score, Recap

Game information

First quarter

- AUB – Ja'Varrius Johnson 53-yard pass from Robby Anderson (Anders Carlson kick), 12:57. Auburn 7–0. Drive: 6 plays, 69 yards, 2:03.

Second quarter

- AUB – Camden Brown 52-yard pass from Robby Anderson (Anders Carlson kick), 14:04. Auburn 14–0. Drive: 6 plays, 99 yards, 2:56.
- AUB – Anders Carlson 29-yard field goal, 9:38. Auburn 17–0. Drive: 7 plays, 48 yards, 2:32.
- LSU – Jay Ward 23-yard fumble return (Damian Ramos kick), 6:33. Auburn 17–7.
- LSU – Jayden Daniels 1-yard run (Damian Ramos kick), 0:15. Auburn 17–14. Drive: 11 plays, 77 yards, 1:41.

Third quarter

- LSU – John Emery Jr. 20-yard run (Damian Ramos kick), 3:32. LSU 21–17. Drive: 7 plays, 63 yards, 3:34.

Fourth quarter

- No scoring plays

Top passers

- LSU – Jayden Daniels – 8/20, 80 yards
- AUB – Robby Ashford – 19/38, 337 yards, 2 TD, INT

Top rushers

- LSU – Josh Williams – 17 rushes, 68 yards
- AUB – Tank Bigsby – 12 rushes, 45 yards

Top receivers

- LSU – John Emery Jr. – 1 reception, 38 yards
- AUB – Ja'Varrius Johnson – 3 receptions, 74 yards, TD

=== No. 8 Tennessee ===
No. 8 Tennessee Volunteers at No. 25 LSU Tigers – Game summary

Quarter	1	2	3	4	Total
No. 8 Volunteers	13	10	14	3	40
No. 25 Tigers	0	7	0	6	13

at Tiger Stadium, Baton Rouge, Louisiana

- Date: October 8
- Game time: 11:00 a.m. CDT
- Game weather: Sunny, 79 °F (26 °C)
- Game attendance: 102,321
- Referee: Steve Marlowe
- TV announcers (ESPN): Bob Wischusen, Dan Orlovsky, Todd McShay and Kris Budden
- Box score, Recap

Game information

First quarter

- TENN – Jabari Small 1-yard run (Chase McGrath kick), 13:46. Volunteers 7–0. Drive: 5 plays, 27 yards, 1:14.
- TENN – Chase McGrath 35-yard field goal, 11:08. Volunteers 10–0. Drive: 4 plays, 8 yards, 1:23.
- TENN – Chase McGrath 38-yard field goal, 2:26. Volunteers 13–0. Drive: 11 plays, 68 yards, 3:22.

Second quarter

- TENN – Jalin Hyatt 45-yard pass from Hendon Hooker (Chase McGrath kick), 14:39. Volunteers 20–0. Drive: 1 play, 45 yards, 0:07.
- LSU – Josh Williams 1-yard run (Damian Ramos kick), 3:05. Volunteers 20–7. Drive: 12 plays, 96 yards, 5:14.
- TENN – Chase McGrath 32-yard field goal, 0:00. Volunteers 23–7. Drive: 5 plays, 32 yards, 0:23.

Third quarter

- TENN – Jalin Hyatt 14-yard pass from Hendon Hooker (Chase McGrath kick), 11:47. Volunteers 30–7. Drive: 8 plays, 76 yards, 3:13.
- TENN – Jabari Small 5-yard run (Chase McGrath kick), 2:13. Volunteers 37–7. Drive: 8 plays, 92 yards, 3:19.

Fourth quarter

- LSU – Kayshon Boutte 5-yard pass from Jayden Daniels (run failed), 11:32. Volunteers 37–13. Drive: 13 plays, 75 yards, 5:41.
- TENN – Chase McGrath 32-yard field goal, 2:39. Volunteers 40–13. Drive: 13 plays, 81 yards, 8:53.

Top passers

- TENN – Hendon Hooker – 17/27, 239 yards, 2 TD
- LSU – Jayden Daniels – 32/45, 300 yards, TD, INT

Top rushers

- TENN – Jabari Small – 22 rushes, 127 yards, 2 TD
- LSU – Jayden Daniels – 16 rushes, 38 yards

Top receivers

- TENN – Bru McCoy – 7 receptions, 140 yards
- LSU – Malik Nabers – 6 receptions, 80 yards

=== At Florida ===
LSU Tigers at Florida Gators – Game summary

Quarter	1	2	3	4	Total
Tigers	7	21	14	3	45
Gators	14	7	0	14	35

at Ben Hill Griffin Stadium, Gainesville, Florida

- Date: October 15
- Game time: 6:00 p.m. CDT / 7:00 p.m. EDT
- Game weather: Sunny • Temperature: 77 °F (25 °C) • Wind: E at 3 miles per hour (4.8 km/h)
- Game attendance: 90,585
- Referee: Matt Loeffler
- TV announcers (ESPN): Joe Tessitore, Greg McElroy and Katie George
- Box score, Recap

Game information

First quarter

- FLA – Justin Shorter 51-yard pass from Anthony Richardson (Adam Mihalek kick), 14:01. Gators 7–0. Drive: 2 plays, 52 yards, 0:59.
- LSU – John Emery Jr. 7-yard pass from Jayden Daniels (Damian Ramos kick), 7:46. Tied 7–7. Drive: 12 plays, 75 yards, 6:15.
- FLA – Montrell Johnson Jr. 39-yard run (Adam Mihalek kick), 2:00. Gators 14–7. Drive: 10 plays, 75 yards, 5:46.

Second quarter

- LSU – Jayden Daniels 1-yard run (Damian Ramos kick), 11:55. Tied 14–14. Drive: 12 plays, 73 yards, 5:05.
- FLA – Montrell Johnson Jr. 3-yard run (Adam Mihalek kick), 8:13. Gators 21–14. Drive: 5 plays, 13 yards, 1:24.
- LSU – Brian Thomas Jr. 24-yard pass from Jayden Daniels (Damian Ramos kick), 5:55. Tied 21–21. Drive: 7 plays, 75 yards, 2:18.
- LSU – Jaray Jenkins 54-yard pass from Jayden Daniels (Damian Ramos kick), 2:24. Tigers 28–21. Drive: 5 plays, 83 yards, 1:55.

Third quarter

- LSU – Jayden Daniels 9-yard run (Damian Ramos kick), 13:17. Tigers 35–21. Drive: 4 plays, 75 yards, 1:43.
- LSU – Jayden Daniels 9-yard run (Damian Ramos kick), 1:07. Tigers 42–21. Drive: 13 plays, 88 yards, 5:51.

Fourth quarter

- FLA – Anthony Richardson 81-yard run (Adam Mihalek kick), 14:46. Tigers 42–28. Drive: 2 plays, 75 yards, 1:21.
- FLA – Trevor Etienne 1-yard run (Adam Mihalek kick), 7:39. Tigers 42–35. Drive: 11 plays, 80 yards, 5:18.
- LSU – Damian Ramos 47-yard field goal, 1:52. Tigers 45–35. Drive: 12 plays, 46 yards, 5:47.

Top passers

- LSU – Jayden Daniels – 23/32, 349 yards, 3 TD
- FLA – Anthony Richardson – 15/25, 185 yards, TD

Top rushers

- LSU – Josh Williams – 14 rushes, 106 yards
- FLA – Anthony Richardson – 9 rushes, 109 yards, TD

Top receivers

- LSU – Kayshon Boutte – 6 receptions, 115 yards
- FLA – Justin Shorter – 3 receptions, 71 yards, TD

=== No. 7 Ole Miss ===
No. 7 Ole Miss Rebels at LSU Tigers – Game summary

Quarter	1	2	3	4	Total
No. 7 Rebels	14	6	0	0	20
Tigers	3	14	7	21	45

at Tiger Stadium, Baton Rouge, Louisiana

- Date: October 22
- Game time: 2:30 p.m. CDT
- Game weather: Sunny, 80 °F (27 °C)
- Game attendance: 100,821
- Referee: Jason Autrey
- TV announcers (CBS): Brad Nessler, Gary Danielson and Jenny Dell
- Box score, Recap

Game information

First quarter

- MISS – Quinshon Judkins 6-yard run (Jonathan Cruz kick), 13:23. Rebels 7–0. Drive: 5 plays, 75 yards, 1:37.
- LSU – Damian Ramos 23-yard field goal, 8:44. Rebels 7–3. Drive: 12 plays, 69 yards, 4:39.
- MISS – Quinshon Judkins 3-yard run (Jonathan Cruz kick), 6:01. Rebels 14–3. Drive: 10 plays, 75 yards, 2:43.

Second quarter

- MISS – Jonathan Cruz 32-yard field goal, 14:57. Rebels 17–3. Drive: 9 plays, 61 yards, 2:57.
- LSU – Jaray Jenkins 34-yard pass from Jayden Daniels (Damian Ramos kick), 12:11. Rebels 17–10. Drive: 5 plays, 75 yards, 2:46.
- LSU – Jayden Daniels 3-yard run (Damian Ramos kick), 8:20. Tied 17–17. Drive: 7 plays, 78 yards, 3:02.
- MISS – Jonathan Cruz 48-yard field goal, 4:08. Rebels 20–17. Drive: 11 plays, 45 yards, 4:12.

Third quarter

- LSU – Mason Taylor 1-yard pass from Jayden Daniels (Damian Ramos kick), 8:25. Tigers 24–20. Drive: 10 plays, 50 yards, 3:58.

Fourth quarter

- LSU – Jayden Daniels 11-yard run (Damian Ramos kick), 14:18. Tigers 31–20. Drive: 10 plays, 80 yards, 4:45.
- LSU – Jayden Daniels 17-yard run (Damian Ramos kick), 8:36. Tigers 38–20. Drive: 7 plays, 80 yards, 3:05.
- LSU – Josh Williams 1-yard run (Damian Ramos kick), 2:05. Tigers 45–20. Drive: 8 plays, 38 yards, 5:31.

Top passers

- MISS – Jaxson Dart – 19/34, 283 yards, INT
- LSU – Jayden Daniels – 21/28, 248 yards, 2 TD

Top rushers

- MISS – Quinshon Judkins – 25 rushes, 111 yards, 2 TD
- LSU – Jayden Daniels – 23 rushes, 121 yards, 3 TD

Top receivers

- MISS – Malik Heath – 8 receptions, 145 yards
- LSU – Jaray Jenkins – 2 receptions, 51 yards, TD

=== No. 6 Alabama ===
No. 6 Alabama Crimson Tide at No. 10 LSU Tigers – Game summary

Quarter	1	2	3	4	OT	Total
No. 6 Crimson Tide	0	6	3	15	7	31
No. 10 Tigers	0	7	7	10	8	32

at Tiger Stadium, Baton Rouge, Louisiana

- Date: November 5
- Game time: 6:00 p.m. CDT
- Game weather: Sunny, 64 °F (18 °C)
- Game attendance: 102,321
- Referee: Ken Williamson
- TV announcers (ESPN): Chris Fowler, Kirk Herbstreit and Holly Rowe
- Box score, Recap

Game information

First quarter

- No scoring plays

Second quarter

- LSU – John Emery Jr. 30-yard pass from Jayden Daniels (Damian Ramos kick), 9:46. Tigers 7–0. Drive: 4 plays, 49 yards, 1:57.
- ALA – Will Reichard 29-yard field goal, 5:56. Tigers 7–3. Drive: 7 plays, 63 yards, 3:50.
- ALA – Will Reichard 36-yard field goal, 0:00. Tigers 7–6. Drive: 12 plays, 63 yards, 3:21.

Third quarter

- ALA – Will Reichard 38-yard field goal, 8:11. Crimson Tide 9–7. Drive: 15 plays, 55 yards, 6:49.
- LSU – Josh Williams 2-yard run (Damian Ramos kick), 3:30. Tigers 14–9. Drive: 11 plays, 75 yards, 4:41.

Fourth quarter

- ALA – Roydell Williams 2-yard run (pass failed), 12:37. Crimson Tide 15–14. Drive: 8 plays, 76 yards, 2:24.
- LSU – Damian Ramos 32-yard field goal, 6:52. Tigers 17–15. Drive: 11 plays, 69 yards, 5:45.
- ALA – Ja'Corey Brooks 41-yard pass from Bryce Young (pass failed), 4:44. Crimson Tide 21–17. Drive: 6 plays, 65 yards, 2:08.
- LSU – Mason Taylor 7-yard pass from Jayden Daniels (Damian Ramos kick), 1:47. Tigers 24–21. Drive: 7 plays, 75 yards, 2:57.
- ALA – Will Reichard 46-yard field goal, 0:21. Tied 24–24. Drive: 10 plays, 47 yards, 1:26.

Overtime

- ALA – Roydell Williams 1-yard run (Will Reichard kick). Crimson Tide 31–24. Drive: 7 plays, 25 yards.
- LSU – Jayden Daniels 25-yard run (Jayden Daniels pass to Mason Taylor). Tigers 32–31. Drive: 1 play, 25 yards.

Top passers

- ALA – Bryce Young – 25/51, 328 yards, TD, INT
- LSU – Jayden Daniels – 22/32, 182 yards, 2 TD

Top rushers

- ALA – Jahmyr Gibbs – 15 rushes, 99 yards
- LSU – Jayden Daniels – 18 rushes, 95 yards, TD

Top receivers

- ALA – Ja'Corey Brooks – 7 receptions, 97 yards, TD
- LSU – Kayshon Boutte – 7 receptions, 51 yards

=== At Arkansas ===
No. 7 LSU Tigers at Arkansas Razorbacks – Game summary

Quarter	1	2	3	4	Total
No. 7 Tigers	0	6	7	0	13
Razorbacks	3	0	0	7	10

at Donald W. Reynolds Razorback Stadium, Fayetteville, Arkansas

- Date: November 12
- Game time: 11:00 a.m. CDT
- Game weather: Sunny • Temperature: 34 °F (1 °C) • Wind: SE 11 miles per hour (18 km/h)
- Game attendance: 73,750
- Referee: James Carter
- TV announcers (ESPN): Joe Tessitore, Greg McElroy and Katie George
- Box score, Recap

Game information

First quarter

- ARK – Cam Little 28-yard field goal, 4:48. Razorbacks 3–0. Drive: 10 plays, 46 yards, 3:24.

Second quarter

- LSU – Damian Ramos 38-yard field goal, 9:28. Tied 3–3. Drive: 5 plays, 17 yards, 1:56.
- LSU – Damian Ramos 29-yard field goal, 1:46. Tigers 6–3. Drive: 11 plays, 61 yards, 5:17.

Third quarter

- LSU – Josh Williams 1-yard run (Damian Ramos kick), 5:25. Tigers 13–3. Drive: 5 plays, 40 yards, 1:51.

Fourth quarter

- ARK – Matt Landers 40-yard pass from Cade Fortin (Cam Little kick), 13:17. Tigers 13–10. Drive: 10 plays, 94 yards, 4:29.

Top passers

- LSU – Jayden Daniels – 8/15, 86 yards, INT
- ARK – Cade Fortin – 8/13, 92 yards, TD

Top rushers

- LSU – Josh Williams – 19 rushes, 122 yards, TD
- ARK – Raheim Sanders – 12 rushes, 46 yards

Top receivers

- LSU – Kayshon Boutte – 4 receptions, 49 yards
- ARK – Matt Landers – 2 receptions, 69 yards, TD

=== UAB ===
UAB Blazers at No. 6 LSU Tigers – Game summary

Quarter	1	2	3	4	Total
Blazers	7	3	0	0	10
No. 6 Tigers	14	14	6	7	41

at Tiger Stadium, Baton Rouge, Louisiana

- Date: November 19
- Game time: 8:00 p.m. CST
- Game weather: Cloudy, 46 °F (8 °C)
- Game attendance: 97,367
- Referee: Jason Autrey
- TV announcers (ESPN2): Clay Matvick, Rocky Boiman and Dawn Davenport
- Box score, Recap

Game information

First quarter

- LSU – John Emery Jr. 2-yard run (Damian Ramos kick), 10:44. Tigers 7–0. Drive: 9 plays, 79 yards, 4:11.
- UAB – DeWayne McBride 5-yard run (Matt Quinn kick), 9:19. Tied 7–7. Drive: 3 plays, 30 yards, 1:12.
- LSU – Noah Cain 5-yard run (Damian Ramos kick), 5:59. Tigers 14–7. Drive: 8 plays, 75 yards, 3:20.

Second quarter

- UAB – Matt Quinn 29-yard field goal, 14:57. Tigers 14–10. Drive: 11 plays, 63 yards, 6:02.
- LSU – Noah Cain 1-yard run (Damian Ramos kick), 5:20. Tigers 21–10. Drive: 12 plays, 79 yards, 5:16.
- LSU – Noah Cain 1-yard run (Damian Ramos kick), 0:40. Tigers 28–10. Drive: 4 plays, 55 yards, 0:34.

Third quarter

- LSU – Jayden Daniels 2-yard run (kick failed), 6:50. Tigers 34–10. Drive: 6 plays, 57 yards, 2:46.

Fourth quarter

- LSU – Brian Thomas Jr. 5-yard pass from Jayden Daniels (Damian Ramos kick), 9:46. Tigers 41–10. Drive: 9 plays, 86 yards, 3:34.

Top passers

- UAB – Dylan Hopkins – 14/29, 158 yards
- LSU – Jayden Daniels – 22/29, 297 yards, TD

Top rushers

- UAB – DeWayne McBride – 13 rushes, 34 yards, TD
- LSU – Jayden Daniels – 12 rushes, 111 yards, TD

Top receivers

- UAB – Bryce Damous – 3 receptions, 56 yards
- LSU – Malik Nabers – 7 receptions, 129 yards

=== At Texas A&M ===
No. 5 LSU Tigers at Texas A&M Aggies – Game summary

Quarter	1	2	3	4	Total
No. 5 Tigers	0	10	7	6	23
Aggies	7	10	7	14	38

at Kyle Field, College Station, Texas

- Date: November 26
- Game time: 6:00 p.m. CST
- Game weather: Sunny, 56 °F (13 °C)
- Game attendance: 93,578
- Referee: Kyle Olson
- TV announcers (ESPN): Joe Tessitore, Greg McElroy and Katie George
- Box score, Recap

Game information

First quarter

- TAMU – De'Von Achane 10-yard run (Randy Bond kick), 4:54. Aggies 7–0. Drive: 15 plays, 90 yards, 7:37.

Second quarter

- LSU – John Emery Jr. 4-yard kick (Damian Ramos kick), 14:00. Tied 7–7. Drive: 12 plays, 75 yards, 5:54.
- TAMU – Randy Bond 25-yard field goal, 9:23. Aggies 10–7. Drive: 12 plays, 58 yards, 4:37.
- LSU – Damian Ramos 34-yard field goal, 5:38. Tied 10–10. Drive: 10 plays, 59 yards, 3:45.
- TAMU – Donovan Green 3-yard pass from Conner Weigman (Randy Bond kick), 1:10. Aggies 17–10. Drive: 9 plays, 72 yards, 4:28.

Third quarter

- LSU – John Emery Jr. 19-yard run (Damian Ramos kick), 9:40. Tied 17–17. Drive: 9 plays, 71 yards, 4:34.
- TAMU – Demani Richardson 27-yard fumble return (Randy Bond kick), 7:03. Aggies 24–17.

Fourth quarter

- TAMU – Moose Muhammad III 21-yard pass from Conner Weigman (Randy Bond kick), 14:54. Aggies 31–17. Drive: 8 plays, 83 yards, 3:03.
- TAMU – De'Von Achane 10-yard run (Randy Bond kick), 7:46. Aggies 38–17. Drive: 8 plays, 77 yards, 4:43.
- LSU – John Emery Jr. 3-yard run (run failed), 6:21. Aggies 38–23. Drive: 6 plays, 75 yards, 1:25.

Top passers

- LSU – Jayden Daniels – 21/35, 189 yards
- TAMU – Conner Weigman – 12/18, 155 yards, 2 TD

Top rushers

- LSU – Jayden Daniels – 12 rushes, 84 yards
- TAMU – De'Von Achane – 38 rushes, 215 yards, 2 TD

Top receivers

- LSU – Malik Nabers – 7 receptions, 69 yards
- TAMU – Moose Muhammad III – 5 receptions, 94 yards, TD

=== Vs. No. 1 Georgia (SEC Championship game) ===
No. 14 LSU Tigers vs. No. 1 Georgia Bulldogs (SEC Championship game) – Game summary

Quarter	1	2	3	4	Total
No. 14 Tigers	7	3	13	7	30
No. 1 Bulldogs	14	21	7	8	50

at Mercedes-Benz Stadium, Atlanta, Georgia

- Date: December 3
- Game time: 3:00 p.m. CST/4:00 p.m. EST
- Game weather: None (retractable roof closed)
- Game attendance: 74,810
- Referee: David Smith
- TV announcers (CBS): Brad Nessler, Gary Danielson and Jenny Dell
- Recap

Game information

First quarter

- UGA – Christopher Smith II 96-yard blocked field goal return (Jack Podlesny kick), 3:33. Bulldogs 7–0.
- LSU – Kayshon Boutte 53-yard pass from Jayden Daniels (Damian Ramos kick), 2:21. Tied 7–7. Drive: 3 plays, 75 yards, 1:12.
- UGA – Brock Bowers 3-yard pass from Stetson Bennett (Jack Podlesny kick), 0:03. Bulldogs 14–7. Drive: 7 plays, 75 yards, 2:18.

Second quarter

- UGA – Ladd McConkey 22-yard pass from Stetson Bennett (Jack Podlesny kick), 14:43. Bulldogs 21–7. Drive: 1 play, 22 yards, 0:08.
- UGA – Darnell Washington 14-yard pass from Stetson Bennett (Jack Podlesny kick), 2:48. Bulldogs 28–7. Drive: 13 plays, 76 yards, 5:06.
- UGA – Dillon Bell 3-yard pass from Stetson Bennett (Jack Podlesny kick), 0:32. Bulldogs 35–7. Drive: 5 plays, 58 yards, 1:26.
- LSU – Damian Ramos 42-yard field goal, 0:00. Bulldogs 35–10. Drive: 7 plays, 51 yards, 0:32.

Third quarter

- LSU – Malik Nabers 34-yard pass from Garret Nussmeier (Damian Ramos kick), 10:33. Bulldogs 35–17. Drive: 3 plays, 57 yards, 0:51.
- UGA – Kenny McIntosh 2-yard run (Jack Podlesny kick), 3:32. Bulldogs 42–17. Drive: 8 plays, 95 yards, 4:27.
- LSU – Noah Cain 1-yard run (pass failed), 1:46. Bulldogs 42–23. Drive: 4 plays, 65 yards, 1:46.

Fourth quarter

- UGA – Kenny McIntosh 8-yard run (Adonai Mitchell pass to Darnell Washington), 13:13. Bulldogs 50–23. Drive: 7 plays, 75 yards, 3:33.
- LSU – Jaray Jenkins 33-yard pass from Garrett Nussmeier (Damian Ramos kick), 7:12. Bulldogs 50–30. Drive: 7 plays, 83 yards, 1:55.

Top passers

- LSU – Garrett Nussmeier – 15/27, 294 yards, 2 TD, INT
- UGA – Stetson Bennett – 23/29, 274 yards, 4 TD

Top rushers

- LSU – Josh Williams – 6 rushes, 55 yards
- UGA – Kendall Milton – 8 rushes, 113 yards

Top receivers

- LSU – Malik Nabers – 5 receptions, 128 yards, TD
- UGA – Brock Bowers – 6 receptions, 81 yards, TD

=== Vs. Purdue (Citrus Bowl) ===
Purdue Boilermakers vs. No. 17 LSU Tigers (Cheez-It Citrus Bowl) – Game summary

Quarter	1	2	3	4	Total
No. 17 LSU	14	21	14	14	63
Purdue	0	0	0	7	7

at Camping World Stadium • Orlando, Florida

- Date: Monday, January 2, 2023
- Game time: 1:00 p.m. EST
- Game weather: Sunny • Temperature: 79 °F (26 °C) • Wind: 4 mph (6.4 km/h) east
- Game attendance: 42,791
- Referee: Kevin Mar
- TV announcers (ABC): Bob Wischusen, Dan Orlovsky, Kris Budden
- Box score

Scoring summary

Quarter	Time	Drive			Team	Scoring information	Score	
Quarter	Time	Plays	Yards	TOP	Team	Scoring information	LSU	Purdue
1	7:01	10	63	4:46	LSU	John Emery Jr. 1-yard touchdown run, Damian Ramos kick good	7	0
1	1:06	8	67	3:14	LSU	Noah Cain 9-yard touchdown run, Damian Ramos kick good	14	0
2	13:03	5	62	2:05	LSU	Mason Taylor 32-yard touchdown reception from Jayden Daniels, Damian Ramos kick good	21	0
2	8:23	5	70	1:28	LSU	Noah Cain 9-yard touchdown run, Damian Ramos kick good	28	0
2	1:07	5	87	2:04	LSU	Brian Thomas Jr. 10-yard touchdown reception from Garrett Nussmeier, Damian Ramos kick good	35	0
3	9:21	9	45	3:04	LSU	Jayden Daniels 5-yard touchdown reception from Malik Nabers, Damian Ramos kick good	42	0
3	3:15	1	75	0:10	LSU	Malik Nabers 75-yard touchdown reception from Garrett Nussmeier, Damian Ramos kick good	49	0
4	13:53	9	75	4:22	Purdue	TJ Sheffield 16-yard touchdown reception from Michael Alaimo, Mitchell Fineran kick good	49	7
4	8:47	7	55	2:58	LSU	Derrick Davis Jr. 12-yard touchdown run, Ezekeal Mata kick good	56	7
4	0:40				LSU	Interception returned 99 yards for touchdown by Quad Wilson, Trey Finison kick good	63	7
"TOP" = time of possession. For other American football terms, see Glossary of American football.							63	7

LSU set new Citrus Bowl records for most points scored (63), largest margin of victory (56), and total offensive yards (594).

== Rankings ==
Ranking movements Legend: ██ Increase in ranking ██ Decrease in ranking — = Not ranked RV = Received votes
	Week															
Poll	Pre	1	2	3	4	5	6	7	8	9	10	11	12	13	14	Final
AP	RV	—	—	RV	RV	25	RV	RV	18	15	7	6	6	11	16	16
Coaches	RV	—	—	RV	RV	RV	RV	RV	20	17	8	7	6	13	15	15
CFP	Not released									10	7	6	5	14	17	Not released

== Players drafted into the NFL ==
Round	Pick	Player	Position	NFL club
2	41	BJ Ojulari	LB	Arizona Cardinals
4	108	Anthony Bradford	OG	Seattle Seahawks
4	134	Jay Ward	S	Minnesota Vikings
5	141	Jaquelin Roy	DT	Minnesota Vikings
6	187	Kayshon Boutte	WR	New England Patriots
6	204	Jarrick Bernard-Converse	S	New York Jets
