= 2022 Auburn Tigers football team =

American college football season

2022 Auburn Tigers football
- Conference: Southeastern Conference
- Western Division
- Record: 5–7 (2–6 SEC)
- Head coach: Bryan Harsin (2nd season; first 8 games); Cadillac Williams (interim; final 4 games)
- Offensive coordinator: Eric Kiesau (1st season; first 8 games); Ike Hilliard (interim; final 4 games)
- Offensive scheme: Pro-style, I formation
- Defensive coordinator: Jeff Schmedding (1st season)
- Base defense: 3–4
- Home stadium: Jordan-Hare Stadium

2022 Southeastern Conference football standings
	Conf.			Overall
Team	W		L	W		L
Eastern Division
No. 1 Georgia xy$#^	8	–	0	15	–	0
No. 6 Tennessee	6	–	2	11	–	2
No. 23 South Carolina	4	–	4	8	–	5
Kentucky	3	–	5	7	–	6
Florida	3	–	5	6	–	7
Missouri	3	–	5	6	–	7
Vanderbilt	2	–	6	5	–	7
Western Division
No. 16 LSU xy	6	–	2	10	–	4
No. 5 Alabama x	6	–	2	11	–	2
No. 20 Mississippi State	4	–	4	9	–	4
Ole Miss	4	–	4	8	–	5
Arkansas	3	–	5	7	–	6
Auburn	2	–	6	5	–	7
Texas A&M	2	–	6	5	–	7
Championship: Georgia 50, LSU 30
# – College Football Playoff champion; ^ – College Football Playoff participant; $ – Conference champion; x – Division champion/co-champions; y – Championship game participant; Rankings from AP Poll

The 2022 Auburn Tigers football team represented Auburn University as a member of the Western Division of the Southeastern Conference (SEC) during the 2022 NCAA Division I FBS football season. The Tigers were led by second-year head coach Bryan Harsin until his firing on October 31. Later that day, former Auburn running backs coach Cadillac Williams was appointed interim head coach for the remainder of the season. Auburn compiled an overall record of 5–7 with a mark of 2–6 in conference play, tying for fifth placed in the SEC Western Division. The team played home games at Jordan–Hare Stadium in Auburn, Alabama.

The Tigers finished with their worst record since 2012, their first time failing to qualify for a bowl game since that same year, and their first time finishing with consecutive losing records since 1998 and 1999.

== Schedule ==
Auburn and the SEC announced the 2022 football schedule on September 21, 2021.

Date	Time	Opponent	Site	TV	Result	Attendance
September 3	6:00 p.m.	No. 23 (FCS) Mercer*	Jordan–Hare Stadium; Auburn, AL	ESPN+/SECN+	W 42–16	84,562
September 10	6:30 p.m.	San Jose State*	Jordan–Hare Stadium; Auburn, AL	ESPNU	W 24–16	83,340
September 17	2:30 p.m.	No. 22 Penn State*	Jordan–Hare Stadium; Auburn, AL (SEC Nation)	CBS	L 12–41	87,451
September 24	11:00 a.m.	Missouri^{†}	Jordan–Hare Stadium; Auburn, AL	ESPN	W 17–14 ^{OT}	85,750
October 1	6:00 p.m.	LSU	Jordan–Hare Stadium; Auburn, AL (rivalry)	ESPN	L 17–21	87,451
October 8	2:30 p.m.	at No. 2 Georgia	Sanford Stadium; Athens, GA (Deep South's Oldest Rivalry)	CBS	L 10–42	92,746
October 15	11:00 a.m.	at No. 9 Ole Miss	Vaught–Hemingway Stadium; Oxford, MS (rivalry)	ESPN	L 34–48	65,243
October 29	11:00 a.m.	Arkansas	Jordan–Hare Stadium; Auburn, AL	SECN	L 27–41	83,792
November 5	6:30 p.m.	at Mississippi State	Davis Wade Stadium; Starkville, MS	ESPN2	L 33–39 ^{OT}	57,769
November 12	6:30 p.m.	Texas A&M	Jordan–Hare Stadium; Auburn, AL	SECN	W 13–10	87,451
November 19	3:00 p.m.	Western Kentucky*	Jordan–Hare Stadium; Auburn, AL	SECN	W 41–17	81,824
November 26	2:30 p.m.	at No. 7 Alabama	Bryant–Denny Stadium; Tuscaloosa, AL (Iron Bowl / SEC Nation)	CBS	L 27–49	100,077
*Non-conference game; ^{†}Homecoming; Rankings from AP Poll (and CFP Rankings, after November 1) - Released prior to game; All times are in Central time

== Game summaries ==
=== No. 23 (FCS) Mercer ===
Game One – No.23 (FCS) Mercer Bears (1–0) at Auburn Tigers (0–0)

Quarter	1	2	3	4	Total
No. 23 (FCS) Bears	0	7	0	9	16
Tigers	14	14	14	0	42

at Jordan–Hare Stadium • Auburn, Alabama

- Date: Saturday, September 3, 2022
- Game time: 6:02 p.m. CDT
- Game weather: Cloudy • Temperature: 82 °F (28 °C)
- Game attendance: 84,562
- Referee: Steve Marlowe
- TV announcers (ESPN+/SEC Network+): Mike Corey (play-by-play), Aaron Murray (analyst), Nicole Rigoni (sideline reporter)

Statistics	MER	AUB
First downs	14	22
Plays–yards	67–271	62–497
Rushes–yards	31–74	41–285
Passing yards	197	212
Passing: comp–att–int	21–36–0	13–21–2
Turnovers		
Time of possession	32:20	27:40

Team	Category	Player	Statistics
Mercer	Passing	Fred Payton	21/36, 197 yds, 2 TD
Mercer	Rushing	Austin Douglas	9 carries, 40 yds
Mercer	Receiving	Devron Harper	5 receptions, 45 yds, 2 TD
Auburn	Passing	T. J. Finley	9/14, 112 yds, 1 TD, 2 INT
Auburn	Rushing	Tank Bigsby	16 carries, 147 yds, 2 TD
Auburn	Receiving	Ja'Varrius Johnson	4 receptions, 117 yds

Scoring summary

Quarter	Time	Drive			Team	Scoring information	Score	
Quarter	Time	Plays	Yards	TOP	Team	Scoring information	Mercer	Auburn
1	9:32	11	68	5:28	AUB	Jarquez Hunter 19-yard touchdown run, Anders Carlson kick good	0	7
1	3:43	4	93	2:02	AUB	John Samuel Shenker 2-yard touchdown reception from T. J. Finley, Anders Carlson kick good	0	14
2	10:17	5	38	1:53	AUB	Jarquez Hunter 2-yard touchdown run, Anders Carlson kick good	0	21
2	5:04	8	53	3:44	AUB	Tank Bigsby 2-yard touchdown run, Anders Carlson kick good	0	28
2	0:20	9	29	1:09	MER	Devron Harper 5-yard touchdown reception from Fred Payton, Devin Folser kick good	7	28
3	4:47	7	80	2:13	AUB	Jarquez Hunter 1-yard touchdown run, Anders Carlson kick good	7	35
3	1:33	2	62	0:44	AUB	Tank Bigsby 39-yard touchdown run, Anders Carlson kick good	7	42
4	7:49	17	59	8:32	MER	33-yard field goal by Devin Folser	10	42
4	0:25	9	65	3:25	MER	Devron Harper 8-yard touchdown reception from Fred Payton, Devin Folser kick failed	16	42
"TOP" = time of possession. For other American football terms, see Glossary of American football.							16	42

=== San Jose State ===
Game Two – San Jose State Spartans (1–0) at Auburn Tigers (1–0)

Quarter	1	2	3	4	Total
Spartans	0	10	0	6	16
Tigers	0	7	10	7	24

at Jordan–Hare Stadium • Auburn, Alabama

- Date: Saturday, September 10, 2022
- Game time: 6:37 p.m. CDT
- Game weather: Cloudy • Temperature: 77 °F (25 °C)
- Game attendance: 83,340
- Referee: Ken Williamson
- TV announcers (ESPNU): Brian Custer (play-by-play), Dustin Fox (analyst), Lauren Sisler (sideline reporter)

Statistics	SJSU	AUB
First downs	21	18
Plays–yards	69–329	61–378
Rushes–yards	29–54	14–168
Passing yards	275	168
Passing: comp–att–int	24–40–0	14–23–2
Turnovers		
Time of possession	33:21	26:39

Team	Category	Player	Statistics
San Jose State	Passing	Chevan Cordeiro	24/40, 275 yds
San Jose State	Rushing	Kairee Robinson	11 carries, 24 yds, 1 TD
San Jose State	Receiving	Charles Ross	5 receptions, 89 yds
Auburn	Passing	T. J. Finley	13/20, 167 yds, 1 INT
Auburn	Rushing	Robby Ashford	7 carries, 61 yds
Auburn	Receiving	Tank Bigsby	4 receptions, 29 yds

Scoring summary

Quarter	Time	Drive			Team	Scoring information	Score	
Quarter	Time	Plays	Yards	TOP	Team	Scoring information	San Jose State	Auburn
2	11:18	7	12	3:42	SJSU	33-yard field goal by Taren Schive	3	0
2	6:31	9	75	4:47	AUB	Jarquez Hunter 7-yard touchdown run, Anders Carlson kick good	3	7
2	0:58	12	75	5:33	SJSU	Kairee Robinson 1-yard touchdown run, Taren Schive kick good	10	7
3	11:45	9	69	3:10	AUB	Tank Bigsby 1-yard touchdown run, Anders Carlson kick good	10	14
3	4:48	8	30	4:21	AUB	45-yard field goal by Anders Carlson	10	17
4	14:49	12	65	4:59	SJSU	27-yard field goal by Taren Schive	13	17
4	12:45	4	74	2:04	AUB	Tank Bigsby 4-yard touchdown run, Anders Carlson kick good	13	24
4	2:11	9	76	3:03	SJSU	37-yard field goal by Taren Schive	16	24
"TOP" = time of possession. For other American football terms, see Glossary of American football.							16	24

=== No. 22 Penn State ===
Game Three – No. 22 Penn State Nittany Lions (2–0) at Auburn Tigers (2–0)

Quarter	1	2	3	4	Total
No. 22 Nittany Lions	7	7	17	10	41
Tigers	3	3	0	6	12

at Jordan–Hare Stadium • Auburn, Alabama

- Date: Saturday, September 17, 2022
- Game time: 2:39 p.m. CDT
- Game weather: Sunny • Temperature: 84 °F (29 °C)
- Game attendance: 87,451
- Referee: Mike Cannon
- TV announcers (CBS): Brad Nessler (play-by-play), Gary Danielson (analyst), Jenny Dell (sideline reporter)

Statistics	PSU	AUB
First downs	18	23
Plays–yards	62–477	74–415
Rushes–yards	39–245	36–119
Passing yards	296	232
Passing: comp–att–int	17–23–0	21–38–2
Turnovers		
Time of possession	30:22	29:38

Team	Category	Player	Statistics
Penn State	Passing	Sean Clifford	14/19, 178 yards
Penn State	Rushing	Nicholas Singleton	10 carries, 124 yards, 2 TD
Penn State	Receiving	Brenton Strange	6 receptions, 80 yards
Auburn	Passing	T. J. Finley	11/19, 152 yards, 1 INT
Auburn	Rushing	Tank Bigsby	9 carries, 39 yards
Auburn	Receiving	Shedrick Jackson	4 receptions, 76 yards

Scoring summary

Quarter	Time	Drive			Team	Scoring information	Score	
Quarter	Time	Plays	Yards	TOP	Team	Scoring information	Penn State	Auburn
"TOP" = time of possession. For other American football terms, see Glossary of American football.								

=== Missouri ===
Game Four – Missouri Tigers (2–1) at Auburn Tigers (2–1)

Quarter	1	2	3	4	OT	Total
Missouri Tigers	0	14	0	0	0	14
Auburn Tigers	14	0	0	0	3	17

at Jordan–Hare Stadium • Auburn, Alabama

- Date: Saturday, September 24, 2022
- Game time: 11:07 a.m. CDT
- Game weather: Sunny • Temperature: 76 °F (24 °C) • Wind: SE 4 mph
- Game attendance: 85,750
- Referee: Jason Autrey
- TV announcers (ESPN): Mark Jones (play-by-play), Robert Griffin III (analyst), Quint Kessenich (sideline reporter)

Statistics	MU	AUB
First downs	13	15
Plays–yards	63–312	66–217
Rushes–yards	39–133	45–82
Passing yards	179	135
Passing: comp–att–int	14–24–1	14–21–0
Turnovers		
Time of possession	27:18	32:42

Team	Category	Player	Statistics
Missouri	Passing	Brady Cook	14/24, 179 yds, 1 INT
Missouri	Rushing	Nathaniel Peat	20 carries, 110 yds
Missouri	Receiving	Dominic Lovett	5 receptions, 102 yds
Auburn	Passing	Robby Ashford	12/18, 127 yds
Auburn	Rushing	Robby Ashford	15 carries, 46 yds
Auburn	Receiving	Koy Moore	4 receptions, 74 yds

Scoring summary

Quarter	Time	Drive			Team	Scoring information	Score	
Quarter	Time	Plays	Yards	TOP	Team	Scoring information	Missouri	Auburn
"TOP" = time of possession. For other American football terms, see Glossary of American football.								

=== LSU ===
Game Five – LSU Tigers (3–1) at Auburn Tigers (3–1)

Quarter	1	2	3	4	Total
LSU Tigers	0	14	7	0	21
Auburn Tigers	7	10	0	0	17

at Jordan–Hare Stadium • Auburn, Alabama

- Date: Saturday, October 1, 2022
- Game time: 6:00 p.m. CDT
- Game weather: Clear
- Game attendance: 87,451
- Referee: Lee Hedrick
- TV announcers (ESPN): Joe Tessitore (play-by-play), Greg McElroy (analyst), Katie George (sideline reporter)

Statistics	LSU	AUB
First downs	19	20
Plays–yards	75–270	70–438
Rushes–yards	49–185	31–101
Passing yards	85	337
Passing: comp–att–int	10–26–0	19–39–2
Turnovers		
Time of possession	29:07	30:53

Team	Category	Player	Statistics
LSU	Passing	Jayden Daniels	8/20, 80 yards
LSU	Rushing	Josh Williams	17 carries, 68 yards
LSU	Receiving	John Emery Jr.	1 reception, 39 yards
Auburn	Passing	Robby Ashford	19/38, 337 yards, 2 TD, 1 INT
Auburn	Rushing	Tank Bigsby	12 carries, 45 yards
Auburn	Receiving	Ja'Varrius Johnson	3 receptions, 74 yards, 1 TD

Scoring summary

Quarter	Time	Drive			Team	Scoring information	Score	
Quarter	Time	Plays	Yards	TOP	Team	Scoring information	LSU	Auburn
1	12:57	6	69	2:03	AUB	Ja'Varrius Johnson 53-yard pass from Robby Anderson, Anders Carlson kick good	0	7
2	14:04	6	99	2:56	AUB	Camden Brown 52-yard pass from Robby Anderson, Anders Carlson kick good	0	14
2	9:38	7	48	2:32	AUB	29-yard field goal by Anders Carlson	0	17
2	6:33				LSU	Jay Ward 23-yard fumble return, Damian Ramos kick good	7	17
2	0:15	11	77	1:41	LSU	Jayden Daniels 1-yard touchdown run, Damian Ramos kick good	14	17
3	3:32	7	63	3:34	LSU	John Emery Jr. 20-yard touchdown run, Damian Ramos kick good	21	17
"TOP" = time of possession. For other American football terms, see Glossary of American football.							21	17

=== At No. 2 Georgia ===
Game Six – Auburn Tigers (3–2) at No. 2 Georgia Bulldogs (5–0)

Quarter	1	2	3	4	Total
Tigers	0	0	3	7	10
No. 2 Bulldogs	0	14	7	21	42

at Sanford Stadium • Athens, Georgia

- Date: Saturday, October 8, 2022
- Game time: 2:38 p.m. CDT
- Game weather: Clear • Temperature: 77 °F (25 °C) • Wind: N 3 mph
- Game attendance: 92,746
- Referee: James Carter
- TV announcers (CBS): Tom McCarthy (play-by-play), Rick Neuheisel (analyst), Sheree Burruss (sideline reporter)

Statistics	AUB	UGA
First downs	10	22
Plays–yards	63–258	71–500
Rushes–yards	25–93	39–292
Passing yards	165	208
Passing: comp–att–int	13–38–0	22–32–0
Turnovers		
Time of possession	24:31	35:29

Team	Category	Player	Statistics
Auburn	Passing	Robby Ashford	13/38, 165 yards, 1 TD
Auburn	Rushing	Robby Ashford	9 carries, 52 yards
Auburn	Receiving	Jarquez Hunter	3 receptions, 73 yards, 1 TD
Georgia	Passing	Stetson Bennett	22/32, 208 yards
Georgia	Rushing	Branson Robinson	12 carries, 98 yards, 1 TD
Georgia	Receiving	Ladd McConkey	5 receptions, 47 yards

Scoring summary

Quarter	Time	Drive			Team	Scoring information	Score	
Quarter	Time	Plays	Yards	TOP	Team	Scoring information	Auburn	Georgia
"TOP" = time of possession. For other American football terms, see Glossary of American football.								

=== At No. 9 Ole Miss ===
Game Seven – Auburn Tigers (3–3) at No. 9 Ole Miss Rebels (6–0)

Quarter	1	2	3	4	Total
Tigers	0	17	14	3	34
No. 9 Rebels	14	14	10	10	48

at Vaught–Hemingway Stadium • Oxford, Mississippi

- Date: Saturday, October 15, 2022
- Game time: 11:07 a.m. CDT
- Game weather: Sunny • Temperature: 64 °F (18 °C) • Wind: SW 6 mph
- Game attendance: 65,243
- Referee: Ken Williamson
- TV announcers (ESPN): Bob Wischusen (play-by-play), Dan Orlovsky (analyst), Kris Budden (sideline reporter)

Statistics	AUB	MISS
First downs	18	29
Plays–yards	65-441	88-578
Rushes–yards	48-301	69-448
Passing yards	140	130
Passing: comp–att–int	8-17	9-19
Turnovers		
Time of possession	30:27	29:33

Team	Category	Player	Statistics
Auburn	Passing	Robby Ashford	8/17, 140 yards, 2 INT
Auburn	Rushing	Tank Bigsby	20 carries, 179 yards, 2 TD
Auburn	Receiving	Koy Moore	1 reception, 46 yards
Ole Miss	Passing	Jaxson Dart	9/19, 130 yards, 3 TD, 1 INT
Ole Miss	Rushing	Quinshon Judkins	25 carries, 139 yards, 2 TD
Ole Miss	Receiving	Dayton Wade	2 receptions, 44 yards, 1 TD

Scoring summary

Quarter	Time	Drive			Team	Scoring information	Score	
Quarter	Time	Plays	Yards	TOP	Team	Scoring information	Auburn	Ole Miss
"TOP" = time of possession. For other American football terms, see Glossary of American football.								

=== Arkansas ===
Game Eight – Arkansas Razorbacks (4–3) at Auburn Tigers (3–4)

Quarter	1	2	3	4	Total
Razorbacks	7	10	14	10	41
Tigers	3	10	0	14	27

at Jordan–Hare Stadium • Auburn, Alabama

- Date: Saturday, October 29, 2022
- Game time: 11:03 a.m. CDT
- Game weather: Cloudy • Temperature: 64 °F (18 °C) • Wind: 10 mph E
- Game attendance: 83,792
- Referee: Steve Marlowe
- TV announcers (SEC Network): Dave Neal (play-by-play), Deuce McAllister (analyst), Andraya Carter (sideline reporter)

Statistics	ARK	AUB
First downs	23	20
Plays–yards	72-520	71-468
Rushes–yards	47-276	38-183
Passing yards	244	285
Passing: comp–att–int	17-25	24-33
Turnovers		
Time of possession	29:50	30:10

Team	Category	Player	Statistics
Arkansas	Passing	KJ Jefferson	16/24, 234 yards, 1 TD
Arkansas	Rushing	Raheim Sanders	16 carries, 171 yards
Arkansas	Receiving	Matt Landers	4 receptions, 115 yards
Auburn	Passing	Robby Ashford	24/33, 285 yards, 1 TD
Auburn	Rushing	Robby Ashford	19 carries, 87 yards
Auburn	Receiving	Camden Brown	4 receptions, 83 yards, 1 TD

Scoring summary

Quarter	Time	Drive			Team	Scoring information	Score	
Quarter	Time	Plays	Yards	TOP	Team	Scoring information	Arkansas	Auburn
1	5:55	7	18	3:12	AUB	46-yard field goal by Anders Carlson	0	3
1	3:10	8	75	2:45	ARK	KJ Jefferson 1-yard touchdown run, Cam Little kick good	7	3
2	10:27	11	80	4:52	ARK	KJ Jefferson 13-yard touchdown run, Cam Little kick good	14	3
2	3:43	5	93	1:35	AUB	Tank Bigsby 41-yard touchdown run, Anders Carlson kick good	14	10
2	2:25	5	56	1:18	ARK	27-yard field goal by Cam Little	17	10
2	0:03	7	52	0:47	AUB	24-yard field goal by Anders Carlson	17	13
3	6:02	9	64	2:35	ARK	Jadon Haselwood 11-yard pass from KJ Jefferson, Cam Little kick good	24	13
3	0:44	7	94	3:26	ARK	Rashod Dubinion 2-yard touchdown run, Cam Little kick good	31	13
4	7:35	10	84	6:38	ARK	Rashod Dubinion 2-yard touchdown run, Cam Little kick good	38	13
4	5:28	7	75	2:07	AUB	Camden Brown 9-yard pass from Robby Ashford, Anders Carlson kick good	38	20
4	1:55	8	23	3:27	ARK	37-yard field goal by Cam Little	41	20
4	0:04	7	75	1:51	AUB	Jarquez Hunter 1-yard touchdown run, Anders Carlson kick good	41	27
"TOP" = time of possession. For other American football terms, see Glossary of American football.							41	27

=== At Mississippi State ===
Game Nine – Auburn Tigers (3–5) at Mississippi State Bulldogs (5–3)

Quarter	1	2	3	4	OT	Total
Tigers	0	6	13	14	0	33
Bulldogs	10	14	0	9	6	39

at Davis Wade Stadium • Starkville, Mississippi

- Date: Saturday, November 5, 2022
- Game time: 6:30 p.m. CDT
- Game weather: Rain • Temperature: 65 °F (18 °C) • Wind: 8 mph SE
- Game attendance: 57,769
- Referee: Lee Hedrick
- TV announcers (ESPN2): Tom Hart (play-by-play), Jordan Rodgers (analyst), Cole Cubelic (sideline reporter)

Statistics	AUB	MSU
First downs		
Plays–yards		
Rushes–yards		
Passing yards		
Passing: comp–att–int		
Turnovers		
Time of possession		

Team	Category	Player	Statistics
Auburn	Passing	Robby Ashford	7/22, 75 yards
Auburn	Rushing	Robby Ashford	18 carries, 108 yards, 2 TD
Auburn	Receiving	Ja'Varrius Johnson	1 reception, 29 yards
Mississippi State	Passing	Will Rogers	42/59, 357 yards, 3 TD, 1 INT
Mississippi State	Rushing	Jo'Quavious Marks	7 carries, 45 yards, 1 TD
Mississippi State	Receiving	RaRa Thomas	6 receptions, 84 yards, 2 TD

Scoring summary

Quarter	Time	Drive			Team	Scoring information	Score	
Quarter	Time	Plays	Yards	TOP	Team	Scoring information	Auburn	Mississippi State
"TOP" = time of possession. For other American football terms, see Glossary of American football.								

=== Texas A&M ===
Game Ten – Texas A&M Aggies (3–6) at Auburn Tigers (3–6)

Quarter	1	2	3	4	Total
Aggies	0	0	0	10	10
Tigers	7	0	3	3	13

at Jordan–Hare Stadium • Auburn, Alabama

- Date: Saturday, November 12, 2022
- Game time: 6:39 p.m. CST
- Game weather: Cloudy • Temperature: 53 °F (12 °C) • Wind: 11 mph NW
- Game attendance: 87,451
- Referee: David Smith
- TV announcers (SEC Network): Tom Hart (play-by-play), Jordan Rogers (analyst), Cole Cubelic (sideline reporter)

Statistics	TA&M	AUB
First downs	12	18
Plays–yards	215	330
Rushes–yards	94	270
Passing yards	121	60
Passing: comp–att–int	1	3
Turnovers		
Time of possession	23:34	36:26

Team	Category	Player	Statistics
Texas A&M	Passing	Conner Weigman	14/36, 121 yards, 1 TD
Texas A&M	Rushing	Amari Daniels	11 carries, 83 yards
Texas A&M	Receiving	Jalen Preston	3 receptions, 43 yards, 1 TD
Auburn	Passing	Robby Ashford	6/13, 60 yards, 1 TD, 2 INT
Auburn	Rushing	Tank Bigsby	23 carries, 121 yards
Auburn	Receiving	Tank Bigsby	2 receptions, 20 yards

Scoring summary

Quarter	Time	Drive			Team	Scoring information	Score	
Quarter	Time	Plays	Yards	TOP	Team	Scoring information	Texas A&M	Auburn
"TOP" = time of possession. For other American football terms, see Glossary of American football.								

=== Western Kentucky ===
Game Eleven – Western Kentucky Hilltoppers (7−4) at Auburn Tigers (4−6)

Quarter	1	2	3	4	Total
Hilltoppers	0	17	0	0	17
Tigers	10	7	10	14	41

at Jordan–Hare Stadium • Auburn, Alabama

- Date: Saturday, November 19, 2022
- Game time: 3:01 p.m. CST
- Game weather: Cloudy • Temperature: 55 °F (13 °C) • Wind: 6 mph NW
- Game attendance: 81,824
- Referee: Scott Walker
- TV announcers (SEC Network): Dave Neal (play-by-play), Deuce McAllister (analyst), Andraya Carter (sideline reporter)

Statistics	WKU	AUB
First downs		
Plays–yards		
Rushes–yards		
Passing yards		
Passing: comp–att–int		
Turnovers		
Time of possession		

Team	Category	Player	Statistics
Western Kentucky	Passing	Austin Reed	26/55, 289 yards, 2 TD, 2 INT
Western Kentucky	Rushing	Markese Stepp	7 carries, 33 yards
Western Kentucky	Receiving	Malachi Corley	12 receptions, 99 yards
Auburn	Passing	Jarquez Hunter	1/1, 20 yards, 1 TD
Auburn	Rushing	Tank Bigsby	18 carries, 110 yards, 2 TD
Auburn	Receiving	Koy Moore	2 receptions, 31 yards, 1 TD

Scoring summary

Quarter	Time	Drive			Team	Scoring information	Score	
Quarter	Time	Plays	Yards	TOP	Team	Scoring information	Western Kentucky	Auburn
"TOP" = time of possession. For other American football terms, see Glossary of American football.								

=== At No. 7 Alabama ===
Game Twelve – Auburn Tigers (5–6) at No. 7 Alabama Crimson Tide (9–2)

Quarter	1	2	3	4	Total
Tigers	7	7	7	6	27
No. 7 Crimson Tide	14	21	7	7	49

at Bryant–Denny Stadium • Tuscaloosa, Alabama

- Date: Saturday, November 26, 2022
- Game time: 2:39 p.m. CST
- Game attendance: 100,077
- Referee: Ken Williamson
- TV announcers (CBS): Brad Nessler (play-by-play), Gary Danielson (analyst), Jenny Dell (sideline reporter)

Statistics	AUB	ALA
First downs	21	26
Plays–yards	395	516
Rushes–yards	318	173
Passing yards	77	343
Passing: comp–att–int	2	1
Turnovers		
Time of possession	31:10	28:50

Team	Category	Player	Statistics
Auburn	Passing	Robby Ashford	11/23, 77 yards, 1 TD
Auburn	Rushing	Jarquez Hunter	11 carries, 134 yards
Auburn	Receiving	Shedrick Jackson	2 receptions, 26 yards
Alabama	Passing	Bryce Young	20/30, 343 yards, 3 TD, 1 INT
Alabama	Rushing	Jahmyr Gibbs	17 carries, 76 yards, 1 TD
Alabama	Receiving	Jermaine Burton	3 receptions, 87 yards

Scoring summary

Quarter	Time	Drive			Team	Scoring information	Score	
Quarter	Time	Plays	Yards	TOP	Team	Scoring information	AUB	ALA
1st	11:11	6	80	3:10	AUB	Robby Ashford (#9) 24-yard touchdown run, Alex McPherson (#38) kick good	7	0
1st	6:25	5	62	2:06	ALA	Bryce Young (#9) 5-yard touchdown run, Will Reichard (#16) kick good	7	7
1st	1:37	8	65	2:52	ALA	Jase McClellan (#2) 10-yard touchdown reception from Bryce Young (#9), Will Reichard (#16) kick good	7	14
2nd	14:56	4	48	1:00	ALA	Roydell Williams (#5) 5-yard touchdown run, Will Reichard (#16) kick good	7	21
2nd	9:34	10	75	5:22	AUB	Ja'Varrius Johnson (#6) 20-yard touchdown reception from Robby Ashford, Alex McPherson (#38) kick good	14	21
2nd	5:39	8	93	3:55	ALA	Ja'Corey Brooks (#7) 33-yard touchdown reception from Bryce Young (#9), Will Reichard (#16) kick good	14	28
2nd	0:54	4	37	1:53	ALA	Traeshon Holden (#11) 27-yard touchdown reception from Bryce Young (#9), Will Reichard (#16) kick good	14	35
3rd	9:57	9	72	5:03	ALA	Jase McClellan (#2) 2-yard touchdown run, Will Reichard (#16) kick good	14	42
3rd	6:39	7	75	3:19	AUB	Robby Ashford (#9) 14-yard touchdown run, Alex McPherson (#38) kick good	21	42
4th	12:18	15	64	7:02	AUB	32-yard field goal by Alex McPherson (#38)	24	42
4th	2:08	10	60	4:28	AUB	39-yard field goal by Alex McPherson (#38)	27	42
4th	1:48	2	27	0:20	ALA	Jahymr Gibbs (#1) 23-yard touchdown run, Will Reichard (#16) kick good	27	49
"TOP" = time of possession. For other American football terms, see Glossary of American football.							AUB 27	ALA 49

== Coaching staff ==
Name	Position	Consecutive season at Auburn
Bryan Harsin	Head coach	2nd
Eric Kiesau	Offensive coordinator/quarterbacks	2nd
Jeff Schmedding	Defensive coordinator	2nd
Brad Bedell	Tight ends coach	2nd
Ike Hilliard	Wide receivers coach	1st
Will Friend	Offensive line coach	2nd
Cadillac Williams	Running backs coach / interim head coach (after Brian Harsin was fired)	4th
Jimmy Brumbaugh	Defensive line coach	1st
Christian Robinson	Linebackers coach/run game coordinator	1st
Roc Bellantoni	Special team/outside linebackers coach	2nd
Zac Etheridge	Defensive backs coach/associate head coach	2nd

== Players drafted into the NFL ==
Auburn had five players selected in the 2023 NFL draft.

Round	Pick	Player	Position	NFL club
2	37	Derick Hall	OLB	Seattle Seahawks
3	88	Tank Bigsby	RB	Jacksonville Jaguars
4	116	Colby Wooden	DT	Green Bay Packers
5	168	Owen Pappoe	LB	Arizona Cardinals
6	207	Anders Carlson	K	Green Bay Packers
