= 2022 Arkansas Razorbacks football team =

American college football season

2022 Arkansas Razorbacks football

Liberty Bowl champion

Liberty Bowl, W 55–53^{3OT} vs. Kansas
- Conference: Southeastern Conference
- Western Division
- Record: 7–6 (3–5 SEC)
- Head coach: Sam Pittman (3rd season)
- Offensive coordinator: Kendal Briles (3rd season)
- Offensive scheme: Hurry-up, no-huddle spread
- Defensive coordinator: Barry Odom (3rd season)
- Base defense: 3–2–6
- Captains: Simeon Blair; Jalen Catalon; KJ Jefferson; Bumper Pool; Dalton Wagner
- Home stadium: Donald W. Reynolds Razorback Stadium

2022 Southeastern Conference football standings
	Conf.			Overall
Team	W		L	W		L
Eastern Division
No. 1 Georgia xy$#^	8	–	0	15	–	0
No. 6 Tennessee	6	–	2	11	–	2
No. 23 South Carolina	4	–	4	8	–	5
Kentucky	3	–	5	7	–	6
Florida	3	–	5	6	–	7
Missouri	3	–	5	6	–	7
Vanderbilt	2	–	6	5	–	7
Western Division
No. 16 LSU xy	6	–	2	10	–	4
No. 5 Alabama x	6	–	2	11	–	2
No. 20 Mississippi State	4	–	4	9	–	4
Ole Miss	4	–	4	8	–	5
Arkansas	3	–	5	7	–	6
Auburn	2	–	6	5	–	7
Texas A&M	2	–	6	5	–	7
Championship: Georgia 50, LSU 30
# – College Football Playoff champion; ^ – College Football Playoff participant; $ – Conference champion; x – Division champion/co-champions; y – Championship game participant; Rankings from AP Poll

The 2022 Arkansas Razorbacks football team represented the University of Arkansas as a member of the Southeastern Conference (SEC) during the 2022 NCAA Division I FBS football season. Led by third-year head coach Sam Pittman, the Razorbacks compiled an overall record of 7–6 with a mark of 3–5 in conference play, placing fifth in the SEC's Western Division. Arkansas was invited to the Liberty Bowl, where the Razorbacks defeated Kansas in three overtimes. The team played home games at Donald W. Reynolds Razorback Stadium in Fayetteville, Arkansas.

Arkansas won a bowl game in consecutive seasons for only the second time in program history, repeating the feat achieved by the 2014 and 2015 teams.

== Schedule ==
Arkansas and the SEC announced the 2022 football schedule on September 21, 2021.

Date	Time	Opponent	Rank	Site	TV	Result	Attendance
September 3	2:30 p.m.	No. 23 Cincinnati*	No. 19	Donald W. Reynolds Razorback Stadium; Fayetteville, AR (SEC Nation)	ESPN	W 31–24	74,751
September 10	11:00 a.m.	South Carolina	No. 16	Donald W. Reynolds Razorback Stadium; Fayetteville, AR	ESPN	W 44–30	72,437
September 17	6:00 p.m.	No. 5 (FCS) Missouri State*	No. 10	Donald W. Reynolds Razorback Stadium; Fayetteville, AR	SECN+, ESPN+	W 38–27	74,133
September 24	6:00 p.m.	vs. No. 23 Texas A&M	No. 10	AT&T Stadium; Arlington, TX (rivalry, SEC Nation)	ESPN	L 21–23	63,580
October 1	2:30 p.m.	No. 2 Alabama	No. 20	Donald W. Reynolds Razorback Stadium; Fayetteville, AR	CBS	L 26–49	75,579
October 8	11:00 a.m.	at No. 23 Mississippi State		Davis Wade Stadium; Starkville, MS (SEC Nation)	SECN	L 17–40	57,849
October 15	2:30 p.m.	at BYU*		LaVell Edwards Stadium; Provo, UT	ESPN	W 52–35	63,470
October 29	11:00 a.m.	at Auburn		Jordan–Hare Stadium; Auburn, AL	SECN	W 41–27	83,792
November 5	3:00 p.m.	Liberty*^{†}		Donald W. Reynolds Razorback Stadium; Fayetteville, AR	SECN	L 19–21	70,072
November 12	11:00 a.m.	No. 7 LSU		Donald W. Reynolds Razorback Stadium; Fayetteville, AR (rivalry)	ESPN	L 10–13	73,750
November 19	6:30 p.m.	No. 14 Ole Miss		Donald W. Reynolds Razorback Stadium; Fayetteville, AR (rivalry)	SECN	W 42–27	71,365
November 25	2:30 p.m.	at Missouri		Faurot Field; Columbia, MO (rivalry)	CBS	L 27–29	55,710
December 28	4:30 p.m.	vs. Kansas*		Simmons Bank Liberty Stadium; Memphis, TN (Liberty Bowl)	ESPN	W 55–53 ^{3OT}	52,847
*Non-conference game; ^{†}Homecoming; Rankings from AP Poll (and CFP Rankings, after November 1) - Released prior to game; All times are in Central time

== Rankings ==
Ranking movements Legend: ██ Increase in ranking ██ Decrease in ranking — = Not ranked RV = Received votes
	Week															
Poll	Pre	1	2	3	4	5	6	7	8	9	10	11	12	13	14	Final
AP	19	16	10	10	20	RV	—	RV	RV	RV	—	—	RV	—	—	—
Coaches	23	17	11	10	19	25	—	RV	RV	RV	—	—	—	—	—	—
CFP	Not released									—	—	—	—	—	—	Not released

== Game summaries ==
=== No. 23 Cincinnati ===
Uniform Combination
Helmet	Jersey	Pants

Game One – No. 23 Cincinnati Bearcats at No. 19 Arkansas Razorbacks

Quarter	1	2	3	4	Total
No. 23 Bearcats	0	0	17	7	24
No. 19 Razorbacks	7	7	10	7	31

at Donald W. Reynolds Razorback Stadium • Fayetteville, Arkansas

- Date: Saturday, September 3, 2022
- Game time: 2:30 p.m. CST
- Game weather: Sunny • Temperature: 82 °F (28 °C) • Wind: SW 6 mph
- Game attendance: 74,751
- Referee: Jason Autrey
- TV announcers (ESPN): Dave Flemming (play-by-play), Rod Gilmore (analyst), and Tiffany Blackmon (sideline)
- ESPN

Game information

First quarter

- (6:18) Arkansas – KJ Jefferson 15 yard rush, Cam Little kick (Drive: 3 plays, 29 yards, 0:55; Arkansas 7–0)

Second quarter

- (0:17) Arkansas – Trey Knox 5 yard pass from KJ Jefferson, Cam Little kick (Drive: 7 plays, 70 yards, 0:57; Arkansas 14–0)

Third quarter

- (10:59) Cincinnati – Corey Kiner 5 yard rush, Ryan Coe kick (Drive: 12 plays, 75 yards, 4:01; Arkansas 14–7)
- (8:00) Arkansas – Jadon Haselwood 19 yard pass from KJ Jefferson, Cam Little kick (Drive: 8 plays, 75 yards, 2:59; Arkansas 21–7)
- (6:50) Cincinnati – Nick Mardner 35 yard pass from Ben Bryant, Ryan Coe kick (Drive: 3 plays, 71 yards, 1:02; Arkansas 21–14)
- (4:44) Cincinnati – Ryan Coe 26 yard field goal (Drive: 4 plays, −5 yards, 1:54; Arkansas 21–17)
- (1:28) Arkansas – Cam Little 32 yard field goal (Drive: 11 plays, 61 yards, 3:16; Arkansas 24–17)

Fourth quarter

- (9:26) Arkansas – Trey Knox 32 yard pass from KJ Jefferson, Cam Little kick (Drive: 2 plays, 49 yards, 0:26; Arkansas 31–17)
- (5:49) Cincinnati – Leonard Taylor 15 yard pass from Ben Bryant, Ryan Coe kick (Drive: 9 plays, 75 yards, 3:37; Arkansas 31–24)

Statistics	CIN	ARK
First downs	23	23
Plays–yards	74–436	71–447
Rushes–yards	31–111	45–224
Passing yards	325	223
Passing: comp–att–int	26–43–1	18–26–0
Turnovers		
Time of possession	31:24	28:36

Team	Category	Player	Statistics
Cincinnati	Passing	Ben Bryant	26–43, 325 yards, 2 TD, 1 INT
Cincinnati	Rushing	Corey Kiner	12 carries, 59 yards, 1 TD
Cincinnati	Receiving	Tyler Scott	5 receptions, 77 yards
Arkansas	Passing	KJ Jefferson	18–26, 223 yards, 3 TD
Arkansas	Rushing	Raheim Sanders	20 carries, 117 yards
Arkansas	Receiving	Trey Knox	6 receptions, 75 yards, 2 TD

=== South Carolina ===
Uniform Combination
Helmet	Jersey	Pants

Game Two – South Carolina Gamecocks (1–0) at No. 16 Arkansas Razorbacks (1–0)

Quarter	1	2	3	4	Total
Gamecocks	3	6	7	14	30
No. 16 Razorbacks	7	14	0	23	44

at Donald W. Reynolds Razorback Stadium • Fayetteville, Arkansas

- Date: Saturday, September 10, 2022
- Game time: 11:00 a.m. CST
- Game weather: Sunny • Temperature: 75 °F (24 °C) • Wind: SW 3 mph
- Game attendance: 72,437
- Referee: David Smith
- TV announcers (ESPN): Bob Wischusen (play-by-play), Dan Orlovsky (analyst), Kris Budden (sideline)
- Game summary: ESPN

Game information

First quarter

- (6:42) Arkansas – Raheim Sanders 1 yard rush, Cam Little kick (Drive: 13 plays, 63 yards, 5:38; Arkansas 7–0)
- (3:32) South Carolina – Mitch Jeter 28 yard field goal (Drive: 6 plays, 65 yards, 3:10; Arkansas 7–3)

Second quarter

- (14:28) Arkansas – Raheim Sanders 11 yard rush, Cam Little kick (Drive: 12 plays, 75 yards, 4:04; Arkansas 14–3)
- (8:13) Arkansas – Rashod Dubinion 1 yard rush, Cam Little kick (Drive: 12 plays, 61 yards, 4:53; Arkansas 21–3)
- (2:56) South Carolina – MarShawn Lloyd 7 yard rush, Mitch Jeter kick no good (Drive: 11 plays, 70 yards, 5:17; Arkansas 21–9)

Third quarter

- (8:51) South Carolina – Antwane Wells 62 yard pass from Spencer Rattler, Mitch Jeter kick (Drive: 8 plays, 88 yards, 2:55; Arkansas 21–16)

Fourth quarter

- (14:55) Arkansas – KJ Jefferson 2 yard rush, Cam Little kick (Drive: 14 plays, 59 yards, 5:17; Arkansas 28–16)
- (12:09) Arkansas – KJ Jefferson 23 yard pass from Warren Thompson, Cam Little kick (Drive: 5 plays, 41 yards, 1:57; Arkansas 35–16)
- (6:25) South Carolina – Juju McDowell 1 yard rush, 2-point pass good (Spencer Rattler to Ahmarean Brown) (Drive: 3 plays, 76 yards, 1:14; Arkansas 35–24)
- (6:00) Arkansas – A.J. Green 1 yard rush, Cam Little kick (Drive: 2 plays, 9 yards, 0:25; Arkansas 42–24)
- (3:21) South Carolina – Jaheim Bell 1 yard rush, 2-point failed (Drive: 10 plays, 75 yards, 2:39; Arkansas 42–30)
- (1:33) Arkansas – Spencer Rattler committed intentional grounding in end zone, safety (Arkansas 44–30)

Statistics	SC	ARK
First downs	22	27
Plays–yards	67–411	86–457
Rushes–yards	29–40	65–295
Passing yards	371	162
Passing: comp–att–int	23–38–1	18–21–0
Turnovers		
Time of possession	25:23	34:37

Team	Category	Player	Statistics
South Carolina	Passing	Spencer Rattler	23–38, 371 yards, 1 TD, 1 INT
South Carolina	Rushing	Juju McDowell	6 carries, 35 yards, 1 TD
South Carolina	Receiving	Antwane Wells Jr.	8 receptions, 185 yards, 1 TD
Arkansas	Passing	KJ Jefferson	18–21, 162 yards, 1 TD
Arkansas	Rushing	Raheim Sanders	24 carries, 156 yards, 2 TD
Arkansas	Receiving	Matt Landers	4 receptions, 45 yards

=== No. 5 (FCS) Missouri State ===
Uniform Combination
Helmet	Jersey	Pants

Game Three – No. 5 (FCS) Missouri State Bears (2–0) at No. 10 Arkansas Razorbacks (2–0)

Quarter	1	2	3	4	Total
No. 5 (FCS) Bears	7	10	7	3	27
No. 10 Razorbacks	0	14	3	21	38

at Donald W. Reynolds Razorback Stadium • Fayetteville, Arkansas

- Date: Saturday, September 17, 2022
- Game time: 6:00 p.m. CST
- Game weather: Sunny • Temperature: 88 °F (31 °C) • Wind: SSE 9 mph
- Game attendance: 74,133
- Referee: Lee Hedrick
- TV announcers (SEC Network+/ESPN+): Jay Alter (play-by-play), Brian Kinchen (analyst), Tera Talmadge (sideline)
- ESPN

Game information

First quarter

- (2:47) Missouri State – Jacardia Wright 1 yard rush, Jose Pizano kick (Drive: 12 plays, 64 yards, 5:30; Missouri State 7–0)

Second quarter

- (13:29) Missouri State – Jose Pizano 28 yard field goal (Drive: 7 plays, 69 yards, 2:11; Missouri State 10–0)
- (10:36) Missouri State – Jason Shelley 24 yard rush, Jose Pizano kick (Drive: 4 plays, 45 yards, 1:32; Missouri State 17–0)
- (8:25) Arkansas – Raheim Sanders 3 yard rush, Cam Little kick (Drive: 8 plays, 75 yards, 2:11; Missouri State 17–7)
- (1:04) Arkansas – Jaden Haselwood 38 yard pass from KJ Jefferson, Cam Little kick (Drive: 2 plays, 85 yards, 0:16; Missouri State 17–14)

Third quarter

- (5:36) Arkansas – Cam Little 27 yard field goal (Drive: 14 plays, 84 yards, 4:28; Tied 17–17)
- (3:28) Missouri State – Tyrone Scott 47 yard pass from Jason Shelley, Jose Pizano kick (Drive: 5 plays, 75 yards, 2:08; Missouri State 24–17)

Fourth quarter

- (12:04) Missouri State – Jose Pizano 31 yard field goal (Drive: 10 plays, 71 yards, 4:58; Missouri State 27–17)
- (11:38) Arkansas – Raheim Sanders 73 yard pass from KJ Jefferson, Cam Little kick (Drive: 2 plays, 75 yards, 0:26; Missouri State 27–24)
- (9:16) Arkansas – Bryce Stephens 82 yard punt return, Cam Little kick (Arkansas 31–27)
- (1:39) Arkansas – KJ Jefferson 1 yard rush, Cam Little kick (Drive: 9 plays, 80 yards, 5:11; Arkansas 38–27)

Statistics	MSU	ARK
First downs	21	22
Plays–yards	75–409	67–597
Rushes–yards	32–52	36–212
Passing yards	357	385
Passing: comp–att–int	24–43–0	19–31–1
Turnovers		
Time of possession	35:51	24:09

Team	Category	Player	Statistics
Missouri State	Passing	Jason Shelley	24–43, 357 yards, 1 TD
Missouri State	Rushing	Jacardia Wright	14 carries, 37 yards, 1 TD
Missouri State	Receiving	Kevon Latulas	5 receptions, 71 yards
Arkansas	Passing	KJ Jefferson	19–31, 385 yards, 2 TD, 1 INT
Arkansas	Rushing	Raheim Sanders	22 carries, 167 yards, 1 TD
Arkansas	Receiving	Matt Landers	7 receptions, 123 yards

=== Vs. No. 23 Texas A&M ===
Uniform Combination
Helmet	Jersey	Pants

Game Four – No. 10 Arkansas Razorbacks (3–0) vs. No. 23 Texas A&M Aggies (2–1)

Quarter	1	2	3	4	Total
No. 10 Razorbacks	14	0	0	7	21
No. 23 Aggies	0	13	10	0	23

at AT&T Stadium • Arlington, Texas

- Date: Saturday, September 24, 2022
- Game time: 6:00 p.m. CST
- Game weather: n/a (game played indoors)
- Game attendance: 63,580
- Referee: Ken Williamson
- TV announcers (ESPN): Joe Tessitore (play-by-play), Greg McElroy (analyst), Katie George (sideline)
- ESPN

Game information

First quarter

- (9:44) Arkansas – Ketron Jackson Jr. 32 yard pass from KJ Jefferson, Cam Little kick (Drive: 5 plays, 69 yards, 1:43; Arkansas 7–0)
- (5:25) Arkansas – Warren Thompson 56 yard pass from KJ Jefferson, Cam Little kick (Drive: 7 plays, 78 yards, 2:07; Arkansas 14–0)

Second quarter

- (8:45) Texas A&M – Evan Stewart 10 yard pass from Max Johnson, Randy Bond kick (Drive: 6 plays, 93 yards, 3:23; Arkansas 14–7)
- (3:11) Texas A&M – Demani Richardson 81 yard fumble return, 2-point failed (Arkansas 14–13)

Third quarter

- (11:41) Texas A&M – De’Von Achane 9 yard rush, Randy Bond kick (Drive: 6 plays, 70 yards, 3:19; Texas A&M 20–14)
- (3:48) Texas A&M – Randy Bond 31 yard field goal (Drive: 12 plays, 47 yards, 6:09; Texas A&M 23–14)

Fourth quarter

- (10:05) Arkansas – KJ Jefferson 6 yard rush, Cam Little kick (Drive: 13 plays, 74 yards, 4:49; Texas A&M 23–21)

Statistics	ARK	TAMU
First downs	24	16
Plays–yards	73–415	55–343
Rushes–yards	54–244	34–192
Passing yards	171	151
Passing: comp–att–int	12–19–0	11–21–0
Turnovers		
Time of possession	30:34	29:26

Team	Category	Player	Statistics
Arkansas	Passing	KJ Jefferson	12–19, 171 yards, 2 TD
Arkansas	Rushing	KJ Jefferson	18 carries, 105 yards, 1 TD
Arkansas	Receiving	Warren Thompson	2 receptions, 57 yards, 1 TD
Texas A&M	Passing	Max Johnson	11–21, 151 yards, 1 TD
Texas A&M	Rushing	De’Von Achane	19 carries, 159 yards, 1 TD
Texas A&M	Receiving	Donovan Greene	3 receptions, 50 yards

=== No. 2 Alabama ===
Uniform Combination
Helmet	Jersey	Pants

Game Five – No. 2 Alabama Crimson Tide (4–0) at No. 20 Arkansas Razorbacks (3–1)

Quarter	1	2	3	4	Total
No. 2 Crimson Tide	14	14	0	21	49
No. 20 Razorbacks	0	7	16	3	26

at Donald W. Reynolds Razorback Stadium • Fayetteville, Arkansas

- Date: Saturday, October 1, 2022
- Game time: 2:30 p.m. CST
- Game weather: Sunny • Temperature: 77 °F (25 °C) • Wind: SW 6 mph
- Game attendance: 75,579
- Referee: Scott Walker
- TV announcers (CBS): Brad Nessler (play-by-play), Gary Danielson (analyst), Jenny Dell (sideline)
- ESPN

Game information

First quarter

- (7:41) Alabama – Kobe Prentice 47 yard pass from Bryce Young, Will Reichard kick (Drive: 6 plays, 65 yards, 2:09; Alabama 7–0)
- (2:35) Alabama – Bryce Young 8 yard rush, Will Reichard kick (Drive: 7 plays, 80 yards, 3:05; Alabama 14–0)

Second quarter

- (8:29) Alabama – Jalen Milroe 4 yard rush, Will Reichard kick (Drive: 3 plays, 17 yards, 0:45; Alabama 21–0)
- (2:51) Alabama – JoJo Earle 22 yard pass from Jalen Milroe, Will Reichard kick (Drive: 10 plays, 59 yards, 4:05; Alabama 28–0)
- (0:21) Arkansas – Ketron Jackson Jr. 6 yard pass from KJ Jefferson, Cam Little kick (Drive: 9 plays, 75 yards, 2:30; Alabama 28–7)

Third quarter

- (7:47) Arkansas – AJ Green 13 yard rush, Cam Little kick (Drive: 7 plays, 78 yards, 2:49; Alabama 28–14)
- (1:38) Arkansas – Cam Little 22 yard field goal (Drive: 12 plays, 50 yards, 6:04; Alabama 28–17)
- (0:19) Arkansas – Raheim Sanders 3 yard rush, 2-point rush failed (Drive: 1 play, 3 yards, 0:06; Alabama 28–23)

Fourth quarter

- (14:09) Alabama – Jase McClellan 3 yard rush, Will Reichard kick (Drive: 5 plays, 75 yards, 1:10; Alabama 35–23)
- (12:17) Alabama – Jahmyr Gibbs 72 yard rush, Will Reichard kick (Drive: 1 play, 72 yards, 0:12; Alabama 42–23)
- (7:38) Arkansas – Cam Little 34 yard field goal (Drive: 13 plays, 59 yards, 4:39; Alabama 42–26)
- (6:55) Alabama – Jahmyr Gibbs 76 yard rush, Will Reichard kick (Drive: 2 plays, 75 yards, 0:43; Alabama 49–26)

Statistics	BAMA	ARK
First downs	17	26
Plays–yards	64–555	85–377
Rushes–yards	42–317	51–187
Passing yards	238	190
Passing: comp–att–int	11–22–1	17–34–0
Turnovers		
Time of possession	26:33	33:27

Team	Category	Player	Statistics
Alabama	Passing	Bryce Young	7–13, 173 yards, 1 TD, 1 INT
Alabama	Rushing	Jahmyr Gibbs	18 carries, 206 yards, 2 TD
Alabama	Receiving	Kobe Prentice	3 receptions, 92 yards, 1 TD
Arkansas	Passing	KJ Jefferson	13–24, 155 yards, 1 TD
Arkansas	Rushing	Raheim Sanders	22 carries, 101 yards, 1 TD
Arkansas	Receiving	Ketron Jackson Jr.	4 receptions, 48 yards, 1 TD

=== At No. 23 Mississippi State ===
Uniform Combination
Helmet	Jersey	Pants

Game Six – Arkansas Razorbacks (3–2) at No. 23 Mississippi State Bulldogs (4–1)

Quarter	1	2	3	4	Total
Razorbacks	0	10	7	0	17
No. 23 Bulldogs	14	7	13	6	40

at Davis Wade Stadium • Starkville, Mississippi

- Date: Saturday, October 8, 2022
- Game time: 11:00 a.m. CST
- Game weather: Fair • Temperature: 66 °F (19 °C) • Wind: S 7 mph
- Game attendance: 57,849
- Referee: Jason Autrey
- TV announcers (SEC Network): Dave Neal (play-by-play), Deuce McAllister (analyst), Tiffany Blackmon (sideline)
- ESPN

Game information

First quarter

- (11:15) Mississippi State – Dillon Johnson 1 yard rush, Ben Raybon kick (Drive: 9 plays, 65 yards, 3:45; Mississippi State 7–0)
- (4:10) Mississippi State – Jaden Walley 5 yard pass from Will Rogers, Ben Raybon kick (Drive: 12 plays, 55 yards, 4:40; Mississippi State 14–0)

Second quarter

- (9:03) Mississippi State – Austin Williams 10 yard pass from Will Rogers, Ben Raybon kick (Drive: 9 plays, 40 yards, 3:02; Mississippi State 21–0)
- (5:56) Arkansas – Cam Little 51 yard field goal (Drive: 9 plays, 42 yards, 3:07; Mississippi State 21–3)
- (1:11) Arkansas – Raheim Sanders 3 yard rush, Cam Little kick (Drive: 2 plays, 71 yards, 0:16; Mississippi State 21–10)

Third quarter

- (11:16) Mississippi State – Caleb Ducking 33 yard pass from Will Rogers, kick failed (Drive: 6 plays, 58 yards, 2:08; Mississippi State 27–10)
- (3:33) Arkansas – Bryce Stephens 54 yard pass from Malik Hornsby, Cam Little kick (Drive: 5 plays, 80 yards, 2:20; Mississippi State 27–17)
- (0:54) Mississippi State – Dillon Johnson 30 yard rush, Ben Raybon kick (Drive: 7 plays, 75 yards, 2:29; Mississippi State 34–17)

Fourth quarter

- (10:28) Mississippi State – Jo'quavious Marks 2 yard rush, kick failed (Drive: 6 plays, 70 yards, 3:16; Mississippi State 40–17)

Statistics	ARK	MSST
First downs	18	33
Plays–yards	67–483	85–568
Rushes–yards	44–241	37–173
Passing yards	242	395
Passing: comp–att–int	10–23–2	31–48–0
Turnovers		
Time of possession	24:19	35:41

Team	Category	Player	Statistics
Arkansas	Passing	Malik Hornsby	8–17, 234 yards, 1 TD, 2 INT
Arkansas	Rushing	Malik Hornsby	8 carries, 114 yards
Arkansas	Receiving	Jadon Haselwood	3 receptions, 113 yards
Mississippi State	Passing	Will Rogers	31–48, 395 yards, 3 TD
Mississippi State	Rushing	Dillon Johnson	17 carries, 100 yards, 2 TD
Mississippi State	Receiving	Jo'Quavious Marks	11 receptions, 80 yards

=== At BYU ===
Uniform Combination
Helmet	Jersey	Pants

Game Seven – Arkansas Razorbacks (3–3) at BYU Cougars (4–2)

Quarter	1	2	3	4	Total
Razorbacks	7	24	14	7	52
Cougars	13	8	14	0	35

at LaVell Edwards Stadium • Provo, Utah

- Date: Saturday, October 15, 2022
- Game time: 2:30 p.m. CST (1:30 p.m. local MST)
- Game weather: Sunny • Temperature: 67 °F (19 °C) • Wind: E 4 mph
- Referee: David Smith
- TV announcers (ESPN): Dave Pasch (play-by-play), Dusty Dvoracek (analyst), Tom Luginbill (sideline)
- ESPN

Game information

First quarter

- (5:39) BYU – Isaac Rex 4 yard pass from Jaren Hall, Justen Smith kick (Drive: 10 plays, 82 yards, 4:57; BYU 7–0)
- (2:37) Arkansas – Raheim Sanders 15 yard rush, Cam Little kick (Drive: 9 plays, 75 yards, 3:02; Tied 7–7)
- (1:11) BYU – Kody Epps 21 yard pass from Jaren Hall, kick failed (Drive: 4 plays, 75 yards, 1:26; BYU 13–7)

Second quarter

- (12:19) Arkansas – Trey Knox 6 yard pass from KJ Jefferson, Cam Little kick (Drive: 10 plays, 75 yards, 3:52; Arkansas 14–13)
- (9:48) BYU – Puka Nacua 5 yard rush, 2-point pass good (Drive: 7 plays, 75 yards, 2:31; BYU 21–14)
- (6:46) Arkansas – Cam Little 34 yard field goal (Drive: 10 plays, 59 yards, 3:02; BYU 21–17)
- (3:39) Arkansas – Matt Landers 4 yard pass from KJ Jefferson, Cam Little kick (Drive: 4 plays, 34 yards, 1:39; Arkansas 24–21)
- (0:40) Arkansas – Rashod Dubinion 15 yard pass from KJ Jefferson, Cam Little kick (Drive: 7 plays, 68 yards, 1:42; Arkansas 31–21)

Third quarter

- (9:53) BYU – Puka Nacua 3 yard rush, Jacob Oldroyd kick (Drive: 10 plays, 75 yards, 5:07; Arkansas 31–28)
- (9:20) Arkansas – Matt Landers 39 yard pass from KJ Jefferson, Cam Little kick (Drive: 2 plays, 75 yards, 0:33; Arkansas 38–28)
- (5:11) BYU – Puka Nacua 33 yard pass from Jaren Hall, Jacob Oldroyd kick (Drive: 10 plays, 75 yards, 4:09; Arkansas 38–35)
- (1:13) Arkansas – Matt Landers 5 yard pass from KJ Jefferson, Cam Little kick (Drive: 12 plays, 75 yards, 3:58; Arkansas 45–35)

Fourth quarter

- (14:25) Arkansas – Raheim Sanders 64 yard rush, Cam Little kick (Drive: 2 plays, 68 yards, 0:29; Arkansas 52–35)

Statistics	ARK	BYU
First downs	34	27
Plays–yards	82–644	71–471
Rushes–yards	42–277	30–115
Passing yards	367	356
Passing: comp–att–int	29–40–0	26–41–1
Turnovers		
Time of possession	31:13	28:47

Team	Category	Player	Statistics
Arkansas	Passing	KJ Jefferson	29–40, 367 yards, 5 TD
Arkansas	Rushing	Raheim Sanders	15 carries, 175 yards, 2 TD
Arkansas	Receiving	Matt Landers	8 receptions, 99 yards, 3 TD
BYU	Passing	Jaren Hall	26–41, 356 yards, 3 TD, 1 INT
BYU	Rushing	Christopher Brooks	10 carries, 53 yards
BYU	Receiving	Puka Nacua	8 receptions, 141 yards, 1 TD

=== At Auburn ===
Uniform Combination
Helmet	Jersey	Pants

Game Eight – Arkansas Razorbacks (4–3) at Auburn Tigers (3–4)

Quarter	1	2	3	4	Total
Razorbacks	7	10	14	10	41
Tigers	3	10	0	14	27

at Jordan–Hare Stadium • Auburn, Alabama

- Date: Saturday, October 29, 2022
- Game time: 11:00 a.m. CST
- Game weather: Cloudy • Temperature: 64 °F (18 °C) • Wind: 10 mph E
- Game attendance: 83,792
- Referee: Steve Marlowe
- TV announcers (SEC Network): Dave Neal (play-by-play), Deuce McAllister (analyst), Andraya Carter (sideline)
- ESPN

Game information

First quarter

- (5:55) Auburn – Anders Carlson 46 yard field goal (Drive: 7 plays, 18 yards, 3:12; Auburn 3–0)
- (3:10) Arkansas – KJ Jefferson 1 yard rush, Cam Little kick (Drive: 8 plays, 75 yards, 2:45; Arkansas 7–3)

Second quarter

- (10:27) Arkansas – KJ Jefferson 13 yard rush, Cam Little kick (Drive: 11 plays, 80 yards, 4:52; Arkansas 14–3)
- (3:43) Auburn – Tank Bigsby 41 yard rush, Anders Carlson kick (Drive: 5 plays, 93 yards, 1:35; Arkansas 14–10)
- (2:25) Arkansas – Cam Little 27 yard field goal (Drive: 5 plays, 56 yards, 1:18; Arkansas 17–10)
- (0:03) Auburn – Anders Carlson 24 yard field goal (Drive: 7 plays, 52 yards, 0:47; Arkansas 17–13)

Third quarter

- (6:02) Arkansas – Jadon Haselwood 11 yard pass from KJ Jefferson, Cam Little kick (Drive: 9 plays, 64 yards, 2:35; Arkansas 24–13)
- (0:44) Arkansas – Rashod Dubinion 2 yard rush, Cam Little kick (Drive: 7 plays, 94 yards, 3:26; Arkansas 31–13)

Fourth quarter

- (7:35) Arkansas – Rashod Dubinion 2 yard rush, Cam Little kick (Drive: 10 plays, 84 yards, 6:38; Arkansas 38–13)
- (5:28) Auburn – Camden Brown 9 yard pass from Robby Ashford, Anders Carlson kick (Drive: 7 plays, 75 yards, 2:07; Arkansas 38–20)
- (1:55) Arkansas – Cam Little 37 yard field goal (Drive: 8 plays, 23 yards, 3:27; Arkansas 41–20)
- (0:04) Auburn – Jarquez Hunter 1 yard rush, Anders Carlson kick (Drive: 7 plays, 75 yards, 1:51; Arkansas 41–27)

Statistics	ARK	AUB
First downs	23	20
Plays–yards	72–520	71–468
Rushes–yards	48–286	38–183
Passing yards	234	285
Passing: comp–att–int	16–24–0	24–33–0
Turnovers		
Time of possession	29:50	30:10

Team	Category	Player	Statistics
Arkansas	Passing	KJ Jefferson	16–24, 234 yards, 1 TD
Arkansas	Rushing	Raheim Sanders	16 carries, 171 yards
Arkansas	Receiving	Matt Landers	4 receptions, 115 yards
Auburn	Passing	Robby Ashford	24–33, 285 yards, 1 TD
Auburn	Rushing	Robby Ashford	19 carries, 87 yards
Auburn	Receiving	Camden Brown	4 receptions, 83 yards, 1 TD

=== Liberty ===
Uniform Combination
Helmet	Jersey	Pants

Game Nine – Liberty Flames (7–1) at Arkansas Razorbacks (5–3)

Quarter	1	2	3	4	Total
Flames	7	14	0	0	21
Razorbacks	0	3	2	14	19

at Donald W. Reynolds Razorback Stadium • Fayetteville, Arkansas

- Date: Saturday, November 5, 2022
- Game time: 3:00 p.m. CST
- Game weather: Clear • Temperature: 56 °F (13 °C) • Wind: 10 mph SW
- Game attendance: 70,072
- Referee: Scott Walker
- TV announcers (SEC Network): Taylor Zarzour (play-by-play), Aaron Murray (analyst), Alyssa Lang (sideline)
- ESPN

Game information

First quarter

- (0:17) Liberty – Noah Frith 16 yard pass from Johnathan Bennett, Nick Brown kick (Drive: 5 plays, 59 yards, 1:19; Liberty 7–0)

Second quarter

- (6:09) Liberty – Demario Douglas 20 yard pass from Johnathan Bennett, Nick Brown kick (Drive: 5 plays, 53 yards, 2:46; Liberty 14–0)
- (0:42) Liberty – Treon Sibley 18 yard pass from Johnathan Bennett, Nick Brown kick (Drive: 10 plays, 80 yards, 4:13; Liberty 21–0)
- (0:00) Arkansas – Cam Little 50 yard field goal (Drive: 4 plays, 44 yards, 0:35; Liberty 21–3)

Third quarter

- (5:33) Arkansas – Punt blocked through the end zone by Quincey McAdoo, safety (Liberty 21–5)

Fourth quarter

- (7:42) Arkansas – Trey Knox 5 yard pass from KJ Jefferson, 2-point rush good (Drive: 17 plays, 84 yards, 5:07; Liberty 21–13)
- (2:36) Arkansas - Trey Knox 8 yard pass from KJ Jefferson, 2-point pass failed (Drive: 7 plays, 85 yards; Liberty 21-19)

Statistics	LIB	ARK
First downs	17	22
Plays–yards	63–315	79–428
Rushes–yards	38–91	42–144
Passing yards	224	284
Passing: comp–att–int	15–25–1	23–37–2
Turnovers		
Time of possession	30:38	29:22

Team	Category	Player	Statistics
Liberty	Passing	Johnathan Bennett	15–25, 224 yards, 3 TD, 1 INT
Liberty	Rushing	Shedro Louis	15 carries, 57 yards
Liberty	Receiving	Demario Douglas	7 receptions, 145 yards, 1 TD
Arkansas	Passing	KJ Jefferson	23–37, 284 yards, 2 TD, 2 INT
Arkansas	Rushing	Raheim Sanders	17 carries, 60 yards
Arkansas	Receiving	Matt Landers	6 receptions, 119 yards

=== No. 7 LSU ===
Uniform Combination
Helmet	Jersey	Pants

Game Ten – No. 7 LSU Tigers (7–2) at Arkansas Razorbacks (5–4)

Quarter	1	2	3	4	Total
No. 7 Tigers	0	6	7	0	13
Razorbacks	3	0	0	7	10

at Donald W. Reynolds Razorback Stadium • Fayetteville, Arkansas

- Date: Saturday, November 12, 2022
- Game time: 11:00 a.m. CST
- Game weather: Sunny • Temperature: 36 °F (2 °C) • Wind: SE 11 mph
- Game attendance: 73,750
- Referee: James Carter
- TV announcers (ESPN): Joe Tessitore (play-by-play), Greg McElroy (analyst), Katie George (sideline)
- ESPN -->

Game information

First quarter

- (4:48) Arkansas – Cam Little 27 yard field goal (Drive: 10 plays, 46 yards, 3:24; Arkansas 3–0)

Second quarter

- (9:28) LSU – Damian Ramos 38 yard field goal (Drive: 5 plays, 17 yards, 1:56; Tied 3–3)
- (1:51) LSU – Damian Ramos 29 yard field goal (Drive: 11 plays, 61 yards, 5:12; LSU 6–3)

Third quarter

- (5:25) LSU – Josh Williams 1 yard rush, Damian Ramos kick (Drive: 5 plays, 40 yards, 1:51; LSU 13–3)

Fourth quarter

- (13:17) Arkansas – Matt Landers 40 yard pass from Cade Fortin, Cam Little kick (Drive: 10 plays, 94 yards, 4:29; LSU 13–10)

Statistics	LSU	ARK
First downs	15	15
Plays–yards	66–284	68–249
Rushes–yards	51–198	46–133
Passing yards	86	116
Passing: comp–att–int	8–15–1	12–22–0
Turnovers		
Time of possession	32:44	27:16

Team	Category	Player	Statistics
LSU	Passing	Jayden Daniels	8–15, 86 yards, 1 INT
LSU	Rushing	Josh Williams	19 carries, 122 yards, 1 TD
LSU	Receiving	Kayshon Boutte	4 receptions, 49 yards
Arkansas	Passing	Cade Fortin	8–13, 92 yards, 1 TD
Arkansas	Rushing	Raheim Sanders	12 carries, 46 yards
Arkansas	Receiving	Matt Landers	2 receptions, 69 yards, 1 TD

=== No. 14 Ole Miss ===
Uniform Combination
Helmet	Jersey	Pants

Game Eleven – No. 14 Ole Miss Rebels (8–2) at Arkansas Razorbacks (5–5)

Quarter	1	2	3	4	Total
No. 14 Rebels	3	3	0	21	27
Razorbacks	14	21	7	0	42

at Donald W. Reynolds Razorback Stadium • Fayetteville, Arkansas

- Date: Saturday, November 19, 2022
- Game time: 6:30 p.m. CST
- Game weather: Clear • Temperature: 35 °F (2 °C) • Wind: 4 mph NW
- Game attendance: 71,365
- Referee: Ken Williamson
- TV announcers (SEC Network): Tom Hart (play-by-play), Jordan Rodgers (analyst), Cole Cubelic (sideline)

Game information

First quarter

- (8:28) Arkansas – Matt Landers 8 yard pass from KJ Jefferson, Cam Little kick (Drive: 7 plays, 69 yards, 2:26; Arkansas 7–0)
- (3:44) Arkansas – Matt Landers 23 yard pass from KJ Jefferson, Cam Little kick (Drive: 8 plays, 73 yards, 1:51; Arkansas 14–0)
- (2:00) Ole Miss – Jonathan Cruz 45 yard field goal (Drive: 5 plays, 48 yards, 1:44; Arkansas 14–3)

Second quarter

- (14:03) Arkansas – Ketron Jackson 20 yard pass from KJ Jefferson, Cam Little kick (Drive: 7 plays, 75 yards, 2:57; Arkansas 21–3)
- (4:38) Ole Miss – Jonathan Cruz 32 yard field goal (Drive: 9 plays, 56 yards, 4:17; Arkansas 21–6)
- (2:20) Arkansas – Raheim Sanders 20 yard rush, Cam Little kick (Drive: 7 plays, 75 yards, 2:18; Arkansas 28–6)
- (0:05) Arkansas – Raheim Sanders 8 yard rush, Cam Little kick (Drive: 6 plays, 48 yards, 1:02; Arkansas 35–6)

Third quarter

- (14:16) Arkansas – Raheim Sanders 68 yard rush, Cam Little kick (Drive: 2 plays, 75 yards, 0:44; Arkansas 42–6)

Fourth quarter

- (14:02) Ole Miss – Quinshon Judkins 1 yard rush, 2-point pass failed (Drive: 9 plays, 96 yards, 2:42; Arkansas 42–12)
- (8:02) Ole Miss – Zach Evans 48 yard rush, 2-point pass good (Drive: 5 plays, 88 yards, 1:50; Arkansas 42–20)
- (2:55) Ole Miss – Malik Heath 13 yard pass from Jaxson Dart, Jonathan Cruz kick (Drive: 12 plays, 86 yards, 3:21; Arkansas 42–27)

Statistics	MISS	ARK
First downs	32	24
Plays–yards	89–703	65–503
Rushes–yards	53–463	43–335
Passing yards	240	168
Passing: comp–att–int	21–36–1	17–22–0
Turnovers		
Time of possession	30:10	29:50

Team	Category	Player	Statistics
Ole Miss	Passing	Jaxson Dart	21–36, 240 yards, 1 TD, 1 INT
Ole Miss	Rushing	Quinshon Judkins	24 carries, 214 yards, 1 TD
Ole Miss	Receiving	Malik Heath	9 receptions, 140 yards, 1 TD
Arkansas	Passing	KJ Jefferson	17–22, 168 yards, 3 TD
Arkansas	Rushing	Raheim Sanders	24 carries, 232 yards, 3 TD
Arkansas	Receiving	Matt Landers	3 receptions, 38 yards, 2 TD

=== At Missouri ===
Uniform Combination
Helmet	Jersey	Pants

Game Twelve – Arkansas Razorbacks (6–5) at Missouri Tigers (5–6)

Quarter	1	2	3	4	Total
Razorbacks	7	14	3	3	27
Tigers	10	10	9	0	29

at Faurot Field • Columbia, Missouri

- Date: Friday, November 25, 2022
- Game time: 2:30 p.m. CST
- Game weather: Sunny • Temperature: 52 °F (11 °C) • Wind: 4 mph S
- Referee: Jason Autrey
- TV announcers (CBS): Tom McCarthy (play-by-play), Rick Neuheisel (analyst), Sherree Burruss (sideline)

Game information

First quarter

- (9:34) Missouri – Harrison Mevis 40 yard field goal (Drive: 7 plays, 46 yards, 3:16; Missouri 3–0)
- (5:26) Arkansas – KJ Jefferson 3 yard rush, Cam Little kick (Drive: 9 plays, 75 yards, 4:08; Arkansas 7–3)
- (2:56) Missouri – Cody Schrader 3 yard rush, Harrison Mevis kick (Drive: 7 plays, 75 yards, 2:30; Missouri 10–7)

Second quarter

- (14:56) Missouri – Brady Cook 9 yard rush, Harrison Mevis kick (Drive: 5 plays, 74 yards, 1:38; Missouri 17–7)
- (9:26) Arkansas – Matt Landers 27 yard pass from KJ Jefferson, Cam Little kick (Drive: 12 plays, 75 yards, 5:30; Missouri 17–14)
- (5:26) Missouri – Harrison Mevis 27 yard field goal (Drive: 9 plays, 65 yards, 4:00; Missouri 20–14)
- (1:35) Arkansas – Raheim Sanders 8 yard pass from KJ Jefferson, Cam Little kick (Drive: 11 plays, 75 yards, 3:51; Arkansas 21–20)

Third quarter

- (10:09) Missouri – Luther Burden III 23 yard pass from Brady Cook, 2-point pass failed (Drive: 10 plays, 75 yards, 4:51; Missouri 26–21)
- (5:32) Missouri – Harrison Mevis 29 yard field goal (Drive: 7 plays, 17 yards, 3:19; Missouri 29–21)
- (1:43) Arkansas – Cam Little 46 yard field goal (Drive: 10 plays, 47 yards, 3:49; Missouri 29–24)

Fourth quarter

- (12:40) Arkansas – Cam Little 20 yard field goal (Drive: 7 plays, 51 yards, 2:30; Missouri 29–27)

Statistics	ARK	MIZ
First downs	22	19
Plays–yards	66–324	65–468
Rushes–yards	38–113	39–226
Passing yards	211	242
Passing: comp–att–int	20–28–1	16–26–0
Turnovers		
Time of possession	28:18	31:42

Team	Category	Player	Statistics
Arkansas	Passing	KJ Jefferson	20–27, 205 yards, 2 TD
Arkansas	Rushing	Raheim Sanders	10 carries, 47 yards
Arkansas	Receiving	Matt Landers	4 receptions, 79 yards, 1 TD
Missouri	Passing	Brady Cook	16–26, 242 yards, 1 TD
Missouri	Rushing	Brady Cook	18 carries, 138 yards, 1 TD
Missouri	Receiving	Dominic Lovett	6 receptions, 130 yards

=== Vs. Kansas—Liberty Bowl ===
Uniform Combination
Helmet	Jersey	Pants

Game Thirteen – Liberty Bowl – Arkansas Razorbacks (6–6) vs. Kansas Jayhawks (6–6)

Quarter	1	2	3	4	OT	2OT	3OT	Total
Jayhawks	7	6	7	18	7	8	0	53
Razorbacks	24	7	7	0	7	8	2	55

at Simmons Bank Liberty Stadium • Memphis, Tennessee

- Date: Wednesday, December 28, 2022
- Game time: 4:30 p.m. CST
- Game weather: Sunny • Temperature: 61 °F (16 °C) • Wind: S 13 mph
- Game attendance: 52,847
- Referee: Matthew Richards
- TV announcers (ESPN): Dave O'Brien (play-by-play), Dan Mullen (analyst), and Taylor McGregor (sideline)

Statistics	KAN	ARK
First downs	32	29
Plays–yards	90–603	81–681
Rushes–yards	34–59	52–394
Passing yards	544	287
Passing: comp–att–int	37–56–2	19–29–1
Turnovers		
Time of possession	30:52	29:08

Team	Category	Player	Statistics
Kansas	Passing	Jalon Daniels	37–55, 544 yards, 5 TD, 2 INT
Kansas	Rushing	Devin Neal	9 carries, 29 yards
Kansas	Receiving	Luke Grimm	10 receptions, 167 yards, 1 TD
Arkansas	Passing	KJ Jefferson	19–29, 287 yards, 2 TD, 1 INT
Arkansas	Rushing	KJ Jefferson	14 carries, 130 yards, 2 TD
Arkansas	Receiving	Matt Landers	3 receptions, 121 yards, 1 TD

== Personnel ==
=== Coaching staff ===
Arkansas Razorbacks coaches
Sam Pittman	Head coach	3rd
Kendal Briles	Offensive coordinator/quarterbacks coach	3rd
Barry Odom	Defensive coordinator/Safeties coach	3rd
Scott Fountain	Assistant head coach/Special teams coordinator	3rd
Dowell Loggains	Tight ends coach	2nd
Cody Kennedy	Offensive line coach	2nd
Kenny Guiton	Wide receivers coach	2nd
Jimmy Smith	Running backs coach	3rd
Michael Scherer	Linebackers coach	2nd
Deke Adams	Defensive line coach	1st
Dominique Bowman	Cornerbacks coach	1st
Jamil Walker	Strength and conditioning coach	3rd

=== Recruits ===
The Razorbacks signed a total of 20 recruits on the first day of the early signing period, December 15, 2021, all from high school for the 2022 Class. Arkansas also signed one junior college player in May 2022.

College recruiting
Name	Hometown	School	Height	Weight	Commit date
Isaiah Sategna; WR	Fayetteville, AR	Fayetteville	5 ft 11 in (1.80 m)	170 lb (77 kg)	
Isaiah Sategna; WR	Recruit ratings: Rivals: 247Sports: ESPN:				
Andrew Chamblee; OL	Maumelle, AR	Maumelle	6 ft 7 in (2.01 m)	305 lb (138 kg)	
Andrew Chamblee; OL	Recruit ratings: Rivals: 247Sports: ESPN:				
E'Marion Harris; OL	Little Rock, AR	Joe T. Robinson	6 ft 7 in (2.01 m)	370 lb (170 kg)	
E'Marion Harris; OL	Recruit ratings: Rivals: 247Sports: ESPN:				
Quincey McAdoo; WR	Clarendon, AR		6 ft 3 in (1.91 m)	175 lb (79 kg)	
Quincey McAdoo; WR	Recruit ratings: Rivals: 247Sports: ESPN:				
Rashod Dubinion; RB	Ellenwood, GA	Cedar Grove	5 ft 10 in (1.78 m)	185 lb (84 kg)	
Rashod Dubinion; RB	Recruit ratings: Rivals: 247Sports: ESPN:				
Nico Davillier; DL	Maumelle, AR		6 ft 4 in (1.93 m)	275 lb (125 kg)	
Nico Davillier; DL	Recruit ratings: Rivals: 247Sports: ESPN:				
Samuel M'bake; WR	Kennesaw, GA	North Cobb	6 ft 3 in (1.91 m)	205 lb (93 kg)	
Samuel M'bake; WR	Recruit ratings: Rivals: 247Sports: ESPN:				
Patrick Kutas; OL	Memphis, TN	Christian Brothers	6 ft 6 in (1.98 m)	305 lb (138 kg)	
Patrick Kutas; OL	Recruit ratings: Rivals: 247Sports: ESPN:				
Anthony Brown; S	Milan, TN		6 ft 2 in (1.88 m)	190 lb (86 kg)	
Anthony Brown; S	Recruit ratings: Rivals: 247Sports: ESPN:				
Mani Powell; LB	Fayetteville, AR		6 ft 3 in (1.91 m)	225 lb (102 kg)	
Mani Powell; LB	Recruit ratings: Rivals: 247Sports: ESPN:				
Jordan Crook; LB	Duncanville, TX		6 ft 0 in (1.83 m)	225 lb (102 kg)	
Jordan Crook; LB	Recruit ratings: Rivals: 247Sports: ESPN:				
Jaylen Lewis; CB	Brownsville, TN	Haywood	6 ft 0 in (1.83 m)	175 lb (79 kg)	
Jaylen Lewis; CB	Recruit ratings: Rivals: 247Sports: ESPN:				
James Jointer; RB	Little Rock, AR	Parkview	6 ft 0 in (1.83 m)	210 lb (95 kg)	
James Jointer; RB	Recruit ratings: Rivals: 247Sports: ESPN:				
Tyrus Washington; TE	Leesburg, GA	Lee County	6 ft 4 in (1.93 m)	230 lb (100 kg)	
Tyrus Washington; TE	Recruit ratings: Rivals: 247Sports: ESPN:				
Eli Henderson; OL	Duncan, SC	Byrnes	6 ft 4 in (1.93 m)	290 lb (130 kg)	
Eli Henderson; OL	Recruit ratings: Rivals: 247Sports: ESPN:				
J.J. Hollingsworth; DL	Greenland, AR		6 ft 4 in (1.93 m)	250 lb (110 kg)	
J.J. Hollingsworth; DL	Recruit ratings: Rivals: 247Sports: ESPN:				
Dax Courtney; TE	Clarendon, AR		6 ft 6 in (1.98 m)	210 lb (95 kg)	
Dax Courtney; TE	Recruit ratings: Rivals: 247Sports: ESPN:				
Kaden Henley; LB	Springdale, AR	Shiloh Christian	6 ft 2 in (1.88 m)	225 lb (102 kg)	
Kaden Henley; LB	Recruit ratings: Rivals: 247Sports: ESPN:				
Max Fletcher; P	Melbourne, Australia		6 ft 5 in (1.96 m)	190 lb (86 kg)	
Max Fletcher; P	Recruit ratings: Rivals: 247Sports:				
Eli Stein; LS	Cambridge, WI		6 ft 3 in (1.91 m)	215 lb (98 kg)	
Eli Stein; LS	Recruit ratings: Rivals: 247Sports:				
Taylor Lewis; DT	Chicago, IL.	College of the Canyons C.C., CA.	6 ft 3 in (1.91 m)	295 lb (134 kg)	May 31, 2022
Taylor Lewis; DT	Recruit ratings: Rivals: 247Sports:				
Overall recruit ranking: Rivals: 26 247Sports: 28
Note: In many cases, Scout, Rivals, 247Sports, On3, and ESPN may conflict in their listings of height and weight.; In these cases, the average was taken. ESPN grades are on a 100-point scale.; Sources: "Arkansas Football Commitments". Rivals.; "2022 Team Ranking". Rivals.com.

=== Transfers ===
Arkansas signed nine transfers from the NCAA transfer portal. According to 247Sports, Arkansas had the No. 11 portal transfer class in the nation.

Pos.	Star Rating	Player	Height	Weight	Former school	Year	Hometown	Note
WR	5☆	Jadon Haselwood	6'3"	210	Oklahoma	Junior	Ellenwood, GA	
LB	5☆	Drew Sanders	6'5"	240	Alabama	Junior	Denton, TX	
DL	4☆	Landon Jackson	6'7"	275	LSU	Sophomore	Texarkana, TX	
CB	4☆	Dwight McGlothern	6'2"	185	LSU	Junior	Houston, TX	
S	4☆	Latavious Brini	6'2"	210	Georgia	Senior	Miami Gardens, FL	
DE	3☆	Jordan Domineck	6'3"	245	Georgia Tech	Senior	Lakeland, FL	
QB	3☆	Cade Fortin	6'3"	225	South Florida	Senior	Suwanee, GA	preferred walk-on
DL	3☆	Terry Hampton	6'0"	295	Arkansas State	Senior	El Dorado, AR	
WR	3☆	Matt Landers	6'5"	200	Toledo	Senior	St. Petersburg, FL	Transferred to Toledo from Georgia

== Statistics ==
=== Team ===
==== Scores by quarter ====
	1	2	3	4	Total
Arkansas	14	48	29	49	140
Non-conference opponents	27	32	38	10	107

	1	2	3	4	Total
Arkansas	52	76	47	53	228
SEC opponents	47	69	46	76	238

	1	2	3	4	Total
Arkansas	66	124	76	102	368
All opponents	74	101	84	86	345
