= Robby Ashford =

American football player (born 2002)

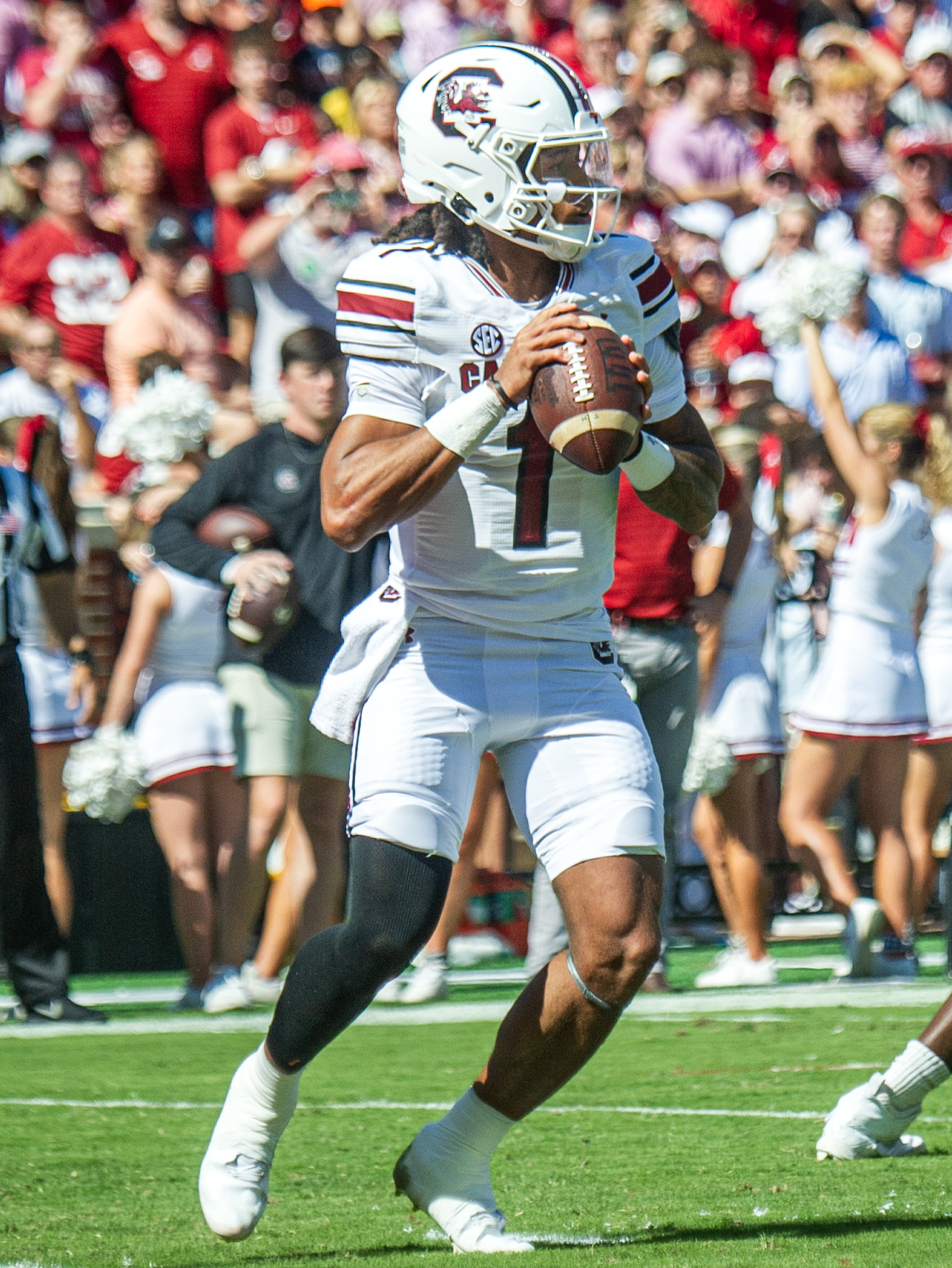
- Ashford with South Carolina in 2024

No. 2
- Position: Quarterback

Personal information
- Born: October 1, 2002 (age 24)
- Listed height: 6 ft 2 in (1.88 m)
- Listed weight: 207 lb (94 kg)

Career information
- High school: Hoover (Hoover, Alabama)
- College: Oregon (2020–2021); Auburn (2022–2023); South Carolina (2024); Wake Forest (2025)

Awards and highlights
- SEC All-Freshman Team (2022)
- Stats at ESPN

Robert Logan Ashford (born October 1, 2002) is an American former college football quarterback for the Oregon Ducks, Auburn Tigers, South Carolina Gamecocks, and Wake Forest Demon Deacons.

== Early life ==
Ashford grew up in Hoover, Alabama and attended Hoover High School. Ashford was rated a four-star recruit and initially committed to play college football and baseball at Ole Miss. He later de-committed and ultimately signed to play at Oregon.

== College career ==
=== Oregon ===
Ashford began his college career at Oregon. He did not appear in any games for the football team in two seasons. Ashford played for Oregon's baseball team during his freshman year, playing in 20 games as an outfielder and batting .200. He decided to focus solely on football after his freshman year. Following the end of his second football season, Ashford entered the NCAA transfer portal.

=== Auburn ===
On January 17, 2022, Ashford transferred to Auburn. He made his first career start against LSU on October 1, 2022, throwing for 337 yards in a 21–17 loss. Ashford passed for 1,613 yards with seven touchdown and seven interceptions while also rushing for 710 yards and seven touchdowns in 2022.

On December 15, 2023, Ashford announced that he would be entering the transfer portal for the second time.

=== South Carolina ===
On January 16, 2024, Ashford announced that he would transfer to South Carolina. Ashford made his Gamecocks debut in week 2 against Kentucky. In week 4 against Akron, Ashford made his first start of the season replacing LaNorris Sellers who was injured the previous week against LSU. Ashford was 15-of-21 passing for 243 yards and two touchdowns while rushing for 133 yards and a touchdown in the 50–7 victory. On the season he appeared in eight games (one start) while completing 23-of-32 passes for 324 yards and two touchdowns. He added another 227 yards on the ground over 41 rushes and had two touchdowns.

On December 10, 2024, Ashford announced that he would enter the transfer portal for the third time.

=== Wake Forest ===
On January 5, 2025, Ashford decided to transfer to Wake Forest. He was named the teams starting quarterback over Deshawn Purdie headed into the season opener against Kennesaw State. Against the Owls, Ashford completed 20-of-28 passes for 218 yards. Ashford added 42 rushing yards and a touchdown in the 10–9 victory. Ashford was named MVP of the 2026 Duke's Mayo Bowl.

=== Statistics ===
Season	Team	Games			Passing								Rushing			
Season	Team	GP	GS	Record	Cmp	Att	Pct	Yds	Y/A	TD	Int	Rtg	Att	Yds	Avg	TD
2020	Oregon	0	0	—	Redshirted (redshirt)											
2021	Oregon	0	0	—	DNP											
2022	Auburn	12	9	3–6	123	250	49.2	1,613	6.5	7	7	107.0	153	710	4.6	7
2023	Auburn	10	1	0–1	14	27	51.9	145	5.4	2	2	106.6	46	217	4.7	5
2024	South Carolina	8	1	1–0	23	32	71.9	324	10.1	2	0	177.6	41	227	5.5	2
2025	Wake Forest	12	11	7–4	191	322	59.3	2,472	7.7	12	8	131.1	130	554	4.3	9
Career		42	22	11–11	351	631	55.6	4,554	7.2	23	17	122.9	370	1,708	4.6	23

== Professional career ==
Pre-draft measurables
Height	Weight	Arm length	Hand span	Wingspan	40-yard dash	10-yard split	20-yard split	Vertical jump	Broad jump
6 ft 2 1/8 in (1.88 m)	207 lb (94 kg)	32 in (0.81 m)	8 5/8 in (0.22 m)	6 ft 5 1/4 in (1.96 m)	4.65 s	1.58 s	2.64 s	30.5 in (0.77 m)	10 ft 0 in (3.05 m)
All values from Pro Day
