= Josh Williams (running back) =

American football player (born 2001)

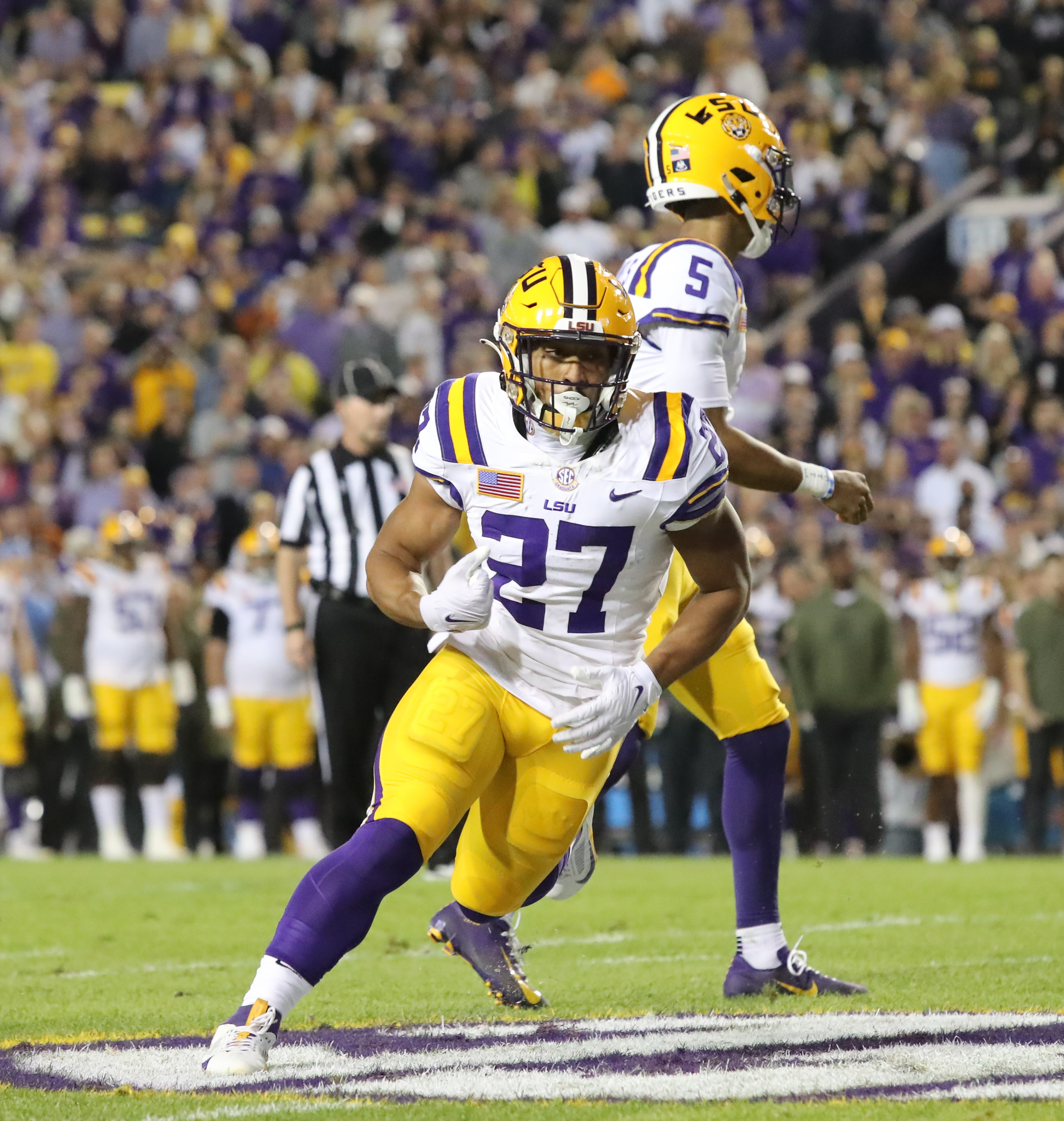

No. 18 – Tampa Bay Buccaneers
- Position: Running back
- Roster status: Practice squad

Personal information
- Born: June 9, 2001 (age 25); Houston, Texas, U.S.
- Listed height: 5 ft 9 in (1.75 m)
- Listed weight: 210 lb (95 kg)

Career information
- High school: The Kinkaid School (Piney Point Village, Texas)
- College: LSU (2019–2024)
- NFL draft: 2025: undrafted

Career history
- Tampa Bay Buccaneers (2025–present)

Career NFL statistics as of 2025
- Rushing yards: 11
- Rushing average: 2.8
- Return yards: 129
- Stats at Pro Football Reference

Josh Williams (born June 9, 2001) is an American professional football running back for the Tampa Bay Buccaneers of the National Football League (NFL). He played college football for the LSU Tigers.

== Early life ==
Williams attended The Kinkaid School in Piney Point Village, Texas. He committed to play college football for the LSU Tigers, joining the team as a walk-on. He went on to earn a scholarship after his first season.

== College career ==
As a freshman in 2019 Williams did not appear in any games as he was a scout team member, as the Tigers went on to win the National Championship. During the 2020 and 2021 season, he combined to rush for 196 yards. In week 9 of the 2022 season, Williams rushed for 106 yards on 14 carries in a win over Florida. In week 12, he rushed for a career-high 122 yards and a touchdown on 19 carries in a win over Arkansas. Williams finished the 2022 season with 532 rushing yards and six touchdowns for the Tigers. In week 12 of the 2023 season, he rushed for 30 yards and a touchdown on 11 carries, while also hauling in a reception for 45 yards in a win over Florida. During the 2023 season, Williams notched 55 carries for 284 yards and five touchdowns, as well as a receiving touchdown. In week 13 of the 2024 season, he notched 90 yards and two touchdowns on 14 carries and hauled in four catches for 61 yards in a win over Vanderbilt. Williams finished the 2024 season, appearing in 13 games where he rushed for 482 yards and six touchdowns on 117 carries, while also racking up 31 catches for 263 yards. After the season, he declared for the 2025 NFL draft. Williams also accepted an invite to participate in the 2025 Tropical Bowl. Williams also accepted an invite to participate in the East West Shrine Bowl.

Williams played six seasons at LSU from 2019 to 2024. During his collegiate career, he appeared in 60 games with 17 starts, totaling 1,494 rushing yards and 17 rushing touchdowns. He also recorded 71 receptions for 600 yards and one receiving touchdown. Williams was a member of LSU’s 2019 national championship team.

Academically, Williams earned a Bachelor’s degree in marketing in 2022 and a Master’s degree in business administration in 2023. He was named to the SEC Academic Honor Roll four times and was selected as LSU’s nominee for the National Football Foundation Scholar-Athlete Award in both 2023 and 2024.

During his final season at LSU, Williams served as a team captain and was awarded the program’s No. 18 jersey prior to the 2024 season, an honor given annually to a player recognized for leadership and character. He was also selected to the 2024 SEC Community Service Team.

Williams participated in LSU’s study-abroad and community service program in May 2023, traveling to Senegal, Africa, where he took part in service-based activities organized by the university. He also participated in basketball exhibition events in China, where he played in games alongside former NBA player Hakeem Olajuwon.

After completing his collegiate career, Williams signed with the Tampa Bay Buccaneers and joined the organization as a running back.

Williams’ mother Kimberly Williams, has represented him in a professional capacity, serving as his certified NFL agent.

Williams’ brother, Jordan Williams, is a two-sport athlete who played college football at both Texas A&M University and Vanderbilt University. Jordan Williams is now a scholarship football player for the University of Maryland.

== Professional career ==
Pre-draft measurables
Height	Weight	Arm length	Hand span	Wingspan	40-yard dash	10-yard split	20-yard split	20-yard shuttle	Three-cone drill	Vertical jump	Broad jump	Bench press
5 ft 8 3/8 in (1.74 m)	196 lb (89 kg)	30 in (0.76 m)	9 3/4 in (0.25 m)	6 ft 1 1/8 in (1.86 m)	4.45 s	1.57 s	2.65 s	4.32 s	7.03 s	42.0 in (1.07 m)	10 ft 2 in (3.10 m)	23 reps
All values from Pro Day

Williams signed with the Tampa Bay Buccaneers as an undrafted free agent on May 9, 2025. He was named the fourth-string running back on the final 53-player opening roster for the regular season. Williams' first carries came in Week 8 against the New Orleans Saints. On January 8, 2026, he signed a reserve/futures contract with the Buccaneers.

On August 30, 2026, Williams was waived by the Buccaneers as a part of final roster cuts; he was re-signed to the team's practice squad the following day.

== NFL career statistics ==
Year	Team	Games		Rushing					Receiving					Kick returns					Fumbles	
Year	Team	GP	GS	Att	Yds	Avg	Lng	TD	Rec	Yds	Avg	Lng	TD	Ret	Yds	Avg	Lng	TD	Fum	Lost
2025	TB	3	0	4	11	2.8	4	0	—	—	—	—	—	5	129	25.8	28	0	0	0
Career		3	0	4	11	2.8	4	0	—	—	—	—	—	5	129	25.8	28	0	0	0

== Personal life ==
Williams is the son of former NFL running back Jermaine Williams and his mother is Kimberly Williams who represents him as his NFL Certified Agent. His siblings are Jordan and Jazlynn Williams.
