= Matt Landers =

American football player (born 1999)

Profile
- Position: Wide receiver

Personal information
- Born: June 16, 1999 (age 27); St. Petersburg, Florida, U.S.
- Listed height: 6 ft 4 in (1.93 m)
- Listed weight: 200 lb (91 kg)

Career information
- High school: Lakewood (FL); Admiral Farragut (FL); St. Petersburg (FL)
- College: Georgia (2017–2020); Toledo (2021); Arkansas (2022)
- NFL draft: 2023: undrafted

Career history
- Seattle Seahawks (2023)*; Carolina Panthers (2023)*; Dallas Renegades (2024)*; San Antonio Brahmas (2024)*; Cleveland Browns (2024)*; New England Patriots (2024)*; Tennessee Titans (2025)*
- * Offseason or practice squad member only
- Stats at Pro Football Reference

Matt Landers (born June 16, 1999) is an American professional football wide receiver. He played college football for the Georgia Bulldogs, Toledo Rockets, and Arkansas Razorbacks.

== Early life ==
A native of St. Petersburg, Florida, and the son of former basketball player Toney Mack, Landers attended three different high schools in the state. He spent his freshman and sophomore years at Lakewood High School before transferring to Admiral Farragut Academy as a junior; on the football team with the latter, he posted 1,038 yards and 15 touchdowns. He then transferred to St. Petersburg High School and recorded 40 receptions for 719 yards and seven scores. He was ranked a three-star recruit and the 97th-best wide receiver nationally, as well as the 89th-best player in the state. Landers eventually committed to play college football at Georgia.

== College career ==
In his first year at Georgia in 2017, Landers saw no action and was a scout team member. The following season, he appeared in four games but posted no receptions. In 2019, he saw action in 12 of their 14 games and posted 10 catches for 105 yards. However, in 2020, he only caught a mere two passes for 27 yards, despite playing in nine games. Following the season, Landers transferred to Toledo. In 12 games played with Toledo, he posted 20 catches for 514 yards and five scores. As Landers had one year of eligibility remaining due to the NCAA not counting the 2020 season against any football player's athletic eligibility due to the COVID-19 pandemic, he opted to return for a final season and transferred to Arkansas. He had his best season with them in 2022, recording 47 catches for 901 yards with eight touchdowns; his yards total was the eighth-best in school history in a single season, and his touchdown total was sixth. Additionally, he recorded four 100-yard games, the fourth-highest total for an Arkansas player. In his last game with Arkansas, Landers caught three passes for 121 yards and a touchdown in the Razorbacks' 55–53 triple-overtime victory over Kansas in the 2022 Liberty Bowl. Landers finished his college career having played in 50 games for three programs, posting 1,547 receiving yards off 79 receptions with 14 scores.

== Professional career ==
Pre-draft measurables
Height	Weight	Arm length	Hand span	40-yard dash	10-yard split	20-yard split	20-yard shuttle	Three-cone drill	Vertical jump	Broad jump
6 ft 4 3/8 in (1.94 m)	200 lb (91 kg)	32 1/2 in (0.83 m)	9 1/4 in (0.23 m)	4.37 s	1.51 s	2.53 s	4.32 s	6.86 s	37.0 in (0.94 m)	10 ft 10 in (3.30 m)

=== Seattle Seahawks ===
Landers posted the third-fastest 40-yard dash for a receiver at the 2023 NFL Scouting Combine. After going unselected in the 2023 NFL draft, he was signed by the Seattle Seahawks as an undrafted free agent. He was waived on August 29, 2023 and re-signed to the practice squad. He was released on September 20.

=== Carolina Panthers ===
On September 26, 2023, Landers was signed to the Carolina Panthers practice squad. He was released on December 5.

=== Arlington Renegades ===
On January 23, 2024, Landers signed with the Arlington Renegades of the United Football League (UFL). He was waived by Arlington on March 10.

=== San Antonio Brahmas ===
Landers was claimed off waivers by the San Antonio Brahmas on March 10, 2024. He was waived by the Brahmas on April 9.

=== Cleveland Browns ===
On May 21, 2024, Landers signed with the Cleveland Browns. He was waived on August 19.

=== New England Patriots ===
On August 20, 2024, Landers was claimed off waivers by the New England Patriots. He was waived on August 27, and re-signed to the practice squad. He was waived again on October 8.

=== Tennessee Titans ===
On July 25, 2025, Landers signed with the Tennessee Titans. He was waived/injured on August 25.
