= 2023 Southeastern Conference football season =

- League: NCAA Division I Football Bowl Subdivision
- Sport: Football
- Duration: August 26 – December 2, 2023
- Games: 8
- Teams: 14
- TV partner(s): CBS, ABC, ESPN, ESPN2, ESPN3, ESPNU, SEC Network, ESPN+

2024 NFL draft
- Top draft pick: Jayden Daniels, QB, LSU
- Picked by: Washington Commanders, 2nd overall

Regular season
- Season MVP: Jayden Daniels, LSU, QB
- East champions: Georgia
- West champions: Alabama

SEC Championship Game
- Date: December 2, 2023
- Venue: Mercedes-Benz Stadium, Atlanta, Georgia
- Champions: Alabama
- Runners-up: Georgia
- Finals MVP: Jalen Milroe, Alabama, QB

SEC seasons
- 2022 2024

2023 Southeastern Conference football standings
	Conf.			Overall
Team	W		L	W		L
Eastern Division
No. 4 Georgia xy	8	–	0	13	–	1
No. 8 Missouri	6	–	2	11	–	2
No. 17 Tennessee	4	–	4	9	–	4
Kentucky	3	–	5	7	–	6
Florida	3	–	5	5	–	7
South Carolina	3	–	5	5	–	7
Vanderbilt	0	–	8	2	–	10
Western Division
No. 5 Alabama xy$^	8	–	0	12	–	2
No. 9 Ole Miss	6	–	2	11	–	2
No. 12 LSU	6	–	2	10	–	3
Texas A&M	4	–	4	7	–	6
Auburn	3	–	5	6	–	7
Mississippi State	1	–	7	5	–	7
Arkansas	1	–	7	4	–	8
Championship: Alabama 27, Georgia 24
^ – College Football Playoff participant; $ – Conference champion; x – Division champion/co-champions; y – Championship game participant; Rankings from AP Poll

The 2023 Southeastern Conference football season was the 91st season of Southeastern Conference (SEC) football, taking place during the 2023 NCAA Division I FBS football season. The season began on August 26, 2023, and ended with the 2023 SEC Championship Game on December 2, 2023. The SEC was a Power Five conference in the current College Football Playoff system. The season schedule was released on September 20, 2022. This was also the final year for the conference's divisional structure as Texas and Oklahoma will join the SEC in 2024. This was also the final year in which CBS broadcast the Southeastern Conference games.

== Preseason ==
=== Recruiting classes ===
National rankings
Team	ESPN	Rivals	24/7	On3 Recruits	Total signees
Alabama		1	1	1	28
Arkansas		20	22	24	20
Auburn		15	17	17	21
Florida		13	14	13	20
Georgia		2	2	2	26
Kentucky		27	31	31	19
LSU		5	6	5	25
Mississippi State		22	25	23	27
Missouri		32	33	36	19
Ole Miss		33	30	25	14
South Carolina		17	16	16	24
Tennessee		12	9	12	25
Texas A&M		14	15	15	19
Vanderbilt		46	52	55	21

Note: ESPN only ranks the top 40 teams.

=== SEC Media Days ===
The 2023 SEC Media days were held on July 17–20, 2023 at Grand Hyatt Nashville in downtown Nashville, TN. The Preseason Polls were released in July 2023. Each team had their head coach available to talk to the media at the event. Coverage of the event was televised on SEC Network and ESPN.

The teams and representatives in respective order were as follows:

- SEC Commissioner – Greg Sankey
- Monday July 17
  - LSU – Brian Kelly (HC), Jayden Daniels (QB), Josh Williams (RB), Mekhi Wingo (DT)
  - Missouri - Eliah Drinkwitz (HC), Kris Abrams-Draine (DB), Javon Foster (OL), Darius Robinson (DL)
  - Texas A&M – Jimbo Fisher (HC), Fadil Diggs (DL), McKinnley Jackson (DL), Ainias Smith (WR)
- Tuesday July 18
  - Auburn – Hugh Freeze (HC), Luke Deal (TE), Elijah McAllister (LB), Kameron Stutts (OL)
  - Georgia – Kirby Smart (HC), Brock Bowers (TE), Kamari Lassiter (DB), Sedrick Van Pran-Granger (OL)
  - Mississippi State – Zach Arnett (HC), Jaden Crumedy (DT), Jo'Quavious Marks (RB), Will Rogers (QB)
  - Vanderbilt – Clark Lea (HC), Ethan Barr (LB), Jaylen Mahoney (S), Will Sheppard (WR)
- Wednesday July 19
  - Alabama – Nick Saban (HC), JC Latham (OL), Kool-Aid McKinstry (DB), Dallas Turner (LB)
  - Arkansas – Sam Pittman (HC), Landon Jackson (DE), KJ Jefferson (QB), Raheim Sanders (RB)
  - Florida – Billy Napier (HC), Kingsley Eguakun (OL), Jason Marshall Jr. (DB), Ricky Pearsall (WR)
  - Kentucky – Mark Stoops (HC), Eli Cox (OL), Octavious Oxendine (DL), J. J. Weaver (LB)
- Thursday July 20
  - Ole Miss – Lane Kiffin (HC), Cedric Johnson (DE), Quinshon Judkins (RB), Deantre Prince (CB)
  - South Carolina – Shane Beamer (HC), Tonka Hemingway (DL), Kai Kroeger (P), Spencer Rattler (QB)
  - Tennessee - Josh Heupel (HC), Joe Milton (QB), Omari Thomas (DL), Jacob Warren (TE)

==== Preseason media polls ====
East
Predicted finish	Team	Votes (1st place)
1	Georgia	(265) 2011
2	Tennessee	(14) 1682
3	South Carolina	(3) 1254
4	Kentucky	1204
5	Florida	911
6	Missouri	658
7	Vanderbilt	(8) 428

West
Predicted finish	Team	Votes (1st place)
1	Alabama	(165) 1899
2	LSU	(117) 1838
3	Texas A&M	(1) 1144
4	Ole Miss	1128
5	Arkansas	(3) 958
6	Auburn	(4) 685
7	Mississippi State	(1) 496

Media poll (SEC Championship)
Rank	Team	Votes
1	Georgia	181
2	Alabama	62
3	LSU	31

=== Preseason awards ===
==== All−American Teams ====
	AP 1st Team	AP 2nd Team	AS 1st Team	AS 2nd Team	AS 3rd Team	AS 4th Team	WCFF 1st Team	WCFF 2nd Team	ESPN	CBS 1st Team	CBS 2nd Team	CFN 1st Team	CFN 2nd Team	PFF 1st Team	PFF 2nd Team	PFF 3rd Team	SN 1st Team	SN 2nd Team
Tyler Booker									✓									
Brock Bowers	✓		✓				✓		✓			✓		✓			✓	
Barion Brown						✓												
Javon Bullard		✓			✓											✓		✓
Will Campbell						✓										✓		
Nik Constantinou						✓									✓			
Zakhari Franklin						✓												
Bryce Foster													✓					
Lideatrick Griffin				✓				✓	✓					✓				✓
Ty'Ron Hopper					✓													
Jamon Dumas-Johnson	✓		✓					✓	✓							✓	✓	
Quinshon Judkins	✓		✓				✓		✓			✓		✓			✓	
Kai Kroeger		✓		✓			✓		✓			✓						
JC Latham		✓	✓					✓							✓			✓
Beaux Limmer					✓			✓						✓				
Jason Marshall Jr.																✓		
Kool-Aid McKinstry	✓		✓				✓		✓					✓			✓	
Smael Mondon						✓												
Malik Nabers		✓			✓										✓			✓
Harold Perkins Jr.	✓		✓				✓		✓					✓			✓	
Tate Ratledge															✓			
Will Reichard						✓												
Demani Richardson					✓													
Raheim Sanders		✓		✓				✓				✓			✓			✓
Ainias Smith					✓													
Maason Smith						✓												
Malaki Starks	✓		✓					✓	✓						✓			
Evan Stewart						✓												
Dallas Turner		✓				✓			✓									
Nathaniel Watson						✓												
Juice Wells						✓												
Mykel Williams				✓				✓	✓							✓		
Mekhi Wingo		✓			✓			✓								✓		✓
Sedrick Van Pran-Granger	✓				✓				✓			✓						✓
Dominic Zvada															✓			

==== Individual awards ====
Award	Head Coach/Player	School	Position	Year	Ref
Lott Trophy	Kool-Aid McKinstry	Alabama	DB	Jr.	
Lott Trophy	Malachi Moore	Alabama	DB	Sr.	
Lott Trophy	Dwight McGlothern	Arkansas	DB	Sr.	
Lott Trophy	Malaki Starks	Georgia	DB	So.	
Lott Trophy	Deone Walker	Kentucky	DL	So.	
Lott Trophy	Harold Perkins Jr.	LSU	LB	So.	
Lott Trophy	Maason Smith	LSU	DL	RS So.	
Lott Trophy	Ty'Ron Hopper	Missouri	LB	Sr.	
Lott Trophy	Nathaniel Watson	Mississippi State	LB	GS.	
Dodd Trophy	Nick Saban	Alabama	HC	--	
Dodd Trophy	Sam Pittman	Arkansas	HC	--	
Maxwell Award	Jase McClellan	Alabama	RB	Jr.	
Maxwell Award	KJ Jefferson	Arkansas	QB	Sr.	
Maxwell Award	Raheim Sanders	Arkansas	RB	Jr.	
Maxwell Award	Ricky Pearsall	Florida	WR	Sr.	
Maxwell Award	Brock Bowers	Georgia	TE	Jr.	
Maxwell Award	Devin Leary	Kentucky	QB	Sr.	
Maxwell Award	Jayden Daniels	LSU	QB	Sr.	
Maxwell Award	Malik Nabers	LSU	WR	Jr.	
Maxwell Award	Will Rogers	Mississippi State	QB	Sr.	
Maxwell Award	Quinshon Judkins	Ole Miss	RB	So.	
Maxwell Award	Spencer Rattler	South Carolina	QB	Sr.	
Maxwell Award	Antwane Wells Jr.	South Carolina	WR	Sr.	
Maxwell Award	Joe Milton	Tennessee	QB	Sr.	
Maxwell Award	Will Sheppard	Vanderbilt	WR	Sr.	
Outland Trophy	Jaheim Oatis	Alabama	DL	So.	
Outland Trophy	Tyler Booker	Alabama	OL	So.	
Outland Trophy	Beaux Limmer	Arkansas	OL	RS Sr.	
Outland Trophy	Justin Rogers	Auburn	DL	Jr.	
Outland Trophy	Nazir Stackhouse	Georgia	DL	Sr.	
Outland Trophy	Sedrick Van Pran-Granger	Georgia	OL	RS So.	
Outland Trophy	Tate Ratledge	Georgia	OL	RS So.	
Outland Trophy	Deone Walker	Kentucky	DL	So.	
Outland Trophy	Emery Jones	LSU	OL	So.	
Outland Trophy	Mekhi Wingo	LSU	DL	Jr.	
Outland Trophy	Will Campbell	LSU	OL	So.	
Outland Trophy	Jaden Crumedy	Mississippi State	DL	GS.	
Outland Trophy	Javon Foster	Missouri	OL	GS.	
Outland Trophy	Micah Pettus	Ole Miss	OL	So.	
Outland Trophy	Tonka Hemingway	South Carolina	DL	Sr.	
Outland Trophy	McKinnley Jackson	Texas A&M	DL	Sr.	
John Mackey Award	CJ Dippre	Alabama	TE	Jr.	
John Mackey Award	Rivaldo Fairweather	Auburn	TE	Jr.	
John Mackey Award	Brock Bowers	Georgia	TE	Jr.	
John Mackey Award	Oscar Delp	Georgia	TE	So.	
John Mackey Award	Mason Taylor	LSU	TE	So.	
John Mackey Award	Caden Prieskorn	Ole Miss	TE	Sr.	
John Mackey Award	Michael Trigg	Ole Miss	TE	So.	
John Mackey Award	Trey Knox	South Carolina	TE	GS.	
John Mackey Award	Jacob Warren	Tennessee	TE	RS Sr.	
John Mackey Award	Donovan Green	Texas A&M	TE	So.	
Rimington Trophy	Seth McLaughlin	Alabama	OL	Sr.	
Rimington Trophy	Beaux Limmer	Arkansas	OL	RS Sr.	
Rimington Trophy	Sedrick Van Pran-Granger	Georgia	OL	RS Jr.	
Rimington Trophy	Cole Smith	Georgia	OL	GS.	
Rimington Trophy	Cooper Mays	Tennessee	OL	Sr.	
Rimington Trophy	Bryce Foster	Texas A&M	OL	So.	
Biletnikoff Award	Brock Bowers	Georgia	TE	Jr.	
Biletnikoff Award	Dominic Lovett	Georgia	WR	So.	
Biletnikoff Award	Ladd McConkey	Georgia	WR	Jr.	
Biletnikoff Award	Malik Nabers	LSU	WR	Jr.	
Biletnikoff Award	Tre Harris	Ole Miss	WR	Sr.	
Biletnikoff Award	Zakhari Franklin	Ole Miss	WR	Sr.	
Biletnikoff Award	Antwane Wells Jr.	South Carolina	WR	Sr.	
Biletnikoff Award	Will Sheppard	Vanderbilt	WR	Sr.	
Davey O'Brien Award	KJ Jefferson	Arkansas	QB	Sr.	
Davey O'Brien Award	Devin Leary	Kentucky	QB	Sr.	
Davey O'Brien Award	Jayden Daniels	LSU	QB	Sr.	
Davey O'Brien Award	Will Rogers	Mississippi State	QB	Sr.	
Davey O'Brien Award	Joe Milton	Tennessee	QB	Sr.	
Doak Walker Award	Raheim Sanders	Arkansas	RB	Jr.	
Doak Walker Award	Josh Williams	LSU	RB	GS.	
Doak Walker Award	Noah Cain	LSU	RB	Sr.	
Doak Walker Award	Quinshon Judkins	Ole Miss	RB	So.	
Doak Walker Award	Jabari Small	Tennessee	RB	Sr.	
Doak Walker Award	Jaylen Wright	Tennessee	RB	Jr.	
Butkus Award	Deontae Lawson	Alabama	LB	RS So.	
Butkus Award	Chris Paul Jr.	Arkansas	LB	RS So.	
Butkus Award	Jamon Dumas-Johnson	Georgia	LB	So.	
Butkus Award	Smael Mondon Jr.	Georgia	LB	Jr.	
Butkus Award	Trevin Wallace	Kentucky	LB	Jr.	
Butkus Award	Harold Perkins Jr.	LSU	LB	So.	
Butkus Award	Omar Speights	LSU	LB	Sr.	
Butkus Award	Nathaniel Watson	Mississippi State	LB	GS.	
Butkus Award	Ty'Ron Hopper	Missouri	LB	Sr.	
Butkus Award	Khari Coleman	Ole Miss	LB	Sr.	
Butkus Award	Edgerrin Cooper	Texas A&M	LB	Jr.	
Jim Thorpe Award	Kool-Aid McKinstry	Alabama	DB	Jr.	
Jim Thorpe Award	Malaki Starks	Georgia	DB	So.	
Jim Thorpe Award	Demani Richardson	Texas A&M	DB	Sr.	
Bronko Nagurski Trophy	Dallas Turner	Alabama	LB	Jr.	
Bronko Nagurski Trophy	Kool-Aid McKinstry	Alabama	DB	Jr.	
Bronko Nagurski Trophy	Malachi Moore	Alabama	DB	Sr.	
Bronko Nagurski Trophy	Dwight McGlothern	Arkansas	DB	Sr.	
Bronko Nagurski Trophy	D. J. James	Auburn	DB	Sr.	
Bronko Nagurski Trophy	Jamon Dumas-Johnson	Georgia	LB	So.	
Bronko Nagurski Trophy	Malaki Starks	Georgia	DB	So.	
Bronko Nagurski Trophy	Mykel Williams	Georgia	DL	So.	
Bronko Nagurski Trophy	Harold Perkins Jr.	LSU	LB	So.	
Bronko Nagurski Trophy	Mekhi Wingo	LSU	DL	Jr.	
Bronko Nagurski Trophy	Deone Walker	Kentucky	DL	So.	
Bronko Nagurski Trophy	Nathaniel Watson	Mississippi State	LB	GS.	
Bronko Nagurski Trophy	Kris Abrams-Draine	Missouri	DB	Jr.	
Bronko Nagurski Trophy	Ty'Ron Hopper	Missouri	LB	Sr.	
Bronko Nagurski Trophy	Nick Emmanwori	South Carolina	DB	So.	

Award	Head Coach/Player	School	Position	Year	Ref
Lou Groza Award	Will Reichard	Alabama	PK	Sr.	
Lou Groza Award	Alex Raynor	Kentucky	PK	Sr.	
Lou Groza Award	Harrison Mevis	Missouri	PK	Sr.	
Lou Groza Award	Mitch Jeter	South Carolina	PK	Sr.	
Ray Guy Award	Oscar Chapman	Auburn	P	Sr.	
Ray Guy Award	Jeremy Crawshaw	Florida	P	Jr.	
Ray Guy Award	Brett Thorson	Georgia	P	So.	
Ray Guy Award	Jay Bramblett	LSU	P	GS.	
Ray Guy Award	Kai Kroeger	South Carolina	P	Sr.	
Ray Guy Award	Nik Constantinou	Texas A&M	P	Sr.	
Ray Guy Award	Matthew Hayball	Vanderbilt	P	GS.	
Paul Hornung Award	Brian Battie	Auburn	RB	Jr.	
Paul Hornung Award	Trevor Etienne	Florida	RB	So.	
Paul Hornung Award	Barion Brown	Kentucky	WR	So.	
Paul Hornung Award	Jayden McGowan	Vanderbilt	WR	So.	
Wuerffel Trophy	Malachi Moore	Alabama	DB	Sr.	
Wuerffel Trophy	Cam Little	Arkansas	PK	Jr.	
Wuerffel Trophy	Elijah McAllister	Auburn	LB	Sr.	
Wuerffel Trophy	Derek Wingo	Florida	LB	Jr.	
Wuerffel Trophy	J. J. Weaver	Kentucky	LB	Sr.	
Wuerffel Trophy	Josh Williams	LSU	LB	Sr.	
Wuerffel Trophy	Realus George Jr.	Missouri	DL	Sr.	
Wuerffel Trophy	Will Rogers	Mississippi State	QB	Sr.	
Wuerffel Trophy	J. J. Pegues	Ole Miss	DL	Sr.	
Wuerffel Trophy	Dakereon Joyner	South Carolina	RB	Sr.	
Wuerffel Trophy	Jacob Warren	Tennessee	TE	Sr.	
Wuerffel Trophy	Max Wright	Texas A&M	TE	Sr.	
Wuerffel Trophy	Ethan Barr	Vanderbilt	LB	Sr.	
Walter Camp Award	Kool-Aid McKinstry	Alabama	DB	Jr.	
Walter Camp Award	Raheim Sanders	Arkansas	RB	Jr.	
Walter Camp Award	Brock Bowers	Georgia	TE	Jr.	
Walter Camp Award	Harold Perkins Jr.	LSU	LB	So.	
Walter Camp Award	Jayden Daniels	LSU	QB	Sr.	
Walter Camp Award	Will Rogers	Mississippi State	QB	Sr.	
Walter Camp Award	Quinshon Judkins	Ole Miss	RB	So.	
Walter Camp Award	Joe Milton	Tennessee	QB	Sr.	
Bednarik Award	Kool-Aid McKinstry	Alabama	DB	Jr.	
Bednarik Award	Dallas Turner	Alabama	LB	Jr.	
Bednarik Award	D. J. James	Auburn	DB	Sr.	
Bednarik Award	Princely Umanmielen	Florida	DL	Jr.	
Bednarik Award	Javon Bullard	Georgia	DB	Jr.	
Bednarik Award	Jamon Dumas-Johnson	Georgia	LB	Jr.	
Bednarik Award	J. J. Weaver	Kentucky	LB	Sr.	
Bednarik Award	Harold Perkins Jr.	LSU	LB	So.	
Bednarik Award	Nathaniel Watson	Mississippi State	LB	GS.	
Bednarik Award	Ty'Ron Hopper	Missouri	LB	GS.	
Bednarik Award	Cedric Johnson	Ole Miss	DL	GS.	
Bednarik Award	Aaron Beasley	Tennessee	LB	GS.	
Rotary Lombardi Award	Dallas Turner	Alabama	LB	Jr.	
Rotary Lombardi Award	JC Latham	Alabama	OL	Jr.	
Rotary Lombardi Award	Beau Limmer	Arkansas	OL	RS Sr.	
Rotary Lombardi Award	Princely Umanmielen	Florida	DL	Jr.	
Rotary Lombardi Award	Brock Bowers	Georgia	TE	Jr.	
Rotary Lombardi Award	Jamon Dumas-Johnson	Georgia	LB	Jr.	
Rotary Lombardi Award	Tate Ratledge	Georgia	OL	Jr.	
Rotary Lombardi Award	Mykel Williams	Georgia	DL	So.	
Rotary Lombardi Award	Sedrick Van Pran-Granger	Georgia	OL	RSSo.	
Rotary Lombardi Award	Mekhi Wingo	LSU	DL	Jr.	
Rotary Lombardi Award	Harold Perkins Jr.	LSU	LB	So.	
Rotary Lombardi Award	Javon Foster	Missouri	OL	GS.	
Rotary Lombardi Award	Nathaniel Watson	Mississippi State	LB	GS.	
Rotary Lombardi Award	McKinnley Jackson	Texas A&M	DL	Sr.	
Patrick Mannelly Award	Kneeland Hibbett	Alabama	LS	Jr.	
Patrick Mannelly Award	Eli Stein	Arkansas	LS	So.	
Patrick Mannelly Award	William Mote	Georgia	LS	Jr.	
Patrick Mannelly Award	Slade Roy	LSU	LS	Jr.	
Patrick Mannelly Award	Hunter Rogers	South Carolina	LS	Jr.	
Patrick Mannelly Award	Wesley Schelling	Vanderbilt	LS	Sr.	
Earl Campbell Tyler Rose Award	Jase McClellan	Alabama	RB	Sr.	
Earl Campbell Tyler Rose Award	Josh Williams	LSU	RB	Sr.	
Earl Campbell Tyler Rose Award	Ulysses Bentley IV	Ole Miss	RB	Sr.	
Earl Campbell Tyler Rose Award	Zakhari Franklin	Ole Miss	WR	Sr.	
Earl Campbell Tyler Rose Award	Ainias Smith	Texas A&M	WR	GS.	
Polynesian College Football Player Of The Year Award	Mosiah Nasili-Kite	Auburn	DL	(redshirt) Sr.	
Polynesian College Football Player Of The Year Award	Keenan Pili	Tennessee	LB	(redshirt) Sr.	
Manning Award	KJ Jefferson	Arkansas	QB	Sr.	
Manning Award	Jayden Daniels	LSU	QB	Sr.	
Manning Award	Will Rogers	Mississippi State	QB	Sr.	
Manning Award	Spencer Rattler	South Carolina	QB	Sr.	
Johnny Unitas Golden Arm Award	KJ Jefferson	Arkansas	QB	Sr.	
Johnny Unitas Golden Arm Award	Payton Thorne	Auburn	QB	Jr.	
Johnny Unitas Golden Arm Award	Graham Mertz	Florida	QB	RsJr.	
Johnny Unitas Golden Arm Award	Devin Leary	Kentucky	QB	Sr.	
Johnny Unitas Golden Arm Award	Jayden Daniels	LSU	QB	Sr.	
Johnny Unitas Golden Arm Award	Will Rogers	Mississippi State	QB	Sr.	
Johnny Unitas Golden Arm Award	Jaxson Dart	Ole Miss	QB	Jr.	
Johnny Unitas Golden Arm Award	Spencer Rattler	South Carolina	QB	Sr.	
Johnny Unitas Golden Arm Award	Joe Milton	Tennessee	QB	Sr.	

==== Preseason All-SEC ====
===== Media =====
First Team

Position	Player	Class	Team
First Team Offense
QB	Jayden Daniels	Sr.	LSU
RB	Quinshon Judkins	So.	Ole Miss
RB	Raheim Sanders	Jr.	Arkansas
WR	Ladd McConkey	RS So.	Georgia
WR	Malik Nabers	Jr.	LSU
TE	Brock Bowers	Jr.	Georgia
OL	JC Latham	Jr.	Alabama
OL	Amarius Mims	Jr.	Georgia
OL	Tate Ratledge	Jr.	Georgia
OL	Will Campbell	So.	LSU
C	Sedrick Van Pran-Granger	RS Jr.	Georgia
First Team Defense
DL	Mekhi Wingo	Jr.	LSU
DL	Mykel Williams	So.	Georgia
DL	Maason Smith	RS So.	LSU
DL	Nazir Stackhouse	Sr.	Georgia
LB	Dallas Turner	Jr.	Alabama
LB	Harold Perkins	So.	LSU
LB	Jamon Dumas-Johnson	Jr.	Georgia
DB	Kool-Aid McKinstry	Jr.	Alabama
DB	Malaki Starks	So.	Georgia
DB	Kamari Lassiter	Jr.	Georgia
DB	Javon Bullard	Jr.	Georgia
First Team Special Teams
PK	Will Reichard	GS	Alabama
P	Kai Kroeger	Jr.	South Carolina
LS	Kneeland Hibbett	Jr.	Alabama
RS	Kool-Aid McKinstry	Jr.	Alabama
AP	Ainias Smith	GS	Texas A&M

Second Team

Position	Player	Class	Team
Second Team Offense
QB	KJ Jefferson	Sr.	Arkansas
RB	Jase McClellan	Sr.	Alabama
RB	Kendall Milton	Sr.	Georgia
WR	Antwane Wells Jr.	Jr.	South Carolina
WR	Bru McCoy	RS Sr.	Tennessee
WR	Ja'Corey Brooks	Jr.	Alabama
TE	Mason Taylor	So.	LSU
OL	Tyler Booker	GS	Alabama
OL	Brady Latham	Sr.	Arkansas
OL	Javon Foster	Sr.	Missouri
OL	Xavier Truss	Sr.	Georgia
C	Seth McLaughlin	Sr.	Alabama
Second Team Defense
DL	Jaheim Oatis	So.	Alabama
DL	Justin Eboigbe	GS	Alabama
DL	Deone Walker	So.	Kentucky
DL	McKinnley Jackson	Sr.	Texas A&M
LB	Smael Mondon Jr.	Jr.	Georgia
LB	Nathaniel Watson	Sr.	Mississippi State
LB	Ty'Ron Hopper	Jr.	Missouri
DB	Malachi Moore	Sr.	Alabama
DB	Dwight McGlothern	Sr.	Arkansas
DB	Kris Abrams-Draine	Jr.	Missouri
DB	Demani Richardson	Sr.	Texas A&M
Second Team Special Teams
PK	Harrison Mevis	Sr.	Missouri
P	Nik Constantinou	Sr.	Texas A&M
KS	Barion Brown	So.	Kentucky
LS	Slade Roy	Jr.	LSU
RS	Ainias Smith	GS	Texas A&M
AP	Tulu Griffin	Sr.	Mississippi State

Third Team

Position	Player	Class	Team
Third Team Offense
QB	Joe Milton	Sr.	Tennessee
QB	Will Rogers	Sr.	Mississippi State
RB	Jarquez Hunter	Jr.	Auburn
RB	Trevor Etienne	So.	Florida
WR	Ainias Smith	GS	Texas A&M
WR	Jermaine Burton	Sr.	Alabama
TE	Trey Knox	GS	South Carolina
OL	Emery Jones	So.	LSU
OL	Eli Cox	Sr.	Kentucky
OL	Cooper Mays	Sr.	Tennessee
OL	Javontez Spraggins	Sr.	Tennessee
OL	Layden Robinson	Sr.	Texas A&M
Third Team Defense
DL	Tim Smith	Sr.	Alabama
DL	Princely Umanmielen	Jr.	Florida
DL	Darius Robinson	Sr.	Missouri
DL	Tonka Hemingway	Jr.	South Carolina
LB	Chris Braswell	Sr.	Alabama
LB	Jalon Walker	So.	Georgia
LB	J. J. Weaver	Sr.	Kentucky
DB	Malachi Moore	Sr.	Alabama
DB	Nehemiah Pritchett	Sr.	Auburn
DB	Jason Marshall Jr.	Jr.	Florida
DB	Major Burns	Jr.	LSU
Third Team Special Teams
PK	Alex McPherson	RS Fr.	Auburn
P	Oscar Chapman	Sr.	Auburn
KS	Mitch Jeter	Jr.	South Carolina
LS	William Mote	Sr.	Georgia
RS	Tulu Griffin	Sr.	Mississippi State
AP	Dakereon Joyner	Sr.	South Carolina

===== Coaches =====
First Team

Position	Player	Class	Team
First Team Offense
QB	Jayden Daniels	Sr.	LSU
RB	Quinshon Judkins	So.	Ole Miss
RB	Raheim Sanders	Jr.	Arkansas
WR	Ladd McConkey	RS So.	Georgia
WR	Antwane Wells Jr.	Sr.	South Carolina
WR	Malik Nabers	Jr.	LSU
TE	Brock Bowers	Jr.	Georgia
OL	JC Latham	Jr.	Alabama
OL	Amarius Mims	Jr.	Georgia
OL	Tate Ratledge	Jr.	Georgia
OL	Will Campbell	So.	LSU
C	Sedrick Van Pran-Granger	RS Jr.	Georgia
First Team Defense
DL	Mekhi Wingo	Jr.	LSU
DL	Mykel Williams	So.	Georgia
DL	Maason Smith	RS So.	LSU
DL	Nazir Stackhouse	Sr.	Georgia
LB	Dallas Turner	Jr.	Alabama
LB	Harold Perkins	So.	LSU
LB	Jamon Dumas-Johnson	Jr.	Georgia
DB	Kool-Aid McKinstry	Jr.	Alabama
DB	Malaki Starks	So.	Georgia
DB	Javon Bullard	Jr.	Georgia
DB	Dwight McGlothern	Sr.	Arkansas
First Team Special Teams
PK	Will Reichard	GS	Alabama
P	Kai Kroeger	Jr.	South Carolina
LS	Wesley Schilling	Sr.	Vanderbilt
KOS	Mitch Jeter	Sr.	South Carolina
RS	Kool-Aid McKinstry	Jr.	Alabama
AP	Ainias Smith	GS	Texas A&M

Second Team

Position	Player	Class	Team
Second Team Offense
QB	KJ Jefferson	Sr.	Arkansas
RB	Jase McClellan	Sr.	Alabama
RB	Kendall Milton	Sr.	Georgia
WR	Evan Stewart	So.	Texas A&M
WR	Bru McCoy	RS Sr.	Tennessee
WR	Jermaine Burton	Sr.	Alabama
WR	Will Sheppard	Sr.	Vanderbilt
TE	Mason Taylor	So.	LSU
OL	Tyler Booker	GS	Alabama
OL	Brady Latham	Sr.	Arkansas
OL	Javon Foster	Sr.	Missouri
OL	Xavier Truss	Sr.	Georgia
OL	Emery Jones	So.	LSU
C	Seth McLaughlin	Sr.	Alabama
Second Team Defense
DL	Jaheim Oatis	So.	Alabama
DL	Justin Eboigbe	GS	Alabama
DL	Deone Walker	So.	Kentucky
DL	McKinnley Jackson	Sr.	Texas A&M
LB	Smael Mondon Jr.	Jr.	Georgia
LB	Nathaniel Watson	GS	Mississippi State
LB	J. J. Weaver	Sr.	Kentucky
DB	Malachi Moore	Sr.	Alabama
DB	Kamari Lassiter	So.	Georgia
DB	Kris Abrams-Draine	Jr.	Missouri
DB	Demani Richardson	Sr.	Texas A&M
Second Team Special Teams
PK	Harrison Mevis	Sr.	Missouri
P	Nik Constantinou	Sr.	Texas A&M
KS	Nathan Dibert	So.	LSU
LS	Kneeland Hibbett	Jr.	Alabama
RS	Ainias Smith	GS	Texas A&M
AP	Tulu Griffin	Sr.	Mississippi State

Third Team

Position	Player	Class	Team
Third Team Offense
QB	Will Rogers	Sr.	Mississippi State
RB	Jarquez Hunter	Jr.	Auburn
RB	Trevor Etienne	So.	Florida
WR	Ainias Smith	GS	Texas A&M
WR	Ja'Corey Brooks	Jr.	Alabama
WR	Luther Burden III	So.	Missouri
TE	Trey Knox	GS	South Carolina
TE	Luke Deal	Sr.	Arkansas
TE	Caden Prieskorn	Sr.	Ole Miss
TE	Michael Trigg	Jr.	Ole Miss
OL	Kam Stutts	Sr.	Auburn
OL	Eli Cox	Sr.	Kentucky
OL	Jeremy James	Sr.	Ole Miss
OL	Micah Pettus	So.	Ole Miss
OL	Cooper Mays	Sr.	Tennessee
OL	Javontez Spraggins	Sr.	Tennessee
OL	Layden Robinson	Sr.	Texas A&M
Third Team Defense
DL	Tim Smith	Sr.	Alabama
DL	Princely Umanmielen	Jr.	Florida
DL	Darius Robinson	Sr.	Missouri
DL	Jared Ivey	Sr.	Ole Miss
DL	Tonka Hemingway	Jr.	South Carolina
LB	Chris Braswell	Sr.	Alabama
LB	Ty'Ron Hopper	Jr.	Missouri
LB	Jett Johnson	GS	Mississippi State
DB	Marcellas Dial	RS Sr.	South Carolina
DB	Nehemiah Pritchett	Sr.	Auburn
DB	Jason Marshall Jr.	Jr.	Florida
DB	Greg Brooks Jr.	Sr.	LSU
Third Team Special Teams
PK	Cam Little	Jr.	Arkansas
P	Oscar Chapman	Sr.	Auburn
P	Matthew Hayball	GS	Vanderbilt
LS	Slade Roy	Jr.	LSU
RS	Tulu Griffin	Sr.	Mississippi State
AP	Dakereon Joyner	Sr.	South Carolina

== Head coaches ==
=== Pre-season changes ===
Auburn head coach Bryan Harsin was fired after posting a 9–12 record with the school over two years. Cadillac Williams was named the interim head coach for the remainder of the season. On November 28, Auburn announced that they had signed Liberty head coach Hugh Freeze to take over their head coaching position beginning in 2023.

Mississippi State head coach Mike Leach died after suffering a major heart attack. Mississippi State still elected to play in their bowl game. Defensive coordinator Zach Arnett was named interim head coach during Leach's hospitalization and promoted to permanent head coach after Leach's death.

=== Coaches ===
Note: All stats current through the completion of the 2023 season

School	Coach	Year
Alabama	Nick Saban	17th
Arkansas	Sam Pittman	4th
Auburn	Hugh Freeze	1st
Florida	Billy Napier	2nd
Georgia	Kirby Smart	8th
Kentucky	Mark Stoops	11th
LSU	Brian Kelly	2nd
Mississippi State	Zach Arnett	1st
Missouri	Eliah Drinkwitz	4th
Ole Miss	Lane Kiffin	4th
South Carolina	Shane Beamer	3rd
Tennessee	Josh Heupel	3rd
Texas A&M	Jimbo Fisher	6th
Vanderbilt	Clark Lea	3rd

=== Mid-season changes ===
- On November 12, 2023, Texas A&M fired head coach Jimbo Fisher with three weeks remaining in the season following a 6–4 start. He held the position since 2018 after serving as the head coach for Florida State from 2010 to 2017. His $77.5 million buyout was the largest buyout in college football history. Elijah Robinson was named interim head coach and lead the team to a 1–2 record including a Texas Bowl loss to Oklahoma State.
- On November 13, 2023, Mississippi State fired head coach Zach Arnett with two weeks remaining in the season following a 4–6 start. He had held the position since Mike Leach's death before the team's bowl game the previous year. Greg Knox was named interim head coach, a position he had held for Mississippi State in 2017 and for Florida in 2021. He led the team to a 1–1 record.

=== Post-season changes ===
- On January 10, 2024, Alabama head coach Nick Saban retired after posting a 201–29 record with the school. Kalen DeBoer was hired as his successor following a trip to the 2023 College Football Playoff National Championship with Washington in 2023. He was also the head coach for Sioux Falls—where he won three NAIA Football National Championships—from 2005 to 2009 and Fresno State from 2020 to 2021.

== Rankings ==
		Pre	Wk 1	Wk 2	Wk 3	Wk 4	Wk 5	Wk 6	Wk 7	Wk 8	Wk 9	Wk 10	Wk 11	Wk 12	Wk 13	Wk 14	Final
Alabama	AP	4	3	10	13	12	11	11	11	9	8	8	8	8	8	5	5
Alabama	C	3 (4)	3 (2)	10	12	11	10	10	8	8	8	8	8	8	8	т4 (3)	5
Alabama	CFP	Not released									8	8	8	8	8	4	
Arkansas	AP	RV	RV	RV													
Arkansas	C	RV	RV	RV	RV												
Arkansas	CFP	Not released															
Auburn	AP	RV	RV		RV												
Auburn	C	RV	RV	RV	RV												
Auburn	CFP	Not released															
Florida	AP	RV			25	22			RV	RV							
Florida	C	RV			RV	23	RV	RV	RV	RV	RV						
Florida	CFP	Not released															
Georgia	AP	1 (60)	1 (58)	1 (55)	1 (57)	1 (55)	1 (35)	1 (50)	1 (43)	1 (38)	1 (48)	1 (49)	1 (54)	1 (61)	1 (52)	6	4
Georgia	C	1 (61)	1 (63)	1 (64)	1 (62)	1 (61)	1 (59)	1 (61)	1 (58)	1 (58)	1 (58)	1 (55)	1 (58)	1 (61)	1 (59)	6	3
Georgia	CFP	Not released									2	2	1	1	1	6	
Kentucky	AP	RV	RV	RV	RV	RV	20	24	RV	RV					RV	RV	RV
Kentucky	C	RV	RV	RV	RV	RV	20	23	RV	RV	RV	RV					
Kentucky	CFP	Not released															
LSU	AP	5	14	14	12	13	23	22	19	15	13	18	15	14	13	13	12
LSU	C	5	14	14	13	12	23	20	19	15	13	19	15	14	13	13	12
LSU	CFP	Not released									14	19	15	14	13	13	
Mississippi State	AP	RV	RV	RV													
Mississippi State	C	RV	RV	RV													
Mississippi State	CFP	Not released															
Missouri	AP				RV	23	21	RV	20	16	14	16	11	10	9	9	8
Missouri	C	RV	RV	RV	RV	22	22	25	20	16	14	15	11	10	9	9	8
Missouri	CFP	Not released									12	14	9	9	9	9	
Ole Miss	AP	22	20	17	15	20	16	13	13	12	11	10	13	12	11	11	9
Ole Miss	C	22	20	19	16	20	15	13	12	11	10	10	14	12	11	11	9
Ole Miss	CFP	Not released									10	9	13	12	11	11	
South Carolina	AP	RV															
South Carolina	C	RV	RV	RV													
South Carolina	CFP	Not released															
Tennessee	AP	12	9	11	23	21	22	19	17	21	19	14	21	25	RV	25	17
Tennessee	C	10	9	9	20	19	18	17	15	20	16	12	19	23	23	23	17
Tennessee	CFP	Not released									17	13	18	21	21	21	
Texas A&M	AP	23	23			RV	RV	RV				RV	RV	RV			
Texas A&M	C	25	23	RV	RV	RV	RV	RV	RV					RV			
Texas A&M	CFP	Not released															
Vanderbilt	AP																
Vanderbilt	C																
Vanderbilt	CFP	Not released															

Legend
	Improvement in ranking
	Drop in ranking
	Not ranked previous week
	No change in ranking from previous week
RV	Received votes but were not ranked in Top 25 of poll
т	Tied with team above or below also with this symbol

== Schedules ==
Index to colors and formatting
SEC member won
SEC member lost
SEC teams in **bold**

All times Central time.

† denotes Homecoming game

Rankings reflect those of the AP poll for weeks 1 through 9. Rankings from Week 10 until the end of the Season reflect those of the College Football Playoff Rankings.

== Regular season ==
The schedule was released on September 20, 2022. The season will begin on August 31, 2023, and will end with the SEC Championship Game on December 2, 2023.

=== Week Zero ===
Date	Time	Visiting team	Home team	Site	TV	Result	Attendance	Ref.
August 26	7:30 p.m.	Hawaii	**Vanderbilt**	FirstBank Stadium • Nashville, TN	SECN	**W** 35–28	21,407	
^{#}Rankings from AP Poll released prior to game. All times are in Eastern Time.

=== Week One ===
Date	Time	Visiting team	Home team	Site	TV	Result	Attendance	Ref.
August 31	8:00 p.m.	**Florida**	No. 14 Utah	Rice–Eccles Stadium • Salt Lake City, UT	ESPN	**L** 11–24	53,644	
August 31	8:00 p.m.	South Dakota	**Missouri**	Faurot Field • Columbia, MO	SECN	**W** 35–10	50,434	
September 2	12:00 p.m.	Ball State	**Kentucky**	Kroger Field • Lexington, KY	SECN	**W** 44–14	58,286	
September 2	12:00 p.m.	Virginia	No. 12 **Tennessee**	Nissan Stadium • Nashville, TN	ABC	**W** 49–13	69,507	
September 2	1:00 p.m.	Western Carolina	**Arkansas**	War Memorial Stadium • Little Rock, AR	ESPN+/SECN+	**W** 56–13	44,397	
September 2	2:00 p.m.	No. 20 (FCS) Mercer	No. 22 **Ole Miss**	Vaught–Hemingway Stadium • University, MS	ESPN+/SECN+	**W** 73–7	60,097	
September 2	3:30 p.m.	UMass	**Auburn**	Jordan-Hare Stadium • Auburn, AL	ESPN	**W** 59–14	88,043	
September 2	4:00 p.m.	No. 15 (FCS) Southeastern Louisiana	**Mississippi State**	Davis Wade Stadium • Mississippi State, MS	SECN	**W** 48–7	50,041	
September 2	6:00 p.m.	UT Martin	No. 1 **Georgia**	Sanford Stadium • Athens, GA	ESPN+/SECN+	**W** 48–7	92,746	
September 2	7:00 p.m.	New Mexico	No. 23 **Texas A&M**	Kyle Field • College Station, TX	ESPN	**W** 52–10	97,560	
September 2	7:00 p.m.	Alabama A&M	**Vanderbilt**	FirstBank Stadium • Nashville, TN	ESPN+/SECN+	**W** 47–13	22,035	
September 2	7:30 p.m.	Middle Tennessee	No. 4 **Alabama**	Bryant Denny Stadium • Tuscaloosa, AL	SECN	**W** 56–7	100,027	
September 2	7:30 p.m.	**South Carolina**	No. 21 North Carolina	Bank of America Stadium • Charlotte, NC (Duke's Mayo Classic / Rivalry)	ABC	**L** 17–31	68,723	
September 3	7:30 p.m.	No. 5 **LSU**	No. 8 Florida State	Camping World Stadium • Orlando, FL (Camping World Kickoff)	ABC	**L** 24–45	65,429	
^{#}Rankings from AP Poll released prior to game. All times are in Eastern Time.

=== Week Two ===
Date	Time	Visiting team	Home team	Site	TV	Result	Attendance	Ref.
September 9	11:00 a.m.	**Vanderbilt**	Wake Forest	Allegacy Federal Credit Union Stadium • Winston-Salem, NC	ACCN	**L** 20–36	28,363	
September 9	12:00 p.m.	Ball State	No. 1 **Georgia**	Sanford Stadium • Athens, GA	SECN	**W** 45–3	92,746	
September 9	3:00 p.m.	Eastern Kentucky	**Kentucky**	Kroger Field • Lexington, KY	SECN+/ESPN+	**W** 28–17	61,876	
September 9	3:30 p.m.	No. 23 **Texas A&M**	Miami	Hard Rock Stadium • Miami Gardens, FL	ABC	**L** 33–48	48,792	
September 9	3:30 p.m.	No. 20 **Ole Miss**	Tulane	Yulman Stadium • New Orleans, LA	ESPN2	**W** 37–20	30,000	
September 9	4:00 p.m.	Kent State	**Arkansas**	Donald W. Reynolds Stadium • Fayetteville, AR	SECN	**W** 28–6	73,173	
September 9	5:00 p.m.	Austin Peay	No. 9 **Tennessee**	Neyland Stadium • Knoxville, TN	SECN+/ESPN+	**W** 30–13	101,915	
September 9	7:00 p.m.	No. 11 Texas	No. 3 **Alabama**	Bryant–Denny Stadium • Tuscaloosa, AL	ESPN	**L** 24–34	100,077	
September 9	7:00 p.m.	Middle Tennessee	**Missouri**	Faurot Field • Columbia, MO	SECN+/ESPN+	**W** 23–19	57,645	
September 9	7:30 p.m.	McNeese State	**Florida**	Ben Hill Griffin Stadium • Gainesville, FL	ESPNU	**W** 49–7	88,163	
September 9	7:30 p.m.	Grambling State	No. 14 **LSU**	Tiger Stadium • Baton Rouge, LA	SECN+/ESPN+	**W** 72–10	97,735	
September 9	7:30 p.m.	Arizona	**Mississippi State**	Davis Wade Stadium • Mississippi State, MS	SECN	**W** 31–24 ^{OT}	51,648	
September 9	7:30 p.m.	No. 6 (FCS) Furman	**South Carolina**	Williams-Brice Stadium • Columbia, SC	SECN+/ESPN+	**W** 47–21	78,281	
September 9	10:30 p.m.	**Auburn**	California	California Memorial Stadium • Berkeley, CA	ESPN	**W** 14–10	44,141	
^{#}Rankings from AP Poll released prior to game. All times are in Eastern Time.

=== Week Three ===
Date	Time	Visiting team	Home team	Site	TV	Result	Attendance	Ref.
September 16	12:00 p.m.	No. 14 **LSU**	**Mississippi State**	Davis Wade Stadium • Mississippi State, MS (Rivalry)	ESPN	**LSU** 41–14	60,084	
September 16	12:00 p.m.	No. 15 Kansas State	**Missouri**	Faurot Field • Columbia, MO	SECN	**W** 30–27	62,621	
September 16	3:30 p.m.	**South Carolina**	No. 1 **Georgia**	Sanford Stadium • Athens, GA (Rivalry)	CBS	**UGA** 24–14	92,746	
September 16	3:30 p.m.	No. 10 **Alabama**	South Florida	Raymond James Stadium • Tampa, FL	ABC	**W** 17–3	65,138	
September 16	4:00 p.m.	Louisiana-Monroe	**Texas A&M**	Kyle Field • College Station, TX	SECN	**W** 47–3	93,090	
September 16	7:00 p.m.	No. 11 **Tennessee**	**Florida**	Ben Hill Griffin Stadium • Gainesville, FL (Rivalry)	ESPN	**FLA** 29–16	90,751	
September 16	7:00 p.m.	**Vanderbilt**	UNLV	Allegiant Stadium • Paradise, NV	CBSSN	**L** 37–40	22,582	
September 16	7:30 p.m.	BYU	**Arkansas**	Donald W. Reynolds Razorback Stadium • Fayetteville, AR	ESPN2	**L** 31–38	74,821	
September 16	7:30 p.m.	No. 18 (FCS) Samford	**Auburn**	Jordan-Hare Stadium • Auburn, AL	SECN+/ESPN+	**W** 45–13	88,043	
September 16	7:30 p.m.	Akron	**Kentucky**	Kroger Field • Lexington, KY	ESPNU	**W** 35–3	59,456	
September 16	7:30 p.m.	Georgia Tech	No. 17 **Ole Miss**	Vaught–Hemingway Stadium • University, MS	SECN	**W** 48–23	64,150	
^{#}Rankings from AP Poll released prior to game. All times are in Eastern Time.

=== Week Four ===
Date	Time	Visiting team	Home team	Site	TV	Result	Attendance	Ref.
September 23	12:00 p.m.	**Auburn**	**Texas A&M**	Kyle Field • College Station, TX	ESPN	**TAMU** 27–10	102,530	
September 23	12:00 p.m.	**Kentucky**	**Vanderbilt**	FirstBank Stadium • Nashville, TN (Rivalry)	SECN	**UK** 45–28	26,279	
September 23	3:30 p.m.	No. 15 **Ole Miss**	No. 13 **Alabama**	Bryant–Denny Stadium • Tuscaloosa, AL (Rivalry)	CBS	**ALA** 24–10	100,077	
September 23	4:00 p.m.	UTSA	No. 23 **Tennessee**	Neyland Stadium • Knoxville, TN	SECN	**W** 45–14	101,915	
September 23	7:00 p.m.	**Arkansas**	No. 12 **LSU**	Tiger Stadium • Baton Rouge, LA (Rivalry)	ESPN	**LSU** 34–31	99,648	
September 23	7:00 p.m.	Charlotte	No. 25 **Florida**	Ben Hill Griffin Stadium • Gainesville, FL	ESPN+/SECN+	**W** 22–7	89,053	
September 23	7:30 p.m.	UAB	No. 1 **Georgia**	Sanford Stadium • Athens, GA	ESPN2	**W** 49–21	92,746	
September 23	7:30 p.m.	Memphis	**Missouri**	The Dome at America's Center • St. Louis, MO	ESPNU	**W** 34–27	45,085	
September 23	7:30 p.m.	**Mississippi State**	**South Carolina**	Williams–Brice Stadium • Columbia, SC	SECN	**SCAR** 37–30	78,311	
^{#}Rankings from AP Poll released prior to game. All times are in Eastern Time.

=== Week Five ===
Date	Time	Visiting team	Home team	Site	TV	Result	Attendance	Ref.
September 30	12:00 p.m.	No. 22 **Florida**	**Kentucky**	Kroger Field • Lexington, KY	ESPN	**UK** 33–14	61,699	
September 30	12:00 p.m.	**Arkansas**	**Texas A&M**	AT&T Stadium • Arlington, TX (Southwest Classic)	SECN	**TAMU** 34–22	59,437	
September 30	3:30 p.m.	No. 1 **Georgia**	**Auburn**	Jordan–Hare Stadium • Auburn, AL (Deep South's Oldest Rivalry)	CBS	**UGA** 27–20	88,043	
September 30	4:00 p.m.	No. 23 **Missouri**	**Vanderbilt**	FirstBank Stadium • Nashville, TN	SECN	**MIZZOU** 38–21	26,332	
September 30	6:00 p.m.	No. 13 **LSU**	No. 20 **Ole Miss**	Vaught–Hemingway Stadium • University, MS (Magnolia Bowl)	ESPN	**MISS** 55–49	66,703	
September 30	7:30 p.m.	**South Carolina**	No. 21 **Tennessee**	Neyland Stadium • Knoxville, TN	SECN	**TENN** 41–20	101,915	
September 30	9:00 p.m.	No. 12 **Alabama**	**Mississippi State**	Davis Wade Stadium • Mississippi State, MS	ESPN	**ALA** 40–17	60,111	
^{#}Rankings from AP Poll released prior to game. All times are in Eastern Time.

=== Week Six ===
Date	Time	Visiting team	Home team	Site	TV	Result	Attendance	Ref.
October 7	12:00 p.m.	No. 23 **LSU**	No. 21 **Missouri**	Faurot Field • Columbia, MO	ESPN	**LSU** 49–39	62,621	
October 7	12:00 p.m.	Western Michigan	**Mississippi State**	Davis Wade Stadium • Mississippi State, MS	SECN	**W** 41–28	47,158	
October 7	3:30 p.m.	No. 11 **Alabama**	**Texas A&M**	Kyle Field • College Station, TX	CBS	**ALA** 26–20	108,101	
October 7	4:00 p.m.	**Vanderbilt**	**Florida**	Ben Hill Griffin Stadium • Gainesville, FL	SECN	**FLA** 38–14	89,432	
October 7	7:00 p.m.	No. 20 **Kentucky**	No. 1 **Georgia**	Sanford Stadium • Athens, GA	ESPN	**UGA** 51–13	92,746	
October 7	7:30 p.m.	**Arkansas**	No. 16 **Ole Miss**	Vaught–Hemingway Stadium • University, MS (Rivalry)	SECN	**MISS** 27–20	65,748	
^{#}Rankings from AP Poll released prior to game. All times are in Eastern Time.

Date	Bye Week		
October 7	**Auburn**	**South Carolina**	No. 22 **Tennessee**

=== Week Seven ===
Date	Time	Visiting team	Home team	Site	TV	Result	Attendance	Ref.
October 14	12:00 p.m.	No. 1 **Georgia**	**Vanderbilt**	FirstBank Stadium • Nashville, TN	CBS	**UGA** 37–20	28,500	
October 14	12:00 p.m.	**Arkansas**	No. 11 **Alabama**	Bryant–Denny Stadium • Tuscaloosa, AL	ESPN	**ALA** 24–21	100,077	
October 14	3:30 p.m.	**Texas A&M**	No. 19 **Tennessee**	Neyland Stadium • Knoxville, TN	CBS	**TENN** 20–13	101,915	
October 14	3:30 p.m.	**Florida**	**South Carolina**	Williams–Brice Stadium • Columbia, SC	SECN	**FLA** 41–39	79,247	
October 14	7:00 p.m.	**Auburn**	No. 22 **LSU**	Tiger Stadium • Baton Rouge, LA	ESPN	**LSU** 48–18	102,321	
October 14	7:30 p.m.	**Missouri**	No. 24 **Kentucky**	Kroger Field • Lexington, KY	SECN	**MIZZOU** 38–21	61,654	
^{#}Rankings from AP Poll released prior to game. All times are in Eastern Time.

Date	Bye Week	
October 14	**Mississippi State**	No. 13 **Ole Miss**

=== Week Eight ===
Date	Time	Visiting team	Home team	Site	TV	Result	Attendance	Ref.
October 21	12:00 p.m.	**Mississippi State**	**Arkansas**	Donald W. Reynolds Razorback Stadium • Fayetteville, AR	ESPN	**MSST** 7–3	71,505	
October 21	3:30 p.m.	No. 17 **Tennessee**	No. 11 **Alabama**	Bryant–Denny Stadium • Tuscaloosa, AL (Third Saturday in October)	CBS	**ALA** 34–20	100,077	
October 21	3:30 p.m.	**South Carolina**	No. 20 **Missouri**	Faurot Field • Columbia, MO (Mayor's Cup)	SECN	**MIZZOU** 34–12	62,621	
October 21	7:00 p.m.	No. 13 **Ole Miss**	**Auburn**	Jordan–Hare Stadium • Auburn, AL (Rivalry)	ESPN	**MISS** 28–21	63,523	
October 21	7:30 p.m.	Army	No. 19 **LSU**	Tiger Stadium • Baton Rouge, LA	SECN	**W** 62–0	101,776	
^{#}Rankings from AP Poll released prior to game. All times are in Eastern Time.

Date	Bye Week				
October 21	**Florida**	No. 1 **Georgia**	**Kentucky**	**Texas A&M**	**Vanderbilt**

=== Week Nine ===
Date	Time	Visiting team	Home team	Site	TV	Result	Attendance	Ref.
October 28	12:00 p.m.	**South Carolina**	**Texas A&M**	Kyle Field • College Station, TX	ESPN	**TAMU** 30–17	95,297	
October 28	3:30 p.m.	No. 1 **Georgia**	**Florida**	EverBank Stadium • Jacksonville, FL (Rivalry)	CBS	**UGA** 43–20	76,251	
October 28	3:30 p.m.	**Mississippi State**	**Auburn**	Jordan–Hare Stadium • Auburn, AL	SECN	**AUB** 27–13	88,043	
October 28	7:00 p.m.	No. 21 **Tennessee**	**Kentucky**	Kroger Field • Lexington, KY (Rivalry)	ESPN	**TENN** 33–27	61,665	
October 28	7:30 p.m.	**Vanderbilt**	No. 12 **Ole Miss**	Vaught–Hemingway Stadium • University, MS (Rivalry)	SECN	**MISS** 33–7	62,914	
^{#}Rankings from AP Poll released prior to game. All times are in Eastern Time.

Date	Bye Week			
October 21	No. 9 **Alabama**	**Arkansas**	No. 15 **LSU**	No. 16 **Missouri**

=== Week Ten ===
Date	Time	Visiting team	Home team	Site	TV	Result	Attendance	Ref.
November 4	12:00 p.m.	**Texas A&M**	No. 10 **Ole Miss**	Vaught–Hemingway Stadium • University, MS	ESPN	**MISS** 38–35	65,680	
November 4	12:00 p.m.	**Arkansas**	**Florida**	Ben Hill Griffin Stadium • Gainesville, FL	ESPN2	**ARK** 36–33 ^{OT}	89,782	
November 4	12:00 p.m.	Jacksonville State	**South Carolina**	Williams–Brice Stadium • Columbia, SC	ESPNU	**W** 38–28	75,348	
November 4	12:00 p.m.	UConn	No. 17 **Tennessee**	Neyland Stadium • Knoxville, TN	SECN	**W** 59–3	101,915	
November 4	3:30 p.m.	No. 12 **Missouri**	No. 2 **Georgia**	Sanford Stadium • Athens, GA	CBS	**UGA** 30–21	92,746	
November 4	4:00 p.m.	**Auburn**	**Vanderbilt**	FirstBank Stadium • Nashville, TN	SECN	**AUB** 31–15	28,500	
November 4	7:30 p.m.	**Kentucky**	**Mississippi State**	Davis-Wade Stadium • Mississippi State, MS	SECN	**UK** 24–3	52,329	
November 4	7:45 p.m.	No. 14 **LSU**	No. 8 **Alabama**	Bryant–Denny Stadium • Tuscaloosa, AL (First Saturday in November)	CBS	**ALA** 42–28	100,077	
^{#}Rankings from College Football Playoff. All times are in Eastern Time.

=== Week Eleven ===
Date	Time	Visiting team	Home team	Site	TV	Result	Attendance	Ref.
November 11	12:00 p.m.	No. 8 **Alabama**	**Kentucky**	Kroger Field • Lexington, KY	ESPN	**ALA** 49–21	61,936	
November 11	12:00 pm	**Vanderbilt**	**South Carolina**	Williams–Brice Stadium • Columbia, SC	SECN	**SCAR** 47–6	75,682	
November 11	3:30 pm	No. 13 **Tennessee**	No. 14 **Missouri**	Faurot Field • Columbia, MO	CBS	**MIZZOU** 36–7	62,621	
November 11	4:00 p.m.	**Auburn**	**Arkansas**	Donald W. Reynolds Razorback Stadium • Fayetteville, AR	SECN	**AUB** 48–10	72,033	
November 11	7:00 pm	No. 9 **Ole Miss**	No. 2 **Georgia**	Sanford Stadium • Athens, GA	ESPN	**UGA** 52–17	92,746	
November 11	7:30 p.m.	**Mississippi State**	**Texas A&M**	Kyle Field • College Station, TX	ESPN2	**TAMU** 51–10	103,266	
November 11	7:30 pm	**Florida**	No. 19 **LSU**	Tiger Stadium • Baton Rouge, LA (Rivalry)	SECN	**LSU** 52–35	102,321	
^{#}Rankings from College Football Playoff. All times are in Eastern Time.

=== Week Twelve ===
Date	Time	Visiting team	Home team	Site	TV	Result	Attendance	Ref.
November 18	12:00 p.m.	Louisiana-Monroe	No. 13 **Ole Miss**	Vaught–Hemingway Stadium • University, MS	SECN	**W** 35–3	60,752	
November 18	12:00 p.m.	Chattanooga	No. 8 **Alabama**	Bryant–Denny Stadium • Tuscaloosa, AL	ESPN+/SECN+	**W** 66–10	100,077	
November 18	12:00 p.m.	Southern Miss	**Mississippi State**	Davis Wade Stadium • Mississippi State, MS	ESPN+/SECN+	**W** 41–20	53,855	
November 18	12:00 p.m.	Abilene Christian	**Texas A&M**	Kyle Field • College Station, TX	ESPN+/SECN+	**W** 38–10	94,794	
November 18	3:30 p.m.	No. 1 **Georgia**	No. 18 **Tennessee**	Neyland Stadium • Knoxville, TN (Rivalry)	CBS	**UGA** 38–10	101,915	
November 18	4:00 p.m.	New Mexico State	**Auburn**	Jordan–Hare Stadium • Auburn, AL	SECN	**L** 10–31	88,043	
November 18	7:30 p.m.	**Florida**	No. 9 **Missouri**	Faurot Field • Columbia, MO	ESPN	**MIZZOU** 33–31	62,621	
November 18	7:30 p.m.	**Kentucky**	**South Carolina**	Williams–Brice Stadium • Columbia, SC	SECN	**SCAR** 17–14	77,788	
November 18	7:30 p.m.	FIU	**Arkansas**	Donald W. Reynolds Razorback Stadium • Fayetteville, AR	ESPNU	**W** 44–20	61,442	
November 18	8:00 p.m.	Georgia State	No. 15 **LSU**	Tiger Stadium • Baton Rouge, LA	ESPN2	**W** 56–14	100,212	
^{#}Rankings from College Football Playoff. All times are in Eastern Time.

=== Week Thirteen ===
Date	Time	Visiting team	Home team	Site	TV	Result	Attendance	Ref.
November 23	7:30 p.m.	No. 12 **Ole Miss**	**Mississippi State**	Davis Wade Stadium • Mississippi State, MS (Egg Bowl)	ESPN	**MISS** 17–7	60,412	
November 24	4:00 p.m.	No. 9 **Missouri**	**Arkansas**	Donald W. Reynolds Razorback Stadium • Columbia, MO (Battle Line Rivalry)	CBS	**MIZZOU** 48–14		
November 25	12:00 p.m.	**Kentucky**	No. 10 Louisville	L&N Stadium • Louisville, KY (Governor's Cup)	ABC	**W** 38–31	59,225	
November 25	12:00 p.m.	**Texas A&M**	No. 14 **LSU**	Tiger Stadium • Baton Rouge, LA (Rivalry)	ESPN	**LSU** 42–30		
November 25	3:30 p.m.	No. 8 **Alabama**	**Auburn**	Jordan–Hare Stadium • Auburn, AL (Iron Bowl)	CBS	**ALA** 27–24		
November 25	3:30 p.m.	**Vanderbilt**	No. 21 **Tennessee**	Neyland Stadium • Knoxville, TN (Rivalry)	SECN	**TEN** 45–24		
November 25	7:00 p.m.	No. 5 Florida State	**Florida**	Ben Hill Griffin Stadium • Gainesville, FL (Sunshine Showdown)	ESPN	**L** 24–15		
November 25	7:30 p.m.	No. 1 **Georgia**	Georgia Tech	Bobby Dodd Stadium • Atlanta, GA (Clean, Old-Fashioned Hate)	ABC	**W** 31–23		
November 25	7:30 p.m.	No. 24 Clemson	**South Carolina**	Williams–Brice Stadium • Columbia, SC (Palmetto Bowl)	SECN	**L** 16–7		
^{#}Rankings from College Football Playoff. All times are in Eastern Time.

=== SEC Championship Game ===
Date	Time	Visiting team	Home team	Site	TV	Result	Attendance	Ref.
December 2	3:00 p.m.	No. 1 **Georgia**	No. 8 **Alabama**	Mercedes-Benz Stadium • Atlanta, GA	CBS	**ALA** 27–24	78,320	
^{#}Rankings from College Football Playoff. All times are in Eastern Time.

== Postseason ==
=== Bowl games ===
For the 2020–2025 bowl cycle, The SEC will have annually eight appearances in the following bowls: Sugar Bowl and Peach Bowl (unless they are selected for playoffs filled by a SEC and at-large team if champion is in the playoffs), Citrus Bowl, Duke's Mayo Bowl, Gator Bowl, Liberty Bowl, Music City Bowl, ReliaQuest Bowl and Texas Bowl. The SEC teams will go to a New Year's Six bowl if a team finishes higher than the champions of Power Five conferences in the final College Football Playoff rankings. The SEC champion are also eligible for the College Football Playoff if they're among the top four teams in the final CFP ranking.

Bowl Game	Date	Site	Television	Time (EST)	SEC team	Opponent	Score	Attendance
Texas Bowl	December 27, 2023	NRG Stadium • Houston, TX	ESPN	9:00 pm	**Texas A&M**	No. 20 Oklahoma State	**L** 23–31	55,212
Gator Bowl	December 29, 2023	EverBank Stadium • Jacksonville, FL	ESPN	12:00 pm	**Kentucky**	No. 22 Clemson	**L** 35–38	40,132
Music City Bowl	December 30, 2023	Nissan Stadium • Nashville, TN	ESPN	2:00 pm	**Auburn**	Maryland	**L** 13–31	50,088
ReliaQuest Bowl	January 1, 2024	Raymond James Stadium • Tampa, FL	ESPN2	12:00 pm	No. 13 **LSU**	Wisconsin	**W** 35–31	31,424
Citrus Bowl	January 1, 2024	Camping World Stadium • Orlando, FL	ABC	1:00 pm	No. 21 **Tennessee**	No. 17 Iowa	**W** 35–0	43,861
**New Year's Six Bowls**
Cotton Bowl Classic	December 29, 2023	AT&T Stadium • Arlington, Texas	ESPN	8:00 pm	No. 9 **Missouri**	No. 7 Ohio State	**W** 14–3	70,114
Peach Bowl	December 30, 2023	Mercedes-Benz Stadium • Atlanta, GA	ESPN	12:00 pm	No. 11 **Ole Miss**	No. 10 Penn State	**W** 38–24	71,230
Orange Bowl	December 30, 2023	Hard Rock Stadium • Miami Gardens, FL	ESPN	4:00 pm	No. 6 **Georgia**	No. 5 Florida State	**W** 63–3	63,324
**College Football Playoff bowl games**
Rose Bowl (semifinal)	January 1, 2024	Rose Bowl • Pasadena, CA	ESPN	5:00 p.m.	No. 4 **Alabama**	No. 1 Michigan	**L** 20–27 (OT)	96,371

Rankings are from CFP Poll. All times Central Time Zone.

=== Selection of teams ===
- Bowl eligible (9): Alabama, Auburn, Georgia, Kentucky, LSU, Missouri, Ole Miss, Tennessee, Texas A&M
- Bowl-ineligible (5): Arkansas, Florida, Mississippi State, South Carolina, Vanderbilt

== Head to head matchups ==
2023 SEC Head to head matchups
Team	Alabama	Arkansas	Auburn	Florida	Georgia	Kentucky	LSU	Missouri	Mississippi State	Ole Miss	South Carolina	Tennessee	Texas A&M	Vanderbilt
Alabama	—	0–1	0–1			0–1	0–1		0–1	0–1		0–1	0–1	
Arkansas	1–0	—	1–0	0–1			1–0	1–0	1–0	1–0			1–0	
Auburn	1–0	0–1	—		1–0		1–0		0–1	1–0			1–0	0–1
Florida		1–0		—	1–0	1–0	1–0	1–0			0–1	0–1		0–1
Georgia			0–1	0–1	—	0–1		0–1		0–1	0–1	0–1		0–1
Kentucky	1–0			0–1	1–0	—		1–0	0–1		1–0	1–0		0–1
LSU	1–0	0–1	0–1	0–1			—	0–1	0–1	1–0			0–1	
Missouri		0–1		0–1	1–0	0–1	1–0	—			0–1	0–1		0–1
Mississippi State	1–0	0–1	1–0			1–0	1–0		—	1–0	1–0		1–0	
Ole Miss	1–0	0–1	0–1		1–0		0–1		0–1	—			0–1	0–1
South Carolina				1–0	1–0	0–1		1–0	0–1		—	1–0	1–0	0–1
Tennessee	1–0			1–0	1–0	0–1		1–0			0–1	—	0–1	0–1
Texas A&M	1–0	0–1	0–1				1–0		0–1	1–0	0–1	1–0	—	
Vanderbilt			1–0	1–0	1–0	1–0		1–0		1–0	1–0	1–0		—
Total	8–0	1–7	3–5	3–5	8–0	3–5	6–2	6–2	1–7	6–2	3–5	4–4	4–4	0–8

Updated with the results of all games.

=== SEC vs Power Five matchups ===
The following games include SEC teams competing against Power Five conferences teams from the (ACC, Big Ten, Big 12, Notre Dame and Pac-12). All rankings are from the AP Poll at the time of the game.

Date	Conference	Visitor	Home	Site	Score
August 31	Pac-12	Florida	No. 14 Utah	Rice–Eccles Stadium • Salt Lake City, UT	L 11–24
September 2	ACC	No. 21 North Carolina	South Carolina†	Bank of America Stadium • Charlotte, NC (Duke's Mayo Classic/rivalry)	L 17-31
September 2	ACC	Virginia	No. 12 Tennessee†	Nissan Stadium • Nashville, TN	**W** 49–13
September 3	ACC	No. 5 LSU	No. 8 Florida State†	Camping World Stadium • Orlando, FL (Camping World Kickoff)	L 24–45
September 9	Pac-12	Arizona	Mississippi State	Davis Wade Stadium • Mississippi State, MS	**W** 31–24
September 9	Pac-12	Auburn	California	California Memorial Stadium • Berkeley, CA	**W** 14–10
September 9	Big 12	No. 11 Texas	No. 3 Alabama	Bryant-Denny Stadium • Tuscaloosa, AL	L 24–34
September 9	ACC	No. 23 Texas A&M	Miami (FL)	Hard Rock Stadium • Miami Gardens, FL	L 33–48
September 9	ACC	Vanderbilt	Wake Forest	Allegacy Federal Credit Union Stadium • Winston-Salem, NC	L 20–36
September 16	Big 12	BYU	Arkansas	Donald W. Reynolds Razorback Stadium • Fayetteville, AR	L 31–38
September 16	Big 12	Kansas State	Missouri	Faurot Field • Columbia, MO	**W** 30–27
September 16	ACC	Georgia Tech	Ole Miss	Vaught–Hemingway Stadium • University, MS	**W** 48–23
November 25	ACC	Florida State	Florida	Ben Hill Griffin Stadium • Gainesville, FL (rivalry)	L 24–15
November 25	ACC	Georgia	Georgia Tech	Bobby Dodd Stadium • Atlanta, GA(rivalry)	**W** 31–23
November 25	ACC	Kentucky	Louisville	L&N Federal Credit Union Stadium • Louisville, KY (rivalry)	**W** 38–31
November 25	ACC	Clemson	South Carolina	Williams-Brice Stadium • Columbia, SC (rivalry)	L 16–7

Note:† Denotes Neutral Site Game

=== SEC vs Group of Five matchups ===
The following games include SEC teams competing against "Group of Five" teams from the American, C-USA, MAC, Mountain West and Sun Belt.

Date	Conference	Visitor	Home	Site	Score
August 26	Mountain West	Hawaii	Vanderbilt	FirstBank Stadium • Nashville, TN	**W** 35–28
September 2	MAC	Ball State	Kentucky	Kroger Field • Lexington, KY	**W** 44–14
September 2	C-USA	Middle Tennessee	No. 4 Alabama	Bryant-Denny Stadium • Tuscaloosa, AL	**W** 56–7
September 2	Mountain West	New Mexico	No. 23 Texas A&M	Kyle Field • College Station, TX	**W** 52-10
September 9	MAC	Ball State	No. 1 Georgia	Sanford Stadium • Athens, GA	**W** 45–3
September 9	MAC	Kent State	Arkansas	Donald W. Reynolds Stadium • Fayetteville, AR	**W** 28–6
September 9	C-USA	Middle Tennessee	Missouri	Faurot Field • Columbia, MO	**W** 23–19
September 9	American	No. 20 Ole Miss	No. 24 Tulane	Yulman Stadium • New Orleans, LA	**W** 37–20
September 16	MAC	Akron	Kentucky	Kroger Field • Lexington, KY	**W** 35–3
September 16	American	Alabama	South Florida	Raymond James Stadium • Tampa, FL	**W** 17–3
September 16	Sun Belt	Louisiana-Monroe	Texas A&M	Kyle Field • College Station, TX	**W** 47–3
September 16	Mountain West	Vanderbilt	UNLV	Allegiant Stadium • Paradise, NV	L 37–40
September 23	American	Charlotte	Florida	Ben Hill Griffin Stadium • Gainesville, FL	**W** 22–7
September 23	American	Memphis	Missouri†	The Dome • St. Louis, MO	**W** 34–27
September 23	American	UAB	Georgia	Sanford Stadium • Athens, GA	**W** 49–21
September 23	American	UTSA	Tennessee	Neyland Stadium • Knoxville, TN	**W** 45–14
October 7	MAC	Western Michigan	Mississippi State	Davis Wade Stadium • Mississippi State, MS	**W** 41–28
November 4	C-USA	Jacksonville State	South Carolina	Williams-Brice Stadium • Columbia, SC	**W** 38-28
November 18	C-USA	FIU	Arkansas	Donald W. Reynolds Stadium • Fayetteville, AR	**W** 44–20
November 18	Sun Belt	Georgia State	LSU	Tiger Stadium • Baton Rouge, LA	**W** 56–14
November 18	C-USA	New Mexico State	Auburn	Jordan–Hare Stadium • Auburn, AL	L 10–31
November 18	Sun Belt	Southern Miss	Mississippi State	Davis Wade Stadium • Mississippi State, MS	**W** 41–20
November 18	Sun Belt	Louisiana-Monroe	Ole Miss	Vaught–Hemingway Stadium • University, MS	**W** 35–3

Note:† Denotes Neutral Site Game

=== SEC vs FBS independents matchups ===
The following games include SEC teams competing against FBS Independents, which includes Army, UConn and UMass.

Date	Visitor	Home	Site	Score
September 2	UMass	Auburn	Jordan-Hare Stadium • Auburn, AL	**W** 59–14
October 21	Army	LSU	Tiger Stadium • Baton Rouge, LA	**W** 62–0
November 4	UConn	Tennessee	Neyland Stadium • Knoxville, TN	**W** 59-3

=== SEC vs FCS matchups ===
The Football Championship Subdivision comprises 13 conferences and two independent programs.

Date	Conference	Visitor	Home	Site	Score
September 2	SWAC	Alabama A&M	Vanderbilt	FirstBank Stadium • Nashville, TN	**W** 47–13
September 2	Southern	Mercer	#22 Ole Miss	Vaught–Hemingway Stadium • University, MS	**W** 73–7
September 2	Missouri Valley	South Dakota	Missouri	Faurot Field • Columbia, MO	**W** 35–10
September 2	Southland	Southeastern Louisiana	Mississippi State	Davis Wade Stadium • Mississippi State, MS	**W** 48–7
September 2	Ohio Valley	UT Martin	No. 1 Georgia	Sanford Stadium • Athens, GA	**W** 48–7
September 2	Southern	Western Carolina	Arkansas	War Memorial Stadium • Little Rock, AR	**W** 56–13
September 9	United Athletic	Austin Peay	No. 9 Tennessee	Neyland Stadium • Knoxville, TN	**W** 30–13
September 9	United Athletic	Eastern Kentucky	Kentucky	Kroger Field • Lexington, KY	**W** 28–17
September 9	Southern	Furman	South Carolina	Williams-Brice Stadium • Columbia, SC	**W** 47–21
September 9	SWAC	Grambling State	No. 14 LSU	Tiger Stadium • Baton Rouge, LA	**W** 72–10
September 9	Southland	McNeese	Florida	Ben Hill Griffin Stadium • Gainesville, FL	**W** 49–7
September 16	Southern	Samford	Auburn	Jordan-Hare Stadium • Auburn, AL	**W** 45–13
November 18	United Athletic	Abilene Christian	Texas A&M	Kyle Field • College Station, TX	**W** 38–10
November 18	Southern	Chattanooga	Alabama	Bryant-Denny Stadium • Tuscaloosa, AL	**W** 66–10

=== SEC Records against other conferences ===
2023–24 records against non-conference foes:

**Regular Season**

Power Conferences 5	Record
ACC	4–6
Big 12	1–2
Pac-12	2–1
Power 5 Total	7–9
Other FBS Conferences	Record
American	6–0
C–USA	4–1
Independents (Excluding Notre Dame)	3–0
MAC	5–0
Mountain West	2–1
Sun Belt	4–0
Other FBS Total	24–2
FCS Opponents	Record
Football Championship Subdivision	14–0
Total Non-Conference Record	45–11

**Post Season**

Power Conferences 5	Record
ACC	1–1
Big Ten	4–2
Big 12	0–1
Power 5 Total	5–4
Total Bowl Record	5–4

== Television Selections ==
The Southeastern Conference has television contracts with ESPN and CBS, which allow games to be broadcast across ESPN, ESPN2, ESPNU, SECN, and CBS. Streaming broadcasts for games under SEC control are streamed on ESPN+. Alabama operates its own network, SEC Network, in conjunction with ESPN. Games under the control of other conferences fall under the contracts of the opposing conference.

Network	Wk 0	Wk 1	Wk 2	Wk 3	Wk 4	Wk 5	Wk 6	Wk 7	Wk 8	Wk 9	Wk 10	Wk 11	Wk 12	Wk 13	C	Bowls	Totals
ABC		3	1	1										2		1	8
ESPN		3	2	2	2	3	2	2	2	2	1	2	1	3		7	34
ESPN2			1	1	1						1	1	1			1	7
ESPNU			1	1	1						1		1				5
CBS				1	1	1	1	2	1	1	2	1	1	2	1		15
CBS Sports Network				1													1
SEC Network	1	4	3	3	3	3	3	2	2	2	3	3	3	2			37
ACC Network			1														1
ESPN+ (streaming)		4	5	1	1								3				14

Platform	Games
Broadcast	23
Cable	85
Streaming	14

*Unconfirmed total selections for the week.

== Awards and honors ==
=== Players of the week ===
Week	Offensive Player of the Week	Defensive Player of the Week	Special Teams Player of the Week	Offensive Line Player of the Week	Defensive Line Player of the Week	Freshman Player of the Week
Week 1 (Sept 5)	Jalen Milroe (RS So., QB, Alabama); Joe Milton (RS Sr., Tennessee)	Trevin Wallace (Jr., LB, Kentucky)	Barion Brown (So., KR/WR, Kentucky); Jordan Watkins (Sr., PR/WR, Ole Miss)	Gunner Britton (Sr., OL, Auburn)	Tyler Baron (Sr., DE, Tennessee)	Caleb Downs (Fr., DB, Alabama); Kyle Ferrie (Fr., K, Mississippi State)
Week 2 (Sept 11)	Spencer Rattler (RS SO, QB, South Carolina)	Jett Johnson (Gr., LB, Mississippi State) Eugene Asante (Jr., LB, Auburn)	Caden Davis (Sr., PK, Ole Miss)	Eli Cox (Sr. OL, Kentucky)	Nyles Gaddy (Sr., DL, Missouri) Trajan Jeffcoat (RS Sr., DL, Arkansas)	London Humphreys (Fr., WR, Vanderbilt)
Week 3 (Sept 16)	Jayden Daniels (Sr., QB, LSU) Malik Nabers (Jr., WR, LSU)	Trey Washington (Jr., S, Ole Miss)	Harrison Mevis (Sr., PK, Missouri)	Sedrick Van Pran-Granger (Jr. C, Georgia)	Cam Jackson (Jr., DE, Florida) T. J. Sanders (RS So, DT, South Carolina)	Jordan Castell (Fr, S, Florida)
Week 4 (Sept 23)	Jayden Daniels (2) (Sr., QB, LSU) Spencer Rattler (2) (RS SO, QB, South Carolina)	Maxwell Hairston (So., DB, Kentucky)	Trey Smack (So., PK, Florida)	Tyler Booker (So, G, Alabama)	Alex Huntley (RS Jr, DR, South Carolina)	Taurean York (Fr., LB, Texas A&M)
Week 5 (Oct 2)	Jaxson Dart (Jr., QB, Ole Miss) Ray Davis (Sr., RB, Kentucky)	Smael Mondon Jr. (Jr., ILB, Georgia)	Ainias Smith (Gr, WR/PR/KR, Texas A&M)	Jeremy Flax (Sr. OL, Kentucky)	James Pearce Jr. (So., DE, Tennessee)	Caleb Downs (2) (Fr., S, Alabama) Peyton Woodring (Fr., PK, Georgia)
Week 6 (Oct 9)	Carson Beck (Jr., QB, Georgia) Jayden Daniels (3) (Sr., QB, LSU)	Ashanti Cistrunk (Sr., LB, Ole Miss)	Will Reichard (Gr, PK/P, Alabama)	Emery Jones (So. OL, LSU)	Justin Eboigbe (RS Sr., DL, Alabama)	Arlis Boardingham (RS Fr., S, Florida) Peyton Woodring (2) (Fr., PK, Georgia)
Week 7 (Oct 16)	Graham Mertz (RS Jr., QB, Florida)	Darius Robinson (Gr., DE, Missouri)	Trey Smack (2) (So., PK, Florida) Dee Williams (RS Sr., DB, Tennessee)	JC Latham (Jr., OL, Alabama)	James Pearce Jr. (2) (So., DE, Tennessee) Landon Jackson (Fr., DE, Arkansas)	Peyton Woodring (3) (Fr., PK, Georgia)
Week 8 (Oct 23)	Cody Schrader (Gr., RB, Missouri)	Jihaad Campbell (So., LB, Alabama) Nathaniel Watson (Gr., LB, Mississippi State)	Will Reichard (2) (Gr, PK/P, Alabama)	Javon Foster (Gr. OL, Missouri)	Cedric Johnson (Sr., DE, Ole Miss)	Suntarine Perkins (Fr., LB, Ole Miss) Trey Holly (Fr., RB, LSU)
Week 9 (Oct 30)	Ladd McConkey (Jr., WR, Georgia)	Edgerrin Cooper (Jr., LB, Texas A&M) Trey Washington (2) (Jr., S, Ole Miss)	Charles Campbell (Sr., PK/P, Tennessee)	Gunner Britton (2) (Sr., OT, Auburn) John Campbell Jr. (Sr., OT, Tennessee)	Cedric Johnson (2) (Sr., DE, Ole Miss)	Connor Lew (Fr., OL, Auburn)
Week 10 (Nov 6)	Jalen Milroe (2) (RS So., QB, Alabama) Tre Harris (Sr., Ole Miss)	John Saunders Jr. (Sr., S, Ole Miss) Lorando Johnson (RS Jr., DB, Arkansas)	Peyton Woodring (Fr., PK/P, Georgia) Cam Little (Jr., PK/P, Arkansas)	Beaux Limmer (RS Sr. OL, Arkansas)	Nazir Stackhouse (Sr., DL, Georgia) Zxavian Harris (So., DT, Ole Miss)	Ty Bryant (Fr., DB, Kentucky) Jaylon Braxton (Fr., DB, Arkansas)
Week 11 (Nov 13)	Jayden Daniels (4) (Sr., QB, LSU)	Jalen McLeod (Jr., LB, Auburn)	Keionte Scott (Jr., PR, Auburn)	Charles Turner (Gr., OL, LSU)	Darius Robinson (Gr., DL, Missouri)	CJ Allen (Fr., LB, Georgia)
Week 12 (Nov 20)	Jayden Daniels (5) (Sr., QB, LSU) Brady Cook (Jr., QB, Missouri)	Nathaniel Watson (2) (Gr., LB, Mississippi State) Alfahiym Walcott (Sr., LB, Arkansas)	Harrison Mevis (2) (Sr., PK, Missouri)	Xavier Delgado (Gr., OL, Missouri)	Jordan Strachan (Gr., DL, South Carolina)	Kyle Ferrie (2) (Fr., PK, Mississippi State) Isaiah Augustave (Fr., RB, Arkansas)
Week 13 (Nov 27)	Jalen Milroe (3) (RS So., QB, Alabama) Cody Schrader (2) (Gr., RB, Missouri)	J. J. Weaver (Sr., LB, Kentucky) Tristan Newson (Jr., LB, Missouri)	Barion Brown (2) (So., KR/WR, Kentucky) Fraser Masin (Sr., P, Ole Miss)	Dayne Davis (RS Sr., OL, Tennessee)	Jay Jernigan (Sr., DL, Missouri)	CJ Allen (2) (Fr., LB, Georgia) Kadyn Proctor (Fr., OL, Alabama)

==== Totals per school ====
School	Total
Georgia	12
Missouri	12
Ole Miss	12
Alabama	11
Arkansas	8
Kentucky	8
LSU	8
Tennessee	8
Mississippi State	5
Auburn	4
Florida	4
South Carolina	4
Texas A&M	3
Vanderbilt	1

=== SEC individual awards ===
==== Players of the Year ====
On December 6, 2023, the Southeastern Conference released their Players of the Year and All-Conference Honors at the end of the season.

Award	Player/Coaches	School
Offensive Player of the Year	Jayden Daniels, QB, Sr.	LSU
Defensive Player of the Year	Dallas Turner, LB, Jr.	Alabama
Freshman of the Year	Caleb Downs, DB, Fr.	Alabama
Special Teams of the Year	Will Reichard, PK, GS.	Alabama
Jacobs Blocking Trophy	Sedrick Van Pran-Granger, OL, RS So.	Georgia
Scholar Athlete of the Year	Brady Cook, QB, RS Jr.	Missouri
Coach of the Year	Eliah Drinkwitz, HC	Missouri

==== All-SEC teams ====
The following players earned All-SEC honors. Any teams showing (_) following their name are indicating the number of All-SEC honors awarded to that university for first- and second-team respectively.

Honors	Player	School	Position	Year
First Team Offense	Jayden Daniels	LSU	QB	Sr.
First Team Offense	Cody Schrader	Missouri	RB	GS
First Team Offense	Quinshon Judkins	Ole Miss	RB	So.
First Team Offense	Brock Bowers	Georgia	TE	Jr.
First Team Offense	Malik Nabers	LSU	WR	Jr.
First Team Offense	Luther Burden III	Missouri	WR	So.
First Team Offense	JC Latham	Alabama	OL	Jr.
First Team Offense	Tate Ratledge	Georgia	OL	Jr.
First Team Offense	Sedrick Van Pran-Granger	Georgia	OL	RS Jr.
First Team Offense	Javon Foster	Missouri	OL	Sr.
First Team Offense	Will Campbell	LSU	OL	Sr.
First Team Offense	Ainias Smith	Texas A&M	AP/ST	GS
First Team Defense	Justin Eboigbe	Alabama	DL	GS
First Team Defense	Landon Jackson	Arkansas	DL	Jr.
First Team Defense	Darius Robinson	Missouri	DL	Sr.
First Team Defense	James Pearce Jr.	Tennessee	DL	So.
First Team Defense	Dallas Turner	Alabama	LB	Jr.
First Team Defense	Nathaniel Watson	Mississippi State	LB	GS
First Team Defense	Edgerrin Cooper	Texas A&M	LB	Jr.
First Team Defense	Caleb Downs	Alabama	DB	Fr.
First Team Defense	Kool-Aid McKinstry	Alabama	DB	Jr.
First Team Defense	Terrion Arnold	Alabama	DB	So.
First Team Defense	Malaki Starks	Georgia	DB	So.
First Team Defense	Kris Abrams-Draine	Missouri	DB	Jr.
First Team Special Teams	Will Reichard	Alabama	PK	GS
First Team Special Teams	Matthew Hayball	Vanderbilt	P	GS
First Team Special Teams	Kneeland Hibbett	Alabama	LS	Jr.
First Team Special Teams	Hunter Rogers	South Carolina	LS	RS Jr.
First Team Special Teams	Ainias Smith	Texas A&M	RS	GS
First Team Special Teams	Cam Little	Arkansas	KOS	Jr.

Honors	Player	School	Position	Year
Second Team Offense	Carson Beck	Georgia	QB	Jr.
Second Team Offense	Ray Davis	Kentucky	RB	Sr.
Second Team Offense	Jarquez Hunter	Auburn	RB	Jr.
Second Team Offense	Rivaldo Fairweather	Auburn	TE	Jr.
Second Team Offense	Caden Prieskorn	Georgia	TE	Sr.
Second Team Offense	Trey Knox	South Carolina	TE	GS
Second Team Offense	Brian Thomas Jr.	LSU	WR	Jr.
Second Team Offense	Xavier Legette	South Carolina	WR	Sr.
Second Team Offense	Tyler Booker	Alabama	OL	GS
Second Team Offense	Xavier Truss	Georgia	OL	Sr.
Second Team Offense	Eli Cox	Kentucky	OL	Sr.
Second Team Offense	Emery Jones	LSU	OL	So.
Second Team Offense	Layden Robinson	Texas A&M	OL	Sr.
Second Team Offense	Barion Brown	Kentucky	AP/ST	So.
Second Team Defense	Princely Umanmielen	Florida	DL	Jr.
Second Team Defense	Mykel Williams	Georgia	DL	So.
Second Team Defense	Nazir Stackhouse	Georgia	DL	Sr.
Second Team Defense	Shemar Turner	Texas A&M	DL	Jr.
Second Team Defense	Smael Mondon Jr.	Georgia	LB	Jr.
Second Team Defense	Harold Perkins	LSU	LB	So.
Second Team Defense	Ty'Ron Hopper	Missouri	LB	Jr.
Second Team Defense	Jaylin Simpson	Auburn	DB	Sr.
Second Team Defense	Kamari Lassiter	Georgia	DB	Jr.
Second Team Defense	Tykee Smith	Georgia	DB	Sr.
Second Team Defense	Maxwell Hairston	Kentucky	DB	So.
Second Team Special Teams	Harrison Mevis	Missouri	PK	Sr.
Second Team Special Teams	James Burnip	Alabama	P	RS Jr.
Second Team Special Teams	Max Fletcher	Arkansas	P	So.
Second Team Special Teams	Wesley Schelling	Vanderbilt	LS	Sr.
Second Team Special Teams	Barion Brown	Kentucky	RS	So.
Second Team Special Teams	Will Reichard	Alabama	KOS	GS

Notes:

- RS = Return Specialist
- AP/ST = All-Purpose/Special Teams Player (not a kicker or returner)
- † Two-time first team selection;
- ‡ Three-time first team selection

=== All-Americans ===
Currently, the NCAA compiles consensus all-America teams in the sports of Division I-FBS football and Division I men's basketball using a point system computed from All-America teams named by coaches associations or media sources. The system consists of three points for a first-team honor, two points for second-team honor, and one point for third-team honor. Honorable mention and fourth team or lower recognitions are not accorded any points. College Football All-American consensus teams are compiled by position and the player accumulating the most points at each position is named first team consensus all-American. Currently, the NCAA recognizes All-Americans selected by the AP, AFCA, FWAA, TSN, and the WCFF to determine Consensus and Unanimous All-Americans. Any player named to the First Team by all five of the NCAA-recognized selectors is deemed a Unanimous All-American.

Position	Player	School	Selector	Unanimous	Consensus
**First Team All-Americans**
QB	Jayden Daniels	LSU	(**AP**, **AFCA**, **FWAA**, **TSN**, Athlon Sports, ESPN, CBS, PFF, The Athletic, USAT, SI, FOX, Phil Steele)		✓
RB	Cody Schrader	Missouri	(**AP**, **TSN**, Athlon Sports, ESPN, CBS, USAT, SI, FOX, Phil Steele)		✓
TE	Brock Bowers	Georgia	(**AP**, **AFCA**, **FWAA**, **TSN**, **WCFF**, Athlon Sports, ESPN, CBS, The Athletic, PFF, USAT, SI, FOX, Phil Steele)	✓	✓
WR	Malik Nabers	LSU	(**AP**, **AFCA**, **FWAA**, **TSN**, **WCFF**, CFN, ESPN, CBS, Athlon Sports, The Athletic, USAT, SI, PFF, FOX, Phil Steele)	✓	✓
OL	Sedrick Van Pran-Granger	Georgia	(ESPN, SI)		
DB	Malaki Starks	Georgia	(**AP**, **AFCA**, **FWAA**, **WCFF**, Athlon Sports, ESPN, CBS, USAT, SI, Phil Steele)		✓
DB	Tykee Smith	Georgia	(CFN)		
CB	Kool-Aid McKinstry	Alabama	(**AP**, **TSN**, Athlon Sports, CBS, PFF, USAT, SI)		✓
CB	Terrion Arnold	Alabama	(**AP**, CFN, ESPN)		
LB	Dallas Turner	Alabama	(**AP**, **AFCA**, **FWAA**, **TSN**, Athlon Sports, ESPN, CBS, The Athletic, USAT, Phil Steele)		✓
LB	Edgerrin Cooper	Texas A&M	(**AP**, **AFCA**, **WCFF**, Athlon Sports, ESPN, CFN, CBS, The Athletic, PFF, FOX, Phil Steele)		✓
LB	Kris Abrams-Draine	Missouri	(Athlon Sports)		
P	James Burnip	Alabama	(**PFF**)		
KR	Barion Brown	Kentucky	(**TSN**)		
LS	James Rosenberry Jr.	LSU	(**AFCA**)		

Position	Player	School	Selector	Unanimous	Consensus
**Second Team All-Americans**
QB	Jayden Daniels	LSU	(WCFF, CFN)		
RB	Cody Schrader	Missouri	(AFCA, The Athletic, CFN, WCFF)		
WR	Luther Burden III	Missouri	(AP, CBS/247 Sports, Athlon Sports, PFF, The Athletic, CFN, Phil Steele, TSN)		
WR	Brian Thomas Jr.	LSU	(Athlon Sports)		
TE	Brock Bowers	Georgia	(CFN)		
DB	Tykee Smith	Georgia	(CBS/247 Sports)		
DB	Malaki Starks	Georgia	(FOX, Athlon Sports, The Athletic, PFF, TSN)		
DL	James Pearce Jr.	Tennessee	(Athlon Sports)		
CB	Jaylin Simpson	Auburn	(FOX)		
CB	Caleb Downs	Alabama	(TSN, Athlon Sports, PFF, USAT)		
CB	Terrion Arnold	Alabama	(AFCA, Athlon Sports, CBS/247 Sports, PFF, TSN)		
CB	Kool-Aid McKinstry	Alabama	(ESPN, The Athletic, WCFF)		
LB	Dallas Turner	Alabama	(FOX, WCFF)		
LB	Chris Braswell	Alabama	(CFN)		
LB	Nathaniel Watson	Mississippi State	(CFN, ESPN)		
LB	Edgerrin Cooper	Texas A&M	(FWAA, TSN)		
LB	Kris Abrams-Draine	Missouri	(FOX, PFF, Phil Steele, WCFF)		
OL	Javon Foster	Missouri	(CBS/247 Sports, Athlon Sports, PFF, FWAA, CFN)		
OL	JC Latham	Alabama	(CBS/247 Sports, Athlon Sports, FWAA, USAT, PFF, WCFF, Phil Steele, TSN)		
OL	Sedrick Van Pran-Granger	Georgia	(AFCA, CBS/247 Sports, FWAA, PFF, Athlon Sports, The Athletic, Phil Steele, WCFF, TSN)		
OL	Tate Ratledge	Georgia	(Athlon Sports, Phil Steele, PFF)		
KR	Barion Brown	Kentucky	(CBS/247 Sports)		
PK	Will Reichard	Alabama	(CBS/247 Sports, TSN)		
P	Matthew Hayball	Vanderbilt	(The Athletic, Athlon Sports, FWAA, WCFF, Phil Steele)		

Position	Player	School	Selector
**Third Team All-Americans**
WR	Xavier Legette	South Carolina	(Phil Steele)
WR	Brian Thomas Jr.	LSU	(**AP**)
OL	Will Campbell	LSU	(**Athlon Sports**)
OL	Darius Robinson	Missouri	(Athlon Sports)
OL	Javon Foster	Missouri	(Phil Steele)
CB	Kool-Aid McKinstry	Alabama	(CFN, Phil Steele)
DB	Deone Walker	Kentucky	(CFN)
LB	Nathaniel Watson	Mississippi State	(**AP**, Athlon Sports, Phil Steele)
LB	Kris Abrams-Draine	Missouri	(CFN)
S	Javon Bullard	Georgia	(Athlon Sports)
PK	Harrison Mevis	Missouri	(Phil Steele)
PK	Will Reichard	Alabama	(**AP**, Athlon Sports)
PR	Ainias Smith	Texas A&M	(Phil Steele)
KR	Barion Brown	Kentucky	(CFN)
P	James Burnip	Alabama	(Athlon Sports)

Position	Player	School	Selector
**Fourth Team All-Americans**
QB	Jalen Milroe	Alabama	(Phil Steele)
WR	Brian Thomas Jr.	LSU	(Phil Steele)
OL	Will Campbell	LSU	(Phil Steele)
CB	Terrion Arnold	Alabama	(Phil Steele)
DB	Deone Walker	Kentucky	(Phil Steele)
PR	Dee Williams	Tennessee	(Phil Steele)
PK	Will Reichard	Alabama	(Phil Steele)

==== List of All American Teams ====
- American Football Coaches Association All-America Team
- Associated Press All-America Team
- CBS Sports All-America Team
- The Athletic All-America Team
- FOX All-America Team
- Sports Illustrated All-America Team
- USA Today All-America Team
- Walter Camp All-America Team
- Writers Association of America All-America Team
- The Sporting News College Football All-America Team
- ESPN All-America Team
- PFF College All-America Team
- Athlon Sports College Football's Postseason All-America Team
- Phil Steele's Postseason All-American Team
- All-American College Football Team and Individual Honors

=== All-SEC freshman ===
Offense

Player	Position	School
Chris Parson	QB	Mississippi State
Rueben Owens	RB	Texas A&M
Sedrick Alexander	RB	Vanderbilt
Eugene Wilson III	WR	Florida
London Humphreys	WR	Vanderbilt
Brett Norfleet	TE	Missouri
Kadyn Proctor	OL	Alabama
Andrew Chamblee	OL	Arkansas
Connor Lew	OL	Auburn
Earnest Greene	OL	Georgia
Lance Heard	OL	LSU
Trovon Baugh	OL	South Carolina
Chase Bisontis	OL	Texas A&M

Defense

Player	Position	School
Keldric Faulk	DL	Auburn
TJ Searcy	DL	Florida
Kelby Collins	DL	Florida
Donterry Russell	DL	Mississippi State
Raylen Wilson	LB	Georgia
Suntarine Perkins	LB	Ole Miss
Taurean York	LB	Texas A&M
Caleb Downs	DB	Alabama
Jaylon Braxton	DB	Arkansas
Jordan Castell	DB	Florida
Jalon Kilgore	DB	South Carolina

Special Teams

Player	Position	School
Alex McPherson	PK	Auburn
Jackson Ross	P	Tennessee
Isaiah Sategna III	RS	Arkansas
Alex McPherson	KOS	Auburn
Walker Himebauch	LS	Kentucky

=== National award winners ===
2023 College Football Award Winners

Award	Player	Class	Position	School
Heisman Trophy	**Jayden Daniels**	Sr.	QB	LSU
AP Player of the Year	**Jayden Daniels**	Sr.	QB	LSU
Walter Camp Award	**Jayden Daniels**	Sr.	QB	LSU
Davey O'Brien Award	**Jayden Daniels**	Sr.	QB	LSU
Johnny Unitas Golden Arm Award	**Jayden Daniels**	Sr.	QB	LSU
Burlsworth Trophy	Cody Schrader	GS	RB	Missouri
John Mackey Award	Brock Bowers	Jr.	TE	Georgia
Wuerffel Trophy	Ladd McConkey	RS Jr.	WR	Georgia

== Home game attendance ==
Team	Stadium	Capacity	Game 1	Game 2	Game 3	Game 4	Game 5	Game 6	Game 7	Game 8	Total	Average	% of Capacity
Alabama	Bryant–Denny Stadium	100,077	100,027	100,077	100,077	100,077	100,077	100,077	100,077		700,489	100,070	99.99%
Arkansas	Donald W. Reynolds Razorback Stadium	76,212	44,397 (Note: Game played at Arkansas' secondary home stadium War Memorial Stadium, capacity: 54,120.)	73,173	74,821	71,505	72,033	61,442	59,847		457,218	68,804	(90.27%)
Auburn	Jordan–Hare Stadium	87,451	88,043	88,043	88,043	63,523	88,043	88,043	88,043		591,781	84,540	96.67%
Florida	Ben Hill Griffin Stadium	88,548	88,163	90,751	89,053	89,432	89,782	90,341			537,522	89,587	101.17%
Georgia	Sanford Stadium	92,746	92,746	92,746	92,746	92,746	92,746	92,746	92,746		649,222	92,746	100%
Kentucky	Kroger Field	61,000	58,286	61,876	59,456	61,699	61,654	61,665	61,936		426,572	60,939	99.9%
LSU	Tiger Stadium	102,321	97,735	99,648	102,321	101,776	102,321	100,212	101,178		705,191	100,742	98.46%
Mississippi State	Davis Wade Stadium	60,311	50,041	51,648	60,084	60,111	47,158	52,329	53,855	60,412	435,638	54,455	90.29%
Missouri	Faurot Field	62,621	50,434	57,645	62,621	62,621	62,621	62,621	62,621		421,184	60,169	96.08%
Ole Miss	Vaught–Hemingway Stadium	64,038	60,097	64,150	66,703	65,748	62,914	65,680	60,752		446,044	63,721	99.5%
South Carolina	Williams–Brice Stadium	77,559	78,281	78,311	79,247	75,348	75,682	77,788	80,172		544,829	77,833	100.35%
Tennessee	Neyland Stadium	101,915	101,915	101,915	101,915	101,915	101,915	101,915	101,915		713,405	101,915	100%
Texas A&M	Kyle Field	102,733	97,560	93,090	102,530	108,101	95,297	103,266	94,794		694,638	99,234	96.59%
Vanderbilt	FirstBank Stadium	28,500 (Note: Temporary capacity for 2023 during stadium renovations.)	21,407	22,035	26,279	26,332	28,500	28,500			153,053	25,509	89.5%

== NFL draft ==
The following players were selected in the 2024 NFL draft:

=== List of selections ===
Player	Position	School	Draft Round	Overall Pick	Team
Jayden Daniels	QB	LSU	1	2	Washington Commanders
Malik Nabers	WR	LSU	1	6	New York Giants
JC Latham	OT	Alabama	1	7	Tennessee Titans
Brock Bowers	TE	Georgia	1	13	Las Vegas Raiders
Dallas Turner	LB	Alabama	1	17	Minnesota Vikings
Amarius Mims	OT	Georgia	1	18	Cincinnati Bengals
Brian Thomas Jr.	WR	LSU	1	23	Jacksonville Jaguars
Terrion Arnold	CB	Alabama	1	24	Detroit Lions
Darius Robinson	DL	Missouri	1	27	Arizona Cardinals
Ricky Pearsall	WR	Florida	1	31	San Francisco 49ers
Xavier Legette	WR	South Carolina	1	32	Carolina Panthers
Ladd McConkey	WR	Georgia	2	34	Los Angeles Chargers
Kool-Aid McKinstry	CB	Alabama	2	41	New Orleans Saints
Kamari Lassiter	CB	Georgia	2	42	Houston Texans
Edgerrin Cooper	LB	Texas A&M	2	45	Green Bay Packers
Maason Smith	DT	LSU	2	48	Jacksonville Jaguars
Chris Braswell	LB	Alabama	2	57	Tampa Bay Buccaneers
Javon Bullard	S	Georgia	2	58	Green Bay Packers
Ennis Rakestraw	CB	Missouri	2	61	Detroit Lions
Andru Phillips	CB	Kentucky	3	70	New York Giants
Trevin Wallace	LB	Kentucky	3	72	Carolina Panthers
Jermaine Burton	WR	Alabama	3	80	Cincinnati Bengals
Tykee Smith	S	Georgia	3	89	Tampa Bay Buccaneers
Ty'Ron Hopper	LB	Missouri	3	91	Green Bay Packers
McKinnley Jackson	DT	Texas A&M	3	97	Cincinnati Bengals
Layden Robinson	OG	Texas A&M	4	103	New England Patriots
Justin Eboigbe	DT	Alabama	4	105	Los Angeles Chargers
Decamerion Richardson	CB	Mississippi State	4	112	Las Vegas Raiders
Javon Foster	OT	Missouri	4	114	Jacksonville Jaguars
Jordan Jefferson	DT	LSU	4	116	Jacksonville Jaguars
Jaylen Wright	RB	Tennessee	4	120	Miami Dolphins
Ray Davis	RB	Kentucky	4	128	Buffalo Bills
Nehemiah Pritchett	CB	Auburn	5	136	Seattle Seahawks
Sedrick Van Pran-Granger	C	Georgia	5	141	Buffalo Bills
Kris Abrams-Draine	CB	Missouri	5	145	Denver Broncos
Spencer Rattler	QB	South Carolina	5	150	New Orleans Saints
Jaylon Carlies	S	Missouri	5	151	Indianapolis Colts
Ainias Smith	WR	Texas A&M	5	152	Philadelphia Eagles
Deantre Prince	CB	Ole Miss	5	153	Jacksonville Jaguars
Jaylin Simpson	S	Auburn	5	164	Indianapolis Colts
Marcellas Dial	CB	South Carolina	6	180	New England Patriots
Jase McClellan	RB	Alabama	6	186	Atlanta Falcons
Mekhi Wingo	DT	LSU	6	189	Detroit Lions
D. J. James	CB	Auburn	6	192	Seattle Seahawks
Joe Milton	QB	Tennessee	6	193	New England Patriots
Zion Logue	DT	Georgia	6	197	Atlanta Falcons
Jaden Crumedy	DT	Mississippi State	6	200	Carolina Panthers
Will Reichard	K	Alabama	6	203	Minnesota Vikings
Nathaniel Watson	LB	Mississippi State	6	206	Cleveland Browns
Kamal Hadden	CB	Tennessee	6	211	Kansas City Chiefs
Cam Little	K	Arkansas	6	212	Jacksonville Jaguars
Cedric Johnson	DE	Ole Miss	6	214	Cincinnati Bengals
Beaux Limmer	C	Arkansas	6	217	Los Angeles Rams
Devin Leary	QB	Kentucky	6	218	Baltimore Ravens
Daijahn Anthony	S	Ole Miss	7	224	Cincinnati Bengals
Justin Rogers	DT	Auburn	7	244	Dallas Cowboys
Marcus Harris	DT	Auburn	7	247	Houston Texans
Nick Gargiulo	C	South Carolina	7	256	Denver Broncos
Jaylen Key	S	Alabama	7	257	New York Jets

=== Total picks by school ===
Team	Round 1	Round 2	Round 3	Round 4	Round 5	Round 6	Round 7	Total
Alabama	3	2	1	1	–	2	1	10
Arkansas	–	–	–	–	–	2	–	2
Auburn	–	–	–	–	2	1	2	5
Florida	1	–	–	–	–	–	–	1
Georgia	2	3	1	–	1	1	–	8
Kentucky	–	–	2	1	–	1	–	4
LSU	3	1	–	1	–	1	–	6
Mississippi State	–	–	–	1	–	2	–	3
Missouri	1	1	1	1	2	–	–	6
Ole Miss	–	–	–	–	1	1	1	3
South Carolina	1	–	–	–	1	1	1	4
Tennessee	–	–	–	1	–	2	–	3
Texas A&M	–	1	1	1	1	–	–	4
Vanderbilt	–	–	–	–	–	–	–	0
Total	11	8	6	7	8	14	5	59
