= Jordan Castell =

American football player (born 2004)

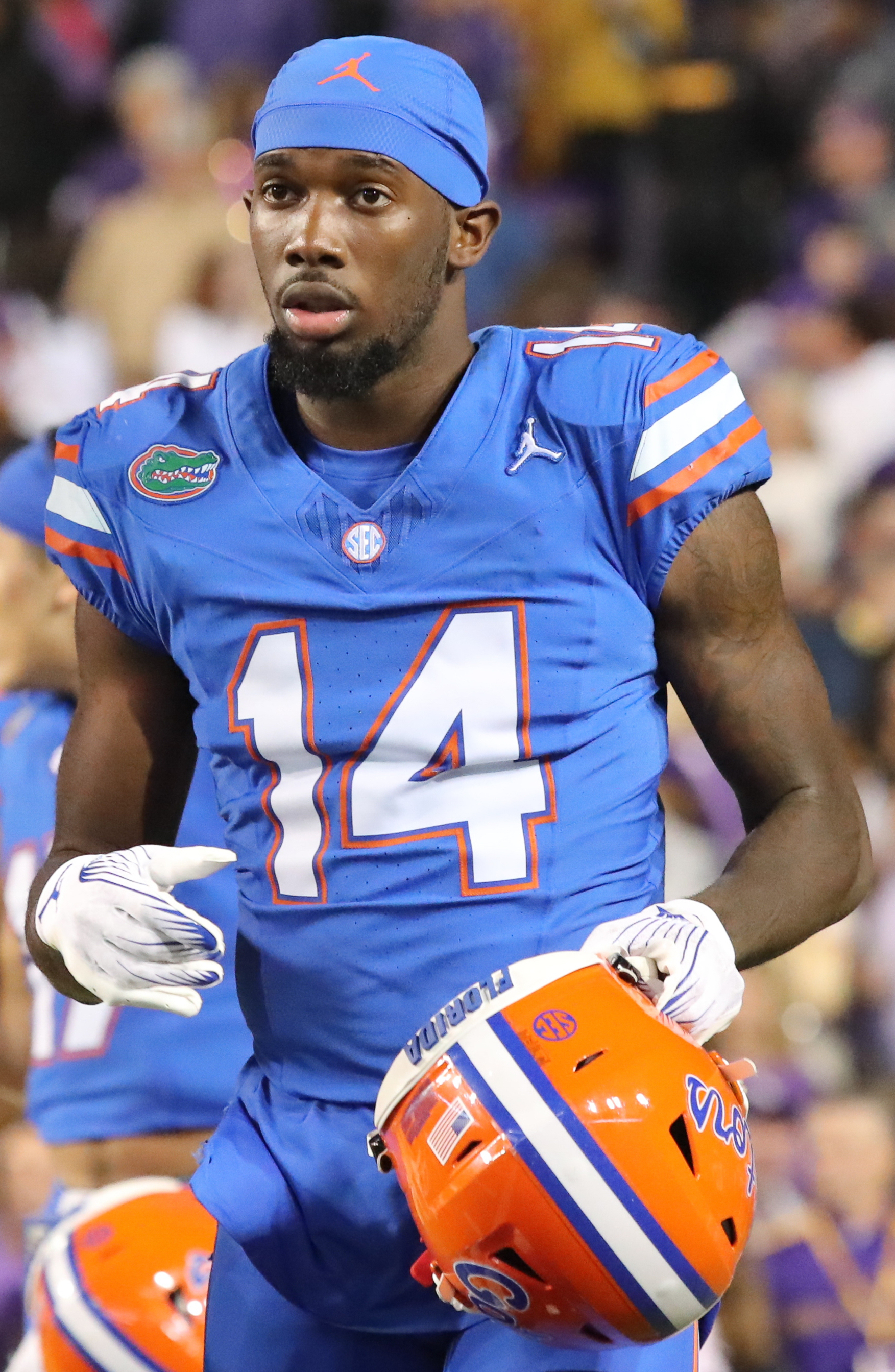
- Castell in 2023

No. 5 – Kentucky Wildcats
- Position: Safety
- Class: Senior

Personal information
- Born: March 7, 2004 (age 22); Orlando, Florida, U.S.
- Listed height: 6 ft 2 in (1.88 m)
- Listed weight: 211 lb (96 kg)

Career information
- High school: West Orange (Winter Garden, Florida)
- College: Florida (2023–2025); Kentucky (2026–present)

Awards and highlights
- First-team All-SEC Freshman (2023)
- Stats at ESPN

Jordan Castell (born March 7, 2004) is an American college football safety for the Kentucky Wildcats. He previously played for the Florida Gators.

== Early life ==
Castell was born on March 7, 2004 in Orlando, Florida and attended West Orange High School in Winter Garden, Florida. As a senior, he tallied two interceptions, two fumble recoveries, and three defensive touchdowns. Coming out of high school, Castell was rated as a four-star recruit, the number 13 safety in the country, and as the 202nd best player in the class, where he held 34 scholarship offers. Castell committed to play college football for the Florida Gators.

== College career ==
In week 3 of the 2023 season, Castell notched ten tackles and a pass deflection as he helped the Gators upset #10 Tennessee, earning Southeastern Conference (SEC) freshman of the week and the Shaun Alexander freshman of the week honors. In week 10, Castell recorded his first career interception against Arkansas.
