= Dwight McGlothern =

American football player (born 2002)

Rhode Island Breakers
- Position: Cornerback
- Roster status: Unsigned draft pick

Personal information
- Born: February 6, 2002 (age 24); Houston, Texas, U.S.
- Listed height: 6 ft 2 in (1.88 m)
- Listed weight: 185 lb (84 kg)

Career information
- High school: Klein Oak (Spring, Texas)
- College: LSU (2020–2021); Arkansas (2022–2023)
- NFL draft: 2024: undrafted

Career history
- Minnesota Vikings (2024–2025); Rhode Island Breakers (2027-present)

Awards and highlights
- Second-team All-SEC (2022)
- Stats at Pro Football Reference

Dwight McGlothern Jr. (born February 6, 2002) is an American professional football cornerback. He played college football for the LSU Tigers and Arkansas Razorbacks.

== Early life ==
McGlothern attended Klein Oak High School in Klein, Texas. He played wide receiver and cornerback in high school. During his career, he had 2,593 receiving yards with 34 touchdowns on offense and 15 interceptions on defense. McGlothern played in the 2020 All-American Bowl. A four star prospect, committed to Louisiana State University (LSU) to play college football.

== College career ==
As a true freshman at LSU in 2020, McGlothern played in seven games and had nine tackles. As a junior in 2021, he started six of 10 games, recording 32 tackles and one interception returned for a touchdown. McGlothern transferred to the University of Arkansas in 2022 and was a starter his first year. He finished the year with 52 tackles and four interceptions.

== Professional career ==
Pre-draft measurables
| Height | Weight | Arm length | Hand span | Wingspan | 40-yard dash | 10-yard split | 20-yard split | 20-yard shuttle | Three-cone drill | Vertical jump | Broad jump |
|---|---|---|---|---|---|---|---|---|---|---|---|
| 6 ft 1 5/8 in (1.87 m) | 185 lb (84 kg) | 30 1/2 in (0.77 m) | 8 5/8 in (0.22 m) | 6 ft 2 7/8 in (1.90 m) | 4.47 s | 1.50 s | 2.60 s | 4.43 s | 7.23 s | 32.0 in (0.81 m) | 9 ft 7 in (2.92 m) |
All values from NFL Combine/Pro Day

McGlothern signed with the Minnesota Vikings as an undrafted free agent on April 27, 2024. He was also selected by the Michigan Panthers in the second round of the 2024 UFL draft on July 17. McGlothern, a UDFA, was among the 53 players to make the Vikings initial Week 1 roster. As a rookie, he appeared in five games.

In the 2025 season, McGlothern appeared in eight games. On November 20, 2025, McGlothern was waived by the Vikings; he was re-signed to the practice squad two days later. He was promoted back to the active roster on December 20.

On August 25, 2026, McGlothern was waived with an injury designation by the Vikings.
