= Eli Cox =

American football player (born 2000)

No. 66 – Jacksonville Jaguars
- Position: Center
- Roster status: Practice squad

Personal information
- Born: October 19, 2000 (age 26); Nicholasville, Kentucky, U.S.
- Listed height: 6 ft 4 in (1.93 m)
- Listed weight: 309 lb (140 kg)

Career information
- High school: West Jessamine (Nicholasville)
- College: Kentucky (2019–2024)
- NFL draft: 2025: undrafted

Career history
- Houston Texans (2025)*; Jacksonville Jaguars (2026–present)*
- * Offseason or practice squad member only

Awards and highlights
- Second-team All-SEC (2023)
- Stats at Pro Football Reference

Eli Cox (born October 19, 2000) is an American professional football center for the Jacksonville Jaguars of the National Football League (NFL). He played college football for the Kentucky Wildcats.

== Early life ==
Cox was born in Nicholasville, Kentucky. He attended West Jessamine High School where he played football, helping his team compile a record of 6–5 in his senior year. He was invited to the Louisville vs. Bluegrass Senior All-Star game and was ranked the 14th-best Kentucky recruit in his class by 247Sports. A three-star prospect, he committed to play college football for the Kentucky Wildcats, the lone Power Five team to give him an offer.

== College career ==
Cox redshirted as a true freshman for Kentucky in 2019, then appeared in eight games as a backup guard in 2020. He won a starting role at right guard in 2021. He was a mid-season All-America selection but then suffered a season-ending hand injury in Kentucky's ninth game of the season. He was Kentucky's starting center in 2022 and then moved back to guard for the start of the 2023 season, before returning to center mid-season in 2023. He served as a team captain in the 2023 season, being named second-team All-Southeastern Conference (SEC). He returned in 2024 and started all 12 games at center, being named third-team All-SEC. He finished his collegiate career having started 47 games, 35 at center and 12 at right guard, while having played under four different offensive line coaches. He was invited to the NFL Scouting Combine after the 2024 season.

== Professional career ==
Pre-draft measurables
Height	Weight	Arm length	Hand span	Wingspan	40-yard dash	10-yard split	20-yard split	20-yard shuttle	Three-cone drill	Vertical jump	Broad jump
6 ft 4 1/4 in (1.94 m)	306 lb (139 kg)	31 in (0.79 m)	9 1/4 in (0.23 m)	6 ft 5 5/8 in (1.97 m)	5.02 s	1.75 s	2.90 s	4.58 s	7.63 s	32.5 in (0.83 m)	9 ft 1 in (2.77 m)
All values from NFL Combine

=== Houston Texans ===
Cox was signed by the Houston Texans as an undrafted free agent on May 9, 2025. He was waived on August 26 as part of final roster cuts, and re-signed to the practice squad. On January 20, 2026, Cox signed a reserve/futures contract with Houston.

On August 30, 2026, Cox was waived by the Texans as a part of final roster cuts.

=== Jacksonville Jaguars ===
On September 1, 2026, Cox was signed to the Jacksonville Jaguars' practice squad.

== Personal life ==
Cox is married.
