= Justin Rogers (defensive tackle) =

American football player (born 2001)

Profile
- Position: Defensive tackle

Personal information
- Born: September 12, 2001 (age 25); Detroit, Michigan, U.S.
- Listed height: 6 ft 2 in (1.88 m)
- Listed weight: 338 lb (153 kg)

Career information
- High school: Oak Park (Oak Park, Michigan)
- College: Kentucky (2020–2022); Auburn (2023)
- NFL draft: 2024: 7th round, 244th overall pick

Career history
- Dallas Cowboys (2024)*; Cincinnati Bengals (2024)*; Dallas Cowboys (2024); Seattle Seahawks (2025)*; Philadelphia Eagles (2025)*
- * Offseason or practice squad member only
- Stats at Pro Football Reference

Justin Rogers (born September 12, 2001) is an American professional football defensive tackle. He played college football for the Kentucky Wildcats and Auburn Tigers and was selected by the Cowboys in the seventh round of the 2024 NFL draft.

== Early life ==
In Rogers's freshman season, he was an immediate starter at right tackle. In his junior season, he was a starter at right tackle, and he notched 22 tackles for loss, seven sacks, and four forced fumbles as a linebacker. Coming out of high school, Rogers was rated as a four-star recruit. Rogers was also rated the top offensive guard and the top player in the state of Michigan. Rogers held scholarship offers from schools such as Kentucky, Michigan, Alabama, Georgia, Tennessee and LSU. Rogers ultimately committed to play college football for the Kentucky Wildcats.

== College career ==
=== Kentucky ===
During the 2020 season finale versus rival Alabama, Rogers notched a then career-high three tackles. In Rogers first two seasons in 2020 and 2021, he tallied 26 tackles with three and a half being for a loss, and two and a half sacks. During the 2022 season, Rogers notched 36 tackles with one and a half going for a loss, along with half a sack. After the conclusion of the 2022 season, Rogers decided to enter the NCAA transfer portal.

In Rogers career with Kentucky, he played in 33 games where he totaled 60 tackles, with five going for a loss, and three sacks.

=== Auburn ===
Rogers decided to transfer to play for the Auburn Tigers. During the 2023 season, Rogers had 17 tackles with two being for a loss, and a sack. After the conclusion of the 2023 season, Rogers declared for the 2024 NFL draft.

== Professional career ==
Pre-draft measurables
Height	Weight	Arm length	Hand span	Wingspan	40-yard dash	10-yard split	20-yard split	20-yard shuttle	Three-cone drill	Vertical jump	Broad jump	Bench press
6 ft 2 1/2 in (1.89 m)	330 lb (150 kg)	33 in (0.84 m)	10 1/8 in (0.26 m)	6 ft 7 in (2.01 m)	5.52 s	1.86 s	3.06 s	4.87 s	8.17 s	26.0 in (0.66 m)	8 ft 5 in (2.57 m)	21 reps
All values from NFL Combine/Pro Day

=== Dallas Cowboys (first stint) ===
Rogers was selected by the Dallas Cowboys in the seventh round (244th overall) of the 2024 NFL draft. He was released during roster cuts on August 26, 2024.

=== Cincinnati Bengals ===
On August 29, 2024, Rogers was signed to the Cincinnati Bengals practice squad.

=== Dallas Cowboys (second stint) ===
On December 19, 2024, the Dallas Cowboys signed Rogers to their active roster off of the Bengals' practice squad.

On June 18, 2025, Rogers was waived by the Cowboys.

=== Seattle Seahawks ===
On July 21, 2025, Rogers signed with the Seattle Seahawks. He was waived by the Seahawks on July 29.

=== Philadelphia Eagles ===
On August 12, 2025, Rogers signed with the Philadelphia Eagles. He was waived on August 26 as part of final roster cuts.
