= John Saunders Jr. =

American football player (born 2001)

No. 35 – Green Bay Packers
- Position: Safety
- Roster status: Practice squad

Personal information
- Born: October 24, 2001 (age 25); Pittsburgh, Pennsylvania , U.S.
- Listed height: 6 ft 2 in (1.88 m)
- Listed weight: 211 lb (96 kg)

Career information
- High school: High Point Christian
- College: Miami (OH) (2020–2022); Ole Miss (2023–2024)
- NFL draft: 2025: undrafted

Career history
- Miami Dolphins (2025)*; New England Patriots (2025); New York Jets (2026)*; Cleveland Browns (2026)*; Green Bay Packers (2026–present)*
- * Offseason or practice squad member only

Awards and highlights
- 2× Second-team All-SEC (2023, 2024)
- Stats at Pro Football Reference

John Saunders Jr. (born October 24, 2001) is an American professional football safety for the Green Bay Packers of the National Football League (NFL). Saunders played college football for the Miami RedHawks and Ole Miss Rebels. He signed with the Miami Dolphins as an undrafted free agent in 2025.

== Early life ==
Saunders Jr. was born in High Point, North Carolina and attended High Point Christian Academy. Coming out of high school he committed to play college football for the Miami RedHawks.

== College career ==
=== Miami (OH) ===
From 2020 to 2022, Saunders Jr. attended Miami University.

=== Ole Miss ===
In 2023, he transferred to Ole Miss.

He finished the 2024 season, totaling 47 tackles with one and a half being for a loss, five pass deflections, and three interceptions.

== Professional career ==
Pre-draft measurables
Height	Weight	Arm length	Hand span	Wingspan	40-yard dash	10-yard split	20-yard split	20-yard shuttle	Three-cone drill	Vertical jump	Broad jump	Bench press
6 ft 2 3/8 in (1.89 m)	211 lb (96 kg)	32 1/8 in (0.82 m)	9 3/8 in (0.24 m)	6 ft 5 1/2 in (1.97 m)	4.57 s	1.61 s	2.69 s	4.32 s	6.81 s	37.0 in (0.94 m)	10 ft 6 in (3.20 m)	14 reps
All values from Pro Day

=== Miami Dolphins ===
After not being selected in the 2025 NFL draft, Saunders signed with the Miami Dolphins as an undrafted free agent. He was released during the preseason with the Dolphins, but later signed to the team's practice squad after final roster cuts.

=== New England Patriots ===
On October 30, 2025, Saunders was signed off the Dolphins' practice squad to the New England Patriots' active roster. Saunders was released from the Patriots on November 17 and re-signed to the practice squad two days later.

On February 11, 2026, Saunders signed a reserve/futures contract with New England. He was waived on August 30.

=== New York Jets ===
On September 15, 2026, Saunders signed with the New York Jets practice squad. On October 1, he was released.

=== Cleveland Browns ===
On October 20, 2026, Saunders signed with the Cleveland Browns practice squad. On October 27, he was released.

=== Green Bay Packers ===
On November 3, 2026, Saunders signed with the Green Bay Packers practice squad.
