= Demani Richardson =

American football defensive back (born 2000)

Profile
- Position: Safety

Personal information
- Born: October 7, 2000 (age 26); Waxahachie, Texas, U.S.
- Listed height: 6 ft 1 in (1.85 m)
- Listed weight: 215 lb (98 kg)

Career information
- High school: Waxahachie
- College: Texas A&M (2019–2023)
- NFL draft: 2024: undrafted

Career history
- Carolina Panthers (2024–2025)

Career NFL statistics as of 2025
- Total tackles: 58
- Fumble recoveries: 1
- Pass deflections: 2
- Interceptions: 1
- Stats at Pro Football Reference

Demani Richardson (born October 7, 2000) is an American professional football safety. He played college football for the Texas A&M Aggies.

== Early life ==
Richardson grew up in Waxahachie, Texas and attended Waxahachie High School. In Richardson's high school career, he played on offense and defense. On offense, he rushed for 556 yards and seven touchdowns, while also hauling in 13 passes for 293 yards and four touchdowns. On defense, he tallied 72 tackles with seven being for a loss, one sack, three pass deflections, five interceptions, and two fumble recoveries. Richardson committed to play college football at Texas A&M.

== College career ==
In week six of the 2019 season, Richardson picked off quarterback Tua Tagovailoa in the red zone for his first career interceptions, and Tua's first in the 2019 season, but the Aggies lost 48–27 against Alabama. Richardson finished the 2019 campaign with 71 tackles with 0.5 going for a loss, and 0.5 sacks, two pass deflections, an interception, and a forced fumble. For his performance, Richardson was named to the SEC all-freshman team. Richardson started the 2020 season strong, as in week one he totalled seven tackles and an interception in Texas A&M's 17–12 win over Vanderbilt. Richardson finished the 2020 season with 36 tackles with 2.5 going for a loss, a pass deflection, and an interception. In week six of the 2021 season, Richardson picked off quarterback Bryce Young in the endzone, helping Texas A&M upset #1 Alabama 41–38. In week eleven, Richardson posted 13 tackles in a loss to Ole Miss. Richardson finished the 2021 season with 65 tackles with 6.5 going for a loss, 2.5 sacks, three pass deflections, an interception, and a forced fumble. For his performance, Richardson was named third-team all-SEC by Pro Football Focus.

Richardson got off to a good start in the 2022 season, as in week four he returned a fumble 82 yards for a touchdown, as he helped Texas A&M beat #10 Arkansas 23–21. In Texas A&M's season finale, Richardson returned a fumble for a touchdown to give Texas A&M the lead, as he would help the Aggies upset #5 LSU 38–23. For his performance, Richardson was named the SEC co-defensive player of the week. Richardson finished the 2022 season with 73 tackles with 2.5 being for a loss, five pass deflections, an interception, two fumble recoveries, a forced fumbles, and two touchdowns. Instead of opting for the 2023 NFL draft, Richardson decided to return to Texas A&M for his final year. Richardson was named preseason second-team all-SEC. He would also be named a third-team preseason All-American by Athlon Sports. Richardson was also named to the Jim Thorpe Award watch list, which is awarded to the nation's best defensive back.

== Professional career ==
Pre-draft measurables
Height	Weight	Arm length	Hand span	Wingspan	40-yard dash	10-yard split	20-yard split	20-yard shuttle	Three-cone drill	Vertical jump	Broad jump
6 ft 0 1/2 in (1.84 m)	210 lb (95 kg)	32 in (0.81 m)	9 7/8 in (0.25 m)	6 ft 5 1/8 in (1.96 m)	4.60 s	1.54 s	2.67 s	4.40 s	7.18 s	31.5 in (0.80 m)	9 ft 8 in (2.95 m)
All values from NFL Combine/Pro Day

Richardson signed with the Carolina Panthers as an undrafted free agent on May 10, 2024. He was waived on August 28, and re-signed to the practice squad. Richardson was promoted to the active roster on September 24.

On January 6, 2026, Richardson was waived by the Panthers and re-signed to the practice squad two days later. He signed a reserve/future contract with Carolina on January 12.

On August 30, 2026, Richardson was waived by the Panthers as a part of final roster cuts.
