= Darius Robinson =

American football player (born 2001)

No. 56 – Arizona Cardinals
- Position: Defensive tackle
- Roster status: Active

Personal information
- Born: September 13, 2001 (age 25); Southfield, Michigan, U.S.
- Listed height: 6 ft 5 in (1.96 m)
- Listed weight: 290 lb (132 kg)

Career information
- High school: Canton (Canton, Michigan)
- College: Missouri (2019–2023)
- NFL draft: 2024: 1st round, 27th overall pick

Career history
- Arizona Cardinals (2024–present)

Awards and highlights
- First-team All-SEC (2023)

Career NFL statistics as of Week 5, 2026
- Tackles: 67
- Sacks: 3
- Fumble recoveries: 1
- Stats at Pro Football Reference

Darius Robinson (born September 13, 2001) is an American professional football defensive tackle for the Arizona Cardinals of the National Football League (NFL). He played college football for the Missouri Tigers and was selected by the Cardinals in the first round of the 2024 NFL draft.

== Early life ==
Robinson originally attended Canton Preparatory High School in Canton, Michigan where he played basketball before transferring to Canton High School in Canton before his junior year to play football. He played defensive tackle, outside linebacker and tight end in high school. He committed to the University of Missouri to play college football.

== College career ==
Robinson played in five games as a freshman at Missouri in 2019 and had one tackle. As a sophomore in 2020, he played seven games with two starts at defensive tackle and had 11 tackles and one sack. As a junior in 2021, he started six of 10 games and recorded 21 tackles. Robinson played in all 13 games as a senior in 2022 with 10 starts, finishing the season with 35 tackles and 3.5 sacks. He returned to Missouri for his final season in 2023 and switched from defensive tackle to defensive end.

== Professional career ==
Pre-draft measurables
Height	Weight	Arm length	Hand span	Wingspan	40-yard dash	10-yard split	20-yard split	20-yard shuttle	Three-cone drill	Vertical jump	Broad jump	Bench press
6 ft 5 1/8 in (1.96 m)	285 lb (129 kg)	34 1/2 in (0.88 m)	10 5/8 in (0.27 m)	7 ft 0 3/8 in (2.14 m)	4.95 s	1.73 s	2.90 s	4.76 s	7.87 s	35.0 in (0.89 m)	9 ft 3 in (2.82 m)	28 reps
All values from NFL Combine/Pro Day

Robinson was selected by the Arizona Cardinals in the first round (27th overall) of the 2024 NFL draft. The Cardinals had previously acquired the pick from the Houston Texans when they traded up to the third pick in the previous draft. He was placed on injured reserve on August 27, 2024 with a calf injury. He was activated on October 28.

== NFL career statistics ==
Legend
**Bold**	Career high

=== Regular season ===
Year	Team	Games		Tackles					Interceptions						Fumbles				
Year	Team	GP	GS	Cmb	Solo	Ast	Sck	TFL	Int	Yds	Avg	Lng	TD	PD	FF	Fmb	FR	Yds	TD
2024	ARI	6	0	10	4	6	**1.0**	1	0	0	0.0	0	0	0	0	0	0	0	0
2025	ARI	15	12	**43**	**15**	**28**	**1.0**	**4**	0	0	0.0	0	0	0	0	0	**1**	0	0
2026	ARI	5	0	14	7	7	**1.0**	2	0	0	0.0	0	0	0	0	0	0	0	0
Career		26	12	67	26	41	3.0	7	0	0	0.0	0	0	0	0	0	1	0	0
