= Beaux Limmer =

American football player (born 2001)

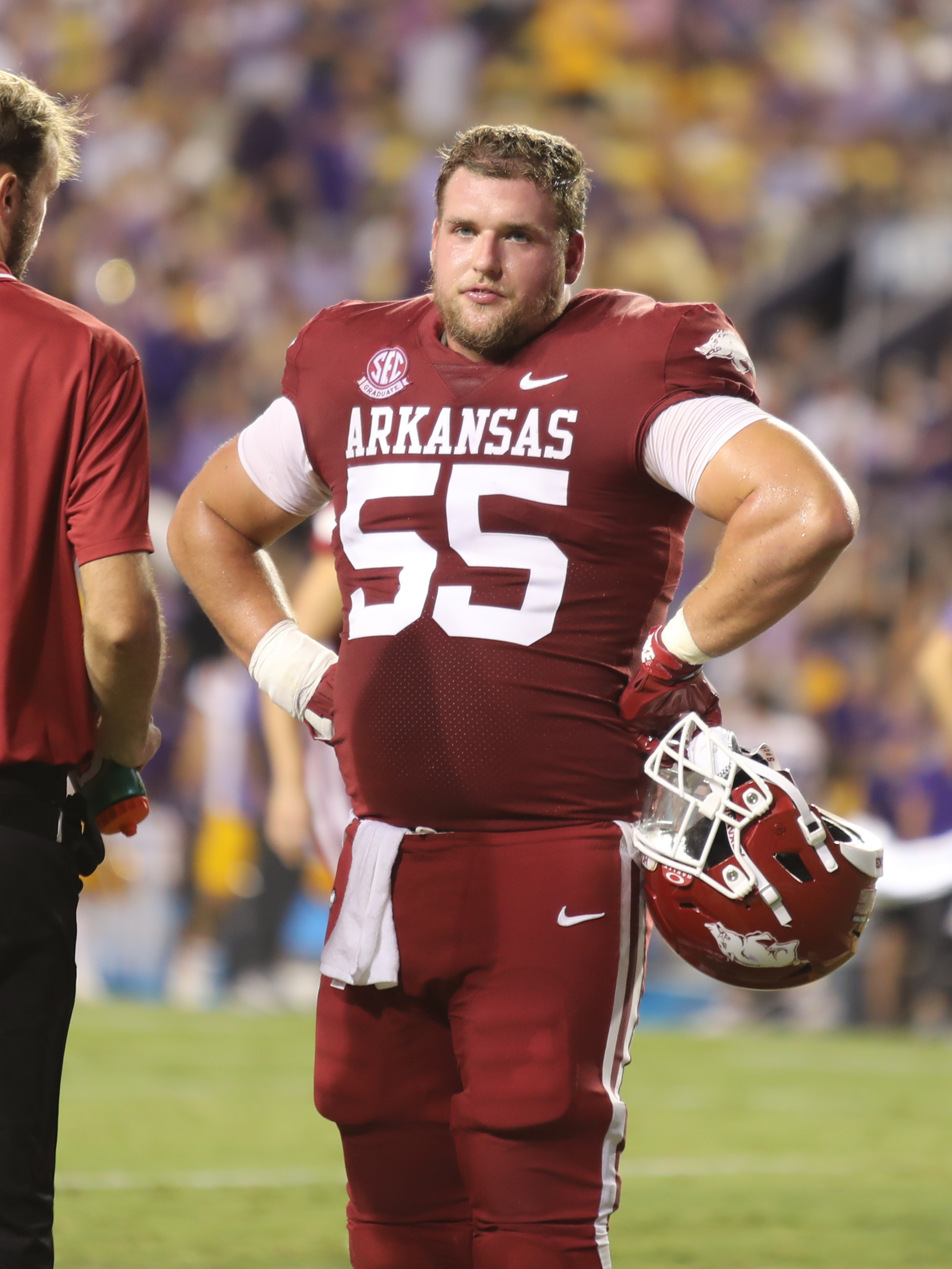
- Limmer with the Arkansas Razorbacks in 2023

No. 50 – Los Angeles Rams
- Position: Guard
- Roster status: Active

Personal information
- Born: June 10, 2001 (age 25); Tyler, Texas, U.S.
- Listed height: 6 ft 5 in (1.96 m)
- Listed weight: 318 lb (144 kg)

Career information
- High school: Robert E. Lee (Tyler)
- College: Arkansas (2019–2023)
- NFL draft: 2024: 6th round, 217th overall pick

Career history
- Los Angeles Rams (2024–present)

Awards and highlights
- Second-team All-SEC (2022)

Career NFL statistics as of Week 1, 2026
- Games played: 22
- Games started: 14
- Stats at Pro Football Reference

Beaux Limmer (born June 10, 2001) is an American professional football guard for the Los Angeles Rams of the National Football League (NFL). He played college football for the Arkansas Razorbacks.

== Early life ==
Limmer was born on June 10, 2001 in Tyler, Texas, the son of David and Susan Limmer. He attended Robert E. Lee High School in Tyler.

== College football ==
Limmer enrolled at the University of Arkansas in 2019. As a redshirt sophomore in 2021, he started the last 11 games for the Razorbacks. As a redshirt junior in 2022, he started all 13 games, the first 12 at right guard before switching to center for the Liberty Bowl. He was selected by Pro Football Focus as a third-team All-American.

A video of Limmer squatting 700 pounds went viral in the summer of 2023. In August 2023, Pro Football Focus ranked Limmer at No. 27 on its list of the 50 best players in college football.

Limmer moved to the center position for Arkansas in 2023. Prior to the 2023 season, he was also named to the watch lists for the Outland and Rimington Trophies.

== Professional career ==
Pre-draft measurables
Height	Weight	Arm length	Hand span	Wingspan	40-yard dash	10-yard split	20-yard split	20-yard shuttle	Three-cone drill	Vertical jump	Broad jump	Bench press
6 ft 4 5/8 in (1.95 m)	302 lb (137 kg)	31 7/8 in (0.81 m)	9 1/2 in (0.24 m)	6 ft 5 7/8 in (1.98 m)	5.22 s	1.75 s	2.98 s	4.57 s	7.47 s	36.5 in (0.93 m)	9 ft 2 in (2.79 m)	39 reps
All values from NFL Combine

Limmer was selected by the Los Angeles Rams with the 217th overall pick in the sixth round of the 2024 NFL draft. As a rookie, he appeared in 16 games and started 14.
