= Jason Marshall Jr. =

American football player (born 2002)

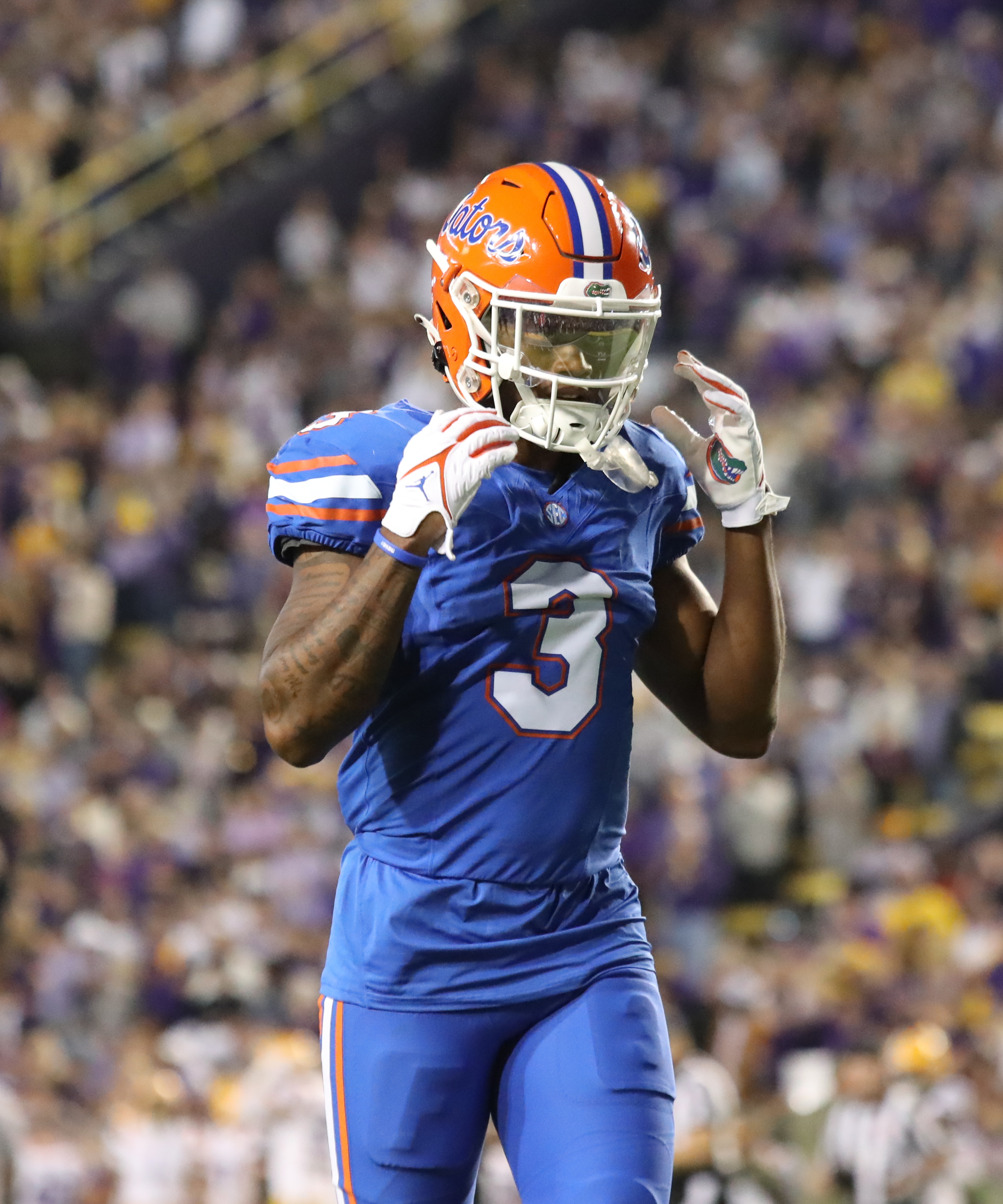
- Marshall Jr. with the Florida Gators in 2023

No. 4 – Miami Dolphins
- Position: Cornerback
- Roster status: Active

Personal information
- Born: September 6, 2002 (age 24)
- Listed height: 6 ft 0 in (1.83 m)
- Listed weight: 204 lb (93 kg)

Career information
- High school: Miami Palmetto (Pinecrest, Florida)
- College: Florida (2021–2024)
- NFL draft: 2025: 5th round, 150th overall pick

Career history
- Miami Dolphins (2025–present)

Career NFL statistics as of Week 3, 2026
- Total tackles: 35
- Pass deflections: 4
- Interceptions: 1
- Stats at Pro Football Reference

Jason Marshall Jr. (born September 6, 2002) is an American professional football cornerback for the Miami Dolphins of the National Football League (NFL). He played college football for the Florida Gators and was selected by the Dolphins in the fifth round of the 2025 NFL draft.

== Early life ==
Marshall was born on September 6, 2002. He attended Miami Palmetto High School in Pinecrest, Florida, where played high school football. He played both offense and defense but was primarily recruited as a corner. As a senior he helped Palmetto reach the semi-finals of the state playoffs. Following his senior season he was invited to the Under Armour All-American Bowl. A five-star prospect, he committed to play college football at the University of Florida.

== College career ==
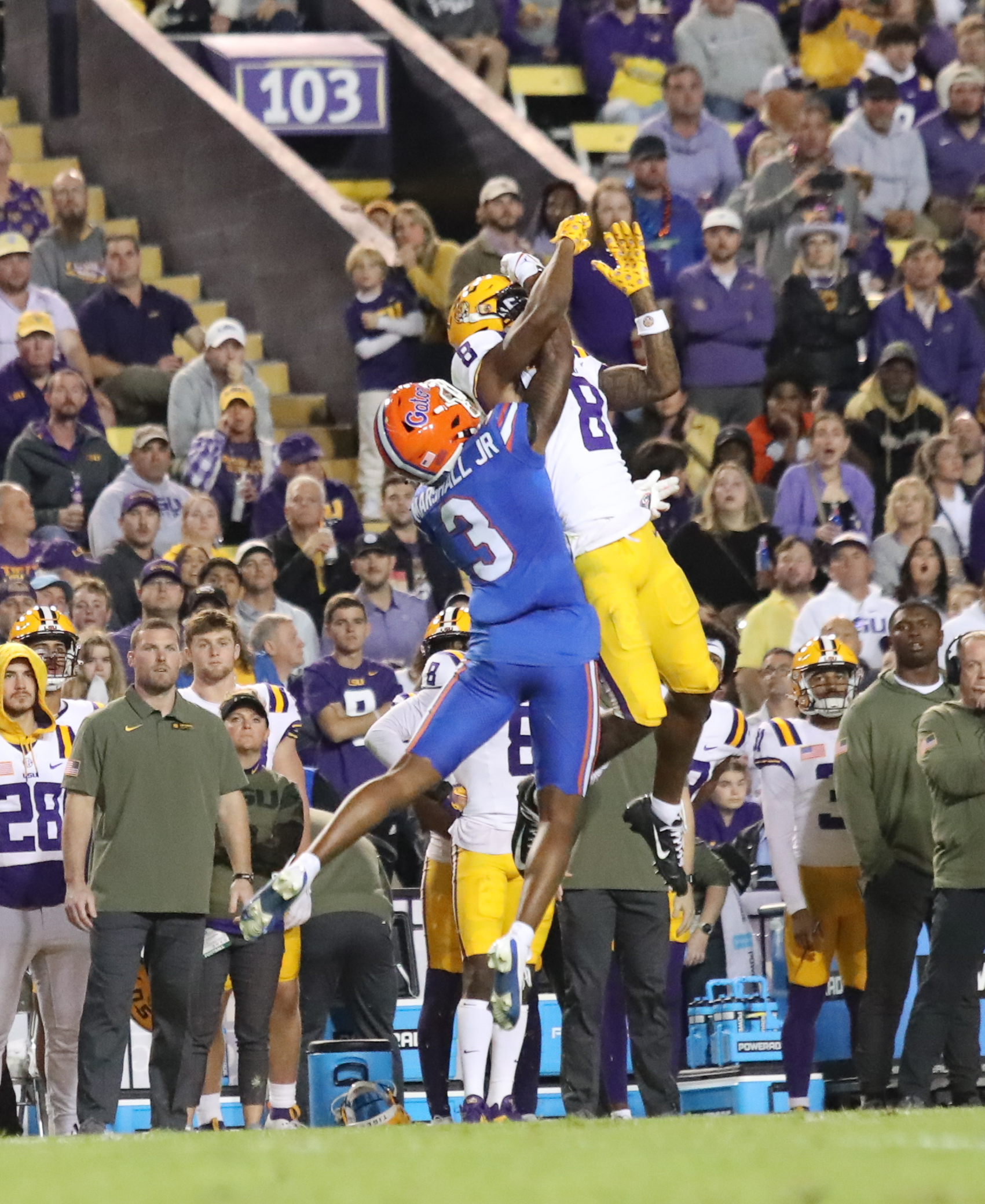
Marshall defending against LSU Tigers player Malik Nabers in 2023

As a freshman in 2021, Marshall would start five games, allowing a completion percentage of 36.8%, the second lowest of any corner in the country. As a sophomore he started all 13 games for the Gators, recording eight pass breakups, 29 tackles and an interception.

== Professional career ==
Pre-draft measurables
Height	Weight	Arm length	Hand span	Wingspan	40-yard dash	10-yard split	20-yard split	Vertical jump	Broad jump
6 ft 0 3/8 in (1.84 m)	194 lb (88 kg)	30 1/4 in (0.77 m)	9 1/4 in (0.23 m)	6 ft 3 5/8 in (1.92 m)	4.49 s	1.55 s	2.60 s	37.5 in (0.95 m)	10 ft 5 in (3.18 m)
All values from NFL Combine

Marshall was selected in the fifth round, with the 150th pick of the 2025 NFL draft by the Miami Dolphins.
