= Cedric Johnson =

American football player (born 2002)

No. 52 – Cincinnati Bengals
- Position: Defensive end
- Roster status: Active

Personal information
- Born: September 6, 2002 (age 24); Mobile, Alabama, U.S.
- Listed height: 6 ft 3 in (1.91 m)
- Listed weight: 264 lb (120 kg)

Career information
- High school: Davidson (Mobile)
- College: Ole Miss (2020–2023)
- NFL draft: 2024: 6th round, 214th overall pick

Career history
- Cincinnati Bengals (2024–present)

Career NFL statistics as of Week 9, 2026
- Total tackles: 42
- Sacks: 5.0
- Fumble recoveries: 2
- Stats at Pro Football Reference

Cedric Edward Johnson (born September 6, 2002) is an American professional football defensive end for the Cincinnati Bengals of the National Football League (NFL). He played college football for the Ole Miss Rebels.

== Early life ==
Johnson attended Davidson High School in Mobile, Alabama. As a senior, he had 56 tackles and 16 sacks. He committed to the University of Mississippi to play college football.

== College career ==
As a true freshman at Ole Miss in 2020, Johnson played in all 10 games as a linebacker and had seven tackles and three sacks. As a sophomore in 2021, he started 11 of 13 games at defensive end, recording 33 tackles and 6.5 sacks. He started eight of 11 games his junior year in 2022, finishing the season with 32 tackles and four sacks. Johnson returned to Ole Miss for his senior season in 2023. He was selected to play in the 2024 Senior Bowl.

== Professional career ==
Pre-draft measurables
Height	Weight	Arm length	Hand span	Wingspan	40-yard dash	10-yard split	20-yard split	20-yard shuttle	Three-cone drill	Vertical jump	Broad jump	Bench press
6 ft 3 in (1.91 m)	260 lb (118 kg)	33 1/2 in (0.85 m)	9 7/8 in (0.25 m)	6 ft 7 3/8 in (2.02 m)	4.63 s	1.61 s	2.70 s	4.36 s	7.45 s	38.0 in (0.97 m)	10 ft 2 in (3.10 m)	25 reps
All values from NFL Combine/Pro Day

Johnson was selected by the Cincinnati Bengals in the sixth round (214th overall) of the 2024 NFL draft. He made nine appearances for the Bengals during his rookie campaign, recording one sack and seven combined tackles.

Johnson began the 2025 season on injured reserve due to a calf injury; he was activated on October 31, 2025, ahead of the team's Week 9 matchup against the Chicago Bears.

== NFL career statistics ==
Legend
**Bold**	Career high

=== Regular season ===
Year	Team	Games		Tackles					Interceptions						Fumbles				
Year	Team	GP	GS	Cmb	Solo	Ast	Sck	TFL	Int	Yds	Avg	Lng	TD	PD	FF	Fum	FR	Yds	TD
2024	CIN	9	0	7	5	2	1.0	1	0	0	0.0	0	0	0	0	0	0	0	0
2025	CIN	9	0	**20**	**11**	**9**	**2.0**	**2**	0	0	0.0	0	0	0	0	0	**2**	**4**	0
Career		18	0	27	16	11	3.0	3	0	0	0.0	0	0	0	0	0	2	4	0
