= Nehemiah Pritchett =

American football player (born 2001)

No. 28 – Seattle Seahawks
- Position: Cornerback
- Roster status: Active

Personal information
- Born: February 11, 2001 (age 25); Jackson, Alabama, U.S.
- Listed height: 6 ft 0 in (1.83 m)
- Listed weight: 190 lb (86 kg)

Career information
- High school: Jackson (AL)
- College: Auburn (2019–2023)
- NFL draft: 2024: 5th round, 136th overall pick

Career history
- Seattle Seahawks (2024–present)

Awards and highlights
- Super Bowl champion (LX)

Career NFL statistics as of Week 1, 2026
- Total tackles: 32
- Pass deflections: 5
- Interceptions: 1
- Stats at Pro Football Reference

Nehemiah Pritchett (born February 11, 2001) is an American professional football cornerback for the Seattle Seahawks of the National Football League (NFL). He played college football for the Auburn Tigers.

== Early life ==
Pritchett attended Jackson High School in Jackson, Alabama. During his senior season, Pritchett recorded 40 tackles, six interceptions, and two tackles for a loss, along with eight offensive touchdowns. He was named to the Alabama High School All-Star roster in 2018. A three-star recruit, Pritchett committed to play college football at Auburn University over offers from Minnesota, Nebraska, and Ole Miss.

== College career ==
Pritchett tallied 93 tackles, one sack, and two interceptions over the course of four seasons. He started every game in the 2022 season, finishing with 37 tackles, eight pass deflections, and a forced fumble. In 2021, he scored an 80-yard touchdown on a blocked field goal. Pritchett announced that he would return to Auburn for another season in 2023 rather than enter the 2023 NFL draft.

== Professional career ==
Pre-draft measurables
Height	Weight	Arm length	Hand span	Wingspan	40-yard dash	10-yard split	20-yard split	20-yard shuttle	Three-cone drill	Vertical jump	Broad jump
6 ft 0 1/8 in (1.83 m)	190 lb (86 kg)	31 5/8 in (0.80 m)	8 3/8 in (0.21 m)	6 ft 3 in (1.91 m)	4.36 s	1.49 s	2.56 s	4.26 s	7.09 s	34.5 in (0.88 m)	9 ft 11 in (3.02 m)
All values from NFL Combine/Pro Day

Pritchett was selected by the Seattle Seahawks in the fifth round (136th overall) of the 2024 NFL draft. On July 18, 2024, Pritchett was placed on the Active/Non-football injury or illness (NFI) list. On July 23, he was removed from the NFI list after he passed his physical.

In Week 1 of the 2026 season against the New England Patriots, Pritchett recorded his first career interception against Drake Maye, helping fuel Seattle to a 13–10 victory.
