= 2022 Southeastern Conference football season =

- League: NCAA Division I FBS football season
- Sport: Football
- Duration: August 27, 2022 through December 3, 2022
- Teams: 14
- TV partner(s): (CBS (ESPN, ESPN2, ESPN3, ESPNU, SEC Network, ESPN+)

2023 NFL draft
- Top draft pick: QB Bryce Young, Alabama
- Picked by: Carolina Panthers, 1st overall

Regular season
- East champions: Georgia
- East runners-up: Tennessee
- West champions: LSU
- West runners-up: Alabama

SEC Championship Game
- Date: December 3, 2022
- Venue: Mercedes-Benz Stadium, Atlanta, Georgia
- Champions: Georgia
- Runners-up: LSU
- Finals MVP: Stetson Bennett, QB

Football seasons
- 2021 2023

2022 Southeastern Conference football standings
	Conf.			Overall
Team	W		L	W		L
Eastern Division
No. 1 Georgia xy$#^	8	–	0	15	–	0
No. 6 Tennessee	6	–	2	11	–	2
No. 23 South Carolina	4	–	4	8	–	5
Kentucky	3	–	5	7	–	6
Florida	3	–	5	6	–	7
Missouri	3	–	5	6	–	7
Vanderbilt	2	–	6	5	–	7
Western Division
No. 16 LSU xy	6	–	2	10	–	4
No. 5 Alabama x	6	–	2	11	–	2
No. 20 Mississippi State	4	–	4	9	–	4
Ole Miss	4	–	4	8	–	5
Arkansas	3	–	5	7	–	6
Auburn	2	–	6	5	–	7
Texas A&M	2	–	6	5	–	7
Championship: Georgia 50, LSU 30
# – College Football Playoff champion; ^ – College Football Playoff participant; $ – Conference champion; x – Division champion/co-champions; y – Championship game participant; Rankings from AP Poll

The 2022 Southeastern Conference football season is the 90th season of Southeastern Conference (SEC) football, taking place during the 2022 NCAA Division I FBS football season. The season began on August 27, 2022 and ended with the 2022 SEC Championship Game on December 3, 2022. The SEC is a Power Five conference as part of the College Football Playoff system.

== Preseason ==
2022 SEC Spring Football and number of signees on signing day:

East Division

- Georgia –
- Florida –
- Kentucky –
- Missouri –
- South Carolina –
- Tennessee –
- Vanderbilt -

West Division

- Alabama –
- Arkansas –
- Auburn –
- LSU –
- Mississippi State –
- Ole Miss –
- Texas A&M -

=== Recruiting classes ===
National Rankings
Team	ESPN	Rivals	24/7	On3 Recruits	Total Signees
Alabama	2	2	2	2	
Arkansas		26	28	25	
Auburn		18	21	18	
Florida		20	17	20	
Georgia	3	3	3	3	
Kentucky		14	14	15	
LSU		15	12	13	
Ole Miss		29	23	21	
Mississippi State		16	27	23	
Missouri		12	15	16	
South Carolina		27	25	26	
Tennessee		13	18	17	
Texas A&M	1	1	1	1	
Vanderbilt		35	32	32	

=== SEC Media Days ===
The 2022 SEC Media days were held on July 18–21, 2022 at College Football Hall of Fame and The Omni Atlanta Hotel at CNN Center in Atlanta, GA. The Preseason Polls were released in July 2022. Each team had their head coach available to talk to the media at the event. Coverage of the event was televised on SEC Network and ESPN.

The teams and representatives in respective order were as follows:

- SEC Commissioner – Greg Sankey
- Monday July 18
  - LSU – Brian Kelly (HC), Jack Bech (WR), Mike Jones Jr. (LB) and BJ Ojulari (DE)
  - Ole Miss – Lane Kiffin (HC), Jonathan Mingo (WR), Cedric Johnson (DE) and Nick Broeker (OL)
  - Missouri - Eliah Drinkwitz (HC), Barrett Banister (WR), Martez Manuel (DB) and Isaiah McGuire (DL)
- Tuesday July 19
  - Alabama – Nick Saban (HC), Bryce Young (QB), Jordan Battle (DL) and Will Anderson Jr. (LB)
  - Mississippi State – Mike Leach (HC), Jaden Crumedy (DT), Nathaniel Watson (LB) and Austin Williams (WR)
  - South Carolina – Shane Beamer (HC), Jovaughn Gwyn (OL), Dakereon Joyner (WR), Zacch Pickens (DL)
  - Vanderbilt – Clark Lea (HC), Ben Bresnahan (TE), Anfernee Orji (LB) and Mike Wright (QB)
- Wednesday July 20
  - Arkansas – Sam Pittman (HC), Jalen Catalon (S), KJ Jefferson (QB) and Bumper Pool (LB)
  - Florida – Billy Napier (HC), Anthony Richardson (QB), Richard Gouraige (OL) and Ventrell Miller (LB)
  - Georgia – Kirby Smart (HC), Stetson Bennett IV (QB), Nolan Smith (LB) and Sedrick Van Pran-Granger (OL)
  - Kentucky – Mark Stoops (HC), Will Levis (QB), Kenneth Horsey (OG) and DeAndre Square (LB)
- Thursday July 21
  - Auburn – Bryan Harsin (HC), Tank Bigsby (RB), Derick Hall (DE) and John Samuel Shenker (TE)
  - Tennessee - Josh Heupel (HC), Trevon Flowers (S), Hendon Hooker (QB) and Cedric Tillman (WR)
  - Texas A&M – Jimbo Fisher (HC), Demani Richardson (DB), Layden Robinson (OL) and Ainias Smith (WR)

==== Preseason media polls ====
East
Predicted finish	Team	Votes (1st place)
1	Georgia	1254 (172)
2	Kentucky	932 (4)
3	Tennessee	929 (1)
4	Florida	712
5	South Carolina	662 (3)
6	Missouri	383
7	Vanderbilt	196 (1)

West
Predicted finish	Team	Votes (1st place)
1	Alabama	1262 (177)
2	Texas A&M	968 (3)
3	Arkansas	844 (1)
4	Ole Miss	675
5	LSU	591
6	Mississippi State	390
7	Auburn	338

Media poll (SEC Championship)
Rank	Team	Votes
1	Alabama	158
2	Georgia	18
3	South Carolina	3
4	Texas A&M	1
5	Vanderbilt	1

=== Preseason awards ===
==== All−American Teams ====
	AP 1st Team	AP 2nd Team	AS 1st Team	AS 2nd Team	WCFF 1st Team	WCFF 2nd Team	ESPN	CBS 1st Team	CBS 2nd Team	CFN 1st Team	CFN 2nd Team	PFF 1st Team	PFF 2nd Team	SN 1st Team	SN 2nd Team
Ainias Smith, WR/PR, Texas A&M			✓	✓				✓							
Antonio Johnson, DB, Texas A&M	✓		✓		✓			✓			✓	✓		✓	
BJ Ojulari, LB, LSU															✓
Brock Bowers, TE, Georgia	✓		✓		✓		✓	✓		✓					✓
Bryce Young, QB, Alabama	✓		✓		✓		✓	✓		✓		✓		✓	
Bumper Pool, LB, Arkansas											✓				
Cam Smith, DB, South Carolina		✓	✓		✓		✓		✓			✓			✓
Dallas Turner, LB, Alabama							✓								
Eli Ricks, DB, Alabama	✓				✓				✓	✓		✓			✓
Emil Ekiyor Jr., OL, Alabama		✓							✓		✓			✓	
Gervon Dexter, DL, Florida						✓									✓
Harrison Mevis, K, Missouri		✓	✓				✓		✓			✓			
Jahmyr Gibbs, RB/KR, Alabama		✓	✓	✓					✓					✓	
Jalen Carter, DL, Georgia	✓		✓		✓		✓	✓		✓		✓		✓	
Jalen Catalon, DB, Arkansas		✓		✓			✓		✓						✓
Jordan Battle, DB, Alabama	✓		✓				✓	✓		✓			✓	✓	
Kayshon Boutte, WR, LSU	✓			✓	✓				✓		✓	✓			
Kelee Ringo, DB, Georgia	✓		✓		✓			✓		✓			✓	✓	
Layden Robinson, OL, Texas A&M							✓								
Nick Broeker, OL, Ole Miss				✓											
Nik Constantinou, P, Texas A&M												✓			
Nolan Smith, LB, Georgia				✓					✓		✓	✓			
O'Cyrus Torrence, OL, Florida		✓			✓				✓			✓			
Ricky Stromberg, OL, Arkansas											✓				
Tayvion Robinson, WR/PR, Kentucky												✓			
Tykee Smith, DB, Georgia									✓						
Will Anderson Jr., LB, Alabama	✓		✓		✓		✓	✓		✓		✓		✓	

==== Individual awards ====
Award	Head Coach/Player	School	Position	Year	Ref
Lott Trophy	Will Anderson Jr.	Alabama	LB	Jr.	
Lott Trophy	Jordan Battle	Alabama	DB	Sr.	
Lott Trophy	Henry To'oTo'o	Alabama	LB	Sr.	
Lott Trophy	Derick Hall	Auburn	DL	Sr.	
Lott Trophy	Jalen Carter	Georgia	DT	Jr.	
Lott Trophy	Kelee Ringo	Georgia	CB	(redshirt) Jr.	
Lott Trophy	J. J. Weaver	Kentucky	LB	Jr.	
Lott Trophy	BJ Ojulari	LSU	DE	Jr.	
Lott Trophy	Kris Abrams-Draine	Missouri	DB	Jr.	
Lott Trophy	Troy Brown	Ole Miss	LB	Sr.	
Lott Trophy	Jeremy Banks	Tennessee	LB	Sr.	
Lott Trophy	Antonio Johnson	Texas A&M	CB	So.	
Dodd Trophy	Nick Saban	Alabama	HC	——	
Dodd Trophy	Sam Pittman	Arkansas	HC	——	
Dodd Trophy	Kirby Smart	Georgia	HC	——	
Dodd Trophy	Mark Stoops	Kentucky	HC	——	
Dodd Trophy	Lane Kiffin	Ole Miss	HC	——	
Dodd Trophy	Jimbo Fisher	Texas A&M	HC	——	
Maxwell Award	Bryce Young	Alabama	QB	Jr.	
Maxwell Award	Will Anderson Jr.	Alabama	LB	Jr.	
Maxwell Award	KJ Jefferson	Arkansas	QB	(redshirt) Jr.	
Maxwell Award	Tank Bigsby	Auburn	RB	Jr.	
Maxwell Award	Anthony Richardson	Florida	QB	(redshirt) So.	
Maxwell Award	Stetson Bennett	Georgia	QB	Sr.	
Maxwell Award	Brock Bowers	Georgia	TE	So.	
Maxwell Award	Will Levis	Kentucky	QB	(redshirt) Sr.	
Maxwell Award	Chris Rodriguez Jr.	Kentucky	RB	Sr.	
Maxwell Award	Kayshon Boutte	LSU	WR	Jr.	
Maxwell Award	Hendon Hooker	Tennessee	QB	(redshirt) Sr.	
Maxwell Award	Cedric Tillman	Tennessee	WR	(redshirt) Sr.	
Maxwell Award	De’Von Achane	Texas A&M	RB	Jr.	
Maxwell Award	Mike Wright	Vanderbilt	QB	Jr.	
Davey O'Brien Award	Bryce Young	Alabama	QB	Jr.	
Davey O'Brien Award	KJ Jefferson	Arkansas	QB	Jr.	
Davey O'Brien Award	Stetson Bennett	Georgia	QB	Sr.	
Davey O'Brien Award	Will Levis	Kentucky	QB	Sr.	
Davey O'Brien Award	Will Rogers	Mississippi State	QB	Jr.	
Davey O'Brien Award	Spencer Rattler	South Carolina	QB	Jr.	
Davey O'Brien Award	Hendon Hooker	Tennessee	QB	(redshirt) Sr.	
Doak Walker Award	Tank Bigsby	Auburn	RB	Jr.	
Doak Walker Award	Nay'Quan Wright	Florida	RB	Jr.	
Doak Walker Award	Nathaniel Peat	Missouri	RB	Sr.	
Doak Walker Award	Jabari Small	Tennessee	RB	Jr.	
Doak Walker Award	De’Von Achane	Texas A&M	RB	Jr.	
Biletnikoff Award	Jermaine Burton	Alabama	WR	Jr.	
Biletnikoff Award	Brock Bowers	Georgia	TE	So.	
Biletnikoff Award	Kayshon Boutte	LSU	WR	Jr.	
Biletnikoff Award	Corey Rucker	South Carolina	WR	Jr.	
Biletnikoff Award	Cedric Tillman	Tennessee	WR	(redshirt) Sr.	

Award	Head Coach/Player	School	Position	Year	Ref
John Mackey Award	Cameron Latu	Alabama	TE	(redshirt) Sr.	
John Mackey Award	John Samuel Shenker	Auburn	TE	Sr.	
John Mackey Award	Arik Gilbert	Georgia	TE	(redshirt) So.	
John Mackey Award	Brock Bowers	Georgia	TE	So.	
John Mackey Award	Darnell Washington	Georgia	TE	Jr.	
John Mackey Award	Michael Trigg	Ole Miss	TE	So.	
John Mackey Award	Austin Stogner	South Carolina	TE	(redshirt) Graduate	
John Mackey Award	Jaheim Bell	South Carolina	TE	Jr.	
John Mackey Award	Jacob Warren	Tennessee	TE	RS Sr.	
John Mackey Award	Ben Bresnahan	Vanderbilt	TE	Sr.	
Rimington Trophy	Ricky Stromberg	Arkansas	OL	Sr.	
Rimington Trophy	Nick Brahms	Auburn	OL	Sr.	
Rimington Trophy	Kingsley Eguakun	Florida	OL	(redshirt) So.	
Rimington Trophy	Sedrick Van Pran-Granger	Georgia	OL	(redshirt) So.	
Rimington Trophy	LaQuinston Sharp	Mississippi State	OL	(redshirt) Sr.	
Rimington Trophy	Bryce Foster	Texas A&M	OL	So.	
Butkus Award	Henry To'oTo'o	Alabama	LB	Sr.	
Butkus Award	Jaylen Moody	Alabama	LB	(redshirt) Sr.	
Butkus Award	Bumper Pool	Arkansas	LB	Sr.	
Butkus Award	Owen Pappoe	Auburn	LB	Sr.	
Butkus Award	Ventrell Miller	Florida	LB	(redshirt) Sr.	
Butkus Award	Jamon Dumas-Johnson	Georgia	LB	So.	
Butkus Award	DeAndre Square	Kentucky	LB	(redshirt) Graduate	
Butkus Award	Micah Baskerville	LSU	LB	(redshirt) Graduate	
Butkus Award	Troy Brown	Ole Miss	LB	Sr.	
Butkus Award	Sherrod Greene	South Carolina	LB	(redshirt) Graduate	
Butkus Award	Jeremy Banks	Tennessee	LB	Sr.	
Butkus Award	Anfernee Orji	Vanderbilt	LB	Sr.	
Jim Thorpe Award	Jordan Battle	Alabama	DB	Sr.	
Jim Thorpe Award	Jalen Catalon	Arkansas	DB	(redshirt) Jr.	
Jim Thorpe Award	Christopher Smith II	Georgia	DB	Sr.	
Jim Thorpe Award	Kelee Ringo	Georgia	DB	(redshirt) Jr.	
Jim Thorpe Award	South Carolina	Jr.	DB		
Jim Thorpe Award	Antonio Johnson	Texas A&M	DB	So.	
Bronko Nagurski Trophy	Eli Ricks	Alabama	DB	Jr.	
Bronko Nagurski Trophy	Jordan Battle	Alabama	DB	Sr.	
Bronko Nagurski Trophy	Will Anderson Jr.	Alabama	LB	Jr.	
Bronko Nagurski Trophy	Henry To'oTo'o	Alabama	LB	Sr.	
Bronko Nagurski Trophy	Bumper Pool	Arkansas	LB	Sr.	
Bronko Nagurski Trophy	Jalen Catalon	Arkansas	DB	(redshirt) Jr.	
Bronko Nagurski Trophy	Derick Hall	Auburn	DL	Sr.	
Bronko Nagurski Trophy	Jalen Carter	Georgia	DT	Jr.	
Bronko Nagurski Trophy	Kelee Ringo	Georgia	CB	(redshirt) Jr.	
Bronko Nagurski Trophy	Nolan Smith	Georgia	LB	Sr.	
Bronko Nagurski Trophy	BJ Ojulari	LSU	DE	Jr.	
Bronko Nagurski Trophy	Emmanuel Forbes	Mississippi State	DB	Jr.	
Bronko Nagurski Trophy	Cam Smith	South Carolina	DB	Jr.	
Bronko Nagurski Trophy	Antonio Johnson	Texas A&M	DB	So.	
Outland Trophy	Emil Ekiyor Jr.	Alabama	OL	(redshirt) Sr.	
Outland Trophy	Justin Eboigbe	Alabama	DT	Sr.	
Outland Trophy	Ricky Stromberg	Arkansas	OL	Sr.	
Outland Trophy	Gervon Dexter	Florida	DL	So.	
Outland Trophy	O'Cyrus Torrence	Florida	OL	Jr.	
Outland Trophy	Broderick Jones	Georgia	OT	(redshirt) So.	
Outland Trophy	Jalen Carter	Georgia	DT	Jr.	
Outland Trophy	Warren Ericson	Georgia	OL	Sr.	
Outland Trophy	Eli Cox	Kentucky	C	Jr.	
Outland Trophy	Jaquelin Roy	LSU	DT	Jr.	
Outland Trophy	Nick Broeker	Ole Miss	OG	Sr.	
Outland Trophy	Dylan Wonnum	South Carolina	OT	(redshirt) Graduate	
Outland Trophy	Layden Robinson	Texas A&M	OL	Jr.	
Outland Trophy	McKinnley Jackson	Texas A&M	DT	Jr.	

Award	Head Coach/Player	School	Position	Year	Ref
Lou Groza Award	Will Reichard	Alabama	PK	Sr.	
Lou Groza Award	Cam Little	Arkansas	PK	So.	
Lou Groza Award	Jack Podlesny	Georgia	PK	Sr.	
Lou Groza Award	Harrison Mevis	Missouri	PK	Jr.	
Ray Guy Award	Reid Bauer	Arkansas	P	(redshirt) Graduate	
Ray Guy Award	Colin Goodfellow	Kentucky	P	(redshirt) Graduate	
Ray Guy Award	Jay Bramblett	LSU	P	Sr.	
Ray Guy Award	Kai Kroeger	South Carolina	P	Jr.	
Ray Guy Award	Paxton Brooks	Tennessee	P	Sr.	
Ray Guy Award	Nik Constantinou	Texas A&M	P	Jr.	
Ray Guy Award	Matthew Hayball	Vanderbilt	P	Jr.	
Paul Hornung Award	Jahmyr Gibbs	Alabama	RB	Jr.	
Paul Hornung Award	Tank Bigsby	Auburn	RB	Jr.	
Paul Hornung Award	Jo'Quavious Marks	Mississippi State	RB	Jr.	
Paul Hornung Award	De'Von Achane	Texas A&M	RB	Jr.	
Wuerffel Trophy	Jordan Battle	Alabama	DB	Sr.	
Wuerffel Trophy	Cam Little	Arkansas	PK	So.	
Wuerffel Trophy	Nick Brahms	Auburn	OL	Sr.	
Wuerffel Trophy	Nay'Quan Wright	Florida	RB	Jr.	
Wuerffel Trophy	Kearis Jackson	Georgia	WR/ST	Sr.	
Wuerffel Trophy	Jalen Geiger	Kentucky	DB	Jr.	
Wuerffel Trophy	Ali Gaye	LSU	DL	(redshirt) Graduate	
Wuerffel Trophy	Mike Jones Jr.	LSU	LB	Sr.	
Wuerffel Trophy	Austin Williams	Mississippi State	WR	Sr.	
Wuerffel Trophy	Barrett Banister	Missouri	WR	Sr.	
Wuerffel Trophy	KD Hill	Ole Miss	DL	Sr.	
Wuerffel Trophy	MarShawn Lloyd	South Carolina	RB	So.	
Wuerffel Trophy	Jacob Warren	Tennessee	TE	Sr.	
Wuerffel Trophy	Layden Robinson	Texas A&M	OL	Jr.	
Wuerffel Trophy	Ben Bresnahan	Vanderbilt	TE	Sr.	
Walter Camp Award	Bryce Young	Alabama	QB	Jr.	
Walter Camp Award	Eli Ricks	Alabama	CB	Jr.	
Walter Camp Award	Will Anderson Jr.	Alabama	LB	Jr.	
Walter Camp Award	Brock Bowers	Georgia	TE	So.	
Walter Camp Award	Jalen Carter	Georgia	DT	Jr.	
Walter Camp Award	Kelee Ringo	Georgia	CB	(redshirt) Jr.	
Walter Camp Award	Chris Rodriguez Jr.	Kentucky	RB	Sr.	
Walter Camp Award	Will Levis	Kentucky	QB	Sr.	
Walter Camp Award	Kayshon Boutte	LSU	WR	Jr.	
Walter Camp Award	Spencer Rattler	South Carolina	QB	Jr.	
Walter Camp Award	Cedric Tillman	Tennessee	WR	(redshirt) Sr.	
Bednarik Award	Henry To'oTo'o	Alabama	LB	Sr.	
Bednarik Award	Jordan Battle	Alabama	CB	Sr.	
Bednarik Award	Will Anderson Jr.	Alabama	LB	Jr.	
Bednarik Award	Bumper Pool	Arkansas	LB	Sr.	
Bednarik Award	Jalen Catalon	Arkansas	DB	Sr.	
Bednarik Award	Colby Wooden	Auburn	DB	Jr.	
Bednarik Award	Derick Hall	Auburn	DB	Sr.	
Bednarik Award	Brenton Cox Jr.	Florida	LB	Jr.	
Bednarik Award	Jalen Carter	Georgia	DT	Jr.	
Bednarik Award	Kelee Ringo	Georgia	CB	(redshirt) Jr.	
Bednarik Award	Nolan Smith	Georgia	LB	Sr.	
Bednarik Award	BJ Ojulari	LSU	DE	Jr.	
Bednarik Award	Emmanuel Forbes	Mississippi State	DB	Jr.	
Bednarik Award	Isaiah McGuire	Missouri	DE	Sr.	
Bednarik Award	Antonio Johnson	Texas A&M	CB	So.	
Bednarik Award	Anfernee Orji	Vanderbilt	LB	Sr.	
Rotary Lombardi Award	Henry To'oTo'o	Alabama	LB	Sr.	
Rotary Lombardi Award	Will Anderson Jr.	Alabama	LB	Jr.	
Rotary Lombardi Award	Bumper Pool	Arkansas	LB	Sr.	
Rotary Lombardi Award	Derick Hall	Auburn	DE	Sr.	
Rotary Lombardi Award	O'Cyrus Torrence	Florida	OL	Jr.	
Rotary Lombardi Award	Brock Bowers	Georgia	TE	So.	
Rotary Lombardi Award	Jalen Carter	Georgia	DT	Jr.	
Rotary Lombardi Award	Nolan Smith	Georgia	LB	Sr.	
Rotary Lombardi Award	Ali Gaye	LSU	DE	(redshirt) Graduate	
Rotary Lombardi Award	Nick Broeker	Ole Miss	OG	Sr.	
Rotary Lombardi Award	Layden Robinson	Texas A&M	OG	Sr.	
Patrick Mannelly Award	Marco Ortiz	Florida	LS	(redshirt) Jr.	
Patrick Mannelly Award	Wesley Schelling	Vanderbilt	LS	Jr.	
Earl Campbell Tyler Rose Award	Jase McClellan	Alabama	RB	Jr.	
Earl Campbell Tyler Rose Award	Dominique Johnson	Arkansas	RB	Jr.	
Earl Campbell Tyler Rose Award	Tauskie Dove	Missouri	WR	(redshirt) Graduate	
Earl Campbell Tyler Rose Award	Zach Evans	Ole Miss	RB	Jr.	
Earl Campbell Tyler Rose Award	Austin Stogner	South Carolina	TE	(redshirt) Graduate	
Earl Campbell Tyler Rose Award	Ainias Smith	Texas A&M	WR	Sr.	
Polynesian College Football Player Of The Year Award	Cameron Latu	Alabama	TE	(redshirt) Sr.	
Polynesian College Football Player Of The Year Award	Henry To'oTo'o	Alabama	LB	Sr.	
Manning Award	Bryce Young	Alabama	QB	Jr.	
Manning Award	KJ Jefferson	Arkansas	QB	Jr.	
Manning Award	Stetson Bennett	Georgia	QB	Sr.	
Manning Award	Hendon Hooker	Tennessee	QB	Sr.	
Manning Award	Will Levis	Kentucky	QB	Sr.	
Manning Award	Will Rogers	Mississippi State	QB	Jr.	
Johnny Unitas Golden Arm Award	Bryce Young	Alabama	QB	Jr.	
Johnny Unitas Golden Arm Award	KJ Jefferson	Arkansas	QB	Jr.	
Johnny Unitas Golden Arm Award	Zach Calzada	Auburn	QB	(redshirt) So.	
Johnny Unitas Golden Arm Award	Anthony Richardson	Florida	QB	(redshirt) So.	
Johnny Unitas Golden Arm Award	Stetson Bennett	Georgia	QB	Sr.	
Johnny Unitas Golden Arm Award	Will Levis	Kentucky	QB	(redshirt) Sr.	
Johnny Unitas Golden Arm Award	Jayden Daniels	LSU	QB	Jr.	
Johnny Unitas Golden Arm Award	Will Rogers	Mississippi State	QB	Jr.	
Johnny Unitas Golden Arm Award	Spencer Rattler	South Carolina	QB	Jr.	
Johnny Unitas Golden Arm Award	Hendon Hooker	Tennessee	QB	(redshirt) Sr.	
Johnny Unitas Golden Arm Award	Haynes King	Texas A&M	QB	(redshirt) So.	
Ted Hendricks Award					

==== Preseason All-SEC ====
===== Media =====
First Team Offense
Position	Player	Class	Team
QB	Bryce Young	JR	Alabama
RB	Jahmyr Gibbs	JR	Alabama
RB	Tank Bigsby	JR	Auburn
WR	Jermaine Burton	JR	Alabama
WR	Kayshon Boutte	JR	LSU
TE	Brock Bowers	SO	Georgia
OL	Emil Ekiyor Jr.	RS SR	Alabama
OL	Warren McClendon	JR	Georgia
OL	O'Cyrus Torrence	JR	Florida
OL	Nick Broeker	SR	Ole Miss
C	Ricky Stromberg	SR	Arkansas

First Team Defense
Position	Player	Class	Team
DL	Derick Hall	SR	Auburn
DL	Jalen Carter	JR	Georgia
DL	BJ Ojulari	JR	LSU
DL	Byron Young	SR	Tennessee
LB	Henry To'oTo'o	SR	Alabama
LB	Nolan Smith	SR	Georgia
LB	Will Anderson Jr.	JR	Alabama
DB	Eli Ricks	JR	Alabama
DB	Jordan Battle	SR	Alabama
DB	Jalen Catalon	RS JR	Arkansas
DB	Kelee Ringo	RS SO	Georgia

First Team Special Teams
Position	Player	Class	Team
P	Nik Constantinou	SO	Texas A&M
K	Will Reichard	SR	Alabama
RS	Kearis Jackson	SR	Georgia
AP	Jahmyr Gibbs	JR	Alabama

Second Team Offense
Position	Player	Class	Team
QB	Hendon Hooker	SR	Tennessee
RB	Chris Rodriguez Jr.	SR	Kentucky
RB	De'Von Achane	JR	Texas A&M
WR	Jonathan Mingo	JR	Ole Miss
WR	Cedric Tillman	SR	Tennessee
TE	Cameron Latu	RS SR	Alabama
OL	Javion Cohen	JR	Alabama
OL	Kenneth Horsey	SR	Kentucky
OL	Darnell Wright	SR	Tennessee
OL	Layden Robinson	RS SO	Texas A&M
C	Sedrick Van Pran-Granger	RS SO	Georgia

Second Team Defense
Position	Player	Class	Team
DL	D. J. Dale	SR	Alabama
DL	Colby Wooden	JR	Auburn
DL	Ali Gaye	GS	LSU
DL	Zacch Pickens	SR	South Carolina
LB	Bumper Pool	SR	Arkansas
LB	Brenton Cox Jr.	RS JR	Florida
LB	Dallas Turner	SO	Alabama
DB	Cam Smith	RS JR	South Carolina
DB	Christopher Smith II	SR	Georgia
DB	Emmanuel Forbes	JR	Mississippi State
DB	Antonio Johnson	JR	Texas A&M

Second Team Special Teams
Position	Player	Class	Team
K	Oscar Chapman	JR	Auburn
P	Anders Carlson	SR	Auburn
RS	Ainias Smith	SR	Texas A&M
AP	De'Von Achane	JR	Texas A&M

Third Team Offense
Position	Player	Class	Team
QB	Will Levis	RS SR	Kentucky
RB	Kenny McIntosh	SR	Georgia
RB	Zach Evans	JR	Ole Miss
WR	Ainias Smith	SR	Texas A&M
WR	Josh Vann	GS	South Carolina
TE	Jaheim Bell	Jr	South Carolina
OL	Kendall Randolph	GS	Alabama
OL	Tyler Steen	GS	Alabama
OL	Brady Latham	RS JR	Arkansas
OL	Javon Foster	SR	Missouri
OL	Jeremy James	JR	Ole Miss
C	Cooper Mays	JR	Tennessee

Third Team Defense
Position	Player	Class	Team
DL	Justin Eboigbe	SR	Alabama
DL	Gervon Dexter	SO	Florida
DL	Maason Smith	SO	LSU
DL	McKinnley Jackson	JR	Texas A&M
LB	Owen Pappoe	SR	Auburn
LB	Ventrell Miller	GS	Florida
LB	Jeremy Banks	RS SR	Tennessee
DB	Malachi Moore	JR	Alabama
DB	Kool-Aid McKinstry	SO	Alabama
DB	Trey Dean	SR	Florida
DB	Trevon Flowers	SR	Tennessee

Third Team Special Teams
Position	Player	Class	Team
P	Paxton Brooks	SR	Tennessee
K	Harrison Mevis	JR	Missouri
RS	JoJo Earle	SO	Alabama
AP	Ainias Smith	SR	Texas A&M

===== Coaches =====
First Team Offense
Position	Player	Class	Team
QB	Bryce Young	JR	Alabama
RB	Tank Bigsby	JR	Auburn
RB	Chris Rodriguez Jr.	SR	Kentucky
WR	Kayshon Boutte	JR	LSU
WR	Cedric Tillman	SR	Tennessee
TE	Brock Bowers	SO	Georgia
OL	Warren McClendon	JR	Georgia
OL	Emil Ekiyor Jr.	RS SR	Alabama
OL	O'Cyrus Torrence	JR	Florida
OL	Layden Robinson	RS SO	Texas A&M
C	Ricky Stromberg	SR	Arkansas

First Team Defense
Position	Player	Class	Team
DL	Derick Hall	SR	Auburn
DL	Jalen Carter	JR	Georgia
DL	BJ Ojulari	JR	LSU
DL	Byron Young	SR	Tennessee
LB	Henry To'oTo'o	SR	Alabama
LB	Bumper Pool	SR	Arkansas
LB	Will Anderson Jr.	JR	Alabama
DB	Eli Ricks	JR	Alabama
DB	Jordan Battle	SR	Alabama
DB	Jalen Catalon	RS JR	Arkansas
DB	Kelee Ringo	RS SO	Georgia
DB	Cam Smith	RS JR	South Carolina

First Team Special Teams
Position	Player	Class	Team
K	Harrison Mevis	JR	Missouri
P	Nik Constantinou	SO	Texas A&M
RS	Ainias Smith	SR	Texas A&M
AP	Ainias Smith	SR	Texas A&M

Second Team Offense
Position	Player	Class	Team
QB	Hendon Hooker	SR	Tennessee
QB	Stetson Bennett	SR	Georgia
RB	De'Von Achane	JR	Texas A&M
RB	Jahmyr Gibbs	JR	Alabama
WR	Jermaine Burton	JR	Alabama
WR	Jonathan Mingo	SR	Ole Miss
TE	Cameron Latu	RS SR	Alabama
OL	Kenneth Horsey	SR	Kentucky
OL	Javon Foster	SR	Missouri
OL	Nick Broeker	SR	Ole Miss
OL	Darnell Wright	SR	Tennessee
C	Sedrick Van Pran-Granger	RS SO	Georgia

Second Team Defense
Position	Player	Class	Team
DL	Colby Wooden	JR	Auburn
DL	Zacch Pickens	SR	South Carolina
DL	Ali Gaye	GS	LSU
DL	Gervon Dexter	SO	Florida
LB	Nolan Smith	SR	Georgia
LB	Brenton Cox Jr.	RS JR	Florida
LB	Dallas Turner	SO	Alabama
DB	Christopher Smith II	SR	Georgia
DB	Emmanuel Forbes	JR	Mississippi State
DB	Antonio Johnson	JR	Texas A&M
DB	Malachi Moore	JR	Alabama

Second Team Special Teams
Position	Player	Class	Team
K	Will Reichard	SR	Alabama
P	Oscar Chapman	JR	Auburn
RS	Kearis Jackson	SR	Georgia
AP	Jahymr Gibbs	JR	Alabama

Third Team Offense
Position	Player	Class	Team
QB	Will Levis	RS SR	Kentucky
RB	Jabari Small	JR	Tennessee
RB	Zach Evans	JR	Ole Miss
WR	Ainias Smith	SR	Texas A&M
WR	Ladd McConkey	RS SO	Georgia
WR	Josh Vann	GS	South Carolina
WR	Jaden Walley	JR	Mississippi State
WR	Tayvion Robinson	SR	Kentucky
TE	Jaheim Bell	JR	South Carolina
OL	Javion Cohen	JR	Alabama
OL	Tyler Steen	GS	Alabama
OL	Brady Latham	RS JR	Arkansas
OL	Jeremy James	JR	Ole Miss
OL	Reuben Fatheree II	SO	Texas A&M
C	Bryce Foster	SO	Texas A&M

Third Team Defense
Position	Player	Class	Tram
DL	Jordan Davis	GS	Mississippi State
DL	D. J. Dale	SR	Alabama
DL	Justin Eboigbe	SR	Alabama
DL	Jordan Burch	JR	South Carolina
DL	Jaquelin Roy	JR	LSU
DL	Cedric Johnson	JR	Ole Miss
DL	Cameron Young	RS SR	Mississippi State
LB	Anfernee Orji	SR	Vanderbilt
LB	Ventrell Miller	RS SR	Florida
LB	Jeremy Banks	RS SR	Tennessee
LB	Anfernee Orji	SR	Vanderbilt
LB	Jacquez Jones	GS	Kentucky
LB	Tyrus Wheat	GS	Mississippi State
LB	DeAndre Square	GS	Kentucky
DB	A. J. Finley	SR	Ole Miss
DB	Brian Branch	JR	Alabama
DB	Kool-Aid McKinstry	SO	Alabama
DB	Kris Abrams-Draine	JR	Missouri
DB	Trey Dean	SR	Florida
DB	Trevon Flowers	SR	Tennessee

Third Team Special Teams
Position	Player	Class	Team
K	Anders Carlson	JR	Auburn
P	Paxton Brooks	SR	Tennessee
RS	JoJo Earle	SO	Alabama
AP	De'Von Achane	JR	Texas A&M

== Head coaches ==
There was two coaching changes before the 2022 season.

=== Coaches ===
Note: All stats current through the completion of the 2021 season

School	Coach	Year
Alabama	Nick Saban	16th
Arkansas	Sam Pittman	3rd
Auburn	Bryan Harsin	2nd
Florida	Billy Napier	1st
Georgia	Kirby Smart	7th
Kentucky	Mark Stoops	10th
LSU	Brian Kelly	1st
Mississippi State	Mike Leach	3rd
Missouri	Eliah Drinkwitz	3rd
Ole Miss	Lane Kiffin	3rd
South Carolina	Shane Beamer	2nd
Tennessee	Josh Heupel	2nd
Texas A&M	Jimbo Fisher	5th
Vanderbilt	Clark Lea	2nd

=== Mid-season changes ===
- On October 31, Auburn fired head coach Bryan Harsin after posting a 9–12 record with the school over two years. Cadillac Williams was named the interim head coach for the remainder of the season. On November 28, Auburn announced that they had signed Liberty head coach Hugh Freeze to take over their head coaching position beginning in 2023.

=== Post-season changes ===
- On December 12, Mississippi State head coach Mike Leach died after suffering a major heart attack. Mississippi State still elected to play in their bowl game. Defensive coordinator Zach Arnett was named interim head coach during Leach's hospitalization and promoted to permanent head coach after Leach's death.

== Rankings ==
		Pre	Wk 1	Wk 2	Wk 3	Wk 4	Wk 5	Wk 6	Wk 7	Wk 8	Wk 9	Wk 10	Wk 11	Wk 12	Wk 13	Wk 14	Final
Alabama	AP	1 (54)	1 (44)	2 (9)	2 (3)	2 (4)	1 (25)	3 (11)	6	6	6	10	8	8	6	5	5
Alabama	C	1 (54)	1 (57)	1 (39)	2 (24)	2 (26)	1 (34)	1 (35)	6	6	6	11	8	7	6	5	5
Alabama	CFP	Not released									6	9	8	7	6	5	
Arkansas	AP	19	16	10	10	20	RV		RV	RV	RV			RV			
Arkansas	C	23	17	11	10	19	25		RV	RV	RV						
Arkansas	CFP	Not released															
Auburn	AP	RV	RV	RV													
Auburn	C	RV	RV	RV													
Auburn	CFP	Not released															
Florida	AP	RV	12	18	20	RV	RV	RV					RV				
Florida	C	RV	19	21	22	RV	RV	RV					RV				
Florida	CFP	Not released															
Georgia	AP	3 (3)	2 (17)	1 (53)	1 (59)	1 (55)	2 (28)	1 (32)	1 (31)	1 (31)	1 (30)	1 (62)	1 (62)	1 (62)	1 (58)	1 (62)	1 (63)
Georgia	C	3 (6)	2 (6)	2 (25)	1 (40)	1 (34)	2 (23)	2 (18)	1 (43)	1 (43)	1 (45)	1 (61)	1 (61)	1 (59)	1 (60)	1 (59)	1 (63)
Georgia	CFP	Not released									3	1	1	1	1	1	
Kentucky	AP	20	20	9	8	7	13	22	19	19	RV	RV					
Kentucky	C	21	20	10	9	8	13	22	18	17	24	24	RV				
Kentucky	CFP	Not released										24					
LSU	AP	RV			RV	RV	25	RV	RV	18	15	7	6	6	11	16	16
LSU	C	RV			RV	RV	RV	RV	RV	20	17	8	7	6	13	15	15
LSU	CFP	Not released									10	7	6	5	14	17	
Mississippi State	AP	RV	RV	RV			23	16	24	RV	RV	RV		RV	25	24	20
Mississippi State	C	RV	RV	RV	RV	RV	23	17	24	RV	RV	RV		RV	25	23	19
Mississippi State	CFP	Not released													24	22	
Missouri	AP																
Missouri	C																
Missouri	CFP	Not released															
Ole Miss	AP	21	22	20	16	14	9	9	7	15	11	11	14	20	RV	RV	
Ole Miss	C	24	23	17	13	11	9	9	7	12	10	9	14	19	RV	RV	RV
Ole Miss	CFP	Not released									11	11	14	20			
South Carolina	AP	RV	RV					RV	RV	25	RV	RV		RV	20	20	23
South Carolina	C		RV					RV	RV	25	RV	RV		RV	20	19	23
South Carolina	CFP	Not released													19	19	
Tennessee	AP	RV	24	15	11	8	8	6	3 (15)	3 (13)	2т (18)	5	5	9	7	6	6
Tennessee	C	RV	RV	16	12	9	8	8	4 (2)	3 (2)	3 (5)	5	5	11	8	6	6
Tennessee	CFP	Not released									1	5	5	10	7	6	
Texas A&M	AP	6	6	24	23	17	RV										
Texas A&M	C	7	6	22	20	17	RV	RV									
Texas A&M	CFP	Not released															
Vanderbilt	AP																
Vanderbilt	C																
Vanderbilt	CFP	Not released															

Legend
	Improvement in ranking
	Drop in ranking
	Not ranked previous week
	No change in ranking from previous week
RV	Received votes but were not ranked in Top 25 of poll
т	Tied with team above or below also with this symbol

== Regular season ==
The 2022 schedule was released on September 21, 2021. The season began on August 27, 2022, and will end with the SEC Championship Game on December 3, 2022.

=== Week Zero ===
Date	Time	Visiting team	Home team	Site	TV	Result	Attendance	Ref.
August 27	9:30 p.m.	Vanderbilt	Hawaii	Clarence T. C. Ching Athletics Complex • Honolulu, HI	CBSSN	W 63–10	9,346	
^{#}Rankings from AP Poll released prior to game. All times are in Central Time.

=== Week One ===
Date	Time	Visiting team	Home team	Site	TV	Result	Attendance	Ref.
September 1	6:00 p.m.	Ball State	Tennessee	Neyland Stadium • Knoxville, TN	SECN	W 59–10	92,236	
September 1	7:00 p.m.	Louisiana Tech	Missouri	Faurot Field • Columbia, MO	ESPNU	W 52–24	47,653	
September 3	11:00 a.m.	Sam Houston State	No. 6 Texas A&M	Kyle Field • College Station, TX	SECN	W 31–0	97,946	
September 3	2:30 p.m.	No. 23 Cincinnati	No. 19 Arkansas	Donald W. Reynolds Razorback Stadium • Fayetteville, AR	ESPN	W 31–24	74,751	
September 3	2:30 p.m.	No. 11 Oregon	No. 3 Georgia	Mercedes-Benz Stadium • Atlanta, GA (Chick-fil-A Kickoff Game)	ABC	W 49–3	76,490	
September 3	3:00 p.m.	Troy	No. 21 Ole Miss	Vaught-Hemingway Stadium • Oxford, MS	SECN	W 28–10	60,533	
September 3	6:00 p.m.	No. 7 Utah	Florida	Ben Hill Griffin Stadium • Gainesville, FL	ESPN	W 29–26	90,799	
September 3	6:00 p.m.	No. 23 (FCS) Mercer	Auburn	Jordan-Hare Stadium • Auburn, AL	SECN+/ESPN+	W 42–16	84,562	
September 3	6:00 p.m.	Miami (OH)	No. 20 Kentucky	Kroger Field • Lexington, KY	SECN+/ESPN+	W 37–13	61,139	
September 3	6:00 p.m.	Elon	Vanderbilt	FirstBank Stadium • Nashville, TN	SECN+/ESPN+	W 42–31	20,120	
September 3	6:30 p.m.	Utah State	No. 1 Alabama	Bryant-Denny Stadium • Tuscaloosa, AL	SECN	W 55–0	98,321	
September 3	6:30 p.m.	Memphis	Mississippi State	Davis Wade Stadium • Starkville, MS	ESPNU	W 49–23	50,360	
September 3	6:30 p.m.	Georgia State	South Carolina	Williams-Brice Stadium • Columbia, SC	SECN+/ESPN+	W 35–14	78,297	
September 4	6:30 p.m.	Florida State	LSU	Caesars Superdome • New Orleans, LA (Louisiana Kickoff)	ABC	L 23–24	68,388	
^{#}Rankings from AP Poll released prior to game. All times are in Central Time.

=== Week Two ===
Date	Time	Visiting team	Home team	Site	TV	Result	Attendance	Ref.
September 10	11:00 a.m.	Missouri	Kansas State	Bill Snyder Family Stadium • Manhattan, KS	ESPN2	L 6–40	51,806	
September 10	11:00 a.m.	No. 1 Alabama	Texas	Darrell K Royal–Texas Memorial Stadium • Austin, TX	FOX	W 20–19	105,213	
September 10	11:00 a.m.	South Carolina	No. 16 Arkansas	Donald W. Reynolds Razorback Stadium • Fayetteville, AR	ESPN	ARK 44–30	72,437	
September 10	11:00 a.m.	No. 23 Wake Forest	Vanderbilt	Firstbank Stadium • Nashville, TN	SECN	L 25–45	24,431	
September 10	2:30 p.m.	No. 24 Tennessee	No. 17 Pittsburgh	Heinz Field • Pittsburgh, PA	ABC	W 34–27 ^{OT}	59,785	
September 10	2:30 p.m.	Appalachian State	No. 6 Texas A&M	Kyle Field • College Station, TX	ESPN2	L 14–17	92,664	
September 10	3:00 p.m.	No. 25 (FCS) Samford	No. 2 Georgia	Sanford Stadium • Athens, GA	SECN	W 33–0	92,746	
September 10	6:00 p.m.	No. 20 Kentucky	No. 12 Florida	Ben Hill Griffin Stadium • Gainesville, FL	ESPN	UK 26–16	88,548	
September 10	6:00 p.m.	Central Arkansas	No. 22 Ole Miss	Vaught-Hemingway Stadium • Oxford, MS	SECN+/ESPN+	W 59–3	58,373	
September 10	6:30 p.m.	San Jose State	Auburn	Jordan-Hare Stadium • Auburn, AL	ESPNU	W 24–16	83,340	
September 10	6:30 p.m.	Southern	LSU	Tiger Stadium • Baton Rouge, LA	SECN	W 65–17	102,321	
September 10	10:00 p.m.	Mississippi State	Arizona	Arizona Stadium • Tucson, AZ	FS1	W 39–17	46,275	
^{#}Rankings from AP Poll released prior to game. All times are in Central Time.

=== Week Three ===
Date	Time	Visiting team	Home team	Site	TV	Result	Attendance	Ref.
September 17	11:00 a.m.	Youngstown State	No. 9 Kentucky	Kroger Field • Lexington, KY	SECN	W 31–0	59,308	
September 17	11:00 a.m.	Abilene Christian	Missouri	Faurot Field • Columbia, MO	SECN+/ESPN+	W 34–17	53,253	
September 17	11:00 a.m.	No. 1 Georgia	South Carolina	Williams-Brice Stadium • Columbia, SC (Georgia–South Carolina football rivalry)	ESPN	UGA 48–7	78,212	
September 17	2:30 p.m.	No. 22 Penn State	Auburn	Jordan-Hare Stadium • Auburn, AL	CBS	L 12–41	87,451	
September 17	2:30 p.m.	No. 20 Ole Miss	Georgia Tech	Bobby Dodd Stadium • Atlanta, GA	ABC	W 42–0	40,293	
September 17	2:30 p.m.	Vanderbilt	Northern Illinois	Huskie Stadium • DeKalb, IL	CBSSN	W 38–28	14,110	
September 17	3:00 p.m.	Louisiana–Monroe	No. 2 Alabama	Bryant-Denny Stadium • Tuscaloosa, AL	SECN	W 63–7	98,433	
September 17	5:00 p.m.	Mississippi State	LSU	Tiger Stadium • Baton Rouge, LA (LSU–Mississippi State football rivalry)	ESPN	LSU 31–16	98,250	
September 17	6:00 p.m.	Akron	No. 15 Tennessee	Neyland Stadium • Knoxville, TN	SECN+/ESPN+	W 63–6	101,915	
September 17	6:00 p.m.	Missouri State	No. 10 Arkansas	Donald W. Reynolds Razorback Stadium • Fayetteville, AR	SECN+/ESPN+	W 38–27	74,133	
September 17	6:30 p.m.	South Florida	No. 18 Florida	Ben Hill Griffin Stadium • Gainesville, FL	SECN	W 31–28	88,496	
September 17	8:00 p.m.	No. 13 Miami (FL)	No. 24 Texas A&M	Kyle Field • College Station, TX	ESPN	W 17–9	107,245	
^{#}Rankings from AP Poll released prior to game. All times are in Central Time.

=== Week Four ===
Date	Time	Visiting team	Home team	Site	TV	Result	Attendance	Ref.
September 24	11:00 a.m.	Bowling Green	Mississippi State	Davis Wade Stadium • Starkville, MS	SECN	W 45–14	48,376	
September 24	11:00 a.m.	Kent State	No. 1 Georgia	Sanford Stadium • Athens, GA	SECN+/ESPN+	W 39–22	92,746	
September 24	11:00 a.m.	Missouri	Auburn	Jordan-Hare Stadium • Auburn, AL	ESPN	AUB 17–14 ^{OT}	85,750	
September 24	2:30 p.m.	No. 20 Florida	No. 11 Tennessee	Neyland Stadium • Knoxville, TN (Florida–Tennessee football rivalry)	CBS	TENN 38–33	101,915	
September 24	3:00 p.m.	Tulsa	No. 16 Ole Miss	Vaught-Hemingway Stadium • Oxford, MS	SECN	W 35–27	60,641	
September 24	6:00 p.m.	No. 10 Arkansas	No. 23 Texas A&M	AT&T Stadium • Arlington, TX (Southwest Classic)	ESPN	TAMU 23–21	63,580	
September 24	6:00 p.m.	Northern Illinois	No. 8 Kentucky	Kroger Field • Lexington, KY	ESPN2	W 31–23	61,579	
September 24	6:30 p.m.	Vanderbilt	No. 2 Alabama	Bryant-Denny Stadium • Tuscaloosa, AL	SECN	ALA 55–3	96,246	
September 24	6:30 p.m.	New Mexico	LSU	Tiger Stadium • Baton Rouge, LA	SECN+/ESPN+	W 38–0	100,501	
September 24	6:30 p.m.	Charlotte	South Carolina	Williams-Brice Stadium • Columbia, SC	ESPNU	W 56–20	77,982	
^{#}Rankings from AP Poll released prior to game. All times are in Central Time.

=== Week Five ===
Date	Time	Visiting team	Home team	Site	TV	Result	Attendance	Ref.
September 29 (Note: The South Carolina game was moved up by two days due to Hurricane Ian.)	6:00 p.m.	South Carolina State	South Carolina	Williams-Brice Stadium • Columbia, SC	SECN	W 50–10	61,551	
October 1	11:00 a.m.	No. 7 Kentucky	No. 14 Ole Miss	Vaught-Hemingway Stadium • Oxford, MS	ESPN	MISS 22–19	64,828	
October 1	2:30 p.m.	No. 2 Alabama	No. 20 Arkansas	Donald W. Reynolds Razorback Stadium • Fayetteville, AR	CBS	ALA 49–26	75,579	
October 1	3:00 p.m.	No. 17 Texas A&M	Mississippi State	Davis Wade Stadium • Starkville, MS	SECN	MISS ST 42–24	51,930	
October 1	6:00 p.m.	LSU	Auburn	Jordan-Hare Stadium • Auburn, AL (Tiger Bowl)	ESPN	LSU 21–17	87,451	
October 1	6:30 p.m.	No. 1 Georgia	Missouri	Faurot Field • Columbia, MO	SECN	UGA 26–22	58,165	
October 2 (Note: The Florida game was moved back by one day due to Hurricane Ian.)	11:00 a.m.	No. 20 (FCS) Eastern Washington	Florida	Ben Hill Griffin Stadium • Gainesville, FL	SECN+/ESPN+	W 52–17	72,462	
^{#}Rankings from AP Poll released prior to game. All times are in Central Time.

=== Week Six ===
Date	Time	Visiting team	Home team	Site	TV	Result	Attendance	Ref.
October 8	11:00 a.m.	No. 8 Tennessee	No. 25 LSU	Tiger Stadium • Baton Rouge, LA	ESPN	TENN 40–13	102,321	
October 8	11:00 a.m.	Missouri	Florida	Ben Hill Griffin Stadium • Gainesville, FL	ESPNU	FLA 24–17	88,471	
October 8	11:00 a.m.	Arkansas	No. 23 Mississippi State	Davis Wade Stadium • Starkville, MS	SECN	MISS ST 40–17	57,849	
October 8	2:30 p.m.	Auburn	No. 2 Georgia	Sanford Stadium • Athens, GA (Deep South's Oldest Rivalry)	CBS	UGA 42–10	92,746	
October 8	3:00 p.m.	No. 9 Ole Miss	Vanderbilt	Firstbank Stadium • Nashville, TN (Ole Miss–Vanderbilt football rivalry)	SECN	MISS 52–28	31,567	
October 8	6:30 p.m.	South Carolina	No. 13 Kentucky	Kroger Field • Lexington, KY	SECN	SCAR 24–14	61,612	
October 8	7:00 p.m.	Texas A&M	No. 1 Alabama	Bryant-Denny Stadium • Tuscaloosa, AL	CBS	ALA 24–20	100,077	
^{#}Rankings from AP Poll released prior to game. All times are in Central Time.

=== Week Seven ===
Date	Time	Visiting team	Home team	Site	TV	Result	Attendance	Ref.
October 15	11:00 a.m.	Auburn	No. 9 Ole Miss	Vaught-Hemingway Stadium • Oxford, MS (Auburn–Ole Miss football rivalry)	ESPN	MISS 48–34	65,243	
October 15	2:30 p.m.	Arkansas	BYU	LaVell Edwards Stadium • Provo, UT	ESPN	W 52–35	63,471	
October 15	2:30 p.m.	Vanderbilt	No. 1 Georgia	Sanford Stadium • Athens, GA (Georgia–Vanderbilt football rivalry)	SECN	UGA 55–0	92,746	
October 15	2:30 p.m.	No. 3 Alabama	No. 6 Tennessee	Neyland Stadium • Knoxville, TN (Third Saturday in October)	CBS	TENN 52–49	101,915	
October 15	6:00 p.m.	LSU	Florida	Ben Hill Griffin Stadium • Gainesville, FL (Florida–LSU football rivalry)	ESPN	LSU 45–35	90,585	
October 15	6:30 p.m.	No. 16 Mississippi State	No. 22 Kentucky	Kroger Field • Lexington, KY	SECN	UK 27–17	61,451	
^{#}Rankings from AP Poll released prior to game. All times are in Central Time.

=== Week Eight ===
Date	Time	Visiting team	Home team	Site	TV	Result	Attendance	Ref.
October 22	11:00 a.m.	No. 18 (FCS) UT Martin	No. 3 Tennessee	Neyland Stadium • Knoxville, TN	SECN	W 65–24	101,915	
October 22	2:30 p.m.	No. 7 Ole Miss	LSU	Tiger Stadium • Baton Rouge, LA (Magnolia Bowl)	CBS	LSU 45–20	100,821	
October 22	3:00 p.m.	Vanderbilt	Missouri	Faurot Field • Columbia, MO	SECN	MIZZOU 17–14	60,618	
October 22	6:00 p.m.	No. 24 Mississippi State	No. 6 Alabama	Bryant-Denny Stadium • Tuscaloosa, AL (Battle for Highway 82)	ESPN	ALA 30–6	100,077	
October 22	6:30 p.m.	Texas A&M	South Carolina	Williams-Brice Stadium • Columbia, SC	SECN	SCAR 30–24	77,837	
^{#}Rankings from AP Poll released prior to game. All times are in Central Time.

=== Week Nine ===
Date	Time	Visiting team	Home team	Site	TV	Result	Attendance	Ref.
October 29	11:00 a.m.	Arkansas	Auburn	Jordan-Hare Stadium • Auburn, AL	SECN	ARK 41–27	83,792	
October 29	2:30 p.m.	Florida	No. 1 Georgia	TIAA Bank Field • Jacksonville, FL (World's Largest Outdoor Cocktail Party)	CBS	UGA 42–20	75,868	
October 29	3:00 p.m.	Missouri	No. 25 South Carolina	Williams-Brice Stadium • Columbia, SC (Mayor's Cup)	SECN	MIZZOU 23–10	77,578	
October 29	6:00 p.m.	No. 19 Kentucky	No. 3 Tennessee	Neyland Stadium • Knoxville, TN (Kentucky–Tennessee rivalry)	ESPN	TENN 44–6	101,915	
October 29	6:30 p.m.	No. 15 Ole Miss	Texas A&M	Kyle Field • College Station, TX	SECN	MISS 31–28	101,084	
^{#}Rankings from AP Poll released prior to game. All times are in Central Time.

=== Week Ten ===
Date	Time	Visiting team	Home team	Site	TV	Result	Attendance	Ref.
November 5	11:00 a.m.	Kentucky	Missouri	Faurot Field • Columbia, MO	SECN	UK 21–17	61,047	
November 5	11:00 a.m.	Florida	Texas A&M	Kyle Field • College Station, TX	ESPN	FLA 41–24	97,797	
November 5	2:30 p.m.	No. 1 Tennessee	No. 3 Georgia	Sanford Stadium • Athens, GA (Georgia–Tennessee football rivalry)	CBS	UGA 27–13	92,746	
November 5	3:00 p.m.	Liberty	Arkansas	Donald W. Reynolds Razorback Stadium • Fayetteville, AR	SECN	L 19–21	70,072	
November 5	6:00 p.m.	No. 6 Alabama	No. 10 LSU	Tiger Stadium • Baton Rouge, LA (First Saturday in November)	ESPN	LSU 32–31 ^{OT}	102,321	
November 5	6:30 p.m.	Auburn	Mississippi State	Davis Wade Stadium • Starkville, MS	ESPN2	MISS ST 39–33 ^{OT}	57,769	
November 5	6:30 p.m.	South Carolina	Vanderbilt	Vanderbilt Stadium • FirstBank, TN	SECN	SCAR 38–27	28,553	
^{#}Rankings from College Football Playoff. All times are in Central Time.

=== Week Eleven ===
Date	Time	Visiting team	Home team	Site	TV	Result	Attendance	Ref.
November 12	11:00 a.m.	Missouri	No. 5 Tennessee	Neyland Stadium • Knoxville, TN	CBS	TENN 65–24	101,915	
November 12	11:00 a.m.	No. 7 LSU	Arkansas	Donald W. Reynolds Razorback Stadium • Fayetteville, AR (Battle for the Golden Boot)	ESPN	LSU 13–10	73,750	
November 12	11:00 a.m.	Vanderbilt	No. 24 Kentucky	Kroger Field • Lexington, KY (Kentucky–Vanderbilt football rivalry)	SECN	VANDY 24–21	57,474	
November 12	2:30 p.m.	No. 9 Alabama	No. 11 Ole Miss	Vaught-Hemingway Stadium • Oxford, MS (Alabama–Ole Miss football rivalry)	CBS	ALA 30–24	65,923	
November 12	3:00 p.m.	South Carolina	Florida	Ben Hill Griffin Stadium • Gainesville, FL	SECN	FLA 38–6	89,454	
November 12	6:00 p.m.	No. 1 Georgia	Mississippi State	Davis Wade Stadium • Starkville, MS	ESPN	UGA 45–19	60,352	
November 12	6:30 p.m.	Texas A&M	Auburn	Jordan-Hare Stadium • Auburn, AL	SECN	AUB 13–10	87,451	
^{#}Rankings from College Football Playoff. All times are in Central Time.

=== Week Twelve ===
Date	Time	Visiting team	Home team	Site	TV	Result	Attendance	Ref.
November 19	11:00 a.m.	Florida	Vanderbilt	FirstBank Stadium • Nashville, TN	SECN	VANDY 31–24	30,136	
November 19	11:00 a.m.	Austin Peay	No. 8 Alabama	Bryant-Denny Stadium • Tuscaloosa, AL	SECN+/ESPN+	W 34–0	99,639	
November 19	11:00 a.m.	East Tennessee State	Mississippi State	Davis Wade Stadium • Starkville, MS	SECN+/ESPN+	W 56–7	49,117	
November 19	11:00 a.m.	UMass	Texas A&M	Kyle Field • College Station, TX	SECN+/ESPN+	W 20–3	90,177	
November 19	2:30 p.m.	No. 1 Georgia	Kentucky	Kroger Field • Lexington, KY	CBS	UGA 16–6	61,022	
November 19	3:00 p.m.	Western Kentucky	Auburn	Jordan-Hare Stadium • Auburn, AL	SECN	W 41–17	81,824	
November 19	6:00 p.m.	No. 5 Tennessee	South Carolina	Williams-Brice Stadium • Columbia, SC	ESPN	SCAR 63–38	79,041	
November 19	6:30 p.m.	No. 14 Ole Miss	Arkansas	Donald W. Reynolds Razorback Stadium • Fayetteville, AR (Arkansas–Ole Miss football rivalry)	SECN	ARK 42–27	71,365	
November 19	6:30 p.m.	New Mexico State	Missouri	Faurot Field • Columbia, MO	ESPNU	W 45–14	45,231	
November 19	8:00 p.m.	UAB	No. 6 LSU	Tiger Stadium • Baton Rouge, LA	ESPN2	W 41–10	97,367	
^{#}Rankings from College Football Playoff. All times are in Central Time.

=== Week Thirteen ===
Date	Time	Visiting team	Home team	Site	TV	Result	Attendance	Ref.
November 24	6:00 p.m.	Mississippi State	No. 20 Ole Miss	Vaught-Hemingway Stadium • Oxford, MS (Egg Bowl)	ESPN	MISS ST 24–22	62,487	
November 25	2:30 p.m.	Arkansas	Missouri	Faurot Field • Columbia, MO (Battle Line Rivalry)	CBS	MIZZOU 29–27	55,710	
November 25	6:30 p.m.	Florida	No. 16 Florida State	Doak Campbell Stadium • Tallahassee, FL (Sunshine Showdown)	ABC	L 38–45	79,560	
November 26	11:00 a.m.	South Carolina	No. 8 Clemson	Memorial Stadium • Clemson, SC (Palmetto Bowl)	ABC	W 31–30	81,500	
November 26	11:00 a.m.	Georgia Tech	No. 1 Georgia	Sanford Stadium • Athens, GA (Clean, Old-Fashioned Hate)	ESPN	W 37–14	92,746	
November 26	2:00 p.m.	No. 25 Louisville	Kentucky	Kroger Field • Lexington, KY (Governor's Cup)	SECN	W 26–13	58,727	
November 26	2:30 p.m.	Auburn	No. 7 Alabama	Bryant-Denny Stadium • Tuscaloosa, AL (Iron Bowl)	CBS	ALA 49–27	100,077	
November 26	6:00 p.m.	No. 5 LSU	Texas A&M	Kyle Field • College Station, TX (LSU–Texas A&M football rivalry)	ESPN	A&M 38-23	93,578	
November 26	6:30 p.m.	No. 10 Tennessee	Vanderbilt	FirstBank Stadium • Nashville, TN (Tennessee–Vanderbilt football rivalry)	SECN	TENN 56-0	40,350	
^{#}Rankings from College Football Playoff. All times are in Central Time.

=== Championship Game ===
Date	Time	Visiting team	Home team	Site	TV	Result	Attendance	Ref.
December 3	3:00 p.m.	No. 14 LSU	No. 1 Georgia	Mercedes-Benz Stadium • Atlanta, GA	CBS	UGA 50–30	74,810	
^{#}Rankings from College Football Playoff. All times are in Central Time.

== Postseason ==
=== Bowl games ===
For the 2020–2025 bowl cycle, The SEC will have annually eight appearances in the following bowls: Sugar Bowl and Peach Bowl (unless they are selected for playoffs filled by a Big 12 and at-large team if champion is in the playoffs), Citrus Bowl, Gator Bowl, Las Vegas Bowl, Liberty Bowl, Music City Bowl, ReliaQuest Bowl and Texas Bowl. The SEC teams will go to a New Year's Six bowl if a team finishes higher than the champions of Power Five conferences in the final College Football Playoff rankings. The SEC champion are also eligible for the College Football Playoff if they're among the top four teams in the final CFP ranking.

Legend
SEC win
SEC loss

Bowl Game	Date	Site	Television	Time (CST)	SEC team	Opponent	Score	Attendance
Las Vegas Bowl	December 17, 2022	Allegiant Stadium • Las Vegas, NV	ESPN	6:30 p.m.	Florida	No. 14 Oregon State	L 3–30	29,750
Gasparilla Bowl	December 23, 2022	Raymond James Stadium • Tampa, FL	ESPN	5:30 p.m.	Missouri	Wake Forest	L 17–27	34,370
Liberty Bowl	December 28, 2022	Simmons Bank Liberty Stadium • Memphis, TN	ESPN	4:30 p.m.	Arkansas	Kansas	W 55–53 ^{3OT}	52,847
Texas Bowl	December 28, 2022	NRG Stadium • Houston, TX	ESPN	8:00 p.m.	Ole Miss	Texas Tech	L 25–42	53,251
Gator Bowl	December 30, 2022	TIAA Bank Field • Jacksonville, FL	ESPN	2:30 p.m.	No. 19 South Carolina	No. 21 Notre Dame	L 38–45	67,383
Music City Bowl	December 31, 2022	Nissan Stadium • Nashville, TN	ESPN	11:00 a.m.	Kentucky	Iowa	L 0–21	69,143
ReliaQuest Bowl	January 2, 2023	Raymond James Stadium • Tampa, FL	ESPN2	11:00 a.m.	No. 22 Mississippi State	Illinois	W 19–10	35,797
Citrus Bowl	January 2, 2023	Camping World Stadium • Orlando, FL	ABC	12:00 p.m.	No. 17 LSU	Purdue	W 63–7	42,791
New Year's Six Bowls
Orange Bowl	December 30, 2022	Hard Rock Stadium • Miami Gardens, FL	ESPN	7:00 p.m.	No. 6 Tennessee	No. 7 Clemson	W 31–14	63,912
Sugar Bowl	December 31, 2022	Caesars Superdome • New Orleans, LA	ESPN	11:00 a.m.	No. 5 Alabama	No. 9 Kansas State	W 45–20	60,437
College Football Playoff bowl games
Peach Bowl	December 31, 2022	Mercedes-Benz Stadium • Atlanta, GA	ESPN	7:00 p.m.	No. 1 Georgia	No. 4 Ohio State	W 42–41	79,330
CFP National Championship Game	January 9, 2023	SoFi Stadium • Inglewood, CA	ESPN	6:30 p.m.	No. 1 Georgia	No. 3 TCU	W 65–7	72,628

Rankings are from CFP Poll. All times Central Time Zone.

== Head to head matchups ==
2022 SEC Head to head
Team	Alabama	Arkansas	Auburn	Florida	Georgia	Kentucky	LSU	Missouri	Mississippi State	Ole Miss	South Carolina	Tennessee	Texas A&M	Vanderbilt
Alabama	—	0-1	0-1				1-0		0-1	0-1		1-0	0-1	0-1
Arkansas	1-0	—	0-1				1-0	1-0	1-0	0-1	0-1		1-0	
Auburn	1-0	1-0	—		1-0		1-0	0-1	1-0	1-0			0-1	
Florida				—	1-0	1-0	1-0	0-1			0-1	1-0	0-1	1-0
Georgia			0-1	0-1	—	0-1		0-1	0-1		0-1	0-1		0-1
Kentucky				0-1	1-0	—		0-1	0-1	1-0	1-0	1-0		1-0
LSU	0-1	0-1	0-1	0-1			—		0-1	0-1		1-0	1-0	
Missouri		0-1	1-0	1-0	1-0	1-0		—			0-1	1-0		0-1
Mississippi State	1-0	0-1	0-1		1-0	1-0	1-0		—	0-1			0-1	
Ole Miss	1-0	1-0	0-1			0-1	1-0		1-0	—			0-1	0-1
South Carolina		1-0		1-0	1-0	0-1		1-0			—	0-1	0-1	0-1
Tennessee	0-1			0-1	1-0	0-1	0-1	0-1			1-0	—		0-1
Texas A&M	1-0	0-1	1-0	1-0			0-1		1-0	1-0	1-0		—	
Vanderbilt	1-0			0-1	1-0	0-1		1-0		1-0	1-0	1-0		—

Updated with the results of all games through November 2022.

=== SEC vs Power Five matchups ===
The following games include SEC teams competing against Power Five conferences teams from the (ACC, Big Ten, Big 12, BYU/Notre Dame and Pac-12). All rankings are from the AP Poll at the time of the game.

Date	Conference	Visitor	Home	Site	Score
September 3	Pac-12	#7 Utah	Florida	Ben Hill Griffin Stadium • Gainesville, FL	29-26
September 3	Pac-12	#3 Georgia	#11 Oregon†	Mercedes-Benz Stadium • Atlanta, GA	49-3
September 4	ACC	Florida State	LSU†	Caesars Superdome • New Orleans, LA	24-23
September 10	ACC	#24 Tennessee	#17 Pittsburgh	Heinz Field • Pittsburgh, PA	34-27 OT
September 10	ACC	Wake Forest	Vanderbilt	Vanderbilt Stadium • Nashville, TN	25-45
September 10	Big 12	#1 Alabama	Texas	Darrell K Royal–Texas Memorial Stadium • Austin, TX	20-19
September 10	Big 12	Missouri	Kansas State	Bill Snyder Family Stadium • Manhattan, KS	12-40
September 10	Pac-12	Mississippi State	Arizona	Arizona Stadium • Tucson, AZ	39-17
September 17	Big Ten	#22 Penn State	Auburn	Jordan-Hare Stadium • Auburn, AL	12-41
September 17	ACC	#20 Ole Miss	Georgia Tech	Bobby Dodd Stadium • Atlanta, GA	42-0
September 17	ACC	#13 Miami (FL)	#24 Texas A&M	Kyle Field • College Station, TX	17-9
October 15	Independents	Arkansas	BYU	LaVell Edwards Stadium • Provo, UT	52–35
November 26	ACC	Florida	Florida State	Doak Campbell Stadium • Tallahassee, FL	TBD
November 26	ACC	Georgia Tech	Georgia	Sanford Stadium • Athens, GA	TBD
November 26	ACC	Louisville	Kentucky	Kroger Field • Lexington, KY	TBD
November 26	ACC	South Carolina	Clemson	Memorial Stadium • Clemson, SC	TBD

=== SEC vs Group of Five matchups ===
The following games include SEC teams competing against "Group of Five" teams from the American, C-USA, MAC, Mountain West and Sun Belt.

Date	Conference	Visitor	Home	Site	Score
August 27	Mountain West	Vanderbilt	Hawaii	Clarence T. C. Ching Athletics Complex • Honolulu, HI	63-10
September 1	MAC	Ball State	Tennessee	Neyland Stadium • Knoxville, TN	59-10
September 1	C-USA	Louisiana Tech	Missouri	Faurot Field • Columbia, MO	52-24
September 3	Mountain West	Utah State	#1 Alabama	Bryant-Denny Stadium • Tuscaloosa, AL	55-0
September 3	American	#23 Cincinnati	#19 Arkansas	Donald W. Reynolds Razorback Stadium • Fayetteville, AR	31-24
September 3	American	Memphis	Mississippi State	Davis Wade Stadium • Starkville, MS	49-23
September 3	Sun Belt	Troy	#21 Ole Miss	Vaught-Hemingway Stadium • Oxford, MS	28-10
September 3	MAC	Miami (OH)	#20 Kentucky	Kroger Field • Lexington, KY	37-13
September 3	Sun Belt	Georgia State	South Carolina	Williams-Brice Stadium • Columbia, SC	35-14
September 10	Mountain West	San Jose State	Auburn	Jordan-Hare Stadium • Auburn, AL	24-16
September 10	Sun Belt	Appalachian State	#6 Texas A&M	Kyle Field • College Station, TX	14-17
September 17	American	South Florida	Florida	Ben Hill Griffin Stadium • Gainesville, FL	31-28
September 17	MAC	Akron	#15 Tennessee	Neyland Stadium • Knoxville, TN	63-6
September 17	MAC	Vanderbilt	Northern Illinois	Huskie Stadium • DeKalb, IL	38-28
September 17	Sun Belt	Louisiana-Monroe	#2 Alabama	Bryant-Denny Stadium • Tuscaloosa, AL	63-7
September 24	American	Tulsa	#16 Ole Miss	Vaught-Hemingway Stadium • Oxford, MS	35-27
September 24	C-USA	Charlotte	South Carolina	Williams-Brice Stadium • Columbia, SC	56-20
September 24	MAC	Bowling Green	Mississippi State	Davis Wade Stadium • Starkville, MS	45-14
September 24	MAC	Kent State	#1 Georgia	Sanford Stadium • Athens, GA	39-22
September 24	MAC	Northern Illinois	#8 Kentucky	Kroger Field • Lexington, KY	31-21
September 24	Mountain West	New Mexico	LSU	Tiger Stadium • Baton Rouge, LA	38-0
November 19	C-USA	UAB	LSU	Tiger Stadium • Baton Rouge, LA	41-10
November 19	C-USA	Western Kentucky	Auburn	Jordan-Hare Stadium • Auburn, AL	41-17

=== SEC vs FBS independents matchups ===
The following games include SEC teams competing against FBS Independents, which includes Army, Liberty, New Mexico State, UConn and UMass.

Date	Visitor	Home	Site	Score
November 5	Liberty	Arkansas	Donald W. Reynolds Razorback Stadium • Fayetteville, AR	L 19-21
November 19	New Mexico State	Missouri	Faurot Field • Columbia, MO	W 45-14
November 19	UMass	Texas A&M	Kyle Field • College Station, TX	W 20-3

=== SEC vs FCS matchups ===
The Football Championship Subdivision comprises 13 conferences and two independent programs.

Date	Visitor	Home	Site	Score
September 3	Mercer	Auburn	Jordan-Hare Stadium • Auburn, AL	42-16
September 3	Sam Houston	#6 Texas A&M	Kyle Field • College Station, TX	31-0
September 3	Elon	Vanderbilt	Vanderbilt Stadium • Nashville, TN	42-31
September 10	Southern	LSU	Tiger Stadium • Baton Rouge, LA	65-17
September 10	Central Arkansas	#22 Ole Miss	Vaught-Hemingway Stadium • Oxford, MS	59-3
September 10	Samford	#2 Georgia	Sanford Stadium • Athens, GA	33-0
September 17	Missouri State	#10 Arkansas	Donald W. Reynolds Razorback Stadium • Fayetteville, AR	38-27
September 17	Youngstown State	#9 Kentucky	Kroger Field • Lexington, KY	31-0
September 17	Abilene Christian	Missouri	Faurot Field • Columbia, MO	34-17
October 1 ^{[a]}	Eastern Washington	Florida	Ben Hill Griffin Stadium • Gainesville, FL	52-17
October 1 ^{[b]}	South Carolina State	South Carolina	Williams-Brice Stadium • Columbia, SC	50-10
October 22	UT Martin	Tennessee	Neyland Stadium • Knoxville, TN	65-24
November 19	Austin Peay	#8 Alabama	Bryant Denny Stadium • Tuscaloosa, AL	34-0
November 19	ETSU	Mississippi State	Davis Wade Stadium • Starkville, MS	56-7

=== Notes ===
a. Date of game was moved from October 1 to October 2

b. Date of game moved from October 1 to September 29

Note:† Denotes Neutral Site Game

=== SEC Records against other conferences ===
2022–2023 records against non-conference foes:

Regular Season

Power Conferences 5	Record
ACC	3-2
Big 12	1-1
Big Ten	0-1
BYU/Notre Dame	1-0
Pac-12	3-0
Power 5 Total	8-4
Other FBS Conferences	Record
American	4-0
C–USA	2-0
Independents (Excluding BYU/Notre Dame)	2-1
MAC	7-0
Mountain West	4-0
Sun Belt	3-1
Other FBS Total	22-2
FCS Opponents	Record
Football Championship Subdivision	14-0
Total Non-Conference Record	42-6

== Awards and honors ==
=== Players of the week ===
Week	Offensive Player of the Week	Defensive Player of the Week	Special Teams Player of the Week	Offensive Line Player of the Week	Defensive Line Player of the Week	Freshman Player of the Week
Week 1 (Sep. 4)	Anthony Richardson, QB (Florida)	Christopher Smith II, S (Georgia) Bumper Pool, LB (Arkansas)	Barion Brown, WR/KR (Kentucky)	Darrian Dalcourt, C (Alabama) LaQuinston Sharp, OL (Mississippi State)	Brenton Cox Jr., DL (Florida) Jordan Domineck, DL (Arkansas)	Jayden McGowan, WR (Vanderbilt)
Week 2 (Sep. 12)	Hendon Hooker, QB (Tennessee)	Drew Sanders, LB (Arkansas) Jordan Wright, LB (Kentucky)	Will Reichard, PK (Alabama)	Ricky Stromberg, OL (Arkansas) LaQuinston Sharp (2), OL (Mississippi State)	Byron Young, DE (Tennessee)	Dane Key, WR (Kentucky)
Week 3 (Sept. 19)	Brock Bowers, TE (Georgia)	Jay Ward, S (LSU)	Nik Constantinou, PK (Texas A&M)	Nick Broeker, OL (Ole Miss)	BJ Ojulari, DL (LSU)	AJ Swann, QB (Vanderbilt)
Week 4 (Sept. 27)	Hendon Hooker (2), QB (Tennessee)	Antonio Johnson, DB (Texas A&M) Will Anderson Jr., LB (Alabama)	Jack Podlesny, PK (Georgia)	Javontez Spraggins, OL (Tennessee)	Derick Hall, DE (Auburn)	Barion Brown, WR (Kentucky) Quinshon Judkins, RB (Ole Miss)
Week 5 (Oct. 3)	Jahmyr Gibbs, RB (Alabama)	Emmanuel Forbes, DB (Mississippi State)	Jack Podlesny (2), PK (Georgia) Harrison Mevis, PK (Missouri)	Micah Pettus, OL (Ole Miss)	BJ Ojulari (2), DE (LSU)	Barion Brown (2), WR (Kentucky) Quinshon Judkins (2), RB (Ole Miss)
Week 6 (Oct. 10)	Will Rogers, QB (Mississippi State) Jonathan Mingo, WR (Ole Miss)	Jaydon Hill, CB (Florida)	Chase McGrath, PK (Tennessee)	Jovaughn Gwyn, OL (South Carolina)	Byron Young (2), DE (Tennessee)	Branson Robinson, RB (Georgia)
Week 7 (Oct. 17)	Jalin Hyatt, WR (Tennessee)	DeAndre Square, LB (Kentucky) Hudson Clark, S (Arkansas)	Chase McGrath (2), PK (Tennessee)	Will Campbell, OT (LSU) Darnell Wright, OT (Tennessee)	Jared Ivey, DE (Ole Miss)	Quinshon Judkins (3), RB (Ole Miss)
Week 8 (Oct. 24)	Jayden Daniels, QB (LSU)	Darius Rush, DB (South Carolina)	Xavier Legette, KR (South Carolina)	Jerome Carvin, OG (Tennessee)	Mekhi Wingo, DT (LSU)	Luther Burden III, WR (Missouri)
Week 9 (Oct. 31)	Brock Bowers (2), TE (Georgia) Raheim Sanders, RB (Arkansas)	Christopher Smith II (2), S (Georgia)	Reid Bauer, P (Arkansas)	Nick Broeker (2), OL (Ole Miss) Darnell Wright (2), OL (Tennessee)	Isaiah McGuire, DL (Missouri)	Quinshon Judkins (4), RB (Ole Miss)
Week 10 (Nov. 7)	Stetson Bennett, QB (Georgia) Jayden Daniels (2), QB (LSU)	Harold Perkins, LB (LSU)	Kai Kroeger, P (South Carolina) Lideatrick Griffin, KR (Mississippi State)	O'Cyrus Torrence, OG (Florida)	Jalen Carter, DL (Georgia)	Mason Taylor, TE (LSU) Malaki Starks, S (Georgia)
Week 11 (Nov. 14)	Hendon Hooker (3), QB (Tennessee) Mike Wright, QB (Vanderbilt)	Harold Perkins (2), LB (LSU)	Will Reichard (2), PK (Alabama)	Cooper Mays, C (Tennessee) O'Cyrus Torrence (2), OG (Florida)	Byron Young (3), DE (Tennessee) Colby Wooden, DL (Auburn)	Trevor Etienne, RB (Florida)
Week 12 (Nov. 22)	Spencer Rattler, QB (South Carolina) Raheim Sanders (2), RB (Arkansas)	Drew Sanders, LB (Arkansas)	Jack Podlesny (3), PK (Georgia) Wesley Schelling, LS (Vanderbilt)	Jaylen Nichols, LT (South Carolina) Ricky Stromberg (2), C (Arkansas)	Nazir Stackhouse, DL (Georgia)	Quinshon Judkins (5), RB (Ole Miss)
Week 13 (Nov. 28)	De'Von Achane, RB (Texas A&M)	Marcellas Dial, DB (South Carolina) Demani Richardson, DB (Texas A&M)	Kai Kroeger (2), P (South Carolina)	LaQuinston Sharp (3), C (Mississippi State)	Roman Harrison, DE (Tennessee) Deone Walker, DL (Kentucky)	Conner Weigman, QB (Texas A&M) Dylan Sampson, RB (Tennessee)

==== Totals per school ====
School	Total
Tennessee	16
Georgia	12
Arkansas	11
LSU	10
Ole Miss	10
South Carolina	8
Kentucky	7
Florida	6
Mississippi State	6
Alabama	5
Texas A&M	5
Vanderbilt	4
Missouri	3
Auburn	2

=== SEC individual awards ===
The following individuals received postseason honors as voted by the SEC Conference football coaches at the end of the season

Award	Player	School
Offensive Player of the Year	Hendon Hooker, QB	Tennessee
Defensive Player of the Year	Will Anderson Jr., LB	Alabama
Special Teams Player of the Year	Jack Podlesny, PK	Georgia
Freshman of the Year	Quinshon Judkins, RB	Ole Miss
Jacobs Blocking Trophy	Ricky Stromberg, OL	Arkansas
Scholar Athlete of the Year	Austin Williams, WR	Mississippi State
Coach of the Year	Kirby Smart	Georgia

=== All-conference teams ===
The following players earned All-SEC honors. Any teams showing (_) following their name are indicating the number of All-SEC Conference Honors awarded to that university for 1st team and 2nd team respectively.

First Team

Position	Player	Class	Team
First Team Offense
QB	Hendon Hooker		Tennessee
RB	Quinshon Judkins		Ole Miss
RB	De’Von Achane		Texas A&M
WR	Jalin Hyatt		Tennessee
WR	Antwane Wells Jr.		South Carolina
TE	Brock Bowers		Georgia
OL	O'Cyrus Torrence		Florida
OL	Warren McClendon		Georgia
OL	Darnell Wright		Tennessee
OL	Emil Ekiyor Jr.		Alabama
OL	Ricky Stromberg		Arkansas
First Team Defense
DL	Jalen Carter		Georgia
DL	Derick Hall		Auburn
DL	BJ Ojulari		LSU
DL	Byron Young		Tennessee
LB	Will Anderson Jr.		Alabama
LB	Drew Sanders		Arkansas
LB	Henry To'oTo'o		Alabama
DB	Emmanuel Forbes		Mississippi State
DB	Christopher Smith II		Georgia
DB	Kool-Aid McKinstry		Alabama
DB	Jordan Battle		Alabama
First Team Special Teams
PK	Jack Podlesny		Georgia
P	Kai Kroeger		South Carolina
RT	Tulu Griffin		Mississippi State
AP/ST	De’Von Achane		Texas A&M

Second Team

Position	Player	Class	Team
Second Team Offense
QB	Stetson Bennett		Georgia
RB	Raheim Sanders		Arkansas
RB	Jahmyr Gibbs		Alabama
WR	Ladd McConkey		Georgia
WR	Jonathan Mingo		Ole Miss
WR	Dominic Lovett		Missouri
TE	Darnell Washington		Georgia
OL	Nick Broeker		Ole Miss
OL	Javion Cohen		Alabama
OL	Tyler Steen		Alabama
OL	Jovaughn Gwyn		South Carolina
OL	Will Campbell		LSU
OL	Sedrick Van Pran-Granger		Georgia
Second Team Defense
DL	Isaiah McGuire		Missouri
DL	Mekhi Wingo		LSU
DL	Nazir Stackhouse		Georgia
DL	Tyrus Wheat		Mississippi State
LB	Harold Perkins		LSU
LB	Bumper Pool		Arkansas
LB	Nathaniel Watson		Mississippi State
DB	Antonio Johnson		Texas A&M
DB	Kelee Ringo		Georgia
DB	Keidron Smith		Kentucky
DB	Dwight McGlothern		Arkansas
Second Team Special Teams
PK	Will Reichard		Alabama
P	Nik Constantinou		Texas A&M
RT	Kool-Aid McKinstry		Alabama
AP/ST	Jahmyr Gibbs		Alabama

† Two-time first team selection

Honorable mentions

- Alabama:
- Arkansas:
- Auburn:
- Florida:
- Georgia:
- LSU:
- Mississippi State:
- Missouri:
- Ole Miss:
- South Carolina:
- Tennessee:
- Texas A&M:
- Vanderbilt:

=== All-Americans ===
Currently, the NCAA compiles consensus all-America teams in the sports of Division I-FBS football and Division I men's basketball using a point system computed from All-America teams named by coaches associations or media sources. The system consists of three points for a first-team honor, two points for second-team honor, and one point for third-team honor. Honorable mention and fourth team or lower recognitions are not accorded any points. College Football All-American consensus teams are compiled by position and the player accumulating the most points at each position is named first team consensus all-American. Currently, the NCAA recognizes All-Americans selected by the AP, AFCA, FWAA, TSN, and the WCFF to determine Consensus and Unanimous All-Americans. Any player named to the First Team by all five of the NCAA-recognized selectors is deemed a Unanimous All-American.

Position	Player	School	Selector	Unanimous	Consensus
First Team All-Americans
WR	Jalin Hyatt	Tennessee	(AFCA, AP, CBS, ESPN, FWAA, The Athletic, TSN, USAT, WCFF)	*	*
TE	Brock Bowers	Georgia	(AFCA, ESPN, FWAA, USAT)		
OG	O'Cyrus Torrence	Florida	(AFCA, AP, CBS, ESPN, The Athletic, TSN, USAT, WCFF)		*
DT	Jalen Carter	Georgia	(AFCA, AP, CBS, ESPN, FWAA, The Athletic, TSN, USAT, WCFF)	*	*
LB	Will Anderson Jr.	Alabama	(AFCA, AP, CBS, ESPN, FWAA, The Athletic, TSN, USAT, WCFF)	*	*
LB	Drew Sanders	Arkansas	(AP)		
LB	Jamon Dumas-Johnson	Georgia	(ESPN, TSN)		
S	Christopher Smith II	Georgia	(AFCA, AP, FWAA, TSN, USAT, WCFF)	*	*
CB	Emmanuel Forbes	Mississippi State	(AFCA, ESPN, FWAA, The Athletic, WCFF)		*
DB	Brian Branch	Alabama	(CBS, ESPN)		
P	Kai Kroeger	South Carolina	(ESPN, The Athletic)		
KR	Lideatrick Griffin	Mississippi State	(FWAA)		

Position	Player	School	Selector
Second Team All-Americans
QB	Bryce Young	Alabama	(USAT)
TE	Brock Bowers	Georgia	(AP, CBS, The Athletic, TSN, WCFF)
TE	Darnell Washington	Georgia	(The Athletic)
OG	O'Cyrus Torrence	Florida	(FWAA)
OL	Nick Broeker	Ole Miss	(FWAA, WCFF)
DL	Byron Young	Alabama	(AFCA)
LB	Drew Sanders	Arkansas	(AFCA, FWAA, TSN, USAT, WCFF)
LB	Jamon Dumas-Johnson	Georgia	(AFCA, AP, The Athletic)
LB	Harold Perkins	LSU	(The Athletic)
S	Jordan Battle	Alabama	(AFCA, TSN)
S	Christopher Smith II	Georgia	(CBS)
CB	Kool-Aid McKinstry	Alabama	(AFCA, CBS, TSN)
CB	Emmanuel Forbes	Mississippi State	(AP, CBS, TSN, USAT)
DB	Brian Branch	Alabama	(AP, The Athletic)
P	Kai Kroeger	South Carolina	(AFCA, WCFF)
KR	Lideatrick Griffin	Mississippi State	(CBS, TSN, WCFF)
PR/AP	Kool-Aid McKinstry	Alabama	(FWAA, The Athletic)
AP	Jahmyr Gibbs	Alabama	(USAT)

Position	Player	School	Selector
Third Team All-Americans
QB	Hendon Hooker	Tennessee	(AP)
DT	Mekhi Wingo	LSU	(AP)
S	Jordan Battle	Alabama	(AP)
CB	Kool-Aid McKinstry	Alabama	(AP)
AP	Jahmyr Gibbs	Alabama	(AP)

==== List of All American Teams ====
- American Football Coaches Association All-America Team
- Associated Press All-America Team
- CBS Sports All-America Team
- ESPN All-America Team
- Football Writers Association of America All-America Team
- The Athletic All-America Team
- Sporting News 2022 College Football All-America Team
- USA Today All-America Team
- Walter Camp Football Foundation All-America Team

=== All-Academic ===
First team

Pos.	Name	School	Yr.	GPA	Major
QB					
RB					
RB					
WR					
WR					
TE					
OL					
OL					
OL					
OL					
OL					
DL					
DL					
DL					
DL					
LB					
LB					
LB					
DB					
DB					
DB					
DB					
PK					
P					
ST					

Second team

Pos.	Name	School	Yr.	GPA	Major
QB					
RB					
RB					
WR					
WR					
TE					
OL					
OL					
OL					
OL					
OL					
DL					
DL					
DL					
DL					
LB					
LB					
LB					
DB					
DB					
DB					
DB					
PK					
P					
ST					

Honorable mentions

- Alabama:
- Arkansas:
- Auburn:
- Florida:
- Georgia:
- LSU:
- Mississippi State:
- Missouri:
- Ole Miss:
- South Carolina:
- Tennessee:
- Texas A&M:
- Vanderbilt:

=== National award winners ===
2022 College Football Award Winners

== Home game attendance ==
Team	Stadium	Capacity	Game 1	Game 2	Game 3	Game 4	Game 5	Game 6	Game 7	Game 8	Total	Average	% of Capacity
Alabama	Bryant–Denny Stadium	100,077	98,321	98,433	96,246	100,077	100,077	99,639	100,077	-	692,870	99,118	98.91%
Arkansas	Donald W. Reynolds Razorback Stadium	76,212	74,751	72,437	74,133	75,579	70,072	73,750	71,365	-	512,087	73,155	95.99%
Auburn	Jordan–Hare Stadium	87,451	84,562	83,340	87,451	85,750	87,451	83,792	87,451	81,824	681,621	85,203	97.43%
Florida	Ben Hill Griffin Stadium	88,548	90,799	89,993	88,496	72,462	88,471	90,585	89,454	-	610,260	87,180	98.46%
Georgia	Sanford Stadium	92,746	92,746	92,746	92,746	92,746	92,746	92,746	-	-	556,476	92,746	100%
Kentucky	Kroger Field	61,000	61,139	59,308	61,579	61,612	61,451	57,474	61,022	58,727	482,312	60,289	98.83%
LSU	Tiger Stadium	102,321	102,321	98,520	100,501	102,321	100,821	102,321	97,367	-	704,172	100,596	98.31%
Mississippi State	Davis Wade Stadium	60,311	54,360	48,376	51,930	57,849	57,769	60,352	49,117	-	379,753	54,250	89.95%
Missouri	Faurot Field	62,621	47,653	53,253	58,165	60,618	61,047	45,231	55,710	-	381,677	54,525	87.07%
Ole Miss	Vaught–Hemingway Stadium	64,038	60,533	58,373	60,641	64,828	65,243	65,923	62,487	-	438,038	62,575	97.72%
South Carolina	Williams–Brice Stadium	77,559	78,297	78,212	77,982	61,551	77,837	77,578	79,041	-	530,498	75,785	97.71%
Tennessee	Neyland Stadium	101,915	92,236	101,915	101,915	101,915	101,915	101,915	101,915	-	703,726	100,532	98.64%
Texas A&M	Kyle Field	102,733	97,946	92,664	107,245	101,084	97,797	90,177	93,578	-	680,491	97,213	94.63%
Vanderbilt	Vanderbilt Stadium	40,550	20,120	24,431	31,567	28,553	30,136	40,350	-	-	175,157	29,193	71.99%

== NFL draft ==
=== Total picks by school ===
Team	Round 1	Round 2	Round 3	Round 4	Round 5	Round 6	Round 7	Total
Alabama	3	1	4	–	1	1	–	10
Arkansas	–	–	2	–	–	–	–	2
Auburn	–	1	1	1	1	1	–	5
Florida	1	2	–	1	1	1	–	6
Georgia	3	–	1	2	3	–	1	10
Kentucky	–	1	–	–	–	1	1	3
LSU	–	1	–	2	1	2	–	6
Mississippi State	1	–	–	1	–	–	–	2
Missouri	–	–	–	1	–	–	–	1
Ole Miss	–	1	–	1	–	1	1	4
South Carolina	–	1	1	–	1	–	2	5
Tennessee	1	–	4	–	–	–	–	5
Texas A&M	–	–	1	–	1	–	1	3
Vanderbilt	–	–	–	–	–	–	–	0
Total	9	8	14	9	9	7	6	62

The Following list includes all SEC Players drafted in the 2023 NFL draft:

Player	Position	School	Draft Round	Round Pick	Overall Pick	Team
Bryce Young	QB	Alabama	1	1	1	Carolina Panthers
Will Anderson Jr.	LB	Alabama	1	3	3	Houston Texans
Anthony Richardson	QB	Florida	1	4	4	Indianapolis Colts
Jalen Carter	DT	Georgia	1	9	9	Philadelphia Eagles
Darnell Wright	OT	Tennessee	1	10	10	Chicago Bears
Jahmyr Gibbs	RB	Alabama	1	12	12	Detroit Lions
Broderick Jones	OT	Georgia	1	14	14	Pittsburgh Steelers
Emmanuel Forbes	CB	Mississippi State	1	16	16	Washington Commanders
Nolan Smith	LB	Georgia	1	30	30	Philadelphia Eagles
Will Levis	QB	Kentucky	2	2	33	Tennessee Titans
Derick Hall	LB	Auburn	2	6	37	Seattle Seahawks
Jonathan Mingo	WR	Ole Miss	2	8	39	Carolina Panthers
BJ Ojulari	LB	LSU	2	10	41	Arizona Cardinals
Brian Branch	S	Alabama	2	14	45	Detroit Lions
Cam Smith	CB	South Carolina	2	20	51	Miami Dolphins
Gervon Dexter	DT	Florida	2	22	53	Chicago Bears
O'Cyrus Torrence	OG	Florida	2	28	59	Buffalo Bills
Zacch Pickens	DT	South Carolina	3	1	64	Chicago Bears
Tyler Steen	OT	Alabama	3	2	65	Philadelphia Eagles
Drew Sanders	LB	Arkansas	3	4	67	Denver Broncos
Hendon Hooker	QB	Tennessee	3	5	68	Detroit Lions
Byron Young	DT	Alabama	3	7	70	Las Vegas Raiders
Jalin Hyatt	WR	Tennessee	3	10	73	New York Giants
Cedric Tillman	WR	Tennessee	3	11	74	Cleveland Browns
Byron Young	DE	Tennessee	3	14	77	Los Angeles Rams
De’Von Achane	RB	Texas A&M	3	21	84	Miami Dolphins
Cartavious Bigsby	RB	Auburn	3	25	88	Jacksonville Jaguars
Darnell Washington	TE	Georgia	3	30	93	Pittsburgh Steelers
Jordan Battle	S	Alabama	3	32	95	Cincinnati Bengals
Ricky Stromberg	C	Arkansas	3	34	97	Washington Commanders
Cameron Latu	TE	Alabama	3	38	101	San Francisco 49ers
Kelee Ringo	CB	Georgia	4	3	105	Philadelphia Eagles
Anthony Bradford	OG	LSU	4	6	108	Seattle Seahawks
Colby Wooden	DT	Auburn	4	14	116	Green Bay Packers
Ventrell Miller	LB	Florida	4	19	121	Jacksonville Jaguars
Cameron Young	DT	Mississippi State	4	21	123	Seattle Seahawks
Tavius Robinson	LB	Ole Miss	4	22	124	Baltimore Ravens
Isaiah McGuire	DE	Missouri	4	24	126	Cleveland Browns
Stetson Bennett	QB	Georgia	4	26	128	Los Angeles Rams
Jay Ward	S	LSU	4	32	134	Minnesota Vikings
Darius Rush	CB	South Carolina	5	3	138	Indianapolis Colts
Jaquelin Roy	DT	LSU	5	6	141	Minnesota Vikings
Justin Shorter	WR	Florida	5	15	150	Buffalo Bills
Antonio Johnson	S	Texas A&M	5	25	160	Jacksonville Jaguars
Henry To'oTo'o	LB	Alabama	5	32	167	Houston Texans
Owen Pappoe	LB	Auburn	5	33	168	Arizona Cardinals
Christopher Smith II	S	Georgia	5	35	170	Las Vegas Raiders
Robert Beal Jr.	LB	Georgia	5	38	173	San Francisco 49ers
Warren McClendon	OT	Georgia	5	39	174	Los Angeles Rams
Kayshon Boutte	WR	LSU	6	10	187	New England Patriots
Chris Rodriguez Jr.	RB	Kentucky	6	16	193	Washington Commanders
Amari Burney	LB	Florida	6	26	203	Las Vegas Raiders
Jarrick Bernard-Converse	CB	LSU	6	27	204	New York Jets
Anders Carlson	K	Auburn	6	30	207	Green Bay Packers
Zach Evans	RB	Ole Miss	6	38	215	Los Angeles Rams
Jaylon Jones	CB	Texas A&M	7	4	221	Indianapolis Colts
DeMarcco Hellams	S	Alabama	7	7	224	Atlanta Falcons
Jovaughn Gwyn	OG	South Carolina	7	8	225	Atlanta Falcons
Nick Broeker	OG	Ole Miss	7	13	230	Buffalo Bills
Carrington Valentine	CB	Kentucky	7	15	232	Green Bay Packers
Kenny McIntosh	RB	Georgia	7	20	237	Seattle Seahawks
Jalen Brooks	WR	South Carolina	7	27	244	Dallas Cowboys
