= Gervon Dexter =

American football player (born 2001)

No. 95 – Atlanta Falcons
- Position: Defensive tackle
- Roster status: Active

Personal information
- Born: October 5, 2001 (age 25); Lake Wales, Florida, U.S.
- Listed height: 6 ft 6 in (1.98 m)
- Listed weight: 326 lb (148 kg)

Career information
- High school: Lake Wales
- College: Florida (2020–2022)
- NFL draft: 2023: 2nd round, 53rd overall pick

Career history
- Chicago Bears (2023–2025); Atlanta Falcons (2026–present)

Career NFL statistics as of Week 10, 2026
- Total tackles: 143
- Sacks: 15.5
- Fumble recoveries: 5
- Pass deflections: 4
- Stats at Pro Football Reference

Gervon Dexter Sr. (born October 5, 2001) is an American professional football defensive tackle for the Atlanta Falcons of the National Football League (NFL). He played college football for the Florida Gators.

== Early life ==
Dexter attended Lake Wales High School in Lake Wales, Florida. He was selected to the 2020 Under Armour All-American Game. He committed to the University of Florida to play college football.

== College career ==
As a true freshman at Florida in 2020, Dexter played in all 12 games with two starts and had 20 tackles, 0.5 sacks and one interception. As a sophomore in 2021, he started nine of 13 games, recording 50 tackles and 2.5 sacks.

=== College statistics ===
Year	Team	GP	Tackles					Interceptions					Fumbles			
Year	Team	GP	Solo	Ast	Cmb	TfL	Sck	Int	Yds	Avg	TD	PD	FR	Yds	TD	FF
2020	Florida	12	4	15	19	1.5	0.0	1	4	4.0	0	1	0	0	0	0
2021	Florida	13	19	32	51	4.0	3.0	0	0	0.0	0	1	2	0	0	0
2022	Florida	13	23	32	55	4.0	2.0	1	0	0.0	0	2	0	0	0	0
Career		38	50	81	131	18.0	5.0	1	0	0.0	0	4	3	0	0	1

== Professional career ==
Pre-draft measurables
Height	Weight	Arm length	Hand span	Wingspan	40-yard dash	10-yard split	20-yard split	20-yard shuttle	Three-cone drill	Vertical jump	Broad jump	Bench press
6 ft 5 5/8 in (1.97 m)	310 lb (141 kg)	32 1/4 in (0.82 m)	9 1/2 in (0.24 m)	6 ft 8 7/8 in (2.05 m)	4.88 s	1.81 s	2.83 s	4.70 s	7.50 s	31.0 in (0.79 m)	9 ft 2 in (2.79 m)	22 reps
All values from NFL Combine/Pro Day

=== Chicago Bears ===
Dexter was selected by the Chicago Bears in the second round (53rd overall) in the 2023 NFL draft. The Bears previously acquired the second round selection from the Baltimore Ravens in a mid-season trade for Roquan Smith. He started in the regular season opener for the Bears. He appeared in all 17 regular season games in the 2023 season. He finished with 2.5 sacks, 20 total tackles (13 solo), and two passes defended.

Dexter was a full-time starter in 2024 and 2025, starting 32 games across two seasons, finishing second on the team in sacks both years.

=== Atlanta Falcons ===
On August 30, 2026, Dexter was traded to the Atlanta Falcons in exchange for Clark Phillips III and a 2027 fifth-round pick. A month later, the Falcons signed him to a four-year, $78 million contract extension with $46.5 million guaranteed.

== NFL career statistics ==
Legend
**Bold**	Career high

=== Regular season ===
Year	Team	Games		Tackles					Interceptions						Fumbles				
Year	Team	GP	GS	Cmb	Solo	Ast	Sck	TFL	Int	Yds	Avg	Lng	TD	PD	FF	Fum	FR	Yds	TD
2023	CHI	17	1	20	13	7	2.5	0	0	0	0.0	0	0	**2**	0	0	0	0	0
2024	CHI	15	15	**51**	**23**	**28**	5.0	4	0	0	0.0	0	0	1	0	0	**2**	0	0
2025	CHI	17	17	44	21	23	**6.0**	**6**	0	0	0.0	0	0	0	0	0	**2**	0	0
2026	ATL	10	7	28	13	15	2.0	4	0	0	0.0	0	0	1	0	0	1	0	0
Career		59	40	143	70	73	15.5	14	0	0	0.0	0	0	4	0	0	5	0	0

=== Postseason ===
Year	Team	Games		Tackles					Interceptions						Fumbles				
Year	Team	GP	GS	Cmb	Solo	Ast	Sck	TFL	Int	Yds	Avg	Lng	TD	PD	FF	Fum	FR	Yds	TD
2025	CHI	2	2	4	2	2	0.0	0	0	0	0.0	0	0	0	0	0	0	0	0
Career		2	2	4	2	2	0.0	0	0	0	0.0	0	0	0	0	0	0	0	0

== Personal life ==
While attending the University of Florida, Dexter signed a name, image, and likeness (NIL) deal with Big League Advance Fund (BLA) in 2022, which required him to pay BLA 15% of his pre-tax NFL earnings for the next 25 years in exchange for a one-time payment of $436,485. He later sued BLA in 2023, claiming the contract violated Florida's NIL law and the state's athlete agent statute.
