= Jaquelin Roy =

American football player (born 2000)

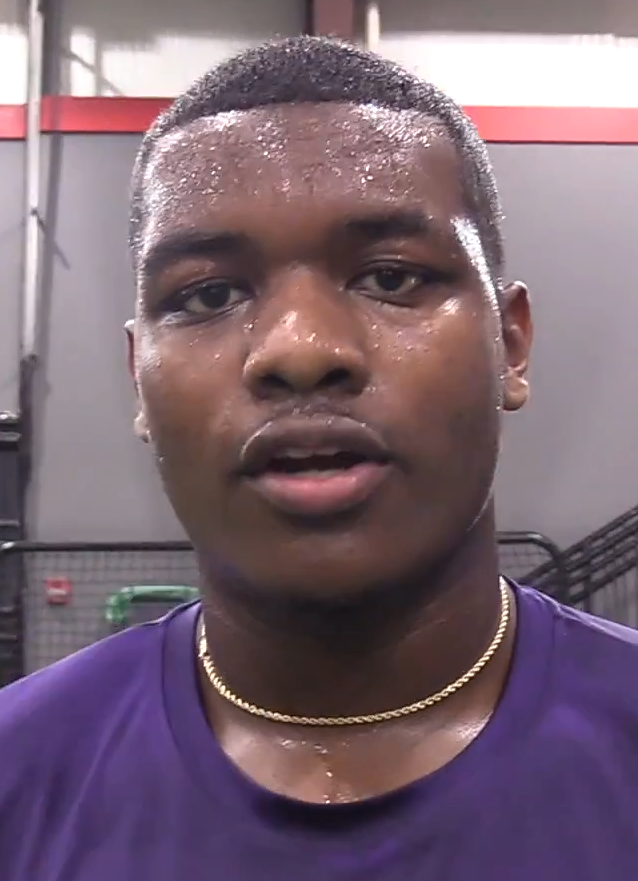
- Roy in 2019

Profile
- Position: Defensive tackle

Personal information
- Born: October 22, 2000 (age 26); Baton Rouge, Louisiana, U.S.
- Listed height: 6 ft 3 in (1.91 m)
- Listed weight: 305 lb (138 kg)

Career information
- High school: LSU Laboratory School (Baton Rouge)
- College: LSU (2020–2022)
- NFL draft: 2023: 5th round, 141st overall pick

Career history
- Minnesota Vikings (2023); New England Patriots (2024–2025)

Career NFL statistics as of 2024
- Total tackles: 25
- Sacks: 2.0
- Stats at Pro Football Reference

Jaquelin Roy (born October 22, 2000) is an American professional football defensive tackle. He played college football for the LSU Tigers and was selected by the Minnesota Vikings in the fifth round of the 2023 NFL draft.

== Early life ==
Roy grew up in Baton Rouge, Louisiana and attended Louisiana State University Laboratory School. He had 96 tackles, 17 tackles for loss, and nine sacks as a senior. Roy was rated a four-star recruit and committed to play college football at LSU. Roy later decommitted, citing that he initially made his decision too early during the recruiting process, but ultimately signed with LSU after considering offers from Alabama and Texas A&M.

== College career ==
Roy played in nine games as a freshman at LSU and had 18 tackles, four tackles for loss, and two sacks. He played in all 13 of the Tigers' games with one start during his sophomore season and recorded 30 tackles, six tackles for loss, and 1.5 sacks. Roy moved to nose tackle entering his junior season. He finished the season with 49 tackles, 3.5 tackles for loss, and 0.5 sacks. After the season, Roy declared for the 2023 NFL draft.

== Professional career ==
Pre-draft measurables
Height	Weight	Arm length	Hand span	Wingspan	40-yard dash	10-yard split	20-yard split	20-yard shuttle	Three-cone drill	Vertical jump	Broad jump	Bench press
6 ft 3 3/8 in (1.91 m)	305 lb (138 kg)	32 3/4 in (0.83 m)	10 1/8 in (0.26 m)	6 ft 6 1/8 in (1.98 m)	5.17 s	1.82 s	2.97 s	4.75 s	8.00 s	26.0 in (0.66 m)	8 ft 5 in (2.57 m)	30 reps
All values from NFL Combine/Pro Day

=== Minnesota Vikings ===
Roy was drafted by the Minnesota Vikings in the fifth round, 141st overall, of the 2023 NFL draft.

On August 27, 2024, Roy was waived by the Vikings.

=== New England Patriots ===
On September 10, 2024, Roy was signed to the New England Patriots' practice squad. On October 5, Roy was promoted to the active roster. The next day, he recorded his first career sack on Miami Dolphins quarterback Tyler Huntley.

On August 5, 2025, Roy was placed on injured reserve.
