= Isaiah McGuire =

American football player (born 2001)

No. 57 – Cleveland Browns
- Position: Defensive end
- Roster status: Active

Personal information
- Born: July 27, 2001 (age 25); Tulsa, Oklahoma, U.S.
- Listed height: 6 ft 4 in (1.93 m)
- Listed weight: 268 lb (122 kg)

Career information
- High school: Union (Tulsa)
- College: Missouri (2019–2022)
- NFL draft: 2023: 4th round, 126th overall pick

Career history
- Cleveland Browns (2023–present)

Awards and highlights
- First-team All-SEC (2022)

Career NFL statistics as of 2025
- Total tackles: 72
- Sacks: 5.5
- Forced fumbles: 4
- Tackles for loss: 18
- Stats at Pro Football Reference

Isaiah McGuire (born July 27, 2001) is an American professional football defensive end for the Cleveland Browns of the National Football League (NFL). He played college football for the Missouri Tigers.

== Early life ==
McGuire attended Union High School in Tulsa, Oklahoma. He committed to the University of Missouri to play college football.

== College career ==
As a true freshman at Missouri in 2019, McGuire played in six games and had four tackles. In five games in 2020, he had 18 tackles and three sacks. He started all 13 games his junior year in 2021, recording 55 tackles and six sacks. McGuire returned to Missouri his final year of eligibility in 2022. The senior appeared in 12 games, recording 39 tackles, 13 tackles for a loss, and 7.5 sacks.

== Professional career ==
Pre-draft measurables
Height	Weight	Arm length	Hand span	Wingspan	40-yard dash	10-yard split	20-yard split	Three-cone drill	Vertical jump	Broad jump
6 ft 4 3/8 in (1.94 m)	268 lb (122 kg)	33 7/8 in (0.86 m)	8 5/8 in (0.22 m)	6 ft 10 in (2.08 m)	4.76 s	1.72 s	2.75 s	7.39 s	36.5 in (0.93 m)	10 ft 2 in (3.10 m)
All values from NFL Combine

McGuire was selected by the Cleveland Browns in the fourth round, 126th overall, of the 2023 NFL draft. He appeared in four games and started one as a rookie. He finished with one sack, which came in Week 18 against the Cincinnati Bengals.

== NFL career statistics ==
Legend
**Bold**	Career high

=== Regular season ===
Year	Team	Games		Tackles					Interceptions						Fumbles				
Year	Team	GP	GS	Cmb	Solo	Ast	Sck	TFL	Int	Yds	Avg	Lng	TD	PD	FF	Fmb	FR	Yds	TD
2023	CLE	4	1	6	5	1	1.0	2	0	0	0.0	0	0	0	0	0	0	0	0
2024	CLE	16	3	**36**	**18**	**18**	**2.5**	**8**	0	0	0.0	0	0	0	**3**	0	0	0	0
2025	CLE	17	8	30	17	13	2.0	**8**	0	0	0.0	0	0	0	1	0	0	0	0
Career		37	12	72	40	32	5.5	18	0	0	0.0	0	0	0	4	0	0	0	0
