= Jovaughn Gwyn =

American football player (born 1999)

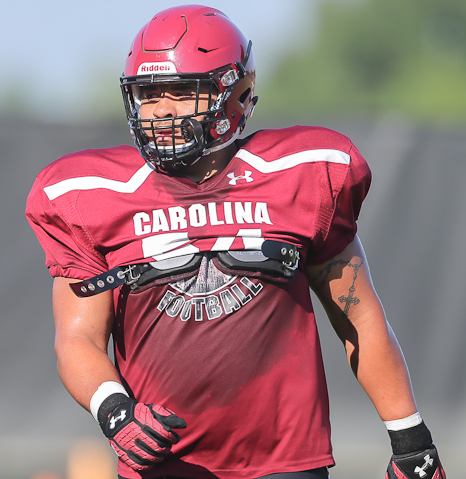
- Gwyn with the South Carolina Gamecocks in 2018

No. 54 – Baltimore Ravens
- Position: Center
- Roster status: Injured reserve

Personal information
- Born: March 18, 1999 (age 27); Boone, North Carolina, U.S.
- Listed height: 6 ft 2 in (1.88 m)
- Listed weight: 310 lb (141 kg)

Career information
- High school: Harding University (Charlotte)
- College: South Carolina (2018–2022)
- NFL draft: 2023: 7th round, 225th overall pick

Career history
- Atlanta Falcons (2023–2025); Baltimore Ravens (2026–present)

Awards and highlights
- Second-team All-SEC (2022)

Career NFL statistics as of 2025
- Games played: 22
- Games started: 3
- Stats at Pro Football Reference

Jovaughn Dakar Gwyn (born March 18, 1999) is an American professional football center for the Baltimore Ravens of the National Football League (NFL). He played college football for the South Carolina Gamecocks.

== College career ==
Gwyn was ranked as a four-star recruit by 247Sports.com coming out of Harding University High School in Charlotte, North Carolina.

He committed to South Carolina on December 20, 2017, over offers from NC State, Duke, and Appalachian State. He started 46 of 48 games at South Carolina.

== Professional career ==
Pre-draft measurables
Height	Weight	Arm length	Hand span	Wingspan	40-yard dash	10-yard split	20-yard split	20-yard shuttle	Three-cone drill	Vertical jump	Broad jump	Bench press
6 ft 1 7/8 in (1.88 m)	297 lb (135 kg)	31 3/4 in (0.81 m)	9 7/8 in (0.25 m)	6 ft 5 in (1.96 m)	5.12 s	1.80 s	2.91 s	4.80 s	7.87 s	27.5 in (0.70 m)	9 ft 1 in (2.77 m)	34 reps
All values from NFL Combine/Pro Day

=== Atlanta Falcons ===
Gwyn was selected by the Atlanta Falcons in the seventh round, 225th overall, of the 2023 NFL draft.

On November 28, 2024, Gwyn was waived by the Falcons, and was re-signed to the team's practice squad. He signed a reserve/future contract with Atlanta on January 6, 2025.

=== Baltimore Ravens ===
On March 12, 2026, Gwyn signed a one-year contract with the Baltimore Ravens.

On September 7, 2026, head coach Jesse Minter announced Gwyn as the starting center ahead of the team's Week 1 season opener against the Indianapolis Colts. He suffered an ankle injury in Week 3 and was placed on injured reserve on October 3, 2026.
