= BJ Ojulari =

American football player (born 2002)

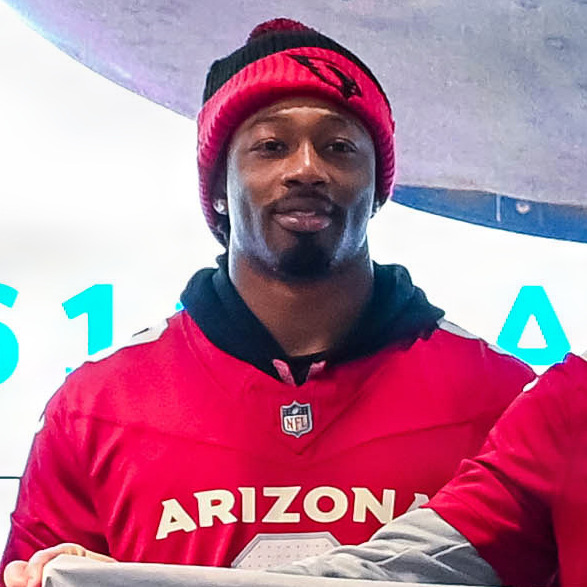
- Ojulari with the Arizona Cardinals in 2025

No. 56 – Jacksonville Jaguars
- Position: Outside linebacker
- Roster status: Practice squad

Personal information
- Born: April 5, 2002 (age 24); Marietta, Georgia, U.S.
- Listed height: 6 ft 2 in (1.88 m)
- Listed weight: 248 lb (112 kg)

Career information
- High school: Marietta
- College: LSU (2020–2022)
- NFL draft: 2023: 2nd round, 41st overall pick

Career history
- Arizona Cardinals (2023–2025); Jacksonville Jaguars (2026–present)*
- * Offseason or practice squad member only

Awards and highlights
- First-team All-SEC (2022)

Career NFL statistics as of 2025
- Total tackles: 49
- Sacks: 5
- Pass deflections: 1
- Stats at Pro Football Reference

Jamiu Bolaji "BJ" Ojulari (born April 5, 2002) is an American professional football outside linebacker for the Jacksonville Jaguars of the National Football League (NFL). He played college football for the LSU Tigers.

== Early life ==
Ojulari grew up in Marietta, Georgia, and attended Marietta High School. As a senior, he set a school record with 19 sacks and was named the Area Defensive Player of the Year with Marietta Daily Journal. Ojulari initially committed to play college football at Tennessee, but flipped his commitment to LSU during senior season.

== College career ==
Ojulari played in all ten of LSU's games as a freshman and finished the season with 16 tackles, four sacks, and five tackles for loss with a forced fumble and a fumble recovery and was named to the Southeastern Conference (SEC) All-Freshman team. He was named the SEC Defensive Lineman of the Week after sacking South Carolina quarterback Collin Hill three times for a loss of 21 yards. Ojulari was named the conference Defensive Lineman of the Week a second time after a 2½ sack performance in a 49-21 win over Central Michigan in the third week of his sophomore season.

== Professional career ==
Pre-draft measurables
Height	Weight	Arm length	Hand span	Wingspan	Three-cone drill	Vertical jump	Broad jump	Bench press
6 ft 2 3/8 in (1.89 m)	248 lb (112 kg)	34 1/4 in (0.87 m)	10 1/2 in (0.27 m)	6 ft 9 7/8 in (2.08 m)	7.57 s	33.5 in (0.85 m)	10 ft 6 in (3.20 m)	24 reps
All values from NFL Combine/Pro Day

=== Arizona Cardinals ===
Ojulari was selected by the Arizona Cardinals in the second round, 41st overall, of the 2023 NFL draft. As a rookie, he appeared in all 17 games in the 2023 season. He finished with four sacks, 40 total tackles (23 solo), and one pass defended.

On August 2, 2024, Ojulari suffered a torn ACL, ruling him out for the 2024 season.

Ojulari began the 2025 season on the reserve/PUP list while he recovered from his ACL injury. He was activated on November 15, 2025, ahead of the team's Week 11 matchup against the San Francisco 49ers.

On August 30, 2026, Ojulari was waived by the Cardinals.

=== Jacksonville Jaguars ===
On September 16, 2026, Ojulari signed with the Jacksonville Jaguars' practice squad.

== Personal life ==
Ojulari's parents immigrated to the United States from Nigeria and his maternal grandfather was the Yoruba artist Twins Seven Seven. His older brother, Azeez Ojulari, played college football for the Georgia Bulldogs before being drafted by the New York Giants in the second round of the 2021 NFL draft.
