= Nik Constantinou =

Australian-born gridiron football player (born 1999)

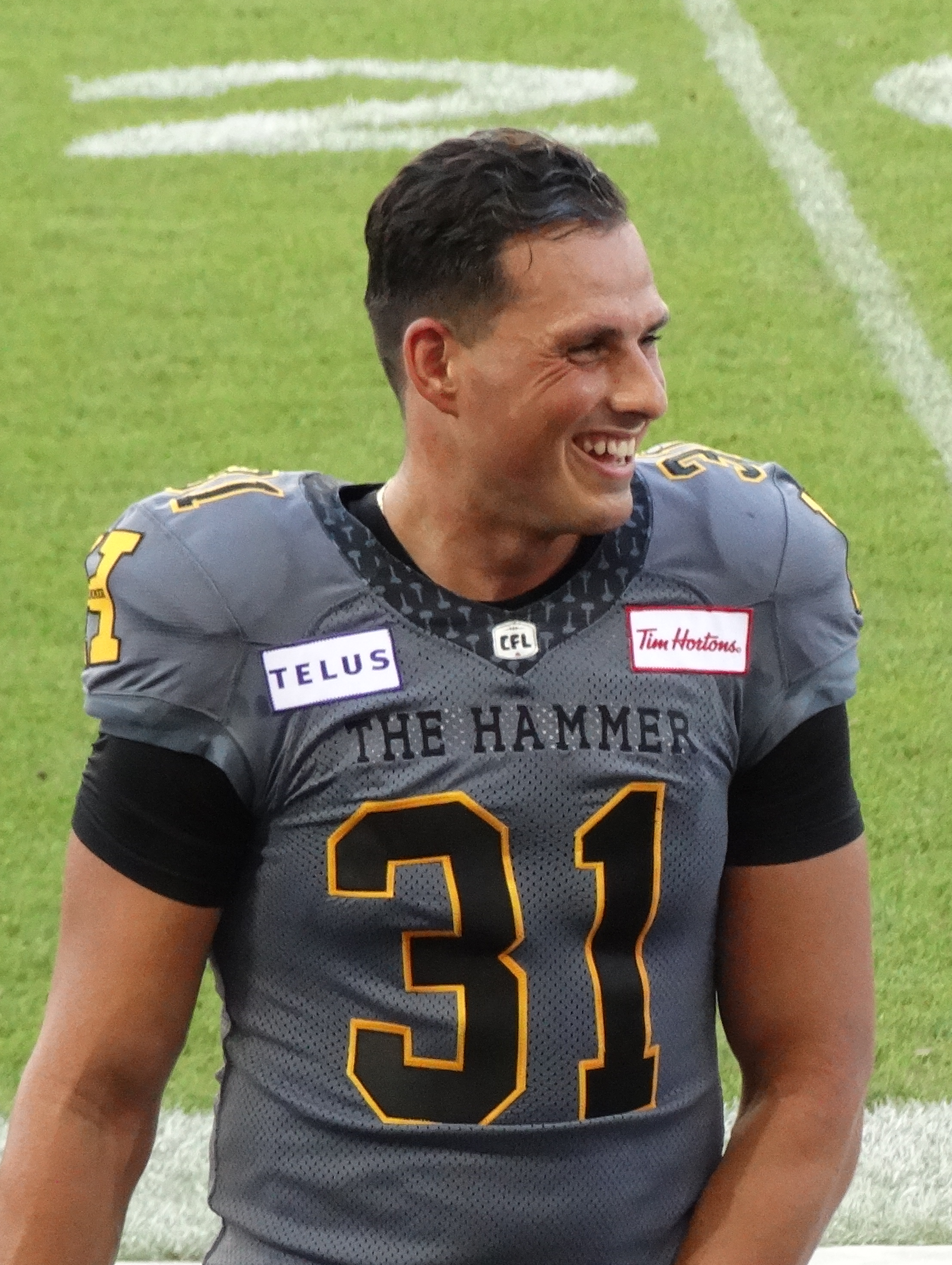
- Constantinou with the Hamilton Tiger-Cats in 2024

Hamilton Tiger-Cats
- Position: Punter
- CFL status: Global

Personal information
- Born: 17 December 1999 (age 26); Melbourne, Australia
- Listed height: 6 ft 3 in (1.91 m)
- Listed weight: 225 lb (102 kg)

Career information
- High school: Penleigh and Essendon Grammar School
- College: Texas A&M (2019–2023)
- NFL draft: 2024: undrafted
- CFL draft: 2024G: 1st round, 5th overall pick

Career history
- Denver Broncos (2024)*; Hamilton Tiger-Cats (2024–2025); Cleveland Browns (2026)*; Hamilton Tiger-Cats (2026–present)
- * Offseason or practice squad member only

Awards and highlights
- First-team All-SEC (2021); Second-team All-SEC (2022)
- Stats at Pro Football Reference
- Stats at CFL.ca

Nik Constantinou (born 17 December 1999) is an Australian professional gridiron football punter for the Hamilton Tiger-Cats of the Canadian Football League (CFL). He played college football at Texas A&M and was signed by the Denver Broncos as an undrafted free agent in 2024.

== Early life ==
Constantinou grew up in Melbourne, Australia. After playing at the PEGS Football Club, Constantinou decided to commit to play college football for the Texas A&M Aggies.

== College career ==
During Constantinou's freshman season in 2019 he played in one game where he punted once for 57 yards. In the 2020 season, Constantinou punted 36 times for 1,459 yards, with three being for 50 plus yards, and 13 that were downed inside the 20 yard line. In week three of the 2021 season, Constantinou punted four times for 182 yards, with all four punts being downed within the 20 yard line. During the 2021 season, Constantinou punted 51 times for 2,377 yards, with 19 traveling 50 yards or more, and 22 punts landing inside the 20 yard line. During the 2022 season, Constantinou would punt 61 times for an average of 41.7 yards per punt, en route to being named second team all-SEC. In the 2023 season, Constantinou punted 41 times for 1,693 yards with an average of 41.3 yards per punt.

== Professional career ==
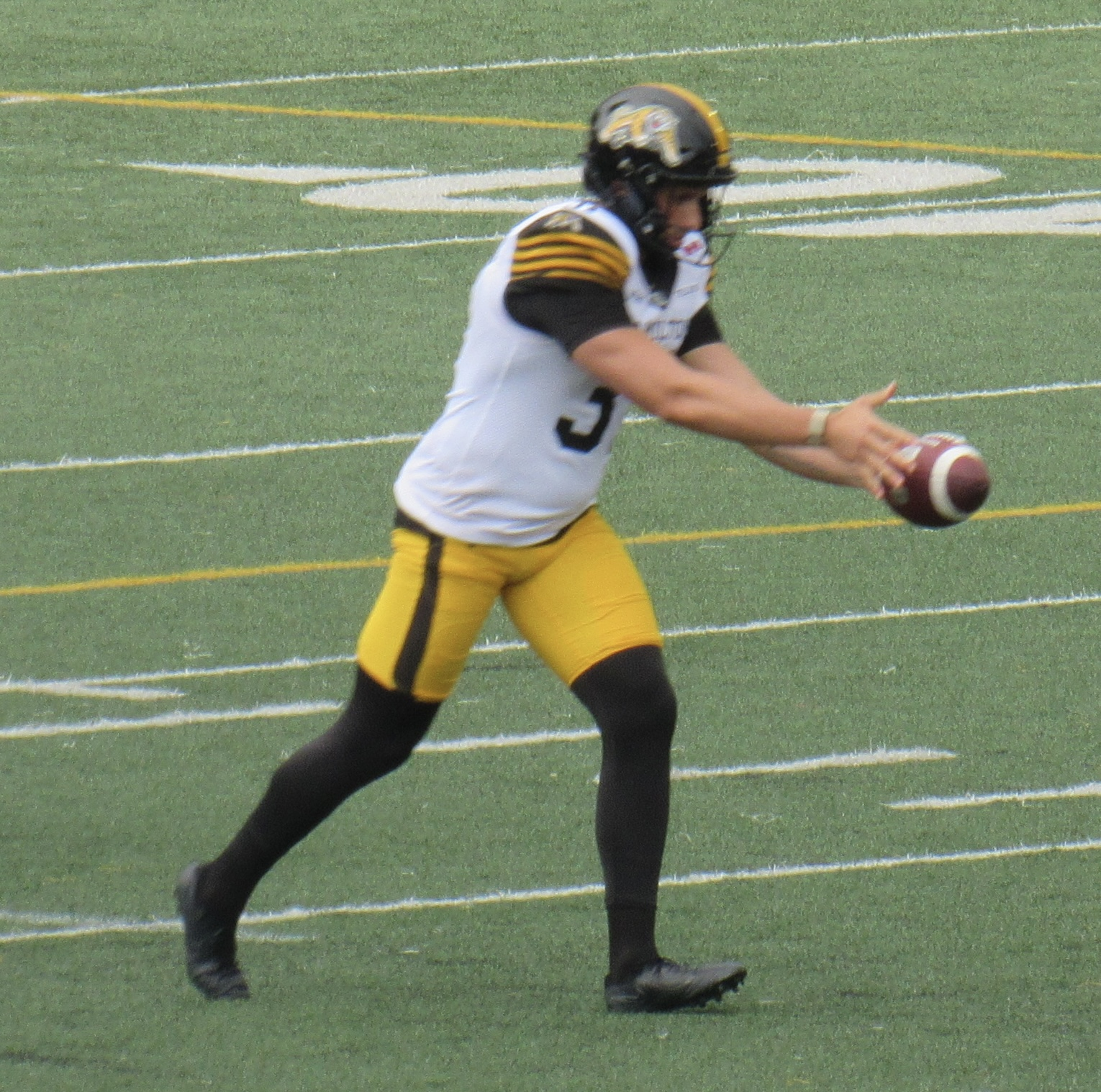
Constantinou punting for the Tiger-Cats in 2025

Pre-draft measurables
Height	Weight	Arm length	Hand span	Wingspan
6 ft 2 1/4 in (1.89 m)	223 lb (101 kg)	33 in (0.84 m)	9 3/4 in (0.25 m)	6 ft 6 in (1.98 m)
All values from Pro Day

=== Denver Broncos ===
After going unselected in the 2024 NFL draft, Constantinou signed with the Denver Broncos of the National Football League (NFL) as an undrafted free agent. He was waived on 13 May 2024.

=== Hamilton Tiger-Cats (first stint) ===
On 27 May 2024, it was announced that Constantinou had signed with the Hamilton Tiger-Cats. He played in 36 regular season games over two seasons where he punted 192 times with a 47.6-yard average and 11 singles. As a pending free agent, he was granted an early release on 8 January 2026, to pursue opportunities in the NFL.

=== Cleveland Browns ===
On 9 January 2026, Constantinou signed a reserve/futures contract with the Cleveland Browns. He was waived by the Browns on 28 August.

=== Hamilton Tiger-Cats (second stint) ===
On 14 September 2026, it was announced that Constantinou had signed again with the Hamilton Tiger-Cats.
