= Nick Broeker =

American football player (born 2000)

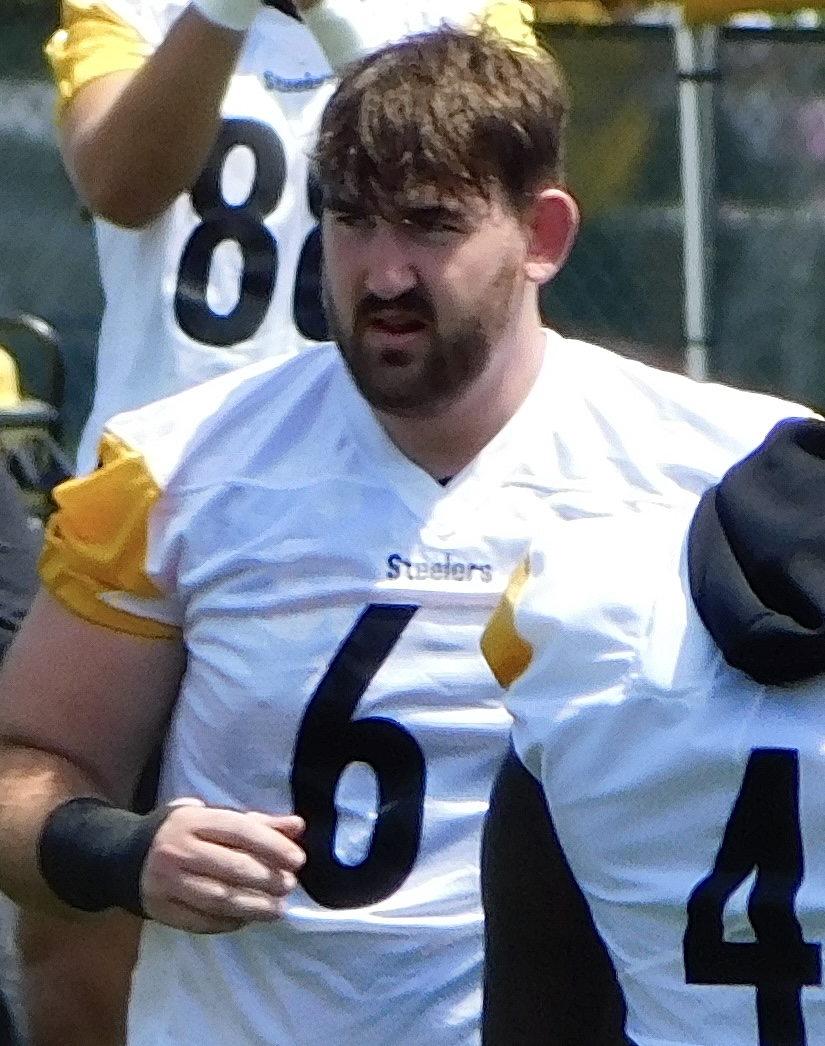
- Broeker with the Pittsburgh Steelers in 2025

Profile
- Position: Guard

Personal information
- Born: October 7, 2000 (age 26); Springfield, Illinois, U.S.
- Listed height: 6 ft 4 in (1.93 m)
- Listed weight: 305 lb (138 kg)

Career information
- High school: Sacred Heart-Griffin (Springfield)
- College: Ole Miss (2019–2022)
- NFL draft: 2023: 7th round, 230th overall pick

Career history
- Buffalo Bills (2023)*; Houston Texans (2023–2024); Pittsburgh Steelers (2025)*; Dallas Cowboys (2025)*; Buffalo Bills (2025)*; Kansas City Chiefs (2025)*; Buffalo Bills (2026)*; Tennessee Titans (2026)*; Buffalo Bills (2026)*
- * Offseason or practice squad member only

Awards and highlights
- Second-team All-SEC (2022)

Career NFL statistics as of 2026
- Games played: 12
- Stats at Pro Football Reference

Nicholas Michael Broeker (born October 7, 2000) is an American professional football guard. He played college football for the Ole Miss Rebels.

== Early life ==
Broeker attended Sacred Heart-Griffin High School in Springfield, Illinois. As a senior, he was The State Journal-Register's 2019 Male Athlete of the Year. He committed to the University of Mississippi to play college football.

== College career ==
Broeker played in all 12 games his true freshman year at Ole Miss in 2019. He started all 10 games at left tackle in 2020 and all 13 in 2021. As a senior in 2022, he switched from tackle to guard. That season, he was named the winner of the Kent Hull Trophy.

== Professional career ==
Pre-draft measurables
Height	Weight	Arm length	Hand span	Wingspan	40-yard dash	10-yard split	20-yard split	20-yard shuttle	Three-cone drill	Bench press
6 ft 4 3/8 in (1.94 m)	305 lb (138 kg)	32 1/2 in (0.83 m)	9 3/4 in (0.25 m)	6 ft 4 5/8 in (1.95 m)	5.27 s	1.84 s	2.96 s	4.70 s	7.75 s	23 reps
All values from NFL Combine/Pro Day

=== Buffalo Bills ===
Broeker was selected by the Buffalo Bills in the seventh round with the 230th overall pick in the 2023 NFL draft. Broeker played in the Bills first two preseason games, but not the third game against the Chicago Bears. Broeker did not make the 53 man roster and was waived on August 29, 2023.

=== Houston Texans ===
Broeker was claimed off waivers by the Houston Texans on August 30, 2023.

On May 9, 2025, Broeker was waived by the Texans.

=== Pittsburgh Steelers ===
On May 21, 2025, Broeker signed a one-year contract with the Pittsburgh Steelers. He was released by the Steelers on August 7.

=== Dallas Cowboys ===
On August 8, 2025, Broeker was claimed off waivers by the Dallas Cowboys. He was waived on August 25.

=== Buffalo Bills (second stint) ===
On September 22, 2025, Broeker was signed to the Buffalo Bills' practice squad. On December 9, he was released by the Bills.

=== Kansas City Chiefs ===
On December 16, 2025, Broeker was signed to the Kansas City Chiefs' practice squad.

=== Buffalo Bills (third stint) ===
On January 13, 2026, Broeker signed a reserve/futures contract with the Buffalo Bills. Broeker was waived by the Bills on August 30 as a part of final roster cuts; he was re-signed to the team's practice squad the following day. On September 14, Broeker was released by Buffalo.

=== Tennessee Titans ===
On September 29, 2026, Broeker signed with the Tennessee Titans practice squad. On October 6, he was released.

=== Buffalo Bills (fourth stint) ===
On November 11, 2026, Broeker signed with the Buffalo Bills practice squad. On November 17, he was released.
