= Antonio Johnson (defensive back) =

American football player (born 2001)

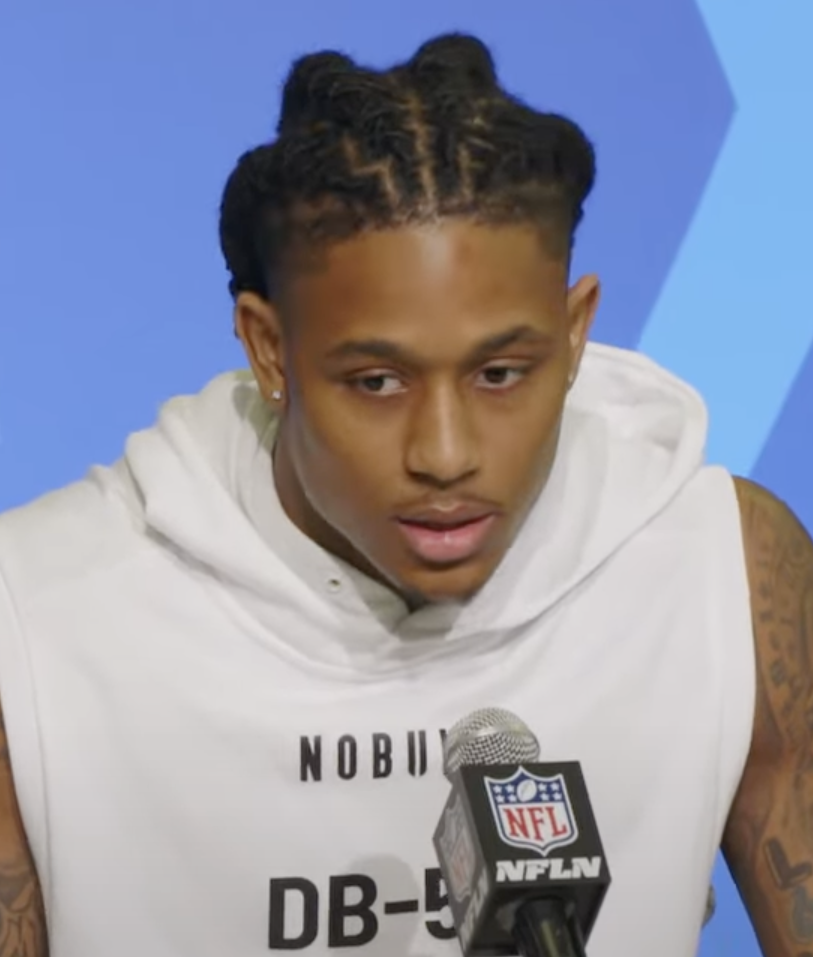
- Johnson at the 2023 NFL Combine

No. 6 – Jacksonville Jaguars
- Position: Safety
- Roster status: Active

Personal information
- Born: October 29, 2001 (age 25); East St Louis, Illinois, U.S.
- Listed height: 6 ft 2 in (1.88 m)
- Listed weight: 198 lb (90 kg)

Career information
- High school: East St. Louis Senior
- College: Texas A&M (2020–2022)
- NFL draft: 2023: 5th round, 160th overall pick

Career history
- Jacksonville Jaguars (2023–present)

Awards and highlights
- First-team All-SEC (2022); Second-team All-SEC (2021)

Career NFL statistics as of Week 7, 2026
- Total tackles: 178
- Sacks: 3.5
- Forced fumbles: 1
- Pass deflections: 15
- Interceptions: 7
- Defensive touchdowns: 1
- Stats at Pro Football Reference

Antonio Johnson (born October 29, 2001) is an American professional football safety for the Jacksonville Jaguars of the National Football League (NFL). He played college football for the Texas A&M Aggies.

== Early life ==
Johnson attended O’Fallon Township High School in O’Fallon, Illinois before transferring to East St. Louis Senior High School in East St. Louis, Illinois. He was selected to play in the 2020 All-American Bowl. A four-star prospect, he committed to play college football at Texas A&M University.

== College career ==
Johnson played in seven games and made one start as a true freshman at Texas A&M in 2020, recording 14 tackles. As a sophomore in 2021, he started all 12 games and had 79 tackles, an interception, and a sack and was named a member of the All-Southeastern Conference second team.

== Professional career ==
Pre-draft measurables
Height	Weight	Arm length	Hand span	Wingspan	40-yard dash	10-yard split	20-yard split	20-yard shuttle	Three-cone drill	Vertical jump	Broad jump	Bench press
6 ft 1 7/8 in (1.88 m)	198 lb (90 kg)	32 1/8 in (0.82 m)	9 3/4 in (0.25 m)	6 ft 5 7/8 in (1.98 m)	4.52 s	1.57 s	2.63 s	4.34 s	7.18 s	31.0 in (0.79 m)	9 ft 10 in (3.00 m)	8 reps
All values from NFL Combine/Pro Day

Johnson was selected by the Jacksonville Jaguars in the fifth round, 160th overall, of the 2023 NFL draft. As a rookie, he appeared in 13 games and started the last three games of the season.

In Week 18 of the 2025 season against the Tennessee Titans, Johnson recorded his first career touchdown on a pick-six against Cam Ward.

== NFL career statistics ==
Legend
**Bold**	Career high

=== Regular season ===
Year	Team	Games		Tackles					Interceptions						Fumbles				
Year	Team	GP	GS	Cmb	Solo	Ast	Sck	TFL	Int	Yds	Avg	Lng	TD	PD	FF	Fmb	FR	Yds	TD
2023	JAX	13	3	17	13	4	1.0	0	2	50	**25.0**	27	0	3	**1**	0	0	0	0
2024	JAX	17	8	**73**	**55**	18	0.0	1	0	0	0.0	0	0	2	0	0	0	0	0
2025	JAX	17	9	58	37	**21**	**2.0**	**2**	**5**	**107**	21.4	**58**	**1**	**9**	0	0	0	0	0
Career		47	20	148	105	43	3.0	3	7	157	22.4	58	1	14	1	0	0	0	0

=== Postseason ===
Year	Team	Games		Tackles					Interceptions						Fumbles				
Year	Team	GP	GS	Cmb	Solo	Ast	Sck	TFL	Int	Yds	Avg	Lng	TD	PD	FF	Fmb	FR	Yds	TD
2025	JAX	1	0	6	3	3	0.0	0	0	0	0.0	0	0	0	0	0	0	0	0
Career		1	0	6	3	3	0.0	0	0	0	0.0	0	0	0	0	0	0	0	0
