= Ricky Stromberg =

American football player (born 2000)

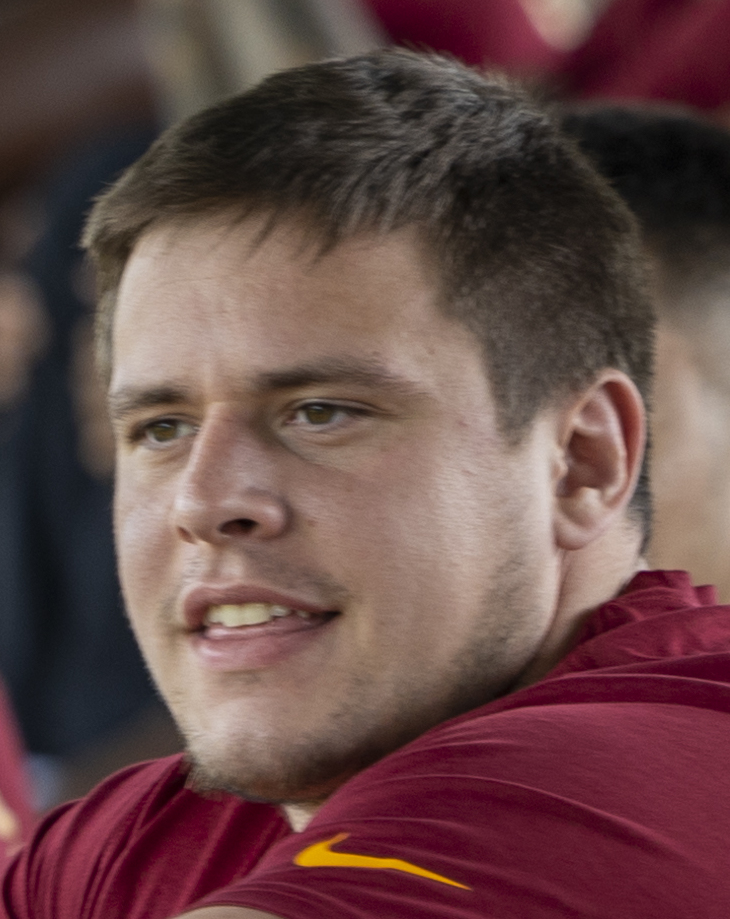
- Stromberg with the Washington Commanders in 2023

Profile
- Position: Center

Personal information
- Born: November 10, 2000 (age 25); Tulsa, Oklahoma, U.S.
- Listed height: 6 ft 3 in (1.91 m)
- Listed weight: 313 lb (142 kg)

Career information
- High school: Union (Tulsa)
- College: Arkansas (2019–2022)
- NFL draft: 2023: 3rd round, 97th overall pick

Career history
- Washington Commanders (2023); Chicago Bears (2024–2025)*
- * Offseason or practice squad member only

Awards and highlights
- Jacobs Blocking Trophy (2022); First-team All-SEC (2022); Second-team All-SEC (2021)

Career NFL statistics as of 2025
- Games played: 4
- Stats at Pro Football Reference

Richard Stromberg (born November 10, 2000) is an American professional football center. He played college football for the Arkansas Razorbacks, and was selected by the Washington Commanders in the third round of the 2023 NFL draft.

== Early life ==
Stromberg was born on November 10, 2000, in Tulsa, Oklahoma. He attended Union High School in Tulsa, where he played football as a two-way lineman. As a sophomore, he was a part of a team that posted an 11–2 record and won the state championship. As a junior, the team posted a 12–1 record before losing in the division championship.

Stromberg was named the Division 6AI-2 Offensive Lineman of the Year as a senior on a team that went 9–3. A four-star recruit, he was ranked the fifth-best center nationally and the fourth-best player overall from Oklahoma. Stromberg initially committed to play college football at Tulsa before switching to Arkansas.

== College career ==
Stromberg saw playing time as a freshman for the Arkansas Razorbacks, appearing in 12 games in 2019 while starting the last 11. He became the starting left guard in week two after an injury to Austin Capps; he switched to right guard after Capps returned to play and did not allow a single sack. In 2020, he appeared in nine games and started eight at center, allowing only one sack.

Stromberg was named a second-team selection on the 2021 All-Southeastern Conference (SEC) football team by the Associated Press after allowing only three sacks all season. He was also named to the 2022 All-SEC football team as a senior and was the recipient of the Jacobs Blocking Trophy, awarded to the best blocker in the SEC. Stromberg opted to leave for the NFL draft after the season and played in the 2023 East-West Shrine Bowl.

== Professional career ==
Pre-draft measurables
Height	Weight	Arm length	Hand span	40-yard dash	10-yard split	20-yard split	20-yard shuttle	Three-cone drill	Vertical jump	Broad jump
6 ft 3 1/4 in (1.91 m)	306 lb (139 kg)	33 1/4 in (0.84 m)	9 3/4 in (0.25 m)	5.26 s	1.81 s	2.94 s	4.58 s	7.50 s	32.5 in (0.83 m)	9 ft 3 in (2.82 m)

=== Washington Commanders ===
Stromberg was selected by the Washington Commanders in the third round (97th overall) of the 2023 NFL draft. He signed his four-year rookie contract on May 19, 2023. On November 7, he was placed on injured reserve with a knee injury.

On August 27, 2024, Stromberg was waived/injured, reverting to injured reserve before being released with an injury settlement a few days later.

=== Chicago Bears ===
On November 13, 2024, Stromberg was signed to the Chicago Bears' practice squad. He signed a reserve/future contract on January 6, 2025.

On August 26, 2025, Stromberg was waived by the Bears as part of final roster cuts and signed to the practice squad the following day.
