= Mekhi Wingo =

American football player (born 2003)

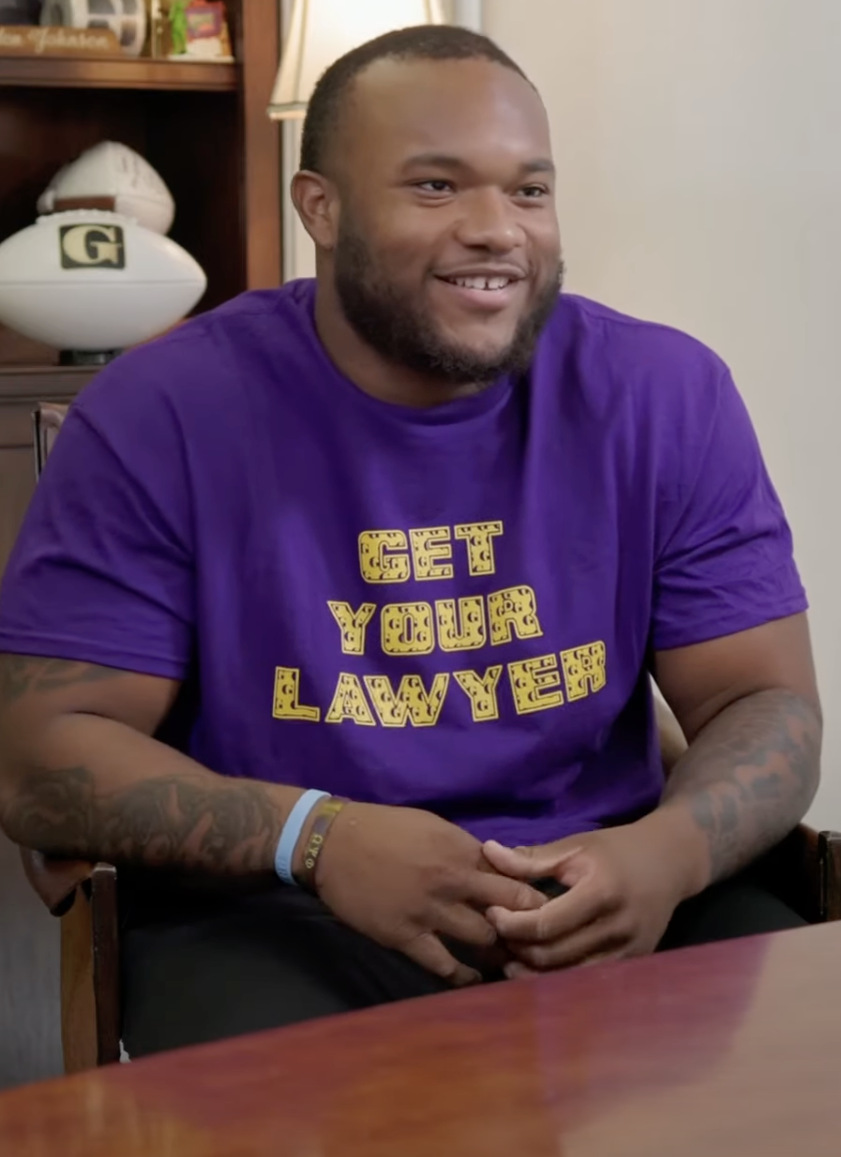
- Wingo in 2023

No. 94 – Detroit Lions
- Position: Defensive tackle
- Roster status: Active

Personal information
- Born: April 17, 2003 (age 23); St. Louis, Missouri, U.S.
- Listed height: 6 ft 0 in (1.83 m)
- Listed weight: 288 lb (131 kg)

Career information
- High school: De Smet Jesuit (Creve Coeur, Missouri)
- College: Missouri (2021); LSU (2022–2023)
- NFL draft: 2024: 6th round, 189th overall pick

Career history
- Detroit Lions (2024–present)

Awards and highlights
- Third-team All-American (2022); Second-team All-SEC (2022); SEC All-Freshman Team (2021)

Career NFL statistics as of 2025
- Total tackles: 12
- Stats at Pro Football Reference

Mekhi Wingo (born April 17, 2003) is an American professional football defensive tackle for the Detroit Lions of the National Football League (NFL). He played college football for the Missouri Tigers and the LSU Tigers. Wingo was selected by the Lions in the sixth round of the 2024 NFL draft.

== Early life ==
Wingo attended De Smet Jesuit High School in Creve Coeur, Missouri. As a senior, he was the Missouri Gatorade Football Player of the Year after recording 54 tackles and five sacks. He committed to the University of Missouri to play college football.

== College career ==
As a true freshman at Missouri in 2021, Wingo played in 11 games with three starts and had 27 tackles, one sack and one interception he returned for a touchdown. After the season, he transferred to Louisiana State University (LSU). As a sophomore, in his first year at LSU he started 12 of 13 games, recording 47 tackles and three sacks. He was a second team All-SEC selection and named a third-team All-American by the Associated Press in 2022.

As a junior he dealt with injuries missing five games, still totaling 25 tackles and 4.5 sacks in eight games. Following the season he declared for the 2024 NFL draft.

== Professional career ==
Pre-draft measurables
Height	Weight	Arm length	Hand span	Wingspan	40-yard dash	10-yard split	20-yard split	20-yard shuttle	Three-cone drill	Vertical jump	Broad jump	Bench press
6 ft 0 1/4 in (1.84 m)	284 lb (129 kg)	32 in (0.81 m)	9 1/4 in (0.23 m)	6 ft 5 7/8 in (1.98 m)	4.85 s	1.64 s	2.77 s	4.45 s	7.33 s	31.5 in (0.80 m)	9 ft 1 in (2.77 m)	28 reps
All values from NFL Combine/Pro Day

Wingo was drafted by the Detroit Lions in the sixth round (189th overall) of the 2024 NFL Draft.
