= 2023 Arkansas Razorbacks football team =

American college football season

2023 Arkansas Razorbacks football
- Conference: Southeastern Conference
- Western Division
- Record: 4–8 (1–7 SEC)
- Head coach: Sam Pittman (4th season)
- Offensive coordinator: Dan Enos (4th season; first 8 games); Kenny Guiton (interim; final 4 games)
- Offensive scheme: West Coast spread
- Defensive coordinator: Travis Williams (1st season)
- Co-defensive coordinator: Marcus Woodson (1st season)
- Base defense: Multiple 4–2–5
- Captains: Landon Jackson; Trajan Jeffcoat; KJ Jefferson; Brady Latham; Cam Little; Raheim Sanders
- Home stadium: Donald W. Reynolds Razorback Stadium; War Memorial Stadium

2023 Southeastern Conference football standings
	Conf.			Overall
Team	W		L	W		L
Eastern Division
No. 4 Georgia xy	8	–	0	13	–	1
No. 8 Missouri	6	–	2	11	–	2
No. 17 Tennessee	4	–	4	9	–	4
Kentucky	3	–	5	7	–	6
Florida	3	–	5	5	–	7
South Carolina	3	–	5	5	–	7
Vanderbilt	0	–	8	2	–	10
Western Division
No. 5 Alabama xy$^	8	–	0	12	–	2
No. 9 Ole Miss	6	–	2	11	–	2
No. 12 LSU	6	–	2	10	–	3
Texas A&M	4	–	4	7	–	6
Auburn	3	–	5	6	–	7
Mississippi State	1	–	7	5	–	7
Arkansas	1	–	7	4	–	8
Championship: Alabama 27, Georgia 24
^ – College Football Playoff participant; $ – Conference champion; x – Division champion/co-champions; y – Championship game participant; Rankings from AP Poll

The 2023 Arkansas Razorbacks football team represented the University of Arkansas as a member of the Southeastern Conference (SEC) during the 2023 NCAA Division I FBS football season. Led by fourth-year head coach Sam Pittman, the Razorbacks compiled an overall record of 4–8 with a mark of 1–7 in conference play, tying for sixth place at the bottom of the standings in the SEC's Western Division. The team played six home games at Donald W. Reynolds Razorback Stadium in Fayetteville, Arkansas and one home game at War Memorial Stadium in Little Rock, Arkansas.

== Schedule ==
Arkansas and the SEC announced the 2023 football schedule on September 20, 2022. The Razorbacks' schedule consisted of seven home games, four away games and one neutral site game for the regular season. The team's bye came during week 9, on October 28.

Date	Time	Opponent	Site	TV	Result	Attendance
September 2	12:00 p.m.	Western Carolina*	War Memorial Stadium; Little Rock, AR	SECN+, ESPN+	W 56–13	44,397
September 9	3:00 p.m.	Kent State*	Donald W. Reynolds Razorback Stadium; Fayetteville, AR	SECN	W 28–6	73,173
September 16	6:30 p.m.	BYU*	Donald W. Reynolds Razorback Stadium; Fayetteville, AR	ESPN2	L 31–38	74,821
September 23	6:00 p.m.	at No. 12 LSU	Tiger Stadium; Baton Rouge, LA (rivalry)	ESPN	L 31–34	99,648
September 30	11:00 a.m.	vs. Texas A&M	AT&T Stadium; Arlington, TX (rivalry)	SECN	L 22–34	59,437
October 7	6:30 p.m.	at No. 16 Ole Miss	Vaught–Hemingway Stadium; Oxford, MS (rivalry)	SECN	L 20–27	65,748
October 14	11:00 a.m.	at No. 11 Alabama	Bryant–Denny Stadium; Tuscaloosa, AL	ESPN	L 21–24	100,077
October 21	11:00 a.m.	Mississippi State^{†}	Donald W. Reynolds Razorback Stadium; Fayetteville, AR	ESPN	L 3–7	71,505
November 4	11:00 a.m.	at Florida	Ben Hill Griffin Stadium; Gainesville, FL	ESPN2	W 39–36 ^{OT}	89,872
November 11	3:00 p.m.	Auburn	Donald W. Reynolds Razorback Stadium; Fayetteville, AR	SECN	L 10–48	72,033
November 18	6:30 p.m.	FIU*	Donald W. Reynolds Razorback Stadium; Fayetteville, AR	ESPNU	W 44–20	61,442
November 24	3:00 p.m.	No. 9 Missouri	Donald W. Reynolds Razorback Stadium; Fayetteville, AR (Battle Line Rivalry)	CBS	L 14–48	59,847
*Non-conference game; ^{†}Homecoming; Rankings from AP Poll (and CFP Rankings, after November 1) – Released prior to game; All times are in Central time

== Game summaries ==
=== Western Carolina ===
Game One – Western Carolina Catamounts (0–0) at Arkansas Razorbacks (0–0)

Quarter	1	2	3	4	Total
Catamounts	3	0	7	3	13
Razorbacks	21	14	7	14	56

at War Memorial Stadium • Little Rock, Arkansas

- Date: Saturday, September 2, 2023
- Game time: 12:00 p.m. CST
- Game weather: Cloudy • Temperature: 82 °F (28 °C) • Wind: northeast 4 mph (6.4 km/h)
- Game attendance: 44,397
- Referee: Ken Williamson
- TV announcers (SEC Network+/ESPN+): Eric Frede (play-by-play), Jordan Reid (analyst)
- ESPN, NCAA

Game information

First quarter

- (13:03) Arkansas – Jaedon Wilson 65-yard pass from KJ Jefferson, Cam Little kick (Drive: 2 plays, 79 yards, 0:36; Arkansas 7–0)
- (8:40) Arkansas – Raheim Sanders 3-yard rush, Cam Little kick (Drive: 7 plays, 47 yards, 3:26; Arkansas 14–0)
- (3:03) Arkansas – Isaac TeSlaa 31-yard pass from KJ Jefferson, Cam Little kick (Drive: 1 play, 31 yards, 0:07; Arkansas 21–0)
- (0:15) Western Carolina – Richard McCollum 34-yard field goal (Drive: 8 plays, 59 yards, 2:41; Arkansas 21–3)

Second quarter

- (2:56) Arkansas – KJ Jefferson 17-yard rush, Cam Little kick (Drive: 5 plays, 32 yards, 2:18; Arkansas 28–3)
- (0:00) Arkansas – Raheim Sanders 1-yard rush, Cam Little kick (Drive: 8 plays, 47 yards, 2:44; Arkansas 35–3)

Third quarter

- (10:59) Western Carolina – Desmond Reid 2-yard rush, Richard McCollum kick (Drive: 6 plays, 53 yards, 2:12; Arkansas 35–10)
- (6:13) Arkansas – Andrew Armstrong 16-yard pass from KJ Jefferson, Cam Little kick (Drive: 9 plays, 69 yards, 4:39; Arkansas 42–10)

Fourth quarter

- (7:55) Arkansas – Davion Dozier 14-yard pass from Jacolby Criswell, Cam Little kick (Drive: 7 plays, 48 yards, 3:51; Arkansas 49–10)
- (4:19) Arkansas – Brad Spence 85-yard interception return (Arkansas 56–10)
- (0:00) Western Carolina – Richard McCollum 33-yard field goal (Drive: 13 plays, 60 yards, 4:19; Arkansas 56–13)

Statistics	WCU	ARK
First downs	18	21
Plays–yards	70–291	61–379
Rushes–yards	30–64	36–105
Passing yards	227	274
Passing: comp–att–int	25–40–4	20–25–0
Turnovers		
Time of possession	30:43	29:17

Team	Category	Player	Statistics
Western Carolina	Passing	Cole Gonzales	9–14, 118 yards, INT
Western Carolina	Rushing	Branson Adams	4 carries, 38 yards
Western Carolina	Receiving	Censere Lee	3 receptions, 41 yards
Arkansas	Passing	KJ Jefferson	18–23, 246 yards, 3 TD
Arkansas	Rushing	Raheim Sanders	15 carries, 42 yards, 2 TD
Arkansas	Receiving	Jaedon Wilson	3 receptions, 83 yards, TD

=== Kent State ===
Game Two – Kent State Golden Flashes (0–1) at Arkansas Razorbacks (1–0)

Quarter	1	2	3	4	Total
Golden Flashes	3	3	0	0	6
Razorbacks	7	7	7	7	28

at Donald W. Reynolds Razorback Stadium • Fayetteville, Arkansas

- Date: Saturday, September 9, 2023
- Game time: 3:00 p.m. CST
- Game weather: Sunny • Temperature: 83 °F (28 °C) • Wind: northeast 8 mph (13 km/h)
- Game attendance: 73,173
- Referee: Scott Walker
- TV announcers (SECN): Dave Neal (play-by-play), Derek Mason (analyst), Taylor Davis (sideline)
- ESPN NCAA

Game information

First quarter

- (3:24) Kent State – Andrew Glass 48-yard field goal (Drive: 11 plays, 51 yards, 6:52; Kent State 3–0)
- (1:12) Arkansas – Antonio Grier 25-yard interception return (Arkansas 7–3)

Second quarter

- (6:29) Kent State – Andrew Glass 38-yard field goal (Drive: 10 plays, 52 yards, 5:48; Arkansas 7–6)
- (2:20) Arkansas – Andrew Armstrong 5-yard pass from KJ Jefferson, Cam Little kick (Drive: 8 plays, 75 yards, 4:09; Arkansas 14–6)

Third quarter

- (5:50) Arkansas – Rashod Dubinion 1-yard rush, Cam Little kick (Drive: 12 plays, 91 yards, 6:28; Arkansas 21–6)

Fourth quarter

- (10:16) Arkansas – Andrew Armstrong 9-yard pass from KJ Jefferson, Cam Little kick (Drive: 15 plays, 73 yards, 7:54; Arkansas 28–6)

Statistics	KENT	ARK
First downs	14	19
Plays–yards	53–200	64–308
Rushes–yards	36–26	45–172
Passing yards	174	136
Passing: comp–att–int	11–17–1	13–19–0
Turnovers		
Time of possession	27:44	32:16

Team	Category	Player	Statistics
Kent State	Passing	Michael Alaimo	11–17, 174 yards, INT
Kent State	Rushing	Gavin Garcia	18 carries, 68 yards
Kent State	Receiving	Trell Harris	4 receptions, 78 yards
Arkansas	Passing	KJ Jefferson	13–19, 136 yards, 2 TD
Arkansas	Rushing	AJ Green	15 carries, 82 yards
Arkansas	Receiving	Isaac TeSlaa	3 receptions, 51 yards

=== BYU ===
Game Three – BYU Cougars (2–0) at Arkansas Razorbacks (2–0)

Quarter	1	2	3	4	Total
Cougars	14	7	10	7	38
Razorbacks	14	10	7	0	31

at Donald W. Reynolds Razorback Stadium • Fayetteville, Arkansas

- Date: Saturday, September 16, 2023
- Game time: 6:30 p.m. CST
- Game weather: 78 °F (26 °C), Winds NW 3 mph
- Game attendance: 74,826
- Referee: Kevin Boitmann
- TV announcers (ESPN2): Brian Custer (play-by-play), Rod Gilmore (analyst), Lauren Sisler (sideline)

Game information

First quarter

- (13:21) Arkansas – AJ Green 55-yard run, Cam Little kick (Drive: 4 plays, 75 yards, 1:39; Arkansas 7–0)
- (11:29) Arkansas – Isaiah Sategna 88-yard punt return, Cam Little kick (Arkansas 14–0)
- (8:28) BYU – Deion Smith 37-yard pass from Parker Kingston, Will Ferrin kick (Drive: 2 plays, 53 yards, 0:52; Arkansas 14–7)
- (2:24) BYU – LJ Martin 45-yard run, Will Ferrin kick (Drive: 1 play, 45 yards, 0:10; Tied 14–14)

Second quarter

- (12:54) BYU – LJ Martin 1-yard run, Will Ferrin kick (Drive: 10 plays, 70 yards, 3:20; BYU 21–14)
- (1:43) Arkansas – Luke Hasz 19-yard pass from KJ Jefferson, Cam Little kick (Drive: 2 plays, 53 yards, 0:52; Tied 21–21)
- (0:00) Arkansas – Cam Little 26-yard field goal (Drive: 5 plays, 36 yards, 1:34; Arkansas 24–21)

Third quarter

- (11:41) Arkansas – AJ Green 7-yard run, Cam Little kick (Drive: 4 plays, 53 yards, 1:57; Arkansas 31–21)
- (4:43) BYU – Will Ferrin 43-yard field goal (Drive: 6 plays, 24 yards, 2:31; Arkansas 31–24)
- (1:52) BYU – Parker Kingston 20-yard pass from Kedon Slovis, Will Ferrin kick (Drive: 1 play, 20 yards, 0:10; Tied 31–31)

Fourth quarter

- (8:00) BYU – Chase Roberts 7-yard pass from Kedon Slovis, Will Ferrin kick (Drive: 9 plays, 69 yards, 4:46; BYU 38–31)

Statistics	BYU	ARK
First downs	17	21
Plays–yards	57–281	74–424
Rushes–yards	31–77, 2 TD's	39–177, 2 TD's
Passing yards	204	247
Passing: comp–att–int	14–26, 3 TD's	24–35–1, 1 TD
Turnovers		
Time of possession	24:50	35:10

Team	Category	Player	Statistics
BYU	Passing	Kedon Slovis	13–25, 167 yards, 2 TD
BYU	Rushing	LJ Martin	23 carries, 77 yards, 2 TD
BYU	Receiving	Parker Kingston	3 receptions, 46 yards, TD
Arkansas	Passing	KJ Jefferson	24–35–1, 247 yards, TD
Arkansas	Rushing	AJ Green	9 carries, 86 yards, 2 TD
Arkansas	Receiving	Andrew Armstrong	9 receptions, 86 yards

=== at No. 12 LSU ===
Game Four – Arkansas Razorbacks at No. 12 LSU Tigers

Quarter	1	2	3	4	Total
Razorbacks	3	10	3	15	31
*No. 12 Tigers	0	10	14	10	34

at Tiger Stadium • Baton Rouge, Louisiana

- Date: Saturday, September 23, 2023
- TV announcers (ESPN): Chris Fowler (play-by-play), Kirk Herbstreit (analyst), Holly Rowe (sideline)

Game information

First quarter
Second quarter
Third quarter
Fourth quarter

Statistics	ARK	LSU
First downs		
Plays–yards	–	–
Rushes–yards	–	–
Passing yards		
Passing: comp–att–int	––	––
Turnovers		
Time of possession		

Team	Category	Player	Statistics
Arkansas	Passing		
Arkansas	Rushing		
Arkansas	Receiving		
LSU	Passing		
LSU	Rushing		
LSU	Receiving		

=== vs Texas A&M ===
Game Five – Texas A&M Aggies (3–1) vs Arkansas Razorbacks (2–2) – Game summary

Quarter	1	2	3	4	Total
Texas A&M	7	10	10	7	34
Arkansas	3	3	10	6	22

at AT&T Stadium, Arlington, Texas

- Date: Saturday, September 30, 2023
- Game time: 11:00 a.m. CDT
- Game weather: None (retractable roof closed)
- Game attendance: 59,437
- Referee: Lee Hedrick
- TV announcers (SECN): Dave Neal, Matt Stinchcomb, and Alyssa Lang
- Box score, Recap

Game information
First quarter
- (6:45) ARK – Cam Little 52-yard field goal (Drive: 15 plays, 42 yards, 8:15; Arkansas 3–0)
- (2:36) TXAM – Evan Stewart 32-yard pass from Max Johnson (Randy Bond kick) (Drive: 8 plays, 75 yards, 4:09; Texas A&M 7–3)

Second quarter

- (13:00) ARK – Cam Little 25-yard field goal (Drive: 10 plays, 69 yards, 4:30; Texas A&M 7–6)
- (10:26) TXAM – Randy Bond 42-yard field goal (Drive: 8 plays, 51 yards, 2:34; Texas A&M 10–6)
- (0:13) TXAM – Earnest Crownover 2-yard pass from Max Johnson (Randy Bond kick) (Drive: 8 plays, 39 yards, 2:36; Texas A&M 17–6)

Third quarter

- (14:54) ARK – Lorando Johnson 20-yard interception return (Cam Little kick) (Texas A&M 17–13)
- (11:11) TXAM – Randy Bond 34-yard field goal (Drive: 8 plays, 58 yards, 3:43; Texas A&M 20–13)
- (7:58) ARK – Cam Little 50-yard field goal (Drive: 4 plays, 3 yards, 0:44; Texas A&M 20–16)
- (5:15) TXAM – Chris Russell Jr. 16-yard interception return (Randy Bond kick) (Texas A&M 27–16)

Fourth quarter

- (7:40) TXAM – Ainias Smith 82-yard punt return (Randy Bond kick) (Texas A&M 34–16)
- (3:53) ARK – Andrew Armstrong 48-yard pass from KJ Jefferson (pass failed) (Drive: 4 plays, 64 yards, 1:05; Texas A&M 34–22)

Statistics	TXAM	ARK
First downs	19	10
Total yards	67–414	56–174
Rushing yards	39–204	39–42
Passing yards	210	132
Passing: Comp–Att–Int	17–28–1	9–17–1
Time of possession	30:33	29:27

Team	Category	Player	Statistics
Texas A&M	Passing	Max Johnson	17/28, 210 yards, 2 TD, INT
Texas A&M	Rushing	Le'Veon Moss	17 carries, 107 yards
Texas A&M	Receiving	Ainias Smith	4 receptions, 71 yards
Arkansas	Passing	KJ Jefferson	9/17, 132 yards, TD, INT
Arkansas	Rushing	Raheim Sanders	11 carries, 34 yards
Arkansas	Receiving	Andrew Armstrong	3 receptions, 78 yards, TD

=== at No. 16 Ole Miss ===
Game Six – Arkansas Razorbacks at Ole Miss Rebels

Quarter	1	2	3	4	Total
Razorbacks	7	0	6	7	20
No. 16 Rebels	10	7	0	10	27

at Vaught–Hemingway Stadium • Oxford, Mississippi

- Date: Saturday, October 7, 2023
- Game time: 6:30 p.m. CST
- Game weather: Clear Skies • Temperature: 61 °F (16 °C)
- Game attendance: 65,748
- Referee: Ken Williamson
- TV announcers (SECN): Tom Hart (play-by-play), Jordan Rodgers (analyst), Cole Cubelic (sideline)

Game information

First Quarter

- (6:08) Arkansas – Ty Washington 3 Yd pass from KJ Jefferson (Cam Little Kick) (Arkansas 7–0; 15 plays, 80 yards, 7:46)
- (2:47) Ole Miss – Caden Davis 27 Yd Field Goal (Arkansas 7–3; 10 plays, 66 yards, 3:21)
- (0:29) Ole Miss – Quinshon Judkins 1 Yd Run (Caden Davis Kick) (Ole Miss 10–7; 4 plays, 3 yards, 1:45)

Second Quarter

- (1:34) Ole Miss – Dayton Wade 6 Yd pass from Jaxson Dart (Caden Davis Kick) Ole Miss 17–7; 5 plays, 50 yards, 1:02

Third Quarter

- (10:07) Arkansas – Cam Little 56 Yd Field Goal Ole Miss 17–10; 10 plays, 37 yards, 4:53
- (2:46) Arkansas – Cam Little 26 Yd Field Goal Ole Miss 17–13; 11 plays, 31 yards, 5:12

Fourth Quarter

- (13:11) Arkansas – Ty Washington 17 Yd pass from KJ Jefferson (Cam Little Kick) Arkansas 20–17; 6 plays, 72 yards, 2:52
- (7:49) Ole Miss – Ulysses Bentley IV 7 Yd Run (Caden Davis Kick) Ole Miss 24–20; 12 plays, 75 yards, 5:22
- (2:43) Ole Miss – Caden Davis 22 Yd Field Goal Ole Miss 27–20; 8 plays, 63 yards, 3:01

Statistics	ARK	MISS
First downs	17	21
Plays–yards	68–286	70–349
Rushes–yards	29–36	45–196
Passing yards	250	153
Passing: comp–att–int	25–39–2	16–25–0
Turnovers		
Time of possession	32:32	27:28

Team	Category	Player	Statistics
Arkansas	Passing	KJ Jefferson	25/39, 250 yards, 2 TD, 2 INT
Arkansas	Rushing	Raheim Sanders	8 carries, 15 yards
Arkansas	Receiving	Ty Washington	7 receptions, 90 yards, 2 TD
Ole Miss	Passing	Jaxson Dart	16/25, 153 yards, 1 TD
Ole Miss	Rushing	Ulysses Bentley IV	13 carries, 94 yards, 1 TD
Ole Miss	Receiving	Jordan Watkins	7 receptions, 86 yards

=== at No. 11 Alabama ===
Game Seven – Arkansas Razorbacks at Alabama Crimson Tide

Quarter	1	2	3	4	Total
Razorbacks	6	0	7	8	21
No. 11 Crimson Tide	7	14	3	0	24

at Bryant–Denny Stadium • Tuscaloosa, Alabama

- Date: Saturday, October 14, 2023
- Game time: 11:00 a.m. CST
- Game weather: Sunny • Temperature: 71 °F (22 °C) • Wind: E @ 7 mph
- Game attendance: 100,077
- Referee: Scott Walker
- TV announcers (ESPN): Dave Pasch (play-by-play), Dusty Dvoracek (color), and Tom Luginbill (sideline)

Game information

First quarter
Second quarter
Third quarter
Fourth quarter

Statistics	ARK	ALA
First downs	13	18
Plays–yards	–250	–450
Rushes–yards	–100	–177
Passing yards	150	238
Passing: comp–att–int	––	––
Turnovers		
Time of possession	30:11	29:49

Team	Category	Player	Statistics
Arkansas	Passing	KJ Jefferson	14/24, 150 yards, 2 TD
Arkansas	Rushing	AJ Green	6 carries, 44 yards
Arkansas	Receiving	Andrew Armstrong	4 receptions, 48 yards
Alabama	Passing	Jalen Milroe	10/21, 238 yards, 2 TD
Alabama	Rushing	Jase McClellan	16 carries, 83 yards
Alabama	Receiving	Kobe Prentice	2 receptions, 93 yards, 1 TD

=== vs Mississippi State ===
Game Eight – Mississippi State Bulldogs (3–3) at Arkansas Razorbacks (2–5) – Game summary

Quarter	1	2	3	4	Total
Mississippi State	0	7	0	0	7
Arkansas	3	0	0	0	3

at Donald W. Reynolds Razorback Stadium • Fayetteville, Arkansas

- Date: Saturday, October 21, 2023
- Game time: 11:00 a.m. CST
- Game weather: –
- Game attendance: 71,505
- Referee: –
- TV announcers (ESPN): TBD

Game information

First quarter

Second quarter

Third quarter

Fourth quarter

Statistics	MSST	ARK
First downs	10	12
Total yards	205	200
Rushing yards	120	103
Passing yards	85	97
Passing: Comp–Att–Int	8–12–1	19–31–1
Time of possession	28:35	31:25

Team	Category	Player	Statistics
Mississippi State	Passing	Mike Wright	8/12, 85 yards, TD, INT
Mississippi State	Rushing	Mike Wright	11 carries, 60 yards
Mississippi State	Receiving	Justin Robinson	2 receptions, 40 yards
Arkansas	Passing	KJ Jefferson	19/31, 97 yards, INT
Arkansas	Rushing	Rashod Dubinion	14 carries, 47 yards
Arkansas	Receiving	Andrew Armstrong	4 receptions, 35 yards

=== at Florida ===
Overall record	Previous meeting	Previous winner	Score
10–2	November 14, 2020	Florida	63–35

Game Nine – Arkansas Razorbacks (2–6) at Florida Gators (5–3) – Game summary

Quarter	1	2	3	4	OT	Total
Arkansas	14	3	3	13	6	39
Florida	14	3	6	10	3	36

at Ben Hill Griffin Stadium • Gainesville, Florida

- Date: Saturday, November 4, 2023
- Game time: 12:01 p.m. EDT
- Game weather: Temperature: 66 °F (19 °C) • Wind: N at 4 miles per hour (6.4 km/h) • Weather: sunny
- Game attendance: 89,782
- Referee: Lee Hedrick
- TV announcers (ESPN2): Roy Philpott (play-by-play), Roddy Jones (analyst), Taylor McGregor (sideline reporter)
- Boxscore

Game information

First quarter

- (12:06) ARK – AJ Green 8-yard pass from KJ Jefferson (Cam Little kick) (Drive: 7 plays, 75 yards, 2:54; Arkansas 7-0)
- (11:54) ARK – Jaylon Braxton 33-yard fumble recovery (Cam Little kick) (Arkansas 14-0)
- (5:33) FLA – Eugene Wilson III 19-yard pass from Graham Mertz (Trey Smack kick) (Drive: 6 plays, 33 yards, 2:49; Arkansas 14-7)
- (2:04) FLA – Eugene Wilson III 6-yard pass from Graham Mertz (Trey Smack kick) (Drive: 4 plays, 42 yards, 2:13; Tied 14-14)

Second quarter

- (4:39) ARK – Cam Little 37-yard field goal (Drive: 8 plays, 64 yards, 2:55; Arkansas 17-14)
- (0:29) FLA – Trey Smack 47-yard field goal (Drive: 12 plays, 46 yards, 4:10; Tied 17-17)

Third quarter

- (10:34) ARK – Cam Little 41-yard field goal (Drive: 7 plays, 57 yards, 2:15; Arkansas 20-17)
- (1:38) FLA – Ricky Pearsall 32-yard pass from Graham Mertz (run failed) (Drive: 1 play, 32 yards, 0:08; Florida 23-20)

Fourth quarter

- (12:54) ARK – Cam Little 22-yard field goal (Drive: 10 plays, 66 yards, 3:36; Tied 23-23)
- (7:58) FLA – Trey Smack 34-yard field goal (Drive: 12 plays, 59 yards, 4:56; Florida 26-23)
- (4:26) ARK – KJ Jefferson 25-yard run (Cam Little kick) (Drive: 10 plays, 84 yards, 3:27; Arkansas 30-26)
- (3:02) FLA – Trevor Etienne 26-yard run (Trey Smack kick) (Drive: 3 plays, 72 yards, 1:17; Florida 33-30)
- (0:44) ARK – Cam Little 49-yard field goal (Drive: 8 plays, 44 yards, 2:18; Tied 33-33)

Overtime

- FLA – Trey Smack 39-yard field goal (Drive: 4 plays, 4 yards; Florida 36-33)
- ARK – Tyrone Broden 4-yard pass from KJ Jefferson (Drive: 3 plays, 25 yards; Arkansas 39-36)

Statistics	ARK	FLA
First downs	23	20
Total yards	78–481	70–394
Rushing yards	47–226	28–112
Passing yards	255	282
Passing: Comp–Att–Int	20–31–1	26–42–0
Time of possession	29:46	30:14

Team	Category	Player	Statistics
Arkansas	Passing	KJ Jefferson	20/31, 255 yards, 2 TD, INT
Arkansas	Rushing	Raheim Sanders	18 carries, 103 yards
Arkansas	Receiving	Andrew Armstrong	3 receptions, 103 yards
Florida	Passing	Graham Mertz	26/42, 282 yards, 3 TD
Florida	Rushing	Trevor Etienne	12 carries, 80 yards, TD
Florida	Receiving	Eugene Wilson III	8 receptions, 90 yards, 2 TD

=== Auburn ===
Game Ten – Auburn Tigers at Arkansas Razorbacks

Quarter	1	2	3	4	Total
Tigers	21	6	21	0	48
Razorbacks	3	0	0	7	10

at Donald W. Reynolds Razorback Stadium • Fayetteville, Arkansas

- Date: Saturday, November 11, 2023
- Game time: 3:01 p.m. CST
- Game weather: Sunny • Temperature: 61 °F (16 °C) • Wind: SE 6 mph
- Game attendance: 72,033
- Referee: Scott Walker
- TV announcers (SEC Network): Dave Neal (play-by-play), Derek Mason (analyst), Alex Chappell (sideline reporter)

Game information

First quarter
Second quarter
Third quarter
Fourth quarter

Statistics	AUB	ARK
First downs	32	10
Plays–yards	76–517	52–255
Rushes–yards	55–354	32–120
Passing yards	163	135
Passing: comp–att–int	12–21–2	12–20–1
Turnovers		
Time of possession	38:15	21:45

Team	Category	Player	Statistics
Auburn	Passing	Payton Thorne	163 yards, 3 TD passes
Auburn	Rushing	Jarquez Hunter	109 yards
Auburn	Receiving	Ja'Varrius Johnson	3 receptions, 1 TD
Arkansas	Passing	KJ Jefferson	116 yards
Arkansas	Rushing	Jacolby Criswell	64 yards
Arkansas	Receiving	Isaac TeSlaa	3 receptions, 32 yards

=== FIU ===
Game Eleven – FIU Panthers at Arkansas Razorbacks

Quarter	1	2	3	4	Total
Panthers	-	-	-	-	0
Razorbacks	-	-	-	-	0

at Donald W. Reynolds Razorback Stadium • Fayetteville, Arkansas

- Date: Saturday, November 18, 2023
- Game time: 6:30 p.m. CST
- Game attendance: 61,442
- TV: ESPNU

Game information

First quarter
Second quarter
Third quarter
Fourth quarter

Statistics	FIU	ARK
First downs		
Plays–yards	–	–
Rushes–yards	–	–
Passing yards		
Passing: comp–att–int	––	––
Turnovers		
Time of possession		

Team	Category	Player	Statistics
FIU	Passing		
FIU	Rushing		
FIU	Receiving		
Arkansas	Passing		
Arkansas	Rushing		
Arkansas	Receiving		

=== vs No. 9 Missouri ===
Game Twelve – No. 9 Missouri Tigers (9–2) at Arkansas Razorbacks (4–7) (Battle Line Rivalry) – Game summary

Quarter	1	2	3	4	Total
No. 9 Missouri	10	10	21	7	48
Arkansas	0	0	0	14	14

at Donald W. Reynolds Razorback Stadium • Fayetteville, Arkansas

- Date: Friday, November 24, 2023
- Game time: 3:00 p.m. CST
- Game weather: Clear skies, 54 degrees, 7 mph NE wind
- Game attendance: 59,847
- Referee: Daniel Gautreaux
- TV announcers (CBS): Rich Waltz (play-by-play), Aaron Taylor (analyst), and Amanda Guerra (sideline)

Game information

First quarter

- (9:12) MIZ – Cody Schrader 2-yard run (Harrison Mevis kick) (Drive: 7 plays, 54 yards, 3:29; Missouri 7-0)
- (4:45) MIZ – Harrison Mevis 24-yard field goal (Drive: 10 plays, 41 yards, 4:14; Missouri 10-0)

Second quarter

- (5:35) MIZ – Brady Cook 3-yard run (Harrison Mevis kick) (Drive: 6 plays, 71 yards, 2:56; Missouri 17-0)
- (0:49) MIZ – Harrison Mevis 22-yard field goal (Drive: 7 plays, 69 yards, 3:26; Missouri 20-0)

Third quarter

- (11:43) MIZ – Brett Norfleet 16-yard pass from Brady Cook (Harrison Mevis kick) (Drive: 5 plays, 38 yards, 2:26; Missouri 27-0)
- (11:32) MIZ – Brett Norfleet 11-yard pass from Brady Cook (Harrison Mevis kick) (Drive: 1 play, 11 yards, 0:06; Missouri 34-0)
- (5:06) MIZ – Jayden Jernigan 10-yard fumble return (Harrison Mevis kick) (Missouri 41-0)

Fourth quarter

- (11:35) ARK – Andrew Armstrong 8-yard pass from Jacolby Criswell (Cam Little kick) (Drive: 15 plays, 75 yards, 8:31; Missouri 41-7)
- (5:48) ARK – Isaiah Augustave 6-yard run (Cam Little kick) (Drive: 8 plays, 70 yards, 4:18; Missouri 41-14)
- (2:37) MIZ – Nathaniel Peat 1-yard run (Harrison Mevis kick) (Drive: 6 plays, 26 yards, 3:07; Missouri 48-14)

Statistics	MIZZ	ARK
First downs	17	13
Total yards	370	225
Rushing yards	258	127
Passing yards	112	98
Passing: Comp–Att–Int	12–21–0	14–22–0
Time of possession	31:20	28:40

Team	Category	Player	Statistics
Missouri	Passing	Brady Cook	12–20, 112 yards, 2 TD
Missouri	Rushing	Cody Schrader	27 carries, 217 yards, 1 TD
Missouri	Receiving	Luther Burden III	6 receptions, 55 yards
Arkansas	Passing	Jacolby Criswell	12–20, 96 yards, 1 TD
Arkansas	Rushing	Isaiah Augustave	15 carries, 80 yards, 1 TD
Arkansas	Receiving	Andrew Armstrong	4 receptions, 40 yards, 1 TD

== Personnel ==
=== Coaching staff ===
Arkansas Razorbacks coaches
Coach	Position	Year	Alma mater
Sam Pittman	Head coach	4th	Pittsburg State (1986)
Scott Fountain	Assistant head coach/Special teams coordinator	4th	Samford (1988)
^ @ Dan Enos	Offensive coordinator/quarterbacks coach	4th	Michigan State (1991)
Travis Williams	Defensive coordinator/ Linebackers coach	1st	Auburn (2005)
Marcus Woodson	co-Defensive coordinator/ Safeties coach	1st	Ole Miss (2003)
Morgan Turner	Tight ends coach	1st	Illinois (2009)
Cody Kennedy	Offensive line coach	3rd	Southeastern Louisiana (2012)
% Kenny Guiton	Wide receivers coach	3rd	Ohio State (2013)
Jimmy Smith	Running backs coach	4th	Fayetteville State (2002)
Deke Adams	Defensive line coach	2nd	Southern Miss (1995)
Deron Wilson	Defensive backs coach	1st	Southern Miss (2013)
Ben Sowders	Strength and conditioning coach	1st	Western Kentucky (2008)

^ – Dan Enos was Arkansas' OC from 2015 to 2017.

@ – Dan Enos was fired as offensive coordinator after the eighth game of the season.

% – Kenny Guiton was the interim offensive coordinator beginning with the ninth game of the season.

=== Recruits ===
The Razorbacks signed a total of 19 recruits on the first day of the early signing period, December 21, 2022, all from high school for the 2023 class. Arkansas also signed one recruit on opening day of the late signing period which began on February 1, 2023, and two additional recruits signed in June, for a total of 21 high school signees and on junior college signee.

College recruiting (2023)
Name	Hometown	School	Height	Weight	Commit date
Jaylon Braxton; CB	Frisco, TX.	Lone Star	6 ft 0 in (1.83 m)	170 lb (77 kg)	
Jaylon Braxton; CB	Recruit ratings: Rivals: 247Sports: ESPN:				
Shamar Easter; TE	Ashdown, AR.	Ashdown	6 ft 5 in (1.96 m)	230 lb (100 kg)	
Shamar Easter; TE	Recruit ratings: Rivals: 247Sports: ESPN:				
Luke Hasz; TE	Bixby, OK.	Bixby	6 ft 3 in (1.91 m)	245 lb (111 kg)	
Luke Hasz; TE	Recruit ratings: Rivals: 247Sports: ESPN:				
Isaiah Augustave; RB	Naples, FL.	Naples	6 ft 2 in (1.88 m)	200 lb (91 kg)	
Isaiah Augustave; RB	Recruit ratings: Rivals: 247Sports: ESPN:				
Luke Brown; OL	Paris, TN.	Henry County	6 ft 5 in (1.96 m)	315 lb (143 kg)	
Luke Brown; OL	Recruit ratings: Rivals: 247Sports: ESPN:				
Malachi Singleton; QB	Kennesaw, GA.	North Cobb	6 ft 1 in (1.85 m)	225 lb (102 kg)	
Malachi Singleton; QB	Recruit ratings: Rivals: 247Sports: ESPN:				
Davion Dozier; WR	Moody, AL.	Moody	6 ft 5 in (1.96 m)	200 lb (91 kg)	
Davion Dozier; WR	Recruit ratings: Rivals: 247Sports: ESPN:				
Quincy Rhodes Jr. DE	North Little Rock, AR.	North Little Rock	6 ft 7 in (2.01 m)	255 lb (116 kg)	
Quincy Rhodes Jr. DE	Recruit ratings: Rivals: 247Sports: ESPN:				
Paris Patterson; OL	East St. Louis, IL.	East St. Louis	6 ft 6 in (1.98 m)	345 lb (156 kg)	
Paris Patterson; OL	Recruit ratings: Rivals: 247Sports: ESPN:				
T.J. Metcalf; S	Pinson, AL.	Pinson Valley	6 ft 1 in (1.85 m)	185 lb (84 kg)	
T.J. Metcalf; S	Recruit ratings: Rivals: 247Sports: ESPN:				
Dallas Young; CB	Gardendale, AL.	Gardendale	6 ft 0 in (1.83 m)	185 lb (84 kg)	
Dallas Young; CB	Recruit ratings: Rivals: 247Sports: ESPN:				
Christian Ford; S	McKinney, TX	McKinney	6 ft 0 in (1.83 m)	185 lb (84 kg)	
Christian Ford; S	Recruit ratings: Rivals: 247Sports: ESPN:				
Kaleb James; DL	Mansfield, TX.	Mansfield	6 ft 4 in (1.93 m)	260 lb (120 kg)	
Kaleb James; DL	Recruit ratings: Rivals: 247Sports: ESPN:				
Carson Dean; LB	Carrollton, TX.	Hebron	6 ft 4 in (1.93 m)	230 lb (100 kg)	
Carson Dean; LB	Recruit ratings: Rivals: 247Sports: ESPN:				
Dazmin James; WR	Clayton, NC.	Clayton	6 ft 2 in (1.88 m)	185 lb (84 kg)	
Dazmin James; WR	Recruit ratings: 247Sports: ESPN:				
Alex Sanford; LB	Oxford, MS.	Oxford	6 ft 3 in (1.91 m)	240 lb (110 kg)	
Alex Sanford; LB	Recruit ratings: Rivals: 247Sports: ESPN:				
R.J. Johnson; ATH	McDonough, GA.	Eagles Landing Christian Academy	6 ft 2 in (1.88 m)	175 lb (79 kg)	
R.J. Johnson; ATH	Recruit ratings: Rivals: 247Sports: ESPN:				
Joey Su'a; OL	Bentonville, AR	Bentonville	6 ft 4 in (1.93 m)	320 lb (150 kg)	
Joey Su'a; OL	Recruit ratings: Rivals: 247Sports: ESPN:				
Brad Spence; DE	Houston, TX.	Klein Forest	6 ft 3 in (1.91 m)	225 lb (102 kg)	
Brad Spence; DE	Recruit ratings: Rivals: 247Sports: ESPN:				
Ian Geffrard; DL	Mableton, GA.	Whitefield Academy	6 ft 6 in (1.98 m)	350 lb (160 kg)	
Ian Geffrard; DL	Recruit ratings: Rivals: 247Sports: ESPN:				
Dylan Hasz; S	Bixby, OK.	Bixby	6 ft 0 in (1.83 m)	180 lb (82 kg)	
Dylan Hasz; S	Recruit ratings: Rivals: 247Sports: ESPN:				
Amaury Wiggins; OL	Pensacola, FL.	Pine Forrest	6 ft 3 in (1.91 m)	310 lb (140 kg)	Coffeyville C.C.
Amaury Wiggins; OL	Recruit ratings: 247Sports:				
Overall recruit ranking: Rivals: 21 247Sports: 26 ESPN: 22
Note: In many cases, Scout, Rivals, 247Sports, On3, and ESPN may conflict in their listings of height and weight.; In these cases, the average was taken. ESPN grades are on a 100-point scale.; Sources: "Arkansas Football Commitments". Rivals.; "2023 Team Ranking". Rivals.com.

=== Transfers ===
Arkansas signed 19 transfer players from the NCAA transfer portal, although Brathwaite left the team in early August. According to 247Sports Arkansas has the #11 portal transfer class in the nation; On3.com ranks Arkansas' portal class at #7; rivals.com ranks Arkansas' portal class at #20, but their rankings are not up-to-date.

Pos.	Portal Rating	Player	Height	Weight	Former school	Year	Hometown	Note
CB	5☆	Jaheim Singletary	6'2.5"	180	Georgia	Redshirt Freshman	Jacksonville, FL	
WR	4☆	Andrew Armstrong	6'4"	200	Texas A&M-Commerce	Senior	Dallas, TX	
CB	4☆	Lorando Johnson	6'0"	195	Baylor	Junior	Lancaster, TX	
QB	4☆	Jacolby Criswell	6'1"	225	North Carolina	Junior	Morrilton, AR	
WR	4☆	Tyrone Broden	6'7"	200	Bowling Green	Junior	West Bloomfield, MI	
DT	4☆	Anthony "Tank" Booker	6'4"	320	Maryland	Senior	Cincinnati, OH	
LB	4☆	Jaheim Thomas	6'4"	245	Cincinnati	Junior	Cincinnati, OH	
TE	4☆	Var'Keyes Gumms	6'3"	235	North Texas	Sophomore	Houston, TX	
DE	3☆	John Morgan III	6'2"	270	Pittsburgh	Senior	Hyattsville, MD	
S	3☆	Al Walcott	6'2"	215	Baylor	Senior	Wilmington, NC	
LB	3☆	Antonio Grier	6'1"	225	South Florida	Senior	Atlanta, GA	
OL	3☆	Josh Braun	6'6"	340	Florida	Junior	Live Oak, FL	
WR	3☆	Marlon Crockett	6'4"	205	Memphis	Sophomore	Searcy, AR	preferred walk-on
WR	3☆	Isaac TeSlaa	6'4"	215	Hillsdale	Junior	Hudsonville, MI	
DE	3☆	Trajan Jeffcoat	6'4"	280	Missouri	Senior	Columbia, SC	
DT	3☆	Keivie Rose	6'3"	305	Louisiana Tech	Senior	Henderson, TX	
S	3☆	Arthur Brathwaite	6'0"	180	Western Kentucky	Senior	Hollywood, FL	
CB	3☆	Keeyon Stewart	5'11"	180	TCU	Senior	Houston, TX	
TE	3☆	Francis Sherman	6'3"	235	Louisville	Junior	Bay Village, OH	

=== Depth chart ===
Defense
4–2–5

FS
17 Hudson Clark
18 TJ Metcalf
19 Dallas Young

WILL	MIKE	NICKELBACK
28 Jaheim Thomas	27 Chris Paul Jr.	1 Lorando Johnson
–	36 Jordan Crook	21 Jaylen Lewis
–	35 Mani Powell	–

SS
13 Al Walcott
8 Jayden Johnson
4 Malik Chavis

CB
2 Dwight McGlothern
11 LaDarrius Bishop
16 Jaylon Braxton

DE	DT	DT	DE
7 Trajan Jeffcoat	50 Eric Gregory	9 Taurean Carter	40 Landon Jackson
6 John Morgan III	10 Anthony "Tank" Booker	5 Cameron Ball	56 Zach Williams
58 Jashaud Stewart	95 Ian Geffrard	42 Keivie Rose	0 Nico Davillier

CB
15 Jaheim Singletary
25 Keeyon Stewart
14 RJ Johnson

Offense
West Coast Spread

WR
2 Andrew Armstrong
17 Tyrone Broden
88 Davion Dozier

SLOT
16 Isaiah Sategna III
14 Bryce Stephens
83 Dazmin James

LT	LG	C	RG	RT
51 Devon Manuel	62 Brady Latham	55 Beaux Limmer	78 Joshua Braun	75 Patrick Kutas
72 Andrew Chamblee	76 E'Marion Harris	52 Amaury Wiggins	50 Cole Carson	53 Ty'Kieast Crawford
63 Terry Wells	54 Joey Su'a	59 Eli Henderson	70 Paris Patterson	74 Luke Brown

TE
9 Luke Hasz
8 Ty Washington
30 Var'Keyes Gumms

WR
4 Isaac TeSlaa
13 Jaedon Wilson
WR2_Third

QB
1 KJ Jefferson
6 Jacolby Criswell
10 Cade Fortin

Key reserves
Offense
Defense
Special teams
Out (indefinitely) Quincey McAdoo CB
Out (season)
Out (suspended)
Out (retired)

Special teams
PK 29 Cam Little
PK 39 Tyler Larco
P 31 Max Fletcher
P 37 Devin Bale
KR 0 AJ Green
PR 14 Bryce Stephens
LS 48 Eli Stein
H 31 Max Fletcher

RB
5 Raheim Sanders
7 Rashod Dubinion
0 AJ Green

True Freshman
