= Sam Pittman =

American football player and coach (born 1961)

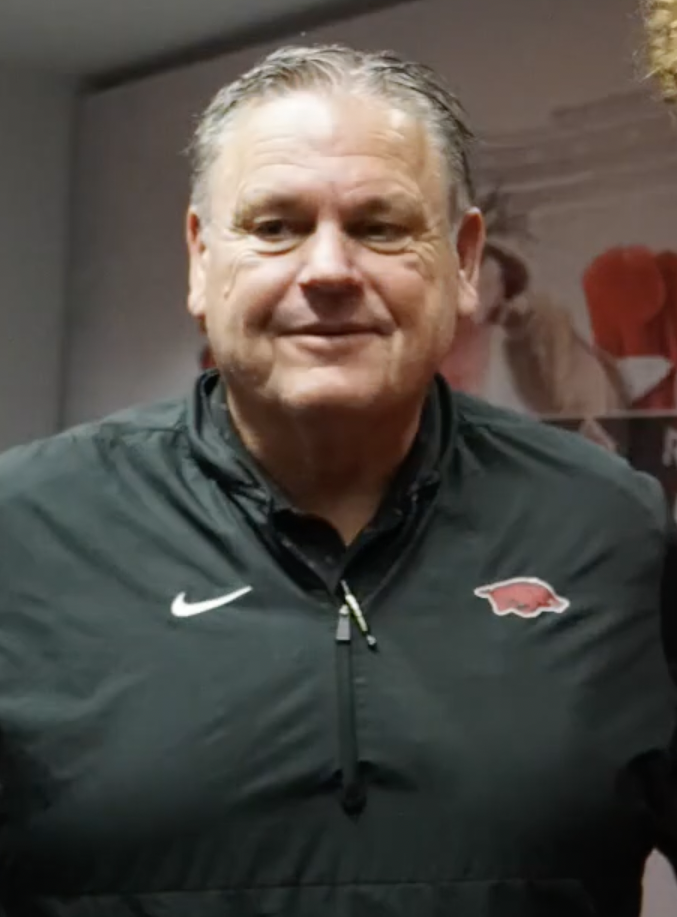
- Pittman in 2023

Biographical details
- Born: November 28, 1961 (age 64); El Reno, Oklahoma, U.S.
- Education: Pittsburg State University; B.S., Education

Playing career
- 1980–1983: Pittsburg State
- Position: Defensive end

Coaching career (HC unless noted)
- 1984–1985: Pittsburg State (KS) (GA)
- 1986: Beggs HS (OK) (OC)
- 1987–1988: Princeton HS (MO)
- 1989–1990: Trenton HS (MO)
- 1991: Hutchinson CC (KS) (OL)
- 1992–1993: Hutchinson CC (KS)
- 1994–1995: Northern Illinois (OL)
- 1996: Cincinnati (OT/TE)
- 1997–1998: Oklahoma (OL)
- 1999: Western Michigan (AHC)
- 2000: Missouri (OL)
- 2001: Kansas (OL)
- 2003: Northern Illinois (OL)
- 2004–2006: Northern Illinois (AHC/OL)
- 2007–2010: North Carolina (OL)
- 2011: North Carolina (AHC/OL)
- 2012: Tennessee (OL)
- 2013–2015: Arkansas (AHC/OL)
- 2016–2018: Georgia (OL)
- 2019: Georgia (AHC/OL)
- 2020–2025: Arkansas

Head coaching record
- Overall: 32–34 (college); 11–9–1 (junior college)
- Bowls: 3–0 (college); 0–1 (junior college)
- Tournaments: 1–2 (KJCCC playoffs)

Accomplishments and honors

Awards
- AFCA Region 2 Coach of the Year (2021)

Sam Pittman (born November 28, 1961) is an American college football coach who most recently served as the head football coach at the University of Arkansas from 2020 to 2025. Pittman spent almost his entire career, going back to the mid-1990s, as an offensive line coach at various college football programs. He also became known as one of the country's top recruiters of offensive linemen.

== Playing career ==
Pittman was born in El Reno, Oklahoma. His father, Don, moved the family to Grove, Oklahoma because Grove High School had better recruiting prospects. Pittman, a multi-sport athlete in high school, attended Pittsburg State University in Pittsburg, Kansas. He played defensive end at Pittsburg State from 1980 to 1983 and in his senior year was named a National Association of Intercollegiate Athletics (NAIA) All-American. Pittsburg State inducted him into their Athletic Hall of Fame in 1998.

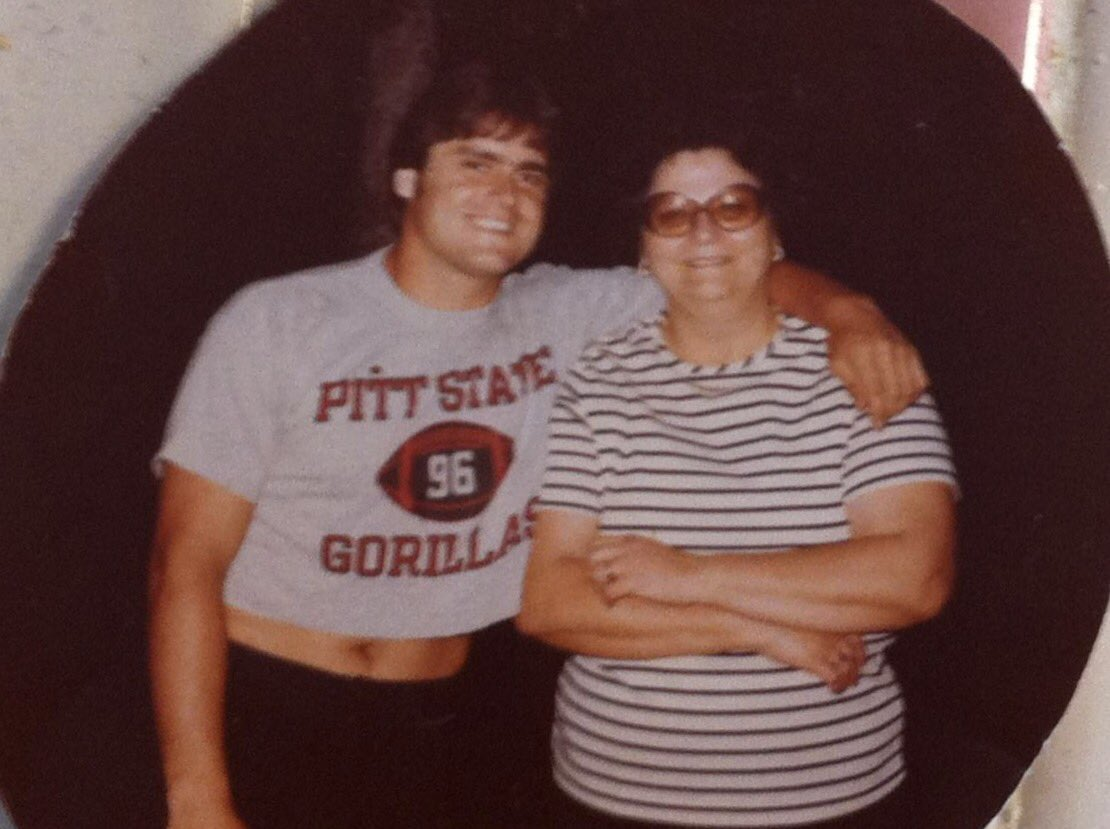
Pittman and his mother during his playing days

In 1981, Pittman's sophomore year, Pittsburg State went 10–2 and lost the NAIA Division I Championship. Head coach Ron Randleman parlayed this success into the head coaching job at Sam Houston State University. His successor at Pittsburg State was defensive coordinator Bruce Polen, who had recruited Pittman in high school. Pittman accompanied Polen on several recruiting trips while still a student; in 2020 Polen would reflect on Pittman's natural affinity for recruiting:

Sam had just great people skills. The first time you meet him, you think you've been his friend for a long time. That's one of the reasons I believe he's probably the No. 1 college recruiter in the country.

— Bruce Polen, "How a young Sam Pittman refined his skills with Bruce Polen and Ron Randleman" (2020), Kelli Stacy

== Coaching career ==
=== High school ===
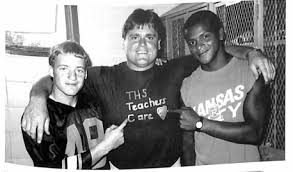
Former Trenton High School football coach Sam Pittman, center, poses with students Chad Plowman, left, and Brian Grimes, right, during the 1990–1991 school year.

Following his graduation from Pittsburg State, Pittman spent two years there as a student assistant coach before becoming offensive coordinator at Beggs High School in Beggs, Oklahoma, for the 1986 season. Following that stint Pittman served as head coach for Princeton Junior-Senior High School in Princeton, Missouri, from 1987 to 1988, and Trenton High School in Trenton, Missouri, from 1989 to 1990.

=== College assistant ===
In 1991, Pittman was hired as the offensive line coach at Hutchinson Community College in Hutchinson, Kansas. The following year he was named head coach, replacing Glenn Percy. Pittman compiled an 11–9–1 record over two seasons. Pittman was credited with reviving a "struggling" program. Northern Illinois hired Pittman as its offensive line coach in February 1994. Then-head coach Charlie Sadler described Pittman as "one of the top up-and-coming offensive line coaches in the country." Sadler was fired after the 1995 season, and Pittman moved over to the University of Cincinnati, joining Rick Minter's staff as tight ends coach. Other coaches on that staff included future NFL head coaches Rex Ryan (defensive coordinator) and John Harbaugh (assistant head coach).

Pittman left Cincinnati after the 1996 season to become the offensive line coach at the University of Oklahoma under second-year coach John Blake. Rex Ryan followed Pittman to Oklahoma after Blake reshuffled his coaching staff at the end of the 1997 season. Oklahoma fired Blake after the 1998 season and Pittman moved over to Western Michigan University to join Gary Darnell's staff, again as offensive line coach. At the end of 1999 Pittman and offensive coordinator Bill Cubit departed Western Michigan to take up the same positions at the University of Missouri under Larry Smith. Missouri fired Smith at the end of the 2000 season; Pittman moved over to the University of Kansas under Terry Allen. Allen had reshuffled his coaching staff following a disappointing 4–7 season in 2000; in 2001 team went 3–8 and Allen was fired.

Pittman returned to the coaching ranks in 2003 as the offensive line coach at Northern Illinois, the same job he had held in 1994–1995. The head coach was Joe Novak, who had replaced the fired Sadler after the 1995 season. Northern Illinois promoted Pittman to assistant head coach for the 2004 season. Pittman departed Northern Illinois after the 2006 season to join new University of North Carolina head coach Butch Davis' staff as offensive line coach. Pittman was considered a potential head coach at Northern Illinois after Jerry Kill, Novak's successor, departed for the University of Minnesota after the 2010 season. Davis was dismissed before the 2011 because of an academic scandal; Pittman was considered for the interim head coach job which eventually went to Everett Withers.

After the 2011 season, Pittman took the offensive line coach job at the University of Tennessee under Derek Dooley. This was not the first time Pittman was added to a coaching staff just reshuffled because of poor performance. Tennessee fired Dooley at the end of season, and Pittman joined new University of Arkansas head coach Bret Bielema's staff as assistant head coach/offensive line coach, where he spent the 2013 through 2015 seasons. During his time at Arkansas, Pittman fielded some of the best offensive lines in college football, including the biggest line in all of football in 2015, to include the NFL. His lines paved the way for two different running backs, Jonathan Williams and Alex Collins, to rush for over 1,000 yards during his three years as the O-Line position coach.

Pittman departed Arkansas after the 2015 season to become offensive line coach at the University of Georgia under new head coach Kirby Smart and offensive coordinator Jim Chaney, with whom Pittman had previously worked at Tennessee and Arkansas. Georgia paid a $250,000 buyout to hire Pittman. When Pittman informed Bielema that he planned to take the Georgia job, Bielema brought several Arkansas offensive linemen to Pittman's house to attempt to convince him to remain at Arkansas. Bielema claimed that Pittman had refused to meet personally with his players to inform them he would be leaving, a claim that Pittman denied.

At Georgia, Pittman garnered a reputation as "one of the best recruiters and offensive line coaches in the SEC." In his second season, Georgia won the SEC Championship Game and reached the College Football Playoff National Championship. That was the first of three consecutive Southeastern Conference East Division titles for Georgia from 2017 to 2019. Pittman's 2018 line was named a finalist for the Joe Moore Award for the best offensive line in college football. Pittman was promoted to associate head coach in 2019, with a salary of $900,000 per year making him the highest-paid offensive line coach in the NCAA Division I Football Bowl Subdivision. Off the field, he became known for a catchphrase, "Yesssirrrr!", that he would use in social-media videos posted after Georgia secured commitments from significant recruits, beginning with quarterback Justin Fields in 2017.

=== Head coach ===
On December 8, 2019, Pittman was announced as the new head coach at Arkansas, replacing Chad Morris. Several of Pittman's former players lobbied for him to get the job, including writing an open letter to Arkansas administrators shortly after Morris's firing. Pittman's hiring was announced on Twitter by athletic director Hunter Yurachek, including a video of Pittman and Yurachek bellowing Pittman's trademark ""Yessir!"

In Pittman's second game as the head coach, Arkansas upset #16 Mississippi State, snapping a 20-game SEC losing streak. Arkansas would finish with a 3-7 record in an all-SEC schedule, and would receive an invite to play in the Texas Bowl against TCU, though the game was cancelled due to COVID-19 issues.

The 2021 season represented further rapid improvement for the Razorbacks. Arkansas would upset #15 Texas at home, resulting in the Razorbacks being ranked in the top 25 for the first time in four years. Two weeks later, Arkansas beat #7 Texas A&M, starting the season 4-0 and being ranked in the top 10. Arkansas would finish the regular season 8-4, including their first wins against both LSU and Missouri in five years. This was only the second time in 10 years that Arkansas had won 8 or more games in a season. 2021 marked the first time in school history that Arkansas won all three trophy rivalry games in the same season, winning the Southwest Classic trophy against Texas A&M, the Golden Boot Trophy against LSU, and the Battle Line Rivalry Trophy over Missouri. Arkansas received an invite to the 2022 Outback Bowl, in which they beat Penn State 24-10, their first bowl victory since 2015.

Arkansas entered 2022 under Pittman ranked #19 in the AP poll despite losing significant talent to the NFL, including first-round wide receiver Treylon Burks. Arkansas would open their season with wins over #23 Cincinnati, South Carolina, and Missouri State, whose head coach was former Razorback head coach Bobby Petrino, rising as high as #10 in the AP poll before losing three straight games. Arkansas would be upset by Liberty, but notched a signature win over #14 Ole Miss, and ultimately finished the season 6-6. Arkansas faced Kansas in the 2022 Liberty Bowl, resulting in a 55-53 triple overtime win.

After the 2022 season, Arkansas would lose both coordinators; offensive coordinator Kendal Briles left for the same position at TCU, and defensive coordinator Barry Odom became the head coach at UNLV. Additionally, Pittman fired strength and conditioning coach Jamil Walker, while parting ways with defensive backs coach Dominique Bowman, tight ends coach Dowell Loggains, and linebackers coach Michael Scherer. Arkansas would start the 2023 season 2-0, but would then lose six straight games, resulting in the firing of offensive coordinator Dan Enos. Arkansas won their first-ever game in Gainesville, beating Florida 39-36, but would finish the season 4-8 and would miss a bowl game for the first time under Pittman.

Five days after the 2023 season ended, on November 29, 2023, Pittman hired former Razorback head coach Bobby Petrino as offensive coordinator. OL coach Cody Kennedy left for the same job at Mississippi State, and on December 4, 2023, Pittman hired Baylor OL coach Eric Mateos. On December 26, 2023, wide receivers coach Kenny Guiton left Arkansas to be the WR coach at Wisconsin, and Pittman hired Missouri State co-OC Ronnie Fouch as the new wide receivers coach on January 7, 2024. On March 10, 2024, running backs coach Jimmy Smith left for the same position at TCU. Pittman hired Miami Dolphins assistant coach Kolby Smith as his new RB coach on March 12, 2024, mostly on the recommendation of Petrino, who Smith played for at Louisville as a RB from 2003 to 2006. After the season, incumbent starting quarterback KJ Jefferson entered the transfer portal and left the program.

The 2024 season under Pittman was highlighted by incoming transfer quarterback Taylen Green. Arkansas would start the season 3-2, featuring close losses against #16 Oklahoma State and #24 Texas A&M. The Razorbacks upset #4 Tennessee 19-14, their first win against a top 5 opponent since 2007. Arkansas finished the 2024 regular season 6-6. Wide receiver Andrew Armstrong became only the fifth player in team history with over 1,000 yards receiving in a season. Arkansas was invited to the Liberty Bowl against Texas Tech, which they won 39-26.

The 2025 season featured the return of Green at quarterback and high expectations for the team. Arkansas started the season 2-0, but would lose to Ole Miss and Group of 5 opponent Memphis. On September 28, 2025, the day after a blowout 56-13 loss at home against Notre Dame, Pittman was fired.

Offensive coordinator Bobby Petrino took over as interim head coach after Pittman's firing. Arkansas would not win another game in 2025, finishing with a 2-10 record. Memphis head coach Ryan Silverfield was hired as Pittman's replacement on November 30, 2025.

While at Arkansas, Pittman compiled a cumulative 32-34 record, a 14-29 conference record, and a 3-0 record in bowl games.

== Personal life ==
Pittman is married to his wife, Jamie. They have no children. Pittman is close friends with his former colleague Rex Ryan. Ryan (who according to Pittman is "not handy") once flew Pittman out to his home to help build a children's fort that Ryan had designed:

An effective coach was a person skilled at getting talented people to do things for him. After Ryan designed "the biggest kids' fort in the world!" for his two sons to play on in their Maryland backyard, a round-trip airplane ticket was purchased for Sam Pittman. Upon arrival, Pittman was presented with a three-level drawing made in Ryan's hand. The two men went out to the yard, and while Pittman measured and sawed, Ryan was right there beside him telling stories about tornadoes, making work seem like fun.

— Nicholas Dawidoff, Collision Low Crossers: A Year Inside the Turbulent World of NFL Football (2013)

== Head coaching record ==
=== Junior college ===
Year	Team	Overall	Conference	Standing	Bowl/playoffs
Hutchinson Blue Dragons (Kansas Jayhawk Community College Conference) (1992–1993)
1992	Hutchinson	5–4–1	2–3–1	5th	L KJCCC first round
1993	Hutchinson	6–5	4–2	3rd	L KJCCC semifinal, L Valley of the Sun Bowl
Hutchinson:		11–9–1	6–5–1		
Total:		11–9–1			

=== College ===
Year	Team	Overall	Conference	Standing	Bowl/playoffs	Coaches^{#}	AP^{°}
Arkansas Razorbacks (Southeastern Conference) (2020–2025)
2020	Arkansas	3–7	3–7	T–6th (Western)	Texas (Note: The 2020 Texas Bowl was canceled due to COVID-19 and ruled a no contest.)		
2021	Arkansas	9–4	4–4	T–3rd (Western)	W Outback	20	21
2022	Arkansas	7–6	3–5	5th (Western)	W Liberty		
2023	Arkansas	4–8	1–7	T–6th (Western)			
2024	Arkansas	7–6	3–5	T–11th	W Liberty		
2025	Arkansas	2–3 (Note: Arkansas fired Pittman after five games.)	0–1				
Arkansas:		32–34	14–29				
Total:		32–34					
^{#}Rankings from final Coaches Poll.; ^{°}Rankings from final AP Poll.
