= 2022 Outback Bowl =

Postseason college football bowl game

- 36th Outback Bowl
Penn State Nittany Lions	Arkansas Razorbacks
(7–5)	(8–4)
Big Ten	SEC
10	24
Head coach: James Franklin	Head coach: Sam Pittman
	AP / Coaches / CFP; 22 / 24 / 21
	1	2	3	4	Total
Penn State	0	10	0	0	10
Arkansas	7	0	17	0	24
- Date: January 1, 2022
- Season: 2021
- Stadium: Raymond James Stadium
- Location: Tampa, Florida
- MVP: KJ Jefferson (QB, Arkansas)
- Favorite: Arkansas by 2.5
- Referee: Tuta Salaam (Big 12)
- Halftime show: Razorback Marching Band, Penn State Blue Band
- Attendance: 46,577

United States TV coverage
- Network: ESPN2
- Announcers: Dave Flemming (play-by-play), Rod Gilmore (analyst), and Stormy Buonantony (sideline)

The 2022 Outback Bowl was a college football bowl game played on January 1, 2022, with kickoff at 12:00 p.m. EST and televised on ESPN2. It was the 36th edition and the 26th and final one branded by Outback Steakhouse, of the Outback Bowl, and was one of the 2021–22 bowl games concluding the 2021 FBS football season. Outback Steakhouse was the game's title sponsor. The game featured the Arkansas Razorbacks of the SEC and the Penn State Nittany Lions of the Big Ten. Arkansas pulled away in the second half, scoring 17 unanswered points in the 3rd quarter, to win the game, 24-10. Arkansas Razorback QB K.J. Jefferson was named the game's MVP. Penn State fell to 7-6 for the season, while Arkansas improved to 9-4.

== Teams ==
Consistent with conference tie-ins, the game was played between teams from the Southeastern Conference (SEC) and Big Ten Conference. The bowl also has a tie-in with the Atlantic Coast Conference (ACC) if the ACC's opponent in the Orange Bowl is a Big Ten team, in which case an ACC team is selected for the Outback Bowl.

This was the first time that Arkansas and Penn State had ever played each other.

== Game summary ==
2022 Outback Bowl

Quarter	1	2	3	4	Total
Penn State	0	10	0	0	10
No. 21 Arkansas	7	0	17	0	24

at Raymond James Stadium • Tampa, Florida

- Date: Saturday, January 1, 2022
- Game time: 12:00 p.m. EST
- Game attendance: 46,577
- Referee: Tuta Salaam
- TV announcers (ESPN2): Dave Flemming (play-by-play), Rod Gilmore (analyst), and Stormy Buonantony (sideline)
- Box score

Scoring summary

Quarter	Time	Drive			Team	Scoring information	Score	
Quarter	Time	Plays	Yards	TOP	Team	Scoring information	Penn State	Arkansas
1	0:00	12	61	5:42	Arkansas	Raheim Sanders 3-yard touchdown run, Cam Little kick good	0	7
2	10:53	1	42	0:07	Penn State	KeAndre Lambert-Smith 42-yard touchdown reception from Sean Clifford, Jake Pinegar kick good	7	7
2	5:19	7	61	2:40	Penn State	33-yard field goal by Jake Pinegar	10	7
3	12:42	7	75	2:18	Arkansas	KJ Jefferson 8-yard touchdown run, Cam Little kick good	10	14
3	6:29	10	46	4:32	Arkansas	36-yard field goal by Cam Little	10	17
3	2:08	4	79	1:38	Arkansas	Raheim Sanders 1-yard touchdown run, Cam Little kick good	10	24
"TOP" = time of possession. For other American football terms, see Glossary of American football.							10	24

Game MVP - Arkansas QB K.J. Jefferson, 14 of 19 - 98 yards - 1 INT, 20 carries 110 yards 1 TD.

== Statistics ==
=== Team statistics ===
Team statistical comparison
Statistic	Penn State	Arkansas
First downs	17	25
First downs rushing	8	21
First downs passing	8	3
First downs penalty	1	1
Third down efficiency	6–15	4–14
Fourth down efficiency	1–2	3–3
Total plays–net yards	63–323	78–451
Rushing attempts–net yards	28–125	58–361
Yards per rush	4.5	6.2
Yards passing	198	90
Pass completions–attempts	15–35	14–20
Interceptions thrown	2	2
Punt returns–total yards	2–23	1–8
Kickoff returns–total yards	0–0	0–0
Punts–average yardage	5–39.4	5–44.4
Fumbles–lost	1–0	1–0
Penalties–yards	3–10	6–40
Time of possession	23:47	36:13

=== Individual statistics ===
Penn State statistics
Nittany Lions passing
	C–A	Yds	TD–INT
Sean Clifford	14–32	195	1–2
Christian Veilleux	1–2	3	0–0
Jordan Stout	0–1	0	0–0
Nittany Lions rushing
	Car	Yds	TD
Sean Clifford	12	46	0
Keyvone Lee	4	35	0
Noah Cain	5	28	0
Parker Washington	2	12	0
Devyn Ford	1	4	0
Christian Veilleux	2	3	0
TEAM	2	−3	0
Nittany Lions receiving
	Rec	Yds	TD
Parker Washington	7	98	0
KeAndre Lambert-Smith	3	1	
Keyvone Lee	1	15	0
Noah Cain	2	12	0
Tyler Warren	1	0	0
Brenton Strange	1	−1	0

Arkansas statistics
Razorbacks passing
	C–A	Yds	TD–INT
KJ Jefferson	14–19	98	0–1
Warren Thompson	0–1	0	0–1
Razorbacks rushing
	Car	Yds	TD
KJ Jefferson	20	110	1
Raheim Sanders	13	79	2
Dominique Johnson	11	77	0
Malik Hornsby	4	67	0
AJ Green	4	26	0
Trelon Smith	2	6	0
TEAM	2	−6	0
De'Vion Warren	2	−6	0
Razorbacks receiving
	Rec	Yds	TD
De'Vion Warren	3	33	0
Tyson Morris	3	32	0
Warren Thompson	1	12	0
Trey Knox	2	11	0
Blake Kern	1	8	0
Bryce Stephens	3	5	0
Dominique Johnson	1	−3	0
