= 2022 Missouri Tigers football team =

American college football season

2022 Missouri Tigers football

Gasparilla Bowl, L 17–27 vs. Wake Forest
- Conference: Southeastern Conference
- Eastern Division
- Record: 6–7 (3–5 SEC)
- Head coach: Eliah Drinkwitz (3rd season)
- Offensive scheme: Multiple
- Defensive coordinator: Blake Baker (1st season)
- Co-defensive coordinator: D. J. Smith (1st season)
- Base defense: 4–3
- Home stadium: Faurot Field

2022 Southeastern Conference football standings
	Conf.			Overall
Team	W		L	W		L
Eastern Division
No. 1 Georgia xy$#^	8	–	0	15	–	0
No. 6 Tennessee	6	–	2	11	–	2
No. 23 South Carolina	4	–	4	8	–	5
Kentucky	3	–	5	7	–	6
Florida	3	–	5	6	–	7
Missouri	3	–	5	6	–	7
Vanderbilt	2	–	6	5	–	7
Western Division
No. 16 LSU xy	6	–	2	10	–	4
No. 5 Alabama x	6	–	2	11	–	2
No. 20 Mississippi State	4	–	4	9	–	4
Ole Miss	4	–	4	8	–	5
Arkansas	3	–	5	7	–	6
Auburn	2	–	6	5	–	7
Texas A&M	2	–	6	5	–	7
Championship: Georgia 50, LSU 30
# – College Football Playoff champion; ^ – College Football Playoff participant; $ – Conference champion; x – Division champion/co-champions; y – Championship game participant; Rankings from AP Poll

The 2022 Missouri Tigers football team represented the University of Missouri in the 2022 NCAA Division I FBS football season. The Tigers played their home games at Faurot Field in Columbia, Missouri, and competed in the Eastern Division of the Southeastern Conference (SEC). They were led by third-year head coach Eliah Drinkwitz.

== Offseason ==
=== Recruiting ===
The Tigers signed the #15 ranked recruiting class (according to Rivals) prior to the 2022 season, headlined by wide receiver Luther Burden III from East St. Louis, Illinois and quarterback Sam Horn from Suwanee, Georgia.

Name	Position	Hometown	High school / college	Height	Weight	Commit date
Luther Burden III	Wide receiver	East St. Louis, IL	East St. Louis	6'2"	205 lbs.	October 19, 2021
Sam Horn	Quarterback	Suwanee, GA	Collins Hill	6'3"	180 lbs.	February 28, 2021
DJ Wesolak	Defensive end	Boonville, MO	Boonville	6'5"	225 lbs.	December 15, 2021
Tavorus Jones	Running back	El Paso, TX	Burges	5'11"	205 lbs.	July 2, 2021
Armand Membou	Offensive guard	Lee's Summit, MO	Lee's Summit North	6'5"	305 lbs.	March 27, 2021

== Schedule ==
Missouri and the SEC announced the 2022 football schedule on September 21, 2021.

Date	Time	Opponent	Site	TV	Result	Attendance
September 1	7:00 p.m.	Louisiana Tech*	Faurot Field; Columbia, MO	ESPNU	W 52–24	47,653
September 10	11:00 a.m.	at Kansas State*	Bill Snyder Family Football Stadium; Manhattan, KS	ESPN2	L 12–40	51,806
September 17	11:00 a.m.	Abilene Christian*	Faurot Field; Columbia, MO	SECN+/ESPN+	W 34–17	53,253
September 24	11:00 a.m.	at Auburn	Jordan–Hare Stadium; Auburn, AL	ESPN	L 14–17 ^{OT}	85,750
October 1	6:30 p.m.	No. 1 Georgia	Faurot Field; Columbia, MO	SECN	L 22–26	58,165
October 8	11:00 a.m.	at Florida	Ben Hill Griffin Stadium; Gainesville, FL	ESPNU	L 17–24	88,471
October 22	3:00 p.m.	Vanderbilt^{†}	Faurot Field; Columbia, MO	SECN	W 17–14	60,618
October 29	3:00 p.m.	at No. 25 South Carolina	Williams–Brice Stadium; Columbia, SC (Mayor's Cup)	SECN	W 23–10	77,578
November 5	11:00 a.m.	Kentucky	Faurot Field; Columbia, MO	SECN	L 17–21	61,047
November 12	11:00 a.m.	at No. 5 Tennessee	Neyland Stadium; Knoxville, TN	CBS	L 24–66	101,915
November 19	6:00 p.m.	New Mexico State*	Faurot Field; Columbia, MO	ESPNU	W 45–14	45,231
November 25	2:30 p.m.	Arkansas	Faurot Field; Columbia, MO (Battle Line Rivalry)	CBS	W 29–27	55,710
December 23	5:30 p.m.	vs. Wake Forest*	Raymond James Stadium; Tampa, FL (Gasparilla Bowl)	ESPN	L 17–27	34,370
*Non-conference game; ^{†}Homecoming; Rankings from AP Poll (and CFP Rankings, after November 1) - Released prior to game; All times are in Central time

== Personnel ==
=== Coaching staff ===
Name	Position	Seasons at Missouri	Alma mater
Eliah Drinkwitz	Head Coach	3	Arkansas Tech (2004)
Al Pogue	Defensive backs	1	Alabama State (1996)
Blake Baker	Defensive coordinator/safeties	1	Tulane (2004)
Erik Link	Special teams coordinator/tight ends	3	Drake (2003)
Al Davis	Defensive line (Interior)	2	Arkansas (2012)
Bush Hamdan	Quarterbacks	3	Boise State (2008)
Jacob Peeler	Wide receivers	1	Louisiana Tech (2007)
Aaron Fletcher	Secondary	2	Texas A&M (1999)
Marcus Johnson	Offensive line/run game coordinator/assistant head coach	3	Ole Miss (2004)
Curtis Luper	Running backs	3	Stephen F. Austin (1996)
Kevin Peoples	Defensive line (Edge)	1	Carroll College (1992)
D. J. Smith	Co-defensive coordinator/linebackers/recruiting coordinator	3	Appalachian State (2010)
Andy Lutz	Director of football operations	3	Pacific (1991)
Zac Woodfin	Director of Athletic Performance	3	UAB (2004)

=== Roster ===
2022 Missouri Tigers football team roster
Players
Coaches
Offense

Pos.	#	Name	Class
RB	0	BJ Harris	So
WR	1	Tauskie Dove	Sr
WR	2	Chance Luper	So
WR	3	Luther Burden III	Fr
RB	4	Elijah Young	Jr
WR	5	Mookie Cooper	So
QB	6	Tyler Macon	Fr
WR	7	Dominic Lovett	So
RB	8	Nathaniel Peat	Sr
WR	10	Mekhi Miller	Fr
WR	11	Barrett Banister	GS
QB	12	Brady Cook	So
QB	14	Brett Brown	Fr
QB	15	Tommy Lock	Fr
QB	16	Jack Abraham	GS
RB	17	Taj Butts	Fr
WR	18	Demariyon Houston	Jr
RB	20	Cody Schrader	Sr
QB	21	Sam Horn	Fr
RB	22	Tavorus Jones	Fr
RB	31	Anthony Favrow	Fr
RB	33	Bryce Jackson	Fr
RB	35	Michael Cox	So
RB	38	Christopher Kreh	Fr
TE	40	Damon Johanns	Fr
WR	41	Zach Hahn	Fr
TE	45	Kibet Chepyator	GS
OL	50	Hyrin White	GS
OL	51	Zeke Powell	GS
OL	53	Dylan Spencer	So
OL	54	Luke Griffin	Jr
OL	55	Connor Tollison	Fr
OL	58	Makyi Lee	Jr
OL	61	Richard Taylor	Sr
OL	62	Bence Polgar	Jr
OL	63	Isaac Zatechka	Fr
OL	64	Bobby Lawrence	Sr
OL	65	Trenton Sederwall	Jr
OL	66	Connor Wood	GS
OL	67	Xavier Machado	Fr
OL	68	Jack McGarry	Fr
OL	69	Drake Heismeyer	So
OL	70	EJ Ndoma-Ogar	So
OL	71	Valen Erickson	Fr
OL	72	Xavier Delgado	Sr
OL	73	Tristan Wilson	Fr
OL	75	Mitchell Walters	So
OL	76	Javon Foster	Sr
OL	79	Armand Membou	Fr
TE	80	Tyler Stephens	Jr
TE	81	Shawn Hendershot	So
WR	82	Logan Kuckey	Fr
TE	84	Ryan Hoestkamp	Fr
TE	87	Gavin McKay	Fr
TE	88	Max Whisner	Fr
WR	89	Micah Manning	So

Defense

Pos.	#	Name	Class
DL	0	Jayden Jernigan	Sr
DB	1	Jaylon Carlies	Jr
DB	2	Ennis Rakestraw Jr.	So
DB	3	Martez Manuel	Sr
DB	4	Jalani Williams	Jr
DL	5	Tyrone Hopper	GS
DL	6	Darius Robinson	Sr
DL	7	DJ Coleman	GS
LB	8	Ty'Ron Hopper	Jr
DL	9	Isaiah McGuire	Sr
LB	10	Dameon Wilson	Fr
LB	11	Devin Nicholson	Sr
DB	12	DJ Jackson	So
DB	13	Daylan Carnell	Fr
DB	14	Kris Abrams-Draine	Jr
DL	15	Johnny Walker Jr.	So
DL	16	Travion Ford	Fr
DB	17	Tyler Hibbler	Fr
DL	18	Trajan Jeffcoat	Sr
DB	19	Dreyden Norwood	Fr
DB	20	LJ Hewitt	So
DB	21	Tyler Jones	So
LB	22	Will Norris	So
DB	24	Marcus Scott II	Fr
DB	25	Ja'Marion Wayne	Fr
LB	26	Xavier Simmons	Fr
DB	28	Joseph Charleston	Jr
DB	29	Justin Efebera	Jr
LB	30	Chuck Hicks	Sr
LB	31	Zach Lovett	Fr
DL	32	Ky Montgomery	Fr
LB	33	Chad Bailey	Sr
DB	34	Davion Sistrunk	Fr
DB	35	Jarrin McKeithen	Sr
DB	36	Devyn Butler	Jr
DB	39	Caimin Hayes	So
LB	41	Carmycah Glass	Fr
DB	43	Boyton Cheney	Fr
DB	43	Isaac Thompson	Fr
DL	45	DJ Wesolak	Fr
LB	52	Vic Garrido	Fr
DL	55	Arden Walker	Fr
LB	56	Nate Norris	Fr
DL	81	Jack Meyer	Fr
DL	88	Jason Skivers	Fr
DL	90	Josh Landry	Sr
DL	91	Ian Mathews	Fr
DL	92	Kristian Williams	Jr
DL	93	Andrew Serrano	So
DL	94	Marquis Gracial	Fr
DL	97	Daniel Robledo	Jr
DL	95	Jalen Marshall	Fr
DL	99	Realus George Jr.	Sr

Special teams

Pos.	#	Name	Class
LS	47	Daniel Hawthorne	Jr
LS	49	Jake Hoffman	Sr
K	90	Sean Koetting	GS
K	92	Harrison Mevis	Jr
K	93	Luke Bauer	So
K	96	Nick Quadrini	Fr
P	97	Jack Stonehouse	Fr

Head coach

- Eliah Drinkwitz

Coordinators/assistant coaches

- Marcus Johnson – Associate head coach/Run game coordinator/offensive line
- Blake Baker – Defensive coordinator/safeties
- D. J. Smith – Co-defensive coordintor/linebackers/recruiting coordinator
- Erik Link – Special teams coordinator/tight ends
- Al Davis – Interior-defensive line
- Bush Hamdan – Quarterbacks
- Curtis Luper – Running backs
- Jacob Peeler – Wide receivers
- Kevin Peoples – Edge-defensive line
- Al Pogue – Cornerbacks

Legend

- (C) Team captain
- (S) Suspended
- (I) Ineligible
- Injured
- Redshirt

Roster
Last update: August 26, 2022

== Game summaries ==
=== vs Louisiana Tech ===
Uniform Combination
Helmet	Jersey	Pants

Game One – Louisiana Tech Bulldogs vs Missouri Tigers

Quarter	1	2	3	4	Total
Bulldogs	3	7	0	14	24
Tigers	0	24	14	14	52

at Faurot Field • Columbia, Missouri

- Date: Thursday, September 1, 2022
- Game time: 7:00 p.m. CDT
- Game weather: Sunny • Temperature: 87 °F (31 °C)
- Game attendance: 47,653
- Referee: David Smith
- TV announcers (ESPNU): Mike Monaco (play-by-play), Dave Steckel (analyst)

Statistics	LT	MIZ
First downs	19	28
Total yards	347	558
Rushing yards	11	323
Passing yards	336	235
Turnovers	3	2
Time of possession	28:28	31:32

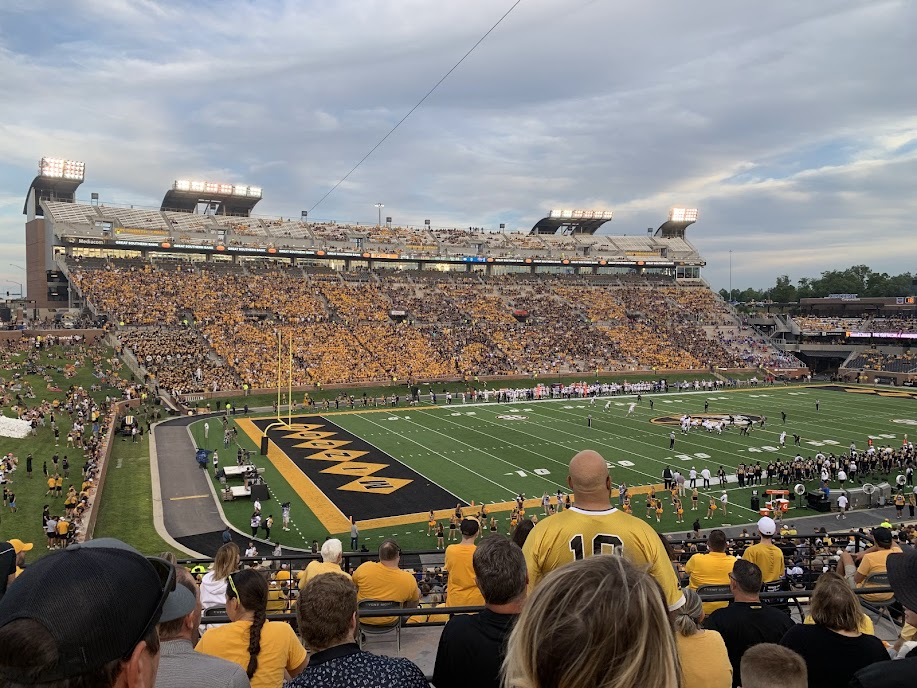
Faurot Field during the game vs Louisiana Tech

Team	Category	Player	Statistics
Louisiana Tech	Passing	Matthew Downing	20/35, 194 yards, TD, 3 INT
Louisiana Tech	Rushing	Marquis Crosby	7 rushes, 23 yards
Louisiana Tech	Receiving	Cyrus Allen	5 receptions, 121 yards, 2 TD
Missouri	Passing	Brady Cook	18/27, 201 yards, TD, INT
Missouri	Rushing	Nathaniel Peat	8 rushes, 72 yards, TD
Missouri	Receiving	Dominic Lovett	6 receptions, 76 yards

=== At Kansas State ===
Uniform Combination
Helmet	Jersey	Pants

Game Two – Kansas State Wildcats vs Missouri Tigers

Quarter	1	2	3	4	Total
Tigers	3	0	3	6	12
Wildcats	7	13	6	14	40

at Bill Snyder Family Stadium • Manhattan, Kansas

- Date: Saturday, September 10, 2022
- Game time: 11:15 a.m. CDT
- Game weather: Rainy • Temperature: 65 °F (18 °C) • Wind: N 10 MPH
- Game attendance: 51,806
- Referee: James Carter
- TV announcers (ESPN2): Mike Monaco (play-by-play), Dave Steckel (analyst)

Game information

First quarter

- (9:20) Missouri – Harrison Mevis 49-yard field goal (Drive: 11 plays, 44 yards, 5:40; Missouri 3–0)
- (4:16) Kansas State – Deuce Vaughn 1-yard run, Chris Tennant kick (Drive: 11 plays, 75 yards, 4:58; Kansas State 7–3)

Second quarter

- (13:29) Kansas State – Adrian Martinez 16-yard run, Chris Tennant kick (Drive: 10 plays, 49 yards, 4:22; Kansas State 14–3)
- (6:42) Kansas State – Phillip Brooks 76-yard punt return, Chris Tennant kick blocked (Kansas State 20–3)

Third quarter

- (10:17) Missouri – Harrison Mevis 44-yard field goal (Drive: 8 plays, 54 yards, 2:16; Kansas 20–6)
- (6:58) Kansas State – Chris Tennant 35-yard field goal (Drive: 6 plays, 16 yards, 2:22; Kansas State 23–6)
- (0:35) Kansas State – Chris Tennant 37-yard field goal (Drive: 4 plays, 0 yards, 1:20; Kansas State 26–6)

Fourth quarter

- (12:52) Kansas State – Deuce Vaughn 24-yard run, Chris Tennant kick (Drive: 4 plays, 59 yards, 2:02; Kansas State 33–6)
- (2:33) Kansas State – DJ Giddens 28-yard run, Chris Tennant kick (Drive: 10 plays, 63 yards, 6:46; Kansas State 40–6)
- (0:00) Missouri – Cody Schrader 1-yard run, no attempted kick (Drive: 6 plays, 20 yards, 1:10; Kansas State 40–12)

Statistics	Missouri	Kansas State
First downs	14	18
Total yards	222	336
Rushes/yards	35/94	43/235
Passing yards	128	101
Passing: Comp–Att–Int	15–31–4	9–20–0
Turnovers	4	1
Time of possession	27:59	32:01
Penalties−yards	8−46	8−68

Team	Category	Player	Statistics
Missouri	Passing	Brady Cook	15/27, 128 YDS, 2 INT
Missouri	Rushing	Brady Cook	13 CAR, 56 YDS, 11 Long
Missouri	Receiving	Dominic Lovett	3 REC, 66 YDS, 39 Long
Kansas State	Passing	Adrian Martinez	9/20, 101 YDS
Kansas State	Rushing	Deuce Vaughn	24 CAR, 145 YDS, 2 TD, 29 Long
Kansas State	Receiving	Phillip Brooks	3 REC, 57 yards, 28 Long

=== vs Abilene Christian (FCS) ===
	1	2	3	4	Total
Wildcats (FCS)	3	0	7	7	17
Tigers	14	3	14	3	34

=== At Auburn ===
Missouri Tigers (2–1) at Auburn Tigers (2–1)

Quarter	1	2	3	4	OT	Total
Missouri Tigers	0	14	0	0	0	14
Auburn Tigers	14	0	0	0	3	17

at Jordan–Hare Stadium • Auburn, Alabama

- Date: Saturday, September 24, 2022
- Game time: 11:07 a.m. CDT
- Game weather: Sunny • Temperature: 76 °F (24 °C) • Wind: SE 4 mph
- Game attendance: 85,750
- Referee: Jason Autrey
- TV announcers (ESPN): Mark Jones (play-by-play), Robert Griffin III (analyst), Quint Kessenich (sideline reporter)

Statistics	MU	AUB
First downs	13	15
Plays–yards	63–312	66–217
Rushes–yards	39–133	45–82
Passing yards	179	135
Passing: comp–att–int	14–24–1	14–21–0
Turnovers		
Time of possession	27:18	32:42

Team	Category	Player	Statistics
Missouri	Passing	Brady Cook	14/24, 179 yds, 1 INT
Missouri	Rushing	Nathaniel Peat	20 carries, 110 yds
Missouri	Receiving	Dominic Lovett	5 receptions, 102 yds
Auburn	Passing	Robby Ashford	12/18, 127 yds
Auburn	Rushing	Robby Ashford	15 carries, 46 yds
Auburn	Receiving	Koy Moore	4 receptions, 74 yds

=== No. 1 Georgia ===
Uniform Combination
Helmet	Jersey	Pants

No. 1 Georgia Bulldogs (4–0) vs. Missouri Tigers (2–2)

Quarter	1	2	3	4	Total
Missouri	3	13	3	3	22
No. 1 Georgia	0	6	6	14	26

at Faurot Field • Columbia, Missouri

- Date: Saturday, October 1, 2022
- Game time: 7:30 p.m. EST
- Game weather: Clear • Temperature: - • Wind:
- Game attendance: 58,165
- Referee: Matt Loeffler
- TV announcers (SEC Network): Tom Hart (play-by-play), Jordan Rodgers (color) and Cole Cubelic (sideline)

Game information

First quarter

- (4:11) MIZ – Harrison Mevis 41 Yd Field Goal (Missouri 3–0)

Second quarter

- (12:43) MIZ – Tyler Stephens 10 Yd pass from Brady Cook (Harrison Mevis Kick) (Missouri 10–0)
- (8:53) MIZ – Harrison Mevis 49 Yd Field Goal (Missouri 13–0)
- (6:36) KENT – Jack Podlesny 40 Yd Field Goal (Missouri 13–3)
- (3:16) MIZ – Harrison Mevis 22 Yd Field Goal (Missouri 16–3)
- (0:00) UGA – Jack Podlesny 34 Yd Field Goal (Missouri 16–6)

Third quarter

- (5:53) UGA – Jack Podlesny 28 Yd Field Goal (Missouri 16–9)
- (4:31) MIZ – Harrison Mevis 52 Yd Field Goal (Missouri 19–9)
- (2:15) UGA – Jack Podlesny 29 Yd Field Goal (Missouri 19–12)

Fourth quarter

- (14:09) MIZ – Harrison Mevis 56 Yd Field Goal (Missouri 22–12)
- (9:39) UGA – Kendall Milton 1 Yd Run (Jack Podlesny Kick) (Missouri 22–19)
- (4:03) UGA – Daijun Edwards 1 Yd Run (Jack Podlesny Kick) (Georgia 26–22)

Statistics	UGA	MIZ
First downs	28	14
Plays–yards	79–481	53–294
Rushes–yards	169	102
Passing yards	312	192
Passing: comp–att–int	24–43	20–32
Turnovers		
Time of possession	34:48	25:12

Team	Category	Player	Statistics
Georgia	Passing	Stetson Bennett	24/43, 312 yards
Georgia	Rushing	Kenny McIntosh	11 carries, 65 yards
Georgia	Receiving	Brock Bowers	5 receptions, 66 yards
Missouri	Passing	Brady Cook	20/32, 192 yards, 1 TD
Missouri	Rushing	Cody Schrader	6 carries, 89 yards
Missouri	Receiving	Dominic Lovett	6 receptions, 84 yards

=== At Florida ===
Missouri Tigers (2–3) at Florida Gators (3–2) – Game summary

Quarter	1	2	3	4	Total
Missouri	0	10	0	7	17
Florida	10	0	7	7	24

at Ben Hill Griffin Stadium • Gainesville, FL

- Date: October 8, 2022
- Game time: 12:00 p.m.
- Game weather: Temperature: 82 °F (28 °C) • Wind: N at 3 miles per hour (4.8 km/h) • Weather: Sunny
- Game attendance: 88,471
- Referee: David Smith
- TV announcers (ESPNU): John Schriffen (play-by-play), Dustin Fox (color) and Lauren Sisler (sideline reporter)
- Boxscore

Game information

First quarter

- Florida – Adam Mihalek 37-yard field goal, 2:58
- Florida – Jaydon Hill 49-yard interception return (Adam Mihalek kick), 1:01

Second quarter

- Missouri – Cody Schrader 6-yard run (Harrison Melvis kick), 3:55
- Missouri – Harrison Melvis 28-yard field goal, 0:20

Third quarter

- Florida – Montrell Johnson Jr. 3-yard run (Adam Mihalek kick), 6:55

Fourth quarter

- Florida – Ricky Pearsall 9-yard pass from Anthony Richardson (Adam Mihalek kick), 11:10
- Missouri – Nathaniel Peat 18-yard run (Harrison Mevis kick), 5:58

Passing leaders

- Missouri – Brady Cook – 22/30, 220 yards, 2 interceptions
- Florida – Anthony Richardson – 8/14, 66 yards, 1 touchdown, 1 interception

Rushing leaders

- Missouri – Nathaniel Peat – 20 carries, 117 yards, 1 touchdown
- Florida – Montrell Johnson Jr. – 8 carries, 86 yards, 1 touchdown

Receiving leaders

- Missouri – Mookie Cooper – 4 receptions, 58 yards
- Florida – Justin Shorter – 1 reception, 20 yards

Tackling leaders

- Missouri – Isaiah McGuire – 7 tackles
- Florida – Ventrell Miller – 11 tackles

=== vs Vanderbilt ===
	1	2	3	4	Total
Commodores	0	0	7	7	14
Tigers	7	10	0	0	17

Statistics

Statistics	VAN	MIZ
First downs	16	19
Total yards	299	308
Rushing yards	57	97
Passing yards	242	211
Turnovers	1	4
Time of possession	31:03	28:57

Team	Category	Player	Statistics
Vanderbilt	Passing	Mike Wright	9/15, 127 yards, TD
Vanderbilt	Rushing	Ray Davis	15 rushes, 28 yards
Vanderbilt	Receiving	Gamarion Carter	1 reception, 80 yards, TD
Missouri	Passing	Brady Cook	17/25, 211 yards, TD, INT
Missouri	Rushing	Cody Schrader	14 rushes, 84 yards
Missouri	Receiving	Luther Burden III	4 receptions, 66 yards, TD

=== At No. 25 South Carolina ===
	1	2	3	4	Total
Tigers	7	10	3	3	23
No. 25 Gamecocks	0	7	3	0	10

=== vs Kentucky ===
Uniform Combination
Helmet	Jersey	Pants

Kentucky Wildcats (5–3) at Missouri Tigers (4–4) – Game summary

Quarter	1	2	3	4	Total
Kentucky	7	0	7	7	21
Missouri	3	0	0	14	17

at Faurot Field • Columbia, Missouri

- Date: November 5, 2022
- Game time: 11:00 a.m.
- Game weather: Cloudy • Temperature: 45 °F (7 °C) • Wind: NE @ 19 mph
- Game attendance: 61,047
- Referee: Steve Marlowe
- TV announcers (SEC Network): Jay Alter (play-by-play), Dustin Fox (color) and Lauren Sisler (sideline)

Statistics	Kentucky	Missouri
First downs	15	12
Total yards	252	232
Rushing yards	82	89
Passing yards	170	143
Turnovers	0	2
Time of possession	31:05	28:55

Team	Category	Player	Statistics
Kentucky	Passing	Will Levis	13/19, 170 yards, 3 TD’s
Kentucky	Rushing	Chris Rodriguez Jr.	29 carries, 112 yards
Kentucky	Receiving	Barion Brown	4 receptions, 54 yards
Missouri	Passing	Brady Cook	18/26, 143 yards
Missouri	Rushing	Cody Schrader	21 carries, 65 yards
Missouri	Receiving	Luther Burden III	6 receptions, 60 yards

=== At No. 5 Tennessee ===
Uniform Combination
Helmet	Jersey	Pants

Missouri at No. 5 Tennessee

Quarter	1	2	3	4	Total
Missouri	7	10	7	0	24
No. 5 Tennessee	7	21	21	17	66

at Neyland Stadium, Knoxville, TN

- Date: November 12
- Game time: Noon
- Game weather: Cloudy, 50 °F (10 °C)
- Game attendance: 101,915
- Referee: Kyle Olson
- TV announcers (CBS): Tom McCarthy (play-by-play), Rick Neuheisel (color), Sherree Burress (sideline)

=== vs New Mexico State ===
Uniform Combination
Helmet	Jersey	Pants

New Mexico State Aggies (4–5) at Missouri Tigers (4–6) – Game summary

Quarter	1	2	3	4	Total
Aggies	0	0	7	7	14
Tigers	7	14	14	10	45

at Faurot Field • Columbia, Missouri

- Date: November 19
- Game time: 6:00 p.m.
- Game weather: Clear • Temperature: 26 °F (−3 °C) • Wind: SE 14 MPH
- Game attendance: 45,231
- Referee: Lee Hedrick
- TV announcers (ESPNU): Drew Carter (play-by-play) and Forrest Conoly (analyst)

Game information

First quarter

- (6:14) MIZ – Luther Burden 12-yard pass from Brady Cook, Harrison Mevis kick (Drive: 11 plays, 64 yards, 5:18; Missouri 7–0)

Second quarter

- (12:02) MIZ – Cody Schrader 2-yard run, Harrison Mevis kick (Drive: 17 plays, 81 yards, 6:33; Missouri 14–0)
- (4:28) MIZ – Ryan Hoerstkamp 32-yard pass from Brady Cook, Harrison Mevis kick (Drive: 7 plays, 66 yards, 3:39; Missouri 21–0)

Third quarter

- (10:42) MIZ – Cody Schrader 5-yard run, Harrison Mevis kick (Drive: 9 plays, 69 yards, 4:13; Missouri 28–0)
- (4:29) NMSU – Star Thomas 10-yard run, Ethan Albertson kick (Drive: 10 plays, 75 yards, 6:13; Missouri 28–7)
- (0:55) MIZ – Luther Burden 12-yard pass from Brady Cook, Harrison Mevis kick (Drive: 7 plays, 70 yards, 3:29; Missouri 35–7)

Fourth quarter

- (12:41) MIZ – Daylan Carnell 40-yard interception, Harrison Mevis kick (Missouri 42–7)
- (9:54) MIZ – Harrison Mevis 43-yard field goal (Drive: 6 plays, 17 yards, 2:14; Missouri 45–7)
- (4:20) NMSU – Gavin Frakes 13-yard run, Ethan Albertson kick (Drive: 5 plays, 44 yards, 2:18; Missouri 45–14)

Statistics	NMSU	MIZ
First downs	16	24
Total yards	259	443
Rushing yards	115	261
Passing yards	144	182
Turnovers	2	1
Time of possession	30:34	29:26

Team	Category	Player	Statistics
New Mexico State	Passing	Diego Pavia	6/17, 76 yards, INT
New Mexico State	Rushing	Diego Pavia	9 carries, 50 yards
New Mexico State	Receiving	J. J. Jones	2 receptions, 38 yards
Missouri	Passing	Brady Cook	19/27, 251 yards, 3 TD
Missouri	Rushing	Brady Cook	7 carries, 71 yards
Missouri	Receiving	Barrett Banister	7 receptions, 91 yards

=== vs Arkansas ===
Uniform Combination
Helmet	Jersey	Pants

Arkansas Razorbacks (6–5) at Missouri Tigers (5–6) - Game summary

Quarter	1	2	3	4	Total
Razorbacks	7	14	3	3	27
Tigers	10	10	9	0	29

at Faurot Field • Columbia, Missouri

- Date: Friday, November 25, 2022
- Game time: 2:30 p.m. CST
- Game weather: Sunny • Temperature: 52 °F (11 °C) • Wind: 4 mph S
- Referee: Jason Autrey
- TV announcers (CBS): Tom McCarthy (play-by-play), Rick Neuheisel (analyst), Sherree Burruss (sideline)

Game information

First quarter

- (9:34) Missouri – Harrison Mevis 40 yard field goal (Drive: 7 plays, 46 yards, 3:16; Missouri 3–0)
- (5:26) Arkansas – KJ Jefferson 3 yard rush, Cam Little kick (Drive: 9 plays, 75 yards, 4:08; Arkansas 7–3)
- (2:56) Missouri – Cody Schrader 3 yard rush, Harrison Mevis kick (Drive: 7 plays, 75 yards, 2:30; Missouri 10–7)

Second quarter

- (14:56) Missouri – Brady Cook 9 yard rush, Harrison Mevis kick (Drive: 5 plays, 74 yards, 1:38; Missouri 17–7)
- (9:26) Arkansas – Matt Landers 27 yard pass from KJ Jefferson, Cam Little kick (Drive: 12 plays, 75 yards, 5:30; Missouri 17–14)
- (5:26) Missouri – Harrison Mevis 27 yard field goal (Drive: 9 plays, 65 yards, 4:00; Missouri 20–14)
- (1:35) Arkansas – Raheim Sanders 8 yard pass from KJ Jefferson, Cam Little kick (Drive: 11 plays, 75 yards, 3:51; Arkansas 21–20)

Third quarter

- (10:09) Missouri – Luther Burden III 23 yard pass from Brady Cook, 2-point pass failed (Drive: 10 plays, 75 yards, 4:51; Missouri 26–21)
- (5:32) Missouri – Harrison Mevis 29 yard field goal (Drive: 7 plays, 17 yards, 3:19; Missouri 29–21)
- (1:43) Arkansas – Cam Little 46 yard field goal (Drive: 10 plays, 47 yards, 3:49; Missouri 29–24)

Fourth quarter

- (12:40) Arkansas – Cam Little 20 yard field goal (Drive: 7 plays, 51 yards, 2:30; Missouri 29–27)

Statistics	ARK	MIZ
First downs	22	19
Plays–yards	66–324	65–468
Rushes–yards	38–113	39–226
Passing yards	211	242
Passing: comp–att–int	20–28–1	16–26–0
Turnovers		
Time of possession	28:18	31:42

Team	Category	Player	Statistics
Arkansas	Passing	KJ Jefferson	20–27, 205 yards, 2 TD
Arkansas	Rushing	Raheim Sanders	10 carries, 47 yards
Arkansas	Receiving	Matt Landers	4 receptions, 79 yards, 1 TD
Missouri	Passing	Brady Cook	16–26, 242 yards, 1 TD
Missouri	Rushing	Brady Cook	18 carries, 138 yards, 1 TD
Missouri	Receiving	Dominic Lovett	6 receptions, 130 yards

=== vs Wake Forest (Gasparilla Bowl) ===
	1	2	3	4	Total
Tigers	3	7	7	0	17
Demon Deacons	7	7	6	7	27

== After the season ==
=== NFL draft ===
The NFL draft was held in Kansas City, Missouri on April 27–29, 2023.

Missouri Tigers who were picked in the 2023 NFL Draft:

Round	Pick	Player	Position	NFL team
4	126	Isaiah McGuire	DE	Cleveland Browns
