= Greg Penn =

American football player

Greg Penn III
No. 18 – LSU Tigers
- Position: Linebacker
- Class: Senior

Personal information
- Listed height: 6 ft 1 in (1.85 m)
- Listed weight: 226 lb (103 kg)

Career information
- High school: DeMatha Catholic (Hyattsville, Maryland)
- College: LSU (2021–present)
- Stats at ESPN

Greg Penn III is an American college football linebacker for the LSU Tigers.

== Early life ==
Penn attended DeMatha Catholic High School in Hyattsville, Maryland. He was rated as a four-star recruit and received offers from schools such as LSU, Texas A&M, Alabama, Tennessee, South Carolina and Maryland. Ultimately, Penn committed to play college football for the LSU Tigers.

== College career ==
In week 12 of the 2022 season, Penn notched ten tackles with two and a half being for a loss, and a pass deflection, in a win over the Arkansas Razorbacks. He appeared in 24 games in his first two collegiate seasons in 2021 and 2022, recording 89 tackles with six being for a loss, three pass deflections, and a fumble recovery. In week 4 of the 2023 season, Penn notched a team-high 12 tackles, a sack, and a pass deflection in a win over Arkansas. He finished the 2023 season with 89 tackles with seven being for a loss, four sacks, two interceptions, and a forced fumble for the Tigers.

== Professional career ==
Pre-draft measurables
Height	Weight	Arm length	Hand span	40-yard dash	10-yard split	20-yard split	20-yard shuttle	Three-cone drill	Vertical jump	Broad jump	Bench press
6 ft 0 3/4 in (1.85 m)	226 lb (103 kg)	30 7/8 in (0.78 m)	8 7/8 in (0.23 m)	4.78 s	1.65 s	2.82 s	4.51 s	7.24 s	32.5 in (0.83 m)	9 ft 4 in (2.84 m)	21 reps
All values from Pro Day
