= Cam Little =

American football player (born 2003)

- Little with the Arkansas Razorbacks

No. 39 – Jacksonville Jaguars
- Position: Placekicker
- Roster status: Active

Personal information
- Born: August 17, 2003 (age 23); Moore, Oklahoma, U.S.
- Listed height: 6 ft 1 in (1.85 m)
- Listed weight: 172 lb (78 kg)

Career information
- High school: Southmoore (Moore)
- College: Arkansas (2021–2023)
- NFL draft: 2024: 6th round, 212th overall pick

Career history
- Jacksonville Jaguars (2024–present)

Awards and highlights
- PFWA All-Rookie Team (2024); Longest field goal on record, 70 yards, 2025 (preseason); NFL records: Longest NFL field goal: 68 yards; Longest NFL field goal (outdoors): 67 yards

Career NFL statistics as of Week 10, 2026
- Field goals made: 75
- Field goals attempted: 83
- Field goal %: 90.4%
- Extra points made: 106
- Extra points attempted: 108
- Extra point %: 98.1%
- Points: 331
- Longest field goal: 68
- Stats at Pro Football Reference

Cameron Little (born August 17, 2003) is an American professional football placekicker for the Jacksonville Jaguars of the National Football League (NFL). He played college football for the Arkansas Razorbacks, with whom he holds the highest field goal percentage of any kicker in program history, and he finished his college career without having missed an extra point. Little was drafted by the Jaguars in the sixth round of the 2024 NFL draft. He holds the record for the longest field goal in an organized football game, converting a 70-yard kick during a 2025 NFL preseason game. During the 2025 regular season, Little made a 68-yard field goal, surpassing the previous NFL record of 66 yards set by Justin Tucker in 2021. Later that season, he added a 67-yard field goal in Week 18, giving him the two longest field goals in NFL history.

== Early life ==
Cameron Little was born in Moore, Oklahoma, on August 17, 2003, to Ronda and Todd Little. He initially played soccer, but played high school football at Southmoore High School as a placekicker and punter. Little was ranked the No. 1 kicking prospect in his class by 247Sports, the No. 2 kicker and No. 8 punter according to Kohl's Kicking, and a consensus three-star prospect.

Little committed to Arkansas on July 22, 2020. He held offers from multiple other schools, including Air Force, Army, Colorado, Navy, Nevada, and Oklahoma State.

== College career ==
Little played college football at the University of Arkansas. He was the Razorbacks' starting placekicker for each of his three seasons, from 2021 to 2023.

As a freshman, Little earned SEC Freshman of the Week twice and SEC Special Teams Player of the Week once. He made a game-winning field goal against LSU on November 13, 2021, and finished the season having missed only four field goals out of 24 attempts. Little was named a Freshman All-American by the Football Writers Association of America, Pro Football Focus, and The Athletic.

Little's sophomore season saw him convert 13 of his 16 field goal attempts with a long of 51 yards, which he made in the second quarter of Arkansas's game against Mississippi State. Little's 89 total points ranked most on the team.

Prior to the 2023 season, Little was named to the Wuerffel Trophy watchlist; he finished that year going 20-for-24 on field goals and making all 33 extra points he attempted. Little set a new career long when he converted a 56-yard kick against Ole Miss on October 7, 2023, and was named to the all-SEC First Team as a kickoff specialist.

Little finished at Arkansas with a career field goal percentage of 82.8%, the highest of any placekicker in Arkansas history, and made every extra point he attempted. Little participated in two bowl games with the Razorbacks: wins over Penn State in the 2022 Outback Bowl and Kansas in the 2022 Liberty Bowl. He made a donation to Down Syndrome Connection of Northwest Arkansas for every kick he made, ultimately totaling $1,460, and was featured on Good Morning America as a result.

Little opted to forgo his senior season and declared for the NFL draft on December 1, 2023. Mel Kiper Jr., an NFL draft analyst with ESPN, named Little the top kicking prospect of his draft class. Little was one of two kickers invited to play in the East-West Shrine Bowl, alongside Missouri's Harrison Mevis, and made two field goals during the game, one from 26 yards in the second quarter and another from 48 yards in the fourth quarter.

== Professional career ==
Pre-draft measurables
Height	Weight	Arm length	Hand span	Wingspan
6 ft 1 in (1.85 m)	172 lb (78 kg)	30 1/2 in (0.77 m)	9 1/4 in (0.23 m)	6 ft 1 5/8 in (1.87 m)
All values from NFL Combine

Little was selected by the Jacksonville Jaguars in the sixth round (212th overall) in the 2024 NFL draft. He is the youngest kicker ever to be drafted into the NFL. Little beat Riley Patterson early in training camp to be the kicker for the Jaguars in 2024. He was named to the PFWA All-Rookie Team.

On August 9, 2025, Little kicked a 70-yard field goal in a preseason game against the Pittsburgh Steelers; as of 2026, this is the longest recorded successful field goal in a game at any level of organized football. The field goal was one yard longer than Ove Johansson's record set while playing for Abilene Christian University in 1976. However, due to Little's kick occurring during an NFL preseason game, it did not officially count as an NFL record. On November 2, while visiting the Las Vegas Raiders, Little made a 68-yard field goal at the end of the first half, breaking the previous record of 66 yards set in 2021 by Justin Tucker of the Baltimore Ravens. During the regular season finale against the Tennessee Titans at EverBank Stadium in Jacksonville, Little made NFL history by kicking a 67-yard field goal, setting the record for the longest outdoor kick and the second-longest NFL field goal.

Little made a game-winning 57-yard field goal as time expired on October 11, 2026, to defeat the Philadelphia Eagles 19–17 in London. In Week 9 against the Baltimore Ravens, Little went 4-of-4 on field goals and posted a career-high 15 total points in the game, earning him AFC Special Teams Player of the Week. Little won AFC Special Teams Player of the Week again the following week after making all four of his field goals and all four of his extra points against the Tennessee Titans in Week 10.

== Career statistics ==
Legend
	NFL record
	Led the league
**Bold**	Career high

=== NFL ===
==== Regular season ====
General			Field goals					PATs			Kickoffs			Points
Season	Team	GP	FGM	FGA	FG%	Blck	Long	XPM	XPA	XP%	KO	Avg	TBs	Pts
2024	JAX	17	27	29	**93.1%**	0	59	27	27	**100.0%**	76	**64.0**	**65**	108
2025	JAX	17	**30**	**34**	88.2%	0	**68**	**50**	**51**	98.0%	**97**	61.0	37	**140**
2026	JAX	9	18	20	90.0%	0	60	29	20	96.7%	55	62.0	8	83
Career		43	75	83	90.4%	0	68	106	108	98.1%	228	62.3	110	315

==== Postseason ====
General			Field goals					PATs			Kickoffs			Points
Season	Team	GP	FGM	FGA	FG%	Blck	Long	XPM	XPA	XP%	KO	Avg	TBs	Pts
2025	JAX	1	1	2	50.0%	0	43	3	3	100.0%	5	63.8	1	6
Career		1	1	2	50.0%	0	43	3	3	100.0%	5	63.8	1	6

=== College ===
Legend
NCAA record

College statistics
Year	Team	GP	FGM	FGA	Pct	Lng	XPM	XPA	Pct	Pts
2021	Arkansas	13	**20**	**24**	**83.3%**	51	46	46	**100.0%**	**106**
2022	Arkansas	13	13	16	81.3%	51	**50**	**50**	**100.0%**	89
2023	Arkansas	12	**20**	**24**	**83.3%**	**56**	33	33	**100.0%**	93
Career		38	53	64	82.8%	56	129	129	100.0%	288

== Personal life ==
Little is a Christian. Little drew media attention for his charity work with Down Syndrome Connection of Northwest Arkansas, which led to an appearance on Good Morning America.
