= Bishop Dunne Catholic School =

Location
- 3900 Rugged Drive; Dallas, Texas 75224; United States; 32°41′42″N 96°51′4″W

Information
- Former names: Our Lady of Good Counsel High School (1961–1963); Bishop Dunne High School (1963–2000)
- Type: Private college preparatory middle school and high school
- Religious affiliation: Catholic
- Established: 1961; 65 years ago
- Authority: Diocese of Dallas
- NCES School ID: 01324523
- President: Gabe Moreno
- Principal: Stephen Guerrero
- Teaching staff: 42.6 ((on an FTE basis)) (2021–22)
- Grades: 6–12
- Gender: Coeducational
- Enrollment: 377 (2021–22)
- Student to teacher ratio: 8.8
- Campus: Large city
- Campus size: 22 acres (89,000 m^{2})
- Colors: Red and Blue
- Athletics conference: High school: TAPPS; Middle school: Dallas Parochial League
- Mascot: Falcons
- Accreditation: Southern Association of Colleges and Schools
- Newspaper: Falconer
- Yearbook: Mitre
- School fees: $1,470
- Tuition: High School – $16,737; Middle School – $12,900
- Affiliation: National Catholic Educational Association
- Website: bdcs.org

Bishop Dunne Catholic School is a college preparatory middle and high school located in the Oak Cliff area of Dallas, Texas, United States.

== Renovation ==
In 2013, Bishop Dunne Catholic School received a $6 million grant from Bishop Kevin Farrell. The school stated they would use the money to renovate infrastructure, including installing new heating and air conditioning systems, upgraded electrical systems, and a new front office and auditorium.

Classrooms have been renovated with technology teaching walls, LEEDS environmental and acoustical standards, and new ceilings and flooring. The front office areas have also been completed. The auditorium and chapel have been re-modeled.

The classrooms were completed to begin the 2013-2014 school year while the auditorium and chapel are being worked on during the school year.

== Campus ==
Bishop Dunne is designed in a three pillar format. These compose the four main hallways of the campus. Within the school are three courtyards, two of which have been dedicated. The Vincent Langbein Memorial Garden and the Father Tim Gollob Garden Sanctuary were named after previous employees for their support and investment of the school. These gardens, which have been xeriscaped to minimize the carbon footprint of the school, function as a teaching tool for biology classes, a place of solitude for reflection, and as a patio for lunch.

In the center of the campus is the Chapel where students may go to for monthly confession. Also, theology classes hold weekly rosaries, reflections on bible readings, and solemn prayer.

The gymnasium has undergone renovations within the recent years. The improvements include professional grade wood flooring, heating and air conditioning, and bleachers. In conjunction with these additions the Orender Field House was constructed. This added a dance room, an additional weight and training room, and a locker room.

On campus, there are three fields that are utilized by Bishop Dunne's sports teams. Directly behind the school is the Earl Hayes Stadium. This is where the football, soccer, and track and field teams have their games. Adjacent to the stadium is the Steve Macko Baseball Field and the softball field next to it.

== State championships ==
Bishop Dunne has won state championships in the following sports:

- Baseball: 1969, 1970, 1972
- Boys Basketball: 1972, 1979
- Girls Basketball: 1975
- Cross Country: 1970, 1999, 2000, 2001
- Football: 1984, 1988, 1990, 2014, 2018
- Softball: 1984
- Boys Track & Field: 1971, 1972, 1973, 1976, 1984, 1985, 1986, 1987, 1988, 1989, 1990, 1991, 1992, 1993, 1994, 1995
- Girls Track & Field: 1975, 1977, 1984, 1985, 1986, 1987, 1988, 1989, 1993, 1996, 1997, 1999, 2000, 2001, 2002

== Notable alumni ==
- Mike Bacsik, Major League Baseball pitcher for the Texas Rangers and Minnesota Twins from 1975 to 1980
- Darrion Daniels, NFL player
- Roderick Lewis, NFL player
- Steve Macko, played for the Chicago Cubs from 1979–80 before being diagnosed with testicular cancer.
- Bobby Watkins, NFL player
- Brian Williams, NFL player, won Super Bowl XXXI with the Green Bay Packers.
- Andrew Armstrong, NFL wide receiver
