= Trajan Jeffcoat =

American football player (born 1999)

Hamilton Tiger-Cats
- Position: Defensive end
- Roster status: Practice roster

Personal information
- Born: October 7, 1999 (age 27); Columbia, South Carolina, U.S.
- Listed height: 6 ft 4 in (1.93 m)
- Listed weight: 266 lb (121 kg)

Career information
- High school: Irmo (Columbia)
- College: Missouri (2018–2022); Arkansas (2023)
- NFL draft: 2024: undrafted

Career history
- New Orleans Saints (2024)*; Hamilton Tiger-Cats (2026–present)*
- * Offseason or practice squad member only

Awards and highlights
- First-Team All-SEC (2020)
- Stats at Pro Football Reference

Trajan Jeffcoat (born October 7, 1999) is an American professional football defensive end for the Hamilton Tiger-Cats of the Canadian Football League (CFL). He played college football for the Missouri Tigers and Arkansas Razorbacks.

== Early life ==
Jeffcoat attended Irmo High School in Columbia, South Carolina. He was rated as a three-star prospect coming out of high school and committed to play at Missouri.

== College career ==
In October, 2019, Jeffcoat unenrolled from Missouri before re-enrolling in August, 2020.

=== College statistics ===
Legend
**Bold**	Career high

Year	Team	Games	Tackles				Interceptions						Fumbles			
Year	Team	Games	Solo	Ast	Tot	Sck	PD	Int	Yds	Avg	Lng	TD	FF	FR	Yds	TD
2018	Missouri	6	5	1	6	1.0	0	0	0	0.0	0	0	0	0	0	0
2019	Missouri	0	Redshirt													
2020	Missouri	8	17	6	23	**6.0**	0	0	0	0.0	0	0	**1**	0	0	0
2021	Missouri	**13**	**23**	**11**	**34**	3.5	**1**	0	0	0.0	0	0	**1**	**1**	0	**1**
2022	Missouri	**13**	14	7	21	1.0	0	0	0	0.0	0	0	0	0	0	0
2023	Arkansas	12	7	9	16	4.0	0	0	0	0.0	0	0	0	0	0	0
Career		52	66	34	100	15.5	1	0	0	0.0	0	0	2	1	0	1

== Professional career ==
Pre-draft measurables
Height	Weight	Arm length	Hand span	Wingspan	40-yard dash	10-yard split	20-yard split	20-yard shuttle	Three-cone drill	Vertical jump	Broad jump	Bench press
6 ft 3 7/8 in (1.93 m)	266 lb (121 kg)	32 3/4 in (0.83 m)	10 1/8 in (0.26 m)	6 ft 7 1/2 in (2.02 m)	4.69 s	1.66 s	2.76 s	4.52 s	7.38 s	31.5 in (0.80 m)	10 ft 0 in (3.05 m)	21 reps
All values from NFL Combine/Pro Day

=== New Orleans Saints ===
On April 29, 2024, Jeffcoat signed with the New Orleans Saints as an undrafted free agent. He was also selected by the Birmingham Stallions in the sixth round of the 2024 UFL draft on July 17. He was waived/injured on August 23. On November 6, Jeffcoat was re-signed to the Saints' practice squad.

=== Hamilton Tiger-Cats ===
On September 12, 2026, Jeffcoat signed with the Hamilton Tiger-Cats of the Canadian Football League (CFL).

== Personal life ==
Jeffcoat is the son of Tawanna Jeffcoat and Chatric Darby. He has two siblings, Raniyah Williams and Fa’Quon Jeffcoat.
