= KJ Jefferson =

American football player (born 2001)

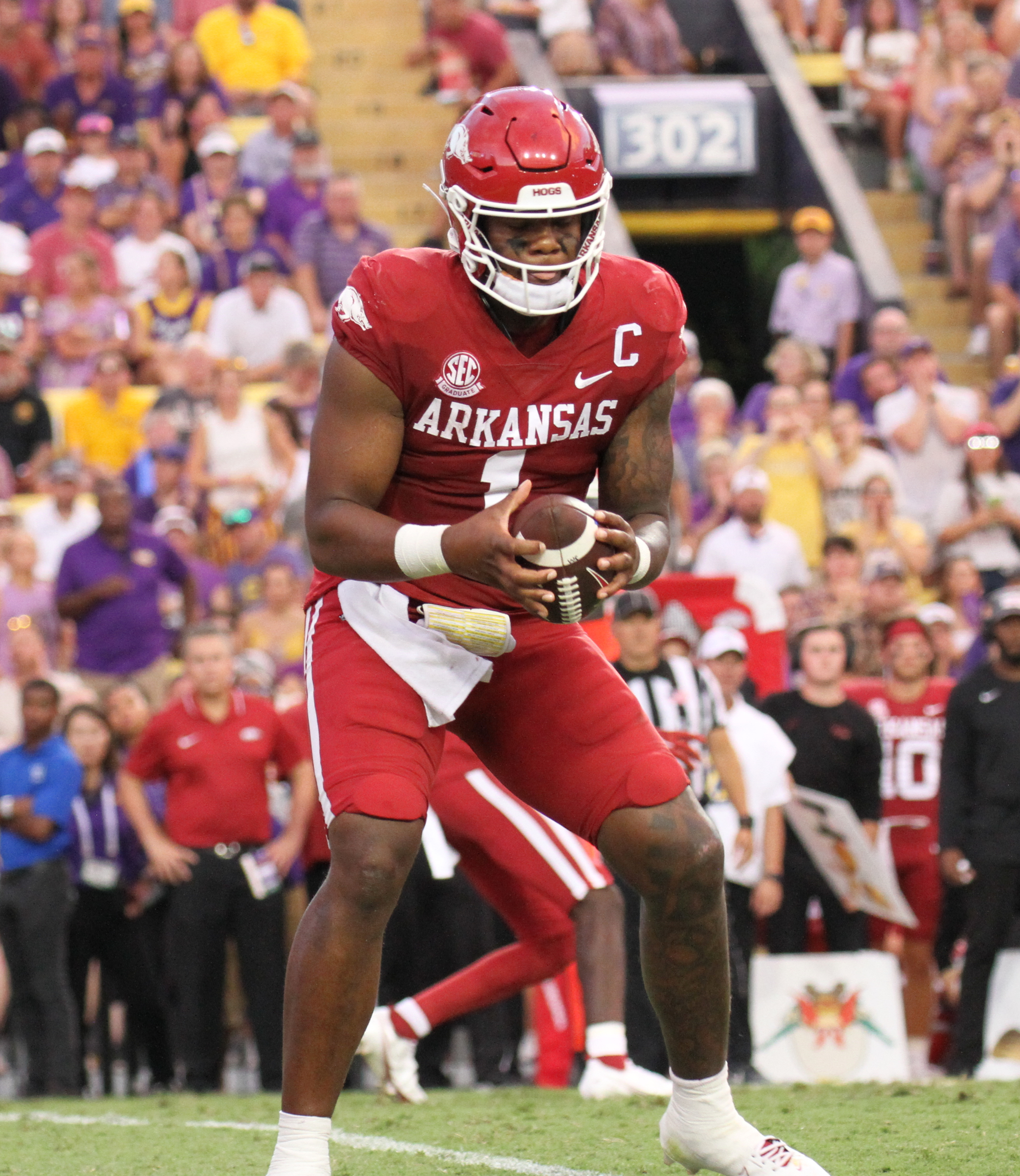
- Jefferson with Arkansas in 2023

No. 1
- Position: Quarterback

Personal information
- Born: May 20, 2001 (age 25); Sardis, Mississippi, U.S.
- Listed height: 6 ft 4 in (1.93 m)
- Listed weight: 266 lb (121 kg)

Career information
- High school: North Panola (Sardis)
- College: Arkansas (2019–2023); UCF (2024)
- Stats at ESPN

Kenneth Dewayne "KJ" Jefferson Jr. (born May 20, 2001) is an American former college football quarterback who played for the Arkansas Razorbacks and UCF Knights.

== Early life ==
Jefferson attended North Panola High School in Sardis, Mississippi. He finished his high school career with 9,582 passing yards, 2,922 rushing yards and 143 total touchdowns. A four-star prospect, he committed to play college football at the University of Arkansas.

== College career ==
=== 2019 season ===
Jefferson spent his true freshman year at Arkansas in 2019 as a backup to Nick Starkel who lost the starting job to SMU transfer, Ben Hicks. He made his first career start against LSU. He finished the season, completing 14 of his 31 passes for 197 yards with one interception and also rushed for two touchdowns before redshirting.

=== 2020 season ===
As a redshirt freshman in 2020, he was the backup to Feleipe Franks. He appeared in five games and made one start for an injured Franks. He finished the season completing 20 of 41 passes for 295 yards, three passing touchdowns and two rushing touchdowns.

=== 2021 season ===
Jefferson entered the 2021 season as the starter. Jefferson started all twelve games for Arkansas, helping the Razorbacks finish the season 8–4 overall record, and 4–4 in SEC games. This included a non-conference victory over Texas, and trophy game wins over Texas A&M (The Southwest Classic), LSU (Battle for the Boot), and Missouri (Battle Line Rivalry). It was the first time in team history that Arkansas had won all three trophy games in the same season. Jefferson started for Arkansas in their season-ending Outback Bowl game versus Penn State, and led the Razorbacks to a 24–10 victory, and a 9–4 final record. Jefferson was named the Outback Bowl MVP. His final season statistics after the bowl game were 2,676 yards passing for 21 touchdowns and only four interceptions while completing 67.3 percent of his passes for a QB efficiency rating of 164.7. He also rushed 146 times for 664 yards and six rushing touchdowns, all team highs.

=== 2022 season ===
Jefferson was again Arkansas' starting quarterback in 2022, starting twelve of the Razorbacks' thirteen games. He led Arkansas to an overall record of 7–6, 3–5 in SEC play. Four of Arkansas' six losses (Texas A&M, Liberty, LSU, Missouri) were by a grand total of nine points. Jefferson sat out the LSU game due to injury. He guided Arkansas to their second straight bowl victory, beating Kansas in an exciting 2022 Liberty Bowl, 55–53 in 3OT. Jefferson was named the Liberty Bowl MVP, completing 19 of 29 passes for 287 yards and two touchdowns, and rushing for 130 yards and two rushing touchdowns on 14 carries. He finished the season with a QB efficiency rating of 165.2, slightly better than the previous season.

=== 2023 season ===
Jefferson returned to Arkansas for his redshirt senior season in 2023. He would go on to pass for 2,107 yards, 19 touchdowns, and 8 interceptions while running 161 times for 447 yards and 2 touchdowns. His 8 interceptions marked the highest of his career, and he posted the lowest completion percentage, passing yards, completions, yards per attempt, and touchdowns since he became the starter in 2021. The Razorbacks would finish the season 4–8 and miss out on bowl eligibility for the first time since 2019.

On December 16, 2023, Jefferson announced that he would be entering the transfer portal. Jefferson would leave Arkansas as one of the best quarterbacks the program had ever had, setting program records for the most career passing yards, passing touchdowns, and completions, as well as having the highest career completion percentage.

=== 2024 season ===
On January 1, 2024, Jefferson announced that he would be transferring to UCF. Jefferson was benched during the October 12 game against Cincinnati and remained benched for the October 19 game against #10 Iowa State in favor of sophomore Miami transfer Jacurri Brown. He did not see the field again for UCF.

=== College statistics ===
Season	Team	Games			Passing								Rushing			
Season	Team	GP	GS	Record	Comp	Att	Pct	Yards	Avg	TD	Int	Rate	Att	Yards	Avg	TD
2019	Arkansas	3	1	0–1	14	31	45.2	197	6.4	0	1	92.1	30	58	1.9	2
2020	Arkansas	5	1	0–1	20	41	48.8	295	7.2	3	0	133.4	28	67	2.4	2
2021	Arkansas	13	13	9–4	198	294	66.9	2,676	9.1	21	4	164.7	146	664	4.5	6
2022	Arkansas	11	11	7–4	204	300	68.3	2,648	9.6	24	5	164.9	158	640	4.1	9
2023	Arkansas	12	12	4–8	190	296	64.2	2,107	7.1	19	8	139.3	161	447	2.8	2
2024	UCF	5	5	3–2	64	108	59.3	1,012	9.4	7	4	152.0	61	193	3.2	2
Career		49	43	23–20	690	1,070	64.5	8,923	8.3	74	22	153.2	584	2,069	3.5	23
