= Marcus Woodson =

American football coach

Current position
- Title: Co–defensive coordinator
- Team: Ole Miss
- Conference: SEC

Biographical details
- Born: Moss Point, Mississippi, U.S.

Playing career
- 1999–2002: Ole Miss
- Position: Safety

Coaching career (HC unless noted)
- 2005–2008: Millsaps (DB)
- 2009–2011: Charleston Southern (DB/RC)
- 2012–2013: Charleston Southern (DB/PGC/RC)
- 2014–2015: Fresno State (DB)
- 2016–2017: Memphis (DB)
- 2018: Auburn (DB)
- 2019: Auburn (DB/RC)
- 2020–2022: Florida State (DB)
- 2023–2025: Arkansas (co-DC/S)
- 2026–present: Ole Miss (co-DC)

Marcus Woodson is an American football coach who is the co-defensive coordinator and defensive backs coach for Ole Miss.

== Playing career ==
Woodson played for four years at Ole Miss. In those four years, he started two years at the safety position, notching one interception. However, he suffered a career-ending injury.

== Coaching career ==
Woodson started his coaching career at Millsaps as the defensive backs coach, where he stayed for three seasons. He was hired at Charleston Southern as defensive backs coach, and also became the team's recruiting coordinator. He then became the defensive backs coach at Fresno State. After two years with Fresno State, Woodson was hired by Memphis as the defensive backs coach.

After a two-year stint with Memphis, Woodson moved to Auburn as the team's defensive backs coach. After one season with Auburn, he became recruiting coordinator.

After two seasons with Auburn, Woodson became the defensive backs coach at Florida State. After three years with Florida State, he got his first coordinator role, as he was hired by Arkansas to be their co-defensive coordinator and safeties coach.

In December 2025, new head coach Collin Klein hired Woodson as co-defensive coordinator and defensive backs coach on his inaugural coaching staff at Kansas State.
