= Harrison Mevis =

American football placekicker (born 2002)

- Mevis with the Los Angeles Rams in 2025

Profile
- Position: Kicker

Personal information
- Born: March 27, 2002 (age 24); Warsaw, Indiana, U.S.
- Listed height: 6 ft 0 in (1.83 m)
- Listed weight: 245 lb (111 kg)

Career information
- High school: Warsaw Community
- College: Missouri (2020–2023)
- NFL draft: 2024: undrafted

Career history
- Carolina Panthers (2024)*; Birmingham Stallions (2025); New York Jets (2025)*; Los Angeles Rams (2025–2026); Baltimore Ravens (2026)*
- * Offseason or practice squad member only

Awards and highlights
- First-team All-American (2021); First-team All-SEC (2021); Second-team All-SEC (2023); Freshman All-American (2020)

Career NFL statistics as of Week 5, 2026
- Field goals made: 17
- Field goals attempted: 22
- Field goal %: 77.3%
- Extra points made: 53
- Extra points attempted: 53
- Extra point %: 100%
- Points: 104
- Longest field goal: 52
- Touchbacks: 6
- Stats at Pro Football Reference

Harrison Mevis (born March 27, 2002), nicknamed "the Thiccer Kicker", is an American professional football placekicker. He played college football for the Missouri Tigers and was signed by the Carolina Panthers as an undrafted free agent in 2024. Mevis made his regular-season National Football League (NFL) debut in 2025 with the Los Angeles Rams.

== Early life ==
Mevis attended Warsaw Community High School in Warsaw, Indiana, where he lettered in football and soccer. As a senior he earned all-conference and all-state honors in football while playing for the Tigers, who he led to a 9–3 record and the IHSAA Football Class 6A State Regional final. Rated Three-star kicking prospect by all the major recruiting services, Mevis committed to Missouri.

== College career ==
As a freshman, Mevis went 17/20 (85%) on field goals including a game-winning field goal against Arkansas. He also went 28/28 on PATs as a freshman. As a sophomore, Mevis emerged as one of the premier place kickers in the nation, going 23/25 (93%) on field goal attempts. He also was a perfect 3/3 on field goals longer than 50 yards with a long of 56 yards. Mevis was also a perfect 41/41 of PATs. Following his sophomore season, Mevis was named first team All-SEC and was a first team All-America selection. On September 16, 2023, during the closing seconds of a game against 15th–ranked Kansas State, Mevis kicked a 61-yard field goal to win the game 30–27 for Missouri, breaking the record for the longest field goal in SEC history. In his Senior Night game, he hit a 30-yard game-winning field goal to lead the Tigers to a 33–31 triumph over the Florida Gators, and was later named second team All-SEC.

=== College statistics ===
Legend
	Led the FBS
**Bold**	Career high

General			Field goals					PATs			Kickoffs			Points
Season	Team	GP	FGM	FGA	FG%	Blck	Long	XPM	XPA	XP%	KO	Avg	TBs	Pts
2020	Missouri	10	17	20	85.0%	0	52	28	28	100.0%	0	0.0	0	79
2021	Missouri	14	**26**	28	**92.9%**	0	56	42	42	100.0%	0	0.0	0	**120**
2022	Missouri	13	22	28	78.6%	0	56	33	33	100.0%	1	**65.0**	1	99
2023	Missouri	13	24	**30**	80.0%	**1**	**61**	**45**	**46**	97.8%	**79**	62.7	**48**	117
Career		50	89	106	84.0%	1	61	148	149	99.3%	80	62.8	49	415

== Professional career ==
Pre-draft measurables
Height	Weight	Arm length	Hand span	Wingspan
5 ft 11 7/8 in (1.83 m)	241 lb (109 kg)	30 3/4 in (0.78 m)	8 7/8 in (0.23 m)	6 ft 2 3/8 in (1.89 m)
All values from NFL Combine

=== Carolina Panthers ===
Mevis signed with the Carolina Panthers as an undrafted free agent on May 10, 2024. Despite participating in minicamp, OTAs and the first part of training camp and kicking a 41-yard field goal to account for all of Carolina's points in a 17–3 preseason-opening loss to the New England Patriots, he was waived by the Panthers on August 11.

=== Birmingham Stallions ===
On December 6, 2024, Mevis signed with the Birmingham Stallions of the United Football League (UFL). In week 7, Mevis went 3-for-3 on field goal attempts with a long of 52 yards and was named the UFL special teams player of the week. He converted 20 of his 21 attempted field goals, or 95.2%.

=== New York Jets ===
On June 18, 2025, the New York Jets signed Mevis. He converted three of four field goals and two PAT attempts during the preseason, but was waived on August 26 as part of final roster cuts and re-signed to the practice squad the next day. On September 16, Mevis was released.

=== Los Angeles Rams ===
==== 2025 season ====
On November 5, 2025, Mevis was signed to the Los Angeles Rams' practice squad. He was elevated to the active roster on November 8, and a day later made his NFL debut. Replacing a struggling Joshua Karty, Mevis converted all six of his point-after attempts in the Rams' 42–26 victory over the San Francisco 49ers Versus the Seattle Seahawks the following week, Mevis converted three extra point attempts but again did not attempt a field goal in the Rams' 21–19 win. On November 19, Mevis was signed to the active roster, and converted four more PATs and made both field goal attempts of 40 and 52 yards to help L.A. defeat the Tampa Bay Buccaneers, 34–7.

Mevis's active spot on the roster became permanent on November 28 when the Rams waived Karty. Against Arizona in Week 14, Mevis converted six PATS and a field goal in a 45–17 victory, while adding five PAT conversions and two field goals in the Rams' 41–34 Week 15 win over Detroit. In Week 15, Mevis added four more PATs and converted three field goals against Seattle, but missed a 48-yard field goal late in the fourth quarter of the Rams' 38–37 overtime loss at Seattle, his first missed field goal attempt in the NFL. In the Rams' regular season finale, Mevis had his most productive day as a professional kicker, converting three field goals and four PATs in L.A.'s 37–20 victory over Arizona in Week 18.

For his first NFL season, Mevis made 12 of 13 field goal attempts and was 39-for-39 on PATs in nine games. In the playoffs, Mevis converted field goals of 46 and 42 yards and all four PATs in the Rams' 34–31 victory over the Carolina Panthers in an NFC Wild Card Game. In the NFC Divisional Round the following week, Mevis converted two field goals in the game, in which one was a game-winning field goal of 42 yards in the Rams' 20–17 overtime victory over the Chicago Bears. In a rematch with Seattle in the NFC Championship Game, Mevis converted two more field goals of 44 and 50 yards in the Rams' 31–27 loss. Mevis finished the postseason perfect on all placekicking attempts (9-for-9 PATs, 6-for-6 FG). On March 2, 2026, the Rams announced that they were tendering Mevis as an exclusive rights free agent.

==== 2026 season ====
Mevis did not make a field goal attempt in the Rams' 27–7 loss to San Francisco in Week 1, but missed on a 43-yard try at the end of the second quarter versus the New York Giants in Week 2. Against the Denver Broncos in Week 3 on Sunday Night Football, Mevis converted field goals of 36, 35, 40, and 48 yards along with two PATs in the Rams' 30–26 loss. In Week 5, against the Buffalo Bills, Mevis missed a 50-yard field goal and had a game-winning 48-yard field goal blocked by Greg Rousseau in overtime; the Rams lost 37–34. One day later, Mevis was released after missing four of nine field goals in the season.

=== Baltimore Ravens ===
On November 12, 2026, Mevis was signed to the Baltimore Ravens practice squad. On November 17, he was released.

== NFL career statistics ==
=== Regular season ===
General			Field goals					PATs			Kickoffs			Points	
Season	Team	GP	FGM	FGA	FG%	Blck	Long	XPM	XPA	XP%	KO	Avg	TBs	Pts	
2025	LAR	9	12	13	92.3	0	52	39	39	100.0	6	61.7	2	75	
2026	LAR	5	5	9	55.6	1	48	14	14	100.0	18	59.7	4	29	
2026	Career		14	17	22	77.2	1	52	53	53	100.0	24	60.2	6	104

=== Postseason ===
			Field goals					PATs			Points
Season	Team	GP	FGM	FGA	Pct	Blk	Lng	XPM	XPA	Pct	Pts
2025	LAR	3	6	6	100.0	0	50	9	9	100.0	27
Career		3	6	6	100.0	0	50	9	9	100.0	27

== Personal life ==
He is the younger brother of Andrew Mevis, who currently is a kicker with the Green Bay Blizzard of the IFL.
