= Andrew Armstrong (American football) =

American football player (born 2000)

No. 85 – Kansas City Chiefs
- Position: Wide receiver
- Roster status: Active

Personal information
- Born: October 31, 2000 (age 26); Dallas, Texas, U.S.
- Listed height: 6 ft 4 in (1.93 m)
- Listed weight: 210 lb (95 kg)

Career information
- High school: Bishop Dunne (Dallas, Texas)
- College: Texas A&M–Commerce (2019–2022); Arkansas (2023–2024)
- NFL draft: 2025: undrafted

Career history
- Miami Dolphins (2025)*; Detroit Lions (2025)*; Kansas City Chiefs (2026–present)
- * Offseason or practice squad member only

Awards and highlights
- First-team All-SEC (2024); First-team All-Southland (2022)

Career NFL statistics as of Week 10, 2026
- Receptions: 2
- Receiving yards: 56
- Receiving touchdowns: 1
- Stats at Pro Football Reference

Andrew Armstrong (born October 31, 2000) is an American professional football wide receiver for the Kansas City Chiefs of the National Football League (NFL). He played college football for the Texas A&M–Commerce Lions and Arkansas Razorbacks.

== Early life ==
Armstrong grew up in Dallas, Texas and attended Bishop Dunne Catholic School. In his high school career, Armstrong completed 33 receptions for 453 yards and eight touchdowns. He was an unranked wide receiver recruit and committed to Texas A&M–Commerce.

== College career ==
=== Texas A&M–Commerce ===
Armstrong did not appear in any games during his true freshman season in 2019 and received a redshirt. The season was canceled due to the COVID-19 pandemic. During the 2021 season, Armstrong played in 10 games and finished the season with having caught 15 passes for 297 yards and 3 touchdowns averaging 29.7 yards per game. During the 2022 season, he played in 11 games and finished the season with caught 62 passes for 1,020 yards and 13 touchdowns averaging 92.7 receiving yards per game. He was then named to the HERO Sports Sophomore All-America team.

On November 22, 2022, Armstrong announced that he would be entering the transfer portal. On December 11, 2022, he announced that he would be transferring to Arkansas.

=== Arkansas ===
During the 2023 season, in the Week 2 game against Kent State, he finished the game with four catches for 21 yards and two scores. During the team's game against Florida, Armstrong suffered through a scary injury after hitting his head on the ground while trying to make a catch against an opposing defender. After that play, he laid motionless on the ground for a few moments having trainers helping him before being able to get up by himself and giving a thumbs up to the crowd. Armstrong led the team in receiving yards with 764 on 56 receptions with 5 TD. He played in and started 11 games throughout the season and finished the season with 52 caught passes for 724 yards and four touchdowns averaging 65.7 yards per game. Armstrong returned to Arkansas for his senior season in 2024, helping the Razorbacks get back to a bowl game with a 6–6 record. He started all 12 games and finished the 2024 season with a team-high 78 receptions for 1,140 receiving yards, but only one receiving TD. Armstrong was named 1st team All-SEC by the AP, 2nd Team All-SEC by the Coaches and Phil Steele All American Honorable Mention for the 2024 season. He declared for the 2025 NFL Draft after the season.

== Professional career ==
Pre-draft measurables
Height	Weight	Arm length	Hand span	Wingspan	40-yard dash	10-yard split	20-yard split	20-yard shuttle	Three-cone drill	Vertical jump	Broad jump	Bench press
6 ft 3 3/4 in (1.92 m)	202 lb (92 kg)	32 1/8 in (0.82 m)	9 5/8 in (0.24 m)	6 ft 7 1/2 in (2.02 m)	4.51 s	1.53 s	2.65 s	4.18 s	6.75 s	37.5 in (0.95 m)	10 ft 4 in (3.15 m)	11 reps
All values from NFL Combine/Pro Day

=== Miami Dolphins ===
On May 9, 2025, Armstrong signed with the Miami Dolphins as an undrafted free agent after going unselected in the 2025 NFL draft. He was waived by the Dolphins on August 26 as a part of final roster cuts.

=== Detroit Lions ===
On December 1, 2025, Armstrong signed with the Detroit Lions' practice squad, but was released by the team on December 8.

=== Kansas City Chiefs ===
On January 6, 2026, Armstrong signed a reserve/future contract with the Kansas City Chiefs. On August 30, he was waived by the Chiefs as a part of final roster cuts; he was re-signed to the team's practice squad the next day. Armstrong recorded his first career catch for the Chiefs on October 18, in the second quarter. He was signed to the active roster on October 23.
