= Raheim Sanders =

American football player (born 2002)

No. 23 – Cleveland Browns
- Position: Running back
- Roster status: Injured reserve

Personal information
- Born: June 8, 2002 (age 24); Rockledge, Florida, U.S.
- Listed height: 6 ft 0 in (1.83 m)
- Listed weight: 230 lb (104 kg)

Career information
- High school: Rockledge
- College: Arkansas (2021–2023); South Carolina (2024)
- NFL draft: 2025: undrafted

Career history
- Los Angeles Chargers (2025)*; Cleveland Browns (2025–present)
- * Offseason or practice squad member only

Awards and highlights
- First-team All-SEC (2022); Second-team All-SEC (2024)

Career NFL statistics as of 2025
- Games played: 4
- Rushing yards: 92
- Rushing average: 3.4
- Rushing touchdowns: 1
- Stats at Pro Football Reference

Raheim G. "Rocket" Sanders (born June 8, 2002) is an American professional football running back for the Cleveland Browns of the National Football League (NFL). He played college football for the Arkansas Razorbacks and South Carolina Gamecocks.

== Career ==
=== Arkansas ===
Sanders attended Rockledge High School in Rockledge, Florida. Sanders was a three-sport athlete playing football, basketball, and track. Sanders averaged 9.5 points per game and 5.7 rebounds per game his junior season on the hardwood. Ran an 11.31 in the 100-meter dash during his first high school track meet. He played running back, wide receiver and linebacker in high school. He committed to the University of Arkansas to play college football.

As a true freshman at Arkansas in 2021, Sanders played in all 13 games and had 578 yards on 114 carries with five touchdowns. He returned to Arkansas as the starting running back in 2022.

On December 5, 2023, Sanders announced that he would be entering the transfer portal.

=== South Carolina ===
On December 13, 2023, Sanders announced that he would be transferring to the University of South Carolina.

=== Statistics ===
| Year | Team | Games | | Rushing | | | | Receiving | | | |
| Year | Team | GP | GS | Att | Yards | Avg | TD | Rec | Yards | Avg | TD |
|---|---|---|---|---|---|---|---|---|---|---|---|
| 2021 | Arkansas | 13 | 0 | 114 | 578 | 5.1 | 5 | 11 | 109 | 9.9 | 1 |
| 2022 | Arkansas | 13 | 13 | 222 | 1,443 | 6.5 | 10 | 28 | 271 | 9.7 | 2 |
| 2023 | Arkansas | 6 | 5 | 62 | 209 | 3.4 | 2 | 10 | 75 | 7.5 | 0 |
| 2024 | South Carolina | 12 | 11 | 183 | 881 | 4.8 | 11 | 27 | 316 | 11.7 | 2 |
| Career | | 44 | 29 | 581 | 3,111 | 5.4 | 28 | 76 | 771 | 10.1 | 5 |

== Professional career ==
Pre-draft measurables
| Height | Weight | Arm length | Hand span | Wingspan | 40-yard dash | 10-yard split | 20-yard split | 20-yard shuttle | Three-cone drill | Vertical jump | Broad jump | Bench press |
|---|---|---|---|---|---|---|---|---|---|---|---|---|
| 6 ft 0 in (1.83 m) | 217 lb (98 kg) | 31 1/2 in (0.80 m) | 9 1/4 in (0.23 m) | 6 ft 4 1/4 in (1.94 m) | 4.46 s | 1.55 s | 2.63 s | 4.46 s | 7.39 s | 36.5 in (0.93 m) | 10 ft 0 in (3.05 m) | 17 reps |
All values from NFL Combine/Pro Day

=== Los Angeles Chargers ===
Sanders signed with the Los Angeles Chargers as an undrafted free agent on April 26, 2025. On August 26, Sanders was waived by the Chargers due to final roster cuts.

=== Cleveland Browns ===
On August 27, 2025, Sanders was claimed off waivers by the Cleveland Browns. In a Week 1 loss to the Cincinnati Bengals, Sanders scored his first career touchdown on a one-yard rush.

== Personal life ==
Sanders is a Christian. He was baptized in June 2026. Sanders has a son named Raheim "RJ" Sanders Jr.
