= 2024 Atlantic Coast Conference football season =

Sports season

2024 ACC Football season
- League: NCAA Division I Football Bowl Subdivision
- Sport: Football
- Teams: 17

2025 NFL draft
- Top draft pick: Cam Ward, QB, Miami
- Picked by: Tennessee Titans, 1st overall

Regular season
- Season champions: SMU
- Runners-up: Clemson

ACC Championship Game
- Date: December 7, 2024
- Venue: Bank of America Stadium, Charlotte, North Carolina
- Champions: Clemson
- Runners-up: SMU
- Finals MVP: Cade Klubnik, QB, Clemson

Seasons
- ← 2023 2025 →

2024 Atlantic Coast Conference football standings
	Conf.			Overall
Team	W		L	W		L
No. 12 SMU y^	8	–	0	11	–	3
No. 14 Clemson y$^	7	–	1	10	–	4
No. 18 Miami (FL)	6	–	2	10	–	3
No. 20 Syracuse	5	–	3	10	–	3
Duke	5	–	3	9	–	4
Louisville	5	–	3	9	–	4
Georgia Tech	5	–	3	7	–	6
Boston College	4	–	4	7	–	6
Virginia Tech	4	–	4	6	–	7
Pittsburgh	3	–	5	7	–	6
NC State	3	–	5	6	–	7
North Carolina	3	–	5	6	–	7
Virginia	3	–	5	5	–	7
California	2	–	6	6	–	7
Wake Forest	2	–	6	4	–	8
Stanford	2	–	6	3	–	9
Florida State	1	–	7	2	–	10
Championship: Clemson 34, SMU 31
^ – College Football Playoff participant; $ – Conference champion; y – Championship game participant; Rankings from AP Poll

The 2024 Atlantic Coast Conference football season, part of the 2024 NCAA Division I FBS football season, was the 72nd season of college football play for the Atlantic Coast Conference (ACC). This was the ACC's first season with 17 members, after the additions of California, SMU, and Stanford. The entire schedule was released on January 24, 2024.

SMU finished as regular season champions with a perfect 8–0 conference record. Clemson finished second with a 7–1 conference record. Clemson prevailed in the Championship Game 34–31. Both Clemson and SMU were selected to the College Football Playoff and eleven other teams qualified for bowl games. The ACC was tied with the SEC for the conference with the most bowl participants as both conferences had thirteen teams qualifying for bowl games. However, the bowl season did not proceed well for the ACC, as they finished a collective 2–11 in bowl games. Their .154 winning percentage was the lowest of conferences sending more than one team to bowl games.

== Preseason ==
=== Recruiting classes ===
National rankings
Team	ESPN	Rivals	24/7	On3 Recruits	Total signees
Boston College	NR	97	94	86	13
California	63	52	55	56	20
Clemson	15	10	11	14	22
Duke	58	51	62	60	19
Florida State	13	12	12	12	23
Georgia Tech	34	29	33	35	23
Louisville	55	59	58	55	15
Miami	6	5	4	5	27
North Carolina	30	23	26	27	27
NC State	27	28	27	29	24
Pittsburgh	44	37	41	45	21
Stanford	31	27	30	37	25
SMU	NR	NR	107	98	10
Syracuse	42	36	38	38	24
Virginia	NR	92	87	79	13
Virginia Tech	40	46	45	32	16
Wake Forest	52	49	52	54	21

Note: ESPN only ranks the top 75 teams.

=== ACC Kickoff ===
The 2024 ACC Kickoff was held from July 22 through 25 at the Hilton Charlotte Uptown in Charlotte, North Carolina. With the addition of three new schools, the event expanded for the second time in two years adding an additional interview day for a total of four. Coverage of the event was televised by the ACC Network. Preseason media polls were released after the event on July 31.

The schedule for the teams is as follows:

Date	Team
July 22	Florida State
July 22	Georgia Tech
July 22	SMU

Date	Team
July 23	California
July 23	Pittsburgh
July 23	Stanford
July 23	Virginia
July 23	Virginia Tech

Date	Team
July 24	Boston College
July 24	Duke
July 24	Louisville
July 24	Miami
July 24	Wake Forest

Date	Team
July 25	Clemson
July 25	North Carolina
July 25	NC State
July 25	Syracuse

==== Preseason media polls ====
Predicted finish	Team	Votes (1st place)
1	Florida State	2,708 (81)
2	Clemson	2,657 (55)
3	Miami	2,344 (17)
4	NC State	2,318 (8)
5	Louisville	1,984
6	Virginia Tech	1,968 (5)
7	SMU	1,798
8	North Carolina	1,712
9	Georgia Tech	1,539 (1)
10	California	1,095 (2)
11	Duke	1,056
12	Syracuse	1,035
13	Pittsburgh	1,016
14	Boston College	890 (1)
15	Wake Forest	784
16	Virginia	629
17	Stanford	477

=== Preseason ACC Player of the year ===
Ranking	Player	Position	Team	Votes
1	Cam Ward	QB	Miami (FL)	71
2	Omarion Hampton	RB	North Carolina	38
3	Barrett Carter	LB	Clemson	15
4	Kyron Drones	QB	Virginia Tech	13
5	Haynes King	QB	Georgia Tech	12
6	Jaydn Ott	RB	California	8
7	Ashton Gillotte	DL	Louisville	5
8	Jordan Moore	WR	Duke	3
9	Preston Stone	QB	SMU	2
9	Bhayshul Tuten	RB	Virginia Tech	2
11	Antwaun Powell-Ryland	DL	Virginia Tech	1

=== Preseason all-conference teams ===
==== Offense ====
Position	Player	School	Votes
Quarterback	Cam Ward	Miami	85
Running back	Omarion Hampton	North Carolina	114
Running back	Jaydn Ott	California	70
Wide receiver	Kevin Concepcion	NC State	119
Wide receiver	Xavier Restrepo	Miami	93
Wide receiver	Elic Ayomanor	Stanford	42
Tight end	Oronde Gadsden II	Syracuse	48
All-Purpose	Jaydn Ott	California	49
Tackle	Darius Washington	Florida State	93
Tackle	Blake Miller	Clemson	53
Guard	Willie Lampkin	North Carolina	64
Guard	Michael Gonzalez	Louisville	56
Center	Maurice Smith	Florida State	62

==== Defense ====
Position	Player	School	Votes
Defensive end	Ashton Gillotte	Louisville	52
Defensive end	Rueben Bain Jr.	Miami	49
Defensive tackle	Joshua Farmer	Florida State	75
Defensive tackle	Aeneas Peebles	Virginia Tech	64
Linebacker	Barrett Carter	Clemson	129
Linebacker	Francisco Mauigoa	Miami	72
Linebacker	Marlowe Wax	Syracuse	67
Cornerback	Dorian Strong	Virginia Tech	65
Cornerback	Aydan White	NC State	56
Safety	Jonas Sanker	Virginia	73
Safety	R.J. Mickens	Clemson	44

==== Specialist ====
Position	Player	School	Votes
Placekicker	Andy Borregales	Miami	92
Punter	Alex Mastromanno	Florida State	81
Specialist	Brashard Smith	SMU	36

=== Preseason awards ===
==== All–American Teams ====
	AP 1st Team	AP 2nd Team	AS 1st Team	AS 2nd Team	AS 3rd Team	AS 4th Team	WCFF 1st Team	WCFF 2nd Team	ESPN	CBS 1st Team	SN 1st Team	SN 2nd Team	USAT 1st Team	USAT 2nd Team	SI 1st Team	SI 2nd Team
Andrés Borregales, K, Miami (FL)		✓		✓		✓		✓		✓				✓		
Barrett Carter, LB, Clemson	✓		✓			✓	✓			✓		✓		✓	✓	
Kevin Concepcion, WR, NC State																✓
Ashton Gillotte, DL, Louisville	✓			✓	✓				✓			✓	✓			
Omarion Hampton, RB, North Carolina	✓			✓	✓		✓		✓		✓			✓		✓
Tucker Holloway, PR, Virginia Tech												✓				
Alex Mastromanno, P, Florida State	✓		✓		✓		✓		✓		✓		✓		✓	
Bryson Nesbit, TE, North Carolina						✓										
Marlowe Wax, LB, Syracuse																✓
Peter Woods, DE, Clemson						✓		✓								

==== Preseason award watchlists ====
Award	Head Coach/Player	School	Position	Year	Ref
Lott Trophy	Rueben Bain Jr.	Miami	DL	So.	
Lott Trophy	Barrett Carter	Clemson	LB	Sr.	
Lott Trophy	Tre Freeman	Duke	LB	Jr.	
Lott Trophy	Ashton Gillotte	Louisville	DE	Sr.	
Lott Trophy	Kaimon Rucker	North Carolina	DE	GS	
Lott Trophy	Marlowe Wax	Syracuse	LB	Sr.	
Dodd Trophy	Dabo Swinney	Clemson	HC		
Dodd Trophy	Mike Norvell	Florida State	HC		
Dodd Trophy	Jeff Brohm	Louisville	HC		
Dodd Trophy	Mario Cristobal	Miami	HC		
Dodd Trophy	Dave Doeren	NC State	HC		
Dodd Trophy	Brent Pry	Virginia Tech	HC		
Maxwell Award	Thomas Castellanos	Boston College	QB	Jr.	
Maxwell Award	Jaydn Ott	California	RB	Jr.	
Maxwell Award	Cade Klubnik	Clemson	QB	Jr.	
Maxwell Award	Phil Mafah	Clemson	RB	Sr.	
Maxwell Award	Jordan Moore	Duke	WR	Sr.	
Maxwell Award	DJ Uiagalelei	Florida State	QB	(redshirt) Sr.	
Maxwell Award	Haynes King	Georgia Tech	QB	Jr.	
Maxwell Award	Jamal Haynes	Georgia Tech	RB	(redshirt) Jr.	
Maxwell Award	Tyler Shough	Louisville	QB	Sr.	
Maxwell Award	Damien Martinez	Miami	RB	Jr.	
Maxwell Award	Xavier Restrepo	Miami	WR	Sr.	
Maxwell Award	Cam Ward	Miami	QB	Sr.	
Maxwell Award	Grayson McCall	NC State	QB	Sr.	
Maxwell Award	Omarion Hampton	North Carolina	RB	Jr.	
Maxwell Award	Preston Stone	SMU	QB	(redshirt) Jr.	
Maxwell Award	Elic Ayomanor	Stanford	WR	(redshirt) So.	
Maxwell Award	Kyle McCord	Syracuse	QB	Sr.	
Maxwell Award	LeQuint Allen	Syracuse	RB	Jr.	
Maxwell Award	Kyron Drones	Virginia Tech	QB	Jr.	
Maxwell Award	Bhayshul Tuten	Virginia Tech	RB	Sr.	
Davey O'Brien Award	Cade Klubnik	Clemson	QB	Jr.	
Davey O'Brien Award	DJ Uiagalelei	Florida State	QB	(redshirt) Sr.	
Davey O'Brien Award	Haynes King	Georgia Tech	QB	(redshirt) Jr.	
Davey O'Brien Award	Cam Ward	Miami	QB	Sr.	
Davey O'Brien Award	Grayson McCall	NC State	QB	GS	
Davey O'Brien Award	Preston Stone	SMU	QB	(redshirt) Jr.	
Davey O'Brien Award	Kyle McCord	Syracuse	QB	Sr.	
Davey O'Brien Award	Kyron Drones	Virginia Tech	QB	(redshirt) Jr.	
Doak Walker Award	Kye Robichaux	Boston College	RB	Sr.	
Doak Walker Award	Jaydn Ott	California	RB	Jr.	
Doak Walker Award	Phil Mafah	Clemson	RB	Sr.	
Doak Walker Award	Jaquez Moore	Duke	RB	Sr.	
Doak Walker Award	Jamal Haynes	Georgia Tech	RB	(redshirt) Jr.	
Doak Walker Award	Donald Chaney	Louisville	RB	Jr.	
Doak Walker Award	Damien Martinez	Miami	RB	Jr.	
Doak Walker Award	Omarion Hampton	North Carolina	RB	Jr.	
Doak Walker Award	Jordan Waters	NC State	RB	GS	
Doak Walker Award	Rodney Hammond	Pittsburgh	RB	Sr.	
Doak Walker Award	Jaylan Knighton	SMU	RB	GS	
Doak Walker Award	Ryan Butler	Stanford	RB	Jr.	
Doak Walker Award	LeQuint Allen	Syracuse	RB	Jr.	
Doak Walker Award	Bhayshul Tuten	Virginia Tech	RB	Sr.	
Doak Walker Award	Demond Claiborne	Wake Forest	RB	Jr.	
Biletnikoff Award	Jordan Moore	Duke	WR	GS	
Biletnikoff Award	Caullin Lacy	Louisville	WR	GS	
Biletnikoff Award	Samuel Brown	Miami	WR	(redshirt) Sr.	
Biletnikoff Award	Jacolby George	Miami	WR	Sr.	
Biletnikoff Award	Xavier Restrepo	Miami	WR	(redshirt) Sr.	
Biletnikoff Award	Kevin Concepcion	NC State	WR	So.	
Biletnikoff Award	Elic Ayomanor	Stanford	WR	(redshirt) So.	
Biletnikoff Award	Malachi Fields	Virginia	WR	Sr.	
John Mackey Award	Jack Endries	California	TE	So.	
John Mackey Award	Jake Briningstool	Clemson	TE	Sr.	
John Mackey Award	Kyle Morlock	Florida State	TE	(redshirt) Sr.	
John Mackey Award	Mark Redman	Louisville	TE	Sr.	
John Mackey Award	John Copenhaver	North Carolina	TE	GS	
John Mackey Award	Bryson Nesbit	North Carolina	TE	Sr.	
John Mackey Award	Justin Joly	NC State	TE	Jr.	
John Mackey Award	Gavin Bartholomew	Pittsburgh	TE	Sr.	
John Mackey Award	RJ Maryland	SMU	TE	Jr.	
John Mackey Award	Sam Roush	Stanford	TE	Jr.	
John Mackey Award	Nick Gallo	Virginia Tech	TE	GS	
Rimington Trophy	Drew Kendall	Boston College	C	(redshirt) Jr.	
Rimington Trophy	Maurice Smith	Florida State	C	(redshirt) Sr.	
Rimington Trophy	Weston Franklin	Georgia Tech	C	Sr.	
Rimington Trophy	Pete Nygra	Louisville	C	(redshirt) Jr.	
Rimington Trophy	Zeke Correll	NC State	C	GS	
Rimington Trophy	Justin Osborne	SMU	C	GS	
Rimington Trophy	Levi Rogers	Stanford	C	(redshirt) Sr.	
Rimington Trophy	Brian Stevens	Virginia	C	GS	
Rimington Trophy	Luke Petitbon	Wake Forest	C	Jr.	

Award	Head Coach/Player	School	Position	Year	Ref
Butkus Award	Barrett Carter	Clemson	LB	Sr.	
Butkus Award	Francisco Mauigoa	Miami	LB	Sr.	
Butkus Award	Sean Brown	NC State	LB	Jr.	
Butkus Award	Power Echols	North Carolina	LB	Sr.	
Butkus Award	Gaethan Bernadel	Stanford	LB	Sr.	
Butkus Award	Marlowe Wax	Syracuse	LB	Sr.	
Butkus Award	Sam Brumfield	Virginia Tech	LB	(redshirt) Sr.	
Jim Thorpe Award	Shyheim Brown	Florida State	DB	(redshirt) Jr.	
Jim Thorpe Award	Quincy Riley	Louisville	DB	(redshirt) Sr.	
Jim Thorpe Award	Aydan White	NC State	CB	Sr.	
Jim Thorpe Award	Donovan McMillon	Pittsburgh	DB	Sr.	
Jim Thorpe Award	Jonas Sanker	Virginia	S	Sr.	
Bronko Nagurski Trophy	Peter Woods	Clemson	DE	So.	
Bronko Nagurski Trophy	Joshua Farmer	Florida State	DT	(redshirt) Jr.	
Bronko Nagurski Trophy	Ashton Gillotte	Louisville	DE	Sr.	
Bronko Nagurski Trophy	Francisco Mauigoa	Miami	LB	Sr.	
Bronko Nagurski Trophy	Kaimon Rucker	North Carolina	DE	GS	
Bronko Nagurski Trophy	Jonas Sanker	Virginia	S	Sr.	
Bronko Nagurski Trophy	Aeneas Peebles	Virginia Tech	DT	GS	
Outland Trophy	Ozzy Trapilo	Boston College	OT	(redshirt) Sr.	
Outland Trophy	Blake Miller	Clemson	OT	Jr.	
Outland Trophy	Joshua Farmer	Florida State	DT	(redshirt) Jr.	
Outland Trophy	Darius Washington	Florida State	OT	(redshirt) Sr.	
Outland Trophy	Weston Franklin	Georgia Tech	C	Sr.	
Outland Trophy	Michael Gonzalez	Louisville	OG	Sr.	
Outland Trophy	Jalen Rivers	Miami	OT	Jr.	
Outland Trophy	Zeke Correll	NC State	C	GS	
Outland Trophy	Justin Osborne	SMU	C	GS	
Lou Groza Award	Todd Pelino	Duke	PK	Jr.	
Lou Groza Award	Ryan Fitzgerald	Florida State	PK	Sr.	
Lou Groza Award	Aidan Birr	Georgia Tech	PK	So.	
Lou Groza Award	Andrés Borregales	Miami	PK	Sr.	
Lou Groza Award	Noah Burnette	North Carolina	PK	Sr.	
Lou Groza Award	Will Bettridge	Virginia	PK	Jr.	
Lou Groza Award	John Love	Virginia Tech	PK	So.	
Ray Guy Award	Lachlan Wilson	California	P	Sr.	
Ray Guy Award	Alex Mastromanno	Florida State	P	(redshirt) Sr.	
Ray Guy Award	Daniel Sparks	Virginia	P	GS	
Ray Guy Award	Peter Moore	Virginia Tech	P	(redshirt) Sr.	
Ray Guy Award	Ivan Mora	Wake Forest	P	(redshirt) Sr.	
Paul Hornung Award	Jayden McGowan	Boston College	WR	Jr.	
Paul Hornung Award	Jaydn Ott	California	RB	Jr.	
Paul Hornung Award	Jamal Haynes	Georgia Tech	RB	(redshirt) Jr.	
Paul Hornung Award	Caullin Lacy	Louisville	WR	Sr.	
Paul Hornung Award	Alijah Huzzie	North Carolina	DB	GS	
Paul Hornung Award	Kenny Johnson	Pittsburgh	WR	So.	
Paul Hornung Award	Trebor Pena	Syracuse	WR	(redshirt) Jr.	
Paul Hornung Award	Bhayshul Tuten	Virginia Tech	RB	Sr.	
Wuerffel Trophy	Donovan Ezeiruaku	Boston College	DE	Sr.	
Wuerffel Trophy	Jaydn Ott	California	RB	Jr.	
Wuerffel Trophy	Barrett Carter	Clemson	LB	Sr.	
Wuerffel Trophy	Maurice Smith	Florida State	OL	Sr.	
Wuerffel Trophy	Clayton Powell-Lee	Georgia Tech	DB	Jr.	
Wuerffel Trophy	Ashton Gillotte	Louisville	DL	Sr.	
Wuerffel Trophy	Jaden Harris	Miami	DB	So.	
Wuerffel Trophy	Kaimon Rucker	North Carolina	DE	GS	
Wuerffel Trophy	Brandon Cleveland	NC State	DT	Jr.	
Wuerffel Trophy	Brandon George	Pittsburgh	DL	GS	
Wuerffel Trophy	Johnathan McGill	SMU	S	GS	
Wuerffel Trophy	Tristan Sinclair	Stanford	ILB	GS	
Wuerffel Trophy	Justin Barron	Syracuse	DB	Sr.	
Wuerffel Trophy	Will Bettridge	Virginia	PK	Jr.	
Wuerffel Trophy	Jaylin Lane	Virginia Tech	WR	GS	
Wuerffel Trophy	Justin Cody	Wake Forest	DL	Sr.	
Walter Camp Award	DJ Uiagalelei	Florida State	QB	(redshirt) Sr.	
Walter Camp Award	Jamal Haynes	Georgia Tech	RB	(redshirt) Jr.	
Walter Camp Award	Cam Ward	Miami	QB	Sr.	
Walter Camp Award	Omarion Hampton	North Carolina	RB	Jr.	
Walter Camp Award	Grayson McCall	NC State	GS	QB	
Walter Camp Award	Elic Ayomanor	Stanford	WR	(redshirt) So.	
Walter Camp Award	Kyle McCord	Syracuse	QB	Sr.	
Jet Award	Brashard Smith	SMU	RB	Sr.	
Jet Award	Tucker Holloway	Virginia Tech	WR	Jr.	
Jet Award	Bhayshul Tuten	Virginia Tech	RB	Sr.	
Patrick Mannelly Award	Philip Florenzo	Clemson	LS	Sr.	

Award	Head Coach/Player	School	Position	Year	Ref
Bednarik Award	Barrett Carter	Clemson	LB	Sr.	
Bednarik Award	Peter Woods	Clemson	DT	So.	
Bednarik Award	Tre Freeman	Duke	LB	(redshirt) Jr.	
Bednarik Award	Joshua Farmer	Florida State	DT	(redshirt) Jr.	
Bednarik Award	Patrick Payton	Florida State	DE	(redshirt) Jr.	
Bednarik Award	Ashton Gillotte	Louisville	DE	Sr.	
Bednarik Award	Quincy Riley	Louisville	CB	(redshirt) Sr.	
Bednarik Award	Rueben Bain Jr.	Miami	DE	So.	
Bednarik Award	Francisco Mauigoa	Miami	LB	Sr.	
Bednarik Award	Power Echols	North Carolina	LB	Sr.	
Bednarik Award	Kaimon Rucker	North Carolina	DE	GS	
Bednarik Award	Davin Vann	NC State	DE	Sr.	
Bednarik Award	Donovan McMillon	Pittsburgh	S	Sr.	
Bednarik Award	Elijah Roberts	SMU	DE	Sr.	
Bednarik Award	Marlowe Wax	Syracuse	LB	Sr.	
Bednarik Award	Jonas Sanker	Virginia	S	Sr.	
Bednarik Award	Aeneas Peebles	Virginia Tech	DT	GS.	
Bednarik Award	Antwaun Powell-Ryland	Virginia Tech	DE	(redshirt) Sr.	
Bednarik Award	Jasheen Davis	Wake Forest	DE	Sr.	
Rotary Lombardi Award	Barrett Carter	Clemson	LB	Sr.	
Rotary Lombardi Award	Blake Miller	Clemson	OT	Jr.	
Rotary Lombardi Award	Peter Woods	Clemson	DT	So.	
Rotary Lombardi Award	Patrick Payton	Florida State	DE	(redshirt) Jr.	
Rotary Lombardi Award	Darius Washington	Florida State	OT	(redshirt) Sr.	
Rotary Lombardi Award	Ashton Gillotte	Louisville	DE	Sr.	
Rotary Lombardi Award	Rueben Bain Jr.	Miami	DE	So.	
Rotary Lombardi Award	Kaimon Rucker	North Carolina	DE	GS	
Rotary Lombardi Award	Logan Parr	SMU	OG	Sr.	
Rotary Lombardi Award	Aeneas Peebles	Virginia Tech	DT	GS	
Rotary Lombardi Award	Antwaun Powell-Ryland	Virginia Tech	DE	(redshirt) Sr.	
Polynesian Football Player of the Year Award	Aidan Keanaaina	California	DL	Jr.	
Polynesian Football Player of the Year Award	Jaydn Ott	California	RB	Jr.	
Polynesian Football Player of the Year Award	Cade Uluave	California	LB	Fr.	
Polynesian Football Player of the Year Award	Sioape Vatikani	California	OL	Jr.	
Polynesian Football Player of the Year Award	Sione Lolohea	Florida State	DL	(redshirt) Sr.	
Polynesian Football Player of the Year Award	Lawrance Toafili	Florida State	RB	(redshirt) Sr.	
Polynesian Football Player of the Year Award	DJ Uiagalelei	Florida State	QB	(redshirt) Sr.	
Polynesian Football Player of the Year Award	Francis Mauigoa	Miami	OT	So.	
Polynesian Football Player of the Year Award	Francisco Mauigoa	Miami	LB	Jr.	
Polynesian Football Player of the Year Award	Simione Pale	Stanford	OL	So.	
Polynesian Football Player of the Year Award	Josh Ilaoa	Syracuse	OL	Sr.	
Manning Award	Thomas Castellanos	Boston College	QB	Jr.	
Manning Award	Cade Klubnik	Clemson	QB	Jr.	
Manning Award	Haynes King	Georgia Tech	QB	(redshirt) Jr.	
Manning Award	Preston Stone	SMU	QB	(redshirt) Jr.	
Manning Award	Kyron Drones	Virginia Tech	QB	(redshirt) Jr.	
Johnny Unitas Golden Arm Award	Thomas Castellanos	Boston College	QB	Jr.	
Johnny Unitas Golden Arm Award	Fernando Mendoza	California	QB	(redshirt) So	
Johnny Unitas Golden Arm Award	Cade Klubnik	Clemson	QB	Jr.	
Johnny Unitas Golden Arm Award	DJ Uiagalelei	Florida State	QB	(redshirt) Sr.	
Johnny Unitas Golden Arm Award	Haynes King	Georgia Tech	QB	(redshirt) Jr.	
Johnny Unitas Golden Arm Award	Tyler Shough	Louisville	QB	(redshirt) Sr.	
Johnny Unitas Golden Arm Award	Cam Ward	Miami	QB	Sr.	
Johnny Unitas Golden Arm Award	Grayson McCall	NC State	QB	GS	
Johnny Unitas Golden Arm Award	Nate Yarnell	Pittsburgh	QB	(redshirt) Jr.	
Johnny Unitas Golden Arm Award	Preston Stone	SMU	QB	(redshirt) Jr.	
Johnny Unitas Golden Arm Award	Ashton Daniels	Stanford	QB	Jr.	
Johnny Unitas Golden Arm Award	Kyle McCord	Syracuse	QB	Sr.	
Johnny Unitas Golden Arm Award	Kyron Drones	Virginia Tech	QB	(redshirt) Jr.	
Earl Campbell Tyler Rose Award	Chandler Rogers	California	QB	(redshirt) Sr.	
Earl Campbell Tyler Rose Award	Cade Klubnik	Clemson	QB	Jr.	
Earl Campbell Tyler Rose Award	Jeremiah Byers	Florida State	OL	(redshirt) Sr.	
Earl Campbell Tyler Rose Award	Haynes King	Georgia Tech	QB	(redshirt) Jr.	
Earl Campbell Tyler Rose Award	Damien Martinez	Miami	RB	Jr.	
Earl Campbell Tyler Rose Award	Cam Ward	Miami	QB	Sr.	
Earl Campbell Tyler Rose Award	Nate Yarnell	Pittsburgh	QB	(redshirt) Jr.	
Earl Campbell Tyler Rose Award	Preston Stone	SMU	QB	(redshirt) Jr.	
Earl Campbell Tyler Rose Award	J'Onre Reed	Syracuse	C	Sr.	
Earl Campbell Tyler Rose Award	Kyron Drones	Virginia Tech	QB	(redshirt) Jr.	

== Head coaches ==
=== Pre-season changes ===
Syracuse head coach Dino Babers was fired during the 2023 season. On November 28, 2023, Georgia defensive backs coach, Fran Brown, was hired as his replacement.

Texas A&M hired Duke head coach Mike Elko to replace Jimbo Fisher. On December 7, 2023, he was replaced by Manny Diaz, Penn State's defensive coordinator and linebackers coach.

Boston College's Jeff Hafley was hired as the Green Bay Packers defensive coordinator on January 31, 2024. On February 9, 2024, Bill O'Brien was announced as Boston College's new head coach.

=== Head coaching records ===
Team	Head coach	Years at school	Overall record	Record at school	ACC record
Boston College	Bill O'Brien	1	15–9	0–0	0–0
California	Justin Wilcox	8	36–43	36–43	0–0
Clemson	Dabo Swinney	16	170–43	170–43	103–23
Duke	Manny Diaz	1	21–15	0–0	16–9
Florida State	Mike Norvell	5	69–32	31–17	19–13
Georgia Tech	Brent Key	3	11–10	11–10	9–6
Louisville	Jeff Brohm	2	76–48	10–4	7–1
Miami	Mario Cristobal	3	74–73	12–13	6–10
North Carolina	Mack Brown	16	282–149–1	107–73–1	64–53–1
NC State	Dave Doeren	12	104–62	81–58	44–46
Pittsburgh	Pat Narduzzi	10	65–50	65–50	43–31
SMU	Rhett Lashlee	3	18–9	18–9	0–0
Stanford	Troy Taylor	2	33–17	3–9	0–0
Syracuse	Fran Brown	1	0–0	0–0	0–0
Virginia	Tony Elliot	3	6–16	6–16	3–12
Virginia Tech	Brent Pry	3	10–14	10–14	6–9
Wake Forest	Dave Clawson	11	153–141	63–61	30–49

== Rankings ==
Legend
	Improvement in ranking
	Drop in ranking
	Not ranked previous week
RV	Received votes but were not ranked in Top 25 of poll
т	Tied with team above or below also with this symbol

		Pre	Wk 1	Wk 2	Wk 3	Wk 4	Wk 5	Wk 6	Wk 7	Wk 8	Wk 9	Wk 10	Wk 11	Wk 12	Wk 13	Wk 14	Wk 15	Final
Boston College	AP	—	RV	24	RV	RV	RV	—	—	—	—	—	—	—	—	—	—	—
Boston College	C	—	RV	RV	RV	RV	RV	—	—	—	—	—	—	—	—	—	—	—
Boston College	CFP	Not released										—	—	—	—	—	—	
California	AP	—	—	RV	RV	—	—	—	—	—	—	—	—	—	—	—	—	—
California	C	—	—	RV	RV	—	—	—	—	—	—	—	—	—	—	—	—	—
California	CFP	Not released										—	—	—	—	—	—	
Clemson	AP	14	25	22	21	17	15	10	10	9	11т	19	17	17	12	18	13	14
Clemson	C	14	22	20	19	15	14	11	9	9	8	17	16	16	12	17	13	11т
Clemson	CFP	Not released										23	20	17	12	17	16	
Duke	AP	—	—	—	—	—	—	—	—	—	—	—	—	RV	RV	RV	RV	—
Duke	C	—	—	—	—	RV	RV	—	—	RV	RV	—	RV	RV	RV	RV	RV	—
Duke	CFP	Not released										—	—	—	—	—	—	
Florida State	AP	10	—	—	—	—	—	—	—	—	—	—	—	—	—	—	—	—
Florida State	C	10	—	—	—	—	—	—	—	—	—	—	—	—	—	—	—	—
Florida State	CFP	Not released										—	—	—	—	—	—	
Georgia Tech	AP	—	23	—	—	—	—	—	—	—	—	—	—	RV	RV	—	—	—
Georgia Tech	C	—	RV	—	—	—	—	—	—	—	—	—	—	—	RV	RV	RV	—
Georgia Tech	CFP	Not released										—	—	—	—	—	—	
Louisville	AP	RV	22	19	19	15	22	RV	RV	—	RV	25	22	RV	RV	RV	RV	RV
Louisville	C	RV	24	21	20	17	22	RV	RV	—	RV	RV	24	RV	RV	RV	RV	RV
Louisville	CFP	Not released										22	19	—	—	—	—	
Miami	AP	19	12	10	8	7	8	6	6	6	5	4	12	11	8	14	15	18
Miami	C	19	15	12	11	9	8	6	6	5	5	4	12	10	7	14	16	18
Miami	CFP	Not released										4	9	8	6	12	13	
North Carolina	AP	—	RV	RV	RV	—	—	—	—	—	—	—	—	—	—	—	—	—
North Carolina	C	RV	RV	RV	RV	—	—	—	—	—	—	—	—	—	—	—	—	—
North Carolina	CFP	Not released										—	—	—	—	—	—	
NC State	AP	24	24	—	—	—	—	—	—	—	—	—	—	—	—	—	—	—
NC State	C	22	23	RV	RV	—	—	—	—	—	—	—	—	—	—	—	—	—
NC State	CFP	Not released										—	—	—	—	—	—	
Pittsburgh	AP	—	—	—	RV	RV	RV	22	20	19	18	23	RV	RV	—	—	—	—
Pittsburgh	C	—	—	RV	RV	RV	RV	24	20	20	17	23	RV	RV	—	—	—	—
Pittsburgh	CFP	Not released										18	—	—	—	—	—	
SMU	AP	RV	RV	—	—	RV	RV	25	21	22	20	13	14	13	9	8	12	12
SMU	C	RV	RV	—	—	RV	RV	25	23	22	20	15	13	12	9	7	12	11т
SMU	CFP	Not released										13	14	13	9	8	10	
Stanford	AP	—	—	—	—	—	—	—	—	—	—	—	—	—	—	—	—	—
Stanford	C	—	—	—	—	—	—	—	—	—	—	—	—	—	—	—	—	—
Stanford	CFP	Not released										—	—	—	—	—	—	
Syracuse	AP	—	—	RV	RV	—	—	RV	RV	RV	—	—	—	RV	RV	23	22	20
Syracuse	C	RV	RV	RV	RV	—	—	RV	RV	RV	—	RV	—	RV	RV	25	25	22
Syracuse	CFP	Not released										—	—	—	—	22	21	
Virginia	AP	—	—	—	—	—	—	—	—	—	—	—	—	—	—	—	—	—
Virginia	C	—	—	—	—	—	—	RV	—	—	—	—	—	—	—	—	—	—
Virginia	CFP	Not released										—	—	—	—	—	—	
Virginia Tech	AP	RV	—	—	—	—	—	—	—	—	—	—	—	—	—	—	—	—
Virginia Tech	C	RV	—	—	—	—	—	—	—	—	RV	—	—	—	—	—	—	—
Virginia Tech	CFP	Not released										—	—	—	—	—	—	
Wake Forest	AP	—	—	—	—	—	—	—	—	—	—	—	—	—	—	—	—	—
Wake Forest	C	—	—	—	—	—	—	—	—	—	—	—	—	—	—	—	—	—
Wake Forest	CFP	Not released										—	—	—	—	—	—	

== Schedule ==
The schedule was released on January 24, 2024. The season began on August 29, 2024, but three ACC teams played games in Week 0. The regular season ended with the ACC Championship Game on December 7, 2024.

=== Regular season ===
==== Week Zero ====
Date	Time	Visiting team	Home team	Site	TV	Result	Attendance	Ref.
August 24	Noon	No. 10 Florida State	Georgia Tech	Aviva Stadium • Dublin, Ireland (Aer Lingus College Football Classic)	ESPN	GT 24–21	47,998	
August 24	8:00 p.m.	SMU	Nevada	Mackay Stadium • Reno, NV	CBSSN	W 29–24	20,263	
^{#}Rankings from AP Poll released prior to game. All times are in Eastern Time.

==== Week One ====
Date	Time	Visiting team	Home team	Site	TV	Result	Attendance	Ref.
August 29	7:00 p.m.	No. 20 (FCS) Western Carolina	No. 24 NC State	Carter–Finley Stadium • Raleigh, NC	ACCN	W 38–21	56,919	
August 29	7:00 p.m.	North Carolina A&T	Wake Forest	Allegacy Federal Credit Union Stadium • Winston-Salem, NC	ESPN+/ACCNX	W 45–13	29,450	
August 29	8:00 p.m.	North Carolina	Minnesota	Huntington Bank Stadium • Minneapolis, MN	FOX	W 19–17	50,805	
August 30	7:30 p.m.	Elon	Duke	Wallace Wade Stadium • Durham, NC	ACCN	W 26–3	18,466	
August 30	10:30 p.m.	TCU	Stanford	Stanford Stadium • Stanford, CA	ESPN	L 27–34	36,026	
August 31	Noon	No. 14 Clemson	No. 1 Georgia	Mercedes-Benz Stadium • Atlanta, GA (rivalry)	ABC	L 3–34	78,827	
August 31	Noon	Virginia Tech	Vanderbilt	FirstBank Stadium • Nashville, TN	ESPN	L 27–34 ^{OT}	28,934	
August 31	Noon	Kent State	Pittsburgh	Acrisure Stadium • Pittsburgh, PA	ESPNU	W 55–24	44,616	
August 31	Noon	Austin Peay	Louisville	L&N Federal Credit Union Stadium • Louisville, KY	ACCN	W 62–0	47,067	
August 31	3:30 p.m.	No. 19 Miami	Florida	Ben Hill Griffin Stadium • Gainesville, FL (rivalry)	ABC	W 41–17	90,544	
August 31	3:30 p.m.	Ohio	Syracuse	JMA Wireless Dome • Syracuse, NY	ACCN	W 38–22	37,225	
August 31	5:00 p.m.	No. 18 (FCS) UC Davis	California	California Memorial Stadium • Berkeley, CA	ESPN+/ACCNX	W 31–13	32,275	
August 31	6:00 p.m.	No. 13 (FCS) Richmond	Virginia	Scott Stadium • Charlottesville, VA	ESPN+/ACCNX	W 34–13	40,811	
August 31	8:00 p.m.	Georgia State	Georgia Tech	Bobby Dodd Stadium • Atlanta, GA	ACCN	W 35–12	40,113	
August 31	8:00 p.m.	Houston Christian	SMU	Gerald J. Ford Stadium • University Park, TX	ESPN+/ACCNX	W 59–7	27,080	
September 2	7:30 p.m.	Boston College	No. 10 Florida State	Doak Campbell Stadium • Tallahassee, FL	ESPN	BC 28–13	51,719	
^{#}Rankings from AP Poll released prior to game. All times are in Eastern Time.

==== Week Two ====
Date	Time	Visiting team	Home team	Site	TV	Result	Attendance	Ref.
September 6	7:00 p.m.	BYU	SMU	Gerald J. Ford Stadium • University Park, TX	ESPN2	L 15–18	31,172	
September 6	9:00 p.m.	Duke	Northwestern	Martin Stadium • Evanston, IL	FS1	W 26–20 ^{2OT}	11,062	
September 7	Noon	Pittsburgh	Cincinnati	Nippert Stadium • Cincinnati, OH	ESPN2	W 28–27	37,992	
September 7	Noon	No. 23 Georgia Tech	Syracuse	JMA Wireless Dome • Syracuse, NY	ACCN	SYR 31–28	39,550	
September 7	3:30 p.m.	California	Auburn	Jordan-Hare Stadium • Auburn, AL	ESPN2	W 21–14	88,043	
September 7	3:30 p.m.	Charlotte	North Carolina	Kenan Memorial Stadium • Chapel Hill, NC	ACCN	W 38–20	48,431	
September 7	3:30 p.m.	Duquesne	Boston College	Alumni Stadium • Chestnut Hill, MA	ESPN+/ACCNX	W 56–0	38,441	
September 7	3:30 p.m.	Jacksonville State	No. 22 Louisville	L&N Federal Credit Union Stadium • Louisville, KY	ESPN+/ACCNX	W 49–14	48,575	
September 7	4:30 p.m.	Marshall	Virginia Tech	Lane Stadium • Blacksburg, VA	CW	W 31–14	65,632	
September 7	6:00 p.m.	Florida A&M	No. 12 Miami	Hard Rock Stadium • Miami Gardens, FL	ESPN+/ACCNX	W 56–9	57,886	
September 7	7:00 p.m.	Virginia	Wake Forest	Allegacy Federal Credit Union Stadium • Winston-Salem, NC	ESPN2	UVA 31–30	30,012	
September 7	7:00 p.m.	Cal Poly	Stanford	Stanford Stadium • Stanford, CA	ESPN+/ACCNX	W 41–7	22,634	
September 7	7:30 p.m.	No. 24 NC State	No. 14 Tennessee	Bank of America Stadium • Charlotte, NC (Duke's Mayo Classic)	ABC	L 10–51	72,730	
September 7	8:00 p.m.	Appalachian State	No. 25 Clemson	Memorial Stadium • Clemson, SC	ACCN	W 66–20	81,500	
^{#}Rankings from AP Poll released prior to game. All times are in Eastern Time.

Date	Bye Week
September 7	Florida State

==== Week Three ====
Date	Time	Visiting team	Home team	Site	TV	Result	Attendance	Ref.
September 14	Noon	Memphis	Florida State	Doak Campbell Stadium • Tallahassee, FL	ESPN	L 12–20	55,107	
September 14	Noon	Louisiana Tech	NC State	Carter–Finley Stadium • Raleigh, NC	ACCN	W 30–20	56,919	
September 14	12:45 p.m.	No. 24 Boston College	No. 6 Missouri	Faurot Field • Columbia, MO	SECN	L 21–27	62,621	
September 14	3:30 p.m.	West Virginia	Pittsburgh	Acrisure Stadium • Pittsburgh, PA (rivalry)	ESPN2	W 38–34	66,087	
September 14	3:30 p.m.	VMI	Georgia Tech	Bobby Dodd Stadium • Atlanta, GA	ESPN+/ACCNX	W 59–7	31,729	
September 14	5:55 p.m. (Note: Delayed from 3:30 p.m. due to weather)	Ball State	No. 10 Miami	Hard Rock Stadium • Miami Gardens, FL	ACCN	W 62–0	51,564	
September 14	6:00 p.m.	NC Central	North Carolina	Kenan Memorial Stadium • Chapel Hill, NC	ESPN+/ACCNX	W 45–10	45,491	
September 14	6:00 p.m.	UConn	Duke	Wallace Wade Stadium • Durham, NC	ESPN+/ACCNX	W 26–21	20,174	
September 14	6:00 p.m.	Virginia Tech	Old Dominion	S.B. Ballard Stadium • Norfolk, VA	ESPN+	W 37–17	22,208	
September 14	6:30 p.m.	No. 5 Ole Miss	Wake Forest	Allegacy Federal Credit Union Stadium • Winston-Salem, NC	CW	L 40–6	32,849	
September 14	8:00 p.m.	Maryland	Virginia	Scott Stadium • Charlottesville, VA (rivalry)	ACCN	L 13–27	41,352	
September 14	10:30 p.m.	San Diego State	California	California Memorial Stadium • Berkeley, CA	ESPN	W 31–10	35,197	
^{#}Rankings from AP Poll released prior to game. All times are in Eastern Time.

Date	Bye Week				
September 14	No. 22 Clemson	No. 19 Louisville	SMU	Stanford	Syracuse

==== Week Four ====
Date	Time	Visiting team	Home team	Site	TV	Result	Attendance	Ref.
September 20	7:30 p.m.	Stanford	Syracuse	JMA Wireless Dome • Syracuse, NY	ESPN	STAN 26–23	39,290	
September 21	Noon	NC State	No. 21 Clemson	Memorial Stadium • Clemson, SC (Textile Bowl)	ABC	CLEM 59–35	81,500	
September 21	Noon	James Madison	North Carolina	Kenan Memorial Stadium • Chapel Hill, NC	ACCN	L 50–70	50,500	
September 21	2:00 p.m.	Virginia	Coastal Carolina	Brooks Stadium • Conway, SC	ESPN+	W 43–24	22,104	
September 21	3:30 p.m.	Georgia Tech	No. 19 Louisville	L&N Federal Credit Union Stadium • Louisville, KY	ESPN2	LOU 31–19	50,727	
September 21	3:30 p.m.	Rutgers	Virginia Tech	Lane Stadium • Blacksburg, VA	ACCN	L 23–26	65,632	
September 21	3:30 p.m.	Youngstown State	Pittsburgh	Acrisure Stadium • Pittsburgh, PA	ESPN+/ACCNX	W 73–17	48,437	
September 21	4:00 p.m.	Duke	Middle Tennessee	Johnny "Red" Floyd Stadium • Murfreesboro, TN	ESPNU	W 45–17	15,209	
September 21	5:00 p.m.	TCU	SMU	Gerald J. Ford Stadium • University Park, TX (rivalry)	CW	W 66–42	33,168	
September 21	7:00 p.m.	No. 8 Miami	South Florida	Raymond James Stadium • Tampa, FL	ESPN	W 50–15	58,616	
September 21	7:00 p.m.	California	Florida State	Doak Campbell Stadium • Tallahassee, FL	ESPN2	FSU 14–9	55,107	
September 21	8:00 p.m.	Michigan State	Boston College	Alumni Stadium • Chestnut Hill, MA	ACCN	W 23–19	44,500	
^{#}Rankings from AP Poll released prior to game. All times are in Eastern Time.

Date	Bye Week
September 21	Wake Forest

==== Week Five ====
Date	Time	Visiting team	Home team	Site	TV	Result	Attendance	Ref.
September 27	7:30 p.m.	Virginia Tech	No. 7 Miami	Hard Rock Stadium • Miami Gardens, FL (rivalry)	ESPN	MIA 38–34	59,539	
September 28	Noon	Western Kentucky	Boston College	Alumni Stadium • Chestnut Hill, MA	ACCN	W 21–20	41,403	
September 28	Noon	Holy Cross	Syracuse	JMA Wireless Dome • Syracuse, NY	ESPN+/ACCNX	W 42–14	43,455	
September 28	Noon	Northern Illinois	NC State	Carter–Finley Stadium • Raleigh, NC	CW	W 24–17	56,919	
September 28	3:30 p.m.	No. 15 Louisville	No. 16 Notre Dame	Notre Dame Stadium • Notre Dame, IN	Peacock	L 24–31	77,622	
September 28	3:30 p.m.	Louisiana	Wake Forest	Allegacy Federal Credit Union Stadium • Winston-Salem, NC	ACCN	L 38–41	31,061	
September 28	4:00 p.m.	North Carolina	Duke	Wallace Wade Stadium • Durham, NC (Victory Bell)	ESPN2	DUKE 21–20	35,018	
September 28	7:00 p.m.	Stanford	No. 17 Clemson	Memorial Stadium • Clemson, SC	ESPN	CLEM 40–14	80,295	
September 28	8:00 p.m.	Florida State	SMU	Gerald J. Ford Stadium • University Park, TX	ACCN	SMU 42–16	34,879	
^{#}Rankings from AP Poll released prior to game. All times are in Eastern Time.

Date	Bye Week			
September 28	California	Georgia Tech	Pittsburgh	Virginia

==== Week Six ====
Date	Time	Visiting team	Home team	Site	TV	Result	Attendance	Ref.
October 4	9:00 p.m.	Syracuse	No. 25 UNLV	Allegiant Stadium • Paradise, NV	FS1	W 44–41 ^{OT}	31,329	
October 5	Noon	Boston College	Virginia	Scott Stadium • Charlottesville, VA	ACCN	UVA 24–14	38,285	
October 5	Noon	Wake Forest	NC State	Carter–Finley Stadium • Raleigh, NC (rivalry)	CW	WF 34–30	56,919	
October 5	Noon	SMU	No. 22 Louisville	L&N Federal Credit Union Stadium • Louisville, KY	ESPN	SMU 34–27	50,254	
October 5	Noon	Pittsburgh	North Carolina	Kenan Memorial Stadium • Chapel Hill, NC	ESPN2	PITT 34–24	46,033	
October 5	3:30 p.m.	Virginia Tech	Stanford	Stanford Stadium • Stanford, CA	ACCN	VT 31–7	36,277	
October 5	7:00 p.m.	No. 15 Clemson	Florida State	Doak Campbell Stadium • Tallahassee, FL (rivalry)	ESPN	CLEM 29–13	55,107	
October 5	8:00 p.m.	Duke	Georgia Tech	Bobby Dodd Stadium • Atlanta, GA	ACCN	GT 24–14	37,287	
October 5	10:30 p.m.	No. 8 Miami	California	California Memorial Stadium • Berkeley, CA (College GameDay)	ESPN	MIA 39–38	52,428	
^{#}Rankings from AP Poll released prior to game. All times are in Eastern Time.

==== Week Seven ====
Date	Time	Visiting team	Home team	Site	TV	Result	Attendance	Ref.
October 12	Noon	No. 10 Clemson	Wake Forest	Allegacy Federal Credit Union Stadium • Winston-Salem, NC	ESPN	CLEM 49–14	31,553	
October 12	Noon	Georgia Tech	North Carolina	Kenan Memorial Stadium • Chapel Hill, NC	CW	GT 41–34	44,482	
October 12	3:30 p.m.	Stanford	No. 11 Notre Dame	Notre Dame Stadium • Notre Dame, IN (rivalry)	NBC	L 7–49	77,622	
October 12	3:30 p.m.	Louisville	Virginia	Scott Stadium • Charlottesville, VA	ACCN	LOU 24–20	32,688	
October 12	3:30 p.m.	California	No. 22 Pittsburgh	Acrisure Stadium • Pittsburgh, PA	ESPN	PITT 17–15	49,773	
October 12	8:00 p.m.	Syracuse	NC State	Carter–Finley Stadium • Raleigh, NC	ACCN	SYR 24–17	56,919	
^{#}Rankings from AP Poll released prior to game. All times are in Eastern Time.

Date	Bye Week					
October 12	Boston College	Duke	Florida State	No. 6 Miami	No. 25 SMU	Virginia Tech

==== Week Eight ====
Date	Time	Visiting team	Home team	Site	TV	Result	Attendance	Ref.
October 17	7:30 p.m.	Boston College	Virginia Tech	Lane Stadium • Blacksburg, VA (rivalry)	ESPN	VT 42–21	65,632	
October 18	7:00 p.m.	Florida State	Duke	Wallace Wade Stadium • Durham, NC	ESPN2	DUKE 23–16	30,735	
October 19	Noon	No. 6 Miami	Louisville	L&N Federal Credit Union Stadium • Louisville, KY	ABC	MIA 52–45	59,115	
October 19	Noon	Virginia	No. 10 Clemson	Memorial Stadium • Clemson, SC	ACCN	CLEM 48–31	80,100	
October 19	Noon	Wake Forest	UConn	Rentschler Field • East Hartford, CT	CBSSN	W 23–20	30,122	
October 19	3:30 p.m.	No. 12 Notre Dame	Georgia Tech	Mercedes-Benz Stadium • Atlanta, GA (rivalry)	ESPN	L 13–31	59,021	
October 19	3:30 p.m.	NC State	California	California Memorial Stadium • Berkeley, CA	ACCN	NCSU 24–23	35,303	
October 19	8:00 p.m.	No. 21 SMU	Stanford	Stanford Stadium • Stanford, CA	ACCN	SMU 40–10	19,117	
^{#}Rankings from AP Poll released prior to game. All times are in Eastern Time.

Date	Bye Week		
October 19	North Carolina	No. 20 Pittsburgh	Syracuse

==== Week Nine ====
Date	Time	Visiting team	Home team	Site	TV	Result	Attendance	Ref.
October 24	7:30 p.m.	Syracuse	No. 19 Pittsburgh	Acrisure Stadium • Pittsburgh, PA (rivalry)	ESPN	PITT 41–13	47,266	
October 25	7:30 p.m.	Louisville	Boston College	Alumni Stadium • Chestnut Hill, MA	ESPN2	LOU 31–27	42,887	
October 26	Noon	Georgia Tech	Virginia Tech	Lane Stadium • Blacksburg, VA (rivalry)	ACCN	VT 21–6	65,632	
October 26	Noon	North Carolina	Virginia	Scott Stadium • Charlottesville, VA (rivalry)	CW	UNC 41–14	44,550	
October 26	3:30 p.m.	Wake Forest	Stanford	Stanford Stadium • Stanford, CA	ACCN	WF 27–24	23,471	
October 26	4:00 p.m.	Oregon State	California	California Memorial Stadium • Berkeley, CA	ESPN2	W 44–7	33,090	
October 26	7:00 p.m.	Florida State	No. 6 Miami	Hard Rock Stadium • Miami Gardens, FL (rivalry)	ESPN	MIA 36–14	66,200	
October 26	8:00 p.m.	No. 22 SMU	Duke	Wallace Wade Stadium • Durham, NC	ACCN	SMU 28–27 ^{OT}	30,241	
^{#}Rankings from AP Poll. All times are in Eastern Time.

Date	Bye Week	
October 26	No. 9 Clemson	NC State

==== Week Ten ====
Date	Time	Visiting team	Home team	Site	TV	Result	Attendance	Ref.
November 2	Noon	Duke	No. 5 Miami	Hard Rock Stadium • Miami Gardens, FL	ABC	MIA 53–31	60,189	
November 2	Noon	Stanford	NC State	Carter–Finley Stadium • Raleigh, NC	ACCN	NCSU 59–28	56,919	
November 2	Noon	Virginia Tech	Syracuse	JMA Wireless Dome • Syracuse, NY	CW	SYR 38–31 ^{OT}	38,454	
November 2	3:30 p.m.	North Carolina	Florida State	Doak Campbell Stadium • Tallahassee, Florida	ACCN	UNC 35–11	55,107	
November 2	7:30 p.m.	Louisville	No. 11 Clemson	Memorial Stadium • Clemson, SC	ESPN	LOU 33–21	80,446	
November 2	8:00 p.m.	No. 18 Pittsburgh	No. 20 SMU	Gerald J. Ford Stadium • University Park, TX	ACCN	SMU 48–25	34,648	
^{#}Rankings from AP Poll. All times are in Eastern Time.

Date	Bye Week				
November 2	Boston College	California	Georgia Tech	Virginia	Wake Forest

==== Week Eleven ====
Date	Time	Visiting team	Home team	Site	TV	Result	Attendance	Ref.
November 8	8:00 p.m.	California	Wake Forest	Allegacy Federal Credit Union Stadium • Winston-Salem, NC	ACCN	CAL 46–36	28,455	
November 9	Noon	No. 4 Miami	Georgia Tech	Bobby Dodd Stadium • Atlanta, GA	ESPN	GT 28–23	47,358	
November 9	Noon	Syracuse	Boston College	Alumni Stadium • Chestnut Hill, MA	CW	BC 37–31	44,500	
November 9	3:30 p.m.	No. 23 Clemson	Virginia Tech	Lane Stadium • Blacksburg, VA	ESPN	CLEM 24–14	65,632	
November 9	3:30 p.m.	Duke	NC State	Carter–Finley Stadium • Raleigh, NC (rivalry)	ACCN	DUKE 29–19	56,919	
November 9	7:30 p.m.	Florida State	No. 10 Notre Dame	Notre Dame Stadium • Notre Dame, IN (rivalry)	NBC	L 3–52	77,622	
November 9	8:00 p.m.	Virginia	No. 18 Pittsburgh	Acrisure Stadium • Pittsburgh, PA	ACCN	UVA 24–19	56,693	
^{#}Rankings from College Football Playoff. All times are in Eastern Time.

Date	Bye Week			
November 9	No. 22 Louisville	North Carolina	No. 13 SMU	Stanford

==== Week Twelve ====
Date	Time	Visiting team	Home team	Site	TV	Result	Attendance	Ref.
November 16	Noon	No. 20 Clemson	Pittsburgh	Acrisure Stadium • Pittsburgh, PA	ESPN	CLEM 24–20	58,667	
November 16	3:00 p.m.	Syracuse	California	California Memorial Stadium • Berkeley, CA	CW	SYR 33–25	33,493	
November 16	3:30 p.m.	Boston College	No. 14 SMU	Gerald J. Ford Stadium • University Park, TX	ESPN	SMU 38–28	34,438	
November 16	3:30 p.m.	No. 19 Louisville	Stanford	Stanford Stadium • Stanford, CA	ACCN	STAN 38–35	18,685	
November 16	3:30 p.m.	Virginia	No. 8 Notre Dame	Notre Dame Stadium • Notre Dame, IN	NBC	L 14–35	77,622	
November 16	8:00 p.m.	Wake Forest	North Carolina	Kenan Memorial Stadium • Chapel Hill, NC (rivalry)	ACCN	UNC 31–24	48,364	
^{#}Rankings from College Football Playoff. All times are in Eastern Time.

Date	Bye Week					
November 16	Duke	Florida State	Georgia Tech	No. 9 Miami	NC State	Virginia Tech

==== Week Thirteen ====
Date	Time	Visiting team	Home team	Site	TV	Result	Attendance	Ref.
November 21	7:30 p.m.	NC State	Georgia Tech	Bobby Dodd Stadium • Atlanta, GA	ESPN	GT 30–29	34,591	
November 23	Noon	Wake Forest	No. 8 Miami	Hard Rock Stadium • Miami, FL	ESPN	MIA 42–14	64,210	
November 23	Noon	No. 13 SMU	Virginia	Scott Stadium • Charlottesville, VA	ESPN2	SMU 33–7	36,305	
November 23	Noon	UConn	Syracuse	JMA Wireless Dome • Syracuse, NY (rivalry)	ACCN	W 31–24	35,453	
November 23	Noon	North Carolina	Boston College	Alumni Stadium • Chestnut Hill, MA	CW	BC 41–21	37,801	
November 23	1:30 p.m.	Charleston Southern	Florida State	Doak Campbell Stadium • Tallahassee, FL	ACCNX/ESPN+	W 41–7	43,711	
November 23	3:30 p.m.	Stanford	California	California Memorial Stadium • Berkeley, CA (Big Game)	ACCN	CAL 24–21	52,428	
November 23	3:30 p.m.	The Citadel	No. 17 Clemson	Memorial Stadium • Clemson, SC	CW	W 51–14	80,300	
November 23	4:00 p.m.	Pittsburgh	Louisville	L&N Federal Credit Union Stadium • Louisville, KY	ESPN2	LOU 37–9	49,441	
November 23	8:00 p.m.	Virginia Tech	Duke	Wallace Wade Stadium • Durham, NC	ACCN	DUKE 31–28	22,462	
^{#}Rankings from College Football Playoff. All times are in Eastern Time.

==== Week Fourteen ====
Date	Time	Visiting team	Home team	Site	TV	Result	Attendance	Ref.
November 29	4:00 p.m.	Stanford	San Jose State	CEFCU Stadium • San Jose, CA (Bill Walsh Legacy Game)	CBS	L 31–34	19,117	
November 29	7:30 p.m.	Georgia Tech	No. 7 Georgia	Sanford Stadium • Athens, GA (Clean, Old-Fashioned Hate)	ABC	L 42–44 ^{8OT}	93,033	
November 30	Noon	No. 15 South Carolina	No. 12 Clemson	Memorial Stadium • Clemson, SC (Palmetto Bowl)	ESPN	L 14–17	81,500	
November 30	Noon	Duke	Wake Forest	Allegacy Federal Credit Union Stadium • Winston-Salem, NC (rivalry)	ACCN	DUKE 23–17	24,776	
November 30	Noon	Louisville	Kentucky	Kroger Field • Lexington, KY (Governor's Cup)	SECN	W 41–14	58,612	
November 30	3:00 p.m.	Pittsburgh	Boston College	Alumni Stadium • Chestnut Hill, MA	CW	BC 34–23	29,704	
November 30	3:30 p.m.	No. 6 Miami	Syracuse	JMA Wireless Dome • Syracuse, NY	ESPN	CUSE 42–38	40,486	
November 30	3:30 p.m.	California	No. 9 SMU	Gerald J. Ford Stadium • University Park, TX	ESPN2	SMU 38–6	33,178	
November 30	3:30 p.m.	NC State	North Carolina	Kenan Memorial Stadium • Chapel Hill, NC (rivalry)	ACCN	NCSU 35–30	50,500	
November 30	7:00 p.m.	Florida	Florida State	Doak Campbell Stadium • Tallahassee, FL (Sunshine Showdown)	ESPN2	L 11–31	55,107	
November 30	8:00 p.m.	Virginia	Virginia Tech	Lane Stadium • Blacksburg, VA (rivalry)	ACCN	VT 37–17	65,632	
^{#}Rankings from College Football Playoff. All times are in Eastern Time.

==== Championship Game ====
Date	Time	Visiting team	Home team	Site	TV	Result	Attendance	Ref.
December 7	8:00 p.m.	No. 17 Clemson	No. 8 SMU	Bank of America Stadium • Charlotte, NC	ABC	CLEM 34–31	53,808	
^{#}Rankings from College Football Playoff. All times are in Eastern Time.

== Head-to-head matchups ==
2024 ACC head-to-head matchups
Team	Boston College	California	Clemson	Duke	Florida State	Georgia Tech	Louisville	Miami	NC State	North Carolina	Pittsburgh	SMU	Stanford	Syracuse	Virginia	Virginia Tech	Wake Forest
vs. Boston College	—	×	×	×	13–28	×	31–27	×	×	21–41	23–34	38–28	×	31–37	24–14	42–21	×
vs. California	×	—	×	×	14–9	×	×	39–38	24–23	×	17–15	38–6	21–24	33–25	×	×	36–46
vs. Clemson	×	×	—	×	13–29	×	33–21	×	35–59	×	20–24	×	14–40	×	31–48	14–24	14–49
vs. Duke	×	×	×	—	16–23	24–14	×	53–31	19–29	20–21	×	28–27	×	×	×	28–31	17–23
vs. Florida State	28–13	9–14	29–13	23–16	—	24–21	×	36–14	×	35–11	×	42–16	×	×	×	×	×
vs. Georgia Tech	×	×	×	14–24	21–24	—	31–19	23–28	29–30	34–41	×	×	×	31–28	×	21–6	×
vs. Louisville	27–31	×	21–33	×	×	19–31	—	52–45	×	×	9–37	34–27	38–35	×	20–24	×	×
vs. Miami	×	38–39	×	31–53	14–36	28–23	45–52	—	×	×	×	×	×	42–38	×	34–38	14–42
vs. NC State	×	23–24	59–35	29–19	×	30–29	×	×	—	30–35	×	×	28–59	24–17	×	×	34–30
vs. North Carolina	41–21	×	×	21–20	11–35	41–34	×	×	35–30	—	34–24	×	×	×	14–41	×	24–31
vs. Pittsburgh	34–23	15–17	24–20	×	×	×	37–9	×	×	24–34	—	48–25	×	13–41	24–19	×	×
vs. SMU	28–38	38–6	×	27–28	16–42	×	27–34	×	×	×	25–48	—	10–40	×	7–33	×	×
vs. Stanford	×	24–21	40–14	×	×	×	35–38	×	59–28	×	×	40–10	—	24–26	×	31–7	27–24
vs. Syracuse	37–31	25–33	×	×	×	28–31	×	38–42	17–24	×	41–13	×	26–24	—	×	31–38	×
vs. Virginia	14–24	×	48–31	×	×	×	24–20	×	×	41–14	19–24	33–7	×	×	—	37–17	30–31
vs. Virginia Tech	21–42	×	24–14	31–28	×	6–21	×	38–34	×	×	×	×	7–31	38–31	17–37	—	×
vs. Wake Forest	×	46–36	49–14	23–17	×	×	×	42–14	30–34	31–24	×	×	24–27	×	31–30	×	—
Total	4–4	2–6	7–1	5–3	1–7	5–3	5–3	6–2	3–5	3–5	3–5	8–0	2–6	5–3	3–5	4–4	2–6
	BC	CAL	CLEM	DUKE	FSU	GT	LOU	MIA	NCSU	UNC	PITT	SMU	STAN	SYR	UVA	VT	WF

× – Matchup not played in 2024
Updated after the season.

== ACC vs other conferences ==
=== ACC vs Power Four matchups ===
The following games include ACC teams competing against "Power Four" conference teams from the Big Ten, Big 12 and SEC, as well as Notre Dame. All rankings are from the AP Poll at the time of the game.

Date	Conference	Visitor	Home	Site	Score
August 29	Big Ten	North Carolina	Minnesota	Huntington Bank Stadium • Minneapolis, MN	W 19–17
August 30	Big 12	TCU	Stanford	Stanford Stadium • Stanford, CA	L 27–34
August 31	SEC	19 Miami	Florida	Ben Hill Griffin Stadium • Gainesville, FL (rivalry)	W 41–17
August 31	SEC	14 Clemson	1 Georgia†	Mercedes-Benz Stadium • Atlanta, GA (rivalry)	L 3–34
August 31	SEC	Virginia Tech	Vanderbilt	FirstBank Stadium • Nashville, TN	L 27–34 ^{OT}
September 6	Big 12	BYU	SMU	Gerald J. Ford Stadium • University Park, TX	L 15–18
September 6	Big Ten	Duke	Northwestern	Martin Stadium • Evanston, IL	W 26–20 ^{2OT}
September 7	SEC	24 NC State	14 Tennessee†	Bank of America Stadium • Charlotte, NC	L 10–51
September 7	Big 12	Pittsburgh	Cincinnati	Nippert Stadium • Cincinnati, OH	W 28–27
September 7	SEC	California	Auburn	Jordan-Hare Stadium • Auburn, AL	W 21–14
September 14	Big Ten	Maryland	Virginia	Scott Stadium • Charlottesville, VA (rivalry)	L 13–27
September 14	SEC	24 Boston College	6 Missouri	Faurot Field • Columbia, MO	L 21–27
September 14	Big 12	West Virginia	Pittsburgh	Acrisure Stadium • Pittsburgh, PA (rivalry)	W 38–34
September 14	SEC	5 Ole Miss	Wake Forest	Allegacy Federal Credit Union Stadium • Winston-Salem, NC	L 6–40
September 21	Big Ten	Rutgers	Virginia Tech	Lane Stadium • Blacksburg, VA	L 23–26
September 21	Big Ten	Michigan State	Boston College	Alumni Stadium • Chestnut Hill, MA	W 23–19
September 21	Big 12	TCU	SMU	Gerald J. Ford Stadium • University Park, TX (rivalry)	W 66–42
September 28	Independent	15 Louisville	16 Notre Dame	Notre Dame Stadium • Notre Dame, IN	L 24–31
October 12	Independent	Stanford	11 Notre Dame	Notre Dame Stadium • Notre Dame, IN (rivalry)	L 7–49
October 19	Independent	12 Notre Dame	Georgia Tech	Mercedes-Benz Stadium • Atlanta, GA (rivalry)	L 13–31
November 9	Independent	Florida State	10 Notre Dame	Notre Dame Stadium • Notre Dame, IN (rivalry)	L 3–52
November 16	Independent	Virginia	8 Notre Dame	Notre Dame Stadium • Notre Dame, IN	L 14–35
November 29	SEC	Georgia Tech	7 Georgia	Sanford Stadium • Athens, GA (rivalry)	L 42–44^{OT}
November 30	SEC	Louisville	Kentucky	Kroger Field • Lexington, KY (rivalry)	W 41–14
November 30	SEC	15 South Carolina	12 Clemson	Memorial Stadium • Clemson, SC (rivalry)	L 14–17
November 30	SEC	Florida	Florida State	Doak Campbell Stadium • Tallahassee, FL (rivalry)	L 11–31

Note:† Denotes Neutral Site Game

=== ACC vs Group of Five matchups ===
The following games include ACC teams competing against teams from the American, C-USA, MAC, Mountain West, and Sun Belt, as well as the Pac-12.

Date	Conference	Visitor	Home	Site	Score
August 24	Mountain West	SMU	Nevada	Mackay Stadium • Reno, NV	W 29–24
August 31	Sun Belt	Georgia State	Georgia Tech	Bobby Dodd Stadium • Atlanta, GA	W 35–12
August 31	MAC	Kent State	Pittsburgh	Acrisure Stadium • Pittsburgh, PA	W 55–24
August 31	MAC	Ohio	Syracuse	JMA Wireless Dome • Syracuse, NY	W 38–22
September 7	Sun Belt	Appalachian State	25 Clemson	Memorial Stadium • Clemson, SC	W 66–20
September 7	Sun Belt	Marshall	Virginia Tech	Lane Stadium • Blacksburg, VA	W 31–14
September 7	C-USA	Jacksonville State	22 Louisville	L&N Federal Credit Union Stadium • Louisville, KY	W 49–14
September 7	American	Charlotte	North Carolina	Kenan Memorial Stadium • Chapel Hill, NC	W 38–20
September 14	MAC	Ball State	10 Miami	Hard Rock Stadium • Miami Gardens, FL	W 62–0
September 14	American	Memphis	Florida State	Doak Campbell Stadium • Tallahassee, FL	L 12–20
September 14	C-USA	Louisiana Tech	NC State	Carter–Finley Stadium • Raleigh, NC	W 30–20
September 14	Sun Belt	Virginia Tech	Old Dominion	S.B. Ballard Stadium • Norfolk, VA	W 37–17
September 14	Mountain West	San Diego State	California	California Memorial Stadium • Berkeley, CA	W 31–10
September 21	American	8 Miami	South Florida	Raymond James Stadium • Tampa, FL	W 50–15
September 21	Sun Belt	Virginia	Coastal Carolina	Brooks Stadium • Conway, SC	W 43–24
September 21	Sun Belt	James Madison	North Carolina	Kenan Memorial Stadium • Chapel Hill, NC	L 50–70
September 21	C-USA	Duke	Middle Tennessee	Johnny "Red" Floyd Stadium • Murfreesboro, TN	W 45–17
September 28	Sun Belt	Louisiana	Wake Forest	Allegacy Federal Credit Union Stadium • Winston-Salem, NC	L 38–41
September 28	C-USA	Western Kentucky	Boston College	Alumni Stadium • Chestnut Hill, MA	W 21–20
September 28	MAC	Northern Illinois	NC State	Carter–Finley Stadium • Raleigh, NC	W 24–17
October 5	Mountain West	Syracuse	25 UNLV	Allegiant Stadium • Paradise, NV	W 44–41 ^{OT}
October 26	Pac-12	Oregon State	California	California Memorial Stadium • Berkeley, CA	W 44–7
November 30	Mountain West	Stanford	San Jose State	CEFCU Stadium • San Jose, CA (rivalry)	L 31–34

=== ACC vs FBS independents matchups ===
The following games include ACC teams competing against FBS independents UConn or UMass (but excluding independent Notre Dame, which appears in the Power Four section above).

Date	Visitor	Home	Site	Score
September 14	UConn	Duke	Wallace Wade Stadium • Durham, NC	W 26–21
October 19	Wake Forest	UConn	Rentschler Field • East Hartford, CT	W 23–20
November 23	UConn	Syracuse	JMA Wireless Dome • Syracuse, NY (rivalry)	W 31–24

=== ACC vs FCS matchups ===
The Football Championship Subdivision comprises 13 conferences and two independent programs.

Date	Visitor	Home	Site	Score
August 29	Western Carolina	24 NC State	Carter–Finley Stadium • Raleigh, NC	W 38–21
August 29	North Carolina A&T	Wake Forest	Allegacy Federal Credit Union Stadium • Winston-Salem, NC	W 44–13
August 30	Elon	Duke	Wallace Wade Stadium • Durham, NC	W 26–3
August 31	Richmond	Virginia	Scott Stadium • Charlottesville, VA	W 34–13
August 31	Austin Peay	Louisville	L&N Federal Credit Union Stadium • Louisville, KY	W 62–0
August 31	Houston Christian	SMU	Gerald J. Ford Stadium • University Park, TX	W 59–7
August 31	UC Davis	California	California Memorial Stadium • Berkeley, CA	W 31–13
September 7	Florida A&M	12 Miami	Hard Rock Stadium • Miami Gardens, FL	W 56–9
September 7	Duquesne	Boston College	Alumni Stadium • Chestnut Hill, MA	W 56–0
September 7	Cal Poly	Stanford	Stanford Stadium • Stanford, CA	W 41–7
September 14	VMI	Georgia Tech	Bobby Dodd Stadium • Atlanta, GA	W 59–7
September 14	NC Central	North Carolina	Kenan Memorial Stadium • Chapel Hill, NC	W 45–10
September 21	Youngstown State	Pittsburgh	Acrisure Stadium • Pittsburgh, PA	W 73–17
September 28	Holy Cross	Syracuse	JMA Wireless Dome • Syracuse, NY	W 42–14
November 23	The Citadel	17 Clemson	Memorial Stadium • Clemson, SC	W 51–14
November 23	Charleston Southern	Florida State	Doak Campbell Stadium • Tallahassee, FL	W 41–7

=== Records against other conferences ===
Regular season

Power 4 Conferences	Record
Big Ten	3–2
Big 12	3–2
Notre Dame	0–5
SEC	3–8
Power 4 Total	9–17
Other FBS Conferences	Record
American	2–1
C–USA	4–0
Independents (Excluding Notre Dame)	3–0
MAC	4–0
Mountain West	3–1
Pac-12	1–0
Sun Belt	5–2
Other FBS Total	22–4
FCS Opponents	Record
Football Championship Subdivision	16–0
Total Non-Conference Record	47–19

Post Season

Power 4 Conferences	Record
Big Ten	1–3
Big 12	0–1
Notre Dame	0–0
SEC	0–3
Power 4 Total	1–7
Other FBS Conferences	Record
American	0–1
C–USA	0–0
Independents (Excluding Notre Dame)	0–1
MAC	0–1
Mountain West	0–1
Pac-12	1–0
Sun Belt	0–0
Other FBS Total	1–4
Total Bowl Record	2–11

== Postseason ==
=== Bowl games ===
Legend
ACC win
ACC loss
Cancellation

Bowl game	Date	Site	Time (EST)	Television	ACC team	Opponent	Score	Attendance
LA Bowl	December 18, 2024	SoFi Stadium • Inglewood, CA	9:00 p.m.	ESPN	California	No. 24 UNLV	L 13–24	24,420
GameAbove Sports Bowl	December 26, 2024	Ford Field • Detroit, MI	2:00 p.m.	ESPN	Pittsburgh	Toledo	L 46–48 ^{6OT}	26,219
Birmingham Bowl	December 27, 2024	Protective Stadium • Birmingham, AL	3:30 p.m.	ESPN	Georgia Tech	Vanderbilt	L 27–35	33,840
Holiday Bowl	December 27, 2024	Snapdragon Stadium • San Diego, CA	8:00 p.m.	FOX	No. 21 Syracuse	Washington State	W 52–35	23,920
Fenway Bowl	December 28, 2024	Fenway Park • Boston, MA	11:00 a.m.	ESPN	North Carolina	UConn	L 14–27	27,900
Pinstripe Bowl	December 28, 2024	Yankee Stadium • The Bronx, NY	12:00 p.m.	ABC	Boston College	Nebraska	L 15–20	30,062
Pop-Tarts Bowl	December 28, 2024	Camping World Stadium • Orlando, FL	3:30 p.m.	ABC	No. 13 Miami (FL)	No. 18 Iowa State	L 41–42	38,650
Military Bowl	December 28, 2024	Navy–Marine Corps Memorial Stadium • Annapolis, MD	5:45 p.m.	ESPN	NC State	East Carolina	L 21–26	23,981
Sun Bowl	December 31, 2024	Sun Bowl • El Paso, TX	2:00 p.m.	CBS	Louisville	Washington	W 35–34	40,826
Gator Bowl	January 2, 2025	EverBank Stadium • Jacksonville, FL	8:00 p.m.	ESPN	Duke	No. 14 Ole Miss	L 20–52	31,290
Duke's Mayo Bowl	January 3, 2025	Bank of America Stadium • Charlotte, NC	7:30 p.m.	ESPN	Virginia Tech	Minnesota	L 10–24	31,027
College Football Playoff bowl games
College Football Playoff	December 21, 2024	Beaver Stadium • University Park, PA	12:00 p.m.	TNT Sports	No. 10 SMU	No. 4 Penn State	L 10–38	106,013
College Football Playoff	December 21, 2024	Darrell K Royal-Texas Memorial Stadium • Austin, TX	4:00 p.m.	TNT Sports	No. 16 Clemson	No. 3 Texas	L 24–38	101,150

For the 2020–2025 bowl cycle, The ACC will have annually ten appearances in the following bowls: Orange Bowl and Peach Bowl (unless they are selected for playoffs filled by a SEC and at-large team if champion is in the playoffs), Military Bowl, Duke's Mayo Bowl, Gator Bowl, Pop-Tarts Bowl, Fenway Bowl, ReliaQuest Bowl, Holiday Bowl and Sun Bowl.

== Awards and honors ==
=== Player of the week honors ===
Week	Quarterback		Receiver		Running Back		Offensive Line		Defensive Line		Linebacker		Defensive Back		Specialist			Rookie		
Week	Player	Team	Player	Team	Player	Team	Player	Team	Player	Team	Player	Team	Player	Team	Player	Team	Position	Player	Team	Position
Week 0	Haynes King	Georgia Tech	RJ Maryland	SMU	Jamal Haynes	Georgia Tech	Weston Franklin	Georgia Tech	None		Kyle Efford	Georgia Tech	Shyheim Brown	Florida State	Ryan Fitzgerald	Florida State	K	None		
Week 1	Cam Ward	Miami	Kevin Concepcion	NC State	Treshaun Ward	Boston College	Zach Carpnter	Miami	Jahvaree Ritzie	North Carolina	Marlowe Wax	Syracuse	Jaden Harris	Miami	Noah Burnette	North Carolina	K	Eli Holstein	Pittsburgh	QB
Week 2	Cade Klubnik	Clemson	Konata Mumpfield	Pittsburgh	Desmond Reid	Pittsburgh	Da'Metrius Weatherspoon	Syracuse	Tyler Baron	Miami	Teddye Buchanan	California	Nohl Williams	California	Ben Sauls	Pittsburgh	K	Eli Holstein (2)	Pittsburgh	QB
Week 2	Kyle McCord	Syracuse	Konata Mumpfield	Pittsburgh	Desmond Reid	Pittsburgh	Da'Metrius Weatherspoon	Syracuse	Tyler Baron	Miami	Teddye Buchanan	California	Nohl Williams	California	Ben Sauls	Pittsburgh	K	Eli Holstein (2)	Pittsburgh	QB
Week 3	Eli Holstein	Pittsburgh	Jaylin Lane	Virginia Tech	Omarion Hampton	North Carolina	Francis Mauigoa	Miami	Antwaun Powell-Ryland	Virginia Tech	Kyle Louis	Pittsburgh	Donovan McMillon	Pittsburgh	Kanoah Vinesett	NC State	K	Eli Holstein (3)	Pittsburgh	QB
Week 4	Cam Ward (2)	Miami	Lewis Bond	Boston College	Brashard Smith	SMU	Noah Josey	Virginia	Patrick Payton	Florida State	David Bailey	Stanford	Ahmaad Moses	SMU	Emmet Kenney	Stanford	K	Eli Holstein (4)	Pittsburgh	QB
Week 5	Cam Ward (3)	Miami	Jackson Meeks	Syracuse	Star Thomas	Duke	None		Donovan Ezeiruaku	Boston College	Kobe Wilson	SMU	DK Kaufman	NC State	John Love	Virginia Tech	K	Micah Ford	Stanford	RB
Week 6	Cam Ward (4)	Miami	Desmond Reid	Pittsburgh	LeQuint Allen	Syracuse	Marcus Tate	Clemson	Fadil Diggs	Syracuse	Kyle Louis (2)	Pittsburgh	Jonas Sanker	Virginia	Nolan Hauser	Clemson	K	Eli Holstein (5)	Pittsburgh	QB
Week 7	Cade Klubnik (2)	Clemson	Jackson Meeks (2)	Syracuse	Jamal Haynes (2)	Georgia Tech	Keylan Rutledge	Georgia Tech	Jimmy Scott	Pittsburgh	Justin Barron	Syracuse	Jonas Sanker (2)	Virginia	Ben Sauls (2)	Pittsburgh	K	Isaac Brown	Louisville	RB
Week 8	Cam Ward (5)	Miami	Samuel Brown Jr.	Miami	Bhayshul Tuten	Virginia Tech	Xavier Chaplin	Virginia Tech	Antwaun Powell-Ryland (2)	Virginia Tech	Ozzie Nicholas	Duke	Chandler Rivers	Duke	Samuel Singleton Jr.	Florida State	K	CJ Bailey	NC State	QB
Week 9	Fernando Mendoza	California	J. J. Jones	North Carolina	Damien Martinez	Miami	Luke Petitbon	Wake Forest	Kaimon Rucker	North Carolina	Rasheem Biles	Pittsburgh	Isaiah Nwokobia	SMU	Derek Morris	California	K	Isaac Brown (2)	Louisville	RB
Week 10	Cam Ward (6)	Miami	Xavier Restrepo	Miami	Omarion Hampton (2)	North Carolina	Monroe Mills	Louisville	Beau Atkinson	North Carolina	Marlowe Wax (2)	Syracuse	Quincy Riley	Louisville	Brock Travelstead	Louisville	K	Isaac Brown (3)	Louisville	RB
Week 11	Fernando Mendoza (2)	California	Oronde Gadsden II	Syracuse	Kye Robichaux	Boston College	Jordan Williams	Georgia Tech	Xavier Carlton	California	Sammy Brown	Clemson	Jonas Sanker (3)	Virginia	Ryan Coe	California	K	Sammy Brown	Clemson	LB
Week 12	Ashton Daniels	Stanford	Emmett Mosley V	Stanford	Omarion Hampton (3)	North Carolina	Savion Washington	Syracuse	T. J. Parker	Clemson	Kobe Wilson (2)	SMU	Jonas Sanker (4)	Virginia	Emmet Kenney (2)	Stanford	K	Emmett Mosley V	Stanford	WR
Week 13	Fernando Mendoza (3)	California	Eli Pancol	Duke	Jay Haynes	Clemson	Ozzy Trapilo	Boston College	Donovan Ezeiruaku (2)	Boston College	Stanquan Clark	Louisville	Mishael Powell	Miami	Aidan Birr	Georgia Tech	K	Aaron Philo	Georgia Tech	QB
Week 14	Haynes King (2)	Georgia Tech	Jackson Meeks (3)	Syracuse	Isaac Brown	Louisville	Savion Washington (2)	Syracuse	Donovan Ezeiruaku (3)	Boston College	Cameron Bergeron	Duke	Devin Grant	Syracuse	John Love (2)	Virginia Tech	K	William "Pop" Watson	Virginia Tech	QB

=== All-conference teams ===
First team

Position	Player	Team
First team offense
QB	Cam Ward	Miami
RB	Omarion Hampton	North Carolina
RB	Brashard Smith	SMU
WR	Xavier Restrepo	Miami
WR	Ja'Corey Brooks	Louisville
WR	Antonio Williams	Clemson
TE	Oronde Gadsden II	Syracuse
All Purpose Back	Desmond Reid	Pittsburgh
T	Blake Miller	Clemson
T	Ozzy Trapilo	Boston College
G	Willie Lampkin	North Carolina
G	Keylan Rutledge	Georgia Tech
C	Drew Kendall	Boston College
First team defense
DE	Donovan Ezeiruaku	Boston College
DE	Antwaun Powell-Ryland	Virginia Tech
DT	Aeneas Peebles	Virginia Tech
DT	Simeon Barrow Jr.	Miami
DT	Jared Harrison-Hunte	SMU
LB	Kyle Louis	Pittsburgh
LB	Barrett Carter	Clemson
LB	Teddye Buchanan	California
CB	Nohl Williams	California
CB	Chandler Rivers	Duke
S	Jonas Sanker	Virginia
S	Isaiah Nwokobia	SMU
First team special teams
PK	Andy Borregales	Miami
P	Alex Mastromanno	Florida State
SP	Desmond Reid	Pittsburgh

Second team

Position	Player	Team
Second team offense
QB	Kyle McCord	Syracuse
RB	Bhayshul Tuten	Virginia Tech
RB	Isaac Brown	Louisville
WR	Trebor Pena	Syracuse
WR	Jackson Meeks	Syracuse
WR	Elic Ayomanor	Stanford
TE	Elijah Arroyo	Miami
All Purpose Back	Omarion Hampton	North Carolina
T	Brian Parker II	Duke
T	Francis Mauigoa	Miami
G	Caleb Krings	Duke
G	Marcus Tate	Clemson
C	Jakai Clark	SMU
Second team defense
DE	T. J. Parker	Clemson
DE	Ashton Gillotte	Louisville
DT	Jordan van den Berg	Georgia Tech
DT	Kendy Charles	Duke
LB	Kobe Wilson	SMU
LB	Francisco Mauigoa	Miami
LB	Branson Combs	Wake Forest
CB	Avieon Terrell	Clemson
CB	Quincy Riley	Louisville
S	Terry Moore	Duke
S	Mishael Powell	Miami
S	Donovan McMillon	Pittsburgh
Second team special teams
PK	Ryan Fitzgerald	Florida State
P	Lachlan Wilson	California
SP	Alex Mastromanno	Florida State

Third team

Position	Player	Team
Third team offense
QB	Kevin Jennings	SMU
RB	Phil Mafah	Clemson
RB	Demond Claiborne	Wake Forest
WR	Malachi Fields	Virginia
WR	Jordan Moore	Duke
WR	Eli Pancol	Duke
TE	Jake Briningstool	Clemson
All Purpose Back	Demond Claiborne	Wake Forest
T	P. J. Williams	SMU
T	Jordan Williams	Georgia Tech
G	Logan Parr	SMU
G	Walker Parks	Clemson
C	Zeke Correll	NC State
Third team defense
DE	Xavier Carlton	California
DE	Davin Vann	NC State
DT	Payton Page	Clemson
DT	Cam Horsley	Boston College
DT	Jahvaree Ritzie	North Carolina
LB	Rasheem Biles	Pittsburgh
LB	Ozzie Nicholas	Duke
LB	Kyle Efford	Georgia Tech
CB	Clarence Lewis	Syracuse
CB	Mansoor Delane	Virginia Tech
S	Nick Andersen	Wake Forest
S	Craig Woodson	California
Third team special teams
PK	Ben Sauls	Pittsburgh
P	Peter Moore	Virginia Tech
SP	Jaylin Lane	Virginia Tech

=== ACC individual awards ===
ACC Player of the Year

Cam Ward, QB, Miami

ACC Rookie of the Year

Isaac Brown, RB, Louisville

ACC Coach of the Year

Rhett Lashlee, SMU

ACC Offensive Player of the Year

Cam Ward, QB, Miami

ACC Offensive Rookie of the Year

Isaac Brown, RB, Louisville

Jacobs Blocking Trophy

Willie Lampkin – North Carolina

ACC Defensive Player of the Year

Donovan Ezeiruaku, DE, Boston College

ACC Defensive Rookie of the Year

Sammy Brown, LB, Clemson

=== All-Americans ===
==== Consensus All-Americans ====
Currently, the NCAA compiles consensus all-America teams in the sports of Division I FBS football and Division I men's basketball using a point system computed from All-America teams named by coaches associations or media sources. Players are chosen against other players playing at their position only. To be selected a consensus All-American, players must be chosen to the first team on at least half of the five official selectors as recognized by the NCAA. Second- and third-team honors are used to break ties. Players named first-team by all five selectors are deemed unanimous All-Americans. Currently, the NCAA recognizes All-Americans selected by the AP, AFCA, FWAA, TSN, and the WCFF to determine consensus and unanimous All-Americans.

2024 Consensus All-Americans
Unanimous	Consensus
None	Donovan Ezeiruaku – Boston College; Alex Mastromanno – Florida State; Cam Ward – Miami; Nohl Williams – California

==== Associated Press ====
2024 AP All-Americans
First Team	Second Team	Third Team
Donovan Ezeiruaku – Boston College; Willie Lampkin – North Carolina; Alex Mastromanno – Florida State; Xavier Restrepo – Miami; Cam Ward – Miami	Omarion Hampton – North Carolina; Kyle Louis – Pittsburgh; Desmond Reid – Pittsburgh; Nohl Williams – California	Barrett Carter – Clemson; Ryan Fitzgerald – Florida State; Oronde Gadsden – Syracuse; Aeneas Peebles – Virginia Tech; Antwaun Powell-Ryland – Virginia Tech; Chandler Rivers – Duke; Brashard Smith – SMU

==== AFCA ====
2024 AFCA All-Americans
First Team	Second Team
Donovan Ezeiruaku – Boston College; Ryan Fitzgerald – Florida State; Omarion Hampton – North Carolina; Alex Mastromanno – Florida State; Xavier Restrepo – Miami; Cam Ward – Miami; Nohl Williams – California	Willie Lampkin – North Carolina; Antwaun Powell-Ryland – Virginia Tech; Brashard Smith – SMU

==== FWAA ====
2024 FWAA All-Americans
First Team	Second Team
Alex Mastromanno – Florida State; Collin Rogers – SMU; Nohl Williams – California	Antwaun Powell-Ryland – Virginia Tech; Desmond Reid – Pittsburgh; Xavier Restrepo – Miami; Cam Ward – Miami

==== The Sporting News ====
2024 Sporting News All-Americans
First Team	Second Team
Donovan Ezeiruaku – Boston College; Willie Lampkin – North Carolina; Kyle Louis – Pittsburgh; Cam Ward – Miami; Nohl Williams – California	Omarion Hampton – North Carolina; Alex Mastromanno – Florida State; Antwaun Powell-Ryland – Virginia Tech; Xavier Restrepo – Miami

==== WCFF ====
2024 Walter Camp All-Americans
First Team	Second Team
Alex Mastromanno – Florida State; Cam Ward – Miami; Nohl Williams – California	Donovan Ezeiruaku – Boston College; Omarion Hampton – North Carolina; Willie Lampkin – North Carolina; Antwaun Powell-Ryland – Virginia Tech

== Home game attendance ==
Team	Stadium	Capacity	Game 1	Game 2	Game 3	Game 4	Game 5	Game 6	Game 7	Total	Average	% of Capacity
Boston College	Alumni Stadium	44,500	38,441	44,500	41,403	42,887	44,500	37,801	29,704	279,236	39,891	89.64%
California	California Memorial Stadium	63,000	32,275	35,197	52,428	35,303	33,090	33,493	52,428	274,214	39,173	62.18%
Clemson	Memorial Stadium	81,500	81,500	81,500	80,295	80,100	80,446	80,300	81,500	565,641	80,806	99.15%
Duke	Wallace Wade Stadium	35,018	18,466	20,174	35,018	30,735	30,241	22,462		157,096	26,183	74.77%
Florida State	Doak Campbell Stadium	79,560	51,719	55,107	55,107	55,107	55,107	43,711	55,107	370,965	52,995	66.61%
Georgia Tech	Bobby Dodd Stadium	55,000	40,113	31,729	37,287	47,358	34,591			191,078	38,216	69.48%
Louisville	L&N Federal Credit Union Stadium	60,800	47,067	48,575	50,727	50,254	59,115	49,441		305,179	50,863	83.66%
Miami	Hard Rock Stadium	65,326	57,886	51,564	59,539	66,200	60,189	64,210		359,588	59,931	91.74%
North Carolina	Kenan Memorial Stadium	50,500	48,431	45,491	50,500	46,033	44,482	48,364	50,500	333,801	47,686	94.43%
NC State	Carter–Finley Stadium	56,919	56,919	56,919	56,919	56,919	56,919	56,919	56,919	398,433	56,919	100%
Pittsburgh	Acrisure Stadium	68,400	44,616	66,087	48,437	49,773	47,266	56,693	58,667	371,539	53,077	77.6%
SMU	Gerald J. Ford Stadium	32,000	27,080	31,172	33,168	34,879	34,648	34,438	33,178	228,563	32,652	102.04%
Stanford	Stanford Stadium	50,424	36,026	22,634	36,277	19,117	23,471	18,685		156,210	26,035	51.63%
Syracuse	JMA Wireless Dome	49,057	37,225	39,550	39,290	43,455	38,454	35,453	40,486	273,913	39,130	79.77%
Virginia	Scott Stadium	61,500	40,811	41,352	38,285	32,688	44,550	36,305		233,991	38,999	63.41%
Virginia Tech	Lane Stadium	65,632	65,632	65,632	65,632	65,632	65,632	65,632		393,792	65,632	100%
Wake Forest	Allegacy Federal Credit Union Stadium	31,500	29,450	30,012	32,849	31,061	31,553	28,455	24,776	208,156	29,737	94.4%
Conference		55,920								5,101,395	45,959	82.19%

== NFL draft ==
The 2025 NFL draft was held at Lambeau Field in Green Bay, Wisconsin. The following list includes all ACC players in the draft.

=== List of selections ===
Player	Position	School	Draft Round	Round Pick	Overall Pick	Team
Cam Ward	QB	Miami	1	1	1	Tennessee Titans
Omarion Hampton	RB	North Carolina	1	22	22	New England Patriots
Tyler Shough	QB	Louisville	2	8	40	New Orleans Saints
Donovan Ezeiruaku	DE	Boston College	2	12	44	Dallas Cowboys
Elijah Arroyo	TE	Miami	2	18	50	Seattle Seahawks
Anthony Belton	OT	NC State	2	22	54	Green Bay Packers
Ozzy Trapilo	OT	Boston College	2	24	56	Chicago Bears
Ashton Gillotte	DE	Louisville	3	2	66	Kansas City Chiefs
Azareye'h Thomas	CB	Florida State	3	9	73	New York Jets
Nohl Williams	CB	California	3	21	85	Kansas City Chiefs
Jonas Sanker	S	Virginia	3	29	93	New Orleans Saints
Bhayshul Tuten	RB	Virginia Tech	4	2	104	Jacksonville Jaguars
Craig Woodson	S	California	4	4	106	New England Patriots
Barrett Carter	LB	Clemson	4	17	119	Cincinnati Bengals
Jaylin Lane	WR	Virginia Tech	4	26	128	Washington Commanders
Teddye Buchanan	LB	California	4	27	129	Baltimore Ravens
Quincy Riley	S	Louisville	4	29	131	New Orleans Saints
Elic Ayomanor	WR	Stanford	4	34	136	Tennessee Titans
Joshua Farmer	DT	Florida State	4	35	137	New England Patriots
Jalen Rivers	OG	Miami	5	15	153	Cincinnati Bengals
Elijah Roberts	EDGE	SMU	5	19	157	Tampa Bay Buccaneers
Francisco Mauigoa	LB	Miami	5	24	162	New York Jets
Oronde Gadsden II	TE	Syracuse	5	27	165	Los Angeles Chargers
Drew Kendall	C	Boston College	5	30	168	Philadelphia Eagles
Jackson Hawes	TE	Georgia Tech	5	35	173	Buffalo Bills
Tyler Baron	EDGE	Miami	5	38	176	New York Jets
Dorian Strong	CB	Virginia Tech	6	1	177	Buffalo Bills
Kyle McCord	QB	Syracuse	6	5	181	Philadelphia Eagles
Andres Borregales	K	Miami	6	6	182	New England Patriots
Marcus Harris	CB	California	6	7	183	Tennessee Titans
Branson Taylor	OT	Pittsburgh	6	23	199	Los Angeles Chargers
Gavin Bartholomew	TE	Pittsburgh	6	26	202	Minnesota Vikings
Antwaun Powell-Ryland	EDGE	Virginia Tech	6	33	209	Philadelphia Eagles
Aeneas Peebles	DT	Virginia Tech	6	34	210	Baltimore Ravens
R. J. Mickens	S	Clemson	6	38	214	Los Angeles Chargers
Damien Martinez	RB	Miami	7	7	223	Seattle Seahawks
Brashard Smith	RB	SMU	7	12	228	Kansas City Chiefs
LeQuint Allen	RB	Syracuse	7	20	236	Jacksonville Jaguars
Phil Mafah	RB	Clemson	7	23	239	Dallas Cowboys
Konata Mumpfield	WR	Pittsburgh	7	26	242	Los Angeles Rams
Zeek Biggers	DT	Georgia Tech	7	37	253	Miami Dolphins
Fadil Diggs	DE	Syracuse	7	38	254	New Orleans Saints

=== Total picks by school ===
Team	Round 1	Round 2	Round 3	Round 4	Round 5	Round 6	Round 7	Total
Boston College	–	2	–	–	1	–	–	3
California	–	–	1	2	–	1	–	4
Clemson	–	–	–	1	–	1	1	3
Duke	–	–	–	–	–	–	–	0
Florida State	–	–	1	1	–	–	–	2
Georgia Tech	–	–	–	–	1	–	1	2
Louisville	–	1	1	1	–	–	–	3
Miami	1	1	–	–	3	1	1	7
North Carolina	1	–	–	–	–	–	–	1
NC State	–	1	–	–	–	–	–	1
Pittsburgh	–	–	–	–	–	2	1	3
SMU	–	–	–	–	1	–	1	2
Stanford	–	–	–	1	–	–	–	1
Syracuse	–	–	–	–	1	1	2	4
Virginia	–	–	1	–	–	–	–	1
Virginia Tech	–	–	–	2	–	3	–	5
Wake Forest	–	–	–	–	–	–	–	0
Total	2	5	4	8	7	9	7	42
