= Drew Kendall =

American football player (born 2001)

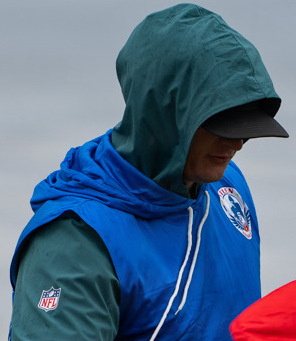
- Kendall in 2026

No. 66 – Philadelphia Eagles
- Position: Center
- Roster status: Active

Personal information
- Born: November 27, 2001 (age 24)
- Listed height: 6 ft 4 in (1.93 m)
- Listed weight: 308 lb (140 kg)

Career information
- High school: Noble and Greenough (Dedham, Massachusetts)
- College: Boston College (2021–2024)
- NFL draft: 2025: 5th round, 168th overall pick

Career history
- Philadelphia Eagles (2025–present)

Awards and highlights
- First-team All-ACC (2024)

Career NFL statistics as of Week 4, 2026
- Games played: 11
- Games started: 4
- Stats at Pro Football Reference

Andrew Kendall (born November 27, 2001) is an American professional football center for the Philadelphia Eagles of the National Football League (NFL). He played college football for the Boston College Eagles and was selected by Philadelphia in the fifth round of the 2025 NFL draft.

== Early life ==
Kendall was born on November 27, 2001, and grew up in Norwell, Massachusetts. The son of Pete Kendall, an NFL player, Kendall was close friends growing up with Ozzy Trapilo, also the son of an NFL player. Kendall played several sports growing up, including football, baseball and basketball, having started football in fourth grade. He was teammates with Trapilo on a Pop Warner football team and later attended Noble and Greenough School, where he competed in football for head coach Panos Voulgaris and lacrosse.

At Noble and Greenough, Kendall was ranked one of the top 100 recruits nationally. He won four varsity letters and played on both offense and defense as a guard, center and defensive end. He was all-league as a junior and was ranked a four-star recruit, the number one recruit in Massachusetts, as well as the ninth-best interior lineman in the nation. He committed to play college football for the Boston College Eagles, where his father had played; Kendall then wore number 66 for the Eagles, the same as his father.

== College career ==
Kendall joined Trapilo at Boston College. He redshirted as a freshman at Boston College in 2021, appearing in two games. He then won a starting role in 2022 at center, starting 11 games while missing one due to injury. He remained a starter in the following two seasons. As a junior in 2024, Kendall served as a team captain and was named first-team All-Atlantic Coast Conference (ACC) after starting all 13 games. He opted to forgo his senior season and entered the 2025 NFL draft, while accepting an invite to the 2025 East–West Shrine Bowl. He finished with 37 starts in his collegiate career and participated at the 2025 NFL Scouting Combine.

== Professional career ==
Pre-draft measurables
Height	Weight	Arm length	Hand span	Wingspan	40-yard dash	10-yard split	20-yard split	20-yard shuttle	Three-cone drill	Vertical jump	Broad jump	Bench press
6 ft 4 1/4 in (1.94 m)	308 lb (140 kg)	31 3/4 in (0.81 m)	9 5/8 in (0.24 m)	6 ft 5 1/2 in (1.97 m)	5.05 s	1.79 s	2.95 s	4.51 s	7.56 s	30.5 in (0.77 m)	8 ft 9 in (2.67 m)	20 reps
All values from NFL Combine/Pro Day

Kendall was selected by the Philadelphia Eagles with the 168th overall pick in the fifth round of the 2025 NFL draft.
