= Kyle Efford =

American football player

No. 44
- Position: Linebacker

Personal information
- Born: September 30, 2003 (age 23)
- Listed height: 6 ft 2 in (1.88 m)
- Listed weight: 225 lb (102 kg)

Career information
- High school: Dacula (Dacula, Georgia)
- College: Georgia Tech (2022–2026)

Awards and highlights
- Third-team All-ACC (2024)
- Stats at ESPN

Kyle Efford is an American former college football linebacker who played for the Georgia Tech Yellow Jackets.

== Early life ==
Efford attended Dacula High School in Dacula, Georgia. He committed to play college football at the Georgia Institute of Technology.

== College career ==
As a freshman in 2022, Efford was redshirted. In week 13 of the 2023 season, he notched 11 tackles and an interception in a win over Syracuse. Efford finished the 2023 season with 81 tackles, a sack, and an interception. In week one of the 2024 season, Efford recorded 13 tackles in a win over Georgia State. In week seven, he notched ten tackles in a victory against North Carolina. Efford finished the 2024 season with 64 tackles with five and a half being for a loss, and three sacks in ten games played. He finished the 2025 season with 77 tackles.

On October 13, 2026, Efford announced his retirement from football due to injuries, stating that he would remain a team captain and serve as a player-coach for the remainder of the 2026 season.
