= Quincy Riley =

American football player (born 2001)

No. 29 – New Orleans Saints
- Position: Cornerback
- Roster status: Active

Personal information
- Born: May 26, 2001 (age 25); Columbia, South Carolina, U.S.
- Listed height: 5 ft 11 in (1.80 m)
- Listed weight: 195 lb (88 kg)

Career information
- High school: A.C. Flora (Forest Acres, South Carolina)
- College: Middle Tennessee (2019–2021); Louisville (2022–2024)
- NFL draft: 2025: 4th round, 131st overall pick

Career history
- New Orleans Saints (2025–present)

Awards and highlights
- ESPN NFL All-Rookie Team (2025); First-team All-C-USA (2021); Second-team All-ACC (2024); Conference USA All-Freshman (2020)

Career NFL statistics as of 2025
- Total tackles: 35
- Forced fumbles: 1
- Interceptions: 1
- Pass deflections: 10
- Stats at Pro Football Reference

Quincy Cory DaShawn Riley (born May 26, 2001) is an American professional football cornerback for the New Orleans Saints of the National Football League (NFL). He played college football for the Middle Tennessee Blue Raiders and Louisville Cardinals. Riley was selected by the Saints in the fourth round of the 2025 NFL draft.

== Early life ==
Riley was born on May 26, 2001, in Columbia, South Carolina. He attended A.C. Flora High School in Columbia where he lettered in football, basketball and track. Coming out of high school, Riley committed to playing college football for the Middle Tennessee State Blue Raiders.

== College career ==
=== Middle Tennessee ===
In the 2019 season, Riley recorded three tackles. In the 2020 regular-season finale, he had his first career interceptions, as he picked off two pass against North Texas. During the 2021 season, Riley totaled 33 tackles with four and a half being for a loss, a sack and a half, nine pass deflections, five interceptions, and a touchdown, earning first-team all-Conference USA honors. After the season, he entered the NCAA transfer portal.

=== Louisville ===
Riley transferred to play for the Louisville Cardinals. In 2022, he tallied 27 tackles with one going for a loss, a sack, two pass deflections, three interceptions, and a touchdown. In the 2023 season, Riley had 49 tackles, 12 pass deflections, and three interceptions. For his performance on the 2023 season, he was named an Atlantic Coast Conference (ACC) honorable mention. Riley elected to return to Louisville for his final season of eligibility in 2024.

== Professional career ==
Pre-draft measurables
Height	Weight	Arm length	Hand span	Wingspan	40-yard dash	10-yard split	20-yard split
5 ft 10 5/8 in (1.79 m)	194 lb (88 kg)	31 in (0.79 m)	8 1/2 in (0.22 m)	6 ft 3 in (1.91 m)	4.48 s	1.54 s	2.64 s
All values from NFL Combine

Riley was selected by the New Orleans Saints at the 2025 NFL draft in the fourth round (131st pick). The Saints used one of the selections they previously acquired from the Washington Commanders in the Marshon Lattimore trade to draft Riley. In Week 7, Riley recorded his first career interception against Chicago Bears quarterback Caleb Williams.

== NFL career statistics ==
=== Regular season ===
Year	Team	Games		Tackles					Interceptions						Fumbles				
Year	Team	GP	GS	Cmb	Solo	Ast	Sck	TFL	Int	Yds	Avg	Lng	TD	PD	FF	Fmb	FR	Yds	TD
2025	NO	17	5	35	29	6	0.0	0	1	0	0.0	0	0	10	1	0	0	0	0
Career		17	5	35	29	6	0.0	0	1	0	0.0	0	0	10	1	0	0	0	0
