= Dacula High School =

Public high school in Dacula, Georgia, United States

- Dacula High School mascot

Location
- 123 Broad Street; Dacula, Georgia 30019; United States; 33°59′27″N 83°54′02″W

Information
- Type: Public
- Established: 1905
- School district: Gwinnett County Public Schools
- Principal: Jeannie Hidalgo
- Teaching staff: 141.80 (on an FTE basis)
- Grades: 9–12
- Enrollment: 2,534 (2023–2024)
- Student to teacher ratio: 17.87
- Campus: Suburban
- Colors: Navy blue, vegas gold, and white
- Athletics: Baseball, basketball, cheerleading, cross country, football, golf, lacrosse, soccer, softball, swim & dive, tennis, track & field, volleyball, and wrestling
- Mascot: Falcon
- Rival: Mill Creek High School
- Yearbook: The Talon
- Website: daculahs.gcpsk12.org

Dacula High School is a high school in Dacula, Georgia, United States, serving students in grades 9–12. It is operated by Gwinnett County Public Schools. It is a part of the Dacula cluster and is fed from Dacula Middle School.

The school's colors are old gold, white, and navy blue, and its mascot is the Falcon.

In addition to Dacula, the school's attendance boundary includes the Gwinnett County portion of Auburn.

== Notable alumni ==
- Alex Armah, NFL player
- Kyle Efford, college football player
- David Irons, former NFL player
- Kenny Irons, former NFL player
- Corey Levin, NFL player
- Konata Mumpfield, NFL player
