= Willie Lampkin =

American football player (born 2002)

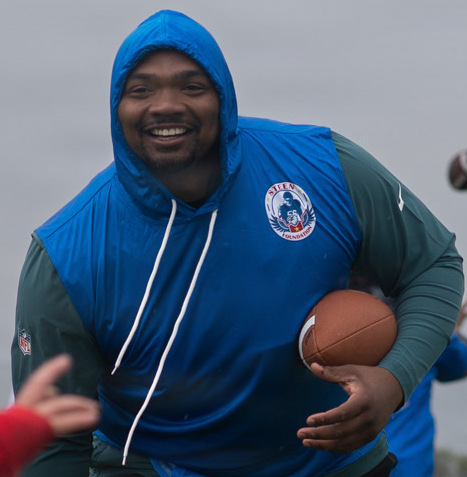
- Lampkin in 2026

No. 61 – Philadelphia Eagles
- Position: Center/Guard
- Roster status: Active

Personal information
- Born: January 22, 2002 (age 24); Bealsville, Florida, U.S.
- Listed height: 5 ft 11 in (1.80 m)
- Listed weight: 290 lb (132 kg)

Career information
- High school: Mulberry (Mulberry, Florida); Lakeland (Lakeland, Florida)
- College: Coastal Carolina (2020–2022); North Carolina (2023–2024)
- NFL draft: 2025: undrafted

Career history
- Los Angeles Rams (2025)*; Philadelphia Eagles (2025–present)
- * Offseason or practice squad member only

Awards and highlights
- First-team All-American (2024); Jacobs Blocking Trophy (2024); First-team All-ACC (2024); First-team All-Sun Belt (2022); 2× Second-team All-Sun Belt (2020, 2021); Third-team All-ACC (2023)
- Stats at Pro Football Reference

William Lampkin IV (born January 22, 2002) is an American professional football center for the Philadelphia Eagles of the National Football League (NFL). He played college football for the Coastal Carolina Chanticleers and North Carolina Tar Heels.

== Early life ==
Willie Lampkin was born on January 22, 2002, to Kyera Joyce and Willie Lampkin Sr. He is from Bealsville, Florida, and attended Mulberry High School for his first two years of high school. While at Mulberry, Lampkin competed in wrestling. After his sophomore year, his mother lost her job, causing him to move in with his father in Lakeland, Florida for financial reasons. As a result, Lampkin attended Lakeland High School for his final two years of high school, where he continued wrestling along with playing football. While at Lakeland, he helped lead the football team to a state championship in 2018 and won the state championship in wrestling his senior year with an undefeated record on the year. Lampkin committed to Coastal Carolina University to continue playing football.

== College career ==
=== Coastal Carolina ===
As a freshman, Lampkin started all twelve games at left guard for Coastal Carolina. After the season, Lampkin was named a second-team All-Sun Belt player and was on multiple outlets' freshman All-American team. During his sophomore year, Lampkin switched to left tackle, starting all thirteen games and once again being named to the second-team All-Sun Belt team. Before the start of his junior year, Lampkin was announced as a member of the Rimington Trophy preseason watchlist. During the year, Lampkin again started all thirteen games and was named a first-team All-Sun Belt team member.

=== North Carolina ===
After the 2022 season, Lampkin transferred to the University of North Carolina at Chapel Hill, where he would continue playing football. In his first year at North Carolina, Lampkin started all eleven games and was named a member of the third-team All-ACC team. After being granted an extra year of eligibility, Lampkin returned to North Carolina to play a fifth year of college football. Before the season, Lampkin was named to the first-team All-ACC team. At the midway point in the season, Lampkin was named to multiple outlets' All-American teams. Following the regular season, Lampkin was named to the first-team All-ACC team and was awarded the Jacobs Blocking Trophy, given to the most outstanding blocker in the ACC. Additionally, Lampkin was named a first-team All-American by multiple outlets.

== Professional career ==
Pre-draft measurables
Height	Weight	Arm length	Hand span	Wingspan	40-yard dash	10-yard split	20-yard split	20-yard shuttle	Vertical jump	Broad jump	Bench press
5 ft 10 3/4 in (1.80 m)	279 lb (127 kg)	31 1/2 in (0.80 m)	10 1/8 in (0.26 m)	6 ft 6 1/2 in (1.99 m)	5.22 s	1.76 s	3.00 s	4.70 s	23.5 in (0.60 m)	8 ft 8 in (2.64 m)	18 reps
All values from Pro Day

=== Los Angeles Rams ===
Lampkin signed with the Los Angeles Rams as an undrafted free agent on April 28, 2025. On August 26, he was waived with an injury designation as part of final roster cuts.

=== Philadelphia Eagles ===
Lampkin was claimed off waivers by the Philadelphia Eagles on August 27, 2025, and placed on injured reserve two days later.
