= Barrett Carter =

American football player (born 2002)

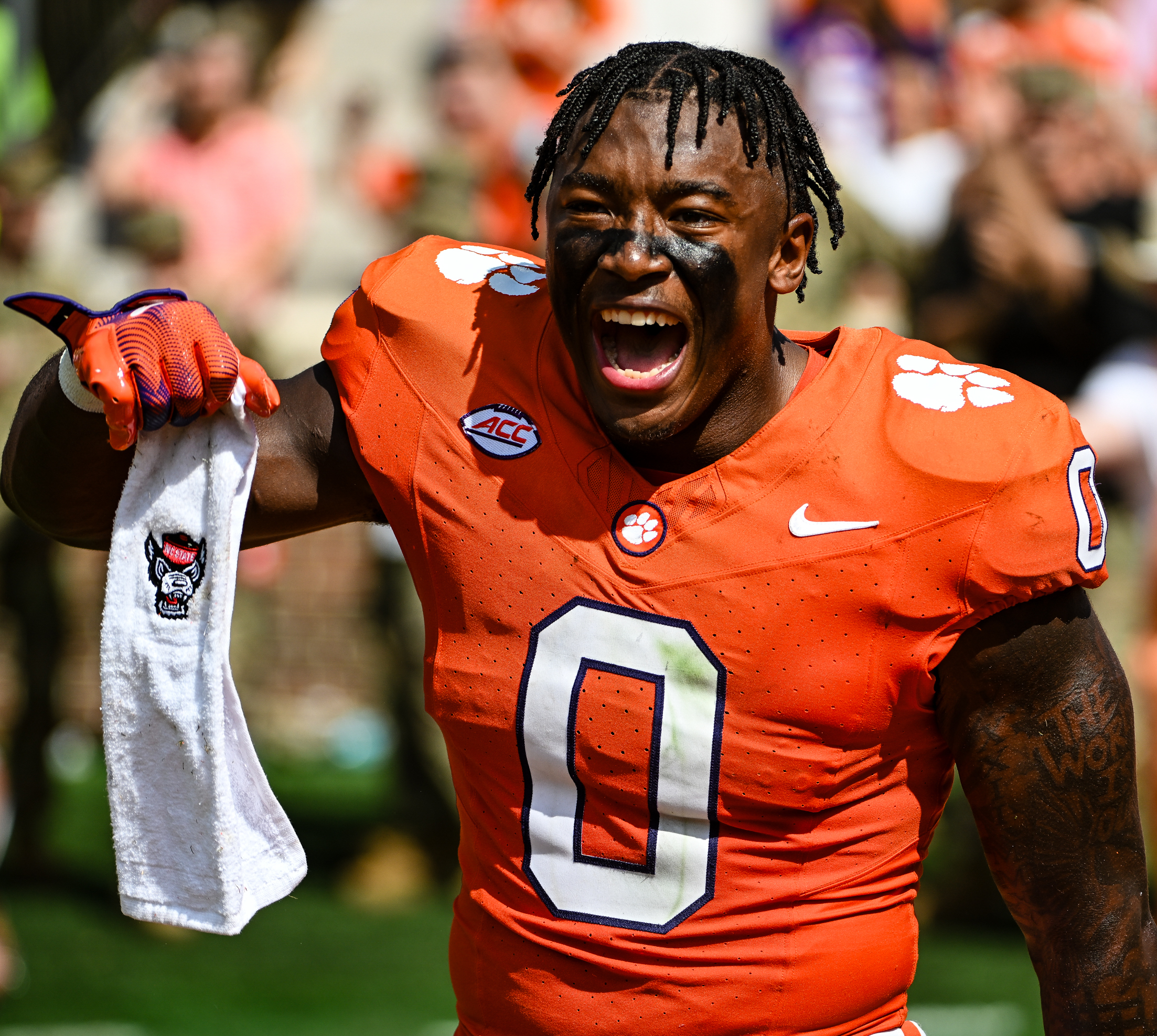
- Carter with the Clemson Tigers in 2024

No. 49 – Cincinnati Bengals
- Position: Linebacker
- Roster status: Active

Personal information
- Born: October 23, 2002 (age 24)
- Listed height: 6 ft 0 in (1.83 m)
- Listed weight: 231 lb (105 kg)

Career information
- High school: North Gwinnett (Suwanee, Georgia)
- College: Clemson (2021–2024)
- NFL draft: 2025: 4th round, 119th overall pick

Career history
- Cincinnati Bengals (2025–present)

Awards and highlights
- First-team All-ACC (2024); Second-team All-ACC (2023)

Career NFL statistics as of Week 10, 2026
- Tackles: 180
- Sacks: 1.5
- Forced fumbles: 2
- Pass deflections: 9
- Interceptions: 2
- Stats at Pro Football Reference

Barrett Carter (born October 23, 2002) is an American professional football linebacker for the Cincinnati Bengals of the National Football League (NFL). He played college football for the Clemson Tigers and was selected by the Bengals in the fourth round of the 2025 NFL draft.

== Early life ==
Carter was born on October 23, 2002. He attended North Gwinnett High School; he recorded 73 tackles and 10 sacks in 2019. Carter was rated a four-star recruit and committed to play college football at Clemson over offers from Georgia, Auburn, and Ohio State.

== College career ==
Carter played in 12 games as a freshman in 2021. He entered his sophomore season as a starter.

== Professional career ==
Pre-draft measurables
| Height | Weight | Arm length | Hand span | Wingspan | 40-yard dash | 10-yard split | 20-yard split | 20-yard shuttle | Vertical jump | Broad jump | Bench press |
|---|---|---|---|---|---|---|---|---|---|---|---|
| 6 ft 0 1/8 in (1.83 m) | 231 lb (105 kg) | 32 1/8 in (0.82 m) | 9 1/4 in (0.23 m) | 6 ft 6 5/8 in (2.00 m) | 4.64 s | 1.59 s | 2.69 s | 4.41 s | 34.5 in (0.88 m) | 9 ft 8 in (2.95 m) | 22 reps |
All values from NFL Combine/Pro Day

Carter was selected by the Cincinnati Bengals in the fourth round (119th overall) of the 2025 NFL draft.

Carter became the starting LB, wearing the green dot, in week 6 of the 2025 season.

== Career statistics ==
=== NFL ===
| Year | Team | Games | | Tackles | | | | | Interceptions | | | | | | Fumbles | | | | |
| Year | Team | GP | GS | Cmb | Solo | Ast | Sck | TFL | Int | Yds | Avg | Lng | TD | PD | FF | Fmb | FR | Yds | TD |
|---|---|---|---|---|---|---|---|---|---|---|---|---|---|---|---|---|---|---|---|
| 2025 | CIN | 17 | 12 | 106 | 53 | 53 | 0.0 | 1 | 1 | 16 | 16.0 | 16 | 0 | 4 | 0 | 0 | 0 | 0 | 0 |
| 2026 | CIN | 9 | 9 | 74 | 30 | 44 | 1.5 | 5 | 1 | 6 | 6.0 | 6 | 0 | 5 | 2 | 0 | 0 | 0 | 0 |
| Career | | 26 | 21 | 180 | 83 | 97 | 1.5 | 6 | 2 | 22 | 11.0 | 16 | 0 | 9 | 2 | 0 | 0 | 0 | 0 |

=== College ===
College statistics
| Year | Team | GP | Tackles | | | | | Interceptions | | | | | Fumbles | |
| Year | Team | GP | Solo | Ast | Tot | Loss | Sk | Int | Yds | Avg | TD | PD | FF | FR |
|---|---|---|---|---|---|---|---|---|---|---|---|---|---|---|
| 2021 | Clemson | 8 | 7 | 9 | 16 | 2.0 | 0.0 | 0 | 0 | | 0 | 1 | 0 | 1 |
| 2022 | Clemson | 13 | 41 | 32 | 73 | 10.5 | 5.5 | 2 | 1 | 0.5 | 0 | 8 | 2 | 0 |
| 2023 | Clemson | 12 | 37 | 25 | 62 | 9.5 | 3.5 | 1 | 0 | 0.0 | 0 | 5 | 0 | 1 |
| 2024 | Clemson | 14 | 42 | 40 | 82 | 11 | 3.5 | 0 | 0 | | 0 | 7 | 0 | 1 |
| Career | | 52 | 126 | 107 | 233 | 33.0 | 12.5 | 3 | 1 | 0.3 | 0 | 21 | 2 | 3 |
