= Donovan McMillon =

American football player (born 2002)

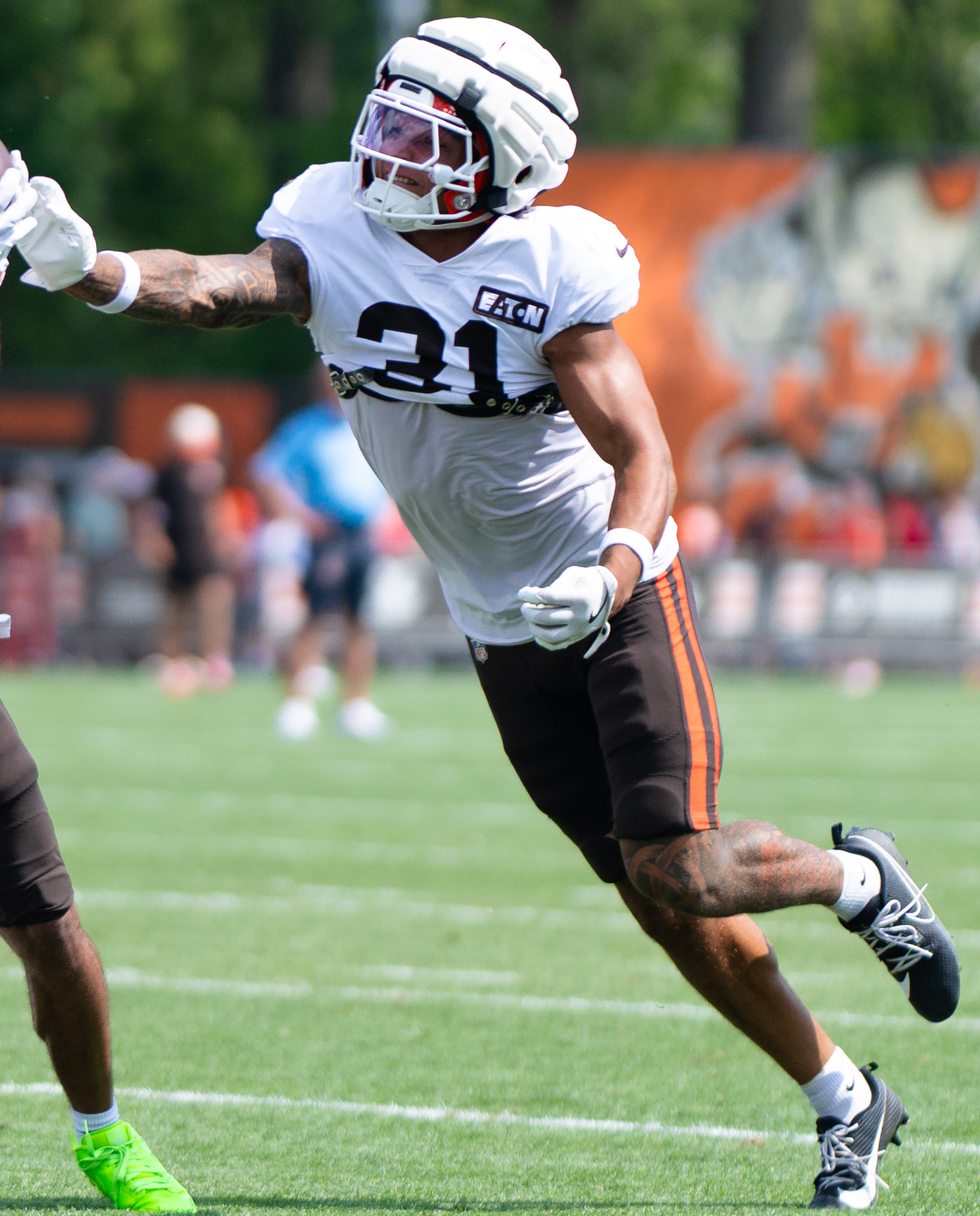
- McMillon with the Cleveland Browns in 2026

No. 31 – Cleveland Browns
- Position: Safety
- Roster status: Active

Personal information
- Born: June 18, 2002 (age 24); Pittsburgh, Pennsylvania, U.S.
- Listed height: 6 ft 2 in (1.88 m)
- Listed weight: 203 lb (92 kg)

Career information
- High school: Peters Township (McMurray, Pennsylvania)
- College: Florida (2021–2022); Pittsburgh (2023–2024)
- NFL draft: 2025: undrafted

Career history
- Cleveland Browns (2025–present)

Awards and highlights
- Second-team All-ACC (2024)

Career NFL statistics as of Week 6, 2026
- Games played: 24
- Total tackles: 22
- Sacks: 1
- Stats at Pro Football Reference

Donovan McMillon (born June 18, 2002) is an American professional football safety for the Cleveland Browns of the National Football League (NFL). He played college football for the Florida Gators and Pittsburgh Panthers. He made the Browns' initial 53-man roster for the 2025 season.

== Professional career ==
Pre-draft measurables
Height	Weight	Arm length	Hand span	Wingspan	40-yard dash	10-yard split	20-yard split	20-yard shuttle	Three-cone drill	Vertical jump	Broad jump	Bench press
6 ft 1 5/8 in (1.87 m)	203 lb (92 kg)	31 1/4 in (0.79 m)	9 in (0.23 m)	6 ft 3 in (1.91 m)	4.46 s	1.64 s	2.62 s	4.13 s	6.98 s	35.0 in (0.89 m)	10 ft 5 in (3.18 m)	21 reps
All values from Pro Day
