= Nohl Williams =

American football player (born 2002)

No. 20 – Kansas City Chiefs
- Position: Cornerback
- Roster status: Active

Personal information
- Born: September 23, 2002 (age 24); Ventura, California, U.S.
- Listed height: 6 ft 1 in (1.85 m)
- Listed weight: 200 lb (91 kg)

Career information
- High school: Pacifica (Oxnard, California)
- College: UNLV (2020–2022); California (2023–2024)
- NFL draft: 2025: 3rd round, 85th overall pick

Career history
- Kansas City Chiefs (2025–present)

Awards and highlights
- Consensus All-American (2024); First-team All-ACC (2024)

Career NFL statistics as of Week 7, 2026
- Total tackles: 77
- Sacks: 2
- Pass deflections: 14
- Interceptions: 2
- Stats at Pro Football Reference

Nohl Laurence Williams (born September 23, 2002) is an American professional football cornerback for the Kansas City Chiefs of the National Football League (NFL). He played college football for the UNLV Rebels and California Golden Bears and was selected by the Chiefs in the third round of the 2025 NFL draft.

Nohl led all of NCAA Division I Football in interceptions in his last year of college, with 7.

== Early life ==
Williams attended Pacifica High School in Oxnard, California. He was rated as a three-star recruit and committed to play college football for the UNLV Rebels.

== College career ==
=== UNLV ===
In his first two seasons with the Rebels in 2020 and 2021, Williams totaled 58 tackles, five pass deflections, two interceptions, and a fumble recovery. In 2022, he earned second-team all-Mountain West Conference honors after totaling 40 tackles, five pass deflections, three interceptions, a forced fumble, and a fumble recovery. After the season, Williams entered his name into the NCAA transfer portal.

=== California ===
On March 15, 2023, Williams transferred to play for the California Golden Bears. In his first season with the team in 2023, he totaled 53 tackles with two being for a loss, six pass deflections, two interceptions, a forced fumble, two fumble recoveries, and two touchdowns. In the 2024 season opener, Williams notched an interception and an 80-yard kickoff return touchdown in a win over UC Davis. In week 2, Williams was named the Atlantic Coast Conference (ACC) defensive back of the week after making two interceptions in the win over Auburn.

== Professional career ==
Pre-draft measurables
Height	Weight	Arm length	Hand span	Wingspan	40-yard dash	10-yard split	20-yard split	20-yard shuttle	Three-cone drill	Vertical jump	Broad jump	Bench press
6 ft 0 3/8 in (1.84 m)	199 lb (90 kg)	30 3/4 in (0.78 m)	9 in (0.23 m)	6 ft 3 1/2 in (1.92 m)	4.50 s	1.54 s	2.66 s	4.25 s	6.97 s	33.5 in (0.85 m)	10 ft 0 in (3.05 m)	19 reps
All values from NFL Combine/Pro Day

Williams was selected in the third round, with the 85th overall pick, of the 2025 NFL draft by the Kansas City Chiefs.

== NFL career statistics ==
=== Regular season ===
Year	Team	Games		Tackles					Interceptions						Fumbles				
Year	Team	GP	GS	Cmb	Solo	Ast	Sck	TFL	Int	Yds	Avg	Lng	TD	PD	FF	Fum	FR	Yds	TD
2025	KC	17	5	48	30	18	1.0	4	0	0	0.0	0	0	7	0	0	0	0	0
Career		17	5	48	30	18	1.0	4	0	0	0.0	0	0	7	0	0	0	0	0
