= Ashton Gillotte =

American football player (born 2002)

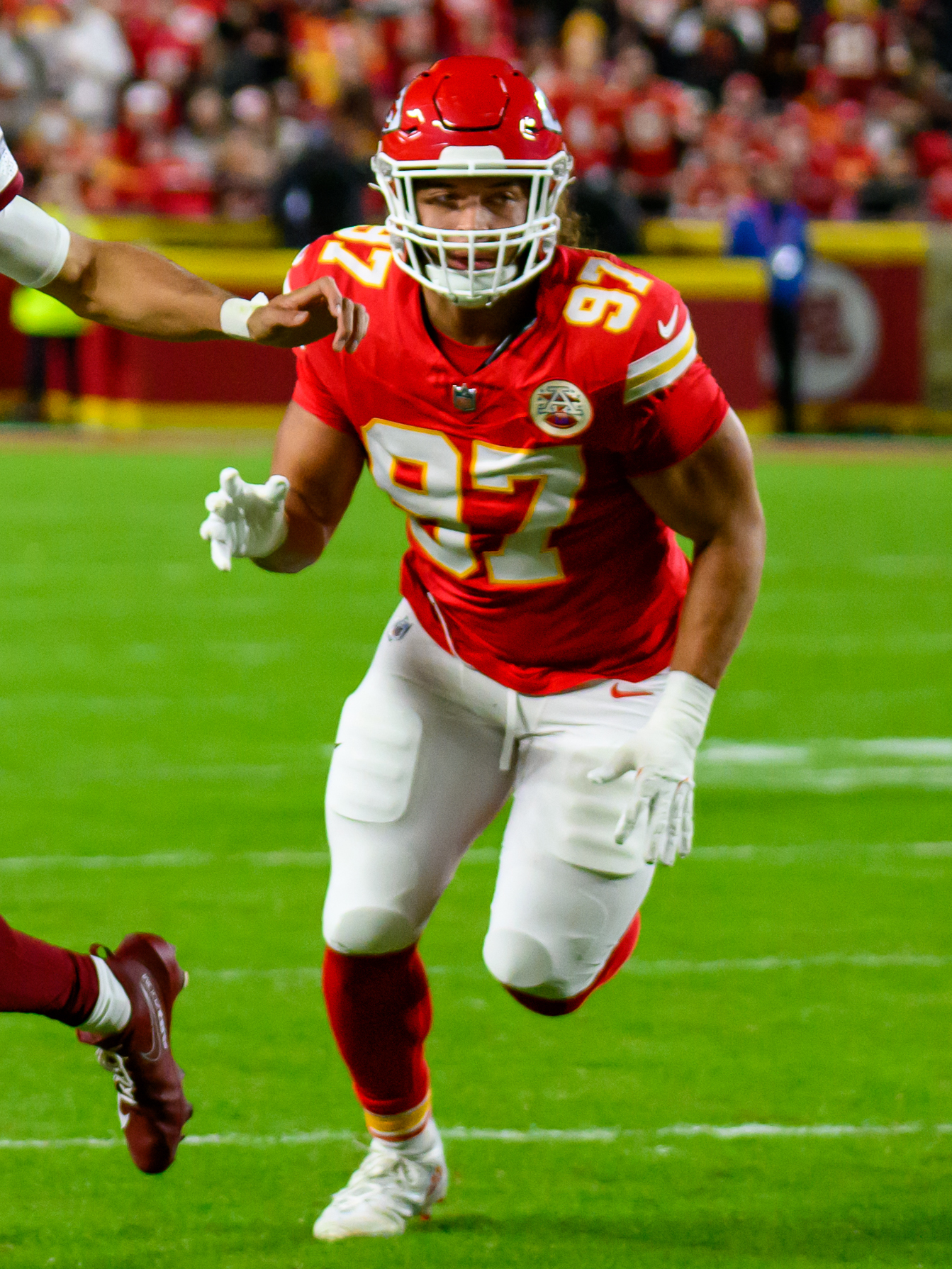
- Gillotte with the Kansas City Chiefs in 2025

No. 97 – Kansas City Chiefs
- Position: Defensive end
- Roster status: Active

Personal information
- Born: October 30, 2002 (age 24); Middletown, Ohio, U.S.
- Listed height: 6 ft 3 in (1.91 m)
- Listed weight: 270 lb (122 kg)

Career information
- High school: Boca Raton (Boca Raton, Florida)
- College: Louisville (2021–2024)
- NFL draft: 2025: 3rd round, 66th overall pick

Career history
- Kansas City Chiefs (2025–present)

Awards and highlights
- First-team All-ACC (2023); Second-team All-ACC (2024)

Career NFL statistics as of 2025
- Total tackles: 38
- Sacks: 1.5
- Pass deflections: 1
- Interceptions: 1
- Stats at Pro Football Reference

Ashton Gillotte (jill-OHT-ee; born October 30, 2002) is an American professional football defensive end for the Kansas City Chiefs of the National Football League (NFL). He played college football for the Louisville Cardinals and was selected by the Chiefs in the third round of the 2025 NFL draft.

== Early life ==
Gillotte was born in Middletown, Ohio and moved to Florida when he was three years old after his parents were divorced. He and his mother settled in Boca Raton, Florida when he was in the sixth grade. Gillotte attended Boca Raton Community High School. As a senior in 2020, he was the Sun Sentinel's Palm Beach County 8A-6A defensive player of the year after recording 55 tackles and 10 sacks in seven games. He committed to the University of Louisville to play college football.

== College career ==
As a true freshman at Louisville in 2021, Gillotte played in 12 games and had 19 tackles and four sacks. As a sophomore in 2022, he started 12 games, recording 24 tackles and seven sacks. He returned to Louisville as a starter his junior year in 2023.

== Professional career ==
Pre-draft measurables
Height	Weight	Arm length	Hand span	Wingspan	40-yard dash	10-yard split	20-yard split	20-yard shuttle	Three-cone drill	Vertical jump	Broad jump	Bench press
6 ft 2 5/8 in (1.90 m)	264 lb (120 kg)	31 7/8 in (0.81 m)	8 1/2 in (0.22 m)	6 ft 6 5/8 in (2.00 m)	4.65 s	1.59 s	2.54 s	4.35 s	6.94 s	36.5 in (0.93 m)	10 ft 0 in (3.05 m)	24 reps
All values from NFL Combine/Pro Day

Gillotte was selected by the Kansas City Chiefs with the 66th pick in the third round of the 2025 NFL draft. The Chiefs had acquired the 66th selection of the draft after trading away L'Jarius Sneed to the Tennessee Titans in the previous offseason.

== NFL career statistics ==
=== Regular season ===
Year	Team	Games		Tackles					Interceptions						Fumbles				
Year	Team	GP	GS	Cmb	Solo	Ast	Sck	TFL	Int	Yds	Avg	Lng	TD	PD	FF	Fmb	FR	Yds	TD
2025	KC	17	2	38	14	24	1.5	3	1	14	14.0	14	0	1	0	0	0	0	0
Career		17	2	38	14	24	1.5	3	1	14	14.0	14	0	1	0	0	0	0	0

== Personal life ==
In May 2026, Gillotte married Indy Ignite player Cara Cresse after getting engaged in February.

His brother, Devin, played college football at Stetson.
