= Jonas Sanker =

American football player (born 2002)

No. 7 – New Orleans Saints
- Position: Safety
- Roster status: Active

Personal information
- Born: November 23, 2002 (age 23); Charlottesville, Virginia, U.S.
- Listed height: 6 ft 1 in (1.85 m)
- Listed weight: 211 lb (96 kg)

Career information
- High school: The Covenant School (Charlottesville)
- College: Virginia (2021–2024)
- NFL draft: 2025: 3rd round, 93rd overall pick

Career history
- New Orleans Saints (2025–present)

Awards and highlights
- ESPN NFL All-Rookie Team (2025); 2× First-team All-ACC (2023, 2024)

Career NFL statistics as of Week 5, 2026
- Total tackles: 113
- Fumble recoveries: 2
- Pass deflections: 6
- Interceptions: 2
- Defensive touchdowns: 1
- Stats at Pro Football Reference

Jonas Sanker (YO-nas; born November 23, 2002) is an American professional football safety for the New Orleans Saints of the National Football League (NFL). He played college football for the Virginia Cavaliers and was selected by the Saints in the third round of the 2025 NFL draft.

== Early life ==
Sanker was born on November 23, 2002 in Charlottesville, Virginia. He attended The Covenant School in Virginia. Coming out of high school, he was rated as a three-star recruit and committed to play college football for the Boston College Eagles. However, Sanker later flipped his commitment to play for the Virginia Cavaliers.

== College career ==
As a freshman in 2021, Sanker notched five tackles. In week 4 of the 2022 season, he recorded his first career interception versus Syracuse. Sanker finished the 2022 season totaling 63 tackles with half a tackle being for a loss, two pass deflections, an interception, a fumble recovery, and a forced fumble. In 2023, he led the Cavaliers in tackles with 107 while also making four for a loss, 11 pass deflections, two fumble recoveries, and three forced fumbles. For his performance in the 2023 season, Sanker was named first-team all-Atlantic Coast Conference (ACC).

== Professional career ==
Pre-draft measurables
Height	Weight	Arm length	Hand span	Wingspan	40-yard dash	10-yard split	20-yard split	20-yard shuttle	Three-cone drill	Vertical jump	Broad jump	Bench press
6 ft 0 3/8 in (1.84 m)	206 lb (93 kg)	32 1/4 in (0.82 m)	9 3/4 in (0.25 m)	6 ft 5 5/8 in (1.97 m)	4.48 s	1.51 s	2.63 s	4.48 s	7.06 s	36.5 in (0.93 m)	10 ft 8 in (3.25 m)	12 reps
All values from NFL Combine/Pro Day

Sanker was selected by the New Orleans Saints with the 93rd pick in the third round of the 2025 NFL draft. The Saints acquired the 93rd pick as part of the trade that sent Marshon Lattimore to the Washington Commanders.

== NFL career statistics ==
Legend
**Bold**	Career high

=== Regular season ===
Year	Team	Games		Tackles					Fumbles				Interceptions				
Year	Team	GP	GS	Cmb	Solo	Ast	Sck	TFL	FF	FR	Yds	TD	Int	Yds	Lng	TD	PD
2025	NO	17	16	80	46	34	0.0	3	0	1	27	0	2	29	29	0	6
Career		17	16	80	46	34	0.0	3	0	1	27	0	2	29	29	0	6
