= Knightdale High School =

Public school in North Carolina, United States

Knightdale High School of Collaborative Design

Location
- 100 Bryan Chalk Lane; Knightdale, North Carolina 27545; United States; 35.811544°N 78.476415°W

Information
- School type: Public
- Motto: Every Student Future Ready
- Founded: 2004 (22 years ago)
- School board: Wake County Public School System
- School district: Wake County Public School System
- Superintendent: Dr. Robert Taylor
- CEEB code: 342124
- Principal: Derek Baker
- Staff: 102.74 (on an FTE basis)
- Grades: 9–12
- Enrollment: 1,725 (2023–2024)
- Student to teacher ratio: 16.79
- Schedule: Block, 4-period
- Hours in school day: Monday–Friday; 7:25 AM–2:18 PM
- Colours: Black and gold
- Mascot: Knights
- Rivals: East Wake High School
- Website: Knightdale High School

Knightdale High School of Collaborative Design (KHSCD) is a public high school part of the Wake County Public School System located in Knightdale, North Carolina.

== History ==
The first Knightdale High School operated from 1926 to 1955, until the opening of nearby East Wake High School. From that time onward, the people of Knightdale had hoped to reopen a local high school in Knightdale. The current Knightdale High School opened on August 10, 2004, as one of 17 public high schools in Wake County, North Carolina.

During the 2015–2016 school year, Knightdale High School was renamed to Knightdale High School of Collaborative Design, to promote positive growth in the school.

In June 2019, Keith Richardson became the school principal.

== Notable alumni ==
- Ronnie Ash, track and field hurdler at the 2016 Summer Olympics representing the United States
- Burkheart Ellis, track and field sprinter at the 2016 Summer Olympics representing Barbados
- Nate Harvey, NFL linebacker
- Stan Okoye, professional basketball player and Olympian at 2016 Summer Olympics representing Nigeria
- Aeneas Peebles, NFL defensive end, played college football for the Virginia Tech Hokies
