= Aeneas Peebles =

American football player (born 2001)

No. 90 – Baltimore Ravens
- Position: Defensive end
- Roster status: Active

Personal information
- Born: September 3, 2001 (age 25); Raleigh, North Carolina, U.S.
- Listed height: 6 ft 0 in (1.83 m)
- Listed weight: 300 lb (136 kg)

Career information
- High school: Knightdale (Knightdale, North Carolina)
- College: Duke (2020–2023); Virginia Tech (2024)
- NFL draft: 2025: 6th round, 210th overall pick

Career history
- Baltimore Ravens (2025–present)

Awards and highlights
- First-team All-ACC (2024); Third-team All-ACC (2023)

Career NFL statistics as of 2025
- Tackles: 3
- Pass deflections: 1
- Stats at Pro Football Reference

Aeneas Peebles (born September 3, 2001) is an American professional football defensive end for the Baltimore Ravens of the National Football League (NFL). He played college football for the Duke Blue Devils and Virginia Tech Hokies. Peebles was selected by the Ravens in the sixth round of the 2025 NFL draft.

== Early life ==
Peebles attended Knightdale High School in Knightdale, North Carolina. Over his junior and senior year in high school, he had a combined 195 tackles and 27 sacks. As a senior in 2019, he was the Northern Athletic 4A Defensive Player of the Year. Peebles committed to Duke University to play college football.

== College career ==
Peebles played at Duke from 2020 to 2023. During the four years he played in 47 games and had 87 tackles and 8.5 sacks. After the 2023 season, he entered the transfer portal and transferred to Virginia Tech to play his final college season.

== Professional career ==
Pre-draft measurables
Height	Weight	Arm length	Hand span	Wingspan	40-yard dash	10-yard split	20-yard split	20-yard shuttle	Vertical jump	Broad jump	Bench press
6 ft 0 1/2 in (1.84 m)	282 lb (128 kg)	31 3/8 in (0.80 m)	9 5/8 in (0.24 m)	6 ft 6 in (1.98 m)	4.94 s	1.74 s	2.89 s	4.70 s	32.5 in (0.83 m)	9 ft 1 in (2.77 m)	28 reps
All values from NFL Combine/Pro Day

Peebles was selected by the Baltimore Ravens with the 210th overall pick in the sixth round of the 2025 NFL draft.

== Personal life ==
Peebles' maternal grandfather, Doug Wilkerson, played in the NFL for 15 seasons as a guard, primarily for the San Diego Chargers and made three All-Pro teams.
