= Joshua Farmer =

American football player (born 2003)

No. 92 – New England Patriots
- Position: Defensive tackle
- Roster status: Active

Personal information
- Born: January 17, 2003 (age 23)
- Listed height: 6 ft 3 in (1.91 m)
- Listed weight: 312 lb (142 kg)

Career information
- High school: Gadsden County (Havana, Florida)
- College: Florida State (2021–2024)
- NFL draft: 2025: 4th round, 137th overall pick

Career history
- New England Patriots (2025–present)
- Stats at Pro Football Reference

Joshua Dontrell Farmer (born January 17, 2003) is an American professional football defensive end for the New England Patriots of the National Football League (NFL). He played college football for the Florida State Seminoles and was selected by the Patriots in the fourth round of the 2025 NFL draft.

== Early life ==
Farmer attended Gadsden County High School in Havana, Florida. He was rated as a three-star recruit and committed to play college football for the Florida State Seminoles.

== College career ==
As a freshman in 2021, Farmer appeared in four games where he made one tackle. In 2022, he totaled 15 tackles with six being for a loss, and two sacks. After the season, Farmer entered his name into the NCAA transfer portal, but withdrew his name shortly afterward. In the 2023 season opener, he recorded three tackles and a sack in a win over LSU. Farmer finished the year with 32 tackles with seven being for a loss, five sacks, and two pass deflections for the Seminoles.

== Professional career ==
Pre-draft measurables
Height	Weight	Arm length	Hand span	Wingspan	40-yard dash	10-yard split	20-yard split	Vertical jump	Broad jump	Bench press
6 ft 3 1/4 in (1.91 m)	305 lb (138 kg)	35 in (0.89 m)	10 1/4 in (0.26 m)	6 ft 11 3/8 in (2.12 m)	5.11 s	1.77 s	2.96 s	29.0 in (0.74 m)	9 ft 4 in (2.84 m)	26 reps
All values from NFL Combine

Farmer was drafted by the New England Patriots in the fourth round, as the 137th overall selection in the 2025 NFL draft. He was placed on injured reserve on December 23, 2025, due to a hamstring injury. Farmer finished his rookie season with 15 tackles through 13 games (including three starts).
