= Antwaun Powell-Ryland =

American football player (born 2002)

St. Louis Battlehawks
- Position: Linebacker
- Roster status: Unsigned draft pick

Personal information
- Born: February 23, 2002 (age 24); Portsmouth, Virginia, U.S.
- Listed height: 6 ft 3 in (1.91 m)
- Listed weight: 258 lb (117 kg)

Career information
- High school: Indian River (Chesapeake, Virginia)
- College: Florida (2020–2022); Virginia Tech (2023–2024)
- NFL draft: 2025: 6th round, 209th overall pick

Career history
- Philadelphia Eagles (2025)*; Cincinnati Bengals (2025)*; St. Louis Battlehawks (2027-present)
- * Offseason or practice squad member only

Awards and highlights
- Dudley Award (2024)
- Stats at Pro Football Reference

Antwaun Powell-Ryland Jr. (born February 23, 2002) is an American professional football linebacker. He played college football for the Florida Gators and Virginia Tech Hokies. Powell-Ryland was selected by the Philadelphia Eagles in the sixth round of the 2025 NFL draft.

== Early life ==
Powell-Ryland attended Indian River High School in Chesapeake, Virginia. He was selected to play in the 2020 Under Armour All-America Game. He committed to the University of Florida to play college football.

== College career ==
After appearing in two games his first year at Florida in 2020, Powell-Ryland played in 12 games in 2021 and had five tackles and 1.5 sacks. In 2022, he played in all 13 games with five starts and recorded 29 tackles and three sacks. After the season, he entered the transfer portal and transferred to Virginia Tech. After playing linebacker at Florida, Powell-Ryland converted to a defensive end at Virginia Tech and became a starter his first year in 2023.

== Professional career ==
Pre-draft measurables
Height	Weight	Arm length	Hand span	Wingspan	40-yard dash	10-yard split	20-yard split	Vertical jump	Broad jump
6 ft 2 5/8 in (1.90 m)	258 lb (117 kg)	31 1/4 in (0.79 m)	9 5/8 in (0.24 m)	6 ft 4 1/8 in (1.93 m)	4.69 s	1.64 s	2.72 s	38.0 in (0.97 m)	10 ft 4 in (3.15 m)
All values from NFL Combine/Pro Day

=== Philadelphia Eagles ===
Powell-Ryland was selected by the Philadelphia Eagles with the 209th overall pick in the sixth round of the 2025 NFL draft. He was waived on August 26 as part of final roster cuts and re-signed to the practice squad the next day. Powell-Ryland was released on September 5. On October 1, he was re-signed to the practice squad. Powell-Ryland was released on November 8.

=== Cincinnati Bengals ===
On November 10, 2025, Powell-Ryland was signed to the Cincinnati Bengals' practice squad. He signed a reserve/future contract with Cincinnati on January 5, 2026. On August 30, Powell-Ryland was waived by the Bengals as a part of final roster cuts.
