= Ozzy Trapilo =

American football player (born 2001)

No. 75 – Chicago Bears
- Position: Offensive tackle
- Roster status: Active

Personal information
- Born: October 17, 2001 (age 25)
- Listed height: 6 ft 8 in (2.03 m)
- Listed weight: 312 lb (142 kg)

Career information
- High school: Boston College (Boston, Massachusetts)
- College: Boston College (2020–2024)
- NFL draft: 2025: 2nd round, 56th overall pick

Career history
- Chicago Bears (2025–present)

Awards and highlights
- First-team All-ACC (2024); Second-team All-ACC (2023)

Career NFL statistics as of 2025
- Games played: 14
- Games started: 6
- Stats at Pro Football Reference

Ozzy Trapilo (born October 17, 2001) is an American professional football offensive tackle for the Chicago Bears of the National Football League (NFL). He played college football for the Boston College Eagles and was selected by the Bears in the second round of the 2025 NFL draft.

== Early life ==
Trapilo attended Boston College High School in Boston, Massachusetts. He was rated as a three-star recruit and held offers from schools such as Boston College, Duke, Georgia Tech, Louisville, Michigan, Nebraska, Northwestern, Rutgers, UConn, and Wake Forest. Ultimately, Trapilo committed to play college football for the Boston College Eagles.

== College career ==
After taking a redshirt in 2020, Trapilo played 32 games, with 24 starts from 2021 to 2023. He made his debut during the 2021 season versus Colgate. During that time, Trapilo made 12 of his starts at left tackle and 12 starts at right tackle. Trapilo was also named second-team all-Atlantic Coast Conference (ACC) in 2023. For his performance during week 13 of the 2024 season, Trapilo was named the ACC offensive lineman of the week after the Eagles win over North Carolina.

== Professional career ==
Pre-draft measurables
Height	Weight	Arm length	Hand span	Wingspan	40-yard dash	10-yard split	20-yard split	20-yard shuttle	Three-cone drill	Broad jump	Bench press
6 ft 8 1/8 in (2.04 m)	316 lb (143 kg)	33 in (0.84 m)	10 3/8 in (0.26 m)	6 ft 9 in (2.06 m)	5.21 s	1.77 s	2.98 s	4.70 s	7.71 s	8 ft 10 in (2.69 m)	22 reps
All values from NFL Combine

Trapilo was selected by the Chicago Bears with the 56th pick in the second round of the 2025 NFL draft.

After competing for a starting tackle job in the offseason, Trapilo began his rookie year as a backup who was inactive for the first three games. He made his NFL debut in Week 4 against the Las Vegas Raiders when he took over at right tackle in the second quarter. Trapilo saw increased usage as an extra blocker throughout the season after that. His first NFL start came in the Week 12 win over the Pittsburgh Steelers at left tackle, where he allowed just one quarterback pressure on 65 plays. Trapilo injured his patellar tendon during the Bears' wild card game on January 10, 2026, ending his season.

The injury prevented Trapilo from working out with the Bears for much of the 2026 offseason, so he was designated as physically unable to perform on July 25. He was activated from the PUP list on August 16, allowing him to join the team for training camp while practicing on what head coach Ben Johnson called "his own timetable". After missing the first five games, Trapilo entered Week 6 against the Atlanta Falcons for a drive in the second quarter.

== Personal life ==
Trapilo is the son of former NFL offensive guard Steve Trapilo, who also played at Boston College, where he was an All-American.
