= Konata Mumpfield =

American football player (born 2002)

No. 4 – Los Angeles Rams
- Position: Wide receiver
- Roster status: Active

Personal information
- Born: October 24, 2002 (age 24); Hoschton, Georgia, U.S.
- Listed height: 5 ft 11 in (1.80 m)
- Listed weight: 188 lb (85 kg)

Career information
- High school: Dacula (Dacula, Georgia)
- College: Akron (2021); Pittsburgh (2022–2024)
- NFL draft: 2025: 7th round, 242nd overall pick

Career history
- Los Angeles Rams (2025–present)

Awards and highlights
- Second-team All-MAC (2021)

Career NFL statistics as of Week 9, 2026
- Receptions: 21
- Receiving yards: 254
- Receiving touchdowns: 2
- Stats at Pro Football Reference

Konata Mumpfield (born October 24, 2002) is an American professional football wide receiver for the Los Angeles Rams of the National Football League (NFL). He played college football for the Akron Zips and Pittsburgh Panthers and was selected by the Rams in the seventh round of the 2025 NFL draft.

== Early life ==
Mumpfield was born in Hoschton, Georgia. He attended Dacula High School in Dacula, Georgia, where, as a senior, he totaled 43 catches for 820 yards and 13 touchdowns, as well as three punt return touchdowns. Coming out of high school, he was rated as a two-star recruit and committed to play college football for the Akron Zips.

== College career ==
=== Akron ===
In week 4 of the 2021 season, Mumpfield notched seven receptions for 67 yards and a touchdown versus Ohio State. In week 11, he totaled 122 receiving yards and two touchdowns versus Western Michigan. Mumpfield finished his freshman season with 63 receptions for 751 yards and eight touchdowns, earning freshman all-American and second-team all-MAC honors. After the season, Mumpfield entered his name into the NCAA transfer portal.

=== Pittsburgh ===
Mumpfield transferred to play for the Pittsburgh Panthers. In week 3 of the 2022 season, he notched his first touchdown with the Panthers in a win over Western Michigan. Mumpfield finished the season with 58 receptions for 551 yards and a touchdown. In the 2023 season, he totaled 44 catches for 576 yards and five touchdowns. Mumpfield finished the 2024 season with 52 receptions for 813 yards and five touchdowns for the Panthers.

== Professional career ==
Pre-draft measurables
Height	Weight	Arm length	Hand span	Wingspan	40-yard dash	10-yard split	20-yard split	20-yard shuttle	Three-cone drill	Vertical jump	Broad jump
5 ft 11 3/8 in (1.81 m)	186 lb (84 kg)	29 3/8 in (0.75 m)	8 1/2 in (0.22 m)	6 ft 2 3/8 in (1.89 m)	4.59 s	1.54 s	2.67 s	4.19 s	6.77 s	36.0 in (0.91 m)	10 ft 4 in (3.15 m)
All values from NFL Combine/Pro Day

Mumpfield was selected by the Los Angeles Rams in the seventh round (No. 242 overall) in the 2025 NFL draft.

=== 2025 season ===
Mumpfield scored his first career touchdown on a 5-yard reception in the Rams' 35-7 victory over the Jacksonville Jaguars at Wembley Stadium in London, England. He played in all 17 regular season games, finishing the season with 10 receptions for 92 yards and a touchdown. In the Rams' 34-31 win over Carolina Panthers, Mumpfield had one catch for 11 yards which helped to set up L.A.'s game-winning touchdown.

=== 2026 season ===
In Week 3 against the Denver Broncos, Mumpfield had a breakout performance with four receptions for 93 yards including a 48-yard touchdown in the fourth quarter of the Rams' 30-26 loss.

== NFL career statistics ==
=== Regular season ===
Year	Team	Games		Receiving						Fumbles	
Year	Team	GP	GS	Tgt	Rec	Yds	Avg	Lng	TD	Fum	Lost
2025	LAR	17	0	23	10	92	9.2	19	1	0	0
2026	LAR	9	2	23	11	162	14.7	48	1	0	0
Career		26	2	46	21	254	12.1	48	2	0	0

=== Postseason ===
Year	Team	Games		Receiving					Fumbles	
Year	Team	GP	GS	Rec	Yds	Avg	Lng	TD	Fum	Lost
2025	LAR	3	0	3	22	7.3	11	0	0	0
Career		3	0	3	22	7.3	11	0	0	0
