= 2022 Florida State Seminoles football team =

American college football season

2022 Florida State Seminoles football

Cheez-It Bowl champion

Cheez-It Bowl, W 35–32 vs. Oklahoma
- Conference: Atlantic Coast Conference
- Atlantic Division

Ranking
- Coaches: No. 10
- AP: No. 11
- Record: 10–3 (5–3 ACC)
- Head coach: Mike Norvell (3rd season)
- Offensive coordinator: Alex Atkins (1st season)
- Offensive scheme: Multiple
- Defensive coordinator: Adam Fuller (3rd season)
- Co-defensive coordinator: Randy Shannon (1st season)
- Base defense: 4–3
- Captain: Game captains
- Home stadium: Doak Campbell Stadium

2022 Atlantic Coast Conference football standings
	Conf.			Overall
Team	W		L	W		L
Atlantic Division
No. 13 Clemson xy$	8	–	0	11	–	3
No. 11 Florida State	5	–	3	10	–	3
Louisville	4	–	4	8	–	5
NC State	4	–	4	8	–	5
Syracuse	4	–	4	7	–	6
Wake Forest	3	–	5	8	–	5
Boston College	2	–	6	3	–	9
Coastal Division
North Carolina xy	6	–	2	9	–	5
Duke	5	–	3	9	–	4
No. 22 Pittsburgh	5	–	3	9	–	4
Georgia Tech	4	–	4	5	–	7
Miami (FL)	3	–	5	5	–	7
Virginia	1	–	6	3	–	7
Virginia Tech	1	–	6	3	–	8
Championship: Clemson 39, North Carolina 10
$ – Conference champion; x – Division champion/co-champions; y – Championship game participant; Rankings from AP Poll

The 2022 Florida State Seminoles football team represented Florida State University during the 2022 NCAA Division I FBS football season. The Seminoles played their home games at Doak Campbell Stadium in Tallahassee, Florida, and competed as members of the Atlantic Coast Conference. They were led by head coach Mike Norvell, in his third season.

== Schedule ==
Date	Time	Opponent	Rank	Site	TV	Result	Attendance	Source
August 27	5:00 p.m.	Duquesne*		Doak Campbell Stadium; Tallahassee, FL	ACCN	W 47–7	51,207	
September 4	7:30 p.m.	vs. LSU*		Caesars Superdome; New Orleans, LA (Louisiana Kickoff)	ABC	W 24–23	68,388	
September 16	7:30 p.m.	at Louisville		Cardinal Stadium; Louisville, KY	ESPN	W 35–31	46,459	
September 24	8:00 p.m.	Boston College		Doak Campbell Stadium; Tallahassee, FL	ACCN	W 44–14	79,560	
October 1	3:30 p.m.	No. 22 Wake Forest^{†}	No. 23	Doak Campbell Stadium; Tallahassee, FL	ABC	L 21–31	69,749	
October 8	8:00 p.m.	at No. 14 NC State		Carter–Finley Stadium; Raleigh, NC	ACCN	L 17–19	56,919	
October 15	7:30 p.m.	No. 4 Clemson		Doak Campbell Stadium; Tallahassee, FL (rivalry)	ABC	L 28–34	71,098	
October 29	12:00 p.m.	Georgia Tech		Doak Campbell Stadium; Tallahassee, FL	ACCN	W 41–16	61,007	
November 5	7:30 p.m.	at Miami (FL)		Hard Rock Stadium; Miami Gardens, FL (rivalry)	ABC	W 45–3	66,200	
November 12	8:00 p.m.	at Syracuse	No. 23	JMA Wireless Dome; Syracuse, NY	ACCN	W 38–3	45,213	
November 19	12:00 p.m.	Louisiana*	No. 19	Doak Campbell Stadium; Tallahassee, FL	ACCRSN	W 49–17	58,597	
November 25	7:30 p.m.	Florida*	No. 16	Doak Campbell Stadium; Tallahassee, FL (rivalry)	ABC	W 45–38	79,560	
December 29	5:30 p.m.	vs. Oklahoma*	No. 13	Camping World Stadium; Orlando, FL (Cheez-It Bowl)	ESPN	W 35–32	61,520	
*Non-conference game; ^{†}Homecoming; Rankings from AP Poll (and CFP Rankings, after November 1) - Released prior to game; All times are in Eastern time

== Game summaries ==
=== Duquesne ===
	1	2	3	4	Total
Dukes	0	0	7	0	7
Seminoles	20	6	14	7	47

=== Vs. LSU ===
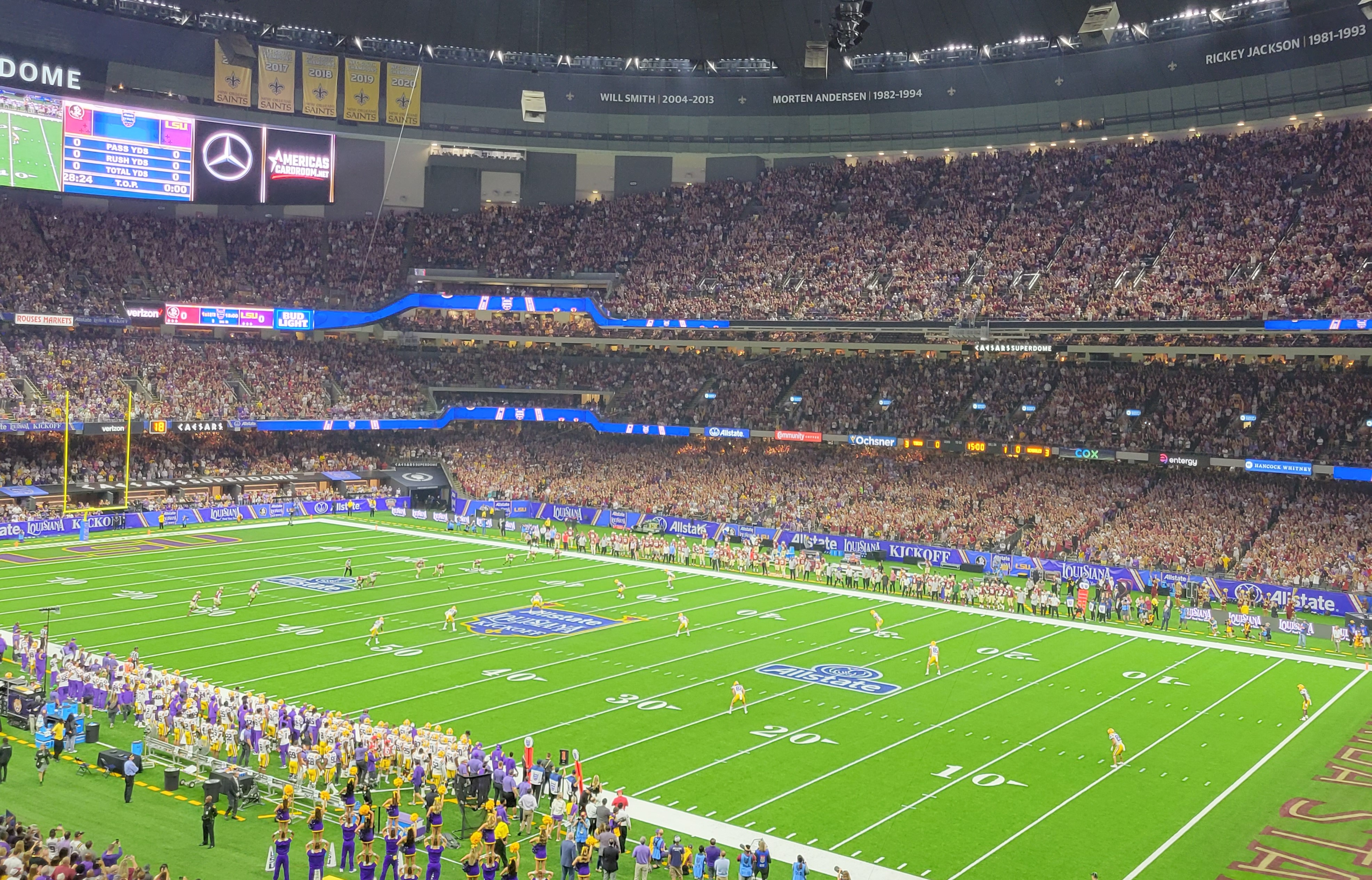
Florida State opened the season against LSU.

	1	2	3	4	Total
Tigers	3	0	7	13	23
Seminoles	0	7	10	7	24

=== At Louisville ===
	1	2	3	4	Total
Seminoles	14	0	7	14	35
Cardinals	14	7	0	10	31

=== Boston College ===
	1	2	3	4	Total
Eagles	0	0	7	7	14
Seminoles	21	10	6	7	44

=== No. 22 Wake Forest ===
	1	2	3	4	Total
No. 22 Demon Deacons	7	14	7	3	31
No. 23 Seminoles	7	0	6	8	21

=== At No. 14 NC State ===
	1	2	3	4	Total
Seminoles	0	17	0	0	17
No. 14 Wolfpack	3	0	10	6	19

=== No. 4 Clemson ===
	1	2	3	4	Total
No. 4 Tigers	7	17	10	0	34
Seminoles	7	7	0	14	28

=== Georgia Tech ===
	1	2	3	4	Total
Yellow Jackets	3	0	7	6	16
Seminoles	7	17	7	10	41

=== At Miami ===
	1	2	3	4	Total
Seminoles	14	17	0	14	45
Hurricanes	3	0	0	0	3

=== At Syracuse ===
	1	2	3	4	Total
No. 23 Seminoles	14	10	14	0	38
Orange	0	3	0	0	3

=== Louisiana ===
	1	2	3	4	Total
Ragin' Cajuns	0	3	0	14	17
No. 19 Seminoles	21	14	14	0	49

=== Florida ===
	1	2	3	4	Total
Gators	14	10	0	14	38
No. 16 Seminoles	14	7	17	7	45

=== Vs. Oklahoma–Cheez-It Bowl ===
	1	2	3	4	Total
Sooners	7	10	0	15	32
No. 13 Seminoles	3	8	7	17	35

== Rankings ==
Ranking movements Legend: ██ Increase in ranking ██ Decrease in ranking — = Not ranked RV = Received votes
	Week															
Poll	Pre	1	2	3	4	5	6	7	8	9	10	11	12	13	14	Final
AP	—	RV	RV	RV	23	RV	RV	RV	RV	RV	25	20	16	14	13	11
Coaches	RV	RV	RV	RV	22	RV	RV	—	—	—	RV	20	16	14	13	10
CFP	Not released									—	23	19	16	13	13	Not released

== Coaching staff ==
Florida State Seminoles coaches

Head coach

- Mike Norvell

Assistant coaches

- Alex Atkins – Offensive coordinator/offensive line
- Adam Fuller – Co-defensive coordinator
- Randy Shannon – Co-defensive coordinator/linebackers
- John Papuchis – Special teams/defensive ends
- Chris Thomsen – Deputy head coach/tight ends
- Odell Haggins – Associate head coach/defensive tackles
- Tony Tokarz – Quarterbacks
- Ron Dugans – Wide receivers
- David Johnson – Running backs/recruiting coordinator
- Marcus Woodson – Defensive backs/defensive passing game coordinator
- Josh Storms – Strength and conditioning

== Awards ==
=== Watchlists ===
Award	Player
Maxwell Award	Jordan Travis
Doak Walker Award	Treshaun Ward
John Mackey Award	Camren McDonald
Dick Butkus Award	Tatum Bethune
Jim Thorpe Award	Jammie Robinson
Bronko Nagurski Trophy	Jammie Robinson
Ray Guy Award	Alex Mastromanno
Wuerffel Trophy	Dillan Gibbons
Chuck Bednarik Award	Jammie Robinson; Jared Verse
Johnny Unitas Golden Arm Award	Jordan Travis

=== Honors ===
Weekly Honors
Player	Award	Ref.
Ontaria Wilson	ACC Receiver of the Week (Week One)	
Jared Verse	ACC Defensive Lineman of the Week (Week One)	
Shyheim Brown	ACC Specialist of the Week (Week One)	
Johnny Wilson	ACC Receiver of the Week (Week Three)	
Jammie Robinson	ACC Defensive Back of the Week (Week Five)	
Trey Benson	ACC Running Back of the Week (Week Nine); ACC Running Back of the Week (Week Ten); ACC Running Back of the Week (Week Eleven); ACC Running Back of the Week (Week Thirteen)	
D’Mitri Emmanuel	ACC Offensive Lineman of the Week (Week Nine)	
Dillan Gibbons	ACC Offensive Lineman of the Week (Week Ten)	
Maurice Smith	ACC Offensive Lineman of the Week (Week Eleven); ACC Offensive Lineman of the Week (Week Thirteen)	

Yearly Honors
Player	Award	Ref.
Dillan Gibbons	Wuerffel Trophy; Jim Tatum Award; First Team All-ACC (Offense)	
Jared Verse	First Team All-American (Defense); First Team All-ACC (Defense)	
Jammie Robinson	First Team All-ACC (Defense)	
Jordan Travis	Second Team All-ACC (Offense); Cheez-It Bowl MVP	
Trey Benson	Second Team All-ACC (Offense)	
Johnny Wilson	Second Team All-ACC (Offense)	
Robert Scott	Second Team All-ACC (Offense)	
D’Mitri Emmanuel	Third Team All-ACC (Offense)	
Treshaun Ward	Honorable Mention All-ACC	
Maurice Smith	Honorable Mention All-ACC	
Fabien Lovett	Honorable Mention All-ACC	
Robert Cooper	Honorable Mention All-ACC	
Tatum Bethune	Honorable Mention All-ACC	
Renardo Green	Honorable Mention All-ACC	
Mycah Pittman	Honorable Mention All-ACC	
Patrick Payton	ACC Defensive Rookie of the Year	

== Players drafted into the NFL ==
Round	Pick	Player	Position	NFL Club
5	11 (145)	Jammie Robinson	S	Carolina Panthers
