= 2024 Florida State Seminoles football team =

American college football season

2024 Florida State Seminoles football
- Conference: Atlantic Coast Conference
- Record: 2–10 (1–7 ACC)
- Head coach: Mike Norvell (5th season)
- Offensive coordinator: Alex Atkins (Note: Offensive Coordinator Alex Atkins was suspended for the first three games of the season due to NCAA recruiting violations related to the use of NIL; offensive analyst Gabe Fertitta served as offensive coordinator during the suspension.) (3rd season; games 4–10); Gabe Fertitta (games 1–3)
- Offensive scheme: Multiple
- Defensive coordinator: Adam Fuller (5th season; first 10 games)
- Co-defensive coordinator: Randy Shannon (3rd season)
- Base defense: 4–3
- Captain: Game captains
- Home stadium: Doak Campbell Stadium

2024 Atlantic Coast Conference football standings
	Conf.			Overall
Team	W		L	W		L
No. 12 SMU y^	8	–	0	11	–	3
No. 14 Clemson y$^	7	–	1	10	–	4
No. 18 Miami (FL)	6	–	2	10	–	3
No. 20 Syracuse	5	–	3	10	–	3
Duke	5	–	3	9	–	4
Louisville	5	–	3	9	–	4
Georgia Tech	5	–	3	7	–	6
Boston College	4	–	4	7	–	6
Virginia Tech	4	–	4	6	–	7
Pittsburgh	3	–	5	7	–	6
NC State	3	–	5	6	–	7
North Carolina	3	–	5	6	–	7
Virginia	3	–	5	5	–	7
California	2	–	6	6	–	7
Wake Forest	2	–	6	4	–	8
Stanford	2	–	6	3	–	9
Florida State	1	–	7	2	–	10
Championship: Clemson 34, SMU 31
^ – College Football Playoff participant; $ – Conference champion; y – Championship game participant; Rankings from AP Poll

The 2024 Florida State Seminoles football team represented Florida State University in the Atlantic Coast Conference during the 2024 NCAA Division I FBS football season, entering the season as the defending ACC champion. The Seminoles were led by Mike Norvell, who was in his fifth year as their head coach. The Seminoles played home games at Doak Campbell Stadium, with a reduced capacity due to renovations, located in Tallahassee, Florida.

Despite high pre-season expectations and a top ten ranking in the polls, the Seminoles had a disastrous season, finishing with their worst record in a season since 1974. They became the first team in the CFP era to go from double-digit wins to double-digit losses the following year as well as the first team in college football history to start the season in the top ten and finish with double-digit losses. The Seminoles became bowl ineligible following a loss to rival Miami, making the first time a defending power conference champion missed a bowl game since USC in 2018. (Note: This does not include LSU in 2020, who finished 5-5 after winning the SEC and national championship the season before. Despite the NCAA waiving bowl eligibility requirements due to the COVID-19 pandemic, LSU announced a self-imposed bowl ban due to an NCAA investigation involving improper booster payments, which later resulted in the vacation of their wins from 2012 to 2015.) In their 7th game, the Seminoles lost to Duke for the first time in school history, after the Seminoles had won the first 22 games in the series. Following a subsequent loss to North Carolina, the Seminoles finished 1–7 in ACC play, making their worst conference record in program history. This loss also resulted in North Carolina coach Mack Brown's first ever win over the Seminoles in his coaching career. After a nationally televised blowout loss to Notre Dame, Norvell fired offensive coordinator and offensive line coach Alex Atkins, defensive coordinator Adam Fuller, and wide receivers coach Ron Dugans.

Following the last game of the season, Gus Malzahn was hired as offensive coordinator and quarterbacks coach, and Tony White was hired as defensive coordinator. Other coaching changes at the conclusion of the season included hiring Herb Hand as offensive line coach, Evan Cooper as safeties coach, Tim Harris Jr. as wide receivers coach, and Terrance Knighton as defensive line coach. Defensive assistant Randy Shannon was not retained. Punter Alex Mastromanno was named a consensus All-American player for his accomplishments during the season, becoming the forty-sixth player in program history to achieve this recognition.

== Preseason ==
The conference released its pre-season poll on July 31 during media days. The Seminoles were predicted to finish first in the conference, receiving 81 of the 170 first-place votes.

Predicted finish	Team	Votes (1st place)
1	Florida State	2,708 (81)
2	Clemson	2,657 (55)
3	Miami	2,344 (17)
4	NC State	2,318 (8)
5	Louisville	1,984
6	Virginia Tech	1,968 (5)
7	SMU	1,798
8	North Carolina	1,712
9	Georgia Tech	1,539 (1)
10	California	1,095 (2)
11	Duke	1,056
12	Syracuse	1,035
13	Pittsburgh	1,016
14	Boston College	890 (1)
15	Wake Forest	784
16	Virginia	629
17	Stanford	477

== Schedule ==
Date	Time	Opponent	Rank	Site	TV	Result	Attendance
August 24	12:00 p.m.	vs. Georgia Tech	No. 10	Aviva Stadium; Dublin, Ireland (Aer Lingus College Football Classic, College GameDay)	ESPN	L 21–24	47,998
September 2	7:30 p.m.	Boston College	No. 10	Doak Campbell Stadium; Tallahassee, FL (ACC Huddle)	ESPN	L 13–28	51,719
September 14	12:00 p.m.	Memphis*		Doak Campbell Stadium; Tallahassee, FL	ESPN	L 12–20	55,107
September 21	7:00 p.m.	California		Doak Campbell Stadium; Tallahassee, FL	ESPN2	W 14–9	55,107
September 28	8:00 p.m.	at SMU		Gerald J. Ford Stadium; University Park, TX	ACCN	L 16–42	34,879
October 5	7:00 p.m.	No. 15 Clemson		Doak Campbell Stadium; Tallahassee, FL (rivalry)	ESPN	L 13–29	55,107
October 18	7:00 p.m.	at Duke		Wallace Wade Stadium; Durham, NC	ESPN2	L 16–23	30,735
October 26	7:00 p.m.	at No. 6 Miami (FL)		Hard Rock Stadium; Miami Gardens, FL (rivalry)	ESPN	L 14–36	66,200
November 2	3:30 p.m.	North Carolina		Doak Campbell Stadium; Tallahassee, FL	ACCN	L 11–35	55,107
November 9	7:30 p.m.	at No. 10 Notre Dame*		Notre Dame Stadium; Notre Dame, IN (rivalry)	NBC/Peacock	L 3–52	77,622
November 23	1:30 p.m.	Charleston Southern*^{†}		Doak Campbell Stadium; Tallahassee, FL	ACCNX/ESPN+	W 41–7	43,711
November 30	7:00 p.m.	Florida*		Doak Campbell Stadium; Tallahassee, FL (rivalry)	ESPN2	L 11–31	55,107
*Non-conference game; ^{†}Homecoming; Rankings from AP Poll - released prior to game; All times are in Eastern time

== Rankings ==
Ranking movements Legend: ██ Increase in ranking ██ Decrease in ranking — = Not ranked
	Week																
Poll	Pre	1	2	3	4	5	6	7	8	9	10	11	12	13	14	15	Final
AP	10	—	—	—	—	—	—	—	—	—	—	—	—	—	—	—	—
Coaches	10	—	—	—	—	—	—	—	—	—	—	—	—	—	—	—	—
CFP	Not released										—	—	—	—	—	—	Not released

== Game summaries ==
=== vs. Georgia Tech ===
Game One – No. 10 Florida State Seminoles (0–0) vs. Georgia Tech Yellow Jackets (0–0) – Game summary

Quarter	1	2	3	4	Total
No. 10 Seminoles	8	6	0	7	21
Yellow Jackets	7	7	0	10	24

at Aviva Stadium • Dublin, Ireland

- Date: Saturday, August 24, 2024
- Game time: 12:00 p.m.
- Game attendance: 47,998
- Referee: Jerry Magallanes
- TV announcers (ESPN): Joe Tessitore (play-by-play), Jesse Palmer (analyst), and Katie George (sideline reporter)

Game information

First quarter

- 10:58, FSU – Lawrance Toafili 28-yard run (Brian Courtney run) (Drive: 7 plays, 75 yards, 4:02; Florida State 8-0)
- 7:26, GT – Zach Pyron 1-yard run (Aidan Birr kick) (Drive: 6 plays, 79 yards, 3:32; Florida State 8-7)

Second quarter

- 11:06, FSU – Ryan Fitzgerald 52-yard field goal (Drive: 8 plays, 41 yards, 5:11; Florida State 11-7)
- 3:13, GT – Jamal Haynes 1-yard run (Aidan Birr kick) (Drive: 14 plays, 75 yards, 7:53; Georgia Tech 14-11)
- 0:00, FSU – Ryan Fitzgerald 59-yard field goal (Drive: 9 plays, 34 yards, 3:13; Tied 14-14)

Third quarter

- No scoring

Fourth quarter

- 14:57, GT – Jamal Haynes 2-yard run (Aidan Birr kick) (Drive: 11 plays, 89 yards, 6:22; Georgia Tech 21-14)
- 6:33, FSU – Roydell Williams 1-yard run (Ryan Fitzgerald kick) (Drive: 15 plays, 84 yards, 8:24; Tied 21-21)
- 0:00, GT – Aidan Birr 44-yard field goal (Drive: 12 plays, 49 yards, 6:33; Georgia Tech 24-21)

Statistics	FSU	GT
First downs	20	18
Total yards	58–291	52–336
Rushing yards	31–98	36–190
Passing yards	193	146
Passing: Comp–Att–Int	19–27–0	11–16–0
Time of possession	30:39	29:21

Team	Category	Player	Statistics
Florida State	Passing	DJ Uiagalelei	19/27, 193 yards
Florida State	Rushing	Roydell Williams	12 carries, 38 yards, TD
Florida State	Receiving	Ja'Khi Douglas	4 receptions, 55 yards
Georgia Tech	Passing	Haynes King	11/16, 146 yards
Georgia Tech	Rushing	Jamal Haynes	11 carries, 75 yards, 2 TD
Georgia Tech	Receiving	Malik Rutherford	4 receptions, 66 yards

=== vs. Boston College ===
Game Two – Boston College Eagles (0–0) vs No. 10 Florida State Seminoles (0–1) – Game summary

Quarter	1	2	3	4	Total
Eagles	0	14	14	0	28
No. 10 Seminoles	0	6	7	0	13

at Doak Campbell Stadium • Tallahassee, FL

- Date: Monday, September 2, 2024
- Game time: 7:30 p.m.
- Game weather: Partly cloudy, 93 °F (34 °C)
- Game attendance: 51,719
- Referee: Gary Patterson
- TV announcers (ESPN): Bob Wischusen (play-by-play), Louis Riddick (analyst), and Kris Budden (sideline reporter)

Game information

First quarter

- No scoring

Second quarter

- 14:56, BC – Thomas Castellanos 4-yard run (Luca Lombardo kick), (Drive: 14 plays, 71 yards, 9:18; Boston College 7–0)
- 9:58, BC – Treshaun Ward 13-yard pass from Thomas Castellanos (Luca Lombardo kick), (Drive: 7 plays, 68 yards, 3:19; Boston College 14–0)
- 5:05, FSU – Ryan Fitzgerald 31-yard field goal, (Drive: 7 plays, 22 yards, 2:03; Boston College 14–3)
- 0:25, FSU – Ryan Fitzgerald 24-yard field goal, (Drive: 13 plays, 70 yards, 2:35; Boston College 14–6)

Third quarter

- 11:58, BC – Kye Robichaux 4-yard pass from Thomas Castellanos (Luca Lombardo kick), (Drive: 2 plays, 7 yards, 0:43; Boston College 21–6)
- 5:19, FSU – Kentron Poitier 29-yard pass from DJ Uiagalelei (Ryan Fitzgerald kick), (Drive: 5 plays, 72 yards, 1:58; Boston College 21–13)
- 1:03, BC – Kye Robichaux 2-yard run (Luca Lombardo kick), (Drive: 8 plays, 60 yards, 4:16; Boston College 28–13)

Fourth quarter

- No scoring

Statistics	BC	FSU
First downs	19	13
Total yards	369	293
Rushing yards	263	21
Passing yards	106	272
Passing: Comp–Att–Int	10-16-0	21–42–1
Time of possession	39:09	20:51

Team	Category	Player	Statistics
Boston College	Passing	Thomas Castellanos	10/16, 106 yards, 2 TD
Boston College	Rushing	Kye Robichaux	19 carries, 85 yards, 1 TD
Boston College	Receiving	Treshaun Ward	3 receptions, 61 yards, 1 TD
Florida State	Passing	DJ Uiagalelei	21/42, 272 yards, 1 TD, 1 INT
Florida State	Rushing	Kam Davis	3 carries, 11 yards
Florida State	Receiving	Kentron Poitier	3 receptions, 79 yards, 1 TD

=== vs Memphis ===
Game Three – Memphis Tigers (2–0) vs Florida State Seminoles (0–2) – Game summary

Quarter	1	2	3	4	Total
Tigers	3	10	7	0	20
Seminoles	0	3	6	3	12

at Doak Campbell Stadium • Tallahassee, FL

- Date: Saturday, September 14, 2024
- Game time: 12:00 p.m.
- Game attendance: 55,107
- Referee: Justin Elliott
- TV announcers (ESPN): Bob Wischusen (play-by-play), Louis Riddick (analyst), and Kris Budden (sideline reporter)

Game information

First quarter

- 11:49, MEM – Caden Costa 35 yard field goal (Drive: 7 plays, 8 yards, 2:37; Memphis 3-0)

Second quarter

- 10:16, MEM – Greg Desrosiers Jr. 6-yard pass from Seth Henigan (Caden Costa kick), (Drive: 8 plays, 65 yards, 4:53; Memphis 10-0)
- 2:26, FSU – Ryan Fitzgerald 54-yard field goal, (8 plays, 15 yards, 2:15; Memphis 10-3)
- 0:00, MEM – Caden Costa 19-yard field goal, (9 plays, 27 yards, 1:59; Memphis 13-3)

Third quarter

- 8:27, MEM – Anthony Landphere 2-yard pass from Seth Henigan (Caden Costa kick), (12 plays, 75 yards, 6:33; Memphis 20-3)
- 7:05, FSU – Roydell Williams 4-yard run (Two-Point Run Conversion Failed), (3 plays, 75 yards, 1:22; Memphis 20-9)

Fourth quarter

- 8:07, FSU – Ryan Fitzgerald 25-yard field goal, (16 plays, 71 yards, 8:35; Memphis 20-12)

Statistics	MEM	FSU
First downs	19	11
Total yards	337	238
Rushing yards	65	37
Passing yards	272	201
Passing: Comp–Att–Int	25-39-1	16–31–1
Time of possession	36:21	23:39

Team	Category	Player	Statistics
Memphis	Passing	Seth Henigan	25/38, 272 yards, 2 TD, 1 INT
Memphis	Rushing	Mario Anderson	14 carries, 32 yards
Memphis	Receiving	Anthony Landphere	5 receptions, 66 yards, 1 TD
Florida State	Passing	DJ Uiagalelei	16/30, 201 yards, 1 INT
Florida State	Rushing	Lawrance Toafili	4 carries, 30 yards
Florida State	Receiving	Malik Benson	5 receptions, 99 yards

=== vs. California ===
Game Four – California Golden Bears (3–0) vs Florida State Seminoles (0–3) – Game summary

Quarter	1	2	3	4	Total
Golden Bears	0	6	3	0	9
Seminoles	7	0	0	7	14

at Doak Campbell Stadium • Tallahassee, FL

- Date: Saturday, September 21, 2024
- Game time: 7:00 p.m.
- Game attendance: 55,107
- Referee: Stuart Mullins
- TV announcers (ESPN2): Roy Philpott (play-by-play), Sam Acho (analyst), and Taylor Davis (sideline reporter)

Game information

First quarter

- 7:47, FSU – Lawrence Toafili 2-yard run (Ryan Fitzgerald kick) (Drive: 8 plays, 60 yards, 2:56; Florida State 7-0)

Second quarter

- 10:10, CAL – Ryan Coe 25-yard field goal (Drive: 6 plays, 68 yards, 2:42; Florida State 7-3)
- 0:00, CAL – Ryan Coe 29-yard field goal (Drive: 5 plays, 51 yards, 0:23; Florida State 7-6)

Third quarter

- 1:30, CAL – Ryan Coe 51-yard field goal (Drive: 8 plays, 42 yards, 2:46; California 9-7)

Fourth quarter

- 11:08, FSU – DJ Uiagalelei 36-yard pass to Ja'Khi Douglas (Ryan Fitzgerald kick) (Drive: 12 plays, 79 yards, 5:16; Florida State 14-9)

Statistics	CAL	FSU
First downs	23	17
Total yards	410	284
Rushing yards	107	107
Passing yards	303	177
Passing: Comp–Att–Int	22-37-1	16–27–1
Time of possession	29:19	30:41

Team	Category	Player	Statistics
California	Passing	Fernando Mendoza	22/36, 303 yards, 1 INT
California	Rushing	Jaydn Ott	16 carries, 73 yards
California	Receiving	Mason Starling	5 receptions, 68 yards
Florida State	Passing	DJ Uiagalelei	16/27, 177 yards, 1 TD, 1 INT
Florida State	Rushing	Lawrance Toafili	17 carries, 80 yards, 1 TD
Florida State	Receiving	Ja'Khi Douglas	4 receptions, 86 yards, 1 TD

=== at SMU ===
Game Five – Florida State Seminoles (1–3) at SMU Mustangs (3–1) – Game summary

Quarter	1	2	3	4	Total
Seminoles	7	2	7	0	16
Mustangs	7	7	14	14	42

at Gerald J. Ford Stadium • Dallas, TX

- Date: Saturday, September 28, 2024
- Game time: 8:00 p.m.
- Game weather: Clear, 85 °F (29 °C)
- Game attendance: 34,879
- Referee: Michael Griffith
- TV announcers (ACCN): Wes Durham (play-by-play), Tom Luginbill (analyst), and Dana Boyle (sideline reporter)

Game information

First quarter

- 9:44, SMU – Brashard Smith 13-yard run (Collin Rogers kick) (Drive: 11 plays, 75 yards, 5:16; SMU 7-0)
- 6:38, FSU – DJ Uiagalelei 9-yard pass to Kentron Poitier (Ryan Fitzgerald kick) (Drive: 7 plays, 75 yards, 3:06; Tied 7-7)

Second quarter

- 10:20, SMU – Kevin Jennings 42-yard pass Jordan Hudson (Collin Rogers kick) (Drive: 6 plays, 68 yards, 1:35; SMU 14-7)
- 0:22, SMU – Team run for a loss of 9 yards for a safety (Drive: 4 plays, 7 yards, 0:57; SMU 14-9)

Third quarter

- 13:00, SMU – Kevin Jennings 11-yard pass to RJ Maryland (Collin Rogers kick) (Drive: 3 plays, 11 yards, 1:10; SMU 21-9)
- 7:42, SMU – Kevin Jennings 15-yard pass to RJ Maryland (Collin Rogers kick) (Drive: 6 plays, 73 yards, 3:04; SMU 28-9)
- 4:44, FSU – DJ Uiagalelei 20-yard pass to Landen Thomas (Ryan Fitzgerald kick) (Drive: 8 plays, 75 yards, 2:57; SMU 28-16)

Fourth quarter

- 14:23, SMU – Roderick Daniels Jr. 2-yard run (Collin Rogers kick) (Drive: 11 plays, 75 yards, 5:22; SMU 35-16)
- 12:55, FSU – DJ Uiagalelei pass intercepted; Kobe Wilson 82-yard return (Collin Rogers kick) (Drive: 4 plays, 2 yards, 1:01; SMU 42-16)

Statistics	FSU	SMU
First downs	13	23
Total yards	297	467
Rushing yards	75	213
Passing yards	222	254
Passing: Comp–Att–Int	12-34-3	16–23–0
Time of possession	23:19	35:41

Team	Category	Player	Statistics
Florida State	Passing	DJ Uiagalelei	12/30, 222 yards, 2 TD, 3 INT
Florida State	Rushing	Lawrence Toafili	15 carries, 67 yards
Florida State	Receiving	Ja'Khi Douglas	2 receptions, 61 yards
SMU	Passing	Kevin Jennings	16/23, 254 yards, 3 TD
SMU	Rushing	Brashard Smith	17 carries, 129 yards, 1 TD
SMU	Receiving	Jake Bailey	2 receptions, 65 yards

=== vs. No. 15 Clemson ===
Game Six – No. 15 Clemson Tigers (3–1) vs Florida State Seminoles (1–4) – Game summary

Quarter	1	2	3	4	Total
No. 15 Tigers	17	6	0	6	29
Seminoles	0	7	0	6	13

at Doak Campbell Stadium • Tallahassee, FL

- Date: Saturday, October 5, 2024
- Game time: 7:00 p.m.
- Game attendance: 55,107
- Referee: Mike Roche
- TV announcers (ESPN): Mark Jones (play-by-play), Roddy Jones (analyst), and Quint Kessenich (sideline reporter)

Game information

First quarter

- 6:33, CLEM – Nolan Hauser 26-yard field goal (Drive: 12 plays, 66 yards, 5:32; Clemson 3-0)
- 3:20, CLEM – Antonio Williams 57-yard pass from Cade Klubnik (Nolan Hauser kick) (Drive: 2 plays, 58 yards, 0:44; Clemson 10-0)
- 0:02, CLEM – T.J. Moore 23-yard pass from Cade Klubnik (Nolan Hauser kick) (Drive: 4 plays, 50 yards, 1:06; Clemson 17-0)

Second quarter

- 11:11, FSU – Amaree Williams 13-yard pass from Brock Glenn (Ryan Fitzgerald kick) (Drive: 8 plays, 75 yards, 3:51; Clemson 17-7)
- 1:51, CLEM – Nolan Hauser 38-yard field goal (Drive: 9 plays, 51 yards, 3:07; Clemson 20-7)
- 0:00, CLEM – Nolan Hauser 25-yard field goal (Drive: 12 plays, 77 yards, 1:12; Clemson 23-7)

Third quarter

- No scoring

Fourth quarter

- 9:36, FSU – Ja'Khi Douglas 12-yard pass from Brock Glenn (two-point pass conversion failed)(Drive: 15 plays, 74 yards, 5:48; Clemson 23-13)
- 6:38, CLEM – Nolan Hauser 31-yard field goal (Drive: 5 plays, 61 yards, 2:58; Clemson 26-13)
- 1:54, CLEM – Nolan Hauser 24-yard field goal (Drive: 8 plays, 48 yards, 3:45; Clemson 29-13)

Statistics	CLEM	FSU
First downs	28	14
Total yards	500	250
Rushing yards	265	22
Passing yards	235	228
Passing: Comp–Att–Int	19-34-0	23–41–1
Time of possession	31:13	28:47

Team	Category	Player	Statistics
Clemson	Passing	Cade Klubnik	19/33, 235 yards, 2 TD
Clemson	Rushing	Phil Mafah	25 carries, 154 yards
Clemson	Receiving	Antonio Williams	3 receptions, 84 yards, 1 TD
Florida State	Passing	Brock Glenn	23/41, 228 yards, 2 TD, 1 INT
Florida State	Rushing	Lawrence Toafili	10 carries, 16 yards
Florida State	Receiving	Landen Thomas	7 receptions, 80 yards

=== at Duke ===
Game Seven – Florida State Seminoles (1–5) at Duke Blue Devils (5–1) – Game summary

Quarter	1	2	3	4	Total
Seminoles	3	3	7	3	16
Blue Devils	7	10	3	3	23

at Wallace Wade Stadium • Durham, NC

- Date: Friday, October 18, 2024
- Game time: 7:00 p.m.
- Game attendance: 30,735
- Referee: Marcus Woods
- TV announcers (ESPN2): Mike Monaco (play-by-play), Kirk Morrison (analyst), and Dawn Davenport (sideline reporter)

Game information

First quarter

- 10:20, FSU – Ryan Fitzgerald 23-yard field goal (Drive: 6 plays, 46 yards, 3:00; Florida State 3-0)
- 1:38, DUKE – Chandler Rivers 36-yard interception return (Todd Pelino kick) (Drive: 3 plays, 1 yard, 1:15; Duke 7-3)

Second quarter

- 11:43, DUKE – Star Thomas 2-yard run (Todd Pelino kick) (Drive: 10 plays, 36 yards, 4:43; Duke 14-3)
- 10:00, DUKE – Todd Pelino 27-yard field goal (Drive: 4 plays, 1 yard, 1:29; Duke 17-3)
- 1:46, FSU – Ryan Fitzgerald 53-yard field goal (Drive: 9 plays, 21 yards, 3:22; Duke 17-6)

Third quarter

- 14:49, FSU – Samuel Singleton Jr. 95-yard kickoff return (Ryan Fitzgerald kick) (Duke 17-13)
- 9:32, DUKE – Todd Pelino 44-yard field goal (Drive: 10 plays, 48 yards, 5:12; Duke 20-13)

Fourth quarter

- 11:35, FSU – Ryan Fitzgerald 38-yard field goal (Drive: 9 plays, 56 yards, 4:47; Duke 20-16)
- 8:58, DUKE – Todd Pelino 39-yard field goal (Drive: 5 plays, 53 yards, 2:37; Duke 23-16)

Statistics	FSU	DUKE
First downs	16	10
Total yards	291	180
Rushing yards	162	110
Passing yards	129	70
Passing: Comp–Att–Int	12–26–2	12–24–0
Time of possession	29:26	30:34

Team	Category	Player	Statistics
Florida State	Passing	Brock Glenn	9/19, 110 yards, 2 INT
Florida State	Rushing	Kam Davis	14 carries, 63 yards
Florida State	Receiving	Ja'Khi Douglas	4 receptions, 48 yards
Duke	Passing	Maalik Murphy	12/24, 70 yards
Duke	Rushing	Star Thomas	21 carries, 88 yards, 1 TD
Duke	Receiving	Que'Sean Brown	2 receptions, 20 yards

=== at No. 6 Miami (FL) ===
Game Eight – Florida State Seminoles (1–6) vs No. 6 Miami (FL) Hurricanes (7–0) – Game summary

Quarter	1	2	3	4	Total
Seminoles	0	7	0	7	14
No. 6 Hurricanes	7	10	6	13	36

at Hard Rock Stadium • Miami Gardens, FL

- Date: Saturday, October 26, 2024
- Game time: 7:00 p.m.
- Game attendance: 66,200
- Referee: Jerry Magallanes
- TV announcers (ESPN): Dave Pasch (play-by-play), Dusty Dvoracek (analyst), and Taylor McGregor (sideline reporter)

Game information

First quarter

- 12:22, MIAMI – Mark Fletcher Jr. 1-yard run (Andres Borregales kick) (Drive: 7 plays, 67 yards, 2:29; Miami 7-0)

Second quarter

- 14:09, MIAMI – Damien Martinez 18-yard run (Andres Borregales kick) (Drive: 13 plays, 95 yards, 5:00; Miami 14-0)
- 6:44, FSU – Caziah Holmes 1-yard run (Ryan Fitzgerald kick) (Drive: 12 plays, 78 yards, 7:15; Miami 14-7)
- 0:00, MIAMI – Andres Borregales 20-yard field goal (Drive: 18 plays, 88 yards, 6:35; Miami 17-7)

Third quarter

- 5:59, MIAMI – Andres Borregales 42-yard field goal (Drive: 11 plays, 30 yards, 5:04; Miami 20-7)
- 0:39, MIAMI – Andres Borregales 45-yard field goal (Drive: 7 plays, 31 yards, 2:37; Miami 23-7)

Fourth quarter

- 4:32, MIAMI – Cam Ward 7-yard pass from Elijah Arroyo (Two-Point Pass Conversion failed) (Drive: 11 plays, 55 yards, 07:12; Miami 29-7)
- 1:51, MIAMI – Damien Martinez 12-yard run (Andres Borregales kick) (Drive: 5 plays, 83 yards, 1:59; Miami 36-7)
- 0:18, FSU – Malik Benson 5-yard pass from Brock Glenn (Ryan Fitzgerald kick) (Drive: 12 plays, 75 yards, 1:33; Miami 36-14)

Statistics	FSU	MIA
First downs	14	31
Total yards	248	445
Rushing yards	133	230
Passing yards	115	215
Passing: Comp–Att–Int	11–32	23–36
Time of possession	24:37	35:23

Team	Category	Player	Statistics
Florida State	Passing	Luke Kromenhoek	6/14, 61 yards
Florida State	Rushing	Luke Kromenhoek	11 carries, 71 yards
Florida State	Receiving	Ja'Khi Douglas	1 reception, 29 yards
Miami (FL)	Passing	Cam Ward	22/35, 208 yards
Miami (FL)	Rushing	Damien Martinez	15 carries, 148 yards, 2 TD
Miami (FL)	Receiving	Isaiah Horton	6 receptions, 65 yards

=== vs. North Carolina ===
Game Nine – North Carolina Tar Heels (4–4) vs Florida State Seminoles (1–7) – Game summary

Quarter	1	2	3	4	Total
Tar Heels	0	14	14	7	35
Seminoles	3	0	8	0	11

at Doak Campbell Stadium • Tallahassee, FL

- Date: Saturday, November 2, 2024
- Game time: 3:30 p.m.
- Game attendance: 55,107
- Referee: Mike Roche
- TV announcers (ACCN): Chris Cotter (play-by-play), Mark Herzlich (analyst) and Coley Harvey (sideline)

Game information

First quarter

- 9:33, FSU – Ryan Fitzgerald 56-yard field goal (Drive: 6 plays, 36 yards, 2:13; Florida State 3-0)

Second quarter

- 13:45, UNC – Omarion Hampton 1-yard run (Noah Burnette kick) (Drive: 9 plays, 54 yards, 4:26; North Carolina 7-3)
- 1:57, UNC – Omarion Hampton 2-yard run (Noah Burnette kick) (Drive: 16 plays, 93 yards, 8:11; North Carolina 14-3)

Third quarter

- 11:48, UNC – Omarion Hampton 31-yard run (Noah Burnette kick) (Drive: 6 plays, 75 yards, 3:12; North Carolina 21-3)
- 6:24, FSU – Ja'Khi Douglas 28-yard pass from Brock Glenn (Lawayne McCoy run for two-point conversion) (Drive: 5 plays, 85 yards, 2:11; North Carolina 21-11)
- 2:50, UNC – Omarion Hampton 1-yard run (Noah Burnette kick (Drive: 7 plays, 75 yards, 3:34; North Carolina 28-11)

Fourth quarter

- 12:19, UNC – Omarion Hampton 49-yard pass from Jacolby Criswell (Noah Burnette kick) (Drive: 3 plays, 49 yards, 1:38; North Carolina 35-11)

Statistics	UNC	FSU
First downs	23	10
Total yards	500	201
Rushing yards	289	42
Passing yards	211	159
Passing: Comp–Att–Int	13–17–0	8–18–2
Time of possession	39:43	20:17

Team	Category	Player	Statistics
North Carolina	Passing	Jacolby Criswell	13/17, 211 yards, TD
North Carolina	Rushing	Omarion Hampton	32 carries, 172 yards, TD
North Carolina	Receiving	Omarion Hampton	3 receptions, 93 yards, TD
Florida State	Passing	Brock Glenn	6/11, 123 yards, TD
Florida State	Rushing	Lawrence Toafili	8 carries, 24 yards
Florida State	Receiving	Malik Benson	1 reception, 50 yards

=== at No. 10 Notre Dame ===
Game Ten – Florida State Seminoles (1–8) at No. 10 Notre Dame Fighting Irish (7–1) – Game summary

Quarter	1	2	3	4	Total
Seminoles	3	0	0	0	3
No. 10 Fighting Irish	7	14	10	21	52

at Notre Dame Stadium • Notre Dame, IN

- Date: Saturday, November 9, 2024
- Game time: 7:30 p.m.
- Game weather: Temperature: 53 °F (12 °C) • Wind: SE 10 MPH • Weather: Cloudy
- Game attendance: 77,622
- Referee: Adam Savoie
- TV announcers (NBC): Noah Eagle (play-by-play), Todd Blackledge (analyst) and Kathryn Tappen (sideline)

Game information

First quarter

- 13:17, ND – Riley Leonard 34-yard run (Mitch Jeter kick) (Drive: 5 plays, 75 yards, 1:43; Notre Dame 7-0)
- 5:22, FSU – Ryan Fitzgerald 23-yard field goal (Drive: 16 plays, 75 yards, 7:52; Notre Dame 7-3)

Second quarter

- 14:35, ND – Jadarian Price 65-yard run (Mitch Jeter kick) (Drive: 3 plays, 84 yards, 1:05; Notre Dame 14-3)
- 0:17, ND – Mitchell Evans 12-yard pass from Riley Leonard (Mitch Jeter kick) (Drive: 12 plays, 77 yards, 1:31; Notre Dame 21-3)

Third quarter

- 9:38, ND – Riley Leonard 6-yard run (Mitch Jeter kick) (Drive: 6 plays, 38 yards, 2:55; Notre Dame 28-3)
- 1:05, ND – Mitch Jeter 28-yard field goal (Drive: 6 plays, 50 yards, 2:51; Notre Dame 31-3)

Fourth quarter

- 10:53, ND – Jeremiyah Love 1-yard run (Mitch Jeter kick) (Drive: 7 plays, 65 yards, 3:51; Notre Dame 38-3)
- 4:06, ND – Deion Colzie 7-yard pass from Steve Angeli (Mitch Jeter kick) (Drive: 8 plays, 57 yards, 4:20; Notre Dame 45-3)
- 1:23, ND – Luke Talich 79-yard interception return (Mitch Jeter kick) (Notre Dame 52-3)

Statistics	FSU	ND
First downs	14	22
Total yards	208	453
Rushing yards	120	201
Passing yards	88	252
Passing: Comp–Att–Int	10–26–2	17–30–0
Time of possession	33:11	26:49

Team	Category	Player	Statistics
Florida State	Passing	Brock Glenn	5/18, 51 yards, 2 INT
Florida State	Rushing	Lawrence Toafili	16 carries, 77 yards
Florida State	Receiving	Lawayne McCoy	2 receptions, 22 yards
Notre Dame	Passing	Riley Leonard	14/27, 215 yards, TD
Notre Dame	Rushing	Jadarian Price	7 carries, 95 yards, TD
Notre Dame	Receiving	Jaden Greathouse	5 receptions, 66 yards

=== vs. Charleston Southern (FCS) ===
Game Eleven – Charleston Southern Buccaneers (FCS) (1–10) vs Florida State Seminoles (1–9) – Game summary

Quarter	1	2	3	4	Total
Buccaneers (FCS)	0	0	0	7	7
Seminoles	0	17	14	10	41

at Doak Campbell Stadium • Tallahassee, FL

- Date: Saturday, November 23, 2024
- Game time: 1:30 p.m.
- Game attendance: 43,711
- Referee: Stuart Mullins
- TV announcers (ACCNX): Shawn Kenney (play-by-play) and Forrest Conoly (analyst)

Game information

First quarter

- No scoring

Second quarter

- 13:42, FSU – Ryan Fitzgerald 25-yard field goal (Drive: 7 plays, 46 yards, 3:08; Florida State 3-0)
- 4:05, FSU – Luke Kromenhoek 4-yard pass to Amaree Williams (Ryan Fitzgerald kick) (Drive: 6 plays, 24 yards, 2:44; Florida State 10-0)
- 0:26, FSU – Caziah Holmes 3-yard run (Ryan Fitzgerald kick) (Drive: 8 plays, 67 yards, 1:48; Florida State 17-0)

Third quarter

- 14:42, FSU – Luke Kromenhoek 71-yard pass to Ja'Khi Douglas (Ryan Fitzgerald kick) (Drive: 1 play, 71 yards, 0:13; Florida State 24-0)
- 7:47, FSU – Luke Kromenhoek 10-yard pass to Hykeem Williams (Ryan Fitzgerald kick) (Drive: 7 plays, 80 yards, 4:06; Florida State 31-0)

Fourth quarter

- 14:55, FSU – Jake Weinberg 23-yard field goal (Drive: 7 plays, 12 yards, 3:25; Florida State 34-0)
- 5:24, FSU – Caziah Holmes 18-yard run (Ryan Fitzgerald kick) (Drive: 7 plays, 76 yards, 3:27; Florida State 41-0)
- 0:57, CSU – Kaleb Jackson 7-yard pass to Landon Sauers (Reid Montgomery kick) (Drive: 12 plays, 75 yards, 4:27; Florida State 41-7)

Statistics	CSU	FSU
First downs	18	20
Total yards	275	415
Rushing yards	57	175
Passing yards	218	240
Passing: Comp–Att–Int	22–32–1	16–23–0
Time of possession	33:05	26:55

Team	Category	Player	Statistics
Charleston Southern	Passing	Kaleb Jackson	22/32, 218 yards, 1 TD, 1 INT
Charleston Southern	Rushing	Autavius Ison	13 carries, 28 yards
Charleston Southern	Receiving	Chris Rhone	3 receptions, 60 yards
Florida State	Passing	Luke Kromenhoek	13/20, 209 yards, 3 TD
Florida State	Rushing	Kam Davis	9 carries, 39 yards
Florida State	Receiving	Ja'Khi Douglas	3 receptions, 82 yards, 1 TD

=== vs. Florida ===
Game Twelve – Florida Gators (6–5) vs Florida State Seminoles (2–9) – Game summary

Quarter	1	2	3	4	Total
Gators	7	7	3	14	31
Seminoles	0	0	3	8	11

at Doak Campbell Stadium • Tallahassee, FL

- Date: Saturday, November 30, 2024
- Game time: 7:00 p.m.
- Game attendance: 55,107
- Referee: Steve Marlowe
- TV announcers (ESPN2): Jay Alter (play-by-play), Rocky Boiman (analyst) and Ashley Stroehlein (sideline reporter)

Game information

First quarter

- 2:28, UF – Ja'Kobi Jackson 1-yard run (Trey Smack kick) (Drive: 2 plays, 14 yards, 0:26; Florida 7-0)

Second quarter

- 0:25, UF – Marcus Burke 4-yard pass from DJ Lagway (Trey Smack kick) (Drive: 9 plays, 80 yards, 2:31; Florida 14-0)

Third quarter

- 9:47, FSU – Ryan Fitzgerald 39-yard field goal (Drive: 9 plays, 42 yards, 3:01; Florida 14-3)
- 6:27, UF – Trey Smack 30-yard field goal (Drive: 4 plays, 0 yards, 1:22; Florida 17-3)

Fourth quarter

- 12:38, UF – Montrell Johnson Jr. 65-yard run (Trey Smack kick) (Drive: 6 plays, 93 yards, 2:46; Florida 24-3)
- 3:18, FSU – Lawrance Toafili 2-yd run (Luke Kromenhoek pass to Landen Thomas for two-point conversion) (Drive: 11 plays, 59 yards, 4:01; Florida 24-11)
- 2:03, UF – Tony Livingston 8-yard pass from DJ Lagway (Trey Smack kick) (Drive: 5 plays, 51 yards, 1:14; Florida 31-11)

Statistics	UF	FSU
First downs	18	20
Total yards	368	239
Rushing yards	235	99
Passing yards	133	140
Passing: Comp–Att–Int	14–22–1	15–28–0
Time of possession	27:08	32:52

Team	Category	Player	Statistics
Florida	Passing	DJ Lagway	14/22, 133 yards, 2 TD, 1 INT
Florida	Rushing	Montrell Johnson Jr.	10 carries, 99 yards, 1 TD
Florida	Receiving	Chimere Dike	3 receptions, 63 yards
Florida State	Passing	Luke Kromenhoek	15/28, 140 yards
Florida State	Rushing	Lawrance Toafili	9 carries, 43 yards, 1 TD
Florida State	Receiving	Lawrance Toafili	3 receptions, 39 yards

== Personnel ==
=== Roster ===
2024 Florida State Seminoles Football
Legend: (C) Team captain; (S) Suspended; (I) Ineligible; Injured; Redshirt
Quarterbacks: 4 – DJ Uiagalelei – Graduate Student (6'4, 252); 10 - Trever Jackson - Freshman (6'3,187); 11 – Brock Glenn – Sophomore (6'2, 215); 12 – Michael Grant – Freshman (6'3, 201); 16 – Dylan McNamara – Freshman (6'2, 218); 14 – Luke Kromenhoek – Freshman (6'4, 208); Running backs: 24 – Roydell Williams – Graduate Student (5'10, 214); 9 – Lawrance Toafili – Senior (5'11, 196); 13 – Jaylin Lucas – Junior (5'9, 175); 26 – Caziah Holmes – Senior (5'11, 215); 28 – Samuel Singleton Jr. – Sophomore (5'11, 195); 33 – Demetric Stephens – Freshman (5'11, 205); 3 – Kameron Davis – Freshman (5'10, 224); 19 – Micahi Danzy – Freshman (6'1, 185); Wide receivers: 0 – Ja'Khi Douglas – Junior (5'9, 195); 5 – Deuce Spann – Senior (6'4, 208); 7 – Destyn Hill (injured) – Sophomore (6'0, 194); 8 – Hykeem Williams – Sophomore (6'2, 215); 10 – Malik Benson – Junior (6'1, 195); 6 – Jalen Brown – Freshman (6'1, 174); 21 – Darion Willliamson – Senior (6'3, 204); 31 – Solomon Lowery Jr. – Freshman (6'3, 192); 32 – Jeremiah Gierdys – Junior (6'1, 201); 82 – Carson Pielock – Freshman (6'1, 192); 83 – Zamari McKenley – Freshman (5'10, 167); 87 – Xavier Johnson – Junior (6'2, 197); 1 – Kentron Poitier – Senior (6'3, 202); 80 – B.J. Gibson – Freshman (6'0, 193); 88 – Camdon Frier – Freshman (6'0, 192); 15 – LaWayne McCoy – Freshman (6'1, 176); 81 – Elijah Moore – Freshman (6'4, 204); Tight ends: 45 – Jackson West – Junior (6'4, 244); 84 – Kyle Morlock – Senior (6'6, 240); 86 – Brian Courtney – Junior (6'3, 238); 89 – Jerrale Powers – Freshman (6'4, 236); 18 – Landen Thomas – Freshman (6'4, 225); 40 - Amaree Williams - Freshman (6'4, 219); Kicker/Punter: 29 – Alex Mastromanno – Senior (6'1, 235) (P); 43 – Mac Chiumento – Sophomore (6'4, 29) (P); 88 – Ryan Fitzgerald – Senior (6'1, 198) (K); 99 – Max Larson – Junior (6'0, 196) (K); 32 – Jake Weinberg – Freshman (5'11, 170) (K); Long snappers: 60 – Peyton Naylor – Freshman (5'10, 191); 32 – Mason Arnold – Junior (6'0, 215)	Offensive Lineman: 52 – Robert Scott Jr. – Junior (6'5, 337); 53 – Maurice Smith – Junior (6'3, 298); 54 – Jaylen Early – Freshman (6'4, 297); 63 – Jeremiah Byers – Senior (6'4, 325); 64 – David Stickle – Senior (6'3, 285); 65 – Andre Otto – Freshman (6'5, 326); 66 – Ben Ostaszweski – Junior (6'3, 291); 68 – LaNard Toney – Freshman (6'0, 306); 72 – Julian Armella – Freshman (6'6, 320); 75 – Keiondre James – Senior (6'3, 332); 76 – Darius Washington – Senior (6'4, 306); 77 – Bryson Estes – Junior (6'3, 300); 79 – Lucas Simmons – Freshman (6'8, 308); 74 – Jonathan Daniels – Freshman (6'4, 291); 70 – Manasse Itete – Freshman (6'6, 275); 78 – Jayden Todd – Freshman (6'6, 310); 56 – Tye Hylton – Freshman (6'5, 292); 69 – Terrance Ferguson II – Junior (6'4, 330); 67 – Richie Leonard IV – Senior (6'2, 310); 64 - Jacob Rizy - Senior (6'5, 308); Defensive Lineman: 19 – Tomiwa Durojaiye – R Sophomore (6'4, 280); 7 – Marvin Jones Jr. – Junior (6'5, 255); 13 – Sione Lolohea – Senior (6'5, 266); 11 – Patrick Payton – Junior (6'5, 250); 6 – Darrell Jackson Jr. – Senior (6'5, 330); 44 – Jaden Jones – Junior (6'5, 252); 5 – Joshua Farmer – Junior (6'3, 318); 45 – Lamont Green Jr. – Sophomore (6'3, 223); 54 – Byron Turner Jr. – Junior (6'4, 251); 56 – Keith Sampson – Junior (6'3, 306); 57 – Aaron Hester – Sophomore (6'2, 244); 89 – Xavier Perkins – Freshman (6'4, 245); 90 – Grady Kelly – Junior (6'2, 295); 92 – Liam McCormick – Junior (6'3, 283); 93 – Malakai Menzer – Senior (6'1, 247); 94 – George Sklavenitis – Freshman (6'2, 242); 95 – Daniel Lyons – Sophomore (6'4, 294); 96 – Dante Anderson – Sophomore (6'3, 240); 92 – D'Nas White – Freshman (6'4, 336); 52 – D.D. Holmes – Freshman (6'6, 255); 99 – Jamorie Flagg – Freshman (6'3, 316)	Linebackers: 10 – DJ Lundy – Senior (6'1, 244); 20 – Blake Nichelson – Sophomore (6'3, 215); 28 – Justin Cryer – Sophomore (6'1, 232); 31 – DeMarco Ward – Sophomore (6'1, 216); 9 – Omar Graham Jr. – Sophomore (6'1, 225); 41 – A.J. Cottrill – Sophomore (6'0, 222); 15 – Shawn Murphy – Sophomore (6'2, 230); 46 – Ashton Bracewell – Freshman (6'3, 227); 53 – Brandon Torres – Freshman (6'1, 225); 55 – Jayden Parrish – Freshman (6'1, 225); 51 – Timir Hickman-Collins – Freshman (6'0, 220); 18 - Cam Riley - Senior (6'5,237); Defensive backs: 3 – Kevin Knowles II – Senior (5'11, 190); 22 – Davonte Brown – Senior (6'2, 195); 12 – Conrad Hussey – Sophomore (6'0, 200); 33 – Edwin Joseph – Sophomore (6'0, 190); 16 – Quindarrius Jones – Sophomore (6'2, 190); 8 – Azareye'h Thomas – Junior (6'2, 198); 21 - Omarion Cooper - Senior (6'0,202); 23 – Fentrell Cypress – Senior (6'0, 188); 24 – K.J. Kirkland – Freshman (6'1, 206); 26 – Dwayne Walls Jr. – Graduate Student (6'1, 201); 27 – Ashlynd Barker – Sophomore (6'3, 212); 30 – Ja'Bril Rawls – Sophomore (6'1, 176); 32 – Peter Warrick Jr. – Junior (5'10, 170); 37 – Christian White – Freshman (5'11, 177); 1 – Shyheim Brown – Junior (6'2, 208); 42 – Harold Stubbs IV – Freshman (5'11, 173); 47 – Donny Hiebert – Sophomore (6'2, 196); 48 – Jayden Bradford – Freshman (6'0, 172); 14 – Cai Bates – Freshman (6'2, 190); 4 – Charles Lester III – Freshman (6'2, 190); 0 – Earl Little II – Sophomore (6'1, 186); 18 – Jamari Howard – Freshman (6'2, 180); 26 – Ricky Knight III – Freshman (6'1, 175)
Source and player details, 2024 Florida State Seminoles Football Commits (10/5/2024):

==== Transfers ====
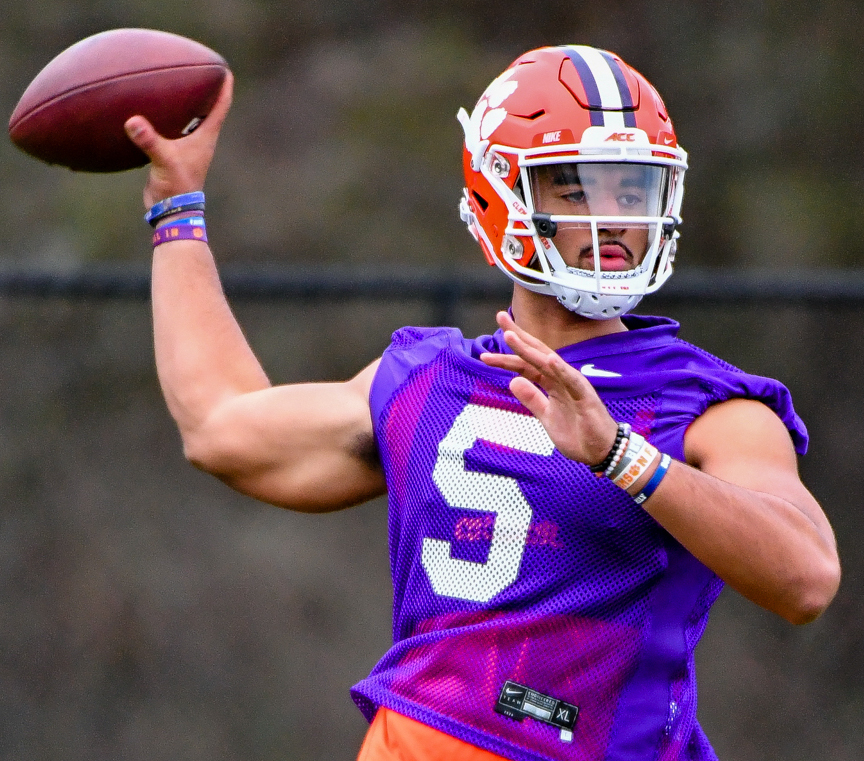
Transfer quarterback DJ Uiagalelei previously played for conference foe Clemson.

Twenty Florida State players elected to enter the NCAA Transfer Portal during or after the 2023 season. Over the off-season, Florida State added fourteen players from the transfer portal. According to 247 Sports, Florida State had the No. 4 ranked transfer class in the country. Florida State received notable transfers from Marvin Jones Jr., son of alumnus Marvin Jones, and DJ Uiagalelei.

Departing transfers
Name	No.	Pos.	Height/Weight	Class	Hometown	New school	Sources
Winston Wright Jr.	#1	RB	5'10, 188	Redshirt Senior	Savannah, GA	East Carolina	
Dennis Briggs Jr.	#6	DL	6'4, 290	Redshirt Senior	Kissimmee, FL	Illinois	
Tate Rodemaker	#18	QB	6'4, 196	Redshirt Junior	Valdosta, GA	Southern Miss	
Gilber Edmond	#19	DL	6'4, 257	Redshirt Junior	Fort Pierce, FL	South Carolina	
Vandrevius Jacobs	#19	WR	6'0, 175	Freshman	Fort Pierce, FL	South Carolina	
Greedy Vance Jr.	#21	DB	5'11, 170	Redshirt Junior	Kenner, LA	USC	
Goldie Lawrence	#80	WR	6'0, 193	Freshman	Sanford, FL	UCF	
Malcolm Ray	#99	DL	6'2, 292	Redshirt Junior	Miami Gardens, FL	Rutgers	

Incoming transfers
Name	No.	Pos.	Height/Weight	Year	Hometown	Transfer from	Sources
Tomiwa Durojaiye	#3	DL	6'4, 278	Redshirt Freshman	Philadelphia, PA	West Virginia	
DJ Uiagalelei	#5	QB	6"5, 245	Junior	Bellflower, California	Oregon State	
Roydell Williams	#5	RB	5'10, 214	Senior	Hueytown, AL	Alabama	
Davonte Brown	#7	CB	6"2, 185	Junior	Fort Lauderdale, FL	Miami	
Marvin Jones Jr.	#7	OLB	6'5, 250	Sophomore	Sunrise, FL	Georgia Bulldogs	
Sione Lolohea	#8	DL	6"5, 266	Junior	Houma, Tongatapu, Tonga	Oregon State	
Malik Benson	#11	WR	6'1, 195	Junior	Lansing, KS	Alabama	
Jaylin Lucas	#12	RB/RS	5'9, 175	Sophomore	Houma, LA	Indiana	
Jalen Brown	#14	WR	6"1, 178	Freshman	Miami, FL	LSU	
Earl Little II	#20	CB	6'1, 186	Redshirt Freshman	Fort Lauderdale, FL	Alabama	
Shawn Murphy	#43	LB	6'2, 225	Redshirt Freshman	Manassas, VA	Alabama	
Jacob Rizy	#64	OL	6"5, 305	Senior	Wesport, CT	Harvard	
Richie Leonard	#67	OL	6"2, 310	Junior	Coca, FL	Florida	
Terrance Ferguson II	#69	OL	6'4, 290	Redshirt Sophomore	Fort Valley, GA	Alabama	
Grady Kelly	#90	DL	6"2, 285	Redshirt Sophomore	Navarre, FL	Colorado State	

=== Coaching staff ===
Florida State Seminoles coaches

Head coach

- Mike Norvell

Assistant coaches

- Alex Atkins – Offensive coordinator/offensive line (until week 10)
- Adam Fuller – Defensive coordinator (until week 10)
- Randy Shannon – Co-defensive coordinator/linebackers
- John Papuchis – Special teams/defensive ends
- Chris Thomsen – Deputy head coach/tight ends
- Odell Haggins – Associate head coach/defensive tackles
- Tony Tokarz – Quarterbacks
- Ron Dugans – Wide receivers (until week 10)
- David Johnson – Running backs/recruiting coordinator
- Patrick Surtain – Defensive backs
- Josh Storms – Strength and conditioning
- Rick Stockstill - Offensive analyst
- Ernie Sims - Defensive analyst
Reference: 2024 Florida State Seminoles Football Media Guide

== Awards ==
=== Watchlists ===
Award	Player
Preseason All-American	Alex Mastromanno
Preseason All-ACC	Alex Mastromanno; Joshua Farmer; Darius Washington; Maurice Smith
Midseason All-American	Alex Mastromanno
Dodd Trophy	Mike Norvell
Maxwell Award	DJ Uiagalelei
Bronko Nagurski Trophy	Joshua Farmer
Outland Trophy	Joshua Farmer; Darius Washington
Jim Thorpe Award	Shyheim Brown
Lou Groza Award	Ryan Fitzgerald
Ray Guy Award	Alex Mastromanno
Walter Camp Award	DJ Uiagalelei
Davey O'Brien Award	DJ Uiagalelei
Rimington Trophy	Maurice Smith
Mackey Award	Kyle Morlock
Bednarik Award	Joshua Farmer; Patrick Payton
Lombardi Award	Patrick Payton; Darius Washington
Johnny Unitas Award	DJ Uiagalelei
Polynesian College Football Player of the Year	DJ Uiagalelei; Lawrance Toafili; Sione Lolohea
Wuerffel Trophy	Maurice Smith
Witten Award	Kevin Knowles II

=== Honors ===
Weekly Honors
Player	Award	Ref.
Shyheim Brown	ACC Defensive Back of the Week (Week Zero)	
Ryan Fitzgerald	ACC Specialist of the Week (Week Zero)	
Alex Mastromanno	Ray Guy Punter of the Week (Week One)	
Patrick Payton	ACC Defensive Lineman of the Week (Week Four)	
Samuel Singleton Jr.	ACC Specialist of the Week (Week Eight)	

Yearly Honors
Player	Award	Ref.
Robert Scott Jr.	Campbell Trophy semifinalist	
Alex Mastromanno	Walter Camp All-American First Team; AFCA All-American First Team; Associated Press All-American First Team; FWAA All-American First Team; Sporting News All-American Second Team; All-ACC First Team; Ray Guy Award finalist	
Ryan Fitzgerald	AFCA All-American First Team; Associated Press All-American Third Team; All-ACC Second Team; Lou Groza Award finalist	
Samuel Singleton Jr.	FWAA Freshman All-American	
Darrell Jackson Jr.	All-ACC Honorable Mention	
Azareye'h Thomas	All-ACC Honorable Mention	
Joshua Farmer	All-ACC Honorable Mention	

== Players drafted into the NFL ==
Following the season, two players went on to be drafted into the NFL.

Round	Pick	Player	Position	NFL Club
3	73	Azareye'h Thomas	DB	New York Jets
4	137	Joshua Farmer	DL	New England Patriots
