= Ron Dugans =

American football player and coach (born 1977)

Florida A&M Rattlers
- Title: Wide receivers coach

Personal information
- Born: April 27, 1977 (age 49); Tallahassee, Florida, U.S.
- Listed height: 6 ft 2 in (1.88 m)
- Listed weight: 205 lb (93 kg)

Career information
- High school: Tallahassee (FL) Florida A&M
- College: Florida State
- NFL draft: 2000: 3rd round, 66th overall pick

Career history

Playing
- Cincinnati Bengals (2000–2002); Houston Texans (2004)*
- * Offseason or practice squad member only

Coaching
- Florida State (2005–2006) Graduate assistant; Cincinnati Bengals (2007) Assistant special teams coordinator; Georgia Southern (2008–2009) Wide receivers coach; Louisville (2010–2013) Wide receivers coach; South Florida (2014–2015) Wide receivers coach; Miami (FL) (2016–2017) Wide receivers coach; Miami (FL) (2018) Co-offensive coordinator & wide receivers coach; Florida State (2019–2024) Wide receivers coach; Florida A&M (2026–present) Wide receivers coach

Awards and highlights
- BCS national champion (1999)

Career NFL statistics
- Receptions: 89
- Receiving yards: 797
- Touchdowns: 3
- Stats at Pro Football Reference

Ron Dugans (born April 27, 1977) is an American football coach and former player. He is the former wide receivers coach for Florida State University, a position he had held since 2019. He played professionally as a wide receiver for four seasons with the Cincinnati Bengals of the National Football League (NFL).

== Playing career ==
Dugans was a standout receiver at Florida State where he won a BCS Championship in 1999 season in his final season. Dugans caught five passes for 99 yards and two touchdowns in the 2000 BCS Championship Game.

Pre-draft measurables
Height	Weight	Arm length	Hand span	40-yard dash	Broad jump
6 ft 1 3/8 in (1.86 m)	206 lb (93 kg)	31 1/2 in (0.80 m)	10 in (0.25 m)	4.58 s	9 ft 9 in (2.97 m)
All values from NFL Combine

Dugans was selected in the third round of the 2000 NFL draft by the Bengals. He signed a deal with the Houston Texans but never played with the team.

== NFL career statistics ==
Legend
**Bold**	Career high

Year	Team	Games		Receiving					
Year	Team	GP	GS	Tgt	Rec	Yds	Avg	Lng	TD
2000	CIN	14	**5**	38	14	125	8.9	17	1
2001	CIN	**16**	3	45	28	251	**9.0**	**31**	**2**
2002	CIN	**16**	**5**	**73**	**47**	**421**	**9.0**	**31**	0
		46	13	156	89	797	9.0	31	3

== Coaching career ==
Prior to joining the Georgia Southern Eagles' staff under head coach Chris Hatcher, Dugans spent the 2005 and 2006 seasons with Florida State as a graduate assistant, working with the wide receivers and the strength and conditioning program. In 2010, he was hired by Charlie Strong to become wide receivers coach at the University of Louisville. In 2014, after four years at Louisville and Strong's departure to The University of Texas, Dugans returned home to Florida to become wide receivers coach for the University of South Florida. In 2016, Dugans joined Mark Richt's staff at the University of Miami and was co-offensive coordinator and wide receivers coach. In January 2019, Dugans was released by new Hurricanes coach Manny Diaz and hired as the wide receivers coach by Willie Taggart at his alma mater, Florida State.

New head coach Mike Norvell retained Dugans on his staff. Florida State fired Dugans, along with offensive coordinator Alex Atkins and defensive coordinator Adam Fuller, on November 10, 2024, amid a disappointing 1–9 season.

== Personal life ==
On September 5, 2008, a crash involving Dugans' daughter's school bus killed his daughter Ronshay, aged 8. There is now a national Don't Drive Drowsy Week (the first week of September) in memory of her death.
