= Alex Atkins =

American football coach

Current position
- Title: Tight Ends coach
- Team: Missouri
- Conference: SEC

Biographical details
- Born: Chicago, Illinois, U.S.
- Education: University of Tennessee at Martin (2007)

Playing career
- 2003–2006: Tennessee–Martin
- Position: Guard

Coaching career (HC unless noted)
- 2007: Tennessee–Martin (GA)
- 2008: Tennessee–Martin (TE)
- 2009: Marshall (GA)
- 2010–2011: Itawamba (OL/RC)
- 2012–2013: Chattanooga (OL)
- 2014–2015: Georgia Southern (OL)
- 2016–2017: Tulane (AHC/OL)
- 2018: Tulane (AHC/RGC/OL)
- 2019: Charlotte (OC/OL)
- 2020–2021: Florida State (OL)
- 2022–2024: Florida State (OC/OL)
- 2025: LSU (Interim OC/RGC/TE)
- 2026-present: Missouri (TE)

Alex Atkins is an American college football coach.

== Playing career ==
Atkins was a four-year starter on the offensive line at guard for UT-Martin. He received all-conference honors twice.

== Coaching career ==
=== Early coaching career ===
Atkins began his coaching career at his alma mater, UT-Martin in 2007 working as a graduate assistant. In 2008, he was promoted and given a position and began coaching the tight ends. In 2009, he served as a graduate assistant for Marshall. In 2010, he joined Itawamba Community College in Mississippi as the team's offensive line coach and recruiting coordinator. In 2012 and 2013, he worked as the offensive line coach for Chattanooga. Atkins arrived at Georgia Southern in 2014 once again working with the offensive line. He left after the 2015 season.

=== Tulane ===
In 2016, Atkins went to Tulane as the assistant head coach and offensive line coach. In 2018, he was given the additional title of run game coordinator.

=== Charlotte ===
In 2019, Atkins served as the offensive coordinator and offensive line coach for the Charlotte 49ers.

=== Florida State ===
In 2020, Atkins joined Florida State as the team's offensive line coach. In 2022, he was named the team's offensive coordinator. Florida State fired Atkins, along with defensive coordinator Adam Fuller and wide receivers coach Ron Dugans, on November 10, 2024, amid a disappointing 1–9 season.
