= 2000 Sugar Bowl =

College football bowl game and BCS National Championship

2000 Nokia Sugar Bowl
- BCS National Championship Game; 66th Sugar Bowl
Virginia Tech Hokies	Florida State Seminoles
(11–0)	(11–0)
Big East	ACC
29	46
Head coach: Frank Beamer	Head coach: Bobby Bowden
AP / Coaches / BCS; 2 / 2 / 2	AP / Coaches / BCS; 1 / 1 / 1
	1	2	3	4	Total
Virginia Tech	7	7	15	0	29
Florida State	14	14	0	18	46
- Date: January 4, 2000
- Season: 1999
- Stadium: Louisiana Superdome
- Location: New Orleans, Louisiana, US
- MVP: Peter Warrick (Florida State)
- Favorite: Florida State by 6 points (49.5)
- National anthem: The Zion Harmonizers
- Referee: Steve Shaw (SEC)
- Halftime show: Various high school bands, Bowl Games of America
- Attendance: 79,280

United States TV coverage
- Network: ABC
- Announcers: Brent Musburger (Play by Play); Gary Danielson (Analyst); Lynn Swann (Sideline); Jack Arute (Sideline)
- Nielsen ratings: 17.5

The 2000 Sugar Bowl was the designated Bowl Championship Series (BCS) National Championship Game for the 1999 NCAA Division I-A football season and was played on January 4, 2000, at the Louisiana Superdome in New Orleans, Louisiana, United States. The Florida State Seminoles, representing the Atlantic Coast Conference, defeated the Virginia Tech Hokies, representing the Big East Conference, by a score of 46–29. With the win, Florida State clinched the 1999 BCS national championship, the team's second national championship in its history.

An estimated total of 79,280 people attended the game in person, while approximately 18.4 million US viewers watched the game on ABC television. The resulting 17.5 television rating was the third-largest ever recorded for a BCS college football game. Tickets were in high demand for the game, with tens of thousands of fans from both teams attending, many using scalped tickets to gain entry.

The game kicked off at 8:00 p.m. EST, and Virginia Tech received the ball to begin the game. Though Tech advanced down the field, Florida State scored first and took advantage of a blocked punt for a touchdown, giving the Seminoles a 14–0 lead in the first quarter. Tech answered with a touchdown drive of its own before the end of the quarter, but Florida State scored two quick touchdowns to begin the second quarter. Virginia Tech scored a touchdown before halftime, but halfway through the game, Florida State held a 28–14 lead. In the third quarter, Virginia Tech's offense gave the Hokies a lead with a field goal and two touchdowns. Tech failed to convert two two-point conversions, but held a 29–28 lead at the end of the third quarter. Florida State answered in the fourth quarter, however, taking a 36–29 lead with a touchdown and successful two-point conversion early in the quarter. From this point, the Seminoles did not relinquish the lead, extending it to 46–29 with another touchdown and a field goal.

For his performance in the game, Florida State wide receiver Peter Warrick was named the game's most valuable player. Although Tech lost the game, several of its players won postseason awards—most notably Michael Vick, who earned an ESPY for his performance during the Sugar Bowl and the regular season. Several players from each team entered the National Football League after graduation, being selected either in the 2000 NFL draft or later editions of that selection process.

== Team selection ==
By contract, the top two teams in the BCS Poll at the conclusion of the regular season were invited to the BCS national championship game. In 2000, the BCS Poll was a combination of four different systems: media and coaches' polls (Associated Press college football poll and USA Today Coaches' Poll), team records, a collection of eight different computer ranking systems, and a strength-of-schedule component based on opponent records. Under the BCS, the site of the national championship game rotated every year. In 2000, there were four BCS bowl games: the Rose Bowl, the Sugar Bowl, the Orange Bowl, and the Fiesta Bowl. The national championship game rotated to a different location each year, and the other three games served as bowl games for lower-ranked teams. Later, in 2007, the BCS National Championship was created, adding a fifth BCS bowl. In 2000, the Sugar Bowl was scheduled to host the national championship game.

=== Florida State ===
The Florida State Seminoles ended the 1998 college football season with a 23–16 loss to the Tennessee Volunteers in the 1999 Fiesta Bowl, which was the national championship game that year. The loss was only the second of the season for Florida State, which had entered the game ranked No. 2 and favored against the No. 1 ranked Volunteers. Florida State players and coaches entered the off-season hoping to improve upon their runner-up finish in the national championship game the year before, and were voted the No. 1 team in the country in the annual Associated Press preseason poll.

Florida State lived up to its No. 1 ranking in its first game of the 1999 college football season, routing unranked Louisiana Tech, 41–7. The following week, in their ACC opener, the Seminoles had a closer contest against Georgia Tech, but still earned a 41–35 victory. As the weeks went by, the wins continued to accumulate. FSU defeated North Carolina State, 42–11; North Carolina, 42–10; and Duke, 51–23. In the seventh week of the college football season, the Seminoles faced off against a traditional rival: the Miami Hurricanes. Heading into the game, the Seminoles were without star wide receiver and potential Heisman Trophy candidate Peter Warrick, who was suspended from the team after being arrested for participating in a scheme to underpay for clothes at a Tallahassee, Florida clothing store. Despite the loss of Warrick, Florida State eked out a 31–21 victory over the Hurricanes after being tied, 21–21, at halftime.

The week after the Miami game, the Seminoles had an even closer call against the Clemson Tigers—their closest, in fact, of the entire season. Despite the return of Peter Warrick, who was cleared of charges in a Florida courtroom, Florida State fell behind the Tigers in the first half. Trailing in Clemson, South Carolina, 14–3 at halftime, Florida State cut the gap to 14–6 with a field goal midway through the third quarter, then tied the game at the end of the third quarter with a touchdown and two-point conversion. The Seminoles clinched the victory after a field goal late in the fourth quarter gave them a 17–14 lead and cemented the victory when a Clemson attempt to even the score with a field goal fell short. The victory was FSU head coach Bobby Bowden's 300th win and came against his son, Tommy Bowden, coach of the Tigers.

Florida State earned easy wins with a 35–10 victory over Virginia and a 49–10 win over Maryland before facing the rival Florida Gators in the final game of the Seminoles' regular season. Florida State led throughout the game, but had to fend off a last-minute Florida drive in order to clinch a 30–23 win and just the third perfect regular season in Florida State history. This season later was termed the "Wire to Wire" season as the Seminoles kept their No. 1 ranking the entire season.

=== Virginia Tech ===
Like Florida State, the Virginia Tech Hokies began the 1999 college football season with raised expectations. In 1998, the Hokies had gone 9–3 during the regular season and had posted a 5–2 record against fellow Big East Conference teams. The Hokies concluded that 1998 season—which was supposed to be a rebuilding year—in the 1998 Music City Bowl, where the Hokies defeated the Alabama Crimson Tide, 38–7. With the addition of redshirt freshman quarterback Michael Vick to a team that had allowed an average of just 12.9 points per game on defense, there was the possibility that Tech could improve upon its previous season's performance. Sports Illustrated, for example, predicted that the Hokies might challenge Miami for the Big East football championship, and the preseason Coaches' Poll ranked the Hokies No. 14 prior to the first game of the season.

In their first game of the season, the Hokies lived up to expectations, shutting out James Madison University, 47–0. The game was the first time Tech had shut out an opponent in a season opener since 1953. The game was marred, however, by a leg injury to Michael Vick that caused him to leave the game. The following week, against the University of Alabama Birmingham, Vick did not play. Despite his absence, the Hokies still managed a 31–10 win. This was followed by a 31–11 Thursday-night victory over Clemson in Virginia Tech's first game against a Division I-A opponent during the season.

Following the win over Clemson, Tech faced traditional rival Virginia in the annual battle for the Commonwealth Cup. Despite the rivalry and the fact that Virginia was ranked the No. 24 team in the country, the Cavaliers put up even less of a struggle than Clemson. Virginia Tech won, 31–7. Now No. 5 in the country, Tech began to distance itself from other highly ranked teams with consecutive wins over Rutgers and Syracuse. The 62–0 shutout of No. 16 Syracuse was the largest victory ever recorded against a team ranked in the AP Poll. By this time, the Hokies were being described in media reports as a national championship contender.

Following a 30–17 victory at Pittsburgh, Virginia Tech traveled to Morgantown, West Virginia, to face the West Virginia Mountaineers in the annual battle for the Black Diamond Trophy. In West Virginia, Virginia Tech eked out a 22–20 victory with a last-second field goal from placekicker Shayne Graham. It was Tech's closest victory of the season and moved the Hokies to the No. 2 ranking in the country.

Following the win over West Virginia, Tech defeated Miami, 43–10, and Temple, 62–7, to clinch the Big East championship. In the final game of the regular season, the Hokies beat Boston College, 38–14, cementing the third unbeaten season in Virginia Tech history and the Hokies' first since 1954.

== Pregame buildup ==
In the month prior to the Sugar Bowl, media attention focused on Virginia Tech's sudden rise to national prominence and Florida State's perennial appearance in the national championship game. The Seminoles had the most top-5 finishes and the most national championship game appearances of any team in the 1990s, including a national championship victory in 1993. Many media stories focused on the apparent David and Goliath showdown between the two teams, with the Seminoles in the role of the overdog and the Hokies in the role of the underdog. Because of this fact, spread bettors favored Florida State to win the game by 5.5 points.

Tens of thousands of fans from both teams traveled to the game, often purchasing ticket and travel packages for thousands of dollars. The limited numbers of tickets available for the game were in high demand by fans of both teams.

=== Florida State offense ===
The Seminoles threw for no fewer than 229 passing yards in every game during the regular season and averaged 12.7 points per game more than its opponents. On the ground, the Seminoles averaged 122.8 rushing yards per game.

Leading the Florida State offense was quarterback Chris Weinke, a former baseball player who, at 27 years old, was by far the oldest player on the Seminoles' team. After suffering a neck injury in the 1998 college football season, Weinke recovered to complete 232 of 377 pass attempts for 3,103 yards, 25 touchdowns, and 14 interceptions.

Weinke's favorite target was wide receiver Peter Warrick, who led all Seminole receivers with 71 receptions and 931 yards in just nine games during the regular season. Five times, Warrick earned more than 100 receiving yards in a game. Warrick's season was shortened by a two-game suspension following his arrest for underpaying for clothes, but he still was named an All-America selection at wide receiver, signifying his status as one of the best players in the country at the position.

Florida State placekicker Sebastian Janikowski, who was born in Poland, also was a key component of the Seminoles' scoring offense. In his career at Florida State prior to the Sugar Bowl, Janikowski made 65 of 83 field goal attempts, including 33 of his previous 38 kicks of less than 50 yards. Janikowski also handled kickoffs, kicking the ball so hard that 57 of his 83 kickoffs were touchbacks. Janikowski was considered to have the potential to be an early selection in the 2000 NFL Draft by several scouts for professional teams.

=== Virginia Tech offense ===
During the regular season, Virginia Tech's offense outscored opponents by an average of 31 points per game. Tech averaged 254 yards rushing per game, the eighth-highest average in the nation. Important to that success was running back Shyrone Stith, who had 1,119 rushing yards during the regular season. Even more important to the Hokies' success, however, was quarterback Michael Vick.

Vick was recognized by multiple nationwide publications for his performance during the regular season. His passer rating was the highest of any quarterback in the country, and he completed 59.2 percent of his 152 passes for 1,840 yards, 12 touchdowns, and five interceptions. In addition, He rushed for 585 yards and eight touchdowns on 108 carries. Vick was named Big East Offensive Player of the Year and was the runner-up in voting for the Associated Press Player of the Year. Vick's average of 242 yards of total offense per game were the most in the country, and his 184 passing yards per game were the second-most. In addition, Vick finished third in the voting for the Heisman Trophy, traditionally given to the best college football player in the country. He was featured in multiple national publications, including on the cover of Sports Illustrated twice.

A handful of days before the Sugar Bowl, Tech wide receiver Ricky Hall broke a bone in his foot during practice and was considered unlikely to play. Hall was Tech's second-leading receiver, having caught 25 passes for 398 yards and three touchdowns. In addition, Hall was the Hokies' starting punt returner, and had returned 40 kicks for 510 yards and one touchdown, setting a school record for punt return yardage.

Tech placekicker Shayne Graham won Big East Special Teams Player of the Year honors after scoring 107 points during the regular season. That mark set a Big East record, and Graham's 372 career points during his four years with the Hokies were an NCAA record at the time. Graham's award ensured Tech won all five of the Big East's player and coach of the year awards.

=== Florida State defense ===
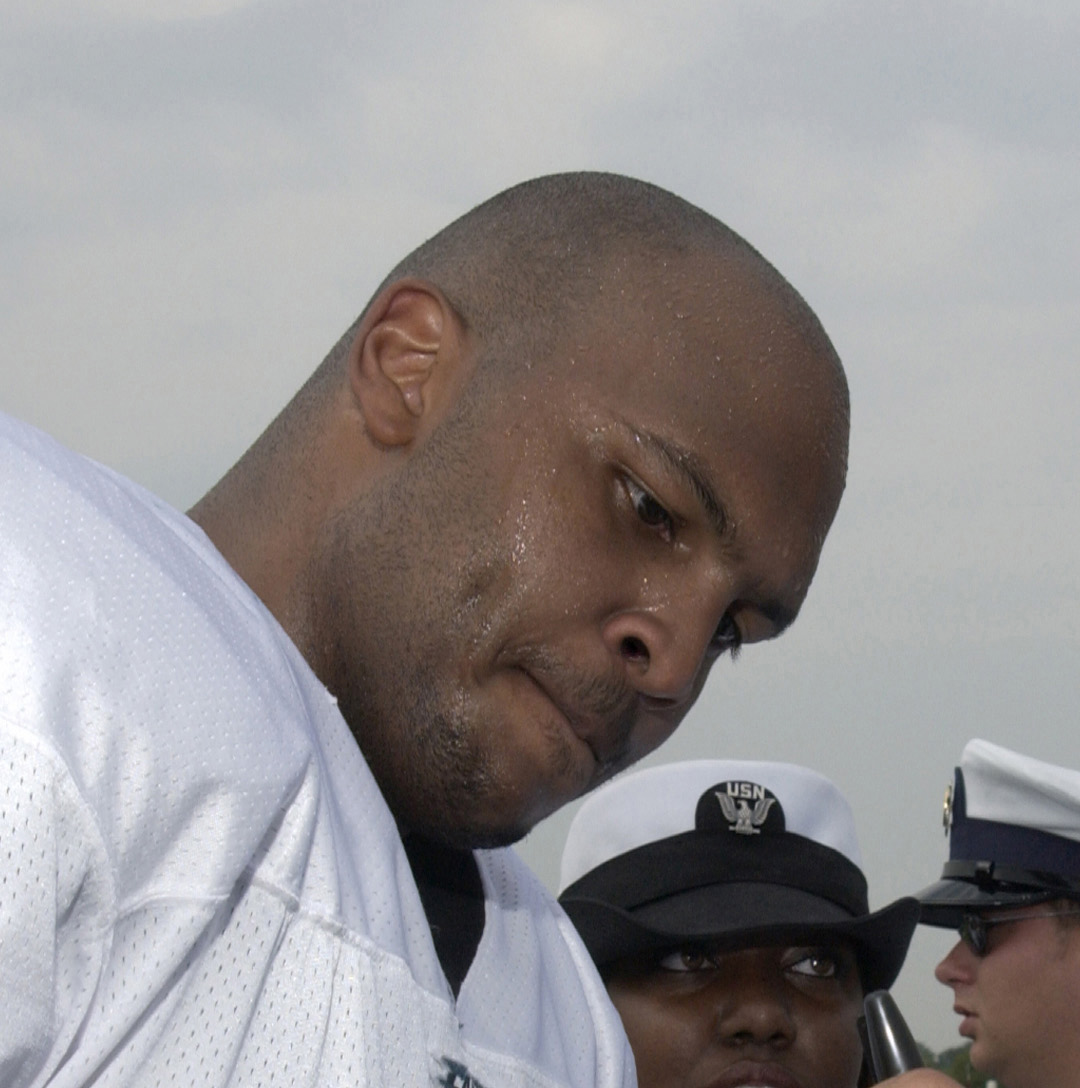
Florida State's Corey Simon was an All-America selection and was one of the leaders of the Seminole defense.

The Florida State defense was considered key to reining in Tech quarterback Vick. The Seminoles allowed less than 100 rushing yards per game on average, and intercepted 22 passes during the regular season. The Seminoles were ranked 15th nationally in pass defense at the end of the regular season but had allowed increasing amounts of pass yardage in the latter games of the season. Despite that fact, the Florida State defense's main concern was Michael Vick's ability to run the football. Said Florida State defensive coordinator Mickey Andrews: "A guy like that usually gives us problems, considering the type of (4–3 gap) defense we run. When a quarterback gets out of the pocket, that could hurt us for big yardage."

The Seminole defense was led by nose guard Corey Simon, who accumulated 48 solo tackles, four sacks, and one interception. For his accomplishments during the regular season, Simon earned consensus first-team All-America honors. Despite his accomplishments, Simon was not the Seminoles' leading tackler. That honor went to linebacker Tommy Polley, who accumulated 67 tackles during the season. Fellow linebacker Brian Allen contributed five quarterback sacks, the most in that statistical category for Florida State.

=== Virginia Tech defense ===
In the important category of scoring defense, the Hokies were the top-ranked defense in the country, allowing only 10.5 points per game. The team was ranked No. 3 in the country in both total defense and rushing defense. On average, Tech allowed just 247.3 total yards and 75.9 rushing yards per game. Tech's pass defense was No. 7 in the country, allowing an average of 171.4 passing yards per game. The Hokies permitted no more than 226 passing yards to any team during the regular season, and no opposing player earned 100 receiving yards. Tech defenders also accumulated 58 sacks during the season.

Virginia Tech defensive end Corey Moore was the top performer on the Hokie defense. Moore accumulated 55 tackles and 17 sacks during the regular season, and was named Big East Defensive Player of the Year and to the Associated Press All-America team. In the first week of December, Moore was awarded the Bronko Nagurski Trophy, given to the best defensive college football player in the country. Tech's other defensive end was John Engelberger, who earned seven sacks, six other tackles for loss and 16 quarterback hurries. Engelberger was projected by pro scouts to be the first Tech player selected in the 2000 NFL Draft.

== Game summary ==
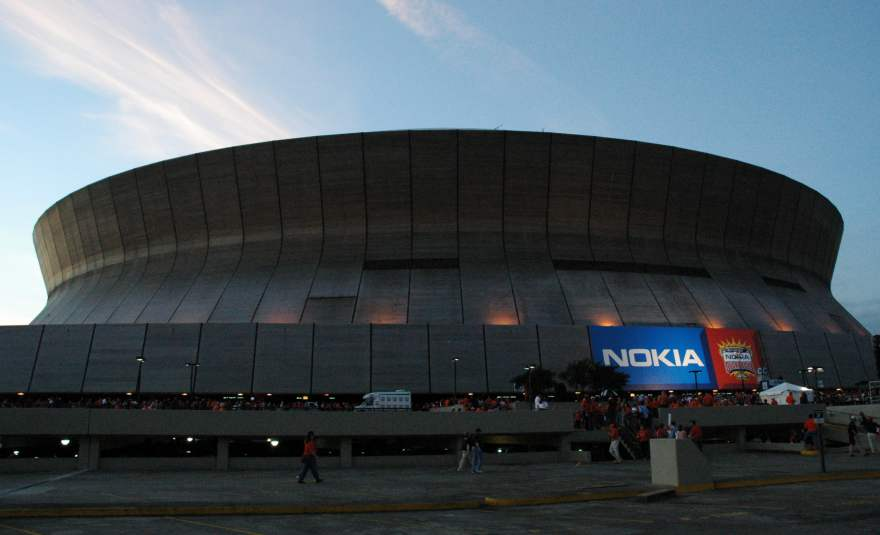
The Louisiana Superdome was the site of the 2000 Sugar Bowl.

The 2000 Sugar Bowl kicked off at 8 p.m. EST on January 4, 2000, at the Louisiana Superdome, in New Orleans. A crowd of 79,280 people attended the game in person, and an estimated 18.4 million people watched the game's television broadcast on ABC, earning the broadcast a television rating of 17.5, the third-highest rating ever recorded for a BCS game. ABC estimates were higher, speculating that at least 54 million people watched at least a portion of the broadcast. Brent Musburger, Gary Danielson, Lynn Swann, and Jack Arute were the television commentators for the event, and Ron Franklin, Mike Gottfried, and Adrian Karsten provided commentary for the ESPN Radio broadcast of the game. In exchange for their performance at the game, Virginia Tech and Florida State each received more than $4 million.

The traditional pregame singing of the national anthem was performed by the Zion Harmonizers, a New Orleans gospel quartet. Steve Shaw was the referee. Actor John Goodman performed the ceremonial pre-game coin toss to determine first possession of the ball. Florida State won the coin toss and elected to kick off to Virginia Tech to begin the game.

=== First quarter ===
Virginia Tech received the game's opening kickoff in their end zone for a touchback, and the Tech offense began at its 20-yard line. On the game's first play, Tech committed a five-yard false start penalty. Running back Shyrone Stith was stopped for a loss on the first non-penalty play of the game, but Tech made up both that loss and the penalty when quarterback Michael Vick scrambled for 25 yards and a first down. Vick then ran for another nine yards, pushing the line of scrimmage near midfield. Tech executed an option run to Stith, who ran inside the Florida State 30-yard line. Tech picked up a few yards with a run up the middle, then Vick completed a pass to Davis, giving the Hokies a first down at the Florida State 13-yard line. Stith picked up seven yards on a rush to the six-yard line, but the Seminole defense stiffened, and Tech was unable to pick up the remaining three yards needed for a first down. Facing a fourth down and needing less than a yard to pick up another first down inside the Florida State three-yard line, Tech head coach Frank Beamer kept his offense on the field to attempt to gain the first down rather than kick a field goal. On the attempt, however, Vick fumbled the ball forward into the end zone, where Florida State recovered it for a touchback. Virginia Tech was thus denied the first score of the game, and Florida State's offense entered the game for the first time.

Starting at their 20-yard line after the touchback, Florida State's first play was a five-yard rush by running back Travis Minor. Quarterback Chris Weinke then completed a three-yard pass to wide receiver Peter Warrick, who was stopped short of the first down. After the next play failed to gain positive yardage, the Seminoles were forced to punt. Virginia Tech's offense began their second series after a short punt return to the 31-yard line. After an incomplete pass from Vick, Stith picked up a Tech first down with two running plays. From their 43-yard line, Tech executed an end-around for a first down. Florida State also committed a five-yard facemask penalty that pushed Tech to the Seminoles' 40-yard line. Tech was stopped for losses on subsequent plays and committed a five-yard false start penalty, but Vick completed an 18-yard pass to Davis for a first down, making up the losses. Tech was unable to make good the losses accumulated on the next three plays, when Vick was sacked after throwing two incomplete passes. Tech punted, the ball rolled into the end zone, and Florida State's offense began again at its 20-yard line. Weinke threw two incomplete passes before connecting on a first-down throw to wide receiver Ron Dugans. On the next play, Weinke connected on a 64-yard throw to Warrick for a Florida State touchdown and the first points of the game. The extra point attempt was successful, and Florida State took a 7–0 lead with 3:22 remaining in the first quarter.

Following Florida State's post-touchdown kickoff, Virginia Tech's offense began its third possession of the game at the Tech 24-yard line after a short kick return. Running back Andre Kendrick ran for a short gain, but on the next play Vick was called for an intentional grounding penalty while attempting to avoid a sack. The Hokies were unable to make up the yardage lost by the penalty and punted after failing to gain a first down. Owing to the penalty, Tech punter Jimmy Kibble was forced to kick from his own end zone. Florida State was able to break through the Tech offensive line during the punt and blocked the kick. The ball was picked up by Florida State defender Jeff Chaney, who dashed into the end zone for Florida State's second touchdown of the game. The score and extra point gave Florida State a 14–0 lead with 2:14 remaining in the first quarter.

Florida State's kickoff was downed for a touchback, and Tech began at its 20-yard line. On the first play of the possession, Florida State committed a 15-yard pass interference penalty that gave Tech a first down at its 35-yard line. Tech was further aided by two five-yard penalties against Florida State that gave the Hokies another first down, and Vick completed a short pass across midfield. On the first play in Florida State territory, Vick completed a 49-yard throw to wide receiver André Davis for Tech's first touchdown of the game. The extra point attempt was good, and with 30 seconds remaining in the quarter, Tech narrowed Florida State's lead to 14–7.

Following Virginia Tech's kickoff and a touchback, Florida State's offense started work at its 20-yard line. Tech committed a five-yard penalty, and as the final seconds of the quarter ticked off, Florida State ran up the middle for five yards and a first down. At the end of the first quarter, the score was 14–7, Florida State leading.

=== Second quarter ===
The second quarter began with Florida State in possession of the ball, facing a first down at its 30-yard line. After picking up short yardage on two consecutive plays, Weinke completed a 63-yard pass to Dugans, who ran down the field for a touchdown. The extra point was successful, and with 13:45 remaining in the second quarter, Florida State extended its lead to 21–7. Following the Florida State kickoff, Virginia Tech returned the ball to the 33-yard line, where Tech's offense began operations. Tech committed an offensive pass interference penalty, and Tech was forced to punt after being unable to gain a first down after the penalty. The Seminoles' Peter Warrick was assigned to return the punt, and he fielded the ball at the Florida State 41-yard line. Thanks to several key blocks from other Florida State players, Warrick was able to run 59 unimpeded yards to the end zone for a touchdown. With 11:34 still remaining before halftime, the Seminoles extended their lead to 28–7.

Following the Florida State kickoff, Virginia Tech attempted to answer Florida State's kick-return touchdown with one of its own. Kendrick fielded the ball at the Virginia Tech goal line and returned it 63 yards, all the way to the Florida State 37-yard line, where the Hokie offense began work. Despite the good field position, Tech was unable to gain a first down. Tech kicker Shayne Graham was sent into the game, seemingly to attempt a 51-yard field goal. Instead of kicking the ball, Graham attempted to run the ball for a first down. Graham fumbled short of the first down, and Florida State took over on offense with 9:43 remaining in the first half.

On the Seminoles' first offensive play of the drive, they attempted a flea flicker pass, which was caught by Warrick at the Virginia Tech 33-yard line for a 33-yard gain. Following the play, Weinke was sacked for the first time by the Tech defense. This was followed immediately by Tech's second sack, which pushed Weinke back into the Seminoles' side of the field. On the third play of the Seminole drive, Weinke attempted to scramble for yardage, but was stopped short of the needed mark. Florida State's punt was downed at the Virginia Tech one-yard line, which was where the Tech offense began work. Florida State's defense prevented the Hokies from gaining a first down, and Tech again had to punt from its end zone.

Following the kick and a short return, Florida State began a drive at the Tech 34-yard line, seemingly in excellent field position. But on the first play of the State drive, the Seminoles were stopped for a loss. State was able to pick up a short gain on the second play, but on the third, Weinke was sacked for the third time in the game. After the Seminole punt and a touchback, Tech's offense started at its 20-yard line. The Hokies picked up a first down with an option run to Stith, then Vick ran for a long gain and another first down at the Florida State 20-yard line. Stith picked up seven yards on a rush up the middle of the field, then Vick completed a first-down pass to Derek Carter inside the Seminole 10-yard line. Kendrick advanced the ball to the Seminole three-yard line, then Vick ran the remaining yardage for a touchdown. Following the extra point, Tech cut Florida State's lead to 28–14 with 37 seconds remaining in the first half.

After the Virginia Tech kickoff and a Florida State return to their 17-yard line, Florida State began running out the clock to bring the half to an end. At halftime, Florida State held a 28–14 lead over Virginia Tech.

=== Halftime ===
At halftime, several organizations and groups performed under the overarching theme of a "Gospel Jubilee." The halftime show was organized by Douglas K. Green and Bowl Games of America, a company founded to provide similar services to bowl games across the United States. Multiple high school bands and dance teams from Kansas to Florida entertained the crowd.

=== Third quarter ===
Because Virginia Tech received the ball to begin the game, Florida State received the ball to begin the second half. The Seminoles returned the kickoff to their 22-yard line, and on the first play of the second half attempted a lateral pass. Virginia Tech defender Corey Moore knocked the ball down and out of bounds, causing a loss of 16 yards. Despite the loss, Weinke was able to make good the needed yards with a 28-yard pass to Minor. Minor picked up short yardage on a run up the middle, then Weinke passed for another first down, advancing the ball to the State 45-yard line. On first down, Weinke fumbled, but managed to recover the ball after a five-yard loss. Unlike before, State was unable to regain the lost yardage and was forced to punt. Virginia Tech returned the kick to their 33-yard line, where the Tech offense began work.

Vick passed for six yards, then ran an option for 12 yards and a first down. Now on State's side of the field, however, the Tech offense was unable to gain another first down and punted back to Florida State, which returned the kick to its 21-yard line. State was stopped short on consecutive plays, committed a five-yard false start penalty, then was stopped for no gain on third down. After going three and out, State punted back to the Hokies, who returned the ball to the Seminoles' 41-yard line. On the first play of the drive, Vick completed a 26-yard pass to the Tech fullback, Hawkins. After three rushes failed to pick up the first down at the Florida State five-yard line, Tech coach Frank Beamer sent in Graham to kick a 23-yard field goal. The kick was successful, and with 7:54 remaining in the quarter, Tech cut Florida State's lead to 28–17.

Virginia Tech's post-touchdown kickoff was downed for a touchback, and Florida State's offense started a drive at its 20-yard line. Weinke completed one pass, but two others fell incomplete, and Florida State punted after again going three and out. The Hokies returned the State kick to the Seminoles' 36-yard line with a 45-yard return. Vick threw an incomplete pass, ran for seven yards, then handed it off to Kendrick, who broke through the Florida State defense and ran ahead 29 yards for a touchdown. Rather than attempt an extra point, Beamer ordered a two-point conversion in an attempt to cut Florida State's lead to just three points. The play, which was Tech's first two-point attempt that season, failed. Even without an extra point, the touchdown still cut Florida State's lead to 28–23.

After the post-score kickoff and return, Florida State began at its 22-yard line. Weinke completed a first-down pass to Warrick, but Warrick committed a 15-yard personal foul penalty in the process. On the next play, Weinke attempted a long pass downfield, but Tech defender Anthony Midget intercepted the ball at the Tech 41-yard line. Trailing by five, Tech's offense began a drive to potentially further cut Florida State's lead or put the Hokies in the lead themselves. After slipping on the field and taking a loss, Vick completed a 20-yard pass to Hawkins, who picked up a first down and pushed Tech to the Florida State 39-yard line. After a short rush by Kendrick, Vick scrambled to the State 21-yard line for another first down. On the next play, Vick was sacked for a seven-yard loss, but recovered the lost ground by running for 22 yards on the next play. With a first down at the Seminoles' seven-yard line, Vick handed the ball to Kendrick, who ran seven yards straight ahead for a Tech touchdown, giving the Hokies the lead for the first time in the game. Again, Beamer ordered a two-point conversion attempt, but again, Florida State stopped the Hokies short. Despite that failure to pick up the two-point conversion, Tech took a 29–28 lead with 2:13 remaining in the quarter.

The Seminoles returned Tech's post-score kick to their 15-yard line, where Florida State's offense began work again, hoping to regain the lead for State. Weinke completed a seven-yard pass to Warrick, then was sacked by the Virginia Tech defense. Weinke overcame the loss on the next play with a 19-yard first-down pass. State continued to advance the ball with short passes, as Weinke completed a five-yard throw. Chaney gained three yards on a rush to the right as the final seconds of the third quarter ticked off the clock, setting up an important third-down play. With one quarter remaining, Virginia Tech led Florida State, 29–28.

=== Fourth quarter ===
Florida State began the fourth quarter in possession of the ball and facing a third down, needing three yards for a first down. Weinke completed a pass for just short of the needed three yards. Instead of punting the ball away, Florida State head coach Bobby Bowden ordered the team to attempt to convert the first down. He brought backup quarterback Marcus Outzen into the game as a misdirection move, and instead of running a quarterback sneak as anticipated, Outzen tossed the ball to Minor, who ran for 16 yards and a first down. During the play, Virginia Tech committed a 15-yard personal foul penalty that advanced the ball further and gave Florida State a first down at the Virginia Tech 23-yard line. Weinke returned to the game and threw a 10-yard pass to Chaney for another first down. Weinke threw an incomplete pass, then Tech stopped a rush up the middle for no gain. On third down, Weinke connected on a touchdown pass to Dugans, returning the lead to Florida State. The Seminoles, as had Virginia Tech before them, elected to attempt a two-point conversion. Unlike Virginia Tech's failed two-point conversions, the Seminoles successfully earned two points with a pass to Warrick, and the scores gave Florida State a 36–29 lead with 12:59 remaining.

Tech received Florida State's kickoff at its goal line and returned the ball to the 11-yard line, where Tech's offense took over. Kendrick ran for 12 yards and a first down, but then Vick fumbled on a rush to the left. Florida State recovered the ball, and the Seminoles' offense was given the ball at the Virginia Tech 35-yard line. On the first play after the fumble, Chaney broke free for a long run that gave State a first down inside the Virginia Tech 10-yard line. The Seminoles were pushed backward on two consecutive plays and committed a chop block before Bowden was forced to send in Janikowski to kick a 32-yard field goal. The kick gave Florida State a 39–29 lead with 10:26 remaining in the game.

Janikowski's post-score kickoff was downed for a touchback, and Vick and the Tech offense began at their 20-yard line. On the Hokies' first play, Davis ran for 16 yards and a first down on an end-around similar to the one he ran in the first quarter. Despite that success, the Hokies were unable to gain another first down. Appearing to punt the ball away, Tech ran a trick play where the punter attempted to rush for a first down. He was stopped short of the needed mark, however, and Florida State's offense returned to the field, beginning at the Tech 43-yard line. On the first play after taking over, Weinke completed a 43-yard pass to Warrick for a touchdown. The score and extra point gave Florida State a 46–29 lead with 7:42 remaining in the game.

With less than half a quarter remaining and down by three scores, Virginia Tech had a nearly insurmountable deficit to overcome. The Hokies fielded the kickoff for a touchback, and the Tech offense began at its 20-yard line. On the Hokies' first and second plays of the drive, Vick was sacked for losses. The third play was an incomplete pass, and the Hokies were forced to punt. After fielding the kick at their 38-yard line, Florida State began running out the clock by running the ball. After failing to gain a first down on two consecutive rushes and an incomplete pass, Florida State punted. The ball rolled into the end zone, and Tech's offense began again at its 20-yard line. Vick threw for short yardage, then Kendrick ran for a first down at the Tech 37-yard line. Vick completed a 23-yard first down pass to Emmet Johnson, and the Hokies entered Florida State territory with the clock ticking steadily down. On the first play in Seminoles' territory, Vick completed another 23-yard pass, this time to Davis, who picked up a first down at the Florida State 23-yard line. Thanks to a holding penalty against the Seminoles, Tech was granted a first down at the State eight-yard line. Vick threw an incomplete pass, ran for three yards, and then threw another pass to a player who was stopped short of the goal line. Facing fourth down and needing just two yards for a touchdown, Tech attempted to pass for the touchdown, but Vick was sacked and turned the ball over on downs with 1:12 remaining. With almost no time remaining, Florida State continued running down the clock and earned the 46–29 victory.

== Scoring summary ==
Scoring Play	Score
First quarter
Florida State: Peter Warrick 64-yard pass from Chris Weinke (Sebastian Janikowski kick), 3:22	Florida State 7, Virginia Tech 0
Florida State: Jeff Chaney 6 yard blocked punt return (Sebastian Janikowski kick), 2:14	Florida State 14, Virginia Tech 0
Virginia Tech: André Davis 49-yard pass from Michael Vick (Shayne Graham kick), 0:30	Florida State 14, Virginia Tech 7
Second quarter
Florida State: Ron Dugans 63-yard pass from Chris Weinke (Sebastian Janikowski kick), 13:45	Florida State 21, Virginia Tech 7
Florida State: Peter Warrick 59 yard punt return (Sebastian Janikowski kick), 11:40	Florida State 28, Virginia Tech 7
Virginia Tech: Michael Vick 3-yard run (Shayne Graham kick), 0:37	Florida State 28, Virginia Tech 14
Third quarter
Virginia Tech: Shayne Graham 23-yard field goal, 7:54	Florida State 28, Virginia Tech 17
Virginia Tech: Andre Kendrick 29-yard run (2-point pass failed), 5:57	Florida State 28, Virginia Tech 23
Virginia Tech: Andre Kendrick 6-yard run (2-point pass failed), 2:13	Virginia Tech 29, Florida State 28
Fourth quarter
Florida State: Ron Dugans 14-yard pass from Chris Weinke (Peter Warrick pass from Chris Weinke), 12:59	Florida State 36, Virginia Tech 29
Florida State: Sebastian Janikowski 32-yard field goal, 10:26	Florida State 39, Virginia Tech 29
Florida State: Peter Warrick 43-yard pass from Chris Weinke (Sebastian Janikowski kick), 7:42	Florida State 46, Virginia Tech 29

== Statistical summary ==
In recognition of his performance during the game, Florida State wide receiver Peter Warrick was named the game's most valuable player. Warrick caught six passes for 163 yards and two touchdowns, leading all receivers in yardage and scores. Warrick also had a 59-yard punt return for a touchdown and a two-point conversion, accounting for 20 of the Seminoles' 46 points. The 20 points scored by Warrick were a Sugar Bowl record for most points scored by an individual player.

Despite Warrick's individual performance, Virginia Tech was more successful in a team effort, compiling 503 total yards compared to Florida State's 359 yards. Virginia Tech quarterback Michael Vick completed 15 of 29 passes for 225 passing yards and one passing touchdown. Vick also ran the ball 23 times for 97 yards in his performance as the game's leading rusher. Florida State quarterback Chris Weinke was the game's best passer, completing 20 of his 34 pass attempts for 329 yards, four touchdowns, and one interception.

Weinke's favorite target was game MVP Peter Warrick, but several other Seminoles also benefited from Weinke's passing efficiency. Ron Dugans caught five passes for 99 yards and two touchdowns, Minnis caught two passes for 25 yards, and Minor caught two for 23 yards. For Virginia Tech, Davis caught seven passes for 108 yards and a touchdown, Hawkins caught two passes for 49 yards, and Kendrick caught two passes for 27 yards.

In terms of rushing offense, the two teams differed wildly. Virginia Tech, led by Vick, ran for 278 rushing yards. Florida State, meanwhile, ran for just 30 yards. The Seminoles were led on the ground by Chaney, who carried the ball four times for 43 yards, and Minor, who carried the ball nine times for 35 yards. Much of these two players' rushing total was negated by Chris Weinke, who lost 41 yards on seven carries. Virginia Tech, bolstered by Vick's 97 rushing yards, also saw André Kendrick accumulate 69 yards and two touchdowns with 12 carries and Shyrone Stith pick up 68 yards on 11 carries.

Statistical comparison
	Virginia Tech	Florida State
First downs	24	15
Rushes-yards	52–278	23–30
Passing: Completions-Attempts-Interceptions	15–29–0	20–34–1
Passing yards	225	329
Total offense	81–503	57–359
Return yards	88	80
Punts-average	6–29.3	7–44.3
Fumbles-lost	3–3	2–0
Penalties-yards	6–65	7–59
Time of possession	36:25	23:35

== Postgame effects ==
Florida State's victory earned it the 1999 BCS national championship and brought the Seminoles' season to an end with an undefeated 12–0 record. By beginning the season at No. 1 and ending it in the same position, Florida State became the first college football team to stay ranked No. 1 for every week of the season after being ranked No. 1 in the preseason poll. Virginia Tech's loss brought it to a final record of 11–1, but the Hokies still completed their first 11-win season in school history. The 75 total points scored in the 2000 Sugar Bowl were a Sugar Bowl record at that point in the game's history.

=== Coaching changes ===
Both teams made changes to their respective coaching staffs in the weeks that followed the Sugar Bowl. Chuck Amato resigned from his position as linebackers coach for Florida State to take the head coaching position at North Carolina State. His role as linebackers coach was filled by Joe Kines, whom Bobby Bowden hired from the University of Georgia. Amato's role as assistant head coach was filled by Jim Gladden, who had been a coach at Florida State for more than 25 years at the time he was named the assistant head coach. At Virginia Tech, head coach Frank Beamer also made some changes to his coaching staff, promoting several position coaches to higher positions in the Tech football hierarchy.

=== Postseason awards ===
In recognition of their achievements during the regular season and during the 2000 Sugar Bowl, multiple players and coaches from each team earned awards and recognition after the conclusion of the game. Tech quarterback Michael Vick, despite leading the losing team in the Sugar Bowl, won an ESPY for college football player of the year on February 14, more than a month after the Sugar Bowl. In addition, Virginia Tech head coach Frank Beamer won multiple coach of the year awards, most notably the Bobby Dodd Coach of the Year Award, which was presented to Beamer on March 6. One of Beamer's assistant coaches, Bud Foster, was named the top defensive coordinator in Division I-A football by American Football Coach Magazine in its annual award. Florida State quarterback Chris Weinke won the 2000 Heisman Trophy after the conclusion of the 2000 college football season.

=== 2000 NFL draft ===
Several players from each team were picked by professional teams to play in the National Football League during the 2000 NFL draft, held April 15 and 16, in New York City. Florida State had three players selected in the first round of the draft and seven players taken overall. Peter Warrick was the first player picked, selected with the fourth overall selection by the Cincinnati Bengals. Defensive tackle Corey Simon was selected two picks later with the sixth overall selection, and placekicker Sebastian Janikowski was taken 17th. Later rounds saw Ron Dugans (66th), Laveranues Coles (78th), Jerry Johnson (101st), and Mario Edwards (180th) taken in the draft from Florida State. Other Players, Andrew Howard {CB}- Minnesota Vikings and Cory Burkhead {LB}- Pittsburgh Steelers, went to the supplement draft.

Virginia Tech had no players selected in the first round of the draft but saw five players taken from the second round onward. Defensive end John Engelberger was the first Hokie taken in the 2000 draft, and was picked with the 35th overall selection. He was followed by cornerback Ike Charlton, who was taken with the 52nd pick in the draft. Corey Moore (89th), Anthony Midget (134th), and Shyrone Stith (243rd) also were taken.

Some players who participated in the 2000 Sugar Bowl elected to delay their entry into the NFL Draft, either because they hoped to finish their education or because they were not three years removed from their high school graduations and thus were not eligible to enter the draft. Examples of these players included Florida State quarterback Chris Weinke, who returned to Florida State to complete his senior year, and Virginia Tech quarterback Michael Vick, who was not eligible to enter the draft in 2000, but who was taken with the first overall selection in the 2001 NFL draft.

=== Subsequent seasons ===
Florida State entered the 2000 college football season with hopes of following up its victory in the 2000 Sugar Bowl with another national championship. The Seminoles' regular-season performance differed slightly from 1999, as they lost a regular-season game to Miami, yet still appeared in a third consecutive national championship game: the 2001 Orange Bowl. Unlike in 2000, the Seminoles emerged on the losing side of a 13–2 score. Virginia Tech, like Florida State, had hoped to attend the national championship game again, but an injury to star quarterback Michael Vick caused the Hokies to lose a regular-season game at third-ranked Miami, eliminating them from national championship contention.

The following season, neither Florida State nor Virginia Tech competed for a national championship, but both teams played in the 2002 Gator Bowl, their first matchup in two years. Following the Gator Bowl, Florida State next met Virginia Tech in the 2005 ACC Championship Game after the Hokies left the Big East for the Atlantic Coast Conference. Florida State won that contest, 27–22. Not until the 2007 college football season did Virginia Tech finally avenge its losses to the Seminoles with a 40–21 win en route to an Atlantic Coast Conference championship. It was the first game in fifteen consecutive matchups between the two teams that Virginia Tech had won.
