= Mike Norvell =

American football coach (born 1981)

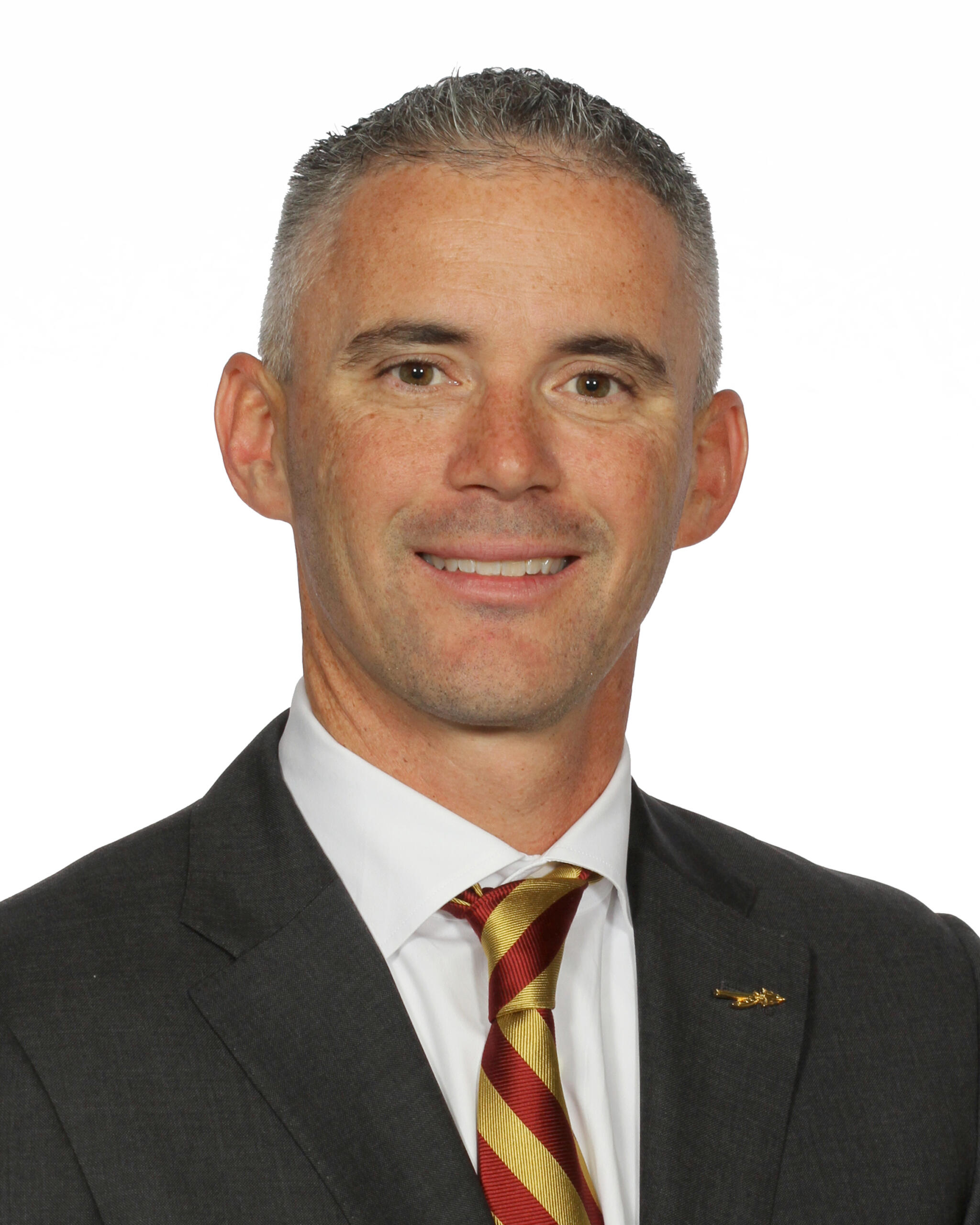
- Norvell in 2019

Biographical details
- Born: October 11, 1981 (age 45); Irving, Texas, U.S.

Playing career
- 2000: Louisiana Tech
- 2001–2005: Central Arkansas
- Position: Wide receiver

Coaching career (HC unless noted)
- 2006: Central Arkansas (GA)
- 2007–2008: Tulsa (GA)
- 2009: Tulsa (PGC/WR)
- 2010: Tulsa (PGC/WR/DR)
- 2011: Pittsburgh (co-OC/WR/DR)
- 2012–2013: Arizona State (OC/QB)
- 2014–2015: Arizona State (AHC/OC/QB)
- 2016–2019: Memphis
- 2020–2026: Florida State

Head coaching record
- Overall: 79–54
- Bowls: 1–4

Accomplishments and honors

Championships
- 1 AAC (2019); 1 ACC (2023); 3 AAC West Division (2017, 2018, 2019)

Awards
- Paul "Bear" Bryant Award (2023); Bobby Dodd Coach of the Year Award (2023); ACC Coach of the Year (2023); AFCA Regional Coach of the Year (2023)

Michael Norvell (born October 11, 1981) is an American college football coach. He was most recently the head football coach at Florida State, a position he held from 2020 until his firing in 2026. He was previously the head coach at Memphis, and has coached for Arizona State, Pittsburgh, Tulsa, and Central Arkansas. He played wide receiver at the University of Central Arkansas from 2001 to 2005 and is the school's all-time receptions leader.

== Playing career ==
Norvell played wide receiver at Grace Preparatory Academy in Arlington, Texas, coached by former Houston Oilers tight end Mike Barber. After graduating, because of his small physical stature, he decided to wait a year before walking on to a college football team. He enrolled in online college courses and became an assistant coach at Grace Prep in the early fall of 1999 at the age of 17 (turning 18 in October 1999).

Norvell then walked on at Louisiana Tech in 2000 and then transferred to the University of Central Arkansas (UCA) from 2001 to 2005 and played wide receiver. He set the school's all-time reception record with 213 pass receptions for 2,611 yards and 15 receiving touchdowns, 1 rushing touchdown, and 2 passing touchdowns during his career. During his senior season in 2005, Norvell was part of a UCA Bears team that won the Gulf South Conference championship, and made it to the quarterfinals of the NCAA Division II playoffs, finishing the season 11–3.

== Coaching career ==
=== Early career ===
In 2007, Norvell was hired for his first coaching role, with Tulsa, working under Gus Malzahn. His first offensive coordinator position was at Pitt with Todd Graham. The next season, he worked as the offensive coordinator for Arizona State, following Graham.

=== Memphis ===
On December 4, 2015, Norvell was introduced as the 24th head football coach of the Memphis Tigers. The youngest FBS head coach in the nation at the time of his hiring (aged 34), Norvell had overseen one of the nation's most explosive offenses at Arizona State under Todd Graham. Like Justin Fuente, Norvell was a young, up-and-coming offensive coordinator who employed an up-tempo, pass-oriented spread offense and brought the high-octane system with him to Memphis. One of Norvell's first moves as head coach was to retain Darrell Dickey from Fuente's staff, naming him associate head coach/co-offensive coordinator and running backs coach. The University of Memphis signed Norvell to a five-year contract that paid him a base salary of $1.8 million for his first year that would increase slightly each passing year.

The Tigers finished with an 8–5 record in 2016. With Riley Ferguson taking over as the team's starting quarterback, Memphis began the Norvell era with a 35–17 victory over FCS opponent Southeast Missouri State on September 3. The next week, Norvell's team defeated Kansas by a margin of 43–7. In the season's third game, the Tigers defeated Bowling Green 77–3 behind Ferguson's six passing touchdowns and one rushing touchdown in the game's first half. On October 1, Ole Miss handed Memphis its first loss of the season in a 48–28 rout. Five days later, the Tigers defeated Temple by a score of 34–27. That was followed by a 24–14 victory over Tulane on October 14. Memphis lost its next two; dropping a 42–28 contest to #24 Navy and a 59–30 blowout to Tulsa. On November 5, the Tigers defeated SMU by a score of 51–7. The next week, Norvell's Tigers lost a shootout to South Florida by a margin of 49–42. They closed the regular season with a 34–27 win over Cincinnati on November 18 and a 48–44 victory over #18 Houston in a shootout. The Tigers accepted a berth in the 2016 Boca Raton Bowl, a game they lost to Western Kentucky by a score of 51–31. In 13 starts in 2016, Riley Ferguson threw for 3,698 yards and broke Paxton Lynch's single-season record with 32 touchdown passes set the previous season. After the 2016 season, co-offensive coordinator Chip Long left the Tigers to take the same position on Brian Kelly's staff at Notre Dame. To replace Long, Darrell Dickey was named the team's sole offensive coordinator. On May 12, 2017, it was announced that the University of Memphis signed Norvell to a one-year contract extension though the 2021 season and gave his assistant coaches raises. Kicker Jake Elliott was selected in the fifth round with the 153rd overall pick in the 2017 NFL draft by the Cincinnati Bengals.

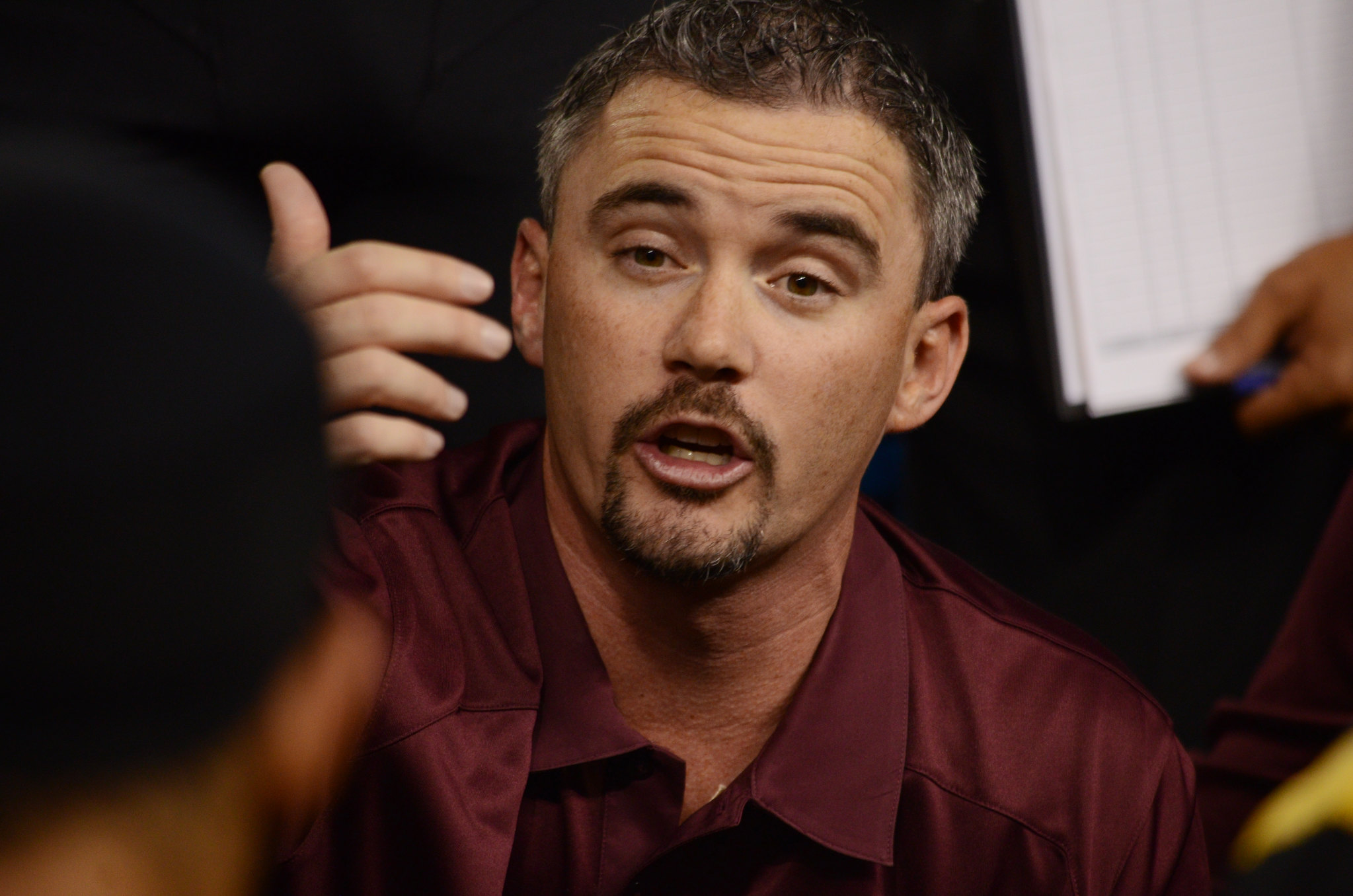
Norvell with Arizona State in 2013

Memphis went 10–3 in 2017. They started the season on August 31 with a 37–29 victory over Louisiana-Monroe. The Tigers were supposed to play UCF on September 9, but due to Hurricane Irma, the game, which originally had been moved up one day to September 8, was rescheduled for September 30. In order to reschedule the American Athletic Conference game, Memphis canceled their game with Georgia State, leaving the team with only 11 regular season games as opposed to the usual 12. On September 16, the Tigers upset #25 UCLA 48–45, marking only their second victory over a ranked opponent in 21 years. After a 44–31 victory over Football Championship Subdivision opponent Southern Illinois, Norvell's Tigers suffered their first loss of the season in the form of a 40–13 defeat in the rescheduled UCF game. On October 6, Memphis defeated UConn by a margin of 70–31. That was followed by a 30–27 victory over #25 Navy, marking the first time the Tigers had ever defeated two ranked opponents in a single season in school history. Ranked #25 in the country in the AP Poll, the Tigers won their third consecutive contest, defeating Houston 42–38. A fourth straight win followed on October 27 with a 56–26 blowout victory over Tulane. Norvell's Tigers made it five in a row with a 41–14 victory over Tulsa. On November 18, the Tigers defeated SMU in a high-scoring 66–45 contest to clinch the American Athletic Conference's West Division and a berth in the 2017 American Athletic Conference Football Championship Game. Memphis finished off the regular season with a 70–13 defeat of East Carolina, recording their seventh consecutive victory. In the 2017 American Athletic Conference Football Championship Game, the Tigers lost a hard-fought 62–55 double overtime contest to UCF. Memphis accepted a berth in the 2017 Liberty Bowl on their home field, losing the game to Iowa State by a score of 21–20. On December 5, 2017, Memphis signed Norvell to another contract extension, a five-year addition to his deal worth $13 million. The extension increased Norvell's annual pay to $2.6 million and made him the highest paid Group of 5 head coach in the country. Following the 2017 season, offensive coordinator Darrell Dickey left Norvell's staff to take the offensive coordinator position on newly hired head coach Jimbo Fisher's staff at Texas A&M. Kenny Dillingham was promoted from graduate assistant to replace Dickey.

After starting the 2018 season 4–4 overall and 1–3 in conference play, Memphis would win their last 4 games, including a 52–31 victory over Houston in the final week of the regular season to finish in a 3-way tie for first in the West with Houston and Tulane. After tiebreakers, Memphis was awarded with the West conference berth to the 2018 American Athletic Conference Football Championship Game, facing off against UCF again in Orlando. Despite having a 38–21 lead at the half, the Tigers would only manage to score 3 points in the second half and ended up losing 56–41. Memphis accepted a berth in the 2018 Birmingham Bowl, losing to Wake Forest 37–34 to finish the season 8–6.

The 2019 season was one of the best seasons in the program's history, as the Tigers went 11–1 in the regular season and clinched a spot in the 2019 American Athletic Conference Football Championship Game on December 7, the team's third championship appearance in a row. This time they faced Cincinnati, whom the Tigers defeated 34-24 the previous week to clinch home-field advantage for the championship game. After a back and forth battle between the two teams, Memphis quarterback Brady White would connect with Antonio Gibson for a go-ahead touchdown with 1:14 left in the 4th quarter to give Memphis a 29–24 victory over the Bearcats to win the conference championship. Since they were the highest ranked Group of Five team in the final college football playoff poll, they were awarded a New Year's Six bowl berth to the Cotton Bowl against Penn State. The next day, Norvell left Memphis to become the new head coach at Florida State.

=== Florida State ===
On December 8, 2019, Florida State University formally announced Norvell as its head football coach. His contract was initially for $26.5 million over 6 years. On October 17, 2020, Norvell led the Seminoles to a win over North Carolina, becoming the first ACC coach to defeat a Top 20 opponent in their first year; the team finished with a record of 3–6 in Norvell's first season. However, Norvell tested positive for COVID-19 ahead of the rivalry game with the University of Miami, and was not available for that game.

In Norvell's second season with the Seminoles, the program finished 5-7, despite an 0–4 start, and showed remarkable improvement in the rebuild of the organization.

In his third season, Florida State started off strong with a 4–0 record and entered the rankings at #23. This included a 24–23 victory over the eventual SEC West champion LSU in the first edition of the Louisiana Kickoff in New Orleans. They then lost three consecutive games to ACC Atlantic foes Wake Forest, NC State, and Clemson before handily defeating Georgia Tech, rival Miami, and Syracuse. They became bowl eligible for the first time since 2019 following their 45–3 defeat of Miami, and reached #19 in the College Football Playoff rankings following their 38–3 defeat of Syracuse. Following a 49–17 home victory against Sun Belt Conference foe, Louisiana, FSU jumped four ranked spots in the AP Poll to #16, a season high since week 4 of the 2017 season. The Seminoles notched their first victory over Florida in four years, and fans rushed the field in celebration; it marked the highest scoring game in the rivalry and completed a sweep of the Seminoles' rivals, the Hurricanes and Gators, for the first time under Norvell.

The result in 2022 was 2nd place in the ACC Atlantic. Florida State was invited to the Cheez-It Bowl, where they defeated Oklahoma by a score of 35–32 for Norvell's first career bowl win. The Seminoles finished 10–3, the first season of double-digit wins since 2016, and were ranked #11 in the final AP Poll and #10 in the final Coaches' Poll, finishing as the highest-ranked ACC team in the country.

In the off-season of his fourth year, Florida State extended Norvell to a new contract averaging $8.05 million per year.

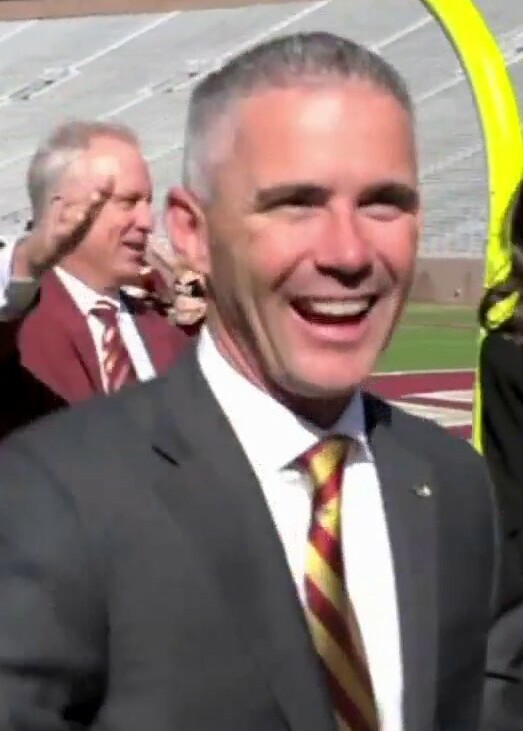
Norvell coached the Seminoles to an ACC title in the 2023 season.

At the start of the 2023 season, Norvell and the Seminoles were ranked #8 in the AP Poll. Florida State defeated then #14 Louisville Cardinals in the ACC Championship Game, and claimed their first conference championship since the 2014 season, the school's 19th conference title. Norvell and Florida State ended the season with a 13–0 record and the Seminoles were ranked fifth in the College Football Playoff committee’s final rankings, becoming the first undefeated Power Five conference champion to be left out of the Playoff, to great controversy amongst college football fans and media. The CFP committee cited a season-ending injury to quarterback Jordan Travis as the main factor in leaving the Seminoles out. The Seminoles were instead invited to the Orange Bowl to face the Georgia Bulldogs. with multiple Seminole players opting out, Florida State was routed 63–3. For the team's accomplishments, Norvell was named ACC Coach of the Year, won the Bobby Dodd Trophy, and was awarded as the Paul “Bear” Bryant National Coach of the Year.

Although it was not apparent at the time, Norvell's tenure at Florida State had crested. The 2024 Seminoles ended with a 2–10 record, the team's worst since 1974. After the disastrous 2024 season, FSU fired both the offensive and defensive coordinator.

Norvell's Seminoles began the 2025 season with an upset win over eighth-ranked Alabama before setting school records with the largest win in program history the following week, matching the previous year's win total. The Seminoles would go on to suffer four consecutive defeats, starting 0–4 in conference play for the first time in program history. Prior to the last game of the regular season, the university announced that Norvell would be returning as coach for the 2026 season. Florida State would go on to finish with a losing record and be ineligible for a bowl game.

Following a 36–24 loss to rival Clemson, on November 1, 2026, Norvell was fired.

== Personal life ==
Norvell is married to Maria Norvell (Chiolino), with whom he has a daughter.

== Head coaching record ==
Year	Team	Overall	Conference	Standing	Bowl/playoffs	Coaches^{#}	AP^{°}
Memphis Tigers (American Athletic Conference) (2016–2019)
2016	Memphis	8–5	5–3	T–3rd (West)	L Boca Raton		
2017	Memphis	10–3	7–1	1st (West)	L Liberty	24	25
2018	Memphis	8–6	5–3	T–1st (West)	L Birmingham		
2019	Memphis	12–1	7–1	T–1st (West)	Cotton*^{†}	17	17
Memphis:		38–15	24–8	* Departed Memphis for Florida State before bowl game.			
Florida State Seminoles (Atlantic Coast Conference) (2020–present)
2020	Florida State	3–6	2–6	13th			
2021	Florida State	5–7	4–4	T–4th (Atlantic)			
2022	Florida State	10–3	5–3	2nd (Atlantic)	W Cheez-It	10	11
2023	Florida State	13–1	8–0	1st	L Orange^{†}	6	6
2024	Florida State	2–10	1–7	17th			
2025	Florida State	5–7	2–6	T–13th			
2026	Florida State	3–5 (Note: Norvell was fired eight games into the 2026 season.)	1–4				
Florida State:		41–39	23–30				
Total:		79–54					
National championship Conference title Conference division title or championship game berth
^{†}Indicates CFP / New Years' Six bowl.; ^{#}Rankings from final Coaches Poll.; ^{°}Rankings from final AP Poll.
