= Alex Mastromanno =

Australian punter in American football

No. 29
- Position: Punter
- Class: Redshirt Senior

Personal information
- Born: Melbourne, Australia
- Listed height: 6 ft 2 in (1.88 m)
- Listed weight: 243 lb (110 kg)

Career information
- High school: Brighton Grammar School (Melbourne, Australia)
- College: Florida State (2020–2024)

Awards and highlights
- Consensus All-American (2024); First-team All-ACC (2024); Second-team All-ACC (2023)

Alex Mastromanno is an Australian American football punter for the Florida State Seminoles.

== Early life ==
Mastromanno is from Melbourne, Australia. He grew up playing Australian rules football, which he started at age three or four. He also competed in tennis and track and field growing up. He played for Old Brighton Grammarians Football Club in the Victorian Amateur Football Association (VAFA) and was a nominee for the league's rising star award in 2017. He also played for the Collingwood reserve side in the Victorian Football League (VFL).

Mastromanno later became interested in American football and joined Nathan Chapman's ProKick Australia academy. Recruited to play college football in the U.S. as a punter, he was ranked a two-star prospect by 247Sports and committed to the Florida State Seminoles (FSU) in December 2019.

== College career ==
Mastromanno served as Florida State's main punter as a freshman in 2020, recording an average of 43.5 yards per punt which ranked seventh in the Atlantic Coast Conference (ACC) and 33rd nationally. He remained the starter in 2021, playing in 12 games and being chosen fourth-team All-ACC and FSU's special teams MVP after averaging 42.7 yards per punt with 18 punts inside the 20 and a long of 65 yards. In 2022, he punted 34 times with an average of 41.8 yards per punt, having a long of 53 and five punts of over 50 yards.

In 2023, Mastromanno averaged 45.5 yards per punt, placing second in the ACC and 15th nationally. He was named second-team All-ACC, second-team All-American and a finalist for the Ray Guy Award for best punter nationally, being FSU's first-ever finalist for the award. He returned for a final season in 2024 and broke the ACC record and ranked first nationally with an average of 49.3 yards per punt, being named first-team All-ACC and a finalist for the Ray Guy Award. He was also named a first-team All-American.

== Professional career ==
Pre-draft measurables
Height	Weight	Arm length	Hand span
6 ft 1 3/4 in (1.87 m)	243 lb (110 kg)	31 1/4 in (0.79 m)	8 5/8 in (0.22 m)
All values from Pro Day

Mastromanno went unselected in the 2025 NFL draft.
