= Adam Fuller =

American football coach

Los Angeles Chargers
- Title: Safeties coach

Career information
- College: Sacred Heart

Career history
- WPI (1998) Linebackers coach; Wagner (1999–2000) Linebackers coach; Wagner (2001–2003) Special teams coach & defensive backs coach; Wagner (2004) Co-defensive coordinator; Richmond (2005) Defensive backs coach; Richmond (2006–2007) Special teams coach & linebackers coach; Assumption (2008) Head coach; Chattanooga (2009–2012) Defensive coordinator; Marshall (2013–2016) Assistant head coach & linebackers coach; Marshall (2017) Assistant head coach, special teams coach & linebackers coach; Marshall (2018) Defensive coordinator & safeties coach; Memphis (2019) Defensive coordinator; Florida State (2020–2024) Defensive coordinator; Los Angeles Chargers (2025–present) Safeties coach

Head coaching record
- Career: NCAA: 1–9 (.100)

Adam Fuller is an American football coach who currently serves as the safeties coach for the Los Angeles Chargers of the National Football League (NFL). He previously spent four seasons as the defensive coordinator at Florida State University (2020–2024), where he led one of the nation's top defensive units during the 2022 and 2023 seasons. Fuller has over two decades of coaching experience, primarily at the collegiate level, including tenures at Memphis, Marshall, and Chattanooga.

== Career ==
=== Early coaching career ===
A native of Massachusetts, Fuller began his coaching career in 1998 at Worcester Polytechnic Institute as the linebackers coach. He then joined Wagner College (1999–2004), where he coached linebackers, defensive backs, special teams, and served as co-defensive coordinator. Fuller moved to Richmond in 2005, eventually becoming special teams and linebackers coach. While at Richmond, he helped develop three future NFL Draft picks and played a key role in the team reaching the FCS playoffs.

In 2008, Fuller was named head coach at Assumption College in Worcester, Massachusetts, for one season. He then became defensive coordinator at Chattanooga (2009–2012), where he led one of the most improved defenses in FCS, helping the Mocs go from a one-win season to six wins in his first year.

From 2013–2018, Fuller served on the defensive staff at Marshall University. He was promoted to defensive coordinator in 2018 after holding roles such as assistant head coach, linebackers coach, and special teams coordinator. Under Fuller, Marshall fielded some of its strongest defensive units, including a 2018 team that ranked 7th nationally in sacks and 8th in rushing defense.

=== Memphis ===
In 2019, Fuller joined Memphis as defensive coordinator under head coach Mike Norvell. That season, the Tigers went 12-2, won the American Athletic Conference Championship, and earned a berth in the Cotton Bowl. Fuller's defense ranked in the top 25 nationally in both pass efficiency defense and tackles for loss.

=== Florida State (2020–2024) ===
Fuller was hired as Florida State's defensive coordinator on December 12, 2019. His four-year tenure saw both struggles and success, peaking during the 2022 and 2023 seasons.

In 2020, Fuller began a rebuild with a defense that featured 12 first-time starters. CB Asante Samuel Jr. earned first-team All-ACC honors and was later drafted by the Los Angeles Chargers.

The 2021 defense ranked second in the ACC in red zone defense (70.6%) and 12th nationally in tackles for loss per game (7.2). DE Jermaine Johnson II was named the 2021 ACC Defensive Player of the Year and a first-round NFL Draft pick after leading the conference in sacks (12.0) and tackles for loss (18.0).

In 2022, Fuller oversaw one of the most dominant defenses in college football. FSU ranked 4th nationally in passing yards allowed (165.4 ypg), 12th in sacks per game (3.08), and 15th in total defense (321.8 ypg). The Seminoles went 10-3 and finished the season ranked No. 11 in the AP poll. DB Jammie Robinson and DE Jared Verse earned All-America and first-team All-ACC honors, while LB Patrick Payton was named ACC Defensive Rookie of the Year.

Florida State's defense remained strong in 2023 during the team's 13-1 campaign. The Seminoles again ranked among the national leaders in scoring defense (19.3 ppg allowed), sacks, and takeaways. However, a disastrous 2024 season followed, with FSU starting 1-9. On November 10, 2024, Fuller was relieved of his duties.

=== Los Angeles Chargers ===
On February 5, 2025, Fuller was hired as safeties coach for the Los Angeles Chargers He joined a defensive staff led by Jesse Minter and works alongside DBs coach Steve Clinkscale. Fuller called the opportunity a "perfect fit" and praised the organization’s collaborative culture."Adam Fuller on Joining the Chargers Staff".

== Playing career ==
Fuller played linebacker at Sacred Heart University from 1994–1997, where he was an All-American in 1996 and team captain in 1997. He earned his bachelor's degree in criminal justice and later received a master’s degree in secondary education from Wagner.

== Personal life ==
Fuller and his wife, Hope, have two sons, Jack and Aidan.

== Head coaching record ==
| Year | Team | Overall | Conference | Standing | Bowl/playoffs |
|---|---|---|---|---|---|
Assumption Greyhounds (Northeast-10 Conference) (2008)
| 2008 | Assumption | 1–9 | 1–7 | T–7th | |
| Assumption: | | 1–9 | 1–7 | | |
| Total: | | 1–9 | | | |
