= Patrick Payton =

American football player (born 2002)

Profile
- Position: Defensive end
- Class: Redshirt Senior

Personal information
- Born: September 28, 2002 (age 24)
- Listed height: 6 ft 5 in (1.96 m)
- Listed weight: 260 lb (118 kg)

Career information
- High school: Miami Northwestern (Miami, Florida)
- College: Florida State (2021–2024); LSU (2025–present)

Awards and highlights
- ACC Defensive Rookie of the Year (2022)
- Stats at ESPN

f

Patrick Payton (born September 28, 2002) is an American football defensive end who last played for the LSU Tigers. He previously played for the Florida State Seminoles. He was named the 2022 ACC Defensive Rookie of the Year.

== Early life ==
Payton attended Miami Northwestern Senior High School in Miami, Florida. As a junior, he had 17.5 sacks. He committed to Florida State University to play college football.

== College career ==
=== Florida State ===
After redshirting his first year at Florida State in 2021, Payton earned playing time in 2022. He played in 13 games, finishing with 31 tackles and five sacks and was named the ACC Defensive Rookie of the Year.

On December 18, 2024, Payton announced that he would enter the transfer portal.

=== LSU ===
On December 21, 2024, Payton announced that he would transfer to LSU.

== Professional career ==
Pre-draft measurables
Height	Weight	Arm length	Hand span	Wingspan
6 ft 4 7/8 in (1.95 m)	260 lb (118 kg)	33 1/2 in (0.85 m)	10 in (0.25 m)	6 ft 8 5/8 in (2.05 m)
All values from NFL Combine

In May 2026, Payton attended rookie minicamp with the Carolina Panthers.
