= Chase Lundt =

American football player (born 2000)

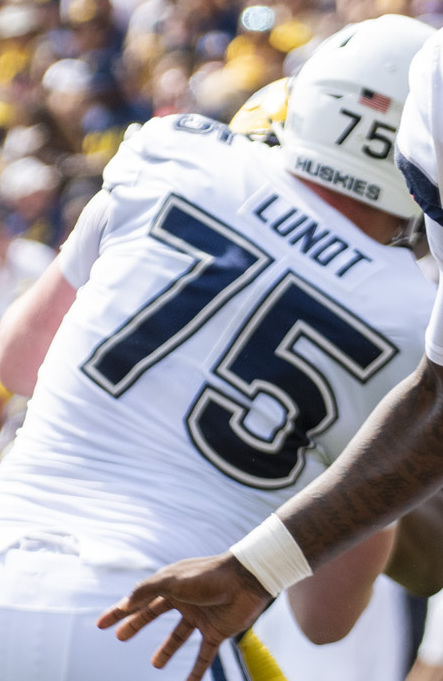
- Lundt with UConn in 2022

No. 77 – Buffalo Bills
- Position: Offensive tackle
- Roster status: Practice squad

Personal information
- Born: June 16, 2000 (age 26); Plano, Texas, U.S.
- Listed height: 6 ft 7 in (2.01 m)
- Listed weight: 304 lb (138 kg)

Career information
- High school: Martin (Arlington, Texas)
- College: UConn (2019–2024)
- NFL draft: 2025: 6th round, 206th overall pick

Career history
- Buffalo Bills (2025–present)

Career NFL statistics as of 2025
- Games played: 2
- Stats at Pro Football Reference

Chase Lundt (born June 16, 2000) is an American professional football offensive tackle for the Buffalo Bills of the National Football League (NFL). He played college football for the UConn Huskies and was selected by the Bills in the sixth round of the 2025 NFL draft.

== Early life ==
From Arlington, Texas, Lundt attended Martin High School where he played football. He played two seasons at Martin as a tackle and served as team captain while being named all-district. He was ranked a two-star recruit and committed to play college football for the UConn Huskies.

== College career ==
Lundt redshirted as a freshman at UConn in 2019, then did not play in the 2020 season, as UConn canceled it due to the COVID-19 pandemic. He won the starting right tackle job in 2021 and remained a starter for the rest of his collegiate career. In his tenure at UConn, Lundt only missed one game, during the 2021 season. He started 11 games in 2021, all 13 games in 2022, and then all 12 games in 2023, helping UConn allow only 13 sacks in the last season. He returned for a final season in 2024. As a senior in 2024, he allowed no sacks and was named a Group of Five All-American. He finished his collegiate career with 49 starts and accepted an invite to the 2025 Senior Bowl, although he was unable to participate due to injury.

== Professional career ==
Pre-draft measurables
Height	Weight	Arm length	Hand span	Wingspan	40-yard dash	10-yard split	20-yard split	Bench press
6 ft 7 1/2 in (2.02 m)	304 lb (138 kg)	32 5/8 in (0.83 m)	9 5/8 in (0.24 m)	6 ft 5 3/4 in (1.97 m)	5.40 s	1.76 s	2.99 s	20 reps
All values from NFL Combine/Pro Day

Lundt was selected 206th overall in the sixth round in the 2025 NFL draft by the Buffalo Bills. He made two appearances for the Bills during his rookie campaign. On December 19, 2025, Lundt was placed on season-ending injured reserve due to a knee injury.

On August 30, 2026, Lundt was waived by the Bills as a part of final roster cuts; he was re–signed to the team's practice squad the next day.
