= Clay Webb =

American football player (born 2000)

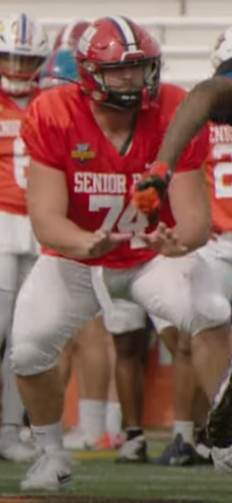
- Webb at the 2025 Senior Bowl

Profile
- Position: Guard

Personal information
- Born: March 28, 2000 (age 26); Oxford, Alabama, U.S.
- Listed height: 6 ft 3 in (1.91 m)
- Listed weight: 312 lb (142 kg)

Career information
- High school: Oxford (Oxford, Alabama)
- College: Georgia (2019–2021); Jacksonville State (2022–2024)
- NFL draft: 2025: undrafted

Career history
- Denver Broncos (2025)*; Tennessee Titans (2025)*
- * Offseason or practice squad member only

Awards and highlights
- CFP national champion (2021); First-team All-CUSA (2024); Second-team All-CUSA (2023)
- Stats at Pro Football Reference

Robert Clayton Webb (born March 28, 2000) is an American professional football guard. He played college football for the Georgia Bulldogs and Jacksonville State Gamecocks and was signed by the Denver Broncos as an undrafted free agent in 2025.

== Early life ==
Webb attended Oxford High School in Oxford, Alabama, where he played football and wrestling. In his sophomore, junior, and senior years Webb was named an ASWA first-team all-state offensive player for class 6A. As a senior, Webb was named the best offensive guard in the state of Alabama and was a finalist for the AHSAA player of the year. Additionally, Webb was selected to play in the 2019 Under Armour All-America Game and was rated as the 18th best player in the USA Today Sports' Chosen 25. Webb was also rated as a consensus five-star recruit and was rated by ESPN as the number one center in the class of 2019. Webb committed to play college football for the University of Georgia over Alabama, Clemson, and Auburn.

== College career ==
=== Georgia ===
Coming into Georgia, Webb was regarded as an immediate contender for a starting position on the offensive line. Webb enrolled early at Georgia in January 2019 and participated in late-season practices before appearing in four games in the 2019 season. In 2020, Webb played in only three games and did not play in any games during the 2021 season. Nevertheless, Webb was a part of the Georgia team that won the national championship in 2021.

=== Jacksonville State ===
After the 2021 season, Webb transferred to Jacksonville State University, where he would continue playing football. In his first season at Jacksonville State, Webb played in ten games and started seven of them, helping Jacksonville State lead the ASUN in rushing yards. Webb started twelve games the following year, helping the Gamecocks have the fifth-best rushing offense in the FBS. Following the 2023 season, Webb was named a first-team All-American and the best offensive guard in the country by College Football Network and a second-team All-American by the Associated Press. Additionally, Webb was named a second-team All-CUSA player. Entering the 2024 season, Webb was touted as a highly prospective offensive lineman and one of the best-returning linemen in college football. Webb was also named to the preseason watchlist for the Lombardi Award, the Outland Trophy, the USA Today second-team All-American team, and the Walter Camp first-team All-American team. Following the regular season, Webb was named a member of the first-team All-CUSA team.

== Professional career ==
Pre-draft measurables
Height	Weight	Arm length	Hand span	Wingspan	40-yard dash	10-yard split	20-yard split	20-yard shuttle	Three-cone drill	Vertical jump	Broad jump	Bench press
6 ft 3 1/4 in (1.91 m)	312 lb (142 kg)	32 in (0.81 m)	10 in (0.25 m)	6 ft 7 1/2 in (2.02 m)	5.11 s	1.72 s	2.90 s	4.90 s	8.07 s	31.0 in (0.79 m)	8 ft 11 in (2.72 m)	29 reps
All values from NFL Combine/Pro Day

=== Denver Broncos ===
After going unselected in the 2025 NFL draft, Webb signed with the Denver Broncos as an undrafted free agent. He was waived on August 25, 2025.

=== Tennessee Titans ===
On August 27, 2025, Webb signed with the Tennessee Titans' practice squad. He signed a reserve/future contract with Tennessee on January 5, 2026.

On April 30, 2026, Webb was waived by the Titans.

== Legal issues ==
In September 2021, Webb was named a defendant in a federal lawsuit stemming from a bullying incident he was involved in during high school. The lawsuit alleged that Webb and another student coerced the plaintiff into drinking from a Powerade bottle containing Webb's semen.

On April 2, 2025, the lawsuit was dismissed by Alabama circuit judge Timothy C. Burgess on the grounds that there was no sufficient evidence that Webb intended to harm the plaintiff, no physical injury occurred, and the damages were caused by a third party who had stolen the bottle from Webb's locker and taken it into a different locker room.
