= Garrett Dellinger =

American football player (born 2002)

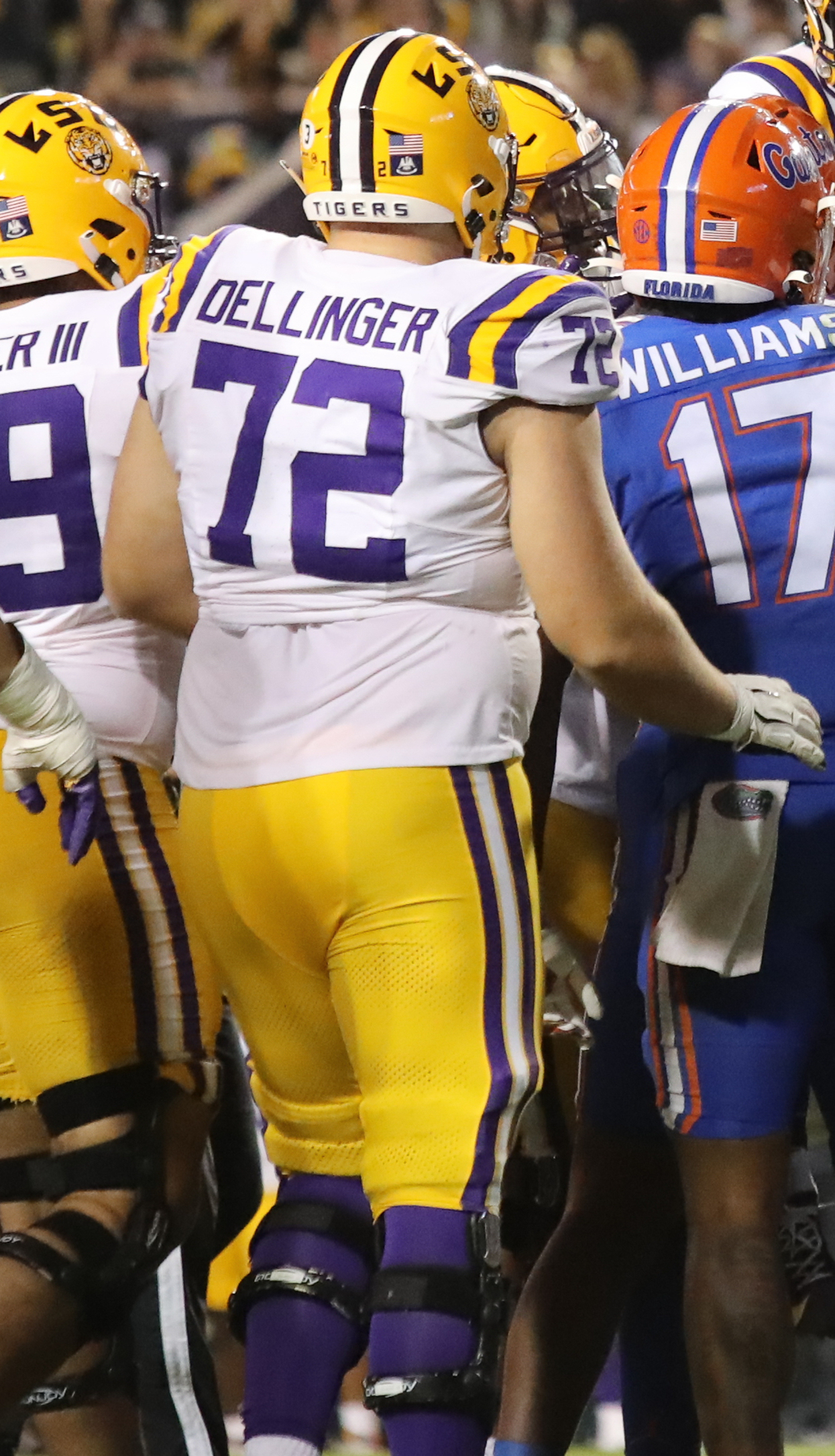
- Dellinger with the LSU Tigers in 2023

No. 71 – Tennessee Titans
- Position: Guard
- Roster status: Active

Personal information
- Born: February 18, 2002 (age 24); Clarkston, Michigan, U.S.
- Listed height: 6 ft 5 in (1.96 m)
- Listed weight: 330 lb (150 kg)

Career information
- High school: Clarkston (MI)
- College: LSU (2021–2024)
- NFL draft: 2025: 7th round, 243rd overall pick

Career history
- Baltimore Ravens (2025)*; Cleveland Browns (2025); Tennessee Titans (2025–present)
- * Offseason or practice squad member only

Career NFL statistics as of 2025
- Games played: 1
- Stats at Pro Football Reference

Garrett Dellinger (born February 18, 2002) is an American professional football guard for the Tennessee Titans of the National Football League (NFL). He played college football for the LSU Tigers and was selected by the Ravens in the seventh round of the 2025 NFL draft.

== Early life ==
Dellinger attended Clarkston High School in Clarkston, Michigan. He was rated as a four-star recruit and committed to play college football for the LSU Tigers over offers from schools such as Michigan, Ohio State, and Penn State.

== College career ==
In four seasons at LSU from 2021 to 2024, Dellinger appeared in 43 games with 31 career starts and was a part of a Joe Moore Award finalist offensive line in 2023. He got his first start as a freshman and became the full time starter in 2023, but missed some time during the 2022 and 2024 seasons with various injuries. He earned an invite to play in the 2025 Reese's Senior Bowl.

== Professional career ==
Pre-draft measurables
Height	Weight	Arm length	Hand span	Wingspan	40-yard dash	10-yard split	20-yard split	20-yard shuttle	Vertical jump	Broad jump	Bench press
6 ft 4 3/8 in (1.94 m)	320 lb (145 kg)	33 in (0.84 m)	9 3/4 in (0.25 m)	6 ft 7 7/8 in (2.03 m)	5.10 s	1.73 s	3.05 s	4.63 s	32.0 in (0.81 m)	9 ft 2 in (2.79 m)	30 reps
All values from Pro Day

=== Baltimore Ravens ===
Dellinger was drafted by the Baltimore Ravens with the 243rd overall pick in the seventh round of the 2025 NFL draft. He was waived on August 26 as part of final roster cuts.

=== Cleveland Browns ===
On August 27, 2025, Dellinger signed with the Cleveland Browns' practice squad. He was promoted to the active roster on December 13, making his NFL debut in the team's Week 15 game against the Chicago Bears. Dellinger was waived by Cleveland on December 15, after Jamari Thrash was re-signed.

=== Tennessee Titans ===
On December 16, 2025, Dellinger was claimed off waivers by the Tennessee Titans. Set to become a exclusive-rights free agent in the offseason, he re-signed with the Titans on March 5, 2026.

On September 11, 2026, Dellinger was waived by the Titans. Four days later, he was re–signed to Tennessee's practice squad. On September 29, he was promoted to the active roster.
