= Cam Jackson (American football) =

American football player (born 2002)

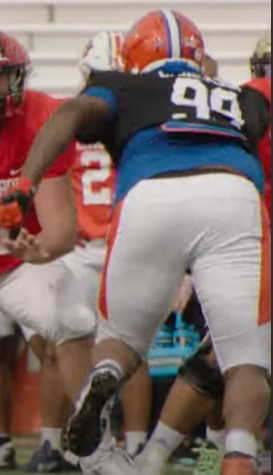
- Jackson at the 2025 Senior Bowl

No. 99 – Carolina Panthers
- Position: Defensive tackle
- Roster status: Injured reserve

Personal information
- Born: August 7, 2002 (age 24)
- Listed height: 6 ft 6 in (1.98 m)
- Listed weight: 340 lb (154 kg)

Career information
- High school: Haynesville (LA)
- College: Memphis (2020–2022); Florida (2023–2024)
- NFL draft: 2025: 5th round, 140th overall pick

Career history
- Carolina Panthers (2025–present)

Career NFL statistics as of 2025
- Total tackles: 9
- Stats at Pro Football Reference

Cam'Ron Jackson (born August 7, 2002) is an American professional football defensive tackle for the Carolina Panthers of the National Football League (NFL). He played college football for the Memphis Tigers and Florida Gators. Jackson was selected by the Panthers in the fifth round of the 2025 NFL draft.

== Early life ==
Jackson attended Haynesville High School in Haynesville, Louisiana. Rated as a four-star recruit, he originally committed to play college football for the LSU Tigers before flipping his commitment to play for the Memphis Tigers.

== College career ==
=== Memphis ===
In his first two collegiate seasons in 2020 and 2021, Jackson appeared in 21 games and totaled ten tackles with 2.5 being for a loss and a sack and a half. In 2022, he notched 41 tackles with three being for a loss and a sack for the Tigers, earning third-team all-American Athletic Conference honors. After the conclusion of the 2022 season, Jackson entered his name into the NCAA transfer portal.

=== Florida ===
Jackson transferred to play for the Florida Gators. In week 3 of the 2023 season, he notched five tackles against Tennessee and was named the co-Southeastern Conference (SEC) defensive lineman of the week. During the 2023 season, Jackson appeared in 11 games and tallied 32 tackles with one being for a loss and two pass deflections.

== Professional career ==
Pre-draft measurables
Height	Weight	Arm length	Hand span	Wingspan	40-yard dash	10-yard split	20-yard split	20-yard shuttle	Vertical jump	Broad jump
6 ft 6 1/4 in (1.99 m)	328 lb (149 kg)	34 1/8 in (0.87 m)	9 1/2 in (0.24 m)	6 ft 9 7/8 in (2.08 m)	5.17 s	1.81 s	3.00 s	4.89 s	24.5 in (0.62 m)	7 ft 9 in (2.36 m)
All values from NFL Combine/Pro Day

Jackson was selected by the Carolina Panthers in the fifth round (140th overall) at the 2025 NFL draft, a selection previously traded to the Panthers by the New York Giants for Brian Burns in the previous offseason.
