= Mac McWilliams =

American football player (born 2001)

No. 22 – Philadelphia Eagles
- Position: Cornerback
- Roster status: Active

Personal information
- Born: November 29, 2001 (age 24)
- Listed height: 5 ft 10 in (1.78 m)
- Listed weight: 191 lb (87 kg)

Career information
- High school: Pine Forest (Pensacola, Florida)
- College: UAB (2020–2023); UCF (2024)
- NFL draft: 2025: 5th round, 145th overall pick

Career history
- Philadelphia Eagles (2025–present)

Career NFL statistics as of 2025
- Tackles: 1
- Stats at Pro Football Reference

Dacarrion "Mac" McWilliams (born November 29, 2001) is an American professional football cornerback for the Philadelphia Eagles of the National Football League (NFL). He played college football for the UAB Blazers and UCF Knights and was selected by the Eagles in the fifth round of the 2025 NFL draft.

== Early life ==
McWilliams grew up in Pensacola, Florida and attended Pine Forest High School. He committed to play college football for the UAB Blazers.

== College career ==
=== UAB ===
As a freshman in 2020, McWilliams appearing in four games and took a redshirt. In 2021, he totaled 24 tackles with three being for a loss, four pass deflections, and a fumble recovery. In 2022, McWilliams notched 19 tackles, ten pass deflections, and an interception, which he returned for a touchdown. In 2023, he started all 12 games for UAB, where he recorded 52 tackles with two being for a loss, nine pass deflections, a forced fumble, and a fumble recovery. After the season, McWilliams entered his name into the NCAA transfer portal.

=== UCF ===
McWilliams transferred to play for the UCF Knights. In his lone season with the Knights in 2024, he tallied 32 tackles with six and a half being for a loss, a sack, two pass deflections, and an interception. After the season, McWilliams declared for the 2025 NFL draft. He accepted an invite to participate in the 2025 Reece's Senior Bowl.

== Professional career ==
Pre-draft measurables
Height	Weight	Arm length	Hand span	Wingspan	40-yard dash	10-yard split	20-yard split	Vertical jump	Bench press
5 ft 10 1/4 in (1.78 m)	191 lb (87 kg)	29 7/8 in (0.76 m)	8 3/8 in (0.21 m)	6 ft 0 5/8 in (1.84 m)	4.41 s	1.52 s	2.58 s	34.0 in (0.86 m)	12 reps
All values from NFL Combine/Pro Day

McWilliams was selected by the Philadelphia Eagles with the 145th overall pick in the fifth round of the 2025 NFL draft.

== Personal life ==
McWilliams played with his older brother, Fish McWilliams a defensive lineman who was a team captain for UAB. His cousin, Rocel played also played as a defensive lineman at South Alabama.
