= Miles Frazier =

American football player (born 2001)

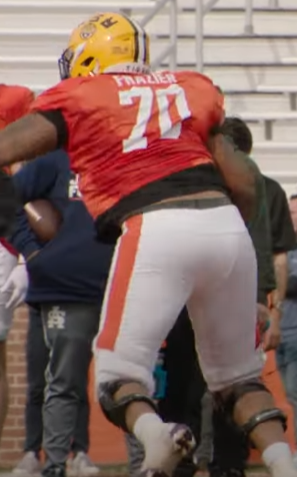
- Frazier with LSU at the 2025 Senior Bowl

No. 71 – Detroit Lions
- Position: Offensive guard
- Roster status: Active

Personal information
- Born: September 12, 2001 (age 25)
- Listed height: 6 ft 6 in (1.98 m)
- Listed weight: 325 lb (147 kg)

Career information
- High school: Milford Academy (New Berlin, New York)
- College: FIU (2020–2021); LSU (2022–2024)
- NFL draft: 2025: 5th round, 171st overall pick

Career history
- Detroit Lions (2025–present)

Awards and highlights
- Freshman All-American (2021)

Career NFL statistics as of Week 9, 2026
- Games played: 13
- Games started: 1
- Stats at Pro Football Reference

Miles Frazier (born September 12, 2001) is an American professional football offensive guard for the Detroit Lions of the National Football League (NFL). He played college football for the FIU Panthers and LSU Tigers and was selected by the Lions in the fifth round of the 2025 NFL draft.

== Early life ==
A native of Camden, New Jersey, Frazier attended Milford Academy in New Berlin, New York. He was rated as a two-star recruit and committed to play college football for the FIU Panthers.

== College career ==
=== FIU ===
During Frazier's two-year career at FIU in 2020 and 2021, he appeared in 13 games for the Panthers where he made 11 starts at offensive tackle, while also earning Freshman All-American honors in 2021. After the conclusion of the 2021 season, Frazier entered his name into the NCAA transfer portal.

=== LSU ===
Frazier transferred to play for the LSU Tigers. In three seasons with the Tigers from 2022 to 2024, he appeared in 40 games, starting 39. Frazier was also a part of a Joe Moore Award finalist offensive line in 2023. He was invited to participate in the 2025 Reese's Senior Bowl.

== Professional career ==
Pre-draft measurables
Height	Weight	Arm length	Hand span	Wingspan	40-yard dash	10-yard split	20-yard split	20-yard shuttle	Three-cone drill	Vertical jump	Broad jump	Bench press
6 ft 5 5/8 in (1.97 m)	317 lb (144 kg)	32 3/4 in (0.83 m)	9 in (0.23 m)	6 ft 9 1/4 in (2.06 m)	5.24 s	1.79 s	3.01 s	4.84 s	7.76 s	31.0 in (0.79 m)	9 ft 0 in (2.74 m)	27 reps
All values from NFL Combine/Pro Day

Frazier was selected in the fifth round, with the 171st pick of the 2025 NFL draft by the Detroit Lions. He began the season on the PUP list due to a knee injury. Frazier was activated on November 26, 2025, ahead of the team's Week 13 matchup against the Green Bay Packers.
