= Carson Vinson =

American football player (born 2001)

No. 76 – Baltimore Ravens
- Position: Offensive tackle
- Roster status: Active

Personal information
- Born: November 13, 2001 (age 24)
- Listed height: 6 ft 7 in (2.01 m)
- Listed weight: 325 lb (147 kg)

Career information
- High school: Panther Creek (Cary, North Carolina)
- College: Alabama A&M (2020–2024)
- NFL draft: 2025: 5th round, 141st overall pick

Career history
- Baltimore Ravens (2025–present)

Awards and highlights
- First-team FCS All-American (2024); First-team All-SWAC (2024)

Career NFL statistics as of Week 6, 2026
- Games played: 12
- Games started: 1
- Stats at Pro Football Reference

Carson Vinson (born November 13, 2001) is an American professional football offensive tackle for the Baltimore Ravens of the National Football League (NFL). He played college football for the Alabama A&M Bulldogs and was selected by the Ravens in the fifth round of the 2025 NFL draft.

== Early life ==
Vinson attended Panther Creek High School in Cary, North Carolina. While in high school, he worked at Five Below. He was rated as a two-star recruit and committed to play college football for the Alabama A&M Bulldogs.

== College career ==
During Vinson's five-year career at Alabama A&M from 2020 through 2024, he started 48 games for the Bulldogs offensive line. In 2024, he earned first-team all-Southwestern Athletic Conference (SWAC) honors and an invitation to the 2025 Reese's Senior Bowl, becoming the first SWAC player to be invited since 2022. Vinson also accepted an invite to participate in the 2025 NFL scouting combine.

== Professional career ==
Pre-draft measurables
Height	Weight	Arm length	Hand span	Wingspan	40-yard dash	10-yard split	20-yard split	20-yard shuttle	Three-cone drill	Vertical jump	Broad jump	Bench press
6 ft 7 1/8 in (2.01 m)	314 lb (142 kg)	34 1/2 in (0.88 m)	10 1/4 in (0.26 m)	7 ft 0 3/8 in (2.14 m)	5.12 s	1.80 s	2.96 s	4.85 s	7.51 s	28.5 in (0.72 m)	9 ft 3 in (2.82 m)	14 reps
All values from NFL Combine/Pro Day

Vinson was selected in the fifth round with the 141st pick of the 2025 NFL draft by the Baltimore Ravens.
