= Caleb Rogers =

American football player (born 2001)

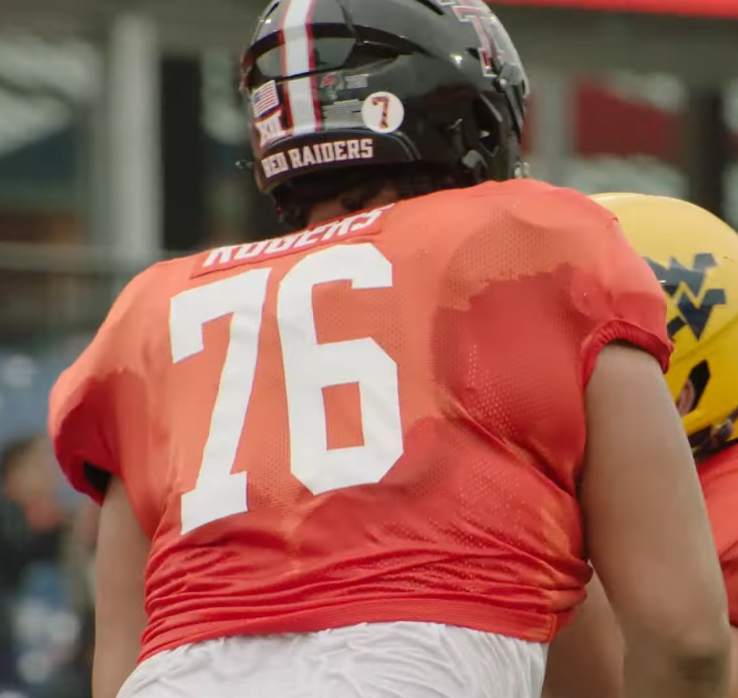
- Rogers at the 2025 Senior Bowl

No. 76 – Las Vegas Raiders
- Position: Guard
- Roster status: Active

Personal information
- Born: October 3, 2001 (age 25)
- Listed height: 6 ft 4 in (1.93 m)
- Listed weight: 312 lb (142 kg)

Career information
- High school: Lake Ridge (Mansfield, Texas)
- College: Texas Tech (2020–2024)
- NFL draft: 2025: 3rd round, 98th overall pick

Career history
- Las Vegas Raiders (2025–present)

Awards and highlights
- Second-team All-Big 12 (2024)

Career NFL statistics as of 2025
- Games played: 6
- Games started: 6
- Stats at Pro Football Reference

Caleb Rogers (born October 3, 2001) is an American professional football guard for the Las Vegas Raiders of the National Football League (NFL). He played college football for the Texas Tech Red Raiders and was selected by the Raiders in the third round of the 2025 NFL draft.

== Early life ==
Rogers attended Lake Ridge High School in Mansfield, Texas. He was rated as a three-star recruit and committed to play college football for the Texas Tech Red Raiders over offers from schools such as Arkansas State, Louisiana Monroe, New Mexico, and William & Mary.

== College career ==
As a freshman in 2020 Rogers appeared in nine games and made three starts. In 2021, he became Texas Tech's full time starting right tackle, making all 13 starts for the Red Raiders. In 2022, Rogers started all 13 games at left tackle. In 2023, he started all 13 games at right tackle. Ahead of the 2024 season, Rogers switched from playing tackle to playing on the interior offensive line and was named a team captain. After the season, Rogers declared for the 2025 NFL draft and accepted an invite to the 2025 Reese's Senior Bowl.

== Professional career ==
Pre-draft measurables
Height	Weight	Arm length	Hand span	Wingspan	40-yard dash	10-yard split	20-yard split	20-yard shuttle	Three-cone drill	Vertical jump	Broad jump	Bench press
6 ft 4 5/8 in (1.95 m)	312 lb (142 kg)	32 3/8 in (0.82 m)	9 3/4 in (0.25 m)	6 ft 7 in (2.01 m)	5.10 s	1.78 s	2.97 s	4.49 s	7.43 s	34.0 in (0.86 m)	9 ft 3 in (2.82 m)	21 reps
All values from NFL Combine/Pro Day

Rogers was selected by the Las Vegas Raiders with the 98th overall pick in the third round of the 2025 NFL draft. He signed a contract with the team on May 8, 2025.
