= Jalen Travis =

American football player (born 2002)

No. 75 – Indianapolis Colts
- Position: Offensive tackle
- Roster status: Active

Personal information
- Born: April 19, 2002 (age 24)
- Listed height: 6 ft 8 in (2.03 m)
- Listed weight: 339 lb (154 kg)

Career information
- High school: DeLaSalle (Minneapolis, Minnesota)
- College: Princeton (2020–2023); Iowa State (2024)
- NFL draft: 2025: 4th round, 127th overall pick

Career history
- Indianapolis Colts (2025–present)

Career NFL statistics as of 2025
- Games played: 17
- Games started: 4
- Stats at Pro Football Reference

Jalen Travis (born April 19, 2002) is an American professional football offensive tackle for the Indianapolis Colts of the National Football League (NFL). He played college football for the Princeton Tigers and Iowa State Cyclones. Travis was selected by the Colts in the fourth round of the 2025 NFL draft.

== Early life ==
Travis attended DeLaSalle High School in Minneapolis, Minnesota. He was rated as a three-star recruit and committed to play college football for the Princeton Tigers. Travis was also previously a congressional intern for Minnesota Senator Amy Klobuchar.

== College career ==
=== Princeton ===
After his freshman season in 2020 was cancelled due to the COVID-19 pandemic, Travis appeared in nine games for the Tigers in 2021. He took over as Princeton's starting left tackle in 2022. In 2023, Travis made six starts for the Tigers before suffering an injury. Regardless, he was named second-team All-Ivy league and was named a Campbell Trophy semifinalist. After the season, Travis entered his name into the NCAA transfer portal so he could get Power 4 experience and potentially reach the NFL.

=== Iowa State ===
Travis transferred to Iowa State University to play for Matt Campbell and the Cyclones. After missing the first two games of the 2024 season with an injury, he took over as the Cyclones starting left tackle. After the season, Travis declared for the 2025 NFL draft and accepted an invite to the 2025 Reese's Senior Bowl.

== Professional career ==
Pre-draft measurables
Height	Weight	Arm length	Hand span	Wingspan	40-yard dash	10-yard split	20-yard split	20-yard shuttle	Three-cone drill	Vertical jump	Broad jump	Bench press
6 ft 7 3/4 in (2.03 m)	339 lb (154 kg)	34 7/8 in (0.89 m)	10 1/2 in (0.27 m)	6 ft 11 1/2 in (2.12 m)	5.14 s	1.80 s	2.96 s	4.94 s	8.08 s	35.0 in (0.89 m)	9 ft 4 in (2.84 m)	26 reps
All values from NFL Combine/Pro Day

Travis was selected in the fourth round (127th pick) by the Indianapolis Colts at the 2025 NFL draft. Upon being drafted 127th, he became the highest drafted Princeton Tigers football player in the modern NFL draft era. He signed a four-year contract with the Colts on May 9, 2025.

== Personal life ==
Travis has two brothers who both played basketball: Reid at Kentucky and Jonah at Harvard. Travis also has two sisters, Olivia who is a basketball coach at Western Illinois, and Grace who played volleyball at St. Mary’s. His cousin, Ross, played basketball at Penn State and played in the NFL.
