= Bilhal Kone =

American football player (born 2002)

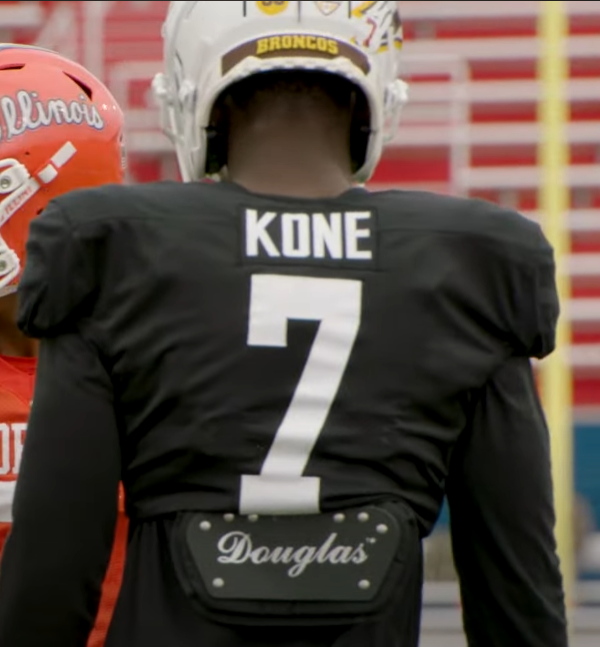
- Kone at the 2025 Senior Bowl

No. 31 – Baltimore Ravens
- Position: Cornerback
- Roster status: Injured reserve

Personal information
- Born: March 3, 2002 (age 24); Minneapolis, Minnesota, U.S.
- Listed height: 6 ft 1 in (1.85 m)
- Listed weight: 190 lb (86 kg)

Career information
- High school: Apple Valley (Apple Valley, Minnesota)
- College: Iowa Central CC (2021); Indiana State (2022); Western Michigan (2023–2024)
- NFL draft: 2025: 6th round, 178th overall pick

Career history
- Baltimore Ravens (2025–present)
- Stats at Pro Football Reference

Bilhal Kone (/bɪˈlɑːl ˈkoʊneɪ/ bih-LAHL KOH-nay; born March 3, 2002) is an American professional football cornerback for the Baltimore Ravens of the National Football League (NFL). He played college football for the Iowa Central Tritons, Indiana State Sycamores, and Western Michigan Broncos. He was selected by the Ravens in the sixth round of the 2025 NFL draft.

== Early life ==
Kone attended Apple Valley High School in Apple Valley, Minnesota, and committed to play college football at Iowa Central Community College. His family is of Ivorian origin, and he was sent to live with his grandmother in the Ivory Coast at one point as a child.

== College career ==
=== Iowa Central CC ===
In two seasons at Iowa Central in 2020 and 2021, Kone recorded 47 tackles and three interceptions, earning consecutive second-team all-conference selections.

=== Indiana State ===
Kone transferred to play at Indiana State. In his lone season at Indiana State in 2022, he recorded 34 tackles, six pass deflections, and a fumble recovery. After the season, Kone entered his name into the NCAA transfer portal.

=== Western Michigan ===
Kone transferred to play at Western Michigan. In two years with the Broncos in 2023 and 2024, he totaled 112 tackles with three being for a loss, 17 pass deflections, and two interceptions. After the 2024 season, Kone entered his name into the 2025 NFL draft and accepted an invite to the 2025 Senior Bowl and to the 2025 NFL Scouting Combine.

== Professional career ==
Pre-draft measurables
Height	Weight	Arm length	Hand span	Wingspan	40-yard dash	10-yard split	20-yard split	20-yard shuttle	Three-cone drill	Vertical jump	Broad jump
6 ft 1 1/4 in (1.86 m)	190 lb (86 kg)	30 7/8 in (0.78 m)	9 in (0.23 m)	6 ft 3 1/2 in (1.92 m)	4.43 s	1.54 s	2.60 s	4.37 s	6.89 s	35.0 in (0.89 m)	10 ft 4 in (3.15 m)
All values from NFL Combine/Pro Day

Kone was selected by the Baltimore Ravens with the 178th overall pick in the sixth round of the 2025 NFL draft. In his first preseason game, Kone tore his MCL and ACL against the Indianapolis Colts, and was placed on season-ending injured reserve.

On August 30, 2026, Kone was placed on injured reserve with a quad injury.
