= Anthony Belton =

American football player (born 2001)

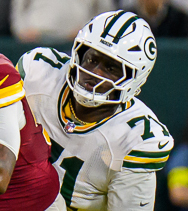
- Belton in 2025

No. 71 – Green Bay Packers
- Position: Offensive tackle
- Roster status: Active

Personal information
- Born: February 23, 2001 (age 25); Tallahassee, Florida, U.S.
- Listed height: 6 ft 6 in (1.98 m)
- Listed weight: 336 lb (152 kg)

Career information
- High school: FSU High (Tallahassee)
- College: Georgia Military College (2019–2020); NC State (2021–2024)
- NFL draft: 2025: 2nd round, 54th overall pick

Career history
- Green Bay Packers (2025–present)

Awards and highlights
- Third-team All-ACC (2023)

Career NFL statistics as of Week 10, 2026
- Games played: 24
- Games started: 15
- Stats at Pro Football Reference

Anthony Belton (born February 23, 2001) is an American professional football offensive tackle for the Green Bay Packers of the National Football League (NFL). He played college football for the Georgia Military Bulldogs and NC State Wolfpack. Belton was selected by the Packers in the second round of the 2025 NFL draft.

== Early life ==
Belton attended Florida State University School in Tallahassee, Florida. Coming out of high school, he was unranked, and he committed to play college football at the JUCO level at Georgia Military College.

== College career ==
=== Georgia Military College ===
In his lone season at Georgia Military College in 2019, Belton played in 11 games. The 2020 season was canceled due to the COVID-19 pandemic.

=== NC State ===
Belton committed to play Division I college football for the NC State Wolfpack. In his first season with the Wolfpack in 2021, he appeared in two games. In 2022, Belton took over as a starter after the departure of Ikem Ekwonu and appeared in all 13 games for the Wolfpack, making eight starts. In 2023, he started all 13 games at left tackle and earned third-team all-ACC honors. In week 4 of the 2024 season versus Clemson, Belton was ejected for spitting on a Clemson player; he was subsequently taken out of the starting lineup the following week versus NIU. Belton made 12 starts in 2024. After the season, Belton declared for the 2025 NFL draft, while also accepting an invite to play in the 2025 Senior Bowl.

== Professional career ==
Pre-draft measurables
Height	Weight	Arm length	Hand span	Wingspan	40-yard dash	10-yard split	20-yard split	20-yard shuttle	Three-cone drill	Vertical jump	Broad jump	Bench press
6 ft 6 in (1.98 m)	335 lb (152 kg)	33 7/8 in (0.86 m)	10 1/4 in (0.26 m)	6 ft 11 1/8 in (2.11 m)	5.26 s	1.82 s	3.04 s	4.69 s	7.77 s	30.0 in (0.76 m)	8 ft 11 in (2.72 m)	20 reps
All values from NFL Combine/Pro Day

Belton was selected by the Green Bay Packers with the 54th overall pick in the second round of the 2025 NFL draft. He signed his rookie contract on July 18, 2025. In Week 2 against the Washington Commanders, he had his first career start.
