= Austin Brinkman =

American football player (born 2002)

No. 40 – Houston Texans
- Position: Long snapper
- Roster status: Active

Personal information
- Born: June 20, 2002 (age 24); Bel Air, Maryland, U.S.
- Listed height: 6 ft 4 in (1.93 m)
- Listed weight: 241 lb (109 kg)

Career information
- High school: John Carroll (Bel Air, Maryland)
- College: West Virginia (2020–2024)
- NFL draft: 2025: undrafted

Career history
- Houston Texans (2025–present)

Career NFL statistics as of Week 8, 2026
- Games played: 24
- Total tackles: 1
- Stats at Pro Football Reference

Austin Brinkman (born June 20, 2002) is an American professional football long snapper for the Houston Texans of the National Football League (NFL). He played college football for the West Virginia Mountaineers and was signed by the Texans as an undrafted free agent in 2025.

== Early life ==
Brinkman is from Bel Air, Maryland. He began playing football and learned long snapping at a young age from his father, who later served as his coach in high school. He attended The John Carroll School, where he played football as a quarterback, defensive back, punter and long snapper. He also competed in basketball, lacrosse and track and field. Brinkman served as John Carroll's long snapper for three seasons and was also named first-team All-Harford as a senior at punter. After high school, he decided to play college football for the West Virginia Mountaineers.

== College career ==
Brinkman redshirted as a true freshman at West Virginia in 2020. He then won the starting long snapper job in 2021 and appeared in all 13 games, being placed on scholarship prior to the last game of the season. Brinkman played in all 12 games in 2022, all 13 games in 2023, and 12 games in 2024. In his last year, he was named third-team All-American by Phil Steele, a semifinalist for the Patrick Mannelly Award as best long snapper nationally, and first-team All-Big 12 Conference by Phil Steele. Brinkman finished his collegiate career having appeared in 50 of the 51 games across his four seasons as a starter. He was also named first-team Academic All-Big 12 in 2021, 2022, 2023, and 2024. He was invited to the 2025 Senior Bowl.

== Professional career ==
Pre-draft measurables
Height	Weight	Arm length	Hand span	Wingspan	40-yard dash	10-yard split	20-yard split	Bench press
6 ft 3 7/8 in (1.93 m)	241 lb (109 kg)	30 3/8 in (0.77 m)	9 3/4 in (0.25 m)	6 ft 2 1/2 in (1.89 m)	5.07 s	1.74 s	2.90 s	13 reps
All values from Pro Day

After going unselected in the 2025 NFL draft, Brinkman signed a three-year contract with the Houston Texans, including $110,000 guaranteed.
