= 2025 Senior Bowl =

American college football all-star game

2025 Reese's Senior Bowl
- 76th Senior Bowl
| National Team | American Team |
| 19 | 22 |
| Head coach: Mike Kafka (Detroit Lions) | Head coach: Bubba Ventrone (Cleveland Browns) |
| | 1 | 2 | 3 | 4 | Total |
|---|---|---|---|---|---|
| National | 8 | 0 | 3 | 8 | 19 |
| American | 0 | 8 | 0 | 14 | 22 |
- Date: February 1, 2025
- Season: 2024
- Stadium: Hancock Whitney Stadium
- Location: Mobile, Alabama
- MVP: Jack Bech (WR, TCU)

United States TV coverage
- Network: NFL Network
- Announcers: Rhett Lewis, Daniel Jeremiah, Charles Davis

The 2025 Senior Bowl was a college football all-star game played on February 1, 2025, at Hancock Whitney Stadium located in Mobile, Alabama. The game featured prospects for the upcoming 2025 draft of the professional National Football League (NFL), mostly coming from the NCAA Division I Football Bowl Subdivision (FBS). It was one of the 2024–25 bowl games concluding the 2024 FBS football season. The game began at approximately 1:30 p.m. Central Time and was officially known as the Reese's Senior Bowl via sponsorship from Reese's Peanut Butter Cups. Television coverage was provided by NFL Network.

== Players ==
=== National team ===
Full roster online .

| No. | Player | Position | HT/WT | College | Notes |
|---|---|---|---|---|---|
| 9 | Darius Alexander | DL | 6'4/311 | Toledo | |
| 24 | LeQuint Allen | RB | 6'0/201 | Syracuse | |
| 80 | Elijah Arroyo | TE | 6'4/245 | Miami (FL) | |
| 23 | Justin Barron | DB | 6'4/225 | Syracuse | |
| 86 | Gavin Bartholomew | TE | 6'5/250 | Pittsburgh | |
| 2 | Jeffrey Bassa | LB | 6'2/235 | Oregon | |
| 71 | Anthony Belton | OL | 6'6/336 | NC State | |
| 74 | Yahya Black | DL | 6'5/317 | Iowa | |
| 3 | Pat Bryant | WR | 6'3/200 | Illinois | |
| 90 | Jamaree Caldwell | DL | 6'1/340 | Oregon | |
| 29 | Sebastian Castro | DB | 5'11/205 | Iowa | |
| 55 | Josh Conerly Jr. | OL | 6'4/315 | Oregon | |
| 26 | Jeremy Crawshaw | P | 6'4/205 | Florida | |
| 7 | Donovan Edwards | RB | 6'1/212 | Michigan | |
| 18 | Taylor Elgersma | QB | 6'6/212 | Wilfrid Laurier (U Sports) | |
| 69 | Aireontae Ersery | OL | 6'6/330 | Minnesota | |
| 44 | Harold Fannin Jr. | TE | 6'4/230 | Bowling Green | |
| 5 | Joshua Farmer | DL | 6'3/318 | Florida State | |
| 5 | Da'Quan Felton | WR | 6'5/216 | Virginia Tech | |
| 19 | Terrance Ferguson | TE | 6'5/255 | Oregon | |
| 14 | Ryan Fitzgerald | K | 6'1/190 | Florida State | |
| 8 | Dillon Gabriel | QB | 6'0/200 | Oregon | |
| 0 | Ollie Gordon II | RB | 6'2/225 | Oklahoma State | |
| 9 | Jayden Higgins | WR | 6'4/215 | Iowa State | |
| 31 | Tommi Hill | DB | 6'0/205 | Nebraska | |
| 25 | Maxen Hook | DB | 6'0/203 | Toledo | |
| 15 | Kobe Hudson | WR | 6'1/200 | UCF | |
| 13 | Keondre Jackson | DB | 6'3/215 | Illinois State | |
| 40 | Landon Jackson | DL | 6'7/280 | Arkansas | |
| 15 | Tez Johnson | WR | 5'10/165 | Oregon | |
| 17 | Jah Joyner | DL | 6'5/265 | Minnesota | |
| 7 | Bilhal Kone | DB | 6'2/190 | Western Michigan | |
| 83 | Jaylin Lane | WR | 5'10/196 | Virginia Tech | |
| 18 | Rayuan Lane III | DB | 5'11/197 | Navy | |
| 45 | Cody Lindenberg | LB | 6'3/240 | Minnesota | |
| 4 | Woody Marks | RB | 5'10/208 | USC | |
| 4 | Nickolas Martin | LB | 6'0/220 | Oklahoma State | |
| 32 | Damien Martinez | RB | 6'0/232 | Miami (FL) | |
| 88 | Moliki Matavao | TE | 6'6/263 | UCLA | |
| 63 | Marcus Mbow | OL | 6'5/300 | Purdue | |
| 74 | Wyatt Milum | OL | 6'6/317 | West Virginia | |
| 70 | Jonah Monheim | OL | 6'5/310 | USC | |
| 12 | Jaylin Noel | WR | 5'11/200 | Iowa State | |
| 99 | Oluwafemi Oladejo | LB | 6'3/250 | UCLA | |
| 30 | Collin Oliver | LB | 6'2/240 | Oklahoma State | |
| 16 | Aeneas Peebles | DL | 6'1/290 | Virginia Tech | |
| 10 | Darien Porter | DB | 6'4/200 | Iowa State | |
| 32 | Karene Reid | LB | 6'0/226 | Utah | |
| 6 | Xavier Restrepo | WR | 5'10/198 | Miami (FL) | |
| 1 | Quincy Riley | DB | 6'0/195 | Louisville | |
| 72 | Jalen Rivers | OL | 6'5/325 | Miami (FL) | |
| 94 | Ty Robinson | DL | 6'6/310 | Nebraska | |
| 76 | Caleb Rogers | OL | 6'5/310 | Texas Tech | |
| 12 | Trey Rucker | DB | 6'0/209 | Oklahoma State | |
| 20 | Jonas Sanker | DB | 6'1/210 | Virginia | |
| 2 | Tyler Shough | QB | 6'5/225 | Louisville | |
| 21 | Jaylin Smith | DB | 5'11/190 | USC | |
| 0 | Josaiah Stewart | DL | 6'1/245 | Michigan | |
| 58 | Junior Tafuna | DL | 6'3/305 | Utah | |
| 8 | Azareye'h Thomas | DB | 6'2/198 | Florida State | |
| 78 | Ozzy Trapilo | OL | 6'8/309 | Boston College | |
| 72 | Jalen Travis | OL | 6'7/340 | Iowa State | |
| 33 | Bhayshul Tuten | RB | 5'11/209 | Virginia Tech | |
| 48 | William Wagner | LS | 6'2/245 | Michigan | |
| 33 | David Walker | LB | 6'2/260 | Central Arkansas | |
| 11 | Kyle Williams | WR | 6'0/186 | Washington State | |
| 77 | Grey Zabel | OL | 6'6/304 | North Dakota State (FCS) | |

=== American team ===
Full roster online .

| No. | Player | Position | HT/WT | College | Notes |
|---|---|---|---|---|---|
| 1 | BJ Adams | DB | 6'3/190 | UCF | |
| 7 | Eugene Asante | LB | 6'1/218 | Auburn | |
| 69 | Jacob Bayer | OL | 6'3/311 | Arkansas State | |
| 7 | Jack Bech | WR | 6'2/215 | TCU | |
| 22 | Billy Bowman Jr. | DB | 5'10/194 | Oklahoma | |
| 19 | Jake Briningstool | TE | 6'6/240 | Clemson | |
| 43 | Austin Brinkman | LS | 6'4/241 | West Virginia | |
| 52 | Logan Brown | OL | 6'6/315 | Kansas | |
| 86 | James Burnip | P | 6'6/236 | Alabama | |
| 2 | Jaxson Dart | QB | 6'2/225 | Ole Miss | |
| 41 | Caden Davis | K | 6'2/210 | Ole Miss | |
| 72 | Garrett Dellinger | OL | 6'5/322 | LSU | |
| 8 | Chimere Dike | WR | 6'0/195 | Florida | |
| 81 | CJ Dippre | TE | 6'5/262 | Alabama | |
| 18 | Johnathan Edwards | DB | 6'1/200 | Tulane | |
| 3 | Trevor Etienne | RB | 5'9/205 | Georgia | |
| 10 | Tai Felton | WR | 6'2/186 | Maryland | |
| 85 | Thomas Fidone II | TE | 6'6/255 | Nebraska | |
| 70 | Miles Frazier | OL | 6'5/325 | LSU | |
| 11 | Maxwell Hairston | DB | 6'1/186 | Kentucky | |
| 22 | RJ Harvey | RB | 5'10/207 | UCF | |
| 87 | Jackson Hawes | TE | 6'5/260 | Georgia Tech | |
| 16 | Seth Henigan | QB | 6'3/215 | Memphis | |
| 27 | Jarquez Hunter | RB | 5'10/209 | Auburn | |
| 93 | Tyrion Ingram-Dawkins | DL | 6'5/280 | Georgia | |
| 15 | Jared Ivey | DL | 6'6/285 | Ole Miss | |
| 37 | Dan Jackson | DB | 6'1/195 | Georgia | |
| 99 | Cam Jackson | DL | 6'6/342 | Florida | |
| 6 | Shemar James | LB | 6'1/229 | Florida | |
| 50 | Emery Jones | OL | 6'6/315 | LSU | |
| 34 | Sai'vion Jones | DL | 6'6/280 | LSU | |
| 20 | Jack Kiser | LB | 6'2/231 | Notre Dame | |
| 17 | Demetrius Knight Jr. | LB | 6'2/245 | South Carolina | |
| 55 | Willie Lampkin | OL | 5'11/290 | North Carolina | |
| 13 | Riley Leonard | QB | 6'4/216 | Notre Dame | |
| 35 | Jalen McLeod | LB | 6'1/236 | Auburn | |
| 27 | Mac McWilliams | DB | 5'10/185 | UCF | |
| 4 | Jalen Milroe | QB | 6'2/225 | Alabama | |
| 32 | Smael Mondon Jr. | LB | 6'3/235 | Georgia | |
| 6 | Devin Neal | RB | 5'11/220 | Kansas | |
| 2 | Walter Nolen | DL | 6'3/305 | Ole Miss | |
| 55 | Omarr Norman-Lott | DL | 6'3/315 | Tennessee | |
| 94 | RJ Oben | DL | 6'3/265 | Notre Dame | |
| 10 | Jacob Parrish | DB | 5'10/198 | Kansas State | |
| 5 | Jamaal Pritchett | WR | 5'8/174 | South Alabama | |
| 13 | Caleb Ransaw | DB | 6'0/196 | Tulane | |
| 17 | Jalen Royals | WR | 6'0/205 | Utah State | |
| 90 | T. J. Sanders | DL | 6'4/291 | South Carolina | |
| 71 | Jonah Savaiinaea | OL | 6'5/336 | Arizona | |
| 67 | Jackson Slater | OL | 6'4/316 | Sacramento State (FCS) | |
| 26 | Melvin Smith Jr. | DB | 6'1/185 | Southern Arkansas (DII) | |
| 5 | Tim Smith | DL | 6'4/313 | Alabama | |
| 0 | Brashard Smith | RB | 5'10/196 | SMU | |
| 11 | Arian Smith | WR | 6'0/185 | Georgia | |
| 4 | Barryn Sorrell | DL | 6'4/260 | Texas | |
| 24 | Upton Stout | DB | 5'9/167 | Western Kentucky | |
| 14 | Danny Striggow | DL | 6'5/255 | Minnesota | |
| 86 | Mason Taylor | TE | 6'5/256 | LSU | |
| 1 | Isaac TeSlaa | WR | 6'4/217 | Arkansas | |
| 12 | Dante Trader Jr. | DB | 5'11/202 | Maryland | |
| 3 | Princely Umanmielen | DL | 6'4/255 | Ole Miss | |
| 76 | Carson Vinson | OL | 6'6/304 | Alabama A&M (FCS) | |
| 0 | Deone Walker | DL | 6'6/345 | Kentucky | |
| 74 | Clay Webb | OL | 6'3/310 | Jacksonville State | |
| 23 | Hunter Wohler | DB | 6'2/218 | Wisconsin | |
| 21 | Marcus Yarns | RB | 5'11/190 | Delaware (FCS) | |
