= Sai'vion Jones =

American football player (born 2003)

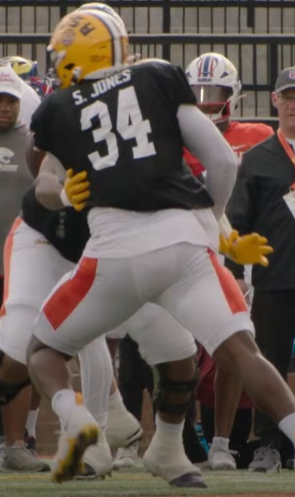
- Jones at the 2025 Senior Bowl

No. 95 – Denver Broncos
- Position: Defensive end
- Roster status: Active

Personal information
- Born: July 3, 2003 (age 23); Vacherie, Louisiana, U.S.
- Listed height: 6 ft 5 in (1.96 m)
- Listed weight: 289 lb (131 kg)

Career information
- High school: St. James (Vacherie, Louisiana)
- College: LSU (2021–2024)
- NFL draft: 2025: 3rd round, 101st overall pick

Career history
- Denver Broncos (2025–present)

Career NFL statistics as of 2025
- Fumble recoveries: 1
- Stats at Pro Football Reference

Sai'vion Jones (born July 3, 2003) is an American professional football defensive end for the Denver Broncos of the National Football League (NFL). He played college football for the LSU Tigers and was selected by the Broncos in the third round of the 2025 NFL draft.

== Early life ==
Jones was born on July 3, 2003 in Vacherie, Louisiana. When Jones was two months old, he was diagnosed with laryngomalacia, a breathing disorder caused by tissue above the vocal chords partially blocking the airway. The condition was severe enough that he needed a tracheotomy tube inserted in his windpipe to breathe properly. One day, after a babysitter noticed that Jones had pulled the tube out of his neck, he was rushed to the hospital where he flatlined two times but was resuscitated after both. Following the incident, Jones spent the first year of his life hooked up to a heart monitor and oxygen machine. Up until middle school, Jones required speech therapy and would only speak to certain people.

Jones attended and played high school football at St. James High School in Vacherie, Louisiana. As a junior, he had 103 tackles and 13 sacks and as a senior, he was the Class 3A MVP and Class 3A Outstanding Defensive Player after recording 75 tackles and 10 sacks. Jones became to the first defensive lineman to receive the Sportsline Player of the Year award. He later committed to Louisiana State University (LSU) to play college football.

== College career ==
As a true freshman at LSU in 2021, Jones played in 11 games and had three tackles. As a sophomore in 2022, he started three of 14 games and recorded 23 tackles and 4.5 sacks. He started all 13 games his junior year in 2023, finishing with 33 tackles and 2.5 sacks. Jones returned to LSU for his senior year in 2024.

== Professional career ==
Pre-draft measurables
Height	Weight	Arm length	Hand span	Wingspan	40-yard dash	10-yard split	20-yard split	Vertical jump	Broad jump	Bench press
6 ft 5 3/8 in (1.97 m)	280 lb (127 kg)	33 1/2 in (0.85 m)	10 in (0.25 m)	6 ft 10 3/8 in (2.09 m)	4.74 s	1.59 s	2.78 s	33.0 in (0.84 m)	9 ft 11 in (3.02 m)	19 reps
All values from NFL Combine/Pro Day

Jones was selected by the Denver Broncos in the third round (101st overall) in the 2025 NFL draft. He made his NFL debut in Week 4 against the Cincinnati Bengals.

== Personal life ==
Jones has had a longtime fascination with bearded dragons, keeping them as pets and bringing them with him during his day-to-day activities.
