= Jalen McLeod =

American football player (born 2002)

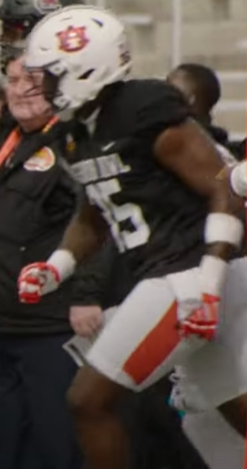
- McLeod at the 2025 Senior Bowl

No. 35 – Jacksonville Jaguars
- Position: Outside linebacker
- Roster status: Active

Personal information
- Born: June 5, 2002 (age 24); Washington, D.C., U.S.
- Listed height: 6 ft 1 in (1.85 m)
- Listed weight: 236 lb (107 kg)

Career information
- High school: Friendship Collegiate Academy (Washington, D.C.)
- College: Appalachian State (2020–2022); Auburn (2023–2024)
- NFL draft: 2025: 6th round, 194th overall pick

Career history
- Jacksonville Jaguars (2025–present)

Career NFL statistics as of Week 3, 2026
- Tackles: 2
- Stats at Pro Football Reference

Jalen McLeod (born June 5, 2002) is an American professional football outside linebacker for the Jacksonville Jaguars of the National Football League (NFL). He played college football for the Appalachian State Mountaineers and Auburn Tigers. He was selected by the Jaguars in the sixth round of the 2025 NFL draft.

== Early life ==
McLeod attended Friendship Collegiate Academy in Washington, D.C., where he was an honorable mention all-metro selection after making 60 tackles and 10 sacks as a senior; he helped the team to the District of Columbia Interscholastic Athletic Association championship in both 2018 and 2019. An outside linebacker, he was ranked a three-star prospect, the 1,640th-best player nationally and the 68th-best recruit at his position by 247Sports. He received relatively little attention as a recruit – having no offers from Power Five teams – and committed to play college football for the Appalachian State Mountaineers, one of only two NCAA Division I FBS programs to give an offer.

== College career ==
McLeod appeared in five games, one as a starter, as a true freshman in 2020, posting nine tackles and two sacks. He then played in all 14 games in 2021 and recorded 26 tackles, a sack, and three tackles-for-loss (TFLs). As a junior in 2022, he posted 41 tackles, six sacks, 7.5 TFLs and two forced fumbles, with both of his forced fumbles coming in an upset win over Texas A&M. He was selected third-team All-Sun Belt Conference (SBC) for his 2022 performance.

McLeod opted to transfer following the 2022 season, concluding his stint with the Mountaineers having made 76 tackles, 12.5 TFLs and three forced fumbles in 30 games played. He ended up transferring to the Auburn Tigers for the 2023 season. With the Tigers that year, he totaled 50 tackles, 10.5 TFLs and 5.5 sacks. As a senior in 2024, he recorded 57 tackles and a team-leading 14 TFLs and eight sacks. He was invited to the 2025 Senior Bowl.

== Professional career ==
Pre-draft measurables
Height	Weight	Arm length	Hand span	Wingspan
6 ft 1 5/8 in (1.87 m)	241 lb (109 kg)	32 1/4 in (0.82 m)	9 3/4 in (0.25 m)	6 ft 8 in (2.03 m)
All values from NFL Combine

McLeod was selected 194th overall in the sixth round in the 2025 NFL draft by the Jacksonville Jaguars.

On August 30, 2026, McLeod was waived by the Jaguars as a part of final roster cuts; he was re-signed to the team's practice squad the next day. On October 10, he was signed to the active roster.
