= Upton Stout =

American football player (born 2002)

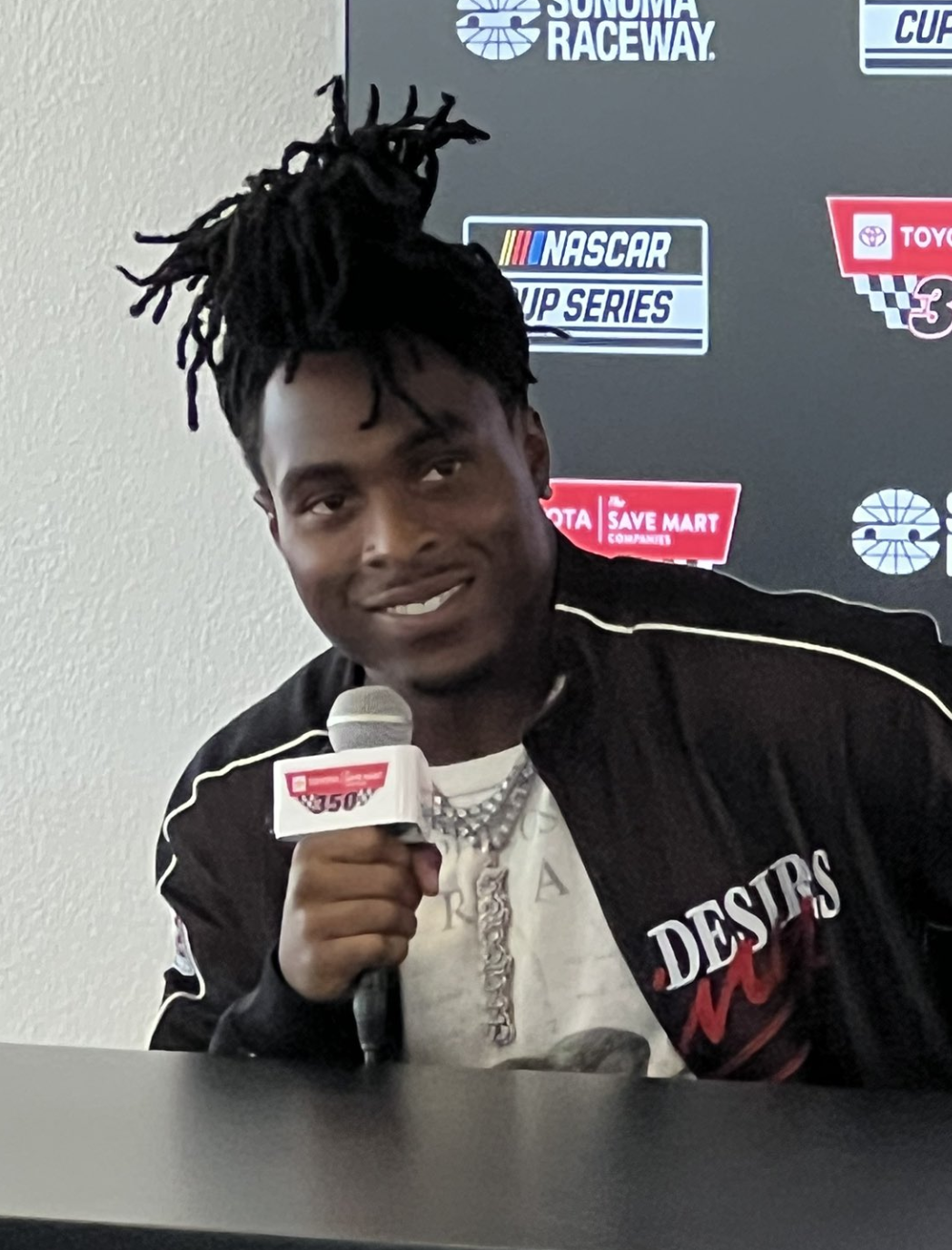
- Stout at Sonoma Raceway in 2026

No. 20 – San Francisco 49ers
- Position: Cornerback
- Roster status: Active

Personal information
- Born: January 9, 2002 (age 24); Houston, Texas, United States
- Listed height: 5 ft 9 in (1.75 m)
- Listed weight: 181 lb (82 kg)

Career information
- High school: North Shore (Houston, Texas)
- College: North Texas (2020–2021); Western Kentucky (2022–2024)
- NFL draft: 2025: 3rd round, 100th overall pick

Career history
- San Francisco 49ers (2025–present)

Awards and highlights
- First-team All-C-USA (2024)

Career NFL statistics as of Week 7, 2026
- Total tackles: 100
- Sacks: 1.5
- Forced fumbles: 1
- Pass deflections: 6
- Stats at Pro Football Reference

Upton Stout III (born January 9, 2002) is an American professional football cornerback for the San Francisco 49ers of the National Football League (NFL). He played college football for the North Texas Mean Green and Western Kentucky Hilltoppers. Stout was selected by the 49ers in the third round of the 2025 NFL draft.

== Early life ==
Stout was born in Houston, Texas. He attended North Shore Senior High School in Houston, where he played cornerback and helped the team win the Texas 6A-1 state championship in 2018 and 2019. A three-star recruit, Stout committed to play college football for the North Texas Mean Green.

== College career ==
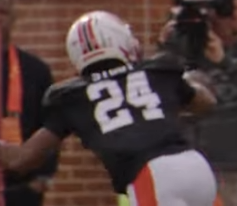
Stout at the 2025 Senior Bowl

Stout became a starter midseason during his freshman year at North Texas in 2020, posting 11 tackles in his first start. He appeared in eight games during the 2020 season and posted 35 total tackles.

Stout then appeared in four games in the 2021 season, totaling six tackles, before redshirting and entering the NCAA transfer portal, eventually committing to the Western Kentucky Hilltoppers.

Stout recorded an interception returned for a touchdown in his Western Kentucky debut and ended up starting 11 games during the 2022 season, posting 44 tackles (sixth on the team) and four interceptions (tied for first on the team).

Stout missed five games due to injury in 2023, ending the season with 29 tackles, eight pass deflections, and an interception returned for a touchdown. He entered the NCAA transfer portal after the season, but later chose to return to the Hilltoppers for the 2024 season.

In 2024, Stout was named first-team All-Conference USA after totaling 52 tackles, 7.5 tackles-for-loss (TFLs), an interception, and a sack. He declared for the 2025 NFL draft and was invited to the Senior Bowl.

== Professional career ==
Pre-draft measurables
Height	Weight	Arm length	Hand span	Wingspan	40-yard dash	10-yard split	20-yard split	20-yard shuttle	Vertical jump	Broad jump	Bench press
5 ft 8 1/2 in (1.74 m)	181 lb (82 kg)	30 in (0.76 m)	9 in (0.23 m)	6 ft 2 3/8 in (1.89 m)	4.44 s	1.51 s	2.59 s	4.29 s	37.5 in (0.95 m)	10 ft 8 in (3.25 m)	21 reps
All values from NFL Combine

=== 2025 season ===
Stout was selected in the third round (100th overall) by the San Francisco 49ers in the 2025 NFL draft.

Stout made his NFL debut during the season-opener against the Seattle Seahawks and finished the 17–13 road victory with a solo tackle and a pass deflection. In the next game against the New Orleans Saints, Stout recorded five combined tackles (four solo) and his first NFL sack during the 26–21 road victory. The following week against the Arizona Cardinals, Stout had five combined tackles (three solo) and a pass deflection in the narrow 16–15 victory. He did not play in Week 7 against the Atlanta Falcons due to an ankle injury.

During Week 8 against the Houston Texans, Stout returned from injury and finished the 26–15 road loss with a season-high nine combined tackles (six solo). Three weeks later against the Cardinals, he had seven combined tackles (two solo) and a forced fumble in the 41–22 road victory. In the next game against the Carolina Panthers on Monday Night Football, Stout recorded six combined tackles (four solo) and a pass deflection during the 20–9 victory. During a Week 16 48–27 road victory over the Indianapolis Colts on Monday Night Football, he had six combined tackles (three solo) and a season-high two pass deflections.

Stout finished his rookie year with 82 combined tackles (43 solo), five pass deflection, a sack, and a forced fumble in 16 games and four starts. The 49ers finished third in the NFC West with a 12–5 record and qualified for the playoffs as the #6-seed. During the Wild Card Round against the Philadelphia Eagles, Stout recorded five combined tackles (three solo) and a pass deflection in the 23–19 road victory. In the Divisional Round against the Seahawks, he had two combined tackles (one solo) during the 41–6 road loss.

=== 2026 season ===
During a Week 2 35–13 victory over the Miami Dolphins, Stout had five combined tackles (two solo), 0.5 sacks, and a pass deflection.

== NFL career statistics ==
=== Regular season ===
Year	Team	Games		Tackles					Interceptions						Fumbles			
Year	Team	GP	GS	Cmb	Solo	Ast	Sack	TFL	PD	Int	Yds	Avg	Lng	TD	FF	FR	Yds	TD
2025	SF	16	4	82	43	39	1.0	4	5	0	0	0.0	0	0	1	0	0	0
2026	SF	6	2	18	11	7	0.5	1	1	0	0	0.0	0	0	0	0	0	0
Career		22	6	100	54	46	1.5	5	6	0	0	0.0	0	0	1	0	0	0

=== Postseason ===
Year	Team	Games		Tackles					Interceptions						Fumbles			
Year	Team	GP	GS	Cmb	Solo	Ast	Sack	TFL	PD	Int	Yds	Avg	Lng	TD	FF	FR	Yds	TD
2025	SF	2	0	7	4	3	0.0	0	1	0	0	0.0	0	0	0	0	0	0
Career		2	0	7	4	3	0.0	0	1	0	0	0.0	0	0	0	0	0	0

== Personal life ==
Stout has his own clothing line, named "Lazy Wayz."
