= 2025 NFL draft =

2025 American football draft

General information
- Date: April 24–26, 2025
- Location: Lambeau Field (Green Bay, Wisconsin)
- Networks: ESPN, ABC, NFL Network, ESPN Deportes, ESPN Radio

Overview
- 257 total selections in 7 rounds
- League: National Football League
- First selection: Cam Ward, QB, Tennessee Titans
- Mr. Irrelevant: Kobee Minor, CB, New England Patriots
- Most selections (11): Baltimore Ravens; Las Vegas Raiders; New England Patriots; San Francisco 49ers; Seattle Seahawks
- Fewest selections (5): Atlanta Falcons; Minnesota Vikings; Washington Commanders

The 2025 NFL draft was the 90th annual meeting of National Football League (NFL) franchises to select newly eligible players. The draft was held at Lambeau Field and its adjacent Titletown District in Green Bay, Wisconsin, on April 24–26, 2025. The Tennessee Titans held the first overall pick and selected Cam Ward, a quarterback from the Miami Hurricanes.

For the first time in the common draft era, (Note: Defined as starting in 1967, when the NFL and the American Football League established a common draft in advance of the two leagues' merger in 1970.) the 2025 draft commenced with all teams holding their original selections in the first round. After the draft had begun, the Jacksonville Jaguars, Cleveland Browns, Philadelphia Eagles, and Kansas City Chiefs traded picks within the first round while the Houston Texans and Los Angeles Rams traded out of the first round. This was the first draft in NFL history to have every player selection come from an NCAA Division I FBS or FCS program.

== Host city ==
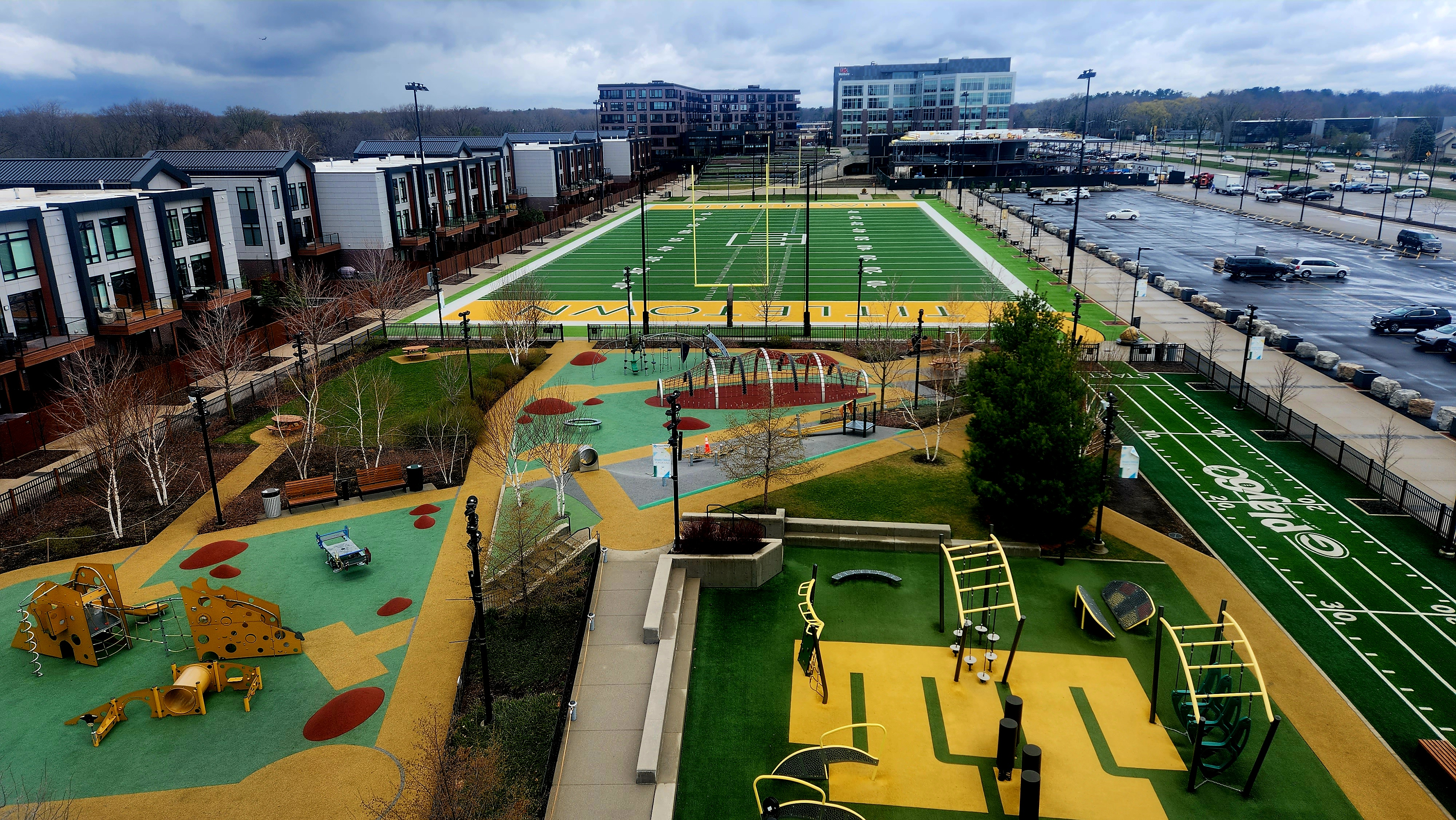
Titletown District (shown here in 2024) hosted the NFL Draft Experience during the 2025 NFL draft.

Green Bay, Wisconsin, was chosen over Washington, D.C. as the host city on May 22, 2023. Ever since the NFL began rotating the location of the NFL draft in 2015, the Packers had pursued hosting it. Although a small town, recent development around Lambeau Field made the location more feasible; this included the development of the Titletown District, the opening of the Resch Expo, and new hotels. Original projections for attendance were 250,000 people, more than double the population of Green Bay. However, actual attendance greatly exceeded that figure, with the NFL estimating about 600,000 attendees over the three-day event, making it one of the most well-attended drafts to date. The event caused significant disruptions to the city, including requiring schools to close for two days, streets to be shut down, hotels almost fully booked, and significant air traffic at Green Bay–Austin Straubel International Airport. The draft stage was built on Oneida Street with Lambeau Field as the backdrop, while the Titletown District hosted the NFL Draft Experience, and the Resch Expo served as a workspace for the media, vendors, and other logistical support. The Packers also opened the Lambeau Field atrium to attendees, which includes the Packers Pro Shop and the Green Bay Packers Hall of Fame.

=== Attendees ===
The following players attended the draft:

- Tyler Booker
- Jihaad Campbell
- Will Campbell
- Matthew Golden
- Mason Graham
- Maxwell Hairston
- Travis Hunter
- Ashton Jeanty
- Will Johnson
- Tetairoa McMillan
- Abdul Carter
- Jalen Milroe
- Barryn Sorrell
- Malaki Starks
- Shemar Stewart
- Shedeur Sanders
- Cam Ward

Although Sorrell was not invited to the draft, he flew to Green Bay with family and friends to attend and stayed all three days. When the Packers selected him in the fourth round, he was announced by Roger Goodell and welcomed on stage like a first-round pick. The Packers' staff did not know he was in attendance when they sent in the pick, Also Troy Vincent also didn’t make it to the stage for the first time since 2013.

== Player selections ==
| * | Compensatory selection |
| × | Resolution JC-2A selection |
| † | Pro Bowler (Note: Players are identified as Pro Bowlers if they were selected for the Pro Bowl at any time in their career.) |

Positions key
| Offense | Defense | Special teams |
|---|---|---|
| QB — Quarterback; RB — Running back; FB — Fullback; WR — Wide receiver; TE — Tight end; OL — Offensive lineman; T — Tackle; G — Guard; C — Center | DL — Defensive lineman; DT — Defensive tackle (Note: Includes nose tackle (NT)); DE — Defensive end; EDGE — Edge rusher; LB — Linebacker (Note: Includes middle linebacker (MLB/MIKE), weakside linebacker (WILL), strongside linebacker (SAM), off-ball linebacker, and outside linebacker (OLB)); DB — Defensive back; CB — Cornerback; S — Safety (Note: Includes free safety (FS) and strong safety (SS)) | K — Kicker (Note: Also known as a placekicker (PK)); P — Punter; LS — Long snapper; RS — Return specialist (Note: Includes kickoff and punt returners) |

| Rnd. | Pick | Team | Player | Pos. | College | Notes |
|---|---|---|---|---|---|---|
| 1 | 1 | Tennessee Titans | Cam Ward | QB | Miami (FL) | 2024 Davey O'Brien Award winner |
| 1 | 2 | Jacksonville Jaguars | Travis Hunter | CB/WR | Colorado | 2024 Heisman Trophy winner; from Cleveland (Note: No. 2: Cleveland → Jacksonville (D). Cleveland traded first-, fourth- and sixth-round selections (2nd, 104th and 200th overall) to Jacksonville in exchange for first-, second- and fourth-round selections (5th, 36th and 126th overall) and a 2026 first-round selection.) |
| 1 | 3 | New York Giants | Abdul Carter | DE | Penn State | |
| 1 | 4 | New England Patriots | Will Campbell | T | LSU | |
| 1 | 5 | Cleveland Browns | Mason Graham | DT | Michigan | from Jacksonville (Note: No. 5: Jacksonville → Cleveland (D). See Round 1: Cleveland → Jacksonville.) |
| 1 | 6 | Las Vegas Raiders | Ashton Jeanty | RB | Boise State | 2024 Maxwell Award winner |
| 1 | 7 | New York Jets | Armand Membou | T | Missouri | |
| 1 | 8 | Carolina Panthers | Tetairoa McMillan | WR | Arizona | |
| 1 | 9 | New Orleans Saints | Kelvin Banks Jr. | T | Texas | 2024 Lombardi Award winner |
| 1 | 10 | Chicago Bears | Colston Loveland | TE | Michigan | |
| 1 | 11 | San Francisco 49ers | Mykel Williams | DE | Georgia | |
| 1 | 12 | Dallas Cowboys | Tyler Booker | G | Alabama | |
| 1 | 13 | Miami Dolphins | Kenneth Grant | DT | Michigan | |
| 1 | 14 | Indianapolis Colts | Tyler Warren ^{†} | TE | Penn State | 2024 John Mackey Award winner |
| 1 | 15 | Atlanta Falcons | Jalon Walker | LB | Georgia | 2024 Dick Butkus Award winner |
| 1 | 16 | Arizona Cardinals | Walter Nolen | DT | Ole Miss | |
| 1 | 17 | Cincinnati Bengals | Shemar Stewart | DE | Texas A&M | |
| 1 | 18 | Seattle Seahawks | Grey Zabel | G | North Dakota State | |
| 1 | 19 | Tampa Bay Buccaneers | Emeka Egbuka | WR | Ohio State | |
| 1 | 20 | Denver Broncos | Jahdae Barron | CB | Texas | 2024 Jim Thorpe Award winner |
| 1 | 21 | Pittsburgh Steelers | Derrick Harmon | DT | Oregon | |
| 1 | 22 | Los Angeles Chargers | Omarion Hampton | RB | North Carolina | |
| 1 | 23 | Green Bay Packers | Matthew Golden | WR | Texas | |
| 1 | 24 | Minnesota Vikings | Donovan Jackson | G | Ohio State | |
| 1 | 25 | New York Giants | Jaxson Dart | QB | Ole Miss | from Houston (Note: No. 25: Houston → NY Giants (D). Houston traded a first-round selection (25th overall) to the NY Giants in exchange for second- and third-round selections (34th and 99th overall) and a 2026 third-round selection.) |
| 1 | 26 | Atlanta Falcons | James Pearce Jr. | DE | Tennessee | from LA Rams (Note: No. 26: LA Rams → Atlanta (D). LA Rams traded first- and third-round selections (26th and 101st overall) to Atlanta in exchange for second- and seventh-round selections (46th and 242th overall), and a 2026 first-round selection.) |
| 1 | 27 | Baltimore Ravens | Malaki Starks | S | Georgia | |
| 1 | 28 | Detroit Lions | Tyleik Williams | DT | Ohio State | |
| 1 | 29 | Washington Commanders | Josh Conerly Jr. | T | Oregon | |
| 1 | 30 | Buffalo Bills | Maxwell Hairston | CB | Kentucky | |
| 1 | 31 | Philadelphia Eagles | Jihaad Campbell | LB | Alabama | from Kansas City (Note: No. 31: Kansas City → Philadelphia (D). Kansas City traded a first-round selection (31st overall) to Philadelphia in exchange for first- and fifth-round selections (32nd and 164th overall).) |
| 1 | 32 | Kansas City Chiefs | Josh Simmons | T | Ohio State | from Philadelphia (Note: No. 32: Philadelphia → Kansas City (D). See Round 1: Kansas City → Philadelphia.) |
| 2 | 33 | Cleveland Browns | Carson Schwesinger | LB | UCLA | |
| 2 | 34 | Houston Texans | Jayden Higgins | WR | Iowa State | from NY Giants (Note: No. 34: NY Giants → Houston (D). See Round 1: Houston → NY Giants.) |
| 2 | 35 | Seattle Seahawks | Nick Emmanwori | S | South Carolina | from Tennessee (Note: No. 35: Tennessee → Seattle (D). Tennessee traded a second-round selection (35th overall) to Seattle in exchange for second- and third-round selections (52nd and 82nd overall).) |
| 2 | 36 | Cleveland Browns | Quinshon Judkins | RB | Ohio State | from Jacksonville (Note: No. 36: Jacksonville → Cleveland (D). See Round 1: Cleveland → Jacksonville.) |
| 2 | 37 | Miami Dolphins | Jonah Savaiinaea | G | Arizona | from Las Vegas (Note: No. 37: Las Vegas → Miami (D). Las Vegas traded second- and fifth-round selections (37th and 143rd overall) to Miami in exchange for second-, third- and fourth-round selections (48th, 98th and 135th overall).) |
| 2 | 38 | New England Patriots | TreVeyon Henderson | RB | Ohio State | |
| 2 | 39 | Chicago Bears | Luther Burden III | WR | Missouri | from Carolina (Note: No. 39: Carolina → Chicago (PD). Carolina traded a second-round selection (39th overall), 2023 first- and second-round selections, a 2024 first-round selection and WR D. J. Moore to Chicago in exchange for a 2023 first-round selection.) |
| 2 | 40 | New Orleans Saints | Tyler Shough | QB | Louisville | |
| 2 | 41 | Buffalo Bills | T. J. Sanders | DT | South Carolina | from Chicago (Note: No. 41: Chicago → Buffalo (D). Chicago traded second-, third- and seventh-round selections (41st, 72nd and 240th overall) to Buffalo in exchange for two second-round selections and a fourth-round selection (56th, 62nd and 109th overall).) |
| 2 | 42 | New York Jets | Mason Taylor | TE | LSU | |
| 2 | 43 | San Francisco 49ers | Alfred Collins | DT | Texas | |
| 2 | 44 | Dallas Cowboys | Donovan Ezeiruaku | DE | Boston College | 2024 Ted Hendricks Award winner |
| 2 | 45 | Indianapolis Colts | JT Tuimoloau | DE | Ohio State | |
| 2 | 46 | Los Angeles Rams | Terrance Ferguson | TE | Oregon | from Atlanta (Note: No. 46: Atlanta → LA Rams (D). See Round 1: LA Rams → Atlanta.) |
| 2 | 47 | Arizona Cardinals | Will Johnson | CB | Michigan | |
| 2 | 48 | Houston Texans | Aireontae Ersery | T | Minnesota | from Miami via Las Vegas (Note: No. 48: Miami → Las Vegas → Houston. Multiple trades: Miami → Las Vegas (D). See Round 2: Las Vegas → Miami. Las Vegas → Houston (D). Las Vegas traded a second-round selection (48th overall) to Houston in exchange for second- and third-round selections (58th and 99th overall).) |
| 2 | 49 | Cincinnati Bengals | Demetrius Knight | LB | South Carolina | |
| 2 | 50 | Seattle Seahawks | Elijah Arroyo | TE | Miami (FL) | |
| 2 | 51 | Carolina Panthers | Nic Scourton | DE | Texas A&M | from Denver (Note: No. 51: Denver → Carolina (D). Denver traded second-, third-, fourth- and sixth-round selections (51st, 85th, 122nd and 208th overall) to Carolina in exchange for second-, third-, fourth- and seventh-round selections (57th, 74th, 111th and 230th overall).) |
| 2 | 52 | Tennessee Titans | Oluwafemi Oladejo | DE | UCLA | from Pittsburgh via Seattle (Note: No. 52: Pittsburgh → Seattle → Tennessee. Multiple trades: Pittsburgh → Seattle (PD). Pittsburgh traded second- and seventh-round selections (52nd and 223rd overall) to Seattle in exchange for a sixth-round selection (185th overall) and WR DK Metcalf. Seattle → Tennessee (D). See Round 2: Tennessee → Seattle.) |
| 2 | 53 | Tampa Bay Buccaneers | Benjamin Morrison | CB | Notre Dame | |
| 2 | 54 | Green Bay Packers | Anthony Belton | T | NC State | |
| 2 | 55 | Los Angeles Chargers | Tre Harris | WR | Ole Miss | |
| 2 | 56 | Chicago Bears | Ozzy Trapilo | T | Boston College | from Minnesota via Houston and Buffalo (Note: No. 56: Minnesota → Houston → Buffalo → Chicago. Multiple trades: Minnesota → Houston (PD). Minnesota traded a second-round selection (56th overall), and 2024 second- and sixth-round selections to Houston in exchange for 2024 first- and seventh-round selections. Houston → Buffalo (PD). Houston traded a second-round selection (56th overall) to Buffalo in exchange for a fifth-round selection (166th overall), a 2024 sixth-round selection and WR Stefon Diggs. Buffalo → Chicago (D). See Round 2: Chicago → Buffalo.) |
| 2 | 57 | Detroit Lions | Tate Ratledge | G | Georgia | from LA Rams via Carolina and Denver (Note: No. 57: LA Rams → Carolina → Denver → Detroit. Multiple trades: LA Rams → Carolina (PD). LA Rams traded a second-round selection (57th overall), and 2024 second- and fifth-round selections to Carolina in exchange for a 2024 second-round selection. Carolina → Denver (D). See Round 2: Denver → Carolina. Denver → Detroit (D). Denver traded second- and seventh-round selections (57th and 230th overall) to Detroit in exchange for second- and fourth-round selections (60th and 130th overall).) |
| 2 | 58 | Las Vegas Raiders | Jack Bech | WR | TCU | from Houston (Note: No. 58: Houston → Las Vegas (D). See Round 2: Las Vegas → Houston.) |
| 2 | 59 | Baltimore Ravens | Mike Green | LB | Marshall | |
| 2 | 60 | Denver Broncos | RJ Harvey | RB | UCF | from Detroit (Note: No. 60: Detroit → Denver (D). See Round 2: Denver → Detroit.) |
| 2 | 61 | Washington Commanders | Trey Amos | CB | Ole Miss | |
| 2 | 62 | Chicago Bears | Shemar Turner | DT | Texas A&M | from Buffalo (Note: No. 62: Buffalo → Chicago (D). See Round 2: Chicago → Buffalo.) |
| 2 | 63 | Kansas City Chiefs | Omarr Norman-Lott | DT | Tennessee | |
| 2 | 64 | Philadelphia Eagles | Andrew Mukuba | S | Texas | |
| 3 | 65 | New York Giants | Darius Alexander | DT | Toledo | |
| 3 | 66 | Kansas City Chiefs | Ashton Gillotte | DE | Louisville | from Tennessee (Note: No. 66: Tennessee → Kansas City (PD). Tennessee traded a third-round selection (66th overall) and a 2024 seventh-round selection to Kansas City in exchange for a 2024 seventh-round selection and CB L'Jarius Sneed.) |
| 3 | 67 | Cleveland Browns | Harold Fannin Jr. | TE | Bowling Green | |
| 3 | 68 | Las Vegas Raiders | Darien Porter | CB | Iowa State | |
| 3 | 69 | New England Patriots | Kyle Williams | WR | Washington State | |
| 3 | 70 | Detroit Lions | Isaac TeSlaa | WR | Arkansas | from Jacksonville (Note: No. 70: Jacksonville → Detroit (D). Jacksonville traded third- and sixth-round selections (70th and 182nd overall), and a 2026 sixth-round selection to Detroit in exchange for a third-round selection (102nd overall) and two 2026 third-round selections.) |
| 3 | 71 | New Orleans Saints | Vernon Broughton | DT | Texas | |
| 3 | 72 | Buffalo Bills | Landon Jackson | DE | Arkansas | from Chicago (Note: No. 72: Chicago → Buffalo (D). See Round 2: Chicago → Buffalo.) |
| 3 | 73 | New York Jets | Azareye'h Thomas | CB | Florida State | |
| 3 | 74 | Denver Broncos | Pat Bryant | WR | Illinois | from Carolina (Note: No. 74: Carolina → Denver (D). See Round 2: Denver → Carolina.) |
| 3 | 75 | San Francisco 49ers | Nick Martin | LB | Oklahoma State | |
| 3 | 76 | Dallas Cowboys | Shavon Revel | CB | East Carolina | |
| 3 | 77 | Carolina Panthers | Princely Umanmielen | DE | Ole Miss | from Atlanta via New England (Note: No. 77: Atlanta → New England → Carolina. Multiple trades: Atlanta → New England (PD). Atlanta traded a third-round selection (77th overall) to New England in exchange for LB Matthew Judon. New England → Carolina (D). New England traded a third-round selection (77th overall) to Carolina in exchange for third- and fifth-round selections (85th and 146th overall).) |
| 3 | 78 | Arizona Cardinals | Jordan Burch | DE | Oregon | |
| 3 | 79 | Houston Texans | Jaylin Noel | WR | Iowa State | from Miami via Philadelphia and Washington (Note: No. 79: Miami → Philadelphia → Washington → Houston. Multiple trades: Miami → Philadelphia (PD). Miami traded a third-round selection (79th overall) to Philadelphia in exchange for a 2024 fourth-round selection (120th overall). Philadelphia → Washington (PD). Philadelphia traded a conditional third-round selection and two seventh-round selections (79th, 236th and 248th overall) to Washington in exchange for a fifth-round selection (165th overall) and WR Jahan Dotson. The condition – that Washington would receive the higher of Miami or Philadelphia's third-round selection in 2025 – was converted on December 8, 2024, when the Eagles clinched a playoff spot, ensuring the Dolphins' pick was higher than the Eagles' own. Washington → Houston (PD). Washington traded third- and seventh-round selections (79th and 236th overall), and 2026 second- and fourth-round selections to Houston in exchange for a fourth-round selection (128th overall) and T Laremy Tunsil.) |
| 3 | 80 | Indianapolis Colts | Justin Walley | CB | Minnesota | |
| 3 | 81 | Cincinnati Bengals | Dylan Fairchild | G | Georgia | |
| 3 | 82 | Tennessee Titans | Kevin Winston Jr. | S | Penn State | from Seattle (Note: No. 82: Seattle → Tennessee (D). See Round 2: Tennessee → Seattle.) |
| 3 | 83 | Pittsburgh Steelers | Kaleb Johnson | RB | Iowa | |
| 3 | 84 | Tampa Bay Buccaneers | Jacob Parrish | CB | Kansas State | |
| 3 | 85 | Kansas City Chiefs | Nohl Williams | CB | California | from Denver via Carolina and New England (Note: No. 85: Denver → Carolina → New England → Kansas City. Multiple trades: Denver → Carolina (D). See Round 2: Denver → Carolina. Carolina → New England (D). See Round 3: New England → Carolina. New England → Kansas City (D). New England traded a third-round selection (85th overall) to Kansas City in exchange for a third-round selection (95th overall) and a 2026 fourth-round selection.) |
| 3 | 86 | Los Angeles Chargers | Jamaree Caldwell | DT | Oregon | |
| 3 | 87 | Green Bay Packers | Savion Williams | WR | TCU | |
| 3 | 88 | Jacksonville Jaguars | Caleb Ransaw | CB | Tulane | from Minnesota (Note: No. 88: Minnesota → Jacksonville (PD). Minnesota traded third- and fourth-round selections (88th and 126th overall), and 2024 first- and fifth-round selections to Jacksonville in exchange for a 2024 first-round selection.) |
| 3 | 89 | Jacksonville Jaguars | Wyatt Milum | G | West Virginia | from Houston (Note: No. 89: Houston → Jacksonville (D). Houston traded third- and seventh-round selections (89th and 236th overall) to Jacksonville in exchange for third- and fourth-round selections (102nd and 142nd overall).) |
| 3 | 90 | Los Angeles Rams | Josaiah Stewart | DE | Michigan | |
| 3 | 91 | Baltimore Ravens | Emery Jones Jr. | T | LSU | |
| 3 | 92 | Seattle Seahawks | Jalen Milroe | QB | Alabama | 2024 William V. Campbell Trophy winner; from Detroit via NY Jets and Las Vegas (Note: No. 92: Detroit → NY Jets → Las Vegas → Seattle (PD). Multiple trades: Detroit → NY Jets (PD). Detroit traded a third-round selection (92nd overall) to the NY Jets in exchange for a 2024 fourth-round selection. NY Jets → Las Vegas (PD). NY Jets traded a conditional third-round selection (92nd overall) to Las Vegas for WR Davante Adams. Las Vegas would have received a second-round selection in 2025 if Adams was named to the 2024 All-Pro Team or if Adams was designated an active player for the NY Jets in the AFC Championship Game or Super Bowl LIX. Neither of those conditions were met and Las Vegas received this pick instead. Las Vegas → Seattle (PD). Las Vegas traded a third-round selection (92nd overall) to Seattle in exchange for QB Geno Smith.) |
| 3 | 93 | New Orleans Saints | Jonas Sanker | S | Virginia | from Washington (Note: No. 93: Washington → New Orleans (PD). Washington traded third-, fourth- and sixth-round selections (93rd, 131st and 184th overall) to New Orleans in exchange for a fifth-round selection (147th overall) and CB Marshon Lattimore.) |
| 3 | 94 | Cleveland Browns | Dillon Gabriel | QB | Oregon | from Buffalo (Note: No. 94: Buffalo → Cleveland (PD). Buffalo traded a third-round selection (94th overall) and a 2026 seventh-round selection to Cleveland in exchange for a sixth-round selection (204th overall) and WR Amari Cooper.) |
| 3 | 95 | New England Patriots | Jared Wilson | C | Georgia | from Kansas City (Note: No. 95: Kansas City → New England (D). See Round 3: New England → Kansas City.) |
| 3 | 96 | Atlanta Falcons | Xavier Watts | S | Notre Dame | 2023 Bronko Nagurski Trophy winner; from Philadelphia (Note: No. 96: Philadelphia → Atlanta (D). Philadelphia traded a third-round selection (96th overall) to Atlanta in exchange for a third-round selection (101st overall) and a 2026 fifth-round selection.) |
| 3* | 97 | Houston Texans | Jaylin Smith | CB | USC | from Minnesota (Note: No. 97: Minnesota → Houston (D). Minnesota traded third- and sixth-round selections (97th and 187th overall) to Houston in exchange for third- and fourth-round selections (102nd and 142nd overall).) |
| 3* | 98 | Las Vegas Raiders | Caleb Rogers | G | Texas Tech | from Miami (Note: No. 98: Miami → Las Vegas (D). See Round 2: Las Vegas → Miami.) |
| 3* | 99 | Las Vegas Raiders | Charles Grant | T | William & Mary | from NY Giants via Houston (Note: No. 99: NY Giants → Houston → Las Vegas. Multiple trades: NY Giants → Houston (D). See Round 1: Houston → NY Giants. Houston → Las Vegas (D). See Round 2: Las Vegas → Houston.) |
| 3× | 100 | San Francisco 49ers | Upton Stout | CB | Western Kentucky | Resolution JC-2A selection (Note: San Francisco received a third-round selection (100th overall) as compensation for Houston hiring defensive coordinator DeMeco Ryans as head coach.) |
| 3× | 101 | Denver Broncos | Sai'vion Jones | DE | LSU | Resolution JC-2A selection, (Note: The LA Rams received a third-round selection (101st overall) as compensation for Atlanta hiring defensive coordinator Raheem Morris as head coach.) from LA Rams via Atlanta and Philadelphia (Note: No. 101: LA Rams → Atlanta → Philadelphia → Denver. Multiple trades: LA Rams → Atlanta (D). See Round 1: LA Rams → Atlanta. Atlanta → Philadelphia (D). See Round 3: Philadelphia → Atlanta. Philadelphia → Denver (D). Philadelphia traded third- and fourth-round selections (101st and 134th overall) to Denver in exchange for two fourth-round selections and a sixth-round selection (111th, 130th and 191st overall).) |
| 3× | 102 | Minnesota Vikings | Tai Felton | WR | Maryland | Resolution JC-2A selection, (Note: Detroit received a third-round selection (102nd overall) as compensation for the NY Jets hiring defensive coordinator Aaron Glenn as head coach.) from Detroit via Jacksonville and Houston (Note: No. 102: Detroit → Jacksonville → Houston → Minnesota. Multiple trades: Detroit → Jacksonville (D). See Round 3: Jacksonville → Detroit. Jacksonville → Houston (D). See Round 3: Houston → Jacksonville. Houston → Minnesota (D). See Round 3: Minnesota → Houston.) |
| 4 | 103 | Tennessee Titans | Chimere Dike ^{†} | WR | Florida | |
| 4 | 104 | Jacksonville Jaguars | Bhayshul Tuten | RB | Virginia Tech | from Cleveland (Note: No. 104: Cleveland → Jacksonville (D). See Round 1: Cleveland → Jacksonville.) |
| 4 | 105 | New York Giants | Cam Skattebo | RB | Arizona State | |
| 4 | 106 | New England Patriots | Craig Woodson | S | California | |
| 4 | 107 | Jacksonville Jaguars | Jack Kiser | LB | Notre Dame | |
| 4 | 108 | Las Vegas Raiders | Dont'e Thornton | WR | Tennessee | |
| 4 | 109 | Buffalo Bills | Deone Walker | DT | Kentucky | from Chicago via Buffalo and Chicago (Note: No. 109: Chicago → Buffalo → Chicago → Buffalo. Multiple trades: Chicago → Buffalo (PD). Chicago traded a fourth-round selection (109th overall) to Buffalo in exchange for a 2024 fifth-round selection. Buffalo → Chicago (D). See Round 2: Chicago → Buffalo. Chicago → Buffalo (D). Chicago traded a fourth-round selection (109th overall) to Buffalo in exchange for fourth- and fifth-round selections (132nd and 169th overall).) |
| 4 | 110 | New York Jets | Arian Smith | WR | Georgia | |
| 4 | 111 | Philadelphia Eagles | Ty Robinson | DT | Nebraska | from Carolina via Denver (Note: No. 111: Carolina → Denver → Philadelphia. Multiple trades: Carolina → Denver (D). See Round 2: Denver → Carolina. Denver → Philadelphia (D). See Round 3: Philadelphia → Denver.) |
| 4 | 112 | New Orleans Saints | Danny Stutsman | LB | Oklahoma | |
| 4 | 113 | San Francisco 49ers | CJ West | DT | Indiana | |
| 4 | 114 | Carolina Panthers | Trevor Etienne | RB | Georgia | from Dallas (Note: No. 114: Dallas → Carolina (PD). Dallas traded a fourth-round selection (114th overall) to Carolina in exchange for a seventh-round selection (247th overall) and WR Jonathan Mingo.) |
| 4 | 115 | Arizona Cardinals | Cody Simon | LB | Ohio State | |
| 4 | 116 | Houston Texans | Woody Marks | RB | USC | from Miami (Note: No. 116: Miami → Houston (D). Miami traded fourth- and seventh-round selections (116th and 224th overall) to Houston in exchange for a sixth-round selection (179th overall) and a 2026 third-round selection.) |
| 4 | 117 | Los Angeles Rams | Jarquez Hunter | RB | Auburn | from Indianapolis (Note: No. 117: Indianapolis → LA Rams (D). Indianapolis traded a fourth-round selection (117th) to the LA Rams in exchange for fourth- and sixth-round selections (127th and 190th overall).) |
| 4 | 118 | Atlanta Falcons | Billy Bowman Jr. | S | Oklahoma | |
| 4 | 119 | Cincinnati Bengals | Barrett Carter | LB | Clemson | |
| 4 | 120 | Tennessee Titans | Gunnar Helm | TE | Texas | from Seattle (Note: No. 120: Seattle → Tennessee (PD). Seattle traded a fourth-round selection (120th overall) and LB Jerome Baker to Tennessee in exchange for LB Ernest Jones.) |
| 4 | 121 | Tampa Bay Buccaneers | David Walker | LB | Central Arkansas | |
| 4 | 122 | Carolina Panthers | Lathan Ransom | S | Ohio State | from Denver (Note: No. 122: Denver → Carolina (D). See Round 2: Denver → Carolina.) |
| 4 | 123 | Pittsburgh Steelers | Jack Sawyer | DE | Ohio State | |
| 4 | 124 | Green Bay Packers | Barryn Sorrell | DE | Texas | |
| 4 | 125 | Los Angeles Chargers | Kyle Kennard | LB | South Carolina | 2024 Bronko Nagurski Trophy winner |
| 4 | 126 | Cleveland Browns | Dylan Sampson | RB | Tennessee | from Minnesota via Jacksonville (Note: No. 126: Minnesota → Jacksonville → Cleveland. Multiple trades: Minnesota → Jacksonville (PD). See Round 3: Minnesota → Jacksonville. Jacksonville → Cleveland (D). See Round 1: Cleveland → Jacksonville.) |
| 4 | 127 | Indianapolis Colts | Jalen Travis | T | Iowa State | from LA Rams (Note: No. 127: LA Rams → Indianapolis (D). See Round 4: Indianapolis → LA Rams.) |
| 4 | 128 | Washington Commanders | Jaylin Lane | WR | Virginia Tech | from Houston (Note: No. 128: Houston → Washington (PD). See Round 3: Washington → Houston.) |
| 4 | 129 | Baltimore Ravens | Teddye Buchanan | LB | California | |
| 4 | 130 | New York Jets | Malachi Moore | S | Alabama | from Detroit via Denver and Philadelphia (Note: No. 130: Detroit → Denver → Philadelphia → NY Jets. Multiple trades: Detroit → Denver (D). See Round 3: Denver → Detroit. Denver → Philadelphia (D). See Round 3: Philadelphia → Denver. Philadelphia → NY Jets (D). Philadelphia traded a fourth-round selection (130th overall) to the NY Jets in exchange for fifth- and sixth-round selections (145th and 207th overall).) |
| 4 | 131 | New Orleans Saints | Quincy Riley | CB | Louisville | from Washington (Note: No. 131: Washington → New Orleans (PD). See Round 3: Washington → New Orleans.) |
| 4 | 132 | Chicago Bears | Ruben Hyppolite II | LB | Maryland | from Buffalo (Note: No. 132: Buffalo → Chicago (D). See Round 4: Chicago → Buffalo.) |
| 4 | 133 | Kansas City Chiefs | Jalen Royals | WR | Utah State | |
| 4 | 134 | Denver Broncos | Que Robinson | LB | Alabama | from Philadelphia via Detroit and Philadelphia (Note: No. 134: Philadelphia → Detroit → Philadelphia → Denver. Multiple trades: Philadelphia → Detroit (PD). Philadelphia traded a fourth-round selection (134th overall) and a 2023 seventh-round selection to Detroit in exchange for a 2023 seventh-round selection and RB D'Andre Swift. Detroit → Philadelphia (PD). Detroit traded a fourth-round selection (134th overall), and 2024 fifth- and sixth-round selections to Philadelphia in exchange for 2024 fourth- and sixth-round selections. Philadelphia → Denver (D). See Round 3: Philadelphia → Denver.) |
| 4* | 135 | Las Vegas Raiders | Tonka Hemingway | DT | South Carolina | from Miami (Note: No. 135: Miami → Las Vegas (D). See Round 2: Las Vegas → Miami.) |
| 4* | 136 | Tennessee Titans | Elic Ayomanor | WR | Stanford | from Baltimore (Note: No. 136: Baltimore → Tennessee (D). Baltimore traded fourth- and sixth-round selections (136th and 183rd overall) to Tennessee in exchange for fifth- and sixth-round selections (141st and 178th overall).) |
| 4* | 137 | New England Patriots | Joshua Farmer | DT | Florida State | from Seattle (Note: No. 137: Seattle → New England (D). Seattle traded a fourth-round selection (137th overall) to New England in exchange for fifth- and seventh-round selections (144th and 238th overall).) |
| 4* | 138 | San Francisco 49ers | Jordan Watkins | WR | Ole Miss | |
| 5 | 139 | Minnesota Vikings | Tyrion Ingram-Dawkins | DE | Georgia | from Cleveland (Note: No. 139: Cleveland → Minnesota (PD). Cleveland traded a fifth-round selection (139th overall) and a 2024 fifth-round selection to Minnesota in exchange for sixth- and seventh-round selections (200th and 240th overall), and DE Za'Darius Smith.) |
| 5 | 140 | Carolina Panthers | Cam Jackson | DT | Florida | from NY Giants (Note: No. 140: NY Giants → Carolina (PD). NY Giants traded a conditional fifth-round selection (140th overall), and 2024 second- and fifth-round selections to Carolina in exchange for a 2024 fifth-round selection and LB Brian Burns.) |
| 5 | 141 | Baltimore Ravens | Carson Vinson | T | Alabama A&M | from Tennessee (Note: No. 141: Tennessee → Baltimore (D). See Round 4: Baltimore → Tennessee.) |
| 5 | 142 | Seattle Seahawks | Rylie Mills | DT | Notre Dame | from Jacksonville via Houston and Minnesota (Note: No. 142: Jacksonville → Houston → Minnesota → Seattle. Multiple trades: Jacksonville → Houston (D). See Round 3: Houston → Jacksonville. Houston → Minnesota (D). See Round 3: Minnesota → Houston. Minnesota → Seattle (D). Minnesota traded a fifth-round selection (142nd overall) to Seattle in exchange for a fifth-round selection (172nd overall) and QB Sam Howell.) |
| 5 | 143 | Miami Dolphins | Jordan Phillips | DT | Maryland | from Las Vegas (Note: No. 143: Las Vegas → Miami (D). See Round 2: Las Vegas → Miami.) |
| 5 | 144 | Cleveland Browns | Shedeur Sanders ^{†} | QB | Colorado | 2024 Johnny Unitas Golden Arm Award winner; from New England via Seattle (Note: No. 144: New England → Seattle → Cleveland. Multiple trades: New England → Seattle (D). See Round 5: Seattle → New England. Seattle → Cleveland (D). Seattle traded a fifth-round selection (144th overall) to Cleveland in exchange for fifth- and sixth-round selections (166th and 192nd overall).) |
| 5 | 145 | Philadelphia Eagles | Mac McWilliams | CB | UCF | from NY Jets (Note: No. 145: NY Jets → Philadelphia (D). See Round 4: Philadelphia → NY Jets.) |
| 5 | 146 | New England Patriots | Bradyn Swinson | DE | LSU | from Carolina (Note: No. 146: Carolina → New England (D). See Round 3: New England → Carolina.) |
| 5 | 147 | San Francisco 49ers | Jordan James | RB | Oregon | from New Orleans via Washington (Note: No. 147: New Orleans → Washington → San Francisco. Multiple trades: New Orleans → Washington (PD). See Round 3: Washington → New Orleans. Washington → San Francisco (PD). Washington traded a fifth-round selection (147th overall) to San Francisco in exchange for WR Deebo Samuel.) |
| 5 | 148 | Los Angeles Rams | Ty Hamilton | DT | Ohio State | from Chicago (Note: No. 148: Chicago → LA Rams (D). Chicago traded a fifth-round selection (148th overall) to the LA Rams in exchange for a sixth-round selection (195th overall) and a 2026 fourth-round selection.) |
| 5 | – | San Francisco 49ers | Selection forfeited (Note: San Francisco forfeited its fifth-round selection as the punishment for administrative payroll accounting errors that occurred during the 2022 season.) | | | |
| 5 | 149 | Dallas Cowboys | Jaydon Blue | RB | Texas | |
| 5 | 150 | Miami Dolphins | Jason Marshall Jr. | CB | Florida | |
| 5 | 151 | Indianapolis Colts | DJ Giddens | RB | Kansas State | |
| 5 | – | Atlanta Falcons | Selection forfeited (Note: Atlanta forfeited its fifth-round selection as the punishment for "improper contact" with QB Kirk Cousins, WR Darnell Mooney and TE Charlie Woerner in violation of the league's anti-tampering policy.) | | | |
| 5 | 152 | Dallas Cowboys | Shemar James | LB | Florida | from Arizona (Note: No. 152: Arizona → Dallas (D). Arizona traded a fifth-round selection (152nd overall) to Dallas in exchange for fifth- and sixth-round selections (174th and 211th overall).) |
| 5 | 153 | Cincinnati Bengals | Jalen Rivers | G | Miami (FL) | |
| 5 | 154 | New York Giants | Marcus Mbow | G | Purdue | from Seattle (Note: No. 154: Seattle → NY Giants (PD). Seattle traded a fifth-round selection (154th overall) and a 2024 second-round selection to the NY Giants in exchange for DL Leonard Williams.) |
| 5 | 155 | Miami Dolphins | Dante Trader Jr. | S | Maryland | from Denver (Note: No. 155: Denver → Miami (PD). Denver traded a fifth-round selection (155th overall) and LB Bradley Chubb to Miami in exchange for a 2023 first-round selection, a 2024 fourth-round selection and RB Chase Edmonds.) |
| 5 | 156 | Kansas City Chiefs | Jeffrey Bassa | LB | Oregon | from Pittsburgh (Note: No. 156: Pittsburgh → Kansas City (D). Pittsburgh traded a fifth-round selection (156th overall) to Kansas City in exchange for fifth- and seventh-round selections (164th and 226th overall).) |
| 5 | 157 | Tampa Bay Buccaneers | Elijah Roberts | DE | SMU | |
| 5 | 158 | Los Angeles Chargers | KeAndre Lambert-Smith | WR | Auburn | |
| 5 | 159 | Green Bay Packers | Collin Oliver | LB | Oklahoma State | |
| 5 | 160 | San Francisco 49ers | Marques Sigle | S | Kansas State | from Minnesota (Note: No. 160: Minnesota → San Francisco (PD). Minnesota traded a fifth-round selection (160th overall) and a 2026 sixth-round selection to San Francisco in exchange for a sixth-round selection (187th overall) and RB Jordan Mason.) |
| 5 | 161 | Philadelphia Eagles | Smael Mondon Jr. | LB | Georgia | from Houston (Note: No. 161: Houston → Philadelphia (PD). Houston traded a fifth-round selection (161st overall) and a 2024 fourth-round selection to Philadelphia in exchange for a 2024 fourth-round selection.) |
| 5 | 162 | New York Jets | Francisco Mauigoa | LB | Miami (FL) | from LA Rams via Pittsburgh (Note: No. 162: LA Rams → Pittsburgh → NY Jets. Multiple trades: LA Rams → Pittsburgh (PD). LA Rams traded a fifth-round selection (162nd overall) and a 2024 fourth-round selection to Pittsburgh in exchange for a sixth-round selection (195th overall), a 2024 fifth-round selection and G Kevin Dotson. Pittsburgh → NY Jets (PD). Pittsburgh traded a fifth-round selection (162nd overall) to the NY Jets for WR Mike Williams.) |
| 5 | 163 | Carolina Panthers | Mitchell Evans | TE | Notre Dame | from Baltimore (Note: No. 163: Baltimore → Carolina (PD). Baltimore traded a fifth-round selection (163rd overall) to Carolina in exchange for a sixth-round selection (183rd overall) and WR Diontae Johnson.) |
| 5 | 164 | Pittsburgh Steelers | Yahya Black | DT | Iowa | from Detroit via Cleveland, Philadelphia and Kansas City (Note: No. 164: Detroit → Cleveland → Philadelphia → Kansas City → Pittsburgh. Multiple trades: Detroit → Cleveland (PD). Detroit traded a fifth-round selection (164th overall) and a 2026 sixth-round selection to Cleveland in exchange for a 2026 seventh-round selection and DE Za'Darius Smith. Cleveland → Philadelphia (PD). Cleveland traded a fifth-round selection (164th overall) and QB Dorian Thompson-Robinson to Philadelphia in exchange for QB Kenny Pickett. Philadelphia → Kansas City (D). See Round 1: Kansas City → Philadelphia. Kansas City → Pittsburgh (D). See Round 5: Pittsburgh → Kansas City.) |
| 5 | 165 | Los Angeles Chargers | Oronde Gadsden II | TE | Syracuse | from Washington via Philadelphia (Note: No. 165: Washington → Philadelphia → LA Chargers. Multiple trades: Washington → Philadelphia (PD). See Round 3: Philadelphia → Washington. Philadelphia → LA Chargers (D). Philadelphia traded a fifth-round selection (165th overall) to the LA Chargers in exchange for two sixth-round selections (181st and 209th overall).) |
| 5 | 166 | Seattle Seahawks | Tory Horton | WR | Colorado State | from Buffalo via Houston and Cleveland (Note: No. 166: Buffalo → Houston → Cleveland → Seattle. Multiple trades: Buffalo → Houston (PD). See Round 2: Houston → Buffalo. Houston → Cleveland (PD). Houston traded a fifth-round selection (166th overall) and a 2027 fifth-round selection to Cleveland in exchange for two sixth-round selections and a seventh-round selection (179th, 216th and 255th overall). Cleveland → Seattle (D). See Round 5: Seattle → Cleveland.) |
| 5 | 167 | Tennessee Titans | Jackson Slater | G | Sacramento State | from Kansas City (Note: No. 167: Kansas City → Tennessee (PD). Kansas City traded a conditional fifth-round selection (167th overall) to Tennessee in exchange for WR DeAndre Hopkins. The condition – that Tennessee would receive a fifth-round selection if the Chiefs failed to advance to Super Bowl LIX or Hopkins played in less than 60% of the Chiefs' snaps – was converted at the end of the regular season, with Hopkins having played in less than 50% of the Chiefs' 2024 snaps following the trade.) |
| 5 | 168 | Philadelphia Eagles | Drew Kendall | C | Boston College | |
| 5* | 169 | Chicago Bears | Zah Frazier | CB | UTSA | from Buffalo (Note: No. 169: Buffalo → Chicago (D). See Round 4: Chicago → Buffalo.) |
| 5* | 170 | Buffalo Bills | Jordan Hancock | CB | Ohio State | from Dallas (Note: No. 170: Dallas → Buffalo (PD). Dallas traded a fifth-round selection (170th overall) and a 2026 seventh-round selection to Buffalo in exchange for a sixth-round selection (204th overall) and CB Kaiir Elam.) |
| 5* | 171 | Detroit Lions | Miles Frazier | G | LSU | from Dallas via New England (Note: No. 171: Dallas → New England → Detroit. Multiple trades: Dallas → New England (PD). Dallas traded a fifth-round selection (171st overall) to New England in exchange for a seventh-round selection (217th overall) and QB Joe Milton. New England → Detroit (D). New England traded a fifth-round selection (171st overall) to Detroit in exchange for sixth- and seventh-round selections (182nd and 228th overall).) |
| 5* | 172 | Los Angeles Rams | Chris Paul Jr. | LB | Ole Miss | from Seattle via Minnesota (Note: No. 172: Seattle → Minnesota → LA Rams. Multiple trades: Seattle → Minnesota (D). See Round 5: Minnesota → Seattle. Minnesota → LA Rams (D). Minnesota traded a fifth-round selection (172nd overall) to LA Rams in exchange for two sixth-round selection (201st and 202nd overall).) |
| 5* | 173 | Buffalo Bills | Jackson Hawes | TE | Georgia Tech | |
| 5* | 174 | Arizona Cardinals | Denzel Burke | CB | Ohio State | from Dallas (Note: No. 174: Dallas → Arizona (D). See Round 5: Arizona → Dallas.) |
| 5* | 175 | Seattle Seahawks | Robbie Ouzts | FB | Alabama | |
| 5* | 176 | New York Jets | Tyler Baron | DE | Miami (FL) | from Baltimore (Note: No. 176: Baltimore → NY Jets (D). Baltimore traded a fifth-round selection (176th overall) and a 2026 sixth-round selection to the NY Jets in exchange for a sixth-round selection (186th overall) and a 2026 fifth-round selection.) |
| 6 | 177 | Buffalo Bills | Dorian Strong | CB | Virginia Tech | from NY Giants (Note: No. 177: NY Giants → Buffalo (PD). NY Giants traded a sixth-round selection (177th overall) to Buffalo in exchange for a seventh-round selection (246th overall) and LB Carlos Basham Jr.) |
| 6 | 178 | Baltimore Ravens | Bilhal Kone | CB | Western Michigan | from Tennessee (Note: No. 178: Tennessee → Baltimore (D). See Round 4: Baltimore → Tennessee.) |
| 6 | 179 | Miami Dolphins | Ollie Gordon II | RB | Oklahoma State | from Cleveland via Houston (Note: No. 179: Cleveland → Houston → Miami. Multiple trades: Cleveland → Houston (PD). See Round 5: Houston → Cleveland. Houston → Miami (D). See Round 4: Miami → Houston.) |
| 6 | 180 | Las Vegas Raiders | JJ Pegues | DT | Ole Miss | |
| 6 | 181 | Philadelphia Eagles | Kyle McCord | QB | Syracuse | from New England via LA Chargers (Note: No. 181: New England → LA Chargers → Philadelphia. Multiple trades: New England → LA Chargers (PD). New England traded a sixth-round selection (181st overall) to the LA Chargers in exchange for a seventh-round selection (238th overall) and CB J. C. Jackson. LA Chargers → Philadelphia (D). See Round 5: Philadelphia → LA Chargers.) |
| 6 | 182 | New England Patriots | Andrés Borregales | K | Miami (FL) | from Jacksonville via Detroit (Note: No. 182: Jacksonville → Detroit → New England. Multiple trades: Jacksonville → Detroit (D). See Round 3: Jacksonville → Detroit. Detroit → New England (D). See Round 3: New England → Detroit.) |
| 6 | 183 | Tennessee Titans | Marcus Harris | CB | California | from Carolina via Baltimore (Note: No. 183: Carolina → Baltimore → Tennessee. Multiple trades: Carolina → Baltimore (PD). See Round 5: Baltimore → Carolina. Baltimore → Tennessee (D). See Round 4: Baltimore → Tennessee.) |
| 6 | 184 | New Orleans Saints | Devin Neal | RB | Kansas | from New Orleans via Washington (Note: No. 184: New Orleans → Washington → New Orleans. Multiple trades: New Orleans → Washington (PD). New Orleans traded a sixth-round selection (184th overall) to Washington in exchange for a seventh-round selection (248th overall) and DT John Ridgeway III. Washington → New Orleans (PD). See Round 3: Washington → New Orleans.) |
| 6 | 185 | Pittsburgh Steelers | Will Howard | QB | Ohio State | from Chicago via Seattle (Note: No. 185: Chicago → Seattle → Pittsburgh. Multiple trades: Chicago → Seattle (PD). Chicago traded a sixth-round selection (185th overall) to Seattle in exchange for LB Darrell Taylor. Seattle → Pittsburgh (PD). See Round 2: Pittsburgh → Seattle.) |
| 6 | 186 | Baltimore Ravens | Tyler Loop | K | Arizona | from NY Jets (Note: No. 186: NY Jets → Baltimore (D). See Round 5: Baltimore → NY Jets.) |
| 6 | 187 | Houston Texans | Jaylen Reed | S | Penn State | from San Francisco via Minnesota (Note: No. 187: San Francisco → Minnesota → Houston. Multiple trades: San Francisco → Minnesota (PD). See Round 5: Minnesota → San Francisco. Minnesota → Houston (D). See Round 3: Minnesota → Houston.) |
| 6 | 188 | Tennessee Titans | Kalel Mullings | RB | Michigan | from Dallas (Note: No. 188: Dallas → Tennessee (PD). Dallas traded a sixth-round selection (188th overall) to Tennessee in exchange for a seventh-round selection (239th overall) and RB Kenneth Murray.) |
| 6 | 189 | Indianapolis Colts | Riley Leonard | QB | Notre Dame | |
| 6 | 190 | Indianapolis Colts | Tim Smith | DT | Alabama | from Atlanta via LA Rams (Note: No. 190: Atlanta → LA Rams → Indianapolis. Multiple trades: Atlanta → LA Rams (PD). Atlanta traded a sixth-round selection (190th overall) to the LA Rams in exchange for a seventh-round selection (242nd overall) and WR Van Jefferson. LA Rams → Indianapolis (D). See Round 4: Indianapolis → LA Rams.) |
| 6 | 191 | Philadelphia Eagles | Myles Hinton | T | Michigan | from Arizona via Denver (Note: No. 191: Arizona → Denver → Philadelphia. Multiple trades: Arizona → Denver (PD). Arizona traded a sixth-round selection (191st overall) to Denver in exchange for LB Baron Browning. Denver → Philadelphia (D). See Round 3: Philadelphia → Denver.) |
| 6 | 192 | Seattle Seahawks | Bryce Cabeldue | G | Kansas | from Miami via Chicago and Cleveland (Note: No. 192: Miami → Chicago → Cleveland → Seattle. Multiple trades: Miami → Chicago (PD). Miami traded a sixth-round selection (192nd overall) to Chicago in exchange for a seventh-round selection (224th overall) and WR Chase Claypool. Chicago → Cleveland (PD). Chicago traded a sixth-round selection (192nd overall) to Cleveland for a seventh-round selection (240th overall) and DT Chris Williams. Cleveland → Seattle (D). See Round 5: Seattle → Cleveland.) |
| 6 | 193 | Cincinnati Bengals | Tahj Brooks | RB | Texas Tech | |
| 6 | 194 | Jacksonville Jaguars | Jalen McLeod | LB | Auburn | from Seattle (Note: No. 194: Seattle → Jacksonville (PD). Seattle traded a sixth-round selection (194th overall) to Jacksonville in exchange for LB Trevis Gipson.) |
| 6 | 195 | Chicago Bears | Luke Newman | G | Michigan State | from Pittsburgh via LA Rams (Note: No. 195: Pittsburgh → LA Rams → Chicago. Multiple trades: Pittsburgh → LA Rams (PD). See Round 5: LA Rams → Pittsburgh. LA Rams → Chicago (D). See Round 5: Chicago → LA Rams.) |
| 6 | 196 | Detroit Lions | Ahmed Hassanein | DE | Boise State | from Tampa Bay (Note: No. 196: Tampa Bay → Detroit (PD). Tampa Bay traded a sixth-round selection (196th overall), a 2024 sixth-round selection and CB Carlton Davis to Detroit in exchange for a 2024 third-round selection.) |
| 6 | 197 | Houston Texans | Graham Mertz | QB | Florida | from Denver (Note: No. 197: Denver → Houston (D). Denver traded a sixth-round selection (197th overall) to Houston in exchange for sixth- and seventh-round selections (216th and 241st overall).) |
| 6 | 198 | Green Bay Packers | Warren Brinson | DT | Georgia | |
| 6 | 199 | Los Angeles Chargers | Branson Taylor | T | Pittsburgh | |
| 6 | 200 | Jacksonville Jaguars | Rayuan Lane III | S | Navy | from Minnesota via Cleveland (Note: No. 200: Minnesota → Cleveland → Jacksonville. Multiple trades: Minnesota → Cleveland (PD). See Round 5: Cleveland → Minnesota. Cleveland → Jacksonville (D). See Round 1: Cleveland → Jacksonville.) |
| 6 | 201 | Minnesota Vikings | Kobe King | LB | Penn State | from LA Rams (Note: No. 201: LA Rams → Minnesota (D). See Round 5: Minnesota → LA Rams.) |
| 6 | 202 | Minnesota Vikings | Gavin Bartholomew | TE | Pittsburgh | from Houston via Pittsburgh, Chicago and LA Rams (Note: No. 202: Houston → Pittsburgh → Chicago → LA Rams → Minnesota. Multiple trades: Houston → Pittsburgh (PD). Houston traded a sixth-round selection (202nd overall) to Pittsburgh in exchange for G Kendrick Green. Pittsburgh → Chicago (PD). Pittsburgh traded a conditional sixth-round selection (202nd overall) to Chicago in exchange for QB Justin Fields. The condition – which would have given Chicago a fourth-round selection if Fields played in 51% of the Steelers' snaps in 2024 – was not met. Chicago → LA Rams (PD). Chicago traded a sixth-round selection (202nd overall) to the LA Rams in exchange for G Jonah Jackson. LA Rams → Minnesota (D). See Round 5: Minnesota → LA Rams.) |
| 6 | 203 | Baltimore Ravens | LaJohntay Wester | WR | Colorado | |
| 6 | 204 | Dallas Cowboys | Ajani Cornelius | T | Oregon | from Detroit via Cleveland and Buffalo (Note: No. 204: Detroit → Cleveland → Buffalo → Dallas. Multiple trades: Detroit → Cleveland (PD). Detroit traded a sixth-round selection (204th overall) to Cleveland in exchange for WR Donovan Peoples-Jones. Cleveland → Buffalo (PD). See Round 3: Buffalo → Cleveland. Buffalo → Dallas (PD). See Round 5: Dallas → Buffalo.) |
| 6 | 205 | Washington Commanders | Kain Medrano | LB | UCLA | |
| 6 | 206 | Buffalo Bills | Chase Lundt | T | UConn | |
| 6 | 207 | Philadelphia Eagles | Cameron Williams | T | Texas | from Kansas City via NY Jets (Note: No. 207: Kansas City → NY Jets → Philadelphia. Multiple trades: Kansas City → NY Jets (PD). Kansas City traded a sixth-round selection (207th overall) to the NY Jets in exchange for a seventh-round selection (225th overall) and WR Mecole Hardman. NY Jets → Philadelphia (D). See Round 4: Philadelphia → NY Jets.) |
| 6 | 208 | Carolina Panthers | Jimmy Horn Jr. | WR | Colorado | from Philadelphia via Denver (Note: No. 208: Philadelphia → Denver → Carolina. Multiple trades: Philadelphia → Denver (PD). Philadelphia traded a sixth-round selection (208th overall) to Denver in exchange for a seventh-round selection (236th overall) and TE Albert Okwuegbunam. Denver → Carolina (D). See Round 2: Denver → Carolina.) |
| 6* | 209 | Philadelphia Eagles | Antwaun Powell-Ryland | DE | Virginia Tech | from LA Chargers (Note: No. 209: LA Chargers → Philadelphia (D). See Round 5: Philadelphia → LA Chargers.) |
| 6* | 210 | Baltimore Ravens | Aeneas Peebles | DT | Virginia Tech | |
| 6* | 211 | Arizona Cardinals | Hayden Conner | G | Texas | from Dallas (Note: No. 211: Dallas → Arizona (D). See Round 5: Arizona → Dallas.) |
| 6* | 212 | Baltimore Ravens | Robert Longerbeam | CB | Rutgers | |
| 6* | 213 | Las Vegas Raiders | Tommy Mellott | WR | Montana State | |
| 6* | 214 | Los Angeles Chargers | R. J. Mickens | S | Clemson | |
| 6* | 215 | Las Vegas Raiders | Cam Miller | QB | North Dakota State | |
| 6* | 216 | Denver Broncos | Jeremy Crawshaw | P | Florida | from Cleveland via Houston (Note: No. 216: Cleveland → Houston → Denver. Multiple trades: Cleveland → Houston (PD). See Round 5: Houston → Cleveland. Houston → Denver (D). See Round 6: Denver → Houston.) |
| 7 | 217 | Dallas Cowboys | Jay Toia | DT | UCLA | from Tennessee via New England (Note: No. 217: Tennessee → New England → Dallas (PD). Multiple trades: Tennessee → New England (PD). Tennessee traded a seventh-round selection (217th overall) to New England in exchange for K Nick Folk. New England → Dallas (PD). See Round 5: Dallas → New England.) |
| 7 | 218 | Atlanta Falcons | Jack Nelson | T | Wisconsin | from Cleveland via LA Chargers (Note: No. 218: Cleveland → LA Chargers → Atlanta. Multiple trades: Cleveland → LA Chargers (PD). Cleveland traded a seventh-round selection (218th overall) to the LA Chargers in exchange for K Dustin Hopkins. LA Chargers → Atlanta (PD). LA Chargers traded a conditional seventh-round selection (218th overall) to Atlanta in exchange for QB Taylor Heinicke.) |
| 7 | 219 | New York Giants | Thomas Fidone | TE | Nebraska | |
| 7 | 220 | New England Patriots | Marcus Bryant | T | Missouri | |
| 7 | 221 | Jacksonville Jaguars | Jonah Monheim | C | USC | |
| 7 | 222 | Las Vegas Raiders | Cody Lindenberg | LB | Minnesota | |
| 7 | 223 | Seattle Seahawks | Damien Martinez | RB | Miami (FL) | from New Orleans via Philadelphia and Pittsburgh (Note: No. 223: New Orleans → Philadelphia → Pittsburgh → Seattle. Multiple trades: New Orleans → Philadelphia (PD). New Orleans traded a seventh-round selection (223rd overall) and S C. J. Gardner-Johnson to Philadelphia in exchange for a 2023 fifth-round selection and a 2024 sixth-round selection. Philadelphia → Pittsburgh (PD). Philadelphia traded two seventh-round selections (223rd and 229th overall) and a 2024 third-round selection to Pittsburgh in exchange for a 2024 fourth-round selection and QB Kenny Pickett. Pittsburgh → Seattle (PD). See Round 2: Pittsburgh → Seattle.) |
| 7 | 224 | Houston Texans | Kyonte Hamilton | DT | Rutgers | from Chicago (Note: No. 224: Chicago → Miami → Houston. Multiple trades: Chicago → Miami (PD). See Round 6: Miami → Chicago. Miami → Houston (D). See Round 4: Miami → Houston.) |
| 7 | 225 | Arizona Cardinals | Kitan Crawford | S | Nevada | from NY Jets via Kansas City (Note: No. 225: NY Jets → Kansas City → Arizona. Multiple trades: NY Jets → Kansas City (PD). See Round 6: Kansas City → NY Jets. Kansas City → Arizona (PD). Kansas City traded a seventh-round selection (225th overall) to Arizona in exchange for DE Cameron Thomas.) |
| 7 | 226 | Pittsburgh Steelers | Carson Bruener | LB | Washington | from Carolina via Kansas City (Note: No. 226: Carolina → Kansas City → Pittsburgh. Multiple trades: Carolina → Kansas City (PD). Carolina traded a conditional seventh-round selection (226th overall) to Kansas City in exchange for a conditional seventh-round selection (247th overall) and WR Ihmir Smith-Marsette. Kansas City → Pittsburgh (D). See Round 5: Pittsburgh → Kansas City.) |
| 7 | 227 | San Francisco 49ers | Kurtis Rourke | QB | Indiana | 2024 Jon Cornish Trophy winner |
| 7 | 228 | Kansas City Chiefs | Brashard Smith | RB | SMU | from Dallas via Detroit and New England (Note: No. 228: Dallas → Detroit → New England → Kansas City. Multiple trades: Dallas → Detroit (PD). Dallas traded a seventh-round selection (228th overall) and a 2024 first-round selection to Detroit in exchange for 2024 first- and third-round selections. Detroit → New England (D). See Round 5: New England → Detroit. New England → Kansas City (D). New England traded a seventh-round selection (228th overall) to Kansas City in exchange for two seventh-round selections (251st and 257th overall).) |
| 7 | 229 | Pittsburgh Steelers | Donte Kent | CB | Central Michigan | from Atlanta via Philadelphia (Note: No. 229: Atlanta → Philadelphia → Pittsburgh. Multiple trades: Atlanta → Philadelphia (PD). Atlanta traded a seventh-round selection (229th overall) to Philadelphia in exchange for DE Kentavius Street. Philadelphia → Pittsburgh (PD). See Round 7: Philadelphia → Pittsburgh.) |
| 7 | 230 | Detroit Lions | Dan Jackson | S | Georgia | from Arizona via Carolina and Denver (Note: No. 230: Arizona → Carolina → Denver → Detroit. Multiple trades: Arizona → Carolina (PD). Arizona traded a seventh-round selection (230th overall) and a 2024 sixth-round selection to Carolina in exchange for WR Robbie Chosen. Carolina → Denver (D). See Round 2: Denver → Carolina. Denver → Detroit (D). See Round 2: Denver → Detroit.) |
| 7 | 231 | Miami Dolphins | Quinn Ewers | QB | Texas | |
| 7 | 232 | Indianapolis Colts | Hunter Wohler | S | Wisconsin | |
| 7 | 233 | Chicago Bears | Kyle Monangai | RB | Rutgers | from Cincinnati (Note: No. 233: Cincinnati → Chicago (PD). Cincinnati traded a seventh-round selection (233rd overall) to Chicago in exchange for RB Khalil Herbert.) |
| 7 | 234 | Seattle Seahawks | Mason Richman | T | Iowa | |
| 7 | 235 | Tampa Bay Buccaneers | Tez Johnson | WR | Oregon | |
| 7 | 236 | Jacksonville Jaguars | LeQuint Allen | RB | Syracuse | from Denver via Philadelphia, Washington and Houston (Note: No. 236: Denver → Philadelphia → Washington → Houston → Jacksonville. Multiple trades: Denver → Philadelphia (PD). See Round 6: Philadelphia → Denver. Philadelphia → Washington (PD). See Round 3: Philadelphia → Washington. Washington → Houston (PD). See Round 7: Houston → Washington. Houston → Jacksonville (D). See Round 3: Houston → Jacksonville.) |
| 7 | 237 | Green Bay Packers | Micah Robinson | CB | Tulane | from Pittsburgh (Note: No. 237: Pittsburgh → Green Bay (PD). Pittsburgh traded a seventh-round selection (237th overall) to Green Bay in exchange for LB Preston Smith.) |
| 7 | 238 | Seattle Seahawks | Ricky White III | WR | UNLV | from LA Chargers via New England (Note: No. 238: LA Chargers → New England → Seattle. Multiple trades: LA Chargers → New England (PD). See Round 6: New England → LA Chargers. New England → Seattle (D). See Round 5: Seattle → New England.) |
| 7 | 239 | Dallas Cowboys | Phil Mafah | RB | Clemson | from Green Bay via Tennessee (Note: No. 239: Green Bay → Tennessee → Dallas. Multiple trades: Green Bay → Tennessee (PD). Green Bay traded a seventh-round selection (239th overall) to Tennessee in exchange for QB Malik Willis. Tennessee → Dallas (PD). See Round 6: Dallas → Tennessee.) |
| 7 | 240 | Buffalo Bills | Kaden Prather | WR | Maryland | from Minnesota via Cleveland and Chicago (Note: No. 240: Minnesota → Cleveland → Chicago → Buffalo. Multiple trades: Minnesota → Cleveland (PD). See Round 5: Cleveland → Minnesota. Cleveland → Chicago (PD). See Round 6: Chicago → Cleveland. Chicago → Buffalo (D). See Round 2: Chicago → Buffalo.) |
| 7 | 241 | Denver Broncos | Caleb Lohner | TE | Utah | from Houston (Note: No. 241: Houston → Denver (D). See Round 6: Denver → Houston.) |
| 7 | 242 | Los Angeles Rams | Konata Mumpfield | WR | Pittsburgh | from LA Rams via Atlanta (Note: No. 242: LA Rams → Atlanta → LA Rams Multiple trades: LA Rams → Atlanta (PD) See Round 6: Atlanta → LA Rams. Atlanta → LA Rams (D) See Round 1: LA Rams → Atlanta.) |
| 7 | 243 | Baltimore Ravens | Garrett Dellinger | G | LSU | |
| 7 | 244 | Detroit Lions | Dominic Lovett | WR | Georgia | |
| 7 | 245 | Washington Commanders | Jacory Croskey-Merritt | RB | Arizona | |
| 7 | 246 | New York Giants | Korie Black | CB | Oklahoma State | from Buffalo (Note: No. 246: Buffalo → NY Giants (PD). See Round 6: NY Giants → Buffalo.) |
| 7 | 247 | Dallas Cowboys | Tommy Akingbesote | DT | Maryland | from Kansas City via Carolina (Note: No. 247: Kansas City → Carolina → Dallas. Multiple trades: Kansas City → Carolina (PD). See Round 7: Carolina → Kansas City. Carolina → Dallas (PD). See Round 4: Dallas → Carolina.) |
| 7 | 248 | New Orleans Saints | Moliki Matavao | TE | UCLA | from Philadelphia via Washington (Note: No. 248: Philadelphia → Washington → New Orleans. Multiple trades: Philadelphia → Washington (PD). See Round 3: Philadelphia → Washington. Washington → New Orleans (PD). See Round 6: New Orleans → Washington.) |
| 7* | 249 | San Francisco 49ers | Connor Colby | G | Iowa | |
| 7* | 250 | Green Bay Packers | John Williams | G | Cincinnati | |
| 7* | 251 | New England Patriots | Julian Ashby | LS | Vanderbilt | from Kansas City (Note: No. 251: Kansas City → New England (D). See Round 7: New England → Kansas City.) |
| 7* | 252 | San Francisco 49ers | Junior Bergen | WR | Montana | |
| 7* | 253 | Miami Dolphins | Zeek Biggers | DT | Georgia Tech | |
| 7* | 254 | New Orleans Saints | Fadil Diggs | DE | Syracuse | |
| 7* | 255 | Houston Texans | Luke Lachey | TE | Iowa | from Cleveland (Note: No. 255: Cleveland → Houston (PD). See Round 5: Houston → Cleveland.) |
| 7* | 256 | Los Angeles Chargers | Trikweze Bridges | CB | Florida | |
| 7* | 257 | New England Patriots | Kobee Minor | CB | Memphis | from Kansas City (Note: No. 257: Kansas City → New England (D). See Round 7: New England → Kansas City.) |

== Notable undrafted players ==
| Original NFL team | Player | Pos. | College | Notes |
|---|---|---|---|---|
| Arizona Cardinals | Josh Fryar | T | Ohio State | |
| Atlanta Falcons | Nate Carter | RB | Michigan State | |
| Atlanta Falcons | Cobee Bryant | CB | Kansas | |
| Baltimore Ravens | Jay Higgins | LB | Iowa | |
| Baltimore Ravens | Reuben Lowery | CB | Chattanooga | |
| Baltimore Ravens | Keyon Martin | CB | Louisiana | |
| Buffalo Bills | Keleki Latu | TE | Washington | |
| Carolina Panthers | Ryan Fitzgerald | K | Florida State | |
| Chicago Bears | Jahdae Walker | WR | Texas A&M | |
| Cincinnati Bengals | William Wagner | LS | Michigan | |
| Cleveland Browns | Isaiah Bond | WR | Texas | |
| Denver Broncos | Karene Reid | LB | Utah | |
| Denver Broncos | Xavier Truss | T | Georgia | |
| Denver Broncos | Jordan Turner | LB | Michigan State | |
| Houston Texans | Austin Brinkman | LS | West Virginia | |
| Kansas City Chiefs | Jake Briningstool | TE | Clemson | |
| Kansas City Chiefs | Cooper McDonald | LB | TCU | |
| Kansas City Chiefs | Esa Pole | T | Washington State | |
| Minnesota Vikings | Max Brosmer | QB | Minnesota | |
| Minnesota Vikings | Myles Price | WR | Indiana | |
| New England Patriots | Efton Chism III | WR | Eastern Washington | |
| New Orleans Saints | Torricelli Simpkins III | G | South Carolina | |
| New York Jets | Brady Cook | QB | Missouri | |
| New York Jets | Kai Kroeger | P | South Carolina | |
| Philadelphia Eagles | Darius Cooper | WR | Tarleton State | |
| Pittsburgh Steelers | Sebastian Castro | S | Iowa | |
| Seattle Seahawks | Nick Kallerup | TE | Minnesota | |
| Seattle Seahawks | Amari Kight | T | UCF | |
| Seattle Seahawks | Connor O'Toole | LB | Utah | |
| Tennessee Titans | Cam Horsley | DT | Boston College | |
| Tennessee Titans | Xavier Restrepo | WR | Miami (FL) | |
| Washington Commanders | Ja'Corey Brooks | WR | Louisville | |
| Washington Commanders | Jacoby Jones | WR | UCF | |

== Trades involving draft picks ==
In the explanations below (PD) indicates trades completed prior to the start of the draft (i.e. Pre–Draft), while (D) denotes trades that take place during the 2025 draft.

== Resolution JC-2A picks ==
Resolution JC-2A, enacted by the NFL in November 2020, rewards teams for developing minority candidates for head coach and/or general manager positions. The resolution rewards teams whose minority candidates are hired away for one of those positions by awarding compensatory draft picks. These draft picks are at the end of the third round, after standard compensatory picks; if multiple teams qualify, they are awarded by draft order in the first round. These picks are in addition to the standard 32 compensatory picks. Three picks were awarded for the 2025 draft pursuant to the resolution, to San Francisco, Denver and Minnesota.

== Prank call controversy ==
During the draft, some prospects received prank calls from people pretending to be NFL front office staff. Shedeur Sanders was the most notable prospect to receive a prank call when on day two of the draft, Jax Ulbrich, the son of Atlanta Falcons defensive coordinator Jeff Ulbrich, and another person pretended to call on behalf of New Orleans Saints. Sydney Schoen, the daughter of New York Giants general manager Joe Schoen, had previously been accused. After the draft, Jax and the Falcons issued an apology to Sanders and his family. Other prospects, including Abdul Carter, Tyler Warren, Mason Graham, Josh Conerly Jr., Kyle McCord, and Chase Lundt, also received calls from unrelated pranksters.

== Summary ==
=== Selections by NCAA conference ===
| Conference | Round 1 | Round 2 | Round 3 | Round 4 | Round 5 | Round 6 | Round 7 | Total |
NCAA Division I FBS football conferences
| American | 0 | 0 | 2 | 0 | 1 | 1 | 2 | 6 |
| ACC | 2 | 5 | 4 | 8 | 7 | 9 | 7 | 42 |
| Big 12 | 2 | 4 | 7 | 2 | 5 | 7 | 4 | 31 |
| Big Ten | 11 | 8 | 10 | 7 | 9 | 9 | 17 | 71 |
| CUSA | 0 | 0 | 1 | 0 | 0 | 0 | 0 | 1 |
| Ind. (FBS) | 0 | 1 | 1 | 1 | 2 | 2 | 0 | 7 |
| MAC | 0 | 0 | 2 | 0 | 0 | 1 | 1 | 4 |
| MW | 1 | 0 | 0 | 1 | 1 | 1 | 2 | 6 |
| Pac-12 | 0 | 0 | 1 | 0 | 0 | 0 | 0 | 1 |
| SEC | 15 | 13 | 9 | 16 | 11 | 8 | 7 | 79 |
| Sun Belt | 0 | 1 | 0 | 0 | 0 | 0 | 0 | 1 |
NCAA Division I FCS football conferences
| Big Sky | 0 | 0 | 0 | 0 | 1 | 1 | 1 | 3 |
| CAA | 0 | 0 | 1 | 0 | 0 | 0 | 0 | 1 |
| MVFC | 1 | 0 | 0 | 0 | 0 | 1 | 0 | 2 |
| SWAC | 0 | 0 | 0 | 0 | 1 | 0 | 0 | 1 |
| UAC | 0 | 0 | 0 | 1 | 0 | 0 | 0 | 1 |

=== Colleges with multiple draft selections ===
| Selections | Colleges |
|---|---|
| 14 | Ohio State |
| 13 | Georgia |
| 12 | Texas |
| 10 | Oregon |
| 8 | Ole Miss |
| 7 | Alabama, Florida, LSU, Miami (FL), Michigan |
| 6 | Maryland, Notre Dame |
| 5 | Iowa, Penn State, South Carolina, UCLA, Virginia Tech |
| 4 | Arizona, California, Colorado, Iowa State, Oklahoma State, Syracuse, Tennessee |
| 3 | Auburn, Boston College, Clemson, Kansas State, Louisville, Minnesota, Missouri, Pittsburgh, Rutgers, Texas A&M, USC |
| 2 | Arkansas, Boise State, Florida State, Georgia Tech, Indiana, Kansas, Kentucky, Nebraska, North Dakota State, Oklahoma, SMU, TCU, Texas Tech, Tulane, UCF, Wisconsin |

=== Selections by position ===
| Position | Round 1 | Round 2 | Round 3 | Round 4 | Round 5 | Round 6 | Round 7 | Total |
|---|---|---|---|---|---|---|---|---|
| Wide receiver | 4 (Note: Travis Hunter was announced as both a cornerback and wide receiver) | 4 | 6 | 7 | 2 | 3 | 6 | 32 |
| Defensive tackle | 5 | 4 | 3 | 5 | 5 | 4 | 4 | 30 |
| Cornerback | 3 | 3 | 9 | 1 | 5 | 4 | 5 | 30 |
| Linebacker | 2 | 3 | 1 | 9 | 6 | 3 | 2 | 26 |
| Running back | 2 | 3 | 1 | 6 | 3 | 4 | 6 | 25 |
| Defensive end | 4 | 4 | 6 | 2 | 4 | 2 | 1 | 23 |
| Offensive tackle | 5 | 3 | 3 | 1 | 1 | 5 | 3 | 21 |
| Safety | 1 | 2 | 3 | 4 | 2 | 3 | 3 | 18 |
| Guard | 3 | 2 | 2 | 0 | 4 | 3 | 3 | 17 |
| Tight end | 2 | 3 | 1 | 1 | 4 | 1 | 4 | 16 |
| Quarterback | 2 | 1 | 2 | 0 | 1 | 5 | 2 | 13 |
| Center | 0 | 0 | 1 | 0 | 1 | 0 | 1 | 3 |
| Kicker | 0 | 0 | 0 | 0 | 0 | 2 | 0 | 2 |
| Punter | 0 | 0 | 0 | 0 | 0 | 1 | 0 | 1 |
| Long snapper | 0 | 0 | 0 | 0 | 0 | 0 | 1 | 1 |
