= List of 2023 college football transfers =

The following is a list of college football players entering the NCAA transfer portal during the window between the 2022 and 2023 seasons. Players are listed in the order of ranking by 247Sports.

Top 25

The following football players were ranked by 247Sports as the top 25 recruits entering the transfer portal during the 2022–23 window.

Player	Position	247Sports rank	2022 School	2023 School
Travis Hunter	Cornerback	1	Jackson State	Colorado
Denver Harris	Cornerback	2	Texas A&M	LSU
Adonai Mitchell	Wide receiver	3	Georgia	Texas
Ernest Hausmann	Linebacker	4	Nebraska	Michigan
Fentrell Cypress	Cornerback	5	Virginia	Florida State
Devontez Walker	Wide receiver	6	Kent State	North Carolina
Sam Hartman	Quarterback	7	Wake Forest	Notre Dame
Devin Leary	Quarterback	8	NC State	Kentucky
Dominic Lovett	Wide receiver	9	Missouri	Georgia
Javion Cohen	Offensive line	10	Alabama	Miami (FL)
Jordan Burch	Edge	11	South Carolina	Oregon
Jaheim Bell	Tight end	12	South Carolina	Florida State
Davison Igbinosun	Cornerback	13	Ole Miss	Ohio State
Bear Alexander	Defensive line	14	Georgia	USC
Avery Jones	Offensive line	15	East Carolina	Auburn
Keon Coleman	Wide receiver	16	Michigan State	Florida State
Hudson Card	Quarterback	17	Texas	Purdue
LaDarius Henderson	Offensive line	18	Arizona State	Michigan
Dasan McCullough	Linebacker	19	Indiana	Oklahoma
Braden Fiske	Defensive line	20	Western Michigan	Florida State
Andre Carter	Defensive line	21	Western Michigan	Indiana
J. Michael Sturdivant	Wide receiver	22	California	UCLA
Zy Alexander	Cornerback	23	Southeastern Louisiana	LSU
Ja'Had Carter	Safety	24	Syracuse	Ohio State
Jordan Hudson	Wide receiver	25	TCU	SMU

Others

- Tunmise Adeleye, defensive line, Texas A&M to Michigan State
- Erick All, tight end, Michigan to Iowa
- Aaron Anderson, wide receiver, Alabama to LSU
- Brennan Armstrong, quarterback, Virginia to NC State
- Hank Bachmeier, quarterback, Boise State to Louisiana Tech
- Smoke Bouie, cornerback, Texas A&M to Georgia
- Jeremiah Byers, offensive tackle, UTEP to Florida State
- Dante Cephas, wide receiver, Kent State to Penn State
- Ajani Cornelius, offensive tackle, Rhode Island to Oregon
- JT Daniels, quarterback, West Virginia to Rice
- CJ Dippre, tight end, Maryland to Alabama
- Tony Grimes, cornerback, North Carolina to Texas A&M
- Traeshon Holden, wide receiver, Alabama to Oregon
- Walker Howard, quarterback, LSU to Ole Miss
- Ali Jennings, wide receiver, Old Dominion to Virginia Tech
- JK Johnson, cornerback, Ohio State to LSU
- Emory Jones, quarterback, Arizona State to Cincinnati
- Phil Jurkovec, quarterback, Boston College to Pittsburgh
- Haynes King, quarterback, Texas A&M to Georgia Tech
- Trey Knox, tight end, Arkansas to South Carolina
- Matt Lee, inside linebacker, UCF to Miami (FL)
- MarShawn Lloyd, running back, South Carolina to USC
- Francisco Mauigoa, linebacker, Washington State to Miami (FL)
- Sam McCall, cornerback, Florida State to Texas A&M
- Cade McNamara, quarterback, Michigan to Iowa
- Graham Mertz, quarterback, Wisconsin to Florida
- Tanner Mordecai, quarterback, SMU to Wisconsin
- Kyle Morlock, tight end, Shorter to Florida State
- Kaden Prather, wide receiver, West Virginia to Maryland
- Emmanuel Pregnon, inside linebacker, Wyoming to USC
- Caden Prieskorn, tight end, Memphis to Ole Miss
- Drew Pyne, quarterback, Notre Dame to Arizona State
- Austin Reed, quarterback, entered the portal but ultimately remained at Western Kentucky.
- Aidan Robbins, running back, UNLV to BYU
- Justin Rogers, defensive line, Kentucky to Auburn
- Christian Roland-Wallace, cornerback, Alabama to USC
- Shedeur Sanders, quarterback, Jackson State to Colorado
- Spencer Sanders, quarterback, Oklahoma State to Ole Miss
- Collin Schlee, quarterback, Kent State to UCLA
- Jeff Sims, quarterback, Georgia Tech to Nebraska
- Dorian Singer, wide receiver, Arizona to USC
- Kedon Slovis, quarterback, Pittsburgh to BYU
- Donovan Smith, quarterback, Texas Tech to Houston
- Jake Smith, wide receiver, USC to Arizona State
- Carson Steele, running back, Ball State to UCLA
- Austin Stogner, tight end, South Carolina to Oklahoma
- Rara Thomas, wide receiver, Mississippi State to Georgia
- Seydou Traore, tight end, Arkansas State to Colorado
- DJ Uiagalelei, quarterback, Clemson to Oregon State
- Dillon Wade, offensive tackle, Tulsa to Auburn
- Nohl Williams, cornerback, UNLV to California
