= 2023 Florida State Seminoles football team =

American college football season

2023 Florida State Seminoles football

ACC champion Florida Cup champion

ACC Championship, W 16–6 vs. Louisville

Orange Bowl, L 3–63 vs. Georgia
- Conference: Atlantic Coast Conference

Ranking
- Coaches: No. 6
- AP: No. 6
- Record: 13–1 (8–0 ACC)
- Head coach: Mike Norvell (4th season)
- Offensive coordinator: Alex Atkins (2nd season)
- Offensive scheme: Multiple
- Defensive coordinator: Adam Fuller (4th season)
- Co-defensive coordinator: Randy Shannon (2nd season)
- Base defense: 4–3
- Captain: Game captains
- Home stadium: Doak Campbell Stadium

2023 Atlantic Coast Conference football standings
	Conf.			Overall
Team	W		L	W		L
No. 6 Florida State y$	8	–	0	13	–	1
No. 19 Louisville y	7	–	1	10	–	4
No. 21 NC State	6	–	2	9	–	4
Georgia Tech	5	–	3	7	–	6
Virginia Tech	5	–	3	7	–	6
No. 20 Clemson	4	–	4	9	–	4
Duke	4	–	4	8	–	5
North Carolina	4	–	4	8	–	5
Boston College	3	–	5	7	–	6
Miami (FL)	3	–	5	7	–	6
Syracuse	2	–	6	6	–	7
Pittsburgh	2	–	6	3	–	9
Virginia	2	–	6	3	–	9
Wake Forest	1	–	7	4	–	8
Championship: Florida State 16, Louisville 6
$ – Conference champion; y – Championship game participant; Rankings from AP Poll

The 2023 Florida State Seminoles football team represented Florida State University in the Atlantic Coast Conference (ACC) during the 2023 NCAA Division I FBS football season. The Seminoles were led by Mike Norvell, in his fourth year as their head coach. The Seminoles played home games at Doak Campbell Stadium in Tallahassee, Florida.

Looking to build on the success of the 2022 season, Florida State started strong with a win against LSU. The Seminoles remained undefeated during the regular season; however, during the game against North Alabama, senior quarterback Jordan Travis suffered a season-ending injury, marking the end of his college football career. Florida State went on to win the ACC Championship Game against Louisville. Travis was named ACC Offensive Player of the Year and ACC Player of the Year while Norvell was named ACC Coach of the Year.

Despite winning the ACC title and finishing the regular season 13–0, the CFB Selection committee ranked Southeastern Conference (SEC) champions Alabama and Big 12 Conference champions Texas, both with 12–1 records, as the No. 4 & No. 3 playoff seeds, respectively, which not only snubbed Florida State (No. 5) from title contention, but also made them the first undefeated Power Five conference team to not be selected for (contested since the 2014 FBS season) national title contention. The CFP selection committee stated Florida State was left out of the playoffs because of the season-ending injury to Travis. The committee factors player availability into its selections—committee chairman Boo Corrigan said Florida State was "a different team" without Travis. Following this exclusion, the university’s board of trustees initiated legal action against the ACC, challenging the conference’s Grant of Rights and its withdrawal fee (a penalty of $130 million, should a school leave the conference).

Florida State was instead invited to the Orange Bowl against Georgia, where they were defeated by the Bulldogs in the biggest loss in bowl history, following multiple opt-outs and transfers. Defensive end Jared Verse was later selected in the first round of the NFL Draft along with nine other Seminoles selected in the draft, while three others signed as undrafted free agents.

== Schedule ==
The 2023 season was the conference's first season since 2004 that its scheduling format included just one division.

Date	Time	Opponent	Rank	Site	TV	Result	Attendance	Source
September 3	7:30 p.m.	vs. No. 5 LSU*	No. 8	Camping World Stadium; Orlando, FL (Camping World Kickoff)	ABC	W 45–24	65,429	
September 9	8:30 p.m.	Southern Miss*	No. 4	Doak Campbell Stadium; Tallahassee, FL	ACCN	W 66–13	74,467	
September 16	12:00 p.m.	at Boston College	No. 3	Alumni Stadium; Chestnut Hill, MA	ABC	W 31–29	41,383	
September 23	12:00 p.m.	at Clemson	No. 4	Memorial Stadium; Clemson, SC (rivalry)	ABC	W 31–24 ^{OT}	81,500	
October 7	3:30 p.m.	Virginia Tech	No. 4	Doak Campbell Stadium; Tallahassee, FL	ABC	W 39–17	79,560	
October 14	12:00 p.m.	Syracuse	No. 4	Doak Campbell Stadium; Tallahassee, FL	ABC	W 41–3	79,560	
October 21	7:30 p.m.	No. 16 Duke^{†}	No. 4	Doak Campbell Stadium; Tallahassee, FL	ABC	W 38–20	79,560	
October 28	12:00 p.m.	at Wake Forest	No. 4	Allegacy Federal Credit Union Stadium; Winston-Salem, NC	ABC	W 41–16	31,288	
November 4	3:30 p.m.	at Pittsburgh	No. 4	Acrisure Stadium; Pittsburgh, PA	ESPN	W 24–7	57,557	
November 11	3:30 p.m.	Miami (FL)	No. 4	Doak Campbell Stadium; Tallahassee, FL (rivalry)	ABC	W 27–20	79,560	
November 18	6:30 p.m.	North Alabama*	No. 4	Doak Campbell Stadium; Tallahassee, FL	The CW	W 58–13	79,560	
November 25	7:00 p.m.	at Florida*	No. 5	Ben Hill Griffin Stadium; Gainesville, FL (rivalry)	ESPN	W 24–15	90,341	
December 2	8:00 p.m.	vs. No. 14 Louisville	No. 4	Bank of America Stadium; Charlotte, NC (ACC Championship Game)	ABC	W 16–6	62,314	
December 30	4:00 p.m.	vs. No. 6 Georgia*	No. 5	Hard Rock Stadium; Miami Gardens, FL (Orange Bowl)	ESPN	L 3–63	63,324	
*Non-conference game; ^{†}Homecoming; Rankings from AP Poll (and CFP Rankings, after October 31) – Released prior to game; All times are in Eastern time

== Roster ==
2023 Florida State Seminoles football team roster
Players
Coaches
Offense

Pos.	#	Name	Class
WR	0	Ja'Khi Douglas	Jr
RB	3	Trey Benson	Jr
WR	4	Keon Coleman	Jr
WR	5	Deuce Spann	Jr
TE	6	Jaheim Bell	Jr
WR	7	Destyn Hill	Fr
WR	8	Hykeem Williams	Fr
RB	9	Lawrance Toafili	Jr
QB	10	AJ Duffy	Fr
QB	11	Brock Glenn	Fr
QB	12	Michael Grant	Fr
QB	13	Jordan Travis	Sr
WR	14	Johnny Wilson	Jr
QB	16	Dylan McNamara	Fr
QB	18	Tate Rodemaker	Jr
WR	19	Vandrevius Jacobs	Fr
WR	21	Darion Williamson	Jr
RB	22	CJ Campbell Jr.	So
RB	26	Caziah Holmes	Jr
RB	28	Samuel Singleton Jr.	Fr
RB	29	Rodney Hill	Fr
WR	31	Solomon Lowery Jr.	Fr
WR	32	Jeremiah Giedrys	Jr
RB	33	Demetric Stephens	Fr
TE	39	Vance Nicklaus	So
TE	45	Preston Daniel	Jr
TE	47	Jimmy Casey	Fr
TE	48	Jackson West	So
OL	52	Robert Scott Jr.	Jr
OL	53	Maurice Smith	Jr
OL	54	Jaylen Early	Fr
OL	55	Qae'shon Sapp	Fr
OL	58	Bless Harris	Sr
OL	63	Jeremiah Byers	Jr
OL	64	David Stickle	Jr
OL	65	Andre' Otto	Fr
OL	66	Ben Ostaszewski	Jr
OL	67	Thomas Shrader	Jr
OL	68	LaNard Toney	Fr
OL	69	Kanaya Charlton	Fr
OL	70	Casey Roddick	Sr
OL	71	D'Mitri Emmanuel	Sr
OL	72	Julian Armella	Fr
OL	75	Keiondre Jones	Jr
OL	76	Darius Washington	Jr
OL	77	Bryson Estes	So
OL	78	Daughtry Richardson	Fr
OL	79	Lucas Simmons	Fr
WR	80	Goldie Lawrence	Fr
WR	81	Joshua Burrell	So
WR	82	Carson Pielock	Fr
WR	83	Zamari McKenley	Fr
TE	84	Kyle Morlock	Jr
TE	85	Markeston Douglas	Jr
TE	86	Brian Courtney	So
WR	87	Xavier Johnson	Jr
WR	88	Kentron Poitier	Jr
TE	89	Jerrale Powers	Fr

Defense

Pos.	#	Name	Class
DT	0	Fabien Lovett	Sr
DB	1	Akeem Dent	Sr
DB	3	Kevin Knowles II	Jr
LB	4	Kalen DeLoach	Sr
DE	5	Jared Verse	Jr
DL	6	Dennis Briggs Jr	Sr
CB	7	Jarrian Jones	Sr
CB	8	Renardo Green	Sr
LB	10	DJ Lundy	Jr
DE	11	Patrick Payton	So
DB	12	Conrad Hussey	Fr
DB	13	Edwin Joseph	Fr
DL	14	Darrell Jackson Jr.	Jr
LB	15	Tatum Bethune	Sr
DB	16	Quindarrius Jones	Fr
LB	18	Blake Nichelson	Fr
DL	19	Gilber Edmond	Jr
DB	20	Azareye'h Thomas	So
DB	21	Greedy Vance Jr.	Jr
DL	22	Jaden Jones	So
CB	23	Fentrell Cypress	Jr
DB	24	K.J. Kirkland	Fr
DB	26	Dwayne Wells Jr.	Sr
DB	27	Ashlynd Barker	Fr
LB	28	Justin Cryer	Fr
DB	30	Ja'Bril Rawls	Fr
LB	31	DeMarco Ward	Fr
DB	32	Peter Warrick Jr.	So
LB	35	Dylan Brown-Turner	Fr
LB	36	Omar Graham Jr.	Fr
DB	37	Christian White	Fr
DB	38	Shyheim Brown	So
DB	39	Jaden Floyd	So
LB	41	AJ Cottrill	Fr
DB	42	Harold Stubbs IV	Fr
DB	43	Danj Altine	Sr
DT	44	Joshua Farmer	So
DL	45	Lamont Green Jr.	Fr
LB	46	Ashton Bracewell	Fr
DB	47	Donny Hiebert	Fr
DB	48	Jayden Bradford	Fr
LB	53	Brandon Torres	Fr
DL	54	Byron Turner Jr.	So
DL	55	Braden Fiske	Sr
DL	56	KJ Sampson	Fr
DL	57	Aaron Hester	Fr
LB	58	Emile Aime	So
DL	89	Xavier Perkins	Fr
DL	91	Ayobami Tifase	Fr
DL	92	Liam McCormick	So
DL	93	Malakai Menzer	Jr
DL	94	George Sklavenitis	Fr
DL	95	Daniel Lyons	Fr
DL	96	Dante Anderson	Fr
DL	97	Dylan Brown	Sr
DL	98	Grant Fielder	Fr
DL	99	Malcolm Ray	Jr

Special teams

Pos.	#	Name	Class
P	29	Alex Mastromanno	Jr
P	43	Mac Chiumento	Fr
LS	49	James Rosenberry Jr.	Sr
LS	60	Peyton Naylor	Fr
LS	61	Mason Arnold	So
K	88	Ryan Fitzgerald	Jr
K	98	Tyler Keltner	Sr
K	99	Max Larson	So

Head coach

- Mike Norvell

Coordinators/assistant coaches

- Alex Atkins – Offensive coordinator / offensive line
- Adam Fuller – Defensive coordinator
- John Papuchis – Special teams coordinator / defensive ends
- Randy Shannon – Co-Defensive coordinator / linebackers
- Chris Thomsen – Deputy head coach / tight ends
- Odell Haggins – Associate head coach / defensive tackles
- Ron Dugans – Wide receivers
- David Johnson – Running backs / recruiting coordinator
- Patrick Surtain Sr. – Defensive backs
- Tony Tokarz – Quarterbacks
- Guy Lemonier Jr. – Graduate assistant (offense)
- Malik Slater – Graduate assistant (defense)
- Cooper Williams – Graduate assistant (offense)
- Andrew Wilson – Graduate assistant (defense)

Legend

- (C) Team captain
- (S) Suspended
- (I) Ineligible
- Injured
- Redshirt

Roster

== Coaching staff ==
Florida State Seminoles coaches

Head coach

- Mike Norvell

Assistant coaches

- Alex Atkins – Offensive coordinator/offensive line
- Adam Fuller – Co-defensive coordinator
- Randy Shannon – Co-defensive coordinator/linebackers
- John Papuchis – Special teams/defensive ends
- Chris Thomsen – Deputy head coach/tight ends
- Odell Haggins – Associate head coach/defensive tackles
- Tony Tokarz – Quarterbacks
- Ron Dugans – Wide receivers
- David Johnson – Running backs/recruiting coordinator
- Patrick Surtain – Defensive backs/defensive passing game coordinator
- Josh Storms – Strength and conditioning

== Awards ==
=== Watchlists ===
Award	Player
Dodd Trophy	Mike Norvell
Paul "Bear" Bryant Award	Mike Norvell
Broyles Award	Adam Fuller
Lott Trophy	Jared Verse
Maxwell Award	Jordan Travis; Trey Benson; Keon Coleman
Outland Trophy	Jeremiah Byers
Bronko Nagurski Trophy	Jared Verse; Fentrell Cypress
Ray Guy Award	Alex Mastromanno
Paul Hornung Award	Trey Benson
Rimington Trophy	Maurice Smith
Mackey Award	Jaheim Bell
Biletnikoff Award	Johnny Wilson; Keon Coleman
Davey O’Brien Award	Jordan Travis
Doak Walker Award	Trey Benson
Butkus Award	Tatum Bethune
Jim Thorpe Award	Fentrell Cypress
Walter Camp Award	Jordan Travis; Jared Verse
Bednarik Award	Jared Verse
Lombardi Award	D’Mitri Emmanuel; Jared Verse
Manning Award	Jordan Travis
Johnny Unitas Golden Arm Award	Jordan Travis
Campbell Trophy	Preston Daniel
Wuerffel Trophy	Jared Verse
Jason Witten Award	Jordan Travis
Preseason All-ACC	Trey Benson; Fentrell Cypress; Jared Verse; Johnny Wilson
Preseason All-American	Jared Verse
Midseason All-American	Keon Coleman
Senior Bowl	Jaheim Bell; Trey Benson; Tatum Bethune; Dennis Briggs, Jr. Fentrell Cyprus II; Kalen DeLoach; Akeem Dent; Braden Fiske; Rinardo Green; Fabien Lovett, Sr. Robert Scott, Jr. Jordan Travis; Jared Verse; Johnny Wilson

=== Honors ===
Weekly Honors
Player	Award	Ref.
Jordan Travis	ACC Quarterback of the Week (Week One); Davey O’Brien National Quarterback of the Week (Week One); Davey O’Brien National Quarterback of the Week (Week Four); ACC Co-Quarterback of the Week (Week Eight); Davey O’Brien National Quarterback of the Week (Week Eight); Manning National Quarterback of the Week (Week Eight); Davey O’Brien National Quarterback of the Week (Week Nine); Manning National Quarterback of the Week (Week Nine); ACC Quarterback of the Week (Week Ten)	
Keon Coleman	ACC Receiver of the Week (Week One); ACC Specialist of the Week (Week Seven)	
Bless Harris	ACC Offensive Lineman of the Week (Week One)	
D’Mitri Emmanuel	ACC Co-Offensive Lineman of the Week (Week Two)	
Kalen DeLoach	ACC Linebacker of the Week (Week Four); ACC Linebacker of the Week (Week Eleven)	
Renardo Green	ACC Co-Defensive Back of the Week (Week Four)	
Trey Benson	ACC Running Back of the Week (Week Six); Doak Walker National Running Back of the Week (Week Six); ACC Running Back of the Week (Week Thirteen)	
Darius Washington	ACC Offensive Lineman of the Week (Week Six)	
Deuce Spann	ACC Specialist of the Week (Week Eight)	
Ja’Khi Douglas	ACC Receiver of the Week (Week Ten)	
Jared Verse	ACC Defensive Lineman of the Week (Week Thirteen)	

Yearly Honors
Player	Award	Ref.
Renardo Green	Jim Thorpe Award semifinalist All-ACC Second Team - Defense	
Jared Verse	Lombardi Award semifinalist Lott Trophy semifinalist All-ACC First Team - Defense; Associated Press Second Team All-American; AFCA First Team All-American; ESPN Second Team All-American; ESPN Top Player of the Year	
Ryan Fitzgerald	Lou Groza Award semifinalist All-ACC Third Team - Specialists	
Jordan Travis	Maxwell Award finalist Davey O’Brien Award semifinalist Walter Camp Award semifinalist Heisman Trophy semifinalist All-ACC First Team - Offense; USA Today ACC Player of the Year; Associated Press ACC Offensive Player of the Year; ACC Player of the Year; ACC Offensive Player of the Year; ESPN Top Player of the Year	
Alex Mastromanno	Ray Guy Award finalist All-ACC Second Team - Specialists; CBS Sports Second-Team All American; Sporting News Second Team All-American	
Keon Coleman	Biletnikoff Award semifinalist All-ACC First Team - Offense/Specialists; USA Today ACC Newcomer of the Year; Associated Press ACC Newcomer of the Year; ESPN Top Player of the Year	
D'Mitri Emmanuel, Jeremiah Byers, Casey Roddick, Maurice Smith, Darius Washington, Robert Scott Jr., Keiondre Jones, Bless Harris	Joe Moore Award semifinalists	
Adam Fuller	Broyles Award semifinalist	
Darius Washington	All-ACC First Team - Offense	
D'Mitri Emmanuel	All-ACC First Team - Offense	
Kalen DeLoach	All-ACC First Team - Defense; ESPN Top Player of the Year	
Trey Benson	All-ACC Second Team - Offense; ESPN Top Player of the Year	
Jaheim Bell	All-ACC Second Team - Offense	
Braden Fiske	All-ACC Second Team - Defense; Associated Press Third Team All-American	
Joshua Farmer	All-ACC Second Team - Defense	
Johnny Wilson	All-ACC Third Team - Offense	
Tatum Bethune	All-ACC Third Team - Defense	
Shyheim Brown	All-ACC Third Team - Defense	
Casey Roderick	All-ACC Honorable Mention	
Maurice Smith	All-ACC Honorable Mention	
Patrick Payton	All-ACC Honorable Mention	
D.J. Lundy	All-ACC Honorable Mention	
Jarrian Jones	All-ACC Honorable Mention	
Fentrell Cypress	All-ACC Honorable Mention	
Akeem Dent	All-ACC Honorable Mention	
James Rosenberry, Jr.	AFCA First Team All-American	
Mike Norvell	ACC Coach of the Year; Associated Press ACC Coach of the Year; AFCA Regional Coach of the Year; Dodd Trophy winner Paul "Bear" Bryant Award winner George Munger Coach of the Year Award finalist Eddie Robinson Award finalist	
Patrick Surtain	Defensive Backs Coach of the Year	
Tony Tokarz	ACC Quarterback Coach of the Year	
Darrick Yray	Player Personnel Director of the Year	
Jeff Kupper	Football Operations Director of the Year	
Lawrance Toafili	ACC Championship Game MVP	

== Players drafted into the NFL ==
Round	Pick	Player	Position	NFL Club
1	19	Jared Verse	DE	Los Angeles Rams
2	33	Keon Coleman	WR	Buffalo Bills
2	39	Braden Fiske	DT	Los Angeles Rams
2	64	Renardo Green	CB	San Francisco 49ers
3	66	Trey Benson	RB	Arizona Cardinals
3	96	Jarrian Jones	CB	Jacksonville Jaguars
5	171	Jordan Travis	QB	New York Jets
6	185	Johnny Wilson	WR	Philadelphia Eagles
7	231	Jaheim Bell	TE	New England Patriots
7	251	Tatum Bethune	LB	San Francisco 49ers

== Rankings ==
Ranking movements Legend: ██ Increase in ranking ██ Decrease in ranking т = Tied with team above or below ( ) = First-place votes
	Week															
Poll	Pre	1	2	3	4	5	6	7	8	9	10	11	12	13	14	Final
AP	8	4 (3)	3 (3)	4 (1)	5 (3)	5 (4)	4 (1)	4 (1)	4 (3)	4 (3)	4 (2)	4	5	4	4	6 т
Coaches	8	5	3	3	4	5	4	4	4	4	4	4	4	4	3	6
CFP	Not released									4	4	4	5	4	5	Not released
