= 2022 South Carolina Gamecocks football team =

American college football season

2022 South Carolina Gamecocks football

Palmetto Bowl champion

Gator Bowl, L 38–45 vs. Notre Dame
- Conference: Southeastern Conference
- East Division

Ranking
- Coaches: No. 23
- AP: No. 23
- Record: 8–5 (4–4 SEC)
- Head coach: Shane Beamer (2nd season)
- Offensive coordinator: Marcus Satterfield (2nd season)
- Offensive scheme: Spread
- Defensive coordinator: Clayton White (2nd season)
- Base defense: 4–2–5
- Home stadium: Williams–Brice Stadium

Uniform
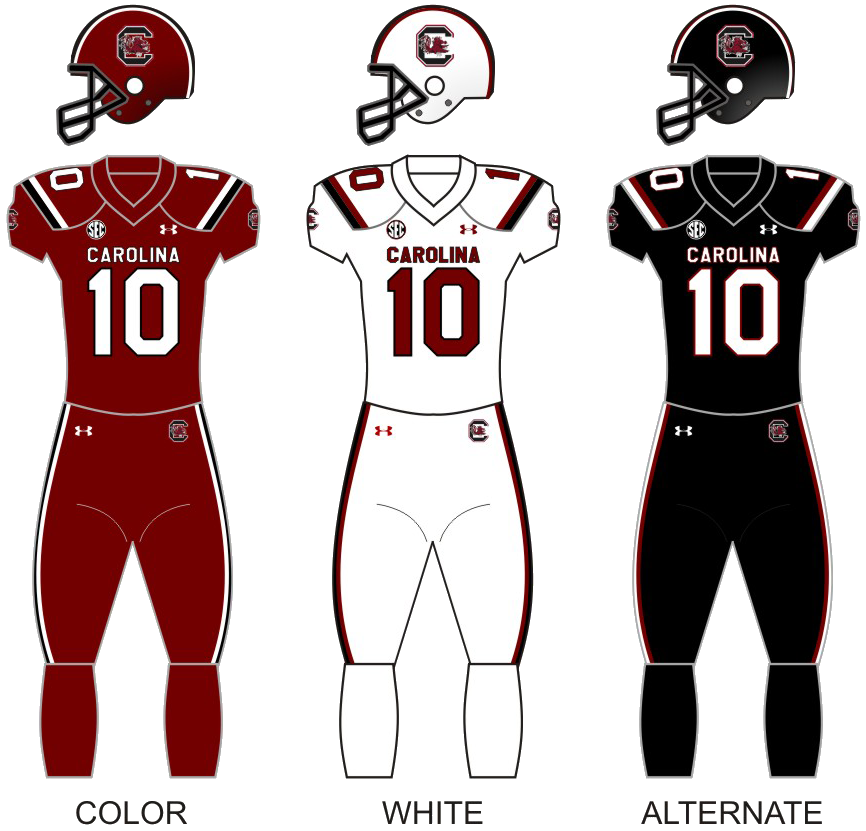

2022 Southeastern Conference football standings
	Conf.			Overall
Team	W		L	W		L
Eastern Division
No. 1 Georgia xy$#^	8	–	0	15	–	0
No. 6 Tennessee	6	–	2	11	–	2
No. 23 South Carolina	4	–	4	8	–	5
Kentucky	3	–	5	7	–	6
Florida	3	–	5	6	–	7
Missouri	3	–	5	6	–	7
Vanderbilt	2	–	6	5	–	7
Western Division
No. 16 LSU xy	6	–	2	10	–	4
No. 5 Alabama x	6	–	2	11	–	2
No. 20 Mississippi State	4	–	4	9	–	4
Ole Miss	4	–	4	8	–	5
Arkansas	3	–	5	7	–	6
Auburn	2	–	6	5	–	7
Texas A&M	2	–	6	5	–	7
Championship: Georgia 50, LSU 30
# – College Football Playoff champion; ^ – College Football Playoff participant; $ – Conference champion; x – Division champion/co-champions; y – Championship game participant; Rankings from AP Poll

The 2022 South Carolina Gamecocks football team represented the University of South Carolina in the 2022 NCAA Division I FBS football season. This season marked the Gamecocks' 129th overall season, and 31st as a member of the SEC East Division. The Gamecocks played their home games at Williams–Brice Stadium in Columbia, South Carolina, and were led by second-year head coach Shane Beamer.

The 2022 Gamecocks squad displayed significant growth under Shane Beamer's leadership in his second year as head coach. Despite inconsistent production and a lackluster rush defense throughout the season, the Gamecocks finished on a high note, posting an 8–5 record and finishing the season ranked at No. 23 in both the Coaches and AP poll.

The Gamecocks' eight wins were the most since 2017. Along the way, they won four consecutive games, won three true road games, defeated archrival Clemson, and finished ranked, all for the first time since 2013. Additionally, they defeated Texas A&M, three top-15 teams, and back-to-back top-ten opponents, all for the first time in program history.

The consecutive victories over No. 5 Tennessee and No. 8 Clemson have been described as "two of the biggest upsets in program history". Hosting Tennessee, South Carolina's dominant 63–38 victory set the record for most points scored by an unranked team against a top-five team in college football history. Quarterback Spencer Rattler's six touchdowns broke the school record for most touchdown passes in a single game. South Carolina fans stormed the field for the first time since 2001. (Note: The Greenville News reported that the last field storming at Williams–Brice was South Carolina's upset over Alabama in 2010. However, the SEC officially said that South Carolina has had only two "access to competition area" violations since fines began in 2004: a men's basketball game against Kentucky in 2014, and the football game against Tennessee in 2022. In 2016, Saturday Down South reported that South Carolina's last field storming was in 2001.) At Clemson, South Carolina snapped the Tigers' 40-game home winning streak. It was also the Gamecocks' first win over Clemson since 2013. It was just the seventh time in history that a school had defeated AP top-ten opponents in consecutive weeks as an unranked team, and the first since 2003.

The 2022 special teams have also been considered arguably the greatest Gamecock special teams of all time, earning the No. 1 spot in ESPN's efficiency ranking.

== Schedule ==
South Carolina and the SEC announced the 2022 football schedule on September 21, 2021.

Date	Time	Opponent	Rank	Site	TV	Result	Attendance
September 3	7:30 p.m.	Georgia State*		Williams–Brice Stadium; Columbia, SC	SECN+/ESPN+	W 35–14	78,297
September 10	12:00 p.m.	at No. 16 Arkansas		Donald W. Reynolds Razorback Stadium; Fayetteville, AR	ESPN	L 30–44	72,437
September 17	12:00 p.m.	No. 1 Georgia		Williams–Brice Stadium; Columbia, SC (rivalry)	ESPN	L 7–48	78,212
September 24	7:30 p.m.	Charlotte*		Williams–Brice Stadium; Columbia, SC	ESPNU	W 56–20	77,982
September 29 (Note: The South Carolina State game was moved up by two days due to Hurricane Ian.)	7:00 p.m.	South Carolina State*		Williams–Brice Stadium; Columbia, SC	SECN	W 50–10	61,551
October 8	7:30 p.m.	at No. 13 Kentucky		Kroger Field; Lexington, KY	SECN	W 24–14	61,612
October 22	7:30 p.m.	Texas A&M		Williams–Brice Stadium; Columbia, SC (Bonham Trophy)	SECN	W 30–24	77,837
October 29	4:00 p.m.	Missouri^{†}	No. 25	Williams–Brice Stadium; Columbia, SC (Mayor's Cup)	SECN	L 10–23	77,578
November 5	7:30 p.m.	at Vanderbilt		FirstBank Stadium; Nashville, TN	SECN	W 38–27	28,553
November 12	4:00 p.m.	at Florida		Ben Hill Griffin Stadium; Gainesville, FL	SECN	L 6–38	89,454
November 19	7:00 p.m.	No. 5 Tennessee		Williams–Brice Stadium; Columbia, SC (rivalry / SEC Nation)	ESPN	W 63–38	79,041
November 26	12:00 p.m.	at No. 8 Clemson*		Memorial Stadium; Clemson, SC (rivalry)	ABC	W 31–30	81,500
December 30	3:30 p.m.	vs. No. 21 Notre Dame*	No. 19	TIAA Bank Field; Jacksonville, FL (Gator Bowl)	ESPN	L 38–45	67,383
*Non-conference game; ^{†}Homecoming; Rankings from AP Poll (and CFP Rankings, after November 1) - Released prior to game; All times are in Eastern time

== Game summaries ==
=== at No. 16 Arkansas ===
Game Two – South Carolina Gamecocks (1–0) at No. 16 Arkansas Razorbacks (1–0)

Quarter	1	2	3	4	Total
Gamecocks	3	6	7	14	30
No. 16 Razorbacks	7	14	0	23	44

at Donald W. Reynolds Razorback Stadium • Fayetteville, Arkansas

- Date: Saturday, September 10, 2022
- Game time: 11:00 a.m. CST
- Game weather: Sunny • Temperature: 75 °F (24 °C) • Wind: SW 3 mph
- Game attendance: 72,437
- Referee: David Smith
- TV announcers (ESPN): Bob Wischusen (play-by-play), Dan Orlovsky (analyst), Kris Budden (sideline)

Game information

First quarter

- (6:42) Arkansas – Raheim Sanders 1 yard run, Cam Little kick (Drive: 13 plays, 63 yards, 5:38; Arkansas 7–0)
- (3:32) South Carolina – Mitch Jeter 28 yard field goal (Drive: 6 plays, 65 yards, 3:10; Arkansas 7–3)

Second quarter

- (14:28) Arkansas – Raheim Sanders 11 yard run, Cam Little kick (Drive: 12 plays, 75 yards, 4:04; Arkansas 14–3)
- (8:13) Arkansas – Rashod Dubinion 1 yard run, Cam Little kick (Drive: 12 plays, 61 yards, 4:53; Arkansas 21–3)
- (2:56) South Carolina – MarShawn Lloyd 7 yard run, Mitch Jeter PAT failed (Drive: 11 plays, 70 yards, 5:17; Arkansas 21–9)

Third quarter

- (8:51) South Carolina – Antwane Wells 62 yard pass from Spencer Rattler, Mitch Jeter kick (Drive: 8 plays, 88 yards, 2:55; Arkansas 21–16)

Fourth quarter

- (14:55) Arkansas – KJ Jefferson 2 yard run, Cam Little kick (Drive: 14 plays, 59 yards, 5:17; Arkansas 28–16)
- (12:09) Arkansas – KJ Jefferson 23 yard pass from Warren Thompson, Cam Little kick (Drive: 5 plays, 41 yards, 1:57; Arkansas 35–16)
- (6:25) South Carolina – Juju McDowell 1 yard run, 2-PT pass (Spencer Rattler to Ahmarean Brown) (Drive: 3 plays, 76 yards, 1:14; Arkansas 35–24)
- (6:00) Arkansas – A.J. Green 1 yard run, Cam Little kick (Drive: 2 plays, 9 yards, 0:25; Arkansas 42–24)
- (3:21) South Carolina – Jaheim Bell 1 yard rush, 2-PT failed (Drive: 10 plays, 75 yards, 2:39; Arkansas 42–30)
- (1:33) Arkansas – Spencer Rattler committed intentional grounding in end zone, safety (Arkansas 44–30)

Statistics	SC	ARK
First downs	22	27
Plays–yards	67–411	86–457
Rushes–yards	29–40	65–295
Passing yards	371	162
Passing: comp–att–int	23–38–1	18–21–0
Turnovers		
Time of possession	25:23	34:37

Team	Category	Player	Statistics
South Carolina	Passing	Spencer Rattler	23–38, 371 yards, 1 TD, 1 INT
South Carolina	Rushing	Juju McDowell	6 carries, 35 yards, 1 TD
South Carolina	Receiving	Antwane Wells Jr.	8 receptions, 185 yards, 1 TD
Arkansas	Passing	KJ Jefferson	18–21, 162 yards, 1 TD
Arkansas	Rushing	Raheim Sanders	24 carries, 156 yards, 2 TD
Arkansas	Receiving	Matt Landers	4 receptions, 45 yards

=== vs. No. 1 Georgia (rivalry) ===
Game Three – No. 1 Georgia Bulldogs (2–0) vs. South Carolina Gamecocks (1–1)

Quarter	1	2	3	4	Total
No. 1 Georgia	14	10	21	3	48
South Carolina	0	0	0	7	7

at Williams-Brice Stadium • Columbia, South Carolina

- Date: Saturday, September 17, 2022
- Game time: 12:00 p.m. EST
- Game weather: Clear • Temperature: – • Wind:
- Game attendance: 78,212
- Referee: Jason Autrey
- TV announcers (ESPN): Sean McDonough (play-by-play), Todd Blackledge (color) and Molly McGrath (sideline)

Game information

First quarter

- (8:20) UGA – Brock Bowers 5 Yd Run (Jack Podlesny Kick) (Georgia 7–0)
- (4:42) UGA – Kendall Milton 1 Yd Run (Jack Podlesny Kick) (Georgia 14–0)

Second quarter

- (11:25) UGA – Brock Bowers 6 Yd pass from Stetson Bennett (Jack Podlesny Kick) (Georgia 21–0)
- (0:30) UGA – Jack Podlesny 42 Yd Field Goal (Georgia 24–0)

Third quarter

- (13:21) UGA – Brock Bowers 78 Yd pass from Stetson Bennett (Jack Podlesny Kick) (Georgia 31–0)
- (7:13) UGA – Stetson Bennett 11 Yd Run (Jack Podlesny Kick) (Georgia 38–0)
- (6:00) UGA – Oscar Delp 28 Yd pass from Carson Beck (Jack Podlesny Kick) (Georgia 45–0)

Fourth quarter

- (8:57) UGA – Jared Zirkel 21 Yd Field Goal (Georgia 38–0)
- (0:53) SC – Traevon Kenion 13 Yd pass from Luke Doty (Mitch Jeter Kick)(Georgia 48–7)

Statistics	UGA	SC
First downs	30	17
Plays–yards	65–547	64–306
Rushes–yards	208	92
Passing yards	339	214
Passing: comp–att–int	21–30	19–34–3
Turnovers		
Time of possession	30:40	29:20

Team	Category	Player	Statistics
Georgia	Passing	Stetson Bennett	16/23, 284 yards, 2 TD
Georgia	Rushing	Stetson Bennett	3 carries, 36 yards, 1 TD
Georgia	Receiving	Brock Bowers	5 receptions, 121 yards, 2 TD
South Carolina	Passing	Spencer Rattler	13/25, 118 yards, 2 INT
South Carolina	Rushing	Juju McDowell	8 carry, 33 yards
South Carolina	Receiving	Jalen Brooks	5 receptions, 53 yards

=== vs. Texas A&M (rivalry) ===
Game Seven – Texas A&M Aggies (3–3) at South Carolina Gamecocks (4–2) – Game summary

Quarter	1	2	3	4	Total
Aggies	3	11	7	3	24
Gamecocks	17	0	7	6	30

at Williams–Brice Stadium, Columbia, South Carolina

- Date: Saturday, October 22, 2022
- Game time: 6:30 p.m. CDT / 7:30 EDT
- Game weather: Clear, 63 °F (17 °C)
- Game attendance: 77,837
- Referee: Lee Hedrick
- TV announcers (SECN): Tom Hart, Jordan Rodgers and Cole Cubelic
- Box score, Recap

Game information
First quarter
- SC – Xavier Legette 100-yard kickoff return (Mitch Jeter kick), 14:46. Gamecocks 7–0.
- SC – Mitch Jeter 23-yard field goal, 12:22. Gamecocks 10–0. Drive: 4 plays, 0 yards, 0:50.
- SC – Christian Beal-Smith 5-yard run (Mitch Jeter kick), 9:51. Gamecocks 17–0. Drive: 4 plays, 19 yards, 1:44.
- TAMU – Randy Bond 51-yard field goal, 6:28. Gamecocks 17–3. Drive: 8 plays, 41 yards, 3:23.

Second quarter

- TAMU – Randy Bond 26-yard field goal, 13:30. Gamecocks 17–6. Drive: 6 plays, 20 yards, 2:55.
- TAMU – Max Wright 9-yard pass from Haynes King (Haynes King pass to Evan Stewart), 2:00. Gamecocks 17–14. Drive: 13 plays, 94 yards, 8:04.

Third quarter

- SC – MarShawn Lloyd 18-yard run (Mitch Jeter kick), 3:25. Gamecocks 24–14. Drive: 6 plays, 51 yards, 2:47.
- TAMU – De’Von Achane 15-yard run (Randy Bond kick), 0:27. Gamecocks 24–21. Drive: 3 plays, 24 yards, 1:21.

Fourth quarter

- SC – MarShawn Lloyd 18-yard run (kick blocked), 3:08. Gamecocks 30–21. Drive: 8 plays, 80 yards, 5:13.
- TAMU – Randy Bond 28-yard field goal, 0:10. Gamecocks 30–24. Drive: 7 plays, 83 yards, 0:51.

Statistics

Statistics	TAMU	SC
First downs	23	13
Total yards	398	286
Rushing yards	129	118
Passing yards	269	168
Turnovers	2	2
Time of possession	33:08	26:52

Team	Category	Player	Statistics
Texas A&M	Passing	Haynes King	17/32, 178 yards, TD, INT
Texas A&M	Rushing	De’Von Achane	20 rushes, 99 yards, TD
Texas A&M	Receiving	Evan Stewart	6 receptions, 87 yards
South Carolina	Passing	Spencer Rattler	12/25, 168 yards
South Carolina	Rushing	MarShawn Lloyd	18 rushes, 92 yards, 2 TD
South Carolina	Receiving	Austin Stogner	3 receptions, 46 yards

=== at Florida ===
Game Ten – South Carolina Gamecocks (6–3) at Florida Gators (5–4) – Game summary

Quarter	1	2	3	4	Total
Gamecocks	0	6	0	0	6
Gators	21	3	7	7	38

at Ben Hill Griffin Stadium • Gainesville, FL

- Date: Saturday November 12, 2022
- Game time: 4:00 p.m. EST
- Game weather: Sunny
- Game attendance: 89,454
- Referee: Lee Hedrick
- TV announcers (SECN): Taylor Zarzour (play-by-play), Matt Stinchcomb (color), Alyssa Lang (sideline reporter)
- Box score, Recap

Game information

First quarter

- Florida – Anthony Richardson 3-yard run (Adam Mihalek kick), 9:17
- Florida – Ricky Pearsall 15-yard pass from Anthony Richardson (Adam Mihalek kick), 4:31
- Florida – Trevor Etienne 85-yard run (Adam Mihalek kick), 1:59

Second quarter

- Florida – Adam Mihalek 28-yard field goal, 6:24
- South Carolina – Dakereon Joyner 48-yard pass from Kai Kroeger, 1:52

Third quarter

- Florida – Jonathan Odom 4-yard pass from Anthony Richardson (Adam Mihalek kick), 9:43

Fourth quarter

- Florida – Montrell Johnson Jr. 8-yard run (Adam Mihalek kick), 6:02

Statistics	SC	FLA
First downs	11	26
Plays–yards	50–237	79–515
Rushes–yards	23–44	54–374
Passing yards	193	141
Passing: comp–att–int	19–27–0	13–25–0
Turnovers		
Time of possession	23:40	36:20

Team	Category	Player	Statistics
South Carolina	Passing	Spencer Rattler	18–26, 145 yards
South Carolina	Rushing	Jaheim Bell	12 carries, 30 yards
South Carolina	Receiving	Dakereon Joyner	2 receptions, 73 yards, 1 TD
Florida	Passing	Anthony Richardson	11–23, 112 yards, 2 TD
Florida	Rushing	Montrell Johnson Jr.	24 carries, 161 yards, 1 TD
Florida	Receiving	Caleb Douglas	3 receptions, 53 yards

=== at No. 8 Clemson (rivalry) ===
Game Twelve – South Carolina Gamecocks (7–4) at No. 8 Clemson Tigers (10–1) − Game summary

Quarter	1	2	3	4	Total
Gamecocks	0	14	14	3	31
No. 8 Tigers	14	9	7	0	30

at Memorial Stadium • Clemson, SC

- Date: November 26, 2022
- Game time: 12:00 p.m.
- Game weather: Temperature: 61 °F (16 °C) • Wind: Southeast @ 3 mph (4.8 km/h) • Weather: Sunny
- Game attendance: 81,500
- Referee: Matt Loeffler
- TV announcers (ABC): Sean McDonough (play-by-play), Todd Blackledge (analyst), and Molly McGrath (sideline)
- Box score, Recap

Game information
First quarter
- CLEM – Jeremiah Trotter Jr. 35 yard interception return, (B. T. Potter PAT), 12:15. Tigers 7–0. Drive: 1 play, 35 yards, 00:08.
- CLEM – DJ Uiagalelei 9 yard run, (Potter PAT), 5:52. Tigers 14–0. Drive: 8 plays, 90 yards, 4:08.

Second quarter

- USC – Spencer Rattler 4 yard pass to Antwane Wells Jr., (Mitch Jeter PAT), 13:59. Tigers 14–7. Drive: 8 plays, 51 yards, 3:08.
- CLEM – Safety, 10:05. Tigers 16–7. Drive: 1 play, 0:06.
- USC – Rattler 4 yard urn, (Jeter PAT), 8:24. Tigers 16–14. Drive: 4 plays, 37 yards, 1:31.
- CLEM – Uiagalelei 11 yard pass to Antonio Williams, (Potter PAT), 6:14. Tigers 23–14. Drive: 5 plays, 75 yards, 2:10.

Third quarter

- USC – Jaheim Bell 2 yard run, (Jeter PAT), 12:06. Tigers 23–21. Drive: 4 plays, 26 yards, 1:52.
- CLEM – Will Shipley 11 yard run, 4:35. Tigers 30–21. Drive: 6 plays, 47 yards, 2:35.
- USC – Rattler 72 yard pass to Wells Jr., (Jeter PAT), 3:45. Tigers 30–28. Drive: 2 plays, 75 yards, 00:50.

Fourth quarter

- USC – Jeter 35 yard field goal, 10:54. Gamecocks 31–30. Drive: 10 plays, 54 yards, 6:21.

Statistics	SC	CLEM
First downs	14	17
Plays–yards	70–415	66–336
Rushes–yards	31–55	37–237
Passing yards	360	99
Passing: comp–att–int	25–39–2	8–29–1
Turnovers		
Time of possession	32:57	27:03

Team	Category	Player	Statistics
South Carolina	Passing	Spencer Rattler	25–39, 360 yards, 2 TD, 2 INT
South Carolina	Rushing	Jaheim Bell	9 carries, 29 yards, 1 TD
South Carolina	Receiving	Antwane Wells Jr.	9 receptions, 131 yards, 2 TD
Clemson	Passing	DJ Uiagalelei	8–29, 99 yards, 1 TD, 1 INT
Clemson	Rushing	Will Shipley	15 carries, 132 yards, 1 TD
Clemson	Receiving	Beaux Collins	2 receptions, 65 yards

=== vs. No. 21 Notre Dame (Gator Bowl) ===
Game Thirteen – No. 18 South Carolina Gamecocks (8–4) vs No. 21 Notre Dame Fighting Irish (8–4) – Game summary
(2022 TaxSlayer Gator Bowl)

Quarter	1	2	3	4	Total
No. 21 Fighting Irish	7	10	14	14	45
No. 18 Gamecocks	21	3	7	7	38

at TIAA Bank Field • Jacksonville, FL

- Date: December 30, 2022
- Game time: 3:30 p.m.
- Game weather: Partly cloudy, 70 °F (21 °C)
- Game attendance: 67,383
- Referee: Mike Cannon
- TV announcers (ESPN): Taylor Zarzour (play-by-play), Matt Stinchcomb (analyst), Alyssa Lang (sideline)

Game information

First Quarter

- (11:48) SC – Xavier Legette 13-yard pass from Spencer Rattler, Mitch Jeter kick (Drive: 10 plays, 75 yards, 3:12; South Carolina 7–0)
- (5:54) ND – Tyler Buchner 15-yard run, Blake Grupe kick (Drive: 10 plays, 50 yards, 3:37; Tied 7–7)
- (2:27) SC – Hunter Rogers 23-yard pass from Kai Kroeger, Mitch Jeter kick (Drive: 9 plays, 75 yards, 3:27; South Carolina 14–7)
- (0:44) SC – DQ Smith 47-yard interception return, Mitch Jeter kick (Drive: 5 plays, 19 yards, 1:43; South Carolina 21–7)

Second Quarter

- (8:36) ND – Blake Grupe 37-yard field goal (Drive: 12 plays, 56 yards, 7:08; South Carolina 21–10)
- (5:18) SC – Mitch Jeter 45-yard field goal (Drive: 10 plays, 48 yards, 3:18; South Carolina 24–10)
- (5:06) ND – Logan Diggs 75-yard pass from Tyler Buchner, Blake Grupe kick (Drive: 1 play, 75 yards, 0:12; South Carolina 24–17)

Third Quarter

- (10:28) ND – Tyler Buchner 11-yard run, Blake Grupe kick (Drive: 5 plays, 68 yards, 2:21; Tied 24–24)
- (8:31) SC – Xavier Legette 42-yard pass from Spencer Rattler, Mitch Jeter kick (Drive: 5 plays, 67 yards, 1:57; South Carolina 31–24)
- (0:31) ND – Braden Lenzy 44-yard pass from Tyler Buchner, Blake Grupe kick (Drive: 1 play, 44 yards, 0:08; Tied 31–31)

Fourth Quarter

- (12:41) ND – Logan Diggs 39-yard run, Blake Grupe kick (Drive: 7 plays, 73 yards, 2:13; Notre Dame 38–31)
- (7:42) SC – O'Donnell Fortune 100-yard interception return, Mitch Jeter kick (Drive: 6 plays, 53 yards, 3:27; Tied 38–38)
- (1:38) ND – Mitchell Evans 16-yard pass from Tyler Buchner, Blake Grupe kick (Drive: 12 plays, 80 yards, 6:04; Notre Dame 45–38)

Statistics	ND	SC
First downs	27	20
Total yards	558	352
Rushes/yards	46–264	22–65
Passing yards	294	287
Passing: Comp–Att–Int	19–34–3	31–49–1
Time of possession	36:39	23:21

Team	Category	Player	Statistics
Notre Dame	Passing	Tyler Buchner	18/33, 274 yards, 3 TD, 3 INT
Notre Dame	Rushing	Audric Estimé	14 carries, 95 yards
Notre Dame	Receiving	Braden Lenzy	4 receptions, 89 yards, TD
South Carolina	Passing	Spencer Rattler	29/46, 246 yards, 2 TD, INT
South Carolina	Rushing	Juju McDowell	6 carries, 28 yards
South Carolina	Receiving	Xavier Legette	7 receptions, 78 yards, 2 TD

== Roster ==
2022 South Carolina Gamecocks Football Roster
Quarterback: 4 Colton Gauthier – (redshirt) freshman (6'3, 215); 7 Spencer Rattler – (redshirt) junior (6'1, 215); 9 Luke Doty – junior (6'1, 210); 11 Braden Davis – freshman (6'5, 205); 15 Tanner Bailey – freshman (6'1, 205); 28 Jake Helfrich – (redshirt) freshman (6'0, 190); 29 Jalen Daniels – freshman (6'4, 215); Running back: 1 MarShawn Lloyd – (redshirt) sophomore (5'9, 212); 8 Christian Beal-Smith – (redshirt) sophomore (5'9, 205); 11 Lovasea Carroll – (redshirt) freshman (6'2, 205); 21 JuJu McDowell – sophomore (5'9, 180); 23 Rashad Amos – (redshirt) sophomore (6'2, 227); 25 Dante Miller – graduate (5'9, 200); 26 Nathan Harris-Waynick – (redshirt) freshman (5'10, 205); 27 D.J. Twitty – (redshirt) senior (6'0, 225); 32 Bradley Dunn – (redshirt) sophomore (5'9, 210); 35 Chase McCracken – freshman; Wide receiver: 3 Antwane Wells Jr. – junior (6'1, 207); 5 Dakereon Joyner – (redshirt) senior (6'1, 215); 6 Josh Vann – Fifth Year (5'11, 192); 10 Ahmarean Brown – senior (5'9, 167); 13 Jalen Brooks – Fifth Year (6'2, 205); 16 Corey Rucker – junior (6'1, 212); 17 Xavier Legette – senior (6'3, 220); 19 Ben Rollins – (redshirt) sophomore (5'9, 170); 20 Kylic Horton – freshman (6'4, 205); 24 Eriq Rice – (redshirt) freshman (6'1, 195); 31 DJ Black – freshman (6'1, 195); 81 Aaron Morton – (redshirt) freshman (5'8, 177); 82 Landon Samson – freshman (6'0, 195); 85 Payton Mangrum – (redshirt) sophomore (6'0, 198); 87 Joseph Morris – (redshirt) freshman (6'0, 195); 89 O'Mega Blake – (redshirt) freshman (6'2, 190); Placekicker: 30 Jack Luckhurst – (redshirt) junior (6'2, 185); 40 Alex Herrera – (redshirt) junior (6'2, 212); 42 Daniel Lester – freshman (6'2, 212); 98 Mitch Jeter – junior (5'10, 195); Punter: 39 Kai Kroeger – junior (6'4, 207); 45 William Joyce – (redshirt) freshman (6'3, 215)	Tight end: 0 Jaheim Bell – junior (6'3, 232); 12 Traveon Kenion – (redshirt) junior (6'4, 245); 18 Austin Stogner – graduate (6'5, 250); 22 Zavier Short – freshman (6'2, 220); 44 Nate Adkins – graduate (6'3, 252); 49 Dave Adams – (redshirt) sophomore (6'2, 230); 86 Chad Terrell – Sixth Year (6'3, 237); 88 Jesse Sanders – (redshirt) sophomore (6'3, 245); Offensive lineman: 52 Jaylen Nichols – senior (6'5, 322); 53 Vershon Lee Junior (6'4, 308); 54 Jovaughn Gwyn – (redshirt) senior (6'3, 300); 55 Jakai Moore – (redshirt) junior (6'6, 305); 57 Grayson Mains – freshman (6'5, 300); 60 Jordan Davis – (redshirt) freshman (6'5, 305); 62 Tyshon Wannamaker – (redshirt) sophomore (6'3, 318); 64 JonDarius Morgan – (redshirt) freshman (6'3, 312); 65 Jackson Hall – freshman (6'3, 300); 66 Mac Walters – freshman (6'6, 290); 67 Chase Sweigart – freshman (6'6, 305); 68 Wyatt Campbell – (redshirt) senior (6'6, 310); 70 Hank Manos – (redshirt) senior (6'4, 303); 71 Eric Douglas – Sixth Year (6'4, 297); 72 Trai Jones – (redshirt) sophomore (6'2, 308); 73 Ryan Brubaker – freshman (6'6, 295); 75 Cason Henry – freshman (6'6, 300); 77 Colin Henrich – (redshirt) freshman (6'3, 305); 79 Dylan Wonnum – Fifth Year (6'5, 305); Defensive lineman: 6 Zacch Pickens – senior (6'4, 305); 50 Felix Hixon – freshman (6'3, 300); 54 Jamaal Whyce – freshman (6'3, 305); 64 Demetrius Watson – freshman (6'3, 290); 90 T. J. Sanders – (redshirt) freshman (6'5, 300); 91 Tonka Hemingway – junior (6'3, 295); 93 Nick Barrett – sophomore (6'3, 330); 94 M.J. Webb – (redshirt) senior (6'3, 313); 95 Alex Huntley – (redshirt) sophomore (6'4, 305); 99 D'Andre Martin – senior (6'4, 305)	EDGE: 4 Terrell Dawkins – (redshirt) junior (6'4, 250); 5 Jordan Burch – junior (6'6, 275); 7 Jordan Strachan – Fifth Year (6'5, 245); 8 Gilber Edmond – (redshirt) sophomore (6'5, 250); 10 Tyreek Johnson – (redshirt) junior (6'3, 265); 16 Hot Rod Fitten – (redshirt) junior (6'2, 250); 46 Bryan Thomas Jr. – freshman (6'2, 230); Linebacker: 0 Debo Williams – (redshirt) sophomore (6'1, 237); 15 Donovan Westmorland – freshman (6'1, 228); 19 Brad Johnson – Sixth Year (6'2, 238); 22 Bam Martin-Scott – (redshirt) junior (6'2, 235); 32 Mohamed Kaba – junior (6'2, 239); 35 Akhnaton Shabazz – freshman (6'0, 225); 40 Ronnie Porter – (redshirt) freshman (6'1, 238); 41 Andrew Colasurdo – (redshirt) freshman (6'1, 240); 42 Darryle Ware – (redshirt) sophomore (6'1, 228); 44 Sherrod Greene – Sixth Year (6'1, 233); 45 Colin Bryant – (redshirt) freshman (6'3, 225); 52 Stone Blanton – freshman (6'2, 235); Defensive back: 1 R.J. Roderick – Fifth Year (6'0, 207); 3 Devonni Reed – graduate (5'11, 200); 9 Cam Smith – (redshirt) junior (6'0, 188); 11 Emory Floyd Jr. – freshman (6'1, 185); 12 Anthony Rose – freshman (6'1, 190); 14 Joey Hunter – (redshirt) sophomore (6'1, 200); 18 Keenan Nelson Jr. – freshman (6'1, 200); 20 Tyrese Ross – (redshirt) senior (6'0, 200); 21 Nick Emmanwori – freshman (6'4, 218); 23 Isaiah Norris – (redshirt) junior (5'11, 185); 24 Marcellas Dial – (redshirt) junior (6'0, 192); 25 O'Donnell Fortune – (redshirt) freshman (6'1, 180); 26 Landon Grier – (redshirt) sophomore (5'9, 185); 27 DQ Smith – freshman (6'1, 212); 28 Darius Rush – (redshirt) senior (6'2, 200); 29 David Spaulding – (redshirt) junior (6'1, 197); 31 Peyton Williams – freshman (6'0, 200); 34 Cam Hardy – (redshirt) freshman (6'1, 193); 36 B.J. Gipson – (redshirt) junior (6'4, 215); 43 Joseph Byrnes – (redshirt) freshman (6'0, 195); 47 King-Demenian Ford – (redshirt) freshman (6'2, 207); 48 Noah Abrams – (redshirt) freshman (5'10, 187); Long snappers: 34 Matthew Bailey – (redshirt) junior (6'2, 215); 36 Hunter Rogers – (redshirt) sophomore (6'1, 205); 46 Cole Rasmussen – (redshirt) sophomore (5'11, 210)
: 2022 South Carolina Gamecocks Football Roster 08/09/22

== Coaching staff ==
Name	Position	Consecutive season
Shane Beamer	Head coach	2nd
Marcus Satterfield	Offensive coordinator and quarterbacks coach	2nd
Clayton White	Defensive coordinator and inside linebackers coach	2nd
Pete Lembo	Associate head coach/special teams coordinator	2nd
Torrian Gray	Defensive backs coach	2nd
Montario Hardesty	Running backs coach	2nd
Greg Adkins	Offensive line coach	2nd
Justin Stepp	Wide receivers coach	2nd
Jody Wright	Tight ends coach	1st
Sterling Lucas	Outside linebackers coach	1st
Jimmy Lindsey	Defensive line coach	2nd
Freddie Kitchens	Analyst	1st

== Rankings ==
Ranking movements Legend: ██ Increase in ranking ██ Decrease in ranking — = Not ranked RV = Received votes
	Week															
Poll	Pre	1	2	3	4	5	6	7	8	9	10	11	12	13	14	Final
AP	RV	RV	—	—	—	—	RV	RV	25	RV	—	—	RV	20	20	23
Coaches	RV	—	—	—	—	—	RV	RV	25	RV	—	—	RV	20	19	23
CFP	Not released									—	—	—	—	19	19	Not released

== Statistics and highlights ==
The University of South Carolina and others have published many highlights from the Gamecocks' 2022 football season.

- The 8–5 overall record and 4–4 SEC record were both one-game improvements over the 2021 season
- Predicted by the media to finish 5th in the SEC East, but finished 3rd
- Only the fifteenth season of 8+ wins in school history, and first since 2017
- Ranked 23rd in the country in both the final Associated Press and USA Today Coaches’ polls
- Only the tenth season to finish ranked in the AP poll in school history, and first since 2013
- First wins over back-to-back top-10 teams in school history
- Only the seventh time in history a school has defeated top-10 opponents in consecutive weeks as an unranked team, and first since 2003
- Only the sixth season in school history to beat three ranked teams, and first since 2013
- First season in school history to beat three top-15 teams
- Beat Texas A&M for the first time in nine tries
- Won at Kentucky for the first time since 2012
- Defeated Clemson for the first time since 2013
- Won three true road games for the first time since 2013
- Had a four-game winning streak for the first time since 2013
- Defeated top-5 opponent at home for the first time since 2012
- Yards of offense and points against Tennessee were both the most by an unranked team against an AP top-5 opponent in the poll era
- Selected as the FWAA's National Team of the Week after the win against Tennessee, winning the honor for only the fifth time since 2002
- Snapped Clemson's 40-game home winning streak
- The Gator Bowl was the highest rated non-New Year’s Six bowl game of the season
- The Tennessee game and Gator Bowl were the fifth-highest and sixth-highest rated Gamecock football games of the last ten seasons
- Sold out all six Saturday home games
- Averaged 75,785 in attendance for seven home contests, which ranked 16th in the country
- Entered the AP Poll rankings for the first time since 2018, and entered the College Football Playoff rankings for the first time since 2017
- Reached highest ranking in AP Poll since 2014
- Reached highest College Football Playoff ranking in program history
- Won four of their five non-conference games, improving their record to 40–13 in their last 53 non-conference games
- Used 42 different starters, including 20 on offense and 22 on defense
- Averaged 32.2 points per game, which ranked 39th in the country and was nearly a 10-points per game increase over the 2021 campaign, when they averaged 22.6 points per game
- Scored 30+ points in nine games for the first time in school history
- Ranked 27th in the country in pass efficiency defense and 34th in passing defense
- Forced 23 turnovers, which ranked second in the SEC and 20th in the country
- Made fifteen interceptions, which ranked first in the SEC and 14th in the nation
- Had the nation’s top-ranked special teams unit, earning the No. 1 spot in ESPN’s special teams efficiency ranking
- Ranked tied for second in the country in blocked punts, third in blocked kicks, fourth in punt returns, fifth in kickoff returns, seventh in net punting, 23rd in opponent kickoff returns and 27th in opponent punt returns
- Perfect in field goal attempts at 11-for-11, only the second season in school history to do so with a minimum of ten attempts, after 1980
