= Columbia Central High School =

Columbia Central High School can refer to

- Columbia Central High School (Bloomsburg, Pennsylvania)
- Columbia Central High School (Columbia, Tennessee)
- Columbia Central High School (Brooklyn, Michigan)
