= 2024 South Alabama Jaguars softball team =

American college softball season

2024 South Alabama Jaguars softball

NCAA Gainesville Regional, 2–2
- Conference: Sun Belt Conference
- Record: 34–20–1 (16–8 SBC)
- Head coach: Becky Clark (18th season)
- Assistant coaches: Kristina McCain; Hannah Campbell
- Home stadium: Jaguar Field

2024 Sun Belt Conference softball standings
	Conf.						Overall
Team	W		L		T	PCT	W		L		T	PCT
No. 21 Louisiana ‍†‍‍^{y}	22	–	2	–	0	.917	45	–	19	–	0	.703
Texas State ‍‍‡‍^{y}	18	–	6	–	0	.750	47	–	15	–	0	.758
South Alabama ‍‍‍^{y}	16	–	8	–	0	.667	34	–	20	–	1	.627
Coastal Carolina ‍‍‍	14	–	10	–	0	.583	34	–	21	–	0	.618
Troy ‍‍‍	13	–	11	–	0	.542	34	–	22	–	0	.607
Georgia Southern ‍‍‍	12	–	12	–	0	.500	30	–	21	–	0	.588
James Madison ‍‍‍	12	–	12	–	0	.500	31	–	22	–	0	.585
Louisiana-Monroe ‍‍‍	12	–	12	–	0	.500	31	–	24	–	0	.564
Marshall ‍‍‍	10	–	14	–	0	.417	25	–	28	–	0	.472
Southern Miss ‍‍‍	10	–	14	–	0	.417	22	–	29	–	0	.431
Appalachian State ‍‍‍	4	–	20	–	0	.167	21	–	30	–	0	.412
Georgia State ‍‍‍	1	–	23	–	0	.042	11	–	42	–	0	.208
† – Conference champion ‡ – Tournament champion y – Invited to the NCAA tournament As of May 19, 2024; Rankings from NFCA/USA Today

The 2024 South Alabama Jaguars softball team represented the University of South Alabama during the 2024 NCAA Division I softball season. The Jaguars played their home games at Jaguar Field. The Jaguars were led by eighteenth-year head coach Becky Clark and were members of the Sun Belt Conference.

== Preseason ==
=== Sun Belt Conference Coaches Poll ===
The Sun Belt Conference Coaches Poll was released on January 31, 2024. South Alabama was picked to finish second in the conference with 127 votes.

Coaches poll
Predicted finish	Team	Votes (1st place)
1	Louisiana	144 (12)
2	South Alabama	127
3	Texas State	122
4	Troy	98
5	James Madison	94
6	Coastal Carolina	81
7	Marshall	79
8	Louisiana–Monroe	59
9	Southern Miss	49
10	Georgia State	35
11	Georgia Southern	25
12	Appalachian State	23

=== Preseason All-Sun Belt team ===
- Lauren Allred (1st Base, LA)
- Taylor McKinney (2nd Base, TXST)
- Alexa Langeliers (2nd Base, LA)
- Sydney Bickel (Shortstop, MARSH)
- Brooke Ellestad (Shortstop, LA)
- Sara Vanderford (3rd Base, TXST)
- Delaney Keith (3rd Base, CCU)
- Mihyia Davis (Outfielder, LA)
- Mackenzie Brasher (Outfielder, USA)
- Kayt Houston (Outfielder, APP)
- Sophie Piskos (Catcher, LA)
- Iyana De Jesus (Designated Player, CCU)
- Jessica Mullins (Pitcher, TXST)
- Olivia Lackie (Pitcher, USA)
- Sam Landry (Pitcher, LA)

=== National Softball Signing Day ===
Player	Position	Hometown	Previous Team
Kooper Barnes	Pitcher	Roca, Nebraska	Lincoln East HS
Ashleia Coble	Pitcher	Columbia, Tennessee	Zion Christian Academy
Morgan Hall	Catcher	Hockessin, Delaware	St. Mark's HS
Brea Holley	Catcher	Pensacola, Florida	West Florida HS
Presley Lively	Outfielder	Helena, Alabama	Helena HS
Sydney Scapin	Pitcher	Pensacola, Florida	West Florida HS
Katie Schuler	Infielder/Utility	Huntsville, Alabama	Huntsville HS
Ansleigh Smith	Catcher/Utility	Ashford, Alabama	Houston Academy
Gracie Ward	Outfielder	Slocomb, Alabama	Slocomb HS

== Personnel ==
2024 South Alabama Jaguars softball team
Players
Coaches

#	Pos.	Name	Bats/throws	Height	Year	Home town
0	RHP	Tori Miller	R/R	5 ft 9 in (1.75 m)	So	Harrah, Oklahoma
1	INF	Olivia Branstetter	R/R	5 ft 5 in (1.65 m)	Fr	Liberty, Missouri
2	OF	Erin McGlothlin (redshirt)	L/R	5 ft 6 in (1.68 m)	So	Homestead, Florida
4	OF	Brooklynn Bockhaus	R/R	5 ft 7 in (1.7 m)	So	Haughton, Louisiana
5	U	Sidney Lee	R/R	5 ft 7 in (1.7 m)	Jr	Dadeville, Alabama
7	C	Molly Pitts	R/R	5 ft 7 in (1.7 m)	Fr	Mobile, Alabama
8	RHP	Cadence Williams	R/R	6 ft 0 in (1.83 m)	Fr	Rising Sun, Maryland
9	U	Stephanie Gonzalez	R/R	5 ft 5 in (1.65 m)	Jr	Pembroke Pines, Florida
10	INF	Gracie Tentinger	R/R	5 ft 8 in (1.73 m)	Jr	Meridian, Idaho
11	INF	Marley Sims	L/R	5 ft 2 in (1.57 m)	Sr	Gulfport, Mississippi
12	RHP	Ryley Harrison	R/R	6 ft 0 in (1.83 m)	Fr	Fairhope, Alabama
13	INF	Gabby Stagner	R/R	5 ft 8 in (1.73 m)	Jr	Mobile, Alabama
14	OF	Bailey Welch	L/R	5 ft 6 in (1.68 m)	Sr	Hueytown, Alabama
15	INF	Caitlyn Gavin	R/R	5 ft 5 in (1.65 m)	Fr	Jay, Florida
18	OF	Mackenzie Brasher	L/R	5 ft 6 in (1.68 m)	GS	Orange Beach, Alabama
19	C	Sasha Willems	R/R	5 ft 4 in (1.63 m)	Sr	Sydney, Australia
21	U	Sophia Mendoza	R/R	5 ft 7 in (1.7 m)	So	Lehigh Acres, Florida
22	RHP	Madison Lagle	L/R	5 ft 11 in (1.8 m)	So	Glen St. Mary, Florida
24	INF	Shelby Garrett (redshirt)	R/R	5 ft 6 in (1.68 m)	So	Frostproof, Florida
27	INF	Odalys Cordova (redshirt)	R/R	5 ft 4 in (1.63 m)	Sr	Orlando, Florida
33	OF	Amity White	L/R	5 ft 3 in (1.6 m)	Fr	Brundidge, Alabama
44	INF	Marlayna Capaldi	R/R	5 ft 5 in (1.65 m)	So	Wilmington, Delaware
99	RHP	Olivia Lackie	R/R	6 ft 0 in (1.83 m)	Sr	Walker, Louisiana

Head coach

Becky Clark (Mobile)

Assistant coach(es)

Kristina McCain (Auburn)
Hannah Campbell (South Alabama)
Jayden Mount (Louisiana–Monroe)

Legend

- (C) Team captain
- (S) Suspended
- (I) Ineligible
- Injured
- Current redshirt

Roster
Last update: 27 February 2025

== Schedule and results ==
Legend
	South Alabama win
	South Alabama loss
	Postponement/Cancellation/Suspensions
**Bold**	South Alabama team member

2024 South Alabama Jaguars softball game log
Regular season (31–17–1)

February (10–4)
Date	Opponent	Rank	Site/stadium	Score	Win	Loss	Save	TV	Attendance	Overall record	SBC record
NFCA Leadoff Classic
Feb. 9	vs. North Carolina Central		Eddie C. Moore Complex • Clearwater, FL	**W** 8–0^{6}	**Harrison** (1–0)	Davis (0–1)	None		234	1–0	
Feb. 9	vs. Notre Dame		Eddie C. Moore Complex • Clearwater, FL	**W** 5–1	**Lackie** (1–0)	Becker (0–1)	None		423	2–0	
Feb. 10	vs. St. John's		Eddie C. Moore Complex • Clearwater, FL	**W** 3–2	**Lackie** (2–0)	Mearns (0–2)	None		344	3–0	
Feb. 10	vs. Missouri		Eddie C. Moore Complex • Clearwater, FL	**L** 3–6	Harrison (2–0)	**Lackie** (2–1)	None		534	3–1	
Feb. 11	vs. Central Arkansas		Eddie C. Moore Complex • Clearwater, FL	**W** 3–2	**Lackie** (3–1)	Runner (1–2)	None		345	4–1	
South Alabama Invitational
Feb. 16	Central Michigan		Jaguar Field • Mobile, AL	**W** 10–0^{5}	**Harrison** (2–0)	Compau (0–1)	None		375	5–1	
Feb. 17	Northern Illinois		Jaguar Field • Mobile, AL	**W** 8–4	**Lackie** (4–1)	Stewart (2–3)	None		465	6–1	
Feb. 17	Eastern Kentucky		Jaguar Field • Mobile, AL	**L** 7–10	Rutan (5–0)	**Harrison** (2–1)	None		465	6–2	
Feb. 18	UAB		Jaguar Field • Mobile, AL	**W** 2–0	**Lackie** (5–1)	Kirby (1–3)	None		423	7–2	
Feb. 20	at Southeastern Louisiana		North Oak Park • Hammond, LA	**W** 9–1^{6}	**Lackie** (6–1)	DuBois (4–1)	None	ESPN+	312	8–2	
Gamecock Invitational
Feb. 23	vs. UMass		Carolina Softball Stadium • Columbia, SC	**W** 8–0^{6}	**Harrison** (3–1)	Bolton (2–3)	None		92	9–2	
Feb. 24	vs. Charlotte		Carolina Softball Stadium • Columbia, SC	**L** 1–2	Gress (4–2)	**Lackie** (6–2)	None		150	9–3	
Feb. 24	at No. 17 South Carolina		Carolina Softball Stadium • Columbia, SC	**W** 5–2	**Lackie** (7–2)	Vawter (3–1)	None		1,764	10–3	
Feb. 25	vs. James Madison		Carolina Softball Stadium • Columbia, SC	**L** 2–3	List (4–1)	**Williams** (0–1)	Humphrey (1)		85	10–4	–

March (8–10–1)
Date	Opponent	Rank	Site/stadium	Score	Win	Loss	Save	TV	Attendance	Overall record	SBC record
T-Mobile Crimson Classic
Mar. 1	vs. Northern Iowa		Rhoads Stadium • Tuscaloosa, AL	**L** 2–3	Williams (5–1)	**Lackie** (7–3)	None		139	10–5	
Mar. 2	vs. Northern Iowa		Rhoads Stadium • Tuscaloosa, AL	**W** 11–3^{5}	**Lagle** (1–0)	Heyer (3–3)	None			11–5	
Mar. 2	at No. 10 Alabama		Rhoads Stadium • Tuscaloosa, AL	**W** 2–0	**Lackie** (8–3)	Torrence (6–1)	None			12–5	
Mar. 3	vs. No. 15 Arizona		Rhoads Stadium • Tuscaloosa, AL	**T** 1–1^{11}						12–5–1	
Razorback Rumble
Mar. 8	vs. Northern Iowa		Bogle Park • Fayetteville, AR	**L** 2–7	Wischnowski (6–2)	**Harrison** (3–2)	None		400	12–6–1	
Mar. 8	at No. 18 Arkansas		Bogle Park • Fayetteville, AR	**W** 2–1	**Lackie** (9–3)	Herron (6–5)	None	SECN+	1,500	13–6–1	
Mar. 9	vs. Nebraska		Bogle Park • Fayetteville, AR	**L** 1–5	Kinney (7–6)	**Lagle** (1–1)	None		400	13–7–1	
Mar. 9	at No. 18 Arkansas		Bogle Park • Fayetteville, AR	**L** 4–10	Camenzind (5–0)	**Lagle** (2–1)	None	SECN+	3,067	13–8–1	
Mar. 10	vs. Saint Francis		Bogle Park • Fayetteville, AR	**W** 2–0	**Lackie** (10–3)	Marsden (7–5)	None		500	14–8–1	
Mar. 15	Louisiana		Jaguar Field • Mobile, AL	**L** 2–3	Landry (8–5)	**Lackie** (10–4)	Riassetto (2)	ESPN+	750	14–9–1	0–1
Mar. 16	Louisiana		Jaguar Field • Mobile, AL	**L** 2–6	Riassetto (6–2)	**Lagle** (1–3)	None	ESPN+	504	14–10–1	0–2
Mar. 16	Louisiana		Jaguar Field • Mobile, AL	**L** 3–15^{8}	Landry (9–5)	**Lackie** (10–5)	None	ESPN+	504	14–11–1	0–3
Mar. 23	at Louisiana–Monroe		Geo-Surfaces Field at the ULM Softball Complex • Monroe, LA	**W** 1–0	**Lackie** (11–5)	Nichols (7–6)	None		446	15–11–1	1–3
Mar. 23	at Louisiana–Monroe		Geo-Surfaces Field at the ULM Softball Complex • Monroe, LA	**W** 10–2	**Harrison** (4–2)	Abrams (7–6)	None		614	16–11–1	2–3
Mar. 24	at Louisiana–Monroe		Geo-Surfaces Field at the ULM Softball Complex • Monroe, LA	**W** 5–4^{13}	**Lackie** (12–5)	Nichols (7–7)	None		542	17–11–1	3–3
Mar. 26	McNeese		Jaguar Field • Mobile, AL	**L** 2–3	Sanders (10–6)	**Harrison** (4–3)	Lindsay (3)	ESPN+	346	17–12–1	
Mar. 28	No. 23 Texas State		Jaguar Field • Mobile, AL	**L** 0–1	Mullins (18–3)	**Lackie** (12–6)	None		451	17–13–1	3–4
Mar. 29	No. 23 Texas State		Jaguar Field • Mobile, AL	**L** 3–13	Azua (6–3)	**Harrison** (4–4)	Mullins (3)		429	17–14–1	3–5
Mar. 30	No. 23 Texas State		Jaguar Field • Mobile, AL	**W** 3–2	**Lackie** (13–6)	Mullins (18–4)	None		411	18–14–1	4–5

April (11–2)
Date	Opponent	Rank	Site/stadium	Score	Win	Loss	Save	TV	Attendance	Overall record	SBC record
Apr. 6	at Appalachian State		Sywassink/Lloyd Family Stadium • Boone, NC	**W** 3–0	**Lackie** (14–6)	Buckner (2–4)	None		315	19–14–1	5–5
Apr. 7	at Appalachian State		Sywassink/Lloyd Family Stadium • Boone, NC	**W** 2–1	**Harrison** (5–4)	Neas (6–9)	**Lackie** (1)		201	20–14–1	6–5
Apr. 7	at Appalachian State		Sywassink/Lloyd Family Stadium • Boone, NC	**W** 5–1	**Lackie** (15–6)	Northrop (7–5)	None		211	21–14–1	7–5
Apr. 10	at Mississippi State		Nusz Park • Starkville, MS	Game postponed							
Apr. 12	Georgia Southern		Jaguar Field • Mobile, AL	**W** 3–0	**Lackie** (16–6)	Pettit (9–7)	None		558	22–14–1	8–5
Apr. 13	Georgia Southern		Jaguar Field • Mobile, AL	**L** 3–6	Barnard (5–3)	**Harrison** (5–5)	Holland (1)		395	22–15–1	8–6
Apr. 14	Georgia Southern		Jaguar Field • Mobile, AL	**W** 2–1	**Lackie** (17–6)	Holland (5–7)	None		431	23–15–1	9–6
Apr. 17	at No. 17 Mississippi State		Nusz Park • Starkville, MS	**W** 2–0	**Miller** (1–0)	Marron (9–7)	**Lackie** (2)		329	24–15–1	
Apr. 19	at Georgia State		Robert E. Heck Softball Complex • Atlanta, GA	**W** 7–2	**Lackie** (18–6)	Boulware (6–13)	None		312	25–15–1	10–6
Apr. 20	at Georgia State		Robert E. Heck Softball Complex • Atlanta, GA	**W** 6–2	**Miller** (2–0)	Hodnett (0–6)	None		146	26–15–1	11–6
Apr. 20	at Georgia State		Robert E. Heck Softball Complex • Atlanta, GA	**W** 4–0	**Lackie** (19–6)	Kastelic (1–4)	None		143	27–15–1	12–6
Apr. 26	at Troy		Troy Softball Complex • Troy, AL	**L** 2–3	Baker (13–8)	**Lackie** (19–7)	None		1,051	27–16–1	12–7
Apr. 27	at Troy		Troy Softball Complex • Troy, AL	**W** 6–3	**Miller** (3–0)	Pittman (5–4)	None		1,844	28–16–1	13–7
Apr. 28	North Carolina Central		Jaguar Field • Mobile, AL	**W** 7–2	**Lackie** (20–8)	Baker (14–10)	None		572	29–16–1	14–7

May (2–1)
Date	Opponent	Rank	Site/stadium	Score	Win	Loss	Save	TV	Attendance	Overall record	SBC record
May 2	Southern Miss		Jaguar Field • Mobile, AL	**W** 5–4	**Lackie** (21–7)	Stepp (4–7)	**Miller** (1)		379	30–16–1	15–7
May 3	Southern Miss		Jaguar Field • Mobile, AL	**L** 4–5	Lee (9–8)	**Miller** (3–1)	White (2)		750	30–17–1	15–8
May 4	Southern Miss		Jaguar Field • Mobile, AL	**W** 6–0	**Lackie** (22–7)	Stepp (4–8)	None		477	31–17–1	16–8

Post-Season (3–3)

SBC tournament (1–1)
Date	Opponent	(Seed)/Rank	Site/stadium	Score	Win	Loss	Save	TV	Attendance	Overall record	Tournament record
May 9	vs. (6) Louisiana–Monroe	(3)	Bobcat Softball Stadium • San Marcos, TX	**W** 2–1^{12}	**Lackie** (23–7)	Hulett (1–2)	None	ESPN+		32–17–1	1–0
May 10	at (2) Texas State	(3)	Bobcat Softball Stadium • San Marcos, TX	**L** 3–4^{6}	Mullins (29–8)	**Lackie** (23–8)	None	ESPN+	679	32–18–1	1–1

NCAA tournament (2–2)
Date	Opponent	(Seed)/Rank	Site/stadium	Score	Win	Loss	Save	TV	Attendance	Overall record	Tournament record
Gainesville Regional
May 17	vs. (3) Florida Atlantic	(2)	Katie Seashole Pressly Softball Stadium • Gainesville, FL	**W** 1–0	**Lackie** (23–8)	Sacco (12–4)	None		1,462	33–18–1	1–0
May 18	at (1)/No. 5 Florida	(2)	Katie Seashole Pressly Softball Stadium • Gainesville, FL	**L** 1–9^{5}	Rothrock (28–6)	**Lackie** (24–9)	None			33–19–1	1–1
May 18	vs. (4) Florida Gulf Coast	(2)	Katie Seashole Pressly Softball Stadium • Gainesville, FL	**W** 5–1	**Lackie** (25–9)	Sparkman (12–6)	None		1,382	34–19–1	2–1
May 19	at (1)/No. 5 Florida	(2)	Katie Seashole Pressly Softball Stadium • Gainesville, FL	**L** 1–9^{5}	Brown (16–5)	**Miller** (3–2)	None		2,063	34–20–1	2–2

Schedule source:

*Rankings are based on the team's current ranking in the NFCA/USA Softball poll.

== Gainesville Regional ==
Lafayette Regional Teams
(1) Florida Gators	(2) South Alabama Jaguars	(3) Florida Atlantic Owls	(4) Florida Gulf Coast Eagles

First Round
4	Florida	6
Florida Gulf Coast	0
South Alabama	1
Florida Atlantic	0
Lower round 1
Florida Gulf Coast	3
Florida Atlantic	2

Semi-Finals
4	Florida	9^{(5)}
South Alabama	1
Lower final
South Alabama	5
Florida Gulf Coast	1

Finals
4	Florida	9^{(5)}	–
South Alabama	1	–
