= Robert Reed (wide receiver) =

American football player (born 1975)

No. 85
- Position: Wide receiver

Personal information
- Born: January 14, 1975 (age 51); Hinds County, Mississippi, U.S.
- Listed height: 6 ft 1 in (1.85 m)
- Listed weight: 203 lb (92 kg)

Career information
- High school: Northwest Rankin
- College: Lambuth
- NFL draft: 1999: undrafted

Career history
- San Diego Chargers (1999); Oakland Raiders (2001)*
- * Offseason or practice squad member only
- Stats at Pro Football Reference

Robert E. Reed (born January 14, 1975) is an American former professional football wide receiver who played for the San Diego Chargers of the National Football League (NFL). He played college football at University of Arkansas, University of Mississippi and Lambuth University.
