= Jared Verse =

American football player (born 2000)

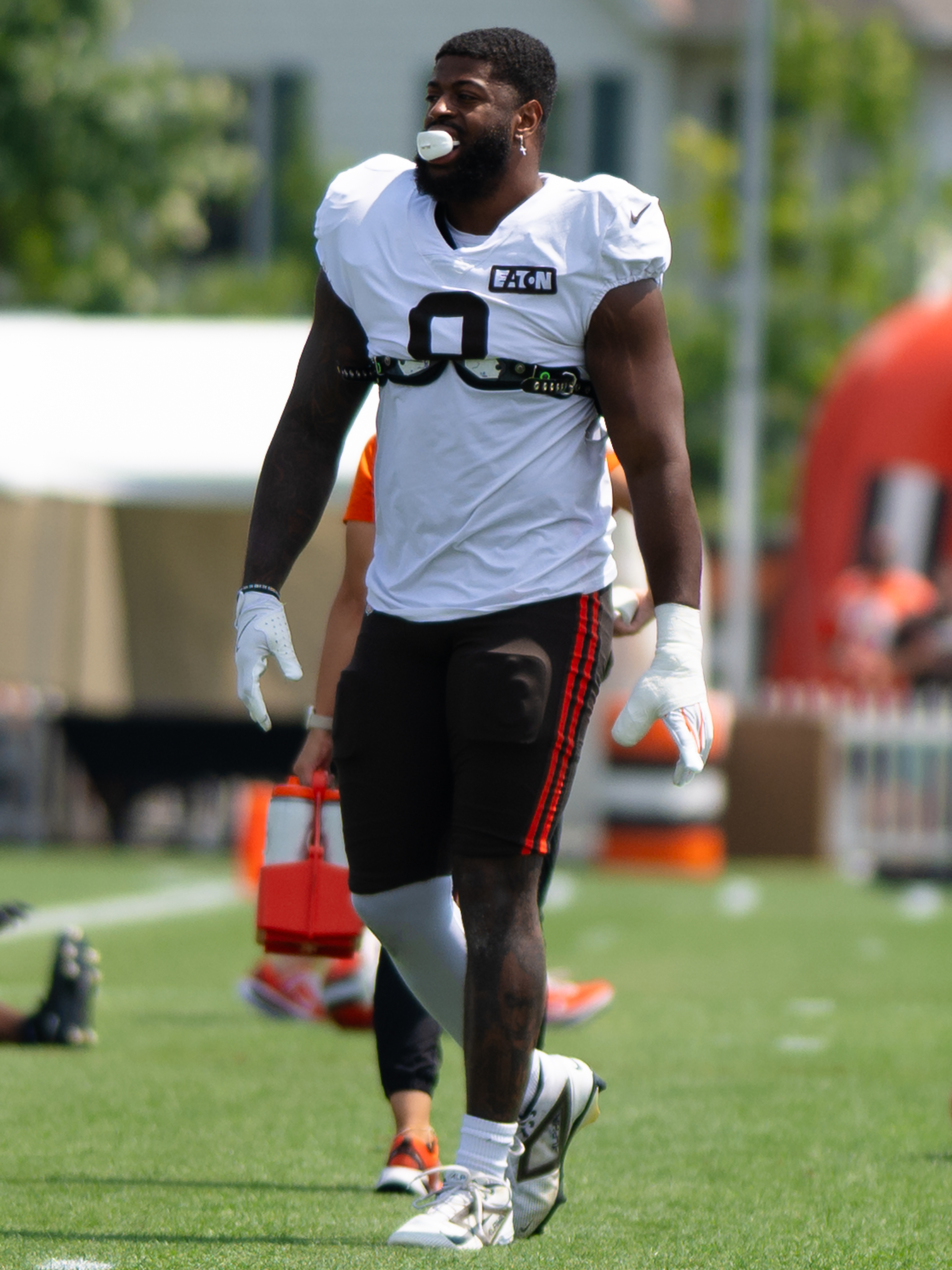
- Verse with the Cleveland Browns in 2026

No. 8 – Cleveland Browns
- Position: Defensive end
- Roster status: Active

Personal information
- Born: November 4, 2000 (age 26); Dayton, Ohio, U.S.
- Listed height: 6 ft 4 in (1.93 m)
- Listed weight: 265 lb (120 kg)

Career information
- High school: Central Columbia (Bloomsburg, Pennsylvania)
- College: Albany (2019–2021); Florida State (2022–2023)
- NFL draft: 2024: 1st round, 19th overall pick

Career history
- Los Angeles Rams (2024–2025); Cleveland Browns (2026–present)

Awards and highlights
- NFL Defensive Rookie of the Year (2024); 2× Pro Bowl (2024, 2025); 2× first-team All-American (2022, 2023); CAA Defensive Rookie of the Year (2020); 2× first-team All-ACC (2022, 2023); First-team All-CAA (2021); Second-team All-CAA (2020)

Career NFL statistics as of Week 10, 2026
- Tackles: 144
- Sacks: 12.0
- Forced fumbles: 5
- Fumble recoveries: 2
- Pass deflections: 3
- Touchdowns: 1
- Stats at Pro Football Reference

Jared Isaiah Verse (born November 4, 2000) is an American professional football defensive end for the Cleveland Browns of the National Football League (NFL). He played college football for the Albany Great Danes and Florida State Seminoles. Verse was the 2020 CAA Defensive Rookie of the Year with Albany and a two-time All-American with Florida State. Verse was selected by the Los Angeles Rams in the first round of the 2024 NFL draft and was named the Defensive Rookie of the Year.

== Early life ==
Verse was born on November 4, 2000, in Dayton, Ohio. He grew up in Greenville, North Carolina and later moved to Berwick, Pennsylvania. Verse played football at Hope Middle School and for one year at D.H. Conley High School before moving on to Central Columbia High School. Playing defensive end and tight end for the Bluejays football team, Verse earned three straight All-Pennsylvania Heartland Athletic Conference (PHAC) honors. He also played basketball and was a member of Central Columbia's state champion 4x400-meter relay team.

== College career ==
Verse redshirted his freshman season at Albany. He made 22 tackles with 10 tackles for loss and four sacks over four games during his redshirt freshman season, which was shortened and played in early 2021 due to the COVID-19 pandemic. He was named second-team All-Colonial Athletic Association (CAA) and won the conference's Defensive Rookie of the Year award.

In 2021, Verse was named first-team All-CAA after finishing the season with 53 tackles, 11.5 tackles for loss, 9.5 sacks, and one forced fumble.

In 2022, Verse announced he was transferring to Florida State University to play for the Seminoles. He finished his first season with the Seminoles with 48 tackles, 17 tackles for loss, and nine sacks. Voted Florida State's Defensive MVP, Verse was a first team All-ACC selection and was named to numerous All-American teams.

Verse was just as dominant in 2023 recording 41 total tackles with 12.5 tackles for loss and nine sacks. Again named the Seminoles' Defensive MVP, Verse earned first team All-ACC honors for the second straight season and repeated as an All-American.

Following the end of his junior season, Verse declared for the 2024 NFL draft following the 2023 season.

== Professional career ==
Pre-draft measurables
| Height | Weight | Arm length | Hand span | Wingspan | 40-yard dash | 10-yard split | 20-yard split | 20-yard shuttle | Three-cone drill | Vertical jump | Broad jump | Bench press |
|---|---|---|---|---|---|---|---|---|---|---|---|---|
| 6 ft 3 7/8 in (1.93 m) | 254 lb (115 kg) | 33 1/2 in (0.85 m) | 9 7/8 in (0.25 m) | 6 ft 7 1/2 in (2.02 m) | 4.58 s | 1.60 s | 2.67 s | 4.44 s | 7.31 s | 35.0 in (0.89 m) | 10 ft 7 in (3.23 m) | 31 reps |
All values from NFL Combine

=== Los Angeles Rams ===
Verse was selected by the Los Angeles Rams in the first round, 19th overall, of the 2024 NFL draft.

==== 2024 season ====
Verse recorded his first career sack in a 26–20 overtime loss in his NFL debut on Sunday Night Football at Ford Field against the Detroit Lions in Week 1. Verse was later on named the Defensive Rookie of the Month for September after recording 19 total tackles, five for loss, and one sack. In Week 13 against the New Orleans Saints, Verse had a strip sack on quarterback Derek Carr on 4th and 3 during the final minutes of the game to seal the win for Los Angeles. In the Wild Card Round against the Minnesota Vikings, Verse scored his first career NFL touchdown on a 57-yard fumble recovery to help lead the Rams to a 27–9 win. In the Divisional Round against the Philadelphia Eagles, Verse contributed to a strong Rams pass rushing performance with four tackles, three tackles for loss, and two sacks in the 28-22 loss. He was named the 2024 NFL Defensive Rookie of the Year and the PFWA All-Rookie Team, as well as being voted to the Pro Bowl, the only Rams player so honored for the season. He was ranked 53rd by his fellow players on the NFL Top 100 Players of 2025.

==== 2025 season ====
In Week 17 of the 2025 season against the Atlanta Falcons, Verse blocked a Zane Gonzalez field goal attempt and returned it 76 yards for a touchdown. He finished the 2025 regular season with 7.5 sacks, 58 total tackles, and three forced fumbles while being voted to his second Pro Bowl. In the postseason, Verse continued his role as a standout edge defender, recording a sack in the NFC Championship Game on quarterback Sam Darnold against the rival Seattle Seahawks.

=== Cleveland Browns ===
On June 1, 2026, the Rams traded Verse, a 2027 first-round pick, a 2028 second-round pick, and a 2029 third-round pick to the Cleveland Browns for Myles Garrett.

== Career statistics ==
Legend
| | Led the league |
| **Bold** | Career high |

=== NFL ===
==== Regular season ====
| Year | Team | Games | | Tackles | | | | | Interceptions | | | | | Fumbles | | | |
| Year | Team | GP | GS | Solo | Ast | Cmb | Sck | TFL | PD | Int | Yds | Avg | TD | FF | FR | Yds | TD |
|---|---|---|---|---|---|---|---|---|---|---|---|---|---|---|---|---|---|
| 2024 | LAR | 17 | 16 | **36** | **30** | **66** | 4.5 | **11** | **2** | 0 | 0 | 0.0 | 0 | 2 | **2** | 0 | 0 |
| 2025 | LAR | 17 | 17 | 35 | 23 | 58 | **7.5** | **11** | 1 | 0 | 0 | 0.0 | 0 | **3** | 0 | 0 | 0 |
| 2026 | CLE | 10 | 10 | 10 | 10 | 20 | 0.0 | 4 | 0 | 0 | 0 | 0.0 | 0 | 0 | 0 | 0 | 0 |
| Career | | 44 | 43 | 81 | 63 | 144 | 12.0 | 26 | 3 | 0 | 0 | 0.0 | 0 | 5 | 2 | 0 | 0 |

==== Postseason ====
| Year | Team | Games | | Tackles | | | | | Interceptions | | | | | Fumbles | | | |
| Year | Team | GP | GS | Solo | Ast | Cmb | Sck | TFL | PD | Int | Yds | Avg | TD | FF | FR | Yds | TD |
|---|---|---|---|---|---|---|---|---|---|---|---|---|---|---|---|---|---|
| 2024 | LAR | 2 | 2 | **5** | 1 | 6 | **2.0** | **3** | 0 | 0 | 0 | 0.0 | 0 | 0 | **1** | **57** | **1** |
| 2025 | LAR | 3 | 3 | 4 | **3** | **7** | 1.0 | **3** | 0 | 0 | 0 | 0.0 | 0 | 0 | 0 | 0 | 0 |
| Career | | 5 | 5 | 9 | 4 | 13 | 3.0 | 6 | 0 | 0 | 0 | 0.0 | 0 | 0 | 1 | 57 | 1 |

=== College ===
| Year | Team | GP | Tackles | | | | | Fumble Recovery | | | |
| Year | Team | GP | Solo | Ast | Cmb | TfL | Sck | No. | Yds | TD | FF |
|---|---|---|---|---|---|---|---|---|---|---|---|
| 2019 | Albany | Redshirt (redshirt) | | | | | | | | | |
| 2020 | Albany | 4 | 15 | 7 | 22 | 10 | 4 | 0 | 0 | 0 | **1** |
| 2021 | Albany | 11 | **32** | 21 | **53** | 11.5 | **9.5** | 0 | 0 | 0 | **1** |
| 2022 | Florida State | 12 | 22 | **26** | 48 | **17** | 9 | **1** | **10** | 0 | 0 |
| 2023 | Florida State | 12 | 23 | 18 | 41 | 12.5 | 9 | **1** | 0 | 0 | **1** |
| Career | | 39 | 92 | 72 | 164 | 38.5 | 31.5 | 2 | 10 | 0 | 3 |

== Personal life ==
Verse's father, Eric, is a former member of the United States Marine Corps and works as an engineer. His mother, Janienne, works in marketing and helped him manage his college football recruiting. He has five siblings.
