= Northwest Rankin High School =

- Former campus of Northwest Rankin High School (now Northwest Rankin Middle School)

Location
- 5805 Highway 25; Flowood, Mississippi; United States
- 32.35868°N 90.00005°W

Information
- Type: Public
- School district: Rankin County School District
- Superintendent: Sue Townsend
- NCES School ID: 280383001076
- Principal: Lewis Bradford
- Teaching staff: 124.77 (on an FTE basis)
- Grades: 9–12
- Enrollment: 1,855 (2024-2025)
- Student to teacher ratio: 14.87
- Campus type: Suburban
- Colors: Black and Gold Chrome
- Mascot: Cougar
- Nickname: Northwest, NWR
- Website: nrh.rcsd.ms

Northwest Rankin High School is a suburban public high school located in Flowood, Mississippi, United States. The school serves grades 9-12 and is part of the Rankin County School District. The school's attendance was approximately 1,700 students at the 2018 campus census.

Plans for the construction of a new high school were approved by the Rankin County School District board. It was completed by the start of the 2021–2022 school year. Funding for this project was approved by the District's bond issue.

== Academics ==
Northwest Rankin offers Advanced Placement (AP) courses in English, Math, Science, and Social Studies. In addition, there are five four-year academic specializations (referred to as academies) offered in addition to several dual enrollment courses with Hinds Community College.

=== Academies ===
The academic specializations include the business academy, health science academy, engineering academy, convergent media academy, educational leadership academy, and JROTC. All of these academies are four-year programs that the student can receive an endorsement upon graduation.

=== Classes ===
Several AP courses are offered, including AP Art, AP US History, AP US Government, AP English Literature, AP English Language and Composition, AP Spanish, AP French, AP Physics 1, AP Chemistry, AP Calculus AB, and AP Statistics. Dual credit courses including DC College Algebra, DC Biology I, DC Biology II, DC Music Appreciation, DC Composition I, DC Composition II, DC American Literature, DC British Literature, DC World Literature, and DC Public Speaking are offered.

== Student body ==
=== Demographics ===
As of the 2023-2024 school year, the school had an attendance of 1431 students.

Enrollment by Grade
9	10	11	12	Ungraded
480	450	367	387	22

Enrollment by Race/Ethnicity
American Indian/Alaska Native	Asian	Black	Hispanic	Native Hawaiian/Pacific Islander	White	Two or More Races
3	58	457	54	0	1,091	42

=== Matriculation statistics ===
In the typical graduating class, 70% of all students attend a 2- or 4-year college or university, with 20% joining the workforce and 10% joining active US military service. From the 2017 graduating class, the estimated total scholarship award to national colleges and universities amounted to $110 million.

== Athletics ==
Northwest Rankin offers a wide range of athletic extracurricular activities, in which most events have both women's and men's teams. The campus features a football, soccer, track, and softball field, in addition to several auxiliary outdoor athletic facilities.

=== Sports ===
- Baseball
- Basketball
- Bass fishing
- Bowling
- Cheerleading
- Cross country
- Dance team
- Football
- Golf
- Powerlifting
- Soccer
- Softball
- Swimming
- Tennis
- Track and field

== Performance ==
As of 2024, Northwest Rankin High School was ranked #7 out of 37 Jackson, MS metro area high schools, and #2 of 8 Rankin County School District high schools by U.S. News & World. It had the highest dropout rate (8.9%) and lowest graduation rate (89.2%) of Rankin County School District high schools.

== School Feeder Pattern ==
Northwest Rankin High School is part of a larger primary/secondary education feeder pattern.

- Elementary schools
  - Flowood Elementary School
  - Highland Bluff Elementary School
  - Northshore Elementary School
  - Northwest Rankin Elementary School
  - Oakdale Elementary School
- Middle school
  - Northwest Rankin Middle School
- High school
  - Northwest Rankin High School

== Notable alumni ==
- Ryan Bukvich – MLB relief pitcher
- Jarrian Jones – NFL cornerback
- Tyler Moore – MLB left fielder
- Brent Powell – member of the Mississippi House of Representatives
- Robert Reed – NFL wide receiver
- Dalton Rogers – MLB pitcher in the Boston Red Sox organization
- Reed Trimble – MLB outfielder in the Baltimore Orioles organization
