= Jarrian Jones =

American football player (born 2001)

No. 4 – Jacksonville Jaguars
- Position: Cornerback
- Roster status: Active

Personal information
- Born: May 8, 2001 (age 25); Magee, Mississippi, U.S.
- Listed height: 5 ft 11 in (1.80 m)
- Listed weight: 190 lb (86 kg)

Career information
- High school: Northwest Rankin (Flowood, Mississippi)
- College: Mississippi State (2019); Florida State (2020–2023)
- NFL draft: 2024: 3rd round, 96th overall pick

Career history
- Jacksonville Jaguars (2024–present)

Career NFL statistics as of 2025
- Total tackles: 89
- Sacks: 2
- Fumble recoveries: 1
- Pass deflections: 16
- Interceptions: 4
- Stats at Pro Football Reference

Jarrian Jones (born May 8, 2001) is an American professional football cornerback for the Jacksonville Jaguars of the National Football League (NFL). He played college football for the Mississippi State Bulldogs and Florida State Seminoles. Jones was selected by the Jaguars in the third round of the 2024 NFL draft.

== Early life ==
Jones attended high school at Northwest Rankin. Coming out of high school, Jones was ranked as a four-star recruit where he decided to commit to play college football for the Mississippi State Bulldogs.

== College career ==
=== Mississippi State ===
In Jones first season with the Bulldogs in 2019, he played in 11 games notching 12 tackles, two pass deflections, and a fumble recovery. After the conclusion of the 2019 season, Jones decided to enter the NCAA transfer portal.

=== Florida State ===
On May 23, 2020, Jones initially decided to transfer to play for the Ole Miss Rebels. However just over a week later, Jones would flip his commitment to play for the Florida State Seminoles. In Jones first three seasons with Florida State in 2020, 2021, and 2022, he notched 59 tackles, seven pass deflections, and two interceptions. In week two of the 2023 season, Jones recorded his first career pick-six after he intercepted quarterback Billy Wiles and returned it 30 yards for a touchdown against Southern Miss. In week eleven, Jones picked off Miami quarterback Tyler Van Dyke to win 27–20. In the 2023 season, Jones tallied 25 tackles with five going for a loss, three interceptions, and a touchdown. After the conclusion of the 2023 season, Jones declared for the 2024 NFL draft. Jones also accepted an invite to play in the 2024 East-West Shrine Bowl.

Jones finished his Florida State career playing in 44 games, totaling 84 tackles with five and a half being for a loss, 15 pass deflections, and five interceptions.

== Professional career ==
Pre-draft measurables
| Height | Weight | Arm length | Hand span | Wingspan | 40-yard dash | 10-yard split | 20-yard split | 20-yard shuttle | Vertical jump | Broad jump |
|---|---|---|---|---|---|---|---|---|---|---|
| 5 ft 11 7/8 in (1.83 m) | 190 lb (86 kg) | 30 in (0.76 m) | 8 5/8 in (0.22 m) | 6 ft 1 1/4 in (1.86 m) | 4.38 s | 1.53 s | 2.53 s | 4.30 s | 39.5 in (1.00 m) | 10 ft 9 in (3.28 m) |
All values from NFL Combine/Pro Day

Jones was selected by the Jacksonville Jaguars with the 96th overall selection in the 2024 NFL draft. In Week 9, Jones was involved in a notable play when Philadelphia Eagles running back Saquon Barkley performed a backward hurdle leap over him. The play later became the inspiration for the cover of Madden NFL 26. In Week 13, Jones was ejected from a game against the Houston Texans for throwing a punch in a fight that erupted after Texans linebacker Azeez Al-Shaair made an illegal hit on Jaguars quarterback Trevor Lawrence, giving Lawrence a concussion.

== NFL career statistics ==
Legend
| **Bold** | Career high |

=== Regular season ===
| Year | Team | Games | | Tackles | | | | | Interceptions | | | | | | Fumbles | | | | |
| Year | Team | GP | GS | Cmb | Solo | Ast | Sck | TFL | Int | Yds | Avg | Lng | TD | PD | FF | Fmb | FR | Yds | TD |
|---|---|---|---|---|---|---|---|---|---|---|---|---|---|---|---|---|---|---|---|
| 2024 | JAX | 17 | 4 | 40 | 30 | 10 | **2.0** | 1 | 1 | 0 | 0.0 | 0 | 0 | **8** | 0 | 0 | 0 | 0 | 0 |
| 2025 | JAX | 17 | 3 | **49** | **35** | **14** | 0.0 | **6** | **3** | **13** | **4.3** | **13** | 0 | **8** | 0 | 0 | **1** | 0 | 0 |
| Career | | 34 | 7 | 89 | 65 | 24 | 2.0 | 7 | 4 | 13 | 3.3 | 13 | 0 | 16 | 0 | 0 | 1 | 0 | 0 |

=== Postseason ===
| Year | Team | Games | | Tackles | | | | | Interceptions | | | | | | Fumbles | | | | |
| Year | Team | GP | GS | Cmb | Solo | Ast | Sck | TFL | Int | Yds | Avg | Lng | TD | PD | FF | Fmb | FR | Yds | TD |
|---|---|---|---|---|---|---|---|---|---|---|---|---|---|---|---|---|---|---|---|
| 2025 | JAX | 1 | 0 | 3 | 3 | 0 | 0.0 | 0 | 0 | 0 | 0.0 | 0 | 0 | 0 | 0 | 0 | 0 | 0 | 0 |
| Career | | 1 | 0 | 3 | 3 | 0 | 0.0 | 0 | 0 | 0 | 0.0 | 0 | 0 | 0 | 0 | 0 | 0 | 0 | 0 |
