= Jaheim Bell =

American football player (born 2001)

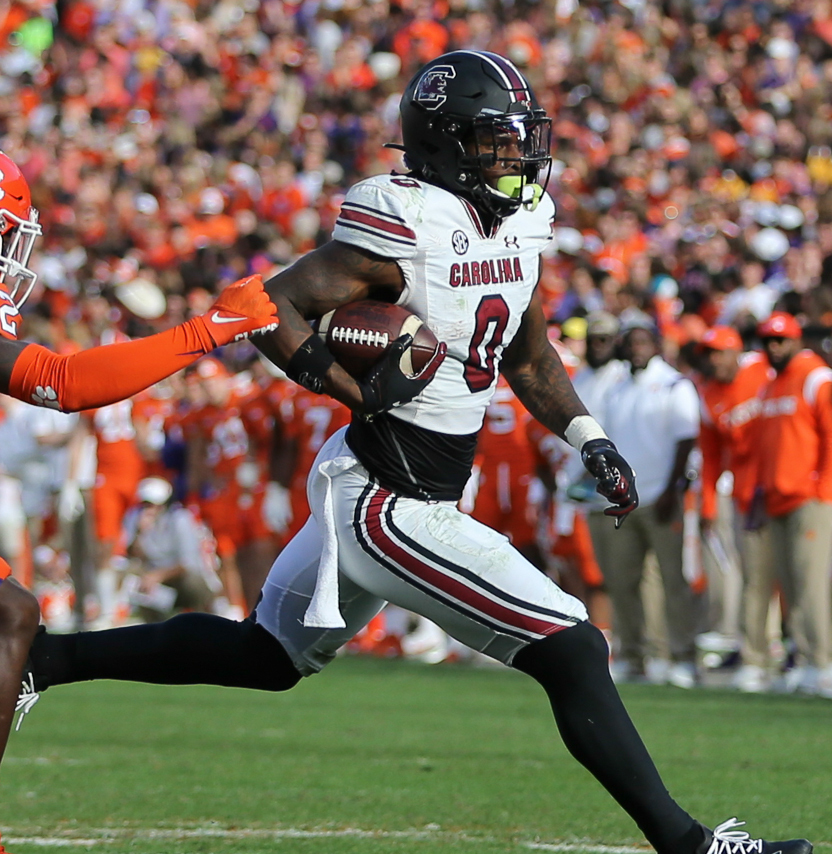
- Bell with South Carolina in 2022

Columbus Aviators
- Position: Tight end
- Roster status: Unsigned draft pick

Personal information
- Born: June 14, 2001 (age 25); Lake City, Florida, U.S.
- Listed height: 6 ft 2 in (1.88 m)
- Listed weight: 241 lb (109 kg)

Career information
- High school: Valdosta (Valdosta, Georgia)
- College: South Carolina (2020–2022); Florida State (2023)
- NFL draft: 2024: 7th round, 231st overall pick

Career history
- New England Patriots (2024); Philadelphia Eagles (2025)*; Pittsburgh Steelers (2025)*; Philadelphia Eagles (2026)*; Pittsburgh Steelers (2026)*; Columbus Aviators (2027-present)
- * Offseason or practice squad member only

Awards and highlights
- Second-team All-ACC (2023)

Career NFL statistics as of 2025
- Receptions: 2
- Receiving yards: 20
- Stats at Pro Football Reference

Jaheim Cameron Bell (born June 14, 2001) is an American professional football tight end. He played college football for the South Carolina Gamecocks and Florida State Seminoles.

== Early life ==
Bell attended Valdosta High School in Valdosta, Georgia. He played both tight end and wide receiver in high school. He tore his ACL midway through his senior season which caused him to miss the rest of the year. Bell originally committed to the University of Florida to play college football but changed to the University of South Carolina.

== College career ==
Bell played in five games as a freshman at South Carolina in 2020, recording one reception for 29 yards. As a sophomore in 2021, he played in 13 games with five starts and had 30 receptions for 497 yards and five touchdowns.

His 2022 season was notable for his lack of carries and touches despite off-season hype coming off the previous year's Dukes Mayo Bowl. His uncle and mother both tweeted and caused a stir regarding the perceived lack of production and usage by the offensive coaching staff. Bell entered the transfer portal on December 5, 2022, signing with the Florida State Seminoles the following Monday.

Year	Team	GP	Receiving			
Year	Team	GP	Rec	Yds	Avg	TD
2020	South Carolina	5	1	29	29.0	0
2021	South Carolina	13	30	497	16.6	5
2022	South Carolina	12	25	231	9.2	2
2023	Florida State	13	39	503	12.9	2
Career		43	95	1,260	13.3	9

== Professional career ==
Pre-draft measurables
Height	Weight	Arm length	Hand span	Wingspan	40-yard dash	10-yard split	20-yard split	Vertical jump	Broad jump
6 ft 2 in (1.88 m)	241 lb (109 kg)	33 in (0.84 m)	10 in (0.25 m)	6 ft 6 3/4 in (2.00 m)	4.61 s	1.58 s	2.67 s	35.0 in (0.89 m)	10 ft 4 in (3.15 m)
All values from NFL Combine

=== New England Patriots ===
Bell was selected with the 231st overall pick in the 2024 NFL draft by the New England Patriots. The Patriots had acquired that pick from the Chicago Bears in a trade for N'Keal Harry. Bell signed his rookie contract with the Patriots on May 10, 2024. On November 3, during a game against the Tennessee Titans, Bell made his first career NFL catch for a yard. On January 5, 2025, in the final quarter of the final game, Bell made his second NFL catch.

On August 22, 2025, Bell was released by the Patriots.

=== Philadelphia Eagles ===
On October 15, 2025, Bell signed with the Philadelphia Eagles' practice squad. He was released on October 21.

=== Pittsburgh Steelers ===
On December 31, 2025, Bell was signed to the Pittsburgh Steelers' practice squad.

=== Philadelphia Eagles (second stint) ===
On January 21, 2026, Bell signed a reserve/futures contract with the Philadelphia Eagles. On April 28, Bell was waived by the Eagles.

=== Pittsburgh Steelers (second stint) ===
On May 4, 2026, Bell signed with the Pittsburgh Steelers on a one-year contract. On August 28, Bell was waived by the Steelers.
