= West Florida High School of Advanced Technology =

Coordinates: 30.487797°N 87.290152°W

Location
- 150 E Burgess Rd; Pensacola, Florida 32526; United States

Information
- Type: Magnet
- Motto: The West Florida Way!
- Established: 2001
- Dean: Rachel Simmons
- Principal: Esi Shannon
- Teaching staff: 58.00 (on an FTE basis)
- Enrollment: 1,345 (2023-2024)
- Student to teacher ratio: 23.19
- Campus: Suburban
- Colors: Black and red
- Mascot: Jaguar
- District: Escambia County School District
- Website: westfloridahs.escambiaschools.org

West Florida High School of Advanced Technology is a magnet high school located in Pensacola, Florida. It is part of the Escambia County School District.

West Florida High School of Advanced Technology opened in August 2001 with 324 9th graders. Today, the enrollment is 1,280 students, 9th through 12th grade.

== Technical fields ==
- Academy of Information Technology
- Aerospace Engineering
- Agriscience Technology
- Biomedical Sciences
- Civil Engineering and Architecture
- Cox Telecommunications
- Criminal Justice
- Critical Care & Emergency Medicine
- Energy Academy
- Multimedia
- Pre-Professional Nursing
- Sports Medicine

WFHS runs on a modified block schedule. On even calendar days, even numbered classes meet, and on odd calendar days, odd numbered classes meet. The exception to this rule is 7th period, which meets every day.

Seniors may elect to participate in the A.C.E. program, which allows students to get on the job training while getting paid by participating in internships.

== Capstone ==
Each student completes a Capstone project—a display of comprehension and mastery of a given field that focuses on a field-related topic.

The project is separated into three parts:

- technical paper
- product or project-related community service
- presentation with visual aides

The Capstone project is completed during the 11th grade year only.

== Athletics ==
West Florida High provides many sports such as football, volleyball, baseball, cheerleading, softball, cross-country, track and field, basketball, soccer, swimming, weightlifting, lacrosse, tennis and golf. With the first new sport addition in the last few years, lacrosse has been made an official sport for both boys and girls in the 2014–2015 school year.

The West Florida softball team brought the school its first team state championship in the 2013–2014 year.

In the 2011 - 2012 year, the Jaguars Freshman football team went 9–1, claiming the district championship.

The 2013 - 2014 team fell just short of another district championship. After being ranked No. 1 in the state for a few weeks to start the season, the team lost to the then No. 2 ranked Catholic High. They still made the playoffs, but they were thwarted by Catholic again with an overtime loss in the second round of the playoffs. They did beat Tallahassee Godby in the first round, which was a major accomplishment considering the fact that Godby had knocked them out of the playoffs the previous two years. In the 2016 - 2017 school year, the Freshman and Junior Varsity football teams went undefeated, along with a 6–2 record for Varsity.

Girls' soccer won consecutive district titles in 2012 and 2013.

Boys' soccer won its first district championship in 2018 after defeating Choctawhatchee 2–0 in the District 1-3A Championship game. West Florida also knocked off #2 in the state Gulf Breeze High School in the district semifinal with a score of 2–0, and Pensacola High 5–0 in the opening round of the tournament.

== Arts and other activities ==
WFHS added a marching band in the 2010–2011 school year. Known as the Sound of the Jags, they are led by Dustin Hicklen.

During 2007–2008, in its 9th year of existence, WFHS served as the President school of the Florida Association of Student Councils. Since then, the Student Government Association has earned a Gold Medallion every year. The organization's main project in 2016–2017 involves a local nursing home, Bayside Manor. All SGA members volunteer there for four hours per nine weeks.

== Online presence ==
West Florida High School's Student Government Association (SGA) hosts an Instagram and Twitter page to "update and notify students of current/future school news and events." Similarly, yearbook club spreads information relating to yearbook orders and pickup via their Instagram page. Other arts courses, sports teams, and clubs use social media, including Key Club, HOSA Club, volleyball, soccer, lacrosse, basketball, and more.

== Notable alumni ==
- Darius Washington, professional football offensive lineman
