= Darius Washington (Canadian football) =

American football player (born 2000)

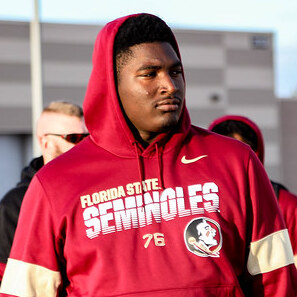
- Washington with Florida State in 2019

No. 58 – Toronto Argonauts
- Position: Offensive lineman
- Roster status: Practice roster
- CFL status: American

Personal information
- Born: September 6, 2000 (age 26)
- Listed height: 6 ft 4 in (1.93 m)
- Listed weight: 310 lb (141 kg)

Career information
- High school: West Florida (Pensacola, Florida)
- College: Florida State (2019–2024)
- NFL draft: 2025: undrafted

Career history
- Saskatchewan Roughriders (2025); Toronto Argonauts (2026–present)

Awards and highlights
- Grey Cup champion (2025); First-team All-ACC (2023)
- Stats at CFL.ca

Darius Washington (born September 6, 2000) is an American professional football offensive lineman for the Toronto Argonauts of the Canadian Football League (CFL). He played college football at Florida State.

== Early life ==
Darius Washington was born on September 6, 2000. He played high school football at the West Florida High School of Advanced Technology in Pensacola, Florida. As a junior in 2017, he helped West Florida go to the 5A state championship game and achieve a 12–2 overall record while earning second-team all-state honors. Washington was named first-team all-area by the Pensacola News Journal his senior year in 2018. In the class of 2019, he was rated a four-star recruit by ESPN.com and a three-star recruit by both 247Sports.com and Rivals.com. ESPN also ranked him the No. 39 offensive tackle in the country and the No. 68 overall prospect in Florida.

== College career ==
Washington played college football for the Florida State Seminoles of Florida State University. He played in four games, starting three at left tackle, as a true freshman in 2019. He ended up redshirting the 2019 season. Washington appeared in seven games, starting five at left tackle, during the COVID-19 shortened 2020 season. He started all 12 games in 2021 (seven at right tackle and five at left tackle). In 2022, he played in 11 games, starting seven (four games at right tackle, two at left tackle, and one at center). Washington received the Don Powell Award in 2022 as one of Florida State's "unsung heroes". In 2023, he appeared in 13 games, starting ten (eight at left tackle and two at center). He earned Phil Steele honorable mention All-American and first-team All-ACC honors for his performance during the 2023 season. Washington played in ten games, all starts at left tackle, as a redshirt senior in 2024. He received Florida State's Bill McGrotha Award for humanitarian work.

== Professional career ==
=== Saskatchewan Roughriders ===
After going undrafted in the 2025 NFL draft, Washington was invited to rookie minicamp on a tryout basis with the Denver Broncos. He was signed to the practice roster of the Saskatchewan Roughriders of the Canadian Football League (CFL) on June 9, 2025. On July 18, 2025, Washington was promoted to the active roster to start at left tackle after left tackles Payton Collins and Daniel Johnson both suffered injuries. In his CFL debut and first start, Washington made a "hammering" block on the first play from scrimmage as the Roughriders gave up no sacks and beat the BC Lions 33–27. Washington was moved back to the practice roster on August 1, 2025.

On May 25, 2026, Washington was released by the Roughriders.

=== Toronto Argonauts ===
Washington signed with the Toronto Argonauts on June 21, 2026.
