= Central Columbia High School =

Coordinates: 41.019752°N 76.366739°W

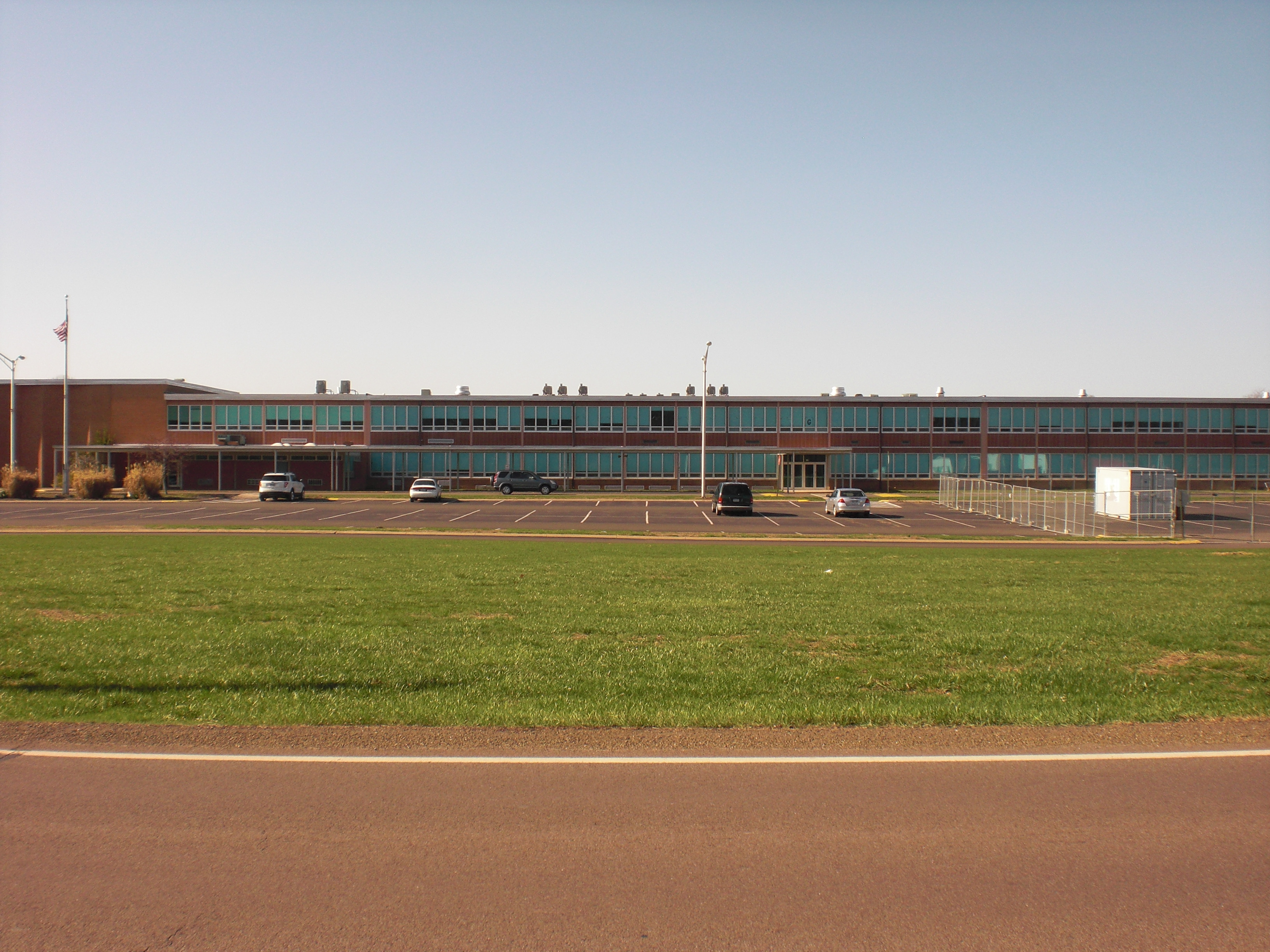
- Part of the Central Columbia High School building

Location
- 4777 Old Berwick Road; Bloomsburg, Columbia County, Pennsylvania 17815; United States

Information
- School type: Public
- School district: Central Columbia School District
- Oversight: Pennsylvania Department of Education, Pennsylvania General Assembly, US Department of Education
- Principal: Adam Comstock
- Staff: 47.00 (FTE)
- Faculty: 41.5 teachers (2013), 42 teachers (2010)
- Grades: 9-12
- Enrollment: 606 (2023–2024)
- Student to teacher ratio: 12.89
- Language: English
- Colors: Blue, White, and Silver
- Mascot: Blue Jay
- Team name: Fighting Blue Jays
- Yearbook: Centaur
- Feeder schools: Central Columbia Middle School
- Website: https://www.ccsd.cc/o/high

Columbia Central High School is a small, rural public high school in central Pennsylvania that was founded in 1960. It is commonly known in the area as "Central". The district consists of a high school, middle school, and elementary school operated by the Central Columbia School District. Central Columbia High School is located at 4777 Old Berwick Road, Bloomsburg.

Central Columbia High School students may choose to attend Columbia-Montour Area Vocational-Technical School for training in the trades and service industry. The Central Susquehanna Intermediate Unit CSIU16 provides the school with a wide variety of services like specialized education for disabled students and hearing, speech and visual disability services and professional development for staff and faculty.

== Extracurriculars ==
The Central Columbia School District offers a wide variety of clubs, activities and an extensive sports program. The sports programs are through the Pennsylvania Heartland Athletic Conference and the Pennsylvania Interscholastic Athletic Association. The Pennsylvania Heartland Athletic Conference is a voluntary association of 25 PIAA High Schools within the central Pennsylvania region.

Clubs - National Honor Society, French Club, Spanish Club, FBLA, FFA, TSA and many more. Advisors receive additional compensation for heading these clubs, as outlined in the teachers' union contract.

== Athletics ==
The Central Columbia athletics programs have had success in recent years. The girls' basketball and softball teams are also perennial contenders. The Athletic Director is Kevin Morgan. Coaches receive additional compensation as outlined in the teachers' union contract. Where a sports team competes beyond the regular season additional payments are made to the coaching staff.

Boys

- Baseball - AA
- Basketball- AA
- Bowling - AAAA
- Cross Country - AA
- Football - AA
- Golf - AA
- Soccer - AA
- Swimming and Diving - AA
- Tennis - AA
- Track and Field - AA
- Wrestling - AA

Girls

- Basketball - AA
- Bowling - AAAA
- Cross Country - AA
- Field Hockey - AA
- Golf - AA
- Soccer (Fall) - AA
- Softball - AA
- Swimming and Diving - AA
- Girls' Tennis - AA
- Track and Field - AA

According to PIAA directory July 2015

== Notable alumni ==
- Jared Verse, NFL defensive end for the Cleveland Browns
