= Saturday Down South =

College sports website focused on Southeastern Conference

- Website type: Sports
- Available in: English
- Owner: XLMedia
- Website: www.saturdaydownsouth.com
- Launched: June 2010

Saturday Down South is an online publication that covers college football and other sports, primarily related to the schools in the Southeastern Conference. It is owned and operated by XLMedia.

Saturday Down South produces daily digital content covering the schools of the SEC. The website has a section for each of the 16 Southeastern Conference schools. Saturday Down South also produces regular content for its social media channels, podcast feeds, and YouTube channel. In 2016, Saturday Down South was named one of the 50 must-follow college football Twitter accounts.

The website directly covers the following teams within the Southeastern Conference: The Alabama Crimson Tide, Arkansas Razorbacks, Auburn Tigers, Florida Gators, Georgia Bulldogs, Kentucky Wildcats, LSU Tigers, Mississippi State Bulldogs, Missouri Tigers, Oklahoma Sooners, Ole Miss Rebels, South Carolina Gamecocks, Tennessee Volunteers, Texas Longhorns, Texas A&M Aggies, Vanderbilt Commodores. While the focus of the coverage mostly centers around the college football season, Saturday Down South also covers major college sporting events such as March Madness and the College World Series.

== History ==
The website was founded in 2010 by Kevin Duffey and gained popularity among college football fans through its regular commentary and news on SEC football. An early example is when Saturday Down South broke the news of Will Muschamp being hired by the University of Florida.

In 2015, the Saturday Down South team launched another website named Saturday Tradition aimed at the coverage of sports teams within the Big Ten Conference.

In September 2016, Saturday Down South partnered with Texas Pete and Bud Light on sponsorship campaigns targeting college football fans in the Southeast region of the United States.

In 2017, Saturday Down South launched the Saturday Down South Podcast, which can feature notable college football guests such as Paul Finebaum.

In September 2021, Saturday Down South was acquired by XLMedia.
