= Vershon Lee =

American football player (born 2001)

Louisville Kings
- Position: Guard
- Roster status: Unsigned draft pick

Personal information
- Born: December 7, 2001 (age 24); Woodbridge, Virginia, U.S.
- Listed height: 6 ft 4 in (1.93 m)
- Listed weight: 318 lb (144 kg)

Career information
- High school: Freedom (VA)
- College: South Carolina (2020–2024)
- NFL draft: 2025: undrafted

Career history
- Minnesota Vikings (2025); Arizona Cardinals (2026)*; Cleveland Browns (2026)*; Louisville Kings (2027-present)
- * Offseason or practice squad member only

Career NFL statistics as of 2025
- Games played: 1
- Stats at Pro Football Reference

Vershon R. Lee (born December 7, 2001) is an American professional football guard. He played college football for the South Carolina Gamecocks and was signed by the Minnesota Vikings as an undrafted free agent in 2025.

== Early life and college career ==
Lee was born on December 7, 2001, in Woodbridge, Virginia. He attended Freedom High School in Woodbridge where he played football as a two-way lineman and also was a top basketball player. He was named all-district in both sports and was an all-state football player in 2018. A three-star recruit, he committed to play college football for the South Carolina Gamecocks.

Lee appeared in South Carolina's first three games as a true freshman in 2020, then redshirted. He appeared in all 13 games, nine as a starter at left guard, in 2021. He then started seven of 12 games at left guard in 2022. Prior to the 2023 season, he transitioned to playing center, a position he had never played before. He started the first five games of the season at center before moving to right tackle and starting the remaining five games there. Lee started all 13 games at center in his final season, 2024. He concluded his collegiate career with 51 games played, 40 as a starter. He was invited to the 2025 Tropical Bowl.

== Professional career ==
Pre-draft measurables
Height	Weight	Arm length	Hand span	40-yard dash	10-yard split	20-yard split	20-yard shuttle	Three-cone drill	Vertical jump	Broad jump	Bench press
6 ft 3 1/8 in (1.91 m)	304 lb (138 kg)	32 7/8 in (0.84 m)	10 in (0.25 m)	5.17 s	1.73 s	3.01 s	4.96 s	8.00 s	31.0 in (0.79 m)	8 ft 10 in (2.69 m)	28 reps
All values from Pro Day

=== Minnesota Vikings ===
After going unselected in the 2025 NFL draft, Lee attended minicamps with the Kansas City Chiefs and Chicago Bears, and tried out for the Cleveland Browns, but was not signed. After a tryout, he signed with the Minnesota Vikings on June 13, 2025, as an undrafted free agent. He was waived on August 26 as part of final roster cuts, then signed to the practice squad the next day. Lee was promoted to the active roster on October 4, following an injury to Ryan Kelly, and made his NFL debut the following day against the Cleveland Browns, appearing on four special teams snaps. He was waived two days later and re-signed back to the practice squad.

Lee signed a reserve/future contract with Minnesota on January 5, 2026. On August 30, he was waived by the Vikings as a part of the final roster cuts.

=== Arizona Cardinals ===
On September 1, 2026, Lee was signed to the Arizona Cardinals' practice squad. On October 6, he was released.

=== Cleveland Browns ===
On October 13, 2026, Lee signed with the Cleveland Browns practice squad. On November 3, he was released.
