= Jeremiah Byers =

American football player (born 2001)

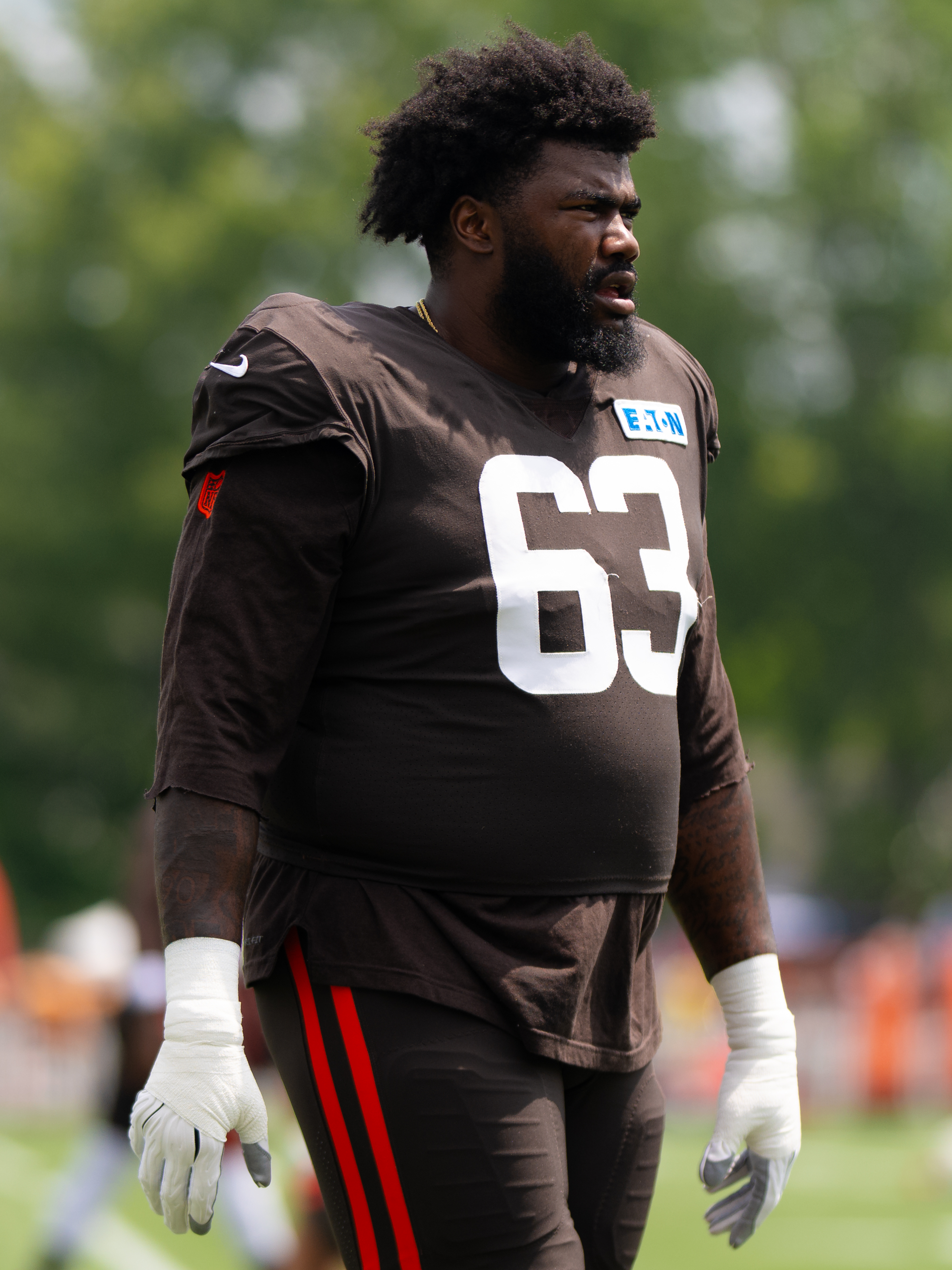
- Byers with the Cleveland Browns in 2026

Rhode Island Breakers
- Position: Offensive tackle
- Roster status: Unsigned draft pick

Personal information
- Born: March 23, 2001 (age 25); Austin, Texas, U.S.
- Listed height: 6 ft 4 in (1.93 m)
- Listed weight: 320 lb (145 kg)

Career information
- High school: Anderson (Austin, Texas)
- College: UTEP (2019–2022); Florida State (2023–2024)
- NFL draft: 2025: undrafted

Career history
- Arizona Cardinals (2025)*; Cleveland Browns (2025); Rhode Island Breakers (2027-present)
- * Offseason or practice squad member only

Awards and highlights
- First team All-CUSA (2022)
- Stats at Pro Football Reference

Jeremiah Shaquille Byers (born March 23, 2001) is an American professional football offensive tackle. He previously played college football for the Florida State Seminoles and for the UTEP Miners.

== Early life ==
Coming out of high school, he was rated as a three-star recruit and the 2,384th overall player in the class of 2019, where he committed to play college football for the UTEP Miners.

== College career ==
=== UTEP ===
During his four-year career at UTEP from 2019 through 2022, he played in 34 games while making 30 starts, earning first-team all conference honors in 2022. After the conclusion of the 2022 season, Byers entered the NCAA transfer portal.

=== Florida State ===
Byers transferred to play for the Florida State Seminoles. In his two-year career as a Seminole from 2023 through 2024, he played in 23 games with 22 starts, where he was named the team's Offensive Newcomer of the Year in 2023 and won the Bobby Bowden Leadership Award in 2024.

== Professional career ==
Pre-draft measurables
Height	Weight	Arm length	Hand span	Wingspan	40-yard dash	10-yard split	20-yard split	20-yard shuttle	Three-cone drill	Vertical jump	Broad jump	Bench press
6 ft 4 1/4 in (1.94 m)	314 lb (142 kg)	34 in (0.86 m)	9 3/4 in (0.25 m)	6 ft 9 1/2 in (2.07 m)	5.23 s	1.79 s	2.98 s	4.83 s	7.93 s	29.5 in (0.75 m)	8 ft 7 in (2.62 m)	23 reps
All values from Pro Day

=== Arizona Cardinals ===
After not being selected in the 2025 NFL draft, Byers signed with the Arizona Cardinals as an undrafted free agent. On August 26, 2025, he was released but signed back to the team's practice squad in the following days.

=== Cleveland Browns ===
On December 10, 2025, the Cleveland Browns signed Byers to their active roster off of the Cardinals' practice squad.

On August 28, 2026, Byers was waived by the Browns.

=== Rhode Island Breakers ===
On November 19, 2026, Byers was selected by the Rhode Island Breakers in the 2027 UFL Draft.
