= Fentrell Cypress =

American football player (born 2001)

Profile
- Position: Cornerback

Personal information
- Born: June 5, 2001 (age 25); Rock Hill, South Carolina, U.S.
- Listed height: 6 ft 0 in (1.83 m)
- Listed weight: 187 lb (85 kg)

Career information
- High school: Northwestern (Rock Hill)
- College: Virginia (2020–2022); Florida State (2023–2024)
- NFL draft: 2025: undrafted

Career history
- Washington Commanders (2025)*
- * Offseason or practice squad member only

Awards and highlights
- First-team All-ACC (2022)
- Stats at Pro Football Reference

Fentrell Cypress II (born June 5, 2001) is an American professional football cornerback. He played college football for the Virginia Cavaliers and Florida State Seminoles. Cypress signed with the Commanders as an undrafted free agent in 2025.

== College career ==
Cypress was born on June 5, 2001, in Rock Hill, South Carolina. He played for the Virginia Cavaliers football team from 2020 to 2022. During the 2022 season, he played 661 snaps and tallied nine pass breakups and 35 tackles.

After the 2022 season, Cyress entered the NCAA transfer portal. He is rated by 247Sports as the No. 2 player currently in the portal. He transferred to Florida State in January 2023.

== Professional career ==
Pre-draft measurables
Height	Weight	Arm length	Hand span	40-yard dash	10-yard split	20-yard shuttle	Three-cone drill	Vertical jump	Broad jump
6 ft 0 1/8 in (1.83 m)	182 lb (83 kg)	31 3/4 in (0.81 m)	8 5/8 in (0.22 m)	4.43 s	1.54 s	4.34 s	6.84 s	38.0 in (0.97 m)	10 ft 3 in (3.12 m)
All values from Pro Day

Cypress signed with the Washington Commanders as an undrafted free agent on May 8, 2025. He was waived with an injury designation on July 27, 2025, and reverted to injured reserve a day later. Cypress was released on August 4, 2025.
