= Kyle Morlock =

American football player

No. 84
- Position: Tight end
- Class: Redshirt Senior

Personal information
- Listed height: 6 ft 5 in (1.96 m)
- Listed weight: 232 lb (105 kg)

Career information
- High school: Union County (Blairsville, Georgia)
- College: Shorter (2020–2022); Florida State (2023–2024)

Awards and highlights
- First-team All-GSC (2022); Second-team All-GSC (2021)
- Stats at ESPN

Kyle Morlock is an American former college football tight end. He played for the Florida State Seminoles and the Shorter Hawks.

== Early life ==
Morlock and grew up in Blairsville, Georgia and attended Union County High School. As a junior, he caught 47 passes for 757 yards and eight touchdowns. His senior year Kyle led the state in receiving yards (545) with 8 touchdowns through 5 games until he sustained an ankle injury that kept him out for multiple games.

== College career ==
Morlock played in three games during his true freshman season. He was named second-team All-Gulf South Conference (GSC) after finishing the season with 21 receptions for 362 yards and five touchdowns. In 2022, Morlock caught 30 passes for 446 yards and six touchdowns and was named first-team All-GSC. Following the end of the season he entered the NCAA transfer portal.

Morlock ultimately transferred to Florida State. He started and played at Florida State over 70% of the snaps his Junior year. He would help lead the Seminoles to an undefeated regular season, and an ACC Championship. He led the Tight Ends in catches and yards that year with 255 yards off 19 receptions. His senior year the Seminoles struggled especially in all phases and led to the coaches playing younger players for development purposes. This, along with his increasing tendency for dropped passes, unfortunately resulted in a decrease in reps. He still was brought in on third downs and critical blocking situations to sustain drives. He helped the freshman tight ends grow and learn the system.

In his collegiate career Kyle tallied 1,293 Yards receiving on 87 catches averaging 14.8 yards a catch with 11 TDs.

Was voted NCAA Division 2 All American 2 years in a row, and was considered for the John Mackey Award.

He enrolled in January 2023 to participate in the Seminoles' spring practices.

== Professional career ==
Pre-draft measurables
Height	Weight	Arm length	Hand span	40-yard dash	20-yard shuttle	Three-cone drill	Vertical jump	Broad jump	Bench press
6 ft 5 1/2 in (1.97 m)	232 lb (105 kg)	32 3/8 in (0.82 m)	9 in (0.23 m)	4.85 s	4.60 s	7.34 s	28.5 in (0.72 m)	9 ft 1 in (2.77 m)	21 reps
All values from Pro Day
