= Keith Gaither =

American football coach & former player (born 1974)

Current position
- Title: Special teams coordinator
- Team: Virginia
- Conference: ACC

Biographical details
- Born: September 4, 1974 (age 52); Thomasville, North Carolina, U.S.

Playing career
- 1993–1996: Elon
- Position: Defensive back

Coaching career (HC unless noted)
- 1997: Greensboro (DB)
- 1998–1999: Tusculum (DB)
- 2000–2004: Thomasville HS (NC) (assistant)
- 2005–2008: Winston-Salem State (DB)
- 2009–2010: Elon (WR)
- 2011–2014: Ball State (WR)
- 2015–2016: Army (WR)
- 2017–2018: East Carolina (PCG/WR)
- 2019: Western Michigan (WR)
- 2020–2021: Army (WR)
- 2022–present: Virginia (STC/RB)

Keith Gaither (born September 4, 1974) is an American football coach and former player. He is currently the special teams coordinator and running backs coach at the University of Virginia. His previous college coaching stops include Greensboro College, Tusculum University, Winston-Salem State University, Elon University, Ball State University, the United States Military Academy, East Carolina University, and Western Michigan University.

== Playing career ==
Gaither was a four-year starter at defensive back for Elon. He twice earned all-region honors.

== Coaching career ==
=== Early coaching ===
Immediately following his playing career, Gaither joined the staff at Greensboro College coaching the defensive backs in 1997. In 1998, Gaither moved on to Tusculum to coach the defensive backs for two seasons.

From 2000 to 2004, Gaither returned to his high school alma mater, Thomasville High School in Thomasville, North Carolina as an assistant coach.

=== Winston-Salem State ===
Gaither returned to the college coaching ranks when he was hired as the defensive backs coach and recruiting coordinator at Winston-Salem State from 2005-2008.

=== Elon ===
From 2009 to 2010, Gaither served as the wide receivers coach for head coach Pete Lembo at his college alma mater, Elon University. While with the Phoenix, he helped Terrell Hudgins break 19 NCAA, Southern Conference, and Elon records, along with a runner-up finish in the Walter Payton Award voting in 2009. He also tutored All-American and future Baltimore Ravens receiver Aaron Mellette.

=== Ball State ===
When Lembo was hired as the new head coach at Ball State prior to the 2011 season, he brought Gaither with him as the wide receivers coach. Throughout Gaither’s tenure at BSU, he mentored five All-Mid-American Conference selections, including future NFL receiver Willie Snead. Snead’s breakout 2013 season led to Ball State single season records in receiving yards (1,516), catches (106) and touchdowns (15).

=== Army (First stint) ===
From 2015 to 2016, Gaither was the wide receivers coach for Jeff Monken and the Army Black Knights. In his second season, his receiving corps finished fourth nationally in yards per reception (17.9).

=== East Carolina ===
In 2017, Gaither was hired at East Carolina by head coach Scottie Montgomery as the pass game coordinator and wide receivers coach. In Gaither’s two seasons with the program, he trained a first team all-conference selection each year.

=== Western Michigan ===
Following Montgomery and his staff's dismissal at East Carolina, Gaither joined Tim Lester’s staff at Western Michigan as the wide receivers coach.

=== Army (second stint) ===
On January 11, 2020, Gaither returned to Army as the wide receivers coach for the Black Knights. Over two seasons, his receivers helped Army win 18 games, including a win over the Missouri Tigers of the Southeastern Conference (SEC) in the 2021 Armed Forces Bowl. The Black Knights receivers averaged 20.55 yards per reception in 2020 and had 11 touchdown receptions in 2021.

=== Virginia ===
In January 2022, Gaither was hired as the special teams coordinator and running backs coach at Virginia as part of new head coach Tony Elliott's inaugural staff.

== Personal life ==
Gaither, who has a bachelor’s degree in sociology from Elon University. Keith and his wife Holly, have four children; Jonesha, Akeem, Madison and Hazel.
