= 2021 Army Black Knights football team =

United States Military Academy in the 2021 NCAA Division I FBS football season

2021 Army Black Knights football

Armed Forces Bowl champion

Armed Forces Bowl, W 24–22 vs. Missouri
- Conference: Independent
- Record: 9–4
- Head coach: Jeff Monken (8th season)
- Offensive coordinator: Brent Davis (8th season)
- Offensive scheme: Triple option
- Defensive coordinator: Nate Woody (2nd season)
- Co-defensive coordinator: Shiel Wood (1st season)
- Base defense: 3–4
- Captains: Marquel Broughton; Nolan Cockrill; Cedrick Cunningham Jr.; Arik Smith
- Home stadium: Michie Stadium

2021 NCAA Division I FBS independents football records
	Conf.			Overall
Team	W		L	W		L
No. 8 Notre Dame		–		11	–	2
No. 19 BYU		–		10	–	3
Army		–		9	–	4
Liberty		–		8	–	5
New Mexico State		–		2	–	10
UMass		–		1	–	11
UConn		–		1	–	11
Rankings from AP Poll

The 2021 Army Black Knights football team represented the United States Military Academy in the 2021 NCAA Division I FBS football season. The Black Knights were led by eighth-year head coach Jeff Monken and played their home games at Michie Stadium. They competed as an independent. The Black Knights finished the season with a record of 9–4, sharing the Commander-in-Chief's Trophy with Navy and Air Force after all three service academies finished with 1–1 records against each other. They were invited to the Armed Forces Bowl where they defeated Missouri, 24–22.

== Preseason ==
=== Award watch lists ===
Listed in the order that they were released.

Award	Player	Position	Year
Lott IMPACT Trophy	Arik Smith	LB	SR
Bronko Nagurski Trophy	Nolan Cockrill	DL	SR
Outland Trophy	Nolan Cockrill	DL	SR
Ray Guy Award	Zach Harding	P	SR
Paul Hornung Award	Tyrell Robinson	RB	SO
Wuerffel Trophy	Jabari Laws	QB	SR

== Schedule ==
Date	Time	Opponent	Site	TV	Result	Attendance
September 4	12:00 p.m.	at Georgia State	Center Parc Stadium; Atlanta, GA	ESPNU	W 43–10	18,280
September 11	11:30 a.m.	Western Kentucky	Michie Stadium; West Point, NY	CBSSN	W 38–35	25,989
September 18	12:00 p.m.	UConn	Michie Stadium; West Point, NY	CBSSN	W 52–21	25,030
September 25	12:00 p.m.	Miami (OH)	Michie Stadium; West Point, NY	CBSSN	W 23–10	24,045
October 2	5:00 p.m.	at Ball State	Scheumann Stadium; Muncie, IN	ESPN+	L 16–28	13,713
October 16	8:00 p.m.	at Wisconsin	Camp Randall Stadium; Madison, WI	BTN	L 14–20	76,314
October 23	12:00 p.m.	No. 16 Wake Forest	Michie Stadium; West Point, NY	CBSSN	L 56–70	38,019
November 6	11:30 a.m.	vs. Air Force	Globe Life Field; Arlington, TX (Commander-in-Chief's Trophy, Lockheed Martin Commanders' Classic)	CBS	W 21–14 ^{OT}	32,537
November 13	12:00 p.m.	Bucknell	Michie Stadium; West Point, NY	CBSSN	W 63–10	26,887
November 20	12:00 p.m.	UMass	Michie Stadium; West Point, NY	CBSSN	W 33–17	23,610
November 27	12:00 p.m.	at Liberty	Williams Stadium; Lynchburg, VA	ESPN+	W 31–16	19,269
December 11	3:00 p.m.	vs. Navy	MetLife Stadium; East Rutherford, NJ (Army–Navy Game, Commander-in-Chief's Trophy, College GameDay)	CBS	L 13–17	82,282
December 22	8:00 p.m.	vs. Missouri	Amon G. Carter Stadium; Fort Worth, TX (Armed Forces Bowl)	ESPN	W 24–22	34,888
Rankings from AP Poll and CFP Rankings (after November 3) released prior to game; All times are in Eastern time

== Game summaries ==
=== At Georgia State ===
Army Black Knights at Georgia State Panthers

Quarter	1	2	3	4	Total
Black Knights	14	13	6	10	43
Panthers	0	7	3	0	10

at Center Parc Stadium, Atlanta, GA

- Date: September 4, 2021
- Game time: 12:00 p.m. EDT
- Game weather: Temperature: 79 °F (26 °C) • Wind: SE 5 mph • Weather: Sunny
- Game attendance: 18,280
- Referee: Kyle Olson
- TV announcers (ESPNU): Clay Matvick (play-by-play), Rocky Boiman (analyst) & Tiffany Blackmon (sideline)
- ESPN – Army dominates Georgia State in season opener, 43–10 /// Box Score, Army at Georgia State /// Army Pregame Notes /// Georgia State Pregame Notes /// Postgame Notes

Game information

First quarter

- (09:17) ARMY TD – Tyson Riley 4-yard rush, Cole Talley kick
  Drive: 8 plays, 40 yards, 4:30; Army 7–0
- (01:59) ARMY TD – A.J. Howard 4-yard rush, Cole Talley kick
  Drive: 10 plays, 56 yards, 6:09; Army 14–0

Second quarter

- (08:12) ARMY TD – Jakobi Buchanan 2-yard rush, Cole Talley kick
  Drive: 13 plays, 53 yards, 7:31; Army 21–0
- (04:03) GSU TD – Destin Coates 16-yard rush, Noel Ruiz kick
  Drive: 10 plays, 75 yards, 4:09; Army 21–7
- (00:00) ARMY TD – Christian Anderson 2-yard rush, Cole Talley kick blocked
  Drive: 4 plays, 9 yards, 1:16; Army 27–7

Third quarter

- (09:33) ARMY TD – Tyrell Robinson 50-yard pass from Christian Anderson, Cole Talley rush failed
  Drive: 1 play, 40 yards, 0:08; Army 33–7
- (05:09) GSU FG – Noel Ruiz 33-yard field goal
  Drive: 13 plays, 60 yards, 4:24; Army 33–10

Fourth quarter

- (12:07) ARMY FG – Cole Talley 22-yard field goal
  Drive: 13 plays, 60 yards, 8:02; Army 36–10
- (05:29) ARMY TD – Braheam Murphy 32-yard pass from Jemel Jones, Cole Talley kick
  Drive: 8 plays, 64 yards, 5:25; Army 43–10

Passing

- ARMY – Christian Anderson: 1/2, 40 yards, 1 TD
- GSU – Cornelious Brown: 12/20, 129 yards, 1 INT

Rushing

- ARMY – Christian Anderson: 15 carries, 55 yards, 1 TD
- GSU – Destin Coates: 13 carries, 48 yards, 1 TD

Receiving

- ARMY – Tyrell Robinson: 1 reception, 40 yards, 1 TD
- GSU – Jamari Thrash: 7 receptions, 87 yards

Defense

- ARMY – Julian McDuffie: 7 total tackles (3 solo, 4 assisted)
- GSU – Jordan Veneziale: 8 total tackles (3 solo, 5 assisted), 1 tackle for loss

Statistics	ARMY	GSU
First downs	20	14
3rd down efficiency	10–16	4–10
4th down efficiency	3–3	0–1
Plays–yards	71–356	48–177
Rushes–yards	67–258	28–48
Passing yards	98	129
Passing: Comp–Att–Int	3–4–0	12–20–1
Penalties–yards	2–20	5–55
Turnovers	0	2
Time of possession	42:07	17:53

=== Western Kentucky ===
Western Kentucky Hilltoppers at Army West Point Black Knights

Quarter	1	2	3	4	Total
Hilltoppers	0	14	0	21	35
Black Knights	0	21	7	10	38

at Michie Stadium, West Point, NY

- Date: September 11, 2021
- Game time: 11:30 a.m. EDT
- Game weather: Temperature: 68 °F (20 °C) • Wind: WSW 6 mph • Weather: Sunny
- Game attendance: 25,989
- Referee: Matt Overton
- TV announcers (CBSSN): Jason Horowitz (play-by-play), Ross Tucker (analyst) & Tina Cervasio (sideline)
- ESPN – Anderson, Army hold off Western Kentucky 38–35 /// Box Score, Western Kentucky at Army /// Army Pregame Notes /// Western Kentucky Pregame Notes /// Postgame Notes

Game information

First quarter

No scoring

Second quarter

- (14:51) ARMY TD – Tyrell Robinson 24-yard rush, Cole Talley kick
  Drive: 10 plays, 62 yards, 4:50; Army 7–0
- (11:30) ARMY TD – Braheam Murphy 40-yard pass from Christian Anderson, Cole Talley kick
  Drive: 4 plays, 53 yards, 1:55; Army 14–0
- (10:40) WKU TD – Jerreth Sterns 72-yard pass from Bailey Zappe, Brayden Narveson kick
  Drive: 3 plays, 75 yards, 0:50; Army 14–7
- (02:07) ARMY TD – Jakobi Buchanan 1-yard rush, Cole Talley kick
  Drive: 16 plays, 75 yards, 8:33; Army 21–7
- (00:30) WKU TD- Bailey Zappe 10-yard rush, Brayden Narveson kick
  Drive: 6 plays, 75 yards, 1:37; Army 21–14

Third quarter

- (08:57) ARMY TD – Anthony Adkins 3-yard rush, Cole Talley kick
  Drive: 10 plays, 75 yards, 6:03; Army 28–14

Fourth quarter

- (10:31) ARMY TD – Jakobi Buchanan 13-yard rush, Cole Talley kick
  Drive: 14 plays, 71 yards, 9:15; Army 35–14
- (08:05) WKU TD – Mitchell Tinsley 21-yard pass from Bailey Zappe, Brayden Narveson kick
  Drive: 8 plays, 75 yards, 2:26; Army 35–21
- (04:58) WKU TD – Jerreth Sterns 14-yard pass from Bailey Zappe, Brayden Narveson kick
  Drive: 6 plays, 63 yards, 1:23; Army 35–28
- (01:52) ARMY FG – Cole Talley 31-yard field goal
  Drive: 7 plays, 30 yards, 3:05; Army 38–28
- (00:22) WKU TD – Adam Cofield 2-yard rush, Brayden Narveson kick
  Drive: 9 plays, 75 yards, 1:30; Army 38–35

Passing

- WKU – Bailey Zappe: 28/40, 435 yards, 3 TD, 1 INT
- ARMY – Christian Anderson: 5/6, 77 yards, 1 TD

Rushing

- WKU – Noah Whittington: 8 carries, 33 yards
- ARMY – Christian Anderson: 22 carries, 119 yards

Receiving

- WKU – Jerreth Sterns: 9 receptions, 171 yards, 2 TD
- ARMY – Braheam Murphy: 1 reception, 40 yards, 1 TD

Defense

- WKU – DeAngelo Malone: 12 total tackles (4 solo, 8 assisted)
- ARMY – Spencer Jones: 6 total tackles (3 solo, 3 assisted), 1 tackle for loss, 1 sack

Statistics	WKU	ARMY
First downs	22	23
3rd down efficiency	7–10	9–13
4th down efficiency	0–2	2–3
Plays–yards	59–477	73–416
Rushes–yards	19–42	67–339
Passing yards	435	77
Passing: Comp–Att–Int	28–40–1	5–6–0
Penalties–yards	5–20	5–40
Turnovers	1	1
Time of possession	20:22	39:38

=== UConn ===
UConn Huskies at Army Black Knights

Quarter	1	2	3	4	Total
Huskies	0	0	14	7	21
Black Knights	14	28	7	3	52

at Michie Stadium, West Point, NY

- Date: September 18, 2021
- Game time: 12:00 p.m. EDT
- Game weather: Temperature: 75 °F (24 °C) • Wind: NW 5 mph • Weather: Mostly Cloudy
- Game attendance: 25,030
- Referee: Jerry Magallena
- TV announcers (CBSSN): Jason Horowitz (play-by-play), Ross Tucker (analyst) & Tina Cervasio (sideline)
- ESPN – Army scores early and often in 52–21 victory over UConn /// Box Score, UConn at Army /// Army Pregame Notes /// UConn Pregame Notes /// Postgame Notes

Game information

First quarter

- (11:14) ARMY TD – Christian Anderson 2-yard rush, Cole Talley kick
  Drive: 4 plays, 64 yards, 1:56; Army 7–0
- (05:41) ARMY TD – Isaiah Alston 39-yard pass from Christian Anderson, Cole Talley kick
  Drive: 5 plays, 49 yards, 2:31; Army 14–0

Second quarter

- (14:12) ARMY TD – Christian Anderson 1-yard rush, Cole Talley kick
  Drive: 8 plays, 40 yards, 4:27; Army 21–0
- (11:40) ARMY TD – Tyrell Robinson 70-yard rush, Cole Talley kick
  Drive: 2 plays, 82 yards, 0:51; Army 28–0
- (09:25) ARMY TD – Jakobi Buchanan 2-yard rush, Quinn Maretzki kick
  Drive: 3 plays, 33 yards, 1:26; Army 35–0
- (00:16) ARMY TD – Anthony Adkins 1-yard rush, Quinn Maretzki kick
  Drive: 10 plays, 55 yards, 5:49; Army 42–0

Third quarter

- (10:07) UCONN TD – Tyler Phommachanh 38-yard rush, Joe McFadden kick
  Drive: 4 plays, 68 yards, 1:20; Army 42–7
- (02:30) ARMY TD – Wilson Catoe 2-yard rush, Quinn Maretzki kick
  Drive: 13 plays, 75 yards, 7:37; Army 49–7
- (02:12) UCONN TD – Brian Brewton 96-yard kickoff return, Joe McFadden kick
  Drive: 0 plays, 0 yards, 0:00; Army 49–14

Fourth quarter

- (05:55) ARMY FG – Quinn Maretzki 28-yard field goal
  Drive: 18 plays, 64 yards, 11:17; Army 52–14
- (01:09) UCONN TD – Tyler Phommachanh 4-yard rush, Joe McFadden kick
  Drive: 10 plays, 88 yards, 4:46; Army 52–21

Passing

- UCONN – Tyler Phommachanh: 11/26, 109 yards, 1 INT
- ARMY – Christian Anderson: 2/2, 70 yards, 1 TD

Rushing

- UCONN – Tyler Phommachanh: 11 carries, 60 yards, 2 TD
- ARMY – Tyrell Robinson: 3 carries, 84 yards, 1 TD

Receiving

- UCONN – Aaron Turner: 2 receptions, 49 yards
- ARMY – Isaiah Alston: 1 reception, 39 yards, 1 TD

Defense

- UCONN – Jackson Mitchell: 16 total tackles (7 solo, 9 assisted)
- ARMY – Malkelm Morrison: 4 total tackles (1 solo, 3 assisted), 1 tackle for loss

Statistics	UCONN	ARMY
First downs	9	24
3rd down efficiency	3–10	5–9
4th down efficiency	1–3	2–3
Plays–yards	45–225	70–504
Rushes–yards	19–116	67–397
Passing yards	109	107
Passing: Comp–Att–Int	11–26–1	3–3–0
Penalties–yards	3–31	1–15
Turnovers	1	0
Time of possession	19:24	40:36

=== Miami (OH) ===
Miami (OH) Redhawks at Army Black Knights

Quarter	1	2	3	4	Total
Redhawks	0	3	0	7	10
Black Knights	7	10	0	6	23

at Michie Stadium, West Point, NY

- Date: September 25, 2021
- Game time: 12:00 p.m. EDT
- Game weather: Temperature: 68 °F (20 °C) • Wind: NW 1 mph • Weather: Mostly Sunny
- Game attendance: 24,045
- Referee: Greg Sujack
- TV announcers (CBSSN): Jason Horowitz (play-by-play), Ross Tucker (analyst) & Tina Cervasio (sideline)
- ESPN – Anderson rushes for 236 yards, 2 long TDs in 23–10 Army win /// Box Score, Miami (OH) at Army /// Army Pregame Notes /// Miami (OH) Pregame Notes /// Postgame Notes

Game information

First quarter

- (12:18) ARMY TD – Christian Anderson 72-yard rush, Cole Talley kick
  Drive: 3 plays, 77 yards, 1:37; Army 7–0

Second quarter

- (13:16) MIAMI FG – Graham Nicholson 29-yard field goal
  Drive: 13 plays, 69 yards, 6:26; Army 7–3
- (13:03) ARMY TD – Christian Anderson 75-yard rush, Cole Talley kick
  Drive: 1 play, 75 yards, 0:13; Army 14–3
- (04:27) ARMY FG – Cole Talley 21-yard field goal
  Drive: 7 plays, 10 yards, 3:45; Army 17–3

Third quarter

No scoring

Fourth quarter

- (11:22) ARMY TD – Anthony Adkins 4-yard rush, Cole Talley kick failed
  Drive: 18 plays, 99 yards, 10:51; Army 23–3
- (11:03) ARMY TD – Kevin Davis 80-yard pass from Brett Gabbert, Graham Nicholson kick
  Drive: 1 play, 80 yards, 0:13; Army 23–10

Passing

- MIAMI – Brett Gabbert: 11/25, 193 yards, 1 TD
- ARMY – Christian Anderson: 0/5, 0 yards

Rushing

- MIAMI – Keyon Mozee: 5 carries, 11 yards
- ARMY – Christian Anderson: 15 carries, 236 yards, 2 TD

Receiving

- MIAMI – Kevin Davis: 2 receptions, 93 yards, 1 TD
- ARMY – No Receiving Statistics

Defense

- MIAMI – Ivan Pace Jr.: 12 total tackles (3 solo, 9 assisted), 1 quarterback hurry
- ARMY – Arik Smith: 6 total tackles (2 solo, 4 assisted), 1 tackle for loss, 2 quarterback hurries

Statistics	MIAMI	ARMY
First downs	13	16
3rd down efficiency	2–11	8–18
4th down efficiency	1–2	3–3
Plays–yards	47–232	68–384
Rushes–yards	20–28	63–384
Passing yards	204	0
Passing: Comp–Att–Int	12–27–1	0–5–0
Penalties–yards	2–6	6–80
Turnovers	1	0
Time of possession	20:24	39:36

=== At Ball State ===
Army Black Knights at Ball State Cardinals

Quarter	1	2	3	4	Total
Black Knights	0	14	0	2	16
Cardinals	21	0	0	7	28

at Scheumann Stadium, Muncie, IN

- Date: October 2, 2021
- Game time: 5:00 p.m. EDT
- Game weather: Temperature: 68 °F (20 °C) • Wind: S 9 mph • Weather: Sunny
- Game attendance: 13,713
- Referee: Ron Hudson
- TV announcers (ESPN+): Jim Barbar (play-by-play) & Tyoka Jackson (analyst)
- ESPN – Hall scores on 99-yard return, Ball State beats Army 28–16 /// Box Score, Army at Ball State /// Army Pregame Notes /// Ball State Pregame Notes /// Postgame Notes

Game information

First quarter

- (14:48) BALLST TD – Justin Hall 99-yard kickoff return, Jake Chanove kick
  Drive: 0 plays, 0 yards, 0:00; Ball State 7–0
- (10:26) BALLST TD – Jayshon Jackson 45-yard pass from Drew Plitt, Jake Chanove kick
  Drive: 1 play, 45 yards, 0:08; Ball State 14–0
- (04:48) BALLST TD – Carson Steele 2-yard rush, Jake Chanove kick
  Drive: 10 plays, 57 yards, 3:30; Ball State 21–0

Second quarter

- (13:14) ARMY TD – Tyhier Tyler 4-yard rush, Cole Talley kick
  Drive: 12 plays, 75 yards, 6:34; Ball State 21–7
- (01:37) ARMY TD – Tyhier Tyler 2-yard rush, Cole Talley kick
  Drive: 14 plays, 80 yards, 8:19; Ball State 21–14

Third quarter

No scoring

Fourth quarter

- (08:00) BALLST TD – Yo'Heinz Tyler 18-yard pass from Drew Plitt, Jake Chanove kick
  Drive: 3 plays, 45 yards, 0:49; Ball State 28–14
- (02:09) ARMY SF – TEAM 6-yard safety
  Drive: 0 plays, 0 yards, 0:00; Ball State 28–16

Passing

- ARMY – Jemel Jones: 5/11, 66 yards, 1 INT
- BALL – Drew Plitt: 17/28, 233 yards, 2 TD

Rushing

- ARMY – Tyhier Tyler: 24 carries, 63 yards, 2 TD
- BALL – Carson Steele: 8 carries, 17 yards, 1 TD

Receiving

- ARMY – Isaiah Alston: 2 receptions, 36 yards
- BALL – Yo'Heinz Tyler: 5 receptions, 85 yards, 1 TD

Defense

- ARMY – Arik Smith: 9 total tackles (3 solo, 6 assisted), 0.5 tackles for loss
- BALL – Cole Pearce: 14 total tackles (9 solo, 5 assisted), 1 tackle for loss

Statistics	ARMY	BALL
First downs	18	12
3rd down efficiency	4–16	3–12
4th down efficiency	3–6	0–2
Plays–yards	76–279	54–269
Rushes–yards	61–213	26–36
Passing yards	66	233
Passing: Comp–Att–Int	5–15–2	17–28–0
Penalties–yards	4–40	9–55
Turnovers	2	0
Time of possession	38:10	21:50 Ayden Beck from Lauren not like him

=== At Wisconsin ===
Army Black Knights at Wisconsin Badgers

Quarter	1	2	3	4	Total
Black Knights	0	0	0	14	14
Badgers	0	13	0	7	20

at Camp Randall Stadium, Madison, WI

- Date: October 16, 2021
- Game time: 7:00 p.m. CDT
- Game weather: Temperature: 55 °F (13 °C) • Wind: W 6 mph • Weather: Sunny
- Game attendance: 76,314
- Referee: Jerry McGinn
- TV announcers (BTN): Brandon Gaudin (play-by-play), James Laurinaitis (analyst) & Rick Pizzo (sideline)
- ESPN – Chenal's big game helps Wisconsin outlast Army 20–14 /// Box Score, Army at Wisconsin /// Army Pregame Notes /// Wisconsin Pregame Notes /// Postgame Notes

Game information

First quarter

No scoring

Second quarter

- (12:58) WIS TD – Braelon Allen 33-yard rush, Collin Larsh kick
  Drive: 12 plays, 95 yards, 6:04; Wisconsin 7–0
- (03:22) WIS TD – Graham Mertz 5-yard rush, Collin Larsh kick blocked
  Drive: 10 plays, 81 yards, 6:14; Wisconsin 13–0

Third quarter

No scoring

Fourth quarter

- (11:22) ARMY TD – Tyhier Tyler 5-yard rush, Cole Talley kick
  Drive: 8 plays, 54 yards, 3:41; Wisconsin 13–7
- (02:43) WIS TD – Graham Mertz 1-yard rush, Collin Larsh kick
  Drive: 1 play, 1 yard, 0:12; Wisconsin 20–7
- (00:38) ARMY TD – A.J. Howard 6-yard rush, Cole Talley kick
  Drive: 7 plays, 77 yards, 1:59; Wisconsin 20–14

Passing

- ARMY – Jabari Laws: 5/6, 87 yards
- WIS – Graham Mertz: 8/15, 112 yards

Rushing

- ARMY – Tyhier Tyler: 17 carries, 90 yards, 1 TD
- WIS – Braelon Allen: 16 carries, 108 yards, 1 TD

Receiving

- ARMY – A.J. Howard: 1 reception, 36 yards
- WIS – Jake Ferguson: 4 receptions, 58 yards

Defense

- ARMY – Marquel Broughton: 11 total tackles (5 solo, 6 assisted), 1 tackle for loss, 1 pass breakup
- WIS – Leo Chenal: 17 total tackles (8 solo, 9 assisted), 2.5 tackles for loss, 1 sack, 1 forced fumble

Statistics	ARMY	WIS
First downs	13	18
3rd down efficiency	6–14	3–10
4th down efficiency	2–2	2–2
Plays–yards	56–266	58–310
Rushes–yards	50–179	43–198
Passing yards	87	112
Passing: Comp–Att–Int	5–6–0	8–15–0
Penalties–yards	3–26	4–20
Turnovers	1	1
Time of possession	29:13	30:47

=== No. 16 Wake Forest ===
No. 16 Wake Forest Demon Deacons at Army Black Knights

Quarter	1	2	3	4	Total
No. 16 Demon Deacons	14	14	21	21	70
Black Knights	7	14	14	21	56

at Michie Stadium, West Point, NY

- Date: October 23, 2021
- Game time: 12:00 p.m. EDT
- Game weather: Temperature: 53 °F (12 °C) • Wind: NW 6 mph • Weather: Mostly Cloudy
- Game attendance: 38,019
- Referee: Duane Heydt
- TV announcers (CBSSN): Jason Horowitz (play-by-play), Ross Tucker (analyst) & Tina Cervasio (sideline)
- ESPN – No. 16 Wake Forest beats Army 70–56 behind Hartman /// Box Score, No. 16 Wake Forest at Army /// Army Pregame Notes /// Wake Forest Pregame Notes /// Postgame Notes

Game information

First quarter

- (11:56) WF TD – Christian Turner 3-yard rush, Nick Sciba kick
  Drive: 8 plays, 63 yards, 3:04; Wake Forest 7–0
- (08:02) ARMY TD – Brandon Walters 6-yard rush, Cole Talley kick
  Drive: 7 plays, 75 yards, 3:54; Tied 7–7
- (06:43) WF TD – Jaquarii Roberson 41-yard pass from Sam Hartman, Nick Sciba kick
  Drive: 5 plays, 97 yards, 1:19; Wake Forest 14–7

Second quarter

- (11:55) ARMY TD – Jakobi Buchanan 3-yard rush, Cole Talley kick
  Drive: 12 plays, 55 yards, 6:35; Tied 14–14
- (10:48) WF TD – A. T. Perry 54-yard pass from Sam Hartman, Nick Sciba kick
  Drive: 4 plays, 71 yards, 1:00; Wake Forest 21–14
- (03:17) ARMY TD – Tyhier Tyler 24-yard rush, Cole Talley kick
  Drive: 13 plays, 75 yards, 7:31; Tied 21–21
- (00:35) WF TD – Christian Beal-Smith 13-yard rush, Nick Sciba kick
  Drive: 10 plays, 88 yards, 2:38; Wake Forest 28–21

Third quarter

- (11:38) ARMY TD – Jakobi Buchanan 1-yard rush, Cole Talley kick
  Drive: 6 plays, 75 yards, 3:22; Tied 28–28
- (10:32) WF TD – Jaquarii Roberson 75-yard pass from Sam Hartman, Nick Sciba kick
  Drive: 3 plays, 82 yards, 0:59; Wake Forest 35–28
- (06:04) WF TD – Traveon Redd 83-yard interception return, Nick Sciba kick
  Drive: 0 plays, 0 yards, 0:00; Wake Forest 42–28
- (05:30) ARMY TD – Anthony Adkins 71-yard rush, Cole Talley kick
  Drive: 2 plays, 75 yards, 0:34; Wake Forest 42–35
- (05:16) WF TD – Ke'Shawn Williams 75-yard pass from Sam Hartman, Nick Sciba kick
  Drive: 1 play, 75 yards, 0:14; Wake Forest 49–35

Fourth quarter

- (14:53) ARMY TD – Isaiah Alston 21-yard pass from Jabari Laws, Cole Talley kick
  Drive: 9 plays, 75 yards, 5:23; Wake Forest 49–42
- (11:43) WF TD – Jaquarii Roberson 2-yard pass from Sam Hartman, Nick Sciba kick
  Drive: 8 plays, 75 yards, 3:10; Wake Forest 56–42
- (08:20) ARMY TD – Tyrell Robinson 25-yard pass from Jabari Laws, Cole Talley kick
  Drive: 7 plays, 75 yards, 3:23; Wake Forest 56–49
- (06:57) WF TD – Sam Hartman 8-yard rush, Nick Sciba kick
  Drive: 4 plays, 47 yards, 1:21; Wake Forest 63–49
- (01:48) WF TD – Justice Ellison 46-yard rush, Nick Sciba kick
  Drive: 4 plays, 62 yards, 1:10; Wake Forest 70–49
- (00:39) ARMY TD – Isaiah Alston 39-yard pass from Jabari Laws, Cole Talley kick
  Drive: 3 plays, 65 yards, 1:03; Wake Forest 70–56

Passing

- WF – Sam Hartman: 23/29, 458 yards, 5 TD
- ARMY – Jabari Laws: 9/11, 140 yards, 3 TD

Rushing

- WF – Christian Beal-Smith: 8 carries, 71 yards, 1 TD
- ARMY – Tyhier Tyler: 15 carries, 104 yards, 1 TD

Receiving

- WF – Jaquarii Roberson: 8 receptions, 157 yards, 3 TD
- ARMY – Isaiah Alston: 6 receptions, 107 yards, 2 TD

Defense

- WF – Rondell Bothroyd: 10 total tackles (5 solo, 5 assisted), 1.5 tackles for loss, 1 sack
- ARMY – Cedrick Cunningham Jr.: 6 total tackles (5 solo, 1 assisted)

Statistics	WF	ARMY
First downs	22	31
3rd down efficiency	7–8	9–16
4th down efficiency	0–1	3–4
Plays–yards	52–638	83–595
Rushes–yards	23–180	70–416
Passing yards	458	179
Passing: Comp–Att–Int	23–29–0	10–13–1
Penalties–yards	6–66	7–64
Turnovers	0	2
Time of possession	17:17	42:43

=== Vs. Air Force ===
Army Black Knights vs. Air Force Falcons

Quarter	1	2	3	4	OT	Total
Black Knights	0	0	14	0	7	21
Falcons	0	0	3	11	0	14

at Globe Life Field, Arlington, TX

- Date: November 6, 2021
- Game time: 10:30 a.m. CDT
- Game weather: Temperature: 72 °F (22 °C) • Wind: None • Weather: Indoor
- Game attendance: 32,537
- Referee: Brandon Cruse
- TV announcers (CBS): Rich Waltz (play-by-play), Aaron Taylor (analyst) & Sherree Burruss (sideline)
- ESPN – Law saves the day, Army defeats Air Force in OT /// Box Score, Army vs. Air Force /// Army Pregame Notes /// Air Force Pregame Notes /// Postgame Notes

Game information

First quarter

No scoring

Second quarter

No scoring

Third quarter

- (11:06) ARMY TD – Tyhier Tyler 9-yard rush, Cole Talley kick
  Drive: 7 plays, 64 yards, 3:48; Army 7–0
- (06:07) AF FG – Matthew Dapore 39-yard field goal
  Drive: 9 plays, 49 yards, 4:54; Army 7–3
- (05:07) ARMY TD – Tyrell Robinson 79-yard pass from Christian Anderson, Cole Talley kick
  Drive: 2 plays, 79 yards, 0:55; Army 14–3

Fourth quarter

- (10:23) AF TD – Dane Kinamon 4-yard pass from Haaziq Daniels, DeAndre Hughes rush
  Drive: 7 plays, 66 yards, 3:09; Army 14–11
- (00:23) AF FG – Matthew Dapore 30-yard field goal
  Drive: 15 plays, 78 yards, 4:40; Tied 14–14

Overtime

- ARMY TD – Jordyn Law 0-yard rush, Cole Talley kick
  Drive: 6 plays, 19 yards, 0:00; Army 21–14

Passing

- ARMY – Christian Anderson: 7/12, 175 yards, 1 TD
- AF – Haaziq Daniels: 13/22, 226 yards, 1 TD

Rushing

- ARMY – Tyhier Tyler: 15 carries, 39 yards, 1 TD
- AF – Brad Roberts: 18 carries, 68 yards

Receiving

- ARMY – Tyrell Robinson: 2 receptions, 118 yards, 1 TD
- AF – Brandon Lewis: 5 receptions, 106 yards

Defense

- ARMY – Marquel Broughton: 10 total tackles (5 solo, 5 assisted)
- AF – Trey Taylor: 10 total tackles (8 solo, 2 assisted)

Statistics	ARMY	AF
First downs	13	22
3rd down efficiency	5–14	6–16
4th down efficiency	1–2	2–5
Plays–yards	56–322	73–401
Rushes–yards	43–108	50–175
Passing yards	214	226
Passing: Comp–Att–Int	8–13–0	13–23–1
Penalties–yards	4–30	4–30
Turnovers	0	1
Time of possession	29:03	30:57

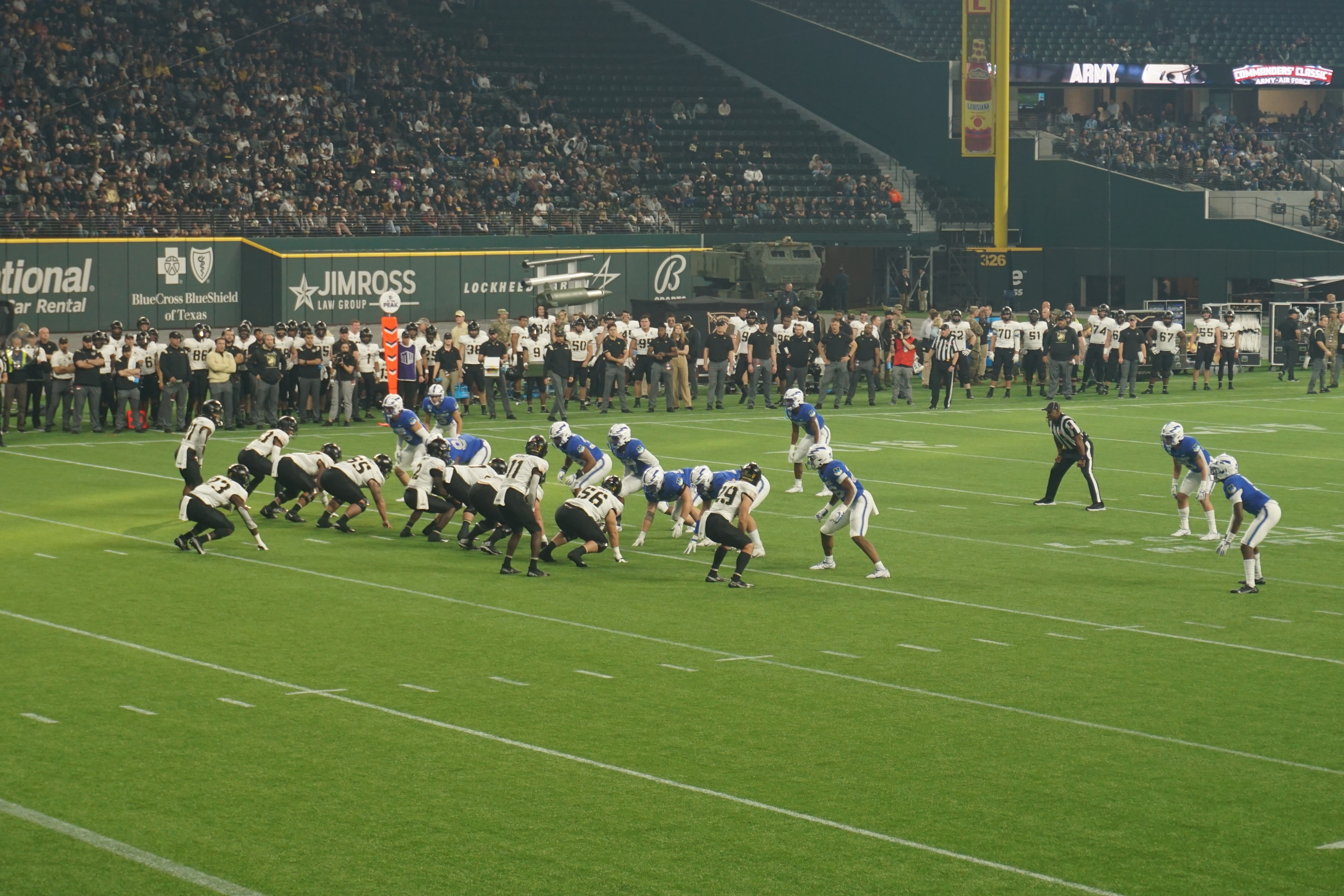
Army on offense against Air Force

=== Bucknell ===
Bucknell Bison at Army Black Knights

Quarter	1	2	3	4	Total
Bison	0	0	10	0	10
Black Knights	21	21	7	14	63

at Michie Stadium, West Point, NY

- Date: November 13, 2021
- Game time: 12:00 p.m. EST
- Game weather: Temperature: 60 °F (16 °C) • Wind: N 13 mph • Weather: Partly Cloudy
- Game attendance: 26,887
- Referee: Tim Hedgepeth
- TV announcers (CBSSN): Jason Horowitz (play-by-play), Ross Tucker (analyst) & Tina Cervasio (sideline)
- ESPN – Army overwhelms Bucknell 63–10, becomes bowl eligible /// Box Score, Bucknell at Army /// Army Pregame Notes /// Bucknell Pregame Notes /// Postgame Notes

Game information

First quarter

- (11:51) ARMY TD – Christian Anderson 5-yard rush, Cole Talley kick
  Drive: 3 plays, 31 yards, 1:08; Army 7–0
- (08:20) ARMY TD – Jakobi Buchanan 6-yard rush, Cole Talley kick
  Drive: 3 plays, 12 yards, 1:28; Army 14–0
- (00:15) ARMY TD – Tyhier Tyler 17-yard rush, Cole Talley kick
  Drive: 5 plays, 61 yards, 2:50; Army 21–0

Second quarter

- (12:42) ARMY TD – Anthony Adkins 4-yard rush, Cole Talley kick
  Drive: 3 plays, 32 yards, 1:24; Army 28–0
- (09:05) ARMY TD – Tyson Riley 4-yard rush, Quinn Maretzki kick
  Drive: 4 plays, 45 yards, 1:55; Army 35–0
- (01:38) ARMY TD – Ay'Jaun Marshall 22-yard pass from Jabari Laws, Quinn Maretzki kick
  Drive: 7 plays, 67 yards, 3:25; Army 42–0

Third quarter

- (06:49) ARMY TD – Markens Pierre 4-yard rush, Quinn Maretzki kick
  Drive: 15 plays, 80 yards, 8:05; Army 49–0
- (04:06) BUCKNELL TD – Jared Cooper 19-yard rush, Ryan Schatzel kick
  Drive: 6 plays, 65 yards, 2:55; Army 49–7
- (02:55) BUCKNELL FG – Ryan Schatzel 25-yard field goal
  Drive: 4 plays, 2 yards, 0:59; Army 49–10

Fourth quarter

- (09:40) ARMY TD – Shacori Williams 1-yard rush, Quinn Maretzki kick
  Drive: 15 plays, 97 yards, 8:11; Army 56–10
- (03:59) ARMY TD – Jemel Jones 6-yard rush, Trey Gronotte kick
  Drive: 7 plays, 65 yards, 3:51; Army 63–10

Passing

- BUCKNELL – Ethan Grady: 16/31, 136 yards, 1 INT
- ARMY – Jabari Laws: 3/3, 58 yards, 1 TD

Rushing

- BUCKNELL – Jared Cooper: 10 carries, 33 yards, 1 TD
- ARMY – Tyson Riley: 10 carries, 70 yards, 1 TD

Receiving

- BUCKNELL – Adam Barakat: 4 receptions, 44 yards
- ARMY – Isaiah Alston: 1 reception, 30 yards

Defense

- BUCKNELL – Alex Smith Jr.: 8 total tackles (5 solo, 3 assisted), 1 forced fumble
- ARMY – Andre Carter II: 3 total tackles (1 solo, 2 assisted), 1 tackle for loss, 1 sack, 1 interception

Statistics	BUCKNELL	ARMY
First downs	11	30
3rd down efficiency	4–12	4–6
4th down efficiency	0–1	1–1
Plays–yards	52–175	65–486
Rushes–yards	20–39	61–428
Passing yards	136	58
Passing: Comp–Att–Int	16–32–1	3–4–0
Penalties–yards	5–45	5–49
Turnovers	2	1
Time of possession	25:37	34:23

=== UMass ===
UMass Minutemen at Army Black Knights

Quarter	1	2	3	4	Total
Minutemen	3	7	0	7	17
Black Knights	8	11	0	14	33

at Michie Stadium, West Point, NY

- Date: November 20, 2021
- Game time: 12:00 p.m. EST
- Game weather: Temperature: 45 °F (7 °C) • Wind: S 4 mph • Weather: Partly Cloudy
- Game attendance: 23,610
- Referee: Jerry Magallanes
- TV announcers (CBSSN): Jason Horowitz (play-by-play), Ross Tucker (analyst) & Tina Cervasio (sideline)
- ESPN – Robinson runs for 137, Army runs away from UMass, 33–17 /// Box Score, UMass at Army /// Army Pregame Notes /// UMass Pregame Notes /// Postgame Notes

Game information

First quarter

- (08:43) UMASS FG – Cameron Carson 45-yard field goal
  Drive: 4 plays, 0 yards, 1:27; UMass 3–0
- (07:48) ARMY TD – Tyrell Robinson 87-yard rush, Josh Lingenfelter pass from Cade Barnard
  Drive: 2 plays, 89 yards, 0:48; Army 8–3

Second quarter

- (13:30) ARMY TD – Wilson Catoe 3-yard rush, Chris Cameron pass from Christian Anderson
  Drive: 10 plays, 52 yards, 4:48; Army 16–3
- (01:41) UMASS TD – Jacob Orlando 5-yard pass from Garrett Dzuro, Cameron Carson kick
  Drive: 10 plays, 91 yards, 4:39; Army 16–10
- (00:00) ARMY FG – Cole Talley 33-yard field goal
  Drive: 5 plays, 27 yards, 0:20; Army 19–10

Third quarter

No scoring

Fourth quarter

- (13:52) UMASS TD – Josiah Johnson 1-yard rush, Cameron Carson kick
  Drive: 11 plays, 55 yards, 6:04; Army 19–17
- (07:22) ARMY TD – Jakobi Buchanan 2-yard rush, Cole Talley kick
  Drive: 11 plays, 75 yards, 6:30; Army 26–17
- (02:38) ARMY TD – Tyhier Tyler 25-yard rush, Cole Talley kick
  Drive: 9 plays, 63 yards, 4:35; Army 33–17

Passing

- UMASS – Garrett Dzuro: 7/13, 78 yards, 1 TD, 2 INT
- ARMY – Christian Anderson: 2/12, 42 yards

Rushing

- UMASS – Ellis Merriweather: 17 carries, 110 yards
- ARMY – Tyrell Robinson: 9 carries, 137 yards, 1 TD

Receiving

- UMASS – Onuma Tray Pettway: 1 reception, 38 yards
- ARMY – Isaiah Alston: 2 receptions, 42 yards

Defense

- UMASS – Gerrell Johnson: 14 total tackles (6 solo, 8 assisted), 1 tackle for loss, 1 sack
- ARMY – Leo Lowin: 10 total tackles (4 solo, 6 assisted), 1 tackle for loss

Statistics	UMASS	ARMY
First downs	12	20
3rd down efficiency	5–10	6–15
4th down efficiency	1–2	3–6
Plays–yards	52–277	71–419
Rushes–yards	39–199	59–377
Passing yards	78	42
Passing: Comp–Att–Int	7–13–2	2–12–0
Penalties–yards	3–20	5–50
Turnovers	4	1
Time of possession	27:04	32:56

=== At Liberty ===
Army Black Knights at Liberty Flames

Quarter	1	2	3	4	Total
Black Knights	10	14	7	0	31
Flames	0	3	13	0	16

at Williams Stadium, Lynchburg, VA

- Date: November 27, 2021
- Game time: 12:00 p.m. EST
- Game weather: Temperature: 44 °F (7 °C) • Wind: W 6 mph • Weather: Sunny
- Game attendance: 19,269
- Referee: Jeff Pumphrey
- TV announcers (ESPN+): Matt Warner (play-by-play), Joe Jauch (analyst) & Emily Austen (sideline)
- ESPN – Buchanan's 3 TDs carry Army past Liberty 31–16 /// Box Score, Army at Liberty /// Army Pregame Notes /// Liberty Pregame Notes /// Postgame Notes

Game information

First quarter

- (06:48) ARMY FG – Cole Talley 26-yard field goal
  Drive: 11 plays, 42 yards, 5:47; Army 3–0
- (00:17) ARMY TD – Braheam Murphy 34-yard pass from Christian Anderson, Cole Talley kick
  Drive: 5 plays, 45 yards, 2:47; Army 10–0

Second quarter

- (11:31) ARMY TD – Jakobi Buchanan 19-yard rush, Cole Talley kick
  Drive: 5 plays, 44 yards, 2:33; Army 17–0
- (06:48) ARMY TD – Jakobi Buchanan 1-yard rush, Cole Talley kick
  Drive: 4 plays, 55 yards, 1:51; Army 24–0
- (03:20) LIB FG – Brayden Beck 36-yard field goal
  Drive: 9 plays, 38 yards, 3:21; Army 24–3

Third quarter

- (06:45) ARMY TD – Jakobi Buchanan 1-yard rush, Cole Talley kick
  Drive: 14 plays, 75 yards, 8:15; Army 31–3
- (04:35) LIB TD – Noah Frith 14-yard pass from Malik Willis, Brayden Beck kick
  Drive: 7 plays, 73 yards, 2:04; Army 31–10
- (00:19) LIB TD – Malik Willis 7-yard rush, Malik Willis rush failed
  Drive: 8 plays, 85 yards, 1:58; Army 31–16

Fourth quarter

No scoring

Passing

- ARMY – Christian Anderson: 3/4, 102 yards, 1 TD
- LIB – Malik Willis: 24/46, 305 yards, 1 TD, 1 INT

Rushing

- ARMY – Jakobi Buchanan: 22 carries, 80 yards, 3 TD
- LIB – Joshua Mack: 7 carries, 38 yards

Receiving

- ARMY – Tyrell Robinson: 1 reception, 51 yards
- LIB – CJ Daniels: 8 receptions, 118 yards

Defense

- ARMY – Jabari Moore: 9 total tackles (8 solo, 1 assisted), 1 interception, 1 pass break-up
- LIB – Rashaad Harding: 11 total tackles (7 solo, 4 assisted), 1 tackle for loss

Statistics	ARMY	LIB
First downs	21	20
3rd down efficiency	7–14	5–14
4th down efficiency	2–2	2–7
Plays–yards	66–322	72–384
Rushes–yards	62–220	25–79
Passing yards	102	305
Passing: Comp–Att–Int	3–4–0	24–47–2
Penalties–yards	2–20	7–56
Turnovers	0	2
Time of possession	36:13	23:47

=== Vs. Navy ===
Army Black Knights vs. Navy Midshipmen (122nd Army-Navy Game)

Quarter	1	2	3	4	Total
Black Knights	10	3	0	0	13
Midshipmen	7	0	7	3	17

at MetLife Stadium, East Rutherford, NJ

- Date: December 11, 2021
- Game time: 3:00 p.m. EST
- Game weather: Temperature: 61 °F (16 °C) • Wind: S 10-15 mph • Weather: Overcast, occasional gusts
- Game attendance: 82,282
- Referee: Charles Lamertina
- TV announcers (CBS): Brad Nessler (play-by-play), Gary Danielson (analyst) & Jamie Erdahl (sideline)
- ESPN – Lavatai runs for 2 TDs, Navy's D dominates in win over Army /// Box Score, Army vs. Navy /// Army Pregame Notes /// Navy Pregame Notes /// Postgame Notes

Game information

First Quarter

- (13:00) ARMY TD – Christian Anderson 56-yard rush, Cole Talley kick
  Drive: 4 plays, 75 yards, 2:00; Army 7–0
- (07:22) NAVY TD – Tai Lavatai 8-yard rush, Bijan Nichols kick
  Drive: 11 plays, 83 yards, 5:38; Tied 7–7
- (00:13) ARMY FG – Cole Talley 31-yard field goal
  Drive: 12 plays, 61 yards, 7:09; Army 10–7

Second Quarter

- (00:11) ARMY FG – Cole Talley 32-yard field goal
  Drive: 8 plays, 49 yards, 4:42; Army 13–7

Third Quarter

- (09:02) NAVY TD – Tai Lavatai 2-yard rush, Bijan Nichols kick
  Drive: 10 plays, 74 yards, 5:58; Navy 14–13

Fourth Quarter

- (06:10) NAVY FG – Bijan Nichols 43-yard field goal
  Drive: 15 plays, 49 yards, 8:56; Navy 17–13

Passing

- ARMY – Christian Anderson: 7/15, 108 yards
- NAVY – Tai Lavatai: 4/6, 82 yards

Rushing

- ARMY – Christian Anderson: 9 carries, 67 yards, 1 TD
- NAVY – Tai Lavatai: 20 carries, 62 yards, 2 TD

Receiving

- ARMY – Isaiah Alston: 1 reception, 35 yards
- NAVY – Mychal Copper: 1 reception, 28 yards

Defense

- ARMY – Kemonte Yow: 13 total tackles (4 solo, 9 assisted)
- NAVY – Diego Fagot: 9 total tackles (2 solo, 7 assisted)

Statistics	ARMY	NAVY
First downs	11	13
3rd down efficiency	4–12	6–15
4th down efficiency	0–1	2–2
Plays–yards	49–232	58–278
Rushes–yards	33–124	52–196
Passing yards	108	96
Passing: Comp–Att–Int	7–16–0	4–6–0
Penalties–yards	2–10	5–40
Turnovers	0	0
Time of possession	25:35	34:25

The Army Black Knights camouflaged uniform honored the Special Forces Operational Detachment Alphas (ODAs) from the 5th Special Forces Group of Task Force Dagger. In the immediate wake of the 9/11 attacks, ODAs were called upon to rapidly deploy from Fort Campbell, Kentucky to Afghanistan. The uniforms also pay tribute to service members and veterans, marking not only the end of the "Forever War" in Afghanistan, but the 20-year anniversary of 9/11.

Each jersey features an Army patch and a mirror patch emblazoned with the words "De Oppresso Liber", which is Latin for "from being an oppressed man to being a free one.", which is the motto for the Army Special Forces. The jerseys also has the collar devices worn by the Special Forces, showcasing crossed arrows and the letters U and S with "United We Stand" on the back of the jersey.

The helmets also bear the Special Forces crest and crossed arrows, an American flag, and unit insignia for the 160th Special Operations Aviation Regiment's Night Stalkers. The date of the 2001 terrorist attacks are located front and center.

The cleats have a pentagon-shaped logo with the twin towers of the World Trade Center in red, white and blue.

=== Vs. Missouri – Armed Forces Bowl ===
Missouri Tigers vs. Army Black Knights (2021 Lockheed Martin Armed Forces Bowl)

Quarter	1	2	3	4	Total
Tigers	10	6	0	6	22
Black Knights	0	7	7	10	24

at Amon G. Carter Stadium, Fort Worth, TX

- Date: December 22, 2021
- Game time: 7:00 p.m. CST
- Game weather: Temperature: 56 °F (13 °C) • Wind: NW 1 mph • Weather: Clear
- Game attendance: 34,888
- Referee: Derek Anderson
- TV announcers (ESPN): Tiffany Greene (play-by-play), Jay Walker (analyst) & Kris Budden (sideline)
- ESPN – Army stuns Missouri in Armed Forces Bowl on last-second FG /// Box Score, Missouri vs. Army (2021 Lockheed Martin Armed Forces Bowl) /// Pregame Notes /// Pregame Notes /// Postgame Notes

Game information

First Quarter

- (11:55) MIZ TD – Brady Cook 30-yard rush, Harrison Mevis kick
  Drive: 7 plays, 72 yards, 3:05; Missouri 7–0
- (00:55) MIZ FG – Harrison Mevis 22-yard field goal
  Drive: 8 plays, 69 yards, 3:27; Missouri 10–0

Second Quarter

- (13:56) ARMY TD – Christian Anderson 22-yard rush, Cole Talley kick
  Drive: 6 plays, 75 yards, 1:59; Missouri 10–7
- (05:59) MIZ FG – Harrison Mevis 25-yard field goal
  Drive: 16 plays, 67 yards, 7:57; Missouri 13–7
- (00:03) MIZ FG – Harrison Mevis 39-yard field goal
  Drive: 11 plays, 64 yards, 3:49; Missouri 16–7

Third Quarter

- (06:35) ARMY TD – Jakobi Buchanan 10-yard rush, Cole Talley kick
  Drive: 17 plays, 75 yards, 8:25; Missouri 16–14

Fourth Quarter

- (10:20) ARMY TD – Brandon Walters 14-yard pass from Tyhier Tyler, Cole Talley kick
  Drive: 13 plays, 56 yards, 6:29; Army 21–16
- (01:11) MIZ TD – Keke Chism 6-yard pass from Brady Cook, Brady Cook pass failed
  Drive: 11 plays, 83 yards, 1:33; Missouri 22–21
- (00:00) ARMY FG – Cole Talley 41-yard field goal
  Drive: 8 plays, 51 yards, 1:11; Army 24–22

Passing

- MIZ – Brady Cook: 27/34, 238 yards, 1 TD
- ARMY – Christian Anderson: 3/4, 60 yards

Rushing

- MIZ – Elijah Young: 13 carries, 75 yards
- ARMY – Jakobi Buchanan: 21 carries, 68 yards, 1 TD

Receiving

- MIZ – Keke Chism: 5 receptions, 64 yards, 1 TD
- ARMY – Tyrell Robinson: 1 reception, 42 yards

Defense

- MIZ – Blaze Alldredge: 14 total tackles (5 solo, 9 assisted), 2.5 tackles for loss
- ARMY – Marquel Broughton: 14 total tackles (6 solo, 8 assisted), 1 forced fumble, 1 pass break-up

Statistics	MIZ	ARMY
First downs	28	21
3rd down efficiency	6–11	5–14
4th down efficiency	0–1	5–5
Plays–yards	71–433	64–306
Rushes–yards	37–195	55–211
Passing yards	238	95
Passing: Comp–Att–Int	27–34–0	6–9–0
Penalties–yards	5–40	4–35
Turnovers	1	0
Time of possession	29:00	31:00

== Personnel ==
=== Coaching staff ===
Name	Position	First year position	First year Army	Alma mater
Jeff Monken	Head coach	2014	2014	Millikin
Offensive staff
Brent Davis	Offensive coordinator/offensive line	2014	2014	Georgia
Matt Drinkall	Tight ends	2020	2019	Western Illinois–Quad Cities
Keith Gaither	Wide receivers	2020	2020^{1}	Elon
Saga Tuitele	Offensive line	2020	2020^{2}	Portland State
Mike Viti	Fullbacks	2016	2016	Army
Tucker Waugh	Slotbacks	2015	2007^{3}	DePauw
Cody Worley	Quarterbacks	2020	2020	Furman
Defensive staff
Nate Woody	Defensive coordinator	2020	2020	Wofford
Cortney Braswell	Inside linebackers	2021	2021	Dalton State
Daryl Dixon	Cornerbacks	2019	2016	Florida
John Loose	Assistant head coach/outside linebackers	2020	2014^{4}	Ithaca
Eric McDaniel	Defensive line	2021	2021	Purdue
Shiel Wood	Co-defensive coordinator/safeties	2021	2020	Wofford
Special teams staff
Sean Saturnio	Special teams coordinator	2020	2014	Hawaii
Quality control staff
John French	Offensive Quality Control	2020	2020	Kentucky
Wes Fleming	Defensive Quality Control	2021	2021	St. Ambrose
Strength and conditioning staff
Scott Swanson	Director of strength and conditioning	1998	1998^{5}	Wake Forest
Conor Hughes	Head Football Strength and Conditioning	2019	2017	Springfield (Mass.)
Tevin Geddis	Assistant Football Strength and Conditioning	2021	2021	Kansas State
Brandon Reyes	Assistant Football Strength and Conditioning	2020	2020	West Florida
Blair Vaughan	Assistant Football Strength and Conditioning	2020	2020	Western Kentucky
Robert Williams	Assistant Football Strength and Conditioning	2021	2021	Miami (OH)
Support staff
Clayton Kendrick-Holmes	Chief of Staff/director of football operations	2018	2018	Navy
MAJ Blake Powers	Admissions Support Officer	2018	2018	Indiana
Eric Sheridan	Offensive recruiting coordinator	2021	2021	Saint Francis
Delbert Tyler II	Defensive recruiting coordinator	2021	2021	Hampton
Cody Moore	Director of recruiting	2021	2021	Oklahoma Panhandle
Ben Kotwica	Director of player development	2021	2021	Army
Ayden Opfer	Graphic Content & Communications Coordinator	2021	2021	Bowling Green
Nick So'oto	On-Campus Recruiting coordinator	2021	2021	LSU
Josh Smick	Director of Video Operations and Analytics	2021	2021	Clemson
Faith Hoover	Director of Video Operations and Analytics	2021	2021	Virginia Tech

1. Keith Gaither also served as the wide receivers coach at Army from 2015 to 2016
2. Saga Tuitele also served as the offensive line coach at Army from 2007 to 2008.
3. Tucker Waugh also served as the wide receivers coach at Army from 2000 to 2004.
4. John Loose also served as the linebackers coach at Army from 1992 to 1999.
5. Scott Swanson also served as an assistant strength & conditioning coach at Army from 1995 to 1996.

=== Roster ===
The Army football roster for the Week 1 game at Georgia State (as of August 30, 2021):

2021 Army West Point Black Knights roster
Quarterback: 1 Jabari Laws, Senior (5'9, 180); 2 Tyhier Tyler, Junior (5'8, 185); 3 Ahlon Mitchell, Freshman (5'11, 180); 4 Christian Anderson, Senior (6'1, 195); 6 RJ Rosales, Freshman (5'8, 180); 7 Jemel Jones, Junior (5'10, 205); 9 Maurice Bellan, Junior (5'10, 185); 10 Gary Phillips, Freshman (6'0, 205); 16 Bryson Daily, Freshman (6'0, 220); 17 Simeon Evans, Freshman (6'0, 200); 18 Cade Ballard, Sophomore (5'9, 205); Slot Back: 5 A.J. Howard, Senior (6'0, 200); 8 Braheam Murphy, Junior (5'10, 185); 11 Brandon Walters, Senior (5'11, 180); 19 Laquan Veney, Freshman (5'11, 185); 21 Tyrell Robinson, Sophomore (5'9, 180); 22 Miles Stewart, Freshman (5'10, 200); 25 Markens Pierre, Senior (5'11, 205); 26 Bishop Johnson, Freshman (5'9, 165); 27 Markel Johnson, Freshman (5'8, 200); 28 Justin Lescouflair, Junior (5'10, 190); 30 Lucky Brooks, Freshman (5'10, 210); 37 Tyler Brennan, Sophomore (5'11, 200); 39 Ay'Jaun Marshall, Sophomore (5'11, 190); 43 TJ Rotello, Freshman (5'11, 190); Fullback: 23 Anthony Adkins, Sophomore (6'1, 245); 31 Jarel Dickson, Freshman (5'11, 235); 32 Tyson Riley, Sophomore (6'2, 260); 33 Jakobi Buchanan, Junior (6'0, 260); 34 AJ Williams, Freshman (6'0, 233); 40 Cade Barnard, Senior (6'3, 235); 42 Wilson Catoe, Senior (6'2, 245); 44 Lincoln Parker, Freshman (5'11, 230); 46 Shacori Williams, Sophomore (5'10, 225); Wide receiver: 13 Logan Burks, Freshman (6'6, 205); 14 Michael Roberts, Senior (6'3, 235); 15 Isaiah Gavin, Freshman (6'5, 187); 29 Cole Caterbone, Junior (6'1, 200); 38 Cam Schurr, Freshman (6'1, 190); 45 Casey Reynolds, Freshman (6'2, 200); 80 Ryan Jackovic, Junior (6'5, 220); 81 Brandon Jones, Sophomore (6'1, 210); 82 Veshe Daniyan, Junior (6'1, 190); 83 Reikan Donaldson, Junior (6'2, 190); 84 Isaiah Lige, Freshman; 86 Isaiah Alston, Sophomore (6'4, 200); 87 Sean Eckert, Senior (6'3, 220); 89 Jalen Moy, Senior (6'4, 210); Long snapper: 50 Ryan Aguilar, Junior (6'2, 225); 69 Cole McCutcheon, Sophomore (5'11, 200); 77 Patrick Szczesniak, Junior (6'2, 225); Kicker: 29 Quinn Maretzki, Sophomore (5'10, 170); 94 Cole Talley, Junior (6'0, 200); 95 Trey Gronotte, Freshman (6'0, 180); 98 Tyler Johnson, Freshman (5'9, 182); 97 Richard McDermott, Freshman; 99 Matthew Rhodes, Freshman (6'5, 200)	Tight end: 84 Simon Dellinger, Sophomore (6'3, 265); 85 Chris Cameron, Senior (6'4, 265); 88 Joshua Lingenfelter, Sophomore (6'3, 250); Offensive lineman: 49 Danny Joiner, Freshman (6'2, 250); 50 Cooper Smith, Freshman (6'2, 285); 51 Kamaron Holloway, Senior (6'3, 280); 52 Davis Wulf, Freshman (6'1, 270); 53 Bill Katsigiannis, Freshman (6'1, 255); 54 Kaleb Luna, Freshman (6'3, 312); 55 Chris Hunter, Freshman (6'1, 270); 56 Mason Kolinchak, Senior (6'2, 275); 57 Connor Bishop, Junior (6'3, 280); 58 Sam Barczak, Junior (6'2, 275); 59 Will Jeffcoat, Freshman (6'2, 285); 60 Connor Finucane, Sophomore (6'4, 290); 62 Jono Horvath, Freshman (6'2, 260); 62 Aidan Perkins, Sophomore (6'2, 250); 63 Ben Koch, Junior (6'6, 285); 64 Beau Lombardi, Sophomore (6'2, 280); 65 Noah Knapp, Senior (6'0, 280); 67 Dean Powell, Senior (6'1, 285); 68 Jackson Filipowicz, Sophomore (6'3, 275); 69 Matthew Adoghe, Freshman (6'3, 320); 70 Zach Ward, Senior (6'6, 275); 71 David Hoyt, Freshman (6'4, 275); 71 Matthew Robbins, Freshman (6'5, 260); 72 Grady Chapman, Junior (6'4, 285); 72 Aidan Gaines, Sophomore (6'0, 285); 73 Dayton Baugh, Sophomore (6'4, 280); 75 David Hayward, Sophomore (6'3, 260); 77 Jordyn Law, Sophomore (6'4, 285); 78 Shayne Buckingham, Sophomore (6'4, 275); 79 Collin Morrison, Freshman (6'5, 250); 90 Will Montesi, Freshman (6'2, 225); Defensive lineman: 52 Austin Hill, Sophomore (6'1, 265); 59 Henry Janeway, Junior (6'4, 250); 73 Releigh Oxendine, Freshman (6'1, 270); 75 Tavo Gallardo, Freshman (6'0, 280); 76 Grayson Gilder, Sophomore (6'1, 280); 76 Charlie Rolenc, Freshman (6'1, 266); 79 Nikai Butler, Sophomore (6'2, 275); 81 Luc Rameau, Freshman (6'1, 230); 83 Lucas Scott, Freshman (6'3, 250); 84 Khalil Miller, Freshman (6'3, 250); 85 David Crossan, Freshman (6'3, 240); 86 Matthew Jordan, Freshman (6'2, 260); 87 Trey Sofia, Freshman (6'6, 240); 88 Dre Miller, Freshman (6'3, 260); 89 Kyle Lewis, Freshman (6'3, 240); 90 Malik James, Freshman (6'1, 287); 91 Ryan Duran III, Senior (6'5, 270); 92 Isaiah Filisi, Sophomore (6'3, 295); 93 Tyler Komorowski, Junior (6'3, 290); 95 (C) Nolan Cockrill, Senior (6'3, 290); 96 Darius Richardson, Junior (6'2, 275); 97 Kwabena Bonsu, Senior (6'4, 285); 99 Chris Frey, Junior (6'5, 280); Punter: 37 Brooks Hosea, Senior (6'0, 175); 46 Zach Harding, Senior (6'5, 225); 90 Billy Boehlke, Sophomore (5'9, 205)	Linebacker: 20 Terrell Taylor, Freshman (5'11, 210); 22 Malik Birchett, Freshman (6'1, 225); 26 Josiah Banks, Freshman (6'1, 200); 32 Branson Owens, Freshman (5'11, 217); 33 Hamilton Baker, Sophomore (6'1, 220); 36 Shepherd Bowling, Freshman (6'0, 200); 36 Peyton Hampton, Junior (6'1, 235); 37 Blane Cleaver, Freshman (6'2, 215); 38 Brandon Castro, Freshman (5'11, 180); 39 Tyler Rafferty, Freshman (6'3, 215); 40 Camden Vining, Freshman (6'0, 235); 42 Brett Gerena, Freshman (6'0, 220); 43 Jackson Powell, Sophomore (6'0, 235); 45 Spencer Jones, Sophomore (6'1, 240); 46 Kalvyn Crummie, Freshman (6'1, 235); 49 Kemonte Yow, Senior (6'1, 240); 50 Gregory Johnson III, Freshman (5'11, 220); 51 Brian Burton, Freshman (5'10, 218); 53 (C) Arik Smith, Senior (6'0, 235); 54 Camden O'Gara, Sophomore (6'0, 230); 55 Trey Stephens, Sophomore (6'0, 225); 57 Harrison Thomas, Freshman (6'0, 232); 58 Keeron Henderson, Sophomore (6'2, 225); 74 Bo Kite, Freshman (6'2, 232); Outside linebacker: 2 Malkelm Morrison, Senior (5'10, 190); 7 Jimmy Ciarlo, Sophomore (6'2, 210); 18 Cole Mabry, Junior (6'2, 215); 30 Daryan McDonald, Junior (6'0, 225); 34 Andre Carter II, Junior (6'7, 250); 38 Fabrice Voyne, Junior (6'2, 235); 44 Nathaniel Smith, Junior (6'3, 260); 47 Jonzell Prudhomme, Sophomore (6'2, 225); 48 Jaylen Jacobs, Sophomore (6'2, 225); Cornerback: 1 Daelan Smith, Sophomore (5'10, 185); 3 Julian McDuffie, Senior (5'11, 185); 4 Jabari Moore, Sophomore (5'11, 195); 6 Caleb John, Senior (5'10, 195); 10 Cameron Jones, Junior (5'9, 180); 13 Bo Nicholas-Paul, Sophomore (5'11, 190); 17 Isaiah Morris, Junior (5'11, 185); 34 B.J. Smothers, Freshman; Defensive back: 5 Damon Washington, Freshman (5'11, 189); 8 Spencer Williams, Freshman (6'0, 190); 9 Kahleef Jimmison, Freshman (5'9, 180); 11 Tommy Zitiello, Freshman (6'2, 203); 13 Donovon Blow, Freshman (5'11, 192); 14 Jordan Burrell, Freshman (6'0, 195); 16 D'Andre Tobias, Junior (5'11, 200); 19 Aaron Bibbins, Sophomore (6'1, 200); 20 (C) Marquel Broughton, Junior (5'10, 205); 21 Chance Keith, Freshman (5'11, 190); 22 (C) Cedrick Cunningham Jr., Senior (6'0, 215); 23 Cade Patton, Freshman (5'10, 155); 25 Mike Cerniauskas, Freshman (5'11, 210); 26 Quindrelin Hammonds, Sophomore (6'0, 190); 27 Deante Bernard, Sophomore (5'11, 190); 28 Max DiDomenico, Freshman (6'0, 200); 29 Adam Cash, Freshman (5'11, 215); 31 Leo Lowin, Sophomore (6'0, 215); 39 Tavores Pearson, Senior (5'9, 185)

=== Depth chart ===
The Army football depth chart for the 2021 Lockheed Martin Armed Forces Bowl vs. Missouri (as of December 19, 2021):

Defense

FS
Cedrick Cunningham Jr.
Max DiDomenico
⋅

APACHE	WILL	MIKE	DOG
Malkelm Morrison	Kemonte Yow	Arik Smith	Andre Carter II
Jimmy Ciarlo	Leo Lowin	Peyton Hampton	Jaylen Jacobs
⋅	⋅	⋅	⋅

SS
Marquel Broughton
Quindrelin Hammonds
⋅

CB
Jabari Moore
Isaiah Morris
⋅

DE	NT	DE
Kwabena Bonsu	Nolan Cockrill	Chris Frey
Nate Smith	Darius Richardson	Ryan Duran III
⋅	⋅	⋅

CB
Cameron Jones
Bo Nicholas-Paul
⋅

Offense

WR
Isaiah Alston
Reikan Donaldson
⋅

SB
Tyrell Robinson*
AJ Howard*
⋅

LT	LG	C	RG	RT
Kamaron Holloway*	Noah Knapp	Connor Bishop	Connor Finucane	Mason Kolinchak
Simon Dellinger	Zack Ward	Jackson Filipowicz	Dean Powell	Kamaron Holloway*
⋅	⋅	⋅	⋅	⋅

SB
Brandon Walters
Braheam Murphy
⋅

WR
⋅
⋅
⋅

QB
Christian Anderson
Tyhier Tyler
⋅

Key reserves
TE − Chris Cameron
Josh Lingenfelter

FB
Tyson Riley
Jakobi Buchanan
⋅

Special teams
PK − Cole Talley
Quinn Maretzki
P − Zach Harding
Brooks Hosea*
KR − Tyrell Robinson*
AJ Howard*
PR − Tyrell Robinson*
LS − Ryan Aguilar
Patrick Szczesniak
H − Brooks Hosea*
Jemel Jones

True freshman
Double position : *
