= Eliah Drinkwitz =

American football coach (born 1983)

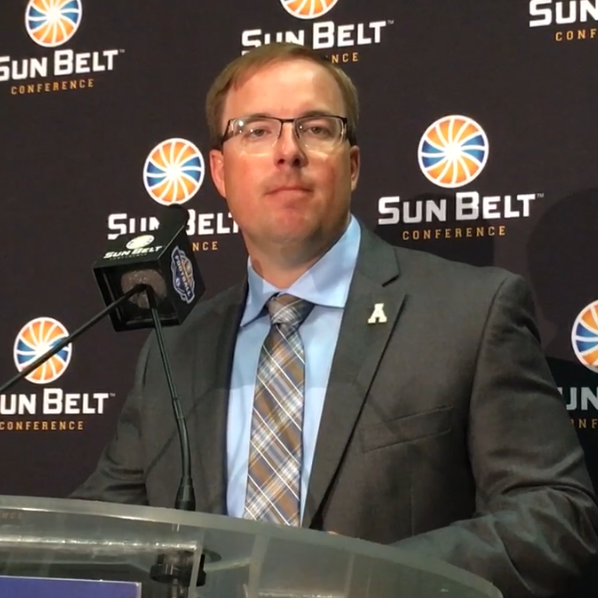
- Drinkwitz at 2019 Sun Belt Media Day

Current position
- Title: Head coach
- Team: Missouri
- Conference: SEC
- Record: 53–33
- Annual salary: $9 million

Biographical details
- Born: April 12, 1983 (age 43); Norman, Oklahoma, U.S.
- Education: Arkansas Tech (2004)

Coaching career (HC unless noted)
- 2005: Alma HS (AR) (assistant)
- 2006–2009: Springdale HS (AR) (OC)
- 2010–2011: Auburn (QC)
- 2012: Arkansas State (RB)
- 2013: Arkansas State (co-OC/RB)
- 2014: Boise State (TE)
- 2015: Boise State (OC/QB)
- 2016–2018: NC State (OC/QB)
- 2019: Appalachian State
- 2020–present: Missouri

Head coaching record
- Overall: 65–34 (.663)
- Bowls: 2–3 (.400)

Accomplishments and honors

Championships
- 1 Sun Belt (2019); 1 Sun Belt East Division (2019)

Awards
- 1 SEC Coach of the Year (2023)

Eliah Walter Drinkwitz (born April 12, 1983) is an American college football coach who is the head football coach at the University of Missouri, a position he has held since the 2020 season. He previously served as the head coach at Appalachian State University in 2019; prior to this, he served as an assistant coach for NC State, Boise State, Arkansas State, and Auburn.

Drinkwitz has yet to have a losing regular season record as a head coach. He won the Sun Belt Championship with Appalachian State in 2019, and was the SEC Coach of the Year in 2023.

== Coaching career ==
=== Auburn ===
After coaching at Springdale High School in Arkansas, where he coached with Gus Malzahn in 2006, Drinkwitz was hired by Auburn in 2009 to work on football operations as the quality control coach, and was on the coaching staff when Auburn won the 2010 National Championship under Gene Chizik.

=== Arkansas State ===
In 2012, after two successful seasons with Auburn, he followed Gus Malzahn to Arkansas State, where he spent the 2012 and 2013 seasons as running backs coach, and in 2013 also served as co-offensive coordinator.

=== Boise State ===
In 2014, when Arkansas State head coach Bryan Harsin became head coach at Boise State, Drinkwitz joined his staff as the tight ends coach. In 2015, he was promoted to offensive coordinator and quarterbacks coach.

=== NC State ===
In 2016, Drinkwitz was named offensive coordinator and quarterbacks coach at NC State. He served in this position for three seasons, during which he won two bowl games and won 25 games. The Wolfpack also finished at #23 in the AP Poll in 2017.

=== Appalachian State ===
On December 13, 2018, Drinkwitz was hired as the head coach at Appalachian State University. In his one season as head coach of the Mountaineers, he finished 12–1, with a victory over Louisiana in the 2019 Sun Belt championship. He did not coach their bowl game.

=== Missouri ===
On December 9, 2019, Drinkwitz was hired as the head coach of the Missouri Tigers, replacing Barry Odom. In his first season with Mizzou, the Tigers compiled a record of 5–5 in an all-SEC schedule, including a win over defending national champion LSU. Missouri was invited to the Music City Bowl to face Iowa, but the game was cancelled due to COVID-19.

In the 2021 season, Drinkwitz led Missouri to a 6–6 record with wins over Florida and South Carolina. Missouri was invited to the Armed Forces Bowl against Army, which they lost 24-22.

In the 2022 season, Drinkwitz again led Missouri to a 6–6 regular season record. Missouri was invited to the Gasparilla Bowl, where they lost to Wake Forest 27–17.

Drinkwitz led the Tigers to a breakout season in 2023, finishing the regular season 10–2 overall and 6–2 in the SEC. The Tigers won 5 games against AP Top 25 opponents, including wins over #15 Kansas State and #13 Tennessee. Missouri was selected to play the Ohio State Buckeyes in the Cotton Bowl, which the Tigers won 14–3. Drinkwitz was named the SEC Coach of the Year. On December 31, 2023, the University of Missouri announced a contract extension for Drinkwitz through the 2028 season which included a pay raise to $9 million for the 2024 season.

Missouri enjoyed continued success under Drinkwitz in 2024. In the regular season, Missouri finished 9-3 and set a program record for the most home wins in a season by going 7-0 at Faurot Field. After trailing 24-14 in the second half against Iowa, Mizzou scored the final 13 points to win the 2024 Music City Bowl. Mizzou finished with back to back 10 win seasons for the first time since 2013 and 2014.

On November 28, 2025, amid rumors of interest from schools including LSU, Auburn, Florida, and Penn State, Drinkwitz signed a six-year, $64.5 million contract extension to remain at Missouri. Missouri ended the 2025 regular season with an 8-4 record and lost the Gator Bowl to Virginia.

In the 2026 season, Drinkwitz ended Mizzou's nine game losing streak against AP Top 25 teams, defeated a top 10 team in the regular season first the first time, and led Mizzou to their largest win against an AP Top-10 opponent in a Week 5 win over No. 8 Florida.

== Personal life ==
Drinkwitz was born in Norman, Oklahoma to Jerry and Susie Drinkwitz, but his parents and older siblings moved to the Alma, Arkansas area in 1984 when he was a year old. Being raised in Alma and playing football for the Alma Airedales is what led him to want to become a football coach, especially hearing the stories of his father playing for Luther College in Decorah, Iowa, during the 1960s. During his time at Alma, he was an All-Conference and All-State selection and was named FCA Huddle Leader of the Year. Drinkwitz graduated from Alma in 2001 and was nominated by his high school to the Arkansas Times Academic All-Star Team.

In 2004, Drinkwitz graduated from Arkansas Tech University with a bachelor's degree in education. Drinkwitz and his wife, Lindsey, have four children.

== Head coaching record ==
Year	Team	Overall	Conference	Standing	Bowl/playoffs	Coaches^{#}	AP^{°}
Appalachian State Mountaineers (Sun Belt Conference) (2019)
2019	Appalachian State	12–1	8–1	1st (East)	New Orleans*	18	19
Appalachian State:		12–1	8–1	*Departed Appalachian State for Missouri before bowl game			
Missouri Tigers (Southeastern Conference) (2020–present)
2020	Missouri	5–5	5–5	3rd (Eastern)	Music City (Note: The 2020 Music City Bowl was canceled due to COVID-19 issues.)		
2021	Missouri	6–7	3–5	T-4th (Eastern)	L Armed Forces		
2022	Missouri	6–7	3–5	T-4th (Eastern)	L Gasparilla		
2023	Missouri	11–2	6–2	2nd (Eastern)	W Cotton^{†}	8	8
2024	Missouri	10–3	5–3	T–4th	W Music City	20	22
2025	Missouri	8–5	4–4	T–8th	L Gator		
2026	Missouri	7–4	4–4				
Missouri:		53–33	30–28				
Total:		65–34					
National championship Conference title Conference division title or championship game berth
^{†}Indicates Bowl Coalition, Bowl Alliance, BCS, or CFP / New Years' Six bowl.; ^{#}Rankings from final Coaches Poll.; ^{°}Rankings from final AP Poll.
