= 2021 Armed Forces Bowl =

Postseason college football bowl game

2021 Lockheed Martin Armed Forces Bowl
- 19th Armed Forces Bowl
Missouri Tigers	Army Black Knights
(6–6)	(8–4)
SEC	Independent
22	24
Head coach: Eliah Drinkwitz	Head coach: Jeff Monken
	1	2	3	4	Total
Missouri	10	6	0	6	22
Army	0	7	7	10	24
- Date: December 22, 2021
- Season: 2021
- Stadium: Amon G. Carter Stadium
- Location: Fort Worth, Texas
- MVP: Offensive: Brady Cook (QB, Missouri); Defensive: Arik Smith (LB, Army)
- Favorite: Missouri by 3.5
- Referee: Derek Anderson (Big 12)
- Attendance: 34,888

United States TV coverage
- Network: ESPN
- Announcers: Tiffany Greene (play-by-play), Jay Walker (analyst), and Kris Budden (sideline)

International TV coverage
- Network: ESPN Brazil
- Announcers: Matheus Pinheiro (play-by-play) and Weinny Eirado (analyst)

The 2021 Armed Forces Bowl was a college football bowl game played on December 22, 2021, with kickoff at 8:00 p.m. EST (7:00 p.m. local CST) on ESPN. It was the 19th edition of the Armed Forces Bowl, and was one of the 2021–22 bowl games concluding the 2021 FBS football season. The game was officially known as the Lockheed Martin Armed Forces Bowl after its corporate sponsor Lockheed Martin.

== Teams ==
While the bowl had tie-ins with the American Athletic Conference (AAC) and Conference USA (C-USA), the actual matchup featured a team from the Southeastern Conference (SEC) and an FBS independent.

This was the fifth meeting between Missouri and Army; entering the bowl, the Tigers led the all-time series, 3–2.

=== Missouri Tigers ===
Missouri entered the bowl with a 6–6 record (3–5 in SEC play). The Tigers played three ranked teams during the season—Texas A&M, Georgia, and Arkansas—losing each contest. Five of the Tigers' six wins came in their home stadium.

=== Army Black Knights ===
Army entered the bowl with an 8–4 overall record. After winning their first four games, the Knights fell to 4–3, then rallied to an 8–3 record before losing their final regular-season contest to Navy. Army lost to the only ranked team they faced, Wake Forest.

== Officials ==
The officials for the game came from the Big 12 Conference.

Referee: Derek Anderson

Umpire: Sheldon Davis

Head Linesman: Al Green

Line Judge: Quentin Givens

Side Judge: Mario Seneca

Field Judge: Scott Gaines

Back Judge: Lyndon Nixon

Center Judge: Darren Winkley

Replay Official: Mark Marsden

Communicator: Buddy Gingras

Alternate Official: Marvel July

== Game summary ==
2021 Northrop Grumman Armed Forces Bowl

Quarter	1	2	3	4	Total
Missouri	10	6	0	6	22
Army	0	7	7	10	24

at Amon G. Carter Stadium • Fort Worth, Texas

- Date: Wednesday, December 22, 2021
- Game weather: Clear • Temperature: 56 °F (13 °C) • Wind: 1 mph (1.6 km/h) NW
- Game attendance: 34,888
- TV announcers (ESPN): Tiffany Greene (play-by-play), Jay Walker (analyst), and Kris Budden (sideline)
- Box score

Game information

First quarter

- 11:55 MIZZ – Brady Cook 30-yard run, Harrison Mevis kick good. Drive: 7 plays, 72 yards, 3:05. Missouri 7–0
- 0:55 MIZZ – Harrison Mevis 22-yard field goal. Drive: 8 plays, 69 yards, 3:27. Missouri 10–0

Second quarter

- 13:56 ARMY – Christian Anderson 22-yard run, Cole Talley kick good. Drive: 6 plays, 75 yards, 1:59. Missouri 10–7
- 5:59 MIZZ – Harrison Mevis 25-yard field goal. Drive: 16 plays, 67 yards, 7:57. Missouri 13–7
- 0:03 MIZZ – Harrison Mevis 39-yard field goal. Drive: 11 plays, 64 yards, 3:49. Missouri 16–7

Third quarter

- 6:35 ARMY – Jakobi Buchanan 10-yard run, Cole Talley kick good. Drive: 17 plays, 75 yards, 8:25. Missouri 16–14

Fourth quarter

- 10:20 ARMY – Brandon Walters 14-yard pass from Tyhier Tyler, Cole Talley kick good. Drive: 13 plays, 56 yards, 6:29. Army 21–16
- 1:11 MIZZ – Keke Chism 6-yard pass from Brady Cook, two-point conversion pass incomplete. Drive: 11 plays, 83 yards, 1:33. Missouri 22–21
- 0:00 ARMY – Cole Talley 41-yard field goal. Drive: 8 plays, 51 yards, 1:11. Army 24–22

=== Statistics ===
Statistics	MIZZ	ARMY
First downs	28	21
Plays–yards	433	306
Rushes–yards	195	211
Passing yards	238	95
Passing: comp–att–int	27–34–0	6–9–0
Turnovers		
Time of possession	29:00	31:00

Team	Category	Player	Statistics
Missouri	Passing	Brady Cook	27/34, 238 yards, 1 TD
Missouri	Rushing	Elijah Young	13 carries, 75 yards
Missouri	Receiving	Keke Chism	5 receptions, 64 yards, 1 TD
Army	Passing	Christian Anderson	3/4, 60 yards
Army	Rushing	Jakobi Buchanan	21 carries, 68 yards, 1 TD
Army	Receiving	Tyrell Robinson	1 receptions, 42 yards
