= 2021 Missouri Tigers football team =

American college football season

2021 Missouri Tigers football

Armed Forces Bowl, L 22–24 vs. Army
- Conference: Southeastern Conference
- Eastern Division
- Record: 6–7 (3–5 SEC)
- Head coach: Eliah Drinkwitz (2nd season)
- Offensive scheme: Multiple
- Defensive coordinator: Steve Wilks (1st season)
- Base defense: 4–3
- Home stadium: Faurot Field

2021 Southeastern Conference football standings
	Conf.			Overall
Team	W		L	W		L
Eastern Division
No. 1 Georgia x#^	8	–	0	14	–	1
No. 18 Kentucky*	5	–	3	10	–	3
Tennessee	4	–	4	7	–	6
Missouri	3	–	5	6	–	7
South Carolina	3	–	5	7	–	6
Florida	2	–	6	6	–	7
Vanderbilt	0	–	8	2	–	10
Western Division
No. 2 Alabama x$^	7	–	1	13	–	2
No. 11 Ole Miss	6	–	2	10	–	3
No. 21 Arkansas	4	–	4	9	–	4
Mississippi State	4	–	4	7	–	6
Texas A&M	4	–	4	8	–	4
Auburn	3	–	5	6	–	7
LSU	3	–	5	6	–	7
Championship: Alabama 41, Georgia 24
# – College Football Playoff champion; ^ – College Football Playoff participant; $ – Conference champion; x – Division champion/co-champions; * – Kentucky vacated all wins due to NCAA violations.; Rankings from AP Poll

The 2021 Missouri Tigers football team represented the University of Missouri in the 2021 NCAA Division I FBS football season. The Tigers played their home games at Faurot Field in Columbia, Missouri, and competed in the Eastern Division of the Southeastern Conference (SEC). They were led by second-year head coach Eliah Drinkwitz.

== Schedule ==
Date	Time	Opponent	Site	TV	Result	Attendance
September 4	3:00 p.m.	Central Michigan*	Faurot Field; Columbia, MO	SECN	W 34–24	46,327
September 11	6:30 p.m.	at Kentucky	Kroger Field; Lexington, KY	SECN	L 28–35	58,437
September 18	11:00 a.m.	Southeast Missouri State*	Faurot Field; Columbia, MO	ESPN+/SECN+	W 59–28	46,598
September 25	11:00 a.m.	at Boston College*	Alumni Stadium; Chestnut Hill, MA	ESPN2	L 34–41 ^{OT}	44,500
October 2	11:00 a.m.	Tennessee	Faurot Field; Columbia, MO	SECN	L 24–62	45,655
October 9	3:00 p.m.	North Texas*	Faurot Field; Columbia, MO	SECN	W 48–35	46,985
October 16	11:00 a.m.	No. 21 Texas A&M	Faurot Field; Columbia, MO	SECN	L 14–35	48,139
October 30	2:00 p.m.	at Vanderbilt	Vanderbilt Stadium; Nashville, TN	SECN	W 37–28	19,821
November 6	11:00 a.m.	at No. 1 Georgia	Sanford Stadium; Athens, GA	ESPN	L 6–43	92,746
November 13	3:00 p.m.	South Carolina	Faurot Field; Columbia, MO	SECN	W 31–28	44,092
November 20	3:00 p.m.	Florida	Faurot Field; Columbia, MO	SECN	W 24–23 ^{OT}	47,818
November 26	2:30 p.m.	at No. 25 Arkansas	Donald W. Reynolds Razorback Stadium; Fayetteville, AR (Battle Line Rivalry)	CBS	L 17–34	67,320
December 22	7:00 p.m.	vs. Army*	Amon G. Carter Stadium; Fort Worth, TX (Armed Forces Bowl)	ESPN	L 22–24	34,888
*Non-conference game; Rankings from AP and CFP Rankings after November 2; All times are in Central time

== Game summaries ==
=== vs Central Michigan ===
Uniform Combination
Helmet (Oval Tiger)	Jersey	Pants

Game One - Central Michigan Chippewas (0–0) vs Missouri Tigers (0–0) – Game summary

Quarter	1	2	3	4	Total
Chippewas	7	7	0	10	24
Tigers	7	10	7	10	34

at Faurot Field • Columbia, Missouri

- Date: September 4
- Game time: 3:00 p.m.
- Game attendance: 46,237
- TV: SECN

Game information

First quarter
Second quarter
Third quarter
Fourth quarter

Statistics	CMU	MIZZ
First downs	27	26
Total Yards	475	468
Rushes–yards	39-174	36-211
Passing yards	301	257
Passing: comp–att–int	24-27-2	21-32-0
Turnovers	2	0
Time of possession	31:59	28:01

Team	Category	Player	Statistics
Central Michigan	Passing	Jacob Sirmon	23/45, 295 yards, 1 TD, 2 INTs
Central Michigan	Rushing	Lew Nichols III	19 carries, 135 yards, 1 TD
Central Michigan	Receiving	JaCorey Sullivan	8 receptions, 102 yards, 2 TDs
Missouri	Passing	Connor Bazelak	21/32, 257 yards, 2 TDs
Missouri	Rushing	Tyler Badie	25 carries, 203 yards, 1 TD
Missouri	Receiving	D'ionte Smith	2 receptions, 69 yards

=== at Kentucky ===
Uniform Combination
Helmet (Oval Tiger)	Jersey	Pants

Game Two - Missouri Tigers (1–0) vs Kentucky Wildcats (1–0) – Game summary

Quarter	1	2	3	4	Total
Tigers	7	7	7	7	28
Wildcats	14	7	7	7	35

at Kroger Field • Lexington, Kentucky

- Date: September 11
- Game time: 6:30 p.m.
- Game weather: Sunny, 74 degrees, S 8 mph
- Game attendance: 58,437
- Referee: Ken Williamson
- TV announcers (SECN): Taylor Zarzour (play-by-play), Matt Stinchcomb (color), Alyssa Lang (sideline)

Game information

First quarter
Second quarter
Third quarter
Fourth quarter

Statistics	MIZZ	UK
First downs	25	26
Total Yards	398	520
Rushing Yards	104	341
Passing yards	294	179
Turnovers	1	2
Time of possession	27:12	32:48

Team	Category	Player	Statistics
Missouri	Passing	Connor Bazelak	34/51, 294 yards, 4 TD’s, 1 INT
Missouri	Rushing	Tyler Badie	14 carries, 61 yards
Missouri	Receiving	Tyler Badie	10 receptions, 88 yards, 1 TD
Kentucky	Passing	Will Levis	10/18, 179 yards, 1 TD, 1 INT
Kentucky	Rushing	Chris Rodriguez Jr.	27 carries, 207 yards, 2 TD’s
Kentucky	Receiving	Wan'Dale Robinson	5 receptions, 101 yards

=== vs Southeast Missouri State (FCS) ===
Uniform Combination
Helmet (Block M)	Jersey	Pants

Game Three - Southeast Missouri State Redhawks (0–2) vs Missouri Tigers (1–1) – Game summary

Quarter	1	2	3	4	Total
Redhawks	0	0	7	21	28
Tigers	21	17	14	7	59

at Faurot Field • Columbia, Missouri

- Date: September 18
- Game time: 11:00 a.m.
- Game attendance: 46,598
- TV: SECN+/ESPN+

Game information

First quarter
Second quarter
Third quarter
Fourth quarter

Statistics	SEMO	MIZZ
First downs	19	26
Total Yards	373	675
Rushing Yards	294	231
Passing yards	79	444
Turnovers	1	0
Time of possession	27:21	32:39

Team	Category	Player	Statistics
SEMO	Passing	C.J. Ogbonna	7/14, 53 yards, 1 INT
SEMO	Rushing	C.J. Ogbonna	12 carries, 96 yards
SEMO	Receiving	Geno Hess	2 receptions, 31 yards
Missouri	Passing	Connor Bazelak	21/30, 346 yards, 3 TD
Missouri	Rushing	Tyler Badie	9 carries, 81 yards, 2 TD
Missouri	Receiving	Dominic Lovett	5 receptions, 81 yards

=== at Boston College ===
Uniform Combination
Helmet (Block M)	Jersey	Pants

Game Four - Missouri Tigers (2–1) vs Boston College Eagles (3–0) – Game summary

Quarter	1	2	3	4	OT	Total
Tigers	14	3	0	17	0	34
Eagles	7	10	10	7	7	41

at Alumni Stadium • Chestnut Hill, MA

- Date: September 25
- Game time: 11:00 a.m.
- Game attendance: 44,500
- TV: ESPN2

Game information

First quarter
Second quarter
Third quarter
Fourth quarter

Statistics	MIZZ	BC
First downs	22	23
Total Yards	391	450
Rushing Yards	88	275
Passing yards	303	175
Turnovers	2	1
Time of possession	25:49	34:11

Team	Category	Player	Statistics
Missouri	Passing	Connor Bazelak	30/41, 303 yards, 1 TD, 2 INT
Missouri	Rushing	Tyler Badie	18 carries, 72 yards, 2 TD
Missouri	Receiving	Tauskie Dove	3 receptions, 89 yards
Boston College	Passing	Dennis Grosel	18/29, 175 yards, 2 TD, 1 INT
Boston College	Rushing	Patrick Garwo III	25 carries, 175 yards, 2 TD
Boston College	Receiving	Zay Flowers	8 receptions, 62 yards, 1 TD

=== vs Tennessee ===
Uniform Combination
Helmet (Oval Tiger)	Jersey	Pants

Game Five - Tennessee Volunteers (2-2) at Missouri Tigers (2-2)

Quarter	1	2	3	4	Total
Volunteers	28	17	10	7	62
Tigers	3	7	7	7	24

at Faurot Field • Columbia, Missouri

- Date: October 2
- Game time: 11:00 a.m.
- Game weather: Rain, 72 °F (22 °C)
- Game attendance: 45,655
- Referee: David Smith
- TV announcers (SECN): Dave Neal (play-by-play), Deuce McAllister (color), and Andraya Carter (sidelines)

Game information

First quarter
Second quarter
Third quarter
Fourth quarter

Statistics	TENN	MIZZ
First downs	35	21
Total Yards	683	396
Rushing Yards	458	74
Passing yards	225	322
Turnovers	0	2
Time of possession	30:58	29:02

Team	Category	Player	Statistics
Tennessee	Passing	Hendon Hooker	15/19, 225 yards, 3 TD
Tennessee	Rushing	Tiyon Evan	15 carries, 156 yards, 3 TD
Tennessee	Receiving	Velus Jones Jr.	7 receptions, 79 yards, 1 TD
Missouri	Passing	Connor Bazelak	27/44, 322 yards, 2 INT
Missouri	Rushing	Tyler Badie	21 carries, 41 yards, 1 TD
Missouri	Receiving	Keke Chism	4 receptions, 76 yards

=== vs North Texas ===
	1	2	3	4	Total
Mean Green	0	7	7	21	35
Tigers	14	17	0	17	48

Statistics	UNT	MIZ
First downs	21	22
Total yards	493	474
Rushing yards	188	306
Passing yards	305	168
Turnovers	4	0
Time of possession	28:12	31:48

Team	Category	Player	Statistics
North Texas	Passing	Austin Aune	16/26, 305 yards, 4 TD, 2 INT
North Texas	Rushing	DeAndre Torrey	24 rushes, 85 yards
North Texas	Receiving	Damon Ward Jr.	2 receptions, 81 yards, TD
Missouri	Passing	Connor Bazelak	22/33, 168 yards, 2 TD
Missouri	Rushing	Tyler Badie	17 rushes, 209 yards, 2 TD
Missouri	Receiving	J. J. Hester	1 reception, 41 yards, TD

=== vs No. 21 Texas A&M ===
No. 21 Texas A&M Aggies at Missouri Tigers – Game summary

Quarter	1	2	3	4	Total
No. 21 Aggies	21	7	7	0	35
Tigers	0	7	7	0	14

at Faurot Field, Columbia, Missouri

- Date: October 16
- Game time: 11:00 a.m.
- Game weather: Temperature: 56 °F (13 °C) • Weather: Sunny • Wind: NW 13 MPH
- Game attendance: 48,139
- Referee: Ken Williamson
- TV announcers (SECN): Taylor Zarzour (play-by-play) and Matt Stinchcomb (analyst)
- Box score, Recap

Game information
First quarter
- TAMU – Ainias Smith 2-yard pass from Zach Calzada (Seth Small kick), 11:25. Aggies 7–0. Drive: 4 plays, 22 yards, 1:58.
- TAMU – Isaiah Spiller 48-yard run (Seth Small kick), 7:55. Aggies 14–0. Drive: 5 plays, 89 yards, 1:33.
- TAMU – De'Von Achane 20-yard run (Seth Small kick), 2:43. Aggies 21–0. Drive: 8 plays, 84 yards, 3:13.

Second quarter

- MIZ – Tyler Badie 32-yard run (Harrison Mevis kick), 8:09. Aggies 21–7. Drive: 5 plays, 66 yards, 2:34.
- TAMU – Ainias Smith 11-yard pass from Zach Calzada (Seth Small kick), 4:45. Aggies 28–7. Drive: 7 plays, 75 yards, 3:24.

Third quarter

- MIZ – Dominic Lovett 7-yard run (Harrison Mevis kick), 8:12. Aggies 28–14. Drive: 14 plays, 97 yards, 5:34.
- TAMU – De'Von Achane 1-yard run (Seth Small kick), 2:33. Aggies 35–14. Drive: 12 plays, 75 yards, 5:39.

Fourth quarter

- No scoring plays

Statistics

Statistics	TAMU	MIZ
First downs	29	19
Total yards	431	328
Rushing yards	283	98
Passing yards	148	230
Turnovers	1	2
Time of possession	29:57	30:03

Team	Category	Player	Statistics
Texas A&M	Passing	Zach Calzada	13/25, 148 yards, 2 TD, INT
Texas A&M	Rushing	Isaiah Spiller	20 rushes, 168 yards 1 TD
Texas A&M	Receiving	Ainias Smith	3 receptions, 34 yards 2 TD
Missouri	Passing	Connor Bazelak	29/43, 230 yards, 2 INT
Missouri	Rushing	Tyler Badie	22 rushes 68 yards 1 TD
Missouri	Receiving	Tauskie Dove	5 receptions, 65 yards

=== At Vanderbilt ===
	1	2	3	4	Total
Tigers	10	7	7	13	37
Commodores	7	7	7	7	28

Statistics

Statistics	MIZ	VAN
First downs	23	20
Total yards	502	380
Rushing yards	284	258
Passing yards	218	122
Turnovers	1	1
Time of possession	33:45	26:15

Team	Category	Player	Statistics
Missouri	Passing	Connor Bazelak	22/28, 218 yards, TD, INT
Missouri	Rushing	Tyler Badie	31 carries, 254 yards, 2 TD
Missouri	Receiving	Keke Chism	4 receptions, 95 yards, TD
Vanderbilt	Passing	Mike Wright	14/28, 122 yards, 3 TD, INT
Vanderbilt	Rushing	Mike Wright	14 carries, 152 yards
Vanderbilt	Receiving	Chris Pierce Jr.	4 receptions, 54 yards

=== At No.1 Georgia ===
Game Nine – Missouri Tigers (4–4) at No. 1 Georgia Bulldogs (8–0)

Quarter	1	2	3	4	Total
Missouri	3	0	0	3	6
No. 1 Georgia	7	19	14	3	43

at Sanford Stadium • Athens, Georgia

- Date: Saturday, November 6, 2021
- Game time: 12:00 p.m. EST
- Game weather: Clear • Temperature -
- Game attendance: 92,746
- Referee: -
- TV announcers (ESPN): Joe Tessitore (play-by-play), Greg McElroy (color) and Katie George (sideline)
- ESPN

Game information

First quarter

- (5:50) MIZ – Harrison Mevis 36 Yd Field Goal (Missouri 3–0)
- (0:42) UGA – Arian Smith 35 Yd pass from Stetson Bennett (Jack Podlesny Kick) (Georgia 7–3)

Second quarter

- (14:12) UGA – Grant McKinniss punt blocked by Nolan Smith for a SAFETY (Georgia 9–3)
- (11:37) UGA – Zamir White 1 Yd Run (Jack Podlesny Kick) (Georgia 16–3)
- (5:05) UGA – Jack Podlesny 20 Yd Field Goal (Georgia 19–3)
- (0:18) UGA – James Cook 1 Yd Run (Jack Podlesny Kick) (Georgia 26–3)

Third quarter

- (12:35) UGA - Jermaine Burton 12 Yd pass from Stetson Bennett (Jack Podlesny Kick) (Georgia 33-3)
- (1:15) UGA - Ladd McConkey 7 Yd pass from JT Daniels (Jack Podlesny Kick) (Georgia 40-3)

Fourth quarter

- (7:58) MIZ - Harrison Mevis 42 Yd Field Goal (Georgia 40-6)
- (2:33) UGA - Jack Podlesny 25 Yd Field Goal (Georgia 43-6)

Statistics	MIZ	UGA
First downs	15	25
Plays–yards	67–273	63–505
Rushes–yards	35–121	33–168
Passing yards	152	337
Passing: comp–att–int	20–32–0	20–30–1
Time of possession	31:53	28:07

Team	Category	Player	Statistics
MIZ	Passing	Brady Cook	14-19, 78 yards
MIZ	Rushing	Tyler Macon	11 carries, 42 yards
MIZ	Receiving	Tauskie Dove	4 receptions, 84 yards
Georgia	Passing	Stetson Bennett	13/19, 255 yards, 2 TD
Georgia	Rushing	James Cook	9 carries, 41 yards, 1 TD
Georgia	Receiving	Jermaine Burton	3 receptions, 76 yards, 1 TD

=== vs Florida ===
Florida Gators at Missouri Tigers – Game summary

Quarter	1	2	3	4	OT	Total
Florida	3	3	7	3	7	23
Missouri	3	6	0	7	8	24

at Faurot Field • Columbia, Missouri

- Date: November 20, 2021
- Game time: 4:00 p.m. EST
- Game weather: Temperature: 60 °F (16 °C) • Wind: S at 5 mph (8.0 km/h) • Weather: Sunny
- Game attendance: 47,818
- Referee: James Carter
- TV announcers (SECN): Dave Neal (play-by-play), Deuce McAllister (analyst), Andraya Carter (sideline)
- Boxscore

Game information

First quarter

- Florida – Chris Howard 42-yard field goal, 9:49
- Missouri – Harrison Mevis 39-yard field goal, 2:40

Second quarter

- Florida – Chris Howard 26-yard field goal, 9:35
- Missouri – Harrison Mevis 46-yard field goal, 6:56
- Missouri – Harrison Mevis 31-yard field goal, 1:34

Third quarter

- Florida – Dameon Pierce 2-yard run (Chris Howard kick), 12:52

Fourth quarter

- Missouri – Niko Hea 41-yard pass from Connor Bazelak (Harrison Mevis kick), 11:53
- Florida – Chris Howard 33-yard field goal, 8:30

Overtime

- Florida – Emory Jones 6-yard pass from Trent Whittemore (Chris Howard kick)
- Missouri – Tyler Badie 13-yard run (Connor Bazelak pass to Daniel Parker, Jr.)

Passing leaders

- FLA – Emory Jones – 20/32, 261 yards
- MIZZ – Connor Bazelak – 15/26, 165 yards, 1 touchdown

Rushing leaders

- FLA – Emory Jones – 17 carries, 45 yards
- MIZZ – Tyler Badie – 27 carries, 146 yards, 1 touchdown

Receiving leaders

- FLA – Jacob Copeland – 8 receptions, 102 yards
- MIZZ – Tauskie Dove – 2 receptions, 72 yards

Tackling leaders

- FLA – Ty'Ron Hopper – 12 tackles
- MIZZ – Chad Bailey – 9 tackles

=== At No.23 Arkansas ===
Game Twelve – Missouri Tigers (6–5) at No. 25 Arkansas Razorbacks (7–4)

Quarter	1	2	3	4	Total
Tigers	0	6	3	8	17
No. 25 Razorbacks	3	7	14	10	34

at Donald W. Reynolds Razorback Stadium • Fayetteville, Arkansas

- Date: Friday, November 26, 2021
- Game time: 2:30 p.m. CST
- Game weather: Sunny • Temperature: 54 °F (12 °C) • Wind: NE 12 mph
- Game attendance: 67,320
- Referee: Steve Marlowe
- TV announcers (CBS): Noah Eagle (play-by-play), Aaron Murray and Rick Neuheisel (analysts), Jenny Dell (sideline)
- ESPN

Game information

First quarter

- (10:01) Arkansas – Cam Little 36 yard field goal (Drive: 8 plays, 67 yards, 3:22; Arkansas 3–0)

Second quarter

- (13:27) Missouri – Harrison Mevis 45 yard field goal (Drive: 7 plays, 11 yards, 3:53; Tied 3–3)
- (5:53) Arkansas – Raheim Sanders 1 yard rush, Cam Little kick (Drive: 8 plays, 76 yards, 2:50; Arkansas 10–3)
- (3:02) Missouri – Harrison Mevis 49 yard field goal (Drive: 8 plays, 44 yards, 2:51; Arkansas 10–6)

Third quarter

- (11:13) Arkansas – Trelon Smith 4 yard rush, Cam Little kick (Drive: 3 plays, 61 yards, 1:11; Arkansas 17–6)
- (9:49) Arkansas – Treylon Burks 52 yard pass from KJ Jefferson, Cam Little kick (Drive: 2 plays, 52 yards, 0:16; Arkansas 24–6)
- (2:03) Missouri – Harrison Mevis 41 yard field goal (Drive: 14 plays, 51 yards, 7:45; Arkansas 24–9)

Fourth quarter

- (11:44) Arkansas – Cam Little 23 yard field goal (Drive: 11 plays, 70 yards, 5:19; Arkansas 27–9)
- (9:52) Arkansas – Raheim Sanders 7 yard rush, Cam Little kick (Drive: 4 plays, 47 yards, 1:45; Arkansas 34–9)
- (1:25) Missouri – Tyler Badie 5 yard rush, 2-point pass good (Drive: 11 plays, 58 yards, 4:22; Arkansas 34–17)

Statistics	MIZ	ARK
First downs	19	14
Plays–yards	76–316	53–425
Rushes–yards	50–251	33–163
Passing yards	65	262
Passing: comp–att–int	10–26–1	15–20–0
Time of possession	35:11	24:49

Team	Category	Player	Statistics
Missouri	Passing	Connor Bazelak	10/26, 65 yards, 1 INT
Missouri	Rushing	Tyler Badie	41 carries, 219 yards, 1 TD
Missouri	Receiving	Keke Chism	3 receptions, 37 yards
Arkansas	Passing	KJ Jefferson	15/19, 262 yards, 1 TD
Arkansas	Rushing	KJ Jefferson	6 carries, 58 yards
Arkansas	Receiving	Treylon Burks	7 receptions, 129 yards, 1 TD

=== vs Army (Armed Forces Bowl) ===
Missouri Tigers vs. Army Black Knights (2021 Lockheed Martin Armed Forces Bowl)

Quarter	1	2	3	4	Total
Tigers	10	6	0	6	22
Black Knights	0	7	7	10	24

at Amon G. Carter Stadium, Fort Worth, TX

- Date: December 22, 2021
- Game time: 7:00 p.m. CST
- Game weather: Temperature: 56 °F (13 °C) • Wind: NW 1 mph • Weather: Clear
- Game attendance: 34,888
- Referee: Derek Anderson
- TV announcers (ESPN): Tiffany Greene (play-by-play), Jay Walker (analyst) & Kris Budden (sideline)
- ESPN – Army stuns Missouri in Armed Forces Bowl on last-second FG /// Box Score, Missouri vs. Army (2021 Lockheed Martin Armed Forces Bowl) /// Pregame Notes /// Pregame Notes /// Postgame Notes

Game information

First Quarter

- (11:55) MIZ TD – Brady Cook 30-yard rush, Harrison Mevis kick
  Drive: 7 plays, 72 yards, 3:05; Missouri 7–0
- (00:55) MIZ FG – Harrison Mevis 22-yard field goal
  Drive: 8 plays, 69 yards, 3:27; Missouri 10–0

Second Quarter

- (13:56) ARMY TD – Christian Anderson 22-yard rush, Cole Talley kick
  Drive: 6 plays, 75 yards, 1:59; Missouri 10–7
- (05:59) MIZ FG – Harrison Mevis 25-yard field goal
  Drive: 16 plays, 67 yards, 7:57; Missouri 13–7
- (00:03) MIZ FG – Harrison Mevis 39-yard field goal
  Drive: 11 plays, 64 yards, 3:49; Missouri 16–7

Third Quarter

- (06:35) ARMY TD – Jakobi Buchanan 10-yard rush, Cole Talley kick
  Drive: 17 plays, 75 yards, 8:25; Missouri 16–14

Fourth Quarter

- (10:20) ARMY TD – Brandon Walters 14-yard pass from Tyhier Tyler, Cole Talley kick
  Drive: 13 plays, 56 yards, 6:29; Army 21–16
- (01:11) MIZ TD – Keke Chism 6-yard pass from Brady Cook, Brady Cook pass failed
  Drive: 11 plays, 83 yards, 1:33; Missouri 22–21
- (00:00) ARMY FG – Cole Talley 41-yard field goal
  Drive: 8 plays, 51 yards, 1:11; Army 24–22

Passing

- MIZ – Brady Cook: 27/34, 238 yards, 1 TD
- ARMY – Christian Anderson: 3/4, 60 yards

Rushing

- MIZ – Elijah Young: 13 carries, 75 yards
- ARMY – Jakobi Buchanan: 21 carries, 68 yards, 1 TD

Receiving

- MIZ – Keke Chism: 5 receptions, 64 yards, 1 TD
- ARMY – Tyrell Robinson: 1 reception, 42 yards

Defense

- MIZ – Blaze Alldredge: 14 total tackles (5 solo, 9 assisted), 2.5 tackles for loss
- ARMY – Marquel Broughton: 14 total tackles (6 solo, 8 assisted), 1 forced fumble, 1 pass break-up

Statistics	MIZ	ARMY
First downs	28	21
3rd down efficiency	6–11	5–14
4th down efficiency	0–1	5–5
Plays–yards	71–433	64–306
Rushes–yards	37–195	55–211
Passing yards	238	95
Passing: Comp–Att–Int	27–34–0	6–9–0
Penalties–yards	5–40	4–35
Turnovers	1	0
Time of possession	29:00	31:00

== Coaching staff ==
Name	Position	Seasons at Missouri	Alma mater
Eliah Drinkwitz	Head coach	2	Arkansas Tech (2004)
Charlie Harbison	Associate head coach / defensive backs	2	Gardner–Webb (1982)
Steve Wilks	Defensive coordinator / Safeties	1	Appalachian State (1991)
Erik Link	Special teams coordinator	2	Drake (2003)
Al Davis	Defensive line	1	Arkansas (2012)
Bush Hamdan	Wide receivers / quarterbacks	2	Boise State (2008)
Casey Woods	Tight ends / recruiting coordinator	2	Tennessee (2006)
Aaron Fletcher	Secondary	1	Texas A&M (1999)
Marcus Johnson	Offensive line/run game coordinator/assistant head coach	2	Ole Miss (2004)
Curtis Luper	Running backs	2	Stephen F. Austin (1996)
D. J. Smith	Linebackers	2	Appalachian State (2010)
Andy Lutz	Director of football operations	2	Pacific (1991)
Zac Woodfin	Director of Athletic Performance	2	UAB (2004)

== Players drafted into the NFL ==
Round	Pick	Player	Position	NFL Club
4	118	Akayleb Evans	CB	Minnesota Vikings
5	196	Tyler Badie	RB	Baltimore Ravens
