= Andre Carter II =

American football player (born 2000)

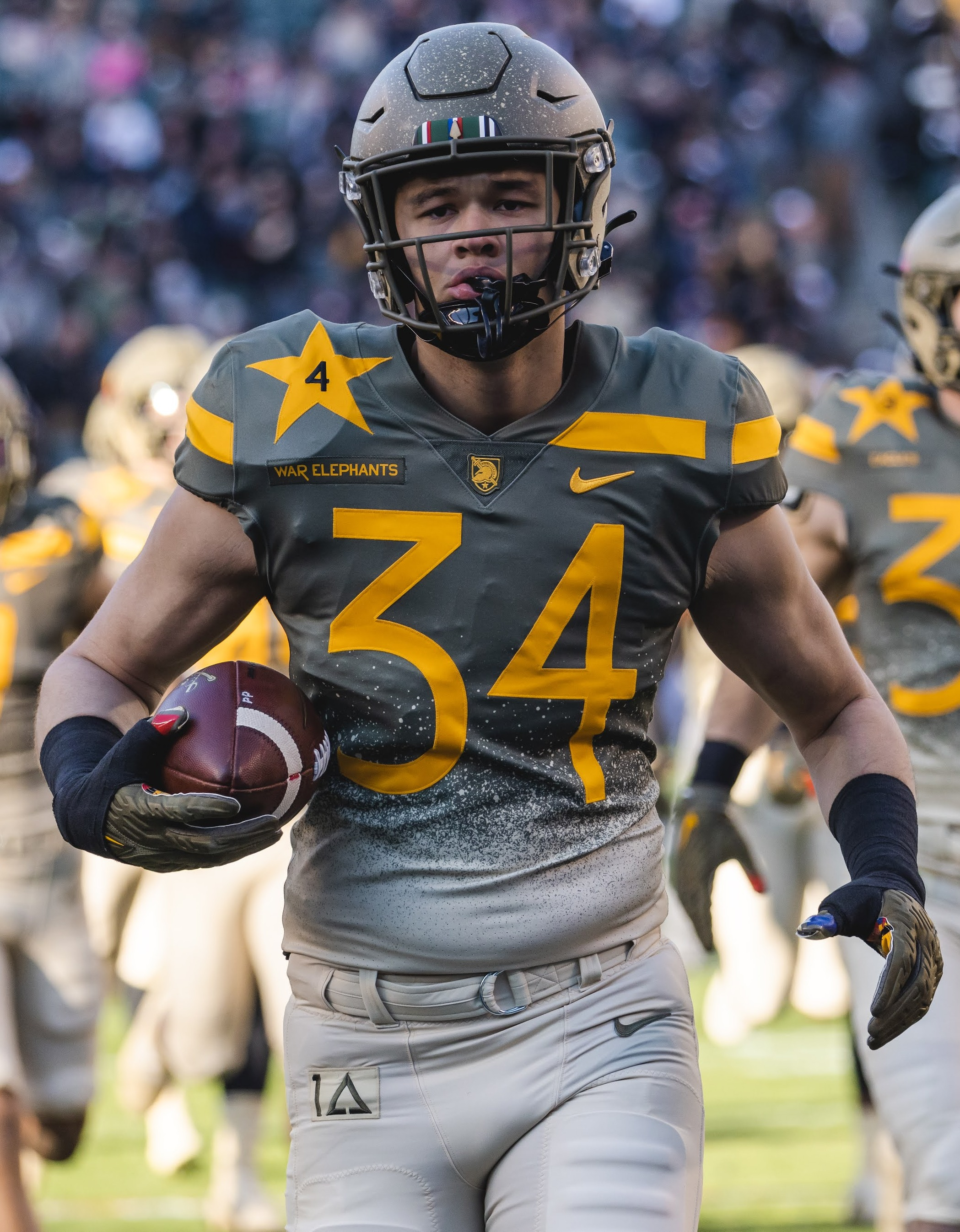
- Carter with the Army Black Knights in 2022

No. 51 – Los Angeles Chargers
- Position: Outside linebacker
- Roster status: Practice squad

Personal information
- Born: June 2, 2000 (age 26); Murrieta, California, U.S.
- Listed height: 6 ft 6 in (1.98 m)
- Listed weight: 256 lb (116 kg)

Career information
- High school: Cheshire (Cheshire, Connecticut)
- College: Army (2019–2022)
- NFL draft: 2023: undrafted

Career history
- Minnesota Vikings (2023–2024); Las Vegas Raiders (2024); Detroit Lions (2025)*; Miami Dolphins (2025); Washington Commanders (2026)*; Los Angeles Chargers (2026–present)
- * Offseason or practice squad member only

Awards and highlights
- Third-team All-American (2021)

Career NFL statistics as of 2025
- Total tackles: 3
- Sacks: 0.5
- Stats at Pro Football Reference

Andre Carter II (born June 2, 2000) is an American professional football outside linebacker for the Los Angeles Chargers of the National Football League (NFL). Carter played college football for the Army Black Knights. He has also played for the Minnesota Vikings, Las Vegas Raiders, Detroit Lions, Miami Dolphins, and Washington Commanders.

== Early life ==
Carter was born on June 2, 2000, in Murrieta, California, and later moved with his family to Missouri City, Texas. After high school, he completed a postgraduate year at Cheshire Academy in Cheshire, Connecticut.

== College career ==
Carter did not play in any of Army's games as a freshman. He played in ten games as a sophomore and had 14 tackles with one sack, one forced fumble, and one interception. As a junior, Carter finished second in the nation with 15.5 sacks and had 44 total tackles, 18.5 tackles for loss, and four forced fumbles.

== Professional career ==
Pre-draft measurables
Height	Weight	Arm length	Hand span	Wingspan	40-yard dash	10-yard split	20-yard split	20-yard shuttle	Three-cone drill	Vertical jump	Broad jump	Bench press
6 ft 6 1/2 in (1.99 m)	256 lb (116 kg)	33 3/8 in (0.85 m)	9 3/8 in (0.24 m)	6 ft 9 in (2.06 m)	4.93 s	1.65 s	2.75 s	4.29 s	6.97 s	30.0 in (0.76 m)	9 ft 1 in (2.77 m)	11 reps
All values from NFL Combine/Pro Day

=== Minnesota Vikings ===
Carter II signed with the Minnesota Vikings as an undrafted free agent on April 29, 2023. On August 29, the Vikings announced that he had made the initial 53-man roster.

Carter was waived by the Vikings on August 27, 2024, and re-signed to the practice squad.

=== Las Vegas Raiders ===
On December 18, 2024, Carter was signed by the Las Vegas Raiders off of the Vikings' practice squad.

On August 25, 2025, Carter was waived by the Raiders.

=== Detroit Lions ===
On August 28, 2025, Carter was signed to the Detroit Lions' practice squad.

=== Miami Dolphins ===
On November 5, 2025, Carter was signed by the Miami Dolphins off the Lions' practice squad. He was waived by the Dolphins on December 15, and re-signed to the practice squad.

=== Washington Commanders ===
On January 12, 2026, Carter signed a futures contract with the Washington Commanders. He was released by the Commanders at the start of training camp on July 29.

=== Los Angeles Chargers ===
On August 10, 2026, Carter signed with the Los Angeles Chargers. Carter was waived by Los Angeles as a part of final roster cuts on August 30; he was re-signed to the team's practice squad the following day.
