= Brady Cook =

American football player (born 2001)

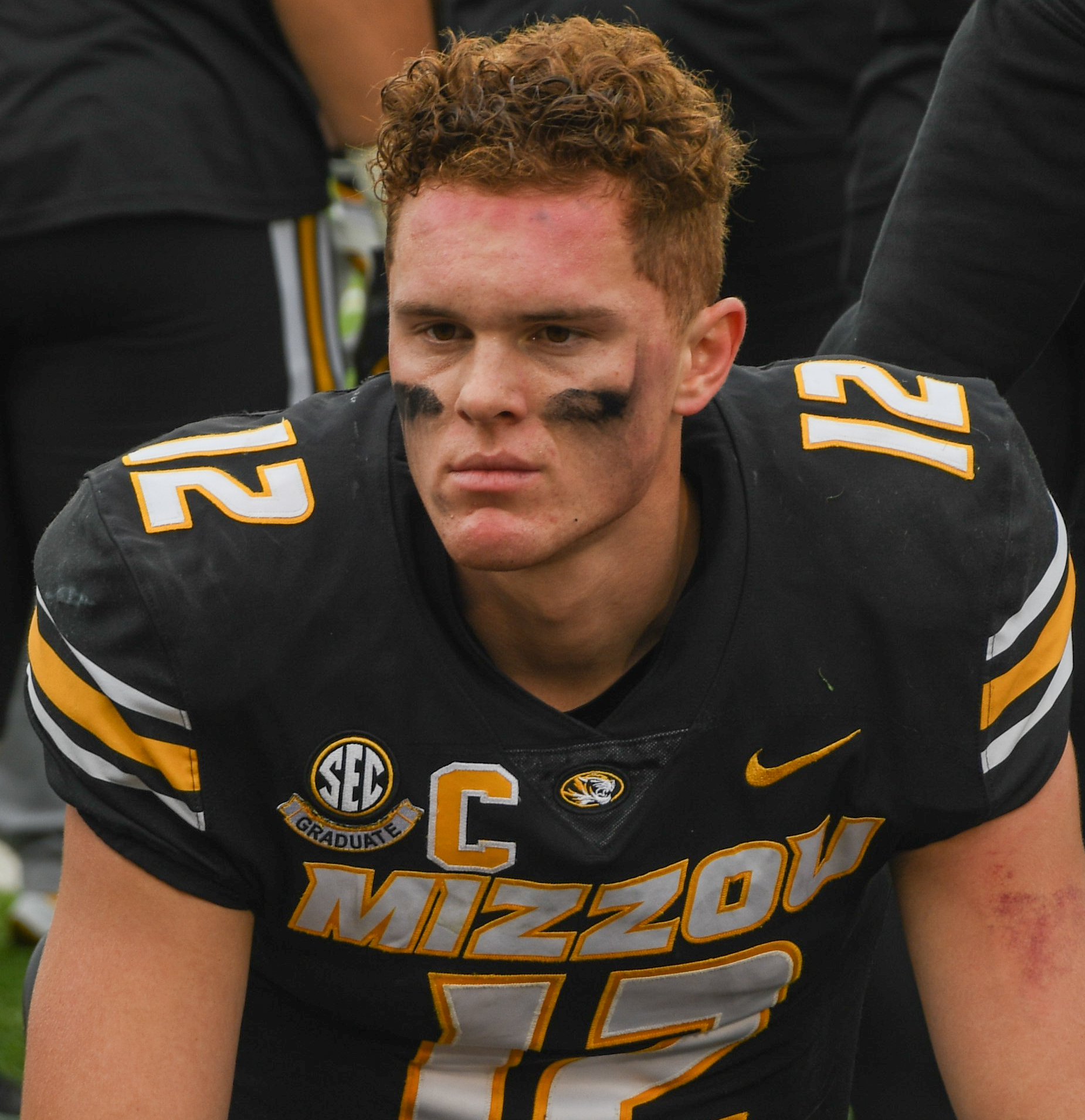
- Cook with the Missouri Tigers in 2023

No. 15 – Miami Dolphins
- Position: Quarterback
- Roster status: Active

Personal information
- Born: October 12, 2001 (age 25); St. Louis, Missouri, U.S.
- Listed height: 6 ft 2 in (1.88 m)
- Listed weight: 215 lb (98 kg)

Career information
- High school: Chaminade College Prep (Creve Coeur, Missouri)
- College: Missouri (2020–2024)
- NFL draft: 2025: undrafted

Career history
- New York Jets (2025); Miami Dolphins (2026–present)

Career NFL statistics as of 2025
- Passing attempts: 153
- Passing completions: 88
- Completion percentage: 57.5%
- TD–INT: 2–7
- Passing yards: 739
- Passer rating: 55.4
- Rushing yards: 49
- Stats at Pro Football Reference

Brady Cook (born October 12, 2001) is an American professional football quarterback for the Miami Dolphins of the National Football League (NFL). He played college football for the Missouri Tigers.

== Early life ==
Cook attended Chaminade College Preparatory School in Creve Coeur, Missouri. As a senior, Cook threw for 33 touchdowns and 3,194 yards. Cook was rated as a three-star recruit and the number one quarterback in Missouri and committed to play college football at the University of Missouri.

== College career ==
In 2020, Cook redshirted and appeared in three games. Cook recorded 72 yards passing and one touchdown. Cook entered the 2021 season as the backup to Connor Bazelak. After Bazelak struggled and eventually got injured, Cook received his first major playing time against Georgia, in which Cook threw for 78 yards in a 43–6 loss. Cook made his first career start against Army in the 2021 Armed Forces Bowl, in which Cook tallied 238 passing yards and a touchdown while rushing for 53 yards and a touchdown. He was named the game's offensive MVP.

=== 2022 ===
Entering the 2022 season, Cook was named the starting quarterback. Cook led Missouri to a 2–2 start including a three touchdown performance against Abilene Christian. Cook then led Missouri to a 22–12 lead over No. 1 Georgia in the fourth quarter. Despite this, Georgia scored 14 unanswered points to win 26–22. Cook finished the game with 192 yards and a touchdown. Cook finished the season throwing for 2,739 yards, 14 touchdowns, and seven interceptions, while also rushing for 585 yards and six touchdowns, leading Missouri to the 2022 Gasparilla Bowl.

=== 2023 ===
Entering the 2023 season, Cook competed with Jake Garcia and Sam Horn for Missouri's starting quarterback job, with Cook eventually being named the starter. In week three against No. 15 Kansas State, he threw for 356 yards and contributed three total touchdowns in a 30–27 upset victory. Against Vanderbilt, Cook threw for a then career-high, 395 yards and four touchdowns, in a 38–21 rout. During the game, he set an SEC record for most consecutive passes without an interception, overtaking the previous record from former Kentucky quarterback Andre' Woodson. Cook led Missouri to a 5–0 record before a matchup with No. 23 LSU, where he recorded a career-high 411 passing yards and threw for two touchdowns. Despite his efforts, LSU was victorious 49–39. The following week, Cook helped Missouri bounce back with a 38–21 victory over No. 24 Kentucky, contributing two total touchdowns. Against South Carolina, he threw for 198 yards and totaled two touchdowns, leading Missouri to a 7–1 record, the team's best record through eight games since 2013.

During the 2023 regular season, Cook led Missouri to a 10–2 record and an appearance in the 2023 Cotton Bowl Classic, finishing the year with 20 passing touchdowns, 3,189 passing yards, and eight rushing touchdowns. In the Cotton Bowl Classic, Cook threw for 128 yards and a touchdown, leading Missouri to a 14–3 victory over Ohio State. As a result of his performance, he was named the game's offensive MVP. Following the game, he announced that he would return to Missouri the following season after finishing the 2023 season throwing for 3,317 yards, rushing for 319 yards, and totaling 29 total touchdowns.

=== 2024 ===
In the season opener against Murray State, Cook threw for 218 yards and totaled two touchdowns, one rushing and one passing, in a 51–0 rout. Against Auburn, he suffered an injury on the opening drive of the game and was taken to the hospital to have an MRI exam on his ankle. Unexpected to return to the game, Cook came back into the game with Missouri trailing 17–6 near the end of the third quarter. He then led the Tigers to two touchdown drives, resulting in a 21–17 Missouri victory. Cook finished the game with 194 yards passing. The following week, he gained the start against No. 15 Alabama, despite not being able to practice due to the ankle injury he sustained against Auburn. Cook exited the game after sustaining a wrist injury, finishing the game with 30 passing yards. Dealing with the wrist and ankle injuries, he was sidelined against Oklahoma, marking the end of 35 consecutive starts for Cook. Considered doubtful to play against No. 21 South Carolina, he returned as the starting quarterback after a one-game absence. In the 2024 Music City Bowl, Cook's final collegiate game, against Iowa, he completed 18 of 32 passes for 287 yards and two touchdowns while also rushing for 54 yards, leading Missouri to a 27–24 victory and being named the game's MVP.

== Professional career ==
Pre-draft measurables
| Height | Weight | Arm length | Hand span | Wingspan | 40-yard dash | 10-yard split | 20-yard split | 20-yard shuttle | Three-cone drill | Vertical jump | Broad jump |
|---|---|---|---|---|---|---|---|---|---|---|---|
| 6 ft 2 1/8 in (1.88 m) | 214 lb (97 kg) | 32 1/2 in (0.83 m) | 9 1/4 in (0.23 m) | 6 ft 5 5/8 in (1.97 m) | 4.59 s | 1.53 s | 2.67 s | 4.17 s | 7.01 s | 37.0 in (0.94 m) | 10 ft 8 in (3.25 m) |
All values from NFL Combine

=== New York Jets ===
Cook signed with the New York Jets as an undrafted free agent on May 9, 2025. He was waived on August 26 as part of final roster cuts and re-signed to the practice squad the next day. On December 6, Cook was signed to the active roster after Justin Fields was made inactive for the team's Week 14 matchup against the Miami Dolphins. Cook later threw his first touchdown pass to Adonai Mitchell against the Jacksonville Jaguars on December 14, but threw three interceptions in the eventual 48–20 loss.

On August 30, 2026, Cook was waived by the Jets as a part of final roster cuts.

=== Miami Dolphins ===
On August 31, 2026, Cook was claimed off waivers by the Miami Dolphins. On October 10, he was waived and re-signed to the practice squad. On November 17, Cook was signed to the active roster.

== Career statistics ==
=== NFL ===
| Year | Team | Games | | | Passing | | | | | | | | | Rushing | | | | | Sacks | | Fumbles | |
| Year | Team | GP | GS | Record | Cmp | Att | Pct | Yds | Y/A | Lng | TD | Int | Rtg | Att | Yds | Avg | Lng | TD | Sck | SckY | Fum | Lost |
|---|---|---|---|---|---|---|---|---|---|---|---|---|---|---|---|---|---|---|---|---|---|---|
| 2025 | NYJ | 5 | 4 | 0–4 | 88 | 153 | 57.5 | 739 | 4.8 | 26 | 2 | 7 | 55.4 | 13 | 49 | 3.8 | 12 | 0 | 19 | 125 | 3 | 1 |
| Career | | 5 | 4 | 0–4 | 88 | 153 | 57.5 | 739 | 4.8 | 26 | 2 | 7 | 55.4 | 13 | 49 | 3.8 | 12 | 0 | 19 | 125 | 3 | 1 |

=== College ===
| Season | Team | Games | | | Passing | | | | | | | | Rushing | | | |
| Season | Team | GP | GS | Record | Comp | Att | Pct | Yards | Avg | TD | Int | Rate | Att | Yards | Avg | TD |
|---|---|---|---|---|---|---|---|---|---|---|---|---|---|---|---|---|
| 2020 | Missouri | 3 | 0 | 0–0 | 6 | 7 | 85.7 | 72 | 10.3 | 1 | 0 | 219.3 | 1 | -10 | -10.0 | 0 |
| 2021 | Missouri | 6 | 1 | 0–1 | 46 | 58 | 79.3 | 345 | 5.9 | 2 | 0 | 140.7 | 22 | 92 | 4.2 | 1 |
| 2022 | Missouri | 13 | 13 | 6–7 | 248 | 383 | 64.8 | 2,739 | 7.2 | 14 | 7 | 133.2 | 139 | 585 | 4.2 | 6 |
| 2023 | Missouri | 13 | 13 | 11–2 | 244 | 369 | 66.1 | 3,317 | 9.0 | 21 | 6 | 157.2 | 113 | 319 | 2.8 | 8 |
| 2024 | Missouri | 12 | 12 | 9–3 | 201 | 321 | 62.6 | 2,535 | 7.9 | 11 | 2 | 139.0 | 87 | 223 | 2.6 | 5 |
| Career | | 47 | 39 | 26−13 | 745 | 1,138 | 65.5 | 9,008 | 7.9 | 49 | 15 | 143.5 | 362 | 1,209 | 3.3 | 20 |

== Personal life ==
Cook is the son of Jim and Amy Cook, and he grew up a fan of the Missouri Tigers. Cook was named to the 2021 SEC Academic Honor Roll.

In 2023, Cook was named the SEC Scholar Athlete of the Year. He received the honor again in 2024, joining Tim Tebow and Barrett Jones as the only players to win the award in back-to-back years.
