= 2026 Missouri Tigers football team =

American college football season

2026 Missouri Tigers football
- Conference: Southeastern Conference

Ranking
- Coaches: No. 23
- AP: No. 24
- Record: 7–4 (4–4 SEC)
- Head coach: Eliah Drinkwitz (7th season)
- Offensive coordinator: Chip Lindsey (1st season)
- Offensive scheme: Spread
- Defensive coordinator: Corey Batoon (3rd season)
- Base defense: 4–2–5
- Home stadium: Faurot Field

2026 Southeastern Conference football standings
	Conf.			Overall
Team	W		L	W		L
No. 1 Georgia y	8	–	1	10	–	1
No. 5 Texas	6	–	2	9	–	2
No. 9 Tennessee	6	–	2	9	–	2
No. 3 Alabama	6	–	2	9	–	2
No. 22 Oklahoma	5	–	3	7	–	4
No. 24 Florida	5	–	4	7	–	4
No. 16 Kentucky	5	–	4	7	–	4
No. 25 Ole Miss	4	–	4	7	–	4
Auburn	4	–	4	7	–	4
Missouri	4	–	4	7	–	4
No. 21 South Carolina	4	–	5	6	–	5
LSU	3	–	5	6	–	5
Mississippi State	2	–	6	5	–	6
Arkansas	2	–	6	4	–	7
Texas A&M	1	–	7	4	–	7
Vanderbilt	1	–	7	4	–	7
Championship: Georgia vs TBD
^ – College Football Playoff participant; $ – Conference champion; y – Championship game participant; As of November 22, 2026; Rankings from CFP rankings

The 2026 Missouri Tigers football team represents the University of Missouri in the Southeastern Conference (SEC) during the 2026 NCAA Division I FBS football season. The Tigers are led by Eliah Drinkwitz in his seventh season as their head coach. The Tigers play their home games at Faurot Field located in Columbia, Missouri, which completed a $250 million addition to the north end zone prior to the season, making its official capacity 63,609. Missouri is coming off an 8–5 season in 2025, ending with a loss to the Virginia Cavaliers in the Gator Bowl.

On December 12, 2025, offensive coordinator Kirby Moore accepted the head coach position at Washington State. Former Michigan OC Chip Lindsey was brought in to replace Moore. Drinkwitz then brought in former Clemson OC Garrett Riley to be his quarterbacks coach. Erik Link was not brought back as special teams coordinator, with John Papuchis replacing him. On May 10, 2026 All-American running back Ahmad Hardy sustained a gunshot wound to the thigh while in Mississippi, with his return to play unknown.

Drinkwitz was active in the portal once again, bringing in a total of 26 players. On the offensive side of the ball, Drinkwitz brought in former Ole Miss QB Austin Simmons to compete with Matt Zollers for the starting QB position as well as wide receivers Cayden Lee (Ole Miss) and Caleb Goodie Sr. (Cincinnati). Notable defensive transfers included Auburn LB Robert Woodyard Jr., defensive backs Jahlil Florence (Oregon), Sione Laulea (Oreogn), and Chris Graves Jr. (Ole Miss), and safeties JaDon Blair (Notre Dame) and Kensley Louidor-Faustin (Auburn).

At the end of spring football camp, Drinkwitz named Austin Simmons as QB1, beating out Matt Zollers. For SEC Media Days in Tampa, Florida at the end of July, Drinkwitz brought OL Cayden Green, RB Jamal Roberts, and LB Nicholas Rodriguez. Missouri was picked to finish 10th in the SEC by media covering SEC Media Days. RB Ahmad Hardy and OL Cayden Green were voted First Team pre-season All-SEC. Ahmad Hardy was named AP First Team pre-season All-American, with Cayden Green named Second Team pre-season All-American.

Missouri was ranked Number 25 in both the pre-season Coaches and AP Poll.

== Offseason ==
=== Departures ===
2026 Missouri offseason departures
Name	Position	Notes
Toriano Pride Jr.	CB	Declared for 2026 NFL draft
Kevin Coleman Jr.	WR	Declared for 2026 NFL draft
Josiah Trotter	LB	Declared for 2026 NFL draft
Chris McClellan	DT	Declared for 2026 NFL draft
Zion Young	DE	Declared for 2026 NFL draft
Keagen Trost	OL	Declared for 2026 NFL draft
Khalil Jacobs	LB	Graduated
Stephen Hall	CB	Out of eligibility
Vince Brown II	TE	Out of eligibility
Tommy Lock	QB	Out of eligibility
Dreyden Norwood	CB	Out of eligibility
Daylan Carnell	S	Out of eligibility
Triston Newsom	LB	Out of eligibility
Connor Weselman	P	Out of eligibility
Connor Tollison	OL	Out of eligibility
Henry McDermott	OL	Out of eligibility
Logan Muckey	WR	Out of eligibility
Bralen Henderson	DT	Out of eligibility
Jalen Catalon	S	Medically retired
Sam Horn	QB	Stepped down
Damon Wilson II	Edge	Transferred to Miami
Beau Pribula	QB	Transferred to Virginia
Marquis Johnson	WR	Transferred to Mississippi State
Joshua Manning	WR	Transferred to Kansas State
Marquise Davis	RB	Transferred to Louisville
Javion Hilson	Edge	Transferred to Virginia Tech
Henry Fenuku	OL	Transferred to North Texas
Daniel Blood	WR	Transferred to Washington State
Johnny Williams IV	OT	Transferred to North Texas
Nate Johnson	Edge	Transferred to Auburn
Marvin Burks Jr.	S	Transferred to Wisconsin
Robert Meyer	K	Transferred to UC Davis
James Madison II	WR	Transferred to UTSA
Brendon Haygood	RB	Transferred to North Texas
Mose Phillips III	S	Transferred to Oklahoma State
Tavorus Jones	RB	Transferred to UTEP
Caleb Flagg	S	Transferred to UCF
Shamar McNeil	CB	Transferred to Akron
Mark Manfred III	CB	Transferred to Kentucky
Jaylen Early	OL	Transferred to Texas State
Justin Bodford	DT	Transferred to Middle Tennessee
Keiton Jones	OL	Transferred to Kansas State
Jayven Richardson	OL	Transferred to Colorado
Brandon Solis	OL	Transferred to Kansas
Dakotah Terrell	TE	Transferred to Arkansas–Fort Smith Lions basketball team
Ryder Goodwin	K	Transferred to Bethune–Cookman

=== Incoming transfers ===
There are several new names this season:

Name	Position	Eligibility Remaining	Previous School
Austin Simmons	QB	2 years	Ole Miss
Jahlil Florence	CB	2 years	Oregon
Robert Woodyard Jr.	LB	2 years	Auburn
Caleb Goodie	WR	1 year	Cincinnati
JaDon Blair	S	4 years	Notre Dame
Kensley Louidor-Faustin	S	2 years	Auburn
Josh Atkins	OT	1 year	Arizona State
Luke Work	OT	2 years	Mississippi State
Xai'Shaun Edwards	RB	3 years	Houston Christian
Naeshaun Montgomery	WR	4 years	Florida
Jaden Jones	DE	2 years	Florida State
Donta Simpson	DL	3 years	Miami
Elijah Dotson	DB	3 years	Michigan
Nick Evers	QB	1 year	UConn
Brunno Reus	K/P	4 years	Florida State
Kenric Lanier II	WR	2 years	Minnesota
Sione Laulea	CB	1 year	Oregon
Will Kemna	OT	4 years	Kansas State
Colin Sorensen	OT	2 years	Charleston Southern
Malae Fonoti	RB	3 years	Montana
Zack Owens	OL	2 years	Mississippi State
CJ May	Edge	4 years	Louisville
Chris Graves Jr.	CB	1 year	Ole Miss
Malik Bryant	Edge	2 years	Miami
Cayden Lee	WR	1 year	Ole Miss
Kamauryn Morgan	EDGE	3 years	Baylor
Bobby Washington Jr.	LB	2 years	Miami
Mark Shenouda	P	2 years	Tennessee State
Cavan Tuley	DE	2 years	Houston
Mark Hensley	DT	2 years	Northern Illinois

== Schedule ==
Date	Time	Opponent	Rank	Site	TV	Result	Attendance
September 3	7:00 p.m.	Arkansas–Pine Bluff*	No. 25	Faurot Field; Columbia, MO	SECN	W 54–14	63,609
September 11	7:00 p.m.	at Kansas*	No. 23	David Booth Kansas Memorial Stadium; Lawrence, KS (Border War)	FOX	W 38–21	32,000
September 19	6:00 p.m.	Troy*	No. 20	Faurot Field; Columbia, MO	SECN+	W 27–17	63,609
September 26	6:45 p.m.	at No. 24 Mississippi State	No. 19	Davis Wade Stadium; Starkville, MS	SECN	L 24–31	60,417
October 3	2:30 p.m.	No. 8 Florida^{†}	No. 25	Faurot Field; Columbia, MO	ABC	W 45–17	63,609
October 10	11:00 a.m.	Texas A&M	No. 14	Faurot Field; Columbia, MO	ABC	W 27–6	63,609
October 17	2:30 p.m.	at No. 9 Ole Miss	No. 13	Vaught–Hemingway Stadium; Oxford, MS	SECN	L 3–31	67,510
October 31	6:45 p.m.	at Arkansas	No. 23	Donald W. Reynolds Razorback Stadium; Fayetteville, AR (Battle Line Rivalry)	SECN	W 34–10	65,117
November 7	11:00 a.m.	No. 7 Texas	No. 18	Faurot Field; Columbia, MO	ESPN	L 20–34	63,609
November 14	2:30 p.m.	at No. 1 Georgia	No. 22	Sanford Stadium; Athens, GA	ABC	L 21–48	93,033
November 21	6:30 p.m.	No. 16 Kentucky		Faurot Field; Columbia, MO	SECN	W 28–14	63,609
November 28	3:15 p.m.	Oklahoma		Faurot Field; Columbia, MO (rivalry)	SECN		
*Non-conference game; ^{†}Homecoming; Rankings from AP Poll (and CFP Rankings, after November 3) - Released prior to game; All times are in Central time

== Rankings ==
Ranking movements Legend: ██ Increase in ranking ██ Decrease in ranking — = Not ranked RV = Received votes
	Week															
Poll	Pre	1	2	3	4	5	6	7	8	9	10	11	12	13	14	Final
AP	25	23	20	19	25	14	13	22	23	19	RV	RV	24			
Coaches	25	23	22	21	25	16	13	21	23	19	RV	RV	23			
CFP	Not released									18	22	—				Not released

== Game summaries ==
=== vs. Arkansas–Pine Bluff (FCS) ===
Uniform Combination
Helmet (Oval Tiger)	Jersey	Pants

Arkansas–Pine Bluff Golden Lions (FCS) (1–0) at No. 25 Missouri Tigers (0–0) – Game summary

Quarter	1	2	3	4	Total
Golden Lions (FCS)	0	0	7	7	14
No. 25 Tigers	14	26	0	14	54

at Faurot Field • Columbia, Missouri

- Date: September 3
- Game time: 7:00 p.m. CDT
- Game weather: Sunny • Temperature: 90 °F (32 °C) • Wind: SE at 3 miles per hour (4.8 km/h)
- Game attendance: 63,609
- Referee: Daniel Gautreaux
- TV announcers (SECN): Chuckie Kempf, Dustin Fox, and Marilyn Payne

Game information

First quarter

- (9:38) MIZ: Shaun Terry II 25-yard pass from Austin Simmons (Blake Craig kick) (Drive: 11 plays, 70 yards, 5:22; Missouri 7–0)
- (4:16) MIZ: Donovan Olugbode 14-yard pass from Austin Simmons (Blake Craig kick) (Drive: 9 plays, 49 yards, 4:10; Missouri 14–0)

Second quarter

- (12:56) MIZ: Jamal Roberts 1 yard run (Blake Craig kick) (Drive: 10 plays, 57 yards, 4:59; Missouri 21–0)
- (5:52) Team Safety Missouri 23–0
- (5:44) MIZ: Donovan Olugbode 35-yard pass from Austin Simmons (Blake Craig kick) (Drive: 1 play, 35 yards, 0:08; Missouri 30–0)
- (4:01) MIZ: Cayden Lee 47-yard pass from Austin Simmons (Blake Craig kick) (Drive: 2 plays, 57 yards, 0:27; Missouri 37–0)
- (0:00) MIZ: Blake Craig 32 yard field goal (Drive: 9 plays, 66 yards, 1:34; Missouri 40–0)

Third quarter

- (2:31) UAPB: Za'Marion Webber 27 yard run (Trey Glymph kick) (Drive: 7 plays, 80 yards, 3:09; Missouri 40–7)

Fourth quarter

- (10:00) MIZ: Matt Zollers 5 yard run (Blake Craig kick) (Drive: 5 plays, 44 yards, 2:06; Missouri 47–7)
- (6:13) UAPB: David Brewer IV 16 yard pass from Jack Schierholz (Trey Glymph kick) (Drive: 7 plays, 75 yards, 3:47; Missouri 47–14)
- (3:49) MIZ: Preston Hatfield 9 yard run (Blake Craig kick) (Drive: 6 plays, 50 yards, 2:23; Missouri 54–14)

Statistics	UAPB	MIZ
First downs	13	33
Plays–yards	53–198	78–562
Rushes–yards	29–89	45–205
Passing yards	109	357
Passing: comp–att–int	11–24–0	26–33–0
Turnovers	0	1
Time of possession	26:02	33:58

Team	Category	Player	Statistics
UAPB	Passing	Jack Schierholz	4/10, 67 yards, TD
UAPB	Rushing	Za'Marion Webber	7 carries, 56 yards, TD
UAPB	Receiving	David Brewer IV	2 receptions, 29 yards, TD
Missouri	Passing	Austin Simmons	17/19, 252 yards, 4 TD
Missouri	Rushing	Jamal Roberts	13 carries, 47 yards, TD
Missouri	Receiving	Donovan Olugbode	8 receptions, 116 yards, 2 TD

=== at Kansas (Border War) ===
Uniform Combination
Helmet (Oval Tiger)	Jersey	Pants

No. 23 Missouri Tigers (1–0) at Kansas Jayhawks (1–0) – Game summary

Quarter	1	2	3	4	Total
No. 23 Tigers	0	14	14	10	38
Jayhawks	0	14	7	0	21

at David Booth Kansas Memorial Stadium • Lawrence, Kansas

- Date: September 11
- Game time: 7:00 p.m. CDT
- Game weather: Sunny • Temperature: 82 °F (28 °C) • Wind: SE 5 mph
- Game attendance: 32,000
- Referee: Jason Autrey
- TV announcers (Fox): Tim Brando, Devin Gardner, and Josh Sims

Game information

First quarter

- No scoring plays.

Second quarter

- (7:16) KU: Austin Alexander 88-yard return of blocked field goal (Martin Connington kick) (Drive: 11 plays, 55 yards, 4:56; Kansas 7–0)
- (5:22) MIZ: Jamal Roberts 64-yard run (Blake Craig kick) (Drive: 4 plays, 75 yards, 1:54; Tied 7–7)
- (1:48) KU: Nik McMillan 20-yard pass from Isaiah Marshall (Martin Connington kick) (Drive: 10 plays, 75 yards, 3:34; Kansas 14–7)
- (0:30) MIZ: Cayden Lee 27-yard pass from Austin Simmons (Blake Craig kick) (Drive: 7 plays, 75 yards, 1:18; Tied 14–14)

Third quarter

- (11:40) MIZ: Donovan Olugbobe 8-yard pass from Austin Simmons (Blake Craig kick) (Drive: 5 plays, 34 yards, 2:05; Missouri 21–14)
- (10:52) MIZ: Xai'Shaun Edwards 10-yard run (Blake Craig kick) (Drive: 2 plays, 12 yards, 0:36; Missouri 28–14)
- (2:07) KU: Nahzae Cox 10-yard pass from Isiah Marshall (Martin Connington kick) (Drive: 11 plays, 83 yards, 5:38; Missouri 28–21)

Fourth quarter

- (11:46) MIZ: Blake Craig 32-yard field goal (Drive: 10 plays, 61 yards, 5:21; Missouri 31–14)
- (2:02) MIZ: Brett Norfleet 13-yard pass from Austin Simmons (Blake Craig kick) (Drive: 4 plays, 14 yards, 1:22; Missouri 38–21)

Statistics	MIZ	KU
First downs	21	18
Plays–yards	71–469	67–255
Rushes–yards	41–177	36–81
Passing yards	292	174
Passing: comp–att–int	19–30–0	14–31–2
Turnovers	1	3
Time of possession	31:21	28:39

Team	Category	Player	Statistics
Missouri	Passing	Austin Simmons	19/29, 292 yards, 3 TD
Missouri	Rushing	Jamal Roberts	28 carries, 125 yards, TD
Missouri	Receiving	Donovan Olugbode	6 receptions, 121 yards, TD
Kansas	Passing	Isaiah Marshall	13/30, 168 yards, 2 TD, 2 INT
Kansas	Rushing	Dylan Edwards	6 carries, 39 yards
Kansas	Receiving	Nik McMillan	2 receptions, 52 yards, TD

=== vs. Troy ===
Uniform Combination (100th Anniversary of Memorial Stadium Uniforms)
Helmet (Block M)	Jersey	Pants

Troy Trojans (2–0) at No. 20 Missouri Tigers (2–0) – Game summary

Quarter	1	2	3	4	Total
Trojans	10	7	0	0	17
No. 20 Tigers	0	24	0	3	27

at Faurot Field • Columbia, Missouri

- Date: September 19
- Game time: 6:00 p.m. CDT
- Game weather: Sunny • Temperature: 91 °F (33 °C) • Wind: SW 5 mph
- Game attendance: 63,609
- Referee: Tim Barker
- TV announcers (SECN+): Kevin Fitzgerald (play-by-play) and Charles Arbuckle (analyst)

Game information

First quarter

- (14:15) TROY: TK Keyes 76-yard pass from Goose Crowder (Ethan Head kick) (Drive: 2 plays, 75 yards, 0:45; Troy 7–0)
- (0:50) TROY: Ethan Head 27-yard field goal (Drive: 19 plays, 81 yards, 10:32; Troy 10–0)

Second quarter

- (11:18) MIZ: Blake Craig 35-yard field goal (Drive: 5 plays, 18 yards, 1:18; Troy 10–3)
- (9:39) MIZ: DaMarion Fowlkes 68-yard punt return (Blake Craig kick) (Drive: 3 plays, -5 yards, 1:39; Tied 10–10)
- (2:03) MIZ: Donovan Olugbode 12-yard pass from Austin Simmons (Blake Craig kick) (Drive: 3 plays, 18 yards, 1:03; Missouri 17–10)
- (1:44) MIZ: Jamal Roberts 13-yard run (Blake Craig kick) (Drive: 1 play, 13 yards, 0:06; Missouri 24–10)
- (0:06) TROY: Howard Kinchen 55-yard pass from Goose Crowder (Ethan Head kick) (Drive: 6 plays, 75 yards, 1:38; Missouri 24–17)

Fourth quarter

- (7:18) MIZ: Blake Craig 36-yard field goal (Drive: 7 plays, 51 yards, 3:21; Missouri 27–17)

Statistics	TROY	MIZ
First downs	18	13
Plays–yards	72-323	47-230
Rushes–yards	40-93	28-139
Passing yards	230	91
Passing: comp–att–int	18-32-1	10-19-0
Time of possession	37:23	22:37

Team	Category	Player	Statistics
Troy	Passing	Goose Crowder	18/32, 230 yards, 2 TDs, INT
Troy	Rushing	Gavin Griffin	17 carries, 56 yards
Troy	Receiving	TK Keyes	2 receptions, 83 yards, TD
Missouri	Passing	Austin Simmons	10/19, 91 yards, TD
Missouri	Rushing	Jamal Roberts	22 carries, 128 yards, TD
Missouri	Receiving	Donovan Olugbode	3 receptions, 31 yards, TD

=== at No. 24 Mississippi State ===
Uniform Combination
Helmet (Oval Tiger)	Jersey	Pants

No. 19 Missouri Tigers (3–0) at No. 24 Mississippi State Bulldogs (3–0) – Game summary

Quarter	1	2	3	4	Total
No. 19 Tigers	0	10	14	0	24
No. 24 Bulldogs	14	0	3	14	31

at Davis Wade Stadium • Starkville, Mississippi

- Date: September 26
- Game time: 6:45 p.m. CDT
- Game weather: Clear • Temperature: 77 °F (25 °C) • Wind: NE 3 mph (4.8 km/h)
- Game attendance: 60,417
- Referee: James Carter
- TV announcers (SECN): Matt Schumacker, Aaron Murray, and Taylor Davis

Statistics	MIZ	MSST
First downs	23	27
Plays–yards	75–414	78–499
Rushes–yards	35–119	40–139
Passing yards	295	360
Passing: comp–att–int	23–40–0	27–38–1
Time of possession	31:36	28:24

Team	Category	Player	Statistics
Missouri	Passing	Austin Simmons	23/39, 295 yards, 3 TD
Missouri	Rushing	Jamal Roberts	26 carries, 95 yards
Missouri	Receiving	Cayden Lee	11 receptions, 156 yards, 2 TD
Mississippi State	Passing	Kamario Taylor	27/38, 360 yards, 3 TD, 1 INT
Mississippi State	Rushing	Fluff Bothwell	25 carries, 122 yards, 1 TD
Mississippi State	Receiving	Anthony Evans III	8 receptions, 114 yards

=== vs. No. 8 Florida ===
Uniform Combination
Helmet (Block M)	Jersey	Pants

No. 8 Florida Gators (4–0) at No. 25 Missouri Tigers (3–1) – Game summary

Quarter	1	2	3	4	Total
No. 8 Gators	3	7	0	7	17
No. 25 Tigers	3	17	10	15	45

at Faurot Field • Columbia, Missouri

- Date: October 3
- Game time: 2:30 pm CDT
- Game weather: Sunny • Temperature: 74 °F (23 °C) • Wind: SE at 6 miles per hour (9.7 km/h)
- Game attendance: 63,609
- Referee: Ted Pitts
- TV announcers (ABC): Joe Tessitore, Jesse Palmer, and Kris Budden

Game information

First quarter

- FLA – Patrick Durkin 20-yard field goal, 8:06. Gators 3–0. Drive: 15 plays, 73 yards, 6:54.
- MIZ – Blake Craig 32-yard field goal, 3:15. Gators 3–3 Tigers. Drive: 12 plays, 62 yards, 4:51.

Second quarter

- MIZ – Donovan Olugbode 47-yard pass from Austin Simmons (Blake Craig kick), 10:06. Tigers 10–3. Drive: 6 plays, 68 yards, 2:55.
- FLA – Dallas Wilson 12-yard pass from Aaron Philo (Patrick Durkin kick), 4:26. Gators 10–10 Tigers. Drive: 7 plays, 68 yards, 3:23.
- MIZ – Caleb Goodie Sr. 31-yard pass from Austin Simmons (Blake Craig kick), 2:05. Tigers 17–10. Drive: 5 plays, 75 yards, 2:21.
- MIZ – Blake Craig 50-yard field goal, 0:00. Tigers 20–10. Drive: 7 plays, 49 yards, 1:33.

Third quarter

- MIZ – Jamal Roberts 5-yard run (Blake Craig kick), 12:24. Tigers 27–10. Drive: 6 plays, 75 yards, 2:36.
- MIZ – Blake Craig 52-yard field goal, 4:30. Tigers 30–10. Drive: 10 plays, 49 yards, 4:23.

Fourth quarter

- MIZ – Jamal Roberts 1-yard run (Cayden Lee pass), 14:55. Tigers 38–10. Drive: 4 plays, 80 yards, 1:50.
- MIZ – Jamal Roberts 80-yard run (Cayden Lee pass), 13:33. Tigers 45–10. Drive: 1 play, 80 yards, 0:12.
- FLA – TJ Abrams 42-yard pass from Tramell Jones Jr. (Patrick Durkin kick), 0:47. Tigers 45–17. Drive: 7 plays, 94 yards, 1:52.

Statistics	FLA	MIZ
First downs	19	24
Plays–yards	64–325	66–560
Rushes–yards	25–42	36–220
Passing yards	283	340
Passing: comp–att–int	26–39–0	23–30–0
Time of possession	28:20	31:40

Team	Category	Player	Statistics
Florida	Passing	Aaron Philo	21/34, 197 yards, TD
Florida	Rushing	London Montgomery	1 carry, 17 yards
Florida	Receiving	Dallas Wilson	4 receptions, 66 yards, TD
Missouri	Passing	Austin Simmons	23/30, 340 yards, 2 TD
Missouri	Rushing	Jamal Roberts	24 carries, 211 yards, 3 TD
Missouri	Receiving	Cayden Lee	8 receptions, 110 yards

=== vs. Texas A&M ===
Uniform Combination
Helmet (Block M)	Jersey	Pants

Texas A&M Aggies (3–2) at No. 14 Missouri Tigers (4–1) – Game summary

Quarter	1	2	3	4	Total
Aggies	3	0	0	3	6
No. 14 Tigers	0	10	10	7	27

at Faurot Field • Columbia, Missouri

- Date: October 10
- Game time: 11:00 a.m. CDT
- Game weather: Sunny • Temperature: 76 °F (24 °C) • Wind: S 7 mph
- Game attendance: 63,609
- Referee: Steve Marlowe
- TV announcers (ABC): Bob Wischusen, Louis Riddick, and Stormy Buonantony

Game information
First quarter
- TAMU – David Olano 53-yard field goal, 4:46. Aggies 3–0. Drive: 4 plays, 5 yards, 2:04.

Second quarter

- MIZ – Cayden Lee 32-yard pass from Austin Simmons (Blake Craig kick), 12:58. Tigers 7–3. Drive: 10 plays, 77 yards, 4:19.
- MIZ – Blake Craig 50-yard field goal, 8:40. Tigers 10–3. Drive: 4 plays, 2 yards, 1:22.

Third quarter

- MIZ – Blake Craig 51-yard field goal, 12:30. Tigers 13–3. Drive: 7 plays, 42 yards, 2:30.
- MIZ – Jamal Roberts 2-yard run (Blake Craig kick), 0:00. Tigers 20–3. Drive: 12 plays, 76 yards, 6:51.

Fourth quarter

- TAMU – David Olano 27-yard field goal, 9:51. Tigers 20–6. Drive: 12 plays, 45 yards, 5:09.
- MIZ – Jamal Roberts 54-yard run (Blake Craig kick), 2:49. Tigers 27–6. Drive: 2 plays, 57 yards, 0:14.

Statistics	TAMU	MIZ
First downs	10	20
Plays–yards	62–216	72–399
Rushes–yards	23–29	44–252
Passing yards	187	147
Passing: comp–att–int	19–39–2	14–28–1
Time of possession	28:48	31:12

Team	Category	Player	Statistics
Texas A&M	Passing	Marcel Reed	19/39, 187 yards, 2 INT
Texas A&M	Rushing	KJ Edwards	6 carries, 20 yards
Texas A&M	Receiving	TK Norman	3 receptions, 55 yards
Missouri	Passing	Austin Simmons	14/28, 147 yards, TD, INT
Missouri	Rushing	Jamal Roberts	34 carries, 222 yards, 2 TD
Missouri	Receiving	Cayden Lee	7 receptions, 94 yards, TD

=== at No. 9 Ole Miss ===
No. 13 Missouri Tigers (5–1) at No. 9 Ole Miss Rebels (4–1) – Game summary

Quarter	1	2	3	4	Total
No. 13 Tigers	3	0	0	0	3
No. 9 Rebels	7	14	0	10	31

at Vaught–Hemingway Stadium • Oxford, Mississippi

- Date: October 17
- Game time: 2:30 PM CDT
- Game weather: Sunny • Temperature: 66 °F (19 °C) • Wind: NE at 15 miles per hour (24 km/h)
- Game attendance: 67,510
- Referee: Kyle Olson
- TV announcers (SECN): Matt Schumacker, Aaron Murray, and Taylor Davis

Statistics	MIZ	MISS
First downs	17	27
Plays–yards	70–378	74–498
Rushes–yards	26–39	38–257
Passing yards	339	241
Passing: comp–att–int	25–44–1	20–36–0
Turnovers	1	1
Time of possession	28:54	31:06

Team	Category	Player	Statistics
Missouri	Passing	Austin Simmons	25/44, 339 yards, 1 INT
Missouri	Rushing	Jamal Roberts	20 carries, 39 yards
Missouri	Receiving	Donovan Olugbode	9 receptions, 127 yards
Ole Miss	Passing	Trinidad Chambliss	20/36, 241 yards, 3 TD
Ole Miss	Rushing	Kewan Lacy	16 carries, 122 yards
Ole Miss	Receiving	Caleb Cunningham	3 receptions, 61 yards, TD

=== at Arkansas (Battle Line Rivalry) ===
No. 23 Missouri Tigers (5–2) at Arkansas Razorbacks (3–4) – Game summary

Quarter	1	2	3	4	Total
No. 23 Tigers	10	3	14	7	34
Razorbacks	0	7	0	3	10

at Donald W. Reynolds Razorback Stadium • Fayetteville, Arkansas

- Date: October 31
- Game time: 6:45 PM CDT
- TV announcers (SECN): Dave Neal, Cole Cubelic, and Tori Petry

Statistics	MIZ	ARK
First downs	22	18
Plays–yards	66–390	70–288
Rushes–yards	35–211	36–59
Passing yards	179	229
Passing: comp–att–int	20–31–0	20–34–1
Time of possession	31:45	28:15

Team	Category	Player	Statistics
Missouri	Passing	Austin Simmons	20/31, 179 yards, 2 TD
Missouri	Rushing	Jamal Roberts	23 carries, 138 yards, 1 TD
Missouri	Receiving	Cayden Lee	6 receptions, 78 yards
Arkansas	Passing	KJ Jackson	20/34, 229 yards, 1 INT
Arkansas	Rushing	Cam Settles	12 carries, 38 yards
Arkansas	Receiving	Antonio Jordan	7 receptions, 106 yards

=== vs. No. 7 Texas ===
No. 7 Texas Longhorns (6–2) at No. 18 Missouri Tigers (6–2) – Game summary

Quarter	1	2	3	4	Total
No. 7 Longhorns	7	3	10	14	34
No. 18 Tigers	10	0	10	0	20

at Faurot Field • Columbia, Missouri

- Date: November 7
- Game time: 11 AM CST
- Game weather: Cloudy • Temperature: 44 °F (7 °C) • Wind: NW at 3 miles per hour (4.8 km/h)
- Game attendance: 63,609
- Referee: David Smith
- TV announcers (ESPN): Joe Tessitore, Jesse Palmer, and Kris Budden
  Notes: Numerous booth reviews went against Missouri in this game, including a controversial call late in the 3rd quarter in which an apparent incomplete pass by Arch Manning on 3rd and 10 from the Missouri 39 yard line was instead ruled a fumble and resulted in a 15 yard gain and a first down for Texas. Texas would score the game-tying touchdown 3 plays later. ESPN color-commentator Jesse Palmer said on air following this play that "I’m just going to say this. No skin in the game, [but] if you’re a Missouri fan, if you’re Eli Drinkwitz, you are livid, because it does feel like a lot of these calls are going against Missouri today."

Game information

First quarter

- (8:40) MIZ — Brett Norfleet 2-yard pass from Austin Simmons (Blake Craig kick), (Drive: 7 plays, 68 yards, 3:22; MIZ 7-0)
- (6:10) TEX — Derrek Cooper 24-yard pass from Arch Manning (Gianni Spetic kick), (Drive: 7 plays, 65 yards, 2:30; Tied 7-7)
- (1:06) MIZ — Blake Craig 22-yard field goal (Drive: 9 plays, 43 yards, 3:07; MIZ 10-7)

Second quarter

- (1:57) TEX — Gianni Spetic 27-yard field goal (Drive: 6 plays, 30 yards, 3:14; Tied 10-10)

Third quarter

- (11:51) MIZ — Blake Craig 48-yard field goal (Drive: 7 plays, 36 yards, 3:09; MIZ 13-10)
- (5:41) TEX — Gianni Spetic 34-yard field goal (Drive: 10 plays, 56 yards, 5:08; Tied 13-13)
- (4:52) MIZ — Naeshaun Montgomery 72-yard pass from Austin Simmons (Blake Craig kick), (Drive: 2 plays, 75 yards, 0:49; MIZ 20-13)
- (1:52) TEX — Jermaine Bishop Jr. 25-yard pass from Arch Manning (Gianni Spetic kick), (Drive: 9 plays, 75 yards, 3:00; Tied 20-20)

Fourth quarter

- (5:03) TEX — Raleek Brown 23-yard pass from Arch Manning (Gianni Spetic kick), (Drive: 6 plays, 54 yards, 2:53; TEX 27-20)
- (1:25) TEX — Raleek Brown 8-yard run (Gianni Spetic kick), (Drive: 3 plays, 6 yards, 0:16; TEX 34-20)

Statistics	TEX	MIZ
First downs	21	17
Plays–yards	69–401	68–336
Rushes–yards	31–104	24–84
Passing yards	297	252
Passing: comp–att–int	28–38–0	23–44–0
Time of possession	32:26	27:34

Team	Category	Player	Statistics
Texas	Passing	Arch Manning	28/38, 297 yards, 3 TD
Texas	Rushing	Raleek Brown	17 carries, 85 yards, TD
Texas	Receiving	Emmett Mosley V	5 receptions, 85 yards
Missouri	Passing	Austin Simmons	23/43, 252 yards, 2 TD
Missouri	Rushing	Jamal Roberts	19 carries, 66 yards
Missouri	Receiving	Naeshaun Montgomery	2 receptions, 81 yards, TD

=== at No. 1 Georgia ===
No. 22 Missouri Tigers (6–3) at No. 1 Georgia Bulldogs (8–1) – Game summary

Quarter	1	2	3	4	Total
No. 22 Tigers	0	7	7	7	21
No. 1 Bulldogs	21	10	10	7	48

at Sanford Stadium • Athens, Georgia

- Date: November 14
- Game time: 2:30 PM CST
- Game weather: Sunny • Temperature: 57 °F (14 °C) • Wind: NW 9 miles per hour (14 km/h)
- Game attendance: 93,033
- Referee: Ted Pitts
- TV announcers (ABC): Sean McDonough, Greg McElroy, and Katie George

Game information

First quarter

- (13:59) UGA – Nate Frazier 4-yard run, Peyton Woodring kick (Drive: 2 plays, 7 yards, 0:45; Georgia 7–0)
- (10:33) UGA – Gunner Stockton 8-yard run, Peyton Woodring kick (Drive: 4 plays, 60 yards, 2:00; Georgia 14–0)
- (2:03) UGA – Nate Frazier 3-yard run, Peyton Woodring kick (Drive: 11 plays, 87 yards, 5:58; Georgia 21–0)

Second quarter

- (10:43) UGA – Peyton Woodring 41-yard field goal (Drive: 10 plays, 51 yards, 5:31; Georgia 24–0)
- (6:52) UGA – Isiah Canion 12-yard pass from Gunner Stockton, Peyton Woodring kick (Drive: 5 plays, 61 yards, 2:21; Georgia 31–0)
- (3:05) MIZ – Naeshaun Montgomery 15-yard pass from Austin Simmons, Blake Craig kick (Drive: 8 plays, 75 yards, 3:42; Georgia 31–7)

Third quarter

- (10:42) UGA – Peyton Woodring 40-yard field goal (Drive: 7 plays, 15 yards, 4:11; Georgia 34–7)
- (6:15) UGA – Nate Frazier 3-yard run, Peyton Woodring kick (Drive: 6 plays, 85 yards, 3:29; Georgia 41–7)
- (0:45) MIZ – Donovan Olugbode 11-yard pass from Austin Simmons, Blake Craig kick (Drive: 11 plays, 74 yards, 5:23; Georgia 41–14)

Fourth quarter

- (12:53) UGA – Chauncey Bowens 5-yard run, Peyton Woodring kick (Drive: 6 plays, 75 yards, 2:52; Georgia 48–14)
- (5:15) MIZ – Kenric Lanier 2-yard pass from Austin Simmons, Blake Craig kick (Drive: 13 plays, 81 yards, 7:32; Georgia 48–21)

Statistics	MIZ	UGA
First downs	15	23
Plays–yards	61–286	60–468
Rushes–yards	32–102	34–182
Passing yards	184	286
Passing: comp–att–int	18–29–1	20–26–0
Time of possession	27:58	32:02

Team	Category	Player	Statistics
Missouri	Passing	Austin Simmons	17/25, 175 yards, 3 TD, INT
Missouri	Rushing	Jamal Roberts	19 carries, 62 yards
Missouri	Receiving	Donovan Olugbode	4 receptions, 67 yards, TD
Georgia	Passing	Gunner Stockton	18/24, 252 yards, TD
Georgia	Rushing	Nate Frazier	14 carries, 72 yards, 3 TD
Georgia	Receiving	Craig Dandridge	6 receptions, 85 yards

=== vs. No. 16 Kentucky ===
No. 16 Kentucky Wildcats (7–3) at Missouri Tigers (6–4) – Game summary

Quarter	1	2	3	4	Total
No. 16 Wildcats	3	0	3	8	14
Tigers	7	7	14	0	28

at Faurot Field • Columbia, Missouri

- Date: November 21
- Game time: 6:30 PM CST
- Game attendance: 63,609
- TV announcers (SECN): Matt Schumacker, Aaron Murray, and Taylor Davis

Statistics	UK	MIZ
First downs	28	16
Plays–yards	78–446	50–391
Rushes–yards	35–158	28–77
Passing yards	288	314
Passing: comp–att–int	27–43–2	17–22–1
Time of possession	33:44	26:16

Team	Category	Player	Statistics
Kentucky	Passing	Kenny Minchey	27/43, 2 INT
Kentucky	Rushing	Jovantae Barnes	16 carries, 69 yards, 1 TD
Kentucky	Receiving	Kenny Darby	8 receptions, 110 yards
Missouri	Passing	Austin Simmons	17/22, 314 yards, 4 TD, 1 INT
Missouri	Rushing	Jamal Roberts	23 carries, 67 yards
Missouri	Receiving	Donovan Olugbode	5 receptions, 105 yards, 2 TD

=== vs. Oklahoma (rivalry) ===
Oklahoma Sooners (7–4) at Missouri Tigers (7–4) – Game summary

Quarter	1	2	3	4	Total
Sooners	0	0	0	0	0
Tigers	0	0	0	0	0

at Faurot Field • Columbia, Missouri

- Date: November 28
- Game time: 3:15 PM CST
- TV: SECN

Statistics	OU	MIZ
First downs		
Plays–yards		
Rushes–yards		
Passing yards		
Passing: comp–att–int		
Time of possession		

Team	Category	Player	Statistics
Oklahoma	Passing		
Oklahoma	Rushing		
Oklahoma	Receiving		
Missouri	Passing		
Missouri	Rushing		
Missouri	Receiving		

== Coaching staff ==
Name	Position	Seasons at Missouri	Alma mater
Eliah Drinkwitz	Head Coach	7	Arkansas Tech (2004)
Chip Lindsey	Offensive Coordinator	1	Alabama (1997)
Corey Batoon	Defensive coordinator/safeties	3	Long Beach State (1991)
John Papuchis	Special teams coordinator	1	Virginia Tech (2001)
Garrett Riley	Quarterbacks	1	Texas Tech (2012)
Al Pogue	Cornerbacks	5	Alabama State (1996)
David Blackwell	Defensive line (Interior)	3	East Carolina (1997)
Derek Nicholson	Linebackers and co-defensive coordinator	1	Florida State (2009)
Jacob Peeler	Wide receivers	4	Louisiana Tech (2007)
Brandon Jones	Offensive line	3	Texas Tech (2007)
Curtis Luper	Running backs	6	Stephen F. Austin (1996)
Brian Early	Defensive line (Edge)	2	University of Arkansas at Monticello (1994)
Chris Ball	Defensive analyst	2	Missouri Western State (1987)

== Personnel ==
2026 Missouri Tigers football team roster
Players
Coaches
Offense

Pos.	#	Name	Class
WR	0	Naeshaun Montgomery	So
WR	1	Donovan Olugbode	So
WR	2	Caleb Goodie Sr.	Sr
WR	3	DaMarion Fowlkes	So
WR	4	Shaun Terry II	So
QB	5	Matt Zollers	So
QB	7	Gavin Sidwar	Fr
QB	10	Nick Evers	Sr
WR	11	Jabari Brady	Fr
WR	12	Devyon Hill-Lomax	Fr
QB	13	Austin Simmons	Jr
QB	14	Brett Brown	Sr
WR	17	Kenric Lanier II	Jr
TE	18	Isaac Jensen	Fr
WR	19	Cayden Lee	Sr
RB	20	Jamal Roberts	Jr
RB	21	Malae Fonoti	So
RB	22	Max Warner	Fr
RB	24	Xai'Shaun Edwards	Jr
RB	26	Brady Hultman	Sr
RB	28	Preston Hatfield	Fr
RB	29	Ahmad Hardy	Jr
RB	31	Anthony Favrow	5th
WR	32	Gavin Wyatt	Sr
WR	33	DJ McBride II	Fr
OL	51	Luke Work	Jr
OL	52	Zack Owens	Sr
OL	54	Josh Atkins	5th
OL	55	Will Kemna	So
OL	56	Dominick Giudice	GS
OL	58	Khalief Canty Jr.	Fr
OL	63	Chace Missouri	Jr
OL	64	Joe Schranz	So
OL	65	Brysen Wessell	Fr
OL	66	Logan Reichert	Jr
OL	69	Braylon Ellison	Fr
OL	70	Cayden Green	Sr
OL	71	Ryan Jostes	So
OL	72	Colin Sorensen	Jr
OL	73	Tristan Wilson	Sr
TE	74	Whit Hafer	So
OL	75	Jack Lange	So
OL	77	Curtis Peagler	Sr
OL	78	DJ Jones	Fr
WR	80	Jayden Bolton	5th
WR	81	Noah Flaskamp	Sr
WR	82	Karsten Fiene	Fr
TE	84	Adam Molitor	Jr
TE	86	Jordon Harris	Sr
TE	87	Brett Norfleet	Sr
TE	88	Gavin Hoffman	So
TE	89	Jude James	So

Defense

Pos.	#	Name	Class
LB	0	Robert Woodyard Jr.	Sr
CB	1	Chris Graves Jr.	Sr
CB	2	Sione Laulea	Sr
DT	3	Marquis Gracial	Sr
S	4	Trajen Greco	Jr
LB	5	Nicholas Rodriguez	Jr
LB	6	Jeremiah Beasley	Jr
S	7	Kensley Louidor-Faustin	Jr
DT	8	Donta Simpson	So
LB	9	Dante McClellan	So
DE	10	Daeden Hopkins	So
DE	11	Langden Kitchen	Sr
DE	12	Malik Bryant	Sr
DE	13	Jaden Jones	Sr
S	14	CJ Bass III	So
S	15	Santana Banner	Jr
LB	16	Bobby Washington Jr.	Sr
LB	17	Brian Huff	So
S	18	JaDon Blair	Fr
DE	19	Darris Smith	Sr
CB	20	Cameron Keys	So
CB	21	Jahlil Florence	Sr
S	22	Elijah Dotson	So
CB	24	Nicholas Deloach Jr.	Jr
LB	25	Jason King	So
CB	26	Jaxson Gates	Fr
S	28	Jayden McGregory	Fr
DE	29	Kamauryn Morgan	So
S	30	Carter Stewart	Fr
CB	31	Nasir Pogue	5th
S	32	Brody Jones	Fr
LB	33	JJ Bush	Fr
S	34	Jackson Hancock	So
DB	35	Ahmod Billins	Fr
CB	36	Trashundon Neal	Fr
LB	38	Keenan Harris	Fr
S	39	Maddux Hermestroff	So
S	41	Graham Faust	Fr
LB	46	Jackson Daily	Jr
DE	52	Demarcus Johnson	Jr
LB	53	Tommy Reese	Sr
DE	55	Cavan Tuley	Sr
DT	57	Mark Hensley	Sr
DT	90	Sterling Webb	5th
DT	91	Elias Williams	So
DT	92	Jason Dowell	So
DT	93	Jocques Felix	Fr
DT	94	Sam Williams	Jr
DT	95	Jalen Marshall	Sr
DE	96	Aidan Dubbert	Sr
DE	97	CJ May	So
DT	98	Tajh Overton	Fr
DT	99	Jadon Frick	Jr

Special teams

Pos.	#	Name	Class
K	19	Blake Craig	Jr
P	34	Mark Shenouda	Sr
LS	36	Sean Gross	So
LS	38	Henry Crosby	So
K, P	40	Brunno Reus	So
P	43	John Butcher	Sr
K	48	Oliver Robbins	Jr
LS	49	Brett Le Blanc	Sr

Head coach

- Eliah Drinkwitz

Coordinators/assistant coaches

- Corey Batoon – Defensive coordinator
- Chip Lindsey – Offensive coordinator
- John Papuchis – Special teams coordinator/defensive assistant
- Al Pogue – Assistant head coach/cornerbacks
- Derek Nicholson – Co-defensive coordinator/linebackers
- Alex Atkins – Tight ends
- David Blackwell – Defensive tackles
- Brian Early – Pass rush specialist/edge rushers
- Chop Harbin – Defensive linemen
- Brandon Jones – Offensive linemen
- Curtis Luper – Running backs
- Jacob Peeler – Wide receivers/recruiting coordinator
- Garrett Riley – Quarterbacks
- Jacob Yoro – Pass game coordinator/safeties
- Bryson Abraham – Offensive assistant/wide receivers
- Kyle Ashby – Defensive assistant/advanced scouting & analytics
- Christopher Ball – Defensive assistant/linebackers
- Evan Boehm – Offensive assistant/assistant offensive line
- Brendan Bognar – Offensive assistant/quarterbacks
- Liam Gray – Defensive assistant/safeties
- Brian Hamilton – Defensive assistant/director advanced scouting & analytics/run game specialist
- Sabbath Joseph – Defensive assistant/edges
- Luke Meadows – Offensive assistant/offensive line
- Travis Russell – Offensive assistant/advanced scouting & analytics
- Jonathan Rutledge – Special teams assistant
- Wayne Younger – Defensive assistant/cornerbacks

Legend

- (C) Team captain
- (S) Suspended
- (I) Ineligible
- Injured
- Redshirt

Roster
Last update: 9/11/26
