= 2025 Missouri Tigers football team =

American college football season

2025 Missouri Tigers football

Gator Bowl, L 7–13 vs. Virginia
- Conference: Southeastern Conference
- Record: 8–5 (4–4 SEC)
- Head coach: Eliah Drinkwitz (6th season)
- Offensive coordinator: Kirby Moore (3rd season)
- Offensive scheme: Pistol
- Defensive coordinator: Corey Batoon (2nd season)
- Base defense: 4–2–5
- Home stadium: Faurot Field

2025 Southeastern Conference football standings
	Conf.			Overall
Team	W		L	W		L
No. 9 Alabama y^	7	–	1	11	–	4
No. 6 Georgia y$^	7	–	1	12	–	2
No. 3 Ole Miss ^	7	–	1	13	–	2
No. 8 Texas A&M ^	7	–	1	11	–	2
No. 13 Oklahoma ^	6	–	2	10	–	3
No. 12 Texas	6	–	2	10	–	3
No. 15 Vanderbilt	6	–	2	10	–	3
Missouri	4	–	4	8	–	5
Tennessee	4	–	4	8	–	5
LSU	3	–	5	7	–	6
Kentucky	2	–	6	5	–	7
Florida	2	–	6	4	–	8
Auburn	1	–	7	5	–	7
Mississippi State	1	–	7	5	–	8
South Carolina	1	–	7	4	–	8
Arkansas	0	–	8	2	–	10
Championship: Georgia 28, Alabama 7
^ – College Football Playoff participant; $ – Conference champion; y – Championship game participant; Rankings from AP Poll

The 2025 Missouri Tigers football team represented the University of Missouri in the Southeastern Conference (SEC) during the 2025 NCAA Division I FBS football season. The Tigers were led by Eliah Drinkwitz in his sixth season as their head coach. The Tigers play their home games at Faurot Field located in Columbia, Missouri. The conference opponents were the same in 2025 as in 2024, with the only difference being the host cities have been swapped. Missouri also played Kansas in football for the first time since 2011. The Tigers are coming off a 10–3 season and a 27–24 win over Iowa in the 2024 Music City Bowl.

Missouri's linebackers coach and co-defensive coordinator D.J. Smith left the program to become the defensive coordinator at Appalachian State. On January 16, 2025, it was announced that University of Miami linebackers coach Derek Nicholson would replace Smith. On May 16th, interior defensive line coach Al Davis resigned his position due to personal reasons, with David Blackwell taking over Smith's duties.

Eli Drinkwitz and his staff were very active in the transfer portal once again, bringing in 17 transfers during the winter transfer period. These included offensive skill players such as running back Ahmad Hardy (formerly of Louisiana-Monroe) and wide receiver Kevin Coleman Jr. (formerly of Mississippi State). They also brought in transfer QB Beau Pribula from Penn State, who is expected to compete with Sam Horn for the starting QB role. On defense, Missouri brought in Big 12 Defensive Freshman of the Year Josiah Trotter from West Virginia, and former 5 star recruit and one of the highest rated transfers in the portal in Georgia OLB Damon Wilson II, who is expected to play as an edge rusher for the Tigers.

Missouri was predicted to finish 12th of 16 in the SEC by media covering SEC Football Media Days in Atlanta, Georgia, with OL Cayden Green named to the preseason first-team All-SEC. Missouri received votes in both the Preseason Coaches Poll and the AP poll.

Drinkwitz announced that he would not name an official starting QB heading into the season, and that Beau Pribula would play the first half and Sam Horn would play the second half in the opening game vs. Central Arkansas. Both QB Sam Horn and kicker Blake Craig were injured in the opening game, and would miss the remainder of the season. In week 2, Missouri overcame a 21–6 deficit to beat arch-rival Kansas, and would debut at No. 25 in the AP Poll following the win. After a 52–10 win over Louisiana in week 3, Missouri would also break into the top 25 in the Coaches Poll at No. 22.

Missouri finished the 2025 regular season in a tie for 8th place in the SEC. The team's four regular season losses came against teams that ended the season ranked in the top 15 of the AP Poll, and each of the team's eight wins came against teams with a losing record. Missouri ended the season with a close 13-7 loss to Virginia in the Gator Bowl and was unranked in the final polls. 6 players (Note: Zion Young (DE/OLB): 2nd round, 45th overall by the Baltimore Ravens Josiah Trotter (LB): 2nd round, 46th overall by the Tampa Bay Buccaneers Chris McClellan (DT): 3rd round, 77th overall by the Green Bay Packers Keagen Trost (OT): 3rd round, 93rd overall by the Green Bay Packers Kevin Coleman Jr. (WR): 5th round, 177th overall by the Miami Dolphins Toriano Pride Jr. (CB): 7th round, 220th overall by the Buffalo Bills) on the 2025 Missouri roster got drafted in the 2026 NFL draft, tied for the 16th-most of any 2025 college team.

The Missouri Tigers drew an average home attendance of 57,321, the 33rd-highest of all college football teams.

== Offseason ==
=== Departures ===
2025 Missouri offseason departures
Name	Position	Notes
Armand Membou	OT	Declared for 2025 NFL draft
Luther Burden III	WR	Declared for 2025 NFL Draft
Brady Cook	QB	Out of eligibility
Theo Wease Jr.	WR	Out of eligibility
Nate Noel	RB	Out of eligibility
Marcus Carroll	RB	Out of eligibility
Mookie Cooper	RB	Out of eligibility
Tyler Stephens	TE	Out of eligibility
Kristian Williams	DT	Out of eligibility
Marcus Bryant	OT	Out of eligibility
Drake Heismeyer	OL	Out of eligibility
Mitchell Walters	OL	Out of eligibility
Cam'Ron Johnson	G	Out of eligibility
Chuck Hicks	LB	Out of eligibility
Corey Flagg Jr.	LB	Out of eligibility
Will Norris	LB	Out of eligibility
Marcus Clarke	CB	Out of eligibility
Johnny Walker Jr.	DE	Out of eligibility
Joe Moore	DE	Out of eligibility
Joseph Charleston	S	Out of eligibility
Sidney Williams	S	Out of eligibility
Tre'Vez Johnson	S	Out of eligibility
Trent Flint	LS	Out of eligibility
Courtney Crutchfield	WR	Transferred to Arkansas
Williams Nwaneri	Edge	Transferred to Nebraska
Jaylen Brown	Edge	Transferred to South Carolina
Kewan Lacy	RB	Transferred to Ole Miss
Mekhi Miller	WR	Transferred to Tulsa
Aidan Glover	QB	Transferred to Northwest Mississippi Community College
Phillip Roche	S	Entered Transfer Portal
Jack McGarry	IOL	Transferred to Illinois State
Brayshawn Littlejohn	LB	Transferred to Appalachian State
Orion Phillips	P	Transferred to Utah
Jaren Sensabaugh	CB	Transferred to NC State
Boyton Cheney	CB	Entered Transfer Portal
Drew Pyne	QB	Transferred to Bowling Green
Jahkai Lang	Edge	Transferred to SMU
Ja'Marion Wayne	S	Transferred to Coastal Carolina
Mikai Gbayor	LB	Transferred to North Carolina
Talan Chandler	IOL	Transferred to Northwestern
Eddie Kelly Jr.	Edge	Transferred to West Virginia
Austyn Dendy	RB	Transferred to Bowling Green
Luke Bauer	P	Transferred to Michigan
Brett Brown	QB	Transferred to Middle Tennessee
Bryce Jackson	RB	Transferred to Missouri Valley College
Jaden Abongo Jr.	WR	Transferred to Washburn
Colton Westbrook	WR	Transferred to Northwest Missouri State
Caleb Pyfrom	OL	Transferred to Garden City CC
Jack Kautz	LS	Transferred to Eastern Michigan
Brody Boehm	K	Transferred to Ball State
Will Safris	P	Transferred to Utah State
Nick Quadrini	K	Entered Transfer Portal
Gerald Lacy Jr.	S	Transferred to Trinity Valley CC
Jahkai Lang	DE	Transferred to SMU
Grayson Cutchlow	LB	Transferred to Missouri State
Jaylen Brown	Edge	Transferred to West Virginia

=== Incoming transfers ===
Name	Position	Eligibility Remaining	Previous School
Ahmad Hardy	RB	3 years	Louisiana–Monroe
Kevin Coleman Jr.	WR	1 year	Mississippi State
Josiah Trotter	LB	3 years	West Virginia
Santana Banner	S	3 years	Northern Illinois
Mikai Gbayor	LB	2 years	Nebraska
Mose Phillips	S	2 years	Virginia Tech
Langden Kitchen	DL	2 years	Northwest Missouri State
Dominick Giudice	OL	2 years	Michigan
Keagen Trost	OL	1 year	Wake Forest
Nate Johnson	Edge	2 years	Appalachian State
Connor Weselman	P	1 year	Stanford
Beau Pribula	QB	2 years	Penn State
Johnny Williams IV	OT	3 years	West Virginia
Stephen Hall	DB	1 year	Washington State
Jalen Catalon	S	1 year	UNLV
Vince Brown II	TE	1 year	Colorado State
Damon Wilson II	Edge	2 years	Georgia
Gavin Hoffman	TE	4 years	Iowa
Xavier Loyd	WR	1 year	Illinois State
Jaylen Early	OL	2 years	Florida State
Bralen Henderson	DT	1 year	Ohio
Gavin Wyatt	WR	3 years	William Jewell

=== 2025 recruiting class ===
College recruiting
Name	Hometown	School	Height	Weight	Commit date
Javion Hilson; Edge	Cocoa, Florida	Cocoa High School	6 ft 3.5 in (1.92 m)	225 lb (102 kg)	Dec 4, 2024
Javion Hilson; Edge	Recruit ratings: Rivals: 247Sports: On3: ESPN: (83)				
Matt Zollers; QB	Royersford, Pennsylvania	Spring-Ford Area High School	6 ft 3.5 in (1.92 m)	205 lb (93 kg)	Apr 4, 2024
Matt Zollers; QB	Recruit ratings: Rivals: 247Sports: On3: ESPN: (83)				
Donovan Olugbode; WR	Naperville, Illinois	IMG Academy	6 ft 1 in (1.85 m)	200 lb (91 kg)	Jul 5, 2024
Donovan Olugbode; WR	Recruit ratings: Rivals: 247Sports: On3: ESPN: (82)				
Marquise Davis; RB	Cleveland, Ohio	Cleveland Heights High School	5 ft 11 in (1.80 m)	200 lb (91 kg)	Dec 1, 2024
Marquise Davis; RB	Recruit ratings: Rivals: 247Sports: On3: ESPN: (83)				
Jack Lange; OL	Eureka, Missouri	Eureka High School (Missouri)	6 ft 8 in (2.03 m)	275 lb (125 kg)	Apr 24, 2024
Jack Lange; OL	Recruit ratings: Rivals: 247Sports: On3: ESPN: (82)				
Daeden Hopkins; Edge	Hermann, Missouri	Hermann High School	6 ft 6 in (1.98 m)	230 lb (100 kg)	Apr 30, 2024
Daeden Hopkins; Edge	Recruit ratings: Rivals: 247Sports: On3: ESPN: (81)				
DaMarion Fowlkes; WR	Olney, Maryland	Our Lady of Good Counsel High School	5 ft 10 in (1.78 m)	175 lb (79 kg)	Dec 2, 2024
DaMarion Fowlkes; WR	Recruit ratings: Rivals: 247Sports: On3: ESPN: (79)				
Dante McClellan; LB	Canton, Ohio	McKinley High School	6 ft 0.5 in (1.84 m)	210 lb (95 kg)	Apr 22, 2024
Dante McClellan; LB	Recruit ratings: Rivals: 247Sports: On3: ESPN: (80)				
Keiton Jones; OL	Coffeyville, Kansas	Field Kindley High School	6 ft 4 in (1.93 m)	315 lb (143 kg)	Jul 7, 2024
Keiton Jones; OL	Recruit ratings: Rivals: 247Sports: On3: ESPN: (77)				
Brendon Haygood; RB	Wylie, Texas	Sachse High School	5 ft 9 in (1.75 m)	190 lb (86 kg)	Dec 3, 2024
Brendon Haygood; RB	Recruit ratings: Rivals: 247Sports: On3: ESPN: (76)				
Henry Fenuku; OL	Fort Worth, Texas	North Crowley High School	6 ft 3 in (1.91 m)	285 lb (129 kg)	Jun 10, 2024
Henry Fenuku; OL	Recruit ratings: Rivals: 247Sports: On3: ESPN: (79)				
Charles Bass; S	St. Louis, Missouri	East St. Louis High School	6 ft 0.5 in (1.84 m)	185 lb (84 kg)	Jul 10, 2024
Charles Bass; S	Recruit ratings: Rivals: 247Sports: On3: ESPN: (78)				
Shaun Terry; WR	Ironton, Ohio	Ironton High School	5 ft 10 in (1.78 m)	165 lb (75 kg)	Jun 20, 2024
Shaun Terry; WR	Recruit ratings: Rivals: 247Sports: On3: ESPN: (79)				
Jason Dowell; DL	Belleville, Illinois	Althoff Catholic High School	6 ft 4 in (1.93 m)	285 lb (129 kg)	Apr 19, 2024
Jason Dowell; DL	Recruit ratings: Rivals: 247Sports: On3: ESPN: (78)				
Dakotah Terrell; TE	Pocola, Oklahoma	Pocola High School	6 ft 9 in (2.06 m)	210 lb (95 kg)	Sep 30, 2024
Dakotah Terrell; TE	Recruit ratings: Rivals: 247Sports: On3: ESPN: (79)				
Mark Manfred; CB	Marietta, Georgia	Sprayberry High School	6 ft 3 in (1.91 m)	175 lb (79 kg)	Jun 23, 2024
Mark Manfred; CB	Recruit ratings: Rivals: 247Sports: On3: ESPN: (79)				
Jason King; LB	St. Louis, Missouri	De Smet Jesuit High School	6 ft 1 in (1.85 m)	210 lb (95 kg)	Apr 27, 2024
Jason King; LB	Recruit ratings: Rivals: 247Sports: On3: ESPN: (77)				
Robert Meyer; K	Auburn, California	Colfax High School	6 ft 3 in (1.91 m)	200 lb (91 kg)	Jul 22, 2024
Robert Meyer; K	Recruit ratings: On3:				
Overall recruit ranking: Rivals: 22 247Sports: 19 On3: 18 ESPN: 26
Note: In many cases, Scout, Rivals, 247Sports, On3, and ESPN may conflict in their listings of height and weight.; In these cases, the average was taken. ESPN grades are on a 100-point scale.; Sources: "Rivals commits". Rivals.; "2025 Team Ranking". Rivals.com.; "247Sports commits". 247Sports.

== Schedule ==
Date	Time	Opponent	Rank	Site	TV	Result	Attendance
August 28	6:30 p.m.	Central Arkansas*		Faurot Field; Columbia, MO	SECN	W 61–6	57,321
September 6	2:30 p.m.	Kansas*		Faurot Field; Columbia, MO (Border War / SEC Nation)	ESPN2	W 42–31	57,321
September 13	12:00 p.m.	Louisiana*	No. 25	Faurot Field; Columbia, MO	SECN+/ESPN+	W 52–10	57,321
September 20	6:00 p.m.	South Carolina	No. 23	Faurot Field; Columbia, MO	ESPN	W 29–20	57,321
September 27	6:30 p.m.	UMass*^{†}	No. 20	Faurot Field; Columbia, MO	ESPNU	W 42–6	57,321
October 11	11:00 a.m.	No. 8 Alabama	No. 14	Faurot Field; Columbia, MO (SEC Nation)	ABC	L 24–27	57,321
October 18	6:45 p.m.	at Auburn	No. 16	Jordan–Hare Stadium; Auburn, AL	SECN	W 23–17 ^{2OT}	87,798
October 25	2:30 p.m.	at No. 10 Vanderbilt	No. 15	FirstBank Stadium; Nashville, TN (College GameDay)	ESPN	L 10–17	35,000
November 8	2:30 p.m.	No. 3 Texas A&M	No. 22	Faurot Field; Columbia, MO	ABC	L 17–38	57,321
November 15	6:45 p.m.	Mississippi State		Faurot Field; Columbia, MO	SECN	W 49–27	57,321
November 22	11:00 a.m.	at No. 8 Oklahoma	No. 22	Gaylord Family Oklahoma Memorial Stadium; Norman, OK (rivalry)	ABC	L 6–17	83,541
November 29	2:30 p.m.	at Arkansas		Donald W. Reynolds Razorback Stadium; Fayetteville, AR (Battle Line Rivalry)	SECN	W 31–17	61,508
December 27	6:30 p.m.	vs. No. 19 Virginia*		EverBank Stadium; Jacksonville, FL (Gator Bowl)	ABC	L 7–13	31,802
*Non-conference game; ^{†}Homecoming; Rankings from AP Poll (and CFP Rankings, after November 4) – Released prior to game; All times are in Central time

== Rankings ==
Ranking movements Legend: ██ Increase in ranking ██ Decrease in ranking — = Not ranked RV = Received votes
	Week																
Poll	Pre	1	2	3	4	5	6	7	8	9	10	11	12	13	14	15	Final
AP	RV	RV	25	23	20	19	14	16	15	19	19	RV	23	RV	25	25	RV
Coaches	RV	RV	RV	22	19	18	14	16	14	20	17	24	21	RV	RV	RV	RV
CFP	Not released										22	—	22	—	—	—	Not released

== Game summaries ==
=== Central Arkansas (FCS) ===
Uniform Combination
Helmet (Oval Tiger)	Jersey	Pants

Game One - Central Arkansas Bears (FCS) (0–0) at Missouri Tigers (0–0) – Game summary

Quarter	1	2	3	4	Total
Bears (FCS)	0	0	0	6	6
Tigers	9	17	14	21	61

at Faurot Field • Columbia, MO

- Date: August 28
- Game time: 6:30 p.m. CDT
- Game weather: 82 degrees, sunny, E 5 mph
- Game attendance: 57,321 (sellout)
- Referee: James Carter
- TV announcers (SECN): Lowell Galindo (play-by-play), Aaron Murray (analyst), and Lauren Sisler (sideline)

Game information

First quarter

- (11:06) MIZ: Marquis Johnson 49-yard pass from Beau Pribula (Two-point run conversion failed) (Drive: 4 plays, 64 yards, 2:12; Missouri 6–0)
- (2:22) MIZ: Blake Craig 49-yard field goal (Drive: 10 plays, 50 yards, 4:29; Missouri 9–0)

Second quarter

- (9:33) MIZ: Blake Craig 55-yard field goal (Drive: 14 plays, 35 yards, 6:05; Missouri 12–0)
- (6:48) MIZ: Beau Pribula 31-yard run (Blake Craig kick) (Drive: 2 plays, 33 yards, 0:53; Missouri 19–0)
- (0:08) MIZ: Brett Norfleet 1-yard pass from Beau Pribula (Blake Craig kick) (Drive: 15 plays, 99 yards, 3:30; Missouri 26–0)

Third quarter

- (11:23) MIZ: Ahmad Hardy 4-yard run (Blake Craig kick) (Drive: 7 plays, 85 yards, 3:27; Missouri 33–0)
- (4:54) MIZ: Beau Pribula 1-yard run (Robert Meyer kick) (Drive: 7 plays, 99 yards, 3:09; Missouri 40–0)

Fourth quarter

- (11:05) MIZ: Jude James 40-yard pass from Matt Zollers (Robert Meyer kick) (Drive: 4 plays, 54 yards, 1:51; Missouri 47–0)
- (7:32) MIZ: Marquise Davis 3-yard run (Robert Meyer kick) (Drive: 4 plays, 14 yards, 2:00; Missouri 54–0)
- (2:48) MIZ: Dante McClellan 83-yard interception return (Robert Meyer kick) (Missouri 61-0)
- (0:22) CARK: Manny Smith 3-yard pass from Luther Richesson (Two-point run conversion failed) (Drive: 10 plays, 63 yards, 2:21; Missouri 61–6)

Statistics	CARK	MIZ
First downs	15	25
Plays–yards	62–227	68–562
Rushes–yards	39–154	37–221
Passing yards	73	341
Passing: comp–att–int	13–23–1	26–31–0
Turnovers	2	0
Time of possession	29:51	30:09

Team	Category	Player	Statistics
Central Arkansas	Passing	Luther Richesson	13/23, 73 yards, TD, INT
Central Arkansas	Rushing	Landen Chambers	15 carries, 63 yards
Central Arkansas	Receiving	Malachi Henry	3 receptions, 18 yards
Missouri	Passing	Beau Pribula	23/28, 283 yards, 2 TD
Missouri	Rushing	Ahmad Hardy	10 carries, 100 yards, TD
Missouri	Receiving	Marquis Johnson	5 receptions, 134 yards, TD

=== Kansas (Border War) ===
Uniform Combination
Helmet (Block M)	Jersey	Pants

Game Two - Kansas Jayhawks (2–0) at Missouri Tigers (1–0) – Game summary

Quarter	1	2	3	4	Total
Jayhawks	21	0	3	7	31
Tigers	6	15	7	14	42

at Faurot Field • Columbia, MO

- Date: September 6
- Game time: 2:30 p.m.
- Game weather: Sunny, 74 degrees, 10 mph WNW
- Game attendance: 57,321
- Referee: Mike McCabe (Big 12)
- TV announcers (ESPN2): Mike Monaco (play-by-play), Kirk Morrison (analyst), and Dawn Davenport (sideline)

Game information

First quarter

- (10:53) MIZ: Ahmad Hardy 32-yard run (Robert Meyer kick blocked). (Drive: 5 plays, 71 yards, 2:09; Missouri 6–0)
- (8:09) KU: DeShawn Hanika 15-yard pass from Jalon Daniels (Laith Marjan kick). (Drive: 7 plays, 62 yards, 2:41; Kansas 7–6)
- (6:53) KU: Austin Alexander 28-yard fumble return (Laith Marjan kick). Kansas 14-6
- (2:13) KU: Jalon Daniels 1-yard run (Laith Marjan kick). (Drive: 6 plays, 53 yards, 2:33; Kansas 21–6)

Second quarter

- (10:10) MIZ: Kevin Coleman Jr. 3-yard pass from Beau Pribula (Robert Meyer kick). (Drive: 15 plays, 75 yards, 7:03; Kansas 21–13)
- (9:49) MIZ: Team Safety. Kansas 21-15
- (1:03) MIZ: Robert Meyer 25-yard field goal. (Drive: 17 plays, 63 yards, 8:40; Kansas 21–18)
- (0:00) MIZ: Robert Meyer 20-yard field goal. (Drive: 4 plays, 84 yards, 0:28; Tied 21-21)

Third quarter

- (5:48) KU: Laith Marjan 28-yard field goal. (Drive: 11 plays, 53 yards, 4:29; Kansas 24–21)
- (0:24) MIZ: Brett Norfleet 11-yard pass from Beau Pribula (Robert Meyer kick). (Drive: 12 plays, 75 yards, 5:24; Missouri 28–24)

Fourth quarter

- (8:45) KU: DeShawn Hanika 6-yard pass from Jalon Daniels (Laith Marjan kick). (Drive: 8 plays, 92 yards, 3:51; Kansas 31–28)
- (4:14) MIZ: Brett Norfleet 27-yard pass from Beau Pribula (Robert Meyer kick). (Drive: 10 plays, 75 yards, 4:31; Missouri 35–31)
- (1:49) MIZ: Jamal Roberts 63-yard run (Robert Meyer kick). (Drive: 3 plays, 75 yards, 0:56; Missouri 42–31)

Statistics	KU	MIZ
First downs	13	28
Plays–yards	49–226	86–595
Rushes–yards	19–3	47–261
Passing yards	223	334
Passing: comp–att–int	18–30–1	30–39–0
Turnovers	1	1
Time of possession	19:33	40:27

Team	Category	Player	Statistics
Kansas	Passing	Jalon Daniels	18/30, 223 yards, 2 TD, INT
Kansas	Rushing	Jalon Daniels	10 carries, 17 yards, TD
Kansas	Receiving	Deshawn Hanika	6 receptions, 74 yards, 2 TD
Missouri	Passing	Beau Pribula	30/39, 334 yards, 3 TD
Missouri	Rushing	Jamal Roberts	13 carries, 143 yards, TD
Missouri	Receiving	Kevin Coleman Jr.	10 receptions, 126 yards, TD

=== Louisiana ===
Uniform Combination
Helmet (Oval Tiger)	Jersey	Pants

Game Three - Louisiana Ragin' Cajuns (1–1) at No. 25 Missouri Tigers (2–0) – Game summary

Quarter	1	2	3	4	Total
Ragin' Cajuns	0	10	0	0	10
No. 25 Tigers	14	24	7	7	52

at Faurot Field • Columbia, Missouri

- Date: September 13
- Game time: 12:00 p.m. CDT
- Game weather: Sunny, 91 degrees, 10 mph WSW
- Game attendance: 57,321
- Referee: David Smith
- TV announcers (SECN+/ESPN+): Jay Alter (play-by-play), Rocky Boiman (analyst), and Tori Petry (sideline)

Game information

First quarter

- (8:26) MIZ: Ahmad Hardy 7-yard run (Robert Meyer kick). (Drive: 10 plays, 73 yards, 5:17; Missouri 7–0)
- (2:38) MIZ: Marquis Johnson 11-yard pass from Beau Pribula (Robert Meyer kick). (Drive: 8 plays, 60 yards, 4:30; Missouri 14–0)

Second quarter

- (14:18) MIZ: Beau Pribula 14-yard run (Robert Meyer kick). (Drive: 4 plays, 59 yards, 1:21; Missouri 21–0)
- (10:31) MIZ: Jamal Roberts 39-yard pass from Beau Pribula (Robert Meyer kick). (Drive: 5 plays, 74 yards, 2:04; Missouri 28–0)
- (6:22) LA: Tony Sterner 34-yard field goal. (Drive: 4 plays, 5 yards, 1:59; Missouri 28–3)
- (5:41) MIZ: Ahmad Hardy 71-yard run (Robert Meyer kick). (Drive: 2 plays, 75 yards, 0:34; Missouri 35–3)
- (3:27) LA: Zylan Perry 84-yard run (Tony Sterner kick). (Drive: 1 play, 84 yards, 0:14; Missouri 35–10)
- (0:00) MIZ: Robert Meyer 22-yard field goal. (Drive: 14 plays, 71 yards, 3:27; Missouri 38–10)

Third quarter

- (10:02) MIZ: Ahmad Hardy 7-yard run (Robert Meyer kick). (Drive: 10 plays, 75 yards, 4:58; Missouri 45–10)

Fourth quarter

- (7:02) MIZ: Marquise Davis 2-yard run (Robert Meyer kick). (Drive: 17 plays, 73 yards, 10:43; Missouri 52–10)

Statistics	LA	MIZ
First downs	4	32
Plays–yards	36–121	86–606
Rushes–yards	22–117	62–427
Passing yards	4	179
Passing: comp–att–int	2–14–0	17–24–1
Turnovers	0	1
Time of possession	17:09	42:51

Team	Category	Player	Statistics
Louisiana	Passing	Daniel Beale	1/8, 5 yards
Louisiana	Rushing	Zylan Perry	5 carries, 86 yards, TD
Louisiana	Receiving	Caden Jensen	1 reception, 5 yards
Missouri	Passing	Beau Pribula	15/22, 174 yards, 2 TD, INT
Missouri	Rushing	Ahmad Hardy	22 carries, 250 yards, 3 TD
Missouri	Receiving	Kevin Coleman Jr.	8 receptions, 84 yards

=== South Carolina ===
Uniform Combination
Helmet (Block M)	Jersey	Pants

Game Four - South Carolina Gamecocks (2–1) at No. 23 Missouri Tigers (3–0) – Game summary

Quarter	1	2	3	4	Total
Gamecocks	0	14	6	0	20
No. 23 Tigers	0	12	6	11	29

at Faurot Field • Columbia, MO

- Date: September 20
- Game time: 6:00 pm CDT
- Game weather: Mostly sunny, 83 degrees, 7 mph SSW
- Game attendance: 57,321
- Referee: Ken Williamson
- TV announcers (ESPN): Dave Pasch (play-by-play), Dusty Dvoracek (analyst), and Taylor McGregor (sideline)

Game information

First quarter

No scoring plays

Second quarter

- MIZ – Joshua Manning 8-yard pass from Beau Pribula (Robert Meyer PAT failed), 14:24. Tigers 6–0. Drive: 9 plays, 99 yards, 4:38.
- SC – Vandrevius Jacobs 49-yard pass from LaNorris Sellers (William Joyce kick), 11:26. Gamecocks 7–6. Drive: 6 plays, 67 yards, 2:52.
- MIZ – Robert Meyer 23-yard field goal, 5:54. Tigers 9–7. Drive: 11 plays, 60 yards, 5:32.
- SC – Brian Rowe Jr. 24-yard pass from LaNorris Sellers (William Joyce kick), 2:31. Gamecocks 14–9. Drive: 4 plays, 70 yards, 1:15.
- MIZ – Robert Meyer 22-yard field goal, 0:17. Gamecocks 14–12. Drive: 11 plays, 71 yards, 2:14.

Third quarter

- SC – William Joyce 32-yard field goal, 8:27. Gamecocks 17–12. Drive: 8 plays, 49 yards, 4:23.
- MIZ – Ahmad Hardy 5-yard run (run failed), 5:34. Tigers 18–17. Drive: 6 plays, 75 yards, 2:53.
- SC – William Joyce 36-yard field goal, 0:18. Gamecocks 20–18. Drive: 9 plays, 56 yards, 5:10.

Fourth quarter

- MIZ – Jamal Roberts 16-yard run (Beau Pribula run), 9:32. Tigers 26–20. Drive: 10 plays, 75 yards, 5:46.
- MIZ – Robert Meyer 40-yard field goal, 1:34. Tigers 29–20. Drive: 10 plays, 57 yards, 3:29.

Statistics	SCAR	MIZ
First downs	15	29
Plays–yards	50–293	75–456
Rushes–yards	22–(-9)	48–285
Passing yards	302	171
Passing: comp–att–int	18–28–0	16–27–1
Turnovers	0	1
Time of possession	24:43	35:17

Team	Category	Player	Statistics
South Carolina	Passing	LaNorris Sellers	18/28, 302 yards, 2 TD
South Carolina	Rushing	Oscar Adaway III	3 carries, 7 yards
South Carolina	Receiving	Vandrevius Jacobs	7 receptions, 128 yards, TD
Missouri	Passing	Beau Pribula	16/27, 171 yards, TD, INT
Missouri	Rushing	Ahmad Hardy	22 carries, 138 yards, TD
Missouri	Receiving	Marquis Johnson	7 receptions, 80 yards

=== UMass ===
Uniform Combination
Helmet (Script "Missouri")	Jersey	Pants

Game Five - UMass Minutemen (0–3) at No. 20 Missouri Tigers (4–0) – Game summary

Quarter	1	2	3	4	Total
Minutemen	6	0	0	0	6
No. 20 Tigers	14	7	14	7	42

at Faurot Field • Columbia, MO

- Date: September 27
- Game time: 6:30 pm CDT
- Game weather: Sunny, 81 degrees, 4 mph W
- Game attendance: 57,321
- Referee: Steve Marlowe
- TV announcers (ESPNU): Courtney Lyle (play-by-play) and Rene Ingoglia (analyst)

Game information

First quarter

- (10:12) MIZ: Jamal Roberts 9-yard run (Robert Meyer Kick). (Drive: 7 plays, 68 yards, 3:24; Missouri 7–0)
- (4:31) MASS: Max Dowling 2-yard pass from AJ Hairston (Derek Morris kick BLOCKED). (Drive: 6 plays, 21 yards, 1:53; Missouri 7–6)
- (0:35) MIZ: Ahmad Hardy 5-yard run (Robert Meyer Kick). (Drive: 8 plays, 56 yards, 3:47; Missouri 14–6)

Second quarter

- (4:45) MIZ: Ahmad Hardy 1-yard run (Robert Meyer Kick). (Drive: 14 plays, 89 yards, 7:31; Missouri 21–6)

Third quarter

- (11:33) MIZ: Ahmad Hardy 16-yard run (Robert Meyer Kick). (Drive: 7 plays, 66 yards, 3:27; Missouri 28–6)
- (0:56) MIZ: Brett Norfleet 9-yard pass from Beau Pribula (Robert Meyer Kick). (Drive: 2 plays, 8 yards, 0:38; Missouri 35–6)

Fourth quarter

- (13:09) MIZ: Tavorus Jones 3-yard run (Robert Meyer Kick). (Drive: 5 plays, 37 yards, 2:11; Missouri 42–6)

Statistics	MASS	MIZ
First downs	9	31
Plays–yards	55–124	84–521
Rushes–yards	16–19	52–268
Passing yards	105	253
Passing: comp–att–int	14–39–1	27–32–1
Turnovers	1	1
Time of possession	21:17	38:43

Team	Category	Player	Statistics
Massachusetts	Passing	AJ Hairston	11/31, 75 yards, TD, INT
Massachusetts	Rushing	Rocko Griffin	5 carries, 23 yards
Massachusetts	Receiving	Jacquon Gibson	6 receptions, 30 yards
Missouri	Passing	Beau Pribula	26/29, 241 yards, TD, INT
Missouri	Rushing	Ahmad Hardy	24 carries, 130 yards, 3 TD
Missouri	Receiving	Kevin Coleman Jr.	12 receptions, 108 yards

=== No. 8 Alabama ===
Uniform Combination
Helmet (Block M)	Jersey	Pants

Game Six - No. 8 Alabama Crimson Tide (4-1) at No. 14 Missouri Tigers (5-0) – Game summary

Quarter	1	2	3	4	Total
No. 8 Crimson Tide	7	10	3	7	27
No. 14 Tigers	7	3	7	7	24

at Faurot Field • Columbia, MO

- Date: October 11
- Game time: 11:00 a.m. CDT
- Game weather: Sunny, 66 °F (19 °C); Wind: E 4 mph
- Game attendance: 57,321
- Referee: Jason Autrey
- TV announcers (ABC): Joe Tessitore (play-by-play), Jesse Palmer (analyst), and Katie George (sideline)

Game information

First quarter

- (12:10) MIZ – Brett Norfleet 26-yard pass from Beau Pribula, Robert Meyer kick (Drive: 6 plays, 78 yards, 2:43; Missouri 7–0)
- (6:05) ALA – Kevin Riley 6-yard pass from Ty Simpson, Conor Talty kick (Drive: 11 plays, 78 yards, 5:58; Tied 7–7)

Second quarter

- (14:51) ALA – Isaiah Horton 16-yard pass from Ty Simpson, Conor Talty kick (Drive: 10 plays, 67 yards, 4:48; Alabama 14–7)
- (7:10) ALA – Conor Talty 46-yard field goal (Drive: 9 plays, 40 yards, 4:47; Alabama 17–7)
- (0:00) MIZ – Robert Meyer 35-yard field goal (Drive: 10 plays, 57 yards, 3:32; Alabama 17–10)

Third quarter

- (13:18) MIZ – Beau Pribula 5-yard run, Robert Meyer kick (Drive: 3 plays, 19 yards, 1:2;7 Tied 17–17)
- (0:09) ALA – Conor Talty 22-yard field goal (Drive: 17 plays, 66 yards, 9:00; Alabama 20–17)

Fourth quarter

- (3:16) ALA – Daniel Hill 1-yard pass from Ty Simpson, Conor Talty kick (Drive: 8 plays, 40 yards, 3:46; Alabama 27–17)
- (1:39) MIZ – Donovan Olugbode 3-yard pass from Beau Pribula, Robert Meyer kick (Drive: 7 plays, 75 yards, 1:37; Alabama 27–24)

Statistics	ALA	MIZ
First downs	22	15
Plays–yards	75–325	56–330
Rushes–yards	44–125	28–163
Passing yards	200	167
Passing: comp–att–int	23–31–0	16–28–2
Turnovers	1	2
Time of possession	38:33	21:27

Team	Category	Player	Statistics
Alabama	Passing	Ty Simpson	23/31, 200 yards, 3 TD
Alabama	Rushing	Jam Miller	20 carries, 85 yards
Alabama	Receiving	Lotzeir Brooks	4 receptions, 58 yards
Missouri	Passing	Beau Pribula	16/28, 167 yards, 2 TD, 2 INT
Missouri	Rushing	Beau Pribula	11 carries, 61 yards, TD
Missouri	Receiving	Donovan Olugbode	3 receptions, 55 yards, TD

=== at Auburn ===
Uniform Combination
Helmet (Oval Tiger)	Jersey	Pants

Game Seven - No. 16 Missouri Tigers (5–1) at Auburn Tigers (3–3) – Game summary

Quarter	1	2	3	4	OT	2OT	Total
No. 16 Missouri	3	7	0	7	0	6	23
Auburn	7	0	7	3	0	0	17

at Jordan-Hare Stadium • Auburn, AL

- Date: October 18
- Game time: 6:45 p.m. CDT
- Game weather: Sunny • Temperature: 73 °F (23 °C) • Wind: SE 7 mph
- Game attendance: 88,043
- Referee: Kyle Olson
- TV announcers (SECN): Tom Hart (play-by-play), Jordan Rodgers (analyst), and Cole Cubelic (sideline)

Game information

First quarter

- AUB – Jackson Arnold 1-yard run (Alex McPherson kick), 9:54. Auburn 7–0. Drive: 12 plays, 75 yards, 5:06.
- MIZ – Robert Meyer 24–yard field goal, 1:44. Auburn 7–3. Drive: 10 plays, 24 yards, 5:05.

Second quarter

- MIZ – Ahmad Hardy 2-yard run (Robert Meyer kick), 10:21. Missouri 10–7. Drive: 9 plays, 65 yards, 4:48.

Third quarter

- AUB – Omar Mabson II 1-yard run (Alex McPherson kick), 0:35. Auburn 14–10. Drive: 12 plays, 86 yards, 4:58.

Fourth quarter

- AUB – Alex McPherson 22-yard field goal, 10:31. Auburn 17–10. Drive: 8 plays, 73 yards, 3:52.
- MIZ - Ahmad Hardy 3-yard run (Robert Meyer kick), 5:07. Tied 17–17. Drive: 5 plays, 60 yards, 1:09.

First overtime

- No scoring plays.

Second overtime

- MIZ – Beau Pribula 3-yard run (Kevin Coleman Jr. pass from Beau Pribula failed). Missouri 23–17. Drive: 7 plays, 25 yards.

Statistics	MIZ	AUB
First downs	26	19
Plays–yards	84–343	71–357
Rushes–yards	44–91	41–150
Passing yards	252	207
Passing: comp–att–int	23–40–2	18–30–1
Turnovers	2	1
Time of possession	32:47	27:13

Team	Category	Player	Statistics
Missouri	Passing	Beau Pribula	23/40, 252 yards, 2 INT
Missouri	Rushing	Ahmad Hardy	24 carries, 58 yards, 2 TD
Missouri	Receiving	Donovan Olugbode	5 receptions, 69 yards
Auburn	Passing	Jackson Arnold	18/30, 207 yards, INT
Auburn	Rushing	Jeremiah Cobb	19 carries, 111 yards
Auburn	Receiving	Cam Coleman	6 receptions, 108 yards

=== at No. 10 Vanderbilt ===
Uniform Combination
Helmet (Oval Tiger)	Jersey	Pants

Game Eight - No. 15 Missouri Tigers (6–1) at No. 10 Vanderbilt Commodores (6–1) – Game summary

Quarter	1	2	3	4	Total
No. 15 Tigers	0	3	0	7	10
No. 10 Commodores	0	3	7	7	17

at FirstBank Stadium • Nashville, TN

- Date: October 25
- Game time: 2:30 p.m. CDT
- Game weather: Sunny • Temperature: 71 °F (22 °C)
- Game attendance: 35,000
- Referee: Steve Marlowe
- TV announcers (ESPN): Bob Wischusen (play-by-play), Louis Riddick (analyst), and Kris Budden (sideline)

Game information

First quarter

No scoring plays

Second quarter

- (5:11) MIZ – Robert Meyer 39-yard field goal (Drive: 13 plays, 69 yards, 7:48; Missouri 3–0)
- (2:00) VAN – Brock Taylor 38-yard field goal (Drive: 8 plays, 55 yards, 3:06; Tied 3–3)

Third quarter

- (3:51) VAN – Makhilyn Young 80-yard run, Brock Taylor kick (Drive: 1 play, 80 yards, 0:13; Vanderbilt 10–3)

Fourth quarter

- (12:49) MIZ – Jude James 6-yard pass from Matt Zollers, Robert Meyer kick (Drive: 12 plays, 75 yards, 6:02; Tied 10–10)
- (1:52) VAN – Diego Pavia 1-yard run, Brock Taylor kick (Drive: 9 plays, 44 yards, 5:10; Vanderbilt 17–10)

Statistics	MIZ	VAN
First downs	22	13
Plays–yards	78–376	45–265
Rushes–yards	41–170	26–136
Passing yards	206	129
Passing: comp–att–int	23–37–0	10–19–1
Turnovers	1	1
Time of possession	36:12	23:48

Team	Category	Player	Statistics
Missouri	Passing	Matt Zollers	14/23, 138 yards, TD
Missouri	Rushing	Ahmad Hardy	20 carries, 97 yards
Missouri	Receiving	Kevin Coleman Jr.	7 receptions, 109 yards
Vanderbilt	Passing	Diego Pavia	10/19, 129 yards, INT
Vanderbilt	Rushing	Makhilyn Young	4 carries, 86 yards, TD
Vanderbilt	Receiving	Tre Richardson	4 receptions, 62 yards

=== No. 3 Texas A&M ===
Uniform Combination
Helmet (Oval Tiger)	Jersey	Pants

Game Nine - No. 3 Texas A&M Aggies (8–0) at No. 22 Missouri Tigers (6–2) – Game summary

Quarter	1	2	3	4	Total
No. 3 Aggies	7	7	10	14	38
No. 22 Tigers	0	0	7	10	17

at Faurot Field • Columbia, MO

- Date: November 8
- Game time: 2:30 p.m. CST
- Game weather: Cloudy, 59°, Wind, S 5mph
- Game attendance: 57,321
- Referee: Jeff Heaser
- TV announcers (ABC): Joe Tessitore (play-by-play), Jesse Palmer (analyst), and Katie George (sideline)

Game information

First quarter

- TA&M – Ashton Bethel-Roman 4-yard pass from Marcel Reed (Randy Bond kick), 1:16. Aggies 7–0. Drive: 9 plays, 59 yards, 4:37.

Second quarter

- TA&M – EJ Smith 1-yard run (Randy Bond kick), 0:20. Aggies 14–0. Drive: 2 plays, 2 yards, 0:37.

Third quarter

- TA&M – KC Concepcion 48-yard pass from Marcel Reed (Randy Bond kick), 11:21. Aggies 21–0. Drive: 4 plays, 68 yards, 1:36.
- MIZ – Jamal Roberts 4-yard run (Robert Meyer kick), 6:50. Aggies 21–7. Drive: 8 plays, 40 yards, 4:20.
- TA&M – Randy Bond 32-yard field goal, 3:10. Aggies 24–7. Drive: 8 plays, 59 yards, 3:34.

Fourth quarter

- MIZ – Oliver Robbins 49-yard field goal, 11:17. Aggies 24–10. Drive: 10 plays, 52 yards, 3:34.
- TA&M – Rueben Owens II 57-yard run (Randy Bond kick), 7:40. Aggies 31–10. Drive: 6 plays, 76 yards, 3:29.
- MIZ – Ahmad Hardy 45-yard run (Robert Meyer kick), 6:45. Aggies 31–17. Drive: 4 plays, 71 yards, 0:49.
- TA&M – Rueben Owens II 1-yard run (Randy Bond kick), 2:36. Aggies 38–17. Drive: 7 plays, 65 yards, 4:08.

Statistics	TA&M	MIZ
First downs	21	17
Plays–yards	68–464	56–284
Rushes–yards	39–243	34–207
Passing yards	221	77
Passing: comp–att–int	20–29–0	7–22–0
Turnovers	1	2
Time of possession	35:44	24:16

Team	Category	Player	Statistics
Texas A&M	Passing	Marcel Reed	20/29, 221 yards, 2 TD
Texas A&M	Rushing	Rueben Owens II	13 carries, 102 yards, 2 TD
Texas A&M	Receiving	KC Concepcion	4 receptions, 84 yards, TD
Missouri	Passing	Matt Zollers	7/22, 77 yards
Missouri	Rushing	Jamal Roberts	17 carries, 110 yards, TD
Missouri	Receiving	Donovan Olugbode	3 receptions, 74 yards

=== Mississippi State ===
Uniform Combination
Helmet (Block M)	Jersey	Pants

Game Ten – Mississippi State Bulldogs (5–5) at Missouri Tigers (6–3) – Game summary

Quarter	1	2	3	4	Total
Bulldogs	10	0	14	3	27
Tigers	14	7	14	14	49

at Faurot Field • Columbia, MO

- Date: November 15
- Game time: 6:45 p.m. CST
- Game weather:
- Game attendance: 57,321
- Referee: Lee Hedrick
- TV announcers (SECN): Tom Hart (play-by-play), Jordan Rodgers (analyst), and Cole Cubelic (sideline)

Game information

First quarter

- MIZ – Donovan Olugbode 26-yard pass from Matt Zollers (Robert Meyer kick), 11:29. Tigers 7–0. Drive: 5 plays, 65 yards, 1:56.
- MSST – Kyle Ferrie 47-yard field goal, 6:28. Tigers 7–3. Drive: 9 plays, 51 yards, 4:54.
- MIZ – Joshua Manning 34-yard pass from Matt Zollers (Robert Meyer kick), 4:52. Tigers 14–3. Drive: 4 plays, 75 yards, 1:36.
- MSST – Blake Shapen 2-yard run (Kyle Ferrie kick), 0:00. Tigers 14–10. Drive: 9 plays, 75 yards, 4:52.

Second quarter

- MIZ – Ahmad Hardy 10-yard run (Robert Meyer kick), 2:36. Tigers 21–10. Drive: 5 plays, 23 yards, 2:17.

Third quarter

- MSST – Blake Shapen 3-yard run (Kyle Ferrie kick), 10:28. Tigers 21–17. Drive: 10 plays, 52 yards, 3:20.
- MIZ – Ahmad Hardy 72-yard run (Robert Meyer kick), 5:56. Tigers 28–17. Drive: 2 plays, 76 yards, 0:41.
- MIZ – Toriano Pride Jr. 19-yard interception return (Robert Meyer kick), 5:47. Tigers 35–17.
- MSST – Seydou Traore 3-yard pass from Kamario Taylor (Kyle Ferrie kick), 2:47. Tigers 35–24. Drive: 9 plays, 80 yards, 2:56.

Fourth quarter

- MIZ – Marvin Burks Jr. 28-yard interception return (Robert Meyer kick), 13:09. Tigers 42–24.
- MIZ – Ahmad Hardy 43-yard run (Robert Meyer kick), 11:11. Tigers 49–24. Drive: 1 play, 43 yards, 0:10.
- MSST – Kyle Ferrie 41-yard field goal, 5:19. Tigers 49–27. Drive: 15 plays, 61 yards, 5:51.

Statistics	MSST	MIZ
First downs	27	17
Plays–yards	90–345	55–438
Rushes–yards	52–110	39–326
Passing yards	235	112
Passing: comp–att–int	23–38–2	8–16–1
Turnovers	3	2
Time of possession	36:42	23:18

Team	Category	Player	Statistics
Mississippi State	Passing	Blake Shapen	19/33, 199 yards, 2 INT
Mississippi State	Rushing	Davon Booth	10 carries, 34 yards
Mississippi State	Receiving	Anthony Evans III	7 receptions, 71 yards
Missouri	Passing	Matt Zollers	8/15, 112 yards, 2 TD, INT
Missouri	Rushing	Ahmad Hardy	25 carries, 300 yards, 3 TD
Missouri	Receiving	Kevin Coleman Jr.	4 receptions, 41 yards

=== at No. 8 Oklahoma (rivalry) ===
Uniform Combination
Helmet (Block M)	Jersey	Pants

Game Eleven – No. 22 Missouri Tigers (7–3) at No. 8 Oklahoma Sooners (8–2) – Game summary

Quarter	1	2	3	4	Total
No. 22 Tigers	3	3	0	0	6
No. 8 Sooners	0	14	3	0	17

at Gaylord Family Oklahoma Memorial Stadium • Norman, OK

- Date: November 22
- Game time: 11:00 a.m. CST
- Game weather: Cloudy • Temperature: 49 °F (9 °C) • Wind: NW at 9 miles per hour (14 km/h)
- Game attendance: 83,541
- Referee: David Smith
- TV announcers (ABC): Sean McDonough (play-by-play), Greg McElroy (analyst), and Molly McGrath (sideline)

Game information

First quarter

- (6:37) MIZ – Robert Meyer 39-yard field goal (Drive: 14 plays, 54 yards, 8:23; MIZ 3–0)

Second quarter

- (6:45) OU – Isaiah Sategna III 87-yard pass from John Mateer, Tate Sandell kick (Drive: 3 plays, 90 yards, 0:52; OU 7–3)
- (2:22) OU – Javonnie Gibson 8-yard pass from John Mateer, Tate Sandell kick (Drive: 7 plays, 35 yards, 2:22; OU 14–3)
- (0:17) MIZ – Robert Meyer 21-yard field goal (Drive: 10 plays, 77 yards, 2:02; OU 14–6)

Third quarter

- (11:36) OU – Tate Sandell-45 yard field goal (Drive: 8 plays, 47 yards, 3:24; OU 17–6)

Fourth quarter

- No scoring plays.

Statistics	MIZ	OU
First downs	19	14
Plays–yards	71–301	62–276
Rushes–yards	35–70	32–103
Passing yards	231	173
Passing: comp–att–int	20–36–2	14–30–0
Turnovers	2	0
Time of possession	32:48	27:12

Team	Category	Player	Statistics
Missouri	Passing	Beau Pribula	20/36, 231 yards, 2 INT
Missouri	Rushing	Ahmad Hardy	17 carries, 57 yards
Missouri	Receiving	Kevin Coleman Jr.	7 receptions, 115 yards
Oklahoma	Passing	John Mateer	14/30, 173 yards, 2 TD
Oklahoma	Rushing	John Mateer	18 carries, 60 yards
Oklahoma	Receiving	Xavier Robinson	4 receptions, 16 yards

=== at Arkansas (Battle Line Rivalry) ===
Uniform Combination
Helmet (Block M)	Jersey	Pants

Game Twelve – Missouri Tigers (7–4) at Arkansas Razorbacks (2–9) – Game summary

Quarter	1	2	3	4	Total
Tigers	7	7	6	11	31
Razorbacks	7	10	0	0	17

at Donald W. Reynolds Razorback Stadium • Fayetteville, AR

- Date: November 29
- Game time: 2:30 p.m. CST
- Game weather:
- Game attendance: 61,508
- Referee: Daniel Gautreaux
- TV announcers (SECN): Dave Neal (play-by-play), Fozzy Whittaker (analyst) and Morgan Uber (sideline)

Game information

First quarter

- MIZ – Jamal Roberts 4-yard run (Oliver Robbins kick), 13:25. Tigers 7–0. Drive: 3 plays, 58 yards, 1:27.
- ARK – O'Mega Blake 16-yard pass from KJ Jackson (Scott Starzyk kick), 2:20. Tied 7–7. Drive: 12 plays, 73 yards, 4:52.

Second quarter

- ARK – Bradley Shaw 32-yard fumble return (Scott Starzyk kick), 14:12. Razorbacks 14–7.
- MIZ – Beau Pribula 11-yard run (Oliver Robbins kick), 9:33. Tied 14–14. Drive: 9 plays, 75 yards, 4:39.
- ARK – Scott Starzyk 28-yard field goal, 0:11. Razorbacks 17–14. Drive: 6 plays, 12 yards, 1:04.

Third quarter

- MIZ – Ahmad Hardy 53-yard run (pass failed), 11:57. Tigers 20–17. Drive: 4 plays, 62 yards, 1:30.

Fourth quarter

- MIZ – Oliver Robbins 41-yard field goal, 9:56. Tigers 23–17. Drive: 12 plays, 61 yards, 6:41.
- MIZ – Kevin Coleman Jr. 67-yard punt return (Jamal Roberts run), 8:07. Tigers 31–17.

Statistics	MIZ	ARK
First downs	26	15
Plays–yards	65–347	42–246
Rushes–yards	58–322	25–61
Passing yards	25	185
Passing: comp–att–int	4–7–0	17–30–0
Turnovers	1	0
Time of possession	34:03	25:57

Team	Category	Player	Statistics
Missouri	Passing	Beau Pribula	4/7, 25 yards
Missouri	Rushing	Ahmad Hardy	27 carries, 157 yards, TD
Missouri	Receiving	Brett Norfleet	2 receptions, 13 yards
Arkansas	Passing	KJ Jackson	11/17, 126 yards, TD
Arkansas	Rushing	Mike Washington Jr.	11 carries, 50 yards
Arkansas	Receiving	O'Mega Blake	4 receptions, 53 yards, TD

=== vs. No. 19 Virginia (Gator Bowl) ===
2025 TaxSlayer Gator Bowl
No. 19 Virginia Cavaliers (10-3) vs. Missouri Tigers (8-4) – Game summary

Quarter	1	2	3	4	Total
No. 19 Cavaliers	0	3	10	0	13
Tigers	7	0	0	0	7

at EverBank Stadium • Jacksonville, FL

- Date: December 27
- Game time: 6:30 p.m. CDT
- Game weather:
- Game attendance: 31,802
- TV announcers (ABC): Bob Wischusen (play-by-play), Louis Riddick (analyst) and Kris Budden (sideline)

Game information

First quarter

- MIZ – Jamal Roberts 5-yard run (Jayven Richardson kick), 11:56. Tigers 7–0. Drive: 7 plays, 74 yards, 3:00.

Second quarter

- UVA – Will Bettridge 42-yard field goal, 12:17. Tigers 7–3. Drive: 12 plays, 42 yards, 5:50.

Third quarter

- UVA – Harrison Waylee 2-yard run (Will Bettridge kick), 4:53. Cavaliers 10–7. Drive: 19 plays, 75 yards, 10:07.
- UVA – Will Bettridge 39-yard field goal, 1:00. Cavaliers 13–7. Drive: 7 plays, 14 yards, 3:03.

Fourth quarter

- No scoring plays.

Statistics	UVA	MIZ
First downs	18	13
Plays–yards	79–308	55–260
Rushes–yards	41–110	32–159
Passing yards	198	101
Passing: comp–att–int	25–38–0	12–23–1
Turnovers	1	1
Time of possession	38:34	21:26

Team	Category	Player	Statistics
Virginia	Passing	Chandler Morris	25/38, 198 yards
Virginia	Rushing	Harrison Waylee	20 carries, 68 yards, TD
Virginia	Receiving	Eli Wood IV	4 catches, 71 yards
Missouri	Passing	Matt Zollers	12/22, 101 yards, INT
Missouri	Rushing	Ahmad Hardy	15 carries, 89 yards
Missouri	Receiving	Donovan Olugbode	5 catches, 49 yards

== Coaching staff ==
Name	Position	Seasons at Missouri	Alma mater
Eliah Drinkwitz	Head Coach	7	Arkansas Tech (2004)
Al Pogue	Cornerbacks	5	Alabama State (1996)
Kirby Moore	Offensive coordinator/ Quarterbacks	3	Boise State (2013)
Corey Batoon	Defensive coordinator/safeties	3	Long Beach State (1991)
Erik Link	Special teams coordinator	6	Drake (2003)
David Blackwell	Defensive line (Interior)	3	East Carolina (1997)
Derek Nicholson	Linebackers and co-defensive coordinator	1	Florida State (2009)
Jacob Peeler	Wide receivers	4	Louisiana Tech (2007)
Brandon Jones	Offensive line	3	Texas Tech (2007)
Curtis Luper	Running backs	6	Stephen F. Austin (1996)
Brian Early	Defensive line (Edge)	2	University of Arkansas at Monticello (1994)
Chris Ball	Defensive analyst	2	Missouri Western State (1987)

== Personnel ==
2025 Missouri Tigers football team roster
Players
Coaches
Offense

Pos.	#	Name	Class
WR	0	Joshua Manning	Jr
WR	1	Donovan Olugbode	Fr
WR	2	Marquis Johnson	Jr
WR	3	Kevin Coleman Jr.	Sr
WR	4	James Madison II	Fr
QB	5	Matt Zollers	Fr
WR	6	Xavier Loyd	GS
RB	7	Marquise Davis	Fr
WR	8	Shaun Terry II	Fr
QB	9	Beau Pribula	GS
WR	10	Daniel Blood	Jr
WR	11	DaMarion Fowlkes	Fr
TE	12	Vince Brown II	Sr
QB	14	Brett Brown	Jr
QB	15	Tommy Lock	GS
RB	16	Brendon Haygood	Fr
QB	18	Essien Smith	Fr
RB	20	Jamal Roberts	So
QB	21	Sam Horn	Jr
RB	22	Tavorus Jones	Jr
RB	29	Ahmad Hardy	So
RB	31	Anthony Favrow	Sr
WR	32	Gavin Wyatt	Jr
WR	39	Cameron Pitts	Fr
OL	50	Jaylen Early	Sr
OL	54	Henry Fenuku	Fr
OL	55	Connor Tollison	GS
OL	56	Dominick Giudice	GS
OL	60	Johnny Williams IV	So
OL	63	Chace Missouri	So
OL	64	Joe Schranz	Fr
OL	65	Henry McDermott	Sr
OL	66	Logan Reichert	So
OL	68	Keiton Jones	Fr
OL	70	Cayden Green	Jr
OL	71	Ryan Jostes	Fr
OL	73	Tristan Wilson	Jr
TE	74	Whit Hafer	Fr
OL	75	Jayven Richardson	Jr
OL	76	Jack Lange	Fr
OL	77	Curtis Peagler	Jr
OL	78	Brandon Solis	So
OL	79	Keagen Trost	GS
WR	80	Jayden Bolton	Sr
WR	81	Noah Flaskamp	Jr
WR	82	Logan Muckey	GS
TE	84	Adam Molitor	So
TE	85	Dakotah Terrell	Fr
TE	86	Jordon Harris	Jr
TE	87	Brett Norfleet	Jr
TE	88	Gavin Hoffman	Fr
TE	89	Jude James	Fr

Defense

Pos.	#	Name	Class
CB	0	Stephen Hall	Sr
S	1	Marvin Burks Jr.	Jr
CB	2	Toriano Pride	Sr
S	3	Mose Phillips III	Jr
S	4	Caleb Flagg	Sr
LB	5	Khalil Jacobs	Sr
S	6	Jalen Catalon	GS
DT	7	Chris McClellan	Sr
DE	8	Damon Wilson II	Jr
DE	9	Zion Young	Sr
DT	10	Sterling Webb	Sr
DE	11	Langden Kitchen	Jr
CB	12	Dreyden Norwood	Sr
S	13	Daylan Carnell	GS
LB	14	Triston Newson	GS
S	15	Santana Banner	So
DE	16	Javion Hilson	Fr
LB	17	Brian Huff	Fr
LB	18	Jeremiah Beasley	So
DE	19	Darris Smith	Jr
LB	20	Nicholas Rodriguez	So
S	21	Trajen Greco	So
LB	22	Dante McClellan	Fr
CB	24	Nicholas Deloach Jr.	So
LB	25	Jason King	Fr
LB	26	Brady Hultman	Jr
CB	26	Shamar McNeil	So
CB	28	Mark Manfred	Fr
CB	29	Cameron Keys	Fr
S	30	CJ Bass III	Fr
CB	31	Nasir Pogue	Sr
S	32	Maddux Hermestroff	Fr
DT	33	Marquis Gracial	Jr
S	34	Jackson Hancock	Fr
LB	40	Josiah Trotter	So
S	41	Ricardo Merriweather	Jr
LB	46	Jackson Daily	So
LB	53	Tommy Reese	Jr
DT	55	Justin Bodford	Fr
DT	81	Bralen Henderson	GS
DE	90	Nate Johnson	Jr
DT	91	Elias Williams	Fr
DT	92	Jason Dowell	Fr
DE	93	Daeden Hopkins	Fr
DT	94	Sam Williams	So
DT	95	Jalen Marshall	Jr
DE	96	Aidan Dubbert	Jr
DT	99	Jadon Frick	So

Special teams

Pos.	#	Name	Class
K	19	Blake Craig	So
LS	36	Sean Gross	Fr
LS	38	Henry Crosby	Fr
P	43	John Butcher	Jr
P	45	Connor Weselman	GS
K	48	Oliver Robbins	So
LS	51	Brett Le Blanc	Jr
K	88	Robert Meyer	Fr
K	97	Ryder Goodwin	So

Head coach

- Eliah Drinkwitz

Coordinators/assistant coaches

- Corey Batoon –Defensive coordinator
- Erik Link – Special teams coordinator
- Kirby Moore – Offensive coordinator
- Al Pogue – Assistant head coach/cornerbacks
- David Blackwell – Defensive tackles
- Derham Cato – Tight ends
- Brian Early – Defensive linemen/edge rushers
- Sean Gleeson – Quarterbacks
- Brandon Jones – Offensive linemen
- Curtis Luper – Running backs
- Derek Nicholson – Linebackers
- Jacob Peeler – Wide receivers/recruiting coordinator
- Jacob Yoro – Safeties
- Jack Abercrombie – Offensive assistant
- Christopher Ball – Defensive assistant
- Andrew Belluomini – Offensive assistant
- Brendan Boylan – Offensive assistant
- Brian Hamilton – Defensive assistant
- Brandon Lewis – Defensive assistant
- Brock Olivo – Special teams assistant
- Keyan Williams – Offensive assistant
- Cally Chizik – Graduate assistant
- Bo Els – Graduate assistant

Legend

- (C) Team captain
- (S) Suspended
- (I) Ineligible
- Injured
- Redshirt

Roster
Last update: 9/5/25
