= Matt Zollers =

American football player (born 2006)

No. 5 – Missouri Tigers
- Position: Quarterback
- Class: Sophomore

Personal information
- Born: July 21, 2006 (age 20)
- Listed height: 6 ft 4 in (1.93 m)
- Listed weight: 215 lb (98 kg)

Career information
- High school: Spring-Ford (Royersford, Pennsylvania)
- College: Missouri (2025–present)
- Stats at ESPN

Matt Zollers (born July 21, 2006) is an American college football quarterback for the Missouri Tigers.

== Early life ==
Zollers lived in Royersford, Pennsylvania, and attended Spring-Ford High School, where he played basketball and football. He passed for 2,052 yards and 23 touchdowns during his sophomore season. As a junior, Zollers passed for a school-record 2,917 yards with 37 touchdowns and two interceptions. Following his junior year, he competed in the Elite 11 quarterback competition and was named a finalist. Zollers was selected to play in the 2025 All-American Bowl. He suffered a broken ankle in the third game of his senior year, ending his season. Zollers passed for 426 yards with one touchdown and three interceptions while also rushing for 221 yards and three touchdowns before the injury.

Matt Zollers was a consensus four-star recruit and the second-best prospect in Pennsylvania. Zollers, who was rated as a four-star recruit by On3, ESPN, and 247 Sports in the 2025 class, was ranked by On3 as the No. 99 overall recruit and the No. 10 quarterback. He was ranked slightly higher by ESPN, coming in as the No. 86 overall recruit and the No. 8 quarterback. 247 Sports rated him as the No. 87 overall recruit and the No. 9 quarterback. Zollers committed to play college football at Missouri over offers from Penn State, Pittsburgh, and Georgia.

== College career ==
=== 2025 ===
Zollers joined the Missouri Tigers as an early enrollee in January 2025. In the first game of the 2025 season against Central Arkansas, Zollers saw the field for one play in the first half in relief of Beau Pribula, as well as starting the fourth quarter after an injury to planned starter Sam Horn. Zollers went 3/3 for 58 yards and one touchdown in his college debut, a 61-6 Missouri win. Zollers received his first significant snaps following an injury to Pribula during a 10-17 loss to Vanderbilt, going 14/23 for 138 yards and one touchdown. After Pribula was ruled out for multiple contests following the Vanderbilt game, head coach Eliah Drinkwitz named Zollers the starting quarterback until Pribula's return, which occurred in Week 13 against Oklahoma.

The true freshman struggled in Missouri's next game, a 38–17 loss against Texas A&M, who was ranked #3 in the nation at the time, completing only 7 of 22 passes for 77 yards with zero touchdowns and zero interceptions. He bounced back the next week in Missouri's 49–27 win over Mississippi State, completing 8 of 15 passes for two touchdowns and one interception.

With Pribula transferring, Zollers started the Gator Bowl in a 13-7 loss to Virginia where Zollers threw for 101 yards and an interception.

=== Statistics ===
| Season | Team | Games | | | Passing | | | | | | | | Rushing | | | |
| Season | Team | GP | GS | Record | Comp | Att | Pct | Yards | Avg | TD | Int | Rate | Att | Yards | Avg | TD |
|---|---|---|---|---|---|---|---|---|---|---|---|---|---|---|---|---|
| 2025 | Missouri | 8 | 3 | 1–2 | 47 | 88 | 53.4 | 503 | 5.7 | 4 | 2 | 111.9 | 16 | -23 | -1.4 | 0 |
| Career | | 8 | 3 | 1–2 | 47 | 88 | 53.4 | 503 | 5.7 | 4 | 2 | 111.9 | 16 | -23 | -1.4 | 0 |

== Personal life ==
Zollers' older brother, Zach, is a defensive lineman for the Pittsburgh Panthers.
