= Tollison =

Tollison is a surname. Notable people with the surname include:

- Connor Tollison (born 2002), American football player
- Gray Tollison (born 1964), American politician
- Robert Tollison (1942–2016), American economist
