= St. Mary's South Side Catholic High School =

Catholic high school in St. Louis, Missouri, US

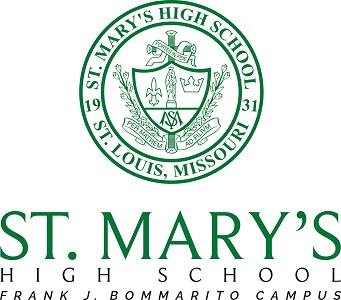

Location
- 4701 South Grand Boulevard; St. Louis, Missouri 63111; United States; 38°34′30″N 90°15′3″W

Information
- Former names: South Side Catholic High School (1931–1947); St. Mary's High School (1947–2023)
- Type: Private, all-boys
- Religious affiliation: Roman Catholic (Marianist)
- Established: 1931; 95 years ago
- President: Mike England
- Principal: Valerie Todd
- Grades: 9–12
- Colors: Green and white
- Athletics conference: Independent
- Nickname: Dragons
- Accreditation: Cognia
- Tuition: $10,200
- Alumni: 11,000+
- Website: stmaryshs.com

St. Mary's South Side Catholic High School is an independent Catholic, all-boys high school rooted in the Marianist tradition in St. Louis, Missouri. Founded in 1931 as South Side Catholic High School by at the Archdiocese of St. Louis, it became independent in 2023 as a new institution with its current name. It is situated on a 27-acre campus in the Dutchtown neighborhood.

== History ==
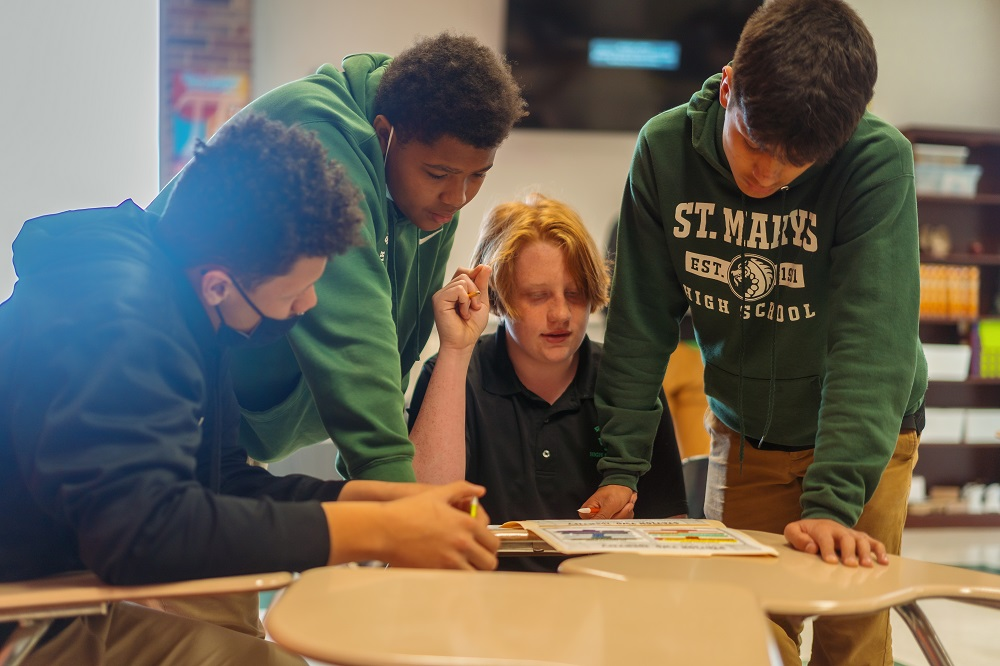
Students work together on a class assignment.

In September 1931, South Side Catholic High School opened with Christian Brothers teaching in two classrooms, small buildings on the premises of St. Joseph's Orphanage. Two years later ten Marianist Brothers were teaching 275 students. Beginning in 1935 the orphanage building was remodeled and became the school, from which 62 students graduated in 1936, the year the school received accreditation from the North Central Association of Colleges and Schools and from the University of Missouri. The school reached its peak enrollment of 1,100 students in 1946 and was renamed St. Mary's High School in 1947.

When a new, $1.5 million building was completed in 1964, there were 883 students in 19 classrooms, besides three laboratories for science and one for languages, a library, cafeteria, administrative offices, and rooms for 30 Marianists on the third floor. In 1967 a wing was added with rooms for teachers and for guidance, chemistry, biology and typing; and additional classrooms, four of which could be opened to form two rooms seating 110 each. An athletic complex was begun in 1988, with a grass field for football and soccer and an all-weather track. Lighting was added in 1992.

The original gymnasium of 1938 was destroyed by fire in 1993 and replaced with a new complex named for Archbishop John L. May. It included weight rooms, a batting cage, and an alumni meeting room. Computer facilities were added throughout the school in 1993, enhanced in 2004, and again in 2013, when each student was supplied with a notebook computer. In 1998 a chapel was received from Catholic Charities and refurbished to become Holy Family Chapel. In 2000, renovations included converting the Marianist quarters into a fine arts center and band room. The Archdiocese of St. Louis and the United States Province of the Society of Mary continue to sponsor the school, and 19 faculty members have become lay Marianists.

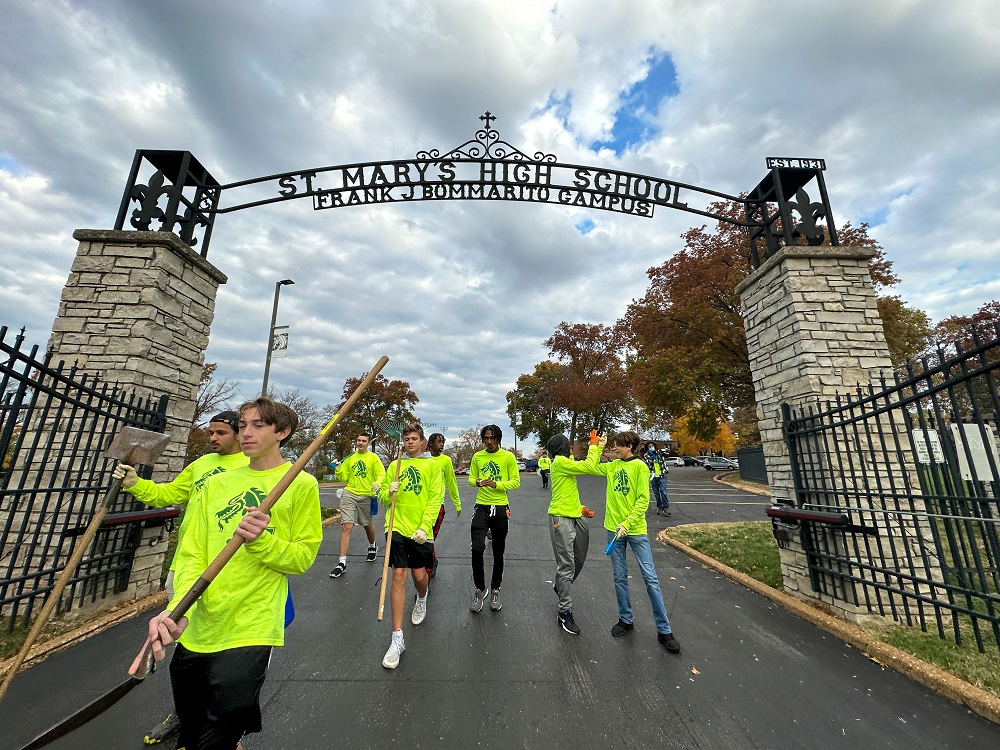
Student volunteers prepare for the annual Day of Service.

In 2008, property to the west of the school was purchased and a Center for Applied Science was added. It has grown to include electronics and robotics, computer programming, architecture, and graphic design. With the completion of a $5 million fund-raising drive, Divis Field for baseball was added, along with practice fields for soccer. In 2012, the courtyard was improved and memorial bricks added. Around this time, the campus was named the Frank Bommarito Campus after a donation from an alumnus of the class of 1951 who had become a successful automotive dealer. The football field received artificial turf and improved lighting in 2016.

In 2022, the Archdiocese of St. Louis announced that the school would be closing after the end of the 2022–2023 school year as part of its downsizing plan, citing a drop in enrollment to less than 250 students. Alumni and friends of St. Mary's quickly rallied to raise funds to save the school, citing its diverse student body and role as an anchor for the Dutchtown neighborhood as reasons why it should remain open. A three-year capital campaign called "The Work Is Ours" was launched to support St. Mary's future independence; within five months, it had already reached half of its $12 million goal.

On December 15, 2022, St. Mary's High School announced that a deal with the Archdiocese of St. Louis would keep the school open. The school agreed to the terms of a three-year lease with the Archdiocese of St. Louis, while the school officially changed its name to add South Side Catholic back as a gesture to its history and new independence. On July 14, 2025, St. Mary's South Side purchased the campus from the archdiocese. Since going independent the school has seen a growth in applications and established several new programs, including a vocational training program in partnership with local trade unions and serving as host of the St. Joseph Housing Initiative, which renovates (with help from St. Mary's students) and sells vacant homes in Dutchtown to working-class families.

== Athletics ==
St. Mary's athletic teams are known as the Dragons, and they participate in MSHSAA-sponsored sports. It was a longtime member of the Archdiocesan Athletic Association, a conference of St. Louis private high schools that disbanded in 2022.

From 2021–2022, St. Mary's won consecutive state championships in football, first in Class 3 and then in Class 4.

St. Mary's has won six state championships in soccer. With the first championship coming in 1969, they later won in 1995, 1999, 2000, 2001, and 2010.

== Notable people ==
=== Alumni ===
- John Berner, professional soccer player (Colorado Rapids), (Phoenix Rising FC)
- Yogi Berra, MLB Hall of Fame player (New York Yankees, New York Mets) and manager (Yankees, Mets and Houston Astros)
- John Carenza, professional soccer player with the St. Louis Stars and member of the 1972 U.S. Olympic Team.
- Kevin Coleman Jr., wide receiver for the Miami Dolphins
- John Collins Muhammad, Alderman of Ward 21 of St. Louis (2017–2023)
- Yuri Collins, basketball player for Ironi Ness Ziona of the Israeli Basketball Premier League
- Joe Garagiola, MLB player (St. Louis Cardinals, Pittsburgh Pirates, Chicago Cubs, New York Giants) and broadcaster
- Chase Hendricks, college football wide receiver for the California Golden Bears
- Jacob Hummel, Missouri state senator
- Jamal Roberts, college football running back for the Missouri Tigers
- Francis Slay, mayor of St. Louis 2001–2017

=== Faculty ===
- John Hamman, close-up magician
