= 2025 Gator Bowl (December) =

Postseason college football bowl game

2025 TaxSlayer Gator Bowl
- 81st Gator Bowl
Virginia Cavaliers	Missouri Tigers
(10–3)	(8–4)
ACC	SEC
13	7
Head coach: Tony Elliott	Head coach: Eliah Drinkwitz
AP / Coaches / CFP; 20 / 21 / 19	AP / Coaches / CFP; 25 / NR / NR
	1	2	3	4	Total
Virginia	0	3	10	0	13
Missouri	7	0	0	0	7
- Date: December 27, 2025
- Season: 2025
- Stadium: EverBank Stadium
- Location: Jacksonville, Florida
- MVP: Chandler Morris (QB, Virginia)
- Favorite: Missouri by 4
- Referee: Tuta Salaam (Big 12)
- Attendance: 31,802

United States TV coverage
- Network: ABC
- Announcers: Bob Wischusen (play-by-play), Louis Riddick (analyst), and Kris Budden (sideline) (ABC); JP Shadrick (play-by-play), Gino Torretta (analyst) and KC Jones (sideline) (Touchdown Radio)

The 2025 Gator Bowl was a college football bowl game played on December 27, 2025, at EverBank Stadium located in Jacksonville, Florida. The 81st annual Gator Bowl game began at approximately 7:30 p.m. EST and aired on ABC. The Gator Bowl was one of the 2025–26 bowl games concluding the 2025 FBS football season. The game was sponsored by financial technology company TaxSlayer and was officially known as the TaxSlayer Gator Bowl.

The game featured the Virginia Cavaliers from the Atlantic Coast Conference (ACC) and the Missouri Tigers from the Southeastern Conference (SEC). The Cavaliers defeated the Tigers by a score of 13–7.

== Teams ==
Consistent with conference tie-ins, the game featured Virginia from the Atlantic Coast Conference (ACC) and Missouri from the Southeastern Conference (SEC). This was the second meeting between the programs; Missouri won their only prior meeting, in 1973.

=== Virginia Cavaliers ===
The Cavaliers posted their most successful season to date under head coach Tony Elliott, having reached 10 wins in a season for only the second time in program history after 1989. Included in their 8–1 start to the season (their best since 1990) was a seven-game winning streak, their longest since 2007.

Virginia had their first appearances in an AP, Coaches, or College Football Playoff (CFP) top 25 poll since 2019, with their initial No. 14 ranking being their highest since the inception of the CFP in 2014.

=== Missouri Tigers ===
Missouri finished the regular season at 8–4. After opening the season with a non-conference slate, including a game against Kansas, Missouri built momentum early. The season opener was part of a six-game home stretch to start 2025, the longest home stand in program history.

Despite high hopes—buoyed by back-to-back 10+ win seasons prior—the Tigers hit turbulence in SEC play, finishing 4–4 in conference. On offense, Missouri averaged 32.2 points per game, while defensively they allowed just 19.4 points per game.

== Game summary ==
2025 TaxSlayer Gator Bowl

Quarter	1	2	3	4	Total
No. 19 Virginia	0	3	10	0	13
Missouri	7	0	0	0	7

at TIAA Bank Field • Jacksonville, Florida

- Date: Saturday, December 27, 2025
- Game time: 7:30 p.m. EST
- Game weather: Sunny • Temperature: 68 °F (20 °C) • Wind: 5 mph (8.0 km/h) west
- Game attendance: 31,802
- Referee: Tuta Salaam
- TV announcers (ABC): Bob Wischusen (play-by-play), Louis Riddick (analyst), and Kris Budden (sideline)
- Box score

=== Statistics ===
Statistics	UVA	MIZ
First downs	18	13
Plays–yards	79–308	55–260
Rushes–yards	41–110	32–159
Passing yards	198	101
Passing: comp–att–int	25–38–0	12–23–1
Time of possession	38:34	21:26

Team	Category	Player	Statistics
Virginia	Passing	Chandler Morris	25/38, 198 yards
Virginia	Rushing	Harrison Waylee	20 carries, 68 yards, TD
Virginia	Receiving	Eli Wood IV	4 catches, 71 yards
Missouri	Passing	Matt Zollers	12/22, 101 yards, INT
Missouri	Rushing	Ahmad Hardy	15 carries, 89 yards
Missouri	Receiving	Donovan Olugbode	5 catches, 49 yards
