= Beau Pribula =

American football player

No. 7 – Virginia Cavaliers
- Position: Quarterback
- Class: Redshirt Senior

Personal information
- Listed height: 6 ft 2 in (1.88 m)
- Listed weight: 215 lb (98 kg)

Career information
- High school: Central York (York, Pennsylvania)
- College: Penn State (2022–2024); Missouri (2025); Virginia (2026–present)
- Stats at ESPN

Beau Pribula is an American college football quarterback for the Virginia Cavaliers. He previously played for the Penn State Nittany Lions and Missouri Tigers.

== Early life ==
College recruiting
| Name | Hometown | School | Height | Weight | Commit date |
|---|---|---|---|---|---|
| Beau Pribula; QB | York, PA | Central York | 6 ft 2 in (1.88 m) | 215 lb (98 kg) | Aug 3, 2020 |
| Beau Pribula; QB | Recruit ratings: Scout: Rivals: 247Sports: ESPN: | | | | |
Overall recruit ranking: Rivals: Unranked 247Sports: 464 ESPN: Unranked
Note: In many cases, Scout, Rivals, 247Sports, On3, and ESPN may conflict in their listings of height and weight.; In these cases, the average was taken. ESPN grades are on a 100-point scale.; Sources: "2022 Team Ranking". Rivals.com.

Pribula is a four-star recruit as a transfer. Out of high school, Pribula was a four-star recruit by On3.com and ESPN, and was a three-star recruit by 247Sports and Rivals.com. He was a three-year captain in high school and led his team to 11–1, 10–1, and 9–2 records. Pribula committed to Penn State on August 3, 2020, over offers from Nebraska, Rutgers, and more.

== College career ==
=== Penn State ===
As a freshman in 2022, Pribula was redshirted. In the weeks leading up to the start of the 2023 season, controversy swirled around the Nittany Lions' starting quarterback position. Drew Allar, the 5-star quarterback in the same class as Pribula, was being weighed against the more agile passing threat in Pribula. In the end, Penn State coach James Franklin chose to start 5-star Allar, while having Pribula split as much time with Allar as would be possible. In 2023, he was the back-up to Drew Allar, and played in 11 games. Pribula got his first rushing touchdown against West Virginia on September 2, and his first passing touchdown against Delaware a week later. He was the leading rusher for Penn State against Rutgers with 71 yards on 8 carries and 1 touchdown, after Allar went down with an injury. In the Peach Bowl against Ole Miss, he had a 48-yard touchdown pass, on his only throwing attempt, in the 38–25 loss. He ended the season with 10 total touchdowns.

In 2024, Pribula played in 12 games. He started his 2024 season with a 19-yard touchdown pass to Tyler Warren in a 34–12 win against West Virginia. In Week 9, Allar went down with an injury against Wisconsin right before halftime. Down by a score, Pribula entered the game and led Penn State to a 28–13 comeback victory. He went 11/13, threw for 98 yards, and a touchdown. Due to Allar announcing he was not declaring for the NFL Draft and would be returning to Penn State for his final year, Pribula entered the transfer portal on December 15.

=== Missouri ===
On December 22, 2024, Pribula committed to the Missouri Tigers. Pribula was expected to compete with returning quarterback Sam Horn for the starting position at Missouri; both had been named team captains. In Week 1 against Central Arkansas, Pribula started the first half and Horn the second. Pribula was named the starter for the season. In Week 9 against Vanderbilt, Pribula suffered a dislocated ankle and was sidelined until Week 13 against Oklahoma.

Following the season, Pribula entered the transfer portal for a second time, and he did not compete in the Gator Bowl against Virginia.

=== Virginia ===
On January 12, 2026, Pribula committed to the Virginia Cavaliers for his redshirt senior season.

=== Statistics ===
| Season | Team | Games | | | Passing | | | | | | | | Rushing | | | |
| Season | Team | GP | GS | Record | Cmp | Att | Pct | Yds | Y/A | TD | Int | Rtg | Att | Yds | Avg | TD |
|---|---|---|---|---|---|---|---|---|---|---|---|---|---|---|---|---|
| 2022 | Penn State | Redshirt | | | | | | | | | | | | | | |
| 2023 | Penn State | 11 | 0 | — | 11 | 21 | 52.4 | 149 | 7.1 | 4 | 0 | 141.9 | 56 | 329 | 5.9 | 6 |
| 2024 | Penn State | 12 | 0 | — | 26 | 35 | 74.3 | 275 | 7.9 | 5 | 1 | 185.7 | 38 | 242 | 6.3 | 4 |
| 2025 | Missouri | 10 | 10 | 7–3 | 182 | 270 | 67.6 | 1,941 | 7.4 | 11 | 7 | 141.8 | 95 | 297 | 3.2 | 6 |
| 2026 | Virginia | 10 | 10 | 5–5 | 155 | 236 | 65.7 | 1,727 | 7.3 | 15 | 3 | 145.4 | 103 | 262 | 2.5 | 2 |
| Career | | 43 | 20 | 12–8 | 374 | 562 | 66.5 | 4,092 | 7.3 | 35 | 13 | 143.6 | 292 | 1,130 | 3.9 | 18 |

== Personal life ==
His older brother Cade played quarterback at Sacred Heart and the University of Delaware.
