= Jamal Roberts (American football) =

American football player (born 2004)

- Roberts in 2026

No. 20 – Missouri Tigers
- Position: Running back
- Class: Redshirt Junior

Personal information
- Born: October 26, 2004 (age 22)
- Listed height: 6 ft 0 in (1.83 m)
- Listed weight: 216 lb (98 kg)

Career information
- High school: St. Mary's (St. Louis, Missouri)
- College: Missouri (2023–present)
- Stats at ESPN

Jamal Roberts (born October 26, 2004) is an American college football running back for the Missouri Tigers.

== Early life ==
Roberts attended St. Mary's High School in St. Louis, Missouri. As a senior in 2022, he rushed for 1,899 yards with 28 touchdowns and was named the class 4 offensive player of the year. He committed to the University of Missouri to play college football.

== College career ==
Roberts played in two games his first year at Missouri in 2023, rushing one time for negative one yard, and redshirted. As a redshirt freshman in 2024, he appeared in 13 games and 53 carries for 216 yards with three touchdowns. Roberts spent 2025 as the backup to Ahmad Hardy, rushing 124 times for 753 yards with six touchdowns.

In the 2026 season, Roberts became the starting running back after Hardy was shot during the off-season. In Week 5, Roberts ran for 211 yards and 3 touchdowns in a 45-17 victory against No. 8 Florida. In the following game against Texas A&M, Roberts ran for 222 yards and two touchdowns in a 27-6 victory. With his performances against Florida and Texas A&M, he joined Derrick Henry and Leonard Fournette as the only SEC running backs with 200 rushing yards in consecutive games against FBS opponents in the past 20 seasons.
