= Kevin Coleman Jr. =

American football player (born 2003)

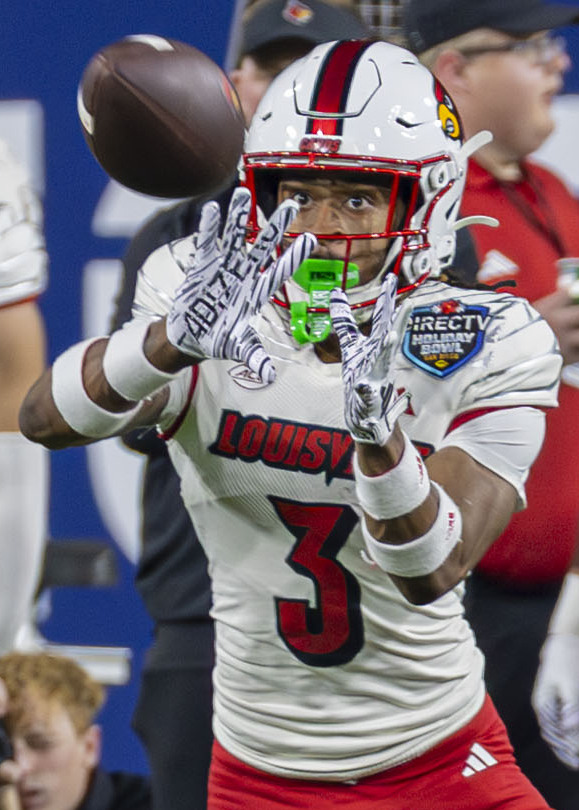
- Coleman Jr. in 2023

No. 21 – Miami Dolphins
- Position: Wide receiver
- Roster status: Active

Personal information
- Born: September 10, 2003 (age 23); St. Louis, Missouri, U.S.
- Listed height: 5 ft 10 in (1.78 m)
- Listed weight: 179 lb (81 kg)

Career information
- High school: St. Mary's (St. Louis)
- College: Jackson State (2022); Louisville (2023); Mississippi State (2024); Missouri (2025)
- NFL draft: 2026: 5th round, 177th overall pick

Career history
- Miami Dolphins (2026–present)

Awards and highlights
- SWAC Freshman of the Year (2022)

Career NFL statistics as of Week 9, 2026
- Receptions: 8
- Receiving yards: 82
- Receiving touchdowns: 2
- Stats at Pro Football Reference

Kevin Lamar Coleman Jr. (born September 10, 2003) is an American professional football wide receiver for the Miami Dolphins of the National Football League (NFL). He played college football for the Jackson State Tigers, the Louisville Cardinals, the Mississippi State Bulldogs, and the Missouri Tigers. Coleman was selected by the Dolphins in the fifth round of the 2026 NFL draft.

== Early life ==
Coleman grew up in St. Louis, Missouri and attended St. Mary's High School. As a senior he caught 37 passes for 985 yards and 17 touchdowns, rushed for 435 yards and six touchdowns on 37 carries, and gained 573 yards and scored six touchdowns on 21 kickoff and punt returns. Coleman was a consensus top-100 recruit and committed to play college football at FCS Jackson State over offers from major programs such as Oregon, Miami, and Florida State.

== College career ==
Coleman had 32 receptions for 475 yards and three touchdowns as a true freshman. Coleman was named the Southwestern Athletic Conference (SWAC) Freshman of the Year at the end of the regular season. He was the leading receiver in Jackson State's 41–34 loss in the 2022 Celebration Bowl, gaining 137 yards and one touchdown on seven receptions. Coleman entered the NCAA transfer portal a few days after the Celebration Bowl.

Coleman ultimately transferred to Louisville.

On January 1, 2024, Coleman announced that he would be entering the transfer portal for the second time. On January 4, 2024, he announced that he would be transferring to Mississippi State.

During the winter transfer period following the 2024 college football season, Coleman announced he would be transferring to Missouri for his final season of eligibility.

== Professional career ==
Pre-draft measurables
Height	Weight	Arm length	Hand span	Wingspan	40-yard dash	10-yard split	20-yard split	Vertical jump	Broad jump
5 ft 10 1/4 in (1.78 m)	179 lb (81 kg)	30 in (0.76 m)	9 1/2 in (0.24 m)	6 ft 2 in (1.88 m)	4.43 s	1.57 s	2.63 s	38.5 in (0.98 m)	10 ft 6 in (3.20 m)
All values from NFL Combine/Pro Day

Coleman was selected by the Miami Dolphins in the fifth round with the 177th overall pick in the 2026 NFL draft.
