= Ahmad Hardy =

American football player (born 2005)

No. 29 – Missouri Tigers
- Position: Running back
- Class: Junior

Personal information
- Born: December 19, 2005 (age 20); Brookhaven, Mississippi, U.S.
- Listed height: 5 ft 10 in (1.78 m)
- Listed weight: 210 lb (95 kg)

Career information
- High school: Lawrence County (Monticello, Mississippi)
- College: Louisiana–Monroe (2024); Missouri (2025–present)

Awards and highlights
- Consensus All-American (2025); SEC Newcomer of the Year (2025); Sun Belt Freshman of the Year (2024); First-team All-SEC (2025); First-team All-Sun Belt (2024)
- Stats at ESPN

Ahmad Hardy (born December 19, 2005) is an American college football running back for the Missouri Tigers. He previously played for the Louisiana–Monroe Warhawks.

== Early life and high school career ==
Hardy was born in Brookhaven, Mississippi and grew up in the small community of Oma, Mississippi. He attended Lawrence County High School in Monticello, Mississippi. As a senior, he rushed for 2,442 yards and 27 touchdowns, before committing to play college football at the University of Louisiana at Monroe.

== College career ==
=== Louisiana–Monroe ===
Hardy earned immediate playing time as a true freshman. In his collegiate debut against Jackson State, Hardy rushed for 103 yards and a touchdown in a 30–14 win. Against Troy, he rushed for 94 yards and the game's only touchdown, leading the Warhawks to a 13–9 victory. Against Southern Miss, he totaled 174 all-purpose yards, while rushing for two touchdowns in a 38–21 win. Hardy finished his freshman season rushing for 1,351 yards and 13 touchdowns, before announcing his intentions to enter the transfer portal. Hardy was named the Sun Belt Freshman of the Year and also received first-team all-conference honors at the end of the season.

=== Missouri ===
On December 18, 2024, Hardy announced that he would be transferring to the University of Missouri to play for the Missouri Tigers. On September 13, 2025, Hardy rushed for 250 yards on 22 carries and scored three touchdowns against the Louisiana Ragin' Cajuns. This total ranks as the seventh-highest single-game rushing performance in Missouri history and is tied for the 22nd-most rushing yards in a game by a Southeastern Conference player. On November 15, 2025, in Missouri's 49–27 victory over Mississippi State, Hardy rushed for 300 yards and 3 touchdowns on 25 carries, becoming only the second Missouri player to have 300 rushing yards in a game, the other being Devin West (319 yards on 33 carries) in 1998 against Kansas. Hardy's rushing total was also the third-highest in a game in SEC history, behind Darren McFadden of Arkansas in 2007 and Tre Mason of Auburn in 2013 (whose 304-yard performance was against Missouri). Hardy is the second Missouri player to rush for 250 or more yards in two separate games in a season, after West did this twice in 1998.

=== Statistics ===
College statistics
Season	Team	Games	Rushing				Receiving			
Season	Team	GP	Att	Yards	Avg	TD	Rec	Yards	Avg	TD
2024	Louisiana–Monroe	12	237	1,351	5.7	13	8	72	9.0	0
2025	Missouri	13	256	1,649	6.4	16	6	22	3.7	0
2026	Missouri	1	2	5	2.5	0	0	0	0.0	0
Career		26	495	3,005	6.1	29	14	94	6.7	0

== Personal life ==
Hardy is the son of Adrianne Broomfield. He grew up mostly with his mom raising four kids: three boys and one girl. He has a twin sister.

=== 2026 shooting ===
In May 2026, Hardy was shot in the leg at a concert in Laurel, Mississippi. Rashodrick Harris of Wayne County, Mississippi was charged May 25, 2026 with two counts of aggravated assault for shooting Hardy and another individual. Hardy underwent surgery and intends to return to football.
