= Daeden Hopkins =

American football player (born 2007)

No. 10 – Missouri Tigers
- Position: Defensive end
- Class: Sophomore

Personal information
- Born: March 31, 2007 (age 19)
- Listed height: 6 ft 6 in (1.98 m)
- Listed weight: 250 lb (113 kg)

Career information
- High school: Hermann (Hermann, Missouri)
- College: Missouri (2025–present)
- Stats at ESPN

Daeden Hopkins (born March 31, 2007) is an American college football defensive end for the Missouri Tigers.

== Early life ==
Hopkins attended Hermann High School in Hermann, Missouri, where he played defensive end and tight end. As a junior, he had 78 tackles and 16 sacks on defense and 968 receiving yards with 15 touchdowns on offense. He committed to the University of Missouri to play college football. People from the town sometimes call him The Wine Country Warhammer

== College career ==
Hopkins played in four games his first year at Missouri in 2025, recording seven tackles and 0.5 sacks. He entered his second season at Missouri in 2026 with more playing time, earning SEC co-defensive lineman of the week the second week of the season.
