= Connor Tollison =

American football player (born 2002)

No. 55 – Missouri Tigers
- Position: Center
- Class: Graduate student

Personal information
- Born: August 7, 2002 (age 24)
- Listed height: 6 ft 4 in (1.93 m)
- Listed weight: 285 lb (129 kg)

Career information
- High school: Jackson (Jackson, Missouri)
- College: Missouri (2021–2025)
- Stats at ESPN

Connor Tollison (born August 7, 2002) is an American college football center for the Missouri Tigers.

== Early life ==
Tollison attended Jackson High School in Jackson, Missouri, where he helped his team to a state championship, while also being a three-time all-state selection and the 2021 Carr Trophy winner. Coming out of high school, Tollison was rated as a three-star recruit and committed to play college football for the Missouri Tigers over offers from schools such as Alabama, Oklahoma, Tennessee, and Texas A&M.

== College career ==
As a freshman in 2021, Tollison appeared in just two games for Missouri. In 2022, he appeared in 13 games where he made 12 starts for Missouri at center. In 2023, he started all 13 games for the Tigers. In week 11 of the 2024 season, Tollison suffered a season-ending knee injury versus Oklahoma. He finished the 2024 season, starting nine games for Missouri. Instead of declaring for the 2025 NFL draft, Tollison decided to return to the Tigers for the 2025 season.
