= Donovan Olugbode =

American football player (born 2007)

No. 1 – Missouri Tigers
- Position: Wide receiver
- Class: Sophomore

Personal information
- Born: June 25, 2007 (age 19)
- Listed height: 6 ft 2 in (1.88 m)
- Listed weight: 210 lb (95 kg)

Career information
- High school: IMG Academy (Bradenton, Florida)
- College: Missouri (2025–present)
- Stats at ESPN

Donovan Olugbode (born June 25, 2007) is an American college football wide receiver for the Missouri Tigers.

== Early life ==
Olugbode attended Montini Catholic High School in Lombard, Illinois for his freshman year before transferring to IMG Academy in Bradenton, Florida for his sophomore to senior years. During his three years at IMG he had 63 receptions for 1,003 yards and nine touchdowns. A top 100 recruit in his class, Olugbode committed to the University of Missouri to play college football.

== College career ==
Olugbode competed for playing time his true freshman year at Missouri in 2025. In his first career game, he had four receptions for 37 yards.
