= Sam Horn (American football) =

American football and baseball player (born 2003)

Personal information
- Born: August 21, 2003 (age 23) Lawrenceville, Georgia, U.S.
- Height: 6 ft 4 in (193 cm)
- Weight: 222 lb (101 kg; 15 st 12 lb)
- Football career

No. 21 – Missouri Tigers
- Position: Quarterback
- Class: Redshirt Junior

Career information
- High school: Collins Hill (Suwanee, Georgia)
- College: Missouri (2022–2025)
- Stats at ESPN

Sport
- Baseball career

Los Angeles Dodgers
- Pitcher
- Bats: Right Throws: Right

Samuel Horn (born August 21, 2003) is an American professional baseball pitcher in the Los Angeles Dodgers organization and a former college football quarterback for the Missouri Tigers.

== Early life ==
Horn attended Collins Hill High School in Gwinnett County, Georgia. Coming out of high school, he was rated as a four-star recruit, where he committed to play college football and college baseball for the Missouri Tigers. Horn was also teammates with future NFL player, Travis Hunter.

== College football career ==
Horn took a redshirt in 2022. He saw limited playing time as the backup quarterback in 2023, completing three of his five passes for 54 yards and a touchdown and an interception, before missing the entirety of the 2024 season after undergoing Tommy John surgery. Heading into the 2025 season, he competed for the starting quarterback job with Penn State transfer Beau Pribula. After competing through the spring and summer, both Horn and Pribula played in the team's opener against Central Arkansas with no starter announced. While scheduled to start the second half, Horn took the field for one trick play during the first half for a 6 yard run and had his tibia broken by defensive back Dude Person. Horn subsequently underwent surgery and was declared out for the remainder of the season, with Pribula continuing the game and assuming the starting role. He withdrew from school to pursue his baseball career after the 2025 season.

== Baseball career ==
During his three year college career, Horn pitched in just 15 innings with five starts, after suffering through arm injuries, requiring Tommy John surgery. After his collegiate career he was selected in the 17th round with the 525th overall pick in the 2025 Major League Baseball draft by the Los Angeles Dodgers, where he signed with the organization for $497,500.

After missing the entire 2026 minor league season while rehabbing his college football injuries, Horn was assigned by the Dodgers to begin his professional career with the Glendale Desert Dogs of the Arizona Fall League.
