= 2024 Oklahoma Sooners football team =

American college football season

2024 Oklahoma Sooners football

Armed Forces Bowl, L 20–21 vs. Navy
- Conference: Southeastern Conference
- Record: 6–7 (2–6 SEC)
- Head coach: Brent Venables (3rd season)
- Offensive coordinator: Seth Littrell (1st season; first 7 games)
- Co-offensive coordinators: Joe Jon Finley (1st season); Kevin Johns (interim; after week 7)
- Offensive scheme: Spread
- Defensive coordinator: Zac Alley (1st season)
- Co-defensive coordinators: Todd Bates (3rd season); Jay Valai (3rd season)
- Base defense: Multiple 4–2–5
- Home stadium: Gaylord Family Oklahoma Memorial Stadium

Uniform

2024 Southeastern Conference football standings
	Conf.			Overall
Team	W		L	W		L
No. 4 Texas y^	7	–	1	13	–	3
No. 6 Georgia y$^	6	–	2	11	–	3
No. 9 Tennessee ^	6	–	2	10	–	3
No. 22 Missouri	5	–	3	10	–	3
No. 11 Ole Miss	5	–	3	10	–	3
No. 17 Alabama	5	–	3	9	–	4
No. 19 South Carolina	5	–	3	9	–	4
LSU	5	–	3	9	–	4
Texas A&M	5	–	3	8	–	5
Florida	4	–	4	8	–	5
Arkansas	3	–	5	7	–	6
Vanderbilt	3	–	5	7	–	6
Oklahoma	2	–	6	6	–	7
Auburn	2	–	6	5	–	7
Kentucky	1	–	7	4	–	8
Mississippi State	0	–	8	2	–	10
Championship: Georgia 22, Texas 19 ^{OT}
^ – College Football Playoff participant; $ – Conference champion; y – Championship game participant; Rankings from AP Poll

The 2024 Oklahoma Sooners football team represented the University of Oklahoma in the Southeastern Conference (SEC) during the 2024 NCAA Division I FBS football season, the 130th season for the Oklahoma Sooners. They were led by third year head coach Brent Venables and played their home games at Gaylord Family Oklahoma Memorial Stadium in Norman, Oklahoma. This was their first year as members of the SEC.

== Offseason ==
=== Departures ===
==== Outgoing transfers ====
Player	Position	Height	Weight	Year	New team
Marcus Hicks	OL	6'6	302	Redshirt junior	South Dakota State
D.J. Graham II	WR	6'0	203	Senior	Utah State
Jason Llewellyn	TE	6'5	255	Sophomore	Texas Tech
Tawee Walker	RB	5'9	216	Junior	Wisconsin
Dillon Gabriel	QB	5'11	204	Redshirt senior	Oregon
Nate Anderson	OL	6'4	309	Redshirt junior	SMU
Savion Byrd	OL	6'5	296	Redshirt sophomore	SMU
Reggie Grimes II	DL	6'4	278	Senior	Memphis
Key Lawrence	DB	6'1	206	Senior	Ole Miss
Marcus Major	RB	6'0	219	Redshirt senior	Minnesota
Daylan Smothers	RB	5'11	190	Freshman	NC State
Kelvin Gilliam Jr.	DL	6'3	295	Redshirt sophomore	Virginia Tech
Cayden Green	OL	6'5	316	Freshman	Missouri
Aaryn Parks	OL	6'4	301	Redshirt junior	South Carolina
Davis Beville	QB	6'6	226	Redshirt senior	South Carolina
LV Bunkley-Shelton	WR	5'11	197	Redshirt junior	Georgia Southern
Daeh McCullough	DB	6'1	181	Freshman	Louisville
Blake Smith	TE	6'4	256	Redshirt junior	Texas State
Gavin Marshall	K	6'1	183	Sophomore	Maryland
Konnor Near	LB	6'2	220	Redshirt senior	Ferris State
Shane Whitter	LB	6'1	222	Redshirt junior	North Texas
Hayden Bray	TE	6'4	267	Redshirt sophomore	Vanderbilt
Justin Harrington	CB	6'3	214	Senior	Washington
Jasiah Wagoner	CB	5'10	170	Freshmen	California
Gavin Freeman	WR	5'10	170	Junior	Oklahoma State
General Booty	QB	6'3	194	Redshirt sophomore	Louisiana-Monroe

Quarterback Dillon Gabriel transferred to Oregon after two seasons with the Sooners. Coming over from UCF, Gabriel ranked sixth among all FBS quarterbacks this season in passing yards with 3,660, while also ranking eighth in passing touchdowns with 30 and was tenth in completion percentage in his second season with the Sooners.

=== Additions ===
==== Incoming transfers ====
Player	Position	Height	Weight	Year	Former team
Spencer Brown	OL	6'6	315	Redshirt senior	Michigan State
Dezjhon Malone	CB	6'2	200	Junior	San Diego State
Deion Burks	WR	5'11	195	Redshirt sophomore	Purdue
Sam Franklin	RB	5'10	200	Redshirt sophomore	UT Martin
Bauer Sharp	TE	6'5	245	Redshirt sophomore	Southeastern Louisiana
Febechi Nwaiwu	OL	6'4	316	Sophomore	North Texas
Jocelyn Malaska	CB	6'1	178	Redshirt freshman	Utah
Tyler Keltner	K	5'11	188	Redshirt senior	Florida State
Caiden Woullard	DL	6'5	252	Junior	Miami (OH)
Michael Tarquin	OL	6'5	300	Redshirt senior	USC
Jake Roberts	TE	6'5	248	Junior	Baylor
Casey Thompson	QB	6'1	200	Graduate	Florida Atlantic
Geirean Hatchett	OL	6'4	303	Sophomore	Washington
Branson Hickman	IOL	6'2	285	Redshirt junior	SMU
Damonic Williams	DL	6'1	317	Junior	TCU

Purdue transfer Deion Burks committed to the Sooners after a breakout season, finishing with 629 receiving yards, 47 catches, and 7 touchdown catches and later being named second-team All-Big Ten honors. Casey Thompson committed to the Sooners from Florida Atlantic after previous stints with Nebraska and Texas. Thompson, the son of former Sooners quarterback Charles Thompson, returned to the state of Oklahoma, where he will play his seventh season. He joins Paul Moriarty and Brenen Thompson as the third player in modern history to start out at Texas and transferred to Oklahoma.

==== Recruiting ====
College recruiting
Name	Hometown	School	Height	Weight	Commit date
David Stone; DL	Del City, OK	IMG Academy	6 ft 4 in (1.93 m)	280 lb (130 kg)	Aug 26, 2023
David Stone; DL	Recruit ratings: Rivals: 247Sports: ESPN: (91)				
Taylor Tatum; RB	Longview, TX	Longview High School	5 ft 10 in (1.78 m)	200 lb (91 kg)	Jul 21, 2023
Taylor Tatum; RB	Recruit ratings: Rivals: 247Sports: ESPN: (86)				
Zion Kearney; WR	Missouri City, TX	Hightower High School	6 ft 2 in (1.88 m)	195 lb (88 kg)	Apr 27, 2023
Zion Kearney; WR	Recruit ratings: Rivals: 247Sports: ESPN: (84)				
Davon Mitchell; TE	Los Alamitos, CA	Los Alamitos High School	6 ft 3 in (1.91 m)	250 lb (110 kg)	Jul 8, 2023
Davon Mitchell; TE	Recruit ratings: Rivals: 247Sports: ESPN: (86)				
Nigel Smith II; DL	Melissa, TX	Melissa High School	6 ft 4 in (1.93 m)	264 lb (120 kg)	Sep 8, 2023
Nigel Smith II; DL	Recruit ratings: Rivals: 247Sports: ESPN: (84)				
Danny Okoye; DE	Tulsa, OK	NOAH Homeschool	6 ft 4 in (1.93 m)	240 lb (110 kg)	Sep 20, 2023
Danny Okoye; DE	Recruit ratings: Rivals: 247Sports: ESPN: (82)				
Reggie Powers; S	Dayton, OH	Centerville High School	6 ft 0 in (1.83 m)	200 lb (91 kg)	Oct 28, 2023
Reggie Powers; S	Recruit ratings: Rivals: 247Sports: ESPN: (79)				
Ivan Carreon; WR	Odessa, TX	Odessa High School	6 ft 6 in (1.98 m)	195 lb (88 kg)	Jun 30, 2023
Ivan Carreon; WR	Recruit ratings: Rivals: 247Sports: ESPN: (81)				
Jaydan Hardy; S	Lewisville, TX	Lewisville High School	6 ft 0 in (1.83 m)	170 lb (77 kg)	Apr 22, 2023
Jaydan Hardy; S	Recruit ratings: Rivals: 247Sports: ESPN: (83)				
Zion Ragins; WR	Gray, GA	Jones County High School	5 ft 7 in (1.70 m)	150 lb (68 kg)	Jul 18, 2023
Zion Ragins; WR	Recruit ratings: Rivals: 247Sports: ESPN: (82)				
Eugene Brooks; OL	Chatsworth, CA	Sierra Canyon School	6 ft 4 in (1.93 m)	325 lb (147 kg)	Jul 25, 2023
Eugene Brooks; OL	Recruit ratings: Rivals: 247Sports: ESPN: (80)				
Eddy Pierre-Louis; OL	Tampa, FL	Tampa Catholic High School	6 ft 3 in (1.91 m)	335 lb (152 kg)	Dec 15, 2023
Eddy Pierre-Louis; OL	Recruit ratings: Rivals: 247Sports: ESPN: (80)				
Jayden Jackson; DL	Bradenton, FL	IMG Academy	6 ft 1 in (1.85 m)	295 lb (134 kg)	Jul 13, 2023
Jayden Jackson; DL	Recruit ratings: Rivals: 247Sports: ESPN: (78)				
Jeremiah Newcombe; CB	Queen Creek, AZ	Casteel High School	5 ft 11 in (1.80 m)	175 lb (79 kg)	Jul 13, 2023
Jeremiah Newcombe; CB	Recruit ratings: Rivals: 247Sports: ESPN: (79)				
Michael Hawkins Jr. QB	McKinney, TX	Emerson High School	6 ft 1 in (1.85 m)	185 lb (84 kg)	Apr 8, 2023
Michael Hawkins Jr. QB	Recruit ratings: Rivals: 247Sports: ESPN: (81)				
James Nesta; DE	Cornelius, NC	William A. Hough High School	6 ft 5 in (1.96 m)	205 lb (93 kg)	Jun 20, 2023
James Nesta; DE	Recruit ratings: Rivals: 247Sports: ESPN: (78)				
Wyatt Gilmore; DE	Rogers, MN	Rogers High School	6 ft 4 in (1.93 m)	245 lb (111 kg)	Jun 28, 2023
Wyatt Gilmore; DE	Recruit ratings: Rivals: 247Sports: ESPN: (79)				
Michael Boganowski; LB	Junction City, KS	Junction City High School	6 ft 2 in (1.88 m)	195 lb (88 kg)	Oct 19, 2023
Michael Boganowski; LB	Recruit ratings: Rivals: 247Sports: ESPN: (79)				
Devon Jordan; CB	Tulsa, OK	Union High School	5 ft 10 in (1.78 m)	170 lb (77 kg)	Oct 20, 2023
Devon Jordan; CB	Recruit ratings: Rivals: 247Sports: ESPN: (79)				
Eli Bowen; CB	Denton, TX	John H. Guyer High School	5 ft 8 in (1.73 m)	170 lb (77 kg)	Aug 24, 2023
Eli Bowen; CB	Recruit ratings: Rivals: 247Sports: ESPN: (80)				
Isaiah Autry; OT	Fulton, MS	Itawamba Agricultural High School	6 ft 7 in (2.01 m)	290 lb (130 kg)	Apr 21, 2023
Isaiah Autry; OT	Recruit ratings: Rivals: 247Sports: ESPN: (78)				
KJ Daniels; WR	Franklinton, LA	Bowling Green School	5 ft 10 in (1.78 m)	153 lb (69 kg)	Apr 17, 2023
KJ Daniels; WR	Recruit ratings: Rivals: 247Sports: ESPN: (80)				
Xavier Robinson; RB	Midwest City, OK	Carl Albert High School	6 ft 2 in (1.88 m)	221 lb (100 kg)	Jun 27, 2023
Xavier Robinson; RB	Recruit ratings: Rivals: 247Sports: ESPN: (79)				
Daniel Akinkunmi; OT	London, England	NFL Academy	6 ft 5 in (1.96 m)	320 lb (150 kg)	Oct 12, 2023
Daniel Akinkunmi; OT	Recruit ratings: Rivals: 247Sports: ESPN: (79)				
Mykel Patterson-McDonald; S	Moore, OK	Westmoore High School	5 ft 9 in (1.75 m)	175 lb (79 kg)	Jul 31, 2023
Mykel Patterson-McDonald; S	Recruit ratings: Rivals: 247Sports: ESPN: (77)				
Brendan Zurbrugg; QB	Alliance, OH	Alliance High School	6 ft 2 in (1.88 m)	185 lb (84 kg)	Aug 1, 2023
Brendan Zurbrugg; QB	Recruit ratings: Rivals: 247Sports: ESPN: (78)				
Josh Aisosa; OL	Edmond, OK	Edmond Santa Fe High School	6 ft 3 in (1.91 m)	305 lb (138 kg)	Aug 5, 2023
Josh Aisosa; OL	Recruit ratings: Rivals: 247Sports: ESPN: (77)				
Overall recruit ranking: Rivals: #6 247Sports: #8 ESPN: #7
Note: In many cases, Scout, Rivals, 247Sports, On3, and ESPN may conflict in their listings of height and weight.; In these cases, the average was taken. ESPN grades are on a 100-point scale.; Sources: "Rivals commits". Rivals.; "ESPN commits". ESPN.; "2024 Team Ranking". Rivals.com.; "247Sports commits". 247Sports.

== Preseason ==
=== Award watch lists ===
Award	Player	Position	Year
Lott Trophy	Danny Stutsman	LB	Sr.
Maxwell Award	Jackson Arnold	QB	So.
Patrick Mannelly Award	Ben Anderson	LS	So.
Outland Trophy	Branson Hickman	OL	(redshirt) Sr.
Bronko Nagurski Trophy	Billy Bowman	DB	Jr.
Bronko Nagurski Trophy	Danny Stutsman	LB	Sr.
Jim Thorpe Award	Billy Bowman	DB	Jr.
Wuerffel Trophy	Gavin Sawchuk	RB	(redshirt) So.
Ray Guy Award	Luke Elizinga	P	Jr.
Walter Camp Award	Danny Stutsman	LB	Sr.
Doak Walker Award	Gavin Sawchuk	RB	(redshirt) So.
Biletnikoff Award	Nic Anderson	WR	(redshirt) So.
Rimington Trophy	Branson Hickman	OL	(redshirt) Sr.
Bednarik Award	Billy Bowman	DB	Jr.
Bednarik Award	Danny Stutsman	LB	Sr.
Butkus Award	Danny Stutsman	LB	Sr.
Rotary Lombardi Award	Danny Stutsman	LB	Sr.

=== Preseason SEC awards ===
2024 Preseason All-SEC teams

Media First Team

Position	Player	Class
Defense
LB	Danny Stutsman	Senior
DB	Billy Bowman	Senior

Media Third Team

Position	Player	Class
Offense
WR	Deion Burks	RS Junior

Coaches First Team

Position	Player	Class
Defense
LB	Danny Stutsman	Senior
DB	Billy Bowman	Senior

=== SEC media poll ===
The 2024 SEC Media days were held on July 15–18, 2024 at Omni Hotel Dallas in downtown Dallas, Texas. The preseason polls was released on July 19, 2024. Each team had their head coaches available to talk to the media at the event. OU representatives were available on July 16, 2024. Head coach Brent Venables along with Jackson Arnold, Danny Stutsman and Billy Bowman Jr represented the Sooners. Coverage of the event was televised on SEC Network and ESPN. Oklahoma was predicted to finish 8th in the preseason poll.

== Schedule ==
Oklahoma and the SEC announced the 2024 conference schedule on December 13, 2023. The 2024 schedule consists of 7 home games, 4 away games and 1 neutral-site game in the regular season. The Sooners will host all 4 non-conference games against Temple, Houston, Tulane, and Maine.

The Sooners hosted three SEC conference opponents against Tennessee, South Carolina, and Alabama and traveled to four SEC conference opponents against Auburn, Ole Miss, Missouri, and LSU. The Sooners faced Texas in Dallas, Texas at the Cotton Bowl in the Red River Rivalry. The Sooners had their bye weeks in week 6 (October 5) and week 12 (November 16).

Date	Time	Opponent	Rank	Site	TV	Result	Attendance
August 30	6:00 p.m.	Temple*	No. 16	Gaylord Family Oklahoma Memorial Stadium; Norman, OK	ESPN	W 51–3	83,329
September 7	6:45 p.m.	Houston*	No. 15	Gaylord Family Oklahoma Memorial Stadium; Norman, OK	SECN	W 16–12	83,653
September 14	2:30 p.m.	Tulane*	No. 15	Gaylord Family Oklahoma Memorial Stadium; Norman, OK	ESPN	W 34–19	83,325
September 21	6:30 p.m.	No. 6 Tennessee	No. 15	Gaylord Family Oklahoma Memorial Stadium; Norman, OK (College GameDay)	ABC	L 15–25	84,701
September 28	2:30 p.m.	at Auburn	No. 21	Jordan-Hare Stadium; Auburn, AL (SEC Nation)	ABC	W 27–21	88,044
October 12	2:30 p.m.	vs. No. 1 Texas	No. 18	Cotton Bowl; Dallas, TX (Red River Rivalry, SEC Nation)	ABC	L 3–34	92,100
October 19	11:45 a.m.	South Carolina^{†}		Gaylord Family Oklahoma Memorial Stadium; Norman, OK	SECN	L 9–35	83,331
October 26	11:00 a.m.	at No. 18 Ole Miss		Vaught–Hemingway Stadium; Oxford, MS	ESPN	L 14–26	67,926
November 2	11:00 a.m.	Maine*		Gaylord Family Oklahoma Memorial Stadium; Norman, OK	SECN+/ESPN+	W 59–14	82,831
November 9	6:45 p.m.	at No. 24 Missouri		Faurot Field; Columbia, MO (Tiger-Sooner Peace Pipe)	SECN	L 23–30	62,621
November 23	6:30 p.m.	No. 7 Alabama		Gaylord Family Oklahoma Memorial Stadium; Norman, OK	ABC	W 24–3	84,053
November 30	6:00 p.m.	at LSU		Tiger Stadium; Baton Rouge, LA	ESPN	L 17–37	99,364
December 27	11:00 a.m.	vs. Navy*		Amon G. Carter Stadium; Fort Worth, TX (Armed Forces Bowl)	ESPN	L 20–21	50,754
*Non-conference game; ^{†}Homecoming; Rankings from AP Poll (and CFP Rankings after November 1) - Released prior to game; All times are in Central time

== Personnel ==
=== Coaching staff ===
Offensive coordinator Jeff Lebby was named the next head coach at Mississippi State after two years with the Sooners. With Lebby, the Sooners scored 65+ points three times with a 43.2 points scoring average. Defensive coordinator and linebackers coach Ted Roof mutually agreed to part ways after two years with the Sooners. Head coach Brent Venables offered Roof an opportunity to remain on the staff in a different role, however Roof declined. With Roof, the Sooners improved from 98th in scoring defense and 121st in total defense in 2022 to being ranked 46th and 78th respectively in 2023. Following these departures Venables promoted offensive analyst Seth Littrell to the vacant offensive coordinator/Quarterbacks coaching position. Tight ends coach Joe Jon Finley was promoted to Co-Offensive Coordinator. Jacksonville State defensive coordinator Zac Alley was hired as Co-Defensive coordinator, with Todd Bates and Jay Valai being promoted to Co-Defensive coordinators as well. On October 20 following seven games and lack luster offensive play, Littrell was dismissed, Finley assumed play calling duties and offensive analyst Kevin Johns was promoted to interim Co-offensive coordinator and quarterbacks coach.

Name	Position	Consecutive years
Brent Venables	Head coach	3rd
Joe Jon Finley	Offensive coordinator/Tight ends	1st
Zac Alley	Co-defensive coordinator/Linebackers	1st
Todd Bates	Associate head coach/Co-defensive coordinator/Run defense/Defensive tackles	3rd
Bill Bedenbaugh	Offensive line	12th
Miguel Chavis	Defensive ends	3rd
Brandon Hall	Safeties	3rd
Emmett Jones	Passing game coordinator/Wide receivers	2nd
DeMarco Murray	Running backs	5th
Jay Valai	Co-defensive coordinator/Pass defense/Cornerbacks & nickelbacks	3rd
Kevin Johns	Co-offensive coordinator/Quarterbacks	1st
Jerry Schmidt	Director of sports enhancement & strength and conditioning	3rd
Source: 2024 Oklahoma Sooners Roster

=== Roster ===
2024 Oklahoma Sooners Football
Quarterback: 9 Michael Hawkins Jr. – freshman (6'1, 204); 11 Jackson Arnold – sophomore (6'1, 211); 12 Brendan Zurbrugg – freshman (6'2, 202); 14 Steele Wasel - (redshirt) freshman (6'3, 219); 16 Casey Thompson – (redshirt) graduate (6'0, 197); Running back: 0 Kalib Hicks – (redshirt) freshman (5'11, 213); 2 Jovantae Barnes – junior (6'0, 207); 8 Taylor Tatum – freshman (5'10, 205); 20 Sam Franklin – (redshirt) junior (5'10, 198); 21 Xavier Robinson – freshman (6'0, 222); 22 Chapman McKown – (redshirt) freshman (5'5, 174); 23 Emeka Megwa – (redshirt) junior (6'0, 211); 25 Andy Bass – freshman (5'11, 208); 27 Gavin Sawchuk – (redshirt) sophomore (5'11, 200); 29 Gabę Sawchuck – freshman (5'10, 185); Wide receiver: 1 Jayden Gibson – junior (6'5, 197); 3 Jalil Farooq – senior (6'1, 207); 4 Nic Anderson – (redshirt) sophomore (6'4, 219); 5 Andrel Anthony – senior (6'1, 183); 6 Deion Burks – (redshirt) junior (5'9, 190); 7 Zion Kearney – freshman (6'1, 200); 13 J.J. Hester – (redshirt) senior (6'4, 202)'; 15 Brenen Thompson – junior (5'9, 165); 17 Jaquaize Pettaway – sophomore (5'10, 189); 26 Zion Ragins – freshman (5'8, 145); 28 KJ Daniels – freshman (5'9, 152); 82 Ivan Carreon – freshman (6'6, 223); 83 Major Melson – (redshirt) senior (5'10, 187); 85 Trey Brown – (redshirt) freshman (5'9, 181); 88 Jacob Jordan – freshman (5'9, 182); 89 Eli Merck – (redshirt) freshman (6'0, 208); Tight end: 10 Bauer Sharp – (redshirt) junior (6'4, 247); 18 Kaden Helms – (redshirt) sophomore (6'5, 239); 19 Kade McIntyre – (redshirt) freshman (6'3, 221); 45 Hampton Fay – (redshirt) junior (6'5, 245); 80 Josh Fanuiel – (redshirt) junior (6'3, 250); 84 Davon Mitchell – freshman (6'3, 250); 87 Jake Roberts – graduate (6'4, 252); Long snapper: 50 Ben Anderson – (redshirt) sophomore (6'5, 240); 58 Ethan Lane – (redshirt) senior (5'11, 230)	Offensive line: 51 Branson Hickman – – (redshirt) senior (6'2, 301); 52 Troy Everett – – (redshirt) junior (6'3, 308); 54 Febechi Nwaiwu – – (redshirt) junior (6'4, 339); 55 Eddy Pierre–Louis – – freshman (6'3, 305); 56 Eugene Brooks – – freshman (6'3, 336); 57 Gunnar Allen – – (redshirt) sophomore (6'0, 297); 58 Spencer Brown – – (redshirt) senior (6'6, 321); 61 Kenneth Wermy – – (redshirt) freshman (6'5, 305); 64 Joshua Bates – – (redshirt) freshman (6'3, 309); 65 Ty Kubicek – – (redshirt) freshman (6'2, 294); 66 Geiern Hatchett – – (redshirt) senior (6'5, 312); 70 Michael Tarquin – – (redshirt) senior (6'6, 317); 71 Logan Howland – – (redshirt) freshman (6'6, 317); 72 Josh Aisosa – – freshman (6'3, 323); 73 Isiah Autry-Dent – – freshman (6'6, 310); 74 Evan McClure – – freshman (6'4, 275); 75 Daniel Akikunmi – – freshman (6'6, 321); 76 Jacob Sexton – – junior (6'6, 322); 77 Heath Ozaeta – – (redshirt) freshman (6'5, 318); 79 Jake Taylor – – (redshirt) sophomore (6'6, 309); Defensive line: 0 David Stone – DT – freshman (6'3, 294); 6 Nigel Smith II – DE – freshman (6'4, 267); 16 Danny Okoye – DE – freshman (6'3, 253); 30 Trace Ford – DE – (redshirt) graduate (6'2, 246); 32 R Mason Thomas – DE – junior (6'2, 240); 34 Adepoju Adebawore – DE – sophomore (6'4, 251); 40 Ethan Downs – DE – senior (6'4, 265); 42 Wyatt Gilmore – DE – freshman (6'4, 245); 44 Taylor Wein – DE – (redshirt) freshman (6'4, 257); 52 Damonic Williams – DT – junior (6'1, 319); 54 Bergin Kyser – DE– freshman (6'3, 245); 55 Ashton Sanders – DT – (redshirt) freshman (6'1, 295); 56 Gracen Halton – DT – junior (6'2, 291); 65 Jayden Jackson – DT – freshmen (6'2, 300); 90 Caiden Woulland – DL – senior (6'4, 259); 91 Drew Heinig – DT – (redshirt) freshmen (6'5, 288); 93 Ace Hodges – DT – freshmen (6'1, 284); 94 Mari Atchison – DE – freshmen (6'2, 268); 95 Da'Jon Terry – DT – (redshirt) graduate (6'3, 323); 96 Davon Sears – DT – (redshirt) graduate (6'2, 295); 99 Markus Strong – – (redshirt) freshmen (6'3, 290)	Linebacker: 1 Dasan McCullough – junior (6'5, 223); 7 Jaren Kanak – junior (6'2, 223); 10 Kip Lewis – (redshirt) sophomore (6'1, 221); 11 Kobie McKinzie – (redshirt) sophomore (6'2, 242); 17 Taylor Heim – (redshirt) freshmen (6'6, 216); 20 Lewis Carter – sophomore (6'0, 227); 24 Samuel Omosigho – sophomore (6'2, 236); 28 Danny Stutsman – senior (6'4, 241); 33 Phil Picciotti – (redshirt) freshman (6'3, 239); 38 Owen Heinecke – (redshirt) sophomore (6'2, 227); 47 James Nesta – freshmen (6'3, 216); 97 Kyle Carlson – (redshirt) freshmen (6'3, 190); Defensive back: 2 Billy Bowman Jr. – CB – senior (5'10, 200); 3 Robert Spears-Jennings – S – junior (6'1, 219); 4 Dez Malone – – senior (6'0, 204); 5 Woodi Washington – CB – (redshirt) graduate (5'11, 195); 6 Makari Vickers – – sophomore (6'1, 192); 9 Gentry Williams – – junior (6'0, 187); 12 Devon Jordan – – freshmen (5'11, 179); 13 Reggie Powers III – – freshmen (5'11, 208); 14 Jaydan Hardy – – freshmen (5'10, 174); 15 Kendal Dolby – DB – senior (5'11, 185); 18 Erik McCarty – DB – (redshirt) freshmen (6'1, 185); 19 Jacobe Johnson – DB – sophomore (6'2, 200); 21 Jeremiah Newcombe – DB – freshmen (5'9, 182); 22 Peyton Bowen – DB – sophomore (6'0, 200); 23 Eli Bowen – DB – freshmen (5'9, 186); 25 Michael Boganowski – DB – freshmen (6'2, 211); 26 Kani Walker – CB – (redshirt) junior (6'2, 205); 27 Jayden Rowe – DB – (redshirt) sophomore (6'2, 223); 29 Casen Calmus – DB – (redshirt) freshmen (5'10, 196); 31 Cale Fugate – DB – (redshirt) freshmen (5'10, 190); 35 Jakeb Snyder – DB – (redshirt) freshmen (5'8, 180); 39 Peter Schuh – DB – (redshirt) sophomore (5'8, 184); 41 Emmett Jones III – DB – (redshirt) freshmen (6'0, 182); 45 Mikel Patterson – McDonald – DB – freshmen (5'10, 172); 46 Dax Noles – DB – freshmen (6'0, 192); 48 Jocelyn Malaska – DB – (redshirt) sophomore (6'1, 186); Placekicker: 34 Zach Schmit – (redshirt) senior (5'10, 194); 35 Liam Evans – freshmen (5'7, 1801; 36 Josh Plaster – (redshirt) graduate (6'0, 187); 98 Tyler Keltner – (redshirt) graduate (5'11, 181); Punter: 31 Ashton Logan – (redshirt) sophomore (6'2, 217); 48 Luke Elziga – (redshirt) graduate (6'4, 229)

=== Spring game ===
2024 Oklahoma Spring Game

Quarter	1	2	3	4	Total
White	8	26	14	10	58
Red	28	14	11	12	65

at Gaylord Family Oklahoma Memorial Stadium • Norman, OK

- Date: Saturday, April 20, 2024
- Game time: 2:30 p.m. CDT
- Game attendance: 45,861

== Game summaries ==
=== vs. Temple ===
Game One – Temple Owls (0-0) at No. 16 Oklahoma Sooners (0-0)

Quarter	1	2	3	4	Total
Owls	0	0	3	0	3
No. 16 Sooners	17	17	3	14	51

at Gaylord Family Oklahoma Memorial Stadium • Norman, OK

- Date: Friday, August 30, 2024
- Game time: 6:00 p.m.
- Game weather: • Cloudy Temperature: 84
- Game attendance: 83,329
- Referee: Jeff Heaser
- TV announcers (ESPN): Anish Shroff (play-by-play), Andre Ware (analyst), and Paul Carcaterra (sideline)

Game information

First quarter

- (11:17) OKLA – Bauer Sharp 14 yard pass from Jackson Arnold, Tyler Keltner kick (Drive: 7 plays, 76 yards, 2:47; OKLA 7–0)
- (8:07) OKLA – Deion Burks 14 yard pass from Jackson Arnold, Tyler Keltner kick (Drive: 5 yards, 43 yards, 1:43; OKLA 14–0)
- (0:43) OKLA – Tyler Kelnter 50 yard field goal (Drive: 4 plays 1 yard, 1:22; OKLA 17–0)

Second quarter

- (8:05) OKLA – Tyler Keltner 42 yard field goal (Drive: 12 plays, 34 yards, 4:51; OKLA 20-0)
- (5:28) OKLA – Deion Burks 8 yard pass from Jackson Arnold, Tyler Keltner kick (Drive: 5 plays, 44 yards, 1:22; OKLA 27–0)
- (0:36) OKLA – Deion Burks 5 yard pass from Jackson Arnold, Tyler Keltner kick (Drive: 2 plays, 6 yards, 0:38; OKLA 34–0)

Third quarter

- (7:53) OKLA – Tyler Kelnter 24 yard field goal (Drive: 8 plays, 52 yards, 2:26; OKLA 37–0)
- (3:07) TEM – Maddux Trujillo 49 yard field goal (Drive: 10 plays, 44 yards, 4:46; OKLA 37–3)

Fourth quarter

- (11:44) OKLA – Jaren Knak 21 yard fumble return, Tyler Keltner kick (Drive: 3 plays, 4 yards, 2:02; OKLA 44–3)
- (3:11) OKLA – Taylor Tatum 8 yard rush, Tyler Keltner kick (Drive: 9 plays, 85 yards, 4:23; OKLA 51–3)

Statistics	TEM	OU
First downs	13	18
Total yards	197	378
Rushing yards	69	217
Passing yards	128	161
Passing: Comp–Att–Int	12–25–2	20–30
Time of possession	31:31	28:29

Team	Category	Player	Statistics
Temple	Passing	Brock Forrest	12/25, 128 yards, 2 INT
Temple	Rushing	EJ Wilson Jr.	6 carries, 31 yards
Temple	Receiving	Danta Wright	3 receptions, 36 yards
Oklahoma	Passing	Jackson Arnold	17/25, 141 yards, 4 TD's
Oklahoma	Rushing	Taylor Tatum	4 carries, 66 yards, 1 TD
Oklahoma	Receiving	Deion Burks	6 receptions, 36 yards, 3 TD's

=== Houston ===
Game Two – Houston Cougars (0–1) vs. No. 15 Oklahoma Sooners (1–0)

Quarter	1	2	3	4	Total
Cougars	3	3	6	0	12
No. 15 Sooners	7	7	0	2	16

at Gaylord Family Oklahoma Memorial Stadium • Norman, OK

- Date: Saturday, September 7, 2023
- Game time: 6:45 p.m. CDT
- Game weather: • Sunny Temperature: 78
- Game attendance: 83,653
- Referee: Stephen Baron
- TV announcers (SEC Network): Tom Hart (play-by-play), Jordan Rodgers (analyst), and Cole Cubelic (sideline)

Game information

First quarter

- (12:59) OKLA – Brenen Thompson 10 yard pass from Jackson Arnold, Tyler Keltner kick (Drive: 1 play, 10 yards, 0:06; OKLA 7–0)
- (4:29) HOU – Joseph Kim 43 yard field goal (Drive: 12 plays, 63 yards, 8:25; OKLA 7–3)

Second quarter

- (12:28) OKLA – Jake Roberts 11 yard pass from Jackson Arnold, Tyler Keltner kick (Drive: 8 plays, 81 yards, 3:11; OKLA 14–3)
- (0:00) HOU – Joseph Kim 44 yard field goal (Drive: 6 plays, 55 yards, 1:17; OKLA 14–6)

Third quarter

- (13:15) HOU – Joseph Manjack IV 44 yard pass from Donovan Smith, two-point conversion failed (Drive: 4 plays, 75 yards, 1:45; OKLA 14–12)

Fourth quarter

- (1:42) OKLA – Gracen Halton Safety (Drive: 1 play -5 yards, 0:04; OKLA 16–12)

Statistics	HOU	OU
First downs	18	15
Total yards	318	249
Rushes/yards	35/58	29/75
Passing yards	260	174
Passing: Comp–Att–Int	24–28–1	19–32–1
Time of possession	35:03	24:57

Team	Category	Player	Statistics
Houston	Passing	Donovan Smith	24/28, 260 yards, 1 TD, 1 INT
Houston	Rushing	Stacy Sneed	11 carries, 33 yards
Houston	Receiving	Joseph Manjack IV	3 receptions, 72 yards, 1 TD
Oklahoma	Passing	Jackson Arnold	19/32, 174 yards, 2 TD's, 1 INT
Oklahoma	Rushing	Jovantae Barnes	12 carries, 40 yards
Oklahoma	Receiving	Deion Burks	9 receptions, 53 yards

=== Tulane ===
Tulane Green Wave (1–1) vs. No. 15 Oklahoma Sooners (2–0)

Quarter	1	2	3	4	Total
Green Wave	0	6	7	6	19
No. 15 Sooners	7	14	3	10	34

at Gaylord Family Oklahoma Memorial Stadium • Norman, OK

- Date: Saturday, September 14, 2024
- Game time: 2:30 p.m. CDT
- Game weather: Sunny Temperature: 91
- Game attendance: 83,325
- Referee: Chris Lamertina
- TV announcers (ESPN): Dave Pasch (play-by-play), Dusty Dvoracek (analyst), and Taylor McGregor (sideline)

Game information

First quarter

- (7:36) OKLA – Jackson Arnold 1 yard rush, Tyler Keltner kick (Drive: 14 plays, 69 yards, 5:46; OKLA 7–0)

Second quarter

- (10:02) OKLA – Taylor Tatum 9 yard pass from Jackson Arnold, Tyler Kelnter kick (Drive: 7 plays, 60 yards, 1:58; OKLA 14–0)
- (3:39) OKLA – Taylor Tatum 1 yard rush, Tyler Keltner kick (Drive: 6 plays, 67 yards, 1:36; OKLA 21–0)
- (0:19) TLN – Reggie Brown 7 yard pass from Ty Thompson (Drive: 11 plays, 75 yards, 3:20; OKLA 21–6)

Third quarter

- (9:20) OKLA – Tyler Keltner 29 yard field goal (Drive: 13 plays, 64 yards, 5:40; OKLA 24–6)
- (4:45) TLN – Makhi Hughes 8 yard pass from Darian Mensah, Ethan Head kick (Drive: 9 plays, 75 yards, 4:35; OKLA 24–13)

Fourth quarter

- (14:20) TLN – Tyler Grubbs 22 yard interception (Drive: 1 play, -5 yards, 0:25; OKLA 24–19)
- (6:05) OKLA – Jackson Arnold 24 yard rush, Tyler Keltner kick (Drive: 4 plays, 43 yards, 2:13; OKLA 31–19)
- (2:55) OKLA – Tyler Keltner 39 yard field goal (Drive: 4 plays, 5 yards, 1:39; OKLA 34–19)

Statistics	TULN	OU
First downs	16	23
Total yards	279	349
Rushes/yards	34/106	45/182
Passing yards	173	167
Passing: Comp–Att–Int	15–33–1	19–30–1
Time of possession	28:18	31:42

Team	Category	Player	Statistics
Tulane	Passing	Darian Mensah	14/32, 166 yards ,1 TD, 1 INT
Tulane	Rushing	Makhi Hughes	19 carries, 71 yards
Tulane	Receiving	Dontae Fleming	4 receptions, 59 yards
Oklahoma	Passing	Jackson Arnold	18/29, 169 yards, 1 TD, 1 INT
Oklahoma	Rushing	Jackson Arnold	14 carries, 97 yards, 2 TD
Oklahoma	Receiving	Deion Burks	7 receptions, 80 yards

=== No. 6 Tennessee ===
No 6. Tennessee Volunteers (3–0) vs. No. 15 Oklahoma Sooners (3–0)

Quarter	1	2	3	4	Total
No. 6 Volunteers	10	9	3	3	25
No. 15 Sooners	3	0	0	12	15

at Gaylord Family Oklahoma Memorial Stadium • Norman, OK

- Date: Saturday, September 21, 2024
- Game time: 6:30 p.m. CDT
- Game weather: Sunny Temperature: 92
- Game attendance: 84,701
- Referee: Matt Loeffler
- TV announcers (ABC): Chris Fowler (play-by-play), Kirk Herbstreit (analyst), and Holly Rowe (sideline)

Game information

First quarter

- (3:45) TEN – Max Gilbert 27 yard field goal (Drive: 6 plays, 42 yards, 2:36; TEN 3–0)
- (0:42) OKLA – Tyler Keltner 37 yard field goal (Drive: 10 plays, 55 yards, 3:12; Tied 3–3)
- (0:03) TEN – Dont'e Thornton 66 yard pass from Nico Iamaleava, Max Gilbert kick (Drive: 2 plays, 75 yards, 0:39; TEN 10–3)

Second quarter

- (9:12) TEN – Jayson Jenkins Safety (Drive: 1 play - 4 yards, 0:05; TEN 12–3)
- (1:40) TEN – Dylan Sampson 1 yard rush, Max Gilbert kick (Drive: 8 plays, 46 yards, 3:47; TEN 19–3)

Third quarter

- (6:03) TEN – Max Gilbert 41 yard field goal (Drive: 6 plays, 53 yards, 2:49; TEN 22–3)

Fourth quarter

- (8:25) OKLA – Jovantae Barnes 2 yards pass from Michael Hawkins Jr. (Drive: 10 plays, 68 yards, 3:30; TEN 22–9)
- (3:35) TEN – Max Gilbert 32 yard field goal (Drive: 4 plays, 9 yards, 1:40; TEN 25–9)
- (1:14) OKLA – Jovantae Barnes 1 yard rush (Dive: 9 plays, 76 yards, 2:34; TEN 25–10)

Statistics	TENN	OU
First downs	14	16
Total yards	345	222
Rushes/yards	52/151	34/36
Passing yards	194	186
Passing: Comp–Att–Int	13–21	18–34–1
Time of possession	35:41	24:28

Team	Category	Player	Statistics
Tennessee	Passing	Nico Iamaleava	13/21, 194 yards, 1 TD
Tennessee	Rushing	Dylan Sampson	24 carries, 92 yards, 1 TD
Tennessee	Receiving	Bru McCoy	4 receptions, 92 yards
Oklahoma	Passing	Michael Hawkins Jr.	11/18, 132 yards, 1 TD
Oklahoma	Rushing	Michael Hawkins Jr.	12 carries, 22 yards
Oklahoma	Receiving	Bauer Sharp	4 receptions, 36 yards

=== At Auburn ===
No. 21 Oklahoma Sooners (3–1) vs. Auburn Tigers (2–2)

Quarter	1	2	3	4	Total
No. 21 Sooners	7	0	3	17	27
Tigers	0	14	0	7	21

at Jordan-Hare Stadium •Auburn, AL

- Date: Saturday, September 28, 2024
- Game time: 2:30 p.m. CDT
- Game weather: Cloudy Temperature: 79 °F (26 °C) • Wind: SW 10 miles per hour (16 km/h)
- Game attendance: 88,043
- Referee: Jason Autrey
- TV announcers (ABC): Joe Tessitore (play-by-play), Jordan Rodgers (analyst), and Katie George (sideline)

Game information

First quarter

- (12:30) OKLA – Michael Hawkins Jr. 48 yard rush, Zach Schmit kick (Drive: 4 plays, 68 yards, 1:20; OKLA 7–0)

Second quarter

- (12:52) AUB – KeAndre Lambert-Smith 31 yard pass from Payton Thorne, Towns McGough kick (Drive: 4 plays, 72 yards, 2:02; Tied 7–7)
- (5:41) AUB – Malcolm Simmons 48 yard pass from Payton Thorne, Towns McGough kick (Drive: 7 plays, 81 yards, 3:58; AUB 14–7)

Third quarter

- (2:26) OKLA – Zach Schmit 24 yard field goal (Drive: 11 plays, 51 yards, 6:34; AUB 14–10)

Fourth quarter

- (14:12) AUB – Luke Deal 1 yard pass from Payton Thorne, Towns McGough kick (Drive: 7 plays, 58 yards, 3:14; AUB 21–10)
- (8:32) OKLA – Jovantae Barnes 2 yard rush (Drive: 4 plays, 67 yards, 1:40; AUB 21–16)
- (4:01) OKLA – Kip Lewis 63 yard interception return, Michael Hawkins Jr. rush (Drive: 7 plays, 32 yards, 4:31; OKLA 24–21)
- (0:54) OKLA – Zach Schmit 39 yard field goal (Drive: 4 plays, 3 yards, 1:00; OKLA 27–21)

Statistics	OU	AUB
First downs	11	26
Total yards	291	482
Rushes/yards	32/130	43/144
Passing yards	161	338
Passing: Comp–Att–Int	10–15	21–32–1
Time of possession	24:34	35:26

Team	Category	Player	Statistics
Oklahoma	Passing	Michael Hawkins Jr.	10/15, 161 yards
Oklahoma	Rushing	Michael Hawkins Jr.	14 carries, 69 yards, 1 TD
Oklahoma	Receiving	J.J. Hester	3 receptions, 86 yards
Auburn	Passing	Payton Thorne	21/32, 338 yards, 3 TD's 1 INT
Auburn	Rushing	Jarquez Hunter	17 carries, 97 yards
Auburn	Receiving	Cam Coleman	3 receptions, 82 yards

=== No.1 Texas (Red River Rivalry) ===
No. 1 Texas Longhorns (5–0) vs. No. 18т Oklahoma Sooners (4–1)

Quarter	1	2	3	4	Total
No.1 Longhorns	0	21	3	10	34
No. 18т Sooners	3	0	0	0	3

at Cotton Bowl •Dallas, TX

- Date: Saturday, October 12, 2024
- Game time: 2:30 p.m. CDT
- Game weather: • Sunny Temperature: 92
- Game attendance: 92,100
- Referee: Steve Marlowe
- TV announcers (ABC): Chris Fowler (play-by-play), Kirk Herbstreit (analyst), and Holly Rowe (sideline)

Game information

First quarter

- (00:10) OKLA – Tyler Keltner 42 yard field goal (Drive: 11 plays, 38 yards, 4:42; OKLA 3–0)

Second quarter

- (11:20) TEX – Gunnar Helm 7 yard pass from Quinn Ewers, Bert Auburn kick (Drive: 10 plays, 75 yards, 3:50; TEX 7–3)
- (2:21) TEX – Quintrevion Wisner 35 yard rush fumbled recovered by Silas Bolden, Bert Auburn kick (Drive: 4 plays, 84 yards, 1:58; TEX 14–3)
- (1:40) TEX – Quintrevion Wisner 43 yard rush, Bert Auburn kick (Drive: 1 play, 43 yards, 0:11; TEX 21–3)

Third quarter

- (1:01) TEX – Bert Auburn 41 yard field goal (Drive: 11 plays, 45 yards, 5:35; TEX 24–3)

Fourth quarter

- (7:44) TEX – Bert Auburn 29 yard field goal (Drive: 7 plays, 13 yards, 3:36; TEX 27–3)
- (5:21) TEX – Quinn Ewers 1 yard rush, Bert Auburn kick (Drive: 3 plays, 32 yards, 1:06; TEX 34–3)

Statistics	TEX	OU
First downs	17	18
Total yards	406	237
Rushes/yards	30/177	39/89
Passing yards	229	147
Passing: Comp–Att–Int	21–31–1	19–30
Time of possession	27:53	32:07

Team	Category	Player	Statistics
Texas	Passing	Quinn Ewers	20/29, 199 yards, 1 TD, 1 INT
Texas	Rushing	Quintrevion Wisner	13 carries, 118 yards, 1 TD
Texas	Receiving	Gunnar Helm	5 receptions, 91 yards, 1 TD
Oklahoma	Passing	Michael Hawkins Jr.	19/30, 148 yards
Oklahoma	Rushing	Jovantae Barnes	14 carries, 38 yards
Oklahoma	Receiving	Zion Kearney	4 receptions, 45 yards

=== South Carolina ===
South Carolina Gamecocks (3–3) vs. Oklahoma Sooners (4–2)

Quarter	1	2	3	4	Total
Gamecocks	21	11	0	3	35
Sooners	0	3	6	0	9

at Gaylord Family Oklahoma Memorial Stadium • Norman, OK

- Date: Saturday, October 19, 2024
- Game time: 11:45 a.m. CDT
- Game weather: Sunny • Temperature: 68
- Game attendance: 83,331
- Referee: Wayne Winkler
- TV announcers (SEC Network): Tom Hart (play-by-play), Cole Cubelic (analyst), and Alyssa Lang (sideline)

Game information

First quarter

- (12:33) USC – Raheim Sanders 3 yard rush, Alex Herrera kick (Drive: 5 plays, 41 yards, 2:13; USC 7–0)
- (11:21) USC – Tonka Hemingway 36 yard fumble return, Alex Herrera kick (Drive: 3 plays, 1 yards, 1:12; USC 14–0)
- (9:40) USC – Nick Emmanori 65 yard interception return, Alex Herrera kick (Drive: USC 21–0)

Second quarter

- (12:08) USC – Alex Herrera 39 yard field goal (Drive: 4 plays, 4 yards, 1:49; USC 24–0)
- (5:17) OKLA – Zach Schmit 44 yard field goal (Drive: 11 plays, 53 yards, 4:01; USC 24–3)
- (1:54) USC – Joshua Simon 33 yard pass from LaNorris Sellers, Maurice Brown rush (Drive: 8 plays, 75 yards, 3:23; USC 32–3)

Third quarter

- (7:33) OKLA – Brenen Thompson 54 yard pass from Jackson Arnold (Drive: 8 plays, 90 yards, 3:31; USC 32–9)

Fourth quarter

- (7:48) USC – Alex Herrera 33 yard field goal (Drive: 4 pays, 6 yards, 1:37; USC 35–9)

Statistics	SCAR	OU
First downs	15	19
Total yards	254	291
Rushes/yards	41/74	41/53
Passing yards	180	238
Passing: Comp–Att–Int	17–27	22–42–2
Time of possession	31:47	28:13

Team	Category	Player	Statistics
South Carolina	Passing	LaNorris Sellers	16/24, 175 yards, 1 TD
South Carolina	Rushing	Raheim Sanders	15 carries, 33 yards, 1 TD
South Carolina	Receiving	Joshua Simon	4 receptions, 43 yards, 1 TD
Oklahoma	Passing	Jackson Arnold	18/36, 225 yards, 1 TD
Oklahoma	Rushing	Jovantae Barnes	17 carries, 70 yards
Oklahoma	Receiving	Jacob Jordan	6 receptions, 86 yards

=== At No. 18 Ole Miss ===
Oklahoma Sooners (4–3) vs. No. 18 Ole Miss Rebels (5–2)

Quarter	1	2	3	4	Total
Sooners	7	7	0	0	14
No. 18 Rebels	7	3	13	3	26

at Vaught–Hemingway Stadium •Oxford, MS

- Date: Saturday, October 26, 2024
- Game time: 11:00 a.m. CDT
- Game weather: Sunny, 75 °F (24 °C)
- Game attendance: 67,926
- Referee: David Smith
- TV announcers (ESPN): Bob Wischusen (play-by-play), Louis Riddick (analyst), and Kris Budden (sideline)

Game information

First quarter

- (12:36) MISS – Henry Parrish Jr. 9 yard rush, Caden Davis kick (Drive: 6 plays, 75 yards, 2:24; MISS 7–0)
- (2:18) OKLA – Bauer Sharp 11 yard pass from Jackson Arnold, Zach Schmit kick (Drive: 8 plays, 60 yards, 3:43; Tied 7–7)

Second quarter

- (7:29) MISS – Caden Davis 35 yard field goal (Drive: 10 plays, 68 yards, 4:25; MISS 10–7)
- (0:06) OKLA – Jacob Jordan 9 yard pass from Jackson Arnold, Zach Schmit kick (Drive: 13 plays, 92 yards, 2:34; OKLA 14–10)

Third quarter

- (9:34) MISS – Caden Prieskorn 24 yard pass from Jaxson Dart (Drive: 8 plays, 65 yards, 3:32; MISS 16–14)
- (5:20) MISS – JJ Pegues 1 yard rush, Caden Davis kick (Drive: 7 plays, 83 yards, 2:50; MISS 23–14)

Fourth quarter

- (14:51) MISS – Caden Davis 42 yard field goal (Drive: 6 plays, 43 yards, 2:02; MISS 26–14)

Statistics	OU	MISS
First downs	24	18
Total yards	329	380
Rushes/yards	50/147	31/69
Passing yards	182	311
Passing: Comp–Att–Int	22–31	22–30
Time of possession	33:45	26:15

Team	Category	Player	Statistics
Oklahoma	Passing	Jackson Arnold	22/31, 182 yards, 2 TD
Oklahoma	Rushing	Jovantae Barnes	16 carries, 67 yards
Oklahoma	Receiving	Jovantae Barnes	5 receptions, 57 yards
Ole Miss	Passing	Jaxson Dart	22/30, 311 yards, 1 TD
Ole Miss	Rushing	Henry Parrish Jr.	15 carries, 44 yards, 1 TD
Ole Miss	Receiving	Caden Prieskorn	5 receptions, 71 yards, 1 TD

=== Maine (FCS) ===
Maine Black Bears (FCS) (4–4) vs. Oklahoma Sooners (4–4)

Quarter	1	2	3	4	Total
Black Bears (FCS)	7	0	0	7	14
Sooners	7	28	14	10	59

at Gaylord Family Oklahoma Memorial Stadium •Norman, OK

- Date: Saturday, November 2, 2024
- Game time: 11:00 a.m. CDT
- Game weather: • Cloudy Temperature: 66
- Game attendance: 82,831
- Referee: Matt Roeffler
- TV announcers (SECN+/ESPN+): Brian Custer (play-by-play), Rod Gilmore (analyst), Lauren Sisler (sideline)

Game information

First quarter

- (7:59) MNE – Carter Peevy 3 yard pass to Cooper Heisey, Joey Bryson kick (Drive: 9 plays, 68 yards, 4:43; MNE 7–0)
- (7:07) OKLA – Jovantae Barnes 2 yard rush, Zach Schmit kick (Drive: 3 plays, 75 yards, 0:52; Tied 7–7)

Second quarter

- (13:44) OKLA – Taylor Tatum 1 yard rush, Zach Schmit kick (Drive: 15 plays, 85 yards, 5:14; OKLA 14–7)
- (6:46) OKLA – Jackson Arnold 1 yard rush, Zach Schmit kick (Drive: 3 plays, 37 yards, 0:49; OKLA 21–7)
- (3:16) OKLA – Jackson Arnold 90 yard pass to J.J. Hester, Zach Schmit kick (Drive: 2 plays, 90 yards, 0:23; OKLA 28–7)
- (0:34) OKLA – Jovantae Barnes 8 yard rush, Zach Schmit kick (Drive: 7 plays, 50 yards, 1:17; OKLA 35–7)

Third quarter

- (12:40) OKLA – Jovantae Barnes 19 yard rush, Zach Schmit kick (Drive: 4 plays, 38 yards, 1:36; OKLA 42–7)
- (6:20) OKLA – Jackson Arnold 9 yard pass to Kaden Helmes, Zach Schmit kick (Drive: 12 plays, 67 yards, 5:16; OKLA 49–7)

Fourth quarter

- (12:37) OKLA – Zach Schmit 24 yard field goal (Drive: 13 plays, 58 yards, 6:19; OKLA 52–7)
- (9:38) MNE – Nick Laughlin 5 yard rush, Joey Bryson kick (Drive: 6 plays, 75 yards, 2:59; OKLA 52–14)
- (6:17) OKLA – Xavier Robinson 4 yard rush, Liam Evans Kick (Drive: 8 plays, 75 yard, 3:21; OKLA 59–14)

Statistics	MNE	OU
First downs	14	26
Total yards	251	665
Rushes/yards	107	381
Passing yards	144	284
Passing: Comp–Att–Int	17–33	18–26
Time of possession	30:16	29:44

Team	Category	Player	Statistics
Maine	Passing	Carter Peevy	13/24, 123 yards, 1 TD
Maine	Rushing	Carter Peevy	6 carries, 30 yards
Maine	Receiving	Joe Gillette	3 receptions, 64 yards
Oklahoma	Passing	Jackson Arnold	15/21, 224 yards, 2 TD
Oklahoma	Rushing	Jovantae Barnes	18 carries, 203 yards, 3 TD
Oklahoma	Receiving	J.J. Hester	4 receptions, 112 yards, 1 TD

=== At No. 24 Missouri (rivalry) ===
Oklahoma Sooners (5–4) vs. No. 24 Missouri Tigers (6–2)

Quarter	1	2	3	4	Total
Sooners	0	9	0	14	23
No. 24 Tigers	0	3	7	20	30

at Faurot Field •Columbia, MO

- Date: Saturday, November 9, 2024
- Game time: 6:45 p.m. CST
- Game weather: • Sunny Temperature: 55
- Game attendance: 62,621
- Referee: Daniel Gautreaux
- TV announcers (SEC Network): Tom Hart (play-by-play), Jordan Rodgers (analyst), and Cole Cubelic (sideline)

Game information

First quarter

- No Score

Second quarter

- (14:56) OKLA – Zach Schmit 40 yard field goal (Drive: 13 plays, 58 yards, 5:53; OKLA 3–0)
- (7:58) OKLA – Zach Schmit 35 yard field goal (Drive: 6 plays, 27 yards, 2:49; OKLA 6–0)
- (3:26) MIZZ – Blake Craig 25 yard field goal (Drive: 5 plays, 20 yards, 2:22; OKLA 6–3)
- (0:00) OKLA – Zach Schmit 56 yard field goal (Drive: 3 plays, 13 yards, 0:10: OKLA 9–3)

Third quarter

- (5:43) MIZZ – Drew Pyne 13 yard pass to Theo Wease Jr., Blake Craig kick (Drive: 12 plays, 59 yards, 6:34; MIZZ 10–9)

Fourth quarter

- (8:47) MIZZ – Drew Pyne 5 yard pass to Brett Norflett (Drive: 9 plays, 30 yard, 4:56; MIZZ 16–9)
- (3:18) OKLA – Jackson Arnold 18 yard pass to Taylor Tatum, Zach Schmit kick (Drive: 12 plays, 75 yards, 5:29; Tied 16–16)
- (2:00) OKLA – Billy Bowman 43 yard fumble return, Zach Schmit kick (Drive: 3 plays, 18 yards, 1:18; OKLA 23-16)
- (1:03) MIZZ – Drew Pyne 10 yard pass to Theo Wease Jr., Blake Craig kick (Drive: 8 plays, 75 yard, 0:57; Tied 23–23)
- (0:22) MIZZ – Zion Young 17 year fumble return, Blake Craig kick (Drive: 2 plays, -8 yards, 0:41; MIZZ 30–23)

Statistics	OU	MIZZ
First downs	15	19
Total yards	257	278
Rushes/yards	122	135
Passing yards	135	143
Passing: Comp–Att–Int	17–26	14–27
Time of possession	25:34	34:26

Team	Category	Player	Statistics
Oklahoma	Passing	Jackson Arnold	15/24, 74 yards
Oklahoma	Rushing	Xavier Robinson	9 carries, 56 yards
Oklahoma	Receiving	Deion Burks	5 receptions, 44 yards
Missouri	Passing	Drew Pyne	14/27, 143 yards, 3 TD
Missouri	Rushing	Jamal Roberts	13 carries, 54 yards
Missouri	Receiving	Theo Wease Jr.	4 receptions, 70 yards, 2 TD

=== No. 7 Alabama ===
No. 7 Alabama Crimson Tide (8–2) vs. Oklahoma Sooners (5–5)

Quarter	1	2	3	4	Total
No. 7 Crimson Tide	3	0	0	0	3
Sooners	0	10	14	0	24

at Gaylord Family Oklahoma Memorial Stadium • Norman, OK

- Date: Saturday, November 23, 2024
- Game time: 6:30 p.m. CST
- Game weather: • Sunny Temperature: 62
- Game attendance: 84,053
- Referee: Wayne Winkler
- TV announcers (ABC): Chris Fowler (play-by-play), Kirk Herbstreit (analyst), and Holly Rowe (sideline)

Game information

First quarter

- (3:23) ALA – Graham Nicholson 22 yard field goal (Drive: 12 plays, 75 yards, 6:18; ALA 3–0)

Second quarter

- (8:14) OKLA – Zach Schmit 29 yard field goal (Drive: 11 plays, 51 yards, 5:58; Tied 3–3)
- (0:37) OKLA – Xavier Robinson 18 yard rush, Zach Schmit kick (Drive: 12 plays, 67 yards, 5:14; OKLA 10–3)

Third quarter

- (11:37) OKLA – Xavier Robinson 1 yard rush, Zach Schmit kick (Drive: 5 plays, 14 yards, 2:32; OKLA 17–3)
- (8:05) OKLA – Kip Lewis 49 yard interception return (Drive: 8 plays, 20 yards, 3:32; OKLA 24–3)

Fourth quarter

- No Score

Statistics	ALA	OU
First downs	13	18
Total yards	234	325
Rushes/yards	30/70	50/257
Passing yards	164	68
Passing: Comp–Att–Int	11–27–3	9–12
Time of possession	25:49	34:11

Team	Category	Player	Statistics
Alabama	Passing	Jalen Milroe	11/26, 164 yards, 3 INT
Alabama	Rushing	Jam Miller	12 carries, 45 yards
Alabama	Receiving	Germie Bernard	4 receptions, 60 yards
Oklahoma	Passing	Jackson Arnold	9/11, 68 yards
Oklahoma	Rushing	Jackson Arnold	25 carries, 131 yards
Oklahoma	Receiving	Bauer Sharp	2 receptions, 21 yards

=== At LSU ===
Oklahoma Sooners (6–5) vs. LSU Tigers (7–4)

Quarter	1	2	3	4	Total
Sooners	7	10	0	0	17
Tigers	7	17	7	6	37

at Tiger Stadium • Baton Rouge, LA

- Date: Saturday, November 30, 2024
- Game time: 6:00 p.m. CST
- Game weather: Clear • Temperature:52
- Game attendance: 99,364
- Referee: Matt Loeffler
- TV announcers (ESPN): Tom Hart (play-by-play), Jordan Rodgers (analyst), and Cole Cubelic (sideline)

Game information

First quarter

- (7:09) LSU – Garrett Nussmeier 18 yard pass to Kyren Lacy, Damian Ramos kick (Drive: 7 plays, 53 yards, 4:06; LSU 7–0)
- (3:26) OKLA – R Mason Thomas 0 yard fumble return, Zach Schmit kick (Drive: 5 plays, 0 yards, 1:27; Tied 7–7)

Second quarter

- (8:39) LSU – Damian Ramos 34 yard field goal (Drive: 5 plays, 44 yards, 1:45; LSU 10–7)
- (7:22) OKLA – Xavier Robinson 2 yard rush, Zach Schmit kick (Drive: 3 plays, 75 yards, 1:17; OU 14–10)
- (7:08) LSU – Aaron Anderson 100 yard kickoff return, Damian Ramos kick (Drive: 3 plays, 75 yards, 1:17; LSU 17–14)
- (2:13) OKLA – Zach Schmit 44 yard field goal (Drive: 11 plays, 49 yards, 4:55; Tied 17–17)
- (0:45) LSU – Garrett Nussmeier 40 yard pass to Chris Hilton Jr., Damian Ramos kick (Drive: 6 plays, 66 yards, 1:17; LSU 24–17)

Third quarter

- (6:48) LSU – Garrett Nussmeier 45 yard pass to Chris Hilton Jr., Damian Ramos kick (Drive: 9 plays, 88 yards, 4:51; LSU 31–17)

Fourth quarter

- (14:47) LSU – Damian Ramos 22 yard field goal (Drive: 9 plays, 54 yards, 2:35; LSU 34–17)
- (3:19) LSU – Damian Ramos 32 yard field goal (Drive: 6 plays, 13 yards, 3:10; LSU 37–17)

Statistics	OU	LSU
First downs	17	18
Total yards	227	395
Rushes/yards	37/167	29/110
Passing yards	110	285
Passing: Comp–Att–Int	14–22–1	23–34
Time of possession	29:13	30:47

Team	Category	Player	Statistics
Oklahoma	Passing	Jackson Arnold	14/21, 110 yards
Oklahoma	Rushing	Jackson Arnold	17 carries, 75 yards
Oklahoma	Receiving	J.J. Hester	1 receptions, 50 yards
LSU	Passing	Garrett Nussmeier	22/31, 277 yards, 3 TD
LSU	Rushing	Caden Durham	11 carries, 80 yards
LSU	Receiving	Chris Hilton Jr.	2 receptions, 85 yards, 2 TD

=== Navy (2024 Armed Forces Bowl) ===
2024 Armed Forces Bowl
Oklahoma Sooners (6-6) vs. Navy Midshipmen (9–3)

Quarter	1	2	3	4	Total
Sooners	14	0	0	6	20
Midshipmen	0	7	7	7	21

at Amon G. Carter Stadium • Fort Worth, Texas

- Date: Friday, December 27, 2024
- Game time: 11:00 a.m. CST
- Game weather: Sunny • Temperature: 58
- Game attendance: 50,754
- Referee: Mike McCabe
- TV announcers (ESPN): Courtney Lyle (play-by-play), Rene Ingoglia (analyst) & Morgan Uber (sideline)

Game information

First quarter

- (11:33) OKLA – Gavin Sawchuck 21 yard rush, Zach Schmit kick (Drive: 9 plays, 65 yards, 3:27; OKLA 7–0)
- (5:56) OKLA – Michael Hawkins Jr. 56 yard pass to Zion Kearney, Zach Schmit kick (Drive: 6 plays, 85 yards, 1:43; OKLA 14–0)

Second quarter

- (3:40) NAVY – Alex Tecza 11 yard rush, Nathan Kirkwood kick (Drive: 6 plays, 45 yards, 3:36; OKLA 14–7)

Third quarter

- (3:49) NAVY – Blake Horvath 95 yard rush, Nathan Kirkwood kick (Drive: 2 plays, 96 yards, 1:12; Tied 14–14)

Fourth quarter

- (4:34) NAVY – Blake Horvath 6 yard rush, Nathan Kirkwood kick (Drive: 12 plays, 66 yards, 7:32; NAVY 21–14)
- (0:06) OKLA – Michael Hawkins Jr. 10 yard pass to Jake Roberts (Drive: 13 plays, 65 yards, 1:41; NAVY 21–20)

Statistics	OU	NAVY
First downs	27	11
Total yards	433	318
Rushes/yards	40/158	40/226
Passing yards	275	92
Passing: Comp–Att–Int	29–44	7–13
Time of possession	29:50	30:10

Team	Category	Player	Statistics
Oklahoma	Passing	Michael Hawkins Jr.	28/43, 247 yards, 2 TD
Oklahoma	Rushing	Gavin Sawchuk	13 carries, 67 yards, 1 TD
Oklahoma	Receiving	Ivan Carreon	7 receptions, 72 yards
Navy	Passing	Blake Horvath	7/12, 92 yards,
Navy	Rushing	Blake Horvath	18 carries, 2 TD
Navy	Receiving	Nathan Kent	1 receptions, 32 yards

== Rankings ==
Ranking movements Legend: ██ Increase in ranking ██ Decrease in ranking — = Not ranked RV = Received votes т = Tied with team above or below
	Week																
Poll	Pre	1	2	3	4	5	6	7	8	9	10	11	12	13	14	15	Final
AP	16	15	15	15	21	19	18т	RV	—	—	—	—	—	—	—	—	—
Coaches	16	13	13	13	18	17	16	RV	—	—	—	—	—	—	—	—	—
CFP	Not released										—	—	—	—	—	—	Not released

== After the season ==
=== NFL draft ===
The following Sooners were selected in the 2025 NFL draft.

Player	Position	Height	Weight	Year
Danny Stutsman	LB	6'3	236	Senior
Billy Bowman Jr.	S	5'10	196	Senior
