= Okoye =

Nigerian given name

- Pronunciation: OH-KOH-YAY

Origin
- Language: Igbo
- Origin: Anambra
- Region of origin: Eastern Nigeria

Other names
- Variant form: Okorie

Okoye audio is a family name (surname) originating in Nigeria. It is an Anambra dialect derived from the central Igbo name Okorie (meaning someone born on orie market day, or Oye market day as known in Anambra State).

== Notable people with the name "Okoye" include ==
- Amobi Okoye, Nigerian-American National Football League defensive tackle for the Chicago Bears
- Christian Okoye, Nigerian-American former National Football League running back for the Kansas City Chiefs
- C. J. Okoye (born 2001), Nigerian-American football player
- Danny Okoye (born 2004), American football player
- Ebele Okoye, Nigerian painter
- Godfrey Okoye, Nigerian Catholic bishop
- Kelechi Okoye, Nigerian professional football player
- Lawrence Okoye, British record holder in men's discus and National Football League defensive end for the Miami Dolphins
- Louis Okoye, Japanese-Nigerian baseball player
- Maduka Okoye, Nigerian football player
- Monica Okoye, Japanese-Nigerian basketball player
- Nkeiru Okoye (born 1972), African American composer
- Nwamaka Okoye, Nigerian interior architect, writer and social entrepreneur
- Oge Okoye, Nigerian actress
- Pericoma Okoye, Nigerian singer and traditionist
- Sam Okoye, Nigerian former professional football player
- Samuel Okoye, Nigerian astrophysicist
- Stan Okoye, Nigerian-American basketball player
- Ugo Okoye, Nigerian former professional football player
