= Okori =

- Gender: Male
- Language: Ijaw

Origin
- Origin: Nigeria
- Meaning: to reside in favour
- Region of origin: Niger Delta

Okori audio is a surname of Ijaw origin and can be traced to multiple ethnolinguistic areas found across West, Central, and East Africa, as well as in parts of Oceania. It appears among several cultural groups, particularly in Nigeria and Uganda, where the highest populations bearing the name are found.

The name also occurs in countries such as Equatorial Guinea, Chad, Gabon, Kenya, and Papua New Guinea. Its presence across these regions reflects historical patterns of migration, inter-ethnic contact, cultural exchange and sociopolitical developments such as the transatlantic slave trade.

== Etymology and regional variations ==
=== Ijaw usage ===
In the Ijaw languages of the Niger Delta, Okori means to reside with favour. It is used as both a given name. The name is also found in place names, such as Okori-ama, a compound in the town of Ammassoma, Bayelsa State. The suffix -ama denotes a settlement or village in Ijaw dialects.

=== Eleme (Ogoni-Alesa) usage ===
In Rivers State, Nigeria, the town of Okori is located within the Eleme Local Government Area and is part of the Ogoni/Alesa cultural region. It is governed under a traditional institution headed by the Egbere Emere Okori I, the paramount ruler of the Okori community within the Eleme Kingdom. The name in this context functions both as a geographic identifier and a cultural title.

=== Central, east African, and Oceanic usage ===
Beyond Nigeria, the surname Okori is also recorded in Uganda, Equatorial Guinea, Chad, Gabon, and Kenya. In Uganda and Nigeria, the surname has the highest concentration. In Central African countries such as Chad and Gabon, the name is used within local naming systems and may carry distinct meanings. In Kenya, it appears among certain communities, potentially introduced through historical migration or cross-cultural ties. The name is also found in Papua New Guinea, likely reflecting diasporic spread or independent local usage.

=== Variants ===
Okorie is a name found among the Igbo people of southeastern Nigeria. Though sometimes considered a variant of Okori in phonetic terms, it has a separate origin and meaning. Okorie traditionally refers to a child born on the Orie market day in the Igbo calendar and is distinct from Okori in usage and cultural context.

== Notable individuals ==
- Reïna-Flor Okori – A track and field athlete from Equatorial Guinea who has represented her country in multiple Olympic Games.
