= Peter Parker (Marvel Cinematic Universe) =

Character in the Marvel Cinematic Universe

- Marvel Cinematic Universe character
- Tom Holland as Peter Parker / Spider-Man in Spider-Man: Far From Home (2019)
- First appearance: Captain America: Civil War (2016)
- Based on: Spider-Man by: Stan Lee; Steve Ditko
- Adapted by: Christopher Markus; Stephen McFeely
- Portrayed by: Tom Holland; Max Favreau (young)
- Voiced by: Hudson Thames (Disney+ animated shows)

In-universe information
- Full name: Peter Benjamin Parker
- Aliases: Spider-Man; Iron Spider; Night Monkey; Peter-One; Pete; Pedro; Friendly Neighborhood Spider-Man; Underoos
- Species: Human mutate
- Occupation: Vigilante
- Affiliation: Avengers; Stark Industries
- Weapon: Web-shooters (formerly); E.D.I.T.H. glasses (formerly)
- Significant others: Michelle "MJ" Jones-Watson (ex-girlfriend, in love with)
- Relatives: May Parker (aunt)
- Origin: Forest Hills, Queens
- Nationality: American
- Born: August 10, 2001
- Age: 14 (Civil War); 15 (Homecoming); 16 (Infinity War, Endgame, Far From Home); 17 (No Way Home); 22 (Brand New Day)
- Abilities: Superhuman strength, speed, reflexes, agility, coordination and balance; Ability to cling to solid surfaces; Accelerated healing; Genius level intellect; Proficient scientist and engineer; Full Arachnid DNA; Precognitive spider-sense ability; Organic webbing

Peter Benjamin Parker also known by his alias, Spider-Man, is a fictional character portrayed by Tom Holland in the Marvel Cinematic Universe (MCU) media franchise, based on the Marvel Comics superhero Spider-Man. Peter is initially depicted as a student at the Midtown School of Science and Technology who received spider-like and superhuman abilities after being bitten by a radioactive spider.

Peter initially uses his powers to fight crime as a teenaged vigilante in Queens with the help of his best friend Ned Leeds, coming into conflict with Adrian Toomes. He is mentored by Tony Stark who eventually recruits him into the Avengers during Thanos' invasion of Earth. Peter falls victim to the Blip, but is resurrected five years later and rejoins the Avengers. Following Stark's death, Peter is chosen as a successor, teaming up with Nick Fury, an alliance, which leads him into conflict with Quentin Beck, who reveals Peter's identity to the world, and those who were on his side. Peter elicits Stephen Strange's help to reverse this, which inadvertently causes the multiverse to fracture, bringing alternate versions of Spider-Man and their enemies onto Earth-616, resulting in the death of his Aunt May. To repair the damage, Strange casts a spell that permanently erases not only Beck's victory, but also the world's knowledge of Peter's civilian persona, including his relationships with his girlfriend MJ, as well as his friends and other superhero allies. Four years later, Parker has been anonymously protecting New York City as its celebrated hero Spider-Man, although struggles in his personal life. Due to the arrival of a mutant named Jean Grey, Peter must protect the city with the help of the Punisher. He also discovers that his powers are changing by new mutations.

Holland's version of the character is the successor to the incarnation portrayed by Tobey Maguire in Sam Raimi's Spider-Man trilogy (2002–2007) and the incarnation portrayed by Andrew Garfield in Marc Webb's The Amazing Spider-Man duology (2012–2014), both of whom reprise their roles and appear alongside Holland in Spider-Man: No Way Home (2021). Holland's performance in the role has received positive reviews, with his version of the character becoming a breakout hit among audiences and critics for his supporting role in Captain America: Civil War (2016), before evolving into being one of the MCU franchise's flagship characters by the release of Spider-Man: Homecoming (2017) and its sequels. Holland won several accolades for his portrayal of the character.

Peter is a central character in the MCU, appearing in seven films as of 2026. Alternate versions of Peter appear in the Disney+ animated television series What If...? (2021), Your Friendly Neighborhood Spider-Man (2025–present), and Marvel Zombies (2025), voiced by Hudson Thames.

== Fictional character biography ==
Peter Parker's story in the MCU takes place in the Earth-616 universe. (Note: The main MCU universe was established to be Earth-616 in Doctor Strange in the Multiverse of Madness (2022).) The fictional biography below also includes events that happened to Peter from other universes.

=== Early life ===
Peter Benjamin Parker was born on August 10, 2001, in Forest Hills, Queens, and is primarily raised by his Aunt May, after the passing of his Uncle Ben. At a young age, Peter is saved from Ivan Vanko's robotic drones by Iron Man, fueling his already strong admiration for him.

While attending high school at the Midtown School of Science and Technology in 2015, Peter is bitten by a radioactive spider, giving him superhuman abilities. He becomes the superhero Spider-Man by using his powers for good, and maintains a secret identity so his enemies can not attack his friends and family. At Midtown School, Peter is smart but is frequently bullied by Flash Thompson. He also befriends Ned Leeds, who has been his best friend since they were young. He constructs a homemade Spider-Man suit, designing it as a red and blue hoodie also equipped with his web-shooters.

=== Avengers' Civil War and The Vulture ===
In 2016, Peter is living with May in Queens, New York when he meets Tony Stark at his apartment, who reveals that he knows Peter is Spider-Man; Stark recruits him to join his conflict with Steve Rogers and sends Peter to Germany. There Peter is given a new Spider-Man suit designed by him and is brought to the Leipzig/Halle airport to aid Stark and his faction, consisting of James Rhodes, Natasha Romanoff, T'Challa, and Vision, against Rogers' team, consisting of Bucky Barnes, Sam Wilson, Clint Barton, Scott Lang, and Wanda Maximoff. Peter is a fan of Rogers despite them being on opposing sides, while Rogers likewise respects Peter's bravery. They briefly exchange where in New York they are from upon fighting. After incapacitating Barnes and Wilson, and helping to defeat a giant Lang, Peter is sent back to Queens.

Two months later, Peter continues to try to balance his life as a high school student and Spider-Man, but eagerly awaits his next mission from Stark and continuously texts Stark's driver and bodyguard Happy Hogan. After Peter returns home from operating as Spider-Man, Ned accidentally learns Peter's secret identity. Peter and Ned attend a school party hosted by his crush, senior student Liz, but leaves early to stop a drug deal by Jackson Brice and Herman Schultz, who planned to sell Chitauri weapons to Aaron Davis. Peter follows Brice and Schultz before being caught by their boss Adrian Toomes, who drops Peter into a nearby lake. Stark remotely saves Peter using one of his Iron Man armors, and warns Peter of further involvement with Toomes. On an academic decathlon trip to Washington, D.C., Peter and Ned disable the tracker on Peter's suit, and Peter intercepts Toomes on a Damage Control truck in Maryland, but gets knocked out and trapped in a Damage Control storage vault. He misses the decathlon, but rescues his class at the Washington Monument after a Chitauri core explodes. Back in New York, Peter captures Toomes' new buyer Mac Gargan aboard the Staten Island Ferry, but Toomes escapes and a malfunctioning weapon tears the ferry in half, which Peter attempts to briefly fix it before Stark arrives and saves the passengers. Stark confiscates Peter's suit as punishment for his recklessness, and Liz accepts to be Peter's homecoming date.

Later, while on his way to pick up Liz for the homecoming dance, Peter discovers Toomes is Liz's father and Toomes also deduces Peter is Spider-Man. Toomes gives Peter one final chance to not interfere with his business out of gratitude for Peter previously saving Liz's life, but Peter abandons Liz to stop Toomes from stealing a Damage Control cargo plane that is shipping equipment from Avengers Tower using his homemade suit. When Toomes' Vulture suit is damaged, Peter saves his life, but leaves him in a web for the DODC and Hogan to arrest. The next day at school, Liz is angry at Peter for abandoning her before tearfully informing him that she and her mother will be moving away since Toomes is imprisoned. Hogan brings Peter to Avengers Compound, where Stark congratulates him on defeating Toomes, admits he underestimated him and offers him a place in the Avengers, showcasing the newly developed Iron Spider armor with it. Peter declines the offer, preferring to focus on local activities in Queens. When Stark returns the Spider-Man suit to him, Peter puts it on, at which point a shocked May learns he is Spider-Man.

=== Joining the Avengers and fight against Thanos ===
In 2018, while headed on a field trip, Peter sees the Q-Ship above New York City and asks Ned to cover for him as he leaves the school bus. As Spider-Man, he helps Stark fight Cull Obsidian and follows Ebony Maw—who had captured Stephen Strange–to his spaceship. This prompts Stark to fly into space and rescue Peter, sending the Iron Spider armor to Peter. He and Stark rescue Strange and kill Maw, and Stark officially declares Peter an Avenger. The spaceship lands on the planet Titan, where Peter, Stark, and Strange are confronted by some members of the Guardians of the Galaxy, before they realize that they are both on the same side: stopping Thanos. Thanos eventually arrives and Peter helps subdue him along with Stark, Strange, Peter Quill, Drax, and Mantis. However, Quill attacks Thanos, making Peter lose his grip on removing the Infinity Gauntlet. Peter rescues an unconscious Quill, Drax, Nebula, and Mantis after Thanos throws Titan's moon at them. Thanos leaves and is successful in disintegrating half of all life, including Peter, in the Blip.

In 2023, Peter is restored to life and is brought via a portal to the destroyed Compound to assist the Avengers and their allies in defeating an alternate 2014 Thanos. Peter reunites with Stark, who later sacrifices his life to save the universe; Peter attends his funeral and returns to high school, having a heartfelt reunion with Ned.

=== European vacation and Mysterio ===
Eight months later in mid-2024, Peter goes to a charity event that May is putting together as Spider-Man but leaves it abruptly due to still reeling from Stark's death and getting asked a horde of questions. He decides to take a break from vigilantism and goes on a school trip to Europe with Ned and other classmates, where he plans to reveal his romantic feelings towards his classmate Michelle "MJ" Jones. In Venice, Peter and his classmates are attacked by a water monster but are saved by Quentin Beck. Peter is approached by Nick Fury, whose calls he had been fielding and who appoints Beck as his teammate in battling further element-based monsters (the "Elementals") throughout Europe. Fury gives Peter "E.D.I.T.H.", an artificial intelligence created by Stark to give to Peter. After defeating the Fire Elemental in Prague, Peter feels he "isn't ready to be the next Iron Man" and gives E.D.I.T.H. to Beck, who unbeknownst to Peter is a former disgruntled employee of Stark's.

Peter goes on a walk with MJ, and reveals his attraction to her, while MJ is able to deduce Peter's identity as Spider-Man. The pair discover Beck used holographic projectors to visually create the Elementals, and Peter goes to Berlin to warn Fury about Beck's deception. Beck catches wind of this and traps Peter in multiple illusions, and while impersonating Fury, tricks the latter into telling the names of the students that know his fraudulence. Peter is hit by a train and left for dead in the Netherlands, but calls Hogan and creates a new suit for himself using Stark's technology as he enters London to stop Beck, who has created an amalgamated Elemental using Stark Industries drones. Ned and MJ evacuate the students and fight with Hogan while Peter destroys those drones and approaches Beck. Beck attempts to kill Peter using the drones, but Peter manages to get a drone to shoot him, Beck beginning to bleed. Peter gets E.D.I.T.H. back, as Beck seemingly dies, and disables the drones. Peter and his classmates return to New York City, with he and MJ planning a date the following week.

=== Exposed secret identity and multiversal crisis ===
After swinging through the city, Peter and MJ witness a broadcast from J. Jonah Jameson of TheDailyBugle.net showing an edited video of Beck incriminating Peter for the London attack and revealing his identity as Spider-Man, much to the latter's shock. Peter, MJ, Ned, and May are interrogated by Damage Control. While the murder charges are dropped with lawyer Matt Murdock's help, Peter and his friends still grapple with negative publicity from Jameson and Beck supporters. Peter and May then move into Happy Hogan's apartment for their safety. After this, Ned, and MJ's applications to MIT are rejected in light of the controversy, Peter goes to the New York Sanctum to ask Stephen Strange for help. Strange, despite Wong's warnings, attempts to cast a spell that would make everyone forget Peter is Spider-Man, though Peter repeatedly tampers with it. He tries to convince an MIT administrator to reconsider his and his friends' applications before being attacked by Otto Octavius, who rips Peter's nanotechnology from his Iron Spider armor, which bonds with his mechanical tentacles and allows Peter to disable them. As the Green Goblin appears and attacks, Strange teleports Peter and Octavius to the Sanctum, where he explains that before he could contain the tampered spell, it summoned people from alternate universes who know Spider-Man's identity and which allowed the multiverse to be broken open. Strange orders Peter, MJ, and Ned to find and capture multiversal visitors; they locate and retrieve Max Dillon and Flint Marko, and later, Peter retrieves Norman Osborn from a F.E.A.S.T. building and discovers that the latter, Dillon, and Octavius were pulled from their universes just before their deaths. (Note: As depicted in Spider-Man (2002), Spider-Man 2 (2004), and The Amazing Spider-Man 2 (2014), respectively.) He refuses to send the villains home to their deadly fates in their original realities and traps Strange in the Mirror Dimension, stealing the spell, takes the villains to Hogan's apartment, and cures Octavius so he can bring back the nanotechnology to Peter.

The Green Goblin persona, having taken control of Osborn, convinces the uncured villains to betray Peter, and a fight ensues which culminates with Goblin fatally wounding May before escaping. Before she dies, May tells Peter that "with great power, there must also come great responsibility". After May's death, a bereaved Peter, whose guilt was accentuated by Jameson's gaslighting reporting, is ready to give up and send the villains to die; he is comforted by his friends and meets two alternate versions of himself that are later nicknamed "Peter-Two" and "Peter-Three". The alternate Peters share stories of losing loved ones and encourage Peter (later nicknamed "Peter-One") to fight in May's honor. They develop cures for the villains and lure the Lizard, Dillon, and Marko to the Statue of Liberty, managing to cure them. The Goblin appears and unleashes the contained spell, and an enraged Peter-One tries to kill him to avenge May's death before being stopped by Peter-Two. The former and Peter-Three inject the Goblin cure into him, curing Osborn from his Goblin persona.

Peter-One realizes that the only way to protect the multiverse is to erase himself from everyone's memory and requests that Strange do so, while promising MJ and Ned that he will find them again. Heartbroken about having to forget each other, he and MJ reclaim their love for one another and share a final passionate kiss. The spell is cast and everyone returns to their respective universes, with Peter-One saying goodbye to his alternate versions. A few weeks later, Peter visits MJ and Ned to reintroduce himself, but decides against it, not wanting to endanger them. While mourning at May's grave, he has a conversation with Hogan and is inspired to carry on, but decides to isolate himself from his fellow and allies superheroes to keep them safe, as he came to believe that he was dangerous to be around and he also understood that there are some people he shouldn't trust as Jameson and the DODC, due to the situation caused by Beck. Peter, having dropped out of school and moved into a new apartment, starts studying to get his GED and makes a new suit to resume his super-heroics as Spider-Man, who is once again seen as a hero.

=== Evolution of powers and conflict with Jean Grey ===
Over the course of the next four years, Peter anonymously protects New York City as Spider-Man while living a reclusive and isolated personal life. He crosses paths with several new supervillains, such as Boomerang, Tarantula, Tombstone, as well as members of the Hand, while also occasionally battles against Gargan, who now uses a mechanical suit and goes by the supervillain name "Scorpion". Peter also befriends Detective Jean DeWolff of the New York Police Department, who is supportive of his activities in helping the police take down the supervillains. Peter often checks on Ned's social media stories, keeping tabs of his and MJ's lives while they study at MIT. At one point, Peter also becomes acquainted with Frank Castle, after he saves the latter's life during an incident on Staten Island, and the two would occasionally cross paths.

In 2028, Peter intervenes when a tank rampages through the city and breaks into a DODC facility, stopping Castle in the process when his pursuit of the tank also endangers innocent lives. Peter discovers the tank's driver has been telepathically possessed, and the telepath jumps from person to person, evading capture. The telepath orchestrates the escape of Gargan, who had been in the DODC's custody. Peter inquires with Yelena Belova, who tells him someone has been repeatedly attacking the DODC in search of "V-Max". Peter questions the DODC director Bill Metzger, who claims ignorance of the telepath. Later, Peter has a chance encounter with Ned and MJ, who have moved back to New York after graduation; they do not recognize him, and Peter learns that MJ has a new boyfriend, causing him to return home in distress, only to collapse when he arrives. The next morning, he wakes up in a cocoon on the roof of his apartment building, with heightened senses and organic webs coming out of his wrists. Despite struggling with these new mutations, Peter intervenes when Gargan is spotted in the city. Gargan, possessed by the telepath, taunts Peter, who reacts with uncharacteristic violence.

Hoping to control his new mutations, Peter finds Dr. Bruce Banner to ask about the inhibitor device that suppresses the Hulk. After the discussion, Peter builds an inhibitor to suppress his newest mutations, as well as a universal inhibitor to depower the telepath. Before Peter can finalize the design, the telepath finds him at home and, after learning about MJ, threatens to hurt her. Peter races to MJ, whom the telepath possesses and attempts to kill. Peter concedes defeat after narrowly saving her, though he sees the telepath directly and takes a photo of her with his HUD. Peter takes MJ to Castle's hideout to keep her safe, where he deduces the telepath's identity as Jean Grey. With Castle's equipment and MJ's insight, Peter completes both inhibitors. When Jean attacks the DODC again, this time in person and using a possessed Hulk, Peter subdues her and she is taken into Metzger's custody. When Peter returns to Castle's home, MJ confronts him with the letter he wrote for her and Ned explaining the spell that erased their memories. Peter explains himself, but MJ apologizes because she truly does not know or remember him and cannot reciprocate his feelings. When Peter takes MJ home, she invites him into the apartment she shares with Ned, and the three spend time together. After hearing MJ describe the possession, Peter realizes Metzger lied to him about Jean, and inquires with Yelena once more, this time learning that Jean has a sister named Sara, who is a telepath like her and was captured by the DODC some time prior. Then races to the DODC headquarters to save her.

At the same time, Jean learns that Sara had died from being experimented on by the DODC. In a fit of rage, her psionic power expands, creating a barrier that engulfs the city and renders various New Yorkers within its radius immobilized. Peter is partially immune to Jean's abilities, allowing him to enter the DODC building. Jean rebuffs his attempts and forces him to fight possessed members of the Hand who are on the DODC's payroll. Peter removes his inhibitor and embraces his new mutations, gaining enhanced strength, enhanced speed and organic webs to defeat the Hand. When Peter reaches Jean, she enters his mind and experiences a loving memory with May, who accepted Peter's abilities but loved him for himself. Peter offers Jean understanding over the loss of Sara. Castle, outside the barrier's radius, attempts to shoot Jean from a distance using a sniper rifle, but Peter intercepts the shot, leaving him gravely injured. Castle later carries Peter to the hospital, who undergoes surgery. He later awakens and learns from Castle that Jean kept him alive until medical help arrived. In the aftermath, Jean quietly leaves the city, the DODC comes under investigation, and Peter vows he does not need to be alone to be Spider-Man.

Some time later, Peter encounters Ned once more, and this time he introduces himself while performing their signature handshake, with Ned remembering Peter, while MJ cries and sits on the high school rooftop with the necklace Peter gave her in Europe, meaning she remembers him too.

== Alternate versions ==
Other versions of Peter Parker are depicted in the alternate realities of the MCU multiverse.

=== Zombie outbreak ===
In an alternate 2018, Peter (marketed as Zombie Hunter Spider-Man) is among the survivors of a quantum virus outbreak which transforms the infected into zombies, and joins the survivors, consisting of Bucky Barnes, Kurt Goreshter, Sharon Carter, Hope van Dyne, Okoye, Happy Hogan, and Bruce Banner to the Grand Central Station to catch a train to Camp Lehigh, New Jersey. After meeting Vision and following a fight with a zombified Wanda Maximoff, he escapes with Scott Lang and T'Challa, taking the Mind Stone to Wakanda to put an end to the virus. However, they discover that all of Wakanda has been infected by a zombie Thanos, until they receive help from Thor, Rocket, and Groot, but they were annihilated. After T'Challa's sacrifice, the Infinity Stones are destroyed, releasing a surge of energy. Peter and Lang are saved by the remaining sorcerers of Kamar-Taj. They welcome Shang-Chi, Katy, Kamala Khan, Blade Knight and Valkyrie by saving them from the fall, and reveal to them that the energy of the Infinity Stones is being contained by Hulk, who has become "Infinity Hulk". Arriving to help defend the Hulk, Peter and the remaining heroes fall one by one.

=== "Peter-Two" ===
Years following the events of Spider-Man 3 (2007), Peter Parker's (portrayed by Tobey Maguire) relationship with Mary Jane "MJ" Watson had worked out despite past complications. Due to Strange's malfunctioned spell, Peter is brought into Earth-616 and subsequently begins searching for that universe's Peter. After meeting an alternate version of himself and comforting "Peter-One" over the loss of his aunt, the Spider-Men work together to cure the supervillains and Peter subsequently reunites with Octavius. Peter stops "Peter-One" from killing Green Goblin out of rage, having previously reminded him that revenge would not suffice May's death, but this leads to him being stabbed in the back and injured by Goblin, who is in turn cured by "Peter-One". Peter says goodbye to his alternate versions and returns to his universe.

=== "Peter-Three" ===
Years following the events of The Amazing Spider-Man 2 (2014), Peter Parker's (portrayed by Andrew Garfield) failure to save Gwen Stacy caused him to become bitter and overly aggressive and vengeful towards criminals, devoting most of his time to being Spider-Man. After Strange's malfunctioned spell, Peter is brought into Earth-616 and subsequently begins searching for that universe's Peter. After meeting an alternate version of himself and comforting "Peter-One" over the loss of his aunt, the Spider-Men work to cure the villains, with "Peter-One" curing Connors and Peter reconciling with Dillon, who was cured by Octavius. After Green Goblin destroys the contained spell, MJ falls from the scaffolding, but Peter saves her, bringing closure to his failure. Peter and "Peter-One" inject Osborn with a cure "Peter-Two" developed, curing him of his Green Goblin persona. Peter says goodbye to his alternate versions and returns to his universe with a renewed sense of heroism.

=== Six Armed Spider-Man ===
In an alternate timeline, Peter Parker sports four additional arms while fighting crime as Spider-Man.

=== Your Friendly Neighborhood Spider-Man ===
In an alternate 2015, Peter Parker is bitten by a spider created by Norman Osborn, who came to the past to bite him due to a temporal paradox caused by Dr. Stephen Strange time-traveling while he is fighting a symbiotic alien, which ends with the destruction of Midtown High during high school orientation. After developing spider-like powers and abilities, Peter decides to use them to fight crime as Spider-Man as he is sent to another school, Rockford T. Bales High School. A year later, Spider-Man saves Harry Osborn, causing him to get an internship at Oscorp, later being revealed to be a plan to find his alter ego. With Norman's mentorship, Peter gets a new suit, Harry discovers his identity and becomes his guy in the chair, and his best friend, Nico Minoru, discovers who he is. After his suit was destroyed by Scorpion and Peter discovered Norman's true nature, Peter was given his classic red and blue suit based on his own designs.

== Concept and creation ==
=== Background and development ===
The Marvel Comics character Peter Parker / Spider-Man first appeared in the fifteenth and final issue of Marvel's anthology comic book series Amazing Fantasy, which was published in August 1962. The issue was written by Marvel Comics editor and head writer Stan Lee and drawn and penciled by artist Steve Ditko; Lee wanted to create a character whom teens could identify with, and was influenced by pulp magazine crime fighter the Spider. He also took inspiration from seeing a spider climb up a wall. The character became popular during the 1960s, and was adapted into various forms of media–including five films by Sony Pictures from 2002 to 2014, starring Tobey Maguire in three films directed by Sam Raimi as Spider-Man and Andrew Garfield in two films directed by Marc Webb as the character.

Following the November 2014 hacking of Sony Pictures' computers, emails between Sony Pictures Entertainment co-chairman Amy Pascal and president Doug Belgrad were released stating that Marvel Studios wanted to include Spider-Man (whose film rights are licensed to Sony) in their Marvel Cinematic Universe (MCU) film Captain America: Civil War (2016), but talks between the studios concerning this were believed to have broken down. However, in February 2015, the studios reached a licensing deal for the use of Spider-Man in an MCU film, and reports indicated that the character would indeed appear in Civil War. According to the deal, Sony Pictures would continue to own, finance, distribute, and exercise final creative control over the Spider-Man films. Marvel Studios president Kevin Feige stated in April 2015 that they decided to not retell the character's origins in Civil War since there had been depicted twice previously with the Raimi and Webb films, so Marvel Studios was "going to take it for granted that people know that, and the specifics". Feige also stated that Marvel had been working to add Spider-Man to the MCU since at least October 2014. The following June, Feige clarified that the initial Sony deal does not allow the character to appear in any of the MCU television series, as it was "very specific... with a certain amount of back and forth allowed."

By August 2019, Marvel Studios and its parent company The Walt Disney Studios had spent several months discussing expanding their deal with Sony. The existing deal had Marvel and Feige produce the Spider-Man films for Sony and receive 5% of their revenue. Sony wanted to expand the deal to include more films while keeping the same terms of the original agreement. Disney expressed concern with Feige's workload producing the MCU already and asked for a 25–50% stake in any future films Feige produced for Sony. Unable to come to an agreement, Sony announced that it would be moving forward on the next Spider-Man film without Feige or Marvel's involvement. The next month, Sony Pictures Entertainment chairman Tony Vinciquerra confirmed the character would be integrated with Sony's own shared universe—Sony's Spider-Man Universe (SSU)—moving forward. MCU Spider-Man actor Tom Holland personally spoke to Disney CEO Bob Iger and Sony Pictures Motion Picture Group chairman Tom Rothman, partly making the companies return to negotiations. In late September, Sony and Disney announced a new agreement that would allow Marvel Studios and Feige to produce another MCU Spider-Man film–Spider-Man: No Way Home (2021)–with Amy Pascal. Disney was reportedly co-financing 25% of No Way Home in exchange for 25% of the film's profit, while retaining the character's merchandising rights. The agreement also allowed Holland's Spider-Man to appear in a future Marvel Studios film as well as crossing over to the SSU, with the latter interaction described as "a 'call and answer' between the two franchises as they acknowledge details between the two in what would loosely be described as a shared detailed universe."

In Spider-Man: Brand New Day, Parker goes through an existential crisis after losing his identity as Peter Parker. This begins fueling his mutations, such as obtaining organic webbing. This plotpoint is believed to be adapted from the "Man-Spider" storyline from the comics and Spider-Man: The Animated Series (1994).

=== Casting and appearances ===
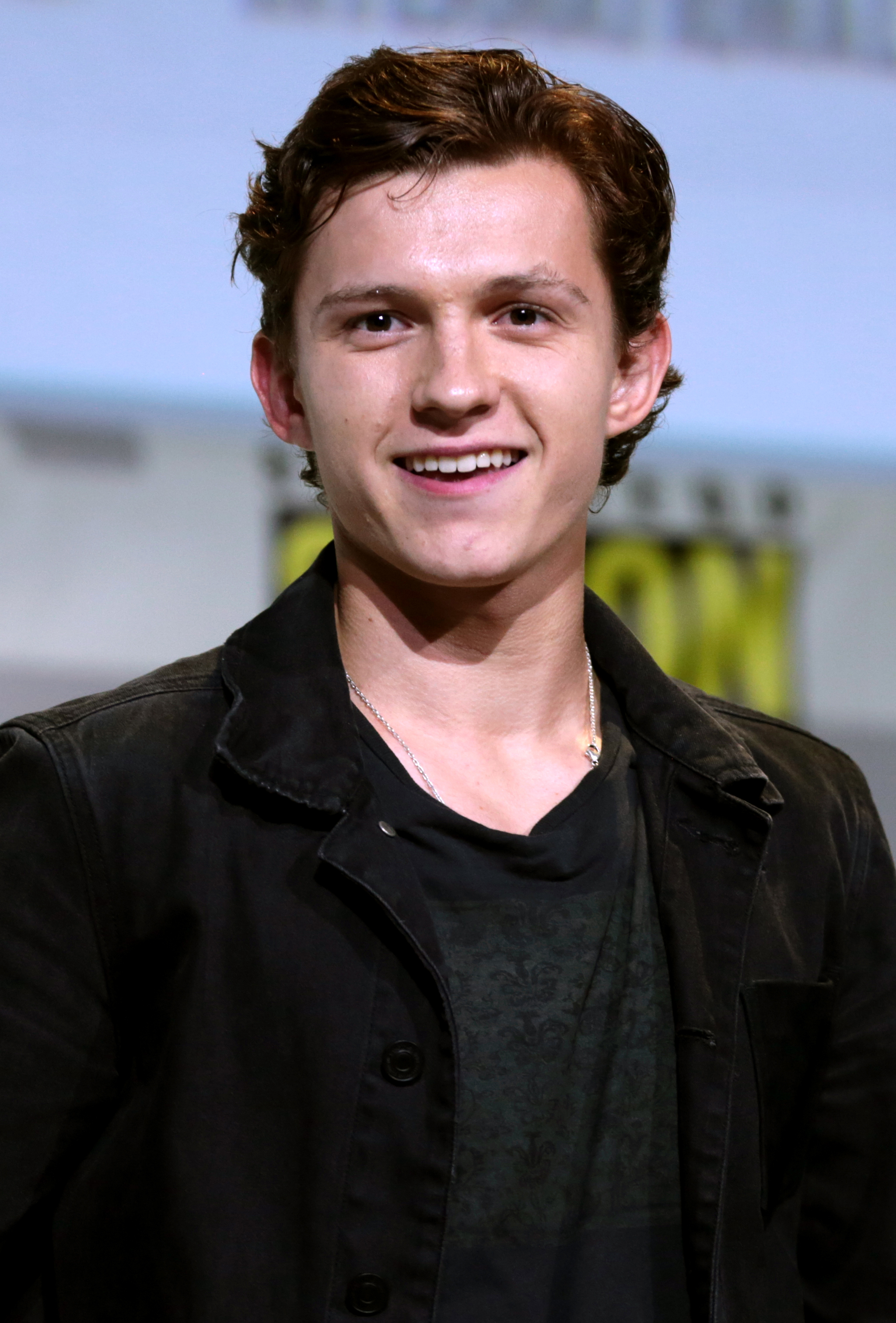
Tom Holland at the 2016 San Diego Comic-Con panel for Spider-Man: Homecoming

Sony was reportedly looking for an actor younger than Andrew Garfield to play Spider-Man, with Logan Lerman and Dylan O'Brien considered front-runners. Later in April 2015, Nat Wolff, Asa Butterfield, Tom Holland, Timothée Chalamet, and Liam James were under consideration by Sony and Marvel to play Spider-Man, with Holland and Butterfield as the front-runners. Butterfield, Holland, Judah Lewis, Matt Lintz (who would later be cast as Bruno Carreli in Ms. Marvel), Charlie Plummer, and Charlie Rowe screen tested for the lead role against Robert Downey Jr., who portrays Tony Stark / Iron Man in the MCU, for "chemistry". The six were chosen out of a search of over 1,500 actors to test in front of Feige, Pascal, and the Russo brothers—the directors of Captain America: Civil War. Feige and Pascal narrowed the actors considered to Holland and Rowe, with both screen testing with Downey again. Holland also tested with Chris Evans, who portrays Steve Rogers / Captain America in the MCU, and emerged as the favorite. On June 23, Marvel and Sony officially announced that Holland would star as Spider-Man in the MCU in Spider-Man: Homecoming (2017). The Russos "were pretty vocal" about whom they wanted for the role, pushing to cast an actor close to the age of Peter Parker to differentiate from the previous portrayals. They also praised Holland for having a dancing and gymnastics background.

A scene in Iron Man 2 (2010) depicts a young boy in a child's Iron Man mask targeted by Justin Hammer's drones before being rescued by Stark; Max Favreau, the son of director Jon Favreau, plays the boy. In 2017, Watts said that he had suggested to Feige that they retroactively establish this child to be the introduction of a young Peter to the MCU, an idea that Holland supported; however, this notion has yet to be confirmed in any MCU film or television series. The first reference to Spider-Man within the MCU, following the deal with Sony, is at the end of Ant-Man (2015) according to its director Peyton Reed. The reference is made by a reporter to Sam Wilson / Falcon, who is looking for Ant-Man. The reporter states, "Well, we got everything nowadays. We got a guy who jumps, we got a guy who swings, we got a guy who crawls up the walls, you gotta be more specific."

In February 2021, Holland said No Way Home was the final film under his contract but he hoped to continue playing Spider-Man in the future if asked. That October, Holland said No Way Home was being treated as "the end of a franchise" that began with Homecoming, with any additional solo films featuring the MCU Spider-Man characters to be different from the first trilogy of films and feature a tonal change. By November, Holland was unsure if he should continue making Spider-Man films and felt he would have "done something wrong" if he was still portraying the character in his thirties. He expressed interest in a film focusing on the Miles Morales version of Spider-Man instead. Despite this, Pascal hoped to continue working with Holland on future Spider-Man films. Later in November, Pascal said there were plans for another trilogy of Spider-Man films starring Holland, with work on the first of those about to begin, though Sony did not yet have official plans for further MCU Spider-Man films.

Tom Holland portrays Peter Parker in Captain America: Civil War, Spider-Man: Homecoming, Avengers: Infinity War, Avengers: Endgame, Spider-Man: Far From Home, Spider-Man: No Way Home, and Spider-Man: Brand New Day. Holland will reprise the role in the ensemble film Avengers: Doomsday. Hudson Thames voices alternate versions of the character in the Disney+ animated series What If...? (2021–2024), and Your Friendly Neighborhood Spider-Man (2025–present). Thames reprised his role in the Disney+ animated television series Marvel Zombies (2025).

=== Design ===
Top: The "Upgraded" suit used by Peter Parker in Spider-Man: Far From Home and Spider-Man: No Way Home, as depicted in the former
Bottom: A new homemade suit, inspired by the classic red & blue costume in the comics, as depicted in No Way Home

On the Spider-Man suit seen in Civil War, Joe Russo described it as "a slightly more traditional, Steve Ditko influenced suit," and that Civil War would explore the way the suit operates, particularly the mechanical eyes. This suit is primarily used during Homecoming, and has more technical improvements than the previous suits, including a remote drone attached to the chest logo, an AI system similar to Tony Stark's J.A.R.V.I.S., a holographic interface, a parachute, a tracking device for Stark to monitor Peter's location, a heater, underarm webbing that provided wingsuiting capabilities, the ability to light up, and a head-up display incorporating augmented reality. Stark incorporates a "training wheels" protocol into the suit's software to initially limit Peter's access to all of its features. Homecoming co-producer Eric Hauserman Carroll noted Marvel Studios went through the comics and "pull[ed] out all the sort of fun and wacky things the suit did" to include in the Homecoming suit. Spider-Man's web-shooters have various settings, first teased at the end of Civil War, which Carroll explained allowed him to "adjust the spray" to different settings like the spinning web, web ball, or ricochet web. He compared this to a DSLR camera. In The Moviemaking Magic of Marvel Studios: Spider-Man (2021), Holland says that "what [he] loves about the original web-shooters is they're as real as they could be", and compares them to Andrew Garfield's Spider-Man, saying that his web-shooters; "[never made] much sense to [him]." Spider-Man's Iron Spider armor, used by the character during the Civil War comic storyline, was also considered to appear in the Civil War film.

Spider-Man: Far From Home (2019) reuses two of Spider-Man's costumes from the previous films: his main costume from Captain America: Civil War and Spider-Man: Homecoming, and the Iron Spider armor from Avengers: Infinity War (2018) and Avengers: Endgame. It also introduces two new costumes: a black "stealth" costume given to Peter by Nick Fury, and a new, upgraded Spider-Man suit that Peter designs for himself at the end of the film. Marvel Studios' head of visual development Ryan Meinerding explained that Watts had wanted to include a suit inspired by the Spider-Man Noir version of the character, which led to the design of the more tactical stealth suit. He added that the suit represents Peter experimenting with being a new kind of superhero. Other tactical costumes from the comic books were looked at when developing this one, but Meinerding felt they looked less practical than the more straightforward Noir inspiration. The costume includes tactical goggles that can be flipped up. For Peter's new self-designed costume, Meinerding originally designed it with the idea that it would be made from Peter's webbing since that is the strongest material he has access to. Practical versions of the costumes were created by Ironhead Studio, who previously worked on The Amazing Spider-Man films. For Far From Home, Ironhead developed a skull cap for the costumes that has built-in fans to prevent the goggles from steaming up. They also developed a magnetic bellows system for connecting the goggles to the mask, so they could be easily removed but not fall off during action sequences.

Spider-Man suits featured in Your Friendly Neighborhood Spider-Man include his homemade suit made from "gym pants, sneakers, goggles, a blue sweatshirt, red undershirt, knee pads, very clunky webshooters, and a red logo on the chest", a "beetle" costume, a yellow suit, a dark suit, a "classic 60s" red and blue suit, and a white and blue Oscorp suit.

==== List of MCU Spider-Man suits ====
- The Homemade suit is a suit developed by Peter Parker during his early months as Spider-Man. It appears briefly in Captain America: Civil War and is used for the climax of Spider-Man: Homecoming. Trixter applied a rigging, muscle and cloth system to Sony Pictures Imageworks's homemade suit to "mimic the appearance of the rather loose training suit".
- The Homecoming suit was a suit developed by Tony Stark for Peter, described as an upgrade to the Homemade one. It first appears as Peter's primary suit in Civil War and Homecoming, Peter uses it briefly in Avengers: Infinity War, and the suit is blown up in Spider-Man: Far From Home. A variation of this suit appears in What If...?
- The Iron Spider armor, also known as Item 17A, was a suit developed by Stark that was made out of nanotechnology. The Department of Damage Control confiscate the charger in mid-2024, and Otto Octavius absorbs its nanites for his tentacles later that year; he eventually returns it to Peter. The armor appears at the end of Homecoming, is primarily used for Infinity War and Avengers: Endgame, at the start of Far From Home, and one time in Spider-Man: No Way Home. For the suit's first appearance, Framestore created models and textures in anticipation for future MCU projects, while Trixter created the "clean, high tech" vault that the suit appears in.
- The Stealth Suit is a suit made by Fury for Peter. Peter becomes the vigilante Night-Monkey, a "European rip-off of Spider-Man", to conceal his identity using this suit. A prison warden steals the mask in Netherlands. It appears in Spider-Man: Far From Home.
- The Upgraded Suit is a red-and-black Spider-Man suit created by Peter using the Stark Industries Fabricator. It also contains a white spider-emblem on the front and back. A burglar throws paint on the suit, which remains uncleanable until May Parker (Marisa Tomei) cleans it months later. It forms into the Integrated Suit when Octavius returns his stolen nanites he stole from the Iron Spider armor. It appears in Spider-Man: Far From Home and No Way Home.
- The Black and Gold Suit is the Upgraded Suit inside-out. Peter uses this suit to defeat Electro in No Way Home.
- The Integrated Suit is the Upgraded Suit combined with the Iron Spider armor's nanites. It appears in No Way Home.
- A new suit sewn by Parker is introduced during the ending of No Way Home and is featured throughout Spider-Man: Brand New Day, inspired by the original red-and-blue suit of the early Spider-Man comics. The screenplay for the former film mentions how its design was inspired by elements of his multiversal counterparts, Peter-Two and Peter-Three. A similar suit appears in Your Friendly Neighborhood Spider-Man.

== Characterization ==
Peter is recruited by Stark in Civil War to help him arrest Rogers and his rogue Avengers. Feige said that Peter would be torn between superhero ideologies, saying, "Does he want to be like these other characters? Does he want nothing to do with these other characters? How does that impact his experience, being this grounded but super powerful hero? Those are all the things that Stan Lee and Steve Ditko played with in the first 10 years of his comics, and that now we can play with for the first time in a movie." On aligning with Stark, Anthony Russo said that, despite entering the conflict after the two factions have formed and not having much political investment, Peter's choice comes from "a very personal relationship" he develops with Stark. The Russos hoped "to take a very logical and realistic and naturalistic approach to the character" compared to the previous film portrayals. Anthony Russo added that the character's introduction had to fit "that specific tonal stylistic world" of the MCU, as well as the tone established by the directors in Winter Soldier, saying, "It's a little more grounded and a little more hard-core contemporary." That was "coloring our choices a lot" with Peter.

Though the MCU films do not depict Peter's origin story, Peter's Uncle Ben, whose death was a significant event in both the comic books and previous film series, is indirectly referenced; there was some discussion to include a direct reference to Ben in Spider-Man: Homecoming when Peter is getting ready for his homecoming by the revelation that his wardrobe consisted of Ben's clothes, but the writers desisted because they felt that the moment veered away from Peter's character arc and made Ben's death feel like a "throwaway line". The one exception is the animated What If...? episode "What If... Zombies?!", where an alternate version of Peter mentions everyone who has died in his life in the episode's timeline.

Another change is Peter's close paternal relationship with Stark. This was partially adapted from the limited series Civil War, its three-issue prelude on The Amazing Spider-Man by J. Michael Straczynski until their fallout. In the Ultimate Marvel Universe, Spider-Man and Iron Man share a trainer-trainee relationship. Some critics disliked Peter's reliance on Stark, as opposed to previous cinematic portrayals of Spider-Man showing the character as more self-reliant; several of Peter's proper Spider-Man suits in the MCU are also designed by Stark, or built by Peter with Stark Industries technology, whereas in the comics Peter designed and constructed much of his suits entirely by himself while Stark only made the Iron Spider armor.

Peter's relationship with Gwen Stacy does not exist in the MCU, instead he falls in love with Michelle "MJ" Jones-Watson (Zendaya) a fellow school student after his previous crush, high school senior Liz, moves away. Although MJ is an original character, Spider-Man: Homecoming co-screenwriter John Francis Daley stated that she was intended as a reinvention of Mary Jane Watson and that the nickname was an homage to her. The Osborns, including Peter's best friend from the comics Harry Osborn, his father Norman Osborn and their company Oscorp doesn't exist in MCU as stated in Spider-Man: No Way Home by Norman Osborn from Sam Raimi's Spider-Man trilogy to May Parker. Ned Leeds is instead shown to be Peter's best friend, who in the comics is The Hobgoblin.

== Reception ==
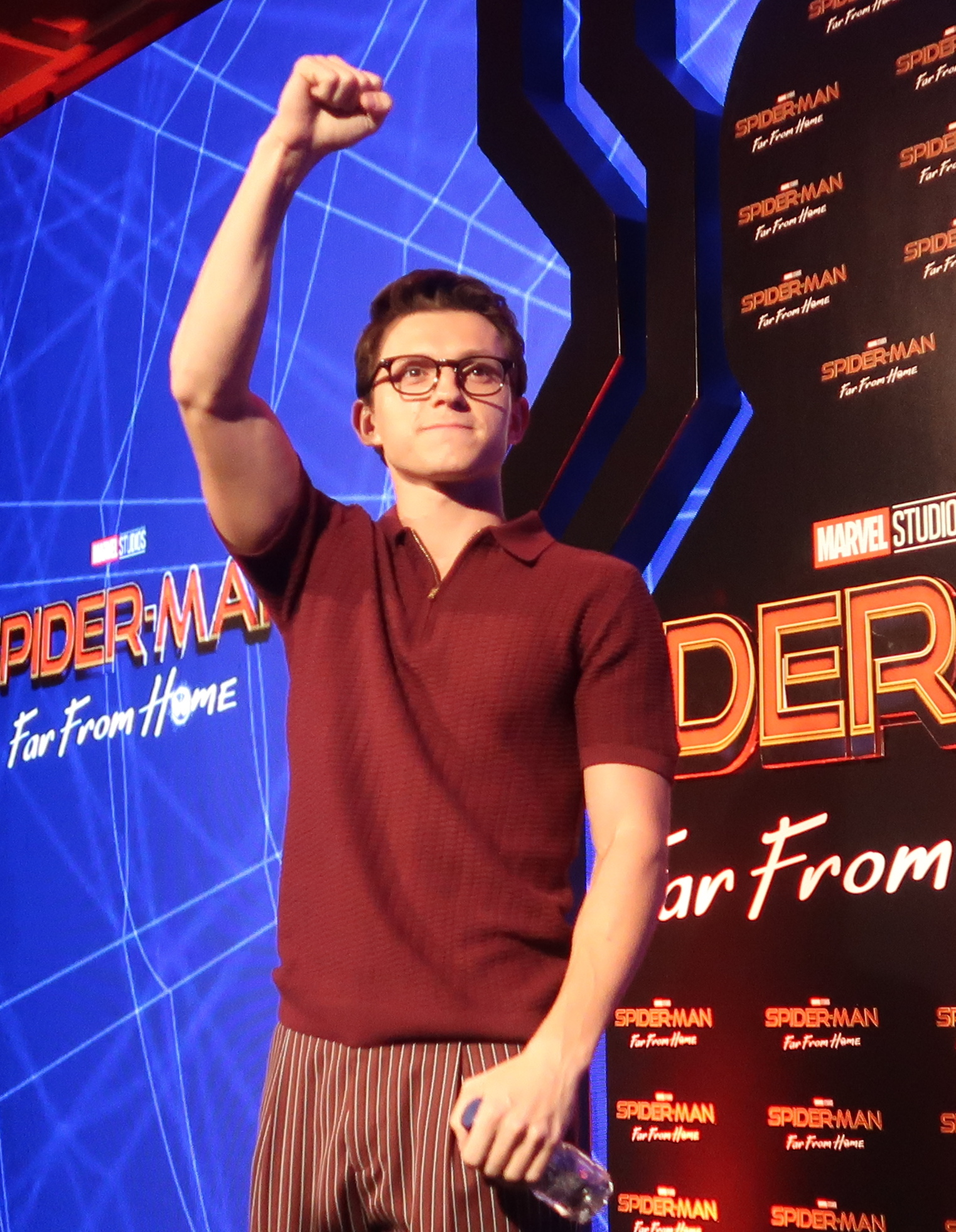
Tom Holland has received praise and several accolades for his performance as Spider-Man within the MCU.

For their reviews of Spider-Man: Homecoming, Sara Stewart of the New York Post attributed much of the "heavy-lifting" to Holland's performance and the "perfectly cast" Michael Keaton (Vulture). She also noted Watts' focus on Peter's human side, while Mike Ryan at Uproxx felt it was the best Spider-Man film yet, with one of his specific praises being the younger and more optimistic portrayal of Peter. Richard Roeper of the Chicago Sun-Times praised its focus on the character's school life and called Holland "terrific and well-cast", while Owen Gleiberman of Variety highlighted Homecoming's focus on making Peter Parker a realistically youthful and grounded character. He found Holland to be likable in the role, but did criticize the vague take on Spider-Man's origin and powers, but "the flying action has a casual flip buoyancy, and the movie does get you rooting for Peter." At IndieWire, David Ehrlich praised the elements of the film that leaned into the high school life of Peter, while Kenneth Turan of the Los Angeles Times criticized the "juvenile" depiction of Peter and Watts' "unevenly orchestrated" direction. Meanwhile, The Hollywood Reporter's John DeFore praised Holland's performance as "winning" despite the Homecoming script, and Mick LaSalle, writing for the San Francisco Chronicle, said the film did not explore the human side of Spider-Man enough and instead focused on action that is "not thrilling". Robbie Collin of The Telegraph criticized Watts' direction but was positive of Holland, Keaton, Tomei, and Zendaya.

For their reviews of Spider-Man: Far From Home, Gleiberman again praised Holland's performance, along with Roeper, while Alonso Duralde of TheWrap highlighted the cast, including the chemistry between Holland, Zendaya, and Jacob Batalon (Ned Leeds). Ehrlich criticized the character development of Spider-Man in the film, feeling that he does not change throughout the film beyond becoming more confident. John Anderson of The Wall Street Journal also praised Holland and Zendaya's performances.

Spider-Man: No Way Home features several characters from Sam Raimi's Spider-Man trilogy and Marc Webb's The Amazing Spider-Man duology, including past Spider-Man actors Tobey Maguire and Andrew Garfield as their respective Spider-Men. The multiverse aspect was widely praised by critics and audiences, and generated much speculation before the film's release. In their reviews, Don Kaye, writing for Den of Geek, praised the performances and chemistry of the cast, stating that "No Way Home channels the entire spectrum of Spider-Man movies while setting the character on a course all his own at last", while Pete Hammond of Deadline Hollywood praised Watts's direction and wrote that Holland, Zendaya, and Batalon are "a priceless trio"; Jennifer Bisset of CNET praised the performances, writing: "A Russo Brothers influence can almost be felt ushering Holland's third Spider-Man movie into new, weightier territory. If the character is to become the next Tony Stark, this is the way to etch a few more scars into a more interesting hero's facade"; DeFore felt that the inclusion of "multiversal mayhem" in No Way Home addressed the "Iron Man-ification" of MCU Spider-Man that made Holland-centric films "least fun"; Roeper again praised the performances of Holland and Zendaya, writing that while there is "nothing new or particularly memorable about the serviceable CGI and practical effects," he and the audience remain invested because Holland "remains the best of the cinematic Spider-Men".

=== Accolades ===
Holland has received numerous nominations and awards for his portrayal of Spider-Man.

Year	Film	Award	Category	Result	Ref.
2016	Captain America: Civil War	Golden Schmoes Awards	Breakthrough Performance of the Year	Won	
2016	Captain America: Civil War	Teen Choice Awards	Choice Movie: Scene Stealer	Nominated	
2017	Captain America: Civil War	Empire Awards	Best Male Newcomer	Nominated	
2017	Captain America: Civil War	Saturn Awards	Best Performance by a Younger Actor	Won	
2017	Spider-Man: Homecoming	London Film Critics' Circle Awards	Young British/Irish Performer of the Year	Nominated	
2017	Spider-Man: Homecoming	Teen Choice Awards	Choice Breakout Movie Star	Nominated	
2017	Spider-Man: Homecoming	Teen Choice Awards	Choice Summer Movie Actor	Won	
2018	Spider-Man: Homecoming	Saturn Awards	Best Performance by a Younger Actor	Won	
2018	Avengers: Infinity War	Teen Choice Awards	Choice Action Movie Actor	Nominated	
2019	Spider-Man: Far From Home	Teen Choice Awards	Choice Summer Movie Actor	Won	
2019	Spider-Man: Far From Home	Saturn Awards	Best Performance by a Younger Actor	Won	
2019	Spider-Man: Far From Home	People's Choice Awards	Male Movie Star of 2019	Nominated	
2019	Spider-Man: Far From Home	People's Choice Awards	Action Movie Star of 2019	Won	
2020	Spider-Man: Far From Home	Nickelodeon Kids' Choice Awards	Favorite Movie Actor	Nominated	
2020	Spider-Man: Far From Home / Avengers: Endgame	Nickelodeon Kids' Choice Awards	Favorite Superhero	Won	
2022	Spider-Man: No Way Home	Critics' Choice Super Awards	Best Actor in a Superhero Movie	Nominated	
2022	Spider-Man: No Way Home	Nickelodeon Kids' Choice Awards	Favorite Movie Actor	Won	
2022	Spider-Man: No Way Home	MTV Movie & TV Awards	Best Performance in a Movie	Won	
2022	Spider-Man: No Way Home	MTV Movie & TV Awards	Best Hero	Nominated	
2022	Spider-Man: No Way Home	MTV Movie & TV Awards	Best Kiss (Note: Shared with Zendaya.)	Nominated	
2022	Spider-Man: No Way Home	MTV Movie & TV Awards	Best Fight (Note: Shared with Tobey Maguire and Andrew Garfield.)	Nominated	
2022	Spider-Man: No Way Home	MTV Movie & TV Awards	Best Team	Nominated	
2022	Spider-Man: No Way Home	Saturn Awards	Best Actor	Nominated	
2026	Spider-Man: Brand New Day	Nickelodeon Kids' Choice Awards	Favorite Movie Actor	Won	

== In other media ==
=== Films ===
- At one point, the writers of the Sony Pictures Animation film Spider-Man: Into the Spider-Verse (2018) wished to include a post-credits scene with cameos by Maguire, Garfield, and Holland, but this was cut as Sony felt such a moment at the time was too risky and would prove confusing. Holland recalls his cameo was as a passerby at a train station who says "Hey, kid!" to Miles Morales.
  - The film's sequel, Spider-Man: Across the Spider-Verse (2023), references the events of No Way Home by having Miguel O'Hara / Spider-Man 2099 refer to Peter as "the little nerd back on Earth-199999". Co-director Kemp Powers later assured that the No Way Home reference was meant to be a throwaway line that Phil Lord and Christopher Miller came up with to add humor to their films, claiming that it has no connections to the MCU.
- The MCU's Spider-Man has made an appearance and been referenced in the SSU, a standalone media franchise and shared universe connected to the MCU through the multiverse. The films in the SSU focus on supporting characters featured in Spider-Man comics, with a particular emphasis on his rogues gallery.
  - Holland had filmed a cameo appearance as Peter Parker for Venom (2018), prior to Marvel Studios asking Sony to exclude it.
  - Holland makes a cameo appearance as Peter Parker in the mid-credits scene of Venom: Let There Be Carnage (2021), where it is revealed that J. Jonah Jameson's broadcast incriminating him as Mysterio's "murderer" was witnessed by a universe-displaced Eddie Brock and his symbiote companion Venom, simultaneous with the events of No Way Home.
  - Spider-Man and the events of No Way Home are referenced and depicted in the mid and post-credit scenes of Morbius (2022), by the revelation of Adrian Toomes being transported from the MCU to the Sony's Spider-Man Universe due to Strange's second spell. Assuming Spider-Man was responsible, he constructs a new Vulture suit and approaches Dr. Michael Morbius in forming a team.
  - In April 2024, Sebastian Meyer released part of the concept art for Madame Web (2024), showing Holland's Spider-Man fighting Ezekiel Sims.

=== Comics ===
- An alternate Spider-Man wearing a version of the Homecoming Stark suit appears in the comics crossover event Spider-Geddon (2018), implied to be the MCU version of Spider-Man.
- An alternate Spider-Man wearing a version of the Infinity War Iron Spider armor appears in the third volume of the second Spider-Verse event (2019), alongside a version of the MCU Iron Man.

=== Video games ===
- Most of the major MCU Spider-Man suits are available in the 2018 video game Marvel's Spider-Man, initially developed by Insomniac Games for PlayStation 4. The suits created for No Way Home, the Integrated and Black/Gold Suits, are exclusive to the PlayStation 5 and Microsoft Windows version of the game, Marvel's Spider-Man Remastered (2020). The Homecoming suit is named the "Stark Suit" in-game, the Far From Home suit is named the "Upgraded Suit", and the Integrated Suit is named the "Hybrid Suit".
  - All 7 MCU suits return as alternate suits for Peter Parker in the PlayStation 5 game Marvel's Spider-Man 2 (2023), with the Stark Suit being renamed to the "Upgraded Classic Suit". In addition, the suit as seen in the ending of No Way Home is also available to unlock and is named the "New Red And Blue Suit" in-game. Parker's main suit from Brand New Day, named the "Fresh Start Suit" in-game, was added in a free update in July 2026.
- Holland's Spider-Man and Zendaya's MJ, based on their appearances in No Way Home, are purchasable outfits in Fortnite.
- The main suits from Homecoming and Far From Home, as well as the MCU's version of the Iron Spider armor, are all featured as downloadable content (DLC) costumes for Spider-Man in Square Enix's Avengers (2020) game on PlayStation 4 and PlayStation 5.
- The MCU version of the Iron Spider armor appears in Marvel Rivals (2024) as a purchaseable suit inspired by the Marvel Cinematic Universe film Spider-Man: No Way Home (2021) for Spider-Man. The Brand New Day suit was also added later to promote the film's release.

=== Theme parks ===
Holland reprises his role as Peter Parker / Spider-Man for the attraction Web Slingers: A Spider-Man Adventure in Avengers Campus at Disney California Adventure and Walt Disney Studios Park.

== See also ==
- Characters of the Marvel Cinematic Universe
- Spider-Man in film
