= Ugochukwu =

Ugochukwu and its hybrid and history in the scob
- Gender: Male

Origin
- Origin: Igbo/Anioma
- Meaning: God's Eagle (Crown of God) Honour Bestowed Upon Me By Almighty God
- Region of origin: eastern Nigeria

Other names
- Related names: Ugochi, Ugo, Chinyereugo, Ugonna, Ugomma (female), Adaugo (female), Chukwuyenumugo (Chiyenumugo)

Ugochukwu audio is an Igbo name. Its literal translation is "God's Eagle", which is interpreted as "Crown of God" or even "Glory of God" — since the crowns of traditional Igbo rulers are adorned with a tail feather of an eagle.

== Men with this given name ==
- Ugo Amadi (born 1997), American football player
- Ugo Ihemelu (born 1983), Nigerian-born American football player
- Ugo Monye (born 1983), English sports pundit and former rugby union footballer
- Ugo Okoye (born 1981), Nigerian footballer
- Ugo Ukah (born 1984), Italian-Nigerian footballer

== Women with this given name ==
- Ugo Oha (born 1982), Nigerian basketball player

== People with this family name ==
- John Ugochukwu (born 1988), Nigerian footballer
- Lesley Ugochukwu (born 2004), French footballer
- Magalan Ugochukwu (born 1990), Nigerian footballer
- Mathias Ugochukwu (1926–1990), prominent Nigerian businessman
- Onyema Ugochukwu (born 1944), Nigerian economist and politician
- Ugo Ugochukwu (born 2007), American racing driver
