= Paul Okoye =

Paul Okoye may refer to:

- Paul Okoye (singer) (born 1981), Nigerian singer
- Paul Okoye (promoter) (born 1967), Nigerian event promoter, talent manager, record exec, philanthropist and business man

== See also ==
- Okoye (disambiguation)
