= Ihemelu =

- Gender: male
- Language: Igbo

Origin
- Origin: Igbo
- Meaning: something happened
- Region of origin: Igboland

Other names
- Alternative spelling: Ifemelu

Ihemelu audio is a male given name of the Igbo people of Nigeria. It's broken down as "Ihe + melu" and the direct English translation is "something happened". Variants of this name are Ifemelu or "Ihemere" (Ihe + mere) and the name is believed to be a prevalent surname in Nigeria.

== Names ==
Notable people with the name include:

- Ugo Ihemelu, Nigerian-born American footballer
