= Igbo names and naming traditions =

Igbo names are traditionally and historically constructed. In this convention there are no family names, instead one is known through their immediate male lineage.

In the olden days, Igbos – men and women – were named after the four market days (eke, orie, afor, and nkwo) in Igboland. Examples: Mgbọafọ, Mgborie, Nwanyinkwọ, Mgbeeke, Nkwọja, and Ugweke for women, while the men were named Okonkwọ, Okorie, Okoeke, Okoafọ, Okoroafọ.

== Naming ==
In the Igbo naming convention a child is given a name at birth referencing an event surrounding the birth, a deceased ancestor, or the time and/or place of birth. This is the name they will primarily be known by. To differentiate from others in the same generation with the same name a person will also give their father's first name. The first Westerners to communicate with the Igbo often confused this for a surname (family name), however, unlike a surname, it is not passed on to the next generation as a "second name".

This system extended even into marriage. Unlike in some Western countries, the woman does not always change her name. In the event that she did, it would be to her husband's first name.

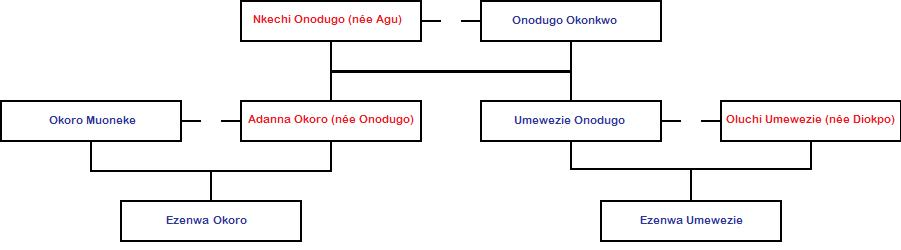
Example of an Igbo family tree explained below.

In the example above, the progenitors, Onodugo and Nkechi, may be differentiated from others in their generation by his and her father's name. For example, Onodugo and Nkechi have fathers with first names Okonkwo and Agu respectively. They are the father and mother of a daughter, and son who are each married. The son and daughter each had a child. The first who had a child would name their child Ezenwa. The next sibling to have a child would almost always give their child a different first name, since it is against custom to name a child after a living family member, especially one in the same or previous generation. Ezenwa and his cousin would each get their fathers first name for their last. After marriage, Nkechi, Adanna and Oluchi are known either by their fathers' or husbands' first names.

In the beginning and middle of the 20th century, after the spread of Christianity, this method was almost completely dropped in favor of adopting the grandfather's name (father's "last name") as a surname. In many cases, either an English name or the father's first name becomes the child's middle name.
