= Jayden Jackson =

American football player

No. 65 – Oklahoma Sooners
- Position: Defensive tackle
- Class: Junior

Personal information
- Listed height: 6 ft 2 in (1.88 m)
- Listed weight: 310 lb (141 kg)

Career information
- High school: IMG Academy (Bradenton, Florida)
- College: Oklahoma (2024–present)
- Stats at ESPN

Jayden Jackson is an American college football defensive tackle for the Oklahoma Sooners.

== Early life ==
Jackson attended IMG Academy in Bradenton, Florida. He was selected to play in the 2024 Polynesian Bowl. He committed to the University of Oklahoma to play college football.

== College career ==
Jackson entered his true freshman season at Oklahoma in 2024 as a starter becoming the first true freshman defensive lineman to start for the Sooners since Tommie Harris in 2001. Overall, he started 10 of 13 games, recording 30 tackles and two sacks. He returned to Oklahoma for his sophomore year in 2025.
