= Billy Bowman Jr. =

American football player (born 2003)

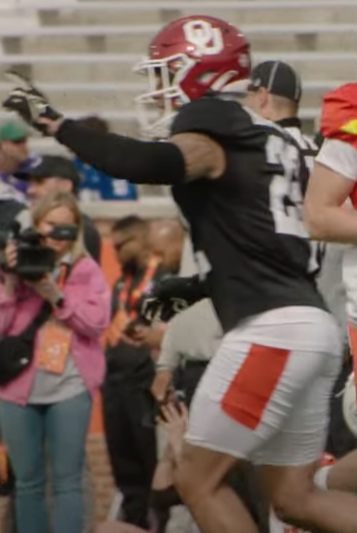
- Bowman at the 2025 Senior Bowl

No. 33 – Atlanta Falcons
- Position: Safety
- Roster status: Active

Personal information
- Born: January 29, 2003 (age 23)
- Listed height: 5 ft 10 in (1.78 m)
- Listed weight: 194 lb (88 kg)

Career information
- High school: Billy Ryan (Denton, Texas)
- College: Oklahoma (2021–2024)
- NFL draft: 2025: 4th round, 118th overall pick

Career history
- Atlanta Falcons (2025–present)

Awards and highlights
- First-team All-Big 12 (2023)

Career NFL statistics as of Week 5, 2026
- Total tackles: 31
- Sacks: 1.5
- Pass deflections: 4
- Interceptions: 1
- Stats at Pro Football Reference

Billy Bowman Jr. (born January 29, 2003) is an American professional football safety for the Atlanta Falcons of the National Football League (NFL). He played college football for the Oklahoma Sooners and was selected by the Falcons in the fourth round of the 2025 NFL draft.

== Early life ==
Bowman Jr. attended Billy Ryan High School in Denton, Texas. He played defensive back and wide receiver in high school. As a senior, he had 86 receptions for 1,207 yards and 15 touchdowns. He was selected to play in the 2021 Under Armour All-America Game. Bowman Jr. originally committed to play college football at the University of Texas at Austin before switching to the University of Oklahoma.

== College career ==
As a true freshman at Oklahoma in 2021, Bowman Jr. started seven of 11 games and had 22 tackles. As a sophomore in 2022, he played in 11 games with nine starts and recorded 60 tackles and three interceptions. He returned to Oklahoma as a starter in 2023.

== Professional career ==
Pre-draft measurables
Height	Weight	Arm length	Hand span	Wingspan	40-yard dash	10-yard split	20-yard split	Vertical jump	Broad jump	Bench press
5 ft 9 7/8 in (1.77 m)	192 lb (87 kg)	28 1/2 in (0.72 m)	8 5/8 in (0.22 m)	5 ft 10 3/4 in (1.80 m)	4.42 s	1.52 s	2.59 s	35.5 in (0.90 m)	10 ft 3 in (3.12 m)	17 reps
All values from NFL Combine

Bowman was selected by the Atlanta Falcons in the fourth round (118th overall) of the 2025 NFL draft. He made six appearance (one start) for Atlanta, recording one interception, two pass deflections, one forced fumble, 1.5 sacks, and 26 combined tackles. On November 22, 2025, Bowman was placed on injured reserve due to an Achilles injury. Two days later, it was confirmed that Bowman had suffered a torn Achilles tendon, officially ending his season.

== NFL career statistics ==
=== Regular season ===
Year	Team	Games		Tackles				Interceptions						Fumbles	
Year	Team	GP	GS	Comb	Solo	Ast	Sck	PD	Int	Yds	Avg	Lng	TDs	FF	FR
2025	ATL	6	1	26	15	11	1.5	2	1	0	0.0	0	0	1	0
2026	ATL	3	0	5	4	1	0.0	2	0	0	0.0	0	0	0	0
Career		9	1	31	19	12	1.5	4	1	0	0.0	0	0	1	0

== Personal life ==
On December 31, 2023, Bowman became engaged to Oklahoma Sooners softball All-American Jayda Coleman.
