= Danny Okoye =

American football player (born 2004)

- Okoye in 2026

No. 16 – Oklahoma Sooners
- Position: Defensive lineman
- Class: (redshirt) Sophomore

Personal information
- Born: September 19, 2004 (age 22)
- Listed height: 6 ft 3 in (1.91 m)
- Listed weight: 257 lb (117 kg)

Career information
- High school: NOAH (Tulsa, Oklahoma)
- College: Oklahoma (2024–present)
- Stats at ESPN

Danny Okoye (born September 19, 2004) is an American college football defensive lineman for the Oklahoma Sooners.

== Early life ==
Okoye was homeschooled and played high school football for the Northeast Oklahoma Association of Homeschools (NOAH) in Tulsa, Oklahoma. As a junior, he recorded six sacks, 16 tackles for loss, and one forced fumble. Regarded as the top high school recruit in Oklahoma, Okoye committed to play college football at the University of Oklahoma.

== College career ==
Okoye played sparingly in 2024, appearing in two games and earning a redshirt. Against Kent State the following season, he recorded his first career sack. Okoye finished the 2025 season with six tackles and two sacks. Entering the 2026 season, Okoye was expected to take on a larger role after his performance in 2025.
