= Ugo Okoye =

Nigerian footballer

Personal information
- Full name: Ugochukwu Okoye
- Date of birth: 13 September 1981 (age 45)
- Place of birth: Anambra State, Nigeria
- Height: 5 ft 6 in (1.68 m)
- Position: Midfielder

Senior career*
Years	Team	Apps	(Gls)
2005–2006	Charleston Battery	34	(1)
- * Club domestic league appearances and goals

Ugochukwu "Ugo" Okoye (born 13 September 1981) is a Nigerian former professional footballer who played as a midfielder.

== Career ==
Born in Anambra State, Okoye played in the United States for the Charleston Battery, scoring one goals in 34 league appearances during the 2005 and 2006 seasons.
