= Okorie =

- Gender: Male
- Language: Igbo

Origin
- Origin: Nigeria
- Region of origin: South east Nigeria

Okorie audiois a Nigerian surname of Igbo origin. The surname means "born on Orie" in Igbo, with Orie being one of the days of the Igbo week. Okorie is a Nigerian native name of the Igbo tribe, which represents a strong male son of the land, born on a pronounced Great Market Day called Orie.

== Notable people ==
Notable people with the surname include:

- Angela Okorie, Nigerian actress
- Chima Okorie (born 1968), Nigerian former footballer
- Domingo Okorie, Nigerian professor of chemistry
- Ukachukwu Okorie Biafran-born Irish writer, poet and publisher
- Ikechukwu Okorie (born 1993), Nigerian footballer
- Melatu Uche Okorie (born 1975), Nigerian-born Irish author
- Nick Okorie (born 1988), American professional basketball player
- Patrick Nnaemeka Okorie (born 1990), Nigerian singer and songwriter known by the stage name Patoranking
