= 2024 Missouri Tigers football team =

American college football season

2024 Missouri Tigers football

Music City Bowl champion

Music City Bowl, W 27–24 vs. Iowa
- Conference: Southeastern Conference

Ranking
- Coaches: No. 20
- AP: No. 22
- Record: 10–3 (5–3 SEC)
- Head coach: Eliah Drinkwitz (5th season)
- Offensive coordinator: Kirby Moore (2nd season)
- Offensive scheme: Pistol
- Defensive coordinator: Corey Batoon (1st season)
- Co-defensive coordinator: D. J. Smith (3rd season)
- Base defense: 4–2–5
- Home stadium: Faurot Field

2024 Southeastern Conference football standings
	Conf.			Overall
Team	W		L	W		L
No. 4 Texas y^	7	–	1	13	–	3
No. 6 Georgia y$^	6	–	2	11	–	3
No. 9 Tennessee ^	6	–	2	10	–	3
No. 22 Missouri	5	–	3	10	–	3
No. 11 Ole Miss	5	–	3	10	–	3
No. 17 Alabama	5	–	3	9	–	4
No. 19 South Carolina	5	–	3	9	–	4
LSU	5	–	3	9	–	4
Texas A&M	5	–	3	8	–	5
Florida	4	–	4	8	–	5
Arkansas	3	–	5	7	–	6
Vanderbilt	3	–	5	7	–	6
Oklahoma	2	–	6	6	–	7
Auburn	2	–	6	5	–	7
Kentucky	1	–	7	4	–	8
Mississippi State	0	–	8	2	–	10
Championship: Georgia 22, Texas 19 ^{OT}
^ – College Football Playoff participant; $ – Conference champion; y – Championship game participant; Rankings from AP Poll

The 2024 Missouri Tigers football team represented the University of Missouri in the Southeastern Conference (SEC) during the 2024 NCAA Division I FBS football season. The Tigers were led by Eliah Drinkwitz in his fifth season as their head coach.

The Missouri football team played its home games at Faurot Field in Columbia, Missouri. The SEC eliminated the divisions format starting with the 2024 season; teams who played their first year in the conference in 2024 included Texas and Oklahoma.

On December 21, 2023, extensions for defensive coordinator Blake Baker and offensive coordinator Kirby Moore were announced. On December 31, 2023, the University of Missouri announced a contract extension for Eli Drinkwitz through the 2028 season. On January 5, 2024, Baker was hired by LSU to be their defensive coordinator in a contract that would make him the highest paid assistant coach in college football. Defensive end coach Kevin Peoples also followed Baker to LSU. Baker was replaced by South Alabama defensive coordinator Corey Batoon on January 26, 2024, with Houston defensive end coach Brian Early replacing Peoples. Missouri is coming off an 11–2 season and a 14–3 Cotton Bowl Classic victory over Ohio State in the 2023 season.

Missouri was predicted to finish 6th in the SEC by media covering SEC Football Media Days in Dallas, Texas, with Luther Burden III named to the preseason first-team All-SEC. Expectations were high going into the season, as the Tigers had college football playoff aspirations following the success of the 2023 season and many returning starters (such as Brady Cook, Luther Burden III, and Theo Wease Jr.), as well as key transfer portal additions.

Missouri began the season ranked No. 11 in both the Preseason Coaches Poll and the AP poll. The Tigers began the season 4–0 after closer-than-expected wins over No. 24 Boston College and Vanderbilt. Following a bye in Week 5, Missouri was dominated by No. 25 Texas A&M in College Station, losing 41–10. The lopsided loss had major ramifications for the Tigers in the polls, as they tumbled from No. 9 all the way to No. 21 in the AP Poll following the loss. Missouri rebounded with wins over UMass and Auburn to improve to 6–1, but starting QB Brady Cook and starting RB Nate Noel suffered injuries in the Auburn win. Missouri was shutout 34–0 against Alabama in Tuscaloosa in Week 9, in which Cook broke the wrist on his throwing hand and left the game in the second quarter. After the loss to Alabama, the Tigers completely fell out of the AP Top 25, although they would debut at No. 24 in the College Football Playoff rankings. Backup QB Drew Pyne led the Tigers to a wild back-and-forth victory over Oklahoma in Week 11, improving Missouri to 7–2 and keeping their slim playoff chances alive. Those playoff chances would be extinguished in the following week as Missouri rallied from a 21–6 halftime deficit only to blow a 3-point lead in the final minute to fall to South Carolina. The Tigers would defeat Mississippi State and Arkansas in their final two games to finish the regular season 9–3 and 5–3 in the SEC. Mizzou was chosen to compete in the Music City Bowl, where they defeated the 8–4 Iowa Hawkeyes of the Big Ten at Nissan Stadium in Nashville, Tennessee by the score of 27–24. This win earned the Tigers back-to-back 10+ win and top 25 seasons for the first time since 2013–2014.

This season marked the first season since 2010 that the Tigers went undefeated at home and the first season since 1979 that each home game was sold out. The Tigers also set a record for most wins at home during a season with 7 wins.

== Offseason ==
=== Departures ===
2024 Missouri offseason departures
Name	Position	Notes
Ennis Rakestraw Jr.	CB	Declared for 2024 NFL draft
Jaylon Carlies	S	Declared for 2024 NFL Draft
Ty'Ron Hopper	LB	Declared for 2024 NFL Draft
Kris Abrams-Draine	CB	Declared for 2024 NFL Draft
Nyles Gaddy	DE	Declared for 2024 NFL Draft
Jayden Jernigan	DT	Declared for 2024 NFL Draft
Harrison Mevis	K	Declared for 2024 NFL Draft
Cody Schrader	RB	Graduated/Declared for 2024 NFL Draft
Darius Robinson	DL	Graduated/Declared for 2024 NFL Draft
Javon Foster	OT	Graduated/Declared for 2024 NFL Draft
Chad Bailey	LB	Graduated
Xavier Delgado	G	Graduated/Declared for 2024 NFL Draft
Nate Peat	RB	Graduated
Realus George Jr.	DT	Graduated
Gabarri Johnson	QB	Transferred to Oregon State
Tyler Hibbler	S	Entered Transfer Portal
Xavier Simmons	LB	Transferred to Charlotte
Demariyon Houston	WR	Entered Transfer Portal
Carmycah Glass	LB	Transferred to Louisiana
EJ Ndoma-Ogar	IOL	Transferred to Arkansas State
Valen Erickson	OT	Transferred to NC State
DJ Wesolak	EDGE	Transferred to Oregon State
Dameon Wilson	LB	Transferred to East Carolina
Max Whisner	TE	Transferred to Akron
Ma'Kyi Lee	OL	Transferred to North Texas
Jake Garcia	QB	Transferred to East Carolina
Riley Williams	P	Entered Transfer Portal
Chance Luper	WR	Entered Transfer Portal
Ryan Hoerstkamp	TE	Entered Transfer Portal
Ky Montgomery	DL	Transferred to Ball State
Michael Cox	RB	Entered Transfer Portal
Daniel Hull	K	Transferred to Eastern Michigan
Dannis Jackson	WR	Entered Transfer Portal
Serigne Tounkara	DL	Entered Transfer Portal

=== Incoming transfers ===
Name	Position	Eligibility Remaining	Previous School
Marcus Carroll	RB	1 year	Georgia State
Toriano Pride	CB	2 years	Clemson
Cayden Green	OT	3 years	Oklahoma
Darris Smith	LB	2 years	Georgia
Corey Flagg Jr.	LB	1 year	Miami
Orion Phillips	P	2 years	Murray State
Chris McClellan	DT	2 years	Florida
Nate Noel	RB	1 year	Appalachian State
Sterling Webb	DT	2 years	New Mexico State
Zion Young	DE	2 years	Michigan State
Drew Pyne	QB	3 years	Arizona State
Harold Blood	QB	1 year	Southern
Brady Hultman	LB	4 years	Wyoming
Marcus Bryant	OT	1 year	SMU
Jeremiah Beasley	LB	5 years	Michigan
Eddie Kelly	DL	2 years	Georgia Tech
Khalil Jacobs	LB	2 years	South Alabama

=== 2024 recruiting class ===
College recruiting
Name	Hometown	School	Height	Weight	Commit date
Williams Nwaneri; DE	Lee's Summit, Missouri	Lee's Summit North High School	6 ft 7 in (2.01 m)	260 lb (120 kg)	Aug 14, 2023
Williams Nwaneri; DE	Recruit ratings: Rivals: 247Sports: On3: ESPN: (91)				
Courtney Crutchfield; WR	Pine Bluff, Arkansas	Pine Bluff High School	6 ft 1 in (1.85 m)	185 lb (84 kg)	Dec 19, 2023
Courtney Crutchfield; WR	Recruit ratings: Rivals: 247Sports: On3: ESPN: (81)				
Kewan Lacy; RB	Lancaster, Texas	Lancaster High School	5 ft 11 in (1.80 m)	195 lb (88 kg)	Dec 14, 2023
Kewan Lacy; RB	Recruit ratings: Rivals: 247Sports: On3: ESPN: (79)				
James Madison II; WR	Fort Lauderdale, Florida	St. Thomas Aquinas High School	6 ft 3 in (1.91 m)	190 lb (86 kg)	Jul 4, 2023
James Madison II; WR	Recruit ratings: Rivals: 247Sports: On3: ESPN: (80)				
Elias Williams; DE	Hudson, Florida	Hudson High School	6 ft 4 in (1.93 m)	275 lb (125 kg)	Sep 1, 2023
Elias Williams; DE	Recruit ratings: Rivals: 247Sports: On3: ESPN: (78)				
Brian Huff; LB	Jonesboro, Arkansas	Valley View High School	6 ft 3 in (1.91 m)	215 lb (98 kg)	Jul 12, 2023
Brian Huff; LB	Recruit ratings: Rivals: 247Sports: On3: ESPN: (79)				
Trajen Greco; S	Hoschton, Georgia	Mill Creek High School	6 ft 1 in (1.85 m)	180 lb (82 kg)	Jan 6, 2024
Trajen Greco; S	Recruit ratings: Rivals: 247Sports: On3: ESPN: (82)				
Jaylen Brown; EDGE	Madison, Alabama	James Clemens High School	6 ft 6 in (1.98 m)	255 lb (116 kg)	Aug 22, 2023
Jaylen Brown; EDGE	Recruit ratings: Rivals: 247Sports: On3: ESPN: (80)				
Jayven Richardson; OT	Baton Rouge, Louisiana	East Ascension High School	6 ft 6 in (1.98 m)	315 lb (143 kg)	Nov 23, 2023
Jayven Richardson; OT	Recruit ratings: Rivals: 247Sports: On3: ESPN: (78)				
Nicholas Rodriguez; LB	Fort Lauderdale, Florida	St. Thomas Aquinas High School	6 ft 0 in (1.83 m)	195 lb (88 kg)	Jul 3, 2023
Nicholas Rodriguez; LB	Recruit ratings: Rivals: 247Sports: On3: ESPN: (80)				
Cameron Keys; CB	Panama City, Florida	A. Crawford Mosley High School	5 ft 10 in (1.78 m)	160 lb (73 kg)	Jul 4, 2023
Cameron Keys; CB	Recruit ratings: Rivals: 247Sports: On3: ESPN: (80)				
Aidan Glover; QB	Collierville, Tennessee	Collierville High School	6 ft 3 in (1.91 m)	190 lb (86 kg)	Jun 15, 2023
Aidan Glover; QB	Recruit ratings: Rivals: 247Sports: On3: ESPN: (76)				
Talan Chandler; OL	Nevada, Missouri	Nevada High School	6 ft 3 in (1.91 m)	290 lb (130 kg)	Nov 19, 2023
Talan Chandler; OL	Recruit ratings: Rivals: 247Sports: On3: ESPN: (79)				
Caleb Pyfrom; OL	Omaha, Nebraska	Omaha Central High School	6 ft 4 in (1.93 m)	310 lb (140 kg)	Dec 18, 2023
Caleb Pyfrom; OL	Recruit ratings: Rivals: 247Sports: On3: ESPN: (79)				
Jaren Sensabaugh; CB	Nashville, Tennessee	Ensworth High School	6 ft 0 in (1.83 m)	170 lb (77 kg)	Dec 19, 2023
Jaren Sensabaugh; CB	Recruit ratings: Rivals: 247Sports: On3: ESPN: (76)				
Austyn Dendy; ATH	Pine Bluff, Arkansas	Pine Bluff High School	6 ft 1 in (1.85 m)	195 lb (88 kg)	Sep 30, 2023
Austyn Dendy; ATH	Recruit ratings: Rivals: 247Sports: On3: ESPN: (77)				
Ryan Jostes; OT	Washington, Missouri	Washington High School	6 ft 6 in (1.98 m)	285 lb (129 kg)	Mar 11, 2023
Ryan Jostes; OT	Recruit ratings: Rivals: 247Sports: On3: ESPN: (77)				
Whit Hafer; TE	Joplin, Missouri	Joplin High School	6 ft 7 in (2.01 m)	230 lb (100 kg)	Feb 25, 2023
Whit Hafer; TE	Recruit ratings: Rivals: 247Sports: On3: ESPN: (77)				
Jude James; ATH	St. Charles, Missouri	Francis Howell High School	6 ft 4 in (1.93 m)	200 lb (91 kg)	Jun 30, 2023
Jude James; ATH	Recruit ratings: Rivals: 247Sports: On3: ESPN: (76)				
Jackson Hancock; S	Canton, Georgia	Sequoyah High School	6 ft 1 in (1.85 m)	180 lb (82 kg)	Jun 30, 2023
Jackson Hancock; S	Recruit ratings: Rivals: 247Sports: On3: ESPN: (76)				
Justin Bodford; DL	Fort Lauderdale, Florida	St. Thomas Aquinas High School	6 ft 1 in (1.85 m)	300 lb (140 kg)	Jul 2, 2023
Justin Bodford; DL	Recruit ratings: Rivals: 247Sports: On3: ESPN: (75)				
Overall recruit ranking: Rivals: 23 247Sports: 24 On3: 24 ESPN: 24
Note: In many cases, Scout, Rivals, 247Sports, On3, and ESPN may conflict in their listings of height and weight.; In these cases, the average was taken. ESPN grades are on a 100-point scale.; Sources: "Rivals commits". Rivals.; "2024 Team Ranking". Rivals.com.; "247Sports commits". 247Sports.

== Schedule ==
Date	Time	Opponent	Rank	Site	TV	Result	Attendance
August 29	7:00 p.m.	Murray State*	No. 11	Faurot Field; Columbia, MO	SECN	W 51–0	62,621
September 7	6:00 p.m.	Buffalo*	No. 9	Faurot Field; Columbia, MO	SECN+/ESPN+	W 38–0	62,621
September 14	11:45 a.m.	No. 24 Boston College*	No. 6	Faurot Field; Columbia, MO	SECN	W 27–21	62,621
September 21	3:15 p.m.	Vanderbilt	No. 7	Faurot Field; Columbia, MO	SECN	W 30–27 ^{2OT}	62,621
October 5	11:00 a.m.	at No. 25 Texas A&M	No. 9	Kyle Field; College Station, TX (SEC Nation)	ABC	L 10–41	97,049
October 12	11:00 a.m.	at UMass*	No. 21	Warren McGuirk Alumni Stadium; Hadley, MA	ESPN2	W 45–3	16,102
October 19	11:00 a.m.	Auburn^{†}	No. 19	Faurot Field; Columbia, MO	ESPN	W 21–17	62,621
October 26	2:30 p.m.	at No. 15 Alabama	No. 21	Bryant–Denny Stadium; Tuscaloosa, AL (SEC Nation)	ABC	L 0–34	100,077
November 9	6:45 p.m.	Oklahoma	No. 24	Faurot Field; Columbia, MO (Tiger-Sooner Peace Pipe)	SECN	W 30–23	62,621
November 16	3:15 p.m.	at No. 21 South Carolina	No. 23	Williams–Brice Stadium; Columbia, SC (Mayor's Cup)	SECN	L 30–34	79,361
November 23	3:15 p.m.	at Mississippi State	No. 23	Davis Wade Stadium; Starkville, MS	SECN	W 39–20	47,824
November 30	2:30 p.m.	Arkansas	No. 21	Faurot Field; Columbia, MO (Battle Line Rivalry)	SECN	W 28–21	62,621
December 30	1:30 p.m.	vs. Iowa*	No. 19	Nissan Stadium; Nashville, TN (Music City Bowl)	ESPN	W 27–24	43,375
*Non-conference game; ^{†}Homecoming; Rankings from AP Poll (and CFP Rankings, after November 5) – Released prior to game; All times are in Central time; Source:

== Personnel ==
2024 Missouri Tigers football team roster
Players
Coaches
Offense

Pos.	#	Name	Class
WR	0	Joshua Manning	So
WR	1	Theo Wease Jr.	GS
WR	2	Marquis Johnson	So
WR	3	Luther Burden III	Jr
WR	4	James Madison II	Fr
WR	5	Mookie Cooper	GS
QB	6	Drew Pyne	GS
WR	7	Courtney Crutchfield	Fr
RB	8	Nate Noel	GS
RB	9	Marcus Carroll	Sr
WR	10	Mekhi Miller	Jr
RB	11	Kewan Lacy	Fr
QB	12	Brady Cook	GS
QB	13	Aidan Glover	Fr
QB	14	Brett Brown	So
QB	15	Tommy Lock	Sr
WR	16	Daniel Blood	So
QB	17	J. R. Blood	GS
RB	18	Austyn Dendy	Fr
RB	20	Jamal Roberts	Fr
QB	21	Sam Horn	So
RB	22	Tavorus Jones	So
TE	28	Adam Molitor	Fr
RB	31	Anthony Favrow	Jr
RB	33	Bryce Jackson	Sr
WR	40	Derek Brandt	So
WR	41	Jaden Abongo Jr.	So
WR	43	Jayden Bolton	Jr
WR	45	Colton Westbrook	Sr
OL	50	Talan Chandler	Fr
OL	52	Marcus Bryant	Sr
OL	55	Connor Tollison	Jr
OL	61	Graham Gilmer	Fr
OL	63	Chace Missouri	So
OL	65	Henry McDermott	Jr
OL	66	Logan Reichert	Fr
OL	67	Xavier Machado	Jr
OL	68	Jack McGarry	Jr
OL	69	Drake Heismeyer	Sr
OL	70	Cayden Green	So
OL	71	Ryan Jostes	Fr
OL	72	Caleb Pyfrom	Fr
OL	73	Tristan Wilson	So
OL	74	Cam'Ron Johnson	GS
OL	75	Mitchell Walters	GS
OL	76	Jayven Richardson	Jr
OL	77	Curtis Peagler	So
OL	78	Brandon Solis	Fr
OL	79	Armand Membou	Jr
TE	80	Tyler Stephens	GS
WR	81	Noah Flaskamp	So
TE	82	Logan Muckey	Jr
TE	85	Whit Hafer	Fr
TE	86	Jordon Harris	So
TE	87	Brett Norfleet	So
TE	88	Tucker Miller	Jr
TE	89	Jude James	Fr

Defense

Pos.	#	Name	Class
S	1	Marvin Burks Jr.	So
CB	2	Toriano Pride	Jr
S	3	Sidney Williams	GS
S	4	Tre'Vez Johnson	Sr
DT	5	Kristian Williams	GS
DE	6	Williams Nwaneri	Fr
DT	7	Chris McClellan	Jr
CB	8	Marcus Clarke	Sr
DE	9	Zion Young	Jr
DT	10	Sterling Webb	Jr
LB	11	Corey Flagg Jr.	GS
CB	12	Dreyden Norwood	Jr
S	13	Daylan Carnell	Jr
LB	14	Triston Newson	GS
DE	15	Johnny Walker Jr.	GS
LB	16	Brayshawn Littlejohn	Fr
LB	17	Brian Huff	Fr
LB	18	Jeremiah Beasley	Fr
DE	19	Darris Smith	Jr
LB	20	Nicholas Rodriguez	Fr
S	21	Trajen Greco	Fr
LB	22	Will Norris	GS
CB	24	Nicholas Deloach Jr.	Fr
CB	25	Ja'Marion Wayne	So
CB	26	Shamar McNeil	Fr
S	28	Joseph Charleston	GS
LB	29	Khalil Jacobs	Jr
CB	29	Cameron Keys	Fr
LB	30	Chuck Hicks	GS
S	31	Nasir Pogue	Jr
CB	32	Jaren Sensabaugh	Fr
DT	33	Marquis Gracial	So
S	34	Jackson Hancock	Fr
S	36	Caleb Flagg	Jr
S	39	Gerald Lacy Jr.	So
S	41	Ricardo Merriweather	So
DE	45	Joe Moore	GS
CB	46	Colby Williams	So
LB	48	Brady Hultman	So
LB	51	Tyson Ellison	So
DE	52	Jahkai Lang	Fr
LB	53	Tommy Reese	So
LB	54	Jack Meyer	Sr
DT	55	Justin Bodford	Fr
LB	58	Jackson Daily	Fr
DE	60	Aidan Dubbert	So
DE	90	Grayson Cutchlow	Fr
DT	91	Elias Williams	Fr
DT	93	Jaylen Brown	Fr
DT	94	Sam Williams	Fr
DT	95	Jalen Marshall	So
DT	97	Eddie Kelly Jr.	Jr
DT	99	Jadon Frick	Fr

Special teams

Pos.	#	Name	Class
K	19	Blake Craig	Fr
LS	49	Brett Le Blanc	So
LS	57	Jack Kautz	Jr
LS	59	Trey Flint	GS
K	92	Brady Boehm	Fr
P	93	Luke Bauer	GS
P	94	Will Safris	Fr
K	96	Nick Quadrini	Jr
P	97	Orion Phillips	So

Head coach

- Eliah Drinkwitz

Coordinators/assistant coaches

- Al Pogue – Assistant head coach/cornerbacks
- Kirby Moore – Offensive coordinator/quarterbacks
- Corey Batoon –Defensive coordinator
- D. J. Smith – Co-defensive coordinator/linebackers
- Erik Link – Special teams coordinator
- Curtis Luper – Running backs
- Al Davis – Defensive linemen
- Jacob Peeler – Wide receivers
- Brandon Jones – Offensive linemen
- Brian Early – Defensive linemen/edge rushers
- Derham Cato – Tight ends
- David Blackwell – Defensive tackles
- Jacob Yoro – Safeties
- Jack Abercrombie – Offensive assistant
- Andrew Belluomini – Offensive assistant
- Brendan Boylan – Offensive assistant
- Sean Gleeson – Offensive assistant
- Christopher Ball – Defensive assistant
- Brian Hamilton – Defensive assistant
- Brandon Lewis – Defensive assistant
- Brock Olivo – Special teams assistant
- Devin Coleman – Graduate assistant
- Bo Els – Graduate assistant
- Cooper Williams – Graduate assistant
- Keyan Williams – Graduate assistant

Legend

- (C) Team captain
- (S) Suspended
- (I) Ineligible
- Injured
- Redshirt

Roster
Last update: 11/27/24

== Rankings ==
Ranking movements Legend: ██ Increase in ranking ██ Decrease in ranking RV = Received votes т = Tied with team above or below
	Week																
Poll	Pre	1	2	3	4	5	6	7	8	9	10	11	12	13	14	15	Final
AP	11	9	6	7	11	9	21	19	21	25	RV	24	RV	24	22	23	22
Coaches	11	10	8	8т	11	9	18	16	17	23	22	21	RV	24	20	20	20
CFP	Not released										24	23	23	21	19	19	Not released

== Game summaries ==
=== vs. Murray State (FCS) ===
Uniform Combination
Helmet (Oval Tiger)	Jersey	Pants

Game One – Murray State Racers (FCS) (0–0) at No. 11 Missouri Tigers (0–0) – Game summary

Quarter	1	2	3	4	Total
Racers (FCS)	0	0	0	0	0
No. 11 Tigers	28	7	10	6	51

at Faurot Field • Columbia, Missouri

- Date: Thursday, August 29, 2024
- Game time: 7 pm CDT
- Game weather: Sunny, 85 °F (29 °C) S 7 mph (11 km/h)
- Game attendance: 62,621
- TV announcers (SECN): Matt Barrie (play-by-play), Dan Mullen (analyst), and Harry Lyles Jr. (sideline)

Game information

First quarter

- (12:42) MIZ: Luther Burden III 16 yard pass from Brady Cook (Blake Craig Kick) (Drive: 6 plays, 42 yards, 2:15; Missouri 7–0)
- (9:48) MIZ: Nate Noel 9 yard run (Blake Craig Kick) (Drive: 3 plays, 34 yards, 1:12; Missouri 14–0)
- (9:41) MIZ: Toriano Pride Jr. 25 yard interception return (Blake Craig Kick) (Drive: 1 plays, 0 yards, 0:08; Missouri 21–0)
- (3:38) MIZ: Marcus Carroll 1 yard run (Blake Craig Kick) (Drive: 6 plays, 70 yards, 2:03; Missouri 28–0)

Second quarter

- (0:01) MIZ: Brady Cook 3 yard run (Blake Craig Kick) (Drive: 14 plays, 68 yards, 3:02; Missouri 35–0)

Third quarter

- (8:50) MIZ: Blake Craig 39 yard field goal (Drive: 9 plays, 76 yards, 4:21; Missouri 38–0)
- (7:09) MIZ: Jamal Roberts 2 yard run (Blake Craig Kick) (Drive: 2 plays, 10 yards, 0:49; Missouri 45–0)

Fourth quarter

- (13:34) MIZ: Blake Craig 22 yard field goal (Drive: 14 plays, 76 yards, 7:06; Missouri 48–0)
- (1:57) MIZ: Blake Craig 27 yard field goal (Drive: 12 plays, 84 yards, 6:32; Missouri 51–0)

Statistics	MUR	MIZ
First downs	5	30
Total yards	86	489
Rushing yards	59	189
Passing yards	27	300
Passing: Comp–Att–Int	7–15–1	29–41–0
Time of possession	26:46	33:14

Team	Category	Player	Statistics
Murray State	Passing	Jayden Johannsen	7–13, 27 yards, 1 INT
Murray State	Rushing	Jawaun Northington	7 carries, 25 yards
Murray State	Receiving	Josh Crabtree	2 reception, 14 yards
Missouri	Passing	Brady Cook	19–30, 218 yards, 1 TD
Missouri	Rushing	Nate Noel	11 carries, 48 yards, 1 TD
Missouri	Receiving	Luther Burden III	4 receptions, 49 yards, 1 TD

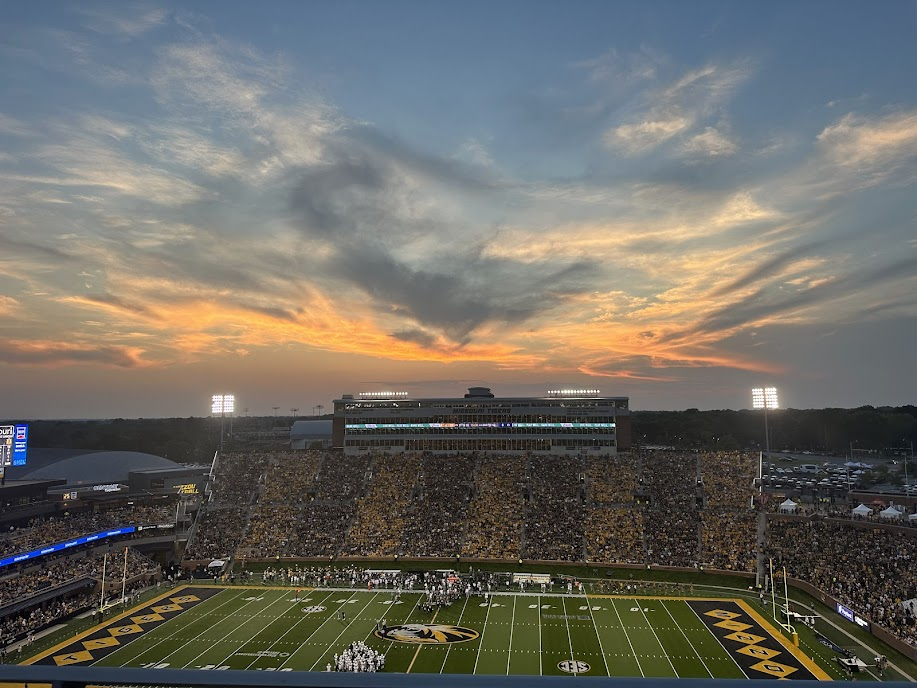
Sunset at Faurot as Missouri takes on Murray State

=== vs. Buffalo ===
Uniform Combination
Helmet (Oval Tiger)	Jersey	Pants

Game Two – Buffalo Bulls (1–0) at No. 9 Missouri Tigers (1–0) – Game summary

Quarter	1	2	3	4	Total
Bulls	0	0	0	0	0
No. 9 Tigers	3	21	7	7	38

at Faurot Field • Columbia, Missouri

- Date: Saturday, September 7, 2024
- Game time: 6 PM CDT
- Game weather: Sunny, 70 °F (21 °C) NE 9 mph (14 km/h)
- Game attendance: 62,621
- TV announcers (SECN+/ESPN+): Lowell Galindo (play-by-play) and Fozzy Whittaker (analyst)

Game information

First quarter

- (10:47) MIZ: Blake Craig 51 yard field goal (Drive: 7 plays, 26 yards, 3:21; Missouri 3–0)

Second quarter

- (12:13) MIZ: Luther Burden III 3 yard run (Blake Craig Kick) (Drive: 10 plays, 64 yards, 5:09; Missouri 10–0)
- (6:12) MIZ: Brady Cook 3 yard run (Blake Craig Kick) (Drive: 9 plays, 69 yards, 3:55; Missouri 17–0)
- (1:51) MIZ: Brady Cook 31 yard run (Blake Craig Kick) (Drive: 4 plays, 55 yards, 1:12; Missouri 24–0)

Third quarter

- (1:00) MIZ: Nate Noel 4 yard run (Blake Craig Kick) (Drive: 8 plays, 47 yards, 4:17; Missouri 31–0)

Fourth quarter

- (0:31) MIZ: Jamal Roberts yard run (Blake Craig Kick) (Drive: 10 plays, 53 yards, 3:08; Missouri 38–0)

Statistics	UB	MIZ
First downs	9	28
Total yards	169	518
Rushing yards	114	255
Passing yards	55	263
Passing: Comp–Att–Int	6–20–1	34–42–1
Time of possession	21:39	38:21

Team	Category	Player	Statistics
Buffalo	Passing	C. J. Ogbonna	6–20, 55 yards, 1 INT
Buffalo	Rushing	Jacqez Barksdale	15 carries, 67 yards
Buffalo	Receiving	Victor Snow	4 receptions, 41 yards
Missouri	Passing	Brady Cook	28–36, 228 yards, 1 INT
Missouri	Rushing	Nate Noel	12 carries, 73 yards, 1 TD
Missouri	Receiving	Theo Wease Jr.	13 receptions, 149 yards

=== vs. No. 24 Boston College ===
Uniform Combination
Helmet (Oval Tiger)	Jersey	Pants

Game Three – No. 24 Boston College Eagles (2–0) at No. 6 Missouri Tigers (2–0) – Game summary

Quarter	1	2	3	4	Total
No. 24 Eagles	7	7	0	7	21
No. 6 Tigers	3	14	7	3	27

at Faurot Field • Columbia, Missouri

- Date: Saturday, September 14, 2024
- Game time: 11:45 AM CDT
- Game weather: Mostly cloudy, 80 °F (27 °C) SE 7 mph (11 km/h)
- Game attendance: 62,621
- TV announcers (SECN): Taylor Zarzour (play-by-play), Matt Stinchcomb (analyst), and Alyssa Lang (sideline)

Game information

First quarter

- (7:31) BC: Jerand Bradley 12 yard pass from Thomas Castellanos (Luca Lombardo Kick). (Drive: 14 plays, 75 yards, 7:29; Boston College 7–0)
- (2:49) MIZ: Blake Craig 38 yard field goal (Drive: 11 plays, 60 yards, 4:37; Boston College 7–3)

Second quarter

- (9:44) BC: Reed Harris 67 yard pass from Thomas Castellanos (Luca Lombardo Kick). (Drive: 4 plays, 86 yards, 1:32; Boston College 14–3)
- (4:54) MIZ: Blake Craig 38 yard field goal (Drive: 10 plays, 67 yards, 4:50; Boston College 14–6)
- (3:04) MIZ: Luther Burden III 19 yard pass from Brady Cook (Nate Noel Run for Two Point Conversion) (Drive: 3 plays, 25 yards, 1:16; Tied 14–14)
- (0:00) MIZ: Blake Craig 56 yard field goal (Drive: 6 plays, 53 yards, 0:46; Missouri 17–14)

Third quarter

- (10:31) MIZ: Brady Cook 6 yard run (Blake Craig Kick) (Drive: 9 plays, 75 yards, 4:29; Missouri 24–14)

Fourth quarter

- (5:58) MIZ: Blake Craig 31 yard field goal (Drive: 14 plays, 48 yards, 7:24; Missouri 27–14)
- (3:45) BC: Kamari Morales 38 yard pass from Thomas Castellanos (Luca Lombardo Kick). (Drive: 8 plays, 75 yards, 2:13; Missouri 27–21)

Statistics	BC	MIZ
First downs	16	22
Total yards	298	440
Rushing yards	49	176
Passing yards	249	264
Passing: Comp–Att–Int	16–28–2	21–30–0
Time of possession	24:14	35:46

Team	Category	Player	Statistics
Boston College	Passing	Thomas Castellanos	16–28, 249 yards, 3 TD, 2 INT
Boston College	Rushing	Treshaun Ward	6 carries, 21 yards
Boston College	Receiving	Reed Harris	1 reception, 67 yards, 1 TD
Missouri	Passing	Brady Cook	21–30, 264 yards, 1 TD
Missouri	Rushing	Nate Noel	22 carries, 121 yards
Missouri	Receiving	Luther Burden III	6 receptions, 117 yards, 1 TD

=== vs. Vanderbilt ===
Uniform Combination
Helmet (Oval Tiger)	Jersey	Pants

Game Four – Vanderbilt Commodores (2–1) at No. 7 Missouri Tigers (3–0) – Game summary

Quarter	1	2	3	4	OT	2OT	Total
Commodores	7	6	7	0	7	0	27
No. 7 Tigers	7	3	10	0	7	3	30

at Faurot Field • Columbia, Missouri

- Date: Saturday, September 21, 2024
- Game time: 3:15 pm CDT
- Game weather: Mostly cloudy, 75 °F (24 °C) SE 8 mph (13 km/h)
- Game attendance: 62,621
- TV announcers (SECN): Taylor Zarzour (play-by-play), Matt Stinchcomb (analyst), and Alyssa Lang (sideline)

Game information

First quarter

- (9:06) VAN: Joseph McVay 65 yard pass from Diego Pavia (Brock Taylor Kick). (Drive: 4 plays, 92 yards, 1:55; Vanderbilt 7–0)
- (3:51) MIZ: Luther Burden III 20 yard pass from Brady Cook (Blake Craig Kick) (Drive: 10 plays, 76 yards, 5:06; Tied 7–7)

Second quarter

- (13:27) VAN: Brock Taylor 27 yard field goal. (Drive: 10 plays, 66 yards, 5:24; Vanderbilt 10–7)
- (1:17) MIZ: Blake Craig 23 yard field goal. (Drive: 9 plays, 47 yards, 3:06; Tied 10–10)
- (0:00) VAN: Brock Taylor 57 yard field goal. (Drive: 2 plays, 4 yards, 0:08; Vanderbilt 13–10)

Third quarter

- (10:58) MIZ: Blake Craig 54 yard field goal. (Drive: 9 plays, 21 yards, 3:56; Tied 13–13)
- (8:18) MIZ: Marcus Carroll 3 yard run (Blake Craig Kick). (Drive: 4 plays, 75 yards, 1:03; Missouri 20–13)
- (0:21) VAN: AJ Newberry 4 yard run (Brock Taylor Kick). (Drive: 8 plays, 80 yards, 5:08; Tied 20–20)

Fourth quarter

- No scoring

First Overtime

- VAN: Gabe Fisher 2 yard pass from Diego Pavia (Brock Taylor Kick). (Drive: 4 plays, 25 yards; Vanderbilt 27–20)
- MIZ: Luther Burden III 25 yard pass from Brady Cook (Blake Craig Kick) (Drive: 1 play, 25 yards; Tied 27–27)

Second Overtime

- MIZ: Blake Craig 37 yard field goal. (Missouri 30–27)

Statistics	VAN	MIZ
First downs	15	22
Total yards	324	442
Rushing yards	146	216
Passing yards	178	226
Passing: Comp–Att–Int	14–23–0	23–37–0
Time of possession	26:54	33:06

Team	Category	Player	Statistics
Vanderbilt	Passing	Diego Pavia	14–23, 178 yards, 2 TD
Vanderbilt	Rushing	Diego Pavia	17 carries, 84 yards
Vanderbilt	Receiving	Joseph McVay	1 reception, 65 yards, TD
Missouri	Passing	Brady Cook	23–37, 226 yards, 2 TD
Missouri	Rushing	Nate Noel	24 carries, 199 yards
Missouri	Receiving	Luther Burden III	6 reception, 76 yards, 2 TD

=== at No. 25 Texas A&M ===
Uniform Combination
Helmet (Oval Tiger)	Jersey	Pants

Game Five – No. 9 Missouri Tigers (4–0) at No. 25 Texas A&M Aggies (4–1) – Game summary

Quarter	1	2	3	4	Total
No. 9 Tigers	0	0	7	3	10
No. 25 Aggies	10	14	10	7	41

at Kyle Field • College Station, Texas

- Date: Saturday, October 5, 2024
- Game time: 11:00 AM CDT
- Game weather: Sunny, 80 °F (27 °C), NE 7 mph (11 km/h)
- Game attendance: 97,049
- Referee: Jeff Heaser
- TV announcers (ABC): Joe Tessitore (play-by-play), Jordan Rodgers (analyst), and Stormy Buonantony (sideline)

Game information

First quarter

- (9:17) TAMU: Amari Daniels 1 yard run (Randy Bond Kick). Texas A&M 7–0
- (5:01) TAMU: Randy Bond 44 yard field goal. Texas A&M 10–0

Second quarter

- (14:27) TAMU: Amari Daniels 1 yard run (Randy Bond Kick). Texas A&M 17–0
- (6:34) TAMU: Le'Veon Moss 1 yard run (Randy Bond Kick). Texas A&M 24–0

Third quarter

- (14:47) TAMU: Le'Veon Moss 75 yard run (Randy Bond Kick). Texas A&M 31–0
- (6:30) TAMU: Randy Bond 38 yard field goal. Texas A&M 34–0
- (5:06) MIZ: Theo Wease Jr. 59 yard pass from Brady Cook (Blake Craig Kick). Texas A&M 34–7

Fourth quarter

- (11:00) TAMU: Le'Veon Moss 18 yard run (Randy Bond Kick). Texas A&M 41–7
- (0:08) MIZ: Blake Craig 23 yard field goal. Texas A&M 41–10

Statistics	MIZ	TAMU
First downs	13	20
Total yards	254	512
Rushing yards	68	236
Passing yards	186	276
Passing: Comp–Att–Int	13–31–0	18–22–0
Time of possession	26:47	33:13

Team	Category	Player	Statistics
Missouri	Passing	Brady Cook	13–31, 186 yards, 1 TD
Missouri	Rushing	Nate Noel	10 carries, 30 yards
Missouri	Receiving	Luther Burden III	7 receptions, 82 yards
Texas A&M	Passing	Conner Weigman	18–22, 276 yards
Texas A&M	Rushing	Le'Veon Moss	12 carries, 138 yards, 3 TD
Texas A&M	Receiving	Terry Bussey	3 receptions, 76 yards

=== at UMass ===
Uniform Combination
Helmet (Block M)	Jersey	Pants

Game Six – No. 21 Missouri Tigers (4–1) at UMass Minutemen (1–5) – Game summary

Quarter	1	2	3	4	Total
No. 21 Tigers	14	10	21	0	45
Minutemen	0	3	0	0	3

at McGuirk Alumni Stadium • Amherst, Massachusetts

- Date: Saturday, October 12, 2024
- Game time: 11:00 AM CDT
- Game weather: Sunny • Temperature: 64 °F (18 °C) • Wind: NW at 14 miles per hour (23 km/h)
- Game attendance: 16,102
- Referee: Gary Patterson
- TV announcers (ESPN2): Roy Philpott (play-by-play), Sam Acho (analyst), and Taylor Davis (sideline)

Game information

First quarter

- (14:03) MIZ – Luther Burden 61-yard run, Blake Craig kick (Drive: 2 plays, 63 yards, 0:51; Missouri 7–0)
- (5:15) MIZ – Marcus Carroll 3-yard run, Blake Craig kick (Drive: 13 plays, 80 yards, 7:10; Missouri 14–0)

Second quarter

- (11:02) MIZ – Marcus Carroll 4-yard run, Blake Craig kick (Drive: 9 plays, 80 yards, 4:37; Missouri 21–0)
- (6:00) UMA – Jacob Lurie 28-yard field goal (Drive: 10 plays, 65 yards, 5:02; Missouri 21–3)
- (0:00) MIZ – Blake Craig 42-yard field goal (Drive: 2 plays, −10 yards, 0:08; Missouri 24–3)

Third quarter

- (10:09) MIZ – Marcus Carroll 35-yard run, Blake Craig kick (Drive: 6 plays, 57 yards, 2:28; Missouri 31–3)
- (8:30) MIZ – Joshua Manning 63-yard pass from Brady Cook, Blake Craig kick (Drive: 1 play, 63 yards, 0:12; Missouri 38–3)
- (1:24) MIZ – Brett Norfleet 8-yard pass from Brady Cook, Blake Craig kick (Drive: 3 plays, 48 yards, 1:41; Missouri 45–3)

Fourth quarter

No scoring plays

Statistics	MIZ	MASS
First downs	22	13
Total yards	461	237
Rushing yards	231	95
Passing yards	230	142
Passing: Comp–Att–Int	17–24–0	15–25–1
Time of possession	31:41	28:19

Team	Category	Player	Statistics
Missouri	Passing	Brady Cook	14/19, 219 yards, 2 TD
Missouri	Rushing	Marcus Carroll	15 carries, 91 yards, 3 TD
Missouri	Receiving	Joshua Manning	2 receptions, 68 yards, TD
UMass	Passing	Taisun Phommachanh	12/22, 132 yards, INT
UMass	Rushing	Te'Rai Powell	1 carry, 39 yards
UMass	Receiving	Jakobie Keeney-James	6 receptions, 80 yards

=== vs. Auburn (Homecoming) ===
Uniform Combination
Helmet (Block M)	Jersey	Pants

Game Seven – Auburn Tigers (2–4) at No. 19 Missouri Tigers (5–1) – Game summary

Quarter	1	2	3	4	Total
Auburn	0	3	14	0	17
No. 19 Missouri	3	0	3	15	21

at Faurot Field • Columbia, Missouri

- Date: Saturday, October 19, 2024
- Game time: 11:00 a.m. CDT
- Game weather: Sunny • Temperature: 62 °F (17 °C) • Wind: S 6 miles per hour (9.7 km/h)
- Game attendance: 62,621
- Referee: David Smith
- TV announcers (ESPN): Dave Pasch (play-by-play), Dusty Dvoracek (analyst), and Taylor McGregor (sideline)
- Notes: Brady Cook suffered a high ankle sprain on the first offensive series of the game. He was transferred to MU Hospital for an MRI, and would return to the game late in the 3rd quarter with Mizzou losing 17–6. He then led two touchdown drives to win the game.

Game information

First quarter

- (8:24) MIZ – Blake Craig 51 yard field goal (Drive: 12 plays, 41 yards, 6:36; Missouri 3–0)

Second quarter

- (11:12) AUB – Towns McGough 32 yard field goal (Drive: 11 plays, 64 yards, 5:45; Tied 3–3)

Third quarter

- (12:34) AUB – Cam Coleman 47 yard pass from Payton Thorne (Towns McGough Kick) (Drive: 6 plays, 75 yards, 2:26; Auburn 10–3)
- (11:08) AUB – Antonio Kite 0 yard fumble return (Towns McGough Kick) (Auburn 17–3)
- (7:44) MIZ – Blake Craig 38 yard field goal (Drive: 9 plays, 44 yards, 3:24; Auburn 17–6)

Fourth quarter

- (14:57) MIZ – Marcus Carroll 2 yard run (Brady Cook run for 2 point conversion) (Drive: 4 plays, 80 yards, 0:34; Auburn 17–14)
- (0:46) MIZ – Jamal Roberts 4 yard run (Blake Craig Kick) (Drive: 17 plays, 95 yards, 3:40; Missouri 21–17)

Statistics	AUB	MIZ
First downs	17	20
Total yards	286	354
Rushing yards	110	82
Passing yards	176	272
Passing: Comp–Att–Int	17–29–0	21–43–0
Time of possession	32:27	27:33

Team	Category	Player	Statistics
Auburn	Passing	Payton Thorne	17/29, 176 yards, 1 TD
Auburn	Rushing	Jarquez Hunter	19 carries, 57 yards
Auburn	Receiving	Cam Coleman	1 reception, 47 yards, 1 TD
Missouri	Passing	Brady Cook	11/22, 194 yards
Missouri	Rushing	Marcus Carroll	8 carries, 40 yards, 1 TD
Missouri	Receiving	Mookie Cooper	2 receptions, 84 yards

=== at No. 15 Alabama ===
Uniform Combination
Helmet (Block M)	Jersey	Pants

Game Eight – No. 21 Missouri Tigers (6–1) at No. 15 Alabama Crimson Tide (5–2) – Game summary

Quarter	1	2	3	4	Total
No. 21 Tigers	0	0	0	0	0
No. 15 Crimson Tide	3	10	14	7	34

at Bryant-Denny Stadium • Tuscaloosa, Alabama

- Date: Saturday, October 26, 2024
- Game time: 2:30 p.m. CDT
- Game weather: Sunny, 85 °F (29 °C), E 5 mph (8.0 km/h)
- Game attendance: 100,077
- Referee: Jeff Heaser
- TV announcers (ABC): Joe Tessitore (play-by-play), Jordan Rodgers (analyst), and Katie George (sideline)
- Notes: Brady Cook would start the game at QB despite suffering a high ankle sprain in the Auburn game. However, Cook would leave the game in the 2nd quarter after injuring his throwing hand, and did not return to the game (it would be revealed later that Cook broke the wrist in his throwing hand). Drew Pyne would take the majority of the snaps at QB for the remainder of the game, with JR Blood getting a few snaps, as well. Mizzou's leading rusher, Nate Noel, was also unavailable for the game due to a foot injury suffered in the Auburn game.

Game information

First quarter

- (8:50) ALA – Graham Nicholson 47-yard field goal (Drive: 8 plays, 50 yards, 4:03; Alabama 3–0)

Second quarter

- (4:38) ALA – Graham Nicholson 39-yard field goal (Drive: 11 plays, 59 yards, 4:08; Alabama 6–0)
- (1:54) ALA – Jam Miller 3-yard run (Graham Nicholson kick) (Drive: 3 plays, 35 yards, 0:43; Alabama 13–0)

Third quarter

- (12:33) ALA – Jalen Milroe 9-yard run (Graham Nicholson kick) (Drive: 6 plays, 80 yards, 2:27; Alabama 20–0)
- (4:28) ALA – Jam Miller 11-yard run (Graham Nicholson kick) (Drive: 5 plays, 65 yards, 2:29; Alabama 27–0)

Fourth quarter

- (11:06) ALA – Justice Haynes 35-yard run (Graham Nicholson kick) (Drive: 5 plays, 77 yards, 2:34; Alabama 34–0)

Statistics	MIZ	ALA
First downs	15	22
Total yards	239	486
Rushing yards	167	271
Passing yards	72	215
Passing: Comp–Att–Int	13–24–3	16–26–0
Time of possession	30:01	29:59

Team	Category	Player	Statistics
Missouri	Passing	Drew Pyne	6/12, 42 yards, 3 INT
Missouri	Rushing	Marcus Carroll	17 carries, 80 yards
Missouri	Receiving	Brett Norfleet	3 receptions, 23 yards
Alabama	Passing	Jalen Milroe	16/26, 215 yards
Alabama	Rushing	Justice Haynes	8 carries, 79 yards, 1 TD
Alabama	Receiving	Germie Bernard	5 receptions, 82 yards

=== vs. Oklahoma (rivalry) ===
Uniform Combination
Helmet (Block M)	Jersey	Pants

Game Nine – Oklahoma Sooners (5–4) at No. 24 Missouri Tigers (6–2) – Game summary

Quarter	1	2	3	4	Total
Oklahoma	0	9	0	14	23
No. 24 Missouri	0	3	7	20	30

at Faurot Field • Columbia, Missouri

- Date: Saturday, November 9, 2024
- Game time: 6:45 p.m. CST
- Game weather: Sunny, 55 °F (13 °C)
- Game attendance: 62,621
- Referee: Daniel Gautreaux
- TV announcers (SECN): Tom Hart (play-by-play), Jordan Rodgers (analyst), and Cole Cubelic (sideline)
- Notes: Drew Pyne started the game at QB for Missouri as Brady Cook was out with a broken wrist. Oklahoma would take a touchdown lead with 2 minutes remaining in the 4th quarter after a 43 yard fumble recovery touchdown. However, Missouri would tie the game with a 75 yard touchdown drive in only 57 seconds. The Tigers then took the lead for good with a fumble recovery touchdown of their own with 22 seconds left. The Sooners fumbled the ball 6 times in the game, losing 4 of them. This was the first meeting of Missouri and Oklahoma in Columbia since October 23rd, 2010, in which the Tigers upset the #1 ranked Sooners on Homecoming.

Game information

First quarter

- No scoring

Second quarter

- (14:57) OU – Zach Schmit 40 yard field goal (Drive: 13 plays, 58 yards, 5:53; Oklahoma 3–0)
- (7:58) OU – Zach Schmit 35 yard field goal (Drive: 6 plays, 27 yards, 2:49; Oklahoma 6–0)
- (3:26) MIZ – Blake Craig 25 yard field goal (Drive: 5 plays, 20 yards, 2:22; Oklahoma 6–3)
- (0:00) OU – Zach Schmit 56 yard field goal (Drive: 3 plays, 13 yards, 0:10; Oklahoma 9–3)

Third quarter

- (5:43) MIZ – Theo Wease Jr. 13 yard pass from Drew Pyne (Blake Craig kick) (Drive: 12 plays, 59 yards, 6:34; Missouri 10–9)

Fourth quarter

- (8:47) MIZ – Brett Norfleet 5 yard pass from Drew Pyne (Blake Craig PAT failed) (Drive: 9 plays, 30 yards, 4:56; Missouri 16–9)
- (3:18) OU – Jackson Arnold 18 yard pass from Taylor Tatum (Zach Schmit kick) (Drive: 12 plays, 75 yards, 5:29; Tied 16–16)
- (2:00) OU – Billy Bowman Jr. 43 yard fumble return (Zach Schmit kick) (Oklahoma 23–16)
- (1:03) MIZ – Theo Wease Jr. 10 yard pass from Drew Pyne (Blake Craig kick) (Drive: 8 plays, 75 yards, 0:57; Tied 23–23)
- (0:22) MIZ – Zion Young 17 yard fumble return (Blake Craig kick) (Missouri 30–23)

Statistics	OU	MIZ
First downs	15	19
Total yards	257	278
Rushing yards	122	135
Passing yards	135	143
Passing: Comp–Att–Int	17–26–0	14–27–0
Time of possession	25:34	34:26

Team	Category	Player	Statistics
Oklahoma	Passing	Jackson Arnold	15/24, 74 yards
Oklahoma	Rushing	Xavier Robinson	9 carries, 56 yards
Oklahoma	Receiving	Deion Burks	5 receptions, 44 yards
Missouri	Passing	Drew Pyne	14/27, 143 yards, 3 TD
Missouri	Rushing	Jamal Roberts	13 carries, 54 yards
Missouri	Receiving	Theo Wease Jr.	4 receptions, 70 yards, 2 TD

=== at No. 21 South Carolina ===
Uniform Combination
Helmet (Script "Missouri")	Jersey	Pants

Game Ten – No. 23 Missouri Tigers (7–2) at No. 21 South Carolina Gamecocks (6–3) – Game summary

Quarter	1	2	3	4	Total
No. 23 Tigers	6	0	6	18	30
No. 21 Gamecocks	7	14	0	13	34

at Williams-Brice Stadium • Columbia, South Carolina

- Date: Saturday, November 16, 2024
- Game time: 3:15 p.m. CST
- Game weather: Sunny, 66 °F (19 °C), NW 4 mph (6.4 km/h)
- Game attendance: 79,361
- Referee: Lee Hedrick
- TV announcers (SECN): Tom Hart (play-by-play), Jordan Rodgers (analyst), and Cole Cubelic (sideline)
- Notes: Missouri took a 3 point lead with 1:10 left in regulation after a one-handed touchdown catch by Luther Burden on 4th and 5 from the South Carolina 37 yard line. However, South Carolina would score a touchdown of their own to retake the lead and win the game with 15 seconds remaining. This was the Gamecocks' first win over the Tigers since the 2018 season. This loss officially eliminated the Tigers from playoff contention.

Game information

First quarter

- (10:00) MIZ: Blake Craig 38 yard Field Goal. 3-0 Missouri
- (7:27) SCAR: Nyck Harbor 26 yard pass from LaNorris Sellers (Alex Herrera Kick). 7-3 South Carolina
- (2:41) MIZ: Blake Craig 37 yard Field Goal. 7-6 South Carolina

Second quarter

- (1:57) SCAR: Joshua Simon 6 yard pass from LaNorris Sellers (Alex Herrera Kick). 14-6 South Carolina
- (0:39) SCAR: Jared Brown 38 yard pass from LaNorris Sellers (Alex Herrera Kick). 21-6 South Carolina

Third quarter

- (4:54) MIZ: Marcus Carroll 2 yard run (Two-point Run Conversion Failed). 21-12 South Carolina

Fourth quarter

- (12:49) MIZ: Blake Craig 25 yard Field Goal. 21-15 South Carolina
- (9:12) MIZ: Nate Noel 1 yard run (Blake Craig Kick). 22-21 Missouri
- (5:04) SCAR: Michael Smith 5 yard pass from LaNorris Sellers (Two-Point Pass Conversion Failed). 27-22 South Carolina
- (1:10) MIZ: Luther Burden III 37 yard pass from Brady Cook (Jamal Roberts Run for Two-Point Conversion). 30-27 Missouri
- (0:15) SCAR: Raheim Sanders 15 yard pass from LaNorris Sellers (Alex Herrera Kick). 34-30 South Carolina

Statistics	MIZ	SCAR
First downs	20	22
Total yards	381	462
Rushing yards	144	109
Passing yards	237	353
Passing: Comp–Att–Int	21–31–1	21–30–1
Time of possession	31:44	28:16

Team	Category	Player	Statistics
Missouri	Passing	Brady Cook	21/31, 237 yards, 1 TD, 1 INT
Missouri	Rushing	Nate Noel	27 carries, 150 yards, 1 TD
Missouri	Receiving	Theo Wease Jr.	6 receptions, 85 yards
South Carolina	Passing	LaNorris Sellers	21/30, 353 yards, 5 TD, 1 INT
South Carolina	Rushing	Raheim Sanders	19 carries, 53 yards
South Carolina	Receiving	Dalevon Campbell	2 receptions, 86 yards

=== at Mississippi State ===
Uniform Combination
Helmet (Oval Tiger)	Jersey	Pants

Game Eleven – No. 23 Missouri Tigers (7–3) at Mississippi State Bulldogs (2–8) – Game summary

Quarter	1	2	3	4	Total
No. 23 Tigers	14	14	3	8	39
Bulldogs	10	3	7	0	20

at Davis Wade Stadium • Starkville, Mississippi

- Date: Saturday, November 23, 2024
- Game time: 3:15 p.m. CST
- Game weather: Sunny • Temperature: 59 °F (15 °C) • Wind: N 2 miles per hour (3.2 km/h)
- Game attendance: 47,824
- Referee: David Smith
- TV announcers (SECN): Taylor Zarzour (play-by-play), Matt Stinchcomb (analyst), and Alyssa Lang (sideline)

Game information

First quarter

- (11:42) MSU: Kyle Ferrie 38 yard Field Goal. 3-0 Mississippi State
- (6:33) MIZ: Daylan Carnell 68 yard Fumble Return (Blake Craig Kick). 7-3 Missouri
- (2:49) MIZ: Marcus Carroll 2 yard run (Blake Craig Kick). 14-3 Missouri
- (0:20) MSU: Jordan Mosley 11 yard pass from Michael Van Buren Jr. (Kyle Ferrie Kick). 14-10 Missouri

Second quarter

- (9:58) MIZ: Luther Burden III 28 yard pass from Brady Cook (Blake Craig Kick). 21-10 Missouri
- (4:32) MIZ: Marcus Carroll 19 yard run (Blake Craig Kick). 28-10 Missouri
- (0:30) MSU: Kyle Ferrie 26 yard Field Goal. 28-13 Missouri

Third quarter

- (6:14) MIZ: Blake Craig 35 yard Field Goal. 31-13 Missouri
- (5:31) MSU: Davon Booth 43 yard run (Kyle Ferrie Kick). 31-20 Missouri

Fourth quarter

- (5:40) MIZ: Marcus Carroll 1 yard run (Marcus Carroll run for two-point conversion). 39-20 Missouri

Statistics	MIZ	MSST
First downs	24	16
Total yards	472	338
Rushing yards	204	147
Passing yards	268	191
Passing: Comp–Att–Int	15–20–0	16–28–0
Time of possession	41:51	18:09

Team	Category	Player	Statistics
Missouri	Passing	Brady Cook	15/20, 268 yards, TD
Missouri	Rushing	Nate Noel	25 carries, 95 yards
Missouri	Receiving	Luther Burden III	7 receptions, 91 yards, TD
Mississippi State	Passing	Michael Van Buren Jr.	16/28, 191 yards, TD
Mississippi State	Rushing	Davon Booth	12 carries, 124 yards, TD
Mississippi State	Receiving	Kelly Akharaiyi	3 receptions, 64 yards

=== vs. Arkansas (Battle Line Rivalry) ===
Uniform Combination
Helmet (Block M)	Jersey	Pants

Game Twelve – Arkansas Razorbacks (6–5) at No. 21 Missouri Tigers (8–3) – Game summary

Quarter	1	2	3	4	Total
Razorbacks	0	7	7	7	21
No. 21 Tigers	7	0	3	18	28

at Faurot Field • Columbia, Missouri

- Date: Saturday, November 30, 2024
- Game time: 2:30 p.m. CST
- Game weather: Light snow, 27 degrees, 5 mph NE winds
- Game attendance: 62,621 (paid attendance, gate attendance was much less)
- Referee: Ken Williamson
- TV announcers (SECN): Taylor Zarzour (play-by-play), Matt Stinchcomb (analyst), and Alyssa Lang (sideline)
- Notes: 3" of snow fell on Faurot Field before gametime, with the field remaining partially snow covered for the entirety of the game. Brady Cook scored on a 30 yard run with 1:53 to go in the 4th quarter in his last game at Faurot Field. Missouri's defense would hold, as Taylen Green's Hail Mary to the end zone fell incomplete as time expired. Missouri finished the regular season 9–3 overall and 5–3 in the SEC.

Game information

First quarter

- (2:23) MIZ: Marcus Carroll 2 yard run (Blake Craig Kick). 7-0 Missouri

Second quarter

- (9:42) ARK: Ja'Quinden Jackson 2 yard run (Matthew Shipley Kick). Tied 7-7

Third quarter

- (11:41) ARK: Ja'Quinden Jackson 12 yard run (Matthew Shipley Kick). 14-7 Arkansas
- (3:06) MIZ: Blake Craig 28 yard field goal. 14-10 Arkansas

Fourth quarter

- (13:45) MIZ: Marcus Carroll 1 yard run (Blake Craig Kick). 17-14 Missouri
- (9:39) MIZ: Blake Craig 34 yard field goal. 20-14 Missouri
- (4:19) ARK: Ja'Quinden Jackson 9 yard run (Matthew Shipley Kick). 21-20 Arkansas
- (1:53) MIZ: Brady Cook 30 yard run (Brady Cook pass to Luther Burden III for two-point conversion). 28-21 Missouri

Statistics	ARK	MIZ
First downs	22	18
Total yards	377	361
Rushing yards	148	193
Passing yards	229	168
Passing: Comp–Att–Int	21–35–0	10–20–0
Time of possession	28:21	31:39

Team	Category	Player	Statistics
Arkansas	Passing	Taylen Green	21/35, 229 yards
Arkansas	Rushing	Ja'Quinden Jackson	18 carries, 87 yards, 3 TD
Arkansas	Receiving	Andrew Armstrong	9 receptions, 128 yards
Missouri	Passing	Brady Cook	10/20, 168 yards
Missouri	Rushing	Marcus Carroll	22 carries, 90 yards, 2 TD
Missouri	Receiving	Theo Wease Jr.	4 receptions, 100 yards

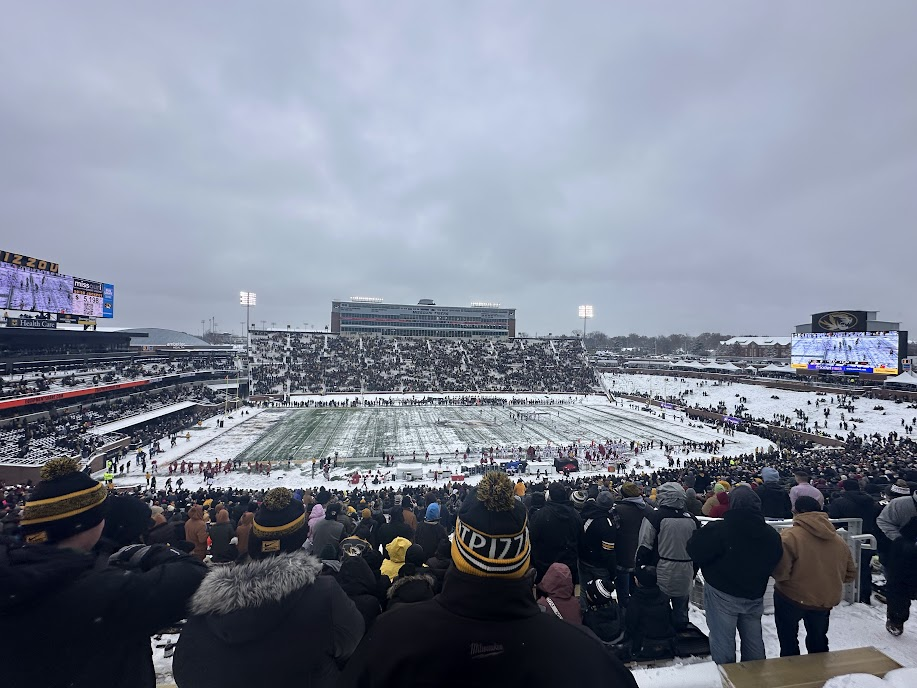
Missouri takes on Arkansas in the snow.

=== vs. Iowa (Music City Bowl) ===
Uniform Combination
Helmet (Oval Tiger)	Jersey	Pants

2024 Music City Bowl
Iowa Hawkeyes (8-4) vs No. 19 Missouri Tigers (9–3) – Game summary

Quarter	1	2	3	4	Total
Hawkeyes	14	7	3	0	24
No. 19 Tigers	7	7	7	6	27

at Nissan Stadium • Nashville, Tennessee

- Date: Monday, December 30, 2024
- Game time: 1:30 p.m. CST
- Game weather: Sunny • Temperature: 61 °F (16 °C) • Wind: 6 mph (9.7 km/h) Southeast
- Game attendance: 43,375
- Referee: Mike Roche (ACC)
- TV announcers (ESPN): Taylor Zarzour (play-by-play), Matt Stinchcomb (analyst), and Alyssa Lang (sideline) (ESPN)/Kevin Winter (play-by-play) and Orlando Franklin (analyst) (ESPN Radio)

Game information

First quarter

- (7:49) IOWA: Terrell Washington Jr. 6 yard pass from Brendan Sullivan (Drew Stevens Kick). 7-0 Iowa
- (2:12) MIZ: Theo Wease Jr. 8 yard pass from Brady Cook (Blake Craig Kick). Tied 7-7
- (1:59) IOWA: Kaden Wetjen 100 yard kickoff return (Drew Stevens Kick). 14-7 Iowa

Second quarter

- (13:28) MIZ: Marquis Johnson 7 yard pass from Brady Cook (Blake Craig Kick). Tied 14-14
- (0:49) IOWA: Kamari Moulton 1 yard run (Drew Stevens Kick). 21-14 Iowa

Third quarter

- (5:19) IOWA: Drew Stevens 38 yard field goal. 24-14 Iowa
- (1:49) MIZ: Joshua Manning 4 yard run (Blake Craig Kick). 24-21 Iowa

Fourth quarter

- (10:10) MIZ: Blake Craig 51 yard field goal. Tied 24-24
- (4:36) MIZ: Blake Craig 56 yard field goal. 27-24 Missouri

Statistics	IOWA	MIZZ
First downs	17	23
Total yards	297	376
Rushing yards	166	89
Passing yards	131	287
Passing: Comp–Att–Int	14-18-1	18-33-0
Time of possession	28:30	31:30

Team	Category	Player	Statistics
Iowa	Passing	Brendan Sullivan	14/18, 131 yards, 1 TD, 1 INT
Iowa	Rushing	Kamari Moulton	14 carries, 96 yards, 1 TD
Iowa	Receiving	Jarriett Buie	3 receptions, 30 yards
Missouri	Passing	Brady Cook	18/32, 287 yards, 2 TD
Missouri	Rushing	Brady Cook	14 carries, 54 yards
Missouri	Receiving	Marquis Johnson	7 receptions, 122 yards, 1 TD

== Coaching staff ==
Name	Position	Seasons at Missouri	Alma mater
Eliah Drinkwitz	Head Coach	5	Arkansas Tech (2004)
Al Pogue	Cornerbacks	3	Alabama State (1996)
Kirby Moore	Offensive coordinator/ Quarterbacks	2	Boise State (2013)
Corey Batoon	Defensive coordinator/safeties	1	Long Beach State (1991)
Erik Link	Special teams coordinator/tight ends	5	Drake (2003)
Al Davis	Defensive line (Interior)	4	Arkansas (2012)
Jacob Peeler	Wide receivers	3	Louisiana Tech (2007)
Brandon Jones	Offensive line	2	Texas Tech (2007)
Curtis Luper	Running backs	5	Stephen F. Austin (1996)
Brian Early	Defensive line (Edge)	1	University of Arkansas at Monticello (1994)
D. J. Smith	Co-defensive coordinator/linebackers/recruiting coordinator	5	Appalachian State (2010)
David Blackwell	Senior defensive analyst	2	East Carolina (1997)
Chris Ball	Defensive analyst	1	Missouri Western State (1987)

== Players drafted into the NFL ==
Round	Pick	Player	Position	NFL Club
1	7	Armand Membou	OT	New York Jets
2	39	Luther Burden III	WR	Chicago Bears
7	220	Marcus Bryant	OT	New England Patriots
