= 2024 Music City Bowl =

Postseason college football bowl game

2024 TransPerfect Music City Bowl
- 26th Music City Bowl
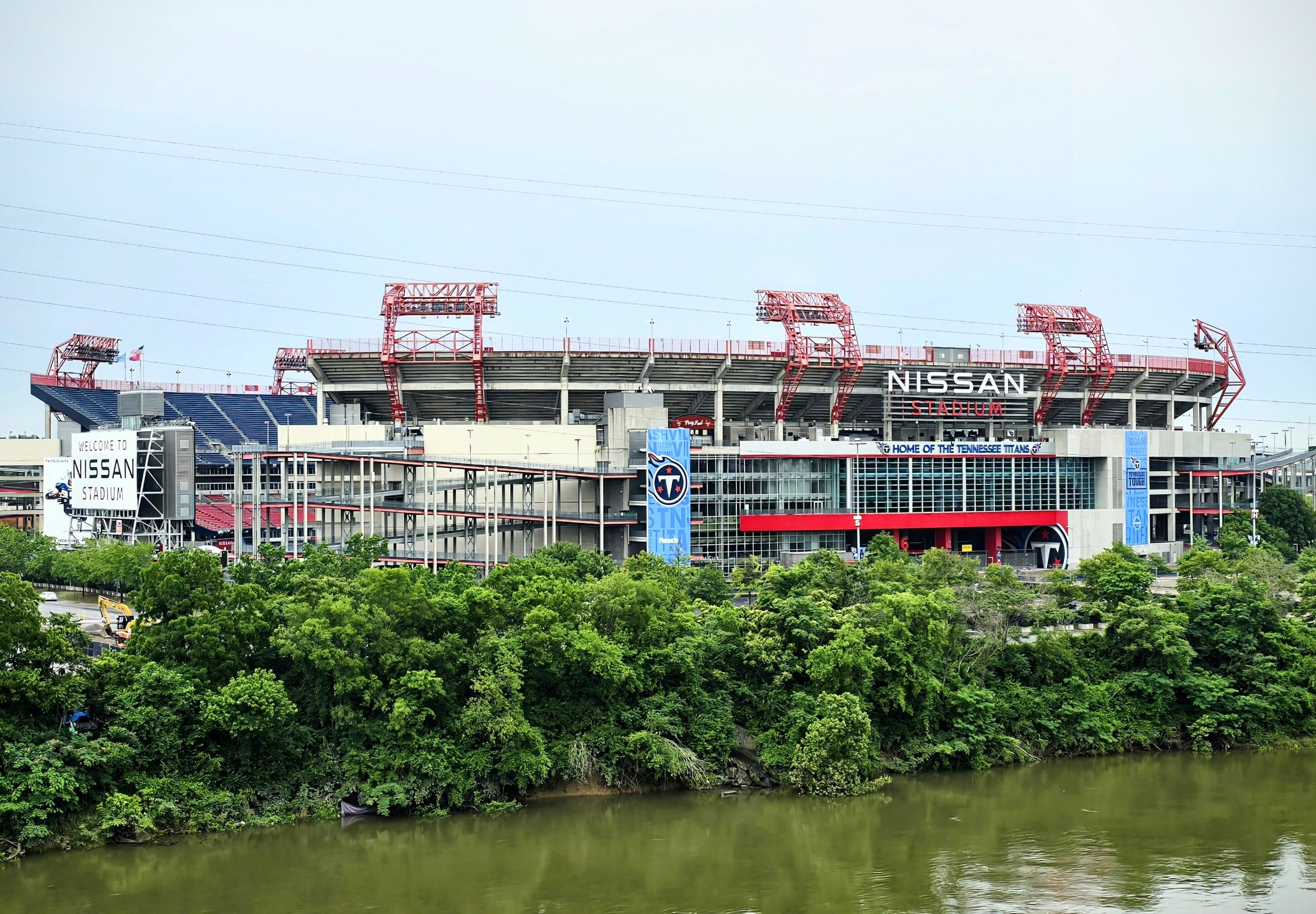
- Nissan Stadium in Nashville, Tennessee, hosted the Music City Bowl.
Iowa Hawkeyes	Missouri Tigers
(8–4)	(9–3)
Big Ten	SEC
24	27
Head coach: Kirk Ferentz	Head coach: Eliah Drinkwitz
	AP / Coaches / CFP; 23 / 20 / 19
	1	2	3	4	Total
Iowa	14	7	3	0	24
Missouri	7	7	7	6	27
- Date: December 30, 2024
- Season: 2024
- Stadium: Nissan Stadium
- Location: Nashville, Tennessee
- MVP: Brady Cook (QB, Missouri)
- Favorite: Missouri by 1.5
- Referee: Michael Roche (ACC)
- Attendance: 43,375

United States TV coverage
- Network: ESPN; ESPN Radio
- Announcers: Taylor Zarzour (play-by-play), Matt Stinchcomb (analyst), and Alyssa Lang (sideline) (ESPN); Kevin Winter (play-by-play) and Orlando Franklin (analyst) (ESPN Radio)

The 2024 Music City Bowl, officially known as the 2024 TransPerfect Music City Bowl, was a college football bowl game played on December 30, 2024, at Nissan Stadium in Nashville, Tennessee. The 26th annual Music City Bowl game featured the 9–3 Missouri Tigers going up against the 8–4 Iowa Hawkeyes. The game began at approximately 1:30 p.m. CST and aired on ESPN. The Music City Bowl was one of the 2024–25 bowl games that concluded the 2024 FBS football season. The title sponsor of the game was the TransPerfect translation and language services company.

== Teams ==
Consistent with conference tie-ins, the game featured teams from the Big Ten Conference and the Southeastern Conference (SEC).

This was the 14th meeting in the series between Iowa and Missouri—with 12 of the prior meetings held before 1911, and 5 before 1900—and the second time the teams faced off in a bowl game. The Hawkeyes defeated the Tigers in the 2010 Insight Bowl, 27–24. These two teams were selected to compete in the 2020 Music City Bowl but the game was cancelled due to complications regarding the COVID-19 pandemic.

=== Iowa Hawkeyes ===
The Hawkeyes entered the game with an 8–4 record (6–3 in the B1G), having finished tied for fifth place in the conference standings.

This was Iowa's second Music City Bowl. The Hawkeyes previously won the 2022 edition (21–0 vs. Kentucky).

=== Missouri Tigers ===
The Tigers entered the game with a 9–3 record (5–3 in the SEC), tied for fourth place in the conference standings, and landed at No. 19 in the final College Football Playoff (CFP) ranking.

This was Missouri's first Music City Bowl.

== Game summary ==
2024 TransPerfect Music City Bowl

Quarter	1	2	3	4	Total
Iowa	14	7	3	0	24
No. 19 Missouri	7	7	7	6	27

at Nissan Stadium • Nashville, Tennessee

- Date: Monday, December 30, 2024
- Game time: 2:34 p.m. EST
- Game weather: Sunny • Temperature: 61 °F (16 °C) • Wind: 6 mph (9.7 km/h) southeast
- Game attendance: 43,375
- Referee: Mike Roche
- TV announcers (ESPN): Taylor Zarzour (play-by-play), Matt Stinchcomb (analyst), and Alyssa Lang (sideline)
- Box score

Game information

First quarter

- (7:49) IOWA – Terrell Washington Jr. 6-yard pass from Brendan Sullivan, Drew Stevens kick (Drive: 8 plays, 70 yards, 4:32; Iowa 7–0)
- (2:12) MIZ – Theo Wease Jr. 8-yard pass from Brady Cook, Blake Craig kick (Drive: 10 plays, 85 yards, 5:33; Tied 7–7)
- (1:59) IOWA – Kaden Wetjen 100-yard kickoff return, Drew Stevens kick (Drive: 10 plays, 85 yards, 5:33; Iowa 14–7)

Second quarter

- (13:28) MIZ – Marquis Johnson 7-yard pass from Brady Cook, Blake Craig kick (Drive: 7 plays, 75 yards, 3:31; Tied 14–14)
- (0:49) IOWA – Kamari Moulton 1-yard run, Drew Stevens kick (Drive: 11 plays, 90 yards, 3:50; Iowa 21–14)

Third quarter

- (5:19) IOWA – Drew Stevens 38-yard field goal (Drive: 9 plays, 35 yards, 5:13; Iowa 24–14)
- (1:49) MIZ – Joshua Manning 4-yard run, Blake Craig kick (Drive: 7 plays, 75 yards, 3:30; Iowa 24–21)

Fourth quarter

- (10:10) MIZ – Blake Craig 51-yard field goal (Drive: 7 plays, 20 yards, 2:40; Tied 24–24)
- (4:36) MIZ – Blake Craig 56-yard field goal (Drive: 9 plays, 39 yards, 3:21; Missouri 27–24)

=== Statistics ===
Statistics	IOWA	MIZZ
First downs	17	23
Total yards	297	376
Rushing yards	166	89
Passing yards	131	287
Passing: Comp–Att–Int	14-18-1	18-33-0
Time of possession	28:30	31:30

Team	Category	Player	Statistics
Iowa	Passing	Brendan Sullivan	14/18, 131 yards, 1 TD, 1 INT
Iowa	Rushing	Kamari Moulton	14 carries, 96 yards, 1 TD
Iowa	Receiving	Jarriett Buie	3 receptions, 30 yards
Missouri	Passing	Brady Cook	18/32, 287 yards, 2 TD
Missouri	Rushing	Brady Cook	14 carries, 54 yards
Missouri	Receiving	Marquis Johnson	7 receptions, 122 yards, 1 TD
