= Armand Membou =

American football player (born 2004)

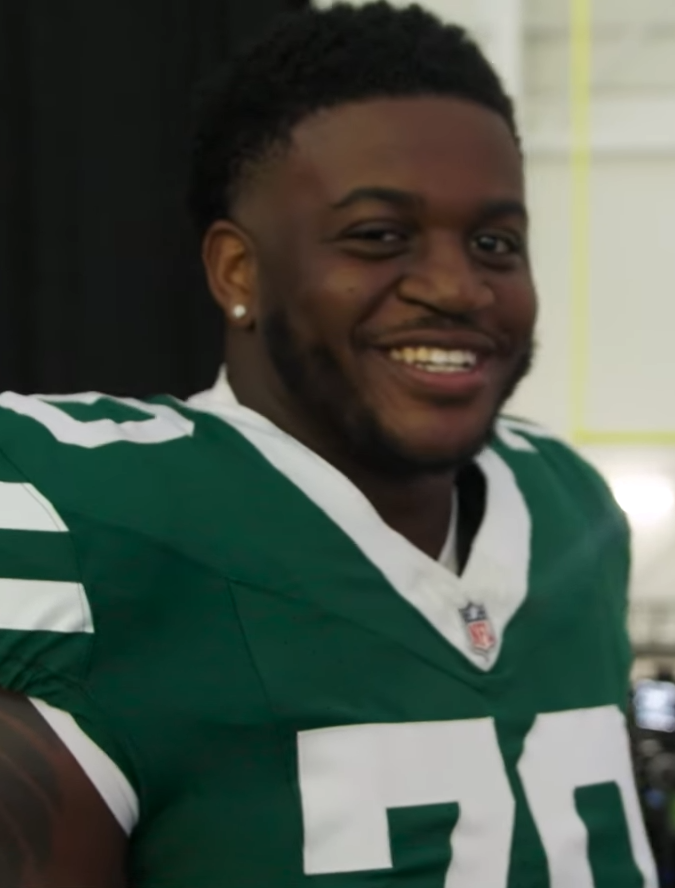
- Membou with the New York Jets in 2025

No. 70 – New York Jets
- Position: Offensive tackle
- Roster status: Active

Personal information
- Born: March 27, 2004 (age 22); Lee's Summit, Missouri, U.S.
- Listed height: 6 ft 4 in (1.93 m)
- Listed weight: 332 lb (151 kg)

Career information
- High school: Lee's Summit North
- College: Missouri (2022–2024)
- NFL draft: 2025: 1st round, 7th overall pick

Career history
- New York Jets (2025–present)

Awards and highlights
- PFWA All-Rookie Team (2025); Second-team All-SEC (2024)

Career NFL statistics as of Week 1, 2026
- Games played: 18
- Games started: 18
- Stats at Pro Football Reference

Armand Membou (MEM-boo; born March 27, 2004) is an American professional football offensive tackle for the New York Jets of the National Football League (NFL). He played college football for the Missouri Tigers and was selected by the Jets seventh overall in the 2025 NFL draft.

== Early life ==
Membou was born on March 27, 2004 in Lee's Summit, Missouri. He later attended Lee's Summit North High School. He was rated as a four-star recruit and committed to play college football for the Missouri Tigers over numerous Power 4 offers.

== College career ==
During Membou's first two seasons in 2022 and 2023, he appeared in 24 games with 18 starts for the Tigers at right tackle, where in 2023 he was a full-time starter on the Tigers line, which finished as a Joe Moore award semifinalist. Heading into the 2024 season, Membou was named to Bruce Feldman's freaks list. Membou declared for the 2025 NFL draft in December 2024.

== Professional career ==
Pre-draft measurables
| Height | Weight | Arm length | Hand span | Wingspan | 40-yard dash | 10-yard split | 20-yard split | Vertical jump | Broad jump | Bench press |
|---|---|---|---|---|---|---|---|---|---|---|
| 6 ft 4 1/4 in (1.94 m) | 332 lb (151 kg) | 33 1/2 in (0.85 m) | 9 3/4 in (0.25 m) | 6 ft 10 in (2.08 m) | 4.91 s | 1.74 s | 2.84 s | 34.0 in (0.86 m) | 9 ft 7 in (2.92 m) | 31 reps |
All values from NFL Combine

Membou was selected by the New York Jets in the first round with the seventh overall pick in the 2025 NFL draft. On May 8, Membou signed his four-year, $31,913,104 contract with the Jets.

Membou was named to the 2025 PFWA NFL All-Rookie Team as one of two offensive tackles, the other being Kelvin Banks Jr.

== Personal life ==
Membou's parents, Suffo Membou and Annie Melong, are both Cameroonian, and primarily spoke French. He is friends with his former high school and college teammate Cayden Green.
