= Cedar Ridge High School (Texas) =

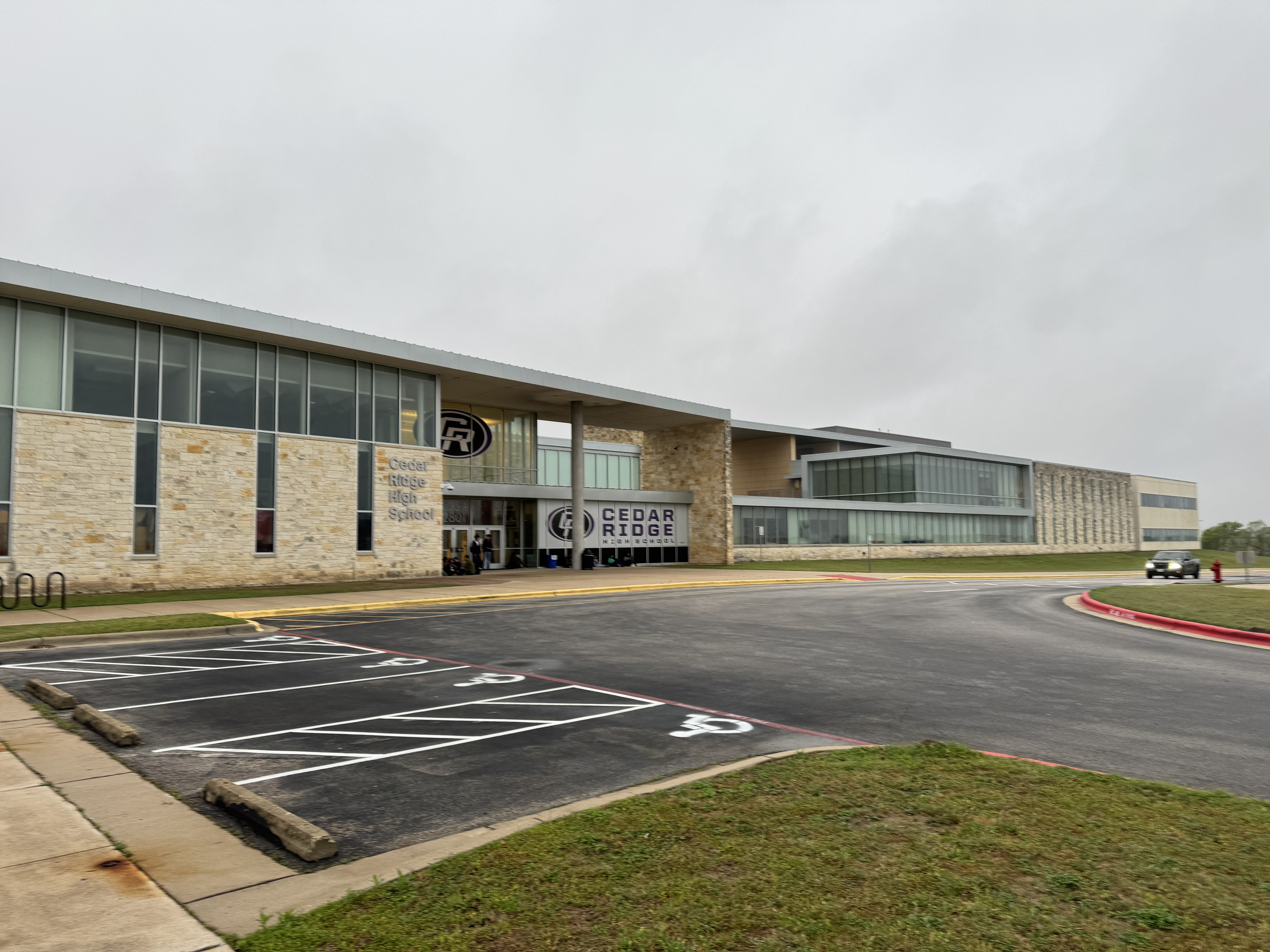
- Cedar Ridge High School in 2025

Location
- 2801 Gattis School Road; Round Rock, Texas 78664; United States
- 30°29′33″N 97°38′25″W

Information
- School type: Public high school
- Founded: 2010; 16 years ago
- Principal: Shawn Miller
- Teaching staff: 170.09 (FTE)
- Grades: 9–12
- Enrollment: 2,789 (2025–2026)
- Student to teacher ratio: 15.92
- Colors: Black, purple, and Silver
- Athletics conference: UIL Class 6A
- Nickname: Raiders
- Website: cedarridge.roundrockisd.org

Cedar Ridge High School is a public secondary school in Round Rock, Texas, United States. The school opened for the 2010-2011 school year with grades nine and ten. Grade eleven was added in 2011-2012, and grade twelve in 2012-2013. The school is the 3rd largest high school in the Round Rock Independent School District (RRISD) and the 8th largest Central Texas by enrollment, as of 2021. Admission is primarily based on the locations of students' homes in the district. The school's construction was approved with the passing of RRISD's 2006 Bond, and was completed prior to the beginning of the 2010-2011 school year.

The school houses the Professional Studies, the S.T.E.M.(Science, Technology, Engineering, and Mathematics), the International Business and Economics, the Visual/ Performing Arts, and the Health Science Academies.

== Demographics ==
The demographic breakdown of the 2,781 students enrolled in 2013-14 was:

- Male - 50.7%
- Female - 49.3%
- Native American/Alaskan - 0.6%
- Asian/Pacific islanders - 5.6%
- Black - 13.6%
- Hispanic - 35.2%
- White - 41.0%
- Multiracial - 4.0%

29.4% of the students were eligible for free or reduced lunch.

== Athletics ==
Cedar Ridge High School offers Varsity and Junior Varsity Football, Baseball, Basketball (Men and Women), Golf, Soccer (Men and Women), Tennis, Volleyball, Softball, Track, and Field (Men and Women), Cross Country, and Swimming. They also offer club sports such as Water Polo (hosted by the school's swimming team) and Ultimate Frisbee. The football, women's basketball, women's soccer, and softball teams have consistently advanced to the playoffs every year.

== Honors ==
Cedar Ridge High School was built with a modern and environmentally-friendly design. Upon completion, the school was named LEED-certified in 2011.

== Notable alumni ==
- Marcus Bryant (American football) – American football player (born 2002)
- Deuce Vaughn – American football player (born 2001)
- SypherPK (Ali Hassan) - Online content creator, streamer, and entrepreneur (born 1996)
