= Marcus Bryant (American football) =

American football player (born 2002)

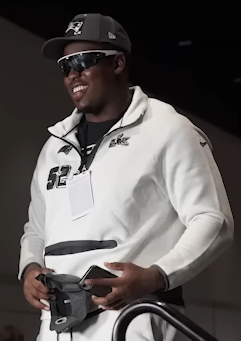
- Bryant in 2026

No. 52 – New England Patriots
- Position: Offensive tackle
- Roster status: Active

Personal information
- Born: June 22, 2002 (age 24); Round Rock, Texas, U.S.
- Listed height: 6 ft 7 in (2.01 m)
- Listed weight: 320 lb (145 kg)

Career information
- High school: Cedar Ridge (Round Rock, Texas)
- College: SMU (2020–2023); Missouri (2024)
- NFL draft: 2025: 7th round, 220th overall pick

Career history
- New England Patriots (2025–present)

Awards and highlights
- First-team All-AAC (2023)

Career NFL statistics as of Week 16, 2025
- Games played: 12
- Stats at Pro Football Reference

Marcus Bryant (born June 22, 2002) is an American professional football offensive tackle for the New England Patriots of the National Football League (NFL). He played college football for the SMU Mustangs and Missouri Tigers and was selected by the Patriots in the seventh round of the 2025 NFL draft.

== Early life ==
Bryant was born on June 22, 2002, in Round Rock, Texas. He attended Cedar Ridge High School in Round Rock where he played football as a tackle and was a unanimous first-team all-district selection. He earned first-team all-district honors in 2018 and 2019 and helped Cedar Ridge to three playoff appearances in three years. A three-star recruit and the 132nd-ranked offensive tackle according to 247Sports, he committed to play college football for the SMU Mustangs.

== College career ==
Bryant appeared in six games, one as a starter, for SMU as a true freshman in 2020. He then played in 10 games, six as a starter, in 2021, earning third-team All-American Athletic Conference (AAC) honors from Pro Football Focus. He earned PFF second-team All-AAC honors after the 2022 season, when he started 12 of 13 games. He allowed only one sack during the 2023 season and helped SMU to a win in the AAC Championship, earning first-team All-AAC honors and second-team All-Texas honors from Dave Campbell's Texas Football. He entered the NCAA transfer portal after the season, finishing his stint at SMU with 42 games played, 29 as a starter. Bryant transferred to the Missouri Tigers for his final season in 2024. He started all 13 games as Missouri's left tackle, allowing five sacks while helping the Tigers to 10 wins and a victory in the 2024 Music City Bowl.

== Professional career ==
Pre-draft measurables
Height	Weight
6 ft 6 5/8 in (2.00 m)	317 lb (144 kg)
Values from Pro Day

Bryant was selected by the New England Patriots in the seventh round (220th overall) of the 2025 NFL draft.
