= Nate Webb (baseball) =

American baseball player (born 1997)

Kansas City Monarchs – No. 6
- Pitcher
- Born: August 20, 1997 (age 29); Lee's Summit, Missouri, U.S.
- Bats: Right Throws: Right

Nathan Webb (born August 20, 1997) is an American professional baseball pitcher for the Kansas City Monarchs of the American Association of Professional Baseball.

== Career ==
Webb attended Lee's Summit North High School in Lee's Summit, Missouri.

=== Kansas City Royals ===
Webb was drafted by the Kansas City Royals in the 34th round, with the 1,033rd overall selection, of the 2016 Major League Baseball draft. He made his professional debut with the rookie–level Arizona League Royals, posting a 5.06 ERA in 12 games out of the bullpen. In 2017, Webb made 12 starts for the rookie–level Burlington Royals, accumulating a 3–5 record and 5.28 ERA with 44 strikeouts in 58 innings of work. He remained at the rookie–level for the following two seasons, playing for the Idaho Falls Chukars. He struggled to a 10.42 ERA in 11 games in 2018, but improved to a 4.55 ERA in 13 games (12 starts) in the 2019 season.

Webb did not play in a game in 2020 due to the cancellation of the minor league season because of the COVID-19 pandemic. He returned to action in 2021, splitting the season between the Single–A Columbia Fireflies and High–A Quad Cities River Bandits. In 35 total games, he registered a 4–3 record and 3.94 ERA with 89 strikeouts and 5 saves in 59 1/3 innings pitched.

On November 19, 2021, the Royals added Webb to their 40-man roster to protect him from the Rule 5 draft. Webb split the 2022 season between the rookie–level Arizona Complex League Royals, Double–A Northwest Arkansas Naturals, and Triple–A Omaha Storm Chasers. In 27 cumulative appearances, he struggled mightily to a 9.99 ERA with 39 strikeouts across 33 1/3 innings pitched. On November 15, 2022, Webb was designated for assignment by Kansas City. On November 18, he was non–tendered and became a free agent.

=== Pittsburgh Pirates ===
On November 22, 2022, Webb signed a minor league contract with the Pittsburgh Pirates. In March 2023, Webb underwent Tommy John surgery, ruling him out for the entire 2023 season. Webb was released by the Pirates organization on October 16, 2023.

=== Baltimore Orioles ===
On October 18, 2023, Webb signed a two–year, minor league contract with the Baltimore Orioles organization. On May 25, 2024, it was announced that Webb would miss the season after undergoing left Achilles tendon surgery, having suffered the injury while rehabbing from Tommy John.

Webb returned to action in 2025 with the Double-A Chesapeake Baysox and Triple-A Norfolk Tides, accumulating a 1-2 record and 4.70 ERA with 35 strikeouts and one save in 44 innings of work across 28 appearances. Webb was released by the Orioles organization on August 4, 2025.

=== Kansas City Monarchs ===
On March 6, 2026, Webb signed with the Kansas City Monarchs of the American Association of Professional Baseball. On April 1, Webb's contract was purchased by the Dorados de Chihuahua of the Mexican League. However he was released prior to the start of the season and returned to the Monarchs.
