= Lee's Summit North High School =

Location
- 901 NE Douglas St; Lee's Summit, Missouri 64086; United States; 38°55′45″N 94°22′40″W

Information
- Type: Public high school
- Established: 1995
- Status: Open
- School district: Lee's Summit R-VII School District
- NCES District ID: 2918300
- Principal: Dr. Tim Collins
- Teaching staff: 121.64 (on an FTE basis)
- Grades: 9–12
- Enrollment: 1,998 (2023-2024)
- Student to teacher ratio: 16.43
- Campus: Suburban
- Colors: Crimson, silver and black
- Mascot: Mr. Bronco
- Nickname: Broncos
- Website: lsnhs.lsr7.org
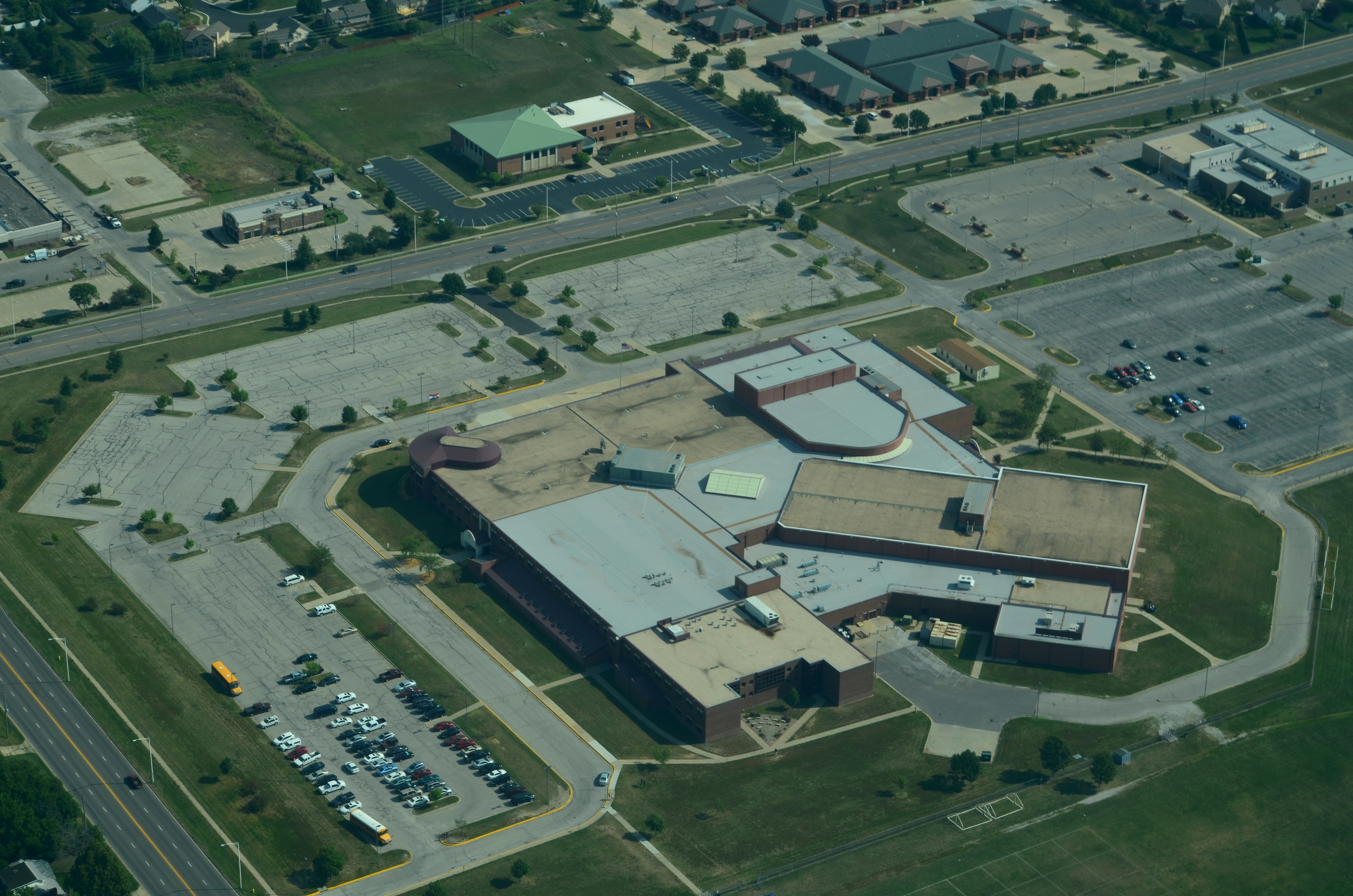

Lee's Summit North High School is a high school that serves grades 9–12. It is in Lee's Summit, Missouri, United States and is the second of three high schools opened there. The other two schools are Lee's Summit West High School and Lee's Summit High School. Lee's Summit North opened in the fall of 1995. Their mascot is the Bronco. The school offers classes for the IB Diploma. Bernard Campbell Middle School students attend Lee's Summit North.

== Academics ==
Lee's Summit North's A Debate team took third place in Public Forum debate at the Missouri State High School Activities Association (MSHSAA) 2006 Speech & Debate Championship. In 2007, the Lee's Summit Debate Team sent 6 students to nationals—one team in Policy Debate, one team in Public Forum Debate, one individual in congress and one individual in Lincoln-Douglas Debate. Ben Jewell is the debate coach. LSN Youth in Government is one of the largest delegations to attend the Clark State convention, in 2011 they had seven of the thirteen bills passed into YIG Law. Sponsored by Sarah Jones Courtney and Rhonda Ireland.

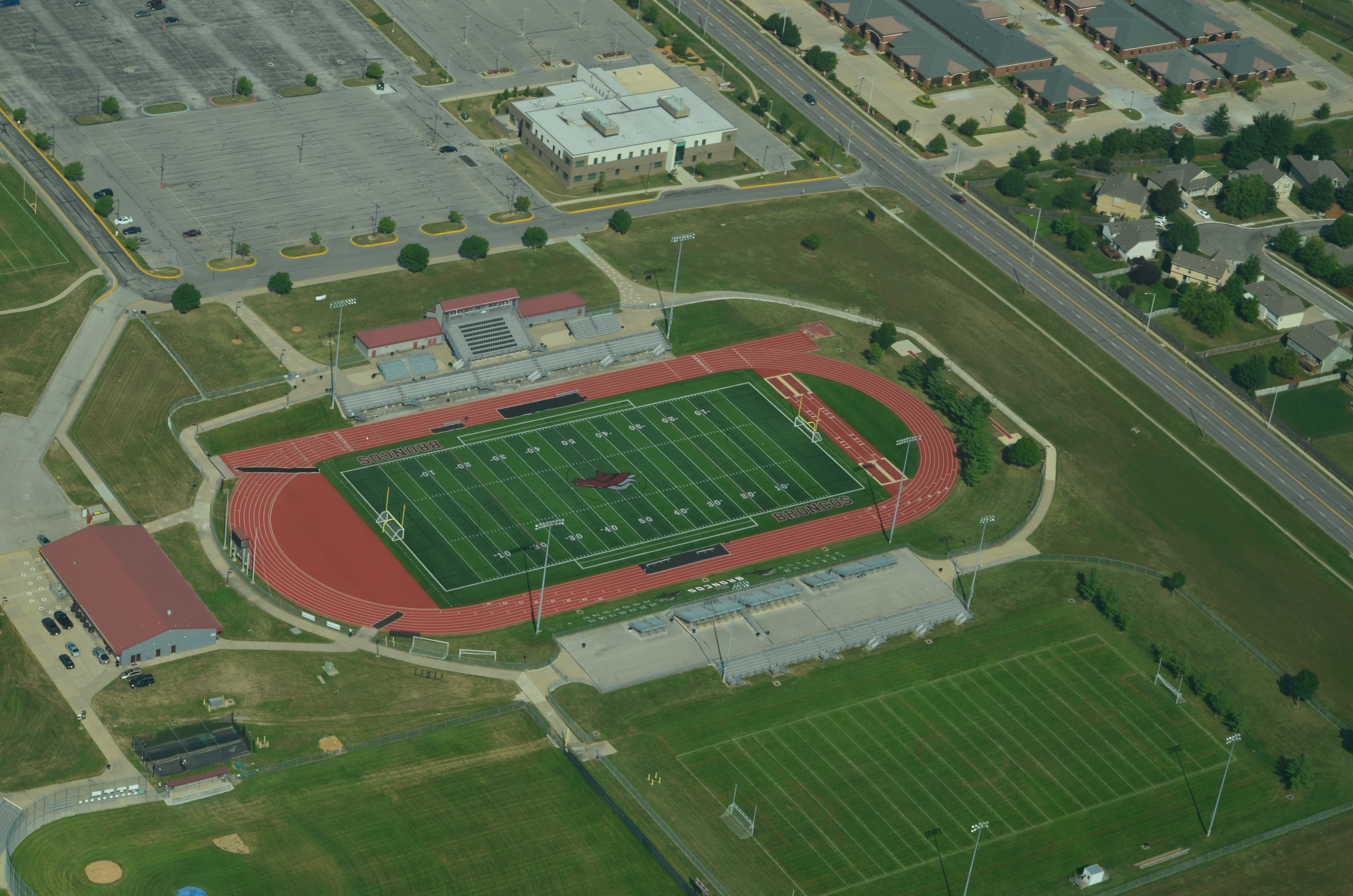
North High School Stadium

== Athletics ==
The Lee's Summit North Boys Track & Field Team won the state championship in 2005 and 2007. They also took 2nd place in 2004 and 3rd place in 2006. The Boys Cross Country Team won the state championship in 2010 and took 2nd place in 2009. Also, the Lee's Summit North Baseball team placed second in the Class 4 Missouri State Baseball Championships in 2009.

The girls soccer team won state in 2000 and took second in both 2002 and 2009.

The Varsity cheerleading squad won the 5A Class state championships in 2004 and 2005, which took place at the University of Missouri in Columbia, Missouri in November of each year. In 2006, the squad placed fourth. Also the varsity cheerleading squad is a 4- time State championship starting from 2014-2018

The Varsity girls tennis team won state in 2013 and placed third in 2012.

NFL wide receiver Tyreek Hill began coaching as an assistant for the school's football team in 2020.

== Theatre ==
Lee's Summit North theater has received 2 Outstanding Overall Production awards from Bluestar, a local theatre awards program.

== Notable alumni ==
- Tommy Frevert, American football player
- Cayden Green, college football offensive tackle for the Missouri Tigers
- Dennis Hopeless, American comics writer
- Armand Membou, NFL offensive tackle for the New York Jets
- Jordan Murray, NFL tight end for the Chicago Bears
- Williams Nwaneri, college football defensive end for the Nebraska Cornhuskers
- Nathan Webb, MLB pitcher for the Baltimore Orioles
