= Nicholas Rodriguez =

American football player (born 2005)

No. 5 – Missouri Tigers
- Position: Linebacker
- Class: Junior

Personal information
- Born: August 28, 2005 (age 21)
- Listed height: 6 ft 0 in (1.83 m)
- Listed weight: 225 lb (102 kg)

Career information
- High school: St. Thomas Aquinas (Fort Lauderdale, Florida)
- College: Missouri (2024–present)
- Stats at ESPN

Nicholas Rodriguez (born August 28, 2005) is an American college football linebacker for the Missouri Tigers.

== Early life ==
Rodriguez attended St. Thomas Aquinas High School in Fort Lauderdale, Florida. As a senior, he totaled 114 tackles, 15 tackles for loss, and nine sacks. Rodriguez committed to the University of Missouri to play college football.

== College career ==
After playing a reserve role as a freshman, Rodriguez recorded 61 tackles and led the team with seven pass deflections. He entered the 2026 season as the Tigers' returning leading tackler and a team captain.
