= Cayden Green =

American football player (born 2004)

No. 70 – Missouri Tigers
- Position: Offensive tackle
- Class: Senior

Personal information
- Born: November 15, 2004 (age 21)
- Listed height: 6 ft 5 in (1.96 m)
- Listed weight: 324 lb (147 kg)

Career information
- High school: Lee's Summit North (Lee's Summit, Missouri)
- College: Oklahoma (2023); Missouri (2024–present)

Awards and highlights
- First-team All-SEC (2025)
- Stats at ESPN

Cayden Green (born November 15, 2004) is an American college football offensive tackle for the Missouri Tigers. He previously played for the Oklahoma Sooners.

== Early life ==
Green attended Lee's Summit North High School in Lee's Summit, Missouri. He was rated as a four-star recruit and committed to play college football for the Oklahoma Sooners.

== College career ==
=== Oklahoma ===
As a freshman in 2023, Green appeared in 12 games for the Sooners, making five starts. After the season, he entered his name into the NCAA transfer portal.

=== Missouri ===
Green transferred to play for the Missouri Tigers. He started at left guard throughout the 2024 season and switched to left tackle for the 2025 season.
