= Marquis Johnson (wide receiver) =

American football player (born 2004)

No. 2 – Mississippi State Bulldogs
- Position: Wide receiver
- Class: Senior

Personal information
- Born: September 15, 2004 (age 22)
- Listed height: 5 ft 11 in (1.80 m)
- Listed weight: 190 lb (86 kg)

Career information
- High school: Dickinson (Dickinson, Texas)
- College: Missouri (2023–2025); Mississippi State (2026–present)
- Stats at ESPN

Marquis Johnson (born September 15, 2004) is an American college football wide receiver for the Mississippi State Bulldogs. He previously played for the Missouri Tigers.

== Early life ==
Johnson attended Dickinson High School in Dickinson, Texas. Over his junior and senior season, he combined to catch 49 passes for 960 yards with 11 touchdowns and rushed for 519 yards with six touchdowns. He committed to the University of Missouri to play college football.

== College career ==
As a true freshman at Missouri in 2023, Johnson played in all 13 games and had 13 receptions for 383 yards and three touchdowns. As a sophomore in 2024, he played in 12 games, recording 25 receptions for 352 yards and one touchdown. As a junior in 2025, Johnson took over as the team's number one receiver.

== Personal life ==
Johnson's father is former NFL cornerback, D. J. Johnson.

Johnson's mother died in April 2025.
