= Theo Wease Jr. =

American football player (born 2001)

No. 82 – Los Angeles Chargers
- Position: Wide receiver
- Roster status: Active

Personal information
- Born: June 25, 2001 (age 25); Fresno, California, U.S.
- Listed height: 6 ft 2 in (1.88 m)
- Listed weight: 208 lb (94 kg)

Career information
- High school: Allen (TX)
- College: Oklahoma (2019–2022); Missouri (2023–2024)
- NFL draft: 2025: undrafted

Career history
- Miami Dolphins (2025); Los Angeles Chargers (2026–present)

Career NFL statistics as of Week 8, 2026
- Receptions: 9
- Receiving yards: 176
- Receiving touchdowns: 1
- Stats at Pro Football Reference

Theo Wease Jr. (born June 25, 2001) is an American professional football wide receiver for the Los Angeles Chargers of the National Football League (NFL). He played college football for the Oklahoma Sooners and Missouri Tigers.

== Early life ==
Wease Jr. attended Allen High School in Allen, Texas. He was selected to play in the 2019 Under Armour All-America Game and 2019 All-American Bowl. A five-star recruit, he committed to the University of Oklahoma to play college football.

== College career ==
As a true freshman at Oklahoma in 2019, Wease Jr. played in 13 games and had eight receptions for 136 yards and two touchdowns. He started all 11 games in 2020 and led the team with 37 receptions for 530 yards and four touchdowns. He played in only one game in 2021 due to a foot injury he suffered in the first game of the season. Wease Jr returned from the injury in 2022 and had 19 receptions for 378 yards and four touchdowns. After the season, he entered the transfer portal and transferred to the University of Missouri.

== Professional career ==
Pre-draft measurables
Height	Weight	Arm length	Hand span	Wingspan	40-yard dash	10-yard split	20-yard split	20-yard shuttle	Three-cone drill	Vertical jump	Broad jump
6 ft 3 in (1.91 m)	200 lb (91 kg)	32 1/8 in (0.82 m)	9 5/8 in (0.24 m)	6 ft 6 3/8 in (1.99 m)	4.56 s	1.56 s	2.69 s	4.30 s	7.15 s	31.0 in (0.79 m)	9 ft 9 in (2.97 m)
All values from NFL Combine/Pro Day

=== Miami Dolphins ===
On May 9, 2025, Wease signed with the Miami Dolphins as an undrafted free agent after going unselected in the 2025 NFL draft. On August 26, he was waived by the Dolphins as part of final roster cuts and re-signed to the practice squad the following day. Wease was promoted to the active roster on December 27. In Week 17 against the Tampa Bay Buccaneers, Wease scored his first career touchdown on a 63-yard reception from Quinn Ewers.

On August 29, 2026, Wease was waived by the Dolphins.

=== Los Angeles Chargers ===
On September 2, 2026, Wease signed with the Los Angeles Chargers' practice squad. On October 10, he was signed to the active roster.
